= 2024–25 Karlsruher SC season =

Karlsruher SC
2024–25 season
- Head coach: Christian Eichner
- Stadium: Wildparkstadion
- 2. Bundesliga: 8th
- DFB-Pokal: Round of 16
- Top goalscorer: League: Marvin Wanitzek (13); All: Marvin Wanitzek (15)
- Biggest win: Sportfreunde Lotte 0–5 Karlsruher SC
Home colours	Away colours	Third colours

The 2024–25 season was the 130th season in the history of Karlsruher SC, and the club's sixth consecutive season in the 2. Bundesliga. In addition to the domestic league, the club participated in the DFB-Pokal.

== Transfers ==
=== In ===
Pos.	Player	Transferred from	Fee	Date	Source
FW	(Germany) Stefano Marino	(Germany) Astoria Walldorf	Loan return	30 June 2024	
MF	(Switzerland) Noah Rupp	(Switzerland) FC Luzern	Free	1 July 2024	
DF	(Germany) Benedikt Bauer	(Germany) SpVgg Unterhaching	Free	1 July 2024	
DF	(Germany) David Herold	(Germany) Bayern Munich	Undisclosed	1 July 2024	
MF	(Germany) Robin Heußer	(Germany) Wehen Wiesbaden	Free	1 July 2024	
FW	(Switzerland) Andrin Hunziker	(Switzerland) FC Basel	Loan	1 July 2024	
MF	(Germany) Bambasé Conté	(Germany) TSG Hoffenheim	Loan	3 July 2024	

=== Out ===
Pos.	Player	Transferred to	Fee	Date	Source
MF	(Germany) Paul Nebel	(Germany) Mainz 05	Loan return	30 June 2024	
FW	(Croatia) Igor Matanović	(Germany) Eintracht Frankfurt	Loan return	30 June 2024	
MF	(Germany) Lars Stindl		Retired	1 July 2024	
DF	(Finland) Daniel O'Shaughnessy	(Finland) HJK Helsinki	End of contract	1 July 2024	
DF	(Germany) Daniel Brosinski	(Germany) FV Fortuna Kirchfeld	End of contract	1 July 2024	
DF	(Germany) Philip Heise	(Germany) Dynamo Dresden	End of contract	1 July 2024	
MF	(Germany) Jérôme Gondorf		Retired	1 July 2024	
MF	(Germany) Tim Rossmann	(Germany) Fortuna Düsseldorf	End of contract	1 July 2024	
GK	(Germany) Kai Eisele		End of contract	1 July 2024	
DF	(Germany) Marco Thiede		End of contract	1 July 2024	
GK	(Germany) Patrick Drewes	(Germany) VfL Bochum	Undisclosed	1 July 2024	
FW	(Georgia (country)) Budu Zivzivadze	(Germany) 1. FC Heidenheim	Undisclosed	3 January 2025	

== Friendlies ==
=== Pre-season ===
29 June 2024 Friendly	FSV Kappelrodeck-Waldulm (Germany)	0–24	(Germany) Karlsruher SC	Kappelrodeck
13:00		Report	Burnić 8'; Ludwig 10' (o.g.); Geller 12', 20', 36', 40'; Stefano Marino 15', 42'; Jensen 24', 26'; Pedrosa 48'; Schleusener 50', 57', 60', 70', 72', 84'; Ben Farhat 54', 80'; Rupp 61', 64'; Wanitzek 78', 79'; Franke 87'	Stadium: Rodeck-Stadion; Attendance: 2,000

3 July 2024 Friendly	SV Schluchtern (Germany)	0–16	(Germany) Karlsruher SC	Schluchtern
		Report		Stadium: GESSMANN-Sportpark

5 July 2024 Friendly	Viktoria Plzeň (Czech Republic)	2–0	(Germany) Karlsruher SC	Kufstein, Austria
13:30	Vašulín 6'; Bello 81'			Stadium: Kufstein-Arena

9 July 2024 Friendly	Karlsruher SC (Germany)	0–3	(Poland) Górnik Zabrze	Neukirchen am Großvenediger, Austria
16:00			Krawczyk 36'; Zahović 48' (pen.); Buksa 79'	Stadium: Sportplatz Neukirchen

13 July 2024 Friendly	HNK Rijeka (Croatia)	0–1	(Germany) Karlsruher SC	Bruck an der Großglocknerstraße, Austria
17:00		Report	Schleusener 98'	Stadium: Schloßbadarena
Note: Two periods of 60 minutes

20 July 2024 Friendly	Karlsruher SC (Germany)	4–1	(Germany) TSG Hoffenheim	Karlsruhe
16:00	Wanitzek 17'; Zivzivadze 21', 42'; Schleusener 87'	Report	Tohumcu 38'	Stadium: Arthur Beier-Stadion; Referee: Roy Dingler

24 July 2024 Friendly	Karlsruher SC (Germany)	2–0	(Germany) 1860 Munich	Karlsruhe
14:00	Heußer 25'; Geller 35'; Burnić (yellow card) 80'	Report		Stadium: Arthur Beier-Stadion; Attendance: 963; Referee: Marc Heiker

27 July 2024 Friendly	Karlsruher SC (Germany)	4–1	(France) RC Strasbourg	Karlsruhe
15:30	Rapp 17'; Schleusener 27'; Zivzivadze 40'; Wanitzek 56'	Report	Sylla 48'	Stadium: Wildparkstadion; Attendance: 10,525; Referee: Lars Erbst

=== Mid-season ===
7 January 2025 Friendly	St. Gallen (Switzerland)	2–1	(Germany) Karlsruher SC
15:00

10 January 2025 Friendly	Karlsruher SC (Germany)	1–3	(Switzerland) Servette FC
14:30

20 March 2025 Friendly	SC Freiburg (Germany)	1–2	(Germany) Karlsruher SC
13:00

== Competitions ==
=== Overall record ===
Competition	First match	Last match	Starting round	Final position	Record							
Competition	First match	Last match	Starting round	Final position	Pld	W	D	L	GF	GA	GD	Win %
2. Bundesliga	3 August 2024	18 May 2025	Matchday 1	8th	34	14	10	10	57	55	+2	41.18
DFB-Pokal	18 August 2024	4 December 2024	First round	Round of 16	3	2	1	0	9	2	+7	66.67
Total					37	16	11	10	66	57	+9	43.24

Last updated: 4 May 2025
Source: Soccerway

=== 2. Bundesliga ===
==== League table ====
Pos	Team	Pld	W	D	L	GF	GA	GD	Pts
6	Fortuna Düsseldorf	34	14	11	9	57	52	+5	53
7	1. FC Kaiserslautern	34	15	8	11	56	55	+1	53
8	Karlsruher SC	34	14	10	10	57	55	+2	52
9	Hannover 96	34	13	12	9	41	36	+5	51
10	1. FC Nürnberg	34	14	6	14	60	57	+3	48

Source: Bundesliga
Rules for classification: 1) Points; 2) Goal difference; 3) Goals scored; 4) Head-to-head results; 5) Head-to-head away goals scored; 6) Away goals scored; 7) Play-off.
(Rules 4–6 only apply after home and away matches have been played between the tied teams.)

==== Results summary ====
Overall								Home						Away					
Pld	W	D	L	GF	GA	GD	Pts	W	D	L	GF	GA	GD	W	D	L	GF	GA	GD
34	14	10	10	57	55	+2	52	9	4	4	31	24	+7	5	6	6	26	31	−5

Last updated: 8 November 2025.

==== Results by round ====
Round	1	2	3	4	5	6	7	8	9	10	11	12	13	14	15	16	17	18	19	20	21	22	23	24	25	26	27	28	29	30	31	32	33	34
Ground	H	A	H	A	H	A	A	H	A	H	A	H	A	H	A	H	A	A	H	A	H	A	H	H	A	H	A	H	A	H	A	H	A	H
Result	W	D	W	W	W	D	D	D	W	L	L	D	W	L	L	W	W	L	L	D	L	L	W	W	L	D	L	W	D	W	W	D	D	W
Position	2	3	2	1	1	2	3	3	4	6	7	8	6	9	11	8	7	9	10	9	10	12	11	9	10	11	10	9	8	8	8	8	8	8

Updated to match(es) played on 18 May 2025. Source: Bundesliga.com • Kicker • FotMob
A = Away; H = Home; W = Win; D = Draw; L = Loss

==== Matches ====
The match schedule was released on 4 July 2024.

3 August 2024 1	Karlsruher SC	3–2	1. FC Nürnberg	Karlsruhe
13:00 CEST (UTC+2)	Jensen (yellow card) 9'; Zivzivadze 45+2', 73', 79'; Burnić (yellow card) 52'	Report	Okunuki 20'; Pick 31'; Jeltsch (yellow card) 45+4'; Castrop (yellow card) 66'; Flick (yellow card) 78'; Serra (yellow card) 87'	Stadium: BBBank Wildpark; Attendance: 30,707; Referee: Robin Braun

10 August 2024 2	Fortuna Düsseldorf	0–0	Karlsruher SC	Düsseldorf
13:00 CEST (UTC+2)	Hoffmann (yellow card) 67'; Klaus (yellow card) 76'; Thioune (yellow card) 77'	Report	Rapp (yellow card) 39'	Stadium: Merkur Spiel-Arena; Attendance: 36,103; Referee: Robert Hartmann

23 August 2024 3	Karlsruher SC	3–2	SV Elversberg	Karlsruhe
18:30 CEST (UTC+2)	Günther 18'; Schleusener 48'; Rapp (yellow card) 49'; Hunziker 75' (yellow card) 86'	Report	Schnellbacher 30'; Asllani 60'	Stadium: BBBank Wildpark; Attendance: 26,838; Referee: Felix Prigan

1 September 2024 4	Eintracht Braunschweig	1–2	Karlsruher SC	Braunschweig
13:30 CEST (UTC+2)	Bičakčić 14'; Köhler (yellow card) 90+5'; Ould Chikh (yellow card) 90+5'	Report	Rapp (yellow card) 39'; Hunziker 73'; Zivzivadze 87'	Stadium: Eintracht-Stadion; Attendance: 19,908; Referee: Tom Bauer

13 September 2024 5	Karlsruher SC	2–0	Schalke 04	Karlsruhe
18:30 CEST (UTC+2)	Schleusener (yellow card) 3'; Zivzivadze (yellow card) 35' (goal) 45+3', 73'; Rapp (yellow card) 45+2'; Wanitzek (yellow card) 71'	Report	Mohr (yellow card) 43'	Stadium: BBBank Wildpark; Attendance: 31,845; Referee: Tobias Welz

22 September 2024 6	1. FC Magdeburg	2–2	Karlsruher SC	Magdeburg
13:30 CEST (UTC+2)	Amaechi 5'; Mathisen (yellow card) 62'; Heber (yellow card) 63'; Hercher 78'; Kaars (yellow card) 90+5'	Report	Beifus (yellow card) 7'; Jensen 24'; Wanitzek 30'; Burnić (yellow card) 55'; Zivzivadze (yellow card) 75'	Stadium: MDCC-Arena; Attendance: 26,043; Referee: Patrick Alt

29 September 2024 7	1. FC Köln	4–4	Karlsruher SC	Cologne
13:30 CEST (UTC+2)	Waldschmidt 3'; Downs 7', 15'; Lemperle 45+2'	Report	Burnić (yellow card) 6'; Wanitzek 19', 27', 55' (yellow card) 45+2'; Eichner (yellow card) 45+4'; Jensen 52'; Günther (yellow card) 61'	Stadium: RheinEnergieStadion; Attendance: 50,000; Referee: Benjamin Brand

4 October 2024 8	Karlsruher SC	3–3	SV Darmstadt 98	Karlsruhe
18:30 CEST (UTC+2)	Burnić (yellow card) 6' (goal) 11'; Jensen 28' (yellow card) 71'; Kobald (yellow card) 69'; Schleusener 77'; Hunziker (yellow card) 82'	Report	Lidberg 15'; Kohfeldt (yellow card) 45+2'; Klefisch 54'; Vukotić 74'; Riedel (yellow card) 88'	Stadium: BBBank Wildpark; Attendance: 31,034; Referee: Florian Lechner

20 October 2024 9	SSV Ulm 1846	0–1	Karlsruher SC	Ulm
13:30 CEST (UTC+2)	Higl (yellow card) 88'; Strompf (yellow card) 90+1'; Maier (yellow card) 90+5'	Report	Rapp (yellow card) 28'; Zivzivadze (yellow card) 83'; Franke (yellow card) 90+1' (goal) 90+4'	Stadium: Donaustadion; Attendance: 17,400; Referee: Michael Bacher

26 October 2024 10	Karlsruher SC	1–3	Hertha BSC	Karlsruhe
13:00CEST (UTC+2)	Jensen (yellow card) 37'; Zivzivadze 45+3'; Schleusener (yellow card) 60'; Jung (yellow card) 72'; Beifus (yellow card) 76'; Heußer (yellow card) 80'; Hunziker (yellow card) 83'	Report	Leistner (yellow card) 5'; Maza 9'; Zeefuik 49'; Niederlechner 58'; Scherhant (yellow card) 72'; Dárdai (yellow card) 72'; Schuler (yellow card) 77'	Stadium: BBBank Wildpark; Attendance: 31,845; Referee: Florian Heft

2 November 2024 11	Hannover 96	2–1	Karlsruher SC	Hanover
13:00 CET (UTC+1)	Leopold (yellow card) 14'; Halstenberg (yellow card) 45+2' (goal) 89' (pen.); Ngankam 66'; Momuluh (yellow card) 90+3'	Report	Jensen (yellow card) 38'; Franke 45'; Rapp (yellow card) 51'	Stadium: Heinz von Heiden-Arena; Attendance: 39,500; Referee: Richard Hempel

10 November 2024 12	Karlsruher SC	1–1	Preußen Münster	Karlsruhe
13:30 CET (UTC+1)	Franke (yellow card) 21'; Zivzivadze 37'	Report	ter Horst (yellow card) 60'; Frenkert (yellow card) 74' (goal) 90+2'; Koulis (yellow card) 88'	Stadium: BBBank Wildpark; Attendance: 30,083; Referee: Robert Kampka

23 November 2024 13	Greuther Fürth	2–3	Karlsruher SC	Fürth
13:00 CET (UTC+1)	Hrgota 20'; Srbeny (yellow card) 43'; Bansé 83'; Michalski (yellow card) 90+1'	Report	Zivzivadze 46'; Conté 73'; Schleusener 79' (yellow card) 85'; Jensen (yellow card) 82'	Stadium: Sportpark Ronhof Thomas Sommer; Attendance: 12,143; Referee: Lukas Benen

1 December 2024 14	Karlsruher SC	1–3	Hamburger SV	Karlsruhe
13:30 CET (UTC+1)	Schleusener 36'; Burnić (yellow card) 55'; Rapp (yellow card) 61'; Zivzivadze (yellow card) 69'; Franke (yellow card) 90+2'	Report	Dompé 23', 55' (yellow card) 85'; Königsdörffer (yellow card) 60'; Elfadli (yellow card) 72'; Selke 87' (yellow card) 90+2'	Stadium: BBBank Wildpark; Attendance: 31,845; Referee: Sascha Stegemann

7 December 2024 15	1. FC Kaiserslautern	3–1	Karlsruher SC	Kaiserslautern
13:00 CET (UTC+1)	Tomiak 13' (pen.) (yellow card) 87'; Elvedi (yellow card) 40'; Yokota (yellow card) 45+3'; Anfang (yellow card) 45+4'; Ronstadt (yellow card) 56'; Redondo 73'; Heuer 75'; Kleinhansl (yellow card) 82'	Report	Franke (yellow card) 45+3'; Wanitzek 88'	Stadium: Fritz-Walter-Stadion; Attendance: 48,567; Referee: Robert Hartmann

13 December 2024 16	Karlsruher SC	4–2	Jahn Regensburg	Karlsruhe
18:30 CET (UTC+1)	Jensen (yellow card) 3'; Zivzivadze 45+2', 62'; Wanitzek 56' (pen.); Schleusener (yellow card) 68' (goal) 86'; Pfeiffer (yellow card) 74'; Burnić (yellow card) 80'	Report	Kühlwetter 19' (pen.); Hottmann 49'; Bulić (yellow card) 55'; Geipl (yellow card) 59'	Stadium: BBBank Wildpark; Attendance: 24,158; Referee: Felix Prigan

21 December 2024 17	SC Paderborn	1–2	Karlsruher SC	Paderborn
13:00 CET (UTC+1)	Obermair 45' (pen.); Kwasniok (yellow card) 90+1'; Scheller (yellow card) 90+5'; Sanchez (yellow card) 90+5'	Report	Jung 16'; Rapp (yellow card) 24'; Zivzivadze 34'; Burnić (yellow card) 45+2'; Conté (yellow card) 82'	Stadium: Home Deluxe Arena; Attendance: 14,362; Referee: Max Burda

19 January 2025 18	1. FC Nürnberg	2–1	Karlsruher SC	Nuremberg
13:30 CET (UTC+1)	Tzimas 37' (yellow card) 90+5'; Emreli (yellow card) 45+2'; Flick 90+1'; Soares (yellow card) 90+4'	Report	Schleusener 40'; Burnić (yellow card) 68'; Heußer (yellow card) 70'; Rapp (yellow card) 90+5'	Stadium: Max-Morlock-Stadion; Attendance: 31,507; Referee: Sören Storks

25 January 2025 19	Karlsruher SC	2–3	Fortuna Düsseldorf	Karlsruhe
13:00 CET (UTC+1)	Kaufmann 9'; Burnić (yellow card) 20'; Heußer 22'; Wanitzek (yellow card) 26'; Weiß (yellow card) 80'	Report	Pejčinović 47'; Friðriksson (yellow card) 48'; Haag (yellow card) 57'; Kownacki 81' (pen.), 90+3' (yellow card) 90+3'; van Brederode (yellow card) 90+3'	Stadium: BBBank Wildpark; Attendance: 30,374; Referee: Wolfgang Haslberger

31 January 2025 20	SV Elversberg	2–2	Karlsruher SC	Spiesen-Elversberg
18:30 CET (UTC+1)	Petkov 44'; Sickinger 50' (pen.); Rohr (yellow card) 62'	Report	Wanitzek 75', 85'	Stadium: Ursapharm-Arena an der Kaiserlinde; Attendance: 10,102; Referee: Florian Heft

9 February 2025 21	Karlsruher SC	0–2	Eintracht Braunschweig	Karlsruhe
13:30 CET (UTC+1)	Weiß (yellow card) 8'	Report	Dräger (yellow card) 30'; Szabó 36' (pen.); Di Michele Sanchez (yellow card) 48'; Tempelmann 75'; Bičakčić (yellow card) 87'	Stadium: BBBank Wildpark; Attendance: 27,152; Referee: Eric-Dominic Weisbach

16 February 2025 22	Schalke 04	2–1	Karlsruher SC	Gelsenkirchen
13:30 CET (UTC+1)	Bachmann 6'; Ba 34'; Gantenbein (yellow card) 87'	Report	Jensen 26'; Burnić (yellow card) 78'	Stadium: Veltins-Arena; Attendance: 61,804; Referee: Robin Braun

22 February 2025 23	Karlsruher SC	3–1	1. FC Magdeburg	Karlsruhe
13:00 CET (UTC+1)	Heußer (yellow card) 36'; Rapp 45+3'; Kobald 48'; Wanitzek 69'	Report	Atik 30' (yellow card) 71' (yellow-red card) 90+5'; Mathisen (yellow card) 88'; Teixeira (yellow card) 90+4'	Stadium: BBBank Wildpark; Attendance: 26,148; Referee: Sven Jablonski

1 March 2025 24	Karlsruher SC	1–0	1. FC Köln	Karlsruhe
20:30 CET (UTC+1)	Kobald (yellow card) 3'; Burnić (yellow card) 42'; Hübers 52' (o.g.); Kaufmann (yellow card) 79'; Ben Farhat (yellow card) 89'	Report	Kainz (yellow card) 22'; Hübers (yellow card) 81'; Heintz (yellow card) 89'	Stadium: BBBank Wildpark; Attendance: 32,190; Referee: Richard Hempel

7 March 2025 25	SV Darmstadt 98	3–0	Karlsruher SC	Darmstadt
18:30 CET (UTC+1)	Lidberg 10'; Corredor 73'; Papela 79'	Report	Rapp (yellow card) 30'; Beifus (yellow card) 50'	Stadium: Merck-Stadion am Böllenfalltor; Attendance: 17,810; Referee: Felix Prigan

16 March 2025 26	Karlsruher SC	0–0	SSV Ulm 1846	Karlsruhe
13:30 CET (UTC+1)	Jensen (yellow card) 10'	Report	Krattenmacher (yellow card) 6'; Brandt (yellow card) 62'; Gaal (yellow card) 90+3'	Stadium: BBBank Wildpark; Attendance: 28,824; Referee: Patrick Schwengers

29 March 2025 27	Hertha BSC	3–1	Karlsruher SC	Berlin
13:00 CET (UTC+1)	Reese 16', 47'; Scherhant (yellow card) 28'; Demme (yellow card) 58'; Dárdai (yellow card) 63'; Schuler 89'	Report	Franke (yellow card) 30'; Beifus (yellow card) 34'; Kobald (yellow card) 37'; Rapp (yellow card) 39'; Heußer (yellow card) 51'; Wanitzek 55' (pen.)	Stadium: Olympiastadion; Attendance: 63,612; Referee: Patrick Alt

4 April 2025 28	Karlsruher SC	1–0	Hannover 96	Karlsruhe
18:30 CEST (UTC+2)	Kobald (yellow card) 27' (goal) 54'; Beifus (yellow card) 62'; Bormuth (yellow card) 83'; Conté (yellow card) 84'	Report	Knight (yellow card) 75'	Stadium: BBBank Wildpark; Attendance: 28,818; Referee: Florian Exner

13 April 2025 29	Preußen Münster	1–1	Karlsruher SC	Münster
13:30 CEST (UTC+2)	Koulis (yellow card) 7'; Bazzoli (yellow card) 49'; Mees (yellow card) 60'; Makridis (yellow card) 77'; Lorenz 73'; Kirkeskov (yellow card) 88'	Report	Ben Farhat 1' (yellow card) 55'	Stadium: Preußenstadion; Attendance: 12,422; Referee: Robin Braun

20 April 2025 30	Karlsruher SC	1–0	Greuther Fürth	Karlsruhe
13:30 CEST (UTC+2)	Burnić (yellow card) 50'; Rapp (yellow card) 68'; Wanitzek 75'; Franke (yellow card) 83'	Report	Dietz (yellow card) 76'; Klaus (yellow card) 79'	Stadium: BBBank Wildpark; Attendance: 26,155; Referee: Florian Heft

27 April 2025 31	Hamburger SV	1–2	Karlsruher SC	Hamburg
13:30 CEST (UTC+2)	Elfadli (yellow card) 27'; Selke 42' (pen.)	Report	Beifus (yellow card) 4'; Ben Farhat 30'; Wanitzek 45+4'; Burnić (yellow card) 51'; Jensen (yellow card) 67'; Heußer (yellow card) 90'; Rapp (yellow card) 90+5'	Stadium: Volksparkstadion; Attendance: 57,000; Referee: Florian Lechner

4 May 2025 32	Karlsruher SC	2–2	1. FC Kaiserslautern	Karlsruhe
13:30 CEST (UTC+2)	Ben Farhat 10'; Jung 58'; Jensen (yellow card) 89'	Report	Elvedi 31'; Hanslik 64'; Raschl (yellow card) 73'	Stadium: BBBank Wildpark; Attendance: 32,190; Referee: Tobias Stieler

11 May 2025 33	Jahn Regensburg	2–2	Karlsruher SC	Regensburg
13:30 CEST (UTC+2)	Bulić 17'; Hottmann 65'	Report	Wanitzek 4'; Burnić 31' (yellow card) 39'; Egloff (yellow card) 55'; Beifus (yellow card) 90+6'	Stadium: Jahnstadion Regensburg; Attendance: 12,708; Referee: Eric-Dominic Weisbach

18 May 2025 34	Karlsruher SC	3–0	SC Paderborn 07	Karlsruhe
15:30 CEST (UTC+2)	Egloff 50', 54'; Franke 73'	Report	Hansen (yellow card) 28'; Ansah (yellow card) 71'	Stadium: BBBank Wildpark; Attendance: 31,130; Referee: Deniz Aytekin

=== DFB-Pokal ===
18 August 2024 First round	Sportfreunde Lotte	0–5	Karlsruher SC	Lotte
18:00 CEST (UTC+2)		Report	Herold 2'; Wanitzek 21'; Sabah 49' (o.g.); Zivzivadze 69'; Conté 82'	Stadium: Stadion am Lotter Kreuz; Attendance: 4,637; Referee: Konrad Oldhafer

29 October 2024 Second round	Kickers Offenbach	0–2	Karlsruher SC	Offenbach
18:00 CET (UTC+1)	Arh-Česen (yellow card) 58'	Report	Zivzivadze 62'; Beifus 72'	Stadium: Stadion am Bieberer Berg; Attendance: 20,071; Referee: Lars Erbst

4 December 2024 Round of 16	Karlsruher SC	2–2 (a.e.t.) (4–5 p)	FC Augsburg	Karlsruhe
20:45 CET (UTC+1)	Schleusener 54'; Zivzivadze (yellow card) 94'; Wanitzek 111'	Report	Essende 40'; Schlotterbeck (yellow card) 80'; Maier (yellow card) 93'; Tietz (yellow card) 94'; Rexhbeçaj (yellow card) 120+1'; Vargas 120+3'	Stadium: BBBank Wildpark; Attendance: 28,422; Referee: Tobias Stieler
	Penalties
	Wanitzek (penalty scored); Hunziker (penalty scored); Beifus (penalty scored); Herold (penalty scored); Heußer (penalty missed)		Tietz (penalty scored); Schlotterbeck (penalty scored); Vargas (penalty scored); Rexhbeçaj (penalty scored); Bauer (penalty scored)
