= 2023–24 Karlsruher SC season =

Karlsruher SC
2023–24 season
- President: Holger Siegmund-Schultze
- Head coach: Christian Eichner
- Stadium: Wildparkstadion
- 2. Bundesliga: 5th
- DFB-Pokal: First round
- Top goalscorer: League: Igor Matanović (14); All: Igor Matanović (14)

The 2023–24 season was Karlsruher SC's 130th season in existence and fifth consecutive season in the 2. Bundesliga. They also competed in the DFB-Pokal.

== Players ==
=== First-team squad ===
As of 23 January 2024

Note: Flags indicate national team as defined under FIFA eligibility rules; some limited exceptions apply. Players may hold more than one non-FIFA nationality.

No.	Pos.	Nation	Player
1	GK	GER	Kai Eisele
2	DF	GER	Sebastian Jung
4	DF	GER	Marcel Beifus
5	DF	FIN	Daniel O'Shaughnessy
6	MF	GER	Leon Jensen
8	MF	GER	Jérôme Gondorf (captain)
9	FW	CRO	Igor Matanović (on loan from Eintracht Frankfurt)
10	MF	GER	Marvin Wanitzek
11	FW	GEO	Budu Zivzivadze
13	FW	GER	Lars Stindl
15	MF	BIH	Dženis Burnić
16	DF	GER	Philip Heise
17	MF	GER	Nicolai Rapp

No.	Pos.	Nation	Player
18	DF	GER	Daniel Brosinski
20	DF	GER	David Herold (on loan from Bayern Munich II)
21	DF	GER	Marco Thiede
22	DF	AUT	Christoph Kobald
23	GK	GER	Patrick Drewes
24	FW	GER	Fabian Schleusener
26	FW	GER	Paul Nebel (on loan from Mainz 05)
28	DF	GER	Marcel Franke
29	GK	GER	Max Weiß
30	MF	TUR	Eren Öztürk
31	MF	GER	Tim Rossmann
32	DF	GER	Robin Bormuth
39	MF	TUR	Efe-Kaan Sihlaroglu

=== Out on loan ===
Note: Flags indicate national team as defined under FIFA eligibility rules; some limited exceptions apply. Players may hold more than one non-FIFA nationality.

No.	Pos.	Nation	Player
—	FW	GER	Stefano Marino (at FC Astoria Walldorf until 30 June 2024)

== Transfers ==
=== In ===
Pos.	Player	Transferred from	Fee	Date	Source
GK	(Germany) Patrick Drewes	(Germany) SV Sandhausen	Free	1 July 2023	
DF	(Germany) Robin Bormuth	(Germany) SC Paderborn		5 July 2023	
MF	(Germany) Lars Stindl	(Germany) Borussia Mönchengladbach	Free	31 July 2023	
FW	(Croatia) Igor Matanović	(Germany) Eintracht Frankfurt	Loan	17 August 2023	

=== Out ===
Pos.	Player	Transferred from	Fee	Date	Source
GK	(Germany) Marius Gersbeck	(Germany) Hertha BSC	€300,000	1 July 2023	
MF	(Germany) Tim Breithaupt	(Germany) FC Augsburg	€2,500,000	1 July 2023	
DF	(Serbia) Lazar Mirković	Released		1 July 2023	
FW	(Turkey) Malik Batmaz	(Germany) Preußen Münster	Undisclosed	6 July 2023	
FW	(Switzerland) Simone Rapp	(Switzerland) Neuchâtel Xamax	Undisclosed	18 July 2023	
MF	(Austria) Kelvin Arase	(Germany) Waldhof Mannheim	Undisclosed	11 August 2023	
FW	(Germany) Stefano Marino	(Germany) Astoria Walldorf	Loan	1 September 2023	

== Pre-season and friendlies ==
Win Draw Loss Fixtures

Pre-season match details
Date	Time	Opponent	Venue	Result F–A	Scorers	Attendance	Ref.
28 June 2023	18:30	SpVgg Ketsch	Away	18–0	Stindl 3', Seidel 10', Marino 21', 35', 42', 54', 57', 85', Ersungur 24', Wanitzek 33', Jensen 44', Rapp 48', 75', Öztürk 61', 69', Nebel 64', Sihlaroglu 78', 81'		
2 July 2023	13:00	Türkgücü München	Neutral (Note: Match played at Rasenplatz BSA Heinrich-Wieland-Straße)	3–2			
6 July 2023	17:00	AEZ Zakakiou	Neutral (Note: Match played at Sportplatz Neukirchen am Großvenediger)	6–0	Rossmann 47', 85', Wanitzek 59', Herold 75', Marino 77', 78'		
10 July 2023	16:00	Viktoria Plzeň	Neutral (Note: Match played at Waldstadion Westendorf)	0–3			
15 July 2023	13:00	TSG Balingen	Home (Note: Match played at Platz 2 Wildparkstadion)	4–0			
19 July 2023	18:30	Liverpool	Home	2–4	Stindl 38', Jung 50'	20,000	
22 July 2023	15:30	Darmstadt 98	Home	0–0			
30 July 2023	11:00	FC 08 Homburg	Home	1–1			
7 September 2023	14:00	SC Freiburg	Neutral	0–1			
12 October 2023	14:30	Strasbourg	Home	3–0	Matanović 16', Schleusener 47', Stindl 62'		
16 November 2023	14:00	SSV Ulm	Home	0–2			
5 January 2024	13:30	SSV Ulm		4–0 (Note: Match was played in two periods of 60 minutes.)	Dettling 94', Ben Farhat 112', Wanitzek 113', Matanović 114'		
9 January 2024	16:00	Luzern	Neutral (Note: Match played at Banús Football Center)	3–1	Zivzivadze 8', Dettling 84', Schleusener 90'		
13 January 2024	14:00	1. FC Nürnberg	Neutral (Note: Match played at Complejo Deportivo Arroyo Enmedio)	3–1 (Note: Match was played in four periods of 30 minutes.)	Zivzivadze 24', Matanović 54', 76'		
18 February 2024	11:00	Kickers Offenbach	Home	1–5	Zivzivadze 65'		
21 March 2024	13:30	1. FC Heidenheim	Away	1–0	Ersungur 20'		

== Competitions ==
=== Overall record ===
Competition	First match	Last match	Starting round	Final position	Record							
Competition	First match	Last match	Starting round	Final position	Pld	W	D	L	GF	GA	GD	Win %
2. Bundesliga	29 July 2023	19 May 2024	Matchday 1		32	14	10	8	64	46	+18	43.75
DFB-Pokal	11 August 2023		First round	First round	1	0	0	1	1	2	−1	0.00
Total					33	14	10	9	65	48	+17	42.42

Last updated: 4 May 2024
Source: Soccerway

=== 2. Bundesliga ===
==== League table ====
Pos	Team	Pld	W	D	L	GF	GA	GD	Pts	Qualification or relegation
3	Fortuna Düsseldorf	34	18	9	7	72	40	+32	63	Qualification for promotion play-offs
4	Hamburger SV	34	17	7	10	64	44	+20	58	
5	Karlsruher SC	34	15	10	9	68	48	+20	55	
6	Hannover 96	34	13	13	8	59	44	+15	52	
7	SC Paderborn	34	15	7	12	54	54	0	52	

Source: DFB
Rules for classification: 1) Points; 2) Goal difference; 3) Goals scored; 4) Head-to-head results; 5) Head-to-head away goals scored; 6) Away goals scored; 7) Play-off.
(Rules 4–6 only apply after home and away matches have been played between the tied teams.)

==== Results summary ====
Overall								Home						Away					
Pld	W	D	L	GF	GA	GD	Pts	W	D	L	GF	GA	GD	W	D	L	GF	GA	GD
32	14	10	8	63	45	+18	52	9	5	2	38	20	+18	5	5	6	25	25	0

Last updated: 4 May 2024.
Source: DFB

==== Matches ====
The league fixtures were unveiled on 30 June 2023.

2. Bundesliga match details
Match	Date	Time	Opponent	Venue	Result F–A	Scorers	Attendance	League position	Ref.
1	29 July 2023	13:00	VfL Osnabrück	Away	3–2	Wanitzek 2', 36', Burnić 87'	15,741	4th	
2	6 August 2023	13:30	Hamburger SV	Home	2–2	Schleusener 14', Zivzivadze 90+5'	33,000	4th	
3	18 August 2023	18:30	Wehen Wiesbaden	Away	0–1		10,626	9th	
4	27 August 2023	13:30	Eintracht Braunschweig	Home	2–0	Jensen 25', Schleusener 67'	23,590	6th	
5	1 September 2023	18:30	Fortuna Düsseldorf	Away	1–3	Schleusener 4'	27,942	10th	
6	16 September 2023	13:00	1. FC Kaiserslautern	Home	1–1	Wanitzek 45+5' pen.	33,000	9th	
7	23 September 2023	13:00	Greuther Fürth	Away	3–4	Bormuth 7', Wanitzek 25', Stindl 45+4'	11,090	12th	
8	30 September 2023	13:00	Holstein Kiel	Home	0–2		21,982	14th	
9	7 October 2023	13:00	1. FC Magdeburg	Away	1–1	Schleusener 11'	24,366	14th	
10	22 October 2023	13:30	Schalke 04	Home	3–0	Stindl 22', Matanović 37', Matriciani 75' o.g.	33,000	12th	
11	28 October 2023	13:00	FC St. Pauli	Away	1–2	Matanović 43'	29,125	14th	
12	5 November 2023	13:30	SC Paderborn	Home	0–3		23,705	16th	
13	11 November 2023	20:30	Hertha BSC	Away	2–2	Zeefuik 10' o.g., Jensen 81	58,851	15th	
14	26 November 2023	13:30	1. FC Nürnberg	Home	4–1	Nebel 1', Schleusener 70', Zivzivadze 89', 90+4'	25,966	14th	
15	3 December 2023	13:30	Hansa Rostock	Home	2–2	Matanović 44', Zivzivadze 81'	23,159	14th	
16	8 December 2023	18:30	Hannover 96	Away	2–2	Halstenberg 11' o.g., Stindl 53'	26,200	14th	
17	17 December 2023	13:30	SV Elversberg	Home	3–2	Burnić 6', Zivzivadze 16', Matanović 53'	23,654	12th	
18	19 January 2024	18:30	VfL Osnabrück	Home	2–1	Kobald 4', Wanitzek 55'	21,077	11th	
19	28 January 2024	13:30	Hamburger SV	Away	4–3	Matanović 3', 5', Zivzivadze 46', Wanitzek 81'	51,776	8th	
20	2 February 2024	18:30	Wehen Wiesbaden	Home	2–2	Zivzivadze 35', Matanović 53'	20,407	8th	
21	10 February 2024	13:00	Eintracht Braunschweig	Away	0–2		19,595	11th	
22	17 February 2024	20:30	Fortuna Düsseldorf	Home	2–2	Gondorf 48', Herold 63'	26,563	11th	
23	24 February 2024	13:00	1. FC Kaiserslautern	Away	4–0	Wanitzek 51', Matanović 58', Nebel 81', Zivzivadze 90+1'	49,327	9th	
24	2 March 2024	20:30	Greuther Fürth	Home	4–0	Matanović 42', 78', Schleusener 86', 90'	26,043	8th	
25	9 March 2024	13:00	Holstein Kiel	Away	0–1		15,034	9th	
26	17 March 2024	13:30	1. FC Magdeburg	Home	7–0	Franke 8', Zivzivadze 13', 25', Nebel 40', Beifus 50', Matanović 51', Wanitzek 90+2' pen.	27,028	7th	
27	31 March 2024	13:30	Schalke 04	Away	0–0		61,653	6th	
28	6 April 2024	20:30	FC St. Pauli	Home	2–1	Franke 2', Nebel 69'	33,000	6th	
29	13 April 2024	13:00	SC Paderborn	Away	1–1	Matanović 26'	12,387	7th	
30	21 April 2024	13:30	Hertha BSC	Home	3–2	Thiede 16', Matanović 45', Wanitzek 77'	33,000	5th	
31	28 April 2024	13:30	1. FC Nürnberg	Away	1–0	Matanović 37'	35,162	5th	
32	4 May 2024	13:00	Hansa Rostock	Away	2–1	Zivzivadze 52', Wanitzek 56' pen.	26,500	5th	
33	12 May 2024	13:30	Hannover 96	Home	1–2	Nebel 44'	32,140	5th	
34	19 May 2024	15:30	SV Elversberg	Away	3–0	Zivzivadze 52', Heise 56', Stindl 79'	9,502	5th	

=== DFB-Pokal ===
DFB-Pokal match details
Round	Date	Time	Opponent	Venue	Result F–A	Scorers	Attendance	Ref.
First round	11 August 2023	18:00	1. FC Saarbrücken	Away	1–2	Stindl 65'	14,284	
