= Max Weiß (footballer) =

German footballer (born 2004)

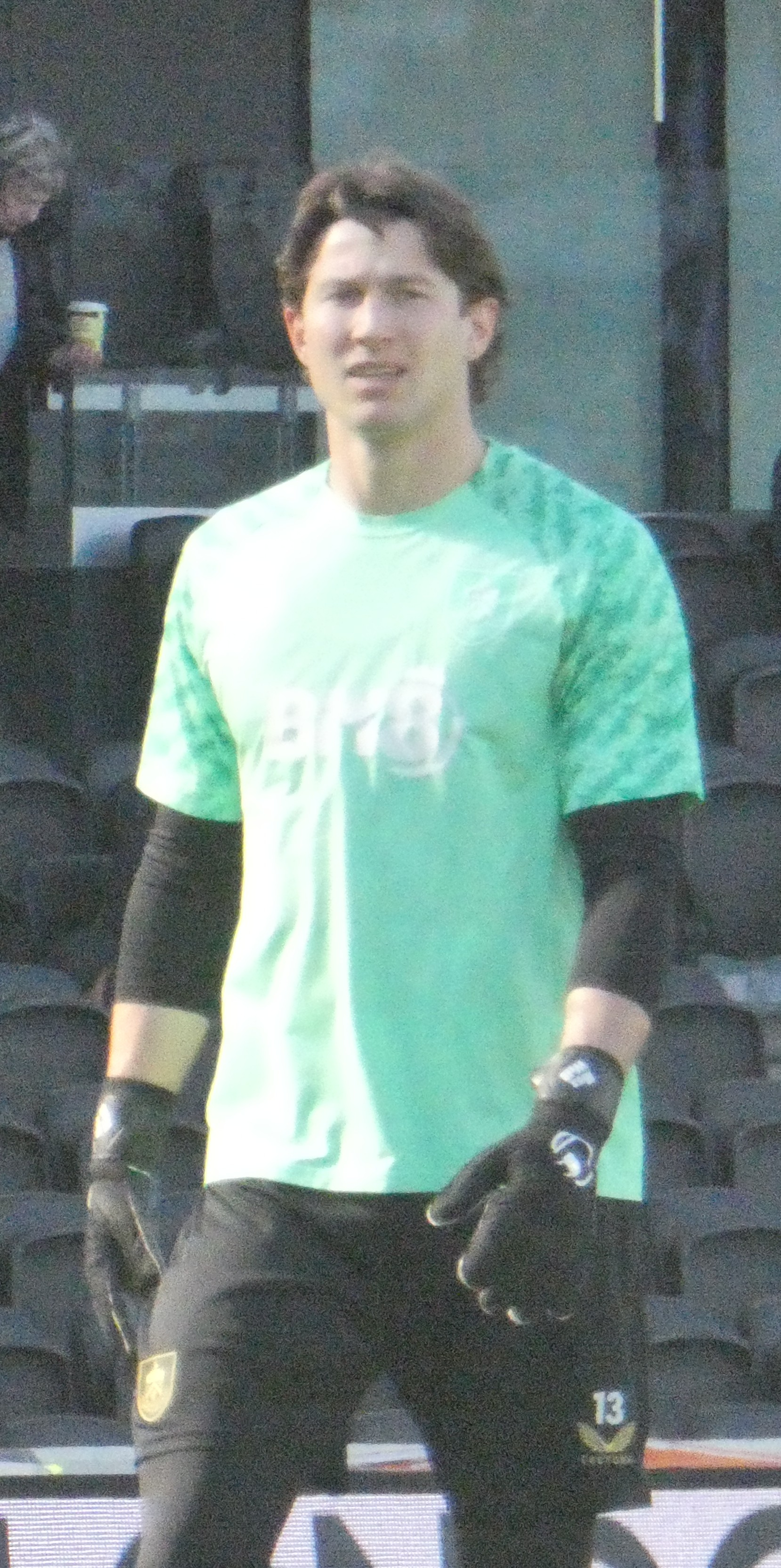
- Max Weiß in 2026

Personal information
- Full name: Max Oliver Weiß
- Date of birth: 15 June 2004 (age 22)
- Place of birth: Speyer, Germany
- Height: 1.90 m (6 ft 3 in)
- Position: Goalkeeper

Team information
- Current team: Burnley
- Number: 1

Youth career
- –2018: TSG Hoffenheim
- 2018–2019: SV Sandhausen
- 2019–2022: Karlsruher SC

Senior career*
Years	Team	Apps	(Gls)
2022–2025	Karlsruher SC	38	(0)
2025–	Burnley	10	(0)

International career^{‡}
2021	Germany U18	1	(0)
2022	Germany U19	3	(0)
2024–2025	Germany U20	3	(0)
2026–	Germany U21	1	(0)
- * Club domestic league appearances and goals as of 18:08, 12 September 2026 (UTC) ‡ National team caps and goals as of 21:10, 30 September 2026 (UTC)

Max Oliver Weiß (born 15 June 2004) is a German professional footballer who plays as a goalkeeper for EFL Championship club Burnley.

== Club career ==
Born in Speyer, Weiß played for TSG Hoffenheim and SV Sandhausen's academies, and joined Karlsruher SC's academy after being released from Sandhausen's in 2019. In January 2022, he signed his first professional contract with Karlsruhe, until summer 2026. He made his debut on 15 May 2022, starting in a 2–0 defeat away to 1. FC Heidenheim in the final match of the 2021–22 season.

In summer 2024, Weiß signed a new contract with Karlsruhe, valid until summer 2029. Following the sale of goalkeeper Patrick Drewes to VfL Bochum, Weiß became first-choice goalkeeper at Karlsruhe and started every match of the 2024–25 season.

=== Burnley ===
On 25 June 2025, Weiß joined Premier League club Burnley on a four-year deal for an undisclosed fee, which was reported to be £4,300,000. He made his debut for the club, starting the whole game, in a 2-1 win against Derby County in the second round of the EFL Cup. Having been used as a starter for Burnley's matches in the cup competitions, Weiß made his Premier League debut, having been chosen to start over Martin Dúbravka, in a 2-2 draw against Aston Villa on 10 May 2026. He made two more Premier League appearances against Arsenal and Wolverhampton Wanderers. At the end of the 2025-26 season, Weiß made seven appearances in all competitions.

At the start of the 2026-27 season, Weiß was given a number one shirt following Dúbravka's departure. He started in goal against Notts County in the first round of the EFL Cup, having played all the way to extra time following a 1-1 draw and saved two penalties, in a 4-3 win to advance to the next round. Having started Burnley's first eight matches of the season, Weiß' performances came under criticism when he made a howler, leading to Adam Idah score in the 13th minute, as the club loss 3-1 against Swansea City on 12 September 2026.

== International career ==
Weiß has represented Germany at under-18, under-19 and under-20 international levels.

== Career statistics ==
As of match played 12 September 2026

Appearances and goals by club, season and competition
Club	Season	League			National cup (Note: Includes DFB-Pokal, FA Cup)		League cup (Note: Includes EFL Cup)		Other		Total	
Club	Season	Division	Apps	Goals	Apps	Goals	Apps	Goals	Apps	Goals	Apps	Goals
Karlsruher SC	2021–22	2. Bundesliga	1	0	0	0	—		—		1	0
Karlsruher SC	2022–23	2. Bundesliga	1	0	1	0	—		—		2	0
Karlsruher SC	2023–24	2. Bundesliga	2	0	0	0	—		—		2	0
Karlsruher SC	2024–25	2. Bundesliga	34	0	3	0	—		—		37	0
Karlsruher SC	Total		38	0	4	0	—		—		42	0
Burnley	2025–26	Premier League	3	0	2	0	2	0	—		7	0
Burnley	2026–27	Championship	7	0	0	0	1	0	—		8	0
Burnley	Total		10	0	2	0	3	0	—		15	0
Career total			48	0	6	0	3	0	0	0	57	0
