= 2021–22 Karlsruher SC season =

Karlsruher SC
2021–22 season
- President: Ingo Wellenreuther
- Manager: Christian Eichner
- Stadium: Wildparkstadion
- 2. Bundesliga: 12th
- DFB-Pokal: Quarter-final
- Top goalscorer: League: Philipp Hofmann (3 goals); All: Philipp Hofmann (3 goals)

The 2021–22 season was Karlsruher SC's 70th season in existence and the club's third consecutive season in the 2. Bundesliga, the second tier of German football. The club also participated in the DFB-Pokal.

== Background and pre-season ==
Karlsruher SC finished the 2020–21 season in 6th place, 10 points below the automatic promotion places and 12 points below the promotion play-off place.

== Friendly matches ==
Pre-season match details
Date	Time	Opponent	Venue	Result F–A	Scorers	Attendance	Ref.
26 June 2021	14:00	SGV Freiberg	Home	2–0	Choi 81' o.g., Hofmann 85'	500	
30 June 2021	18:30	Bahlinger SC	Away	0–0	—	500	
3 July 2021	14:00	Viktoria Köln	Neutral (Note: Match played in Bad Wörishofen, Germany)	5–1	Wanitzek 56' pen., 72', 77', Kother 60', Hofmann 74'		
7 July 2021	18:30	FC Kufstein	Neutral (Note: Match played at Smaragd-Arena in Bramberg am Wildkogel, Austria)	4–0	Kobald 11', Schleusener 19', Batmaz 65', Cueto 70'	200	
11 July 2021	13:00	Türkgücü München	Neutral (Note: Match played in St. Ulrich am Pillersee)	0–0	—	0	
11 July 2021	16:30	Zenit St. Petersburg	Neutral (Note: Match played in St. Johann in Tirol)	1–3	Gondorf 52' pen.	300	
17 July 2021	14:00	1. FC Saarbrücken	Home	1–0	Hofmann 62'	350	
4 August 2021	15:30	TSG Hoffenheim	Away (Note: Match played at Akademie-Arena, Kunstrasen)	0–5	—		
2 September 2021	13:00	Mainz 05	Away	0–0	—	500	

== Competitions ==
=== 2. Bundesliga ===
==== League table ====
Pos	Team	Pld	W	D	L	GF	GA	GD	Pts
10	Fortuna Düsseldorf	34	11	11	12	45	42	+3	44
11	Hannover 96	34	11	9	14	35	49	−14	42
12	Karlsruher SC	34	9	14	11	54	55	−1	41
13	Hansa Rostock	34	10	11	13	41	52	−11	41
14	SV Sandhausen	34	10	11	13	42	54	−12	41

Source: DFB
Rules for classification: 1) Points; 2) Goal difference; 3) Goals scored; 4) Head-to-head points; 5) Head-to-head goal difference; 6) Head-to-head away goals scored; 7) Away goals scored; 8) Play-off.

==== Matches ====
2. Bundesliga match details
Match	Date	Time	Opponent	Venue	Result F–A	Scorers	Attendance	League position	Ref.
1	24 July 2021	13:30	Hansa Rostock	Away	3–1	Kobald 42', Hofmann 44', Jung 79'	14,500	3rd	
2	30 July 2021	18:30	Darmstadt 98	Home	3–0	Hofmann 9', 79', Choi 76'	9,750	1st	
3	14 August 2021	13:30	SV Sandhausen	Away	0–0	—	4,908	2nd	
4	21 August 2021	13:30	Werder Bremen	Home	0–0	—	10,000	4th	
5	27 August 2021	18:30	1. FC Nürnberg	Away	1–2	Batmaz 82'	13,120	6th	
6	11 September 2021	13:30	Holstein Kiel	Home	2–2	Choi 39', Hofmann 88'	10,000	8th	
7	17 September 2021	18:30	Schalke 04	Away	2–1	Choi 1', Wanikzek 88'	24,000	5th	
8	25 September 2021	13:30	FC St. Pauli	Home	1–3	Schleusener 79'	12,500	9th	
9	2 October 2021	13:30	Jahn Regensburg	Away	2–2	Wanikzek 14', Thiede 51'	8,790	10th	
10	16 October 2021	13:30	Erzgebirge Aue	Home	2–1	Schleusener 46', Hofmann 67'	12,000	7th	
11	23 October 2021	13:30	Fortuna Düsseldorf	Away	1–3	Wanitzek 22'	22,458	8th	
12	31 October 2021	13:30	SC Paderborn	Home	2–4	Schleusener 68', Hofmann 70'	14,039	9th	
13	6 November 2021	20:30	Hamburger SV	Home	1–1	Hofmann 18'	20,000	10th	
14	21 November 2021	13:30	Ingolstadt 04	Away	1–1	Kother 42'	4,348	10th	
15	27 November 2021	13:30	Hannover 96	Home	4–0	Choi 17', Gordon 27', Wanitzek 29', Hofmann 83'	10,000	9th	
16	5 December 2021	13:30	Dynamo Dresden	Away	1–3	Schleusener 52'	0	10th	
17	12 December 2021	13:30	1. FC Heidenheim	Home	3–2	Batmaz 8', 39', Wanitzek 56' pen.	750	10th	
18	19 December 2021	13:30	Hansa Rostock	Home	2–2	Gordon 13', Hofmann 26'	750	10th	
19	15 January 2022	20:30	Darmstadt 98	Away	2–2	Gjasula 22' o.g., Schleusener 71'	250	10th	
21	5 February 2022	13:30	Werder Bremen	Away	1–2	Hofmann 59'	10,000	11th	
20	8 February 2022	18:30	SV Sandhausen	Home	0–2		6,532	11th	
22	12 February 2022	13:30	1. FC Nürnberg	Home	4–1	Hofmann 39', 59', Goller 55', Wanitzek 90' pen.	9,265	11th	
23	19 February 2022	13:30	Holstein Kiel	Away	2–0	O'Shaughnessy 16', Schleusener 67'	7,953	9th	
24	26 February 2022	13:30	Schalke 04	Home	1–1	Choi 34'	15,000	9th	
25	5 March 2022	13:30	FC St. Pauli	Away	1–3	Hofmann 66'	22,158	9th	
26	13 March 2022	13:30	Jahn Regensburg	Home	1–1	Hofmann 70'	13,258	9th	
27	18 March 2022	18:30	Erzgebirge Aue	Away	3–0	Hofmann 54', Wanitzek 67', Lorenz 85'	6,619	9th	
28	3 April 2022	13:30	Fortuna Düsseldorf	Home	2–2	Wanitzek 65' pen., Hofmann 83'	17,907	9th	
29	10 April 2022	13:30	SC Paderborn	Away	2–2	Wanitzek 36', Hofmann 69'	9,652	9th	
30	16 April 2022	20:30	Hamburger SV	Away	0–3		24,892	10th	
31	22 April 2022	18:30	Ingolstadt 04	Home	2–2	Schleusener 69', Hofmann 75'	16,655	9th	
32	29 April 2022	18:30	Hannover 96	Away	0–2		13,700	12th	
33	8 May 2022	13:30	Dynamo Dresden	Home	2–2	Gondorf 65', Hofmann 74'	18,649	11th	
34	15 May 2022	15:30	1. FC Heidenheim	Away	0–2		10,599	12th	

=== DFB-Pokal ===
DFB-Pokal match details
Round	Date	Time	Opponent	Venue	Result F–A	Scorers	Attendance	Ref.
Second round	27 October 2021	18:30	Bayer Leverkusen	Away	2–1	Cueto 5', Choi 63'	13,060	
Round of 16	18 January 2022	18:30	1860 Munich	Away	1–0	Wanikzek 69' pen.		
Quarter-final	2 March 2022	18:30	Hamburger SV	Away	2–3 (a.e.t.)	Heise 40', Hofmann 50'	25,000	

== Transfers ==
=== Transfers in ===
Date	Position	Name	From (Note: Brackets denote that the player's contract with that club had expired before he joined Karlsruher SC.)	Fee	Ref.
8 June 2021	MF	Lucas Cueto	Viktoria Köln	Undisclosed	
8 June 2021	MF	Fabio Kaufmann	Eintracht Braunschweig	Undisclosed	
11 June 2021	DF	Philip Heise	Norwich City	Free	
25 June 2021	FW	Fabian Schleusener	1. FC Nürnberg	Undisclosed	
1 July 2021	MF	Leon Jensen	(FSV Zwickau)	Free	
20 July 2021	GK	Niklas Heeger	(VfB Stuttgart II)	Free	

=== Loans in ===
Date	Position	Name	Club	Return	Ref.

=== Transfers out ===
Date	Position	Name	To (Note: Brackets denote that the player joined that club after his Karlsruher SC contract expired)	Fee	Ref.
20 June 2021	MF	David Trivunic	FC Nöttingen	Undisclosed	
30 June 2021	DF	David Pisot	(SpVgg Unterhaching)	Released	
30 June 2021	DF	Alexander Groiß	(1. FC Saarbrücken)	Released	
30 June 2021	FW	Babacar Gueye	Unattached	Released	
5 July 2021	DF	Dirk Carlson	Erzgebirge Aue	Undisclosed	

=== Loans out ===
Date	Position	Name	Club	Return	Ref.
7 July 2021	DF	Luca Bolay	1. FC Nürnberg II	End of season	
