= 2024–25 SC Preußen Münster season =

SC Preußen Münster
2024–25 season
- Manager: Sascha Hildmann (until 27 April); Kieran Schulze-Marmeling (caretaker; from 28 April)
- Stadium: Preußenstadion
- 2. Bundesliga: 15th
- DFB-Pokal: First round

The 2024–25 season is the 119th season in the history of SC Preußen Münster. In addition to the domestic league, the team is scheduled to participate in the DFB-Pokal.

== Transfers ==
=== In ===
Pos.	Player	Transferred from	Fee	Date	Source
GK	(Germany) Morten Behrens	(Germany) Darmstadt 98	Free	1 July 2024	
FW	(Germany) Etienne Amenyido	(Germany) FC St Pauli	Free	10 July 2024	
MF	(Netherlands) Jorrit Hendrix	(Australia) Western Sydney Wanderers	Free	23 July 2024	

== Friendlies ==
=== Pre-season ===
30 June 2024 Friendly	1. FC Gievenbeck (Germany)	0–4	(Germany) Preußen Münster
15:00

6 July 2024 Friendly	Preußen Münster (Germany)	3–2	(Germany) BSV Kickers Emden
18:30

6 July 2024 Friendly	Preußen Münster (Germany)	4–0	(Germany) Sportfreunde Lotte
14:00

10 July 2024 Friendly	Preußen Münster (Germany)	v	(Germany) MSV Duisburg

12 July 2024 Friendly	VfL Oythe (Germany)	0–7	(Germany) Preußen Münster
18:30

19 July 2024 Friendly	Preußen Münster (Germany)	0–0	(Netherlands) Heracles Almelo
18:00

=== Mid-season ===
5 September 2024 Friendly	Preußen Münster (Germany)	3–2	(Germany) Werder Bremen
18:00

10 January 2025 Friendly	Preußen Münster (Germany)	0–0	(Hungary) Ferencváros	Spain
14:00

20 March 2025 Friendly	VfL Bochum (Germany)	4–2	(Germany) Preußen Münster
15:00

== Competitions ==
=== 2. Bundesliga ===
==== League table ====
Pos	Team	Pld	W	D	L	GF	GA	GD	Pts	Promotion, qualification or relegation
13	Greuther Fürth	34	10	9	15	45	59	−14	39	
14	Schalke 04	34	10	8	16	52	62	−10	38	
15	Preußen Münster	34	8	12	14	40	43	−3	36	
16	Eintracht Braunschweig (O)	34	8	11	15	38	64	−26	35	Qualification for relegation play-offs
17	SSV Ulm (R)	34	6	12	16	36	48	−12	30	Relegation to 3. Liga

Source: Bundesliga
Rules for classification: 1) Points; 2) Goal difference; 3) Goals scored; 4) Head-to-head results; 5) Head-to-head away goals scored; 6) Away goals scored; 7) Play-off.
(Rules 4–6 only apply after home and away matches have been played between the tied teams.)
(O) Play-off winners; (R) Relegated

==== Matches ====
The match schedule was released on 4 July 2024.

2. Bundesliga match details
Match	Date	Time	Opponent	Venue	Result F–A	Scorers	Attendance	Ref.
1	4 August 2024	13:30	SpVgg Greuther Fürth	A	1–3	Batmaz 41'	12,664	
2	11 August 2024	13:30	Hannover 96	H	0–0		12,422	
3	24 August 2024	13:00	1. FC Kaiserslautern	H	0–1		12,422	
4	31 August 2024	13:00	Hamburger SV	A	1–4	Paetow 58'	57,000	
5	13 September 2024	18:30	SC Paderborn 07	H	3–3	Mees 19', 90+1', Friðjónsson 78'	12,422	
6	22 September 2024	13:30	Jahn Regensburg	A	3–0	Grodowski 29', Makridis 60', Friðjónsson 71'	12,554	
7	28 September 2024	20:30	FC Schalke 04	H	1–2	Makridis 53'	12,422	
8	5 October 2024	13:00	1. FC Nürnberg	A	2–3	Frenkert 16', Paetow 43'	27,312	
9	19 October 2024	13:00	SV Elversberg	H	1–1	Mees 20'	11,507	
10	27 October 2024	13:30	Eintracht Braunschweig	A	1–1	Hendrix 16'	21,809	
11	1 November 2024	18:30	Fortuna Düsseldorf	H	1–0	ter Horst 26'	12,422	
12	10 November 2024	13:30	Karlsruher SC	A	1–1	Frenkert 90+2'	30,083	
13	22 November 2024	18:45	1. FC Köln	H	0–1		12,422	
14	30 November 2024	20:30	SV Darmstadt 98	A	0–0		17,569	
15	7 December 2024	20:30	1. FC Magdeburg	H	1–2	Mees 38'	12,422	
16	13 December 2024	18:30	Hertha BSC	A	2–1	Kyerewaa 57', Paetow 87'	45,767	
17	21 December 2024	13:00	SSV Ulm	H	0–0		11,941	
18	18 January 2025	13:00	SpVgg Greuther Fürth	H	2–1	Mees 10', 90'	11,791	
19	26 January 2025	13:30	Hannover 96	A	2–2	Mees 21', Pick 71'	36,100	
20	2 February 2025	13:30	1. FC Kaiserslautern	A	1–2	Kinsombi 79'	42,901	
21	7 February 2025	18:30	Hamburger SV	H	1–2	Frenkert 24'	12,422	
22	14 February 2025	18:30	SC Paderborn 07	A	0–2		14,534	
23	22 February 2025	13:00	Jahn Regensburg	H	2–0	Friðjónsson 42', Scherder 69'	11,586	
24	28 February 2025	18:30	FC Schalke 04	A	0–1		62,077	
25	9 March 2025	13:30	1. FC Nürnberg	H	0–1		12,422	
26	15 March 2025	13:00	SV Elversberg	A	1–0	Scherder 70'	10,157	
27	30 March 2025	13:30	Eintracht Braunschweig	H	1–1	Lorenz 4' pen.	12,422	
28	5 April 2025	13:00	Fortuna Düsseldorf	A	0–1		52,000	
29	13 April 2025	13:30	Karlsruher SC	H	1–1	Lorenz 73' pen.	12,422	
30	20 April 2025	13:30	1. FC Köln	A	1–3	Hübers 39' o.g.	50,000	
31	26 April 2025	13:00	SV Darmstadt 98	H	1–1	Mees 63'	12,422	
32	2 May 2025	18:30	1. FC Magdeburg	A	5–0	Hendrix 12', Lorenz 15', 43' pen., Mees 52', Kyerewaa 54'	26,800	
33	9 May 2025	18:30	Hertha BSC	H	2–0	Hendrix 30', 70'	12,422	
34	18 May 2025	15:30	SSV Ulm	A	2–2	Bouchama 54', Kyerewaa 75'	17,400	

=== DFB-Pokal ===
DFB-Pokal match details
Round	Date	Time	Opponent	Venue	Result F–A	Scorers	Attendance	Ref.
First round	27 August 2024	20:45	VfB Stuttgart	H	0–5		12,672	
