= Budu Zivzivadze =

Georgian footballer

Budu Zivzivadze ბუდუ ზივზივაძე
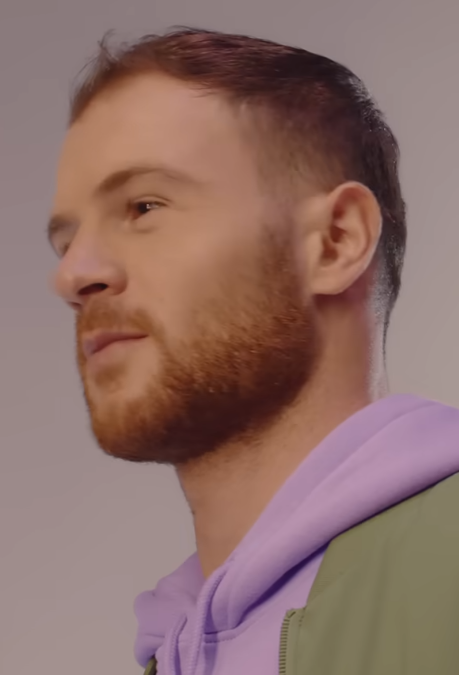
- Zivzivadze in 2024

Personal information
- Date of birth: 10 March 1994 (age 32)
- Place of birth: Kutaisi, Georgia
- Height: 6 ft 3 in (1.91 m)
- Position: Striker

Team information
- Current team: 1. FC Heidenheim
- Number: 11

Youth career
- 2009–2011: School No. 35 Tbilisi
- 2011–2012: Dinamo Tbilisi

Senior career*
Years	Team	Apps	(Gls)
2012–2014	Dinamo Tbilisi	1	(0)
2012–2014	→ Dinamo-2 Tbilisi	50	(47)
2015	Torpedo Kutaisi	8	(0)
2015–2016	Samtredia	44	(29)
2017–2019	Esbjerg	13	(1)
2018	→ Dinamo Tbilisi (loan)	35	(22)
2019	Torpedo Kutaisi	20	(13)
2019–2020	Mezőkövesd	32	(8)
2020–2023	Fehérvár	53	(12)
2022	→ Újpest (loan)	12	(11)
2023–2025	Karlsruher SC	57	(25)
2025–	1. FC Heidenheim	40	(11)

International career^{‡}
2011	Georgia U17	3	(0)
2013	Georgia U19	9	(2)
2014–2016	Georgia U21	4	(0)
2017–	Georgia	47	(8)
- * Club domestic league appearances and goals as of 20 September 2026 ‡ National team caps and goals as of 18 November 2026

Budu Zivzivadze (Order of Honor) (Georgian: ბუდუ ზივზივაძე; born 10 March 1994) is a Georgian professional footballer who plays as a striker for 2. Bundesliga club 1. FC Heidenheim and the Georgia national team.

Being the winner of the Umaglesi Liga and the Georgian Super Cup, he was named the Georgian Player of the Year in 2016.

== Early life ==
Budu Zivzivadze was born on 10 March 1994 in Kutaisi, Imereti, to Kakha Zivzivadze and Rusudan Gegeshidze and has one elder sister. He was named in honour of his grandfather who died at early age.

As a child, Budu attended chess and dancing classes before football swept him up.

== Club career ==
At age 8, Budu Zivzivadze entered the Imedi football school in Kutaisi. He was a midfielder during the initial two years.

In 2011, he joined Dinamo Tbilisi. During the four seasons at this club, he mainly played for its reserve team taking part in Pirveli Liga. With 23 goals netted in 21 matches for Dinamo-2 in 2013–14, Zivzivadze became the topscorer. He made a professional debut with the senior team on 11 September 2014 in an away game against Metalurgi Rustavi as a second-half substitute.

In 2015, Zivzivadze moved to the top-tier club Samtredia, where he displayed his goalscoring abilities and played a crucial role in winning their first ever champion's title. The striker was named the best player of the 2016 season.

Budu signed with Danish Superliga club Esbjerg fB in January 2017, but did not play much until he was loaned out to Dinamo Tbilisi for the 2018 season. He did very well, scoring 28 goals in all competitions. Zivzivadze shared a topscorer's award with Giorgi Gabedava. Also, he was included in symbolic team of the season. After returning to Esbjerg, the club announced on 29 January 2019, that he had left the club, this time permanently, after his contract was terminated by mutual consent.

Two days later, it was announced, that he had re-joined Torpedo Kutaisi. Zivzivadze was named by Erovnuli Liga as the best player of part 2 of the four-phase championship after netting eight goals in nine games. Due to Torpedo's financial troubles, his second tenure with this team lasted six months.

In July 2019, he signed for Nemzeti Bajnokság I side Mezőkövesd.

On 11 February 2022, Zivzivadze was loaned by Fehérvár to Újpest until the end of the season.

On 31 January 2023, the last day of the 2022–23 winter transfer window, Zivzivadze signed with 2. Bundesliga club Karlsruher SC until 2025. His contract with Fehérvár had been due to run out in the summer.

During his second season at Karlsruher, Zivzivadze netted twelve goals in 30 league matches and became the team's second topscorer after Igor Matanović. The player improved his own record in 2024–25 with the same number of goals scored in 17 games, which made him the league topscorer at half season.

On 3 January 2025, Zivzivadze moved to Bundesliga club Heidenheim on a four-year deal. He opened his goal-scoring account in a 1–1 draw at Hoffenheim on 9 March.

== International career ==
Zivzivadze made his debut for the Georgia national team in a friendly match against Uzbekistan on 23 January 2017. He scored his first goal for the senior national team on 25 March 2022, the only goal in a 1–0 friendly win against Bosnia and Herzegovina.

On 21 March 2024, Zivzivadze bagged a vital brace in a 2–0 win over Luxemburg in UEFA Euro 2024 qualifying play-offs, which eventually helped the team to reach European Championship for the first time in their history. He received a call-up for Euro 2024 and took part in two matches.

== Personal life ==
Zivzivadze is married to Nini Kvernadze. Their daughter was born during the COVID-19 period. For this reason, Budu was unable to see her until she turned six months old.

== Career statistics ==
=== Club ===
As of match played 20 September 2026

Appearances and goals by club, season and competition
Club	Season	League			National cup (Note: Includes Georgian Cup, Danish Cup, Magyar Kupa, DFB-Pokal)		Continental		Other		Total	
Club	Season	Division	Apps	Goals	Apps	Goals	Apps	Goals	Apps	Goals	Apps	Goals
Dinamo Tbilisi B	2012–13	Pirveli Liga	19	14	―		—		—		19	14
Dinamo Tbilisi B	2013–14	Pirveli Liga	21	23	―		—		—		21	23
Dinamo Tbilisi B	2014–15	Pirveli Liga	10	10	―		—		—		10	10
Dinamo Tbilisi B	Total		50	47	―		—		—		50	47
Dinamo Tbilisi	2014–15	Umaglesi Liga	1	0	―		—		—		1	0
Torpedo Kutaisi	2014–15	Umaglesi Liga	8	0	2	0	—		—		10	0
Samtredia	2015–16	Umaglesi Liga	29	16	5	2	―		—		34	18
Samtredia	2016	Umaglesi Liga	14	13	2	1	2 (Note: Appearances in UEFA Europa League)	1	—		18	15
Samtredia	Total		43	29	7	3	2	1	―		52	33
Esbjierg	2016–17	Danish Superliga	7	0	2	1	―		—		9	1
Esbjierg	2017–18	Danish 1st Division	4	0	―		—		—		4	0
Esbjierg	Total		11	0	2	1	―		—		13	1
Dinamo Tbilisi (loan)	2018	Erovnuli Liga	35	22	3	4	2	2	—		40	28
Torpedo Kutaisi	2019	Erovnuli Liga	20	13	1	0	—		1 (Note: Appearance in Georgian Super Cup)	0	22	13
Mezőkövesd	2019–20	Nemzeti Bajnokság I	32	8	6	2	—		—		38	10
Fehérvár	2020–21	Nemzeti Bajnokság I	31	9	4	3	3	0	—		38	11
Fehérvár	2021–22	Nemzeti Bajnokság I	12	2	―		2 (Note: Appearances in UEFA Europa Conference League)	0	—		14	2
Fehérvár	2022–23	Nemzeti Bajnokság I	10	1	―		6	6	—		16	7
Fehérvár	Total		53	12	4	3	11	6	—		68	21
Újpest (loan)	2021–22	Nemzeti Bajnokság I	12	11	2	0	—		—		14	11
Karlsruher SC	2022–23	2.Bundesliga	10	1	―		―		—		10	1
Karlsruher SC	2023–24	2.Bundesliga	30	12	1	0	―		—		31	12
Karlsruher SC	2024–25	2.Bundesliga	18	12	2	2	―		—		20	14
Karlsruher SC	Total		58	25	3	2	—		—		61	27
1. FC Heidenheim	2024–25	Bundesliga	15	2	―		2	0	2 (Note: Appearances in relegation play-offs)	0	19	2
1. FC Heidenheim	2025–26	Bundesliga	20	6	2	0	—		—		22	6
1. FC Heidenheim	2026–27	2. Bundesliga	5	3	1	0	—		—		6	3
1. FC Heidenheim	Total		40	11	3	0	2	0	2	0	47	11
Career total			363	178	33	15	17	9	3	0	416	202

=== International ===
As of match played 17 November 2026

Appearances and goals by national team and year
National team	Year	Apps	Goals
Georgia	2017	2	0
Georgia	2018	2	0
Georgia	2021	4	0
Georgia	2022	7	3
Georgia	2023	8	2
Georgia	2024	11	3
Georgia	2025	5	0
Georgia	2026	8	0
Total		47	8

Scores and results list Georgia's goal tally first, score column indicates score after each Zivzivadze goal.

List of international goals scored by Budu Zivzivadze
No.	Date	Venue	Opponent	Score	Result	Competition	Ref.
1	25 March 2022	Bilino Polje Stadium, Zenica, Bosnia and Herzegovina	Bosnia and Herzegovina	1–0	1–0	Friendly	
2	5 June 2022	Huvepharma Arena, Razgrad, Bulgaria	Bulgaria	3–1	5–2	2022–23 UEFA Nations League C	
3	9 June 2022	Toše Proeski Arena, Skopje, North Macedonia	North Macedonia	1–0	3–0	2022–23 UEFA Nations League C	
4	25 March 2023	Adjarabet Arena, Batumi, Georgia	Mongolia	6–1	6–1	Friendly	
5	12 September 2023	Ullevaal Stadion, Oslo, Norway	Norway	1–2	1–2	2024 UEFA Euro qualifiers	
6	21 March 2024	Boris Paichadze Dinamo Arena, Tbilisi, Georgia	Luxembourg	1–0	2–0	UEFA Euro 2024 qualifying play-offs	
7	21 March 2024	Boris Paichadze Dinamo Arena, Tbilisi, Georgia	Luxembourg	2–0	2–0	UEFA Euro 2024 qualifying play-offs	
8	9 June 2024	Podgorica City Stadium, Podgorica, Montenegro	Montenegro	3–1	3–1	Friendly	

== Honours ==
Samtredia

- Umaglesi Liga: 2016

Torpedo Kutaisi

- Georgian Super Cup: 2019

Individual

- Player of the Year in Georgia: 2016
- Erovnuli Liga top scorer: 2016, 2018 (shared)
- Order of Honor: 2024
