= David Herold (footballer) =

German footballer (born 2003)

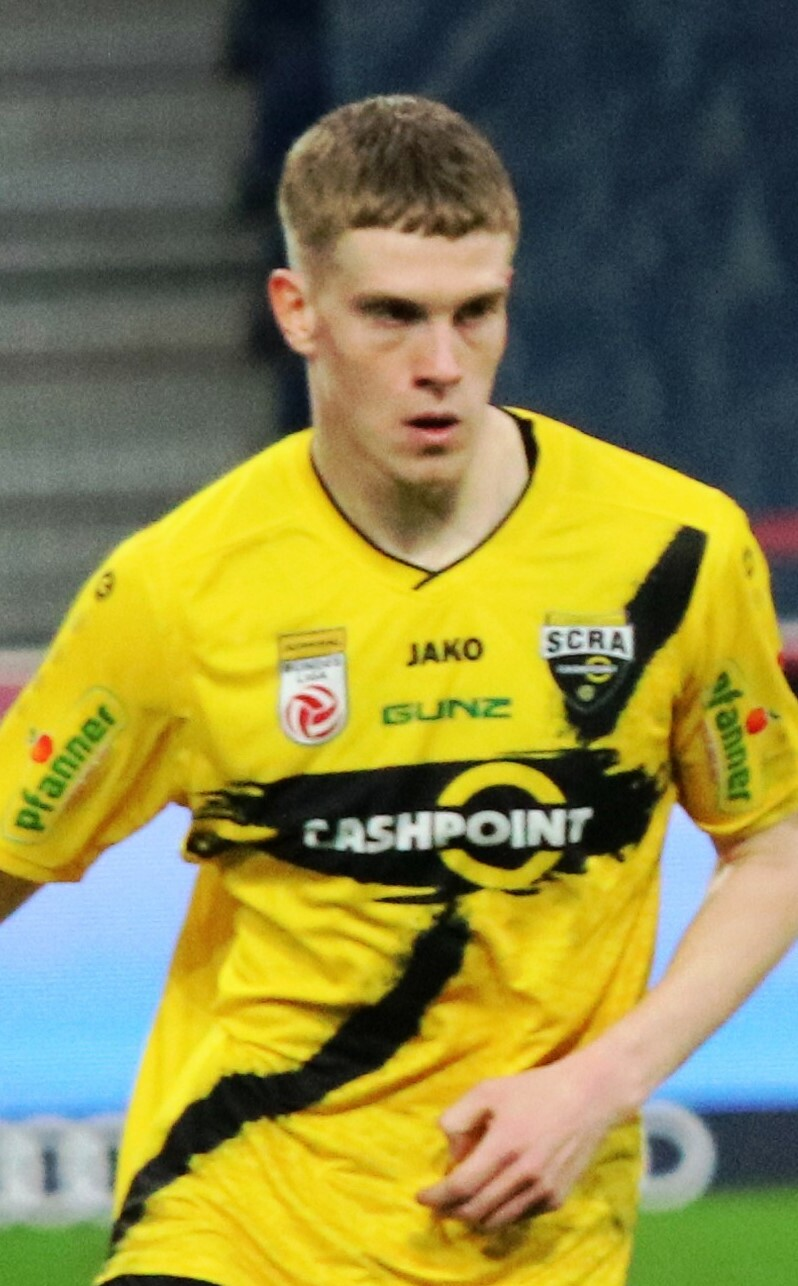
- Herold with Rheindorf Altach in 2023

Personal information
- Date of birth: 20 February 2003 (age 23)
- Place of birth: Mindelheim, Germany
- Height: 1.85 m (6 ft 1 in)
- Position: Left-back

Team information
- Current team: Borussia Mönchengladbach
- Number: 20

Youth career
- JFG Region Krumbach
- FC Memmingen
- 2016–2022: Bayern Munich

Senior career*
Years	Team	Apps	(Gls)
2022–2024	Bayern Munich II	31	(1)
2023	→ Rheindorf Altach (loan)	15	(0)
2023–2024	→ Karlsruher SC (loan)	23	(1)
2024–2026	Karlsruher SC	66	(0)
2026–	Borussia Mönchengladbach	4	(0)

International career^{‡}
2018–2019	Germany U16	5	(0)
2019	Germany U17	3	(1)
2020	Germany U18	2	(0)
2021	Germany U19	4	(0)
2024	Germany U20	2	(0)
- * Club domestic league appearances and goals as of 23 October 2026 ‡ National team caps and goals as of 19:00, 1 April 2024 (UTC)

David Herold (born 20 February 2003) is a German professional footballer who plays as a left-back for Bundesliga club Borussia Mönchengladbach. He has represented Germany at various youth levels internationally.

== Club career ==
=== Early career ===
Herold is a youth product of JFG Region Krumbach, FC Memmingen and Bayern Munich.

=== Bayern Munich ===
He began his senior career with Bayern Munich II in 2022. On 1 June 2022, he extended his contract with Bayern Munich II until 2024. He joined the senior Bayern Munich team in the preseason tour in the summer of 2022.

==== Loan to Rheindorf Altach ====
On 6 February 2023, Herold joined the Austrian club Rheindorf Altach on loan for the second half of the 2022–23 season. He made his senior and professional debut with Rheindorf Altach as a substitute in a 1–0 loss Austrian Bundesliga match against LASK on 12 February 2023.

==== Loan to Karlsruher SC ====
On 29 June 2023, Herold joined 2. Bundesliga club Karlsruher SC on a season-long loan with an option to make the move permanent.

=== Karlsruher SC ===
He was permanently transferred to Karlsruher SC on 14 June 2024.

=== Borussia Mönchengladbach ===
On 20 May 2026, Herold signed with Bundesliga club Borussia Mönchengladbach on a 4-year contract, set to join on 1 July, ahead of the 2026–27 season.

== International career ==
Herold is a youth international for Germany, having played up to the Germany U19s.

== Career statistics ==
As of match played 23 October 2026

Appearances and goals by club, season and competition
Club	Season	League			Cup (Note: Includes DFB-Pokal)		Total	
Club	Season	Division	Apps	Goals	Apps	Goals	Apps	Goals
Bayern Munich	2021–22	Regionalliga Bayern	13	1	—		13	1
Bayern Munich	2022–23	Regionalliga Bayern	18	0	—		18	0
Bayern Munich	Total		31	1	—		31	1
Rheindorf Altach (loan)	2022–23	Austrian Bundesliga	15	0	—		15	0
Karlsruher SC (loan)	2023–24	2. Bundesliga	23	1	1	0	24	1
Karlsruher SC	2024–25	2. Bundesliga	33	0	3	1	36	1
Karlsruher SC	2025–26	2. Bundesliga	33	2	2	0	35	2
Karlsruher SC	Total		66	2	5	1	71	3
Borussia Mönchengladbach	2026–27	Bundesliga	4	0	1	0	5	0
Career Total			131	5	7	1	138	6
