= Dženis Burnić =

Bosnian footballer (born 1998)

- Burnić playing for Dynamo Dresden in 2019

Personal information
- Date of birth: 22 May 1998 (age 28)
- Place of birth: Hamm, Germany
- Height: 1.81 m (5 ft 11 in)
- Position: Midfielder

Team information
- Current team: Volos
- Number: 27

Youth career
- SV 26 Heessen
- 2006–2016: Borussia Dortmund

Senior career*
Years	Team	Apps	(Gls)
2016–2020	Borussia Dortmund	1	(0)
2018–2019	Borussia Dortmund II	11	(0)
2017–2018	→ VfB Stuttgart (loan)	6	(0)
2019–2020	→ Dynamo Dresden (loan)	34	(1)
2020–2023	1. FC Heidenheim	60	(0)
2023–2026	Karlsruher SC	93	(5)
2026–	Volos	5	(0)

International career^{‡}
2012–2013	Germany U15	3	(0)
2013–2014	Germany U16	9	(1)
2014–2015	Germany U17	15	(0)
2016	Germany U18	1	(0)
2016	Germany U19	5	(0)
2017–2019	Germany U20	10	(1)
2019	Germany U21	4	(0)
2024–	Bosnia and Herzegovina	22	(0)
- * Club domestic league appearances and goals as of 2 November 2026 ‡ National team caps and goals as of 24 June 2026

Dženis Burnić (pronounced [dʒêːnis bǔrnitɕ]; born 22 May 1998) is a professional footballer who plays as a midfielder for Super League Greece club Volos. Born in Germany, he plays for the Bosnia and Herzegovina national team.

Burnić started his professional career at Borussia Dortmund, playing mainly in its reserve team, before being loaned to VfB Stuttgart in 2017 and to Dynamo Dresden in 2019. The following year, he joined 1. FC Heidenheim. In 2023, he moved to Karlsruher SC. Three years later, he signed with Volos.

A former German youth international, Burnić made his senior international debut for Bosnia and Herzegovina in 2024, earning over 20 caps since. He represented the nation at the 2026 FIFA World Cup.

== Club career ==
=== Borussia Dortmund ===
Burnić started playing football at a local club, before joining Borussia Dortmund's youth academy in 2006. In April 2015, he signed his first professional contract with the team. He made his professional debut in a UEFA Champions League game against Sporting CP on 18 October 2016 at the age of 18. Four months later, he made his league debut against SV Darmstadt.

In July, Burnić was sent on a season-long loan to VfB Stuttgart.

In January 2019, he was loaned to Dynamo Dresden for the remainder of the campaign. In July, his loan was extended for an additional season. On 3 May, he scored his first professional goal against FC St. Pauli, which secured the victory for his squad.

=== 1. FC Heidenheim ===
In August 2020, Burnić moved to 1. FC Heidenheim on a three-year deal. On 21 November, he made his official debut for the side against Holstein Kiel. He won his first title with 1. FC Heidenheim, club's first trophy ever, on 28 May 2023, when they were crowned league champions, which earned them promotion to the Bundesliga.

=== Karlsruher SC ===
In July, Burnić switched to Karlsruher SC on a one-year contract. He made his competitive debut for the squad on 29 July against VfL Osnabrück and managed to score a goal, ensuring the triumph for his team.

In April 2024, he signed a new multi-year deal with Karlsruher SC.

=== Later stage of career ===
In September 2026, Burnić joined Greek side Volos.

== International career ==
Despite representing Germany at all youth levels, Burnić decided to play for Bosnia and Herzegovina at the senior level.

In May 2024, his request to change sports citizenship from German to Bosnian was approved by FIFA. Later that month, he received his first senior call up, for friendly games against England and Italy. He debuted against the former on 3 June.

In June 2026, Burnić was named in Bosnia and Herzegovina's squad for the 2026 FIFA World Cup. He made his tournament debut in the opening group match against Canada on 12 June.

== Personal life ==
Burnić married his long-time girlfriend Danijela in June 2023. Together they have a son.

He is a practising Muslim; together with international teammates Amar Dedić, Ermedin Demirović and Tarik Muharemović he visited a mosque in Sarajevo during the national team's concentration.

== Career statistics ==
=== Club ===
As of match played 2 November 2026

Appearances and goals by club, season and competition
Club	Season	League			National cup (Note: Includes DFB-Pokal, Greek Cup)		Continental		Total	
Club	Season	Division	Apps	Goals	Apps	Goals	Apps	Goals	Apps	Goals
Borussia Dortmund	2016–17	Bundesliga	1	0	0	0	1 (Note: Appearance in UEFA Champions League)	0	2	0
VfB Stuttgart (loan)	2017–18	Bundesliga	6	0	2	0	–		8	0
Borussia Dortmund II	2018–19	Regionalliga West	11	0	–		–		11	0
Dynamo Dresden (loan)	2018–19	2. Bundesliga	12	1	–		–		12	1
Dynamo Dresden (loan)	2019–20	2. Bundesliga	22	0	1	1	–		23	1
Dynamo Dresden (loan)	Total		34	1	1	1	–		35	2
1. FC Heidenheim	2020–21	2. Bundesliga	12	0	0	0	–		12	0
1. FC Heidenheim	2021–22	2. Bundesliga	28	0	1	0	–		29	0
1. FC Heidenheim	2022–23	2. Bundesliga	20	0	1	0	–		21	0
1. FC Heidenheim	Total		60	0	2	0	–		62	0
Karlsruher SC	2023–24	2. Bundesliga	30	2	0	0	–		30	2
Karlsruher SC	2024–25	2. Bundesliga	31	2	3	0	–		34	2
Karlsruher SC	2025–26	2. Bundesliga	32	1	1	0	–		33	1
Karlsruher SC	Total		93	5	4	0	–		97	5
Volos	2026–27	Super League Greece	5	0	1	0	–		6	0
Career total			210	6	10	1	1	0	221	7

=== International ===
As of match played 24 June 2026

Appearances and goals by national team and year
National team	Year	Apps	Goals
Bosnia and Herzegovina
Bosnia and Herzegovina	2024	8	0
Bosnia and Herzegovina	2025	8	0
Bosnia and Herzegovina	2026	6	0
Total		22	0

== Honours ==
1. FC Heidenheim

- 2. Bundesliga: 2022–23
