= Bambasé Conté =

German footballer (born 2003)

Personal information
- Date of birth: 7 July 2003 (age 23)
- Place of birth: Saarbrücken, Germany
- Height: 1.78 m (5 ft 10 in)
- Positions: Attacking midfielder; winger

Team information
- Current team: TSG Hoffenheim
- Number: 20

Youth career
- 2009–2016: 1. FC Saarbrücken
- 2016–2018: 1. FC Kaiserslautern
- 2018–2022: TSG Hoffenheim

Senior career*
Years	Team	Apps	(Gls)
2022–	TSG Hoffenheim II	23	(6)
2023–	TSG Hoffenheim	14	(2)
2024–2025	→ Karlsruher SC (loan)	26	(1)
2025–2026	→ SV Elversberg (loan)	25	(4)

International career^{‡}
2018	Germany U16	2	(0)
2022	Germany U20	2	(0)
2026–	Germany	3	(0)
- * Club domestic league appearances and goals as of 25 October 2026 ‡ National team caps and goals as of 23:45, 4 October 2026 (UTC)

Bambasé Conté (born 7 July 2003) is a German professional footballer who plays as an attacking midfielder or a winger for Bundesliga club TSG Hoffenheim and the Germany national team.

== Club career ==
Conté is a product of the youth academies of 1. FC Saarbrücken, 1. FC Kaiserslautern and TSG Hoffenheim. He was promoted to their reserves in 2022, and made his first appearance on the bench in the Bundesliga that same year. In June 2023, he started training with the senior team and was promoted to the squad. On 4 November 2023, he made his senior debut with Leverkusen in a 3–2 Bundesliga loss to Bayer Leverkusen on 4 November 2023.

On 3 July 2024, Conté moved on loan to Karlsruher SC in the 2. Bundesliga.

On 18 June 2025, he joined SV Elversberg in the 2. Bundesliga on loan.

== International career ==
Born in Saarbrücken, Germany, Conté is of Guinean and German descent. He is a youth international for Germany, having played up to the U20s.

In September 2026, Conté was one of players who were called up with the Germany national team by head coach Jürgen Klopp for the 2026–27 UEFA Nations League matches against Netherlands, Greece, Serbia and Greece between 24 September and 4 October 2026.

== Career statistics ==
=== Club ===
As of match played 28 October 2026

Appearances and goals by club, season and competition
Club	Season	League			National cup		Europe		Other		Total	
Club	Season	Division	Apps	Goals	Apps	Goals	Apps	Goals	Apps	Goals	Apps	Goals
TSG Hoffenheim II	2021–22	Regionalliga Südwest	1	0	—		—		—		1	0
TSG Hoffenheim II	2022–23	Regionalliga Südwest	15	4	—		—		—		15	4
TSG Hoffenheim II	2023–24	Regionalliga Südwest	2	1	—		—		—		2	1
TSG Hoffenheim II	Total		18	5	—		—		—		18	5
TSG Hoffenheim	2023–24	Bundesliga	7	0	1	0	—		—		8	0
TSG Hoffenheim	2026–27	Bundesliga	7	2	2	0	3 (Note: Appearances in UEFA Europa League)	0	—		12	2
TSG Hoffenheim	Total		14	2	3	0	3	0	—		20	2
Karlsruher SC (loan)	2024–25	2. Bundesliga	26	1	3	1	—		—		29	2
SV Elversberg (loan)	2025–26	2. Bundesliga	25	4	2	0	—		—		27	4
Career total			83	12	8	1	3	0	0	0	94	13

=== International ===
As of match played 4 October 2026

Appearances and goals by national team and year
National team	Year	Apps	Goals
Germany	2026	3	0
Total		3	0
