= Lukas Frenkert =

German footballer (born 2000)

Personal information
- Date of birth: 19 July 2000 (age 26)
- Place of birth: Münster, Germany
- Height: 1.90 m (6 ft 3 in)
- Position: Defender

Team information
- Current team: Eintracht Braunschweig
- Number: 29

Youth career
- Arminia Ochtrup
- FC Twente
- –2014: Eintracht Rheine
- 2014–2020: Preußen Münster

Senior career*
Years	Team	Apps	(Gls)
2020–2021	Preußen Münster	25	(3)
2021–2022	Schalke 04 II	15	(0)
2022–2025	Preußen Münster	40	(3)
2023–2024	→ 1. FC Bocholt (loan)	29	(0)
2025–	Eintracht Braunschweig	18	(3)
- * Club domestic league appearances and goals as of 18 May 2026

Lukas Frenkert (born 19 July 2000) is a German professional footballer who plays as a defender for 2. Bundesliga club Eintracht Braunschweig.

== Early life ==
Frenkert was born in Münster, but grew up in Ochtrup. He attended Städtischen Gymnasium Ochtrup.

== Career ==
Frenkert played as a striker for Arminia Ochtrup's academy before moving to FC Twente at under-13 level. After a spell with Eintracht Rheine's academy, he moved to Preußen Münster's academy in 2014. He joined Münster's first team for the 2020–21 season, and scored 3 in 25 matches in the Regionalliga West. In March 2021, it was announced that Frenkert would transfer to Schalke 04 II in summer 2021 at the end of his contract with Münster. He returned to Preußen Münster in January 2022, and explained to Reviersport interviewer Krystian Wozniak that he chose to leave Schalke as he was unhappy there.

In August 2023, Frenkert joined 1. FC Bocholt on a season-long loan. He made 29 Regionalliga West appearances for the club across the 2023–24 season. Upon his return to Münster, who were now in the 2. Bundesliga, he established himself as a regular first team player in the 2024–25 season, starting every league match for the club prior to the winter break and making 25 league appearances in total.

On 8 June 2025, Frenkert signed a two-season contract with Eintracht Braunschweig.

== Style of play ==
Frenkert was described as an all-rounder early in his career; he played as a striker for Arminia Ochtrup's academy but by the 2018–19 season, he was playing as a right midfielder in the Under 19 Bundesliga. When he came into the first team at Preußen Münster, he was playing primarily as a right back, and later became a central defender during the 2024–25 season.

== Career statistics ==
As of match played 7 March 2026

Appearances and goals by club, season and competition
Club	Season	League			DFB-Pokal		Other		Total	
Club	Season	Division	Apps	Goals	Apps	Goals	Apps	Goals	Apps	Goals
Preußen Münster	2020–21	Regionalliga West	25	3	—		0	0	25	3
Schalke 04 II	2021–22	Regionalliga West	15	0	—		0	0	15	0
Preußen Münster	2021–22	Regionalliga West	6	0	—		0	0	6	0
Preußen Münster	2022–23	Regionalliga West	9	0	—		0	0	9	0
Preußen Münster	2023–24	3. Liga	0	0	0	0	0	0	0	0
Preußen Münster	2024–25	2. Bundesliga	25	3	1	0	0	0	26	3
Preußen Münster	Total		40	3	1	0	0	0	41	3
1. FC Bocholt (loan)	2023–24	Regionalliga West	29	0	—		0	0	29	0
Eintracht Braunschweig	2025–26	2. Bundesliga	16	3	1	0	0	0	17	3
Career total			125	3	2	0	0	0	127	3
