= Torge Paetow =

German footballer

Personal information
- Date of birth: 14 August 1995 (age 31)
- Place of birth: Germany
- Height: 1.88 m (6 ft 2 in)
- Position: Centre-back

Team information
- Current team: SC Preußen Münster
- Number: 16

Youth career
- TSV Hattstedt
- –2011: FC Angeln 02
- 2011–2014: Holstein Kiel

Senior career*
Years	Team	Apps	(Gls)
2014–2016	ETSV Weiche	61	(1)
2016–2017	VfR Aalen	9	(0)
2017–2022	Weiche Flensburg 08	122	(14)
2022–2024	SC Verl	68	(4)
2024–	SC Preußen Münster	31	(3)
- * Club domestic league appearances and goals as of 18 May 2026

Torge Paetow (born 14 August 1995) is a German footballer who plays as a centre-back for 3. Liga club SC Preußen Münster.

== Club career ==
On 19 June 2024, Paetow signed with SC Preußen Münster, recently promoted to 2. Bundesliga.
