= Marvin Wanitzek =

German footballer

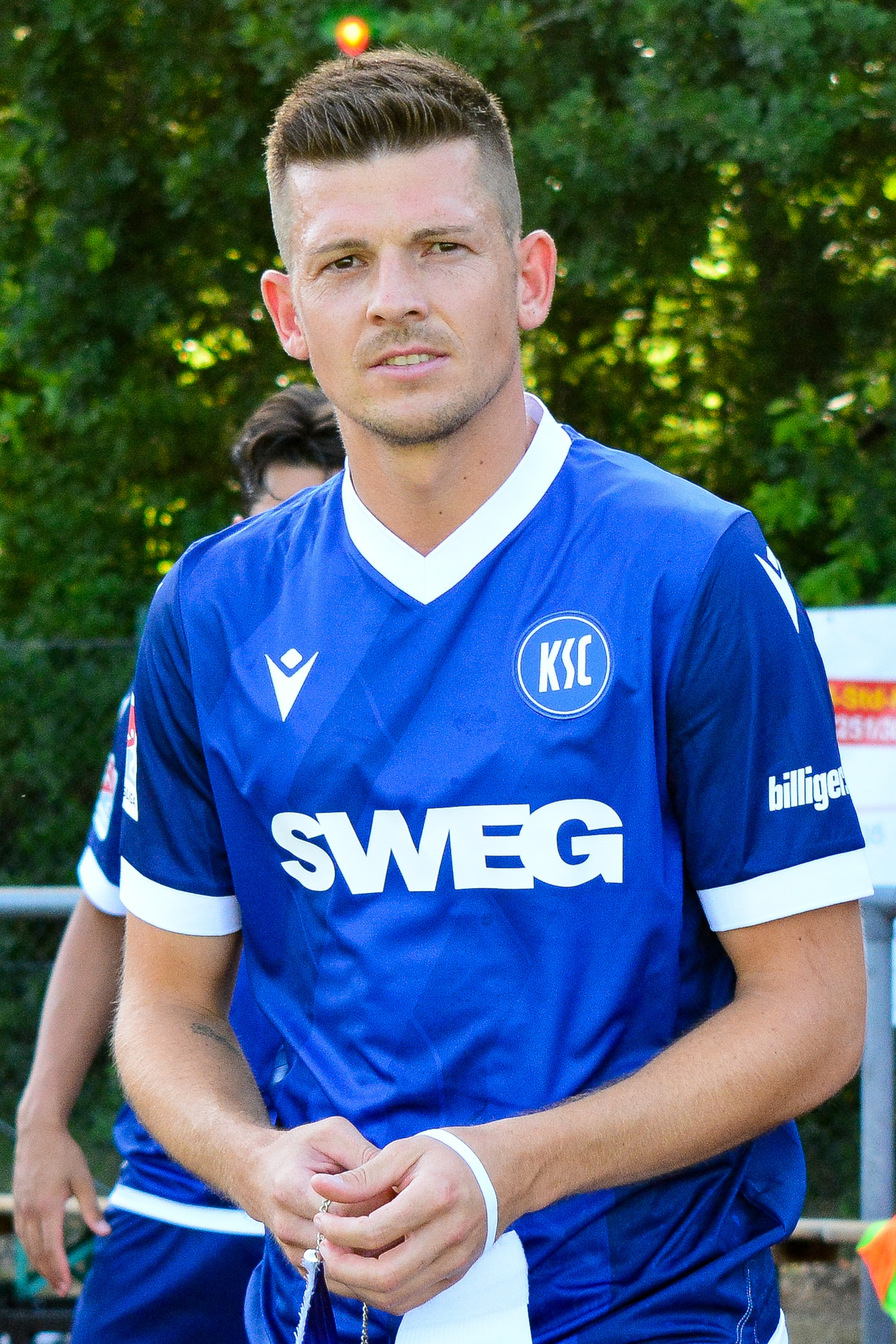
- Wanitzek in 2025

Personal information
- Date of birth: 7 May 1993 (age 33)
- Place of birth: Bruchsal, Germany
- Height: 1.79 m (5 ft 10 in)
- Position: Attacking midfielder

Team information
- Current team: Karlsruher SC
- Number: 10

Youth career
- FV Ubstadt
- –2010: TSG Hoffenheim
- 2010–2012: FC Astoria Walldorf

Senior career*
| Years | Team | Apps | (Gls) |
| 2012–2013 | FC Astoria Walldorf | 28 | (7) |
| 2013–2017 | VfB Stuttgart II | 96 | (15) |
| 2015–2017 | VfB Stuttgart | 1 | (0) |
| 2017– | Karlsruher SC | 307 | (77) |
- * Club domestic league appearances and goals as of 18 May 2026

Marvin Wanitzek (born 7 May 1993) is a German professional footballer who plays for 2. Bundesliga side Karlsruher SC as an attacking midfielder.

== Career ==
Wanitzek joined VfB Stuttgart in July 2013 from FC Astoria Walldorf. On 28 October 2015, he made his debut for the first team in the 2015–16 DFB-Pokal against Carl Zeiss Jena. He had his first Bundesliga appearance with Stuttgart on 29 November 2015 against Borussia Dortmund.

In June 2017, he signed for 3. Liga club Karlsruher SC on a three-year deal until 2020. In 2018–19 season, he promoted with Karlsruher SC to the 2. Bundesliga. In January 2020, he agreed a contract extension until summer 2024.

== Personal life ==
Born in Germany, Wanitzek is of Polish descent.

== Career statistics ==
As of matches played on 5 December 2023

Appearances and goals by club, season and competition
| Club | Season | League | | | Cup | | Total | | Other | | Ref. |
| Club | Season | League | Apps | Goals | Apps | Goals | Apps | Goals | Apps | Goals | Ref. |
|---|---|---|---|---|---|---|---|---|---|---|---|
| Astoria Walldorf | 2012–13 | Verbandsliga Baden | 28 | 7 | — | | — | | 28 | 7 | |
| VfB Stuttgart II | 2013–14 | 3. Liga | 34 | 3 | — | | — | | 34 | 3 | |
| VfB Stuttgart II | 2014–15 | 3. Liga | 29 | 5 | — | | — | | 29 | 5 | |
| VfB Stuttgart II | 2015–16 | 3. Liga | 17 | 3 | — | | — | | 17 | 3 | |
| VfB Stuttgart II | 2016–17 | Regionalliga Südwest | 15 | 4 | — | | — | | 15 | 4 | |
| VfB Stuttgart II | Total | | 95 | 15 | 0 | 0 | 0 | 0 | 95 | 15 | — |
| VfB Stuttgart | 2015–16 | Bundesliga | 1 | 0 | 1 | 0 | – | | 2 | 0 | |
| Karlsruher SC | 2017–18 | 3. Liga | 37 | 3 | 1 | 0 | 2 | 0 | 40 | 3 | |
| Karlsruher SC | 2018–19 | 3. Liga | 37 | 6 | 1 | 0 | – | | 38 | 6 | |
| Karlsruher SC | 2019–20 | 2. Bundesliga | 34 | 5 | 3 | 1 | 0 | 0 | 37 | 6 | |
| Karlsruher SC | 2020–21 | 2. Bundesliga | 33 | 6 | 1 | 0 | 0 | 0 | 34 | 6 | |
| Karlsruher SC | 2021–22 | 2. Bundesliga | 32 | 9 | 4 | 1 | 0 | 0 | 36 | 10 | |
| Karlsruher SC | 2022–23 | 2. Bundesliga | 34 | 10 | 2 | 1 | 0 | 0 | 36 | 11 | |
| Karlsruher SC | 2023–24 | 2. Bundesliga | 15 | 4 | 1 | 0 | 0 | 0 | 16 | 4 | |
| Karlsruher SC | Total | | 222 | 43 | 13 | 3 | 2 | 0 | 237 | 46 | — |
| Career total | | | 346 | 65 | 14 | 3 | 2 | 0 | 362 | 68 | — |
