= Robin Heußer =

German footballer (born 1998)

Personal information
- Date of birth: 23 May 1998 (age 28)
- Place of birth: Aschaffenburg, Germany
- Height: 1.70 m (5 ft 7 in)
- Position: Midfielder

Team information
- Current team: Eintracht Braunschweig
- Number: 30

Youth career
- DJK Hain
- –2013: Viktoria Aschaffenburg
- 2013–2017: 1. FC Nürnberg

Senior career*
Years	Team	Apps	(Gls)
2017–2020	1. FC Nürnberg II	67	(3)
2020–2022	SSV Ulm	74	(6)
2022–2024	Wehen Wiesbaden	66	(2)
2024–2025	Karlsruher SC	28	(1)
2025–	Eintracht Braunschweig	30	(2)
- * Club domestic league appearances and goals as of 18 May 2026

Robin Heußer (born 23 May 1998) is a German professional footballer who plays as a midfielder for 2. Bundesliga club Eintracht Braunschweig.

== Career ==
Born in Aschaffenburg, Heußer grew up in Laufach. He played youth football for DJK Hain, Viktoria Aschaffenburg and 1. FC Nürnberg before starting his senior career with Nürnberg's reserve team, making his debut in a 2–1 Regionalliga Südwest defeat to Bayern Munich II on 18 May 2017. After 67 appearances and 3 goals for Nürnberg II, Heußer signed for SSV Ulm on a two-year contract in June 2020.

On 8 June 2022, Heußer signed for Wehen Wiesbaden of the 3. Liga on a two-year contract. He was part of the Wiesbaden team that won promotion to the 2. Bundesliga, defeating Arminia Bielefeld 5–1 over two legs, with Heußer providing an assist in the second leg.

On 10 June 2024, Heußer joined 2. Bundesliga side Karlsruher SC.

On 21 July 2025, Heußer moved to Eintracht Braunschweig on a two-season contract.
