= Marc Lorenz =

German footballer

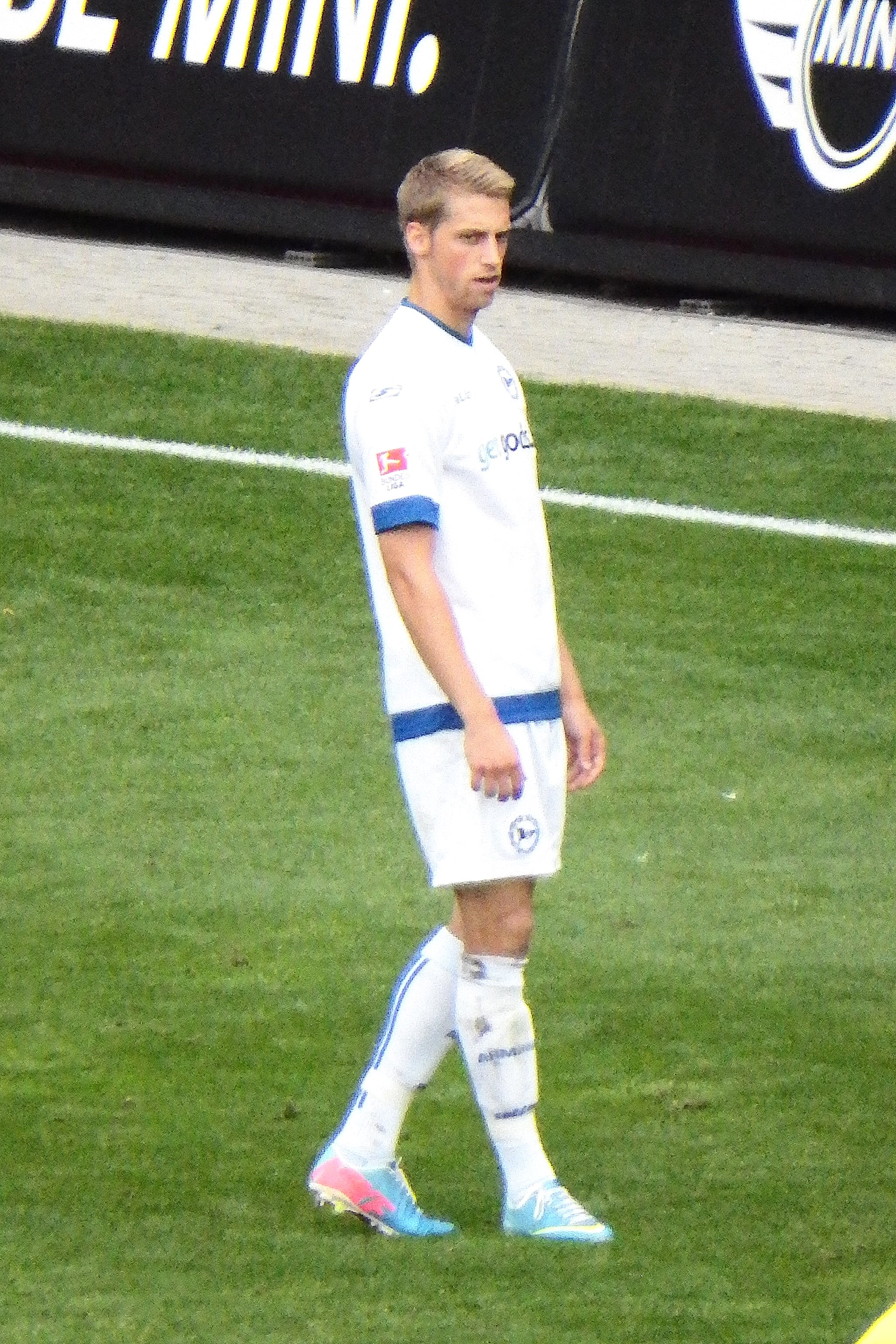
- Lorenz with Arminia Bielefeld in 2013

Personal information
- Date of birth: 18 July 1988 (age 38)
- Place of birth: Münster, West Germany
- Height: 1.82 m (6 ft 0 in)
- Position: Midfielder

Team information
- Current team: FC Nöttingen (assistant coach)

Youth career
- BSV Roxel
- 1. FC Gievenbeck
- –2006: Preußen Münster
- 2006–2007: Schalke 04

Senior career*
Years	Team	Apps	(Gls)
2007–2009	Schalke 04 II	58	(11)
2009–2011	Preußen Münster	50	(3)
2011–2012	Sportfreunde Lotte	33	(7)
2012–2015	Arminia Bielefeld	55	(4)
2014	Arminia Bielefeld II	1	(0)
2015–2017	Wehen Wiesbaden	70	(4)
2017–2022	Karlsruher SC	138	(7)
2018	Karlsruher SC II	1	(0)
2022–2025	Preußen Münster	92	(14)
Total		526	(50)
- * Club domestic league appearances and goals

Marc Lorenz (born 18 July 1988) is a German professional footballer who plays as a midfielder.

Lorenz began his senior career with Schalke 04 II, before moving to Regionalliga West club SC Preußen Münster in 2009, where he won promotion to the 3. Liga in 2011. He then spent the 2011–12 season with Sportfreunde Lotte, also in the Regionalliga West, before signing for 3. Liga club Arminia Bielefeld in summer 2012. In his three seasons at the club, they were promoted to the 2. Bundesliga, relegated back to the 3. Liga and promoted to the 2. Bundesliga again. He remained in the 3. Liga, playing with Wehen Wiesbaden between 2015 and 2017, before joining Karlsruher SC. He spent five years at the club, earning promotion to the 2. Bundesliga in his second season there. In summer 2022, he returned to Preußen Münster in the Regionalliga West. He was club captain as they earned back-to-back promotions to the 2. Bundesliga in his first two seasons with the club. His contract was terminated by the club in August 2025 amidst alleged irregularities in his handling of charitable donations.

== Career ==
=== Early career ===
Lorenz began his youth career with BSV Roxel and after a spell with 1. FC Gievenbeck, he joined Preußen Münster. In 2006, Lorenz moved to FC Schalke 04 and joined their under-19 team, who finished as runners-up in the U-19-Bundesliga West in 2006–07. Lorenz then was promoted to Schlake's reserve team with who in 2008 he won promotion to the Regionalliga West. He scored 5 goals in 28 Regionalliga appearances during the 2008–09 season.

Lorenz returned to Preußen Münster in summer 2009. and made 50 Regionalliga West appearances over two seasons, in which he scored three goals. He won the Regionalliga West with the club, and hence promotion to the 3. Liga, with the club in the 2010–11, but was released by the club at the end of the season.

In June 2011, Lorenz transferred to Sportfreunden Lotte of the Regionalliga West. He scored 7 goals in 33 matches across the 2011–12 season as the club finished as runners-up.

=== Arminia Bielefeld ===
On 10 May 2012, it was announced that Lorenz would join Arminia Bielefeld subject to a medical. He made his professional debut for the club at home to Alemannia Aachen on 20 July 2012. With Arminia, Lorenz won promotion to the 2. Bundesliga in his debut season at the club, though he only made 14 appearances (7 as starts).

Lorenz scored a goal in three consective matches in December 2013, during which Arminia picked up 7 points, having gone seven matches without winning a point prior. The first of these goals was nominated for the Sportschau Goal of the Month award for December 2013. In December 2013, he also agreed a contract extension to 2016. In total, he made 25 2. Bundesliga appearances and scored three goals during the 2013–14 season, though Bielefeld were relegated back to the 3. Liga via the relegation playoff. He scored once in 16 appearances during the 2014–15 3. Liga as Bielefeld were promoted back to the 2. Bundesliga as champions of the 3. Liga.

=== Wehen Wiesbaden ===
In summer 2015, Lorenz transferred to 3. Liga club SV Wehen Wiesbaden on a two-year deal. Across the following two seasons, he played in 70 3. Liga matches, in which he scored four goals.

=== Karlsruher SC ===
On 12 May 2017, with his expiring contract at Wehen Wiesbaden not renewed, he joined Karlsruher SC, newly relegated from the 2. Bundesliga to the 3. Liga, on a two-year contract. He made his first competitive appearance for Karlsruhe in a 2–2 draw with VfL Osnabrück in the opening match of the 2017–18 season on 21 July 2017. He made 28 league appearances during the regular season, as the club qualified for the promotion play-off to the 2. Bundesliga at the end of the season, though they lost to FC Erzgebirge Aue.

Having failed to score in his first season with Karlsruhe, Lorenz netted his first goal for the club in a 3–1 away win against VfR Aalen on 26 September 2018. Lorenz scored four goals and provided six assists in 32 matches as Karlsruhe were promoted to the 2. Bundesliga at the end of the season. He had extended his contract with the club to summer 2021 in April 2019.

He made 29 league appearances, scoring twice in the 2019–20 2. Bundesliga. Karlsruhe avoided relegation back to the 3. Liga in the final match of the season, though Lorenz missed this match due to a yellow card suspension. He subsequently made 28 2. Bundesliga appearances during the 2020–21 season and extended his contract by a further year in April 2021. He made 21 league appearances (also scoring once) during the 2021–22 season.

=== Return to Preußen Münster ===
After his contract at Karlsruhe was not renewed at the end of the 2021–22 season, he returned to Preußen Münster after 11 years away from the club. He became club captain upon his return to the club. He established himself as a set-piece specialist at the club, taking free-kicks, corners and throw-ins. The club achieved back-to-back promotions in his first two seasons back, first to the 3. Liga in the 2022–23 season, followed by promotion to the 2. Bundesliga in the 2023–24 season. On 27 April 2024 he recorded 5 goal contributions in a single match against Viktoria Köln, scoring directly from a corner as well as providing four assists. On 10 June 2025, the club extended his contract for a further year. He scored 14 goals in 94 matches during this spell with the club.

=== Unfair dismissal claim and criminal proceedings ===
On 19 August 2025, Preußen Münster terminated Lorenz's contract with immediate effect, and also filed a criminal complaint, over irregularities in his handling of charitable donations. Lorenz collected donations for the Clinic Clowns at Universitätsklinikum Münster; he claimed that, due to mental health issues, he had failed to settle the accounts for the donations on time, but that the outstanding funds were subsequently cleared. The public prosecutor's office began an investigation into the matter, whilst Lorenz filed an unfair dismissal claim at the Münster labour court over the termination of his contract. A hearing between the club and player was scheduled for 24 September 2025, but later moved to 6 October 2025 at the club's request. At the hearing, the two parties agreed to a revocable settlement, and Lorenz revoked the settlement on 17 October. Lorenz and Preußen Münster reached an out-of-court settlement on 5 March 2026.

In early April 2026, it was revealed that the public prosecutor's office had filed charges against Lorenz for Gewerbsmäßiger Betrug (commercial fraud). He was accused of organising ten fundraising campaigns and collecting money without forwarding the donations as claimed. Lorenz denied the accusations. Authorities claimed that Lorenz intended to keep donations for himself and only transferred portions of the donations after discrepancies were found and investigations had commenced.

=== Subsequent career ===
As Lorenz had not participated in first team training since the end of July 2025, in September 2025 he began training with Oberliga club 1. FC Gievenbeck, where he had played during his youth.

He later became an assistant coach at FC Nöttingen in June 2026.

== Career statistics ==
Appearances and goals by club, season and competition
Club	Season	League			DFB-Pokal		Other		Total	
Club	Season	Division	Apps	Goals	Apps	Goals	Apps	Goals	Apps	Goals
Schalke 04 II	2006–07	Oberliga Westfalen	1	0	—		—		1	0
Schalke 04 II	2007–08	Oberliga Westfalen	29	6	—		—		29	6
Schalke 04 II	2008–09	Regionalliga West	28	5	—		—		28	5
Schalke 04 II	Total		58	11	0	0	0	0	58	11
Preußen Münster	2009–10	Regionalliga West	28	3	1	1	—		29	4
Preußen Münster	2010–11	Regionalliga West	22	0	1	0	—		23	0
Preußen Münster	Total		78	8	2	1	0	0	80	9
Sportfreunde Lotte	2011–12	Regionalliga West	33	7	—		—		33	7
Arminia Bielefeld	2012–13	3. Liga	14	0	—		—		14	0
Arminia Bielefeld	2013–14	2. Bundesliga	25	3	1	0	—		26	3
Arminia Bielefeld	2014–15	3. Liga	16	1	3	0	—		19	1
Arminia Bielefeld	Total		55	4	4	0	0	0	59	4
Arminia Bielefeld II	2014–15	Oberliga Westfalen	1	0	—		—		1	0
Wehen Wiesbaden	2015–16	3. Liga	36	2	—		—		36	2
Wehen Wiesbaden	2016–17	3. Liga	34	2	—		—		34	2
Wehen Wiesbaden	Total		70	4	0	0	0	0	70	4
Karlsruher SC	2017–18	3. Liga	28	0	1	0	1	0	30	0
Karlsruher SC	2018–19	3. Liga	32	4	—		—		32	4
Karlsruher SC	2019–20	2. Bundesliga	29	2	3	0	—		32	2
Karlsruher SC	2020–21	2. Bundesliga	28	0	1	0	—		29	0
Karlsruher SC	2021–22	2. Bundesliga	21	1	3	0	—		24	1
Karlsruher SC	Total		138	7	8	0	1	0	147	7
Karlsruher SC II	2017–18	Oberliga Baden-Württemberg	1	0	—		—		1	0
Preußen Münster	2022–23	Regionalliga West	32	6	—		—		32	6
Preußen Münster	2023–24	3. Liga	30	4	1	0	—		31	4
Preußen Münster	2024–25	2. Bundesliga	30	4	1	0	—		31	4
Preußen Münster	Total		92	14	2	0	0	0	94	14
Career total			526	50	16	1	1	0	543	51
