= Igor Matanović =

Croatian-German footballer (born 2003)

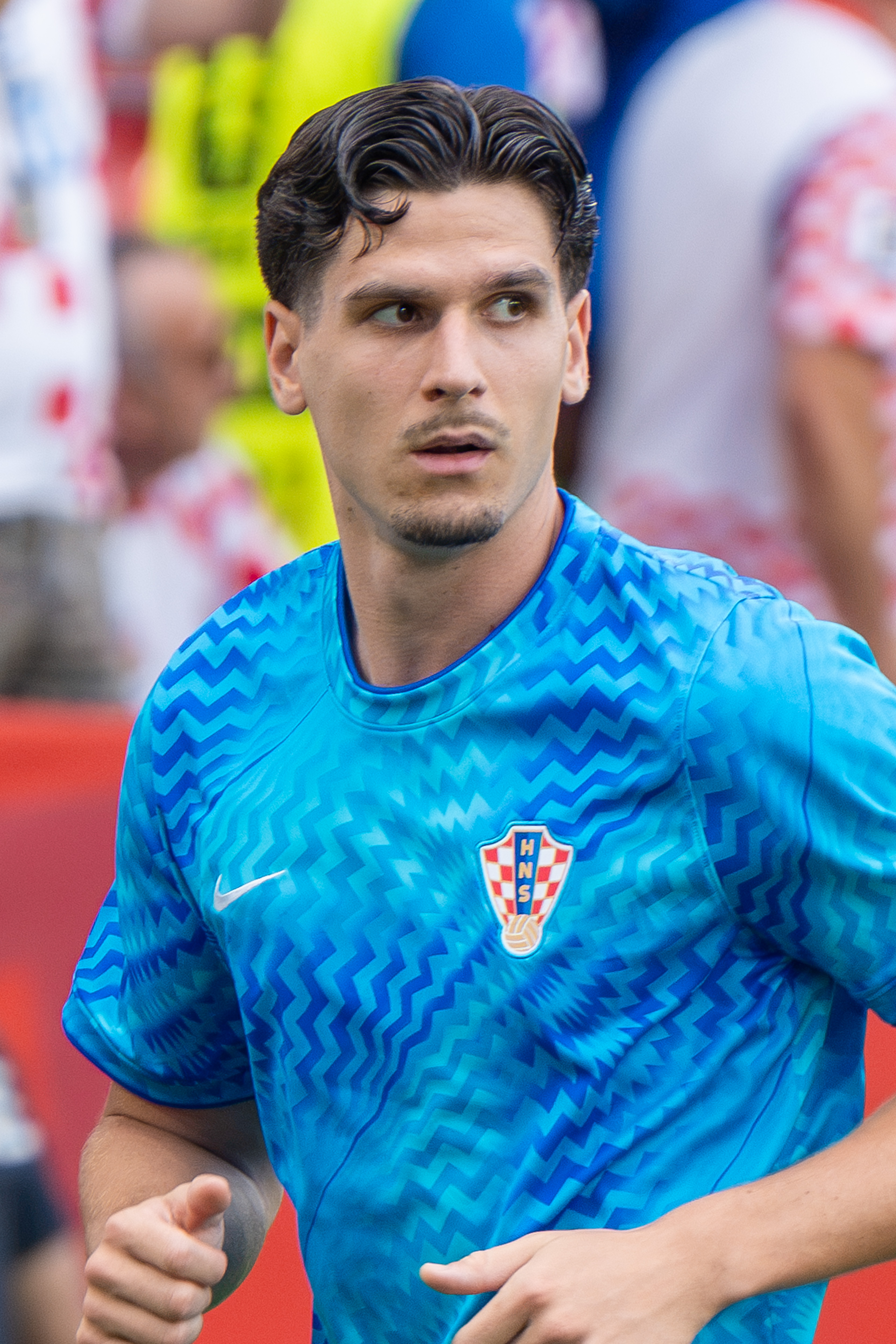
- Matanović with Croatia in 2026

Personal information
- Date of birth: 31 March 2003 (age 23)
- Place of birth: Hamburg, Germany
- Height: 1.95 m (6 ft 5 in)
- Position: Striker

Team information
- Current team: SC Freiburg
- Number: 31

Youth career
- –2010: Harburger TB
- 2010–2021: FC St. Pauli

Senior career*
Years	Team	Apps	(Gls)
2020–2021	FC St. Pauli	17	(1)
2021–2025	Eintracht Frankfurt	16	(1)
2021–2023	→ FC St. Pauli (loan)	36	(2)
2023–2024	→ Karlsruher SC (loan)	32	(16)
2025–	SC Freiburg	39	(15)

International career^{‡}
2017	Croatia U14	3	(0)
2020	Germany U17	3	(2)
2020	Germany U18	2	(2)
2022–2024	Croatia U21	6	(2)
2023–2024	Croatia U23	1	(1)
2024–	Croatia	17	(2)
- * Club domestic league appearances and goals as of 31 October 2026 ‡ National team caps and goals as of 15 November 2026

Igor Matanović (born 31 March 2003) is a professional footballer who plays as a striker for Bundesliga club SC Freiburg. Born in Germany, he plays for the Croatia national team.

== Club career ==
=== FC St. Pauli ===
Matanović played for the youth team of Harburger TB until 2010, when he moved to FC St. Pauli's youth academy. He made his professional debut for St. Pauli's senior team in the 2. Bundesliga on 27 November 2020, coming on as a substitute in the 87th minute for Rico Benatelli against VfL Osnabrück. The home match finished as a 1–0 loss.

=== Eintracht Frankfurt ===
On 30 August 2021, he signed a five-year contract for Eintracht Frankfurt; on the same day he returned to FC St. Pauli on loan.

=== Karlsrusher SC (loan) ===
On 17 August 2023, Matanović moved to Karlsruher SC in 2. Bundesliga on loan.

=== SC Freiburg ===
On 9 July 2025, Matanović joined SC Freiburg.

== International career ==
In April 2022, he declared his intention to represent Croatia internationally at the senior level.

Matanović was called up to the senior Croatia national team for the first time for the Nations League games against Portugal and Poland in September 2024. He debuted on 5 September 2024 against Portugal at Estádio da Luz. He substituted Martin Baturina in the 61st minute, Portugal won 2–1.

On 18 May 2026, Matanović was selected in the 26-man squad for the 2026 FIFA World Cup by head coach Zlatko Dalić. His side was knocked out by Portugal after a 2–1 defeat in Toronto, where an equalizing 103rd-minute stoppage-time goal from Joško Gvardiol was disallowed as offside by VAR. The VAR used cutting-edge snickometer technology to detect Matanović's hair grazing the ball to rule the offiside in a controversial ruling.

== Personal life ==
Matanović's family is from Kotor Varoš, Bosnia and Herzegovina.

== Career statistics ==
=== Club ===
As of match played 31 October 2026

Appearances and goals by club, season and competition
Club	Season	League			DFB-Pokal		Europe		Total	
Club	Season	Division	Apps	Goals	Apps	Goals	Apps	Goals	Apps	Goals
FC St. Pauli	2020–21	2. Bundesliga	17	1	0	0	—		17	1
Eintracht Frankfurt	2021–22	Bundesliga	0	0	0	0	0	0	0	0
Eintracht Frankfurt	2024–25	Bundesliga	16	1	2	1	7 (Note: Appearances in UEFA Europa League)	0	25	2
Eintracht Frankfurt	Total		16	1	2	1	7	0	25	2
FC St. Pauli (loan)	2021–22	2. Bundesliga	18	2	1	0	—		19	2
FC St. Pauli (loan)	2022–23	2. Bundesliga	18	0	2	0	—		20	0
FC St. Pauli (loan)	Total		36	2	3	0	—		39	2
FC St. Pauli II (loan)	2021–22	Regionalliga Nord	2	0	—		—		2	0
FC St. Pauli II (loan)	2022–23	Regionalliga Nord	1	0	—		—		1	0
FC St. Pauli II (loan)	Total		3	0	—		—		3	0
Karlsruher SC (loan)	2023–24	2. Bundesliga	32	14	0	0	—		32	14
SC Freiburg	2025–26	Bundesliga	31	11	4	1	15	3	50	15
SC Freiburg	2026–27	Bundesliga	8	4	2	3	4 (Note: Appearances in UEFA Conference League)	1	13	8
SC Freiburg	Total		39	15	6	4	19	4	64	23
Career total			143	33	11	5	26	4	180	42

=== International ===
As of match played 15 November 2026

Appearances and goals by national team and year
National team	Year	Apps	Goals
Croatia	2024	5	1
Croatia	2025	2	0
Croatia	2026	10	1
Total		17	2

Croatia's score listed first, score column indicates score after each Matanović goal.

List of international goals scored by Igor Matanović
No.	Date	Venue	Opponent	Score	Result	Competition
1	12 October 2024	Stadion Maksimir, Zagreb, Croatia	Scotland	1–1	2–1	2024–25 UEFA Nations League A
2	26 March 2026	Camping World Stadium, Orlando, United States	Colombia	2–1	2–1	Friendly

== Honours ==
SC Freiburg

- UEFA Europa League runner-up: 2025–26
