= Louey Ben Farhat =

German footballer (born 2006)

Personal information
- Date of birth: 19 July 2006 (age 20)
- Place of birth: Waiblingen, Germany
- Height: 1.75 m (5 ft 9 in)
- Position: Forward

Team information
- Current team: Karlsruher SC (on loan from SC Freiburg)
- Number: 19

Youth career
- 2013–2021: FSV Waiblingen
- 2021–2022: Stuttgarter Kickers
- 2022–2024: Karlsruher SC

Senior career*
Years	Team	Apps	(Gls)
2024–2026	Karlsruher SC	33	(9)
2026–	SC Freiburg	0	(0)
2026–	→ Karlsruher SC (loan)	5	(0)

International career^{‡}
2023–2024	Tunisia U20	3	(0)
2026	Tunisia	2	(0)
2026–	Germany U21	2	(0)
- * Club domestic league appearances and goals as of 19 September 2026 ‡ National team caps and goals as of 20:45, 17 November 2026 (UTC)

Louey Ben Farhat (born 19 July 2006) is a German professional footballer who plays as a forward for 2. Bundesliga club Karlsruher SC, on loan from SC Freiburg.

== Club career ==
Ben Farhat is a product of the youth academies of the German clubs FSV Waiblingen, Stuttgarter Kickers, and Karlsruher SC. On 17 March 2024, he made his debut for Karlsruher SC as a substitute in a 7–0 victory over 1. FC Magdeburg in the 2. Bundesliga. On 31 July 2024, he signed his first professional contract with the club. On 28 May 2025, he extended his contract with the club.

On 1 September 2026, Ben Farhat joined Bundesliga club SC Freiburg permanently, and immediately returned to Karlsruher SC on loan for the 2026–27 season.

== International career ==
Born in Germany, Ben Farhat is of Tunisian descent and holds dual German and Tunisian citizenship. He made his debut for the Tunisia U20 team in 2023. He was expected to be called up to the senior Tunisia national team for the 2025 Africa Cup of Nations, but was unable to join the squad as he was recovering from an injury. He made his first appearances for Tunisia in friendly matches against Haiti and Canada in March 2026.

In May 2026, Ben Farhat was omitted from Tunisia's squad for the 2026 FIFA World Cup. According to coach Sabri Lamouchi, he received a call from the player's father requesting that his son not be called up, as it was considered too early for Ben Farhat to be selected. Ben Farhat later explained his decision by citing the consequences of a metatarsal fracture earlier in the season, which had sidelined him for four months. “Against this background and in view of the strain that a World Cup, including its preparation, would entail, I have made this decision at this time.”

In September 2026, he was called up to the Germany under-21 national team for the 2027 European Under-21 Championship qualification matches of the month. He was later called for the friendly match against Croatia U21 on 18 November 2026.
