= Marcel Beifus =

German footballer (born 2002)

Personal information
- Date of birth: 27 October 2002 (age 24)
- Place of birth: Wolfenbüttel, Germany
- Height: 1.87 m (6 ft 2 in)
- Position: Centre-back

Youth career
- MTV Wolfenbüttel
- –2017: VfL Hockenheim
- 2017–2018: VfL Wolfsburg

Senior career*
Years	Team	Apps	(Gls)
2017–2021	VfL Wolfsburg II	7	(1)
2021–2023	FC St. Pauli II	20	(0)
2021–2023	FC St. Pauli	20	(1)
2023–2026	Karlsruher SC	66	(3)

International career^{‡}
2019	Germany U17	2	(0)
2020	Germany U19	2	(0)
2021–2022	Germany U20	2	(0)
2024	Germany U21	2	(0)
- * Club domestic league appearances and goals as of 28 December 2025 ‡ National team caps and goals as of 18:25, 19 November 2024 (UTC)

Marcel Beifus (born 27 October 2002) is a German professional footballer who plays as a centre-back. He has represented Germany internationally at U17 and U19 levels.

== Career ==
Beifus joined 2. Bundesliga club FC St. Pauli from VfL Wolfsburg in summer 2021. On 19 September 2021, he made his debut for FC St. Pauli in the league, coming on as a substitute against FC Ingolstadt.

On 5 June 2023, Beifus signed for fellow 2. Bundesliga club Karlsruher SC on a two-year contract.
