= Kai Eisele =

German footballer

Personal information
- Date of birth: 25 June 1995 (age 31)
- Place of birth: Friesenheim, Germany
- Height: 1.90 m (6 ft 3 in)
- Position: Goalkeeper

Youth career
- FC Ottenheim
- FV Sulz
- –2011: Offenburger FV
- 2011–2014: SC Freiburg

Senior career*
Years	Team	Apps	(Gls)
2014–2017	SC Freiburg II	42	(0)
2017–2018	Hansa Rostock II	4	(0)
2017–2018	Hansa Rostock	3	(0)
2018–2021	Hallescher FC	83	(0)
2021–2022	Fortuna Düsseldorf	0	(0)
2022	Fortuna Düsseldorf II	2	(0)
2022–2024	Karlsruher SC	2	(0)
2024–2025	SpVgg Unterhaching	15	(0)
2025–2026	FC Ingolstadt	27	(0)
- * Club domestic league appearances and goals as of 29 May 2026

Kai Eisele (born 25 June 1995) is a German professional footballer who plays as a goalkeeper.

== Club career ==
On 17 May 2022, it was announced that Eisele had joined Karlsruher SC.

On 31 July 2024, Eisele signed with 3. Liga club SpVgg Unterhaching.

On 12 March 2025, he played his 100th match in the 3rd German Bundesliga.

On 30 June 2025, Eisele signed for 3. Liga club FC Ingolstadt, following relegation with Unterhaching in the 2024–25 season.
