= Patrick Drewes =

German footballer (born 1993)

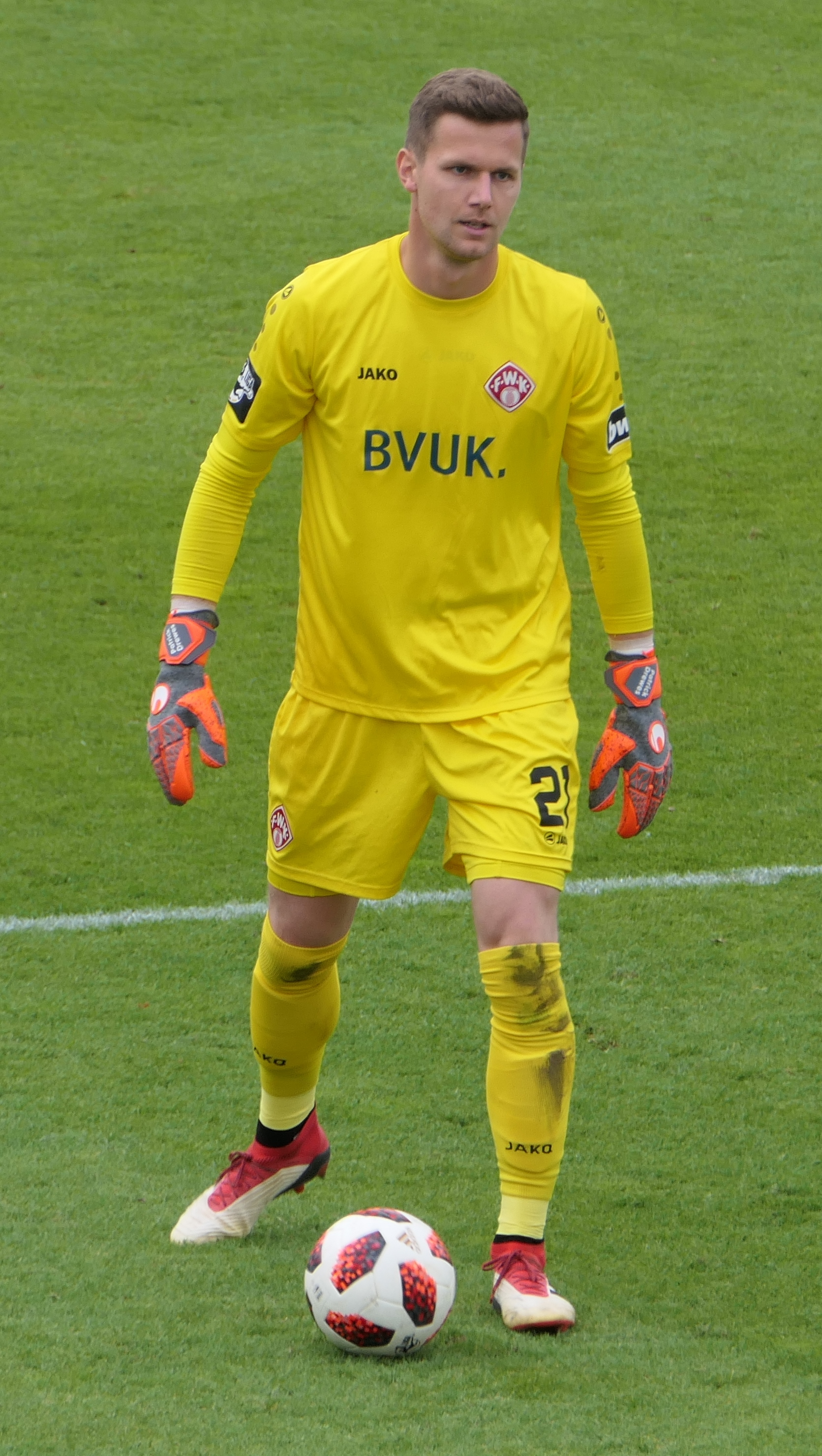
- Drewes with Würzburg in 2018

Personal information
- Date of birth: 4 February 1993 (age 33)
- Place of birth: Delmenhorst, Germany
- Height: 1.94 m (6 ft 4 in)
- Position: Goalkeeper

Team information
- Current team: Borussia Dortmund
- Number: 30

Youth career
- –2008: TuS Heidkrug
- 2008–2012: VfL Wolfsburg

Senior career*
| Years | Team | Apps | (Gls) |
| 2012–2015 | VfL Wolfsburg II | 62 | (0) |
| 2012–2017 | VfL Wolfsburg | 0 | (0) |
| 2015–2016 | → FC Wil (loan) | 32 | (0) |
| 2016–2017 | → Preußen Münster (loan) | 3 | (0) |
| 2017–2019 | Würzburger Kickers | 44 | (0) |
| 2019–2021 | VfL Bochum | 7 | (0) |
| 2021–2023 | SV Sandhausen | 63 | (0) |
| 2023–2024 | Karlsruher SC | 32 | (0) |
| 2024–2025 | VfL Bochum | 21 | (0) |
| 2025– | Borussia Dortmund | 0 | (0) |
- * Club domestic league appearances and goals as of 17 May 2025

Patrick Drewes (born 4 February 1993) is a German professional footballer who plays as a goalkeeper for Bundesliga club Borussia Dortmund.

== Club career ==
Drewes began his career in 1995 at TuS Heidkrug and moved to the youth team of VfL Wolfsburg in 2008. He advanced to the professional team as the third goalkeeper for the 2012–13 Bundesliga season. At the same time, he played for the Wolves' second team to gain experience in the Regionalliga Nord.In the 2013–14 Regionalliga Nord, he won the championship with the second team but failed in the promotion matches to the 3rd division against SG Sonnenhof Großaspach. In the 2014–15 season, he was part of the Wolfsburg squad that won the DFB-Pokal.

At the beginning of the 2015–16 Swiss Challenge League season, Drewes was loaned to the Swiss second-tier club FC Wil for a year. On July 18, 2015, he made his debut in a 2–1 away win against FC Winterthur in the Challenge League. Drewes was a regular starter for Wil and made 32 league appearances that season. His strong performances helped FC Wil improve from a ninth-place finish in the previous season to a third-place finish.

For the 2016–17 3. Liga season, Drewes was loaned to the third-division club Preußen Münster, where he made three appearances. During the 2017–18 3. Liga season, he played on loan for Würzburger Kickers, who later signed him permanently. In the 2018–19 3. Liga season, his last with Würzburg, he was the first-choice goalkeeper but only played 19 games due to injury.

For the 2019–20 2. Bundesliga season, Drewes was signed by the second-division club VfL Bochum as a replacement for former second-choice goalkeeper Felix Dornebusch. In the 2020–21 2. Bundesliga, he made five appearances and helped Bochum win the league title and gain promotion to the Bundesliga. However, for the new season, he remained in the second division and transferred to SV Sandhausen.

For the 2023–24 2. Bundesliga, Drewes moved to Karlsruher SC. For the 2024–25 Bundesliga, Drewes returned to VfL Bochum on a contract until 2026. In Bochum, Drewes quickly became the starting goalkeeper. During a match against 1. FC Union Berlin on December 14, 2024, he was struck by a lighter thrown from the crowd, knocking him out and forcing him off the pitch.

On 26 June 2025, Drewes signed a two-year contract with Borussia Dortmund, joining the club following Bochum's relegation to the 2. Bundesliga. At Dortmund, he was brought in to provide goalkeeping cover for first-choice keeper Gregor Kobel.

== Career statistics ==
As of match played 9 February 2025

Appearances and goals by club, season and competition
| Club | Season | League | | | Cup | | Europe | | Other | | Total | |
| Club | Season | Division | Apps | Goals | Apps | Goals | Apps | Goals | Apps | Goals | Apps | Goals |
|---|---|---|---|---|---|---|---|---|---|---|---|---|
| VfL Wolfsburg II | 2012–13 | Regionalliga Nord | 14 | 0 | — | | — | | — | | 14 | 0 |
| VfL Wolfsburg II | 2013–14 | Regionalliga Nord | 29 | 0 | — | | — | | 2 (Note: Includes appearances in the Regionalliga promotion playoffs.) | 0 | 31 | 0 |
| VfL Wolfsburg II | 2014–15 | Regionalliga Nord | 19 | 0 | — | | — | | — | | 19 | 0 |
| VfL Wolfsburg II | Total | | 62 | 0 | — | | — | | — | | 64 | 0 |
| VfL Wolfsburg | 2012–13 | Bundesliga | 0 | 0 | 0 | 0 | — | | — | | 0 | 0 |
| VfL Wolfsburg | 2013–14 | Bundesliga | 0 | 0 | 0 | 0 | — | | — | | 0 | 0 |
| VfL Wolfsburg | 2014–15 | Bundesliga | 0 | 0 | 0 | 0 | 0 | 0 | — | | 0 | 0 |
| VfL Wolfsburg | Total | | 0 | 0 | 0 | 0 | 0 | 0 | — | | 0 | 0 |
| FC Wil (loan) | 2015–16 | Swiss Challenge League | 32 | 0 | 0 | 0 | — | | — | | 32 | 0 |
| Preußen Münster (loan) | 2016–17 | 3. Liga | 3 | 0 | — | | — | | — | | 3 | 0 |
| Würzburger Kickers | 2017–18 | 3. Liga | 25 | 0 | 0 | 0 | — | | — | | 25 | 0 |
| Würzburger Kickers | 2018–19 | 3. Liga | 19 | 0 | — | | — | | — | | 19 | 0 |
| Würzburger Kickers | Total | | 44 | 0 | 0 | 0 | — | | — | | 44 | 0 |
| VfL Bochum | 2019–20 | 2. Bundesliga | 2 | 0 | 0 | 0 | — | | — | | 2 | 0 |
| VfL Bochum | 2020–21 | 2. Bundesliga | 5 | 0 | 2 | 0 | — | | — | | 7 | 0 |
| VfL Bochum | Total | | 7 | 0 | 2 | 0 | — | | — | | 9 | 0 |
| SV Sandhausen | 2021–22 | 2. Bundesliga | 33 | 0 | 1 | 0 | — | | — | | 34 | 0 |
| SV Sandhausen | 2022–23 | 2. Bundesliga | 30 | 0 | 3 | 0 | — | | — | | 33 | 0 |
| SV Sandhausen | Total | | 63 | 0 | 4 | 0 | — | | — | | 67 | 0 |
| Karlsruher SC | 2023–24 | 2. Bundesliga | 32 | 0 | 1 | 0 | — | | — | | 33 | 0 |
| VfL Bochum | 2024–25 | Bundesliga | 21 | 0 | 1 | 0 | — | | — | | 22 | 0 |
| Borussia Dortmund | 2025–26 | Bundesliga | 0 | 0 | 0 | 0 | — | | — | | 0 | 0 |
| Career total | | | 264 | 0 | 8 | 0 | 0 | 0 | 2 | 0 | 274 | 0 |
