= Marco Thiede =

German footballer

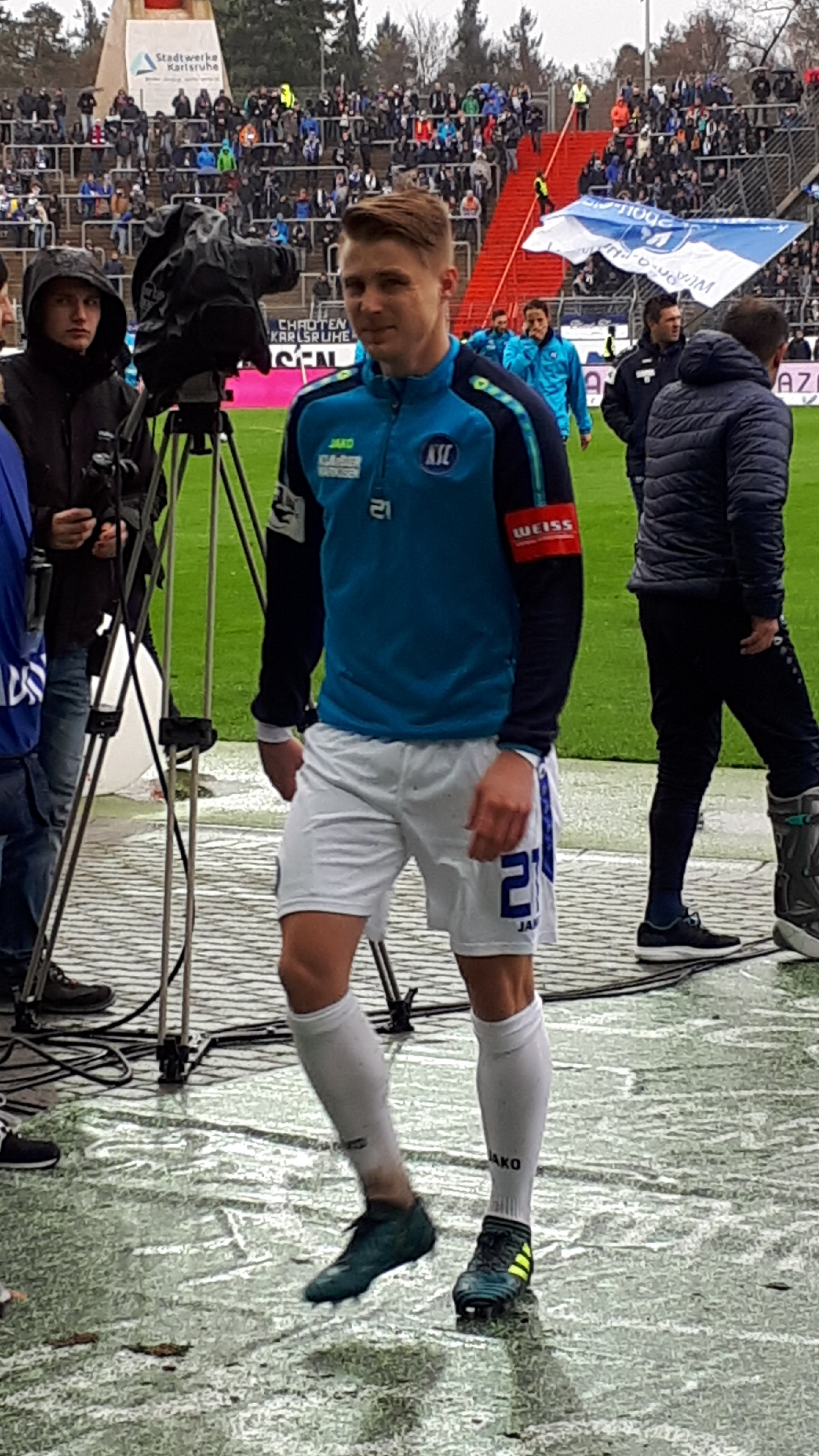
- Thiede with Karlsruher SC in 2018

Personal information
- Date of birth: 20 May 1992 (age 34)
- Place of birth: Augsburg, Germany
- Height: 1.78 m (5 ft 10 in)
- Positions: Right midfielder; right-back

Team information
- Current team: Stal Rzeszów
- Number: 21

Youth career
- 1998–1999: SSV Dillingen
- 1999–2004: FC Gundelfingen
- 2004–2011: FC Augsburg

Senior career*
Years	Team	Apps	(Gls)
2011–2013	FC Augsburg II	58	(23)
2011–2013	FC Augsburg	0	(0)
2013–2017	SV Sandhausen	74	(1)
2017–2024	Karlsruher SC	184	(5)
2024–2025	Darmstadt 98	19	(0)
2025–2026	Anagennisi Karditsa	15	(0)
2026–	Stal Rzeszów	0	(0)
- * Club domestic league appearances and goals as of 01:13, 7 June 2026 (UTC)

Marco Thiede (born 20 May 1992) is a German professional footballer who plays as a right midfielder or a right-back for I liga club Stal Rzeszów.

== Career ==
On 24 September 2024, Thiede signed with Darmstadt 98.

On 6 June 2026, Thiede signed with Polish second tier club Stal Rzeszów on a one-year contract.
