= Christoph Kobald =

Austrian footballer

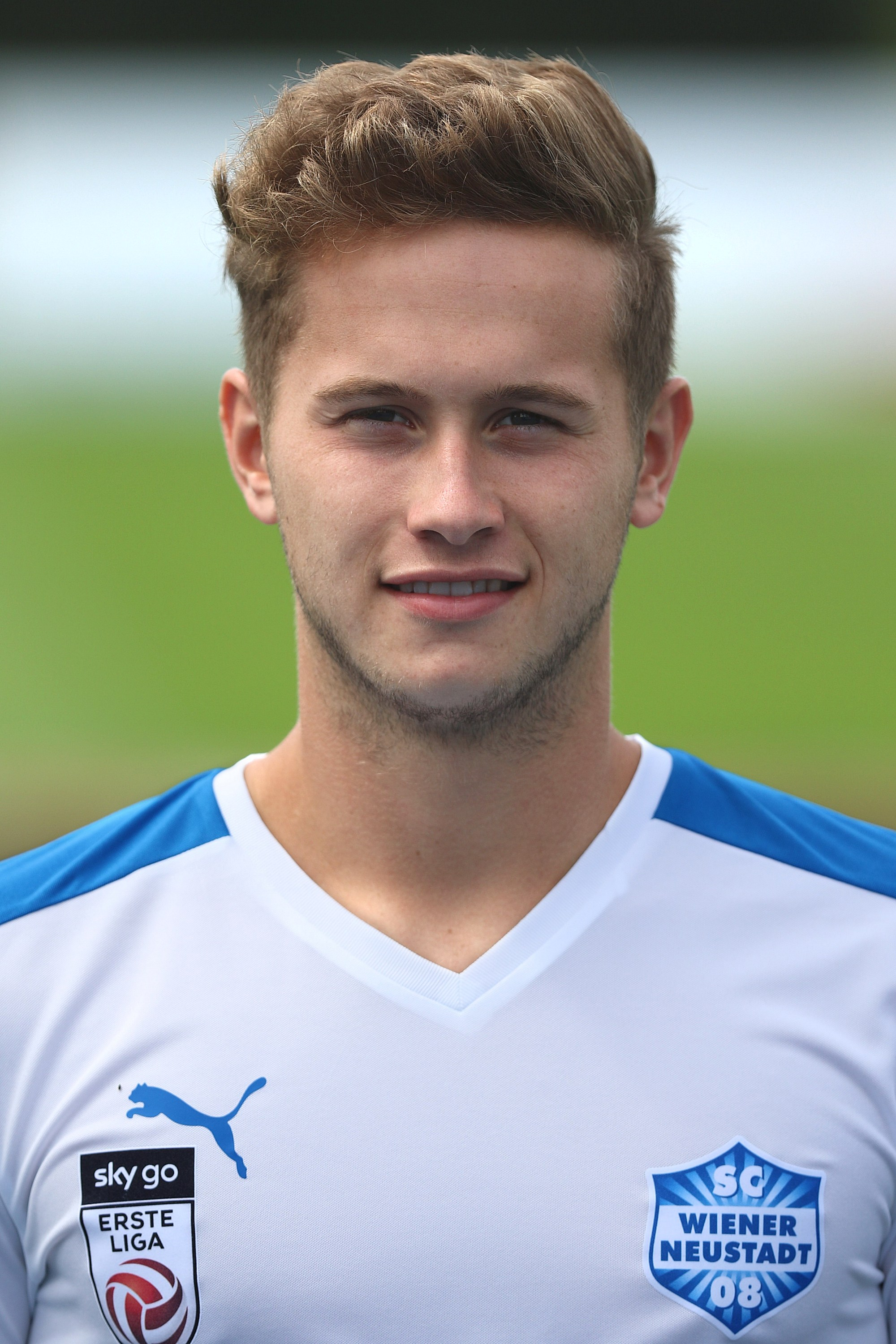
- Kobald with Ritzing in 2016

Personal information
- Date of birth: 18 August 1997 (age 29)
- Place of birth: Vienna, Austria
- Height: 1.84 m (6 ft 0 in)
- Position: Defender

Team information
- Current team: Karlsruher SC
- Number: 22

Youth career
- 2004–2006: SC Perchtoldsdorf
- 2006–2007: Admira Wacker
- 2007–2016: Austria Wien

Senior career*
Years	Team	Apps	(Gls)
2015–2016	Austria Wien II	5	(0)
2016–2017	SC Ritzing	35	(2)
2017–2018	SC Wiener Neustadt	35	(0)
2018–	Karlsruher SC	163	(9)
- * Club domestic league appearances and goals as of 18 May 2026

Christoph Kobald (born 18 August 1997) is an Austrian professional footballer who plays as a defender for Karlsruher SC.

== Club career ==
Kobald made his Austrian Football First League debut for SC Wiener Neustadt on 21 July 2017 in a game against SV Ried.
