= Malik Batmaz =

German footballer (born 2000)

Personal information
- Date of birth: 17 March 2000 (age 26)
- Place of birth: Bretten, Germany
- Height: 1.78 m (5 ft 10 in)
- Position: Forward

Team information
- Current team: Preußen Münster
- Number: 23

Youth career
- –2015: SV Sandhausen
- 2015–2019: Karlsruher SC

Senior career*
Years	Team	Apps	(Gls)
2018	Karlsruher SC II	4	(0)
2018–2023	Karlsruher SC	73	(6)
2020	→ VfB Stuttgart II (loan)	3	(2)
2023–	Preußen Münster	56	(18)

International career
2016	Turkey U17	2	(0)
- * Club domestic league appearances and goals as of 28 December 2025

Malik Batmaz (born 17 March 2000) is a professional footballer who plays as a forward for 3. Liga club Preußen Münster. Born in Germany, he has represented Turkey at youth level.

== Career ==
Batmaz made his professional debut for Karlsruher SC on 19 August 2018, appearing in the first round of the 2018–19 DFB-Pokal against Bundesliga side Hannover 96. He was substituted on in the 77th minute for Marvin Pourié, with the match finishing as a 6–0 home loss. On 13 January 2020, Batmaz moved to VfB Stuttgart II on loan for the rest of the season. He made three appearances and scored two goals, before returning to Karlsruher SC in the summer 2020.

On 6 July 2023, Batmaz signed with Preußen Münster in the 3. Liga.
