= Leon Jensen =

German footballer (born 1997)

Personal information
- Date of birth: 19 May 1997 (age 29)
- Place of birth: Berlin, Germany
- Height: 1.75 m (5 ft 9 in)
- Position: Midfielder

Team information
- Current team: Arminia Bielefeld
- Number: 31

Youth career
- –2014: Tennis Borussia Berlin
- 2014–2016: Hertha BSC

Senior career*
Years	Team	Apps	(Gls)
2016–2018	Werder Bremen II	50	(6)
2018–2019	Dudelange	8	(0)
2019–2021	FSV Zwickau	60	(7)
2021–2025	Karlsruher SC	75	(10)
2025–2026	Hertha BSC	7	(0)
2026	Hertha BSC II	2	(0)
2026–	Arminia Bielefeld	0	(0)
- * Club domestic league appearances and goals as of 28 August 2026

Leon Jensen (born 19 May 1997) is a German professional footballer who plays as a midfielder for 2. Bundesliga club Arminia Bielefeld.

== Career ==
In May 2018, following Werder Bremen II's relegation from the 3. Liga, it was announced Jensen would be one of ten players to leave the club.

On 14 May 2025, Jensen signed a two-year contract with Hertha BSC, returning to his youth club.
