= 2026–27 VfL Bochum season =

VfL Bochum
2026–27 season
- Chairman: Andreas Luthe
- Manager: Uwe Rösler
- Stadium: Ruhrstadion
- 2. Bundesliga: TBD
- DFB-Pokal: TBD
- All statistics correct as of 4 August 2026.

The 2026–27 VfL Bochum season is the 89th season in the club's history.

== Matches ==
=== Legend ===
Win Draw Loss

=== Friendly matches ===
28 June 2026 Friendly	VfL Bochum	8–0	Selection Vonovia Allstars	Bochum
16:00	Pick 45'; Hofmann 52', 55', 74'; Crimaldi 57', 58'; Turudija 68'; Taz 90+2'			Stadium: Vonovia-Ruhrstadion; Attendance: 2,531; Referee: Ali Magrouda (Wanne-Eickel)

4 July 2026 Friendly	Rot-Weiß Oberhausen	2–3	VfL Bochum	Oberhausen
15:30	Schlax 17'; Halangk 57'		Hofmann 6', 24'; Wagbe 68'	Stadium: Niederrheinstadion; Attendance: 2,542; Referee: Jonah Besong (Duisburg)

11 July 2026 Friendly	Royal Antwerp FC	0–1	VfL Bochum	Iserlohn
14:00			Taz 50'	Stadium: Hembergstadion; Referee: Felix Weller (Neunkirchen)
Note: 2× 60 minutes

15 July 2026 Friendly	AFC Ajax	1–1	VfL Bochum	Amsterdam, Netherlands
17:00	Caio Henrique 12'		Reverson 90+1' (o.g.)	Stadium: Sportpark De Toekomst; Attendance: 0 Referee: Martijn Vos (Warnsveld)
Note: The match was played behind closed doors.

21 July 2026 Friendly	Swansea City A.F.C.	0–2	VfL Bochum	Mittersill, Austria
18:00			Crimaldi 24'; Taz 45'	Stadium: Sportplatz Mittersill
Note: 3× 30 minutes

25 July 2026 Friendly	SV Werder Bremen	2–0	VfL Bochum	Zell am Ziller, Austria
13:00	Erevbenagie 42'; Musah 70' (pen.)			Stadium: Parkstadion; Attendance: 2,200; Referee: David Astl (Jenbach)
Note: 2× 60 minutes

1 August 2026 Friendly	VfL Bochum	0–0	Sheffield United F.C.	Bochum
16:00				Stadium: Ruhrstadion; Attendance: 11,304; Referee: Leonidas Exuzidis (Castrop-Rauxel)

=== 2. Bundesliga ===
==== League table ====
Pos	Team	Pld	W	D	L	GF	GA	GD	Pts	Promotion, qualification or relegation
12	Greuther Fürth	9	2	3	4	12	16	−4	9	
13	Holstein Kiel	9	1	5	3	10	11	−1	8	
14	VfL Bochum	9	2	2	5	6	10	−4	8	
15	Dynamo Dresden	9	2	2	5	11	18	−7	8	
16	Hannover 96	9	2	2	5	8	15	−7	8	Qualification for relegation play-offs

Updated to match(es) played on 25 October 2026. Source: Bundesliga
Rules for classification: 1) Points; 2) Goal difference; 3) Goals scored; 4) Head-to-head results; 5) Head-to-head away goals scored; 6) Away goals scored; 7) Play-off.
(Rules 4–6 only apply after home and away matches have been played between the tied teams.)

==== Results summary ====
Overall								Home						Away					
Pld	W	D	L	GF	GA	GD	Pts	W	D	L	GF	GA	GD	W	D	L	GF	GA	GD
5	2	1	2	4	4	0	7	0	1	2	1	3	−2	2	0	0	3	1	+2

==== Results by round ====
Round	1	2	3	4	5	6	7	8	9	10	11	12	13	14	15	16	17	18	19	20	21	22	23	24	25	26	27	28	29	30	31	32	33	34
Ground	H	A	H	A	H	A	A	H	A	H	A	H	A	H	A	H	A	H	H	A	H	A	H	H	A	H	A	H	A	H	A	H	A	H
Result	L	W	L	W	D																													
Position	15	7																																

A = Away; H = Home; W = Win; D = Draw; L = Loss

==== Matches ====
7 August 2026 1	VfL Bochum	0–1	Hertha BSC	Bochum
20:30	Wittek (yellow card) 50'; Hofmann (yellow card) 58'	Report	Eitschberger (yellow card) 34'; Grønning 39'; Seguin (yellow card) 48'; Brekalo (yellow card) 73'; Zeefuik (yellow card) 78'; Þorsteinsson (yellow card) 90+1'	Stadium: Ruhrstadion; Attendance: 26,000; Referee: Wolfgang Haslberger

14 August 2026 2	Eintracht Braunschweig	0–1	VfL Bochum	Braunschweig
18:30	Di Benedetto (yellow card) 20'; Ehlers (yellow card) 90'	Report	Hofmann 18'; Çokaj (yellow card) 20'; Pannewig (yellow card) 24'; Hanslik (yellow card) 90+1'	Stadium: Eintracht-Stadion; Attendance: 22,238; Referee: Marc Philip Eckermann

28 August 2026 3	VfL Bochum	0–1	VfL Osnabrück	Bochum
18:30	Meyer (yellow card) 49'; Hofmann (yellow card) 86'; Pannewig (yellow card) 90+2'	Report	Badjie 4', (yellow card) 64'; Kammerbauer (yellow card) 45+2'; Wiemann (yellow card) 73'; Raimund (yellow card) 90'	Stadium: Ruhrstadion; Attendance: 29,000; Referee: Wolfgang Haslberger

5 September 2026 4	Dynamo Dresden	1–2	VfL Bochum	Dresden
20:30	Bobzien 41'; Rossipal (yellow card) 45+1'		Çokaj (yellow card) 2'; Miyoshi 3', 25', (yellow card) 20'; Holtmann (yellow card) 32'; Meyer (yellow card) 35'; Olsen (yellow card) 36'; Wittek (yellow card) 40'; Steuckers (yellow card) 78'	Stadium: Rudolf-Harbig-Stadion; Referee: Harm Osmers

12 September 2026 5	VfL Bochum	1–1	SpVgg Greuther Fürth	Bochum
13:00	Hofmann 17'; Pannewig (yellow card) 28' (yellow-red card) 82'	Report	Sillah 71'; Steuckers (yellow card) 78'	Stadium: Ruhrstadion; Attendance: 23,654; Referee: Felix Bickel

20 September 2026 6	Hannover 96	v	VfL Bochum	Hanover
13:30				Stadium: Heinz-von-Heiden-Arena

7	VfL Bochum	v	Arminia Bielefeld	Bochum
				Stadium: Ruhrstadion

8	1. FC Kaiserslautern	v	VfL Bochum	Kaiserslautern
				Stadium: Fritz-Walter-Stadion

9	VfL Bochum	v	VfL Wolfsburg	Bochum
				Stadium: Ruhrstadion

10	FC Energie Cottbus	v	VfL Bochum	Cottbus
				Stadium: Stadion der Freundschaft

11	VfL Bochum	v	Karlsruher SC	Bochum
				Stadium: Ruhrstadion

12	FC St. Pauli	v	VfL Bochum	Hamburg
				Stadium: Millerntor-Stadion

13	VfL Bochum	v	SV Darmstadt 98	Bochum
				Stadium: Ruhrstadion

14	1. FC Nürnberg	v	VfL Bochum	Nuremberg
				Stadium: Max-Morlock-Stadion

15	VfL Bochum	v	1. FC Heidenheim	Bochum
				Stadium: Ruhrstadion

16	VfL Bochum	v	1. FC Magdeburg	Bochum
				Stadium: Ruhrstadion

17	Holstein Kiel	v	VfL Bochum	Kiel
				Stadium: Holstein-Stadion

18	Hertha BSC	v	VfL Bochum	Berlin
				Stadium: Olympiastadion

19	VfL Bochum	v	Eintracht Braunschweig	Bochum
				Stadium: Ruhrstadion

20	VfL Osnabrück	v	VfL Bochum	Osnabrück
				Stadium: Stadion an der Bremer Brücke

21	VfL Bochum	v	Dynamo Dresden	Bochum
				Stadium: Ruhrstadion

22	SpVgg Greuther Fürth	v	VfL Bochum	Fürth
				Stadium: Sportpark Ronhof Thomas Sommer

23	VfL Bochum	v	Hannover 96	Bochum
				Stadium: Ruhrstadion

24	Arminia Bielefeld	v	VfL Bochum	Bielefeld
				Stadium: Schüco-Arena

25	VfL Bochum	v	1. FC Kaiserslautern	Bochum
				Stadium: Ruhrstadion

26	VfL Wolfsburg	v	VfL Bochum	Wolfsburg
				Stadium: Volkswagen Arena

27	VfL Bochum	v	FC Energie Cottbus	Bochum
				Stadium: Ruhrstadion

28	Karlsruher SC	v	VfL Bochum	Karlsruhe
				Stadium: BBBank Wildpark

29	VfL Bochum	v	FC St. Pauli	Bochum
				Stadium: Ruhrstadion

30	SV Darmstadt 98	v	VfL Bochum	Darmstadt
				Stadium: Merck-Stadion am Böllenfalltor

31	VfL Bochum	v	1. FC Nürnberg	Bochum
				Stadium: Ruhrstadion

32	1. FC Heidenheim	v	VfL Bochum	Heidenheim an der Brenz
				Stadium: Voith-Arena

33	1. FC Magdeburg	v	VfL Bochum	Magdeburg
				Stadium: Avnet Arena

34	VfL Bochum	v	Holstein Kiel	Bochum
				Stadium: Ruhrstadion

=== DFB-Pokal ===
23 August 2026 R1	SpVgg Greuther Fürth	1–2	VfL Bochum	Fürth
13:00	Dal 77'		Rasmussen 25'; Hofmann 64'	Stadium: Sportpark Ronhof Thomas Sommer; Referee: Florian Lechner

27 October 2026 R2	VfL Bochum	2–0	Mainz 05	Bochum
18:00	Rasmussen 46'; T. Meyer (yellow card) 66'; Hofmann 75'; L Isbruch (yellow card) 90+6'; Klaiber (yellow card) 90+7'	Report	Königsdörffer (yellow card) 64'	Stadium: Vonovia Ruhrstadion; Attendance: 20,432; Referee: Michael Bacher

== Squad ==
=== Squad and statistics ===
==== Squad, appearances and goals scored ====
No.	Pos	Nat	Player	Total		2. Bundesliga		DFB-Pokal	
No.	Pos	Nat	Player	Apps	Goals	Apps	Goals	Apps	Goals
1	GK	(Germany) GER	Timo Horn	0	0	0	0	0	0
3	DF	(Germany) GER	Philipp Strompf	0	0	0	0	0	0
4	DF	(Germany) GER	Yiğit Karademir	0	0	0	0	0	0
5	DF	(Estonia) EST	Karol Mets (since 17 July 2026)	0	0	0	0	0	0
6	MF	(Albania) ALB	Enis Çokaj	0	0	0	0	0	0
7	MF	(Denmark) DEN	Christian Rasmussen (since 8 July 2026)	0	0	0	0	0	0
8	MF	(Germany) GER	Jean-Manuel Mbom	0	0	0	0	0	0
9	FW	(Mali) MLI	Ibrahim Sissoko	0	0	0	0	0	0
10	MF	(Germany) GER	Berkan Taz	0	0	0	0	0	0
11	MF	(Germany) GER	Moritz Kwarteng (until 7 July 2026)	0	0	0	0	0	0
13	DF	(Denmark) DEN	Oliver Olsen	0	0	0	0	0	0
15	DF	(Austria) AUT	Michael Steinwender	0	0	0	0	0	0
16	GK	(Austria) AUT	Tino Casali (since 16 July 2026)	0	0	0	0	0	0
17	MF	(Philippines) PHI	Gerrit Holtmann	0	0	0	0	0	0
18	DF	(Norway) NOR	Mikkel Rakneberg	0	0	0	0	0	0
19	FW	(Germany) GER	Daniel Hanslik	0	0	0	0	0	0
22	GK	(Germany) GER	Niclas Thiede (until 15 July 2026)	0	0	0	0	0	0
23	MF	(Japan) JPN	Kōji Miyoshi	0	0	0	0	0	0
24	MF	(Germany) GER	Mats Pannewig	0	0	0	0	0	0
25	FW	(Germany) GER	Samuel Bamba (until 30 July 2026)	0	0	0	0	0	0
27	FW	(Germany) GER	Babis Drakas	0	0	0	0	0	0
30	DF	(Germany) GER	Darnell Keumo (until 4 August 2026)	0	0	0	0	0	0
32	DF	(Germany) GER	Maximilian Wittek	0	0	0	0	0	0
33	FW	(Germany) GER	Philipp Hofmann	0	0	0	0	0	0
34	MF	(Germany) GER	Tom Meyer	0	0	0	0	0	0
35	DF	(Germany) GER	Kacper Koscierski	0	0	0	0	0	0
36	FW	(Germany) GER	Luis Pick	0	0	0	0	0	0
37	FW	(Italy) ITA	Alessandro Crimaldi	0	0	0	0	0	0
38	GK	(Germany) GER	Hugo Rölleke	0	0	0	0	0	0
39	MF	(Germany) GER	Lasse Isbruch	0	0	0	0	0	0
40	MF	(Germany) GER	Aurel Wagbe (since 28 June 2026)	0	0	0	0	0	0
41	DF	(Germany) GER	Mohammed Tolba (since 28 June 2026)	0	0	0	0	0	0
41	DF	(Denmark) DEN	Gustav Schjøtt (since 15 July 2026)	0	0	0	0	0	0
42	DF	(Germany) GER	Leon Sawas (since 28 June 2026)	0	0	0	0	0	0
43	DF	(Germany) GER	Luca Bernsdorf (since 28 June 2026)	0	0	0	0	0	0
44	MF	(Germany) GER	Vahidin Turudija (since 28 June 2026)	0	0	0	0	0	0
—	MF	(Germany) GER	Moritz Göttlicher	0	0	0	0	0	0
—	FW	(Kosovo) KOS	Lirim Jashari	0	0	0	0	0	0

=== Transfers ===
==== Summer ====
In:

No.	Pos.	Nation	Player
4	DF	GER	Yiğit Karademir (from VfL Osnabrück)
5	DF	EST	Karol Mets (from FC St. Pauli)
6	MF	ALB	Enis Çokaj (from Panathinaikos, previously on loan at Levadiakos)
7	MF	DEN	Christian Rasmussen (from Fortuna Düsseldorf)
8	MF	GER	Jean-Manuel Mbom (from Viborg FF)
10	MF	GER	Berkan Taz (from SC Verl)
15	DF	AUT	Michael Steinwender (from Heart of Midlothian F.C.)
16	GK	AUT	Tino Casali (from Rot-Weiss Essen)
19	FW	GER	Daniel Hanslik (from 1. FC Kaiserslautern)
27	FW	GER	Babis Drakas (from Borussia Dortmund II)
—	FW	KOS	Lirim Jashari (loan return from MVV Maastricht)

Out:

No.	Pos.	Nation	Player
4	DF	SRB	Erhan Mašović (released)
7	DF	GER	Kevin Vogt (retired)
8	MF	GER	Kjell Wätjen (loan return to Borussia Dortmund)
11	MF	GER	Moritz Kwarteng (to 1. FC Magdeburg)
14	FW	FRA	Mathis Clairicia (to FC Sochaux, previously on loan at Alverca)
16	FW	NIR	Callum Marshall (loan return to West Ham United F.C.)
19	MF	SVK	Matúš Bero (released)
20	DF	SUI	Noah Loosli (released)
21	MF	GER	Francis Onyeka (loan return to Bayer 04 Leverkusen)
22	GK	GER	Niclas Thiede (to ADO Den Haag)
25	DF	GER	Daniel Hülsenbusch (to SSV Ulm 1846)
25	FW	GER	Samuel Bamba (to Marítimo, previously on loan at Willem II)
26	DF	GER	Romario Rösch (released)
27	MF	GER	Niklas Jahn (to FC Viktoria Köln)
28	MF	GER	Lennart Koerdt (to Westfalia Rhynern)
29	FW	GER	Farid Alfa-Ruprecht (loan return to Bayer 04 Leverkusen)
30	DF	GER	Darnell Keumo (on loan to SV Waldhof Mannheim)
31	MF	GER	Marcel Sobottka (released)
34	MF	GER	Cajetan Lenz (to TSG 1899 Hoffenheim)
39	DF	GER	Leandro Morgalla (loan return to RB Salzburg)
