= 2025–26 VfL Bochum season =

VfL Bochum
2025–26 season
- Chairman: Andreas Luthe
- Head coach: Dieter Hecking (until 15 September 2025); David Siebers, ad interim (until 5 October 2025); Uwe Rösler (since 6 October 2025)
- Stadium: Vonovia-Ruhrstadion
- 2. Bundesliga: 9th
- DFB-Pokal: Round of 16
- Top goalscorer: League: Philipp Hofmann (12); All: Philipp Hofmann (12)
- Highest home attendance: 26,000 (vs Münster, 30 August 2025, vs Düsseldorf, 27 September 2025, vs Magdeburg, 2 November 2025, vs Karlsruhe, 20 December 2025, vs Schalke, 31 January 2026; vs Nürnberg, 20 February 2026; vs Kaiserslautern, 7 March 2026; vs Braunschweig, 12 April 2026; vs Hannover, 9 May 2026)
- Lowest home attendance: 24,109 (vs Fürth, 26 April 2026)
- Average home league attendance: 25,594
Home colours	Away colours	Third colours

The 2025–26 VfL Bochum season was the 88th season in the club's history.

== Review and events ==
On 15 September 2025 head coach Dieter Hecking and athletic director Dirk Dufner were sacked. David Siebers was appointed caretaker. On 2 October 2025 the club announced the appointment of Uwe Rösler as head coach starting 6 October 2025.

== Matches ==
=== Legend ===
Win Draw Loss

=== Friendly matches ===
3 July 2025 Friendly	VfL Bochum	14–0	TuS Harpen	Bochum
18:30	Bamba 4', 10'; Broschinski 15', 22', 30' (pen.); Jashari 19', 39'; Crimaldi 33'; Passlack 51'; Miyoshi 60'; Pannewig 70', 90'; Albrecht 74' (o.g.); Clairicia 87'			Stadium: Leichtathletikplatz am Vonovia-Ruhrstadion; Attendance: 1,500; Referee: Lea Bramkamp (Hattingen)

6 July 2025 Friendly	Wuppertaler SV	0–5	VfL Bochum	Wuppertal
15:30			Ibrahim Sissoko 20'; Broschinski 47', 74', 88' (pen.); Clairicia 51'	Stadium: Stadion am Zoo; Attendance: 3,877; Referee: Jonah Besong (Duisburg)

12 July 2025 Friendly	FC Viktoria Plzeň	1–1	VfL Bochum	Kufstein, Austria
13:00	Šulc 35' (pen.)		Broschinski 61'	Stadium: Grenzlandstadion; Referee: Andreas Staudinger (Innsbruck)

16 July 2025 Friendly	SV Waldhof Mannheim	2–3	VfL Bochum	Angerberg, Austria
13:00	Hoffmann 37'; Asallari 60' (pen.)		Ibrahim Sissoko 62', 64'; Wittek 67'	Stadium: Sportzentrum; Attendance: 300; Referee: Dr. Daniel Bramböck (Wörgl)

16 July 2025 Friendly	BSC Young Boys	4–5	VfL Bochum	Schwaz, Austria
18:00	Fassnacht 2', 42'; Bedia 31'; Maleš 35'		Holtmann 40'; Clairicia 63'; Broschinski 66', 76'; Keumo 73'	Stadium: Silberstadt Arena; Attendance: 1,200; Referee: Arnes Talic (Salzburg)

19 July 2025 Friendly	FC Metalist 1925 Kharkiv	0–0	VfL Bochum	Schwaz, Austria
15:00				Stadium: Silberstadt Arena; Referee: Ali Mutlu (Stans)
Note: 2× 60 minutes

27 July 2025 Friendly	VfL Bochum	0–2	Bayer 04 Leverkusen	Bochum
18:00			Hofmann 23'; Schick 45+1'	Stadium: Vonovia-Ruhrstadion; Attendance: 15,788; Referee: Felix Weller (Osnabrück)

4 September 2025 Friendly	VfL Bochum	1–0	MSV Duisburg	Bochum
14:00	Pannewig 69'			Stadium: Leichtathletikplatz am Vonovia-Ruhrstadion; Attendance: 0 Referee: Leonidas Exuzidis (Castrop-Rauxel)
Note: The match was played behind closed doors, due to safety concerns.

9 October 2025 Friendly	VfL Bochum	3–3	Alemannia Aachen	Bochum
14:00	Hofmann 38'; Obafemi 55'; Ibrahim Sissoko 65'		Heister 26'; Sulejmani 84', 86'	Stadium: Leichtathletikplatz am Vonovia-Ruhrstadion; Attendance: 0 Referee: Dominic Stock (Langenberg)
Note: The match was played behind closed doors, due to safety concerns.

15 November 2025 Friendly	VfL Bochum	1–4	VfL Osnabrück	Bochum
12:00	Jahn 25'		Badjie 35'; Lesueur 62'; Kopacz 79'; Wiethaup 86'	Stadium: Trainingsplatz 3 am Vonovia-Ruhrstadion; Attendance: 0 Referee: Florian Exner (Münster)
Note: The match was played behind closed doors, due to safety concerns.

10 January 2026 Friendly	Alemannia Aachen	1–2	VfL Bochum	Kadriye, Turkey
12:00	Loune 16'		Onyeka 11'; Miyoshi 72'	Stadium: Calista Sports Center Field B Attendance: 100

27 March 2026 Friendly	VfL Bochum	0–4	Rot-Weiss Essen	Bochum
12:00			Schultz 21'; Safi 49'; Reisig 58'; Brumme 65'	Stadium: Traininggrounds at the Vonovia-Ruhrstadion; Attendance: 0
Note: The match was played behind closed doors, due to safety concerns.

=== 2. Bundesliga ===
==== League table ====
Pos	Team	Pld	W	D	L	GF	GA	GD	Pts
7	Hertha BSC	34	14	9	11	47	44	+3	51
8	1. FC Nürnberg	34	12	10	12	47	45	+2	46
9	VfL Bochum	34	11	11	12	49	47	+2	44
10	Karlsruher SC	34	12	8	14	53	64	−11	44
11	Dynamo Dresden	34	11	8	15	54	53	+1	41

Source: Bundesliga
Rules for classification: 1) Points; 2) Goal difference; 3) Goals scored; 4) Head-to-head results; 5) Head-to-head away goals scored; 6) Away goals scored; 7) Play-off.
(Rules 4–6 only apply after home and away matches have been played between the tied teams.)

==== Results summary ====
Overall								Home						Away					
Pld	W	D	L	GF	GA	GD	Pts	W	D	L	GF	GA	GD	W	D	L	GF	GA	GD
34	11	11	12	49	47	+2	44	8	5	4	30	21	+9	3	6	8	19	26	−7

==== Results by round ====
Round	1	2	3	4	5	6	7	8	9	10	11	12	13	14	15	16	17	18	19	20	21	22	23	24	25	26	27	28	29	30	31	32	33	34
Ground	A	H	A	H	A	A	H	A	H	A	H	A	H	A	H	A	H	A	H	A	H	A	H	A	H	A	H	A	H	A	H	A	H	A
Result	L	W	L	L	L	L	L	L	W	D	W	W	L	W	W	D	D	D	D	W	D	D	D	L	W	D	L	L	W	L	W	D	D	W
Position	17	11	14	16	16	17	17	17	17	17	14	13	14	12	9	9	10	11	11	8	8	9	10	10	9	9	10	10	10	10	10	11	10	9

A = Away; H = Home; W = Win; D = Draw; L = Loss

==== Matches ====
2 August 2025 1	SV Darmstadt 98	4–1	VfL Bochum	Darmstadt
13:00	Lidberg 5', 45', 48'; Vukotić 56'		Broschinski 33'	Stadium: Merck-Stadion am Böllenfalltor; Attendance: 17,500; Referee: Max Burda (Berlin)

10 August 2025 2	VfL Bochum	2–0	SV Elversberg	Bochum
13:30	Ibrahima Sissoko 66'; Holtmann 90+1'			Stadium: Vonovia-Ruhrstadion; Attendance: 24,207; Referee: Lukas Benen (Nordhorn)

23 August 2025 3	FC Schalke 04	2–1	VfL Bochum	Gelsenkirchen
20:30	Kuruçay 75'; Lasme 79'		Holtmann 65'	Stadium: Veltins-Arena; Attendance: 62,083; Referee: Frank Willenborg (Osnabrück)

30 August 2025 4	VfL Bochum	1–2	SC Preußen Münster	Bochum
13:00	Hofmann 43'		Mees 27', 49'	Stadium: Vonovia-Ruhrstadion; Attendance: 26,000; Referee: Felix Prigan (Deizisau)

12 September 2025 5	SC Paderborn 07	1–0	VfL Bochum	Paderborn
18:30	Copado 90'			Stadium: Home Deluxe Arena; Attendance: 15,000; Referee: Florian Exner (Münster)

20 September 2025 6	1. FC Nürnberg	2–1	VfL Bochum	Nuremberg
20:30	Justvan 68'; Grimaldi 90+2'		Ibrahim Sissoko 86' (pen.)	Stadium: Max-Morlock-Stadion; Attendance: 33,398; Referee: Lars Erbst (Gerlingen)

27 September 2025 7	VfL Bochum	0–1	Fortuna Düsseldorf	Bochum
20:30			Oberdorf 4'	Stadium: Vonovia-Ruhrstadion; Attendance: 26,000; Referee: Daniel Schlager (Gernsbach)

4 October 2025 8	1. FC Kaiserslautern	3–2	VfL Bochum	Kaiserslautern
13:00	Prtajin 7', 79'; Joly 86'		Holtmann 15'; Elvedi 90+4' (o.g.)	Stadium: Fritz-Walter-Stadion; Attendance: 48,155; Referee: Michael Bacher (Rosenheim)

18 October 2025 9	VfL Bochum	3–2	Hertha BSC	Bochum
20:30	Karbownik 13' (o.g.); Onyeka 32', 60'		Schuler 72'; Reese 80' (pen.)	Stadium: Vonovia-Ruhrstadion; Attendance: 25,800; Referee: Matthias Jöllenbeck (Freiburg)

25 October 2025 10	Holstein Kiel	1–1	VfL Bochum	Kiel
13:00	Köster 86'		Onyeka 55' (pen.)	Stadium: Holstein-Stadion; Attendance: 15,034; Referee: Florian Lechner (Insel Poel)

2 November 2025 11	VfL Bochum	2–0	1. FC Magdeburg	Bochum
13:30	Wätjen 41'; Holtmann 60'			Stadium: Vonovia-Ruhrstadion; Attendance: 26,000; Referee: Felix Wagner (Glött)

9 November 2025 12	Eintracht Braunschweig	0–2	VfL Bochum	Braunschweig
13:30			Lenz 7'; Onyeka 73'	Stadium: Eintracht-Stadion; Attendance: 21,455; Referee: Konrad Oldhafer (Poppenbüttel)

21 November 2025 13	VfL Bochum	1–2	Dynamo Dresden	Bochum
18:30	Lenz 59'		Rossipal 25'; Vermeij 45+1'	Stadium: Vonovia-Ruhrstadion; Attendance: 25,940; Referee: Lars Erbst (Gerlingen)

29 November 2025 14	SpVgg Greuther Fürth	0–3	VfL Bochum	Fürth
13:00			Ibrahima Sissoko 9', 13'; Hofmann 17'	Stadium: Sportpark Ronhof Thomas Sommer; Attendance: 10,879; Referee: Jarno Wienefeld (Hamburg)

6 December 2025 15	VfL Bochum	1–0	Arminia Bielefeld	Bochum
13:00	Hofmann 70'			Stadium: Vonovia-Ruhrstadion; Attendance: 25,429; Referee: Wolfgang Haslberger (St. Wolfgang)

13 December 2025 16	Hannover 96	0–0	VfL Bochum	Hanover
20:30				Stadium: Heinz-von-Heiden-Arena; Attendance: 42,300; Referee: Tobias Reichel (Sindelfingen)

20 December 2025 17	VfL Bochum	2–2	Karlsruher SC	Bochum
13:00	Onyeka 35', 69'		Wanitzek 47'; Fukuda 86'	Stadium: Vonovia-Ruhrstadion; Attendance: 26,000; Referee: Marc Philip Eckermann (Winnenden)

18 January 2026 18	VfL Bochum	3–3	SV Darmstadt 98	Bochum
13:30	Onyeka 11'; Hofmann 27'; Marshall 82'		Hornby 7'; Lidberg 36'; Morgalla 68' (o.g.)	Stadium: Vonovia-Ruhrstadion; Attendance: 24,922; Referee: Felix Bickel (Wolfsburg)

25 January 2026 19	SV Elversberg	1–1	VfL Bochum	Spiesen-Elversberg
13:30	Petkov 53'		Pannewig 24'	Stadium: Waldstadion an der Kaiserlinde; Attendance: 9,307; Referee: Robert Kampka (Cologne)

31 January 2026 20	VfL Bochum	2–0	FC Schalke 04	Bochum
13:00	Miyoshi 1'; Hofmann 43'			Stadium: Vonovia-Ruhrstadion; Attendance: 26,000; Referee: Michael Bacher (Rosenheim)

6 February 2026 21	SC Preußen Münster	1–1	VfL Bochum	Münster
18:30	Rondić 35'		Miyoshi 59'	Stadium: LVM-Preußenstadion; Attendance: 10,642; Referee: Patrick Alt (Illingen)

15 February 2026 22	VfL Bochum	0–0	SC Paderborn 07	Bochum
13:30				Stadium: Vonovia-Ruhrstadion; Attendance: 25,656; Referee: Tom Bauer (Mainz)

20 February 2026 23	VfL Bochum	1–1	1. FC Nürnberg	Bochum
18:30	Onyeka 72' (pen.)		Zoma 38'	Stadium: Vonovia-Ruhrstadion; Attendance: 26,000; Referee: Patrick Ittrich (Hamburg)

27 February 2026 24	Fortuna Düsseldorf	2–1	VfL Bochum	Düsseldorf
18:30	Itten 45'; Muslija 57'		Alfa-Ruprecht 79'	Stadium: Merkur Spiel-Arena; Attendance: 41,737; Referee: Robert Hartmann (Wangen im Allgäu)

7 March 2026 25	VfL Bochum	3–2	1. FC Kaiserslautern	Bochum
20:30	Hofmann 9'; Marshall 66'; Pannewig 69'		Bassette 30'; Ritter 50'	Stadium: Vonovia-Ruhrstadion; Attendance: 26,000; Referee: Max Burda (Berlin)

14 March 2026 26	Hertha BSC	1–1	VfL Bochum	Berlin
20:30	Kownacki 45' (pen.)		Morgalla 90+1'	Stadium: Olympiastadion; Attendance: 47,520; Referee: Michael Bacher (Rosenheim)

22 March 2026 27	VfL Bochum	2–3	Holstein Kiel	Bochum
13:30	Hofmann 14', 66'		Davidsen 8'; Harres 45+1'; Therkelsen 70'	Stadium: Vonovia-Ruhrstadion; Attendance: 25,039; Referee: Patrick Alt (Illingen)

4 April 2026 28	1. FC Magdeburg	4–1	VfL Bochum	Magdeburg
13:00	Musonda 6'; Atik 44'; Żukowski 71', 73'		Hofmann 56'	Stadium: Avnet Arena; Attendance: 25,030; Referee: Felix Prigan (Deizisau)

12 April 2026 29	VfL Bochum	4–1	Eintracht Braunschweig	Bochum
13:30	Holtmann 13'; Miyoshi 45+5'; Alfa-Ruprecht 68'; Hofmann 90+5' (pen.)		Tempelmann 84'	Stadium: Vonovia-Ruhrstadion; Attendance: 26,000; Referee: Wolfgang Haslberger (St. Wolfgang)

18 April 2026 30	Dynamo Dresden	2–0	VfL Bochum	Dresden
13:00	Ceka 5'; Vermeij 58'			Stadium: Rudolf-Harbig-Stadion; Attendance: 30,616; Referee: Robert Schröder (Hannover)

26 April 2026 31	VfL Bochum	2–1	SpVgg Greuther Fürth	Bochum
13:30	Hofmann 1', 56'		Futkeu 88'	Stadium: Vonovia-Ruhrstadion; Attendance: 24,109; Referee: Frank Willenborg (Osnabrück)

2 May 2026 32	Arminia Bielefeld	1–1	VfL Bochum	Bielefeld
13:00	Grodowski 27' (pen.)		Kwarteng 79'	Stadium: Schüco-Arena; Attendance: 26,750; Referee: Tobias Stieler (Sölden)

9 May 2026 33	VfL Bochum	1–1	Hannover 96	Bochum
13:00	Alfa-Ruprecht 55'		Nawrocki 50'	Stadium: Vonovia-Ruhrstadion; Attendance: 26,000; Referee: Robert Kampka (Cologne)

17 May 2026 34	Karlsruher SC	1–2	VfL Bochum	Karlsruhe
15:30	Fukuda 19'		Wätjen 4'; Kwarteng 70'	Stadium: BBBank Wildpark; Attendance: 32,244; Referee: Patrick Alt (Illingen)

=== DFB-Pokal ===
16 August 2025 R1	Berliner FC Dynamo	1–3 (a.e.t.)	VfL Bochum	Berlin
13:00	Shcherbakovski 46'		Loosli 85'; Bamba 107'; Bero 120+1'	Stadium: Sportforum Hohenschönhausen; Attendance: 4,705; Referee: Felix Wagner (Glött)

28 October 2025 R2	FC Augsburg	0–1	VfL Bochum	Augsburg
20:45			Holtmann 39'	Stadium: Augsburg Arena; Attendance: 20,280; Referee: Sascha Stegemann (Niederkassel)

3 December 2025 R3	VfL Bochum	0–2	VfB Stuttgart	Bochum
18:00			Strompf 12' (o.g.); Undav 47'	Stadium: Vonovia-Ruhrstadion; Attendance: 25,940; Referee: Florian Badstübner (Nürnberg)

== Squad ==
=== Squad and statistics ===
==== Squad, appearances and goals scored ====
No.	Pos	Nat	Player	Total		2. Bundesliga		DFB-Pokal	
No.	Pos	Nat	Player	Apps	Goals	Apps	Goals	Apps	Goals
1	GK	(Germany) GER	Timo Horn (vice-captain)	37	0	34	0	3	0
3	DF	(Germany) GER	Philipp Strompf	29	0	27	0	2	0
4	DF	(Serbia) SRB	Erhan Mašović	15	0	13	0	2	0
5	DF	(Germany) GER	Colin Kleine-Bekel (until 7 January 2026)	1	0	1	0	0	0
6	MF	(Mali) MLI	Ibrahima Sissoko (until 12 January 2026)	8	3	6	3	2	0
7	DF	(Germany) GER	Kevin Vogt (since 7 July 2025)	11	0	10	0	1	0
8	MF	(Germany) GER	Kjell Wätjen	29	2	26	2	3	0
9	FW	(Mali) MLI	Ibrahim Sissoko	6	1	6	1	0	0
10	FW	(Republic of Ireland) IRL	Michael Obafemi (from 1 September 2025 until 21 January 2026)	3	0	2	0	1	0
11	MF	(Germany) GER	Moritz Kwarteng	20	2	18	2	2	0
13	DF	(Denmark) DEN	Oliver Olsen (since 2 February 2026)	14	0	14	0	0	0
14	FW	(France) FRA	Mathis Clairicia (until 15 January 2026)	10	0	9	0	1	0
15	DF	(Germany) GER	Felix Passlack (until 2 February 2026)	19	0	16	0	3	0
16	FW	(Northern Ireland) NIR	Callum Marshall (since 7 January 2026)	16	2	16	2	0	0
17	MF	(Philippines) PHI	Gerrit Holtmann	27	6	25	5	2	1
18	FW	(Germany) GER	Samuel Bamba (until 29 August 2025)	1	1	0	0	1	1
18	DF	(Norway) NOR	Mikkel Rakneberg (since 2 January 2026)	5	0	5	0	0	0
19	MF	(Slovakia) SVK	Matúš Bero (captain)	25	1	24	0	1	1
20	DF	(Switzerland) SUI	Noah Loosli	31	1	28	0	3	1
21	MF	(Germany) GER	Francis Onyeka	32	8	30	8	2	0
22	GK	(Germany) GER	Niclas Thiede	0	0	0	0	0	0
23	MF	(Japan) JPN	Kōji Miyoshi	23	3	22	3	1	0
24	MF	(Germany) GER	Mats Pannewig	30	2	27	2	3	0
25	DF	(Germany) GER	Daniel Hülsenbusch (since 14 July 2025)	1	0	1	0	0	0
26	DF	(Germany) GER	Romario Rösch	5	0	5	0	0	0
27	MF	(Germany) GER	Niklas Jahn	0	0	0	0	0	0
28	MF	(Germany) GER	Lennart Koerdt	0	0	0	0	0	0
29	FW	(Germany) GER	Moritz Broschinski (until 12 August 2025)	2	1	2	1	0	0
29	FW	(Germany) GER	Farid Alfa-Ruprecht (since 1 September 2025)	28	3	26	3	2	0
30	DF	(Germany) GER	Darnell Keumo	2	0	2	0	0	0
31	GK	(Germany) GER	Jeremias Heufken (since 14 July 2025)	0	0	0	0	0	0
31	MF	(Germany) GER	Marcel Sobottka (since 15 January 2026)	2	0	2	0	0	0
32	DF	(Germany) GER	Maximilian Wittek	32	0	29	0	3	0
33	FW	(Germany) GER	Philipp Hofmann	35	12	32	12	3	0
34	MF	(Germany) GER	Cajetan Lenz	34	2	31	2	3	0
35	DF	(Germany) GER	Kacper Koscierski	13	0	11	0	2	0
36	FW	(Kosovo) KOS	Lirim Jashari (until 1 Februar 2026)	0	0	0	0	0	0
37	FW	(Italy) ITA	Alessandro Crimaldi	0	0	0	0	0	0
38	GK	(Germany) GER	Hugo Rölleke	0	0	0	0	0	0
39	DF	(Germany) GER	Leandro Morgalla	35	1	33	1	2	0
40	FW	(Germany) GER	Luis Pick	0	0	0	0	0	0
41	MF	(Germany) GER	Amos Gerth (since 15 November 2025)	0	0	0	0	0	0
41	MF	(Germany) GER	Henri Sanchez Fernandez (since 9 October 2025)	0	0	0	0	0	0
41	MF	(Germany) GER	Ruben Schneider (since 15 November 2025)	0	0	0	0	0	0
42	MF	(Germany) GER	Keanu Kerbsties (since 9 October 2025)	0	0	0	0	0	0
42	FW	(Germany) GER	Louis Köster (since 27 March 2026)	0	0	0	0	0	0
42	DF	(Germany) GER	Stevan Tasić (since 4 September 2025)	0	0	0	0	0	0
47	FW	(Germany) GER	Jonathan Akaegbobi (since 9 October 2025)	0	0	0	0	0	0
48	MF	(Germany) GER	Tom Meyer (since 4 September 2025)	0	0	0	0	0	0
49	MF	(Germany) GER	Lasse Isbruch	0	0	0	0	0	0
—	MF	(North Macedonia) MKD	Agon Elezi (until 14 July 2025)	0	0	0	0	0	0

=== Transfers ===
==== Summer ====
In:

No.	Pos.	Nation	Player
3	DF	GER	Philipp Strompf (from SSV Ulm 1846)
5	DF	GER	Colin Kleine-Bekel (from Holstein Kiel)
7	DF	GER	Kevin Vogt (from 1. FC Union Berlin)
8	MF	GER	Kjell Wätjen (on loan from Borussia Dortmund)
9	FW	MLI	Ibrahim Sissoko (from (France) AS Saint-Étienne)
10	FW	IRL	Michael Obafemi (on loan from (England) Burnley F.C.)
11	MF	GER	Moritz Kwarteng (loan return from Fortuna Düsseldorf)
14	FW	FRA	Mathis Clairicia (from (France) LB Châteauroux)
20	DF	SUI	Noah Loosli (loan return from SpVgg Greuther Fürth)
21	MF	GER	Francis Onyeka (on loan from Bayer 04 Leverkusen)
22	GK	GER	Niclas Thiede (loan return from SSV Ulm 1846)
26	DF	GER	Romario Rösch (from SSV Ulm 1846)
29	FW	GER	Farid Alfa-Ruprecht (on loan from Bayer 04 Leverkusen)
30	DF	GER	Darnell Keumo (from VfL Bochum youth)
39	DF	GER	Leandro Morgalla (on loan from (Austria) RB Salzburg)
40	FW	GER	Luis Pick (from VfL Bochum youth)
49	MF	GER	Lasse Isbruch (from VfL Bochum youth)

Out:

No.	Pos.	Nation	Player
2	DF	CRC	Cristian Gamboa (retired)
5	DF	BRA	Bernardo (to TSG 1899 Hoffenheim)
7	MF	GER	Lukas Daschner (to (Switzerland) FC St. Gallen, previously on loan)
8	MF	FRA	Anthony Losilla (retired)
9	FW	NED	Myron Boadu (loan return to (France) AS Monaco FC)
10	MF	NED	Dani de Wit (to (Netherlands) FC Utrecht)
11	FW	GRE	Georgios Masouras (loan return to (Greece) Olympiacos F.C.)
13	DF	CRO	Jakov Medić (loan return to (Netherlands) AFC Ajax)
14	DF	GER	Tim Oermann (to Bayer 04 Leverkusen)
17	MF	GER	Tom Krauß (loan return to 1. FSV Mainz 05)
18	FW	GER	Samuel Bamba (on loan to (Netherlands) Willem II Tilburg)
20	DF	UKR	Ivan Ordets (released)
25	DF	GER	Mohammed Tolba (released)
27	GK	GER	Patrick Drewes (to Borussia Dortmund)
29	FW	GER	Moritz Broschinski (to (Switzerland) FC Basel)
34	GK	GER	Paul Grave (to 1. FC Bocholt)
—	MF	MKD	Agon Elezi (to (Bosnia and Herzegovina) FK Sarajevo, previously on loan at (Croatia) HNK Gorica)

==== Winter ====
In:

No.	Pos.	Nation	Player
13	DF	DEN	Oliver Olsen (from (Denmark) Randers FC)
16	FW	NIR	Callum Marshall (on loan from (England) West Ham United)
18	DF	NOR	Mikkel Rakneberg (from (Norway) Kristiansund BK)
31	MF	GER	Marcel Sobottka (free agent)
—	MF	GER	Moritz Göttlicher (from Bayern Munich)

Out:

No.	Pos.	Nation	Player
5	DF	GER	Colin Kleine-Bekel (on loan to (Switzerland) FC St. Gallen)
6	MF	MLI	Ibrahima Sissoko (to (France) FC Nantes)
10	FW	IRL	Michael Obafemi (loan return to (England) Burnley)
14	FW	FRA	Mathis Clairicia (on loan to (Portugal) Alverca)
15	DF	GER	Felix Passlack (to (Scotland) Hibernian)
36	FW	KOS	Lirim Jashari (on loan to (Netherlands) MVV Maastricht)
