= Kacper Kościerski =

German footballer

Personal information
- Date of birth: 23 June 2007 (age 19)
- Place of birth: Aachen, Germany
- Height: 1.79 m (5 ft 10 in)
- Position: Right-back

Team information
- Current team: Alemannia Aachen (on loan from VfL Bochum)
- Number: 29

Youth career
- 2012–2017: SV Höntrop
- 2017–2025: VfL Bochum

Senior career*
Years	Team	Apps	(Gls)
2025–	VfL Bochum	12	(0)
2026–	→ Alemannia Aachen (loan)	0	(0)

International career^{‡}
2022	Germany U16	1	(0)
2023–2024	Germany U17	3	(0)
2024–2025	Germany U18	4	(0)
2025–	Germany U19	11	(0)
Medal record
Men's football
Representing Germany
UEFA European Under-19 Championship
Runner-up	2026 Wales
- * Club domestic league appearances and goals as of 18 May 2026 ‡ National team caps and goals as of 21:00, 4 July 2026 (UTC)

Kacper Kościerski (Polish pronunciation: [ˈkat͡spɛr kɔɕˈt͡ɕɛrskʲi]; born 23 June 2007) is a German professional footballer who plays as a right-back for 3. Liga club Alemannia Aachen, on loan from VfL Bochum.

== Club career ==
Kościerski is a youth product of SV Höntrop, before moving to the youth academy of Bochum in 2017. On 30 October 2023, he signed his first professional contract with Bochum. On 1 April 2025, he signed another long-term contract with the club. He made his senior and professional debut with Bochum in a 2–0 Bundesliga win over FC St. Pauli on 17 May 2025.

== International career ==
Born in Germany, Kościerski is of Polish descent. He is a youth product of Germany, having played up to the Germany U18s in 2024.

== Career statistics ==
As of match played 9 May 2026

Appearances and goals by club, season and competition
Club	Season	League			DFB-Pokal		Other		Total	
Club	Season	Division	Apps	Goals	Apps	Goals	Apps	Goals	Apps	Goals
VfL Bochum	2024–25	Bundesliga	1	0	0	0	—		1	0
VfL Bochum	2025–26	2. Bundesliga	11	0	2	0	—		13	0
VfL Bochum	Total		12	0	2	0	—		14	0
VfL Bochum II	2025–26	Regionalliga West	10	0	—		—		10	0
Career total			22	0	2	0	0	0	24	0

== Honours ==
Germany U19

- UEFA European Under-19 Championship runner-up: 2026
