= Francis Onyeka =

German footballer (born 2007)

Personal information
- Full name: Francis-Ikechukwu Onyeka
- Date of birth: 29 April 2007 (age 19)
- Place of birth: Gummersbach, Germany
- Height: 1.87 m (6 ft 2 in)
- Position: Attacking midfielder

Team information
- Current team: SV Elversberg (on loan from Bayer Leverkusen)
- Number: 40

Youth career
- SC Borussia Lindenthal-Hohenlind
- 2014–2024: Bayer Leverkusen

Senior career*
Years	Team	Apps	(Gls)
2024–	Bayer Leverkusen	0	(0)
2025–2026	→ VfL Bochum (loan)	30	(8)
2026–	→ SV Elversberg (loan)	6	(1)

International career^{‡}
2022	Germany U15	2	(0)
2022–2023	Germany U16	8	(2)
2023–2024	Germany U17	9	(6)
2024–2025	Germany U18	7	(3)
2025–	Germany U19	14	(14)
2026–	Germany U21	2	(0)
Medal record
Men's football
Representing Germany
UEFA European Under-19 Championship
Runner-up	2026 Wales
- * Club domestic league appearances and goals as of 22:30, 30 October 2026 (UTC) ‡ National team caps and goals as of 21:15, 30 September 2026 (UTC)

Francis-Ikechukwu Onyeka (German pronunciation: [ˈfʁaŋsɪs oˈnjɛka]; born 29 April 2007) is a German professional footballer who plays as an attacking midfielder for Bundesliga club SV Elversberg, on loan from Bayer Leverkusen.

== Club career ==
=== Bayer Leverkusen ===
Onyeka is a youth product of SC Borussia Lindenthal-Hohenlind, before moving to the youth academy of Bayer Leverkusen in 2014 where he finished his development. On 29 November 2023, he signed a professional contract with Bayer Leverkusen. On 15 October 2024, he was named by English newspaper The Guardian as one of the best players born in 2007 worldwide. On 18 October 2024, he won the 2024 U17 Fritz Walter Medal. He made his senior and professional debut with Bayer Leverkusen as a substitute in a 3–0 DFB-Pokal win over SV Elversberg on 29 October 2024.

==== Loan to VfL Bochum ====
On 3 June 2025, Onyeka agreed to join 2. Bundesliga club VfL Bochum, on loan for the 2025–26 season.

==== Loan to SV Elversberg ====
On 15 June 2026, Onyeka moved on a new loan to newly Bundesliga promoted club SV Elversberg.

== International career ==
Born in Germany, Onyeka is of Igbo Nigerian descent through his father. He is a youth international for Germany, having played for the Germany U17s for 2024 UEFA European Under-17 Championship qualification matches.

== Career statistics ==
As of match played 30 October 2026

Appearances and goals by club, season and competition
Club	Season	League			DFB-Pokal		Europe		Other		Total	
Club	Season	Division	Apps	Goals	Apps	Goals	Apps	Goals	Apps	Goals	Apps	Goals
Bayer Leverkusen	2024–25	Bundesliga	0	0	1	0	1 (Note: Appearance in UEFA Champions League)	0	0	0	2	0
VfL Bochum (loan)	2025–26	2. Bundesliga	29	8	2	0	—		—		31	8
SV Elversberg (loan)	2026–27	Bundesliga	6	1	2	2	—		—		8	3
Career total			35	9	5	2	1	0	0	0	41	11

== Honours ==
Germany U19

- UEFA European Under-19 Championship runner-up: 2026

Individual

- Fritz Walter Medal: U17 Gold 2024, U19 Gold 2026
