= Colin Kleine-Bekel =

German footballer (born 2003)

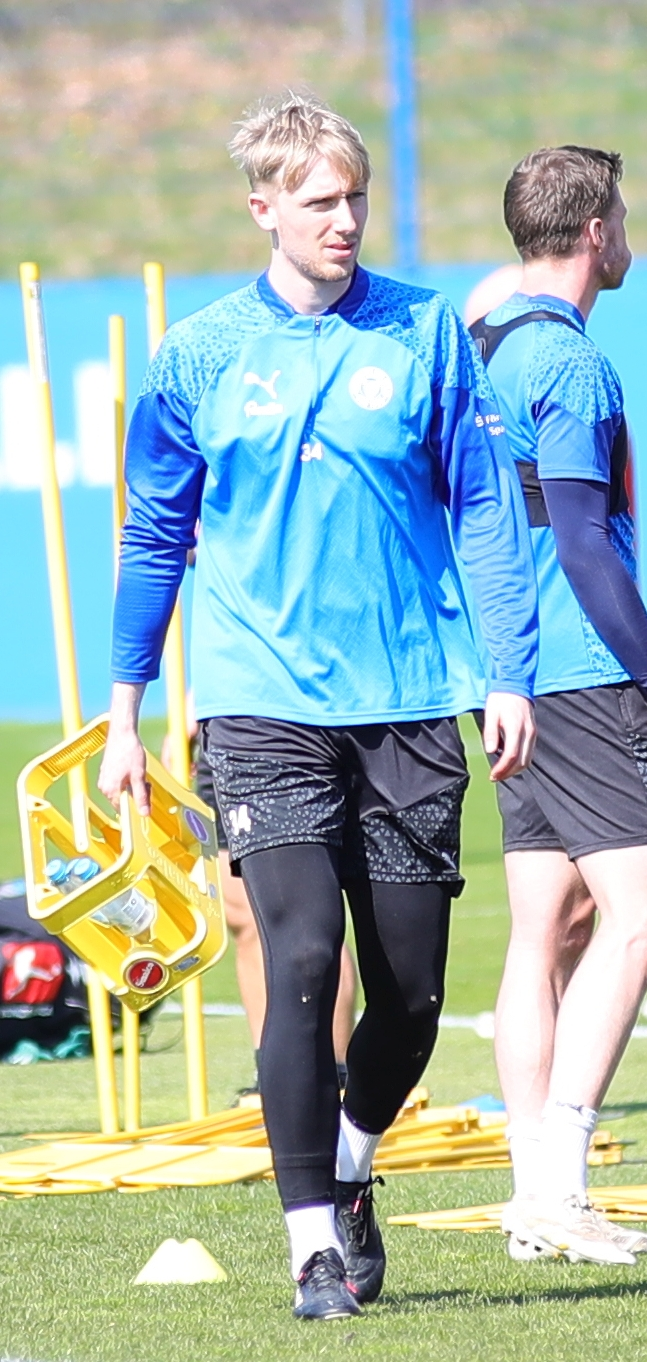
- Kleine-Bekel in 2025

Personal information
- Full name: Colin Noah Kleine-Bekel
- Date of birth: 24 January 2003 (age 23)
- Place of birth: Bielefeld, Germany
- Height: 1.91 m (6 ft 3 in)
- Position: Centre-back

Team information
- Current team: St. Gallen (on loan from VfL Bochum)
- Number: 3

Youth career
- VfR Wellensiek
- –2015: Arminia Bielefeld
- 2015–2022: Borussia Dortmund

Senior career*
Years	Team	Apps	(Gls)
2022–2024	Holstein Kiel II	34	(0)
2023–2025	Holstein Kiel	25	(0)
2025–	VfL Bochum	1	(0)
2026–	→ St. Gallen (loan)	21	(1)

International career^{‡}
2018	Germany U16	1	(0)
2023–2024	Germany U21	5	(1)
- * Club domestic league appearances and goals as of 28 September 2026 ‡ National team caps and goals as of 19:54, 22 March 2024 (UTC)

Colin Noah Kleine-Bekel (born 24 January 2003) is a German professional footballer who plays as a centre-back for Swiss Super League club St. Gallen, on loan from 2. Bundesliga club VfL Bochum.

== Career ==
Kleine-Bekel was born in Bielefeld. He was an important player and vice-captain of the Borussia Dortmund U19 team that won the Under 19 Bundesliga in the 2021–22 season. He also made eight appearances in the UEFA Youth League.

In summer 2022, Kleine-Bekel left Borussia Dortmund after spending seven years with the club, signing for 2. Bundesliga club Holstein Kiel. At Holstein Kiel, he was assigned to the reserve team for the 2022–23 season during which he was an undisputed starter and helped the side avoid relegation from the Regionalliga Nord. He made his debut for the first team in May 2023, on the last day of the season, coming on as a substitute in the 80th minute of a 5–1 win against Hannover 96.

Following strong performances in pre-season, Kleine-Bekel was promoted to the first team for the 2023–24 season. He made his starting debut in Holstein Kiel's first league match of the season, playing alongside Carl Johansson in a 1–0 win against Eintracht Braunschweig. In March 2024, he suffered a cruciate ligament injury that ruled him out for the entire 2024–25 Bundesliga season following his club's promotion.

On 30 May 2025, Kleine-Bekel signed a contract with VfL Bochum until 2028. In January 2026, he joined Swiss Super League club St. Gallen on loan until the end of the season. On 9 June 2026, Kleine-Bekel extended his contract with VfL Bochum until 2029 and returned to St. Gallen on another season-long loan.

== Style of play ==
A left-footed centre-back, Kleine-Bekel has been described as "tactically disciplined" and strong in duels on the ground and in the air. His build-up play is focussed on minimising mistakes.

== Career statistics ==
As of match played 23 August 2025

Appearances and goals by club, season and competition
Club	Season	League			DFB-Pokal		Total	
Club	Season	Division	Apps	Goals	Apps	Goals	Apps	Goals
Holstein Kiel II	2022–23	Regionalliga Nord	34	0	–		34	0
Holstein Kiel	2022–23	2. Bundesliga	1	0	0	0	1	0
Holstein Kiel	2023–24	2. Bundesliga	24	0	2	0	26	0
Holstein Kiel	2024–25	Bundesliga	0	0	0	0	0	0
Holstein Kiel	Total		25	0	2	0	27	0
VfL Bochum	2025–26	2. Bundesliga	1	0	0	0	1	0
Career total			60	0	2	0	62	0
