= Farid Alfa-Ruprecht =

German footballer (born 2006)

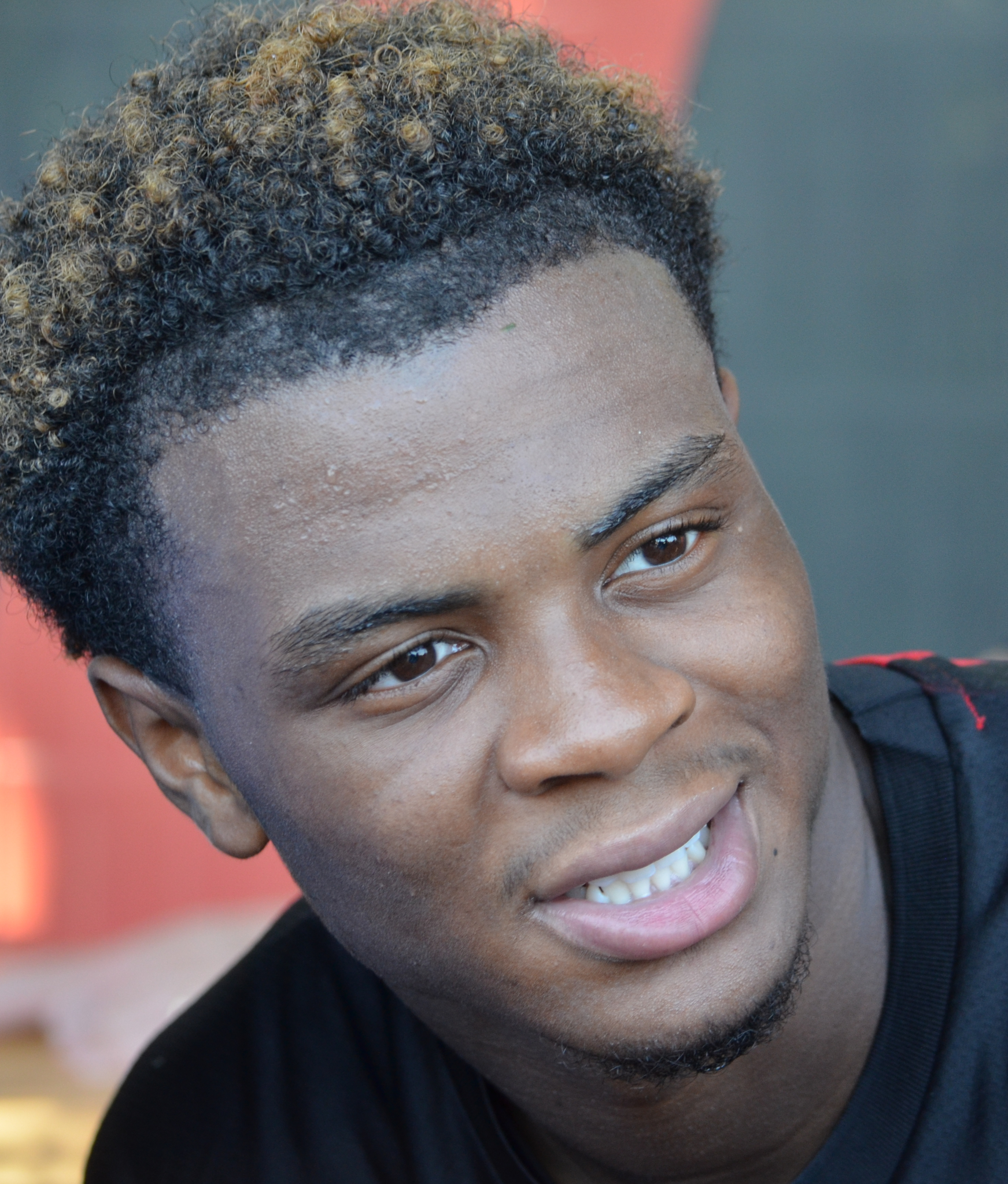

Personal information
- Date of birth: 28 March 2006 (age 20)
- Place of birth: Hamburg, Germany
- Height: 1.81 m (5 ft 11 in)
- Position: Winger

Team information
- Current team: Hertha BSC (on loan from Bayer Leverkusen)
- Number: 20

Youth career
- –2017: Einigkeit Wilhelmsburg
- 2017–2022: Hamburger SV
- 2022–2024: Manchester City

Senior career*
Years	Team	Apps	(Gls)
2024–2025	Manchester City	0	(0)
2025–	Bayer Leverkusen	0	(0)
2025–2026	→ VfL Bochum (loan)	26	(3)
2026–	→ Hertha BSC (loan)	9	(1)

International career^{‡}
2021	Germany U16	2	(0)
2022	Germany U17	2	(0)
2024	Germany U18	4	(1)
2025–	Germany U20	4	(0)
- * Club domestic league appearances and goals as of 18 May 2026 ‡ National team caps and goals as of 31 March 2026

Farid Alfa-Ruprecht (born 28 March 2006) is a German professional footballer who plays as a winger for 2. Bundesliga club Hertha BSC, on loan from Bayer Leverkusen.

== Club career ==
As a youth player, Alfa-Ruprecht joined Hamburg-based club Einigkeit Wilhelmsburg. At the age of ten, he joined the youth academy of Bundesliga side Hamburger SV. Five years later, he joined the youth academy of English Premier League side Manchester City. During the summer of 2022, he was promoted to the club's reserve team from their under-18 team.

=== Bayer Leverkusen ===
On 27 July 2025, Bayer Leverkusen announced the signing of Alfa-Ruprecht in a deal worth up to £5 million. He signed a five-year contract.

==== Loan to VfL Bochum ====
On 1 September 2025, he was loaned to VfL Bochum in the 2. Bundesliga, for the 2025–26 season.

==== Loan to Hertha BSC ====
On 20 August 2026, Alfa-Ruprecht returned to the 2. Bundesliga to join Hertha BSC, on loan for the 2026–27 season.

== International career ==
Born in Germany, Alfa-Ruprecht is of Ghanaian descent. He played for the Germany national under-17 football team for 2023 UEFA European Under-17 Championship qualification.

== Style of play ==
Alfa-Ruprecht plays as a winger and is right-footed. Overall, he is known for his speed and dribbling ability.

== Career statistics ==
As of match played 9 May 2026

Appearances and goals by club, season and competition
Club	Season	League			National cup		Europe		Other		Total	
Club	Season	Division	Apps	Goals	Apps	Goals	Apps	Goals	Apps	Goals	Apps	Goals
Manchester City U23	2023–24	—			—		—		3 (Note: Appearances in EFL Trophy)	0	3	0
Manchester City U23	2024–25	—			—		—		2	0	2	0
Manchester City U23	Total		—		—		—		5	0	5	0
Manchester City	2024–25	Premier League	0	0	0	0	0	0	0	0	0	0
Bayer Leverkusen	2025–26	Bundesliga	0	0	0	0	0	0	—		0	0
VfL Bochum (loan)	2025–26	2. Bundesliga	26	3	2	0	—		—		27	3
Hertha BSC (loan)	2026-27	2. Bundesliga	9	1	2	0	—		—		11	1
Career total			35	2	2	0	0	0	5	0	37	4

== Honours ==
Manchester City U18

- FA Youth Cup: 2023–24
