= Mats Pannewig =

German footballer

Personal information
- Full name: Mats Henry Pannewig
- Date of birth: 28 October 2004 (age 22)
- Place of birth: Hamm, Germany
- Height: 1.95 m (6 ft 5 in)
- Position: Midfielder

Team information
- Current team: VfL Bochum
- Number: 24

Youth career
- 2010–2013: Hammer SC 08
- 2013–2015: Westfalia Rhynern
- 2015–2021: FC Schalke 04
- 2021–2023: VfL Bochum

Senior career*
Years	Team	Apps	(Gls)
2022–	VfL Bochum	41	(1)
2024	→ SC Wiedenbrück (loan)	11	(4)
- * Club domestic league appearances and goals as of 28 August 2026

Mats Henry Pannewig (born 28 October 2004) is a German professional footballer who plays as a midfielder for VfL Bochum.

== Career statistics ==
As of match played 28 August 2026

Appearances and goals by club, season and competition
Club	Season	League			National Cup (Note: Includes DFB-Pokal)		Other		Total	
Club	Season	Division	Apps	Goals	Apps	Goals	Apps	Goals	Apps	Goals
VfL Bochum	2021–22	Bundesliga	0	0	0	0	—		0	0
VfL Bochum	2022–23	Bundesliga	0	0	0	0	—		0	0
VfL Bochum	2023–24	Bundesliga	0	0	0	0	0 (Note: Appearances in Relegation Playoffs)	0	0	0
VfL Bochum	2024–25	Bundesliga	11	0	0	0	—		11	0
VfL Bochum	2025–26	2. Bundesliga	27	1	3	0	—		30	1
VfL Bochum	2026–27	2. Bundesliga	3	0	1	0	—		4	0
VfL Bochum	Total		41	1	4	0	0	0	45	1
SC Wiedenbrück (loan)	2023–24	Regionalliga West	11	4	—		—		11	4
Career total			52	5	4	0	0	0	56	5
