= Gerrit Holtmann =

Filipino footballer (born 1995)

Personal information
- Full name: Gerrit Stephan Barba Holtmann
- Date of birth: 25 March 1995 (age 31)
- Place of birth: Bremen, Germany
- Height: 1.83 m (6 ft 0 in)
- Position: Winger

Team information
- Current team: VfL Bochum
- Number: 17

Youth career
- FC Sparta Bremerhaven
- Leher TS Bremerhaven
- –2010: OSC Bremerhaven
- 2010–2013: Werder Bremen
- 2013–2014: JFV Bremerhaven

Senior career*
Years	Team	Apps	(Gls)
2014–2015	Eintracht Braunschweig II	29	(11)
2015–2016	Eintracht Braunschweig	31	(4)
2016–2020	Mainz 05	26	(2)
2016–2020	→ Mainz 05 II	9	(0)
2019–2020	→ Paderborn 07 (loan)	24	(1)
2020–	VfL Bochum	133	(15)
2023–2024	→ Antalyaspor (loan)	7	(0)
2024	→ Darmstadt 98 (loan)	10	(0)

International career^{‡}
2015	Germany U20	5	(0)
2022–	Philippines	7	(2)
- * Club domestic league appearances and goals as of 14 August 2026 ‡ National team caps and goals as of 14 October 2025

Gerrit Stephan Barba Holtmann (born 25 March 1995) is a professional footballer who plays as a winger for 2.Bundesliga club VfL Bochum. Born in Germany, he plays for the Philippines national team.

== Club career ==
=== Youth ===
Holtmann played in Bremerhaven for Sparta Bremerhaven, Leher Turnerschaft and OSC Bremerhaven before he joined Werder Bremen's youth academy. In 2013 he joined JFV Bremerhaven.

=== Eintracht Braunschweig ===
Holtmann joined the reserve side of Eintracht Braunschweig in the Regionalliga Nord in 2014. On the 30th matchday of the 2014–15 2. Bundesliga season, he made his professional debut for Eintracht's senior side in a match against FC Erzgebirge Aue.

=== Mainz 05 ===
In June 2016, Holtmann transferred to 1. FSV Mainz 05. On 2 December 2017, he scored his first Bundesliga goal for Mainz in a 3–1 home defeat against FC Augsburg.

==== Loan to SC Paderborn ====
On 27 June 2019, he joined Paderborn 07 on loan for the 2019–20 season. At the end of the season, Paderborn relegated to the 2. Bundesliga.

=== VfL Bochum ===
Holtmann joined VfL Bochum on a three-year contract in August 2020. In January 2022, Holtmann was awarded the 2021 German Goal of the Year for a solo effort he made during a 2–0 home win against 1. FSV Mainz 05.

==== Loans to Antalyaspor and Darmstadt ====
On 5 August 2023, Holtmann moved on a season-long loan to Antalyaspor in Turkey, with an option to buy.

On 21 January 2024, Holtmann moved on a new loan to Darmstadt 98.

== International career ==
Due to Holtmann being born in Germany and the heritage of his parents (his mother is Filipino), he is eligible to play for Germany and the Philippines.

=== Germany youth ===
On 7 October 2015, Holtmann made his debut for the German national U-20 team in a match against Turkey.

=== Philippines ===
Holtmann decided to suit up for the Philippines around 2016, but wanted to become a regular player in the Bundesliga first.

In March 2021, during an interview, Holtmann said that he was applying for dual citizenship so he would be able to play for the Philippines in their remaining matches in the second round of 2022 FIFA World Cup Asian qualifiers that would be held in China. Two months later in May, he was called up by the Philippines for 2022 FIFA World Cup qualification matches against China, Guam and the Maldives. However, Holtmann was unable to make his Philippines debut in the said tournaments due to "a lack of documents."

Holtmann was included in the 25-man squad of the Philippines for 2022 FAS Tri-Nations Series. However, he was not able to play as he contracted COVID-19 while preparing to fly out to Singapore. In June, however, Holtmann finally got called up to the Philippines squad for the Asian Cup Qualifiers under coach Thomas Dooley. Holtmann made his debut for the Philippines in a match against Mongolia in the third round of the 2023 AFC Asian Cup qualifiers, featuring in the starting lineup. He would go on to score his first goal for the Philippines and the only goal of the game in the 93rd minute to win the match, 1–0.

== Career statistics ==
=== Club ===
As of match played 28 August 2026

Appearances and goals by club, season and competition
Club	Season	League			National cup (Note: Includes DFB-Pokal, Turkish Cup)		Continental		Total	
Club	Season	Division	Apps	Goals	Apps	Goals	Apps	Goals	Apps	Goals
Eintracht Braunschweig II	2014–15	Regionalliga Nord	27	10	—		—		27	10
Eintracht Braunschweig II	2015–16	Regionalliga Nord	2	1	—		—		2	1
Eintracht Braunschweig II	Total		29	11	—		—		29	11
Eintracht Braunschweig	2014–15	2. Bundesliga	1	0	0	0	—		1	0
Eintracht Braunschweig	2015–16	2. Bundesliga	30	4	2	2	—		32	6
Eintracht Braunschweig	Total		31	4	2	2	—		33	6
Mainz 05	2016–17	Bundesliga	5	0	0	0	1 (Note: Appearance in UEFA Europa League)	0	6	0
Mainz 05	2017–18	Bundesliga	17	2	1	0	—		18	2
Mainz 05	2018–19	Bundesliga	4	0	1	0	—		5	0
Mainz 05	Total		26	2	2	0	1	0	29	2
Mainz 05 II	2016–17	3. Liga	6	0	—		—		6	0
Mainz 05 II	2017–18	Regionalliga Südwest	1	0	—		—		1	0
Mainz 05 II	2018–19	Regionalliga Südwest	2	0	—		—		2	0
Mainz 05 II	Total		9	0	—		—		9	0
SC Paderborn (loan)	2019–20	Bundesliga	24	1	2	0	—		26	1
VfL Bochum	2020–21	2. Bundesliga	30	4	3	1	—		33	5
VfL Bochum	2021–22	Bundesliga	29	5	4	0	—		33	5
VfL Bochum	2022–23	Bundesliga	23	1	3	0	—		26	1
VfL Bochum	2024–25	Bundesliga	23	1	0	0	—		23	1
VfL Bochum	Total		105	11	11	1	—		116	12
Antalyaspor (loan)	2023–24	Süper Lig	7	0	1	0	—		8	0
Darmstadt 98 (loan)	2023–24	Bundesliga	10	0	—		—		10	0
VfL Bochum	2025–26	2. Bundesliga	24	5	2	1	—		26	6
VfL Bochum	2026–27	2. Bundesliga	3	0	0	0	—		3	0
VfL Bochum	Total		27	5	2	1	—		29	6
Career total			268	34	19	4	1	0	288	38

=== International ===
As of match played 14 October 2025

Appearances and goals by national team and year
National team	Year	Apps	Goals
Philippines	2022	2	1
Philippines	2023	0	0
Philippines	2024	3	1
Philippines	2025	2	0
Total		7	2

Scores and results list the Philippines' goal tally first, score column indicates score after each Holtmann goal.

List of international goals scored by Gerrit Holtmann
No.	Date	Venue	Opponent	Score	Result	Competition
1	11 June 2022	MFF Football Centre, Ulaanbaatar, Mongolia	Mongolia	1–0	1–0	2023 AFC Asian Cup qualification
2	14 October 2024	Tinsulanon Stadium, Songkhla, Thailand	Tajikistan	1–0	3–0	2024 King's Cup

== Honours ==
VfL Bochum

- 2. Bundesliga: 2020–21

Individual

- Bundesliga Goal of the Month: August 2021
- Bundesliga Goal of the Season: 2021–22
