= Darnell Keumo =

German footballer

Personal information
- Full name: Owono-Darnell Keumo
- Date of birth: 1 October 2007 (age 19)
- Place of birth: Essen, Germany
- Height: 1.72 m (5 ft 8 in)
- Position: Defender

Team information
- Current team: Waldhof Mannheim (on loan from VfL Bochum)
- Number: 17

Youth career
- –2019: Essener SG 99/06
- 2019–2026: VfL Bochum

Senior career*
Years	Team	Apps	(Gls)
2025–	VfL Bochum	2	(0)
2025–	VfL Bochum II	16	(1)
2026–	→ Waldhof Mannheim (loan)	0	(0)

International career^{‡}
2022–2023	Germany U16	6	(0)
2023–2024	Germany U17	11	(0)
2024–2025	Germany U18	4	(0)
- * Club domestic league appearances and goals as of 1 August 2026 ‡ National team caps and goals as of 14 May 2025

Owono-Darnell Keumo (born 1 October 2007) is a German professional footballer who plays as a defender for 3. Liga club Waldhof Mannheim, on loan from VfL Bochum.

== Club career ==
Keumo started his youth career at the Essener SG 99/06 and joined Bochum in 2019. He signed his first professional contract on 23 June 2025 and made his 2. Bundesliga debut for the club on 30 August 2025 against Preußen Münster the fourth league game of the 2025–26 season being substituted on in the 76th minute for Kjell Wätjen.

== International career ==
Keumo first played for Germany at U16 level in 2022.

== Career statistics ==
As of match played 30 August 2025

Appearances and goals by club, season and competition
Club	Season	League			Cup		Other		Total	
Club	Season	Division	Apps	Goals	Apps	Goals	Apps	Goals	Apps	Goals
VfL Bochum	2025–26	2. Bundesliga	1	0	0	0	—		1	0
VfL Bochum	Total		1	0	0	0	—		1	0
Career total			1	0	0	0	0	0	1	0
