= 2024–25 VfL Bochum season =

VfL Bochum
2024–25 season
- Chairman: Hans-Peter Villis
- Head coach: Peter Zeidler (until 20 October); Dieter Hecking (from 4 November)
- Stadium: Vonovia-Ruhrstadion
- Bundesliga: 18th (relegated)
- DFB-Pokal: First round
- Average home league attendance: 25,540

The 2024–25 season was the 87th season in the history of VfL Bochum, and the club's fourth consecutive season in the Bundesliga. In addition to the domestic league, the club participated in the DFB-Pokal.

VfL Bochum were relegated from the Bundesliga on 10 May, following a 4–1 home loss to Mainz 05. The relegation brought an end to the club's four-season spell in the top flight.

== Transfers ==
=== In ===
Pos.	Player	Transferred from	Fee	Date	Source
GK	(Germany) Paul Grave	(Germany) Wuppertaler SV	Loan return	30 June 2024	
FW	(Germany) Samuel Bamba	(Germany) Borussia Dortmund	Free	1 July 2024	
GK	(Germany) Patrick Drewes	(Germany) Karlsruher SC	Undisclosed	1 July 2024	
MF	(Mali) Ibrahima Sissoko	(France) Strasbourg	Free	1 July 2024	
MF	(Netherlands) Dani de Wit	(Netherlands) AZ	Free	3 July 2024	
GK	(Germany) Timo Horn	(Austria) Red Bull Salzburg	Free	2 August 2024	

=== Out ===
Pos.	Player	Transferred to	Fee	Date	Source
DF	(Ukraine) Ivan Ordets	(Russia) Dynamo Moscow	Loan return	30 June 2024	
FW	(Portugal) Gonçalo Paciência	(Spain) Celta Vigo	Loan return	30 June 2024	
MF	(Germany) Keven Schlotterbeck	(Germany) SC Freiburg	Loan return	30 June 2024	
MF	(Germany) Patrick Osterhage	(Germany) SC Freiburg		1 July 2024	
MF	(Austria) Kevin Stöger	(Germany) Borussia Mönchengladbach	End of contract	1 July 2024	
FW	(Japan) Takuma Asano	(Spain) Mallorca	End of contract	1 July 2024	
GK	(Germany) Michael Esser		End of contract	1 July 2024	
MF	(Germany) Philipp Förster		End of contract	1 July 2024	
DF	(Germany) Moritz Römling	(Austria) Kapfenberger SV	End of contract	1 July 2024	
GK	(Germany) Andreas Luthe		Retired	1 July 2024	
FW	(Germany) Mohammad Mahmoud	(Germany) SV Elversberg		1 July 2024	
DF	(Brazil) Danilo Soares	(Germany) 1. FC Nürnberg	End of contract	1 July 2024	

== Friendlies ==
6 July 2024 Friendly	Rot Weiss Ahlen	1–3	VfL Bochum	Ahlen
14:00 CEST (UTC+2)	Sezer 83'	Report	Elezi 27' (pen.); Osei-Tutu 87'; Broschinski 90' (pen.)	Stadium: Wersestadion; Attendance: 3,078

10 July 2024 Friendly	SSVg Velbert	1–5	VfL Bochum	Velbert
18:30 CEST (UTC+2)	De Stefano 33'	Report	Pannewig 35'; Loosli 50'; Sissoko 70'; Elezi 72'; Hofmann 76'	Stadium: IMS Arena; Attendance: 2,000; Referee: Robin Braun

12 July 2024 Friendly	Alemannia Aachen	0–1	VfL Bochum	Aachen
19:00 CEST (UTC+2)		Report	De Wit 38'; Mašović (yellow card) 83'; Pannewig (yellow card) 87'; Bamba (yellow card) 90'	Stadium: Tivoli; Attendance: 7,600; Referee: Nico Fuchs

20 July 2024 Friendly	1. FC Magdeburg	1–1	VfL Bochum	Magdeburg
14:00 CEST (UTC+2)	Kaars 30'	Report	Broschinski 7'	Stadium: Avnet Arena; Attendance: 5,554; Referee: Eric Weisbach

30 July 2024 Friendly	Spezia	3–1	VfL Bochum	Brixen, Italy
18:00 CEST (UTC+2)	Di Serio 11'; Esposito 82'; Sissoko 90+1' (o.g.)	Report	Bernardo 14'	Stadium: Raiffeisen Arena; Referee: Daniele Perenzoni (Italy)

3 August 2024 Friendly	Südtirol	2–0	VfL Bochum	Bolzano, Italy
17:00 CEST (UTC+2)	Martini 14'; Crespi 59'	Report		Stadium: Stadio Druso; Referee: David Kovacevic (Italy)
Note: The match was played in two periods of thirty minutes each.

3 August 2024 Friendly	VfL Bochum	4–0	Bologna	Bolzano, Italy
18:15 CEST (UTC+2)	Sissoko 6'; Broschinski 9', 49'; De Wit 54'	Report		Stadium: Stadio Druso; Referee: Andrea Copelli (Italy)
Note: The match was played in two periods of thirty minutes each.

10 August 2024 Friendly	Le Havre	0–6	VfL Bochum
18:00

5 September 2024 Friendly	VfL Bochum	3–1	Rot-Weiss Essen
14:00 CEST (UTC+2)

10 October 2024 Friendly	1. FC Köln	2–2	VfL Bochum
13:00

14 November 2024 Friendly	VfL Bochum	2–0	FC Den Bosch
14:00

5 January 2025 Friendly	VfL Bochum	6–2	Wuppertaler SV
12:00

5 January 2025 Friendly	VfL Bochum	1–0	Heracles Almelo
15:00

20 March 2025 Friendly	VfL Bochum	4–2	SC Preußen Münster
14:00

== Competitions ==
=== Overall record ===
Competition	First match	Last match	Starting round	Final position	Record							
Competition	First match	Last match	Starting round	Final position	Pld	W	D	L	GF	GA	GD	Win %
Bundesliga	24 August 2024	17 May 2025	Matchday 1	18th	34	6	7	21	33	67	−34	17.65
DFB-Pokal	18 August 2024		First round	First round	1	0	0	1	0	1	−1	0.00
Total					35	6	7	22	33	68	−35	17.14

Source: Soccerway

=== Bundesliga ===
==== League table ====
Pos	Team	Pld	W	D	L	GF	GA	GD	Pts	Qualification or relegation
14	FC St. Pauli	34	8	8	18	28	41	−13	32	
15	TSG Hoffenheim	34	7	11	16	46	68	−22	32	
16	1. FC Heidenheim (O)	34	8	5	21	37	64	−27	29	Qualification for the relegation play-offs
17	Holstein Kiel (R)	34	6	7	21	49	80	−31	25	Relegation to 2. Bundesliga
18	VfL Bochum (R)	34	6	7	21	33	67	−34	25	Relegation to 2. Bundesliga

Source: Bundesliga
Rules for classification: 1) Points; 2) Goal difference; 3) Goals scored; 4) Head-to-head results; 5) Head-to-head away goals scored; 6) Away goals scored; 7) Play-off.
(Rules 4–6 only apply after home and away matches have been played between the tied teams.)
(O) Play-off winners; (R) Relegated

==== Results summary ====
Overall								Home						Away					
Pld	W	D	L	GF	GA	GD	Pts	W	D	L	GF	GA	GD	W	D	L	GF	GA	GD
34	6	7	21	33	67	−34	25	3	4	10	16	33	−17	3	3	11	17	34	−17

Source: DFB

==== Results by round ====
Round	1	2	3	4	5	6	7	8	9	10	11	12	13	14	15	16	17	18	19	20	21	22	23	24	25	26	27	28	29	30	31	32	33	34
Ground	A	H	A	H	A	H	A	H	A	H	A	A	H	A	H	A	H	H	A	H	A	H	A	H	A	H	A	H	H	A	H	A	H	A
Result	L	L	L	D	L	L	L	L	L	D	L	L	L	D	W	L	W	D	L	L	D	W	D	L	W									
Position	15	17	16	16	17	18	18	18	18	18	18	18	18	18	18	18	18	18	18	18	18	17	17	17	16									

Updated to match(es) played on 09 March 2025. Source: DFB
A = Away; H = Home; W = Win; D = Draw; L = Loss

==== Matches ====
The league schedule was released on 4 July 2024.

24 August 2024 1	RB Leipzig	1–0	VfL Bochum	Leipzig
15:30	Simons (yellow card) 35'; Nusa 59'; Orbán (red card) 85'	Report	Bero (yellow card) 15'; Wittek (yellow card) 23'; Sissoko (yellow card) 81'	Stadium: Red Bull Arena; Attendance: 44,611; Referee: Benjamin Brand

31 August 2024 2	VfL Bochum	0–2	Borussia Mönchengladbach	Bochum
15:30 CEST	Pannewig (yellow card) 89'	Report	Kleindienst 67'; Honorat 78'	Stadium: Ruhrstadion; Attendance: 26,000; Referee: Sören Storks

14 September 2024 3	SC Freiburg	2–1	VfL Bochum	Freiburg
15:30 CEST (UTC+2)	Adamu 58', 61'	Report	Boadu 45'; Balde (yellow card) 81'; Kwarteng (yellow card) 82'; Wittek (yellow card) 90+5'	Stadium: Europa-Park Stadion; Attendance: 34,100; Referee: Daniel Siebert

21 September 2024 4	VfL Bochum	2–2	Holstein Kiel	Bochum
15:30	Bero 22', (yellow card) 39', Dani de Wit (yellow card) 48'; Hofmann (yellow card) 76'; Passlack (yellow card) 78'; Daschner 35'	Report	Pichler 15'; Machino 89'; Knudsen (yellow card) 90+4'	Stadium: Vonovia Ruhrstadion; Attendance: 26.000; Referee: Martin Petersen

27 September 2024 5	Borussia Dortmund	4–2	VfL Bochum	Dortmund
20:30 CEST (UTC+2)	Guirassy 44', 75'; Couto (yellow card) 58'; Can 62' (pen.); Groß (yellow card) 70'; Nmecha 81'	Report	Bero 16'; De Wit 21'	Stadium: Signal Iduna Park; Attendance: 81,365; Referee: Felix Brych

6 September 2024 6	VfL Bochum	1–3	VFL Wolfsburg	Bochum
15:30	Medić (yellow card) 38'; Boadu 72'	Report	Tomás 21'; Wind 37', 88' (yellow card) 38'; Amoura (yellow card) 56'	Stadium: Vonovia Ruhrstadion; Attendance: 24,630; Referee: Max Burda

19 October 2024 7	TSG Hoffenheim	3–1	VfL Bochum	Sinsheim
15:30 CEST (UTC+2)	Kramarić 11'; Bülter 64', (yellow card) 82'; Tabaković 90+3'	Report	Mašović (yellow card) 55'; Gamboa 76'; Daschner (penalty missed) 89'	Stadium: Rhein-Neckar-Arena; Attendance: 19,281; Referee: Sören Storks

27 October 2024 8	VfL Bochum	0–5	Bayern Munich	Bochum
15:30 CET	Passlack (yellow card) 12'	Report	Olise 16'; Musiala 26', (yellow card) 45+1'; Kane 57'; Sané 65'; Coman 71'	Stadium: Vonovia Ruhrstadion; Attendance: 26,000; Referee: Florian Exner

2 November 2024 9	Eintracht Frankfurt	7–2	VfL Bochum	Frankfurt
15:30 CET (UTC+1)	Ekitike 9', 69'; Marmoush 18'; Knauff 20', (yellow card) 50'; Brown 32'; Dahoud 61'; Uzun 66'	Report	De Wit 35'; Ordets (yellow card) 38'; Hofmann 51', (yellow card) 77'	Stadium: Deutsche Bank Park; Attendance: 58,000; Referee: Daniel Schlager

9 November 2024 10	VfL Bochum	1–1	Bayer Leverkusen	Bochum
15:30 CET (UTC+1)	Miyoshi 89'	Report	Schick 18', (yellow card) 77'	Stadium: Ruhrstadion; Attendance: 26,000; Referee: Robert Hartmann

23 November 2024 11	VfB Stuttgart	2–0	VfL Bochum	Stuttgart
15:30 CET (UTC+1)	Chabot (yellow card) 6'; Führich 53'; Millot (yellow card) 71'; Diehl 78'	Report	Sissoko (yellow card) 28'; Hofmann (yellow card) 72'; Bero (yellow card) 90'	Stadium: MHPArena; Attendance: 59,000; Referee: Benjamin Brand

30 November 2024 12	FC Augsburg	1–0	VfL Bochum	Augsburg
15:30 CET (UTC+1)	Claude-Maurice (yellow card) 17'; Wolf (yellow card) 26'; Tietz 38' (pen.); Mounié (yellow card) 82'	Report	Wittek (yellow card) 68'; Ordets (yellow card) 72'; Bernardo (yellow card) 83'	Stadium: WWK Arena; Attendance: 29,556; Referee: Tobias Reichel

7 December 2024 13	VfL Bochum	0–1	Werder Bremen	Bochum
18:30 CEST (UTC+1)	Wittek (yellow card) 29'	Report	Lynen (yellow card) 27'; Stage 56'	Stadium: Vonovia-Ruhrstadion; Attendance: 26,000; Referee: Felix Brych

14 December 2024 14	Union Berlin	1–1	VfL Bochum	Berlin
20:30	Hollerbach 37', (yellow card) 37'; Vogt (yellow card) 67'	Report	Miyoshi (red card) 13'; Sissoko 23'; Broschinski (yellow card) 50'; Drewes (yellow card) 90+1'	Stadium: Stadion An der Alten Försterei; Attendance: 22,012; Referee: Martin Petersen

22 December 2024 15	VfL Bochum	2–0	1. FC Heidenheim	Bochum
15:30 CEST (UTC+1)	Broschinski 6'; Bernardo (yellow card) 22'; Bero 38', (yellow card) 54'	Report	Schöppner (yellow card) 30'; Wanner (yellow card) 35'; Pieringer (yellow card) 46'; Keller (yellow card) 50'; Kerber (yellow card) 73'; Siersleben (yellow card) 75'; Conteh (yellow card) 82'	Stadium: Vonovia-Ruhrstadion; Attendance: 24,328; Referee: Sven Jablonski

11 January 2024 16	Mainz 05	2–0	VfL Bochum	Mainz
15:30 CEST (UTC+1)	Burkardt 23', 69'	Report	Hofmann (yellow card) 33'; Sissoko (yellow card) 45+7'	Stadium: Mewa Arena; Attendance: 32,000; Referee: Benjamin Brand

14 January 2024 17	VfL Bochum	1–0	FC St. Pauli	Bochum
18:30 CEST (UTC+1)	Holtmann (yellow card) 42'; Hofmann 67'	Report	Smith (yellow card) 69'; Irvine (yellow card) 72'; Afolayan (yellow card) 79'; Dźwigała (red card) 90+4'	Stadium: Vonovia-Ruhrstadion; Attendance: 26,000; Referee: Daniel Siebert

18 January 2024 18	VfL Bochum	3–3	RB Leipzig	Bochum
15:30 CEST (UTC+1)	Bero (yellow card) 9'; Passlack (yellow card) 20'; Boadu 48', 56', 61' (pen.); Sissoko (yellow card) 69'; Ordets (yellow card) 90+2'	Report	Orban 10'; Nusa 13'; Baumgartner 22'	Stadium: Vonovia-Ruhrstadion; Attendance: 24,158; Referee: Robert Hartmann

25 January 2025 19	Borussia Mönchengladbach	3–0	VfL Bochum	Mönchengladbach
18:30 CEST (UTC+1)	Elvedi (yellow card) 26'; Reitz 34'; Hack 55'; Kleindienst 86'	Report	Passlack (yellow card) 57'; Holtmann (yellow card) 81'; Holtmann (yellow card) 85'; Hecking (yellow card) 85'	Stadium: Borussia-Park; Attendance: 54,042; Referee: Matthias Jöllenbeck

01 February 2025 20	VfL Bochum	0–1	SC Freiburg	Bochum
15:30 CEST (UTC+1)	Bero (yellow card) 42'; Bernardo (yellow card) 63'; Sissoko (yellow card) 84'	Report	Sildillia 34'; Atubolu (yellow card) 74'; Höfler (yellow card) 81'	Stadium: Vonovia-Ruhrstadion; Attendance: 25,900; Referee: Tobias Welz

09 February 2025 21	Holstein Kiel	2–2	VfL Bochum	Kiel
15:30 CEST (UTC+1)	Skrzybski 3' (pen.); Zec 50', (yellow card) 90+5'; Remberg (yellow card) 52'	Report	Boadu 37', 39'; Wittek (yellow card) 54'; Bero (yellow card) 68'	Stadium: Holstein-Stadion; Attendance: 15,034; Referee: Felix Zwayer

15 February 2025 22	VfL Bochum	2–0	Borussia Dortmund	Bochum
15:30 CET (UTC+1)	Masouras 33', 35'; Bernardo (yellow card) 49'	Report		Stadium: Vonovia Ruhrstadion; Attendance: 26,000; Referee: Harm Osmers

22 February 2025 23	VFL Wolfsburg	1–1	VfL Bochum	Wolfsburg
15:30 CEST (UTC+1)	Svanberg 81'; Wind (yellow card) 66'; Bornauw (yellow card) 86'	Report	Masovic 50'; Bero (yellow card) 7'; Ordets (yellow card) 72'; Wittek (yellow card) 90'	Stadium: Volkswagen Arena; Attendance: 23,772; Referee: Timo Gerach

1 March 2025 24	VfL Bochum	0–1	TSG Hoffenheim	Bochum
15:30 CEST (UTC+1)		Report	Stach (yellow card) 53'; Hölzl (yellow card) 67'; Bischof 72'	Stadium: Vonovia Ruhrstadion; Attendance: 24,120; Referee: Florian Badstübner

8 March 2025 25	Bayern Munich	2–3	VfL Bochum	Munich
15:30 CEST (UTC+1)	Guerreiro 14', 28'; Palhinha (red card) 43'	Report	Medic (yellow card) 21', (goal) 31'; Sissoko 51', (yellow card) 87'; Bernardo (yellow card) 57'; Bero 71'; Wittek (yellow card) 73'; Horn (yellow card) 80'; Losilla (yellow card) 90+4'	Stadium: Allianz Arena; Attendance: 75,000; Referee: Christian Dingert

16 March 2025 26	VfL Bochum	1–3	Eintracht Frankfurt	Bochum
15:30 CEST (UTC+1)	Krauß (yellow card) 24'; Holtmann 73'; Wittek (yellow card) 75'; Bero (yellow card) 85'; Sissoko (yellow card) 90+4'	Report	Kristensen 27'; Bahoya 32', (yellow card) 62'; Batshuayi 90+6'	Stadium: Vonovia Ruhrstadion; Attendance: 26,000; Referee: Felix Zwayer

28 March 2025 27	Bayer Leverkusen	3–1	VfL Bochum	Leverkusen
20:30 CEST (UTC+1)	García 20'; Boniface 60'; Simion (yellow card) 70'; Adli 87'	Report	Paslack 26'; Boadu (yellow card) 87'; Kruska (yellow card) 87'	Stadium: BayArena; Attendance: 30,210; Referee: Sven Jablonski

5 April 2025 28	VfL Bochum	0–4	VfB Stuttgart	Bochum

12 April 2025 29	VfL Bochum	1–2	FC Augsburg	Bochum

19 April 2025 30	Werder Bremen	1–0	Bochum	Bremen

27 April 2025 31	VfL Bochum	1–1	Union Berlin	Bochum

2 May 2025 32	1. FC Heidenheim	0–0	VfL Bochum	Heidenheim an der Brenz

10 May 2025 33	VfL Bochum	1–4	Mainz 05	Bochum

17 May 2025 34	St. Pauli	0–2	Bochum	Hamburg

=== DFB-Pokal ===
18 August 2024 First round	Jahn Regensburg	1–0	VfL Bochum	Regensburg
15:30 CEST (UTC+2)	Ballas 70'; Schönfelder (yellow card) 76'	Report	Loosli (yellow card) 41'; Daschner (yellow card) 53'; Hofmann (yellow card) 66'; Boadu (yellow card) 84'; Wittek (yellow card) 90+2'; Bero (yellow card) 90+5'	Stadium: Jahnstadion Regensburg; Attendance: 12,581; Referee: Florian Heft
