= Mathis Clairicia =

French footballer (born 2004)

Personal information
- Date of birth: 30 August 2002 (age 24)
- Place of birth: Châtenay-Malabry, France
- Height: 1.88 m (6 ft 2 in)
- Position: Forward

Team information
- Current team: Sochaux
- Number: 91

Youth career
- –2020: FC Fleury 91
- 2020–2021: Clermont Foot 63

Senior career*
| Years | Team | Apps | (Gls) |
| 2021–2022 | Clermont B | 21 | (8) |
| 2022–2024 | Thonon Evian | 52 | (4) |
| 2024–2025 | Châteauroux | 24 | (10) |
| 2025–2026 | VfL Bochum | 9 | (0) |
| 2025–2026 | VfL Bochum II | 2 | (0) |
| 2026 | → Alverca (loan) | 9 | (0) |
| 2026– | Sochaux | 0 | (0) |
- * Club domestic league appearances and goals as of 25 May 2026

Mathis Clairicia (born 30 August 2002) is a French professional footballer who plays as a forward for Ligue 2 club Sochaux.

== Early life ==
Clairicia was born on 30 August 2002 in Châtenay-Malabry, France Of Martiniquais and Malagasy descent through his parents, he is the younger brother of French footballer Evann Clairicia.

== Career ==
Clairicia started his career with French side Clermont Foot 63 B, where he made twenty-one league appearances and scored eight goals. Following his stint there, he signed for French side Thonon Evian Grand Genève FC in 2022, where he made fifty-two league appearances and scored four goals.

During the summer of 2024, he signed for French side LB Châteauroux, where he made twenty-four league appearances and scored ten goals. Ahead of the 2025–26 season, he signed for German side VfL Bochum.

On 15 January 2026, Clairicia was sent on loan to Portuguese Primeira Liga club Alverca until the end of the season.

On 25 June 2026, Clairicia returned to France and signed with Sochaux for two seasons, with an optional third.

== Style of play ==
Clairicia plays as a forward and is right-footed. Martiniquais news website Globallfoot wrote in 2025 that he "has established himself as an athletic and technical player, capable of weighing on opposing defenses".

== Career statistics ==
As of match played 25 October 2025

Appearances and goals by club, season and competition
| Club | Season | League | | | Cup | | Europe | | Other | | Total | |
| Club | Season | Division | Apps | Goals | Apps | Goals | Apps | Goals | Apps | Goals | Apps | Goals |
|---|---|---|---|---|---|---|---|---|---|---|---|---|
| Clermont B | 2020–21 | National 3 | 3 | 0 | — | | — | | — | | 3 | 0 |
| Clermont B | 2021–22 | National 3 | 21 | 8 | — | | — | | — | | 21 | 8 |
| Clermont B | Total | | 24 | 8 | — | | — | | — | | 24 | 8 |
| Clermont | 2021–22 | Ligue 1 | 0 | 0 | 1 | 0 | — | | — | | 1 | 0 |
| Evian | 2022–23 | CFA 2 | 29 | 2 | 0 | 0 | — | | — | | 29 | 2 |
| Evian | 2023–24 | CFA 2 | 23 | 2 | 3 | 1 | — | | — | | 26 | 3 |
| Evian | Total | | 52 | 4 | 3 | 1 | — | | — | | 55 | 5 |
| Châteauroux | 2024–25 | CFA | 24 | 10 | — | | — | | — | | 24 | 10 |
| Châteauroux B | 2024–25 | National 3 | 4 | 2 | — | | — | | — | | 4 | 2 |
| VfL Bochum | 2025–26 | 2. Bundesliga | 9 | 0 | 1 | 0 | — | | — | | 10 | 0 |
| Career total | | | 113 | 24 | 5 | 1 | 0 | 0 | 0 | 0 | 118 | 25 |
