= Kōji Miyoshi =

Japanese footballer (born 1997)

Koji Miyoshi 三好 康児
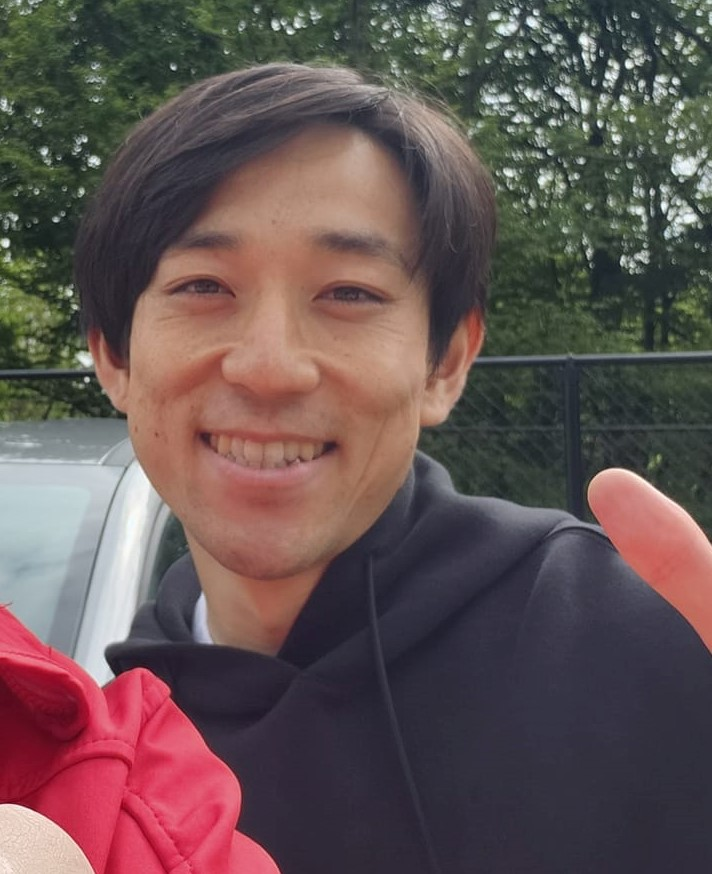
- Miyoshi in 2023

Personal information
- Full name: Koji Miyoshi
- Date of birth: 26 March 1997 (age 29)
- Place of birth: Tama-ku, Kawasaki, Japan
- Height: 1.67 m (5 ft 6 in)
- Positions: Attacking midfielder; winger

Team information
- Current team: VfL Bochum
- Number: 23

Youth career
- 2007–2014: Kawasaki Frontale

Senior career*
Years	Team	Apps	(Gls)
2015–2020	Kawasaki Frontale	31	(5)
2015	→ J. League U22 (loan)	8	(1)
2018	→ Hokkaido Consadole Sapporo (loan)	27	(3)
2019	→ Yokohama F. Marinos (loan)	19	(3)
2019–2020	→ Royal Antwerp (loan)	14	(1)
2020–2023	Royal Antwerp	58	(5)
2023–2024	Birmingham City	46	(6)
2024–	VfL Bochum	40	(6)

International career^{‡}
2013	Japan U17	3	(0)
2013–2015	Japan U18	9	(2)
2016	Japan U19	9	(3)
2017	Japan U20	5	(0)
2018	Japan U21	7	(3)
2018–2021	Japan U23	13	(2)
2019–	Japan	5	(2)
Medal record
Representing Japan
Asian Games
Silver medal – second place	2018 Jakarta-Palembang	Team
AFC U-19 Championship
Gold medal – first place	2016 Bahrain
AFC U-16 Championship
Silver medal – second place	2012 Iran
- * Club domestic league appearances and goals as of 6 Sep 2026 ‡ National team caps and goals as of 14:17, 8 May 2024 (UTC)

Koji Miyoshi (三好 康児, Miyoshi Kōji; born 26 March 1997) is a Japanese professional footballer who plays as an attacking midfielder or winger for 2. Bundesliga club VfL Bochum and the Japan national team. He previously played domestically for Kawasaki Frontale, from where he spent time on loan with the J.League U-22 Selection, Hokkaido Consadole Sapporo and Yokohama F. Marinos. He joined Belgian club Royal Antwerp, initially on loan, in 2019, and four years later joined English club Birmingham City, where he spent just over one season before signing for Bochum.

== Club career ==
=== Early career ===
Born in Kawasaki, Kanagawa, Miyoshi was introduced to football by his older brother in the first year of elementary school. Like him, his older brother was a footballer and his father was a football coach. His first club was at Nakanojima FC. Soon after, he joined the Kawasaki Frontale’s youth team at age 10. having been the only two out of the 300 participants to pass the exam. Miyoshi progressed through the youth team all way to the U18 side. Due to his "small stature and sharp movements", which was a reminiscent of Lionel Messi, he earned a nickname of "Miyessi".

In 2011, Miyoshi scored four times on two occasions in his first year at Kawasaki Frontale’s U18. Two years later, he scored three hat–tricks in his third year at Kawasaki Frontale’s U18. However towards the end of 2013, Miyoshi’s progress at Kawasaki Frontale’s U18 was interrupted when he suffered a knee injury that saw him sidelined for ten months. On 8 August 2014, it was announced that Miyoshi and Ko Itakura would be promoted to the Kawasaki Frontale’s senior team ahead of the 2015 season.

=== Kawasaki Frontale ===
Ahead of the 2015 season, Miyoshi was introduced to the Kawasaki Frontale’s first team at the club’s press conference and was given a number twenty–six shirt. On 4 April 2015, he made his debut for the club, coming on as a late substitute, in a 4–1 win against Albirex Niigata. After the match, Miyoshi said it was a dream come true to have made his professional debut. On 22 April 2015, he made his first start for Kawasaki Frontale and played 45 minutes before being substituted, in a 0–0 draw against Vissel Kobe in the J.League Cup. Miyoshi went on to make five more appearances for Kawasaki Frontale in the 2015 season.

After his time at J.League U-22 Selection ended, Miyoshi returned to the Kawasaki Frontale’s first team, coming on as a 83rd minute substitute, in a 0–0 draw against Yokohama F. Marinos in the group stage match of the J.League Cup. For the reminder of the J.League Cup matches, he went on to set up three times for the club, but fell short of finishing third place and was out of the tournament. On 2 July 2016, Miyoshi scored his first goal for Kawasaki Frontale, in a 3–0 win against Vegalta Sendai. After the match, his goal against Vegalta Sendai earned him a nomination for the league’s Goal of the Game. However in a match against Sagan Tosu on 13 August 2016, he came on as 79th minutes substitute, only to receive a straight red card five minutes later for kicking Kim Min-woo, as the club lost 1–0. After serving a one match suspension, Miyoshi scored on his return, in a 5–2 lost against Kashiwa Reysol on 27 August 2016. He later scored two more goals later in the 2016 season and against Yokohama F. Marinos and Gamba Osaka. Miyoshi started the whole game in the quarter finals of the Emperor’s Cup against Urawa Red Diamonds and successfully converted the penalty in a shootout, as the club won 4–2 to advance to the next round. He was part of the Kawasaki Frontale’s squad when the club lost twice against Kashima Antlers in the league’s Championship stage and the Emperor's Cup final (during the match, Miyoshi set up the equalising goal that sent the match to extra time and the match ended in a 2–1 lost for Kawasaki Frontale). At the end of the 2016 season, he made twenty–seven appearances and scoring four times in all competitions.

Ahead of the 2017 season, Miyoshi renewed his contract with Kawasaki Frontale. He also switched number shirt from twenty to thirteen following the departure of Yoshito Ōkubo. Miyoshi made his AFC Champions League debut, starting a match and played 68 minutes before being substituted, in a 1–1 draw against Suwon Samsung Bluewings. After being absent from the first team due to international commitments with Japan U20, he returned to the first team, starting the match and played 67 minutes before being substituted, in a 2–1 win against Tochigi City in the Emperor’s Cup on 21 June 2017. After a three month absent from the first team, Miyoshi made his return to the first team, coming on as a late substitute, in a 5–1 win against Cerezo Osaka on 30 September 2017. He then scored three goals throughout October, including a brace against Vegalta Sendai that send the club to the final of the J.League Cup. In the final against Cerezo Osaka, Miyoshi started the match and played 45 minutes before being substituted at half time, as Kawasaki Frontale lost 2–0. At the end of the 2017 season, he went on to make twenty appearances and scoring three times in all competitions. Despite playing less than the previous season, Miyoshi was among eleven players to be selected for the Tag Heuer Young Guns’ Award.

==== Loan Spells from Kawasaki Frontale ====
On 27 June 2015, Miyoshi was among several youngsters to join J.League U-22 Selection for the rest of the 2015 season. He played eight times for the J.League U-22 Selection, including scoring once against Fujieda MYFC on 25 October 2015.

On 26 December 2017, Miyoshi joined Hokkaido Consadole Sapporo on loan ahead of the 2018 season. Upon joining the club, he was given a number 41 shirt. He made his debut for the club, starting the whole game, in a 1–0 lost against Sanfrecce Hiroshima in the opening game of the season. Since joining Hokkaido Consadole Sapporo, Miyoshi became a first team regular, playing in the attacking midfield position. In a match against Kashiwa Reysol on 14 April 2018, he set up two goals for the club, as the side won 2–1. After the match, broadcaster DAZN named Miyoshi as the Best Player of the Week. By the end of the first half to the season, he made thirteen appearances despite being absent two times. After the Toulon Tournament, Miyoshi scored his first goal on his return for Hokkaido Consadole Sapporo, in a 4–0 win against Avispa Fukuoka in the third round of the Emperor’s Cup. Three weeks later on 1 August 2018, he played an important for the club, setting up two goals, in a 3–2 win against V-Varen Nagasaki. After the end of the Asian Games tournament, Miyoshi returned to the starting line–up, coming on as a 66th minute substitute, in a 2–0 lost against Kashima Antlers on 23 September 2018. This was followed up by scoring his second goal for Hokkaido Consadole Sapporo, in a 2–1 win against Sagan Tosu. After the match, broadcaster DAZN named Miyoshi as the Best Player of the Week for the second time in the 2018 season. He later scored two more goals for the club, coming against Vegalta Sendai and Júbilo Iwata. At the end of the 2018 season, Miyoshi made twenty–eight appearances and scoring four times in all competitions. Shortly after, he was among eleven players to be selected for the Tag Heuer Young Guns’ Award for the second time..

It was announced on 28 December 2018 that Miyoshi would be joining Yokohama F. Marinos for the 2019 season. Upon joining the club, he was given a number 41 shirt. Miyoshi made a good start to his Yokohama F. Marinos’ career when he scored on his debut, in a 3–2 win against Gamba Osaka in the opening game of the season. Since joining the club, Moyoshi became a first team regular under the management of Ange Postecoglou.

In a match against Vissel Kobe on 18 May 2019, he came on as a 71st minute substitute and scored a brace, in a 4–1 win. On his last appearance for Yokohama F. Marinos against Yokohama FC on 14 August 2019, he set up the opening goal of the game, in a 2–1 win. Despite missing three matches in the 2019 season due to international commitment, Moyoshi made twenty–three appearances and scoring times in all competitions. It was announced that his loan contract with the club was terminated, due to an imminent move to Royal Antwerp.

=== Royal Antwerp ===
On 20 August 2019, he joined Belgian First Division A side Royal Antwerp on loan for a year from Kawasaki Frontale with an option to make the deal permanent. Upon joining the club, he acknowledged the different atmosphere, playing in Belgium than his home country.

Miyoshi scored on his Royal Antwerp debut, just four minutes after coming on as a substitute, in a 2–1 win against Anderlecht on 15 September 2019. He then made his first start for the club a week later against Lokeren in the sixth round of the Belgium Cup, and scored twice, in a 4–2 win, having played extra time. Since joining Royal Antwerp, Miyoshi found his playing time, coming from the substitute bench. He also faced setbacks with injuries throughout the 2019–20 season. On 6 April 2020, it was announced that the club signed Miyoshi on a permanent basis, signing a three–year contract. He appeared as an unused substitute bench, as Royal Antwerp beat Club Brugge to win the Belgian Cup final. Due to the COVID-19 pandemic which resulted in the cancellation of the league, Miyoshi went on to make fifteen appearances and scoring three times in all competitions.

In the 2020–21 season, Miyoshi continued to fight for his first team place that saw him placed on the substitute bench, having missed the first two league matches of the season due to injury. Between October and January, he was given a number of starts for the club, playing in the right–midfield position, though played as a forward occasionally. He then scored his first goal of the season, in a 4–1 win against K.V. Mechelen on 2 October 2020. His second goal of the season came on 6 December 2020, in a 4–2 lost against Genk; which he later scored against them for the second time this season on 30 April 2021. By mid–January, however, Miyoshi lost his first team place after testing positive for COVID-19 and found his playing time, coming from the substitute bench. At the end of the 2020–21 season, he went on to make thirty–two appearances and scoring three times in all competitions.

At the start of the 2021–22 season, Miyoshi missed the three league matches of the season following his international commitment. He returned to the first team, coming on as a 71st minute substitute, in a 1–1 draw against Charleroi on 13 August 2021. Miyoshi scored in both legs of the UEFA Europa League qualifier rounds against AC Omonia and was one of the three successful Royal Antwerp penalty taker in the penalty shootout following 4–4 draw on aggregate, as the club won 3–2 in the shootout. He then scored his third goal of the season, in a 4–2 win against Genk on 22 September 2021. However, Miyoshi suffered a hamstring injury that saw him sidelined for the rest of the year. He returned to the first team, coming on as a 66th minute substitute, in a 3–0 win against Charleroi on 16 January 2022. In a follow–up match against Oostende, Miyoshi came on as a second half substitute and set up a goal for Michel-Ange Balikwisha, who scored the winning goal, in a 2–1 win. He regained his first team place for the rest of the 2021–22 season and helped Royal Antwerp qualify for the play–off I to finish fourth place and playing in the UEFA Europa Conference League next season. During a 2–1 lost against Anderlecht on 12 May 2022, Miyoshi had his goal disallowed after VAR overturned the goal, prompting criticism from manager Brian Priske. At the end of the 2021–22 season, he went on to make thirty appearances and scoring three times in all competitions.

At the start of the 2022–23 season, Miyoshi became a first team regular for Royal Antwerp, playing in the winger position. In the first leg of the UEFA Europa Conference League against Lillestrøm SK, he set up two goals, as the club won 3–1. Miyoshi then scored his first goal of the season, in a 3–0 win against Westerlo on 4 September 2022. However in a 2–1 lost against Kortrijk on 4 October 2022, he suffered a cruciate ligament tear and was substituted in the 44th minutes. Initially out for a month, his injury was sidelined further for the rest of the 2022–23 season. Despite this, Miyoshi was part of the Royal Antwerp squad that won the club their first league title in 66 years, and Belgian Cup. At the end of 2022–23 season, he went on to make fifteen appearances and scoring once in all competitions. Reflecting on winning the double, Miyoshi said: "I think I did my best and felt a lot of good atmosphere at the club, especially in the final season. I know the feeling of winning a title. When you win the cup or a title, there is a very good feeling in the team." With his contract expiring at the end of the 2022–23 season, there was a slim chance of Royal Antwerp keeping him. It was later confirmed that Miyoshi would be leaving the club on 21 June 2023, ending his three years association with Royal Antwerp.

=== Birmingham City ===
Miyoshi joined English Championship club Birmingham City on 22 June 2023 after his contract with Royal Antwerp expired. Upon joining the Blues, he was given a number eleven shirt.

Miyoshi made his debut for the club, coming on as a late substitute in a 1–1 draw with Swansea City on 5 August 2023. He scored his first goal for Birmingham City in a 2–0 win over Bristol City on 29 August 2023. After the match, manager John Eustace praised his performance, stating that Miyoshi "is going to be a special player" for the club and local newspaper Birmingham Mail gave his performance 9/10. He also quickly become a fan favourite among Birmingham City’s supporters. Since joining the Blues, Miyoshi became involved in the first team, rotating in the starting eleven and substitute bench under the management of John Eustace, Wayne Rooney and Tony Mowbray. He then scored two more goals by the end of the year, coming against Huddersfield Town and Sunderland Miyoshi appeared in every matches since the start of the 2023–24 season until he didn’t play against Bristol City on 29 December 2023. Following Rooney’s departure, Miyoshi was given more first team chance under the management of Mowbray. He then scored the last minute goal, in a 2–1 win against Hull City to send Birmingham City through to the fourth round of the FA Cup. Miyoshi scored the winning goal for the second time in the 2023–24 season, when he "reacted sharpest to prod home ahead of keeper Anthony Patterson" in a 2–1 win against Sunderland on 17 February 2024. Miyoshi scored the club’s quickest goal of the 2023–24 season so far against Southampton on 2 March 2024 when "Juninho Bacuna curled an excellent dipping crossfield ball with his right instep to the right edge of the penalty area – and Miyoshi coolly chested down before running on to guide home a looping right-foot volley just inside the far post", in a 4–3 lost. On 27 April 2024, he scored his seventh goal, described as a "perfectly directed first-time strike" by BBC Sport, in a 1–1 draw against Huddersfield Town, which a win would ensure the club's survival in the Championship. On the last game of the season against Norwich City, Miyoshi gave his all in the match, in a 1–0 win, but the results in the other matches saw the club relegated to League One after 29 seasons at a higher level. At the end of the 2023–24 season, he made forty–eight appearances and scoring seven times in all competitions.

In a chaotic season for Birmingham with multiple managerial changes, at the end of which the team were relegated to the third tier, Miyoshi appeared in all but three matches, scoring six goals and making six assists in league competition. He made his last appearance for Birmingham City, coming on as a 62nd-minute substitute, in a 2–0 loss against Fulham in the second round of the League Cup.

=== VfL Bochum ===
Miyoshi signed a four-year contract with Bundesliga club VfL Bochum on 30 August 2024; the fee was undisclosed.

He made his debut for the club, starting a match and played 65 minutes before being substituted, in a 2–1 loss against SC Freiburg on 14 September 2024. However, Miyoshi suffered a hamstring injury that saw him out for one match. But he made his return from injury, coming on as a 72nd-minute substitute, in a 4–2 loss against Borussia Dortmund on 27 September 2024. Following his return from injury, Miyoshi found his playing time, coming from the substitute bench. On 9 November 2024, Miyoshi came on as a 69th-minute substitute against champions, Bayer Leverkusen and scored an equalising goal, in a 1–1 draw A month later against Union Berlin on 14 December 2024, however, he received a straight red in the 13th minute for a foul on András Schäfer, as VfL Bochum won 2–0. After the match, Miyoshi served a two match suspension. Following this, he found himself out of the starting eleven before a muscle injury kept him out for the second half of the season. On the last game of the season against FC St. Pauli, Miyoshi came on as a 77th-minute substitute, in a 2–0 win. At the end of the 2024–25 season, he went on to make nineteen appearances and scoring once in all competitions.

Ahead of the 2025–26 season, Miyoshi was linked with a move to Championship side Blackburn Rovers. But the club dropped interest in signing him, due to his GBE eligibility. Amid to the transfer move, he made his first appearance of the season, coming on as a second half substitute, and setting up VfL Bochum’s second goal of the game, in a 2–0 win against SV Elversberg. However, Miyoshi suffered a torn syndesmosis ligament that saw him out for a month.

== International career ==
=== Youth career ===
In August 2011, Miyoshi was call–up by Japan U16 for the AFC U-16 Championship qualification. He played four times and helped Japan U16 qualify for the AFC U-16 Championship. In May 2012, Miyoshi was called up to the Japan U16 squad for the AFF U-16 Youth Championship in Laos. He helped the Japan U16 reach all the away to the final and scored two goals throughout the tournament, including a scoring at stoppage time, in a 3–1 win against Australia U16. In the AFC U-16 Championship, Miyoshi was called up to the Japan U16 squad and helped the side reach all the away to the final. However in the AFC U-16 Championship final, he was the only successful Japan U15 penalty taker, as the side lost 3–1 on penalties against Uzbekistan U16.

In December 2012, Miyoshi was called up to the Japan U-17 national team for the UAE Junior Friendly Tournament. He appeared three times throughout January. In October 2013, Miyoshi was picked for the Japan U17 squad for the 2013 U-17 World Cup in the United Arab Emirates. He played three matches and Japan quarter final’s run only to lose to Sweden U17 2–1.

In August 2013, Miyoshi was called up to the Japan U18 squad for the first time. He made his Japan U18 debut, starting the whole game, in a 4–1 lost against Czech Republic U18 on 21 August 2013. On 17n December 2014, Miyoshi was called up Japan U18 ide for the 27th Valentin Granatkin International Football Tournament in Russia. In the tournament, he scored two goals, both winning against Slovakia U18 and Bulgaria U18.

On 5 April 2016, Miyoshi was called up to the Japan U19 squad. Having played once, he later withdrew from the Japan U19 squad. After being called up to the Japan U19 squad for the Panda Cup, Miyoshi withdrew due to an illness. In the same month, he was called up to the Japan U19 squad ahead of the AFC U-19 Championship in Bahrain. During in which, Miyoshi scored three times in a build up to the AFC U-19 Championship. He played his first match of the tournament, where he helped the U19 side win 3–0 against Yemen U19. Miyoshi scored his first goal of the tournament, in a 3–0 win against Qatar U19 on 20 October 2016 to help Japan U19 reach the knockout stage. He helped the Japan U19 win both matches in the knockout stage to reach the final. Miyoshi started in the final against Saudi Arabia U19 and played 60 minutes before being substituted; which resulted in Japan U19 winning 5–3 on penalties.

In March 2017, Miyoshi was called up to the Japan U20 squad and was featured in a practice match in Germany. Two months later, he was in the squad of the Japan U-20 national team for the 2017 U-20 World Cup. At this tournament, Miyoshi played three matches, as Japan U20 were eliminated in the knockout stage.

Shortly after Japan U20’s elimination from the FIFA U-20 World Cup, Miyoshi was called up by Japan U23 for the AFC U-23 Championship qualification. He scored Japan’s U23 opening goal of the tournament, in a 8–0 win against Philippines U23 on 19 July 2017. Miyoshi played two more matches in the group stage and helped Japan U23 qualify for the AFC U-23 Championship. On 26 December 2017, he was called up to the Japan U23 squad for the AFC U-23 Championship. Miyoshi scored in Japan’s U23 third match of the group stage, in a 3–1 win against North Korea U23 on 16 January 2018. However, Japan U23 were eliminated in the quarter–finals of the AFC U-23 Championship after losing 4–0 against Uzbekistan U23.

In May 2018, Miyoshi was called up to the Japan U21 squad for the Toulon Tournament in France. He scored the opening goal of the game, in a 2–1 lost against Turkey U21 on 28 May 2018. He went on to make two appearances for the side in the tournament, including being captain, as the under-21 side were eliminated in the Group Stage. Shortly after the elimination, Miyoshi captained Japan U21 once again and helped the under-21 beat Togo U20 1–0 on 7 June 2018.

On 3 August 2018, Miyoshi was called up to the Japan U23 for the Asian Games in Indonesia. He was given the captaincy role ahead of the tournament. Miyoshi captained two times in the group stage that saw Japan U23 reach the knockout stage. Throughout the tournament, he was placed on the substitute bench three times, due to his own injury concern. After Japan U23 reached the final, he captained Japan U23 and played 120 minutes, as the under-23 side lost 2–1 against South Korea U23 on 1 September 2018.

On 7 November 2018, Miyoshi was called up to the Japan U23 for the Dubai Cup. He played two times in the tournament, as Japan U23 finished second place.

=== Olympics career ===
Web Gekisaka named Miyoshi as their potential player to make it to the Japan’s Olympic football team following the country’s successful bid to host the Summer Olympics. In March 2019, he was called up to the Japan’s U23 squad for the AFC U-23 Championship qualification. Miyoshi played two times in the tournament and made a total of seven assists in both matches to help Japan U23 qualify for the AFC U-23 Championship in Thailand.

In June 2021, Yoshida was named in the squad for his third Olympic tournament, this time on home soil, as one of three available over-age players. Prior to the start of the Olympics, he was featured in three out of the four friendly matches for the Samurai Blue. Miyoshi started the match and played 60 minutes before being substituted, in a 1–0 win against South Africa in the group stage. After being placed on the substitute bench in the next, he came on as a second half substitute and scored, in a 4–0 win against France to advance to the knockout stage. However, Japan lost the next two matches in the semi–finals and bronze medal match against Spain and Mexico respectively.

=== Senior career ===
On 24 May 2019, Miyoshi was called by Japan's head coach Hajime Moriyasu to feature in the Copa América played in Brazil. He made his debut on 17 June 2019 in the game against Chile, as a 66th-minute substitute for Daizen Maeda, in a 4–0 lost. Three days later on 20 June 2019, Miyoshi scored his first goals, in a 2–2 draw against Uruguay. However, Japan was eventually eliminated from the group stage after drawing 1–1 against Ecuador.

A year later, Miyoshi was called up to the Japan’s squad for the friendly match against Cameroon and Ivory Coast, but appeared as an unused substitute. He finally made his first appearance for Japan in over a year, starting the whole game, in a 1–0 win against Panama on 13 November 2020. Following his move to Birmingham City, Miyoshi said he’s determined to earn a call–up to make it to the Japan’s squad, having not been called up for over three years.

== Personal life ==
In addition to speaking Japanese, Miyoshi began taking English lessons. While the season was cancelled because of the COVID-19 pandemic, Miyoshi said he exercised regularly in order to maintain his fitness.

On 1 September 2021, Miyoshi revealed that he had married a non-general woman the previous year. Miyoshi is friends with Kaoru Mitoma, having known each other since they were ten and played for the same academy. Outside of football, he’s a fan of anime, including One Piece.

== Career statistics ==
=== Club ===
As of match played 28 August 2026

Appearances and goals by club, season and competition
Club	Season	League			National cup (Note: Includes Emperor's Cup, Belgian Cup, FA Cup)		League cup (Note: Includes J.League Cup, EFL Cup)		Continental		Other		Total	
Club	Season	Division	Apps	Goals	Apps	Goals	Apps	Goals	Apps	Goals	Apps	Goals	Apps	Goals
Kawasaki Frontale	2015	J1 League	3	0	0	0	2	0	—		—		5	0
Kawasaki Frontale	2016	J1 League	15	4	5	0	6	0	—		1 (Note: Appearance in Japanese Super Cup)	0	27	4
Kawasaki Frontale	2017	J1 League	13	1	1	0	2	2	4 (Note: Appearances in AFC Champions League)	0	0	0	20	3
Kawasaki Frontale	Total		31	5	6	0	10	2	4	0	1	0	52	7
Consadole Sapporo (loan)	2018	J1 League	26	3	2	1	0	0	—		—		28	4
Yokohama F. Marinos (loan)	2019	J1 League	19	3	4	0	0	0	—		—		23	3
Royal Antwerp	2019–20	Belgian Pro League	14	1	1	2	—		—		—		15	3
Royal Antwerp	2020–21	Belgian Pro League	23	3	1	0	—		8 (Note: Appearances in UEFA Europa League)	0	—		32	3
Royal Antwerp	2021–22	Belgian Pro League	25	1	0	0	—		5	2	—		30	3
Royal Antwerp	2022–23	Belgian Pro League	10	1	0	0	—		5 (Note: Appearances in UEFA Europa Conference League)	0	—		15	1
Royal Antwerp	Total		72	6	2	2	—		18	2	—		92	10
Birmingham City	2023–24	Championship	43	6	3	1	2	0	—		—		48	7
Birmingham City	2024–25	League One	3	0	0	0	1	0	—		0	0	4	0
Birmingham City	Total		46	6	3	1	3	0	—		0	0	52	7
VfL Bochum	2024–25	Bundesliga	15	1	0	0	—		—		—		15	1
VfL Bochum	2025–26	2. Bundesliga	21	2	1	0	—		—		—		22	2
VfL Bochum	2026–27	2. Bundesliga	4	2	1	0	—		—		—		5	2
VfL Bochum	Total		41	5	2	0	—		—		—		42	5
Career total			234	28	19	4	13	2	22	2	1	0	289	36

=== International ===
Appearances and goals by national team and year
National team	Year	Apps	Goals
Japan	2019	3	2
Japan	2020	2	0
Total		5	2

Scores and results list Japan's goal tally first, score column indicates score after each Miyoshi goal.

List of international goals scored by Koji Miyoshi
No.	Date	Venue	Opponent	Score	Result	Competition
1	20 June 2019	Arena do Grêmio, Porto Alegre, Brazil	Uruguay	1–0	2–2	2019 Copa América
2	20 June 2019	Arena do Grêmio, Porto Alegre, Brazil	Uruguay	2–1	2–2	2019 Copa América

== Honours ==
Kawasaki Frontale

- J1 League: 2017

Yokohama F. Marinos

- J1 League: 2019

Royal Antwerp

- Belgian Pro League: 2022–23
- Belgian Cup: 2019–20, 2022–23

Japan U-19

- AFC U-19 Championship: 2016
