= Niklas Jahn =

German footballer

Personal information
- Date of birth: 19 January 2001 (age 25)
- Place of birth: Germany
- Height: 1.90 m (6 ft 3 in)
- Position: Forward

Team information
- Current team: ZFC Meuselwitz
- Number: 20

Youth career
- –2012: SV 1910 Kahla
- 2012–2019: Carl Zeiss Jena

Senior career*
Years	Team	Apps	(Gls)
2019–2021	Carl Zeiss Jena	9	(1)
2021–	ZFC Meuselwitz	13	(1)
- * Club domestic league appearances and goals as of 6 November 2021

Niklas Jahn (born 19 January 2001) is a German footballer who plays as a forward for ZFC Meuselwitz.

== Career ==
Jahn made his professional debut for Carl Zeiss Jena in the 3. Liga on 22 July 2019, coming on as a substitute in the 86th minute for Marian Sarr in the 1–2 home loss against FC Ingolstadt.
