= Ibrahim Sissoko =

Ibrahim Sissoko may refer to:

- Ibrahim Sissoko (footballer, born 1991), Ivorian football winger for Akhisarspor
- Ibrahim Sissoko (footballer, born 1995), French football forward for AS Saint-Étienne

== See also ==
- Ibrahim Cissoko (born 1993), Dutch football winger
- Ibrahima Sissoko (born 1997), French football midfielder
