= Kjell Wätjen =

German footballer (born 2006)

Personal information
- Full name: Kjell Arik Wätjen
- Date of birth: 16 February 2006 (age 20)
- Place of birth: Gevelsberg, Germany
- Height: 1.83 m (6 ft 0 in)
- Position: Midfielder

Team information
- Current team: Midtjylland
- Number: 29

Youth career
- 2010–2015: FSV Gevelsberg
- 2015–2025: Borussia Dortmund

Senior career*
Years	Team	Apps	(Gls)
2024–2026	Borussia Dortmund	4	(0)
2024–2026	Borussia Dortmund II	20	(5)
2025–2026	→ VfL Bochum (loan)	26	(2)
2026–	Midtjylland	9	(1)

International career^{‡}
2021–2022	Germany U16	8	(1)
2022–2023	Germany U17	7	(2)
2024–2025	Germany U19	8	(2)
2025–	Germany U20	5	(2)
Medal record
Representing Germany
UEFA European Under-17 Championship
Winner	2023
- * Club domestic league appearances and goals as of 2 November 2026 ‡ National team caps and goals as of 31 March 2026

Kjell Arik Wätjen (German pronunciation: [kjɛl ˈvɛːtçən]; born 16 February 2006) is a German professional footballer who plays as a midfielder for Danish Superliga club Midtjylland.

Wätjen won the UEFA European Under-17 tournament with the German U17 national team in 2023.

== Club career ==
Wätjen started playing club football in the Ruhr area in the G-youth of FSV Gevelsberg. At the age of nine years, he moved to Borussia Dortmund in 2015, after playing well at an academy training tournament a year before. In his second season for the U17s team in 2022–23, the midfielder led the team as captain and set up six goals for his teammates in 12 games in the B-Junioren Bundesliga, in addition to scoring three times himself. He then became a permanent member of the BVB U19 squad in the summer of 2023, as did striker Paris Brunner. The German immediately became a regular in central midfield in the Under 19 Bundesliga. At the end of February 2024, alongside Youssoufa Moukoko and Julien Duranville, he was one of three U20 players in the squad for the Champions League round of 16 first leg against PSV Eindhoven. Earlier that month, Wätjen had already been on the bench for the goalless draw against 1. FC Heidenheim in the men's Bundesliga after scoring seven goals in five consecutive games with the U19s.

At the end of March 2024, Wätjen signed a professional contract with Borussia Dortmund valid until June 2028. He was then part of Edin Terzić's squad in other games and won the championship in the western league with the Dortmund A-Youth team. On matchday 32 of the 2023–24 season, Wätjen made his Bundesliga debut for Borussia in the 5–1 home win against FC Augsburg, where he was in the starting eleven and set up Marco Reus' fourth goal.

On 7 May 2024, Wätjen wrote his final high school exams before travelling to Paris on the same day and joining his club's squad in the Champions League semi-final against Paris Saint-Germain, which Dortmund won. Wätjen would be part of the squad that lost with 2–0 against Real Madrid in the final of the 2024 UEFA Champions League, but remained unused. On 24 June 2025, Wätjen moved on loan to VfL Bochum for the 2025–26 season.

On 13 July 2026, Wätjen signed a five-year contract with Danish Superliga club Midtjylland, reuniting with his former youth coach Mike Tullberg.

== International career ==
Wätjen first played for Germany at U16 level. With the U17s, he took part in the European U17-Championships in Hungary in May 2023 alongside Dortmund teammates Paris Brunner, Almugera Kabar and Charles Herrmann. He reached the final undefeated with the national team, scoring a stoppage-time goal in a 3–0 victory against Scotland in the group stage, before clinching the title against France by winning on penalties.

Wätjen rejected a call up to Germany's squad for the U17 World Cup in Indonesia in winter 2023 due to upcoming high school exams. His national team won the tournament.

Wätjen played at the 2025 UEFA European Under-19 Championship, where Germany reached semi-finals.

== Career statistics ==
As of match played 19 October 2026

Appearances and goals by club, season and competition
Club	Season	League			National cup		Continental		Other		Total	
Club	Season	Division	Apps	Goals	Apps	Goals	Apps	Goals	Apps	Goals	Apps	Goals
Borussia Dortmund	2023–24	Bundesliga	2	0	—		0	0	—		2	0
Borussia Dortmund	2024–25	Bundesliga	2	0	0	0	0	0	0	0	2	0
Borussia Dortmund	2026–27	Bundesliga	0	0	0	0	0	0	0	0	0	0
Borussia Dortmund	Total		4	0	0	0	0	0	0	0	4	0
Borussia Dortmund II	2024–25	3. Liga	20	5	—		—		—		20	5
VfL Bochum (loan)	2025–26	2. Bundesliga	26	2	3	0	—		—		29	2
Midtjylland	2026–27	Danish Superliga	8	0	1	2	6 (Note: Two appearances in UEFA Europa League, four appearances in UEFA Conference League)	0	—		15	2
Career total			58	7	4	2	6	0	0	0	68	9

== Personal life ==
Born in Germany, Wätjen is of Italian descent through his mother. Because of his name, he was erroneously reported to be of Swedish descent by Transfermarkt. His father is from Northern Germany, where Nordic names are common. After the fake news regarding his ancestry spread, the Swedish Football Association made immediate efforts to ensure his services.

== Honours ==
Borussia Dortmund

- A-Junioren-Bundesliga West: 2024
- UEFA Champions League runner-up: 2023–24

Germany U17

- UEFA European Under-17 Championship: 2023
