= VfL Bochum =

German association football club

- Full name: Verein für Leibesübungen Bochum 1848 Fußballgemeinschaft e. V.
- Founded: 26 July 1848; 178 years ago
- Ground: Vonovia Ruhrstadion
- Capacity: 27,599
- Chairman: Andreas Luthe
- Manager: Uwe Rösler
- League: 2. Bundesliga
- 2025–26: 2. Bundesliga, 9th of 18
- Website: vfl-bochum.de
Home colours	Away colours	Third colours

Verein für Leibesübungen Bochum 1848 Fußballgemeinschaft, commonly referred to as VfL Bochum (German pronunciation: [faʊ̯ʔɛfˌʔɛl ˈboːxʊm]), is a German professional association football club based in the city of Bochum, North Rhine-Westphalia. They currently play in the 2. Bundesliga following relegation from the Bundesliga in the previous season.

== History ==
=== Founding to World War II ===
VfL Bochum is one of the oldest sports organisations in the world, claiming an origin date of 26 July 1848 when an article in the Märkischer Sprecher – a local newspaper – called for the creation of a gymnastics club. The Turnverein zu Bochum was then formally established on 18 February 1849. In December 1851, however, the club was forcibly dissolved and banned by the Prussian provincial administration then reestablished on 19 June 1860 as the Bochum Gymnastics Club. The club was reorganised in May 1904 as Turnverein zu Bochum, gegründet 1848 and formed a football department on 31 January 1911. On 1 April 1919, the club merged with Spiel und Sport 08 Bochum to form Turn- und Sportverein Bochum 1848. On 1 February 1924, the two clubs from the earlier merger split into the Bochumer Turnverein 1848 (gymnastics department) and Turn- und Sportverein Bochum 1908 (football, track and field, handball, hockey and tennis departments).

The Nazi regime forced Bochumer Turnverein 1848 to merge with Turn- und Sport Bochum 1908 and Sportverein Germania Vorwärts Bochum 1906 into the current-day club VfL Bochum on 14 April 1938. After the merger, VfL Bochum continued to compete in the top flight as part of the Gauliga Westfalen.

As World War II progressed, play throughout Germany became increasingly difficult due to player shortages, travel problems and damage to football fields from Allied bombing raids. VfL became part of the wartime side Kriegsspielgemeinschaft VfL 1848/Preußen Bochum alongside Preußen 07 Bochum, before re-emerging as a separate side again after the war. Although they fielded competitive sides, they had the misfortune of playing in the same division as Schalke 04, which was the dominant team of the era. VfL's best result was therefore a distant second place in 1938–39.

Michael Lameck holds the record for most appearances with the club at the top level with 596 appearances between the period of 1972–1988. The player with the most all-time goals for VfL Bochum is Hans Walitza, who scored 135 goals in 198 appearances between 1969 and 1974.The player with the most assists in VfL Bochum's history is Dariusz Wosz, who recorded 82 assists in 383 competitive appearances for the club.

=== Postwar and entry to Bundesliga play ===
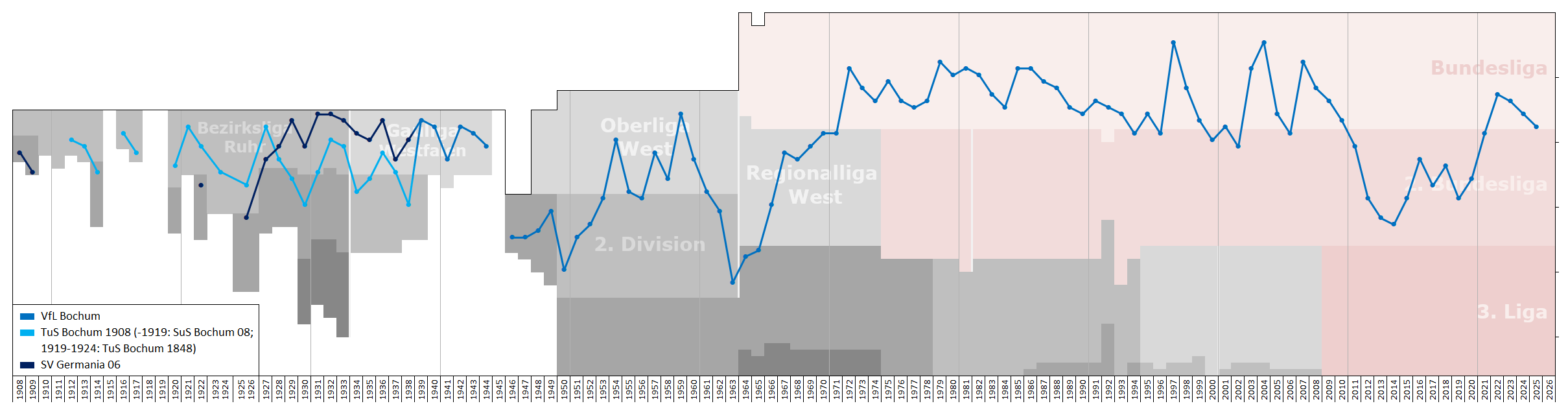
Historical chart of VfL Bochum league performance

Following World War II, the football section resumed play as the independent VfL Bochum 1848 and played its first season in the second division 2. Oberliga West in 1949, while Preußen Bochum went on to lower tier amateur level play. VfL won the division title in 1953 to advance to the Oberliga West for a single season. They repeated their divisional win in 1956 and returned to the top-flight until again being relegated after the 1960–61 season.

With the formation of the Bundesliga, Germany's new professional league, in 1963 VfL found itself in the third tier Amateurliga Westfalen. A first-place result there in 1965 raised them to the Regionalliga West (II), from which they began a steady climb up the league table to the Bundesliga in 1971. During this rise, Bochum also played its way to the final of the 1967–68 DFB-Pokal, where they lost 1–4 to 1. FC Köln.

In spite of being a perennial lower table side, Bochum developed a reputation for tenaciousness on the field in a run of 20 seasons in the top flight. The club made a repeat appearance in the DFB-Pokal final in 1988, losing 1–0 to Eintracht Frankfurt. Relegated after a 16th-place finish in the 1992–93 season, the team became a classic "yo-yo club", moving between the Bundesliga and 2. Bundesliga. The club finished in 5th place in the Bundesliga in 1996–97 and 2003–04, which earned them appearances in the UEFA Cup. In 1997, they advanced to the third round, where they were eliminated by Ajax, and in 2004, they were eliminated early on away goals (0–0 and 1–1) by Standard Liège.

In the 2020–21 season, the club won the 2. Bundesliga, earning promotion to the Bundesliga, where they stayed for four seasons. In the 2023–24 season, the club was in a relegation playoff with Fortuna Düsseldorf, winning 6–5 on penalties, after initially being 3–0 down in the first leg. The following season, Bochum were relegated after a 4–1 defeat against Mainz 05 in their penultimate fixture. Their four-year stay in the Bundesliga ended on a positive note with a 2–0 win away to St. Pauli.

=== Current ===
Today's sports club has 5,000 members, with the football department accounting for over 2,200 of these. Other sections now part of the association include athletics, badminton, basketball, dance, fencing, gymnastics, handball, field hockey, swimming, table tennis, tennis, and volleyball.

== Players ==
=== Current squad ===
As of 2 September 2026

Note: Flags indicate national team as defined under FIFA eligibility rules; some limited exceptions apply. Players may hold more than one non-FIFA nationality.

No.	Pos.	Nation	Player
1	GK	GER	Timo Horn (captain)
2	DF	SUR	Sean Klaiber
3	DF	GER	Philipp Strompf
4	DF	TUR	Yiğit Karademir
5	DF	EST	Karol Mets
6	MF	ALB	Enis Çokaj
7	FW	DEN	Christian Rasmussen
8	MF	GER	Jean-Manuel Mbom
10	FW	GER	Berkan Taz
13	DF	DEN	Oliver Olsen
14	FW	BEL	Jarne Steuckers (on loan from KRC Genk)
15	DF	AUT	Michael Steinwender
16	GK	AUT	Tino Casali
17	FW	PHI	Gerrit Holtmann

No.	Pos.	Nation	Player
19	FW	GER	Daniel Hanslik
23	MF	JPN	Kōji Miyoshi
24	MF	GER	Mats Pannewig
27	FW	GER	Babis Drakas
28	MF	ENG	Charlie Patino (on loan from Deportivo A Coruña)
29	FW	TOG	Mansour Ouro-Tagba
31	DF	GER	Leon Sawas
32	DF	GER	Maximilian Wittek
33	FW	GER	Philipp Hofmann
34	MF	GER	Tom Meyer
36	FW	GER	Luis Pick
37	MF	ITA	Alessandro Crimaldi
38	GK	GER	Hugo Rölleke
39	MF	GER	Lasse Isbruch

=== Out on loan ===
Note: Flags indicate national team as defined under FIFA eligibility rules; some limited exceptions apply. Players may hold more than one non-FIFA nationality.

No.	Pos.	Nation	Player
—	DF	GER	Darnell Keumo (at Waldhof Mannheim until 30 June 2027)
—	DF	GER	Kacper Kościerski (at Alemannia Aachen until 30 June 2027)

No.	Pos.	Nation	Player
—	DF	GER	Colin Kleine-Bekel (at St. Gallen until 30 June 2027)
—	DF	NOR	Mikkel Rakneberg (at OB until 30 June 2027)

== Honours ==
=== Domestic ===
- 2. Bundesliga (II): 1993–94, 1995–96, 2005–06, 2020–21
- Regionalliga West (II): 1969–70, 1970–71
- 2. Oberliga West (II): 1952–53, 1955–56
- Verbandsliga Westfalen (III): 1964–65

=== Cup ===
- DFB-Pokal
  - Runners-up: 1967–68, 1987–88

=== Regional ===
- Western German Cup (II): 1967–68

=== Youth ===
- German Under 19 championship: 1969
- German Under 17 championship: 1985
- Under 19 Bundesliga West: 2004, 2005

=== Individual ===
- Bundesliga top goal scorer: 1985–86 (Stefan Kuntz, 22 goals), 2002–03 (Thomas Christiansen, 21 goals (w/Giovane Élber)), 2006–07 (Theofanis Gekas, 20 goals)
- 2. Bundesliga top goal scorer: 1993–94 (Uwe Wegmann, 22 goals), 2015–16 (Simon Terodde, 25 goals)

== League results ==
=== European record ===
Competition	Played	Win	D	Lose	GF	GA
UEFA Cup	8	2	3	3	15	14
UEFA Intertoto Cup	28	10	8	10	37	33
Total	36	12	11	13	52	47

== Stadium ==
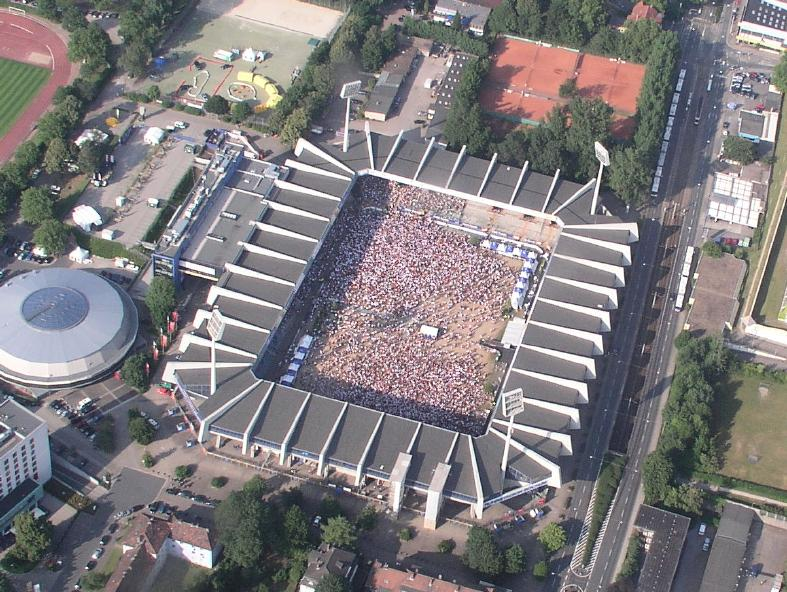
Ruhrstadion

Ruhrstadion (also known as the Vonovia Ruhrstadion under a sponsorship deal) was one of the first modern football-only stadiums in Germany. It was built in the 1970s on the traditional ground of TuS Bochum 08 at the Castroper Straße, north of the city centre.

The fully roofed venue's capacity is 27,599, including standing room for 12,025.

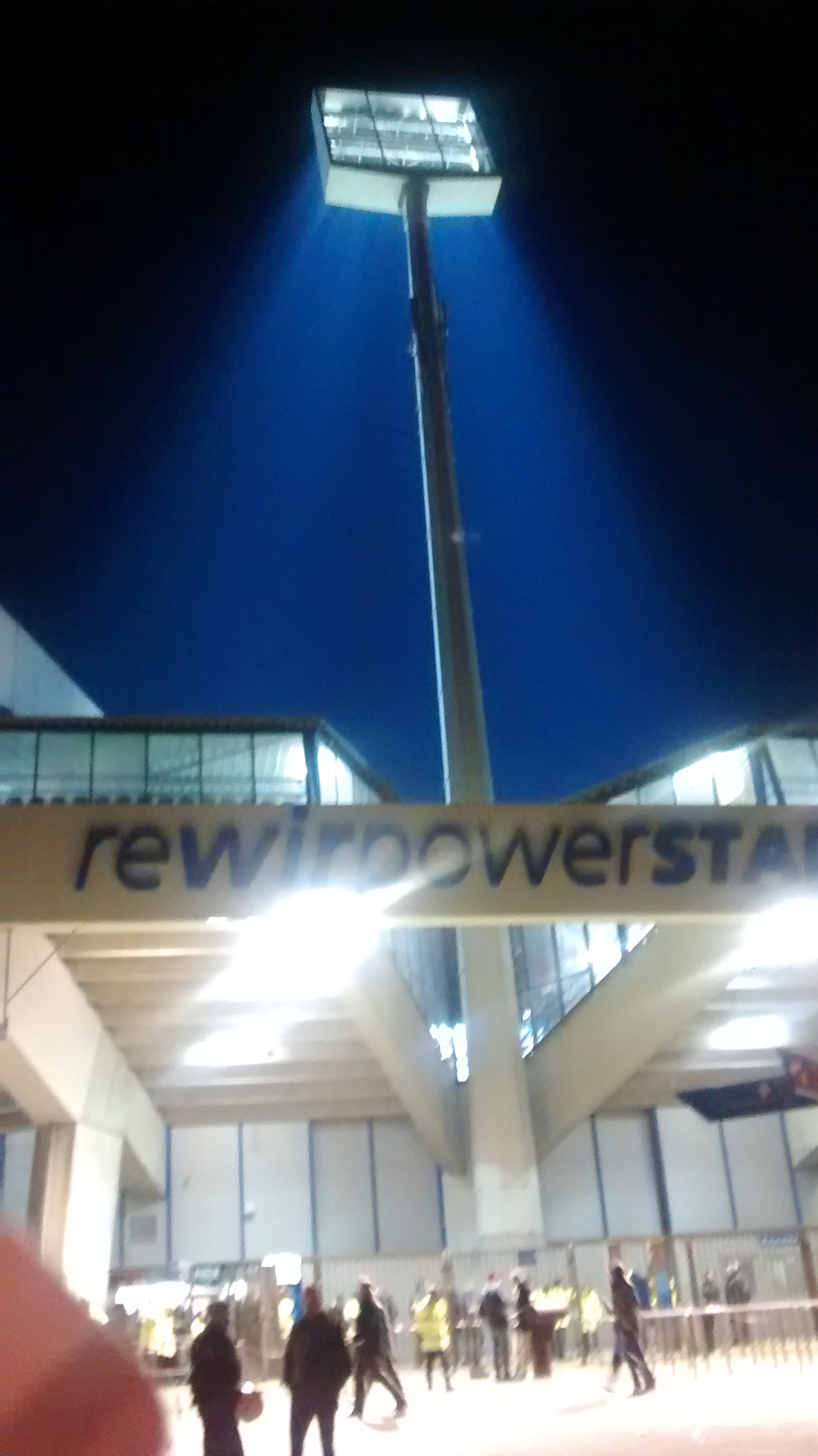
Ruhrstadion

== Coaches ==
=== Current staff ===
As of 15 September 2025

Position	Name
Head coach	(Germany) Uwe Rösler
Assistant coach	(Germany) Marc-André Kruska (France) Anthony Losilla (Germany) Alessandro Riedle
Goalkeeper coach	(Austria) Sebastian Baumgartner
Athletic trainer	(Germany) Björn Kadlubowski (Germany) Alexander Bülow
Video analyst	(Germany) Niklas Honnete (Germany) Robin Mehring
Chief analyst	(Germany) Rexhep Kushutani
Head of physiotherapy and rehabilitation	(Germany) Maik Liesbrock
Rehabilitation trainer	(Germany) Mathis Beckmann
Team manager	(Germany) Nico Böttcher
Physiotherapist	(Germany) Maximilian David (Germany) Fabian Sklareck (Bosnia and Herzegovina) Saša Živanović
Equipment manager	(Germany) Markus Eggers (Germany) Andreas Pahl
Team doctor	(Germany) Dr. Ghani Hilal (Germany) Mark Sandfort

=== Coaches ===
Years	Coach
1938–?	Georg Hochgesang
1953–1956	Emil Melcher
1956–1960	Herbert Widmayer
1960–1961	Fritz Silken
1961–1963	Hermann Lindemann
1963–1967	Hubert Schieth
1967–1972	Hermann Eppenhoff
1972–1979	Heinz Höher
1979–1981	Helmuth Johannsen
1981–1986	Rolf Schafstall
1986–1988	Hermann Gerland
1988–1989	Franz-Josef Tenhagen
1989–1991	Reinhard Saftig
1991	Rolf Schafstall (caretaker)
1991–1992	Holger Osieck
1992–1995	Jürgen Gelsdorf
1995–1999	Klaus Toppmöller
1999	Ernst Middendorp
1999	Bernard Dietz (caretaker)
2000–2001	Ralf Zumdick
2001	Rolf Schafstall (caretaker)
2001	Bernard Dietz
2001–2005	Peter Neururer
2005–2009	Marcel Koller
2009	Frank Heinemann (caretaker)
2009–2010	Heiko Herrlich
2010	Dariusz Wosz (caretaker)
2010–2011	Friedhelm Funkel
2011–2012	Andreas Bergmann
2012–2013	Karsten Neitzel (caretaker)
2013–2014	Peter Neururer
2014	Frank Heinemann (caretaker)
2014–2017	Gertjan Verbeek
2017	Ismail Atalan
2017–2018	Jens Rasiejewski (caretaker)
2018	Heiko Butscher (caretaker)
2018–2019	Robin Dutt
2019	Heiko Butscher (caretaker)
2019–2022	Thomas Reis
2022	Heiko Butscher (caretaker)
2022–2024	Thomas Letsch
2024	Heiko Butscher (caretaker)
2024	Peter Zeidler
2024	Markus Feldhoff (caretaker)
2024–2025	Dieter Hecking
2025	David Siebers
2025–	Uwe Rösler
