= List of German football transfers summer 2026 =

This is a list of German football transfers in the summer transfer window 2026 by club. Only transfers of the Bundesliga, and 2. Bundesliga are included.

== Bundesliga ==
Note: Flags indicate national team as has been defined under FIFA eligibility rules. Players may hold more than one non-FIFA nationality.

=== Bayern Munich ===
In:

No.	Pos.	Nation	Player
11	DF	GER	Nathaniel Brown (from Eintracht Frankfurt)
34	FW	MAR	Ismael Saibari (from PSV)
39	MF	SEN	Bara Sapoko Ndiaye (from Gambinos Stars, previously on loan)
—	MF	GER	Noël Aséko Nkili (from Hannover 96)

Out:

No.	Pos.	Nation	Player
8	MF	GER	Leon Goretzka (to Aston Villa)
11	FW	SEN	Nicolas Jackson (loan return to Chelsea)
22	DF	POR	Raphaël Guerreiro (free agent)
—	MF	PER	Felipe Chávez (on loan to 1. FC Magdeburg, previously on loan at 1. FC Köln)
—	MF	GER	Arijon Ibrahimović (on loan to FC Augsburg, previously on loan at 1. FC Heidenheim)
—	FW	ESP	Bryan Zaragoza (on loan to Espanyol, previously on loan at Roma)
—	MF	GER	Noël Aséko Nkili (to Eintracht Frankfurt)
—	GK	ISR	Daniel Peretz (to Southampton, previously on loan)
—	GK	GER	Alexander Nübel (to Beşiktaş, previously on loan at VfB Stuttgart)
—	MF	GER	Noël Aséko Nkili (to Hannover 96, previously on loan)
—	MF	POR	João Palhinha (to Benfica, previously on loan at Tottenham Hotspur)
—	MF	CRO	Lovro Zvonarek (to Estrela da Amadora, previously on loan at Grasshopper)
—	MF	GER	Maurice Krattenmacher (to SV Elversberg, previously on loan at Hertha BSC)
—	FW	SWE	Jonah Kusi-Asare (to Fulham, previously on loan)
—	FW	GER	Armindo Sieb (to Los Angeles FC, previously on loan at Mainz 05)

=== Borussia Dortmund ===
In:

No.	Pos.	Nation	Player
18	MF	ENG	Ethan Nwaneri (on loan from Arsenal, previously on loan at Marseille)
19	MF	GRE	Konstantinos Karetsas (from Genk)
22	DF	FRA	Joane Gadou (from Red Bull Salzburg)
25	MF	NED	Joey Veerman (from PSV)
28	MF	ECU	Justin Lerma (from Independiente del Valle)
36	DF	BRA	Kauã Prates (from Cruzeiro)
45	MF	GRE	Giannis Konstantelias (from PAOK)

Out:

No.	Pos.	Nation	Player
2	DF	BRA	Yan Couto (on loan to Como)
6	MF	TUR	Salih Özcan (to Beşiktaş)
10	MF	GER	Julian Brandt (to Ajax)
25	DF	GER	Niklas Süle (to SV Tiefenbach)
27	FW	GER	Karim Adeyemi (to Barcelona)
42	DF	GER	Almugera Kabar (on loan to NEC)
—	GK	GER	Diant Ramaj (on loan to Copenhagen, previously on loan at 1. FC Heidenheim)
—	MF	GER	Kjell Wätjen (to Midtjylland, previously on loan at VfL Bochum)
—	MF	USA	Cole Campbell (to SV Elversberg, previously on loan at TSG Hoffenheim)
—	FW	BEL	Julien Duranville (to Lyon, previously on loan at Basel)

=== RB Leipzig ===
In:

No.	Pos.	Nation	Player
1	GK	NOR	Ørjan Nyland (from Sevilla)
3	DF	FRA	Maxime Estève (from Burnley)
9	FW	ESP	Marc Guiu (from Chelsea)
20	MF	GER	Rocco Reitz (from Borussia Mönchengladbach)
21	MF	MAR	Neil El Aynaoui (on loan from Roma)
28	FW	FRA	Christopher Nkunku (on loan from AC Milan)
—	MF	JPN	Ota Yamamoto (from RB Omiya Ardija)

Out:

No.	Pos.	Nation	Player
1	GK	HUN	Péter Gulácsi (to Villarreal)
5	DF	FRA	El Chadaille Bitshiabu (on loan to Galatasaray)
9	FW	DEN	Conrad Harder (on loan to Strasbourg)
18	FW	NGR	Suleman Sani (Al-Qadsiah)
19	DF	SRB	Kosta Nedeljković (loan return to Aston Villa)
21	FW	NED	Ayodele Thomas (to NEC)
24	MF	AUT	Xaver Schlager (to Nottingham Forest)
49	FW	CIV	Yan Diomande (to Real Madrid)
—	MF	JPN	Ota Yamamoto (on loan to RB Omiya Ardija)
—	GK	GER	Timo Schlieck (on loan to SC Verl, previously on loan at Greuther Fürth)
—	DF	NED	Lutsharel Geertruida (on loan to PSV, previously on loan at Sunderland)
—	DF	BEL	Joyeux Masanka Bungi (on loan to VfB Stuttgart II, previously on loan at New York Red Bulls)
—	MF	MKD	Eljif Elmas (on loan to Atalanta, previously on loan at Napoli)
—	MF	BEL	Arthur Vermeeren (on loan to Royal Antwerp, previously on loan at Marseille)
—	DF	GER	Frederik Jäkel (to Eintracht Braunschweig, previously on loan)
—	DF	NOR	Jonathan Norbye (to Haugesund, previously on loan at Fredrikstad)
—	FW	BEL	Loïs Openda (to Juventus, previously on loan)
—	FW	GER	Robert Ramšak (to Aluminij, previously on loan at SV Sandhausen)

=== VfB Stuttgart ===
In:

No.	Pos.	Nation	Player
11	MF	MAR	Bilal El Khannouss (from Leicester City, previously on loan)
17	FW	GER	Dženan Pejčinović (from VfL Wolfsburg)
21	MF	GER	Grischa Prömel (from TSG Hoffenheim)
33	GK	GER	Marius Funk (from Energie Cottbus)
44	FW	SVK	Leo Sauer (from Feyenoord)

Out:

No.	Pos.	Nation	Player
15	DF	GER	Pascal Stenzel (free agent)
19	MF	GER	Noah Darvich (on loan to SV Elversberg)
25	FW	ECU	Jeremy Arévalo (on loan to Estrela da Amadora)
27	FW	ALG	Badredine Bouanani (on loan to Rangers)
30	MF	ESP	Chema Andrés (to Brighton & Hove Albion)
33	GK	GER	Alexander Nübel (loan return to Bayern Munich)
35	MF	GER	Mirza Catovic (on loan to Barcelona Atlètic)
44	GK	GER	Florian Hellstern (on loan to Greuther Fürth)
45	FW	SRB	Lazar Jovanović (to Udinese)
—	MF	GER	Laurin Ulrich (on loan to SC Paderborn, previously on loan at 1. FC Magdeburg)
—	FW	SRB	Jovan Milošević (to Braga, previously on loan at Werder Bremen)

=== TSG Hoffenheim ===
In:

No.	Pos.	Nation	Player
4	DF	GER	Sean Dulic (from 1860 Munich)
8	MF	AUT	Patrick Wimmer (from VfL Wolfsburg)
14	FW	DEN	Adam Daghim (from Red Bull Salzburg, previously on loan at VfL Wolfsburg)
17	MF	BEL	Nathan De Cat (from Anderlecht)
32	MF	GER	Cajetan Lenz (from VfL Bochum)
39	DF	NED	Mats Rots (from Twente)
—	FW	SUI	Alessandro Vogt (from St. Gallen)

Out:

No.	Pos.	Nation	Player
6	MF	GER	Grischa Prömel (to VfB Stuttgart)
9	FW	TOG	Ihlas Bebou (free agent)
10	MF	GER	Muhammed Damar (to VfL Wolfsburg)
20	MF	USA	Cole Campbell (loan return to Borussia Dortmund)
25	DF	NGR	Kevin Akpoguma (to Frosinone)
29	FW	CIV	Bazoumana Touré (to Newcastle United)
31	FW	CZE	Yannick Eduardo (on loan to ADO Den Haag)
38	FW	GER	Deniz Zeitler (on loan to SC Paderborn)
45	DF	GER	Kelven Frees (on loan to 1. FC Kaiserslautern)
48	MF	BIH	Luka Đurić (to SC Paderborn)
54	DF	GER	Luca Erlein (to Bayer Leverkusen)
—	FW	SUI	Alessandro Vogt (on loan to 1. FC Heidenheim)
—	GK	GER	Nahuel Noll (on loan to SC Paderborn, previously on loan at Hannover 96)
—	DF	BRA	Arthur Chaves (on loan to Botafogo, previously on loan at FC Augsburg)
—	MF	GER	Umut Tohumcu (on loan to Red Bull Salzburg, previously on loan at Holstein Kiel)
—	FW	NGR	Gift Orban (on loan to Amedspor, previously on loan at Hellas Verona)
—	FW	NGR	Precious Benjamin (on loan to Austria Lustenau, previously on loan at SCR Altach)
—	FW	TUR	Erencan Yardımcı (on loan to 1. FC Kaiserslautern, previously on loan at Eintracht Braunschweig)
—	DF	FRA	Stanley Nsoki (to Union Berlin, previously on loan)
—	DF	HUN	Attila Szalai (to Pogoń Szczecin, previously on loan)
—	DF	GER	Hennes Behrens (to FC Augsburg, previously on loan at 1. FC Heidenheim)
—	MF	GER	Dennis Geiger (to NEC, previously on loan at Aberdeen)
—	FW	BIH	Haris Tabaković (to Red Bull Salzburg, previously on loan at Borussia Mönchengladbach)

=== Bayer Leverkusen ===
In:

No.	Pos.	Nation	Player
2	DF	ARG	Facundo Medina (from Marseille)
3	DF	ESP	Miguel Gutiérrez (from Napoli)
9	FW	POR	Afonso Moreira (from Lyon)
18	MF	GER	Kennet Eichhorn (from Hertha BSC)
19	FW	FRA	Moussa Diaby (from Al-Ittihad)
20	DF	CIV	Guéla Doué (from Strasbourg)
27	FW	BIH	Kerim Alajbegović (from Red Bull Salzburg)
—	FW	MLI	Ndjicoura Bomba (from CS Bamako)
—	DF	GER	Luca Erlein (from TSG Hoffenheim)

Out:

No.	Pos.	Nation	Player
13	DF	BRA	Arthur (on loan to Werder Bremen)
16	DF	FRA	Axel Tape (on loan to Levante)
18	GK	SUI	Jonas Omlin (loan return to Borussia Mönchengladbach)
19	FW	NED	Ernest Poku (on loan to Beşiktaş)
20	DF	ESP	Álex Grimaldo (to Atlético Madrid)
25	MF	ARG	Exequiel Palacios (to Ipswich Town)
27	FW	BIH	Kerim Alajbegović (to Juventus)
41	DF	MLI	Issa Traoré (on loan to Trenčín)
—	DF	GER	Luca Erlein (on loan to Energie Cottbus)
—	DF	SEN	Abdoulaye Faye (on loan to Celta Vigo, previously on loan at Lorient)
—	DF	FRA	Jeanuël Belocian (on loan to Racing Santander, previously on loan at VfL Wolfsburg)
—	MF	BEL	Noah Mbamba (on loan to Lorient, previously on loan at Dender)
—	MF	GER	Francis Onyeka (on loan to SV Elversberg, previously on loan at VfL Bochum)
—	FW	GER	Farid Alfa-Ruprecht (on loan to Hertha BSC, previously on loan at VfL Bochum)
—	GK	CZE	Matěj Kovář (to PSV, previously on loan)
—	DF	ECU	Piero Hincapié (to Arsenal, previously on loan)
—	FW	ARG	Alejo Sarco (to Sporting Gijón, previously on loan at Borussia Mönchengladbach)

=== SC Freiburg ===
In:

No.	Pos.	Nation	Player
1	GK	GER	Mio Backhaus (from Werder Bremen)
16	MF	GER	Yannik Engelhardt (from Como, previously on loan at Borussia Mönchengladbach)
20	MF	JPN	Rihito Yamamoto (from Sint-Truiden)
42	FW	JPN	Keisuke Gotō (from Anderlecht, previously on loan at Sint-Truiden)
—	FW	TUN	Louey Ben Farhat (from Karlsruher SC)

Out:

No.	Pos.	Nation	Player
1	GK	GER	Noah Atubolu (on loan to Eintracht Frankfurt)
11	MF	GHA	Daniel-Kofi Kyereh (to VfL Osnabrück)
26	FW	GER	Maximilian Philipp (free agent)
36	DF	GER	Karl Steinmann (on loan to Hannover 96)
44	MF	SUI	Johan Manzambi (to Aston Villa)
—	FW	TUN	Louey Ben Farhat (on loan to Karlsruher SC)
—	FW	TUR	Eren Dinkçi (on loan to Werder Bremen, previously on loan at 1. FC Heidenheim)
—	MF	GER	Merlin Röhl (to Everton, previously on loan)
—	MF	GER	Robert Wagner (to Dynamo Dresden, previously on loan)
—	MF	GER	Noah Weißhaupt (to Darmstadt 98, previously on loan at Hannover 96)
—	FW	AUT	Junior Adamu (to Schalke 04, previously on loan at Celtic)

=== Eintracht Frankfurt ===
In:

No.	Pos.	Nation	Player
1	GK	GER	Noah Atubolu (on loan from SC Freiburg)
3	DF	FRA	Lilian Brassier (from Rennes)
5	DF	BRA	Otávio (from Estrela da Amadora)
15	MF	GER	Noël Aséko Nkili (from Bayern Munich)
25	MF	NGR	Raphael Onyedika (from Club Brugge)
35	FW	DEN	Malik Pimpong (from Midtjylland youth)
—	FW	GER	Noel Futkeu (from Greuther Fürth)

Out:

No.	Pos.	Nation	Player
3	DF	BEL	Arthur Theate (on loan to Bologna)
5	DF	SUI	Aurèle Amenda (to Coventry City)
13	DF	DEN	Rasmus Kristensen (to Midtjylland)
15	MF	TUN	Ellyes Skhiri (to 1. FC Köln)
16	MF	SWE	Hugo Larsson (on loan to Fulham)
18	MF	SYR	Mahmoud Dahoud (to Dubai United)
19	FW	FRA	Jean-Mattéo Bahoya (on loan to Leeds United)
21	DF	GER	Nathaniel Brown (to Bayern Munich)
23	GK	GER	Michael Zetterer (to Leeds United)
25	FW	FRA	Arnaud Kalimuendo (loan return to Nottingham Forest)
30	FW	BEL	Michy Batshuayi (to Abha)
—	FW	GER	Noel Futkeu (on loan to SV Elversberg)
—	FW	CIV	Elye Wahi (reloan to Nice)
—	DF	FRA	Niels Nkounkou (on loan to Nice, previously on loan at Torino)
—	GK	ALB	Simon Simoni (to Luzern, previously on loan at 1. FC Kaiserslautern)
—	DF	CRO	Hrvoje Smolčić (to Çorum, previously on loan at Kocaelispor)
—	MF	CMR	Junior Dina Ebimbe (to Schalke 04, previously on loan at Brest)

=== FC Augsburg ===
In:

No.	Pos.	Nation	Player
2	DF	GER	Calvin Brackelmann (from SC Paderborn)
7	DF	KOR	Seol Young-woo (from Red Star Belgrade)
8	MF	GER	Sima Suso (from Fortuna Düsseldorf)
9	FW	POR	Rodrigo Ribeiro (from Sporting CP, previously on loan)
16	DF	GER	Hennes Behrens (from TSG Hoffenheim, previously on loan at 1. FC Heidenheim)
21	MF	GER	Arijon Ibrahimović (on loan from Bayern Munich, previously on loan at 1. FC Heidenheim)
23	MF	GER	Faik Sakar (from RB Leipzig youth)
35	DF	SLE	Juma Bah (on loan from Manchester City, previously on loan at Nice)
38	FW	AUT	Michael Gregoritsch (from Brøndby, previously on loan)
48	GK	GER	Tom Wisbereit (from Union Berlin youth)

Out:

No.	Pos.	Nation	Player
3	DF	DEN	Mads Pedersen (to Hertha BSC)
8	MF	KOS	Elvis Rexhbeçaj (to VfL Wolfsburg)
11	FW	TUN	Ismaël Gharbi (loan return to Braga)
13	DF	GRE	Dimitris Giannoulis (to PAOK)
16	DF	SUI	Cédric Zesiger (to Young Boys)
17	MF	CRO	Kristijan Jakić (on loan to PAOK)
24	FW	GER	Thomas Kastanaras (to Würzburger Kickers)
25	GK	GER	Daniel Klein (to Aberdeen)
31	DF	GER	Keven Schlotterbeck (to Southampton)
34	DF	BRA	Arthur Chaves (loan return to TSG Hoffenheim)
41	DF	GER	Felix Meiser (to Fortuna Düsseldorf)
43	DF	AUT	Oliver Sorg (to SV Ried)
—	GK	POL	Marcel Łubik (on loan to Wisła Kraków, previously on loan at Górnik Zabrze)
—	FW	GER	Yusuf Kabadayı (on loan to Rijeka, previously on loan at Gaziantep)
—	FW	FRA	Kyliane Dong (on loan to Bolton Wanderers, previously on loan at Pau)
—	FW	TUN	Elias Saad (on loan to Nashville SC, previously on loan at Hannover 96)
—	FW	COD	Nathanaël Mbuku (on loan to Sint-Truiden, previously on loan at Montpellier)
—	FW	LUX	Aiman Dardari (on loan to Rot-Weiss Essen, previously on loan at Greuther Fürth)
—	DF	GER	Maximilian Bauer (to Arminia Bielefeld, previously on loan)
—	DF	CRO	David Čolina (to Zagłębie Lubin, previously on loan at Osijek)
—	DF	TOG	Henri Koudossou (to Arminia Bielefeld, previously on loan at 1. FC Nürnberg)

=== Mainz 05 ===
In:

No.	Pos.	Nation	Player
1	GK	GER	Alexander Schwolow (from Heart of Midlothian)
3	DF	PER	Fabio Gruber (from 1. FC Nürnberg)
4	DF	AUT	Stefan Posch (from Como, previously on loan)
5	MF	GER	Eric Martel (from 1. FC Köln)
11	FW	GHA	Ransford Königsdörffer (from Hamburger SV)
23	FW	SUR	Sheraldo Becker (from Osasuna, previously on loan)
24	MF	JPN	Sōta Kawasaki (from Kyoto Sanga, previously on loan)

Out:

No.	Pos.	Nation	Player
1	GK	GER	Lasse Rieß (on loan to Fortuna Düsseldorf)
5	DF	GER	Maxim Leitsch (free agent)
11	FW	GER	Armindo Sieb (loan return to Bayern Munich)
14	FW	DEN	William Bøving (on loan to 1. FC Nürnberg)
18	DF	AUS	Kasey Bos (on loan to Excelsior)
22	MF	AUT	Nikolas Veratschnig (to Red Bull Salzburg)
25	DF	NOR	Andreas Hanche-Olsen (to Chicago Fire)
28	MF	GER	Niklas Tauer (to TSV Havelse)
33	GK	GER	Daniel Batz (to Borussia Mönchengladbach)
42	MF	GER	Daniel Gleiber (on loan to 1. FC Saarbrücken)
44	FW	GER	Nelson Weiper (on loan to Sturm Graz)
47	DF	GER	Maxim Dal (to Greuther Fürth)
—	MF	KOR	Hong Hyun-seok (on loan to Midtjylland, previously on loan at Gent)
—	MF	GER	Tom Krauß (to 1. FC Köln, previously on loan)
—	MF	GER	Marco Richter (free agent, previously on loan at Darmstadt 98)
—	FW	GER	Ben Bobzien (to Dynamo Dresden, previously on loan)
—	FW	FRA	Arnaud Nordin (to Rennes, previously on loan)

=== Union Berlin ===
In:

No.	Pos.	Nation	Player
2	DF	GER	Felix Uduokhai (from Beşiktaş)
4	DF	BEL	Zeno Van Den Bosch (from Royal Antwerp)
5	DF	GER	Marvin Friedrich (from Borussia Mönchengladbach)
20	MF	SUI	Michel Aebischer (from Pisa)
29	FW	CIV	Emmanuel Latte Lath (on loan from Atlanta United)
30	MF	SUI	Kastriot Imeri (from Young Boys, previously on loan at Thun)
34	DF	FRA	Stanley Nsoki (from TSG Hoffenheim, previously on loan)

Out:

No.	Pos.	Nation	Player
4	DF	POR	Diogo Leite (free agent)
5	DF	NED	Danilho Doekhi (to Lazio)
10	FW	GER	Ilyas Ansah (to Hull City)
17	FW	GER	David Preu (to VfB Stuttgart II)
30	FW	UKR	Dmytro Bohdanov (on loan to Energie Cottbus)
33	MF	CZE	Alex Král (to Copenhagen)
44	MF	GER	Tim Blaszczak (on loan to FSV Luckenwalde)
—	DF	GER	Leon Prosche (on loan to Erzgebirge Aue)
—	DF	GER	Oluwaseun Ogbemudia (reloan to Waldhof Mannheim)
—	GK	GER	Yannic Stein (to Hansa Rostock, previously on loan at Babelsberg 03)
—	MF	SVK	László Bénes (to Gent, previously on loan at Kayserispor)
—	FW	CIV	Chris Bedia (to Al-Nasr, previously on loan at Young Boys)

=== Borussia Mönchengladbach ===
In:

No.	Pos.	Nation	Player
3	FW	SWE	Isac Lidberg (from Darmstadt 98)
5	DF	POL	Jan Leszczyński (from Legia Warsaw)
6	DF	JPN	Kō Itakura (from Ajax)
8	MF	GER	Enzo Leopold (from Hannover 96)
14	DF	JPN	Daiki Hashioka (on loan from Slavia Prague, previously on loan at Gent)
19	FW	GER	Nicolas Kühn (on loan from Como)
20	DF	GER	David Herold (from Karlsruher SC)
22	DF	UKR	Yukhym Konoplya (from Shakhtar Donetsk)
33	GK	GER	Daniel Batz (from Mainz 05)
38	MF	SWE	Hugo Bolin (from Malmö, previously on loan)
47	MF	JPN	Zento Uno (from Shimizu S-Pulse)

Out:

No.	Pos.	Nation	Player
5	DF	GER	Marvin Friedrich (to Union Berlin)
6	MF	GER	Yannik Engelhardt (loan return to Como)
8	FW	ARG	Alejo Sarco (loan return to Bayer Leverkusen)
13	MF	USA	Giovanni Reyna (to Strasbourg)
14	DF	JPN	Kōta Takai (loan return to Tottenham Hotspur)
15	FW	BIH	Haris Tabaković (loan return to TSG Hoffenheim)
19	MF	CMR	Nathan Ngoumou (to Nice)
27	MF	GER	Rocco Reitz (to RB Leipzig)
30	DF	SUI	Nico Elvedi (to Leeds United)
39	MF	GER	Niklas Swider (on loan to Viktoria Köln)
40	FW	GER	Jan Urbich (on loan to Eintracht Braunschweig)
42	GK	LUX	Tiago Pereira Cardoso (on loan to RAAL La Louvière)
—	FW	CZE	Tomáš Čvančara (on loan to Hradec Králové, previously on loan at Celtic)
—	GK	SUI	Jonas Omlin (to Basel, previously on loan at Bayer Leverkusen)
—	MF	CRO	Noah Pesch (to Rot-Weiss Essen, previously on loan at 1. FC Magdeburg)
—	FW	JPN	Shiō Fukuda (to Karlsruher SC, previously on loan)
—	FW	ARM	Grant-Leon Ranos (to Tenerife, previously on loan at Eintracht Braunschweig)

=== Hamburger SV ===
In:

No.	Pos.	Nation	Player
3	DF	NOR	David Møller Wolfe (on loan from Wolverhampton Wanderers)
4	MF	MAR	Bilal Nadir (from Marseille)
5	MF	FRA	Martin Adeline (from Troyes)
7	DF	MAR	Zakaria El Ouahdi (from Genk)
9	FW	NGR	Terem Moffi (from Nice, previously on loan at Porto)
11	MF	DEN	Albert Grønbæk (from Rennes, previously on loan)
20	MF	POR	Fábio Vieira (from Arsenal, previously on loan)
22	MF	GER	Kofi Amoako (from Dynamo Dresden)
27	FW	ZAM	Patson Daka (from Leicester City)
33	DF	BEL	Sebastiaan Bornauw (on loan from Leeds United)

Out:

No.	Pos.	Nation	Player
2	DF	FRA	William Mikelbrencis (to Darmstadt 98)
3	DF	GER	Noah Katterbach (on loan to Eintracht Braunschweig)
7	MF	FRA	Jean-Luc Dompé (to Konyaspor)
8	DF	LBA	Daniel Elfadli (on loan to LASK)
9	FW	GER	Robert Glatzel (to VfL Wolfsburg)
11	FW	GHA	Ransford Königsdörffer (to Mainz 05)
14	FW	FRA	Rayan Philippe (on loan to SC Paderborn)
16	DF	GEO	Giorgi Gocholeishvili (loan return to Shakhtar Donetsk)
19	FW	USA	Damion Downs (loan return to Southampton)
27	FW	NGR	Philip Otele (loan return to Basel)
40	GK	GER	Hannes Hermann (on loan to Jahn Regensburg)
44	DF	CRO	Luka Vušković (loan return to Tottenham Hotspur)
45	FW	POR	Fábio Baldé (to Strasbourg)
—	DF	FRA	Aboubaka Soumahoro (on loan to Mallorca, previously on loan at Saint-Étienne)
—	MF	POL	Łukasz Poręba (to SV Elversberg, previously on loan)
—	FW	KOS	Emir Sahiti (to Hannover 96, previously on loan at Maccabi Tel Aviv)

=== 1. FC Köln ===
In:

No.	Pos.	Nation	Player
3	DF	CRO	Borna Sosa (on loan from Crystal Palace)
5	MF	GER	Tom Krauß (from Mainz 05, previously on loan)
6	MF	TUN	Ellyes Skhiri (from Eintracht Frankfurt)
11	FW	ENG	Reigan Heskey (from Manchester City)
14	DF	GHA	Gideon Mensah (from Auxerre)
16	FW	POL	Jakub Kamiński (from VfL Wolfsburg, previously on loan)
21	GK	FRA	Martin James (from Paris Saint-Germain)
22	DF	ENG	Jahmai Simpson-Pusey (from Manchester City, previously on loan)
23	MF	AUS	Paul Okon-Engstler (from Sydney FC)
24	DF	GEO	Luka Lochoshvili (from 1. FC Nürnberg)
27	FW	NED	Thijs Dallinga (on loan from Bologna)
31	MF	POR	Gil Neves (from Benfica B)
47	FW	ENG	Mikey Moore (on loan from Tottenham Hotspur, previously on loan at Rangers)

Out:

No.	Pos.	Nation	Player
3	DF	GER	Dominique Heintz (to Fortuna Düsseldorf)
6	MF	GER	Eric Martel (to Mainz 05)
8	MF	BIH	Denis Huseinbašić (to Braga)
11	MF	AUT	Florian Kainz (retired)
15	DF	GER	Luca Kilian (free agent)
16	FW	POL	Jakub Kamiński (to Benfica)
27	MF	PER	Felipe Chávez (loan return to Bayern Munich)
32	DF	USA	Kristoffer Lund (loan return to Palermo)
38	FW	GER	Youssoupha Niang (on loan to FC St. Pauli)
39	DF	TUR	Cenk Özkacar (loan return to Valencia)
40	FW	GER	Fynn Schenten (on loan to Roda JC Kerkrade)
—	DF	GER	Julian Pauli (on loan to OB, previously on loan at Dynamo Dresden)
—	DF	BIH	Jusuf Gazibegović (on loan to Widzew Łódź, previously on loan at Sturm Graz)
—	DF	COD	Elias Bakatukanda (on loan to VfL Osnabrück, previously on loan at Blau-Weiß Linz)
—	DF	DEN	Rasmus Carstensen (to AGF, previously on loan)
—	MF	BIH	Emin Kujović (to Zalaegerszeg, previously on loan at Wolfsberger)

=== Werder Bremen ===
In:

No.	Pos.	Nation	Player
1	GK	EST	Karl Hein (from Arsenal, previously on loan)
3	DF	POL	Oskar Wójcik (from Cracovia)
10	FW	GER	Niclas Füllkrug (on loan from West Ham United, previously on loan at AC Milan)
13	DF	BRA	Arthur (on loan from Bayer Leverkusen)
15	MF	NED	Ludovit Reis (from Club Brugge)
16	DF	SEN	Moussa N'Diaye (on loan from Anderlecht, previously on loan at Schalke 04)
18	FW	TUR	Eren Dinkçi (on loan from SC Freiburg, previously on loan at 1. FC Heidenheim)
19	FW	FRA	Kenny Quetant (from Le Havre)
20	MF	ESP	Chuki (from Valladolid)
23	MF	POL	Dariusz Stalmach (from 1. FC Magdeburg)
26	FW	SUI	Cedric Itten (from Fortuna Düsseldorf)
30	GK	AUT	Alexander Schlager (from Red Bull Salzburg)
34	MF	TUR	Darwin Soylu (from VfL Wolfsburg youth)
44	MF	NED	Youri Regeer (on loan from Ajax)

Out:

No.	Pos.	Nation	Player
7	FW	BEL	Samuel Mbangula (on loan to Bologna)
10	MF	GER	Leonardo Bittencourt (to Energie Cottbus)
18	MF	ESP	Cameron Puertas (loan return to Al-Qadsiah)
19	FW	SRB	Jovan Milošević (loan return to VfB Stuttgart)
20	MF	AUT	Romano Schmid (to Frosinone)
22	DF	ARG	Julián Malatini (on loan to FC Cincinnati)
23	DF	SUI	Isaac Schmidt (loan return to Leeds United)
24	MF	CRO	Patrice Čović (on loan to Dynamo Dresden)
30	GK	GER	Mio Backhaus (to SC Freiburg)
31	DF	GER	Karim Coulibaly (to Strasbourg)
34	MF	GER	Wesley Adeh (on loan to Preußen Münster)
39	DF	AUT	Maximilian Wöber (loan return to Leeds United)
44	FW	NGR	Victor Boniface (loan return to Bayer Leverkusen)
—	MF	GER	Leon Opitz (on loan to VfL Osnabrück, previously on loan at Karlsruher SC)

=== Schalke 04 ===
In:

No.	Pos.	Nation	Player
7	FW	KOR	Hwang Hee-chan (on loan from Wolverhampton Wanderers)
8	DF	GER	Robin Gosens (on loan from Fiorentina)
13	MF	JPN	Satoshi Tanaka (from Fortuna Düsseldorf)
20	FW	AUT	Junior Adamu (from SC Freiburg, previously on loan at Celtic)
22	GK	GER	Kevin Müller (from 1. FC Heidenheim, previously on loan)
29	MF	CMR	Junior Dina Ebimbe (from Eintracht Frankfurt, previously on loan at Brest)
39	DF	AUT	Maximilian Wöber (from Leeds United, previously on loan at Werder Bremen)

Out:

No.	Pos.	Nation	Player
2	DF	ARG	Felipe Sánchez (on loan to Santos Laguna)
3	DF	AUS	Dylan Leonard (on loan to Alemannia Aachen)
7	FW	SEN	Christian Gomis (on loan to Tenerife)
16	DF	SEN	Moussa N'Diaye (loan return to Anderlecht)
18	MF	GHA	Christopher Antwi-Adjei (free agent)
32	GK	GER	Luca Podlech (on loan to Aalesund)
35	FW	GER	Mika Wallentowitz (on loan to Greuther Fürth)
39	FW	GER	Peter Remmert (on loan to MSV Duisburg)
41	DF	GER	Henning Matriciani (free agent)
—	DF	BEL	Martin Wasinski (on loan to Almere City, previously on loan at RFC Liège)
—	FW	FRA	Ilyes Hamache (to Cambuur, previously on loan at Amiens)

=== SV Elversberg ===
In:

No.	Pos.	Nation	Player
7	MF	GER	Maurice Krattenmacher (from Bayern Munich, previously on loan at Hertha BSC)
8	MF	POL	Łukasz Poręba (from Hamburger SV, previously on loan)
9	FW	GER	Noel Futkeu (on loan from Eintracht Frankfurt)
10	MF	GER	Noah Darvich (on loan from VfB Stuttgart)
12	GK	GER	Elias Etringer (from SC Freiburg youth)
26	DF	GER	Luca Sirch (from 1. FC Kaiserslautern)
39	MF	USA	Cole Campbell (from Borussia Dortmund, previously on loan at TSG Hoffenheim)
40	MF	GER	Francis Onyeka (on loan from Bayer Leverkusen, previously on loan at VfL Bochum)

Out:

No.	Pos.	Nation	Player
7	MF	GER	Manuel Feil (free agent)
10	MF	GER	Bambasé Conté (loan return to TSG Hoffenheim)
14	MF	GER	Jarzinho Malanga (loan return to VfB Stuttgart)
18	FW	GER	Mohammad Mahmoud (to Austria Salzburg)
22	MF	SUR	Immanuel Pherai (loan return to Hamburger SV)
23	MF	GER	Carlo Sickinger (to Darmstadt 98)
32	MF	GER	Daniel Pantschenko (to Rot-Weiß Koblenz)
—	MF	GER	Patryk Dragon (retired)
—	MF	GER	Jason Çeka (on loan to Cambuur, previously on loan at Dynamo Dresden)
—	FW	ERI	Filimon Gerezgiher (to Fortuna Düsseldorf, previously on loan at Emmen)

=== SC Paderborn ===
In:

No.	Pos.	Nation	Player
4	DF	GER	Nyamekye Awortwie-Grant (from Energie Cottbus)
6	MF	GER	Tom Baack (from 1. FC Nürnberg)
7	MF	GER	Oliver Batista Meier (from Preußen Münster)
8	MF	BIH	Luka Đurić (from TSG Hoffenheim)
9	FW	FRA	Rayan Philippe (on loan from Hamburger SV)
15	GK	GER	Nahuel Noll (on loan from TSG Hoffenheim, previously on loan at Hannover 96)
18	FW	GER	Marvin Pieringer (from 1. FC Heidenheim)
19	FW	GER	Albert Millgramm (from 1. FC Magdeburg II)
21	DF	GER	Jano ter Horst (from Preußen Münster)
28	MF	GER	Laurin Ulrich (on loan from VfB Stuttgart, previously on loan at 1. FC Magdeburg)
29	DF	GER	Clemens Lippmann (from 1860 Munich)
38	FW	GER	Deniz Zeitler (on loan from TSG Hoffenheim)
40	FW	CRO	Gabriel Vidović (from Dinamo Zagreb)
44	MF	GER	Timur Gayret (from SC Verl)

Out:

No.	Pos.	Nation	Player
4	DF	GER	Calvin Brackelmann (to FC Augsburg)
7	MF	GER	Filip Bilbija (to Derby County)
8	MF	GER	David Kinsombi (to Würzburger Kickers)
9	MF	GER	Nick Bätzner (to Rot-Weiss Essen)
10	FW	GER	Kennedy Okpala (on loan to Dynamo Dresden)
14	MF	GER	Mika Baur (to Celtic)
28	FW	GER	Lucas Copado (to Energie Cottbus)
38	MF	GER	Bennit Bröger (on loan to Fortuna Köln)
41	GK	GER	Dennis Seimen (loan return to VfB Stuttgart)
—	DF	GER	Martin Ens (on loan to MSV Duisburg, previously on loan at SC Verl)
—	FW	GER	Marco Wörner (on loan to Jahn Regensburg, previously on loan at SC Verl)

== 2. Bundesliga ==
Note: Flags indicate national team as has been defined under FIFA eligibility rules. Players may hold more than one non-FIFA nationality.

=== VfL Wolfsburg ===
In:

No.	Pos.	Nation	Player
1	GK	GER	Timon Wellenreuther (from Feyenoord)
6	DF	GER	Hauke Wahl (from FC St. Pauli)
10	FW	SCO	Fraser Hornby (from Darmstadt 98)
11	FW	GER	Fabian Reese (from Hertha BSC)
17	FW	SWE	Alexander Bernhardsson (from Holstein Kiel)
19	FW	GER	Robert Glatzel (from Hamburger SV)
20	MF	GER	Muhammed Damar (from TSG Hoffenheim)
23	FW	SUI	Alessio Besio (from SC Freiburg II, previously on loan at SC Verl)
37	MF	KOS	Elvis Rexhbeçaj (from FC Augsburg)

Out:

No.	Pos.	Nation	Player
1	GK	POL	Kamil Grabara (on loan to Juventus)
3	DF	SVK	Denis Vavro (to Viktoria Plzeň)
4	DF	GRE	Konstantinos Koulierakis (to Roma)
6	DF	FRA	Jeanuël Belocian (loan return to Bayer Leverkusen)
9	FW	ALG	Mohamed Amoura (on loan to Nice)
10	MF	CRO	Lovro Majer (to AEK Athens)
11	FW	DEN	Adam Daghim (loan return to Red Bull Salzburg)
14	DF	NED	Jenson Seelt (loan return to Sunderland)
15	DF	GER	Moritz Jenz (to Young Boys)
17	FW	GER	Dženan Pejčinović (to VfB Stuttgart)
19	MF	DEN	Jesper Lindstrøm (loan return to Napoli)
23	FW	DEN	Jonas Wind (to Braga)
24	MF	DEN	Christian Eriksen (free agent)
29	GK	GER	Marius Müller (to Aberdeen)
34	DF	GER	Till Neininger (on loan to Dynamo Dresden)
39	MF	AUT	Patrick Wimmer (to TSG Hoffenheim)
40	DF	USA	Kevin Paredes (to Utrecht)
41	DF	GER	Jan Bürger (to PEC Zwolle)
—	MF	GER	Elia Dittrich (on loan to Eintracht Trier)
—	FW	DEN	Andreas Skov Olsen (on loan to İstanbul Başakşehir, previously on loan at Rangers)
—	DF	FRA	Nicolas Cozza (to Lausanne-Sport, previously on loan at Nantes)
—	MF	CRO	Bartol Franjić (to Venezia, previously on loan)
—	MF	POL	Eryk Grzywacz (to Holstein Kiel, previously on loan at 1. FC Nürnberg)
—	FW	POL	Jakub Kamiński (to 1. FC Köln, previously on loan)

=== 1. FC Heidenheim ===
In:

No.	Pos.	Nation	Player
8	MF	GER	Paul Hennrich (from TSG Hoffenheim II)
18	FW	SUI	Alessandro Vogt (on loan from TSG Hoffenheim)
22	DF	MAR	Oualid Mhamdi (from SC Verl)
24	FW	GER	Marcel Costly (from FC Ingolstadt)
27	DF	SUI	Michael Heule (from Thun)
33	GK	GER	Thomas Dähne (from 1860 Munich)

Out:

No.	Pos.	Nation	Player
5	DF	GER	Benedikt Gimber (to Granada)
8	FW	TUR	Eren Dinkçi (loan return to SC Freiburg)
9	FW	GER	Stefan Schimmer (to Buriram United)
18	FW	GER	Marvin Pieringer (to SC Paderborn)
21	MF	GER	Adrian Beck (on loan to VfL Osnabrück)
22	MF	GER	Arijon Ibrahimović (loan return to Bayern Munich)
23	DF	GER	Omar Haktab Traoré (to Udinese)
25	DF	SUI	Leonidas Stergiou (loan return to VfB Stuttgart)
26	DF	GER	Hennes Behrens (loan return to TSG Hoffenheim)
30	MF	GER	Niklas Dorsch (to Toronto FC)
33	MF	GER	Nick Rothweiler (on loan to Hessen Kassel)
41	GK	GER	Diant Ramaj (loan return to Borussia Dortmund)
—	MF	GER	Luka Janeš (on loan to Tasmania Berlin, previously on loan at Sonnenhof Großaspach)
—	GK	GER	Kevin Müller (to Schalke 04, previously on loan)
—	DF	GER	Thomas Keller (to Dynamo Dresden, previously on loan)

=== FC St. Pauli ===
In:

No.	Pos.	Nation	Player
2	DF	FIN	Rony Jansson (from Kalmar)
5	MF	ISL	Gísli Þórðarson (on loan from Lech Poznań)
6	DF	DEN	Marcus Mathisen (from 1. FC Magdeburg)
7	FW	GER	Youssoupha Niang (on loan from 1. FC Köln)
10	FW	SWE	Branimir Hrgota (from Greuther Fürth)
22	MF	AUS	Sam Klein (from Brisbane Roar)
33	GK	BUL	Dimitar Mitov (from Aberdeen)

Out:

No.	Pos.	Nation	Player
2	DF	GRE	Manolis Saliakas (to Olympiacos)
3	DF	EST	Karol Mets (to VfL Bochum)
5	DF	GER	Hauke Wahl (to VfL Wolfsburg)
6	MF	USA	James Sands (loan return to New York City FC)
7	MF	AUS	Jackson Irvine (to Cerezo Osaka)
10	MF	LUX	Danel Sinani (to Sampdoria)
14	DF	WAL	Fin Stevens (to Leyton Orient)
22	GK	BIH	Nikola Vasilj (to Al-Diriyah)
27	FW	BEN	Andréas Hountondji (loan return to Burnley)
34	DF	AUT	Jannik Robatsch (on loan to Beveren)
47	GK	CAN	Emil Gazdov (loan return to CF Montréal)

=== Hannover 96 ===
In:

No.	Pos.	Nation	Player
1	GK	SUI	Pascal Loretz (from Luzern)
4	DF	FRA	Jean Hugonet (from 1. FC Magdeburg)
10	MF	GER	Marcel Hartel (from St. Louis City SC)
15	MF	GER	Noël Aséko Nkili (from Bayern Munich, previously on loan)
16	DF	GER	Karl Steinmann (on loan from SC Freiburg)
18	MF	JPN	Daisuke Yokota (from Gent, previously on loan)
24	FW	GER	Yunus Ünal (from Hertha BSC youth)
28	FW	GER	Taycan Etçibaşı (from Borussia Dortmund Youth Sector)
44	FW	KOS	Emir Sahiti (from Hamburger SV, previously on loan at Maccabi Tel Aviv)

Out:

No.	Pos.	Nation	Player
1	GK	GER	Nahuel Noll (loan return to TSG Hoffenheim)
4	DF	GER	Hendry Blank (loan return to Red Bull Salzburg)
6	DF	POL	Maik Nawrocki (loan return to Celtic)
8	MF	GER	Enzo Leopold (to Borussia Mönchengladbach)
10	MF	GER	Noah Weißhaupt (loan return to SC Freiburg)
15	MF	GER	Noël Aséko Nkili (to Bayern Munich)
16	FW	NOR	Håvard Nielsen (free agent)
18	MF	JPN	Daisuke Yokota (to Rangers)
19	DF	FRA	William Kokolo (on loan to Nacional)
24	FW	TUN	Elias Saad (loan return to FC Augsburg)
37	DF	GER	Brooklyn Ezeh (to Dynamo Dresden)
—	GK	GER	Leon-Oumar Wechsel (to Eintracht Trier, previously on loan at Jahn Regensburg)
—	DF	GER	Jonas Sterner (to Dynamo Dresden, previously on loan)
—	MF	GER	Jannik Rochelt (to Arminia Bielefeld, previously on loan)

=== Darmstadt 98 ===
In:

No.	Pos.	Nation	Player
3	DF	GER	Florian Kleinhansl (from 1. FC Kaiserslautern)
4	DF	USA	Grayson Dettoni (from Bayern Munich II, previously on loan)
5	MF	GER	Marco Richter (free agent)
7	MF	GER	Noah Weißhaupt (from SC Freiburg, previously on loan at Hannover 96)
9	FW	KOR	Lee Ho-jae (from Pohang Steelers)
10	MF	BEL	Nicolas Verkooijen (from Jong PSV)
11	FW	MAR	Ibrahim El Kadiri (from De Graafschap)
16	MF	JPN	Hiroki Akiyama (from Albirex Niigata, previously on loan)
22	MF	GER	Lars Kehl (from VfL Osnabrück)
23	MF	GER	Carlo Sickinger (from SV Elversberg)
25	DF	FRA	William Mikelbrencis (from Hamburger SV)
28	DF	GER	Christopher Lannert (from Arminia Bielefeld)
36	FW	NED	Milan Smit (on loan from Stoke City)
41	MF	NED	Lance Duijvestijn (from Sparta Rotterdam, previously on loan at Fortuna Sittard)
49	DF	GER	Yannik Lührs (from TSG Hoffenheim II)

Out:

No.	Pos.	Nation	Player
2	DF	ESP	Sergio López (to Granada)
5	DF	CRO	Matej Maglica (to Kocaelispor)
7	FW	SWE	Isac Lidberg (to Borussia Mönchengladbach)
9	FW	SCO	Fraser Hornby (to VfL Wolfsburg)
22	FW	GER	Serhat-Semih Güler (to Sportfreunde Siegen)
23	MF	GER	Marco Richter (loan return to Mainz 05)
27	FW	POL	Bartosz Białek (to Wieczysta Kraków)
31	MF	GER	Niklas Schmidt (loan return to Toulouse)
32	DF	GER	Fabian Holland (free agent)
34	FW	FRA	Killian Corredor (to Nantes)
—	DF	RUS	Leon Klassen (to Grazer AK, previously on loan)
—	MF	GER	Paul Will (to Greuther Fürth, previously on loan)

=== 1. FC Kaiserslautern ===
In:

No.	Pos.	Nation	Player
3	DF	IRL	Alex Murphy (on loan from Newcastle United)
5	DF	GER	Kelven Frees (on loan from TSG Hoffenheim)
11	FW	MLI	Ibrahim Kanaté (on loan from Anderlecht)
17	FW	TUR	Erencan Yardımcı (on loan from TSG Hoffenheim, previously on loan at Eintracht Braunschweig)
21	MF	SVK	Mário Sauer (on loan from Toulouse)
26	DF	FRA	Paul Joly (from Auxerre, previously on loan)
34	GK	GER	Yannick Onohiol (from TSG Hoffenheim II)
39	FW	AUT	Thierry Tazemeta (from Borussia Dortmund Youth Sector)
45	FW	SRB	Miloš Luković (on loan from Strasbourg, previously on loan at Preston North End)

Out:

No.	Pos.	Nation	Player
3	DF	GER	Florian Kleinhansl (to Darmstadt 98)
5	DF	KOR	Kim Ji-soo (loan return to Brentford)
10	FW	AZE	Mahir Emreli (on loan to Raków Częstochowa)
11	FW	GER	Kenny Prince Redondo (free agent)
13	DF	GER	Erik Wekesser (to Fortuna Düsseldorf)
16	DF	BUL	Atanas Chernev (loan return to Estrela da Amadora)
17	FW	BEL	Norman Bassette (loan return to Coventry City)
19	FW	GER	Daniel Hanslik (to VfL Bochum)
25	GK	ALB	Simon Simoni (loan return to Eintracht Frankfurt)
30	GK	BIH	Avdo Spahić (free agent)
31	DF	GER	Luca Sirch (to SV Elversberg)
—	DF	GER	Frank Ronstadt (free agent, previously on loan at Viktoria Köln)
—	DF	GER	Jannis Heuer (to Greuther Fürth, previously on loan at Preußen Münster)
—	FW	NGR	Dickson Abiama (to Rot-Weiss Essen, previously on loan)
—	FW	GER	Jannik Mause (to Fortuna Köln, previously on loan at Rot-Weiss Essen)
—	FW	GER	Faride Alidou (to Holstein Kiel, previously on loan at Eintracht Braunschweig)

=== Hertha BSC ===
In:

No.	Pos.	Nation	Player
9	FW	SWE	Gustaf Nilsson (on loan from Club Brugge)
19	MF	AUT	Oluwaseun Adewumi (on loan from Burnley, previously on loan at Cercle Brugge)
20	FW	GER	Farid Alfa-Ruprecht (on loan from Bayer Leverkusen, previously on loan at VfL Bochum)
22	DF	DEN	Mads Pedersen (from FC Augsburg)

Out:

No.	Pos.	Nation	Player
1	GK	GER	Tjark Ernst (to Feyenoord)
5	MF	GER	Leon Jensen (to Arminia Bielefeld)
6	MF	GER	Diego Demme (free agebt)
9	FW	POL	Dawid Kownacki (loan return to Werder Bremen)
10	MF	FRA	Michaël Cuisance (to Lens)
11	FW	GER	Fabian Reese (to VfL Wolfsburg)
14	MF	GER	Maurice Krattenmacher (loan return to Bayern Munich)
22	FW	GER	Marten Winkler (to Anderlecht)
23	MF	GER	Kennet Eichhorn (to Bayer Leverkusen)
25	DF	USA	John Brooks (to VSG Altglienicke)
28	MF	GER	Jeremy Dudziak (to Beijing Guoan)
33	DF	POL	Michał Karbownik (to İstanbul Başakşehir)
34	DF	GER	Janne Berner (on loan to SC Verl)
37	DF	GER	Toni Leistner (free agebt)
46	DF	GER	Tim Hoffmann (to SC Verl)
—	FW	DEN	Gustav Christensen (on loan to Kristiansund, previously on loan at FC Ingolstadt)

=== 1. FC Nürnberg ===
In:

No.	Pos.	Nation	Player
4	DF	GRE	Alexis Kalogeropoulos (from Olympiacos)
7	FW	FRA	Rayan Ghrieb (from 1. FC Magdeburg)
9	FW	NOR	Sigurd Haugen (from 1860 Munich)
11	FW	DEN	William Bøving (on loan from Mainz 05)
14	DF	ITA	Andrea Ceresoli (from Atalanta U23, previously on loan at Benevento)
15	DF	SEN	Mikayil Faye (on loan from Rennes, previously on loan at Cremonese)
20	DF	GER	Fynn Otto (from SC Verl)
21	DF	GRE	Giannis Masouras (from Omonia)
28	MF	SYR	Can Moustfa (from Energie Cottbus)
—	MF	GER	Xaver Kiefersauer (from 1860 Munich II)

Out:

No.	Pos.	Nation	Player
3	DF	BRA	Danilo Soares (to Austria Lustenau)
4	DF	PER	Fabio Gruber (to Mainz 05)
5	MF	GER	Tom Baack (to SC Paderborn)
7	FW	MTQ	Mickaël Biron (on loan to Batman Petrolspor)
8	DF	TOG	Henri Koudossou (loan return to FC Augsburg)
17	MF	MAR	Ayoub Chaikhoun (on loan to Wehen Wiesbaden)
19	MF	POL	Eryk Grzywacz (loan return to VfL Wolfsburg)
21	DF	TUR	Berkay Yılmaz (loan return to SC Freiburg)
22	MF	FRA	Rabby Nzingoula (loan return to Strasbourg)
24	DF	GEO	Luka Lochoshvili (to 1. FC Köln)
27	MF	GER	Justin von der Hitz (on loan to Alemannia Aachen)
28	DF	GER	Tarek Buchmann (loan return to Bayern Munich)
37	FW	CGO	Noah Maboulou (on loan to Viktoria Köln)
—	MF	GER	Xaver Kiefersauer (on loan to Würzburger Kickers)
—	GK	SVK	Michal Kukučka (on loan to Jablonec, previously on loan at Koper)
—	FW	GER	Semir Telalović (on loan to Rot-Weiss Essen, previously on loan at Arminia Bielefeld)
—	DF	GER	Jannik Hofmann (to Rot-Weiss Essen, previously on loan)
—	DF	GER	Nick Seidel (to SC Verl, previously on loan at Jahn Regensburg)
—	MF	GER	Florian Flick (to Eintracht Braunschweig, previously on loan)
—	FW	GER	Dustin Forkel (to Rot-Weiß Erfurt, previously on loan at Schweinfurt 05)

=== VfL Bochum ===
In:

No.	Pos.	Nation	Player
2	DF	SUR	Sean Klaiber (from Brøndby)
4	DF	TUR	Yiğit Karademir (from VfL Osnabrück)
5	DF	EST	Karol Mets (from FC St. Pauli)
6	MF	ALB	Enis Çokaj (from Panathinaikos, previously on loan at Levadiakos)
7	FW	DEN	Christian Rasmussen (from Fortuna Düsseldorf)
8	DF	GER	Jean-Manuel Mbom (from Viborg)
10	MF	GER	Berkan Taz (from SC Verl)
14	MF	BEL	Jarne Steuckers (on loan from Genk)
15	DF	AUT	Michael Steinwender (from Heart of Midlothian)
16	GK	AUT	Tino Casali (from Rot-Weiss Essen)
19	FW	GER	Daniel Hanslik (from 1. FC Kaiserslautern)
27	FW	GER	Babis Drakas (from Borussia Dortmund II)
28	MF	ENG	Charlie Patiño (on loan from Deportivo A Coruña)
29	FW	TOG	Mansour Ouro-Tagba (from 1. FC Köln II, previously on loan at VfB Stuttgart II)
31	DF	GER	Leon Sawas (from SC Freiburg youth)

Out:

No.	Pos.	Nation	Player
4	DF	SRB	Erhan Mašović (to Vojvodina)
7	DF	GER	Kevin Vogt (retired)
8	MF	GER	Kjell Wätjen (loan return to Borussia Dortmund)
9	FW	MLI	Ibrahim Sissoko (to Muğlaspor)
11	MF	GER	Moritz-Broni Kwarteng (to 1. FC Magdeburg)
16	FW	NIR	Callum Marshall (loan return to West Ham United)
18	DF	NOR	Mikkel Rakneberg (on loan to OB)
19	MF	SVK	Matúš Bero (to Ferencváros)
20	DF	SUI	Noah Loosli (to Universitatea Cluj)
21	MF	GER	Francis Onyeka (loan return to Bayer Leverkusen)
22	GK	GER	Niclas Thiede (to ADO Den Haag)
25	DF	GER	Daniel Hülsenbusch (to SSV Ulm)
26	FW	GER	Romario Rösch (to Preußen Münster)
29	FW	GER	Farid Alfa-Ruprecht (loan return to Bayer Leverkusen)
30	DF	GER	Darnell Keumo (on loan to Waldhof Mannheim)
31	MF	GER	Marcel Sobottka (free agent)
34	MF	GER	Cajetan Lenz (to TSG Hoffenheim)
35	DF	GER	Kacper Koscierski (on loan to Alemannia Aachen)
39	DF	GER	Leandro Morgalla (loan return to Red Bull Salzburg)
—	FW	FRA	Mathis Clairicia (to Sochaux, previously on loan at Alverca)
—	FW	GER	Samuel Bamba (to Marítimo, previously on loan at Willem II)

=== Karlsruher SC ===
In:

No.	Pos.	Nation	Player
3	DF	TUR	Deniz Ofli (on loan from Bayern Munich II)
4	DF	BRA	Héliton (from Göztepe)
6	MF	FIN	Santeri Väänänen (from Rosenborg)
7	MF	GER	Kevin Wiethaup (from VfL Osnabrück)
9	FW	GER	Moritz Broschinski (on loan from Basel)
11	FW	GER	Noel Eichinger (from Jahn Regensburg)
13	FW	JPN	Shiō Fukuda (from Borussia Mönchengladbach, previously on loan)
15	DF	GER	Paul Scholl (from Bayern Munich II, previously on loan)
18	GK	GER	Ferdinand Gebert (from Astoria Walldorf)
19	FW	TUN	Louey Ben Farhat (on loan from SC Freiburg)
23	MF	ALB	Tim Civeja (from 1. FC Saarbrücken)
24	DF	MAD	Sandro Trémoulet (from Radnik Surdulica)
33	DF	SWE	Viktor Bergh (from Djurgården, previously on loan at Hansa Rostock)
37	FW	ITA	Jason Ponente-Ramirez (from 1. FC Köln youth)

Out:

No.	Pos.	Nation	Player
4	DF	GER	Marcel Beifus (free agent)
5	DF	GHA	Stephan Ambrosius (loan return to St. Gallen)
6	MF	GER	Nicolai Rapp (to Dynamo Dresden)
7	MF	BIH	Dženis Burnić (to Volos)
9	FW	CRO	Roko Šimić (loan return to Cardiff City)
11	MF	GER	Philipp Förster (to Fortuna Düsseldorf)
16	MF	GER	Andreas Müller (on loan to Fortuna Düsseldorf)
17	MF	GER	Leon Opitz (loan return to Werder Bremen)
18	GK	GER	Aki Koch (to Machida Zelvia)
19	FW	TUN	Louey Ben Farhat (to SC Freiburg)
20	DF	GER	David Herold (to Borussia Mönchengladbach)
21	MF	GER	Meiko Wäschenbach (to Alemannia Aachen)
24	FW	GER	Fabian Schleusener (to Fortuna Düsseldorf)
27	FW	TUR	Ali-Eren Ersungur (to VSG Altglienicke)
29	DF	GER	Niclas Dühring (on loan to SV Drochtersen/Assel)
34	MF	GER	Mateo Kritzer (on loan to Eintracht Trier)
38	MF	TUR	Efe-Kaan Sihlaroğlu (to Iğdır)
—	MF	SUI	Noah Rupp (to Wil, previously on loan at Thun)

=== Dynamo Dresden ===
In:

No.	Pos.	Nation	Player
4	DF	GER	Kenneth Schmidt (from Fortuna Düsseldorf)
6	MF	GER	Nicolai Rapp (from Karlsruher SC)
7	FW	GER	Kennedy Okpala (on loan from SC Paderborn)
11	FW	TUR	Kaan İnanoğlu (from Eintracht Frankfurt II, previously on loan at FC Homburg)
14	DF	GER	Brooklyn Ezeh (from Hannover 96)
17	DF	AUT	Ahmet Muhamedbegović (from Olimpija Ljubljana)
18	MF	GER	Robert Wagner (from SC Freiburg, previously on loan)
20	FW	GER	Ben Bobzien (from Mainz 05, previously on loan)
21	MF	GER	Tobias Raschl (from Preußen Münster)
24	MF	CRO	Patrice Čović (on loan from Werder Bremen)
32	DF	GER	Jonas Sterner (from Hannover 96, previously on loan)
34	DF	GER	Till Neininger (on loan from VfL Wolfsburg)
39	DF	GER	Thomas Keller (from 1. FC Heidenheim, previously on loan)
44	DF	ITA	Simon Straudi (from Energie Cottbus)

Out:

No.	Pos.	Nation	Player
2	DF	GER	Konrad Faber (loan return to St. Gallen)
5	MF	GER	Vinko Šapina (to FC Ingolstadt)
6	MF	GER	Kofi Amoako (to Hamburger SV)
7	MF	GER	Jason Çeka (loan return to SV Elversberg)
13	DF	GER	Julian Pauli (loan return to 1. FC Köln)
15	DF	SRI	Claudio Kammerknecht (to Waldhof Mannheim)
24	MF	GER	Tony Menzel (on loan to Rot-Weiss Essen)
26	DF	GER	Jan-Hendrik Marx (to Kickers Offenbach)
28	DF	GER	Sascha Risch (to Fortuna Düsseldorf)
30	FW	GER	Stefan Kutschke (retired)
—	FW	GER	Marlon Faß (on loan to Sonnenhof Großaspach, previously on loan at Stuttgarter Kickers)
—	DF	GER	Paul Lehmann (to SC Verl, previously on loan)
—	DF	GER	Dennis Duah (to TSV Havelse, previously on loan)
—	MF	GER	Jonas Oehmichen (to Alemannia Aachen, previously on loan)
—	FW	GER	Robin Meißner (to VfL Osnabrück, previously on loan)
—	FW	GER	Dominik Kother (to MSV Duisburg, previously on loan)

=== Holstein Kiel ===
In:

No.	Pos.	Nation	Player
3	DF	JPN	Niko Takahashi (on loan from Cerezo Osaka, previously on loan at Almere City)
4	DF	GER	Sebastian Schonlau (from Vancouver Whitecaps)
5	DF	DEN	Noah Madsen (from Maritimo)
8	MF	ARG	Guillermo Balzi (from Newell's Old Boys, previously on loan at Levadiakos)
9	FW	GEO	Giorgi Kvilitaia (from Metz)
11	FW	NED	Gyan de Regt (from Excelsior)
17	FW	GER	Faride Alidou (from 1. FC Kaiserslautern, previously on loan at Eintracht Braunschweig)
22	MF	GER	Moritz Reimers (from Hamburger SV II)
24	MF	JPN	Taisei Abe (on loan from V-Varen Nagasaki, previously on loan at Luzern)
32	DF	JPN	Hiroki Sekine (on loan from Reims)
49	GK	LUX	Ben Schmit (from Eintracht Trier)
—	MF	POL	Eryk Grzywacz (from VfL Wolfsburg, previously on loan at 1. FC Nürnberg)

Out:

No.	Pos.	Nation	Player
3	DF	GER	Marco Komenda (to Arka Gdynia)
4	DF	GER	Patrick Erras (retired)
5	DF	SWE	Carl Johansson (free agent)
6	DF	SRB	Marko Ivezić (to Hibernian)
8	MF	GER	Umut Tohumcu (loan return to TSG Hoffenheim)
11	FW	SWE	Alexander Bernhardsson (to VfL Wolfsburg)
18	FW	SLO	Aldin Jakupović (on loan to Bravo)
21	GK	GER	Jonas Krumrey (on loan to VfL Osnabrück)
22	MF	AUT	Stefan Schwab (to SV Ried)
25	FW	GER	Marcus Müller (on loan to Wehen Wiesbaden)
29	DF	GER	Niklas Niehoff (on loan to SCR Altach)
42	GK	TUR	Tyler Doğan (to TSV Steinbach)
—	MF	POL	Eryk Grzywacz (on loan to TSV Havelse)
—	DF	BIH	Mladen Cvjetinović (on loan to 1. FC Saarbrücken, previously on loan at Energie Cottbus)
—	MF	GER	Luca Prasse (on loan to SV Meppen, previously on loan at FSV Zwickau)
—	DF	POL	Tymoteusz Puchacz (to Sabah, previously on loan)
—	DF	GER	Max Geschwill (to Rot-Weiss Essen, previously on loan at 1. FC Magdeburg)
—	FW	GER	Louis Köster (to Alemannia Aachen, previously on loan at VfL Bochum II)

=== Arminia Bielefeld ===
In:

No.	Pos.	Nation	Player
5	DF	GER	Maximilian Bauer (from FC Augsburg, previously on loan)
7	DF	TOG	Henri Koudossou (from FC Augsburg, previously on loan at 1. FC Nürnberg)
9	FW	NED	David Min (on loan from Utrecht)
10	MF	GER	Jannik Rochelt (from Hannover 96, previously on loan)
31	MF	GER	Leon Jensen (from Hertha BSC)

Out:

No.	Pos.	Nation	Player
6	MF	USA	Mael Corboz (to Grenoble)
7	FW	GER	Semir Telalović (loan return to 1. FC Nürnberg)
24	DF	GER	Christopher Lannert (to Darmstadt 98)
28	FW	LAT	Roberts Uldriķis (to Heerenveen)
31	DF	GER	Robin Knoche (free agent)
36	DF	GER	Justin Lukas (to FC Gütersloh)
37	MF	GER	Noah Sarenren Bazee (to Waldhof Mannheim)
—	DF	GER	Max Lippert (to 1. FC Köln II, previously on loan)
—	FW	GER	Mika Schroers (to Alemannia Aachen, previously on loan)
—	FW	GER	Julian Kania (to De Graafschap, previously on loan at VfL Osnabrück)

=== 1. FC Magdeburg ===
In:

No.	Pos.	Nation	Player
3	DF	IRL	Anselmo García MacNulty (from PEC Zwolle)
6	DF	GER	Paul Jaeckel (from Preußen Münster)
8	FW	GER	Emmanuel Iyoha (from Fortuna Düsseldorf)
9	FW	CRO	Roko Šimić (on loan from Cardiff City, previously on loan at Karlsruher SC)
10	MF	GER	Moritz-Broni Kwarteng (from VfL Bochum)
11	MF	PER	Felipe Chávez (on loan from Bayern Munich, previously on loan at 1. FC Köln)
14	MF	GER	Tony Reitz (from Borussia Dortmund II)
18	FW	KOR	Lee Chung-hyun (on loan from Bucheon)
20	FW	GER	Kevin Manthey (from Werder Bremen II)
26	MF	GER	Torben Müsel (from Rot-Weiss Essen)
27	MF	KOR	Yoon Do-young (on loan from Brighton & Hove Albion, previously on loan at Dordrecht)

Out:

No.	Pos.	Nation	Player
2	DF	FRA	Samuel Loric (free agent)
6	MF	POL	Dariusz Stalmach (to Werder Bremen)
8	MF	GER	Laurin Ulrich (loan return to VfB Stuttgart)
9	FW	GER	Maximilian Breunig (loan return to 1. FC Heidenheim)
10	MF	CRO	Noah Pesch (loan return to Borussia Mönchengladbach)
11	FW	SWE	Alexander Ahl Holmström (to OB)
13	MF	GER	Connor Krempicki (to Borussia Dortmund II)
16	DF	DEN	Marcus Mathisen (to FC St. Pauli)
24	DF	FRA	Jean Hugonet (to Hannover 96)
25	MF	CIV	Silas Gnaka (to ML Vitebsk)
26	FW	MNE	Aleksa Marušić (to Radnički 1923)
27	DF	GER	Philipp Hercher (to Wehen Wiesbaden)
28	DF	GER	Max Geschwill (loan return to Holstein Kiel)
29	FW	FRA	Rayan Ghrieb (to 1. FC Nürnberg)
31	FW	GER	Robert Leipertz (to Greifswalder FC)

=== Eintracht Braunschweig ===
In:

No.	Pos.	Nation	Player
3	DF	GER	Noah Katterbach (on loan from Hamburger SV)
5	DF	GER	Frederik Jäkel (from RB Leipzig, previously on loan)
6	MF	GER	Florian Flick (from 1. FC Nürnberg, previously on loan)
7	MF	GER	Yann Sturm (from SC Freiburg II, previously on loan at FC Ingolstadt)
9	FW	AUT	Maximilian Entrup (from LASK)
10	MF	GER	Samuele Di Benedetto (from VfB Stuttgart II)
19	FW	SUI	Arlet Junior Zé (from Basel, previously on loan at Midtjylland)
23	DF	GRE	Isidoros Koutsidis (from Olympiacos B)
26	MF	GER	Tristan Wagner (from Greifswalder FC)
27	FW	GER	Jan Urbich (on loan from Borussia Mönchengladbach)
32	GK	GER	Benjamin Uphoff (from Hansa Rostock)
33	GK	GER	Nick Bodon (from Schalke 04 youth)
43	DF	AUT	Damjan Kovačević (from TSV Hartberg)

Out:

No.	Pos.	Nation	Player
3	DF	GER	Patrick Nkoa (to RAAL La Louvière)
7	MF	GER	Fabio Kaufmann (to BG Pathum United)
9	FW	TUR	Erencan Yardımcı (loan return to TSG Hoffenheim)
10	FW	GER	Faride Alidou (loan return to 1. FC Kaiserslautern)
13	GK	ALB	Elhan Kastrati (to Athens Kallithea)
16	DF	GER	Louis Breunig (on loan to Würzburger Kickers)
18	MF	GER	Anas Bakhat (free agent)
19	DF	CMR	Leon Bell Bell (free agent)
25	FW	ARM	Grant-Leon Ranos (loan return to Borussia Mönchengladbach)
33	GK	SUI	Marko Rajkovačić (to Würzburger Kickers)
38	FW	GER	Ken Izekor (loan return to Bayer Leverkusen)
44	MF	USA	Johan Gomez (to Chicago Fire)
—	MF	GER	Jona Borsum (on loan to SV Meppen, previously on loan at Kickers Offenbach)
—	GK	GER	Justin Duda (to 1. FC Lokomotive Leipzig, previously on loan at SG Barockstadt)
—	MF	NED	Walid Ould-Chikh (to Heracles Almelo, previously on loan)

=== Greuther Fürth ===
In:

No.	Pos.	Nation	Player
1	GK	GER	Florian Hellstern (on loan from VfB Stuttgart)
4	DF	ALG	Elias Benkara (on loan from Borussia Dortmund II)
5	DF	GER	Maxim Dal (from Mainz 05)
8	MF	GER	Shinta Appelkamp (from Fortuna Düsseldorf)
9	FW	USA	Jordan Pefok (from Reims, previously on loan at Tondela)
10	MF	GER	Ole Pohlmann (from Rio Ave)
13	MF	GER	Paul Will (from Darmstadt 98, previously on loan)
18	MF	EGY	Omar Megeed (from Hamburger SV II)
19	FW	GER	Benjamin Zank (from Viktoria Köln)
20	DF	SUI	Loris Giandomenico (on loan from Grasshoppers, previously on loan at Rapperswil-Jona)
21	FW	GER	Mika Wallentowitz (on loan from Schalke 04)
22	DF	GER	Jannis Heuer (from 1. FC Kaiserslautern, previously on loan at Preußen Münster)
29	DF	HUN	Krisztián Keresztes (on loan from Nyíregyháza, previously on loan at Dundee United)
34	DF	GER	Hendry Blank (on loan from Red Bull Salzburg, previously on loan at Hannover 96)
37	MF	KOS	Faton Ademi (from Alemannia Aachen)
39	GK	GER	Christian Ortag (from SSV Ulm)

Out:

No.	Pos.	Nation	Player
1	GK	GER	Nils Körber (free agent)
4	DF	GER	Philipp Ziereis (to Melbourne Victory)
5	DF	GER	Reno Münz (to Westerlo)
9	FW	GER	Noel Futkeu (to Eintracht Frankfurt)
10	FW	SWE	Branimir Hrgota (to FC St. Pauli)
11	FW	LUX	Aiman Dardari (loan return to FC Augsburg)
14	MF	GER	Jomaine Consbruch (to Fortuna Düsseldorf)
15	DF	SUI	Jan Elvedi (loan return to 1. FC Kaiserslautern)
17	DF	GER	Noah König (on loan to SC Verl)
18	FW	GER	Felix Higl (to Preußen Münster)
21	GK	GER	Timo Schlieck (loan return to RB Leipzig)
22	MF	URU	Juan Ignacio Cabrera (to Vaduz)
24	MF	GER	Marco John (free agent)
25	DF	ISL	Brynjar Ingi Bjarnason (to Sønderjyske)
26	GK	NED	Pelle Boevink (to Groningen)
33	DF	USA	Maximilian Dietz (to Górnik Zabrze)
37	MF	USA	Julian Green (free agent)
40	DF	GER	David Abrangao (on loan to Würzburger Kickers)
45	MF	POR	Keyan Varela (loan return to Servette)
47	MF	TUN	Sayfallah Ltaief (loan return to Twente)
—	GK	GER	Sebastian Jung (on loan to FSV Zwickau, previously on loan at Komárno)
—	DF	GER	Matti Wagner (to Alemannia Aachen, previously on loan)
—	MF	GER	Leander Popp (to SSV Ulm, previously on loan at Viktoria Köln)
—	MF	LUX	Mathias Olesen (to Sønderjyske, previously on loan at Grazer AK)

=== VfL Osnabrück ===
In:

No.	Pos.	Nation	Player
4	DF	ISR	Joel Abu Hanna (from Levadiakos)
5	MF	GER	Jonathan Wensing (from SV Meppen)
7	MF	GHA	Daniel-Kofi Kyereh (from SC Freiburg)
8	MF	GER	Leonhard Münst (from Viktoria Köln)
11	FW	GER	Robin Meißner (from Dynamo Dresden, previously on loan)
17	FW	GER	Luca Raimund (from Fortuna Düsseldorf)
18	MF	USA	Leon Flach (on loan from Jagiellonia Białystok)
19	MF	GER	Leon Opitz (on loan from Werder Bremen, previously on loan at Karlsruher SC)
21	MF	GER	Adrian Beck (on loan from 1. FC Heidenheim)
28	DF	GER	Konrad Faber (from St. Gallen, previously on loan at Dynamo Dresden)
32	GK	GER	Jonas Krumrey (on loan from Holstein Kiel)
38	DF	COD	Elias Bakatukanda (on loan from 1. FC Köln, previously on loan at Blau-Weiß Linz)
42	DF	USA	Jonathan Gómez (on loan from PAOK, previously on loan at Albacete)
—	DF	GER	Lukas Bornschein (from Hamburger SV II)

Out:

No.	Pos.	Nation	Player
3	DF	DEN	Frederik Christensen (loan return to Brommapojkarna)
4	DF	TUR	Yiğit Karademir (to VfL Bochum)
7	DF	KOS	Bashkim Ajdini (retired)
8	MF	GER	Robert Tesche (retired)
9	FW	GER	Julian Kania (loan return to Arminia Bielefeld)
10	FW	GER	Kai Pröger (to VfB Oldenburg)
13	DF	GER	Kevin Schumacher (to TSV Havelse)
14	FW	GER	Luc Ihorst (to Kickers Emden)
18	MF	GER	Lars Kehl (to Darmstadt 98)
19	MF	GER	Kevin Wiethaup (to Karlsruher SC)
21	GK	SWE	Lukas Jonsson (to Djurgården)
29	MF	POL	David Kopacz (to Hansa Rostock)
35	GK	GER	Mats Remberg (to 1. FC Bocholt)
—	DF	GER	Lukas Bornschein (on loan to Fortuna Düsseldorf)
—	DF	GER	Lion Semić (on loan to Greifswalder FC, previously on loan at Helmond Sport)
—	DF	GER	Ibrahim Touray (on loan to Kickers Emden, previously on loan at SSV Jeddeloh)
—	MF	GER	Rohin Shivani (on loan to Sportfreunde Lotte, previously on loan at VfB Lübeck)
—	FW	GER	Finn Cramer (to BFC Preussen, previously on loan at SSV Jeddeloh)

=== Energie Cottbus ===
In:

No.	Pos.	Nation	Player
1	GK	GER	Marcel Lotka (from Fortuna Düsseldorf)
2	DF	GER	King Manu (from Fortuna Düsseldorf, previously on loan)
7	MF	GER	Christian Kinsombi (from Hansa Rostock)
9	FW	GER	Lucas Copado (from SC Paderborn)
13	FW	UKR	Dmytro Bohdanov (on loan from Union Berlin)
16	DF	USA	Ryan Malone (from Erzgebirge Aue)
17	MF	GER	Julian Guttau (from Erzgebirge Aue)
21	DF	GER	Luca Erlein (on loan from Bayer Leverkusen)
23	DF	MLI	Fousseny Doumbia (on loan from Eintracht Frankfurt II)
29	GK	GER	Kevin Kratzsch (from Rot-Weiß Oberhausen)
32	MF	GER	Leonardo Bittencourt (from Werder Bremen)
—	MF	GER	Yusuf Wardak (from Waldhof Mannheim, previously on loan at VfB Lübeck)

Out:

No.	Pos.	Nation	Player
1	GK	GER	Alexander Sebald (retired)
7	FW	GER	Timmy Thiele (free agent)
14	MF	TUR	Tolga Ciğerci (to VSG Altglienicke)
17	MF	SYR	Can Moustfa (to 1. FC Nürnberg)
21	DF	GAM	Leon Guwara (free agent)
22	DF	BIH	Mladen Cvjetinović (loan return to Holstein Kiel)
23	DF	GER	Nyamekye Awortwie-Grant (to SC Paderborn)
25	FW	GER	Ted Tattermusch (to VSG Altglienicke)
27	DF	GER	Dennis Slamar (to Chemnitzer FC)
32	MF	GER	Finn Heidrich (to Erzgebirge Aue)
33	GK	GER	Marius Funk (to VfB Stuttgart)
36	MF	GER	Janis Juckel (to Greifswalder FC)
37	MF	GER	Merveille Biankadi (free agent)
44	DF	ITA	Simon Straudi (to Dynamo Dresden)
—	MF	GER	Yusuf Wardak (on loan to TSV Havelse)
—	DF	GER	Gianluca Pelzer (on loan to Eintracht Trier, previously on loan at VfB Lübeck)

== See also ==
- 2026–27 Bundesliga
- 2026–27 2. Bundesliga
