= 2026–27 TSG 1899 Hoffenheim season =

TSG 1899 Hoffenheim
2026–27 season
- Owner: Dietmar Hopp
- President: Jörg Albrecht
- Head coach: Christian Ilzer
- Stadium: Rhein-Neckar-Arena
- Bundesliga: 17th
- DFB-Pokal: Second round
- UEFA Europa League: League phase
| Home colours | Away colours | Third colours |

The 2026–27 season is the 128th season in the history of TSG 1899 Hoffenheim, and the club's 19th consecutive season in the Bundesliga. In addition to the domestic league, the club is participating in the DFB-Pokal and the UEFA Europa League.

== Players ==
=== First-team squad ===
As of 1 September 2026

Note: Flags indicate national team as defined under FIFA eligibility rules; some limited exceptions apply. Players may hold more than one non-FIFA nationality.

| No. | Pos. | Nation | Player |
|---|---|---|---|
| 1 | GK | GER | Oliver Baumann (captain) |
| 2 | DF | CZE | Robin Hranáč |
| 4 | DF | GER | Sean Dulic |
| 5 | DF | TUR | Ozan Kabak |
| 7 | MF | KOS | Leon Avdullahu |
| 8 | MF | AUT | Patrick Wimmer |
| 9 | FW | GER | Max Moerstedt |
| 10 | FW | CZE | Adam Hložek |
| 11 | FW | KOS | Fisnik Asllani |
| 13 | DF | BRA | Bernardo |
| 14 | FW | DEN | Adam Daghim |
| 15 | DF | FRA | Valentin Gendrey |
| 16 | MF | GER | Luis Engelns |
| 17 | MF | BEL | Nathan De Cat |

| No. | Pos. | Nation | Player |
|---|---|---|---|
| 18 | MF | NED | Wouter Burger |
| 19 | FW | GER | Tim Lemperle |
| 20 | MF | GER | Bambasé Conté |
| 21 | DF | KOS | Albian Hajdari |
| 22 | MF | AUT | Alexander Prass |
| 27 | FW | CRO | Andrej Kramarić |
| 28 | DF | JPN | Kōki Machida |
| 29 | DF | GER | Natnael Abraha |
| 32 | MF | GER | Cajetan Lenz |
| 34 | DF | CZE | Vladimír Coufal |
| 36 | GK | ISL | Lúkas Petersson |
| 37 | GK | GER | Luca Philipp |
| 39 | DF | NED | Mats Rots |

=== Out on loan ===
Note: Flags indicate national team as defined under FIFA eligibility rules; some limited exceptions apply. Players may hold more than one non-FIFA nationality.

| No. | Pos. | Nation | Player |
|---|---|---|---|
| — | GK | GER | Nahuel Noll (at SC Paderborn until 30 June 2027) |
| — | DF | BRA | Arthur Chaves (at Botafogo until 31 December 2027) |
| — | DF | NGR | Emmanuel Chukwu (at Austria Lustenau until 30 June 2027) |
| — | DF | GER | Kelven Frees (at 1. FC Kaiserslautern until 30 June 2027) |
| — | MF | GER | Umut Tohumcu (at Red Bull Salzburg until 30 June 2027) |
| — | FW | NGR | Precious Benjamin (at Austria Lustenau until 30 June 2027) |

| No. | Pos. | Nation | Player |
|---|---|---|---|
| — | FW | CZE | Yannick Eduardo (at ADO Den Haag until 30 June 2027) |
| — | FW | NGR | Gift Orban (at Amedspor until 30 June 2027) |
| — | FW | SUI | Alessandro Vogt (at 1. FC Heidenheim until 30 June 2027) |
| — | FW | TUR | Erencan Yardımcı (at 1. FC Kaiserslautern until 30 June 2027) |
| — | FW | GER | Deniz Zeitler ( at SC Paderborn until 30 June 2027) |

== Transfers ==
=== In ===
| Date | Pos. | Nat. | Player | From | Fee | Ref. |
|---|---|---|---|---|---|---|
| 19 May 2026 | MF | (Germany) | Cajetan Lenz | (Germany) VfL Bochum | Transfer | |
| 3 June 2026 | MF | (Austria) | Patrick Wimmer | (Germany) VfL Wolfsburg | Transfer | |
| 9 June 2026 | DF | (Netherlands) | Mats Rots | (Netherlands) Twente | €16 million | |
| 10 July 2026 | MF | (Belgium) | Nathan De Cat | (Belgium) Anderlecht | €20 million | |
| 2 August 2026 | MF | (Denmark) | Adam Daghim | (Austria) Red Bull Salzburg | Free transfer | |

==== Loans in ====
| Date | Pos. | Nat. | Player | From | Duration | Ref. |

=== Out ===
| Date | Pos. | Nat. | Player | To | Fee | Ref. |
|---|---|---|---|---|---|---|
| 28 May 2026 | MF | (Germany) | Luka Đurić | (Germany) SC Paderborn | Transfer | |
| 1 July 2026 | DF | (France) | Stanley Nsoki | (Germany) Union Berlin | Transfer | |
| 5 July 2026 | FW | (Ivory Coast) | Bazoumana Touré | (England) Newcastle United | £42 million | |
| 11 July 2026 | FW | (Bosnia and Herzegovina) | Haris Tabaković | (Austria) Red Bull Salzburg | Transfer | |
| 13 July 2026 | DF | (Germany) | Hennes Behrens | (Germany) FC Augsburg | Transfer | |
| 23 July 2026 | MF | (Germany) | Muhammed Damar | (Germany) VfL Wolfsburg | Transfer | |
| 25 July 2026 | DF | (Germany) | Luca Erlein | (Germany) Bayer Leverkusen | Transfer | |

==== Loans out ====
| Date | Pos. | Nat. | Player | To | Duration | Ref. |
|---|---|---|---|---|---|---|
| 26 June 2026 | GK | (Germany) | Nahuel Noll | (Germany) SC Paderborn | End of season | |
| 30 June 2026 | FW | (Nigeria) | Precious Benjamin | Austria Lustenau | End of season | |
| 1 July 2026 | DF | (Nigeria) | Emmanuel Chukwu | Austria Lustenau | End of season | |
| 7 July 2026 | DF | (Germany) | Kelven Frees | (Germany) 1. FC Kaiserslautern | End of season | |
| 18 July 2026 | FW | (Turkey) | Erencan Yardımcı | (Germany) 1. FC Kaiserslautern | End of season | |
| 20 July 2026 | FW | (Czech Republic) | Yannick Eduardo | (Netherlands) ADO Den Haag | End of season | |
| 25 July 2026 | FW | (Nigeria) | Gift Orban | (Turkey) Amedspor | End of season | |
| 14 August 2026 | DF | (Germany) | Umut Tohumcu | (Austria) Red Bull Salzburg | End of season | |
| 31 August 2026 | FW | (Switzerland) | Alessandro Vogt | (Germany) 1. FC Heidenheim | End of season | |
| 4 September 2026 | DF | (Brazil) | Arthur Chaves | (Brazil) Botafogo | End of season | |

== Competitions ==
=== Overall record ===
| Competition | First match | Last match | Starting round | Final position | Record | | | | | | | |
| Competition | First match | Last match | Starting round | Final position | Pld | W | D | L | GF | GA | GD | Win % |
|---|---|---|---|---|---|---|---|---|---|---|---|---|
| Bundesliga | 29 August 2026 | 22 May 2027 | Matchday 1 | TBD | 5 | 1 | 0 | 4 | 9 | 13 | −4 | 20.00 |
| DFB-Pokal | 22 August 2026 | TBD | First round | TBD | 1 | 1 | 0 | 0 | 4 | 0 | +4 | 100.00 |
| UEFA Europa League | 17 September 2026 | TBD | League phase | TBD | 2 | 0 | 0 | 2 | 2 | 5 | −3 | 0.00 |
| Total | | | | | 8 | 2 | 0 | 6 | 15 | 18 | −3 | 25.00 |

Last updated: 15 October 2026
Source: Soccerway

=== Bundesliga ===
==== League table ====
| Pos | Team | Pld | W | D | L | GF | GA | GD | Pts |
|---|---|---|---|---|---|---|---|---|---|
| 8 | SV Elversberg | 10 | 4 | 1 | 5 | 17 | 19 | −2 | 13 |
| 9 | VfB Stuttgart | 9 | 4 | 0 | 5 | 15 | 15 | 0 | 12 |
| 10 | TSG Hoffenheim | 10 | 4 | 0 | 6 | 16 | 18 | −2 | 12 |
| 11 | Hamburger SV | 9 | 4 | 0 | 5 | 10 | 20 | −10 | 12 |
| 12 | Mainz 05 | 9 | 3 | 1 | 5 | 18 | 19 | −1 | 10 |

Updated to match(es) played on 21 November 2026. Source: Bundesliga
Rules for classification: 1) Points; 2) Goal difference; 3) Goals scored; 4) Head-to-head aggregate results; 5) Head-to-head away goals scored; 6) Away goals scored; 7) Play-off at neutral site.
(Rules 4–6 only apply after all home-and-away matches have been played between the tied teams. Rule 7 only applies after the completion of the season.)

==== Results summary ====
| Overall | | | | | | | | Home | | | | | | Away | | | | | |
| Pld | W | D | L | GF | GA | GD | Pts | W | D | L | GF | GA | GD | W | D | L | GF | GA | GD |
|---|---|---|---|---|---|---|---|---|---|---|---|---|---|---|---|---|---|---|---|
| 10 | 4 | 0 | 6 | 16 | 18 | −2 | 12 | 3 | 0 | 2 | 11 | 8 | +3 | 1 | 0 | 4 | 5 | 10 | −5 |

Last updated: 21 November 2026.
Source: DFB

==== Results by round ====
| Round | 1 | 2 | 3 | 4 | 5 | 6 | 7 | 8 | 9 | 10 | 11 | 12 | 13 | 14 | 15 | 16 | 17 | 18 | 19 | 20 | 21 | 22 | 23 | 24 | 25 | 26 | 27 | 28 | 29 | 30 | 31 | 32 | 33 | 34 |
|---|---|---|---|---|---|---|---|---|---|---|---|---|---|---|---|---|---|---|---|---|---|---|---|---|---|---|---|---|---|---|---|---|---|---|
| Ground | A | H | H | A | H | A | H | A | H | A | H | A | H | A | H | A | H | H | A | A | H | A | H | A | H | A | H | A | H | A | H | A | H | A |
| Result | L | L | W | L | L | W | W | L | W | L | | | | | | | | | | | | | | | | | | | | | | | | |
| Position | 12 | 16 | 13 | 14 | 17 | 14 | | | | | | | | | | | | | | | | | | | | | | | | | | | | |

Updated to match(es) played on 21 November 2026. Source: DFB
A = Away; H = Home; W = Win; D = Draw; L = Loss

==== Matches ====
| 29 August 2026 1 | 1. FC Köln | 3–2 | TSG Hoffenheim | Cologne |
| 15:30 CEST (UTC+2) | El Mala 51'; Dallinga 72', 82' | Report | Daghim 27'; Moerstedt (penalty missed) 57', (yellow card) 90+4'; Kabak 67', (yellow card) 83' | Stadium: RheinEnergieStadion; Attendance: 49,700; Referee: Florian Badstübner |

| 5 September 2026 2 | TSG Hoffenheim | 2–3 | Borussia Dortmund | Sinsheim |
| 15:30 CEST (UTC+2) | Kabak (yellow card) 40'; Avdullahu 45'; Hajdari (yellow card) 45+3'; Lemperle 54'; Burger (yellow card) 63'; Kramarić (yellow card) 80' | Report | Guirassy 61'; Silva 66'; Reggiani (yellow card) 76'; Beier (yellow card) 78'; Hajdari 86' (o.g.) | Stadium: Rhein-Neckar-Arena; Attendance: 30,150; Referee: Matthias Jöllenbeck |

| 12 September 2026 3 | TSG Hoffenheim | 2–1 | VfB Stuttgart | Sinsheim |
| 15:30 CEST (UTC+2) | Hložek 13', 67'; Burger (yellow card) 63' | Report | Mittelstädt 48' | Stadium: Rhein-Neckar-Arena; Attendance: 30,150; Referee: Sven Jablonski |

| 20 September 2026 4 | SC Paderborn | 3–1 | TSG Hoffenheim | Paderborn |
| 19:30 CEST (UTC+2) | Castañeda 29'; Marino 42'; Tigges 69' | Report | Burger (yellow card) 45'; Daghim 50' | Stadium: Home Deluxe Arena; Attendance: 14,224; Referee: Daniel Schlager |

| 10 October 2026 5 | TSG Hoffenheim | 2–3 | Hamburger SV | Sinsheim |
| 15:30 CEST (UTC+2) | Bornauw 45+6' (o.g.); Conté 53'; Bernardo (yellow card) 55' (yellow-red card) 65'; Avdullahu (yellow card) 80' | Report | Poulsen 12'; Moffi 83'; Muheim 90+4' | Stadium: Rhein-Neckar-Arena; Attendance: 25,929; Referee: Harm Osmers |

| 18 October 2026 6 | Borussia Mönchengladbach | 1–2 | TSG Hoffenheim | Mönchengladbach |
| 17:30 CEST (UTC+2) | Diks (yellow card) 45'; Mohya 49'; Hack (yellow card) 89'; Machino (yellow card) 89' | Report | Conté 11'; Asllani (yellow card) 45+1'; Prass 54', (yellow card) 89' | Stadium: Borussia-Park; Attendance: 43,702; Referee: Sören Storks |

| 25 October 2026 7 | TSG Hoffenheim | 3–0 | Bayer Leverkusen | Sinsheim |
| 15:30 CET (UTC+1) | Prass (yellow card) 45' (red card) 90+1', (goal) 89'; Avdullahu (yellow card) 67'; Kramarić 79' (pen.); Daghim (yellow card) 82'; Moerstedt 90+5' | Report | Fernández (yellow card) 40'; Schick (yellow card) 58'; Medina (yellow card) 75'; Badé (yellow card) 90+3' | Stadium: Rhein-Neckar-Arena; Attendance: 27,378; Referee: Daniel Siebert |

| 31 October 2026 8 | Werder Bremen | 2–0 | TSG Hoffenheim | Bremen |
| 15:30 CET (UTC+1) | Füllkrug 57'; Friedl (yellow card) 60'; Dinkçi 82'; Arthur (yellow card) 90+2'; Regeer (yellow card) 90+2' | Report | | Stadium: Weserstadion; Attendance: 39,807; Referee: Tobias Reichel |

| 8 November 2026 9 | TSG Hoffenheim | 2–1 | Schalke 04 | Sinsheim |
| 19:30 CET (UTC+1) | Asllani 10'; Lemperle 26' | Report | Hwang Hee-chan (yellow card) 75'; Adamu 81'; Aouchiche (yellow card) 90+10' | Stadium: Rhein-Neckar-Arena; Attendance: 28,369; Referee: Martin Petersen |

| 21 November 2026 10 | Eintracht Frankfurt | 1–0 | TSG Hoffenheim | Frankfurt |
| 15:30 CET (UTC+1) | Burkardt 25', (penalty missed) 44'; Atubolu (yellow card) 90+3'; Pimpong (yellow card) 90+5' | Report | Kramarić (penalty missed) 41'; Avdullahu (yellow card) 44'; Burger (yellow card) 88'; Kabak (yellow card) 90+3' (red card) | Stadium: Deutsche Bank Park; Attendance: 59,100; Referee: Max Burda |

| 29 November 2026 11 | TSG Hoffenheim | v | FC Augsburg | Sinsheim |
| 17:30 CET (UTC+1) | | Report | | Stadium: Rhein-Neckar-Arena |

| 4–6 December 2026 12 | SC Freiburg | v | TSG Hoffenheim | Freiburg |
| --:-- CET (UTC+1) | | Report | | Stadium: Europa-Park Stadion |

| 11–13 December 2026 13 | TSG Hoffenheim | v | Bayern Munich | Sinsheim |
| --:-- CET (UTC+1) | | Report | | Stadium: Rhein-Neckar-Arena |

| 18–20 December 2026 14 | Union Berlin | v | TSG Hoffenheim | Berlin |
| --:-- CET (UTC+1) | | Report | | Stadium: Stadion An der Alten Försterei |

| 8–10 January 2027 15 | TSG Hoffenheim | v | SV Elversberg | Sinsheim |
| --:-- CET (UTC+1) | | Report | | Stadium: Rhein-Neckar-Arena |

| 12–14 January 2027 16 | Mainz 05 | v | TSG Hoffenheim | Mainz |
| --:-- CET (UTC+1) | | Report | | Stadium: Mewa Arena |

| 15–17 January 2027 17 | TSG Hoffenheim | v | RB Leipzig | Sinsheim |
| --:-- CET (UTC+1) | | Report | | Stadium: Rhein-Neckar-Arena |

| 22–24 January 2027 18 | TSG Hoffenheim | v | 1. FC Köln | Sinsheim |
| --:-- CET (UTC+1) | | Report | | Stadium: Rhein-Neckar-Arena |

| 29–31 January 2027 19 | Borussia Dortmund | v | TSG Hoffenheim | Dortmund |
| --:-- CET (UTC+1) | | Report | | Stadium: Signal Iduna Park |

| 5–7 February 2027 20 | VfB Stuttgart | v | TSG Hoffenheim | Stuttgart |
| --:-- CET (UTC+1) | | Report | | Stadium: MHPArena |

| 12–14 February 2027 21 | TSG Hoffenheim | v | SC Paderborn | Sinsheim |
| --:-- CET (UTC+1) | | Report | | Stadium: Rhein-Neckar-Arena |

| 19–21 February 2027 22 | Hamburger SV | v | TSG Hoffenheim | Hamburg |
| --:-- CET (UTC+1) | | Report | | Stadium: Volksparkstadion |

| 26–28 February 2027 23 | TSG Hoffenheim | v | Borussia Mönchengladbach | Sinsheim |
| --:-- CET (UTC+1) | | Report | | Stadium: Rhein-Neckar-Arena |

| 2–4 March 2027 24 | Bayer Leverkusen | v | TSG Hoffenheim | Leverkusen |
| --:-- CET (UTC+1) | | Report | | Stadium: BayArena |

| 5–7 March 2027 25 | TSG Hoffenheim | v | Werder Bremen | Sinsheim |
| --:-- CET (UTC+1) | | Report | | Stadium: Rhein-Neckar-Arena |

| 12–14 March 2027 26 | Schalke 04 | v | TSG Hoffenheim | Gelsenkirchen |
| --:-- CET (UTC+1) | | Report | | Stadium: Veltins-Arena |

| 19–21 March 2027 27 | TSG Hoffenheim | v | Eintracht Frankfurt | Sinsheim |
| --:-- CET (UTC+1) | | Report | | Stadium: Rhein-Neckar-Arena |

| 2–4 April 2027 28 | FC Augsburg | v | TSG Hoffenheim | Augsburg |
| --:-- CEST (UTC+2) | | Report | | Stadium: WWK Arena |

| 9–11 April 2027 29 | TSG Hoffenheim | v | SC Freiburg | Sinsheim |
| --:-- CEST (UTC+2) | | Report | | Stadium: Rhein-Neckar-Arena |

| 16–18 April 2027 30 | Bayern Munich | v | TSG Hoffenheim | Munich |
| --:-- CEST (UTC+2) | | Report | | Stadium: Allianz Arena |

| 23–25 April 2027 31 | TSG Hoffenheim | v | Union Berlin | Sinsheim |
| --:-- CEST (UTC+2) | | Report | | Stadium: Rhein-Neckar-Arena |

| 7–9 May 2027 32 | SV Elversberg | v | TSG Hoffenheim | Spiesen-Elversberg |
| --:-- CEST (UTC+2) | | Report | | Stadium: Ursapharm-Arena |

| 14–16 May 2027 33 | TSG Hoffenheim | v | Mainz 05 | Sinsheim |
| --:-- CEST (UTC+2) | | Report | | Stadium: Rhein-Neckar-Arena |

| 22 May 2027 34 | RB Leipzig | v | TSG Hoffenheim | Leipzig |
| 15:30 CEST (UTC+2) | | Report | | Stadium: Red Bull Arena |

=== DFB-Pokal ===
| 22 August 2026 First round | Erzgebirge Aue | 0–4 | TSG Hoffenheim | Aue-Bad Schlema |
| 15:30 CEST (UTC+2) | Burghardt (yellow card) 42' | Report | Wimmer 6', 45+2'; Burger 17'; Moerstedt 63' | Stadium: Eins Erzgebirgsstadion; Attendance: 8,199; Referee: Konrad Oldhafer |

| 28 October 2026 Second round | Holstein Kiel | 1–1 (4–3 p) | TSG Hoffenheim | Kiel |
| 20:45 CET (UTC+1) | Kaprálik 23', (yellow card) 106'; Nekić (yellow card) 42'; Kvilitaia (yellow card) 117' | Report | Hložek 11', (yellow card) 41'; Burger (yellow card) 45+7'; Avdullahu (yellow card) 68'; Baumann (yellow card) 76'; Machida (yellow card) 105+2' | Stadium: Holstein-Stadion; Attendance: 10,001; Referee: Bastian Dankert |
| | Penalties |
| | Kvilitaia (penalty missed); Nekić (penalty scored); Balzi (penalty scored); de Regt (penalty scored); Harres (penalty scored) | | (penalty scored) Kramarić; (penalty scored) Asllani; (penalty missed) Avdullahu; (penalty scored) Prass; (penalty missed) Rots |

=== UEFA Europa League ===
==== League phase ====
The draw for the league phase was held on 28 August 2026.

| Pos | Team | Pld | W | D | L | GF | GA | GD | Pts | Qualification |
|---|---|---|---|---|---|---|---|---|---|---|
| 21 | (England) Crystal Palace | 4 | 1 | 2 | 1 | 9 | 6 | +3 | 5 | Advance to knockout phase play-offs (unseeded) |
| 22 | (Czech Republic) Sparta Prague | 4 | 1 | 1 | 2 | 6 | 6 | 0 | 4 | Advance to knockout phase play-offs (unseeded) |
| 23 | (Germany) TSG Hoffenheim | 4 | 1 | 1 | 2 | 6 | 6 | 0 | 4 | Advance to knockout phase play-offs (unseeded) |
| 24 | (Austria) Sturm Graz | 4 | 1 | 1 | 2 | 3 | 6 | −3 | 4 | Advance to knockout phase play-offs (unseeded) |
| 25 | (Slovenia) Celje | 4 | 1 | 1 | 2 | 5 | 9 | −4 | 4 | |

Updated to match(es) played on 5 November 2026. Source: UEFA
Rules for classification: League phase tiebreakers

| Round | 1 | 2 | 3 | 4 | 5 | 6 | 7 | 8 |
|---|---|---|---|---|---|---|---|---|
| Ground | A | H | H | A | H | A | A | H |
| Result | L | L | W | D | | | | |
| Position | 29 | 30 | 23 | | | | | |

Updated to match(es) played on 5 November 2026. Source: UEFA
A = Away; H = Home; W = Win; D = Draw; L = Loss

| 17 September 2026 1 | OFI (Greece) | 2–0 | (Germany) TSG Hoffenheim | Heraklion, Greece |
| 19:45 EEST (UTC+3) | Cantalapiedra 30', (yellow card) 64'; Androutsos (yellow card) 56'; Kanellopoulos 84' | Report | Coufal (yellow card) 23'; De Cat (yellow card) 53'; Machida (yellow card) 63' | Stadium: Pankritio Stadium; Attendance: 14,909; Referee: Javier Alberola Rojas (Spain) |

| 15 October 2026 2 | TSG Hoffenheim (Germany) | 2–3 | (Turkey) Beşiktaş | Sinsheim, Germany |
| 21:00 CEST (UTC+2) | Asllani (yellow card) 23', (goal) 68'; Kabak (yellow card) 67'; Machida 88', (yellow card) 90+2'; Lemperle (yellow card) 90'; Coufal (yellow card) 90+5' | Report | Murillo 60'; Oh 72', 79', (yellow card) 80' | Stadium: Rhein-Neckar-Arena; Attendance: 26,632; Referee: Lawrence Visser (Belgium) |

| 22 October 2026 3 | TSG Hoffenheim (Germany) | 3–0 | (France) Lyon | Sinsheim, Germany |
| 21:00 CEST (UTC+2) | Rots (yellow card) 9'; Kramarić 45+4'; Daghim 49'; Burger (yellow card) 72'; Kabak (yellow card) 81'; Hložek 83' | Report | Niakhaté (yellow card) 90+3' | Stadium: Rhein-Neckar-Arena; Referee: Halil Umut Meler (Turkey) |

| 5 November 2026 4 | Crystal Palace (England) | 1–1 | (Germany) TSG Hoffenheim | London, England |
| 17:45 GMT (UTC+0) | Canvot (yellow card) 32'; Wharton (yellow card) 58' (yellow-red card) 77'; Ahanor (yellow card) 60'; Pino (yellow card) 62'; Nketiah (yellow card) 65'; Kamada 90+1' | Report | Kabak (yellow card) 6'; Prass 7'; Burger (yellow card) 25'; Kramarić (yellow card) 68' | Stadium: Selhurst Park; Referee: Horațiu Feşnic (Romania) |

| 26 November 2026 5 | TSG Hoffenheim (Germany) | v | (Austria) Sturm Graz | Sinsheim, Germany |
| 21:00 CET (UTC+1) | | Report | | Stadium: Rhein-Neckar-Arena |

| 10 December 2026 6 | Anderlecht (Belgium) | v | (Germany) TSG Hoffenheim | Brussels, Belgium |
| 18:45 CET (UTC+1) | | Report | | Stadium: Constant Vanden Stock Stadium |

| 21 January 2027 7 | Olympiacos (Greece) | v | (Germany) TSG Hoffenheim | Piraeus, Greece |
| 19:45 EET (UTC+2) | | Report | | Stadium: Karaiskakis Stadium |

| 28 January 2027 8 | TSG Hoffenheim (Germany) | v | (Hungary) Ferencváros | Sinsheim, Germany |
| 21:00 CET (UTC+1) | | Report | | Stadium: Rhein-Neckar-Arena |
