= Ralf Kettemann =

German football manager (born 1986)

Personal information
- Date of birth: 20 August 1986 (age 40)
- Place of birth: Crailsheim, Germany
- Position: Midfielder

Team information
- Current team: SC Paderborn (head coach)

Youth career
- –2005: SSV Ulm 1846

Senior career*
| Years | Team | Apps | (Gls) |
| 2003–2004 | TSV Crailsheim | 4 | (0) |
| 2005–2007 | TSV Crailsheim | 46 | (5) |
| 2007–2008 | SpVgg Greuther Fürth II | 34 | (6) |
| 2008–2009 | Stuttgarter Kickers | 14 | (0) |
| 2009–2011 | VfR Aalen | 46 | (2) |
| 2011–2019 | TSV Ilshofen | | |

Managerial career
- 2011–2019: TSV Ilshofen (player-coach)
- 2021–2025: Karlsruher SC (youth)
- 2025–: SC Paderborn
- * Club domestic league appearances and goals

Ralf Kettemann (born 20 August 1986) is a German professional football manager and former player who manages Bundesliga club SC Paderborn.

== Early life ==
Kettemann was born on 20 August 1986. Born in Crailsheim, Germany, he is a native of the city.

== Playing career ==
Kettemann started his playing career with TSV Crailsheim. Following his stint there, he signed for SpVgg Greuther Fürth II in 2007, where he made thirty-four league appearances and scored six goals.

== Managerial career ==
Kettemann started his managerial career with TSV Ilshofen in 2011, helping the club achieve promotion from the sixth tier to the fifth tier. During the summer of 2019, he was appointed as an assistant manager of TSG 1899 Hoffenheim II.

Two years later, he was appointed as a youth manager of Karlsruher SC. Ahead of the 2025–26 season, he was appointed manager of SC Paderborn, helping the club achieve promotion from the second tier to the top flight.

== Management style ==
German news website Bundesliga wrote in 2026 that he "places a great emphasis on entertaining football and controlling matches by maintaining possession of the ball, whilst also valuing hard work and developing young talent".
