= Niklas Mohr =

German footballer

Personal information
- Date of birth: July 23, 2004 (age 22)
- Place of birth: Schorndorf, Germany
- Height: 1.79 m (5 ft 10 1/2 in)
- Position: Left-back

Team information
- Current team: SC Paderborn
- Number: 24

Youth career
- VfB Stuttgart

Senior career*
Years	Team	Apps	(Gls)
2022–2025	SG Sonnenhof Großaspach	92	(8)
2025–	SC Paderborn II	19	(0)
2026–	SC Paderborn	3	(0)
- * Club domestic league appearances and goals as of 17:31, 5 September 2026 (UTC)

Niklas Mohr (born 23 July 2004) is a German professional footballer who plays as a left-back for Bundesliga club SC Paderborn.

== Club career ==
Mohr is a product of the youth academies of the German clubs TSV Haubersbronn, FSV Waiblingen, 1. FC Normannia Gmünd and VfB Stuttgart, before moving to SG Sonnenhof Großaspach in 2019 to finish his development. On 29 April 2023, he signed a professional contract with Sonnenhof Großaspach until 2026 and was promoted to their senior team in the Oberliga, and helped them earn promotion to the Regionalliga. On 1 September 2025, he transferred to SC Paderborn in the 2. Bundesliga. On 25 May 2026, he played for Paderborn as they beat VfL Wolfsburg in a 2–1 promotion playoff match where Paderborn earned promotion to the Bundesliga.

== Personal life ==
Mohr's sister, Sophia Mohr, plays handball for Frisch Auf Göppingen in the Handball-Bundesliga.

== Career statistics ==
As of match played 5 September 2026

Appearances and goals by club, season and competition
Club	Season	League			Cup		Europe		Other		Total	
Club	Season	Division	Apps	Goals	Apps	Goals	Apps	Goals	Apps	Goals	Apps	Goals
SG Sonnenhof Großaspach	2022–23	Oberliga Baden-Württemberg	33	2	—		—		4 (Note: Two appearances in promotion play-offs, two appearances in Württemberg Cup)	0	37	2
SG Sonnenhof Großaspach	2023–24	Oberliga Baden-Württemberg	32	3	—		—		5 (Note: Appearances in Württemberg Cup)	0	37	3
SG Sonnenhof Großaspach	2024–25	Oberliga Baden-Württemberg	23	2	—		—		4	0	27	2
SG Sonnenhof Großaspach	2025–26	Regionalliga Südwest	4	1	1	0	—		2	0	7	1
SG Sonnenhof Großaspach	Total		92	8	1	0	—		15	0	108	8
SC Paderborn II	2025–26	Regionalliga West	19	0	—		—		—		19	0
SC Paderborn	2025–26	2. Bundesliga	2	0	—		—		—		2	0
SC Paderborn	2026–27	Bundesliga	1	0	0	0	—		—		1	0
SC Paderborn	Total		3	0	0	0	—		—		3	0
Career total			114	8	1	0	0	0	15	0	130	8

== Honours ==
SG Sonnenhof Großaspach

- Württemberg Cup: 2024–25, 2025–26
- Oberliga Baden-Württemberg: 2024–25
- Regionalliga: 2025–26
