= Nyamekye Awortwie-Grant =

German footballer

Personal information
- Full name: Louis Nyamekye Awortwie-Grant
- Date of birth: 7 August 2000 (age 26)
- Place of birth: Tübingen, Germany
- Height: 1.93 m (6 ft 4 in)
- Position: Centre-back

Team information
- Current team: SC Paderborn
- Number: 4

Youth career
- TV Derendingen
- SSV Reutlingen 05
- TSG Balingen

Senior career*
| Years | Team | Apps | (Gls) |
| –2020 | VfB Neckarrems | 3 | (0) |
| 2020–2022 | VfL Pfullingen | 39 | (4) |
| 2022–2024 | TSG Balingen | 25 | (1) |
| 2024–2025 | Stuttgarter Kickers | 20 | (1) |
| 2025–2026 | Energie Cottbus | 33 | (0) |
| 2026– | SC Paderborn | 0 | (0) |
- * Club domestic league appearances and goals as of 13:59, 24 July 2026 (UTC)

Louis Nyamekye Awortwie-Grant (born 7 August 2000) is a German footballer who plays as a centre-back for Bundesliga club SC Paderborn.

== Early life ==
Awortwie-Grant is a product of the youth academies of the German clubs TV Derendingen, SSV Reutlingen 05 and TSG Balingen. He played for VfB Neckarrems during the 2019–20 season, transferring to VfL Pfullingen in 2020. He joined TSG Balingen in the Regionalliga Südwest in the summer of 2022, and helped them win the 2022–23 Verbandspokal. On 15 June 2024, he transferred to Stuttgarter Kickers in the Regionalliga. On 31 May 2025, he moved to Energie Cottbus in the 3. Liga and in his debut season helped them earn promotion to the 2. Bundesliga.

On 11 June 2026, Awortwie-Grant transferred to newly-promoted Bundesliga club SC Paderborn on a free transfer.

== Personal life ==
Born in Germany, Awortwie-Grant is of Ghanaian and German descent.

== Honours ==
TSG Balingen

- Württemberg Cup: 2022–23
