= Kennedy Okpala =

German footballer

Personal information
- Full name: Kennedy Onyedika Okpala
- Date of birth: 17 December 2004 (age 21)
- Place of birth: Neustadt an der Weinstraße, Germany
- Height: 1.85 m (6 ft 1 in)
- Position: Forward

Team information
- Current team: Dynamo Dresden (on loan from SC Paderborn)
- Number: 7

Youth career
- TSV Königsbach
- VfL Neustadt/Weinstraße
- 2021–2023: SV Waldhof Mannheim

Senior career*
Years	Team	Apps	(Gls)
2023–2024	SV Waldhof Mannheim U21	5	(0)
2023–2026	SV Waldhof Mannheim	71	(16)
2026–	SC Paderborn	12	(1)
2026–	→ Dynamo Dresden (loan)	0	(0)
- * Club domestic league appearances and goals as of 29 August 2026

Kennedy Onyedika Okpala (born 17 December 2004) is a German footballer who plays as a forward for 2. Bundesliga club Dynamo Dresden, on loan from SC Paderborn.

== Club career ==
Okpala is a product of the youth academies of the German clubs TSV Königsbach, VfL Neustadt/Weinstraße, and SV Waldhof Mannheim. On 29 August, he signed his first professional contract with Waldhof Mannheim and was promoted to their senior team in the 3. Liga. On 25 July 2024, he extended his contract with the club. On 2 January 2026, SC Paderborn announced that they signed Okpala on a long-term contract. His former club Waldhof Mannheim publicly disputed the transfer claiming his contract was not terminated. Both clubs came to an agreement, and he ended up joining Paderborn on 10 January 2026.

== Personal life ==
Born in Germany, Okpala is of Nigerian descent.

== Honours ==
SV Waldhof Mannheim

- Verbandspokal: 2025–26
