= Albert Millgramm =

German footballer

Personal information
- Full name: Albert Frank Millgramm
- Date of birth: 12 November 2004 (age 21)
- Place of birth: Berlin, Germany
- Position: Winger

Team information
- Current team: SC Paderborn
- Number: 19

Youth career
- FSV Blau-Weiß Mahlsdorf/Waldesruh
- 2020–2023: Hertha Zehlendorf

Senior career*
Years	Team	Apps	(Gls)
2023–2024	Hertha Zehlendorf	27	(10)
2024–2026	1. FC Magdeburg II	49	(18)
2026	1. FC Magdeburg	2	(0)
2026–	SC Paderborn	0	(0)
- * Club domestic league appearances and goals as of 14:25, 24 July 2026 (UTC)

Albert Frank Millgramm (born 12 November 2004) is a German footballer who plays as a winger for Bundesliga club SC Paderborn.

== Club career ==
Millgramm began playing football with FSV Blau-Weiß Mahlsdorf/Waldesruh, before moving to Hertha Zehlendorf to finish his development. He was promoted to Hertha Zehlendorf's senior team in the 2023–24 season, and helped them earn promotion to the Regionalliga. In 2024, he joined 1. FC Magdeburg, where he was first assigned to their reserves.

== Personal life ==
Millgramm's twin brother Luis Millgramm is also a footballer.

== Career statistics ==
As of match played 23 August 2026

Appearances and goals by club, season and competition
Club	Season	League			DFB-Pokal		Other		Total	
Club	Season	Division	Apps	Goals	Apps	Goals	Apps	Goals	Apps	Goals
Hertha Zehlendorf	2022–23	NOFV-Oberliga Nord	1	0	—		—		1	0
Hertha Zehlendorf	2023–24	NOFV-Oberliga Nord	26	10	—		4 (Note: Appearances in Berlin Cup)	2	30	12
Hertha Zehlendorf	Total		27	10	—		4	2	31	2
1. FC Magdeburg II	2024–25	NOFV-Oberliga Nord	30	13	—		—		30	13
1. FC Magdeburg II	2025–26	Regionalliga Nordost	19	5	—		—		19	5
1. FC Magdeburg II	Total		49	18	—		—		49	18
1. FC Magdeburg	2025–26	2. Bundesliga	2	0	—		—		2	0
SC Paderborn	2026–27	Bundesliga	0	0	1	0	—		1	0
Career total			78	28	1	0	4	2	83	30
