= Deniz Zeitler =

German footballer (born 2006

Personal information
- Date of birth: 13 December 2006 (age 19)
- Place of birth: Ingolstadt, Germany
- Height: 1.81 m (5 ft 11 in)
- Position: Forward

Team information
- Current team: SC Paderborn (on loan from TSG Hoffenheim)
- Number: 38

Youth career
- TV 1861 Ingolstadt
- –2024: FC Ingolstadt 04

Senior career*
Years	Team	Apps	(Gls)
2023–2025	FC Ingolstadt 04	34	(8)
2025–	TSG Hoffenheim II	38	(15)
2026–	TSG Hoffenheim	0	(0)
2026–	→ SC Paderborn (loan)	0	(0)

International career^{‡}
2025–	Germany U19	1	(0)
- * Club domestic league appearances and goals as of 30 May 2026 ‡ National team caps and goals as of 14 May 2025

Deniz Zeitler (born 13 December 2006) is a German professional footballer who plays as a forward for Bundesliga club SC Paderborn, on loan from TSG Hoffenheim.

== Early life ==
Zeitler was born on 13 December 2006. Born in Ingolstadt, Germany, he was born to a Turkish father and a German mother.

== Club career ==
=== FC Ingolstadt 04 ===
As a youth player, Zeitler joined the youth academy of TV 1861 Ingolstadt. Following his stint there, he joined the youth academy of FC Ingolstadt 04 and was promoted to the club's senior team in 2023, where he made thirty-four league appearances and scored eight goals.

=== TSG Hoffenheim ===
Ahead of the 2025–26 season, he signed for Bundesliga side TSG Hoffenheim. Austrian news website Laola1 wrote in 2025 that he was "considered a major talent in Germany" upon signing for the club.

== International career ==
Zeitler is a Germany youth international. On 14 May 2025, he debuted for the Germany national under-19 football team during a 1–1 away friendly draw with the Denmark national under-19 football team.

== Career statistics ==
As of match played 28 October 2026

Appearances and goals by club, season and competition
Club	Season	League			DFB-Pokal		Europe		Other		Total	
Club	Season	Division	Apps	Goals	Apps	Goals	Apps	Goals	Apps	Goals	Apps	Goals
FC Ingolstadt	2023–24	3. Liga	3	0	—		—		0	0	3	0
FC Ingolstadt	2024–25	3. Liga	31	8	1	0	—		3 (Note: Appearances in Bavarian Cup)	2	35	10
FC Ingolstadt	Total		34	8	1	0	—		3	2	38	10
TSG Hoffenheim II	2025–26	3. Liga	38	15	—		—		—		38	15
TSG Hoffenheim	2026–27	Bundesliga	0	0	0	0	0	0	—		0	0
SC Paderborn (loan)	2026–27	Bundesliga	0	0	2	0	—		—		2	0
Career total			72	23	3	0	0	0	3	2	78	25
