= Mladen Cvjetinović =

Association football player (born 2003)

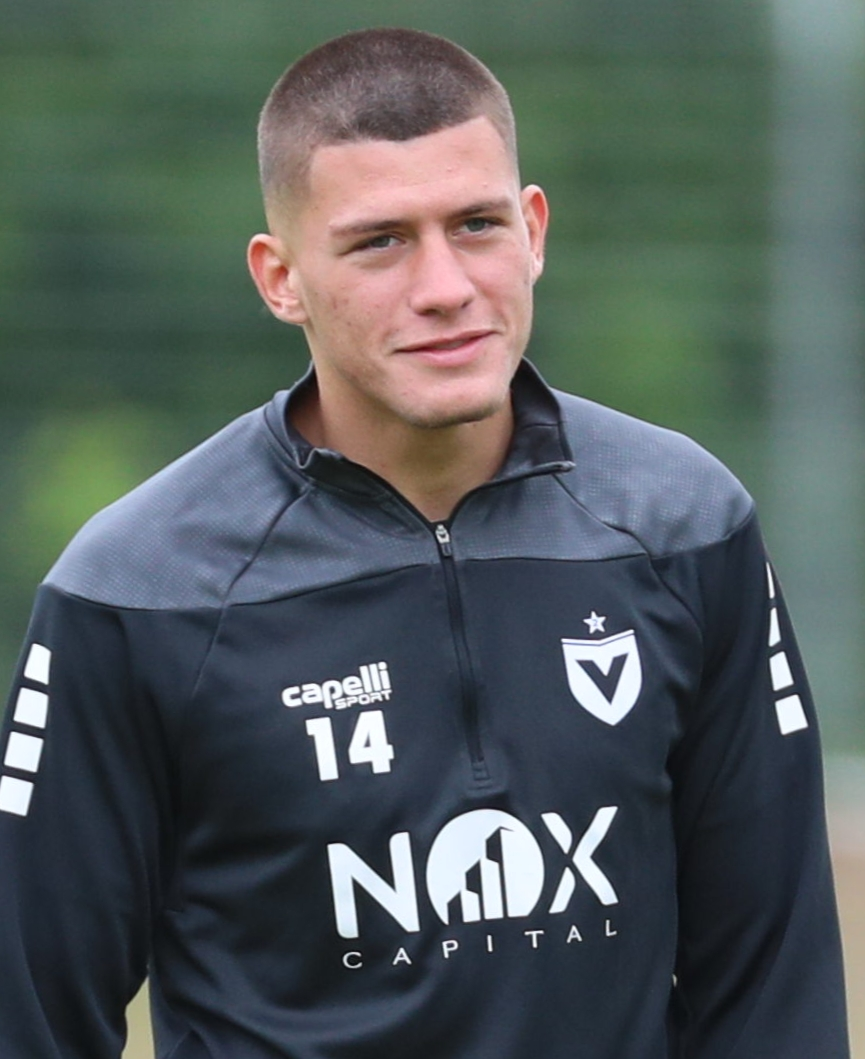
- Cvjetinović in 2022

Personal information
- Date of birth: 18 September 2003 (age 23)
- Place of birth: Berlin, Germany
- Height: 1.88 m (6 ft 2 in)
- Position: Defender

Team information
- Current team: 1. FC Saarbrücken; (on loan from Holstein Kiel)
- Number: 21

Youth career
- –2010: Grün-Weiss Neukölln
- 2010–2020: Hertha BSC
- 2020–2021: Viktoria Berlin

Senior career*
Years	Team	Apps	(Gls)
2021–2023	Viktoria Berlin	36	(0)
2023–2025	FC Ingolstadt	53	(0)
2025–	Holstein Kiel	1	(0)
2026	→ Energie Cottbus (loan)	8	(0)
2026–	→ 1. FC Saarbrücken (loan)	0	(0)

International career
2021–2022	Bosnia and Herzegovina U19	7	(0)
2022	Bosnia and Herzegovina U20	1	(0)
2022–2023	Bosnia and Herzegovina U21	6	(0)
- * Club domestic league appearances and goals as of 28 May 2026

Mladen Cvjetinović (born 18 September 2003) is a professional footballer who plays as a defender for 3. Liga club 1. FC Saarbrücken, on loan from Holstein Kiel. Born in Germany, he represented Bosnia and Herzegovina internationally up to under-21 level.

== Club career ==
Cvjetinović was born in Berlin on 18 September 2003. He played youth football with Grün-Weiss Neukölln, before joining Hertha BSC's academy in 2010. He moved to Viktoria Berlin in 2020.

Cvjetinović made his first team debut for Viktoria Berlin on 17 December 2021 as a substitute in a 4–1 3. Liga win over Viktoria Köln. He made five 3. Liga appearances over the 2021–22 season, as the club were relegated to the Regionalliga Nordost. He became club captain during the 2022–23 season, in which he made 31 Regionalliga Nordost appearances.

In summer 2023, he joined fellow 3. Liga club FC Ingolstadt. He suffered a shoulder injury in October 2023.

On 22 May 2025, it was announced that he would join 2. Bundesliga club Holstein Kiel for the 2025–26 season, on a four-year contract.

On 3 February 2026, he joined 3. Liga leaders Energie Cottbus on loan until the end of the season. On 26 June 2026, Cvjetinović moved on a new loan to 1. FC Saarbrücken in 3. Liga.

== International career ==
He has represented Bosnia and Herzegovina at under-19, under-20 and under-21 international level.

== Personal life ==
He is the cousin of fellow footballer Milos Cvjetinović, who he played alongside at Viktoria Berlin.

== Career statistics ==
As of match played 28 February 2026

Appearances and goals by club, season and competition
Club	Season	League			DFB-Pokal		Other		Total	
Club	Season	Division	Apps	Goals	Apps	Goals	Apps	Goals	Apps	Goals
Viktoria Berlin	2021–22	3. Liga	5	0	—		0	0	5	0
Viktoria Berlin	2022–23	Regionalliga Nordost	31	0	1	0	0	0	32	0
Viktoria Berlin	Total		36	0	1	0	0	0	37	0
FC Ingolstadt	2023–24	3. Liga	22	0	—		0	0	22	0
FC Ingolstadt	2024–25	3. Liga	31	0	1	0	0	0	32	0
FC Ingolstadt	Total		53	0	1	0	0	0	54	0
Holstein Kiel	2025–26	2. Bundesliga	1	0	0	0	0	0	1	0
Energie Cottbus	2025–26	3. Liga	2	0	—		0	0	2	0
Career total			92	0	2	0	0	0	94	0
