= Luka Đurić =

German footballer (born 2003)

Personal information
- Date of birth: 18 June 2003 (age 23)
- Place of birth: Sinsheim, Germany
- Height: 1.81 m (5 ft 11 in)
- Position: Midfielder

Team information
- Current team: SC Paderborn
- Number: 8

Youth career
- –2022: TSG Hoffenheim

Senior career*
Years	Team	Apps	(Gls)
2022–2026	TSG Hoffenheim II	88	(26)
2025–2026	TSG Hoffenheim	1	(0)
2026–	SC Paderborn	1	(0)
- * Club domestic league appearances and goals as of 12 September 2026

Luka Đurić (born 18 June 2003) is a professional footballer who plays as a midfielder for Bundesliga club SC Paderborn.

== Early life ==
Đurić was born on 18 March 2003. Born in Sinsheim, Germany, he is the son of Bosnia and Herzegovina footballer Nebojša Đurić. His family is from Jajce.

== Club career ==
As a youth player, Đurić joined the youth academy of TSG Hoffenheim. In 2025, he was promoted to the club's senior team.

On 28 May 2026, Đurić signed with SC Paderborn.

== International career ==
He was one of the players who were called up with the Bosnia and Herzegovina national team by head coach Sergej Barbarez for the 2026–27 UEFA Nations League B matches in September and October.

== Style of play ==
Đurić plays as a midfielder. Serbian newspaper Kurir wrote in 2026 that "he plays with his right foot, playing as a central midfielder, a classic "ten". The German media especially emphasize his technique, safe and accurate pass".

== Career statistics ==
As of match played 12 September 2026

Appearances and goals by club, season and competition
Club	Season	League			Cup		Europe		Other		Total	
Club	Season	Division	Apps	Goals	Apps	Goals	Apps	Goals	Apps	Goals	Apps	Goals
TSG Hoffenheim II	2022–23	Regionalliga Südwest	7	0	—		—		—		7	0
TSG Hoffenheim II	2023–24	Regionalliga Südwest	21	4	—		—		—		21	4
TSG Hoffenheim II	2024–25	Regionalliga Südwest	32	13	—		—		—		32	13
TSG Hoffenheim II	2025–26	Regionalliga Südwest	28	9	—		—		—		28	9
TSG Hoffenheim II	Total		88	26	—		—		—		88	26
TSG Hoffenheim	2025–26	Bundesliga	1	0	0	0	—		—		1	0
SC Paderborn	2026–27	Bundesliga	1	0	0	0	—		—		1	0
Career total			90	26	0	0	0	0	0	0	90	26
