= Cajetan Lenz =

German footballer (born 2006)

Personal information
- Full name: Cajetan Benjamin Lenz
- Date of birth: June 16, 2006 (age 20)
- Place of birth: Bochum, Germany
- Height: 1.90 m (6 ft 3 in)
- Position: Defensive midfielder

Team information
- Current team: TSG Hoffenheim
- Number: 32

Youth career
- 2011–2014: SV Höntrop
- 2014–2025: VfL Bochum

Senior career*
Years	Team	Apps	(Gls)
2025	VfL Bochum II	1	(0)
2025–2026	VfL Bochum	31	(2)
2026–	TSG Hoffenheim	1	(0)

International career^{‡}
2025	Germany U19	1	(0)
2025–2026	Germany U20	8	(0)
2026–	Germany U21	2	(0)
- * Club domestic league appearances and goals as of 20:35, 17 November 2026 (UTC) ‡ National team caps and goals as of 23:45, 31 October 2026 (UTC)

Cajetan Benjamin Lenz (born 16 June 2006) is a German professional footballer who plays as a defensive midfielder for Bundesliga club TSG Hoffenheim.

== Club career ==
Lenz began playing football at SV Höntrop before joining the VfL Bochum youth setup at the age of eight in 2014, progressing through every age group at the club's Talentwerk academy. He signed his first long-term professional contract in the summer of 2025. He established himself as a regular starter in 2. Bundesliga for VfL Bochum, making 32 competitive appearances for the first team, scoring twice and providing one assist, including scoring his first senior goal at the Vonovia Ruhrstadion. He also featured three times in the DFB-Pokal and once for VfL Bochum II in the Regionalliga West.

On 19 May 2026, VfL Bochum announced that Lenz would leave the club to join Bundesliga side TSG Hoffenheim at the end of the season.

== International career ==
Born in Germany, Lenz is of Swiss descent and holds dual German and Swiss citizenship. He is a German youth international and has represented the U19s and U20s.

He was one of the players who were called up with the Germany U21 national team by head coach Antonio Di Salvo for the friendly match against Croatia U21 on 18 November 2026.
