= Luca Erlein =

German footballer (born 2008)

Personal information
- Date of birth: 5 July 2007 (age 19)
- Place of birth: Heidelberg, Germany
- Height: 1.90 m (6 ft 3 in)
- Position: Centre-back

Team information
- Current team: Energie Cottbus (on loan from Bayer Leverkusen)
- Number: 21

Youth career
- 2017–2018: Astoria Walldorf
- 2018–2025: TSG Hoffenheim

Senior career*
Years	Team	Apps	(Gls)
2025–2026	TSG Hoffenheim II	33	(0)
2025–2026	TSG Hoffenheim	0	(0)
2026–	Bayer Leverkusen	0	(0)
2026–	→ Energie Cottbus (loan)	0	(0)

International career^{‡}
2022	Germany U15	1	(0)
2022–2023	Germany U16	5	(1)
2024–2025	Germany U18	7	(0)
2025–	Germany U19	12	(1)
Medal record
Men's football
Representing Germany
UEFA European Under-19 Championship
Runner-up	2026 Wales
- * Club domestic league appearances and goals as of 30 May 2026 ‡ National team caps and goals as of 12 July 2026

Luca Erlein (born 5 July 2007) is a German professional footballer who plays as a centre-back for 2. Bundesliga club Energie Cottbus, on loan from Bayer Leverkusen.

== Club career ==
Erlein is a youth product of Astoria Walldorf, then moved to the youth academy of TSG Hoffenheim in 2018. He made his senior and professional debut with Hoffenheim as a substitute in a 4–3 UEFA Europa League win over Anderlecht on 30 January 2025.

On 25 July 2026, Erlein signed a four-year contract with Bayer Leverkusen. Two days later, he was loaned to newly 2. Bundesliga promoted club Energie Cottbus for the 2026–27 season.

== International career ==
Erlein is a youth international for Germany, having played for the Germany U18s in 2024. He represented Germany at the 2025 UEFA European Under-19 Championship, where they were the runners-up.

== Honours ==
Germany U19

- UEFA European Under-19 Championship runner-up: 2026
