= SC Paderborn 07 =

German professional football club

SC Paderborn
- Full name: Sport-Club Paderborn 07 e.V.
- Founded: 1907; 119 years ago
- Ground: Home Deluxe Arena
- Capacity: 15,000
- President: Thomas Sagel
- Head coach: Ralf Kettemann
- League: Bundesliga
- 2025–26: 2. Bundesliga, 3rd of 18 (promoted via play-off)
- Website: scp07.de
Home colours	Away colours	Third colours

Sport-Club Paderborn 07 e.V., commonly known as simply SC Paderborn 07 (pronounced [ʔɛs t͡seː paːdɐˈbɔʁn nʊl ziːbm̩]) or SC Paderborn, is a German association football club based in Paderborn, North Rhine-Westphalia. The club currently plays in the Bundesliga in the 2026–27 season.

The club has enjoyed its greatest success since the turn of the millennium, becoming a mainstay in the 2. Bundesliga before securing promotion to the Bundesliga in the 2013–14 season. However, they got relegated to the 2. Bundesliga after only a season in the top division, and then again to the 3. Liga the season after. This relegation streak almost continued as low as the Regionalliga West, but Paderborn were saved in the 2016–17 season because 1860 Munich were refused a license, and thus got relegated instead. The club returned to 2. Bundesliga, reaching 2nd place in the 2018–19 season and was promoted to the Bundesliga. The club finished 18th in the 2019–20 season and returned to the 2. Bundesliga.

== History ==
=== Fusion into SC Paderborn ===
For most of the twentieth century, Paderborn had two football clubs: TuS Schloss Neuhaus and FC Paderborn, who remained rivals until the 1980s. After Neuhaus had been promoted to the 2. Bundesliga and finished last in 1983, this set-up had reached its athletic and financial ceiling. Thus, in 1985, the two clubs merged into TuS Paderborn/Neuhaus. In 1997, the club adopted its current identity by assuming the name SC Paderborn 07, named after TuS Neuhaus's founding date 1907.

=== Beginnings in amateur football (1985–2005) ===
During most of the 1980s, the recently merged club competed in the third-tier Oberliga Westfalen, where they counted among the leading teams but never achieved promotion. In 1994, Paderborn won the league and thereby qualified for the promotion playoffs. The team lost to Eintracht Braunschweig and Fortuna Düsseldorf, but secured a place in the newly formed third-tier of the German football pyramid, the Regionalliga West/Südwest. Except for a brief stint in the fourth tier, Paderborn enjoyed moderate success with regular trips to the DFB Pokal.

During one of these, in 2004/5, the club reached the round of 16, beating MSV Duisburg and Bundesliga side Hamburger SV on the way. It later emerged that latter match had been affected by match fixing; referee Robert Hoyzer had received a bribe to let Paderborn win the game. The incident remains the most significant betting scandal in the history of German football.

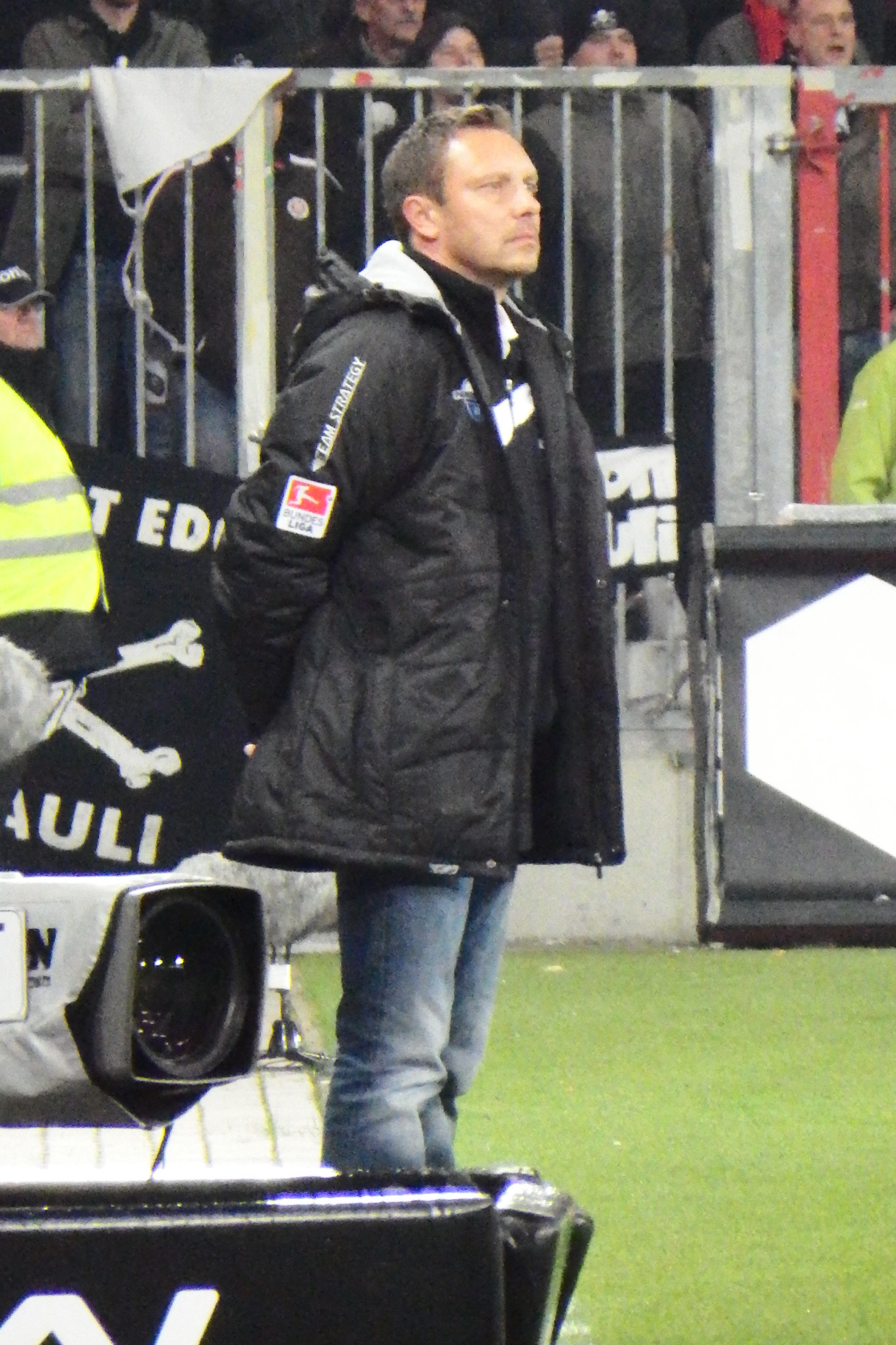
Coach André Breitenreiter in the 2013–14 promotion season

=== Consolidation in the 2. Bundesliga (2005–15) ===
Paderborn returned to the 2. Bundesliga for the first time in nearly thirty years at the end of the same season. The team's advance into professional football brought with it a professionalisation of its structures, and, in 2005, construction began on a new 15,000-seat stadium, which replaced the dated Hermann-Löns-Stadion. All of this helped to establish the club as a regular component of Germany's professional football landscape. This process culminated in the club's first promotion to the Bundesliga after the 2013/14 season under coach André Breitenreiter, who had only joined the club from TSV Havelse at the start of the season.

=== Bundesliga and years of turbulence (2015–2021) ===
Having never been in the Bundesliga before, Paderborn were described as "the biggest outsider in Bundesliga history" going into the season. The team started well; in the fourth game of the campaign against Hannover 96, midfielder Moritz Stoppelkamp scored a volley from 83 metres out, headline a Bundesliga record for the furthest ever goal. This goal also put the team top of the Bundesliga table at the time.

Paderborn were 10th in the table at the halfway point, but suffered a number of heavy losses in the second half of the season. On the second last matchday of the season, they dropped to last place, and were relegated on the final day. Upon relegation, a number of key players such as Alban Meha, Mario Vrančić, Lukas Rupp, Marvin Ducksch and captain Uwe Hünemeier left the club, while coach Breitenreiter joined Schalke.

Starting the 2015–16 season with Markus Gellhaus in charge, Paderborn surprisingly gave former Germany international Stefan Effenberg his first coaching job in October 2015. In March, Effenberg was sacked, with the team bottom of the table and heading for a second consecutive relegation, which was later confirmed. Competing in the 3. Liga for the first time since 2009, Paderborn again found themselves at the bottom of the table. After Steffen Baumgart took over as coach in April, the team picked up 11 points from his five games in charge, but could not escape the relegation zone, finishing in 18th position. That should have been a third relegation in a row, this time to the non-professional Regionalliga West, but Paderborn were unexpectedly saved by 1860 Munich not receiving a license to play in the 3. Liga. 1860 Munich were forced to move to the Regionalliga Bayern, which allowed Paderborn to stay in the third tier.

Having been saved narrowly, Baumgart's team surprisingly finished second in the 2017–18 season and returned to the 2. Bundesliga. In 2019, a remarkable turn of events, the newly promoted side completed another top-two finish, which returned Paderborn to the Bundesliga after years of turbulence. The 2019–20 season, however, ended in the same way their first Bundesliga campaign did, as Paderborn finished last, meaning relegation back to the second tier in June 2020. The following season, Paderborn finished ninth in the 2. Bundesliga, the first time since 2012–13 that the club finished outside the promotion or relegation places.

=== Back in the 2. Bundesliga, near misses, and return to the Bundesliga (2021–) ===
After a few seasons of mid-table football, Paderborn finished fourth in 2024–25 season, three points short of SV Elversberg in third and four short of Hamburger SV in second. In the 2025–26 season, Paderborn finished third, just outside the automatic promotion spots, but were promoted via the relegation play-off after defeating VfL Wolfsburg, becoming the seventh team to be promoted to the first Bundesliga.

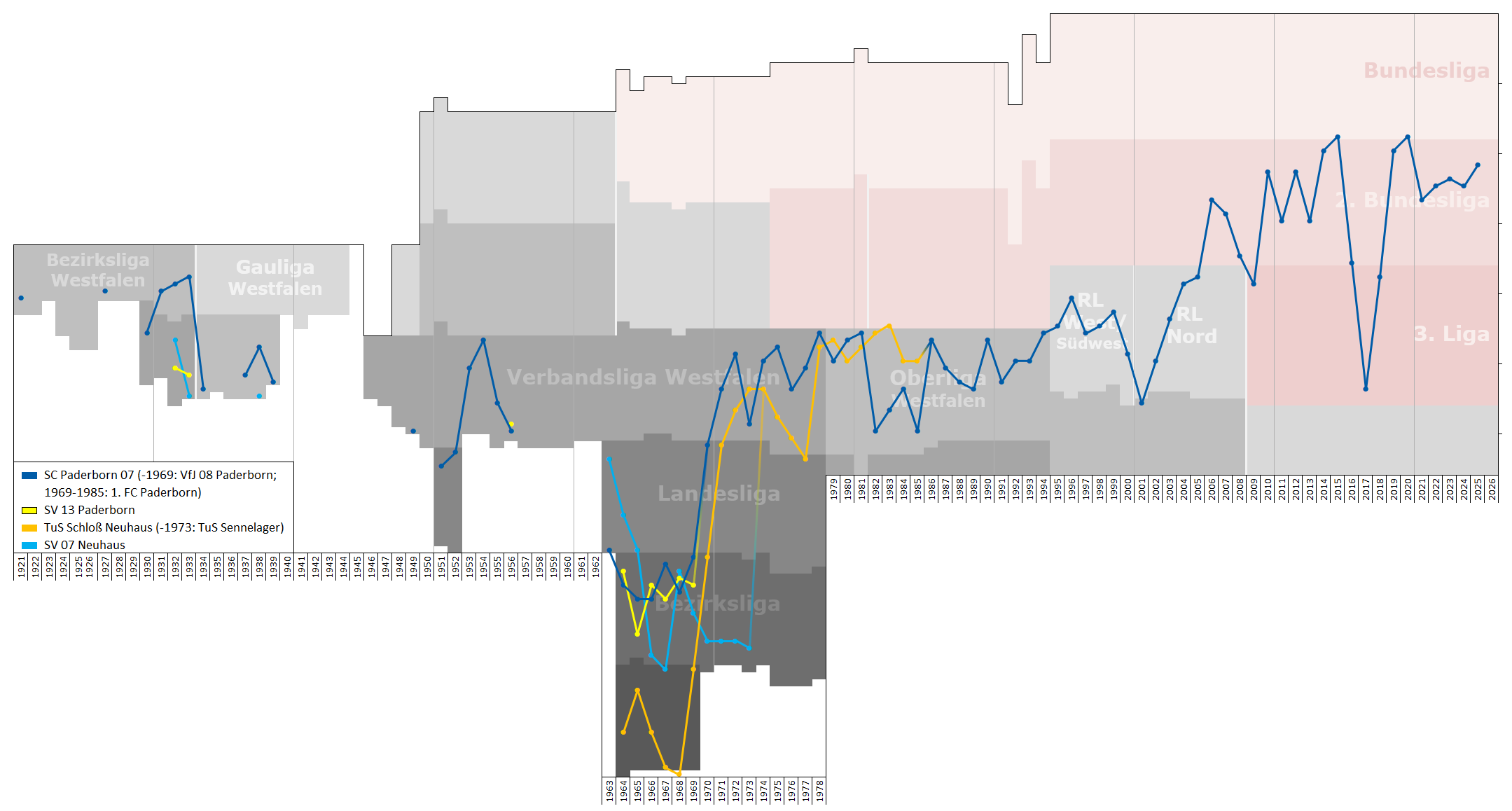
Historical chart of Paderborn league performance

== Recent seasons ==
Year	Division	Tier	Position
1985–86	Oberliga Westfalen	III	2nd
1986–87	Oberliga Westfalen	III	6th
1987–88	Oberliga Westfalen	III	8th
1988–89	Oberliga Westfalen	III	9th
1989–90	Oberliga Westfalen	III	2nd
1990–91	Oberliga Westfalen	III	8th
1991–92	Oberliga Westfalen	III	5th
1992–93	Oberliga Westfalen	III	5th
1993–94	Oberliga Westfalen	III	1st
1994–95	Regionalliga West/Südwest	III	9th
1995–96	Regionalliga West/Südwest	III	5th
1996–97	Regionalliga West/Südwest	III	10th
1997–98	Regionalliga West/Südwest	III	9th
1998–99	Regionalliga West/Südwest	III	7th
1999–00	Regionalliga West/Südwest	III	13th ↓
2000–01	Oberliga Westfalen	IV	1st ↑
2001–02	Regionalliga Nord	III	14th
2002–03	Regionalliga Nord	III	8th
2003–04	Regionalliga Nord	III	3rd
2004–05	Regionalliga Nord	III	2nd ↑
2005–06	2. Bundesliga	II	9th
2006–07	2. Bundesliga	II	11th
2007–08	2. Bundesliga	II	17th ↓
2008–09	3. Liga	III	3rd ↑
2009–10	2. Bundesliga	II	5th
2010–11	2. Bundesliga	II	12th
2011–12	2. Bundesliga	II	5th
2012–13	2. Bundesliga	II	12th
2013–14	2. Bundesliga	II	2nd ↑
2014–15	Bundesliga	I	18th ↓
2015–16	2. Bundesliga	II	18th ↓
2016–17	3. Liga	III	18th
2017–18	3. Liga	III	2nd ↑
2018–19	2. Bundesliga	II	2nd ↑
2019–20	Bundesliga	I	18th ↓
2020–21	2. Bundesliga	II	9th
2021–22	2. Bundesliga	II	7th
2022–23	2. Bundesliga	II	6th
2023–24	2. Bundesliga	II	7th
2024–25	2. Bundesliga	II	4th
2025–26	2. Bundesliga	II	3rd ↑
2026–27	Bundesliga	I	

== Players ==
=== Current squad ===
As of 2 September 2026

Note: Flags indicate national team as defined under FIFA eligibility rules; some limited exceptions apply. Players may hold more than one non-FIFA nationality.

No.	Pos.	Nation	Player
1	GK	GER	Markus Schubert
2	DF	GER	Ruben Müller
3	DF	GER	Jonah Sticker
4	DF	GER	Nyamekye Awortwie-Grant
5	MF	USA	Santiago Castañeda
6	MF	GER	Tom Baack
7	MF	GER	Oliver Batista Meier
8	MF	BIH	Luka Đurić
9	FW	FRA	Rayan Philippe (on loan from Hamburger SV)
11	FW	GER	Sven Michel
15	GK	GER	Nahuel Noll (on loan from TSG Hoffenheim)
17	DF	GER	Laurin Curda
18	FW	GER	Marvin Pieringer
19	FW	GER	Albert Millgramm
20	DF	GER	Felix Götze (captain)
21	DF	GER	Jano ter Horst

No.	Pos.	Nation	Player
22	MF	GER	Mattes Hansen
23	MF	PHI	Raphael Obermair
24	DF	GER	Niklas Mohr
25	DF	GER	Tjark Scheller
26	MF	GER	Sebastian Klaas
27	FW	GER	Steffen Tigges
28	MF	GER	Laurin Ulrich (on loan from VfB Stuttgart)
29	DF	GER	Clemens Lippmann
30	FW	GER	Stefano Marino
31	GK	GER	Florian Pruhs
32	FW	GER	Lasse Eickel
33	DF	GER	Marcel Hoffmeier
38	FW	GER	Deniz Zeitler (on loan from TSG Hoffenheim)
40	FW	CRO	Gabriel Vidović
44	MF	GER	Timur Gayret
46	DF	GER	Tristan Zobel

=== Out on loan ===
Note: Flags indicate national team as defined under FIFA eligibility rules; some limited exceptions apply. Players may hold more than one non-FIFA nationality.

No.	Pos.	Nation	Player
—	DF	GER	Kevin Krumme (at Fortuna Köln until 30 June 2027)
—	DF	GER	Martin Ens (at MSV Duisburg until 30 June 2027)
—	MF	GER	Bennit Bröger (at Fortuna Köln until 30 June 2027)

No.	Pos.	Nation	Player
—	FW	GER	Georg Ermolaev (at Alemannia Aachen until 30 June 2027)
—	FW	GER	Kennedy Okpala (at Dynamo Dresden until 30 June 2027)
—	FW	GER	Marco Wörner (at Jahn Regensburg until 30 June 2027)

=== SC Paderborn II ===
As of 8 Septembeer 2026

Note: Flags indicate national team as defined under FIFA eligibility rules; some limited exceptions apply. Players may hold more than one non-FIFA nationality.

No.	Pos.	Nation	Player
1	GK	GER	Florian Pruhs
2	DF	GER	Lenny Hennig
3	DF	GER	Jan Peters
5	DF	GER	Maximilian Hippe
6	MF	GER	Julius Bugenhagen
7	FW	GER	Shkrep Stublla
8	MF	MEX	Neo Lima Stacziwa
10	MF	GER	Bennit Bröger
13	DF	GER	David Stamm
15	MF	GER	Cihan Agirayak
17	MF	ESP	Alan Takoudjou Somolinos
19	FW	GER	Noah Ringbeck
20	MF	ESP	Pedro Restrepo Naranjo

No.	Pos.	Nation	Player
22	DF	GER	Luis Flörke
23	DF	GER	Tristan Zobel
24	DF	GER	Niklas Mohr
25	MF	GER	Jakob Kuntze
26	MF	GER	Luca Löwelt
27	DF	GER	Joel Udelhoven
28	MF	GER	Lucas Kiewitt
29	MF	GER	Paul Wollenberg
30	GK	GER	Nico Willeke
31	DF	GER	Arne Zajaczek
33	GK	GER	Ben Obertrifter
49	MF	GER	Vigo Wernet
—	GK	GER	Konstantin Sommer

=== Former players ===
- (Australia) John Iredale

== Coaches ==
- (Germany) Günther Rybarczyk (1993–2001)
- (Germany) Uwe Erkenbrecher (2001–2003)
- (Bulgaria) Pavel Dochev (2003–2005)
- (Netherlands) Jos Luhukay (2005–2006)
- (Germany) Holger Fach (2007–2008)
- (Bulgaria) Pavel Dochev (2008–2009)
- (Germany) André Schubert (2009–2011)
- (Germany) Roger Schmidt (2011–2012)
- (Germany) Stephan Schmidt (2012–2013)
- (Germany) André Breitenreiter (2013–2015)
- (Germany) Stefan Effenberg (2015–2016)
- (Germany) René Müller (2016)
- (Germany) Florian Fulland (2016) (interim)
- (Germany) Stefan Emmerling (2016–2017)
- (Germany) Steffen Baumgart (2017–2021)
- (Germany) Lukas Kwasniok (2021–2025)
- (Germany) Ralf Kettemann (2025–)

== Coaching staff ==
Position	Name
Head coach	(Germany) Ralf Kettemann
Assistant coach	(Germany) Pit Reimers (Germany) Uwe Hünemeier
Goalkeeper coach	(Germany) Nico Burchert
Video and game analyst	(Germany) Julian Metzger
Athletic coach	(United States) Ruben Solis
Rehabilitation coach	(Germany) Andreas Herbstreit
Equipment manager	(Germany) Michael Heppner
Head of medical department	(Germany) Jörg Liebeck
Physiotherapist	(Germany) Torben Glenny (Germany) Jakob Haunerland
Team doctor	(Germany) Dr. Hans-Walter Hemmen (Germany) Dr. Lutz Mahlke (Germany) Dr. Matthias Porsch (Germany) Dr. Karl-Friedrich Schünemann
Sports management	(Germany) Sebastian Lange
Head of licensed players department	(Germany) Dominik Roll
Head of development	(Germany) Marco Heussner
Head of media & communication	(Germany) Manuel Holscher
Sporting director	(Germany) Robin Trost
Team manager, licensed team	(Germany) Pascal Pundmann
Head of youth department	(Germany) Christoph Müller (Germany) Ayhan Tumani
Scouting and individual player analysis	(Germany) Henri Hyna (Germany) Robin Kohl (Germany) Janik Brosch
Chef	(Germany) Tobias Biehl
Kitchen organization	(Turkey) Goncagül Özdol
