= 2024–25 SSV Ulm 1846 season =

SSV Ulm 1846
2024–25 season
- Manager: Thomas Wörle
- Stadium: Donaustadion
- 2. Bundesliga: 17th (Relegated)
- DFB-Pokal: First Round
- Biggest win: Home: SSV Ulm 5–1 Regensburg; Away: Elversberg 1–3 SSV Ulm
- Biggest defeat: Home: SSV Ulm 0–2 SC Paderborn; Away: Hamburger SV 6–1 SSV Ulm
| Home colours | Away colours | Third colours |

The 2024–25 season was the 179th season in the history of SSV Ulm 1846 and its first in 2. Bundesliga since 2001. In addition to the domestic league, the team participated in the DFB-Pokal.

== Transfers ==
=== In ===
| Pos. | Player | Transferred from | Fee | Date | Source |
|---|---|---|---|---|---|
| MF | (Turkey) Mert Tasdelen | (Germany) Sonnenhof Großaspach | Loan return | 30 June 2024 | |
| MF | (Germany) Christoph Maier | (Germany) TSV Steinbach | Loan return | 30 June 2024 | |
| DF | (Germany) Jonathan Meier | (Germany) Dynamo Dresden | | 1 July 2024 | |
| MF | (Germany) Laurin Ulrich | (Germany) VfB Stuttgart | Loan | 1 July 2024 | |
| MF | (Germany) Maurice Krattenmacher | (Germany) Bayern Munich | Loan | 1 July 2024 | |
| FW | (Switzerland) Aaron Keller | (Germany) SpVgg Unterhaching | Loan | 1 July 2024 | |
| FW | (Bosnia and Herzegovina) Semir Telalović | (England) Blackburn Rovers | Undisclosed | 10 July 2024 | |

=== Out ===
| Pos. | Player | Transferred to | Fee | Date | Source |
|---|---|---|---|---|---|
| FW | (Greece) Thomas Kastanaras | | Loan return | 30 June 2024 | |
| DF | (Germany) Nicolas Jann | | End of contract | 1 July 2024 | |
| DF | (Germany) Thomas Geyer | | End of contract | 1 July 2024 | |
| DF | (Brazil) Léo Scienza | (Germany) 1. FC Heidenheim | | 1 July 2024 | |

== Friendlies ==
The Black and White teams will commence their season preparations on 25 June 2024. The team will be embarking on a training retreat in Oberstaufen from 1 to 7 July. During this time, SSV Ulm will also take part in a tournament in Kempten.

=== Pre-season ===
| 13 July 2024 Friendly | Basel (Switzerland) | 1–1 | (Germany) SSV Ulm | Basel, Switzerland |
| 15:00 | Frei 12' | | Higl 81' | Stadium: Stadion Schützenmatte |

| 17 July 2024 Friendly | SpVgg Unterhaching (Germany) | 1–3 | (Germany) SSV Ulm |
| 18:00 |

| 27 July 2024 Friendly | FC Ingolstadt (Germany) | 1–1 | (Germany) SSV Ulm | Ingolstadt |
| 14:00 | Borkowski 32' | | Chessa 31' | Stadium: Audi-Sportpark |

| 28 July 2024 Friendly | SSV Ulm (Germany) | 2–2 | (Germany) VfB Stuttgart II |
| 14:30 | Krattenmacher 8'; Telalović 43' | | 83'; 87' |

=== Mid-season ===
| 7 January 2025 Friendly | SSV Ulm (Germany) | 2–2 | (Germany) Erzgebirge Aue |
| 12:30 |

| 12 January 2025 Friendly | SSV Ulm (Germany) | 0–1 | (Austria) Rheindorf Altach |
| 14:00 |

| 20 March 2025 Friendly | SSV Ulm (Germany) | 2–0 | (Germany) 1860 Munich |
| 15:00 | Higl 58', 83' |

== Competitions ==
=== Overall record ===
| Competition | First match | Last match | Starting round | Record | | | | | | | |
| Competition | First match | Last match | Starting round | Pld | W | D | L | GF | GA | GD | Win % |
|---|---|---|---|---|---|---|---|---|---|---|---|
| 2. Bundesliga | 4 August 2024 | 18 May 2025 | Matchday 1 | 34 | 6 | 12 | 16 | 36 | 48 | −12 | 17.65 |
| DFB-Pokal | 16 August 2024 | 16 August 2024 | First round | 1 | 0 | 0 | 1 | 0 | 4 | −4 | 0.00 |
| Total | | | | 35 | 6 | 12 | 17 | 36 | 52 | −16 | 17.14 |

Source: Competitions

=== 2. Bundesliga ===
==== League table ====
| Pos | Team | Pld | W | D | L | GF | GA | GD | Pts | Promotion, qualification or relegation |
|---|---|---|---|---|---|---|---|---|---|---|
| 14 | Schalke 04 | 34 | 10 | 8 | 16 | 52 | 62 | −10 | 38 | |
| 15 | Preußen Münster | 34 | 8 | 12 | 14 | 40 | 43 | −3 | 36 | |
| 16 | Eintracht Braunschweig (O) | 34 | 8 | 11 | 15 | 38 | 64 | −26 | 35 | Qualification for relegation play-offs |
| 17 | SSV Ulm (R) | 34 | 6 | 12 | 16 | 36 | 48 | −12 | 30 | Relegation to 3. Liga |
| 18 | Jahn Regensburg (R) | 34 | 6 | 7 | 21 | 23 | 71 | −48 | 25 | Relegation to 3. Liga |

Source: Bundesliga
Rules for classification: 1) Points; 2) Goal difference; 3) Goals scored; 4) Head-to-head results; 5) Head-to-head away goals scored; 6) Away goals scored; 7) Play-off.
(Rules 4–6 only apply after home and away matches have been played between the tied teams.)
(O) Play-off winners; (R) Relegated

==== Results summary ====
| Overall | | | | | | | | Home | | | | | | Away | | | | | |
| Pld | W | D | L | GF | GA | GD | Pts | W | D | L | GF | GA | GD | W | D | L | GF | GA | GD |
|---|---|---|---|---|---|---|---|---|---|---|---|---|---|---|---|---|---|---|---|
| 34 | 6 | 12 | 16 | 36 | 48 | −12 | 30 | 4 | 5 | 8 | 21 | 22 | −1 | 2 | 7 | 8 | 15 | 26 | −11 |

Last updated: 29 November 2025.

==== Results by round ====
| Round | 1 | 2 | 3 | 4 | 5 | 6 | 7 | 8 | 9 | 10 | 11 | 12 | 13 | 14 | 15 | 16 | 17 | 18 | 19 | 20 | 21 | 22 | 23 | 24 | 25 | 26 | 27 | 28 | 29 | 30 | 31 | 32 | 33 | 34 |
|---|---|---|---|---|---|---|---|---|---|---|---|---|---|---|---|---|---|---|---|---|---|---|---|---|---|---|---|---|---|---|---|---|---|---|
| Ground | H | A | H | A | H | A | H | A | H | A | H | A | A | H | A | H | A | A | H | A | H | A | H | A | H | A | H | A | H | H | A | H | A | H |
| Result | L | L | L | D | L | W | W | L | L | D | D | D | D | D | L | D | D | L | W | L | L | L | D | D | L | D | W | L | W | L | W | L | L | D |
| Position | 13 | 16 | 17 | 15 | 17 | 15 | 12 | 14 | 15 | 14 | 15 | 17 | 16 | 16 | 16 | 16 | 16 | 16 | 16 | 16 | 17 | 17 | 17 | 17 | 17 | 17 | 17 | 17 | 17 | 17 | 16 | 17 | 17 | 17 |

Updated to match(es) played on 18 May 2025. Source: Bundesliga • DFB • Fussballdaten • FotMob
A = Away; H = Home; W = Win; D = Draw; L = Loss

==== Matches ====
The match schedule was released on 4 July 2024.

| 4 August 2024 Matchday 1 | SSV Ulm 1846 | 1–2 | 1. FC Kaiserslautern | Ulm |
| 13:30 CEST (UTC+2) | Chessa (yellow card) 45'; FHigl 48'; Strompf (yellow card) 88' | Report | Heuer (yellow card) 56'; Kaloč (yellow card) 63'; Tomiak 77' (pen.); Opoku 83'; Hanslik (yellow card) 90+2' | Stadium: Donaustadion; Attendance: 17,400; Referee: Robert Schröder |

| 9 August 2024 Matchday 2 | SSV Jahn Regensburg | 1–0 | SSV Ulm 1846 | Regensburg |
| 18:30 CEST (UTC+2) | Kother 34' (yellow card) 67'; Schönfelder (yellow card) 36'; Kühlwetter (yellow card) 88' | Report | Allgeier (yellow card) 15'; Rösch (yellow card) 64' | Stadium: Jahnstadion Regensburg; Attendance: 12,095; Referee: Lukas Benen |

| 25 August 2024 Matchday 3 | SSV Ulm 1846 | 1–2 | Fortuna Düsseldorf | Ulm |
| 13:30 CEST (UTC+2) | Brandt (yellow card) 20'; Higl 41' (pen.); Kolbe (yellow card) 53' | Report | Iyoha (yellow card) 40'; Sobottka (yellow card) 47'; Niemiec (yellow card) 48'; Pejčinović 81'; Schmidt 82'; Zimmermann (yellow card) 85'; Mbamba (yellow card) 90+2' | Stadium: Donaustadion; Attendance: 13,326; Referee: Eric-Dominic Weisbach |

| 1 September 2024 Matchday 4 | SC Paderborn 07 | 0–0 | SSV Ulm 1846 | Paderborn |
| 13:30 CEST (UTC+2) | Scheller (yellow card) 40'; Curda (yellow card) 66'; Castañeda (yellow card) 88' | Report | Rösch (yellow card) 51'; Maier (yellow card) 55'; Ortag (yellow card) 90+5' | Stadium: Home Deluxe Arena; Attendance: 11,985; Referee: Florian Lechner |

| 14 September 2024 Matchday 5 | SSV Ulm 1846 | 1–2 | 1. FC Nürnberg | Ulm |
| 13:00 CEST (UTC+2) | Maier (yellow card) 21'; Telalović 51'; Brandt (yellow card) 72'; Ulrich (yellow card) 88'; Johannes Reichert (yellow card) 90+6'; Ortag (yellow card) 90+9' | Report | Jander (yellow card) 45+1'; Justvan (yellow card) 54'; Okunuki (yellow card) 58'; Tzimas 64' (red card) 90+10'; Castrop (yellow card) 65'; Soares (yellow card) 67'; Duman 90+9' (pen.) (yellow card) 90+9' | Stadium: Donaustadion; Attendance: 17,400; Referee: Wolfgang Haslberger |

| 22 September 2024 Matchday 6 | SV Elversberg | 1–3 | SSV Ulm 1846 | Spiesen-Elversberg |
| 13:30 CEST (UTC+2) | Pinckert (yellow card) 10'; Sickinger (yellow card) 19'; Şahin (yellow card) 59'; Schnellbacher 62' | Report | Reichert 28' (pen.); Strompf (yellow card) 43' (goal) 77'; Higl 60'; Rösch (yellow card) 74' | Stadium: Ursapharm-Arena an der Kaiserlinde; Attendance: 8,471; Referee: Patrick Schwengers |

| 27 September 2024 Matchday 7 | SSV Ulm 1846 | 3–1 | Eintracht Braunschweig | Ulm |
| 18:30 CEST (UTC+2) | Romario Rösch 14'; Philipp Strompf (yellow card) 22'; Maurice Krattenmacher 39'; Felix Higl 84' (pen.); Lucas Röser (yellow card) 90+3' | Report | Sven Köhler (footballer, born 1996) (yellow card) 45+3' (yellow-red card) 50'; Paul Jaeckel (yellow card) 45+4'; Levente Szabó 76' (yellow card) 87'; Niklas Tauer (yellow card) 83' | Stadium: Ursapharm-Arena an der Kaiserlinde; Attendance: 13,607; Referee: Richard Hempel |

| 5 October 2024 Matchday 8 | 1. FC Köln | 2–0 | SSV Ulm 1846 | Köln |
| 13:00 CEST (UTC+2) | Hübers 8' (yellow card) 25'; Finkgräfe (yellow card) 34'; Waldschmidt 47' (yellow card) 73'; Paqarada (yellow card) 71' | Report | Brandt (red card) 21'; Wörle (yellow card) 36'; Chessa (yellow card) 84' | Stadium: RheinEnergieStadion; Attendance: 49,900; Referee: Patrick Alt |

| 20 October 2024 Matchday 9 | SSV Ulm 1846 | 0–1 | Karlsruher SC | Ulm |
| 13:30 CEST (UTC+2) | Higl (yellow card) 88'; Strompf (yellow card) 90+1'; Maier (yellow card) 90+5' | Report | Rapp (yellow card) 28'; Zivzivadze (yellow card) 83'; Franke (yellow card) 90+1' (goal) 90+4' | Stadium: Donaustadion; Attendance: 17,400; Referee: Michael Bacher |

| 27 October 2024 Matchday 10 | SV Darmstadt 98 | 1–1 | SSV Ulm 1846 | Darmstadt |
| 13:30 CET (UTC+1) | Hornby 16' (yellow card) 30'; Vukotić 60' | Report | Keller 18'; Chessa (yellow card) 62'; Rösch (yellow card) 70'; Brandt (yellow card) 80' | Stadium: Merck-Stadion am Böllenfalltor; Attendance: 17,455; Referee: Sören Storks |

| 1 November 2024 Matchday 11 | SSV Ulm 1846 | 0–0 | FC Schalke 04 | Ulm |
| 18:30 CET (UTC+1) | Stoll (yellow card) 22'; Krattenmacher (yellow card) 65' | Report | Bachmann (yellow card) 12'; Seguin (yellow card) 47'; Kamiński (yellow card) 50' | Stadium: Donaustadion; Attendance: 17,400; Referee: Felix Prigan |

| 9 November 2024 Matchday 12 | 1. FC Magdeburg | 0–0 | SSV Ulm 1846 | Magdeburg |
| 13:00 CET (UTC+1) | Hugonet (yellow card) 60'; Amaechi (yellow card) 90' | Report | Maier (yellow card) 22'; Kolbe (yellow card) 54'; Strompf (yellow card) 59' (yellow-red card) 87' | Stadium: MDCC-Arena; Attendance: 21,933; Referee: Lars Erbst |

| 23 November 2024 Matchday 13 | Hertha BSC | 2–2 | SSV Ulm 1846 | Berlin |
| 13:00 CET (UTC+1) | Winkler (yellow card) 2'; Maza 6'; Scherhant 52'; Dárdai (yellow card) 76'; Niederlechner (yellow card) 88'; Kenny (yellow card) 90+6' | Report | Maier (yellow card) 33'; Telalović 38' (yellow card) 55'; Krattenmacher 59' (yellow card) 90+7'; Brandt (yellow card) 73'; Röser (yellow card) 76' | Stadium: Olympiastadion Berlin; Attendance: 41,758; Referee: Eric-Dominic Weisbach |

| 1 December 2024 Matchday 14 | SSV Ulm 1846 | 1–1 | SpVgg Greuther Fürth | Ulm |
| 13:30 CET (UTC+1) | Thiede (yellow card) 32'; Telalović 45+1' (pen.); Allgeier (yellow card) 54'; Keller (yellow card) 59'; Hyryläinen (yellow card) 67'; Strompf (yellow card) 75' | Report | Green 16' (pen.); Gießelmann (yellow card) 45+3'; Bansé (yellow card) 45+9'; Meyerhöfer (yellow card) 64'; Müller (yellow card) 86' | Stadium: Donaustadion; Attendance: 15,400; Referee: Patrick Schwengers |

| 7 December 2024 Matchday 15 | Hannover 96 | 3–2 | SSV Ulm 1846 | Hannover |
| 13:00 CET (UTC+1) | Lee 60'; Tresoldi 71', 81'; Oudenne (yellow card) 87'; Neumann (yellow card) 90+3'; Gindorf (yellow card) 90+4' | Report | Telalović 23', 55'; Meier (yellow card) 70'; Gaal (yellow card) 90+3' | Stadium: Heinz von Heiden Arena; Attendance: 25,600; Referee: Tom Bauer |

| 14 December 2024 Matchday 16 | SSV Ulm 1846 | 1–1 | Hamburger SV | Ulm |
| 13:00 CET (UTC+1) | Chessa (yellow card) 21'; Keller 34'; Telalović (yellow card) 41'; Brandt (yellow card) 90+5' | Report | Jatta (yellow card) 9'; Elfadli (yellow card) 42' (yellow-red card) 68'; Richter (yellow card) 45+2'; Selke 49'; Königsdörffer (yellow card) 90+3'; Muheim (yellow card) 90+4' | Stadium: Donaustadion; Attendance: 17,400; Referee: Patrick Alt |

| 21 December 2024 Matchday 17 | Preußen Münster | 0–0 | SSV Ulm 1846 | Münster |
| 13:00 CET (UTC+1) | Hendrix (yellow card) 21'; Paetow (yellow card) 53'; Koulis (yellow card) 57'; Kirkeskov (yellow card) 74' | Report | Chessa (yellow card) 22' | Stadium: Preußenstadion; Attendance: 11,941; Referee: Christian Ballweg |

| 18 January 2025 Matchday 18 | 1. FC Kaiserslautern | 2–1 | SSV Ulm 1846 | Kaiserslautern |
| 13:00 CET (UTC+1) | Ritter 23'; Kaloč 37'; Robinson (yellow card) 47'; Wekesser (yellow card) 90+1' | Report | Strompf 4'; Ludwig (yellow card) 28'; Kolbe (yellow card) 36'; Krattenmacher (yellow card) 56' | Stadium: Fritz-Walter-Stadion; Attendance: 42,367; Referee: Michael Bacher |

| 26 January 2025 Matchday 19 | SSV Ulm 1846 | 5–1 | SSV Jahn Regensburg | Ulm |
| 13:30 CET (UTC+1) | Gaal (yellow card) 15'; Telalović 24', 34', 45+1', 80'; Batista Meier 55' (pen.) | Report | Kühlwetter (yellow card) 13'; Ganaus 90+2' | Stadium: Donaustadion; Attendance: 14,012; Referee: Eric-Dominic Weisbach |

| 1 February 2025 Matchday 20 | Fortuna Düsseldorf | 3–2 | SSV Ulm 1846 | Düsseldorf |
| 13:00 CET (UTC+1) | Jóhannesson 9' (yellow card) 74'; Kownacki 15', 60' (pen.); van Brederode (yellow card) 21'; Oberdorf (yellow card) 76'; Haag (yellow card) 89'; Thioune (yellow card) 90+2' | Report | Keller 13'; Rösch (yellow card) 19'; Strompf (yellow card) 27'; Meier 52'; Higl (yellow card) 90+1'; Allgeier (yellow card) 90+3' | Stadium: Merkur Spiel-Arena; Attendance: 32,047; Referee: Timo Gerach |

| 8 February 2025 Matchday 21 | SSV Ulm 1846 | 0–2 | SC Paderborn 07 | Ulm |
| 13:00 CET (UTC+1) | Dressel (red card) 50'; Stoll (yellow card) 64' | Report | Obermair (yellow card) 52'; Bilbija (yellow card) 60'; Mehlem (yellow card) 75' (goal) 81'; Scheller (yellow card) 90+2'; Grimaldi 90+7' | Stadium: Donaustadion; Attendance: 12,098; Referee: Tom Bauer |

| 16 February 2025 Matchday 22 | 1. FC Nürnberg | 2–0 | SSV Ulm 1846 | Nuremberg |
| 13:30 CET (UTC+1) | Yılmaz (yellow card) 20'; Jander 86'; Tzimas (yellow card) 90'; Antiste 90+3' | Report | Krattenmacher (yellow card) 31' (yellow-red card) 59'; Hyryläinen (yellow card) 37'; Gaal (yellow card) 90' | Stadium: Max-Morlock-Stadion; Attendance: 29,355; Referee: Richard Hempel |

| 22 February 2025 Matchday 23 | SSV Ulm 1846 | 0–0 | SV Elversberg | Ulm |
| 13:00 CET (UTC+1) | Gaal (yellow card) 45+1'; Hyryläinen (yellow card) 48'; Reichert (yellow card) 66' | Report | Fellhauer (yellow card) 35'; Rohr (yellow card) 85'; Schmahl (yellow card) 90+2' | Stadium: Donaustadion; Attendance: 11,700; Referee: Timo Gansloweit |

| 1 March 2025 Matchday 24 | Eintracht Braunschweig | 1–1 | SSV Ulm 1846 | Braunschweig |
| 13:00 CET (UTC+1) | Tempelmann (yellow card) 38'; Ivanov (yellow card) 78'; Polter 85' | Report | Keller (yellow card) 9'; Röser (yellow card) 42'; Gaal (yellow card) 48'; Hyryläinen (yellow card) 90+5' | Stadium: Eintracht-Stadion; Attendance: 19,615; Referee: Florian Heft |

| 8 March 2025 Matchday 25 | SSV Ulm 1846 | 0–1 | 1. FC Köln | Ulm |
| 13:00 CET (UTC+1) | | Report | Thielmann (yellow card) 53'; Waldschmidt 86' | Stadium: Donaustadion; Attendance: 17,400; Referee: Max Burda |

| 16 March 2025 Matchday 26 | Karlsruher SC | 0–0 | SSV Ulm 1846 | Karlsruhe |
| 13:30 CET (UTC+1) | Leon Jensen (yellow card) 10' | Report | Krattenmacher (yellow card) 6'; Brandt (yellow card) 62'; Gaal (yellow card) 90+3' | Stadium: BBBank Wildpark; Attendance: 28,824; Referee: Patrick Schwengers |

| 28 March 2025 Matchday 27 | SSV Ulm 1846 | 2–1 | SV Darmstadt 98 | Ulm |
| 18:30 CET (UTC+1) | Röser 50'; Batista Meier 57'; Keller (yellow card) 70'; Hyryläinen (yellow card) 77'; Higl (yellow card) 88'; Kahvić (yellow card) 90+2'; Thiede (yellow card) 90+4' | Report | Papela (yellow card) 63'; Riedel 68' | Stadium: Donaustadion; Attendance: 15,271; Referee: Robert Kampka |

| 6 April 2025 Matchday 28 | FC Schalke 04 | 2–1 | SSV Ulm 1846 | Gelsenkirchen |
| 13:30 CEST (UTC+2) | Seguin 59'; Gantenbein (yellow card) 74' (yellow-red card) 86'; Meïssa Ba (yellow card) 81'; Kamiński 88' | Report | Higl 40' | Stadium: Veltins-Arena; Attendance: 61,922; Referee: Lukas Benen |

| 12 April 2025 Matchday 29 | SSV Ulm 1846 | 1–0 | 1. FC Magdeburg | Ulm |
| 13:00 CEST (UTC+2) | Telalović 17'; Dressel (yellow card) 65'; Higl (yellow card) 88'; Brandt (yellow card) 90' | Report | Atik (yellow card) 77'; Krempicki (yellow card) 90+7' | Stadium: Donaustadion; Attendance: 16,181; Referee: Nicolas Winter |

| 20 April 2025 Matchday 30 | SSV Ulm 1846 | 2–3 | Hertha BSC | Ulm |
| 13:30 CEST (UTC+2) | Keller 10'; Dressel 56'; Hyryläinen (yellow card) 65'; Gaal (yellow card) 87' | Report | Zeefuik (yellow card) 21'; Reese 46', 50'; Niederlechner 84' (yellow card) 87'; Kenny (yellow card) 90+5' | Stadium: Donaustadion |

| 25 April 2025 Matchday 31 | SpVgg Greuther Fürth | 0–1 | SSV Ulm 1846 | Fürth |
| 18:30 CEST (UTC+2) | Asta (yellow card) 51'; Quarshie (yellow card) 86' | Report | Krattenmacher 62' (yellow card) 77'; Brandt (yellow card) 90+4' | Stadium: Sportpark Ronhof Thomas Sommer; Attendance: 14,425; Referee: Eric-Dominic Weisbach |

| 3 May 2025 Matchday 32 | SSV Ulm 1846 | 1–2 | Hannover 96 | Ulm |
| 13:00 CEST (UTC+2) | Telalović (yellow card) 45+1' (goal) 51'; Higl (yellow card) 52'; Batista Meier (yellow card) 78' | Report | Gaal 28' (o.g.); Knight 67' (yellow card) 75'; Tomiak (red card) 69'; Neumann (yellow card) 71' | Stadium: Donaustadion; Attendance: 17,400; Referee: Timo Gerach |

| 10 May 2025 Matchday 33 | Hamburger SV | 6–1 | SSV Ulm 1846 | Hamburg |
| 20:30 CEST (UTC+2) | Reis 10'; Muheim (yellow card) 35'; Sahiti (yellow card) 40'; Königsdörffer 42', 62'; Selke 45+4'; Strompf 49' (o.g.); Mikelbrencis (yellow card) 73'; Elfadli 86' | Report | Gaal 7' (yellow card) 61' | Stadium: Volksparkstadion; Attendance: 57,000; Referee: Max Burda |

| 18 May 2025 Matchday 34 | SSV Ulm 1846 | 2–2 | Preußen Münster | Ulm |
| 15:30 CEST (UTC+2) | Telalović 10'; Röser 85'; Dressel (yellow card) 90+3' | Report | Koulis (yellow card) 5'; Makridis (yellow card) 38'; Bouchama 54'; Kyerewaa (yellow card) 63' (goal) 75'; Hendrix (yellow card) 71'; Bazzoli (yellow card) 74' | Stadium: Donaustadion; Attendance: 17,400; Referee: Patrick Alt |

=== DFB-Pokal ===
| 16 August 2024 First round | SSV Ulm | 0–4 | Bayern Munich | Ulm |
| 20:45 | Hyryläinen (yellow card) 29'; Reichert (yellow card) 45' | Report | Müller 12', 14'; Kimmich (yellow card) 74'; Coman 79'; Kane 90+3' | Stadium: Donaustadion; Attendance: 15,000; Referee: Sven Jablonski |
