= List of German football transfers summer 2024 =

This is a list of German football transfers in the summer transfer window 2024 by club. Only transfers of the Bundesliga, and 2. Bundesliga are included.

== Bundesliga ==
Note: Flags indicate national team as has been defined under FIFA eligibility rules. Players may hold more than one non-FIFA nationality.

=== Bayer Leverkusen ===
In:

No.	Pos.	Nation	Player
11	FW	FRA	Martin Terrier (from Rennes)
23	DF	FRA	Nordi Mukiele (on loan from Paris Saint-Germain)
24	MF	ESP	Aleix García (from Girona)
44	DF	FRA	Jeanuël Belocian (from Rennes)

Out:

No.	Pos.	Nation	Player
2	DF	CRO	Josip Stanišić (loan return to Bayern Munich)
6	DF	CIV	Odilon Kossounou (on loan to Atalanta)
9	FW	ESP	Borja Iglesias (loan return to Real Betis, later on loan to Celta Vigo)
18	MF	BEL	Noah Mbamba (on loan to Fortuna Düsseldorf)
23	FW	CZE	Adam Hložek (to TSG Hoffenheim)
32	MF	COL	Gustavo Puerta (on loan to Hull City)
—	GK	AUT	Patrick Pentz (to Brøndby, previously on loan)
—	FW	IRN	Sardar Azmoun (to Shabab Al Ahli, previously on loan at Roma)
—	FW	ESP	Iker Bravo (to Udinese, previously on loan at Real Madrid B)

=== VfB Stuttgart ===
In:

No.	Pos.	Nation	Player
2	DF	BEL	Ameen Al-Dakhil (from Burnley)
3	DF	NED	Ramon Hendriks (from Feyenoord)
5	MF	GER	Yannik Keitel (from SC Freiburg)
9	FW	BIH	Ermedin Demirović (from FC Augsburg)
10	FW	MLI	El Bilal Touré (on loan from Atalanta)
11	FW	GER	Nick Woltemade (from Werder Bremen)
13	DF	GER	Frans Krätzig (on loan from Bayern Munich)
17	FW	GER	Justin Diehl (from 1. FC Köln)
18	FW	GER	Jamie Leweling (from Union Berlin, previously on loan)
20	DF	SUI	Leonidas Stergiou (from St. Gallen, previously on loan)
21	GK	GER	Stefan Drljača (from Dynamo Dresden)
24	DF	GER	Jeff Chabot (from 1. FC Köln)
26	FW	GER	Deniz Undav (from Brighton & Hove Albion, previously on loan)
29	DF	FRA	Anthony Rouault (from Toulouse, previously on loan)
32	MF	SUI	Fabian Rieder (on loan from Rennes)
33	GK	GER	Alexander Nübel (on loan extended from Bayern Munich)

Out:

No.	Pos.	Nation	Player
2	DF	GER	Waldemar Anton (to Borussia Dortmund)
9	FW	GUI	Serhou Guirassy (to Borussia Dortmund)
10	MF	KOR	Jeong Woo-yeong (on loan to 1. FC Union Berlin)
17	MF	JPN	Genki Haraguchi (released)
21	DF	JPN	Hiroki Itō (to Bayern Munich)
25	MF	GER	Lilian Egloff (released)
32	FW	GER	Roberto Massimo (to Greuther Fürth)
36	MF	GER	Laurin Ulrich (on loan to SSV Ulm)
42	GK	GER	Florian Schock (to Fortuna Düsseldorf)
—	FW	COL	Juan José Perea (on loan to Zürich, previously on loan at Hansa Rostock)
—	MF	POR	Gil Dias (to Famalicão, previously on loan at Legia Warsaw)
—	DF	CRO	Matej Maglica (to Darmstadt 98, previously on loan)
—	FW	NED	Mohamed Sankoh (on loan to Cosenza, previously on loan at Heracles Almelo)
—	FW	GER	Luca Pfeiffer (on loan to Karlsruher SC, previously on loan at SV Darmstadt 98)
—	MF	TUR	Ömer Faruk Beyaz (released, previously on loan at Hatayspor)

=== Bayern Munich ===
In:

No.	Pos.	Nation	Player
15	DF	ENG	Eric Dier (from Tottenham Hotspur, previously on loan)
16	MF	POR	João Palhinha (from Fulham)
17	MF	FRA	Michael Olise (from Crystal Palace)
21	DF	JPN	Hiroki Itō (from VfB Stuttgart)
31	FW	AUS	Nestory Irankunda (from Adelaide United)
44	DF	CRO	Josip Stanišić (loan return from Bayer Leverkusen)
—	MF	ESP	Bryan Zaragoza (from Granada, previously on loan)
—	FW	GER	Armindo Sieb (from Greuther Fürth)
—	MF	GER	Maurice Krattenmacher (from SpVgg Unterhaching)
—	FW	GER	Gibson Adu (from SpVgg Unterhaching)

Out:

No.	Pos.	Nation	Player
4	DF	NED	Matthijs de Ligt (to Manchester United)
13	FW	CMR	Eric Maxim Choupo-Moting (released)
17	MF	ESP	Bryan Zaragoza (on loan to Osasuna)
20	DF	SEN	Bouna Sarr (released)
35	GK	GER	Johannes Schenk (to Preußen Münster, previously on loan)
37	MF	USA	Malik Tillman (to PSV, previously on loan)
40	DF	MAR	Noussair Mazraoui (to Manchester United)
—	MF	GER	Paul Wanner (on loan to 1. FC Heidenheim, previously on loan at SV Elversberg)
—	DF	GER	Frans Krätzig (on loan to VfB Stuttgart, previously on loan at Austria Wien)
—	MF	GER	Maurice Krattenmacher (on loan to SSV Ulm)
—	FW	GER	Armindo Sieb (on loan to Mainz 05)
—	FW	GER	Gibson Adu (on loan to SpVgg Unterhaching)
—	GK	GER	Alexander Nübel (on loan extended to VfB Stuttgart)

=== RB Leipzig ===
In:

No.	Pos.	Nation	Player
7	MF	NOR	Antonio Nusa (from Club Brugge)
10	MF	NED	Xavi Simons (on loan extended from Paris Saint-Germain)
18	MF	BEL	Arthur Vermeeren (on loan from Atlético Madrid)
20	MF	GER	Assan Ouédraogo (from Schalke 04)
26	GK	BEL	Maarten Vandevoordt (from Genk)

Out:

No.	Pos.	Nation	Player
3	DF	GER	Christopher Lenz (released)
7	MF	ESP	Dani Olmo (to Barcelona)
21	GK	GER	Janis Blaswich (on loan to Red Bull Salzburg)
31	DF	GER	Tim Köhler (on loan to SC Verl)
46	FW	NED	Yannick Eduardo (on loan to De Graafschap)
—	FW	GER	Timo Werner (on loan extended to Tottenham Hotspur)
—	GK	GER	Tim Schreiber (to Dynamo Dresden, previously on loan at 1. FC Saarbrücken)
—	DF	ESP	Angeliño (to Roma, previously on loan)
—	DF	GER	Sanoussy Ba (to Eintracht Braunschweig, previously on loan at LASK)
—	FW	GER	Dennis Borkowski (to FC Ingolstadt, previously on loan at Dynamo Dresden)
—	DF	GER	Frederik Jäkel (on loan extended to SV Elversberg)
—	DF	GER	Tim Köhler (on loan to SC Verl)
—	FW	ESP	Hugo Novoa (to Alavés, previously on loan at Villarreal B)
—	MF	GUI	Ilaix Moriba (on loan to Celta Vigo, previously on loan at Getafe)

=== Borussia Dortmund ===
In:

No.	Pos.	Nation	Player
2	DF	BRA	Yan Couto (on loan from Manchester City)
3	DF	GER	Waldemar Anton (from VfB Stuttgart)
13	MF	GER	Pascal Groß (from Brighton)
14	FW	GER	Maximilian Beier (from TSG Hoffenheim)
19	FW	GUI	Serhou Guirassy (from VfB Stuttgart)

Out:

No.	Pos.	Nation	Player
2	DF	ESP	Mateu Morey (to Mallorca)
6	MF	TUR	Salih Özcan (on loan to VfL Wolfsburg)
9	FW	CIV	Sébastien Haller (on loan to Leganés)
10	FW	ENG	Jadon Sancho (loan return to Manchester United)
11	MF	GER	Marco Reus (to LA Galaxy)
14	FW	GER	Niclas Füllkrug (to West Ham)
15	DF	GER	Mats Hummels (released)
17	DF	GER	Marius Wolf (to FC Augsburg)
18	FW	GER	Youssoufa Moukoko (on loan to Nice)
22	DF	NED	Ian Maatsen (loan return to Chelsea, later to Aston Villa)
30	MF	GER	Ole Pohlmann (to Rio Ave)
32	MF	GUI	Abdoulaye Kamara (to Portsmouth)
47	DF	GER	Antonios Papadopoulos (to Lugano)
—	DF	GER	Tom Rothe (to Union Berlin, previously on loan at Holstein Kiel)
—	DF	FRA	Soumaila Coulibaly (on loan to Brest, previously on loan at Royal Antwerp)

=== Eintracht Frankfurt ===
In:

No.	Pos.	Nation	Player
3	DF	BEL	Arthur Theate (on loan from Rennes)
4	DF	GER	Robin Koch (from Leeds United, previously on loan)
5	DF	SUI	Aurèle Amenda (from Young Boys)
6	MF	DEN	Oscar Højlund (from Copenhagen)
11	FW	FRA	Hugo Ekitike (from Paris Saint-Germain, previously on loan)
13	DF	DEN	Rasmus Kristensen (on loan from Leeds United)
20	MF	TUR	Can Uzun (from 1. FC Nürnberg)
23	MF	HUN	Krisztián Lisztes (from Ferencváros)

Out:

No.	Pos.	Nation	Player
3	DF	ECU	Willian Pacho (to Paris Saint-Germain)
5	DF	CRO	Hrvoje Smolčić (on loan to LASK)
9	FW	AUT	Saša Kalajdžić (loan return to Wolverhampton Wanderers)
17	MF	GER	Sebastian Rode (retired)
20	DF	JPN	Makoto Hasebe (retired)
24	DF	POR	Aurélio Buta (on loan to Reims)
25	MF	NED	Donny van de Beek (loan return to Manchester United, later to Girona CF)
31	DF	GER	Philipp Max (to Panathinaikos)
37	MF	GER	Sidney Raebiger (to Eintracht Braunschweig)
41	GK	ALB	Simon Simoni (on loan to FC Ingolstadt)
46	DF	GER	Dario Gebuhr (to Hansa Rostock)
47	DF	GER	Elias Baum (on loan to SV Elversberg)
48	FW	ESP	Nacho Ferri (on loan to Kortrijk)
—	MF	USA	Paxten Aaronson (on loan to Utrecht, previously on loan at Vitesse)
—	FW	GER	Jessic Ngankam (on loan to Hannover 96, previously on loan at Mainz 05)
—	MF	CRO	Kristijan Jakić (to FC Augsburg, previously on loan)
—	MF	CYP	Antonio Foti (to Borussia Dortmund II, previously on loan Hannover 96)
—	MF	GER	Faride Alidou (on loan to Hellas Verona, previously on loan at 1. FC Köln)

=== TSG Hoffenheim ===
In:

No.	Pos.	Nation	Player
2	DF	CZE	Robin Hranáč (from Viktoria Plzeň)
15	DF	FRA	Valentin Gendrey (from Lecce)
19	DF	CZE	David Jurásek (on loan extended from Benfica)
22	MF	AUT	Alexander Prass (from Sturm Graz)
23	FW	CZE	Adam Hložek (from Bayer Leverkusen)
26	FW	BIH	Haris Tabaković (from Hertha BSC)

Out:

No.	Pos.	Nation	Player
10	FW	NED	Wout Weghorst (loan return to Burnley, later to Ajax)
14	FW	GER	Maximilian Beier (to Borussia Dortmund)
15	MF	GHA	Kasim Adams Nuhu (to Servette)
23	DF	USA	John Brooks (to Hertha BSC)
29	FW	DEN	Robert Skov (released)
31	MF	GER	Bambasé Conté (on loan to Karlsruher SC)
—	FW	KOS	Fisnik Asllani (on loan to SV Elversberg, previously on loan at Austria Wien)
—	MF	GER	Julian Justvan (to 1. FC Nürnberg, previously on loan at SV Darmstadt 98)
—	MF	GER	Muhammed Damar (on loan to SV Elversberg, previously on loan at Hannover 96)

=== 1. FC Heidenheim ===
In:

No.	Pos.	Nation	Player
8	FW	BRA	Léo Scienza (from SSV Ulm)
10	MF	GER	Paul Wanner (on loan from Bayern Munich)
14	FW	GER	Maximilian Breunig (from SC Freiburg II)
16	MF	GER	Julian Niehues (from 1. FC Kaiserslautern)
17	MF	AUT	Mathias Honsak (from Darmstadt 98)
20	MF	GER	Luca Kerber (from 1. FC Saarbrücken)
29	FW	DEN	Mikkel Kaufmann (from Union Berlin)
31	FW	GER	Sirlord Conteh (from SC Paderborn)

Out:

No.	Pos.	Nation	Player
8	FW	GER	Eren Dinkçi (loan return to Werder Bremen, later to SC Freiburg)
10	FW	GER	Tim Kleindienst (to Borussia Mönchengladbach)
16	MF	GER	Kevin Sessa (to Hertha BSC)
17	MF	GER	Florian Pick (to 1. FC Nürnberg)
20	FW	AUT	Nikola Dovedan (to Karagümrük)
24	FW	GER	Christian Kühlwetter (to Jahn Regensburg)
37	MF	GER	Jan-Niklas Beste (to Benfica)
44	FW	GER	Elidon Qenaj (released)

=== Werder Bremen ===
In:

No.	Pos.	Nation	Player
11	FW	AUT	Marco Grüll (from Rapid Wien)
25	GK	GER	Markus Kolke (from Hansa Rostock)
28	MF	FRA	Skelly Alvero (from Lyon, previously on loan)
42	FW	GER	Keke Topp (from Schalke 04)

Out:

No.	Pos.	Nation	Player
1	GK	CZE	Jiří Pavlenka (released)
9	FW	POL	Dawid Kownacki (on loan to Fortuna Düsseldorf)
29	FW	GER	Nick Woltemade (to VfB Stuttgart)
36	MF	GER	Christian Groß (retired)
38	GK	GER	Dudu (to Viktoria Köln)
—	FW	GER	Eren Dinkçi (to SC Freiburg, previously on loan at 1. FC Heidenheim)

=== SC Freiburg ===
In:

No.	Pos.	Nation	Player
6	MF	GER	Patrick Osterhage (from VfL Bochum)
18	FW	GER	Eren Dinkçi (from Werder Bremen)
24	GK	GER	Jannik Huth (from SC Paderborn)
26	FW	GER	Maximilian Philipp (from VfL Wolfsburg, previously on loan)

Out:

No.	Pos.	Nation	Player
14	MF	GER	Yannik Keitel (to VfB Stuttgart)
31	GK	GER	Benjamin Uphoff (to Hansa Rostock)
39	DF	TUR	Berkay Yılmaz (on loan to 1. FC Nürnberg)
—	MF	GER	Robert Wagner (on loan to FC St. Pauli, previously on loan at Greuther Fürth)
—	DF	GER	Keven Schlotterbeck (to FC Augsburg, previously on loan at VfL Bochum)
—	DF	BEL	Hugo Siquet (to Club Brugge, previously on loan at Cercle Brugge)

=== FC Augsburg ===
In:

No.	Pos.	Nation	Player
7	FW	GER	Yusuf Kabadayı (from Bayern Munich II)
11	DF	GER	Marius Wolf (from Borussia Dortmund)
13	DF	GRE	Dimitrios Giannoulis (from Norwich City)
15	FW	BEN	Steve Mounié (from Brest)
17	MF	CRO	Kristijan Jakić (from Eintracht Frankfurt, previously on loan)
22	GK	CRO	Nediljko Labrović (from Rijeka)
29	FW	COD	Samuel Essende (from Vizela)
31	DF	GER	Keven Schlotterbeck (from SC Freiburg)

Out:

No.	Pos.	Nation	Player
5	DF	GHA	Patric Pfeiffer (on loan to Young Boys)
7	FW	CRO	Dion Beljo (on loan to Rapid Wien)
9	FW	BIH	Ermedin Demirović (to VfB Stuttgart)
11	MF	ESP	Pep Biel (loan return to Olympiacos, later on loan to Charlotte FC)
19	DF	GER	Felix Uduokhai (on loan to Beşiktaş)
20	FW	GER	Sven Michel (to SC Paderborn)
22	DF	BRA	Iago (to Bahia)
33	GK	POL	Marcel Łubik (on loan to GKS Tychy)
40	GK	CZE	Tomáš Koubek (released)
—	DF	GER	Lasse Günther (on loan to Karlsruher SC, previously on loan at Wehen Wiesbaden)
—	DF	CRO	David Čolina (on loan to Vejle BK)
—	FW	FRA	Irvin Cardona (on loan to Espanyol, previously on loan at Saint-Étienne)
—	FW	BUL	Lukas Petkov (on loan to SV Elversberg, previously on loan at Greuther Fürth)

=== VfL Wolfsburg ===
In:

No.	Pos.	Nation	Player
1	GK	POL	Kamil Grabara (from Copenhagen)
4	DF	GRE	Konstantinos Koulierakis (from PAOK)
8	MF	TUR	Salih Özcan (on loan from Borussia Dortmund)
9	FW	ALG	Mohamed Amoura (on loan from Union SG)
22	DF	FRA	Mathys Angely (from Bordeaux)
24	MF	GER	Bence Dárdai (from Hertha BSC)
29	GK	GER	Marius Müller (from Schalke 04)

Out:

No.	Pos.	Nation	Player
1	GK	BEL	Koen Casteels (to Al-Qadsiah)
7	FW	CZE	Václav Černý (on loan to Rangers)
9	FW	SWE	Amin Sarr (loan return to Lyon, later on loan to Hellas Verona)
18	FW	GER	Dženan Pejčinović (on loan to Fortuna Düsseldorf)
25	DF	GER	Moritz Jenz (on loan to 1. FSV Mainz 05)
—	GK	GER	Philipp Schulze (on loan to SC Verl, previously on loan at Hallescher FC)
—	DF	GER	Felix Lange (to SV Meppen, previously on loan at SV Rödinghausen)
—	MF	CZE	Lukáš Ambros (to Górnik Zabrze, previously on loan at SC Freiburg II)
—	MF	CRO	Bartol Franjić (on loan to Shakhtar Donetsk, previously on loan at Darmstadt 98)
—	FW	GER	Maximilian Philipp (to SC Freiburg, previously on loan)
—	FW	GER	Luca Waldschmidt (to 1. FC Köln, previously on loan)
—	DF	FRA	Nicolas Cozza (on loan extended to Nantes)

=== Mainz 05 ===
In:

No.	Pos.	Nation	Player
3	DF	GER	Moritz Jenz (on loan from VfL Wolfsburg)
6	MF	JPN	Kaishū Sano (from Kashima Antlers)
11	FW	GER	Armindo Sieb (on loan from Bayern Munich)
14	MF	KOR	Hong Hyun-seok (from Gent)
22	DF	AUT	Nikolas Veratschnig (from Wolfsberger AC)

Out:

No.	Pos.	Nation	Player
3	DF	NED	Sepp van den Berg (loan return to Liverpool, later to Brentford)
8	MF	LUX	Leandro Barreiro Martins (to Benfica)
10	FW	GER	Marco Richter (on loan to Hamburger SV)
11	FW	GER	Jessic Ngankam (loan return to Eintracht Frankfurt)
14	MF	GER	Tom Krauß (on loan to Luton Town)
17	MF	FRA	Ludovic Ajorque (on loan to Brest)
23	FW	FRA	Josuha Guilavogui (released)
24	MF	GER	Merveille Papela (to Darmstadt 98)
43	FW	GER	Brajan Gruda (to Brighton)
—	FW	GER	Ben Bobzien (on loan to Austria Klagenfurt, previously on loan at Austria Lustenau)
—	FW	NED	Delano Burgzorg (to Middlesbrough, previously on loan at Huddersfield Town)

=== Borussia Mönchengladbach ===
In:

No.	Pos.	Nation	Player
7	MF	AUT	Kevin Stöger (from VfL Bochum)
11	FW	GER	Tim Kleindienst (from 1. FC Heidenheim)
16	MF	GER	Philipp Sander (from Holstein Kiel)
34	FW	GER	Charles Herrmann (from Borussia Dortmund youth)

Out:

No.	Pos.	Nation	Player
7	MF	GER	Patrick Herrmann (retired)
23	MF	GER	Christoph Kramer (released)
24	DF	GER	Tony Jantschke (retired)
—	GK	GER	Jonas Kersken (to Arminia Bielefeld, previously on loan)

=== Union Berlin ===
In:

No.	Pos.	Nation	Player
9	FW	CRO	Ivan Prtajin (from Wehen Wiesbaden)
11	MF	KOR	Jeong Woo-yeong (on loan from VfB Stuttgart)
14	DF	AUT	Leopold Querfeld (from Rapid Wien)
15	DF	GER	Tom Rothe (from Borussia Dortmund)
20	MF	SVK	László Bénes (from Hamburger SV)
—	MF	TUR	Livan Burcu (from SV Sandhausen)

Out:

No.	Pos.	Nation	Player
3	DF	GER	Paul Jaeckel (on loan to Eintracht Braunschweig)
9	FW	DEN	Mikkel Kaufmann (to 1. FC Heidenheim)
11	FW	CIV	Chris Bedia (on loan to Hull City)
12	GK	DEN	Jakob Busk (to Sønderjyske)
20	MF	TUN	Aïssa Laïdouni (to Al-Wakrah)
31	DF	GER	Robin Knoche (to 1. FC Nürnberg)
33	MF	CZE	Alex Král (on loan to Espanyol)
—	MF	JPN	Keita Endo (to FC Tokyo, previously on loan)
—	MF	NOR	Morten Thorsby (to Genoa, previously on loan)
—	DF	POL	Tymoteusz Puchacz (to Holstein Kiel, previously on loan at 1. FC Kaiserslautern)
—	FW	GER	Jamie Leweling (to VfB Stuttgart, previously on loan)
—	MF	TUR	Livan Burcu (on loan to 1. FC Magdeburg)
—	GK	GER	Lennart Grill (on loan to Eintracht Braunschweig, previously on loan at VfL Osnabrück)

=== VfL Bochum ===
In:

No.	Pos.	Nation	Player
1	GK	GER	Timo Horn (from RB Salzburg)
6	MF	MLI	Ibrahima Sissoko (from Strasbourg)
9	FW	NED	Myron Boadu (on loan from AS Monaco)
10	MF	NED	Dani de Wit (from AZ Alkmaar)
13	DF	CRO	Jakov Medić (on loan from Ajax)
16	MF	GER	Niklas Jahn (from 1. FC Nürnberg II)
18	FW	GER	Samuel Bamba (from Borussia Dortmund II)
20	DF	UKR	Ivan Ordets (from Dynamo Moscow, previously on loan)
21	MF	PHI	Gerrit Holtmann (loan return from SV Darmstadt 98)
22	FW	GUI	Aliou Baldé (on loan from OGC Nice)
23	MF	JPN	Kōji Miyoshi (from Birmingham City)
24	MF	GER	Mats Pannewig (loan return from SC Wiedenbrück)
27	GK	GER	Patrick Drewes (from Karlsruher SC)
28	MF	GER	Lennart Koerdt (from VfL Bochum youth)
34	GK	GER	Paul Grave (loan return from Wuppertaler SV)

Out:

No.	Pos.	Nation	Player
3	DF	BRA	Danilo Soares (to 1. FC Nürnberg)
6	MF	GER	Patrick Osterhage (to SC Freiburg)
7	MF	AUT	Kevin Stöger (to Borussia Mönchengladbach)
9	FW	POR	Gonçalo Paciência (loan return to Celta de Vigo, later released)
10	MF	GER	Philipp Förster (released)
11	FW	JPN	Takuma Asano (to RCD Mallorca)
16	GK	GER	Andreas Luthe (retired)
21	GK	GER	Michael Esser (retired)
22	FW	GHA	Christopher Antwi-Adjei (to FC Schalke 04)
23	GK	GER	Niclas Thiede (on loan to SSV Ulm)
30	DF	GER	Moritz Römling (to Kapfenberger SV)
31	DF	GER	Keven Schlotterbeck (loan return to SC Freiburg, later to FC Augsburg)
—	DF	ENG	Jordi Osei-Tutu (to Bolton Wanderers, previously on loan at PAS Giannina)

=== FC St. Pauli ===
In:

No.	Pos.	Nation	Player
1	GK	GER	Ben Voll (from Viktoria Köln)
18	FW	ENG	Scott Banks (from Crystal Palace, previously on loan)
39	MF	GER	Robert Wagner (on loan from SC Freiburg)

Out:

No.	Pos.	Nation	Player
10	MF	GER	Marcel Hartel (to St. Louis City)

=== Holstein Kiel ===
In:

No.	Pos.	Nation	Player
14	DF	GER	Max Geschwill (from SV Sandhausen)
16	FW	GER	Andu Kelati (from TSG Hoffenheim II)
19	FW	GER	Phil Harres (from FC 08 Homburg)
24	MF	NOR	Magnus Knudsen (from Rostov)

Out:

No.	Pos.	Nation	Player
2	DF	DEN	Mikkel Kirkeskov (to Preußen Münster)
16	MF	GER	Philipp Sander (to Borussia Mönchengladbach)
18	DF	GER	Tom Rothe (loan return to Borussia Dortmund, later to Union Berlin)
26	MF	GER	Lucas Wolf (to SV Sandhausen)
27	FW	GER	Joshua Mees (to Preußen Münster)
29	MF	GER	Niklas Niehoff (on loan to VfL Osnabrück)
32	MF	GER	Jonas Sterner (on loan to Dynamo Dresden)
—	FW	GER	Ba-Muaka Simakala (to VfL Osnabrück, previously on loan at 1. FC Kaiserslautern)

== 2. Bundesliga ==
Note: Flags indicate national team as has been defined under FIFA eligibility rules. Players may hold more than one non-FIFA nationality.

=== 1. FC Köln ===
In:

No.	Pos.	Nation	Player
9	FW	GER	Luca Waldschmidt (from VfL Wolfsburg, previously on loan)
18	DF	DEN	Rasmus Carstensen (from Genk, previously on loan)
—	FW	TOG	Mansour Ouro-Tagba (from 1860 Munich)
—	MF	GER	Chilohem Onuoha (from RB Leipzig youth)
—	MF	GER	Said El Mala (from Viktoria Köln youth)
—	FW	GER	Malek El Mala (from Viktoria Köln youth)

Out:

No.	Pos.	Nation	Player
24	DF	GER	Jeff Chabot (to VfB Stuttgart)
45	FW	GER	Justin Diehl (to VfB Stuttgart)
—	FW	TOG	Mansour Ouro-Tagba (on loan to Jahn Regensburg)
—	MF	GER	Chilohem Onuoha (on loan to SC Verl)
—	MF	GER	Said El Mala (on loan to Viktoria Köln)
—	FW	GER	Malek El Mala (on loan to Viktoria Köln)

=== Darmstadt 98 ===
In:

No.	Pos.	Nation	Player
2	DF	ESP	Sergio López (from Basel)
5	DF	CRO	Matej Maglica (from VfB Stuttgart, previously on loan)
8	MF	GER	Luca Marseiler (from Viktoria Köln)
19	FW	GER	Fynn Lakenmacher (from 1860 Munich)
20	DF	SRB	Aleksandar Vukotić (from Wehen Wiesbaden)
21	MF	GER	Merveille Papela (from Mainz 05)
22	GK	POL	Karol Niemczycki (from Fortuna Düsseldorf)
28	MF	GER	Paul Will (from Dynamo Dresden)
—	MF	GER	Kai Klefisch (from SC Paderborn)

Out:

No.	Pos.	Nation	Player
13	GK	GER	Morten Behrens (to Preußen Münster)
18	MF	AUT	Mathias Honsak (to 1. FC Heidenheim)
19	DF	AUT	Emir Karić (to Sturm Graz)
24	FW	GER	Luca Pfeiffer (loan return to VfB Stuttgart)
25	MF	PHI	Gerrit Holtmann (loan return to VfL Bochum)
28	DF	CRO	Bartol Franjić (loan return to VfL Wolfsburg)

=== Fortuna Düsseldorf ===
In:

No.	Pos.	Nation	Player
7	FW	GRE	Christos Tzolis (from Norwich City, previously on loan)
8	MF	ISL	Ísak Bergmann Jóhannesson (from Copenhagen, previously on loan)
21	FW	GER	Tim Rossmann (from Karlsruher SC)
22	MF	GER	Danny Schmidt (from Mainz 05 II)
26	GK	GER	Florian Schock (from VfB Stuttgart)
39	MF	BEL	Noah Mbamba (on loan from Bayer Leverkusen)

Out:

No.	Pos.	Nation	Player
1	GK	POL	Karol Niemczycki (to Darmstadt 98)
7	FW	GER	Dženan Pejčinović (on loan from VfL Wolfsburg)
22	FW	GER	Christoph Daferner (loan return to 1. FC Nürnberg)
—	DF	AUT	Benjamin Böckle (to Rapid Wien, previously on loan at Preußen Münster)

=== Hamburger SV ===
In:

No.	Pos.	Nation	Player
6	MF	POL	Łukasz Poręba (from Lens, previously on loan)
—	MF	LBY	Daniel Elfadli (from 1. FC Magdeburg)

Out:

No.	Pos.	Nation	Player
8	MF	SVK	László Bénes (to Union Berlin)
35	DF	GHA	Stephan Ambrosius (to St. Gallen)
46	MF	GER	Elijah Krahn (to 1. FC Saarbrücken)
—	GK	GER	Leo Oppermann (to Arminia Bielefeld, previously on loan)

=== Karlsruher SC ===
In:

No.	Pos.	Nation	Player
16	FW	GER	Luca Pfeiffer (on loan from VfB Stuttgart, previously on loan at SV Darmstadt 98)
20	DF	GER	David Herold (from Bayern Munich II, previously on loan)
—	MF	SUI	Noah Rupp (from Luzern)
—	DF	GER	Benedikt Bauer (from SpVgg Unterhaching)
—	GK	GER	Aki Koch (from Mainz 05 II)
—	MF	GER	Robin Heußer (from Wehen Wiesbaden)
—	DF	GER	Lasse Günther (on loan from FC Augsburg, previously on loan at Wehen Wiesbaden)
—	GK	GER	Robin Himmelmann (from 1. FC Kaiserslautern)
—	FW	SUI	Andrin Hunziker (on loan from Basel)

Out:

No.	Pos.	Nation	Player
5	DF	FIN	Daniel O'Shaughnessy (to HJK)
8	MF	GER	Jérôme Gondorf (to SG Stupferich)
13	FW	GER	Lars Stindl (retired)
18	DF	GER	Daniel Brosinski (to Fortuna Kirchfeld)
23	GK	GER	Patrick Drewes (to VfL Bochum)
31	FW	GER	Tim Rossmann (to Fortuna Düsseldorf)

=== Hannover 96 ===
In:

No.	Pos.	Nation	Player
2	DF	ENG	Josh Knight (from Peterborough United)
7	FW	GER	Jessic Ngankam (on loan from Eintracht Frankfurt, previously on loan at Mainz 05)
10	MF	GER	Jannik Rochelt (from SV Elversberg)
11	MF	KOR	Lee Hyun-ju (on loan from Bayern Munich II, previously on loan at Wehen Wiesbaden)
17	DF	POL	Bartłomiej Wdowik (on loan from Braga)
38	FW	GER	Thaddäus-Monju Momuluh (loan return from Arminia Bielefeld)

Out:

No.	Pos.	Nation	Player
4	DF	GER	Bright Arrey-Mbi (to Braga)
10	MF	GER	Sebastian Ernst (to Jahn Regensburg)
11	MF	AUT	Louis Schaub (to Rapid Wien)
17	MF	GER	Muhammed Damar (loan return to TSG Hoffenheim, later to SV Elversberg)
24	MF	CYP	Antonio Foti (loan return to Eintracht Frankfurt)
34	DF	GER	Yannik Lührs (to Borussia Dortmund II)
36	FW	GER	Cedric Teuchert (to St. Louis City)
40	MF	GER	Christopher Scott (loan return to Antwerp)
—	MF	GER	Max Besuschkow (to FC Ingolstadt, previously on loan at Austria Klagenfurt)

=== SC Paderborn ===
In:

No.	Pos.	Nation	Player
5	MF	USA	Santiago Castañeda (from MSV Duisburg)
9	MF	GER	Mika Baur (from SC Freiburg II)
19	MF	GER	Luca Herrmann (from Dynamo Dresden)
20	DF	GER	Felix Götze (from Rot-Weiss Essen)
21	DF	GER	Anton Bäuerle (from Bayer Leverkusen youth)
25	DF	GER	Tjark Scheller (from FC St. Pauli II)
30	GK	GER	Markus Schubert (from Vitesse)

Out:

No.	Pos.	Nation	Player
11	FW	GER	Sirlord Conteh (to 1. FC Heidenheim)
13	MF	GER	Robert Leipertz (to 1. FC Magdeburg)
20	DF	GER	Justus Henke (to FC Gütersloh)
21	GK	GER	Jannik Huth (to SC Freiburg)
24	DF	GER	Jannis Heuer (to 1. FC Kaiserslautern)
27	MF	GER	Kai Klefisch (to Darmstadt 98)
34	DF	GER	Dawyn-Paul Donner (to 1. FC Bocholt)

=== Greuther Fürth ===
In:

No.	Pos.	Nation	Player
5	DF	GER	Reno Münz (from Bayer Leverkusen youth)
9	FW	GER	Noel Futkeu (from Eintracht Frankfurt II)
11	MF	GER	Roberto Massimo (from VfB Stuttgart)
19	DF	GER	Matti Wagner (from 1. FC Köln II)

Out:

No.	Pos.	Nation	Player
15	DF	GER	Ben Schlicke (to SpVgg Unterhaching)
22	MF	GER	Robert Wagner (loan return to SC Freiburg)
25	GK	GER	Leon Schaffran (to Vaduz)
30	FW	GER	Armindo Sieb (to Bayern Munich)
—	GK	FIN	Lasse Schulz (to Vendsyssel, previously on loan at Viborg)

=== Hertha BSC ===
In:

No.	Pos.	Nation	Player
6	MF	GER	Diego Demme (from SSC Napoli)
8	MF	GER	Kevin Sessa (from 1. FC Heidenheim)
18	FW	GER	Luca Schuler (from 1. FC Magdeburg)
21	MF	FRA	Michaël Cuisance (from Venezia, previously on loan at VfL Osnabrück)
25	DF	USA	John Brooks (from TSG Hoffenheim)

Out:

No.	Pos.	Nation	Player
24	MF	GER	Bence Dárdai (to VfL Wolfsburg)
25	FW	BIH	Haris Tabaković (to TSG Hoffenheim)
—	MF	GER	Suat Serdar (to Hellas Verona, previously on loan)

=== Schalke 04 ===
In:

No.	Pos.	Nation	Player
1	GK	GER	Ron-Thorben Hoffmann (from Eintracht Braunschweig)
8	FW	GER	Amin Younes (free agent)
9	FW	MLI	Moussa Sylla (from Pau)
14	MF	GER	Janik Bachmann (from Hansa Rostock)
17	DF	SUI	Adrian Gantenbein (from Winterthur)
20	MF	GER	Aris Bayindir (from RB Leipzig youth)
21	DF	BEL	Martin Wasinski (from Charleroi, previously on loan at Kortrijk)
30	DF	GER	Anton Donkor (from Eintracht Braunschweig)
39	FW	GER	Peter Remmert (from VfL Osnabrück youth)

Out:

No.	Pos.	Nation	Player
9	FW	GER	Simon Terodde (retired)
32	GK	GER	Marius Müller (to VfL Wolfsburg)
42	FW	GER	Keke Topp (to Werder Bremen)
43	MF	GER	Assan Ouédraogo (to RB Leipzig)

=== SV Elversberg ===
In:

No.	Pos.	Nation	Player
2	DF	GER	Elias Baum (on loan from Eintracht Frankfurt)
17	MF	GER	Frederik Schmahl (from TSG Hoffenheim II)
18	FW	GER	Mohammad Mahmoud (from VfL Bochum youth)
27	FW	ERI	Filimon Gerezgiher (from SGV Freiberg)
30	MF	GER	Muhammed Damar (on loan from TSG Hoffenheim)

Out:

No.	Pos.	Nation	Player
4	DF	GER	Kevin Conrad (retired)
10	MF	GER	Jannik Rochelt (to Hannover 96)
17	MF	GER	Paul Wanner (loan return to Bayern Munich)
31	DF	GER	Thore Jacobsen (to 1860 Munich)

=== 1. FC Nürnberg ===
In:

No.	Pos.	Nation	Player
3	DF	BRA	Danilo Soares (from VfL Bochum)
7	MF	GER	Florian Pick (from 1. FC Heidenheim)
9	FW	GRE	Stefanos Tzimas (on loan from PAOK)
18	MF	GER	Rafael Lubach (from Borussia Dortmund youth)
19	MF	CZE	Michal Ševčík (on loan from Sparta Prague)
20	MF	GER	Caspar Jander (from MSV Duisburg)
31	GK	SVK	Michal Kukučka (from Trenčín)

Out:

No.	Pos.	Nation	Player
13	DF	GER	Erik Wekesser (to 1. FC Kaiserslautern)
42	MF	TUR	Can Uzun (to Eintracht Frankfurt)
—	FW	GER	Christoph Daferner (on loan to Dynamo Dresden, previously on loan at Fortuna Düsseldorf)
—	DF	GER	Louis Breunig (to Jahn Regensburg, previously on loan)
—	FW	GER	Jermain Nischalke (to FC 08 Homburg, previously on loan at Borussia Dortmund II)

=== 1. FC Kaiserslautern ===
In:

No.	Pos.	Nation	Player
3	DF	GER	Florian Kleinhansl (from VfL Osnabrück)
13	DF	GER	Erik Wekesser (from 1. FC Nürnberg)
24	DF	GER	Jannis Heuer (from SC Paderborn)
26	MF	CZE	Filip Kaloč (from Baník Ostrava, previously on loan)
31	DF	GER	Luca Sirch (from Lokomotive Leipzig)

Out:

No.	Pos.	Nation	Player
16	MF	GER	Julian Niehues (to 1. FC Heidenheim)
23	MF	GER	Philipp Hercher (to 1. FC Magdeburg)
32	GK	GER	Robin Himmelmann (to Karlsruher SC)
—	FW	GER	Lex-Tyger Lobinger (to Viktoria Köln, previously on loan at VfL Osnabrück)

=== 1. FC Magdeburg ===
In:

No.	Pos.	Nation	Player
9	FW	NED	Martijn Kaars (from Helmond Sport)
19	DF	ZAM	Lubambo Musonda (from Horsens, previously on loan at Silkeborg)
21	MF	GER	Falko Michel (from Borussia Dortmund II)
22	DF	TOG	Pierre Nadjombe (from 1. FC Köln II)
27	MF	GER	Philipp Hercher (from 1. FC Kaiserslautern)
31	MF	GER	Robert Leipertz (from SC Paderborn)
—	DF	DEN	Marcus Mathisen (from Wehen Wiesbaden)
—	MF	GER	Abu-Bekir El-Zein (from SV Sandhausen)

Out:

No.	Pos.	Nation	Player
5	DF	GER	Jamie Lawrence (loan return to Bayern Munich II)
6	MF	LBY	Daniel Elfadli (to Hamburger SV)
16	MF	ZIM	Jonah Fabisch (to Erzgebirge Aue)
19	DF	CMR	Leon Bell Bell (to Eintracht Braunschweig)
26	FW	GER	Luca Schuler (to Hertha BSC)
42	GK	GER	Julian Pollersbeck (to Jahn Regensburg)

=== Eintracht Braunschweig ===
In:

No.	Pos.	Nation	Player
11	FW	HUN	Levente Szabó (from Fehérvár, previously on loan at Diósgyőr)
15	MF	GER	Max Marie (from FC St. Pauli II)
19	DF	CMR	Leon Bell Bell (from 1. FC Magdeburg)
21	DF	GER	Kevin Ehlers (from Dynamo Dresden)
22	DF	GER	Fabio Di Michele Sanchez (from 1. FC Saarbrücken)
27	MF	GER	Sven Köhler (from OB)
37	MF	GER	Sidney Raebiger (from Eintracht Frankfurt)
—	DF	GER	Sanoussy Ba (from RB Leipzig, previously on loan at LASK)

Out:

No.	Pos.	Nation	Player
1	GK	GER	Ron-Thorben Hoffmann (to Schalke 04)
3	DF	SUI	Saulo Decarli (to Grasshoppers)
7	MF	GER	Maurice Multhaup (to 1. FC Saarbrücken)
11	FW	GER	Luc Ihorst (to SpVgg Unterhaching)
14	FW	NGA	Anthony Ujah (to Botev Plovdiv)
22	MF	TUN	Rami Zouaoui (on loan to Hessen Kassel)
26	DF	GER	Jan-Hendrik Marx (to Dynamo Dresden)
19	DF	GER	Anton Donkor (to Schalke 04)

=== SSV Ulm ===
In:

No.	Pos.	Nation	Player
1	GK	GER	Niclas Thiede (on loan from VfL Bochum)
16	FW	SUI	Aaron Keller (on loan from SpVgg Unterhaching)
17	DF	GER	Niklas Kölle (from MSV Duisburg)
18	DF	GER	Niklas Kolbe (from Stuttgarter Kickers)
19	DF	GER	Jonathan Meier (from Dynamo Dresden)
20	MF	GER	Laurin Ulrich (on loan from VfB Stuttgart)
30	MF	GER	Maurice Krattenmacher (on loan from Bayern Munich)
38	MF	FIN	Luka Hyryläinen (on loan from TSG Hoffenheim II)
44	FW	GER	Niklas Castelle (from Schalke 04 II)

Out:

No.	Pos.	Nation	Player
1	GK	GER	Lorenz Otto (to Rot-Weiß Erfurt)
19	FW	GER	Moritz Hannemann (to Würzburger Kickers)
22	FW	BRA	Léo Scienza (to 1. FC Heidenheim)

=== Preußen Münster ===
In:

No.	Pos.	Nation	Player
1	GK	GER	Johannes Schenk (from Bayern Munich, previously on loan)
2	DF	DEN	Mikkel Kirkeskov (from Holstein Kiel)
8	FW	GER	Joshua Mees (from Holstein Kiel)
14	FW	GER	Charalambos Makridis (from VfL Osnabrück)
16	DF	GER	Torge Paetow (from SC Verl)
25	DF	GER	Luca Bolay (from Waldhof Mannheim)
26	GK	GER	Morten Behrens (from Darmstadt 98)
—	GK	GER	Marian Kirsch (from Borussia Dortmund II)

Out:

No.	Pos.	Nation	Player
3	DF	AUT	Benjamin Böckle (loan return to Fortuna Düsseldorf)
8	MF	ROU	Darius Ghindovean (to FC U Craiova)
20	MF	GER	Dennis Grote (to VfL Bochum II)
25	FW	GER	Gerrit Wegkamp (to MSV Duisburg)
28	FW	POL	Dominik Steczyk (to SC Verl)
31	GK	GER	Roman Schabbing (to FC Gütersloh)
35	GK	GER	Maximilian Schulze Niehues (retired)
42	DF	GER	Alexander Hahn (to MSV Duisburg)

=== Jahn Regensburg ===
In:

No.	Pos.	Nation	Player
11	DF	GER	Nico Ochojski (from SC Verl)
15	MF	GER	Sebastian Ernst (from Hannover 96)
16	DF	GER	Louis Breunig (from 1. FC Nürnberg, previously on loan)
23	GK	GER	Julian Pollersbeck (from 1. FC Magdeburg)
30	FW	GER	Christian Kühlwetter (from 1. FC Heidenheim)
33	FW	GER	Kai Pröger (from Hansa Rostock)
39	FW	GER	Dejan Galjen (from VfB Stuttgart II)
40	FW	TOG	Mansour Ouro-Tagba (on loan from 1. FC Köln)

Out:

No.	Pos.	Nation	Player
11	MF	GER	Konrad Faber (to St. Gallen)
23	FW	GER	Jannik Graf (on loan to SpVgg Bayreuth)
30	FW	KOS	Valdrin Mustafa (to Kickers Offenbach)

== See also ==
- 2024–25 Bundesliga
- 2024–25 2. Bundesliga
