= Aaron Keller =

Aaron Keller may refer to:

- Aaron Keller (ice hockey) (born 1975), Japanese ice hockey player
- Aaron Keller (footballer) (born 2004), Swiss footballer
