= 2019–20 SC Freiburg season =

SC Freiburg
2019–20 season
- President: Fritz Keller
- Head coach: Christian Streich
- Stadium: Schwarzwald-Stadion
- Bundesliga: 8th
- DFB-Pokal: Second round
- Top goalscorer: League: Nils Petersen (11); All: Nils Petersen (11)
Home colours	Away colours	Third colours

The 2019–20 season was SC Freiburg's 121st season in existence and the club's fourth consecutive season in the top flight of German football. In addition to the domestic league, SC Freiburg participated in this season's edition of the DFB-Pokal. The season covered the period from 1 July 2019 to 30 June 2020.

== Players ==
=== Current squad ===
As of 29 January 2020

Note: Flags indicate national team as defined under FIFA eligibility rules; some limited exceptions apply. Players may hold more than one non-FIFA nationality.

No.	Pos.	Nation	Player
1	GK	GER	Alexander Schwolow
3	DF	AUT	Philipp Lienhart
4	DF	GER	Nico Schlotterbeck
5	DF	GER	Manuel Gulde
6	MF	ALB	Amir Abrashi
7	DF	FRA	Jonathan Schmid
8	MF	GER	Mike Frantz (captain)
9	FW	GER	Lucas Höler
11	FW	GER	Luca Waldschmidt
16	MF	FRA	Yoric Ravet
17	DF	GER	Lukas Kübler
18	FW	GER	Nils Petersen (3rd captain)
19	MF	GER	Janik Haberer
21	MF	AUS	Brandon Borrello

No.	Pos.	Nation	Player
22	MF	HUN	Roland Sallai
23	DF	GER	Dominique Heintz
24	DF	GER	Gian-Luca Itter
25	DF	GER	Robin Koch
26	GK	NED	Mark Flekken
27	MF	GER	Nicolas Höfler
28	MF	KOR	Kwon Chang-hoon
30	DF	GER	Christian Günter (vice-captain)
32	MF	ITA	Vincenzo Grifo
34	MF	GER	Lino Tempelmann
38	MF	GER	Florian Kath
39	MF	GER	Fabian Rüdlin
40	GK	GER	Niclas Thiede

=== Out on loan ===
Note: Flags indicate national team as defined under FIFA eligibility rules; some limited exceptions apply. Players may hold more than one non-FIFA nationality.

No.	Pos.	Nation	Player
—	GK	GER	Constantin Frommann (at SG Sonnenhof Großaspach until 30 June 2020)
—	DF	GER	Pascal Stenzel (at VfB Stuttgart until 30 June 2020)
—	DF	ENG	Chima Okoroji (at SSV Jahn Regensburg until 30 June 2020)
—	MF	GER	Jérôme Gondorf (at Karlsruher SC until 30 June 2020)
—	FW	KOR	Jeong Woo-yeong (at Bayern II until 30 June 2020)

No.	Pos.	Nation	Player
—	MF	TUN	Mohamed Dräger (at SC Paderborn 07 until 30 June 2020)
—	DF	GER	Keven Schlotterbeck (at Union Berlin until 30 June 2020)
—	FW	GER	Christoph Daferner (at Erzgebirge Aue until 30 June 2020)
—	MF	GER	Patrick Kammerbauer (at Eintracht Braunschweig until 30 June 2020)
—	MF	GER	Marco Terrazzino (at Dynamo Dresden until 30 June 2020)

== Transfers ==
=== Transfers in ===
Position	Player	Transferred from	Fee	Date	Source
DF	(Germany) Gian-Luca Itter	(Germany) VfL Wolfsburg	€2,500,000	27 May 2019	
DF	(France) Jonathan Schmid	(Germany) FC Augsburg	€4,000,000	31 May 2019	
FW	(South Korea) Jeong Woo-yeong	(Germany) Bayern Munich	€4,500,000	19 June 2019	
MF	(South Korea) Kwon Chang-hoon	(France) Dijon	€3,000,000	28 June 2019	
MF	(Italy) Vincenzo Grifo	(Germany) 1899 Hoffenheim	€7,000,000	2 September 2019	

==== Loans in ====
Position	Player	Loaned from	Date	Loan expires	Source

=== Transfers out ===
Position	Player	Transferred to	Fee	Date	Source
DF	(Germany) Jonas Föhrenbach	(Germany) 1. FC Heidenheim	€500,000	28 May 2019	
FW	(Germany) Florian Niederlechner	(Germany) FC Augsburg	€2,500,000	29 May 2019	
MF	(Switzerland) Vincent Sierro	(Switzerland) Young Boys	€1,500,000	19 June 2019	
FW	(Germany) Fabian Schleusener	(Germany) 1. FC Nürnberg	€450,000	10 July 2019	
FW	(Germany) Tim Kleindienst	(Germany) 1. FC Heidenheim	Undisclosed	2 September 2019	

==== Loans out ====
Position	Player	Loaned to	Date	Loan expires	Source
MF	(Tunisia) Mohamed Dräger	(Germany) SC Paderborn	1 July 2018	30 June 2020	
DF	(Germany) Pascal Stenzel	(Germany) VfB Stuttgart	1 July 2019	30 June 2020	
DF	(Germany) Keven Schlotterbeck	(Germany) Union Berlin	1 July 2019	30 June 2020	
DF	(Germany) Chima Okoroji	(Germany) Jahn Regensburg	1 July 2019	30 June 2020	
GK	(Germany) Constantin Frommann	(Germany) Sonnenhof Großaspach	1 July 2019	30 June 2020	
FW	(Germany) Christoph Daferner	(Germany) Erzgebirge Aue	2 July 2019	30 June 2020	
MF	(Germany) Patrick Kammerbauer	(Germany) Eintracht Braunschweig	2 September 2019	30 June 2020	
MF	(Germany) Marco Terrazzino	(Germany) Dynamo Dresden	3 January 2020	30 June 2020	
MF	(Germany) Jérôme Gondorf	(Germany) Karlsruher SC	15 January 2020	30 June 2020	
FW	(South Korea) Jeong Woo-yeong	(Germany) Bayern Munich II	29 January 2020	30 June 2020	

== Pre-season and friendlies ==
Win Draw Loss

6 July 2019 Friendly	SV Linx	0–2	SC Freiburg	Rheinau, Germany
17:00 CEST (UTC+2)				Stadium: Hans-Weber-Stadion

13 July 2019 Friendly	Offenburger FV	1–6	SC Freiburg	Offenburg, Germany
17:00 CEST (UTC+2)				Stadium: Karl-Heitz-Stadion

19 July 2019 Friendly	SC Freiburg	2–4	VfB Stuttgart	Schruns, Austria
15:00 CEST (UTC+2)	Terrazzino 90+11'; Jeong Woo-yeong 90+26'	Report	Didavi 25'; Gómez 55'; Castro 57'; Coulibaly 90+17'	Stadium: Sportplatz Golm; Attendance: 600

3 August 2019 Friendly	SC Freiburg	0–1	Cagliari	Freiburg, Germany
14:30 CEST (UTC+2)		Report	João Pedro 57'	Stadium: Möslestadion; Attendance: 200; Referee: Tobias Fritsch (Germany)

3 August 2019 Friendly	SC Freiburg	4–1	Cagliari	Freiburg, Germany
17:00 CEST (UTC+2)	Höler 15', 21'; Koch 25'; Schlotterbeck 58'	Report	Cerri 5'	Stadium: Möslestadion; Referee: Jonas Brombacher (Germany)

14 November 2019 Friendly	SC Freiburg	0–0	St. Gallen	Pfullendorf, Germany
17:00 CET (UTC+1)		Report		Stadium: Geberit-Arena

10 January 2020 Friendly	Borussia Mönchengladbach	2–1	SC Freiburg	Jerez, Spain
13:00 CET (UTC+1)	Pléa 50', 65'	Report	Petersen 72'	Stadium: Campo Hotel Barceló Montecastillo; Attendance: 170; Referee: Alonso Ramirez (Spain)

10 January 2020 Friendly	Borussia Mönchengladbach	2–1	SC Freiburg	Jerez, Spain
15:00 CET (UTC+1)	Embolo 69'; Bennetts 88'	Report	Kath 59'	Stadium: Campo Hotel Barceló Montecastillo; Attendance: 170; Referee: Adrián Bazán Muñoz (Spain)

== Competitions ==
Win Draw Loss

=== Overview ===
Competition	First match	Last match	Starting round	Final position	Record							
Competition	First match	Last match	Starting round	Final position	Pld	W	D	L	GF	GA	GD	Win %
Bundesliga	17 August 2019	27 June 2020	Matchday 1	8th	34	13	9	12	48	47	+1	38.24
DFB-Pokal	10 August 2019	29 October 2019	First round	Second round	2	1	0	1	2	3	−1	50.00
Total					36	14	9	13	50	50	+0	38.89

Last updated: 27 June 2020
Source: Soccerway

=== Bundesliga ===
==== League table ====
Pos	Team	Pld	W	D	L	GF	GA	GD	Pts	Qualification or relegation
6	1899 Hoffenheim	34	15	7	12	53	53	0	52	Qualification for the Europa League group stage (Note: Since the winners of the 2019–20 DFB-Pokal, Bayern Munich, qualified for the Champions League based on league position, the Europa League group stage spot was passed to the sixth-placed team, and the Europa League second qualifying round spot was passed to the seventh-placed team.)
7	VfL Wolfsburg	34	13	10	11	48	46	+2	49	Qualification for the Europa League second qualifying round
8	SC Freiburg	34	13	9	12	48	47	+1	48	
9	Eintracht Frankfurt	34	13	6	15	59	60	−1	45	
10	Hertha BSC	34	11	8	15	48	59	−11	41	

Source: DFB
Rules for classification: 1) Points; 2) Goal difference; 3) Goals scored; 4) Head-to-head results; 5) Head-to-head away goals scored; 6) Away goals scored; 7) Play-off.

==== Results summary ====
Overall								Home						Away					
Pld	W	D	L	GF	GA	GD	Pts	W	D	L	GF	GA	GD	W	D	L	GF	GA	GD
34	13	9	12	48	47	+1	48	9	2	6	23	17	+6	4	7	6	25	30	−5

Last updated: 27 June 2020.
Source: Bundesliga

==== Results by round ====
Round	1	2	3	4	5	6	7	8	9	10	11	12	13	14	15	16	17	18	19	20	21	22	23	24	25	26	27	28	29	30	31	32	33	34
Ground	H	A	H	A	H	A	H	A	H	A	H	A	A	H	A	H	A	A	H	A	H	A	H	A	H	A	H	A	H	H	A	H	A	H
Result	W	W	L	W	D	W	D	L	W	D	W	D	L	W	L	L	D	W	L	L	W	D	L	L	W	D	L	D	L	W	D	W	L	W
Position	3	2	6	3	5	3	4	6	3	5	4	4	6	5	6	6	8	7	8	8	8	7	9	9	8	7	7	8	8	8	8	8	8	8

Updated to match(es) played on 27 June 2020. Source: Bundesliga
A = Away; H = Home; W = Win; D = Draw; L = Loss

==== Matches ====
The Bundesliga schedule was announced on 28 June 2019.

17 August 2019 1	SC Freiburg	3–0	Mainz 05	Freiburg
15:30 CEST (UTC+2)	Lienhart (yellow card) 62'; Höler 81'; Schmid 83'; Waldschmidt 87' (pen.)	Report	St. Juste (yellow card) 11'; Latza (yellow card) 29'; Fernandes (yellow card) 34'	Stadium: Schwarzwald-Stadion; Attendance: 24,000; Referee: Robert Hartmann

24 August 2019 2	SC Paderborn	1–3	SC Freiburg	Paderborn
15:30 CEST (UTC+2)	Mamba 3'; Hünemeier (yellow card) 42'; Vasiliadis (yellow card) 63'; Gjasula (yellow card) 67'	Report	Waldschmidt 21' (pen.); Petersen 40'; Gondorf (yellow card) 45'; Kwon Chang-hoon 90'	Stadium: Benteler-Arena; Attendance: 14,322; Referee: Tobias Welz

31 August 2019 3	SC Freiburg	1–2	1. FC Köln	Freiburg
15:30 CEST (UTC+2)	Czichos 40' (o.g.)	Report	Hector (yellow card) 43'; Modeste 52'; Meré (yellow card) 54'; Skhiri 90+2'	Stadium: Schwarzwald-Stadion; Attendance: 24,000; Referee: Robert Kampka

15 September 2019 4	1899 Hoffenheim	0–3	SC Freiburg	Hoffenheim
15:30 CEST (UTC+2)		Report	Höfler (yellow card) 8'; Günter 11'; Haberer 38'; Koch (yellow card) 47'; Petersen 59'	Stadium: PreZero Arena; Attendance: 29,395; Referee: Guido Winkmann

21 September 2019 5	SC Freiburg	1–1	FC Augsburg	Freiburg
15:30 CEST (UTC+2)	Frantz (yellow card) 12'; Höler 23'	Report	Niederlechner 39'; Finnbogason (yellow card) 90'	Stadium: Schwarzwald-Stadion; Attendance: 23,800; Referee: Bastian Dankert

29 September 2019 6	Fortuna Düsseldorf	1–2	SC Freiburg	Düsseldorf
15:30 CEST (UTC+2)	Gießelmann (yellow card) 30'; Hennings 42'; Kownacki (yellow card) 60'	Report	Höfler (yellow card) 32'; Schmid 45'; Petersen (yellow card) 59'; Waldschmidt 81'	Stadium: Merkur Spiel-Arena; Attendance: 39,244; Referee: Daniel Siebert

5 October 2019 7	SC Freiburg	2–2	Borussia Dortmund	Freiburg
15:30 CEST (UTC+2)	Waldschmidt 55'; Akanji 89' (o.g.)	Report	Witsel 20'; Hummels (yellow card) 44'; Delaney (yellow card) 50'; Hakimi 67', (yellow card) 75'	Stadium: Schwarzwald-Stadion; Attendance: 24,000; Referee: Sven Jablonski

19 October 2019 8	Union Berlin	2–0	SC Freiburg	Berlin
15:30 CEST (UTC+2)	Bülter 1'; Gentner (yellow card) 11'; Andrich (yellow card) 66'; Ingvartsen (yellow card) 76', (goal) 84'	Report		Stadium: Stadion An der Alten Försterei; Attendance: 22,012; Referee: Benjamin Cortus

26 October 2019 9	SC Freiburg	2–1	RB Leipzig	Freiburg
15:30 CEST (UTC+2)	Höfler 45+2', (yellow card) 62'; Haberer (yellow card) 66'; Petersen 90'; Grifo (yellow card) 90+2'	Report	Upamecano (yellow card) 51'; Klostermann 90+3'	Stadium: Schwarzwald-Stadion; Attendance: 24,000; Referee: Harm Osmers

2 November 2019 10	Werder Bremen	2–2	SC Freiburg	Bremen
15:30 CET (UTC+1)	Rashica 9'; Bittencourt (yellow card) 57'; Gebre Selassie 59'; Şahin (yellow card) 64'; Veljković (yellow card) 83'	Report	Petersen 28', 90+3'; Günter (yellow card) 62'; Frantz (yellow card) 75'; Haberer (yellow card) 79' (yellow-red card) 87'	Stadium: Weser-Stadion; Attendance: 41,000; Referee: Christian Dingert

10 November 2019 11	SC Freiburg	1–0	Eintracht Frankfurt	Freiburg
18:00 CET (UTC+1)	Höler (yellow card) 74'; Petersen 77'; Bruns (yellow card) 90+7'; Grifo (red card) 90+9'	Report	Fernandes (yellow card) 26' (yellow-red card) 45'; Abraham (red card) 90+6'	Stadium: Schwarzwald-Stadion; Attendance: 24,000; Referee: Felix Brych

23 November 2019 12	Bayer Leverkusen	1–1	SC Freiburg	Leverkusen
15:30 CET (UTC+1)	Diaby 36'	Report	Höler 5'; Lienhart (yellow card) 46'; Schmid (yellow card) 59'; Höfler (yellow card) 65'	Stadium: BayArena; Attendance: 29,032; Referee: Deniz Aytekin

1 December 2019 13	Borussia Mönchengladbach	4–2	SC Freiburg	Mönchengladbach
15:30 CET (UTC+1)	Thuram 3'; Herrmann (yellow card) 36', (goal) 51'; Bénes (yellow card) 40'; Embolo 46', 71'; Jantschke (yellow card) 57'	Report	Schmid 6'; Heintz (yellow card) 30'; Höler 58'; Koch (yellow card) 84'	Stadium: Borussia-Park; Attendance: 51,080; Referee: Felix Zwayer

7 December 2019 14	SC Freiburg	1–0	VfL Wolfsburg	Freiburg
15:30 CET (UTC+1)	Schmid 85'	Report	João Victor (yellow card) 21'; Tisserand (yellow card) 88'	Stadium: Schwarzwald-Stadion; Attendance: 23,800; Referee: Bastian Dankert

14 December 2019 15	Hertha BSC	1–0	SC Freiburg	Berlin
15:30 CET (UTC+1)	Boyata (yellow card) 4'; Darida 53'; Wolf (yellow card) 90+2'	Report		Stadium: Olympiastadion; Attendance: 37,343; Referee: Frank Willenborg

18 December 2019 16	SC Freiburg	1–3	Bayern Munich	Freiburg
20:30 CET (UTC+1)	Grifo 59'	Report	Lewandowski 16', (yellow card) 69'; Müller (yellow card) 50'; Thiago (yellow card) 90'; Zirkzee 90+2'; Gnabry 90+5'	Stadium: Schwarzwald-Stadion; Attendance: 24,000; Referee: Sascha Stegemann

21 December 2019 17	Schalke 04	2–2	SC Freiburg	Gelsenkirchen
15:30 CET (UTC+1)	Serdar 26'; Kenny (yellow card) 61'; Kutucu 80'	Report	Petersen 54' (pen.); Höfler (yellow card) 59'; Grifo 67' (pen.)	Stadium: Veltins-Arena; Attendance: 61,867; Referee: Felix Brych

18 January 2020 18	Mainz 05	1–2	SC Freiburg	Mainz
15:30 CET (UTC+1)	Baku (yellow card) 26'; Hack (yellow card) 40'; Kunde (yellow card) 51'; Niakhaté (yellow card) 82'; Mateta 82'	Report	Kwon Chang-hoon 28'; Haberer (yellow card) 37'; Petersen 41'; Abrashi (yellow card) 82'	Stadium: Opel Arena; Attendance: 23,138; Referee: Sven Jablonski

25 January 2020 19	SC Freiburg	0–2	SC Paderborn	Freiburg
15:30 CET (UTC+1)	Höler (yellow card) 31'; Haberer (yellow card) 83'; Heintz (yellow card) 85'; Waldschmidt (yellow card) 90'	Report	Gjasula (yellow card) 14'; Collins (yellow card) 29' (yellow-red card) 59'; Antwi-Adjei 48'; Baumgart (yellow card) 80'; Sabiri 84' (pen.)	Stadium: Schwarzwald-Stadion; Attendance: 23,500; Referee: Christian Dingert

2 February 2020 20	1. FC Köln	4–0	SC Freiburg	Cologne
15:30 CET (UTC+1)	Jakobs (yellow card) 12', (goal) 90+3'; Córdoba (yellow card) 20', (goal) 55'; Bornauw 29'; Uth (yellow card) 50'; Ehizibue 90+1'	Report	Höfler (yellow card) 62'	Stadium: RheinEnergieStadion; Attendance: 50,000; Referee: Robert Kampka

8 February 2020 21	SC Freiburg	1–0	1899 Hoffenheim	Freiburg
15:30 CET (UTC+1)	Höler (yellow card) 39'; Waldschmidt 40' (pen.); Höfler (yellow card) 77'; Abrashi (yellow card) 90+2'	Report	Dabbur (yellow card) 39'; Rudy (yellow card) 66'; Hübner (yellow card) 80'	Stadium: Schwarzwald-Stadion; Attendance: 24,000; Referee: Sven Jablonski

15 February 2020 22	FC Augsburg	1–1	SC Freiburg	Augsburg
15:30 CET (UTC+1)	Max 38'; Baier (yellow card) 50'; Richter (yellow card) 55'; Gouweleeuw (yellow card) 80'; Khedira (yellow card) 88'	Report	Haberer 51'; Abrashi (yellow card) 59'	Stadium: WWK Arena; Attendance: 26,822; Referee: Patrick Ittrich

22 February 2020 23	SC Freiburg	0–2	Fortuna Düsseldorf	Freiburg
15:30 CET (UTC+1)	Höler (yellow card) 90+4'	Report	Ayhan (yellow card) 34'; Hoffmann 37'; Berisha (yellow card) 44'; Gießelmann (yellow card) 52'; Thommy 61'; Karaman (yellow card) 90'	Stadium: Schwarzwald-Stadion; Attendance: 24,000; Referee: Frank Willenborg

29 February 2020 24	Borussia Dortmund	1–0	SC Freiburg	Dortmund
15:30 CET (UTC+1)	Sancho 15'; Can (yellow card) 68'	Report		Stadium: Signal Iduna Park; Attendance: 81,365; Referee: Robert Hartmann

7 March 2020 25	SC Freiburg	3–1	Union Berlin	Freiburg
15:30 CET (UTC+1)	Günter (yellow card) 12', (goal) 55'; Sallai 34', (yellow card) 60'; Koch 82'	Report	Friedrich (yellow card) 47' (yellow-red card) 90+2'; Andersson 61'; Ingvartsen (yellow card) 75'	Stadium: Schwarzwald-Stadion; Attendance: 24,000; Referee: Marco Fritz

16 May 2020 26	RB Leipzig	1–1	SC Freiburg	Leipzig
15:30 CEST (UTC+2)	Poulsen 77'	Report	Sallai (yellow card) 24'; Gulde 34'	Stadium: Red Bull Arena; Attendance: 0 Referee: Manuel Gräfe
Note: The match was postponed on 13 March due to the pandemic of COVID-19 in Germany, and rescheduled to 16 May.

23 May 2020 27	SC Freiburg	0–1	Werder Bremen	Freiburg
15:30 CEST (UTC+2)		Report	Bittencourt 19'; Friedl (yellow card) 29'; Bargfrede (yellow card) 42' (yellow-red card) 88'	Stadium: Schwarzwald-Stadion; Attendance: 0 Referee: Robert Hartmann
Note: The match was postponed on 13 March due to the pandemic of COVID-19 in Germany, and rescheduled to 23 May.

26 May 2020 28	Eintracht Frankfurt	3–3	SC Freiburg	Frankfurt
20:30 CEST (UTC+2)	Rode (yellow card) 30'; Silva 35'; Ilsanker (yellow card) 67'; Kamada 79'; Chandler 82'; Hasebe (yellow card) 90+3'; Gaćinović (yellow card) 90+5'	Report	Waldschmidt (yellow card) 20'; Grifo 28'; Petersen 67'; Höler 70'	Stadium: Commerzbank-Arena; Attendance: 0 Referee: Martin Petersen
Note: The match was postponed on 24 March due to the pandemic of COVID-19 in Germany, and rescheduled to 26 May.

29 May 2020 29	SC Freiburg	0–1	Bayer Leverkusen	Freiburg
20:30 CEST (UTC+2)		Report	Havertz 54'; Alario (yellow card) 81'; Amiri (yellow card) 90+2'	Stadium: Schwarzwald-Stadion; Attendance: 0 Referee: Marco Fritz
Note: The match was postponed on 24 March due to the pandemic of COVID-19 in Germany, and rescheduled to 29 May.

5 June 2020 30	SC Freiburg	1–0	Borussia Mönchengladbach	Freiburg
20:30 CEST (UTC+2)	Waldschmidt (yellow card) 16'; Kübler (yellow card) 27'; Koch (yellow card) 40'; Petersen 58'; Höfler (yellow card) 85'	Report	Pléa (yellow card) 22' (yellow-red card) 68'; Lainer (yellow card) 45+1'	Stadium: Schwarzwald-Stadion; Attendance: 0 Referee: Markus Schmidt
Note: The match was postponed on 24 March due to the pandemic of COVID-19 in Germany, and rescheduled to 5 June.

13 June 2020 31	VfL Wolfsburg	2–2	SC Freiburg	Wolfsburg
15:30 CEST (UTC+2)	Weghorst 14', 27' (pen.)	Report	Höfler (yellow card) 23'; Höler 43'; Sallai 46'	Stadium: Volkswagen Arena; Attendance: 0 Referee: Bastian Dankert
Note: The match was postponed on 24 March due to the pandemic of COVID-19 in Germany, and rescheduled to 13 June.

16 June 2020 32	SC Freiburg	2–1	Hertha BSC	Freiburg
20:30 CEST (UTC+2)	Grifo 61'; Petersen 71'	Report	Torunarigha (yellow card) 23'; Darida (yellow card) 53'; Ibišević 66' (pen.)	Stadium: Schwarzwald-Stadion; Attendance: 0 Referee: Tobias Stieler
Note: The match was postponed on 24 March due to the pandemic of COVID-19 in Germany, and rescheduled to 16 June.

20 June 2020 33	Bayern Munich	3–1	SC Freiburg	Munich
15:30 CEST (UTC+2)	Kimmich 15'; Lewandowski 24', 37'	Report	Höler 33'	Stadium: Allianz Arena; Attendance: 0 Referee: Sören Storks
Note: The match was postponed on 24 March due to the pandemic of COVID-19 in Germany, and rescheduled to 20 June.

27 June 2020 34	SC Freiburg	4–0	Schalke 04	Freiburg
15:30 CEST (UTC+2)	Waldschmidt 20', 57'; Schmid 38'; Höler 46'; Lienhart (yellow card) 60'	Report		Stadium: Schwarzwald-Stadion; Attendance: 0 Referee: Martin Petersen
Note: The match was postponed on 7 May due to the pandemic of COVID-19 in Germany, and rescheduled to 27 June.

=== DFB-Pokal ===
10 August 2019 First round	1. FC Magdeburg	0–1 (a.e.t.)	SC Freiburg	Magdeburg
15:30 CEST (UTC+2)	Kwadwo (yellow card) 28'; Müller (yellow card) 100'; Jacobsen (yellow card) 113'	Report	Borrello (yellow card) 51'; Waldschmidt 93'; Gondorf (yellow card) 94'	Stadium: MDCC-Arena; Attendance: 14,093; Referee: Harm Osmers

29 October 2019 Second round	SC Freiburg	1–3	Union Berlin	Freiburg
18:30 CET (UTC+1)	Schlotterbeck (yellow card) 30'; Koch 45+2'; Heintz (yellow card) 76'	Report	Schmiedebach (yellow card) 21'; Mees 36'; Rapp (yellow card) 47'; Ingvartsen (yellow card) 67'; Friedrich (yellow card) 72'; Andrich 87'; Gentner 90+2'	Stadium: Schwarzwald-Stadion; Attendance: 24,000; Referee: Robert Kampka

== Statistics ==
=== Appearances and goals ===
No.	Pos	Nat	Player	Total		Bundesliga		DFB-Pokal	
No.	Pos	Nat	Player	Apps	Goals	Apps	Goals	Apps	Goals
Goalkeepers
1	GK	(Germany) GER	Alexander Schwolow	22	0	21	0	1	0
26	GK	(Netherlands) NED	Mark Flekken	10	0	9	0	1	0
40	GK	(Germany) GER	Niclas Thiede	1	0	0+1	0	0	0
Defenders
3	DF	(Austria) AUT	Philipp Lienhart	20	0	16+2	0	1+1	0
4	DF	(Germany) GER	Nico Schlotterbeck	13	0	4+8	0	1	0
5	DF	(Germany) GER	Manuel Gulde	17	1	15+2	1	0	0
7	DF	(France) FRA	Jonathan Schmid	31	4	27+2	4	2	0
17	DF	(Germany) GER	Lukas Kübler	5	0	3+2	0	0	0
23	DF	(Germany) GER	Dominique Heintz	26	0	23+1	0	2	0
24	DF	(Germany) GER	Gian-Luca Itter	1	0	0+1	0	0	0
25	DF	(Germany) GER	Robin Koch	30	2	29	1	1	1
30	DF	(Germany) GER	Christian Günter	32	2	30	2	2	0
Midfielders
6	MF	(Albania) ALB	Amir Abrashi	11	0	8+3	0	0	0
8	MF	(Germany) GER	Mike Frantz	16	0	3+11	0	2	0
16	MF	(France) FRA	Yoric Ravet	0	0	0	0	0	0
19	MF	(Germany) GER	Janik Haberer	25	2	20+4	2	1	0
21	MF	(Australia) AUS	Brandon Borrello	8	0	4+3	0	1	0
22	MF	(Hungary) HUN	Roland Sallai	19	1	11+6	1	2	0
27	MF	(Germany) GER	Nicolas Höfler	29	1	27+1	1	1	0
28	MF	(South Korea) KOR	Kwon Chang-hoon	19	2	6+13	2	0	0
32	MF	(Italy) ITA	Vincenzo Grifo	23	3	13+9	3	1	0
34	MF	(Germany) GER	Lino Tempelmann	1	0	1	0	0	0
36	MF	(Germany) GER	Yannik Keitel	1	0	0+1	0	0	0
38	MF	(Germany) GER	Florian Kath	0	0	0	0	0	0
31	MF	(Germany) GER	Fabian Rüdlin	0	0	0	0	0	0
Forwards
9	FW	(Germany) GER	Lucas Höler	32	5	24+6	5	0+2	0
11	FW	(Germany) GER	Luca Waldschmidt	20	6	11+8	5	1	1
18	FW	(Germany) GER	Nils Petersen	32	10	23+7	10	2	0
Players transferred out during the season
13	MF	(Germany) GER	Marco Terrazzino	0	0	0	0	0	0
20	MF	(Germany) GER	Jérôme Gondorf	5	0	2+2	0	0+1	0
29	FW	(South Korea) KOR	Jeong Woo-yeong	1	0	0	0	0+1	0

Last updated: 5 June 2020
Source: Competitions
