= Rüdlin =

Rüdlin is a German surname. It is a patronymic name derived from the given names Rudolf or Rüdiger, and includes the diminutive suffix -lin.

Notable people with the surname include:

- Fabian Rüdlin (born 1997), German footballer
- Otto Rüdlin (1861–1928), German jurist
