= Philipp Strompf =

German footballer (born 1998)

Phiipp Strompf
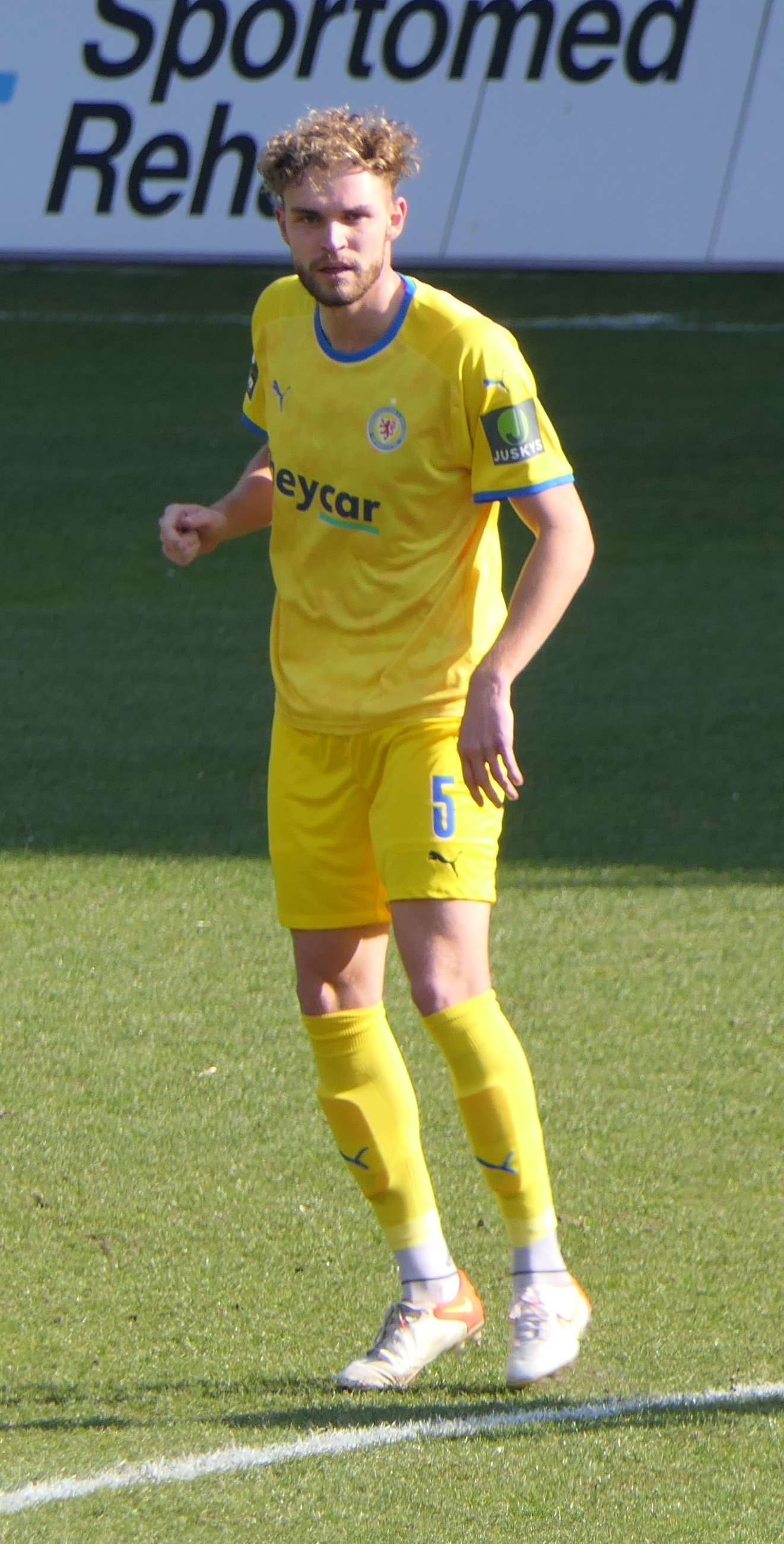
- Strompf in 2022

Personal information
- Date of birth: 23 April 1998 (age 28)
- Place of birth: Mosbach, Germany
- Height: 1.95 m (6 ft 5 in)
- Position: Centre-back

Team information
- Current team: VfL Bochum
- Number: 3

Youth career
- VfB Heidersbach
- SV Obrigheim
- SpVgg Neckarelz
- SV Sandhausen
- –2017: Karlsruher SC

Senior career*
Years	Team	Apps	(Gls)
2017–2018	FC Astoria Walldorf	30	(1)
2018–2021	Hoffenheim II	59	(2)
2021–2023	Eintracht Braunschweig	24	(2)
2023	Västerås SK	6	(0)
2024–2025	SSV Ulm	45	(2)
2025–	VfL Bochum	27	(0)
- * Club domestic league appearances and goals as of 2 May 2026

Philipp Strompf (born 23 April 1998) is a German professional footballer who plays as a centre-back for 2. Bundesliga club VfL Bochum.

== Career ==
Strompf was a youth player at SV Sandhausen and Karlsruher SC. He played for a season at FC Astoria Walldorf.

=== Hoffenheim II ===
Strompf then went to TSG 1899 Hoffenheim where he stayed for three seasons and made 59 competitive appearances for Hoffenheim II.

On 23 September 2018, he scored his first league goal for the club in a 3–0 home win against Mainz II.

=== Eintracht Braunschweig ===
Strompf joined Eintracht Braunschweig in August 2021, signing a one-year contract and was given the number five shirt.

He impressed sufficiently to be given a new contract in the summer of 2022. Sporting director Peter Vollmann described him as “reliable” and a “team player” after he played 19 games and scored 2 goals in the 2021–22 season that earned Braunschweig promotion to the 2. Bundesliga. Strompf made his 2. Bundesliga debut on 17 July 2022 in a 2–0 defeat to Hamburger SV.

=== Västerås SK ===
On 17 August 2023, Strompf signed with Västerås SK in Sweden. He made his debut for the club in the Svenska Cupen starting in a 3–0 away win against Örebro Syrianska IF. He made his Superettan debut as a second-half substitute away against Östers IF, in a 2–2 draw on 18 September 2023.

=== SSV Ulm ===
On 15 December 2023, Strompf agreed to join 3. Liga club SSV Ulm. He made his league debut for the club on 21 January 2024 against SpVgg Unterhaching in a 2–0 win for his new club. Having gained promotion with the side back into the 2. Bundesliga, he scored his first league goal for the club in a 3–1 away win against Elversberg on 22 September 2024.

=== VfL Bochum ===
In June 2025, following SSV Ulm's relegation from the 2. Bundesliga, it was announced that Strompf would join VfL Bochum, relegated from the Bundesliga, for the 2025–26 season. He signed a three-year contract.

On 2 August 2025, Strompf made his 2. Bundesliga debut in a 4–1 defeat to Darmstadt 98.

== Career statistics ==
As of match played 2 May 2026

Appearances and goals by club, season and competition
Club	Season	League			Cup		Other		Total	
Club	Season	Division	Apps	Goals	Apps	Goals	Apps	Goals	Apps	Goals
FC Astoria Walldorf	2017–18	Regionalliga Südwest	30	1	0	0	3 (Note: Appearances in Baden Cup)	1	33	1
1899 Hoffenheim II	2018–19	Regionalliga Südwest	23	2	—		—		23	2
1899 Hoffenheim II	2019–20	Regionalliga Südwest	3	0	—		—		3	0
1899 Hoffenheim II	2020–21	Regionalliga Südwest	29	0	—		—		29	0
1899 Hoffenheim II	2021–22	Regionalliga Südwest	4	0	—		—		4	0
1899 Hoffenheim II	Total		59	2	—		—		59	2
Eintracht Braunschweig	2021–22	3. Liga	19	2	0	0	1 (Note: Appearance in Lower Saxony Cup)	0	20	2
Eintracht Braunschweig	2022–23	2. Bundesliga	5	0	0	0	—		5	0
Eintracht Braunschweig	Total		24	2	0	0	1	0	25	2
Västerås SK	2023	Superettan	6	0	1	0	—		7	0
SSV Ulm	2023–24	3. Liga	17	0	0	0	1 (Note: Appearance in Württemberg Cup)	0	18	0
SSV Ulm	2024–25	2. Bundesliga	28	2	1	0	—		29	2
SSV Ulm	Total		45	2	1	0	1	0	47	2
VfL Bochum	2025–26	2. Bundesliga	27	0	2	0	—		29	0
Career total			191	7	4	0	5	1	200	7
