= Felix Higl =

German footballer

Personal information
- Date of birth: 8 January 1997 (age 29)
- Place of birth: Cologne, Germany
- Height: 1.94 m (6 ft 4 in)
- Position: Forward

Team information
- Current team: Preußen Münster
- Number: 33

Youth career
- –2012: Eintracht Freiburg
- 2012–2013: SC Freiburg
- 2013–2014: TSG Hoffenheim
- 2014–2015: Freiburger FC

Senior career*
Years	Team	Apps	(Gls)
2015	Freiburger FC	1	(0)
2015–2016	1. FC Heidenheim	0	(0)
2016–2019	Bahlinger SC	74	(10)
2019–2021	SSV Ulm	69	(27)
2021–2023	VfL Osnabrück	63	(6)
2023–2025	SSV Ulm 1846	63	(12)
2025–2026	Greuther Fürth	19	(1)
2026–	Preußen Münster	0	(0)
- * Club domestic league appearances and goals as of 18 May 2026

Felix Higl (born 8 January 1997) is a German professional footballer who plays as a forward for 3. Liga club Preußen Münster.

== Career ==
Born in Cologne, Higl played youth football for Eintracht Freiburg, SC Freiburg and TSG Hoffenheim before joining Freiburger FC in 2014. He made 1 senior appearance for Freiburger FC during the 2014–15 season, coming on as a substitute in a 1–1 Oberliga Baden-Württemberg draw with SV Spielberg in March 2015. He spent the 2015–16 season with the under-19s of 1. FC Heidenheim, before joining Bahlinger SC on a three-year contract in summer 2016. After 10 goals in 74 appearances for Bahlinger SC, Higl signed for Regionalliga Südwest club SSV Ulm in January 2019 on a two-and-a-half-year contract. Across two and a half seasons at Ulm, he scored 27 in 69 games.

In June 2021, Higl signed for VfL Osnabrück of the 3. Liga on a two-year contract.

On 24 June 2025, Higl signed a two-year contract with 2. Bundesliga club Greuther Fürth.

== Career statistics ==
As of match played 28 March 2025

Appearances and goals by club, season and competition
Club	Season	League			Cup (Note: Includes DFB Pokal)		Europe		Other		Total	
Club	Season	Division	Apps	Goals	Apps	Goals	Apps	Goals	Apps	Goals	Apps	Goals
Freiburger FC	2014–25	Oberliga Baden-Württemberg	1	0	0	0	—		—		1	0
Bahlinger SC	2016–17	Oberliga Baden-Württemberg	28	1	0	0	—		4 (Note: Appearances in the South Baden Cup)	0	32	1
Bahlinger SC	2017–18	Oberliga Baden-Württemberg	28	5	0	0	—		3	0	31	5
Bahlinger SC	2018–19	Oberliga Baden-Württemberg	18	4	0	0	—		4	1	22	8
Bahlinger SC	Total		74	10	0	0	0	0	11	1	85	11
SSV Ulm	2018–19	Regionalliga Südwest	10	9	0	0	—		3 (Note: Appearances in the Württemberg Cup)	2	13	11
SSV Ulm	2019–20	Regionalliga Südwest	20	5	1	0	—		5	5	26	10
SSV Ulm	2020–21	Regionalliga Südwest	39	13	2	1	—		4	8	45	22
SSV Ulm	Total		69	27	3	1	0	0	12	15	84	43
VfL Osnabrück	2021–22	3. Liga	36	4	2	0	—		2 (Note: Appearances in the Lower Saxony Cup)	2	40	6
VfL Osnabrück	2022–23	3. Liga	27	2	0	0	—		2	0	29	2
VfL Osnabrück	Total		63	6	2	0	0	0	4	2	69	8
SSV Ulm	2023–24	3. Liga	34	7	0	0	—		4	2	38	9
SSV Ulm	2024–25	2. Bundesliga	23	4	1	0	—		—		24	4
SSV Ulm	Total		57	11	1	0	0	0	4	2	62	13
Career total			264	54	6	1	0	0	31	20	301	75

== Personal life ==
Higl is the son of former Bundesliga player Alfons Higl.
