= Romario Rösch =

German footballer

Personal information
- Full name: Romario Steffen Rösch
- Date of birth: 1 July 1999 (age 27)
- Place of birth: Ulm, Germany
- Height: 1.82 m (6 ft 0 in)
- Position: Right winger

Team information
- Current team: Preußen Münster
- Number: 43

Youth career
- –2013: SSV Ulm
- 2013–2018: FC Augsburg

Senior career*
Years	Team	Apps	(Gls)
2018–2020	FC Augsburg II	28	(3)
2019–2020	→ Roda JC Kerkrade (loan)	26	(2)
2020–2022	Mainz 05 II	55	(6)
2021–2022	Mainz 05	1	(0)
2022–2025	SSV Ulm	90	(3)
2025–2026	VfL Bochum	5	(0)
2026–	Preußen Münster	0	(0)

International career
2016–2017	Germany U18	7	(3)
2017	Germany U19	1	(1)
- * Club domestic league appearances and goals as of 30 August 2026

Romario Steffen Rösch (born 1 July 1999) is a German professional footballer who plays as a right winger for 3. Liga club Preußen Münster.

== Career ==
Rösch made his professional debut for Roda JC Kerkrade in the Eerste Divisie on 23 August 2019, coming on as a substitute in the 66th minute for Juan Alonso against NEC, with the home match finishing as a 1–2 loss.

On 27 June 2022, Rösch returned to SSV Ulm.

On 26 June 2025, Rösch signed a one-year deal with VfL Bochum.

== Career statistics ==
As of match played 20 September 2025

Appearances and goals by club, season and competition
Club	Season	League			National cup		Europe		Other		Total	
Club	Season	Division	Apps	Goals	Apps	Goals	Apps	Goals	Apps	Goals	Apps	Goals
Augsburg II	2018–19	Regionalliga Bayern	26	3	—		—		—		26	3
Augsburg II	2020–21	Regionalliga Bayern	2	0	—		—		1 (Note: Appearance in Regionalliga Bayern League Cup)	0	3	0
Augsburg II	Total		28	3	—		—		1	0	29	3
Roda JC Kerkrade (loan)	2019–20	Eerste Divisie	26	2	2	0	—		—		28	2
Mainz 05 II	2020–21	Regionalliga Südwest	33	2	—		—		—		33	2
Mainz 05 II	2021–22	Regionalliga Südwest	32	4	—		—		—		32	4
Mainz 05 II	Total		65	6	—		—		—		65	6
Mainz 05	2021–22	Bundesliga	1	0	0	0	—		—		1	0
SSV Ulm	2022–23	Regionalliga Südwest	26	1	—		—		3 (Note: Appearances in Württemberg Cup)	1	29	2
SSV Ulm	2023–24	3. Liga	36	1	—		—		3	0	39	1
SSV Ulm	2024–25	2. Bundesliga	28	1	1	0	—		—		29	1
SSV Ulm	Total		90	3	1	0	—		6	1	97	4
VfL Bochum	2025–26	2. Bundesliga	5	0	0	0	—		—		5	0
Career total			215	14	3	0	0	0	7	1	225	15
