= Niclas Thiede =

German footballer

Personal information
- Date of birth: 14 April 1999 (age 27)
- Place of birth: Hagen, Germany
- Height: 1.87 m (6 ft 2 in)
- Position: Goalkeeper

Team information
- Current team: ADO Den Haag
- Number: 23

Youth career
- SSV Hagen
- FC Iserlohn
- Borussia Dortmund
- –2015: Rot-Weiss Essen
- 2015–2018: VfL Bochum

Senior career*
Years	Team	Apps	(Gls)
2018–2021	SC Freiburg II	37	(0)
2019–2022	SC Freiburg	1	(0)
2021–2022	→ SC Verl (loan)	29	(0)
2022–2023	SC Verl	27	(0)
2023–2026	VfL Bochum	0	(0)
2024–2025	→ SSV Ulm (loan)	17	(0)
2025–2026	VfL Bochum II	2	(1)
2026–	ADO Den Haag	0	(0)

International career^{‡}
2016–2017	Germany U18	4	(0)
2017	Germany U19	3	(0)
2019	Germany U20	2	(0)
- * Club domestic league appearances and goals as of 17 May 2026 ‡ National team caps and goals as of 14:40, 19 October 2019 (UTC)

Niclas Thiede (born 14 April 1999) is a German professional footballer who plays as a goalkeeper for Eredivisie club ADO Den Haag.

== Club career ==
Thiede made his professional debut for SC Freiburg in the Bundesliga on 19 October 2019, coming on as a substitute for the injured Alexander Schwolow in the away match against Union Berlin.

On 27 June 2022, Thiede moved to SC Verl on a permanent basis.

On 31 July 2024, Thiede joined SSV Ulm on loan.

On 15 July 2026, Thiede joined Dutch side ADO Den Haag on a two season contract, with the option for an extra season.

== Career statistics ==
As of match played 27 October 2026

Appearances and goals by club, season and competition
Club	Season	League			Cup		Other		Total	
Club	Season	Division	Apps	Goals	Apps	Goals	Apps	Goals	Apps	Goals
SC Freiburg II	2017–18	Regionalliga Südwest	19	0	—		—		19	0
SC Freiburg II	2018–19	Regionalliga Südwest	7	0	—		—		7	0
SC Freiburg II	2019–20	Regionalliga Südwest	11	0	—		—		11	0
SC Freiburg II	Total		37	0	—		—		37	0
SC Freiburg	2019–20	Bundesliga	1	0	0	0	—		1	0
SC Verl (loan)	2021–22	3. Liga	28	0	—		—		28	0
SC Verl	2022–23	3. Liga	27	0	—		—		27	0
SC Verl	Verl total		55	0	—		—		55	0
VfL Bochum	2023–24	Bundesliga	0	0	0	0	0	0	0	0
VfL Bochum	2025–26	2. Bundesliga	0	0	0	0	—		36	0
VfL Bochum	Total		0	0	0	0	0	0	0	0
SSV Ulm (loan)	2024–25	2. Bundesliga	17	0	0	0	—		17	0
VfL Bochum II	2025–26	Regionalliga West	2	0	—		—		2	0
ADO Den Haag	2026–27	Eredivisie	0	0	1	0	—		1	0
Career total			112	0	1	0	0	0	113	0
