= Semir Telalović =

German footballer (born 1999)

Personal information
- Date of birth: 23 December 1999 (age 26)
- Place of birth: Ehingen, Germany
- Height: 1.87 m (6 ft 2 in)
- Position: Forward

Team information
- Current team: Rot-Weiss Essen (on loan from 1. FC Nürnberg)
- Number: 17

Youth career
- TSG Ehingen
- SSV Ulm
- FV Olympia Laupheim
- SSV Ehingen-Süd

Senior career*
Years	Team	Apps	(Gls)
2018–2021	SSV Ehingen-Süd	58	(20)
2021–2022	FV Illertissen	23	(14)
2022–2023	Borussia Mönchengladbach	3	(0)
2022–2023	Borussia Mönchengladbach II	50	(22)
2023–2024	Blackburn Rovers	17	(0)
2024–2025	SSV Ulm	29	(12)
2025–	1. FC Nürnberg	8	(0)
2026	→ Arminia Bielefeld (loan)	14	(2)
2026–	→ Rot-Weiss Essen (loan)	0	(0)
- * Club domestic league appearances and goals as of 18 May 2026

Semir Telalović (Bosnian pronunciation: [sěmir telâːloʋitɕ]; born 23 December 1999) is a German professional footballer who plays as a forward for 3. Liga club Rot-Weiss Essen, on loan from 1. FC Nürnberg.

== Career ==
=== Early career ===
Born in the Upper Swabian town of Ehingen, Germany to Bosnian parents, Telalović started playing football at local clubs, before joining the youth setup of his hometown team SSV Ehingen-Süd. He made his senior debut against Calcio Leinfelden-Echterdingen on 6 May 2018 at the age of 18 and managed to score a goal.

In July 2021, he switched to FV Illertissen.

=== Borussia Mönchengladbach ===
In January 2022, Telalović was transferred to Borussia Mönchengladbach for an undisclosed fee. He made his official debut for the side against FC Augsburg on 25 January 2023.

=== Blackburn Rovers ===
On 1 September, EFL Championship club Blackburn Rovers announced the signing of Telalović on a three-year deal for an undisclosed fee. He made his debut for his new side on 16 September, in a 2–1 home win against Middlesbrough at Ewood Park, coming on as a 59th minute substitution for Sam Gallagher.

=== SSV Ulm ===
On 10 July 2024, Telalović joined SSV Ulm.

=== Nürnberg ===
On 30 May 2025, Telalović signed with 1. FC Nürnberg. On 2 January 2026, he was loaned by Arminia Bielefeld. On 11 July 2026, Telalović moved on a new loan to Rot-Weiss Essen.

== Career statistics ==
As of match played 4 July 2023

Appearances and goals by club, season and competition
Club	Season	League			National cup		League cup		Total	
Club	Season	Division	Apps	Goals	Apps	Goals	Apps	Goals	Apps	Goals
SSV Ehingen-Süd	2017–18	Verbandsliga Württemberg	2	1	–		–		2	1
SSV Ehingen-Süd	2018–19	Verbandsliga Württemberg	30	10	–		–		30	10
SSV Ehingen-Süd	2019–20	Verbandsliga Württemberg	15	3	–		–		15	3
SSV Ehingen-Süd	2020–21	Verbandsliga Württemberg	11	6	–		–		11	6
SSV Ehingen-Süd	Total		58	20	–		–		58	20
FV Illertissen	2021–22	Regionalliga Bayern	23	14	–		–		23	14
Borussia Mönchengladbach II	2021–22	Regionalliga West	18	6	–		–		18	6
Borussia Mönchengladbach II	2022–23	Regionalliga West	30	15	–		–		30	15
Borussia Mönchengladbach II	2023–24	Regionalliga West	2	1	–		–		2	1
Borussia Mönchengladbach II	Total		50	22	–		–		50	22
Borussia Mönchengladbach	2022–23	Bundesliga	3	0	–		–		3	0
Blackburn Rovers	2023–24	Championship	17	0	2	0	1	0	20	0
Career total			151	56	2	0	1	0	154	56
