= Laurin Ulrich =

German footballer (born 2005)

Personal information
- Date of birth: 31 January 2005 (age 21)
- Place of birth: Heidenheim an der Brenz, Germany
- Height: 1.80 m (5 ft 11 in)
- Position: Central midfielder

Team information
- Current team: SC Paderborn (on loan from VfB Stuttgart)
- Number: 28

Youth career
- –2016: TSG Nattheim
- 2016–2022: VfB Stuttgart

Senior career*
Years	Team	Apps	(Gls)
2022–	VfB Stuttgart	1	(0)
2023–	VfB Stuttgart II	41	(6)
2024	→ SSV Ulm (loan)	5	(0)
2025–2026	→ 1. FC Magdeburg (loan)	33	(3)
2026–	→ SC Paderborn (loan)	8	(0)

International career^{‡}
2020	Germany U16	2	(0)
2021–2022	Germany U17	15	(4)
2023	Germany U18	3	(1)
2023–2024	Germany U19	5	(1)
2026–	Germany U21	3	(0)
- * Club domestic league appearances and goals as of 31 October 2026 ‡ National team caps and goals as of 09:48, 14 November 2026 (UTC)

Laurin Ulrich (born 31 January 2005) is a German professional footballer who plays as a central midfielder for Bundesliga club SC Paderborn, on loan from VfB Stuttgart.

== Club career ==
Ulrich joined the VfB Stuttgart academy in 2016, from Nattheim local club TSG Nattheim.

He signed a long-term contract with the club in the summer of 2022, after having been linked with a move to Bayern Munich. According to sports magazine Kicker, the extended contract runs until 2026.

Ulrich made his professional debut for VfB Stuttgart on the 12 November 2022.

On 18 June 2024, Ulrich joined newly-promoted 2. Bundesliga side SSV Ulm on a one-year loan deal. The loan was terminated early on 30 December 2024.

On 30 June 2025, Ulrich moved on a new loan to 1. FC Magdeburg.

On 16 August 2026, Ulrich was loaned to newly promoted Bundesliga side SC Paderborn, with VfB Stuttgart extending his contract until June 2028 prior to the move.

== International career ==
Ulrich is a youth international for Germany, first receiving a call with the under-16 in October 2020. He later went on to captain the German under-17 team.

== Personal life ==
Born in Germany, Ulrich is of Indonesian descent.

== Career statistics ==
=== Club ===
As of match played 31 October 2026

Appearances and goals by club, season and competition
Club	Season	League			DFB-Pokal		Europe		Other		Total	
Club	Season	Division	Apps	Goals	Apps	Goals	Apps	Goals	Apps	Goals	Apps	Goals
VfB Stuttgart	2022–23	Bundesliga	1	0	0	0	—		—		1	0
VfB Stuttgart	2024–25	Bundesliga	0	0	0	0	0	0	—		0	0
VfB Stuttgart	Total		1	0	0	0	0	0	—		1	0
VfB Stuttgart II	2023–24	Regionalliga Südwest	23	3	—		—		—		23	3
VfB Stuttgart II	2024–25	3. Liga	18	3	—		—		—		18	3
VfB Stuttgart II	Total		41	6	—		—		—		41	6
SSV Ulm (loan)	2024–25	2. Bundesliga	5	0	—		—		—		5	0
1. FC Magdeburg (loan)	2025–26	2. Bundesliga	33	3	3	0	—		—		36	3
SC Paderborn (loan)	2026–27	Bundesliga	8	0	1	0	—		—		9	0
Career total			88	9	4	0	0	0	0	0	92	9

== Honours ==
Individual

- Fritz Walter Medal U17 Silver: 2022
