= Maurice Krattenmacher =

German footballer (born 2005)

Personal information
- Full name: Maurice Maximilian Krattenmacher
- Date of birth: 11 August 2005 (age 21)
- Place of birth: Munich, Germany
- Height: 1.80 m (5 ft 11 in)
- Positions: Attacking midfielder; winger

Team information
- Current team: SV Elversberg
- Number: 7

Youth career
- TuS Bad Aibling
- 2013–2016: Bayern Munich
- 2016–2022: SpVgg Unterhaching

Senior career*
Years	Team	Apps	(Gls)
2022–2024	SpVgg Unterhaching	49	(5)
2024–2026	Bayern Munich	0	(0)
2024–2025	→ SSV Ulm (loan)	32	(3)
2025–2026	→ Hertha BSC (loan)	22	(1)
2026–	SV Elversberg	8	(4)

International career^{‡}
2021–2022	Germany U17	7	(2)
2022–2023	Germany U18	3	(0)
2023	Germany U19	6	(3)
2024–2026	Germany U20	11	(1)
2026–	Germany U21	2	(0)
- * Club domestic league appearances and goals as of 30 October 2026 ‡ National team caps and goals as of 20:45, 17 November 2026 (UTC)

Maurice Maximilian Krattenmacher (German pronunciation: [moˈʁiːs ˈkʁatn̩maxɐ]; born 11 August 2005) is a German professional footballer who plays as an attacking midfielder and winger for Bundesliga club SV Elversberg.

== Club career ==
=== SpVgg Unterhaching ===
Krattenmacher began playing football at his local club TuS Bad Aibling before moving to Bayern Munich's youth academy in 2013, and finished his development with SpVgg Unterhaching. In 2021 he signed a professional contract with Unterhaching until 2023 with an option to extend to 2025. In 2022, he debuted with Unterhaching's senior team in the Regionalliga Bayern, and helped them win the 2022–23 Regionalliga to earn promotion to the 3. Liga.

=== Bayern Munich ===
On 6 June 2024, Krattenmacher transferred back to Bayern Munich.

On 11 June 2025, Bayern Munich announced their 32-player final squad for the FIFA Club World Cup, which included Krattenmacher.

==== Loan to SSV Ulm ====
On 20 June 2024, he joined SSV Ulm on a season-long loan, as the club achieved promotion to the 2. Bundesliga for the season ahead.

==== Loan to Hertha BSC ====
On 30 June 2025, Krattenmacher returned to the 2. Bundesliga, signing with Hertha BSC on loan for the 2025–26 season.

=== SV Elversberg ===
On 11 June 2026, after SV Elversberg secured promotion to the Bundesliga ahead of the 2026–27 season, the club agreed to the early transfer of Krattenmacher, signing a contract until 2030.

== International career ==
Krattenmacher is a youth international for Germany, having played for the Germany U17s at the 2022 UEFA European Under-17 Championship. He played for the Germany U19s in 2023.

Krattenmacher was one of the players who were called up with the Germany U21 national team by head coach Antonio Di Salvo for the friendly match against Croatia U21 on 18 November 2026.

== Career statistics ==
As of match played 30 October 2026

Appearances and goals by club, season and competition
Club	Season	League			DFB-Pokal		Other		Total	
Club	Season	Division	Apps	Goals	Apps	Goals	Apps	Goals	Apps	Goals
SpVgg Unterhaching	2022–23	Regionalliga Bayern	16	4	—		—		16	4
SpVgg Unterhaching	2023–24	3. Liga	33	1	2	0	—		35	1
SpVgg Unterhaching	Total		49	5	2	0	—		51	5
Bayern Munich	2024–25	Bundesliga	—		—		0	0	0	0
SSV Ulm (loan)	2024–25	2. Bundesliga	32	3	1	0	—		33	3
Hertha BSC (loan)	2025–26	2. Bundesliga	22	1	3	1	0	0	25	2
SV Elversberg	2026–27	Bundesliga	8	4	1	0	—		9	4
Career total			111	13	7	1	0	0	118	14

== Honours ==
SpVgg Unterhaching

- Regionalliga Bayern: 2022–23
