= Dennis Chessa =

German footballer

Personal information
- Date of birth: 19 October 1992 (age 34)
- Place of birth: Kötz, Germany
- Height: 1.75 m (5 ft 9 in)
- Position: Midfielder

Team information
- Current team: SSV Ulm
- Number: 11

Youth career
- 2007–2008: SSV Ulm
- 2008–2010: Bayern Munich

Senior career*
Years	Team	Apps	(Gls)
2010–2014	Bayern Munich II	58	(4)
2014–2016	VfR Aalen	35	(0)
2016–2017	SV Ried	21	(0)
2017–2019	KFC Uerdingen 05	26	(1)
2019–2021	FK Pirmasens	53	(12)
2021–2022	TSV Steinbach Haiger	35	(12)
2022–	SSV Ulm	123	(23)

International career
2007	Germany U-16	4	(0)
2008	Germany U-17	3	(0)
- * Club domestic league appearances and goals as of 24 September 2026

Dennis Chessa (born 19 October 1992) is a German professional footballer who plays as a midfielder for SSV Ulm.

== Career ==
=== Bayern Munich ===
Chessa joined the Bayern Munich Junior Team from SSV Ulm 1846 in 2008, and made his debut for their reserve team in April 2010, as a substitute for Christoph Knasmüllner in a 3. Liga match against Borussia Dortmund II. He was not involved with Bayern II during the 2010–11 season, which saw the club relegated from the 3. Liga, but returned to the team the following year. In 2013–14 he was a regular in the Bayern II team that won the Regionalliga Bayern title, but missed promotion after a defeat against Fortuna Köln in the playoffs.

=== VfR Aalen ===
In July 2014, Chessa signed for 2. Bundesliga side VfR Aalen. In September 2014 he made his debut in a 2. Bundesliga match against Greuther Fürth, as a substitute for Michael Klauß.

=== SV Ried ===
For the 2016–17 season, Chessa signed for Austrian Football Bundesliga side SV Ried.

== Career statistics ==
As of 1 July 2017

Appearances and goals by club, season and competition
Club	Season	League			Cup		Total		Ref.
Club	Season	League	Apps	Goals	Apps	Goals	Apps	Goals	Ref.
Bayern Munich II	2009–10	3. Liga	4	0	—		4	0	
Bayern Munich II	2010–11	3. Liga	0	0	—		0	0	
Bayern Munich II	2011–12	Regionalliga Süd	19	1	—		19	1	
Bayern Munich II	2012–13	Regionalliga Bayern	9	0	—		9	0	
Bayern Munich II	2013–14	Regionalliga Bayern	26	3	—		26	3	
Bayern Munich II	Total		58	4	—		58	4	—
Aalen	2014–15	2. Bundesliga	16	0	1	0	17	0	
Aalen	2015–16	3. Liga	19	0	1	0	20	0	
Aalen	Total		35	0	2	0	37	0	—
SV Ried	2016–17	Austrian Bundesliga	21	0	2	0	23	0	
Career total			114	4	4	0	118	4	—
