= Tom Gaal =

German footballer (born 2001)

Personal information
- Date of birth: 3 March 2003 (age 23)
- Place of birth: Mönchengladbach, Germany
- Height: 1.93 m (6 ft 4 in)
- Position: Centre-back

Team information
- Current team: St. Gallen
- Number: 26

Youth career
- SC Hardt
- 2009–2020: Borussia Mönchengladbach
- 2020–2021: VfL Wolfsburg

Senior career*
Years	Team	Apps	(Gls)
2021–2023	Borussia Mönchengladbach II	42	(0)
2023–2025	SSV Ulm	52	(5)
2025–	St. Gallen	32	(2)
- * Club domestic league appearances and goals as of 28 September 2026

Tom Gaal (born 3 March 2001) is a German professional footballer who plays as a centre-back for the Swiss Super League club St. Gallen.

== Career ==
Gaal began playing football with SC Hardt, before joining Borussia Mönchengladbach's youth academy in 2010 where he finished his development. He moved to VfL Wolfsburg in 2020 with the idea of joining their reserves but the season was cut short due to the COVID-19 pandemic. The following summer of 2021 he returned to Borussia Mönchengladbach, where he started playing with their reserves in the Regionalliga. On 26 June 2023, he transferred to SSV Ulm in the 3. Liga on a contract until 2025. He helped SSV Ulm win the 2023–24 3. Liga in his debut season and earned promotion in the 2. Bundesliga. On 23 June 2025, he joined Swiss Super League club St. Gallen on a free transfer on a contract until 2027.

== Honours ==
SSV Ulm

- 3. Liga: 2023–24

St. Gallen

- Swiss Cup: 2025-26
