= Lennart Stoll =

German footballer

Personal information
- Date of birth: 3 May 1996 (age 30)
- Place of birth: Münster, Germany
- Height: 1.89 m (6 ft 2 in)
- Position: Midfielder

Youth career
- –2012: 1. FC Gievenbeck
- 2012–2015: Preußen Münster

Senior career*
Years	Team	Apps	(Gls)
2015–2018	Preußen Münster II	16	(0)
2015–2018	Preußen Münster	41	(0)
2018–2025	SSV Ulm	131	(8)
- * Club domestic league appearances and goals as of 24 May 2025

Lennart Stoll (born 3 May 1996) is a German professional footballer who plays as a midfielder.
