= Luka Hyryläinen =

Finnish footballer (born 2004)

Personal information
- Full name: Luka-Mikael Hyryläinen
- Date of birth: 25 August 2004 (age 22)
- Place of birth: Helsinki, Finland
- Height: 1.97 m (6 ft 6 in)
- Position: Central midfielder

Team information
- Current team: 1. FC Magdeburg
- Number: 38

Youth career
- 2009–2012: LPS
- 2012–2020: HJK
- 2020–2022: Eintracht Frankfurt

Senior career*
Years	Team	Apps	(Gls)
2022–2025	TSG Hoffenheim II	30	(3)
2024–2025	→ SSV Ulm (loan)	28	(0)
2025–	1. FC Magdeburg	11	(1)

International career^{‡}
2019	Finland U15	3	(0)
2019	Finland U16	6	(0)
2021–2022	Finland U19	7	(1)
2024–	Finland U21	15	(1)
2026–	Finland	1	(0)
- * Club domestic league appearances and goals as of 30 August 2026 ‡ National team caps and goals as of 12 November 2026

Luka-Mikael Hyryläinen (born 25 August 2004) is a Finnish professional footballer who plays as a central midfielder for 2. Bundesliga club 1. FC Magdeburg and the Finland national team.

== Youth career ==
Born in Helsinki, Hyryläinen started to play football in a youth team of Laajasalon Palloseura (LPS) in Laajasalo, before joining the youth sector of HJK in 2012.

After eight years with HJK, Hyryläinen was acquired by the Bundesliga club Eintracht Frankfurt in 2020, for an undisclosed fee. He spent two seasons with the club's U17 and U19 academy squads, playing 22 games and scoring twice in total.

== Club career ==
In the summer 2022, Hyryläinen signed a three-year deal with a fellow Bundesliga side TSG Hoffenheim, for a reported transfer fee of €1 million. He missed the 2022–23 season due to an injury and returned to the line-up one year later. He was first registered to the club's reserve team TSG Hoffenheim II. During the 2023–24 season, he made 29 appearances and scored three goals, as the team finished 3rd in the Regionalliga Südwest.

On 26 June 2024, it was announced that Hyryläinen would spend the 2024–25 season on loan with a newly promoted 2. Bundesliga club SSV Ulm. His deal with Hoffenheim was simultaneously extended until June 2026.

On 19 August 2025, Hyryläinen left Hoffenheim and signed with 2. Bundesliga club 1. FC Magdeburg for a fee of around €1 million, with Hoffenheim securing a buy-back option.

== International career ==
Hyryläinen has represented Finland at under-16 and under-19 youth national team levels. After recovering from his injuries, Hyryläinen debuted with Finland U21 national team in friendly tournament Baltic Cup in June 2024. He also made six appearances in the 2025 UEFA European Under-21 Championship qualification campaign, helping Finland U21 to qualify for the final tournament, for the second time in the nation's history.

== Personal life ==
His father Aki Hyryläinen is a former international footballer and the current technical director of the Football Association of Finland.

== Career statistics ==
As of 30 August 2026

Appearances and goals by club, season and competition
Club	Season	League			National cup (Note: Includes DFB-Pokal)		Europe		Other		Total	
Club	Season	Division	Apps	Goals	Apps	Goals	Apps	Goals	Apps	Goals	Apps	Goals
TSG Hoffenheim II	2023–24	Regionalliga Südwest	29	3	0	0	—		—		29	3
TSG Hoffenheim II	2025–26	3. Liga	1	0	0	0	—		—		1	0
TSG Hoffenheim II	Total		30	3	0	0	0	0	0	0	30	3
SSV Ulm (loan)	2024–25	2. Bundesliga	28	0	1	0	—		—		29	0
1. FC Magdeburg	2025–26	2. Bundesliga	8	0	0	0	—		—		8	0
1. FC Magdeburg	2026–27	2. Bundesliga	3	1	1	0	—		—		4	1
1. FC Magdeburg	Total		11	1	1	0	0	0	0	0	11	1
Career total			67	4	2	0	0	0	0	0	71	4

=== International ===
As of match played 12 November 2026

Appearances and goals by national team and year
National team	Year	Apps	Goals
Finland	2026	1	0
Total		1	0
