= Fabian Rüdlin =

German footballer

Personal information
- Date of birth: 13 January 1997 (age 29)
- Place of birth: Müllheim, Germany
- Height: 1.76 m (5 ft 9 in)
- Position: Defensive midfielder

Team information
- Current team: SC Freiburg II
- Number: 5

Youth career
- –2008: FC Auggen
- 2008–2016: Freiburg

Senior career*
| Years | Team | Apps | (Gls) |
| 2016–2020 | SC Freiburg II | 91 | (6) |
| 2020–2023 | FC Thun | 72 | (4) |
| 2023– | SC Freiburg II | 89 | (18) |
| 2023– | SC Freiburg | 1 | (0) |
- * Club domestic league appearances and goals as of 24 September 2026

Fabian Rüdlin (born 13 January 1997) is a German professional footballer who plays as a defensive midfielder for Regionalliga Südwest club SC Freiburg II.

== Career ==
Rüdlin was born in Müllheim and started playing football in the neighboring city Auggen at local club FC Auggen. In 2008, he joined SC Freiburg and went through the teams of their youth academy. He played 19 games for the Freiburg U17 team in the Under 17 Bundesliga and 44 games for the Freiburg U19 team in the Under 19 Bundesliga. In summer 2016, he moved up from the youth teams to SC Freiburg II, which was playing in the Oberliga Baden-Württemberg at the time. The team finished the 2016–17 season in first place, securing promotion to the Regionalliga Südwest. In his four seasons of playing for Freiburg II, Rüdlin appeared in 91 matches and scored six goals for his team.

In September 2020, Rüdlin joined Swiss second division team FC Thun. In his first year at the club, he was a starting player, appearing in 30 games and scoring two goals during the 2020–21 season.

During the 2023 summer break, Rüdlin returned to his former club Freiburg II after three years at Thun. During his time at Thun, Freiburg II was promoted to the 3. Liga, and Rüdlin gave his 3. Liga debut on 6 August 2023, in a 1–1 draw against MSV Duisburg. In September 2023, Christian Streich included him in the squad of Freiburg's first team for the first time. He made his first (and so far only) appearance in the Bundesliga on 8 October 2023 in a 3–0 away defeat against Bayern Munich after coming on as a substitute.
