= Aaron Keller (footballer) =

Swiss footballer (born 2004)

Personal information
- Date of birth: 15 May 2004 (age 22)
- Place of birth: Switzerland
- Height: 1.81 m (5 ft 11 in)
- Position: Striker

Team information
- Current team: Greuther Fürth
- Number: 11

Youth career
- –2017: Hong Kong Football Club
- 2017–2018: DFI Bad Aibling
- 2018–2023: SpVgg Unterhaching

Senior career*
Years	Team	Apps	(Gls)
2021–2025	SpVgg Unterhaching	42	(9)
2024–2025	→ SSV Ulm (loan)	28	(4)
2025–	Greuther Fürth	30	(2)
- * Club domestic league appearances and goals as of 18 May 2026

Aaron Keller (born 15 May 2004) is a Swiss footballer who plays as a striker for German 2. Bundesliga club Greuther Fürth.

== Early and personal life ==
Keller was born in 2004 in Switzerland. He is of Brazilian descent. He grew up in Hong Kong and moved to Germany at the age of twelve.

== Career ==
Keller started his career with German side SpVgg Unterhaching. On 15 July 2021, he debuted for the club during a 0–0 draw with TSV Aubstadt.

On 25 June 2024, Keller extended his Unterhaching contract by a year to 2026, and joined SSV Ulm on a year-long loan.

On 18 June 2025, Keller moved to Greuther Fürth on a four-year contract.

== Style of play ==
Keller mainly operates as a striker. He is known for his speed.
