= 2026–27 Hannover 96 season =

Hannover 96
2026–27 season
- Manager: Christian Titz (until 14 September); Lars Barlemann (interim, 14–20 September); Sandro Wagner (from 21 September)
- Stadium: Heinz von Heiden Arena
- 2. Bundesliga: 8th
- DFB-Pokal: Second round
- Top goalscorer: League: Lars Gindorf; Marcel Hartel; Stefán Teitur Þórðarson (3 each); All: Lars Gindorf (6)
- Highest home attendance: 49,000; Hannover v Wolfsburg
- Lowest home attendance: 33,100; Hannover v Fürth
- Average home league attendance: 41,300
- Biggest win: Hemelingen 1–9 Hannover
- Biggest defeat: Magdeburg 3–0 Hannover
Home colours	Away colours	Third colours
- All statistics correct as of 21 November 2026.

The 2026–27 Hannover 96 season is the 131st season in the football club's history and 31st overall and eighth consecutive season in the second flight of German football, the 2. Bundesliga. Hannover 96 also participates in this season's edition of the domestic cup, the DFB-Pokal. This is the 68th season for Hannover in the Heinz von Heiden Arena, located in Hanover, Lower Saxony, Germany.

== Players ==
=== Squad information ===
As of 25 October 2026

Note: Flags indicate national team as defined under FIFA eligibility rules; some limited exceptions apply. Players may hold more than one non-FIFA nationality.

No.	Pos.	Nation	Player
1	GK	SUI	Pascal Loretz
3	DF	GER	Boris Tomiak
4	DF	FRA	Jean Hugonet (vice-captain)
5	DF	ROU	Virgil Ghiță
7	FW	SLE	Mustapha Bundu
8	MF	FRA	Waniss Taïbi
9	FW	FIN	Benjamin Källman
10	MF	GER	Marcel Hartel
11	FW	AUT	Benedikt Pichler
13	MF	GER	Franz Roggow
14	MF	LBN	Husseyn Chakroun
16	DF	GER	Karl Steinmann (on loan from SC Freiburg)
17	DF	GER	Bastian Allgeier
20	DF	RSA	Ime Okon
21	MF	MAW	Mwisho Mhango
22	MF	GER	Noah Engelbreth

No.	Pos.	Nation	Player
23	MF	ISL	Stefán Teitur Þórðarson (captain)
24	MF	GER	Yunus Ünal
25	MF	GER	Lars Gindorf
26	FW	GER	Tom Hobrecht
27	DF	JPN	Hayate Matsuda
28	FW	GER	Taycan Etçibaşı
29	MF	SWE	Kolja Oudenne
30	GK	GER	Leo Weinkauf
33	DF	GER	Maurice Neubauer (vice-captain)
35	DF	GER	Joschua Siewert
37	MF	GER	Alexander Vogel
39	FW	TUR	Taycan Kurt
40	GK	GER	Jonas Schwanke
44	MF	KOS	Emir Sahiti
49	FW	GER	Merlin Sinanović

=== Out on loan ===
Note: Flags indicate national team as defined under FIFA eligibility rules; some limited exceptions apply. Players may hold more than one non-FIFA nationality.

No.	Pos.	Nation	Player
19	DF	FRA	William Kokolo (on loan to Nacional until 30 June 2027)

=== Transfers ===
==== In ====
No.	Pos	Player	From	Type	Window	Ends	Fee	Source
1	GK	(Switzerland) Pascal Loretz	(Switzerland) Luzern	Transfer	Summer	30 June 2030	€1,100,000	
4	DF	(France) Jean Hugonet	(Germany) 1. FC Magdeburg	Transfer	Summer	30 June 2030	Free	
10	MF	(Germany) Marcel Hartel	(United States) St. Louis City SC	Transfer	Summer	30 June 2029	€1,000,000	
16	DF	(Germany) Karl Steinmann	(Germany) SC Freiburg	Loan	Summer	30 June 2027	Free	
18	MF	(Japan) Daisuke Yokota	(Belgium) Gent	Transfer (Note: Previously on loan.)	Summer	30 June 2029	€1,500,000	
24	MF	(Germany) Yunus Ünal	(Germany) Hertha BSC II	Transfer	Summer	30 June 2030	Free	
25	MF	(Germany) Lars Gindorf	(Germany) Alemannia Aachen	Return from loan	Summer	30 June 2027	–	
28	FW	(Germany) Taycan Etçibaşı	(Germany) Borussia Dortmund U19	Transfer	Summer	30 June 2029	€500,000	
32	MF	(Germany) Jonas Sterner	(Germany) Dynamo Dresden	Return from loan	Summer	30 June 2028	–	
35	GK	(Germany) Leon-Oumar Wechsel	(Germany) Jahn Regensburg	Return from loan	Summer	30 June 2027	–	
44	MF	(Kosovo) Emir Sahiti	(Germany) Hamburger SV	Transfer	Summer	30 June 2028	Free	
–	MF	(Germany) Jannik Rochelt	(Germany) Arminia Bielefeld	Return from loan	Summer	30 June 2027	–	

==== Out ====
No.	Pos	Player	To	Type	Window	Fee	Source
1	GK	(Germany) Nahuel Noll	(Germany) TSG Hoffenheim	End of loan	Summer	–	
4	DF	(Germany) Hendry Blank	(Austria) Red Bull Salzburg	End of loan	Summer	–	
6	DF	(Poland) Maik Nawrocki	(Scotland) Celtic	End of loan	Summer	–	
8	MF	(Germany) Enzo Leopold	(Germany) Borussia Mönchengladbach	End of contract	Summer	–	
10	MF	(Germany) Noah Weißhaupt	(Germany) SC Freiburg	End of loan	Summer	–	
15	MF	(Germany) Noël Aséko Nkili	(Germany) Bayern Munich	End of loan	Summer	€500,000 (Note: Hannover 96 made use of their option to purchase Aséko for €1,000,000, prompting Bayern Munich to make use of their option to purchase him back for €1,500,000.)	
16	FW	(Norway) Håvard Nielsen	(Norway) Vålerenga	End of contract	Summer	–	
18	MF	(Japan) Daisuke Yokota	(Scotland) Rangers	Transfer	Summer	€3,000,000	
19	DF	(France) William Kokolo	(Portugal) Nacional	Loan	Summer	Free	
24	FW	(Tunisia) Elias Saad	(Germany) FC Augsburg	End of loan	Summer	–	
32	MF	(Germany) Jonas Sterner	(Germany) Dynamo Dresden	Transfer	Summer	€350,000	
35	GK	(Germany) Leon-Oumar Wechsel	(Germany) Eintracht Trier	Transfer	Summer	Free	
37	DF	(Germany) Brooklyn Ezeh	(Germany) Dynamo Dresden	End of contract	Summer	–	
–	MF	(Germany) Jannik Rochelt	(Germany) Arminia Bielefeld	Transfer	Summer	€400,000	

== Friendly matches ==
Win Draw Loss

1 July 2026 Friendly	TSV Pattensen (Germany)	1–6	(Germany) Hannover 96	Pattensen
18:00 CEST (UTC+2)	Schäfer 80'	Report	Tomiak 12'; Oudenne 45'; Yokota 61'; Vogel 63'; Källman 90+1', 90+2'	Stadium: Stadion an der Schützenallee; Attendance: 2,200; Referee: Nico Schünemann

4 July 2026 Friendly	SV Ramlingen/Ehlershausen (Germany)	0–7	(Germany) Hannover 96	Burgdorf
14:30 CEST (UTC+2)		Report	Roggow 6'; Þórðarson 25', 30'; Gindorf 57', 77', 88'; Kurt 70'	Stadium: Wahrendorff-Arena; Referee: Alexander Jahn

7 July 2026 Friendly	Hannover 96 (Germany)	3–1	(Germany) Phönix Lübeck	Hanover
14:00 CEST (UTC+2)	Matsuda 55'; Vogel 68'; Hobrecht 77'	Report	Kliti 79'	Stadium: Eilenriedestadion; Referee: Robert Schröder

11 July 2026 Friendly	SC Paderborn (Germany)	3–2	(Germany) Hannover 96	Paderborn
11:30 CEST (UTC+2)	Tigges 58'; Marino 77', 98'	Report	Hugonet 33'; Gindorf 60'	Stadium: Trainings- und Nachwuchsleistungszentrum; Attendance: 0 Referee: Florian Exner
Note: The match lasted for 4×30 minutes.

18 July 2026 Friendly	Hannover 96 (Germany)	2–1	(Germany) VfL Osnabrück	Iserlohn
14:00 CEST (UTC+2)	Källman 35'; Roggow 68'	Report	Henning 53'	Stadium: Hemberg-Stadion; Attendance: 0 Referee: Felix Weller
Note: The match lasted for 4×30 minutes.

24 July 2026 Friendly	Hannover 96 (Germany)	1–0	(Germany) Preußen Münster	Iserlohn
12:30 CEST (UTC+2)	Källman 67'	Report		Stadium: Hemberg-Stadion; Attendance: 0 Referee: Henry Schröder

24 July 2026 Friendly	Hannover 96 (Germany)	2–0	(Germany) Preußen Münster	Iserlohn
14:30 CEST (UTC+2)	Roggow 56' (pen.); Demir 89'	Report		Stadium: Hemberg-Stadion; Attendance: 0 Referee: Leonidas Exuzidis

31 July 2026 Friendly	Hannover 96 (Germany)	3–2	(Germany) Fortuna Düsseldorf	Hanover
17:00 CEST (UTC+2)	Pichler 18'; Roggow 40'; Hobrecht 53'	Report	Schleusener 66' (pen.); Fernandes Gonçalves 89'	Stadium: Eilenriedestadion; Attendance: 0 Referee: Lennart Kernchen

1 August 2026 Friendly	Hannover 96 (Germany)	3–0	(Netherlands) PEC Zwolle	Hanover
14:00 CEST (UTC+2)	Oudenne 52', 87'; Gindorf 63' (pen.)	Report		Stadium: Heinz von Heiden Arena; Attendance: 12,500; Referee: Felix Bickel

3 October 2026 Friendly	Hannover 96 (Germany)	2–0	(Germany) SC Verl	Hanover
13:00 CEST (UTC+2)	Hartel 10' (pen.); Roggow 35'	Report		Stadium: Heinz von Heiden Arena; Attendance: 4,500

12 November 2026 Friendly	Hannover 96 (Germany)	6–1	(Germany) TSV Havelse	Hanover
12:00 CET (UTC+1)	Hobrecht 19', 29', 45'; Roggow 45+3'; Ahlberg 63'; Oudenne 87'	Report	Müller 55'	Stadium: Eilenriedestadion; Attendance: 550; Referee: Björn Behrens

== Competitions ==
Win Draw Loss

=== Overview ===
Competition	First match	Last match	Starting round	Final position	Record							
Competition	First match	Last match	Starting round	Final position	Pld	W	D	L	GF	GA	GD	Win %
2. Bundesliga	9 August 2026	23 May 2027	Matchday 1		12	4	3	5	14	19	−5	33.33
DFB-Pokal	22 August 2026	28 October 2026	First round	Second round	2	1	0	1	9	3	+6	50.00
Total					14	5	3	6	23	22	+1	35.71

Last updated: 21 November 2026
Source: Competitions

=== 2. Bundesliga ===
==== League table ====
Pos	Team	Pld	W	D	L	GF	GA	GD	Pts
6	Arminia Bielefeld	12	5	2	5	19	18	+1	17
7	1. FC Heidenheim	12	4	4	4	20	23	−3	16
8	Hannover 96	12	4	3	5	14	19	−5	15
9	Eintracht Braunschweig	12	4	2	6	18	19	−1	14
10	VfL Bochum	11	4	2	5	11	13	−2	14

Updated to match(es) played on 21 November 2026. Source: Bundesliga
Rules for classification: 1) Points; 2) Goal difference; 3) Goals scored; 4) Head-to-head results; 5) Head-to-head away goals scored; 6) Away goals scored; 7) Play-off.
(Rules 4–6 only apply after home and away matches have been played between the tied teams.)

==== Results summary ====
Overall								Home						Away					
Pld	W	D	L	GF	GA	GD	Pts	W	D	L	GF	GA	GD	W	D	L	GF	GA	GD
12	4	3	5	14	19	−5	15	3	2	1	9	7	+2	1	1	4	5	12	−7

Last updated: 21 November 2026.
Source: DFB

==== Results by round ====
Round	1	2	3	4	5	6	7	8	9	10	11	12	13	14	15	16	17	18	19	20	21	22	23	24	25	26	27	28	29	30	31	32	33	34
Ground	A	H	A	H	A	H	A	H	A	H	A	H	A	H	A	H	A	H	A	H	A	H	A	H	A	H	A	H	A	H	A	H	A	H
Result	L	L	W	D	L	W	L	D	L	W	D	W																						
Position	16	17	13	13	15	10	13	14	16	12	11																							

Updated to match(es) played on 21 November 2026. Source: DFB
A = Away; H = Home; W = Win; D = Draw; L = Loss

==== Matches ====
9 August 2026 1	Energie Cottbus	3–1	Hannover 96	Cottbus
13:30 CEST (UTC+2)	Ciğerci 14', 71' (pen.); Butler 76'	Report	Neubauer 28'	Stadium: LEAG Energie Stadion; Attendance: 18,361; Referee: Lars Erbst

16 August 2026 2	Hannover 96	0–1	VfL Wolfsburg	Hanover
13:30 CEST (UTC+2)		Report	Reese 87' (pen.)	Stadium: Heinz von Heiden Arena; Attendance: 49,000; Referee: Timo Gansloweit

30 August 2026 3	Darmstadt 98	0–1	Hannover 96	Darmstadt
13:30 CEST (UTC+2)		Report	Gindorf 57' (pen.)	Stadium: Merck-Stadion am Böllenfalltor; Attendance: 17,810; Referee: Timo Gerach

4 September 2026 4	Hannover 96	2–2	Karlsruher SC	Hanover
18:30 CEST (UTC+2)	Gindorf 26'; Hartel 38'	Report	Fukuda 28'; Pinto Pedrosa 85'	Stadium: Heinz von Heiden Arena; Attendance: 39,600; Referee: Tom Bauer

11 September 2026 5	1. FC Nürnberg	2–1	Hannover 96	Nuremberg
18:30 CEST (UTC+2)	Justvan 5'; Zoma 65'	Report	Gindorf 8' (pen.)	Stadium: Max-Morlock-Stadion; Attendance: 41,202; Referee: Florian Lechner

20 September 2026 6	Hannover 96	2–1	VfL Bochum	Hanover
13:30 CEST (UTC+2)	Þórðarson 24'; Hartel 43'	Report	Meyer 77'	Stadium: Heinz von Heiden Arena; Attendance: 40,200; Referee: Patrick Schwengers

10 October 2026 7	1. FC Magdeburg	3–0	Hannover 96	Magdeburg
13:00 CEST (UTC+2)	Kwarteng 3'; Iyoha 30'; Żukowski 86'	Report		Stadium: Avnet Arena; Attendance: 26,502; Referee: Sascha Stegemann

17 October 2026 8	Hannover 96	1–1	FC St. Pauli	Hanover
20:30 CEST (UTC+2)	Chakroun 48'	Report	Ceesay 45+1'	Stadium: Heinz von Heiden Arena; Attendance: 48,700; Referee: Felix Prigan

25 October 2026 9	Eintracht Braunschweig	2–0	Hannover 96	Braunschweig
13:30 CET (UTC+1)	Marie 17'; Sturm 90+2'	Report		Stadium: Eintracht-Stadion; Attendance: 22,175; Referee: Tobias Reichel

1 November 2026 10	Hannover 96	2–1	Dynamo Dresden	Hanover
13:30 CET (UTC+1)	Chakroun 54'; Hartel 61' (pen.)	Report	Rapp 11'	Stadium: Heinz von Heiden Arena; Attendance: 37,200; Referee: Felix Weller

8 November 2026 11	1. FC Heidenheim	2–2	Hannover 96	Heidenheim
13:30 CET (UTC+1)	Siersleben 43'; Zivzivadze 66'	Report	Þórðarson 55'; Hugonet 63'	Stadium: Voith-Arena; Attendance: 14,500; Referee: Robin Braun

21 November 2026 12	Hannover 96	2–1	Greuther Fürth	Hanover
13:00 CET (UTC+1)	Þórðarson 57'; Taïbi 90+2'	Report	Pohlmann 34'	Stadium: Heinz von Heiden Arena; Attendance: 33,100; Referee: Marc Philip Eckermann

28 November 2026 13	VfL Osnabrück	v	Hannover 96	Osnabrück
20:30 CET (UTC+1)				Stadium: Stadion an der Bremer Brücke

4–6 December 2026 14	Hannover 96	v	Hertha BSC	Hanover
				Stadium: Heinz von Heiden Arena

11–13 December 2026 15	Holstein Kiel	v	Hannover 96	Kiel
				Stadium: Holstein-Stadion

18–20 December 2026 16	Hannover 96	v	1. FC Kaiserslautern	Hanover
				Stadium: Heinz von Heiden Arena

15–17 January 2027 17	Arminia Bielefeld	v	Hannover 96	Bielefeld
				Stadium: SchücoArena

22–24 January 2027 18	Hannover 96	v	Energie Cottbus	Hanover
				Stadium: Heinz von Heiden Arena

29–31 January 2027 19	VfL Wolfsburg	v	Hannover 96	Wolfsburg
				Stadium: Volkswagen Arena

5–7 February 2027 20	Hannover 96	v	Darmstadt 98	Hanover
				Stadium: Heinz von Heiden Arena

12–14 February 2027 21	Karlsruher SC	v	Hannover 96	Karlsruhe
				Stadium: BBBank Wildpark

19–21 February 2027 22	Hannover 96	v	1. FC Nürnberg	Hanover
				Stadium: Heinz von Heiden Arena

26–28 February 2027 23	VfL Bochum	v	Hannover 96	Bochum
				Stadium: Vonovia Ruhrstadion

2–4 March 2027 24	Hannover 96	v	1. FC Magdeburg	Hanover
				Stadium: Heinz von Heiden Arena

5–7 March 2027 25	FC St. Pauli	v	Hannover 96	Hamburg
				Stadium: Millerntor-Stadion

12–14 March 2027 26	Hannover 96	v	Eintracht Braunschweig	Hanover
				Stadium: Heinz von Heiden Arena

19–21 March 2027 27	Dynamo Dresden	v	Hannover 96	Dresden
				Stadium: Rudolf-Harbig-Stadion

2–4 April 2027 28	Hannover 96	v	1. FC Heidenheim	Hanover
				Stadium: Heinz von Heiden Arena

9–11 April 2027 29	Greuther Fürth	v	Hannover 96	Fürth
				Stadium: Sportpark Ronhof Thomas Sommer

16–18 April 2027 30	Hannover 96	v	VfL Osnabrück	Hanover
				Stadium: Heinz von Heiden Arena

23–25 April 2027 31	Hertha BSC	v	Hannover 96	Berlin
				Stadium: Olympiastadion

7–9 May 2027 32	Hannover 96	v	Holstein Kiel	Hanover
				Stadium: Heinz von Heiden Arena

14–16 May 2027 33	1. FC Kaiserslautern	v	Hannover 96	Kaiserslautern
				Stadium: Fritz-Walter-Stadion

23 May 2027 34	Hannover 96	v	Arminia Bielefeld	Hanover
15:30 CEST (UTC+2)				Stadium: Heinz von Heiden Arena

=== DFB-Pokal ===
22 August 2026 First round	SV Hemelingen	1–9	Hannover 96	Bremen
15:30 CEST (UTC+2)	Fikaj 56'	Report	Þórðarson 5', 19'; Gindorf 11', 39', 53'; Hartel 16'; Pichler 21', 88'; Etçibaşı 90+1'	Stadium: Weserstadion; Attendance: 13,217; Referee: Martin Wilke

28 October 2026 Second round	Hannover 96	0–2	1. FC Kaiserslautern	Hanover
20:45 CET (UTC+1)		Report	Luković 14'; Prtajin 86'	Stadium: Heinz von Heiden Arena; Attendance: 35,800; Referee: Konrad Oldhafer

== Statistics ==
=== Appearances and goals ===
As of 21 November 2026

No.	Pos	Player	2. Bundesliga		DFB-Pokal		Total	
No.	Pos	Player	Apps	Goals	Apps	Goals	Apps	Goals
1	GK	(Switzerland) Pascal Loretz	1	0	1	0	2	0
3	DF	(Germany) Boris Tomiak	12	0	2	0	14	0
4	DF	(France) Jean Hugonet	8	1	2	0	10	1
5	DF	(Romania) Virgil Ghiță	8+2	0	1	0	11	0
7	FW	(Sierra Leone) Mustapha Bundu	4+3	0	0	0	7	0
8	MF	(France) Waniss Taïbi	8+3	1	1	0	12	1
9	FW	(Finland) Benjamin Källman	8+4	0	1+1	0	14	0
10	MF	(Germany) Marcel Hartel	11	3	2	1	13	4
11	FW	(Austria) Benedikt Pichler	2+6	0	1	2	9	2
13	MF	(Germany) Franz Roggow	5+4	0	1+1	0	11	0
14	FW	(Lebanon) Husseyn Chakroun	5+4	2	1+1	0	11	2
16	DF	(Germany) Karl Steinmann	0	0	0	0	0	0
17	DF	(Germany) Bastian Allgeier	7+4	0	0	0	11	0
19	DF	(France) William Kokolo	0	0	0	0	0	0
20	DF	(South Africa) Ime Okon	1+6	0	1	0	8	0
21	MF	(Malawi) Mwisho Mhango	0+1	0	0+1	0	2	0
22	MF	(Germany) Noah Engelbreth	0+1	0	0	0	1	0
23	MF	(Iceland) Stefán Teitur Þórðarson	10+1	3	1+1	2	13	5
24	MF	(Germany) Yunus Ünal	0	0	0+1	0	1	0
25	MF	(Germany) Lars Gindorf	6+1	3	1	3	8	6
26	FW	(Germany) Tom Hobrecht	0+1	0	0+1	0	2	0
27	DF	(Japan) Hayate Matsuda	3+5	0	1	0	9	0
28	FW	(Germany) Taycan Etçibaşı	0+3	0	0+1	1	4	1
29	MF	(Sweden) Kolja Oudenne	10+1	0	1+1	0	13	0
30	GK	(Germany) Leo Weinkauf	11	0	1	0	12	0
32	MF	(Japan) Asuma Ikari	0+1	0	0	0	1	0
33	DF	(Germany) Maurice Neubauer	10	1	2	0	12	1
35	DF	(Germany) Joschua Siewert	0	0	0	0	0	0
37	MF	(Germany) Alexander Vogel	0	0	0	0	0	0
38	MF	(Germany) Jasper Reinhold	0+1	0	0	0	1	0
39	FW	(Turkey) Taycan Kurt	0	0	0	0	0	0
40	GK	(Germany) Jonas Schwanke	0	0	0	0	0	0
44	MF	(Kosovo) Emir Sahiti	2+2	0	1	0	5	0
49	FW	(Germany) Merlin Sinanović	0+2	0	0+1	0	3	0

=== Goalscorers ===
As of 21 November 2026

Rank	No.	Pos	Name	2. Bundesliga	DFB-Pokal	Total
1	25	MF	(Germany) Lars Gindorf	3	3	6
2	23	MF	(Iceland) Stefán Teitur Þórðarson	3	2	5
3	10	MF	(Germany) Marcel Hartel	3	1	4
4	11	FW	(Austria) Benedikt Pichler	0	2	2
4	14	FW	(Lebanon) Husseyn Chakroun	2	0	2
6	4	DF	(France) Jean Hugonet	1	0	1
6	8	MF	(France) Waniss Taïbi	1	0	1
6	28	FW	(Germany) Taycan Etçibaşı	0	1	1
6	33	DF	(Germany) Maurice Neubauer	1	0	1
Total				14	9	23

=== Clean sheets ===
As of 21 November 2026

Rank	No.	Pos	Name	2. Bundesliga	DFB-Pokal	Total
1	30	GK	(Germany) Leo Weinkauf	1	0	1
Total				1	0	1

=== Disciplinary record ===
As of 21 November 2026

Rank	No.	Pos	Name	2. Bundesliga			DFB-Pokal			Total		
Rank	No.	Pos	Name	Yellow card	(yellow card) (yellow-red card)	Red card	Yellow card	(yellow card) (yellow-red card)	Red card	Yellow card	(yellow card) (yellow-red card)	Red card
1	4	DF	(France) Jean Hugonet	4	0	0	1	0	0	5	0	0
1	13	MF	(Germany) Franz Roggow	4	0	0	1	0	0	5	0	0
3	3	DF	(Germany) Boris Tomiak	4	0	0	0	0	0	4	0	0
4	23	MF	(Iceland) Stefán Teitur Þórðarson	3	0	0	0	0	0	3	0	0
5	14	FW	(Lebanon) Husseyn Chakroun	1	0	0	1	0	0	2	0	0
5	33	DF	(Germany) Maurice Neubauer	2	0	0	0	0	0	2	0	0
7	5	DF	(Romania) Virgil Ghiță	1	0	0	0	0	0	1	0	0
7	8	MF	(France) Waniss Taïbi	1	0	0	0	0	0	1	0	0
7	10	MF	(Germany) Marcel Hartel	1	0	0	0	0	0	1	0	0
7	17	DF	(Germany) Bastian Allgeier	1	0	0	0	0	0	1	0	0
7	25	MF	(Germany) Lars Gindorf	1	0	0	0	0	0	1	0	0
7	44	MF	(Kosovo) Emir Sahiti	1	0	0	0	0	0	1	0	0
Total				24	0	0	3	0	0	27	0	0
