= 2025–26 Hannover 96 season =

Hannover 96
2025–26 season
- Manager: Christian Titz
- Stadium: Heinz von Heiden Arena
- 2. Bundesliga: 4th
- DFB-Pokal: First round
- Top goalscorer: League: Benjamin Källman (14); All: Benjamin Källman (14)
- Highest home attendance: 49,000; Hannover v Kaiserslautern; Hannover v Hertha; Hannover v Bielefeld; Hannover v Schalke; Hannover v Paderborn; Hannover v Münster; Hannover v Nürnberg
- Lowest home attendance: 32,400; Hannover v Kiel
- Average home league attendance: 42,794
- Biggest win: Braunschweig 0–3 Hannover; Hannover 3–0 Karlsruhe
- Biggest defeat: Hannover 0–3 Hertha; Hannover 0–3 Schalke
Home colours	Away colours	Third colours

The 2025–26 Hannover 96 season was the 130th season in the football club's history and 30th overall and seventh consecutive season in the second flight of German football, the 2. Bundesliga. Hannover 96 also participated in this season's edition of the domestic cup, the DFB-Pokal. This was the 67th season for Hannover in the Heinz von Heiden Arena, located in Hanover, Lower Saxony, Germany.

== Players ==
=== Squad information ===
As of 14 January 2026

Note: Flags indicate national team as defined under FIFA eligibility rules; some limited exceptions apply. Players may hold more than one non-FIFA nationality.

No.	Pos.	Nation	Player
1	GK	GER	Nahuel Noll (on loan from TSG Hoffenheim)
3	DF	GER	Boris Tomiak
4	DF	GER	Hendry Blank (on loan from Red Bull Salzburg)
5	DF	ROU	Virgil Ghiță (vice-captain)
6	DF	POL	Maik Nawrocki (on loan from Celtic)
7	FW	SLE	Mustapha Bundu
8	MF	GER	Enzo Leopold (captain)
9	FW	FIN	Benjamin Källman
10	FW	GER	Noah Weißhaupt (on loan from SC Freiburg)
11	FW	AUT	Benedikt Pichler
13	MF	GER	Franz Roggow
14	MF	LBN	Husseyn Chakroun
15	MF	GER	Noël Aséko Nkili (on loan from Bayern Munich)
16	FW	NOR	Håvard Nielsen
17	DF	GER	Bastian Allgeier
18	FW	JPN	Daisuke Yokota (on loan from Gent)

No.	Pos.	Nation	Player
19	DF	FRA	William Kokolo
20	DF	RSA	Ime Okon
21	MF	MWI	Mwisho Mhango
22	MF	GER	Noah Engelbreth
23	MF	ISL	Stefán Teitur Þórðarson
24	FW	TUN	Elias Saad (on loan from FC Augsburg)
26	MF	FRA	Waniss Taïbi
27	DF	JPN	Hayate Matsuda
29	MF	SWE	Kolja Oudenne
30	GK	GER	Leo Weinkauf
33	DF	GER	Maurice Neubauer
34	FW	GER	Denis Husser
37	DF	GER	Brooklyn Ezeh
39	FW	TUR	Taycan Kurt
40	GK	GER	Jonas Schwanke

=== Out on loan ===
Note: Flags indicate national team as defined under FIFA eligibility rules; some limited exceptions apply. Players may hold more than one non-FIFA nationality.

No.	Pos.	Nation	Player
10	MF	GER	Jannik Rochelt (on loan to Arminia Bielefeld until 30 June 2026)
25	MF	GER	Lars Gindorf (on loan to Alemannia Aachen until 30 June 2026)
32	MF	GER	Jonas Sterner (on loan to Dynamo Dresden until 30 June 2026)
35	GK	GER	Leon-Oumar Wechsel (on loan to Jahn Regensburg until 30 June 2026)

=== Transfers ===
==== In ====
No.	Pos	Player	From	Type	Window	Ends	Fee	Source
1	GK	(Germany) Nahuel Noll	(Germany) TSG Hoffenheim	Loan	Summer	30 June 2026	Free	
4	DF	(Germany) Hendry Blank	(Austria) Red Bull Salzburg	Loan	Summer	30 June 2026	Free	
5	DF	(Romania) Virgil Ghiță	(Poland) Cracovia	Transfer	Summer	30 June 2028	€700,000	
6	DF	(Poland) Maik Nawrocki	(Scotland) Celtic	Loan	Summer	30 June 2026	Free	
7	FW	(Sierra Leone) Mustapha Bundu	(England) Plymouth Argyle	Transfer	Summer	30 June 2028	Free	
9	FW	(Finland) Benjamin Källman	(Poland) Cracovia	Transfer	Summer	30 June 2028	Free	
11	FW	(Austria) Benedikt Pichler	(Germany) Holstein Kiel	Transfer	Summer	30 June 2027	€600,000	
13	MF	(Germany) Franz Roggow	(Germany) Borussia Dortmund II	Transfer	Summer	30 June 2028	Free	
17	DF	(Germany) Bastian Allgeier	(Germany) SSV Ulm	Transfer	Summer	30 June 2027	Free	
18	MF	(Japan) Daisuke Yokota	(Belgium) Gent	Loan	Summer	30 June 2026	Free	
19	DF	(France) William Kokolo	(France) Laval	Transfer	Summer	30 June 2028	€500,000	
20	DF	(South Africa) Ime Okon	(South Africa) SuperSport United	Transfer	Summer	30 June 2029	Free	
21	MF	(Germany) Marius Wörl	(Germany) Arminia Bielefeld	Return from loan	Summer	30 June 2027	€200,000 (Note: Arminia Bielefeld made use of their option to purchase Wörl for €300,000, prompting Hannover 96 to make use of their option to purchase him back for €500,000.)	
26	MF	(France) Waniss Taïbi	(France) Rodez	Transfer	Summer	30 June 2029	€1,000,000	
27	DF	(Japan) Hayate Matsuda	(Japan) Mito HollyHock	Transfer	Summer	30 June 2028	€200,000	
32	MF	(Germany) Jonas Sterner	(Germany) Holstein Kiel	Transfer	Summer	30 June 2028	€400,000	
33	DF	(Germany) Maurice Neubauer	(Germany) SV Elversberg	Transfer	Summer	30 June 2028	Free	
10	MF	(Germany) Noah Weißhaupt	(Germany) SC Freiburg	Loan	Winter	30 June 2026	Free	
21	MF	(Malawi) Mwisho Mhango	(Malawi) Ascent Soccer Academy	Transfer	Winter	30 June 2030	Free	
23	MF	(Iceland) Stefán Teitur Þórðarson	(England) Preston North End	Transfer	Winter	30 June 2029	€450,000	
24	FW	(Tunisia) Elias Saad	(Germany) FC Augsburg	Loan	Winter	30 June 2026	Free	
35	GK	(Germany) Leon-Oumar Wechsel	(Poland) GKS Tychy	Return from loan	Winter	30 June 2027	–	

==== Out ====
No.	Pos	Player	To	Type	Window	Fee	Source
1	GK	(Germany) Ron-Robert Zieler	(Germany) 1. FC Köln	Transfer	Summer	€200,000	
2	DF	(England) Josh Knight	(England) Portsmouth	Transfer	Summer	€1,000,000	
4	DF	(Germany) Kenneth Schmidt	(Germany) SC Freiburg	End of loan	Summer	–	
5	DF	(Germany) Phil Neumann	(England) Birmingham City	End of contract	Summer	–	
6	MF	(Germany) Fabian Kunze	(Germany) 1. FC Kaiserslautern	End of contract	Summer	–	
7	FW	(Germany) Jessic Ngankam	(Germany) Eintracht Frankfurt	End of loan	Summer	–	
9	FW	(Germany) Nicolò Tresoldi	(Belgium) Club Brugge	Transfer	Summer	€7,500,000	
11	MF	(South Korea) Lee Hyun-ju	(Germany) Bayern Munich II	End of loan	Summer	–	
13	MF	(Germany) Max Christiansen	(Germany) 1860 Munich	End of contract	Summer	–	
17	DF	(Poland) Bartłomiej Wdowik	(Portugal) Braga	End of loan	Summer	–	
19	MF	(Germany) Eric Uhlmann	(Germany) Erzgebirge Aue	End of contract	Summer	–	
20	DF	(Germany) Jannik Dehm	(Germany) Greuther Fürth	End of contract	Summer	–	
21	DF	(Japan) Sei Muroya	(Japan) FC Tokyo	End of contract	Summer	–	
21	MF	(Germany) Marius Wörl	(Germany) Arminia Bielefeld	Transfer	Summer	€1,500,000	
23	DF	(Germany) Marcel Halstenberg	(Germany) Germania Grasdorf	End of contract	Summer	–	
25	MF	(Germany) Lars Gindorf	(Germany) Alemannia Aachen	Loan	Summer	Free	
32	FW	(Germany) Andreas Voglsammer	(Germany) Hansa Rostock	End of contract	Summer	–	
35	GK	(Germany) Leon-Oumar Wechsel	(Poland) GKS Tychy	Loan	Summer	Free	
38	FW	(Germany) Thaddäus-Monju Momuluh	(Germany) Arminia Bielefeld	Transfer	Summer	€400,000	
40	FW	(Wales) Rabbi Matondo	(Scotland) Rangers	End of loan	Summer	–	
10	MF	(Germany) Jannik Rochelt	(Germany) Arminia Bielefeld	Loan	Winter	Free	
32	MF	(Germany) Jonas Sterner	(Germany) Dynamo Dresden	Loan	Winter	Free	
35	GK	(Germany) Leon-Oumar Wechsel	(Germany) Jahn Regensburg	Loan	Winter	Free	

== Friendly matches ==
Win Draw Loss

27 June 2025 Friendly	TSV Pattensen (Germany)	0–3	(Germany) Hannover 96	Pattensen
18:00 CEST (UTC+2)		Report	Gindorf 2'; Momuluh 40'; Tomiak 73' (pen.)	Stadium: Stadion an der Schützenallee; Attendance: 2,000; Referee: Benedikt Junge

28 June 2025 Friendly	HSC Hannover (Germany)	2–4	(Germany) Hannover 96	Hanover
15:30 CEST (UTC+2)	Özün 79'; Kiszka 89'	Report	Pichler 45+2'; Nielsen 63'; Rochelt 65'; Tomiak 76'	Stadium: HSC-Stadion an der Constantinstraße; Attendance: 2,083; Referee: Felix Mutz

5 July 2025 Friendly	Hannover 96 (Germany)	1–2	(Denmark) Randers	Bückeburg
13:00 CEST (UTC+2)	Leopold 41'	Report	Mo. Toure 30'; Mahmoud 113'	Stadium: Jahnstadion; Referee: Robert Schröder
Note: The match lasted for 2×45 and 1×30 minutes.

11 July 2025 Friendly	Hannover 96 (Germany)	2–4	(Belgium) Genk	Harsewinkel
15:30 CEST (UTC+2)	Bundu 6'; Ghiță 9'	Report	Oh 30'; Mujaid 70'; Tolu 95', 102'	Stadium: Hotel-Residence Klosterpforte; Attendance: 0 Referee: Yannick Rupert
Note: The match lasted for 4×35 minutes.

19 July 2025 Friendly	Hannover 96 (Germany)	2–3	(Germany) SC Paderborn	St. Johann in Tirol, Austria
15:00 CEST (UTC+2)	Pichler 6'; Bundu 21'	Report	Grimaldi 40'; Klaas 46'; Copado 53'	Stadium: Koasastadion; Referee: Stefan Gamper

19 July 2025 Friendly	Hannover 96 (Germany)	1–1	(Germany) SC Paderborn	St. Johann in Tirol, Austria
17:00 CEST (UTC+2)	Chakroun 81'	Report	Kinsombi 43'	Stadium: Koasastadion; Referee: Christopher Spiss

25 July 2025 Friendly	Hannover 96 (Germany)	3–0	(Germany) Hansa Rostock	Hanover
15:00 CEST (UTC+2)	Rochelt 28'; Blank 66'; Gindorf 69'	Report		Stadium: Eilenriedestadion; Attendance: 0 Referee: Luca Jürgensen

26 July 2025 Friendly	Hannover 96 (Germany)	2–0	(Italy) Cagliari	Hanover
14:00 CEST (UTC+2)	Tomiak 17' (pen.); Neubauer 86'	Report		Stadium: Heinz von Heiden Arena; Attendance: 11,600; Referee: Lukas Benen

4 September 2025 Friendly	Hamburger SV (Germany)	1–3	(Germany) Hannover 96	Hamburg
13:00 CEST (UTC+2)	Glatzel 73' (pen.)	Report	Taïbi 41'; Rochelt 44'; Oudenne 61'	Stadium: Trainingsplatz am Volksparkstadion; Attendance: 0 Referee: Daniel Piotrowski

8 October 2025 Friendly	Hannover 96 (Germany)	2–1	(Germany) Hallescher FC	Hanover
13:00 CEST (UTC+2)	Nielsen 20'; Bundu 33' (pen.)	Report	Kulke 2'	Stadium: Heinz von Heiden Arena; Attendance: 0 Referee: Lennart Kernchen

5 January 2026 Friendly	Borussia Mönchengladbach (Germany)	0–3	(Germany) Hannover 96	Belek, Turkey
11:30 TRT (UTC+3)		Report	Källman 44'; Nielsen 53'; Pichler 85'	Stadium: Cornelia Sports Center

9 January 2026 Friendly	Hannover 96 (Germany)	2–0	(Germany) MSV Duisburg	Belek, Turkey
12:00 TRT (UTC+3)	Pichler 73'; Oudenne 87'	Report		Stadium: Cornelia Sports Center

9 January 2026 Friendly	Hannover 96 (Germany)	1–0	(Germany) Waldhof Mannheim	Belek, Turkey
15:30 TRT (UTC+3)	Nielsen 14'	Report		Stadium: Cornelia Sports Center

31 January 2026 Friendly	Hannover 96 (Germany)	3–2	(Germany) Kickers Emden	Hanover
11:00 CET (UTC+1)	Nielsen 8'; Kokolo 17'; Okon 50'	Report	Mengot 12'; Schmidt 78'	Stadium: Eilenriedestadion; Attendance: 0 Referee: Alexander Roj

25 March 2026 Friendly	Hannover 96 (Germany)	2–0	(Germany) VfL Osnabrück	Hanover
12:00 CET (UTC+1)	Weißhaupt 64'; Oudenne 88' (pen.)	Report		Stadium: Eilenriedestadion; Attendance: 0 Referee: Jarno Wienefeld

== Competitions ==
Win Draw Loss

=== Overview ===
Competition	First match	Last match	Starting round	Final position	Record							
Competition	First match	Last match	Starting round	Final position	Pld	W	D	L	GF	GA	GD	Win %
2. Bundesliga	3 August 2025	17 May 2025	Matchday 1	4th	34	16	12	6	60	44	+16	47.06
DFB-Pokal	16 August 2025	16 August 2025	First round	First round	1	0	0	1	0	1	−1	0.00
Total					35	16	12	7	60	45	+15	45.71

Source: Competitions

=== 2. Bundesliga ===
==== League table ====
Pos	Team	Pld	W	D	L	GF	GA	GD	Pts	Promotion, qualification or relegation
2	SV Elversberg (P)	34	18	8	8	64	39	+25	62	Promotion to Bundesliga
3	SC Paderborn (O, P)	34	18	8	8	59	45	+14	62	Qualification for promotion play-offs
4	Hannover 96	34	16	12	6	60	44	+16	60	
5	Darmstadt 98	34	13	13	8	57	45	+12	52	
6	1. FC Kaiserslautern	34	16	4	14	52	47	+5	52	

Source: Bundesliga
Rules for classification: 1) Points; 2) Goal difference; 3) Goals scored; 4) Head-to-head results; 5) Head-to-head away goals scored; 6) Away goals scored; 7) Play-off.
(Rules 4–6 only apply after home and away matches have been played between the tied teams.)
(O) Play-off winners; (P) Promoted

==== Results summary ====
Overall								Home						Away					
Pld	W	D	L	GF	GA	GD	Pts	W	D	L	GF	GA	GD	W	D	L	GF	GA	GD
34	16	12	6	60	44	+16	60	7	6	4	27	23	+4	9	6	2	33	21	+12

Source: DFB

==== Results by round ====
Round	1	2	3	4	5	6	7	8	9	10	11	12	13	14	15	16	17	18	19	20	21	22	23	24	25	26	27	28	29	30	31	32	33	34
Ground	H	A	H	A	H	A	H	A	H	A	A	H	A	H	A	H	A	A	H	A	H	A	H	A	H	A	H	H	A	H	A	H	A	H
Result	W	W	W	W	L	D	W	D	L	W	D	L	W	W	D	D	L	L	W	W	W	W	D	W	L	D	W	D	W	D	W	D	D	D
Position	7	3	1	1	1	3	3	5	6	4	4	5	5	4	5	5	5	6	5	5	5	4	5	5	5	5	5	5	3	4	3	3	3	4

Source: DFB
A = Away; H = Home; W = Win; D = Draw; L = Loss

==== Matches ====
3 August 2025 1	Hannover 96	1–0	1. FC Kaiserslautern	Hanover
13:30 CEST (UTC+2)	Aséko 74'	Report		Stadium: Heinz von Heiden Arena; Attendance: 49,000; Referee: Michael Bacher

9 August 2025 2	Fortuna Düsseldorf	0–2	Hannover 96	Düsseldorf
13:00 CEST (UTC+2)		Report	Tomiak 65' (pen.); Källman 87'	Stadium: Merkur Spiel-Arena; Attendance: 37,590; Referee: Wolfgang Haslberger

23 August 2025 3	Hannover 96	3–1	1. FC Magdeburg	Hanover
13:00 CEST (UTC+2)	Matsuda 17'; Okon 43'; Källman 90+3'	Report	Kaars 63'	Stadium: Heinz von Heiden Arena; Attendance: 40,200; Referee: Richard Hempel

30 August 2025 4	Holstein Kiel	1–2	Hannover 96	Kiel
13:00 CEST (UTC+2)	Harres 21'	Report	Ghiță 62'; Källman 69'	Stadium: Holstein-Stadion; Attendance: 14,757; Referee: Timo Gansloweit

13 September 2025 5	Hannover 96	0–3	Hertha BSC	Hanover
20:30 CEST (UTC+2)		Report	Winkler 51'; Kownacki 68'; Schuler 90+2'	Stadium: Heinz von Heiden Arena; Attendance: 49,000; Referee: Sascha Stegemann

21 September 2025 6	Dynamo Dresden	2–2	Hannover 96	Dresden
13:30 CEST (UTC+2)	Ghiță 35' (o.g.); Fröling 41'	Report	Pichler 11' (pen.); Aséko 43'	Stadium: Rudolf-Harbig-Stadion; Attendance: 31,733; Referee: Max Burda

28 September 2025 7	Hannover 96	3–1	Arminia Bielefeld	Hanover
13:30 CEST (UTC+2)	Chakroun 53'; Matsuda 55'; Tomiak 90+1' (pen.)	Report	Felix 35'	Stadium: Heinz von Heiden Arena; Attendance: 49,000; Referee: Tobias Stieler

5 October 2025 8	Greuther Fürth	2–2	Hannover 96	Fürth
13:30 CEST (UTC+2)	Futkeu 24'; Abrangao 82'	Report	Källman 6'; Matsuda 61'	Stadium: Sportpark Ronhof Thomas Sommer; Attendance: 11,990; Referee: Jarno Wienefeld

17 October 2025 9	Hannover 96	0–3	Schalke 04	Hanover
18:30 CEST (UTC+2)		Report	Sylla 3', 14'; Gomis 85'	Stadium: Heinz von Heiden Arena; Attendance: 49,000; Referee: Martin Petersen

26 October 2025 10	Eintracht Braunschweig	0–3	Hannover 96	Braunschweig
13:30 CET (UTC+1)		Report	Källman 32', 36'; Yokota 61'	Stadium: Eintracht-Stadion; Attendance: 22,098; Referee: Robert Hartmann

31 October 2025 11	SV Elversberg	2–2	Hannover 96	Spiesen-Elversberg
18:30 CET (UTC+1)	Petkov 22'; Conté 80'	Report	Le Joncour 43' (o.g.); Ghiță 85'	Stadium: Waldstadion an der Kaiserlinde; Attendance: 9,307; Referee: Timo Gerach

8 November 2025 12	Hannover 96	2–3	Darmstadt 98	Hanover
13:00 CET (UTC+1)	Okon 18'; Oudenne 33'	Report	Corredor 5', 50'; Akiyama 90+4'	Stadium: Heinz von Heiden Arena; Attendance: 40,100; Referee: Wolfgang Haslberger

22 November 2025 13	SC Paderborn	0–2	Hannover 96	Paderborn
13:00 CET (UTC+1)		Report	Källman 20', 36'	Stadium: Home Deluxe Arena; Attendance: 15,000; Referee: Daniel Schlager

28 November 2025 14	Hannover 96	3–0	Karlsruher SC	Hanover
18:30 CET (UTC+1)	Chakroun 68'; Pichler 70'; Bundu 77'	Report		Stadium: Heinz von Heiden Arena; Attendance: 38,200; Referee: Patrick Alt

5 December 2025 15	Preußen Münster	2–2	Hannover 96	Münster
18:30 CET (UTC+1)	Batista Meier 90+1' (pen.); Sertdemir 90+6'	Report	Källman 41'; Yokota 73'	Stadium: LVM-Preußenstadion; Attendance: 10,600; Referee: Michael Bacher

13 December 2025 16	Hannover 96	0–0	VfL Bochum	Hanover
20:30 CET (UTC+1)		Report		Stadium: Heinz von Heiden Arena; Attendance: 42,300; Referee: Tobias Reichel

21 December 2025 17	1. FC Nürnberg	2–1	Hannover 96	Nuremberg
13:30 CET (UTC+1)	Lubach 44'; Zoma 49'	Report	Källman 19'	Stadium: Max-Morlock-Stadion; Attendance: 34,022; Referee: Max Burda

18 January 2026 18	1. FC Kaiserslautern	3–1	Hannover 96	Kaiserslautern
13:30 CET (UTC+1)	Prtajin 74'; Şahin 90+2'; Skyttä 90+5'	Report	Leopold 67'	Stadium: Fritz-Walter-Stadion; Attendance: 44,382; Referee: Matthias Jöllenbeck

24 January 2026 19	Hannover 96	2–1	Fortuna Düsseldorf	Hanover
13:00 CET (UTC+1)	Yokota 4'; Källman 47'	Report	Egouli 49'	Stadium: Heinz von Heiden Arena; Attendance: 35,100; Referee: Patrick Ittrich

30 January 2026 20	1. FC Magdeburg	1–2	Hannover 96	Magdeburg
18:30 CET (UTC+1)	Atik 53'	Report	Yokota 38'; Leopold 56'	Stadium: Avnet Arena; Attendance: 25,790; Referee: Timo Gansloweit

8 February 2026 21	Hannover 96	3–1	Holstein Kiel	Hanover
13:30 CET (UTC+1)	Källman 5'; Aséko 21'; Þórðarson 78'	Report	Harres 68'	Stadium: Heinz von Heiden Arena; Attendance: 32,400; Referee: Konrad Oldhafer

14 February 2026 22	Hertha BSC	2–3	Hannover 96	Berlin
13:00 CET (UTC+1)	Reese 53' (pen.); Eitschberger 90+2'	Report	Tomiak 8'; Källman 29'; Weißhaupt 71'	Stadium: Olympiastadion; Attendance: 41,788; Referee: Lars Erbst

22 February 2026 23	Hannover 96	0–0	Dynamo Dresden	Hanover
13:30 CET (UTC+1)		Report		Stadium: Heinz von Heiden Arena; Attendance: 40,300; Referee: Martin Petersen

28 February 2026 24	Arminia Bielefeld	0–1	Hannover 96	Bielefeld
13:00 CET (UTC+1)		Report	Leopold 63' (pen.)	Stadium: SchücoArena; Attendance: 26,750; Referee: Eric Weisbach

8 March 2026 25	Hannover 96	1–2	Greuther Fürth	Hanover
13:30 CET (UTC+1)	Neubauer 50'	Report	Futkeu 33'; Dehm 57'	Stadium: Heinz von Heiden Arena; Attendance: 35,600; Referee: Tom Bauer

15 March 2026 26	Schalke 04	2–2	Hannover 96	Gelsenkirchen
13:30 CET (UTC+1)	Džeko 29'; Karaman 38'	Report	Nawrocki 82'; Pichler 90+8'	Stadium: Veltins-Arena; Attendance: 62,077; Referee: Robin Braun

20 March 2026 27	Hannover 96	1–0	Eintracht Braunschweig	Hanover
18:30 CET (UTC+1)	Nawrocki 30'	Report		Stadium: Heinz von Heiden Arena; Attendance: 42,000; Referee: Florian Exner

5 April 2026 28	Hannover 96	1–1	SV Elversberg	Hanover
13:30 CEST (UTC+2)	Rohr 20' (o.g.)	Report	Petkov 56' (pen.)	Stadium: Heinz von Heiden Arena; Attendance: 38,300; Referee: Robert Kampka

11 April 2026 29	Darmstadt 98	0–2	Hannover 96	Darmstadt
20:30 CEST (UTC+2)		Report	Neubauer 14'; Þórðarson 56'	Stadium: Merck-Stadion am Böllenfalltor; Attendance: 17,810; Referee: Florian Badstübner

18 April 2026 30	Hannover 96	1–1	SC Paderborn	Hanover
20:30 CEST (UTC+2)	Källman 78'	Report	Götze 40'	Stadium: Heinz von Heiden Arena; Attendance: 49,000; Referee: Max Burda

25 April 2026 31	Karlsruher SC	1–3	Hannover 96	Karlsruhe
13:00 CEST (UTC+2)	Schleusener 44'	Report	Bundu 18'; Oudenne 82'; Yokota 90+10' (pen.)	Stadium: BBBank Wildpark; Attendance: 30,255; Referee: Konrad Oldhafer

3 May 2026 32	Hannover 96	3–3	Preußen Münster	Hanover
13:30 CEST (UTC+2)	Bundu 45+1', 45+4'; Þórðarson 85'	Report	Rondić 25'; Yamada 39'; Hendrix 90+3'	Stadium: Heinz von Heiden Arena; Attendance: 49,000; Referee: Florian Lechner

9 May 2026 33	VfL Bochum	1–1	Hannover 96	Bochum
13:00 CEST (UTC+2)	Alfa-Ruprecht 55'	Report	Nawrocki 50'	Stadium: Vonovia Ruhrstadion; Attendance: 26,000; Referee: Robert Kampka

17 May 2026 34	Hannover 96	3–3	1. FC Nürnberg	Hanover
15:30 CEST (UTC+2)	Oudenne 30'; Taïbi 45'; Lochoshvili 51' (o.g.)	Report	Zoma 25', 47'; Lochoshvili 83'	Stadium: Heinz von Heiden Arena; Attendance: 49,000; Referee: Daniel Schlager

=== DFB-Pokal ===
16 August 2025 First round	Energie Cottbus	1–0	Hannover 96	Cottbus
18:00 CEST (UTC+2)	Ciğerci 12'	Report		Stadium: LEAG Energie Stadion; Attendance: 18,659; Referee: Felix Prigan

== Statistics ==
=== Appearances and goals ===
No.	Pos	Player	2. Bundesliga		DFB-Pokal		Total	
No.	Pos	Player	Apps	Goals	Apps	Goals	Apps	Goals
1	GK	(Germany) Nahuel Noll	34	0	1	0	35	0
2	DF	(England) Josh Knight	0	0	0	0	0	0
3	DF	(Germany) Boris Tomiak	25	3	1	0	26	3
4	DF	(Germany) Hendry Blank	2+10	0	0	0	12	0
5	DF	(Romania) Virgil Ghiță	25+4	2	1	0	30	2
6	DF	(Poland) Maik Nawrocki	16+1	3	0	0	17	3
7	FW	(Sierra Leone) Mustapha Bundu	16+6	4	0	0	22	4
8	MF	(Germany) Enzo Leopold	34	3	1	0	35	3
9	FW	(Finland) Benjamin Källman	23+10	14	0+1	0	34	14
10	MF	(Germany) Jannik Rochelt	7+6	0	1	0	14	0
10	MF	(Germany) Noah Weißhaupt	1+5	1	0	0	6	1
11	FW	(Austria) Benedikt Pichler	10+9	3	1	0	20	3
13	MF	(Germany) Franz Roggow	0+7	0	0	0	7	0
14	FW	(Lebanon) Husseyn Chakroun	9+12	2	1	0	22	2
15	MF	(Germany) Noël Aséko Nkili	30+2	3	1	0	33	3
16	FW	(Norway) Håvard Nielsen	0+10	0	0	0	10	0
17	DF	(Germany) Bastian Allgeier	12+5	0	0	0	17	0
18	MF	(Japan) Daisuke Yokota	19+11	5	0+1	0	31	5
19	DF	(France) William Kokolo	2+11	0	0	0	13	0
20	DF	(South Africa) Ime Okon	19+6	2	1	0	26	2
21	MF	(Germany) Marius Wörl	0	0	0	0	0	0
21	MF	(Malawi) Mwisho Mhango	0	0	0	0	0	0
22	MF	(Germany) Noah Engelbreth	0	0	0	0	0	0
23	MF	(Iceland) Stefán Teitur Þórðarson	9+7	3	0	0	16	3
24	FW	(Tunisia) Elias Saad	8+5	0	0	0	13	0
25	MF	(Germany) Lars Gindorf	0	0	0	0	0	0
26	MF	(France) Waniss Taïbi	10+16	1	0	0	26	1
27	DF	(Japan) Hayate Matsuda	16+9	3	1	0	26	3
29	MF	(Sweden) Kolja Oudenne	18+9	3	0+1	0	28	3
30	GK	(Germany) Leo Weinkauf	0	0	0	0	0	0
32	MF	(Germany) Jonas Sterner	0+1	0	0	0	1	0
33	DF	(Germany) Maurice Neubauer	29+2	2	1	0	32	2
34	FW	(Germany) Denis Husser	0	0	0	0	0	0
37	DF	(Germany) Brooklyn Ezeh	0	0	0	0	0	0
38	FW	(Germany) Thaddäus-Monju Momuluh	0	0	0	0	0	0
39	FW	(Turkey) Taycan Kurt	0	0	0	0	0	0
40	GK	(Germany) Jonas Schwanke	0	0	0	0	0	0

=== Goalscorers ===
Rank	No.	Pos	Name	2. Bundesliga	DFB-Pokal	Total
1	9	FW	(Finland) Benjamin Källman	14	0	14
2	18	MF	(Japan) Daisuke Yokota	5	0	5
3	7	FW	(Sierra Leone) Mustapha Bundu	4	0	4
4	3	DF	(Germany) Boris Tomiak	3	0	3
4	6	DF	(Poland) Maik Nawrocki	3	0	3
4	8	MF	(Germany) Enzo Leopold	3	0	3
4	11	FW	(Austria) Benedikt Pichler	3	0	3
4	15	MF	(Germany) Noël Aséko Nkili	3	0	3
4	23	MF	(Iceland) Stefán Teitur Þórðarson	3	0	3
4	27	DF	(Japan) Hayate Matsuda	3	0	3
4	29	MF	(Sweden) Kolja Oudenne	3	0	3
12	5	DF	(Romania) Virgil Ghiță	2	0	2
12	14	FW	(Lebanon) Husseyn Chakroun	2	0	2
12	20	DF	(South Africa) Ime Okon	2	0	2
12	33	DF	(Germany) Maurice Neubauer	2	0	2
16	10	MF	(Germany) Noah Weißhaupt	1	0	1
16	26	MF	(France) Waniss Taïbi	1	0	1
Own goals				3	0	3
Total				60	0	60

=== Clean sheets ===
Rank	No.	Pos	Name	2. Bundesliga	DFB-Pokal	Total
1	1	GK	(Germany) Nahuel Noll	10	0	10
Total				10	0	10

=== Disciplinary record ===
Rank	No.	Pos	Name	2. Bundesliga			DFB-Pokal			Total		
Rank	No.	Pos	Name	Booked	(yellow card) (yellow-red card)	Sent off (straight red)	Booked	(yellow card) (yellow-red card)	Sent off (straight red)	Booked	(yellow card) (yellow-red card)	Sent off (straight red)
1	3	DF	(Germany) Boris Tomiak	8	0	0	1	0	0	9	0	0
2	15	MF	(Germany) Noël Aséko Nkili	7	0	0	1	0	0	8	0	0
3	5	DF	(Romania) Virgil Ghiță	6	0	0	0	0	0	6	0	0
3	18	MF	(Japan) Daisuke Yokota	6	0	0	0	0	0	6	0	0
5	20	DF	(South Africa) Ime Okon	4	0	0	1	0	0	5	0	0
5	26	MF	(France) Waniss Taïbi	2	1	0	0	0	0	2	1	0
7	6	DF	(Poland) Maik Nawrocki	4	0	0	0	0	0	4	0	0
7	7	FW	(Sierra Leone) Mustapha Bundu	4	0	0	0	0	0	4	0	0
7	8	MF	(Germany) Enzo Leopold	4	0	0	0	0	0	4	0	0
7	27	DF	(Japan) Hayate Matsuda	4	0	0	0	0	0	4	0	0
7	33	DF	(Germany) Maurice Neubauer	4	0	0	0	0	0	4	0	0
12	23	MF	(Iceland) Stefán Teitur Þórðarson	3	0	0	0	0	0	3	0	0
13	1	GK	(Germany) Nahuel Noll	2	0	0	0	0	0	2	0	0
13	14	FW	(Lebanon) Husseyn Chakroun	2	0	0	0	0	0	2	0	0
13	29	MF	(Sweden) Kolja Oudenne	2	0	0	0	0	0	2	0	0
16	9	FW	(Finland) Benjamin Källman	1	0	0	0	0	0	1	0	0
16	10	MF	(Germany) Noah Weißhaupt	1	0	0	0	0	0	1	0	0
16	13	MF	(Germany) Franz Roggow	1	0	0	0	0	0	1	0	0
16	17	DF	(Germany) Bastian Allgeier	1	0	0	0	0	0	1	0	0
16	19	DF	(France) William Kokolo	1	0	0	0	0	0	1	0	0
16	24	FW	(Tunisia) Elias Saad	1	0	0	0	0	0	1	0	0
Total				68	1	0	3	0	0	71	1	0
