= Ime Okon =

South African soccer player (born 2004)

Personal information
- Full name: Ime Daniel Okon
- Date of birth: 20 February 2004 (age 22)
- Place of birth: South Africa
- Height: 1.87 m (6 ft 2 in)
- Position: Defender

Team information
- Current team: Hannover 96
- Number: 20

Senior career*
| Years | Team | Apps | (Gls) |
| 2023–2025 | SuperSport United | 43 | (1) |
| 2025– | Hannover 96 | 25 | (2) |

International career^{‡}
| 2025 | South Africa B | 5 | (1) |
| 2026– | South Africa | 9 | (1) |
- * Club domestic league appearances and goals as of 18 May 2026 ‡ National team caps and goals as of 26 September 2026

Ime Daniel Okon (born 20 February 2004) is a South African professional soccer player who plays as a defender for Hannover 96 and the South Africa national team.

== Early life ==
Okon was born in 2004 in South Africa to a Nigerian father and a South African mother. He attended Florida Park High School in South Africa.

== Club career ==
Okon started his career with the South African Premiership club SuperSport United. He joined 2. Bundesliga side Hannover 96 ahead of the 2025–26 season on a four-year contract.

== International career ==
Okon made his debut for the South Africa national B team on 4 June 2025 in the opening match of the 2025 COSAFA Cup against Mozambique. He scored his first goal three days later in the second tournament match against Zimbabwe.

Okon represented South Africa at the 2026 FIFA World Cup.

== Personal life ==
Okon is a native of Florida, South Africa. He was born to a Nigerian father and South African mother. He is the brother of South African sprinter Udeme Okon.

== Career statistics ==
=== Club ===
As of match played 17 May 2026

| Club | Season | League | | | National cup (Note: Includes Nedbank Cup, DFB-Pokal) | | League cup (Note: Includes Carling Knockout Cup) | | Continental | | Other | | Total | |
| Club | Season | Division | Apps | Goals | Apps | Goals | Apps | Goals | Apps | Goals | Apps | Goals | Apps | Goals |
|---|---|---|---|---|---|---|---|---|---|---|---|---|---|---|
| SuperSport United | 2023–24 | Premiership | 23 | 1 | 2 | 0 | 0 | 0 | 4 (Note: Appearances in CAF Confederation Cup) | 0 | 1 (Note: Appearances in MTN 8) | 0 | 30 | 1 |
| SuperSport United | 2024–25 | Premiership | 20 | 0 | 2 | 1 | 1 | 0 | — | | 0 | 0 | 23 | 1 |
| SuperSport United | Total | | 43 | 1 | 4 | 1 | 1 | 0 | 4 | 0 | 1 | 0 | 53 | 2 |
| Hannover 96 | 2025–26 | 2. Bundesliga | 25 | 2 | 1 | 0 | — | | — | | — | | 26 | 2 |
| Hannover 96 | 2026–27 | 2. Bundesliga | 0 | 0 | 0 | 0 | — | | — | | — | | 0 | 0 |
| Hannover 96 | Total | | 25 | 2 | 1 | 0 | 0 | 0 | 0 | 0 | 0 | 0 | 26 | 2 |
| Career total | | | 68 | 3 | 5 | 1 | 1 | 0 | 4 | 0 | 1 | 0 | 79 | 4 |

=== International ===
As of match played 30 September 2026

Appearances and goals by national team and year
| National team | Year | Apps | Goals |
|---|---|---|---|
| South Africa B | 2025 | 5 | 1 |
| South Africa | 2026 | 9 | 1 |
| Total | | 14 | 2 |

=== International goals ===
Scores and results list South Africa's goal tally first.

| No. | Date | Venue | Opponent | Score | Result | Competition |
|---|---|---|---|---|---|---|
| 1. | 7 June 2025 | Dr. Petrus Molemela Stadium, Bloemfontein, South Africa | Zimbabwe | 2–0 | 2–0 | 2025 COSAFA Cup |
| 2. | 26 September 2026 | Orlando Stadium, Johannesburg, South Africa | Guinea | 1–0 | 2–1 | 2027 Africa Cup of Nations qualification |
