= Virgil Ghiță =

Romanian footballer

Personal information
- Full name: Virgil Eugen Ghiță
- Date of birth: 4 June 1998 (age 28)
- Place of birth: Pitești, Romania
- Height: 1.86 m (6 ft 1 in)
- Position: Centre-back

Team information
- Current team: Hannover 96
- Number: 5

Youth career
- 2003–2010: LPS Pitești
- 2010–2011: Argeș Pitești
- 2011–2017: Gheorghe Hagi Academy

Senior career*
Years	Team	Apps	(Gls)
2017–2021	Viitorul Constanța	69	(6)
2021–2022	Farul Constanța	24	(2)
2022–2025	Cracovia	103	(10)
2025–	Hannover 96	39	(2)

International career^{‡}
2014–2015	Romania U17	6	(1)
2016	Romania U18	1	(0)
2016	Romania U19	2	(0)
2017–2020	Romania U21	10	(1)
2021	Romania Olympic	5	(0)
2021–	Romania	12	(1)
- * Club domestic league appearances and goals as of 22 November 2026 ‡ National team caps and goals as of 2 October 2026

Virgil Eugen Ghiță (born 4 June 1998) is a Romanian professional footballer who plays as a central defender for 2. Bundesliga club Hannover 96 and the Romania national team.

== International career ==
He made his debut for the Romania national football team on 5 September 2021 in a World Cup qualifier against Liechtenstein, a 2–0 home victory. He substituted Ionuț Nedelcearu in the 79th minute. On 12 October 2025, he scored his first goal for the national team, a last-minute header to win a potentially decisive World Cup qualifier game against Austria 1-0.

== Career statistics ==
=== Club ===
As of 22 November 2026

Appearances and goals by club, season and competition
Club	Season	League			National cup (Note: Includes Cupa României, Polish Cup)		Europe		Other		Total	
Club	Season	Division	Apps	Goals	Apps	Goals	Apps	Goals	Apps	Goals	Apps	Goals
Viitorul Constanța	2017–18	Liga I	8	1	2	0	0	0	—		10	1
Viitorul Constanța	2018–19	Liga I	20	1	6	2	0	0	—		26	3
Viitorul Constanța	2019–20	Liga I	27	4	0	0	2 (Note: Appearances in UEFA Europa League)	0	0	0	29	4
Viitorul Constanța	2020–21	Liga I	14	0	0	0	—		0	0	14	0
Viitorul Constanța	Total		69	6	8	2	2	0	0	0	79	8
Farul Constanța	2021–22	Liga I	24	2	1	0	—		—		25	2
Cracovia	2021–22	Ekstraklasa	10	0	—		—		—		10	0
Cracovia	2022–23	Ekstraklasa	34	3	2	1	—		—		36	4
Cracovia	2023–24	Ekstraklasa	29	4	2	0	—		—		31	4
Cracovia	2024–25	Ekstraklasa	30	3	1	1	—		—		31	4
Cracovia	Total		103	10	5	2	—		—		108	12
Hannover 96	2025–26	2. Bundesliga	29	2	1	0	—		—		30	2
Hannover 96	2026–27	2. Bundesliga	10	0	0	0	—		—		10	0
Hannover 96	Total		39	2	1	0	—		—		40	2
Career total			235	20	15	4	2	0	0	0	252	24

=== International ===
As of match played 2 October 2026

Appearances and goals by national team and year
National team	Year	Apps	Goals
Romania
Romania	2021	1	0
Romania	2022	0	0
Romania	2023	0	0
Romania	2024	1	0
Romania	2025	6	1
Romania	2026	4	0
Total		12	1

Scores and results list Uruguay's goal tally first, score column indicates score after each Ghiță goal.

List of international goals scored by Virgil Ghiță
No.	Date	Venue	Opponent	Score	Result	Competition
1	12 October 2025	Arena Națională, Bucharest, Romania	Austria	1–0	1–0	2026 FIFA World Cup qualification

== Honours ==
Viitorul Constanța

- Cupa României: 2018–19
- Supercupa României: 2019
