= Jean Hugonet =

French footballer (born 1999)

Personal information
- Date of birth: 24 November 1999 (age 26)
- Place of birth: Paris, France
- Height: 1.86 m (6 ft 1 in)
- Position: Centre-back

Team information
- Current team: Hannover 96
- Number: 4

Youth career
- –2019: Paris FC

Senior career*
Years	Team	Apps	(Gls)
2018–2020	Paris FC B	33	(1)
2019–2020	Paris FC	0	(0)
2020–2021	Saint-Malo	1	(0)
2021–2023	Austria Lustenau	58	(2)
2023–2026	1. FC Magdeburg	70	(6)
2026–	Hannover 96	0	(0)
- * Club domestic league appearances and goals as of 1 July 2026

Jean Hugonet (born 24 November 1999) is a French professional footballer who plays as a centre-back for 2. Bundesliga side Hannover 96.

== Career statistics ==
As of 1 July 2026

Appearances and goals by club, season and competition
Club	Season	League			National cup		League cup		Other		Total	
Club	Season	Division	Apps	Goals	Apps	Goals	Apps	Goals	Apps	Goals	Apps	Goals
Paris FC B	2018–19	Championnat National 3	20	1	–		–		–		20	1
Paris FC B	2019–20	Championnat National 3	13	0	–		–		–		13	0
Paris FC B	Total		33	1	0	0	0	0	0	0	33	1
Paris FC	2019–20	Ligue 2	0	0	1 (Note: Appearances in the Coupe de France)	0	0	0	–		1	0
Saint-Malo	2020–21	Championnat National 2	1	0	2	0	–		–		3	0
Austria Lustenau	2021–22	2. Liga	29	1	2 (Note: Appearances in the Austrian Cup)	0	–		0	0	31	1
Austria Lustenau	2022–23	2. Liga	29	1	2	0	–		3 (Note: Appearances in 2. Liga play-offs)	0	34	1
Austria Lustenau	Total		58	2	4	0	0	0	3	0	65	2
1. FC Magdeburg	2023–24	2. Bundesliga	14	1	1 (Note: Appearances in the DFB-Pokal)	1	–		–		15	2
1. FC Magdeburg	2024–25	2. Bundesliga	32	3	1	0	–		–		33	3
1. FC Magdeburg	2025–26	2. Bundesliga	24	2	1	0	–		–		25	2
1. FC Magdeburg	Total		70	6	3	1	0	0	0	0	73	7
Hannover 96	2026–27	2. Bundesliga	0	0	0	0	–		–		0	0
Career total			162	9	10	1	0	0	3	0	175	10
