= Nahuel Noll =

German footballer (born 2003)

Personal information
- Full name: Nahuel Nicolas Noll
- Date of birth: 17 March 2003 (age 23)
- Place of birth: Munich, Germany
- Height: 1.90 m (6 ft 3 in)
- Position: Goalkeeper

Team information
- Current team: SC Paderborn (on loan from TSG Hoffenheim)
- Number: 15

Youth career
- 2009–2013: Atlètic Sant Just
- 2013–2014: FT München-Gern
- 2014–2019: 1860 Munich
- 2019–2024: TSG Hoffenheim

Senior career*
Years	Team	Apps	(Gls)
2021–2024	TSG Hoffenheim II	64	(1)
2024–	TSG Hoffenheim	0	(0)
2024–2025	→ Greuther Fürth (loan)	29	(0)
2025–2026	→ Hannover 96 (loan)	34	(0)
2026–	→ SC Paderborn (loan)	8	(0)

International career^{‡}
2021	Germany U19	1	(0)
2022–2024	Germany U20	7	(0)
Medal record
Men's football
Representing Germany
UEFA European Under-21 Championship
Runner-up	2025 Slovakia
- * Club domestic league appearances and goals as of 23:39, 31 October 2026 (UTC) ‡ National team caps and goals as of 14:09, 4 June 2025 (UTC)

Nahuel Nicolas Noll (born 17 March 2003) is a German professional footballer who plays as a goalkeeper for Bundesliga club SC Paderborn, on loan from TSG Hoffenheim.

== Club career ==
Born in Munich, Noll moved to Barcelona, Spain at the age of 5 where he played with the Atlètic Sant Just youth team. At the age of 10, he moved to Germany and played with the youth academies of FT München-Gern, 1860 Munich and TSG Hoffenheim. On 15 July 2021, Noll signed his first professional contract with Hoffenheim until 2025 and was promoted to their reserves in the Regionalliga. He scored a 90-meter goal in a 3–0 Regionalliga win against Barockstadt Fulda-Lehnerz on 15 April 2023. On 2 February 2024, Noll extended his contract with TSG Hoffenheim until 2027.

On 24 April 2024, Noll signed on loan with Greuther Fürth for the 2024–25 season. He made his senior and professional debut with Greuther Fürth in a 3–0 2. Bundesliga win over Preußen Münster on 4 August 2024.

Noll was loaned out to Hannover 96 for the 2025–26 season, and SC Paderborn for the 2026–27 season.

== International career ==
Noll was called up to the Germany U21s for the 2025 UEFA European Under-21 Championship.

== Personal life ==
Noll was born in Germany to a German father and Spanish mother. His paternal grandfather, Helmut Noll, was a rower who won silver at the 1952 Summer Olympics in coxed pair.

== Career statistics ==
=== Club ===
As of match played 31 October 2026

Appearances and goals by club, season and competition
Club	Season	League			National cup		Europe		Total	
Club	Season	Division	Apps	Goals	Apps	Goals	Apps	Goals	Apps	Goals
TSG Hoffenheim II	2021–22	Regionalliga Südwest	12	0	—		—		12	0
TSG Hoffenheim II	2022–23	Regionalliga Südwest	27	1	—		—		27	1
TSG Hoffenheim II	2023–24	Regionalliga Südwest	25	0	—		—		25	0
TSG Hoffenheim II	Total		64	1	—		—		64	1
TSG Hoffenheim	2020–21	Bundesliga	0	0	0	0	0	0	0	0
TSG Hoffenheim	2022–23	Bundesliga	0	0	0	0	—		0	0
TSG Hoffenheim	2023–24	Bundesliga	0	0	0	0	—		0	0
TSG Hoffenheim	Total		0	0	0	0	0	0	0	0
Greuther Fürth (loan)	2024–25	2. Bundesliga	29	0	2	0	—		31	0
Hannover 96 (loan)	2025–26	2. Bundesliga	34	0	1	0	—		35	0
SC Paderborn (loan)	2026–27	Bundesliga	8	0	0	0	—		8	0
Career total			135	1	3	0	0	0	138	1

== Honours ==
Germany U21

- UEFA European Under-21 Championship runner-up: 2025
