= Noël Aséko Nkili =

German footballer (born 2005)

Personal information
- Full name: Noël Aséko Nkili
- Date of birth: 22 November 2005 (age 20)
- Place of birth: Berlin, Germany
- Height: 1.78 m (5 ft 10 in)
- Position: Midfielder

Team information
- Current team: Eintracht Frankfurt
- Number: 15

Youth career
- 2016–2017: Hertha Zehlendorf
- 2017–2022: Hertha BSC
- 2022–2024: Bayern Munich

Senior career*
Years	Team	Apps	(Gls)
2022–2025	Bayern Munich II	30	(2)
2023–2026	Bayern Munich	0	(0)
2025	→ Hannover 96 II (loan)	10	(0)
2025–2026	→ Hannover 96 (loan)	33	(3)
2026–	Eintracht Frankfurt	6	(0)

International career^{‡}
2021–2022	Germany U17	11	(0)
2022–2023	Germany U18	5	(0)
2024	Germany U20	2	(0)
2025–	Germany U21	9	(0)
- * Club domestic league appearances and goals as of 1 November 2026 ‡ National team caps and goals as of 20:35, 17 November 2026 (UTC)

Noël Aséko Nkili (born 22 November 2005) is a German professional footballer who plays as a midfielder for Bundesliga club Eintracht Frankfurt. He is a German youth international.

== Club career ==
=== Early career ===
Aséko is a product of the youth academies of Hertha Zehlendorf and Hertha BSC. On 13 July 2022, he transferred to the Bayern Munich youth academy. He debuted professionally with Bayern Munich II during a 3–0 win Regionalliga match against TSV Rain am Lech on 24 September 2022.

=== Bayern Munich ===
He was absent for the initial half of the 2023–24 season owing to an ankle injury. In December 2023, he was called-up with the senior Bayern Munich squad, featuring on the bench and as an unused substitute for a Bundesliga match against VfB Stuttgart on 17 December 2023.

On 6 January 2024, Aséko made his debut for the senior team after getting subbed on for Raphaël Guerreiro at the 67th minute of a 1–1 draw friendly match against Swiss Super League club Basel, in which he also scored his first goal for Bayern Munich at the 70th minute with his first ball contact of the game. Later that year, in April, he sustained a knee injury, requiring surgery on his meniscus. On 15 May, he signed his first professional contract with Bayern Munich until 2026.

==== Loan to Hannover 96 and return to Bayern ====
On 3 February 2025, it was announced that Aséko would be loaned out to 2. Bundesliga club Hannover 96 until the end of the 2025–26 season, having previously extended his contract with Bayern Munich until 2028. He made his debut for the club on 18 May 2025, coming on to replace Fabian Kunze during a 1–1 away draw in a 2. Bundesliga match against Hertha BSC.

On 19 March 2026, Aséko was confirmed to be returning to his parent club Bayern Munich after the end of the 2025–26 season. Hannover 96 signed him permanently for the 2026–27 season, but Bayern Munich exercised their buy‑back option included in his deal.

During the late second half of the 2025–26 season, months before his return with Bayern Munich, he was reached by head coach Vincent Kompany, as many clubs started to show interest in recruiting Aséko ahead of the upcoming 2026–27 season, including fellow Bundesliga club Eintracht Frankfurt, Italian club Roma, Spanish club Villarreal, and English clubs Aston Villa and Brighton, among others.

=== Eintracht Frankfurt ===
On 18 July 2026, he transferred to fellow Bundesliga club Eintracht Frankfurt and signed a contract until 2031 ahead of the 2026–27 season.

== International career ==
Born in Germany to Equatorial Guinean parents, Aséko is a youth international for Germany, having played up to the Germany U20s. He also holds Equatorial Guinean nationality, making him eligible to represent the nation internationally.

== Career statistics ==
As of match played 1 November 2026

Appearances and goals by club, season and competition
Club	Season	League			Cup (Note: Includes DFB-Pokal)		Total	
Club	Season	Division	Apps	Goals	Apps	Goals	Apps	Goals
Bayern Munich II	2022–23	Regionalliga Bayern	8	0	—		8	0
Bayern Munich II	2023–24	Regionalliga Bayern	9	0	—		9	0
Bayern Munich II	2024–25	Regionalliga Bayern	13	2	—		13	2
Bayern Munich II	Total		30	2	—		30	2
Bayern Munich	2023–24	Bundesliga	0	0	0	0	0	0
Bayern Munich	2024–25	Bundesliga	0	0	0	0	0	0
Bayern Munich	Total		0	0	0	0	0	0
Hannover 96 (loan)	2024–25	2. Bundesliga	1	0	0	0	1	0
Hannover 96 (loan)	2025–26	2. Bundesliga	32	3	1	0	33	3
Hannover 96 (loan)	Total		33	3	1	0	34	3
Hannover 96 II (loan)	2024–25	3. Liga	10	0	—		10	0
Eintracht Frankfurt	2026–27	Bundesliga	6	0	1	0	7	0
Career Total			79	5	2	0	81	5

== Honours ==
Bayern Munich

- Bundesliga: 2024–25
