= Stefán Teitur Þórðarson =

Icelandic footballer (born 1998)

Personal information
- Full name: Stefán Teitur Þórðarson
- Date of birth: 16 October 1998 (age 28)
- Place of birth: Akranes, Iceland
- Height: 1.89 m (6 ft 2 in)
- Position: Midfielder

Team information
- Current team: Hannover 96
- Number: 23

Youth career
- –2015: ÍA

Senior career*
Years	Team	Apps	(Gls)
2015	Kári	1	(0)
2016–2020	ÍA	79	(21)
2020–2024	Silkeborg	103	(13)
2024–2026	Preston North End	54	(3)
2026–	Hannover 96	16	(3)

International career^{‡}
2018–2021	Iceland U21	16	(1)
2020–	Iceland	41	(1)
- * Club domestic league appearances and goals as of 18 May 2026 ‡ National team caps and goals as of 00:05, 14 November 2026 (UTC)

Stefán Teitur Þórðarson (born 16 October 1998) is an Icelandic professional footballer who plays as a midfielder for 2. Bundesliga club Hannover 96 and the Iceland national team.

== Club career ==
On 9 July 2024, Stefán Teitur signed for Championship club Preston North End on a three-year deal for an undisclosed fee.

After a good spell of starts, Stefán got his first goal for the club bending a beautiful finish into the far corner in a 2–1 win over Middlesbrough.

On 12 January 2026, Stefán Teitur signed for Hannover 96 for an undisclosed fee.

== International career ==
Stefán has played youth international games for the Icelandic U-21s. In January 2020 he made his senior international debut in a match against Canada, coming on as a 73rd-minute substitute for Aron Elís Þrándarson.

== Personal life ==
Stefán Teitur is from a huge family of footballers. He is the son of Þórður Þórðarson, a goalkeeper who played one senior international for Iceland. Stefán Teitur's father's brother is Stefán Þór Þórðarson who played six senior internationals for Iceland, scoring once. Stefán Teitur's grandfather's brothers are Ólafur Þórðarson who was capped 72 times by Iceland, scoring 5 goals, and Teitur Þórðarson who was capped 41 times by Iceland, scoring 9 goals, before coming a well-traveled manager. Stefán Teitur's great-grandfather was Þórður Þórðarson who scored 9 goals in 16 caps for Iceland. In addition Stefán Teitur's older brother, Þórður Þorsteinn Þórðarson, is a regular player in the Icelandic top tier and his cousin, Oliver Stefánsson, son of Stefán Þór, is contracted to IFK Norrköping.

Going further back, through his great-great-grandmother (mother of Þórður Þórðarson, born 1930) he is related to Pétur Pétursson, who got 41 caps for Iceland, scoring 11 goals. Through his great-grandmother (wife of Þórður Þórðarson, born 1930) he is related to Árni Sveinsson, who got 50 caps for Iceland, scoring 4 goals, Sveinn Teitsson, who got 22 caps and 2 goals for Iceland and Sigursteinn Gíslason, who got 22 caps for Iceland.

== Career statistics ==
=== Club ===
As of match played 8 March 2026

Appearances and goals by club, season and competition
Club	Season	League			National cup (Note: Includes Icelandic Cup, Danish Cup, FA Cup)		League cup (Note: Includes EFL Cup)		Other		Total	
Club	Season	Division	Apps	Goals	Apps	Goals	Apps	Goals	Apps	Goals	Apps	Goals
ÍA	2016	Úrvalsdeild	3	0	0	0	—		—		3	0
ÍA	2017	Úrvalsdeild	16	2	3	0	—		—		19	2
ÍA	2018	1. deild karla	22	10	3	1	—		—		25	11
ÍA	2019	Úrvalsdeild	20	1	2	0	—		—		22	1
ÍA	2020	Úrvalsdeild	17	8	2	1	—		—		19	9
ÍA	Total		78	21	10	2	—		—		88	23
Silkeborg	2020–21	Danish 1st Division	20	1	0	0	—		—		20	1
Silkeborg	2021–22	Danish Superliga	28	2	2	0	—		—		30	2
Silkeborg	2022–23	Danish Superliga	27	1	4	0	—		8 (Note: Two appearances in UEFA Europa League, six appearances in UEFA Europa Conference League)	1	39	2
Silkeborg	2023–24	Danish Superliga	28	9	8	2	—		—		31	11
Silkeborg	Total		103	13	14	2	—		8	1	125	16
Preston North End	2024–25	Championship	39	3	4	0	4	0	—		47	3
Preston North End	2025–26	Championship	15	0	0	0	2	0	—		17	0
Preston North End	Total		54	3	4	0	6	0	—		64	3
Hannover 96	2025–26	2. Bundesliga	7	1	—		—		—		7	1
Career total			242	38	28	4	6	0	8	1	285	43

=== International goals ===
As of match played 13 November 2026

Appearances and goals by national team and year
National team	Year	Apps	Goals
Iceland	2020	2	0
Iceland	2021	5	1
Iceland	2022	8	0
Iceland	2023	3	0
Iceland	2024	8	0
Iceland	2025	8	0
Iceland	2026	7	0
Total		41	1

As of match played 13 November 2025
Iceland score listed first, score column indicates score after each Stefán goal

List of international goals scored by Stefán Teitur Þórðarson
No.	Date	Venue	Opponent	Score	Result	Competition
1	11 October 2021	Laugardalsvöllur, Reykjavík, Iceland	Liechtenstein	1–0	4–0	2022 FIFA World Cup qualification

== Honours ==
Silkeborg

- Danish Cup: 2023–24
- The Atlantic Cup: 2024
