= Waniss Taïbi =

French footballer (born 2002)

Personal information
- Full name: Waniss Taïbi
- Date of birth: 7 March 2002 (age 24)
- Place of birth: Limoges, France
- Height: 1.84 m (6 ft 0 in)
- Position: Midfielder

Team information
- Current team: Hannover 96
- Number: 26

Youth career
- 2010-2012: US De La Bastide
- 2012-2013: US Vigenal Bastide
- 2013–2017: Limoges
- 2017–2021: Angers

Senior career*
Years	Team	Apps	(Gls)
2019–2021	Angers B	30	(0)
2021–2023	Angers	20	(0)
2023–2025	Rodez	70	(6)
2025–	Hannover 96	26	(1)

International career
2019–2020	France U18	9	(0)
2021	France U20	1	(0)
Medal record
Men's football
Representing France
FIFA U-17 World Cup
Third place	2019 Brazil
- * Club domestic league appearances and goals as of 18 May 2026

Waniss Taïbi (born 7 March 2002) is a French professional footballer who plays as a midfielder for 2. Bundesliga club Hannover 96.

== Club career ==
Waniss Taïbi made his debut for Angers on 7 March 2021, coming on as a substitute in a 5–0 Coupe de France win against Club Franciscain.

He made his Ligue 1 debut on 17 April, replacing Antonin Bobichon in the 66th minute in a 3–0 home defeat against Stade Rennais.

Taïbi moved to Hannover 96 ahead of the 2025–26 season on a four-year contract.

== International career ==
Born in France, Taïbi is of Algerian descent and has dual nationality. He is a youth international for France, having made three appearances and delivered two assists at the 2019 FIFA U-17 World Cup, a tournament in which France finished third.

In 2021, he was selected by Bernard Diomède for a training session with France under-19.

== Honours ==
France U17

- FIFA U-17 World Cup third place: 2019
