= Daisuke Yokota =

Japanese footballer (born 2000)

Daisuke Yokota 横田 大祐
Personal information
- Date of birth: 15 June 2000 (age 26)
- Place of birth: Itabashi, Japan
- Height: 1.69 m (5 ft 7 in)
- Position: Right winger

Team information
- Current team: Rangers
- Number: 17

Youth career
- 2011–2018: Kawasaki Frontale
- 2018–2019: FSV Frankfurt

Senior career*
| Years | Team | Apps | (Gls) |
| 2019–2020 | Carl Zeiss Jena II | 3 | (2) |
| 2021–2023 | Valmiera | 57 | (9) |
| 2023–2024 | Górnik Zabrze | 31 | (9) |
| 2024–2026 | Gent | 9 | (1) |
| 2024–2025 | → 1. FC Kaiserslautern (loan) | 25 | (4) |
| 2025–2026 | → Hannover 96 (loan) | 30 | (5) |
| 2026 | Hannover 96 | 0 | (0) |
| 2026– | Rangers | 4 | (0) |
- * Club domestic league appearances and goals as of 14:28, 5 August 2026 (UTC)

Daisuke Yokota (横田 大祐, Yokota Daisuke; born 15 June 2000) is a Japanese professional footballer who plays as a right winger for Scottish Premiership club Rangers.

== Early life ==
Yokota moved from Japan to Europe at the age of eighteen.

== Career ==
Yokota played for Latvian side Valmiera, where he was regarded as one of the club's most important players.

Yokota joined 1. FC Kaiserslautern on loan on 30 August 2024. He was subsequently loaned out to Hannover 96 for the 2025–26 season.

The move to Hannover was made permanent for the following season; however, instead of staying in Hannover, Yokota chose to join Rangers, signing a three-year contract on 5 August 2026.

== Style of play ==
Yokota mainly operates as a midfielder or winger and is known for his dribbling ability.

== Honours ==
Valmiera

- Latvian Higher League: 2022
