= Maurice Neubauer =

German footballer (born 1996)

Personal information
- Date of birth: 29 April 1996 (age 30)
- Place of birth: Recklinghausen, Germany
- Height: 1.78 m (5 ft 10 in)
- Position: Left-back

Team information
- Current team: Hannover 96
- Number: 33

Youth career
- 2001–2004: PSV Recklinghausen
- 2004–2011: Schalke 04
- 2011–2012: MSV Duisburg
- 2012–2015: Schalke 04

Senior career*
Years	Team	Apps	(Gls)
2015–2016	Schalke 04 II	36	(2)
2016–2018	Mainz 05 II	41	(4)
2018–2020	FC Homburg	55	(2)
2020–2025	SV Elversberg	153	(8)
2025–	Hannover 96	31	(2)
- * Club domestic league appearances and goals as of 18 May 2026

Maurice Neubauer (born 29 April 1996) is a German professional footballer who plays as a left-back for 2. Bundesliga club Hannover 96.

== Club career ==
Born in Recklinghausen, Neubauer started playing football in the youth team of local club PSV Recklinghausen and in 2004 moved to the youth team of Schalke 04. There he went through all of the youth teams with the exception of one year between 2011 and 2012, when he was active in the B youth team of MSV Duisburg, until 2015. For the 2015–16 season he was promoted to the second team of Schalke 04 and became a regular in the Regionalliga West. In the summer of 2016 he moved to Mainz 05 II in the 3. Liga, where he made his professional league debut in the following 2016–17 season, but was relegated with the team to the Regionalliga Südwest at the end of the season. Neubauer stayed in Mainz for another year and was subsequently able to establish himself as a regular player there.

For the 2018–19 season, he was signed by regional league competitor FC 08 Homburg. There, he was able to establish himself as a regular player and missed only two games in two years before the following season was prematurely canceled due to the COVID-19 pandemic.

In August 2020, he joined league rivals SV Elversberg. After only playing 16 games in his first season there due to injury, he was able to establish himself as a regular player in the following 2021–22 season and achieved promotion to the 3. Liga with the team as Regionalliga Südwest champions. In the following season, he and his club were promoted directly to the 2. Bundesliga, again as league champions, where he was also able to maintain his regular place as left-back.

Neubauer moved to Hannover 96 ahead of the 2025–26 season on a three-year contract.
