= Hendry Blank =

German footballer (born 2004)

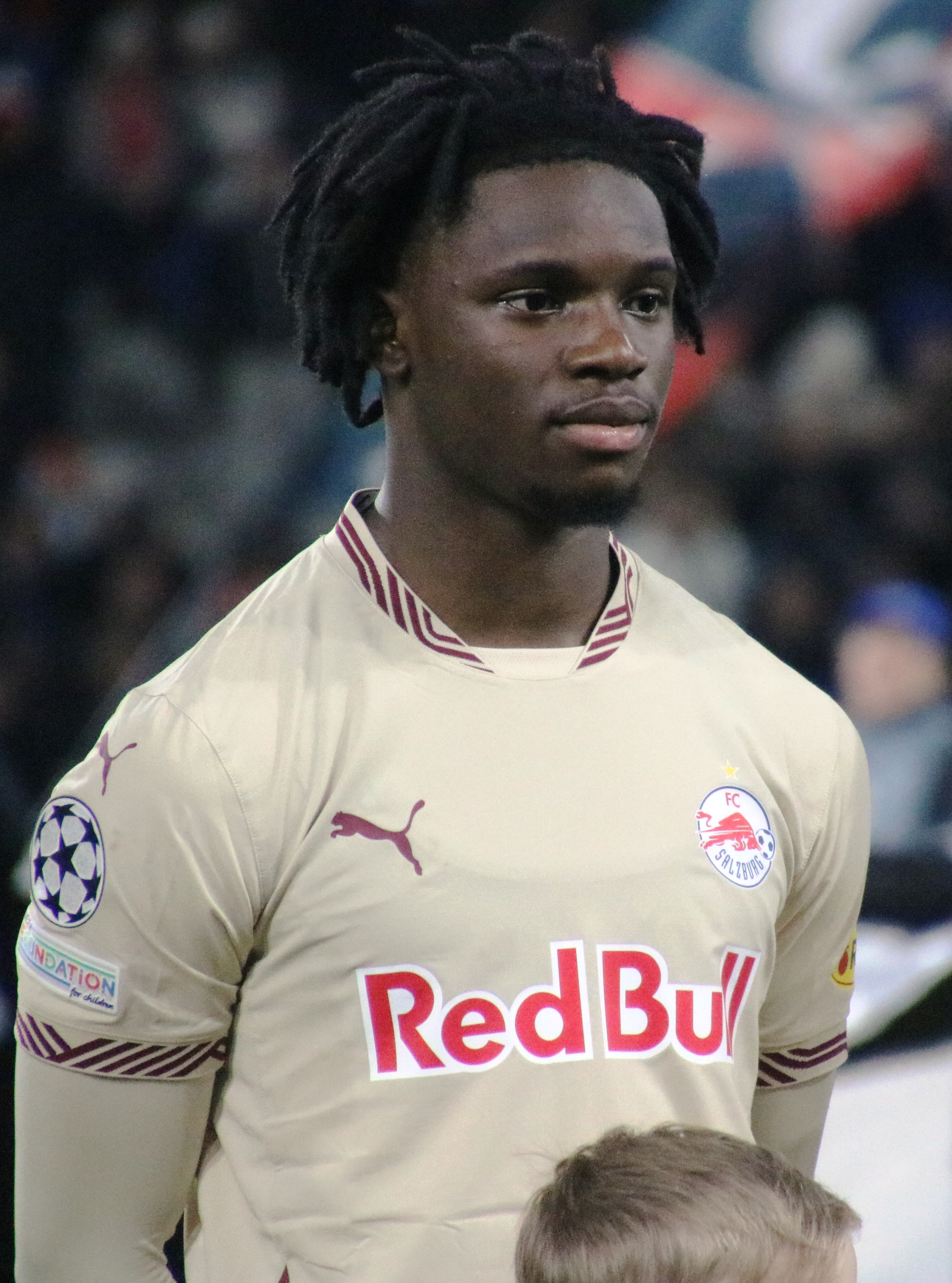
- Blank with Red Bull Salzburg in 2025

Personal information
- Full name: Hendry Aron Blank
- Date of birth: 21 August 2004 (age 22)
- Place of birth: Germany
- Height: 1.89 m (6 ft 2 in)
- Position: Centre-back

Team information
- Current team: Greuther Fürth (on loan from Red Bull Salzburg)
- Number: 34

Youth career
- Bayer Leverkusen
- 2019–2023: Borussia Dortmund

Senior career*
Years	Team	Apps	(Gls)
2023–2024	Borussia Dortmund II	13	(0)
2024	Borussia Dortmund	1	(0)
2024–	Red Bull Salzburg	6	(0)
2025–2026	→ Hannover 96 (loan)	12	(0)
2026–	→ Greuther Fürth (loan)	0	(0)

International career^{‡}
2023	Germany U20	3	(0)
2024–	Germany U21	6	(0)
- * Club domestic league appearances and goals as of 30 August 2026 ‡ National team caps and goals as of 15:20, 15 October 2025 (UTC)

Hendry Aron Blank (born 21 August 2004) is a German professional footballer who plays as a centre-back for 2. Bundesliga club Greuther Fürth, on loan from Austrian Bundesliga club Red Bull Salzburg.

== Club career ==
Blank is a youth product of Bayer Leverkusen, and moved to Borussia Dortmund's youth academy in the summer of 2019. He helped their U19s win the 2022–23 Under 19 Bundesliga, and was subsequently promoted to Borussia Dortmund II signing a professional contract on 13 June 2023 until 2025. He joined the senior Borussia Dortmund team for the preseason in the summer of 2023. He made his senior and professional debut with Borussia Dortmund II in a 1–0 3. Liga win over VfB Stuttgart II on 20 August 2023. Hours after a UEFA Youth League match Blank made his first appearance on the first team squad as a substitute in a 1–0 UEFA Champions League win over Newcastle United on 25 October 2023, although he didn't make an appearance. Blank made his first-team debut on 20 January 2024 in a Bundesliga game against 1. FC Köln, playing the second half of the 4–0 victory.

On 1 February 2024, Blank joined Red Bull Salzburg for €7 million until 2028. He was loaned out to Hannover 96 for the 2025–26 season.

== International career ==
Born in Germany, Blank is of Ghanaian, Malagasy and French descent. Blank holds both Malagasy and French citizenship. He is a youth international for Germany, having been called up to the Germany U20s in October 2023. He was called up to the German under-21 team in October 2024.

== Career statistics ==
As of match played 18 May 2026

Appearances and goals by club, season and competition
Club	Season	League			National cup (Note: Includes Austrian Cup)		Europe		Other		Total	
Club	Season	Division	Apps	Goals	Apps	Goals	Apps	Goals	Apps	Goals	Apps	Goals
Borussia Dortmund II	2023–24	3. Liga	13	0	—		—		—		13	0
Borussia Dortmund	2023–24	Bundesliga	1	0	0	0	0	0	0	0	1	0
Red Bull Salzburg	2023–24	Austrian Bundesliga	0	0	0	0	0	0	—		0	0
Red Bull Salzburg	2024–25	Austrian Bundesliga	6	0	3	0	6 (Note: Appearances in UEFA Champions League)	0	0	0	15	0
Red Bull Salzburg	Total		6	0	3	0	6	0	0	0	15	0
Hannover 96 (loan)	2025–26	2. Bundesliga	12	0	0	0	—		—		12	0
Career total			32	0	3	0	6	0	0	0	41	0
