= Bastian Allgeier =

German footballer (born 2002)

Personal information
- Date of birth: 18 February 2002 (age 24)
- Place of birth: Oberkirch, Germany
- Height: 1.94 m (6 ft 4 in)
- Position: Right-back

Team information
- Current team: Hannover 96
- Number: 17

Youth career
- –2011: FV Gamshurst
- 2011–2021: Karlsruher SC

Senior career*
Years	Team	Apps	(Gls)
2021–2023	Karlsruher SC	0	(0)
2021–2023	→ SSV Ulm (loan)	58	(4)
2023–2025	SSV Ulm	55	(2)
2025–	Hannover 96	17	(0)
- * Club domestic league appearances and goals as of 18 May 2026

Bastian Allgeier (born 18 February 2002) is a German professional footballer who plays as a right-back for Hannover 96.

== Career ==
In June 2021, Allgeier signed a professional contract with Karlsruhe, who directly loaned him out to Regionalliga Südwest club SSV Ulm for one season. He quickly established himself as a regular at the fourth-division club under coach Thomas Wörle. In the 2021–22 season, he missed out on promotion to the 3. Liga as runner-up behind SV Elversberg and lost the final of the 2021–22 Württemberg Cup with the team in a penalty shoot-out against Stuttgarter Kickers. Shortly beforehand, his contract with Karlsruher SC had been extended until 2024 and his loan until 2023. He was not a regular in the following season, but contributed three goals in 28 league games to the team's promotion to the third division.

In 2023, Allgeier moved permanently to SSV Ulm, where he signed a contract valid until 2025. He moved to Hannover 96 ahead of the 2025–26 season on a two-year contract.
