= Maik Nawrocki =

Polish footballer (born 2001)

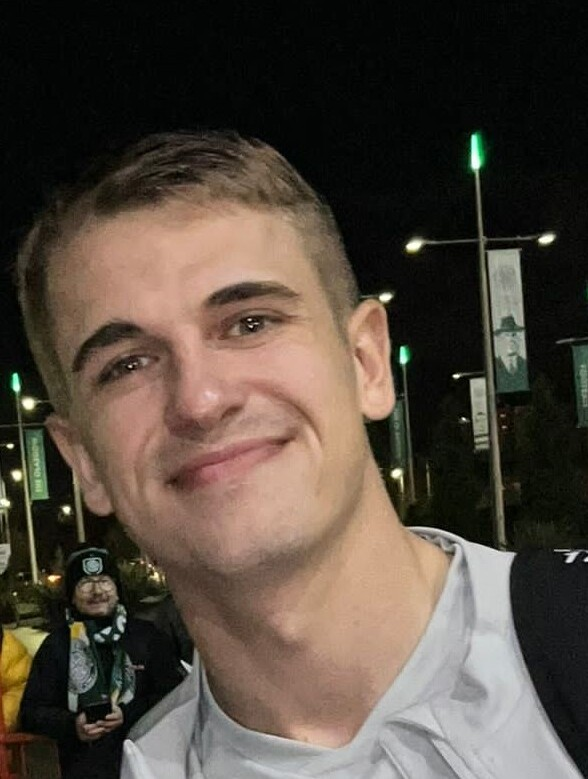
- Nawrocki in 2023

Personal information
- Full name: Maik Nawrocki
- Date of birth: 7 February 2001 (age 25)
- Place of birth: Bremen, Germany
- Height: 1.85 m (6 ft 1 in)
- Position: Centre-back

Team information
- Current team: Lens
- Number: 3

Youth career
- 2006–2019: Werder Bremen

Senior career*
Years	Team	Apps	(Gls)
2019–2022	Werder Bremen II	8	(1)
2021	→ Warta Poznań (loan)	3	(1)
2021–2022	→ Legia Warsaw (loan)	19	(1)
2022–2023	Legia Warsaw	25	(4)
2022	Legia Warsaw II	1	(0)
2023–2026	Celtic	13	(1)
2025–2026	→ Hannover 96 (loan)	17	(3)
2025	→ Hannover 96 II (loan)	1	(0)
2026–	Lens	2	(0)

International career
2016	Poland U15	1	(0)
2016–2017	Poland U16	5	(0)
2017–2018	Poland U17	9	(3)
2018	Poland U18	2	(1)
2018–2019	Poland U19	10	(4)
2021	Poland U21	4	(0)
- * Club domestic league appearances and goals as of 29 August 2026

Maik Nawrocki (born 7 February 2001) is a professional footballer who plays as a centre-back for Ligue 1 club Lens. Born in Germany, he has represented Poland at youth level.

== Club career ==
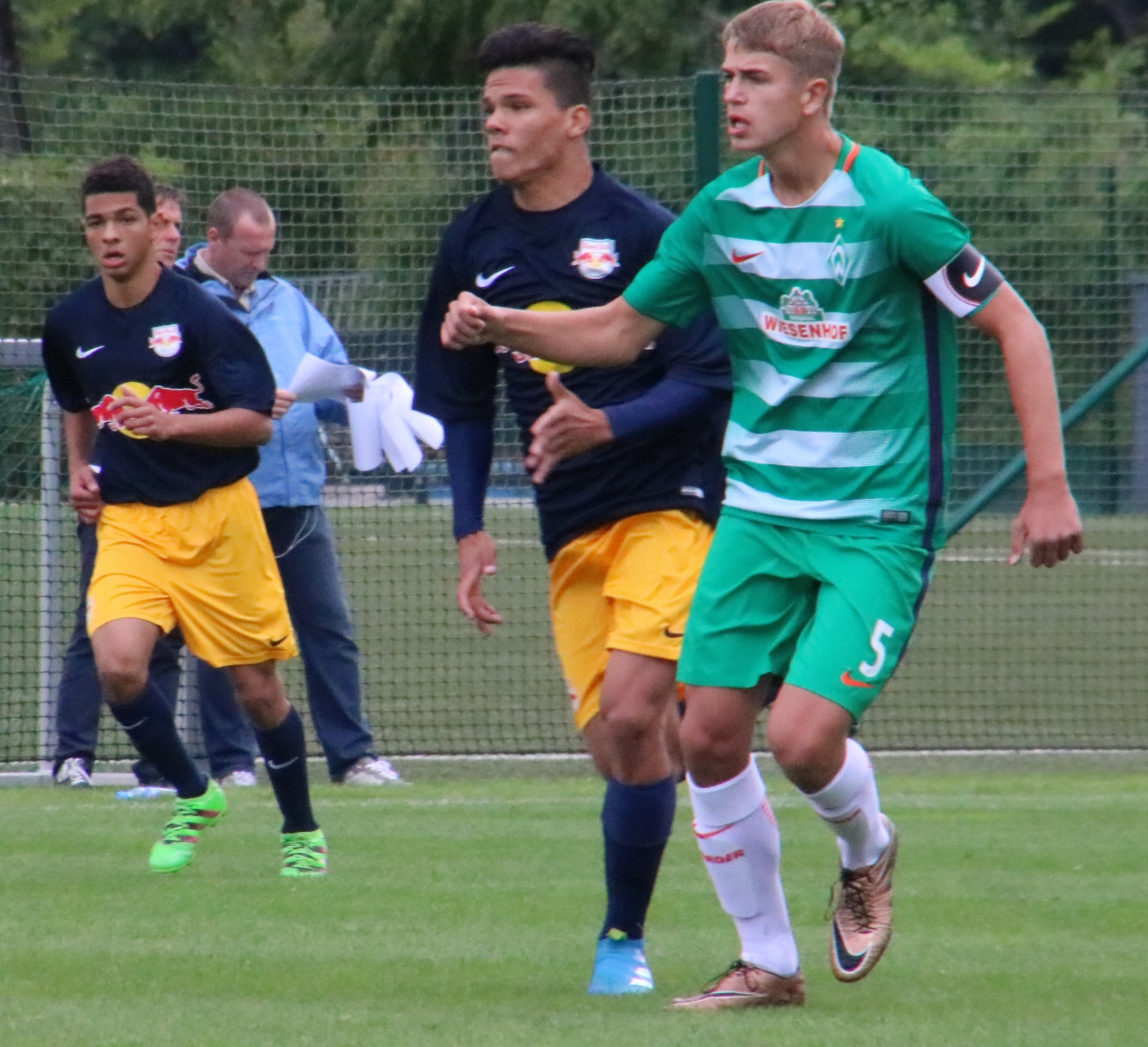
Nawrocki (in the green shirt on the right) playing for Werder Bremen in 2016

Nawrocki is a homegrown product of SV Werder Bremen's youth system, joining the club at the age of 5. He progressed to the reserve team playing in the Regionalliga Nord, and in February 2020 signed a professional contract with Werder Bremen.

Nawrocki joined Warta Poznań on loan in February 2021 after the Regionalliga Nord was postponed. He played three times for Warta in the Ekstraklasa, scoring one goal.

On 15 June 2021, it was announced that Nawrocki would be returning to Poland, joining reigning champions Legia Warsaw on loan for the 2021–22 season with an option to make the deal permanent. He joined Legia permanently on a three-year deal on 28 May 2022.

On 26 July 2023, Scottish Premiership side Celtic announced the signing of Nawrocki on a five-year deal, for a fee reported to be over £4.3 million. He made ten appearances in his first season, before falling out of favour in the 2024-25 season due to the form of Liam Scales and Auston Trusty. On 16 March 2025, due to injuries to both Scales and Trusty, Nawrocki made a rare start in a 3–2 defeat to Rangers, earning praise from fans and manager Brendan Rodgers for his performance.

Nawrocki was loaned out to Hannover 96 for the 2025–26 season with an option for a permanent transfer.

Nawrocki joined French side Lens, who had placed second in Ligue 1 the previous season, on 18 July 2026. Having started in Lens' three opening games of the season, he suffered a complete anterior cruciate ligament rupture during a league match against RC Strasbourg on 29 August.

== International career ==
Nawrocki has represented Poland internationally at youth levels U15 through U21.

He was named in the provisional squad for Poland for the 2022 FIFA World Cup, but he was not included in the final 26-man squad.

== Career statistics ==
As of match played 29 August 2026

Appearances and goals by club, season and competition
Club	Season	League			National cup (Note: Includes Polish Cup, Scottish Cup, DFB-Pokal)		League cup (Note: Includes Scottish League Cup)		Europe		Other		Total	
Club	Season	Division	Apps	Goals	Apps	Goals	Apps	Goals	Apps	Goals	Apps	Goals	Apps	Goals
Werder Bremen II	2019–20	Regionalliga Nord	1	0	—		—		—		—		1	0
Werder Bremen II	2020–21	Regionalliga Nord	7	1	—		—		—		—		7	1
Werder Bremen II	Total		8	1	—		—		—		—		8	1
Warta Poznań (loan)	2020–21	Ekstraklasa	3	1	—		—		—		—		3	1
Legia Warsaw (loan)	2021–22	Ekstraklasa	19	1	2	0	—		8 (Note: Two appearances in UEFA Champions League, six appearances in UEFA Europa League)	0	—		29	1
Legia Warsaw	2022–23	Ekstraklasa	25	4	5	0	—		—		—		30	4
Legia Warsaw	2023–24	Ekstraklasa	0	0	—		—		—		1 (Note: Appearance in Polish Super Cup)	0	1	0
Legia Warsaw	Total		25	4	5	0	—		—		1	0	31	4
Legia Warsaw II	2022–23	III liga, gr. I	1	0	—		—		—		—		1	0
Celtic	2023–24	Scottish Premiership	10	0	2	0	1	0	0	0	—		13	0
Celtic	2024–25	Scottish Premiership	3	1	1	0	1	0	0	0	—		5	1
Celtic	Total		13	1	3	0	2	0	0	0	—		18	1
Hannover 96 (loan)	2025–26	2. Bundesliga	17	3	0	0	—		—		—		17	3
Hannover 96 II (loan)	2025–26	Regionalliga Nord	1	0	—		—		—		—		1	0
Lens	2026–27	Ligue 1	2	0	0	0	—		0	0	1 (Note: Appearance in Trophée des Champions)	0	3	0
Career total			89	11	10	0	2	0	8	0	2	0	111	11

== Honours ==
Legia Warsaw

- Polish Cup: 2022–23
- Polish Super Cup: 2023

Celtic

- Scottish Premiership: 2023–24, 2024–25
- Scottish Cup: 2023–24
- Scottish League Cup: 2024–25

Lens

- Trophée des Champions: 2026
