= Benjamin Källman =

Finnish footballer (born 1998)

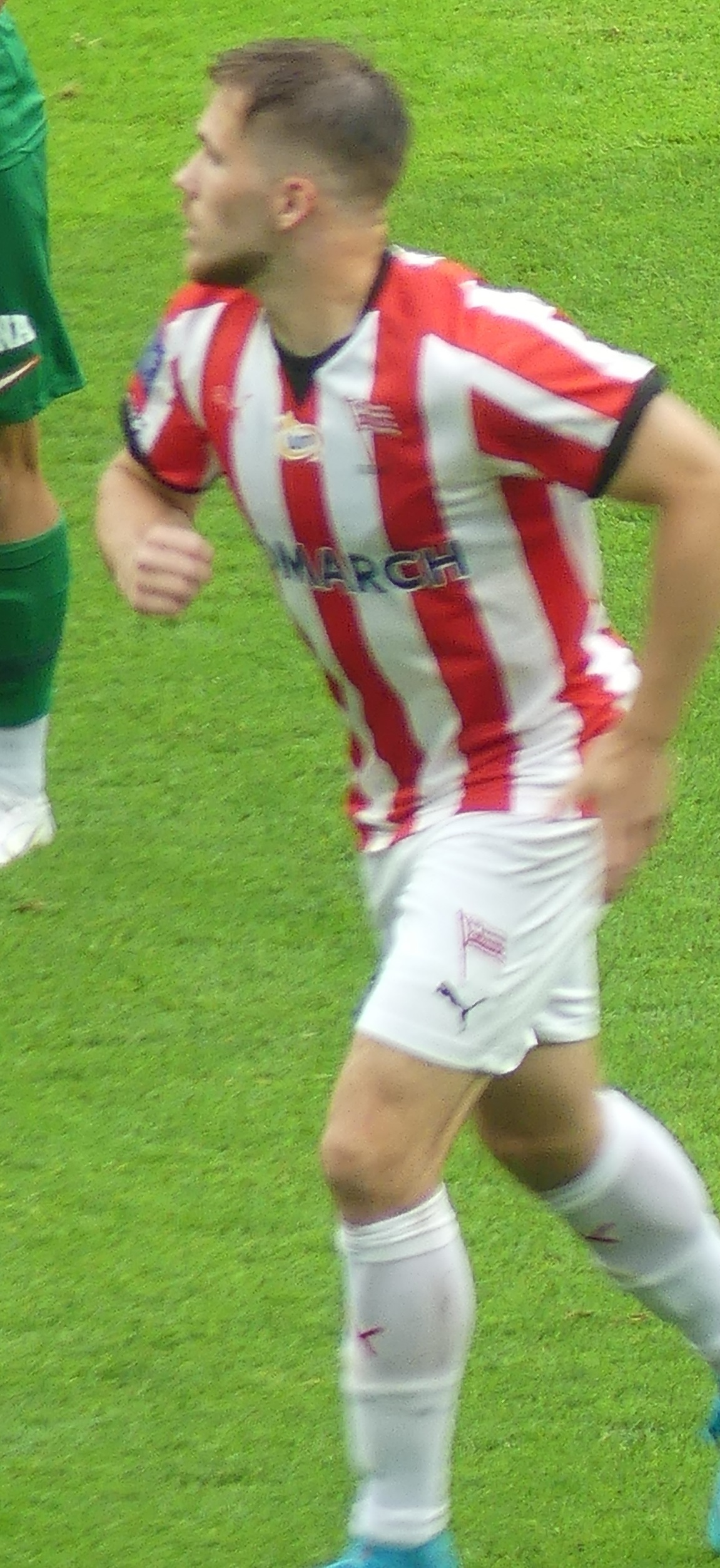
- Källman with Cracovia in 2022

Personal information
- Full name: Paul Benjamin Källman
- Date of birth: 17 June 1998 (age 28)
- Place of birth: Ekenäs, Finland
- Height: 1.81 m (5 ft 11 in)
- Position: Forward

Team information
- Current team: Hannover 96
- Number: 9

Youth career
- –2012: EIF
- 2012–2013: Honka

Senior career*
Years	Team	Apps	(Gls)
2014–2015	EIF	38	(6)
2016–2022	Inter Turku	122	(44)
2016	→ EIF (loan)	7	(3)
2018–2019	→ Dundee (loan)	18	(1)
2019	→ Vendsyssel FF (loan)	7	(2)
2019	→ Viking (loan)	11	(3)
2020	→ Haugesund (loan)	10	(0)
2022–2025	Cracovia	101	(33)
2025–	Hannover 96	33	(14)

International career^{‡}
2016–2017	Finland U19	5	(0)
2017–2020	Finland U21	19	(12)
2018–	Finland	42	(11)
- * Club domestic league appearances and goals as of 18 May 2026 ‡ National team caps and goals as of 13 November 2026

Paul Benjamin Källman (born 17 June 1998) is a Finnish professional footballer who plays as a forward for 2. Bundesliga club Hannover 96 and the Finland national team.

== Club career ==
=== Early career ===
Born in Ekenäs, Källman started playing football in his hometown club Ekenäs IF (EIF). Growing up, he also played handball in BK-46.

After a stint in a youth sector of FC Honka, Källman made his senior debut for EIF in the third-tier Kakkonen on 3 May 2014, at the age of 15.

=== Inter Turku and loans ===
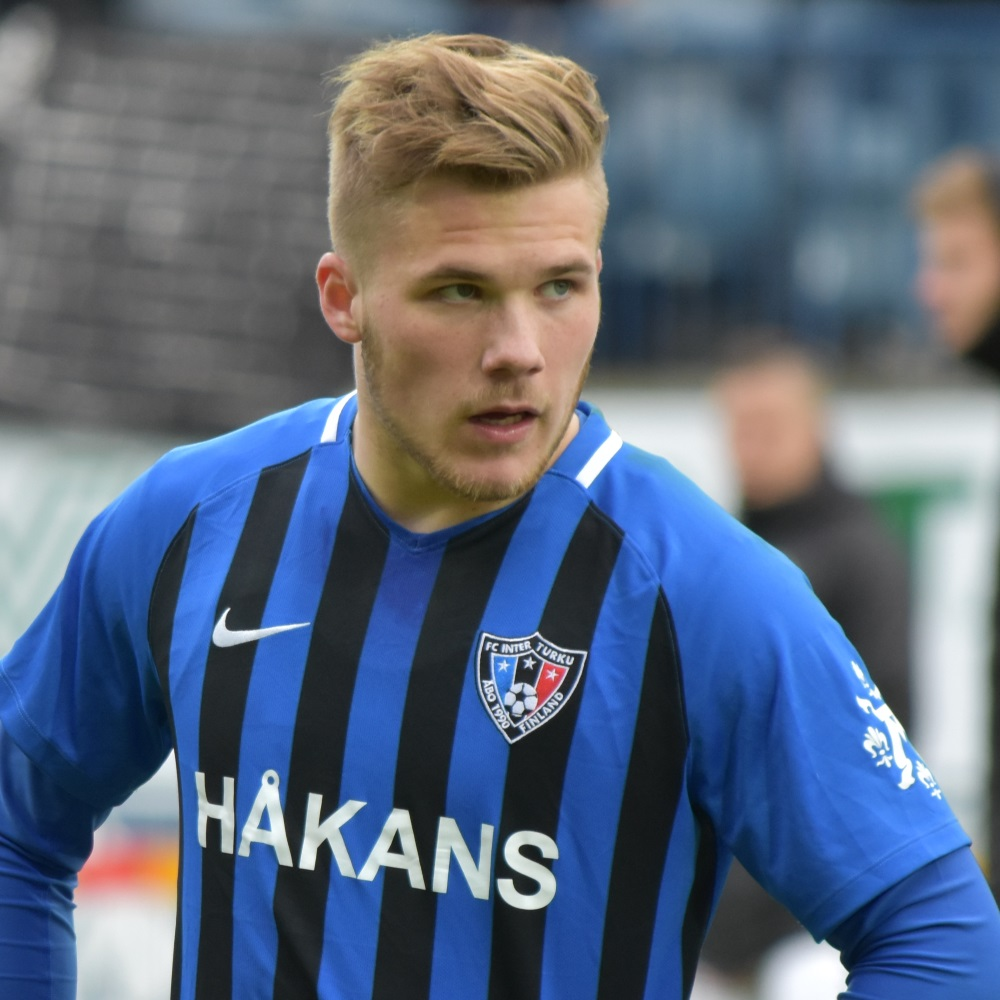
Källman with Inter Turku in 2018

On 25 November 2015, Källman signed his first contract with Inter Turku in Finnish top-tier Veikkausliiga, starting in 2016.

In August 2018, he signed on loan for Scottish Premiership club Dundee, with an option to buy.

On 30 January 2019, he was then loaned out to Vendsyssel FF in the Danish Superliga.

In July 2019 he was loaned out to Eliteserien club Viking FK in Norway.

In February 2020, Källman was sent on loan to Norwegian FK Haugesund.

Källman returned to his parent club Inter in August 2020. Next 2021 Veikkausliiga season, Källman scored 14 goals and was the league's joint top scorer with Ariel Ngueukam. He left Inter at the end of June 2022.

=== Cracovia ===
On 2 July 2022, Källman moved to Polish side Cracovia on a free transfer, signing a three-year contract with the club. He scored his first goal in Ekstraklasa on 29 July 2022, in a 3–0 home win over Legia Warsaw. On 22 April 2023, Källman scored his first brace in the league, in a 2–1 away win against Lechia Gdansk. His second brace in Polish top tier occurred on 20 December 2023, defeating Legia Warsaw 2–0 at home.

On 18 August 2024, Källman scored his first brace of the 2024–25 season, helping his side to a 4–2 away win against Jagiellonia Białystok. At the turn of November, Källman scored two braces in two consecutive Ekstraklasa victories, against Motor Lublin and Lechia Gdansk, respectively. Subsequently, Polish media reported of a notable offer previously made by an unnamed Turkish club, which Cracovia had rejected. In mid-May 2025, it was announced that Källman would leave Cracovia after the season following the expiration of his contract.

=== Hannover 96 ===
On 20 May 2025, German 2. Bundesliga club Hannover 96 announced the signing of Källman on a three-year deal on a free transfer, starting in the 2025–26 season, making him the second Finnish player to represent Hannover after Mikael Forssell. On 9 August, he scored his first goal for Hannover in 2. Bundesliga, in a 2–0 away win against Fortuna Düsseldorf. Three weeks later, he scored the winning goal against Holstein Kiel in a 2–1 away victory, with his third goal in his fourth appearance, all as a substitute. On 26 October, Källman scored his first brace in 2. Bundesliga, in a 3–0 away win against Eintracht Braunschweig. On 22 November, Källman scored a brace in a 2–0 away win against the league leaders SC Paderborn.

== International career ==
A former Finnish youth international, Källman made his full international debut for the Finland national team in 2018. He scored his first international goal in his second international appearance on 11 June 2019, in a UEFA Euro 2020 qualifying win against Liechtenstein.

== Personal life ==
Källman is a Swedish-speaking Finn. His father Mikael Källman is widely considered to be Finland's greatest handball player of all time.

== Career statistics ==
=== Club ===
As of 18 May 2026

Appearances and goals by club, season and competition
Club	Season	League			National cup (Note: Includes Finnish Cup, Scottish Cup, Danish Cup, Norwegian Cup, Polish Cup and DFB-Pokal)		League cup (Note: Includes Finnish League Cup and Scottish League Cup)		Europe		Other		Total	
Club	Season	Division	Apps	Goals	Apps	Goals	Apps	Goals	Apps	Goals	Apps	Goals	Apps	Goals
EIF	2014	Kakkonen	13	1	1	1	—		—		—		14	2
EIF	2015	Ykkönen	25	5	1	0	—		—		—		26	5
EIF	Total		38	6	0	0	—		—		–		38	6
EIF Akademi	2015	Kolmonen	7	4	—		—		—		—		7	4
Inter Turku	2016	Veikkausliiga	22	2	5	1	0	0	—		—		27	3
Inter Turku	2017	Veikkausliiga	31	9	6	3	—		—		—		37	12
Inter Turku	2018	Veikkausliiga	20	8	7	8	—		—		—		27	16
Inter Turku	2019	Veikkausliiga	0	0	0	0	—		0	0	—		0	0
Inter Turku	2020	Veikkausliiga	10	4	1	0	—		1 (Note: Appearances in UEFA Europa League)	0	—		12	4
Inter Turku	2021	Veikkausliiga	27	14	5	0	—		2 (Note: Appearances in UEFA Europa Conference League)	1	—		34	15
Inter Turku	2022	Veikkausliiga	12	7	2	1	6	6	0	0	—		20	14
Inter Turku	Total		122	44	26	13	6	6	3	1	0	0	157	64
EIF (loan)	2016	Ykkönen	7	3	0	0	—		—		—		7	3
Dundee (loan)	2018–19	Scottish Premiership	18	1	1	0	0	0	—		—		19	1
Vendsyssel FF (loan)	2018–19	Danish Superliga	7	2	0	0	—		—		4 (Note: Appearances in Danish Superliga relegation play-offs)	0	11	2
Viking (loan)	2019	Eliteserien	11	3	2	1	—		—		—		13	4
Haugesund (loan)	2020	Eliteserien	10	0	—		—		—		—		10	0
Cracovia	2022–23	Ekstraklasa	34	6	2	0	—		—		—		36	6
Cracovia	2023–24	Ekstraklasa	33	9	3	0	—		—		—		36	9
Cracovia	2024–25	Ekstraklasa	34	18	1	0	—		—		—		35	18
Cracovia	Total		101	33	6	0	0	0	0	0	0	0	107	33
Hannover 96	2025–26	2. Bundesliga	33	14	1	0	—		—		—		34	14
Career total			354	110	38	15	6	6	3	1	4	0	405	132

=== International ===
As of match played 12 November 2026

Appearances and goals by national team and year
National team	Year	Apps	Goals
Finland
Finland	2018	1	0
Finland	2019	1	1
Finland	2020	0	0
Finland	2021	0	0
Finland	2022	8	3
Finland	2023	7	2
Finland	2024	10	1
Finland	2025	10	3
Finland	2026	5	1
Total		42	11

Scores and results list Finland's goal tally first, score column indicates score after each Källman goal.

List of international goals scored by Benjamin Källman
No.	Date	Venue	Opponent	Score	Result	Competition
1	11 June 2019	Rheinpark Stadion, Vaduz, Liechtenstein	Liechtenstein	2–0	2–0	UEFA Euro 2020 qualification
2	14 June 2022	Bilino Polje Stadium, Zenica, Bosnia and Herzegovina	Bosnia and Herzegovina	2–1	2–3	2022–23 UEFA Nations League B
3	26 September 2022	City Stadium, Podgorica, Montenegro	Montenegro	2–0	2–0	2022–23 UEFA Nations League B
4	20 November 2022	Ullevaal Stadion, Oslo, Norway	Norway	1–0	1–1	Friendly
5	26 March 2023	Windsor Park, Belfast, Northern Ireland	Northern Ireland	1–0	1–0	UEFA Euro 2024 qualification
6	19 June 2023	Helsinki Olympic Stadium, Helsinki, Finland	San Marino	2–0	6–0	UEFA Euro 2024 qualification
7	7 June 2024	Hampden Park, Glasgow, Scotland	Scotland	1–2	2–2	Friendly
8	10 June 2025	Helsinki Olympic Stadium, Helsinki, Finland	Poland	2–0	2–1	2026 FIFA World Cup qualification
9	7 September 2025	Silesian Stadium, Chorzów, Poland	Poland	1–3	1–3	2026 FIFA World Cup qualification
10	9 October 2025	Helsinki Olympic Stadium, Helsinki, Finland	Lithuania	1–1	2–1	2026 FIFA World Cup qualification
11	26 September 2026	San Marino Stadium, Serravalle, San Marino	San Marino	3–0	7–0	2026–27 UEFA Nations League C

== Honours ==
Inter Turku

- Finnish Cup: 2017–18

Viking

- Norwegian Cup: 2019

Individual

- Veikkausliiga top scorer: 2021
- Veikkausliiga Team of the Year: 2021
- Veikkausliiga Player of the Month: June 2022
