= Franz Roggow =

German footballer (born 2002)

Personal information
- Date of birth: 14 July 2002 (age 24)
- Place of birth: Eberswalde, Germany
- Height: 1.81 m (5 ft 11 in)
- Position: Midfielder

Team information
- Current team: Hannover 96
- Number: 13

Youth career
- 2006–2013: Jahn Bad Freienwalde
- 2013–2015: Preussen Eberswalde
- 2015–2018: Energie Cottbus
- 2018–2021: FC St. Pauli

Senior career*
Years	Team	Apps	(Gls)
2021–2023	FC St. Pauli	0	(0)
2021–2023	FC St. Pauli II	33	(10)
2023–2025	Borussia Dortmund II	70	(6)
2025–	Hannover 96	7	(0)
2025–	Hannover 96 II	2	(1)
- * Club domestic league appearances and goals as of 18 May 2026

Franz Roggow (born 14 July 2002) is a German footballer who plays as a midfielder for Hannover 96.

== Early life ==
Roggow joined the youth academy of German side Energie Cottbus at the age of twelve. He attended Julius-Leber-Schule in Germany.

== Career ==
Roggow started his career with German side FC St. Pauli. He was regarded as one of the club's most promising prospects. In 2023, he signed for German side Borussia Dortmund II. On 5 August 2023, he debuted for the club during a 0–0 draw with Preußen Münster. On 17 February 2024, he scored his first two goals for the club during a 5–2 win over SC Verl.

Roggow joined 2. Bundesliga club Hannover 96 ahead of the 2025–26 season on a three-year contract.

== Style of play ==
Roggow mainly operates as a midfielder. He is left-footed.

== Personal life ==
Roggow is a native of Bad Freienwalde, Germany.
