= Noah Weißhaupt =

German footballer (born 2001)

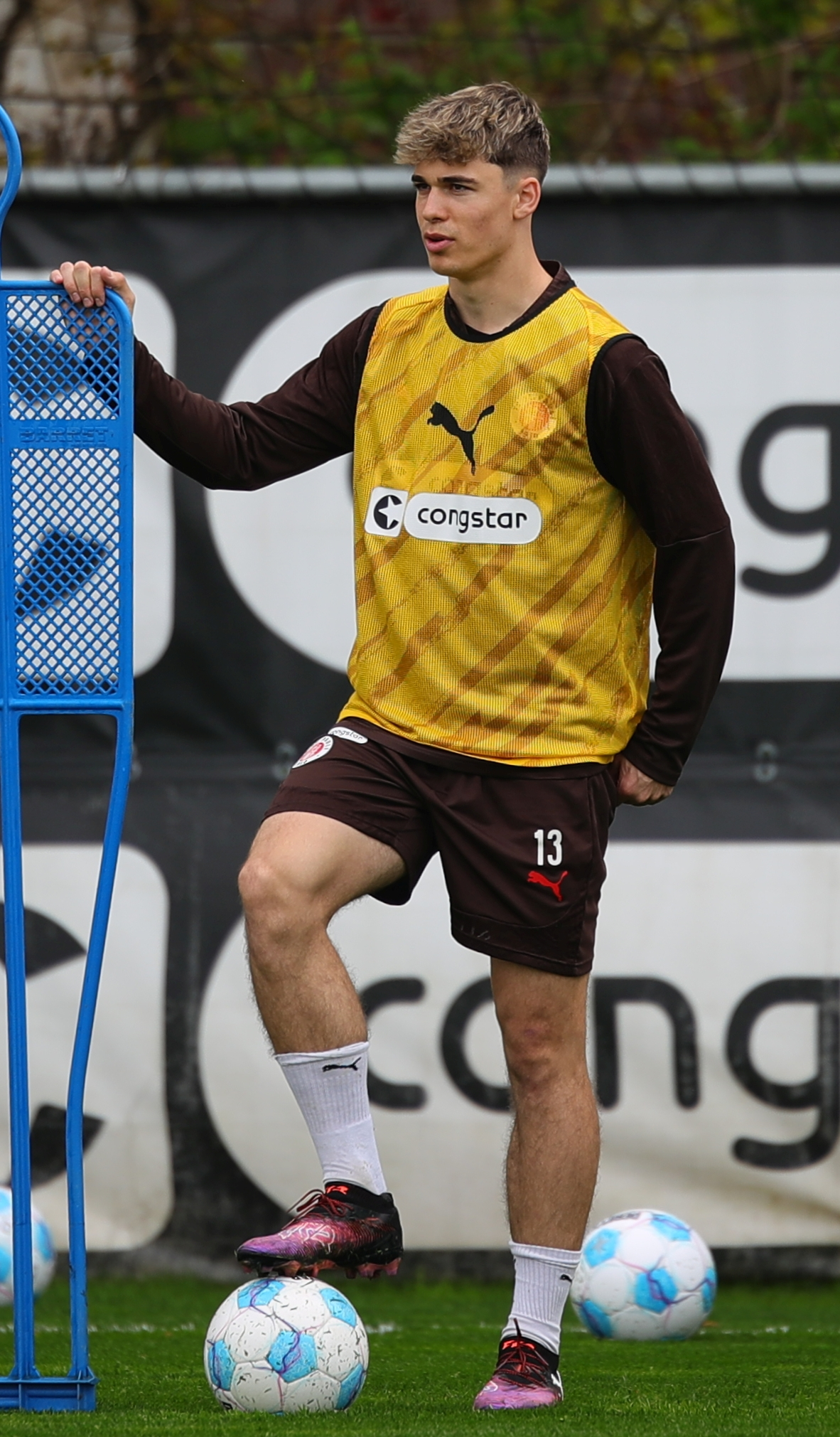
- Weißhaupt in 2025

Personal information
- Full name: Noah Raphael Weißhaupt
- Date of birth: 20 September 2001 (age 25)
- Place of birth: Rostock, Germany
- Height: 1.81 m (5 ft 11 in)
- Position: Winger

Team information
- Current team: Darmstadt 98
- Number: 7

Youth career
- SV Kappel
- –2012: SV Ebnet
- 2012–2020: SC Freiburg

Senior career*
Years	Team	Apps	(Gls)
2020–2024	SC Freiburg II	44	(8)
2021–2026	SC Freiburg	55	(1)
2025	→ FC St. Pauli (loan)	19	(1)
2025–2026	→ Legia Warsaw (loan)	7	(0)
2026	→ Hannover 96 (loan)	6	(1)
2026–	Darmstadt 98	0	(0)

International career
2018	Germany U18	1	(0)
2020–2021	Germany U20	4	(0)
2022–2023	Germany U21	6	(0)
- * Club domestic league appearances and goals as of 1 July 2026

Noah Raphael Weißhaupt (born 20 September 2001) is a German professional footballer who plays as a winger for 2. Bundesliga club Darmstadt 98.

== Club career ==
Born in Rostock, Weißhaupt played for SV Kappel and SV Ebnet before joining SC Freiburg's academy in 2012. He was promoted to SC Freiburg II for the 2020–21 season and scored five goals and assisted a further 11 in 33 matches. In summer 2021, he extended his contract with the club and was promoted to the first team. He made his first-team debut on 12 September 2021 as an 87th minute substitute for Lukas Kübler in a 1–1 Bundesliga draw with 1. FC Köln, and was involved in Freiburg's 89th minute equaliser when Köln defender Rafael Czichos turned Weißhaupt's cross into his own goal.

On 2 January 2025, FC St. Pauli announced that Weißhaupt would be moving to the Hamburg district club on loan. On 1 September 2025, he again moved on loan, this time joining Ekstraklasa club Legia Warsaw with an option to make the move permanent. On 5 January 2026, his loan to Warsaw was cut short and he was instead loaned out to 2. Bundesliga club Hannover 96 for the remainder of the season.

Ahead of the 2026–27 season, Weißhaupt joined Darmstadt 98.

== International career ==
Weißhaupt has represented Germany at under-18, under-20 and under-21 international levels.

== Personal life ==
He is the son of former footballer Marco Weißhaupt.

== Career statistics ==
As of match played 18 May 2026

Appearances and goals by club, season and competition
Club	Season	League			National cup (Note: Includes DFB-Pokal)		Continental		Other		Total	
Club	Season	Division	Apps	Goals	Apps	Goals	Apps	Goals	Apps	Goals	Apps	Goals
SC Freiburg II	2020–21	Regionalliga Südwest	31	5	—		—		—		31	5
SC Freiburg II	2021–22	3. Liga	11	3	—		—		—		11	3
SC Freiburg II	2022–23	3. Liga	1	0	—		—		—		1	0
SC Freiburg II	2024–25	Regionalliga Südwest	1	0	—		—		—		1	0
SC Freiburg II	Total		44	8	—		—		—		44	8
SC Freiburg	2021–22	Bundesliga	10	0	3	0	—		—		13	0
SC Freiburg	2022–23	Bundesliga	18	0	3	0	6 (Note: Appearances in UEFA Europa League)	0	—		27	0
SC Freiburg	2023–24	Bundesliga	24	1	1	0	8	1	—		33	2
SC Freiburg	2024–25	Bundesliga	3	0	2	0	—		—		5	0
SC Freiburg	Total		55	1	9	0	14	1	—		78	2
FC St. Pauli (loan)	2024–25	Bundesliga	19	1	—		—		—		19	1
Legia Warsaw (loan)	2025–26	Ekstraklasa	7	0	0	0	3 (Note: Appearances in UEFA Conference League)	0	—		10	0
Hannover 96 (loan)	2025–26	2. Bundesliga	6	1	0	0	—		—		6	1
Darmstadt 98	2026–27	2. Bundesliga	0	0	0	0	—		—		0	0
Career total			131	11	9	0	17	1	0	0	157	12
