= Mustapha Bundu =

Sierra Leonean footballer (born 1997)

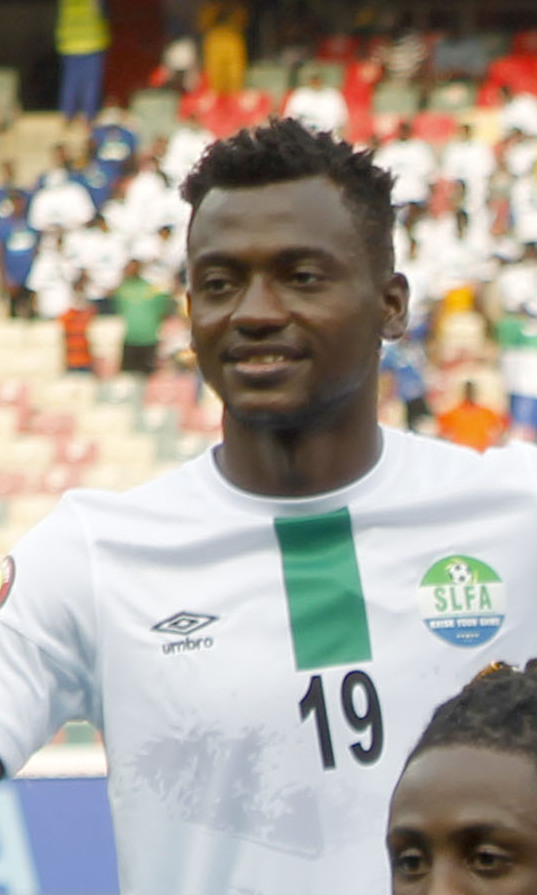
- Bundu in 2022

Personal information
- Full name: Mustapha Bundu
- Date of birth: 28 February 1997 (age 29)
- Place of birth: Freetown, Sierra Leone
- Height: 1.88 m (6 ft 2 in)
- Position: Forward

Team information
- Current team: Hannover 96
- Number: 7

Youth career
- 2010-2014: Craig Bellamy Academy
- 2014-2016: Hartpury College

Senior career*
Years	Team	Apps	(Gls)
2015	Newquay	1	(2)
2015–2016	Hereford	17	(17)
2016–2020	AGF	101	(17)
2020–2023	Anderlecht	10	(0)
2021	→ Copenhagen (loan)	14	(1)
2021–2022	→ AGF (loan)	22	(3)
2022–2023	→ Andorra (loan)	28	(3)
2023–2025	Plymouth Argyle	64	(13)
2025–	Hannover 96	22	(4)

International career^{‡}
2019–	Sierra Leone	22	(4)
- * Club domestic league appearances and goals as of 18 May 2026 ‡ National team caps and goals as of 18:50, 20 March 2025 (UTC)

Mustapha Bundu (born 28 February 1997) is a Sierra Leonean professional footballer who plays as a forward for 2. Bundesliga club Hannover 96 and the Sierra Leone national team.

Born in Freetown, Bundu started playing youth football for the Craig Bellamy Academy before moving to the United Kingdom to play for Hartpury College. He then went on to appear for lower league sides Newquay and Hereford. In 2016, Bundu signed for Danish Superliga club AGF after a successful trial. After growing out to become an important player for the first team, he transferred to Anderlecht in 2020. He returned to English football with Plymouth Argyle in 2023, spending two seasons and suffering relegation to the third tier, before moving to Hannover 96 in 2025.

After multiple call-ups for the Sierra Leone national team without making an appearance, Bundu made his international debut as a substitute on 4 September 2019, in a 2022 FIFA World Cup qualifier against Liberia.

== Club career ==
=== Early career ===
As a native of Freetown, Sierra Leone, Bundu spent his youth football playing in the now defunct Craig Bellamy Academy, before obtaining a student visa to study at Hartpury College to further pursue his football career.

He graduated from Hartpury College in 2016, scoring 18 goals in six outings in the English Schools' FA Cup.

=== Hereford ===
Whilst visiting a friend, he made a single appearance for Newquay on 23 August 2015, in a 2–2 draw against Ivybridge Town in the South West Peninsula League, netting two goals in less than 30 minutes as a substitute. Newquay manager Sash Wheatman acclaimed him as "the best player he's had the privilege of watching at this level of football", adding "it was like bringing on Ronaldo on or Gareth Bale – he was streets ahead".

Bundu spent a season at newly-formed Midland League Premier Division club Hereford, winning three trophies and reaching the 2016 FA Vase final at Wembley Stadium, where he featured as a substitute. Work authorisation restrictions only allowed him to ply his trade at a club no higher than step five of the English non-league pyramid, the ninth tier overall in the English football league system, which forced him to leave Hereford as they had been promoted to step four (tier eight). He returned briefly to spectate one of their games, a 6–0 defeat of Bridgwater Town in the Southern League Division One South & West.

=== AGF ===
Bundu went on a trial with Danish Superliga club AGF in early August 2016. After a successful trial, he signed a contract with the club on 31 August 2016.

In an away defeat to Brøndby IF, he made his Superliga debut as a substitute on 23 October 2016. He came on the pitch in the 78th minute, replacing Martin Spelmann. In December 2016, Bundu extended his contract until 2021.

Bundu had his breakout season in 2019–20, scoring eight goals in the first 20 league matches of the season, and being named Superliga Player of the Month for September 2019. He finished the season with 10 goals in 30 total appearances, as he helped AGF finish in third place in the Superliga-table; the club's first top-three finish in 23 years. Bundu's season would, however, be hampered in the last month by contracting COVID-19 which kept him out for the last few games of the season.

=== Anderlecht ===
On 7 August 2020, Bundu joined Belgian club Anderlecht on a four-year contract for an undisclosed fee, believed to be between DKK 25–30 million, making him the most expensive sale in the history of AGF.

Playing only nine games for Anderlecht, Bundu decided to go out on loan and returned to Denmark, signing a loan deal with Copenhagen for the rest of the season with an option to buy. On 1 September 2021, Bundu returned to AGF on loan for the rest of the season.

On 1 September 2022, Bundu joined Segunda División club FC Andorra on a one-year loan deal, making his debut in a 1–1 draw against Mirandés. While at Andorra, he became their first foreign player to receive an international call-up, while also winning the 2022–23 Copa Catalunya.

=== Plymouth Argyle ===
On 1 September 2023, deadline day of England's summer transfer window, Bundu returned to England, signing a two-year deal with EFL Championship club Plymouth Argyle. His visa application meant he could not enter the UK until 13 September, the day after which he trained for the first time at his new club. He made his debut for the club on 23 September as an 87th-minute substitute in a 6–2 EFL Championship victory over Norwich City, and assisted a 97th-minute goal. He scored his first goal in his first league start for the club on 25 October, a first-half free-kick in a 3–0 win against Sheffield Wednesday.

=== Hannover 96 ===
On 25 June 2025, it was announced that Bundu had signed a three-year contract with 2. Bundesliga club Hannover 96 on a free transfer after rejecting a contract extension at Plymouth.

== International career ==
Bundu received his first international call-up for Sierra Leone in August 2018, being included in a 35-man provisional squad for a 2019 Africa Cup of Nations qualifier against Ethiopia. However, he did not make the final 23-man squad. He made his debut in a 2022 FIFA World Cup qualifier match against Liberia on 4 September 2019, which ended in a 3–1 defeat. He scored his first goal for his country on 13 November 2020, in a 2021 Africa Cup of Nations qualifier against Nigeria.

== Career statistics ==
=== Club ===
As of match played 9 August 2025

Appearances and goals by club, season and competition
Club	Season	League			National cup (Note: Includes Danish Cup, Copa del Rey, FA Cup, DFB-Pokal)		League cup (Note: Includes EFL Cup)		Continental		Other		Total	
Club	Season	Division	Apps	Goals	Apps	Goals	Apps	Goals	Apps	Goals	Apps	Goals	Apps	Goals
Newquay	2015–16	SWPL Premier Division	1	2	—		—		—		—		1	2
Hereford	2015–16	Midland League; Premier Division	17	17	—		—		—		11 (Note: Eight appearances, five goals in FA Vase; three appearances, two goals in Midland Football League Cup)	7	28	24
AGF	2016–17	Danish Superliga	12	1	2	0	—		—		—		14	1
AGF	2017–18	Danish Superliga	31	4	2	2	—		—		—		33	6
AGF	2018–19	Danish Superliga	31	4	1	0	—		—		—		32	4
AGF	2019–20	Danish Superliga	27	8	3	2	—		—		—		30	10
AGF	Total		101	17	8	4	—		—		—		109	21
Anderlecht	2020–21	Belgian First Division A	9	0	0	0	—		—		—		9	0
Anderlecht	2021–22	Belgian First Division A	1	0	0	0	—		1 (Note: Appearance(s) in UEFA Europa Conference League)	0	—		2	0
Anderlecht	Total		10	0	0	0	—		1	0	—		11	0
Copenhagen (loan)	2020–21	Danish Superliga	14	1	—		—		—		—		14	1
AGF (loan)	2021–22	Danish Superliga	22	3	1	0	—		—		—		23	3
Andorra (loan)	2022–23	Segunda División	28	3	1	0	—		—		2 (Note: Appearance(s) in Copa Catalunya)	0	31	3
Plymouth Argyle	2023–24	Championship	27	3	1	0	—		—		—		28	3
Plymouth Argyle	2024–25	Championship	37	10	3	0	2	1	—		0	0	42	11
Plymouth Argyle	Total		64	13	4	0	2	1	—		0	0	70	14
Hannover 96	2025–26	2. Bundesliga	2	0	0	0	—		—		0	0	2	0
Career total			259	56	14	4	2	1	1	0	13	7	289	68

=== International ===
As of match played 20 March 2025

Appearances and goals by national team and year
National team	Year	Apps	Goals
Sierra Leone	2019	3	0
Sierra Leone	2020	2	1
Sierra Leone	2021	2	0
Sierra Leone	2022	4	0
Sierra Leone	2023	3	2
Sierra Leone	2024	7	0
Sierra Leone	2025	1	1
Total		22	4

Sierra Leone score listed first, score column indicates score after each Bundu goal

List of international goals scored by Mustapha Bundu
No.	Date	Venue	Cap	Opponent	Score	Result	Competition
1	13 November 2020	Samuel Ogbemudia Stadium, Benin City, Nigeria	4	Nigeria	3–4	4–4	2021 Africa Cup of Nations qualification
2	22 March 2023	Stade Adrar, Agadir, Morocco	12	São Tomé and Príncipe	1–1	2–2	2023 Africa Cup of Nations qualification
3	18 June 2023	Samuel Kanyon Doe Sports Complex, Paynesville, Liberia	14	Nigeria	1–2	2–3	2023 Africa Cup of Nations qualification
4	20 March 2025	Samuel Kanyon Doe Sports Complex, Paynesville, Liberia	22	Guinea-Bissau	1–0	3–1	2026 FIFA World Cup qualification

== Honours ==
Individual

- Superliga Player of the Month: September 2019
