= Brooklyn Ezeh =

German footballer (born 2001)

Personal information
- Full name: Brooklyn Kevin Ezeh
- Date of birth: 23 June 2001 (age 25)
- Place of birth: Hamburg, Germany
- Height: 1.88 m (6 ft 2 in)
- Position: Left-back

Team information
- Current team: Dynamo Dresden
- Number: 14

Youth career
- 2008–2019: Hamburger SV
- 2019–2020: Schalke 04

Senior career*
Years	Team	Apps	(Gls)
2020–2022	Schalke 04 II	42	(2)
2022	Viktoria Berlin	12	(2)
2022–2023	SV Wehen Wiesbaden	33	(2)
2023–2026	Hannover 96	23	(0)
2024–2026	Hannover 96 II	11	(0)
2026–	Dynamo Dresden	0	(0)
- * Club domestic league appearances and goals as of 1 July 2026

Brooklyn Kevin Ezeh (born 23 June 2001) is a German professional footballer who plays as a left-back for 2. Bundesliga club Dynamo Dresden.

== Career ==
Ezeh is a former youth academy player of Hamburger SV and Schalke 04. On 18 January 2022, he moved to 3. Liga club Viktoria Berlin. He made his professional debut on 22 January 2022 in a 2–0 league defeat against 1. FC Kaiserslautern.

In July 2022, Ezeh signed a two-year contract with SV Wehen Wiesbaden until June 2024.

In June 2023, Ezeh joined 2. Bundesliga side Hannover 96 on a three-year deal, with an option of a fourth.

On 10 June 2026, Ezeh signed with Dynamo Dresden.

== Personal life ==
Born in Germany, Ezeh is of Nigerian descent.
