= Kolja Oudenne =

Swedish professional footballer

Personal information
- Full name: Kolja Nuno Oudenne
- Date of birth: 11 November 2001 (age 25)
- Place of birth: Berlin, Germany
- Height: 1.83 m (6 ft 0 in)
- Position: Attacking midfielder

Team information
- Current team: Hannover 96
- Number: 29

Youth career
- 2006–2014: Internationale Berlin
- 2014–2015: Hertha BSC
- 2015–2018: Bayern Munich
- 2018–2020: Hertha Zehlendorf

Senior career*
Years	Team	Apps	(Gls)
2020–2021	Hertha Zehlendorf	8	(0)
2021–2022	Tasmania Berlin	34	(0)
2022–2023	VSG Altglienicke	33	(6)
2023–2025	Hannover 96 II	14	(6)
2023–	Hannover 96	52	(3)

International career
2017	Sweden U16	3	(0)
- * Club domestic league appearances and goals as of 18 May 2026

Kolja Nuno Oudenne (born 11 November 2001) is a professional footballer who plays as an attacking midfielder for Hannover 96. Born in Germany, he represented Sweden at youth level.

== Club career ==
Oudenne began his career at Internationale Berlin before playing in the youth team of Hertha BSC from 2014 to 2015 and in the youth team of Bayern Munich from 2015 to 2018. In 2018, he moved to Hertha Zehlendorf, where he played for 3 years. There he also made his first senior appearances in the NOFV-Oberliga. In the summer of 2021, he moved to Regionalliga Nordost club Tasmania Berlin. After his team was relegated, he stayed in the league and transferred to VSG Altglienicke.

In the summer of 2023, he moved to the second team of Hannover 96 in the Regionalliga Nord. On 17 September 2023, Oudenne also made his first professional appearance for the first team in the 2. Bundesliga, coming on as a substitute for Cedric Teuchert in the 75th minute. The home match against VfL Osnabrück ended in a 7–0 win, with Oudenne providing the assist for the final goal five minutes after his substitution.

== International career ==
Oudenne was born in Germany to a German father and Belgian-Swedish mother. In 2017, he played three matches for the Swedish national under-16 team.
