= Leon-Oumar Wechsel =

German footballer (born 2005)

Personal information
- Date of birth: 9 March 2005 (age 21)
- Place of birth: Osnabrück, Germany
- Height: 1.90 m (6 ft 3 in)
- Position: Goalkeeper

Team information
- Current team: Eintracht Trier
- Number: 1

Youth career
- SC Schölerberg
- –2020: Osnabrücker SC
- 2020–2021: Blau-Weiß Lohne
- 2021–2023: SV Rödinghausen
- 2023–2024: Hannover 96

Senior career*
Years	Team	Apps	(Gls)
2023	SV Rödinghausen	11	(0)
2023–	Hannover 96 II	23	(0)
2023–2026	Hannover 96	0	(0)
2025–2026	→ GKS Tychy (loan)	11	(0)
2026	→ Jahn Regensburg (loan)	1	(0)
2026–	Eintracht Trier	4	(0)

International career^{‡}
2024	Germany U19	1	(0)
2025	Germany U20	1	(0)
- * Club domestic league appearances and goals as of 24 September 2026 ‡ National team caps and goals as of 6 October 2025

Leon-Oumar Wechsel (born 9 March 2005) is a German professional footballer who plays as a goalkeeper for Regionalliga Südwest club Eintracht Trier.

== Club career ==
Wechsel is a product of the youth academies of the German clubs SC Schölerberg, Osnabrücker SC, Blau-Weiß Lohne and SV Rödinghausen. In 2023, he was promoted to Rödinghausen's senior team in the Regionalliga West. On 15 June 2023, he transferred to Hannover 96, where he was assigned to their reserves. He spent his first season with the club mainly playing for their under-19 team, while also making appearances for the reserves, helping them win the 2023–24 Regionalliga Nord. In the following season, he was promoted to act as the senior team's third goalkeeper, while regularly playing for the reserves in the 3. Liga. On 13 June 2025, he extended his contract with Hannover for one more season and joined the Polish I liga club GKS Tychy on a year-long loan. His loan was ended prematurely on 3 January 2026 and he was loaned out to Jahn Regensburg until the end of the season. He then moved to Eintracht Trier.

== International career ==
Wechsel was born in Germany to a Guinean father and Polish mother. In October 2025, he was called up to the Germany U21s for a set of 2027 UEFA European Under-21 Championship qualification matches.

== Honours ==
Hannover 96 II

- Regionalliga Nord: 2023–24
