= Lars Gindorf =

German footballer

Personal information
- Full name: Lars Timo Gindorf
- Date of birth: 13 August 2001 (age 25)
- Place of birth: Wadgassen, Germany
- Height: 1.81 m (5 ft 11 in)
- Position: Midfielder

Team information
- Current team: Hannover 96
- Number: 25

Youth career
- SSC Schaffhausen
- –2015: 1. FC Saarbrücken
- 2016–2017: FC Ingolstadt
- 2017–2019: SV Elversberg
- 2019–2020: SC Freiburg

Senior career*
Years	Team	Apps	(Gls)
2020–2021	SC Freiburg II	6	(1)
2021–2022	FC Memmingen	20	(6)
2022–2025	Hannover 96 II	54	(39)
2023–	Hannover 96	34	(3)
2025–2026	→ Alemannia Aachen (loan)	34	(28)
- * Club domestic league appearances and goals as of 1 July 2026

Lars Timo Gindorf (born 13 August 2001) is a German professional footballer who plays as a midfielder for 2. Bundesliga club Hannover 96.

== Career ==
Gindorf passed through the youth departments of 1. FC Saarbrücken, FC Ingolstadt, SV Elversberg and SC Freiburg. In the summer of 2021, he had to leave the club after SC Freiburg's under-23 team was promoted to the 3. Liga, as he did not receive a new contract. As a result, Gindorf was unemployed for two and a half months and received state benefits.

He then moved to FC Memmingen in the Regionalliga Bayern and, in the summer of 2022, to Hannover 96's Regionalliga team, where he played under coach Daniel Stendel. In the summer of 2023, he was briefly allowed to train with the professionals of Hannover 96, but was sent back to the second team. On 2 March 2024, Gindorf made his professional debut in the 2. Bundesliga against Fortuna Düsseldorf. He signed his first professional contract on 9 April 2024. On the 30th matchday of the 2023–24 season, Gindorf made his starting XI debut in the 2. Bundesliga and scored a goal in the match at Millerntor-Stadion against FC St. Pauli.

Gindorf was loaned out to Alemannia Aachen for the 2025–26 season.

== Honours ==
SC Freiburg II

- Regionalliga Südwest: 2020–21

Hannover 96 II

- Regionalliga Nord: 2023–24
