= List of German football transfers summer 2025 =

This is a list of German football transfers in the summer transfer window 2025 by club. Only transfers of the Bundesliga, and 2. Bundesliga are included.

== Bundesliga ==
Note: Flags indicate national team as has been defined under FIFA eligibility rules. Players may hold more than one non-FIFA nationality.

=== Bayern Munich ===
In:

| No. | Pos. | Nation | Player |
|---|---|---|---|
| 4 | DF | GER | Jonathan Tah (from Bayer Leverkusen) |
| 14 | FW | COL | Luis Díaz (from Liverpool) |
| 20 | MF | GER | Tom Bischof (from TSG Hoffenheim) |

Out:

| No. | Pos. | Nation | Player |
|---|---|---|---|
| 10 | FW | GER | Leroy Sané (to Galatasaray) |
| 11 | FW | FRA | Kingsley Coman (to Al-Nassr) |
| 15 | DF | ENG | Eric Dier (to Monaco) |
| 16 | MF | POR | João Palhinha (on loan to Tottenham Hotspur) |
| 18 | GK | ISR | Daniel Peretz (on loan to Hamburger SV) |
| 24 | MF | CRO | Gabriel Vidović (to Dinamo Zagreb) |
| 25 | FW | GER | Thomas Müller (to Vancouver Whitecaps) |
| 28 | DF | GER | Tarek Buchmann (on loan to 1. FC Nürnberg) |
| — | MF | GER | Arijon Ibrahimović (on loan to 1. FC Heidenheim, previously on loan at Lazio) |
| — | MF | CRO | Lovro Zvonarek (on loan to Grasshoppers, previously on loan at Sturm Graz) |
| — | MF | GER | Maurice Krattenmacher (on loan to Hertha BSC, previously on loan at SSV Ulm) |
| — | FW | ESP | Bryan Zaragoza (on loan to Celta Vigo, previously on loan at Osasuna) |
| — | DF | MAR | Adam Aznou (to Everton, previously on loan at Real Valladolid) |
| — | DF | GER | Frans Krätzig (to Red Bull Salzburg, previously on loan at 1. FC Heidenheim) |
| — | MF | GER | Paul Wanner (to PSV Eindhoven, previously on loan at 1. FC Heidenheim) |
| — | FW | FRA | Mathys Tel (to Tottenham Hotspur, previously on loan) |

=== Bayer Leverkusen ===
In:

| No. | Pos. | Nation | Player |
|---|---|---|---|
| 1 | GK | NED | Mark Flekken (from Brentford) |
| 4 | DF | ENG | Jarell Quansah (from Liverpool) |
| 5 | DF | FRA | Loïc Badé (from Sevilla) |
| 9 | MF | ARG | Claudio Echeverri (on loan from Manchester City) |
| 10 | MF | USA | Malik Tillman (from PSV Eindhoven) |
| 16 | DF | FRA | Axel Tape (from Paris Saint-Germain) |
| 17 | FW | GER | Farid Alfa-Ruprecht (from Manchester City) |
| 19 | FW | NED | Ernest Poku (from AZ) |
| 28 | GK | GER | Janis Blaswich (from RB Leipzig, previously on loan at Red Bull Salzburg) |
| 30 | MF | ALG | Ibrahim Maza (from Hertha BSC) |
| 35 | FW | CMR | Christian Kofane (from Albacete) |
| — | DF | SEN | Abdoulaye Faye (from Häcken) |
| — | DF | GER | Tim Oermann (from VfL Bochum) |

Out:

| No. | Pos. | Nation | Player |
|---|---|---|---|
| 1 | GK | FIN | Lukas Hradecky (to Monaco) |
| 4 | DF | GER | Jonathan Tah (to Bayern Munich) |
| 5 | DF | ESP | Mario Hermoso (loan return to Roma) |
| 10 | MF | GER | Florian Wirtz (to Liverpool) |
| 16 | MF | ARG | Emiliano Buendía (loan return to Aston Villa) |
| 17 | GK | CZE | Matěj Kovář (on loan to PSV Eindhoven) |
| 21 | MF | MAR | Amine Adli (to Bournemouth) |
| 23 | DF | FRA | Nordi Mukiele (loan return to Paris Saint-Germain) |
| 29 | FW | UKR | Artem Stepanov (on loan to 1. FC Nürnberg) |
| 30 | DF | NED | Jeremie Frimpong (to Liverpool) |
| 34 | MF | SUI | Granit Xhaka (to Sunderland) |
| 40 | MF | GER | Francis Onyeka (on loan to VfL Bochum) |
| 48 | GK | GER | Luca Novodomsky (to TSV Solingen) |
| — | DF | SEN | Abdoulaye Faye (on loan to Lorient) |
| — | DF | GER | Tim Oermann (on loan to Sturm Graz) |
| — | DF | CIV | Odilon Kossounou (to Atalanta, previously on loan) |
| — | MF | COL | Gustavo Puerta (to Hull City, previously on loan) |

=== Eintracht Frankfurt ===
In:

| No. | Pos. | Nation | Player |
|---|---|---|---|
| 9 | FW | GER | Jonathan Burkardt (from Mainz 05) |
| 13 | DF | DEN | Rasmus Kristensen (from Leeds United, previously on loan) |
| 20 | FW | JPN | Ritsu Dōan (from SC Freiburg) |
| 23 | GK | GER | Michael Zetterer (from Werder Bremen) |

Out:

| No. | Pos. | Nation | Player |
|---|---|---|---|
| 1 | GK | GER | Kevin Trapp (to Paris FC) |
| 9 | FW | CRO | Igor Matanović (to SC Freiburg) |
| 11 | FW | FRA | Hugo Ekitike (to Liverpool) |
| 23 | MF | HUN | Krisztián Lisztes (on loan to Ferencváros) |
| 35 | DF | BRA | Tuta (to Al-Duhail) |
| — | MF | USA | Paxten Aaronson (to Colorado Rapids, previously on loan at Utrecht) |
| — | FW | ESP | Nacho Ferri (to Westerlo, previously on loan at Kortrijk) |

=== Borussia Dortmund ===
In:

| No. | Pos. | Nation | Player |
|---|---|---|---|
| 2 | DF | BRA | Yan Couto (from Manchester City, previously on loan) |
| 7 | MF | ENG | Jobe Bellingham (from Sunderland) |
| 24 | DF | SWE | Daniel Svensson (from Nordsjælland, previously on loan) |
| 30 | GK | GER | Patrick Drewes (from VfL Bochum) |

Out:

| No. | Pos. | Nation | Player |
|---|---|---|---|
| 17 | MF | ENG | Carney Chukwuemeka (loan return to Chelsea) |
| 21 | MF | USA | Giovanni Reyna (to Borussia Mönchengladbach) |
| 35 | GK | POL | Marcel Lotka (to Fortuna Düsseldorf) |
| 38 | MF | GER | Kjell Wätjen (on loan to VfL Bochum) |
| 43 | FW | ENG | Jamie Gittens (to Chelsea) |
| — | GK | GER | Diant Ramaj (on loan to 1. FC Heidenheim, previously on loan at Copenhagen) |
| — | DF | FRA | Soumaïla Coulibaly (to Strasbourg, previously on loan at Brest) |
| — | FW | CIV | Sébastien Haller (to Utrecht, previously on loan) |
| — | FW | GER | Youssoufa Moukoko (to Copenhagen, previously on loan at Nice) |

=== SC Freiburg ===
In:

| No. | Pos. | Nation | Player |
|---|---|---|---|
| 5 | DF | GER | Anthony Jung (from Werder Bremen) |
| 7 | FW | GER | Derry Scherhant (from Hertha BSC) |
| 14 | MF | JPN | Yuito Suzuki (from Brøndby) |
| 22 | FW | BFA | Cyriaque Irié (from Troyes) |
| 29 | DF | GER | Philipp Treu (from FC St. Pauli) |
| 31 | FW | CRO | Igor Matanović (from Eintracht Frankfurt) |

Out:

| No. | Pos. | Nation | Player |
|---|---|---|---|
| 5 | DF | GER | Manuel Gulde (retired) |
| 22 | DF | FRA | Kiliann Sildillia (to PSV Eindhoven) |
| 23 | MF | KOS | Florent Muslija (on loan to Fortuna Düsseldorf) |
| 38 | FW | AUT | Michael Gregoritsch (to Brøndby) |
| 42 | FW | JPN | Ritsu Dōan (to Eintracht Frankfurt) |
| — | MF | GER | Robert Wagner (on loan to Holstein Kiel, previously on loan at FC St. Pauli) |
| — | DF | GER | Kenneth Schmidt (to Fortuna Düsseldorf, previously on loan at Hannover 96) |

=== Mainz 05 ===
In:

| No. | Pos. | Nation | Player |
|---|---|---|---|
| 17 | FW | GER | Benedict Hollerbach (from Union Berlin) |
| 18 | DF | AUS | Kasey Bos (from Melbourne Victory) |
| 23 | DF | AUT | Konstantin Schopp (from Sturm Graz II) |
| 24 | MF | JPN | Sōta Kawasaki (on loan from Kyoto Sanga) |

Out:

| No. | Pos. | Nation | Player |
|---|---|---|---|
| 3 | DF | GER | Moritz Jenz (loan return to VfL Wolfsburg) |
| 14 | MF | KOR | Hong Hyun-seok (on loan to Nantes) |
| 29 | FW | GER | Jonathan Burkardt (to Eintracht Frankfurt) |
| — | MF | GER | Tom Krauß (on loan to 1. FC Köln, previously on loan at VfL Bochum) |
| — | MF | GER | Marco Richter (on loan to Darmstadt 98, previously on loan at Hamburger SV) |
| — | MF | BIH | Dominik Peštić (to BFC Dynamo) |
| — | MF | SUI | Edimilson Fernandes (to Young Boys, previously on loan at Brest) |
| — | FW | FRA | Ludovic Ajorque (to Brest, previously on loan) |

=== RB Leipzig ===
In:

| No. | Pos. | Nation | Player |
|---|---|---|---|
| 6 | MF | NED | Ezechiel Banzuzi (from OH Leuven) |
| 9 | FW | BEL | Johan Bakayoko (from PSV Eindhoven) |
| 18 | MF | BEL | Arthur Vermeeren (from Atlético Madrid, previously on loan) |
| 19 | DF | SRB | Kosta Nedeljković (on loan from Aston Villa) |
| 33 | MF | SRB | Andrija Maksimović (from Red Star Belgrade) |
| 35 | DF | GER | Max Finkgräfe (from 1. FC Köln) |
| 40 | FW | BRA | Rômulo (from Göztepe) |
| 49 | FW | CIV | Yan Diomande (from Leganés) |

Out:

| No. | Pos. | Nation | Player |
|---|---|---|---|
| 9 | FW | DEN | Yussuf Poulsen (to Hamburger SV) |
| 21 | DF | SRB | Kosta Nedeljković (loan return to Aston Villa) |
| 30 | FW | SLO | Benjamin Šeško (to Manchester United) |
| 45 | DF | NOR | Jonathan Norbye (on loan to Arminia Bielefeld) |
| — | GK | GER | Timo Schlieck (on loan to Greuther Fürth, previously on loan at RSCA Futures) |
| — | DF | GER | Frederik Jäkel (on loan to Eintracht Braunschweig, previously on loan at SV Elversberg) |
| — | FW | CZE | Yannick Eduardo (on loan to Dordrecht, previously on loan at Emmen) |
| — | GK | GER | Janis Blaswich (to Bayer Leverkusen, previously on loan at Red Bull Salzburg) |
| — | DF | GER | Tim Köhler (to VfB Stuttgart II, previously on loan at SC Verl) |
| — | MF | GER | Nuha Jatta (to VfB Stuttgart II, previously on loan at Torino Primavera) |
| — | MF | GUI | Ilaix Moriba (to Celta Vigo, previously on loan) |
| — | FW | POR | André Silva (to Elche, previously on loan at Werder Bremen) |

=== Werder Bremen ===
In:

| No. | Pos. | Nation | Player |
|---|---|---|---|
| 7 | FW | BEL | Samuel Mbangula (from Juventus) |
| 39 | DF | AUT | Maximilian Wöber (on loan from Leeds United) |
| — | GK | EST | Karl Hein (on loan from Arsenal, previously on loan at Valladolid) |

Out:

| No. | Pos. | Nation | Player |
|---|---|---|---|
| 1 | GK | GER | Michael Zetterer (to Eintracht Frankfurt) |
| 3 | DF | GER | Anthony Jung (to SC Freiburg) |
| 7 | FW | GER | Marvin Ducksch (to Birmingham City) |
| 9 | FW | POR | André Silva (loan return to RB Leipzig) |
| 13 | DF | SRB | Miloš Veljković (to Red Star Belgrade) |
| 15 | FW | SCO | Oliver Burke (to Union Berlin) |
| 19 | DF | GER | Derrick Köhn (loan return to Galatasaray) |
| 29 | DF | BFA | Issa Kaboré (loan return to Manchester City) |
| 33 | FW | GER | Abdenego Nankishi (to VfB Stuttgart II) |
| — | FW | POL | Dawid Kownacki (on loan to Hertha BSC, previously on loan at Fortuna Düsseldorf) |

=== VfB Stuttgart ===
In:

| No. | Pos. | Nation | Player |
|---|---|---|---|
| 8 | FW | POR | Tiago Tomás (from VfL Wolfsburg) |
| 19 | MF | GER | Noah Darvich (from Barcelona B) |
| 22 | DF | FRA | Lorenz Assignon (from Rennes) |
| 30 | MF | ESP | Chema Andrés (from Real Madrid B) |
| 45 | FW | SRB | Lazar Jovanović (from Red Star Belgrade, previously on loan at OFK Beograd) |

Out:

| No. | Pos. | Nation | Player |
|---|---|---|---|
| 8 | MF | FRA | Enzo Millot (to Al-Ahli) |
| 10 | FW | MLI | El Bilal Touré (loan return to Atalanta) |
| 25 | MF | DEN | Jacob Bruun Larsen (to Burnley) |
| 32 | MF | SUI | Fabian Rieder (loan return to Rennes) |
| 40 | FW | GER | Luca Raimund (to Fortuna Düsseldorf) |
| 41 | GK | GER | Dennis Seimen (on loan to SC Paderborn) |
| 45 | DF | JPN | Anrie Chase (to Red Bull Salzburg) |
| — | MF | KOR | Jeong Woo-yeong (to Union Berlin, previously on loan) |
| — | FW | COL | Juan José Perea (to Zürich, previously on loan) |
| — | FW | GER | Luca Pfeiffer (to SV Elversberg, previously on loan at Karlsruher SC) |

=== Borussia Mönchengladbach ===
In:

| No. | Pos. | Nation | Player |
|---|---|---|---|
| 4 | DF | IDN | Kevin Diks (from Copenhagen) |
| 13 | MF | USA | Giovanni Reyna (from Borussia Dortmund) |
| 15 | FW | BIH | Haris Tabaković (on loan from TSG Hoffenheim) |
| 17 | MF | KOR | Jens Castrop (from 1. FC Nürnberg) |
| 18 | FW | JPN | Shūto Machino (from Holstein Kiel) |

Out:

| No. | Pos. | Nation | Player |
|---|---|---|---|
| 3 | DF | JPN | Ko Itakura (to Ajax) |
| 13 | FW | JPN | Shiō Fukuda (on loan to Karlsruher SC) |
| 14 | FW | FRA | Alassane Pléa (to PSV Eindhoven) |
| 22 | DF | AUT | Stefan Lainer (to Red Bull Salzburg) |
| 23 | FW | CRO | Noah Pesch (on loan to 1. FC Magdeburg) |
| 31 | FW | CZE | Tomáš Čvančara (on loan to Antalyaspor) |
| 38 | MF | LUX | Yvandro Borges Sanches (to Heracles Almelo) |

=== VfL Wolfsburg ===
In:

| No. | Pos. | Nation | Player |
|---|---|---|---|
| 3 | DF | SVK | Denis Vavro (from Copenhagen, previously on loan) |
| 5 | MF | BRA | Vinícius Souza (from Sheffield United) |
| 9 | FW | ALG | Mohamed Amoura (from Union SG, previously on loan) |
| 19 | MF | DEN | Jesper Lindstrøm (on loan from Napoli, previously on loan at Everton) |
| 24 | MF | DEN | Christian Eriksen (from Manchester United) |
| 25 | DF | GER | Aaron Zehnter (from SC Paderborn) |
| 30 | GK | POL | Jakub Zieliński (from Legia Warsaw) |

Out:

| No. | Pos. | Nation | Player |
|---|---|---|---|
| 3 | DF | BEL | Sebastiaan Bornauw (to Leeds United) |
| 5 | DF | DEN | Mads Roerslev (loan return to Brentford) |
| 6 | MF | BEL | Aster Vranckx (on loan to Sassuolo) |
| 10 | FW | GER | Lukas Nmecha (to Leeds United) |
| 11 | FW | POR | Tiago Tomás (to VfB Stuttgart) |
| 14 | FW | POL | Bartosz Białek (to Darmstadt 98) |
| 16 | MF | POL | Jakub Kamiński (on loan to 1. FC Köln) |
| 17 | FW | GER | Kevin Behrens (to Lugano) |
| 30 | GK | GER | Niklas Klinger (to Blau-Weiß Rühen) |
| — | MF | CRO | Bartol Franjić (on loan to Venezia, previously on loan at Dinamo Zagreb) |
| — | GK | GER | Philipp Schulze (to SC Verl, previously on loan) |
| — | DF | SUI | Cédric Zesiger (to FC Augsburg, previously on loan) |
| — | DF | GER | Manuel Braun (to Hannover 96 II, previously on loan at Waldhof Mannheim) |
| — | MF | POR | David Leal Costa (to FC Augsburg II) |
| — | MF | GER | Kofi Amoako (to Dynamo Dresden, previously on loan at VfL Osnabrück) |

=== FC Augsburg ===
In:

| No. | Pos. | Nation | Player |
|---|---|---|---|
| 4 | MF | FRA | Han-Noah Massengo (from Burnley, previously on loan at Auxerre) |
| 5 | DF | FRA | Chrislain Matsima (from AS Monaco, previously on loan) |
| 16 | DF | SUI | Cédric Zesiger (from VfL Wolfsburg, previously on loan) |
| 19 | MF | GER | Robin Fellhauer (from SV Elversberg) |
| 26 | FW | TUN | Elias Saad (from FC St. Pauli) |
| 29 | FW | FRA | Kyliane Dong (from Troyes) |
| 43 | DF | AUT | Oliver Sorg (from Sturm Graz II) |
| — | FW | COD | Nathanaël Mbuku (from Dinamo Zagreb) |

Out:

| No. | Pos. | Nation | Player |
|---|---|---|---|
| 2 | DF | POL | Robert Gumny (to Lech Poznań) |
| 4 | DF | ENG | Reece Oxford (free agent) |
| 19 | MF | NGR | Frank Onyeka (loan return to Brentford) |
| 24 | MF | FIN | Fredrik Jensen (to Aris Thesaloniki) |
| 37 | FW | GER | Mërgim Berisha (loan return to TSG Hoffenheim) |
| 44 | MF | GER | Henri Koudossou (on loan to 1. FC Nürnberg) |
| — | FW | COD | Nathanaël Mbuku (on loan to Montpellier) |
| — | GK | POL | Marcel Łubik (on loan to Górnik Zabrze, previously on loan at GKS Tychy) |
| — | DF | CRO | David Čolina (on loan to Osijek, previously on loan at Vejle) |
| — | DF | GER | Felix Uduokhai (to Beşiktaş, previously on loan) |
| — | DF | GER | Lasse Günther (to SV Elversberg, previously on loan at Karlsruher SC) |
| — | DF | GHA | Patric Pfeiffer (to Darmstadt 98, previously on loan at 1. FC Magdeburg) |
| — | FW | FRA | Irvin Cardona (to Saint-Étienne, previously on loan) |
| — | FW | CRO | Dion Drena Beljo (to Dinamo Zagreb, previously on loan at Rapid Wien) |

=== Union Berlin ===
In:

| No. | Pos. | Nation | Player |
|---|---|---|---|
| 7 | FW | SCO | Oliver Burke (from Werder Bremen) |
| 10 | FW | GER | Ilyas Ansah (from SC Paderborn) |
| 11 | MF | KOR | Jeong Woo-yeong (from VfB Stuttgart, previously on loan) |
| 23 | FW | SRB | Andrej Ilić (from Lille, previously on loan) |
| 30 | FW | UKR | Dmytro Bohdanov (from Dynamo Dresden) |
| 31 | GK | GER | Matheo Raab (from Hamburger SV) |
| 34 | DF | FRA | Stanley Nsoki (on loan from TSG Hoffenheim) |
| 39 | DF | GER | Derrick Köhn (from Galatasaray, previously on loan at Werder Bremen) |

Out:

| No. | Pos. | Nation | Player |
|---|---|---|---|
| 2 | DF | GER | Kevin Vogt (to VfL Bochum) |
| 9 | FW | CRO | Ivan Prtajin (to 1. FC Kaiserslautern) |
| 10 | FW | GER | Kevin Volland (to 1860 Munich) |
| 16 | FW | GER | Benedict Hollerbach (to Mainz 05) |
| 20 | MF | SVK | László Bénes (on loan to Kayserispor) |
| 26 | DF | GLP | Jérôme Roussillon (free agent) |
| 37 | GK | GER | Alexander Schwolow (free agent) |
| — | GK | GER | Lennart Grill (to Dynamo Dresden, previously on loan at Greuther Fürth) |
| — | DF | GER | Robin Gosens (to Fiorentina, previously on loan) |
| — | DF | GER | Paul Jaeckel (to Preußen Münster, previously on loan at Eintracht Braunschweig) |

=== FC St. Pauli ===
In:

| No. | Pos. | Nation | Player |
|---|---|---|---|
| 11 | DF | POL | Arkadiusz Pyrka (from Piast Gliwice) |
| 16 | MF | JPN | Joel Chima Fujita (from Sint-Truiden) |
| 23 | DF | GER | Louis Oppie (from Arminia Bielefeld) |
| 26 | FW | ENG | Ricky-Jade Jones (from Peterborough United) |
| 27 | FW | BEN | Andréas Hountondji (on loan from Burnley, previously on loan at Standard Liège) |
| 28 | MF | POR | Mathias Pereira Lage (from Brest) |
| 30 | GK | AUT | Simon Spari (from Austria Klagenfurt) |
| 34 | DF | AUT | Jannik Robatsch (from Austria Klagenfurt) |

Out:

| No. | Pos. | Nation | Player |
|---|---|---|---|
| 11 | FW | GER | Johannes Eggestein (to Austria Wien) |
| 13 | MF | GER | Noah Weißhaupt (loan return to SC Freiburg) |
| 16 | MF | GER | Carlo Boukhalfa (to St. Gallen) |
| 19 | FW | DEN | Andreas Albers (free agent) |
| 23 | DF | GER | Philipp Treu (to SC Freiburg) |
| 26 | FW | TUN | Elias Saad (to FC Augsburg) |
| 27 | FW | GER | Simon Zoller (retired) |
| 28 | GK | GER | Sören Ahlers (retired) |
| 29 | FW | GUI | Morgan Guilavogui (loan return to Lens) |
| 30 | GK | GER | Sascha Burchert (retired) |
| 32 | GK | GER | Eric Oelschlägel (free agent) |
| 39 | MF | GER | Robert Wagner (loan return to SC Freiburg) |
| 44 | DF | BEL | Siebe Van der Heyden (loan return to Mallorca) |
| — | FW | BRA | Maurides (to Radomiak Radom, previously on loan at Debrecen) |

=== TSG Hoffenheim ===
In:

| No. | Pos. | Nation | Player |
|---|---|---|---|
| 7 | MF | SUI | Leon Avdullahu (from Basel) |
| 13 | DF | BRA | Bernardo (from VfL Bochum) |
| 18 | MF | NED | Wouter Burger (from Stoke City) |
| 19 | FW | GER | Tim Lemperle (from 1. FC Köln) |
| 28 | DF | JPN | Kōki Machida (from Union SG) |
| 34 | DF | CZE | Vladimír Coufal (from West Ham United) |

Out:

| No. | Pos. | Nation | Player |
|---|---|---|---|
| 3 | DF | CZE | Pavel Kadeřábek (to Sparta Prague) |
| 4 | DF | NOR | Leo Østigård (loan return to Rennes) |
| 7 | MF | GER | Tom Bischof (to Bayern Munich) |
| 13 | DF | GER | Christopher Lenz (to Fortuna Düsseldorf) |
| 16 | MF | GER | Anton Stach (to Leeds United) |
| 18 | MF | MLI | Diadie Samassékou (free agent) |
| 19 | DF | CZE | David Jurásek (loan return to Benfica) |
| 21 | FW | GER | Marius Bülter (to 1. FC Köln) |
| 26 | FW | BIH | Haris Tabaković (on loan to Borussia Mönchengladbach) |
| 28 | MF | AUT | Florian Micheler (on loan to Arminia Bielefeld) |
| 32 | GK | DEN | Jakob Busk (loan return to Sønderjyske) |
| 34 | DF | FRA | Stanley Nsoki (on loan to Union Berlin) |
| 53 | FW | TUR | Erencan Yardımcı (to Eintracht Braunschweig) |
| — | GK | GER | Nahuel Noll (on loan to Hannover 96, previously on loan at Greuther Fürth) |
| — | DF | HUN | Attila Szalai (on loan to Kasımpaşa, previously on loan at Standard Liège) |
| — | FW | GER | Bambasé Conté (on loan to SV Elversberg, previously on loan at Karlsruher SC) |
| — | DF | GER | Joshua Quarshie (to Southampton, previously on loan at Greuther Fürth) |
| — | MF | FIN | Luka Hyryläinen (to 1. FC Magdeburg, previously on loan at SSV Ulm) |

=== 1. FC Heidenheim ===
In:

| No. | Pos. | Nation | Player |
|---|---|---|---|
| 22 | MF | GER | Arijon Ibrahimović (on loan from Bayern Munich, previously on loan at Lazio) |
| 41 | GK | GER | Diant Ramaj (on loan from Borussia Dortmund, previously on loan at Copenhagen) |

Out:

| No. | Pos. | Nation | Player |
|---|---|---|---|
| 10 | MF | GER | Paul Wanner (loan return to Bayern Munich) |
| 13 | DF | GER | Frans Krätzig (loan return to Bayern Munich) |
| 22 | GK | GER | Vitus Eicher (free agent) |
| 25 | FW | GER | Christopher Negele (to SpVgg Unterhaching) |
| 30 | MF | GER | Norman Theuerkauf (retired) |

=== 1. FC Köln ===
In:

| No. | Pos. | Nation | Player |
|---|---|---|---|
| 5 | MF | GER | Tom Krauß (on loan from Mainz 05, previously on loan at VfL Bochum) |
| 9 | FW | GER | Ragnar Ache (from 1. FC Kaiserslautern) |
| 16 | MF | POL | Jakub Kamiński (on loan from VfL Wolfsburg) |
| 18 | MF | ISL | Ísak Bergmann Jóhannesson (from Fortuna Düsseldorf) |
| 20 | GK | GER | Ron-Robert Zieler (from Hannover 96) |
| 28 | DF | NOR | Sebastian Sebulonsen (from Brøndby) |
| 30 | FW | GER | Marius Bülter (from TSG Hoffenheim) |
| 32 | DF | USA | Kristoffer Lund (on loan from Palermo) |
| 33 | DF | NED | Rav van den Berg (from Middlesbrough) |
| 39 | DF | TUR | Cenk Özkacar (on loan from Valencia, previously on loan at Valladolid) |

Out:

| No. | Pos. | Nation | Player |
|---|---|---|---|
| 7 | MF | AUT | Dejan Ljubičić (to Dinamo Zagreb) |
| 12 | GK | GER | Jonas Nickisch (to 1. FC Saarbrücken) |
| 13 | FW | GER | Mark Uth (retired) |
| 16 | MF | GER | Marvin Obuz (to Rot-Weiss Essen) |
| 19 | FW | GER | Tim Lemperle (to TSG Hoffenheim) |
| 20 | GK | GER | Philipp Pentke (free agent) |
| 21 | FW | GER | Steffen Tigges (to SC Paderborn) |
| 26 | GK | SUI | Anthony Racioppi (loan return to Hull City) |
| 35 | DF | GER | Max Finkgräfe (to RB Leipzig) |
| 42 | FW | USA | Damion Downs (to Southampton) |
| 43 | FW | SLO | Jaka Čuber Potočnik (on loan to Rot-Weiss Essen) |
| 47 | MF | LUX | Mathias Olesen (to Greuther Fürth) |
| — | DF | DEN | Rasmus Carstensen (on loan to AGF, previously on loan at Lech Poznań) |

=== Hamburger SV ===
In:

| No. | Pos. | Nation | Player |
|---|---|---|---|
| 14 | FW | FRA | Rayan Philippe (from Eintracht Braunschweig) |
| 15 | FW | DEN | Yussuf Poulsen (from RB Leipzig) |
| 16 | DF | GEO | Giorgi Gocholeishvili (on loan from Shakhtar Donetsk, previously on loan at Copenhagen) |
| 17 | DF | COM | Warmed Omari (on loan from Rennes, previously on loan at Lyon) |
| 21 | MF | GER | Nicolai Remberg (from Holstein Kiel) |
| 24 | MF | ARG | Nicolás Capaldo (from Red Bull Salzburg) |
| 25 | DF | NGR | Jordan Torunarigha (from Gent) |
| 26 | GK | ISR | Daniel Peretz (on loan from Bayern Munich) |
| 41 | GK | GER | Fernando Dickes (from RB Leipzig youth) |

Out:

| No. | Pos. | Nation | Player |
|---|---|---|---|
| 4 | DF | GER | Sebastian Schonlau (to Vancouver Whitecaps) |
| 6 | MF | POL | Łukasz Poręba (on loan to SV Elversberg) |
| 12 | GK | GER | Tom Mickel (retired) |
| 14 | MF | NED | Ludovit Reis (to Club Brugge) |
| 16 | FW | SCO | Adedire Mebude (loan return to Westerlo) |
| 17 | MF | CZE | Adam Karabec (loan return to Sparta Prague) |
| 19 | GK | GER | Matheo Raab (to Union Berlin) |
| 20 | MF | GER | Marco Richter (loan return to Mainz 05) |
| 27 | FW | GER | Davie Selke (to İstanbul Başakşehir) |
| 37 | DF | KOS | Valon Zumberi (to Vitesse) |
| 47 | DF | GER | Nicolas Oliveira (to Jahn Regensburg) |
| — | MF | FIN | Anssi Suhonen (on loan to Öster, previously on loan at Jahn Regensburg) |
| — | DF | FRA | Lucas Perrin (to Sporting Gijón, previously on loan at Cercle Brugge) |
| — | FW | GER | Tom Sanne (to Wacker Burghausen, previously on loan at Dordrecht) |
| — | FW | HUN | András Németh (to Puskás Akadémia, previously on loan at Preußen Münster) |

== 2. Bundesliga ==
Note: Flags indicate national team as has been defined under FIFA eligibility rules. Players may hold more than one non-FIFA nationality.

=== Holstein Kiel ===
In:

| No. | Pos. | Nation | Player |
|---|---|---|---|
| 10 | MF | NOR | Jonas Therkelsen (from Strømsgodset) |
| 15 | MF | DEN | Kasper Davidsen (from AaB) |
| 17 | DF | BIH | Mladen Cvjetinović (from FC Ingolstadt) |
| 21 | GK | GER | Jonas Krumrey (from Red Bull Salzburg, previously on loan at Lyngby) |
| 22 | MF | AUT | Stefan Schwab (from PAOK) |
| 25 | FW | GER | Marcus Müller (from VfL Osnabrück) |
| 39 | MF | GER | Robert Wagner (on loan from SC Freiburg, previously on loan at FC St. Pauli) |
| 40 | DF | KOS | Leon Parduzi (from FC Ingolstadt youth) |
| 44 | MF | GER | Luca Prasse (from SV Meppen) |
| 45 | FW | GER | Louis Köster (from Hansa Rostock, previously on loan) |
| 48 | MF | KOS | Hamza Muqaj (from Carl Zeiss Jena) |
| — | FW | SVK | Adrián Kaprálik (from Žilina) |

Out:

| No. | Pos. | Nation | Player |
|---|---|---|---|
| 8 | MF | GER | Finn Porath (to Schalke 04) |
| 9 | FW | AUT | Benedikt Pichler (to Hannover 96) |
| 10 | MF | GER | Lewis Holtby (to NAC Breda) |
| 14 | DF | GER | Max Geschwill (on loan to 1. FC Magdeburg) |
| 15 | MF | GER | Marvin Schulz (to Preußen Münster) |
| 17 | DF | GER | Timo Becker (to Schalke 04) |
| 18 | FW | JPN | Shūto Machino (to Borussia Mönchengladbach) |
| 20 | FW | GER | Fiete Arp (to OB) |
| 21 | GK | GER | Thomas Dähne (to 1860 Munich) |
| 22 | MF | GER | Nicolai Remberg (to Hamburger SV) |
| 33 | DF | SVK | Dominik Javorček (loan return to Žilina) |
| 34 | DF | GER | Colin Kleine-Bekel (to VfL Bochum) |
| 37 | MF | BIH | Armin Gigović (to Young Boys) |
| — | MF | GER | Jonas Sterner (to Hannover 96, previously on loan at Dynamo Dresden) |

=== VfL Bochum ===
In:

| No. | Pos. | Nation | Player |
|---|---|---|---|
| 3 | DF | GER | Philipp Strompf (from SSV Ulm) |
| 5 | DF | GER | Colin Kleine-Bekel (from Holstein Kiel) |
| 7 | DF | GER | Kevin Vogt (from Union Berlin) |
| 8 | MF | GER | Kjell Wätjen (on loan from Borussia Dortmund) |
| 9 | FW | MLI | Ibrahim Sissoko (from Saint-Étienne) |
| 14 | FW | FRA | Mathis Clairicia (from LB Châteauroux) |
| 21 | MF | GER | Francis Onyeka (on loan from Bayer Leverkusen) |
| 26 | DF | GER | Romario Rösch (from SSV Ulm) |
| 39 | DF | GER | Leandro Morgalla (on loan from Red Bull Salzburg) |

Out:

| No. | Pos. | Nation | Player |
|---|---|---|---|
| 2 | DF | CRC | Cristian Gamboa (retired) |
| 5 | DF | BRA | Bernardo (to TSG Hoffenheim) |
| 8 | MF | FRA | Anthony Losilla (retired) |
| 9 | FW | NED | Myron Boadu (loan return to Monaco) |
| 10 | MF | NED | Dani de Wit (to Utrecht) |
| 11 | FW | GRE | Georgios Masouras (loan return to Olympiacos) |
| 13 | DF | CRO | Jakov Medić (loan return to Ajax) |
| 14 | DF | GER | Tim Oermann (to Bayer Leverkusen) |
| 17 | MF | GER | Tom Krauß (loan return to Mainz 05) |
| 20 | DF | UKR | Ivan Ordets (free agent) |
| 25 | DF | EGY | Mohammed Tolba (free agent) |
| 27 | GK | GER | Patrick Drewes (to Borussia Dortmund) |
| 29 | FW | GER | Moritz Broschinski (to Basel) |
| 34 | GK | GER | Paul Grave (to 1. FC Bocholt) |
| — | MF | GER | Lukas Daschner (to St. Gallen, previously on loan) |
| — | MF | MKD | Agon Elezi (to Sarajevo, previously on loan at Gorica) |

=== SV Elversberg ===
In:

| No. | Pos. | Nation | Player |
|---|---|---|---|
| 2 | DF | THA | Nicholas Mickelson (from OB) |
| 4 | DF | GER | Luis Seifert (from Hamburger SV II) |
| 6 | MF | GER | Amara Condé (from Heerenveen) |
| 8 | MF | POL | Łukasz Poręba (on loan from Hamburger SV) |
| 10 | FW | GER | Bambasé Conté (on loan from TSG Hoffenheim, previously on loan at Karlsruher SC) |
| 11 | MF | GER | Jason Ceka (from 1. FC Magdeburg) |
| 14 | MF | GER | Jarzinho Malanga (on loan from VfB Stuttgart II) |
| 16 | FW | GER | Luca Pfeiffer (from VfB Stuttgart, previously on loan at Karlsruher SC) |
| 21 | DF | GER | Lasse Günther (from FC Augsburg, previously on loan at Karlsruher SC) |
| 30 | DF | GER | Jan Gyamerah (from 1. FC Kaiserslautern) |
| 43 | DF | GER | Felix Keidel (from FC Ingolstadt) |

Out:

| No. | Pos. | Nation | Player |
|---|---|---|---|
| 2 | DF | GER | Elias Baum (loan return to Eintracht Frankfurt) |
| 5 | DF | GER | Frederik Jäkel (loan return to RB Leipzig) |
| 6 | MF | GER | Robin Fellhauer (to FC Augsburg) |
| 8 | MF | GER | Semih Şahin (to 1. FC Kaiserslautern) |
| 10 | FW | KOS | Fisnik Asllani (loan return to TSG Hoffenheim) |
| 11 | MF | GER | Luca Dürholtz (to 1. FC Köln II) |
| 21 | MF | GER | Paul Stock (to Hansa Rostock) |
| 26 | DF | GER | Arne Sicker (free agent) |
| 30 | MF | GER | Muhammed Damar (loan return to TSG Hoffenheim) |
| 33 | DF | GER | Maurice Neubauer (to Hannover 96) |

=== SC Paderborn ===
In:

| No. | Pos. | Nation | Player |
|---|---|---|---|
| 2 | DF | GER | Ruben Müller (from SC Freiburg II) |
| 9 | MF | GER | Nick Bätzner (from Wehen Wiesbaden) |
| 18 | FW | GER | Marco Wörner (from SC Freiburg II) |
| 27 | FW | GER | Steffen Tigges (from 1. FC Köln) |
| 28 | FW | GER | Lucas Copado (from LASK, previously on loan at Energie Cottbus) |
| 30 | FW | GER | Stefano Marino (from Hannover 96 II) |
| 38 | MF | GER | Bennit Bröger (from VfL Wolfsburg youth) |
| 41 | GK | GER | Dennis Seimen (on loan from VfB Stuttgart) |

Out:

| No. | Pos. | Nation | Player |
|---|---|---|---|
| 6 | MF | GER | Marvin Mehlem (loan return to Hull City) |
| 19 | MF | GER | Luca Herrmann (to Dynamo Dresden) |
| 24 | MF | FIN | Casper Terho (loan return to Union SG) |
| 29 | FW | GER | Ilyas Ansah (to Union Berlin) |
| 32 | DF | GER | Aaron Zehnter (to VfL Wolfsburg) |
| 35 | GK | GER | Arne Schulz (to Viktoria Köln) |
| 36 | FW | GER | Felix Platte (free agent) |
| 38 | DF | GER | Tristan Zobel (on loan to Erzgebirge Aue) |
| 43 | DF | GER | Martin Ens (to SC Verl) |
| — | FW | NED | Koen Kostons (to PEC Zwolle, previously on loan at Kortrijk) |

=== 1. FC Magdeburg ===
In:

| No. | Pos. | Nation | Player |
|---|---|---|---|
| 8 | MF | GER | Laurin Ulrich (on loan from VfB Stuttgart II) |
| 10 | FW | CRO | Noah Pesch (on loan from Borussia Mönchengladbach) |
| 20 | MF | GER | Nick Meier (from Hannover 96 II) |
| 28 | DF | GER | Max Geschwill (on loan from Holstein Kiel) |
| 29 | MF | FRA | Rayan Ghrieb (from Guingamp) |
| 38 | MF | FIN | Luka Hyryläinen (from TSG Hoffenheim, previously on loan at SSV Ulm) |
| 39 | FW | GUI | Kandet Diawara (from Le Havre, previously on loan at Pau FC) |

Out:

| No. | Pos. | Nation | Player |
|---|---|---|---|
| 3 | DF | GHA | Patric Pfeiffer (loan return to FC Augsburg) |
| 8 | FW | CPV | Bryan Teixeira (loan return to Sturm Graz) |
| 10 | MF | GER | Jason Ceka (to SV Elversberg) |
| 11 | FW | MAR | Mohamed El Hankouri (to Standard Liège) |
| 20 | FW | ENG | Xavier Amaechi (to Plymouth Argyle) |
| 22 | DF | TOG | Pierre Nadjombe (on loan to Alemannia Aachen) |
| 29 | MF | TUR | Livan Burcu (loan return to Union Berlin) |

=== Fortuna Düsseldorf ===
In:

| No. | Pos. | Nation | Player |
|---|---|---|---|
| 1 | GK | POL | Marcel Lotka (from Borussia Dortmund) |
| 3 | DF | GER | Christopher Lenz (from TSG Hoffenheim) |
| 4 | DF | GER | Kenneth Schmidt (from SC Freiburg, previously on loan at Hannover 96) |
| 7 | FW | GER | Luca Raimund (from VfB Stuttgart) |
| 8 | MF | MAR | Anouar El Azzouzi (from PEC Zwolle) |
| 10 | FW | DEN | Christian Rasmussen (from Ajax) |
| 11 | FW | GER | Julian Hettwer (from Borussia Dortmund II) |
| 13 | FW | SUI | Cedric Itten (from Young Boys) |
| 14 | MF | GRE | Sotiris Alexandropoulos (on loan from Sporting CP, previously on loan at Standard Liège) |
| 24 | MF | KOS | Florent Muslija (on loan from SC Freiburg) |

Out:

| No. | Pos. | Nation | Player |
|---|---|---|---|
| 1 | GK | GER | Robert Kwasigroch (loan return to Hertha BSC) |
| 3 | DF | GER | André Hoffmann (free agent) |
| 7 | FW | GER | Dženan Pejčinović (loan return to VfL Wolfsburg) |
| 8 | MF | ISL | Ísak Bergmann Jóhannesson (to 1. FC Köln) |
| 9 | FW | NED | Vincent Vermeij (to Dynamo Dresden) |
| 10 | FW | NED | Myron van Brederode (loan return to AZ) |
| 11 | MF | GER | Moritz Kwarteng (loan return to VfL Bochum) |
| 20 | DF | GER | Jamil Siebert (to Lecce) |
| 24 | FW | POL | Dawid Kownacki (loan return to Werder Bremen) |
| 31 | MF | GER | Marcel Sobottka (free agent) |
| 34 | DF | FRA | Nicolas Gavory (to Eupen) |
| 35 | MF | GER | Daniel Bunk (to Clemson Tigers) |
| — | GK | GER | Ben Zich (on loan to Roda JC) |

=== 1. FC Kaiserslautern ===
In:

| No. | Pos. | Nation | Player |
|---|---|---|---|
| 2 | DF | GER | Simon Asta (from Greuther Fürth) |
| 4 | DF | GER | Maxwell Gyamfi (from VfL Osnabrück) |
| 5 | DF | KOR | Kim Ji-soo (on loan from Brentford) |
| 6 | MF | GER | Fabian Kunze (from Hannover 96) |
| 8 | MF | GER | Semih Şahin (from SV Elversberg) |
| 9 | FW | CRO | Ivan Prtajin (from Union Berlin) |
| 10 | FW | AZE | Mahir Emreli (from 1. FC Nürnberg) |
| 15 | MF | FIN | Naatan Skyttä (from Dunkerque) |

Out:

| No. | Pos. | Nation | Player |
|---|---|---|---|
| 5 | DF | GER | Maximilian Bauer (loan return to FC Augsburg) |
| 6 | DF | MLI | Almamy Touré (free agent) |
| 9 | FW | GER | Ragnar Ache (to 1. FC Köln) |
| 10 | MF | GER | Philipp Klement (free agent) |
| 16 | MF | GER | Tim Breithaupt (loan return to FC Augsburg) |
| 17 | FW | GER | Aaron Opoku (to Kayserispor) |
| 24 | DF | GER | Jannis Heuer (on loan to Preußen Münster) |
| 26 | MF | CZE | Filip Kaloč (to Ludogorets Razgrad) |
| 32 | DF | GER | Jan Gyamerah (to SV Elversberg) |
| 41 | MF | JPN | Daisuke Yokota (loan return to Gent) |
| 42 | FW | ARM | Grant-Leon Ranos (loan return to Borussia Mönchengladbach) |

=== Karlsruher SC ===
In:

| No. | Pos. | Nation | Player |
|---|---|---|---|
| 1 | GK | DEN | Hans Christian Bernat (from Botev Plovdiv) |
| 9 | FW | CRO | Roko Šimić (on loan from Cardiff City, previously on loan at Kortrijk) |
| 13 | FW | JPN | Shiō Fukuda (on loan from Borussia Mönchengladbach) |
| 15 | DF | GER | Paul Scholl (on loan from Bayern Munich II) |
| 16 | MF | GER | Andreas Müller (from Darmstadt 98) |
| 29 | DF | GER | Niclas Dühring (from FC Ingolstadt) |

Out:

| No. | Pos. | Nation | Player |
|---|---|---|---|
| 1 | GK | GER | Max Weiß (to Burnley) |
| 5 | MF | GER | Robin Heußer (to Eintracht Braunschweig) |
| 6 | MF | GER | Leon Jensen (to Hertha BSC) |
| 9 | FW | SUI | Andrin Hunziker (loan return to Basel) |
| 14 | FW | DEN | Mikkel Kaufmann (loan return to 1. FC Heidenheim) |
| 16 | FW | GER | Luca Pfeiffer (loan return to VfB Stuttgart) |
| 26 | DF | GER | Benedikt Bauer (to Jahn Regensburg) |
| 29 | DF | GER | Lasse Günther (loan return to FC Augsburg) |
| 31 | FW | GER | Bambasé Conté (loan return to TSG Hoffenheim) |
| 32 | DF | GER | Robin Bormuth (to 1. FC Saarbrücken) |
| 33 | GK | KOS | Mustafë Abdullahu (loan return to Tirana) |
| — | MF | TUR | Eren Öztürk (to 1. FC Lokomotive Leipzig, previously on loan at VSG Altglienicke) |

=== Hannover 96 ===
In:

| No. | Pos. | Nation | Player |
|---|---|---|---|
| 1 | GK | GER | Nahuel Noll (on loan from TSG Hoffenheim, previously on loan at Greuther Fürth) |
| 4 | DF | GER | Hendry Blank (on loan from Red Bull Salzburg) |
| 5 | DF | ROU | Virgil Ghiță (from Cracovia) |
| 6 | DF | POL | Maik Nawrocki (on loan from Celtic) |
| 7 | FW | SLE | Mustapha Bundu (from Plymouth Argyle) |
| 9 | FW | FIN | Benjamin Källman (from Cracovia) |
| 11 | FW | AUT | Benedikt Pichler (from Holstein Kiel) |
| 13 | MF | GER | Franz Roggow (from Borussia Dortmund II) |
| 17 | DF | GER | Bastian Allgeier (from SSV Ulm) |
| 18 | MF | JPN | Daisuke Yokota (on loan from Gent, previously on loan at 1. FC Kaiserslautern) |
| 19 | DF | FRA | William Kokolo (from Laval) |
| 20 | DF | RSA | Ime Okon (from SuperSport United) |
| 26 | MF | FRA | Waniss Taïbi (from Rodez) |
| 27 | DF | JPN | Hayate Matsuda (from Mito HollyHock, previously on loan) |
| 32 | MF | GER | Jonas Sterner (from Holstein Kiel, previously on loan at Dynamo Dresden) |
| 33 | DF | GER | Maurice Neubauer (from SV Elversberg) |

Out:

| No. | Pos. | Nation | Player |
|---|---|---|---|
| 1 | GK | GER | Ron-Robert Zieler (to 1. FC Köln) |
| 2 | DF | ENG | Josh Knight (to Portsmouth) |
| 4 | DF | GER | Kenneth Schmidt (loan return to SC Freiburg) |
| 5 | DF | GER | Phil Neumann (to Birmingham City) |
| 6 | MF | GER | Fabian Kunze (to 1. FC Kaiserslautern) |
| 7 | FW | GER | Jessic Ngankam (loan return to Eintracht Frankfurt) |
| 9 | FW | GER | Nicolò Tresoldi (to Club Brugge) |
| 11 | MF | KOR | Lee Hyun-ju (loan return to Bayern Munich II) |
| 13 | MF | GER | Max Christiansen (to 1860 Munich) |
| 17 | DF | POL | Bartłomiej Wdowik (loan return to Braga) |
| 20 | DF | GER | Jannik Dehm (to Greuther Fürth) |
| 21 | DF | JPN | Sei Muroya (to FC Tokyo) |
| 21 | MF | GER | Marius Wörl (to Arminia Bielefeld, previously on loan) |
| 23 | DF | GER | Marcel Halstenberg (to Germania Grasdorf) |
| 25 | MF | GER | Lars Gindorf (on loan to Alemannia Aachen) |
| 32 | FW | GER | Andreas Voglsammer (to Hansa Rostock) |
| 35 | GK | GER | Leon-Oumar Wechsel (on loan to GKS Tychy) |
| 38 | FW | GER | Thaddäus-Monju Momuluh (to Arminia Bielefeld) |
| 40 | FW | WAL | Rabbi Matondo (loan return to Rangers) |

=== 1. FC Nürnberg ===
In:

| No. | Pos. | Nation | Player |
|---|---|---|---|
| 5 | MF | GER | Tom Baack (from SC Verl) |
| 7 | FW | MTQ | Mickaël Biron (from RWDM Brussels) |
| 8 | MF | GER | Henri Koudossou (on loan from FC Augsburg) |
| 9 | FW | GER | Semir Telalović (from SSV Ulm) |
| 11 | FW | UKR | Artem Stepanov (on loan from Bayer Leverkusen) |
| 13 | GK | POL | Robin Lisewski (from Borussia Dortmund youth) |
| 17 | MF | MAR | Ayoub Chaikhoun (from Eintracht Frankfurt youth) |
| 23 | FW | ITA | Mohamed Alì Zoma (from AlbinoLeffe) |
| 24 | DF | GEO | Luka Lochoshvili (from Cremonese, previously on loan at Salernitana) |
| 27 | MF | GER | Justin von der Hitz (from 1. FC Köln youth) |
| 28 | DF | GER | Tarek Buchmann (on loan from Bayern Munich) |
| 36 | DF | CRO | Kristian Mandić (from Eintracht Frankfurt youth) |
| 37 | FW | CGO | Noah Maboulou (from Rennes B) |

Out:

| No. | Pos. | Nation | Player |
|---|---|---|---|
| 2 | DF | DEN | Oliver Villadsen (to Brøndby) |
| 5 | DF | GER | Tim Drexler (loan return to TSG Hoffenheim) |
| 9 | FW | GRE | Stefanos Tzimas (loan return to Brighton & Hove Albion) |
| 17 | MF | KOR | Jens Castrop (to Borussia Mönchengladbach) |
| 22 | DF | GER | Enrico Valentini (retired) |
| 23 | FW | GER | Janni Serra (loan return to AGF) |
| 28 | FW | FRA | Janis Antiste (loan return to Sassuolo) |
| 30 | FW | AZE | Mahir Emreli (to 1. FC Kaiserslautern) |
| 33 | DF | GER | Nick Seidel (on loan to Jahn Regensburg) |
| 34 | FW | GER | Dustin Forkel (on loan to Jahn Regensburg) |
| 36 | FW | GER | Lukas Schleimer (to Wehen Wiesbaden) |
| 39 | GK | GER | Nicolas Ortegel (on loan to BFC Dynamo) |
| — | DF | GER | Jannik Hofmann (on loan to Rot-Weiss Essen, previously on loan at VfB Stuttgart II) |
| — | DF | ESP | Iván Márquez (to Fortuna Sittard, previously on loan at NEC) |
| — | DF | GER | Jannes Horn (to Rapid Wien, previously on loan at St. Louis City) |
| — | MF | MAR | Ali Loune (to RWDM Brussels, previously on loan at Erzgebirge Aue) |
| — | FW | GER | Christoph Daferner (to Dynamo Dresden, previously on loan) |
| — | FW | GER | Manuel Wintzheimer (to 1. FC Schweinfurt, previously on loan at Rot-Weiss Essen) |

=== Hertha BSC ===
In:

| No. | Pos. | Nation | Player |
|---|---|---|---|
| 5 | MF | GER | Leon Jensen (from Karlsruher SC) |
| 9 | FW | POL | Dawid Kownacki (on loan from Werder Bremen, previously on loan at Fortuna Düsseldorf) |
| 13 | GK | GER | Konstantin Heide (from SpVgg Unterhaching) |
| 14 | MF | GER | Maurice Krattenmacher (on loan from Bayern Munich, previously on loan at SSV Ulm) |
| 17 | FW | DEN | Sebastian Grønning (from FC Ingolstadt) |
| 27 | DF | GER | Niklas Kolbe (from SSV Ulm) |
| 30 | MF | GER | Paul Seguin (from Schalke 04) |

Out:

| No. | Pos. | Nation | Player |
|---|---|---|---|
| 5 | MF | GRE | Andreas Bouchalakis (free agent) |
| 7 | FW | GER | Florian Niederlechner (to 1860 Munich) |
| 9 | FW | BIH | Smail Prevljak (to Istra 1961) |
| 10 | MF | ALG | Ibrahim Maza (to Bayer Leverkusen) |
| 16 | DF | ENG | Jonjoe Kenny (to PAOK) |
| 19 | DF | TUN | Jeremy Dudziak (free agent) |
| 20 | FW | HUN | Palkó Dárdai (to Puskás Akadémia) |
| 39 | FW | GER | Derry Scherhant (to SC Freiburg) |
| — | GK | GER | Robert Kwasigroch (to Al-Markhiya, previously on loan at Fortuna Düsseldorf) |
| — | MF | ENG | Bradley Ibrahim (to Plymouth Argyle, previously on loan at Crawley Town) |
| — | FW | FRA | Kélian Nsona (to Casa Pia, previously on loan at Emmen) |

=== Darmstadt 98 ===
In:

| No. | Pos. | Nation | Player |
|---|---|---|---|
| 3 | DF | RUS | Leon Klassen (from Lyngby) |
| 6 | DF | GHA | Patric Pfeiffer (from FC Augsburg, previously on loan at 1. FC Magdeburg) |
| 16 | MF | JPN | Hiroki Akiyama (on loan from Albirex Niigata) |
| 22 | FW | GER | Serhat-Semih Güler (from Viktoria Köln) |
| 23 | MF | GER | Marco Richter (on loan from Mainz 05, previously on loan at Hamburger SV) |
| 24 | GK | GER | Benedikt Börner (from VfL Wolfsburg youth) |
| 27 | FW | POL | Bartosz Białek (from VfL Wolfsburg) |
| 44 | FW | JPN | Yosuke Furukawa (from Júbilo Iwata, previously on loan at Górnik Zabrze) |

Out:

| No. | Pos. | Nation | Player |
|---|---|---|---|
| 3 | DF | ESP | Guille Bueno (loan return to Borussia Dortmund II) |
| 4 | DF | GER | Christoph Zimmermann (free agent) |
| 11 | MF | GER | Tobias Kempe (free agent) |
| 13 | DF | GER | Marco Thiede (to Anagennisi Karditsa) |
| 16 | MF | GER | Andreas Müller (to Karlsruher SC) |
| 18 | MF | GER | Philipp Förster (free agent) |
| 29 | FW | SWE | Oscar Vilhelmsson (to Preußen Münster) |
| 44 | MF | POL | Nico Baier (to GKS Tychy) |
| 49 | DF | ISR | Asaf Arania (to Ashdod) |
| — | FW | GER | Fabio Torsiello (on loan to Alemannia Aachen, previously on loan at SpVgg Unterhaching) |
| — | GK | POL | Karol Niemczycki (to Ashdod, previously on loan) |
| — | FW | SUI | Filip Stojilković (to Cracovia, previously on loan at OFK Beograd) |

=== Greuther Fürth ===
In:

| No. | Pos. | Nation | Player |
|---|---|---|---|
| 2 | DF | GER | Lukas Reich (from 1860 Munich) |
| 4 | DF | GER | Philipp Ziereis (from LASK) |
| 8 | MF | LUX | Mathias Olesen (from 1. FC Köln) |
| 16 | FW | SUI | Aaron Keller (from SpVgg Unterhaching, previously on loan at SSV Ulm) |
| 17 | DF | GER | Noah König (from TSG Hoffenheim II) |
| 18 | FW | GER | Felix Higl (from SSV Ulm) |
| 21 | GK | GER | Timo Schlieck (on loan from RB Leipzig, previously on loan at RSCA Futures) |
| 22 | MF | URU | Juan Ignacio Cabrera (from FC Augsburg II) |
| 23 | DF | GER | Jannik Dehm (from Hannover 96) |
| 25 | DF | ISL | Brynjar Ingi Bjarnason (from HamKam) |
| 26 | GK | NED | Pelle Boevink (from FC Ingolstadt) |
| 31 | GK | GER | Sebastian Jung (from Babelsberg 03) |
| 42 | FW | GER | Omar Sillah (from Hamburger SV II) |

Out:

| No. | Pos. | Nation | Player |
|---|---|---|---|
| 2 | DF | GER | Simon Asta (to 1. FC Kaiserslautern) |
| 11 | MF | GER | Roberto Massimo (to Górnik Zabrze) |
| 15 | DF | GER | Joshua Quarshie (loan return to TSG Hoffenheim) |
| 17 | DF | GER | Niko Gießelmann (free agent) |
| 18 | DF | GER | Marco Meyerhöfer (to Preußen Münster) |
| 21 | DF | GER | Kerim Çalhanoğlu (free agent) |
| 22 | FW | SRB | Nemanja Motika (loan return to Olimpija Ljubljana) |
| 23 | DF | GER | Gideon Jung (to Kayserispor) |
| 25 | DF | SUI | Noah Loosli (loan return to VfL Bochum) |
| 28 | FW | GER | Jannik Mause (loan return to 1. FC Kaiserslautern) |
| 31 | GK | GER | Lennart Grill (loan return to Union Berlin) |
| 34 | MF | GER | Denis Pfaffenrot (to SV Sandhausen) |
| 36 | MF | GER | Philipp Müller (on loan to Jahn Regensburg) |
| 42 | GK | GER | Moritz Schulze (free agent) |
| 44 | GK | GER | Nahuel Noll (loan return to TSG Hoffenheim) |
| — | DF | GER | Matti Wagner (on loan to Alemannia Aachen, previously on loan at Rot-Weiss Essen) |
| — | FW | GER | Leander Popp (on loan to Viktoria Köln, previously on loan at SpVgg Unterhaching) |

=== Schalke 04 ===
In:

| No. | Pos. | Nation | Player |
|---|---|---|---|
| 4 | DF | TUR | Hasan Kuruçay (from OH Leuven) |
| 5 | DF | GER | Timo Becker (from Holstein Kiel) |
| 23 | MF | GER | Soufiane El-Faouzi (from Alemannia Aachen) |
| 25 | DF | BIH | Nikola Katić (from Zürich, previously on loan at Plymouth Argyle) |
| — | MF | GER | Finn Porath (from Holstein Kiel) |

Out:

| No. | Pos. | Nation | Player |
|---|---|---|---|
| 5 | DF | ENG | Derry Murkin (to Utrecht) |
| 7 | MF | GER | Paul Seguin (to Hertha BSC) |
| 23 | MF | TUR | Mehmet-Can Aydın (to Eintracht Braunschweig) |
| 25 | MF | MAR | Aymen Barkok (free agent) |
| 29 | MF | GER | Tobias Mohr (to Standard Liège) |
| 31 | DF | GER | Taylan Bulut (to Beşiktaş) |
| 34 | GK | AUT | Michael Langer (retired) |
| 35 | DF | POL | Marcin Kamiński (to Wisła Płock) |
| 36 | DF | GER | Niklas Barthel (to FC Gütersloh) |
| — | GK | GER | Ralf Fährmann (free agent) |
| — | MF | GER | Dominick Drexler (retired) |
| — | DF | CMR | Steve Noode (on loan to Union Titus Pétange, previously on loan at SCR Altach) |
| — | GK | GER | Ron-Thorben Hoffmann (to Eintracht Braunschweig, previously on loan) |
| — | DF | GER | Emmanuel Gyamfi (to Aberdeen, previously on loan at VVV-Venlo) |
| — | MF | GER | Lino Tempelmann (to Eintracht Braunschweig, previously on loan) |

=== Preußen Münster ===
In:

| No. | Pos. | Nation | Player |
|---|---|---|---|
| 3 | DF | GER | Paul Jaeckel (from Union Berlin, previously on loan at Eintracht Braunschweig) |
| 4 | DF | CRO | Antonio Tikvić (from Watford, previously on loan at Grazer AK) |
| 6 | MF | GER | Marcel Benger (from SC Verl) |
| 10 | MF | GER | Marvin Schulz (from Holstein Kiel) |
| 11 | FW | SWE | Oscar Vilhelmsson (from Darmstadt 98) |
| 13 | FW | GER | Lars Lokotsch (from SC Verl) |
| 17 | MF | GER | Oliver Batista Meier (from SSV Ulm) |
| 22 | DF | GER | Jannis Heuer (on loan from 1. FC Kaiserslautern) |
| 28 | DF | GER | Marco Meyerhöfer (from Greuther Fürth) |

Out:

| No. | Pos. | Nation | Player |
|---|---|---|---|
| 4 | MF | GER | David Kinsombi (loan return to SC Paderborn) |
| 7 | MF | GER | Daniel Kyerewaa (to Reading) |
| 10 | MF | POL | Sebastian Mrowca (free agent) |
| 11 | MF | GER | Thorben Deters (from SV Meppen) |
| 13 | MF | GER | Florian Pick (to 1. FC Saarbrücken) |
| 18 | MF | GER | Marc Lorenz (free agent) |
| 22 | DF | GER | Dominik Schad (free agent) |
| 28 | FW | HUN | András Németh (loan return to Hamburger SV) |
| 29 | DF | GER | Lukas Frenkert (to Eintracht Braunschweig) |
| 31 | FW | ISL | Hólmbert Friðjónsson (to Gwangju FC) |
| 32 | MF | GER | Luca Bazzoli (to Rot-Weiss Essen) |

=== Eintracht Braunschweig ===
In:

| No. | Pos. | Nation | Player |
|---|---|---|---|
| 1 | GK | GER | Ron-Thorben Hoffmann (from Schalke 04, previously on loan) |
| 5 | DF | GER | Frederik Jäkel (on loan from RB Leipzig, previously on loan at SV Elversberg) |
| 8 | MF | TUR | Mehmet-Can Aydın (from Schalke 04) |
| 9 | FW | TUR | Erencan Yardımcı (from TSG Hoffenheim) |
| 13 | GK | ALB | Elhan Kastrati (from Cittadella) |
| 16 | DF | GER | Louis Breunig (from Jahn Regensburg) |
| 20 | MF | GER | Lino Tempelmann (from Schalke 04, previously on loan) |
| 29 | DF | GER | Lukas Frenkert (from Preußen Münster) |
| 30 | MF | GER | Robin Heußer (from Karlsruher SC) |
| 33 | GK | SUI | Marko Rajkovačić (from Collina d'Oro) |

Out:

| No. | Pos. | Nation | Player |
|---|---|---|---|
| 3 | DF | GER | Paul Jaeckel (loan return to Union Berlin) |
| 4 | MF | GER | Jannis Nikolaou (to SC St. Tönis) |
| 5 | DF | FIN | Robert Ivanov (to Asteras Tripolis) |
| 6 | DF | BIH | Ermin Bičakčić (free agent) |
| 8 | MF | GER | Niklas Tauer (loan return to Mainz 05) |
| 9 | FW | FRA | Rayan Philippe (to Hamburger SV) |
| 12 | GK | SWE | Marko Johansson (free agent) |
| 13 | GK | AUT | Tino Casali (free agent) |
| 16 | MF | NED | Julian Baas (loan return to Sparta Rotterdam) |
| 28 | MF | GER | Jona Borsum (on loan to Kickers Offenbach) |
| 29 | FW | GER | Richmond Tachie (loan return to 1. FC Kaiserslautern) |
| 34 | GK | GER | Justin Duda (on loan to SG Barockstadt) |
| — | MF | GER | Karim Hüneburg (to Phönix Lübeck, previously on loan at Weiche Flensburg) |

=== Arminia Bielefeld ===
In:

| No. | Pos. | Nation | Player |
|---|---|---|---|
| 5 | DF | NOR | Jonathan Norbye (on loan from RB Leipzig) |
| 10 | MF | GER | Marvin Mehlem (from Hull City, previously on loan at SC Paderborn) |
| 14 | FW | GER | Thaddäus-Monju Momuluh (from Hannover 96) |
| 20 | MF | AUT | Florian Micheler (on loan from TSG Hoffenheim) |
| 27 | FW | GER | Benjamin Boakye (from VfB Stuttgart II) |
| 29 | DF | GER | Tim Handwerker (from Jahn Regensburg) |
| 38 | MF | GER | Marius Wörl (from Hannover 96, previously on loan) |

Out:

| No. | Pos. | Nation | Player |
|---|---|---|---|
| 4 | DF | GER | Louis Oppie (to FC St. Pauli) |
| 5 | DF | GER | Semi Belkahia (free agent) |
| 10 | MF | MAR | Nassim Boujellab (to TSV Havelse) |
| 17 | MF | GER | Merveille Biankadi (free agent) |
| 33 | DF | GER | Max Lippert (on loan to 1. FC Köln II) |
| — | FW | GER | André Becker (to SSV Ulm, previously on loan at Waldhof Mannheim) |

=== Dynamo Dresden ===
In:

| No. | Pos. | Nation | Player |
|---|---|---|---|
| 2 | DF | GER | Konrad Faber (on loan from St. Gallen) |
| 6 | MF | GER | Kofi Amoako (from VfL Wolfsburg, previously on loan at VfL Osnabrück) |
| 8 | MF | GER | Luca Herrmann (from SC Paderborn) |
| 9 | FW | NED | Vincent Vermeij (from Fortuna Düsseldorf) |
| 16 | FW | SWE | Nils Fröling (from Hansa Rostock) |
| 19 | DF | GER | Alexander Rossipal (from Hansa Rostock) |
| 22 | GK | GER | Lennart Grill (from Union Berlin, previously on loan at Greuther Fürth) |
| 33 | FW | GER | Christoph Daferner (from 1. FC Nürnberg, previously on loan) |
| — | FW | GER | Marlon Faß (from TSG Hoffenheim youth) |

Out:

| No. | Pos. | Nation | Player |
|---|---|---|---|
| 4 | DF | GER | Dennis Duah (on loan to Energie Cottbus) |
| 6 | MF | GER | Tom Berger (free agent) |
| 14 | DF | GER | Paul Lehmann (on loan to SC Verl) |
| 16 | DF | GER | Philip Heise (to VVV-Venlo) |
| 20 | DF | KOS | Andi Hoti (loan return to 1. FC Magdeburg) |
| 21 | FW | GER | Robin Meißner (on loan to VfL Osnabrück) |
| 22 | FW | GER | Mika Baur (loan return to SC Paderborn) |
| 31 | GK | GER | Phillip Böhm (to Austria Lustenau) |
| 32 | MF | GER | Jonas Sterner (loan return to Holstein Kiel) |
| 34 | FW | UKR | Dmytro Bohdanov (to Union Berlin) |
| — | FW | GER | Marlon Faß (on loan to Stuttgarter Kickers) |

== See also ==
- 2025–26 Bundesliga
- 2025–26 2. Bundesliga
