= 2024–25 Hannover 96 season =

Hannover 96
2024–25 season
- Manager: Stefan Leitl (until 29 December); André Breitenreiter (29 December – 23 April); Lars Barlemann, Dirk Lottner & Christian Schulz (interim, from 23 April)
- Stadium: Heinz von Heiden Arena
- 2. Bundesliga: 9th
- DFB-Pokal: First round
- Top goalscorer: League: Nicolò Tresoldi (7); All: Nicolò Tresoldi (7)
- Highest home attendance: 49,000; Hannover v Hamburg; Hannover v Schalke; Hannover v Hertha; Hannover v Köln
- Lowest home attendance: 25,600; Hannover v Ulm
- Average home league attendance: 38,300
- Biggest win: Magdeburg 0–3 Hannover
- Biggest defeat: Bielefeld 2–0 Hannover; Braunschweig 2–0 Hannover; Elversberg 3–1 Hannover; Hannover 1–3 Elversberg; Darmstadt 3–1 Hannover
Home colours	Away colours	Third colours

The 2024–25 Hannover 96 season was the 129th season in the football club's history and 29th overall and sixth consecutive season in the second flight of German football, the 2. Bundesliga. Hannover 96 also participated in this season's edition of the domestic cup, the DFB-Pokal. This was the 66th season for Hannover in the Heinz von Heiden Arena, located in Hanover, Lower Saxony, Germany.

== Players ==
=== Squad information ===
As of 4 February 2025

Note: Flags indicate national team as defined under FIFA eligibility rules; some limited exceptions apply. Players may hold more than one non-FIFA nationality.

No.	Pos.	Nation	Player
1	GK	GER	Ron-Robert Zieler (captain)
2	DF	ENG	Josh Knight
3	DF	GER	Boris Tomiak
4	DF	GER	Kenneth Schmidt (on loan from SC Freiburg)
5	DF	GER	Phil Neumann
6	MF	GER	Fabian Kunze
7	FW	GER	Jessic Ngankam (on loan from Eintracht Frankfurt)
8	MF	GER	Enzo Leopold
9	FW	GER	Nicolò Tresoldi
10	MF	GER	Jannik Rochelt
11	MF	KOR	Lee Hyun-ju (on loan from Bayern Munich II)
13	MF	GER	Max Christiansen
14	FW	LBN	Husseyn Chakroun
15	MF	GER	Noël Aséko Nkili (on loan from Bayern Munich II)
16	FW	NOR	Håvard Nielsen

No.	Pos.	Nation	Player
17	DF	POL	Bartłomiej Wdowik (on loan from Braga)
19	MF	GER	Eric Uhlmann
20	DF	GER	Jannik Dehm
21	DF	JPN	Sei Muroya
23	DF	GER	Marcel Halstenberg (vice-captain)
25	MF	GER	Lars Gindorf
28	MF	GER	Montell Ndikom
29	MF	SWE	Kolja Oudenne
30	GK	GER	Leo Weinkauf
32	FW	GER	Andreas Voglsammer
35	GK	GER	Leon-Oumar Wechsel
37	DF	GER	Brooklyn Ezeh
38	FW	GER	Thaddäus-Monju Momuluh
40	FW	WAL	Rabbi Matondo (on loan from Rangers)

=== Out on loan ===
Note: Flags indicate national team as defined under FIFA eligibility rules; some limited exceptions apply. Players may hold more than one non-FIFA nationality.

No.	Pos.	Nation	Player
39	MF	GER	Marius Wörl (on loan to Arminia Bielefeld until 30 June 2025)

=== Transfers ===
==== In ====
No.	Pos	Player	From	Type	Window	Ends	Fee	Source
2	DF	(England) Josh Knight	(England) Peterborough United	Transfer	Summer	30 June 2026	Free	
7	FW	(Germany) Jessic Ngankam	(Germany) Eintracht Frankfurt	Loan	Summer	30 June 2025	Free	
10	MF	(Germany) Jannik Rochelt	(Germany) SV Elversberg	Transfer	Summer	30 June 2027	€1,500,000	
11	MF	(South Korea) Lee Hyun-ju	(Germany) Bayern Munich II	Loan	Summer	30 June 2025	Free	
17	DF	(Poland) Bartłomiej Wdowik	(Portugal) Braga	Loan	Summer	30 June 2025	Free	
38	FW	(Germany) Thaddäus-Monju Momuluh	(Germany) Arminia Bielefeld	Return from loan	Summer	30 June 2026	–	
–	MF	(Germany) Max Besuschkow	Austria Klagenfurt	Return from loan	Summer	30 June 2025	–	
3	DF	(Germany) Boris Tomiak	(Germany) 1. FC Kaiserslautern	Transfer	Winter	30 June 2028	€300,000	
4	DF	(Germany) Kenneth Schmidt	(Germany) SC Freiburg	Loan	Winter	30 June 2026	Free	
15	MF	(Germany) Noël Aséko Nkili	(Germany) Bayern Munich II	Loan	Winter	30 June 2026	Free	
40	FW	(Wales) Rabbi Matondo	(Scotland) Rangers	Loan	Winter	30 June 2025	Free	

==== Out ====
No.	Pos	Player	To	Type	Window	Fee	Source
4	DF	(Germany) Bright Arrey-Mbi	(Portugal) Braga	Transfer	Summer	€6,200,000	
10	MF	(Germany) Sebastian Ernst	(Germany) Jahn Regensburg	End of contract	Summer	–	
11	MF	(Austria) Louis Schaub	(Austria) Rapid Wien	Transfer	Summer	€750,000	
17	MF	(Germany) Muhammed Damar	(Germany) TSG Hoffenheim	End of loan	Summer	–	
24	MF	(Cyprus) Antonio Foti	(Germany) Eintracht Frankfurt	End of loan	Summer	–	
31	DF	(Germany) Julian Börner	Free agent	Contract terminated	Summer	–	
34	DF	(Germany) Yannik Lührs	(Germany) Borussia Dortmund II	Transfer	Summer	€350,000	
36	FW	(Germany) Cedric Teuchert	(United States) St. Louis City SC	End of contract	Summer	–	
40	MF	(Germany) Christopher Scott	(Belgium) Antwerp	End of loan	Summer	–	
–	MF	(Germany) Max Besuschkow	(Germany) FC Ingolstadt	Transfer	Summer	Free	

== Friendly matches ==
Win Draw Loss

28 June 2024 Friendly	SC Hemmingen-Westerfeld	1–8	Hannover 96	Hemmingen
18:00 CEST (UTC+2)	Biehl 53' (pen.)	Report	Dehm 14', 24', 38'; Husser 37'; Ngankam 52'; Leopold 70' (pen.); Uhlmann 74'; Voglsammer 75'	Stadium: Sportgelände Hohe Bünte; Attendance: 1,496; Referee: Harm Osmers

29 June 2024 Friendly	SV Ramlingen/Ehlershausen	0–3	Hannover 96	Burgdorf
15:30 CEST (UTC+2)		Report	Voglsammer 21'; Tresoldi 37'; Gindorf 75'	Stadium: Wahrendorff-Arena; Attendance: 1,450; Referee: Alexander Roj

6 July 2024 Friendly	Hannover 96	2–1	SC Verl	Hanover
14:00 CEST (UTC+2)	Tresoldi 50'; Halstenberg 56'	Report	Steczyk 52'	Stadium: Eilenriedestadion; Attendance: 700; Referee: Konrad Oldhafer

13 July 2024 Friendly	Hannover 96	4–2	VfL Osnabrück	Hanover
13:00 CEST (UTC+2)	Tresoldi 65', 82'; Ngankam 95', 106'	Report	Wulff 37'; Mulaj 83'	Stadium: Eilenriedestadion; Attendance: 0 Referee: Timon Schulz
Note: The match lasted for 4×30 minutes.

20 July 2024 Friendly	Hannover 96	3–3	Twente	Leogang, Austria
14:00 CEST (UTC+2)	Tresoldi 36'; Muroya 48'; Ezeh 118'	Report	Vlap 21'; Kuster 56'; Ltaief 107'	Stadium: Steinbergstadion
Note: The match lasted for 4×30 minutes.

24 July 2024 Friendly	Hannover 96	1–4	Leeds United	Harsewinkel
15:30 CEST (UTC+2)	Gindorf 62'	Report	Gruev 7'; Piroe 27'; Joseph 51', 70'	Stadium: Hotel-Residence Klosterpforte; Attendance: 0 Referee: Henry Schröder

27 July 2024 Friendly	Hannover 96	3–2	VfL Wolfsburg	Hanover
15:30 CEST (UTC+2)	Halstenberg 8' (pen.); Tresoldi 47'; Ngankam 88'	Report	Kamiński 11'; Amoura 44'	Stadium: Eilenriedestadion; Attendance: 2,200; Referee: Lukas Benen

6 September 2024 Friendly	VfL Wolfsburg	2–1	Hannover 96	Wolfsburg
12:00 CEST (UTC+2)	Akaegbobi 5'; Behrens 57'	Report	Momuluh 81'	Attendance: 0

10 October 2024 Friendly	Hannover 96	3–2	FC St. Pauli	Hanover
12:00 CEST (UTC+2)	Voglsammer 38', 49'; Momuluh 55'	Report	Banks 29', 51'	Attendance: 0

14 November 2024 Friendly	Hannover 96	2–2	1. FC Magdeburg	Hanover
12:30 CET (UTC+1)	Voglsammer 45'; Ngankam 80'	Report	El Hankouri 15'; Nadjombe 21'	Stadium: Eilenriedestadion; Attendance: 0 Referee: Lennart Kernchen

6 January 2025 Friendly	Hannover 96	0–1	Waldhof Mannheim	Belek, Turkey
15:30 TRT (UTC+3)		Report	Halstenberg 23' (o.g.)	Stadium: Cornelia Sports Center

10 January 2025 Friendly	Hannover 96	0–3	1. FC Magdeburg	Belek, Turkey
12:00 TRT (UTC+3)		Report	Marušić 33'; Teixeira 37'; Krempicki 42'	Stadium: Cornelia Sports Center

10 January 2025 Friendly	Hannover 96	2–1	Young Boys	Belek, Turkey
14:00 TRT (UTC+3)	Gindorf 82'; Lee 86'	Report	Łakomy 81'	Stadium: Cornelia Sports Center

20 March 2025 Friendly	SC Paderborn	1–0	Hannover 96	Paderborn
13:00 CET (UTC+1)	Bilbija 39'	Report		Attendance: 0 Referee: Yannick Rupert

== Competitions ==
Win Draw Loss

=== Overview ===
Competition	First match	Last match	Starting round	Final position	Record							
Competition	First match	Last match	Starting round	Final position	Pld	W	D	L	GF	GA	GD	Win %
2. Bundesliga	3 August 2024	18 May 2025	Matchday 1	9th	34	13	12	9	41	36	+5	38.24
DFB-Pokal	17 August 2024	17 August 2024	First round	First round	1	0	0	1	0	2	−2	0.00
Total					35	13	12	10	41	38	+3	37.14

Source: Competitions

=== 2. Bundesliga ===
==== League table ====
Pos	Team	Pld	W	D	L	GF	GA	GD	Pts
7	1. FC Kaiserslautern	34	15	8	11	56	55	+1	53
8	Karlsruher SC	34	14	10	10	57	55	+2	52
9	Hannover 96	34	13	12	9	41	36	+5	51
10	1. FC Nürnberg	34	14	6	14	60	57	+3	48
11	Hertha BSC	34	12	8	14	49	51	−2	44

Source: Bundesliga
Rules for classification: 1) Points; 2) Goal difference; 3) Goals scored; 4) Head-to-head results; 5) Head-to-head away goals scored; 6) Away goals scored; 7) Play-off.
(Rules 4–6 only apply after home and away matches have been played between the tied teams.)

==== Results summary ====
Overall								Home						Away					
Pld	W	D	L	GF	GA	GD	Pts	W	D	L	GF	GA	GD	W	D	L	GF	GA	GD
34	13	12	9	41	36	+5	51	8	7	2	23	15	+8	5	5	7	18	21	−3

Source: DFB

==== Results by round ====
Round	1	2	3	4	5	6	7	8	9	10	11	12	13	14	15	16	17	18	19	20	21	22	23	24	25	26	27	28	29	30	31	32	33	34
Ground	H	A	H	A	H	A	H	A	H	A	H	A	H	A	H	A	H	A	H	A	H	A	H	A	H	A	H	A	H	A	H	A	H	A
Result	W	D	W	L	W	L	W	L	W	W	W	L	L	D	W	L	D	W	D	D	D	D	D	W	D	W	D	L	L	L	W	W	D	D
Position	3	4	3	9	5	6	4	6	6	2	1	1	4	4	3	5	7	4	5	6	7	8	8	8	7	6	6	8	9	10	9	8	8	9

Source: DFB
A = Away; H = Home; W = Win; D = Draw; L = Loss

==== Matches ====
3 August 2024 1	Hannover 96	2–0	Jahn Regensburg	Hanover
13:00 CEST (UTC+2)	Tresoldi 11'; Dehm 23'	Report		Stadium: Heinz von Heiden Arena; Attendance: 31,800; Referee: Michael Bacher

11 August 2024 2	Preußen Münster	0–0	Hannover 96	Münster
13:30 CEST (UTC+2)		Report		Stadium: Preußenstadion; Attendance: 12,422; Referee: Lars Erbst

23 August 2024 3	Hannover 96	1–0	Hamburger SV	Hanover
18:30 CEST (UTC+2)	Ngankam 49' (pen.)	Report		Stadium: Heinz von Heiden Arena; Attendance: 49,000; Referee: Patrick Alt

30 August 2024 4	Fortuna Düsseldorf	1–0	Hannover 96	Düsseldorf
18:30 CEST (UTC+2)	Schmidt 59'	Report		Stadium: Merkur Spiel-Arena; Attendance: 35,416; Referee: Florian Heft

14 September 2024 5	Hannover 96	3–1	1. FC Kaiserslautern	Hanover
13:00 CEST (UTC+2)	Lee 6'; Christiansen 73'; Momuluh 90+5'	Report	Ache 56'	Stadium: Heinz von Heiden Arena; Attendance: 38,100; Referee: Robert Kampka

20 September 2024 6	SC Paderborn	2–1	Hannover 96	Paderborn
18:30 CEST (UTC+2)	Kostons 9'; Ansah 77'	Report	Kostons 19' (o.g.)	Stadium: Home Deluxe Arena; Attendance: 15,000; Referee: Tom Bauer

29 September 2024 7	Hannover 96	2–0	1. FC Nürnberg	Hanover
13:30 CEST (UTC+2)	Halstenberg 79' (pen.); Momuluh 80'	Report		Stadium: Heinz von Heiden Arena; Attendance: 36,500; Referee: Eric Weisbach

6 October 2024 8	Eintracht Braunschweig	2–0	Hannover 96	Braunschweig
13:30 CEST (UTC+2)	Kaufmann 20'; Philippe 90+3' (pen.)	Report		Stadium: Eintracht-Stadion; Attendance: 19,919; Referee: Daniel Schlager

19 October 2024 9	Hannover 96	1–0	Schalke 04	Hanover
13:00 CEST (UTC+2)	Kunze 4'	Report		Stadium: Heinz von Heiden Arena; Attendance: 49,000; Referee: Eric Weisbach

27 October 2024 10	1. FC Magdeburg	0–3	Hannover 96	Magdeburg
13:30 CET (UTC+1)		Report	Voglsammer 13', 23'; Nielsen 75'	Stadium: Avnet Arena; Attendance: 27,065; Referee: Tobias Stieler

2 November 2024 11	Hannover 96	2–1	Karlsruher SC	Hanover
13:00 CET (UTC+1)	Ngankam 66'; Halstenberg 89' (pen.)	Report	Franke 45'	Stadium: Heinz von Heiden Arena; Attendance: 39,500; Referee: Richard Hempel

10 November 2024 12	SV Elversberg	3–1	Hannover 96	Spiesen-Elversberg
13:30 CET (UTC+1)	Baum 10'; Asllani 45+5'; Damar 48'	Report	Tresoldi 90+1'	Stadium: Waldstadion an der Kaiserlinde; Attendance: 9,337; Referee: Florian Lechner

23 November 2024 13	Hannover 96	1–2	Darmstadt 98	Hanover
13:00 CET (UTC+1)	Lee 68'	Report	Förster 62'; Nürnberger 72'	Stadium: Heinz von Heiden Arena; Attendance: 31,500; Referee: Michael Bacher

30 November 2024 14	1. FC Köln	2–2	Hannover 96	Cologne
13:00 CET (UTC+1)	Lemperle 48'; Downs 81'	Report	Ngankam 25'; Kainz 86' (o.g.)	Stadium: RheinEnergieStadion; Attendance: 50,000; Referee: Sören Storks

7 December 2024 15	Hannover 96	3–2	SSV Ulm	Hanover
13:00 CET (UTC+1)	Lee 60'; Tresoldi 71', 81'	Report	Telalović 23', 55'	Stadium: Heinz von Heiden Arena; Attendance: 25,600; Referee: Tom Bauer

15 December 2024 16	Greuther Fürth	1–0	Hannover 96	Fürth
13:30 CET (UTC+1)	Futkeu 83'	Report		Stadium: Sportpark Ronhof Thomas Sommer; Attendance: 12,334; Referee: Tobias Reichel

22 December 2024 17	Hannover 96	0–0	Hertha BSC	Hanover
13:30 CET (UTC+1)		Report		Stadium: Heinz von Heiden Arena; Attendance: 49,000; Referee: Daniel Schlager

17 January 2025 18	Jahn Regensburg	0–1	Hannover 96	Regensburg
18:30 CET (UTC+1)		Report	Ngankam 35'	Stadium: Jahnstadion Regensburg; Attendance: 11,310; Referee: Richard Hempel

26 January 2025 19	Hannover 96	2–2	Preußen Münster	Hanover
13:30 CET (UTC+1)	Tresoldi 34'; Leopold 64'	Report	Mees 21'; Pick 72'	Stadium: Heinz von Heiden Arena; Attendance: 36,100; Referee: Frank Willenborg

2 February 2025 20	Hamburger SV	2–2	Hannover 96	Hamburg
13:30 CET (UTC+1)	Hefti 15'; Dompé 84'	Report	Tresoldi 52'; Matondo 79'	Stadium: Volksparkstadion; Attendance: 57,000; Referee: Michael Bacher

9 February 2025 21	Hannover 96	1–1	Fortuna Düsseldorf	Hanover
13:30 CET (UTC+1)	Rochelt 35'	Report	Van Brederode 26'	Stadium: Heinz von Heiden Arena; Attendance: 33,200; Referee: Max Burda

15 February 2025 22	1. FC Kaiserslautern	0–0	Hannover 96	Kaiserslautern
13:00 CET (UTC+1)		Report		Stadium: Fritz-Walter-Stadion; Attendance: 45,779; Referee: Robert Kampka

22 February 2025 23	Hannover 96	1–1	SC Paderborn	Hanover
20:30 CET (UTC+1)	Halstenberg 4'	Report	Grimaldi 89'	Stadium: Heinz von Heiden Arena; Attendance: 36,200; Referee: Florian Lechner

1 March 2025 24	1. FC Nürnberg	1–2	Hannover 96	Nuremberg
13:00 CET (UTC+1)	Tzimas 36'	Report	Leopold 42'; Knight 57'	Stadium: Max-Morlock-Stadion; Attendance: 31,961; Referee: Tom Bauer

9 March 2025 25	Hannover 96	1–1	Eintracht Braunschweig	Hanover
13:30 CET (UTC+1)	Knight 90+3'	Report	Tempelmann 77'	Stadium: Heinz von Heiden Arena; Attendance: 32,100; Referee: Matthias Jöllenbeck

14 March 2025 26	Schalke 04	1–2	Hannover 96	Gelsenkirchen
18:30 CET (UTC+1)	Antwi-Adjei 27'	Report	Rochelt 87'; Nielsen 88'	Stadium: Veltins-Arena; Attendance: 62,077; Referee: Richard Hempel

29 March 2025 27	Hannover 96	0–0	1. FC Magdeburg	Hanover
13:00 CET (UTC+1)		Report		Stadium: Heinz von Heiden Arena; Attendance: 42,500; Referee: Robin Braun

4 April 2025 28	Karlsruher SC	1–0	Hannover 96	Karlsruhe
18:30 CEST (UTC+2)	Kobald 54'	Report		Stadium: BBBank Wildpark; Attendance: 28,818; Referee: Florian Exner

12 April 2025 29	Hannover 96	1–3	SV Elversberg	Hanover
13:00 CEST (UTC+2)	Neumann 12'	Report	Asllani 55', 78', 90+8'	Stadium: Heinz von Heiden Arena; Attendance: 35,500; Referee: Eric Weisbach

20 April 2025 30	Darmstadt 98	3–1	Hannover 96	Darmstadt
13:30 CEST (UTC+2)	Hornby 1', 90+2' (pen.); Corredor 83'	Report	Voglsammer 82'	Stadium: Merck-Stadion am Böllenfalltor; Attendance: 17,810; Referee: Max Burda

27 April 2025 31	Hannover 96	1–0	1. FC Köln	Hanover
13:30 CEST (UTC+2)	Gindorf 57'	Report		Stadium: Heinz von Heiden Arena; Attendance: 49,000; Referee: Timo Gansloweit

3 May 2025 32	SSV Ulm	1–2	Hannover 96	Ulm
13:00 CEST (UTC+2)	Telalović 51'	Report	Gaal 28' (o.g.); Knight 67'	Stadium: Donaustadion; Attendance: 17,200; Referee: Timo Gerach

11 May 2025 33	Hannover 96	1–1	Greuther Fürth	Hanover
13:30 CEST (UTC+2)	Neumann 87'	Report	Futkeu 33'	Stadium: Heinz von Heiden Arena; Attendance: 36,500; Referee: Richard Hempel

18 May 2025 34	Hertha BSC	1–1	Hannover 96	Berlin
15:30 CEST (UTC+2)	Reese 37'	Report	Tresoldi 9'	Stadium: Olympiastadion; Attendance: 66,997; Referee: Florian Heft

=== DFB-Pokal ===
17 August 2024 First round	Arminia Bielefeld	2–0	Hannover 96	Bielefeld
18:00 CEST (UTC+2)	Becker 13'; Oppie 22'	Report		Stadium: SchücoArena; Attendance: 26,044; Referee: Robert Hartmann

== Statistics ==
=== Appearances and goals ===
No.	Pos	Player	2. Bundesliga		DFB-Pokal		Total	
No.	Pos	Player	Apps	Goals	Apps	Goals	Apps	Goals
1	GK	(Germany) Ron-Robert Zieler	34	0	0	0	34	0
2	DF	(England) Josh Knight	16+7	3	1	0	24	3
3	DF	(Germany) Boris Tomiak	10+1	0	0	0	11	0
4	DF	(Germany) Kenneth Schmidt	0	0	0	0	0	0
5	DF	(Germany) Phil Neumann	33	2	1	0	34	2
6	MF	(Germany) Fabian Kunze	25+5	1	1	0	31	1
7	FW	(Germany) Jessic Ngankam	18+9	4	0+1	0	28	4
8	MF	(Germany) Enzo Leopold	32+1	2	1	0	34	2
9	FW	(Germany) Nicolò Tresoldi	25+9	7	1	0	35	7
10	MF	(Germany) Jannik Rochelt	19+8	2	0+1	0	28	2
11	MF	(South Korea) Lee Hyun-ju	19+5	3	0	0	24	3
13	MF	(Germany) Max Christiansen	9+7	1	0+1	0	17	1
14	FW	(Lebanon) Husseyn Chakroun	0+1	0	0	0	1	0
15	MF	(Germany) Noël Aséko Nkili	0+1	0	0	0	1	0
16	FW	(Norway) Håvard Nielsen	15+16	2	0+1	0	32	2
17	DF	(Poland) Bartłomiej Wdowik	17+4	0	0	0	21	0
19	MF	(Germany) Eric Uhlmann	0	0	0	0	0	0
20	DF	(Germany) Jannik Dehm	13+8	1	1	0	22	1
21	DF	(Japan) Sei Muroya	25+2	0	1	0	28	0
23	DF	(Germany) Marcel Halstenberg	28	3	1	0	29	3
25	MF	(Germany) Lars Gindorf	8+16	1	1	0	25	1
28	MF	(Germany) Montell Ndikom	0	0	0	0	0	0
29	MF	(Sweden) Kolja Oudenne	4+8	0	0	0	12	0
30	GK	(Germany) Leo Weinkauf	0	0	1	0	1	0
32	FW	(Germany) Andreas Voglsammer	8+21	3	1	0	30	3
35	GK	(Germany) Leon-Oumar Wechsel	0	0	0	0	0	0
37	DF	(Germany) Brooklyn Ezeh	6+5	0	0+1	0	12	0
38	FW	(Germany) Thaddäus-Monju Momuluh	8+13	2	0	0	21	2
40	FW	(Wales) Rabbi Matondo	2+8	1	0	0	10	1

=== Goalscorers ===
Rank	No.	Pos	Name	2. Bundesliga	DFB-Pokal	Total
1	9	FW	(Germany) Nicolò Tresoldi	7	0	7
2	7	FW	(Germany) Jessic Ngankam	4	0	4
3	2	DF	(England) Josh Knight	3	0	3
3	11	MF	(South Korea) Lee Hyun-ju	3	0	3
3	23	DF	(Germany) Marcel Halstenberg	3	0	3
3	32	FW	(Germany) Andreas Voglsammer	3	0	3
7	5	DF	(Germany) Phil Neumann	2	0	2
7	8	MF	(Germany) Enzo Leopold	2	0	2
7	10	MF	(Germany) Jannik Rochelt	2	0	2
7	16	FW	(Norway) Håvard Nielsen	2	0	2
7	38	FW	(Germany) Thaddäus-Monju Momuluh	2	0	2
12	6	MF	(Germany) Fabian Kunze	1	0	1
12	13	MF	(Germany) Max Christiansen	1	0	1
12	20	DF	(Germany) Jannik Dehm	1	0	1
12	25	MF	(Germany) Lars Gindorf	1	0	1
12	40	FW	(Wales) Rabbi Matondo	1	0	1
Own goals				3	0	3
Total				41	0	41

=== Clean sheets ===
Rank	No.	Pos	Name	2. Bundesliga	DFB-Pokal	Total
1	1	GK	(Germany) Ron-Robert Zieler	11	0	11
Total				11	0	11

=== Disciplinary record ===
Rank	No.	Pos	Name	2. Bundesliga			DFB-Pokal			Total		
Rank	No.	Pos	Name	Booked	(yellow card) (yellow-red card)	Sent off (straight red)	Booked	(yellow card) (yellow-red card)	Sent off (straight red)	Booked	(yellow card) (yellow-red card)	Sent off (straight red)
1	6	MF	(Germany) Fabian Kunze	10	1	0	0	0	0	10	1	0
2	13	MF	(Germany) Max Christiansen	4	0	1	0	0	0	4	0	1
3	3	DF	(Germany) Boris Tomiak	3	0	1	0	0	0	3	0	1
4	5	DF	(Germany) Phil Neumann	7	0	0	0	0	0	7	0	0
4	7	FW	(Germany) Jessic Ngankam	7	0	0	0	0	0	7	0	0
4	8	MF	(Germany) Enzo Leopold	7	0	0	0	0	0	7	0	0
7	21	DF	(Japan) Sei Muroya	6	0	0	0	0	0	6	0	0
7	23	DF	(Germany) Marcel Halstenberg	5	0	0	1	0	0	6	0	0
9	2	DF	(England) Josh Knight	5	0	0	0	0	0	5	0	0
10	1	GK	(Germany) Ron-Robert Zieler	4	0	0	0	0	0	4	0	0
10	20	DF	(Germany) Jannik Dehm	1	1	0	0	0	0	1	1	0
12	11	MF	(South Korea) Lee Hyun-ju	3	0	0	0	0	0	3	0	0
12	17	DF	(Poland) Bartłomiej Wdowik	3	0	0	0	0	0	3	0	0
12	25	MF	(Germany) Lars Gindorf	3	0	0	0	0	0	3	0	0
12	38	FW	(Germany) Thaddäus-Monju Momuluh	3	0	0	0	0	0	3	0	0
16	10	MF	(Germany) Jannik Rochelt	1	0	0	1	0	0	2	0	0
16	16	FW	(Norway) Håvard Nielsen	2	0	0	0	0	0	2	0	0
18	9	FW	(Germany) Nicolò Tresoldi	1	0	0	0	0	0	1	0	0
18	29	MF	(Sweden) Kolja Oudenne	1	0	0	0	0	0	1	0	0
18	32	FW	(Germany) Andreas Voglsammer	1	0	0	0	0	0	1	0	0
18	37	DF	(Germany) Brooklyn Ezeh	1	0	0	0	0	0	1	0	0
18	40	FW	(Wales) Rabbi Matondo	1	0	0	0	0	0	1	0	0
Total				79	2	2	2	0	0	81	2	2

== See also ==
- 2024–25 Hannover 96 II season
