= Mustafë Abdullahu =

Kosovan footballer (born 2004)

Personal information
- Date of birth: 27 February 2004 (age 22)
- Place of birth: Podujevë, Kosovo under UN administration
- Height: 2.02 m (6 ft 8 in)
- Position: Goalkeeper

Team information
- Current team: Besa Kavajë (on loan from Tirana)
- Number: 91

Youth career
- –2022: Llapi

Senior career*
Years	Team	Apps	(Gls)
2021–2022	Llapi	1	(0)
2022–2023	Feronikeli	7	(0)
2023	Besa Kavajë	3	(0)
2023–	Tirana	13	(0)
2024–2025	→ Malisheva (loan)	5	(0)
2025	→ Karlsruher SC (loan)	0	(0)
2025–	→ Besa Kavajë (loan)	33	(0)

International career^{‡}
2023–	Kosovo U21	5	(0)
- * Club domestic league appearances and goals as of 3 February 2025 ‡ National team caps and goals as of 11 November 2024

Mustafë Abdullahu (born 27 February 2004) is a Kosovan professional footballer who plays as a goalkeeper for Albanian club Besa Kavajë (on loan from Tirana).

== Club career ==
=== Early career ===
Abdullahu began his career in the youth team of the Kosovo Superleague club Llapi. On 23 April 2022, he was named as a first-team substitute for the first time in a league match against Feronikeli. His debut with Llapi came on 15 May in a 3–2 away defeat against Dukagjini after being named in the starting line-up. In August 2022, Abdullahu joined Kosovo First League side Feronikeli.

=== Besa Kavajë ===
In January 2023, Abdullahu joined Kategoria e Parë side Besa Kavajë. His debut with Besa Kavajë came on 1 April against Lushnja after being named in the starting line-up.

=== Tirana ===
On 1 September 2023, Abdullahu joined Kategoria Superiore side Tirana after agreeing to a five-year deal, to replace the injured Gentian Selmani as the first choice. Tirana reportedly paid a €50,000 transfer fee. His debut with Tirana came on 7 October against Vllaznia Shkodër after being named in the starting line-up.

==== Loan at Malisheva ====
On 5 September 2024, Abdullahu joined Kosovo Superleague side Malisheva, on a season-long loan. Ten days later, he was named as a Malisheva substitute for the first time in a league match against Dukagjini. His debut with Malisheva came on 18 September against Drita after being named in the starting line-up.

==== Loan at Karlsruher SC ====
On 3 February 2025, Abdullahu was loaned to 2. Bundesliga side Karlsruher SC until the end of the season.

== International career ==
Before being called up by any national team, there were reports that Abdullahu would be pledging his allegiance to Albania U21, where he was also promised inclusion in the Albania senior squad for UEFA Euro 2024. However, on 11 November 2023, Abdullahu received a call-up from Kosovo U21 for the UEFA Euro 2025 qualification matches against Bulgaria and Israel. His debut with Kosovo U21 came ten days later in the UEFA Euro 2025 qualification match against Israel after coming on as a substitute at 46th minute in place of Altin Gjokaj.

On 30 May 2024, Abdullahu received a call-up from Kosovo for the friendly match against Norway, but he was an unused substitute in this match.

== Career statistics ==
=== Club ===
As of 3 February 2025

Appearances and goals by club, season and competition
Club	Season	League			Cup		Other		Total	
Club	Season	Division	Apps	Goals	Apps	Goals	Apps	Goals	Apps	Goals
Llapi	2021–22	Kosovo Superleague	1	0	—		—		1	0
Feronikeli	2022–23	Kosovo First League	7	0	—		—		7	0
Besa Kavajë	2022–23	Kategoria e Parë	3	0	—		—		3	0
Tirana	2023–24	Kategoria Superiore	13	0	0	0	—		13	0
Malisheva (loan)	2024–25	Kosovo Superleague	5	0	—		—		5	0
Karlsruher SC (loan)	2024–25	2. Bundesliga	0	0	0	0	—		0	0
Career total			24	0	0	0	—		24	0
