= Ruben Müller =

German footballer

Personal information
- Date of birth: 24 August 2005 (age 21)
- Place of birth: Rottweil, Germany
- Height: 1.79 m (5 ft 10 in)
- Position: Right-back

Team information
- Current team: SC Paderborn
- Number: 2

Youth career
- SpVgg Oberndorf
- 2016–2020: SV Zimmern
- 2020–2025: SC Freiburg

Senior career*
Years	Team	Apps	(Gls)
2024–2025	SC Freiburg II	32	(3)
2025–2026	SC Paderborn II	8	(1)
2025–	SC Paderborn	23	(0)

International career^{‡}
2026–	Germany U20	2	(1)
- * Club domestic league appearances and goals as of 17:26, 17 October 2026 (UTC) ‡ National team caps and goals as of 14:20, 22 July 2026 (UTC)

Ruben Müller (born 24 August 2005) is a German professional footballer who plays as a right-back for Bundesliga club SC Paderborn.

== Club career ==
Müller is a product of the youth academies of the German clubs SpVgg Oberndorf and SV Zimmern, before moving to SC Freiburg in 2020 to finish his development. He was promoted to Freiburg's reserves in the Regionalliga in 2024. On 23 June 2025, he signed with SC Paderborn in the 2. Bundesliga. He made his senior and professional debut with Paderborn as a substitute in a 1–0 win over VfL Bochum on 12 September 2025.

== International career ==
Müller was born in Germany to a German father and Spanish mother, and holds dual German and Spanish citizenship. He received his first call-up to the Germany U20s on 22 March 2026 for a set of friendlies.

== Career statistics ==
As of match played 28 October 2026

Appearances and goals by club, season and competition
Club	Season	League			DFB-Pokal		Other		Total	
Club	Season	Division	Apps	Goals	Apps	Goals	Apps	Goals	Apps	Goals
SC Freiburg II	2024–25	Regionalliga Südwest	32	3	—		—		32	3
SC Paderborn II	2025–26	Regionalliga West	2	1	—		—		2	1
SC Paderborn II	2026–27	Regionalliga West	6	0	—		—		6	0
SC Paderborn II	Total		8	1	—		—		8	1
SC Paderborn	2025–26	2. Bundesliga	22	0	—		2 (Note: Appearances in 2. Bundesliga promotion play-offs)	0	24	0
SC Paderborn	2026–27	Bundesliga	1	0	1	0	—		2	0
SC Paderborn	Total		23	0	1	0	2	0	26	0
Career total			63	4	1	0	2	0	66	4
