= Thaddäus-Monju Momuluh =

German footballer

Personal information
- Date of birth: 18 February 2002 (age 24)
- Place of birth: Hanover, Germany
- Height: 1.81 m (5 ft 11 in)
- Position: Forward

Team information
- Current team: Arminia Bielefeld
- Number: 14

Youth career
- –2017: JFV Calenberger Land
- 2017–: Hannover 96

Senior career*
Years	Team	Apps	(Gls)
2021–2025	Hannover 96 II	60	(16)
2023–2025	Hannover 96	27	(2)
2024	→ Arminia Bielefeld (loan)	11	(1)
2025–	Arminia Bielefeld	29	(5)
- * Club domestic league appearances and goals as of 18 May 2026

Thaddäus-Monju Momuluh (born 18 February 2002) is a German professional footballer who plays for 2. Bundesliga club Arminia Bielefeld as a forward.

== Career ==
Momuluh started his career with Hannover 96 after playing for their youth and reserve teams. He made his professional debut for Hannover 96 in the 2. Bundesliga on 11 February 2023, against SC Paderborn, coming on as a substitute for Jannik Dehm in the 58th minute; the match eventually ended in a 4–3 home loss for his side. He was loaned out to Arminia Bielefeld for the second half of the 2023–24 season.

On 1 September 2025, Momuluh was signed by Arminia Bielefeld permanently.

== Personal life ==
Momuluh was born in Germany to a Cameroonian father and Polish mother.
