= Rabbi Matondo =

Wales international footballer (born 2000)

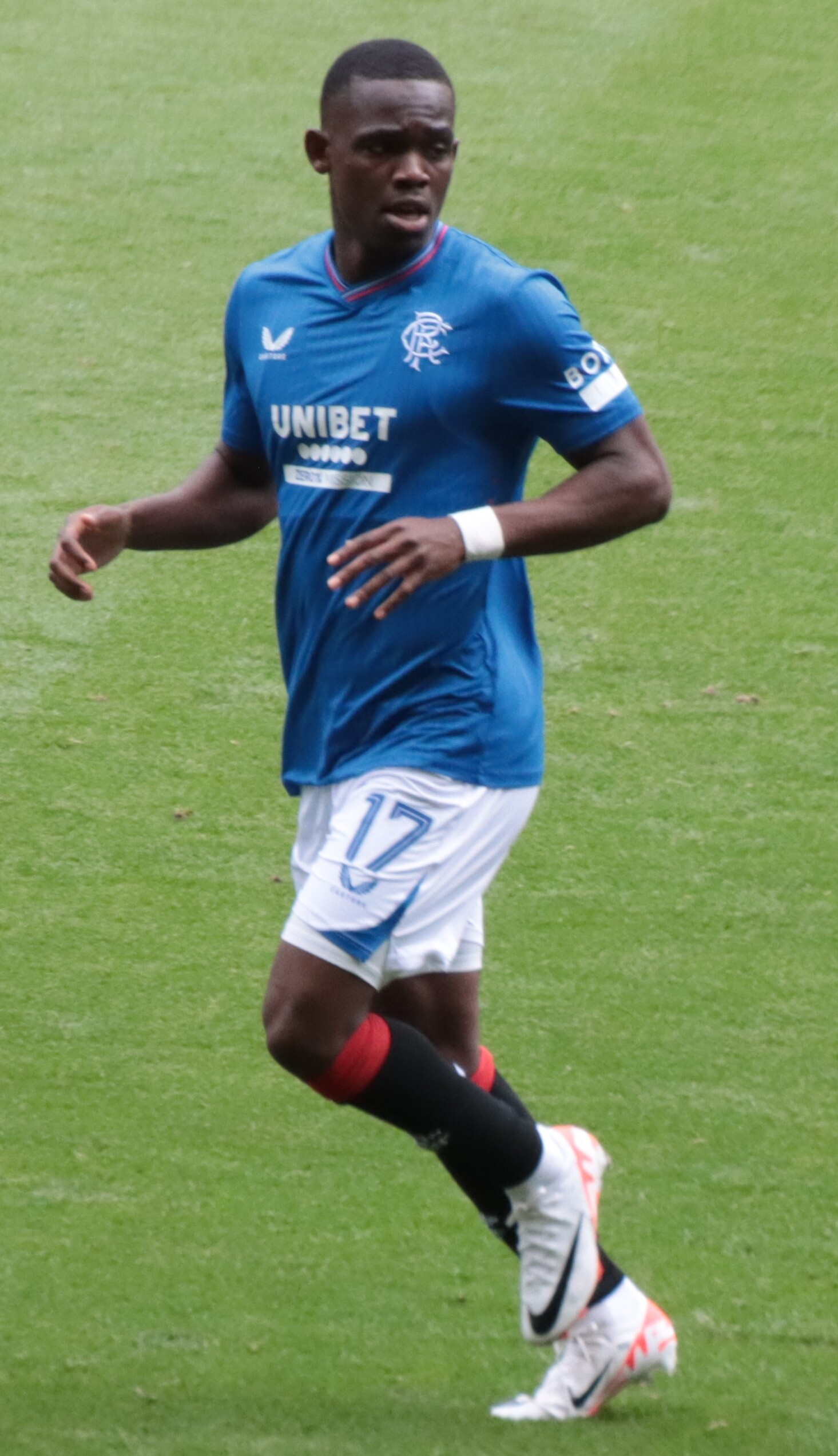
- Matondo with Rangers in 2023

Personal information
- Full name: Rabbi Matondo
- Date of birth: 9 September 2000 (age 26)
- Place of birth: Liverpool, England
- Height: 1.75 m (5 ft 9 in)
- Position: Winger

Team information
- Current team: Hibernian
- Number: 39

Youth career
- Cardiff City
- 2016–2019: Manchester City

Senior career*
Years	Team	Apps	(Gls)
2019	Schalke 04 II	2	(0)
2019–2022	Schalke 04	30	(2)
2021	→ Stoke City (loan)	10	(1)
2021–2022	→ Cercle Brugge (loan)	26	(9)
2022–2026	Rangers	45	(7)
2025	→ Hannover 96 (loan)	10	(1)
2026	Brann	3	(0)
2026–	Hibernian	0	(0)

International career^{‡}
2015	England U15		
2015–2016	Wales U17	10	(0)
2017–2018	Wales U21	8	(0)
2018–	Wales	15	(1)
- * Club domestic league appearances and goals as of 18:02, 4 September 2026 (UTC) ‡ National team caps and goals as of 19:00, 9 June 2025 (UTC)

Rabbi Matondo (born 9 September 2000) is a professional footballer who plays as a winger for Scottish Premiership club Hibernian. Born in England, he plays for the Wales national team.

Matondo played youth football for Cardiff City and Manchester City. He joined German club Schalke 04 in January 2019, where he made 32 first-team appearances and was sent on loan to Stoke City and Cercle Brugge. He had a three-and-a-half year spell at Scottish club Rangers before moving to Norwegian side Brann.

Born in England to parents from the DR Congo, Matondo was eligible to play for either country, as well as Wales, where he grew up. Having played for the England under-15 team, he later opted to represent Wales and played at under-17 and under-21 levels before making his debut for the senior national team in November 2018.

== Early life ==
Matondo was born in Liverpool, England but moved to south Wales as a child. He grew up in the Tremorfa area of Cardiff where he first played football in local parks with his father and brothers. His father Dada played football in his native DR Congo. Two of his brothers, Cedrick and Japhet, also played football for Cardiff City, Newport County and Stoke City at youth level. As a teenager he attended St. Illtyds Catholic Highschool.

== Club career ==
=== Early career ===
Matondo began his career as a youth player with Cardiff City. In 2016, he moved to Premier League side Manchester City for a small compensation fee under the Elite Player Performance Plan, an initiative created by the Premier League regarding movement of youth players. Cardiff appealed against the move and Matondo was blocked from playing for Manchester City until March 2017 when the appeal was denied. However, a fee of £500,000 was reported to have been agreed.

He made his debut for the Manchester City U21 side in the EFL Trophy on 15 August 2017 against Rotherham United, scoring his first goal in the side's next match, a 2–1 defeat to Bradford City. He added two more goals in the 2018–19 EFL Trophy, the game's only away to Tranmere Rovers in the final group game, and one more in a 3–3 draw at Barnsley in the second round, as well as netting in the subsequent penalty shootout win.

=== Schalke 04 ===
On 30 January 2019, Matondo signed for Bundesliga club Schalke 04 for a reported fee of up to £11 million on a four-and-a-half-year deal. He made his professional league debut three days later in a 2–0 home loss to Borussia Mönchengladbach, as a 75th-minute substitute for Sebastian Rudy; on 16 February he was given a start in a goalless home draw with SC Freiburg. On 28 September 2019, he scored his first goal for Schalke in a 3–1 away victory over RB Leipzig.

On 7 January 2021, Matondo joined EFL Championship club Stoke City on a loan deal until the end of the 2020–21 season. He played 11 times for Stoke, scoring once in a 1–1 draw with Nottingham Forest on 24 April 2021.

On 9 August 2021, Matondo agreed to join Cercle Brugge on a season-long loan with an option to make the move permanent.

=== Rangers ===
On 12 July 2022, Rangers announced the signing of Matondo on a four-year deal, subject to international clearance. He made his debut for the club against Belgian side Union Saint-Gilloise during a UEFA Champions League qualifier loss on 2 August. On 4 October 2022, he made his 5th UEFA Champions League appearance for Rangers away against Liverpool as a substitute. Rangers lost 2-0, however their first big chance in the game came through Matondo in the 84th minute (3 minutes after he came on), where his pace allowed him to breeze past Joel Matip and nutmeg Liverpool goalkeeper Alisson Becker, but had his shot cleared off the line by Kostas Tsimikas before it could be tapped into the net by Fashion Sakala. Matondo scored his first UEFA Champions League goal in a 1st leg Qualifier on 22 August 2023 vs PSV Eindhoven slotting home a first-time finish into the bottom corner after a counter-attack to equalise. He left Rangers in March 2026.

=== Loan to Hannover 96 ===
On 30 January 2025, Matondo signed for Hannover 96 on loan from Rangers for the remainder of the 2024–25 season. Matondo scored 34 minutes into his debut against Hamburger SV.

=== SK Brann ===
On 31 March 2026, Matondo joined Brann on a permanent deal. In August 2026 he was released by Brann.

=== Hibernian ===
In September 2026, Matondo joined Scottish Premiership club Hibernian on trial, before joining them on a free transfer on 7 October, signing a contract until the end of the season, with an option for an additional year. Matondo made his debut for the club on 10 October in a 1-0 loss at Dundee United.

== International career ==
Matondo was eligible to represent DR Congo, England or Wales at international level. He represented England at under-15 level before switching allegiance to Wales at under-17 level. He made 10 appearances for the under-17 team. He received his first call up to the Wales under-21 squad in September 2017, making his debut for the side in a 3–1 victory over Liechtenstein. After appearing in four qualifying matches as a substitute, he made his first start for the under-21 side in a 1–1 draw with Georgia in the second of two friendlies against the nation in June 2018. He played eight games in total at under-21 level.

In November 2018, Matondo received his first call up for the senior Welsh squad for a friendly against Albania. He made his international debut during the match on 20 November as a 78th-minute substitute in place of Sam Vokes as Wales lost 1–0 in Elbasan.

In May 2019, after travelling back to England from a Welsh national team training camp in Portugal, Matondo was escorted from the plane by police after "behaving disruptively".

On 8 October 2020, Matondo started for Wales in a friendly against England.

On 1 June 2022, Matondo came on as a half time substitute for Wales in a Nations League Group A game against Poland. Wales lost 2–1 with Matondo providing the assist for Jonny Williams's Wales goal.

On 22 March 2025, Matondo came on in the second half for Wales in a World Cup qualifier against Kazakhstan. Wales won 3-1 with Matondo scoring his first international goal in the closing stages of the match.

== Career statistics ==
=== Club ===
As of match played 20 May 2026

Appearances and goals by club, season and competition
Club	Season	League			National cup (Note: Includes DFB-Pokal, FA Cup, Belgian Cup, Scottish Cup)		League cup (Note: Includes Scottish League Cup)		Europe		Other		Total	
Club	Season	Division	Apps	Goals	Apps	Goals	Apps	Goals	Apps	Goals	Apps	Goals	Apps	Goals
Manchester City U21	2017–18	—	—		—		—		—		2 (Note: Appearances in EFL Trophy)	1	2	1
Manchester City U21	2018–19	—	—		—		—		—		4	2	4	2
Manchester City U21	Total		—		—		—		—		6	3	6	3
Schalke 04 II	2018–19	Oberliga Westfalen	1	0	—		—		—		—		1	0
Schalke 04 II	2019–20	Regionalliga West	1	0	—		—		—		—		1	0
Schalke 04 II	Total		2	0	—		—		—		—		2	0
Schalke 04	2018–19	Bundesliga	7	0	1	0	—		0	0	—		8	0
Schalke 04	2019–20	Bundesliga	20	2	1	0	—		—		—		21	2
Schalke 04	2020–21	Bundesliga	3	0	0	0	—		—		—		3	0
Schalke 04	Total		30	2	2	0	—		0	0	—		32	2
Stoke City (loan)	2020–21	Championship	10	1	1	0	—		—		—		11	1
Cercle Brugge (loan)	2021–22	Belgian Pro League	26	9	1	1	—		—		—		27	10
Rangers	2022–23	Scottish Premiership	19	0	1	0	1	0	7 (Note: Appearances in UEFA Champions League)	0	—		28	0
Rangers	2023–24	Scottish Premiership	19	5	5	0	1	0	6 (Note: Two appearances and one goal in UEFA Champions League, four appearances in UEFA Europa League)	1	—		31	6
Rangers	2024–25	Scottish Premiership	6	2	0	0	1	0	1	0	—		8	2
Rangers	2025–26	Scottish Premiership	1	0	2	0	0	0	0	0	—		3	0
Rangers	Total		45	7	8	0	3	0	14	1	—		70	8
Hannover 96 (loan)	2024–25	2. Bundesliga	10	1	—		—		—		—		10	1
Brann	2026	Eliteserien	3	0	0	0	—		0	0	—		3	0
Hibernian	2026–27	Scottish Premiership	0	0	0	0	0	0	0	0	—		0	0
Career total			126	20	12	1	3	0	14	1	6	3	161	25

=== International ===
As of match played 9 June 2025

Appearances and goals by national team and year
National team	Year	Apps	Goals
Wales	2018	1	0
Wales	2019	3	0
Wales	2020	3	0
Wales	2021	1	0
Wales	2022	3	0
Wales	2023	0	0
Wales	2024	1	0
Wales	2025	3	1
Wales	2026	0	0
Total		15	1

List of international goals scored by Rabbi Matondo
No.	Date	Venue	Opponent	Score	Result	Competition
1	22 March 2025	Cardiff City Stadium, Cardiff, Wales	Kazakhstan	3–1	3–1	2026 FIFA World Cup qualification

== Honours ==
Rangers

- Scottish League Cup: 2023–24
