= Lee Hyun-ju (footballer) =

South Korean footballer (born 2003)

Personal information
- Date of birth: 7 February 2003 (age 23)
- Place of birth: Ansan, Gyeonggi, South Korea
- Height: 1.72 m (5 ft 8 in)
- Positions: Winger; attacking midfielder

Team information
- Current team: Arouca
- Number: 14

Youth career
- 2012–2015: Tree Mers
- 2016–2021: Pohang Steelers (Note: Played for Pohang Jecheol Middle School from 2016 to 2018, and Pohang Jecheol High School from 2019 to 2021, which were academies of Pohang Steelers.)

Senior career*
Years	Team	Apps	(Gls)
2022	Pohang Steelers	0	(0)
2022	→ Bayern Munich II (loan)	8	(3)
2022–2025	Bayern Munich II	18	(7)
2023–2024	→ Wehen Wiesbaden (loan)	28	(4)
2024–2025	→ Hannover 96 (loan)	24	(3)
2025–	Arouca	37	(7)

International career^{‡}
2017	South Korea U14	2	(1)
2018–2019	South Korea U17	8	(6)
2022–	South Korea U23	9	(0)
2024–	South Korea	1	(0)
Medal record
Men's football
Representing South Korea
Asian Games
Gold medal – first place	2026 Aichi–Nagoya
- * Club domestic league appearances and goals as of 7 November 2026 ‡ National team caps and goals as of 30 September 2026

- Lee Hyun-ju
- Hangul: 이현주
- RR: I Hyeonju
- MR: I Hyŏnju

Lee Hyun-ju (Korean: 이현주; born 7 February 2003) is a South Korean professional footballer who plays as a winger or attacking midfielder for Primeira Liga club Arouca and the South Korea national team.

== Early life ==
Lee spent his youth career at Tree Mers FC in Ansan and Pohang Steelers.

== Club career ==
=== Bayern Munich II ===
In January 2022, Lee joined German giants Bayern Munich from Pohang Steelers on a year-long loan deal, with the option to make the deal permanent. After impressing with the club's reserve team while on loan, Bayern Munich took up the option to make the deal permanent in August 2022, with Lee signing a deal through 2025. He played for the reserve team at the Regionalliga Bayern.

On 7 July 2023, Lee was loaned to recently promoted 2. Bundesliga club Wehen Wiesbaden for the 2023–24 season. On 23 June 2024, he extended his contract with Bayern Munich until 2027 and was loaned to another 2. Bundesliga club Hannover 96 for the 2024–25 season, with an option to make the move permanent. He had performed various roles in Bayern's midfield, whereas he mostly played as a winger at the two clubs.

=== Arouca ===
On 23 July 2025, Lee moved to Portugal and joined Primeira Liga club Arouca, permanently for an estimated €1.5 million fee. The figure was Arouca's highest-ever transfer fee. On 9 August, he provided an assist in a 3–1 win over AVS, where he made his Primeira Liga debut. He had seven goals and three assists in 30 matches, while Arouca finished the 2025–26 season in eighth place. Prior to the 2026 FIFA World Cup, South Korean media recommended him for a member of the national team after watching his performances at the Primeira Liga, but he was not called up.

== International career ==
In September 2022, Lee was called up to the South Korea Olympic team for a friendly against Uzbekistan.

In November 2024, Lee received his first call-up to the South Korea national team before the 2026 FIFA World Cup qualifiers against Kuwait and Palestine. He made his debut against Kuwait.

== Personal life ==
Lee has named Joshua Kimmich as a player he idolises, while also crediting Jamal Musiala as a similarly-aged player he looks up to.

== Career statistics ==
=== Club ===
As of matches played 21 November 2026

Appearances and goals by club, season and competition
Club	Season	League			Cup (Note: Includes DFB-Pokal, Taça de Portugal)		Other		Total	
Club	Season	Division	Apps	Goals	Apps	Goals	Apps	Goals	Apps	Goals
Pohang Steelers	2022	K League 1	0	0	0	0	0	0	0	0
Bayern Munich II (loan)	2021–22	Regionalliga Bayern	6	1	—		—		6	1
Bayern Munich II (loan)	2022–23	Regionalliga Bayern	2	2	—		—		2	2
Bayern Munich II (loan)	Total		8	3	—		—		8	3
Bayern Munich II	2022–23	Regionalliga Bayern	18	7	—		—		18	7
Wehen Wiesbaden (loan)	2023–24	2. Bundesliga	28	4	1	0	2 (Note: Appearances in 2. Bundesliga relegation play-offs)	0	31	4
Hannover 96 (loan)	2024–25	2. Bundesliga	24	3	0	0	—		24	3
Arouca	2025–26	Primeira Liga	30	7	2	0	—		32	7
Arouca	2026–27	Primeira Liga	7	0	1	0	—		8	0
Arouca	Total		37	7	3	0	—		40	7
Career total			115	24	4	0	2	0	121	24

=== International ===
As of match played 14 November 2024

Appearances and goals by national team and year
National team	Year	Apps	Goals
South Korea	2024	1	0
Total		1	0

== Honours ==
South Korea U23

- Asian Games: 2026
