= Kenneth Schmidt =

German footballer (born 2002)

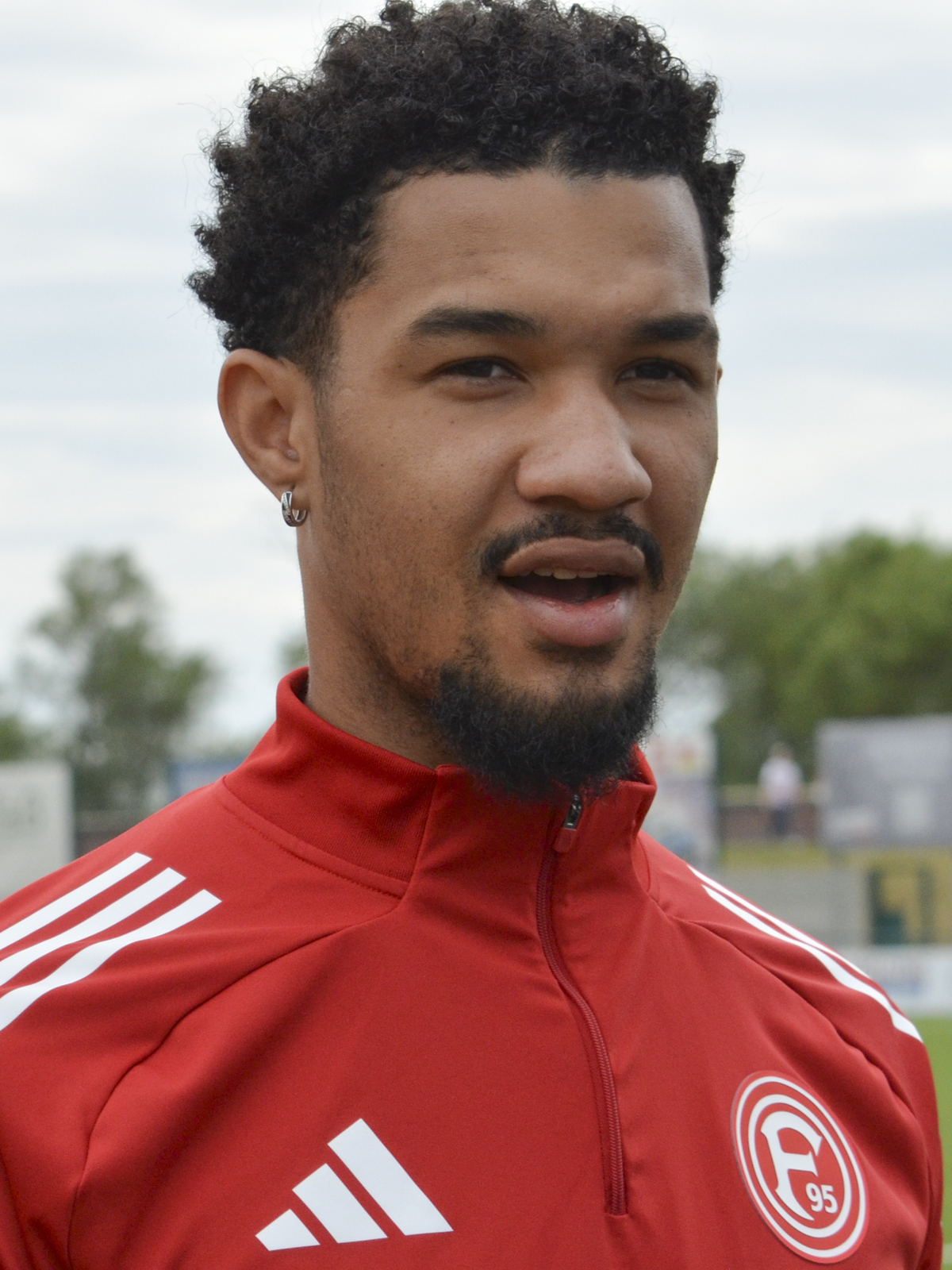
- Schmidt in 2025

Personal information
- Full name: Tan-Kenneth Jerico Leka-Schmidt
- Date of birth: 3 June 2002 (age 24)
- Place of birth: Freiburg, Germany
- Height: 1.87 m (6 ft 2 in)
- Positions: Left-back; centre-back

Team information
- Current team: Dynamo Dresden
- Number: 4

Youth career
- –2017: FC Emmendingen
- 2017–2023: SC Freiburg

Senior career*
| Years | Team | Apps | (Gls) |
| 2020–2024 | SC Freiburg II | 60 | (0) |
| 2023–2025 | SC Freiburg | 10 | (0) |
| 2025 | → Hannover 96 (loan) | 0 | (0) |
| 2025 | → Hannover 96 II (loan) | 7 | (0) |
| 2025–2026 | Fortuna Düsseldorf | 20 | (1) |
| 2026– | Dynamo Dresden | 0 | (0) |

International career^{‡}
| 2019 | Germany U18 | 2 | (1) |
| 2020 | Germany U19 | 1 | (0) |
| 2021–2022 | Germany U20 | 11 | (1) |
| 2023 | Germany U21 | 4 | (0) |
- * Club domestic league appearances and goals as of 18 May 2026 ‡ National team caps and goals as of 15:04, 19 October 2023 (UTC)

Tan-Kenneth Jerico Leka-Schmidt (born 3 June 2002), known as Kenneth Schmidt, is a German footballer who plays as a left-back or centre-back for 2. Bundesliga club Dynamo Dresden.

== Club career ==
A native of Freiburg, Schmidt joined the city's giant SC Freiburg from FC Emmendingen in 2017. He was promoted to the senior team in 2023 after spending three years with the reserves team. He made his professional debut on 17 March 2023 in the UEFA Europa League round of 16 game against Juventus.

On 1 January 2025, Schmidt was loaned out to Hannover 96 on an 18-month deal.

On 3 June 2025, Schmidt signed with Fortuna Düsseldorf on a permanent basis.

On 25 June 2026, he moved to Dynamo Dresden.

== International career ==
Schmidt has represented Germany at youth international level.

== Personal life ==
He was born to a German father and a Malagasy Vietnamese mother.

== Career statistics ==
As of 1 January 2025

Appearances and goals by club, season and competition
| Club | Season | League | | | Cup | | Continental | | Other | | Total | |
| Club | Season | Division | Apps | Goals | Apps | Goals | Apps | Goals | Apps | Goals | Apps | Goals |
|---|---|---|---|---|---|---|---|---|---|---|---|---|
| SC Freiburg II | 2020–21 | Regionalliga Südwest | 6 | 0 | – | | – | | – | | 6 | 0 |
| SC Freiburg II | 2021–22 | 3. Liga | 28 | 0 | – | | – | | – | | 28 | 0 |
| SC Freiburg II | 2022–23 | 3. Liga | 22 | 0 | – | | – | | – | | 22 | 0 |
| SC Freiburg II | 2023–24 | 3. Liga | 0 | 0 | – | | – | | – | | 0 | 0 |
| SC Freiburg II | 2024–25 | Regionalliga Südwest | 5 | 0 | – | | – | | – | | 5 | 0 |
| SC Freiburg II | Total | | 61 | 0 | – | | – | | – | | 61 | 0 |
| SC Freiburg | 2022–23 | Bundesliga | 5 | 0 | 0 | 0 | 1 (Note: Appearances in UEFA Europa League) | 0 | – | | 6 | 0 |
| SC Freiburg | 2023–24 | Bundesliga | 5 | 0 | 1 | 0 | 1 | 0 | – | | 7 | 0 |
| SC Freiburg | 2024–25 | Bundesliga | 0 | 0 | 0 | 0 | – | | – | | 0 | 0 |
| SC Freiburg | Total | | 10 | 0 | 1 | 0 | 2 | 0 | 0 | 0 | 13 | 0 |
| Hannover 96 (loan) | 2024–25 | 2. Bundesliga | 0 | 0 | 0 | 0 | – | | – | | 0 | 0 |
| Career total | | | 71 | 0 | 1 | 0 | 2 | 0 | 0 | 0 | 78 | 0 |
