= Bartłomiej Wdowik =

Polish footballer

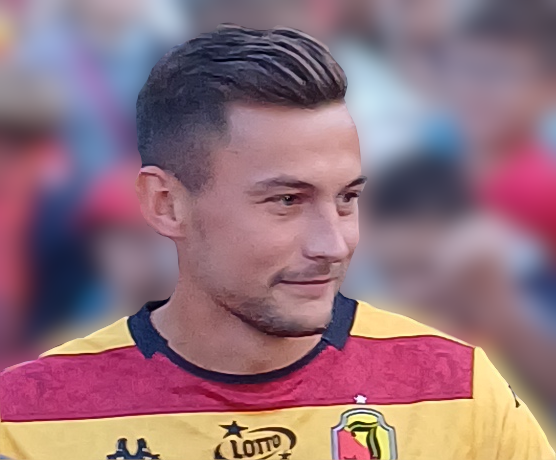
- Wdowik in 2025 with Jagiellonia Białystok

Personal information
- Date of birth: 25 September 2000 (age 26)
- Place of birth: Olkusz, Poland
- Height: 1.84 m (6 ft 0 in)
- Positions: Left-back; left winger

Team information
- Current team: Jagiellonia Białystok (on loan from Braga)
- Number: 20

Youth career
- KS Olkusz
- 2012–2016: Słowik Olkusz
- 2016–2018: Ruch Chorzów

Senior career*
Years	Team	Apps	(Gls)
2016	Spójnia Osiek-Zimnodół	13	(0)
2018–2019	Ruch Chorzów	19	(0)
2019–2020	Odra Opole	17	(0)
2020–2024	Jagiellonia Białystok	112	(12)
2024–	Braga	0	(0)
2024–2025	→ Hannover 96 (loan)	21	(0)
2025–2026	→ Jagiellonia Białystok (loan)	30	(0)
2026–	→ Jagiellonia Białystok (loan)	2	(0)

International career
2018–2019	Poland U20	3	(0)
2022	Poland U21	1	(0)
2023	Poland	1	(0)
- * Club domestic league appearances and goals as of 18:50, 20 September 2026 (UTC)

Bartłomiej Wdowik (born 25 September 2000) is a Polish professional footballer who plays as a left-back or a left winger for Ekstraklasa club Jagiellonia Białystok, on loan from Braga.

== Career ==
Wdowik joined Jagiellonia Białystok in 2020. He played every game of their title-winning 2023–24 campaign and recorded 10 goals, six of which came from direct free-kicks and one directly from a corner kick. Wdowik debuted for the Polish senior squad in November 2023 during a 2–0 friendly victory against Latvia, replacing Nicola Zalewski in the 78th minute. His performances across the season also earned him the Ekstraklasa Defender of the Season award in May 2024.

On 27 June 2024, Wdowik officially joined Portuguese side Braga ahead of the 2024–25 season for a €1.5 million fee with €200,000 in add-ons, signing a four-year contract with the club. He was subsequently loaned out to Hannover 96 for the 2024–25 season.

On 26 June 2025, Wdowik returned to Jagiellonia Białystok on a one-year loan spell. On 2 September 2026, he joined Jagiellonia for another year-long loan.

== Career statistics ==
As of match played 11 September 2026

Appearances and goals by club, season and competition
Club	Season	League			National cup (Note: Includes Polish Cup)		Europe		Other		Total	
Club	Season	Division	Apps	Goals	Apps	Goals	Apps	Goals	Apps	Goals	Apps	Goals
Spójnia Osiek-Zimnodół	2015–16	IV liga L. P. W.	13	0	—		—		—		13	0
Ruch Chorzów	2017–18	I liga	1	0	—		—		—		1	0
Ruch Chorzów	2018–19	II liga	18	0	1	0	—		—		19	0
Ruch Chorzów	Total		19	0	1	0	—		—		20	0
Odra Opole	2019–20	I liga	17	0	1	0	—		—		18	0
Jagiellonia Białystok	2019–20	Ekstraklasa	8	0	—		—		—		8	0
Jagiellonia Białystok	2020–21	Ekstraklasa	21	2	1	0	—		—		22	2
Jagiellonia Białystok	2021–22	Ekstraklasa	23	0	0	0	—		—		23	0
Jagiellonia Białystok	2022–23	Ekstraklasa	26	0	1	1	—		—		27	1
Jagiellonia Białystok	2023–24	Ekstraklasa	34	10	5	1	—		—		39	11
Jagiellonia Białystok	Total		112	12	7	2	0	0	0	0	119	14
Braga	2024–25	Primeira Liga	0	0	0	0	1 (Note: Appearance in UEFA Europa League)	0	0	0	1	0
Braga	2026–27	Primeira Liga	0	0	0	0	0	0	—		0	0
Braga	Total		0	0	0	0	1	0	0	0	1	0
Hannover 96 (loan)	2024–25	2. Bundesliga	21	0	0	0	—		—		21	0
Jagiellonia Białystok (loan)	2025–26	Ekstraklasa	30	0	1	0	13 (Note: Appearances in UEFA Conference League)	0	—		44	0
Jagiellonia Białystok (loan)	2026–27	Ekstraklasa	2	0	0	0	0	0	—		2	0
Career total			214	12	10	2	14	0	0	0	238	14

=== International ===
As of match played 21 November 2023

Appearances and goals by national team and year
National team	Year	Apps	Goals
Poland	2023	1	0
Total		1	0

== Honours ==
Jagiellonia Białystok

- Ekstraklasa: 2023–24

Individual

- Ekstraklasa Defender of the Season: 2023–24
