= Jessic Ngankam =

German footballer (born 2000)

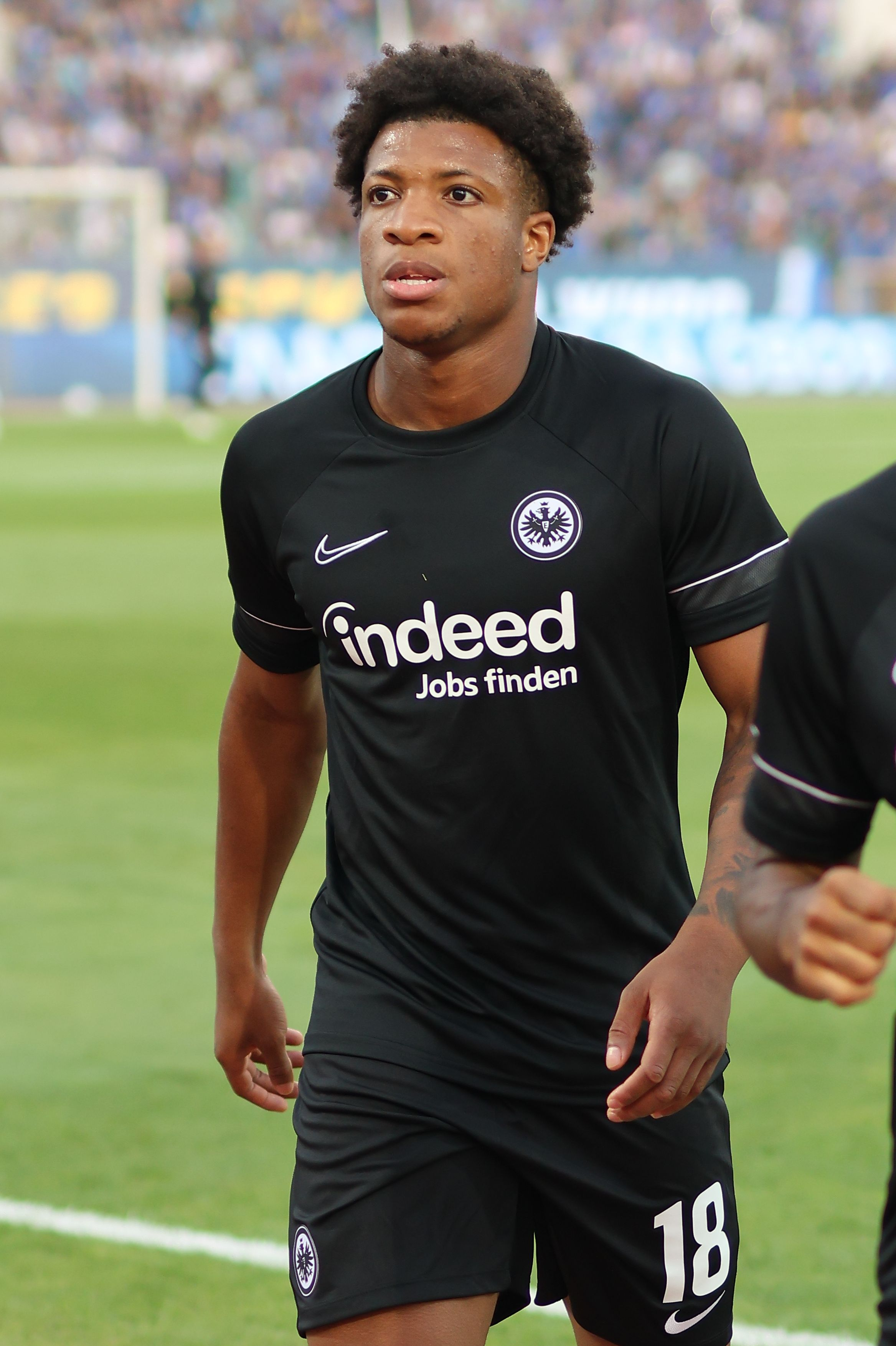
- Ngankam in 2023

Personal information
- Full name: Ngankam Jessic Gaïtan Ngankam
- Date of birth: 20 July 2000 (age 26)
- Place of birth: Berlin, Germany
- Height: 1.80 m (5 ft 11 in)
- Position: Forward

Team information
- Current team: Eintracht Frankfurt
- Number: 44

Youth career
- 2005–2006: Füchse Berlin Reinickendorf
- 2006–2019: Hertha BSC

Senior career*
Years	Team	Apps	(Gls)
2019–2022	Hertha BSC II	25	(12)
2020–2022	Hertha BSC	19	(2)
2021–2022	→ Greuther Fürth (loan)	6	(2)
2022	Greuther Fürth	0	(0)
2022–2023	Hertha BSC	18	(4)
2022–2023	Hertha BSC II	1	(0)
2023–	Eintracht Frankfurt	18	(0)
2024	→ Mainz 05 (loan)	7	(0)
2024–2025	→ Hannover 96 (loan)	27	(4)
2026	→ Wolfsberger (loan)	8	(1)

International career^{‡}
2017	Germany U17	4	(0)
2018	Germany U18	3	(0)
2023	Germany U21	5	(1)
- * Club domestic league appearances and goals as of 16 May 2026 ‡ National team caps and goals as of 19:16, 28 June 2023 (UTC)

Ngankam Jessic Gaïtan Ngankam (born 20 July 2000) is a German professional footballer who plays as a forward for Bundesliga club Eintracht Frankfurt.

A German youth international, Ngankam has made over 100 career appearances.

== Club career ==
Ngankam made his professional debut for Hertha BSC on 16 May 2020 in the Bundesliga, coming on as a substitute in the 79th minute for Vedad Ibišević in the away match against 1899 Hoffenheim, which finished as a 3–0 win. On 20 May 2020, he was given his first professional contract after impressing with the reserve side, signing a three year contract with the club.

He moved to Greuther Fürth in July 2021 on a season-long loan. Greuther Fürth secured an option to sign him permanently. On his second day at the club, he injured his cruciate ligament, and returned to playing in a friendly match against SSV Jahn Regensburg in March 2022.

On 31 May 2022, Ngankam returned to Hertha BSC and signed a contract extension to 2025. However, in July 2022, he suffered a twisted knee joint injury and had knee surgery.

On 14 July 2023, he signed a deal with another Bundesliga club, Eintracht Frankfurt, until 2028.

On 1 February 2024, Ngankam was loaned by Mainz 05 until the end of the season. He was then loaned by Hannover 96 for the 2024–25 season. In April 2025, in a match against SV Elversberg, he suffered a broken tibia and fibula injury and underwent surgery.

On 6 February 2026, Ngankam was loaned to Wolfsberg in Austria.

== International career ==
Ngankam was included in Germany's squad for the 2017 FIFA U-17 World Cup in India. He made four appearances during the tournament, in which Germany were eliminated in the quarter-finals with a 2–1 loss against Brazil. The following year, he made three appearances for the under-18 national team.

== Personal life ==
Ngankam was born in Berlin, and is of Cameroonian descent. His brother Roussel is also a footballer, and appeared for the Germany youth national teams. His other brother, Franck Djofang de Ngankam, is a talented young student studying health sciences at the University of Ottawa.

== Career statistics ==
As of match played 20 December 2025

Appearances and goals by club, season and competition
Club	Season	League			DFB-Pokal		Europe		Other		Total	
Club	Season	Division	Apps	Goals	Apps	Goals	Apps	Goals	Apps	Goals	Apps	Goals
Hertha BSC II	2019–20	Regionalliga Nordost	22	11	—		—		—		22	11
Hertha BSC II	2020–21	Regionalliga Nordost	3	1	—		—		—		3	1
Hertha BSC II	Total		25	12	—		—		—		25	12
Hertha BSC	2019–20	Bundesliga	4	0	0	0	—		—		4	0
Hertha BSC	2020–21	Bundesliga	15	2	0	0	—		—		15	2
Hertha BSC	Total		19	2	0	0	—		—		19	2
Greuther Fürth (loan)	2021–22	Bundesliga	6	2	0	0	—		—		6	2
Greuther Fürth	2022–23	Bundesliga	0	0	0	0	—		—		0	0
Hertha BSC	2022–23	Bundesliga	18	4	0	0	—		—		18	4
Hertha BSC II	2022–23	Regionalliga Nordost	1	0	—		—		—		1	0
Eintracht Frankfurt	2023–24	Bundesliga	15	0	2	2	6 (Note: Appearances in UEFA Europa Conference League)	1	—		23	2
Eintracht Frankfurt	2025–26	Bundesliga	3	0	0	0	1 (Note: Appearance in UEFA Champions League)	0	—		4	0
Eintracht Frankfurt	Total		18	0	2	2	7	1	0	0	27	3
Mainz 05 (loan)	2023–24	Bundesliga	7	0	—		—		—		7	0
Hannover 96 (loan)	2024–25	2. Bundesliga	27	4	1	0	—		—		28	4
Career total			121	24	3	2	7	1	0	0	131	26
