= Jannik Dehm =

German footballer

Personal information
- Date of birth: 2 May 1996 (age 30)
- Place of birth: Bruchsal, Germany
- Height: 1.81 m (5 ft 11 in)
- Positions: Right-back; right midfielder

Team information
- Current team: Greuther Fürth
- Number: 23

Youth career
- FC Germania Untergrombach
- –2007: FC Germania Friedrichstal
- 2007–2015: Karlsruher SC

Senior career*
Years	Team	Apps	(Gls)
2014–2015	Karlsruher SC II	1	(0)
2015	Karlsruher SC	1	(0)
2015–2018	1899 Hoffenheim II	86	(4)
2018–2021	Holstein Kiel	71	(2)
2021–2025	Hannover 96	85	(2)
2025–	Greuther Fürth	30	(2)

International career^{‡}
2013–2014	Germany U18	4	(0)
2014–2015	Germany U19	4	(0)
- * Club domestic league appearances and goals as of 18 May 2026 ‡ National team caps and goals as of 19:06, 3 August 2018 (UTC)

Jannik Dehm (born 2 May 1996) is a German professional footballer who plays as a right-back for 2. Bundesliga club Greuther Fürth.
