= 2026–27 TSV 1860 Munich season =

TSV 1860 Munich
2026–27 season
- President: Gernot Mang
- Head Coach: Alper Kayabunar (Interim)
- Stadium: Grünwalder Stadion
- Regionalliga Bayern: 4th
- DFB-Pokal: First Round vs Holstein Kiel
- Bavarian Cup: Second Round vs TSV Buchbach
- Top goalscorer: League: Michael Eberwein (5); All: Ortivero Calderon (9)
- Highest home attendance: 15,000 (vs Augsburg II, 7 August 2026, Regionalliga Bayern) (vs TSV Landsberg, 30 August 2026, Regionalliga Bayern) (vs TSV Schwaben Augsburg, 11 September 2026, Regionalliga Bayern) (vs 1. FC Nürnberg II, 20 September 2026, Regionalliga Bayern) (vs SpVgg Ansbach, 3 October 2026, Regionalliga Bayern)
- Lowest home attendance: 6,000 (vs TSV Buchbach, 1 September 2026, DFB-Pokal)
- Average home league attendance: 15,000
Home colours	Away colours	Third colours

The 2026–27 season is the 128th season in the history of TSV 1860 Munich, and the club's first season back in the Regionalliga Bayern following their administrative relegation from the 3. Liga. In addition to the domestic league, the club will participate in the DFB-Pokal and Bavarian Cup.

== Season events ==
=== Preseason ===
On 3 June 2026, 1860 confirmed that they had failed to receive a license from the German Football Association to compete in the 3. Liga, and therefor had been relegated to the Regionalliga Bayern.

On 6 June, 1860 were drawn against Holstein Kiel in the First Round of the DFB-Pokal.

On 25 June, 1860 filled for bankruptcy.

On 30 June, 1860 confirmed that Markus Kauczinski and his coaching staff had left the club, and that Alper Kayabunar had been placed in charge of the team.

=== July ===
On 2 July, Kevin Volland announced his retirement from football.

On 16 July, Tunay Deniz signed a new contract with the club, until the summer of 2027.

On 16 July, 1860 announced the return of Julian Bell to the club, signing from Chemie Leipzig, on a contract until the summer of 2028.

On 17 July, Florian Niederlechner signed a new contract with the club, until the summer of 2027.

On 20 July, 1860 announced that goalkeeping coach Vitus Eicher had come out of retirement to sign a playing contract with the club.

On 21 July, 1860 announced the return of Felix Weber to the club.

On 24 July, 1860 announced the sining of Michael Eberwein from Borussia Dortmund II, on a contract until the summer of 2028, and that Noah Klose had signed a new contract with the club until the summer of 2027.

On 27 July, 1860 announced the return of Dennis Dressel to the club, signing from SSV Ulm, on a contract until the summer of 2028.

On 29 July, 1860 announced the signing of Mark Gevorgyan from Hannover 96 II, on a contract until the summer of 2028.

On 31 July, 1860 announced the signing of Mathew Collins from Austria Salzburg, on a contract until the summer of 2027.

=== August ===
On 3 August, 1860 announced the signing of Moritz Seiffert from Erzgebirge Aue, on a contract until the summer of 2028.

On 26 August, 1860 announced the return to the club of Raphael Ott from Viktoria Köln.

On 31 August, 1860 announced the signing of Eric Uhlmann from Erzgebirge Aue.

=== September ===
On 9 September, 1860 announced that they had their contracts with Ortivero Calderon, Emre Erdogan, and Lance Fiedler. until the summer of 2028.

=== October ===
On 17 October, 1860 announced that they had extended their contract with Damjan Dordan until the summer of 2028.

On 22 October, 1860 announced that they had extended their contract with both Ludwig Estermann and Edon Krasniqi until 30 June 2028.

=== November ===
On 6 November, 1860's away match against Augsburg II, originally scheduled for 5 December, was postponed until 16/17 February after the game was moved to the Augsburg Arena due to the anticipated high level of spectator interest.

== Squad ==
As of match played 14 November 2026

No.	Name	Nationality	Position	Date of birth (age)	Signed from	Signed in	Contract ends	Apps.	Goals
Goalkeepers
1	Paul Bachmann	(Germany)	GK	19 July 2005 (age 21)	Ismaning	2024	2028	6	0
23	Stefan Musa	(Croatia)	GK	23 May 2002 (age 24)	TSV Landsberg	2025		0	0
30	Vitus Eicher	(Germany)	GK	5 November 1990 (age 36)	Unattached	2026		53	0
Defenders
2	Julian Bell	(Germany)	DF	10 January 2003 (age 23)	Chemie Leipzig	2026	2028	20	0
4	Felix Weber	(Germany)	DF	18 January 1995 (age 31)	DJK Vilzing	2026		110	10
6	Benedict Hoppe	(Germany)	DF	16 February 2001 (age 25)	Türkgücü München	2025		11	0
21	Moritz Seiffert	(Germany)	DF	4 November 2000 (age 26)	Erzgebirge Aue	2026	2028	11	0
24	Mark Gevorgyan	(Armenia)	DF	1 June 2005 (age 21)	Hannover 96 II	2026	2028	11	0
33	Lasse Faßmann	(Germany)	DF	6 June 2006 (age 20)	Academy	2025		30	0
34	Edon Krasniqi	(Kosovo)	DF	2 April 2008 (age 18)	Academy	2026	2028	3	0
39	Ludwig Estermann	(Germany)	DF	6 February 2008 (age 18)	Academy	2026	2028	1	0
47	Lance Fiedler	(Germany)	DF	6 February 2007 (age 19)	Academy	2025	2028	20	4
Midfielders
5	Mathew Collins	(England)	MF	1 December 2004 (age 21)	Austria Salzburg	2026	2027	5	0
8	Raphael Wach	(Germany)	MF	14 August 2003 (age 23)	Tennis Borussia Berlin	2025		20	0
10	Tunay Deniz	(Germany)	MF	2 February 1994 (age 32)	Hallescher FC	2024	2027	62	14
13	Michael Eberwein	(Germany)	MF	11 March 1996 (age 30)	Borussia Dortmund II	2026	2028	17	7
14	Dennis Dressel	(Germany)	MF	26 October 1998 (age 28)	SSV Ulm 1846	2026	2028	141	18
18	Eric Uhlmann	(Germany)	MF	5 January 2003 (age 23)	Erzgebirge Aue	2026		9	1
25	Damjan Dordan	(Bosnia and Herzegovina)	MF	11 January 2003 (age 23)	Academy	2025	2028	17	0
27	Raphael Ott	(Germany)	MF	15 December 2005 (age 20)	Viktoria Köln	2026		27	8
Forwards
7	Florian Niederlechner	(Germany)	FW	24 October 1990 (age 36)	Hertha BSC	2025		50	10
9	Fabio Wagner	(Germany)	FW	9 December 2006 (age 19)	Academy	2026		19	2
11	Brahim Moumou	(Germany)	FW	6 May 2001 (age 25)	DAC 1904	2024		5	0
12	Ortivero Calderon	(Germany)	FW	25 September 2007 (age 19)	Academy	2026	2028	20	11
17	Cristian Leone	(Italy)	FW	12 January 2005 (age 21)	Academy	2026		15	1
19	Emre Erdoğan	(Turkey)	FW	24 February 2007 (age 19)	Academy	2025	2028	23	3
20	Noah Klose	(Germany)	FW	30 January 2005 (age 21)	Academy	2025		2	0
29	Ron Gosalci	(Germany)	FW	7 February 2006 (age 20)	Academy	2026		2	0
1860 Munich II Players
36	Lucas Grancay	(Germany)	MF	2 February 2006 (age 20)	Academy	2025		1	0
	Mustafa Tekin	(Germany)	MF	3 May 2007 (age 19)	Academy	2026		1	0
	Luis Pereira	(Germany)	FW	1 February 2006 (age 20)	Academy	2026		0	0
Out on loan
Left during the season
22	Loris Husic	(Austria)	MF	17 January 2008 (age 18)	Academy	2025		11	2
44	Samuel Althaus	(Germany)	MF	10 January 2006 (age 20)	Academy	2023		14	2

== Transfers ==
=== In ===
Date	Position	Nationality	Name	From	Fee	Ref.
16 July 2026	DF	(Germany)	Julian Bell	Chemie Leipzig	Undisclosed	
20 July 2026	GK	(Germany)	Vitus Eicher	Unattached	Free	
21 July 2026	DF	(Germany)	Felix Weber	DJK Vilzing	Undisclosed	
24 July 2026	MF	(Germany)	Michael Eberwein	Borussia Dortmund II	Undisclosed	
27 July 2026	MF	(Germany)	Dennis Dressel	SSV Ulm	Undisclosed	
29 July 2026	DF	(Armenia)	Mark Gevorgyan	Hannover 96 II	Undisclosed	
31 July 2026	MF	(England)	Mathew Collins	Austria Salzburg	Undisclosed	
3 August 2026	DF	(Germany)	Moritz Seiffert	Erzgebirge Aue	Undisclosed	
26 August 2026	FW	(Germany)	Raphael Ott	Viktoria Köln	Undisclosed	
31 August 2026	MF	(Germany)	Eric Uhlmann	Erzgebirge Aue	Undisclosed	

=== Out ===
Date	Position	Nationality	Name	To	Fee	Ref.
5 August 2026	MF	(Germany)	Samuel Althaus	Preußen Münster	Undisclosed	
24 August 2026	MF	(Austria)	Loris Husic	Augsburg II	Undisclosed	

=== Released ===
Date	Position	Nationality	Name	Joined	Date	Ref
2 July 2026	FW	(Germany)	Kevin Volland	Retirement		

=== Trial ===
Date from	Position	Nationality	Name	Last club	Date to	Ref.
July 2026	DF	(Armenia)	Mark Gevorgyan	Hannover 96 II	29 July 2026	

== Friendlies ==
20 June 2026	VfB Forstinning	0–4	1860 Munich	Forstinning
14:00 CEST (UTC+2)		Report	Calderon 13', 32', 39'; Tekin 80'	Stadium: Sportpark Forstinning; Attendance: 730; Referee: Thomas Wagner

28 June 2026	FC Sportfreunde Schwaig	1–5	1860 Munich	Oberding
17:00 CEST (UTC+2)	Rohrhirsch 39'	Report	Erdogan 33', 49'; Garza 51'; Grancay 72'; Gosalci 82'	Stadium: NGL Arena

3 July 2026	SV Kay	0–11	1860 Munich	Tittmoning
18:00 CEST (UTC+2)		Report	Husic 6', 18', 35'; Azambuja 13', 24', 44'; Saric 22'; Tekin 41'; Althaus 51', 84'; Erdoğan 77'	Stadium: Sportplatz Lanzing Road; Attendance: 2,221; Referee: Alexander Petzke

5 July 2026	TSV Moorenweis	1–7	1860 Munich	Moorenweis
15:00 CEST (UTC+2)	Dumhard 31'	Report	Husic 10', 41'; Fiedler 13'; Azambuja 15'; Erdoğan 28'; Gosalci 64'; Calderon 89'	Stadium: Sportplatz an der Jahnstrasse; Attendance: 3,000

11 July 2026	FC Deisenhofen	0–2	1860 Munich	Oberhaching
16:00 CEST (UTC+2)		Report	Gosalci 81'; Calderon 86'	Stadium: Deisenhofen Sports Complex; Attendance: 708; Referee: Maximilian Riedel

19 July 2026	TSV Aindling	1–3	1860 Munich	Aindling
15:00 CEST (UTC+2)				Stadium: Schüsselhauser Kreuz

== Competitions ==
=== Overall record ===
Competition	First match	Last match	Starting round	Final position	Record							
Competition	First match	Last match	Starting round	Final position	Pld	W	D	L	GF	GA	GD	Win %
Regionalliga Bayern	1 August 2026		Matchday 1		18	9	7	2	36	22	+14	50.00
DFB-Pokal	22 August 2026	22 August 2026	First Round	First Round	1	0	0	1	0	2	−2	0.00
Bavarian Cup	21 July 2026	1 September 2026	First Round	Third Round	3	2	0	1	11	4	+7	66.67
Total					22	11	7	4	47	28	+19	50.00

Last updated: 14 November 2026
Source: Competitions

=== Regionalliga Bayern ===
==== League table ====
Pos	Team	Pld	W	D	L	GF	GA	GD	Pts	Qualification or relegation
1	FC Memmingen	18	12	3	3	22	9	+13	39	Qualification for promotion play-offs and DFB-Pokal
2	1860 Munich	16	8	6	2	35	22	+13	30	
3	TSV Buchbach	17	8	5	4	33	27	+6	29	
4	SpVgg Unterhaching	17	7	7	3	22	16	+6	28	
5	FV Illertissen	17	7	5	5	32	21	+11	26	
6	SpVgg Bayreuth	17	8	1	8	33	25	+8	25	
7	FC Augsburg II (Note: Reserve teams are ineligible for qualification for the DFB-Pokal.)	17	7	4	6	27	30	−3	25	
8	Bayern Munich II	16	6	6	4	28	22	+6	24	
9	Schwaben Augsburg	17	7	3	7	22	28	−6	24	
10	Wacker Burghausen	17	6	5	6	38	30	+8	23	
11	1. FC Nürnberg II	16	6	3	7	27	23	+4	21	
12	DJK Vilzing	16	5	6	5	24	26	−2	21	
13	VfB Eichstätt	16	6	3	7	18	24	−6	21	
14	1. FC Schweinfurt	17	5	5	7	22	32	−10	20	
15	SC Eltersdorf	16	4	6	6	22	24	−2	18	
16	SpVgg Ansbach	17	4	4	9	16	32	−16	16	Qualification for relegation play-offs
17	TSV Aubstadt	17	3	6	8	20	25	−5	15	Qualification for relegation play-offs
18	Greuther Fürth II	17	3	5	9	19	29	−10	14	Relegation to Bayernliga
19	TSV Landsberg	17	2	7	8	22	37	−15	13	Relegation to Bayernliga

Updated to match(es) played on 7 November 2026. Source: kicker.de
Rules for classification: 1) Points; 2) Goal difference; 3) Goals scored

==== Results summary ====
Overall								Home						Away					
Pld	W	D	L	GF	GA	GD	Pts	W	D	L	GF	GA	GD	W	D	L	GF	GA	GD
18	9	7	2	37	22	+15	34	5	3	1	21	11	+10	4	4	1	16	11	+5

Last updated: 14 November 2026.

==== Results by round ====
Round	1	2	3	4	5	6	7	8	9	10	11	12	13	14	15	16	17	18	19	20	21
Ground	-	A	H	A	A	H	A	H	A	H	A	H	A	H	H	A	H	A	H	-	H
Result	P	D	D	W	W	D	D	W	D	W	L	W	D	W	L	W	W	W	D	P	
Position	11	11	11	10	6	7	10	6	5	3	7	4	3	3	4	4	2	2	2		
Points	0	1	2	5	8	9	10	13	14	17	17	20	21	24	24	27	30	33	34	34	

Updated to match(es) played on 14 November 2026. Source:
A = Away; H = Home; W = Win; D = Draw; L = Loss; P = bye

==== Matches ====
25 July 2026 1	BYE
CEST (UTC+2)

1 August 2026 2	Schweinfurt 05	2–2	1860 Munich	Schweinfurt
14:00 CEST (UTC+2)	Prodanovic 2'; Fery (yellow card) 44'; Dellinger 65'; Özden (yellow card) 69'; Hack (yellow card) 69'; Piwernetz (yellow card) 73'	Report	Eberwein 34'; Bell (yellow card) 64'; Calderon 70'; Gevorgyan (yellow card) 87'	Stadium: Sachs-Stadion; Attendance: 7,567; Referee: Felix Wagner

7 August 2026 3	1860 Munich	2–2	Augsburg II	Munich
19:00 CEST (UTC+2)	Eberwein 15' (pen.); Niederlechner 21'; Eicher (yellow card) 45'	Report	Kastanaras 45'; Hangl (yellow card) 51'; Malaj 74'; Bahn (yellow card) 77'; Bleicher (yellow card) 90'	Stadium: Grünwalder Stadion; Attendance: 15,000; Referee: Johannes Wagner

14 August 2026 4	Memmingen	0–3	1860 Munich	Memmingen
19:00 CEST (UTC+2)	Schmidt (yellow card) 29'; Pfaumann (yellow card) 75'; Remiger (yellow card) 90+3'	Report	Niederlechner 12'; Dressel (yellow card) 25'; Fiedler 57'; Erdoğan (yellow card) 69'; Eberwein 90'; Bell (yellow card) 90+3'	Stadium: Memminger Arena; Attendance: 5,000; Referee: Markus Huber

18 August 2026 5	TSV Aubstadt	2–3	1860 Munich	Aubstadt
19:00 CEST (UTC+2)	Helmer (yellow card) 39' (goal) 78'; Sturm (yellow card) 85'; Nickel 89'; Engel (yellow card) 90+4'	Report	Erdoğan 23'; Wagner 45'; Calderon 83'; Dressel (yellow card) 90+1'	Stadium: NGN-Arena; Attendance: 3,000; Referee: Angelika Söder

30 August 2026 6	1860 Munich	1–1	TSV Landsberg	Munich
15:00 CEST (UTC+2)	Wach (yellow card) 8'; Deniz (yellow card) 9'; Eberwein 15'; Dressel (yellow card) 59'	Report	Leimeister (yellow card) 14'; Pittrich (yellow card) 37'; Kircicek 53'; Bettrich (yellow card) 62'	Stadium: Grünwalder Stadion; Attendance: 15,000; Referee: Christian Dietz

4 September 2026 7	DJK Vilzing	2–2	1860 Munich	Cham
19:00 CEST (UTC+2)	Leipold 55'; Grauschopf (yellow card) 80'; Ziereis 90+3'	Report	Niederlechner 9'; Deniz 63'	Stadium: Manfred-Zollner-Stadion; Attendance: 2,500; Referee: Patrick Krettek

11 September 2026 8	1860 Munich	3–0	Schwaben Augsburg	Munich
19:00 CEST (UTC+2)	Fiedler 10', 35'; Deniz 49'	Report	Krauß (yellow card) 12'	Stadium: Grünwalder Stadion; Attendance: 15,000; Referee: Andreas Dinger

15 September 2026 9	Greuther Fürth II	1–1	1860 Munich	Fürth
19:00 CEST (UTC+2)	Engel 65' (pen.)	Report	Eberwein 7'	Stadium: Konrad-Ammon-Platz; Attendance: 4,825; Referee: Maximilian Riedel

20 September 2026 10	1860 Munich	2–0	1. FC Nürnberg II	Munich
15:00 CEST (UTC+2)	Niederlechner (yellow card) 11'; Deniz 48'; Weber 61'; Erdoğan (yellow card) 84'	Report		Stadium: Grünwalder Stadion; Attendance: 15,000; Referee: Andreas Hummel

26 September 2026 11	Wacker Burghausen	3–1	1860 Munich	Burghausen
14:45 CEST (UTC+2)	Turtschan (yellow card) 17'; Hofherr (yellow card) 27'; Schuhbauer (yellow card) 61' (goal) 76'; Schwarzensteiner (yellow card) 89'	Report	Gevorgyan (yellow card) 34'; Erdoğan (yellow card) 39'; Fiedler (yellow card) 88'; Wagner (yellow card) 90+1'	Stadium: Wacker-Arena; Attendance: 8,828; Referee: Assad Nouhoum

3 October 2026 12	1860 Munich	4–0	SpVgg Ansbach	Munich
14:00 CEST (UTC+2)	Weber 50'; Niederlechner 58'; Wagner 63'; Deniz 79'	Report	Dietrich (yellow card) 24'	Stadium: Grünwalder Stadion; Attendance: 15,000; Referee: Felix Grund

10 October 2026 13	FV Illertissen	1–1	1860 Munich	Illertissen
14:00 CEST (UTC+2)	Neuberger (yellow card) 36'; Hingerl (yellow card) 72'; Milic 83' (yellow card) 87'	Report	Wach (yellow card) 49'; Niederlechner 70'	Stadium: Voehlin-Stadium; Attendance: 4,119; Referee: Maximilian Ziegler

13 October 2026 14	1860 Munich	2–1	SpVgg Bayreuth	Munich
19:00 CEST (UTC+2)	Eberwein 24' (yellow card) 90+1'; Fiedler (yellow card) 57' (yellow-red card) 64'; Uhlmann 80'	Report	Schmidt (yellow card) 50'; Fries (yellow card) 67'; Scheder 68'; Schwarz (yellow card) 78'	Stadium: Grünwalder Stadion; Attendance: 15,000; Referee: Elias Wörz

18 October 2026 15	1860 Munich	2–4	Bayern Munich II	Munich
14:00 CEST (UTC+2)	Leone 28'; Erdoğan 51'; Dressel (yellow card) 73'; Dordan (yellow card) 87'; Weber (yellow card) 90'	Report	Heinz 12', 40'; Binder 23' (yellow card) 24'; Rovere (yellow card) 73'; Degraf 74' (yellow card) 90+2'	Stadium: Grünwalder Stadion; Attendance: 15,000; Referee: Felix Wagner

25 October 2026 16	VfB Eichstätt	0–2	1860 Munich	Eichstätt
14:00 CET (UTC+1)	Schraufstetter (yellow card) 15'; Kuqanaj (yellow card) 82'	Report	Uhlmann (yellow card) 30'; Bösl 50'; Calderon 90+3'	Stadium: Hirsch-Sportpark; Attendance: 2,830; Referee: Marcel Krauß

30 October 2026 17	1860 Munich	4–3	TSV Buchbach	Munich
19:00 CET (UTC+1)	Niederlechner 16'; Weber 28' (yellow card) 86'; Dordan (yellow card) 48'; Calderon 82'; Fiedler 90+5'; Erdoğan (yellow card) 90+5'	Report	Heiland 7', 33'; Bahar 42'; Walter (yellow card) 72'; Erber (yellow card) 84'; Morou (yellow card) 90+2'	Stadium: Grünwalder Stadion; Attendance: 15,000; Referee: Johannes Wagner

8 November 2026 18	Eltersdorf	0–1	1860 Munich	Erlangen
15:00 CET (UTC+1)		Report	Eberwein 33'; Calderon (yellow card) 73'; Dressel (yellow card) 82'	Stadium: ELSNER Sportpark; Attendance: 2,500; Referee: Johannes Hamper

14 November 2026 19	1860 Munich	0–0	SpVgg Unterhaching	Munich
14:00 CET (UTC+1)	Moumou (yellow card) 58'	Report	C.Pfeiffer (yellow card) 65'	Stadium: Grünwalder Stadion; Attendance: 15,000; Referee: Luca Schultze

21 November 2026 20	BYE
CET (UTC+1)

27 November 2026 21	1860 Munich	–	Schweinfurt 05	Munich
19:00 CET (UTC+1)				Stadium: Grünwalder Stadion

=== DFB-Pokal ===
22 August 2026 First Round	1860 Munich	0–2	Holstein Kiel	Munich
18:00 CEST (UTC+2)	Dressel (yellow card) 19'	Report	Therkelsen (yellow card) 20'; Harres 34'; Tolkin (yellow card) 58'; Sekine (yellow card) 74'; Davidsen (yellow card) 87'; Balzi 90+4'	Stadium: Grünwalder Stadion; Attendance: 14,000; Referee: Felix Weller

=== Bavarian Cup ===
21 July 2026 First Round	SV Eintracht Berglern	0–5	1860 Munich	Berglern
17:30 CEST (UTC+2)	Faltlhauser (yellow card) 66'	Report	Niederlechner 9'; Wach 45+1'; Husic 67'; Calderon 78', 79'	Stadium: Berglern Sports Complex; Attendance: 1,384; Referee: Raphael Salzberger

11 August 2026 Second Round	FC Wendelstein 2017	1–5	1860 Munich	Wendelstein
18:00 CEST (UTC+2)	Wild 67'; Hammel (yellow card) 71'	Report	Husic 33'; Calderon 40', 45+2', 85', 89'	Stadium: FV 1923 Wendelstein; Attendance: 1,860; Referee: Davina Lutz

1 September 2026 Third Round	1860 Munich	1–3	TSV Buchbach	Munich
19:00 CEST (UTC+2)	Calderon 54' (pen.); Gevorgyan (yellow card); Dressel (yellow card)	Report	Stoßberger 24'; Bahar 42' (pen.); Gashi 56'; Sztaf (yellow card); Muteba (yellow card); Haas (yellow card); Auerhammer (yellow card)	Stadium: Grünwalder Stadion; Attendance: 6,000; Referee: Wolfgang Haslberger

== Squad statistics ==
As of match played 14 November 2026

=== Appearances and goals ===
Players with no appearances are not included on the list
Italics indicate a loaned in player

No.	Pos	Nat	Player	Total		Regionalliga Bayern		DFB-Pokal		Bavarian Cup	
No.	Pos	Nat	Player	Apps	Goals	Apps	Goals	Apps	Goals	Apps	Goals
1	GK	(Germany) GER	Paul Bachmann	4	0	1	0	0	0	3	0
2	DF	(Germany) GER	Julian Bell	18	0	6+9	0	1	0	2	0
4	DF	(Germany) GER	Felix Weber	16	3	16	3	0	0	0	0
5	MF	(England) ENG	Mathew Collins	5	0	0+4	0	0	0	1	0
6	DF	(Germany) GER	Benedict Hoppe	11	0	3+4	0	1	0	3	0
7	FW	(Germany) GER	Florian Niederlechner	20	7	18	6	1	0	1	1
8	MF	(Germany) GER	Raphael Wach	20	1	9+7	0	0+1	0	2+1	1
9	FW	(Germany) GER	Fabio Wagner	19	2	8+8	2	1	0	2	0
10	MF	(Germany) GER	Tunay Deniz	12	4	9+1	4	1	0	1	0
11	FW	(Germany) GER	Brahim Moumou	5	0	1+2	0	0	0	0+2	0
12	FW	(Germany) GER	Ortivero Calderon	20	11	0+16	4	0+1	0	1+2	7
13	MF	(Germany) GER	Michael Eberwein	17	7	14+1	7	1	0	0+1	0
14	MF	(Germany) GER	Dennis Dressel	18	0	16	0	1	0	1	0
17	FW	(Italy) ITA	Cristian Leone	14	1	6+4	1	0+1	0	3	0
18	MF	(Germany) GER	Eric Uhlmann	9	1	5+4	1	0	0	0	0
19	FW	(Turkey) TUR	Emre Erdoğan	20	3	12+4	3	1	0	2+1	0
20	FW	(Germany) GER	Noah Klose	1	0	0+1	0	0	0	0	0
21	DF	(Germany) GER	Moritz Seiffert	11	0	6+3	0	0+1	0	1	0
24	DF	(Armenia) ARM	Mark Gevorgyan	11	0	7+1	0	0+1	0	2	0
25	MF	(Bosnia and Herzegovina) BIH	Damjan Dordan	5	0	2+3	0	0	0	0	0
27	MF	(Germany) GER	Raphael Ott	9	0	5+3	0	0	0	1	0
29	FW	(Germany) GER	Ron Gosalci	2	0	0+1	0	0	0	0+1	0
30	GK	(Germany) GER	Vitus Eicher	18	0	17	0	1	0	0	0
33	DF	(Germany) GER	Lasse Faßmann	20	0	16	0	1	0	3	0
34	DF	(Kosovo) KOS	Edon Krasniqi	3	0	0	0	0	0	0+3	0
36	MF	(Germany) GER	Lucas Grancay	1	0	0	0	0	0	0+1	0
39	DF	(Germany) GER	Ludwig Estermann	1	0	0	0	0	0	0+1	0
47	DF	(Germany) GER	Lance Fiedler	19	4	15	4	1	0	1+2	0
1860 Munich II Players:
	MF	(Germany) GER	Mustafa Tekin	1	0	0	0	0	0	1	0
Players away on loan:
Players who featured but departed the club permanently during the season:
22	MF	(Austria) AUT	Loris Husic	5	2	2+1	0	0	0	2	2

=== Goal scorers ===
Place	Position	Nation	Number	Name	Regionalliga Bayern	DFB-Pokal	Bavarian Cup	Total
1	FW	(Germany)	12	Ortivero Calderon	4	0	7	11
2	MF	(Germany)	13	Michael Eberwein	7	0	0	7
2	FW	(Germany)	7	Florian Niederlechner	6	0	1	7
4	MF	(Germany)	10	Tunay Deniz	4	0	0	4
4	DF	(Germany)	47	Lance Fiedler	4	0	0	4
6	FW	(Turkey)	19	Emre Erdoğan	3	0	0	3
6	DF	(Germany)	4	Felix Weber	3	0	0	3
8	FW	(Germany)	9	Fabio Wagner	2	0	0	2
8	MF	(Austria)	15	Loris Husic	0	0	2	2
10	MF	(Germany)	18	Eric Uhlmann	1	0	0	1
10	FW	(Italy)	17	Cristian Leone	1	0	0	1
10				Own goal	1	0	0	1
10	MF	(Germany)	5	Raphael Wach	0	0	1	1
Total					36	0	11	47

=== Clean sheets ===
Place	Position	Nation	Number	Name	Regionalliga Bayern	DFB-Pokal	Bavarian Cup	Total
1	GK	(Germany)	30	Vitus Eicher	7	0	0	7
2	GK	(Germany)	1	Paul Bachmann	0	0	1	1
Total					7	0	1	8

=== Disciplinary record ===
Number	Nation	Position	Name	Regionalliga Bayern		DFB-Pokal		Bavarian Cup		Total	
Number	Nation	Position	Name	Yellow card	Red card	Yellow card	Red card	Yellow card	Red card	Yellow card	Red card
2	(Germany)	DF	Julian Bell	2	0	0	0	0	0	2	0
4	(Germany)	DF	Felix Weber	2	0	0	0	0	0	2	0
7	(Germany)	FW	Florian Niederlechner	1	0	0	0	0	0	1	0
8	(Turkey)	MF	Raphael Wach	2	0	0	0	0	0	2	0
9	(Germany)	FW	Fabio Wagner	1	0	0	0	0	0	1	0
10	(Turkey)	MF	Tunay Deniz	1	0	0	0	0	0	1	0
11	(Germany)	FW	Brahim Moumou	1	0	0	0	0	0	1	0
12	(Turkey)	FW	Ortivero Calderon	1	0	0	0	0	0	1	0
13	(Germany)	MF	Michael Eberwein	1	0	0	0	0	0	1	0
14	(Germany)	MF	Dennis Dressel	5	0	1	0	1	0	7	0
18	(Germany)	MF	Eric Uhlmann	1	0	0	0	0	0	1	0
19	(Turkey)	FW	Emre Erdoğan	3	0	0	0	0	0	3	0
24	(Armenia)	DF	Mark Gevorgyan	2	0	0	0	1	0	3	0
25	(Bosnia and Herzegovina)	MF	Damjan Dordan	2	0	0	0	0	0	2	0
30	(Germany)	GK	Vitus Eicher	1	0	0	0	0	0	1	0
47	(Germany)	DF	Lance Fiedler	3	1	0	0	0	0	3	1
Players away on loan:
Players who left 1860 Munich during the season:
Total				29	1	1	0	2	0	32	1
