= 2024–25 Hannover 96 II season =

Hannover 96 II
2024–25 season
- Manager: Daniel Stendel
- Stadiums: Eilenriedestadion; Heinz von Heiden Arena
- 3. Liga: 18th (relegated)
- Top goalscorer: Eric Uhlmann (8)
- Highest home attendance: 11,980; Hannover v Dresden
- Lowest home attendance: 700; Hannover v Ingolstadt
- Average home league attendance: 3,199
- Biggest win: Wiesbaden 1–5 Hannover; Dortmund 0–4 Hannover
- Biggest defeat: Hannover 0–4 Ingolstadt; Essen 5–1 Hannover; Hannover 1–5 Osnabrück
Home colours	Away colours	Third colours

The 2024–25 Hannover 96 II season was the football club's first-ever season in the third flight of German football, the 3. Liga, becoming the first reserve team of a 2. Bundesliga club to play in the 3. Liga.

== Players ==
=== Squad information ===
As of 15 February 2025

Note: Flags indicate national team as defined under FIFA eligibility rules; some limited exceptions apply. Players may hold more than one non-FIFA nationality.

No.	Pos.	Nation	Player
1	GK	GER	Toni Stahl
3	MF	JPN	Hayate Matsuda (on loan from Mito HollyHock)
4	DF	GER	Felix Göttlicher
5	DF	GER	Lukas Dominke
6	MF	GER	Noah Engelbreth
7	MF	SYR	Mustafa Abdullatif
8	FW	GER	Nick Stepantsev
9	FW	GER	Sean Busch
12	GK	GER	Norman Quindt
14	MF	GER	Melkamu Frauendorf
15	DF	GER	Alexander Babitsch
16	MF	GER	Keanu Brandt
17	MF	GER	Michel Dammeier

No.	Pos.	Nation	Player
18	DF	GER	Fynn Arkenberg (captain)
19	FW	LUX	Jayson Videira
20	MF	GER	Nick Elias Meier
21	DF	GER	Jacob Danquah
22	GK	GER	Luca-Joel Grimpe
23	FW	KOS	Valmir Sulejmani
24	MF	GER	Robin Kalem
28	DF	ARM	Mark Gevorgyan
29	FW	GER	Jeremie Niklaus
33	MF	GER	Tim Walbrecht
37	FW	GER	Stefano Marino
42	MF	GER	Ben Westermeier
44	DF	AUT	Lukas Wallner

=== Transfers ===
==== In ====
No.	Pos	Player	From	Type	Window	Ends	Fee	Source
4	DF	(Germany) Felix Göttlicher	(Germany) SV Sandhausen	Transfer	Summer	30 June 2025	Free	
6	MF	(Germany) Noah Engelbreth	(Germany) Union Berlin U19	Transfer	Summer	30 June 2025	Free	
7	MF	(Syria) Mustafa Abdullatif	(Germany) Hertha BSC II	Transfer	Summer	30 June 2026	Free	
11	FW	(Germany) Jorden Winter	(Germany) FSV Luckenwalde	Transfer	Summer	30 June 2025	Free	
12	GK	(Germany) Norman Quindt	Free agent	Transfer	Summer	30 June 2025	–	
13	FW	(Germany) Tom Sanne	(Germany) Hamburger SV	Loan	Summer	30 June 2025	Free	
14	MF	(Germany) Melkamu Frauendorf	(England) Liverpool	Transfer	Summer	30 June 2026	Free	
24	MF	(Germany) Robin Kalem	(Switzerland) Grasshopper	Transfer	Summer	30 June 2026	Free	
28	DF	(Armenia) Mark Gevorgyan	(Austria) FC Liefering	Transfer	Summer	30 June 2026	Free	
37	FW	(Germany) Stefano Marino	(Germany) Karlsruher SC	Transfer	Summer	30 June 2026	Free	
42	MF	(Germany) Ben Westermeier	(Germany) SpVgg Unterhaching	Transfer	Summer	30 June 2025	Free	
44	DF	(Austria) Lukas Wallner	(Austria) FC Liefering	Transfer	Summer	30 June 2025	Free	
23	FW	(Kosovo) Valmir Sulejmani	Free agent	Transfer	Winter	30 June 2025	–	

==== Out ====
No.	Pos	Player	To	Type	Window	Fee	Source
1	GK	(Germany) Liam Tiernan	(Germany) VfB Oldenburg	End of contract	Summer	–	
2	DF	(Germany) Luis Podolski	(Germany) Kickers Emden	Transfer	Summer	Free	
4	DF	(Germany) Fynn Henze	(Germany) 1. FC Magdeburg II	End of contract	Summer	–	
6	MF	(Kosovo) Adem Podrimaj	(Germany) VfB Oldenburg	End of contract	Summer	–	
7	MF	(Germany) Joyce Luyeye-Nkula	(Germany) Hessen Kassel	End of contract	Summer	–	
9	FW	(Germany) Theo Schröder	(Germany) FC St. Pauli II	Transfer	Summer	Free	
11	FW	(South Korea) Ha-neul Jo	Retirement	Contract terminated	Summer	–	
13	MF	(The Gambia) Mamin Sanyang	(Poland) GKS Tychy	Transfer	Summer	Free	
19	FW	(Germany) Lennart Garlipp	(Germany) Fortuna Düsseldorf II	Transfer	Summer	Free	
20	FW	(Bosnia and Herzegovina) Marin Popović	Free agent	End of contract	Summer	–	
21	DF	(Germany) Lorenz Hollenbach	(Germany) Greifswalder FC	End of contract	Summer	–	
23	MF	(Germany) Luis Hesse	Free agent	End of contract	Summer	–	
24	MF	(Cyprus) Antonio Foti	(Germany) Eintracht Frankfurt	End of loan	Summer	–	
26	DF	(Canada) Micah Chisholm	Free agent	End of contract	Summer	–	
27	MF	(France) Tom Moustier	(Germany) Rot-Weiss Essen	Transfer	Summer	Free	
28	MF	(Germany) Adrian Becker	(Germany) Germania Egestorf/Langreder	End of contract	Summer	–	
35	DF	(Germany) Yannik Lührs	(Germany) Borussia Dortmund II	Transfer	Summer	€350,000	
–	MF	(Germany) Muhammed Damar	(Germany) TSG Hoffenheim	End of loan	Summer	–	
–	MF	(Germany) Christopher Scott	(Belgium) Antwerp	End of loan	Summer	–	
11	FW	(Germany) Jorden Winter	(Germany) Holstein Kiel II	Transfer	Winter	Free	
13	FW	(Germany) Tom Sanne	(Germany) Hamburger SV	End of loan	Winter	–	

== Friendly matches ==
Win Draw Loss

6 July 2024 Friendly	SC Paderborn II (Germany)	2–4	(Germany) Hannover 96 II	Paderborn
12:00 CEST (UTC+2)	Goal	Report	Woudstra; Abdullatif; Meier	Stadium: NLZ Platz 4

13 July 2024 Friendly	VSG Altglienicke (Germany)	2–1	(Germany) Hannover 96 II	Berlin
15:00 CEST (UTC+2)	McLemore 24'; Bokake 90'	Report (Altglienicke); Report (Hannover)	Busch (pen.)	Stadium: Sportplatz an der Dörpfeldstraße 89

17 July 2024 Friendly	Hannover 96 II (Germany)	1–2	(Germany) Kickers Emden	Hanover
19:00 CEST (UTC+2)	Martins Marques 85'	Report	Schiller 58'; Steffens 90'	Stadium: 96-Akademie, Rasenplatz 2

20 July 2024 Friendly	Hannover 96 II (Germany)	1–4	(England) Milton Keynes Dons	Hanover
13:00 CEST (UTC+2)	31' (pen.)	Report	Dennis 57', 77' (pen.); Sherring 64'; Waller 90'	Stadium: Eilenriedestadion; Attendance: 0

23 July 2024 Friendly	Germania Egestorf/Langreder (Germany)	1–1	(Germany) Hannover 96 II	Barsinghausen
18:30 CEST (UTC+2)	Milan 77'	Report	Eichinger 41'	Stadium: Stadion an der Ammerke

27 July 2024 Friendly	Energie Cottbus (Germany)	0–3	(Germany) Hannover 96 II	Cottbus
14:00 CEST (UTC+2)		Report	Chakroun 4'; Besuschkow 15'; Sanne 58'	Stadium: LEAG Energie Stadion; Attendance: 1,357; Referee: Jakob Scheibner

16 August 2024 Friendly	Hannover 96 II (Germany)	6–1	(Germany) Werder Bremen II	Hanover
14:00 CEST (UTC+2)	Ndikom; Oudenne; Westermeier	Report	Goal	Stadium: Eilenriedestadion; Attendance: 0

5 September 2024 Friendly	Hannover 96 II (Germany)	4–2	(Germany) 1. FC Magdeburg II	Hanover
	Sanne 5'; Brandt 20'; Arkenberg 22'; Marino 65'	Report	Kuhinja 88'; Hink 90+2'	Stadium: 96-Akademie; Attendance: 0 Referee: Alexander Roj

10 October 2024 Friendly	Hannover 96 II (Germany)	4–4	(Germany) SV Babelsberg	Hanover
14:00 CEST (UTC+2)	Sanne 19', 26'; Stepantsev 70', 83'	Report	Werbelow 22'; Bachmann 29'; Lang 72'; Didoss 90' (pen.)	Stadium: Eilenriedestadion; Attendance: 0

15 November 2024 Friendly	Hannover 96 II (Germany)	1–1	(Germany) FC Eilenburg	Hanover
19:00 CET (UTC+1)		Report		Stadium: Eilenriedestadion

8 January 2025 Friendly	Hannover 96 II (Germany)	2–3	(Germany) Sportfreunde Lotte	Hanover
14:00 CET (UTC+1)	Marino 3'; Kalem 27'	Report	Elezi 15'; Heider 45'; Addai 70'	Stadium: 96-Akademie

11 January 2025 Friendly	Hannover 96 II (Germany)	9–0	(Germany) Teutonia Ottensen	Hanover
13:00 CET (UTC+1)	Busch; Marino; Engelbreth; Kalem; Husser; Stepantsev; Winter	Report		Stadium: 96-Akademie

== Competitions ==
Win Draw Loss

=== Overview ===
Competition	First match	Last match	Starting round	Final position	Record							
Competition	First match	Last match	Starting round	Final position	Pld	W	D	L	GF	GA	GD	Win %
3. Liga	3 August 2024	17 May 2025	Matchday 1	18th	38	9	10	19	51	70	−19	23.68
Total					38	9	10	19	51	70	−19	23.68

Source: Competitions

=== 3. Liga ===
==== League table ====
Pos	Team	Pld	W	D	L	GF	GA	GD	Pts	Promotion, qualification or relegation
16	Waldhof Mannheim	38	11	13	14	43	45	−2	46	
17	Borussia Dortmund II (Note: Reserve teams are ineligible for promotion or DFB-Pokal qualification.) (R)	38	11	10	17	53	60	−7	43	Relegation to Regionalliga
18	Hannover 96 II (R)	38	9	10	19	51	70	−19	37	Relegation to Regionalliga
19	SV Sandhausen (R)	38	9	8	21	49	69	−20	35	Relegation to Regionalliga
20	SpVgg Unterhaching (R)	38	4	13	21	40	72	−32	25	Relegation to Regionalliga

Source: DFB
Rules for classification: 1) Points; 2) Goal difference; 3) Goals scored; 4) Head-to-head results; 5) Head-to-head away goals scored; 6) Away goals scored; 7) Play-off.
(R) Relegated

==== Results summary ====
Overall								Home						Away					
Pld	W	D	L	GF	GA	GD	Pts	W	D	L	GF	GA	GD	W	D	L	GF	GA	GD
38	9	10	19	51	70	−19	37	5	5	9	25	38	−13	4	5	10	26	32	−6

Source: DFB

==== Results by round ====
Round	1	2	3	4	5	6	7	8	9	10	11	12	13	14	15	16	17	18	19	20	21	22	23	24	25	26	27	28	29	30	31	32	33	34	35	36	37	38
Ground	A	H	A	H	A	H	A	H	H	A	H	A	A	H	A	H	A	H	A	H	A	H	A	H	A	H	A	A	H	A	H	H	A	H	A	H	A	H
Result	L	L	W	L	D	L	L	W	D	W	L	L	D	L	L	W	W	L	L	W	L	D	L	L	L	L	L	D	W	D	L	D	D	D	W	D	L	W
Position	13	18	16	17	16	20	20	18	19	15	17	18	17	18	19	18	17	17	17	16	17	17	19	19	19	19	19	19	19	19	19	19	19	19	18	18	19	18

Source: DFB
A = Away; H = Home; W = Win; D = Draw; L = Loss

==== Matches ====
3 August 2024 1	Erzgebirge Aue	2–1	Hannover 96 II	Aue-Bad Schlema
14:00 CEST (UTC+2)	Stefaniak 9'; Bär 22'	Report	Sanne 15'	Stadium: Erzgebirgsstadion; Attendance: 6,867; Referee: Leonidas Exuzidis

11 August 2024 2	Hannover 96 II	1–3	Rot-Weiss Essen	Hanover
13:30 CEST (UTC+2)	Chakroun 38'	Report	Brumme 27', 47'; Vonić 53'	Stadium: Heinz von Heiden Arena; Attendance: 4,400; Referee: Yannick Rupert

24 August 2024 3	SV Sandhausen	0–1	Hannover 96 II	Sandhausen
14:00 CEST (UTC+2)		Report	Wallner 21'	Stadium: GP Stadion am Hardtwald; Attendance: 2,489; Referee: Assad Nouhoum

1 September 2024 4	Hannover 96 II	1–2	SC Verl	Hanover
19:30 CEST (UTC+2)	Busch 82'	Report	Gayret 30'; Arweiler 33'	Stadium: Heinz von Heiden Arena; Attendance: 2,000; Referee: Felix Grund

14 September 2024 5	VfL Osnabrück	1–1	Hannover 96 II	Osnabrück
16:30 CEST (UTC+2)	Beermann 2'	Report	Oudenne 52'	Stadium: Stadion an der Bremer Brücke; Attendance: 14,447; Referee: Jarno Wienefeld

22 September 2024 6	Hannover 96 II	1–3	1. FC Saarbrücken	Hanover
13:30 CEST (UTC+2)	Sanne 90+3'	Report	Brünker 5', 38'; Neudecker 67'	Stadium: Heinz von Heiden Arena; Attendance: 2,100; Referee: Marc Philip Eckermann

25 September 2024 7	1860 Munich	1–0	Hannover 96 II	Munich
19:00 CEST (UTC+2)	Hobsch 41'	Report		Stadium: Grünwalder Stadion; Attendance: 15,000; Referee: Martin Wilke

28 September 2024 8	Hannover 96 II	3–1	VfB Stuttgart II	Hanover
14:00 CEST (UTC+2)	Uhlmann 8'; Chakroun 58'; Videira 90+2'	Report	Faghir 70'	Stadium: Eilenriedestadion; Attendance: 1,100; Referee: Tobias Wittmann

6 October 2024 9	Hannover 96 II	0–0	Energie Cottbus	Hanover
13:30 CEST (UTC+2)		Report		Stadium: Heinz von Heiden Arena; Attendance: 3,300; Referee: Leonidas Exuzidis

19 October 2024 10	Wehen Wiesbaden	1–5	Hannover 96 II	Wiesbaden
14:00 CEST (UTC+2)	Kaya 17'	Report	Kalem 2', 29'; Chakroun 31'; Stepantsev 43' (pen.); Marino 65'	Stadium: BRITA-Arena; Attendance: 3,021; Referee: Felix Weller

23 October 2024 11	Hannover 96 II	1–4	Arminia Bielefeld	Hanover
19:00 CEST (UTC+2)	Meier 64'	Report	Kania 2', 42', 82'; Biankadi 88'	Stadium: Heinz von Heiden Arena; Attendance: 8,200; Referee: Assad Nouhoum

26 October 2024 12	Dynamo Dresden	2–1	Hannover 96 II	Dresden
14:00 CEST (UTC+2)	Meißner 79'; Batista Meier 90+2'	Report	Wallner 17'	Stadium: Rudolf-Harbig-Stadion; Attendance: 26,055; Referee: Cristian Ballweg

2 November 2024 13	Alemannia Aachen	0–0	Hannover 96 II	Aachen
16:30 CET (UTC+1)		Report		Stadium: Tivoli; Attendance: 23,500; Referee: Jarno Wienefeld

10 November 2024 14	Hannover 96 II	0–4	FC Ingolstadt	Hanover
13:30 CET (UTC+1)		Report	Kanuric 14'; Lorenz 24'; Grønning 39'; Zeitler 57'	Stadium: Heinz von Heiden Arena; Attendance: 700; Referee: Michael Näther

24 November 2024 15	Waldhof Mannheim	2–1	Hannover 96 II	Mannheim
13:30 CET (UTC+1)	Rieckmann 31'; Benatelli 74'	Report	Sanne 33'	Stadium: Carl-Benz-Stadion; Attendance: 9,376; Referee: Leonidas Exuzidis

30 November 2024 16	Hannover 96 II	2–0	Borussia Dortmund II	Hanover
14:00 CET (UTC+1)	Uhlmann 18' (pen.); Westermeier 80'	Report		Stadium: Eilenriedestadion; Attendance: 1,200; Referee: Luca Jürgensen

7 December 2024 17	SpVgg Unterhaching	1–2	Hannover 96 II	Unterhaching
14:00 CET (UTC+1)	Kügel 77'	Report	Kalem 64', 66'	Stadium: Uhlsport Park; Attendance: 3,536; Referee: Marc Philip Eckermann

14 December 2024 18	Hannover 96 II	1–2	Viktoria Köln	Hanover
14:00 CET (UTC+1)	Uhlmann 90+5'	Report	El Mala 67'; Güler 72' (pen.)	Stadium: Eilenriedestadion; Attendance: 1,060; Referee: Fabienne Michel

22 December 2024 19	Hansa Rostock	1–0	Hannover 96 II	Rostock
19:30 CET (UTC+1)	Kinsombi 90'	Report		Stadium: Ostseestadion; Attendance: 29,000; Referee: Justin Hasmann

17 January 2025 20	Hannover 96 II	2–1	Erzgebirge Aue	Hanover
19:00 CET (UTC+1)	Marino 32'; Brandt 70'	Report	Bär 11'	Stadium: Eilenriedestadion; Attendance: 1,636; Referee: Yannick Rupert

26 January 2025 21	Rot-Weiss Essen	5–1	Hannover 96 II	Essen
13:30 CET (UTC+1)	Ríos Alonso 9'; Brumme 15', 30'; Kraulich 43', 90'	Report	Gindorf 44'	Stadium: Stadion an der Hafenstraße; Attendance: 15,037; Referee: Mario Hildenbrand

2 February 2025 22	Hannover 96 II	2–2	SV Sandhausen	Hanover
19:30 CET (UTC+1)	Matsuda 64'; Wallner 90+6'	Report	Otto 54'; Greil 59'	Stadium: Eilenriedestadion; Attendance: 920; Referee: Tobias Wittmann

9 February 2025 23	SC Verl	1–0	Hannover 96 II	Verl
16:30 CET (UTC+1)	Probst 65'	Report		Stadium: Sportclub Arena; Attendance: 2,298; Referee: Martin Speckner

15 February 2025 24	Hannover 96 II	1–5	VfL Osnabrück	Hanover
14:00 CET (UTC+1)	Chakroun 53'	Report	Niehoff 29'; Kayo 37', 88'; Goguadze 75', 82'	Stadium: Eilenriedestadion; Attendance: 3,200; Referee: Luca Jürgensen

22 February 2025 25	1. FC Saarbrücken	4–1	Hannover 96 II	Saarbrücken
16:30 CET (UTC+1)	Rizzuto 17'; Feiertag 48'; Rabihic 67'; Krüger 80'	Report	Sonnenberg 34' (o.g.)	Stadium: Ludwigsparkstadion; Attendance: 11,330; Referee: Felix Wagner

1 March 2025 26	Hannover 96 II	1–3	1860 Munich	Hanover
14:00 CET (UTC+1)	Sulejmani 27'	Report	Deniz 66'; Guttau 70'; Hobsch 76'	Stadium: Eilenriedestadion; Attendance: 2,925; Referee: Felix Weller

8 March 2025 27	VfB Stuttgart II	2–1	Hannover 96 II	Aspach
14:00 CET (UTC+1)	Kastanaras 13'; Sankoh 85' (pen.)	Report	Uhlmann 33'	Stadium: WIRmachenDRUCK Arena; Attendance: 750; Referee: Martin Wilke

11 March 2025 28	Energie Cottbus	2–2	Hannover 96 II	Cottbus
19:00 CET (UTC+1)	Engelhardt 20'; Copado 34'	Report	Sulejmani 31'; Uhlmann 53'	Stadium: LEAG Energie Stadion; Attendance: 9,233; Referee: Felix Grund

15 March 2025 29	Hannover 96 II	3–2	Wehen Wiesbaden	Hanover
14:00 CET (UTC+1)	Brandt 53'; Luckeneder 58' (o.g.); Oudenne 64'	Report	Flotho 66'; Agrafiotis 87'	Stadium: Eilenriedestadion; Attendance: 900; Referee: Yannick Rupert

29 March 2025 30	Arminia Bielefeld	2–2	Hannover 96 II	Bielefeld
16:30 CET (UTC+1)	Kania 7' (pen.); Corboz 86'	Report	Oudenne 44', 80'	Stadium: SchücoArena; Attendance: 23,591; Referee: Tobias Wittmann

4 April 2025 31	Hannover 96 II	2–3	Dynamo Dresden	Hanover
19:00 CEST (UTC+2)	Sulejmani 40'; Uhlmann 86'	Report	Kother 20', 28'; Daferner 55' (pen.)	Stadium: Heinz von Heiden Arena; Attendance: 11,980; Referee: Assad Nouhoum

8 April 2025 32	Hannover 96 II	1–1	Alemannia Aachen	Hanover
19:00 CEST (UTC+2)	Uhlmann 76' (pen.)	Report	Benschop 51'	Stadium: Heinz von Heiden Arena; Attendance: 2,808; Referee: Michael Näther

12 April 2025 33	FC Ingolstadt	3–3	Hannover 96 II	Ingolstadt
14:00 CEST (UTC+2)	Zeitler 72'; Malone 80', 90+6'	Report	Sulejmani 11'; Kalem 58'; Busch 82'	Stadium: Audi Sportpark; Attendance: 4,391; Referee: Jarno Wienefeld

20 April 2025 34	Hannover 96 II	1–1	Waldhof Mannheim	Hanover
16:30 CEST (UTC+2)	Sulejmani 45+2'	Report	Lohkemper 19'	Stadium: Eilenriedestadion; Attendance: 1,478; Referee: Cristian Ballweg

26 April 2025 35	Borussia Dortmund II	0–4	Hannover 96 II	Dortmund
14:00 CEST (UTC+2)		Report	Uhlmann 36' (pen.); Kalem 38', 52'; Busch 78'	Stadium: Stadion Rote Erde; Attendance: 1,541; Referee: Nico Fuchs

4 May 2025 36	Hannover 96 II	0–0	SpVgg Unterhaching	Hanover
19:30 CEST (UTC+2)		Report		Stadium: Eilenriedestadion; Attendance: 946; Referee: Leonidas Exuzidis

11 May 2025 37	Viktoria Köln	2–0	Hannover 96 II	Cologne
19:30 CEST (UTC+2)	Lobinger 61'; El Mala 74'	Report		Stadium: Sportpark Höhenberg; Attendance: 2,897; Referee: Martin Wilke

17 May 2025 38	Hannover 96 II	2–1	Hansa Rostock	Hanover
13:30 CEST (UTC+2)	Engelbreth 62'; Rossipal 75' (o.g.)	Report	Kinsombi 64'	Stadium: Heinz von Heiden Arena; Attendance: 9,931; Referee: Felix Wagner

== Statistics ==
=== Appearances and goals ===
No.	Pos	Nat	Player	Total		3. Liga	
No.	Pos	Nat	Player	Apps	Goals	Apps	Goals
1	GK	(Germany) GER	Toni Stahl	18	0	18	0
2	FW	(Lebanon) LBN	Husseyn Chakroun	20	4	20	4
3	MF	(Japan) JPN	Hayate Matsuda	34	1	34	1
4	DF	(Germany) GER	Felix Göttlicher	7	0	5+2	0
5	DF	(Germany) GER	Lukas Dominke	14	0	9+5	0
6	MF	(Germany) GER	Noah Engelbreth	24	1	13+11	1
7	MF	(Syria) SYR	Mustafa Abdullatif	26	0	17+9	0
8	FW	(Germany) GER	Nick Stepantsev	13	1	6+7	1
9	FW	(Germany) GER	Sean Busch	22	3	9+13	3
10	DF	(Germany) GER	Eric Uhlmann	30	8	30	8
11	MF	(Germany) GER	Noël Aséko Nkili	10	0	10	0
11	FW	(Germany) GER	Jorden Winter	2	0	0+2	0
12	GK	(Germany) GER	Norman Quindt	1	0	1	0
13	FW	(Germany) GER	Tom Sanne	17	3	7+10	3
14	MF	(Germany) GER	Melkamu Frauendorf	24	0	4+20	0
15	DF	(Germany) GER	Alexander Babitsch	1	0	0+1	0
16	MF	(Germany) GER	Keanu Brandt	27	2	18+9	2
17	MF	(Germany) GER	Michel Dammeier	21	0	9+12	0
18	DF	(Germany) GER	Fynn Arkenberg	30	0	27+3	0
19	FW	(Luxembourg) LUX	Jayson Videira	14	1	2+12	1
20	MF	(Germany) GER	Nick Elias Meier	13	1	6+7	1
21	DF	(Germany) GER	Jacob Danquah	1	0	0+1	0
22	GK	(Germany) GER	Luca-Joel Grimpe	1	0	0+1	0
23	MF	(Germany) GER	Max Besuschkow	2	0	2	0
23	FW	(Kosovo) KOS	Valmir Sulejmani	14	5	14	5
24	MF	(Germany) GER	Robin Kalem	35	7	23+12	7
25	MF	(Germany) GER	Lars Gindorf	2	1	2	1
26	MF	(Germany) GER	Montell Ndikom	17	0	6+11	0
27	MF	(Sweden) SWE	Kolja Oudenne	11	4	11	4
28	DF	(Armenia) ARM	Mark Gevorgyan	2	0	0+2	0
29	FW	(Germany) GER	Jeremie Niklaus	12	0	10+2	0
30	GK	(Germany) GER	Leon-Oumar Wechsel	17	0	17	0
31	FW	(Germany) GER	Denis Husser	7	0	0+7	0
32	FW	(Germany) GER	Thaddäus-Monju Momuluh	3	0	3	0
33	MF	(Germany) GER	Tim Walbrecht	12	0	11+1	0
36	DF	(Germany) GER	Kenneth Schmidt	7	0	7	0
37	FW	(Germany) GER	Stefano Marino	28	2	13+15	2
38	DF	(Germany) GER	Brooklyn Ezeh	4	0	4	0
40	GK	(Germany) GER	Leo Weinkauf	2	0	2	0
42	MF	(Germany) GER	Ben Westermeier	29	1	23+6	1
44	DF	(Austria) AUT	Lukas Wallner	25	3	24+1	3

=== Goalscorers ===
Rank	No.	Pos	Name	Goals
1	10	DF	(Germany) Eric Uhlmann	8
2	24	MF	(Germany) Robin Kalem	7
3	23	FW	(Kosovo) Valmir Sulejmani	5
4	2	FW	(Lebanon) Husseyn Chakroun	4
4	27	MF	(Sweden) Kolja Oudenne	4
6	9	FW	(Germany) Sean Busch	3
6	13	FW	(Germany) Tom Sanne	3
6	44	DF	(Austria) Lukas Wallner	3
9	16	FW	(Germany) Keanu Brandt	2
9	37	FW	(Germany) Stefano Marino	2
11	3	MF	(Japan) Hayate Matsuda	1
11	6	MF	(Germany) Noah Engelbreth	1
11	8	FW	(Germany) Nick Stepantsev	1
11	19	FW	(Luxembourg) Jayson Videira	1
11	20	MF	(Germany) Nick Elias Meier	1
11	25	MF	(Germany) Lars Gindorf	1
11	42	MF	(Germany) Ben Westermeier	1
Own goals				3
Total				51

=== Clean sheets ===
Rank	No.	Pos	Name	Clean sheets
1	1	GK	(Germany) Toni Stahl	3
1	30	GK	(Germany) Leon-Oumar Wechsel	3
Total				6

=== Disciplinary record ===
Rank	No.	Pos	Name	Cards		
Rank	No.	Pos	Name	Booked	(yellow card) (yellow-red card)	Sent off (straight red)
1	44	DF	(Austria) Lukas Wallner	11	0	0
2	2	FW	(Lebanon) Husseyn Chakroun	4	2	0
3	10	DF	(Germany) Eric Uhlmann	9	0	0
3	20	MF	(Germany) Nick Elias Meier	4	0	1
5	16	MF	(Germany) Keanu Brandt	8	0	0
6	3	MF	(Japan) Hayate Matsuda	4	1	0
6	42	MF	(Germany) Ben Westermeier	7	0	0
8	18	DF	(Germany) Fynn Arkenberg	6	0	0
8	23	FW	(Kosovo) Valmir Sulejmani	1	0	1
8	33	MF	(Germany) Tim Walbrecht	6	0	0
8	37	FW	(Germany) Stefano Marino	6	0	0
12	11	MF	(Germany) Noël Aséko Nkili	2	1	0
12	17	MF	(Germany) Michel Dammeier	5	0	0
14	6	MF	(Germany) Noah Engelbreth	4	0	0
14	24	MF	(Germany) Robin Kalem	4	0	0
16	5	DF	(Germany) Lukas Dominke	3	0	0
16	7	MF	(Syria) Mustafa Abdullatif	3	0	0
16	30	GK	(Germany) Leon-Oumar Wechsel	3	0	0
16	38	DF	(Germany) Brooklyn Ezeh	3	0	0
20	9	FW	(Germany) Sean Busch	2	0	0
20	23	MF	(Germany) Max Besuschkow	2	0	0
20	26	MF	(Germany) Montell Ndikom	2	0	0
20	29	FW	(Germany) Jeremie Niklaus	2	0	0
24	4	DF	(Germany) Felix Göttlicher	1	0	0
24	14	MF	(Germany) Melkamu Frauendorf	1	0	0
24	19	FW	(Luxembourg) Jayson Videira	1	0	0
24	27	MF	(Sweden) Kolja Oudenne	1	0	0
24	28	DF	(Armenia) Mark Gevorgyan	1	0	0
24	36	DF	(Germany) Kenneth Schmidt	1	0	0
Total				107	4	2

== See also ==
- 2024–25 Hannover 96 season
