= Melkamu Frauendorf =

German footballer (born 2004)

Personal information
- Full name: Melkamu Benjamin Daniel Frauendorf
- Date of birth: 12 January 2004 (age 22)
- Place of birth: Kembata, Ethiopia
- Height: 1.80 m (5 ft 11 in)
- Position: Midfielder

Team information
- Current team: Stuttgarter Kickers
- Number: 14

Youth career
- –2020: 1899 Hoffenheim
- 2020–2022: Liverpool

Senior career*
Years	Team	Apps	(Gls)
2022–2024	Liverpool	0	(0)
2024–2025	Hannover 96 II	24	(0)
2025–	Stuttgarter Kickers	37	(4)

International career
2019	Germany U15	2	(0)
2019	Germany U16	4	(0)
2021–2022	Germany U18	3	(1)
2022–2023	Germany U19	6	(0)
- * Club domestic league appearances and goals as of 24 September 2026

Melkamu Benjamin Daniel Frauendorf (born 12 January 2004) is a footballer who plays as a midfielder for Regionalliga Südwest side Stuttgarter Kickers. Born in Ethiopia, he represents Germany at youth level.

== Club career ==
Frauendorf joined Liverpool in 2020, after previously playing for 1899 Hoffenheim, where he scored 7 goals in 40 games for the U17 team.

He made his competitive first-team debut in an FA Cup third round match against Shrewsbury Town on 9 January 2022.

On 9 November 2022, he started his first game for Liverpool in the win against Derby County in the third round of the EFL Cup at Anfield.

On 5 June 2024, Liverpool announced that Frauendorf, along with 7 other academy players, would be released at the end of the 2023–24 season. He subsequently joined 3. Liga side Hannover 96 II. In July 2025, he moved to Stuttgarter Kickers.

== International career ==
Frauendorf is eligible to play for Ethiopia and Germany, and has been capped at various youth international levels for the latter.

== Personal life ==
Frauendorf's brother, Melesse, is also a footballer, who came through the academy at Hoffenheim with Melkamu and who now plays for TuS Mechtersheim.

== Career statistics ==
=== Club ===
As of 1 July 2024

Appearances and goals by club, season and competition
Club	Season	League			National cup		League cup		Europe		Other		Total	
Club	Season	Division	Apps	Goals	Apps	Goals	Apps	Goals	Apps	Goals	Apps	Goals	Apps	Goals
Liverpool	2021–22	Premier League	0	0	1	0	0	0	0	0	0	0	1	0
Liverpool	2022–23	Premier League	0	0	0	0	1	0	0	0	0	0	1	0
Liverpool	2023–24	Premier League	0	0	0	0	0	0	0	0	0	0	0	0
Liverpool	Total		0	0	1	0	1	0	0	0	0	0	2	0
Hannover 96 II	2024–25	3. Liga	0	0	–		–		–		–		0	0
Career total			0	0	1	0	1	0	0	0	0	0	2	0
