= Husseyn Chakroun =

Footballer (born 2004)

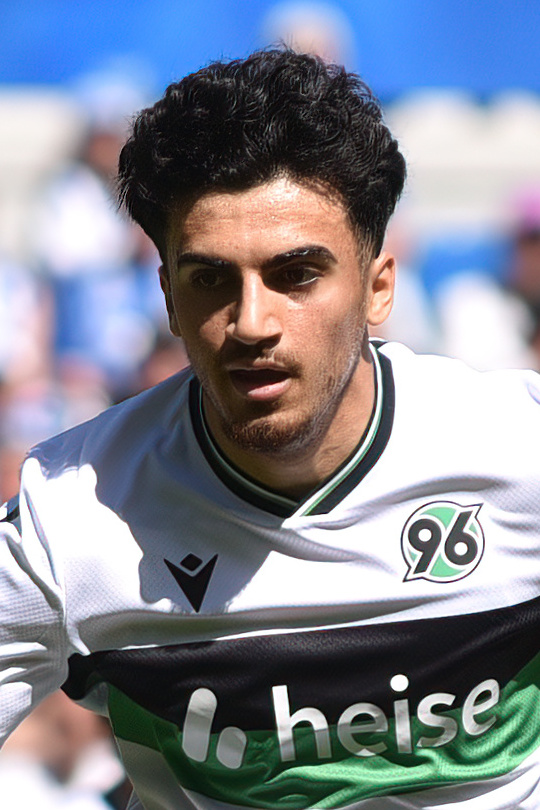
- Chakroun with Hannover 96 in 2026

Personal information
- Full name: Husseyn Zakaria Chakroun
- Date of birth: 10 November 2004 (age 22)
- Place of birth: Hanover, Germany
- Height: 1.74 m (5 ft 9 in)
- Position: Winger

Team information
- Current team: Hannover 96
- Number: 14

Youth career
- Fortuna Sachsenross
- Eintracht Braunschweig
- –2022: HSC Hannover
- 2022–2023: JFV Calenberger Land

Senior career*
Years	Team	Apps	(Gls)
2023–2025	Hannover 96 II	52	(12)
2025–	Hannover 96	29	(4)

International career^{‡}
2024–	Lebanon	10	(5)
- * Club domestic league appearances and goals as of 1 November 2026 ‡ National team caps and goals as of 17 November 2026

Husseyn Zakaria Chakroun (Arabic: حسين زكريا شكرون, Lebanese Arabic pronunciation: [ħ(u)seːn zakaˈrijja ʃakaˈruːn]; born 10 November 2004) is a professional footballer who plays as a winger for 2. Bundesliga club Hannover 96. Born in Germany, he plays for the Lebanon national team.

== Club career ==
=== Youth ===
Chakroun began his youth career at Fortuna Sachsenross, which he joined at age five. He grew up playing football on the streets and at the football pitch at Welfenplatz in the List quarter of Hanover. Chakroun later joined the youth system of Eintracht Braunschweig, after being released by Fortuna Sachsenross. He then moved to HSC Hannover, where he played until his first year of under-19 football. During the winter of 2021–22, Chakroun joined JFV Calenberger Land's under-19 team, where he spent one season. He was brought to the club by coach Timo Struckmeier, who had identified him while watching him play for HSC Hannover.

=== Hannover 96 ===
==== 2023–24: Reserve team ====
In the summer of 2023, Chakroun joined Hannover 96 II, the reserve team of Hannover 96 competing in the Regionalliga Nord, the fourth tier of German football. Struckmeier brought him to the club, where he became assistant coach to Daniel Stendel. In his debut season, he played a key role in helping the team secure first place in the league and achieve promotion to the 3. Liga, recording eight goals and 12 assists in 34 appearances. On 19 April 2024, he signed his first professional contract with Hannover 96, valid until 30 June 2026.

==== 2024–25: Transition to the first team ====
During the 2024–25 season, Chakroun was integrated into the first-team squad of Hannover 96, which competed in the 2. Bundesliga. He made his league debut on 22 February 2025, coming on as a 77th-minute substitute in a 1–1 draw against SC Paderborn. That season, he featured in 20 matches for Hannover 96 II in the 3. Liga, scoring four goals and providing three assists, and made one appearance for the first team in the 2. Bundesliga. On 27 June 2025, his contract was extended by one year, until 30 June 2027.

==== 2025–present: First-team breakthrough ====
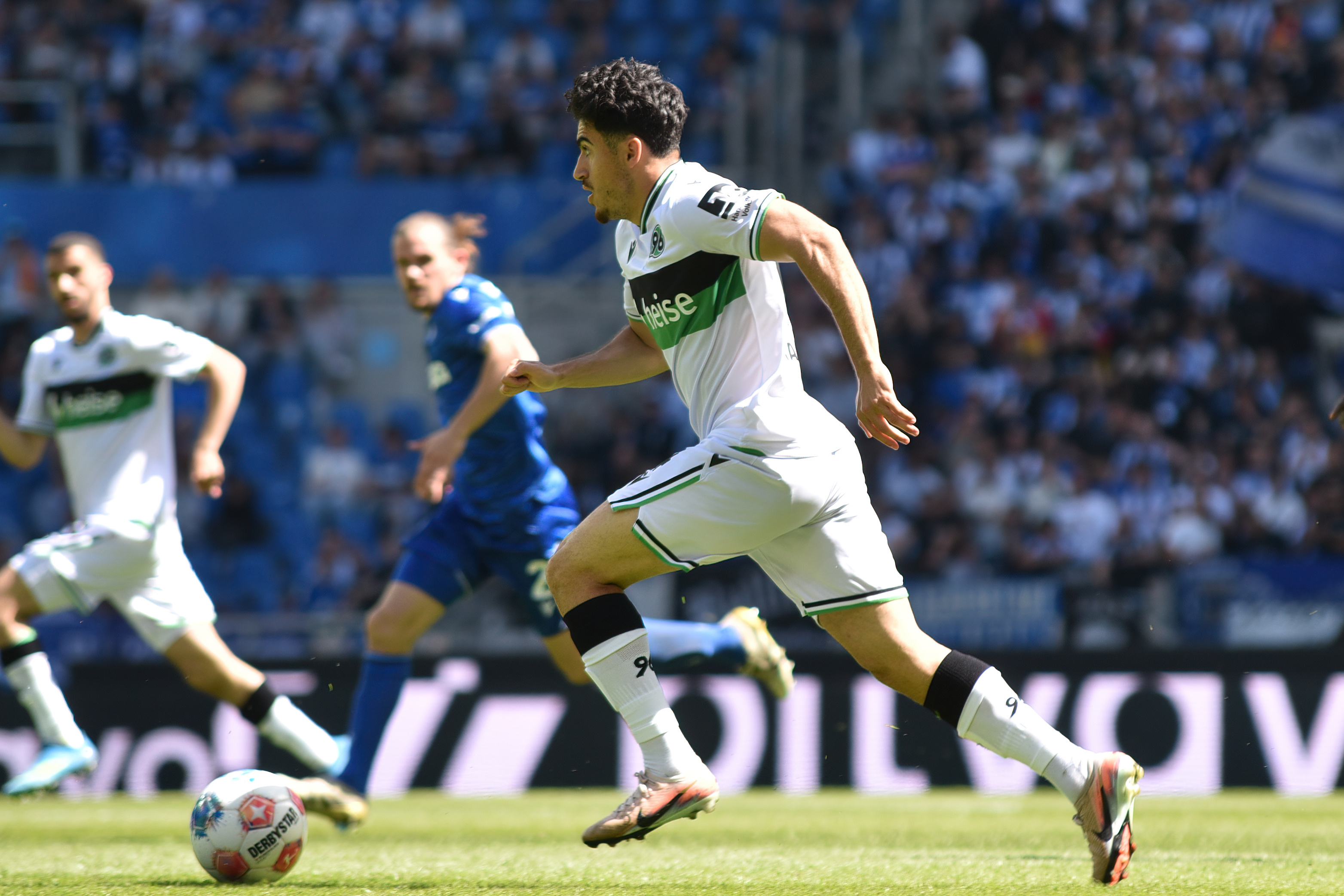
Chakroun with Hannover 96 in 2026

Chakroun broke into the first team during the 2025–26 season, under coach Christian Titz. He scored his first goal and provided his first assist for Hannover 96 on 28 September 2025, helping his team defeat Arminia Bielefeld 3–1 in the 2. Bundesliga. Chakroun's season ended prematurely, after suffering a dislocated shoulder on 3 May 2026 against Preußen Münster. In 21 league appearances, he scored twice and provided two assists.

Chakroun's first appearance after recovering from his injury came on 22 August 2026, as a half-time substitute in a 9–1 win against SV Hemelingen in the 2026–27 DFB-Pokal. He scored his first goal of the 2026–27 season on 17 October, opening his account in his first start of the campaign in a 1–1 league draw against St. Pauli, having earlier seen a goal in the ninth minute ruled out for offside following a VAR review.

== International career ==
Born in Hanover, Germany, to Lebanese parents, Chakroun was eligible to represent both Germany and Lebanon at the international level. His father was born in Lebanon, and Chakroun has said that his parents' home village was happy to see him represent the country.

Chakroun received his first call-up to the Lebanon national team on 5 November 2024 for friendly matches against Thailand and Myanmar. He made his international debut on 14 November 2024, starting in a 0–0 draw against Thailand, and scored his first goal for Lebanon on 25 March 2025, in a 5–0 win over Brunei during the 2027 AFC Asian Cup qualifiers. On 1 October 2026, Chakroun scored a hat-trick in the first half before being substituted at half-time in a 6–0 friendly win against the Maldives.

== Style of play ==
Chakroun primarily operates as a left winger and is noted for his speed and technical ability. Neue Presse described him as a "dribbler" and a "street footballer", highlighting his speed and dribbling. Chakroun stated that "[his] greatest strength is [his] dribbling, especially in one-on-one or one-on-two situations". Although primarily an attacking player, he has also been deployed in central midfield on occasion.

== Career statistics ==
=== Club ===
As of match played 1 November 2026

Appearances and goals by club, season and competition
Club	Season	League			DFB-Pokal		Other		Total	
Club	Season	Division	Apps	Goals	Apps	Goals	Apps	Goals	Apps	Goals
Hannover 96 II	2023–24	Regionalliga Nord	32	8	—		2 (Note: Appearances in Regionalliga promotion play-offs)	0	34	8
Hannover 96 II	2024–25	3. Liga	20	4	—		—		20	4
Hannover 96 II	Total		52	12	0	0	2	0	54	12
Hannover 96	2024–25	2. Bundesliga	1	0	0	0	—		1	0
Hannover 96	2025–26	2. Bundesliga	21	2	1	0	—		23	2
Hannover 96	2026–27	2. Bundesliga	7	2	1	0	—		8	2
Hannover 96	Total		29	4	2	0	0	0	32	4
Career total			81	16	2	0	2	0	86	16

=== International ===
As of match played 17 November 2026

Appearances and goals by national team and year
National team	Year	Apps	Goals
Lebanon	2024	2	0
Lebanon	2025	4	2
Lebanon	2026	4	3
Total		10	5

Scores and results list Lebanon's goal tally first, score column indicates score after each Chakroun goal.

List of international goals scored by Husseyn Chakroun
No.	Date	Venue	Opponent	Score	Result	Competition
1	25 March 2025	Saoud bin Abdulrahman Stadium, Al Wakrah, Qatar	Brunei	4–0	5–0	2027 Asian Cup qualification
2	14 October 2025	Saoud bin Abdulrahman Stadium, Al Wakrah, Qatar	Bhutan	2–0	4–0	2027 Asian Cup qualification
3	1 October 2026	Dolen Omurzakov Stadium, Bishkek, Kyrgyzstan	Maldives	1–0	6–0	Friendly
4	1 October 2026	Dolen Omurzakov Stadium, Bishkek, Kyrgyzstan	Maldives	2–0	6–0	Friendly
5	1 October 2026	Dolen Omurzakov Stadium, Bishkek, Kyrgyzstan	Maldives	3–0	6–0	Friendly

== Honours ==
Hannover 96 II

- Regionalliga Nord: 2023–24

== See also ==
- List of Lebanon international footballers born outside Lebanon
