= Burak Karan =

German footballer (1987–2013)

Personal information
- Date of birth: 11 September 1987 (age 39)
- Place of birth: Germany
- Date of death: 11 October 2013 (aged 26)
- Place of death: Syria
- Positions: Defender; midfielder

Senior career*
Years	Team	Apps	(Gls)
2006–2007	Hannover 96 II	15	(0)
2008	Alemannia Aachen II	2	(0)

International career
2002	Germany U16	5	(0)
2003	Germany U17	2	(0)
- * Club domestic league appearances and goals

Burak Karan (11 September 1987 - 11 October 2013) was a German footballer and jihadist who played as a defender or midfielder for Alemannia Aachen II.

== Early life ==
Karan grew up in Wuppertal, Germany.

== Career ==
Karan was considered a Germany prospect.

== Style of play ==
Karan mainly operated as a defender or a midfielder and was known for his passing ability.

== Post-playing career and death ==
Karan retired from professional football at the age of twenty and joined a jihad group in Syria, where he went by the name Abu Abdullah al-Turki and died from a bomb attack in October 2013.

== Personal life ==
Karan was married and had two sons.
