= Mark Gevorgyan =

Armenian footballer (born 2005)

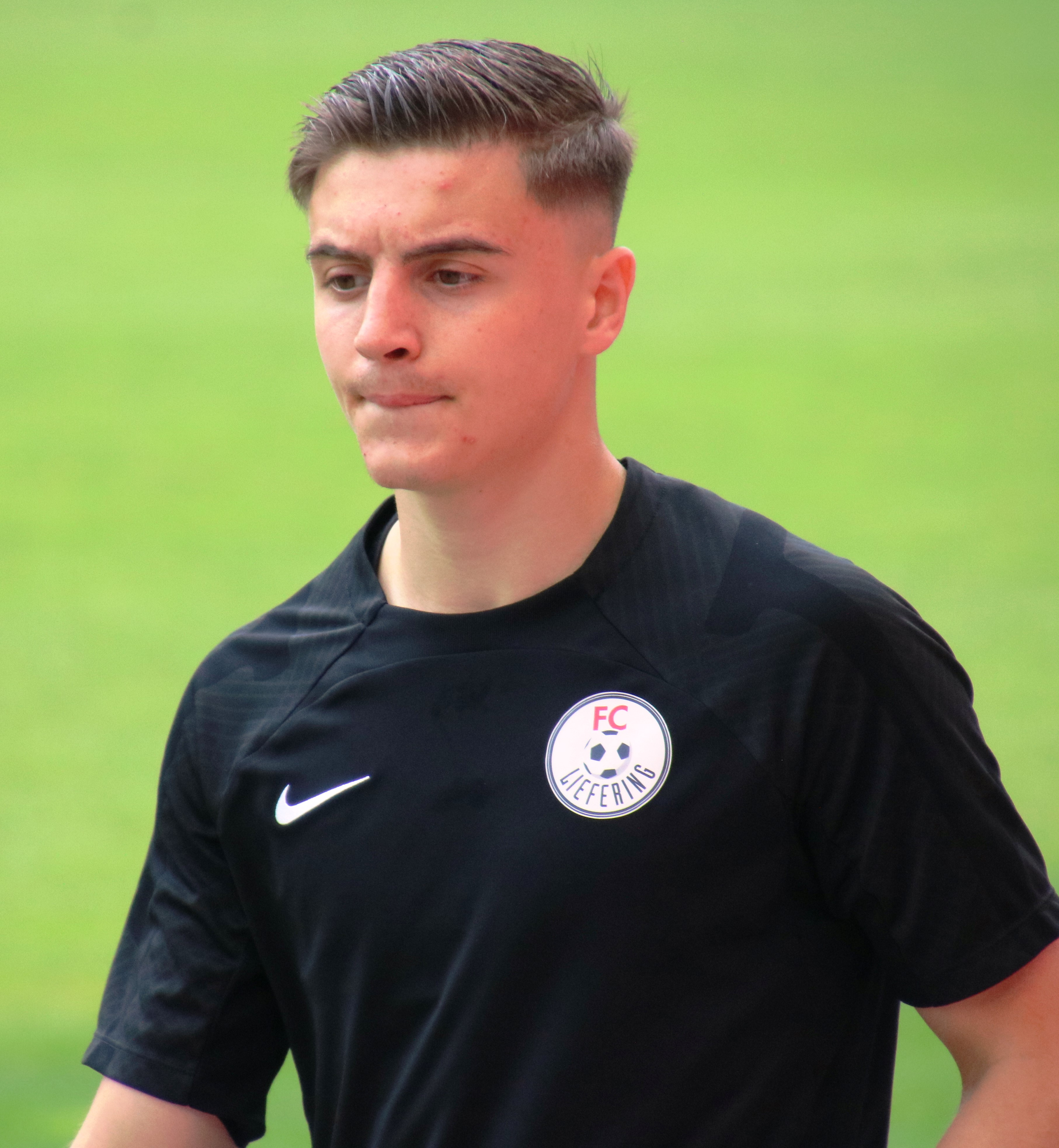
- Gevorgyan in 2023

Personal information
- Date of birth: 1 June 2005 (age 21)
- Place of birth: Rosenheim, Germany
- Height: 1.75 m (5 ft 9 in)
- Position: Defender

Team information
- Current team: 1860 Munich
- Number: 24

Youth career
- –2017: 1860 Rosenheim
- 2017–2022: Red Bull Salzburg

Senior career*
Years	Team	Apps	(Gls)
2022–2024	Red Bull Salzburg	0	(0)
2022–2024	FC Liefering	35	(1)
2024–2026	Hannover 96 II	30	(0)
2026–	1860 Munich	6	(0)

International career^{‡}
2021–2022	Germany U17	5	(0)
2025–	Armenia U21	1	(0)
- * Club domestic league appearances and goals as of 5 October 2026 ‡ National team caps and goals as of 3 June 2025

Mark Gevorgyan (Armenian: Մարկ Գևորգյան; born 1 June 2005) is a professional footballer who plays as a defender for Regionalliga Bayern club 1860 Munich. Born in Germany, he represents Armenia at youth level.

== Club career ==
=== Early career ===
Gevorgyan began his career at 1860 Rosenheim. For the 2017–18 season, he moved to Austria to join the youth team at Red Bull Salzburg. At Salzburg, he also progressed through all the academy categories starting in the 2019–20 season. For the 2022–23 season, he joined the farm team at FC Liefering in the 2. Liga.

=== FC Liefering ===
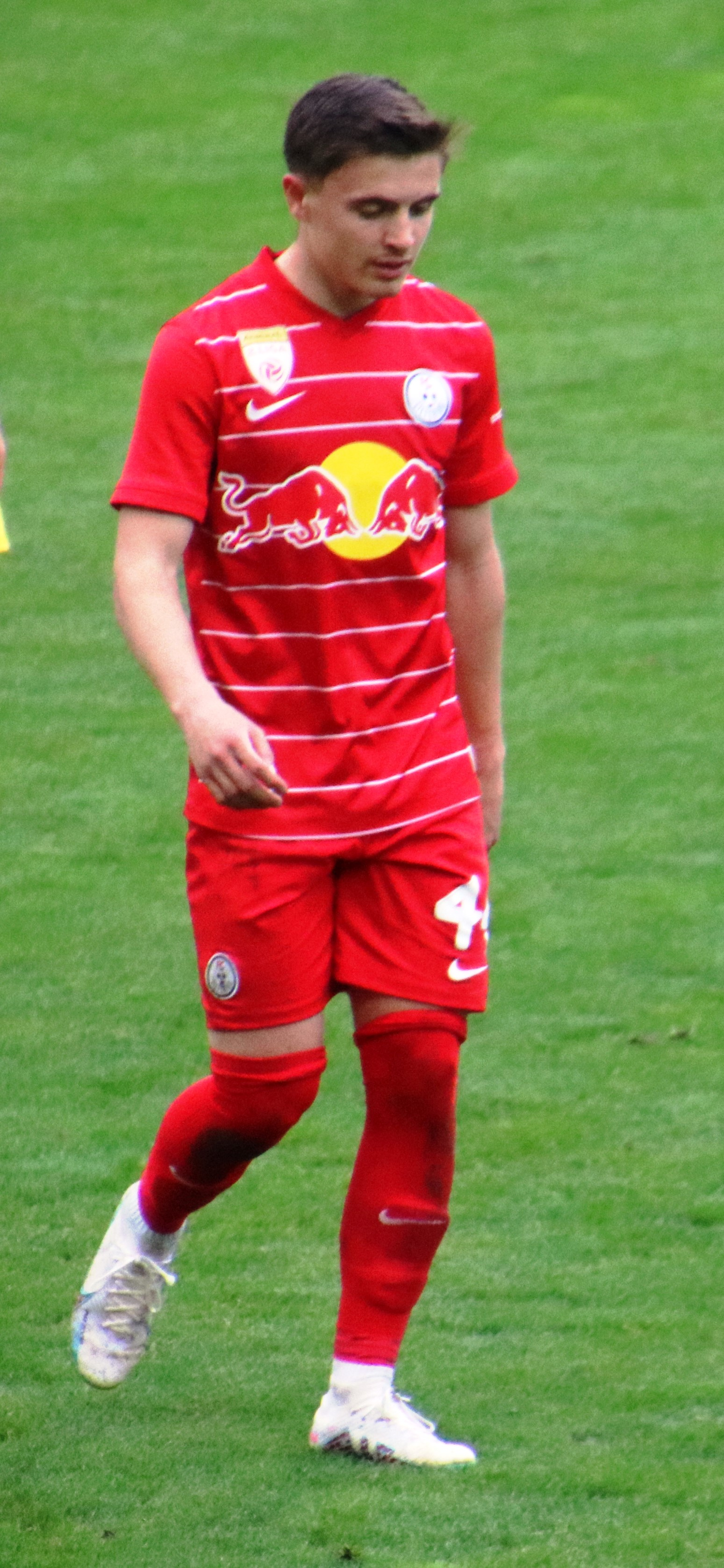
Gevorgyan playing for FC Liefering in 2023

He made his debut in the 2. Liga in September 2022, when he started against SV Horn on the seventh matchday of that season. In total, he played 35 second division games for Liefering in two years. He left Salzburg after the 2023–24 season.

=== Hannover 96 II ===
After seven years, he returned to Germany for the 2024–25 season and signed for Hannover 96 II of the 3. Liga.

=== 1860 Munich ===
On 29 July 2026, 1860 Munich announced the signing of Gevorgyan from Hannover 96 II, on a contract until the summer of 2028.

== International career ==
Gevorgyan made his debut for the Germany U17 team in November 2021, going on to play five matches before February 2022. He then switched federations, making his debut with the Armenia U21 team on 2 June 2025 in a 1–1 draw against Cyprus.

== Personal life ==
His twin brother Mike is also a footballer.
