= Abdoulaye Gueye =

Italian footballer (born 2003)

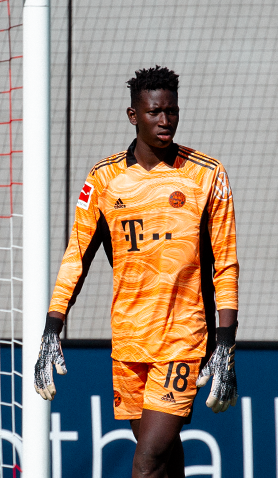

Personal information
- Date of birth: 11 August 2003 (age 23)
- Place of birth: Brescia, Italy
- Height: 1.99 m (6 ft 6 in)
- Position: Goalkeeper

Team information
- Current team: Hannover 96 II
- Number: 12

Youth career
- Leonessa Calcio
- Mario Rigamonti Calcio
- SC München
- 2017–2019: Stern München
- 2019–2020: SV Aubing
- 2020–2022: SV Planegg-Krailling

Senior career*
Years	Team	Apps	(Gls)
2022–2024	TSV Landsberg	8	(0)
2024–2025	Wacker Innsbruck	6	(0)
2025–	Hannover 96 II	1	(0)
- * Club domestic league appearances and goals as of 20 June 2026

Abdoulaye Gueye (born 11 August 2003) is an Italian professional footballer who plays as a goalkeeper for Hannover 96 II.

== Early life ==
Gueye was born in Brescia, Italy, to Senegalese parents.

== Club career ==
Gueye began his footballing career as an outfield player with Leonessa Calcio in his native Italy, before playing in goal at under-12 level for Mario Rigamonti Calcio. He later moved to Munich, Germany, where he failed to find a club for a year before settling at SC München, where he again played outfield. He played as a striker for Stern München for two years, before spending a season at SV Aubing.

In 2020, he trialled with SV Planegg-Krailling as a goalkeeper, and after signing, became the team's first choice goalkeeper at under-19 level. The following year, he was selected to be part of the FC Bayern Munich World Squad initiative - a squad to represent the Bavarian club in international friendlies, stating that he found the opportunity to be "unbelievable".

On his return to club football, Planegg-Krailling wanted to integrate Gueye into the club's first team, but he was advised to join semi-professional side TSV Landsberg, which he did in 2022. He made his debut for the club in a 6–5 penalty shoot out Bavarian Cup win against TSV Schwaben Augsburg on 26 July 2022.

Following the early retirement of TSV Landsberg goalkeeper David Hundertmark, Gueye was promoted to first-choice goalkeeper, to fight for the position alongside new signing Fabio Rašić. He was given a run in the first team, playing five games in March and April 2023.

In February 2024 he signed with Austrian Regionalliga side Wacker Innsbruck. He made his debut for the club in a 6–0 win against SC Mils, coming on as a substitute for Lukas Tauber.

On 16 June 2025, Gueye signed for German Regionalliga club Hannover 96 II.

== Career statistics ==
=== Club ===
As of 19 April 2023

Appearances and goals by club, season and competition
Club	Season	League			Cup		Other		Total	
Club	Season	Division	Apps	Goals	Apps	Goals	Apps	Goals	Apps	Goals
TSV Landsberg	2022–23	Bayernliga	6	0	0	0	1 (Note: Appearances in the Bavarian Cup)	0	7	0
TSV Landsberg	2023–24	Bayernliga	2	0	0	0	0	0	2	0
TSV Landsberg	Total		8	0	0	0	1	0	9	0
Wacker Innsbruck	2024–25	Regionalliga	6	0	0	0	0	0	1	0
Career total			9	0	0	0	1	0	10	0
