= Robin Kalem =

German footballer

Personal information
- Full name: Robin Tristan Kalem
- Date of birth: 14 July 2002 (age 24)
- Place of birth: Stühlingen, Germany
- Height: 1.81 m (5 ft 11 in)
- Position: Midfielder

Team information
- Current team: Wehen Wiesbaden
- Number: 10

Youth career
- –2007: SV Lottstetten
- 2008–2020: Grasshopper Club Zürich

Senior career*
Years	Team	Apps	(Gls)
2020–2024	Grasshopper Club Zürich	21	(0)
2021–2024	Grasshopper II	25	(9)
2021–2023	→ Schaffhausen (loan)	58	(3)
2024–2025	Hannover 96 II	35	(7)
2025–	Wehen Wiesbaden	13	(0)
- * Club domestic league appearances and goals as of 24 May 2026

Robin Tristan Kalem (born 14 July 2002) is a German professional footballer who plays as a midfielder for 3. Liga club Wehen Wiesbaden.

== Professional career ==
=== Grasshopper Club Zürich ===
Kalem joined the Grasshopper academy in 2008 at only six years of age. He made his professional debut for the first team mere days after his 18th birthday, on 17 July 2020, in 0–1 defeat against Lausanne-Sport in the Swiss Challenge League. He scored his first goal in the Swiss Cup against Stade Lausanne-Ouchy on 12 September 2020 and continued making appearances for the first squad until he broke his toe in April 2021, thus missing the remainder of the season.

==== Loan to Schaffhausen ====
For the 2021–22 season, he was loaned out to FC Schaffhausen in the Swiss Challenge League, to earn some experience, along with fellow GC youth Fabio Fehr. He collected a total of 30 caps for Schaffhausen and scored one goal, along with supplying four assists.

He returned to Grasshopper for the preparation of the 2022–23 season. On 14 July 2022, a few days before the start of the season, he returned to Schaffhausen for another half season loan spell, along with teammate Leonardo Uka. On 20 January 2023, he extended his contract with GC for a further year with an option to extend. After completing the winter break with his parent club, he returned to Schaffhausen for the remainder of the season together with teammate Simone Stroscio.

==== Return to Grasshopper ====
Following the conclusion of the season, he returned to Grasshopper to begin preparation for the next season. However, he made just one appearance for the first team, in the first round of the Swiss Cup, and played mainly in the reserves. On 19 June 2024, Grasshoppers announced that Kalem had departed the club.

=== Hannover 96 ===
On 25 June 2024, he joined the reserves of Hannover 96, who play in the 2. Bundesliga in Germany. The reserves play in the 3. Liga.

=== Wehen Wiesbaden ===
On 9 May 2025, Kalem signed a three-season contract with Wehen Wiesbaden in 3. Liga.

== Personal life ==
Born in Stühlingen, on the German-Swiss border, Kalem's talent was noticed at a children's tournament at five years of age.

He earned his Federal Diploma of Commerce on 15 July 2022.
