= Lukas Wallner =

Austrian footballer (born 2003)

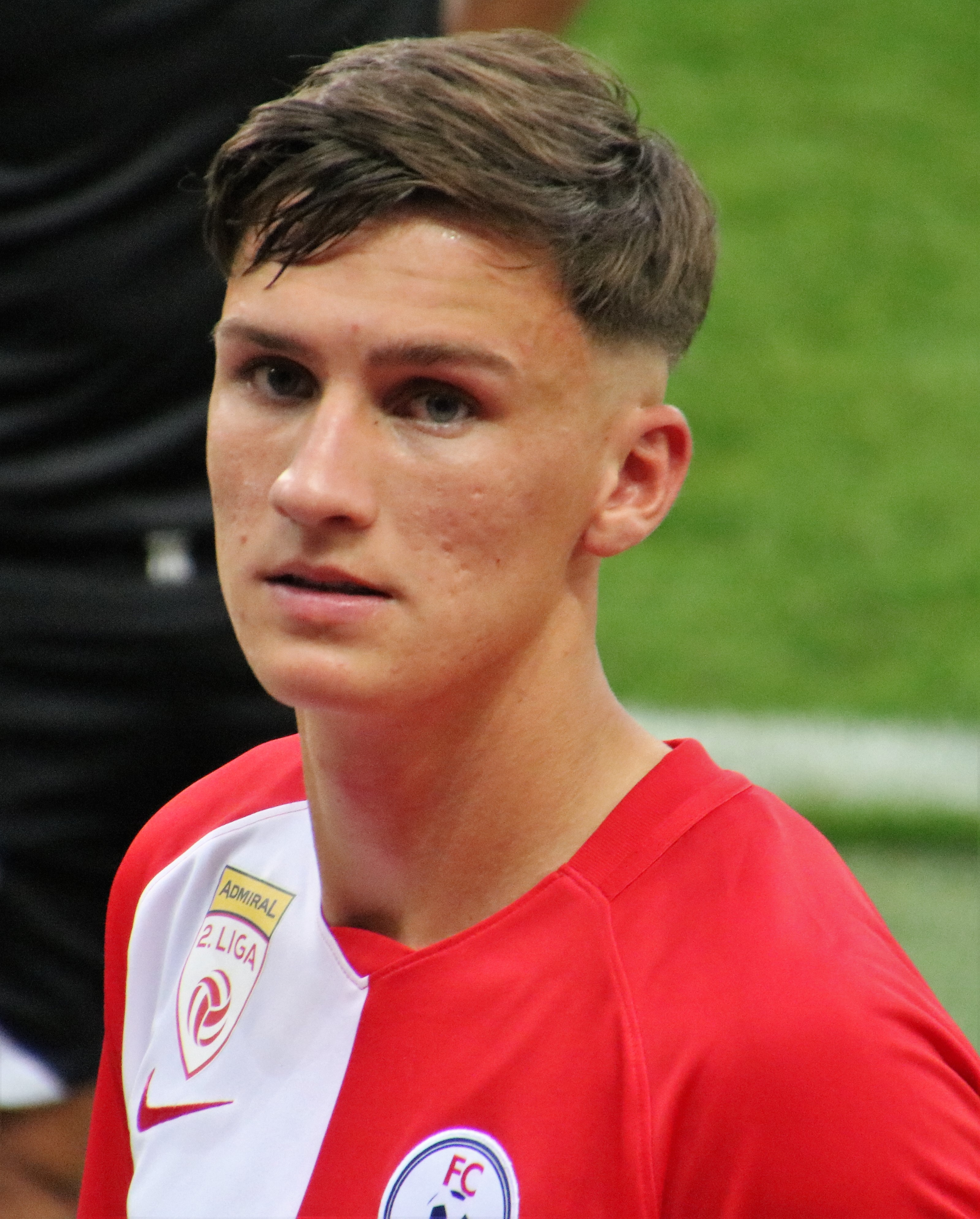
- Wallner with Liefering in 2021

Personal information
- Date of birth: 26 April 2003 (age 23)
- Place of birth: St Johann im Pongau, Austria
- Height: 1.92 m (6 ft 4 in)
- Position: Centre-back

Team information
- Current team: Hansa Rostock
- Number: 16

Youth career
- 2009–2013: TSV St. Johann
- 2013–2015: FC Liefering
- 2015–2020: Red Bull Salzburg
- 2020–2021: FC Liefering

Senior career*
Years	Team	Apps	(Gls)
2021–2024	FC Liefering	63	(2)
2023–2024	Red Bull Salzburg	0	(0)
2024–2025	Hannover 96 II	25	(3)
2025–	Hansa Rostock	15	(1)

International career^{‡}
2017–2018	Austria U15	4	(0)
2018–2019	Austria U16	10	(1)
2019	Austria U17	5	(1)
2021	Austria U18	1	(0)
2021–2022	Austria U19	11	(1)
2022–2023	Austria U21	3	(0)
- * Club domestic league appearances and goals as of 28 May 2026 ‡ National team caps and goals as of 23:32, 16 June 2023 (UTC)

Lukas Wallner (born 26 April 2003) is an Austrian professional footballer who plays as a centre-back for German 3. Liga club Hansa Rostock.

== Club career ==
Wallner started his football career with hometown club TSV St. Johann. In 2013, he moved to the academy of FC Liefering the reserve team of Red Bull Salzburg. He was promoted to the academy of the main team in 2015.

Ahead of the 2020–21 season, Wallner was included in the FC Liefering first-team squad competing in the second-tier 2. Liga. He made his professional on 7 March 2021, when he came on as a substitute for Bryan Okoh in the 84th minute of a 6–2 victory against SV Horn. He scored his first goal for the club 2 April, opening the score in a 2–1 win over Grazer AK.

On 20 December 2021, Wallner signed a contract until 2025 with Red Bull Salzburg, as he continued gaining experience at the second level with Liefering.

On 14 August 2024, Wallner joined German 3. Liga club Hannover 96 II on a one-year deal with an option to extend.

On 12 June 2025, Wallner moved to Hansa Rostock, also in 3. Liga.

== International career ==
Wallner would gain his first cap for an Austrian national youth team in October 2017, appearing for the under-15s. In September 2019, he made his debut for Austria U17 against England.

In September 2021, he made his debut in the under-19 team against Turkey. With the under-19s, he took part in the 2022 UEFA European Under-19 Championship. During the tournament he appeared in all four games, which saw Austria eliminated in the group stage.

== Career statistics ==
As of match played 25 May 2024

Appearances and goals by club, season and competition
Club	Season	League			National cup		Continental		Other		Total	
Club	Season	Division	Apps	Goals	Apps	Goals	Apps	Goals	Apps	Goals	Apps	Goals
FC Liefering	2020–21	2. Liga	10	1	—		—		—		10	1
FC Liefering	2021–22	2. Liga	20	0	—		—		—		20	0
FC Liefering	2022–23	2. Liga	23	0	—		—		—		23	0
FC Liefering	2023–24	2. Liga	10	1	—		—		—		10	1
FC Liefering	Total		63	2	—		—		—		63	2
Red Bull Salzburg	2022–23	Austrian Bundesliga	0	0	0	0	0	0	0	0	0	0
Red Bull Salzburg	2023–24	Austrian Bundesliga	0	0	1	0	0	0	0	0	1	0
Red Bull Salzburg	Total		0	0	1	0	0	0	0	0	1	0
Career total			63	2	1	0	0	0	0	0	64	2
