= Mustafa Abdullatif =

Syrian footballer (born 2003)

Personal information
- Date of birth: 15 December 2003 (age 22)
- Place of birth: Berlin, Germany
- Height: 1.78 m (5 ft 10 in)
- Position: Midfielder

Team information
- Current team: Emmen
- Number: 10

Youth career
- –2015: Tennis Borussia Berlin
- 2015–2022: Hertha BSC

Senior career*
Years	Team	Apps	(Gls)
2022–2024	Hertha BSC II	55	(15)
2024–2026	Hannover 96 II	42	(3)
2026–	Emmen	0	(0)

International career^{‡}
2023–	Syria U23	5	(3)
2024–	Syria	5	(0)
- * Club domestic league appearances and goals as of 20 June 2026 ‡ National team caps and goals as of 27 September 2026

Mustafa Abdullatif (born 15 December 2003) is a professional footballer who plays as a midfielder for Eerste Divisie club Emmen. Born in Germany, he plays for the Syria national team.

== Club career ==
Abdullatif joined the youth ranks of Hertha BSC from Tennis Borussia Berlin in 2015. In 2022, he was promoted to the club's reserve side. Over the next two seasons, he made fifty-five appearances for the club, scoring fifteen goals. In June 2024, it was announced that he had joined Hannover 96 II of the 3. Liga. He debuted for the club in the opening match of the 2024–25 season, coming on as a substitute against Erzgebirge Aue.

On 21 June 2026, Abullatif moved to the Netherlands and signed a two-year contract with Emmen in the second tier.

== International career ==
Abdullatif made his senior international debut for Syria on 3 September 2024 in a 2024 Intercontinental Cup match against Mauritius. In the match, his shot deflected off of a Mauritius defender and into the net. He started the match and played seventy-four minutes of the 2–0 victory. Syria went on to win the tournament. Previously Abdullatif had made five appearances for the Syria national under-23 team, scoring three goals. All three goals of his goals came in a 2024 AFC U-23 Asian Cup qualification win over Brunei.

== Career statistics ==
=== International ===
As of match played 25 March 2025

Syria
Year	Apps	Goals
2024	2	0
2025	1	0
Total	3	0
