= Felix Göttlicher =

German footballer (born 2002)

Personal information
- Date of birth: 20 March 2002 (age 24)
- Place of birth: Ingolstadt, Germany
- Height: 1.93 m (6 ft 4 in)
- Position: Centre-back

Team information
- Current team: F91 Dudelange

Youth career
- –2016: FC Ingolstadt 04
- 2016: Bayern Munich
- 2017: FC Augsburg
- 2018: JFG Neuburg
- 2018–2020: SpVgg Unterhaching

Senior career*
Years	Team	Apps	(Gls)
2020–2022	SpVgg Unterhaching	35	(0)
2020	→ VfB Eichstätt (loan)	0	(0)
2022–2023	Erzgebirge Aue	0	(0)
2022–2023	→ Würzburger Kickers (loan)	28	(3)
2023–2024	SV Sandhausen	12	(1)
2024–2025	Hannover 96 II	7	(0)
2025–2026	Kickers Emden	28	(4)
2026–	F91 Dudelange		
- * Club domestic league appearances and goals as of 20 June 2026

Felix Göttlicher (born 20 March 2002) is a German professional footballer who plays as a centre-back for Regionalliga Nord club Kickers Emden. He is the older brother of Moritz Göttlicher.

== Career ==
=== SpVgg Unterhaching ===
After playing youth football for FC Ingolstadt 04, Bayern Munich, FC Augsburg and JFG Neuburg, he joined SpVgg Unterhaching's academy in 2018. He joined VfB Eichstätt on loan in January 2020, but failed to make an appearance.

He made his senior debut for SpVgg Unterhaching on 28 November 2020 in a 2–1 victory over SV Wehen Wiesbaden.

On 14 January 2020, he was sent on a six-month loan to VfB Eichstätt.

=== Erzgebirge Aue ===
Göttlicher joined 3. Liga club Erzgebirge Aue on 12 April 2022, ahead of the 2022–23 season. He was sent on a one-season loan to recently relegated Regionalliga Bayern club Würzburger Kickers on 24 August 2022, before making any appearances for Aue.

=== SV Sandhausen ===
On 28 July 2023, Göttlicher signed with SV Sandhausen in 3. Liga.

=== Hannover 96 II ===
On 6 June 2024, Göttlicher joined 3. Liga club Hannover 96 II.

=== Kickers Emden ===
On 8 August 2025, Göttlicher joined Regionalliga Nord club Kickers Emden.

=== F91 Dudelange ===
In August 2026, Göttlicher joined Luxembourg National Division club F91 Dudelange.
