= Moritz Göttlicher =

German footballer (born 2008)

Personal information
- Date of birth: 21 April 2008 (age 18)
- Place of birth: Ingolstadt, Germany
- Height: 1.84 m (6 ft 0 in)
- Position: Midfielder

Team information
- Current team: VfL Bochum II
- Number: 7

Youth career
- –2016: FC Gerolfing
- 2016–2026: Bayern Munich
- 2026–: VfL Bochum

Senior career*
Years	Team	Apps	(Gls)
2026–	VfL Bochum II	5	(0)

International career^{‡}
2024	Germany U16	5	(1)
2024–2025	Germany U17	15	(1)
- * Club domestic league appearances and goals as of 12 September 2026 ‡ National team caps and goals as of 25 May 2025

Moritz Göttlicher (born 21 April 2008) is a German professional footballer who plays as a midfielder for Regionalliga West club VfL Bochum II. He is a German youth international.

== Club career ==
=== Bayern Munich ===
Göttlicher is a youth product of FC Gerolfing, in 2016 he joined the youth academy of Bundesliga side Bayern Munich with whom he progressed and continued his development.

He was one of the players that were called up by Bayern Munich head coach Vincent Kompany for the last 2025 pre-season friendly match against Red Eagles Austria on 23 August 2025, Göttlicher came off the bench and substituted Aleksandar Pavlović at the 15th minute during a 3–1 win.

In December 2025, fellow Bundesliga clubs such as FC Augsburg and Mainz 05, showed interest in recruiting him, once his contract is fulfilled in July 2026, and he becomes a free agent.

=== VfL Bochum ===
On 1 February 2026, before his contract with Bayern Munich expired, Göttlicher was transferred and signed a long-term contract with 2. Bundesliga club VfL Bochum.

== International career ==
Göttlicher has represented Germany at under-16 and under-17 levels since 2024. He was part of the U17 squad for the 2025 UEFA European Under-17 Championship

== Personal life ==
He is the younger brother of Felix Göttlicher, who also played for Bayern Munich's youth academy.
