= Stefano Marino =

German footballer

Personal information
- Full name: Stefano Marino
- Date of birth: March 12, 2004 (age 22)
- Place of birth: Pforzheim, Germany
- Height: 1.86 m (6 ft 1 in)
- Position: Forward

Team information
- Current team: SC Paderborn
- Number: 30

Youth career
- SGV Heilbronn-Freiberg
- 2020–2021: Karlsruher SC

Senior career*
Years	Team	Apps	(Gls)
2021–2024	Karlsruher SC	4	(0)
2023–2024	→ FC-Astoria Walldorf (loan)	25	(8)
2024–2025	Hannover 96 II	28	(2)
2025–2026	SC Paderborn II	6	(8)
2025–	SC Paderborn	35	(8)

International career^{‡}
2022	Germany U18	3	(1)
2022–2023	Germany U19	4	(2)
2023	Germany U20	3	(0)
- * Club domestic league appearances and goals as of 17:30, 31 October 2026 (UTC) ‡ National team caps and goals as of 21:54, 24 July 2026 (UTC)

Stefano Marino (born 12 March 2004) is a German professional footballer who plays as a forward for Bundesliga club SC Paderborn.

== Club career ==
On 31 May 2022, Marino signed his first professional contract with Karlsruher SC and was promoted to their senior team in the 2. Bundesliga. On 1 September 2023, he joined FC-Astoria Walldorf on a season-long loan in the Regionalliga. On 1 September 2024, he joined Hannover 96 II on a 2-year contract.

In 2025, he transferred to 2. Bundesliga side SC Paderborn. On 5 May 2026, he extended his contract with Paderborn as they achieved promotion to the Bundesliga.

== International career ==
Born in Germany, Marino is of Italian descent and holds dual German and Italian citizenship. He was called up to the Germany U20s in September 2023.

== Career statistics ==
As of match played 31 October 2026

Appearances and goals by club, season and competition
Club	Season	League			DFB-Pokal		Europe		Other		Total	
Club	Season	Division	Apps	Goals	Apps	Goals	Apps	Goals	Apps	Goals	Apps	Goals
Karlsruher SC	2021–22	2. Bundesliga	2	0	1	0	—		—		3	0
Karlsruher SC	2023–24	2. Bundesliga	2	0	0	0	—		—		2	0
Karlsruher SC	Total		4	0	1	0	—		—		5	0
FC-Astoria Walldorf (loan)	2023–24	Regionalliga Südwest	25	8	—		—		2 (Note: Appearances in Baden Cup)	1	27	9
Hannover 96 II	2024–25	3. Liga	28	2	—		—		—		28	2
SC Paderborn II	2025–26	Regionalliga West	6	8	—		—		—		6	8
SC Paderborn	2025–26	2. Bundesliga	27	6	2	1	—		2 (Note: Appearances in Bundesliga promotion play-offs)	0	31	7
SC Paderborn	2026–27	Bundesliga	8	2	2	1	—		—		10	3
SC Paderborn	Total		35	8	4	2	—		2	0	41	10
Career total			98	26	5	2	0	0	4	1	107	29
