= Jacob Engel (footballer) =

German footballer

Personal information
- Date of birth: 13 January 2001 (age 25)
- Place of birth: Bad Kreuznach, Germany
- Height: 1.75 m (5 ft 9 in)
- Position: Left-back

Team information
- Current team: TSV Aubstadt
- Number: 13

Youth career
- TSV Schott Mainz
- –2016: Mainz 05
- 2016–2020: Eintracht Frankfurt
- 2020–: SC Freiburg

Senior career*
Years	Team	Apps	(Gls)
2020–2022	SC Freiburg II	10	(0)
2022–2023	1. FC Schweinfurt 05	36	(0)
2023–2024	VSG Altglienicke	26	(0)
2024–2025	Greifswalder FC	28	(0)
2025–2026	SGV Freiberg	24	(0)
2026–	TSV Aubstadt	5	(1)
- * Club domestic league appearances and goals as of 24 September 2026

Jacob Engel (born 13 January 2001) is a German footballer who plays as a left-back for TSV Aubstadt.

== Career statistics ==
As of 1 July 2022

Appearances and goals by club, season and competition
Club	Season	League			Cup		Continental		Other		Total	
Club	Season	Division	Apps	Goals	Apps	Goals	Apps	Goals	Apps	Goals	Apps	Goals
SC Freiburg II	2020–21	Regionalliga	8	0	–		–		0	0	8	0
SC Freiburg II	2021–22	3. Liga	2	0	–		–		0	0	2	0
Career total			10	0	0	0	0	0	0	0	10	0
