= Moritz Seiffert =

German footballer

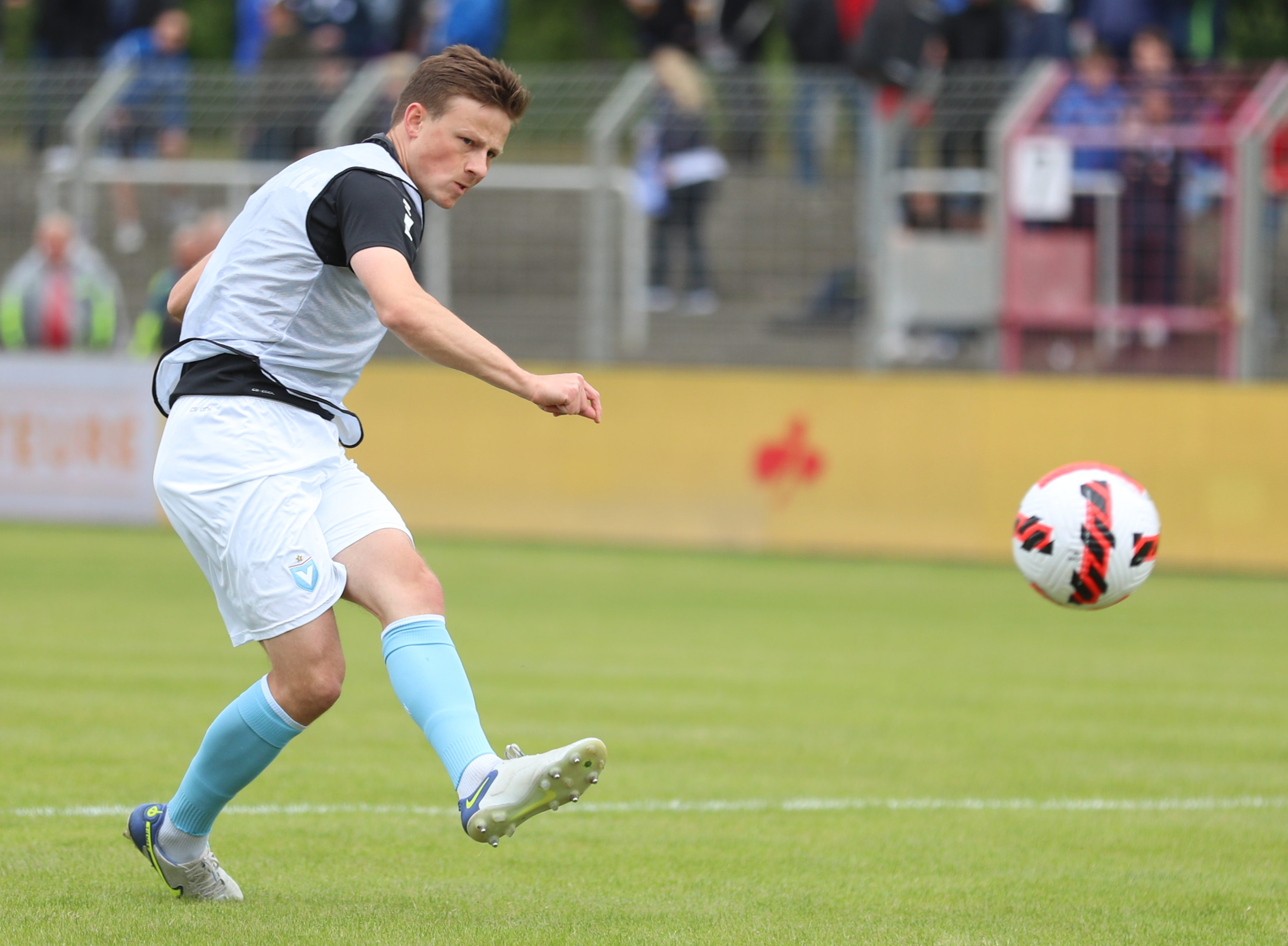

Personal information
- Date of birth: 4 November 2000 (age 26)
- Place of birth: Bremen, Germany
- Height: 1.77 m (5 ft 10 in)
- Positions: Left-back; left winger

Team information
- Current team: 1860 Munich
- Number: 21

Youth career
- –2017: SV Ahlerstedt/Ottendorf
- 2017–2019: FC St. Pauli

Senior career*
Years	Team	Apps	(Gls)
2019–2020	SSV Jeddeloh	14	(3)
2020–2023	Viktoria Berlin	68	(4)
2023–2025	FC Ingolstadt 04	39	(1)
2025–2026	Erzgebirge Aue	19	(1)
2026–	1860 Munich	3	(0)
- * Club domestic league appearances and goals as of 24 September 2026

Moritz Seiffert (German pronunciation: [ˈmoːʁɪts ˈzaɪ̯fɛʁt]; born 4 November 2000) is a German professional footballer who plays as a left-back or left winger for 1860 Munich.

== Club career ==
On 12 June 2023, Seiffert signed with FC Ingolstadt 04 in 3. Liga.

On 2 June 2025, Seiffert moved to Erzgebirge Aue.
