= Jannis Turtschan =

German footballer

Personal information
- Date of birth: 21 October 2001 (age 25)
- Place of birth: Garching an der Alz, Germany
- Height: 1.66 m (5 ft 5 in)
- Position: Midfielder

Team information
- Current team: SV Wacker Burghausen
- Number: 23

Youth career
- –2011: TuS Alztal Garching/Alz
- 2011–2017: Red Bull Salzburg
- 2017–2020: SpVgg Unterhaching

Senior career*
Years	Team	Apps	(Gls)
2020–2022	SpVgg Unterhaching	44	(0)
2022–2025	FC St. Pauli II	48	(1)
2025–	SV Wacker Burghausen	39	(2)
- * Club domestic league appearances and goals as of 27 September 2026

Jannis Turtschan (born 21 October 2001) is a German professional footballer who plays as a midfielder for SV Wacker Burghausen.

== Career statistics ==
As of 25 September 2020

Appearances and goals by club, season and competition
Club	Season	League			National cup		Other		Total	
Club	Season	Division	Apps	Goals	Apps	Goals	Apps	Goals	Apps	Goals
SpVgg Unterhaching	2019–20	3. Liga	2	0	0	0	0	0	2	0
Career total			2	0	0	0	0	0	2	0
