= TSV Aubstadt =

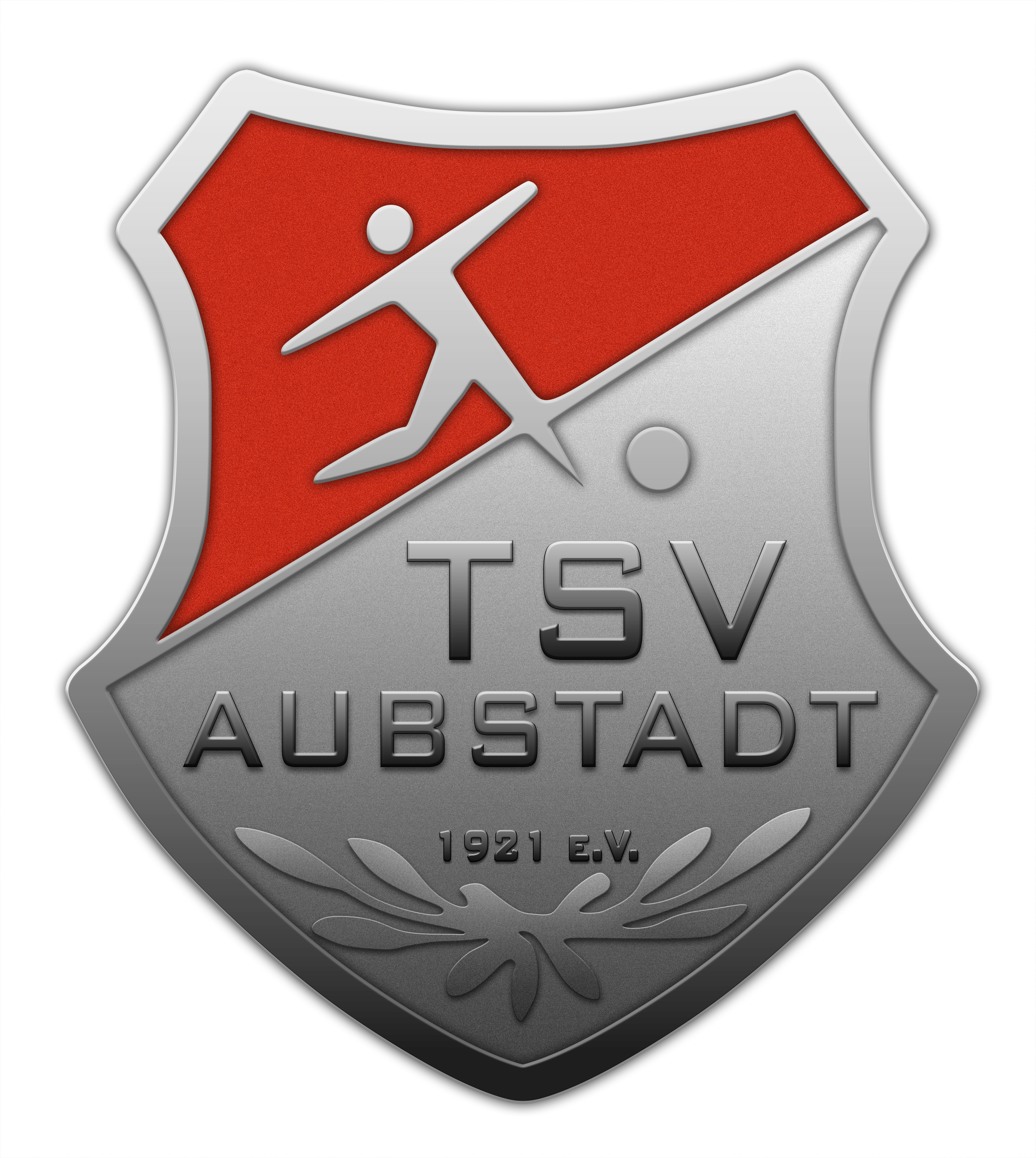
- Full name: Turn- und Sportverein Aubstadt 1921 e. V.
- Nickname: Abschter
- Founded: 1921
- Ground: NGN-Arena
- Capacity: 3,000
- Chairman: Herbert Köhler
- Manager: Claudiu Bozesan
- League: Regionalliga Bayern (IV)
- 2025–26: Regionalliga Bayern, 6th of 18
Home colours	Away colours

TSV Aubstadt is a German association football club from the town of Aubstadt, Bavaria.

The club qualified for the new northern division of the expanded Bayernliga in 2012, the fifth tier of the German football league system. In 2019, the team promoted to tier-four Regionalliga Bayern after winning the Bayernliga Nord championship.

== History ==
For most of its history the club has been a non-descript amateur side in local Bavarian football. In post-Second World War football Aubstadt played in the local C-Klasse, the lowest division of the Bavarian football league system. It won promotion to the B-Klasse in 1961 and on to the A-Klasse four years later in 1965. In the 1980s and early 1990s the club won promotion to the Bezirksliga from the A-Klasse twice but was relegated again each time. In 1993 it permanently left local football when it won promotion to the Bezirksliga again which was followed by a title in this league in 1994.

The later won promotion to the tier five Bezirksoberliga Unterfranken, then the highest football league in Lower Franconia, in 1994. It spent two seasons at this level, coming 13th in its first year there but winning the league the year after and earning promotion to the Landesliga Bayern-Nord. Three seasons in the Landesliga followed in which the club never finished better than 13th and was relegated again in 1999.

A runners-up finish back in the Bezirksoberliga in 1999–2000 took TSV straight back up to the Landesliga but again the club could never break into the upper half of the table and was relegated again after four seasons.

The club now spent the next four seasons in the Bezirksoberliga Unterfranken where it finished as low as twelfth in 2006 but won the league for a second time in 2008. TSV Aubstadt's third stint in the Landesliga threatened to become as unsuccessful as the first two with a 9th, 15th and 13th-place finish in the following seasons. The league's final season, 2011–12 however was also the clubs best, finishing runners-up and qualifying for the new northern division of the Bayernliga.

In the Bayernliga the club came eighth in its first season there but finished runners-up in 2013–14. Having received approval for a Regionalliga Bayern licence the team took part in the promotion round but failed in the first of two rounds, losing 7–3 on aggregate to 1. FC Schweinfurt 05.

== Honours ==
=== League ===
- Bayernliga Nord (V)
  - Champions: 2019
  - Runners-up: (2) 2014, 2018
- Landesliga Bayern-Nord (VI)
  - Runners-up: 2012
- Bezirksoberliga Unterfranken (VI-VII)
  - Champions: 1996, 2008
  - Runners-up: 2000
- Bezirksliga Unterfranken-Ost (VI)
  - Champions: 1994
- A-Klasse (VI-VII)
  - Champions: 1981, 1986, 1993
- B-Klasse (VII)
  - Champions: 1965
- C-Klasse (VII)
  - Champions: 1958, 1961

=== Cup ===
- Bavarian Cup
  - Runners-up: 2021–22

== Players ==
As of 8 September 2026

Note: Flags indicate national team as defined under FIFA eligibility rules; some limited exceptions apply. Players may hold more than one non-FIFA nationality.

No.	Pos.	Nation	Player
1	GK	GER	Simon Hoffmann
3	DF	GER	Tim Hüttl
4	DF	GER	Adrian Kireski
5	FW	GER	Franz Helmer
6	MF	GER	Marcel Volkmuth
8	MF	GER	Nico Schmidt
9	FW	GER	Max Grimm
10	MF	GER	Timo Pitter
11	FW	GER	Severo Sturm
12	MF	GER	Jannik Reubelt
13	DF	GER	Jacob Engel
16	DF	GER	Steffen Behr
17	MF	GER	Jens Trunk
18	FW	GER	Marvin Weiß
19	DF	GER	Maximilian Eckstein

No.	Pos.	Nation	Player
20	FW	GER	Pascal Moll
21	DF	RUS	Egor Zelenskiy
22	DF	GER	Noah Djalek
23	DF	GER	Ingo Feser
24	MF	UKR	Heorhii Nachkebiia
25	GK	GER	Konstantin Duhai
27	MF	GER	Simon Schäffer
28	GK	UKR	Vladyslav Vertey
29	FW	GER	Marco Nickel
30	MF	GER	Manuel Fischer
31	MF	GER	Leon Heinze
32	GK	GER	Leon Walch
33	MF	GER	Joshua Endres
42	MF	GER	Fabio Bozeșan
-	FW	GER	Tim Gensichen

== Recent seasons ==
The recent season-by-season performance of the club:

Season	Division	Tier	Position
1999–2000	Bezirksoberliga Unterfranken	VI	2nd ↑
2000–01	Landesliga Bayern-Nord	V	10th
2001–02	Landesliga Bayern-Nord	V	14th
2002–03	Landesliga Bayern-Nord	V	14th
2003–04	Landesliga Bayern-Nord	V	16th ↓
2004–05	Bezirksoberliga Unterfranken	VI	6th
2005–06	Bezirksoberliga Unterfranken	VI	12th
2006–07	Bezirksoberliga Unterfranken	VI	6th
2007–08	Bezirksoberliga Unterfranken	VI	1st ↑
2008–09	Landesliga Bayern-Nord	VI	9th
2009–10	Landesliga Bayern-Nord	VI	15th
2010–11	Landesliga Bayern-Nord	VI	13th
2011–12	Landesliga Bayern-Nord	VI	2nd ↑
2012–13	Bayernliga Nord	V	8th
2013–14	Bayernliga Nord	V	2nd
2014–15	Bayernliga Nord	V	9th
2015–16	Bayernliga Nord	V	8th
2016–17	Bayernliga Nord	V	3rd
2017–18	Bayernliga Nord	V	2nd
2018–19	Bayernliga Nord	V	1st ↑
2019–21	Regionalliga Bayern	IV	5th
2021–22	Regionalliga Bayern	IV	6th
2022–23	Regionalliga Bayern	IV	11th
2023–24	Regionalliga Bayern	IV	4th
2024–25	Regionalliga Bayern	IV	13th
2025–26	Regionalliga Bayern	IV	6th

- With the introduction of the Bezirksoberligas in 1988 as the new fifth tier, below the Landesligas, all leagues below dropped one tier. With the introduction of the Regionalligas in 1994 and the 3. Liga in 2008 as the new third tier, below the 2. Bundesliga, all leagues below dropped one tier. With the establishment of the Regionalliga Bayern as the new fourth tier in Bavaria in 2012 the Bayernliga was split into a northern and a southern division, the number of Landesligas expanded from three to five and the Bezirksoberligas abolished. All leagues from the Bezirksligas onwards were elevated one tier.
- The 2020–21 Regionalliga Bayern season has been cancelled due to the COVID-19 pandemic in Germany, and the original 2019–20 season was extended until spring 2021.

=== Key ===
↑ Promoted	↓ Relegated
