= Michael Eberwein =

German footballer (born 1996)

Personal information
- Date of birth: 11 March 1996 (age 30)
- Place of birth: Dellnhausen, Germany
- Height: 1.92 m (6 ft 4 in)
- Position: Midfielder

Team information
- Current team: TSV 1860 Munich
- Number: 13

Youth career
- SV Oberhaindlfing
- –2009: SE Freising
- 2009–2015: Bayern Munich

Senior career*
Years	Team	Apps	(Gls)
2015–2018	Borussia Dortmund II	84	(28)
2018–2019	Fortuna Köln	38	(4)
2019–2020	Holstein Kiel	2	(0)
2019–2020	Holstein Kiel II	1	(0)
2020–2022	Hallescher FC	71	(20)
2022–2026	Borussia Dortmund II	133	(19)
2026–	TSV 1860 Munich	8	(5)
- * Club domestic league appearances and goals as of 27 September 2026

Michael Eberwein (born 11 March 1996) is a German professional footballer who plays as a midfielder for Regionalliga Bayern club TSV 1860 Munich.

== Career ==
In June 2019, it was announced Eberwein would join 2. Bundesliga side Holstein Kiel from 3. Liga club SC Fortuna Köln for the 2019–20 season. He agreed a two-year contract until 2021.

On 25 October 2019, Eberwein became the first non-playing substitute to concede a penalty kick in professional football. In the game between Holstein Kiel and VfL Bochum, Eberwein (warming up behind the outer goal-line) involuntarily stopped a kick by Bochum inside the penalty area, leading to a penalty kick for Bochum and a yellow card for Eberwein.

He signed for 3. Liga side Hallescher FC on a two-year contract in September 2020.
