= Eilenriedestadion =

Football stadium in Hanover, Germany

Coordinates: 52°22′35.72″N 9°46′22.44″E

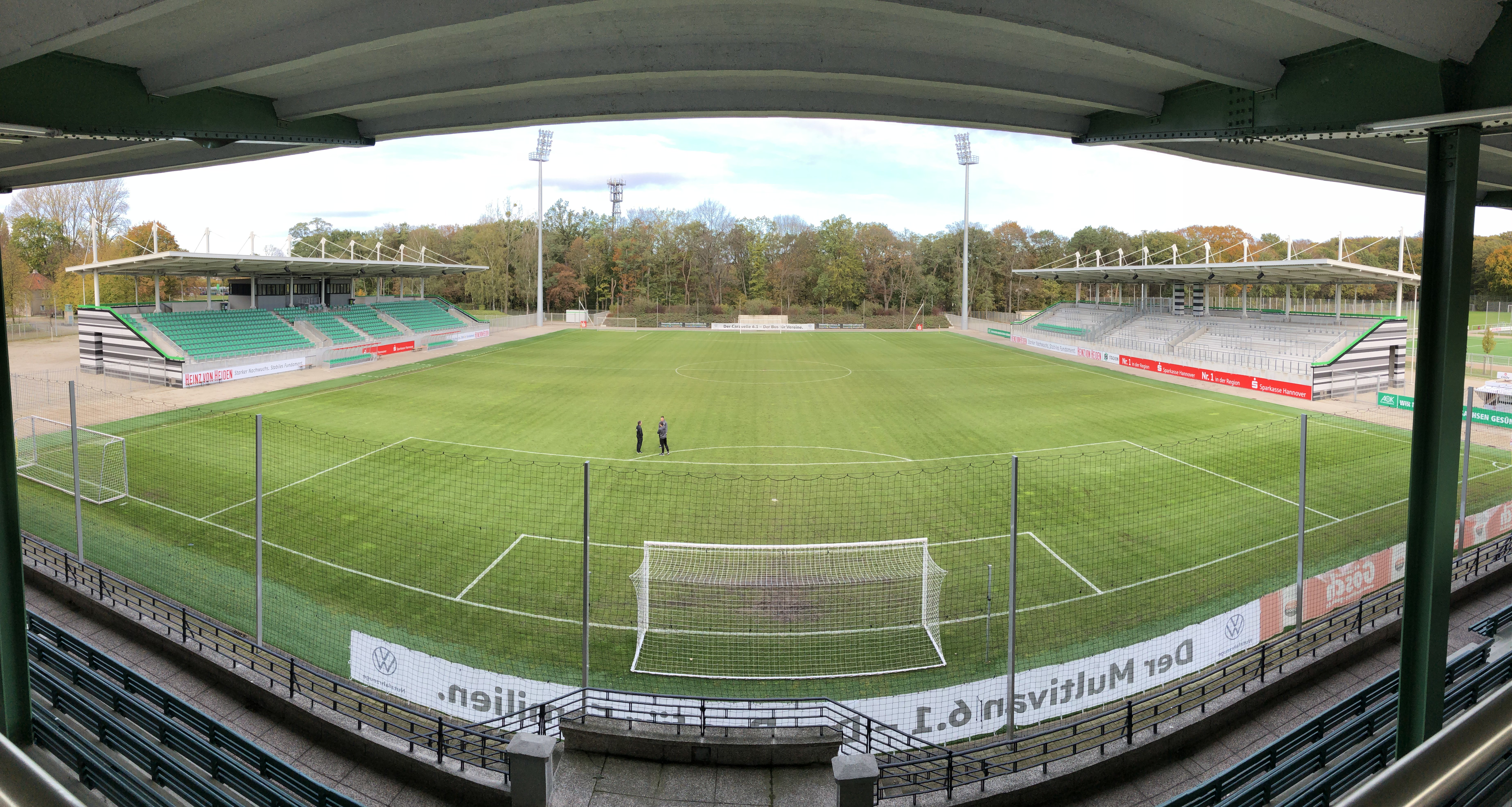

The Eilenriedestadion (also known as the 96-Stadion) is a football stadium in Hanover, Germany. It is the home ground of the reserve team of Bundesliga club Hannover 96, Hannover 96 II, and is situated at the edge of the Eilenriede forest in the centre of the city.

== History ==
The Eilenriedestadion was built in 1921, under the name "Stadion der Stadt Hannover" (Eng: Stadium of Hannover City). It could hold 25,000 at this time.

In 1934, it was renamed the Hindenburg-Kampfbahn (Eng: Hindenburg Arena). A pillar still standing in the entrance today is inscribed: "Hindenburg Kampfbahn der Stadt Hannover, erbaut 1921". After World War II, it briefly reverted to being named "Stadion der Stadt Hannover", before changing to its current title.

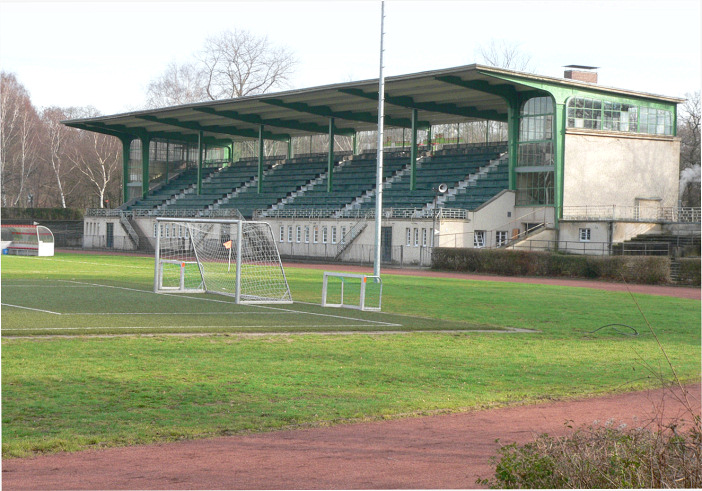
Grandstand

Shortly after its construction, Hannover 96 moved to here from the Stadion Radrennbahn (a cycling track) as that was too small for tournaments against the likes of Eintracht Braunschweig or Arminia Hannover. They remained here until 1959, when the club eventually left to move to the brand new Niedersachsenstadion. However, the club's youth and amateur sides continue to play here today.

In 1931 and 1937, the Germany national team played (and won) two internationals here against Denmark (4–2) and Belgium (1–0).

In 2000 the recently refurbished stadium hosted the centenary celebrations of the German Rugby Federation, including the Centenary Match between a German Rugby Federation selection and the famous British Barbarians (19–47).

In 2005, it was partly redeveloped to be used as a training base during that summer's Confederations Cup.

Poland used this stadium as a training ground during UEFA Euro 2024 hosted in Germany.
