= Mathew Collins =

Swiss footballer

Personal information
- Full name: Mathew Thomas Clemence Collins
- Date of birth: 1 December 2004 (age 21)
- Place of birth: Geneva, Switzerland
- Height: 1.74 m (5 ft 9 in)
- Position: Midfielder

Team information
- Current team: 1860 Munich
- Number: 5

Youth career
- –2022: Astoria Walldorf
- 2022–2023: Hannover 96
- 2023–2024: WSG Tirol

Senior career*
Years	Team	Apps	(Gls)
2024–2025	WSG Tirol II	53	(9)
2025–2026	Austria Salzburg	4	(0)
2025–2026	Austria Salzburg II	8	(1)
2026–	1860 Munich	4	(0)
- * Club domestic league appearances and goals as of 5 October 2026

Mathew Thomas Clemence Collins (born 1 December 2004) is a Swiss professional footballer who plays as a midfielder for Regionalliga Bayern club 1860 Munich.

== Early life ==
Collins was born in Switzerland, and lived in Miami, Florida, prior to attending a football boarding school in Evian, France, at the age of 14 years-old; at 16, he moved to Germany to play in the football academy of Astoria Walldorf.

== Career ==
After playing in Germany for FC Astoria Walldorf and Hannover 96, Collins signed for Austrian club WSG Tirol in summer 2023. After playing for the club in the Regionalliga, ahead of the 2024–25 season he appeared in pre-season for the first-team.

He signed for newly promoted Austrian 2. Liga club Austria Salzburg in June 2025. He made his debut in the 2. Liga for Austria Salzburg as a substitute away against SC Bregenz in a 0–0 draw on 26 September 2025. On 31 July 2026, he signed with 1860 Munich for the 2026–27 season.

== Personal life ==
He is the son of translator Orianne Cevey and English musician Phil Collins. His brother Nicolas is a drummer, and his half-sister Lily is an actress.
