= Hannover 96 II =

- Full name: Hannoverscher Sport-Verein von 1896 II
- Stadium: Eilenriedestadion
- Capacity: 2,500
- Head Coach: Lars Barlemann
- League: Regionalliga Nord
- 2025–26: Regionalliga Nord, 6th of 18
Home colours	Away colours	Third colours

Hannover 96 II is a German association football team from the city of Hanover, Lower Saxony. It is the reserve team of Hannover 96. The team's greatest success has been winning the now defunct German amateur football championship on three occasions, in 1959–60, 1963–64 and 1964–65.

The team also participated in the first round of the German Cup, the DFB-Pokal, on five occasions, in 1966–67, 1976–77, 1981–82, 1982–83 and 2004–05, without ever advancing further.

== History ==
The team, playing as Hannover 96 Amateure, first appeared in the highest league of Lower Saxony, the tier two Amateuroberliga Niedersachsen West, after promotion in 1959. The team won the league in its first season there but was than moved to the eastern division which it won in 1963–64. The Amateurliga Niedersachsen became a unified league from 1964 onwards and Hannover 96 won the first three league titles from 1964 to 1967.

Hannover 96 II became the first reserve team to reach the final of the German amateur championship when it defeated BV Osterfeld 3–0 in the replay of the 1959–60 final. It took two more titles in 1963–64 and 1964–65, on both occasions defeating SV Wiesbaden in the final. Two unsuccessful final appearances followed in 1965–66 and 1966–67, losing to Werder Bremen Amateure and STV Horst-Emscher. The 1966 final was to be the only one contested by two reserve sides while the 1967 was the last for the team.

After the 1966–67 season the team form declined somewhat, still remaining a strong side in the Amateurliga but not winning another title. At the end of the 1973–74 season Hannover failed to qualify for the new Oberliga Nord, finishing fourth when a top-three finish was required. In 1984–85 the team was relegated from what had now become the Verbandsliga Niedersachsen, made an immediate return the following season but suffered another relegation in 1990. Hannover once more returned to the Verbandsliga and, in 1993–94, qualified for the new tier four Oberliga Niedersachsen/Bremen, finishing 14th, the lowest-possible spot to qualify. The team played in the Oberliga for three seasons as a lower table side until relegation in 1997.

Back in the western division of the Verbandsliga, once more divided, Hannover finished low in the table in 1998 and 1999 but won the league in 1999–2000 and returned to the Oberliga. Another relegationin 2001 was followed by promotion in 2003. A fifth place in the league in 2003–04 qualified the team for the re-formed Oberliga Nord where it played for the next four seasons. A league reform in 2008, when the 3. Liga was introduced, took Hannover up to the Regionalliga Nord.

The club ended the 2023–24 Regionalliga Nord season as champions and won the promotion play-offs against Würzburger Kickers, becoming the first reserve team of a 2. Bundesliga club to play in the 3. Liga since its inception.

Hannover 96 II has participated in the first round of the German Cup, the DFB-Pokal, on five occasions, in 1966–67, 1976–77, 1981–82, 1982–83 and 2004–05. On each occasion the team was knocked-out in the first round, by Borussia Neunkirchen, Bayern Munich, VfB Eppingen, Bayer Leverkusen and Rot-Weiß Oberhausen respectively.

== Honours ==
The club's honours:

- German amateur championship
  - Champions: 1959–60, 1963–64, 1964–65
  - Runners-up: 1965–66, 1966–67
- Amateurliga Niedersachsen
  - Champions: 1959–60, 1963–64, 1964–65, 1965–66, 1966–67
- Verbandsliga Niedersachsen-West
  - Champions: 1999–2000, 2002–03
- Regionalliga Nord
  - Champions: 2023–24
- Lower Saxony Cup
  - Winners: 1981–82

== Recent seasons ==
The recent season-by-season performance of the club:

Season	Division	Tier	Position
2003–04	Oberliga Niedersachsen/Bremen	IV	5th
2004–05	Oberliga Nord	IV	11th
2005–06	Oberliga Nord	IV	5th
2006–07	Oberliga Nord	IV	6th
2007–08	Oberliga Nord	IV	4th ↑
2008–09	Regionalliga Nord	IV	6th
2009–10	Regionalliga Nord	IV	8th
2010–11	Regionalliga Nord	IV	9th
2011–12	Regionalliga Nord	IV	6th
2012–13	Regionalliga Nord	IV	4th
2013–14	Regionalliga Nord	IV	11th
2014–15	Regionalliga Nord	IV	14th
2015–16	Regionalliga Nord	IV	12th
2016–17	Regionalliga Nord	IV	11th
2017–18	Regionalliga Nord	IV	8th
2018–19	Regionalliga Nord	IV	6th
2019–20	Regionalliga Nord	IV	12th
2020–21	Regionalliga Nord – "Süd" group	IV	6th
2021–22	Regionalliga Nord	IV	9th
2022–23	Regionalliga Nord	IV	3rd
2023–24	Regionalliga Nord	IV	1st ↑
2024–25	3. Liga	III	18th ↓
2025–26	Regionalliga Nord	IV	6th

- With the introduction of the 3. Liga in 2008 as the new third tier, below the 2. Bundesliga, all leagues below dropped one tier.

↑ Promoted	↓ Relegated

== Players ==
=== Current squad ===
As of 8 September 2026

Note: Flags indicate national team as defined under FIFA eligibility rules; some limited exceptions apply. Players may hold more than one non-FIFA nationality.

No.	Pos.	Nation	Player
1	GK	GER	Jonas Schwanke
2	DF	GER	Manuel Braun (captain)
3	DF	GER	Alexander Babitsch
4	DF	MAR	Ilias Ebnoutalib
5	DF	GER	Pepe Lorenz
6	MF	GER	Noah Engelbreth
7	FW	GER	Florent Aliqki
8	MF	GER	Alexander Vogel
9	FW	GER	Merlin Sinanovic
11	FW	GER	Suheib-Elias Ali
13	MF	GER	Ole Wegner
14	MF	GER	Julius Meusel
15	MF	JPN	Asuma Ikari (on loan from Mito HollyHock)
16	FW	GER	Yunus Ünal
17	FW	GER	Oskar Schwarz

No.	Pos.	Nation	Player
18	MF	GER	Jasper Reinhold
19	FW	GER	Denis Husser
20	DF	GER	Yassin Jemai
21	DF	GER	Joschua Siewert
22	GK	GER	Tom Lange
23	DF	GER	Niko Gießelmann
24	MF	NED	Tim van den Heuvel
25	FW	POR	Rafael Martins Marques
27	FW	GER	Tom Hobrecht
29	FW	GER	Taycan Kurt
30	GK	ITA	Abdoulaye Gueye
31	DF	CUW	Giordinelo Meulens
32	DF	GER	Fin-Luca Rüdiger
33	MF	GER	Levent Ayçiçek
