= 1953–54 Hannover 96 season =

Hannover 96
1953–54 season
- President: Walter Daubert (1953); Heinrich Pape (1954)
- Manager: Helmut Kronsbein
- Stadium: Radrennbahn am Pferdeturm; Eilenriedestadion
- Oberliga: Winners
- Top goalscorer: League: Hannes Tkotz (19 goals); All: Hannes Tkotz (21 goals)

The 1953–54 Hannover 96 season is the 58th season in the football club's history and sixth overall season in the top flight of German football, the Oberliga Nord, and their fifth consecutive season having been reinstated in 1949 after appealing against their relegation to the Landesliga Niedersachsen in 1948. Hannover 96 won the Oberliga Nord and advanced to the championship finals for the fifth overall time, where they won their second German championship after 1938. The season covers a period from 1 July 1953 to 30 June 1954.

== Players ==
=== Squad information ===
Note: Flags indicate national team as defined under FIFA eligibility rules; some limited exceptions apply. Players may hold more than one non-FIFA nationality.

No.	Pos.	Nation	Player
–	GK	GER	Hans Bolchert
–	GK	GER	Hans Krämer
–	GK	GER	Werner Schadly
–	GK	GER	Hans-Jürgen Wickel
–	DF	GER	Heinz Bothe
–	DF	GER	Heinz Elzner
–	DF	GER	Helmut Geruschke
–	DF	GER	Hannes Kirk
–	MF	GER	Rolf Gehrcke

No.	Pos.	Nation	Player
–	MF	GER	Herbert Helfenbein
–	MF	GER	Willi Hundertmark
–	MF	GER	Werner Müller (captain)
–	FW	GER	Helmut Kruhl
–	FW	GER	Rolf Paetz
–	FW	GER	Wolfgang Piechotta
–	FW	GER	Hannes Tkotz
–	FW	GER	Heinz Wewetzer
–	FW	GER	Klemens Zielinski

== Competitions ==
Win Draw Loss

=== Overview ===
Competition	First match	Last match	Starting round	Final position	Record							
Competition	First match	Last match	Starting round	Final position	Pld	W	D	L	GF	GA	GD	Win %
Oberliga Nord	9 August 1953	11 April 1954	Matchday 1	Winners	30	20	6	4	64	26	+38	66.67
German football championship	2 May 1954	23 May 1954	Group stage	Winners	3	3	0	0	10	3	+7	100.00
Total					33	23	6	4	74	29	+45	69.70

Source: Competitions

=== Oberliga Nord ===
==== League table ====
Pos	Team	Pld	W	D	L	GF	GA	GD	Pts	Promotion, qualification or relegation
1	Hannover 96 (C)	30	20	6	4	64	26	+38	46	Qualification to German championship
2	FC St. Pauli	30	16	7	7	65	37	+28	39	
3	FC Altona 93	30	13	6	11	68	59	+9	32	
4	Eintracht Braunschweig	30	12	8	10	57	58	−1	32	
5	Werder Bremen	30	13	5	12	53	43	+10	31	

Source: RSSSF.com
Rules for classification: 1) Points;
(C) Champions

==== Results summary ====
Overall								Home						Away					
Pld	W	D	L	GF	GA	GD	Pts	W	D	L	GF	GA	GD	W	D	L	GF	GA	GD
30	20	6	4	64	26	+38	46	10	3	2	27	12	+15	10	3	2	37	14	+23

==== Results by round ====
Round	1	2	3	4	5	6	7	8	9	10	11	12	13	14	15	16	17	18	19	20	21	22	23	24	25	26	27	28	29	30
Ground	H	A	H	A	H	H	A	H	A	H	A	A	H	H	A	H	A	H	A	H	A	H	A	H	A	A	H	A	H	A
Result	W	W	W	W	W	W	W	W	W	W	W	L	D	W	W	D	W	W	W	W	D	D	D	L	W	W	W	D	L	L
Position	4	1	1	1	1	1	1	1	1	1	1	1	1	1	1	1	1	1	1	1	1	1	1	1	1	1	1	1	1	1

A = Away; H = Home; W = Win; D = Draw; L = Loss

==== Matches ====
9 August 1953 1	Hannover 96	1–0	Hamburger SV	Hanover
	Müller 79'	Report		Stadium: Eilenriedestadion; Attendance: 15,000; Referee: Walter

23 August 1953 2	Holstein Kiel	1–6	Hannover 96	Kiel
	Schmuck 42'	Report	Wewetzer 4', 87'; Tkotz 21', 25'; Paetz 62', 73'	Stadium: Holstein-Stadion; Attendance: 5,000; Referee: Hollnagel

30 August 1953 3	Hannover 96	2–0	Bremer SV	Hanover
	Piechotta 57'; Wewetzer 75'	Report		Stadium: Radrennbahn am Pferdeturm; Attendance: 5,000; Referee: Ewald Skuballa

6 September 1953 4	Eintracht Braunschweig	1–5	Hannover 96	Braunschweig
	Herz 59'	Report	Tkotz 3', 35', 77', 85'; Wewetzer 90'	Stadium: Eintracht-Stadion; Attendance: 25,000; Referee: Walter Zimmermann

13 September 1953 5	Hannover 96	2–0	Altona 93	Hanover
	Piechotta 21'; Paetz 47'	Report		Stadium: Radrennbahn am Pferdeturm; Attendance: 14,000; Referee: Banasiak

20 September 1953 6	Hannover 96	3–1	Arminia Hannover	Hanover
	Wewetzer 16' (pen.), 33'; Tkotz 79'	Report	Heyduck 84' (pen.)	Stadium: Eilenriedestadion; Attendance: 30,000; Referee: Scheiblich

27 September 1953 7	Harburger TB	1–4	Hannover 96	Hamburg
	Dammers 40'	Report	Piechotta 53'; Wewetzer 63'; Paetz 85'; Zielinski 87'	Stadium: Sportanlage Jahnhöhe; Attendance: 8,000; Referee: Rolf Seekamp

4 October 1953 8	Hannover 96	2–1	Göttingen 05	Hanover
	Piechotta 73'; Zielinski 82'	Report	Kuzniewski 15'	Stadium: Radrennbahn am Pferdeturm; Attendance: 10,000; Referee: Dobberahn

18 October 1953 9	Werder Bremen	1–2	Hannover 96	Bremen
	Behring 74'	Report	Tkotz 9', 74'	Stadium: Weser-Stadion; Attendance: 25,000; Referee: Ewald Skuballa

25 October 1953 10	Hannover 96	3–0	VfB Lübeck	Hanover
	Kruhl 3', 89'; Tkotz 61'	Report		Stadium: Radrennbahn am Pferdeturm; Attendance: 15,000; Referee: Neumann

1 November 1953 11	FC St. Pauli	0–1	Hannover 96	Hamburg
		Report	Wewetzer 68'	Stadium: Millerntor-Stadion; Attendance: 26,000; Referee: Praefke

8 November 1953 12	VfL Osnabrück	2–1	Hannover 96	Osnabrück
	Schönhöft 22'; Alpert 83'	Report	Tkotz 60'	Stadium: Stadion an der Bremer Brücke; Attendance: 20,000; Referee: Scheiblich

15 November 1953 13	Hannover 96	0–0	Eimsbütteler TV	Hanover
		Report		Stadium: Radrennbahn am Pferdeturm; Attendance: 18,000; Referee: Rannersmann

18 November 1953 14	Hannover 96	2–0	Bremerhaven 93	Hanover
	Wewetzer 64'; Tkotz 69'	Report		Stadium: Radrennbahn am Pferdeturm; Attendance: 12,000; Referee: Gerhard Schulenburg

6 December 1953 15	Victoria Hamburg	0–3	Hannover 96	Hamburg
		Report	Piechotta 38'; Wewetzer 59'; Tkotz 70'	Stadium: Stadion Hoheluft; Attendance: 6,000; Referee: Erich Asmussen

13 December 1953 16	Hannover 96	2–2	FC St. Pauli	Hanover
	Tkotz 15'; Wewetzer 85'	Report	Wehrmann 39'; Brüggen 66'	Stadium: Eilenriedestadion; Attendance: 20,000; Referee: Walter

27 December 1953 17	VfB Lübeck	0–2	Hannover 96	Lübeck
		Report	Kruhl 17'; Tkotz 70'	Stadium: Stadion Lohmühle; Attendance: 12,000; Referee: Neumann

3 January 1954 18	Hannover 96	3–2	Victoria Hamburg	Hanover
	Wewetzer 10'; Paetz 70'; Müller 75'	Report	Muuhs 52'; Engelmann 78'	Stadium: Radrennbahn am Pferdeturm; Attendance: 10,000; Referee: Praefke

10 January 1954 19	Bremerhaven 93	1–3	Hannover 96	Bremerhaven
	Machnicki 36'	Report	Wewetzer 41', 90'; Tkotz 56'	Stadium: Zollinlandstadion; Attendance: 12,000; Referee: Ewald Skuballa

17 January 1954 20	Hannover 96	4–1	Werder Bremen	Hanover
	Paetz 70'; Wewetzer 77', 83'; Tkotz 88'	Report	Haase 54'	Stadium: Radrennbahn am Pferdeturm; Attendance: 15,000; Referee: Erich Asmussen

24 January 1954 21	Eimsbütteler TV	1–1	Hannover 96	Hamburg
	Rohrberg 41'	Report	Ahrens 52' (o.g.)	Stadium: ETV-Sportzentrum Hoheluft; Attendance: 10,000; Referee: Laternicht

31 January 1954 22	Hannover 96	1–1	Holstein Kiel	Hanover
	Kruhl 32'	Report	Ehlers 88'	Stadium: Radrennbahn am Pferdeturm; Attendance: 8,000; Referee: Hollnagel

7 February 1954 23	Arminia Hannover	1–1	Hannover 96	Hanover
	Apel 56'	Report	Paetz 63'	Stadium: Stadion am Bischofsholer Damm; Attendance: 20,000; Referee: Eix

14 February 1954 24	Hannover 96	0–2	Eintracht Braunschweig	Hanover
		Report	Herz 52', 73'	Stadium: Eilenriedestadion; Attendance: 23,000; Referee: Walter Zimmermann

20 February 1954 25	Bremer SV	0–2	Hannover 96	Bremen
		Report	Zielinski 64', 82' (pen.)	Stadium: Weser-Stadion; Attendance: 10,000; Referee: Praefke

7 March 1954 26	Altona 93	0–3	Hannover 96	Hamburg
		Report	Tkotz 17'; Müller 41'; Wewetzer 65'	Stadium: Adolf-Jäger-Kampfbahn; Attendance: 10,000; Referee: Gerhard Pooch

14 March 1954 27	Hannover 96	1–0	Harburger TB	Hanover
	Wewetzer 14'	Report		Stadium: Radrennbahn am Pferdeturm; Attendance: 10,000; Referee: Otto

21 March 1954 28	Göttingen 05	3–3	Hannover 96	Göttingen
	Wasch 5', 84'; Kling 23'	Report	Elzner 7', 9'; Kruhl 87'	Stadium: Jahnstadion; Attendance: 18,000; Referee: Gerhard Schulenburg

4 April 1954 29	Hannover 96	1–2	VfL Osnabrück	Hanover
	Tkotz 70'	Report	Schönhöft 34'; Haseldiek 44'	Stadium: Radrennbahn am Pferdeturm; Attendance: 10,000; Referee: Ewald Skuballa

11 April 1954 30	Hamburger SV	2–0	Hannover 96	Hamburg
	Wojtkowiak 13', 70'	Report		Stadium: Sportplatz am Rothenbaum; Attendance: 16,000; Referee: Walter

=== German football championship ===
==== Group 1 ====
Pos	Team	Pld	W	D	L	GF	GA	GR	Pts	Qualification	H96	VFB	BSV
1	Hannover 96	2	2	0	0	5	2	2.500	4	Advance to final	—	3–1	—
2	VfB Stuttgart	2	1	0	1	4	3	1.333	2		—	—	3–0
3	Berliner SV	2	0	0	2	1	5	0.200	0		1–2	—	—

Source: RSSSF
Rules for classification: 1) Points; 2) Goal ratio.

2 May 1954 Group 1	Berliner SV	1–2	Hannover 96	West Berlin
	Karlsch 82'	Report	Tkotz 5'; Kruhl 83'	Stadium: Olympiastadion; Attendance: 60,000; Referee: Jacobi

16 May 1954 Group 1	Hannover 96	3–1	VfB Stuttgart	Düsseldorf
	Paetz 32', 43'; Zielinski 46'	Report	Baitinger 50'	Stadium: Rheinstadion; Attendance: 40,000; Referee: Alois Pennig

==== Final ====
23 May 1954

Hannover 96	5–1	1. FC Kaiserslautern
Tkotz 45'; Kohlmeyer 48' (o.g.); Wewetzer 77'; Kruhl 81'; Paetz 84'	Report	Eckel 13'

Volksparkstadion, Hamburg
Attendance: 76,000
Referee: Emil Schmetzer

HANNOVER:
GK	(Germany) Hans Krämer
DF	(Germany) Hannes Kirk
DF	(Germany) Helmut Geruschke
DF	(Germany) Heinz Bothe
MF	(Germany) Werner Müller
MF	(Germany) Rolf Gehrcke
FW	(Germany) Klemens Zielinski
FW	(Germany) Heinz Wewetzer
FW	(Germany) Hannes Tkotz
FW	(Germany) Rolf Paetz
FW	(Germany) Helmut Kruhl
Manager:
(Germany) Helmut Kronsbein

KAISERSLAUTERN:
GK	(Germany) Willi Hölz
DF	(Germany) Werner Liebrich
DF	(Germany) Werner Kohlmeyer
DF	(Germany) Werner Baßler
MF	(Germany) Fritz Walter
MF	(Germany) Otto Render
MF	(Germany) Horst Eckel
FW	(Germany) Willi Wenzel
FW	(Germany) Karl Wanger
FW	(Germany) Ottmar Walter
FW	(Germany) Erwin Scheffler
Manager:
(Germany) Richard Schneider

== Statistics ==
=== Goalscorers ===
Rank	Pos	Name	Oberliga Nord	German football championship	Total
1	FW	(Germany) Hannes Tkotz	19	2	21
2	FW	(Germany) Heinz Wewetzer	18	1	19
3	FW	(Germany) Rolf Paetz	7	3	10
4	FW	(Germany) Helmut Kruhl	5	2	7
5	FW	(Germany) Wolfgang Piechotta	5	0	5
5	FW	(Germany) Klemens Zielinski	4	1	5
7	MF	(Germany) Werner Müller	3	0	3
8	DF	(Germany) Heinz Elzner	2	0	2
Own goal			1	1	2
Total			64	10	74

=== Clean sheets ===
Rank	Pos	Name	Oberliga Nord	German football championship	Total
1	GK	(Germany) Hans Krämer	11	0	11
2	GK	(Germany) Werner Schadly	1	0	1
Total			12	0	12
