= 1953–54 in West German football =

Football in Germany
- Season: 1953–54

Men's football
- Champions: Hannover 96
- DFB-Pokal: VfB Stuttgart

The 1953–54 season was the 44th season of competitive football in Germany.

== National teams ==
=== West Germany national football team ===
==== 1954 FIFA World Cup qualification ====
===== Group 1 =====
Pos	Team	Pld	W	D	L	GF	GA	GD	Pts	Qualification	Germany national football team	Saarland national football team	Norway national football team
1	West Germany (Q)	4	3	1	0	12	3	+9	7	Qualification to World Cup	—	3–0	5–1
2	Saar	4	1	1	2	4	8	−4	3		1–3	—	0–0
3	Norway	4	0	2	2	4	9	−5	2		1–1	2–3	—

(Q) Qualified to the phase indicated

Win Draw Loss

19 August 1953 1954 World Cup Q	Norway	1–1	West Germany	Oslo, Norway
	Hennum 41'	Report	F. Walter 44'	Stadium: Ullevaal Stadion; Attendance: 32,266; Referee: (Netherlands) W. B. Aussum

11 October 1953 1954 World Cup Q	West Germany	3–0	Saar	Stuttgart, Germany
	Morlock 13', 51'; Schade 71'	Report		Stadium: Neckarstadion; Attendance: 50,000; Referee: (Netherlands) Karel van der Meer

22 November 1953 1954 World Cup Q	West Germany	5–1	Norway	Hamburg, Germany
	Morlock 26', 63'; O. Walter 69'; F. Walter 80'; Rahn 86'	Report	Nordahl 26'	Stadium: Volksparkstadion; Attendance: 76,000; Referee: (England) Archer Luty

28 March 1954 1954 World Cup Q	Saar	1–3	West Germany	Saarbrücken, Saarland
	Martin 67' (pen.)	Report	Morlock 37', 51'; Schäfer 83'	Stadium: Ludwigsparkstadion; Attendance: 53,000; Referee: (Netherlands) Jan Bronkhorst

==== 1954 FIFA World Cup ====
Pos	Team	Pld	W	D	L	GF	GA	GD	Pts	Qualification
1	Hungary	2	2	0	0	17	3	+14	4	Advance to the knockout stage
2	West Germany	2	1	0	1	7	9	−2	2 (Note: Second place decided over through play-off: West Germany 7–2 Turkey.)	Advance to the knockout stage
3	Turkey	2	1	0	1	8	4	+4	2	
4	South Korea	2	0	0	2	0	16	−16	0	

Source: FIFA
Notes:

Win Draw Loss

17 June 1954 Group 2	West Germany	4–1	Turkey	Bern, Switzerland
18:00 CET (UTC+1)	Schäfer 14'; Klodt 52'; O. Walter 60'; Morlock 84'	Report	Mamat 2'	Stadium: Wankdorf Stadium; Attendance: 28,000; Referee: (Portugal) José da Costa Vieira

20 June 1954 Group 2	Hungary	8–3	West Germany	Basel, Switzerland
16:50 CET (UTC+1)	Kocsis 3', 21', 69', 78'; Puskás 17'; Hidegkuti 52', 54'; J. Tóth 75'	Report	Pfaff 25'; Rahn 77'; Herrmann 84'	Stadium: St. Jakob Stadium; Attendance: 56,000; Referee: (England) William Ling

23 June 1954 Group 2 play-off	West Germany	7–2	Turkey	Zürich, Switzerland
18:00 CET (UTC+1)	O. Walter 7'; Schäfer 12', 79'; Morlock 30', 60', 77'; F. Walter 62'	Report	Ertan 21'; Küçükandonyadis 82'	Stadium: Hardturm Stadium; Attendance: 17,000; Referee: (France) Raymond Vincenti

27 June 1954 Quarter-final	West Germany	2–0	Yugoslavia	Geneva, Switzerland
17:00 CET (UTC+1)	Horvat 9' (o.g.); Rahn 85'	Report		Stadium: Charmilles Stadium; Attendance: 17,000; Referee: (Hungary) István Zsolt

30 June 1954 Semi-final	West Germany	6–1	Austria	Basel
18:00 CET (UTC+1)	Schäfer 31'; Morlock 47'; F. Walter 54' (pen.), 64' (pen.); O. Walter 61', 89'	Report	Probst 51'	Stadium: St. Jakob Stadium; Attendance: 58,000; Referee: (Italy) Vincenzo Orlandini

===== Final =====
4 July 1954
17:00 CET (UTC+1)

West Germany	3–2	Hungary
Morlock 10'; Rahn 18', 84'	Report	Puskás 6'; Czibor 8'

Wankdorf Stadium, Bern, Switzerland
Attendance: 62,500
Referee: (England) William Ling

West Germany	Hungary

GK	1	Toni Turek
RB	7	Josef Posipal
CB	10	Werner Liebrich
LB	3	Werner Kohlmeyer
HB	6	Horst Eckel
HB	8	Karl Mai
IR	13	Max Morlock
IL	16	Fritz Walter (c)
OR	12	Helmut Rahn
CF	15	Ottmar Walter
OL	20	Hans Schäfer
Manager:
Sepp Herberger

GK	1	Gyula Grosics
RB	2	Jenő Buzánszky
CB	3	Gyula Lóránt
LB	4	Mihály Lantos
HB	5	József Bozsik
HB	6	József Zakariás
RW	11	Zoltán Czibor
AM	9	Nándor Hidegkuti
LW	20	Mihály Tóth
CF	8	Sándor Kocsis
CF	10	Ferenc Puskás (c)
Manager:
Gusztáv Sebes

Assistant referees:
(Italy) Vincenzo Orlandini
(Wales) Sandy Griffiths

==== Friendly matches ====
Win Draw Loss

25 April 1954 Friendly	Switzerland	3–5	West Germany	Basel, Switzerland
	Fatton 57'; Ballaman 71'; Kernen 86'	Report	Schäfer 6', 31'; F. Walter 16', 85'; Morlock 30'	Stadium: St. Jakob Stadium; Attendance: 51,864; Referee: (Wales) Benjamin Griffith

== League season ==
=== Oberliga Nord ===
The 1953–54 season saw two new clubs in the league, Eintracht Braunschweig and Victoria Hamburg, both promoted from the Amateurliga.

Pos	Team	Pld	W	D	L	GF	GA	GD	Pts	Promotion, qualification or relegation
1	Hannover 96 (C)	30	20	6	4	64	26	+38	46	Qualification to German championship
2	FC St. Pauli	30	16	7	7	65	37	+28	39	
3	FC Altona 93	30	13	6	11	68	59	+9	32	
4	Eintracht Braunschweig	30	12	8	10	57	58	−1	32	
5	Werder Bremen	30	13	5	12	53	43	+10	31	
6	Arminia Hannover	30	12	5	13	78	77	+1	29	
7	TuS Bremerhaven 93	30	11	7	12	53	55	−2	29	
8	Eimsbütteler TV	30	11	7	12	51	55	−4	29	
9	Holstein Kiel	30	10	9	11	50	68	−18	29	
10	Göttingen 05	30	10	8	12	43	48	−5	28	
11	Hamburger SV	30	12	8	10	77	58	+19	28 (Note: Hamburger SV deducted four points for illegal payments to player Willi Schröder.)	
12	VfL Osnabrück	30	11	5	14	48	46	+2	27	
13	Bremer SV	30	11	5	14	44	56	−12	27	
14	Harburger TB	30	10	6	14	43	60	−17	26	
15	VfB Lübeck (R)	30	7	9	14	33	59	−26	23	Relegation to Amateurliga
16	Victoria Hamburg (R)	30	7	8	15	28	50	−22	22	Relegation to Amateurliga

Source: RSSSF.com
Rules for classification: 1) Points;
(C) Champions; (R) Relegated

=== Oberliga Berlin ===
The 1953–54 season saw two new clubs in the league, Kickers 1900 Berlin and Hertha Zehlendorf, both promoted from the Amateurliga Berlin.

Pos	Team	Pld	W	D	L	GF	GA	GD	Pts	Promotion, qualification or relegation
1	Berliner SV 92	22	15	4	3	58	29	+29	34	Qualification to German championship
2	Minerva 93 Berlin	22	14	3	5	59	40	+19	31	
3	Union 06 Berlin	22	12	6	4	45	30	+15	30	
4	Spandauer SV	22	12	3	7	45	35	+10	27	
5	Alemannia 90 Berlin	22	11	4	7	44	36	+8	26	
6	Tennis Borussia Berlin	22	8	8	6	38	30	+8	24	
7	Viktoria 89 Berlin	22	9	3	10	51	42	+9	21	
8	BFC Nordstern	22	7	5	10	34	40	−6	19	
9	Wacker 04 Berlin	22	6	5	11	29	36	−7	17	
10	Blau-Weiß 90 Berlin	22	5	6	11	39	47	−8	16	
11	Hertha Zehlendorf (R)	22	4	6	12	23	50	−27	14	Relegation to Amateurliga Berlin
12	Kickers 1900 Berlin (R)	22	0	5	17	19	69	−50	5	Relegation to Amateurliga Berlin

Source: RSSSF.com
Rules for classification: 1) Points;
(R) Relegated

=== Oberliga West ===
The 1953–54 season saw two new clubs in the league, Rheydter SV and VfL Bochum, both promoted from the 2. Oberliga West.

Pos	Team	Pld	W	D	L	GF	GA	GD	Pts	Promotion, qualification or relegation
1	1. FC Köln	30	17	7	6	83	43	+40	41	Qualification to German championship
2	Rot-Weiss Essen	30	19	2	9	75	49	+26	40	
3	FC Schalke 04	30	16	7	7	76	51	+25	39	
4	Preußen Münster	30	11	11	8	60	54	+6	33	
5	Borussia Dortmund	30	14	4	12	69	58	+11	32	
6	Schwarz-Weiß Essen	30	13	5	12	72	53	+19	31	
7	Bayer Leverkusen	30	13	5	12	58	67	−9	31	
8	VfL Bochum	30	13	5	12	50	58	−8	31	
9	Alemannia Aachen	30	12	4	14	59	59	0	28	
10	Fortuna Düsseldorf	30	12	3	15	53	49	+4	27	
11	Meidericher SV	30	9	9	12	46	55	−9	27	
12	Borussia München-Gladbach	30	10	7	13	56	73	−17	27	
13	Preußen Dellbrück	30	10	7	13	41	55	−14	27	
14	SV Sodingen	30	11	4	15	46	56	−10	26	
15	Rheydter SV (R)	30	9	2	19	45	76	−31	20	Relegation to 2. Oberliga West
16	STV Horst-Emscher (R)	30	7	6	17	43	76	−33	20	Relegation to 2. Oberliga West

Source: RSSSF.com
Rules for classification: 1) Points;
(R) Relegated

=== Oberliga Südwest ===
The 1953–54 season saw two new clubs in the league, ASV Landau and VfR Frankenthal, both promoted from the 2. Oberliga Südwest.

Pos	Team	Pld	W	D	L	GF	GA	GD	Pts	Promotion, qualification or relegation
1	1. FC Kaiserslautern	30	26	0	4	139	33	+106	52	Qualification to German championship
2	FK Pirmasens	30	24	3	3	73	30	+43	51	
3	TuS Neuendorf	30	18	3	9	85	51	+34	39	
4	Saar 05 Saarbrücken	30	16	3	11	80	62	+18	35	
5	1. FC Saarbrücken	30	14	6	10	80	53	+27	34	
6	Phönix Ludwigshafen	30	14	6	10	49	55	−6	34	
7	FSV Mainz 05	30	13	5	12	61	50	+11	31	
8	Borussia Neunkirchen	30	12	4	14	58	54	+4	28	
9	VfR Frankenthal	30	9	9	12	38	45	−7	27	
10	Eintracht Trier	30	12	2	16	57	66	−9	26	
11	Wormatia Worms	30	10	6	14	53	68	−15	26	
12	TuRa Ludwigshafen	30	10	4	16	52	65	−13	24	
13	FV Speyer	30	10	2	18	35	80	−45	22	
14	VfR Kaiserslautern	30	9	3	18	41	69	−28	21	
15	ASV Landau (R)	30	6	5	19	27	93	−66	17	Relegation to 2. Oberliga Südwest
16	VfR Kirn (R)	30	4	5	21	34	83	−49	13	Relegation to 2. Oberliga Südwest

Source: RSSSF.com
Rules for classification: 1) Points;
(R) Relegated

=== Oberliga Süd ===
The 1953–54 season saw two new clubs in the league, Jahn Regensburg and KSV Hessen Kassel, both promoted from the 2. Oberliga Süd.

Pos	Team	Pld	W	D	L	GF	GA	GD	Pts	Promotion, qualification or relegation
1	VfB Stuttgart	30	18	7	5	64	39	+25	43	Qualification to German championship
2	Eintracht Frankfurt	30	17	8	5	70	31	+39	42	Qualification to German championship
3	Kickers Offenbach	30	16	9	5	70	38	+32	41	
4	1. FC Nürnberg	30	15	8	7	71	44	+27	38	
5	Karlsruher SC	30	14	7	9	61	53	+8	35	
6	Jahn Regensburg	30	14	5	11	42	48	−6	33	
7	FSV Frankfurt	30	11	8	11	60	56	+4	30	
8	FC Schweinfurt 05	30	12	4	14	53	50	+3	28	
9	FC Bayern Munich	30	9	10	11	42	46	−4	28	
10	VfR Mannheim	30	9	9	12	62	71	−9	27	
11	SpVgg Fürth	30	9	8	13	42	54	−12	26	
12	BC Augsburg	30	11	3	16	52	66	−14	25	
13	KSV Hessen Kassel	30	9	5	16	54	74	−20	23	
14	Stuttgarter Kickers	30	8	5	17	63	79	−16	21	
15	SV Waldhof Mannheim (R)	30	5	10	15	47	66	−19	20	Relegation to 2. Oberliga Süd
16	Viktoria Aschaffenburg (R)	30	8	4	18	44	82	−38	20	Relegation to 2. Oberliga Süd

Source: RSSSF.com
Rules for classification: 1) Points;
(R) Relegated

=== German championship ===
The 1954 German football championship was contested by the six qualified Oberliga teams and won by Hannover 96, defeating 1. FC Kaiserslautern in the final. The six clubs played single round of matches at neutral grounds in two groups of three. The two group winners then advanced to the final.

==== Group 1 ====
Pos	Team	Pld	W	D	L	GF	GA	GR	Pts	Qualification	H96	VFB	BSV
1	Hannover 96	2	2	0	0	5	2	2.500	4	Advance to final	—	3–1	—
2	VfB Stuttgart	2	1	0	1	4	3	1.333	2		—	—	3–0
3	Berliner SV	2	0	0	2	1	5	0.200	0		1–2	—	—

Source: RSSSF
Rules for classification: 1) Points; 2) Goal ratio.

==== Group 2 ====
Pos	Team	Pld	W	D	L	GF	GA	GR	Pts	Qualification	FCK	KOE	SGE
1	1. FC Kaiserslautern	2	2	0	0	5	3	1.667	4	Advance to final	—	4–3	1–0
2	1. FC Köln	2	1	0	1	6	6	1.000	2		—	—	3–2
3	Eintracht Frankfurt	2	0	0	2	2	4	0.500	0		—	—	—

Source: RSSSF
Rules for classification: 1) Points; 2) Goal ratio.

==== Final ====
23 May 1954

Hannover 96	5–1	1. FC Kaiserslautern
Tkotz 45'; Kohlmeyer 48' (o.g.); Wewetzer 77'; Kruhl 81'; Paetz 84'	Report	Eckel 13'

Attendance: 76,000
Referee: Emil Schmetzer

HANNOVER:
GK	(Germany) Hans Krämer
DF	(Germany) Hannes Kirk
DF	(Germany) Helmut Geruschke
DF	(Germany) Heinz Bothe
MF	(Germany) Werner Müller
MF	(Germany) Rolf Gehrcke
FW	(Germany) Klemens Zielinski
FW	(Germany) Heinz Wewetzer
FW	(Germany) Hannes Tkotz
FW	(Germany) Rolf Paetz
FW	(Germany) Helmut Kruhl
Manager:
(Germany) Helmut Kronsbein

KAISERSLAUTERN:
GK	(Germany) Willi Hölz
DF	(Germany) Werner Liebrich
DF	(Germany) Werner Kohlmeyer
DF	(Germany) Werner Baßler
MF	(Germany) Fritz Walter
MF	(Germany) Otto Render
MF	(Germany) Horst Eckel
FW	(Germany) Willi Wenzel
FW	(Germany) Karl Wanger
FW	(Germany) Ottmar Walter
FW	(Germany) Erwin Scheffler
Manager:
(Germany) Richard Schneider

== DFB–Pokal ==
The 1953–54 DFB-Pokal consisted eight teams competing in three rounds of a knockout tournament. VfB Stuttgart became champions by defeating 1. FC Köln 1–0 in the final.
