= List of Hannover 96 seasons =

This is a list of seasons played by Hannover 96 in German and European football, from their entry into the Südkreisliga to the present day. The club were champions in 1937–38 and 1953–54.

== Seasons ==
Season	League									DFB-Pokal	Europe	Top goalscorer(s)	
Season	Division	Pos	Pld	W	D	L	GF	GA	Pts (Note: Seasons prior to 1995–96 use the old points system of 2 points for a win; from 1995–96 onward the current system with 3 points for a win is used.)	DFB-Pokal	Europe	Player(s)	Goals
1920–21	Südkreisliga (Note: The Südkreisliga was a localised division within the Northern German system. The winners would have to compete against other North German league winners to determine the North German representative at the national championship. Despite their four local league titles, Hannover 96 never managed to make it through to the national championship in this period.)	1	18						25				
1921–22	Südkreisliga	4	16				37	11	17				
1922–23	Südkreisliga	3	13				47	20	19				
1923–24	Südkreisliga	7	14				21	29	12				
1924–25	Südkreisliga	5	14				23	31	14				
1925–26	Südkreisliga	5	14				31	40	12				
1926–27	Südkreisliga	1	14				39	26	19				
1927–28	Südkreisliga	1	14				60	27	23				
1928–29	Südkreisliga	2	9						23				
1929–30	Südkreisliga	1	18				75	31	33				
1930–31	Südkreisliga	5	16				38	45	13				
1931–32	Südkreisliga	7	16				37	31	13				
1932–33	Südkreisliga	3	16				37	27	19				
1933–34	Gauliga Niedersachsen (Note: Prior to the formation of the Bundesliga in 1963–64, the regional champions would meet in a championship tournament to crown the national champions. Hannover 96 lost out in these in the 1934–35, 1939–40, 1940–41 and 1948–49 seasons; their two victories in 1937–38 (4–3 vs. Schalke 04) and 1953–54 (5–1 vs. 1. FC Kaiserslautern) made them German champions.)	4	18	9	2	7	54	41	20				
1934–35	Gauliga Niedersachsen	1	20	14	3	3	80	30	31				
1935–36	Gauliga Niedersachsen	2	20	11	4	5	57	32	26				
1936–37	Gauliga Niedersachsen	3	18	9	2	7	41	25	20				
1937–38	Gauliga Niedersachsen	1	18	13	2	3	77	20	28				
1938–39	Gauliga Niedersachsen	2	42	13	2	3	67	19	28				
1939–40	Gauliga Niedersachsen	1	10	9	1	0	41	14	19				
1940–41	Gauliga Niedersachsen	1	10	9	0	1	48	13	18				
1941–42	Gauliga Niedersachsen	3	10	5	1	4	24	19	13				
1942–43	Gauliga Niedersachsen	5	17	7	4	6	52	42	18				
1943–44	Gauliga Niedersachsen	5	17	6	2	9	32	48	14				
The league was effectively ended during 1944 due to World War II. The club played some games in regional and city leagues in the meantime.
1947–48	Oberliga Nord	11	22	6	1	15	32	69	13				
1948–49	Landesliga Niedersachsen	Did not complete the league season after winning an appeal to regain their Oberliga place (Note: Early in the 1948–49 season, Hannover 96 won an appeal against their relegation of the previous season, as Holstein Kiel, who had narrowly survived at their expense, had fielded an illegal player. The club were awarded their place back in the top flight for the next season. Due to this, Hannover 96 immediately ended their 1948–49 league campaign (after playing three matches) and only played friendlies for the remainder of the season.)											
1949–50	Oberliga Nord	7	30	13	5	12	58	61	31				
1950–51	Oberliga Nord	11	32	11	7	14	60	66	28				
1951–52	Oberliga Nord	11	30	11	6	13	55	59	28				
1952–53	Oberliga Nord	7	30	10	10	10	52	53	30				
1953–54	Oberliga Nord	1	30	20	6	4	64	26	46				
1954–55	Oberliga Nord	5	30	14	6	10	52	41	34	First round (Note: Entry into the DFB-Pokal only became automatic for all top-tier clubs with the introduction of the Bundesliga in 1963–64. In the period from the foundation of the cup in 1953 until this point, only the winners of the regional cup competitions, along with the national league champions and national amateur champions were entered. Hannover 96's appearance in 1954–55 was via their win of the German championship in the previous season.)			
1955–56	Oberliga Nord	2	30	16	6	8	57	39	38				
1956–57	Oberliga Nord	3	30	15	7	8	58	34	37				
1957–58	Oberliga Nord	10	30	11	5	14	47	46	27				
1958–59	Oberliga Nord	6	30	12	8	10	45	41	32		Fairs Cup first round		
1959–60	Oberliga Nord	6	30	16	2	12	61	51	34		Fairs Cup first round		
1960–61	Oberliga Nord	5	30	15	5	10	64	43	35		Fairs Cup first round		
1961–62	Oberliga Nord	13	30	6	11	13	47	60	23		Fairs Cup first round		
1962–63	Oberliga Nord	9	30	12	3	15	47	61	27				
1963–64	Regionalliga Nord (Note: Hannover 96's application to enter the Bundesliga in its inaugural 1963–64 season was turned down, leading to them being moved to the newly created Regionalliga Nord, a second-tier division.) (Note: Hannover 96's promotion to the Bundesliga for the following season was via a playoff league involving eight teams from all five divisions of the Regionalliga.)	2	34	23	5	6	78	27	49	Round of 16		Walter Rodekamp	33
1964–65	Bundesliga	5	30	13	7	10	48	42	33	Quarter-finals		Walter Rodekamp	11
1965–66	Bundesliga	12	34	11	8	15	59	57	30	First round	Fairs Cup third round	Hans Siemensmeyer	15
1966–67	Bundesliga	9	34	13	8	13	40	46	34	First round		Walter Rodekamp Hans Siemensmeyer	9
1967–68	Bundesliga	10	34	12	10	12	48	52	34	First round	Fairs Cup first round	Jupp Heynckes	10
1968–69	Bundesliga	11	34	9	14	11	47	45	32	Quarter-finals	Fairs Cup third round	Josip Skoblar	17
1969–70	Bundesliga	13	34	11	8	15	49	61	30	Round of 16	Fairs Cup first round	Hans Siemensmeyer	12
1970–71	Bundesliga	9	34	12	9	13	53	49	33	First round		Ferdinand Keller	19
1971–72	Bundesliga	16	34	10	2	21	54	69	23	Quarter-finals		Ferdinand Keller	20
1972–73	Bundesliga	16	34	9	8	17	49	65	26	First round		Willi Reimann	14
1973–74	Bundesliga	18	34	6	10	18	50	66	22	Quarter-finals		Willi Reimann	15
1974–75	2. Bundesliga	1	38	25	4	9	93	39	54	First round		Peter Dahl	23
1975–76	Bundesliga	16	34	9	9	16	48	60	27	Second round		Peter Hayduk	11
1976–77	2. Bundesliga	5	38	18	7	13	73	48	43	First round		Klaus Wunder	21
1977–78	2. Bundesliga	5	38	19	5	14	68	57	43	First round		Jürgen Milewski	15
1978–79	2. Bundesliga	15	38	9	16	13	57	68	34	Second round		Dieter Schatzschneider	23
1979–80	2. Bundesliga	3	38	23	6	9	70	38	52	First round		Dieter Schatzschneider	34
1980–81	2. Bundesliga	4	42	31	2	9	88	49	56	Second round		Dieter Schatzschneider	26
1981–82	2. Bundesliga	5	38	19	7	12	72	52	45	Round of 16		Dieter Schatzschneider	34
1982–83	2. Bundesliga	12	38	13	10	15	70	72	36	First round		Dieter Schatzschneider	14
1983–84	2. Bundesliga	14	38	10	12	16	54	69	44	Quarter-finals		Frank Hartmann	9
1984–85	2. Bundesliga	2	38	18	14	6	79	58	50	Quarter-final		Michael Gue	14
1985–86	Bundesliga	18	34	5	8	21	43	92	18	Round of 16		Fred Schaub	9
1986–87	2. Bundesliga	1	38	23	10	5	86	48	56	Round of 16		Siegfried Reich	26
1987–88	Bundesliga	10	34	12	7	15	59	60	31	First round		Siegfried Reich	17
1988–89	Bundesliga	18	34	4	11	19	36	71	19	First round		Siegfried Reich	8
1989–90	2. Bundesliga	8	38	12	14	12	53	43	38	First round		Jochen Heisig	13
1990–91	2. Bundesliga	10	38	12	14	12	49	49	38	Second round		Jochen Heisig	17
1991–92	2. Bundesliga Nord (Note: For the 1991–92 season, the 2. Bundesliga was split into north and south divisions as it integrated the new clubs from the former East Germany.)	5	32	10	14	8	34	37	34	Winners		Martin Groth Patrick Grün Roman Wójcicki	6
1992–93	2. Bundesliga	9	46	16	16	14	60	60	48	Round of 16	Cup Winners' Cup first round	Reinhold Daschner André Sirocks	8
1993–94	2. Bundesliga	12	38	12	13	13	49	46	37	Third round		Theo Gries	8
1994–95	2. Bundesliga	12	34	10	11	13	52	50	31	Second round		Torsten Gütschow	16
1995–96	2. Bundesliga	16	34	10	7	17	38	48	37	First round		Kreso Kovacec	6
1996–97	Regionalliga Nord (Note: Promotion from the modern Regionalliga Nord relied upon winning a playoff against the Regionalliga Nordost champions. In 1996–97, Hannover 96 lost in this (1–3 vs. Energie Cottbus) and thus remained in the Regionalliga, but in 1997–98 they were victorious (2–2 vs. Tennis Borussia Berlin, 3–1 on penalties) and so gained promotion.)	1	34	26	5	3	105	25	83	Second round		Vladan Milovanović	27
1997–98	Regionalliga Nord	1	34	28	5	1	120	29	89	Round of 16		Vladan Milovanović	22
1998–99	2. Bundesliga	4	34	16	9	9	52	36	57	First round		Markus Kreuz	8
1999–2000	2. Bundesliga	10	34	12	8	14	56	56	44	Third round		Daniel Stendel	10
2000–01	2. Bundesliga	9	34	12	10	12	52	45	46	Round of 16		Jan Šimák	9
2001–02	2. Bundesliga	1	34	22	9	3	93	37	75	Round of 16		Jan Šimák	18
2002–03	Bundesliga	11	34	12	7	15	47	57	43	Second round		Fredi Bobic	14
2003–04	Bundesliga	14	34	9	10	15	49	63	37	Second round		Thomas Brdarić	12
2004–05	Bundesliga	10	34	13	6	15	34	36	45	Quarter-finals		Jiří Štajner Daniel Stendel	6
2005–06	Bundesliga	12	34	7	17	10	43	47	38	Round of 16		Thomas Brdarić	10
2006–07	Bundesliga	11	34	12	8	14	41	50	44	Quarter-finals		Arnold Bruggink Jan Rosenthal	6
2007–08	Bundesliga	8	34	13	10	11	54	56	49	Second round		Mike Hanke Szabolcs Huszti	10
2008–09	Bundesliga	11	34	10	10	14	49	69	40	Second round		Jiří Štajner	8
2009–10	Bundesliga	15	34	9	6	19	43	67	33	First round		Didier Ya Konan	9
2010–11	Bundesliga	4	34	19	3	12	49	45	60	First round		Didier Ya Konan	14
2011–12	Bundesliga	7	34	12	12	10	41	45	48	Second round	UEFA Europa League quarter-finals	Mohammed Abdellaoue	11
2012–13	Bundesliga	9	34	13	6	15	60	62	45	Round of 16	UEFA Europa League round of 32	Mame Biram Diouf	12
2013–14	Bundesliga	10	34	12	6	16	46	59	42	Second round		Szabolcs Huszti	10
2014–15	Bundesliga	13	34	9	10	15	40	56	37	Second round		Lars Stindl	10
2015–16	Bundesliga	18	34	7	4	23	31	62	25	Second round		Artur Sobiech	8
2016–17	2. Bundesliga	2	34	19	10	5	51	32	67	Round of 16		Martin Harnik	21
2017–18	Bundesliga	13	34	10	9	15	44	54	39	Second round		Niclas Füllkrug	16
2018–19	Bundesliga	17	34	5	6	23	31	71	21	Second round		Hendrik Weydandt	8
2019–20	2. Bundesliga	6	34	13	9	12	54	49	48	First round		Marvin Ducksch	15
2020–21	2. Bundesliga	13	34	12	6	16	53	51	42	Second round		Marvin Ducksch	16
2021–22	2. Bundesliga	11	34	11	9	14	35	49	42	Quarter-finals		Sebastian Kerk	11
2022–23	2. Bundesliga	10	34	12	8	14	50	55	44	Second round		Cedric Teuchert	14
2023–24	2. Bundesliga	6	34	13	13	8	59	44	52	First round		Cedric Teuchert	12
2024–25	2. Bundesliga	9	34	13	12	9	41	36	51	First round		Nicolò Tresoldi	7
2025–26	2. Bundesliga	4	34	16	12	6	60	44	60	First round		Benjamin Källman	14
