= 1954 German football championship =

1954 German championship
Deutsche Fußballmeisterschaft

Tournament details
- Country: West Germany
- Dates: 2–23 May
- Teams: 6

Final positions
- Champions: Hannover 96; 2nd German title
- Runners-up: 1. FC Kaiserslautern

Tournament statistics
- Matches played: 7
- Goals scored: 29 (4.14 per match)
- Top goal scorer(s): Otto Baitinger; Rolf Paetz; Georg Stollenwerk (3 goals each)

The 1954 German football championship was the culmination of the football season in the Federal Republic of Germany in 1953–54. Hannover 96 were crowned champions for the second time after a group stage and a final.

It was Hannover's second appearance in the German final, having previously won the championship in 1938, beating Schalke 04 4-3 after extra-time. Kaiserslautern were making their fourth appearance, and was the third time they had reached the final in four years, following their championship wins in 1951 and 1953.

The format used to determine the German champion was different from the 1953 season. Only six teams qualified for the championship, instead of eight. These six teams were split into two groups of three, and only played a single round of matches with games on neutral grounds; previously it had been home-and-away games. The reason for this format change and the reduction in the number of games was Germany's qualifying for the 1954 FIFA World Cup, held shortly after the championship final. As in the past seasons, the two group winners then played the national final.

== Qualified teams ==
The teams qualified through the 1953–54 Oberliga season:

Club	Qualified from
Hannover 96	Oberliga Nord champions
1. FC Köln	Oberliga West champions
Berliner SV 92	Oberliga Berlin champions
1. FC Kaiserslautern	Oberliga Südwest champions
VfB Stuttgart	Oberliga Süd champions
Eintracht Frankfurt	Oberliga Süd runners-up

== Competition ==
=== Group 1 ===
Pos	Team	Pld	W	D	L	GF	GA	GR	Pts	Qualification	H96	VFB	BSV
1	Hannover 96	2	2	0	0	5	2	2.500	4	Advance to final	—	3–1	—
2	VfB Stuttgart	2	1	0	1	4	3	1.333	2		—	—	3–0
3	Berliner SV	2	0	0	2	1	5	0.200	0		1–2	—	—

Source: RSSSF
Rules for classification: 1) Points; 2) Goal ratio.

2 May 1954	Berliner SV 92	1 – 2	Hannover 96	Berlin
	Karlsch 82'	Report	Tkotz 5'; Kruhl 83'	Stadium: Olympiastadion; Attendance: 60,000; Referee: Jacobi (Mannheim)

9 May 1954	VfB Stuttgart	3 – 0	Berliner SV 92	Berlin
	Waldner 35'; Baitinger 60', 69'	Report		Stadium: Olympiastadion; Attendance: 65,000; Referee: Schreiber (Eschweiler)

16 May 1954	Hannover 96	3 – 1	VfB Stuttgart	Düsseldorf
	Paetz 32', 43'; Zielinski 46'	Report	Baitinger 50'	Stadium: Rheinstadion; Attendance: 40,000; Referee: Pennig (Mannheim)

=== Group 2 ===
Pos	Team	Pld	W	D	L	GF	GA	GR	Pts	Qualification	FCK	KOE	SGE
1	1. FC Kaiserslautern	2	2	0	0	5	3	1.667	4	Advance to final	—	4–3	1–0
2	1. FC Köln	2	1	0	1	6	6	1.000	2		—	—	3–2
3	Eintracht Frankfurt	2	0	0	2	2	4	0.500	0		—	—	—

Source: RSSSF
Rules for classification: 1) Points; 2) Goal ratio.

2 May 1954	1. FC Kaiserslautern	1 – 0	Eintracht Frankfurt	Cologne
	F.Walter 82'	Report		Stadium: Müngersdorfer Stadion; Attendance: 50,000; Referee: Ternieden (Oberhausen)

8 May 1954	1. FC Köln	3 – 2	Eintracht Frankfurt	Ludwigshafen
	Stollenwerk 31', 39'; Dörner 50'	Report	Heilig 25'; Weilbächer 55'	Stadium: Südweststadion; Attendance: 35,000; Referee: Eix (Emden)

16 May 1954	1. FC Kaiserslautern	4 – 3	1. FC Köln	Stuttgart
	F.Walter 32' (pen.); Scheffler 43'; Wenzel 48'; O.Walter 68'	Report	Schäfer 63'; Nordmann 79'; Stollenwerk 83'	Stadium: Neckarstadion; Attendance: 65,000; Referee: Winkler (Nuremberg)

=== Final ===
23 May 1954

Hannover 96	5–1	1. FC Kaiserslautern
Tkotz 45'; Kohlmeyer 48' (o.g.); Wewetzer 77'; Kruhl 81'; Paetz 84'	Report	Eckel 13'

Volksparkstadion, Hamburg
Attendance: 76,000
Referee: E. Schmetzer (Mannheim)

HANNOVER 96:
GK	1	(West Germany) Hans Krämer
RB	2	(West Germany) Helmut Geruschke
CB	5	(West Germany) Heinz Bothe
LB	3	(West Germany) Hannes Kirk
RH	4	(West Germany) Werner Müller (c)
LH	6	(West Germany) Rolf Gehrcke
OR	7	(West Germany) Heinz Wewetzer
IR	8	(West Germany) Rolf Paetz
CF	9	(West Germany) Hannes Tkotz
IL	10	(West Germany) Klemens Zielinski
OL	11	(West Germany) Helmut Kruhl
Manager:
(West Germany) Helmut Kronsbein

1. FC KAISERSLAUTERN:
GK	1	(West Germany) Willi Hölz
RB	2	(West Germany) Werner Baßler
CB	5	(West Germany) Werner Liebrich
LB	3	(West Germany) Werner Kohlmeyer
RH	4	(West Germany) Horst Eckel
LH	6	(West Germany) Otto Render
OR	7	(West Germany) Erwin Scheffler
IR	8	(West Germany) Fritz Walter (c)
CF	9	(West Germany) Ottmar Walter
IL	10	(West Germany) Willi Wenzel
OL	11	(West Germany) Karl Wanger
Manager:
(West Germany) Richard Schneider

== Sources ==
- German Championship 1953-54 at Weltfussball.de
- Germany - Championship 1954 at RSSSF.com
- German championship 1954 at Fussballdaten.de
