= List of Hannover 96 records and statistics =

This is a list of records set by the football team Hannover 96.

== Team records ==
- Biggest home win: 13–1 v Rasen SV Hildesheim 06 (1933–34 Gauliga Niedersachsen)
- Biggest home win (Bundesliga): 6–0 v Borussia Neunkirchen (18 September 1965)
- Biggest home win (DFB Cup): 8–1 v Borussia Hannover (29 August 1980)
- Biggest away win: 7–2 v VfB Oldenburg (2. Bundesliga; 30 May 1981)
- Biggest away win (Bundesliga):
  - 5–1 v SC Tasmania 1900 Berlin (2 October 1965)
  - 5–1 v Kickers Offenbach (27 February 1971)
- Biggest away win (DFB Cup): 7-0 v Marathon 1902 Berlin (1 August 1991)
- Biggest home defeat: 0–10 v FC St. Pauli (1947–48 Oberliga Nord)
- Biggest home defeat (Bundesliga):
  - 0–5 v FC Bayern Munich (1 February 1986)
  - 0–5 v KFC Uerdingen 05 (12 November 1988)
  - 0–5 v VfL Wolfsburg (16 May 2009)
- Biggest home defeat (DFB Cup): 0–4 v SV Darmstadt 98 (27 August 1982)
- Biggest away defeat (Bundesliga):
  - 0–7 v VfB Stuttgart (8 February 1986)
  - 0–7 v FC Bayern Munich (18 April 2010)
- Biggest away defeat (DFB Cup): 1–5 v SV Waldhof Mannheim (12 November 1985)
- Most league goals (season): 120 (1997–98 Regionalliga Nord)
- Most points:
  - Two points for a win: 56 (1980–81 2. Bundesliga, 1986–87 2. Bundesliga)
  - Three points for a win: 89 (1997–98 Regionalliga Nord)

== Appearances ==
- Most league appearances: Jörg Sievers - 384 (1989–2003)
- Most appearances (all games): Peter Anders - 458 (1966–1981)
- Most Bundesliga appearances: Steven Cherundolo - 300 (1999–2014)
- Most international appearances while at club: Steven Cherundolo - 87 (1999–2014)

== Goals ==
- Most league goals: Dieter Schatzschneider - 135 (1978–82; 1988–89)
- Most Bundesliga goals: Hans Siemensmeyer - 72 (1965–74)
- Most European goals: Hans Siemensmeyer - 7 (1965–74)
- Most league goals (season): Dieter Schatzschneider - 34 (1981–82)

== Transfers ==
- Highest fee paid: €9 million to Rubin Kazan for Jonathas (2017)
- Highest fee received: €8 million from Stoke City for Joselu (2015)
