= Daschner =

Daschner is a German surname. Notable people with the surname include:

- Lukas Daschner (born 1998), German footballer
- Reinhold Daschner (born 1969), German footballer and manager
- Stephan Daschner (born 1988), German ice hockey player
