= Walter Risse =

German footballer (1893–1969)

Personal information
- Date of birth: 2 December 1893
- Place of birth: Düsseldorf, Germany
- Date of death: 16 June 1969 (aged 75)
- Position: Defender

Senior career*
Years	Team	Apps	(Gls)
1922–1923	Düsseldorfer SC 99		
1924–1933	Hamburger SV		

International career
1923–1928	Germany	8	(0)

Managerial career
- 1934–1947: Eimsbütteler TV
- 1948–1949: Eimsbütteler TV
- 1949–1950: Harburger TB
- 1950–1952: FC St. Pauli
- 1955–1957: Arminia Hannover
- * Club domestic league appearances and goals

Walter Risse (2 December 1893 – 16 June 1969) was a German footballer who played for Düsseldorfer SC 99 and Hamburger SV and the Germany national team.
