= Gerd Bohnsack =

German footballer and manager

Personal information
- Full name: Gerd Bohnsack
- Date of birth: 15 February 1939 (age 87)
- Place of birth: Hanover, German Reich
- Position: Midfielder

Youth career
- 1949–1960: Hannover 96

Senior career*
Years	Team	Apps	(Gls)
1960–1963	VfV Hildesheim		

Managerial career
- 1968–1974: OSV Hannover
- 1974–1979: SV Arminia Hannover
- 1979–1980: VfL Osnabrück
- 1980–1982: VfB Oldenburg
- 1982: Tennis Borussia Berlin
- 1982–1983: Hannover 96
- 1985–1986: SV Arminia Hannover
- * Club domestic league appearances and goals

Gerd Bohnsack (born 15 February 1939 in Hanover) is a German former football player and manager.

Bohnsack managed SV Arminia Hannover, VfL Osnabrück, VfB Oldenburg, and Hannover 96 in the 2. Bundesliga during the 1970s and 1980s.
