= Hannes Baldauf =

German footballer and coach

Personal information
- Date of birth: 9 March 1938
- Place of birth: Pausa, Germany
- Date of death: 25 February 2015 (aged 76)
- Position: Defender

Senior career*
Years	Team	Apps	(Gls)
1959–1968	Hannover 96 II		
1963–1966	Hannover 96		
	TuS Celle FC	1968–1970	

Managerial career
- 1970–1972: TuS Celle FC
- 1972–1973: Hannover 96 (assistant)
- 1973–1974: Hannover 96
- 1976: Hannover 96
- 1977–1980: SpVgg Fürth
- 1980–1981: SC Herford
- 1981–1984: FC Augsburg
- 1984: SSV Ulm 1846
- 1985–1987: SSV Jahn Regensburg
- 1987–1989: 1. FC Nürnberg II
- 1992–1994: Hannover 96 (assistant)
- 1994–1995: Hannover 96 II
- * Club domestic league appearances and goals

Hannes Baldauf (9 March 1938 – 25 February 2015) was a German football player and coach.

== Career ==
Baldauf was involved with Hannover 96 as both a player and a manager.
