= Theo Schönhöft =

German footballer

Personal information
- Full name: Theo Schönhöft
- Date of birth: 9 May 1932
- Place of birth: Steinfeld, Germany
- Date of death: 26 July 1976 (aged 44)
- Position: Forward

Senior career*
Years	Team	Apps	(Gls)
1952–1962	VfL Osnabrück		

International career
1956	West Germany	1	(1)
- * Club domestic league appearances and goals

Theo Schönhöft (9 May 1932 – 26 July 1976) was a German international footballer who played as a forward for VfL Osnabrück.
