= Reinhold Daschner =

German former footballer

Personal information
- Date of birth: 16 October 1969 (age 57)
- Place of birth: Munich, West Germany
- Height: 1.80 m (5 ft 11 in)
- Positions: Right-back; midfielder

Youth career
- Hertha Munich
- –1987: Bayern Munich

Senior career*
Years	Team	Apps	(Gls)
1987–1990	Bayern Munich (A)		
1987–1990	Bayern Munich	0	(0)
1990–1992	1. FC Köln (A)		
1990–1992	1. FC Köln	6	(0)
1992–1996	Hannover 96	107	(17)
1996–2004	LR Ahlen	181	(4)
- * Club domestic league appearances and goals

Reinhold Daschner (born 16 October 1969) is a German former professional footballer who played as a right-back or midfielder.
