= Rolf Paetz =

German footballer (1922–1994)

Personal information
- Date of birth: 24 November 1922
- Place of birth: Germany
- Date of death: 19 April 1994 (aged 71)
- Position: Forward

Senior career*
| Years | Team | Apps | (Gls) |
| 1951–1952 | SV Erle 08 | | |
| 1952–1958 | Hannover 96 | | |

Managerial career
- 1969: Hannover 96
- * Club domestic league appearances and goals

Rolf Paetz (24 November 1922 – 19 April 1994) was a German footballer who played as a forward for Hannover 96.

== Honours ==
- German football championship: 1954
