= Hannes Kirk =

German footballer (1924–2010)

Personal information
- Full name: Johannes Kirk
- Date of birth: 3 March 1924
- Place of birth: Hebrondamnitz, Germany
- Date of death: 20 November 2010 (aged 86)
- Position: Defender

Senior career*
Years	Team	Apps	(Gls)
1948–1952	Werder Bremen		
1952–1957	Hannover 96		

International career
- Germany

Managerial career
- 1962: Hannover 96
- 1966: Hannover 96
- * Club domestic league appearances and goals

Johannes Kirk (3 March 1924 – 20 November 2010) was a German footballer who played as a defender for Werder Bremen and Hannover 96. He later became Hannover 96's manager in the 1960s. He was also part of the Germany national team's squad for the football tournament at the 1952 Summer Olympics, but he did not play in any matches.
