= Helmut Kronsbein =

German footballer (1914–1991)

Personal information
- Date of birth: 25 December 1914
- Place of birth: Danzig
- Date of death: 27 March 1991 (aged 76)
- Position: Forward

Senior career*
Years	Team	Apps	(Gls)
1938–1943	Arminia Bielefeld		
1943–1944	Hindenburg Allenstein		
1944–1948	SC Preußen Danzig		
1948–1949	1. FC Köln		
1949–1950	TSG Ulm 1846		

Managerial career
- 1949–1952: TSG Ulm 1846
- 1952–1957: Hannover 96
- 1957–1959: Meidericher SV
- 1959–1962: Alemannia Aachen
- 1962–1963: VfR Mannheim
- 1963–1966: Hannover 96
- 1966–1974: Hertha BSC
- 1974–1976: Hannover 96
- 1976–1978: Hannover 96
- 1979–1980: Hertha BSC
- * Club domestic league appearances and goals

Helmut Kronsbein (25 December 1914 – 27 March 1991) was a German football player and manager who played as a forward.
