= Harburger TB =

German association football club from Hamburg, Germany

Harburger TB 1865
- logo
- Full name: Harburger Turnerbund von 1865 e. V.
- Founded: 6 September 1865
- Ground: Sportpark Jahnhöhe
- Chairman: Michael Armbrecht
- Coach: Kirill Schneider
- League: Landesliga Hamburg-Hammonia
- Website: https://www.harburger-turnerbund.de/
| Home colours | Away colours |

Harburger TB 1865 (German: Harburger Turnerbund von 1865 e. V.) is a German sports club in Heimfeld, Hamburg, Germany.

== History ==
Harburg TB was founded on 6 September 1865 through the merger of Harburg Turnerschaft 1858 and Männerturnvereins 1861 Harburg. In 1883, Männer Turnverein 1883 Harburg (MTV 1883) split from the club. FC Schwarz-Weiß 1924 Harburg then split off from Harburg TB as well. In 1907, Harburg TB acquired their field, the Jahnhöhe.

Walter Risse was hired to the manage the club after the 1948–49 season as the team were getting ready to play in the first division for the first time. He helped lead the club to a big win over Itzehoer SV, in front of 20,000 fans. Thanks to a donor, the team was able to improve their facilities and built their first locker room at this time. Harburg's Jahnhöhe field was not suitable for the first division though and the team had to play in Viktoria Harburg's, Stadion Winsener Straße field instead. Harburg's first season in the top division was unsuccessful as the team came in last place and were demoted.

The team lost many players due to its demotion but re-built and headed back to the Oberliga Nord for the 1952–53 season. They had to play at Stadion Winsener Straße again, but were able to avoid demotion and gained some increased fan support. The team was then relegated from the Oberliga Nord in 1954–55, and has not seen first division play since. The team came close in 1956, 1959, 1960 and 1961 but lost in the promotion playoffs.

They won the Amateurliga Hamburg in 1960–61 but had dropped to the 3rd division in 1963–64 due to the creation of the Bundesliga. The team nearly merged with Turnerschaft Harburg to create a team called SC Phoenix von 1865, but the merge was cancelled.

The club was demoted to the 5th division by the 1974–75 season. The football section of the club started receiving less funding and the team could not get past the 4th and 5th divisions. The team withdrew from the Oberliga in 2000 and by 2003, had chosen to compete in the 8th division. The club renovated their facilities in 2008 and renamed their field, the Sportpark Jahnhöhe.

In 2019 the club's facilities were renovated for energy efficiency, adding a solar power system, LED lighting, thermal insulation, rainwater storage tanks, batteries, and geothermal heat pumps. The renovation reduced annual costs for gas from €50,000 to about €12,000 and for electricity from €5,000 to €2,000.

As of 2023, the team competes in the Landesliga Staffel.

== Other information ==
Harburger TB has been featured in the video game series, Football Manager, since 2014.

Harburger are rivals of FTSV Altenwerder and games between the two are known as the "Landesligaderby".

The club also offers other sports such as men's and women's tennis and women's football at various levels. The club hosted the 59th annual Harburg Tennis Championships, featuring over 104 players, in 2021 and had hosted the 2017 championship

In 2020, two of their B-Juniors women's football players, Elanur Turhan and Beyza Kara, were chosen for the Turkish national U-17 soccer team.

Harburg also offers a football team for players with disabilities.

== Season results ==
Season by season Results
| Season | League | Place | League Level |
|---|---|---|---|
| 1912–13 | 3. Klasse Nordhannover Gruppe Harburg | 5 | 3 |
| 1913–14 | 3. Klasse Nordhannover Gruppe Harburg | 2 | 3 |
| 1914–15 | 2. Klasse Nordhannover Gruppe Harburg | 9 | 2 |
| 1915–16 | Season cancelled due to World War I | | |
| 1916–17 | 1. Klasse Nordhannover Gruppe Harburg | 2 | 2 |
| 1917–18 | 1. Klasse Nordhannover Gruppe Harburg | 5 | 2 |
| 1918–19 | 1. Klasse Nordhannover Gruppe Harburg | 4 | 2 |
| 1919–20 | 1. Klasse Nordhannover Gruppe Harburg | 7 | 2 |
| 1920–21 | B-Klasse Nordhannover Gruppe Harburg | 3 | 2 |
| 1921–22 | A-Klasse Nordhannover Gruppe Harburg | 4 | 2 |
| 1922–23 | Norddeutsche Liga Nordhannover | 6 | 1 |
| 1923–24 | Norddeutsche Liga Nordhannover | 4 | 1 |
| 1923–24 | Withdrew from the Norddeutsche Liga Nordhannover after seven games | | 1 |

The club's football and gymnastic teams split in 1923–24. Soccer players from HTB formed MTV Harburg and soccer players who remained with HTB competed as "Schwarz-Weiss Harburg" and also played in the league. After seven games, Schwarz-Weiss Harburg rejoined HTB. HTB then rejoined the Norddeutschen Fubball-Verband and they merged with SV Harburg.

Season by season Results
| Season | League | Place | League Level |
|---|---|---|---|
| 1930–31 | Bezirksliga Nordhannover | 11 | 2 |
| 1931–32 | A-Klasse Kreis Harburg Nordhannover | N/A | 2 |
| 1932–33 | A-Klasse Kreis Harburg Nordhannover | N/A | 2 |
| 1933–34 | 1. Kreisklasse Hamburg Staffel Harburg | N/A | 2 |
| 1933–34 | 1. Kreisklasse Hamburg Staffel Harburg | N/A | 2 |
| 1934–35 | Bezirksliga Harburg-Luneburg Gau Niedersachen | 7 | 2 |
| 1935–36 | Bezirksliga Harburg Gau Niedersachen | N/A | 2 |
| 1936–37 | Bezirksliga Harburg-Luneburg Gau Niedersachen | 7 | 2 |
| 1937–38 | Bezirsklasse Hamburg Hammonia-Staffel | 8 | 2 |
| 1938–39 | Bezirsklasse Hamburg Hammonia-Staffel | 10 | 2 |
| 1939–40 | 2. Klasse Hamburg Staffel F | 4 | 3 |
| 1940–41 | 2. Klasse Hamburg Staffel G | 1 | 3 |
| 1941–42 | 1. Klasse Hamburg Germania-Staffel | 6 | 2 |
| 1942–43 | 1. Klasse Hamburg Hammonia-Staffel | 10 | 2 |
| 1943–44 | 1. Klasse Hamburg Germania-Staffel | 8 | 2 |
| 1944–45 | 1. Klasse Hamburg Germania-Staffel - The season was not completed due to World War II | | 2 |
| 1945–46 | The Leagues were changed after World War II. HTB finished 2nd in qualifying and 9th in 1. Klass Hamburg Elbe-Staffel | 9 | 2 |
| 1946–47 | 1. Klasse Hamburg Elbe-Staffel | 5 | 2 |
| 1947–48 | Verbandsliga Hamburg Elbe-Staffel | 6 | 2 |
| 1948–49 | Verbandsliga Hamburg Elbe-Staffel | 1 | 2 |
| 1949–50 | Oberliga Nord | 16 | 1 |
| 1950–51 | Amateurliga Hamburg | 6 | 2 |
| 1951–52 | Amateurliga Hamburg | 1 | 2 |
| 1952–53 | Oberliga Nord | 14 | 1 |
| 1953–54 | Oberliga Nord | 14 | 1 |
| 1954–55 | Oberliga Nord | 16 | 1 |
| 1955–56 | Amateurliga Hamburg | 2 | 2 |
| 1956–57 | Amateurliga Hamburg | 7 | 2 |
| 1957–58 | Amateurliga Hamburg | 4 | 2 |
| 1958–59 | Amateurliga Hamburg | 2 | 2 |
| 1959–60 | Amateurliga Hamburg | 2 | 2 |
| 1960–61 | Amateurliga Hamburg | 1 | 2 |
| 1961–62 | Amateurliga Hamburg | 11 | 2 |
| 1962–63 | Amateurliga Hamburg | 5 | 2 |
| 1963–64 | Landesliga Hamburg | 6 | 3 |
| 1964–65 | Landesliga Hamburg | 9 | 3 |
| 1965–66 | Landesliga Hamburg | 10 | 3 |
| 1966–67 | Landesliga Hamburg | 5 | 3 |
| 1967–68 | Landesliga Hamburg | 16 | 3 |
| 1968–69 | Verbandsliga Hamburg Hansa-Staffel | 10 | 4 |
| 1969–70 | Verbandsliga Hamburg Hansa-Staffel | 5 | 4 |
| 1970–71 | Amateurliga Hamburg Hansa-Staffel | 12 | 4 |
| 1971–72 | Amateurliga Hamburg Hansa-Staffel | 14 | 4 |
| 1972–73 | Amateurliga Hamburg Hansa-Staffel | 7 | 4 |
| 1973–74 | Amateurliga Hamburg Hansa-Staffel | 3 | 4 |
| 1974–75 | Amateur Hamburg Hansa-Staffel | 4 | 5 |
| 1975–76 | Amateur Hamburg Hammonia-Staffel | 4 | 5 |
| 1976–77 | Amateur Hamburg Hammonia-Staffel | 1 | 5 |
| 1977–78 | Landesliga Hamburg | 14 | 4 |
| 1978–79 | Verbandsliga Hamburg | 10 | 4 |
| 1979–80 | Verbandsliga Hamburg | 16 | 4 |
| 1980–81 | Landesliga Hamburg Hammonia-Staffel | 5 | 5 |
| 1981–82 | Landesliga Hamburg Hammonia-Staffel | 3 | 5 |
| 1982–83 | Landesliga Hamburg Hammonia-Staffel | 2 | 5 |
| 1983–84 | Verbandsliga Hamburg | 16 | 4 |
| 1984–85 | Landesliga Hamburg Hammonia-Staffel | 2 | 5 |
| 1985–86 | Landesliga Hamburg Hammonia-Staffel | 12 | 5 |
| 1986–87 | Landesliga Hamburg Hammonia-Staffel | 10 | 5 |
| 1987–88 | Landesliga Hamburg Hammonia-Staffel | 9 | 5 |
| 1988–89 | Landesliga Hamburg Hammonia-Staffel | 10 | 5 |
| 1989–90 | Landesliga Hamburg Hammonia-Staffel | 8 | 5 |
| 1990–91 | Landesliga Hamburg Hammonia-Staffel | 2 | 5 |
| 1991–92 | Landesliga Hamburg Hammonia-Staffel | 2 | 5 |
| 1992–93 | Landesliga Hamburg Hammonia-Staffel | 2 | 5 |
| 1993–94 | Verbandsliga Hamburg | 7 | 4 |
| 1993–94 | Verbandsliga Hamburg | 6 | 4 |
| 1994–95 | Oberliga HH/SH | 7 | 4 |
| 1995–96 | Oberliga HH/SH | 9 | 4 |
| 1996–97 | Oberliga HH/SH | 11 | 4 |
| 1997–98 | Oberliga HH/SH | 13 | 4 |
| 1998–99 | Oberliga HH/SH | 10 | 4 |
| 1999–2000 | Oberliga HH/SH | 11 | 4 |
| 2000–01 | Withdrew at the middle of the season | N/A | 4 |
| 2001–02 | Verbandsliga Hamburg | 9 | 5 |
| 2002–03 | Verbandsliga Hamburg | 1 | 5 |
| 2003–04 | Kreisliga Staffel 1 | 2 | 8 |
| 2004–05 | Kreisliga Staffel 1 | 2 | 8 |
| 2005–06 | Kreisliga Staffel 1 | 6 | 8 |
| 2006–07 | Kreisliga Staffel 1 | 14 | 8 |
| 2007–08 | Kreisklasse Staffel 3 | 7 | 9 |
| 2008–09 | Kreisklasse Staffel 3 | 2 | 9 |
| 2009–10 | Kreisklasse Staffel 1 | 2 | 8 |

== Managers ==
- 1947–1949 – Artur Koch
- 1949–1950 – Walter Risse
- 1950–1951 – Paul Weber
- 1951–1953 – H. Morgenstern
- 1953–1954 – Artur Koch
- 1954–1955 – Fredo Dorfel
- 1955–1957 – Artur Koch
- 1957–1958 – Herbert Panse
- 1958–1961 – Paul Weber
- 1961–1962 – Erwin Reinhardt
- 1962–1964 – Paul Weber
- 1964–1965 – E. Rohrschneider
- 1968–1970 – Werner Schadly
- 1970–1972 – Karl Gohde
- 1972–1974 – Hans Tietz
- 1974–1976 – Werner Menk
- 1976–1978 – Walter Gulck
- 1978 – Holger Bensow
- 1978–1981 – H. Borstelmann
- 1981–1983 – Horst Willumeit
- 1983 – Klaus Buchholz
- 1983–1986 – Manfred Hoffmann
- 1989–1991 – Hans-W. Schmidt
- 1991–1994 – Uwe Knodel
- 1994–1999 Bert Ehm
- 1999–2000 – Thorsten Bettin
- 2001 – Peter Lemke
- 2001–2003 – Rainer Wasielke
- 2003–2005 – Oliver Balon
- 2005–2007 – P. Rohrschneider
- 2008–2008 – Ahmet Kucukler
- 2008–present – Oliver Balon

== Notable personnel ==
- Walter Risse - He managed the club from 1949 to 50 and played for the Germany national team.
- Rudolf Noack - He played for the club in 1931, when it was SV Harburg. He later represented Germany in the 1934 FIFA World Cup.
- Igor Matanović - He played for Harburger prior to 2010 and played Germany youth national team.
- Reagy Ofosu - He played for the club as a youth player from 1999 to 2005.
- Edmund Adamkiewicz - He played for the club from 1953 to 1955 and played for the Germany national team.
- Jens Paeslack - He played for the club from 1995 to 1996 and later played for Karlsruher SC.
- Jurgen Neudorf - He played for the club from 1959 to 1961 and appeared for the Germany youth national team.
- Paul Weber - He played for the club's 1948–49 Oberliga promotion team and continued to play with the club until the age of 40. He later coached the youth and men's teams, winning the amateur league and the DFB Landerpokal.
- Hans Franke - He played for FC St. Pauli and 1. FC Kaiserslautern then later was the captain of HTB. He held the record for the most games played and the most goals scored at HTB and played an important role in HTB's 1949 and 1952 championships.
- Heinrich Nodof - He played for the 1941 and 1949 championship teams, then later became a trainer and a groundskeeper for the club.
- Otmar Sommerfeld - He was part of the 1948–49 championship team and made 362 appearances in the Oberliga Nord, which was a record. He later played for FC St. Pauli.
- Horst Willumeit - He was a goalkeeper and helped the team win the 1960–61 Amateurliga Hamburg and the 1981 Harburg-Pokal. He also helped Hamburg win the 1961 Länderpokal.
- Horst Michalke - He was part of the 1960–61 Amateurliga Hamburg championship team and later as a trainer helped the team win the 1981 Harburg-Pokal.
- Werner Menk - He helped the team win the 1961 title then helped the city of Hamburg win the 1961 Länderpokal. He later played on the 1976 Harburg-Pokal championship team.
- Udo Padikow - He helped HTB reach the 1960 Hamburg Cup finals and helped North Germany win the 1961 DFB-Jugend-Länderpokal. He played more than 500 games with HTB and was the captain from 1968 to 1973.
- Ulrich Fastert - He was part of the Hamburg amateur team and helped HTB win the 1976 Harburg-Pokal and the 1976–77 Amateur Hamburg Hammonia-Staffel.
- Uwe Ozekker - He helped the team win the 1976, 1981 and 1983 Harburg-Pokal's along with the 1977 Amateur Hamburg Hammonia-Staffel.

== Honors ==
- 3. Klasse Nordhannover Gruppe Harburg
  - Champions: none
  - Runners-up: 1913–14
- 1. Klasse Nordhannover Gruppe Harburg
  - Champions: none
  - Runners-up: 1916–17
- 2. Klasse Hamburg Staffel G
  - Champions: 1940–41
  - Runners-up: none
- Verbandsliga Hamburg Elbe-Staffel
  - Champions: 1948–49
  - Runners-up: none
- Amateurliga Hamburg
  - Champions: 1951–52, 1960–61
  - Runners-up: 1955–56, 1958–59, 1959–60
- Amateur Hamburg Hammonia-Staffel
  - Champions: 1976–77
  - Runners-up: none
- Landesliga Hamburg Hammonia-Staffel
  - Champions: none
  - Runners-up: 1982–83, 1984–85, 1990–91, 1991–92, 1992–93
- Verbandsliga Hamburg
  - Champions: 2002–03
  - Runners-up: none
- Kreisliga Staffel 1
  - Champions: none
  - Runners-up: 2003–04, 2004–05, 2009–2010
- Kreisliga Staffel 3
  - Champions: none
  - Runners-up: 2008–09
