= 1986–87 2. Bundesliga =

13th season of the second-tier football league in Germany

2. Bundesliga
- Season: 1986–87
- Champions: Hannover 96
- Promoted: Hannover 96; Karlsruher SC
- Relegated: Eintracht Braunschweig; Viktoria Aschaffenburg; Hessen Kassel; FSV Salmrohr
- Matches: 380
- Top goalscorer: Siegfried Reich (26 goals)
- Average attendance: 5,777

The 1986–87 2. Bundesliga season was the thirteenth season of the 2. Bundesliga, the second tier of the German football league system.

Hannover 96 and Karlsruher SC were promoted to the Bundesliga while Eintracht Braunschweig, Viktoria Aschaffenburg, KSV Hessen Kassel and FSV Salmrohr were relegated to the Oberliga.

== League table ==
For the 1986–87 season SSV Ulm 1846, FSV Salmrohr, FC St. Pauli and Rot-Weiss Essen were newly promoted to the 2. Bundesliga from the Oberliga while 1. FC Saarbrücken and Hannover 96 had been relegated to the league from the Bundesliga.

Locations of the participating teams of the 1986–87 season

| Pos | Team | Pld | W | D | L | GF | GA | GD | Pts | Promotion, qualification or relegation |
|---|---|---|---|---|---|---|---|---|---|---|
| 1 | Hannover 96 (C, P) | 38 | 23 | 10 | 5 | 86 | 48 | +38 | 56 | Promotion to Bundesliga |
| 2 | Karlsruher SC (P) | 38 | 22 | 8 | 8 | 79 | 49 | +30 | 52 | Promotion to Bundesliga |
| 3 | FC St. Pauli | 38 | 19 | 11 | 8 | 63 | 45 | +18 | 49 | Qualification to promotion play-offs |
| 4 | Darmstadt 98 | 38 | 20 | 7 | 11 | 72 | 48 | +24 | 47 | |
| 5 | Alemannia Aachen | 38 | 18 | 10 | 10 | 55 | 36 | +19 | 46 | |
| 6 | VfL Osnabrück | 38 | 18 | 8 | 12 | 69 | 66 | +3 | 44 | |
| 7 | Stuttgarter Kickers | 38 | 18 | 6 | 14 | 72 | 55 | +17 | 42 | |
| 8 | SC Freiburg | 38 | 13 | 13 | 12 | 59 | 56 | +3 | 39 | |
| 9 | Arminia Bielefeld | 38 | 12 | 14 | 12 | 58 | 55 | +3 | 38 | |
| 10 | Rot-Weiss Essen | 38 | 14 | 10 | 14 | 70 | 69 | +1 | 38 | |
| 11 | SG Wattenscheid 09 | 38 | 12 | 14 | 12 | 59 | 66 | −7 | 38 | |
| 12 | SG Union Solingen | 38 | 13 | 9 | 16 | 61 | 65 | −4 | 35 | |
| 13 | SSV Ulm 1846 | 38 | 13 | 9 | 16 | 55 | 63 | −8 | 35 | |
| 14 | Fortuna Köln | 38 | 10 | 15 | 13 | 51 | 66 | −15 | 35 | |
| 15 | 1. FC Saarbrücken | 38 | 10 | 14 | 14 | 53 | 71 | −18 | 34 | |
| 16 | Rot-Weiß Oberhausen | 38 | 13 | 7 | 18 | 52 | 55 | −3 | 33 | |
| 17 | Eintracht Braunschweig (R) | 38 | 11 | 10 | 17 | 52 | 47 | +5 | 32 | Relegation to Oberliga |
| 18 | Viktoria Aschaffenburg (R) | 38 | 5 | 14 | 19 | 47 | 72 | −25 | 24 | Relegation to Oberliga |
| 19 | KSV Hessen Kassel (R) | 38 | 6 | 10 | 22 | 40 | 75 | −35 | 22 | Relegation to Oberliga |
| 20 | FSV Salmrohr (R) | 38 | 4 | 13 | 21 | 48 | 94 | −46 | 21 | Relegation to Oberliga |

Source: Bundesliga.de
Rules for classification: 1) points; 2) goal difference; 3) number of goals scored.
(C) Champions; (P) Promoted; (R) Relegated

== Results ==
| Home \ Away | AAC | SVV | DSC | EBS | D98 | RWE | SCF | H96 | KSC | KAS | FKO | RWO | OSN | FCS | SAL | SGU | STP | SKI | ULM | SGW |
|---|---|---|---|---|---|---|---|---|---|---|---|---|---|---|---|---|---|---|---|---|
| Alemannia Aachen | — | 4–1 | 2–0 | 1–0 | 1–0 | 0–0 | 1–1 | 3–2 | 4–0 | 2–1 | 0–1 | 2–1 | 1–0 | 0–0 | 1–0 | 2–1 | 1–1 | 4–1 | 2–1 | 0–1 |
| Viktoria Aschaffenburg | 1–2 | — | 1–2 | 3–1 | 0–0 | 2–2 | 1–4 | 1–1 | 2–1 | 0–0 | 1–1 | 1–2 | 1–1 | 6–0 | 2–2 | 2–1 | 1–2 | 2–4 | 0–0 | 1–2 |
| Arminia Bielefeld | 1–5 | 1–1 | — | 3–1 | 1–0 | 1–1 | 0–0 | 1–2 | 1–1 | 1–0 | 3–3 | 4–1 | 2–3 | 1–3 | 4–0 | 1–1 | 1–1 | 1–1 | 5–1 | 2–3 |
| Eintracht Braunschweig | 1–2 | 3–0 | 2–3 | — | 0–0 | 2–0 | 2–0 | 0–0 | 1–1 | 3–0 | 2–0 | 2–1 | 3–2 | 0–0 | 3–0 | 5–1 | 1–2 | 5–2 | 2–2 | 3–1 |
| Darmstadt 98 | 2–2 | 1–0 | 1–1 | 2–1 | — | 4–0 | 1–0 | 3–1 | 1–4 | 3–0 | 2–1 | 2–2 | 7–1 | 4–2 | 8–0 | 1–0 | 4–2 | 1–0 | 2–1 | 1–1 |
| Rot-Weiss Essen | 0–1 | 5–1 | 2–0 | 1–1 | 1–4 | — | 3–0 | 3–4 | 2–1 | 4–1 | 3–3 | 3–1 | 3–5 | 4–0 | 3–2 | 2–0 | 4–0 | 2–1 | 2–3 | 3–1 |
| SC Freiburg | 2–1 | 3–1 | 0–0 | 2–2 | 3–1 | 3–1 | — | 3–2 | 1–2 | 1–2 | 1–1 | 2–1 | 2–2 | 1–1 | 2–1 | 2–2 | 1–0 | 2–0 | 3–1 | 5–1 |
| Hannover 96 | 1–0 | 3–1 | 4–1 | 1–0 | 3–2 | 3–2 | 1–1 | — | 8–0 | 0–0 | 2–0 | 1–0 | 0–0 | 1–1 | 3–1 | 2–0 | 4–1 | 4–1 | 2–1 | 2–4 |
| Karlsruher SC | 2–2 | 3–1 | 2–0 | 2–1 | 4–0 | 3–0 | 4–2 | 3–2 | — | 2–1 | 1–0 | 3–2 | 1–2 | 6–0 | 1–0 | 4–1 | 1–1 | 2–1 | 5–0 | 1–1 |
| Hessen Kassel | 1–1 | 1–4 | 4–5 | 1–0 | 1–1 | 2–2 | 4–2 | 0–4 | 0–4 | — | 1–0 | 0–2 | 0–0 | 0–1 | 0–0 | 0–1 | 1–3 | 0–1 | 1–4 | 2–3 |
| Fortuna Köln | 1–0 | 1–1 | 0–0 | 1–0 | 0–1 | 2–2 | 1–1 | 1–1 | 3–3 | 2–2 | — | 0–0 | 2–1 | 3–2 | 4–2 | 2–1 | 2–2 | 1–6 | 3–1 | 1–1 |
| Rot-Weiß Oberhausen | 1–0 | 0–0 | 0–0 | 1–0 | 0–1 | 2–0 | 2–0 | 1–2 | 1–3 | 0–1 | 2–0 | — | 0–2 | 1–0 | 6–1 | 0–0 | 0–1 | 3–0 | 1–1 | 3–0 |
| VfL Osnabrück | 0–2 | 3–1 | 1–5 | 3–1 | 3–0 | 2–2 | 1–1 | 1–2 | 1–0 | 3–1 | 3–0 | 2–1 | — | 1–1 | 5–0 | 6–3 | 1–3 | 3–2 | 3–0 | 1–1 |
| 1. FC Saarbrücken | 2–1 | 4–2 | 0–2 | 0–0 | 0–5 | 5–1 | 2–2 | 1–2 | 1–2 | 2–1 | 3–3 | 1–1 | 4–1 | — | 0–2 | 1–1 | 0–0 | 2–0 | 2–0 | 4–1 |
| FSV Salmrohr | 1–1 | 1–1 | 1–1 | 0–0 | 0–4 | 2–2 | 1–2 | 5–5 | 1–1 | 0–5 | 4–0 | 2–4 | 2–3 | 3–3 | — | 2–0 | 1–2 | 2–2 | 2–1 | 2–2 |
| Union Solingen | 2–1 | 4–1 | 2–1 | 1–1 | 4–2 | 1–2 | 1–0 | 2–4 | 1–1 | 3–0 | 3–0 | 5–3 | 0–1 | 2–0 | 2–2 | — | 3–2 | 2–1 | 6–2 | 1–1 |
| FC St. Pauli | 0–0 | 2–2 | 2–0 | 1–0 | 3–0 | 1–1 | 2–1 | 3–4 | 2–0 | 4–2 | 3–2 | 5–1 | 0–1 | 4–2 | 3–0 | 1–0 | — | 0–0 | 0–0 | 1–1 |
| Stuttgarter Kickers | 3–2 | 1–1 | 1–0 | 2–1 | 0–1 | 3–0 | 3–0 | 0–0 | 2–0 | 5–2 | 3–1 | 1–0 | 4–0 | 4–0 | 2–1 | 3–1 | 1–2 | — | 3–1 | 4–1 |
| SSV Ulm | 2–0 | 2–0 | 1–2 | 4–2 | 2–0 | 0–1 | 0–0 | 1–1 | 0–2 | 1–1 | 1–3 | 5–2 | 3–1 | 1–1 | 3–0 | 3–1 | 1–0 | 2–1 | — | 3–1 |
| SG Wattenscheid | 1–1 | 2–0 | 1–1 | 1–0 | 3–0 | 2–1 | 4–3 | 0–2 | 0–3 | 1–1 | 1–2 | 2–3 | 5–0 | 2–2 | 3–2 | 1–1 | 0–1 | 3–3 | 0–0 | — |

Source: DFB
Legend: Blue = home team win; Yellow = draw; Red = away team win.

== Top scorers ==
The league's top scorers:

| Goals | Player | Team |
|---|---|---|
| 26 | (Germany) Siegfried Reich | Hannover 96 |
| 20 | (Germany) Paul Linz | VfL Osnabrück |
| 18 | (Germany) Bruno Labbadia | SV Darmstadt 98 |
| 18 | (Germany) Rainer Schütterle | Karlsruher SC |
| 17 | (Germany) Theo Gries | Alemannia Aachen |
| 17 | (Germany) Dirk Heitkamp | Rot-Weiss Essen |
| 17 | (Germany) Joachim Löw | SC Freiburg |
| 17 | (Senegal) Souleyman Sané | SC Freiburg |
| 16 | (Germany) Dirk Kurtenbach | Stuttgarter Kickers |
| 16 | (Germany) Uwe Tschiskale | SG Wattenscheid 09 |
