= Werner Kohlmeyer =

German footballer (1924–1974)

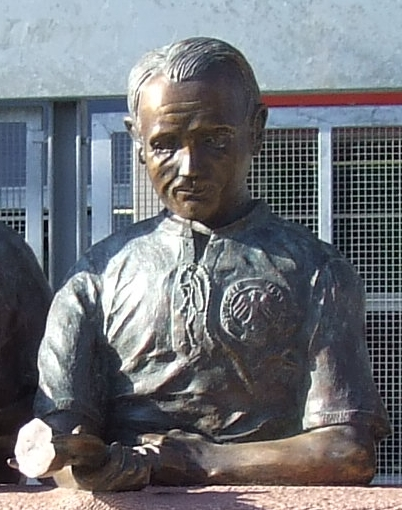
- Sculpture of Kohlmeyer in Kaiserslautern

Personal information
- Date of birth: 19 April 1924
- Place of birth: Kaiserslautern, Germany
- Date of death: 26 March 1974 (aged 49)
- Place of death: Mainz-Mombach, West Germany
- Height: 1.74 m (5 ft 9 in)
- Position: Full back

Senior career*
Years	Team	Apps	(Gls)
1941–1957	1. FC Kaiserslautern	341	(17)
1957–1959	FC Homburg		
1959–1960	SV Bexbach		

International career
1951–1955	West Germany	22	(0)
Medal record
Men's football
Representing West Germany
FIFA World Cup
Winner	1954 Switzerland
- * Club domestic league appearances and goals

Werner Kohlmeyer (19 April 1924 – 26 March 1974) was a German footballer who played as a full back.

He was part of the West German team that won the 1954 FIFA World Cup. In total he earned 22 caps for West Germany. He also played for 1. FC Kaiserslautern from 1941 to 1957.

== Career ==
Kohlmeyer was born in Kaiserslautern.

The burly Kohlmeyer became renowned for saves on the goalline, especially in the game against Yugoslavia during the 1954 World Cup, in which he several times none to soon threw himself into shots on the German goal. In the 1954 FIFA World Cup Final, Kohlmeyer stopped Zoltán Czibor.

Kohlmeyer won the German football championship with 1. FC Kaiserslautern in 1951 and 1953. In one of his last games for Germany, Kohlmeyer faced Stanley Matthews at Wembley on 1 December 1954, in an international friendly between England and West Germany. While he proved incapable of stopping Matthews and clearly lost that duel, Kohlmeyer was proud that he never lost his composure by committing not a single foul on Matthews. It was this attitude of fairness which Germany coach Sepp Herberger appreciated, as well as Kohlmeyer's assuredness and defensive reliability.

Kohlmeyer remained a starter for Kaiserslautern until 1957. After retirement he suffered from a divorce and the detachment from his three children as well as alcoholism and poverty; he lived on welfare for a while, before taking a job as a doorman for a newspaper publisher in Mainz. He died at the age of 49 due to heart failure in Mainz-Mombach.
