= Richard Schneider =

German football manager (1919–1982)

Personal information
- Date of birth: 16 December 1919
- Place of birth: Kaiserslautern, Germany
- Date of death: 28 April 1982 (aged 62)

Managerial career
- Years: Team
- 1950–1961: 1. FC Kaiserslautern
- 1961–1966: Preußen Münster
- 1966–1969: SSV Reutlingen
- 1969: Preußen Münster

Richard Schneider (16 December 1919 – 28 April 1982) was a German football manager. He was in charge of 1. FC Kaiserslautern during the 1950s, winning two German football championships with the club, and appearing in two further finals as runners-up.

Schneider left Kaiserslautern in 1961 and became the manager at Preußen Münster. He managed the club during the inaugural 1963–64 Bundesliga season, but could not prevent the club from being relegated to the Regionalliga divisions. He went on to manage SSV Reutlingen before briefly returning to Preußen Münster for a second spell.

== Honours ==
1. FC Kaiserslautern

- German football championship: 1951, 1953

== Literature ==
- Günter Rohrbacher-List: 1. FC Kaiserslautern. Der Berg, das Land und der Ball. Verlag Die Werkstatt, Göttingen 1995, ISBN 3-89533-125-2. (german)
- Jürgen Bitter: Die Meistermacher. wero press, Pfaffenweiler 2004, ISBN 3-937588-02-7. (german)
