= Hannover 96 =

German professional football club

- Full name: Hannoverscher Sportverein von 1896 e.V.
- Nickname: Die Roten (The Reds)
- Short name: 96
- Founded: 12 April 1896; 130 years ago
- Ground: Heinz von Heiden Arena
- Capacity: 49,000
- President: Sebastian Kramer
- Head coach: Sandro Wagner
- League: 2. Bundesliga
- 2025–26: 2. Bundesliga, 4th of 18
- Website: hannover96.de
Home colours	Away colours	Third colours

Hannoverscher Sportverein von 1896, commonly referred to as Hannover 96 (IPA: [haˈnoːfɐ ˌzɛksʔʊntˈnɔʏntsɪç]), is a German professional sports club based in Hanover, the capital of Lower Saxony. Its senior men's football team competes in the 2. Bundesliga, the second tier of German football, after spending 30 seasons in the top-flight Bundesliga between 1964 and 2019. Founded on 12 April 1896, the multi-sport association has more than 22,000 members, making it the largest in Lower Saxony.

Hannover 96 have won the German football championship twice (1938 and 1954) and lifted the DFB-Pokal in 1992, becoming the first second-division side to do so. The club also hold three 2. Bundesliga titles and have once reached the quarter-finals of European competition, in the 2011–12 UEFA Europa League.

Since 1959 Hannover have played at the 49,000-capacity Niedersachsenstadion, a venue for the 1974 and 2006 FIFA World Cups and UEFA Euro 1988. The club enjoys strong local support and contests the fiercely disputed Lower Saxony derby with regional rivals Eintracht Braunschweig.

== History ==
=== Foundation to the Second World War ===
The club was founded on 12 April 1896 as Hannoverscher Fußball-Club 1896, upon the suggestion of Ferdinand-Wilhelm Fricke, founder of the Deutscher FV 1878 Hannover. Their initial enthusiasm was for athletics and rugby; football did not become their primary interest until 1899. Most of the membership of Germania 1902 Hannover became part of 96 in 1902, while others of the club formed Hannoverscher Ballspielverein. In 1913, they merged with Ballverein 1898 Hannovera (formed in the 1905 merger of Fußballverein Hannovera, 1898 Hannover, and Hannoverscher BV) to become Hannoverscher Sportverein 1896. Hannoverscher FC's colours were black-white-green, but they played in blue, while BV played in red. The newly united team kept black-white-green as the club colours, but they chose to take to the field in red, giving the team the nickname Die Roten ("The Reds"). The team's third jersey is in the club's official colours. The club made regular appearances in the national playoffs through the early 1900s, but was unable to progress past Eintracht Braunschweig, planting the seeds of a rivalry that has survived to this day. HSV continued to field strong sides and make national level appearances on into the 1920s. During Nazi rule, German football was re-organized into 16 top-flight leagues in 1933 and Hannover became part of the Gauliga Niedersachsen. They appeared in the country's final rounds in 1935 and sent representatives to the national side the next year. They won their first national championship in 1938, in what was one of the biggest upsets in German football history, when they beat Schalke 04, the most dominant side in the country in the era. The two sides played to a 3–3 draw before Hannover prevailed 4–3 in a tension-filled re-match. In 1942, the team moved to the newly formed Gauliga Braunschweig-Südhannover.

=== Post-War era ===
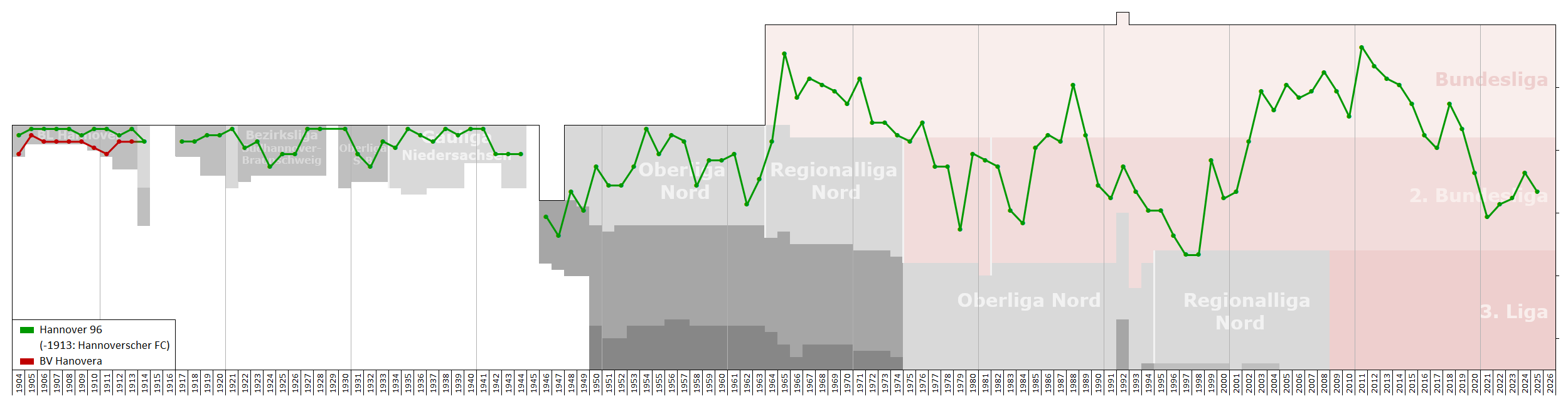
Historical chart of Hannover 96 league performance

In common with most other German organizations, the club was dissolved after the Second World War by occupying Allied authorities. A combined local side was assembled in August 1945 and the next month a mixed group of players from Hannover 96 and Arminia Hannover played their first post-war match against a British military team. HSV was later formally re-established as Hannoverscher SV on 11 November 1945, before re-adopting its traditional name on 27 April 1946. The club resumed league play in 1947 in the first division Oberliga Nord and was relegated, but quickly returned to the top-flight in 1949. Hannover 96's next appearance in a national final would not come until 1954 when they soundly defeated 1. FC Kaiserslautern 5–1. The beaten side included five of the same players who would go on later that year to win Germany's first World Cup in a surprise victory known as the Miracle of Bern. In 1963, the Bundesliga, Germany's new professional football league, began play with 16 of the nation's top teams. Hannover played in the Regionalliga Nord (II) that season, but earned promotion to the senior circuit in the following year. The club's advance to the Bundesliga in 1964 was well received, as they set a league attendance record in their first year, averaging 46,000 spectators a game. 96 played at the upper level for a decade, until they were relegated to the 2nd Bundesliga Nord for the 1974–75 season. They returned quickly, but again went down, this time to spend 17 of the next 20 years in the second tier.

=== Reunification to present ===
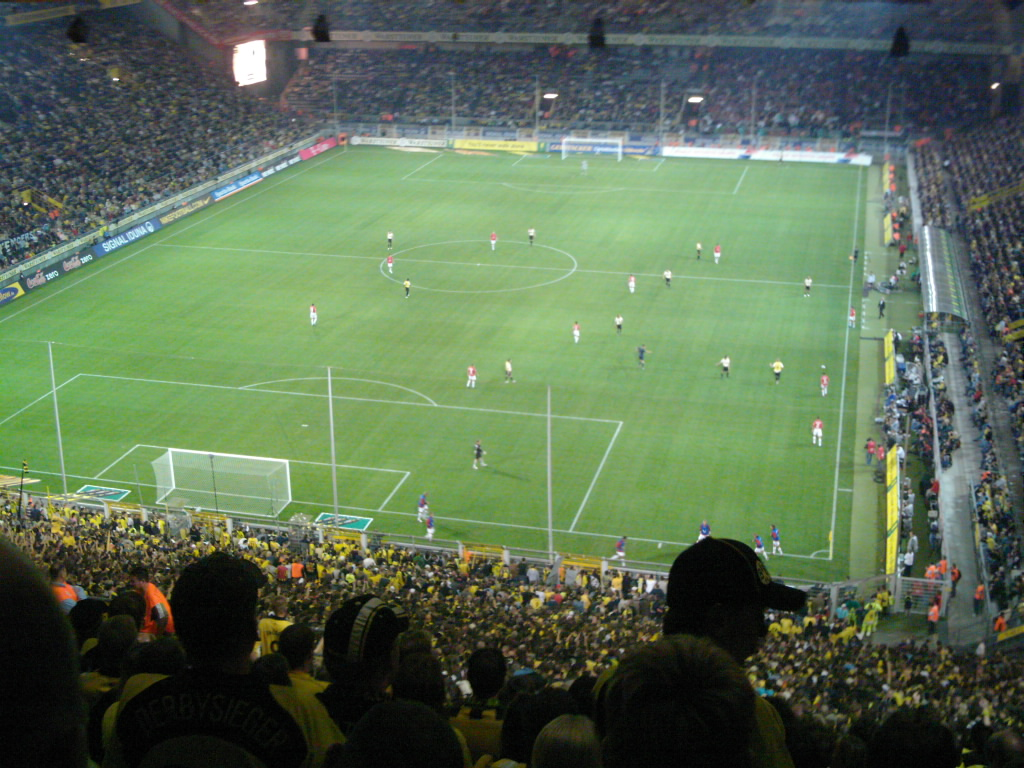
Hannover 96 against Borussia Dortmund in September 2006

The club faced financial problems in the late 1970s and again in the early 1990s. Then, in 1992, Hannover's performance would lead them to earn their first DFB-Pokal and help to secure stable finances. That run included victories over Bundesliga sides Borussia Dortmund, VfL Bochum, Karlsruher SC, Werder Bremen and Borussia Mönchengladbach, as they became the first lower division side to win the competition. The team's low point came with demotion to Regionalliga Nord (III) for two years in 1996–98.

Hannover went on to acquire new players, many of whom went on to play for the national team – notably Gerald Asamoah, Sebastian Kehl and Fabian Ernst. 96 returned to tier II play in 1998, and to the Bundesliga in 2002 on the strength of a record-setting 75-point season. Since their promotion, the club have consolidated in the top flight, consistently earning mid-table finishes under several managers. Coach Dieter Hecking was brought in just weeks into the 2006–07 season after a poor start under Peter Neururer, in which the club lost the first three matches by a combined 11 goals. The 2007–08 season showed some early promise, with pre-season wins over Rangers and Real Madrid. However, they earned mixed results in their opening six Bundesliga matches. The team then put together a three match winning run, capped by a 2–0 win at champions VfB Stuttgart, to enter into the top six. Following the winter break, Hannover after some poor performances, which they turned around to be defeated only two times in their last 11 matches of the season. This secured a points record of 49 for Die Roten in the Bundesliga, thus ending them in eighth place.

The 2008–09 season started poorly for Hannover with losses. However, performance improved with a 5–1 victory of Borussia Mönchengladbach, a 1–0 win over Bayern Munich at home, which had not occurred for 20 years, and a 3–0 victory over Hamburger SV. Hannover settled in the lower-mid-table until the winter break. The second half of the season consisted of inconsistent results, relying almost entirely on home form to keep the club in the Bundesliga. The club finally achieved an away win with a few games remaining which stabilized them, leading to an 11th-place finish.

The 2009–10 season was launched, with a new kit being released which included traditional away and alternative kits. Hannover also signed a new technical director in Jörg Schmadtke. New signings were Karim Haggui and Constant Djakpa from Bayer Leverkusen, Valdet Rama from FC Ingolstadt. The season started with a late 1–0 loss to Hertha BSC and a home draw to Mainz 05, after which coach Dieter Hecking resigned voluntarily. He was succeeded by former assistant Andreas Bergmann. As the season continued, Hannover again had many key players injured, including the majority of attacking players and key defenders, alongside the suicide of Robert Enke, Hannover's German international goalkeeper. Andreas Bergmann was removed as coach and replaced by Mirko Slomka shortly after the winter break. Arouna Koné and Elson were signed to boost the squad. Hannover 96 spent the majority of the year in the relegation zone, and with a few wins in the last games of the season, Hannover had to win, and have results elsewhere be favorable to them. Hannover won 3–0, with Arnold Bruggink, Mike Hanke and Sérgio Pinto all scoring to keep them in the Bundesliga.

In the 2010–11 season, Hannover finished in fourth place, qualifying for Europe for the first time in 19 years. In 2011–12, the team opened with a 2–1 win over 1899 Hoffenheim, followed by a 2–1 away win against 1. FC Nürnberg. In the play-offs to the Europa League, Hannover won against Sevilla 3–2 on aggregate to reach the group stage. Shortly before the end of the 2011–12 season, Hannover Technical Director Jörg Schmadtke resigned due to family issues.

Hannover finished bottom of the Bundesliga in the 2015–16 season and were relegated to the 2. Bundesliga. The club chose to keep the majority of their first-team squad together. However, after early in the 2016–17 season, poor performances prompted the club's board to sack manager Daniel Stendel, and appoint Andre Breitenreiter as their new manager. He led the team to seven wins in the final 11 games, helping the club secure second place behind VfB Stuttgart and return to the top flight.

== Crest ==
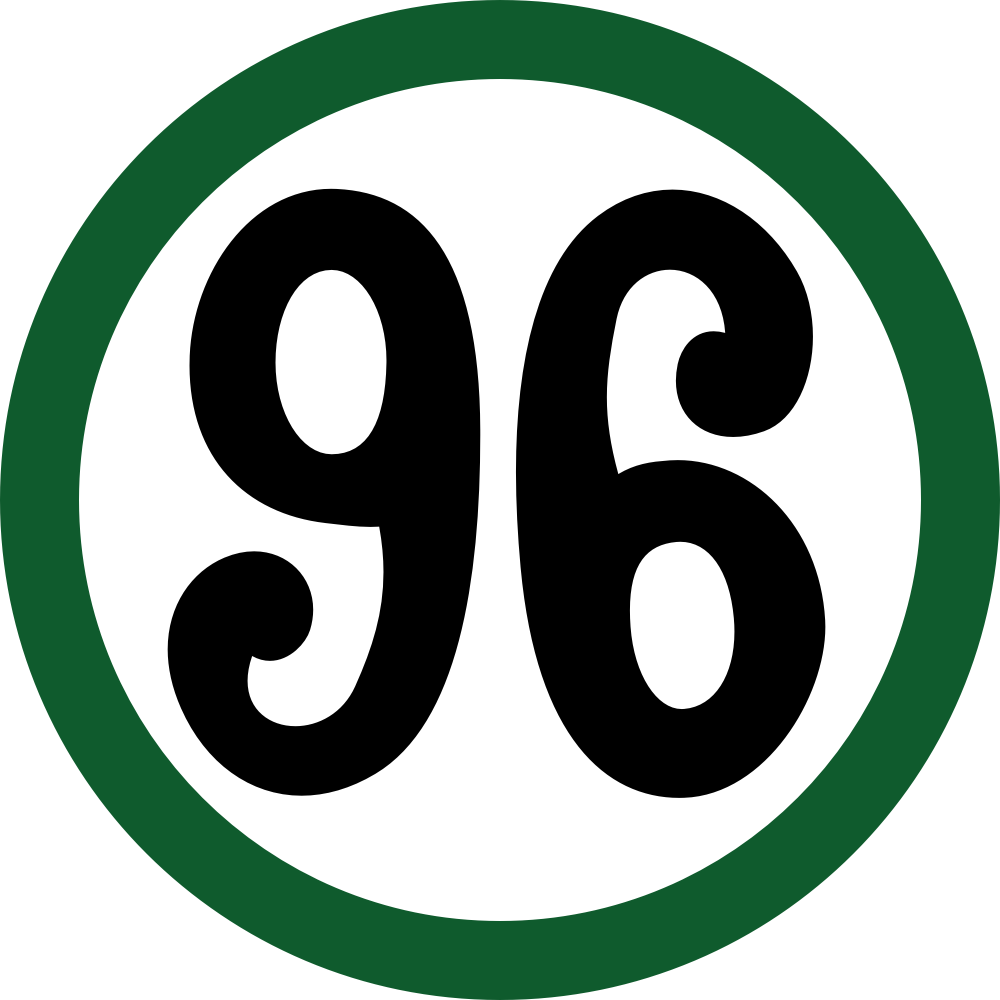
1962–1974

1974–1987

1987–2005

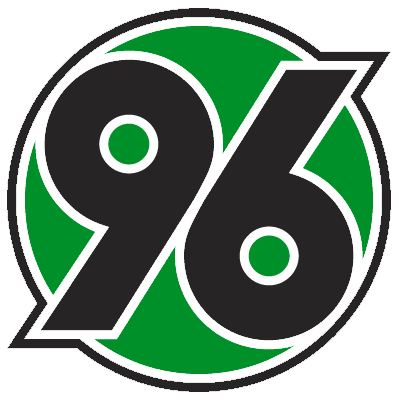
2005–2007

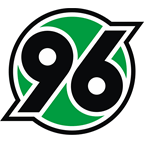
2007–Present

== Death of Robert Enke ==
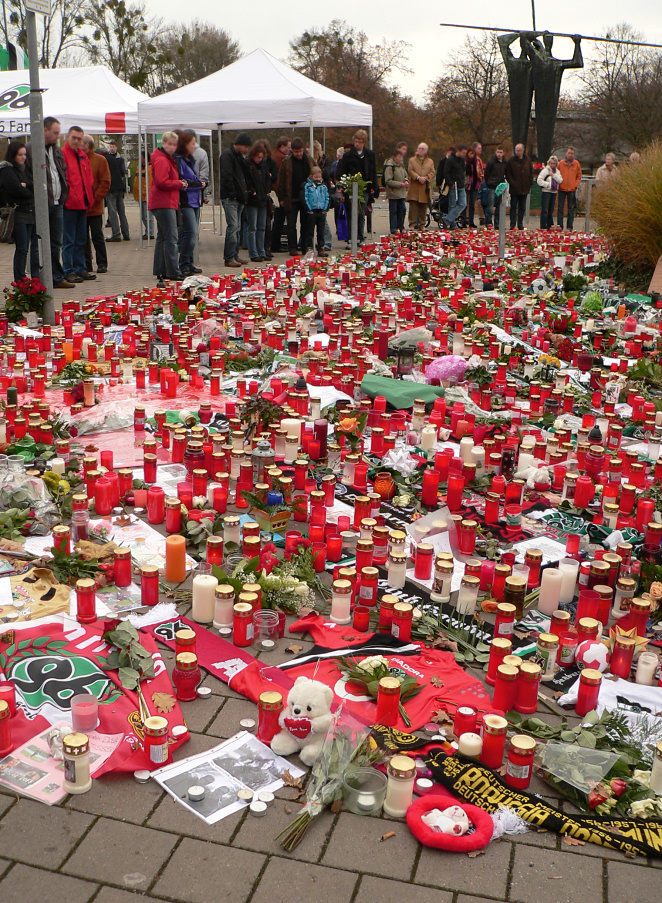
Tributes at AWD-Arena in Hannover

On 10 November 2009, at the age of 32, Hannover's first-choice goalkeeper Robert Enke died as a result of suicide after he stood in front of a regional express train at a level crossing in Eilvese, Neustadt am Rübenberge. Police confirmed a suicide note had been found, but did not publicise its details. His widow, Teresa, revealed that her husband had been suffering from depression for six years and was treated by a psychiatrist. After the death of his daughter Lara in 2006, he struggled to cope with the loss.

Upon news breaking of what had happened, many fans immediately gathered at Hannover 96's AWD-Arena home, where they laid flowers, lit candles and signed a book of condolence. His former club Barcelona held a minute's silence before their game that night, and several international matches the following weekend paid the same tribute. As a mark of respect, the German national team cancelled their friendly match against Chile, which had been scheduled for 14 November. A minute's silence was also held at all Bundesliga games on 21 and 22 November 2009, as well as at Benfica's game in the Taça de Portugal – Benfica was another former club of Enke's. Germany also cancelled a planned training session and all interviews after his death. Oliver Bierhoff, the national team's general manager, said, "We are all shocked. We are lost for words."

On 15 November 2009, nearly 40,000 attendees filled the AWD-Arena for his memorial service. Enke's coffin, covered in white roses, was carried by six of his Hannover 96 teammates. He was then buried in Neustadt, outside the city of Hanover, next to his daughter's grave. As a further mark of respect for their former teammate, Hannover 96 players displayed the number one in a circle on the breast of their jerseys, as approved by the German Football Association (DFL), as a subtle tribute for the rest of the 2009–10 season.

== Stadium ==
Hannover 96 plays in the Heinz-von-Heiden-Arena, built in 1954 as the "Niedersachsenstadion", which 2025 has a capacity of 49,000 spectators. Before the year 2013, the arena was called "AWD-Arena". But after changing the sponsor the stadium name was changed to "HDI-Arena". During the 2006 World Cup, the stadium was the site of four first round matches and one Round of 16 match. The stadium had also served as a site for matches in the 1974 World Cup and UEFA Euro 1988.

== European Cups history ==
Season	Round	Club	Home	Away	Aggregate
1992–93 European Cup Winners' Cup	R1	(Germany) Werder Bremen	2–1	1–3	3–4
2011–12 UEFA Europa League	Play-off	(Spain) Sevilla	2–1	1–1	3–2
2011–12 UEFA Europa League	Group B	(Belgium) Standard Liège	0–0	0–2	2nd
2011–12 UEFA Europa League	Group B	(Denmark) Copenhagen	2–2	2–1	2nd
2011–12 UEFA Europa League	Group B	(Ukraine) Vorskla Poltava	3–1	2–1	2nd
2011–12 UEFA Europa League	Round of 32	(Belgium) Club Brugge	2–1	1–0	3–1
2011–12 UEFA Europa League	Round of 16	(Belgium) Standard Liège	4–0	2–2	6–2
2011–12 UEFA Europa League	Quarter-finals	(Spain) Atlético Madrid	1–2	1–2	2–4
2012–13 UEFA Europa League	Q3	(Republic of Ireland) St Patrick's Athletic	2–0	3–0	5–0
2012–13 UEFA Europa League	Play-off	(Poland) Śląsk Wrocław	5–1	5–3	10–4
2012–13 UEFA Europa League	Group L	(Netherlands) Twente	0–0	2–2	1st
2012–13 UEFA Europa League	Group L	(Spain) Levante	2–1	2–2	1st
2012–13 UEFA Europa League	Group L	(Sweden) Helsingborg	3–2	2–1	1st
2012–13 UEFA Europa League	Round of 32	(Russia) Anzhi Makhachkala	1–1	1–3	2–4

== Honours ==
The club's honours:

- German Championship
  - Champions: 1938, 1954
- DFB-Pokal
  - Winners: 1991–92
- 2. Bundesliga
  - Champions: 1975, 1986–87, 2001–02

=== Regional ===
- Südkreisliga
  - Champions: 1921, 1927, 1928, 1930
- Gauliga Niedersachsen
  - Champions: 1935, 1938
- Oberliga Nord
  - Champions: 1954
- Regionalliga Nord (Tier 3)
  - Champions: 1997, 1998
- Lower Saxony Cup (Tiers 3–5)
  - Winners: 1982,1998, 1999

=== Youth ===
- German Under 17 Championship
  - Runners-up: 1994, 1995
- Under 19 Bundesliga North/Northeast
  - Champions: 2004

== Records ==
- Miscellaneous Records

== Players ==
=== Current squad ===
As of 25 October 2026

Note: Flags indicate national team as defined under FIFA eligibility rules; some limited exceptions apply. Players may hold more than one non-FIFA nationality.

No.	Pos.	Nation	Player
1	GK	SUI	Pascal Loretz
3	DF	GER	Boris Tomiak
4	DF	FRA	Jean Hugonet (vice-captain)
5	DF	ROU	Virgil Ghiță
7	FW	SLE	Mustapha Bundu
8	MF	FRA	Waniss Taïbi
9	FW	FIN	Benjamin Källman
10	MF	GER	Marcel Hartel
11	FW	AUT	Benedikt Pichler
13	MF	GER	Franz Roggow
14	MF	LBN	Husseyn Chakroun
16	DF	GER	Karl Steinmann (on loan from SC Freiburg)
17	DF	GER	Bastian Allgeier
20	DF	RSA	Ime Okon
21	MF	MAW	Mwisho Mhango
22	MF	GER	Noah Engelbreth

No.	Pos.	Nation	Player
23	MF	ISL	Stefán Teitur Þórðarson (captain)
24	MF	GER	Yunus Ünal
25	MF	GER	Lars Gindorf
26	FW	GER	Tom Hobrecht
27	DF	JPN	Hayate Matsuda
28	FW	GER	Taycan Etçibaşı
29	MF	SWE	Kolja Oudenne
30	GK	GER	Leo Weinkauf
33	DF	GER	Maurice Neubauer (vice-captain)
35	DF	GER	Joschua Siewert
37	MF	GER	Alexander Vogel
39	FW	TUR	Taycan Kurt
40	GK	GER	Jonas Schwanke
44	MF	KOS	Emir Sahiti
49	FW	GER	Merlin Sinanović

=== Out on loan ===
Note: Flags indicate national team as defined under FIFA eligibility rules; some limited exceptions apply. Players may hold more than one non-FIFA nationality.

No.	Pos.	Nation	Player
—	DF	FRA	William Kokolo (to Nacional until 30 June 2027)

=== Former players ===
- (Australia) Frank Juric

== Club staff ==
Position	Name
Head coach	(Germany) Sandro Wagner
Assistant coach	(Turkey) Levent Sürme
Video analyst	(Germany) Bjarne Oslender (Germany) Gleart Golemi
Goalkeeper coach	(Germany) Michael Ratajczak
Athletic coach	(Germany) Markus Böker (Germany) Felix Sunkel
Team doctor	(Germany) Prof. Dr. Hauke Mommsen (Germany) Dr. Wego Kregehr
Team doctor/Internist	(Germany) Dr. Jan Meywirth
Physiotherapist	(Germany) Thorsten Klopp (Germany) Rick Schaller
Team manager	(Germany) Fabio Morena
Equipment manager	(Germany) Raymond Saka (Germany) Julian Reese

== Coach history ==
- (Germany) Robert Fuchs (1 July 1931 – 30 June 1946)
- (Germany) Fritz Pölsterl (October 1946–47)
- (Germany) Otto Höxtermann (August 1947 – September 1947)
- (Germany) Robert Fuchs (1 July 1947 – 30 June 1950)
- (Germany) Christian Bieritz (int.) (December 1950)
- (Germany) Paul Slopianka-Hoppe (January 1951–51)
- (Hungary) Emil Izsó (1951–52)
- (Germany) Helmut Kronsbein (1 July 1952 – 30 June 1957)
- (Germany) Kuno Klötzer (1957–58)
- (Germany) Fritz Silken (1958–59)
- (Germany) Günter Grothkopp (1959 – Dec 61)
- (Germany) Hannes Kirk (31 December 1961 – 31 March 1962)
- (Germany) Heinz Lucas (1 July 1962 – 30 June 1963)
- (Germany) Helmut Kronsbein (1 July 1963 – 29 April 1966)
- (Germany) Hannes Kirk (int.) (29 April 1966 – 29 May 1966)
- (Germany) Horst Buhtz (1 July 1966 – 12 August 1968)
- (Germany) Karl-Heinz Mülhausen (int.) (13 February 1968 – 30 June 1968)
- (Socialist Federal Republic of Yugoslavia) Zlatko Čajkovski (1 July 1968 – 8 December 1969)
- (Germany) Rolf Paetz (int.) (December 1969)
- (Germany) Hans Pilz (2 January 1970 – 30 June 1970)
- (Germany) Helmuth Johannsen (1 July 1970 – 13 November 1971)
- (Germany) Hans Hipp (18 November 1971 – 1 March 1973)
- (Germany) Hannes Baldauf (5 March 1973 – 12 March 1974)
- (Germany) Helmut Kronsbein (13 March 1974 – 14 January 1976)
- (Germany) Hannes Baldauf (15 January 1976 – 13 December 1976)
- (Germany) Helmut Kronsbein (1 January 1977 – 30 June 1978)
- (Germany) Anton Burghardt (1 July 1978 – 30 June 1979)
- (Germany) Diethelm Ferner (1 July 1979 – 14 December 1982)
- (Germany) Gerd Bohnsack (10 December 1982 – 24 October 1983)
- (Germany) Werner Biskup (25 October 1983 – 21 November 1985)
- (Germany) Jürgen Rynio (int.) (22 November 1985 – 12 January 1986)
- (Germany) Jörg Berger (13 January 1986 – 17 March 1986)
- (Germany) Helmut Kalthoff (18 March 1986 – 30 June 1986)
- (Germany) Jürgen Wähling (1 July 1986 – 19 September 1988)
- (Germany) Hans Siemensmeyer (19 September 1988 – 21 March 1989)
- (Germany) Reinhard Saftig (22 March 1989 – 30 June 1989)
- (Socialist Federal Republic of Yugoslavia) Slobodan Čendić (1 July 1989 – 31 August 1989)
- (Germany) Michael Krüger (13 September 1989 – 30 September 1990)
- (Germany) Hans-Dieter Schmidt (int.) (1990)
- (Germany) Michael Lorkowski (17 October 1990 – 30 June 1992)
- (Germany) E. Vogel & (Germany) H. Baldauf (1 July 1992 – 8 November 1993)
- (Germany) Rolf Schafstall (9 November 1993 – 30 October 1994)
- (Germany) Stefan Mertesacker (int.) (31 October 1994 – 6 November 1994)
- (Germany) Peter Neururer (7 November 1994 – 30 May 1995)
- (Federal Republic of Yugoslavia) Miloš Đelmaš (int.) (31 May 1995 – 18 June 1995)
- (Germany) Egon Coordes (1 July 1995 – 25 March 1996)
- (Germany) Jürgen Stoffregen (26 March 1996 – 30 June 1996)
- (Germany) Reinhold Fanz (1 July 1996 – 21 December 1998)
- (Germany) Franz Gerber (1 January 1999 – 30 June 1999)
- (Croatia) Branko Ivanković (1 July 1999 – 20 February 2000)
- (Germany) Horst Ehrmantraut (21 February 2000 – 23 April 2001)
- (Czech Republic) Stanislav Levý (int.) (24 April 2001 – 30 June 2001)
- (Germany) R. Rangnick & (Germany) M. Slomka (1 July 2001 – 7 March 2004)
- (Germany) E. Lienen & (Germany) M. Frontzeck (9 March 2004 – 9 November 2005)
- (Germany) Peter Neururer (9 November 2005 – 30 August 2006)
- (Denmark) Michael Schjønberg (int.) (1 September 2006 – 7 September 2006)
- (Germany) Dieter Hecking (8 September 2006 – 19 August 2009)
- (Germany) Andreas Bergmann (20 August 2009 – 19 January 2010)
- (Germany) Mirko Slomka (19 January 2010 – 27 December 2013)
- (Turkey) Tayfun Korkut (31 December 2013 – 20 April 2015)
- (Germany) Michael Frontzeck (20 April 2015 – 21 December 2015)
- (Germany) Thomas Schaaf (4 January 2016 – 3 April 2016)
- (Germany) Daniel Stendel (3 April 2016 – 20 March 2017)
- (Germany) André Breitenreiter (20 March 2017 – 27 January 2019)
- (Germany) Thomas Doll (27 January 2019 – 30 June 2019)
- (Germany) Mirko Slomka (1 July 2019 – 3 November 2019)
- (Bosnia and Herzegovina) Asif Šarić (int.) (4 November 2019 – 14 November 2019)
- (Turkey) Kenan Koçak (14 November 2019 – 30 June 2021)
- (Germany) Jan Zimmermann (1 July 2021 – 29 November 2021)
- (Germany) Christoph Dabrowski (1 December 2021 – 30 June 2022)
- (Germany) Stefan Leitl (1 July 2022 – 29 December 2024)
- (Germany) André Breitenreiter (29 December 2024 – 23 April 2025)
- (Germany) L. Barlemann, (Germany) D. Lottner & (Germany) C. Schulz (int.) (23 April 2025 – 30 June 2025)
- (Germany) Christian Titz (1 July 2025 – 14 September 2026)
- (Germany) Lars Barlemann (int.) (14 September 2026 – 20 September 2026)
- (Germany) Sandro Wagner (21 September 2026 – )

== Hannover 96 Amateure (II) ==
Hannover fields a successful amateur side that has three German amateur championships to its credit (1960, 1964, 1965) as well as losing appearances in the 1966 and 1967 finals. The second team has also taken part in the German Cup tournament and currently plays in the 3. Liga.

=== Honours ===
The team's honours:

- Amateurliga Niedersachsen-West
  - Champions: 1960
- Amateurliga Niedersachsen-Ost
  - Champions: 1964
- Amateurliga Niedersachsen
  - Champions: 1965, 1966, 1967
- German amateur championship
  - Champions: 1960, 1964, 1965
- Lower Saxony Cup
  - Winners: 1982

== Former players ==
- (Denmark) Kaj Poulsen

== See also ==
- List of Hannover 96 seasons
