= 2025–26 SV Werder Bremen season =

SV Werder Bremen
2025–26 season
- President: Hubertus Hess-Grunewald
- Head coach: Horst Steffen (until 1 February 2026); Daniel Thioune (from 4 February 2026)
- Stadium: Weserstadion
- Bundesliga: 16th
- DFB-Pokal: First round
- Top goalscorer: League: Jens Stage (6); All: Jens Stage (6)
- Highest home attendance: 42,100 (30 August 2025 v. Leverkusen) (4 October 2024 v. St. Pauli
- Lowest home attendance: 40,500 (20 September 2025 v. Freiburg) (7 November 2025 vs. Wolfsburg
- Average home league attendance: 41,322
- Biggest win: 4–0 (14 September 2025 vs. Borussia Mönchengladbach)
- Biggest defeat: 0–4 (14 December 2025 vs. Stuttgart)
Home colours	Away colours	Third colours
- All statistics correct as of 31 January 2026.

The 2025–26 season is SV Werder Bremen's 127th season in existence, and the club's fourth consecutive season in the Bundesliga. The club also participated in the DFB-Pokal, falling in the first round.

== Summary ==
On 29 May 2025, Horst Steffen was announced as the new manager of SV Werder Bremen. He was relieved of his duties on 1 February 2026. On 4 February 2026, Daniel Thioune was appointed as his replacement.

== Players ==
As of 11 January 2026

Note: Flags indicate national team as defined under FIFA eligibility rules; some limited exceptions apply. Players may hold more than one non-FIFA nationality.

No.	Pos.	Nation	Player
2	MF	BEL	Olivier Deman
3	DF	JPN	Yukinari Sugawara (on loan from Southampton)
4	DF	GER	Niklas Stark
5	DF	GER	Amos Pieper
6	MF	DEN	Jens Stage
7	FW	BEL	Samuel Mbangula
8	DF	GER	Mitchell Weiser
9	FW	GER	Keke Topp
10	MF	GER	Leonardo Bittencourt
11	FW	GER	Justin Njinmah
13	GK	EST	Karl Hein (on loan from Arsenal)
14	MF	BEL	Senne Lynen
17	FW	AUT	Marco Grüll
18	MF	ESP	Cameron Puertas (on loan from Al Qadsiah)
19	FW	SRB	Jovan Milošević (on loan from VfB Stuttgart)
20	MF	AUT	Romano Schmid

No.	Pos.	Nation	Player
21	FW	NOR	Isak Hansen-Aarøen
22	DF	ARG	Julián Malatini
23	DF	SUI	Isaac Schmidt (on loan from Leeds United)
24	MF	CRO	Patrice Čović
25	GK	GER	Markus Kolke
27	DF	NGR	Felix Agu
28	MF	FRA	Skelly Alvero
29	FW	GER	Salim Musah
30	GK	GER	Mio Backhaus
31	DF	GER	Karim Coulibaly
32	DF	AUT	Marco Friedl (captain)
33	DF	GER	Mick Schmetgens
34	MF	GER	Wesley Adeh
37	GK	BUL	Stefan Smarkalev
39	DF	AUT	Maximilian Wöber (on loan from Leeds United)
44	FW	NGR	Victor Boniface (on loan from Bayer Leverkusen)

=== Out on loan ===
Note: Flags indicate national team as defined under FIFA eligibility rules; some limited exceptions apply. Players may hold more than one non-FIFA nationality.

No.	Pos.	Nation	Player
—	MF	GUI	Naby Keïta (at Ferencváros until 31 December 2025)
—	FW	POL	Dawid Kownacki (at Hertha BSC until 30 June 2026)

== Transfers ==
=== In ===
Date	Pos.	Nat.	Name	Club	Fee	Ref.
23 July 2025	FW	(Belgium)	Samuel Mbangula	(Italy) Juventus	€10 million	

=== Out ===
Date	Pos.	Nat.	Name	Club	Fee	Ref.
1 July 2025	DF	(Serbia) (Switzerland)	Miloš Veljković	(Serbia) Red Star Belgrade	Free transfer	
1 July 2025	FW	(Scotland)	Oliver Burke	(Germany) Union Berlin	Free transfer	
1 July 2025	DF	(Germany)	Anthony Jung	(Germany) Freiburg	Free transfer	
1 July 2025	FW	(Germany)	Abdenego Nankishi	(Germany) VfB Stuttgart II	Free transfer	
7 August 2025	FW	(Germany)	Marvin Ducksch	(England) Birmingham City	€2.00m	
20 August 2025	GK	(Germany)	Michael Zetterer	(Germany) Eintracht Frankfurt	€5.00m	
7 September 2025	MF	(Togo)	Dikeni Salifou	(Belgium) K.V. Mechelen	Undisclosed	

=== Loans in ===
Date	Pos.	Nat.	Name	Club	Duration	Ref.
4 July 2025	DF	(Austria)	Maximilian Wöber	(England) Leeds United	30 June 2026	
22 August 2025	GK	(Estonia)	Karl Hein	(England) Arsenal	30 June 2026	
26 August 2025	DF	(Japan)	Yukinari Sugawara	(England) Southampton	30 June 2026	
1 September 2025	FW	(Nigeria)	Victor Boniface	(Germany) Leverkusen	30 June 2026	
1 September 2025	MF	(Spain)	Cameron Puertas	(Saudi Arabia) Al Qadsiah	30 June 2026	
11 January 2026	FW	(Serbia)	Jovan Milošević	(Germany) Stuttgart	30 June 2026	

=== Loans out ===
Date	Pos.	Nat.	Name	Club	Duration	Ref.
24 July 2025	FW	(Poland)	Dawid Kownacki	(Germany) Hertha BSC	30 June 2026	

=== New Contracts ===
Date	Pos.	Nat.	Name	Contract Until	Ref.
18 July 2025	MF	(Belgium)	Senne Lynen	30 June 2028	

== Pre-season and friendlies ==
Win Draw Loss Fixtures

12 July 2025 Friendly	FC Verden 04	0–6	Werder Bremen	Verden an der Aller
14:30 CEST (UTC+2)		Report	Pieper 5'; Opitz 36'; Hansen-Aarøen 44'; Covic 49', 57'; Njinmah 55'	Stadium: Stadion am Berliner Ring; Attendance: 5,500; Referee: Tom Holsten

19 July 2025 Friendly	Kickers Emden	1–3	Werder Bremen	Emden
14:30 CEST (UTC+2)	Eickhoff 25'	Report	Malatini 33'; Grüll 56' (Pieper); Adeh 75' (Grüll)	Stadium: Ostfriesland-Stadion; Attendance: 7,200; Referee: Jost Steenken

26 July 2025 Friendly	Werder Bremen	0–0	Parma Calcio	Zell am Ziller, Austria
14:00 CEST (UTC+2)		Report		Stadium: Parkstadion Zell am Ziller; Attendance: 2,000; Referee: Samuel Sampl

1 August 2025 Friendly	Hoffenheim	1–0	Werder Bremen	Schwaz, Austria
12:00 CEST (UTC+2)	Machida 19'	Report		Stadium: Silberstadt Arena Schwaz; Attendance: 2,000; Referee: Stjepan Bosnjak

1 August 2025 Friendly	Hoffenheim	3–0	Werder Bremen	Schwaz, Austria
14:00 CEST (UTC+2)	Orban 46'; Burger 51'; Prass 85'; Damar (penalty missed) 90+1'	Report		Stadium: Silberstadt Arena Schwaz; Attendance: 2,000; Referee: Andreas Schett

9 August 2025 Friendly	Werder Bremen	1–2	Udinese Calcio	Bremen
15:30 CEST (UTC+2)	Schmid 53' (pen.); Coulibaly (yellow card) 66'; Deman (yellow card) 71'	Report	Ehizibue (yellow card) 27'; Davis 28'; Palma 38'; Solet (yellow card) 52'; Zarraga (yellow card) 90+2'	Stadium: Weserstadion; Attendance: 27,500; Referee: Felix Bickel

== Competitions ==
=== Overall record ===
Competition	First match	Last match	Starting round	Final position	Record							
Competition	First match	Last match	Starting round	Final position	Pld	W	D	L	GF	GA	GD	Win %
Bundesliga	23 August 2025		Matchday 1		31	8	8	15	36	54	−18	25.81
DFB-Pokal	19 August 2025	19 August 2025	First round	First round	1	0	0	1	0	1	−1	0.00
Total					32	8	8	16	36	55	−19	25.00

Last updated: 26 April 2026
Source: Soccerway

=== Bundesliga ===
==== League table ====
Pos	Team	Pld	W	D	L	GF	GA	GD	Pts	Qualification or relegation
13	Hamburger SV	34	9	11	14	40	54	−14	38	
14	1. FC Köln	34	7	11	16	49	63	−14	32	
15	Werder Bremen	34	8	8	18	37	60	−23	32	
16	VfL Wolfsburg (R)	34	7	8	19	45	69	−24	29	Qualification for the relegation play-offs
17	1. FC Heidenheim (R)	34	6	8	20	41	72	−31	26	Relegation to 2. Bundesliga

Source: Bundesliga
Rules for classification: 1) Points; 2) Goal difference; 3) Goals scored; 4) Head-to-head results; 5) Head-to-head away goals scored; 6) Away goals scored; 7) Play-off.
(Rules 4–6 only apply after home and away matches have been played between the tied teams.)
(R) Relegated

==== Results summary ====
Overall								Home						Away					
Pld	W	D	L	GF	GA	GD	Pts	W	D	L	GF	GA	GD	W	D	L	GF	GA	GD
31	8	8	15	36	54	−18	32	5	4	7	18	27	−9	3	4	8	18	27	−9

Last updated: 26 April 2026.
Source: DFB

==== Results by round ====
Round	1	2	3	4	5	6	7	8	9	10	11	12	13	14	15	16	17	18	19	20	21	22	23	24	25	26	27	28	29	30	31	32	33	34
Ground	A	H	A	H	A	H	A	H	A	H	A	H	A	H	A	H	A	H	A	H	H	H	A	H	A	H	A	H	A	H	A	H	A	H
Result	L	D	W	L	L	W	D	W	D	W	L	D	L	L	D	L	L	D	L	D	L	L	L	W	W	L	W	L	L	W	D			
Position	17	16	9	14	16	12	12	9	8	8	11	11	11	12	10	15	13	14	15	15	16	16	16	15	14	15	14	15	15	14	12			
Points	0	1	4	4	4	7	8	11	12	15	15	16	16	16	17	17	18	18	18	19	19	19	19	22	25	25	28	28	28	31	32			

Updated to match(es) played on 26 April 2026. Source: DFB
A = Away; H = Home; W = Win; D = Draw; L = Loss

==== Matches ====
23 August 2025 1	Eintracht Frankfurt	4–1	Werder Bremen	Frankfurt
14:30 CEST (UTC+2)	Kristensen (yellow card) 12'; Uzun 22' (Larsson); Bahoya 25' (Uzun) 47' (Uzun); Knauff 70' (Chaïbi)	Report	Malatini (yellow card) 35'; Njinmah 48' (Grüll) (yellow card) 58'; Stark (yellow card) 58'	Stadium: Deutsche Bank Park; Referee: Harm Osmers

30 August 2025 2	Werder Bremen	3–3	Leverkusen	Bremen
14:30 CEST (UTC+2)	Lynen (yellow card) 37'; Schmid 44' (pen.); Stark (yellow card) 45+4' (yellow-red card) 63'; Schmidt 76' (Topp) (yellow card) 90+1'; Coulibaly 90+4'	Report	5' (Tella) Schick; 35' Tillman; Kofane (yellow card) 57'; 64' (pen) Schick; (yellow card) 70' Tella; (yellow card) 86' Quansah	Stadium: Weserstadion; Attendance: 42,100; Referee: Robin Braun

14 September 2025 3	Borussia Mönchengladbach	0–4	Werder Bremen	Mönchengladbach
17:30 CEST (UTC+2)	Machino (yellow card) 38'	Report	Mbangula 15' (Sugawara); Stage 26' (Mbagula); Schmid 73' (pen.); Njinmah 81' (Boniface)	Stadium: Borussia-Park; Attendance: 52,000; Referee: Matthias Jöllenbeck

20 September 2025 4	Werder Bremen	0–3	Freiburg	Bremen
14:30 CEST (UTC+2)	Cameron Puertas (yellow card) 36'; Stage (yellow card) 48'; Grüll (yellow card) 49'; Agu (yellow card) 71'; Boniface (yellow card) 90'	Report	Grifo 33' (pen.); Beste (yellow card) 35'; Adamu 54' (Grifo); Coulibaly 75' (o.g.); Kübler (yellow card) 82'	Stadium: Weserstadion; Attendance: 40,500; Referee: Timo Gerach

26 September 2025 5	Bayern Munich	4–0	Werder Bremen	Munich
18:30 CEST (UTC+2)	Gnabry (yellow card) 16'; Tah 22' (Olise); Kane 45' (pen.); Kimmich (yellow card) 65'; Laimer 87' (Bischof)	Report		Stadium: Allianz Arena; Attendance: 75,000; Referee: Frank Willenborg

4 October 2025 6	Werder Bremen	1–0	St. Pauli	Bremen
14:30 CEST (UTC+2)	Mbangula 2'; Puertas (yellow card) 68'; Stage (yellow card) 72'; Grüll (yellow card) 90'	Report	Saliakas (yellow card) 90+5'	Stadium: Weserstadion; Attendance: 42,100; Referee: Sören Storks

18 October 2025 7	Heidenheim	2–2	Werder Bremen	Heidenheim an der Brenz
15:30 CEST (UTC+2)	Siersleben (yellow card) 11'; Schimmer 67' (Busch); Föhrenbach 83' (Mainka)	Report	Puertas (yellow card) 34'; Čović (yellow card) 45+2'; Grüll 50' (Schmid); Stage 69' (Schmid); Bittencourt (yellow card) 83'	Stadium: Voith-Arena; Attendance: 15,000; Referee: Patrick Ittrich

24 October 2025 8	Werder Bremen	1–0	Union Berlin	Bremen
21:30 CEST (UTC+2)	Coulibaly (yellow card) 23'; Grüll (yellow card) 70' (goal) 72' (Sugawara); Topp (yellow card) 90+1'; Pieper (yellow card) 90+2'	Report		Stadium: Weserstadion; Attendance: 41,800; Referee: Daniel Schlager

1 November 2025 9	Mainz	1–1	Werder Bremen	Mainz
15:30 CET (UTC+1)	Widmer 36' (Hollerbach); Veratschnig (yellow card) 90+2'	Report	Friedl (yellow card) 45'; Coulibaly (yellow card) 59'; Stage 86'; Topp (yellow card) 88'	Stadium: MEWA Arena; Attendance: 33,305; Referee: Florian Badstübner

7 November 2025 10	Werder Bremen	2–1	Wolfsburg	Bremen
20:30 CET (UTC+1)	Friedl (yellow card) 61'; Stage 83' (Sugawara); Mbangula 90+4' (Boniface); Schmid (yellow card) 90+6'	Report	Svanberg 28'	Stadium: Weserstadion; Attendance: 40,500; Referee: Felix Zwayer

23 November 2025 11	RB Leipzig	2–0	Werder Bremen	Leipzig
15:30 CET (UTC+1)	Harder (yellow card) 41'; Ouédraogo 63' (Baku); Schlager 80' (Baumgartner)	Report	Friedl (yellow card) 17'; Pieper (yellow card) 69'	Stadium: Red Bull Arena; Referee: Martin Petersen

29 November 2025 12	Werder Bremen	1–1	Köln	Bremen
15:30 CET (UTC+1)	Friedl 22'; Stark (yellow card) 75' (yellow-red card) 90+6'	Report	Castro-Montes (yellow card) 38'; Thielmann (yellow card) 75'; Martel (yellow card) 78'; El Mala 90+1' (Lund); Bülter (yellow card) 90+6'	Stadium: Weserstadion; Attendance: 41,800; Referee: Bastian Dankert

6 December 2025 13	Hamburg	3–2	Werder Bremen	Hamburg
15:30 CET (UTC+1)	Vušković (yellow card) 56'; Lokonga 63'; Poulsen 84' (Jatta); Remberg (yellow card) 90+7'	Report	Stage (yellow card) 32' (goal) 45' (Schmid); Topp (yellow card) 62'; Grüll (yellow card) 69'; Friedl (yellow card) 74'; Njinmah 78' (Schmid); Coulibaly (yellow card) 90+4'; Schmid (yellow card) 90+5'	Stadium: Volksparkstadion; Attendance: 56,100; Referee: Sascha Stegemann

13 December 2025 14	Werder Bremen	0–4	Stuttgart	Bremen
12:30 CET (UTC+1)	Coulibaly (yellow card) 11' (yellow-red card) 59'	Report	El Khannouss 40' (Leweling); Leweling 44' (Jeltsch); Undav 79' (Leweling); Führich 90+7' (Mittelstädt)	Stadium: Weserstadion; Attendance: 41,800; Referee: Robert Hartmann

20 December 2025 15	Augsburg	0–0	Werder Bremen	Augsburg
15:30 CET (UTC+1)	Giannoulis (yellow card) 45+4'; Banks (yellow card) 65'; Zesiger (yellow card) 90+4'	Report	Schmid (yellow card) 45+4'; Pieper (yellow card) 74'; Lynen (yellow card) 90+5'; Sugawara (yellow card) 90+9'	Stadium: WWK Arena; Attendance: 30,000; Referee: Tobias Welz

13 January 2026 17	Borussia Dortmund	3–0	Werder Bremen	Dortmund
13:30 CET (UTC+1)	Schlotterbeck 11' (Ryerson); Süle (yellow card) 23'; Sabitzer (yellow card) 54' (goal) 76' (Nmecha); Guirassy 83' (Bellingham)	Report		Stadium: Westfalenstadion; Attendance: 81,365; Referee: Daniel Siebert

16 January 2026 18	Werder Bremen	3–3	Eintracht Frankfurt	Bremen
13:30 CET (UTC+1)	Njinmah 29' (Sugawara); Schmid (yellow card) 52'; Stage 78' (Mbangula); Milošević 80' (Schmid)	Report	Kalimuendo 1' (Brown); Collins 56' (Chaïbi); Theate (yellow card) 66'; Dōan (yellow card) 78'; Amaimouni (yellow card) 85'; Knauff 90+4' (Amaimouni); Brown (yellow card) 90+6'	Stadium: Weserstadion; Attendance: 41,800; Referee: Benjamin Brand

24 January 2026 19	Bayer Leverkusen	1–0	Werder Bremen	Leverkusen
13:30 CET (UTC+1)	Lucas 37' (Maza); Hofmann (yellow card) 78'; Badé (yellow card) 87'	Report	Friedl (yellow card) 78'; Malatini (yellow card) 88'; Deman (yellow card) 90+6'	Stadium: BayArena; Attendance: 30,210; Referee: Tobias Reichel

27 January 2026 16	Werder Bremen	0–2	TSG Hoffenheim	Bremen
21:30 CET (UTC+1)		Report		Stadium: Weserstadion; Attendance: 39,500; Referee: Frank Willenborg

31 January 2026 20	Werder Bremen	1–1	Borussia Monchengladbach	Bremen
16:30 CET (UTC+1)	Topp 90+4' (Deman)	Report	Reitz (yellow card) 44'; Tabaković 61' (Honorat)	Stadium: Weserstadion; Attendance: 41,800; Referee: Felix Zwayer

7 February 2026 21	Freiburg	1–0	Werder Bremen	Freiburg im Breisgau
16:30 CET (UTC+1)	Beste 13' (Matanović); Manzambi (red card) 52'; Schuster (yellow card) 90+1'	Report	Friedl (yellow card) 90'	Stadium: Europa-Park Stadion; Attendance: 34,700; Referee: Deniz Aytekin

14 February 2026 22	Werder Bremen	0–3	Bayern Munich	Bremen
15:30 CET	Lynen (yellow card) 28'; Stark (yellow card) 37'; Puertas (yellow card) 90'	Report	Kane 22' (pen.); Goretzka 70' (Davies); Musiala (yellow card) 80'	Stadium: Weserstadion; Attendance: 42,100; Referee: Bastian Dankert

22 February 2026 23	St. Pauli	2–1	Werder Bremen	Hamburg
16:30 CET (UTC+1)	Kaars (yellow card) 29'; Wahl 55' (Sinani); Fujita 70' (Saliakas); Saliakas (yellow card) 75'	Report	Schmidt (yellow card) 7'; Lynen (yellow card) 54'; Milošević 72'; Friedl (yellow card) 75'; Bittencourt (yellow card) 76'; Stark (yellow card) 88'	Stadium: Millerntor-Stadion; Attendance: 29,546; Referee: Sören Storks

28 February 2026 24	Werder Bremen	2–0	Heidenheim	Bremen
16:30 CET (UTC+1)	Milošević 57'; Behrens 90+7' (o.g.)	Report		Stadium: Weserstadion; Attendance: 40,000; Referee: Florian Badstübner

8 March 2026 25	Union Berlin	1–4	Werder Bremen	Berlin
17:30 CET (UTC+1)	Köhn 18' (pen.); Schäfer (red card) 19'; Querfeld (yellow card) 69'	Report	Stark (yellow card) 16'; Deman 31'; Stage 35'; Topp (yellow card) 36'; Grüll 66'; Malatini (yellow card) 78'; Čović 90+4'	Stadium: Stadion An der Alten Försterei; Attendance: 22,012; Referee: Timo Gerach

15 March 2026 24	Werder Bremen	0–2	Mainz	Bremen
16:30 CET (UTC+1)		Report	Nebel 6'; Lee 52'	Stadium: Weserstadion; Attendance: 41,800; Referee: Sacha Stegemann

21 March 2026 27	Wolfsburg	0–1	Werder Bremen	Wolfsburg
15:30 CET (UTC+1)	Jenz (yellow card) (red card) 90+2'	Report	Njinmah 68'	Stadium: Volkswagen Arena; Attendance: 28,917; Referee: Benjamin Brand

4 April 2026 28	Werder Bremen	1–2	RB Leipzig	Bremen
15:30 CEST (UTC+2)	Puertas (yellow card) 73'; Musah 90+4'; Friedl (yellow card) 90+8'	Report	Nusa 15'; Rômulo 52'; Gomis (yellow card) 90+2'	Stadium: Weser-Stadion; Attendance: 40,000; Referee: Robert Hartmann

11 April 2026 29	1. FC Köln	3–1	Werder Bremen	Cologne
15:30 CEST (UTC+2)	El Mala 7' (pen.); Ache 65' (yellow card) 71'; Simpson-Pusey (yellow card) 84'; Martel (yellow card) 90+1'; Jóhannesson 90+7'	Report	Friedl (red card) 24'; Schmid 76' (pen.); Bittencourt (yellow card) 78'; Pieper (yellow card) 90'	Stadium: RheinEnergieStadion; Attendance: 50,000; Referee: Tobias Reichel

18 April 2026 30	Werder Bremen	3–1	Hamburger SV	Weserstadion
	Stage 37', 57'; Puertas 90+1'	Report	Glatzel 41'; Otele (red card) 79'	Attendance: 41,800; Referee: Florian Exner

26 April 2026 31	VfB Stuttgart	1–1	Werder Bremen	Stuttgart
15:30 CEST (UTC+2)	Demirović 61'	Report	Stage 18'; Backhaus (yellow card) 78'	Stadium: MHPArena; Attendance: 60,000; Referee: Christian Dingert

32	v

33	v

34	v

=== DFB-Pokal ===
15 August 2025 First Round	Arminia Bielefeld	1–0	Werder Bremen	Bielefeld
CEST (UTC+2)	Kniat (yellow card) 75'; Boakya (yellow card) 80'; Young 90+3' (Boakya)	Report	Lynen (yellow card) 9'; Friedl (yellow card) 43'; Bittencourt (yellow card) 52' (yellow-red card) 54'; Deman (yellow card) 90+1'	Stadium: Bielefelder Alm; Attendance: 26,742; Referee: Robert Hartmann

== Statistics ==
As of 22 February 2026

=== Appearances and goals ===
No.	Pos	Nat	Player	Total		Bundesliga		DFB Pokal	
No.	Pos	Nat	Player	Apps	Goals	Apps	Goals	Apps	Goals
2	MF	(Belgium) BEL	Olivier Deman	5	0	2+2	0	0+1	0
3	DF	(Japan) JPN	Yukinari Sugawara	19	0	19	0	0	0
4	DF	(Germany) GER	Niklas Stark	10	0	5+4	0	1	0
5	DF	(Denmark) DEN	Amos Pieper	12	0	12	0	0	0
6	MF	(Denmark) DEN	Jens Stage	21	6	20	6	1	0
7	FW	(Belgium) BEL	Samuel Mbangula	19	3	11+7	3	0+1	0
9	FW	(Germany) GER	Keke Topp	17	1	5+11	1	0+1	0
10	MF	(Germany) GER	Leonardo Bittencourt	10	0	1+8	0	1	0
11	FW	(Germany) GER	Justin Njinmah	21	4	14+6	4	1	0
13	GK	(Estonia) EST	Karl Hein	2	0	2	0	0	0
14	MF	(Belgium) BEL	Senne Lynen	22	0	21	0	1	0
17	FW	(Austria) AUT	Marco Grüll	23	2	17+5	2	1	0
18	MF	(Spain) ESP	Cameron Puertas	16	0	10+6	0	0	0
19	FW	(Serbia) SRB	Jovan Milošević	6	2	0+6	2	0	0
20	MF	(Austria) AUT	Romano Schmid	23	2	22	2	1	0
21	FW	(Norway) NOR	Isak Hansen-Aarøen	1	0	0+1	0	0	0
22	DF	(Argentina) ARG	Julián Malatini	6	0	3+3	0	0	0
23	DF	(Switzerland) SUI	Isaac Schmidt	13	1	5+8	1	0	0
24	MF	(Croatia) CRO	Patrice Čović	10	0	2+7	0	1	0
27	DF	(Nigeria) NGR	Felix Agu	9	0	7+1	0	1	0
28	MF	(France) FRA	Skelly Alvero	2	0	0+2	0	0	0
30	GK	(Germany) GER	Mio Backhaus	19	0	19	0	0	0
31	DF	(Germany) GER	Karim Coulibaly	18	1	17+1	1	0	0
32	DF	(Austria) AUT	Marco Friedl	27	1	26	1	1	0
39	DF	(Austria) AUT	Maximilian Wöber	1	0	0	0	1	0
44	FW	(Nigeria) NGR	Victor Boniface	11	0	2+9	0	0	0
Players away from the club on loan:
Players who left Werder Bremen during the season:
1	GK	(Germany) GER	Michael Zetterer	1	0	0	0	1	0

=== Goalscorers ===
Rank	Pos.	Nat.	No.	Player	Bundesliga	DFB-Pokal	Total
1	MF	(Denmark)	6	Jens Stage	6	0	6
2	FW	(Germany)	11	Justin Njinmah	4	0	4
3	FW	(Belgium)	7	Samuel Mbangula	3	0	3
4	MF	(Austria)	20	Romano Schmid	2	0	2
4	FW	(Austria)	17	Marco Grüll	2	0	2
4	FW	(Serbia)	19	Jovan Milošević	2	0	2
7	DF	(Switzerland)	23	Isaac Schmidt	1	0	1
7	DF	(Germany)	31	Karim Coulibaly	1	0	1
7	DF	(Austria)	32	Marco Friedl	1	0	1
7	FW	(Germany)	9	Keke Topp	1	0	1
Opponent's own goal(s)					0	0	0
Total					23	0	23

=== Assists ===
Rank	Pos.	Nat.	No.	Player	Bundesliga	DFB-Pokal	Total
1	MF	(Austria)	20	Romano Schmid	5	0	5
2	DF	(Japan)	3	Yukinari Sugawara	4	0	4
3	FW	(Nigeria)	44	Victor Boniface	2	0	2
3	FW	(Belgium)	7	Samuel Mbangula	2	0	2
5	FW	(Germany)	9	Keke Topp	1	0	1
5	MF	(Denmark)	6	Jens Stage	1	0	1
5	MF	(Belgium)	2	Olivier Deman	1	0	1
Total					16	0	16

=== Clean sheets ===
Rank	Pos.	Nat.	No.	Player	Bundesliga	DFB-Pokal	Total
1	GK	(Germany)	30	Mio Backhaus	3	0	3
2	GK	(Estonia)	13	Karl Hein	1	0	1
Total					4	0	4

=== Hat-tricks ===
Player	Against	Result	Date	Competition	Ref.

=== Disciplinary record ===
No.	Nat.	Pos.	Player	Bundesliga			DFB-Pokal			Total		
No.	Nat.	Pos.	Player	Yellow card	(yellow card) (yellow-red card)	Red card	Yellow card	(yellow card) (yellow-red card)	Red card	Yellow card	(yellow card) (yellow-red card)	Red card
2	(Belgium)	MF	Olivier Deman	1	0	0	1	0	0	2	0	0
3	(Japan)	DF	Yukinari Sugawara	1	0	0	0	0	0	1	0	0
4	(Germany)	DF	Niklas Stark	5	2	0	0	0	0	5	2	0
5	(Germany)	DF	Amos Pieper	3	0	0	0	0	0	3	0	0
6	(Denmark)	MF	Jens Stage	3	0	0	0	0	0	3	0	0
9	(Germany)	FW	Keke Topp	3	0	0	0	0	0	3	0	0
10	(Germany)	MF	Leonardo Bittencourt	1	0	0	1	1	0	2	1	0
11	(Germany)	FW	Justin Njinmah	1	0	0	0	0	0	1	0	0
14	(Germany)	MF	Senne Lynen	4	0	0	1	0	0	5	0	0
17	(Austria)	MF	Marco Grüll	4	0	0	0	0	0	4	0	0
18	(Spain)	MF	Cameron Puertas	4	0	0	0	0	0	4	0	0
20	(Austria)	MF	Romano Schmid	4	0	0	0	0	0	4	0	0
22	(Argentina)	DF	Julián Malatini	2	0	0	0	0	0	2	0	0
23	(Switzerland)	DF	Isaac Schmidt	2	0	0	0	0	0	2	0	0
24	(Croatia)	MF	Patrice Čović	1	0	0	0	0	0	1	0	0
27	(Nigeria)	DF	Felix Agu	1	0	0	0	0	0	1	0	0
31	(Germany)	DF	Karim Coulibaly	3	1	0	0	0	0	2	0	0
32	(Austria)	DF	Marco Friedl	7	0	0	1	0	0	8	0	0
44	(Nigeria)	FW	Victor Boniface	1	0	0	0	0	0	1	0	0
Total				51	3	0	4	1	0	55	4	0

=== Home attendance ===
Competition	Total	Matches	Average
Bundesliga	374,200	9	41,578
DFB-Pokal	0	0	0
Total	374,200	9	41,578
