= Karim Coulibaly (footballer, born 2007) =

German footballer

Personal information
- Full name: Abdoul Karim Coulibaly
- Date of birth: 23 May 2007 (age 19)
- Place of birth: Oldenburg, Germany
- Height: 1.91 m (6 ft 3 in)
- Position: Centre-back

Team information
- Current team: Strasbourg
- Number: 31

Youth career
- 2016–2018: HSV Barmbek-Uhlenhorst
- 2018–2024: Hamburger SV
- 2024–2025: Werder Bremen

Senior career*
Years	Team	Apps	(Gls)
2025–2026	Werder Bremen	27	(1)
2026–	Strasbourg	5	(0)

International career^{‡}
2024	Germany U17	7	(0)
2025–	Germany U18	2	(0)
2025–	Germany U19	4	(0)
2026–	Germany U21	4	(0)
- * Club domestic league appearances and goals as of 17 October 2026 ‡ National team caps and goals as of 18:40, 6 October 2026 (UTC)

Abdoul Karim Coulibaly (born 23 May 2007) is a German professional footballer who plays as a centre-back for Ligue 1 club Strasbourg. He is a German youth international.

== Club career ==
Coulibaly was born in Oldenburg, Germany. He began his youth career at HSV Barmbek-Uhlenhorst, before leaving for Hamburger SV in 2018, and would play at HSV for six years, eventually leaving for Werder Bremen in 2024. The club's academy director Björn Schierenbeck said on Coulibaly's signing, "He's athletically strong, incredibly fast, and versatile in central defense and defensive midfield". In the 2024–25 season, Coulibaly won the under-19 DFB-Pokal.

Coulibaly began training for the first team towards the end of the 2024–25 season, as well as being named a substitute in a Bundesliga match against VfL Wolfsburg, In July 2025, Coulibaly signed his first professional contract for Werder Bremen. Coulibaly made his professional senior debut for Bremen on 23 August 2025, coming on as a substitute in a 4–1 loss to Eintracht Frankfurt. A week later, on 30 August, he scored his first goal in a 3–3 draw with Bayer Leverkusen, aged 18 years and 99 days, becoming the youngest scorer in the club's Bundesliga history, surpassing the previous record held by Aaron Hunt.

On 21 August 2026, Coulibaly signed a five-year contract with Ligue 1 side Strasbourg. The transfer fee was reportedly €20m.

== International career ==
Coulibaly is eligible for Germany and Ivory Coast, and has made three appearances for the Germany under-17 national team.

== Career statistics ==
=== Club ===
As of match played 17 October 2026

Appearances and goals by club, season and competition
Club	Season	League			National cup		Continental		Other		Total	
Club	Season	Division	Apps	Goals	Apps	Goals	Apps	Goals	Apps	Goals	Apps	Goals
Werder Bremen	2025–26	Bundesliga	27	1	0	0	—		—		27	1
Strasbourg	2026–27	Ligue 1	5	0	0	0	—		—		5	0
Career total			32	1	0	0	0	0	0	0	32	1
