= 2022–23 SV Werder Bremen season =

Werder Bremen
2022–23 season
- President: Hubertus Hess-Grunewald
- Head coach: Ole Werner
- Stadium: Weser-Stadion
- Bundesliga: 13th
- DFB-Pokal: Second round
- Top goalscorer: League: Niclas Füllkrug (16); All: Niclas Füllkrug (16)
Home colours	Away colours	Third colours

The 2022–23 season was the 124th season in the history of SV Werder Bremen and their first season back in the top flight. The club participated in the Bundesliga and the DFB-Pokal.

== Players ==
=== Current squad ===
As of 30 January 2023

Note: Flags indicate national team as defined under FIFA eligibility rules; some limited exceptions apply. Players may hold more than one non-FIFA nationality.

No.	Pos.	Nation	Player
1	GK	CZE	Jiří Pavlenka
3	DF	GER	Anthony Jung
4	DF	GER	Niklas Stark
5	DF	GER	Amos Pieper
6	MF	DEN	Jens Stage
7	FW	GER	Marvin Ducksch
8	DF	GER	Mitchell Weiser
10	MF	GER	Leonardo Bittencourt
11	FW	GER	Niclas Füllkrug
13	DF	SRB	Miloš Veljković
17	FW	GER	Maximilian Philipp (on loan from VfL Wolfsburg)
19	MF	TOG	Dikeni Salifou
20	MF	AUT	Romano Schmid

No.	Pos.	Nation	Player
21	FW	GER	Eren Dinkçi
22	MF	GER	Niklas Schmidt
26	DF	ENG	Lee Buchanan
27	DF	GER	Felix Agu
28	MF	BUL	Ilia Gruev
30	GK	GER	Michael Zetterer
32	DF	AUT	Marco Friedl (captain)
34	MF	GER	Jean-Manuel Mbom
36	DF	GER	Christian Groß
37	GK	GER	Mio Backhaus
38	GK	GER	Dudu
39	DF	ITA	Fabio Chiarodia
40	GK	GER	Louis Lord

=== Players out on loan ===
Note: Flags indicate national team as defined under FIFA eligibility rules; some limited exceptions apply. Players may hold more than one non-FIFA nationality.

No.	Pos.	Nation	Player
—	DF	KOR	Park Kyu-hyun (to Dynamo Dresden until 30 June 2023)
—	DF	GER	Dominik Becker (to 1. FC Saarbrücken until 30 June 2023)
—	MF	GER	Oscar Schönfelder (to Jahn Regensburg until 30 June 2023)
—	MF	GER	Yannik Engelhardt (to SC Freiburg II until 30 June 2023)
—	MF	GER	Nicolai Rapp (to 1. FC Kaiserslautern until 30 June 2023)

No.	Pos.	Nation	Player
—	FW	SCO	Oliver Burke (to Millwall until 30 June 2023)
—	FW	GER	Nick Woltemade (to SV Elversberg until 30 June 2023)
—	FW	GER	Justin Njinmah (to Borussia Dortmund II until 30 June 2023)
—	FW	GER	Abdenego Nankishi (to Heracles Almelo until 30 June 2023)

== Transfers ==
=== In ===
No.	Pos.	Player	Transferred from	Fee	Date	Source
5	DF	(Germany) Amos Pieper	Arminia Bielefeld	Free	1 July 2022	
4	DF	(Germany) Niklas Stark	Hertha BSC	Free	1 July 2022	
6	MF	(Denmark) Jens Stage	Copenhagen	€4–6 million	1 July 2022	
9	FW	(Scotland) Oliver Burke	Sheffield United	Free	1 July 2022	
26	DF	(England) Lee Buchanan	Derby County	Free	4 July 2022	
8	DF	(Germany) Mitchell Weiser	Bayer Leverkusen	Free	18 July 2022	
17	FW	(Germany) Maximilian Philipp	VfL Wolfsburg	Loan	30 January 2023	

=== Out ===
No.	Pos.	Player	Transferred to	Fee	Date	Source
40	GK	(Germany) Luca Plogmann			1 July 2022	
21	DF	(Turkey) Ömer Toprak			1 July 2022	
15	FW	(Ivory Coast) Roger Assalé	Dijon	Loan return	1 July 2022	
26	DF	(Germany) Lars Lukas Mai	Bayern Munich	Loan return	1 July 2022	
8	DF	(Germany) Mitchell Weiser	Bayer Leverkusen	Loan return	1 July 2022	
24	MF	(Germany) Benjamin Goller	1. FC Nürnberg		1 January 2023	
23	MF	(Germany) Nicolai Rapp	1. FC Kaiserslautern	Loan	2 January 2023	
9	FW	(Scotland) Oliver Burke	Millwall	Loan	30 January 2023	

== Pre-season and friendlies ==
Win Draw Loss Fixtures

25 June 2022 Friendly	Werder Bremen	1–3	VfB Oldenburg	Verden an der Aller, Germany
16:00 CEST (UTC+2)	Goller 26'	Report	Ifeadigo 55', 62'; Schulz 76'	Stadium: Stadion am Berliner Ring

3 July 2022 Friendly	Karlsruher SC	1–2	Werder Bremen	Zell am Ziller, Germany
15:30 CEST (UTC+2)	Rapp 3'	Report	Burke 46', 86'	Stadium: Parkstadion Zell am Ziller

9 July 2022 Friendly	Beşiktaş	2–1	Werder Bremen	Innsbruck, Austria
16:00 CEST (UTC+2)	Montero (yellow card) 57'; Uçan 67' (pen.); Akgün 77'; Kilicsoy (yellow card) 90+3'	Report	Dinkçi 48'; Stage (yellow card) 65'	Stadium: Tivoli Stadion Tirol; Referee: Walter Altmann (Austria)

16 July 2022 Friendly	Twente	3–3	Werder Bremen	Enschede, Netherlands
--:-- CEST (UTC+2)	Ugalde 45'; Van Wolfswinkel 65'; Cleonise 89'	Report	Ducksch 26'; Weiser 79'; Schmidt 100'	Stadium: FC Twente-Trainingscentrum; Attendance: 0
Note: Match was played in two 60-minute halves. Match was played behind closed doors due to security concerns.

23 July 2022 Friendly	Werder Bremen	6–1	Groningen	Bremen, Germany
14:15 CEST (UTC+2)	Ducksch 13', 16', 67'; Buchanan 37'; Füllkrug 48' (pen.), 52'	Report	Ngonge 9'	Stadium: Platz 12; Attendance: 0
Note: Match was played behind closed doors due to security concerns.

23 July 2022 Friendly	Werder Bremen	0–0	Emmen	Bremen, Germany
17:00 CEST (UTC+2)		Report		Stadium: Platz 12; Attendance: 0
Note: Match was played behind closed doors due to security concerns.

22 September 2022 Friendly	Hannover 96	2–0	Werder Bremen	Hanover, Germany
16:00 CEST (UTC+2)	Tresoldi 54', 82'	Report		Stadium: Eilenriedestadion; Referee: Harm Osmers

15 November 2022 Friendly	Heeslinger SC	1–3	Werder Bremen	Heeslingen, Germany
19:00 CET (UTC+1)				Stadium: Waldstadion

15 December 2022 Friendly	Werder Bremen	1–0	SV Meppen	Bremen, Germany
14:00 CET (UTC+1)	Berger 82'			Stadium: Weserstadion Platz 11

4 January 2023 Friendly	Real Murcia	0–2	Werder Bremen	San Pedro del Pinatar, Spain
12:30 CET (UTC+1)				Stadium: Pinatar Arena

8 January 2023 Friendly	Werder Bremen	2–2	St. Gallen	San Pedro del Pinatar, Spain
15:30 CET (UTC+1)				Stadium: Pinatar Arena

14 January 2023 Friendly	Schalke 04	0–1	Werder Bremen	Gelsenkirchen, Germany
15:30 CET (UTC+1)		Report	Füllkrug 4'	Stadium: VELTINS-Arena; Attendance: 18,464; Referee: Florian Exner

== Competitions ==
=== Overall record ===
Competition	First match	Last match	Starting round	Final position	Record							
Competition	First match	Last match	Starting round	Final position	Pld	W	D	L	GF	GA	GD	Win %
Bundesliga	6 August 2022	27 May 2023	Matchday 1	13th	34	10	6	18	51	64	−13	29.41
DFB-Pokal	1 August 2022	19 October 2022	First round	Second round	2	1	1	0	4	3	+1	50.00
Total					36	11	7	18	55	67	−12	30.56

Source: Soccerway

=== Bundesliga ===
==== League table ====
Pos	Team	Pld	W	D	L	GF	GA	GD	Pts
11	1. FC Köln	34	10	12	12	49	54	−5	42
12	1899 Hoffenheim	34	10	6	18	48	57	−9	36
13	Werder Bremen	34	10	6	18	51	64	−13	36
14	VfL Bochum	34	10	5	19	40	72	−32	35
15	FC Augsburg	34	9	7	18	42	63	−21	34

Source: DFB
Rules for classification: 1) Points; 2) Goal difference; 3) Goals scored; 4) Head-to-head results; 5) Head-to-head away goals scored; 6) Away goals scored; 7) Play-off.

==== Results summary ====
Overall								Home						Away					
Pld	W	D	L	GF	GA	GD	Pts	W	D	L	GF	GA	GD	W	D	L	GF	GA	GD
34	10	6	18	51	64	−13	36	5	2	10	26	28	−2	5	4	8	25	36	−11

Source: DFB

==== Results by round ====
Round	1	2	3	4	5	6	7	8	9	10	11	12	13	14	15	16	17	18	19	20	21	22	23	24	25	26	27	28	29	30	31	32	33	34
Ground	A	H	A	H	A	H	A	H	A	H	A	H	H	A	H	A	H	H	A	H	A	H	A	H	A	H	A	H	A	A	H	A	H	A
Result	D	D	W	L	W	L	D	W	W	L	L	W	W	L	L	L	L	W	W	L	L	W	L	L	D	L	D	L	W	L	L	L	D	L
Position	8	10	9	10	8	9	10	8	5	9	11	8	7	7	9	10	11	10	8	11	11	9	11	11	11	11	11	12	12	12	12	12	12	13

Source: DFB
A = Away; H = Home; W = Win; D = Draw; L = Loss

==== Matches ====
The league fixtures were announced on 17 June 2022.

6 August 2022 1	VfL Wolfsburg	2–2	Werder Bremen	Wolfsburg
15:30 CEST (UTC+2)	L. Nmecha 11', (yellow card) 90+3'; Van de Ven (yellow card) 52'; Guilavogui 84'	Report	Füllkrug 21'; Bittencourt 23'; Weiser (yellow card) 56'; Pieper (yellow card) 58'	Stadium: Volkswagen Arena; Attendance: 28,015; Referee: Sascha Stegemann

13 August 2022 2	Werder Bremen	2–2	VfB Stuttgart	Bremen
15:30 CEST (UTC+2)	Füllkrug 4'; Friedl (yellow card) 16'; Bittencourt (yellow card) 71'; Stark (yellow card) 83'; Ducksch (yellow card) 89'; Burke 90+5'	Report	Endo 38'; Kalajdžić (yellow card) 59'; Ito (yellow card) 71'; Silas 77'	Stadium: Weserstadion; Attendance: 41,000; Referee: Robert Hartmann

20 August 2022 3	Borussia Dortmund	2–3	Werder Bremen	Dortmund
15:30 CEST (UTC+2)	Modeste (yellow card) 39'; Can (yellow card) 42'; Brandt 45+2'; Guerreiro 77'; Wolf (yellow card) 83'; Reus (yellow card) 90+1'	Report	Füllkrug (yellow card) 29'; Buchanan 89'; Schmidt 90+3'; Burke 90+5'	Stadium: Signal Iduna Park; Attendance: 81,365; Referee: Florian Badstübner

28 August 2022 4	Werder Bremen	3–4	Eintracht Frankfurt	Bremen
17:30 CEST (UTC+2)	Jung 14'; Bittencourt 17'; Pieper (yellow card) 33'; Füllkrug 90+2'	Report	Götze 2'; Kolo Muani 32'; Lindstrøm 39'; Sow 48', (yellow card) 90+3'; Trapp (yellow card) 75'; Knauff (yellow card) 90+6'	Stadium: Weserstadion; Attendance: 41,000; Referee: Patrick Ittrich

3 September 2022 5	VfL Bochum	0–2	Werder Bremen	Bochum
15:30 CEST (UTC+2)	Weiser (yellow card) 33'; Pieper (yellow card) 69'	Report	Zoller (yellow card) 39'; Füllkrug 86', 90+2' (pen.); Lampropoulos (yellow card) 90'	Stadium: Vonovia Ruhrstadion; Attendance: 25,800; Referee: Robert Schröder

9 September 2022 6	Werder Bremen	0–1	FC Augsburg	Bremen
20:30 CEST (UTC+2)	Groß (yellow card) 25'; Füllkrug (yellow card) 38'; Schmidt (yellow card) 90+4'; Ducksch (penalty missed) 90+4'; Pieper (yellow card) 90+8'	Report	Rexhbeçaj (yellow card) 32'; Demirović 63'; Bauer (yellow card) 76'; Gouweleeuw (yellow card) 90+3'; Gruezo (yellow card) 90+4'; Gikiewicz (yellow card) 90+6'	Stadium: Weserstadion; Attendance: 41,000; Referee: Martin Petersen

17 September 2022 7	Bayer Leverkusen	1–1	Werder Bremen	Leverkusen
15:30 CEST (UTC+2)	Demirbay (yellow card) 24', (goal) 57'; Tah (yellow card) 90+6'	Report	Schmid (yellow card) 26'; Veljković 82'; Pieper (yellow card) 88'; Weiser (yellow card) 90+6'	Stadium: BayArena; Attendance: 30,210; Referee: Tobias Welz

1 October 2022 8	Werder Bremen	5–1	Borussia Mönchengladbach	Bremen
18:30 CEST (UTC+2)	Füllkrug 5', 13'; Ducksch 8'; Bensebaini 37' (o.g.); Weiser 73'	Report	Koné (yellow card) 39'; Thuram 63'	Stadium: Weserstadion; Attendance: 42,100; Referee: Matthias Jöllenbeck

7 October 2022 9	1899 Hoffenheim	1–2	Werder Bremen	Hoffenheim
20:30 CEST (UTC+2)	Geiger (yellow card) 8'; Dabbur 32'; Vogt (yellow card) 71'; Kabak (yellow card) 90+1'	Report	Ducksch 18'; Gruev (yellow card) 44'; Friedl (yellow card) 45'; Füllkrug 87' (pen.); Bittencourt (yellow card) 90+3'	Stadium: Rhein-Neckar-Arena; Attendance: 25,410; Referee: Benjamin Cortus

15 October 2022 10	Werder Bremen	0–2	Mainz 05	Bremen
15:30 CEST (UTC+2)	Füllkrug (yellow card) 90+2'	Report	Ingvartsen 36'; Hack (yellow card) 45'; Lee 66'; Burkardt (yellow card) 90'	Stadium: Weserstadion; Attendance: 41,000; Referee: Robert Hartmann

22 October 2022 11	SC Freiburg	2–0	Werder Bremen	Freiburg
15:30 CEST (UTC+2)	Höfler (yellow card) 42'; Kübler 56'; Grifo 80' (pen.); Eggestein (yellow card) 90'	Report	Friedl (red card) 14'; Füllkrug (yellow card) 60'; Buchanan (yellow card) 79'	Stadium: Europa-Park Stadion; Attendance: 34,700; Referee: Bastian Dankert

28 October 2022 12	Werder Bremen	1–0	Hertha BSC	Bremen
20:30 CEST (UTC+2)	Weiser (yellow card) 55'; Stark (yellow card) 60'; Füllkrug 85'	Report	Kanga (yellow card) 17'; Lukebakio (yellow card) 44'; Serdar (yellow card) 58'	Stadium: Weserstadion; Attendance: 42,100; Referee: Tobias Reichel

5 November 2022 13	Werder Bremen	2–1	Schalke 04	Bremen
18:30 CEST (UTC+1)	Füllkrug 30'; Veljković (yellow card) 56'; Bittencourt (yellow card) 69'; Ducksch 76'; Pieper (yellow card) 82'	Report	Terodde (yellow card) 43'; Karaman (yellow card) 82'; Drexler 89'	Stadium: Weser-Stadion; Attendance: 42,100; Referee: Felix Brych

8 November 2022 14	Bayern Munich	6–1	Werder Bremen	Munich
20:30 CET (UTC+1)	Musiala 6'; Choupo-Moting (penalty missed) 17'; Gnabry 22', 28', 82'; Goretzka 26'; Tel 84'	Report	Jung 10'	Stadium: Allianz Arena; Attendance: 75,000; Referee: Robert Hartmann

12 November 2022 15	Werder Bremen	1–2	RB Leipzig	Bremen
15:30 CET (UTC+1)	Groß 56'; Stark (yellow card) 81'	Report	Silva (yellow card) 21', (goal) 13'; Haidara (yellow card) 21'; Forsberg (yellow card) 55'; Schlager 71'	Stadium: Weserstadion; Attendance: 41,500; Referee: Matthias Jöllenbeck

21 January 2023 16	1. FC Köln	7–1	Werder Bremen	Cologne
18:30 CET (UTC+1)	Maina 9'; Tigges 15', 21'; Skhiri 30', 54'; Huseinbašić 36'; Friedl 76' (o.g.)	Report	Füllkrug 38'	Stadium: RheinEnergieStadion; Attendance: 50,000; Referee: Robert Schröder

25 January 2023 17	Werder Bremen	1–2	Union Berlin	Bremen
20:30 CET (UTC+1)	Pieper 14'	Report	Haberer 18'; Behrens 46'	Stadium: Weserstadion; Attendance: 41,500; Referee: Bastian Dankert

28 January 2023 18	Werder Bremen	2–1	VfL Wolfsburg	Bremen
15:30 CET (UTC+1)	Füllkrug 24' (pen.), 77'; Stark (yellow card) 39'; Friedl (yellow card) 90+2'; Weiser (yellow card) 90+6'	Report	Baku (yellow card) 67'; Paredes 90', (yellow card) 90+6'; Van de Ven (yellow card) 90+6'	Stadium: Weserstadion; Attendance: 41,000; Referee: Daniel Siebert

5 February 2023 19	VfB Stuttgart	0–2	Werder Bremen	Stuttgart
15:30 CET (UTC+1)	Anton (yellow card) 13'; Nartey (yellow card) 40'	Report	Schmidt (yellow card) 39'; Stage 59', (yellow card) 90'; Pieper (yellow card) 65'; Friedl (yellow card) 69'; Bittencourt (yellow card) 75'; Ducksch 77'	Stadium: Mercedes-Benz Arena; Attendance: 47,700; Referee: Frank Willenborg

11 February 2023 20	Werder Bremen	0–2	Borussia Dortmund	Bremen
15:30 CET (UTC+1)	Bittencourt (yellow card) 35'	Report	Bynoe-Gittens 67'; Brandt 85'	Stadium: Weserstadion; Attendance: 42,100; Referee: Felix Brych

18 February 2023 21	Eintracht Frankfurt	2–0	Werder Bremen	Frankfurt
18:30 CET (UTC+1)	Friedl 8' (pen.); Kolo Muani 52'; Max (yellow card) 57'	Report	Stark (yellow card) 40'	Stadium: Deutsche Bank Park; Attendance: 50,000; Referee: Bastian Dankert

25 February 2023 22	Werder Bremen	3–0	VfL Bochum	Bremen
15:30 CET (UTC+1)	Füllkrug 29'; Schmidt 43'; Friedl (yellow card) 45+1'; Pieper (yellow card) 47'; Ducksch 59'; Jung (yellow card) 80'	Report	Schlotterbeck (yellow card) 45+1'; Hofmann (yellow card) 51'	Stadium: Weserstadion; Attendance: 42,100; Referee: Florian Badstübner

4 March 2023 23	FC Augsburg	2–1	Werder Bremen	Augsburg
15:30 CET (UTC+1)	Beljo 5'; Veiga (yellow card) 28'; Maier 46'; Valentin (yellow card) 64'	Report	Stage 16'; Bittencourt (yellow card) 60'; Groß (yellow card) 61'; Ducksch (yellow card) 90+4'	Stadium: WWK Arena; Attendance: 30,660; Referee: Felix Zwayer

12 March 2023 24	Werder Bremen	2–3	Bayer Leverkusen	Bremen
17:30 CET (UTC+1)	Ducksch 30'; Stark (yellow card) 76'; Schmidt (yellow card) 79'; Füllkrug 86' (pen.)	Report	Bakker 34'; Frimpong 56'; Hložek 83'; Kossounou (yellow card) 89'	Stadium: Weserstadion; Attendance: 41,000; Referee: Deniz Aytekin

17 March 2023 25	Borussia Mönchengladbach	2–2	Werder Bremen	Mönchengladbach
20:30 CEST (UTC+2)	Thuram 48'; Neuhaus 73', (yellow card) 87'	Report	Ducksch 65', 89'; Weiser (yellow card) 81'	Stadium: Borussia-Park; Attendance: 54,042; Referee: Tobias Reichel

2 April 2023 26	Werder Bremen	1–2	1899 Hoffenheim	Bremen
17:30 CEST (UTC+2)	Schmid (yellow card) 29'; Schmidt (yellow card) 54'; Pieper 76'; Bittencourt (yellow card) 89'	Report	Kramarić 50'; Baumgartner 52', (yellow card) 63'; Bebou (yellow card) 57'; Nsoki (yellow card) 82'; Geiger (yellow card) 89'	Stadium: Weserstadion; Attendance: 42,000; Referee: Sascha Stegemann

8 April 2023 27	Mainz 05	2–2	Werder Bremen	Mainz
15:30 CEST (UTC+2)	Onisiwo (yellow card) 65'; Ajorque 85'; Weiper 90+3'	Report	Groß (yellow card) 28'; Stage (yellow card) 42', (goal) 87'; Ducksch (yellow card) 59'; Gruev (yellow card) 81'; Stark (yellow card) 83'; Füllkrug 90+5'	Stadium: Mewa Arena; Attendance: 33,305; Referee: Benjamin Brand

16 April 2023 28	Werder Bremen	1–2	SC Freiburg	Bremen
15:30 CEST (UTC+2)	Groß (yellow card) 11'; Philipp 46'; Stark (yellow card) 73'	Report	Dōan (yellow card) 13'; Eggestein (yellow card) 31'; Sallai (yellow card) 42', (goal) 66'; Höler 71'	Stadium: Weserstadion; Attendance: 42,100; Referee: Florian Badstübner

22 April 2023 29	Hertha BSC	2–4	Werder Bremen	Berlin
15:30 CEST (UTC+2)	Kempf (yellow card) 29'; Ngankam 68'; Lukebakio 79' (pen.); Serdar (yellow card) 90'	Report	Ducksch 6', 27', 51'; Stage (yellow card) 36'; Weiser 63'; Schmid (yellow card) 90+4'	Stadium: Olympiastadion; Attendance: 74,667; Referee: Robert Schröder

29 April 2023 30	Schalke 04	2–1	Werder Bremen	Gelsenkirchen
18:30 CEST (UTC+2)	Krauß (yellow card) 65'; Yoshida (yellow card) 75'; Van den Berg 81', (yellow card) 85'; Drexler 90+2'	Report	Ducksch 18', (yellow card) 68'; Stage (yellow card) 28'; Veljković (yellow card) 57'	Stadium: Veltins-Arena; Attendance: 61,981; Referee: Bastian Dankert

6 May 2023 31	Werder Bremen	1–2	Bayern Munich	Bremen
18:30 CEST (UTC+2)	Pieper (yellow card) 20'; Friedl (yellow card) 31'; Schmidt 87'	Report	Cancelo (yellow card) 15'; Gnabry 62'; Sané 72'	Stadium: Weserstadion; Attendance: 42,100; Referee: Christian Dingert

14 May 2023 32	RB Leipzig	2–1	Werder Bremen	Leipzig
17:30 CEST (UTC+2)	Henrichs (yellow card) 56'; Szoboszlai (yellow card) 73', (goal) 90+6'; Orbán 87'	Report	Stark (yellow card) 22'; Jung (yellow card) 57'; Friedl (yellow card) 58'; Bittencourt 70', (yellow card) 73'	Stadium: Red Bull Arena; Attendance: 47,069; Referee: Florian Badstübner

20 May 2023 33	Werder Bremen	1–1	1. FC Köln	Bremen
15:30 CEST (UTC+2)	Weiser (yellow card) 27'; Bittencourt (yellow card) 33'; Schmid 73'; Stage (yellow card) 79'; Buchanan (yellow card) 82'	Report	Ljubičić (yellow card) 12'; Tigges 36'; Hector (yellow card) 89'	Stadium: Weserstadion; Attendance: 41,846; Referee: Robert Hartmann

27 May 2023 34	Union Berlin	1–0	Werder Bremen	Berlin
15:30 CEST (UTC+2)	Laïdouni (yellow card) 45'; Khedira 81'	Report	Philipp (yellow card) 49'; Pavlenka (yellow card) 68'; Bittencourt (yellow card) 71'	Stadium: Stadion An der Alten Försterei; Attendance: 22,012; Referee: Patrick Ittrich

=== DFB-Pokal ===
1 August 2022 First round	FC Energie Cottbus	1–2	Werder Bremen	Cottbus
18:01 CEST (UTC+2)	Heike 79'	Report	Schmid 43'; Pieper (yellow card) 72'; Weiser 73'	Stadium: Stadion der Freundschaft; Attendance: 20,078; Referee: Daniel Siebert

19 October 2022 Second round	SC Paderborn	2–2 (a.e.t.) (5–4 p)	Werder Bremen	Paderborn
18:00 CEST (UTC+2)	Platte 22'; Conteh 42'; Pieringer (yellow card) 85'; Rohr (yellow card) 90'; Heuer (yellow card) 114'	Report	Bittencourt 65'; Weiser (yellow card) 68', (goal) 84'; Schmidt (yellow card) 95'; Füllkrug (yellow card) 104'	Stadium: Home Deluxe Arena; Attendance: 15,000; Referee: Frank Willenborg
	Penalties
	Leipertz (penalty scored); Justvan (penalty scored); Muslija (penalty scored); Srbeny (penalty scored); Tachie (penalty scored)		(penalty scored) Füllkrug; (penalty scored) Veljković; (penalty scored) Schmidt; (penalty scored) Gruev; (penalty missed) Bittencourt
