= 2024–25 SV Werder Bremen season =

SV Werder Bremen
2024–25 season
- President: Hubertus Hess-Grunewald
- Head coach: Ole Werner
- Stadium: Weserstadion
- Bundesliga: 8th
- DFB-Pokal: Quarter-finals
- Top goalscorer: League: Jens Stage (10); All: Jens Stage (10)
- Highest home attendance: 42,100 (12 times)
- Lowest home attendance: 39,350 (twice)
- Average home league attendance: 41,519
- Biggest win: 4–1 (21 December 2024 v. Union Berlin)
- Biggest defeat: 0–5 (21 September 2024 v. Bayern Munich)
Home colours	Away colours	Third colours

The 2024–25 season was SV Werder Bremen's 126th season in existence, and the club's third consecutive season in the Bundesliga. In addition to an 8th place finish in the domestic league, the club also advanced to the Quarterfinals of the DFB-Pokal.

== Players ==
=== Current squad ===
As of 3 February 2025

Note: Flags indicate national team as defined under FIFA eligibility rules; some limited exceptions apply. Players may hold more than one non-FIFA nationality.

No.	Pos.	Nation	Player
1	GK	GER	Michael Zetterer
3	DF	GER	Anthony Jung
4	DF	GER	Niklas Stark (3rd captain)
5	DF	GER	Amos Pieper
6	MF	DEN	Jens Stage
7	FW	GER	Marvin Ducksch
8	DF	GER	Mitchell Weiser
9	FW	POR	André Silva (on loan from RB Leipzig)
10	MF	GER	Leonardo Bittencourt
11	FW	GER	Justin Njinmah
13	DF	SRB	Miloš Veljković (vice-captain)
14	MF	BEL	Senne Lynen
15	FW	SCO	Oliver Burke
17	FW	AUT	Marco Grüll

No.	Pos.	Nation	Player
19	DF	GER	Derrick Köhn (on loan from Galatasaray)
20	MF	AUT	Romano Schmid
22	DF	ARG	Julián Malatini
25	GK	GER	Markus Kolke
26	FW	USA	Joel Imasuen
27	DF	NGR	Felix Agu
28	MF	FRA	Skelly Alvero
29	DF	BFA	Issa Kaboré (on loan from Manchester City)
30	GK	GER	Mio Backhaus
32	DF	AUT	Marco Friedl (captain)
33	FW	GER	Abdenego Nankishi
35	MF	GER	Leon Opitz
42	FW	GER	Keke Topp

=== Players out on loan ===
Note: Flags indicate national team as defined under FIFA eligibility rules; some limited exceptions apply. Players may hold more than one non-FIFA nationality.

No.	Pos.	Nation	Player
—	MF	BEL	Olivier Deman (at Royal Antwerp until 30 June 2025)
—	MF	TOG	Dikeni Salifou (at Austria Klagenfurt until 30 June 2025)
—	MF	GUI	Naby Keïta (at Ferencváros until 30 June 2025)

No.	Pos.	Nation	Player
—	FW	NOR	Isak Hansen-Aarøen (at AaB until 30 June 2025)
—	FW	POL	Dawid Kownacki (at Fortuna Düsseldorf until 30 June 2025)

== Transfers ==
=== In ===
Date	Pos.	Nat.	Name	Club	Fee	Ref.
1 July 2024	FW	(Austria)	Marco Grüll	(Austria) Rapid Wien	Free Transfer	
1 July 2024	GK	(Germany)	Markus Kolke	(Germany) Hansa Rostock	€75k	
1 July 2024	MF	(France)	Skelly Alvero	(France) Lyon	€4.75M	
1 July 2024	FW	(Germany)	Keke Topp	(Germany) Schalke	€2.00M	

=== Out ===
Date	Pos.	Nat.	Name	Club	Fee	Ref.
1 July 2024	FW	(Germany)	Eren Dinkçi	(Germany) Freiburg	€5.00M	
1 July 2024	FW	(Germany)	Nick Woltemade	(Germany) Stuttgart	Free Transfer	
1 July 2024	GK	(Czech Republic)	Jiří Pavlenka	Without Club	Free Transfer	
1 July 2024	GK	(Germany)	Dudu	(Germany) Viktoria Köln	Free Transfer	
1 July 2024	MF	(Germany)	Christian Groß	Retired	N/A	

=== Loans in ===
Date	Pos.	Nat.	Name	Club	Duration	Ref.
30 August 2024	LB	(Germany) (Ghana)	Derrick Köhn	(Turkey) Galatasaray	30 June 2025	
6 January 2025	RB	(Burkina Faso)	Issa Kaboré	(England) Manchester City	30 June 2025	
3 February 2025	FW	(Portugal)	André Silva	(Germany) RB Leipzig	30 June 2025	

=== Loans out ===
Date	Pos.	Nat.	Name	Club	Duration	Ref.
20 August 2024	FW	(Poland)	Dawid Kownacki	(Germany) Fortuna Düsseldorf	30 June 2025	
26 August 2024	CM	(Togo)	Dikeni Salifou	Austria Klagenfurt	30 June 2025	
15 January 2025	CM	(Guinea)	Naby Keïta	(Hungary) Ferencváros	31 December 2025	

== Pre-season and friendlies ==
Win Draw Loss Fixtures

14 July 2024 Friendly	FC Verden 04	0–2	Werder Bremen	Verden an der Aller
14:00 CEST (UTC+2)		Report	Burke 2'; Topp 66'	Stadium: Stadion am Berliner Ring; Attendance: 5,500

20 July 2024 Friendly	Werder Bremen	0–3	Lecce	Zell am Ziller, Austria
15:00 CEST (UTC+2)			Krstović 31', 34'; Rafia 87'	Stadium: Parkstadion Zell am Ziller

26 July 2024 Friendly	Werder Bremen	2–2	Sheffield Wednesday	Zell am Ziller, Austria
14:00 CEST (UTC+2)	Kownacki 31'; Topp 49'	Report	Musaba 83'; Gassama 97'	Stadium: Parkstadion Zell am Ziller; Attendance: 1,800

3 August 2024 Friendly	Coventry City	4–0	Werder Bremen	Coventry, England
16:00 CEST (UTC+2)	Obikwu 7'; Tavares 20', 67'; Betjemann 28'	Report		Stadium: Coventry Building Society Arena; Attendance: 0 (closed doors)

3 August 2024 Friendly	Coventry City	1–2	Werder Bremen	Coventry, England
16:00 CEST (UTC+2)	Rudoni 29'	Report	Topp 5'; Ducksch 82'	Stadium: Coventry Building Society Arena; Attendance: 11,301; Referee: Lewis Smith

10 August 2024 Friendly	Stade Rennes	1–1	Werder Bremen	Rennes, France
14:30 CEST (UTC+2)	Do Marcolino 35'	Report	Malatini 13'	Stadium: Roazhon Park; Attendance: 0 (closed doors); Referee: Thierry Bouille

10 August 2024 Friendly	Stade Rennes	1–0	Werder Bremen	Rennes, France
17:00 CEST (UTC+2)	Bourigeaud 48'	Report		Stadium: Roazhon Park; Referee: Bastien Dechepy

=== In-season ===
5 January 2025 Friendly	Werder Bremen	2–3	Twente	Bremen
15:00 CET (UTC+2)	Alvero 60'; Grüll 68'	Report	Steijn 59' van Wolfswinkel 73', 75'	Stadium: Weserstadion Platz 11; Attendance: 0 (Behind closed doors); Referee: Christoph Kluge

=== Post-season ===
21 May 2025 Friendly	SV Meppen	4–1	Werder Bremen	Meppen
12:00 CET (UTC+2)	L. Zumdieck 46'; Evseev 80'; Schepp 85'; Haritonov 90'	Report	Kasper 48'	Stadium: Hänsch-Arena; Attendance: 5,373; Referee: Julian Meckfessel

22 May 2025 Friendly	Blumenthaler SV	4–6	Werder Bremen	Bremen
12:00 CET (UTC+2)	Look 2', 21'; Schaper 52'; Paeslack 86'	Report	Zetterer 18', 31'; Alvero 28'; Opitz 47', 64'; Kasper 90+1'	Stadium: Burgwall-Stadion

23 May 2025 Friendly	OSC Bremerhaven	1–4	Werder Bremen	Bremen
09:30 CET (UTC+2)	Ley 44'	Report	Malatini 31'; Njinmah 43'; Kasper 52'; Opitz 53'	Stadium: Burgwall-Stadion

== Competitions ==
=== Overall record ===
Competition	First match	Last match	Starting round	Final position	Record							
Competition	First match	Last match	Starting round	Final position	Pld	W	D	L	GF	GA	GD	Win %
Bundesliga	24 August 2024	17 May 2025	Matchday 1	8th	34	14	9	11	54	57	−3	41.18
DFB-Pokal	19 August 2024	25 February 2025	First round	Quarter-finals	4	3	0	1	6	3	+3	75.00
Total					38	17	9	12	60	60	+0	44.74

Last updated: 17 May 2025
Source: Soccerway

=== Bundesliga ===
==== League table ====
Pos	Team	Pld	W	D	L	GF	GA	GD	Pts	Qualification or relegation
6	Mainz 05	34	14	10	10	55	43	+12	52	Qualification for the Conference League play-off round
7	RB Leipzig	34	13	12	9	53	48	+5	51	
8	Werder Bremen	34	14	9	11	54	57	−3	51	
9	VfB Stuttgart	34	14	8	12	64	53	+11	50	Qualification for the Europa League league phase (Note: VfB Stuttgart qualified for the Europa League league phase by winning the 2024–25 DFB-Pokal.)
10	Borussia Mönchengladbach	34	13	6	15	55	57	−2	45	

Source: Bundesliga
Rules for classification: 1) Points; 2) Goal difference; 3) Goals scored; 4) Head-to-head results; 5) Head-to-head away goals scored; 6) Away goals scored; 7) Play-off.
(Rules 4–6 only apply after home and away matches have been played between the tied teams.)

==== Results summary ====
Overall								Home						Away					
Pld	W	D	L	GF	GA	GD	Pts	W	D	L	GF	GA	GD	W	D	L	GF	GA	GD
34	14	9	11	54	57	−3	51	6	6	6	21	26	−5	8	3	5	33	31	+2

Last updated: 17 May 2025.
Source: DFB

==== Results by round ====
Round	1	2	3	4	5	6	7	8	9	10	11	12	13	14	15	16	17	18	19	20	21	22	23	24	25	26	27	28	29	30	31	32	33	34
Ground	A	H	A	H	A	H	A	H	A	H	A	H	A	A	H	A	H	H	A	H	A	H	A	H	A	H	A	H	A	H	H	A	H	A
Result	D	D	W	L	W	L	W	D	L	W	L	D	W	W	W	L	D	L	D	W	L	L	L	L	W	L	W	W	W	W	D	D	D	W
Position	8	13	8	11	10	11	8	8	10	8	10	12	10	9	7	9	9	9	9	8	9	10	12	12	11	12	11	10	9	8	8	8	9	8

Updated to match(es) played on 17 May 2025. Source: DFB
A = Away; H = Home; W = Win; D = Draw; L = Loss

==== Matches ====
24 August 2024 1	FC Augsburg	2–2	Werder Bremen	Augsburg
15:30 CEST (UTC+2)	Rexhbeçaj 16' (Tietz); Essende 35' (Breithaupt) (yellow card) 90+3'; Engels (yellow card) 55'; Gouweleeuw (yellow card) 90+3'	Report	Agu 12' (Weiser); Njinmah 58' (Weiser); Grüll (yellow card) 90+5'	Stadium: WWK Arena; Attendance: 30,660; Referee: Sascha Stegemann

31 August 2024 2	Werder Bremen	0–0	Borussia Dortmund	Bremen
15:30 CEST (UTC+2)	Weiser (yellow card) 42'; Friedl (yellow card) 60'	Report	Anton (yellow card) 29'; Süle (yellow card) 34'; Ryerson (yellow card) 48'; Schlotterbeck (yellow card) 53' (yellow-red card) 73'; Bensebaini (yellow card) 85'; Groß (yellow card) 90+1'	Stadium: Weserstadion; Attendance: 42,100; Referee: Robert Hartmann

15 September 2024 3	Mainz 05	1–2	Werder Bremen	Mainz
17:30 CEST (UTC+2)	Lee 27'; Caci (yellow card) 45'; Kohr (yellow card) 45+1'; Mwene (yellow card) 66'	Report	Ducksch 8' (pen.); Friedl (red card) 60'; Zetterer (yellow card) 60'; Köhn 69' (Schmid)	Stadium: Mewa Arena; Attendance: 32,000; Referee: Benjamin Brand

21 September 2024 4	Werder Bremen	0–5	Bayern Munich	Bremen
15:30 CEST (UTC+2)		Report	Olise 23' (Kane) 60'; Musiala 32' (Olise); Laimer (yellow card) 38'; Kane 57' (Olise); Gnabry 65' (Kane); Pavlović (yellow card) 68'; Upamecano (yellow card) 77'	Stadium: Weserstadion; Attendance: 42,100; Referee: Bastian Dankert

29 September 2024 5	TSG Hoffenheim	3–4	Werder Bremen	Sinsheim
17:30 CEST (UTC+2)	Bülter 5' (Berisha) 8' (Tohumcu); Tohumcu (yellow card) 10'; Hložek 12'; Nsoki (red card) 18'; Stach (yellow card) 78'; Drexler (yellow card) 90+3'	Report	Malatini 21' (Stark); Köhn (yellow card) 22'; Stage 26' (Ducksch) 39' 49' (Weiser) (yellow card) 73'	Stadium: PreZero Arena; Attendance: 26,018; Referee: Tobias Reichel

5 October 2024 6	Werder Bremen	0–1	SC Freiburg	Bremen
15:30 CEST (UTC+2)	Malatini (yellow card) 90+4'	Report	Eggestein (yellow card) 36'; Dōan 75' (Grifo)	Stadium: Weserstadion; Attendance: 41,200; Referee: Tobias Welz

20 October 2024 7	VfL Wolfsburg	2–4	Werder Bremen	Wolfsburg
17:30 CEST (UTC+2)	Tiago Tomás 19'; Arnold (yellow card) 42'; Wimmer (red card) 68'; Mæhle 79'	Report	Weiser 45+5' (Ducksch); Agu 51'; Ducksch 67' (Weiser); Grüll 72' (Ducksch); Deman (yellow card) 87'	Stadium: Volkswagen Arena; Attendance: 28,917; Referee: Daniel Schlager

26 October 2024 8	Werder Bremen	2–2	Bayer Leverkusen	Bremen
18:30 CET (UTC+1)	Weiser (yellow card) 50'; Ducksch 74' (Malatini); Schmid 90' (Njinmah)	Report	Boniface 30' (Frimpong); Agu 77' (o.g.); Hincapié (yellow card) 88'	Stadium: Weserstadion; Attendance: 42,100; Referee: Florian Badstübner

3 November 2024 9	Borussia Mönchengladbach	4–1	Werder Bremen	Mönchengladbach
17:30 CET (UTC+1)	Pléa 11' (Kleindienst); Friedl 12' (o.g.); Honorat 45' (Kleindienst); Stöger 66' (Kleindienst); Itakura (yellow card) 79'	Report	Agu (yellow card) 18'; Weiser (yellow card) 22' (yellow-red card) 82'; Lynen (yellow card) 53'; Topp 75' (Ducksch)	Stadium: Borussia-Park; Attendance: 53,042; Referee: Bastian Dankert

9 November 2024 10	Werder Bremen	2–1	Holstein Kiel	Bremen
15:30 CET (UTC+1)	Friedl (yellow card) 25'; Stage (yellow card) 30' (goal) 36'; Lynen (yellow card) 50'; Burke 89' (Topp)	Report	Harres 48' (Geschwill); Ivezić (yellow card) 68'; Knudsen (yellow card) 90+2'	Stadium: Weserstadion; Attendance: 42,100; Referee: Sören Storks

23 November 2024 11	Eintracht Frankfurt	1–0	Werder Bremen	Frankfurt
18:30 CET (UTC+1)	Götze 45' (Ekitiké); Marmoush (yellow card) 56'; Skhiri (yellow card) 90+4'	Report	Köhn (yellow card) 27'; Lynen (yellow card) 54'	Stadium: Deutsche Bank Park; Attendance: 58,000; Referee: Florian Badstübner

30 November 2024 12	Werder Bremen	2–2	VfB Stuttgart	Bremen
15:30 CET (UTC+1)	Njinmah 6' (Ducksch); Stage 77'; Ducksch (yellow card) 87'	Report	Demirović 20' (Mittelstädt) 85' (Stiller); Stiller (yellow card) 54'	Stadium: Weserstadion; Attendance: 42,100; Referee: Harm Osmers

7 December 2024 13	VfL Bochum	0–1	Werder Bremen	Bochum
15:30 CET (UTC+1)	Wittek (yellow card) 29'	Report	Lynen (yellow card) 27'; Stage 56' (Ducksch)	Stadium: Vonovia-Ruhrstadion; Attendance: 26,000; Referee: Felix Brych

14 December 2024 14	FC St. Pauli	0–2	Werder Bremen	Hamburg
18:30 CET (UTC+1)	Sinani (yellow card) 65'; Smith (yellow card) 67'	Report	Stark (yellow card) 8'; Friedl (yellow card) 12'; Köhn 24' (Stage); Stage (yellow card) 43'; Ducksch 54' (Weiser)	Stadium: Millerntor-Stadion; Attendance: 29,546; Referee: Robert Hartmann

21 December 2024 15	Werder Bremen	4–1	Union Berlin	Bremen
15:30 CET (UTC+1)	Grüll 13' (Schmid) 17' (Köhn); Friedl (yellow card) 19'; Weiser 45' (Köhn); Stage 87' (Ducksch); Burke (yellow card) 90+4'	Report	Doekhi (yellow card) 5'; Schäfer 23' (Rothe); Khedira (yellow card) 45'	Stadium: Weserstadion; Attendance: 42,100; Referee: Florian Exner

12 January 2025 16	RB Leipzig	4–2	Werder Bremen	Leipzig
15:30 CET (UTC+1)	Simons 23' (Openda) 35' (Vermeeren); Šeško 47'; Haidara (yellow card) 82'; Baumgartner	Report	Friedl (yellow card) 11'; Weiser 26' (Grüll); Burke 90+3'	Stadium: Red Bull Arena; Attendance: 47,187; Referee: Tobias Reichel

15 January 2025 17	Werder Bremen	3–3	1. FC Heidenheim	Bremen
20:30 CET (UTC+1)	Grüll 1' (Schmid) 79' (Stage); Ducksch 56' (yellow card) 67'; Lynen (yellow card) 54'; Stage (yellow card) 90+4'; Stark (yellow card) 90+4'; Alvero (yellow card) 90+4'	Report	Kerber (yellow card) 23' (goal) 61' (Zivzivadze); Schöppner 30'; Traoré (yellow card) 64'; Mainka (yellow card) 71'; Scienza 90+5'	Stadium: Weserstadion; Attendance: 39,350; Referee: Matthias Jöllenbeck

19 January 2025 18	Werder Bremen	0–2	FC Augsburg	Bremen
17:30 CET (UTC+1)	Ducksch (yellow card) 45+1'	Report	Essende 5' 45+1' (Giannoulis); Zesiger (yellow card) 71'; Rexhbeçaj (yellow card) 78'	Stadium: Weserstadion; Attendance: 39,350; Referee: Benjamin Brand

25 January 2025 19	Borussia Dortmund	2–2	Werder Bremen	Dortmund
15:30 CET (UTC+1)	Ryerson (yellow card) 10'; Schlotterbeck (red card) 21'; Guirassy 28' (Brandt); Friedl 51' (o.g.)	Report	Bittencourt (yellow card) 62' (goal) 64' (Veljković); Ducksch 72' (Stage); Njinmah (yellow card) 79'; Stage (yellow card) 87'; Friedl (yellow card) 89'	Stadium: Signal Iduna Park; Attendance: 81,365; Referee: Christian Dingert

31 January 2025 20	Werder Bremen	1–0	Mainz 05	Bremen
20:30 CET (UTC+1)	Ducksch (penalty missed) 12'; Bittencourt 14'; Friedl (yellow card) 26' (yellow-red card) 90+4'; Stark (yellow card) 42' (yellow-red card) 90+3'; Schmid (yellow card) 78'; Zetterer (yellow card) 90+1'; Lynen (yellow card) 90+2'; Weiser (yellow card) 90+8'	Report	Zentner (yellow card) 10'; Caci (yellow card) 44'; Lee Jae-sung (yellow card) 80'	Stadium: Weserstadion; Attendance: 42,100; Referee: Martin Petersen

7 February 2025 21	Bayern Munich	3–0	Werder Bremen	Munich
20:30 CET (UTC+1)	Kane 56' (pen.) 90+7' (pen.); Sané 82' (Laimer); Goretzka (yellow card) 85'	Report	Jung (yellow card) 54'; Weiser (yellow card) 54'; Silva (yellow card) 62'	Stadium: Allianz Arena; Attendance: 75,000; Referee: Sören Storks

16 February 2025 22	Werder Bremen	1–3	TSG Hoffenheim	Bremen
13:30 CET (UTC+1)	Nsoki 7' (o.g.); Schmid (yellow card) 38'; Burke (yellow card) 90+1'	Report	Stach 28' (Kramarić); Bischof 44' (Becker); Orban (yellow card) 50' (goal) 63' (Kramarić); Arthur Chaves (yellow card) 56'; Yardımcı (yellow card) 85'	Stadium: Weserstadion; Referee: Frank Willenborg

21 February 2025 23	SC Freiburg	5–0	Werder Bremen	Freiburg im Breisgau
20:30 CET (UTC+1)	Sildillia 15'; Eggestein (yellow card) 21'; Grifo 33' 57' (Höler); Ginter (yellow card) 34'; Röhl (yellow card) 62'; Dōan 76' (Dinkçi) 90+2' (Beste)	Report	André Silva (penalty missed) '39	Stadium: Europa-Park Stadion; Attendance: 34,700; Referee: Max Burda

1 March 2025 24	Werder Bremen	1–2	VfL Wolfsburg	Bremen
15:30 CET (UTC+1)	Burke (yellow card) 70'; Weiser 90' (Stage); Veljković (yellow card) 90+1'	Report	Wimmer 6' (Skov Olsen) 48' (Amoura)	Stadium: Weserstadion; Attendance: 41,152; Referee: Felix Brych

8 March 2025 25	Leverkusen	0–2	Werder Bremen	Leverkusen
15:30 CET (UTC+1)	Schick (yellow card) 21'; Adli (yellow card) 88'; Palacios (yellow card) 90+7'; Aleix García (yellow card) 90+8'	Report	Schmid 7' (Stage); Lynen (yellow card) 18'; Weiser (yellow card) 52'; Burke (yellow card) 69'; Stage (yellow card) 72'; Njinmah 90+4' (Topp)	Stadium: BayArena; Referee: Tobias Welz

15 March 2025 26	Werder Bremen	2–4	Borussia Mönchengladbach	Bremen
15:30 CET (UTC+1)	Lynen (yellow card) 21'; Schimd 38'; André Silva 45+1' (pen.)	Report	Kleindienst (yellow card) 6' (yellow-red card) 90+1' (goal) 81' (Pléa); Pléa 7' (pen.) 28' 81' (Hack)	Stadium: Weserstadion; Attendance: 42,100; Referee: Timo Gerach

29 March 2025 27	Holstein Kiel	0–3	Werder Bremen	Kiel
15:30 CET (UTC+1)	Rosenboom (yellow card) 16'; Remberg (yellow card) 24'; Ivezić (yellow card) 26'; Bernhardsson (yellow card) 52'	Report	Ducksch 25'; Agu 59'; Stage (yellow card) 82'; Grüll 90+3'	Stadium: Holstein-Stadion; Attendance: 15,034; Referee: Sascha Stegemann

5 April 2025 28	Werder Bremen	2–0	Eintracht Frankfurt	Bremen
18:30 CEST (UTC+2)	Burke 28' (Schmid); Pierper (yellow card) 45+1'; Stage (yellow card) 60'; Schmid 84'; Bittencourt (yellow card) 89'	Report	Tuta (yellow card) 34'; Skhiri (yellow card) 81'; Batshuayi (yellow card) 90'	Stadium: Weserstadion; Attendance: 42,100; Referee: Daniel Siebert

13 April 2025 29	VfB Stuttgart	1–2	Werder Bremen	Stuttgart
15:30 CEST (UTC+2)	Stergiou 19' (Stiller); Karazor (yellow card) 40'; Woltemade (yellow card) 49' (yellow-red card) 65'	Report	Weiser (yellow card) 6'; Burke 32' (Weiser) 90' (Bittencourt); Stage (yellow card) 44'	Stadium: MHPArena; Attendance: 60,000; Referee: Daniel Schlager0

19 April 2025 30	Werder Bremen	1–0	Bochum	Bremen
15:30 CEST (UTC+2)	Weiser (yellow card) 27' (goal) 80' (Njinmah); Stark (yellow card) 86'; Lynen (yellow card) 90+6'	Report	Sissoko (yellow card) 34' (yellow-red card) 86'; Mašović (yellow card) 85'; Horn (yellow card) 90+9'	Stadium: Weserstadion; Attendance: 42,100; Referee: Robert Schröder

27 April 2025 31	Werder Bremen	0–0	St. Pauli	Bremen
15:30 CEST (UTC+2)	Bittencourt (yellow card) 82'; Friedl (yellow card) 90'	Report	Saliakas (yellow card) 63'; Metcalfe (yellow card) 89' (yellow-red card) 90+2'	Stadium: Weserstadion; Attendance: Tobias Reichel; Referee: 42,100

3 May 2025 32	Union Berlin	2–2	Werder Bremen	Berlin
13:30 CEST (UTC+2)	Rothe 37' (Trimmel); Vogt (yellow card) 62'; Bénes 83' (Rothe); Querfeld (yellow card) 83'	Report	Stage 2' 15' (Lynen); Pieper (yellow card) 45+1'; Stark (yellow card) 45+4'; Schmid (yellow card) 55'	Stadium: Stadion An der Alten Försterei; Attendance: 22,012; Referee: Sören Storks

10 May 2025 33	Werder Bremen	0–0	RB Leipzig	Bremen
13:30 CEST (UTC+2)	Friedl (yellow card) 13'	Report	Klostermann (yellow card) 2'; Vermeeren (yellow card) 33'; Nedeljković (yellow card) 77'	Stadium: Weserstadion; Attendance: 41,000; Referee: Bastian Dankert

17 May 2025 34	Heidenheim	1–4	Werder Bremen	Heidenheim
13:30 CEST (UTC+2)	Traoré (yellow card) 39'; Niehues (yellow card) 66'; Kerber 80' (Léo Scienza); Léo Scienza (yellow card) 83'	Report	Schmid 14' (pen.); Stage 33' (Ducksch) (yellow card) 55'; Ducksch 66' (Weiser); Pieper (yellow card) 84'; Topp 86'	Stadium: Voith-Arena; Attendance: 15,000; Referee: Tobias Welz

=== DFB-Pokal ===
19 August 2024 First round	Energie Cottbus	1–3	Werder Bremen	Cottbus
18:00 CEST (UTC+2)	Pronichev (yellow card) 53'; Rorig 70'; Kusić (yellow card) 71'; Hajrulla (red card) 78'	Report	Topp 32' (Schmid) 37' 55' (Ducksch); Stark (yellow card) 46'; Njinmah (yellow card) 77'	Stadium: Stadion der Freundschaft; Attendance: 20,524; Referee: Harm Osmers

30 October 2024 Second round	SC Paderborn	0–1	Werder Bremen	Paderborn
18:00 CET (UTC+1)	Michel (yellow card) 84'	Report	Ducksch 30'; Njinmah (yellow card) 81'; Malatini (yellow card) 90'; Bittencourt (yellow card) 90+5'	Stadium: Home Deluxe Arena; Attendance: 15,000; Referee: Max Burda

3 December 2024 Round of 16	Werder Bremen	1–0	Darmstadt 98	Bremen
20:45 CET (UTC+1)	Stark (yellow card) 22'; Zetterer (yellow card) 34'; Weiser (yellow card) 54'; Ducksch (yellow card) 73'; Jung 90+4' (Ducksch)	Report	Maglica (yellow card) 36'; Guille Bueno (yellow card) 90+3'	Stadium: Weserstadion; Attendance: 42,100; Referee: Martin Petersen

25 February 2025 Quarter-finals	Arminia Bielefeld	2–1	Werder Bremen	Bielefeld
20:45 CET (UTC+1)	Wörl 35'; Malatini 41' (o.g.); Felix (yellow card) 46'	Report	Weiser (yellow card) 32'; Bittencourt (yellow card) 53'; Burke; Malatini (yellow card) 68'	Stadium: SchücoArena; Attendance: 26,311; Referee: Robert Hartmann

== Statistics ==
=== Appearances and goals ===
No.	Pos	Nat	Player	Total		Bundesliga		DFB Pokal	
No.	Pos	Nat	Player	Apps	Goals	Apps	Goals	Apps	Goals
1	GK	(Germany) GER	Michael Zetterer	35	0	34	0	1	0
2	MF	(Belgium) BEL	Olivier Deman	11	0	0+9	0	0+2	0
3	DF	(Germany) GER	Anthony Jung	32	1	20+8	0	2+2	1
4	DF	(Germany) GER	Niklas Stark	29	0	25+1	0	3	0
5	DF	(Germany) GER	Amos Pieper	24	0	16+7	0	0+1	0
6	MF	(Denmark) DEN	Jens Stage	31	10	26+2	10	3	0
7	FW	(Germany) GER	Marvin Ducksch	36	9	30+2	8	4	1
8	DF	(Germany) GER	Mitchell Weiser	36	5	32	5	4	0
9	FW	(Portugal) POR	André Silva	8	1	4+3	1	1	0
10	MF	(Germany) GER	Leonardo Bittencourt	30	2	10+16	2	1+3	0
11	FW	(Germany) GER	Justin Njinmah	29	3	10+15	3	0+4	0
13	DF	(Serbia) SRB	Miloš Veljković	17	0	11+3	0	2+1	0
14	MF	(Belgium) BEL	Senne Lynen	34	0	30	0	4	0
15	FW	(Scotland) SCO	Oliver Burke	26	6	9+15	5	0+2	1
17	FW	(Austria) AUT	Marco Grüll	33	6	13+16	6	3+1	0
19	DF	(Germany) GER	Derrick Köhn	30	2	14+13	2	3	0
20	MF	(Austria) AUT	Romano Schmid	35	5	32	5	3	0
22	DF	(Argentina) ARG	Julián Malatini	12	1	5+5	1	2	0
27	DF	(Germany) GER	Felix Agu	25	3	21+1	3	1+2	0
28	MF	(France) FRA	Skelly Alvero	12	0	1+10	0	1	0
29	DF	(Burkina Faso) BFA	Issa Kaboré	8	0	3+5	0	0	0
32	MF	(Austria) AUT	Marco Friedl	29	0	25+1	0	3	0
42	FW	(Germany) GER	Keke Topp	20	5	1+18	2	1	3
Players away from the club on loan:
Players who left Werder Bremen during the season:

=== Goalscorers ===
Rank	Pos.	Nat.	No.	Player	Bundesliga	DFB-Pokal	Total
1	MF	(Denmark)	6	Jens Stage	10	0	10
2	FW	(Germany)	7	Marvin Ducksch	8	1	9
3	FW	(Austria)	17	Marco Grüll	6	0	6
3	FW	(Scotland)	15	Oliver Burke	5	1	6
5	DF	(Germany)	8	Mitchell Weiser	5	0	5
5	MF	(Austria)	20	Romano Schmid	5	0	5
5	FW	(Germany)	42	Keke Topp	2	3	5
8	FW	(Germany)	11	Justin Njinmah	3	0	3
8	DF	(Germany)	27	Felix Agu	3	0	3
10	DF	(Germany)	19	Derrick Köhn	2	0	2
10	MF	(Germany)	10	Leonardo Bittencourt	2	0	2
11	DF	(Argentina)	22	Julián Malatini	1	0	1
11	DF	(Germany)	3	Anthony Jung	0	1	1
11	FW	(Portugal)	9	André Silva	1	0	1
Opponent's own goal(s)					1	0	1
Total					54	6	60

=== Assists ===
Rank	Pos.	Nat.	No.	Player	Bundesliga	DFB-Pokal	Total
1	FW	(Germany)	7	Marvin Ducksch	9	2	11
2	DF	(Germany)	8	Mitchell Weiser	6	0	6
3	MF	(Denmark)	6	Jens Stage	5	0	5
3	MF	(Austria)	20	Romano Schmid	4	1	5
5	DF	(Germany)	19	Derrick Köhn	2	0	2
5	FW	(Germany)	42	Keke Topp	2	0	2
5	FW	(Germany)	11	Justin Njinmah	2	0	2
8	DF	(Germany)	4	Niklas Stark	1	0	1
8	DF	(Argentina)	22	Julián Malatini	1	0	1
8	FW	(Austria)	17	Marco Grüll	1	0	1
8	DF	(Serbia)	13	Miloš Veljković	1	0	1
8	FW	(Portugal)	9	André Silva	0	1	1
8	MF	(Germany)	10	Leonardo Bittencourt	1	0	1
8	MF	(Germany)	14	Senne Lynen	1	0	1
Total					36	4	40

=== Clean sheets ===
Rank	Pos.	Nat.	No.	Player	Bundesliga	DFB-Pokal	Total
1	GK	(Germany)	1	Michael Zetterer	9	2	11
Total					9	2	11

=== Hat-tricks ===
Player	Against	Result	Date	Competition	Ref.
Keke Topp	Energie Cottbus	3–1	19 August 2024	2024-25 DFB-Pokal	
Jens Stage	Hoffenheim	4–3	29 September 2024	2024-25 Bundesliga	

=== Disciplinary record ===
No.	Nat.	Pos.	Player	Bundesliga			DFB-Pokal			Total		
No.	Nat.	Pos.	Player	Yellow card	(yellow card) (yellow-red card)	Red card	Yellow card	(yellow card) (yellow-red card)	Red card	Yellow card	(yellow card) (yellow-red card)	Red card
1	(Germany)	GK	Michael Zetterer	2	0	0	1	0	0	3	0	0
2	(Germany)	MF	Olivier Deman	1	0	0	0	0	0	1	0	0
3	(Germany)	DF	Anthony Jung	1	0	0	0	0	0	1	0	0
4	(Germany)	DF	Niklas Stark	5	1	0	2	0	0	7	0	0
5	(Germany)	DF	Amos Pieper	3	0	0	0	0	0	3	0	0
6	(Denmark)	MF	Jens Stage	10	0	0	0	0	0	10	0	0
7	(Germany)	FW	Marvin Ducksch	3	0	0	1	0	0	4	0	0
8	(Germany)	DF	Mitchell Weiser	8	1	0	2	0	0	10	1	0
9	(Portugal)	FW	André Silva	1	0	0	0	0	0	1	0	0
10	(Germany)	MF	Leonardo Bittencourt	3	0	0	2	0	0	5	0	0
11	(Germany)	FW	Justin Njinmah	1	0	0	2	0	0	3	0	0
13	(Serbia)	DF	Miloš Veljković	1	0	0	0	0	0	1	0	0
14	(Germany)	MF	Senne Lynen	9	0	0	0	0	0	9	0	0
15	(Scotland)	FW	Oliver Burke	4	0	0	0	0	0	4	0	0
17	(Austria)	FW	Marco Grüll	1	0	0	0	0	0	1	0	0
19	(Germany)	DF	Derrick Köhn	2	0	0	0	0	0	2	0	0
20	(Austria)	MF	Romano Schmid	4	0	0	0	0	0	4	0	0
22	(Argentina)	DF	Julián Malatini	1	0	0	2	0	0	3	0	0
27	(Germany)	DF	Felix Agu	1	0	0	1	0	0	2	0	0
28	(France)	MF	Skelly Alvero	1	0	0	0	0	0	1	0	0
32	(Austria)	DF	Marco Friedl	9	1	1	0	0	0	9	1	1
Total				71	3	1	12	0	0	83	1	1

=== Home attendance ===
Competition	Total	Matches	Average
Bundesliga	666,051	16	41,628
DFB-Pokal	40,000	1	40,000
Total	706,051	17	41,532
