= Patrice Čović =

Croatian footballer

Personal information
- Date of birth: 25 June 2007 (age 19)
- Place of birth: Berlin, Germany
- Height: 1.76 m (5 ft 9 in)
- Position: Attacking midfielder

Team information
- Current team: Dynamo Dresden (on loan from Werder Bremen)
- Number: 24

Youth career
- –2015: SC Staaken
- 2015–2024: Hertha BSC
- 2024–2025: Werder Bremen

Senior career*
Years	Team	Apps	(Gls)
2025–	Werder Bremen	16	(1)
2026–	Werder Bremen II	2	(0)
2026–	→ Dynamo Dresden (loan)	0	(0)

International career^{‡}
2023	Croatia U16	2	(0)
2023–2024	Croatia U17	10	(4)
2024–2025	Croatia U18	4	(1)
2024–	Croatia U19	16	(3)
- * Club domestic league appearances and goals as of 30 August 2026 ‡ National team caps and goals as of 8 July 2026

Patrice Čović (born 25 June 2007) is a Croatian professional footballer who plays as an attacking midfielder for 2. Bundesliga club Dynamo Dresden, on loan from Werder Bremen. Born in Germany, he plays for the Croatia national under-19 football team.

== Youth career ==
Čović began his youth career at SC Staaken, before leaving for Hertha BSC in 2015, and would play at Hertha for nine years, captaining many of the club's youth sides playing under his father Ante Čović, eventually leaving for Werder Bremen in 2024. The club's academy director Björn Schierenbeck said on Čović's signing, "Patrice is a very good footballer, a playmaker who also poses a goal threat and has a great understanding of football. We are delighted that a talent like him has chosen to join Werder." In the 2024–25 season, Čović won the under-19 DFB-Pokal.

Čović began training for the first team towards the end of the 2024–25 season, as well as being named a substitute in six Bundesliga matches, with manager Ole Werner saying "I'm optimistic that Patrice will eventually reach the point where he can handle a Bundesliga game if he continues to work like this." In August 2025, Čović signed his first professional contract for Werder Bremen. Čović made his professional senior debut for Bremen in a DFB–Pokal first round fixture against Arminia Bielefeld, starting the game on the left-wing, coming off in the 72nd minute in a 1–0 loss. Čović made his league debut for Bremen the next week, coming on as a substitute in a 4–1 loss to Eintracht Frankfurt, once again on the left wing.

On 1 September 2026, Čović joined 2. Bundesliga club Dynamo Dresden on a season-long loan.

== International career ==
Čović represents Croatia internationally, and has made 10 appearances for the U17s, as well as three appearances for the U19 team. He has scored 4 goals for the under-17s, one against Kosovo, Faroe Islands and one against Turkey in a friendly. He also scored in a group stage match against Denmark in the 2024 UEFA European Under-17 Championship.

== Personal life ==
Čović's father, Ante Čović coached him at Hertha BSC, and was a professional footballer who played for clubs such as VfB Stuttgart and Hertha BSC, and Čović's brother Maurice plays for SV Babelsberg 03.

== Career statistics ==
=== Club ===
As of match played 30 August 2026

Appearances and goals by club, season and competition
Club	Season	League			National cup		Continental		Other		Total	
Club	Season	Division	Apps	Goals	Apps	Goals	Apps	Goals	Apps	Goals	Apps	Goals
Werder Bremen	2025–26	Bundesliga	15	1	1	0	—		—		16	1
Werder Bremen	2026–27	Bundesliga	1	0	0	0	—		—		1	0
Career total			16	1	1	0	0	0	0	0	17	1
