= Michael Zetterer =

German footballer (born 1995)

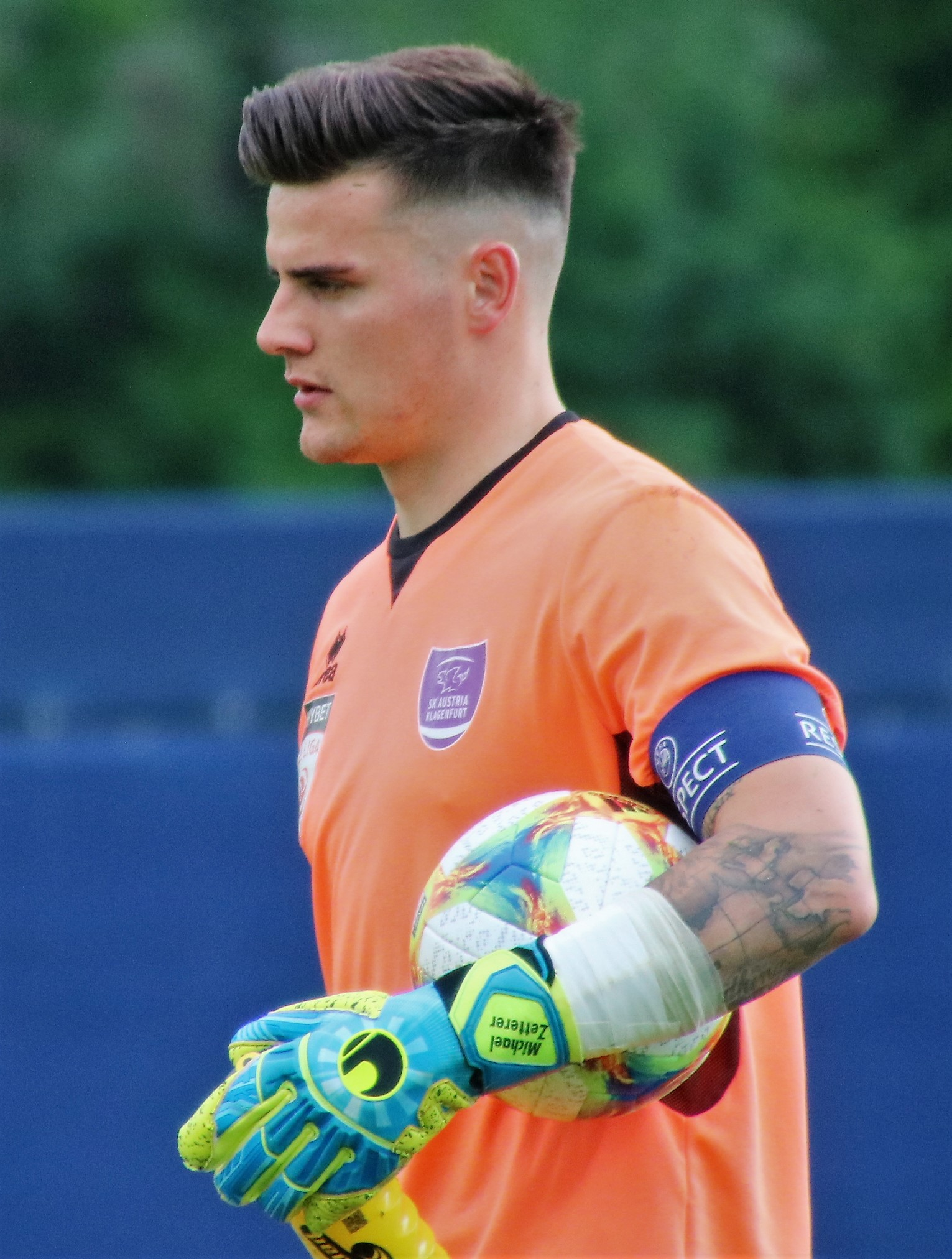
- Zetterer with Austria Klagenfurt in 2019

Personal information
- Date of birth: 12 July 1995 (age 31)
- Place of birth: Munich, Germany
- Height: 1.87 m (6 ft 2 in)
- Position: Goalkeeper

Team information
- Current team: Leeds United
- Number: 16

Youth career
- –2006: DJK Darching
- 2006–2013: SpVgg Unterhaching

Senior career*
Years	Team	Apps	(Gls)
2013–2015	SpVgg Unterhaching	30	(0)
2015–2025	Werder Bremen	74	(0)
2015–2018	Werder Bremen II	31	(0)
2019	→ Austria Klagenfurt (loan)	14	(0)
2019–2021	→ PEC Zwolle (loan)	32	(0)
2025–2026	Eintracht Frankfurt	22	(0)
2026–	Leeds United	0	(0)

International career
2014–2016	Germany U20	4	(0)
2016	Germany U21	1	(0)
- * Club domestic league appearances and goals as of 19:44, 29 August 2026 (UTC)

Michael Zetterer (born 12 July 1995) is a German professional footballer who plays as a goalkeeper for Premier League club Leeds United.

== Club career ==
Zetterer started playing football with local DJK Darching in Valley, Bavaria. At the age of eleven, in 2006, he moved to the youth ranks of SpVgg Unterhaching where he passed through all the youth and the senior's reserve team. In December 2012, he signed a professional contract for three years effective 2013 until 2016.

=== SpVgg Unterhaching ===
For the 2013–14 season, Zetterer first served as reserve goalkeeper behind Korbinian Müller. After Müller had shown weaknesses at set pieces, head coach Manuel Baum promoted Zetterer to the new regular goalkeeper. He made his debut on 1 March 2014, in a 4–2 loss away at Hallescher FC. Although Müller returned once between the sheets, Zetterer started in eleven of the last twelve matches of the season.

In the 2014–15 season, Zetterer remained Unterhaching's regular goalkeeper, the youngest of his kind in the 3. Liga. His performances drew the interest of the Germany national youth football team levels and several Bundesliga clubs.

=== Werder Bremen ===
In January 2015, Zetterer moved to Bundesliga side Werder Bremen. According to media reports, he signed a contract until 2018 and cost a transfer fee of €100,000. He took up the role of second reserve keeper behind Raphael Wolf and Koen Casteels. In the second half of the 2014–2015 season, Zetterer had seven appearances with Werder Bremen's reserve team contributing to its promotion from the fourth tier Regionalliga to the 3. Liga.

With Wolf injured Zetterer was second goalkeeper of the first team for most of the first half of the 2015–16 season. He made his first appearance of the season in the reserve team's 3–2 defeat of Chemnitzer FC on 1 November 2015.

Zetterer was largely kept out of action by two scaphoid fractures he suffered in 2015 and 2016, and resulting complications made a further surgery necessary in November 2017. In July 2018, he agreed a contract extension until 2019 with Werder Bremen.

In February 2019, he joined Austria Klagenfurt on loan.

In June, Zetterer agreed a "long-term" extension with Werder Bremen and a two-year loan move to Eredivisie side PEC Zwolle.

Zetterer's loan to PEC Zwolle was cut short and he again extended his contract in January 2021, after Werder Bremen agreed to loan out Stefanos Kapino.

On 11 September 2022, he made his Bundesliga debut, replacing the injured Jiří Pavlenka in a 1–0 defeat to FC Augsburg.

=== Eintracht Frankfurt ===
On 20 August 2025, Zetterer signed a four-season contract with Eintracht Frankfurt. He made a total of 28 appearances for the club, five of which came in the UEFA Champions League.

=== Leeds United ===
On 29 August 2026, Zetterer signed a three-season contract with Premier League club Leeds United.

== International career ==
In August 2014, Zetterer was nominated for the Germany U20 national team for the first time. Thus far he has earned four caps for them.

== Career statistics ==
As of match played 16 May 2026

Appearances and goals by club, season and competition
Club	Season	League			National cup (Note: Includes DFB-Pokal)		League cup		Europe		Total	
Club	Season	Division	Apps	Goals	Apps	Goals	Apps	Goals	Apps	Goals	Apps	Goals
SpVgg Unterhaching	2012–13	3. Liga	0	0	0	0	—		—		0	0
SpVgg Unterhaching	2013–14	3. Liga	11	0	0	0	—		—		11	0
SpVgg Unterhaching	2014–15	3. Liga	19	0	0	0	—		—		19	0
SpVgg Unterhaching	Total		30	0	0	0	—		—		30	0
SpVgg Unterhaching II	2014–15	Bayernliga Süd	1	0	0	0	—		—		1	0
Werder Bremen II	2014–15	Regionalliga Nord	7	0	—		—		—		7	0
Werder Bremen II	2015–16	3. Liga	1	0	—		—		—		1	0
Werder Bremen II	2016–17	3. Liga	22	0	—		—		—		22	0
Werder Bremen II	Total		30	0	—		—		—		30	0
Werder Bremen	2014–15	Bundesliga	0	0	0	0	—		—		0	0
Werder Bremen	2015–16	Bundesliga	0	0	0	0	—		—		0	0
Werder Bremen	2016–17	Bundesliga	0	0	0	0	—		—		0	0
Werder Bremen	2017–18	Bundesliga	0	0	0	0	—		—		0	0
Werder Bremen	2021–22	2. Bundesliga	11	0	1	0	—		—		12	0
Werder Bremen	2022–23	Bundesliga	2	0	0	0	—		—		2	0
Werder Bremen	2023–24	Bundesliga	27	0	0	0	—		—		27	0
Werder Bremen	2024–25	Bundesliga	34	0	4	0	—		—		38	0
Werder Bremen	2025–26	Bundesliga	0	0	1	0	—		—		1	0
Werder Bremen	Total		74	0	6	0	—		—		80	0
Austria Klagenfurt (loan)	2018–19	Austrian Second League	14	0	0	0	—		—		14	0
PEC Zwolle (loan)	2019–20	Eredivisie	13	0	1	0	—		—		14	0
PEC Zwolle (loan)	2020–21	Eredivisie	19	0	1	0	—		—		20	1
PEC Zwolle (loan)	Total		32	0	2	0	—		—		34	0
Eintracht Frankfurt	2025–26	Bundesliga	22	0	1	0	—		5 (Note: Appearances in UEFA Champions League)	0	28	0
Leeds United	2026–27	Premier League	0	0	0	0	0	0	—		0	0
Career total			203	0	9	0	0	0	5	0	217	0
