= Jens Stage =

Danish footballer (born 1996)

Personal information
- Full name: Jens Dalsgaard Stage
- Date of birth: 8 November 1996 (age 30)
- Place of birth: Højbjerg, Aarhus, Denmark
- Height: 1.87 m (6 ft 2 in)
- Position: Midfielder

Team information
- Current team: Werder Bremen
- Number: 6

Youth career
- ASA
- 2010–2013: Lyseng
- 2013–2014: Brabrand

Senior career*
Years	Team	Apps	(Gls)
2014–2016	Brabrand		
2016–2019	AGF	86	(10)
2019–2022	Copenhagen	76	(15)
2022–	Werder Bremen	119	(26)

International career
2014	Denmark U18	1	(0)
2018–2019	Denmark U21	5	(1)
2021–2024	Denmark	2	(0)
- * Club domestic league appearances and goals as of 17:30, 16 May 2026 (UTC)

Jens Dalsgaard Stage (born 8 November 1996) is a Danish professional footballer who plays as a midfielder for Bundesliga side Werder Bremen.

== Club career ==
=== AGF ===
On 27 January 2016, it was confirmed that Stage had signed a contract with AGF. Previously, he played for Brabrand IF. Before his transfer, he played matches for the reserve team of AGF. He also trained with FC Midtjylland in 2015.

On 8 May 2016, Stage got his professional Superliga debut for AGF, in a match against FC Midtjylland. He started on the bench, replacing Dino Mikanović in the 84th minute. Stage's contract got extended in December 2016 until 2019.

=== Copenhagen ===
On 1 July 2019, FC Copenhagen announced, that they had signed Stage from AGF on a five-year contract, after he had rejected several offers from foreign clubs. Shortly after signing, in mid-July, Stage's apartment in Aarhus was subjected to vandalism and arson. An object was thrown through a window and, according to AGF, was the cause of a "minor fire damage". FC Copenhagen distanced themselves from the vandalism on their official website. AGF offered their assistance to local police, who following the incident began an investigation of the case. According to DR, no major damage was done to the apartment as the fire went out again shortly after it was ignited. AGF's chairman, Jacob Nielsen, stated on AGF's official website that if the perpetrators "are identified and it turns out that the perpetrators have some connection to our fan base, then they will – in addition to a civil sentence – get a lifelong suspension for all AGF's matches".

Stage made his debut for Copenhagen on 14 July 2019 in a 3–2 away victory over OB in the Superliga, where he came on as a substitute in the 69th minute for Robert Skov. He was also a substitute in his second match for the club, before making his first start in the subsequent match away against Horsens.

He made his UEFA Europa League group stage debut on 19 September 2019 in a 1–0 win over Swiss side Lugano.

=== Werder Bremen ===
On 29 June 2022, newly promoted Bundesliga club Werder Bremen confirmed that they had signed Stage. The contract duration was undisclosed. Danish tabloid Ekstra Bladet reported the transfer fee paid to Copenhagen as DKK 45 (€6 million) while various bonuses could send the amount up towards DKK 60 million (€8 million). According to German newspaper Deichstube, the transfer fee was €4 million plus bonuses and Stage signed a four-year contract. On October 10, 2025, Stage played his 100th competitive match for Werder in a 1–0 home win over St. Pauli.

== International career ==
Stage made his debut for the Denmark national team on 15 November 2021 in a World Cup qualifier against Scotland.

== Style of play ==
A versatile player, Stage has been deployed as a full-back, attacking midfielder, central midfielder or forward in his career.

== Career statistics ==
As of match played 22 August 2026

Appearances and goals by club, season and competition
Club	Season	League			National cup (Note: Includes Danish Cup, DFB-Pokal)		Europe		Other		Total	
Club	Season	Division	Apps	Goals	Apps	Goals	Apps	Goals	Apps	Goals	Apps	Goals
AGF	2015–16	Danish Superliga	6	0	0	0	—		—		6	0
AGF	2016–17	Danish Superliga	16	1	4	0	—		4 (Note: Appearances in Danish Superliga relegation play-offs)	0	24	1
AGF	2017–18	Danish Superliga	22	2	2	0	—		5	2	29	4
AGF	2018–19	Danish Superliga	30	6	2	0	—		4	0	36	6
AGF	Total		74	9	8	0	—		13	2	95	11
Copenhagen	2019–20	Danish Superliga	31	5	2	0	15 (Note: Four appearances in UEFA Champions League, eleven appearances and one goal in UEFA Europa League)	1	—		48	6
Copenhagen	2020–21	Danish Superliga	23	5	2	1	3 (Note: Appearances in UEFA Europa League)	0	—		28	6
Copenhagen	2021–22	Danish Superliga	22	5	1	0	12 (Note: Appearances in UEFA Europa Conference League)	4	—		35	9
Copenhagen	Total		76	15	5	1	30	5	—		111	21
Werder Bremen	2022–23	Bundesliga	32	3	2	0	—		—		34	3
Werder Bremen	2023–24	Bundesliga	30	3	1	0	—		—		31	3
Werder Bremen	2024–25	Bundesliga	28	10	3	0	—		—		31	10
Werder Bremen	2025–26	Bundesliga	30	10	0	0	—		—		30	10
Werder Bremen	2026–27	Bundesliga	0	0	1	1	—		—		1	1
Werder Bremen	Total		119	26	7	1	—		—		126	27
Career total			269	50	20	2	30	5	13	2	332	59

== Honours ==
Copenhagen

- Danish Superliga: 2021–22
