= Felix Agu =

Footballer (born 1999)

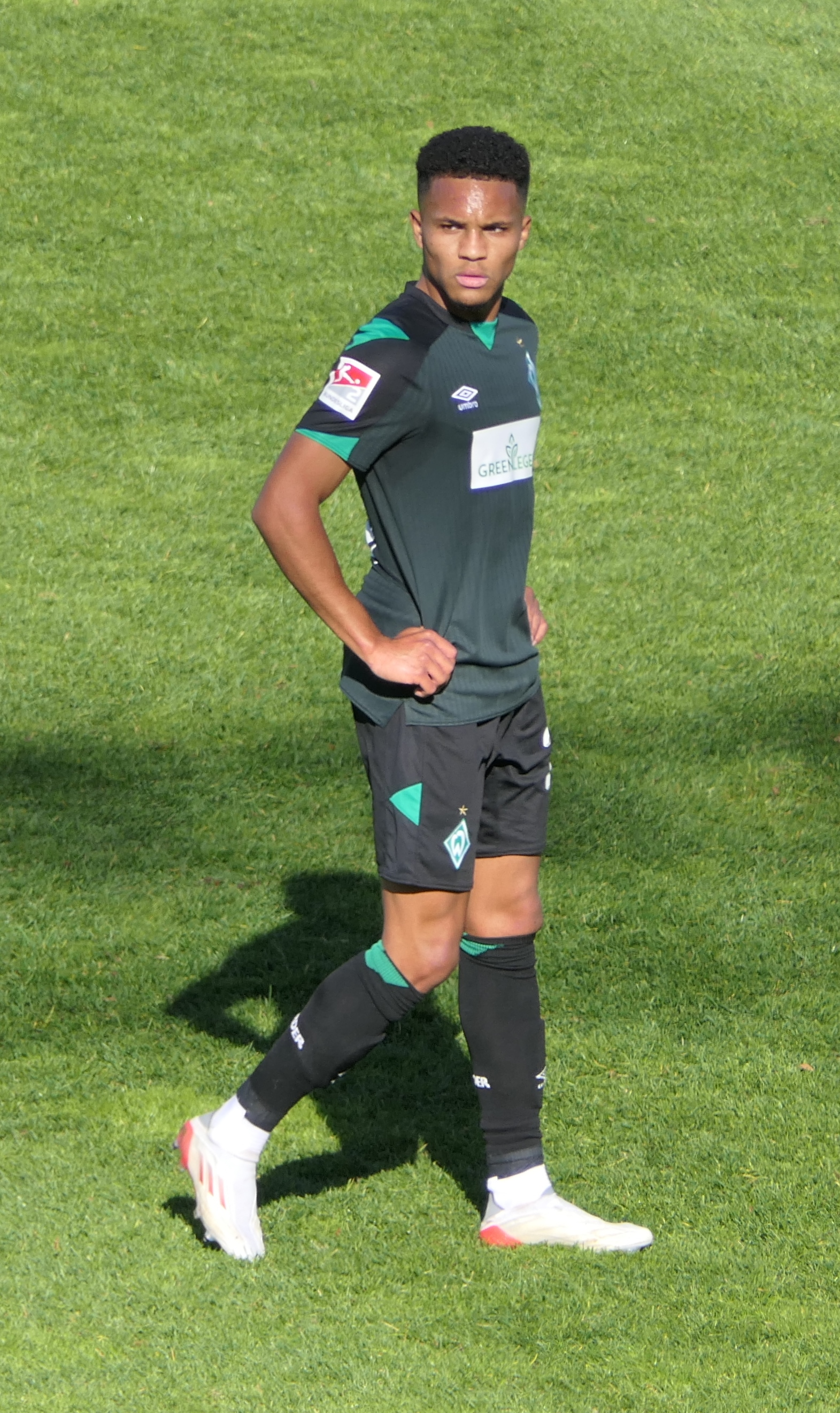
- Agu in 2021 with Werder Bremen

Personal information
- Date of birth: 27 September 1999 (age 27)
- Place of birth: Osnabrück, Germany
- Height: 1.80 m (5 ft 11 in)
- Position: Full-back

Team information
- Current team: Werder Bremen
- Number: 27

Youth career
- –2010: Osnabrücker SC
- 2010–2018: VfL Osnabrück

Senior career*
Years	Team	Apps	(Gls)
2018–2020	VfL Osnabrück	45	(2)
2020–	Werder Bremen	101	(4)

International career^{‡}
2019–2020	Germany U21	2	(0)
2025–	Nigeria	1	(0)
- * Club domestic league appearances and goals as of 12 April 2026 ‡ National team caps and goals as of 18:04, 31 May 2025 (UTC)

Felix Agu (born 27 September 1999) is a professional footballer who plays as a full-back for Werder Bremen. Born in Germany, he plays for the Nigeria national team.

== Club career ==
In late January 2020, media reported that Agu would move to Bundesliga side Werder Bremen for the 2020–21 season having agreed a four-year contract with the club. With his VfL Osnabrück due to run out, he would join on a free transfer. In early February, the move was officially announced.

Agu made his Bundesliga debut in Werder Bremen's 1–1 draw against Bayern Munich on 21 November 2020, being brought on as a substitute in the 66th minute. He played in midfield instead of his usual full-back position. With first-choice left-back Ludwig Augustinsson sidelined through injury, Agu made his first Bundesliga appearance as a starter in a 2–0 win against FC Augsburg on 16 January 2021. He contributed with his first assist and his first goal in the league.

Agu agreed an extension of his contract with Werder Bremen in February 2022.

== International career ==
Born in Germany, Agu is of Nigerian descent. He is a youth international for Germany, having appeared for the U21 side. He was called up to the senior Nigeria national team for the friendly 2025 Unity Cup tournament in May 2025.

== Career statistics ==
=== Club ===
As of match played 12 April 2026

Appearances and goals by club, season and competition
Club	Season	League			DFB-Pokal		Other		Total		Ref.
Club	Season	Division	Apps	Goals	Apps	Goals	Apps	Goals	Apps	Goals	Ref.
VfL Osnabrück	2017–18	3. Liga	2	0	0	0	—		2	0	
VfL Osnabrück	2018–19	3. Liga	15	2	0	0	—		15	2	
VfL Osnabrück	2019–20	2. Bundesliga	28	0	1	0	–		29	0	
VfL Osnabrück	Total		45	2	1	0	0	0	46	2	—
Werder Bremen	2020–21	Bundesliga	15	1	3	1	—		18	2	
Werder Bremen	2021–22	2. Bundesliga	26	0	1	0	—		27	0	
Werder Bremen	2022–23	Bundesliga	3	0	0	0	—		3	0	
Werder Bremen	2023–24	Bundesliga	24	0	0	0	—		24	0	
Werder Bremen	2024–25	Bundesliga	22	3	2	0	—		24	3	
Werder Bremen	2025–26	Bundesliga	11	0	1	0	—		12	0	
Werder Bremen	Total		101	4	7	1	0	0	108	5	—
Career total			146	6	8	1	0	0	154	7	—

=== International ===
As of match played 31 May 2025

Appearances and goals by national team and year
National team	Year	Apps	Goals
Nigeria	2025	1	0
Total		1	0
