= Senne Lynen =

Belgian footballer (born 1999)

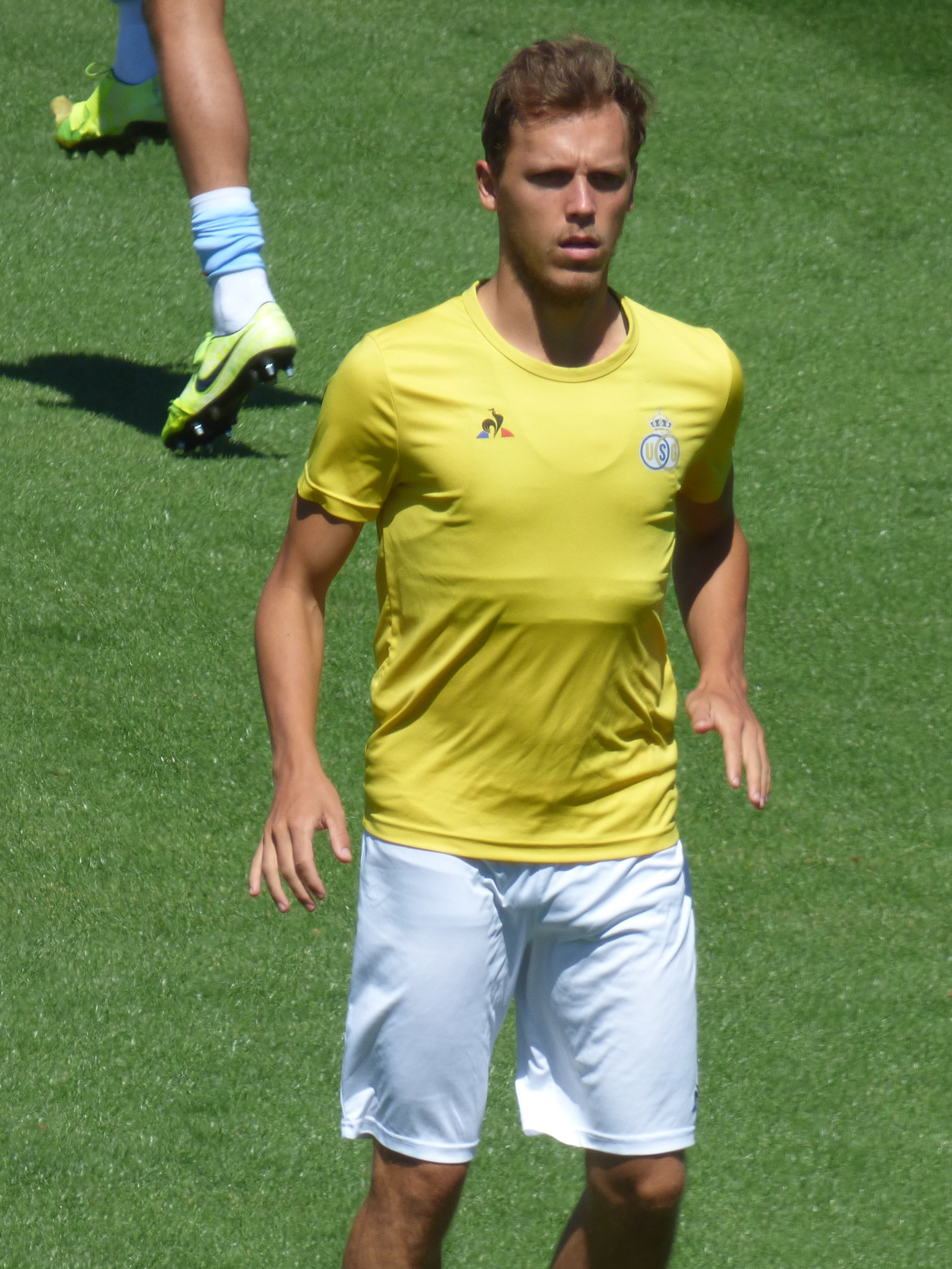
- Lynen in 2020

Personal information
- Full name: Senne Maaike Lynen
- Date of birth: 19 February 1999 (age 27)
- Place of birth: Borsbeek, Belgium
- Height: 1.85 m (6 ft 1 in)
- Position: Defensive midfielder

Team information
- Current team: Werder Bremen
- Number: 14

Youth career
- Borsbeek Sport
- Royal Antwerp
- Westerlo
- Lierse
- Club Brugge

Senior career*
Years	Team	Apps	(Gls)
2017–2018	Club Brugge	0	(0)
2018	→ Telstar (loan)	9	(0)
2018–2020	Telstar	54	(5)
2020–2023	Union Saint-Gilloise	64	(3)
2023–	Werder Bremen	97	(0)

International career
2014	Belgium U15	7	(2)
2014–2015	Belgium U16	6	(0)
2015–2016	Belgium U17	9	(1)
2017–2018	Belgium U19	5	(0)
- * Club domestic league appearances and goals as of 17:30, 31 October 2026 (UTC)

Senne Maaike Lynen (born 19 February 1999) is a Belgian professional footballer who plays as a defensive midfielder for Bundesliga club Werder Bremen.

== Club career ==
Lynen spent his early career with Borsbeek Sport, Royal Antwerp, Westerlo, Lierse and Club Brugge.

Having spent the second half of the 2017–18 season at Eerste Divisie club Telstar on loan from Club Brugge, Lynen made a permanent move to Telstar in 2018, signing a two-year contract.

On 8 August 2023, Lynen signed for Bundesliga club Werder Bremen from Pro League side Union SG. The transfer fee paid to Union SG was reported as €2 million.

== International career ==
Lynen was a Belgian youth international.

== Career statistics ==
As of match played 31 October 2026

Appearances and goals by club, season and competition
Club	Season	League			National cup		Europe		Other		Total	
Club	Season	Division	Apps	Goals	Apps	Goals	Apps	Goals	Apps	Goals	Apps	Goals
Club Brugge	2017–18	Belgian Pro League	—		—		—		—		—	
Telstar (loan)	2017–18	Eerste Divisie	9	0	—		—		2 (Note: Appearance(s) in Eerste Divisie play-offs)	0	11	0
Telstar	2018–19	Eerste Divisie	29	4	1	0	—		—		30	4
Telstar	2019–20	Eerste Divisie	25	1	2	0	—		—		27	1
Telstar	Total		54	5	3	0	0	0	0	0	57	5
Union SG	2020–21	Challenger Pro League	20	1	2	0	—		—		22	1
Union SG	2021–22	Belgian Pro League	10	1	0	0	—		—		10	1
Union SG	2022–23	Belgian Pro League	32	1	4	0	12	1	5 (Note: Appearances in Belgian First Division A championship play-offs)	0	53	2
Union SG	2023–24	Belgian Pro League	2	0	0	0	–		–		2	0
Union SG	Total		64	3	6	0	12	1	5	0	87	4
Werder Bremen	2023–24	Bundesliga	32	0	0	0	—		—		32	0
Werder Bremen	2024–25	Bundesliga	32	0	4	0	—		—		36	0
Werder Bremen	2025–26	Bundesliga	31	0	1	0	—		—		32	0
Werder Bremen	2026–27	Bundesliga	2	0	2	0	—		—		4	0
Werder Bremen	Total		97	0	7	0	0	0	0	0	104	0
Career total			224	8	16	0	12	1	7	0	259	9
