= Keke Topp =

German footballer (born 2004)

Personal information
- Full name: Keke Maximilian Topp
- Date of birth: 25 March 2004 (age 22)
- Place of birth: Gnarrenburg, Germany
- Height: 1.92 m (6 ft 4 in)
- Position: Forward

Team information
- Current team: Werder Bremen
- Number: 9

Youth career
- 2012–2013: TSV Gnarrenburg
- 2013–2021: Werder Bremen
- 2021–2023: Schalke 04

Senior career*
Years	Team	Apps	(Gls)
2021–2024	Schalke 04	27	(5)
2023	Schalke 04 II	5	(1)
2024–	Werder Bremen	39	(3)
2025–	Werder Bremen II	2	(2)

International career^{‡}
2019	Germany U16	2	(1)
2022–2023	Germany U19	11	(7)
2023–	Germany U20	3	(3)
2024–	Germany U21	1	(0)
- * Club domestic league appearances and goals as of 15 March 2026 ‡ National team caps and goals as of 17:58, 5 September 2024 (UTC)

Keke Maximilian Topp (born 25 March 2004) is a German professional footballer who plays as a forward for Bundesliga club Werder Bremen. He has represented Germany internationally at youth level.

== Club career ==
After playing youth football for hometown club TSV Gnarrenburg, he signed for Werder Bremen's academy in summer 2013. In March 2021, it was announced that Topp would join Schalke 04's under-19 team from summer 2021. After six goals in 13 games for the under-19s, he was called up to Schalke's first team for the fixture against FC St. Pauli on 4 December 2021 due to injuries to Simon Terodde and Marius Bülter. He made his debut as a late substitute as Schalke lost 2–1. He made his Bundesliga debut for Schalke in a 2–0 defeat against 1899 Hoffenheim on 9 April 2023.

In June 2024, Werder Bremen announced Topp would return to the club for the 2024–25 Bundesliga season. The undisclosed transfer fee was reported as around €2 million plus bonuses. On January 31, 2026, Topp cored a 94th-minute equalizer in a 1-1 draw against Borussia Mönchengladbach. He suffered an ACL tear in his left knee during a training session in March ruling him out for the remainder of the 2026 season.

== International career ==
Topp made two appearances for the Germany under-16 team in September 2019. He scored four goals in his first two appearances for the Germany under-19 team in the European Championship qualification in September 2022.

== Career statistics ==
As of match played 15 March 2026

Appearances and goals by club, season and competition
Club	Season	League			DFB-Pokal		Total	
Club	Season	Division	Apps	Goals	Apps	Goals	Apps	Goals
Schalke 04	2021–22	2. Bundesliga	1	0	0	0	1	0
Schalke 04	2022–23	Bundesliga	1	0	0	0	1	0
Schalke 04	2023–24	2. Bundesliga	25	5	0	0	25	5
Schalke 04	Total		27	5	0	0	27	5
Schalke 04 II	2023–24	Regionalliga West	5	1	—		5	1
Werder Bremen	2024–25	Bundesliga	19	2	1	3	20	5
Werder Bremen	2025–26	Bundesliga	20	1	1	0	21	1
Werder Bremen	Total		39	3	2	3	41	6
Career total			71	9	2	3	73	12
