= Julián Malatini =

Argentine footballer (born 2001)

Personal information
- Date of birth: 31 May 2001 (age 25)
- Place of birth: General Cabrera, Argentina
- Height: 1.91 m (6 ft 3 in)
- Positions: Centre-back; right-back

Team information
- Current team: FC Cincinnati (on loan from Werder Bremen)
- Number: 22

Youth career
- Unión Deportiva
- Ateneo Vecinos
- 2017–2020: Talleres

Senior career*
Years	Team	Apps	(Gls)
2020–2023	Talleres	33	(1)
2022	Talleres 2	1	(1)
2023	→ Defensa y Justicia (loan)	16	(0)
2023–2024	Defensa y Justicia	0	(0)
2024–	Werder Bremen	32	(2)
2026–	→ FC Cincinnati (loan)	1	(0)
- * Club domestic league appearances and goals as of 21:02, 12 October 2026 (UTC)

Julián Malatini (born 31 May 2001) is an Argentine professional footballer who plays as a centre-back or right-back for Major League Soccer (MLS) club FC Cincinnati, on loan from Bundesliga club Werder Bremen.

== Club career ==
Malatini started out with Unión Deportiva de General Cabrera at the age of five, prior to joining Ateneo Vecinos. He left at the end of 2017 to sign for Talleres, having impressed over a trial period. He made his reserves debut in 2019 against Racing Club, under the guidance of manager Diego Torrentes. He was promoted into their first-team squad towards the end of 2020 under manager Alexander Medina, as the right-back featured in a number of friendlies before the start of the 2020 Copa de la Liga Profesional; he didn't appear in that aforementioned competition, though did make the substitute's bench on six occasions.

After again going unused three times in the subsequent 2021 Copa de la Liga, Malatini's senior debut did arrive on 6 March 2021 during a 1–1 draw away to Sarmiento; he replaced Nahuel Tenaglia after sixty-six minutes.

On 3 January 2023, Malatini joined Defensa y Justicia on loan with an option to make the move permanent. In December 2023, the club announced that they had exercised their right to purchase, the player signing a three-year contract.

On 16 January 2024, Malatini signed for Bundesliga club Werder Bremen. The transfer fee was reported as €2 million. On 27 January, Malatini scored on his debut for Werder Bremen, getting the last goal in a 3–1 win against SC Freiburg in the third minute of injury time, two minutes after having been substituted on.

On 3 September 2026, Malatini was loaned to Major League Soccer side FC Cincinnati through June 2027.

== International career ==
In 2019, Malatini was selected on the preliminary squad list for the Argentina U18s' trip to Spain for the COTIF Tournament; though didn't make the final cut. He had already received a call-up from the U18s a year prior. December 2020 saw him receive a call to train with the U20s; just over a week after he had signed his first professional contract with Talleres.

== Career statistics ==
As of match played 10 October 2026

Appearances and goals by club, season and competition
Club	Season	League			National cup (Note: Includes Copa Argentina and DFB-Pokal)		League cup (Note: Includes Copa de la Liga Profesional)		Continental		Other		Total	
Club	Season	Division	Apps	Goals	Apps	Goals	Apps	Goals	Apps	Goals	Apps	Goals	Apps	Goals
Talleres	2020–21	Liga Profesional de Fútbol	—		2	0	—		—		—		2	0
Talleres	2021	Liga Profesional de Fútbol	19	1	—		3	0	2 (Note: Appearances in Copa Sudamericana)	0	—		24	1
Talleres	2022	Liga Profesional de Fútbol	14	0	—		1	0	2 (Note: Appearances in Copa Libertadores)	0	—		17	0
Talleres	Total		33	1	2	0	4	0	4	0	—		43	0
Talleres (C)	2022	Torneo de Reserva	1	1	—		—		—		—		1	1
Defensa y Justicia (loan)	2023	Liga Profesional de Fútbol	16	0	3	0	10	0	11	0	—		40	0
Werder Bremen	2023–24	Bundesliga	11	1	0	0	—		—		—		11	1
Werder Bremen	2024–25	Bundesliga	10	1	2	0	—		—		—		12	1
Werder Bremen	2025–26	Bundesliga	11	0	0	0	—		—		—		11	0
Werder Bremen	Total		32	2	2	0	—		—		—		34	2
FC Cincinnati (loan)	2026	Major League Soccer	1	0	—		—		—		—		1	0
Career total			83	3	7	0	14	0	15	0	0	0	119	3
