= Justin Njinmah =

German footballer (born 2000)

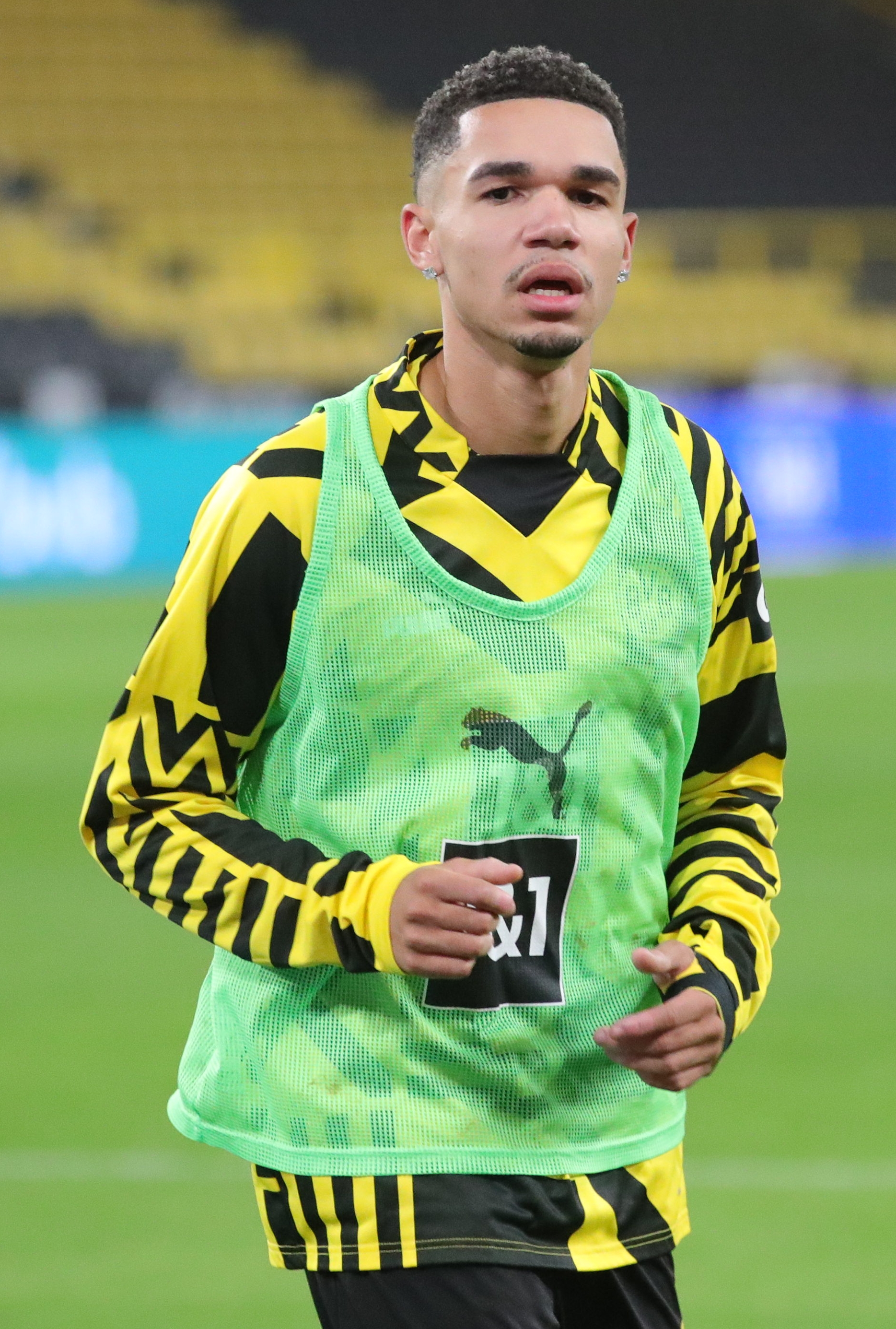
- Njinmah with Borussia Dortmund II in 2022

Personal information
- Full name: Justin Gideon Njinmah
- Date of birth: 15 November 2000 (age 25)
- Place of birth: Hamburg, Germany
- Height: 1.82 m (6 ft 0 in)
- Positions: Forward; winger

Team information
- Current team: Werder Bremen
- Number: 11

Youth career
- Eimsbütteler TV
- 2018–2019: Holstein Kiel

Senior career*
Years	Team	Apps	(Gls)
2019–2021	Holstein Kiel II	11	(4)
2021–2022	Werder Bremen II	18	(14)
2022–	Werder Bremen	84	(14)
2022–2023	→ Borussia Dortmund II (loan)	51	(18)
2022–2023	→ Borussia Dortmund (loan)	1	(0)
- * Club domestic league appearances and goals as of 30 August 2026

Justin Gideon Njinmah (born 15 November 2000) is a German professional footballer who plays as a forward or winger for Bundesliga club Werder Bremen.

== Career ==
Njinmah is a former youth academy player of Eimsbütteler TV and Holstein Kiel. On 6 January 2022, he signed his professional contract with Werder Bremen and was immediately loaned out to Borussia Dortmund II. He made his professional debut on 17 January 2022 in a 3–1 win against Waldhof Mannheim.

== Personal life ==
Born in Germany, Njinmah is of Nigerian descent.

== Career statistics ==
As of match played 30 August 2026

Appearances and goals by club, season and competition
Club	Season	League			Cup		Continental		Other		Total	
Club	Season	Division	Apps	Goals	Apps	Goals	Apps	Goals	Apps	Goals	Apps	Goals
Holstein Kiel II	2019–20	Regionalliga Nord	7	1	—		—		—		7	1
Holstein Kiel II	2020–21	Regionalliga Nord	4	3	—		—		—		4	3
Holstein Kiel II	Total		11	4	—		—		—		11	4
Werder Bremen II	2021–22	Regionalliga Nord	18	14	—		—		—		18	14
Borussia Dortmund II (loan)	2021–22	3. Liga	17	5	—		—		—		17	5
Borussia Dortmund II (loan)	2022–23	3. Liga	34	13	—		—		—		34	13
Borussia Dortmund II (loan)	Total		51	18	—		—		—		51	18
Borussia Dortmund (loan)	2022–23	Bundesliga	1	0	0	0	0	0	0	0	1	0
Werder Bremen	2023–24	Bundesliga	24	6	0	0	—		—		24	6
Werder Bremen	2024–25	Bundesliga	26	3	4	0	—		—		30	3
Werder Bremen	2025–26	Bundesliga	33	5	1	0	—		—		34	5
Werder Bremen	2026–27	Bundesliga	1	0	1	0	—		—		2	0
Werder Bremen	Total		84	14	6	0	—		—		90	14
Career total			165	50	6	0	0	0	0	0	171	50
