= Leon Opitz =

German footballer (born 2005)

Personal information
- Date of birth: 11 April 2005 (age 21)
- Place of birth: Bad Oldesloe, Germany
- Height: 1.83 m (6 ft 0 in)
- Position: Winger

Team information
- Current team: VfL Osnabrück (on loan from Werder Bremen)
- Number: 19

Youth career
- TSV Zarpen
- SV Eichede
- 2015–2016: VfB Lübeck
- 2016–2020: Hamburger SV
- 2020–2023: Werder Bremen

Senior career*
Years	Team	Apps	(Gls)
2023–	Werder Bremen II	35	(18)
2023–	Werder Bremen	3	(0)
2025–2026	→ Karlsruher SC (loan)	13	(0)
2026–	→ VfL Osnabrück (loan)	0	(0)

International career^{‡}
2023	Germany U18	4	(1)
2023	Germany U19	3	(1)
- * Club domestic league appearances and goals as of 18 May 2026 ‡ National team caps and goals as of 11 October 2023

Leon Opitz (born 11 April 2005) is a German professional footballer who plays as a winger for 2. Bundesliga club VfL Osnabrück, on loan from Werder Bremen.

== Club career ==
Opitz is a youth product of TSV Zarpen, SV Eichede, VfB Lübeck, Hamburger SV, and Werder Bremen. On 20 April 2023, he signed a professional contract with Werder Bremen. He made his senior and professional debut with Werder Bremen as late a substitute in a 4–0 Bundesliga loss to Bayern Munich on 18 August 2023. He signed his first professional contract in early September.

On 31 August 2025, Opitz moved on loan to Karlsruher SC in 2. Bundesliga, with an option to buy.

On 26 June 2026, he moved on a new loan to VfL Osnabrück.

== International career ==
Opitz is a youth international for Germany, having played up to the Germany U18s.

== Career statistics ==
As of match played 8 May 2026

Appearances and goals by club, season and competition
Club	Season	League			Cup		Continental		Other		Total	
Club	Season	Division	Apps	Goals	Apps	Goals	Apps	Goals	Apps	Goals	Apps	Goals
Werder Bremen II	2022–23	Regionalliga Nord	4	0	—		—		—		4	0
Werder Bremen II	2023–24	Bremen-Liga	5	2	—		—		2 (Note: Appearances in promotion play-offs)	0	7	2
Werder Bremen II	2024–25	Regionalliga Nord	26	16	—		—		—		26	16
Werder Bremen II	Total		35	18	0	0	0	0	2	0	37	18
Werder Bremen	2022–23	Bundesliga	0	0	0	0	—		—		0	0
Werder Bremen	2023–24	Bundesliga	3	0	0	0	—		—		3	0
Werder Bremen	Total		3	0	0	0	0	0	0	0	3	0
Karlsruher SC (loan)	2025–26	2. Bundesliga	13	0	—		—		—		13	0
VfL Osnabrück (loan)	2026–27	2. Bundesliga	0	0	0	0	—		—		0	0
Career total			51	18	0	0	0	0	2	0	53	18
