= Dikeni Salifou =

Togolese footballer (born 2003)

Personal information
- Full name: Dikeni-Rafid Salifou
- Date of birth: 8 June 2003 (age 23)
- Place of birth: Munich, Germany
- Height: 1.91 m (6 ft 3 in)
- Position: Defensive midfielder

Team information
- Current team: Mechelen
- Number: 29

Youth career
- 2017–2022: FC Augsburg

Senior career*
Years	Team	Apps	(Gls)
2022–2025	Werder Bremen II	13	(3)
2023–2025	Werder Bremen	1	(0)
2023–2024	→ Juventus Next Gen (loan)	31	(2)
2024–2025	→ Austria Klagenfurt (loan)	24	(2)
2025–	Mechelen	18	(0)

International career^{‡}
2024–	Togo	1	(0)
- * Club domestic league appearances and goals as of 31 May 2026 ‡ National team caps and goals as of 03:58, 9 September 2024 (UTC)

Dikeni-Rafid Salifou (born 8 June 2003) is a professional footballer who plays as a defensive midfielder for Belgian Pro League club Mechelen. Born in Germany, he plays for the Togo national team.

== Club career ==
A youth product of FC Augsburg, Salifou transferred to Werder Bremen on 5 May 2022 signing a professional contract. He was initially assigned to the Werder Bremen reserves. He made his senior and professional debut with Werder Bremen as a late substitute in a 2–0 Bundesliga win over VfB Stuttgart on 5 February 2023.

On 26 August 2024, Salifou was loaned by Austria Klagenfurt in Austria.

On 7 September 2025, Salifou signed a three-year contract with Mechelen in Belgium.

== International career ==
Born in Germany, Salifou is of Togolese descent. He was called up to represent the Togo national team in March 2022, but could not debut due to an injury.

== Style of play ==
Salifou is a technical and athletic player, who can play as a defensive midfielder or as centre-back.

== Career statistics ==
As of match played 29 October 2023

Appearances and goals by club, season and competition
Club	Season	League			National cup		Europe		Other		Total	
Club	Season	Division	Apps	Goals	Apps	Goals	Apps	Goals	Apps	Goals	Apps	Goals
Augsburg	2021–22	Bundesliga	0	0	0	0	0	0	0	0	0	0
Werder Bremen	2022–23	Bundesliga	1	0	0	0	—		—		1	0
Werder Bremen II	2022–23	Regionalliga Nord	13	3	—		—		—		13	3
Juventus Next Gen (loan)	2023–24	Serie C	9	2	0	0	—		—		9	2
Career total			23	5	0	0	0	0	0	0	23	5
