= Robert Hartmann (referee) =

German football referee (born 1979)

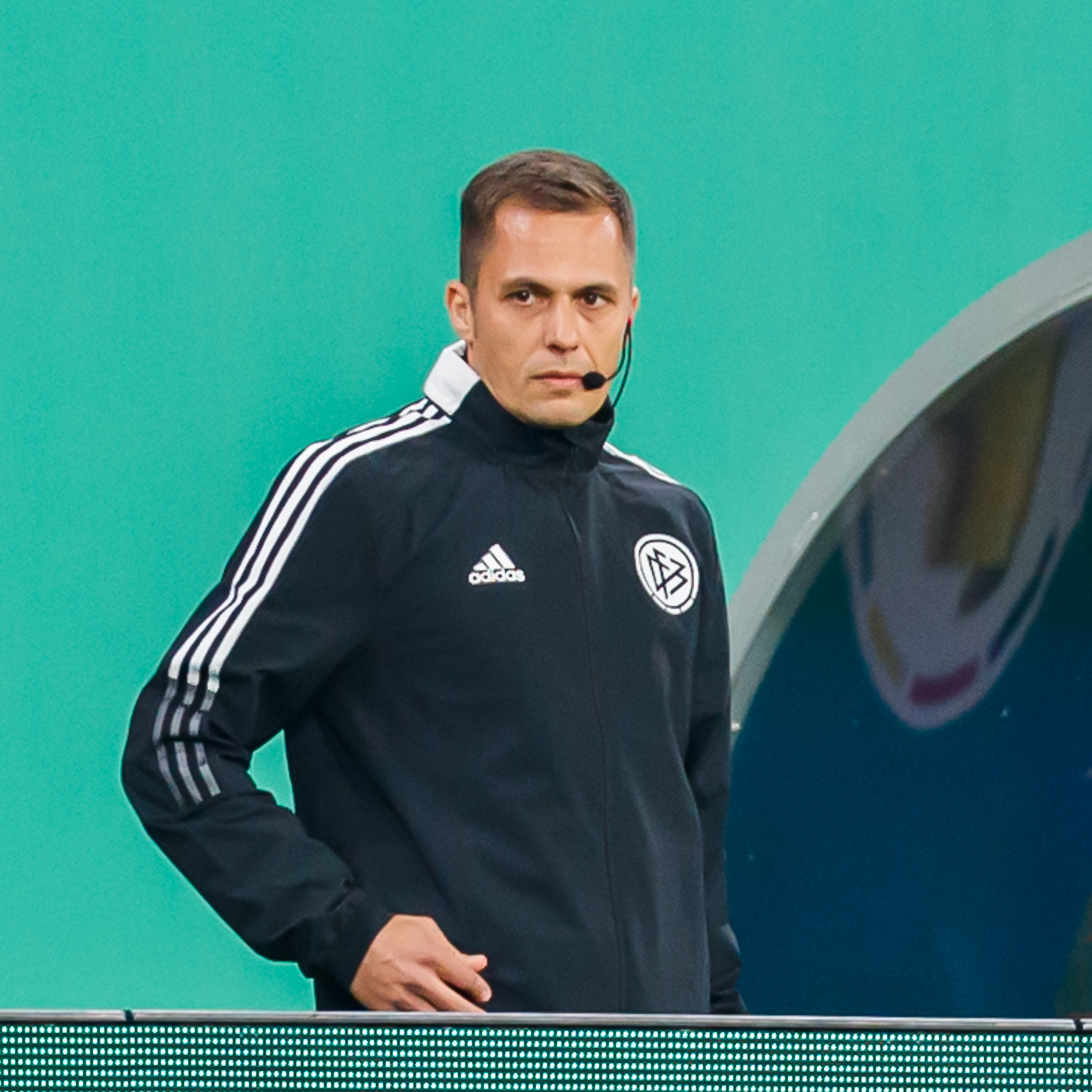
- Hartmann in 2022
- Born: 8 September 1979 (age 47)
- Other occupation: Business manager

Domestic
Years	League	Role
2005–	DFB	Referee
2007–	2. Bundesliga	Referee
2011–	Bundesliga	Referee

Robert Hartmann (born 8 September 1979) is a German football referee who is based in Wangen im Allgäu. He referees for SV Krugzell of the Bavarian Football Association.

== Refereeing career ==
Hartmann, official for SV Krugzell of the referee group Kempten/Oberallgäu, has been a DFB official since 2005. He made his debut in the 2. Bundesliga in 2007. Hartmann was then appointed as a Bundesliga referee in early 2011. His debut match was on 19 February 2011 between SC Freiburg and VfL Wolfsburg.

On 19 June 2011 Hartmann officiated the final of the 2010–11 Under 19 Bundesliga in the VfL-Stadion am Elsterweg in Wolfsburg. VfL Wolfsburg won 4–2 against 1. FC Kaiserslautern.

On 17 October 2014, in the 2. Bundesliga match between VfL Bochum and Darmstadt 98, Hartmann was the first referee in German football to use vanishing spray during a match, which the DFL had introduced.

== Personal life ==
Hartmann has a degree in business administration and lives in Wangen im Allgäu.
