= 2020–21 SV Werder Bremen season =

Werder Bremen
2020–21 season
- Chairman: Marco Bode
- Chief executive: Frank Baumann
- Head coach: Florian Kohfeldt (until 16 May); Thomas Schaaf (caretaker, from 16 May)
- Stadium: Weserstadion
- Bundesliga: 17th (relegated)
- DFB-Pokal: Semi-finals
- Top goalscorer: League: Niclas Füllkrug; Kevin Möhwald; Josh Sargent (5 each); All: Josh Sargent (7)
Home colours	Away colours	Third colours

The 2020–21 SV Werder Bremen season was the club's 122nd season in existence and the club's 40th consecutive season in the top flight of German football. In addition to the domestic league, SV Werder Bremen participated in this season's edition of the DFB-Pokal. The season covered the period from 7 July 2020 to 30 June 2021.

== Players ==
=== First-team squad ===
As of 9 February 2021

Note: Flags indicate national team as defined under FIFA eligibility rules; some limited exceptions apply. Players may hold more than one non-FIFA nationality.

No.	Pos.	Nation	Player
1	GK	CZE	Jiří Pavlenka
5	DF	SWE	Ludwig Augustinsson
6	MF	GER	Kevin Möhwald
7	MF	KOS	Milot Rashica
8	FW	JPN	Yuya Osako
9	FW	GER	Davie Selke (on loan from Hertha BSC)
10	MF	GER	Leonardo Bittencourt
11	FW	GER	Niclas Füllkrug
13	DF	SRB	Miloš Veljković
16	MF	GER	Oscar Schönfelder
17	DF	GER	Felix Agu
18	DF	FIN	Niklas Moisander (captain)
19	FW	USA	Josh Sargent

No.	Pos.	Nation	Player
20	MF	AUT	Romano Schmid
21	DF	TUR	Ömer Toprak
23	DF	CZE	Theodor Gebre Selassie (vice-captain)
28	MF	BUL	Ilia Gruev
29	MF	GER	Patrick Erras
30	GK	GER	Michael Zetterer
32	DF	AUT	Marco Friedl
34	MF	GER	Jean-Manuel Mbom
35	MF	GER	Maximilian Eggestein
36	DF	GER	Christian Groß
38	GK	GER	Eduardo Dos Santos Haesler
41	FW	GER	Nick Woltemade
43	FW	GER	Eren Dinkçi

=== Players out on loan ===
Note: Flags indicate national team as defined under FIFA eligibility rules; some limited exceptions apply. Players may hold more than one non-FIFA nationality.

No.	Pos.	Nation	Player
—	DF	GER	Jan-Niklas Beste (to Jahn Regensburg until 30 June 2022)
—	MF	GER	Benjamin Goller (to Karlsruher SC until 30 June 2021)
—	FW	GER	Luc Ihorst (to VfL Osnabrück until 30 June 2022)
—	FW	GER	David Philipp (to ADO Den Haag until 30 June 2021)
—	FW	GER	Johannes Eggestein (to LASK until 30 June 2021)
—	GK	GRE	Stefanos Kapino (to SV Sandhausen until 30 June 2021)

No.	Pos.	Nation	Player
—	MF	GER	Niklas Schmidt (to VfL Osnabrück until 30 June 2021)
—	DF	GER	Jannes Vollert (to Hallescher FC until 30 June 2021)
—	FW	GHA	Jonah Osabutey (to Oud-Heverlee Leuven until 30 June 2021)
—	MF	GER	Thore Jacobsen (to Magdeburg until 30 June 2021)
—	MF	GER	Ole Käuper (to FC Nitra until 30 June 2021)

== Transfers ==
=== In ===
No.	Pos	Player	Transferred from	Fee	Date	Source
16	FW	(Germany) Oscar Schönfelder	(Germany) Mainz 05 youth		1 July 2020	
17	DF	(Germany) Felix Agu	(Germany) VfL Osnabrück	Undisclosed	1 July 2020	
10	MF	(Germany) Leonardo Bittencourt	(Germany) 1899 Hoffenheim	€7 million	7 July 2020	
21	DF	(Turkey) Ömer Toprak	(Germany) Borussia Dortmund	Undisclosed	7 July 2020	
29	MF	(Germany) Patrick Erras	(Germany) 1. FC Nürnberg	Free	30 July 2020	
22	MF	(Netherlands) Tahith Chong	(England) Manchester United	Loan	16 August 2020	

=== Out ===
No.	Pos	Player	Transferred to	Fee	Date	Source
4	DF	(Switzerland) Michael Lang	(Germany) Borussia Mönchengladbach	Loan return	1 July 2020	
3	DF	(Germany) Kevin Vogt	(Germany) 1899 Hoffenheim	Loan return	2 July 2020	
14	FW	(Peru) Claudio Pizarro	N/A	Free	8 July 2020	
22	MF	(Germany) Fin Bartels	(Germany) Holstein Kiel	Free	5 August 2020	
17	MF	(Turkey) Nuri Şahin	(Turkey) Antalyaspor	Free	19 August 2020	
30	MF	(Netherlands) Davy Klaassen	(Netherlands) Ajax	€11 million	5 October 2020	

== Pre-season and friendlies ==
Win Draw Loss

9 August 2020 Friendly	Werder Bremen	2–0	Eintracht Braunschweig	Bremen, Germany
13:00 CEST (UTC+2)	Augustinsson 15'; Klaassen 21'	Report		Stadium: Weserstadion Platz 11; Referee: Sven Jablonski

19 August 2020 Friendly	LASK	1–4	Werder Bremen	Zell am Ziller, Austria
17:00 CEST (UTC+2)	Raguž 56' (pen.)	Report	Selke 5'; Eggestein 16'; Sargent 47'; Osako 77'	Stadium: Parkstadion Zell Am Ziller; Attendance: 500; Referee: Walter Altmann

24 August 2020 Friendly	SC Austria Lustenau	2–4	Werder Bremen	Zell am Ziller, Austria
13:00 CEST (UTC+2)	Ranacher 49'; Bertaccini 68'	Report	Selke 21' (pen.); Eggestein 30'; Rashica 50'; Füllkrug 55'	Stadium: Parkstadion Zell Am Ziller

29 August 2020 Friendly	Werder Bremen	4–0	FC Groningen	Lohne, Germany
15:00 CEST (UTC+2)	Sargent 10'; Eggestein 15'; Bittencourt 24'; Chong 34'	Report		Stadium: Heinz-Dettmer-Stadion

29 August 2020 Friendly	Werder Bremen	1–0	FC St. Pauli	Lohne, Germany
17:15 CEST (UTC+2)	Rashica 43'	Report		Stadium: Heinz-Dettmer-Stadion

5 September 2020 Friendly	Werder Bremen	2–0	Hannover 96	Bremen, Germany
13:00 CEST (UTC+2)	Füllkrug 39'; Sargent 73'	Report		Stadium: Weserstadion Platz 11

5 September 2020 Friendly	Werder Bremen	7–0	BSV Schwarz-Weiß Rehden	Bremen, Germany
15:45 CEST (UTC+2)	Eggestein 11'; Chong 19', 54'; Selke 24', 76', 86'; Bittencourt 27'	Report		Stadium: Weserstadion Platz 11

7 October 2020 Friendly	Werder Bremen	4–1	FC St. Pauli	Bremen, Germany
17:00 CEST (UTC+2)	Chong 11', 87'; Sargent 15'; Bittencourt 35'	Report	Tashchy 65'	Stadium: Weserstadion Platz 11

13 November 2020 Friendly	Werder Bremen	2–4	FC St. Pauli	Bremen, Germany
14:00 CET (UTC+1)	Woltemade 60'; Nankishi 93'	Report	Makienok 15'; Daschner 53'; Tashchy 61' (pen.); Matanovic 85'	Stadium: Weserstadion Platz 11; Attendance: 0 Referee: Sven Jablonski
Note: Match was played in three 35-minute periods.

== Competitions ==
=== Overview ===
Competition	First match	Last match	Starting round	Final position	Record							
Competition	First match	Last match	Starting round	Final position	Pld	W	D	L	GF	GA	GD	Win %
Bundesliga	19 September 2020	22 May 2021	Matchday 1	17th	34	7	10	17	36	57	−21	20.59
DFB-Pokal	12 September 2020	30 April 2021	First round	Semi-finals	5	4	0	1	9	2	+7	80.00
Total					39	11	10	18	45	59	−14	28.21

Last updated: 22 May 2021
Source: Soccerway

=== Bundesliga ===
==== League table ====
Pos	Team	Pld	W	D	L	GF	GA	GD	Pts	Qualification or relegation
14	Hertha BSC	34	8	11	15	41	52	−11	35	
15	Arminia Bielefeld	34	9	8	17	26	52	−26	35	
16	1. FC Köln (O)	34	8	9	17	34	60	−26	33	Qualification for the relegation play-offs
17	Werder Bremen (R)	34	7	10	17	36	57	−21	31	Relegation to 2. Bundesliga
18	Schalke 04 (R)	34	3	7	24	25	86	−61	16	Relegation to 2. Bundesliga

Source: DFB
Rules for classification: 1) Points; 2) Goal difference; 3) Goals scored; 4) Head-to-head results; 5) Head-to-head away goals scored; 6) Away goals scored; 7) Play-off.
(O) Play-off winners; (R) Relegated

==== Results summary ====
Overall								Home						Away					
Pld	W	D	L	GF	GA	GD	Pts	W	D	L	GF	GA	GD	W	D	L	GF	GA	GD
34	7	10	17	36	57	−21	31	3	5	9	16	28	−12	4	5	8	20	29	−9

Last updated: 22 May 2021.
Source: DFB

==== Results by round ====
Round	1	2	3	4	5	6	7	8	9	10	11	12	13	14	15	16	17	18	19	20	21	22	23	24	25	26	27	28	29	30	31	32	33	34
Ground	H	A	H	A	H	A	H	A	A	H	A	H	A	H	A	H	A	A	H	A	H	A	H	A	H	H	A	H	A	H	A	H	A	H
Result	L	W	W	D	D	D	D	D	L	L	L	L	W	L	D	W	L	W	D	W	D	L	W	D	L	L	L	L	L	L	L	D	L	L
Position	16	11	7	7	7	9	9	9	11	13	13	14	13	14	13	12	13	13	11	11	11	12	12	12	12	12	13	13	13	14	15	15	16	17

Updated to match(es) played on 22 May 2021. Source: DFB
A = Away; H = Home; W = Win; D = Draw; L = Loss

==== Matches ====
The league fixtures were announced on 7 August 2020.

19 September 2020 1	Werder Bremen	1–4	Hertha BSC	Bremen
15:30 CEST (UTC+2)	M. Eggestein (yellow card) 46'; Selke 69', (yellow card) 90+1'	Report	Pekarík 42'; Lukebakio 45+2'; Cunha 62'; Córdoba 90'	Stadium: Weser-Stadion; Attendance: 8,400; Referee: Sascha Stegemann

26 September 2020 2	Schalke 04	1–3	Werder Bremen	Gelsenkirchen
18:30 CEST (UTC+2)	Paciência (yellow card) 35'; Stambouli (yellow card) 36'; Uth (yellow card) 38', (goal) 90+3'; Boujellab (yellow card) 55'; Kabak (yellow card) 58' (yellow-red card) 84'; Bentaleb (yellow card) 63'	Report	Füllkrug 22', 37', 59' (pen.); Mbom (yellow card) 74'; Klaassen (yellow card) 78'	Stadium: Veltins-Arena; Attendance: 0 Referee: Markus Schmidt

3 October 2020 3	Werder Bremen	1–0	Arminia Bielefeld	Bremen
15:30 CEST (UTC+2)	Bittencourt 27'; Friedl (yellow card) 40'; J. Eggestein (yellow card) 90+1'	Report	Lucoqui (yellow card) 52'; Van der Hoorn (yellow card) 90+4'	Stadium: Weser-Stadion; Attendance: 0 Referee: Robert Schröder

17 October 2020 4	SC Freiburg	1–1	Werder Bremen	Freiburg
15:30 CEST (UTC+2)	Lienhart 16'; Höfler (yellow card) 27'; Santamaria (yellow card) 89'; Schmid (yellow card) 90+2'	Report	Füllkrug 25' (pen.); Augustinsson (yellow card) 44'; Mbom (yellow card) 51'; Sargent (yellow card) 83'	Stadium: Schwarzwald-Stadion; Attendance: 0 Referee: Christian Dingert

25 October 2020 5	Werder Bremen	1–1	1899 Hoffenheim	Bremen
18:00 CET (UTC+1)	M. Eggestein 5'; Friedl (yellow card) 79'; Gebre Selassie (yellow card) 90+2'	Report	Geiger 22'; Posch (yellow card) 59'; Gaćinović (yellow card) 89'	Stadium: Weser-Stadion; Attendance: 0 Referee: Daniel Schlager

31 October 2020 6	Eintracht Frankfurt	1–1	Werder Bremen	Frankfurt
15:30 CET (UTC+1)	Ilsanker (yellow card) 4'; Silva 65'	Report	Mbom (yellow card) 45+2'; Sargent 51', (yellow card) 55'; Osako (yellow card) 90+3'	Stadium: Deutsche Bank Park; Attendance: 0 Referee: Felix Brych

6 November 2020 7	Werder Bremen	1–1	1. FC Köln	Bremen
20:30 CET (UTC+1)	Mbom (yellow card) 31'; Osako (yellow card) 67'; Bittencourt 82' (pen.)	Report	Wolf (yellow card) 23'; Czichos (yellow card) 65'; Moisander 67' (o.g.)	Stadium: Weser-Stadion; Attendance: 0 Referee: Florian Badstübner

21 November 2020 8	Bayern Munich	1–1	Werder Bremen	Munich
15:30 CET (UTC+1)	Pavard (yellow card) 15'; Coman 62'	Report	Bittencourt (yellow card) 32'; Augustinsson (yellow card) 43'; Eggestein 45'; Pavlenka (yellow card) 90+4'	Stadium: Allianz Arena; Attendance: 0 Referee: Guido Winkmann

27 November 2020 9	VfL Wolfsburg	5–3	Werder Bremen	Wolfsburg
20:30 CET (UTC+1)	Baku 22'; Brooks 25'; Weghorst 37', 76'; Lacroix (yellow card) 73'; Arnold (yellow card) 81'; Białek 90+5'	Report	Bittencourt 13'; Mbom (yellow card) 24'; Möhwald 36', (yellow card) 57' (yellow-red card) 80'; Brooks 47' (o.g.)	Stadium: Volkswagen Arena; Attendance: 0 Referee: Christian Dingert

6 December 2020 10	Werder Bremen	1–2	VfB Stuttgart	Bremen
15:30 CET (UTC+1)	Osako (yellow card) 25'; Chong (yellow card) 40'; Groß (yellow card) 66'; Selke (yellow card) 90+1', (goal) 90+3'	Report	Silas 31' (pen.), 90+1', (yellow card) 90+1'; Mavropanos (yellow card) 36'; Mangala (yellow card) 56'; Castro (yellow card) 59'	Stadium: Weser-Stadion; Attendance: 0 Referee: Frank Willenborg

12 December 2020 11	RB Leipzig	2–0	Werder Bremen	Leipzig
15:30 CET (UTC+1)	Sabitzer 26' (pen.); Olmo 41'; Kampl (yellow card) 44'; Mukiele (yellow card) 47'; Upamecano (yellow card) 78'	Report	Augustinsson (yellow card) 25'	Stadium: Red Bull Arena; Attendance: 0 Referee: Sören Storks

15 December 2020 12	Werder Bremen	1–2	Borussia Dortmund	Bremen
20:30 CET (UTC+1)	Möhwald 28'; Groß (yellow card) 54'; Woltemade (yellow card) 87'; Schmid (yellow card) 90+2'	Report	Guerreiro 12'; Reus (yellow card) 35', (penalty missed) 77', 78'; Witsel (yellow card) 60'	Stadium: Weser-Stadion; Attendance: 0 Referee: Robert Schröder

19 December 2020 13	Mainz 05	0–1	Werder Bremen	Mainz
15:30 CET (UTC+1)	Barreiro (yellow card) 73'; Niakhaté (yellow card) 82'	Report	Eggestein (yellow card) 50'; Dinkçi 90'; Groß (yellow card) 90+5'	Stadium: Opel Arena; Attendance: 0 Referee: Guido Winkmann

2 January 2021 14	Werder Bremen	0–2	Union Berlin	Bremen
15:30 CET (UTC+1)	Groß (yellow card) 33'; Selke (yellow card) 53'	Report	Becker 12', (yellow card) 68'; Andrich (yellow card) 25'; Awoniyi 28'; Prömel (yellow card) 44'; Hübner (yellow card) 50'	Stadium: Weser-Stadion; Attendance: 0 Referee: Tobias Stieler

9 January 2021 15	Bayer Leverkusen	1–1	Werder Bremen	Leverkusen
15:30 CET (UTC+1)	Schick (yellow card) 67', (goal) 70'; Demirbay (yellow card) 89'	Report	Toprak 52'; Augustinsson (yellow card) 55'; Mbom (yellow card) 88'	Stadium: BayArena; Attendance: 0 Referee: Benjamin Cortus

16 January 2021 16	Werder Bremen	2–0	FC Augsburg	Bremen
15:30 CET (UTC+1)	Gebre Selassie 84'; Agu 87'	Report	Caligiuri (yellow card) 32'	Stadium: Weser-Stadion; Attendance: 0 Referee: Sascha Stegemann

19 January 2021 17	Borussia Mönchengladbach	1–0	Werder Bremen	Mönchengladbach
18:30 CET (UTC+1)	Sommer (yellow card) 37'; Elvedi 66'; Wendt (yellow card) 68'	Report	Pavlenka (yellow card) 22'; Sargent (yellow card) 48'	Stadium: Borussia-Park; Attendance: 0 Referee: Martin Petersen

23 January 2021 18	Hertha BSC	1–4	Werder Bremen	Berlin
18:30 CET (UTC+1)	Mittelstädt (yellow card) 9'; Cunha (penalty missed) 21'; Córdoba (yellow card) 26', (goal) 45+2'	Report	Selke 10' (pen.), (yellow card) 12'; Mbom (yellow card) 21'; Toprak 29'; Bittencourt 57', (yellow card) 86'; Sargent 77'	Stadium: Olympiastadion; Attendance: 0 Referee: Daniel Schlager

30 January 2021 19	Werder Bremen	1–1	Schalke 04	Bremen
15:30 CET (UTC+1)	Möhwald 77'	Report	Mascarell 38'; Stambouli (yellow card) 63'; Fährmann (yellow card) 66'; Huntelaar (yellow card) 88'; Thiaw (yellow card) 90+2'	Stadium: Weser-Stadion; Attendance: 0 Referee: Sören Storks

13 February 2021 21	Werder Bremen	0–0	SC Freiburg	Bremen
15:30 CET (UTC+1)		Report	Höfler (yellow card) 83'; Heintz (yellow card) 90+1'	Stadium: Weser-Stadion; Attendance: 0 Referee: Manuel Gräfe

21 February 2021 22	1899 Hoffenheim	4–0	Werder Bremen	Sinsheim
18:00 CET (UTC+1)	Rudy (yellow card) 16'; Bebou 26'; Baumgartner 44'; Dabbur 49'; Kadeřábek (yellow card) 51'; Rutter 90'	Report	Toprak (yellow card) 8'; Friedl (yellow card) 69'	Stadium: Rhein-Neckar-Arena; Attendance: 0 Referee: Robert Schröder

26 February 2021 23	Werder Bremen	2–1	Eintracht Frankfurt	Bremen
20:30 CET (UTC+1)	Gebre Selassie (yellow card) 35', (goal) 47'; Sargent 62'; Schmid (yellow card) 78'; Friedl (yellow card) 81'; Möhwald (yellow card) 81'	Report	Silva 9'; Rode (yellow card) 40'; Younes (yellow card) 81'; Tuta (yellow card) 90+2'	Stadium: Weser-Stadion; Attendance: 0 Referee: Robert Hartmann

7 March 2021 24	1. FC Köln	1–1	Werder Bremen	Cologne
15:30 CET (UTC+1)	Jakobs (yellow card) 21'; Drexler (yellow card) 80'; Hector 83'	Report	Sargent 66'	Stadium: RheinEnergieStadion; Attendance: 0 Referee: Matthias Jöllenbeck

10 March 2021 20	Arminia Bielefeld	0–2	Werder Bremen	Bielefeld
18:30 CET (UTC+1)	De Medina (red card) 71'; Pieper (yellow card) 90+6'	Report	Friedl (yellow card) 35'; Sargent 47'; Möhwald 75'; Eggestein (yellow card) 87'	Stadium: Bielefelder Alm; Attendance: 0 Referee: Markus Schmidt
Note: The match was originally scheduled for 7 February 2021, but was postponed due to heavy snow causing a waterlogged pitch.

13 March 2021 25	Werder Bremen	1–3	Bayern Munich	Bremen
15:30 CET (UTC+1)	Sargent (yellow card) 70'; Füllkrug 86'	Report	Goretzka 22'; Gnabry 35'; Lewandowski 67'	Stadium: Weser-Stadion; Attendance: 0 Referee: Manuel Gräfe

20 March 2021 26	Werder Bremen	1–2	VfL Wolfsburg	Bremen
15:30 CET (UTC+1)	Möhwald 45'; Sargent (yellow card) 57'; Füllkrug (yellow card) 90+1'; Bittencourt (yellow card) 90+3'	Report	Sargent 9' (o.g.); Weghorst 42'; Schlager (yellow card) 81'	Stadium: Weser-Stadion; Attendance: 0 Referee: Robert Schröder

4 April 2021 27	VfB Stuttgart	1–0	Werder Bremen	Stuttgart
15:30 CEST (UTC+2)	Förster (yellow card) 16'; Augustinsson 81' (o.g.)	Report	Möhwald (yellow card) 12'; Eggestein (yellow card) 51'	Stadium: Mercedes-Benz Arena; Attendance: 0 Referee: Felix Zwayer

10 April 2021 28	Werder Bremen	1–4	RB Leipzig	Bremen
15:30 CEST (UTC+2)	Rashica 61' (pen.)	Report	Olmo 23'; Sørloth 32', 41'; Sabitzer 63'	Stadium: Weser-Stadion; Attendance: 0 Referee: Florian Badstübner

18 April 2021 29	Borussia Dortmund	4–1	Werder Bremen	Dortmund
15:30 CEST (UTC+2)	Reyna 29'; Haaland 34' (pen.), 38'; Dahoud (yellow card) 48'; Hummels 87'	Report	Rashica 14'; Friedl (yellow card) 60'; Veljković (yellow card) 66'; Groß (yellow card) 77'; Moisander (yellow card) 85'	Stadium: Signal Iduna Park; Attendance: 0 Referee: Bastian Dankert

21 April 2021 30	Werder Bremen	0–1	Mainz 05	Bremen
20:30 CEST (UTC+2)	Sargent (yellow card) 63'	Report	Szalai 16'; Boëtius (yellow card) 66'; Zentner (yellow card) 83'	Stadium: Weser-Stadion; Attendance: 0 Referee: Marco Fritz

24 April 2021 31	Union Berlin	3–1	Werder Bremen	Berlin
15:30 CEST (UTC+2)	Pohjanpalo 50', 53', 67'	Report	Gebre Selassie 82'	Stadium: Stadion An der Alten Försterei; Attendance: 0 Referee: Patrick Ittrich

8 May 2021 32	Werder Bremen	0–0	Bayer Leverkusen	Bremen
15:30 CEST (UTC+2)	Sargent (yellow card) 4'; Groß (yellow card) 42'; Gebre Selassie (yellow card) 87'; Dinkçi (red card) 90+4'	Report	Sinkgraven (yellow card) 27'; Schick (yellow card) 90+1'	Stadium: Weser-Stadion; Attendance: 0 Referee: Markus Schmidt

15 May 2021 33	FC Augsburg	2–0	Werder Bremen	Augsburg
15:30 CEST (UTC+2)	Vargas (red card) 13'; Gikiewicz (yellow card) 45+1'; Khedira 57'; Richter (yellow card) 65'; Caligiuri 90' (pen.); Hahn (yellow card) 90+2'	Report	Groß (yellow card) 42' (yellow-red card) 49'; Moisander (yellow card) 90+2'	Stadium: WWK Arena; Attendance: 0 Referee: Robert Schröder

22 May 2021 34	Werder Bremen	2–4	Borussia Mönchengladbach	Bremen
15:30 CEST (UTC+2)	Rashica 80'; Füllkrug 83'; Moisander (yellow card) 87'	Report	Stindl 3'; Wolf (yellow card) 35'; Thuram 52'; Bensebaini 58'; Zakaria (yellow card) 62'; Neuhaus 68'	Stadium: Weser-Stadion; Attendance: 100; Referee: Felix Brych

=== DFB-Pokal ===
12 September 2020 First round	Carl Zeiss Jena	0–2	Werder Bremen	Jena
20:45 CEST (UTC+2)	Oesterhelweg (yellow card) 13'; Steinherr (yellow card) 40'; Slamar (yellow card) 45+3'; Eckardt (yellow card) 67'	Report	Selke (yellow card) 45+3'; Sargent 49'; Chong 88'	Stadium: Ernst-Abbe-Sportfeld; Attendance: 1,600; Referee: Daniel Siebert

23 December 2020 Second round	Hannover 96	0–3	Werder Bremen	Hanover
20:45 CET (UTC+1)	Ducksch (yellow card) 36'	Report	Gebre Selassie 30'; Sargent 32'; Chong (yellow card) 58'; Mbom 60'; Groß (yellow card) 71'	Stadium: HDI-Arena; Attendance: 0 Referee: Manuel Gräfe

2 February 2021 Round of 16	Werder Bremen	2–0	Greuther Fürth	Bremen
20:45 CET (UTC+1)	Möhwald 12'; Agu 73'; Moisander (yellow card) 87'; Gebre Selassie (yellow card) 90+4'	Report	Bauer (yellow card) 22'; Stach (yellow card) 39'	Stadium: Wohninvest Weserstadion; Attendance: 0 Referee: Guido Winkmann

7 April 2021 (Note: The Jahn Regensburg v Werder Bremen match, originally scheduled on 2 March 2021, 18:30, was postponed to 7 April 2021 after the Jahn Regensburg team were placed into quarantine due to players and staff members of the club testing positive for SARS-CoV-2.) Quarter-finals	Jahn Regensburg	0–1	Werder Bremen	Regensburg
18:30 CEST (UTC+2)	Saller (yellow card) 4'	Report	Osako 52'; Agu (yellow card) 83'	Stadium: Jahnstadion Regensburg; Attendance: 0 Referee: Guido Winkmann

30 April 2021 (Note: The Werder Bremen v RB Leipzig match, originally scheduled on 2 May 2021, 20:30, was rescheduled to 30 April 2021 for undisclosed reasons.) Semi-finals	Werder Bremen	1–2 (a.e.t.)	RB Leipzig	Bremen
20:30 CEST (UTC+2)	Bittencourt 105+1'	Report	Haidara (yellow card) 35'; Hwang 93'; Kampl (yellow card) 99'; Gulácsi (yellow card) 101'; Forsberg 120+1'	Stadium: Weser-Stadion; Attendance: 0 Referee: Manuel Gräfe

== Statistics ==
=== Appearances and goals ===
No.	Pos	Nat	Player	Total		Bundesliga		DFB-Pokal	
No.	Pos	Nat	Player	Apps	Goals	Apps	Goals	Apps	Goals
Goalkeepers
1	GK	(Czech Republic) CZE	Jiří Pavlenka	23	0	20	0	3	0
30	GK	(Germany) GER	Michael Zetterer	0	0	0	0	0	0
38	GK	(Germany) GER	Eduardo Dos Santos Haesler	0	0	0	0	0	0
Defenders
5	DF	(Sweden) SWE	Ludwig Augustinsson	17	0	13+1	0	3	0
13	DF	(Serbia) SRB	Miloš Veljković	15	0	11+2	0	2	0
17	DF	(Germany) GER	Felix Agu	9	2	4+3	1	0+2	1
18	DF	(Finland) FIN	Niklas Moisander	13	0	4+6	0	3	0
21	DF	(Turkey) TUR	Ömer Toprak	17	2	14+2	2	1	0
23	DF	(Czech Republic) CZE	Theodor Gebre Selassie	23	2	20	1	3	1
32	DF	(Austria) AUT	Marco Friedl	21	0	20	0	1	0
36	DF	(Germany) GER	Christian Groß	15	0	10+4	0	1	0
Midfielders
6	MF	(Germany) GER	Kevin Möhwald	15	4	8+6	3	1	1
7	MF	(Kosovo) KOS	Milot Rashica	11	0	4+6	0	1	0
10	MF	(Germany) GER	Leonardo Bittencourt	18	4	13+4	4	1	0
16	MF	(Germany) GER	Oscar Schönfelder	0	0	0	0	0	0
20	MF	(Austria) AUT	Romano Schmid	13	0	7+4	0	2	0
22	MF	(Netherlands) NED	Tahith Chong	15	1	4+9	0	1+1	1
28	MF	(Bulgaria) BUL	Ilia Gruev	3	0	0+1	0	0+2	0
29	MF	(Germany) GER	Patrick Erras	4	0	0+2	0	1+1	0
34	MF	(Germany) GER	Jean-Manuel Mbom	18	1	13+3	0	1+1	1
35	MF	(Germany) GER	Maximilian Eggestein	23	2	20	2	3	0
Forwards
8	FW	(Japan) JPN	Yuya Osako	17	0	6+9	0	1+1	0
9	FW	(Germany) GER	Davie Selke	13	3	3+9	3	1	0
11	FW	(Germany) GER	Niclas Füllkrug	7	4	4+3	4	0	0
19	FW	(United States) USA	Josh Sargent	22	4	18+1	2	3	2
41	FW	(Germany) GER	Nick Woltemade	8	0	1+5	0	0+2	0
43	FW	(Germany) GER	Eren Dinkçi	3	1	0+1	1	0+2	0
Players transferred out during the season
27	GK	(Greece) GRE	Stefanos Kapino	0	0	0	0	0	0
30	MF	(Netherlands) NED	Davy Klaassen	4	0	3	0	0+1	0
24	FW	(Germany) GER	Johannes Eggestein	3	0	0+2	0	0+1	0

Last updated: 13 February 2021
Source: Soccerway

=== Goalscorers ===
Rank	No.	Pos	Nat	Name	Bundesliga	DFB-Pokal	Total
1	19	FW	(United States)	Josh Sargent	5	2	7
2	6	MF	(Germany)	Kevin Möhwald	5	1	6
3	10	MF	(Germany)	Leonardo Bittencourt	4	1	5
3	11	FW	(Germany)	Niclas Füllkrug	5	0	5
5	23	DF	(Czech Republic)	Theodor Gebre Selassie	3	1	4
6	9	FW	(Germany)	Davie Selke	3	0	3
7	17	DF	(Germany)	Felix Agu	1	1	2
7	21	DF	(Turkey)	Ömer Toprak	2	0	2
7	34	MF	(Germany)	Jean-Manuel Mbom	1	1	2
7	35	MF	(Germany)	Maximilian Eggestein	2	0	2
11	8	FW	(Japan)	Yuya Osako	0	1	1
11	22	MF	(Netherlands)	Tahith Chong	0	1	1
11	43	FW	(Germany)	Eren Dinkçi	1	0	1
Own goals					2	0	2
Totals					34	9	43

Last updated: 16 May 2021.
Source: FBref
