= 2021–22 SV Werder Bremen season =

Werder Bremen
2021–22 season
- Chairman: Marco Bode
- Chief Executive: Frank Baumann
- Head Coach: Ole Werner
- Stadium: Weserstadion
- 2. Bundesliga: 2nd (promoted)
- DFB-Pokal: First round
- Top goalscorer: League: Marvin Ducksch (20); All: Marvin Ducksch (20)
Home colours	Away colours	Third colours

The 2021–22 season was the 123rd season in the existence of SV Werder Bremen and the club's first season in the second division of German football since 1980–81. In addition to the domestic league, Werder Bremen participated in this season's edition of the DFB-Pokal.

== Players ==
=== First-team squad ===
As of 16 October 2021

Note: Flags indicate national team as defined under FIFA eligibility rules; some limited exceptions apply. Players may hold more than one non-FIFA nationality.

No.	Pos.	Nation	Player
1	GK	CZE	Jiří Pavlenka
3	DF	GER	Anthony Jung
7	FW	GER	Marvin Ducksch
8	DF	GER	Mitchell Weiser (on loan from Bayer Leverkusen)
10	MF	GER	Leonardo Bittencourt
11	FW	GER	Niclas Füllkrug
13	DF	SRB	Miloš Veljković
15	FW	CIV	Roger Assalé (on loan from Dijon)
16	MF	GER	Oscar Schönfelder
17	FW	GER	Abdenego Nankishi
20	MF	AUT	Romano Schmid
21	DF	TUR	Ömer Toprak (captain)
22	MF	GER	Niklas Schmidt

No.	Pos.	Nation	Player
23	MF	GER	Nicolai Rapp
25	DF	KOR	Kyu-hyun Park
26	DF	GER	Lars Lukas Mai (on loan from Bayern Munich)
27	DF	GER	Felix Agu
28	MF	BUL	Ilia Gruev
29	FW	GER	Nick Woltemade
30	GK	GER	Michael Zetterer
32	DF	AUT	Marco Friedl
34	MF	GER	Jean-Manuel Mbom
36	DF	GER	Christian Groß
39	DF	ITA	Fabio Chiarodia
40	GK	GER	Luca Plogmann
43	FW	GER	Eren Dinkçi

=== Players out on loan ===
Note: Flags indicate national team as defined under FIFA eligibility rules; some limited exceptions apply. Players may hold more than one non-FIFA nationality.

No.	Pos.	Nation	Player
—	GK	GER	Eduardo Dos Santos Haesler (to FC Nordsjaelland until 30 June 2022)
—	DF	GER	Dominik Becker (to 1. FC Saarbrücken until 30 June 2023)
—	DF	GER	Jan-Niklas Beste (to Jahn Regensburg until 30 June 2022)
—	MF	GER	Yannik Engelhardt (to SC Freiburg II until 30 June 2022)

No.	Pos.	Nation	Player
—	MF	GER	Benjamin Goller (to Karlsruher SC until 30 June 2022)
—	FW	GAM	Kebba Badjie (to Hallescher FC until 30 June 2022)
—	FW	GER	Luc Ihorst (to Eintracht Braunschweig until 30 June 2022)
—	FW	GER	Justin Njinmah (to Borussia Dortmund II until 30 June 2023)

== Transfers ==
=== In ===
No.	Pos	Player	Transferred from	Fee	Date	Source
3	DF	(Germany) Anthony Jung	(Denmark) Brøndby IF	Free	1 July 2021	
26	DF	(Germany) Lars Lukas Mai	Bayern Munich	Loan	1 July 2021	
23	MF	(Germany) Nicolai Rapp	Union Berlin	€250,000	1 July 2021	
7	FW	(Germany) Marvin Ducksch	Hannover 96		25 August 2021	
15	FW	(Ivory Coast) Roger Assalé	Dijon	Loan	27 August 2021	
8	DF	(Germany) Mitchell Weiser	Bayer Leverkusen	Loan	31 August 2021	

=== Out ===
No.	Pos	Player	Transferred to	Fee	Date	Source
18	DF	(Finland) Niklas Moisander	(Sweden) Malmö FF	Free	1 July 2021	
7	FW	(Kosovo) Milot Rashica	(England) Norwich City	€11 million	1 July 2021	
23	DF	(Czech Republic) Theodor Gebre Selassie	(Czech Republic) Slovan Liberec	Free	1 July 2021	
9	FW	(Germany) Davie Selke	Hertha BSC	Loan return	1 July 2021	
29	MF	(Germany) Patrick Erras	Holstein Kiel		2 July 2021	
24	FW	(Germany) Johannes Eggestein	(Belgium) Antwerp		5 August 2021	
8	FW	(Japan) Yuya Osako	(Japan) Vissel Kobe		8 August 2021	
19	FW	(United States) Josh Sargent	(England) Norwich City	€9.5 million	9 August 2021	
18	GK	(Greece) Stefanos Kapino	Arminia Bielefeld		12 August 2021	
5	DF	(Sweden) Ludwig Augustinsson	(Spain) Sevilla		15 August 2021	
35	MF	(Germany) Maximilian Eggestein	SC Freiburg		18 August 2021	
6	MF	(Germany) Kevin Möhwald	Union Berlin		30 August 2021	

== Pre-season and friendlies ==
Win Draw Loss Fixtures

27 June 2021 Friendly	Blau-Weiß Lohne	0–7	Werder Bremen	Lohne, Germany
15:30 CEST (UTC+2)		Report	Bittencourt 11'; Füllkrug 15'; Dinkçi 19'; Schmidt 60', 80'; Philipp 71'; J. Eggestein 76'	Stadium: Heinz-Dettmer-Stadion

30 June 2021 Friendly	VfB Oldenburg	0–4	Werder Bremen	Oldenburg, Germany
18:30 CEST (UTC+2)		Report	Füllkrug 42'; Schmid 73', 82'; Woltemade 86'	Stadium: Marschweg-Stadion

4 July 2021 Friendly	Werder Bremen	1–0	CSKA Sofia	Zell am Ziller, Austria
16:00 CEST (UTC+2)	J. Eggestein 82'	Report		Stadium: Parkstadion Zell am Ziller

7 July 2021 Friendly	Werder Bremen	2–2	Zenit Saint Petersburg	Zell am Ziller, Austria
18:00 CEST (UTC+2)	Dinkçi 21'; Füllkrug 45+1' (pen.)	Report	Driussi 59'; Mostovoy 68'	Stadium: Parkstadion Zell am Ziller

13 July 2021 Friendly	FC Oberneuland	0–12	Werder Bremen	Bremen, Germany
18:30 CEST (UTC+2)		Report	Sargent 3', 35', 36'; Bittencourt 33' (pen.), 39', 46'; Schmid 29'; Füllkrug 68', 89'; Gruev 77'; Badjie 82', 94'	Stadium: Marko Mock Arena

17 July 2021 Friendly	Feyenoord	3–3	Werder Bremen	Rotterdam, Netherlands
12:00 CEST (UTC+2)	Bannis 4', 8'; Naujoks 80'	Report	Gruev 14'; J. Eggestein 22', 57'	Stadium: De Kuip

17 July 2021 Friendly	Feyenoord	2–1	Werder Bremen	Rotterdam, Netherlands
16:00 CEST (UTC+2)	Toornstra 7'; Linssen (yellow card) 56'; Kökçü 60' (pen.)	Report	Sargent 27'; Toprak (yellow card) 36'	Stadium: De Kuip

1 September 2021 Friendly	Werder Bremen	2–0	Heracles Almelo	Bremen, Germany
16:00 CEST (UTC+2)	Schönfelder 22'; Nankishi 56'	Report		Stadium: Weser-Stadion

5 January 2022 Friendly	Werder Bremen	3–0	Viktoria Berlin	Bremen, Germany
16:00 CET (UTC+1)	Park 16'; Ducksch 37' (pen.); Dinkçi 45'	Report		Stadium: Weserstadion Platz 11; Attendance: 0

8 January 2022 Friendly	Hannover 96	2–2	Werder Bremen	Hanover, Germany
12:30 CET (UTC+1)	Kerk 17'; Teuchert 34'	Report	Schmidt 25'; Ducksch 42'	Stadium: Eilenriedestadion; Attendance: 0 Referee: Franz Bokop

== Competitions ==
=== Overall record ===
Competition	First match	Last match	Starting round	Final position	Record							
Competition	First match	Last match	Starting round	Final position	Pld	W	D	L	GF	GA	GD	Win %
2. Bundesliga	24 July 2021	15 May 2022	Matchday 1	2nd	34	18	9	7	65	43	+22	52.94
DFB-Pokal	7 August 2021		First round	First round	1	0	0	1	0	2	−2	0.00
Total					35	18	9	8	65	45	+20	51.43

Source: Soccerway

=== 2. Bundesliga ===
==== League table ====
Pos	Team	Pld	W	D	L	GF	GA	GD	Pts	Promotion, qualification or relegation
1	Schalke 04 (C, P)	34	20	5	9	72	44	+28	65	Promotion to Bundesliga
2	Werder Bremen (P)	34	18	9	7	65	43	+22	63	Promotion to Bundesliga
3	Hamburger SV	34	16	12	6	67	35	+32	60	Qualification for promotion play-offs
4	Darmstadt 98	34	18	6	10	71	46	+25	60	
5	FC St. Pauli	34	16	9	9	61	46	+15	57	

Source: DFB
Rules for classification: 1) Points; 2) Goal difference; 3) Goals scored; 4) Head-to-head points; 5) Head-to-head goal difference; 6) Head-to-head away goals scored; 7) Away goals scored; 8) Play-off.
(C) Champions; (P) Promoted

==== Results summary ====
Overall								Home						Away					
Pld	W	D	L	GF	GA	GD	Pts	W	D	L	GF	GA	GD	W	D	L	GF	GA	GD
34	18	9	7	65	43	+22	63	8	6	3	29	17	+12	10	3	4	36	26	+10

Source: DFB

==== Results by round ====
Round	1	2	3	4	5	6	7	8	9	10	11	12	13	14	15	16	17	18	19	20	21	22	23	24	25	26	27	28	29	30	31	32	33	34
Ground	H	A	H	A	H	A	H	A	H	A	A	H	A	H	A	H	A	A	H	A	H	A	H	A	H	A	H	H	A	H	A	H	A	H
Result	D	W	L	D	W	W	L	L	W	L	D	D	W	D	L	W	W	W	W	W	W	W	D	W	W	L	W	D	D	D	W	L	W	W
Position	7	7	11	9	7	3	8	10	8	10	10	10	8	9	10	9	9	7	4	3	3	2	1	1	1	3	2	1	2	2	2	2	2	2

Source: DFB
A = Away; H = Home; W = Win; D = Draw; L = Loss

==== Matches ====
The league fixtures were announced on 25 June 2021.

24 July 2021 1	Werder Bremen	1–1	Hannover 96	Bremen
20:30 CEST (UTC+2)	Falette 49' (o.g.)	Report	Ducksch 55'	Stadium: Weserstadion; Attendance: 14,000; Referee: Robert Kampka

31 July 2021 2	Fortuna Düsseldorf	2–3	Werder Bremen	Düsseldorf
20:30 CEST (UTC+2)	Hennings 47'; Narey 90+4'	Report	Sargent 39', 64'; M. Eggestein 90+6' (pen.)	Stadium: Merkur Spiel-Arena; Attendance: 12850; Referee: Daniel Schlager

15 August 2021 3	Werder Bremen	1–4	SC Paderborn	Bremen
13:30 CEST (UTC+2)	Schmidt 52'	Report	Platte 9', 17'; Michel 36'; Schallenberg 55'	Stadium: Weserstadion; Attendance: 21.000; Referee: Martin Petersen

21 August 2021 4	Karlsruher SC	0–0	Werder Bremen	Karlsruhe
13:30 CEST (UTC+2)		Report		Stadium: Wildparkstadion; Attendance: 10,000; Referee: Bastian Dankert

29 August 2021 5	Werder Bremen	3–0	Hansa Rostock	Bremen
13:30 CEST (UTC+2)	Ducksch 39' (pen.), 53'; Rapp 90+4'	Report		Stadium: Weserstadion; Attendance: 21.050; Referee: Daniel Siebert

11 September 2021 6	FC Ingolstadt	0–3	Werder Bremen	Ingolstadt
13:30 CEST (UTC+2)	Röhl (yellow card) 36'	Report	Antonitsch 24' (o.g.); Weiser 42'; Ducksch 48'; Groß (yellow card) 70'; Rapp (yellow card) 79'	Stadium: Audi Sportpark; Attendance: 5,825; Referee: Tobias Welz

18 September 2021 7	Werder Bremen	0–2	Hamburger SV	Bremen
20:30 CEST (UTC+2)		Report	Glatzel 2'; Heyer 45+1'	Stadium: Weserstadion; Attendance: 21,000; Referee: Sascha Stegemann

26 September 2021 8	Dynamo Dresden	3–0	Werder Bremen	Dresden
13:30 CEST (UTC+2)	Daferner 40', 66'; Schröter 75'	Report		Stadium: Rudolf-Harbig-Stadion; Attendance: 16,000; Referee: Robert Hartmann

1 October 2021 9	Werder Bremen	3–0	1. FC Heidenheim	Bremen
18:30 CEST (UTC+2)	Friedl 50'; Ducksch 52'; Thomalla 64'	Report		Stadium: Weserstadion; Attendance: 30,000; Referee: Martin Petersen

17 October 2021 10	Darmstadt 98	3–0	Werder Bremen	Darmstadt
13:30 CEST (UTC+2)	Holland 45'; Pfeiffer 65', 71'	Report		Stadium: Merck-Stadion am Böllenfalltor; Attendance: 13,000; Referee: Florian Lechner

24 October 2021 11	SV Sandhausen	2–2	Werder Bremen	Sandhausen
13:30 CEST (UTC+2)		Report		Stadium: BWT-Stadion am Hardtwald

30 October 2021 12	Werder Bremen	1–1	FC St. Pauli	Bremen
13:30 CEST (UTC+2)		Report		Stadium: Weserstadion

5 November 2021 13	1. FC Nürnberg	1–2	Werder Bremen	Nuremberg
18:30 CET (UTC+1)		Report		Stadium: Max-Morlock-Stadion

20 November 2021 14	Werder Bremen	1–1	Schalke 04	Bremen
18:30 CET (UTC+1)		Report		Stadium: Weserstadion

27 November 2021 15	Holstein Kiel	2–1	Werder Bremen	Kiel
20:30 CET (UTC+1)		Report		Stadium: Holstein-Stadion

3 December 2021 16	Werder Bremen	4–0	Erzgebirge Aue	Bremen
18:30 CET (UTC+1)		Report		Stadium: Weserstadion

10 December 2021 17	Jahn Regensburg	2–3	Werder Bremen	Regensburg
18:30 CET (UTC+1)		Report		Stadium: Jahnstadion Regensburg

19 December 2021 18	Hannover 96	1–4	Werder Bremen	Hanover
13:30 CET (UTC+1)		Report		Stadium: HDI-Arena

15 January 2022 19	Werder Bremen	3–0	Fortuna Düsseldorf	Bremen
13:30 CET (UTC+1)		Report		Stadium: Weserstadion

22 January 2022 20	SC Paderborn	3–4	Werder Bremen	Paderborn
13:30 CET (UTC+1)		Report		Stadium: Benteler-Arena

5 February 2022 21	Werder Bremen	2–1	Karlsruher SC	Bremen
13:30 CET (UTC+1)	Ducksch 51'; Jung 76'	Report	Hofmann 59'	Stadium: Weserstadion

11 February 2022 22	Hansa Rostock	1–2	Werder Bremen	Rostock
18:30 CET (UTC+1)	Meißner 83'	Report	Ducksch 54'; Füllkrug 74'	Stadium: Ostseestadion

19 February 2022 23	Werder Bremen	1–1	FC Ingolstadt	Bremen
13:30 CET (UTC+1)	Füllkrug 74'	Report	Bilbija 85'	Stadium: Weserstadion; Referee: Robert Kampka

27 February 2022 24	Hamburger SV	2–3	Werder Bremen	Hamburg
13:30 CET (UTC+1)	Meffert 46'; Glatzel 80'	Report	Ducksch 10' (pen.), 76'; Füllkrug 51' (pen.)	Stadium: Volksparkstadion; Referee: Daniel Siebert

6 March 2022 25	Werder Bremen	2–1	Dynamo Dresden	Bremen
13:30 CET (UTC+1)	Füllkrug 16', 44'	Report	Königsdörffer 2'	Stadium: Weserstadion; Referee: Martin Thomsen

12 March 2022 26	1. FC Heidenheim	2–1	Werder Bremen	Heidenheim
20:30 CET (UTC+1)		Report		Stadium: Voith-Arena; Referee: Benjamin Cortus

19 March 2022 27	Werder Bremen	1–0	Darmstadt 98	Bremen
20:30 CET (UTC+1)	Füllkrug 52'	Report		Stadium: Weserstadion; Referee: Robert Schröder

3 April 2022 28	Werder Bremen	1–1	SV Sandhausen	Bremen
13:30 CEST (UTC+2)		Report		Stadium: Weserstadion; Referee: Robert Wessel

9 April 2022 29	FC St. Pauli	1–1	Werder Bremen	Hamburg
13:30 CEST (UTC+2)		Report		Stadium: Millerntor-Stadion; Referee: Florian Badstübner

17 April 2022 30	Werder Bremen	1–1	1. FC Nürnberg	Bremen
13:30 CEST (UTC+2)	Weiser 64' (Friedl); Bittencourt (yellow card) 71'; Friedl (yellow card) 87'	Report	Dovedan 24' (pen.); Tempelmann (yellow card) 72'	Stadium: Weserstadion; Attendance: 30,000; Referee: Christian Dingert

23 April 2022 31	FC Schalke 04	1–4	Werder Bremen	Gelsenkirchen
13:30 CEST (UTC+2)	Windheim (yellow card) 31'; Drexler (yellow card) 37'; Terodde 88' (Churlinov)	Report	Rapp (yellow card) 6'; Gruev 9'; Füllkrug 26' (Weiser); Ducksch 51' (Füllkrug) 53' (Bittencourt); Jung (yellow card) 67'; Bittencourt (yellow card) 84'	Stadium: Veltins-Arena; Attendance: 62,271; Referee: Deniz Aytekin

29 April 2022 32	Werder Bremen	2–3	Holstein Kiel	Bremen
18:30 CEST (UTC+2)	Füllkrug 2' (Weiser); Ducksch 23' (pen.); Weiser (yellow card) 45'; Schmid (yellow card) 67'	Report	Lorenz (yellow card) 23'; Füllkrug 45+2' (o.g.); Mühling (yellow card) 56'; Jung 71' (o.g.); Korb (yellow card) 82' (goal) 85'; Arslan (yellow card) 90+1'	Stadium: Weserstadion; Attendance: 42,100; Referee: Frank Willenborg

8 May 2022 33	FC Erzgebirge Aue	0–3	Werder Bremen	Aue-Bad Schlema
13:30 CEST (UTC+2)	Carlson (yellow card) 15'; Jonjić (yellow card) 48'	Report	Bittencourt (yellow card) 44'; Friedl 49' (Bittencourt); Jung (yellow card) 89'; Füllkrug 90+2' (Schmidt); Schmidt 90+6' (Füllkrug)	Stadium: Erzgebirgsstadion; Attendance: 12,360; Referee: Benjamin Brand

15 May 2022 34	Werder Bremen	2–0	SSV Jahn Regensburg	Bremen
15:30 CEST (UTC+2)	Füllkrug 10'; Ducksch 51'	Report		Stadium: Weserstadion; Referee: Felix Zwayer

=== DFB-Pokal ===
7 August 2021 First round	VfL Osnabrück	2–0	Werder Bremen	Osnabrück
15:30 CEST (UTC+2)	Kleinhansl (yellow card) 41'; Trapp 45'; Higl (yellow card) 86'; Köhler 90+6', (yellow card) 90+6'	Report	Schmid (yellow card) 19'; Toprak (yellow card) 54'; Friedl (yellow card) 68'; Zetterer (yellow card) 82'	Stadium: Stadion an der Bremer Brücke; Attendance: 5,341; Referee: Patrick Ittrich

== Statistics ==
=== Goalscorers ===
As of 15 May 2022

Rank	Pos.	No.	Player	2. Bundesliga	DFB-Pokal	Total
1	FW	7	(Germany) Marvin Ducksch	20	0	20
2	FW	11	(Germany) Niclas Füllkrug	19	0	19
3	DF	32	(Austria) Marco Friedl	4	0	4
4	DF	3	(Germany) Anthony Jung	3	0	3
Total				65	0	65
