= Ilia Gruev (footballer, born 2000) =

Bulgarian footballer (born 2000)

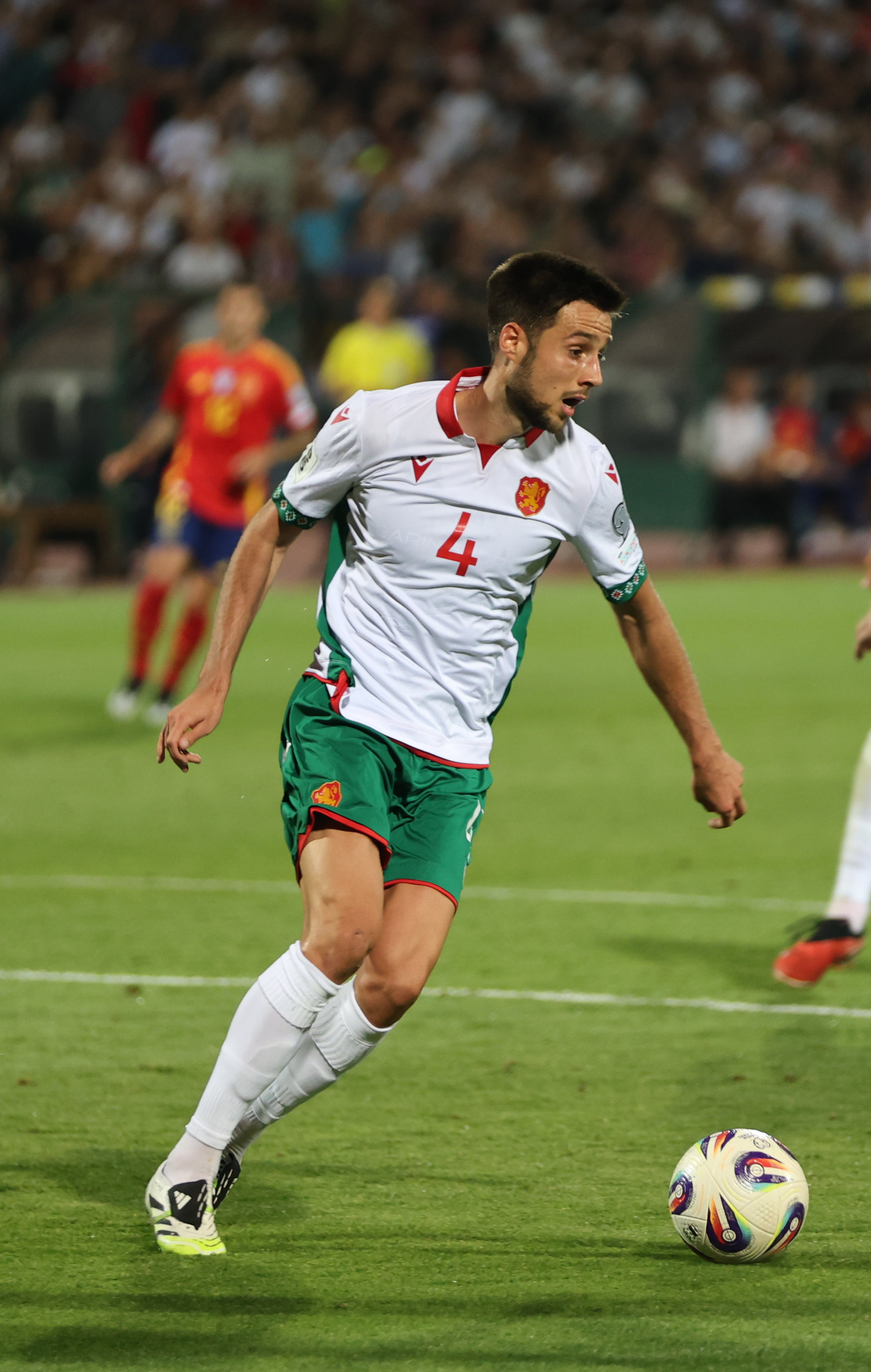
- Gruev with Bulgaria in 2025

Personal information
- Full name: Ilia Iliev Gruev
- Date of birth: 6 May 2000 (age 26)
- Place of birth: Sofia, Bulgaria
- Height: 1.85 m (6 ft 1 in)
- Position: Defensive midfielder

Team information
- Current team: Leeds United
- Number: 44

Youth career
- –2015: Rot-Weiß Erfurt
- 2015–2019: Werder Bremen

Senior career*
Years	Team	Apps	(Gls)
2019–2021	Werder Bremen II	19	(2)
2020–2023	Werder Bremen	59	(1)
2023–	Leeds United	75	(0)

International career^{‡}
2016	Bulgaria U17	3	(1)
2017	Bulgaria U18	5	(0)
2017	Bulgaria U19	2	(0)
2021–2022	Bulgaria U21	14	(1)
2022–	Bulgaria	33	(0)
- * Club domestic league appearances and goals as of 18:14, 16 April 2026 (UTC) ‡ National team caps and goals as of 20:09, 16 November 2026 (UTC)

Ilia Iliev Gruev (Bulgarian: Илия Илиев Груев; born 6 May 2000) is a Bulgarian professional footballer who plays as a defensive midfielder for Premier League club Leeds United and the Bulgaria national team.

== Club career ==
=== Werder Bremen ===
After playing youth football for Rot-Weiß Erfurt, Gruev moved to Werder Bremen in 2015. Gruev progressed through Bremen's youth teams, eventually becoming captain of the club's under-19 side before signing his first professional contract with the club in April 2019.

Gruev made his professional debut for Werder Bremen in the second round of the 2020–21 DFB-Pokal on 23 December 2020, coming on as a substitute in the 87th minute for Jean-Manuel Mbom against Hannover 96. The away match finished as a 3–0 win for Bremen.

He scored the first goal of his senior career in a 4–1 win over Schalke 04 in April 2022, with a close-range header to put Bremen 1–0 up. Werder Bremen were promoted to the Bundesliga at the end of the season, after finishing 2nd with 63 points. Gruev extended his contract with Werder Bremen in summer 2022.

The start of the 2022–23 season saw Gruev continue to play regularly for Bremen, appearing in 11 of their first 12 Bundesliga matches.

=== Leeds United ===
==== 2023–24 season ====
On 31 August 2023, Gruev signed for EFL Championship club Leeds United on a four-year deal for an undisclosed fee. Gruev struggled to break into Leeds' first team in the first half of the season, being limited to just two league starts in 2023, both of which were in a box-to-box midfielder role rather than as a deep-lying midfielder, due to the form of Ethan Ampadu in that role. In his third league start of the season, an injury to centre-back Pascal Struijk allowed Gruev to be given a start as a deep-lying midfielder in a 3–0 win against Cardiff City in January 2024 – Gruev was voted man of the match, having completed 68 out of 70 passes, giving him a 97% passing accuracy, a record for a Leeds player (who recorded 50+ passes) since the statistic was first measured in the 2013–14 season. Gruev scored his first and only goal of the season, a free kick in the second leg of Leeds' 4–0 play-off semi-final win against Norwich City at Elland Road. However, Leeds were unable to secure promotion back to the Premier League at the first attempt following a defeat to Southampton in the play-off final in May 2024.

==== 2024–25 season ====
Having been named in the starting line-ups for most of the season so far, Gruev sustained an injury at Norwich City necessitating surgery to repair meniscus damage in early October 2024. Gruev returned to play as a late substitute in an FA Cup third round home win over Harrogate Town in January 2025. In May, Gruev won the 2024–25 EFL Championship title with Leeds following a late win over Plymouth Argyle at Home Park. Gruev finished the season with two assists, appearing in 23 league matches.

==== 2025–26 season ====
On 6 February 2026, Ilia Gruev recorded his first senior and Premier League match with two assists in a 3–1 win against Nottingham Forest at Elland Road. He became the first player to record two assists in a Premier League match for Leeds United since Pablo Hernandez in December 2020.

== International career ==
Gruev has appeared for the Bulgaria under-17, under-18, under-19 and under-21 national teams. He received his first call-up for the senior national team on 5 September 2022, for the games of the UEFA Nations League games against Gibraltar and North Macedonia on 23 and 26 September 2022. He made his debut in the match against Gibraltar on 23 September, won 5–1 by Bulgaria.

== Personal life ==
Gruev was born in Sofia, but moved to Erfurt in Germany after a few weeks, he also holds German citizenship. He is the son of Iliya Gruev, former footballer and current manager.

== Career statistics ==
=== Club ===
As of match played 18 April 2026

Appearances and goals by club, season and competition
Club	Season	League			National cup (Note: Includes DFB-Pokal, FA Cup)		League cup (Note: Includes EFL Cup)		Other		Total	
Club	Season	Division	Apps	Goals	Apps	Goals	Apps	Goals	Apps	Goals	Apps	Goals
Werder Bremen II	2019–20	Regionalliga Nord	15	2	—		—		—		15	2
Werder Bremen II	2020–21	Regionalliga Nord	4	0	—		—		—		4	0
Werder Bremen II	Total		19	2	—		—		0	0	19	2
Werder Bremen	2020–21	Bundesliga	1	0	2	0	—		—		3	0
Werder Bremen	2021–22	2. Bundesliga	26	1	0	0	—		—		26	1
Werder Bremen	2022–23	Bundesliga	31	0	1	0	—		—		32	0
Werder Bremen	2023–24	Bundesliga	1	0	0	0	—		—		1	0
Werder Bremen	Total		59	1	3	0	—		0	0	62	1
Leeds United	2023–24	Championship	29	0	3	0	0	0	3 (Note: Appearances in Championship play-offs)	1	35	1
Leeds United	2024–25	Championship	23	0	1	0	1	0	—		25	0
Leeds United	2025–26	Premier League	23	0	2	0	1	0	—		26	0
Leeds United	Total		75	0	6	0	2	0	3	1	86	1
Career total			153	3	8	0	2	0	3	1	167	4

=== International ===
As of match played 16 November 2026

Appearances and goals by national team and year
National team	Year	Apps	Goals
Bulgaria	2022	4	0
Bulgaria	2023	10	0
Bulgaria	2024	4	0
Bulgaria	2025	9	0
Bulgaria	2026	6	0
Total		33	0

== Honours ==
Leeds United

- EFL Championship: 2024–25

Individual

- Bulgarian Footballer of the Year: 2025; runner-up: 2022, 2023, 2024
