= Christian Groß =

German footballer (born 1989)

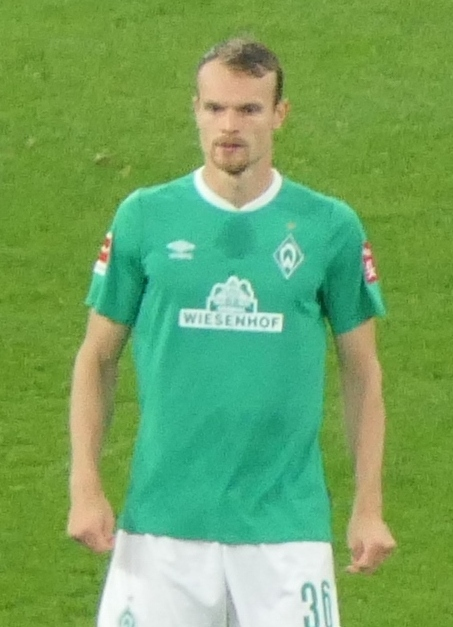
- Groß with Werder Bremen in 2019

Personal information
- Date of birth: 8 February 1989 (age 37)
- Place of birth: Bremen, West Germany
- Height: 1.82 m (6 ft 0 in)
- Positions: Defensive midfielder; centre back

Youth career
- SC Sternbusch
- BV Cloppenburg
- –2006: VfL Osnabrück
- 2006–2008: Hamburger SV

Senior career*
Years	Team	Apps	(Gls)
2008–2011	Hamburger SV II	67	(7)
2009–2011	Hamburger SV	0	(0)
2011–2013	SV Babelsberg 03	50	(2)
2013–2014	Sportfreunde Lotte	35	(1)
2014–2018	VfL Osnabrück	132	(5)
2018–2019	Werder Bremen II	31	(9)
2019–2024	Werder Bremen	110	(1)
Total		425	(25)

International career
2010	Germany U20	1	(0)
- * Club domestic league appearances and goals

Christian Groß (born 8 February 1989) is a German former professional footballer who played as a defensive midfielder or centre back.

== Career ==
After playing in the youth team of VfL Osnabrück for a year, Groß joined the youth department of Hamburger SV in 2006, at the age of 17. After two years in the Hamburg under-19 team, he was promoted to Hamburger SV II in 2008, which played in the Regionalliga Nord. He became a regular in the defensive midfield in the second half of the season, and was given a professional contract for the following season. He trained with the first team and was one of the most important players in the second team, but never made an appearance in the Bundesliga. During his time at Hamburg II, he was called up to the German under-20 national team, where he made a brief appearance in a friendly against Italy on 7 April 2010.

In 2011, he decided to leave Hamburger SV and joined SV Babelsberg 03. He made his first appearance in professional football on 23 July 2011, the first matchday of the 2011–12 3. Liga. For the 2014–15 season, he moved to his youth club VfL Osnabrück, where he was a regular in the defensive midfield and was the team's captain from 2016 onwards. He joined fourth-division club Werder Bremen II for the 2018–19 season, where he was also named team captain and, as one of the few older players in the under-23 team, had the task of passing on his experience to the young talents.

In the pre-season of the 2019–20 season, Groß trained with the Werder Bremen first team. He was called up as a centre-back as there were not enough players available for this position due to injuries. After good training and test match performances, Groß debuted in an official match for Bremen's first team on 11 August 2019 in a 6−1 win against Atlas Delmenhorst in the first round of the DFB Cup. On 1 September, he made his Bundesliga debut at the age of 30, coming on as a substitute in a 3−2 win over FC Augsburg. With now five Werder defenders injured, he played the next four league games as a centre back. The original plan to reassign him to the second team at some point during the season was ultimately scrapped because of his good performances. In the 2019−20 season, Groß played a total of 14 Bundesliga matches, appearing just once for the second team.

Groß remained part of the Bundesliga squad in the 2020–21 season and was now regularly deployed in both central defence and defensive midfield, making 23 appearances in total. At the end of the season, Werder Bremen were relegated to the 2. Bundesliga. In June 2021, Groß was the first player of the Bremen squad to announce that he would continue to play for Werder Bremen in the second division. At the end of the 2021–22 season, the club was promoted back to the first division, with Groß appearing in 27 league matches.

In March 2024, Groß announced his intention to end his playing career at the end of the 2023–24 season. On 18 May 2024, he played his last Bundesliga match against VfL Bochum. Starting from September 2024, he will work in the scouting department of Bayer Leverkusen.

Groß returned to Werder Bremen on 1 July 2025, signing a contract to become an assistant coach under Horst Steffen.

== Career statistics ==
Appearances and goals by club, season and competition
Club	Season	League			DFB-Pokal		Other		Total		Ref.
Club	Season	Division	Apps	Goals	Apps	Goals	Apps	Goals	Apps	Goals	Ref.
Hamburger SV II	2008–09	Regionalliga Nord	18	1	—		—		18	1	
Hamburger SV II	2009–10	Regionalliga Nord	29	3	—		—		29	3	
Hamburger SV II	2010–11	Regionalliga Nord	20	3	—		—		20	3	
Hamburger SV II	Total		67	7	0	0	0	0	67	7	—
SV Babelsberg 03	2011–12	3. Liga	13	0	1	0	—		14	0	
SV Babelsberg 03	2012–13	3. Liga	37	2	0	0	—		37	2	
SV Babelsberg 03	Total		50	2	1	0	0	0	51	2	—
Sportfreunde Lotte	2013–14	Regionalliga West	35	1	0	0	0	0	35	1	
VfL Osnabrück	2014–15	3. Liga	34	0	0	0	–		34	0	
VfL Osnabrück	2015–16	3. Liga	37	4	1	0	—		38	4	
VfL Osnabrück	2016–17	3. Liga	26	1	0	0	—		26	1	
VfL Osnabrück	2017–18	3. Liga	35	0	2	1	—		37	1	
VfL Osnabrück	Total		132	5	3	1	0	0	135	6	—
Werder Bremen II	2018–19	Regionalliga Nord	30	9	–		—		30	9	
Werder Bremen II	2019–20	Regionalliga Nord	1	0	–		–		1	0	
Werder Bremen II	Total		31	9	0	0	0	0	31	9	—
Werder Bremen	2019–20	Bundesliga	14	0	1	0	2 (Note: Appearances in the Bundesliga relegation play-offs)	0	17	0	
Werder Bremen	2020–21	Bundesliga	23	0	3	0	—		26	0	
Werder Bremen	2021–22	2. Bundesliga	27	0	0	0	—		27	0	
Werder Bremen	2022–23	Bundesliga	26	1	1	0	—		27	1	
Werder Bremen	2023–24	Bundesliga	20	0	1	0	—		21	0	
Werder Bremen	Total		110	1	6	0	2	0	118	1	—
Career total			425	25	10	1	2	0	437	26	—
