= Kevin Möhwald =

German footballer

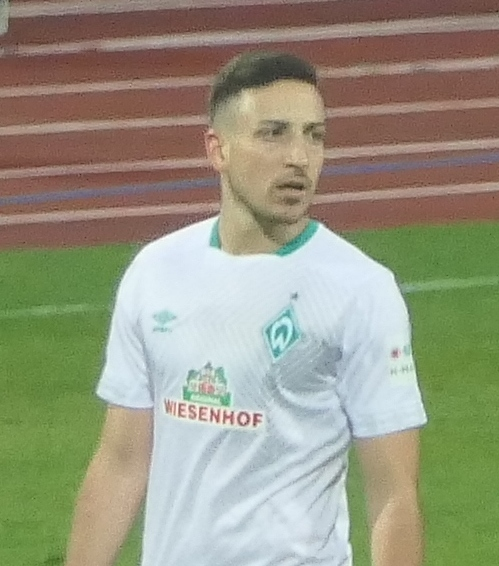
- Möhwald with Werder Bremen in 2019

Personal information
- Date of birth: 3 July 1993 (age 33)
- Place of birth: Erfurt, Germany
- Height: 1.82 m (6 ft 0 in)
- Position: Midfielder

Youth career
- 2001–2011: Rot-Weiß Erfurt

Senior career*
Years	Team	Apps	(Gls)
2011–2015	Rot-Weiß Erfurt	103	(12)
2015–2018	1. FC Nürnberg	87	(12)
2018–2021	Werder Bremen	52	(8)
2020	Werder Bremen II	1	(0)
2021–2023	Union Berlin	16	(0)
2023–2026	Eupen	52	(3)

International career^{‡}
2013	Germany U20	2	(0)
- * Club domestic league appearances and goals as of 20 April 2026 ‡ National team caps and goals as of 15 July 2014

Kevin Möhwald (born 3 July 1993) is a German professional footballer who plays as a midfielder.

== Career ==
Möhwald made his debut for Rot-Weiß Erfurt in December 2011, as a substitute for Nils Pfingsten-Reddig in a Thuringia derby against Carl Zeiss Jena which Erfurt lost 1–0.

In May 2018, Werder Bremen announced Möhwald would join the club for the 2018–19 season, moving on a free transfer from 1. FC Nürnberg.

Möhwald moved to Bundesliga club Union Berlin on 30 August 2021.

In June 2023, Möhwald signed for Belgian Pro League club Eupen on a three-year contract.

== Career statistics ==
As of match played on 31 August 2021

Appearances and goals by club, season and competition
Club	Season	League			Cup		Other		Total	
Club	Season	Division	Apps	Goals	Apps	Goals	Apps	Goals	Apps	Goals
Rot-Weiß Erfurt	2011–12	3. Liga	5	0	0	0	0	0	5	0
Rot-Weiß Erfurt	2012–13	3. Liga	35	2	0	0	0	0	35	2
Rot-Weiß Erfurt	2013–14	3. Liga	28	2	0	0	0	0	28	2
Rot-Weiß Erfurt	2014–15	3. Liga	35	8	0	0	0	0	35	8
Rot-Weiß Erfurt	Total		103	12	0	0	0	0	103	12
1. FC Nürnberg	2015–16	2. Bundesliga	27	1	3	0	0	0	30	1
1. FC Nürnberg	2016–17	2. Bundesliga	29	4	0	0	0	0	29	4
1. FC Nürnberg	2017–18	2. Bundesliga	31	7	3	0	0	0	34	7
1. FC Nürnberg	Total		87	12	6	0	0	0	93	12
Werder Bremen	2018–19	Bundesliga	23	3	4	0	0	0	27	3
Werder Bremen	2019–20	Bundesliga	1	0	1	0	0	0	2	0
Werder Bremen	2020–21	Bundesliga	27	5	3	1	0	0	30	6
Werder Bremen	2021–22	2. Bundesliga	1	0	0	0	0	0	1	0
Werder Bremen	Total		52	8	8	1	0	0	60	9
Werder Bremen II	2020–21	Regionalliga Nord	1	0	–		–		1	0
Career total			243	32	14	1	0	0	257	33
