= 2024 EFL Championship play-off final =

Association football match in London

- Wembley Stadium in London hosted the final.
Leeds United	Southampton
0	1
- Date: 26 May 2024
- Venue: Wembley Stadium, London
- Man of the Match: Adam Armstrong (Southampton)
- Referee: John Brooks
- Attendance: 85,862

The 2024 EFL Championship play-off final was an association football match which was played on 26 May 2024 at Wembley Stadium in London, England, between Leeds United and Southampton.

The match was to determine the third and final team to gain promotion from the EFL Championship, the second tier of English football, to the Premier League. Leeds United and Southampton had finished third and fourth respectively in the league season. The top two teams of the 2023–24 EFL Championship, Leicester City and Ipswich Town, gained automatic promotion to the Premier League, while the clubs placed from third to sixth in the table took part in 2024 English Football League play-offs. Promotion to the Premier League was estimated in 2024 to be worth up to £265 million to the play-off final winner.

John Brooks was the referee for the match, which was played in front of 85,862 spectators. Southampton took the lead in the 24th minute through Adam Armstrong. No more goals were scored and Southampton won the match 1–0, thus securing promotion back to the Premier League.

== Route to the final ==
Final league position – Championship
Pos	Team	Pld	W	D	L	GF	GA	GD	Pts
1	Leicester City	46	31	4	11	89	41	+48	97
2	Ipswich Town	46	28	12	6	92	57	+35	96
3	Leeds United	46	27	9	10	81	43	+38	90
4	Southampton	46	26	9	11	87	63	+24	87
5	West Bromwich Albion	46	21	12	13	70	47	+23	75
6	Norwich City	46	21	10	15	79	64	+14	73

Leeds United finished the regular 2023–24 season in third place in the EFL Championship, the second tier of the English football league system. They were six points behind second-placed Ipswich Town and seven points behind champions Leicester City. Southampton finished in fourth place, nine points behind Ipswich Town. Fifth and sixth-placed West Bromwich Albion and Norwich City finished 21 and 23 points respectively behind Ipswich Town. They all therefore missed out on the two automatic places for promotion to the Premier League and instead took part in the play-offs to determine the third and final promoted team.

The first legs of the semi-finals took place on 12 May, contested between Norwich City and Leeds United at Carrow Road, and between West Bromwich Albion and Southampton at The Hawthorns. Both games finished in goalless draws, which was the first time that had happened since the 2011 Football League Championship play-offs semi-final first-legs between Nottingham Forest, Swansea City, Reading and Cardiff City.

The return leg between Leeds United and Norwich City was played at Elland Road on 16 May. Attacking their opponents from the kick-off, Leeds' Crysencio Summerville curled a shot over the bar after only two minutes. Leeds were later awarded a free-kick after a foul on Joe Rodon, which Ilia Gruev took; he deceived Norwich goalkeeper Angus Gunn into expecting a cross, but instead shot towards the near post to make it 1–0 in the seventh minute. In the 20th minute, Leeds made it 2–0 after Joël Piroe headed in a cross from Wilfried Gnonto. Georginio Rutter made it 3–0 in the 40th minute, crashing the ball into the net off of the crossbar after a breakaway Leeds' attack. Summerville made it 4–0 in the 68th minute, tapping the ball in from close range after Gnonto's shot had been parried by Gunn to Junior Firpo who squared the ball to Summerville. No further goals were scored as Leeds won the tie 4–0 on aggregate to make the play-off final on 26 May. Following the match, the Leeds squad gathered into a huddle in the centre circle while the home fans in the stands sang "I Predict a Riot" by Leeds band Kaiser Chiefs. Norwich manager David Wagner said after the game, "It was a poor performance from us. Everything you should not do, we have done". He was sacked by the club the day after the match.

The second leg between Southampton and West Bromwich Albion was played at St Mary's Stadium on 17 May. Southampton opened the scoring in the second half in the 49th minute as Will Smallbone struck the ball from an angle to put it past West Brom goalkeeper Alex Palmer and give his team a 1–0 advantage. Adam Armstrong later made it 2–0 in the 78th minute. In the 85th minute, Southampton were awarded a penalty kick for a foul on Ryan Manning, which Armstrong converted to put his side 3–0 up. Cédric Kipré scored a header in injury time to give West Brom a consolation goal, but Southampton won 3–1 on aggregate to qualify for the play-off final.

At the end of the Southampton–West Bromwich Albion game, a section of Southampton supporters came onto the pitch and confronted the West Bromwich supporters. Flares, seats and missiles were thrown between the two sets of fans before police and stewards gained control. A post-match lap of honour by the Southampton players had to be cancelled due to crowd disturbances. Three people were arrested, two for going on the pitch and one for assaulting an emergency worker, using threatening behaviour and obstructing/resisting a police officer.

== Match ==
=== Background ===
This was Leeds' first play-off final since the 2008 Football League One play-off final against Doncaster Rovers, while this was Southampton's first-ever play-off final. This saw both of the other relegated teams from the previous Premier League season face-off against each other with both looking for an immediate return to the Premier League. Leeds had also lost the 1987 Football League Second Division play-off final to Charlton Athletic, the 2006 Football League Championship play-off final to Watford, the 2009 Football League One play-off semi-finals to fierce rivals Millwall, and the 2019 EFL Championship play-off semi-finals to Derby County. Leeds had gone on an 15-match unbeaten run starting with a 3–0 home win over Birmingham City on 1 January 2024 and concluding on 6 April 2024 with a 2–1 away defeat to Coventry City and Southampton went on an 22-match unbeaten run starting with 3–1 home win over Leeds United on 30 September 2023 and ending with a 3–1 away defeat to Bristol City on 13 February 2024. Crysencio Summerville was Leeds United's leading scorer with 19 goals and Adam Armstrong was Southampton's leading scorer with 21 goals. During the regular season both meetings ended in Southampton wins, the first a 3–1 win at St Mary's Stadium and the second a final day 2–1 win at Elland Road the latter sealing Ipswich Town's promotion as runners-up to Leicester City. On 19 May 2024, it was announced that Summerville had been named in the EA Sports FC 24 Championship Team of the Season.

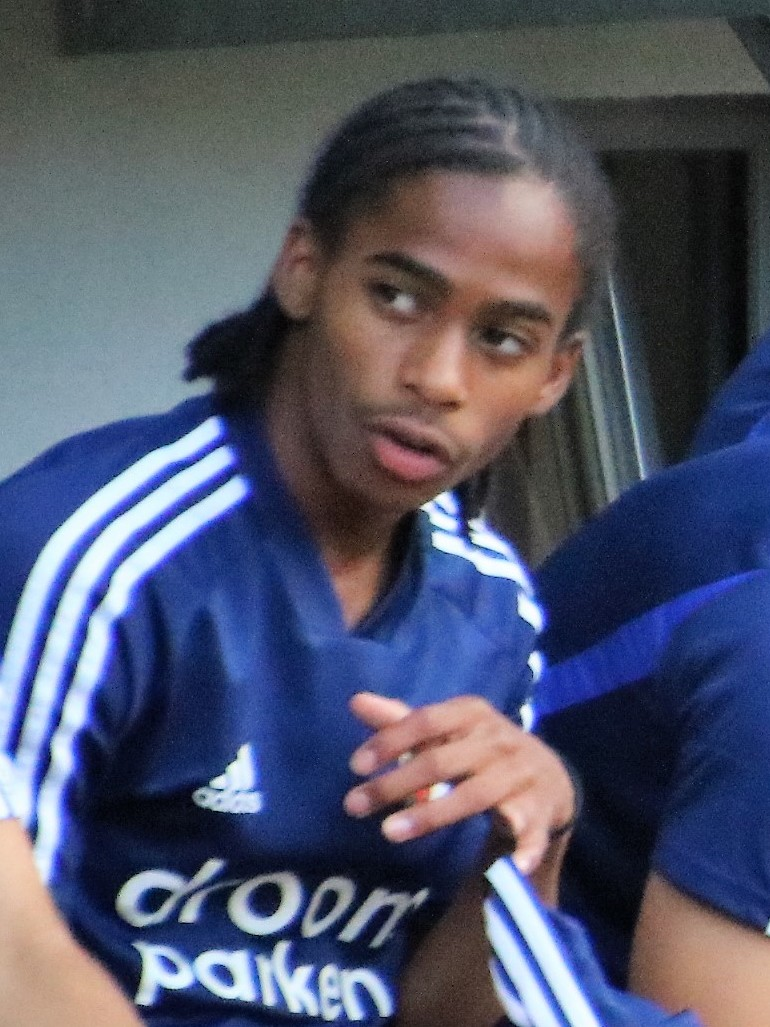
As well as being Leeds United's top goalscorer Crysencio Summerville also won the 2023–24 EFL Championship Player of the Year award and was named in the team of the season alongside Southampton's Kyle Walker-Peters.

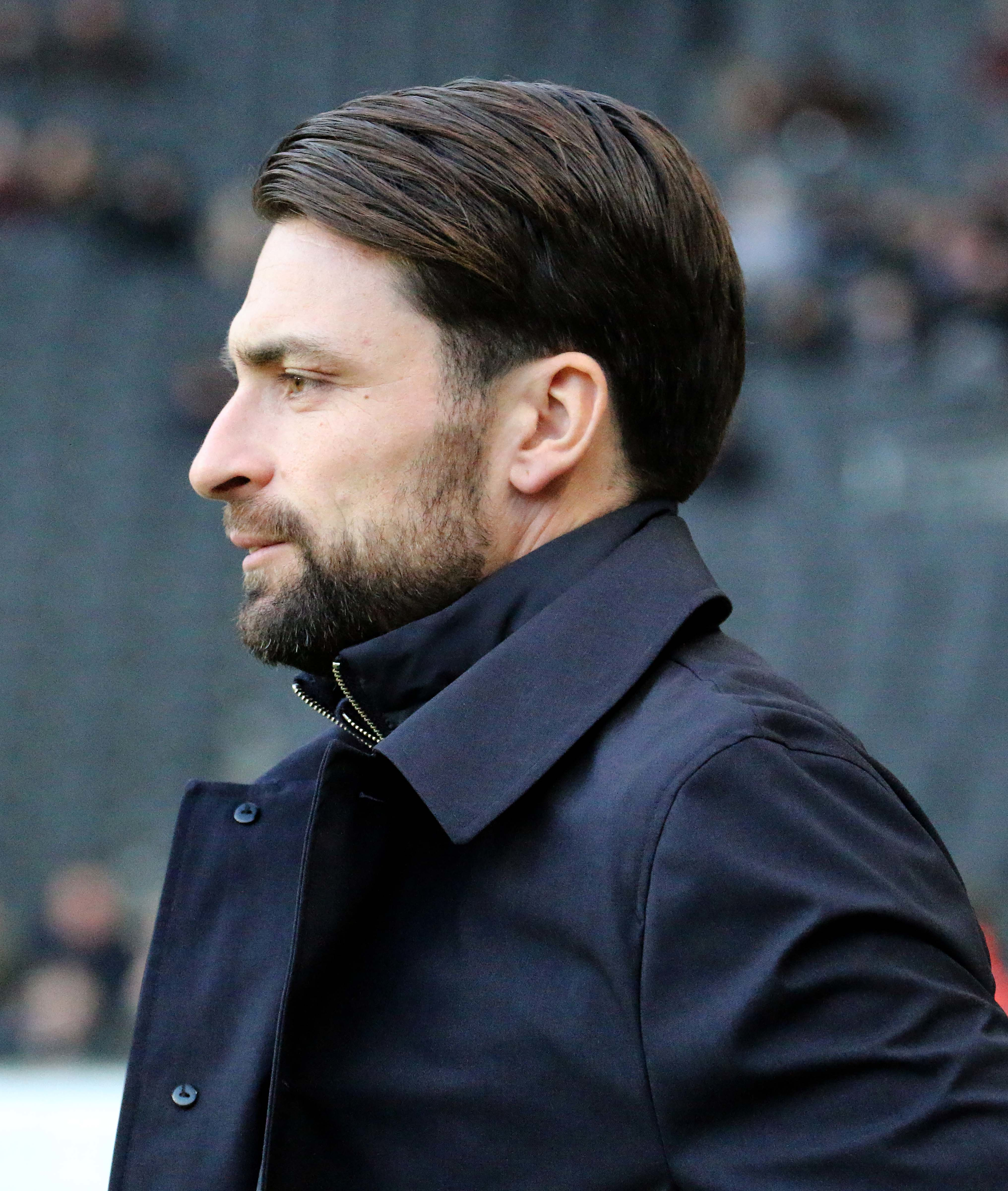
This was Southampton manager Russell Martin's first play-off final

Leeds were allocated 35,796 tickets for the final at the east end of Wembley Stadium. Southampton were allocated an initial 35,667 tickets on the west side, rising to 36,900 on 22 May 2024. The British Transport Police (BTP) will have an "enhanced policing presence" due to rival fans of Manchester United (who played Manchester derby rivals Manchester City in the 2024 FA Cup final the day before) and Leeds United being around Wembley in the same 24-hour period with the BTP saying "The safety of rail passengers remains the force's top priority and there will be an enhanced policing presence and specialist resources deployed across the rail network throughout that weekend".

Prime Minister Rishi Sunak attended the final in his role as a Southampton fan following his attendance at St Mary's for the semi-final second leg against West Brom with Leeds chairman Paraag Marathe attending with other representatives of the San Francisco 49ers with speculation that new part-owner American actor and comedian Will Ferrell might attend.

=== Coverage ===
The match was televised live by Sky Sports on both its Football and Main Event channels and was also available for live streaming on Sky Go and NOW. BBC Local Radio stations covered the game for each team: BBC Radio Leeds for Leeds United and BBC Radio Solent for Southampton. Talksport provided the national radio commentary with Adrian Durham.

=== Summary ===
==== First-half ====
Leeds kicked-off the match at 15:00 in front of 85,862 fans in heavy rain. In the 5th minute, Crysencio Summerville was fouled by Flynn Downes just outside the Southampton penalty area and he delivered a free-kick towards the back post where Joe Rodon won the initial header but Jack Stephens cleared it away from danger. Taylor Harwood-Bellis fired a pass to Will Smallbone in the 9th minute who flicked the ball to David Brooks and he won a free-kick for Southampton after foul on him by Junior Firpo. In the 13th minute, Rodon made a challenge on Joe Aribo just outside the Leeds penalty area and they won another free-kick which Smallbone took but Illan Meslier palmed it behind for a corner kick. In the 19th minute, Summerville played a one-two with Ilia Gruev and he looked to find Wilfried Gnonto but it was intercepted by the Saints. However, Leeds won the ball back and Georginio Rutter looked to pick out Glen Kamara but Summerville fouled Brooks and gave away a free-kick. In the 22nd minute, Joël Piroe then flicked the ball out to Rutter who found Archie Gray on the right-hand side and crossed it into the penalty but Firpo failed to reach his cross. The scoring was opened in the 24th minute when Downes played a pass to Smallbone who slotted a through-ball behind Leeds defence and Adam Armstrong slotted it past Meslier in the bottom corner. In the 26th minute, the Saints looked to increase their lead with Armstrong finding Brooks who picked out Downes and he again found Armstrong who passed it onto Kyle Walker-Peters who looked to take on Firpo who deflected it behind for a Saints corner kick. Leeds cleared the resulting corner kick and Gray carried it forward but Southampton won back possession. In the 35th minute, Russell Martin was forced into making his first change of the match with Samuel Edozie replacing the injured Brooks. Jan Bednarek was shown the first yellow card of the match for a challenge on Rutter in the 38th minute. Leeds tried to find an equaliser just before the half-time interval with Kamara firing a pass out wide to Gray who won a throw-in which was played to Summerville who drove into the Southampton penalty area but his cross was deflected behind for a Leeds corner kick by Walker-Peters. In the 43rd minute, Summerville received a booking for a challenge on Harwood-Bellis and Ryan Fraser was booked in the 45th minute for bringing down Gnonto. In the last minute of first-half regulation time Southampton won a free-kick, which Smallbone clipped over the wall towards Armstrong who took a shot but Meslier saved it and Rodon cleared the ball out of danger. The first-half came to an end with the Saints leading 1–0.

==== Second-half ====
Southampton kicked-off the second half with an early opportunity for the Saints in the 48th minute with Edozie cutting it back to Stephens but his shot was blocked. In the 50th minute, Rodon drove into the Saints penalty area before poking a through-ball to Gnonto. He flicked it back to Rodon where his strike was blocked but it fell to Summerville where his shot went just wide of the post. A minute later, Harwood-Bellis was the latest player to be booked for a foul on Rutter with Summerville delivering the resulting free-kick which was put behind for a corner kick which Leeds played short before crossing it towards the back post where Aribo headed it away from danger. In the 66th minute, Daniel Farke made Leeds first change of the afternoon with Daniel James replacing Gnonto. In the 68th minute, Aribo had the opportunity to advance before slotting a ball to Edozie who drove into the penalty area but he failed to hit the target. Martin made Southampton's second change of the match in the 70th minute with Ché Adams replacing Fraser. In the 72nd minute, Harwood-Bellis sent a long ball over the Leeds defence where Aribo ran onto it and lobbed it over Meslier but he managed to save it. In the 73rd and 74th minutes Farke made his second and third changes of the match with Connor Roberts replacing Kamara and Jaidon Anthony replacing Summerville. In the 79th minute, Adams was the next player to be booked for a foul on Ethan Ampadu. In the 83rd minute, Martin made the Saints third change with Ryan Manning replacing Edozie – who had earlier replaced the injured Brooks – and Farke made the Whites' fourth change with Mateo Joseph replacing Firpo. In the 85th minute, James flicked the ball to Rutter before it was played straight back to James who sent a shot towards goal which hit the crossbar. In the 85th minute, Downes was then booked for halting a Leeds counter-attack. In the 94th minute, Rutter's flick found Anthony on the left-hand side of the penalty area and he passed it to James whose shot was palmed away from danger by Alex McCarthy. In the 101st minute, Aribo was booked for delaying the restart and Ampadu was also booked for his involvement in the incident with Aribo. The Saints managed to hold-on to secure promotion to the Premier League at the first attempt and condemn Leeds to another season in the EFL Championship.

=== Details ===
26 May 2024
15:00 BST

Leeds United	0–1	Southampton
	Report	A. Armstrong 24'

Wembley Stadium, London
Attendance: 85,862
Referee: John Brooks

Leeds United	Southampton

GK	1	(France) Illan Meslier
RB	22	(England) Archie Gray
CB	14	(Wales) Joe Rodon
CB	4	(Wales) Ethan Ampadu (c)	(yellow card) 90+12'
LB	3	(Dominican Republic) Junior Firpo	(substituted off) 83'
CM	44	(Bulgaria) Ilia Gruev
CM	8	(Finland) Glen Kamara	(substituted off) 73'
RW	29	(Italy) Wilfried Gnonto	(substituted off) 66'
AM	24	(France) Georginio Rutter
LW	10	(Netherlands) Crysencio Summerville	(yellow card) 43'	(substituted off) 74'
CF	7	(Netherlands) Joël Piroe
Substitutes:
GK	28	(England) Karl Darlow
DF	6	(Scotland) Liam Cooper
DF	25	(England) Sam Byram
DF	33	(Wales) Connor Roberts	(substituted on) 73'
MF	12	(England) Jaidon Anthony	(substituted on) 74'
MF	17	(England) Jamie Shackleton
MF	20	(Wales) Daniel James	(substituted on) 66'
FW	30	(England) Joe Gelhardt
FW	49	(Spain) Mateo Joseph	(substituted on) 83'
Manager:
(Germany) Daniel Farke

GK	1	(England) Alex McCarthy
RB	2	(England) Kyle Walker-Peters
CB	21	(England) Taylor Harwood-Bellis	(yellow card) 51'
CB	35	(Poland) Jan Bednarek	(yellow card) 39'
LB	5	(England) Jack Stephens (c)
CM	16	(Republic of Ireland) Will Smallbone
CM	4	(England) Flynn Downes	(yellow card) 85'
CM	7	(Nigeria) Joe Aribo	(yellow card) 90+12'
RF	36	(Wales) David Brooks	(substituted off) 35'
CF	9	(England) Adam Armstrong
LF	26	(Scotland) Ryan Fraser	(yellow card) 45'	(substituted off) 70'
Substitutes:
GK	13	(England) Joe Lumley
DF	3	(Republic of Ireland) Ryan Manning	(substituted on) 83'
DF	14	(England) James Bree
MF	19	(England) Joe Rothwell
MF	20	(Ghana) Kamaldeen Sulemana
MF	23	(England) Samuel Edozie	(substituted on) 35'	(substituted off) 83'
MF	24	(Northern Ireland) Shea Charles
FW	10	(Scotland) Ché Adams	(substituted on) 70'	(yellow card) 79'
FW	11	(Scotland) Ross Stewart
Manager:
(Scotland) Russell Martin

Man of the Match:
Adam Armstrong (Southampton)

== Post-match ==
Southampton's win meant they joined champions Leicester City and second placed Ipswich Town in the Premier League. On the win, Southampton manager Russell Martin said "To watch them from the pitch celebrate that together is, yeah, it will live with me forever, as a group of players and young men, they've been incredible." He also thanked the owners of Southampton for giving him the opportunity to manage the team.

Leeds boss Daniel Farke was quoted as saying "Obviously we're suffering a lot in this moment and deeply disappointed because once you come so close after overall a terrific season with 90 points." He also praised his side's performance saying "Today we can't really say that we are the worst side in this final and to lose this final hurts a lot."

The defeat for Leeds continued their run of never being promoted in the playoffs and their sixth playoff final loss set a new record in English football of playoff final defeats.
