= Nick Woltemade =

German footballer (born 2002)

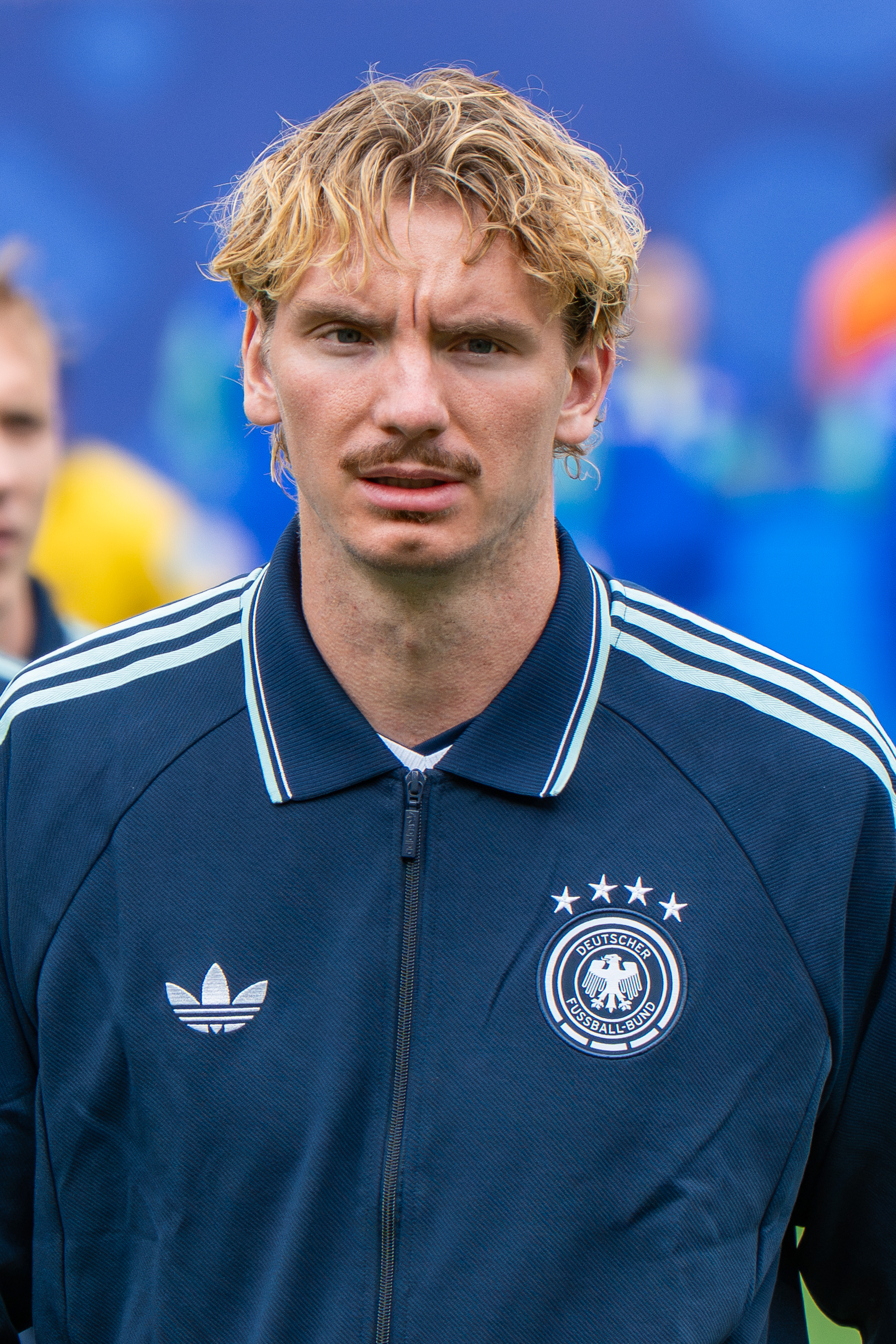
- Woltemade with Germany in 2026

Personal information
- Date of birth: 14 February 2002 (age 24)
- Place of birth: Bremen, Germany
- Height: 1.98 m (6 ft 6 in)
- Positions: Forward; attacking midfielder

Team information
- Current team: Juventus (on loan from Newcastle United)
- Number: 27

Youth career
- 2009–2010: TS Woltmershausen
- 2010–2020: Werder Bremen

Senior career*
Years	Team	Apps	(Gls)
2020–2024	Werder Bremen	48	(2)
2022	Werder Bremen II	3	(0)
2022–2023	→ SV Elversberg (loan)	31	(10)
2024–2025	VfB Stuttgart	29	(12)
2025–	Newcastle United	34	(8)
2026–	→ Juventus (loan)	10	(2)

International career^{‡}
2018	Germany U16	2	(0)
2018–2019	Germany U17	13	(3)
2021–2022	Germany U20	7	(2)
2023–2025	Germany U21	18	(13)
2025–	Germany	14	(4)
Medal record
Representing Germany
UEFA European Under-21 Championship
Runner-up	2025 Slovakia
- * Club domestic league appearances and goals as of 22:45, 22 November 2026 (UTC) ‡ National team caps and goals as of 08:44, 5 October 2026 (UTC)

Nick Woltemade (German pronunciation: [nɪk ˈvɔltəˌmaːdə]; born 14 February 2002) is a German professional footballer who plays as a forward or attacking midfielder for Serie A club Juventus, on loan from Premier League club Newcastle United, and the Germany national team.

== Club career ==
=== Early career at academy of Werder Bremen ===
Woltemade began his career at TS Woltmershausen, a multi-sport club in Bremen, where he initially played handball in addition to football. In 2010, he transferred to Werder Bremen's youth academy, where he consistently attracted attention. In 2013, he won the Spatzenberg Cup in Löhne with Werder's Under-11 team. In his last season for the Under-17 team, of which he was the captain, he achieved 26 direct goal contributions. Woltemade scored two and three goals respectively on three occasions, but despite this, the team only finished fifth in the Northern/North-Eastern division. In the 2019–20 campaign, the striker once again demonstrated his class, scoring regularly for the Under-19s.

=== Werder Bremen ===
As a result of his performances in the academy, Woltemade was gradually introduced to the first team and regularly trained with Werder Bremen's first team under head coach Florian Kohfeldt. At the beginning of 2020, Woltemade was part of the squad that took part in the winter training camp on the training grounds of Mallorca. Without ever having played for the Under-23 team, Woltemade made his debut as a starter for Werder's first team on match day 20 of the 2019–20 Bundesliga season in an away game against FC Augsburg. At that point, he was 17 years and 352 days old. This appearance made him the youngest Werder player ever, surpassing Thomas Schaaf, who had been one day older when he made his debut on 18 April 1979. Four more brief appearances followed, and thanks to a 6–1 win for Bremen against 1. FC Köln on the final matchday, relegation to the 2. Bundesliga was ultimately avoided.

Parallel to his involvement with the first team, the striker continued to play for Werder's second team. In the summer of 2020, he was permanently transferred to the Bundesliga team. However, throughout the season, Kohfeldt frequently relied on Josh Sargent in attack, leading to Woltemade only playing as a substitute, at times even starting on the bench for several games in a row. After the turn of the year, the season ended prematurely for the now 18-year-old, as he first contracted a virus and then suffered a torn ligament. Without him, Werder were relegated to the second division, finishing second from bottom. The 2021–22 second division campaign was also marked by few minutes of playing time for the young player and several months out of action following foot surgery. Bremen were promoted back to the Bundesliga as runners-up, thanks in part to the highly successful strike duo of Niclas Füllkrug and Marvin Ducksch.

==== Loan to SV Elversberg ====
In August 2022, Woltemade joined newly-promoted 3. Liga club SV Elversberg on a one-year loan. He scored ten goals in the league, helping his club achieve back-to-back promotions to the 2. Bundesliga, and earning the 3. Liga Player of the Season award.

=== VfB Stuttgart ===
Ahead of the 2024–25 season, Woltemade moved to VfB Stuttgart and signed a four-year contract with the club. He ended his first season with 17 goals scored in all competitions, including a goal in the DFB-Pokal final, which his side won.

=== Newcastle United ===
After his breakout season with Stuttgart, Woltemade became one of the primary transfer targets for the German champions Bayern Munich, who wanted a back-up for Harry Kane. Their bids, the last of which was worth around €60 million, were rejected by Stuttgart, who set the minimum price at €75 million. On 30 August 2025, in the last days of the transfer window, Woltemade signed a six-year contract with the Premier League club Newcastle United in a club-record deal reported to consist of an initial fee of €75 million plus €5 million in potential add-ons.

With the departure of Callum Wilson, and uncertainty over Alexander Isak's future at the club, the striker position was one of Newcastle’s priorities during the transfer window. Their primary targets which the club have failed to sign, such as João Pedro, Hugo Ekitike and Benjamin Šeško, were stylistically different from Woltemade, but the team's head coach Eddie Howe said that the striker "fits the profile for exactly what we have been looking to add to our attacking options". Isak eventually left Newcastle on 1 September, the closing day of the transfer window, and Yoane Wissa was signed as his direct replacement. With Wissa sustaining a serious injury before he could make his debut for Newcastle, Woltemade became the team's primary striker.

Woltemade began with a hot streak for Newcastle, netting five goals in his first six starts. On 13 September, he made his debut for the team, scoring in a 1–0 Premier League win against Wolverhampton Wanderers. On 1 October, he netted his first UEFA Champions League goal in a 4–0 away win over Union Saint-Gilloise. This made him the first Newcastle player to score on both his Premier League and Champions League starts. On 5 October, Woltemade scored a penalty in a 2–0 win over Nottingham Forest, becoming the third player to score in his first three matches at St James' Park, behind Les Ferdinand and Alan Shearer. On 14 December, Woltemade scored an own goal in a 1–0 loss to Sunderland, which was the first Wear–Tyne derby in the Premier League since 2016. He bounced back the following weekend by scoring both goals in a 2–2 draw against Chelsea.

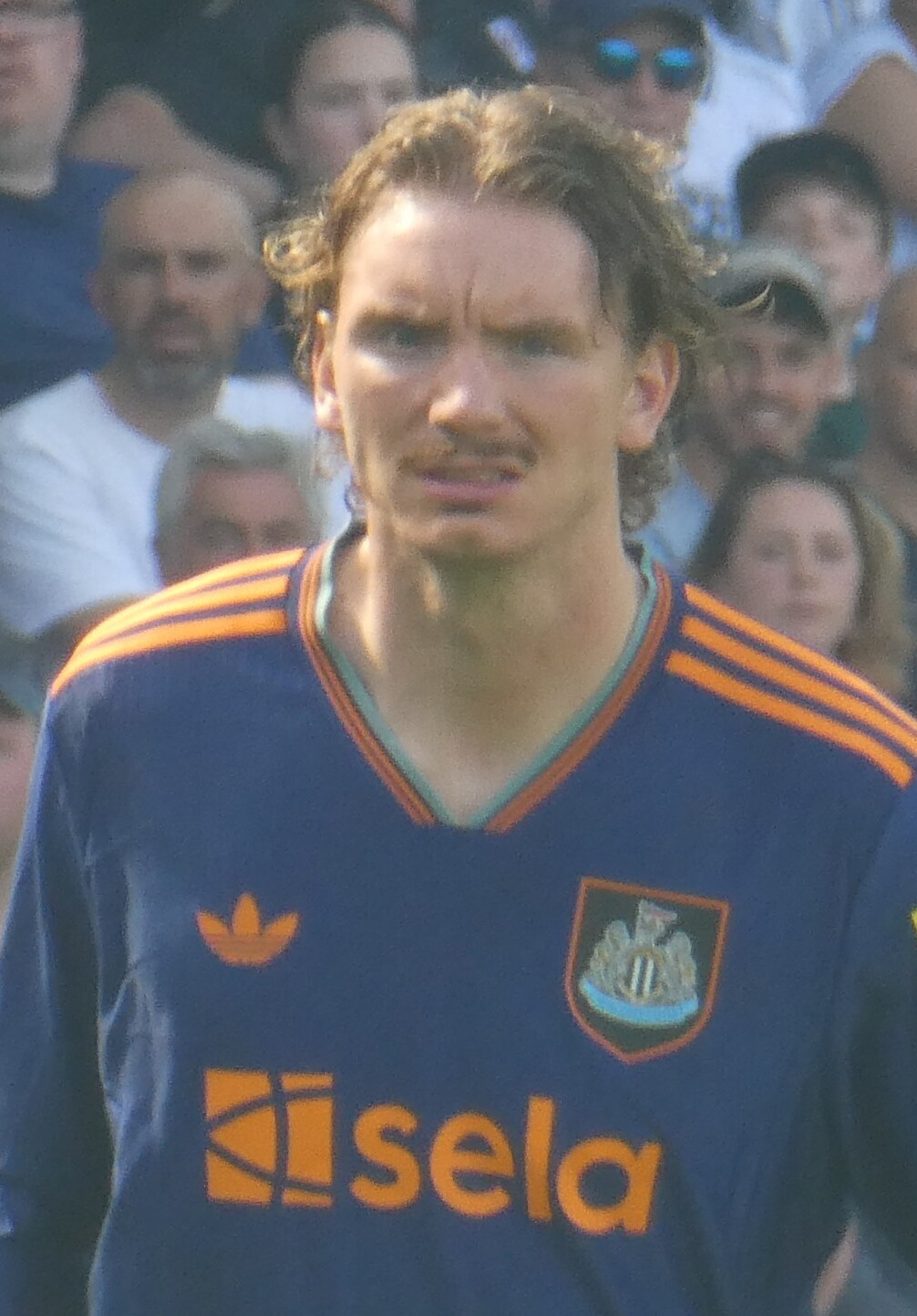
Woltemade with Newcastle United in 2026

Woltemade's s form dipped in the second half of the season, with only two goals scored across all competitions. In February 2026, following Bruno Guimarães's hamstring injury, Howe started to use Woltemade in deeper positions, with Anthony Gordon or William Osula playing up front.

==== Loan to Juventus ====
In summer 2026, Howe was replaced by Matthias Jaissle, a head coach with even more physically demanding style of play. On 1 September, with the deadline-day arrival of Matias Fernandez-Pardo, Newcastle loaned Woltemade to the Serie A club Juventus for a £3.5 million fee. He scored in his first-ever start for the club on 17 September 2026, in the club opening match of UEFA Europa League against NEC Nijmegen. He scored in the 35th-minute from the penalty spot, after a foul won by teammate Nico González.

== International career ==
Woltemade was a youth international footballer for Germany who competed in the 2019 UEFA European Under-17 Championship.

Woltemade was included in the Germany squad at the 2025 UEFA European Under-21 Championship, scoring a hat-trick in Germany's 3–0 group victory against Slovenia. He scored his fourth goal of the tournament in a 4–2 victory against the Czech Republic, as Germany confirmed their progression to the knockout stage of the competition and ended the tournament as finalist and top scorer with six goals.

On 22 May 2025, Woltemade received his first call-up to the Germany national team for the Nations League Finals. On 4 June, he debuted in the semi-final against Portugal. On 13 October, he scored his first goal for his country in a 1–0 win over Northern Ireland, in a 2026 World Cup qualifier. On 14 November, he scored his first brace in a 2–0 win over Luxembourg. On 21 May 2026, he was selected in Germany's 26-man squad for the 2026 FIFA World Cup. In the Round of 32 against Paraguay, he came off the bench, replacing Leroy Sané in a 1–1 draw before having his attempt saved by Orlando Gill in a penalty shootout defeat.

== Personal life ==
Woltemade's sister Madita (born 1998) is a handball player for TuS Komet Arsten in the Handball-Regionalliga Niedersachsen, after a period at TV Oyten Vampires, and is also employed as a teacher.

== Career statistics ==
=== Club ===
As of match played 22 November 2026

Appearances and goals by club, season and competition
Club	Season	League			National cup (Note: Includes DFB-Pokal, FA Cup, Coppa Italia)		League cup (Note: Includes EFL Cup)		Europe		Other		Total	
Club	Season	Division	Apps	Goals	Apps	Goals	Apps	Goals	Apps	Goals	Apps	Goals	Apps	Goals
Werder Bremen	2019–20	Bundesliga	5	0	1	0	—		—		—		6	0
Werder Bremen	2020–21	Bundesliga	6	0	2	0	—		—		—		8	0
Werder Bremen	2021–22	2. Bundesliga	7	0	0	0	—		—		—		7	0
Werder Bremen	2023–24	Bundesliga	30	2	0	0	—		—		—		30	2
Werder Bremen	Total		48	2	3	0	—		—		—		51	2
Werder Bremen II	2021–22	Regionalliga Nord	1	0	—		—		—		—		1	0
Werder Bremen II	2022–23	Regionalliga Nord	2	0	—		—		—		—		2	0
Werder Bremen II	Total		3	0	—		—		—		—		3	0
SV Elversberg (loan)	2022–23	3. Liga	31	10	1	0	—		—		—		32	10
VfB Stuttgart	2024–25	Bundesliga	28	12	5	5	—		0	0	0	0	33	17
VfB Stuttgart	2025–26	Bundesliga	1	0	1	1	—		—		1 (Note: Appearance in Franz Beckenbauer Supercup)	0	3	1
VfB Stuttgart	Total		29	12	6	6	—		0	0	1	0	36	18
Newcastle United	2025–26	Premier League	33	8	3	1	5	1	10 (Note: Appearances in UEFA Champions League)	1	—		51	11
Newcastle United	2026–27	Premier League	1	0	—		1	0	—		—		2	0
Newcastle United	Total		34	8	3	1	6	1	10	1	—		53	11
Juventus (loan)	2026–27	Serie A	10	2	0	0	—		4 (Note: Appearances in UEFA Europa League)	3	—		14	5
Career total			155	34	13	7	6	1	14	4	1	0	189	46

=== International ===
As of match played 4 October 2026

Appearances and goals by national team and year
National team	Year	Apps	Goals
Germany	2025	8	4
Germany	2026	6	0
Total		14	4

As of match played 17 November 2025
Germany score listed first, score column indicates score after each Woltemade goal.

List of international goals scored by Nick Woltemade
No.	Date	Venue	Opponent	Score	Result	Competition
1	13 October 2025	Windsor Park, Belfast, Northern Ireland	Northern Ireland	1–0	1–0	2026 FIFA World Cup qualification
2	14 November 2025	Stade de Luxembourg, Luxembourg City, Luxembourg	Luxembourg	1–0	2–0	2026 FIFA World Cup qualification
3	14 November 2025	Stade de Luxembourg, Luxembourg City, Luxembourg	Luxembourg	2–0	2–0	2026 FIFA World Cup qualification
4	17 November 2025	Red Bull Arena, Leipzig, Germany	Slovakia	1–0	6–0	2026 FIFA World Cup qualification

== Honours ==
SV Elversberg

- 3. Liga: 2022–23
- Saarland Cup: 2022–23

VfB Stuttgart

- DFB-Pokal: 2024–25

Germany U21

- UEFA European Under-21 Championship runner-up: 2025

Individual

- 3. Liga Player of the Season: 2022–23
- DFB-Pokal top scorer: 2024–25
- VDV Newcomer of the Season (Silver Arrow): 2024–25
- Kicker Bundesliga Team of the Season: 2024–25
- UEFA European Under-21 Championship top scorer: 2025
- UEFA European Under-21 Championship Team of the Tournament: 2025
