= Luis Engelns =

German footballer

Personal information
- Full name: Luis Engelns
- Date of birth: March 11, 2007 (age 19)
- Place of birth: Paderborn, Germany
- Height: 1.90 m (6 ft 3 in)
- Position: Midfielder

Team information
- Current team: TSG Hoffenheim
- Number: 16

Youth career
- 2010–2016: Hövelhofer SV
- 2016–2024: SC Paderborn

Senior career*
Years	Team	Apps	(Gls)
2024	SC Paderborn II	9	(4)
2024–2026	SC Paderborn	29	(1)
2026–	TSG Hoffenheim II	15	(1)

International career
2024	Germany U18	2	(0)
2025–	Germany U19	13	(0)
- * Club domestic league appearances and goals as of 19 July 2026

Luis Engelns (born 11 March 2007) is a German professional footballer who plays as a midfielder for Bundesliga club TSG Hoffenheim.

== Club career ==
Engelns began playing football with Hövelhofer SV at the age of 3, before joining SC Paderborn's academy in 2016. He played through Padernborn's youth categories, before being promoted to their senior team in the summer of 2024. He made his professional debut as a substitute in a 3–0 2. Bundesliga loss to 1. FC Kaiserslautern on 19 October 2024.

On 2 February 2026, Engelns joined TSG Hoffenheim, where he was first assigned to their reserves.

== International career ==
Engelns was called up to the Germany U19s for the 2026 UEFA European Under-19 Championship.

He was one of the players who were called up with the Germany U20 national team by head coach Hannes Wolf for the Under 20 Elite League matches against Poland and Czech Republic, 13 and 16 November 2026 respectively.

== Personal life ==
Engelns is the son of Daniel Farke, a former footballer and current Leeds United manager.
