= Daniel Farke =

German footballer and manager (born 1976)

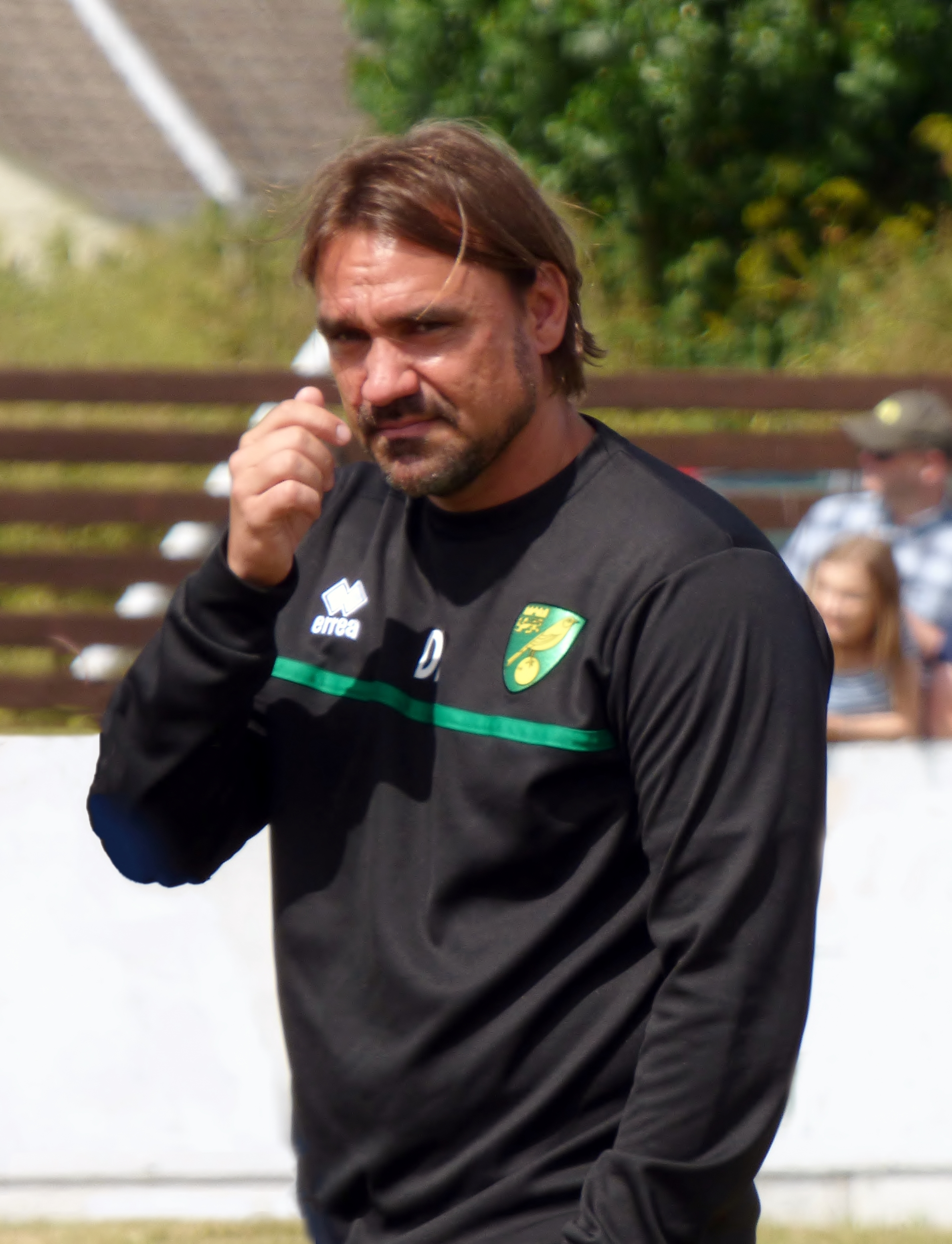
- Farke in 2017

Personal information
- Full name: Daniel Farke
- Date of birth: 30 October 1976 (age 50)
- Place of birth: Steinhausen, West Germany
- Position: Forward

Team information
- Current team: Leeds United (manager)

Senior career*
Years	Team	Apps	(Gls)
- SV Steinhausen
1994–1997	TuS Paderborn-Neuhaus	19	(10)
2001–2003	SV Lippstadt	39	(28)
2003–2005	SV Wilhelmshaven		
2005	Bonner SC	10	(10)
2006	SV Lippstadt	12	(11)
2006–2007	SV Meppen	23	(9)
2007–2008	SV Lippstadt	6	(8)
Total		109	(76)

Managerial career
- 2009–2015: SV Lippstadt
- 2015–2017: Borussia Dortmund II
- 2017–2021: Norwich City
- 2022: Krasnodar
- 2022–2023: Borussia Mönchengladbach
- 2023–: Leeds United
- * Club domestic league appearances and goals

Daniel Farke (German pronunciation: [ˈdaːni̯eːl ˈfaʁkə, -ni̯ɛl -]; born 30 October 1976) is a German professional football manager and former player who is the manager of Premier League club Leeds United.

Farke spent most of his playing career with SV Lippstadt, where he also began his management career. After a spell at Borussia Dortmund II, he led Norwich City for four years, twice winning the EFL Championship. In January 2022 he was appointed as head coach of Russian Premier League club Krasnodar, but resigned two months later without managing a game due to the Russian invasion of Ukraine. He then managed Borussia Mönchengladbach in the Bundesliga for a season before being appointed manager of Leeds United in the EFL Championship and Premier League.

== Playing career ==
Farke started his career with hometown club SV Steinhausen. He spent the majority of his playing career with SV Lippstadt, with whom he had three spells. Farke said that he "knew how to score" but was probably "the slowest striker in the whole of Western Europe". He played his whole career in the lower levels of German football.

== Managerial career ==
=== Early managerial career ===
Farke began his managerial career with SV Lippstadt. He was in charge for six years and took Lippstadt from the sixth tier of German football to the fourth, with his time in charge considered by some to be the most successful for Lippstadt football. He stepped down after six years, planning to take a year's sabbatical, before accepting the opportunity to take charge of Borussia Dortmund II, the reserve team of German club Borussia Dortmund. He managed the team for two seasons before he was recruited by Norwich City, having failed to agree a new contract at Dortmund. He finished with a record of 29 wins, 21 draws and six losses.

=== Norwich City ===
On 25 May 2017, Farke was appointed as the head coach of Championship club Norwich City on a two-year contract. Farke's first league game for Norwich City ended in a 1–1 draw after a late equaliser from Nélson Oliveira at Craven Cottage and his first competitive game at Carrow Road saw Norwich beat Swindon Town 3–2 in the EFL Cup. Farke completed his inaugural season in the Championship winning 15 games, drawing 15 and losing 16 – finishing 14th in the league table.

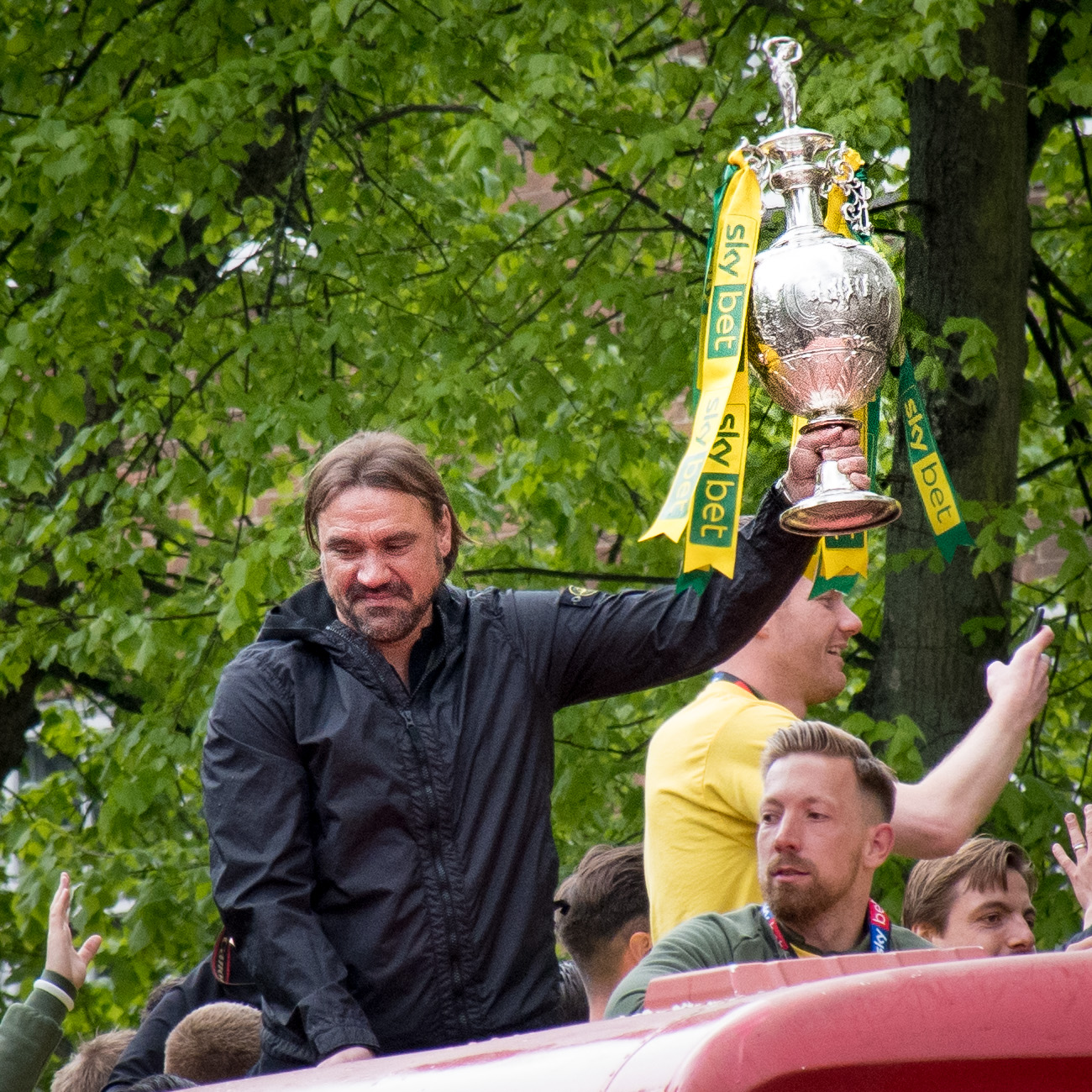
Farke during the trophy parade after winning the Championship as Norwich manager in 2019

The following season saw Norwich promoted as Championship title winners. Farke won the Manager of the Month award for November and in March 2019 signed a three-year contract extension, tying him to the club until June 2022. The team secured promotion to the Premier League on their penultimate match of the 2018–19 season, before securing the league title after the last match of the season.

Norwich were relegated from the Premier League following a 4–0 home loss to West Ham United on 12 July 2020. In 2020–21, Norwich won the Championship and secured an immediate return to the Premier League with a club record 97 points. Farke was subsequently named EFL Championship Manager of the Season. On 21 July 2021, Farke signed a new four-year contract with the club.

In September 2021, Farke lost his 15th consecutive Premier League game in charge of Norwich (including the 2019–20 season), a record for a club or a manager in English top-flight history. On 6 November, Norwich recorded their first league win of the season with a 2–1 away victory over Brentford. However, on the same day Farke was dismissed after the game and later replaced by former Aston Villa head coach Dean Smith on 15 November 2021. He finished with a record of 87 wins, 49 draws and 72 losses.

=== Krasnodar ===
On 13 January 2022, Krasnodar announced that Farke had been appointed as the club's new head coach on a contract until 30 June 2024. He left the club on 2 March, along with the rest of his coaching staff, due to the Russian invasion of Ukraine. Due to the winter break and Krasnodar International Airport's military use, he did not take charge of any matches for the club.

=== Borussia Mönchengladbach ===
On 4 June 2022, Farke was appointed head coach of Borussia Mönchengladbach on a three-year deal. His first match was a 9–1 win at amateurs SV Oberachern in the DFB-Pokal first round; six days later he won 3–1 at home to 1899 Hoffenheim in the first Bundesliga match of his entire career. Farke was sacked on 2 June 2023 after one season with the team, having finished 10th. He finished with a record of 12 wins, 10 draws and 14 losses.

=== Leeds United ===
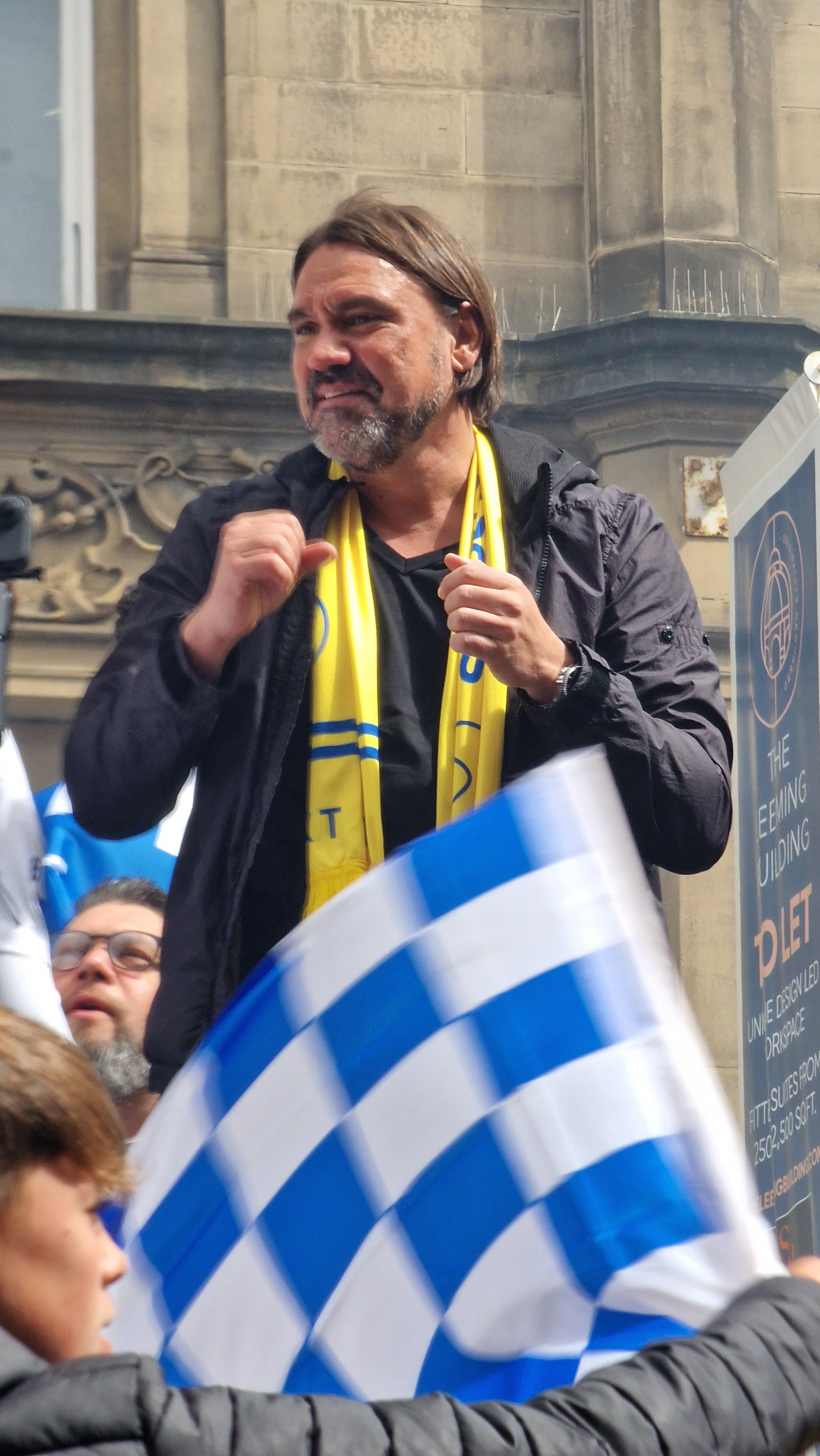
Farke at Leeds' Championship title parade in 2025

On 4 July 2023, Farke was appointed as the manager of newly relegated Championship club Leeds United on a four-year contract. His debut on 6 August was a 2–2 draw at home to Cardiff City, having trailed 2–0. Having accumulated 90 points in his first season as manager, Leeds missed out on automatic promotion to the Premier League, before going on to lose the play-off final to Southampton. Farke led Leeds to promotion to the Premier League in the following season, winning the Championship title on goal difference with 100 points on the final day of the season in a 2–1 win away at Plymouth Argyle.

Farke and Leeds were very active in the 2025-2026 season summer transfer window. Notable signings included Sean Longstaff from Newcastle United for a £12.5 million fee, Anton Stach from TSG Hoffenheim for £17 million, Noah Okafor from AC Milan for £18 million, and Dominic Calvert-Lewin as a free agent following the expiration of his contract at Everton.

After a considerably successful run of pre-season games, playing Manchester United, AC Milan and Villarreal, as well as two games against German clubs SC Verl and SC Paderborn behind closed doors, Leeds won their first game back in the Premier League with a 1–0 victory at Elland Road against Everton. However, after a rough run of games by November 2025, including being knocked out of the second round of the EFL Cup by Sheffield Wednesday, there were reports that Farke would be dismissed from his role. Despite these tabloid rumours, Farke managed to successfully bring a turnaround to Leeds, beating rivals Chelsea 3–1 at Elland Road, marking a turning point in form that lasted throughout the remainder of the season.

Later that season Farke was controversially sent off in the climax of a 1–0 defeat to Manchester City on 28th February 2026 for jogging onto the pitch to talk to the referee. This meant that Farke had to watch Leeds FA Cup tie against his former club Norwich City from the stands as assistant manager Edmund Riemer led the Whites to a 3–0 win. The press conference prior to the Norwich game went viral on sites such as TikTok and Instagram due to his response to the jogging incident, which prompted a wave of support for the German.

In the League Farke led Leeds to their first win at Old Trafford in the league in 45 years, beating the Red Devils 2–1 on 13 April 2026. Farke also led Leeds to their most successful FA Cup run since 1987, where they played Chelsea at Wembley Stadium in the semi-finals. Leeds would go on to lose 1–0 as a result of a first half header from Enzo Fernandez. Despite this setback Farke would continue to do well, leading Leeds to an 8 game unbeaten streak, the longest since their 2001-2002 season.

Leeds finished a comfortable 14th in the Premier League at the end of the season, 8 points above the relegation zone and 6 points away from a Europa Conference League spot.

Leeds were very active again in the following transfer window ahead of the 2026–27 season. Farke signed previous transfer target Harry Wilson from Fulham on a free transfer, Sassuolo centre-back Tarik Muharemović for £37 million following an impressive World Cup with Bosnia and Herzegovina, Borussia Mönchengladbach and Swiss international centre-back Nico Elvedi for £8.5 million, as well Manchester City and England goalkeeper James Trafford for a club record fee of £40 million. This fee also broke the record for most expensive British goalkeeper as of 2026.

Farke has continued the previous seasons strong form, taking Leeds unbeaten in their first 5 games. Leeds turn in form has been credited to Farke's tactical and formation changes. Most notable has been his switch from a traditional possession-based 4-3-3 system that Leeds utilised in the Championship to a more direct 3-5-2 counter-attacking style. Farke also began to make heavy use of set-piece plays, with strong contributions from Anton Stach's freekicks and Captain Ethan Ampadu's long throws leading Leeds to generate the 5th highest xG from set pieces in 2025-26, and joint 2nd highest so far in 2026-2027.

== Personal life ==
Farke's son, Luis Engelns, is also a professional footballer and German youth international.

== Managerial statistics ==
As of match played 21 November 2026

Managerial record by team and tenure
Team	From	To	Record					Ref.
Team	From	To	P	W	D	L	Win %	Ref.
Borussia Dortmund II	3 November 2015	25 May 2017	56	29	21	6	51.8	
Norwich City	25 May 2017	6 November 2021	208	87	49	72	41.8	
Borussia Mönchengladbach	4 June 2022	2 June 2023	36	12	10	14	33.3	
Leeds United	4 July 2023	Present	161	79	47	35	49.1	
Total			461	207	127	127	44.9	

== Honours ==
SV Lippstadt

- Oberliga Westfalen: 2012–13
- Westfalenliga Group 1: 2011–12

Norwich City

- EFL Championship: 2018–19, 2020–21

Leeds United

- EFL Championship: 2024–25

Individual

- EFL Championship Manager of the Month: November 2018, November 2023, January 2024, February 2024, December 2024, February 2025
- EFL Championship Manager of the Season: 2020–21
- LMA Championship Manager of the Year: 2021
