= Jean-Manuel Mbom =

German footballer (born 2000)

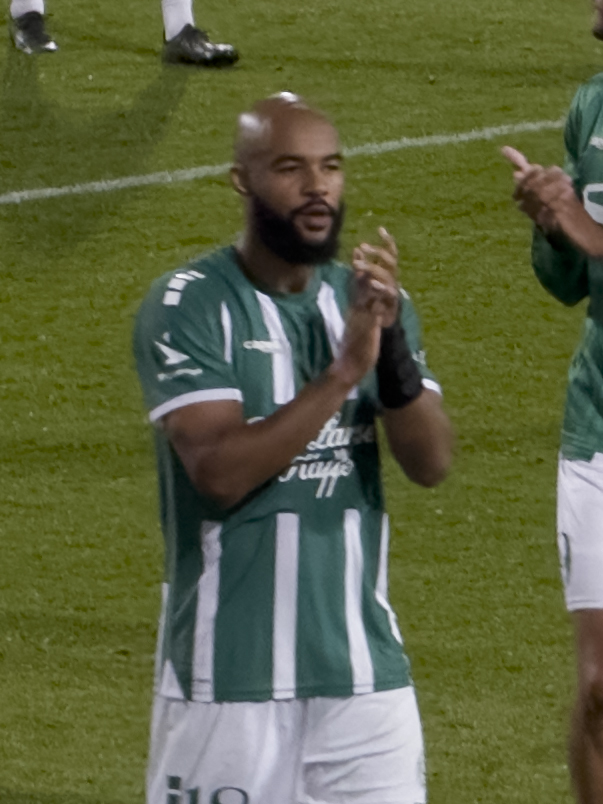
- Mbom in 2025

Personal information
- Date of birth: 24 February 2000 (age 26)
- Place of birth: Bovenden, Germany
- Height: 1.83 m (6 ft 0 in)
- Position: Midfielder

Team information
- Current team: VfL Bochum
- Number: 8

Youth career
- –2012: Bovender SV
- 2012–2013: JFV Göttingen
- 2013–2018: Werder Bremen

Senior career*
Years	Team	Apps	(Gls)
2018–2023	Werder Bremen II	25	(1)
2018–2023	Werder Bremen	42	(0)
2019–2020	→ KFC Uerdingen (loan)	28	(1)
2023–2026	Viborg	76	(1)
2026–	VfL Bochum	2	(0)

International career^{‡}
2015–2016	Germany U16	5	(1)
2016–2017	Germany U17	7	(2)
2018	Germany U18	2	(0)
2018–2019	Germany U19	8	(0)
2019	Germany U20	4	(0)
2020–2021	Germany U21	5	(0)
- * Club domestic league appearances and goals as of 20:04, 14 August 2026 (UTC) ‡ National team caps and goals as of 16:27, 13 November 2021 (UTC)

Jean-Manuel Mbom (born 24 February 2000) is a German professional footballer who plays as a midfielder for 2. Bundesliga club VfL Bochum. He has represented Germany internationally at various youth levels.

== Career ==
Mbom made his professional debut for KFC Uerdingen in the 3. Liga on 21 July 2019, starting in the home match against Hallescher FC before being substituted out in the 55th minute for Dennis Daube, with the match finishing as a 1–0 win.

Mbom made his Bundesliga debut on the 2020–21 season's second matchday on 26 September 2020, in a 3–1 win away to Schalke 04. He started the match and played on the right side of midfield.

On 24 August 2023, Mbom signed a three-year contract with Danish Superliga club Viborg. After 90 appearances and one goal, Viborg announced on 22 May 2026 that Mbom would leave the club at the expiry of his contract the following month.

2. Bundesliga club VfL Bochum announced on 3 June 2026 that they had signed Mbom to a three-year contract.

== Personal life ==
Mbom was born in Bovenden, Lower Saxony and is of Cameroonian descent. In 2021, he featured in Schwarze Adler, a documentary detailing the experiences of Black players in German professional football.

== Career statistics ==
As of match played 23 August 2026

Appearances and goals by club, season and competition
Club	Season	League			National cup (Note: Appearances in the DFB-Pokal, Danish Cup)		Other		Total	
Club	Season	Division	Apps	Goals	Apps	Goals	Apps	Goals	Apps	Goals
Werder Bremen II	2018–19	Regionalliga Nord	23	1	—		—		23	1
Werder Bremen II	2022–23	Regionalliga Nord	2	0	—		—		2	0
Werder Bremen II	Total		25	1	0	0	0	0	25	1
KFC Uerdingen (loan)	2019–20	3. Liga	28	1	1	0	–		29	1
Werder Bremen	2020–21	Bundesliga	21	0	3	1	—		24	1
Werder Bremen	2021–22	2. Bundesliga	19	0	1	0	—		20	0
Werder Bremen	2022–23	Bundesliga	2	0	0	0	—		2	0
Werder Bremen	Total		42	0	4	1	0	0	46	1
Viborg FF	2023–24	Danish Superliga	24	0	2	0	—		26	0
Viborg FF	2024–25	Danish Superliga	29	1	6	0	—		35	1
Viborg FF	2025–26	Danish Superliga	23	0	6	0	—		29	0
Viborg FF	Total		76	1	14	0	0	0	90	1
VfL Bochum	2026–27	2. Bundesliga	2	0	1	0	—		3	0
Career total			173	3	20	1	0	0	193	4

== Honours ==
Individual

- Fritz Walter Medal U17 Silver: 2017
