= Oscar Schönfelder =

German footballer

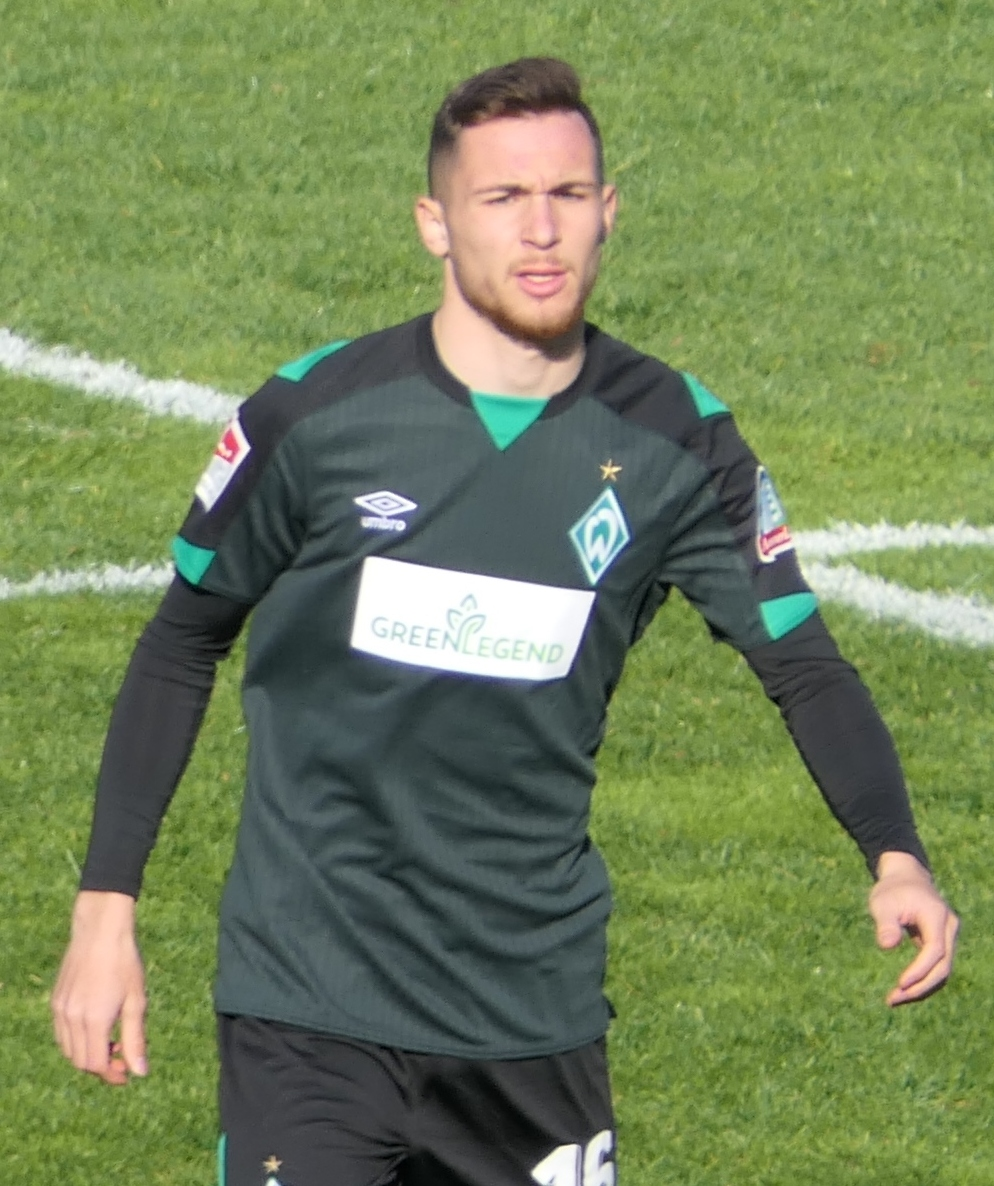
- Schönfelder with Werder Bremen in 2021

Personal information
- Date of birth: 5 February 2001 (age 25)
- Place of birth: Berlin, Germany
- Height: 1.81 m (5 ft 11 in)
- Position: Winger

Team information
- Current team: Jahn Regensburg
- Number: 7

Youth career
- 2013–2020: Mainz 05

Senior career*
Years	Team	Apps	(Gls)
2020–2023	Werder Bremen II	11	(4)
2021–2023	Werder Bremen	10	(0)
2022–2023	→ Jahn Regensburg (loan)	0	(0)
2023–	Jahn Regensburg	64	(2)

International career^{‡}
2016–2017	Germany U16	6	(0)
2017	Germany U17	3	(0)
2018–2019	Germany U18	6	(1)
2019	Germany U19	8	(1)
- * Club domestic league appearances and goals as of 14:28, 26 September 2026 (UTC) ‡ National team caps and goals as of 21:52, 20 August 2023 (UTC)

Oscar Schönfelder (born 5 February 2001) is a German professional footballer who plays as a winger for 3. Liga club Jahn Regensburg.

== Club career ==
A youth product for Mainz 05 since 2013, Schönfelder transferred to Werder Bremen on 30 June 2020. He made his professional debut with Werder Bremen in a 2–0 DFB-Pokal win over Osnabrück on 7 August 2021.

In June 2022, it was announced Schönfelder would join Jahn Regensburg on loan for the 2022–23 season. At the end of his loan spell, he agreed to join the club permanently on a two-year contract. In June 2025, he agreed a new one-year contract with the club, and again agreed a one-year contract in June 2026.

== International career ==
Schönfelder is a youth international for Germany, having represented the Germany U16s, U17s, Germany U18s and U19s.

== Career statistics ==
As of 26 September 2026

Appearances and goals by club, season and competition
Club	Season	League			Cup		Other		Total	
Club	Season	Division	Apps	Goals	Apps	Goals	Apps	Goals	Apps	Goals
Werder Bremen II	2020–21	Regionalliga Nord	6	0	–		0	0	6	0
Werder Bremen II	2021–22	Regionalliga Nord	5	4	–		0	0	5	4
Werder Bremen II	Total		11	4	0	0	0	0	11	4
Werder Bremen	2021–22	2. Bundesliga	10	0	1	0	0	0	11	0
Jahn Regensburg	2022–23	2. Bundesliga	0	0	0	0	0	0	0	0
Jahn Regensburg	2023–24	3. Liga	32	1	0	0	0	0	32	1
Jahn Regensburg	2024–25	2. Bundesliga	5	0	1	0	0	0	6	0
Jahn Regensburg	2025–26	3. Liga	20	1	0	0	0	0	20	1
Jahn Regensburg	2026–27	3. Liga	7	0	–		0	0	7	0
Jahn Regensburg	Total		64	2	1	0	0	0	65	2
Career total			85	6	2	0	0	0	87	6
