= Patrick Erras =

German footballer (born 1995)

Personal information
- Date of birth: 21 January 1995 (age 31)
- Place of birth: Amberg, Germany
- Height: 1.96 m (6 ft 5 in)
- Positions: Defensive midfielder; centre-back

Youth career
- 2000–2007: SV Raigering
- 2007–2014: 1. FC Nürnberg

Senior career*
Years	Team	Apps	(Gls)
2014–2017	1. FC Nürnberg II	44	(3)
2015–2020	1. FC Nürnberg	80	(9)
2020–2021	Werder Bremen	4	(0)
2021–2026	Holstein Kiel	80	(3)
- * Club domestic league appearances and goals

Patrick Erras (born 21 January 1995) is a German former professional footballer who played as a defensive midfielder or centre-back.

== Career ==
=== 1. FC Nürnberg ===
Erras began his career at age five at local club SV Raigering, before moving to the 1. FC Nürnberg youth academy in 2007. As part of the under-17 side, he won the Under 17 Bundesliga championship for the South/Southwest Region in the 2011–12 season. Two years later, as part of the under-19 team, he reached promotion to the Under 19 Bundesliga. For the 2014–15 season, Erras was promoted to the reserve team who competed in the Regionalliga Bayern, the fourth tier of the German football league system and the highest regional league. He scored his first goal for the reserve team on 15 August 2014 in a 1–3 home loss to 1. FC Schweinfurt 05.

Erras was included in the first-team squad for the first time for a 2. Bundesliga matchup against Greuther Fürth on 13 September 2015, however without making an appearance. On 17 October, he made his 2. Bundesliga debut against FSV Frankfurt playing the full game. On 7 November, in an away match against 1. FC Union Berlin, Erras scored his first goal which tied the game 3–3. A month later, in December 2015, he signed a contract extension with 1. FC Nürnberg. On 17 March 2016, Erras tore the ACL in his right knee in practice, sidelining him for at least a year. He made his comeback the following season, helping Nürnberg reach second place in the league table and reaching promotion to the Bundesliga.

=== Werder Bremen ===
In July 2020, Erras joined Bundesliga club Werder Bremen on a free transfer. He signed a three-year contract. In the 2020–21 season he made seven appearances totalling 87 minutes.

=== Holstein Kiel ===
Erras moved to Holstein Kiel in July 2021, having agreed a three-year contract.

== Career statistics ==
As of 29 November 2024

Appearances and goals by club, season and competition
Club	Season	League			Cup		Other		Total	
Club	Season	Division	Apps	Goals	Apps	Goals	Apps	Goals	Apps	Goals
1. FC Nürnberg II	2013–14	Regionalliga Bayern	1	0	–		–		1	0
1. FC Nürnberg II	2014–15	Regionalliga Bayern	30	2	–		–		30	2
1. FC Nürnberg II	2015–16	Regionalliga Bayern	12	1	–		–		12	1
1. FC Nürnberg II	2016–17	Regionalliga Bayern	1	0	–		–		1	0
1. FC Nürnberg II	Total		44	3	0	0	0	0	44	3
1. FC Nürnberg	2015–16	2. Bundesliga	16	5	1	0	0	0	16	5
1. FC Nürnberg	2016–17	2. Bundesliga	2	0	0	0	0	0	2	0
1. FC Nürnberg	2017–18	2. Bundesliga	23	1	2	0	0	0	25	1
1. FC Nürnberg	2018–19	Bundesliga	19	0	0	0	0	0	19	0
1. FC Nürnberg	2019–20	2. Bundesliga	20	3	1	0	2 (Note: Appearances in 2. Bundesliga relegation playoffs)	0	23	3
1. FC Nürnberg	Total		80	9	4	0	2	0	86	9
Werder Bremen	2020–21	Bundesliga	4	0	3	0	0	0	7	0
Holstein Kiel	2021–22	2. Bundesliga	19	0	2	0	0	0	21	0
Holstein Kiel	2022–23	2. Bundesliga	27	1	1	0	0	0	28	1
Holstein Kiel	2023–24	2. Bundesliga	24	1	1	0	0	0	25	1
Holstein Kiel	2024–25	Bundesliga	10	1	2	0	0	0	12	1
Holstein Kiel	Total		80	3	6	0	0	0	86	3
Career total			208	15	13	0	2	0	223	15
