= 2026–27 SV Werder Bremen season =

SV Werder Bremen
2026–27 season
- President: Hubertus Hess-Grunewald
- Head coach: Daniel Thioune
- Stadium: Weserstadion
- Bundesliga: 5th Place
- DFB-Pokal: 2nd round
- Top goalscorer: League: Niclas Füllkrug (9); All: Niclas Füllkrug (12)
- Highest home attendance: 40,517 (17 October 2026 vs Paderborn)
- Lowest home attendance: 39,713 (5 September 2026 vs RB Leipzig)
- Average home league attendance: 39,946
- Biggest win: 3–1 (5 September 2026 vs RB Leipzig); 2–0 (31 October 2026 vs TSG Hoffenheim)
- Biggest defeat: 1–4 (30 August 2026 vs Freiburg)
- All statistics correct as of 31 October 2026.

The 2026–27 season is SV Werder Bremen's 128th season in existence, and the club's fifth consecutive season in the Bundesliga. The club is participating in the DFB-Pokal.

== Players ==
As of 1 October 2026

Note: Flags indicate national team as defined under FIFA eligibility rules; some limited exceptions apply. Players may hold more than one non-FIFA nationality.

No.	Pos.	Nation	Player
1	GK	EST	Karl Hein
2	DF	BEL	Olivier Deman
3	DF	POL	Oskar Wójcik
4	DF	GER	Niklas Stark
5	DF	GER	Amos Pieper
6	MF	DEN	Jens Stage
8	DF	GER	Mitchell Weiser
9	FW	GER	Keke Topp
10	FW	GER	Niclas Füllkrug (on loan from West Ham United)
11	FW	GER	Justin Njinmah
13	DF	BRA	Arthur (on loan from Bayer Leverkusen)
14	MF	BEL	Senne Lynen
15	MF	NED	Ludovit Reis
16	DF	SEN	Moussa N'Diaye (on loan from Anderlecht)
17	FW	AUT	Marco Grüll
18	MF	TUR	Eren Dinkçi (on loan from Freiburg)
19	FW	HAI	Kenny Quetant

No.	Pos.	Nation	Player
20	MF	ESP	Chuki
23	MF	POL	Dariusz Stalmach
25	GK	GER	Markus Kolke
26	FW	SUI	Cedric Itten
27	DF	NGR	Felix Agu
28	MF	FRA	Skelly Alvero
29	FW	GER	Salim Musah
30	GK	AUT	Alexander Schlager
32	DF	AUT	Marco Friedl (captain)
33	DF	GER	Mick Schmetgens
34	MF	TUR	Darwin Soylu
35	DF	GER	Luca Höcker
36	DF	GER	Mats Heitmann
37	GK	BUL	Stefan Smarkalev
38	FW	GER	Paul Erevbenagie
44	MF	NED	Youri Regeer (on loan from Ajax)

=== Out on loan ===
Note: Flags indicate national team as defined under FIFA eligibility rules; some limited exceptions apply. Players may hold more than one non-FIFA nationality.

No.	Pos.	Nation	Player
—	MF	GER	Wesley Adeh (at Preußen Münster until 30 June 2027)
—	MF	CRO	Patrice Čović (at Dynamo Dresden until 30 June 2027)
22	DF	ARG	Julián Malatini (at FC Cincinnati until 30 June 2027)

No.	Pos.	Nation	Player
—	MF	BEL	Samuel Mbangula (at Bologna until 30 June 2027)
—	MF	GER	Leon Opitz (at VfL Osnabrück until 30 June 2027)

== Transactions ==
=== Transfers in ===
Date	Pos.	Nat.	Name	Club	Fee	Ref.
7 May 2026	FW	(Haiti)	Kenny Quetant	(France) Le Havre	Transfer	
22 May 2026	GK	(Estonia)	Karl Hein	(England) Arsenal	Transfer	
2 June 2026	MF	(Spain)	Chuki	(Spain) Valladolid	Free transfer	
21 June 2026	FW	(Switzerland)	Cedric Itten	(Germany) Fortuna Düsseldorf	Transfer	
26 June 2026	MF	(Poland)	Dariusz Stalmach	(Germany) 1. FC Magdeburg	Transfer	
9 July 2026	DF	(Poland)	Oskar Wójcik	(Poland) Cracovia	Transfer	
10 July 2026	GK	(Austria)	Alexander Schlager	(Austria) Red Bull Salzburg	Transfer	
14 August 2026	MF	(Netherlands)	Ludovit Reis	(Belgium) Club Brugge	Transfer	

=== Transfers out ===
Date	Pos.	Nat.	Name	Club	Fee	Ref.
23 May 2026	GK	(Germany)	Mio Backhaus	(Germany) SC Freiburg	Transfer	
12 August 2026	MF	(Austria)	Romano Schmid	(Italy) Frosinone	Transfer	
21 August 2026	MF	(Germany)	Karim Coulibaly	(France) Strasbourg	Transfer	

=== Loans in ===
Date	Pos.	Nat.	Name	Club	Duration	Ref.
17 August 2026	FW	(Turkey)	Eren Dinkçi	(Germany) SC Freiburg	30 June 2027	
18 August 2026	FW	(Germany)	Niclas Füllkrug	(England) West Ham United	30 June 2027	
31 August 2026	DF	(Netherlands)	Youri Regeer	(Netherlands) Ajax	30 June 2027	
1 September 2026	DF	(Brazil)	Arthur	(Germany) Bayer Leverkusen	30 June 2027	
1 September 2026	DF	(Senegal)	Moussa N'Diaye	(Belgium) Anderlecht	30 June 2027	

=== Loans out ===
Date	Pos.	Nat.	Name	Club	Duration	Ref.
3 September 2026	DF	(Argentina)	Julián Malatini	(United States) FC Cincinnati	30 June 2027	

== Competitions ==
=== Overall record ===
Competition	First match	Last match	Starting round	Final position	Record							
Competition	First match	Last match	Starting round	Final position	Pld	W	D	L	GF	GA	GD	Win %
Bundesliga	30 August 2025		Matchday 1		10	5	3	2	21	15	+6	50.00
DFB-Pokal	22 August 2025	27 October 2025	First round	Second Round	2	1	0	1	5	3	+2	50.00
Total					12	6	3	3	26	18	+8	50.00

Last updated: 22 November 2026
Source: Soccerway

=== Bundesliga ===
==== League table ====
Pos	Team	Pld	W	D	L	GF	GA	GD	Pts	Qualification or relegation
4	RB Leipzig	10	7	0	3	32	14	+18	21	Qualification for the Champions League league phase
5	Bayer Leverkusen	10	6	1	3	24	17	+7	19	Qualification for the Europa League league phase (Note: The 2026–27 DFB-Pokal winners also qualify for the Europa League league stage (or the sixth-placed team if the DFB-Pokal winners finish in the top five of the Bundesliga). If the DFB-Pokal winners finish in the top six of the Bundesliga, the Conference League spot will be passed to the seventh-placed team.)
6	Werder Bremen	10	5	3	2	21	15	+6	18	Qualification for the Conference League play-off round
7	Eintracht Frankfurt	10	4	3	3	16	20	−4	15	
8	VfB Stuttgart	10	4	1	5	15	15	0	13	

Updated to match(es) played on 22 November 2026. Source: Bundesliga
Rules for classification: 1) Points; 2) Goal difference; 3) Goals scored; 4) Head-to-head aggregate results; 5) Head-to-head away goals scored; 6) Away goals scored; 7) Play-off at neutral site.
(Rules 4–6 only apply after all home-and-away matches have been played between the tied teams. Rule 7 only applies after the completion of the season.)

==== Results by round – regular season ====
Round	1	2	3	4	5	6	7	8	9	10	11	12	13	14	15	16	17	18	19	20	21	22	23	24	25	26	27	28	29	30	31	32	33	34
Ground	A	H	A	H	A	H	A	H	A	H	H	A	H	A	H	A	H	H	A	H	A	H	A	H	A	H	A	H	A	A	H	A	A	H
Result	L	W	D	W	D	D	W	W	L	W																								
Position	15	10	8	8	7	8	6	5	6	6																								
Points	0	3	4	7	8	9	12	15	15	18																								

Source: http://www.bundesliga.de/
A = Away; H = Home; W = Win; D = Draw; L = Loss

==== Matches ====
30 August 2026 1	Freiburg	4–1	Werder Bremen	Freiburg
15:30 CEST (UTC+2)	Suzuki 29' (Beste) 48' 55' (Matanović); Matanović 45' (Ginter); Gotō (yellow card) 88'	Report	Reis (yellow card) 48'; Stalmach 76' (Grüll)	Stadium: Europa-Park Stadion; Attendance: 34,700; Referee: Daniel Siebert

5 September 2026 2	Werder Bremen	3–1	RB Leipzig	Bremen
15:30 CEST (UTC+2)	Dinkçi 4' (Chuki); Chuki (yellow card) 23'; Füllkrug 68' (Grüll); Grüll 80'	Report	Baku 90+5' (Maksimović)	Stadium: Weser-Stadion; Attendance: 39,713; Referee: Benjamin Brand

12 September 2026 3	1. FC Köln	1–1	Werder Bremen	Cologne
18:30 CEST (UTC+2)	Dallinga (penalty missed) 8'; Maina 11' (Skhiri); Mensah (yellow card) 86'; Okon-Engstler (yellow card) 90+2'	Report	Füllkrug 69'; Deman (yellow card) 72'	Stadium: RheinEnergieStadion; Attendance: 50,000; Referee: Florian Exner

19 September 2027 4	Werder Bremen	3–2	Augsburg	Bremen
15:30 CEST (UTC+2)	Arthur (yellow card) 27'; Grüll (yellow card) 60' (goal) 66' (Chuki); Füllkrug 86' (Grüll); Weiser 90+3' (Grüll)	Report	Massengo (yellow card) 5'; Fellhauer 18' (Rieder); Brackelmann 58' (Claude-Maurice); Behrens (yellow card) 77'	Stadium: Weserstadion; Attendance: 39,745; Referee: Bastian Dankert

9 October 2026 5	Borussia Dortmund	2–2	Werder Bremen	Dortmund
20:30 CEST (UTC+2)	Svensson; Schlotterbeck 85' (Veerman); Veerman (yellow card) 90+2'; Nmecha (yellow card) 90+4'	Report	Reis 88' (Wójcik); Stalmach (yellow card) 90'; Füllkrug 90+2' (Grüll); Thioune (yellow card) 90+8'	Stadium: Signal Iduna Park; Attendance: 81,365; Referee: Christian Dingert

17 October 2026 6	Werder Bremen	2–2	Paderborn	Bremen
14:30 CEST (UTC+2)	Füllkrug 59' (Eren Dinkçi) 65' (pen.); Regeer (yellow card) 86'	Report	Marino (yellow card) 4' (goal) 18' (Tigges); Tigges 30'	Stadium: Weserstadion; Attendance: 40,517; Referee: Robert Schröder

24 October 2026 7	Mainz 05	2–3	Werder Bremen	Mainz
19:30 CEST (UTC+2)	Caci 33' (Becker); Lee Jae-Sung 63' (Caci); Mwene (yellow card) 69'; Schwolow (yellow card) 90+4'	Report	Füllkrug 7' (pen.) 25' (pen.); Reis (yellow card) 38' (goal) 61' (Grüll)	Stadium: MEWA Arena; Attendance: 33,305; Referee: Florian Badstübner

31 October 2026 8	Werder Bremen	2–0	TSG Hoffenheim	Bremen
15:30 CET (UTC+1)	Füllkrug 57' (Hein); Friedl (yellow card) 60'; Dinkçi 82' (Grüll); Arthur (yellow card) 90+2'; Regeer (yellow card) 90+2'	Report		Stadium: Weserstadion; Attendance: 39,807; Referee: Tobias Reichel

7 November 2026 9	Stuttgart	1–0	Werder Bremen	Stuttgart
16:30 CET (UTC+1)	Mittelstädt 7' (Prömel)	Report	Füllkrug (yellow card) 24'; Deman (yellow card) 45'; Grüll (yellow card) 53'	Stadium: MHPArena; Attendance: 60,000; Referee: Sören Storks

22 November 2026 10	Werder Bremen	4–0	Hamburger SV	Bremen
16:30 CET	Pieper (yellow card) 10'; Chuki (yellow card) 39'; Deman (yellow card) 50'; Fried 55'; Njinmah 66' (Füllkrug), 70' (Reis); Füllkrug 90+2'	Report	Omari (yellow card) 23'; Capaldo (yellow card) 74'; Grønbæk (yellow card) 84'	Stadium: Weserstadion; Referee: Florian Badstübner

27 November 2026 11	Werder Bremen	v	Borussia Mönchengladbach	Bremen
15:30 CET		Report		Stadium: Weserstadion

5 December 2026 12	Eintracht Frankfurt	v	Werder Bremen	Frankfurt
		Report		Stadium: Deutsche Bank Park

12 December 2026 13	Werder Bremen	v	Bayer Leverkusen	Bremen
		Report		Stadium: Weserstadion

19 December 2026 14	Bayern Munich	v	Werder Bremen	Munich
--:-- CET		Report		Stadium: Allianz Arena

9 January 2027 15	Werder Bremen	v	Union Berlin	Bremen
		Report		Stadium: Weserstadion

12 January 2027 16	Schalke 04	v	Werder Bremen	Gelsenkirchen
		Report		Stadium: Veltins-Arena

16 January 2027 17	Werder Bremen	v	Elversberg	Bremen
		Report		Stadium: Weserstadion

23 January 2027 18	Werder Bremen	v	Freiburg	Bremen
		Report		Stadium: Weserstadion

30 January 2027 19	RB Leipzig	v	Werder Bremen	Leipzig
		Report		Stadium: Red Bull Arena

6 February 2027 20	Werder Bremen	v	1. FC Köln	Bremen
		Report		Stadium: Weserstadion

11-13 February 2027 21	Augsburg	v	Werder Bremen	Augsburg
		Report		Stadium: WWK Arena

20 February 2027 22	Werder Bremen	v	Borussia Dortmund	Bremen
		Report		Stadium: Weserstadion

27 February 2027 23	Paderborn	v	Werder Bremen	Paderborn
		Report		Stadium: Home Deluxe Arena

2 March 2027 24	Werder Bremen	v	Mainz 05	Bremen
		Report		Stadium: Weserstadion

6 March 2027 25	TSG Hoffenheim	v	Werder Bremen	Sinsheim
		Report		Stadium: SNP Arena

13 March 2027 26	Werder Bremen	v	Stuttgart	Bremen
		Report		Stadium: Weserstadion

20 March 2027 27	Hamburger SV	v	Werder Bremen	Hamburg
		Report		Stadium: Volksparkstadion

3 April 2027 28	Borussia Mönchengladbach	v	Werder Bremen	Mönchengladbach
15:30 CEST		Report		Stadium: Borussia-Park

10 April 2027 29	Werder Bremen	v	Eintracht Frankfurt	Bremen
		Report		Stadium: Weserstadion

17 April 2027 30	Bayer Leverkusen	v	Werder Bremen	Leverkusen
		Report		Stadium: BayArena

24 April 2027 31	Werder Bremen	v	Bayern Munich	Bremen
		Report		Stadium: Weserstadion

8 May 2027 32	Union Berlin	v	Werder Bremen	Berlin
		Report		Stadium: Stadion An der Alten Försterei

14–16 May 2027 33	Werder Bremen	v	Schalke 04	Bremen
		Report		Stadium: Weserstadion

22 May 2027 34	Elversberg	v	Werder Bremen	Spiesen-Elversberg
		Report		Stadium: Waldstadion an der Kaiserlinde

=== DFB-Pokal ===
22 August 2026 First Round	Lüneburger	0–3	Werder Bremen	Hamburg
15:30		Report	Stage 11' (Deman); Füllkrug (yellow card) 44' (goal) 53' (pen.); Reis 76' (Grüll)	Stadium: Millerntor-Stadion; Attendance: 29,330; Referee: Fabienne Michel

27 October 2026 Second Round	Borussia Dortmund	3–2	Werder Bremen	Dortmund
20:45	Guirassy 6'; Chukwuemeka 17'; Veerman (yellow card) 49'; Ryerson (yellow card) 64'; Sabitzer 90+3'	Report	Pieper (yellow card) 24'; Arthur (yellow card) 57'; Füllkrug 65' (pen.), 68'	Stadium: Signal Iduna Park; Attendance: 81,365; Referee: Robert Schröder

== Statistics ==
As of 22 November 2026

=== Appearances and goals ===
No.	Pos	Nat	Player	Total		Bundesliga		DFB Pokal	
No.	Pos	Nat	Player	Apps	Goals	Apps	Goals	Apps	Goals
1	GK	(Estonia) EST	Karl Hein	11	0	10	0	1	0
2	MF	(Belgium) BEL	Olivier Deman	11	0	10	0	1	0
3	DF	(Poland) POL	Oskar Wójcik	4	0	0+4	0	0	0
5	DF	(Germany) GER	Amos Pieper	12	0	10	0	2	0
6	MF	(Denmark) DEN	Jens Stage	1	1	0	0	1	1
8	DF	(Germany) GER	Mitchell Weiser	7	1	2+4	1	0+1	0
10	FW	(Germany) GER	Niclas Füllkrug	12	13	10	10	1+1	3
11	FW	(Germany) GER	Justin Njinmah	4	2	2+1	2	1	0
13	DF	(Brazil) BRA	Arthur	10	0	9	0	1	0
14	MF	(Belgium) BEL	Senne Lynen	5	0	2+1	0	1+1	0
15	MF	(Netherlands) NED	Ludovit Reis	12	3	10	2	1+1	1
17	FW	(Austria) AUT	Marco Grüll	11	2	9	2	1+1	0
18	MF	(Turkey) TUR	Eren Dinkçi	10	2	7+2	2	1	0
20	MF	(Spain) ESP	Chuki	12	0	9+1	0	1+1	0
23	MF	(Poland) POL	Dariusz Stalmach	8	1	0+7	1	1	0
26	FW	(Switzerland) SUI	Cedric Itten	8	0	0+6	0	1+1	0
29	FW	(Germany) GER	Salim Musah	4	0	0+3	0	0+1	0
30	GK	(Austria) AUT	Alexander Schlager	1	0	0	0	1	0
32	DF	(Austria) AUT	Marco Friedl	12	1	10	1	2	0
33	DF	(Germany) GER	Mick Schmetgens	9	0	1+6	0	2	0
38	FW	(Germany) GER	Paul Erevbenagie	6	0	0+5	0	0+1	0
44	MF	(Netherlands) NED	Youri Regeer	10	0	9	0	1	0
Players away from the club on loan:
--	MF	(Croatia) CRO	Patrice Čović	1	0	0+1	0	0	0
--	MF	(Belgium) BEL	Samuel Mbangula	1	0	0	0	1	0
Players who left Werder Bremen during the season:

=== Goalscorers ===
Rank	Pos.	Nat.	No.	Player	Bundesliga	DFB-Pokal	Total
1	FW	(Germany)	10	Niclas Füllkrug	10	3	13
2	MF	(Netherlands)	15	Ludovit Reis	2	1	3
3	FW	(Austria)	17	Marco Grüll	2	0	2
3	MF	(Turkey)	18	Eren Dinkçi	2	0	2
3	FW	(Germany)	11	Justin Njinmah	2	0	2
6	MF	(Poland)	23	Dariusz Stalmach	1	0	1
6	MF	(Denmark)	6	Jens Stage	0	1	1
6	DF	(Germany)	8	Mitchell Weiser	1	0	1
6	DF	(Austria)	32	Marco Friedl	1	0	1
Opponent's own goal(s)					0	0	0
Total					21	5	26

=== Assists ===
Rank	Pos.	Nat.	No.	Player	Bundesliga	DFB-Pokal	Total
1	FW	(Austria)	17	Marco Grüll	7	1	8
2	MF	(Spain)	20	Chuki	2	0	2
3	DF	(Belgium)	2	Olivier Deman	0	1	1
3	DF	(Poland)	3	Oskar Wójcik	1	0	1
3	MF	(Turkey)	18	Eren Dinkçi	1	0	1
3	GE	(Estonia)	1	Karl Hein	1	0	1
3	MF	(Netherlands)	44	Youri Regeer	0	1	1
3	FW	(Germany)	10	Niclas Füllkrug	1	0	1
MF	(Netherlands)	15	Ludovit Reis	1	0	1	
Total					14	3	17

=== Clean sheets ===
Rank	Pos.	Nat.	No.	Player	Bundesliga	DFB-Pokal	Total
1	GK	(Estonia)	1	Karl Hein	2	0	2
2	GK	(Austria)	30	Alexander Schlager	0	1	1
Total					2	1	3

=== Hat-tricks ===
Player	Against	Result	Date	Competition	Ref.

=== Disciplinary record ===
No.	Nat.	Pos.	Player	Bundesliga			DFB-Pokal			Total		
No.	Nat.	Pos.	Player	Yellow card	(yellow card) (yellow-red card)	Red card	Yellow card	(yellow card) (yellow-red card)	Red card	Yellow card	(yellow card) (yellow-red card)	Red card
2	(Belgium)	DF	Olivier Deman	3	0	0	0	0	0	3	0	0
5	(Germany)	DF	Amos Pieper	1	0	0	1	0	0	2	0	0
10	(Germany)	FW	Niclas Füllkrug	1	0	0	1	0	0	2	0	0
13	(Brazil)	DF	Arthur	2	0	0	1	0	0	3	0	0
15	(Netherlands)	MF	Ludovit Reis	2	0	0	0	0	0	2	0	0
17	(Austria)	FW	Marco Grüll	2	0	0	0	0	0	2	0	0
20	(Spain)	MF	Chuki	2	0	0	0	0	0	2	0	0
23	(Poland)	MF	Dariusz Stalmach	1	0	0	0	0	0	1	0	0
32	(Austria)	DF	Marco Friedl	1	0	0	0	0	0	1	0	0
44	(Netherlands)	MF	Youri Regeer	2	0	0	0	0	0	2	0	0
Total				17	0	0	3	0	0	20	0	0

=== Home attendance ===
Competition	Total	Matches	Average
Bundesliga	159,782	4	39,946
DFB-Pokal	0	0	0
Total	159,782	4	39,946
