= Germany national under-20 football team =

Germany Under-20
- Nickname: Die Mannschaft (The Team)
- Association: Deutscher Fußball-Bund
- Confederation: UEFA (Europe)
- Head coach: Hannes Wolf
- Most caps: Christian Schulz; Matthias Lehmann (18)
- Top scorer: Mike Hanke; Christian Eggert (8)
- FIFA code: GER
First colours	Second colours

First international
- West Germany 1–0 Mexico (Adelaide, Australia; 3 October 1981)

Biggest win
- Germany 8–1 Fiji (Christchurch, New Zealand; 1 June 2015)

Biggest defeat
- Italy 4–1 Germany (Empoli, Italy; 5 December 2001) Records for competitive matches only.

FIFA U-20 World Cup
- Appearances: 12 (first in 1981)
- Best result: Champions (1981, as West Germany)

The Germany national under-20 football team, also known as Germany Under-20s or Germany U20(s), represents Germany in association football at an under-20 age level and is controlled by German Football Association, the governing body for football in Germany.

Because there is no under-20 competition at UEFA level, Germany's under-20 side has generally only played competitive matches when it has qualified for the FIFA U-20 World Cup, which is held every 2 years, via the under-19 championship. Since the 2017–18 season, Germany also contest the Under 20 Elite League, winning the inaugural season.

== Competitive record ==
FIFA World Youth Championship/FIFA U-20 World Cup record
Year	Result	GP	W	D*	L	GS	GA
as West Germany
(Tunisia) 1977	Did not qualify						
(Japan) 1979	Did not qualify						
(Australia) 1981	Champions	6	5	0	1	12	4
(Mexico) 1983	Did not qualify						
(Soviet Union) 1985	Did not qualify						
(Chile) 1987	Runners-up	6	4	2	0	14	3
(Saudi Arabia) 1989	Did not qualify						
(Portugal) 1991	Did not qualify						
as Germany
(Australia) 1993	Group stage	3	1	1	1	4	4
(Qatar) 1995	Group stage	3	0	2	1	3	4
(Malaysia) 1997	Did not qualify						
(Nigeria) 1999	Group stage	3	1	0	2	5	4
(Argentina) 2001	Round of 16	4	2	0	2	9	6
(United Arab Emirates) 2003	Group stage	3	1	0	2	3	5
(Netherlands) 2005	Quarter-finals	5	2	1	2	6	5
(Canada) 2007	Did not qualify						
(Egypt) 2009	Quarter-finals	5	3	1	1	11	5
(Colombia) 2011	Did not qualify						
(Turkey) 2013	Did not qualify						
(New Zealand) 2015	Quarter-finals	5	4	1	0	18	3
(South Korea) 2017	Round of 16	4	1	1	2	6	8
(Poland) 2019	Did not qualify						
(Argentina) 2023	Did not qualify						
(Chile) 2025	Did not qualify						
(Azerbaijan) (Uzbekistan) 2027	Qualified						
(Armenia) (Georgia (country)) 2029	To be determined						
Total	12/25	47	24	9	14	91	51

== Players ==
=== Current squad ===
- The following players were called up for the Under 20 Elite League matches.
- Match dates: 13 and 16 November 2026
- Opposition: Poland and Czech Republic
- Caps and goals correct as of: 9 November 2026

No.	Pos.	Player	Date of birth (age)	Caps	Goals	Club
	GK	Florian Hellstern	18 October 2007 (age 19)	1	0	(German Football Association) Greuther Fürth
	GK	Lio Mark Rothenhagen	31 August 2006 (age 20)	5	0	(German Football Association) Holstein Kiel
	GK	Timo Schlieck	2 March 2006 (age 20)	0	0	(German Football Association) SC Verl
	DF	Taylan Bulut	19 January 2006 (age 20)	8	1	(Turkish Football Federation) Beşiktaş
	DF	Eric da Silva Moreira	3 May 2006 (age 20)	6	0	(Royal Dutch Football Association) Excelsior
	DF	Luca Erlein	5 July 2007 (age 19)	2	0	(German Football Association) Energie Cottbus
	DF	Almugera Kabar	6 June 2006 (age 20)	4	0	(Royal Dutch Football Association) NEC Nijmegen
	DF	Friedrich Müller	14 February 2006 (age 20)	2	0	(German Football Association) Dynamo Dresden
	DF	David Odogu	3 June 2006 (age 20)	6	0	(French Football Federation) Toulouse FC
	DF	Rafael Pinto Pedrosa	30 September 2007 (age 19)	2	0	(German Football Association) Karlsruher SC
	DF	Lukas Reich	24 October 2006 (age 20)	2	0	(German Football Association) Greuther Fürth
	DF	Mick Schmetgens	9 September 2007 (age 19)	2	0	(German Football Association) Werder Bremen
	MF	Luis Engelns	11 March 2007 (age 19)	0	0	(German Football Association) TSG Hoffenheim
	MF	Tom Meyer	22 December 2007 (age 18)	0	0	(German Football Association) VfL Bochum
	MF	Niklas Swider	5 January 2007 (age 19)	0	0	(German Football Association) Viktoria Köln
	MF	Kjell Wätjen	28 June 2006 (age 20)	5	2	(Danish Football Association) FC Midtjylland
	MF	Danyal Zor	5 June 2007 (age 19)	2	0	(German Football Association) Karlsruher SC
	FW	Farid Alfa-Ruprecht	28 March 2006 (age 20)	6	1	(German Football Association) Hertha BSC
	FW	Tim Binder	30 January 2007 (age 19)	0	0	(German Football Association) Bayern Munich
	FW	Paul Erevbenagie	19 August 2007 (age 19)	2	0	(German Football Association) Werder Bremen
	FW	Adin Ličina	6 January 2007 (age 19)	0	0	(Italian Football Federation) US Cremonese
	FW	Deniz Zeitler	13 December 2006 (age 19)	2	0	(German Football Association) SC Paderborn
	FW	Otto Stange	9 February 2007 (age 19)	2	0	(German Football Association) Hamburger SV

=== Recent call-ups ===
The following list of players have also been called up by the Germany u-20 side and still remain eligible for selection:

Pos.	Player	Date of birth (age)	Caps	Goals	Club	Latest call-up
GK	Konstantin Heide	27 January 2006 (age 20)	1	0	(Germany) Hertha BSC	v. Portugal, 13 October 2025
GK	Enis Kamga	8 July 2007 (age 19)	0	0	(Germany) Kaiserslautern	v. England, 3 October 2026
DF	Eric Porstner	9 May 2007 (age 19)	2	0	(Germany) Nürnberg	v. Italy, 29 September 2026
MF	Boris Mamuzah Lum	2 October 2007 (age 19)	3	0	(Germany) Hertha BSC	v. England, 3 October 2026
MF	Cajetan Lenz	16 June 2006 (age 20)	8	0	(Germany) TSG Hoffenheim	v. England, 3 October 2026
MF	Mirza Ćatović	1 May 2007 (age 19)	3	0	(Spain) Barcelona B	v. England, 3 October 2026
MF	Tiago Poller	27 February 2007 (age 19)	3	0	(Germany) TSG Hoffenheim	v. England, 3 October 2026
FW	Max Moerstedt	15 January 2006 (age 20)	9	8	(Germany) TSG Hoffenheim	v. England, 3 October 2026
FW	Salim Musah	22 February 2006 (age 20)	3	0	(Germany) Werder Bremen	v. France, 25 September 2026

== Records ==
=== FIFA U-20 World Cup ===
- Winner (1981^{1})
- Runners-up (1987^{1})

Notes

- 1 = as West Germany
- 2 = as East Germany

=== Under 20 Elite League ===
- Winner (2017–18)
- Runners-up (2022–23, 2023–24)

== Awards ==
=== FIFA U-20 World Cup ===
Individual

- Silver Ball: Michael Zorc (1981)
- Bronze Ball: Roland Wohlfarth (1981), Marcel Witeczek (1987)
- Golden Shoe: Marcel Witeczek (1987)
- Silver Shoe: Ralf Loose (1981), Roland Wohlfarth (1981)
- Bronze Shoe: Marc Stendera (2015)

Team

- FIFA Fair Play Award: 1987

=== Under 20 Elite League ===
Individual

- Top scorer: Robin Hack (2017–18)

== Head-to-head record ==
The following table shows Germany's head-to-head record in the FIFA U-20 World Cup.

Opponent	Pld	W	D	L	GF	GA	GD	Win %
Argentina	1	0	0	1	0	1	−1	0.00
Australia	2	1	1	0	2	1	+1	50.00
Brazil	3	0	0	3	2	6	−4	0.00
Bulgaria	1	1	0	0	3	0	+3	100.00
Cameroon	2	1	1	0	4	1	+3	50.00
Canada	1	1	0	0	4	0	+4	100.00
Chile	1	1	0	0	4	0	+4	100.00
China	1	1	0	0	3	2	+1	100.00
Costa Rica	2	0	0	2	2	4	−2	0.00
Egypt	2	1	0	1	3	2	+1	50.00
Fiji	1	1	0	0	8	1	+7	100.00
France	1	0	0	1	2	3	−1	0.00
Ghana	1	0	1	0	2	2	+0	0.00
Honduras	1	1	0	0	5	1	+4	100.00
Iraq	1	1	0	0	3	1	+2	100.00
Mali	1	0	1	0	1	1	+0	0.00
Mexico	2	1	1	0	1	0	+1	50.00
Nigeria	3	2	0	1	4	4	+0	66.67
Paraguay	2	1	0	1	4	2	+2	50.00
Portugal	1	1	0	0	1	0	+1	100.00
Qatar	1	1	0	0	4	0	+4	100.00
Romania	1	1	0	0	1	0	+1	100.00
Saudi Arabia	1	1	0	0	3	0	+3	100.00
Scotland	1	0	1	0	1	1	+0	0.00
South Korea	2	0	1	1	1	3	−2	0.00
Spain	1	1	0	0	4	2	+2	100.00
United States	4	3	1	0	8	2	+6	75.00
Uruguay	1	0	0	1	1	2	−1	0.00
Uzbekistan	1	1	0	0	3	0	+3	100.00
Vanuatu	1	1	0	0	3	2	+1	100.00
Venezuela	1	0	0	1	0	2	−2	0.00
Yugoslavia	1	0	1	0	1	1	+0	0.00
Zambia	1	0	0	1	3	4	−1	0.00
Total	47	24	9	14	91	51	+40	51.06

== See also ==
- Germany national football team
- Germany national under-21 football team
- Germany national under-17 football team
- East Germany national under-21 football team
- FIFA U-20 World Cup
- FIFA U-17 World Cup
- UEFA European Under-19 Championship
- UEFA European Under-17 Championship
