= Mick Schmetgens =

Italian footballer (born 2005)

Personal information
- Date of birth: 9 September 2007 (age 19)
- Place of birth: Buxtehude, Germany
- Height: 1.90 m (6 ft 3 in)
- Position: Centre-back

Team information
- Current team: Werder Bremen
- Number: 33

Youth career
- JFV AOBHH
- 2021–2026: Werder Bremen

Senior career*
Years	Team	Apps	(Gls)
2025–	Werder Bremen II	16	(0)
2026–	Werder Bremen	9	(0)

International career^{‡}
2023–2024	Germany U17	9	(0)
2024–2025	Germany U18	5	(0)
2025–	Germany U19	14	(1)
2026–	Germany U20	2	(0)
Medal record
Men's football
Representing Germany
UEFA European Under-19 Championship
Runner-up	2026 Wales
- * Club domestic league appearances and goals as of 31 October 2026 ‡ National team caps and goals as of 3 October 2026

Mick Schmetgens (German pronunciation: [mɪk ˈʃmɛtɡəns]; born 9 September 2007) is a German professional footballer who plays as a centre-back for Bundesliga club Werder Bremen.

== Club career ==
Schmetgens is a product of the youth academies of the German clubs JFV AOBHH and Werder Bremen. He was promoted to Werder Bremen's reserves in the Regionalliga for the 2025–26 season. On 10 December 2025, he signed his first professional contract with Werder Bremen until 2029. He debuted with the senior Werder Bremen team as a substitute in a 2–0 Bundesliga loss to Mainz on 15 March 2026.

== International career ==
Schmetgens is a youth international for Germany, having first been called up to the Germany U17s in September 2023.

== Career statistics ==
As of match played 31 October 2026

Appearances and goals by club, season and competition
Club	Season	League			National cup		Other		Total	
Club	Season	Division	Apps	Goals	Apps	Goals	Apps	Goals	Apps	Goals
Werder Bremen II	2025–26	Regionalliga Nord	12	0	—		—		12	0
Werder Bremen	2025–26	Bundesliga	2	0	—		—		2	0
Werder Bremen	2026–27	Bundesliga	7	0	2	0	—		9	0
Werder Bremen	Total		8	0	2	0	—		10	0
Career total			21	0	2	0	0	0	23	0

== Honours ==
Individual

- Fritz Walter Medal: U19 Bronze Medal 2026
