= Hubertus Hess-Grunewald =

German lawyer, football executive and politician (born 1960)

- Hess-Grunewald in 2026

President of SV Werder Bremen
- In office 24 November 2014 – 15 November 2026
- Preceded by: Klaus-Dieter Fischer
- Succeeded by: Philipp Mehrtens

Member of the Bürgerschaft of Bremen
- Incumbent
- Assumed office 8 June 2023

Personal details
- Born: 14 October 1960 (age 66) Varel, West Germany
- Party: SPD
- Occupation: Lawyer, football executive, politician

Hubertus Hess-Grunewald (born 14 October 1960) is a German lawyer, football executive and politician of the Social Democratic Party of Germany (SPD). He served as president of SV Werder Bremen from November 2014 to 15 November 2026. Since June 2023, he has been a member of the Bürgerschaft of Bremen.

== Biography ==
=== Education and legal career ===
Hess-Grunewald studied law at the University of Göttingen from 1980 to 1985. After passing his first state examination, he worked as a research assistant at the university's Institute of Labour Law in 1986 and 1987. He subsequently received a doctoral scholarship from the Hans Böckler Foundation, which lasted until 1989.

Between 1989 and 1993, he completed his legal clerkship in Bremen and passed his second state examination. In 1993, he received his doctorate with a dissertation entitled Regelungssperre durch Gesetz? Der Gesetzesvorbehalt im § 87 Abs. 1 Eingangssatz Betriebsverfassungsgesetz 1972.

Hess-Grunewald was admitted to the bar in 1993 and joined a law firm in Bremen, becoming a partner in 1997. In the same year, he specialised in labour law. His legal practice focused primarily on labour and civil service law. Following his appointment as president of Werder Bremen, he withdrew from his legal practice in early 2015.

Hess-Grunewald is married.

=== Football career ===
Hess-Grunewald became a member of SV Werder Bremen in August 1970 and played for the club's youth teams. He later supervised the club's holiday programmes. After returning to Bremen in 1989, he joined the club's fifth veterans' team at the suggestion of then club landlord Horst Münte.

Between 1993 and 1999, he was a member of the board of the club's amateur football department. He subsequently joined the supervisory board of the professional sports division, SV Werder Bremen GmbH & Co. KGaA, serving as its deputy chairman from 2005. From 2003, he also served as vice-president of the overall club.

On 24 November 2014, Hess-Grunewald was elected president of SV Werder Bremen at the club's general meeting, succeeding Klaus-Dieter Fischer. The election was decided with only two abstentions. On 10 December, the club's executive committee unanimously elected him as the club's representative on the professional football division's management board, also succeeding Fischer.

From 1 January 2015, Hess-Grunewald was responsible for the club's performance centre, football school, women's football, other sports and corporate social responsibility. His appointment to the management board meant that he left the supervisory board.

In August 2026, Hess-Grunewald announced that he would step down as president of SV Werder Bremen. He was succeeded by Philipp Mehrtens following the club's general meeting on 15 November 2026.

=== Political career ===
Hess-Grunewald has been a member of the Social Democratic Party of Germany (SPD) since 1982. Initially, he was active in university politics in Göttingen as a member of the Jusos.

He ran for the SPD in Bremen in the 2023 Bremen state election, held on 14 May 2023, as a political newcomer, occupying ninth place on the party's electoral list.

He was elected to the 21st Bürgerschaft of Bremen in 2023, receiving 2,220 personal votes. He serves as the SPD parliamentary group's spokesperson for justice and constitutional affairs.
