= Marco Grüll =

Austrian footballer (born 1998)

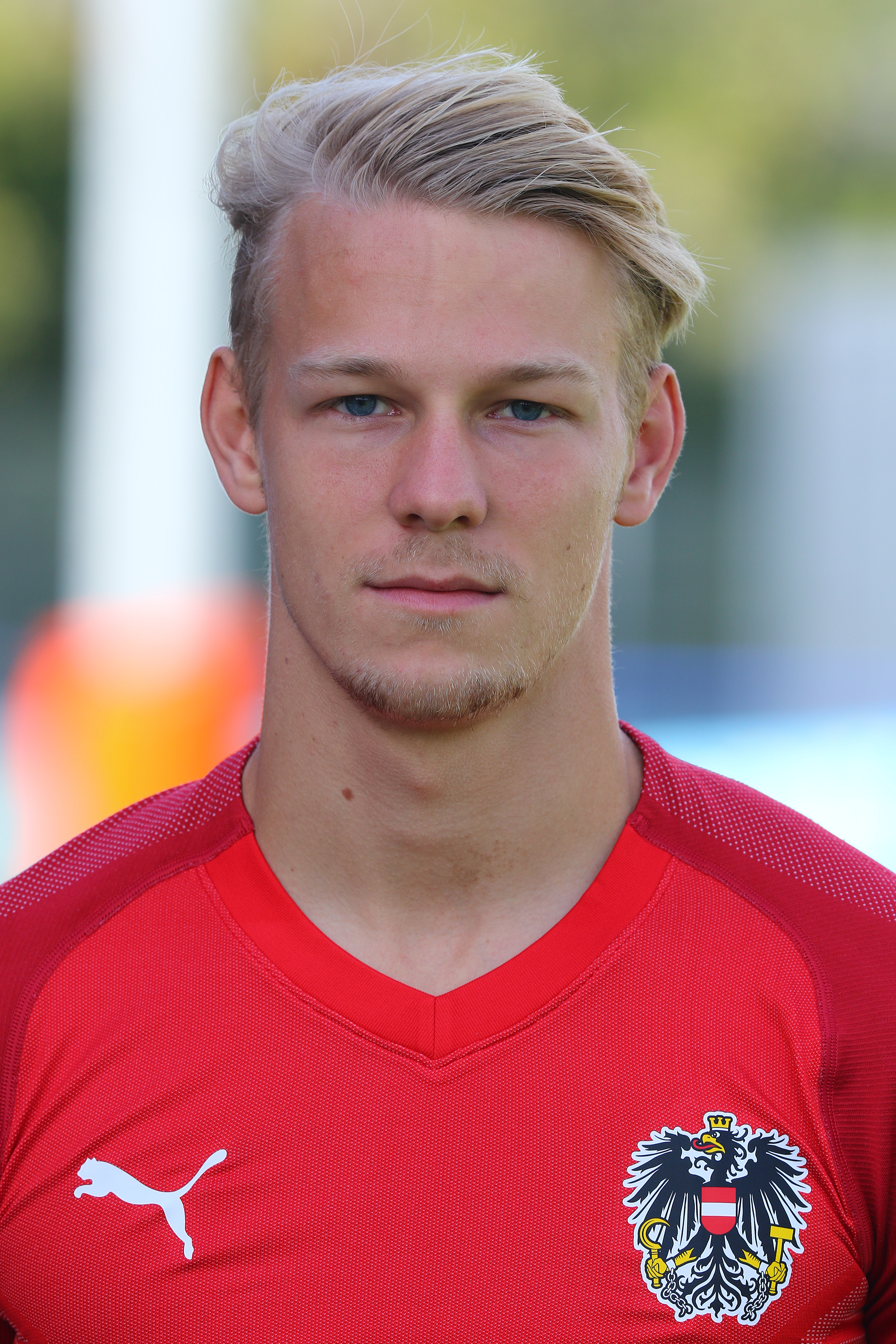
- Grüll with Austria U21 in 2019

Personal information
- Date of birth: 6 July 1998 (age 28)
- Place of birth: Schwarzach im Pongau, Austria
- Height: 1.82 m (6 ft 0 in)
- Position: Winger

Team information
- Current team: Werder Bremen
- Number: 17

Youth career
- 2004–2012: UFC Radstadt
- 2013: SC Pfarrwerfen

Senior career*
Years	Team	Apps	(Gls)
2013–2015	SC Pfarrwerfen	49	(13)
2015–2019	TSV St. Johann	99	(50)
2019–2021	SV Ried	75	(30)
2021–2024	Rapid Wien	92	(28)
2024–	Werder Bremen	71	(10)

International career^{‡}
2019	Austria U20	1	(0)
2019–2020	Austria U21	8	(2)
2021–	Austria	10	(0)
- * Club domestic league appearances and goals as of 31 October 2026 ‡ National team caps and goals as of 4 October 2026

Marco Grüll (born 6 July 1998) is an Austrian professional footballer who plays as a winger for Bundesliga club Werder Bremen and the Austria national team.

== Club career ==
Grüll started his senior team career with SC Pfarrwerfen in Austrian fifth division at the age of fifteen. He joined SV Ried in January 2019.

On 10 February 2021, Rapid Wien announced that Grüll would join the club on a free transfer prior to 2021–22 season.

In February 2024, it was announced that Grüll would move to Bundesliga side Werder Bremen in July.

== International career ==
Grüll is a former Austrian youth international. In March 2021, he was named in the reserve list of the senior team for 2022 FIFA World Cup qualification matches against Scotland, Faroe Islands and Denmark. In October 2021, he received his first call-up to the Austrian senior team after several players from original squad withdrew due to injury. He made his debut on 12 October 2021 in a World Cup qualifier against Denmark.

== Career statistics ==
=== Club ===
As of match played 31 October 2026

Appearances and goals by club, season and competition
Club	Season	League			National cup		Europe		Total	
Club	Season	Division	Apps	Goals	Apps	Goals	Apps	Goals	Apps	Goals
SV Ried	2018–19	2. Liga	15	6	—		—		15	6
SV Ried	2019–20	2. Liga	29	13	3	1	—		32	14
SV Ried	2020–21	Austrian Bundesliga	31	11	2	0	—		33	11
SV Ried	Total		75	30	5	1	—		80	31
Rapid Wien	2021–22	Austrian Bundesliga	33	9	4	2	14 (Note: Two appearances in UEFA Champions League, ten appearances and four goals in UEFA Europa League, two appearances and one goal in UEFA Europa Conference League)	5	51	16
Rapid Wien	2022–23	Austrian Bundesliga	30	6	6	1	6 (Note: Appearances in UEFA Europa Conference League)	2	42	9
Rapid Wien	2023–24	Austrian Bundesliga	29	13	5	6	5	2	39	21
Rapid Wien	Total		92	28	15	9	25	9	132	46
Werder Bremen	2024–25	Bundesliga	30	5	4	0	—		34	5
Werder Bremen	2025–26	Bundesliga	33	3	1	0	—		34	3
Werder Bremen	2026–27	Bundesliga	8	2	2	0	—		10	2
Werder Bremen	Total		71	10	7	0	—		78	10
Career total			238	68	27	10	25	9	290	87

=== International ===
As of match played 4 October 2026

Appearances and goals by national team and year
National team	Year	Apps	Goals
Austria	2021	3	0
Austria	2022	1	0
Austria	2023	0	0
Austria	2024	1	0
Austria	2025	3	0
Austria	2026	2	0
Total		10	0

== Honours ==
Individual

- Austrian Bundesliga Team of the Year: 2021–22
- Austrian Cup Top score: 2023–24
