= Ludovit Reis =

Dutch born Slovak footballer (born 2000)

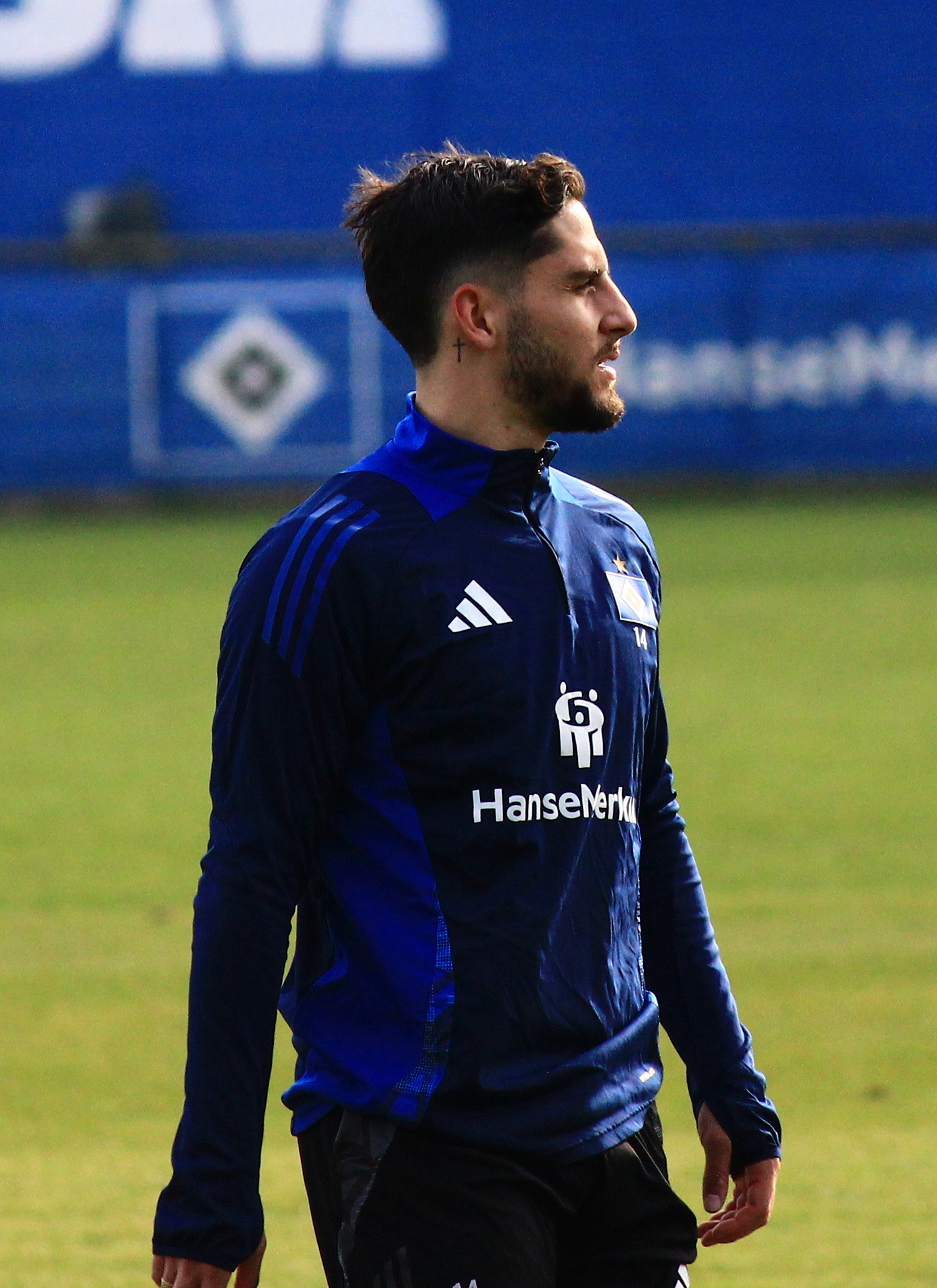
- Reis in 2025 with Hamburger SV

Personal information
- Date of birth: 1 June 2000 (age 26)
- Place of birth: Haarlem, Netherlands
- Height: 1.78 m (5 ft 10 in)
- Position: Midfielder

Team information
- Current team: Werder Bremen
- Number: 15

Youth career
- 2013–2015: Hoofddorp
- 2015–2017: Groningen

Senior career*
Years	Team	Apps	(Gls)
2017–2018	Jong Groningen	14	(0)
2017–2019	Groningen	45	(2)
2019–2021	Barcelona B	22	(0)
2020–2021	→ VfL Osnabrück (loan)	27	(1)
2021–2025	Hamburger SV	116	(19)
2025–2026	Club Brugge	7	(0)
2026–	Werder Bremen	8	(2)

International career^{‡}
2018–2019	Netherlands U19	7	(0)
2019–2022	Netherlands U21	15	(0)
2026–	Slovakia	2	(0)
- * Club domestic league appearances and goals as of 31 October 2026 ‡ National team caps and goals as of 17:17, 18 November 2026 (UTC)

Ludovit Reis (born 1 June 2000) is a professional footballer who plays as a midfielder for Bundesliga club Werder Bremen. Born in the Netherlands, he plays for the Slovakia national team.

== Club career ==
=== Groningen ===
Reis played in the youth departments of SV Hoofddorp and FC Groningen. In 2017, he signed a contract with Groningen, keeping him in the club until 2020. On 21 September 2017, he made his professional debut for the first team in a Dutch Cup match, starting against USV Hercules. He was substituted off for Ajdin Hrustic in the 59th minute, as the match ended 4–2 to Groningen.

On 29 October 2017, Reis scored his first first-team goal in the Eredivisie against Sparta Rotterdam. Thereby he became the first player to be born in the 2000s to score in the first division of Dutch football. On 19 November 2017, he received his second yellow card in a match against Vitesse, becoming the youngest player ever in the Eredivisie to be sent off.

=== Barcelona ===
After Groningen were knocked out by Vitesse in the 2018–19 Dutch play-offs for European competitions 4–3 on aggregate, Reis signed a five-year contract with FC Barcelona until 2024. Barcelona paid an initial fee of around €3m, which could rise to €8m if various clauses were met. He was assigned to the reserves in Segunda División B, and he made his debut on 25 August 2020 in a 2–0 away win against CF Badalona.

==== Loan to VfL Osnabrück ====
On 3 October 2020, Reis joined 2. Bundesliga side VfL Osnabrück on a season-long loan. At the end of the season, Osnabrück were relegated after losing to FC Ingolstadt 04 in the relegation playoff.

=== Hamburger SV ===
On 28 June 2021, Reis joined Hamburger SV and signed a four-year contract, with Barcelona retaining 25% of the rights to any future transfer sale.

In June 2023, after Hamburg had failed to win promotion, Reis was linked with a move away; however, Reis and the club announced that he would be staying in Hamburg for another season.

Staying for a fourth season at Hamburg, Reis tore a muscle against Nürnberg in a league match on 3 November 2024, seeing him miss the rest of the year.

During Reis' rehabilitation, coach Steffen Baumgart was dismissed due to poor results and was succeeded by his assistant Merlin Polzin. Reis made his comeback in January in an away match against Hertha BSC.

Reis would have to wait another month before making his first start under the new manager, remaining a regular starter each week for the rest of the season.

Hamburg rallied during the campaign, finally clinching promotion back to the top flight of German football on 10 May 2025, thanks to a 6–1 home win over SSV Ulm. Reis played a key role by scoring the equaliser after Hamburg had conceded early to the relegation strugglers. The result secured second-place for Hamburg, seeing them return to the top flight after 2555 days.

At the end of the season it was announced that Reis would transfer to Club Brugge after 129 official matches.

=== Club Brugge ===
On 25 June 2025, after four years at Hamburg, Reis joined Belgian side Club Brugge in the Jupiler Pro League for a €7 million estimated fee.

=== Werder Bremen ===
On 14 August 2026, Reis signed for Bundesliga side Werder Bremen.

== International career ==
Reis was born in the Netherlands to Slovak parents which makes him eligible to represent both the Netherlands and Slovakia internationally. He has played for the Dutch U19 team since 2018, playing five matches in the 2019 UEFA European Under-19 Championship qualifiers.

Reis was part of the Dutch U21 team in the 2021 UEFA European Under-21 Championship and played in the group stage. He was called up for the squad in the knockout stage, but withdrew in order to play for his club side Osnabrück in the 2. Bundesliga relegation playoff.

For the international break of November 2026, Reis made the decision to represent the senior Slovakia national team, with national team coach Vladimír Weiss stating "it was only a matter of one phone call". He was called up for the matches against the Faroe Islands and Kazachstan in the UEFA Nations League, and made his debut for Slovakia against the Faroe Islands on 13 November 2026.

== Career statistics ==
As of matched played 31 October 2026

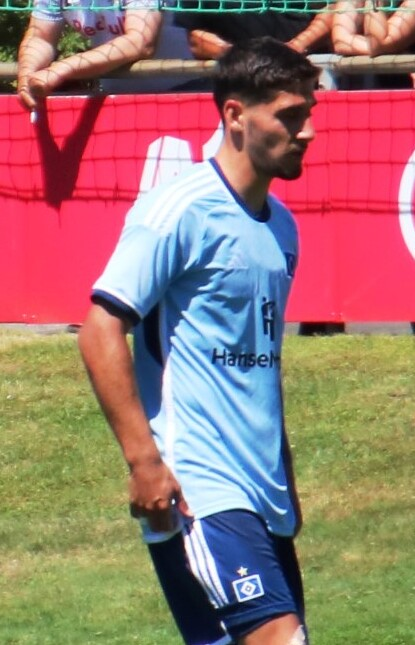
Reis playing for Hamburger SV in 2023

Appearances and goals by club, season and competition
Club	Season	League			National cup (Note: Includes KNVB Cup, DFB-Pokal)		Europe		Other		Total	
Club	Season	Division	Apps	Goals	Apps	Goals	Apps	Goals	Apps	Goals	Apps	Goals
Jong Groningen	2017–18	Derde Divisie	13	0	—		—		—		13	0
Jong Groningen	2018–19	Derde Divisie	1	0	—		—		—		1	0
Jong Groningen	Total		14	0	0	0	0	0	0	0	14	0
Groningen	2017–18	Eredivisie	16	1	2	0	—		—		18	1
Groningen	2018–19	Eredivisie	29	1	1	0	—		2 (Note: Appearances in 2018–19 European play-offs)	0	32	1
Groningen	Total		45	2	3	0	0	0	2	0	50	2
Barcelona Atlètic	2019–20	Segunda División B	22	0	—		—		3 (Note: Appearances in 2020 Segunda División B play-offs)	0	25	0
Barcelona Atlètic	2020–21	Segunda División B	0	0	—		—		—		0	0
Barcelona Atlètic	Total		22	0	0	0	0	0	3	0	25	0
VfL Osnabrück (loan)	2020–21	2. Bundesliga	27	1	1	0	—		2 (Note: Appearances in 2020–21 relegation play-offs)	0	30	1
Hamburger SV	2021–22	2. Bundesliga	32	5	5	0	—		2 (Note: Appearances in 2021–22 promotion play-offs)	0	39	5
Hamburger SV	2022–23	2. Bundesliga	33	9	2	0	—		2 (Note: Appearances in 2022–23 relegation play-offs)	0	37	9
Hamburger SV	2023–24	2. Bundesliga	25	3	0	0	—		—		25	3
Hamburger SV	2024–25	2. Bundesliga	26	2	2	0	—		—		28	2
Hamburger SV	Total		116	19	9	0	0	0	4	0	129	19
Club Brugge	2025–26	Belgian Pro League	7	0	0	0	3 (Note: Appearances in UEFA Champions League)	0	1 (Note: Appearance in Belgian Super Cup)	0	11	0
Werder Bremen	2026–27	Bundesliga	8	2	2	1	—		—		10	3
Career total			239	24	15	1	3	0	12	0	269	25

=== International ===
As of match played 16 November 2026

Appearances and goals by national team and year
National team	Year	Apps	Goals
Slovakia	2026	2	0
Total		2	0
