= Kenny Quetant =

Haitian footballer (born 2006)

Personal information
- Date of birth: 17 July 2006 (age 20)
- Place of birth: Paris, France
- Height: 1.89 m (6 ft 2 in)
- Position: Striker

Team information
- Current team: Werder Bremen
- Number: 19

Youth career
- –2020: Torcy
- 2020–2025: Le Havre

Senior career*
Years	Team	Apps	(Gls)
2023–2026	Le Havre B	1 (Note: Statistics only available for the 2023–24 Championnat National 3.)	(0)
2025–2026	Le Havre	9	(1)
2026–	Werder Bremen	0	(0)
2026–	Werder Bremen II	5	(0)

International career^{‡}
2026–	Haiti	3	(0)
- * Club domestic league appearances and goals as of 22:40, 9 October 2026 (UTC) ‡ National team caps and goals as of 4 October 2026

Kenny Quetant (born 17 July 2006) is a professional footballer who plays as a striker for Bundesliga club Werder Bremen. Born in France, he represents the Haiti national team.

== Career ==
Born in Paris, France, of Reunionese and Malagasy roots, Quetant joined the youth academy of Le Havre from Torcy in 2020. He made his first start for Le Havre in a 2–0 defeat to Amiens in the Coupe de France on 21 December 2025. On 4 January 2026, he scored his first professional goal in a 2–1 win over Angers, becoming Le Havre's fourth-youngest Ligue 1 goalscorer in the 21st century.

In May 2026, Bundesliga club Werder Bremen announced that Quetant would join the club for the upcoming 2026–27 season. He reportedly signed a contract until 2030 with the option of a further year.

== International eligibility ==
Queltant is eligible to represent either the France national team or the Haiti national team as he is also of Haitian descent. On 24 September 2026, he made his debut for Haiti in a 3–2 win over Trinidad and Tobago.

== Career statistics ==
=== Club ===
As of match played 10 October 2026

Appearances and goals by club, season and competition
Club	Season	League			National cup (Note: Includes Coupe de France)		Other		Total	
Club	Season	Division	Apps	Goals	Apps	Goals	Apps	Goals	Apps	Goals
Le Havre B	2023–24	National 3	1	0	—		—		1	0
Le Havre	2025–26	Ligue 1	9	1	1	0	—		10	1
Werder Bremen	2026–27	Bundesliga	0	0	0	0	—		0	0
Werder Bremen II	2026–27	Regionalliga Nord	5	0	0	0	—		5	0
Career total			15	1	1	0	0	0	16	1

=== International ===
As of match played 4 October 2026

Appearances and goals by national team and year
National team	Year	Apps	Goals
Haiti	2026	3	0
Total		3	0
