= Olivier Deman =

Belgian footballer (born 2000)

Personal information
- Date of birth: 6 April 2000 (age 26)
- Place of birth: Antwerp, Belgium
- Height: 1.81 m (5 ft 11 in)
- Positions: Left-back; left midfielder

Team information
- Current team: Werder Bremen
- Number: 2

Senior career*
Years	Team	Apps	(Gls)
2019–2023	Cercle Brugge	80	(3)
2023–	Werder Bremen	61	(3)
2025	→ Antwerp (loan)	20	(0)

International career^{‡}
2021–2023	Belgium U21	7	(1)
2023–	Belgium	3	(0)
- * Club domestic league appearances and goals as of 31 October 2026 ‡ National team caps and goals as of 23:04, 23 March 2024 (UTC)

Olivier Deman (born 6 April 2000) is a Belgian professional footballer who plays as a left-back or left midfielder for Bundesliga club Werder Bremen and the Belgium national team.

== Club career ==
On 31 August 2023, Deman left Cercle Brugge to join Bundesliga club Werder Bremen.

On 6 January 2025, he moved on loan to Antwerp until the end of the 2024–25 season.

== International career ==
In June 2023, Deman was called up to the senior Belgium squad for the UEFA Euro 2024 qualifying matches against Austria and Estonia on 17 and 20 June 2023 respectively.

== Career statistics ==
=== Club ===
As of match played 31 October 2026

Appearances and goals by club, season and competition
Club	Season	League			National cup		Other		Total	
Club	Season	Division	Apps	Goals	Apps	Goals	Apps	Goals	Apps	Goals
Cercle Brugge	2018–19	Belgian Pro League	1	0	0	0	–		1	0
Cercle Brugge	2019–20	Belgian Pro League	3	0	0	0	–		3	0
Cercle Brugge	2020–21	Belgian Pro League	9	0	3	1	–		12	1
Cercle Brugge	2021–22	Belgian Pro League	32	2	2	0	–		34	2
Cercle Brugge	2022–23	Belgian Pro League	30	1	2	0	6 (Note: Appearances in Belgian Pro League European play-offs)	0	38	1
Cercle Brugge	2023–24	Belgian Pro League	5	0	0	0	–		5	0
Cercle Brugge	Total		80	3	7	1	6	0	93	4
Werder Bremen	2023–24	Bundesliga	29	2	0	0	–		29	2
Werder Bremen	2024–25	Bundesliga	9	0	2	0	–		11	0
Werder Bremen	2025–26	Bundesliga	16	1	1	0	–		17	1
Werder Bremen	2026–27	Bundesliga	8	0	1	0	–		9	0
Werder Bremen	Total		62	3	4	0	–		66	3
Antwerp (loan)	2024–25	Belgian Pro League	20	0	3	0	–		23	0
Career total			162	5	14	1	6	0	182	7

=== International ===
As of match played 23 March 2024

Appearances and goals by national team and year
National team	Year	Apps	Goals
Belgium	2023	2	0
Belgium	2024	1	0
Total		3	0
