= Salim Musah =

German footballer (born 2010)

Personal information
- Full name: Salim Amani Musah
- Date of birth: 23 February 2006 (age 20)
- Place of birth: Oldenburg, Germany
- Height: 1.98 m (6 ft 6 in)
- Position: Forward

Team information
- Current team: Werder Bremen
- Number: 29

Youth career
- –2017: VfL Oldenburg
- 2017–2025: Werder Bremen

Senior career*
Years	Team	Apps	(Gls)
2025–	Werder Bremen II	9	(5)
2026–	Werder Bremen	11	(1)

International career^{‡}
2026–	Germany U20	2	(0)
- * Club domestic league appearances and goals as of 19 September 2026 ‡ National team caps and goals as of 31 March 2026

Salim Amani Musah (born 23 February 2006) is a German professional footballer who plays as a forward for Bundesliga club Werder Bremen.

== Early life ==
Musah was born on 23 February 2006. Born in Oldenburg, Germany, he is a native of the city.

== Club career ==
As a youth player, Musah joined the youth academy of VfL Oldenburg. Following his stint there, he joined the youth academy of Bundesliga side Werder Bremen ahead of the 2017–18 season and was promoted to the club's senior team in 2026.

== International career ==
Born in Germany, Musah is of Ghanaian descent. He is a Germany youth international. During the spring of 2026, he played for the Germany national under-20 football team for the Under 20 Elite League.

== Style of play ==
Musah plays as a forward. Ghanaian news website Ghanasoccernet.com wrote in 2026 that he "impressed with his physical presence, speed and ability to shield the ball".

== Career statistics ==
As of match played 19 September 2026

Appearances and goals by club, season and competition
Club	Season	League			National cup		Europe		Other		Total	
Club	Season	Division	Apps	Goals	Apps	Goals	Apps	Goals	Apps	Goals	Apps	Goals
Werder Bremen II	2025–26	Regionalliga Nord	9	5	—		—		—		9	5
Werder Bremen	2025–26	Bundesliga	8	1	0	0	—		—		8	1
Werder Bremen	2026–27	Bundesliga	3	0	1	0	—		—		4	0
Werder Bremen	Total		11	1	1	0	—		—		12	1
Career total			20	6	1	0	0	0	0	0	21	6
