= Marco Friedl =

Austrian footballer (born 1998)

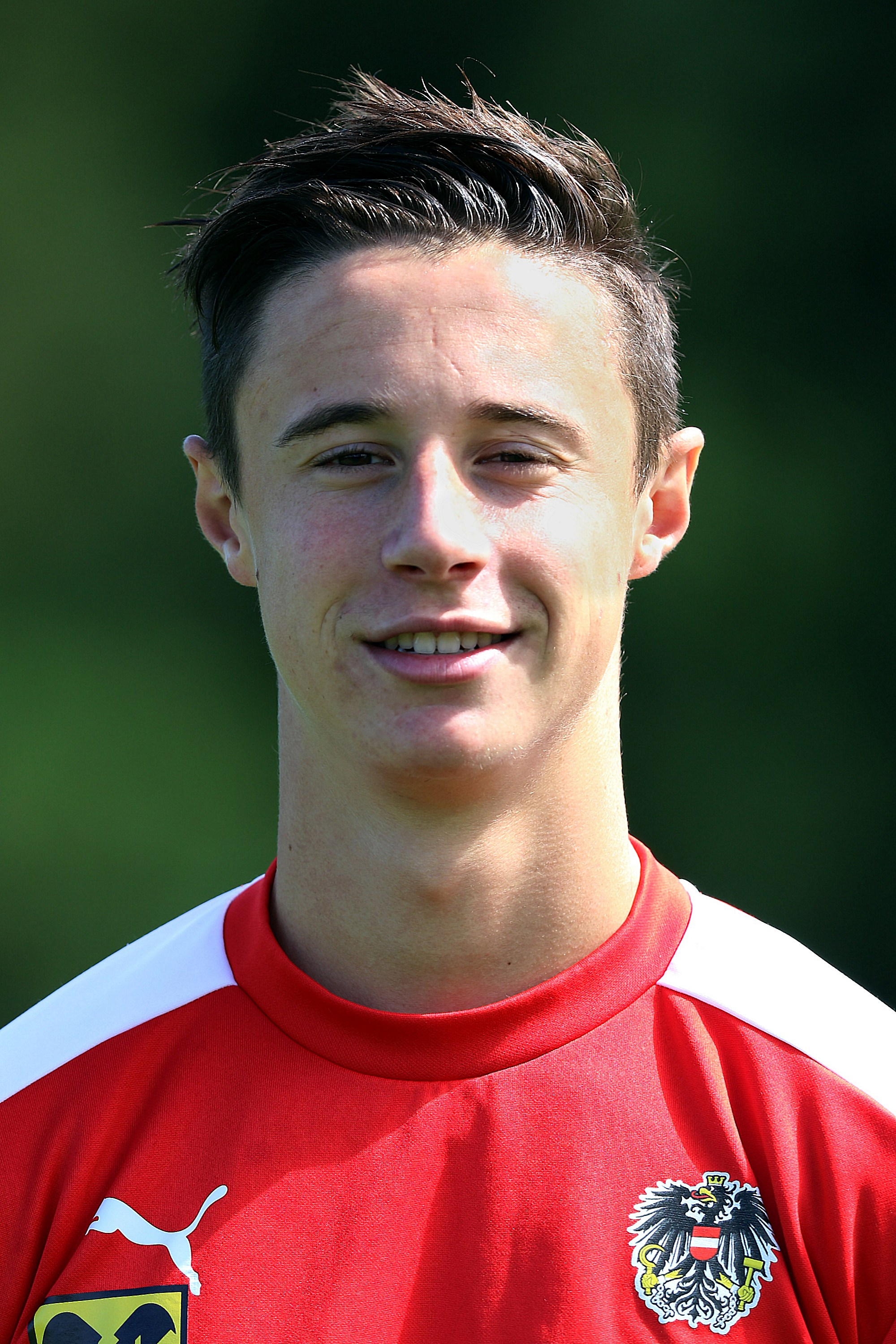
- Friedl with Austria U21 in 2017

Personal information
- Date of birth: 16 March 1998 (age 28)
- Place of birth: Kirchbichl, Austria
- Height: 1.87 m (6 ft 2 in)
- Positions: Centre-back; left-back

Team information
- Current team: Werder Bremen
- Number: 32

Youth career
- 2002–2007: SV Kirchbichl
- 2007–2008: FC Kufstein
- 2008–2017: Bayern Munich

Senior career*
Years	Team	Apps	(Gls)
2015–2017	Bayern Munich II	14	(1)
2017–2019	Bayern Munich	1	(0)
2018–2019	→ Werder Bremen (loan)	16	(0)
2018–2019	→ Werder Bremen II (loan)	1	(0)
2019–	Werder Bremen	205	(7)

International career^{‡}
2013	Austria U15	2	(2)
2013–2014	Austria U16	8	(1)
2014–2015	Austria U17	3	(0)
2015–2016	Austria U18	2	(0)
2016–2017	Austria U19	9	(0)
2017–2020	Austria U21	24	(3)
2020–	Austria	13	(0)
- * Club domestic league appearances and goals as of 17:30, 31 October 2026 (UTC) ‡ National team caps and goals as of 18:55, 27 September 2026 (UTC)

Marco Friedl (born 16 March 1998) is an Austrian professional footballer who plays as a centre-back for Bundesliga club Werder Bremen, which he captains, and the Austria national team.

== Club career ==
=== Youth career ===
Friedl began his youth career at hometown club SV Kirchbichl in 2002, before moving to fellow Austrian club FC Kufstein in 2007. In 2008, he moved to the youth academy of German club Bayern Munich.

In 2017, Friedl won the 2016–17 A-Junioren Bundesliga Süd/Südwest with Bayern's under-19 team, scoring five goals during the season. The team went on to advance to the final of the A-Junioren Bundesliga championship round, before losing to Borussia Dortmund 8–7 on penalties.

=== Bayern Munich ===
Friedl began his senior career with Bayern Munich II in the 2015–16 season, making his debut in the Regionalliga Bayern on 22 November 2015 in a 2–0 derby loss against 1860 Munich II.

On 14 March 2017, Friedl signed his first professional contract with Bayern, lasting from 1 July 2017 through 30 June 2021.

Friedl scored his first goal for Bayern Munich II in the Regionalliga Bayern on 27 October 2017, opening the scoring in a 1–1 home draw against FV Illertissen.

Friedl began his first team career with Bayern Munich in the 2017–18 season, making his professional debut as a starter in the UEFA Champions League on 22 November 2017 in a 2–1 away win against Anderlecht. Three days later, Friedl made his league debut for the first team when he came on as a half-time substitute for James Rodríguez in the Bundesliga away match against Borussia Mönchengladbach, which finished as a 1–2 loss for Bayern.

=== Werder Bremen (loan) ===
On 25 January 2018, Friedl signed with Werder Bremen on an 18-month loan deal from Bayern Munich without an option to buy, lasting until 30 June 2019.

=== Werder Bremen ===
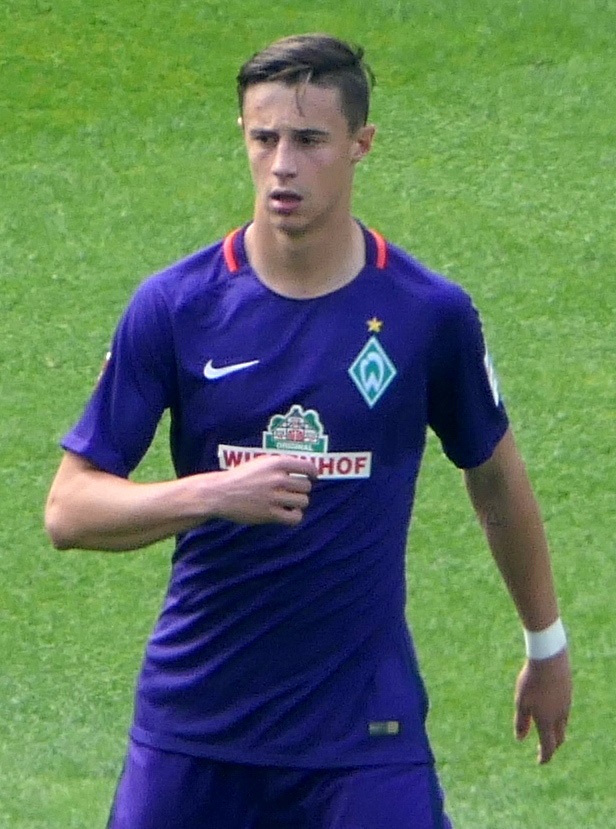
Friedl with Werder Bremen in 2018

In May 2019, Werder Bremen announced the permanent signing of Friedl for the 2019–20 season. Friedl agreed a "long-term" contract with the club. The transfer fee was reported as €3 million or up to €3.5 million including possible bonuses, depending on the source.

Friedl scored his first Bundesliga goal on the sixth matchday of the season, against Borussia Dortmund in a 2–2 draw.

In July 2022, following Werder Bremen's return to the Bundesliga in the 2021–22 season, Friedl agreed a contract extension with the club. Later that month, he was named as the club's captain ahead of the 2022–23 season. In April 2025, he extended his contract with the club.

== International career ==
=== Youth ===
After progressing through the youth teams, Friedl made his Austria under-21 debut on 8 June 2017 in a qualification match for the 2019 UEFA European Under-21 Championship against Gibraltar. He opened the scoring in the 6th minute in the 3–0 home win.

=== Senior ===
Friedl made his national team debut on 7 October 2020 in a friendly against Greece.

On 18 May 2026, Friedl was selected in Ralf Rangnick’s 26-man squad for the 2026 FIFA World Cup, marking Austria’s first appearance in the tournament since 1998.

== Career statistics ==
=== Club ===
As of match played 31 October 2026

Appearances and goals by club, season and competition
Club	Season	League			National cup		Europe		Other		Total	
Club	Season	Division	Apps	Goals	Apps	Goals	Apps	Goals	Apps	Goals	Apps	Goals
Bayern Munich II	2015–16	Regionalliga Bayern	4	0	—		—		—		4	0
Bayern Munich II	2017–18	Regionalliga Bayern	10	1	—		—		—		10	1
Bayern Munich II	Total		14	1	—						14	1
Bayern Munich	2017–18	Bundesliga	1	0	0	0	1 (Note: Appearance in UEFA Champions League)	0	0	0	2	0
Werder Bremen (loan)	2017–18	Bundesliga	9	0	0	0	—		—		9	0
Werder Bremen (loan)	2018–19	Bundesliga	7	0	2	0	—		—		9	0
Werder Bremen (loan)	Total		16	0	2	0	0	0	0	0	18	0
Werder Bremen II (loan)	2017–18	3. Liga	1	0	—		—		—		1	0
Werder Bremen	2019–20	Bundesliga	27	1	3	1	—		2 (Note: Appearances in Bundesliga relegation play-offs)	0	32	2
Werder Bremen	2020–21	Bundesliga	32	0	2	0	—		–		34	0
Werder Bremen	2021–22	2. Bundesliga	27	4	1	0	—		–		28	4
Werder Bremen	2022–23	Bundesliga	30	0	1	0	—		–		31	0
Werder Bremen	2023–24	Bundesliga	25	1	1	0	—		–		26	1
Werder Bremen	2024–25	Bundesliga	26	0	3	0	—		—		29	0
Werder Bremen	2025–26	Bundesliga	30	1	1	0	—		—		31	1
Werder Bremen	2026–27	Bundesliga	8	0	2	0	—		—		10	0
Werder Bremen	Total		205	7	14	1	0	0	2	0	221	8
Career total			237	8	16	1	1	0	2	0	256	9

=== International ===
As of match played 27 September 2026

Appearances and goals by national team and year
National team	Year	Apps	Goals
Austria	2020	1	0
Austria	2021	2	0
Austria	2022	2	0
Austria	2023	0	0
Austria	2024	0	0
Austria	2025	3	0
Austria	2026	5	0
Total		13	0

== Honours ==
Bayern Munich

- DFL-Supercup: 2017
