= Oskar Wójcik =

Polish footballer (born 2003)

Personal information
- Date of birth: 21 July 2003 (age 23)
- Place of birth: Tarnów, Poland
- Height: 1.91 m (6 ft 3 in)
- Position: Centre-back

Team information
- Current team: Werder Bremen
- Number: 3

Youth career
- –2014: Rylovia Rylowa
- 2014–2017: Tarnovia Tarnów
- 2017–2019: Cracovia
- 2019: Tarnovia Tarnów
- 2019–2022: Cracovia

Senior career*
Years	Team	Apps	(Gls)
2022–2025	Cracovia II	28	(3)
2024	→ GKS Bełchatów (loan)	13	(0)
2025–2026	Cracovia	32	(0)
2026–	Werder Bremen	3	(0)

International career^{‡}
2026–	Poland	1	(0)
- * Club domestic league appearances and goals as of 17:30, 31 October 2026 (UTC) ‡ National team caps and goals as of 31 May 2026

Oskar Wójcik (born 21 July 2003) is a Polish professional footballer who plays as a centre-back for Bundesliga club Werder Bremen and the Poland national team.

== Club career ==
On 9 July 2026, Wójcik signed for Werder Bremen in Germany.

== Career statistics ==
=== Club ===
As of match played 31 October 2026

Appearances and goals by club, season and competition
Club	Season	League			National cup (Note: Includes Polish Cup)		Other		Total	
Club	Season	Division	Apps	Goals	Apps	Goals	Apps	Goals	Apps	Goals
Cracovia II	2022–23	III liga, group IV	2	0	—		—		2	0
Cracovia II	2024–25	IV liga Lesser Poland	26	3	—		—		26	3
Cracovia II	Total		28	3	—		—		28	3
GKS Bełchatów (loan)	2023–24	III liga, group I	13	0	—		—		13	0
Cracovia	2024–25	Ekstraklasa	1	0	0	0	—		1	0
Cracovia	2025–26	Ekstraklasa	31	0	2	0	—		33	0
Cracovia	Total		32	0	2	0	—		34	0
Werder Bremen	2026–27	Bundesliga	4	0	0	0	—		4	0
Career total			77	3	2	0	0	0	79	3

=== International ===
As of match played 31 May 2026

Appearances and goals by national team and year
National team	Year	Apps	Goals
Poland	2026	1	0
Total		1	0

== Honours ==
Cracovia II

- IV liga Lesser Poland: 2024–25
