= Dariusz Stalmach =

Polish footballer (born 2005)

Personal information
- Full name: Dariusz Piotr Stalmach
- Date of birth: 8 December 2005 (age 20)
- Place of birth: Tarnowskie Góry, Poland
- Height: 1.82 m (6 ft 0 in)
- Position: Midfielder

Team information
- Current team: Werder Bremen
- Number: 23

Youth career
- 2015–2016: Sparta Zabrze
- 2016–2017: Rozwój Katowice
- 2017–2018: Ruch Radzionków
- 2018–2021: Górnik Zabrze
- 2022–2024: AC Milan

Senior career*
Years	Team	Apps	(Gls)
2021–2022	Górnik Zabrze II	13	(1)
2021–2022	Górnik Zabrze	20	(0)
2024–2025	Milan Futuro	10	(1)
2025–2026	1. FC Magdeburg	24	(2)
2025	1. FC Magdeburg II	11	(1)
2026–	Werder Bremen	6	(1)

International career^{‡}
2022–2023	Poland U18	7	(1)
2023	Poland U19	3	(0)
2024–	Poland U20	5	(1)
2026–	Poland U21	1	(0)
- * Club domestic league appearances and goals as of 31 October 2026 ‡ National team caps and goals as of 21:12, 30 September 2026 (UTC)

Dariusz Piotr Stalmach (born 8 December 2005) is a Polish professional footballer who plays as a midfielder for Bundesliga club Werder Bremen. He is a Poland youth international.

== Club career ==
In September 2022, Stalmach was named as one of the best players born in 2005 worldwide by English newspaper The Guardian.

On 21 August 2022, he moved to Serie A club AC Milan, immediately joining the under-19 side.

On 17 August 2024, Stalmach made his debut for the newly created AC Milan reserve team Milan Futuro, coming on as a substitute for Mattia Sandri at the 74th minute of a 2–1 Coppa Italia Serie C round of 16 away win against Novara.

On 3 February 2025, Stalmach moved to 2. Bundesliga club 1. FC Magdeburg in Germany, on a permanent transfer.

He signed with Bundesliga side Werder Bremen on 26 June 2026, ahead of the 2026–27 season.

== Career statistics ==
As of match played 31 October 2026

Appearances and goals by club, season and competition
Club	Season	League			National cup (Note: Includes Polish Cup, Coppa Italia Serie C, DFB-Pokal)		Continental		Other		Total	
Club	Season	Division	Apps	Goals	Apps	Goals	Apps	Goals	Apps	Goals	Apps	Goals
Górnik Zabrze II	2021–22	III liga, gr. III	11	1	—		—		—		11	1
Górnik Zabrze II	2022–23	III liga, gr. III	2	0	—		—		—		2	0
Górnik Zabrze II	Total		13	1	—		—		—		13	1
Górnik Zabrze	2021–22	Ekstraklasa	17	0	2	0	—		—		19	0
Górnik Zabrze	2022–23	Ekstraklasa	3	0	0	0	—		—		3	0
Górnik Zabrze	Total		20	0	2	0	—		—		22	0
Milan Futuro	2024–25	Serie C	10	1	2	0	—		0	0	12	1
1. FC Magdeburg	2024–25	2. Bundesliga	0	0	—		—		—		0	0
1. FC Magdeburg	2025–26	2. Bundesliga	24	2	1	0	—		—		25	2
1. FC Magdeburg	Total		24	2	1	0	—		—		25	2
1. FC Magdeburg II	2024–25	NOFV-Oberliga Süd	8	1	—		—		—		8	1
1. FC Magdeburg II	2025–26	Regionalliga Nordost	3	0	—		—		—		3	0
1. FC Magdeburg II	Total		11	1	—		—		—		11	1
Werder Bremen	2026–27	Bundesliga	6	1	1	0	—		—		7	1
Career total			84	6	6	0	0	0	0	0	90	6
