= Stefan Smarkalev =

Bulgarian footballer (born 2007)

Personal information
- Full name: Stefan Stefanov Smarkalev
- Date of birth: 14 May 2007 (age 19)
- Place of birth: Sofia, Bulgaria
- Height: 1.88 m (6 ft 2 in)
- Position: Goalkeeper

Team information
- Current team: Werder Bremen
- Number: 37

Youth career
- 2014–2024: Botev Plovdiv
- 2024–: Werder Bremen

Senior career*
Years	Team	Apps	(Gls)
2022–2024	Botev Plovdiv II	42	(0)
2022–2024	Botev Plovdiv	2	(0)
2025–	Werder Bremen II	36	(0)
2025–	Werder Bremen	0	(0)

International career
2022–2023	Bulgaria U16	4	(0)
2023	Bulgaria U17	1	(0)
2025–	Bulgaria U19	1	(0)
- * Club domestic league appearances and goals as of 09:06, 18 November 2026 (UTC)

Stefan Smarkalev (Bulgarian: Стефан Смъркалев; born 14 May 2007) is a Bulgarian footballer who plays as a goalkeeper for Werder Bremen II.

== Career ==
Smarkalev began his career at Botev Plovdiv Academy at the age of 7. He signed his first professional contract with the team in January 2023. He made his professional debut for Botev in a league match against Arda Kardzhali on 6 June 2023, at the age of 16 years and 23 days. On 26 June 2024, he completed a transfer to Werder Bremen, joining their U19 team. On 11 November 2024, he helped his U19 team qualify for the quarter finals of youth cup, making an assist, scoring a penalty and saving one penalty in the added time.
