= SV Werder Bremen =

Association football club in Germany

Werder Bremen
- Full name: Sportverein Werder Bremen von 1899 e. V.
- Nicknames: Die Werderaner (The River Islanders); Die Grün-Weißen (The Green-Whites)
- Short name: Werder, Bremen
- Founded: 4 February 1899; 127 years ago
- Ground: Weserstadion
- Capacity: 42,100
- President: Hubertus Hess-Grunewald
- Head coach: Daniel Thioune
- League: Bundesliga
- 2025–26: Bundesliga, 15th of 18
- Website: werder.de
Home colours	Away colours	Third colours

Sportverein Werder Bremen von 1899 e. V. (German pronunciation: [ɛs faʊ̯ ˌvɛʁdɐ ˈbʁeːmən]), commonly known as Werder Bremen, Werder or simply Bremen, is a German professional sports club based in Bremen. Founded on 4 February 1899, Werder are best known for their professional association football team, who compete in the Bundesliga, the first tier of the German football league system. Bremen share the record for most seasons played in the Bundesliga with Bayern Munich, and are ranked third in the all-time Bundesliga table, only behind Bayern and Borussia Dortmund.

Werder have been German champions four times, have won the DFB-Pokal six times, the DFL-Ligapokal once, the DFL-Supercup thrice, and the European Cup Winners' Cup once. The team's first major trophy was the 1960–61 DFB-Pokal; they last won the cup in 2008–09. Bremen's first German championship came in 1964–65, and their latest in 2003–04, when they won the double. In European football, Werder won the 1991–92 European Cup Winners' Cup, and were runners-up in the 2008–09 UEFA Cup.

Bremen have played at the Weserstadion since 1909. The club shares a rivalry with fellow northern German club Hamburger SV, known as the Nordderby (lit. 'North derby'). In July 2026, Werder had 68,000 members.

== History ==
=== 1899–1970 ===
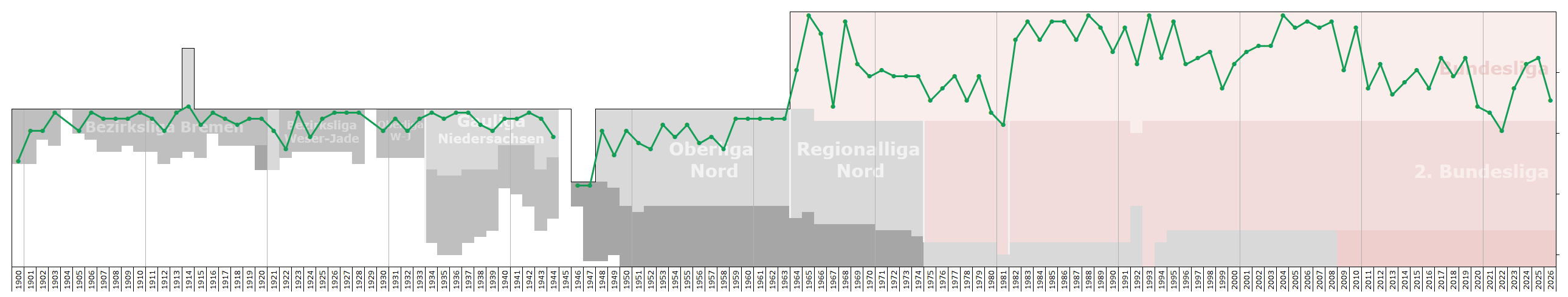
Historical chart of Werder's league performance

On 4 February 1899, FV Werder Bremen was founded by a group of 16-year-old students who had won a football in a tug of war tournament. The name "Werder" is the German word for "river peninsula", alluding to the riverside field on which the team played their first football matches. On 10 September 1899, Werder won their first match 1–0, against ASC 1898 Bremen. In 1900, the club was one of the founder members of the German Football Association (DFB). Werder then had some early success, winning several local championships. In 1903, all three of their teams won their local leagues. Due to the club's popularity, Werder became the first side in the city to charge entry fees for home matches.

After the First World War, the club adopted other sports, such as athletics, baseball, chess, cricket, and tennis. On 19 January 1920, the club took on their current name: Sportverein Werder Bremen. In 1922, it became the first club in Bremen to hire a professional coach, the Hungarian Ferenc Kónya. Werder made regular appearances in the play-offs of the Northern German football championship during the 1920s and early 1930s, but did not win any titles. In the mid-1930s, striker Matthias Heidemann became the club's first international.

Werder won the Gauliga Niedersachsen in 1933–34, and again in 1935–36, 1936–37, and 1941–42. By winning the Gauliga, the team qualified for the national championship play-offs; Bremen's best result was a quarter-final place in 1942. As professionalism was not permitted in German football, several Werder players worked at the nearby Brinkmann tobacco factory; the side were subsequently nicknamed "Texas 11" after one of the company's cigarette brands.

Between the end of the Second World War and the formation of the Bundesliga in 1963, the club was recognised as one of the top two teams in northern Germany, along with Hamburger SV. In 1960–61, Werder won their first DFB-Pokal, defeating 1. FC Kaiserslautern 2–0 in the final. The team consisted of future international Sepp Piontek, former international Willi Schröder, and Arnold Schütz, among others. A second place in the 1962–63 Oberliga Nord, behind Hamburger SV, ensured Werder's place in the 1963–64 Bundesliga, the competition's inaugural season. Werder won their first German championship in 1964–65, finishing three points ahead of 1. FC Köln. One of the team's key players was German international and defender Horst-Dieter Höttges. Werder finished runners-up in 1967–68; in the following years, they languished in the bottom half of the table.

=== 1970–2000 ===
In April 1971, during an away match at Borussia Mönchengladbach, the hosts' striker Herbert Laumen fell in Werder's goal net after a collision with Bremen goalkeeper Günter Bernard. The right goalpost snapped as a result of the impact, bringing the goal down, which could not be repaired nor replaced. The referee abandoned the game with a scoreline of 1–1; the DFB later awarded the win to Werder. As a result of signing several expensive players, Bremen were nicknamed "Millionenelf". The team's form did not improve, and in 1979–80, Werder were relegated from the Bundesliga for the first time.

The team won the 1980–81 2. Bundesliga Nord title and were promoted back to the Bundesliga. Manager Otto Rehhagel was appointed in April 1981; under his guidance, Werder were Bundesliga runners-up in 1982–83, 1984–85 and 1985–86. In 1983 and 1986, the side lost the title on goal difference. During the latter season, Werder hosted Bayern Munich in the penultimate match; Bremen needed to win to secure the title. In the last minutes of the game, Werder were awarded a penalty kick, which Michael Kutzop missed; the match ended goalless. Bayern won their last match, but Werder lost 2–1 to VfB Stuttgart, meaning that Bayern won the title. Werder won their second Bundesliga title two years later, in 1987–88, only conceding a then-record 22 goals. They also reached the semi-final of that year's UEFA Cup. In the third round of the 1989–90 UEFA Cup, Bremen defeated defending champions Napoli 8–3 on aggregate, after winning 5–1 at home (Diego Maradona was one of the Napoli players).

Werder reached the DFB-Pokal final in 1989 and 1990, and were victorious in 1991. They also won the European Cup Winners' Cup in 1991–92, beating AS Monaco 2–0 in the final. In 1992–93, the team won their third Bundesliga title, and won their third DFB-Pokal in 1994. Bremen became the first German club to reach the group stage of the newly rebranded UEFA Champions League in 1993–94. During that season, Werder trailed Belgian club Anderlecht 3–0 after 66 minutes. The side turned the game around and won 5–3; it is hailed as an example of the "Wunder von der Weser" (English: "Wonder of the Weser"). In this period, Werder had numerous internationals, including Mario Basler, Marco Bode, Rune Bratseth, Andreas Herzog, Karl-Heinz Riedle, Wynton Rufer, and Rudi Völler.

Bremen finished runners-up in the 1994–95 Bundesliga; at the end of the season, after a then-national record 14-year stint at Werder, Rehhagel left the club for Bayern Munich. Rehhagel, Bremen's most successful manager, had employed a "controlled offensive" style of play, and worked on a tight budget during his reign. His successors (Aad de Mos, Dixie Dörner, Wolfgang Sidka, and Felix Magath) did not win any major honours. In May 1999, former Werder defender, and youth coach Thomas Schaaf took over. He kept the team in the Bundesliga, and won the DFB-Pokal only weeks later, defeating Bayern on penalties.

=== 2000–present ===
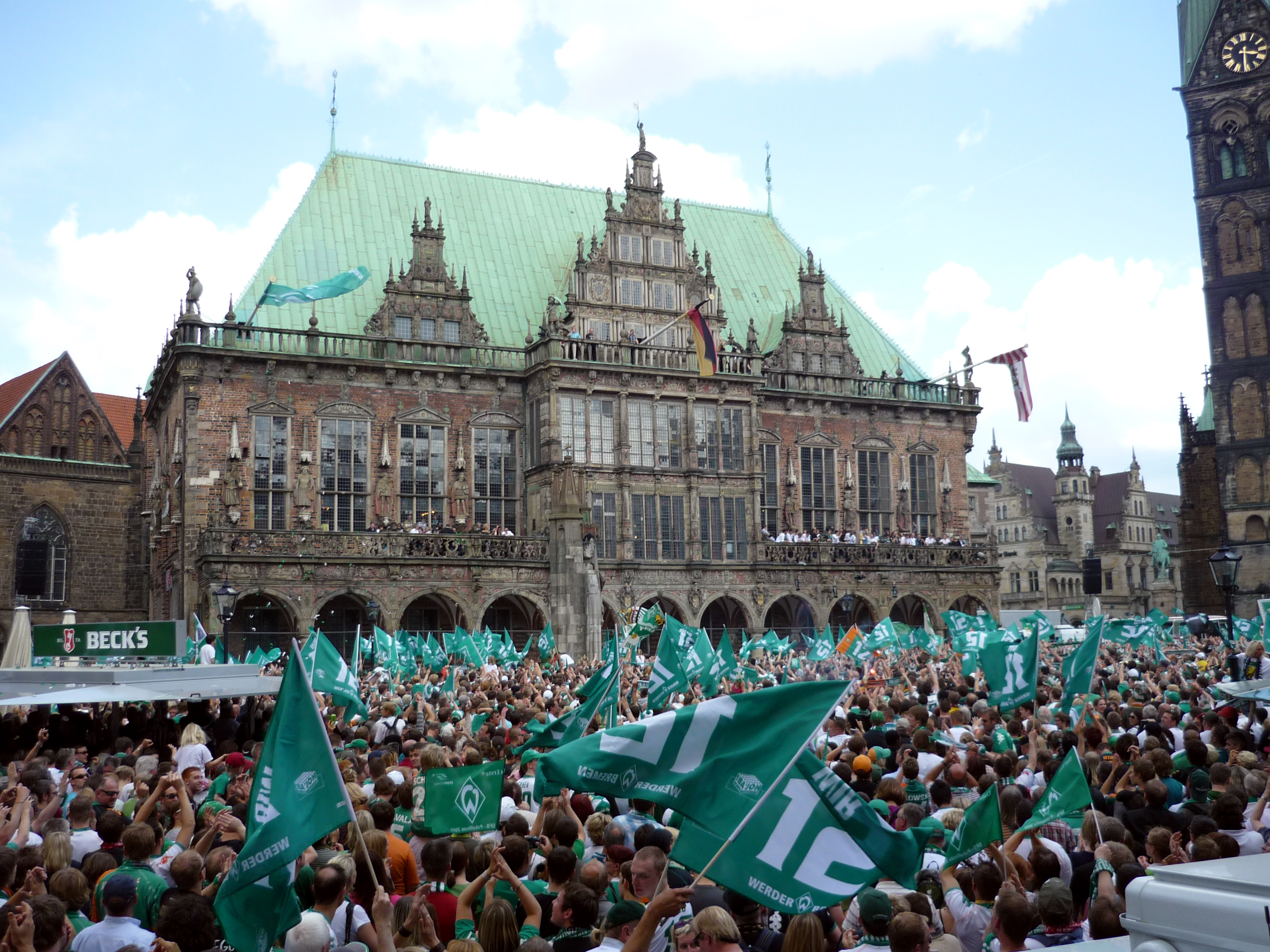
Werder fans celebrating the team's 2008–09 DFB-Pokal triumph at the Bremen City Hall

Werder's league performance stabilized during the following seasons, regularly finishing in the upper half of the table. In 2003–04, Bremen won both the Bundesliga and the DFB-Pokal, claiming the double for the first time, becoming the third club in Bundesliga history to achieve this feat. The team also regularly qualified for the Champions League during the 2000s. In the last match of the 2005–06 Bundesliga season, Werder won 2–1 at arch-rivals Hamburger SV to qualify for the Champions League, instead of Hamburg. Bremen reached the semi-finals of the 2006–07 UEFA Cup, in which they were eliminated by Spanish club RCD Espanyol. In 2008–09, the team reached the UEFA Cup final—losing 2–1 against Ukrainian side Shakhtar Donetsk after extra time—and the DFB-Pokal final, defeating Bayer Leverkusen by a scoreline of 1–0. In April and May 2009, Werder had played Hamburg four times in 19 days; once in the Bundesliga, twice in the semi-final of the UEFA Cup, and in the semi-final of the DFB-Pokal. Bremen defeated Hamburg 2–0 in the Bundesliga, and eliminated them from the DFB-Pokal and the UEFA Cup.

During this period, Werder had several players who were sold for large transfer fees, including Diego, Torsten Frings, Miroslav Klose, Mesut Özil, and Claudio Pizarro. In October 2010, Pizarro became the then-record foreign goalscorer in Bundesliga history. In 2013, Schaaf left the club by mutual consent after a 14th-place finish in the Bundesliga. In 2019–20, Bremen beat Köln 6–1 on the last matchday to finish in 16th place, overtaking Fortuna Düsseldorf; however, Bremen had to play the promotion-relegation play-offs against 1. FC Heidenheim to avoid relegation. The tie ended 2–2 on aggregate, with Werder winning on the away goals rule, and avoiding relegation. Bremen finished 17th the following season, and were relegated to the 2. Bundesliga for the first time since 1979–80. The team finished runners-up in the 2021–22 2. Bundesliga and won promotion back to the Bundesliga after one season.

== Players ==
=== Current squad ===
As of 1 October 2026

Note: Flags indicate national team as defined under FIFA eligibility rules; some limited exceptions apply. Players may hold more than one non-FIFA nationality.

No.	Pos.	Nation	Player
1	GK	EST	Karl Hein
2	DF	BEL	Olivier Deman
3	DF	POL	Oskar Wójcik
4	DF	GER	Niklas Stark
5	DF	GER	Amos Pieper
6	MF	DEN	Jens Stage
8	DF	GER	Mitchell Weiser
9	FW	GER	Keke Topp
10	FW	GER	Niclas Füllkrug (on loan from West Ham United)
11	FW	GER	Justin Njinmah
13	DF	BRA	Arthur (on loan from Bayer Leverkusen)
14	MF	BEL	Senne Lynen
15	MF	SVK	Ludovit Reis
16	DF	SEN	Moussa N'Diaye (on loan from Anderlecht)
17	FW	AUT	Marco Grüll
18	MF	TUR	Eren Dinkçi (on loan from Freiburg)
19	FW	HAI	Kenny Quetant

No.	Pos.	Nation	Player
20	MF	ESP	Chuki
23	MF	POL	Dariusz Stalmach
25	GK	GER	Markus Kolke
26	FW	SUI	Cedric Itten
27	DF	NGR	Felix Agu
28	MF	FRA	Skelly Alvero
29	FW	GER	Salim Musah
30	GK	AUT	Alexander Schlager
32	DF	AUT	Marco Friedl (captain)
33	DF	GER	Mick Schmetgens
34	MF	TUR	Darwin Soylu
35	DF	GER	Luca Höcker
36	DF	GER	Mats Heitmann
37	GK	BUL	Stefan Smarkalev
38	FW	GER	Paul Erevbenagie
44	MF	NED	Youri Regeer (on loan from Ajax)

=== Out on loan ===
Note: Flags indicate national team as defined under FIFA eligibility rules; some limited exceptions apply. Players may hold more than one non-FIFA nationality.

No.	Pos.	Nation	Player
—	DF	ARG	Julián Malatini (at FC Cincinnati until 30 June 2027)
—	MF	GER	Wesley Adeh (at Preußen Münster until 30 June 2027)
—	MF	CRO	Patrice Čović (at Dynamo Dresden until 30 June 2027)

No.	Pos.	Nation	Player
—	MF	BEL	Samuel Mbangula (at Bologna until 30 June 2027)
—	MF	GER	Leon Opitz (at VfL Osnabrück until 30 June 2027)

=== Notable players ===
- A list of notable Werder Bremen players can be found here. For a list of all past and present players who are the subjects of Wikipedia articles, see Category:SV Werder Bremen players.

=== Retired numbers ===
- 12 – "The twelfth man", dedication to the club's supporters

== Managers ==
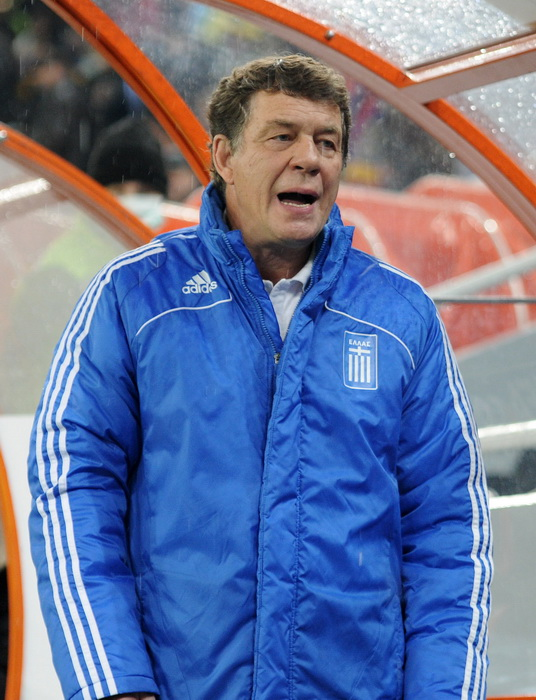
Otto Rehhagel (2009 photograph) is the club's longest-serving manager.

Werder have had 24 different managers since the beginning of the Bundesliga era in 1963. Otto Rehhagel served the longest term, holding the post for fourteen years. Hans Tilkowski, Willi Multhaup, Rudi Assauer, and Otto Rehhagel served two terms each, while Fritz Langner served three.

Name	Date	Notes
(Germany) Willi Multhaup	1 July 1963 – 30 June 1965	
(Germany) Günter Brocker	1 July 1965 – 4 September 1967	
(Germany) Fritz Langner	9 September 1967 – 30 June 1969	
(Germany) Richard Ackerschott	2 March 1968 –19 October 1968	Replacement for Fritz Langner in four Bundesliga matches
(Germany) Fritz Rebell	1 July 1969 – 16 March 1970	
(Germany) Hans Tilkowski	17 March 1970 – 30 June 1970	
(Germany) Robert Gebhardt	1 July 1970 – 28 September 1971	
(Germany) Willi Multhaup	28 September 1971 – 24 October 1971	
(Germany) Sepp Piontek	25 October 1971 – 30 June 1975	
(Germany) Fritz Langner	8 May 1972 – 30 June 1972	Replacement for Sepp Piontek in two Bundesliga matches
(Germany) Herbert Burdenski	1 July 1975 – 28 February 1976	
(Germany) Otto Rehhagel	29 February 1976 – 30 June 1976	
(Germany) Hans Tilkowski	1 July 1976 – 19 December 1977	
(Germany) Rudi Assauer	20 December 1977 – 31 December 1977	
(Germany) Fred Schulz	1 January 1978 – 30 June 1978	
(Germany) Wolfgang Weber	1 July 1978 – 28 January 1980	
(Germany) Rudi Assauer	29 January 1980 – 20 February 1980	
(Germany) Fritz Langner	21 February 1980 – 30 June 1980	
(Germany) Kuno Klötzer	1 July 1980 – 1 April 1981	
(Germany) Otto Rehhagel	2 April 1981 – 30 June 1995	
(Netherlands) Aad de Mos	1 July 1995 – 9 January 1996	
(Germany) Hans-Jürgen Dörner	14 January 1996 – 20 August 1997	
(Germany) Wolfgang Sidka	21 August 1997 – 20 October 1998	
(Germany) Felix Magath	22 October 1998 – 8 May 1999	
(Germany) Thomas Schaaf	9 May 1999 – 15 May 2013	
(Germany) Wolfgang Rolff	15 May 2013 – 25 May 2013	Caretaker manager for one Bundesliga match
(Germany) Robin Dutt	1 June 2013 – 25 October 2014	
(Ukraine) Viktor Skrypnyk	25 October 2014 – 18 September 2016	
(Germany) Alexander Nouri	18 September 2016 – 30 October 2017	
(Germany) Florian Kohfeldt	30 October 2017 – 16 May 2021	
(Germany) Thomas Schaaf	16 May 2021 – 30 June 2021	Caretaker manager for one Bundesliga match
(Germany) Markus Anfang	1 July 2021 – 20 November 2021	
(Austria) Danijel Zenković	20 November 2021 – 28 November 2021	Caretaker manager for one match
(Germany) Ole Werner	28 November 2021 – 27 May 2025	
(Germany) Horst Steffen	1 July 2025 – 1 February 2026	
(Germany) Daniel Thioune	4 February 2026 –	

== Coaching staff ==
Position	Staff
Head coach	(Germany) Daniel Thioune
Assistant coach	(Germany) Jan Hoepner (Germany) Christian Groß
Goalkeeper coach	(Germany) Christian Vander
Head of match operations & team management	(Germany) Tim Barten
Team management	(Germany) Dustin Haloschan
Athletics coach	(Austria) Günther Stoxreiter (Germany) Henrik Frach
Mental coach	(Germany) Axel Zehle
Team doctor	(Germany) Dr. Philip Heitmann (Germany) Robert Gorzolla (Germany) Dr. Christoph Engelke (Germany) Dr. Simon Diestelmeier
Physiotherapist	(Germany) Claas Bente (Germany) Johannes Haberlandt (Germany) Florian Lauerer (Germany) Adis Lović (Germany) Laura Kersting
Chief analyst	(Germany) Sören Quittkat
Game analyst	(Germany) Philipp Pelka (Germany) Jonas Rudolph
Coordinator kit, equipment & logistics	(Germany) Julian Webendörfer

== Colours and crest ==
=== Colours ===
Werder Bremen's club colours are green and white, as referenced by the club song, "Lebenslang Grün-Weiß". The club's home shirts have often varied between green and white, though a predominantly white home shirt has not been used since 2008–09. There have been some exceptions to their traditional kit colours, such as from 1971 to 1973, when they adopted the city's colours of red and white, and in 1976, when they wore blue due to shirt sponsors Norda.

=== Crest ===
Werder Bremen have used several crests during their history. Their first badge was created in 1899; a monogram, which spelled "FVW", as the club was then known as "FV Werder Bremen". The logo was replaced in 1902 by a green-coloured crest, which spelled the founding year 1899 in the top left corner, "F.V.W." diagonally in the middle, and "Bremen" in the bottom right corner. In 1911, the inscriptions were placed diagonally, and the badge's colours were changed to black with a green diagonal stripe, along with a change in the crest's outline. In 1924, a green-coloured (with a white outline), oval-shaped crest with a large white-coloured "W" was created. The oval shape was replaced with a diamond one in 1929, to form the club's current crest, save for a spell in the 1970s when the coat of arms of Bremen was used. In addition, a star is displayed above the crest on the team's shirts to represent their four Bundesliga titles.

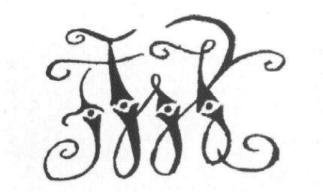
1899–1902

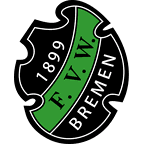
1911–1924

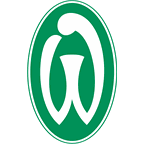
1924–1929

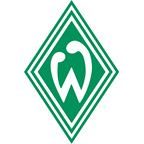
1929–1976

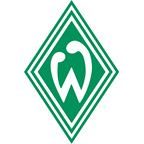
1977–1981

Since 1981 onwards

== Stadium ==
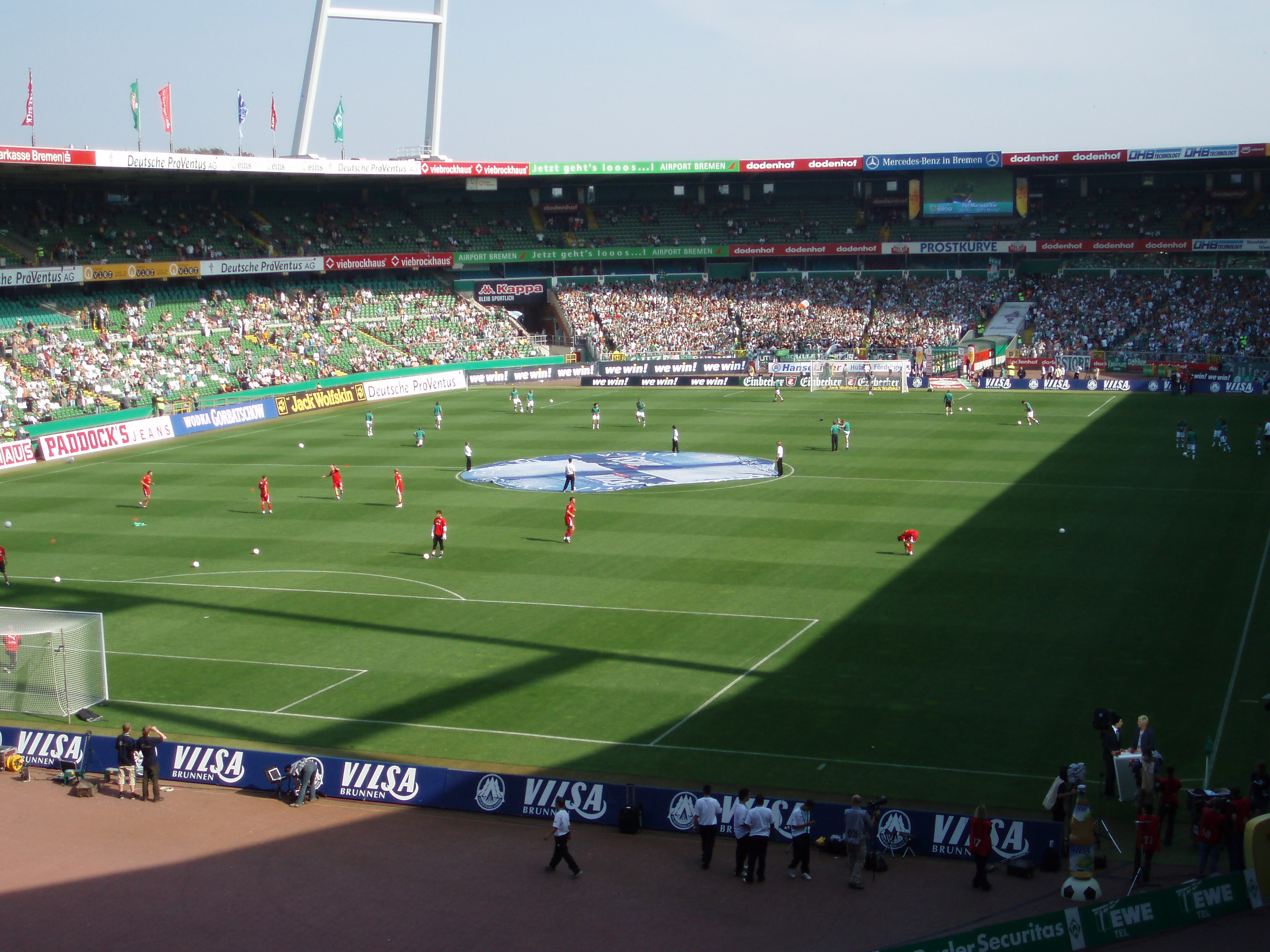
The Weserstadion photographed in 2006

Werder have played their home games at the same location since 1909. That year saw the construction of a sports venue with a wooden grandstand, built by the Allgemeinen Bremer Turn- und Sportverein. In 1926, a new grandstand with dressing rooms and a restaurant were constructed, costing 1,250,000 RM. The venue was known as the "ATSB-Kampfbahn", and was also used for political mass gatherings. In 1930, it was called the "Weserstadion" for the first time. Five years later, the stadium was known as the "Bremer Kampfbahn", and in the following years, it was mostly used by the Nazi Party, as sporting activities were rarely practiced. Shortly after the Second World War, only American sports such as baseball and American football were played at the venue (now known as the "IKE-Stadium"). In 1947, the stadium was reopened as a shared sports venue, and was renamed "Weserstadion".

Following Werder's first Bundesliga title in 1965, the corner stands were expanded with a second tier. In 1992, Bremen became the first German club to install skyboxes. In 2002, the cinder track was partially removed, thereby expanding the capacity. The Weserstadion was renovated from 2008 until 2011; the façade was coated with photovoltaic panels, and a new roof was built on top of the old roof supporting structure. Both ends (east and west) were torn down and rebuilt parallel to the endline of the pitch, removing what was left of the old athletics track. The current capacity is 42,100.

== Supporters and rivals ==
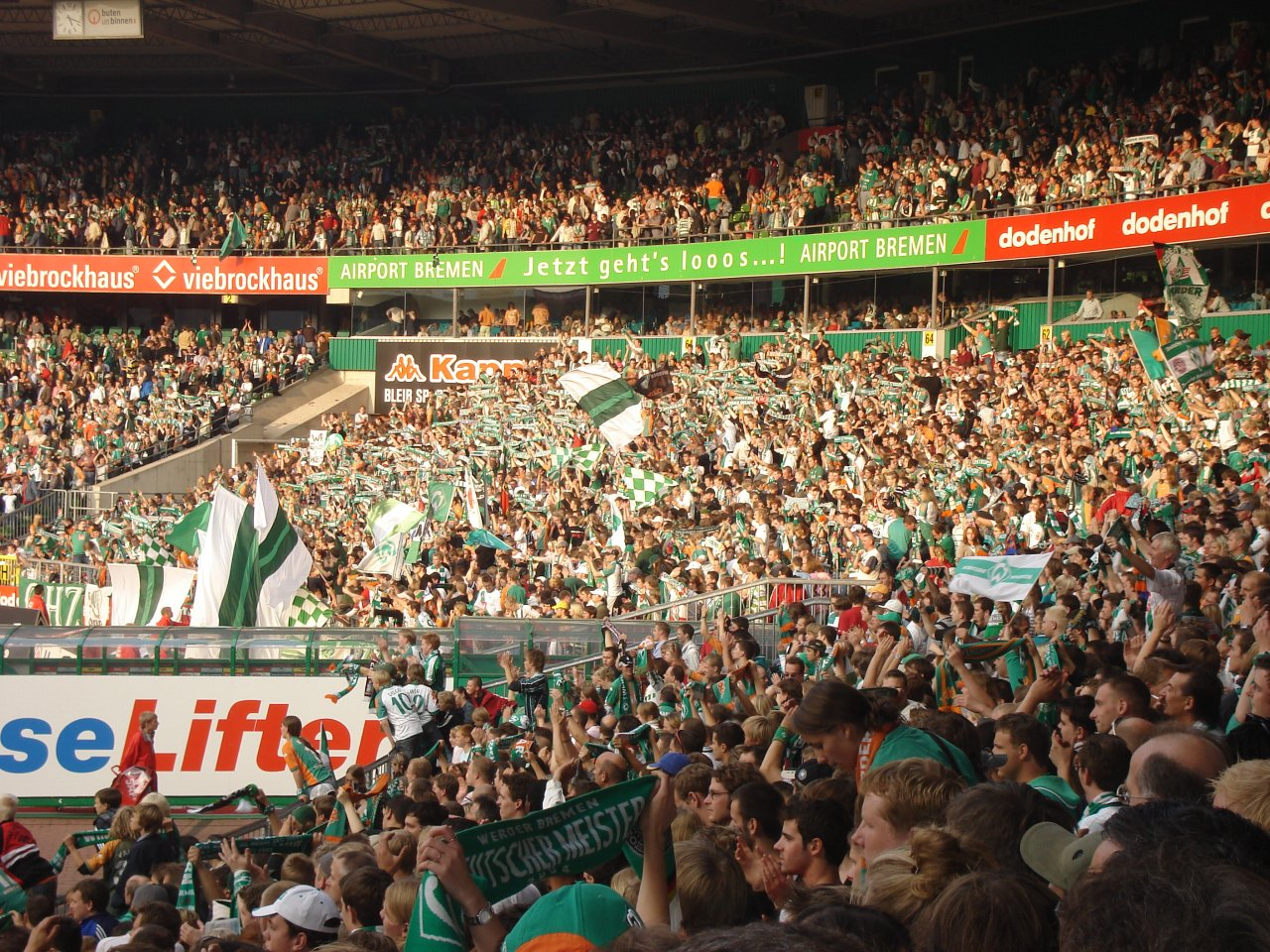
Werder fans at a home match in 2006

Bremen have a long-standing rivalry with fellow northern German club Hamburger SV, known as the Nordderby (English: "North derby"). It goes beyond football, as there also is a historic rivalry between the cities of Hamburg and Bremen, dating back to the Middle Ages. The cities are separated by one hundred kilometers, and are the two biggest metropolises in northern Germany. Bayern Munich are another rival, dating back to the 1980s, when both sides were competing for domestic honours. Since the mid-2000s, Bremen fans have developed a dislike of Schalke 04, after they poached several Werder players over the years, including Aílton, Fabian Ernst, Mladen Krstajić, Oliver Reck, Frank Rost, and Franco Di Santo.

Bremen have seven ultra groups: "Wanderers-Bremen", "The Infamous Youth", "Caillera", "L'Intesa Verde", "HB Crew", "Ultra Boys", and "UltrA-Team Bremen". Werder fans maintain friendly relationships with FC St. Pauli, Cosenza, Austrian club SK Sturm Graz, and Israeli clubs Maccabi Haifa, and Hapoel Jerusalem.

The anthem of Werder Bremen is "Lebenslang Grün-Weiß" by Bremen-based band Original Deutschmacher, which is also sung before every home game. After each Bremen goal, the song "I'm Gonna Be (500 Miles)" by The Proclaimers is played, preceded by the sound of a ship's horn.

== Honours ==
Werder's honours include the following:

=== Domestic ===
- Bundesliga
  - Winners: 1964–65, 1987–88, 1992–93, 2003–04
  - Runners-up: 1967–68, 1982–83, 1984–85, 1985–86, 1994–95, 2005–06, 2007–08
- 2. Bundesliga
  - Winners: 1980–81
  - Runners-up: 2021–22
- DFB-Pokal
  - Winners: 1960–61, 1990–91, 1993–94, 1998–99, 2003–04, 2008–09
  - Runners-up: 1988–89, 1989–90, 1999–2000, 2009–10
- DFL-Ligapokal
  - Winners: 2006
  - Runners-up: 1999, 2004
- DFL-Supercup
  - Winners: 1988, 1993, 1994, 2009 (unofficial)
  - Runners-up: 1991
- DFB-Hallenpokal
  - Winners: 1989
  - Runners-up: 1991, 2001

==== Regional ====
- Gauliga Niedersachsen
  - Winners: 1933–34, 1935–36, 1936–37, 1941–42
  - Runners-up: 1934–35

=== International ===
- European Cup Winners' Cup
  - Winners: 1991–92
- UEFA Cup
  - Runners-up: 2008–09
- European Super Cup
  - Runners-up: 1992
- UEFA Intertoto Cup
  - Winners: 1998
- Kirin Cup
  - Winners: 1982, 1986

=== Double ===
- 2003–04: Bundesliga and DFB-Pokal

== European performance ==
Werder Bremen participated on numerous occasions in European football competitions organised by UEFA. The side won the 1991–92 European Cup Winners' Cup, were runners-up in the 1992 European Super Cup, and finalists in the 2008–09 UEFA Cup. Werder were also joint winners of the 1998 UEFA Intertoto Cup.

== See also ==
- SV Werder Bremen (women) – women's only football club, affiliated with Werder Bremen
- The Football Club Social Alliance
