= 2020–21 SV Wehen Wiesbaden season =

SV Wehen Wiesbaden
2020–21 season
- Manager: Rüdiger Rehm
- Stadium: Brita-Arena
- 3. Liga: 6th
- DFB-Pokal: Second round

The 2020–21 SV Wehen Wiesbaden season was the 95th season in SV Wehen Wiesbaden's football history. In 2020–21 the club played in the 3. Liga, the third tier of German football, alongside the DFB-Pokal and the Hesse Cup.

== Team ==
As of 3 September 2026

Note: Flags indicate national team as defined under FIFA eligibility rules; some limited exceptions apply. Players may hold more than one non-FIFA nationality.

No.	Pos.	Nation	Player
5	DF	GER	Niklas May
6	MF	GER	Gino Fechner
7	MF	GER	Lukas Schleimer
8	MF	GER	Donny Bogićević
9	FW	GER	Simon Stehle
10	FW	GER	Robin Kalem
11	MF	TUR	Tarik Gözüsirin
14	DF	GER	Michael Schultz
15	DF	GER	Justin Janitzek
16	GK	GER	Florian Stritzel
17	DF	GER	Ben Nink
18	MF	GER	Fabian Greilinger
19	DF	GER	Florian Hübner (captain)
20	MF	MAR	Ayoub Chaikhoun (on loan from 1. FC Nürnberg)

No.	Pos.	Nation	Player
21	FW	GER	Marcus Müller (on loan from Holstein Kiel)
22	FW	GER	Roberto Massimo (on loan from Górnik Zabrze)
24	DF	GER	Tim Neubert
27	DF	BEL	Jordy Gillekens
28	MF	GER	Moritz Flotho
29	DF	GER	Philipp Hercher
30	MF	GER	Sinan Karweina
31	GK	GER	Noah Brdar
32	MF	GER	Raul Paula
37	MF	GER	Max Brandt
41	GK	GER	Finn Ludwig
45	MF	MAR	Ibrahim Ati Allah
47	MF	ESP	David Suárez

== Transfers ==
=== In ===
Date	Pos.	Name	From	Type	Ref.
21 July	DF	(Germany) Florian Carstens	FC St. Pauli	Loan	
23 July	MF	(Germany) Gianluca Korte	SV Waldhof Mannheim	Transfer	
27 July	GK	(Germany) Tim Boss	Dynamo Dresden	Transfer	
11 August	MF	(Germany) Marc Lais	SSV Jahn Regensburg	Transfer	
15 August	FW	(Germany) Maurice Malone	FC Augsburg	Loan	
18 August	FW	(Germany) Johannes Wurtz	SV Darmstadt 98	Transfer	
24 August	GK	(Germany) Matthias Hamrol	FC Emmen	Transfer	
25 August	DF	(Germany) Dennis Kempe	Erzgebirge Aue	Transfer	
10 September	FW	(Germany) Benedict Hollerbach	VfB Stuttgart Under-19	Transfer	

=== Out ===
Date	Pos.	Name	To	Type	Ref.
1 July	MF	(Germany) Maximilian Dittgen	FC St. Pauli	Transfer	
1 July	GK	(Austria) Heinz Lindner	FC Basel	Transfer	
1 July	DF	(Germany) Tobias Mißner	1. FSV Mainz 05 II	Transfer	
1 July	FW	(Germany) Cedric Euschen	Fortuna Düsseldorf II	Transfer	
1 July	MF	(Germany) Jules Schwadorf	Preußen Münster	Transfer	
1 July	MF	(Germany) Marcel Titsch-Rivero	Hallescher FC	Transfer	
1 July	MF	(Germany) Sidney Friede	FC DAC 1904 Dunajská Streda	Transfer	
1 July	MF	(Germany) Jeremias Lorch	Viktoria Köln	Transfer	
1 July	MF	(Germany) Jan Vogel	SG Barockstadt	Transfer	
1 July	MF	(Germany) Nicklas Shipnoski	1. FC Saarbrücken	Transfer	
1 July	FW	(Ghana) Daniel-Kofi Kyereh	FC St. Pauli	Transfer	
1 July	GK	(Germany) Jan Albrecht	unknown	End of contract	
1 July	MF	(Germany) Giona Leibold	unknown	End of contract	
1 July	DF	(Germany) Marc Wachs	unknown	End of contract	
1 July	MF	(Germany) Patrick Schönfeld	unknown	End of contract	
1 July	MF	(Germany) Gökhan Gül	Fortuna Düsseldorf	End of loan	
1 July	GK	(Germany) Jan-Christoph Bartels	1. FC Köln	End of loan	
1 July	DF	(Germany) Dominik Franke	VfL Wolfsburg II	End of loan	
1 July	FW	(Germany) Törles Knöll	1. FC Nürnberg	End of loan	
10 August	DF	(Germany) Niklas Dams	Borussia Dortmund II	Transfer	
15 August	FW	(Germany) Manuel Schäffler	1. FC Nürnberg	Transfer	
19 August	GK	(Germany) Lukas Watkowiak	FC St. Gallen	Transfer	

=== New contracts ===
Date	Pos.	Name	Contract length	Contract end	Ref.
12 July	FW	Stefan Aigner	1-year	2021	

== Friendlies ==
13 August 2020 1	TSG Hoffenheim	7–1	SV Wehen Wiesbaden	Zuzenhausen
15:30	Kramarić 8', 16'; Baumgartner 66', 69'; Gaćinović 82'; Skov 85'; Bebou 90+2'	Report	Schwede 90+7'	Stadium: Sportgelände FC Zuzenhausen; Attendance: 0 Referee: Asmir Osmanagić
Note: The match was played behind closed doors.

22 August 2020 2	SV Wehen Wiesbaden	2–1	SV Darmstadt 98	Wiesbaden
15:00	Wurtz 30'; Niemeyer 61'	Report	Platte 13'	Stadium: Brita-Arena; Attendance: 0 Referee: Christoffer Reimund
Note: The match was played behind closed doors.

26 August 2020 3	SV Wehen Wiesbaden	1–0	TSV Schott Mainz	Taunusstein
18:30	Tietz 62'	Report		Stadium: RP1 Taunusstein-Wehen; Attendance: 0 Referee: Cristian Ballweg
Note: The match was played behind closed doors.

1 September 2020 4	SV Wehen Wiesbaden	1–0	1. FC Kaiserslautern	Taunusstein
19:00	Malone 78'	Report		Stadium: RP1 Taunusstein-Wehen; Attendance: 0
Note: The match was played behind closed doors.

4 September 2020 5	SV Sandhausen	Cancelled	SV Wehen Wiesbaden	Sandhausen
17:00				Stadium: Hardtwaldstadion
Note: The game was cancelled, as SV Wehen Wiesbaden was in quarantine due to 2 COVID-19 cases in the team's surroundings.

== Competitions ==
Times from 1 July to 25 October 2020 and from 28 March to 30 June 2021 are UTC+2, from 26 October 2020 to 27 March 2021 UTC+1.

=== Overview ===
Competition	First match	Last match	Starting round	Final position	Record							
Competition	First match	Last match	Starting round	Final position	Pld	W	D	L	GF	GA	GD	Win %
3. Liga	19 September 2020	22 May 2021	Matchday 1		17	7	5	5	30	27	+3	41.18
DFB-Pokal	13 September 2020	23 December 2020	Round 1	Round 2	2	1	1	0	1	0	+1	50.00
Hesse Cup	10 November 2020		Round of 16		0	0	0	0	0	0	+0	—
Total					19	8	6	5	31	27	+4	42.11

Last updated: 23 December 2020
Source: Soccerway

=== 3. Liga ===
==== League table ====
Pos	Team	Pld	W	D	L	GF	GA	GD	Pts	Qualification or relegation
4	1860 Munich	38	18	12	8	69	35	+34	66	Qualification for DFB-Pokal
5	1. FC Saarbrücken	38	16	11	11	66	51	+15	59	
6	Wehen Wiesbaden	38	15	11	12	57	53	+4	56	
7	SC Verl	38	14	13	11	66	55	+11	55	
8	Waldhof Mannheim	38	13	13	12	50	55	−5	52	

Source: DFB
Rules for classification: 1) Points; 2) Goal difference; 3) Goals scored; 4) Head-to-head results; 5) Head-to-head away goals scored; 6) Away goals scored; 7) Play-off.

==== Results summary ====
Overall								Home						Away					
Pld	W	D	L	GF	GA	GD	Pts	W	D	L	GF	GA	GD	W	D	L	GF	GA	GD
37	15	11	11	57	52	+5	56	8	6	4	29	24	+5	7	5	7	28	28	0

Last updated: 17 May 2021.
Source: DFB

==== Result round by round ====
Round	1	2	3	4	5	6	7	8	9	10	11	12	13	14	15	16	17	18	19	20	21	22	23	24	25	26	27	28	29	30	31	32	33	34	35	36	37	38
Ground	H	A	H	A	H	A	A	H	A	H	A	H	A	H	A	H	A	H	A	A	H	A	H	A	H	H	A	H	A	H	A	H	A	H	A	H	A	H
Result	D	W	D	D	L	W	W	L	L	W	D	W	L	W	L	W	D	D	L	D	D	W	W	W	W	W	L	L	L	D	W	W	D	L	W	D	L	
Position	13	6	7	10	12	9	7	9	10	8	9	5	8	6	7	5	6	7	7	9	10	8	5	5	4	4	5	7	7	7	6	5	6	6	6	6	6	

First match(es) will be played on 18 September 2020. Source: DFB
A = Away; H = Home; W = Win; D = Draw; L = Loss

==== Matches ====
19 September 2020 1	SV Wehen Wiesbaden	0–0	SC Verl	Wiesbaden
14:00		Report		Stadium: Brita-Arena; Attendance: 630; Referee: Patrick Kessel

26 September 2020 2	Viktoria Köln	0–2	SV Wehen Wiesbaden	Cologne
14:00		Report	Wurtz 40', 63'	Stadium: Sportpark Höhenberg; Attendance: 1,023; Referee: Tobias Schultes

5 October 2020 3	SV Wehen Wiesbaden	2–2	1. FC Kaiserslautern	Wiesbaden
19:00	Chato 9'; Tietz 34' (pen.)	Report	Bachmann 79'; Ciftci 90+4'	Stadium: Brita-Arena; Attendance: 1,390; Referee: Matthias Jöllenbeck

10 October 2020 4	Türkgücü München	0–0	SV Wehen Wiesbaden	Munich
14:00		Report		Stadium: Olympiastadion; Attendance: 0 Referee: Alexander Sather

17 October 2020 5	SV Wehen Wiesbaden	0–1	SV Waldhof Mannheim	Wiesbaden
14:00		Report	Boyamba 2'	Stadium: Brita-Arena; Attendance: 0 Referee: Mitja Stegemann

20 October 2020 6	KFC Uerdingen	0–4	SV Wehen Wiesbaden	Düsseldorf
19:00		Report	Wurtz 12', 30'; Malone 38'; Korte 63'	Stadium: Merkur Spiel-Arena; Attendance: 0 Referee: Michael Bacher

24 October 2020 7	1. FC Magdeburg	1–2	SV Wehen Wiesbaden	Magdeburg
14:00	Burger 50'	Report	Chato 63'; Malone 74'	Stadium: MDCC-Arena; Attendance: 3,600; Referee: Florian Lechner

1 November 2020 8	SV Wehen Wiesbaden	2–4	Bayern Munich II	Wiesbaden
13:00	Korte 9'; Medić 39'	Report	Kern 33'; Dajaku 43', 49'; Vita 82'	Stadium: Brita-Arena; Attendance: 50; Referee: Konrad Oldhafer

6 November 2020 9	FC Ingolstadt	4–1	SV Wehen Wiesbaden	Ingolstadt
19:00	Kutschke 13'; Gaus 17'; Stendera 33'; Paulsen 75'	Report	Tietz 23'	Stadium: Audi Sportpark; Attendance: 0 Referee: Thorben Siewer

14 November 2020 10	SV Wehen Wiesbaden	3–1	FSV Zwickau	Wiesbaden
14:00	Korte 7'; Chato 15'; Tietz 83'	Report	Willms 16'	Stadium: Brita-Arena; Attendance: 0 Referee: Robin Braun

21 November 2020 11	1. FC Saarbrücken	3–3	SV Wehen Wiesbaden	Saarbrücken
14:00	Jacob 13', 73'; Shipnoski 23'	Report	Malone 17', 25', 54'	Stadium: Ludwigsparkstadion; Attendance: 0 Referee: Martin Speckner

24 November 2020 12	SV Wehen Wiesbaden	1–0	SV Meppen	Wiesbaden
19:00	Korte 71'	Report		Stadium: Brita-Arena; Attendance: 0 Referee: Michael Bacher

28 November 2020 13	SpVgg Unterhaching	2–1	SV Wehen Wiesbaden	Unterhaching
14:00	Stroh-Engel 20'; Marseiler 54'	Report	Malone 2'	Stadium: Sportpark Unterhaching; Attendance: 0 Referee: Asmir Osmanagic

6 December 2020 14	SV Wehen Wiesbaden	2–1	Hansa Rostock	Wiesbaden
13:00	Hollerbach 35', 49'	Report	Verhoek 68'	Stadium: Brita-Arena; Attendance: 0 Referee: Nicolas Winter

12 December 2020 15	MSV Duisburg	4–1	SV Wehen Wiesbaden	Duisburg
14:00	Vermeij 19', 47', 74'; Engin 77'	Report	Guthörl 84'	Stadium: MSV-Arena; Attendance: 0 Referee: Patrick Kessel

15 December 2020 16	SV Wehen Wiesbaden	4–2	VfB Lübeck	Wiesbaden
19:00	Kempe 45+1'; Prokop 68'; Tietz 70' (pen.); Medić 89'	Report	Zehir 23' (pen.); Deters 39'	Stadium: Brita-Arena; Attendance: 0 Referee: Franz Bokop

18 December 2020 17	1860 Munich	2–2	SV Wehen Wiesbaden	Munich
19:00	Mölders 74'; Knöferl 83'	Report	Gürleyen 17'; Prokop 52'	Stadium: Grünwalder Stadion; Attendance: 0 Referee: Lars Erbst

9 January 2021 18	SV Wehen Wiesbaden	1–1	Hallescher FC	Wiesbaden
14:00	Malone 89'	Report	Derstroff 44'	Stadium: Brita-Arena; Attendance: 0 Referee: Lukas Benen

17 March 2021 19	Dynamo Dresden	1–0	SV Wehen Wiesbaden	Dresden
19:00	Sohm 12'	Report		Stadium: Rudolf-Harbig-Stadion; Attendance: 0 Referee: Steven Greif

23 January 2021 20	SC Verl	2–2	SV Wehen Wiesbaden	Paderborn
14:00	Yildirim 20'; Schikowski 65'	Report	Medić 59'; Tietz 77'	Stadium: Benteler-Arena; Attendance: 0 Referee: Patrick Schwengers

26 January 2021 21	SV Wehen Wiesbaden	2–2	Viktoria Köln	Wiesbaden
19:00	Tietz 63'; Malone 87'	Report	Lorch 21'; Cueto 81'	Stadium: Brita-Arena; Attendance: 0 Referee: Alexander Sather

30 January 2021 22	1. FC Kaiserslautern	0–1	SV Wehen Wiesbaden	Kaiserslautern
14:00		Report	Lankford 68'	Stadium: Fritz-Walter-Stadion; Attendance: 0 Referee: Florian Exner

7 February 2021 23	SV Wehen Wiesbaden	3–1	Türkgücü München	Wiesbaden
14:00	Tietz 45+1'; Kuhn 87'; Nilsson 90+3'	Report	Sararer 82' (pen.)	Stadium: Brita-Arena; Attendance: 0 Referee: Lars Erbst

13 February 2021 24	SV Waldhof Mannheim	0–1	SV Wehen Wiesbaden	Mannheim
14:00	Nilsson 89'	Report		Stadium: Carl-Benz-Stadion; Attendance: 0 Referee: Tobias Schultes

22 February 2021 25	SV Wehen Wiesbaden	3–1	KFC Uerdingen	Wiesbaden
19:00	Medić 19'; Malone 32', 38'	Report	Wagner 10'	Stadium: Brita-Arena; Attendance: 0 Referee: Wolfgang Haslberger

27 February 2021 26	SV Wehen Wiesbaden	1–0	1. FC Magdeburg	Wiesbaden
14:00	Medić 80'	Report		Stadium: Brita-Arena; Attendance: 0 Referee: Michael Bacher

7 March 2021 27	Bayern Munich II	2–0	SV Wehen Wiesbaden	Munich
14:00	Boss 24' (og.); Zaiser 90+4'	Report		Stadium: Grünwalder Stadion; Attendance: 0 Referee: Tom Bauer

13 March 2021 28	SV Wehen Wiesbaden	1–2	FC Ingolstadt	Wiesbaden
14:00	Malone 9'	Report	Kutschke 12', 44' (pen.)	Stadium: Brita-Arena; Attendance: 0 Referee: Florian Exner

21 March 2021 29	FSV Zwickau	2–1	SV Wehen Wiesbaden	Zwickau
14:00	Schikora 53'; Schröter 53'	Report	Hollerbach 45+1'	Stadium: Stadion Zwickau; Attendance: 0 Referee: Florian Heft

3 April 2021 30	SV Wehen Wiesbaden	2–2	1. FC Saarbrücken	Wiesbaden
14:00	Tietz 84', 90+1'	Report	Günther-Schmidt 57', 61'	Stadium: Brita-Arena; Attendance: 0 Referee: Sven Waschitzki

12 April 2021 31	SV Meppen	0–3	SV Wehen Wiesbaden	Meppen
19:00		Report	Tietz 13', 48'; Korte 72'	Stadium: Hänsch-Arena; Attendance: 0 Referee: Guido Winkmann

18 April 2021 32	SV Wehen Wiesbaden	1–0	SpVgg Unterhaching	Wiesbaden
15:00	Kempe 3'	Report		Stadium: Brita-Arena; Attendance: 0 Referee: Mitja Stegemann

21 April 2021 33	Hansa Rostock	1–1	SV Wehen Wiesbaden	Rostock
19:00	Bahn 50' (pen.)	Report	Carstens 90+6'	Stadium: Ostseestadion; Attendance: 0 Referee: Robin Braun

25 April 2021 34	SV Wehen Wiesbaden	0–3	MSV Duisburg	Wiesbaden
14:00		Report	Bouhaddouz 46'; Kamavuaka 66'; Stoppelkamp 72'	Stadium: Brita-Arena; Attendance: 0 Referee: Patrick Hanslbauer

4 May 2021 35	VfB Lübeck	0–3	SV Wehen Wiesbaden	Lübeck
19:00		Report	Nilsson 12'; Lankford 43'; Malone 67'	Stadium: Stadion Lohmühle; Attendance: 0 Referee: Florian Lechner

8 May 2021 36	SV Wehen Wiesbaden	1–1	1860 Munich	Wiesbaden
14:00	Wurtz 30'	Report	Steinhart 80'	Stadium: Brita-Arena; Attendance: 0 Referee: Christian Dingert

16 May 2021 37	Hallescher FC	4–0	SV Wehen Wiesbaden	Halle
13:00	Eberwein 21'; Derstroff 22'; Boyd 60', 64'	Report		Stadium: Erdgas Sportpark; Attendance: 0 Referee: Florian Exner

22 May 2021 38	SV Wehen Wiesbaden	0–1	Dynamo Dresden	Wiesbaden
13:30		Report	Sohm 21'	Stadium: Brita-Arena; Attendance: 0 Referee: Patrick Hanslbauer

=== DFB-Pokal ===
13 September 2020 First round	SV Wehen Wiesbaden	1–0	1. FC Heidenheim	Wiesbaden
18:30 CEST (UTC+2)	Tietz 61'	Report		Stadium: Brita-Arena; Attendance: 250; Referee: Benjamin Brand

23 December 2020 Second round	SV Wehen Wiesbaden	0–0 (a.e.t.) (2–4 p)	Jahn Regensburg	Wiesbaden
20:45 CET (UTC+1)		Report		Stadium: Brita-Arena; Attendance: 0 Referee: Tobias Reichel
	Penalties
	Kempe (penalty scored); Tietz (penalty missed); Gürleyen (penalty scored); Prokop (penalty missed)		(penalty scored) Wekesser; (penalty scored) Albers; (penalty scored) George; (penalty scored) Opoku
