= Isak Hansen-Aarøen =

Norwegian footballer (born 2004)

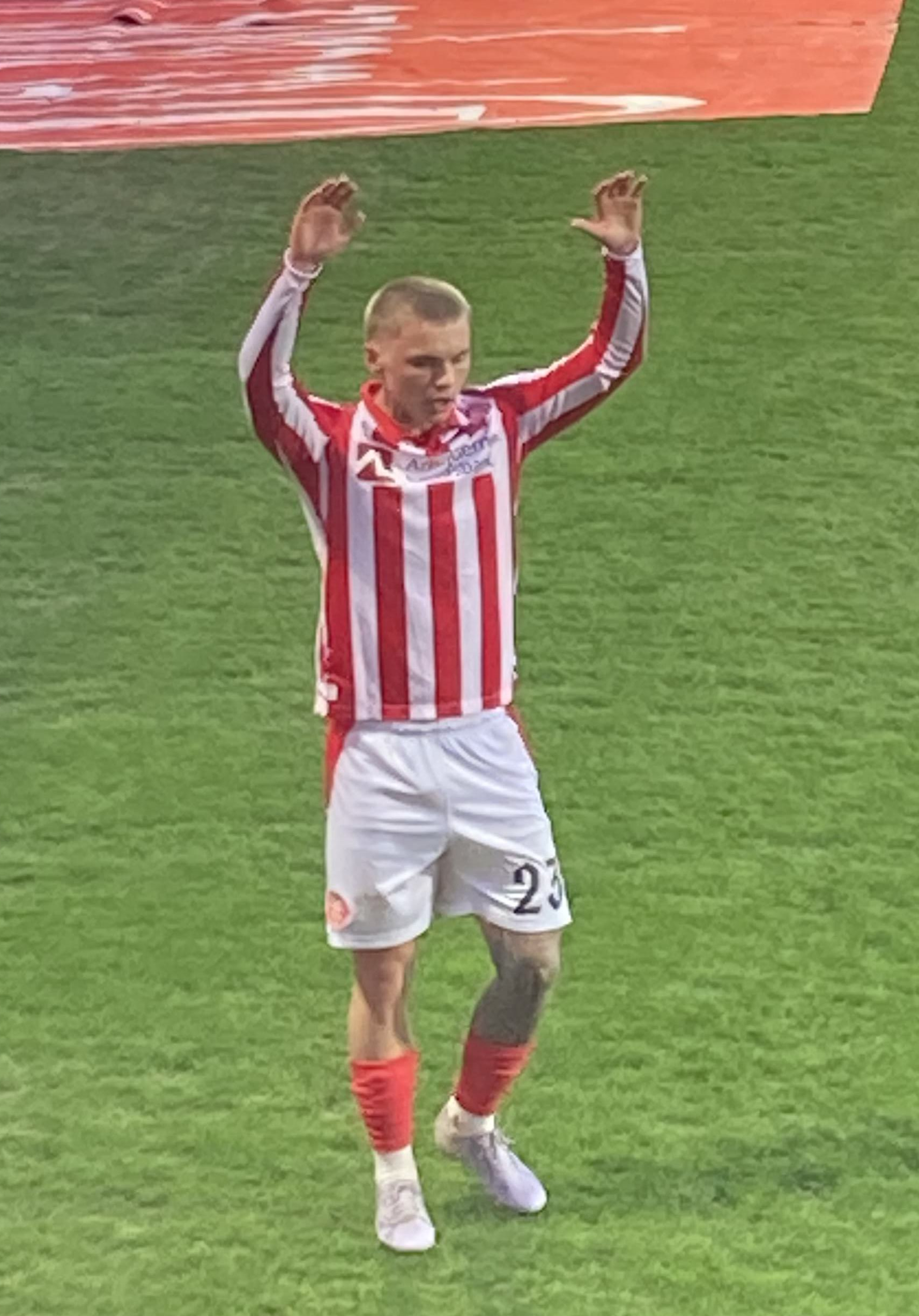
- Hansen-Aarøen with AaB in 2025

Personal information
- Date of birth: 22 August 2004 (age 22)
- Place of birth: Tromsø, Norway
- Height: 1.73 m (5 ft 8 in)
- Position: Attacking midfielder

Team information
- Current team: NEC
- Number: 8

Youth career
- –2020: Tromsø
- 2020–2024: Manchester United

Senior career*
| Years | Team | Apps | (Gls) |
| 2020 | Tromsø | 7 | (0) |
| 2024–2026 | Werder Bremen | 4 | (0) |
| 2024–2026 | Werder Bremen II | 6 | (2) |
| 2025 | → AaB (loan) | 14 | (0) |
| 2026– | NEC | 5 | (0) |

International career^{‡}
| 2019 | Norway U15 | 7 | (2) |
| 2020 | Norway U16 | 3 | (3) |
| 2021–2022 | Norway U18 | 12 | (3) |
| 2022–2023 | Norway U19 | 14 | (3) |
| 2023–2024 | Norway U21 | 14 | (3) |
- * Club domestic league appearances and goals as of 8 September 2026 ‡ National team caps and goals as of 26 May 2025

Isak Hansen-Aarøen (born 22 August 2004) is a Norwegian professional footballer who plays as an attacking midfielder for Eredivisie club NEC.

Hansen-Aarøen played for Tromsø's first-team at the age of 15, in the second-tier of Norwegian football, before joining Manchester United's youth system in 2020. He is a Norwegian youth international and has represented the country at under-15, under-16, under-18, under-19 and under-21 levels.

== Club career ==
=== Tromsø and Manchester United ===
Hansen-Aarøen began his career in Tromsø's youth system. At the age of ten, he participated in the Manchester United Soccer Schools World Skills Final held at Manchester United's training facilities. In 2019, Hansen-Aarøen won the under-15 Talent of the Year award in a contest organised by the Norwegian Football Federation, TV 2 and Equinor's Heroes of Tomorrow initiative.

He made his senior debut for Tromsø on 6 July 2020, replacing Kent-Are Antonsen for the last minutes of a 2–0 win at Kongsvinger in a Norwegian 1. divisjon match. He became the youngest player in the club's history at the age of 15 years and 323 days.

In August 2020, he joined Manchester United. He had previously had trials with Liverpool and Everton. On 29 September he made his EFL Trophy debut for United's U21 team against Rochdale. On 2 October, he made his Premier League 2 debut against Blackburn Rovers U23s. On 27 August 2021, he signed his first professional contract with Manchester United.

=== Werder Bremen ===
On 1 February 2024, the last day of the German transfer window, Hansen-Aarøen joined Bundesliga club Werder Bremen. He reportedly signed a contract until 2028. He made his Bundesliga debut on 30 March 2024, coming on as a substitute for Skelly Alvero after 79 minutes in a 2–0 loss against VfL Wolfsburg. He made three appearances in total in the second half of the 2023–24 season.

In December 2024, after Hansen-Aarøen had not featured in the Bundesliga while scoring one goal in two Regionalliga Nord appearances for Werder Bremen's reserves, it was announced he would join Danish Superliga club Aalborg BK on loan for the second half of the season.

=== NEC ===
On 1 February 2026, Hansen-Aarøen signed a contract with NEC in the Netherlands for an initial term of one-and-a-half years, with the club holding an option to extend for two more seasons.

== International career ==
Hansen-Aarøen has played internationally for Norway at under-15, under-16, under-18, under-19 and under-21 levels. On 20 February 2020, he scored a hat-trick against Slovakia under-16.

== Career statistics ==
As of match played 8 September 2026

Appearances and goals by club, season and competition
| Club | Season | League | | | National cup | | League cup | | Europe | | Other | | Total | |
| Club | Season | Division | Apps | Goals | Apps | Goals | Apps | Goals | Apps | Goals | Apps | Goals | Apps | Goals |
|---|---|---|---|---|---|---|---|---|---|---|---|---|---|---|
| Tromsø | 2020 | 1. divisjon | 7 | 0 | — | | — | | — | | — | | 7 | 0 |
| Manchester United U21 | 2020–21 | — | | | — | | — | | — | | 1 (Note: Appearance(s) in the EFL Trophy) | 0 | 1 | 0 |
| Manchester United U21 | 2021–22 | — | | | — | | — | | — | | 0 | 0 | 0 | 0 |
| Manchester United U21 | 2022–23 | — | | | — | | — | | — | | 3 | 0 | 3 | 0 |
| Manchester United U21 | Total | | — | | — | | — | | — | | 4 | 0 | 4 | 0 |
| Werder Bremen | 2023–24 | Bundesliga | 3 | 0 | — | | — | | — | | — | | 3 | 0 |
| Werder Bremen | 2025–26 | Bundesliga | 1 | 0 | 0 | 0 | — | | — | | — | | 1 | 0 |
| Werder Bremen | Total | | 4 | 0 | 0 | 0 | — | | — | | — | | 4 | 0 |
| Werder Bremen II | 2024–25 | Regionalliga Nord | 2 | 0 | — | | — | | — | | — | | 2 | 0 |
| Werder Bremen II | 2025–26 | Regionalliga Nord | 4 | 0 | — | | — | | — | | — | | 4 | 0 |
| Werder Bremen II | Total | | 6 | 0 | — | | — | | — | | — | | 6 | 0 |
| AaB (loan) | 2024–25 | Danish Superliga | 14 | 0 | — | | — | | — | | — | | 14 | 0 |
| NEC | 2025–26 | Eredivisie | 3 | 0 | 0 | 0 | — | | — | | — | | 3 | 0 |
| NEC | 2026–27 | Eredivisie | 2 | 0 | 0 | 0 | — | | 2 (Note: Two appearances in UEFA Champions League) | 0 | — | | 4 | 0 |
| NEC | Total | | 5 | 0 | 0 | 0 | — | | 2 | 0 | — | | 7 | 0 |
| Career total | | | 36 | 0 | 0 | 0 | 0 | 0 | 2 | 0 | 4 | 0 | 42 | 0 |

== Honours ==
Manchester United U18

- FA Youth Cup: 2021–22
