= 2023–24 SV Werder Bremen season =

SV Werder Bremen
2023–24 season
- President: Hubertus Hess-Grunewald
- Head coach: Ole Werner
- Stadium: Weserstadion
- Bundesliga: 9th
- DFB-Pokal: First round
- Top goalscorer: League: Marvin Ducksch (12); All: Marvin Ducksch (13)
- Highest home attendance: 42,358 (24 February vs Darmstadt)
- Lowest home attendance: 41,000 (five times)
- Average home league attendance: 41,695
- Biggest win: 4–0 (v. Mainz 05, 5 August)
- Biggest defeat: 0–5 (v. Bayer Leverkusen, 14 April)
Home colours	Away colours	Third colours

The 2023–24 season was SV Werder Bremen's 125th season in existence and second consecutive season in the Bundesliga. They also competed in the DFB-Pokal.

== Players ==
=== First-team squad ===
As of 1 April 2024

Note: Flags indicate national team as defined under FIFA eligibility rules; some limited exceptions apply. Players may hold more than one non-FIFA nationality.

No.	Pos.	Nation	Player
1	GK	CZE	Jiří Pavlenka
2	MF	BEL	Olivier Deman
3	DF	GER	Anthony Jung
4	DF	GER	Niklas Stark (4th captain)
5	DF	GER	Amos Pieper
6	MF	DEN	Jens Stage
7	FW	GER	Marvin Ducksch
8	DF	GER	Mitchell Weiser
9	FW	POL	Dawid Kownacki
10	MF	GER	Leonardo Bittencourt
13	DF	SRB	Miloš Veljković (vice-captain)
14	MF	BEL	Senne Lynen
17	FW	GER	Justin Njinmah

No.	Pos.	Nation	Player
18	MF	GUI	Naby Keïta
20	MF	AUT	Romano Schmid
21	MF	NOR	Isak Hansen-Aarøen
22	DF	ARG	Julián Malatini
26	FW	USA	Joel Imasuen
27	DF	GER	Felix Agu
28	MF	FRA	Skelly Alvero (on loan from Lyon)
29	FW	GER	Nick Woltemade
30	GK	GER	Michael Zetterer
32	DF	AUT	Marco Friedl (captain)
35	MF	GER	Leon Opitz
36	MF	GER	Christian Groß (3rd captain)
38	GK	GER	Dudu

=== Players out on loan ===
Note: Flags indicate national team as defined under FIFA eligibility rules; some limited exceptions apply. Players may hold more than one non-FIFA nationality.

No.	Pos.	Nation	Player
—	GK	GER	Mio Backhaus (to FC Volendam until 30 June 2024)
—	MF	TOG	Dikeni Salifou (to Juventus Next Gen until 30 June 2024)
—	FW	GER	Eren Dinkçi (to 1. FC Heidenheim until 30 June 2024)

No.	Pos.	Nation	Player
—	FW	GER	Abdenego Nankishi (to Heracles Almelo until 30 June 2024)
—	FW	SCO	Oliver Burke (to Birmingham City until 30 June 2024)

== Transfers ==
=== In ===
Pos.	Player	Transferred from	Fee	Date	Source
MF	(Guinea) Naby Keïta	(England) Liverpool	Free	1 July 2023	
FW	(Poland) Dawid Kownacki	(Germany) Fortuna Düsseldorf	Free	1 July 2023	
MF	(Belgium) Senne Lynen	(Belgium) Union SG	€2,000,000	8 August 2023	
MF	(Belgium) Olivier Deman	(Belgium) Cercle Brugge	€4,000,000	31 August 2023	
FW	(Colombia) Rafael Santos Borré	(Germany) Eintracht Frankfurt	Loan	1 September 2023	
MF	(France) Skelly Alvero	(France) Lyon	Loan	31 January 2024	
MF	(Norway) Isak Hansen-Aarøen	(England) Manchester United U21		1 February 2024	

=== Out ===
Pos.	Player	Transferred to	Fee	Date	Source
DF	(Italy) Fabio Chiarodia	(Germany) Borussia Mönchengladbach	€2,100,000	1 July 2023	
FW	(Germany) Eren Dinkçi	(Germany) 1. FC Heidenheim	Loan	1 July 2023	
MF	(Germany) Yannik Engelhardt	(Germany) SC Freiburg II	€900,000	1 July 2023	
DF	(South Korea) Park Kyu-hyun	(Germany) Dynamo Dresden	€155,000	1 July 2023	
MF	(Germany) Oscar Schönfelder	(Germany) Jahn Regensburg	€260,000	1 July 2023	
GK	(Germany) Mio Backhaus	(Netherlands) FC Volendam	Loan	5 July 2023	
DF	(England) Lee Buchanan	(England) Birmingham City	€1,300,000	26 July 2023	
DF	(Germany) Niklas Schmidt	(France) Toulouse	€2,500,000	4 August 2023	
MF	(Germany) Jean-Manuel Mbom	(Denmark) Viborg	Undisclosed	24 August 2023	
FW	(Germany) Niclas Füllkrug	(Germany) Borussia Dortmund	€13,000,000	31 August 2023	
MF	(Bulgaria) Ilia Gruev	(England) Leeds United	€4,650,000	31 August 2023	
FW	(Scotland) Oliver Burke	(England) Birmingham City	Loan	1 September 2023	
MF	(Togo) Dikeni Salifou	(Italy) Juventus Next Gen	Loan	1 September 2023	
FW	(Colombia) Rafael Santos Borré	(Germany) Eintracht Frankfurt	Loan	4 March 2024	

=== New contracts ===
Position	Player	Until	Ref.
FW	(Germany) Marvin Ducksch	June 2026	
DF	(Germany) Mitchell Weiser	TBD	

== Pre-season and friendlies ==
Win Draw Loss Fixtures

9 July 2023 Friendly	Werder Bremen	2–1	SV Drochtersen/Assel	Verden an der Aller
15:30 CEST (UTC+2)	Kownacki 48'; Burke 79'	Report	Göttel 34'	Stadium: Stadion am Berliner Ring

16 July 2023 Friendly	Werder Bremen	3–1	VfB Oldenburg	Westerstede
15:00 CEST (UTC+2)	Njinmah 23'; Rapp (yellow card) 36'; Kownacki 62'; Mbom 64'	Report	Herbst (yellow card) 31'; Wegner 33'; Krasniqi (yellow card) 44'	Stadium: Hössen-Sportzentrum A-Platz

22 July 2023 Friendly	Werder Bremen	5–2	Toulouse	Zell am Ziller, Austria
15:30 CEST (UTC+2)	Schmid 36'; Füllkrug 50' 73'; Kownacki 62' 82'		Bangré 15'; Onaiwu 57'	Stadium: Parkstadion de Zell

28 July 2023 Friendly	RB Leipzig	0–0	Werder Bremen	Innsbruck, Austria
15:45 CEST (UTC+2)				Stadium: Tivoli Stadion Tirol

28 July 2023 Friendly	Werder Bremen	1–1	Ipswich Town	Innsbruck, Austria
17:00 CEST (UTC+2)	Kownacki 12'		Leigh 54'	Stadium: Tivoli Stadion Tirol

5 August 2023 Friendly	Strasbourg	3–3	Werder Bremen	Strasbourg, France
15:30 CEST (UTC+2)	Aholou 6'; Senaya 18'; Mothiba 45+1'		Schmid 27'; Woltemade 34' (pen.); Njinmah 71' (pen.)	Stadium: Stade de la Meinau

5 August 2023 Friendly	Strasbourg	2–1	Werder Bremen	Strasbourg, France
18:30 CEST (UTC+2)	Diallo 64'; Sylla 86'		Stage 34'	Stadium: Stade de la Meinau

7 September 2023 Friendly	Borussia Mönchengladbach	0–1	Werder Bremen	Willingen
17:30 CEST (UTC+2)			Njinmah 85'	Stadium: Uplandstadion

12 October 2023 Friendly	Werder Bremen	3–3	St. Pauli	Bremen
12:00 CEST (UTC+2)	Njinmah 3'; Stage 54'; Kownacki 58' (pen.)	Report	Hartel 12' (pen.); Saad 50', 65'	Stadium: Weserstadion Platz 11; Attendance: 0 Referee: Christoph Kluge

16 November 2023 Friendly	Werder Bremen	1–2	Hansa Rostock	Bremen
13:30 CET (UTC+1)				Attendance: 0

7 January 2024 Friendly	Eintracht Braunschweig	3–1	Werder Bremen	Braunschweig
15:00 CET (UTC+1)	Kaufmann 10'; Philippe 41'; Helgason 47'	Report	Woltemade 83'	Stadium: Eintracht-Stadion

21 March 2024 Friendly	Hannover 96	3–1	Werder Bremen	Hanover
13:00 CET (UTC+1)	Gindorf 43'; Damar 47'; Dehm 82'	Report	Imasuen 62'	Stadium: Eilenriedestadion

== Competitions ==
=== Overall record ===
Competition	First match	Last match	Starting round	Final position	Record							
Competition	First match	Last match	Starting round	Final position	Pld	W	D	L	GF	GA	GD	Win %
Bundesliga	18 August 2023	18 May 2024	Matchday 1	9th	34	11	9	14	48	54	−6	32.35
DFB-Pokal	12 August 2023		First round	First round	1	0	0	1	2	3	−1	0.00
Total					35	11	9	15	50	57	−7	31.43

Source: Soccerway

=== Bundesliga ===
==== League table ====
Pos	Team	Pld	W	D	L	GF	GA	GD	Pts	Qualification or relegation
7	TSG Hoffenheim	34	13	7	14	66	66	0	46	Qualification for the Europa League league phase (Note: Since the 2023–24 DFB-Pokal winners, Bayer Leverkusen, qualified for the Champions League via league position, the spot reserved for the DFB-Pokal winners (Europa League league phase) was passed to the seventh-placed team, and the Conference League play-off round spot was passed to the eighth-placed team.)
8	1. FC Heidenheim	34	10	12	12	50	55	−5	42	Qualification for the Conference League play-off round
9	Werder Bremen	34	11	9	14	48	54	−6	42	
10	SC Freiburg	34	11	9	14	45	58	−13	42	
11	FC Augsburg	34	10	9	15	50	60	−10	39	

Source: DFB
Rules for classification: 1) Points; 2) Goal difference; 3) Goals scored; 4) Head-to-head results; 5) Head-to-head away goals scored; 6) Away goals scored; 7) Play-off.

==== Results summary ====
Overall								Home						Away					
Pld	W	D	L	GF	GA	GD	Pts	W	D	L	GF	GA	GD	W	D	L	GF	GA	GD
34	11	9	14	48	54	−6	42	7	4	6	29	26	+3	4	5	8	19	28	−9

Source: DFB

==== Results by round ====
Round	1	2	3	4	5	6	7	8	9	10	11	12	13	14	15	16	17	18	19	20	21	22	23	24	25	26	27	28	29	30	31	32	33	34
Ground	H	A	H	A	H	A	H	A	H	A	H	H	A	H	A	H	A	A	H	A	H	A	H	A	H	A	H	A	A	H	A	H	A	H
Result	L	L	W	L	W	L	L	L	W	D	D	L	L	W	D	D	D	W	W	W	L	W	D	L	L	L	L	D	L	W	W	D	D	W
Position	17	18	11	12	11	12	14	14	12	12	12	12	13	12	14	13	13	13	9	9	10	7	7	8	10	10	10	12	12	11	11	11	11	9

Source: DFB
A = Away; H = Home; W = Win; D = Draw; L = Loss

==== Matches ====
The league fixtures were unveiled on 30 June 2023.

18 August 2023 1	Werder Bremen	0–4	Bayern Munich	Bremen
20:30 CEST (UTC+2)	Ducksch (yellow card) 20'; Lynen (yellow card) 56'	Report	Sané 4', 90'; Kim (yellow card) 55'; Kane 74'; Tel 90+4'	Stadium: Weserstadion; Attendance: 42,100; Referee: Felix Zwayer

26 August 2023 2	SC Freiburg	1–0	Werder Bremen	Freiburg
15:30 CEST (UTC+2)	Kübler (yellow card) 38'; Höfler (yellow card) 45'; Philipp 90+6'	Report	Schmid (yellow card) 6'; Friedl (yellow card) 55'	Stadium: Europa-Park Stadion; Attendance: 34,700; Referee: Benjamin Brand

2 September 2023 3	Werder Bremen	4–0	Mainz 05	Bremen
15:30 CEST (UTC+2)	Ducksch 3' (pen.); Stage (yellow card) 10', (goal) 53'; Stark (yellow card) 45+3'; Friedl (yellow card) 55'; Bittencourt 82'; Njinmah 83'	Report	Hanche-Olsen (yellow card) 2'; Van den Berg (yellow card) 65'	Stadium: Weserstadion; Attendance: 41,000; Referee: Robert Schröder

17 September 2023 4	1. FC Heidenheim	4–2	Werder Bremen	Heidenheim
15:30 CEST (UTC+2)	Kleindienst 5' (pen.); Dinkçi 44', 68'; Traoré (yellow card) 50'; Beste 76'	Report	Ducksch (penalty missed) 49', 49'; Weiser 64'; Stark (yellow card) 90+5'	Stadium: Voith-Arena; Attendance: 15,000; Referee: Patrick Ittrich

23 September 2023 5	Werder Bremen	2–1	1. FC Köln	Bremen
18:30 CEST (UTC+2)	Borré 38'; Njinmah 67'; Weiser (yellow card) 79'; Veljković (yellow card) 88'	Report	Selke 31'; Alidou (yellow card) 73'	Stadium: Weserstadion; Attendance: 42,100; Referee: Bastian Dankert

1 October 2023 6	Darmstadt 98	4–2	Werder Bremen	Darmstadt
15:30 CEST (UTC+2)	Bader 5'; Skarke 25'; Mehlem (yellow card) 40', (goal) 50'; Holland (yellow card) 52'; Kempe 62' (pen.); Franjić (yellow card) 90+4'	Report	Lynen (yellow card) 31'; Deman 70', (yellow card) 90+3'; Veljković 79'	Stadium: Merck-Stadion am Böllenfalltor; Attendance: 17,810; Referee: Martin Petersen

7 October 2023 7	Werder Bremen	2–3	1899 Hoffenheim	Bremen
18:30 CEST (UTC+2)	Schmid 17'; Keïta (yellow card) 32'; Ducksch (yellow card) 45+1'; Weiser (yellow card) 56'; Rapp (yellow card) 58'; Stage 90+1'; Jung (yellow card) 90+2'	Report	Beier 8'; Prömel 29', (yellow card) 69'; Akpoguma (yellow card) 72'; Baumann (yellow card) 90'; Bülter 90+2'; Vogt (yellow card) 90+5'	Stadium: Weserstadion; Attendance: 41,000; Referee: Christian Dingert

20 October 2023 8	Borussia Dortmund	1–0	Werder Bremen	Dortmund
19:30 CEST (UTC+2)	Nmecha (yellow card) 44'; Brandt 67'	Report	Bittencourt (yellow card) 61'; Stage (yellow card) 75'; Veljković (yellow card) 83'; Deman (yellow card) 90+5'	Stadium: Signal Iduna Park; Attendance: 81,365; Referee: Felix Brych

28 October 2023 9	Werder Bremen	2–0	Union Berlin	Bremen
13:30 CEST (UTC+2)	Knoche 38' (o.g.); Stage (yellow card) 73'; Ducksch 75'	Report	Gosens (yellow card) 56'; Khedira (red card) 60'; Leite (yellow card) 80'; Hollerbach (yellow card) 85'; Laïdouni (yellow card) 90+6'	Stadium: Weserstadion; Attendance: 42,100; Referee: Tobias Stieler

5 November 2023 10	VfL Wolfsburg	2–2	Werder Bremen	Wolfsburg
13:30 CET (UTC+1)	Lacroix (yellow card) 6' (yellow-red card) 88'; Černý 37'; Paredes 59', (yellow card) 66'; Wind (yellow card) 80'	Report	Ducksch 7'; Bittencourt (yellow card) 64'; Borré 65'	Stadium: Volkswagen Arena; Attendance: 28,917; Referee: Tobias Reichel

12 November 2023 11	Werder Bremen	2–2	Eintracht Frankfurt	Bremen
17:30 CET (UTC+1)	Ducksch 45+2' (pen.); Jung (yellow card) 46'; Borré 50'	Report	Chaïbi (yellow card) 25'; Max (yellow card) 37'; Knauff (yellow card) 45+1'; Skhiri 65'; Smolčić 75'	Stadium: Weserstadion; Attendance: 42,100; Referee: Benjamin Brand

25 November 2023 12	Werder Bremen	0–3	Bayer Leverkusen	Bremen
15:30 CET (UTC+1)	Bittencourt (yellow card) 14'; Friedl (yellow card) 36'; Deman (yellow card) 54'	Report	Deman 9' (o.g.); Frimpong 43'; Grimaldo 76', (yellow card) 76'	Stadium: Weserstadion; Attendance: 42,100; Referee: Martin Petersen

2 December 2023 13	VfB Stuttgart	2–0	Werder Bremen	Stuttgart
18:30 CET (UTC+1)	Undav 17'; Guirassy 75' (pen.); Stenzel (yellow card) 86'	Report		Stadium: MHPArena; Attendance: 54,500; Referee: Bastian Dankert

9 December 2023 14	Werder Bremen	2–0	FC Augsburg	Bremen
15:30 CET (UTC+1)	Stark 39'; Ducksch 65'; Zetterer (yellow card) 78'	Report	Demirović (yellow card) 27'; Dorsch (yellow card) 80'	Stadium: Weserstadion; Attendance: 41,000; Referee: Sascha Stegemann

15 December 2023 15	Borussia Mönchengladbach	2–2	Werder Bremen	Mönchengladbach
20:30 CET (UTC+1)	Wöber (yellow card) 34'; Reitz 45', 49'; Honorat (yellow card) 45+5'; Weigl (yellow card) 66'; Kramer (yellow card) 90+4'	Report	Borré 7'; Weiser (yellow card) 45+5'; Schmid (yellow card) 51'; Ducksch 76'	Stadium: Borussia-Park; Attendance: 50,660; Referee: Felix Zwayer

19 December 2023 16	Werder Bremen	1–1	RB Leipzig	Bremen
18:30 CET (UTC+1)	Groß (yellow card) 59'; Bittencourt (yellow card) 66'; Njinmah 75', (yellow card) 84'; Ducksch (yellow card) 90+1'	Report	Openda 47'; Kampl (yellow card) 69'; Haidara (yellow card) 90+1'	Stadium: Weserstadion; Attendance: 41,000; Referee: Tobias Reichel

14 January 2024 17	VfL Bochum	1–1	Werder Bremen	Bochum
15:30 CET (UTC+1)	Gamboa (yellow card) 3'; Stöger (yellow card) 25'; Osterhage 64'; Bero (yellow card) 72'; Losilla (yellow card) 75'; Riemann (yellow card) 90+5'; Bernardo (yellow card) 90+6'	Report	Jung (yellow card) 25'; Stage (yellow card) 35'; Bittencourt (yellow card) 42'; Stark (yellow card) 66', (goal) 90+3'; Ducksch (yellow card) 82'	Stadium: Vonovia-Ruhrstadion; Attendance: 26,000; Referee: Tobias Stieler

21 January 2024 18	Bayern Munich	0–1	Werder Bremen	Munich
15:30 CET (UTC+1)	Kimmich (yellow card) 17'; De Ligt (yellow card) 74'	Report	Weiser 59'; Schmid (yellow card) 70'	Stadium: Allianz Arena; Attendance: 75,000; Referee: Marco Fritz

27 January 2024 19	Werder Bremen	3–1	SC Freiburg	Bremen
15:30 CET (UTC+1)	Ducksch 9' (pen.); Stark (yellow card) 51'; Njinmah 53'; Lynen (yellow card) 89'; Malatini 90+3'	Report	Grifo 28' (pen.); Gregoritsch (yellow card) 90'	Stadium: Weserstadion; Attendance: 41,500; Referee: Robert Hartmann

3 February 2024 20	Mainz 05	0–1	Werder Bremen	Mainz
15:30 CET (UTC+1)	Krauß (yellow card) 67'; Amiri (yellow card) 80'; Richter (yellow card) 87'; Caci (yellow card) 88'	Report	Ducksch 2'; Stark (yellow card) 35'; Friedl (yellow card) 45+1'; Bittencourt (yellow card) 88'	Stadium: Mewa Arena; Attendance: 31,800; Referee: Benjamin Brand

10 February 2024 21	Werder Bremen	1–2	1. FC Heidenheim	Bremen
15:30 CET (UTC+1)	Schmid 19'; Deman (yellow card) 45'	Report	Kleindienst (yellow card) 2'; Maloney 12', (yellow card) 43'; Beste 18'	Stadium: Weserstadion; Attendance: 41,000; Referee: Robert Schröder

16 February 2024 22	1. FC Köln	0–1	Werder Bremen	Cologne
20:30 CET (UTC+1)	Kainz (yellow card) 26'; Thielmann (yellow card) 77'; Huseinbašić (yellow card) 90+2'; Hübers (yellow card) 90+5'	Report	Schmid (yellow card) 26'; Njinmah 70'; Weiser (yellow card) 77'; Malatini (yellow card) 88'	Stadium: RheinEnergieStadion; Attendance: 50,000; Referee: Daniel Siebert

24 February 2024 23	Werder Bremen	1–1	Darmstadt 98	Bremen
13:30 CET (UTC+1)	Zimmerman 8' (o.g.); Ducksch (yellow card) 20'; Lynen (yellow card) 35'; Jung (yellow card) 38'	Report	Justvan 33'; Holland (yellow card) 52'; Gjasula (yellow card) 56'; Maglica (yellow card) 67'; Karić (yellow card) 89'	Stadium: Weserstadion; Attendance: 42,358; Referee: Florian Badstübner

3 March 2024 24	1899 Hoffenheim	2–1	Werder Bremen	Hoffenheim
16:30 CET (UTC+1)	Beier 8', 44'; Grillitsch (yellow card) 49'; Stach (yellow card) 51'; Bülter (yellow card) 61' (yellow-red card) 73'; Kadeřábek (yellow card) 78'	Report	Deman (yellow card) 85'; Alvero 90+2'	Stadium: Rhein-Neckar-Arena; Attendance: 25,000; Referee: Matthias Jöllenbeck

9 March 2024 25	Werder Bremen	1–2	Borussia Dortmund	Bremen
16:30 CET (UTC+1)	Njinmah 70'; Schmid (yellow card) 77'	Report	Malen 21'; Sancho 38'; Sabitzer (red card) 45+1'; Schlotterbeck (yellow card) 78'; Adeyemi (yellow card) 90+5'	Stadium: Weserstadion; Attendance: 42,100; Referee: Deniz Aytekin

16 March 2024 26	Union Berlin	2–1	Werder Bremen	Berlin
15:30 CET (UTC+1)	Vogt (yellow card) 26'; Gosens (yellow card) 27'; Tousart (yellow card) 30'; Vertessen 50'; Aaronson 52'	Report	Weiser (yellow card) 38', (goal) 63'; Ducksch (yellow card) 41'; Stage (yellow card) 72'; Keïta (yellow card) 90'	Stadium: Stadion An der Alten Försterei; Attendance: 22,012; Referee: Daniel Schlager

30 March 2024 27	Werder Bremen	0–2	VfL Wolfsburg	Bremen
15:30 CET (UTC+1)	Agu (yellow card) 14'; Jung (red card) 43'; Ducksch (yellow card) 45+4'; Alvero (yellow card) 72'; Hansen-Aarøen (yellow card) 89'	Report	Lacroix 45+4', (red card) 76'; Baku (yellow card) 51'; Bornauw (yellow card) 70'; Zesiger (yellow card) 80'; Majer 84'; Paredes (yellow card) 90+2'	Stadium: Weserstadion; Attendance: 41,500; Referee: Sascha Stegemann

5 April 2024 28	Eintracht Frankfurt	1–1	Werder Bremen	Frankfurt
20:30 CEST (UTC+2)	Marmoush (yellow card) 24'; Dina Ebimbe (yellow card) 45'; Tuta 77', (yellow card) 83', (red card) 89'	Report	Veljković 62'; Friedl (yellow card) 69'; Stage (red card) 73'; Ducksch (yellow card) 77'	Stadium: Deutsche Bank Park; Attendance: 55,000; Referee: Robert Hartmann

14 April 2024 29	Bayer Leverkusen	5–0	Werder Bremen	Leverkusen
17:30 CEST (UTC+2)	Boniface 25' (pen.); Adli (yellow card) 31'; Hincapié (yellow card) 47'; Xhaka 60'; Wirtz 68', 83', 90'	Report	Bittencourt (yellow card) 47'	Stadium: BayArena; Attendance: 30,210; Referee: Harm Osmers

21 April 2024 30	Werder Bremen	2–1	VfB Stuttgart	Bremen
13:30 CEST (UTC+2)	Ducksch 28' (pen.), 49'; Bittencourt (yellow card) 51'; Zetterer (yellow card) 68'; Agu (yellow card) 74'	Report	Leweling (yellow card) 27'; Millot (yellow card) 35'; Stiller (yellow card) 53'; Undav 71'	Stadium: Weserstadion; Attendance: 42,100; Referee: Robert Schröder

27 April 2024 31	FC Augsburg	0–3	Werder Bremen	Augsburg
15:30 CEST (UTC+2)	Jakić (yellow card) 64'	Report	Friedl (yellow card) 5'; Schmid 52'; Ducksch 61' (pen.); Woltemade (yellow card) 63'; Deman 90'	Stadium: WWK Arena; Attendance: 30,660; Referee: Tobias Welz

4 May 2024 32	Werder Bremen	2–2	Borussia Mönchengladbach	Bremen
15:30 CEST (UTC+2)	Woltemade 45', 65'	Report	Hack 8'; Neuhaus 90+1' (pen.)	Stadium: Weserstadion; Attendance: 42,100; Referee: Timo Gerach

11 May 2024 33	RB Leipzig	1–1	Werder Bremen	Leipzig
15:30 CEST (UTC+2)	Henrichs (yellow card) 28'; Šeško 61'	Report	Seiwald 36' (o.g.)	Stadium: Red Bull Arena; Attendance: 47,069; Referee: Sascha Stegemann

18 May 2024 34	Werder Bremen	4–1	VfL Bochum	Bremen
15:30 CEST (UTC+2)	Griedl 6'; Lynen (yellow card) 36'; Jung 78'; Stage 80'; Schmid 87'	Report	Wittek (yellow card) 37'; Antwi-Adjei 85'	Stadium: Weserstadion; Attendance: 42,100; Referee: Martin Petersen

=== DFB-Pokal ===
12 August 2023 First round	Viktoria Köln	3–2	Werder Bremen	Cologne
15:30 CEST (UTC+2)	Fritz (yellow card) 70'; Philipp 72', 79'; Bogićević 90+4'	Report	Pieper (red card) 11'; Ducksch 43'; Stage (yellow card) 70'; Bittencourt (yellow card) 70'; Füllkrug 77' (pen.)	Stadium: Sportpark Höhenberg; Attendance: 8,343; Referee: Frank Willenborg

== Statistics ==
=== Appearances and goals ===
No.	Pos	Nat	Player	Total		Bundesliga		DFB-Pokal	
No.	Pos	Nat	Player	Apps	Goals	Apps	Goals	Apps	Goals
1	GK	(Czech Republic) CZE	Jiří Pavlenka	8	0	7	0	1	0
2	MF	(Belgium) BEL	Olivier Deman	28	2	15+13	2	0	0
3	DF	(Germany) GER	Anthony Jung	32	1	30+1	1	1	0
4	DF	(Germany) GER	Niklas Stark	19	2	14+4	2	1	0
5	DF	(Germany) GER	Amos Pieper	7	0	6	0	1	0
6	MF	(Denmark) DEN	Jens Stage	30	3	25+4	3	1	0
7	FW	(Germany) GER	Marvin Ducksch	34	13	32+1	12	1	1
8	DF	(Germany) GER	Mitchell Weiser	31	3	30	3	0+1	0
9	FW	(Poland) POL	Dawid Kownacki	21	0	4+17	0	0	0
10	MF	(Germany) GER	Leonardo Bittencourt	30	1	19+10	1	1	0
13	DF	(Serbia) SRB	Miloš Veljković	24	2	21+2	2	1	0
14	MF	(Belgium) BEL	Senne Lynen	32	0	20+12	0	0	0
17	FW	(Germany) GER	Justin Njinmah	24	6	11+13	6	0	0
18	MF	(Guinea) GUI	Naby Keïta	5	0	1+4	0	0	0
19	FW	(Colombia) COL	Rafael Santos Borré	19	4	11+8	4	0	0
20	MF	(Austria) AUT	Romano Schmid	34	4	30+3	4	1	0
21	MF	(Norway) NOR	Isak Hansen-Aarøen	3	0	0+3	0	0	0
22	DF	(Argentina) ARG	Julián Malatini	11	1	6+5	1	0	0
23	MF	(Germany) GER	Nicolai Rapp	3	0	1+1	0	0+1	0
26	FW	(United States) USA	Joel Imasuen	1	0	0+1	0	0	0
27	DF	(Germany) GER	Felix Agu	24	0	19+5	0	0	0
28	MF	(France) FRA	Skelly Alvero	6	1	1+5	1	0	0
29	FW	(Austria) AUT	Nick Woltemade	30	2	12+18	2	0	0
30	GK	(Germany) GER	Michael Zetterer	27	0	27	0	0	0
32	MF	(Austria) AUT	Marco Friedl	26	1	25	1	0+1	0
35	MF	(Germany) GER	Leon Opitz	1	0	0+1	0	0	0
36	MF	(Germany) GER	Christian Groß	21	0	9+11	0	0+1	0
Players away from the club on loan:
24	FW	(Scotland) SCO	Oliver Burke	2	0	0+1	0	1	0
Players who left Werder Bremen during the season:
11	FW	(Germany) GER	Niclas Füllkrug	3	1	2	0	1	1
28	MF	(Bulgaria) BUL	Ilia Gruev	1	0	0+1	0	0	0

=== Goalscorers ===
Rank	Pos.	Nat.	No.	Player	Bundesliga	DFB-Pokal	Total
1	FW	(Germany)	7	Marvin Ducksch	12	1	13
2	FW	(Germany)	17	Justin Njinmah	6	0	6
3	FW	(Colombia)	19	Rafael Santos Borré	4	0	4
3	MF	(Austria)	20	Romano Schmid	4	0	4
5	DF	(Germany)	8	Mitchell Weiser	3	0	3
5	MF	(Denmark)	6	Jens Stage	3	0	3
7	DF	(Germany)	4	Niklas Stark	2	0	2
7	DF	(Serbia)	13	Miloš Veljković	2	0	2
7	FW	(Belgium)	2	Olivier Deman	2	0	2
7	FW	(Germany)	29	Nick Woltemade	2	0	2
11	MF	(Germany)	10	Leonardo Bittencourt	1	0	1
11	DF	(Germany)	4	Niklas Stark	1	0	1
11	DF	(Argentina)	22	Julián Malatini	1	0	1
11	MF	(France)	28	Skelly Alvero	1	0	1
11	DF	(Germany)	3	Anthony Jung	1	0	1
11	MF	(Germany)	28	Marco Friedl	1	0	1
Opponent Own goals					2	0	2
Players who left Werder Bremen during the season:
	FW	(Germany)	11	Niclas Füllkrug	0	1	1
Total					47	2	49

=== Clean sheets ===
Rank	Pos.	Nat.	No.	Player	Bundesliga	DFB-Pokal	Total
1	GK	(Germany)	30	Michael Zetterer	6	0	6
2	GK	(Czech Republic)	1	Jiří Pavlenka	1	0	1
Total					7	0	7

=== Disciplinary record ===
No.	Nat.	Pos.	Player	Bundesliga			DFB-Pokal			Total		
No.	Nat.	Pos.	Player	Yellow card	(yellow card) (yellow-red card)	Red card	Yellow card	(yellow card) (yellow-red card)	Red card	Yellow card	(yellow card) (yellow-red card)	Red card
2	(Belgium)	FW	Olivier Deman	5	0	0	0	0	0	5	0	0
3	(Germany)	DF	Anthony Jung	4	0	1	0	0	0	4	0	1
4	(Germany)	DF	Niklas Stark	4	0	0	0	0	0	4	0	0
5	(Germany)	DF	Amos Pieper	0	0	0	0	0	1	0	0	1
6	(Denmark)	MF	Jens Stage	5	0	1	1	0	0	6	0	1
7	(Germany)	FW	Marvin Ducksch	8	0	0	0	0	0	8	0	0
8	(Germany)	DF	Mitchell Weiser	5	0	0	0	0	0	5	0	0
10	(Germany)	MF	Leonardo Bittencourt	9	0	0	1	0	0	10	0	0
13	(Serbia)	DF	Miloš Veljković	2	0	0	0	0	0	2	0	0
14	(Belgium)	MF	Senne Lynen	6	0	0	0	0	0	6	0	0
17	(Germany)	FW	Justin Njinmah	1	0	0	0	0	0	1	0	0
18	(Guinea)	MF	Naby Keïta	2	0	0	0	0	0	2	0	0
20	(Germany)	MF	Romano Schmid	5	0	0	0	0	0	5	0	0
21	(Norway)	MF	Isak Hansen-Aarøen	1	0	0	0	0	0	1	0	0
22	(Argentina)	DF	Julián Malatini	1	0	0	0	0	0	1	0	0
23	(Germany)	MF	Nicolai Rapp	1	0	0	0	0	0	1	0	0
27	(Germany)	DF	Felix Agu	2	0	0	0	0	0	2	0	0
28	(France)	MF	Skelly Alvaro	1	0	0	0	0	0	1	0	0
29	(Germany)	FW	Nick Woltemade	1	0	0	0	0	0	1	0	0
30	(Germany)	GK	Michael Zetterer	2	0	0	0	0	0	2	0	0
32	(Austria)	DF	Marco Friedl	6	0	0	0	0	0	6	0	0
36	(Germany)	MF	Christian Groß	1	0	0	0	0	0	1	0	0
Total				72	0	2	2	0	1	74	0	3

=== Home attendance ===
Competition	Total	Matches	Average
Bundesliga	708,808	17	41,695
DFB-Pokal	0	0	0
Total	708,808	17	41,695
