= Phillip Tietz =

German footballer (born 1997)

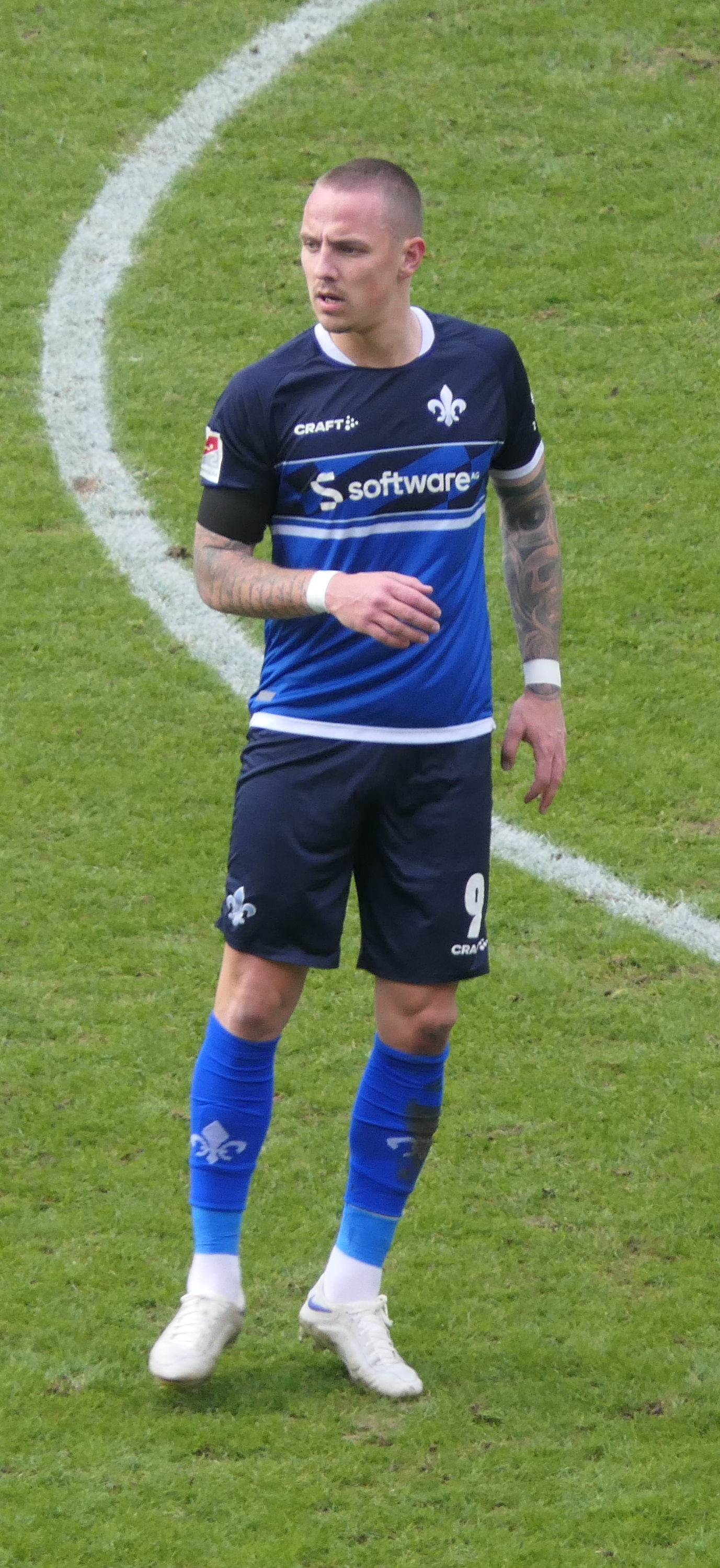
- Tietz playing for Darmstadt 98 in 2023

Personal information
- Date of birth: 9 July 1997 (age 29)
- Place of birth: Braunschweig, Germany
- Height: 1.90 m (6 ft 3 in)
- Position: Forward

Team information
- Current team: Mainz 05
- Number: 9

Youth career
- –2011: JSG Okertal
- 2011–2015: Eintracht Braunschweig

Senior career*
Years	Team	Apps	(Gls)
2015–2018	Eintracht Braunschweig II	39	(15)
2016–2018	Eintracht Braunschweig	12	(1)
2018–2019	SC Paderborn	19	(6)
2018–2019	→ Carl Zeiss Jena (loan)	32	(11)
2019–2021	Wehen Wiesbaden	50	(16)
2021–2023	Darmstadt 98	68	(27)
2023–2026	FC Augsburg	78	(16)
2026–	Mainz 05	25	(10)

International career
2016	Germany U20	2	(0)
- * Club domestic league appearances and goals as of 30 October 2026

Phillip Tietz (born 9 July 1997) is a German professional footballer who plays as a forward for Bundesliga club Mainz 05.

== Career ==
=== Early career ===
Tietz, who grew up across the street from Braunschweig's manager Torsten Lieberknecht in Schwülper, joined the youth setup of Eintracht Braunschweig in 2011.

=== SC Paderborn ===
In February 2016, he made his professional debut for Eintracht's senior side in the 2. Bundesliga, in a match against FSV Frankfurt. He scored his first goal in professional football on 18 March 2016, against 1. FC Union Berlin. On 6 April 2016, Tietz signed his first professional contract with Eintracht Braunschweig.

==== Loan to Carl Zeiss Jena ====
On 14 August 2018, Tietz joined Carl Zeiss Jena on loan until the end of 2018–19 season.

=== Wehen Wiesbaden ===
On 20 June 2019, SV Wehen Wiesbaden announced that they had signed Tietz on a two-year contract.

=== Augsburg ===
On 12 July 2023, Tietz signed a four-year contract with FC Augsburg.

=== Mainz ===
On 2 January 2026, Tietz moved to Mainz 05 on a two-and-a-half-year contract.

== International career ==
On 7 October 2016, Tietz made his debut for the Germany national U-20 team in a match against England.

== Career statistics ==
As of match played 30 October 2026

Appearances and goals by club, season and competition
Club	Season	League			DFB-Pokal		Other		Total	
Club	Season	Division	Apps	Goals	Apps	Goals	Apps	Goals	Apps	Goals
Eintracht Braunschweig	2015–16	2. Bundesliga	8	1	0	0	—		8	1
Eintracht Braunschweig	2016–17	2. Bundesliga	2	0	0	0	1 (Note: Appearance in the Bundesliga play-offs)	0	3	0
Eintracht Braunschweig	2017–18	2. Bundesliga	2	0	0	0	—		2	0
Eintracht Braunschweig	Total		12	1	0	0	1	0	13	1
Eintracht Braunschweig II	2015–16	Regionalliga Nord	2	1	—		—		2	1
Eintracht Braunschweig II	2016–17	Regionalliga Nord	27	10	—		—		27	10
Eintracht Braunschweig II	2017–18	Regionalliga Nord	10	4	—		—		10	4
Eintracht Braunschweig II	Total		39	15	—		—		39	15
SC Paderborn	2017–18	3. Liga	18	6	1	0	—		19	6
SC Paderborn	2018–19	2. Bundesliga	1	0	0	0	—		1	0
SC Paderborn	Total		19	6	1	0	—		20	6
Carl Zeiss Jena (loan)	2018–19	3. Liga	32	11	1	0	—		33	11
Wehen Wiesbaden	2019–20	2. Bundesliga	17	5	0	0	—		17	5
Wehen Wiesbaden	2020–21	3. Liga	33	11	2	1	—		35	12
Wehen Wiesbaden	Total		50	16	2	1	—		52	17
Darmstadt	2021–22	2. Bundesliga	34	15	1	0	—		35	15
Darmstadt	2022–23	2. Bundesliga	34	12	3	2	—		37	14
Darmstadt	Total		68	27	4	2	—		72	29
Augsburg	2023–24	Bundesliga	34	8	1	0	—		35	8
Augsburg	2024–25	Bundesliga	34	7	4	1	—		38	8
Augsburg	2025–26	Bundesliga	10	1	2	0	—		12	1
Augsburg	Total		78	16	7	1	—		85	17
Mainz 05	2025–26	Bundesliga	17	5	—		1 (Note: Appearance in UEFA Conference League)	0	18	5
Mainz 05	2026–27	Bundesliga	8	5	2	4	—		10	9
Mainz 05	Total		25	10	2	4	1	0	28	14
Career total			323	102	17	8	2	0	342	110
