= Ighil Nacer =

Village in Ighram, Béjaïa, Algeria

Ighil Nacer Iɣil Naṣeṛ Ighil Guilef
- Village
- Interactive map of Ighil Nacer
- Location within Algeria
- Coordinates: 36.45890°N 4.49074°E
- Country: Algeria
- Wilaya: Béjaïa
- Commune: Ighram
- Daïra: Akbou
- Elevation: 498 m (1,634 ft)
- Highest elevation: 1,033 m (3,389 ft)
- Lowest elevation: 211 m (692 ft)

Ighil Nacer (Kabylian: Iɣil Naṣeṛ; Tifinagh: ⵉⴴⵉⵍ ⵏⴰⵚⴻⵕ) is a village in the commune of Ighrem, Béjaïa Province, Algeria. It is located near the Soummam Valley, a historically and geographically important area of Kabylia known for its mountainous landscape, villages, agricultural lands, and the Soummam River.

== Geography ==
Ighil Nacer is located in the southeastern side of the Djurdjura mountains near the Soummam Valley. It is bordered by Taslent to the north, Laazib Ulahdir to the south, Tizi Maali to the east, and Irsen to the west. The area has a rugged relief, with an average elevation of 498 m, ranging from 211 m to 1,033 m.

== History ==
Ighil Nacer was formerly known as Ighil Guilef, a kabylian name meaning “the hill of the Barbary wild boar” (Sus scrofa algira).

During the Algerian Revolution, the village was renamed Ighil Nacer in honour of Colonel Mohammedi Saïd, better known as Si Nacer.

The village’s geographical location played an important role during the Algerian War of Independence (1954–1962). Situated on the heights between Irsen and Tizi-Maâli, Ighil Nacer overlooks much of the Ighram area and the Soummam Valley. Its elevated and strategic position made the village and its surrounding terrain valuable to units of the National Liberation Army (ALN), which operated in the region and engaged French forces during military operations and searches.

The village also suffered heavily during the conflict. According to local historical accounts, approximately 90 inhabitants of Ighil Nacer engaged in the ALN and lost their lives during the war, becoming martyrs of Algeria’s struggle for independence. Their memory remains deeply rooted in the village’s collective history and continues to be commemorated during local ceremonies, particularly those held on 20 August, a significant date associated with the Soummam Congress of 1956 and the organization of the Algerian Revolution.

The Battle of Iamorane began near Ighil Nacer on 27 June 1958. Late that day, an armed encounter took place near the village between a French military detachment and fighters of the 1st Company of the Shock Battalion of Wilaya III of the ALN. Although the initial clash caused no casualties, it revealed the presence of an ALN unit in the Ighram area. During the night, French forces mobilized reinforcements and launched a large-scale operation to surround the area. The ALN fighters subsequently took positions on the heights above Iamorane, where the main battle took place the following day, 28 June 1958. The fighting then extended toward Iguervane and the surrounding villages.
