= Paterson Chato =

Congoelse footballer

Personal information
- Full name: Paterson Chato Nguendong
- Date of birth: 1 December 1996 (age 29)
- Place of birth: Goma, Zaire
- Height: 1.86 m (6 ft 1 in)
- Position: Midfielder

Team information
- Current team: SV Rödinghausen
- Number: 6

Youth career
- 2004–2009: Schalke 04
- 2009–2014: Bayer Leverkusen

Senior career*
| Years | Team | Apps | (Gls) |
| 2014–2017 | Bayer Leverkusen | 0 | (0) |
| 2014–2015 | → Energie Cottbus (loan) | 1 | (0) |
| 2014–2015 | → Energie Cottbus II (loan) | 8 | (0) |
| 2015–2017 | → SC Wiedenbrück (loan) | 59 | (6) |
| 2017–2018 | Borussia Dortmund II | 25 | (2) |
| 2018–2019 | Sportfreunde Lotte | 30 | (3) |
| 2019–2021 | Wehen Wiesbaden | 60 | (4) |
| 2021–2022 | Türkgücü München | 23 | (0) |
| 2022–2024 | VfL Osnabrück | 30 | (0) |
| 2024 | Austria Lustenau | 14 | (0) |
| 2024– | SV Rödinghausen | 62 | (5) |
- * Club domestic league appearances and goals as of 24 June 2026

Paterson Chato Nguendong (born 1 December 1996) is a Congolese professional footballer who plays as a midfielder for Regionalliga club SV Rödinghausen.

== Career ==
On 19 January 2024, Chato signed with Austria Lustenau in Austria.
