= Irsen =

Irsen is a masculine given name. Notable people with the name include:

- İrsen Küçük (1940–2013), Turkish Cypriot politician
- Irsen Latifović (born 1969), German footballer
