= Raul Paula =

German footballer (born 2004)

Personal information
- Full name: Raul Carlos Vasko Caldaroska Paula
- Date of birth: 25 January 2004 (age 22)
- Place of birth: Böblingen, Germany
- Height: 1.77 m (5 ft 10 in)
- Position: Midfielder

Team information
- Current team: Wehen Wiesbaden
- Number: 32

Youth career
- VfL Sindelfingen
- TSV Dagersheim
- GSV Maichingen
- –2015: SV Böblingen
- 2015–2023: VfB Stuttgart

Senior career*
Years	Team	Apps	(Gls)
2021–2024	VfB Stuttgart II	48	(16)
2024	VfB Stuttgart	0	(0)
2024–2026	NAC Breda	41	(2)
2026–	Wehen Wiesbaden	0	(0)

International career^{‡}
2019	Germany U16	1	(1)
2020	Germany U17	2	(2)
2021–2022	Germany U18	4	(0)
2024	Germany U20	2	(2)
- * Club domestic league appearances and goals as of 28 August 2026 ‡ National team caps and goals as of 5 September 2024

Raul Carlos Vasko Caldaroska Paula (born 25 January 2004) is a German footballer who plays as a midfielder for 3. Liga club Wehen Wiesbaden. Raul is of Macedonian descent, through his mother.

== Life and career ==
Paula was born on 15 January 2004 in Böblingen, Germany. He is a native of Böblingen, Germany. He was born to a Macedonian mother and a Portuguese father. As a youth player, he joined the youth academy of German side VfL Sindelfingen. After that, he joined the youth academy of German side TSV Dagersheim. After that, he joined the youth academy of German side GSV Maichingen. After that, he joined the youth academy of German side SV Böblingen. In 2015, he joined the youth academy of German side VfB Stuttgart. He started his senior career with the club. He was described as "one of the most dangerous players that VfB... produced in recent years". In 2024, he signed for Dutch side NAC Breda.

Paula was a Germany youth international. He has played for the Germany national under-16 football team, the Germany national under-17 football team, and the Germany national under-18 football team.

He made one appearance and scored one goals while playing for the Germany national under-16 football team. He made two appearances and scored two goals while playing for the Germany national under-17 football team. He made four appearances and scored one goal while playing for the Germany national under-18 football team. He is eligible to represent North Macedonia and Portugal internationally through his parents.
