= Irsen Latifović =

German footballer

Personal information
- Date of birth: 28 December 1969 (age 56)
- Place of birth: Freiburg, West Germany
- Height: 1.79 m (5 ft 10 in)
- Position: Forward

Youth career
- 1987–1989: VfB Stuttgart

Senior career*
Years	Team	Apps	(Gls)
1989–1990	VfB Stuttgart	0	(0)
1989–1990	→ VfB Stuttgart II		
1992–1993	SV Böblingen		
1993–1994	Hansa Rostock	5	(1)
1994–1995	Holstein Kiel		
1995–1996	Novi Pazar		
1996–1997	Napredak Kruševac		
1999–2000	TSF Ditzingen	8	(3)
2000–2001	SV Böblingen		
2002–2003	SV Böblingen		
- * Club domestic league appearances and goals

Irsen Latifović (born 28 December 1969) is a German retired footballer who played as a forward.

== Career ==
Born in Freiburg im Breisgau in West Germany, Latifović started playing in the youth and reserves teams of VfB Stuttgart. He then played with SV Böblingen before joining FC Hansa Rostock and playing with them in the 1993–94 2. Bundesliga. Next he moved to Holstein Kiel where he spend the next season, before spending two seasons abroad, in Serbia, first playing with FK Novi Pazar in the 1995–96 Second League of FR Yugoslavia, and then, with FK Napredak Kruševac in the 1996–97 Second League of FR Yugoslavia. In 1999, he was back in Germany playing with TSF Ditzingen, followed by two seasons, 2000–01 and 2002–03, spent with his former club, SV Böblingen.
