= Marcus Müller =

German footballer (born 2004)

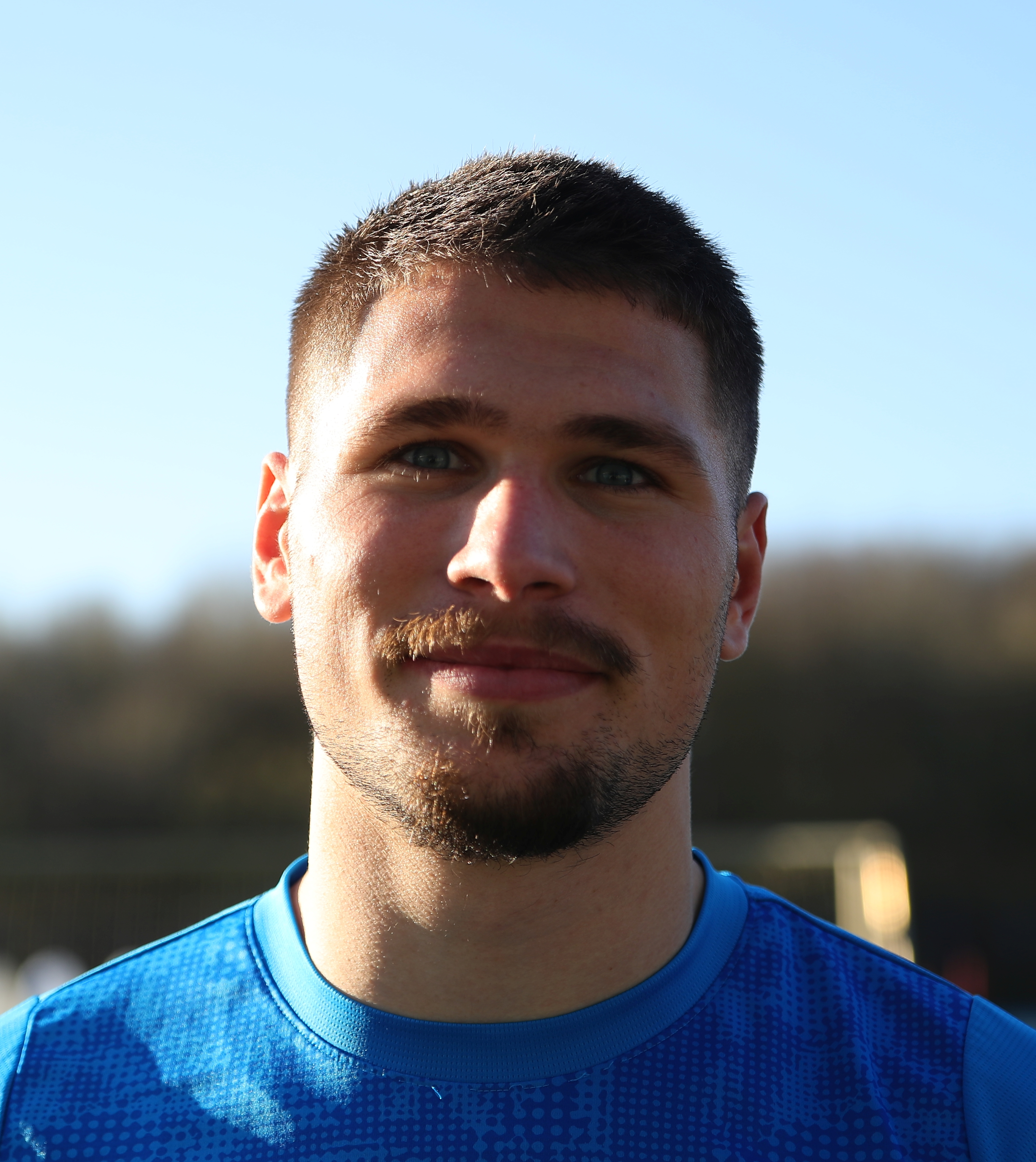
- Müller in 2026

Personal information
- Date of birth: 20 August 2002 (age 24)
- Place of birth: Augsburg, Germany
- Height: 1.88 m (6 ft 2 in)
- Position: Striker

Team information
- Current team: Wehen Wiesbaden (on loan from Holstein Kiel)
- Number: 21

Youth career
- 2015–2016: FC Augsburg
- 2016–2018: FC Königsbrunn
- 2018–2019: TSV Schwabmünchen
- 2019–2020: FC Augsburg

Senior career*
| Years | Team | Apps | (Gls) |
| 2020–2023 | FC Augsburg II | 56 | (15) |
| 2023–2024 | Mainz 05 II | 28 | (11) |
| 2023–2024 | Mainz 05 | 1 | (0) |
| 2024–2025 | VfL Osnabrück | 30 | (3) |
| 2025– | Holstein Kiel | 23 | (1) |
| 2026– | → Wehen Wiesbaden (loan) | 1 | (0) |
- * Club domestic league appearances and goals as of 29 August 2026

Marcus Müller (born 20 August 2002) is a German professional footballer who plays as a striker for 3. Liga club Wehen Wiesbaden, on loan from Holstein Kiel.

== Career ==
Müller is a youth product of FC Augsburg, FC Königsbrunn, and TSV Schwabmünchen.

He began his senior career with FC Augsburg II in the Regionalliga in 2020.

On 20 May 2023, he transferred to Mainz 05 where he was originally assigned to their reserves. He made his professional debut with the senior Mainz team as a late substitute in a 1–0 Bundesliga loss to 1. FC Heidenheim on 16 December 2023.

On 14 August 2024, Müller signed with VfL Osnabrück in 3. Liga.

On 17 June 2025, Müller signed a three-year contract with 2. Bundesliga club Holstein Kiel.
