= Brita-Arena =

Football stadium in Wiesbaden, Germany

BRITA-Arena
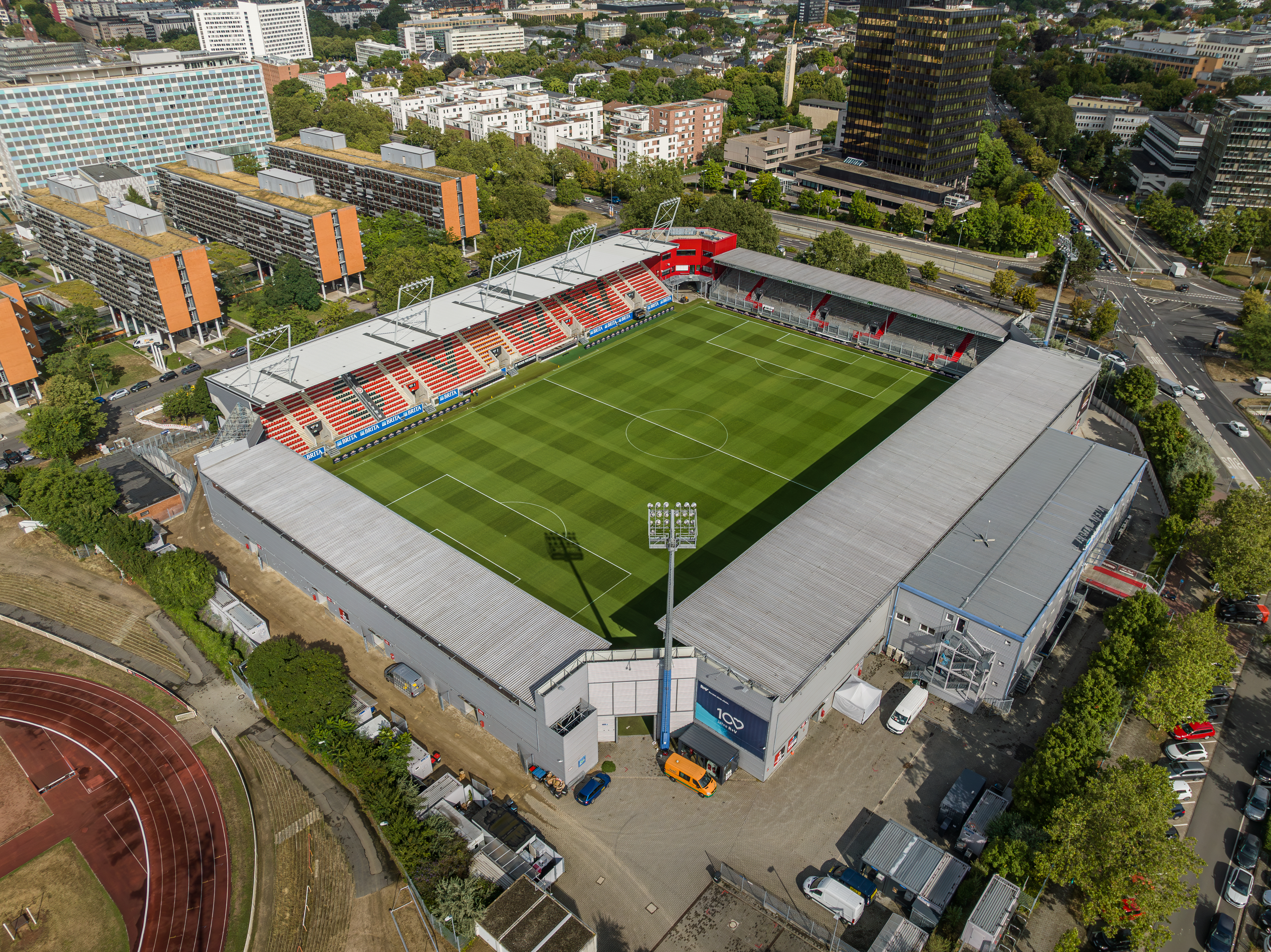
- Interactive map of BRITA-Arena
- Location: Wiesbaden, Germany
- Coordinates: 50°04′17″N 8°15′24″E
- Operator: Stadion Berliner Straße GmbH & Co. KG
- Capacity: 15,295
- Surface: Grass

Construction
- Opened: 11 October 2007
- Cost: €14,000,000

Tenant
- SV Wehen Wiesbaden

Website
- www.brita-arena.de

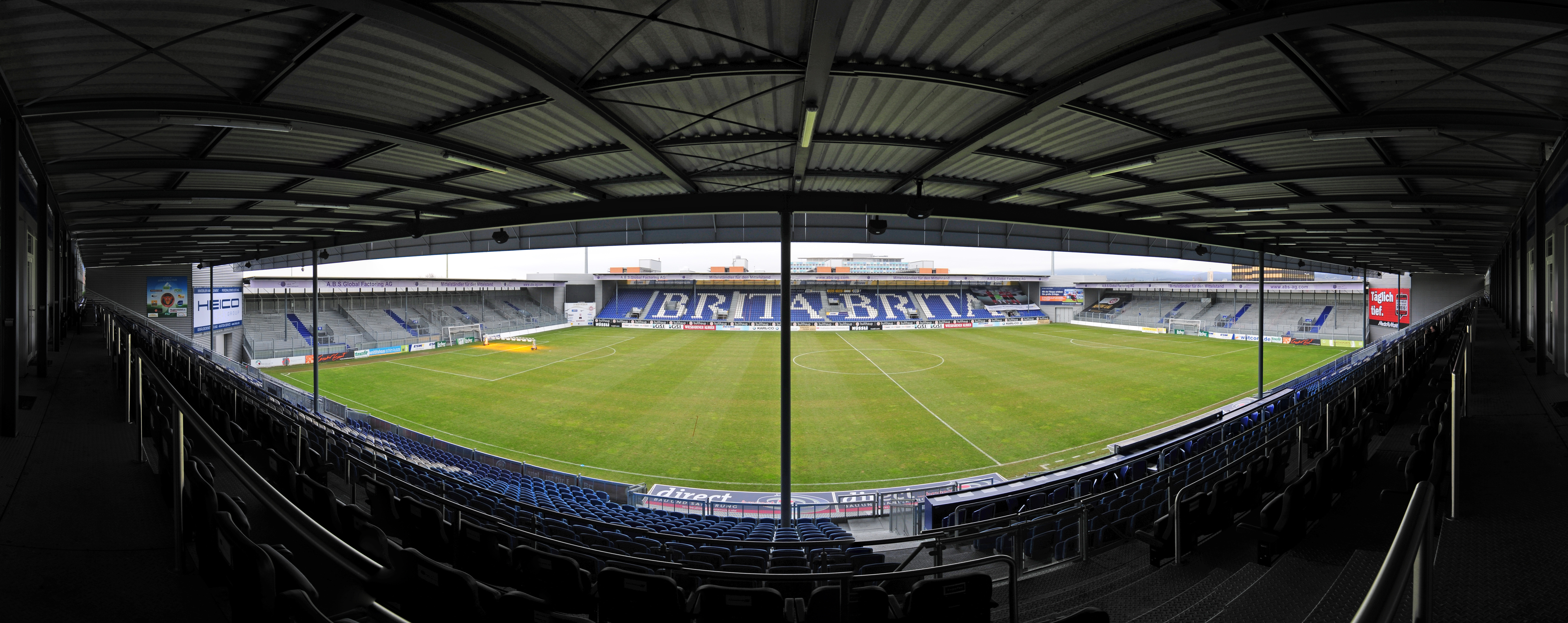
A panorama picture of the BRITA-Arena.

BRITA-Arena is a football stadium in Wiesbaden, Germany. It is the home ground of 3. Liga (relegated from the 2. Bundesliga, 2024) side SV Wehen Wiesbaden. In European competitions, the stadium is known as SV Wehen Wiesbaden Arena due to advertising rules.

The stadium is named after its former main sponsor Brita, a German company specialised in producing water filters, and replaced the Stadion am Halberg in Taunusstein as SV Wehen's home ground. The stadium has a total capacity of 15,295 seats.

BRITA-Arena opened on 11 October, 2007 with a friendly match which SV Wehen lost 2–1 to Borussia Dortmund. The first competitive match in the stadium was played on 21 October 2007 between SV Wehen and 1. FSV Mainz 05, with Mainz celebrating a 3–1 victory.

== West stand reconstruction ==
After the home game of SV Wehen Wiesbaden against 1860 Munich on 9 March 2019, the West stand of the stadium was closed in order to enable reconstruction to start. Prior to this, tubular steel construction stand was a temporary structure while the new structure will be permanent.

Due to the temporary nature, the limited capacity of the stadium, and other requirements regarding TV camera positions, SV Wehen will require a special permit if they are promoted to the 2. Bundesliga. Therefore, the rebuilding of a permanent west stand structure was planned and started and the new stand is due to be completed and open by the end of 2020.

In February 2018 an agreement was reached between the Stadion Berliner Strasse GmbH & Co. KG (SBS) and the city of Wiesbaden on a new licence. As a result, SV Wehen Wiesbaden will play its games in the Brita Arena until 2047. The new west stand, which will be built from concrete, will cost between eight and nine million euros, with the state of Hesse contributing 3.5 million euros.

Until the building has been completed there is only room for 9,100 spectators.

== See also ==
- List of football stadiums in Germany
- Lists of stadiums
