= Skelly Alvero =

French footballer (born 2002)

Personal information
- Date of birth: 4 May 2002 (age 24)
- Place of birth: Stains, France
- Height: 2.02 m (6 ft 8 in)
- Position: Midfielder

Team information
- Current team: Werder Bremen
- Number: 28

Youth career
- Red Star
- 2017–2020: Sochaux

Senior career*
Years	Team	Apps	(Gls)
2020–2022	Sochaux II	24	(2)
2021–2023	Sochaux	31	(2)
2023–2024	Lyon	8	(1)
2023–2024	Lyon II	1	(0)
2024	→ Werder Bremen (loan)	6	(1)
2024–	Werder Bremen	14	(0)
2026	→ Amiens (loan)	8	(0)
- * Club domestic league appearances and goals as of 1 July 2026

Skelly Alvero (born 4 May 2002) is a French professional footballer who plays as a midfielder for Bundesliga club Werder Bremen.

== Career ==
A youth product of Red Star, Alvero moved to the Sochaux youth academy on 25 May 2017. He began his senior career with the Sochaux reserves in 2020. He debuted with the senior Sochaux squad as a late substitute in a 3–0 Coupe de France win over Bresse Jura Foot on 13 November 2021. He signed his first professional contract for three seasons on 18 February 2022.

On 4 July 2023, Alvero left Sochaux to sign a five-year contract with Ligue 1 side Lyon. He scored his first goal in Ligue 1 on 5 November 2023 against FC Metz.

On 31 January 2024, Alvero joined Bundesliga side Werder Bremen on a loan deal until the end of the season, with an option to buy included. Lyon disclosed the loan fee as €250,000 plus a potential €100,000 in bonuses and the purchase fee as up to €6.25 million. After five substitute appearances he made his starting debut for Werder Bremen on 30 March 2024, in a 2–0 loss against VfL Wolfsburg, playing 79 minutes before being substituted. Werder exercised its option and signed Alvero to a permanent deal on 10 June 2024.

On 2 February 2026, Alvero moved on loan to Amiens in Ligue 2.

== Personal life ==
Skelly Alvero was born in Stains, in the northern suburbs of Paris. He holds French, Angolan, Malagasy citizenship.

== Career statistics ==
As of match played 1 July 2026

Appearances and goals by club, season and competition
Club	Season	League			National cup		Europe		Total	
Club	Season	Division	Apps	Goals	Apps	Goals	Apps	Goals	Apps	Goals
Sochaux B	2020–21	N3 - Bourgogne	3	0	—		—		3	0
Sochaux B	2021–22	N3 - Bourgogne	21	2	—		—		21	2
Sochaux B	Total		24	2	—		—		24	2
Sochaux	2022–23	Ligue 2	31	2	2	0	—		33	2
Lyon	2023–24	Ligue 1	8	1	0	0	—		8	1
Lyon II	2023–24	N3 - Group K	1	0	–		—		1	0
Werder Bremen (loan)	2023–24	Bundesliga	6	1	–		—		6	1
Werder Bremen	2024–25	Bundesliga	12	0	0	0	–		12	0
Werder Bremen	2025–26	Bundesliga	2	0	0	0	–		2	0
Werder Bremen	2026–27	Bundesliga	0	0	0	0	–		0	0
Werder Bremen	Total		14	0	0	0	–		14	0
Amiens (loan)	2025–26	Ligue 2	8	0	–		—		8	0
Career total			92	6	2	0	0	0	94	6
