= Donny Bogićević =

German footballer

Personal information
- Date of birth: 8 October 2001 (age 25)
- Place of birth: Giessen, Germany
- Height: 1.86 m (6 ft 1 in)
- Position: Midfielder

Team information
- Current team: Wehen Wiesbaden
- Number: 8

Youth career
- VfB 1900 Gießen
- –2018: TSG Wieseck
- 2018–2020: Rot-Weiß Erfurt

Senior career*
Years	Team	Apps	(Gls)
2020–2021	Rot-Weiß Erfurt	5	(1)
2021–2022	FC Gießen	20	(6)
2021	FC Gießen II	2	(1)
2022–2023	TSV Steinbach Haiger	14	(5)
2023–2025	Viktoria Köln	33	(5)
2025–	Wehen Wiesbaden	31	(2)
- * Club domestic league appearances and goals as of 29 May 2026

Donny Bogićević (born 8 October 2001) is a German professional footballer who plays as a midfielder for 3. Liga club Wehen Wiesbaden.

== Career ==
On 28 May 2025, Bogićević signed a two-season contract with Wehen Wiesbaden.
