= SV Böblingen =

German football club

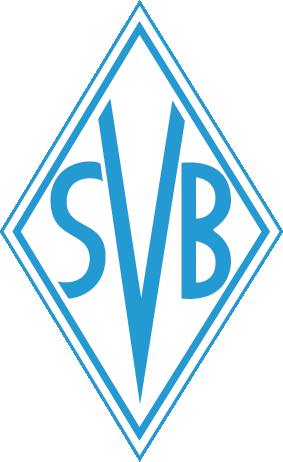
- Full name: Sportvereinigung Böblingen
- Founded: 20 October 1945
- League: Landesliga Württemberg (VII)
- 2015–16: Verbandsliga Württemberg (VI), 14th (relegated)

Sportvereiningung Böblingen, better known as SV Böblingen or SVB, is a German association football club from Böblingen, Baden-Württemberg and is part of the largest sports club in that town with more than 7,000 members in 25 other departments.

== History ==
SVB was established on 20 October 1945 and their first success was promotion to the 2. Amateurliga Württemberg (IV) in 1955 as A-Klasse Stuttgart (V) champions. The club won a 2. Amateurliga title in 1964 and moved up to the 1. Amateurliga Nordwürttemberg (III) from which it was relegated in 1969. They subsequently bounced around between the 2. Amateurliga and the A-Klasse until 1978 when they went up to the new Landesliga Württemberg 3 (V). They clinched their Landesliga division in 1984 and made their return to the Verbandsliga (IV).

In 1989 SVB was dropped from the Verbandsliga, but came back two years later after earning another Landesliga crown. On 8 May 1990 they played a friendly against FC Bayern Munich and lost to the Bavarians 1–2 after leading 1–0 at half time. Bayern goalkeeper Sven Scheuer, who formerly spent his youth career with the losing team, was in that game. As historic firsts for the club, they made the final of the 1993 Württemberg Cup but wound up losing finalists to TSF Ditzingen 2–3, but as cup runners-up they qualified for and made their debut in the 1993–94 DFB-Pokal where they were pounded by MSV Duisburg in the first round at home 0–5.

SVB made their Oberliga Baden-Württemberg (IV) debut in 1996 via their first Verbandsliga (V) trophy and dropped from that league in 1999, slipping further to the Landesliga (VI) in 2006. However they started another Verbandsliga (VI) tenure in 2011 by winning their division in the seventh-tier (since 2008) Landesliga.

The club was relegated from the Verbandsliga at the end of the 2015–16 season.

== Honors ==
- Verbandsliga Württemberg
  - Winners: 1996
- Landesliga Württemberg
  - Winners: 1984, 1991, 2011
- 2. Amateurliga Württemberg
  - Winners: 1964
- A-Klasse Stuttgart
  - Winners: 1955
- Württemberg Cup
  - Runners-up: 1993
