= SV Wehen Wiesbaden =

German football club

- Full name: Sportverein Wehen 1926 – Taunusstein e. V. (organisation); Sportverein Wehen 1926 Wiesbaden GmbH (company)
- Founded: 1 January 1926; 100 years ago
- Ground: BRITA-Arena
- Capacity: 13,500
- Chairman: Markus Hankammer
- Manager: Jochen Seitz
- League: 3. Liga
- 2025–26: 3. Liga, 9th of 20
- Website: https://svww.de/
Home colours	Away colours

SV Wehen Wiesbaden is a German association football club based in Wiesbaden, Hesse. The club was previously known as SV Wehen but added Wiesbaden to its name during the summer of 2007. They left their previous ground, the Taunusstein, that same summer and have played at the BRITA-Arena ever since.

== Amateur Football (1926–1994) ==
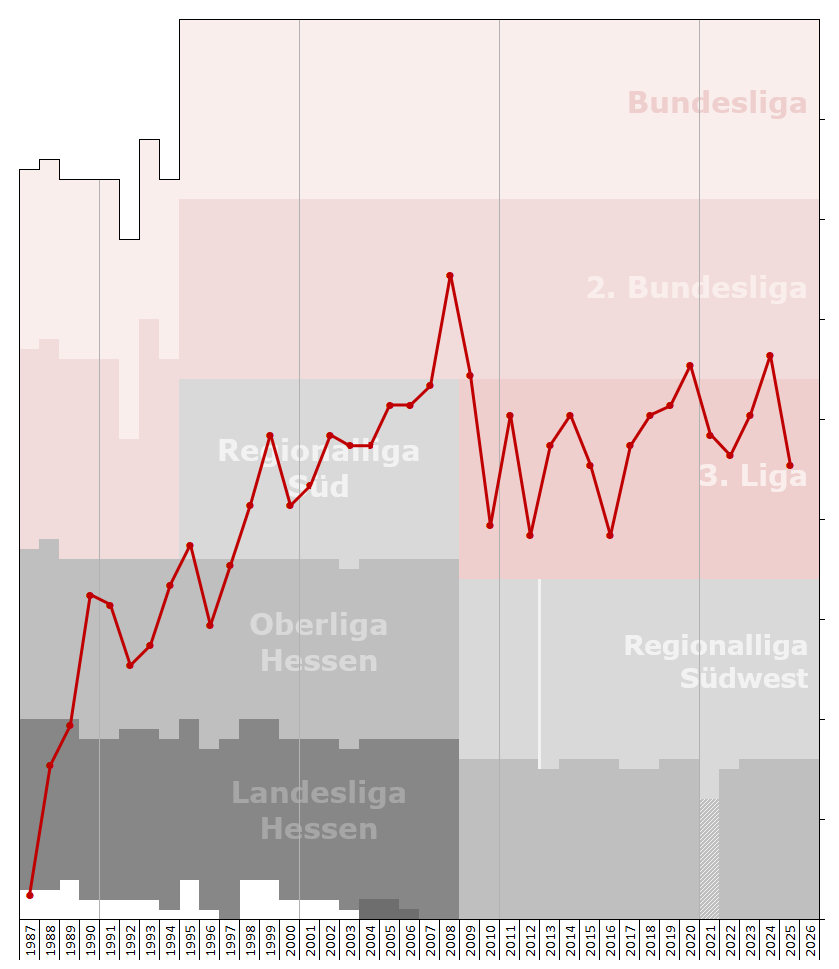
Historical chart of Wehen Wiesbaden league performance

The club was founded under the name of SV Wehen 1926 – Taunusstein in 1926 and disbanded by the Nazi government in 1933, although the football department was maintained by playing occasional friendly matches until 1939. The club re-established itself in 1946, following World War II. They operated both first and reserve teams from the beginning, with their first team competing in local amateur division, the B-Klasse Wiesbaden. The club's first youth team was established in 1955 and they subsequently started to use their own talented young players to strengthen the first team. By the mid-1970s, the youth department was split in ten teams with more than 150 players and a women's team was first established in 1984. Wehen won the Hessenpokal in 1988, 1996 and 2000, which gave them berths in the German Cup in those years.

== Third Tier and upwards (1994–) ==
Crest of SV Wehen Taunusstein

In 1994, the third tier of German football underwent a reform which resulted in the elevation of the Regionalliga. Wehen had finished seventh in the Oberliga Hessen in the previous year and thus became a founding member of the Regionalliga Süd. In spite of its relegation in 1995, the club managed to establish itself in the newly founded league over the next ten years.

At the end of the 2006–07 season, Wehen finished first and earned promotion to the 2.Bundesliga. Its first second-tier season saw the club finish eighth and the inauguration of its current home, Brita-Arena. In spite of a berth in the DFB Pokal quarterfinals, Wehen was relegated to the 3. Liga in 2009, which would remain the club's division for the next ten seasons.

Wehen achieved a third-place finish at the end of the 2018–19 season and thereby qualified for the promotion playoffs to the 2.Bundesliga against FC Ingolstadt. After a 1–2 defeat in their home game, the team managed to carry a 3–2 victory on Ingolstadt's turf. Advancing on away goals, Wehen was promoted to the 2. Bundesliga for only the second time in club history. However, the club experienced a difficult 2019–20 season and finished in 17th place, fielding the league's worst defence with 65 goals conceded. Along with Dynamo Dresden, Wehen were relegated after just one season in the second tier.

On 6 June 2023, Wehen Wiesbaden secured promotion to 2. Bundesliga from 2023 to 2024 after defeating Arminia Bielefeld on aggregate 6–1 in the promotion/relegation play-off matches and returned to the second tier after three years absence.

== Honours ==
=== League ===
- Regionalliga Süd (III)
  - Champions: 2007
- Oberliga Hessen (IV)
  - Champions: 1997
- Landesliga Hessen-Mitte (IV)
  - Champions: 1989

=== Cup ===
- Hesse Cup (Tiers III–VII)
  - Winners: 1988, 1996, 2000, 2011, 2017, 2019, 2021, 2025, 2026
  - Runners-up: 1992, 2001, 2003, 2013, 2016

== Fans ==
At the beginning of the 2007/08 season, SV Wehen Wiesbaden's first year of professional football, the club only had two official fan clubs: the Halbergtramps and the Psychopathen Wehen 1999. SV Wehen Wiesbaden currently has 15 official fan clubs.

The active fan scene maintains a fan friendship with fans of FC Ingolstadt 04.

== Players ==
=== Current squad ===
As of 3 September 2026

Note: Flags indicate national team as defined under FIFA eligibility rules; some limited exceptions apply. Players may hold more than one non-FIFA nationality.

No.	Pos.	Nation	Player
5	DF	GER	Niklas May
6	MF	GER	Gino Fechner
7	MF	GER	Lukas Schleimer
8	MF	GER	Donny Bogićević
9	FW	GER	Simon Stehle
10	FW	GER	Robin Kalem
11	MF	TUR	Tarik Gözüsirin
14	DF	GER	Michael Schultz
15	DF	GER	Justin Janitzek
16	GK	GER	Florian Stritzel
17	DF	GER	Ben Nink
18	MF	GER	Fabian Greilinger
19	DF	GER	Florian Hübner (captain)
20	MF	MAR	Ayoub Chaikhoun (on loan from 1. FC Nürnberg)

No.	Pos.	Nation	Player
21	FW	GER	Marcus Müller (on loan from Holstein Kiel)
22	FW	GER	Roberto Massimo (on loan from Górnik Zabrze)
24	DF	GER	Tim Neubert
27	DF	BEL	Jordy Gillekens
28	MF	GER	Moritz Flotho
29	DF	GER	Philipp Hercher
30	MF	GER	Sinan Karweina
31	GK	GER	Noah Brdar
32	MF	GER	Raul Paula
37	MF	GER	Max Brandt
41	GK	GER	Finn Ludwig
45	MF	MAR	Ibrahim Ati Allah
47	MF	ESP	David Suárez

=== Out on loan ===
Note: Flags indicate national team as defined under FIFA eligibility rules; some limited exceptions apply. Players may hold more than one non-FIFA nationality.

No.	Pos.	Nation	Player
—	FW	GER	Jan Becker (at Kickers Offenbach until 30 June 2027)

== Recent managers ==
Recent managers of the club:

Manager	Start	Finish
Manfred Petz	1 July 1997	12 May 1998
Bruno Hübner	12 May 1998	30 June 1998
Martin Hohmann	1 July 1998	30 October 1998
Werner Orf	1 November 1999	6 May 2000
Gerd Schwickert	7 May 2000	3 November 2002
Djuradj Vasic	4 November 2002	16 October 2006
Christian Hock	17 October 2006	30 June 2007
Djuradj Vasic	2 July 2007	20 August 2007
Christian Hock	21 August 2007	17 December 2008
Wolfgang Frank	19 December 2008	23 March 2009
Hans Werner Moser	24 March 2009	9 February 2010
Gino Lettieri	10 February 2010	15 February 2012
Peter Vollmann	February 2012	21 October 2013
Marc Kienle	28 October 2013	12 April 2015
Christian Hock	12 April 2015	30 June 2015
Sven Demandt	1 July 2015	7 March 2016
Torsten Fröhling	14 March 2016	6 February 2017
Rüdiger Rehm	13 February 2017	25 October 2021
Mike Krannich/Nils Döring	25 October 2021	8 November 2021
Markus Kauczinski	8 November 2021	28 April 2024
Nils Döring	28 April 2024	25 October 2025
Frank Steinmetz	25 October 2025	10 November 2025
Daniel Scherning	10 November 2025	14 September 2026
Frank Steinmetz / Giuliano Modica	14 September 2026	23 September 2026
Jochen Seitz	23 September 2026	Present

== Recent seasons ==
The recent season-by-season performance of the club:

Season	Division	Tier	Position
1999–2000	Regionalliga Süd	III	13th
2000–01	Regionalliga Süd	III	11th
2001–02	Regionalliga Süd	III	6th
2002–03	Regionalliga Süd	III	7th
2003–04	Regionalliga Süd	III	7th
2004–05	Regionalliga Süd	III	3rd
2005–06	Regionalliga Süd	III	3rd
2006–07	Regionalliga Süd	III	1st ↑
2007–08	2. Bundesliga	II	8th
2008–09	2. Bundesliga	II	18th ↓
2009–10	3. Liga	III	15th
2010–11	3. Liga	III	4th
2011–12	3. Liga	III	16th
2012–13	3. Liga	III	7th
2013–14	3. Liga	III	4th
2014–15	3. Liga	III	9th
2015–16	3. Liga	III	16th
2016–17	3. Liga	III	7th
2017–18	3. Liga	III	4th
2018–19	3. Liga	III	3rd ↑
2019–20	2. Bundesliga	II	17th ↓
2020–21	3. Liga	III	6th
2021–22	3. Liga	III	8th
2022–23	3. Liga	III	4th ↑
2023–24	2. Bundesliga	II	16th ↓
2024–25	3. Liga	III	9th
2025–26	3. Liga	III	9th
2026–27		III	

- With the introduction of the Regionalligas in 1994 and the 3. Liga in 2008 as the new third tier, below the 2. Bundesliga, all leagues below dropped one tier.

Key

↑Promoted	↓ Relegated
