= 2019–20 1. FC Köln season =

1. FC Köln
2019–20 season
- Managing Director: Armin Veh
- Manager: Markus Gisdol
- Stadium: RheinEnergieStadion
- Bundesliga: 14th
- DFB-Pokal: Second round
- Top goalscorer: League: Jhon Córdoba (13); All: Jhon Córdoba (14)
Home colours	Away colours	Third colours

The 2019–20 1. FC Köln season was the 72nd season in the football club's history and first consecutive and 48th overall season in the top flight of German football, the Bundesliga, having been promoted from the 2. Bundesliga in 2019. 1. FC Köln participated in this season's edition of the domestic cup, the DFB-Pokal. Köln were the reigning 2. Bundesliga champions. This was the 72nd season for Köln in the Müngersdorfer Stadion, located in Cologne, North Rhine-Westphalia, Germany. The season covered a period from 1 July 2019 to 30 June 2020.

Achim Beierlorzer was sacked on 9 November 2019 after posting a 2–1–8 record in the first eleven matches of the season, sitting in 17th place in the Bundesliga. He was replaced by former Hamburger SV manager Markus Gisdol on 18 November 2019. On 1 May 2020, three players from the team tested positive for COVID-19, and said that they will not confirm the three players.

== Players ==
=== Squad information ===
As of 31 January 2020

Note: Flags indicate national team as defined under FIFA eligibility rules; some limited exceptions apply. Players may hold more than one non-FIFA nationality.

No.	Pos.	Nation	Player
1	GK	GER	Timo Horn
2	DF	GER	Benno Schmitz
5	DF	GER	Rafael Czichos
6	MF	GER	Marco Höger
7	MF	GER	Marcel Risse
8	MF	BEL	Birger Verstraete
9	FW	GER	Simon Terodde
11	FW	GHA	Kingsley Schindler
14	DF	GER	Jonas Hector (Captain)
15	FW	COL	Jhon Córdoba
17	MF	GER	Christian Clemens
18	GK	GER	Thomas Kessler
19	DF	NED	Kingsley Ehizibue
20	MF	KOS	Elvis Rexhbeçaj (on loan from VfL Wolfsburg)

No.	Pos.	Nation	Player
22	DF	ESP	Jorge Meré
23	FW	GER	Mark Uth (on loan from Schalke 04)
24	MF	GER	Dominick Drexler
27	FW	FRA	Anthony Modeste
28	MF	TUN	Ellyes Skhiri
29	FW	GER	Jan Thielmann
30	MF	AUT	Florian Kainz
31	GK	USA	Brady Scott
32	GK	GER	Julian Krahl
33	DF	BEL	Sebastiaan Bornauw
34	DF	GER	Noah Katterbach
36	MF	GER	Niklas Hauptmann
37	DF	GER	Toni Leistner (on loan from Queens Park Rangers)
38	DF	GER	Ismail Jakobs

== Transfers ==
=== Transfers in ===
#	Position	Player	Transferred from	Fee	Date	Source
11	MF	(Ghana) Kingsley Schindler	(Germany) Holstein Kiel	Free	16 January 2019	
32	GK	(Germany) Julian Krahl	(Germany) RB Leipzig	Free	15 May 2019	
19	DF	(Netherlands) Kingsley Ehizibue	(Netherlands) PEC Zwolle	Undisclosed	31 May 2019	
8	MF	(Belgium) Birger Verstraete	(Belgium) Gent	Undisclosed	17 June 2019	
33	DF	(Belgium) Sebastiaan Bornauw	(Belgium) Anderlecht	Undisclosed	6 August 2019	

=== Transfers out ===
#	Position	Player	Transferred to	Fee	Date	Source
	FW	(France) Serhou Guirassy	(France) Amiens	€5,000,000	24 May 2019	
28	GK	(Germany) Jan-Christoph Bartels	(Germany) SV Wehen Wiesbaden	Undisclosed	19 June 2019	

== Friendly matches ==
Win Draw Loss

26 July 2019 Friendly	1. FC Köln	3–1	Bologna	Kufstein, Austria
18:00 CEST (UTC+2)	Kainz 11', 22'; Churlinov 71'	Report	Orsolini 85'	Stadium: Kufstein-Arena; Referee: Patrick Elsler (Austria)

28 July 2019 Friendly	1. FC Köln	1–3	Villarreal	Kufstein, Austria
18:15 CEST (UTC+2)	Terodde 2' (pen.)	Report	Iborra (yellow card) 33'; Funes Mori 41'; Gerard 48'; Costa (yellow card) 59'; Bacca 75'	Stadium: Kufstein-Arena; Referee: Andreas Heiß (Austria)

3 August 2019 Friendly	Southampton	2–0	1. FC Köln	Southampton, England
16:00 CEST (UTC+2)	Ings 5' (pen.); Højbjerg 53'	Report		Stadium: St Mary's Stadium; Attendance: 14,871; Referee: Jonathan Moss (England)

7 January 2020 Friendly	1. FC Köln	1–2	Sporting Charleroi	Benidorm, Spain
12:00 CET (UTC+1)	Lemperle 67'	Report	Gholizadeh 21'; Rezaei 52'; Busi (yellow card) 59'; Núrio (yellow card) 81'	Stadium: Estadio Municipal Guillermo Amor

7 January 2020 Friendly	KV Mechelen	2–2	1. FC Köln	Benidorm, Spain
15:30 CET (UTC+1)	Swinkels 32'; Bateau (yellow card) 45'; Togui 60'; Van Damme (yellow card) 65'; Vranckx (yellow card) 82'	Report	Katterbach (yellow card) 30'; Uth 55'; Skhiri 75'	Stadium: Campo 2 Benidorm

10 January 2020 Friendly	1. FC Köln	1–1	Genk	Benidorm, Spain
14:00 CET (UTC+1)	Jakobs 60'	Report	Bongonda 72'	Stadium: Estadio Municipal Guillermo Amor

== Competitions ==
Win Draw Loss

=== Overview ===
Competition	First match	Last match	Starting round	Final position	Record							
Competition	First match	Last match	Starting round	Final position	Pld	W	D	L	GF	GA	GD	Win %
Bundesliga	17 August 2019	27 June 2020	Matchday 1	14th	34	10	6	18	51	69	−18	29.41
DFB-Pokal	11 August 2019	29 October 2019	First round	Second round	2	0	1	1	5	6	−1	0.00
Total					36	10	7	19	56	75	−19	27.78

Last updated: 27 June 2020.
Source: Competitions

=== Bundesliga ===
==== League table ====
Pos	Team	Pld	W	D	L	GF	GA	GD	Pts	Qualification or relegation
12	Schalke 04	34	9	12	13	38	58	−20	39	
13	Mainz 05	34	11	4	19	44	65	−21	37	
14	1. FC Köln	34	10	6	18	51	69	−18	36	
15	FC Augsburg	34	9	9	16	45	63	−18	36	
16	Werder Bremen (O)	34	8	7	19	42	69	−27	31	Qualification for the relegation play-offs

Source: DFB
Rules for classification: 1) Points; 2) Goal difference; 3) Goals scored; 4) Head-to-head results; 5) Head-to-head away goals scored; 6) Away goals scored; 7) Play-off.
(O) Play-off winners

==== Results summary ====
Overall								Home						Away					
Pld	W	D	L	GF	GA	GD	Pts	W	D	L	GF	GA	GD	W	D	L	GF	GA	GD
34	10	6	18	51	69	−18	36	6	4	7	28	27	+1	4	2	11	23	42	−19

Last updated: 27 June 2020.
Source: Bundesliga

==== Results by round ====
Round	1	2	3	4	5	6	7	8	9	10	11	12	13	14	15	16	17	18	19	20	21	22	23	24	25	26	27	28	29	30	31	32	33	34
Ground	A	H	A	H	A	H	A	H	A	A	H	A	H	A	H	A	H	H	A	H	A	H	A	H	A	H	H	A	H	A	H	A	H	A
Result	L	L	W	L	L	L	D	W	L	L	L	L	D	L	W	W	W	W	L	W	L	L	W	W	W	D	D	L	L	D	L	L	D	L
Position	13	15	14	15	16	17	17	15	16	17	17	17	17	18	17	15	15	13	14	13	14	14	13	11	10	10	10	11	12	12	12	13	14	14

Updated to match(es) played on 27 June 2020. Source: DFB
A = Away; H = Home; W = Win; D = Draw; L = Loss

==== Matches ====
The Bundesliga schedule was announced on 28 June 2019.

17 August 2019 1	VfL Wolfsburg	2–1	1. FC Köln	Wolfsburg
15:30 CEST (UTC+2)	Arnold 16'; Weghorst 60'; Steffen (yellow card) 75'	Report	Höger (yellow card) 26'; Drexler (yellow card) 49'; Terodde 90+1'; Meré (yellow card) 90+2'	Stadium: Volkswagen Arena; Attendance: 25,099; Referee: Sven Jablonski

23 August 2019 2	1. FC Köln	1–3	Borussia Dortmund	Cologne
20:30 CEST (UTC+2)	Drexler 29'; Verstraete (yellow card) 45+1'; Ehizibue (yellow card) 90'	Report	Piszczek (yellow card) 58'; Sancho 70'; Hakimi 86'; Alcácer 90+4'	Stadium: RheinEnergieStadion; Attendance: 50,000; Referee: Christian Dingert

31 August 2019 3	SC Freiburg	1–2	1. FC Köln	Freiburg
15:30 CEST (UTC+2)	Czichos 40' (o.g.)	Report	Hector (yellow card) 43'; Modeste 52'; Meré (yellow card) 54'; Skhiri 90+2'	Stadium: Schwarzwald-Stadion; Attendance: 24,000; Referee: Robert Kampka

14 September 2019 4	1. FC Köln	0–1	Borussia Mönchengladbach	Cologne
15:30 CEST (UTC+2)	Hector (yellow card) 20'; Risse (yellow card) 89'	Report	Pléa 14'; Kramer (yellow card) 26'; Elvedi (yellow card) 85'	Stadium: RheinEnergieStadion; Attendance: 50,000; Referee: Deniz Aytekin

21 September 2019 5	Bayern Munich	4–0	1. FC Köln	Munich
15:30 CEST (UTC+2)	Lewandowski 3', 48'; Boateng (yellow card) 31'; Coutinho 62' (pen.); Hernandez (yellow card) 67'; Perišić 73'; Martínez (yellow card) 74'; Cuisance (yellow card) 83'	Report	Ehizibue (red card) 59'	Stadium: Allianz Arena; Attendance: 75,000; Referee: Patrick Ittrich

29 September 2019 6	1. FC Köln	0–4	Hertha BSC	Cologne
18:00 CEST (UTC+2)	Meré (red card) 41'; Terodde (yellow card) 72'	Report	Dilrosun 23'; Ibišević 58', 62'; Boyata 83'	Stadium: RheinEnergieStadion; Attendance: 49,700; Referee: Sören Storks

5 October 2019 7	Schalke 04	1–1	1. FC Köln	Berlin
18:30 CEST (UTC+2)	Kenny (yellow card) 20'; Serdar (yellow card) 36', (goal) 72'; Sané (yellow card) 45+1'; Oczipka (yellow card) 64'	Report	Katterbach (yellow card) 22'; Ehizibue (yellow card) 40'; Terodde (yellow card) 67'; Hector 90+1'; Modeste (yellow card) 90+3'	Stadium: Olympiastadion; Attendance: 61,883; Referee: Tobias Welz

20 October 2019 8	1. FC Köln	3–0	SC Paderborn	Cologne
15:30 CEST (UTC+2)	Terodde 8'; Schaub 59'; Bornauw 85'	Report		Stadium: RheinEnergieStadion; Attendance: 50,000; Referee: Manuel Gräfe

25 October 2019 9	Mainz 05	3–1	1. FC Köln	Mainz
20:30 CEST (UTC+2)	Boëtius 21'; Kunde (yellow card) 48'; Quaison 57'; Niakhaté (yellow card) 60'; Öztunalı 82'	Report	Terodde 14'; Bornauw (yellow card) 41'; Hector (yellow card) 80'	Stadium: Opel Arena; Attendance: 31,999; Referee: Frank Willenborg

3 November 2019 10	Fortuna Düsseldorf	2–0	1. FC Köln	Düsseldorf
15:30 CET (UTC+1)	Hennings 38' (pen.); Thommy 61'; Bodzek (yellow card) 86'	Report	Ehizibue (yellow card) 26'; Terodde (yellow card) 27'; Drexler (yellow card) 51'	Stadium: Merkur Spiel-Arena; Attendance: 51,155; Referee: Sven Jablonski

8 November 2019 11	1. FC Köln	1–2	1899 Hoffenheim	Cologne
20:30 CET (UTC+1)	Czichos (yellow card) 15'; Córdoba 34', (yellow card) 90+8'; Bornauw (yellow card) 80'; Hector (yellow card) 90+7'	Report	Skov (yellow card) 30'; Rudy (yellow card) 45+1'; Adamyan 48'; Locadia (yellow card) 86', (goal) 90+7' (pen.)	Stadium: RheinEnergieStadion; Attendance: 49,100; Referee: Robert Kampka

23 November 2019 12	RB Leipzig	4–1	1. FC Köln	Leipzig
18:30 CET (UTC+1)	Werner 22'; Forsberg 32' (pen.), 79'; Laimer 37'	Report	Czichos 39'; Kainz (yellow card) 66'; Verstraete (yellow card) 86'; Terodde (yellow card) 89'	Stadium: Red Bull Arena; Attendance: 42,036; Referee: Robert Schröder

30 November 2019 13	1. FC Köln	1–1	FC Augsburg	Cologne
15:30 CET (UTC+1)	Czichos (yellow card) 8' (yellow-red card) 39'; Verstraete (yellow card) 17'; Höger (yellow card) 20'; Drexler (yellow card) 45+4'; Hector (yellow card) 62'; Córdoba 86', (yellow card) 87'; Bornauw (yellow card) 90+3'	Report	Hahn (yellow card) 23' (yellow-red card) 44'; Niederlechner 43'; Max (yellow card) 45+1'	Stadium: RheinEnergieStadion; Attendance: 49,200; Referee: Tobias Stieler

8 December 2019 14	Union Berlin	2–0	1. FC Köln	Berlin
15:30 CET (UTC+1)	Andersson 33', 50'; Andrich (yellow card) 82'	Report	Sobiech (yellow card) 8'; Ehizibue (yellow card) 45'; Drexler (yellow card) 65'	Stadium: Stadion An der Alten Försterei; Attendance: 22,012; Referee: Patrick Ittrich

14 December 2019 15	1. FC Köln	2–0	Bayer Leverkusen	Cologne
15:30 CET (UTC+1)	Thielmann (yellow card) 39'; Córdoba 73'; Ehizibue (yellow card) 79'; Bornauw 84'	Report	Havertz (yellow card) 41'; Dragović (yellow card) 42' (yellow-red card) 62'; Bailey (red card) 78'	Stadium: RheinEnergieStadion; Attendance: 49,500; Referee: Manuel Gräfe

18 December 2019 16	Eintracht Frankfurt	2–4	1. FC Köln	Frankfurt
20:30 CET (UTC+1)	Hinteregger 6', (yellow card) 90'; Paciência 30'; Chandler (yellow card) 32'	Report	Skhiri (yellow card) 35'; Hector 44'; Bornauw 72'; Drexler 81'; Katterbach (yellow card) 82'; Kainz (yellow card) 90+3'; Jakobs 90+4', (yellow card) 90+5'	Stadium: Commerzbank-Arena; Attendance: 50,300; Referee: Deniz Aytekin

21 December 2019 17	1. FC Köln	1–0	Werder Bremen	Cologne
15:30 CET (UTC+1)	Córdoba 39', (yellow card) 64'	Report	Eggestein (yellow card) 45'; Veljković (yellow card) 69'; Moisander (yellow card) 85'; Friedl (yellow card) 89'	Stadium: RheinEnergieStadion; Attendance: 50,000; Referee: Daniel Schlager

18 January 2020 18	1. FC Köln	3–1	VfL Wolfsburg	Cologne
15:30 CET (UTC+1)	Córdoba 22', 45+2'; Hector 62', (yellow card) 81'; Thielmann (yellow card) 66'; Jakobs (yellow card) 86'	Report	Brooks (yellow card) 19'; Guilavogui (yellow card) 25'; Steffen 66'; Weghorst (yellow card) 89'	Stadium: RheinEnergieStadion; Attendance: 49,100; Referee: Marco Fritz

24 January 2020 19	Borussia Dortmund	5–1	1. FC Köln	Dortmund
20:30 CET (UTC+1)	Guerreiro 1'; Reus 29'; Witsel (yellow card) 38'; Sancho 48'; Haaland 78', 87'	Report	Bornauw (yellow card) 13'; Uth 64'	Stadium: Signal Iduna Park; Attendance: 81,365; Referee: Harm Osmers

2 February 2020 20	1. FC Köln	4–0	SC Freiburg	Cologne
15:30 CET (UTC+1)	Jakobs (yellow card) 12', (goal) 90+3'; Córdoba (yellow card) 20', (goal) 55'; Bornauw 29'; Uth (yellow card) 50'; Ehizibue 90+1'	Report	Höfler (yellow card) 62'	Stadium: RheinEnergieStadion; Attendance: 50,000; Referee: Robert Kampka

16 February 2020 22	1. FC Köln	1–4	Bayern Munich	Cologne
15:30 CET (UTC+1)	Uth 70'; Bornauw (yellow card) 78'	Report	Lewandowski 3'; Coman 5'; Gnabry 12', 66'; Boateng (yellow card) 28'; Thiago (yellow card) 49'; Pavard (yellow card) 82'	Stadium: RheinEnergieStadion; Attendance: 50,000; Referee: Felix Zwayer

22 February 2020 23	Hertha BSC	0–5	1. FC Köln	Berlin
15:30 CET (UTC+1)	Stark (yellow card) 45+2'; Ascacíbar (yellow card) 69'	Report	Córdoba 4', 22'; Jarstein 37' (o.g.); Meré (yellow card) 55'; Kainz 62'; Uth 69'; Rexhbecaj (yellow card) 77'	Stadium: Olympiastadion; Attendance: 46,207; Referee: Daniel Schlager

29 February 2020 24	1. FC Köln	3–0	Schalke 04	Cologne
18:30 CET (UTC+1)	Bornauw 9'; Córdoba (yellow card) 38', (goal) 39'; Nübel 75' (o.g.)	Report	Schöpf (yellow card) 66'; Burgstaller (yellow card) 80'	Stadium: RheinEnergieStadion; Attendance: 50,000; Referee: Manuel Gräfe

6 March 2020 25	SC Paderborn	1–2	1. FC Köln	Paderborn
20:00 CET (UTC+1)	Srbeny (yellow card) 34', (goal) 73'; Friðjónsson (yellow card) 63'; Sabiri (yellow card) 88'	Report	Meré 28', (yellow card) 86'; Hector 36'; Uth (yellow card) 79'; Rexhbecaj (yellow card) 80'; Skhiri (yellow card) 85'	Stadium: Benteler-Arena; Attendance: 15,000; Referee: Daniel Siebert

11 March 2020 21	Borussia Mönchengladbach	2–1	1. FC Köln	Mönchengladbach
18:30 CET (UTC+1)	Embolo 32'; Meré 70' (o.g.); Thuram (yellow card) 88'	Report	Kainz (yellow card) 33'; Uth 81', (yellow card) 84'	Stadium: Borussia-Park; Attendance: 0 Referee: Deniz Aytekin
Note: Match originally scheduled for 9 February, but postponed to 11 March due to poor weather conditions caused by Storm Ciara.

17 May 2020 26	1. FC Köln	2–2	Mainz 05	Cologne
15:30 CEST (UTC+2)	Uth 6' (pen.); Hector (yellow card) 19'; Kainz (yellow card) 19', (goal) 53'; Rexhbecaj (yellow card) 87'; Skhiri (yellow card) 90'	Report	Ji Dong-won (yellow card) 37'; Awoniyi 61'; Kunde 72'; Martín (yellow card) 90+3'	Stadium: RheinEnergieStadion; Attendance: 0 Referee: Guido Winkmann
Note: The match was postponed on 13 March due to the pandemic of COVID-19 in Germany, and rescheduled to 17 May.

24 May 2020 27	1. FC Köln	2–2	Fortuna Düsseldorf	Cologne
18:00 CEST (UTC+2)	Modeste 88'; Córdoba 90+1'	Report	Karaman 41'; Thommy 61'; Sobottka (yellow card) 90+4'	Stadium: RheinEnergieStadion; Attendance: 0 Referee: Benjamin Cortus
Note: The match was postponed on 13 March due to the pandemic of COVID-19 in Germany, and rescheduled to 24 May.

27 May 2020 28	1899 Hoffenheim	3–1	1. FC Köln	Sinsheim
20:30 CEST (UTC+2)	Hübner (yellow card) 3' (yellow-red card) 50'; Baumgartner 11', 46'; Grillitsch (yellow card) 28'; Dabbur (yellow card) 45+1'; Zuber 48'; Nordtveit (yellow card) 76'; Bebou (yellow card) 84'	Report	Bornauw (red card) 26'; Kainz 60'; Jakobs (yellow card) 65'	Stadium: Rhein-Neckar-Arena; Attendance: 0 Referee: Felix Brych
Note: The match was postponed on 24 March due to the pandemic of COVID-19 in Germany, and rescheduled to 27 May.

1 June 2020 29	1. FC Köln	2–4	RB Leipzig	Cologne
20:30 CEST (UTC+2)	Córdoba 7'; Leistner (yellow card) 30'; Modeste 55'; Drexler (yellow card) 62'	Report	Schick 20'; Nkunku 38'; Werner 50'; Olmo 57'; Forsberg (yellow card) 89'	Stadium: RheinEnergieStadion; Attendance: 0 Referee: Christian Dingert
Note: The match was postponed on 24 March due to the pandemic of COVID-19 in Germany, and rescheduled to 1 June.

7 June 2020 30	FC Augsburg	1–1	1. FC Köln	Augsburg
18:00 CEST (UTC+2)	Framberger (yellow card) 51'; Max 88'	Report	Schmitz (yellow card) 15'; Uth (yellow card) 25'; Modeste 86'; Hector (yellow card) 90'	Stadium: WWK Arena; Attendance: 0 Referee: Benjamin Cortus
Note: The match was postponed on 24 March due to the pandemic of COVID-19 in Germany, and rescheduled to 7 June.

13 June 2020 31	1. FC Köln	1–2	Union Berlin	Cologne
15:30 CEST (UTC+2)	Hector (yellow card) 44'; Skhiri (yellow card) 76'; Leistner (yellow card) 80'; Córdoba 90+2'	Report	Friedrich 39'; Gentner 67'	Stadium: RheinEnergieStadion; Attendance: 0 Referee: Martin Petersen
Note: The match was postponed on 24 March due to the pandemic of COVID-19 in Germany, and rescheduled to 13 June.

17 June 2020 32	Bayer Leverkusen	3–1	1. FC Köln	Leverkusen
20:30 CEST (UTC+2)	S. Bender 7'; Aránguiz (yellow card) 29'; Havertz 40'; Dragović (yellow card) 45'; Diaby 83'	Report	Czichos (yellow card) 21'; Bornauw 59'; Leistner (yellow card) 65'	Stadium: BayArena; Attendance: 0 Referee: Sven Jablonski
Note: The match was postponed on 24 March due to the pandemic of COVID-19 in Germany, and rescheduled to 17 June.

20 June 2020 33	1. FC Köln	1–1	Eintracht Frankfurt	Cologne
15:30 CEST (UTC+2)	Kainz 45' (pen.), (yellow card) 71'	Report	Rode (yellow card) 56'; Torró (yellow card) 58'; Dost 72'	Stadium: RheinEnergieStadion; Attendance: 0 Referee: Christian Dingert
Note: The match was postponed on 24 March due to the pandemic of COVID-19 in Germany, and rescheduled to 20 June.

27 June 2020 34	Werder Bremen	6–1	1. FC Köln	Bremen
15:30 CEST (UTC+2)	Osako 22', 58'; Rashica 27'; Füllkrug 29'; Vogt (yellow card) 49'; Klaassen 55'; Sargent 68'	Report	Uth (yellow card) 29'; Ehizibue (yellow card) 57'; Drexler 62'	Stadium: Weser-Stadion; Attendance: 0 Referee: Bastian Dankert
Note: The match was postponed on 7 May due to the pandemic of COVID-19 in Germany, and rescheduled to 27 June.

=== DFB-Pokal ===
11 August 2019 First round	Wehen Wiesbaden	3–3 (a.e.t.) (2–3 p)	1. FC Köln	Wiesbaden
18:30 CEST (UTC+2)	Lorch 53', 56'; Mockenhaupt (yellow card) 76'; Franke (yellow card) 84'; Lorch (yellow card) 88'; Kyereh 118'	Report	Córdoba 39'; Kainz 42'; Verstraete (yellow card) 52'; Córdoba (yellow card) 58'; Schaub 107'; Hector (yellow card) 116'	Stadium: Brita-Arena; Attendance: 8,000; Referee: Robert Schröder
	Penalties
	Kuhn (penalty scored); Gül (penalty missed); Guthörl (penalty missed); Kyereh (penalty missed); Ajani (penalty scored)		(penalty scored) Terodde; (penalty scored) Kainz; (penalty missed) Modeste; (penalty missed) Hector; (penalty scored) Verstraete

29 October 2019 Second round	1. FC Saarbrücken	3–2	1. FC Köln	Völklingen
18:30 CET (UTC+1)	Përdedaj (yellow card) 35'; Schorch 53'; Jurcher 57'; Batz (yellow card) 73'; Jänicke 90'; Vunguidica (yellow card) 90+4'	Report	Hector (yellow card) 5', (goal) 70'; Drexler (yellow card) 60'; Terodde 84'; Córdoba (yellow card) 90+3'	Stadium: Hermann-Neuberger-Stadion; Attendance: 6,800; Referee: Martin Petersen

== Statistics ==
=== Appearances and goals ===
No.	Pos	Nat	Player	Total		Bundesliga		DFB-Pokal	
No.	Pos	Nat	Player	Apps	Goals	Apps	Goals	Apps	Goals
Goalkeepers
1	GK	(Germany) GER	Timo Horn	30	0	28	0	2	0
18	GK	(Germany) GER	Thomas Kessler	0	0	0	0	0	0
31	GK	(United States) USA	Brady Scott	0	0	0	0	0	0
32	GK	(Germany) GER	Julian Krahl	0	0	0	0	0	0
Defenders
2	DF	(Germany) GER	Benno Schmitz	15	0	10+4	0	1	0
5	DF	(Germany) GER	Rafael Czichos	21	1	20	1	1	0
14	DF	(Germany) GER	Jonas Hector	28	5	25+1	4	2	1
19	DF	(Netherlands) NED	Kingsley Ehizibue	27	1	24+2	1	1	0
22	DF	(Spain) ESP	Jorge Meré	12	1	5+5	1	2	0
33	DF	(Belgium) BEL	Sebastiaan Bornauw	25	5	24	5	1	0
34	DF	(Germany) GER	Noah Katterbach	15	0	14	0	1	0
37	DF	(Germany) GER	Toni Leistner	7	0	7	0	0	0
38	DF	(Germany) GER	Ismail Jakobs	16	2	16	2	0	0
Midfielders
6	MF	(Germany) GER	Marco Höger	11	0	6+4	0	0+1	0
7	MF	(Germany) GER	Marcel Risse	7	0	0+6	0	1	0
8	MF	(Belgium) BEL	Birger Verstraete	10	0	7+2	0	1	0
17	MF	(Germany) GER	Christian Clemens	0	0	0	0	0	0
20	MF	(Germany) GER	Elvis Rexhbeçaj	7	0	3+4	0	0	0
24	MF	(Germany) GER	Dominick Drexler	24	2	15+7	2	2	0
28	MF	(Tunisia) TUN	Ellyes Skhiri	27	1	25+1	1	1	0
30	MF	(Austria) AUT	Florian Kainz	24	5	12+11	4	1	1
36	MF	(Germany) GER	Niklas Hauptmann	0	0	0	0	0	0
Forwards
9	FW	(Germany) GER	Simon Terodde	24	4	7+15	3	0+2	1
11	FW	(Ghana) GHA	Kingsley Schindler	13	0	9+3	0	1	0
15	FW	(Colombia) COL	Jhon Córdoba	26	12	18+6	11	2	1
23	FW	(Germany) GER	Mark Uth	10	5	10	5	0	0
27	FW	(France) FRA	Anthony Modeste	23	2	9+12	2	2	0
29	FW	(Germany) GER	Jan Thielmann	8	0	6+2	0	0	0
Players transferred out during the season
3	DF	(Germany) GER	Lasse Sobiech	2	0	1	0	1	0
13	MF	(Austria) AUT	Louis Schaub	11	2	7+2	1	0+2	1
35	DF	(Germany) GER	Matthias Bader	2	0	0+1	0	0+1	0

Last updated: 27 May 2020
Source: Soccerway
