= 2020–21 1. FC Köln season =

1. FC Köln
2020–21 season
- President: Werner Wolf
- Head coach: Markus Gisdol (until 11 April); Friedhelm Funkel (from 12 April)
- Stadium: RheinEnergieStadion
- Bundesliga: 16th (play-off winners)
- DFB-Pokal: Round of 16
- Top goalscorer: League: Elvis Rexhbeçaj (5); All: Elvis Rexhbeçaj (7)
Home colours	Away colours	Third colours

The 2020–21 season was the 73rd season in the existence of 1. FC Köln and the club's second consecutive season in the top flight of German football. In addition to the domestic league, 1. FC Köln participated in this season's edition of the DFB-Pokal. The season covered the period from 1 July 2020 to 30 June 2021.

== Players ==
=== First-team squad ===
As of 1 February 2021

Note: Flags indicate national team as defined under FIFA eligibility rules; some limited exceptions apply. Players may hold more than one non-FIFA nationality.

No.	Pos.	Nation	Player
1	GK	GER	Timo Horn (Vice-captain)
2	DF	GER	Benno Schmitz
3	DF	GER	Noah Katterbach
4	DF	GER	Robert Voloder
5	DF	GER	Rafael Czichos
6	MF	GER	Marco Höger
7	FW	NGR	Tolu Arokodare (on loan from Valmieras)
8	DF	GER	Ismail Jakobs
9	FW	SWE	Sebastian Andersson
11	MF	AUT	Florian Kainz
13	MF	GER	Max Meyer
14	MF	GER	Jonas Hector (Captain)
15	MF	GRE	Dimitrios Limnios
16	GK	GER	Ron-Robert Zieler (on loan from Hannover 96)
18	MF	SVK	Ondrej Duda

No.	Pos.	Nation	Player
19	DF	NED	Kingsley Ehizibue
20	MF	GER	Elvis Rexhbeçaj (on loan from VfL Wolfsburg)
21	MF	GER	Salih Özcan
22	DF	ESP	Jorge Meré
23	DF	GER	Jannes Horn
24	MF	GER	Dominick Drexler
25	MF	GER	Tim Lemperle
26	DF	SRB	Sava-Arangel Cestic
28	MF	TUN	Ellyes Skhiri
29	MF	GER	Jan Thielmann
31	MF	GER	Marius Wolf (on loan from Borussia Dortmund)
32	GK	GER	Julian Krahl
33	DF	BEL	Sebastiaan Bornauw
43	FW	NGR	Emmanuel Dennis (on loan from Club Brugge)

=== Players out on loan ===
Note: Flags indicate national team as defined under FIFA eligibility rules; some limited exceptions apply. Players may hold more than one non-FIFA nationality.

No.	Pos.	Nation	Player
—	MF	GER	Niklas Hauptmann (at Holstein Kiel until 30 June 2021)
—	MF	FRA	Vincent Koziello (at CD Nacional until 30 June 2021)
—	FW	FRA	Anthony Modeste (at Saint-Étienne until 30 June 2021)
—	MF	CZE	Tomáš Ostrák (at MFK Karvina until 30 June 2021)
—	MF	GER	Marcel Risse (at Viktoria Köln until 30 June 2021)
—	MF	AUT	Louis Schaub (at FC Luzern until 30 June 2021)
—	FW	GER	Kingsley Schindler (at Hannover 96 until 30 June 2021)
—	DF	GER	Lasse Sobiech (at FC Zürich until 30 June 2021)
—	MF	BEL	Birger Verstraete (at Royal Antwerp until 30 June 2021)
—	DF	GER	Yann Aurel Bisseck (at Vitória de Guimarães until 30 June 2022)

== Transfers ==
=== In ===
No.	Pos	Player	Transferred from	Fee'	Date	Source
16	GK	(Germany) Ron-Robert Zieler	(Germany) Hannover 96	Loan	13 August 2020	
9	FW	(Sweden) Sebastian Andersson	(Germany) Union Berlin	€6,500,000	15 September 2020	
18	MF	(Slovakia) Ondrej Duda	(Germany) Hertha BSC	€7,000,000	16 September 2020	
7	FW	(Nigeria) Tolu Arokodare	(Latvia) Valmieras	Loan	19 September 2020	
15	MF	(Greece) Dimitrios Limnios	(Greece) PAOK	€3,300,000	21 September 2020	
31	MF	(Germany) Marius Wolf	(Germany) Borussia Dortmund	Loan	2 October 2020	
43	FW	(Nigeria) Emmanuel Dennis	(Belgium) Club Brugge	Loan	25 January 2021	
13	MF	(Germany) Max Meyer	(England) Crystal Palace	Free	27 January 2021	

=== Out ===
No.	Pos	Player	Transferred to	Fee	Date	Source
8	MF	(Belgium) Birger Verstraete	(Belgium) Antwerp	Loan	1 July 2020	
18	GK	(Germany) Thomas Kessler	Retired		1 July 2020	
36	MF	(Germany) Niklas Hauptmann	(Germany) Holstein Kiel	Loan	1 July 2020	
28	GK	(Germany) Jan-Christoph Bartels	(Germany) Waldhof Mannheim	Free	15 August 2020	
	DF	(Germany) Yann Aurel Bisseck	(Portugal) Vitória de Guimarães	Loan	3 August 2020	
11	FW	(Germany) Kingsley Schindler	(Germany) Hannover 96	Loan	6 August 2020	
	MF	(Czech Republic) Tomáš Ostrák	(Czech Republic) MFK Karviná	Loan	7 August 2020	
	MF	(France) Vincent Koziello	(Portugal) C.D. Nacional	Loan	11 August 2020	
31	GK	(United States) Brady Scott	(United States) Nashville SC	Free	17 August 2020	
7	MF	(Germany) Marcel Risse	(Germany) Viktoria Köln	Loan	18 August 2020	
9	FW	(Germany) Simon Terodde	(Germany) Hamburger SV	Free	20 August 2020	
3	DF	(Germany) Lasse Sobiech	(Switzerland) FC Zürich	Loan	5 September 2020	
15	FW	(Colombia) Jhon Córdoba	(Germany) Hertha BSC	€15,000,000	15 September 2020	
13	MF	(Austria) Louis Schaub	(Switzerland) FC Luzern	Loan	16 September 2020	
17	MF	(Germany) Christian Clemens	(Germany) SV Darmstadt 98	Free	15 January 2021	
30	DF	(Denmark) Frederik Sørensen		Mutual contract termination	17 January 2021	
27	FW	(France) Anthony Modeste	(France) Saint-Étienne	Loan	1 February 2021	

== Pre-season and friendlies ==
Win Draw Loss Fixtures

11 August 2020 Friendly	1. FC Köln	5–0	SpVg Porz	Cologne, Germany
19:00 CEST (UTC+2)	Córdoba 51', 88'; Clemens 73'; Hector 81'; Skhiri 87'	Report		Stadium: Franz-Kremer-Stadion

15 August 2020 Friendly	1. FC Köln	5–0	SV Deutz 05	Cologne, Germany
16:00 CEST (UTC+2)	Rexhbecaj 8'; Jakobs 11'; Thielmann 43'; Hector 55'; Voloder 71'	Report		Stadium: Franz-Kremer-Stadion; Attendance: 200; Referee: Robin Braun

15 August 2020 Friendly	1. FC Köln	2–1	Blau-Weiß Lohne	Cologne, Germany
18:00 CEST (UTC+2)	Bornauw (yellow card) 29'; Obuz 34'; Córdoba (yellow card) 36'; Clemens 39'	Report	Oevermann (yellow card) 6'; Bornauw 18' (o.g.)	Stadium: Franz-Kremer-Stadion; Attendance: 200; Referee: Sven Waschitzki

18 August 2020 Friendly	1. FC Köln	3–2	VfL Bochum	Cologne, Germany
16:00 CEST (UTC+2)	Jakobs 7'; Kainz 40'; Bornauw (yellow card) 80'; Cestic (yellow card) 82'; Clemens 94'	Report	Ganvoula (yellow card) 11'; Pantović 124'; Ekincier 128'	Stadium: Franz-Kremer-Stadion; Attendance: 200; Referee: Mitja Stegemann
Note: Match was played in three 45-minute periods.

22 August 2020 Friendly	1. FC Köln	2–1	Union Berlin	Friedrichshafen, Germany
17:30 CEST (UTC+2)	Katterbach 11'; Córdoba 12'; Czichos (yellow card) 23'	Report	Teuchert 51' (pen.)	Stadium: Zeppelinstadion; Attendance: 500; Referee: Max Bruda

29 August 2020 Friendly	1. FC Köln	0–3	VfL Wolfsburg	Cologne, Germany
15:30 CEST (UTC+2)		Report	Lacroix (yellow card) 54'; Białek 69'; João Victor 79'; Mallı 82'	Stadium: Franz-Kremer-Stadion; Referee: Mitja Stegemann

5 September 2020 Friendly	1. FC Köln	Cancelled	FC Utrecht	Cologne, Germany
15:30 CEST (UTC+2)				Stadium: Franz-Kremer-Stadion

12 November 2020 Friendly	1. FC Köln	1–3	VfL Bochum	Cologne, Germany
15:00 CET (UTC+1)	Wolf 73', (yellow card) 83'; Thielmann (yellow card) 75'	Report	Meré 22' (o.g.); Bockhorn (yellow card) 23'; Bonga 52'; Čavar 87'	Stadium: Franz-Kremer-Stadion; Attendance: 0 Referee: Mitja Stegemann

== Competitions ==
=== Overview ===
Competition	First match	Last match	Starting round	Final position	Record							
Competition	First match	Last match	Starting round	Final position	Pld	W	D	L	GF	GA	GD	Win %
Bundesliga	19 September 2020	22 May 2021	Matchday 1	16th	34	8	9	17	34	60	−26	23.53
Bundesliga relegation play-offs	26 May 2021	29 May 2021	First leg	Winners	2	1	0	1	5	2	+3	50.00
DFB-Pokal	12 September 2020	3 February 2021	First round	Round of 16	3	2	1	0	9	2	+7	66.67
Total					39	11	10	18	48	64	−16	28.21

Last updated: 29 May 2021
Source: Soccerway

=== Bundesliga ===
==== League table ====
Pos	Team	Pld	W	D	L	GF	GA	GD	Pts	Qualification or relegation
14	Hertha BSC	34	8	11	15	41	52	−11	35	
15	Arminia Bielefeld	34	9	8	17	26	52	−26	35	
16	1. FC Köln (O)	34	8	9	17	34	60	−26	33	Qualification for the relegation play-offs
17	Werder Bremen (R)	34	7	10	17	36	57	−21	31	Relegation to 2. Bundesliga
18	Schalke 04 (R)	34	3	7	24	25	86	−61	16	Relegation to 2. Bundesliga

Source: DFB
Rules for classification: 1) Points; 2) Goal difference; 3) Goals scored; 4) Head-to-head results; 5) Head-to-head away goals scored; 6) Away goals scored; 7) Play-off.
(O) Play-off winners; (R) Relegated

==== Results summary ====
Overall								Home						Away					
Pld	W	D	L	GF	GA	GD	Pts	W	D	L	GF	GA	GD	W	D	L	GF	GA	GD
34	8	9	17	34	60	−26	33	3	5	9	20	31	−11	5	4	8	14	29	−15

Last updated: 22 May 2021.
Source: DFB

==== Results by round ====
Round	1	2	3	4	5	6	7	8	9	10	11	12	13	14	15	16	17	18	19	20	21	22	23	24	25	26	27	28	29	30	31	32	33	34
Ground	H	A	H	H	A	H	A	H	A	H	A	H	A	H	A	H	A	A	H	A	A	H	A	H	A	H	A	H	A	H	A	H	A	H
Result	L	L	L	D	D	L	D	L	W	D	W	L	D	L	L	D	W	L	W	W	L	L	L	D	L	D	L	L	L	W	W	L	D	W
Position	12	16	16	16	16	16	16	17	15	15	15	15	15	15	16	16	16	16	14	14	14	14	14	14	14	16	16	17	17	17	17	17	17	16

Updated to match(es) played on 22 May 2021. Source: DFB
A = Away; H = Home; W = Win; D = Draw; L = Loss

==== Matches ====
The league fixtures were announced on 7 August 2020.

19 September 2020 1	1. FC Köln	2–3	1899 Hoffenheim	Cologne
15:30 CEST (UTC+2)	Andersson 22'; Bornauw (yellow card) 33'; Duda (yellow card) 69'; Hector (yellow card) 85'; Drexler 86'	Report	Kramarić 4', 45+3' (pen.), 90+2'; Bičakčić (yellow card) 45+5'; Bebou (yellow card) 90'; Baumann (yellow card) 90'; Kadeřábek (yellow card) 90+5'	Stadium: RheinEnergieStadion; Attendance: 0 Referee: Daniel Siebert

26 September 2020 2	Arminia Bielefeld	1–0	1. FC Köln	Bielefeld
15:30 CEST (UTC+2)	Klos (yellow card) 45'; Edmundsson 78'; Soukou (yellow card) 89'; Schipplock (yellow card) 90+1'	Report	Hector (yellow card) 17'; Czichos (yellow card) 43'; Sørensen (yellow card) 90+2'	Stadium: Bielefelder Alm; Attendance: 5,460; Referee: Patrick Ittrich

3 October 2020 3	1. FC Köln	1–3	Borussia Mönchengladbach	Cologne
15:30 CEST (UTC+2)	Ehizibue (yellow card) 31'; Rexhbecaj (yellow card) 35', (goal) 84'; Sørensen (yellow card) 90'	Report	Pléa 14'; Lainer 16', (yellow card) 90+2'; Bensebaini (yellow card) 31'; Stindl 56' (pen.); Herrmann (yellow card) 82'	Stadium: RheinEnergieStadion; Attendance: 300; Referee: Marco Fritz

18 October 2020 4	1. FC Köln	1–1	Eintracht Frankfurt	Cologne
15:30 CEST (UTC+2)	Ehizibue (yellow card) 15'; Duda 52'; Rexhbeçaj (yellow card) 54'; Horn (yellow card) 64'	Report	Hasebe (yellow card) 19'; Silva 45+2' (pen.); Younes (yellow card) 88'	Stadium: RheinEnergieStadion; Attendance: 300; Referee: Sven Jablonski

23 October 2020 5	VfB Stuttgart	1–1	1. FC Köln	Stuttgart
20:30 CEST (UTC+2)	Mangala 1'; Silas (yellow card) 52'; Karazor (yellow card) 80'	Report	Ehizibue (yellow card) 8'; Andersson 23' (pen.); Jakobs (yellow card) 56'; Duda (yellow card) 69'; Skhiri (yellow card) 72'; Özcan (yellow card) 88'	Stadium: Mercedes-Benz Arena; Attendance: 0 Referee: Guido Winkmann

31 October 2020 6	1. FC Köln	1–2	Bayern Munich	Cologne
15:30 CET (UTC+1)	Drexler 82'; Wolf (yellow card) 89'	Report	Choupo-Moting (yellow card) 10'; Müller 13' (pen.); Pavard (yellow card) 23'; Gnabry 45+1'	Stadium: RheinEnergieStadion; Attendance: 0 Referee: Frank Willenborg

6 November 2020 7	Werder Bremen	1–1	1. FC Köln	Bremen
20:30 CET (UTC+1)	Mbom (yellow card) 31'; Osako (yellow card) 67'; Bittencourt 82' (pen.)	Report	Wolf (yellow card) 23'; Czichos (yellow card) 65'; Moisander 67' (o.g.)	Stadium: Weser-Stadion; Attendance: 0 Referee: Florian Badstübner

22 November 2020 8	1. FC Köln	1–2	Union Berlin	Cologne
18:00 CET (UTC+1)	Duda (yellow card) 31'; Skhiri 36'	Report	Awoniyi 27'; Ingvartsen (yellow card) 35'; Kruse (penalty missed) 72', 72'; Gießelmann (yellow card) 90+4'	Stadium: RheinEnergieStadion; Attendance: 0 Referee: Tobias Stieler

28 November 2020 9	Borussia Dortmund	1–2	1. FC Köln	Dortmund
15:30 CET (UTC+1)	Can (yellow card) 54'; Hazard 74'	Report	Skhiri 9', 60', (yellow card) 29'; Jakobs (yellow card) 90+1'	Stadium: Signal Iduna Park; Attendance: 0 Referee: Arne Aarnink

5 December 2020 10	1. FC Köln	2–2	VfL Wolfsburg	Cologne
15:30 CET (UTC+1)	Thielmann 18'; Duda 43'	Report	Arnold 29'; Weghorst 47'; Paulo Otávio (yellow card) 90+1'	Stadium: RheinEnergieStadion; Attendance: 0 Referee: Sven Jablonski

12 December 2020 11	Mainz 05	0–1	1. FC Köln	Mainz
15:30 CET (UTC+1)	Niakhaté (yellow card) 37'; Latza (yellow card) 45+1'; Onisiwo (yellow card) 67'; Stöger (yellow card) 75'	Report	Rexhbeçaj 55'; Özcan (yellow card) 70'; Duda (yellow card) 75' (yellow-red card) 76'; Horn (yellow card) 81'	Stadium: Opel Arena; Attendance: 0 Referee: Felix Zwayer

16 December 2020 12	1. FC Köln	0–4	Bayer Leverkusen	Cologne
20:30 CET (UTC+1)	Horn (yellow card) 34'	Report	Weiser 8'; Diaby 10'; Dragović (yellow card) 54'; Schick 54'; Wirtz 59'	Stadium: RheinEnergieStadion; Attendance: 0 Referee: Tobias Stieler

19 December 2020 13	RB Leipzig	0–0	1. FC Köln	Leipzig
15:30 CET (UTC+1)	Halstenberg (yellow card) 84'	Report		Stadium: Red Bull Arena; Attendance: 0 Referee: Felix Brych

2 January 2021 14	1. FC Köln	0–1	FC Augsburg	Cologne
15:30 CET (UTC+1)	Modeste (yellow card) 64'; Bornauw (yellow card) 74'	Report	Uduokhai (yellow card) 12'; Gouweleeuw (yellow card) 64'; Iago 77'; Richter (yellow card) 85'	Stadium: RheinEnergieStadion; Attendance: 0 Referee: Sören Storks

9 January 2021 15	SC Freiburg	5–0	1. FC Köln	Freiburg
15:30 CET (UTC+1)	Demirović 18'; Höfler 39'; Sallai 59'; Lienhart 69'; Höler 79'	Report		Stadium: Schwarzwald-Stadion; Attendance: 0 Referee: Robert Schröder

16 January 2021 16	1. FC Köln	0–0	Hertha BSC	Cologne
15:30 CET (UTC+1)	Čestić (yellow card) 63'; Czichos (yellow card) 77'	Report	Alderete (yellow card) 45+1'; Darida (yellow card) 54'; Córdoba (yellow card) 78'	Stadium: RheinEnergieStadion; Attendance: 0 Referee: Frank Willenborg

20 January 2021 17	Schalke 04	1–2	1. FC Köln	Gelsenkirchen
18:30 CET (UTC+1)	Stambouli (yellow card) 48'; Hoppe 57'; Boujellab (yellow card) 89'	Report	Czichos 31'; Horn (yellow card) 89'; Thielmann 90+3'	Stadium: Veltins-Arena; Attendance: 0 Referee: Daniel Siebert

24 January 2021 18	1899 Hoffenheim	3–0	1. FC Köln	Sinsheim
18:00 CET (UTC+1)	Kramarić 7' (pen.), 75' (pen.); Bebou (yellow card) 13'; Baumgartner 28'; Posch (yellow card) 52'	Report	Čestić (yellow card) 6'; Skhiri (yellow card) 56'; Meré (yellow card) 63'; Modeste (penalty missed) 78'	Stadium: Rhein-Neckar-Arena; Attendance: 0 Referee: Sven Jablonski

31 January 2021 19	1. FC Köln	3–1	Arminia Bielefeld	Cologne
15:30 CET (UTC+1)	Wolf 10', 28'; Jakobs (yellow card) 42'; Duda (yellow card) 54'; Rexhbeçaj 63'	Report	Soukou (yellow card) 64'; Córdova 73'	Stadium: RheinEnergieStadion; Attendance: 0 Referee: Felix Zwayer

6 February 2021 20	Borussia Mönchengladbach	1–2	1. FC Köln	Mönchengladbach
18:30 CET (UTC+1)	Stindl (yellow card) 2'; Neuhaus 16', (yellow card) 90+5'; Herrmann (yellow card) 27'; Jantschke (yellow card) 75'	Report	Rexhbeçaj 3', 55', (yellow card) 86'; Ehizibue (yellow card) 80'	Stadium: Borussia-Park; Attendance: 0 Referee: Christian Dingert

14 February 2021 21	Eintracht Frankfurt	2–0	1. FC Köln	Frankfurt
15:30 CET (UTC+1)	Sow (yellow card) 32'; Silva 57'; Touré (yellow card) 75'; Ndicka 79'; Kostić (yellow card) 86'	Report	Meré (yellow card) 90+1'	Stadium: Deutsche Bank Park; Attendance: 0 Referee: Frank Willenborg

20 February 2021 22	1. FC Köln	0–1	VfB Stuttgart	Cologne
15:30 CET (UTC+1)	Čestić (yellow card) 19'; Czichos (yellow card) 86'	Report	Kempf (yellow card) 29'; Kalajdžić 49'	Stadium: RheinEnergieStadion; Attendance: 0 Referee: Benjamin Cortus

27 February 2021 23	Bayern Munich	5–1	1. FC Köln	Munich
15:30 CET (UTC+1)	Choupo-Moting 18'; Alaba (yellow card) 22'; Lewandowski 33', 65'; Sané (yellow card) 45+1'; Gnabry 82', 86'	Report	Czichos (yellow card) 45'; Skhiri 49'	Stadium: Allianz Arena; Attendance: 0 Referee: Martin Petersen

7 March 2021 24	1. FC Köln	1–1	Werder Bremen	Cologne
15:30 CET (UTC+1)	Jakobs (yellow card) 21'; Drexler (yellow card) 80'; Hector 83'	Report	Sargent 66'	Stadium: RheinEnergieStadion; Attendance: 0 Referee: Matthias Jöllenbeck

13 March 2021 25	Union Berlin	2–1	1. FC Köln	Berlin
15:30 CET (UTC+1)	Musa (yellow card) 32'; Kruse 48' (pen.); Trimmel 67'; Andrich (yellow card) 87'	Report	Horn (yellow card) 11'; Duda 45+2' (pen.); Özcan (yellow card) 81'; Skhiri (yellow card) 85'	Stadium: Stadion An der Alten Försterei; Attendance: 0 Referee: Deniz Aytekin

20 March 2021 26	1. FC Köln	2–2	Borussia Dortmund	Cologne
15:30 CET (UTC+1)	Duda 35' (pen.); Jakobs 65', (yellow card) 90+2'	Report	Haaland 3', 90'; Bellingham (yellow card) 34'	Stadium: RheinEnergieStadion; Attendance: 0 Referee: Daniel Siebert

3 April 2021 27	VfL Wolfsburg	1–0	1. FC Köln	Wolfsburg
15:30 CEST (UTC+2)	Mbabu (yellow card) 22'; Gerhardt (yellow card) 63'; Brekalo 69'	Report	Kainz (yellow card) 90+3'	Stadium: Volkswagen Arena; Attendance: 0 Referee: Robert Hartmann

11 April 2021 28	1. FC Köln	2–3	Mainz 05	Cologne
18:00 CEST (UTC+2)	Duda (yellow card) 22', (goal) 43' (pen.); Katterbach (yellow card) 34'; Skhiri 61'	Report	Boëtius 11'; Mwene (yellow card) 42'; Onisiwo 65'; Barreiro 90+1'	Stadium: RheinEnergieStadion; Attendance: 0 Referee: Felix Brych

17 April 2021 29	Bayer Leverkusen	3–0	1. FC Köln	Leverkusen
18:30 CEST (UTC+2)	Bailey 5', 76'; Tapsoba (yellow card) 40'; Diaby 51'	Report	Czichos (yellow card) 90'	Stadium: BayArena; Attendance: 0 Referee: Sören Storks

20 April 2021 30	1. FC Köln	2–1	RB Leipzig	Cologne
18:30 CEST (UTC+2)	Ehizibue (yellow card) 23'; Hector 46', 60'; Czichos (yellow card) 90+6'	Report	Upamecano (yellow card) 56'; Haidara 59', (yellow card) 90+6'; Kampl (yellow card) 83'	Stadium: RheinEnergieStadion; Attendance: 0 Referee: Frank Willenborg

23 April 2021 31	FC Augsburg	2–3	1. FC Köln	Augsburg
20:30 CEST (UTC+2)	Gumny (yellow card) 45+2', (goal) 54'; Gruezo (yellow card) 52'; Vargas 62'	Report	Duda 8', 33', (yellow card) 90'; Kainz 23'; Wolf (yellow card) 45'; Rexhbeçaj (yellow card) 80'	Stadium: WWK Arena; Attendance: 0 Referee: Martin Petersen

9 May 2021 32	1. FC Köln	1–4	SC Freiburg	Cologne
13:30 CEST (UTC+2)	Wolf (yellow card) 37'; Andersson (yellow card) 47', (goal) 50'; Duda (penalty missed) 62'	Report	Petersen 18'; Demirović 20', (yellow card) 41'; Lienhart (yellow card) 81'; Grifo 90+3'; Schmid 90+6'	Stadium: RheinEnergieStadion; Attendance: 0 Referee: Marco Fritz

15 May 2021 33	Hertha BSC	0–0	1. FC Köln	Berlin
15:30 CEST (UTC+2)	Boyata (yellow card) 13'; Torunarigha (yellow card) 35'	Report	Skhiri (yellow card) 23'; Jakobs (yellow card) 58'	Stadium: Olympiastadion; Attendance: 0 Referee: Deniz Aytekin

22 May 2021 34	1. FC Köln	1–0	Schalke 04	Cologne
15:30 CEST (UTC+2)	Bornauw (yellow card) 44', (goal) 86'	Report	Flick (yellow card) 30'; Idrizi (yellow card) 69'	Stadium: RheinEnergieStadion; Attendance: 0 Referee: Daniel Siebert

==== Relegation play-offs ====
As a result of their 16th-place finish in the regular season, the club qualified for the play-off match with the third-place team in the 2020–21 2. Bundesliga to determine whether the club would remain in the 2021–22 Bundesliga.

26 May 2021 First leg	1. FC Köln	0–1	Holstein Kiel	Cologne
18:30 CEST (UTC+2)	Katterbach (yellow card) 14'; Skhiri (yellow card) 51'; Wolf (yellow card) 53'; Czichos (yellow card) 90'	Report	Bartels (yellow card) 41'; Ignjovski (yellow card) 45'; Van den Bergh (yellow card) 46'; Lorenz 59'	Stadium: RheinEnergieStadion; Attendance: 0 Referee: Felix Zwayer

29 May 2021 Second leg	Holstein Kiel	1–5 (2–5 agg.)	1. FC Köln	Kiel
18:00 CEST (UTC+2)	Lee 4'; Porath (yellow card) 32'	Report	Hector 3'; Andersson 6', 13'; Bornauw (yellow card) 28'; Czichos 39'; J. Horn (yellow card) 44'; T. Horn (yellow card) 65'; Skhiri 84'; Thielmann (yellow card) 88'	Stadium: Holstein-Stadion; Attendance: 2,334; Referee: Deniz Aytekin

=== DFB-Pokal ===
12 September 2020 First round	VSG Altglienicke	0–6	1. FC Köln	Cologne
15:30 CEST (UTC+2)	Skoda (yellow card) 26'; Ciğerci (yellow card) 28'; Häußler (yellow card) 44'; Zeiger (yellow card) 55'	Report	Hector 17' (pen.), (yellow card) 26'; Rexhbeçaj 36', 63'; Czichos 43'; Özcan 68'; Drexler 85'	Stadium: RheinEnergieStadion; Attendance: 300; Referee: Martin Thomsen

22 December 2020 Second round	1. FC Köln	1–0	VfL Osnabrück	Cologne
18:30 CET (UTC+1)	Modeste 45+1'; Jakobs (yellow card) 51'; Bornauw (yellow card) 85'	Report	Henning (yellow card) 54'	Stadium: RheinEnergieStadion; Attendance: 0 Referee: Robert Hartmann

3 February 2021 Round of 16	Jahn Regensburg	2–2 (a.e.t.) (4–3 p)	1. FC Köln	Regensburg
20:45 CET (UTC+1)	Kennedy 35'; George 43'; Vrenezi (yellow card) 70'	Report	Jakobs 4'; Dennis 22', (penalty missed) 78'; Schmitz (yellow card) 47'; Czichos (yellow card) 93'	Stadium: Jahnstadion Regensburg; Attendance: 0 Referee: Robert Hartmann
	Penalties
	Wekesser (penalty scored); Gimber (penalty scored); Albers (penalty missed); Vrenezi (penalty scored); Besuschkow (penalty scored)		(penalty scored) Czichos; (penalty scored) Özcan; (penalty scored) Arokodare; (penalty missed) Meré; (penalty missed) J. Horn

== Statistics ==
=== Appearances and goals ===
No.	Pos	Nat	Player	Total		Bundesliga		DFB-Pokal		Relegation play-offs	
No.	Pos	Nat	Player	Apps	Goals	Apps	Goals	Apps	Goals	Apps	Goals
Goalkeepers
1	GK	(Germany) GER	Timo Horn	39	0	34	0	3	0	2	0
16	GK	(Germany) GER	Ron-Robert Zieler	1	0	0+1	0	0	0	0	0
32	GK	(Germany) GER	Julian Krahl	0	0	0	0	0	0	0	0
Defenders
2	DF	(Germany) GER	Benno Schmitz	15	0	4+8	0	1+1	0	1	0
3	DF	(Germany) GER	Noah Katterbach	25	0	12+9	0	2+1	0	1	0
4	DF	(Germany) GER	Robert Voloder	0	0	0	0	0	0	0	0
5	DF	(Germany) GER	Rafael Czichos	32	3	26+2	1	2	1	2	1
8	DF	(Germany) GER	Ismail Jakobs	27	2	18+5	1	2	1	1+1	0
19	DF	(Netherlands) NED	Kingsley Ehizibue	23	0	15+6	0	0+1	0	1	0
22	DF	(Spain) ESP	Jorge Meré	20	0	14+2	0	3	0	0+1	0
23	DF	(Germany) GER	Jannes Horn	32	0	20+9	0	2	0	1	0
26	DF	(Serbia) SRB	Sava-Arangel Cestic	11	0	11	0	0	0	0	0
33	DF	(Belgium) BEL	Sebastiaan Bornauw	28	1	23+1	1	1+1	0	2	0
Midfielders
6	MF	(Germany) GER	Marco Höger	4	0	1+2	0	0+1	0	0	0
10	MF	(Slovakia) SVK	Ondrej Duda	36	7	32	7	2	0	2	0
11	MF	(Germany) GER	Florian Kainz	9	1	6+2	1	0	0	1	0
13	MF	(Germany) GER	Max Meyer	12	0	3+7	0	0+1	0	0+1	0
14	MF	(Germany) GER	Jonas Hector	23	5	15+4	3	1+1	1	2	1
20	MF	(Germany) GER	Elvis Rexhbeçaj	33	7	20+10	5	2+1	2	0	0
21	MF	(Germany) GER	Salih Özcan	32	1	15+13	0	2+1	1	1	0
24	MF	(Germany) GER	Dominick Drexler	31	3	11+16	2	1+1	1	0+2	0
25	MF	(Germany) GER	Tim Lemperle	1	0	0	0	0+1	0	0	0
28	MF	(Tunisia) TUN	Ellyes Skhiri	37	6	32	5	3	0	2	1
29	MF	(Germany) GER	Jan Thielmann	28	2	9+15	2	1+1	0	0+2	0
31	MF	(Germany) GER	Marius Wolf	35	2	28+3	2	2	0	2	0
Forwards
7	FW	(Nigeria) NGR	Tolu Arokodare	11	0	0+10	0	0+1	0	0	0
9	FW	(Sweden) SWE	Sebastian Andersson	18	5	14+2	3	0	0	1+1	2
15	FW	(Greece) GRE	Dimitrios Limnios	13	0	2+10	0	1	0	0	0
43	FW	(Nigeria) NGR	Emmanuel Dennis	10	1	6+3	0	1	1	0	0
Players transferred out during the season
15	FW	(Colombia) COL	Jhon Córdoba	0	0	0	0	0	0	0	0
17	MF	(Germany) GER	Christian Clemens	0	0	0	0	0	0	0	0
27	FW	(France) FRA	Anthony Modeste	9	1	1+7	0	1	1	0	0
30	DF	(Denmark) DEN	Frederik Sørensen	3	0	1+2	0	0	0	0	0

Last updated: 29 May 2021
Source: Competitions

=== Goalscorers ===
Rank	Pos	No.	Nat	Name	Bundesliga	DFB-Pokal	Relegation play-offs	Total
1	MF	7	(Germany)	Elvis Rexhbeçaj	5	2	0	7
1	MF	10	(Slovakia)	Ondrej Duda	7	0	0	7
3	MF	28	(Tunisia)	Ellyes Skhiri	5	0	1	6
4	FW	9	(Sweden)	Sebastian Andersson	3	0	2	5
4	MF	14	(Germany)	Jonas Hector	3	1	1	5
6	DF	5	(Germany)	Rafael Czichos	1	1	1	3
6	MF	24	(Germany)	Dominick Drexler	2	1	0	3
8	DF	8	(Germany)	Ismail Jakobs	1	1	0	2
8	MF	29	(Germany)	Jan Thielmann	2	0	0	2
8	MF	31	(Germany)	Marius Wolf	2	0	0	2
11	MF	11	(Germany)	Florian Kainz	1	0	0	1
11	MF	21	(Germany)	Salih Özcan	0	1	0	1
11	FW	27	(France)	Anthony Modeste	1	0	0	1
11	DF	33	(Belgium)	Sebastiaan Bornauw	1	0	0	1
11	FW	43	(Nigeria)	Emmanuel Dennis	0	1	0	1
Own goals					1	0	0	1
Totals					34	9	5	48

Last updated: 29 May 2021
