= Jonas Hector =

German footballer (born 1990)

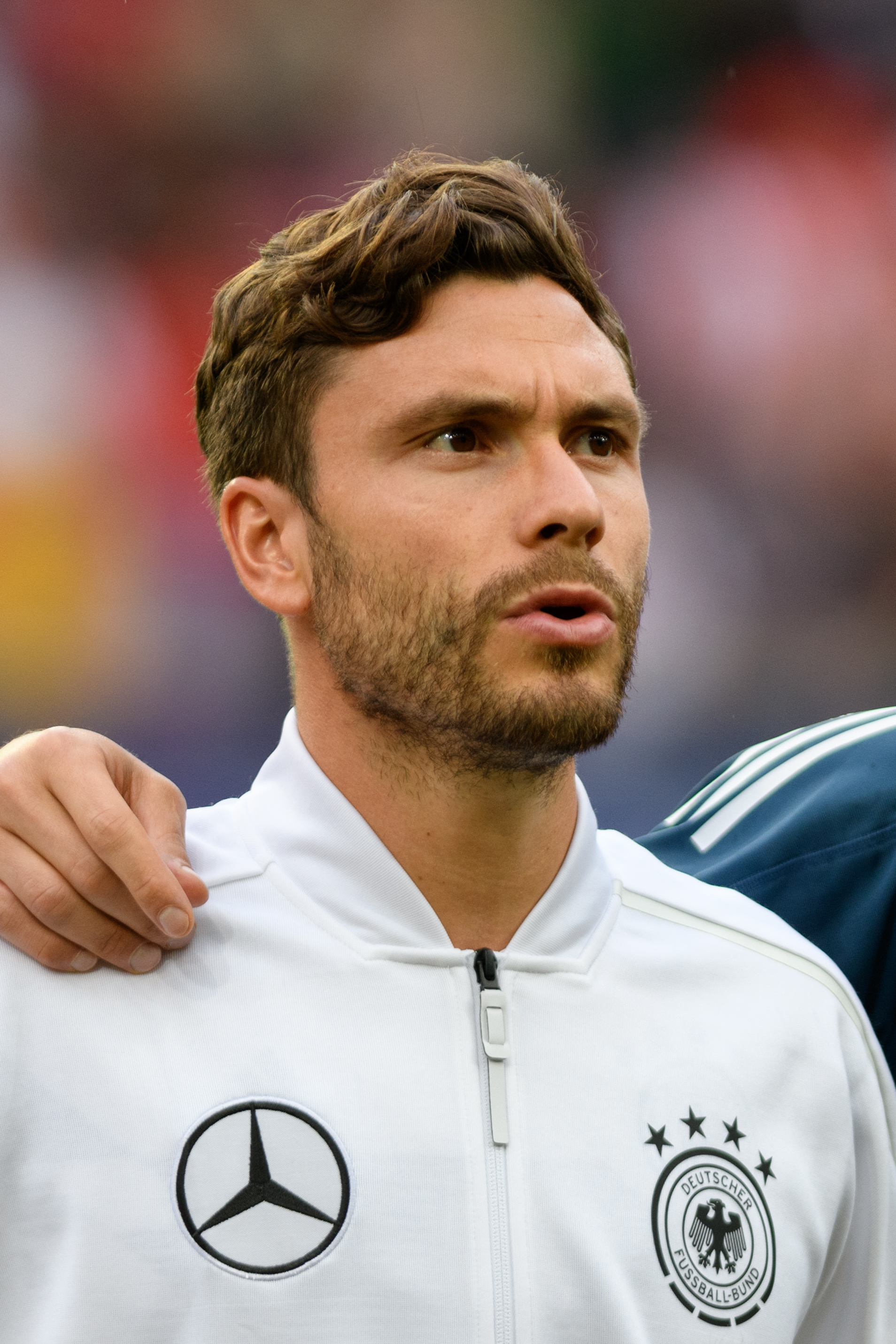
- Hector with Germany in 2018

Personal information
- Full name: Jonas Armin Hector
- Date of birth: 27 May 1990 (age 36)
- Place of birth: Saarbrücken, West Germany
- Height: 1.85 m (6 ft 1 in)
- Positions: Left-back; midfielder

Youth career
- 1998–2009: SV Auersmacher

Senior career*
Years	Team	Apps	(Gls)
2009–2010	SV Auersmacher	34	(9)
2010–2012	1. FC Köln II	63	(5)
2012–2023	1. FC Köln	314	(20)
Total		411	(34)

International career
2014–2019	Germany	43	(3)
Medal record
Representing Germany
FIFA Confederations Cup
Winner	2017
- * Club domestic league appearances and goals

Jonas Armin Hector (German pronunciation: [ˈjoːnas ˈhɛktoːɐ̯]; born 27 May 1990) is a German former professional footballer who played as a left-back and midfielder.

Hector spent almost the entirety of his senior professional career for German club 1. FC Köln, making 347 appearances for the side across an eleven-year period. He also represented the Germany national team from 2014 to 2019, even while having played in the second division with his club.

== Club career ==
=== 1. FC Köln ===
After beginning his youth career and its first steps in senior football with SV Auersmacher in his home state of Saarland, Hector transferred to 1. FC Köln in 2010. He was promoted to the first team by coach Holger Stanislawski for the 2012–13 season and was given a debut in the first round of the DFB-Pokal against SpVgg Unterhaching on 18 August 2012. On 27 August, he made his league debut in a 2. Bundesliga match against Erzgebirge Aue. He established himself as a starting player for Köln during the season, making 24 appearances in the league.

In 2013–14, Hector started 33 of Köln's 34 matches as the FC won the second division championship, gaining promotion to the Bundesliga. On 4 November 2013, he scored his first professional goal in a 4–0 defeat of Union Berlin.

The following season, he again played in all but one of Köln's league matches, making his Bundesliga debut against Hamburger SV on the first matchday. On 4 October 2014, he scored his first Bundesliga goal in a 3–2 loss at Eintracht Frankfurt. He was named Köln's Player of the Season for 2014–15 by the club's official website with 54.41% of the vote. On 31 December 2015, Hector was also named Köln's "Winner of the Year" by Cologne newspaper Express, who named the defender the club's "Mr. Reliable".

On 7 February 2016, Hector captained Köln for the first time in a 1–1 draw with Hamburger SV. At the end of the 2015–16 season, Hector was reported to have the most crosses blocked in Bundesliga, recording a total of 20 blocks.

After a successful season and an impressive Euro campaign, Hector received interest from the likes of Liverpool and Chelsea, which led to negotiations on a new contract. On 14 August 2016, Hector signed a new contract until 2021.

On 23 April 2018, Hector and the Köln announced he had signed a new contract, even though the club was effectively relegated into the 2. Bundesliga at this point. After Köln's 3–2 loss to SC Freiburg the following matchday, it was confirmed that the team had been relegated. On 12 January, he was awarded the 2018 Bundesliga Goal of the Year award for his chipped goal against Wolfsburg in the season before. On 27 May 2023, he played his last professional match for Köln against Munich.

== International career ==
On 7 November 2014, Hector was called up to the Germany national team for the first time ahead of a UEFA Euro 2016 qualifying match against Gibraltar and a friendly against Spain. Manager Joachim Löw said "We want to get to know Jonas Hector better; he's in good form for Cologne." He made his debut in the 4–0 win over Gibraltar in Nuremberg on 14 November, replacing Erik Durm for the last 18 minutes.

On 4 September 2015, he started a Euro 2016 qualifier against Poland at left back and assisted goals for Thomas Müller and Mario Götze thus further staking his claim to the left back position for Germany.

On 29 March 2016, Hector scored his first goal for Germany in a 4–1 win over Italy in Munich.

On 31 May 2016, Hector was named in Germany's final 23-man squad for UEFA Euro 2016. On 2 July 2016, Hector scored the winning kick in the quarter-final penalty shootout against Italy to take the German team into the Euro 2016 semi-final stage.

In 2017, Hector was named in Germany's squad for the Confederations Cup in Russia. He played in all-but-one of Germany's matches at the tournament as the nation went on to lift the title.

On 15 May 2018, Hector was called up to Germany's preliminary squad for the 2018 FIFA World Cup. He was selected in Germany's final 23-man squad on 4 June 2018.

On 14 October 2020, it was reported that Hector had retired from international football and would no longer represent Germany's national team. Of his 43 internationals for Germany his team won 28.

== Career statistics ==
=== Club ===
Appearances and goals by club, season and competition
Club	Season	League			National cup		Europe		Other		Total	
Club	Season	Division	Apps	Goals	Apps	Goals	Apps	Goals	Apps	Goals	Apps	Goals
SV Auersmacher	2009–10	Oberliga Südwest	34	9	—		—		—		34	9
1. FC Köln II	2010–11	Regionalliga West	31	5	—		—		—		31	5
1. FC Köln II	2011–12	Regionalliga West	30	0	—		—		—		30	0
1. FC Köln II	2012–13	Regionalliga West	2	0	—		—		—		2	0
1. FC Köln II	Total		63	5	0	0	0	0	0	0	63	5
1. FC Köln	2012–13	2. Bundesliga	24	0	2	0	—		—		26	0
1. FC Köln	2013–14	2. Bundesliga	33	2	3	0	—		—		36	2
1. FC Köln	2014–15	Bundesliga	33	2	3	0	—		—		36	2
1. FC Köln	2015–16	Bundesliga	32	0	2	0	—		—		34	0
1. FC Köln	2016–17	Bundesliga	33	1	3	0	—		—		36	1
1. FC Köln	2017–18	Bundesliga	20	2	1	0	1	0	—		22	2
1. FC Köln	2018–19	2. Bundesliga	29	6	2	0	—		—		31	6
1. FC Köln	2019–20	Bundesliga	29	4	2	1	—		—		31	5
1. FC Köln	2020–21	Bundesliga	19	3	2	1	—		2	1	23	5
1. FC Köln	2021–22	Bundesliga	30	0	3	0	—		—		33	0
1. FC Köln	2022–23	Bundesliga	32	0	1	0	6	0	—		39	0
1. FC Köln	Total		314	20	24	2	7	0	2	1	347	23
Career total			411	34	24	2	7	0	2	1	444	37

=== International ===
Appearances and goals by national team and year
National team	Year	Apps	Goals
Germany	2014	1	0
Germany	2015	9	0
Germany	2016	15	3
Germany	2017	10	0
Germany	2018	7	0
Germany	2019	1	0
Total		43	3

Scores and results list Germany's goal tally first.

List of international goals scored by Jonas Hector
No.	Date	Venue	Opponent	Score	Result	Competition
1	29 March 2016	Allianz Arena, Munich, Germany	Italy	3–0	4–1	Friendly
2	11 November 2016	San Marino Stadium, Serravalle, San Marino	San Marino	3–0	8–0	2018 FIFA World Cup qualification
3	11 November 2016	San Marino Stadium, Serravalle, San Marino	San Marino	5–0	8–0	2018 FIFA World Cup qualification

== Honours ==
1. FC Köln

- 2. Bundesliga: 2013–14, 2018–19

Germany

- FIFA Confederations Cup: 2017
