= Kingsley Ehizibue =

Nigerian footballer (born 1995)

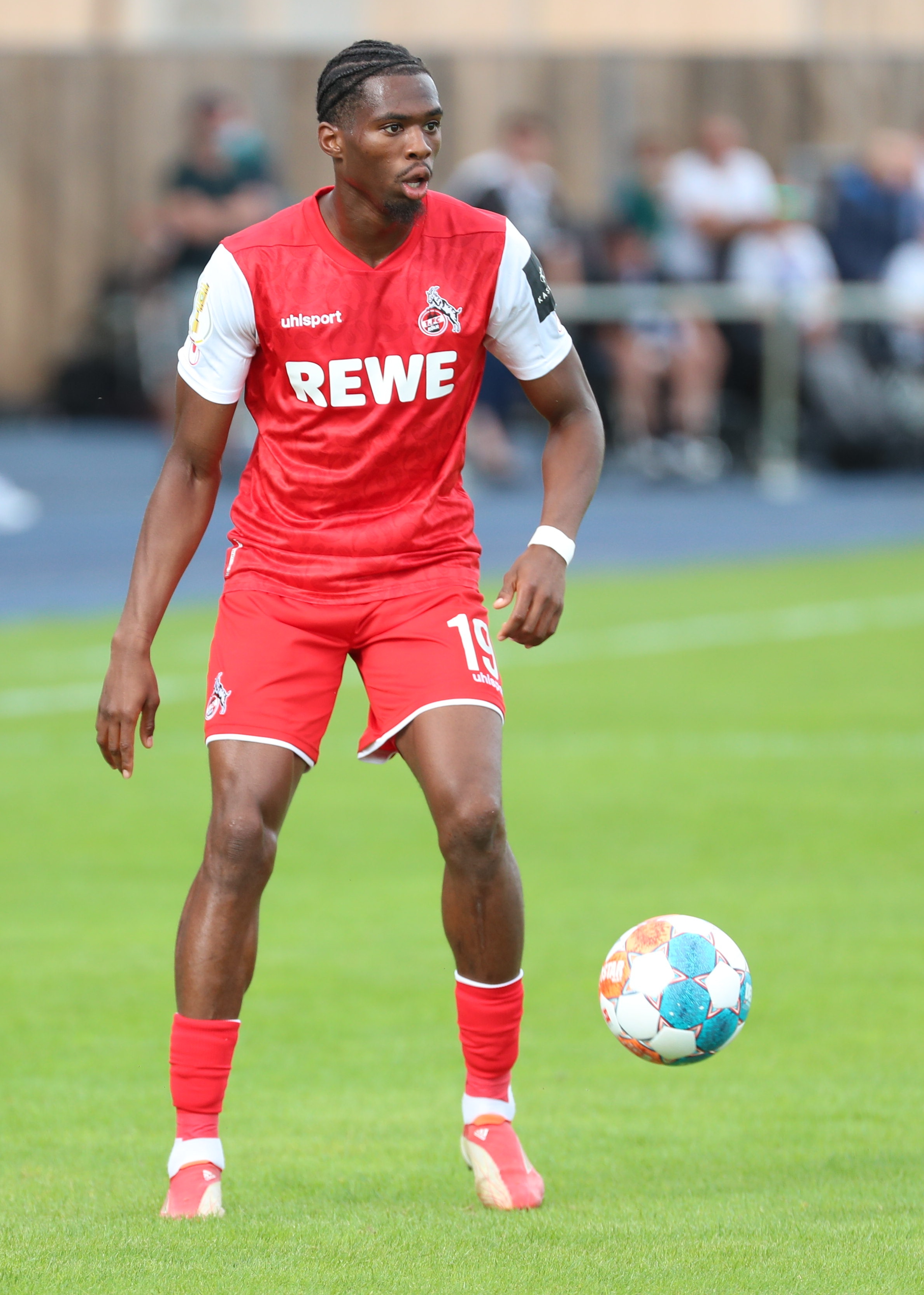
- Ehizibue with 1. FC Köln in 2021

Personal information
- Full name: Kingsley Osezele Ehizibue
- Date of birth: 25 May 1995 (age 31)
- Place of birth: Munich, Germany
- Height: 1.89 m (6 ft 2 in)
- Position: Right-back

Team information
- Current team: Genoa

Youth career
- CSV'28
- –2014: PEC Zwolle

Senior career*
Years	Team	Apps	(Gls)
2014–2019	PEC Zwolle	125	(8)
2019–2022	1. FC Köln	69	(1)
2022–2026	Udinese	115	(4)
2026–	Genoa	5	(1)

International career^{‡}
2016	Netherlands U21	1	(0)
- * Club domestic league appearances and goals as of 20:07, 29 October 2026 (UTC) ‡ National team caps and goals as of 18:06, 15 April 2016 (UTC)

Kingsley Osezele Ehizibue (born 25 May 1995) is a professional footballer who plays as a right-back for Serie A club Genoa. Born in Germany, he played for the Netherlands at youth level and was called up to the Nigeria national team.

== Early years ==
Ehizibue was born in Germany to Nigerian parents, and moved to the Netherlands at age two, growing up in Zwolle. He started playing football at local amateur outfit CSV'28.

== Club career ==
Ehizibue made his professional debut for PEC Zwolle on 29 October 2014 against HHC Hardenberg in a Dutch Cup game and made his Eredivisie debut on 13 December 2014 against Willem II.

On 31 May 2019, Bundesliga club 1. FC Köln announced the transfer of Ehizibue on a four-year contract until 2023.

On 30 August 2022, Serie A club Udinese announced the signing of Ehizibue on a contract until 2026. He scored his first goal for the club in a 1–0 away victory over Sampdoria on 22 January 2023.

On 3 September 2026, fellow Serie A side Genoa announced the signing of Ehizibue.

== International career ==
Ehizibue played once for the Netherlands national under-21 team in 2016.

In 2016, Ehizibue was called up to the Nigeria national team by manager Gernot Rohr, but did not make an appearance. On 3 March 2020, he was called up ahead of the 2021 Africa Cup of Nations qualifying fixtures against Sierra Leone. Ehizibue's inability to hold dual nationality under Dutch law had prevented him from being considered for Nigeria, despite his stated desire to represent the country.

== Personal life ==
Ehizibue is an evangelical Christian who regularly attends Hillsong Church and other evangelical churches.

== Career statistics ==
As of match played 28 October 2026

Appearances and goals by club, season and competition
Club	Season	League			National cup (Note: Includes KNVB Cup, DFB-Pokal, Coppa Italia)		Other		Total	
Club	Season	Division	Apps	Goals	Apps	Goals	Apps	Goals	Apps	Goals
PEC Zwolle	2014–15	Eredivisie	3	0	1	0	–		4	0
PEC Zwolle	2015–16	Eredivisie	28	4	0	0	–		28	4
PEC Zwolle	2016–17	Eredivisie	29	2	2	1	–		31	3
PEC Zwolle	2017–18	Eredivisie	33	1	4	0	–		37	1
PEC Zwolle	2018–19	Eredivisie	32	1	3	0	–		35	1
PEC Zwolle	Total		125	8	10	1	–		135	9
FC Köln	2019–20	Bundesliga	31	1	1	0	–		32	1
FC Köln	2020–21	Bundesliga	21	0	1	0	1 (Note: Appearance in Bundesliga relegation play-off)	0	23	0
FC Köln	2021–22	Bundesliga	16	0	2	0	–		18	0
FC Köln	2022–23	Bundesliga	1	0	1	0	1	0	3	0
FC Köln	Total		69	1	5	0	2	0	76	1
Udinese	2022–23	Serie A	27	2	1	0	–		28	2
Udinese	2023–24	Serie A	23	0	0	0	–		23	0
Udinese	2024–25	Serie A	33	0	1	0	–		34	0
Udinese	2025–26	Serie A	32	2	2	0	–		34	2
Udinese	Total		115	4	4	0	–		119	4
Genoa	2026–27	Serie A	5	1	0	0	–		5	1
Career total			314	14	19	1	2	0	335	15
