= Anthony Modeste (French footballer) =

French footballer (born 1988)

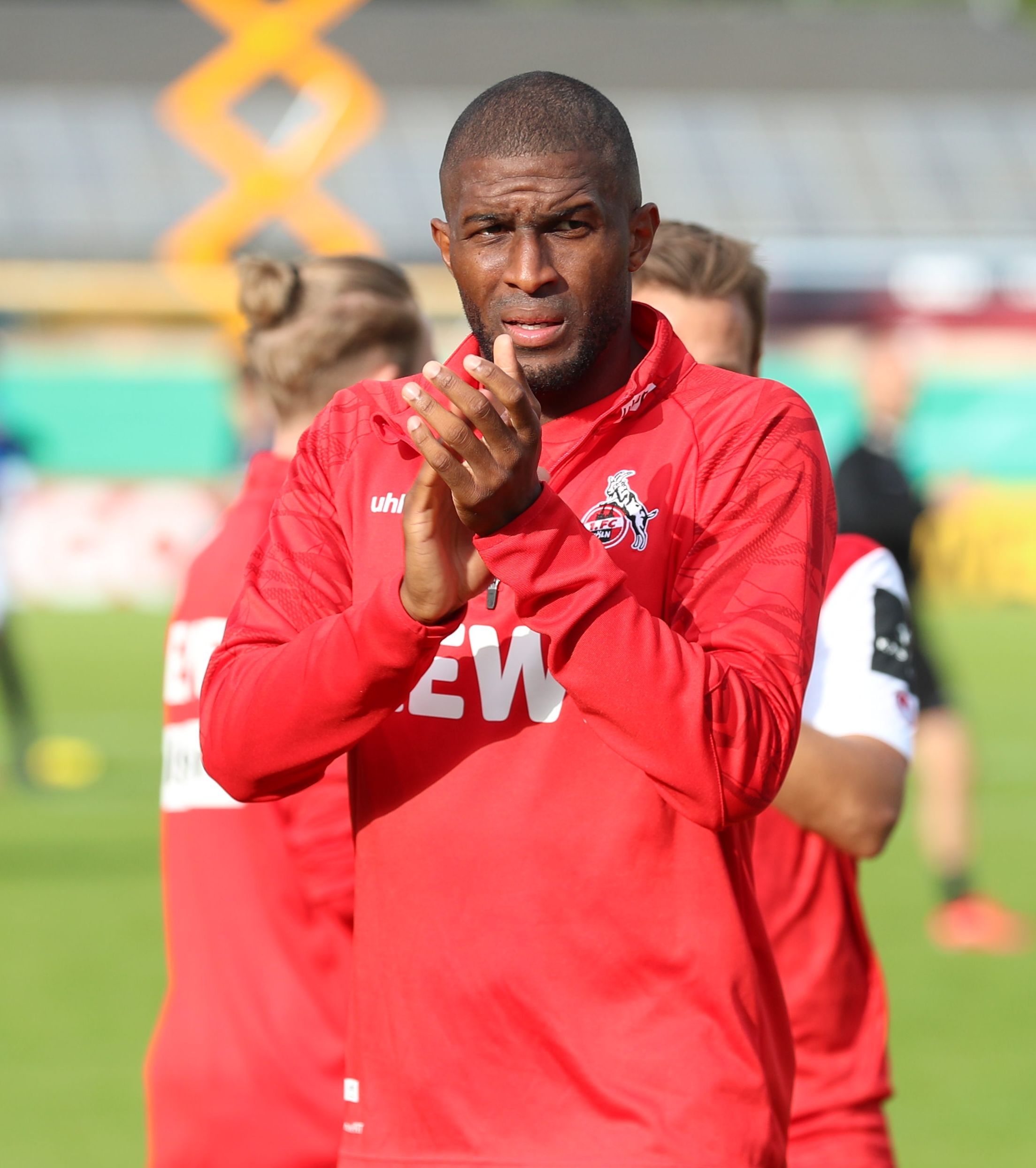
- Modeste playing for 1. FC Köln in 2021

Personal information
- Full name: Anthony Stéphane Bernard Modeste
- Date of birth: 14 April 1988 (age 38)
- Place of birth: Cannes, Alpes-Maritimes, France
- Height: 1.87 m (6 ft 2 in)
- Position: Striker

Youth career
- 2001–2003: Fréjus
- 2003–2007: Nice

Senior career*
Years	Team	Apps	(Gls)
2007–2010	Nice	42	(3)
2009–2010	→ Angers (loan)	37	(20)
2010–2013	Bordeaux	52	(13)
2012	→ Blackburn Rovers (loan)	9	(0)
2012–2013	→ Bastia (loan)	36	(15)
2013–2015	1899 Hoffenheim	55	(19)
2015–2017	1. FC Köln	68	(40)
2017–2018	Tianjin Quanjian	20	(11)
2018–2022	1. FC Köln	77	(30)
2021–2022	→ Saint-Étienne (loan)	7	(0)
2022–2023	Borussia Dortmund	19	(2)
2023–2024	Al Ahly	17	(4)
2025	Intercity	11	(1)

International career
2008–2010	France U21	16	(6)
- * Club domestic league appearances and goals as of 24 May 2025

Anthony Stéphane Bernard Modeste (born 14 April 1988) is a French professional footballer who plays as a striker.

He started his career at Nice, then spent a season on loan at Angers. In 2010, he joined Bordeaux, where he was loaned out to Blackburn Rovers and Bastia. He later played for Bundesliga clubs 1899 Hoffenheim and 1. FC Köln, before playing a season at Tianjin Quanjian in China. He returned to his former club 1. FC Köln in 2018, then loaned out to Saint-Étienne in 2021. He joined Borussia Dortmund for the 2022–23 season. In September 2023, Modeste signed for Egyptian club Al Ahly.

== Club career ==
=== Nice ===
Modeste started his career as a teenager at French club Nice. He showed glimpses of his huge potential when he played for Nice, with several very impressive performances for one so young. During the 2009–2010 season, Modeste was loaned out to Angers. At only 21 years of age, Modeste proved to be a huge success at Angers, scoring 20 league goals during that season and also being named in the League's team of the season. His eye catching performances during his loan spell at Angers attracted the interest of several big French and English clubs.

=== Bordeaux ===
On 13 August 2010, Modeste joined Bordeaux from OGC Nice for an undisclosed fee thought to be €3.5 million and signed a four-year contract with the club.

On 19 January 2012, Modeste joined Blackburn Rovers on loan for the rest of the 2011–12 Premier League season, with his French employers insisting there would be no option to buy at the end of the loan period.

Blackburn Rovers got relegated in the 2011–12 Premier League season after Modeste got a red card in one of the final games of the season against West Bromwich Albion which Blackburn ultimately lost 3–0 and made survival for the next season practically impossible.

On 31 July 2012, he signed on loan for Bastia. He scored on his debut in a 3–2 victory over Sochaux. His lone season at Bastia was a huge success, as he scored 15 league goals in the French top division and he set up many other goals for teammates. He was Bastia's best player of that season.

=== 1899 Hoffenheim ===
On 9 July 2013, Modeste signed with 1899 Hoffenheim on a three-year contract. Modeste made his club debut in the DFB-Pokal at fifth-tier SG Aumund-Vegesack on 3 August, scoring two goals and assisting one. Modeste's Bundesliga debut came on 10 August against Nürnberg, scoring a goal in the 2–2 draw. The following weekend at Hamburg, Modeste scored a brace in the 1–5 victory, en route to scoring six goals in his first seven games in the Bundesliga with Hoffenheim.

After having started his first 15 matches with Hoffenheim, Modeste was demoted from the starting lineup in favor of Sven Schipplock after a string of three consecutive losses, and four in five matches. On 8 February 2014, entering as a substitute, Modeste scored a late equaliser against Freiburg, scoring for the first time since late September. On 2 March against Wolfsburg, Modeste made his first start since late November, scoring two goals and assisting another in the 6–2 victory. Modeste scored in three consecutive matches in late March, including the first goal of a 3–3 draw at defending champions Bayern Munich before being forced off with injury. On 26 April against Eintracht Frankfurt, Modeste picked up a red card for a violent reaction towards opponent Carlos Zambrano, who appeared to have initiated the incident and went unpunished. Modeste was banned by the DFB for the final two matches of the season, finishing his year with 14 goals in 33 appearances in all competitions.

The summer signing of Ádám Szalai entering the 2014–15 season provided competition for Modeste at the lone striker position, and the two, along with Schipplock, all shared time throughout the year. As a result, Modeste's playing time was sporadic, and while he only made four fewer starts in the Bundesliga than the previous season, he only started two consecutive matches once prior to a six-game run in the starting lineup to end the season, compared to a thirteen-game run as well as a six-game run in the previous season. Modeste scored in four of his first five starts, but after a five-month scoring drought, he finished with just 7 goals in the Bundesliga. All told, in two seasons with Hoffenheim, Modeste featured in 62 competitive matches, scoring 23 goals in the process.

=== 1. FC Köln ===
==== 2015–16 season ====
On 26 June 2015, Modeste joined fellow German club 1. FC Köln for an undisclosed fee, signing a four-year deal. On 8 August 2015, Modeste marked his competitive debut by scoring a hat-trick in a 4–0 win at SV Meppen in the first round of the DFB-Pokal. His first goal came after just 45 seconds, making it the fastest DFB-Pokal cup goal in the history of 1. FC Köln. In his Bundesliga debut with Köln on 16 August, Modeste converted a penalty, which he earned himself after being fouled by goalkeeper Przemysław Tytoń, for a winner at Stuttgart, while later assisting Yuya Osako for the final goal in a 1–3 victory. Modeste scored in 7 of his first 9 matches in all competitions, highlighted by a penalty which he again earned himself against Hamburg on 29 August for the winner in a 2–1 victory, and a second half winner in a 1–0 victory against rivals Mönchengladbach on 19 September.

Appearing as a substitute for the first and only time that season, Modeste picked up the final goal in a 2–1 victory over Dortmund on 19 December at the end of normal time, scoring for the first time in nine games. Modeste entered the Christmas break with 7 goals in the Bundesliga, and opened his 2016 scoring account with goals in two games, and four goals in seven. On 17 April, Modeste scored a late winner in a 2–3 victory at Mainz. The following weekend, Modeste scored his first brace of the Bundesliga season, coming in a 4–1 victory over Darmstadt, and guaranteeing Köln's participation in the Bundesliga the next season. On the final day of the season, Modeste scored his 15th league goal in a 2–2 draw at Dortmund.

==== 2016–17 season ====
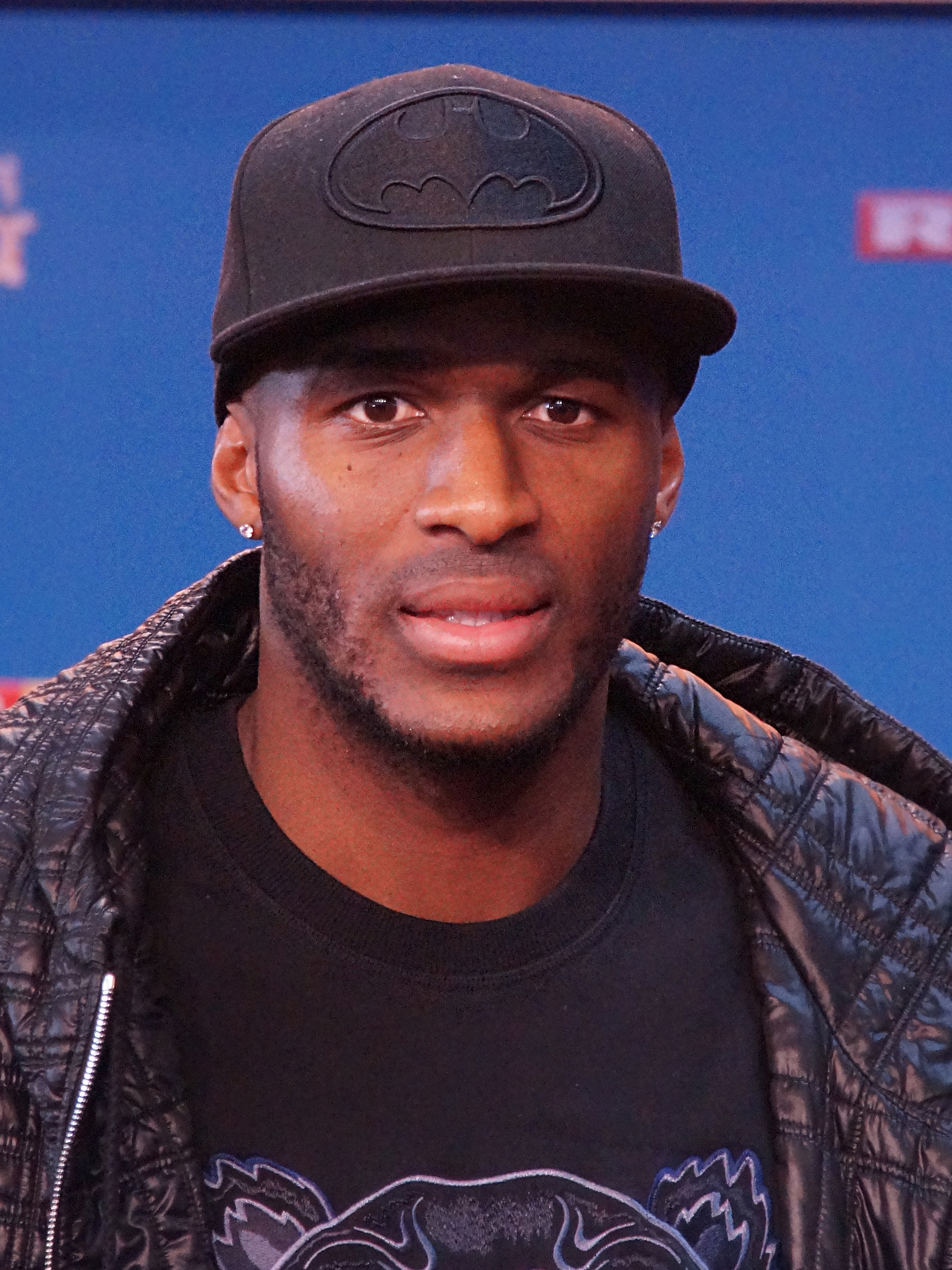
Modeste in 2016

After the season, Modeste was inquired upon by West Ham United as well as Chinese side Beijing Guoan, who made what was described as a "mega-offer" by Modeste. However, Modeste signed a new contract with Köln on 4 July 2016, running until the summer of 2021 and worth a reported €2.5 million annually, citing the medical care in Germany in regard to his son. Athletic director Jörg Schmadtke wanted to tender him a contract because of his "commitment to the club" as well as his "high worth" to the team, while also mentioning that he "proved that he is a good Bundesliga striker" in his first season with Köln.

The 2016–17 season began with incredibly impressive goal-scoring form from Modeste. On 20 August 2016, in Köln's opening match of the season in the DFB-Pokal, Modeste scored the second goal in a 0–7 thrashing at sixth-tier BFC Preussen. The next weekend, the first of the 2016–17 Bundesliga, Modeste scored the second goal in a 2–0 victory over Darmstadt, his goal coming shortly after a weather stoppage. Modeste picked up his first brace of the season on 16 September against Freiburg in a 3–0 victory which brought Köln to the top of the table for the first time in roughly 20 years, while he also assisted Yuya Osako's equaliser and scored the winner at Schalke the following week.

Modeste scored in all 5 matches in October, beginning with an equaliser in a 1–1 draw against defending champions Bayern Munich at the Allianz Arena on 1 October. Modeste scored a brace in a 2–1 victory against Ingolstadt on 15 October to take the outright Bundesliga goal scoring lead with 7 goals, after nearly missing the game when he sustained an ankle injury in training. After scoring in Köln's first loss of the season, coming at Hertha BSC on 22 October, Modeste scored an extra-time winner against former club Hoffenheim in the second round of the Pokal the following week. On 30 October, Modeste scored his first hat trick of the season despite missing a penalty, coming against Hamburg in a 3–0 win, increasing his league-leading goal total to 11.

=== Tianjin Quanjian ===
Modeste was linked with Chinese Super League side Tianjin Quanjian in 2017 mid-year transfer window. However, 1. FC Köln officially terminated discussions on 28 June 2017 while the two clubs failed to agree on certain terms during negotiations. On 12 July, it was reported that Modeste was loaned to Tianjin Quanjian on a two-year long deal for €6 million, with an option to buy for an extra €29 million at the end. On 15 July 2017, Tianjin Quanjian announced the signing of Modeste. According to another press release, Modeste signed a 3 1/2-year contract, until the end of year 2020.

=== Return to 1. FC Köln ===
In August 2018, Modeste went AWOL and returned to Germany. On 17 November, he was given a contract to return to 1. FC Köln until 2023. Modeste also sued Tianjin Quanjian to FIFA in order to cancel the player contract, which the Chinese club made a counter-sue.

==== Loan to Saint-Étienne ====
On 1 February 2021, Köln announced that Modeste would join Ligue 1 club AS Saint-Étienne on a loan deal until the end of the season.

=== Borussia Dortmund ===
On 8 August 2022, Borussia Dortmund announced the arrival of Modeste in a tweet, "Bienvenue Tony!" from 1. FC Köln on a one-year contract to replace Sébastien Haller whilst Haller fought cancer. The 34-year-old forward was assigned the number 20. On 8 October, he scored a 95th-minute equalizer in Der Klassiker against Bayern Munich in the Bundesliga to make the score 2–2.

On 29 May 2023, Dortmund announced the departure of five players, including Modeste.

=== Al Ahly ===
On 11 September 2023, Modeste joined Egyptian club Al Ahly by signing a one-year contract with an option for a further season. A month later, on 11 November, he scored his first goal in a 1–1 away draw against El Gouna. On 28 December, he won his first title at the club, by scoring the third goal in a 4–2 victory over Modern Future after extra time in the Egyptian Super Cup. On 1 July 2024, he departed the club after his contract concluded.

=== CF Intercity ===
On 3 February 2025, Modeste joined Spanish club CF Intercity.

== Personal life ==
His father Guy Modeste was also a footballer. Anthony is of Martiniquais descent.

== Career statistics ==
As of match played 28 June 2024

Appearances and goals by club, season and competition
Club	Season	League			National cup (Note: Includes Coupe de France, Coupe de la Ligue, DFB-Pokal, Chinese FA Cup, Egypt Cup)		League cup (Note: Includes Coupe de la Ligue)		Continental		Other		Total	
Club	Season	Division	Apps	Goals	Apps	Goals	Apps	Goals	Apps	Goals	Apps	Goals	Apps	Goals
Nice	2007–08	Ligue 1	20	1	1	0	1	0	—		—		22	1
Nice	2008–09	Ligue 1	22	2	4	1	1	1	—		—		27	4
Nice	Total		42	3	5	1	2	1	—		—		49	5
Angers (loan)	2009–10	Ligue 2	37	20	3	1	1	0	—		—		41	21
Bordeaux	2010–11	Ligue 1	37	10	2	1	2	1	—		—		41	12
Bordeaux	2011–12	Ligue 1	15	3	1	0	1	0	—		—		17	3
Bordeaux	Total		52	13	3	1	3	1	—		—		58	15
Blackburn Rovers (loan)	2011–12	Premier League	9	0	0	0	—		—		—		9	0
Bastia (loan)	2012–13	Ligue 1	36	15	0	0	2	2	—		—		38	17
1899 Hoffenheim	2013–14	Bundesliga	29	12	4	2	—		—		—		33	14
1899 Hoffenheim	2014–15	Bundesliga	26	7	3	2	—		—		—		29	9
1899 Hoffenheim	Total		55	19	7	4	—		—		—		62	23
1. FC Köln	2015–16	Bundesliga	34	15	2	3	—		—		—		36	18
1. FC Köln	2016–17	Bundesliga	34	25	3	2	—		—		—		37	27
1. FC Köln	Total		68	40	5	5	—		—		—		73	45
Tianjin Quanjian	2017	Chinese Super League	8	7	0	0	—		—		—		8	7
Tianjin Quanjian	2018	Chinese Super League	12	4	1	0	—		8 (Note: Appearances in AFC Champions League)	5	—		21	9
Tianjin Quanjian	Total		20	11	1	0	—		8	5	—		29	16
1. FC Köln	2018–19	2. Bundesliga	10	6	0	0	—		—		—		10	6
1. FC Köln	2019–20	Bundesliga	27	4	2	0	—		—		—		29	4
1. FC Köln	2020–21	Bundesliga	8	0	1	1	—		—		—		9	1
1. FC Köln	2021–22	Bundesliga	32	20	3	3	—		—		—		35	23
1. FC Köln	2022–23	Bundesliga	0	0	1	0	—		—		—		1	0
1. FC Köln	Total		77	30	7	4	—		—		—		84	34
Saint-Étienne (loan)	2020–21	Ligue 1	7	0	1	0	—		—		—		8	0
Borussia Dortmund	2022–23	Bundesliga	19	2	2	0	—		7 (Note: Appearances in UEFA Champions League)	0	—		28	2
Al Ahly	2022–23	Egyptian Premier League	0	0	2	1	—		—		—		2	1
Al Ahly	2023–24	Egyptian Premier League	17	4	0	0	—		9 (Note: Three appearances in African Football League, six appearances in CAF Champions League)	0	3 (Note: One appearance in FIFA Club World Cup, two appearances and one goal in Egyptian Super Cup)	1	29	5
Al Ahly	Total		17	4	2	1	—		9	0	3	1	31	6
Career total			438	156	36	17	8	4	24	5	3	1	509	180

== Honours ==
1. FC Köln

- 2. Bundesliga: 2018–19

Al Ahly

- Egyptian Premier League: 2023–24
- Egypt Cup: 2022–23
- Egyptian Super Cup: 2023–24
- CAF Champions League: 2023–24
