= Mark Uth =

German footballer (born 1991)

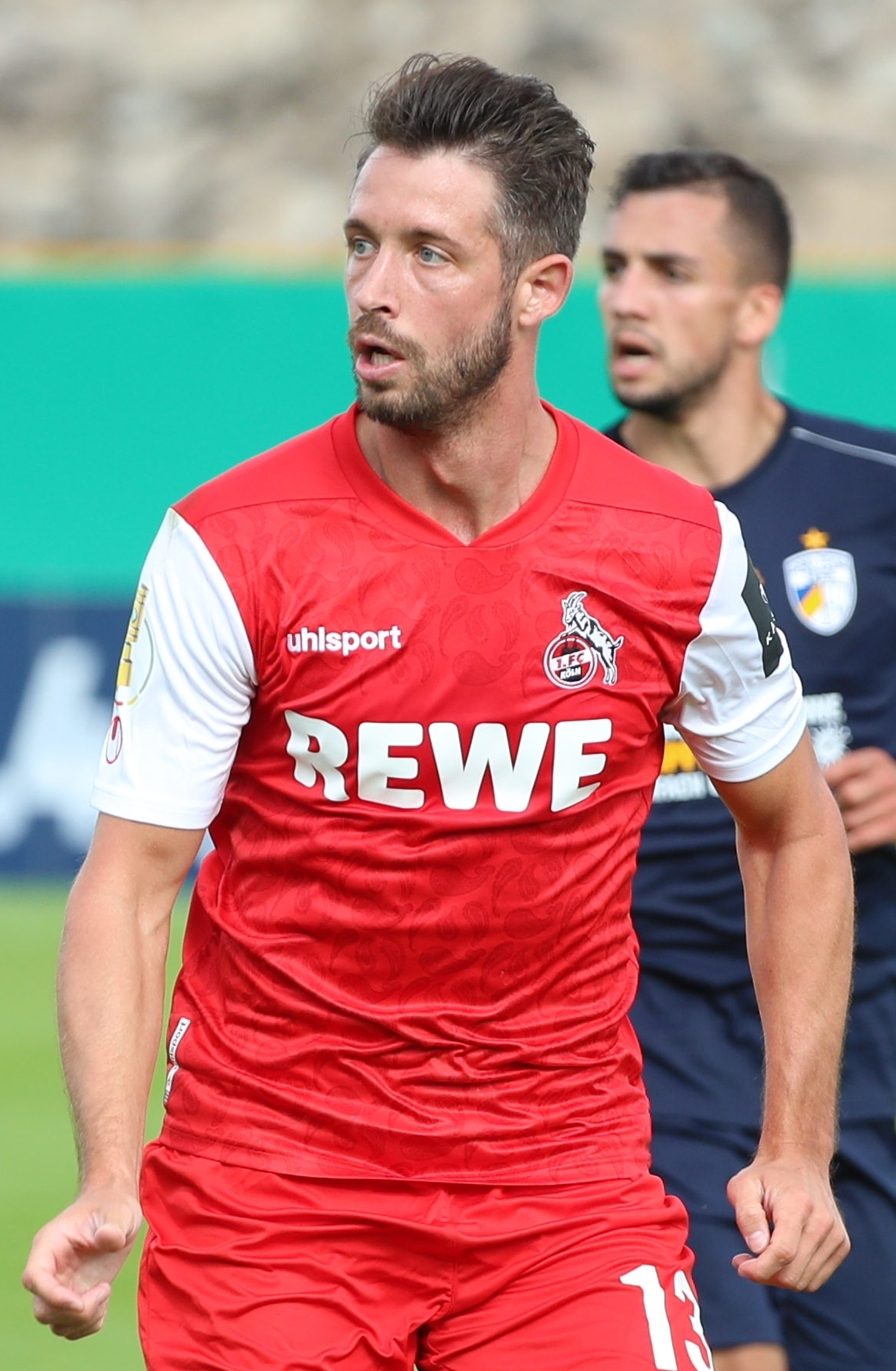
- Uth with 1. FC Köln in 2021

Personal information
- Full name: Mark-Alexander Uth
- Date of birth: 24 August 1991 (age 35)
- Place of birth: Cologne, Germany
- Height: 1.85 m (6 ft 1 in)
- Position: Forward

Youth career
- –2004: TuS Langel
- 2004–2007: 1. FC Köln
- 2007–2009: FC Viktoria Köln
- 2009–2010: 1. FC Köln

Senior career*
Years	Team	Apps	(Gls)
2010–2012	1. FC Köln II	41	(16)
2012–2015	SC Heerenveen	35	(15)
2013–2014	→ Heracles Almelo (loan)	28	(8)
2015–2018	1899 Hoffenheim	78	(29)
2016	1899 Hoffenheim II	1	(1)
2018–2021	Schalke 04	48	(5)
2019	Schalke 04 II	1	(0)
2020	→ 1. FC Köln (loan)	15	(5)
2021–2025	1. FC Köln	55	(6)

International career
2010	Germany U20	1	(0)
2018	Germany	1	(0)
- * Club domestic league appearances and goals

Mark-Alexander Uth (born 24 August 1991) is a German former professional footballer who played as a forward. He also made one appearance with the German national team.

== Club career ==
=== Youth ===
Uth started playing football at TuS Langel, a small club based in the south of Cologne. Having joined 1. FC Köln in 2004, he left in 2007 for Viktoria Köln.

=== 1. FC Köln II ===
In 2009, he returned to 1. FC Köln and was promoted to the second team playing in the fourth-tier Regionalliga West in 2010. After good performances there, he became a member of the first team's squad for the 2011–12 Bundesliga season, but did not make an appearance. Because the club had several further young strikers, it was decided that Uth could leave the club.

=== SC Heerenveen ===
In May 2012, it was announced that Uth had signed for SC Heerenveen on a three-year contract.

He scored a hat-trick while playing on loan for Heracles Almelo in their match against RKC Waalwijk on 28 September 2013.

=== 1899 Hoffenheim ===
He signed for Bundesliga side 1899 Hoffenheim in July 2015. Depending on the source, the transfer fee paid to Heerenveen was reported as €2 to 3 million.

=== Schalke 04 ===
In January 2018, it was announced that Uth would move to Schalke 04 on a free transfer in summer. He signed a contract until 2022.

In January 2020, it was announced that Köln had signed Uth from Schalke 04 on loan for the rest of the 2019–20 season.

=== Return to 1. FC Köln ===
Uth again returned to 1. FC Köln in summer 2021, signing on a two-year contract after Schalke's relegation from the Bundesliga.

On 4 May 2025, Uth announced that he would retire from professional football at the end of the current season. On 18 May 2025, Uth played his last professional career game and scored a goal against Kaiserslautern at the 2024–25 2. Bundesliga final round.

== International career ==
Uth has earned one cap for the Germany U20 team. In a 3–2 victory versus Switzerland on 6 September 2010 he was put in for Cenk Tosun in the 65th minute.

On 5 October 2018, Uth was called up to the Germany national team for the first time, featuring in the squad for the UEFA Nations League matches against the Netherlands and France.

== Career statistics ==
=== Club ===
As of match played 18 May 2024

Appearances and goals by club, season and competition
Club	Season	League			Cup		Europe		Other (Note: Includes Eredivisie play-offs)		Total	
Club	Season	Division	Apps	Goals	Apps	Goals	Apps	Goals	Apps	Goals	Apps	Goals
1. FC Köln II	2009–10	Regionalliga West	3	0	–		–		–		3	0
1. FC Köln II	2010–11	Regionalliga West	23	7	–		–		–		23	7
1. FC Köln II	2011–12	Regionalliga West	15	9	–		–		–		15	9
1. FC Köln II	Total		41	16	–		–		–		41	16
SC Heerenveen	2012–13	Eredivisie	3	0	0	0	–		2	1	5	1
SC Heerenveen	2014–15	Eredivisie	32	15	1	0	–		4	5	37	20
SC Heerenveen	Total		35	15	1	0	–		6	6	42	21
Heracles Almelo (loan)	2013–14	Eredivisie	28	8	3	2	–		–		31	10
1899 Hoffenheim	2015–16	Bundesliga	25	8	0	0	–		–		25	8
1899 Hoffenheim	2016–17	Bundesliga	22	7	1	1	–		–		23	8
1899 Hoffenheim	2017–18	Bundesliga	31	14	2	0	5	3	–		38	17
1899 Hoffenheim	Total		78	29	3	1	5	3	–		86	33
1899 Hoffenheim II	2016–17	Regionalliga Südwest	1	1	–		–		–		1	1
Schalke 04	2018–19	Bundesliga	20	2	4	1	5	1	–		29	4
Schalke 04	2019–20	Bundesliga	8	0	1	0	–		–		9	0
Schalke 04	2020–21	Bundesliga	20	3	1	0	–		–		21	3
Schalke 04	Total		48	5	6	1	5	1	–		59	7
Schalke 04 II	2019–20	Regionalliga West	1	0	–		–		–		1	0
1. FC Köln (loan)	2019–20	Bundesliga	15	5	–		–		–		15	5
1. FC Köln	2021–22	Bundesliga	30	5	3	0	—		—		33	5
1. FC Köln	2022–23	Bundesliga	3	0	1	1	1 (Note: Appearance in UEFA Europa Conference League)	0	—		5	1
1. FC Köln	2023–24	Bundesliga	11	0	2	1	—		—		13	1
1. FC Köln	Total		59	10	6	2	1	0	—		66	12
Career total			291	84	19	6	11	4	6	6	325	100

=== International ===
As of 13 October 2018

Appearances and goals by national team and year
National team	Year	Apps	Goals
Germany	2018	1	0
Total		1	0

== Honours ==
1. FC Köln

- 2. Bundesliga: 2024–25
