= Jan Thielmann =

German footballer

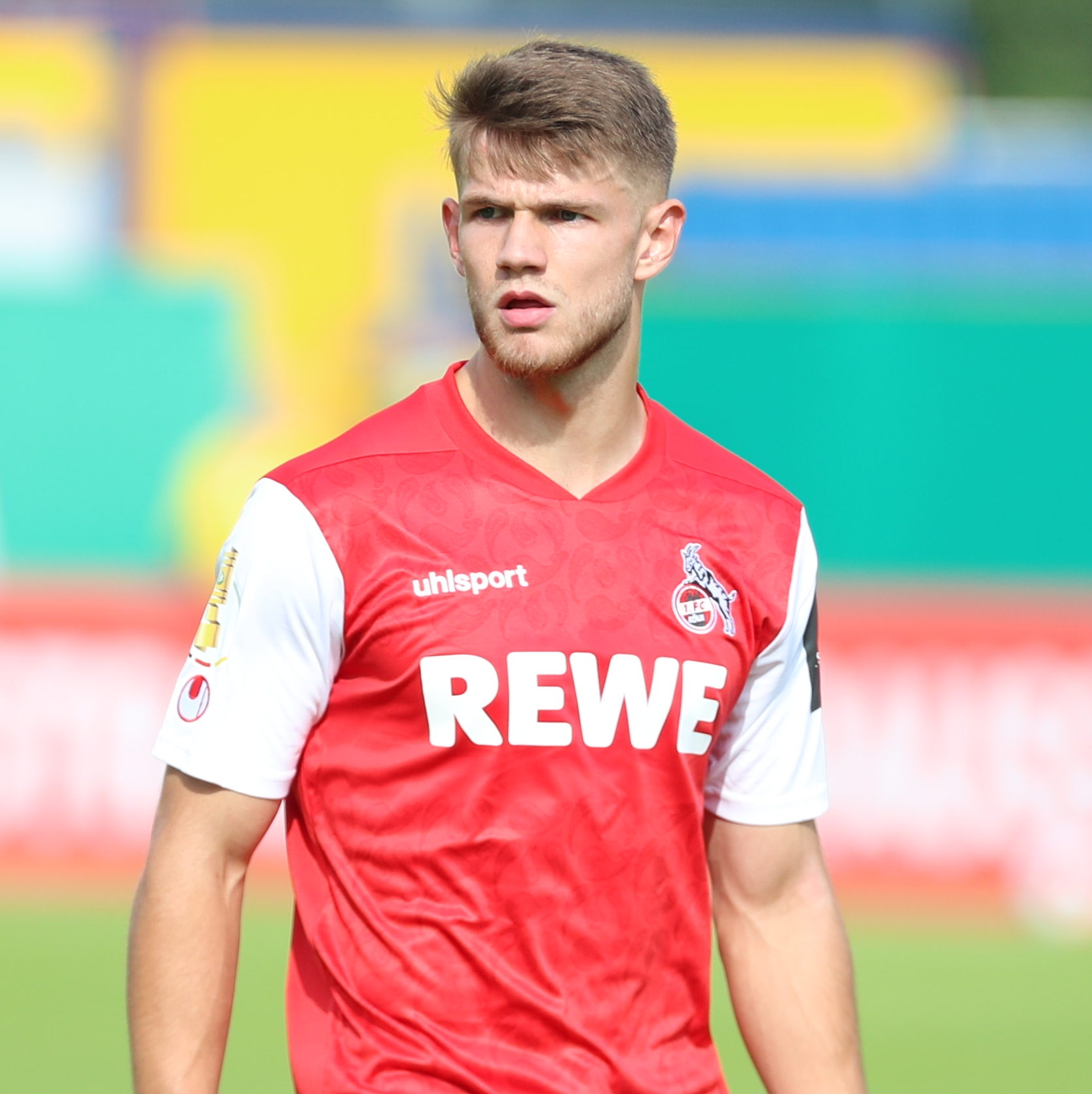
- Thielmann in 2021

Personal information
- Full name: Jan Uwe Thielmann
- Date of birth: 26 May 2002 (age 24)
- Place of birth: Föhren, Rhineland-Palatinate, Germany
- Height: 1.78 m (5 ft 10 in)
- Position: Right winger

Team information
- Current team: 1. FC Köln
- Number: 29

Youth career
- –2015: JSG Hetzerath/SV Föhren/Bekond
- 2015–2017: Eintracht Trier
- 2017–2020: 1. FC Köln

Senior career*
Years	Team	Apps	(Gls)
2019–	1. FC Köln	169	(13)
2020	1. FC Köln II	2	(0)

International career^{‡}
2017	Germany U15	2	(0)
2018	Germany U16	3	(0)
2018–2019	Germany U17	10	(2)
2020	Germany U19	1	(0)
2021–2025	Germany U21	20	(1)
Medal record
Men's football
Representing Germany
UEFA European Under-21 Championship
Runner-up	2025 Slovakia
- * Club domestic league appearances and goals as of 24 October 2026 ‡ National team caps and goals as of 12:04, 19 June 2025 (UTC)

Jan Uwe Thielmann (born 26 May 2002) is a German professional footballer who plays as a right winger for Bundesliga club 1. FC Köln.

== Club career ==
=== 1. FC Köln ===
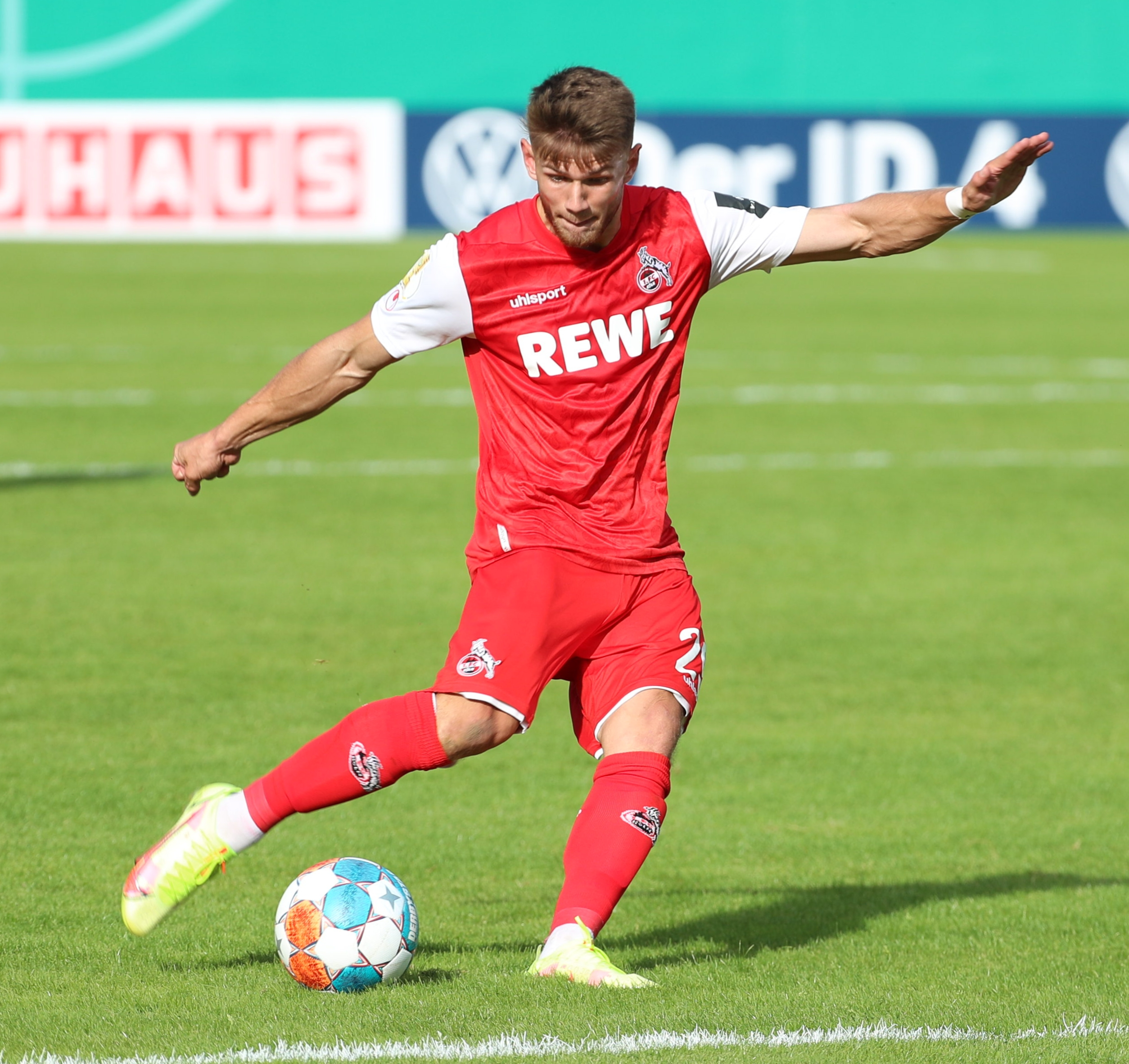
Jan Thielmann playing for 1. FC Köln in 2021

In his youth years, Thielmann first played in the then youth game community Hetzerath / Föhren / Bekond and switched to the youth team of Eintracht Trier for the 2014–15 season. For the 2017–18 season, he moved to the U17s of 1. FC Köln. He played 24 games for the team and won the championship with them in June 2019 after a 3–2 win over Borussia Dortmund.

In the 2019–20 season, Thielmann was promoted to the U19s. He made his professional debut with 1. FC Köln in a 2–0 Bundesliga win over Bayer 04 Leverkusen on 14 December 2019. In doing so, he became the first footballer born in 2002 to play in the Bundesliga, and was the second youngest league debutant for his club after Yann Aurel Bisseck.

After a convincing debut, manager Markus Gisdol continued to start Thielmann in games against Eintracht Frankfurt and Werder Bremen. In January 2020, Thielmann signed his first professional contract. The collaboration between him and 1. FC Köln was extended until 30 June 2022. "He is very, very advanced for his age, both physically and physically, and he also has a very good understanding of the game. We trust him that he will hold his ground in the long term," said sporting director Horst Heldt in justification go the contract extension.

On 5 December 2020, Thielmann scored his first goal as a professional in a 2–2 draw against VfL Wolfsburg. On 20 January 2021, he scored an injury time winner against Schalke 04 in a relegation six-pointer. On 30 April 2021, the club announced that Thielmann's contract had been extended until 2024. In June 2022, he was nominated for the Golden Boy, an award given to the best under-21 player in European football.

== Career statistics ==
As of match played 27 October 2026

Appearances and goals by club, season and competition
Club	Season	League			DFB-Pokal		Europe		Other		Total	
Club	Season	Division	Apps	Goals	Apps	Goals	Apps	Goals	Apps	Goals	Apps	Goals
1. FC Köln	2019–20	Bundesliga	12	0	0	0	—		—		12	0
1. FC Köln	2020–21	Bundesliga	24	2	2	0	—		—		26	2
1. FC Köln	2021–22	Bundesliga	29	3	3	0	—		—		32	3
1. FC Köln	2022–23	Bundesliga	23	2	1	0	5 (Note: Appearances in UEFA Europa Conference League)	0	—		30	2
1. FC Köln	2023–24	Bundesliga	22	1	1	1	—		—		23	2
1. FC Köln	2024–25	2. Bundesliga	30	2	4	0	—		—		34	2
1. FC Köln	2025–26	Bundesliga	26	3	1	0	—		—		27	3
1. FC Köln	2026–27	Bundesliga	3	0	2	0	—		—		5	0
1. FC Köln	Total		169	13	14	1	5	0	—		188	14
Köln II	2020–21	Regionalliga West	1	0	—		—		—		1	0
Köln II	2023–24	Regionalliga West	1	0	—		—		—		1	0
Köln II	Total		2	0	—		—		—		2	0
Career total			171	13	14	1	5	0	0	0	190	14

== Honours ==
1.FC Koln

- 2. Bundesliga: 2024–25

Germany U21

- UEFA European Under-21 Championship runner-up: 2025
