= Sebastiaan Bornauw =

Belgian footballer (born 1999)

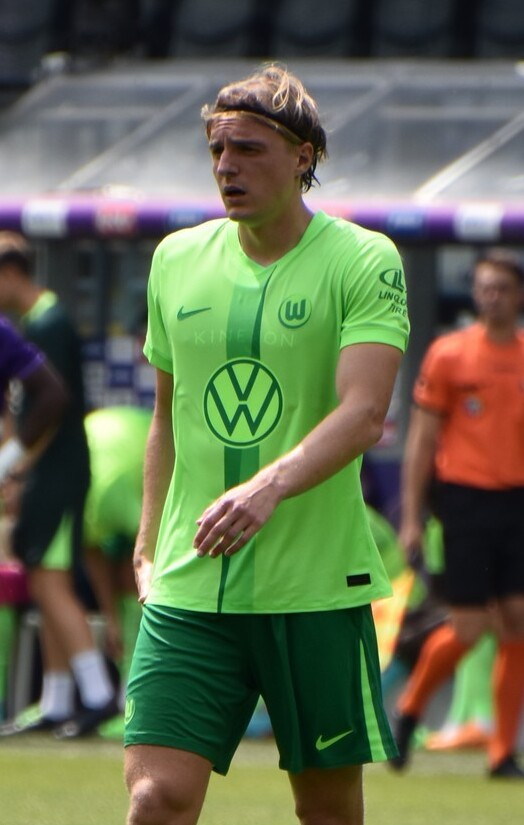
- Bornauw with VfL Wolfsburg in 2024

Personal information
- Full name: Sebastiaan Bornauw
- Date of birth: 22 March 1999 (age 27)
- Place of birth: Wemmel, Belgium
- Height: 1.91 m (6 ft 3 in)
- Position: Centre-back

Team information
- Current team: Hamburger SV (on loan from Leeds United)
- Number: 33

Youth career
- 2007–2008: Wydad
- 2008–2009: Dender
- 2009–2018: Anderlecht

Senior career*
Years	Team	Apps	(Gls)
2018–2019	Anderlecht	24	(1)
2019–2021	1. FC Köln	52	(7)
2021–2025	VfL Wolfsburg	88	(4)
2025–	Leeds United	12	(0)
2026–	→ Hamburger SV (loan)	5	(0)

International career
2014	Belgium U15	3	(0)
2015	Belgium U16	7	(0)
2015–2016	Belgium U17	16	(1)
2017	Belgium U18	1	(0)
2017–2018	Belgium U19	9	(1)
2019–2020	Belgium U21	8	(1)
2020–2023	Belgium	4	(0)
- * Club domestic league appearances and goals as of 17:30, 24 October 2026 (UTC)

Sebastiaan Bornauw (born 22 March 1999) is a Belgian professional footballer who plays as a centre-back for Bundesliga club Hamburger SV, on loan from Premier League club Leeds United.

== Club career ==
=== Youth ===
Bornauw began his club career - unusually for a European player - in the youth ranks of Moroccan First Division club Wydad Casablanca when his father was working there.

=== Anderlecht ===
Bornauw made his professional debut for Anderlecht in a 4–1 Belgian Pro League win over Kortrijk on 28 July 2018, at the age of 19. He played the full game. Bornauw would go on to become a key defender for Anderlecht, despite his young age. In total, he played in 24 league games and he scored one goal as a defender for Anderlecht in his debut season.

=== 1. FC Köln ===
On 6 August 2019, Bornauw joined 1. FC Köln on a five-year deal. He scored his first Bundesliga goal on 20 October 2019 against SC Paderborn. In his first season at 1. FC Köln, Bornauw established himself as a regular starter and became a key player for the club.

=== VfL Wolfsburg ===
On 16 July 2021, Köln announced that the club had transferred Bornauw to VfL Wolfsburg, where he signed a contract until 2026. He scored his first goal for Wolfsburg on 26 February 2022 in a 2–2 away draw against Borussia Mönchengladbach.

=== Leeds United ===
On 1 July 2025, Bornauw signed for Premier League club Leeds United on a four-year deal, for a fee of £5,100,000. He made his Premier League debut on 3 December 2025, in the match against Chelsea, coming on as a late substitute for Gabriel Gudmundsson.

==== Loan to Hamburger SV ====
On 19 August 2026, Bornauw returned to Germany and joined Bundesliga club Hamburger SV, on a loan for the 2026–27 season.

== International career ==
Bornauw debuted with the Belgium national football team in a 1–1 friendly draw with Ivory Coast on 8 October 2020.

== Career statistics ==
=== Club ===
As of match played 27 October 2026

Appearances and goals by club, season and competition
Club	Season	League			National Cup (Note: Includes Belgian Cup, DFB-Pokal, FA Cup)		League cup (Note: Includes EFL Cup)		Europe		Other		Total	
Club	Season	Division	Apps	Goals	Apps	Goals	Apps	Goals	Apps	Goals	Apps	Goals	Apps	Goals
Anderlecht	2018–19	Belgian Pro League	23	1	1	0	—		4 (Note: Appearances in UEFA Europa League)	0	—		28	1
Anderlecht	2019–20	Belgian Pro League	1	0	—		—		—		—		1	0
Anderlecht	Total		24	1	1	0	—		4	0	—		29	1
1. FC Köln	2019–20	Bundesliga	28	6	1	0	—		—		—		29	6
1. FC Köln	2020–21	Bundesliga	24	1	2	0	—		—		2 (Note: Appearances in Bundesliga relegation play-offs)	0	28	1
1. FC Köln	Total		52	7	3	0	—		—		2	0	57	7
VfL Wolfsburg	2021–22	Bundesliga	27	1	1	0	—		3 (Note: Appearances in UEFA Champions League)	0	—		31	1
VfL Wolfsburg	2022–23	Bundesliga	26	1	2	0	—		—		—		28	1
VfL Wolfsburg	2023–24	Bundesliga	20	0	1	0	—		—		—		21	0
VfL Wolfsburg	2024–25	Bundesliga	15	2	1	0	—		—		—		16	2
VfL Wolfsburg	Total		88	4	5	0	—		3	0	—		96	4
Leeds United	2025–26	Premier League	12	0	4	0	1	0	—		—		17	0
Hamburger SV (loan)	2026–27	Bundesliga	5	0	2	0	—		—		—		7	0
Career total			178	12	15	0	1	0	7	0	2	0	206	12

=== International ===
Appearances and goals by national team and year
National team	Year	Apps	Goals
Belgium	2020	2	0
Belgium	2022	1	0
Belgium	2023	1	0
Total		4	0
