= Guy Modeste =

French footballer (1954–2018)

Personal information
- Date of birth: 10 August 1954
- Place of birth: Saint-Pierre, Martinique
- Date of death: 19 December 2018 (aged 64)
- Place of death: Paris, France
- Height: 1.84 m (6 ft 0 in)
- Position: Libero

Senior career*
Years	Team	Apps	(Gls)
1972–1979	Saint-Étienne	1	(0)
1976–1977	Saint-Étienne B		
1977–1978	→ Cannes (loan)	34	(3)
1979–1981	Cannes	60	(5)
1981–1982	Châteauroux	23	(1)
1984–1986	Fréjus		
Total		118	(9)
- * Club domestic league appearances and goals

Guy Modeste (10 August 1954 – 19 December 2018) was a French professional footballer.

== Early and personal life ==
Born in Saint-Pierre, Martinique, Modeste's brothers Sully, Floriva and Roger are also footballers. His son Anthony is also a footballer.

== Career ==
A libero, Modeste joined Saint-Étienne in 1972. He played for the B team in the 1976–77 season, and spent time on loan at Cannes. He made his senior debut for Saint-Étienne in the 1978–79 season, and later played for Cannes, Châteauroux and Fréjus.

== Later life and death ==
He died in Paris from cancer at the age of 64.
