= Noah Katterbach =

German footballer

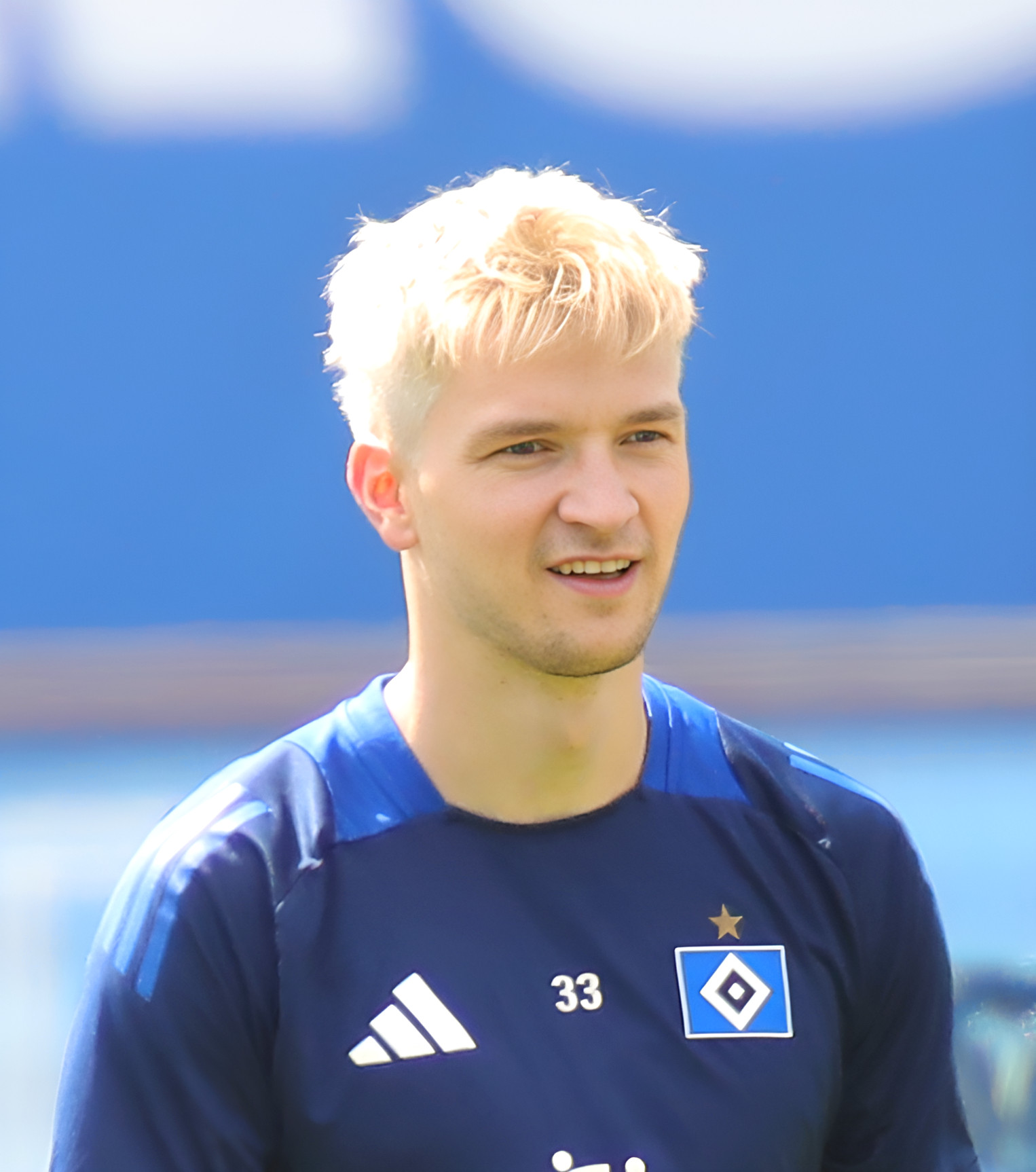
- Noah Katterbach in 2025

Personal information
- Date of birth: 13 April 2001 (age 25)
- Place of birth: Simmerath, Germany
- Height: 1.80 m (5 ft 11 in)
- Position: Left-back

Team information
- Current team: Eintracht Braunschweig (on loan from Hamburger SV)
- Number: 3

Youth career
- 2004—2008: TuS DJK Dreiborn
- 2008–2019: 1. FC Köln

Senior career*
| Years | Team | Apps | (Gls) |
| 2019–2024 | 1. FC Köln II | 29 | (1) |
| 2019–2024 | 1. FC Köln | 40 | (0) |
| 2022 | → Basel (loan) | 21 | (1) |
| 2023 | → Hamburger SV (loan) | 11 | (0) |
| 2024– | Hamburger SV | 14 | (1) |
| 2025–2026 | Hamburger SV II | 8 | (0) |
| 2026– | → Eintracht Braunschweig (loan) | 0 | (0) |

International career^{‡}
| 2017 | Germany U16 | 2 | (0) |
| 2017 | Germany U17 | 12 | (2) |
| 2018 | Germany U18 | 3 | (0) |
| 2019 | Germany U19 | 5 | (0) |
| 2020 | Germany U20 | 1 | (0) |
| 2021–2023 | Germany U21 | 12 | (1) |
- * Club domestic league appearances and goals as of 19:04, 3 July 2026 (UTC) ‡ National team caps and goals as of 18:28, 28 March 2023 (UTC)

Noah Katterbach (born 13 April 2001) is a German professional footballer who plays as a left-back for 2. Bundesliga club Eintracht Braunschweig, on loan from Hamburger SV. He has won the Fritz Walter Medal in Gold in two consecutive year groups (under-17 and under-19).

== Club career ==
=== 1. FC Köln ===
Katterbach spent the majority of his youth career at 1. FC Köln, starting at the under-8 level. In 2018, he was awarded the Fritz Walter Medal in Gold, honouring the best German player in the under-17 age group.

On 5 October 2019, he made his professional debut for the club in a 1–1 draw against Schalke 04, making him the youngest player to appear in the Bundesliga that year. During the 2019–20 season, Katterbach established himself in the club's first team squad and made 18 league appearances. In May 2020, it was announced that he had signed a contract extension keeping him at Köln until 2024.

On 19 August 2020, Katterbach was awarded the Fritz Walter Medal in Gold for the second time, this time honouring him as the best German player in the under-19 age group.

==== Loan to Basel ====
On 18 January 2022, Köln announced on their website that they had transferred Katterbach to the Swiss Super League club Basel.

On the same day, Basel announced in a press-release that Katterbach had signed a one calendar year contract with them, including the option of a definitive transfer. On 30 January, after playing in three test games, Katterbach made his domestic league debut in an away game at Swissporarena as Basel played against Luzern. He was shown a yellow card in the 52nd minute, but also gave the final pass in the 85th minute as Darian Males scored the team's second goal, as FCB achieved a 3–0 victory. He scored his first goal for the club in the home game in the St. Jakob-Park on 19 February 2022. It was the last goal of the game as Basel won 3–0 against Lausanne-Sport.

At the end of the loan period, the club decided not to activate the take-over option on the player. During his time with the club Katterbach played a total of 42 games for Basel scoring the afore mentioned one league goal. 21 of these games were in the Swiss Super League, two in the Swiss Cup, ten in the UEFA Europa Conference League and nine were friendly games.

==== Loan to Hamburger SV ====
On 17 January 2023, Hamburger SV announced on the club's website that they had signed Katterbach on a loan contract until the end of the 2022–23 season.

=== Hamburger SV ===
On 31 January 2024, Katterbach returned to Hamburger SV on a long-term contract.

==== Loan to Eintracht Braunschweig ====
In the summer of 2026, Katterbach joined 2. Bundesliga club Eintracht Braunschweig on a season-long loan, with Braunschweig holding the option to sign Katterbach permanently.

== International career ==
Katterbach has represented Germany at several youth levels, beginning with the U 16 team in 2017. Most recently, he played for his country's U 20 squad.

== Career statistics ==
As of end of 2025–26 season

Appearances and goals by club, season and competition
| Club | Season | League | | | Cup | | Europe | | Other | | Total | |
| Club | Season | Division | Apps | Goals | Apps | Goals | Apps | Goals | Apps | Goals | Apps | Goals |
|---|---|---|---|---|---|---|---|---|---|---|---|---|
| 1. FC Köln II | 2019–20 | Regionalliga West | 5 | 0 | — | | — | | — | | 5 | 0 |
| 1. FC Köln II | 2020–21 | Regionalliga West | 1 | 0 | — | | — | | — | | 1 | 0 |
| 1. FC Köln II | 2021–22 | Regionalliga West | 18 | 1 | — | | — | | — | | 18 | 1 |
| 1. FC Köln II | 2023–24 | Regionalliga West | 5 | 0 | — | | — | | — | | 5 | 0 |
| 1. FC Köln II | Total | | 29 | 1 | — | | — | | — | | 29 | 1 |
| 1. FC Köln | 2019–20 | Bundesliga | 18 | 0 | 1 | 0 | — | | — | | 19 | 0 |
| 1. FC Köln | 2020–21 | Bundesliga | 21 | 0 | 3 | 0 | — | | 1 (Note: Appearance in Bundesliga play-offs) | 0 | 25 | 0 |
| 1. FC Köln | 2021–22 | Bundesliga | 1 | 0 | 0 | 0 | — | | — | | 1 | 0 |
| 1. FC Köln | Total | | 40 | 0 | 4 | 0 | 0 | 0 | 1 | 0 | 45 | 0 |
| Basel (loan) | 2021–22 | Swiss Super League | 15 | 1 | 0 | 0 | 0 | 0 | 0 | 0 | 15 | 1 |
| Basel (loan) | 2022–23 | Swiss Super League | 6 | 0 | 2 | 0 | 8 (Note: Appearances in UEFA Europa Conference League) | 0 | 0 | 0 | 16 | 0 |
| Basel (loan) | Total | | 21 | 1 | 2 | 0 | 8 | 0 | 0 | 0 | 31 | 1 |
| Hamburger SV (loan) | 2022–23 | 2. Bundesliga | 11 | 0 | — | | — | | — | | 11 | 0 |
| Hamburger SV | 2023–24 | 2. Bundesliga | 6 | 0 | 0 | 0 | — | | — | | 6 | 0 |
| Hamburger SV | 2024–25 | 2. Bundesliga | 8 | 1 | 2 | 0 | — | | — | | 10 | 1 |
| Hamburger SV | 2025–26 | Bundesliga | 0 | 0 | 0 | 0 | — | | — | | 0 | 0 |
| Hamburger SV | Total | | 14 | 1 | 2 | 0 | — | | — | | 16 | 1 |
| Hamburger SV II | 2025–26 | Regionalliga Nord | 8 | 0 | — | | — | | — | | 8 | 0 |
| Career total | | | 123 | 2 | 8 | 0 | 8 | 0 | 1 | 0 | 140 | 2 |

== Honours ==
Club

- 2. Bundesliga: 2018–19

Individual

- Fritz Walter Medal U17 Gold: 2018
- Fritz Walter Medal U19 Gold: 2020
