= Markus Gisdol =

German footballer and manager

- Gisdol coaching CSKA Sofia in 2026

Personal information
- Date of birth: 17 August 1969 (age 57)
- Place of birth: Geislingen an der Steige, West Germany
- Height: 1.84 m (6 ft 0 in)
- Position: Midfielder

Team information
- Current team: CSKA Sofia (manager)

Youth career
- SC Geislingen

Senior career*
Years	Team	Apps	(Gls)
1987–1990	SC Geislingen	70	(8)
1990–1992	SSV Reutlingen	30	(3)
1992–1993	SC Geislingen	33	(5)
1993–1994	1. FC Pforzheim	19	(2)
1994–1996	SpVgg Au/Iller	77	(20)
Total		229	(38)

Managerial career
- 1997–1999: TSG Salach
- 2000–2002: FTSV Kuchen
- 2002–2005: SC Geislingen
- 2005–2007: VfB Stuttgart II
- 2007: SG Sonnenhof Großaspach
- 2008–2009: SSV Ulm
- 2009–2011: TSG Hoffenheim II
- 2013–2015: TSG Hoffenheim
- 2016–2018: Hamburger SV
- 2019–2021: 1. FC Köln
- 2021–2022: Lokomotiv Moscow
- 2023–2024: Samsunspor
- 2025: Kayserispor
- 2026–: CSKA Sofia
- * Club domestic league appearances and goals

Markus Gisdol (born 17 August 1969) is a German football manager and former player, currently in charge of Bulgarian First League club CSKA Sofia.

== Managerial career ==
=== Early career ===
Gisdol had coaching stints at Sonnenhof Großaspach, SSV Ulm and other regional sides, before joining TSG Hoffenheim II in 2009. He won promotion into the Regionalliga Süd with the team before leaving to follow Ralf Rangnick to Schalke 04 in March 2011, becoming Rangnick's assistant. Gisdol also worked as assistant to Rangnick's replacement Huub Stevens before both Stevens and Gisdol were sacked in 2012.

=== TSG Hoffenheim ===
On 2 April 2013, Gisdol replaced Marco Kurz at TSG Hoffenheim. At the time, Hoffenheim were 17th in the Bundesliga, 4 points from safety. Gisdol's first match as a manager was a 3–0 win against relegation rivals Fortuna Düsseldorf. A comeback win against Borussia Dortmund on the final day of the season secured 16th place for Hoffenheim, and they went on to beat 1. FC Kaiserslautern in the relegation playoff to survive, in what was described as an 'astonishing escape'.

In his first full season as head coach, Hoffenheim finished 9th and reached the DFB-Pokal quarter final. Gisdol was praised for giving the team a clear identity, and an attacking style that saw them both score and concede over 70 goals in the league that season. On 16 April 2015 he renewed his contract when he signed a three-year extension. After an unsuccessful start of Hoffenheim's 2015–16 campaign, Gisdol was sacked on 26 October 2015. The team were 17th in the table having won just once.

=== Hamburger SV ===
On 25 September 2016, he replaced Bruno Labbadia as the head coach of Hamburger SV with a contract running until 30 June 2017. The contract was extended to 2019 on 22 March 2017. After saving Hamburg in the 2016–17 Bundesliga season from relegation, he went on a losing streak and was sacked on 21 January 2018, with club chairman Heribert Bruchhagen saying, "we believe that a new impulse is required urgently in order for us to achieve our goal of staying in the Bundesliga". Hamburg were eventually relegated from the Bundesliga for the very first time at the end of the season.

=== 1. FC Köln ===
On 18 November 2019, he was signed by 1. FC Köln. He started well at Köln, taking 24 points from his first 10 games as coach, which helped the club out of the relegation battle. Gisdol also successfully integrated young players into the first team, including Jan Thielmann, Noah Katterbach and Ismail Jakobs. On 5 August 2020, Gisdol's contract was extended until July 2023.

On 11 April 2021, after losing to Mainz 05, Gisdol was removed from his position as head coach.

=== Lokomotiv Moscow ===
On 10 October 2021, he was hired by Russian Premier League club Lokomotiv Moscow. Due to the Russian invasion of Ukraine, he resigned on 1 March 2022.

=== Samsunspor ===
In October 2023, he took over at Süper Lig side Samsunspor. At the time, Samsunspor were bottom of the table with only a single point. Under Gisdol, the team's form improved significantly, and the team rose to 13th in the table.

== Coaching record ==
As of 22 November 2025

Team	From	To	Record					
Team	From	To	G	W	D	L	Win %	Ref.
SC Geislingen	1 July 2002	30 June 2005	—					
Sonnenhof Großaspach	1 July 2007	10 November 2007	14	6	4	4	42.86	
Ulm 1846	1 July 2008	30 June 2009	34	13	14	7	38.24	
TSG Hoffenheim II	1 July 2009	23 March 2011	57	33	13	11	57.89	
TSG Hoffenheim	2 April 2013	26 October 2015	96	35	24	37	36.46	
Hamburger SV	25 September 2016	21 January 2018	52	16	10	26	30.77	
1. FC Köln	18 November 2019	11 April 2021	54	15	14	25	27.78	
Lokomotiv Moscow	16 October 2021	1 March 2022	12	3	3	6	25.00	
Samsunspor	10 October 2023	30 June 2024	33	13	9	11	39.39	
Kayserispor	11 June 2025	7 October 2025	8	0	5	3	0.00	
CSKA Sofia	29 September 2026	Present	9	4	3	2	44.44	
Total			369	138	99	132	37.40	—
