= SV Auersmacher =

German football club

- Full name: Sportverein Auersmacher e.V.
- Founded: 1919
- League: Oberliga Rheinland-Pfalz/Saar (V)
- 2025–26: Oberliga Rheinland-Pfalz/Saar, 12th of 18
Home colours	Away colours

SV Auersmacher is a German football club from the Auersmacher quarter of Kleinblittersdorf, Saarland. It was established on 15 July 1919 as Fußballclub Auersmacher.

== History ==
Worker's clubs or clubs with religious affiliations were viewed as politically unpalatable by the Nazi regime and were banned. As a result, the memberships of Arbeiter-SV 1926 Auersmacher (banned in 1933) and DJK Concordia 1929 Auersmacher (banned in 1934) became part of FC on 6 January 1935. In 1937 Turnverein 1894 Auersmacher joined FC to create VfL Auersmacher which was active until the end of World War II. Following the war occupying Allied authorities banned most organizations in the country including sports and football clubs.

The club was re-established on 6 April 1946 as SV Auersmacher. Part of the membership left to form SV Sitterswald in 1948 and on 9 January 1954 the club split again as TV 1894 Auersmacher was reformed.

The Auersmacher side first came to note in 1971 when they advanced to play in the third division Amateurliga Saarland where they would compete until sent down in 1979. During their eight-year-long stint there the club's best result was a fourth-place finish in 1977. SV next appeared in the Oberliga Südwest (IV) from 1995 to 1998 and were relegated after losing a playoff to SG Betzdorf (0:3). Since then the club has played fifth and sixth tier football in the Verbandsliga Saarland generally earning upper table finishes. The club returned to the Oberliga after winning the title in the Verbandsliga in 2009 but was relegated again in 2011.

The club took part in the opening rounds of the DFB-Pokal (German Cup) tournament in 1976 and 1980.

== Honours ==
- 2. Amateurliga Saar-West (IV)
  - Champions: 1971
- Verbandsliga Saarland (V–VI)
  - Champions: 1995, 2009
- Saarland Cup
  - Winners: 1979

== Stadium ==
Since 1974, SV has played its home matches in the Saar-Blies-Stadion which has a capacity of 3,500.
