= Jan-Christoph Bartels =

German footballer

Personal information
- Date of birth: 13 January 1999 (age 27)
- Place of birth: Wiesbaden, Germany
- Height: 1.88 m (6 ft 2 in)
- Position: Goalkeeper

Team information
- Current team: DAC 1904 Dunajská Streda
- Number: 13

Youth career
- 2002–2008: TSG Schwabenheim
- 2008–2017: Mainz 05
- 2017–2018: 1. FC Köln

Senior career*
Years	Team	Apps	(Gls)
2018–	1. FC Köln II	17	(0)
2018–2020	1. FC Köln	0	(0)
2019–2020	→ Wehen Wiesbaden (loan)	1	(0)
2020–2025	Waldhof Mannheim	85	(0)
2025–	DAC 1904 Dunajská Streda	6	(0)

International career
2013–2014	Germany U15	2	(0)
2014–2015	Germany U16	5	(0)
2015–2016	Germany U17	11	(0)
2017	Germany U18	1	(0)
2017–2018	Germany U19	7	(0)
2018–2019	Germany U20	2	(0)
- * Club domestic league appearances and goals as of 25 May 2026

Jan-Christoph Bartels (born 13 January 1999) is a German professional footballer who plays as a goalkeeper for Slovak club DAC 1904 Dunajská Streda.

== Career ==
Bartels made his professional debut for Wehen Wiesbaden in the 2. Bundesliga on 27 September 2019, starting in the match before being substituted out due to injury in the third minute for Lukas Watkowiak, with the match finishing as a 2–0 home win.

In July 2020, it was announced that Bartels would transfer to 3. Liga club Waldhof Mannheim.

On 4 September 2025, Bartels signed a one-season contract with DAC 1904 Dunajská Streda in Slovakia, with an option to extend.
