= 2022–23 1. FC Köln season =

1. FC Köln
2022–23 season
- President: Werner Wolf
- Chairman: Alexander Wehrle
- Head coach: Steffen Baumgart
- Stadium: RheinEnergieStadion
- Bundesliga: 11th
- DFB-Pokal: First round
- UEFA Europa Conference League: Group stage
- Top goalscorer: League: Ellyes Skhiri (7); All: Dejan Ljubičić; Ellyes Skhiri (8 each)
Home colours	Away colours	Third colours

The 2022–23 season was the 75th season in the history of 1. FC Köln and their fourth consecutive season in the top flight. The club participated in the Bundesliga, the DFB-Pokal and the UEFA Europa Conference League.

== Players ==
As of 29 January 2023

Note: Flags indicate national team as defined under FIFA eligibility rules; some limited exceptions apply. Players may hold more than one non-FIFA nationality.

No.	Pos.	Nation	Player
1	GK	GER	Timo Horn (vice-captain)
2	DF	GER	Benno Schmitz
3	DF	DEN	Kristian Pedersen
4	DF	GER	Timo Hübers
5	DF	CRO	Nikola Soldo
6	MF	GER	Eric Martel
7	MF	AUT	Dejan Ljubičić
8	MF	GER	Denis Huseinbasic
9	FW	SWE	Sebastian Andersson
11	MF	AUT	Florian Kainz
13	FW	GER	Mark Uth
14	MF	GER	Jonas Hector (captain)
15	DF	GER	Luca Kilian
17	MF	GER	Kingsley Schindler

No.	Pos.	Nation	Player
20	GK	GER	Marvin Schwäbe
21	MF	GER	Steffen Tigges
23	MF	ARM	Sargis Adamyan
24	DF	GER	Jeff Chabot (on loan from Sampdoria)
25	FW	GER	Tim Lemperle
27	FW	GER	Davie Selke
28	MF	TUN	Ellyes Skhiri
29	MF	GER	Jan Thielmann
33	FW	GER	Florian Dietz
37	MF	GER	Linton Maina
42	MF	GRE	Dimitrios Limnios
44	GK	GER	Matthias Köbbing
47	MF	LUX	Mathias Olesen
48	DF	GER	Georg Strauch
—	GK	GER	Julian Roloff

=== Players out on loan ===
Note: Flags indicate national team as defined under FIFA eligibility rules; some limited exceptions apply. Players may hold more than one non-FIFA nationality.

No.	Pos.	Nation	Player
—	MF	GER	Jens Castrop (at 1. FC Nürnberg until 30 June 2023)
—	MF	SVK	Ondrej Duda (at Hellas Verona until 30 June 2023)
—	DF	GER	Noah Katterbach (at Hamburger SV until 30 June 2023)
—	MF	GER	Marvin Obuz (at Holstein Kiel until 30 June 2023)
—	GK	GER	Jonas Urbig (at Jahn Regensburg until 30 June 2024)

== Transfers ==
=== In ===
No.	Pos.	Player	Transferred from	Fee	Date	Source
3	DF	Kristian Pedersen (DEN)	Birmingham City (ENG)	Free	1 July 2022	
7	DF	Eric Martel (GER)	RB Leipzig (GER)	Free	1 July 2022	
8	MF	Denis Huseinbasic (GER)	Kickers Offenbach (GER)	€50,000	1 July 2022	
15	DF	Luca Kilian (GER)	Mainz 05 (GER)	€2,000,000	1 July 2022	
21	FW	Steffen Tigges (GER)	Borussia Dortmund (GER)	€1,500,000	1 July 2022	
37	MF	Linton Maina (GER)	Hannover 96 (GER)	Free	1 July 2022	
23	FW	Sargis Adamyan (ARM)	1899 Hoffenheim (GER)	€1,500,000	5 July 2022	
5	DF	Nikola Soldo (CRO)	Locomotiva Zagreb (CRO)	€600,000	1 September 2022	
27	FW	Davie Selke (GER)	Hertha BSC (GER)	Free	2 January 2023	
	GK	Julian Roloff (GER)	Cavalry FC (CAN)	Free	15 January 2023	

=== Out ===
No.	Pos.	Player	Transferred to	Fee	Date	Source
	DF	Yann Aurel Bisseck (GER)	AGF (DEN)	€670,000	1 July 2021	
6	MF	Salih Özcan (GER)	Borussia Dortmund (GER)	€5,000,000	1 July 2021	
21	MF	Louis Schaub (AUT)	Hannover 96 (GER)	Free	1 July 2021	
23	DF	Jannes Horn (GER)	VfL Bochum (GER)	Free	1 July 2021	
30	FW	Marvin Obuz (GER)	Holstein Kiel (GER)	Loan	1 July 2021	
31	MF	Tomáš Ostrák (CZE)	St. Louis City (USA)	Free	1 July 2021	
27	FW	Anthony Modeste (FRA)	Borussia Dortmund (GER)	€5,000,000	8 August 2022	
19	DF	Kingsley Ehizibue (NGA)	Udinese (ITA)	€1,000,000	30 August 2022	
36	MF	Niklas Hauptmann (GER)	Dynamo Dresden (GER)	Undisclosed	31 August 2022	
40	GK	Jonas Urbig (GER)	Jahn Regensburg (GER)	Loan	6 January 2023	
3	DF	Noah Katterbach (GER)	Hamburger SV (GER)	Loan	17 January 2023	
18	MF	Ondrej Duda (SVK)	Hellas Verona (ITA)	Loan	29 January 2023	

== Pre-season and friendlies ==
Win Draw Loss

1 July 2022 Friendly	Mondorf	1–12	1. FC Köln	Troisdorf, Germany
18:00 CEST (UTC+2)	Abdallah 19'	Report	Hübers 16'; Schwirten 25'; Modeste 33'; Dietz 64', 86'; Huseinbasic 66'; Maina 67', 72'; Schmid 70', 87'; Ehizibue 83'; Martel 90'	Stadium: Aggerstadion; Attendance: 2,273; Referee: Sascha Stegemann

8 July 2022 Friendly	1. FC Köln	4–0	Austria Lustenau	Singen, Germany
18:00 CEST (UTC+2)	Dietz 3'; Kainz 16'; Modeste 74'; Lemperle 86'	Report		Stadium: Hohentwielstadion; Referee: Jonas Brombacher (Germany)

9 July 2022 Friendly	1. FC Köln	1–1	Grasshopper	Cologne, Germany
15:00 CEST (UTC+2)	M. Schmid 55'	Report	D. Schmid 32'	Stadium: Bad Dürrheim

16 July 2022 Telekom Cup	1. FC Köln	1–2	Milan	Cologne, Germany
19:00 CEST (UTC+2)	Adamyan (yellow card) 40'; Dietz 86'; Hector (yellow card) 90'	Report	Giroud 16', 36'; Maldini (yellow card) 90'	Stadium: RheinEnergieStadion; Attendance: 48,200; Referee: Sascha Stegemann (Germany)

17 July 2022 Friendly	Kickers Offenbach	0–2	1. FC Köln	Offenbach am Main
15:30 CEST (UTC+2)		Report	Huseinbasic 12'; Adamyan 88'	Stadium: Bieberer Berg; Attendance: 5,606

22 July 2022 Friendly	1. FC Köln	5–0	NEC	Troisdorf, Germany
12:00 CEST (UTC+2)	Duda 22' (pen.); Maina 40'; Adamyan 47'; Lemperle 75', 79'	Report		Stadium: Aggerstadion; Attendance: 0

19 November 2022 Friendly	1. FC Köln	2–4	VfB Stuttgart	Austin, United States
15:00 CST (UTC−6)	Schwirten 68'; Adamyan 84'	Report	Mavropanos 14', 41'; Coulibaly 27', 31'	Stadium: Q2 Stadium; Referee: Samantha Martinez (United States)

21 December 2022 Friendly	1. FC Köln	1–0	SV Meppen	Cologne
13:00 CET (UTC+1)	Adamyan 15'	Report		Stadium: Franz-Kremer-Stadion

7 January 2023 Friendly	1. FC Köln	4–0	Hamburger SV	Cologne
15:30 CET (UTC+1)	Huseinbašić 48', 50'; Diehl 88'; Schindler 120'	Report		Stadium: Franz-Kremer-Stadion; Attendance: 5,700; Referee: Nico Fuchs
Note: Match was played in four 30-minute periods.

23 March 2023 Friendly	1. FC Köln	0–1	Sint-Truiden	Cologne
18:00 CET (UTC+1)		Report	Boya 34'	Stadium: Franz-Kremer-Stadion

== Competitions ==
=== Overall record ===
Competition	First match	Last match	Starting round	Final position	Record							
Competition	First match	Last match	Starting round	Final position	Pld	W	D	L	GF	GA	GD	Win %
Bundesliga	7 August 2022	27 May 2023	Matchday 1	11th	34	10	12	12	49	54	−5	29.41
DFB-Pokal	30 July 2022		First round	First round	1	0	1	0	2	2	+0	0.00
UEFA Europa Conference League	18 August 2022	3 November 2022	Play-off round	Group stage	8	3	2	3	12	10	+2	37.50
Total					43	13	15	15	63	66	−3	30.23

Source: Soccerway

=== Bundesliga ===
==== League table ====
Pos	Team	Pld	W	D	L	GF	GA	GD	Pts
9	Mainz 05	34	12	10	12	54	55	−1	46
10	Borussia Mönchengladbach	34	11	10	13	52	55	−3	43
11	1. FC Köln	34	10	12	12	49	54	−5	42
12	1899 Hoffenheim	34	10	6	18	48	57	−9	36
13	Werder Bremen	34	10	6	18	51	64	−13	36

Source: DFB
Rules for classification: 1) Points; 2) Goal difference; 3) Goals scored; 4) Head-to-head results; 5) Head-to-head away goals scored; 6) Away goals scored; 7) Play-off.

==== Results summary ====
Overall								Home						Away					
Pld	W	D	L	GF	GA	GD	Pts	W	D	L	GF	GA	GD	W	D	L	GF	GA	GD
34	10	12	12	49	54	−5	42	6	6	6	28	20	+8	4	6	6	21	34	−13

Source: DFB

==== Results by round ====
Round	1	2	3	4	5	6	7	8	9	10	11	12	13	14	15	16	17	18	19	20	21	22	23	24	25	26	27	28	29	30	31	32	33	34
Ground	H	A	A	H	A	H	A	H	A	H	A	H	A	H	A	H	A	A	H	H	A	H	A	H	A	H	A	H	A	H	A	H	A	H
Result	W	D	D	D	W	L	D	W	L	W	L	D	L	L	L	W	D	D	D	W	L	L	D	L	L	D	W	D	W	L	W	W	D	L
Position	3	3	8	8	6	7	9	7	9	7	10	10	12	12	13	11	10	12	11	11	12	12	12	12	13	13	12	11	11	11	11	10	10	11

Source: DFB
A = Away; H = Home; W = Win; D = Draw; L = Loss

==== Matches ====
The league fixtures were announced on 17 June 2022.

7 August 2022 1	1. FC Köln	3–1	Schalke 04	Cologne
17:30 CEST (UTC+2)	Kilian 49'; Kainz 62'; Ljubičić 80'	Report	Drexler (red card) 35'; Brunner (yellow card) 51'; Bülter 76'	Stadium: RheinEnergieStadion; Attendance: 50,000; Referee: Robert Schröder

13 August 2022 2	RB Leipzig	2–2	1. FC Köln	Leipzig
15:30 CEST (UTC+2)	Werner 36'; Szoboszlai (red card) 45+1'; Nkunku 56'; Henrichs (yellow card) 89'	Report	Thielmann (yellow card) 18'; Dietz 40'; Hübers (yellow card) 48'; Gvardiol 72' (o.g.); Adamyan (yellow card) 76'; Kainz (yellow card) 79'	Stadium: Red Bull Arena; Attendance: 49,579; Referee: Benjamin Brand

21 August 2022 3	Eintracht Frankfurt	1–1	1. FC Köln	Frankfurt
15:30 CEST (UTC+2)	Kamada 71'	Report	Dietz (yellow card) 58'; Thielmann 82'	Stadium: Waldstadion; Attendance: 50,800; Referee: Martin Petersen

28 August 2022 4	1. FC Köln	0–0	VfB Stuttgart	Cologne
15:30 CEST (UTC+2)	Kilian (yellow card) 58'; Ljubičić (yellow card) 87'	Report	Pfeiffer (red card) 56'; Karazor (yellow card) 79'; Millot (yellow card) 90+5'	Stadium: RheinEnergieStadion; Attendance: 50,000; Referee: Harm Osmers

3 September 2022 5	VfL Wolfsburg	2–4	1. FC Köln	Wolfsburg
15:30 CEST (UTC+2)	L. Nmecha 2', 79'; Van de Ven (yellow card) 38'; Marmoush (yellow card) 82'	Report	Ljubičić 22'; Otávio 31' (o.g.); Kainz 45+2' (pen.); Duda (yellow card) 63'; Adamyan 81'	Stadium: Volkswagen Arena; Attendance: 25,654; Referee: Matthias Jöllenbeck

11 September 2022 6	1. FC Köln	0–1	Union Berlin	Cologne
15:30 CEST (UTC+2)	Kilian (yellow card) 9' (yellow-red card) 81'; Pedersen (yellow card) 54'; Schindler (yellow card) 72'	Report	Hübers 3' (o.g.); Pefok (penalty missed) 10'; Knoche (yellow card) 53'	Stadium: RheinEnergieStadion; Attendance: 49,500; Referee: Benjamin Cortus

18 September 2022 7	VfL Bochum	1–1	1. FC Köln	Bochum
17:30 CEST (UTC+2)	Schmitz 9' (o.g.)	Report	Hübers (yellow card) 68'; Maina 88'	Stadium: Vonovia Ruhrstadion; Attendance: 25,800; Referee: Bastian Dankert

1 October 2022 8	1. FC Köln	3–2	Borussia Dortmund	Cologne
15:30 CEST (UTC+2)	Hübers (yellow card) 21'; Duda (yellow card) 25'; Kainz 53'; Tigges 56'; Ljubičić 71'; Schindler (yellow card) 79'; Huseinbasic (yellow card) 90'	Report	Adeyemi (yellow card) 23'; Guerreiro (yellow card) 29'; Brandt 31'; Süle (yellow card) 36'; Schmitz 78' (o.g.)	Stadium: RheinEnergieStadion; Attendance: 50,000; Referee: Harm Osmers

9 October 2022 9	Borussia Mönchengladbach	5–2	1. FC Köln	Mönchengladbach
15:30 CEST (UTC+2)	Stindl (yellow card) 7', (goal) 46'; Friedrich 27'; Bensebaini (yellow card) 38', (goal) 45+2' (pen.), 76'; Thuram 90+1'	Report	Kainz (yellow card) 11' (yellow-red card) 45+1', (goal) 31' (pen.); Skhiri (yellow card) 63'; Huseinbašić 83'	Stadium: Borussia-Park; Attendance: 54,042; Referee: Sven Jablonski

16 October 2022 10	1. FC Köln	3–2	FC Augsburg	Cologne
15:30 CEST (UTC+2)	Tigges 47', 81'; Huseinbašić 61'; Duda (yellow card) 62'; Uth (yellow card) 90'	Report	Niederlechner 14'; Berisha (yellow card) 22'; Vargas (yellow card) 36'; Iago (yellow card) 54'; Caligiuri 68'; Petkov (yellow card) 79'	Stadium: RheinEnergieStadion; Attendance: 49,000; Referee: Felix Zwayer

21 October 2022 11	Mainz 05	5–0	1. FC Köln	Mainz
20:30 CEST (UTC+2)	Ingvartsen 11' (pen.); Kohr 35', (yellow card) 35'; Stach 40'; Martín 73'; Onisiwo 83'	Report	Kilian (yellow card) 10' (yellow-red card) 28'; Uth (yellow card) 35'; Soldo (yellow card) 50'; Martel (yellow card) 72'	Stadium: Mewa Arena; Attendance: 31,610; Referee: Matthias Jöllenbeck

30 October 2022 12	1. FC Köln	1–1	1899 Hoffenheim	Cologne
19:30 CEST (UTC+2)	Kainz 13'; Duda (yellow card) 51'	Report	Kabak (yellow card) 7' (yellow-red card) 87'; Bruun Larsen 36'	Stadium: RheinEnergieStadion; Attendance: 49,000; Referee: Frank Willenborg

6 November 2022 13	SC Freiburg	2–0	1. FC Köln	Freiburg
17:30 CET (UTC+1)	Jeong 52'; Gregoritsch 64'	Report	Schindler (yellow card) 90'	Stadium: Europa-Park Stadion; Attendance: 33,800; Referee: Florian Badstübner

9 November 2022 14	1. FC Köln	1–2	Bayer Leverkusen	Cologne
18:30 CET (UTC+1)	Schmitz 30'; Thielmann (yellow card) 84'	Report	Amiri 65'; Diaby 71'; Andrich (yellow card) 84'; Demirbay (yellow card) 89'	Stadium: RheinEnergieStadion; Attendance: 50,000; Referee: Tobias Stieler

12 November 2022 15	Hertha BSC	2–0	1. FC Köln	Berlin
15:30 CET (UTC+1)	Kanga 9'; Richter 54'; Kempf (yellow card) 62'; Rogel (yellow card) 62'; Lukebakio (yellow card) 66'	Report	Skhiri (yellow card) 73'	Stadium: Olympiastadion; Attendance: 60,827; Referee: Christian Dingert

21 January 2023 16	1. FC Köln	7–1	Werder Bremen	Cologne
18:30 CET (UTC+1)	Maina 9'; Tigges 15', 21'; Skhiri 30', 54'; Huseinbašić 36'; Friedl 76' (o.g.)	Report	Füllkrug 38'	Stadium: RheinEnergieStadion; Attendance: 50,000; Referee: Robert Schröder

24 January 2023 17	Bayern Munich	1–1	1. FC Köln	Munich
20:30 CET (UTC+1)	Kimmich 90'	Report	Shkiri 4'; Huseinbašić (yellow card) 12'	Stadium: Allianz Arena; Attendance: 75,000; Referee: Tobias Stieler

29 January 2023 18	Schalke 04	0–0	1. FC Köln	Gelsenkirchen
15:30 CET (UTC+1)	Brunner (yellow card) 35'; Terodde (yellow card) 39'; Zalazar (yellow card) 81'	Report	Schmitz (yellow card) 76'; Hübers (yellow card) 81'; Skhiri (yellow card) 86'; Kainz (yellow card) 90+3'	Stadium: Veltins-Arena; Attendance: 61,571; Referee: Matthias Jöllenbeck

4 February 2023 19	1. FC Köln	0–0	RB Leipzig	Cologne
15:30 CET (UTC+1)	Schmitz (yellow card) 41'; Martel (yellow card) 41'; Adamyan (yellow card) 89'	Report	Szoboszlai (yellow card) 31'; Laimer (yellow card) 37'; Gvardiol (yellow card) 45'; Henrichs (yellow card) 73'	Stadium: RheinEnergieStadion; Attendance: 48,000; Referee: Martin Petersen

12 February 2023 20	1. FC Köln	3–0	Eintracht Frankfurt	Cologne
17:30 CET (UTC+1)	Martel (yellow card) 28'; Hübers 49', (yellow card) 68'; Skhiri 71', 86'; Chabot (yellow card) 79'	Report	Buta (yellow card) 45'; Götze (yellow card) 61'	Stadium: RheinEnergieStadion; Attendance: 50,000; Referee: Daniel Siebert

18 February 2023 21	VfB Stuttgart	3–0	1. FC Köln	Stuttgart
15:30 CET (UTC+1)	Dias 9'; Silas (yellow card) 23'; Mavropanos (yellow card) 51'; Sosa 59'; Coulibaly 74'; Millot (yellow card) 82'	Report	Chabot (yellow card) 23'; Schmitz (yellow card) 58'; Skhiri (yellow card) 65'; Adamyan (yellow card) 84'	Stadium: Mercedes-Benz Arena; Attendance: 46,850; Referee: Benjamin Cortus

25 February 2023 22	1. FC Köln	0–2	VfL Wolfsburg	Cologne
15:30 CET (UTC+1)	Hector (yellow card) 66'	Report	Gerhardt 4'; Arnold 68' (pen.); Svanberg (yellow card) 73'; F. Nmecha (yellow card) 90+4'	Stadium: RheinEnergieStadion; Attendance: 49,300; Referee: Frank Willenborg

4 March 2023 23	Union Berlin	0–0	1. FC Köln	Berlin
15:30 CET (UTC+1)	Pefok (yellow card) 90+2'	Report		Stadium: Stadion An der Alten Försterei; Attendance: 22,012; Referee: Tobias Stieler

10 March 2023 24	1. FC Köln	0–2	VfL Bochum	Cologne
20:30 CET (UTC+1)	Hector (yellow card) 66'; Schmitz (yellow card) 82'	Report	Stöger 9' (pen.); Hofmann (yellow card) 29'; Asano (yellow card) 49'; Mašović 76'	Stadium: RheinEnergieStadion; Attendance: 50,000; Referee: Tobias Welz

18 March 2023 25	Borussia Dortmund	6–1	1. FC Köln	Dortmund
18:30 CET (UTC+1)	Guerreiro 15'; Haller 17', 69'; Reus 32', 70'; Malen 36'; Dahoud (yellow card) 66'	Report	Selke 42'	Stadium: Signal Iduna Park; Attendance: 81,365; Referee: Daniel Siebert

2 April 2023 26	1. FC Köln	0–0	Borussia Mönchengladbach	Cologne
15:30 CEST (UTC+2)	Schmitz (yellow card) 33'; Kainz (yellow card) 73'; Huseinbašić (yellow card) 82'; Tigges (yellow card) 90+3'	Report	Koné (yellow card) 21'; Scally (yellow card) 35'; Bensebaini (yellow card) 59'	Stadium: RheinEnergieStadion; Attendance: 50,000; Referee: Felix Zwayer

8 April 2023 27	FC Augsburg	1–3	1. FC Köln	Augsburg
15:30 CEST (UTC+2)	Vargas (yellow card) 6', (goal) 29'; Iago (yellow card) 45'; Engels (yellow card) 56'	Report	Skhiri 7', (yellow card) 84'; Martel 16', (yellow card) 25'; Schindler (yellow card) 27'; Maina 59'; Hübers (yellow card) 72'	Stadium: WWK Arena; Attendance: 30,660; Referee: Robert Schröder

15 April 2023 28	1. FC Köln	1–1	Mainz 05	Cologne
15:30 CEST (UTC+2)	Kainz (yellow card) 8'; Ljubičić 51'; Hübers (yellow card) 86'; Thielmann (yellow card) 90+2'	Report	Ajorque 17', (yellow card) 34'; Kohr (yellow card) 90+2'	Stadium: RheinEnergieStadion; Attendance: 50,000; Referee: Benjamin Cortus

22 April 2023 29	1899 Hoffenheim	1–3	1. FC Köln	Sinsheim
15:30 CEST (UTC+2)	Brooks (yellow card) 29'; Dolberg 90+4'	Report	Kainz 18' (pen.); Selke (yellow card) 26', (goal) 39'; Schwäbe (yellow card) 29'; Thielmann 90+2'	Stadium: PreZero Arena; Attendance: 30,150; Referee: Robin Braun

29 April 2023 30	1. FC Köln	0–1	SC Freiburg	Cologne
15:30 CEST (UTC+2)	Martel (yellow card) 24'	Report	Dōan 54'; Höfler (yellow card) 61'	Stadium: RheinEnergieStadion; Attendance: 55,000; Referee: Tobias Reichel

5 May 2023 31	Bayer Leverkusen	1–2	1. FC Köln	Leverkusen
20:30 CEST (UTC+2)	Adli 28', (yellow card) 80'	Report	Selke 14', 36', (yellow card) 71'; Thielmann (yellow card) 45'; Olesen (yellow card) 69'; Chabot (yellow card) 80'; Maina (yellow card) 80'; Schmitz (yellow card) 83'	Stadium: BayArena; Attendance: 30,210; Referee: Felix Zwayer

12 May 2023 32	1. FC Köln	5–2	Hertha BSC	Cologne
20:30 CEST (UTC+2)	Selke 8'; Martel (yellow card) 24'; Hübers 39', 69', (yellow card) 72'; Skhiri 43'; Huseinbašić 81'	Report	Tousart 18'; Jovetić 33'; Lukebakio (yellow card) 37'; Dárdai (yellow card) 45+5'; Mittelstädt (yellow card) 73'; Rogel (yellow card) 78'; Serdar (yellow card) 90+1'; Ngankam (yellow card) 90+1'; Richter (yellow card) 90+2'	Stadium: RheinEnergieStadion; Attendance: 50,000; Referee: Sven Jablonski

20 May 2023 33	Werder Bremen	1–1	1. FC Köln	Bremen
15:30 CEST (UTC+2)	Weiser (yellow card) 27'; Bittencourt (yellow card) 33'; Schmid 73'; Stage (yellow card) 79'; Buchanan (yellow card) 82'	Report	Ljubičić (yellow card) 12'; Tigges 36'; Hector (yellow card) 89'	Stadium: Wohninvest Weserstadion; Attendance: 41,846; Referee: Robert Hartmann

27 May 2023 34	1. FC Köln	1–2	Bayern Munich	Cologne
15:30 CEST (UTC+2)	Schmitz (yellow card) 24'; Ljubičić 81' (pen.), (yellow card) 82'; Thielmann (yellow card) 90'	Report	Coman 8'; Musiala 89'	Stadium: RheinEnergieStadion; Attendance: 50,000; Referee: Sven Jablonski

=== DFB-Pokal ===
30 July 2022 First round	Jahn Regensburg	2–2 (a.e.t.) (4–3 p)	1. FC Köln	Regensburg
15:30	Albers 18'; Owusu 27'; Gimber (yellow card) 72'; Breitkreuz (yellow card) 83'; Saller (yellow card) 90'; Makridis (yellow card) 107'	Report	Uth 28', (yellow card) 66'; Ljubičić 63'; Hübers (yellow card) 73'	Stadium: Jahnstadion Regensburg; Attendance: 13,236; Referee: Felix Brych
	Penalties
	Makridis (penalty scored); Thalhammer (penalty scored); Saller (penalty missed); Yıldırım (penalty scored); Gimber (penalty scored)		(penalty scored) Ljubičić; (penalty missed) Chabot; (penalty scored) Maina; (penalty scored) Thielmann; (penalty missed) Ehizibue

=== UEFA Europa Conference League ===
==== Play-off round ====
The draw for the play-off round was held on 2 August 2022.

18 August 2022 First leg	1. FC Köln (Germany)	1–2	(Hungary) Fehérvár	Cologne
20:30 CEST (UTC+2)	Dietz 14'; Chabot (red card) 20'; Skhiri (yellow card) 68'; Hector (yellow card) 90+5'	Report	Larsen (yellow card) 24'; Zivzivadze 32', (yellow card) 85'; Dárdai 40', (yellow card) 69'; Hangya (yellow card) 55'; Fiola (yellow card) 58'	Stadium: RheinEnergieStadion; Attendance: 44,000; Referee: Tiago Martins (Portugal)

25 August 2022 Second leg	Fehérvár (Hungary)	0–3 (2–4 agg.)	(Germany) 1. FC Köln	Székesfehérvár, Hungary
19:00 CEST (UTC+2)	Zivzivadze (yellow card) 66'; Heister (yellow card) 68'; Lyednyev (yellow card) 89'	Report	Hübers 10'; Ljubičić (yellow card) 45+1'; Skhiri 46'; Kilian (yellow card) 60'; Hector (yellow card) 89'; Schindler 90+4', (yellow card) 90+4'	Stadium: MOL Aréna Sóstó; Attendance: 10,411; Referee: Ali Palabıyık (Turkey)

==== Group stage ====
The draw for the group stage was held on 26 August 2022.

Pos	Team	Pld	W	D	L	GF	GA	GD	Pts	Qualification	NCE	PRT	KLN	SVK
1	(France) Nice	6	2	3	1	8	7	+1	9 (Note: Head-to-head points: Nice 4, Partizan 1.)	Advance to round of 16	—	2–1	1–1	1–2
2	(Serbia) Partizan	6	2	3	1	9	7	+2	9	Advance to knockout round play-offs	1–1	—	2–0	1–1
3	(Germany) 1. FC Köln	6	2	2	2	8	8	0	8		2–2	0–1	—	4–2
4	(Czech Republic) Slovácko	6	1	2	3	8	11	−3	5		0–1	3–3	0–1	—

Source: UEFA
Rules for classification: Group stage tiebreakers
Notes:

8 September 2022 1	Nice (France)	1–1	(Germany) 1. FC Köln	Nice, France
18:45 CEST (UTC+2)	Boudaoui (yellow card) 39'; Delort 62' (pen.)	Report	Tigges 19'; Hector (yellow card) 59'; Hübers (yellow card) 61'	Stadium: Allianz Riviera; Attendance: 19,000; Referee: Luís Godinho (Portugal)

15 September 2022 2	1. FC Köln (Germany)	4–2	(Czech Republic) Slovácko	Cologne
21:00 CEST (UTC+2)	Duda (yellow card) 2'; Adamyan 10'; Martel (yellow card) 36'; Dietz 42'; Maina (yellow card) 50'; Ljubičić 65' (pen.), 74'	Report	Kalabiška 49'; Petržela 52'; Trávník (yellow card) 56'	Stadium: RheinEnergieStadion; Attendance: 47,700; Referee: Yevhen Aranovskyi (Ukraine)

6 October 2022 3	1. FC Köln (Germany)	0–1	(Serbia) Partizan	Cologne
21:00 CEST (UTC+2)		Report	Marković 9'; Natcho (yellow card) 90'	Stadium: RheinEnergieStadion; Attendance: 47,000; Referee: Ricardo de Burgos Bengoetxea (Spain)

13 October 2022 4	Partizan (Serbia)	2–0	(Germany) 1. FC Köln	Belgrade, Serbia
18:45 CEST (UTC+2)	Diabaté 15', (yellow card) 45+3'; Gomes 52'; Belić (yellow card) 58'; Marković (yellow card) 68'; Fejsa (yellow card) 74'; Urošević (yellow card) 90+4'	Report	Hübers (yellow card) 48'; Hector (yellow card) 55'; Skhiri (yellow card) 90+4'	Stadium: Partizan Stadium; Attendance: 15,467; Referee: Roi Reinshreiber (Israel)

28 October 2022 5	Slovácko (Czech Republic)	0–1	(Germany) 1. FC Köln	Uherské Hradiště, Czech Republic
13:00 CEST (UTC+2)	Trávník (yellow card) 53'; Kohút (yellow card) 81'; Daníček (yellow card) 90+3'; Hofmann (yellow card) 90+3'	Report	Kainz (penalty missed) 51'; Adamyan (yellow card) 54'; Huseinbašić (yellow card) 77'; Duda 82' (pen.), (yellow card) 90+3'; Schindler (yellow card) 83'; Kilian (yellow card) 90+5'	Stadium: Městský fotbalový stadion Miroslava Valenty; Attendance: 7,333; Referee: Giorgi Kruashvili (Georgia)
Note: The match was originally played on 27 October 2022 at 18:45 CEST, but was suspended after six minutes due to adverse weather conditions with the score 0–0 at the time. It was resumed on the following day.

3 November 2022 6	1. FC Köln (Germany)	2–2	(France) Nice	Cologne
21:00 CET (UTC+1)	Huseinbašić 48'; Hübers (yellow card) 55'; Duda 60'; Maina (yellow card) 69'	Report	Laborde 40'; Brahimi 43'	Stadium: RheinEnergieStadion; Attendance: 47,000; Referee: César Soto Grado (Spain)

== Statistics ==
=== Appearances and goals ===
No.	Pos	Nat	Player	Total		Bundesliga		DFB-Pokal		Europa Conference League	
No.	Pos	Nat	Player	Apps	Goals	Apps	Goals	Apps	Goals	Apps	Goals
Goalkeepers
1	GK	(Germany) GER	Timo Horn	1	0	0	0	1	0	0	0
20	GK	(Germany) GER	Marvin Schwäbe	32	0	24	0	0	0	8	0
44	GK	(Germany) GER	Matthias Köbbing	0	0	0	0	0	0	0	0
Defenders
2	DF	(Germany) GER	Benno Schmitz	27	1	21+1	1	1	0	3+1	0
3	DF	(Denmark) DEN	Kristian Pedersen	13	0	3+2	0	1	0	7	0
4	DF	(Germany) GER	Timo Hübers	27	2	18+1	1	1	0	6+1	1
5	DF	(Croatia) CRO	Nikola Soldo	11	0	6+1	0	0	0	4	0
15	DF	(Germany) GER	Luca Kilian	19	1	13	1	0	0	5+1	0
24	DF	(Germany) GER	Jeff Chabot	13	0	11	0	1	0	1	0
48	DF	(Germany) GER	Greg Strauch	0	0	0	0	0	0	0	0
Midfielders
6	MF	(Germany) GER	Eric Martel	26	0	15+5	0	0	0	5+1	0
7	MF	(Austria) AUT	Dejan Ljubicic	23	6	12+5	3	1	1	4+1	2
8	MF	(Germany) GER	Denis Huseinbasic	20	4	7+8	3	0	0	3+2	1
11	MF	(Austria) AUT	Florian Kainz	30	5	21+1	5	1	0	7	0
14	MF	(Germany) GER	Jonas Hector	29	0	22	0	0+1	0	3+3	0
17	MF	(Germany) GER	Kingsley Schindler	25	1	4+15	0	0	0	5+1	1
21	MF	(Germany) GER	Steffen Tigges	28	6	16+5	5	0	0	2+5	1
23	MF	(Armenia) ARM	Sargis Adamyan	29	2	3+18	1	1	0	5+2	1
28	MF	(Tunisia) TUN	Ellyes Skhiri	31	6	23	5	1	0	6+1	1
29	MF	(Germany) GER	Jan Thielmann	20	1	5+9	1	0+1	0	2+3	0
37	MF	(Germany) GER	Linton Maina	32	2	18+5	2	0+1	0	2+6	0
42	MF	(Greece) GRE	Dimitrios Limnios	0	0	0	0	0	0	0	0
47	MF	(Luxembourg) LUX	Mathias Olesen	13	0	5+6	0	0	0	0+2	0
Forwards
9	FW	(Sweden) SWE	Sebastian Andersson	0	0	0	0	0	0	0	0
13	FW	(Germany) GER	Mark Uth	5	1	0+3	0	1	1	0+1	0
25	FW	(Germany) GER	Tim Lemperle	12	0	0+10	0	0+1	0	0+1	0
27	FW	(Germany) GER	Davie Selke	7	0	3+4	0	0	0	0	0
33	FW	(Germany) GER	Florian Dietz	18	3	4+7	1	0	0	6+1	2
43	FW	(Germany) GER	Maximilian Schmid	1	0	0	0	0	0	0+1	0
49	FW	(Germany) GER	Justin Diehl	2	0	0+2	0	0	0	0	0
Players transferred out during the season
5	DF	(Germany) GER	Bright Arrey-Mbi	0	0	0	0	0	0	0	0
18	MF	(Slovakia) SVK	Ondrej Duda	18	2	9+4	0	0	0	4+1	2
19	DF	(Nigeria) NGR	Kingsley Ehizibue	3	0	1	0	0+1	0	0+1	0
27	FW	(France) FRA	Anthony Modeste	1	0	0	0	1	0	0	0
36	MF	(Germany) GER	Niklas Hauptmann	0	0	0	0	0	0	0	0
40	GK	(Germany) GER	Jonas Urbig	0	0	0	0	0	0	0	0

Last updated: 10 March 2023
Source: Competitions

=== Goalscorers ===
Rank	Pos.	No.	Nat.	Player	Bundesliga	DFB-Pokal	Europa Conference League	Total
1	MF	7	(Austria)	Dejan Ljubicic	3	1	2	6
1	MF	21	(Germany)	Steffen Tigges	5	0	1	6
1	MF	28	(Tunisia)	Ellyes Skhiri	5	0	1	6
4	MF	11	(Austria)	Florian Kainz	5	0	0	5
5	MF	8	(Germany)	Denis Huseinbasic	3	0	1	4
6	FW	33	(Germany)	Florian Dietz	1	0	2	3
7	DF	4	(Germany)	Timo Hübers	1	0	1	2
7	MF	18	(Slovakia)	Ondrej Duda	0	0	2	2
7	MF	23	(Armenia)	Sargis Adamyan	1	0	1	2
7	MF	37	(Germany)	Linton Maina	2	0	0	2
11	DF	2	(Germany)	Benno Schmitz	1	0	0	1
11	FW	13	(Germany)	Mark Uth	0	1	0	1
11	DF	15	(Germany)	Luca Kilian	1	0	0	1
11	MF	17	(Germany)	Kingsley Schindler	0	0	1	1
11	MF	29	(Germany)	Jan Thielmann	1	0	0	1
Own goals					3	0	0	3
Totals					32	2	12	46

Last updated: 12 February 2023
