= 2021–22 1. FC Köln season =

1. FC Köln
2021–22 season
- President: Werner Wolf
- Chairman: Alexander Wehrle
- Manager: Steffen Baumgart
- Stadium: RheinEnergieStadion
- Bundesliga: 7th
- DFB-Pokal: Round of 16
- Top goalscorer: League: Anthony Modeste (20); All: Anthony Modeste (23)
Home colours	Away colours	Third colours

The 2021–22 season was the 74th season in the existence of 1. FC Köln and the club's third consecutive season in the top flight of German football. In addition to the domestic league, 1. FC Köln participated in this season's edition of the DFB-Pokal.

== Players ==
=== First-team squad ===
As of 31 January 2022.

Note: Flags indicate national team as defined under FIFA eligibility rules; some limited exceptions apply. Players may hold more than one non-FIFA nationality.

No.	Pos.	Nation	Player
1	GK	GER	Timo Horn (vice-captain)
2	DF	GER	Benno Schmitz
4	DF	GER	Timo Hübers
5	DF	GER	Bright Arrey-Mbi (on loan from Bayern Munich)
6	MF	GER	Salih Özcan
7	MF	AUT	Dejan Ljubicic
9	FW	SWE	Sebastian Andersson
11	MF	AUT	Florian Kainz
13	FW	GER	Mark Uth
14	DF	GER	Jonas Hector (captain)
15	DF	GER	Luca Kilian (on loan from Mainz 05)
17	MF	GHA	Kingsley Schindler
18	MF	SVK	Ondrej Duda
19	DF	NGR	Kingsley Ehizibue

No.	Pos.	Nation	Player
20	GK	GER	Marvin Schwäbe
21	MF	AUT	Louis Schaub
23	DF	GER	Jannes Horn (3rd captain)
24	DF	GER	Jeff Chabot (on loan from Sampdoria)
25	MF	GER	Tim Lemperle
27	FW	FRA	Anthony Modeste
28	MF	TUN	Ellyes Skhiri
29	MF	GER	Jan Thielmann
30	FW	GER	Marvin Obuz
31	MF	CZE	Tomáš Ostrák
36	MF	GER	Niklas Hauptmann
40	GK	GER	Jonas Urbig
44	GK	GER	Matthias Köbbing
47	MF	LUX	Mathias Olesen

=== Players out on loan ===
Note: Flags indicate national team as defined under FIFA eligibility rules; some limited exceptions apply. Players may hold more than one non-FIFA nationality.

No.	Pos.	Nation	Player
—	DF	GER	Yann Aurel Bisseck (at Aarhus GF until 30 June 2022)
—	MF	GER	Jens Castrop (at 1. FC Nürnberg until 30 June 2022)
—	DF	GER	Noah Katterbach (at Basel until 31 December 2022)
—	MF	GRE	Dimitrios Limnios (at Twente until 30 June 2022)

== Transfers ==
=== In ===
No.	Pos	Player	Transferred from	Fee'	Date	Source
4	DF	(Germany) Timo Hübers	(Germany) Hannover 96	Free	1 July 2021	
7	MF	(Austria) Dejan Ljubicic	(Austria) Rapid Wien	Free	1 July 2021	
13	FW	(Germany) Mark Uth	(Germany) Schalke 04	Free	1 July 2021	
20	GK	(Germany) Marvin Schwäbe	(Denmark) Brøndby	Free	1 July 2021	
15	DF	(Germany) Luca Kilian	(Germany) Mainz 05	Loan	24 August 2021	
24	DF	(Germany) Jeff Chabot	(Italy) Sampdoria	Loan	26 January 2022	
5	DF	(Germany) Bright Arrey-Mbi	(Germany) Bayern Munich	Loan	31 January 2022	

=== Out ===
No.	Pos	Player	Transferred to	Fee	Date	Source
	DF	(Germany) Yann Aurel Bisseck	(Denmark) AGF	Loan	1 July 2021	
4	DF	(Germany) Robert Voloder	(Slovenia) NK Maribor	Loan	1 July 2021	
6	MF	(Germany) Marco Höger		Free	1 July 2021	
8	MF	(Belgium) Birger Verstraete	(Belgium) Antwerp	€2,000,000	1 July 2021	
13	MF	(Germany) Max Meyer		Free	1 July 2021	
32	GK	(Germany) Julian Krahl	(Germany) Viktoria Berlin	Free	1 July 2021	
3	DF	(Germany) Lasse Sobiech	(Germany) SV Darmstadt 98	Free	3 July 2021	
7	MF	(Germany) Marcel Risse	(Germany) Viktoria Köln	Undisclosed	8 July 2021	
8	DF	(Germany) Ismail Jakobs	AS Monaco	€7,000,000	12 July 2021	
33	DF	(Belgium) Sebastiaan Bornauw	(Germany) VfL Wolfsburg	€13,500,000	16 July 2021	
24	MF	(Germany) Dominick Drexler	(Germany) Schalke 04	Free	21 July 2021	
15	MF	(Greece) Dimitrios Limnios	(Netherlands) Twente	Loan	6 August 2021	
	MF	(France) Vincent Koziello	(Belgium) K.V. Oostende	Free	17 August 2021	
4	DF	(Germany) Robert Voloder	(Slovenia) NK Maribor	Undisclosed	1 January 2022	
5	DF	(Germany) Rafael Czichos	(United States) Chicago Fire	€455,000	2 January 2022	
	MF	(Germany) Jens Castrop	(Germany) 1. FC Nürnberg	Loan	7 January 2022	
26	DF	(Serbia) Sava-Arangel Čestić		Mutual contract termination	7 January 2022	
3	DF	(Germany) Noah Katterbach	(Switzerland) Basel	Loan	18 January 2022	
22	DF	(Spain) Jorge Meré	(Mexico) Club América	€900,000	18 January 2022	

== Pre-season and friendlies ==
Win Draw Loss

9 July 2021 Friendly	Fortuna Köln	0–4	1. FC Köln	Cologne, Germany
18:00 CEST (UTC+2)		Report	Thielmann 37'; Uth 54'; Lemperle 70'; Drexler 84'	Stadium: Südstadion; Attendance: 0 Referee: Christian Scheper

10 July 2021 Friendly	MSV Duisburg	1–1	1. FC Köln	Duisburg, Germany
17:00 CEST (UTC+2)	Stoppelkamp 90'	Report	Modeste 63'	Stadium: BZA Westender Straße; Attendance: 0

17 July 2021 Friendly	1. FC Köln	3–2	Bayern Munich	Villingen-Schwenningen, Germany
16:00 CEST (UTC+2)	Thielmann 20'; Uth 27', 56'; Schmitz (yellow card) 80'	Report	Sieb 6'; Zirkzee 34'; Sarr (yellow card) 53'	Stadium: MS Technologie Arena; Referee: Daniel Schlager

18 July 2021 Friendly	1. FC Köln	2–0	Schaffhausen	Bad Dürrheim, Germany
17:00 CEST (UTC+2)	Andersson 33'; Wydra 67'	Report		Stadium: Sportplatz Bad Dürrheim; Referee: Martin Petersen

24 July 2021 Friendly	1. FC Köln	2–1	SV Elversberg	Bad Dürrheim, Germany
17:00 CEST (UTC+2)	Ehizibue 28'; Modeste 42'	Report	Karger 14'	Stadium: Sportplatz Bad Dürrheim; Referee: Timo Lämmle

31 July 2021 Friendly	1. FC Köln	1–1	Roda JC Kerkrade	Cologne, Germany
15:30 CEST (UTC+2)	Lemperle 86'	Report	Jubitana 37'; Jensen (yellow card) 55'	Stadium: Franz-Kremer-Stadion; Referee: Marc Jäger

1 August 2021 Friendly	Almere City	Cancelled	1. FC Köln	Almere, Netherlands
15:30 CEST (UTC+2)				Stadium: Yanmar Stadion

10 November 2021 Friendly	1. FC Köln	4–0	SC Paderborn	Cologne, Germany
13:00 CET (UTC+1)	Schindler 23'; Modeste 34'; Wydra 65'; Kainz 84'			Stadium: Franz-Kremer-Stadion

27 January 2022 Friendly	1. FC Köln	2–2	Schalke 04	Cologne, Germany
13:00 CET (UTC+1)	Modeste 28'; Andersson 47'	Report	Bülter 10'; Pieringer 73'	Stadium: Franz-Kremer Stadion; Attendance: 0 Referee: Mitja Stegemann

23 March 2022 Friendly	Siegburger SV	1–8	1. FC Köln	Siegburg, Germany
18:00 CET (UTC+1)	Barini 66'	Report	Uth 10', 45'; Downs 12', 24', 42'; Kilian 18'; Hector 70'; Suchanek 82'	Stadium: Walter-Mundorf-Stadion; Referee: Mitja Stegemann

== Competitions ==
=== Overall record ===
Competition	First match	Last match	Starting round	Final position	Record							
Competition	First match	Last match	Starting round	Final position	Pld	W	D	L	GF	GA	GD	Win %
Bundesliga	15 August 2021	14 May 2022	Matchday 1	7th	34	14	10	10	52	49	+3	41.18
DFB-Pokal	8 August 2021	18 January 2022	First round	Round of 16	3	1	2	0	4	2	+2	33.33
Total					37	15	12	10	56	51	+5	40.54

Source: Soccerway

=== Bundesliga ===
==== League table ====
Pos	Team	Pld	W	D	L	GF	GA	GD	Pts	Qualification or relegation
5	Union Berlin	34	16	9	9	50	44	+6	57	Qualification for the Europa League group stage (Note: Since the 2021–22 DFB-Pokal winners, RB Leipzig, qualified for the Champions League based on league position, the Europa League group stage spot was passed to the sixth-placed team, and the Europa Conference League play-off round spot was passed to the seventh-placed team.)
6	SC Freiburg	34	15	10	9	58	46	+12	55	Qualification for the Europa League group stage
7	1. FC Köln	34	14	10	10	52	49	+3	52	Qualification for the Europa Conference League play-off round
8	Mainz 05	34	13	7	14	50	45	+5	46	
9	1899 Hoffenheim	34	13	7	14	58	60	−2	46	

Source: DFB
Rules for classification: 1) Points; 2) Goal difference; 3) Goals scored; 4) Head-to-head results; 5) Head-to-head away goals scored; 6) Away goals scored; 7) Play-off.

==== Results summary ====
Overall								Home						Away					
Pld	W	D	L	GF	GA	GD	Pts	W	D	L	GF	GA	GD	W	D	L	GF	GA	GD
34	14	10	10	53	49	+4	52	9	4	4	28	21	+7	5	6	6	25	28	−3

Source: DFB

==== Results by round ====
Round	1	2	3	4	5	6	7	8	9	10	11	12	13	14	15	16	17	18	19	20	21	22	23	24	25	26	27	28	29	30	31	32	33	34
Ground	H	A	H	A	H	A	H	A	H	A	H	A	H	A	H	A	H	A	H	A	H	A	H	A	H	A	H	A	H	A	H	A	H	A
Result	W	L	W	D	D	D	W	L	D	L	D	D	W	D	L	W	W	W	L	D	W	L	W	D	L	W	D	L	W	W	W	W	L	L
Position	4	8	6	7	7	7	6	7	8	11	11	12	10	9	12	10	8	6	9	8	6	8	7	8	8	7	7	8	8	7	7	6	7	7

Source: DFB
A = Away; H = Home; W = Win; D = Draw; L = Loss

==== Matches ====
The league fixtures were announced on 25 June 2021.

15 August 2021 1	1. FC Köln	3–1	Hertha BSC	Cologne
17:30 CEST (UTC+2)	Hübers (yellow card) 16'; Modeste 41'; Kainz 52', 55'; Czichos (yellow card) 67'; Thielmann (yellow card) 77'; Skhiri (yellow card) 80'	Report	Jovetić 5'; Plattenhardt (yellow card) 90'; Serdar (yellow card) 90+4'	Stadium: RheinEnergieStadion; Attendance: 16,500; Referee: Robert Hartmann

22 August 2021 2	Bayern Munich	3–2	1. FC Köln	Munich
17:30 CEST (UTC+2)	Lewandowski 50'; Gnabry 59', 71'; Süle (yellow card) 75'	Report	Ljubicic (yellow card) 20'; Modeste 60'; Uth 62'	Stadium: Allianz Arena; Attendance: 20,000; Referee: Martin Petersen

28 August 2021 3	1. FC Köln	2–1	VfL Bochum	Cologne
15:30 CEST (UTC+2)	Schaub 82'; Lemperle 90+1'	Report	Zoller (yellow card) 55', (goal) 90+4'	Stadium: RheinEnergieStadion; Attendance: 25,000; Referee: Benjamin Cortus

11 September 2021 4	SC Freiburg	1–1	1. FC Köln	Freiburg
15:30 CEST (UTC+2)	Schade (yellow card) 74'; Czichos 89' (o.g.)	Report	Modeste 34', (yellow card) 69'; Kainz (yellow card) 51' (yellow-red card) 74'	Stadium: SC-Stadion; Attendance: 10,000; Referee: Harm Osmers

18 September 2021 5	1. FC Köln	1–1	RB Leipzig	Cologne
18:30 CEST (UTC+2)	Czichos (yellow card) 17'; Modeste 53'; Meré (yellow card) 76'; Schmitz (yellow card) 79'	Report	Haidara 71'; Klostermann (yellow card) 76'	Stadium: RheinEnergieStadion; Attendance: 25,000; Referee: Felix Brych

25 September 2021 6	Eintracht Frankfurt	1–1	1. FC Köln	Frankfurt
15:30 CEST (UTC+2)	Chandler (yellow card) 25'; Borré 45+7'; Hinteregger (yellow card) 80'	Report	Skhiri 14'; Ljubicic (yellow card) 37'; Ehizibue (yellow card) 77'; Andersson (yellow card) 86'	Stadium: Deutsche Bank Park; Attendance: 24,000; Referee: Martin Petersen

1 October 2021 7	1. FC Köln	3–1	Greuther Fürth	Cologne
20:30 CEST (UTC+2)	Andersson 50', (yellow card) 68'; Skhiri 55', 89'	Report	Meyerhöfer 7'; Griesbeck (yellow card) 24'	Stadium: RheinEnergieStadion; Attendance: 40,000; Referee: Matthias Jöllenbeck

15 October 2021 8	1899 Hoffenheim	5–0	1. FC Köln	Sinsheim
20:30 CEST (UTC+2)	Bebou 31', 49'; Kadeřábek (yellow card) 33'; Baumgartner 51'; Geiger 74'; Posch 87'	Report	Czichos (yellow card) 81'	Stadium: Rhein-Neckar-Arena; Attendance: 14,309; Referee: Tobias Reichel

24 October 2021 9	1. FC Köln	2–2	Bayer Leverkusen	Cologne
15:30 CEST (UTC+2)	Uth (yellow card) 36'; Modeste 63', 82'	Report	Schick 15'; Bellarabi 17'; Demirbay (yellow card) 43'; Diaby (yellow card) 65'; Andrich (yellow card) 89'	Stadium: RheinEnergieStadion; Attendance: 49,600; Referee: Felix Zwayer

30 October 2021 10	Borussia Dortmund	2–0	1. FC Köln	Dortmund
15:30 CEST (UTC+2)	Hazard 40'; Meunier (yellow card) 52'; Tigges 64'; Bellingham (yellow card) 88'	Report	Schmitz (yellow card) 11'; Hübers (yellow card) 56'; Özcan (yellow card) 82'	Stadium: Signal Iduna Park; Attendance: 66,709; Referee: Martin Petersen

7 November 2021 11	1. FC Köln	2–2	Union Berlin	Cologne
17:30 CET (UTC+1)	Modeste 7', 86', (yellow card) 17'; Duda (yellow card) 54'	Report	Ryerson 9'; Baumgartl (yellow card) 16'; Luthe (yellow card) 18'; Prömel 45+1'	Stadium: RheinEnergieStadion; Attendance: 49,000; Referee: Daniel Siebert

21 November 2021 12	Mainz 05	1–1	1. FC Köln	Mainz
17:30 CET (UTC+1)	Burkardt 41'; Bell (yellow card) 42'; Szalai (yellow card) 90+1'	Report	Özcan 47'; Duda (yellow card) 54'	Stadium: Opel Arena; Attendance: 25,500; Referee: Deniz Aytekin

27 November 2021 13	1. FC Köln	4–1	Borussia Mönchengladbach	Cologne
15:30 CET (UTC+1)	Ljubicic 55'; Duda (yellow card) 60', (goal) 78'; Uth 77'; Andersson 90+3'	Report	Sommer (yellow card) 60'; Zakaria (yellow card) 64'; Hofmann 74'; Thuram (yellow card) 90'	Stadium: RheinEnergieStadion; Attendance: 50,000; Referee: Robert Schröder

4 December 2021 14	Arminia Bielefeld	1–1	1. FC Köln	Bielefeld
15:30 CET (UTC+1)	Kunze (yellow card) 20'; Lasme 60'	Report	Özcan 17'; Schindler (yellow card) 31'	Stadium: Bielefelder Alm; Attendance: 8,231; Referee: Felix Brych

10 December 2021 15	1. FC Köln	0–2	FC Augsburg	Cologne
20:30 CET (UTC+1)	Kilian (yellow card) 57'; Özcan (yellow card) 87'	Report	Gregoritsch (yellow card) 25'; Dorsch (yellow card) 41', (goal) 88'; Gouweleeuw (yellow card) 57'; Hahn 72'; Córdova (yellow card) 86'	Stadium: RheinEnergieStadion; Referee: Patrick Ittrich

14 December 2021 16	VfL Wolfsburg	2–3	1. FC Köln	Wolfsburg
20:30 CET (UTC+1)	L. Nmecha 8', (yellow card) 14'; Weghorst 51'; Roussillon (yellow card) 80'; Arnold (yellow card) 81'	Report	Modeste 34', 89'; Schmitz (yellow card) 61'; Uth 73'; Czichos (yellow card) 87'	Stadium: Volkswagen Arena; Attendance: 5,000; Referee: Robert Hartmann

19 December 2021 17	1. FC Köln	1–0	VfB Stuttgart	Cologne
17:30 CET (UTC+1)	Kainz (yellow card) 69'; Hector (yellow card) 86'; Modeste 88'; Thielmann (yellow card) 90+3'	Report	Marmoush (yellow card) 21'	Stadium: RheinEnergieStadion; Attendance: 15,000; Referee: Bastian Dankert

9 January 2022 18	Hertha BSC	1–3	1. FC Köln	Berlin
15:30 CET (UTC+1)	Torunarigha (yellow card) 48'; Darida 57'; Serdar (yellow card) 61'; Boateng (yellow card) 82'	Report	Hübers (yellow card) 15'; Modeste 29'; Duda 32'; Thielmann 90+1'	Stadium: Olympiastadion; Attendance: 3,000; Referee: Tobias Stieler

15 January 2022 19	1. FC Köln	0–4	Bayern Munich	Cologne
15:30 CET (UTC+1)	Kilian (yellow card) 9'	Report	Lewandowski 9', 63', 74'; Tolisso 25'	Stadium: RheinEnergieStadion; Attendance: 1,000; Referee: Tobias Welz

22 January 2022 20	VfL Bochum	2–2	1. FC Köln	Bochum
18:30 CET (UTC+1)	Holtmann 25'; Asano 70'	Report	Hübers 36'; Modeste 45'; Hector (yellow card) 60'; Horn (yellow card) 85'; Uth (yellow card) 90+2'	Stadium: Vonovia Ruhrstadion; Attendance: 0 Referee: Matthias Jöllenbeck

5 February 2022 21	1. FC Köln	1–0	SC Freiburg	Cologne
15:30 CET (UTC+1)	Modeste 23'; Thielmann (yellow card) 65'; Ljubičić (yellow card) 68'	Report	Jeong (yellow card) 81'; Höfler (yellow card) 83'	Stadium: RheinEnergieStadion; Attendance: 10,000; Referee: Felix Brych

11 February 2022 22	RB Leipzig	3–1	1. FC Köln	Leipzig
20:30 CET (UTC+1)	Nkunku 25'; Olmo 54'; Angeliño 57'; Gvardiol (yellow card) 62'	Report	Thielmann (yellow card) 9'; Hübers (yellow card) 35'; Lemperle 90+1'	Stadium: Red Bull Arena; Attendance: 15,000; Referee: Florian Badstübner

19 February 2022 23	1. FC Köln	1–0	Eintracht Frankfurt	Cologne
18:30 CET (UTC+1)	Andersson (yellow card) 46'; Modeste 84'	Report	Hinteregger (yellow card) 63'; Jakić (yellow card) 89'	Stadium: RheinEnergieStadion; Attendance: 10,000; Referee: Christian Dingert

26 February 2022 24	Greuther Fürth	1–1	1. FC Köln	Fürth
15:30 CET (UTC+1)	Tillman (yellow card) 22'; Griesbeck 69'	Report	Özcan (yellow card) 29'; Kainz 53'; Skhiri (yellow card) 71'	Stadium: Sportpark Ronhof; Attendance: 9,200; Referee: Robert Schröder

6 March 2022 25	1. FC Köln	0–1	1899 Hoffenheim	Cologne
17:30 CET (UTC+1)	Ljubičić (yellow card) 61'	Report	Posch 61'; Baumgartner (yellow card) 85'; Baumann (yellow card) 90+2'; Grillitsch (yellow card) 90+5'; Dabbur (yellow card) 90+5'	Stadium: RheinEnergieStadion; Attendance: 37,500; Referee: Marco Fritz

13 March 2022 26	Bayer Leverkusen	0–1	1. FC Köln	Leverkusen
15:30 CET (UTC+1)	Palacios (yellow card) 45+1'; Demirbay (yellow card) 90+2'	Report	Skhiri (yellow card) 52'; Schmitz (yellow card) 65'; Schindler 67'	Stadium: BayArena; Attendance: 22,658; Referee: Sascha Stegemann

20 March 2022 27	1. FC Köln	1–1	Borussia Dortmund	Cologne
19:30 CET (UTC+1)	Andersson 36'; Özcan (yellow card) 67'; Duda (yellow card) 76'	Report	Wolf 8', (yellow card) 30'; Witsel (yellow card) 43'; Can (yellow card) 47'	Stadium: RheinEnergieStadion; Attendance: 50,000; Referee: Daniel Siebert

1 April 2022 28	Union Berlin	1–0	1. FC Köln	Berlin
20:30 CEST (UTC+2)	Jaeckel (yellow card) 5'; Becker (yellow card) 42'; Awoniyi 49'; Trimmel (yellow card) 55'	Report	Ehizibue (yellow card) 13'; Hübers (yellow card) 62'; Thielmann (yellow card) 75'	Stadium: Stadion An der Alten Försterei; Attendance: 22,012; Referee: Florian Badstübner

9 April 2022 29	1. FC Köln	3–2	Mainz 05	Cologne
15:30 CEST (UTC+2)	Chabot (yellow card) 34'; Skhiri 60'; Ljubičić 78'; Modeste (yellow card) 79'; Kilian 82'	Report	Burkardt 14'; Martín (yellow card) 36'; Onisiwo 55'; Stach (yellow card) 65'	Stadium: RheinEnergieStadion; Attendance: 49,800; Referee: Martin Petersen

16 April 2022 30	Borussia Mönchengladbach	1–3	1. FC Köln	Mönchengladbach
18:30 CEST (UTC+2)	Koné (yellow card) 45'; Pléa (yellow card) 65'; Embolo 85'; Elvedi (yellow card) 86'	Report	Modeste 5'; Kainz 20'; Ljubičić 34'; Hector (yellow card) 69'; Hübers (yellow card) 72'	Stadium: Borussia-Park; Attendance: 54,042; Referee: Deniz Aytekin

23 April 2022 31	1. FC Köln	3–1	Arminia Bielefeld	Cologne
15:30 CEST (UTC+2)	Uth 3', (yellow card) 69'; Modeste 43'; Özcan (yellow card) 67'; Thielmann 86'	Report	Pieper (yellow card) 30'; Serra (yellow card) 32'; Hübers 33' (o.g.); Wimmer (yellow card) 38'	Stadium: RheinEnergieStadion; Attendance: 50,000; Referee: Tobias Stieler

30 April 2022 32	FC Augsburg	1–4	1. FC Köln	Augsburg
15:30 CEST (UTC+2)	Gruezo (yellow card) 42'; Oxford (yellow card) 69'; Niederlechner 73'	Report	Thielmann 12', (yellow card) 53'; Uth 15'; Kainz (yellow card) 60'; Modeste 63' (pen.), 78'; Hübers (yellow card) 75'; Kilian (yellow card) 80'	Stadium: WWK Arena; Attendance: 29,511; Referee: Robert Schröder

7 May 2022 33	1. FC Köln	0–1	VfL Wolfsburg	Cologne
15:30 CEST (UTC+2)		Report	Gerhardt 43'; L. Nmecha (yellow card) 50'; Białek (yellow card) 90+4'	Stadium: RheinEnergieStadion; Attendance: 50,000; Referee: Tobias Stieler

14 May 2022 34	VfB Stuttgart	2–1	1. FC Köln	Stuttgart
15:30 CEST (UTC+2)	Kalajdžić (penalty missed) 12', 12'; Endo 90+2'; Coulibaly (yellow card) 90+7'	Report	Modeste 60', (yellow card) 90'; Horn (yellow card) 79'; Schmitz (yellow card) 81'; Schwäbe (yellow card) 90+7'	Stadium: Mercedes-Benz Arena; Attendance: 52,230; Referee: Robert Schröder

=== DFB-Pokal ===
8 August 2021 First round	Carl Zeiss Jena	1–1 (a.e.t.) (2–4 p)	1. FC Köln	Jena
15:30 CEST (UTC+2)	Wolfram 5', (yellow card) 44'	Report	Skhiri 69'; Czichos (yellow card) 92'	Stadium: Ernst-Abbe-Sportfeld; Attendance: 2,728; Referee: Florian Badstübner
	Penalties
	Oesterhelweg (penalty missed); Bürger (penalty missed); Dedidis (penalty scored); Lange (penalty scored)		(penalty scored) Lemperle; (penalty scored) Schaub; (penalty scored) Thielmann; (penalty scored) Duda

27 October 2021 Second round	VfB Stuttgart	0–2	1. FC Köln	Stuttgart
20:45 CEST (UTC+2)	Ahamada (yellow card) 86'	Report	Modeste 72', 77'; Uth (yellow card) 75'	Stadium: Mercedes-Benz Arena; Attendance: 25,000; Referee: Deniz Aytekin

18 January 2022 Round of 16	1. FC Köln	1–1 (a.e.t.) (3–4 p)	Hamburger SV	Cologne
18:30 CET (UTC+1)	Hector (yellow card) 43'; Schindler (yellow card) 75'; Hübers (yellow card) 82'; Modeste 120+2' (pen.)	Report	Reis (yellow card) 90+3'; Glatzel 92'; Schonlau (yellow card) 120+1'	Stadium: RheinEnergieStadion; Attendance: 750; Referee: Daniel Schlager
	Penalties
	Özcan (penalty missed); Modeste (penalty scored); Ljubičić (penalty scored); Duda (penalty scored); Kainz (penalty missed)		(penalty scored) Kinsombi; (penalty missed) Kittel; (penalty scored) Vušković; (penalty scored) Gyamerah; (penalty scored) Schonlau

== Statistics ==
=== Appearances and goals ===
No.	Pos	Nat	Player	Total		Bundesliga		DFB-Pokal	
No.	Pos	Nat	Player	Apps	Goals	Apps	Goals	Apps	Goals
Goalkeepers
1	GK	(Germany) GER	Timo Horn	13	0	13	0	0	0
20	GK	(Germany) GER	Marvin Schwäbe	24	0	21	0	3	0
40	GK	(Germany) GER	Jonas Urbig	0	0	0	0	0	0
44	GK	(Germany) GER	Matthias Köbbing	0	0	0	0	0	0
Defenders
2	DF	(Germany) GER	Benno Schmitz	33	0	29+2	0	1+1	0
4	DF	(Germany) GER	Timo Hübers	23	1	20	1	3	0
5	DF	(Germany) GER	Bright Arrey-Mbi	0	0	0	0	0	0
14	DF	(Germany) GER	Jonas Hector	33	0	30	0	3	0
15	DF	(Germany) GER	Luca Kilian	31	1	25+5	1	1	0
19	DF	(Nigeria) NGR	Kingsley Ehizibue	18	0	6+10	0	2	0
23	DF	(Germany) GER	Jannes Horn	12	0	3+8	0	1	0
24	DF	(Germany) GER	Jeff Chabot	4	0	2+2	0	0	0
Midfielders
6	MF	(Germany) GER	Salih Özcan	34	2	26+5	2	2+1	0
7	MF	(Austria) AUT	Dejan Ljubicic	32	3	22+8	3	2	0
11	MF	(Austria) AUT	Florian Kainz	34	4	31+1	4	1+1	0
17	MF	(Ghana) GHA	Kingsley Schindler	20	1	1+17	1	2	0
18	MF	(Slovakia) SVK	Ondrej Duda	34	2	20+11	2	0+3	0
21	MF	(Austria) AUT	Louis Schaub	30	1	6+22	1	1+1	0
25	MF	(Germany) GER	Tim Lemperle	15	2	0+13	2	0+2	0
28	MF	(Tunisia) TUN	Ellyes Skhiri	23	5	20+2	4	0+1	1
31	MF	(Czech Republic) CZE	Tomáš Ostrák	6	0	0+5	0	1	0
47	MF	(Luxembourg) LUX	Mathias Olesen	3	0	0+3	0	0	0
Forwards
9	FW	(Sweden) SWE	Sebastian Andersson	29	3	13+13	3	2+1	0
13	FW	(Germany) GER	Mark Uth	33	5	24+6	5	2+1	0
27	FW	(France) FRA	Anthony Modeste	34	23	30+1	20	1+2	3
29	FW	(Germany) GER	Jan Thielmann	32	3	10+19	3	3	0
30	FW	(Germany) GER	Marvin Obuz	1	0	0	0	0+1	0
Players transferred out during the season
3	DF	(Germany) GER	Noah Katterbach	1	0	0+1	0	0	0
5	DF	(Germany) GER	Rafael Czichos	18	0	16+1	0	1	0
22	DF	(Spain) ESP	Jorge Meré	9	0	5+3	0	1	0
26	DF	(Serbia) SRB	Sava-Arangel Cestic	0	0	0	0	0	0

Last updated: 14 May 2022
Source: Competitions

=== Goalscorers ===
Rank	Pos	No.	Nat	Name	Bundesliga	DFB-Pokal	Total
1	FW	27	(France)	Anthony Modeste	20	3	23
2	MF	28	(Tunisia)	Ellyes Skhiri	4	1	5
2	FW	13	(Germany)	Mark Uth	5	0	5
3	MF	11	(Austria)	Florian Kainz	4	0	4
4	MF	6	(Germany)	Salih Özcan	3	0	3
4	MF	7	(Austria)	Dejan Ljubicic	3	0	3
4	FW	9	(Sweden)	Sebastian Andersson	3	0	3
4	FW	29	(Germany)	Jan Thielmann	3	0	3
9	MF	18	(Slovakia)	Ondrej Duda	2	0	2
9	MF	25	(Germany)	Tim Lemperle	2	0	2
11	DF	4	(Germany)	Timo Hübers	1	0	1
11	DF	15	(Germany)	Luca Kilian	1	0	1
11	MF	17	(Ghana)	Kingsley Schindler	1	0	1
11	MF	21	(Austria)	Louis Schaub	1	0	1
Own goals					0	0	0
Totals					52	4	56

Last updated: 14 May 2022
