= Tim Lemperle =

German footballer

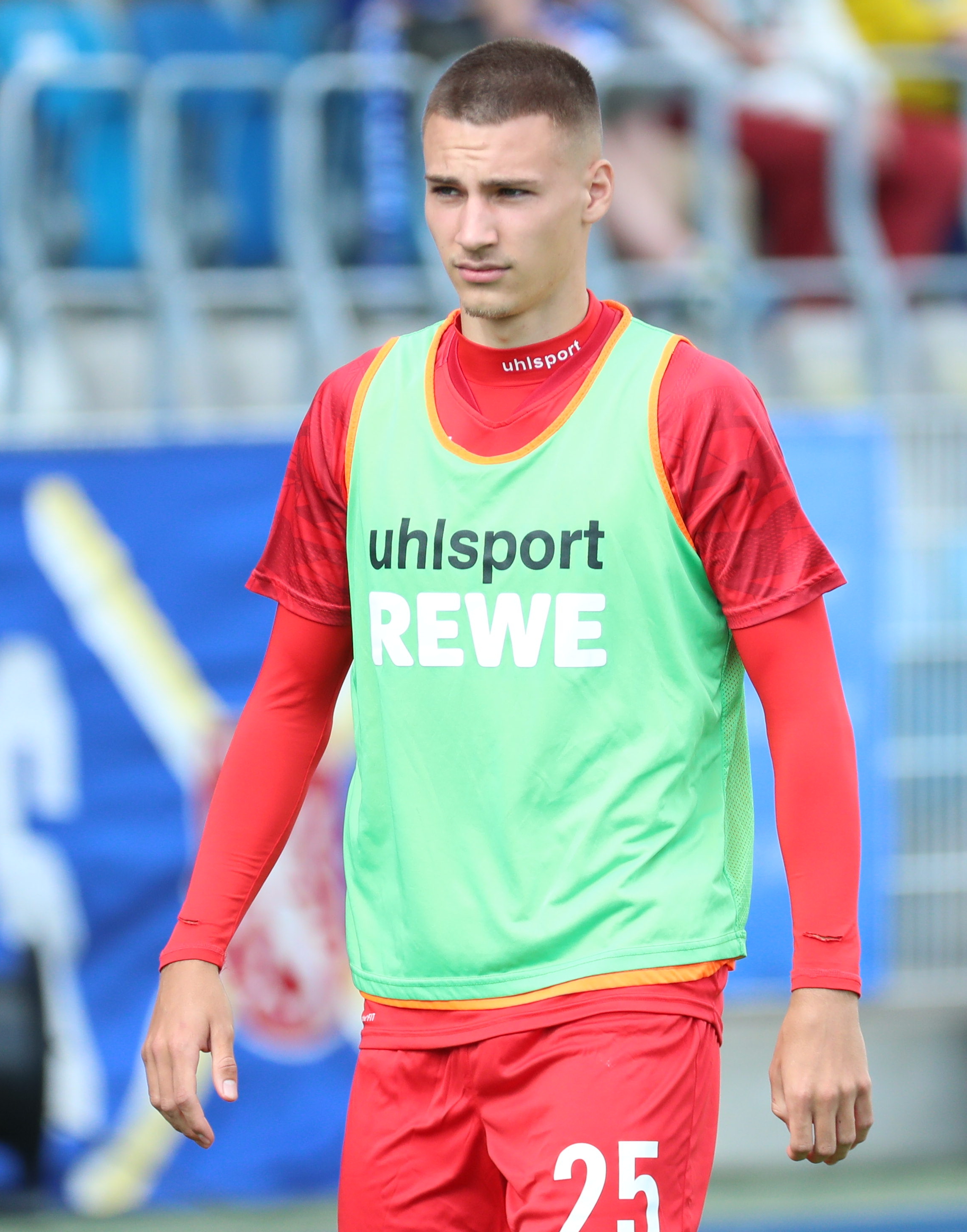
- Lemperle in 2021

Personal information
- Date of birth: 5 February 2002 (age 24)
- Place of birth: Frankfurt am Main, Germany
- Height: 1.87 m (6 ft 2 in)
- Position: Forward

Team information
- Current team: TSG Hoffenheim
- Number: 19

Youth career
- TuS Makkabi Frankfurt
- Mainz 05
- –2017: FSV Frankfurt
- 2017–2020: 1. FC Köln

Senior career*
Years	Team	Apps	(Gls)
2020–2023	1. FC Köln II	41	(16)
2020–2025	1. FC Köln	51	(12)
2023–2024	→ Greuther Fürth (loan)	32	(6)
2025–	TSG Hoffenheim	35	(9)

International career^{‡}
2018–2019	Germany U17	8	(1)
2019	Germany U18	2	(0)
2020	Germany U19	1	(0)
2021–2022	Germany U20	3	(1)
2022–2024	Germany U21	10	(2)
- * Club domestic league appearances and goals as of 31 October 2026 ‡ National team caps and goals as of 10:22, 16 October 2024 (UTC)

Tim Lemperle (born 5 February 2002) is a German professional footballer who plays as a forward for Bundesliga club TSG Hoffenheim.

== Club career ==
Lemperle began his career at TuS Makkabi Frankfurt. After stints in the youth academies of Mainz 05 and FSV Frankfurt, he joined 1.FC Köln in the summer of 2017. In early 2020, he was promoted to the club's first squad. In May 2020, it was announced that Lemperle had signed his first professional contract that would keep him at the club until July 2023. In February 2023, his contract was extended until July 2025. In July 2023, he joined 2. Bundesliga club Greuther Fürth on a one-year loan deal.

In June 2025, it was announced that Lemperle would join TSG Hoffenheim on a free transfer for the 2025–26 season.

== International career ==
Lemperle has represented Germany's youth squads, beginning with the association's U17 team. Since 2020, he has appeared for his country's U19 squad.

== Career statistics ==
As of match played 31 October 2026

Appearances and goals by club, season and competition
Club	Season	League			National cup		Continental		Other		Total	
Club	Season	Division	Apps	Goals	Apps	Goals	Apps	Goals	Apps	Goals	Apps	Goals
1. FC Köln	2019–20	Bundesliga	1	0	0	0	—		—		1	0
1. FC Köln	2020–21	Bundesliga	0	0	1	0	—		—		1	0
1. FC Köln	2021–22	Bundesliga	13	2	2	0	—		—		15	2
1. FC Köln	2022–23	Bundesliga	12	0	1	0	1	0	—		14	0
1. FC Köln	2024–25	2. Bundesliga	25	10	3	1	—		—		28	11
1. FC Köln	Total		51	12	7	1	1	0	0	0	58	13
1. FC Köln II	2020–21	Regionalliga West	27	10	—		—		—		27	10
1. FC Köln II	2021–22	Regionalliga West	7	2	—		—		—		7	2
1. FC Köln II	2022–23	Regionalliga West	7	4	—		—		—		7	4
1. FC Köln II	Total		41	16	0	0	0	0	0	0	41	16
Greuther Fürth (loan)	2023–24	2. Bundesliga	32	6	2	0	—		—		34	6
1899 Hoffenheim	2025–26	Bundesliga	29	8	2	0	—		—		31	8
1899 Hoffenheim	2026–27	Bundesliga	6	1	2	0	3 (Note: Appearances in UEFA Europa League)	0	—		11	1
1899 Hoffenheim	Total		35	9	4	0	3	0	—		42	9
Career total			159	43	13	1	3	0	0	0	175	44

== Honours ==
1.FC Koln

- 2.Bundesliga: 2024–25
