= Marvin Schwäbe =

German footballer (born 1995)

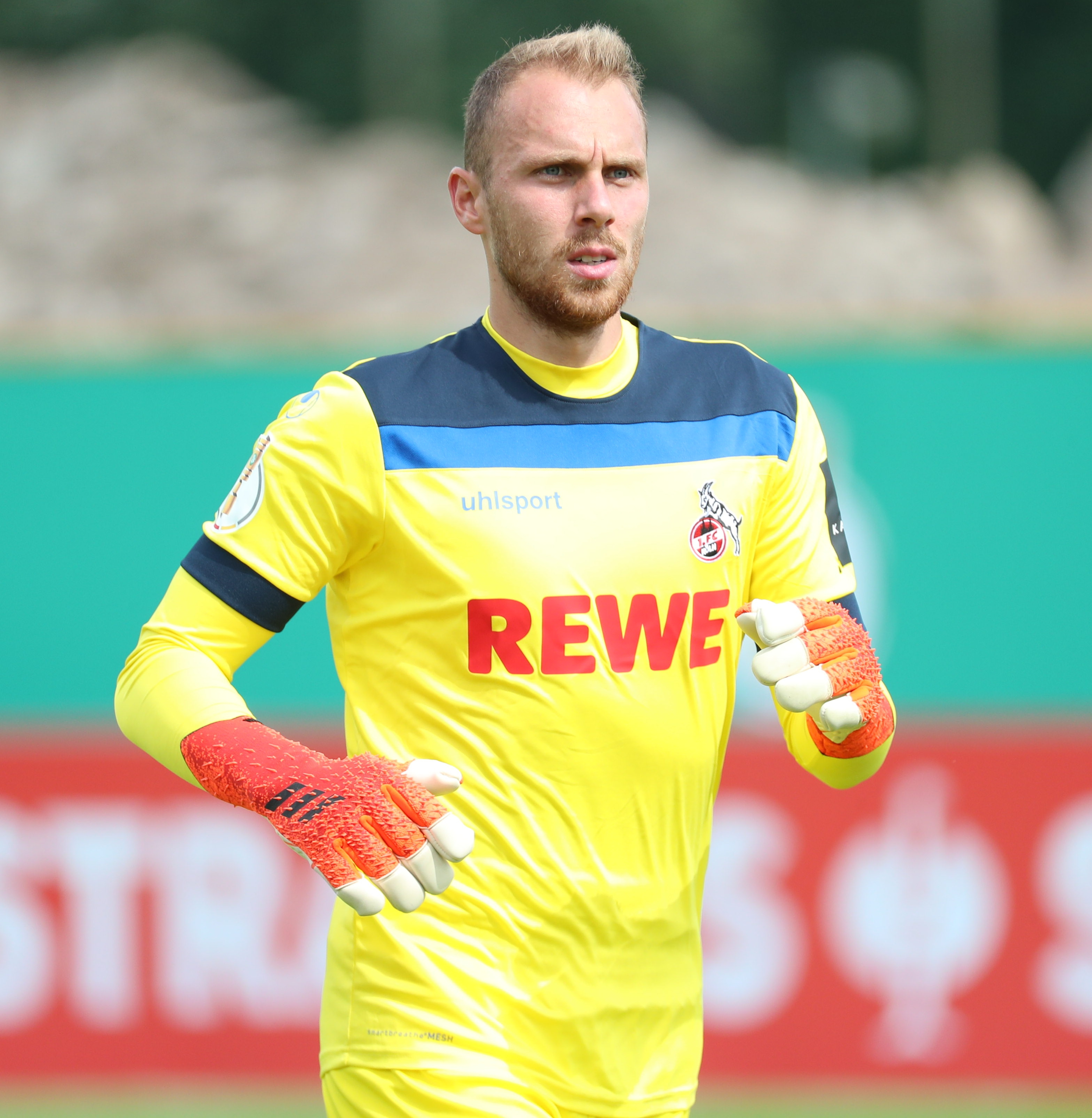
- Schwäbe with 1. FC Köln in 2021

Personal information
- Date of birth: 25 April 1995 (age 31)
- Place of birth: Dieburg, Germany
- Height: 1.90 m (6 ft 3 in)
- Position: Goalkeeper

Team information
- Current team: 1. FC Köln
- Number: 1

Youth career
- SC Hassia Dieburg
- Kickers Offenbach
- 2010–2013: Eintracht Frankfurt
- 2013–2014: TSG Hoffenheim

Senior career*
Years	Team	Apps	(Gls)
2012–2013	Eintracht Frankfurt II	9	(0)
2013–2015	TSG Hoffenheim II	40	(0)
2015–2018	TSG Hoffenheim	0	(0)
2015–2016	→ VfL Osnabrück (loan)	38	(0)
2016–2018	→ Dynamo Dresden (loan)	56	(0)
2018–2021	Brøndby	105	(0)
2021–	1. FC Köln	155	(0)

International career^{‡}
2015–2017	Germany U21	4	(0)
Medal record
UEFA European Under-21 Championship
Winner	2017
- * Club domestic league appearances and goals as of 1 November 2026 ‡ National team caps and goals as of 21:25, 11 February 2022 (UTC)

Marvin Schwäbe (born 25 April 1995) is a German professional footballer who plays as a goalkeeper for Bundesliga club 1. FC Köln.

He came to Cologne from Brøndby for the 2021 season. Before that, he had been with Hoffenheim, but mainly on loan to other German clubs. He has been capped by Germany at youth level.

== Club career ==
=== Early career ===
A goalkeeper, Schwäbe started his career at local club SC Hassia Dieburg before moving to Kickers Offenbach. In 2009, he was picked up by Eintracht Frankfurt. On 5 October 2012, while still an active part of the youth team, he made his first call-up for the second team in the 3–1 loss to Wormatia Worms in the Regionalliga Südwest.

=== Hoffenheim ===
In 2013, Schwäbe was signed by Hoffenheim and played for their second team the following season, also in the Regionalliga Südwest while playing for the club's under-19 side. With the latter he won the German Under 19 championship. For the 2014–15 Bundesliga season, he was promoted to the first team while still making appearances for the second team.

Schwäbe joined 3. Liga club Osnabrück on loan for the 2015–16 season. On 25 July 2015, he made his 3. Liga debut in the 0–0 match against Erzgebirge Aue.

In the 2016–17 season, Schwäbe was loaned out once again, this time to 2. Bundesliga club Dynamo Dresden. On 6 August 2016, he made his 2. Bundesliga debut in the 1–1 match against 1. FC Nürnberg. On 19 May 2017, the loan was extended for one season more.

=== Brøndby ===
After the 2017–18 season, Schwäbe returned to Hoffenheim, where he was signed by Danish Superliga side Brøndby as a replacement for Frederik Rønnow who had in turn been signed by Eintracht Frankfurt. Schwäbe signed a three-year deal with the club. At Brøndby, he grew out to become the undisputed starter in goal, both under fellow German Alexander Zorniger, and later under head coach Niels Frederiksen. During his stint in Denmark, he was rumoured to return to German football multiple times, included interest from Stuttgart in 2019 and 2020, but a move did not materialise both times.

On 1 June 2021 Schwäbe confirmed, that he would leave Brøndby at the end of his contract on 30 June 2021.

=== 1. FC Köln ===
On 1 July 2021, it was reported that Schwäbe had joined Bundesliga side 1. FC Köln on a free transfer to become the backup to starting goalkeeper Timo Horn. He made his debut on 8 August in the DFB-Pokal match against Carl Zeiss Jena, where his team won after a penalty-shootout. He became the starting goalkeeper for Köln in the 2021–22 season. He became the club's captain ahead of the 2025–26 season.

== Career statistics ==
As of match played 1 November 2026

Appearances and goals by club, season and competition
Club	Season	League			National cup (Note: Includes DFB-Pokal, Danish Cup)		Continental		Total	
Club	Season	Division	Apps	Goals	Apps	Goals	Apps	Goals	Apps	Goals
Eintracht Frankfurt II	2012–13	Regionalliga Südwest	9	0	—		—		9	0
TSG Hoffenheim II	2013–14	Regionalliga Südwest	17	0	—		—		17	0
TSG Hoffenheim II	2014–15	Regionalliga Südwest	23	0	—		—		23	0
TSG Hoffenheim II	Total		40	0	—		—		40	0
TSG Hoffenheim	2014–15	Bundesliga	0	0	0	0	—		0	0
VfL Osnabrück (loan)	2015–16	3. Liga	38	0	4	0	—		42	0
Dynamo Dresden (loan)	2016–17	2. Bundesliga	33	0	2	0	—		35	0
Dynamo Dresden (loan)	2017–18	2. Bundesliga	25	0	1	0	—		26	0
Dynamo Dresden (loan)	Total		58	0	3	0	—		61	0
Brøndby	2018–19	Danish Superliga	37	0	3	0	4 (Note: Appearances in UEFA Europa League)	0	44	0
Brøndby	2019–20	Danish Superliga	36	0	2	0	6	0	44	0
Brøndby	2020–21	Danish Superliga	32	0	1	0	—		33	0
Brøndby	Total		105	0	6	0	10	0	121	0
1. FC Köln	2021–22	Bundesliga	21	0	3	0	—		24	0
1. FC Köln	2022–23	Bundesliga	34	0	0	0	8 (Note: Appearances in UEFA Europa Conference League)	0	42	0
1. FC Köln	2023–24	Bundesliga	34	0	2	0	0	0	36	0
1. FC Köln	2024–25	2. Bundesliga	24	0	3	0	—		27	0
1. FC Köln	2025–26	Bundesliga	34	0	0	0	—		34	0
1. FC Köln	2026–27	Bundesliga	8	0	2	0	—		10	0
1. FC Köln	Total		155	0	10	0	8	0	173	0
Career total			405	0	23	0	18	0	446	0

== Honours ==
Brøndby

- Danish Superliga: 2020–21

1.FC Koln

- 2.Bundesliga: 2024–25

Germany

- UEFA European Under-21 Championship: 2017

Individual

- kicker Bundesliga Team of the Season: 2021–22
