= Nikola Soldo =

Croatian footballer

Personal information
- Date of birth: 25 January 2001 (age 25)
- Place of birth: Stuttgart, Germany
- Height: 1.89 m (6 ft 2 in)
- Position: Defender

Team information
- Current team: Botev Plovdiv
- Number: 4

Youth career
- 2006–2010: Dinamo Zagreb
- 2010–2011: Lokomotiva Zagreb
- 2011–2013: Zagreb
- 2013–2014: HAŠK
- 2014–2015: Tekstilac Ravnice
- 2015–2019: Inter Zaprešić

Senior career*
| Years | Team | Apps | (Gls) |
| 2019–2021 | Inter Zaprešić | 55 | (3) |
| 2021–2022 | Lokomotiva Zagreb | 37 | (2) |
| 2022–2025 | 1. FC Köln | 7 | (0) |
| 2023–2024 | → 1. FC Kaiserslautern (loan) | 15 | (0) |
| 2024–2025 | 1. FC Köln II | 16 | (0) |
| 2025– | Botev Plovdiv | 26 | (1) |

International career^{‡}
| 2019 | Croatia U18 | 3 | (0) |
| 2019–2020 | Croatia U19 | 3 | (0) |
| 2023 | Croatia U20 | 2 | (0) |
| 2021–2023 | Croatia U21 | 10 | (1) |
- * Club domestic league appearances and goals as of 11 June 2026 ‡ National team caps and goals as of 7 June 2023

Nikola Soldo (born 25 January 2001) is a Croatian professional footballer who plays as a defender for Botev Plovdiv.

== Club career ==
He began his career in the Dinamo Zagreb youth system, joining the club in 2008 during his father Zvonimir's managerial spell with the first team. He was recognized as a promising talent, even before his teenage years. He bounced around with several clubs before settling at Inter Zaprešić in 2015.

Soldo made his professional debut on 16 August 2019 as a member of the starting lineup during a 2–1 loss to Dinamo Zagreb. Three months later, he scored his first goal in the final minutes of a defeat to Rijeka.

On 15 June 2021, Soldo joined Lokomotiva Zagreb.

On 1 September 2022, the last day of the German transfer window, Soldo was transferred to Bundesliga club 1. FC Köln. He signed a contract until 2025 with the club.

On 16 August 2023, Soldo moved on loan to 1. FC Kaiserslautern in 2. Bundesliga.

On 18 February 2025, Soldo's contract with Köln was terminated by mutual consent.

== Personal life ==
His father Zvonimir was a long-time member of the Croatia national team, notably playing at the UEFA Euro 1996, and the 1998 and 2002 FIFA World Cups. At the club level, he played with Dinamo Zagreb, Zadar and Inter Zaprešić in his native country before finishing his career with a ten-year spell at VfB Stuttgart. Nikola was born in Stuttgart in 2001, midway through his father's fifth season in Germany.

His older brothers, Matija and Filip, are footballers as well, with Filip currently representing Inter Zaprešić.

== Career statistics ==
=== Club ===
As of 19 July 2025

Appearances and goals by club, season and competition
| Club | Season | League | | | Cup | | Continental | | Total | |
| Club | Season | Division | Apps | Goals | Apps | Goals | Apps | Goals | Apps | Goals |
|---|---|---|---|---|---|---|---|---|---|---|
| Inter Zaprešić | 2019–20 | Prva HNL | 27 | 1 | 1 | 0 | — | | 28 | 1 |
| Inter Zaprešić | 2020–21 | Prva NL | 28 | 2 | 1 | 0 | — | | 29 | 2 |
| Inter Zaprešić | Total | | 55 | 3 | 2 | 0 | 0 | 0 | 57 | 3 |
| Lokomotiva Zagreb | 2021–22 | Prva HNL | 31 | 2 | 2 | 0 | — | | 33 | 2 |
| Lokomotiva Zagreb | 2022–23 | Prva HNL | 6 | 0 | 0 | 0 | — | | 6 | 0 |
| Lokomotiva Zagreb | Total | | 37 | 2 | 2 | 0 | 0 | 0 | 39 | 2 |
| Köln | 2022–23 | Bundesliga | 7 | 0 | 0 | 0 | 4 | 0 | 11 | 0 |
| Kaiserslautern (loan) | 2023–24 | 2. Bundesliga | 15 | 0 | 2 | 0 | — | | 17 | 0 |
| Köln II | 2024–25 | Regionalliga | 16 | 0 | 0 | 0 | — | | 16 | 0 |
| Botev Plovdiv | 2025–26 | First League | 1 | 0 | 0 | 0 | — | | 1 | 0 |
| Career total | | | 118 | 5 | 6 | 0 | 4 | 0 | 141 | 5 |
