= Maximilian Schmid =

German footballer (born 2003)

Personal information
- Date of birth: 5 March 2003 (age 23)
- Place of birth: Ranstadt, Germany
- Height: 1.84 m (6 ft 0 in)
- Position: Forward

Team information
- Current team: Kickers Offenbach
- Number: 9

Youth career
- –2016: FSV Frankfurt
- 2016–2018: Mainz 05
- 2018–2022: 1. FC Köln

Senior career*
Years	Team	Apps	(Gls)
2022–2025	1. FC Köln II	45	(15)
2022–2025	1. FC Köln	0	(0)
2023–2024	→ Roda JC (loan)	33	(6)
2025–2026	Erzgebirge Aue	33	(1)
2026–	Kickers Offenbach	8	(5)

International career
2018	Germany U15	1	(1)
2018	Germany U16	2	(0)
- * Club domestic league appearances and goals as of 24 September 2026

Maximilian Schmid (born 5 March 2003) is a German professional footballer who plays as a forward for Kickers Offenbach.

== Club career ==
=== 1. FC Köln ===
Schmid progressed through the FSV Frankfurt and Mainz 05 academies, before moving to the youth department of 1. FC Köln in 2018. There, he made 24 appearances in the Under 17 Bundesliga, 18 appearances in the Under 19 Bundesliga, and two appearances in the 2021–22 edition of the UEFA Youth League, scoring a total of 17 goals across Cologne's youth teams. He won the Under 17 Bundesliga title with the club in 2019, beating the Borussia Dortmund under-17 team 3–2 in the final.

In the summer of 2022, he was included in the second team roster, competing in the Regionalliga West. He also extended his contract until 2024. During the 2022–23 season, he was also part of the first-team matchday squad for two Bundesliga games, without making an appearance. On 27 October 2022, Schmid made his professional debut, replacing Linton Maina in the 90th minute of a 1–0 away victory against 1. FC Slovácko in the UEFA Europa Conference League group stage.

==== Roda JC (loan) ====
On 8 August 2023, Schmid was sent on a one-season loan to Dutch second division club Roda JC. At the same time, his contract with Die Geißböcke was extended until 2025. He made his competitive debut for the club on the first matchday of the season, starting in a 4–1 home win over Helmond Sport on 11 August. On 9 September, he scored his first goal for De Koempels, helping his side to a 3–1 away victory against NAC Breda.

=== Erzgebirge Aue ===
On 30 January 2025, Schmid joined Erzgebirge Aue of the 3. Liga. He debuted two days later, coming on for Omar Sijarić in the 77th minute of a 2–1 defeat away to Dynamo Dresden. A syndesmosis injury in mid-April ended his 2024–25 campaign early.

Schmid scored his first Aue goal on 30 August 2025, making it 2–1 in a 4–1 loss away to 1. FC Saarbrücken.

== International career ==
In the 2018, Schmid played a total of three matches for the Germany under-15 and under-16 teams, scoring one goal.

== Career statistics ==
As of match played 5 October 2025

Appearances and goals by club, season and competition
Club	Season	League			National cup		Europe		Other		Total	
Club	Season	Division	Apps	Goals	Apps	Goals	Apps	Goals	Apps	Goals	Apps	Goals
1. FC Köln II	2021–22	Regionalliga West	1	0	—		—		—		1	0
1. FC Köln II	2022–13	Regionalliga West	29	13	—		—		—		29	13
1. FC Köln II	2024–25	Regionalliga West	15	2	—		—		—		15	2
1. FC Köln II	Total		45	15	—		—		—		45	15
1. FC Köln	2022–23	Bundesliga	0	0	0	0	1 (Note: Appearance(s) in UEFA Europa Conference League)	0	—		1	0
Roda JC (loan)	2023–24	Eerste Divisie	33	6	0	0	—		1 (Note: Appearances in Eredivisie promotion/relegation playoffs)	0	34	6
Erzgebirge Aue	2024–25	3. Liga	10	0	0	0	—		—		10	0
Erzgebirge Aue	2025–26	3. Liga	9	1	0	0	—		—		10	0
Erzgebirge Aue	Total		19	1	0	0	—		—		19	1
Career total			97	22	0	0	1	0	1	0	99	22
