= Ondrej Duda =

Slovak footballer

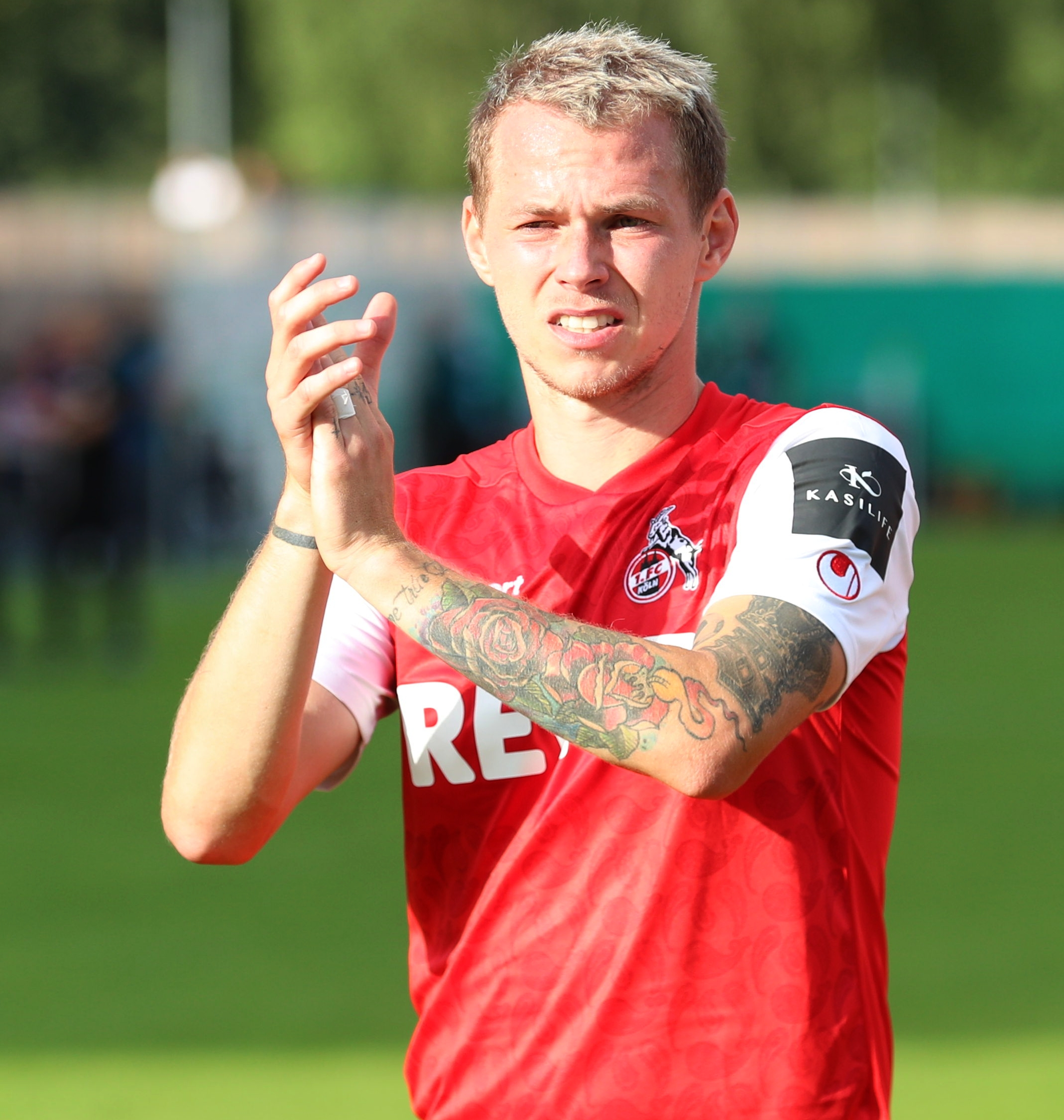
- Duda with 1. FC Köln in 2021

Personal information
- Date of birth: 5 December 1994 (age 31)
- Place of birth: Snina, Slovakia
- Height: 1.81 m (5 ft 11 in)
- Position: Midfielder

Team information
- Current team: Al-Ettifaq
- Number: 11

Youth career
- –2011: Snina
- 2011–2013: Košice

Senior career*
Years	Team	Apps	(Gls)
2012–2014	Košice	33	(5)
2014–2016	Legia Warsaw	67	(10)
2016–2020	Hertha BSC	59	(12)
2020	→ Norwich City (loan)	10	(0)
2020–2023	1. FC Köln	76	(9)
2023	→ Hellas Verona (loan)	15	(0)
2023–2025	Hellas Verona	60	(2)
2025–	Al-Ettifaq	34	(1)

International career^{‡}
2012–2013	Slovakia U19	5	(4)
2013–2014	Slovakia U21	7	(3)
2014–	Slovakia	99	(17)
- * Club domestic league appearances and goals as of 21:14, 11 September 2026 (UTC) ‡ National team caps and goals as of 14:14, 15 November 2026 (UTC)

Ondrej Duda (Slovak pronunciation: [ˈɔndrej ˈduda]; born 5 December 1994) is a Slovak professional footballer who plays as a midfielder for Saudi Pro League club Al-Ettifaq and the Slovakia national team.

== Club career ==
Duda began his football career at his hometown club MFK Snina. He later moved to Košice, where he rose through the youth team ranks, making his first-team debut for the club at the age of 17 as a late substitute during a 1–0 home win against Slovan Bratislava.

In the winter of 2013–14, Duda decided to not extend his contract with Košice, which would expire the following summer. In February 2014, Duda then joined Legia Warsaw on a four-and-a-half-year deal.

On 30 July 2015, Duda was hit by a stone in Legia's UEFA Europa League qualifier away at Kukesi in Albania, being stretchered off and the match abandoned. The game was awarded as a 3–0 Legia victory and their opponents were fined €70,000 and forced to play their next European home match behind closed doors.

=== Hertha BSC ===
On 20 July 2016, Duda signed for Bundesliga side Hertha Berlin on a five-year deal. After being sidelined with a knee injury shortly after signing and also undergoing knee surgery in November 2016, Duda made his competitive debut for Hertha on 25 February 2017 in a 2–0 win over Eintracht Frankfurt as an 89th-minute substitute, 7 months after signing with the club. Duda famously scored against Bayern Munich, as he smashed home a cross into the roof of the Bayern net, past a helpless Manuel Neuer. Duda's goal was Hertha Berlin's second goal against Bayern, as the Slovak international inspired the Berliners to a 2–0 victory over the German champions.

Duda experienced a good year with Hertha in the 2018–2019 season. He played in 32 of the 34 Bundesliga games, scoring 11 goals and adding 6 assists. Even though Hertha had failed to qualify for any European competitions in the subsequent season, finishing 11th and 11 points behind Europa League positions, Duda was spotted and inquired about by Sevilla, as reported in mid-May 2019. Sevilla was to send an offer to Berlin, even meeting with Duda's father. Hertha manager Pal Dardai was full of praise for the excellent Duda, saying the following about the world class Slovak playmaker, "Duda can do things with the ball that very few here can".

Duda's 2019–2020 season with Hertha was not as good, as the previous one. Duda started the season with a new manager. Pál Dárdai, who led Hertha from the time of Duda's arrival, was replaced over the summer by Ante Čović. He was fielded in the starting line-up in the first five rounds of Bundesliga, following the trend from last seasons. Of the following twelve games, however, Duda only starred in two, recording a total of just over 94 minutes in these matches against Hoffenheim and Eintracht Frankfurt. Appointment of Jürgen Klinsmann, a former World Cup winner and a successful international manager, on 29 November 2019, was traced to be a partial reason for Duda's absence from the first team. After Duda was left off the bench for four games, being relegated to reserves for one of them, it was revealed that Klinsmann did not include Duda in his plans for Hertha, despite Duda's intention to remain with the side. Duda was subsequently free to look for a different club. Before his departure, Duda was fielded in seven Bundesliga games and two Pokal fixtures. He scored his only goal in a cup fixture against Dynamo Dresden.

==== Loan at Norwich City ====
Duda was loaned to Norwich City for the rest of the 2019–20 season on 12 January 2020. He had commented, that he intends to be entertained by the game again and is happy about a move to an even better league, hoping for notable play-time.

He made his debut and first starting line-up appearance on a first possible occasion, on 18 January 2020, in a home fixture against Bournemouth. After some 30 minutes of play, Duda had made a goal-bound shot, that had beaten Cherries' goalkeeper Aaron Ramsdale. His premier goal was however denied, after a handball by Steve Cook, who was subsequently sent-off. Teemu Pukki had converted the resulting penalty with his 10th goal of the season, to secure a narrow 1–0 victory for the home side. In a post-match interview, Duda had stated he was relieved that Pukki had converted the penalty and was glad about the victory. He was applauded for smart play with other attacking players and his debut was commented on as "impressive".

Despite a goal-less stay at Norwich, Duda was praised for his professionalism and character by the Canaries' manager Daniel Farke, who permitted Duda's early return to Hertha, after Norwich's relegation was guaranteed, as a sign of mutual respect.

=== 1. FC Köln ===
In September 2020, it was announced that Duda had signed a four-year contract with Bundesliga side 1.FC Köln. The move came days after Hertha had bought Colombian striker Jhon Córdoba from the same club.

=== Hellas Verona ===
On 29 January 2023, Köln announced that Duda would join Serie A side Hellas Verona on loan until the end of the season. After the club avoided relegation at the end of the season, Duda joined the club on a permanent basis for a reported fee of around €2 million.

=== Al Ettifaq ===
On 17 July 2025, it was announced that Duda would be joining Saudi Arabian club Al-Ettifaq.

== International career ==
Duda made his international debut for Slovakia on 18 November 2014, replacing Marek Hamšík in the 59th minute of a 2–1 friendly win over Finland in Žilina.

Duda scored Slovakia's first goal in their UEFA Euro 2016 campaign with an equalising goal to make it 1–1 against Wales. Slovakia went on to lose 2–1. His first goal in any of the qualifying competitions was scored in the 10th game of the 2018 FIFA World Cup qualification against Malta (3–0 win), sealing the second place in the group for Slovakia.

Duda was a regular member of the national team under Pavel Hapal as well as Štefan Tarkovič, although commonly unavailable due to injuries. He continued to feature under Francesco Calzona. In March 2023, following a goal-less home draw versus Luxembourg, Erik Farkaš of Denník Šport wrote critically of Duda's overall national team performances arguing that despite prime age of 28 years, he did not appear capable of replacing Marek Hamšík after his international retirement in creativity and game organisation, though he was often fitted into the position by multiple experts.

On 7 June 2024, he was named in Francesco Calzona's 26-man Slovakia squad for UEFA Euro 2024. On 26 June, in the final group-stage match against Romania, he scored his first goal of the tournament from an assist by Juraj Kucka.

== Career statistics ==
=== Club ===
As of match played 11 September 2026

Appearances and goals by club, season and competition
Club	Season	League			National cup (Note: Includes Slovak Cup, Polish Cup, DFB-Pokal, FA Cup, Coppa Italia, King's Cup)		Continental		Other		Total	
Club	Season	Division	Apps	Goals	Apps	Goals	Apps	Goals	Apps	Goals	Apps	Goals
Košice	2012–13	Slovak Super Liga	14	0	3	1	—		—		17	1
Košice	2013–14	Slovak Super Liga	19	5	2	0	—		—		21	5
Košice	Total		33	5	5	1	—		—		38	6
Legia Warsaw	2013–14	Ekstraklasa	12	3	—		—		—		12	3
Legia Warsaw	2014–15	Ekstraklasa	27	5	5	0	12 (Note: Four appearances in UEFA Champions League, eight appearances and three goals in UEFA Europa League)	3	0	0	44	8
Legia Warsaw	2015–16	Ekstraklasa	27	2	4	1	11 (Note: Appearances in UEFA Europa League)	2	1 (Note: Appearance in Polish Super Cup)	0	43	5
Legia Warsaw	2016–17	Ekstraklasa	1	0	—		1 (Note: Appearance in UEFA Champions League)	0	0	0	2	0
Legia Warsaw	Total		67	10	9	1	24	5	1	0	101	16
Hertha BSC	2016–17	Bundesliga	3	0	0	0	0	0	—		3	0
Hertha BSC	2017–18	Bundesliga	17	1	2	0	4	0	—		23	1
Hertha BSC	2018–19	Bundesliga	32	11	3	0	—		—		35	11
Hertha BSC	2019–20	Bundesliga	7	0	2	1	—		—		9	1
Hertha BSC	2020–21	Bundesliga	0	0	1	0	—		—		1	0
Hertha BSC	Total		59	12	8	1	4	0	—		71	13
Hertha BSC II	2017–18	Regionalliga Nordost	1	0	—		—		—		1	0
Hertha BSC II	2019–20	Regionalliga Nordost	1	0	—		—		—		1	0
Hertha BSC II	Total		2	0	—		—		—		2	0
Norwich City (loan)	2019–20	Premier League	10	0	2	0	—		—		12	0
1. FC Köln	2020–21	Bundesliga	32	7	2	0	—		2 (Note: Appearances in Bundesliga promotion/relegation play-offs)	0	36	7
1. FC Köln	2021–22	Bundesliga	31	2	3	0	—		—		34	2
1. FC Köln	2022–23	Bundesliga	13	0	0	0	5 (Note: Appearances in UEFA Europa Conference League)	2	—		18	2
1. FC Köln	Total		76	9	5	0	5	2	2	0	88	11
Hellas Verona (loan)	2022–23	Serie A	15	0	—		—		0	0	15	0
Hellas Verona	2023–24	Serie A	32	1	1	0	—		—		33	1
Hellas Verona	2024–25	Serie A	28	1	1	0	—		—		29	1
Hellas Verona	Verona total		75	2	2	0	—		0	0	77	2
Al-Ettifaq	2025–26	Saudi Pro League	27	0	1	0	—		—		28	0
Al-Ettifaq	2026–27	Saudi Pro League	7	1	1	0	—		—		8	0
Al-Ettifaq	Total		34	1	2	0	—		—		36	1
Career total			356	39	33	3	33	7	3	0	425	48

=== International ===
As of match played 13 November 2026

Appearances and goals by national team and year
National team	Year	Apps	Goals
Slovakia	2014	1	0
Slovakia	2015	6	1
Slovakia	2016	7	1
Slovakia	2017	7	1
Slovakia	2018	9	1
Slovakia	2019	6	1
Slovakia	2020	6	0
Slovakia	2021	12	4
Slovakia	2022	7	1
Slovakia	2023	8	2
Slovakia	2024	12	3
Slovakia	2025	9	0
Slovakia	2026	9	2
Total		99	17

Scores and results list Slovakia goal tally first, score column indicates score after each Duda goal.

List of international goals scored by Ondrej Duda
No.	Date	Venue	Cap	Opponent	Score	Result	Competition
1	31 March 2015	Štadión pod Dubňom, Žilina, Slovakia	2	Czech Republic	1–0	1–0	Friendly
2	11 June 2016	Nouveau Stade de Bordeaux, Bordeaux, France	12	Wales	1–1	1–2	UEFA Euro 2016
3	8 October 2017	Štadión Antona Malatinského, Trnava, Slovakia	19	Malta	3–0	3–0	2018 FIFA World Cup qualification
4	25 March 2018	Rajamangala National Stadium, Bangkok, Thailand	23	Thailand	1–0	3–2	2018 King's Cup
5	21 March 2019	Štadión Antona Malatinského, Trnava, Slovakia	31	Hungary	1–0	2–0	UEFA Euro 2020 qualifying
6	11 November 2021	Štadión Antona Malatinského, Trnava, Slovakia	53	Slovenia	1–1	2–2	2022 FIFA World Cup qualification
7	14 November 2021	National Stadium, Ta' Qali, Malta	54	Malta	2–0	6–0	2022 FIFA World Cup qualification
8	14 November 2021	National Stadium, Ta' Qali, Malta	54	Malta	4–0	6–0	2022 FIFA World Cup qualification
9	14 November 2021	National Stadium, Ta' Qali, Malta	54	Malta	6–0	6–0	2022 FIFA World Cup qualification
10	29 March 2022	Estadio Nueva Condomina, Murcia, Spain	56	Finland	1–0	2–0	Friendly
11	11 September 2023	Tehelné pole, Bratislava, Slovakia	65	Liechtenstein	2–0	3–0	UEFA Euro 2024 qualifying
12	16 November 2023	Tehelné pole, Bratislava, Slovakia	68	Iceland	2–1	4–2	UEFA Euro 2024 qualifying
13	26 March 2024	Ullevaal Stadion, Oslo, Norway	71	Norway	1–1	1–1	Friendly
14	26 June 2024	Waldstadion, Frankfurt, Germany	75	Romania	1–0	1–1	UEFA Euro 2024
15	26 June 2024	Košická futbalová aréna, Košice, Slovakia	78	Azerbaijan	1–0	2–0	2024–25 UEFA Nations League
16	5 June 2026	Košická futbalová aréna, Košice, Slovakia	94	Montenegro	2–2	2–2	Friendly
17	26 September 2026	Tatran Stadium, Prešov, Slovakia	95	Moldova	2–0	2–0	2026–27 UEFA Nations League C

== Honours ==
Legia Warsaw

- Ekstraklasa: 2013–14, 2015–16
- Polish Cup: 2014–15, 2015–16
- Polish Super Cup runner-up: 2014, 2015, 2016

Slovakia

- King's Cup: 2018

Individual

- Peter Dubovský Award: 2014
- Serie A Goal of the Month: March 2025
