= Jonas Urbig =

German footballer (born 2003)

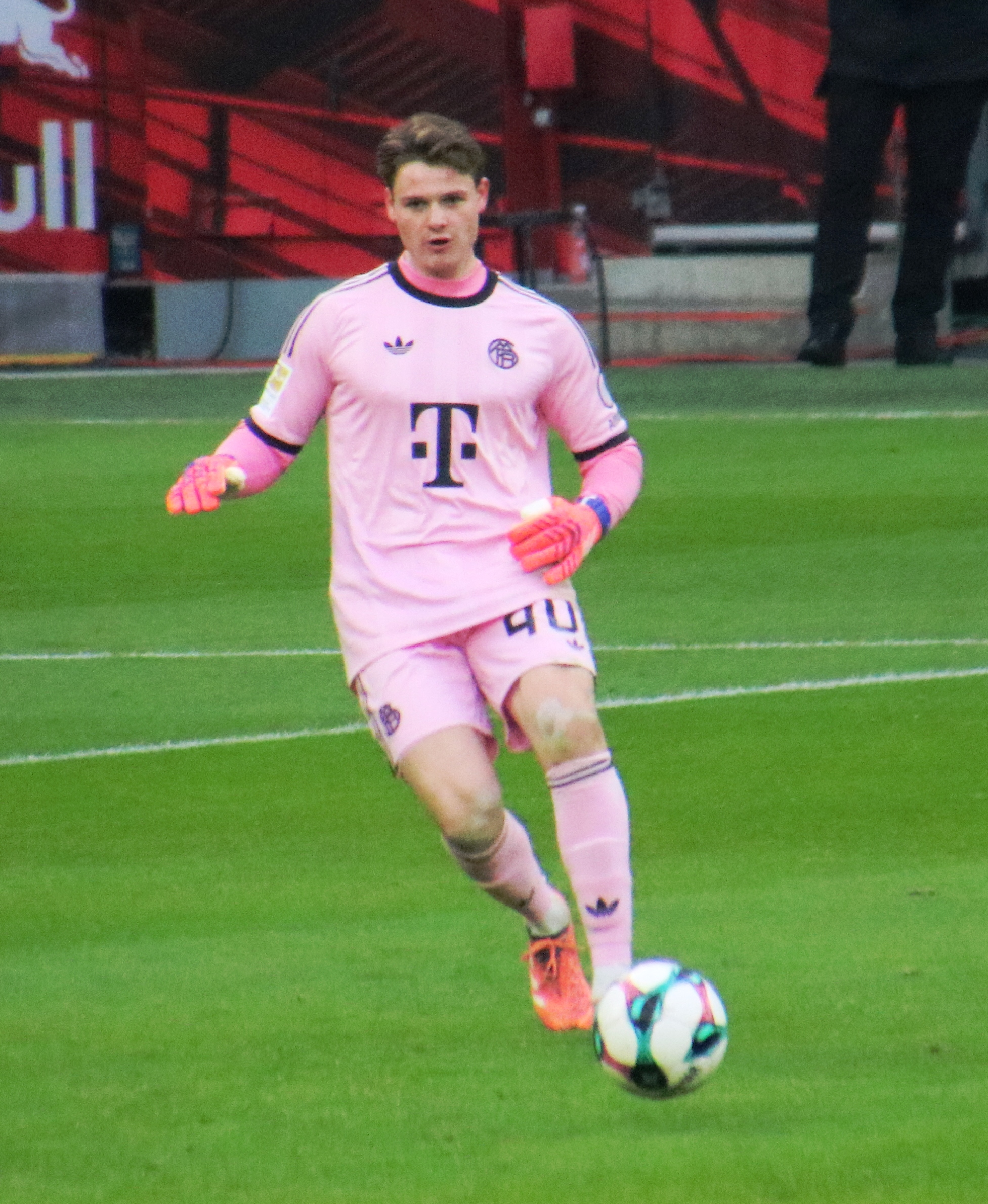
- Urbig playing for Bayern Munich in 2026

Personal information
- Full name: Jonas Kurt Urbig
- Date of birth: 8 August 2003 (age 23)
- Place of birth: Euskirchen, Germany
- Height: 1.89 m (6 ft 2 in)
- Position: Goalkeeper

Team information
- Current team: Bayern Munich
- Number: 40

Youth career
- 2012–2021: 1. FC Köln

Senior career*
Years	Team	Apps	(Gls)
2021–2022	1. FC Köln II	27	(0)
2023–2025	1. FC Köln	10	(0)
2023	→ Jahn Regensburg (loan)	17	(0)
2023–2024	→ Greuther Fürth (loan)	33	(0)
2025–	Bayern Munich	28	(0)

International career^{‡}
2019–2020	Germany U17	2	(0)
2020	Germany U18	1	(0)
2021–2022	Germany U19	9	(0)
2022–2023	Germany U20	2	(0)
2023–2025	Germany U21	8	(0)
2026–	Germany	2	(0)
- * Club domestic league appearances and goals as of 21:25, 20 November 2026 (UTC) ‡ National team caps and goals as of 23:45, 4 October 2026 (UTC)

Jonas Kurt Urbig (German pronunciation: [ˈjoːnas ˈʊʁbɪɡ]; born 8 August 2003) is a German professional footballer who plays as a goalkeeper for Bundesliga club Bayern Munich and the Germany national team.

== Early life ==
Urbig was born on 8 August 2003, in Euskirchen in the German state of North Rhine-Westphalia. His parents are Martina and Kurt Urbig, who played as a goalkeeper for the amateur football club TSC Euskirchen. His brothers are goalkeepers too, Henri plays for SV Schwarz-Weiß Nierfeld 1929 in the Kreisliga and Luis is Goalkeeper coach of FC Bayern Munich II.

== Club career ==
=== 1. FC Köln ===
Having attended a try-out at 1. FC Köln, he joined the club's youth academy in 2012. He went on to play for each of 1. FC Köln's youth teams.

==== Loan to Jahn Regensburg ====
In January 2023, Urbig joined 2. Bundesliga side Jahn Regensburg on a season-long loan. He made his professional debut during a 2–0 loss against Darmstadt 98 with a bad performance. Nevertheless he became the club's starting goalkeeper for the rest of the season. Urbig returned to his parent club at the end of the 2022–23 season after Jahn Regensburg failed to avoid relegation to 3. Liga.

==== Loan to Greuther Fürth ====
In July 2023, he extended his contract with 1. FC Köln until 2026, and joined 2. Bundesliga club Greuther Fürth on a season-long loan spell.

=== Bayern Munich ===
On 27 January 2025, Urbig signed a four-and-a-half-year contract with Bundesliga giants Bayern Munich. On 5 March, he was given his debut with the club in the UEFA Champions League round of 16, coming on in the 58th minute as a substitute for Manuel Neuer playing 32 minutes, and keeping a clean sheet during a 3–0 home victory over Bayer Leverkusen. Three days later, he made his Bundesliga debut during a 3–2 home loss to VfL Bochum, although he was praised for his performance. On 11 March, he had his first start in the UEFA Champions League, during a 2–0 away victory over Bayer Leverkusen in the round of 16 second leg and performed well.

In the following season, both Urbig and Neuer would share the goal, primarily due to Neuer's injuries. Urbig had played in all three competitions, Bundesliga, DFB-Pokal, and UEFA Champions League, because Manuel Neuer had several injuries at that time. On 10 March 2026, he suffered a concussion during the 6–1 away win against Italian Serie A club Atalanta, in the first leg of the 2025–26 UEFA Champions League round of 16. Urbig would return to the goal in the second leg however, which his side won 4–1 at home. Due to an injury from Neuer, Urbig would play the DFB-Pokal final, his first ever professional final, which his side won 3–0 against Stuttgart.

== International career ==
Urbig has represented Germany as a youth international starting with the country's under-17 team, and has featured for the under-18, under-19, under-20 and under-21 national teams.

On 19 March 2026, Urbig would receive his first senior Germany national team call-up by head coach Julian Nagelsmann for the pre-World Cup friendlies against Ghana and Switzerland. A week later, he left the national team as a precautionary measure due to a capsule injury to the right knee joint. Finn Dahmen, who was on standby, was called up to replace him. Despite not making it into the final 26-man squad for the 2026 FIFA World Cup, he would still travel with the national team to America as a training keeper.

On 1 October 2026, Urbig made his senior international debut in a 2026–27 UEFA Nations League A game against Serbia.

== Career statistics ==
As of match played 20 November 2026

Appearances and goals by club, season and competition
Club	Season	League			DFB-Pokal		Europe		Other		Total	
Club	Season	Division	Apps	Goals	Apps	Goals	Apps	Goals	Apps	Goals	Apps	Goals
1. FC Köln II	2020–21	Regionalliga West	0	0	—		—		—		0	0
1. FC Köln II	2021–22	Regionalliga West	14	0	—		—		—		14	0
1. FC Köln II	2022–23	Regionalliga West	13	0	—		—		—		13	0
1. FC Köln II	Total		27	0	—		—		—		27	0
1. FC Köln	2021–22	Bundesliga	0	0	0	0	—		—		0	0
1. FC Köln	2022–23	Bundesliga	0	0	0	0	0	0	—		0	0
1. FC Köln	2024–25	2. Bundesliga	10	0	1	0	—		—		11	0
1. FC Köln	Total		10	0	1	0	0	0	—		11	0
Jahn Regensburg (loan)	2022–23	2. Bundesliga	17	0	—		—		—		17	0
Jahn Regensburg (loan)	Total		17	0	—		—		—		17	0
Greuther Fürth (loan)	2023–24	2. Bundesliga	33	0	1	0	—		—		34	0
Greuther Fürth (loan)	Total		33	0	1	0	—		—		34	0
Bayern Munich	2024–25	Bundesliga	8	0	—		4 (Note: Appearances in UEFA Champions League)	0	0	0	12	0
Bayern Munich	2025–26	Bundesliga	14	0	3	0	3	0	0	0	20	0
Bayern Munich	2026–27	Bundesliga	6	0	2	0	1	0	0	0	9	0
Bayern Munich	Total		28	0	5	0	8	0	0	0	41	0
Career total			115	0	7	0	8	0	0	0	130	0

=== International ===
As of match played 4 October 2026

Appearances and goals by national team and year
National team	Year	Apps	Goals
Germany	2026	2	0
Total		2	0

== Honours ==
1. FC Köln

- 2. Bundesliga: 2024–25

Bayern Munich

- Bundesliga: 2024–25, 2025–26
- DFB-Pokal: 2025–26
- Franz Beckenbauer Supercup: 2025, 2026
