= Dejan Ljubičić =

Austrian footballer (born 1997)

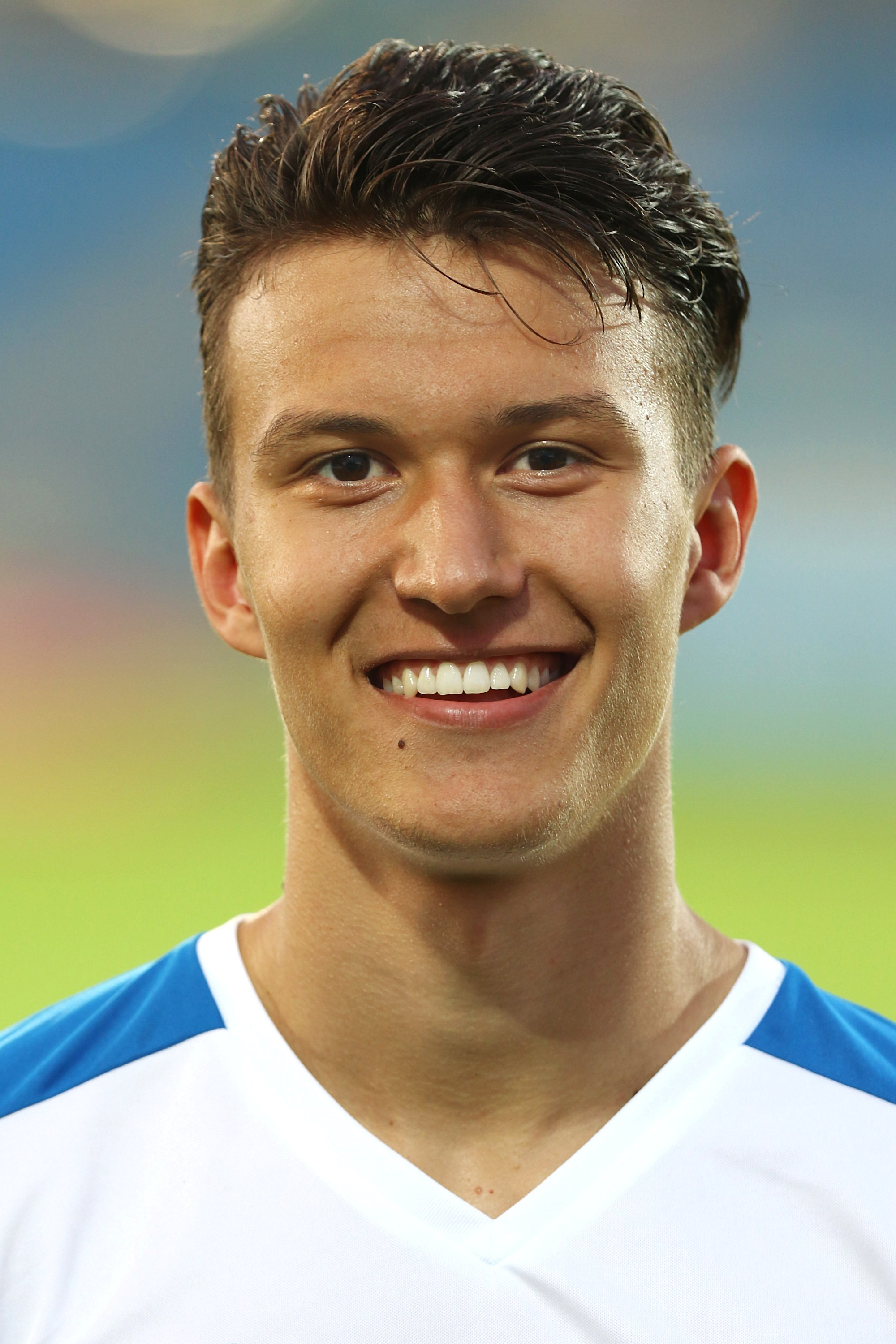
- Ljubičić with Wiener Neustadt in 2017

Personal information
- Date of birth: 8 October 1997 (age 29)
- Place of birth: Vienna, Austria
- Height: 1.87 m (6 ft 2 in)
- Position: Midfielder

Team information
- Current team: Schalke 04
- Number: 21

Youth career
- 2004–2006: Favoritner AC
- 2006–2015: Rapid Wien

Senior career*
Years	Team	Apps	(Gls)
2015–2017	Rapid Wien II	45	(3)
2017–2021	Rapid Wien	103	(6)
2017	→ Wiener Neustadt (loan)	7	(0)
2021–2025	1. FC Köln	110	(12)
2025–2026	Dinamo Zagreb	15	(0)
2026–	Schalke 04	20	(4)

International career
2021–	Austria	9	(1)
- * Club domestic league appearances and goals as of 17 November 2026

Dejan Ljubičić (born 8 October 1997) is an Austrian professional footballer who plays as a midfielder for Bundesliga club Schalke 04 and the Austria national team.

== Club career ==
Ljubičić joined the youth academy of Rapid Wien in 2006 after starting at Favoritner AC. He progressed through the club's youth ranks and made his debut for Rapid's reserve team in 2015. In 2017, he signed his first professional contract with Rapid and spent time on loan at Wiener Neustadt, where he made his professional debut. A proposed move to MLS club Chicago Fire collapsed during the 2019–20 winter transfer window after he was diagnosed with an anterior cruciate ligament injury. He later established himself in Rapid's first team, making 103 league appearances, scoring six goals, and captaining the club during the 2020–21 season.

In 2021, Ljubičić moved to Bundesliga club 1. FC Köln. His club suffered relegation in 2024, but helped the club secure immediate promotion back to the top flight in 2024–25 before departing upon the expiry of his contract. He then joined Dinamo Zagreb in June 2025, before transferring to FC Schalke 04 in January 2026, signing a contract until 2028.

== International career ==
Ljubičić was born in Austria to Bosnian Croat parents from Busovača. He debuted for the Austria national team in a 2–0 2022 FIFA World Cup qualification win over the Faroe Islands on 9 October 2021.

On 10 June 2026, he was added to Austria's squad for the 2026 FIFA World Cup as a replacement for the injured Christoph Baumgartner.

== Personal life ==
In August 2021, Ljubičić was sentenced for throwing bottles at a mosque in Kiseljak three years earlier. He had to pay a fine of 1,000 BAM or serve ten days in prison.

His younger brother Robert plays for AEK Athens.

== Career statistics ==
=== Club ===
As of match played 8 November 2026

Appearances and goals by club, season and competition
Club	Season	League			National cup (Note: Includes Austrian Cup, DFB-Pokal)		Europe		Total	
Club	Season	Division	Apps	Goals	Apps	Goals	Apps	Goals	Apps	Goals
Rapid Wien II	2015–16	Austrian Regionalliga East	20	0	—		—		20	0
Rapid Wien II	2016–17	Austrian Regionalliga East	25	3	—		—		25	3
Rapid Wien II	Total		45	3	—		—		45	3
Rapid Wien	2017–18	Austrian Bundesliga	28	3	4	0	—		32	3
Rapid Wien	2018–19	Austrian Bundesliga	29	1	4	0	12 (Note: Appearances in UEFA Europa League)	1	45	2
Rapid Wien	2019–20	Austrian Bundesliga	22	2	1	0	—		23	2
Rapid Wien	2020–21	Austrian Bundesliga	24	0	2	0	5 (Note: Two appearances in UEFA Champions League, three appearances in UEFA Europa League)	1	31	1
Rapid Wien	Total		103	6	11	0	17	2	131	8
Wiener Neustadt (loan)	2017–18	2. Liga	7	0	0	0	—		7	0
1. FC Köln	2021–22	Bundesliga	30	3	2	0	—		32	3
1. FC Köln	2022–23	Bundesliga	27	5	1	1	5 (Note: Appearances in UEFA Conference League)	2	33	8
1. FC Köln	2023–24	Bundesliga	26	0	1	0	—		27	0
1. FC Köln	2024–25	2. Bundesliga	27	4	3	1	—		30	5
1. FC Köln	Total		110	12	7	2	5	2	122	16
Dinamo Zagreb	2025–26	Croatian Football League	15	0	0	0	7	2	22	2
Schalke 04	2025–26	2. Bundesliga	15	4	—		—		15	4
Schalke 04	2026–27	Bundesliga	5	0	2	1	—		7	1
Schalke 04	Total		20	4	2	1	—		22	5
Career total			300	25	20	3	29	6	349	34

=== International ===
Appearances and goals by national team and year
National team	Year	Apps	Goals
Austria	2021	2	1
Austria	2022	2	0
Austria	2023	5	0
Total		9	1

Scores and results list Austria's goal tally first, score column indicates score after each Ljubičić goal.

List of international goals scored by Dejan Ljubičić
No.	Date	Venue	Opponent	Score	Result	Competition
1	15 November 2021	Wörthersee Stadion, Klagenfurt, Austria	Moldova	4–1	4–1	2022 FIFA World Cup qualification

== Honours ==
1. FC Köln

- 2. Bundesliga: 2024–25

Dinamo Zagreb

- Croatian Premier League: 2025–26

Schalke 04

- 2. Bundesliga: 2025–26
