= Timo Hübers =

German footballer (born 1996)

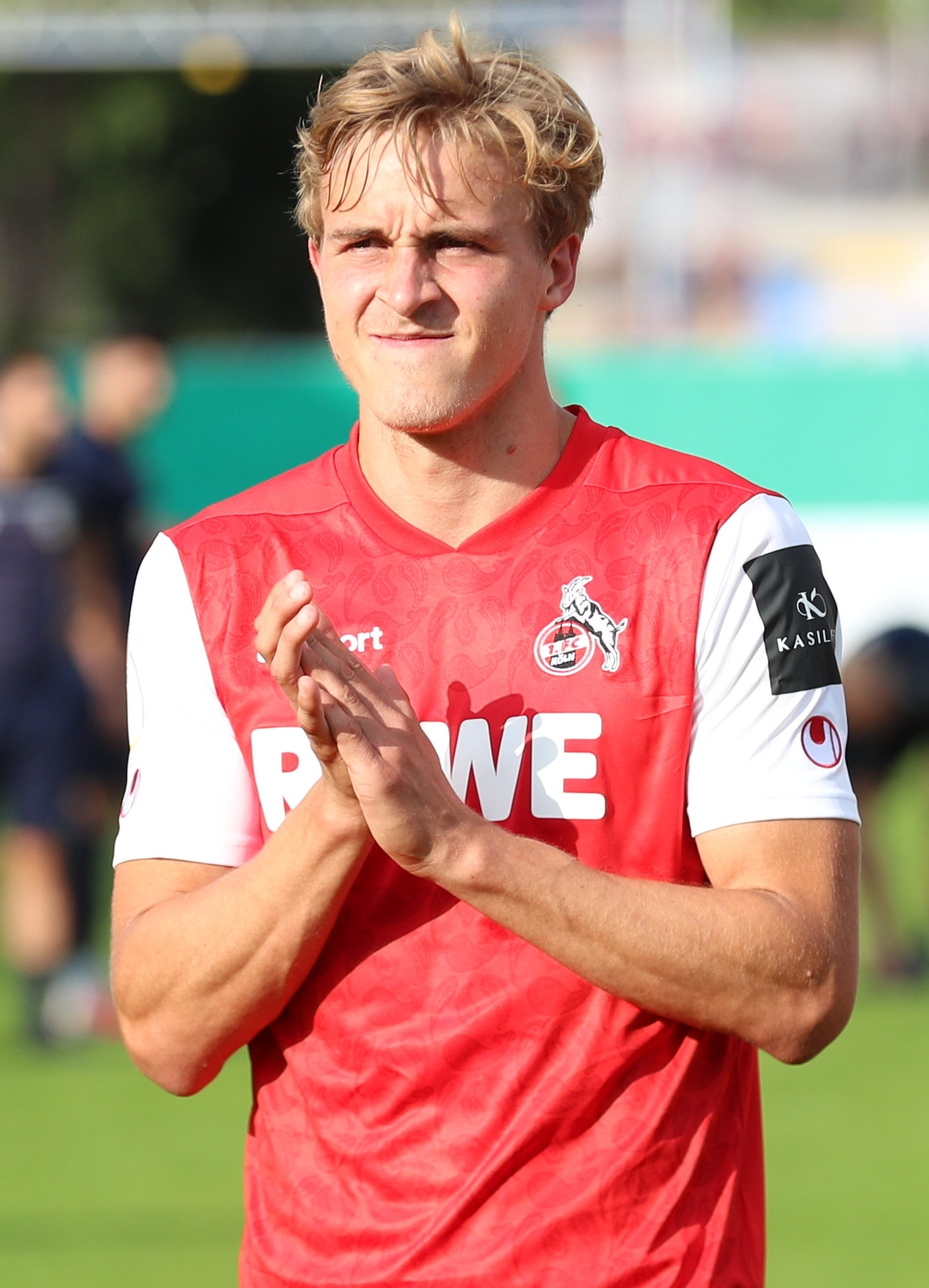
- Hübers in 2021

Personal information
- Full name: Timo Bernd Hübers
- Date of birth: 20 July 1996 (age 30)
- Place of birth: Hildesheim, Germany
- Height: 1.90 m (6 ft 3 in)
- Position: Centre-back

Team information
- Current team: 1. FC Köln
- Number: 4

Youth career
- –2008: Hildesia Diekholzen
- 2008–2015: Hannover 96

Senior career*
Years	Team	Apps	(Gls)
2015–2016	1. FC Köln II	22	(1)
2016–2021	Hannover 96 II	17	(1)
2016–2021	Hannover 96	37	(3)
2021–	1. FC Köln	117	(7)
- * Club domestic league appearances and goals as of 25 October 2025

Timo Bernd Hübers (born 20 July 1996) is a German professional footballer who plays as a defender for Bundesliga club 1. FC Köln.

== Career statistics ==
As of match played 25 October 2025.

Appearances and goals by club, season and competition
Club	Season	League			DFB-Pokal		Europe		Other		Total	
Club	Season	Division	Apps	Goals	Apps	Goals	Apps	Goals	Apps	Goals	Apps	Goals
1. FC Köln II	2015–16	Regionalliga West	21	1	—		—		—		21	1
1. FC Köln II	2021–22	Regionalliga West	1	0	—		—		—		1	0
1. FC Köln II	Total		22	1	—		—		—		22	1
Hannover 96 II	2016–17	Regionalliga Nord	2	0	—		—		—		2	0
Hannover 96 II	2017–18	Regionalliga Nord	15	1	—		—		—		15	1
Hannover 96 II	Total		17	1	—		—		—		17	1
Hannover 96	2017–18	Bundesliga	5	0	0	0	—		—		5	0
Hannover 96	2019–20	2. Bundesliga	12	1	0	0	—		—		12	1
Hannover 96	2020–21	2. Bundesliga	20	2	2	1	—		—		22	3
Hannover 96	Total		37	3	2	1	—		—		39	4
1. FC Köln	2021–22	Bundesliga	20	1	3	0	—		—		23	1
1. FC Köln	2022–23	Bundesliga	29	3	1	0	7 (Note: Appearances in UEFA Europa Conference League)	1	—		37	4
1. FC Köln	2023–24	Bundesliga	31	0	2	0	—		—		33	0
1. FC Köln	2024–25	2. Bundesliga	29	3	4	0	—		—		33	3
1. FC Köln	2025–26	Bundesliga	8	0	1	0	—		—		9	0
1. FC Köln	Total		117	7	11	0	7	1	—		135	8
Career total			193	12	13	1	7	1	0	0	213	14

== Honours ==
1.FC Koln

- 2.Bundesliga: 2024–25
