= Marvin Obuz =

German association football player

Personal information
- Full name: Marvin Ayhan Obuz
- Date of birth: 15 January 2002 (age 24)
- Place of birth: Cologne, Germany
- Height: 1.82 m (6 ft 0 in)
- Position: Winger

Team information
- Current team: Rot-Weiss Essen
- Number: 10

Youth career
- –2009: BC Efferen
- 2009–2020: 1. FC Köln

Senior career*
Years	Team	Apps	(Gls)
2020–2025	1. FC Köln II	50	(16)
2021–2025	1. FC Köln	5	(0)
2022–2023	→ Holstein Kiel (loan)	10	(0)
2022–2023	→ Holstein Kiel II (loan)	13	(4)
2023–2024	→ Rot-Weiss Essen (loan)	34	(7)
2025–	Rot-Weiss Essen	37	(2)

International career^{‡}
2017–2018	Germany U16	11	(2)
2019	Germany U17	5	(1)
2020	Germany U19	1	(0)
2021–2022	Germany U20	9	(0)
- * Club domestic league appearances and goals as of 20 May 2026 ‡ National team caps and goals as of 22 November 2022

Marvin Ayhan Obuz (born 25 January 2002) is a German professional footballer who plays as a winger for 3. Liga club Rot-Weiss Essen. He made his professional debut for 1. FC Köln in October 2021.

== Club career ==
Obuz began his youth career at BC Efferen a non-league club in Hürth. In 2009, he joined the youth academy of 1. FC Köln. Having progressed through Köln's youth sides, he was promoted to 1. FC Köln II, the clubs's reserve squad at the start of the 2020–21 season. In January 2021, Obuz was introduced to his club's first squad under manager Markus Gisdol.

On 27 October 2021, Obuz made his professional debut in a DFB Pokal match against VfB Stuttgart. In July 2022, he joined Holstein Kiel on a one-year loan spell. After the conclusion of his contract with Kiel, Obuz was transferred to 3. Liga club Rot-Weiss Essen on another one-year loan.

On 23 June 2025, Obuz returned to Rot-Weiss Essen in 3. Liga.

== International career ==
Born in Germany, Obuz is of Turkish descent. He has represented Germany as a youth international.

== Honours ==
1.FC Koln

- 2.Bundesliga: 2024–25
