= Kingsley Schindler =

Ghanaian footballer (born 1993)

Personal information
- Date of birth: 12 July 1993 (age 33)
- Place of birth: Hamburg, Germany
- Height: 1.83 m (6 ft 0 in)
- Position: Midfielder

Team information
- Current team: Buriram United
- Number: 19

Youth career
- –2011: SC Concordia
- 2011–2012: Hannover 96

Senior career*
Years	Team	Apps	(Gls)
2011	SC Concordia	1	(0)
2012–2013	TSG Neustrelitz	20	(2)
2013–2016	1899 Hoffenheim II	77	(14)
2016–2019	Holstein Kiel	91	(30)
2019–2023	1. FC Köln	60	(1)
2020–2021	→ Hannover 96 (loan)	25	(0)
2023–2025	Samsunspor	52	(3)
2025–	Buriram United	0	(0)

International career^{‡}
2023–	Ghana	8	(0)
- * Club domestic league appearances and goals as of 16 June 2025 ‡ National team caps and goals as of 10:54, 18 April 2025 (UTC)

Kingsley Schindler (born 12 July 1993) is a professional footballer who plays as a midfielder for Thai League 1 club Buriram United. Born in Germany, he plays for the Ghana national team.

== Career ==
Schindler spent his youth career at SC Concordia, Hannover 96 and TSG Neustrelitz. In 2013, he transferred to 1899 Hoffenheim II, where he competed in the Regionalliga Südwest. From 2016, he played for Holstein Kiel. The club achieved promotion to the 2. Bundesliga in 2017, leading to Schindler's breakthrough as a professional footballer.

In January 2019, it was announced that Schindler would leave Kiel after the season and sign a contract until 2023 with 1. FC Köln who achieved promotion to the Bundesliga later that season.

In August 2020, Schindler was loaned to Hannover 96 for one year.

On 26 July 2023, Schindler signed a two-year contract, with an optional third year, with Samsunspor in Turkey.

== Personal life ==
Born in Germany, Schindler is of Ghanaian descent. He was called up to play for the Ghana national team for a set of 2023 Africa Cup of Nations qualification matches in March 2023.
