= Luca Kilian =

German footballer

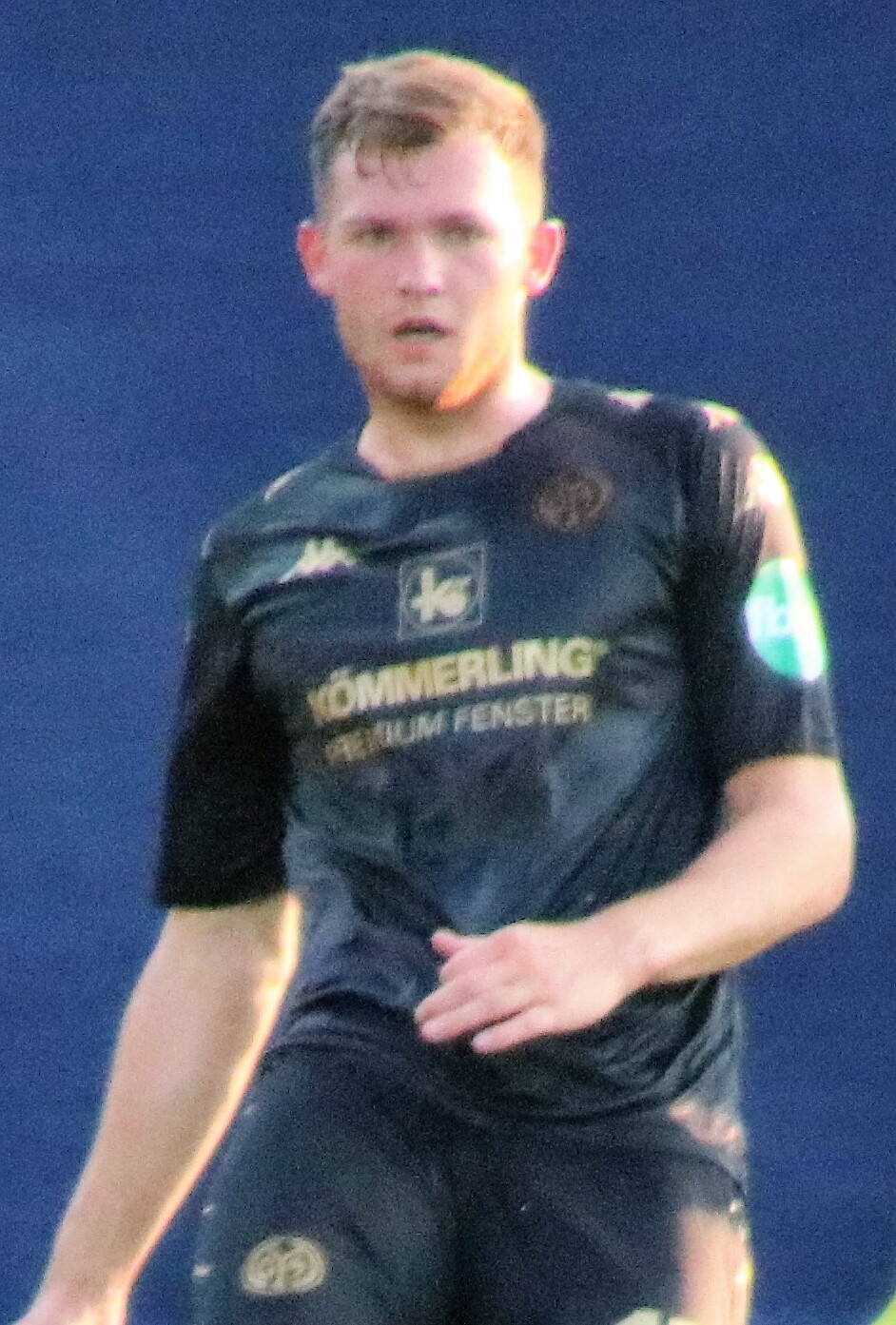
- Kilian playing for Mainz 05 in 2021.

Personal information
- Full name: Luca Jannis Kilian
- Date of birth: 1 September 1999 (age 27)
- Place of birth: Dortmund, Germany
- Height: 1.92 m (6 ft 4 in)
- Position: Defender

Youth career
- 2004–2011: Hombruch
- 2011–2018: Borussia Dortmund

Senior career*
Years	Team	Apps	(Gls)
2018–2019	Borussia Dortmund II	28	(4)
2019–2020	SC Paderborn	15	(0)
2020–2022	Mainz 05	8	(0)
2021–2022	→ 1. FC Köln (loan)	30	(1)
2022–2026	1. FC Köln	29	(1)

International career^{‡}
2016–2017	Germany U18	4	(0)
2017–2018	Germany U19	4	(0)
2019	Germany U20	2	(0)
2019–2020	Germany U21	7	(1)
- * Club domestic league appearances and goals as of 15 May 2026 ‡ National team caps and goals as of 9 October 2020

Luca Jannis Kilian (born 1 September 1999) is a German professional footballer who plays as a defender.

== Club career ==
Kilian joined the youth academy of Borussia Dortmund at the age of 11 from his local club Hombruch. On 24 May 2019, he signed a professional contract with SC Paderborn 07. He made his professional debut with Paderbon in a 3–2 Bundesliga loss to FC Bayern Munich on 28 September 2019.

On 10 August 2020, Kilian signed for Bundesliga club Mainz 05, on a four-year deal. On 24 August 2021, it was announced that Kilian would join 1. FC Köln on a one-year loan. He joined the club on a permanent basis for a fee of €2 Million in July 2022. He signed a contract until 2025.

== Personal life ==
Kilian is the grandson of the German former footballer Amand Theis. On 13 March 2020, Kilian tested positive for coronavirus.

== Honours ==
1.FC Koln

- 2.Bundesliga: 2024–25
