= List of German football transfers winter 2024–25 =

This is a list of German football transfers in the winter transfer window 2024–25 by club. Only transfers of the Bundesliga and 2. Bundesliga are included.

== Bundesliga ==
Note: Flags indicate national team as has been defined under FIFA eligibility rules. Players may hold more than one non-FIFA nationality.

=== Bayer Leverkusen ===
In:

No.	Pos.	Nation	Player
5	DF	ESP	Mario Hermoso (on loan from Roma)
16	MF	ARG	Emiliano Buendía (on loan from Aston Villa)
18	FW	ARG	Alejo Sarco (from Vélez Sarsfield)

Out:

No.	Pos.	Nation	Player
39	DF	TOG	Sadik Fofana (to Grazer AK)
—	MF	BEL	Noah Mbamba (on loan to Dender, previously on loan at Fortuna Düsseldorf)
—	MF	MNE	Matija Marsenić (to Górnik Zabrze)

=== VfB Stuttgart ===
In:

No.	Pos.	Nation	Player
14	DF	SUI	Luca Jaquez (from Luzern)
25	FW	DEN	Jacob Bruun Larsen (from TSG Hoffenheim)
29	DF	GER	Finn Jeltsch (from 1. FC Nürnberg)

Out:

No.	Pos.	Nation	Player
13	DF	GER	Frans Krätzig (loan return to Bayern Munich)
29	DF	FRA	Anthony Rouault (to Rennes)
—	FW	SRB	Jovan Milošević (on loan to Partizan, previously on loan at St. Gallen)

=== Bayern Munich ===
In:

No.	Pos.	Nation	Player
40	GK	GER	Jonas Urbig (from 1. FC Köln)

Out:

No.	Pos.	Nation	Player
20	FW	GER	Arijon Ibrahimović (on loan to Lazio)
39	FW	FRA	Mathys Tel (on loan to Tottenham Hotspur)
49	DF	MAR	Adam Aznou (on loan to Valladolid)
—	DF	GER	Frans Krätzig (on loan to 1. FC Heidenheim, previously on loan at VfB Stuttgart)

=== RB Leipzig ===
In:

No.	Pos.	Nation	Player
10	MF	NED	Xavi Simons (from Paris Saint-Germain, previously on loan)
17	DF	GER	Ridle Baku (from VfL Wolfsburg)
21	DF	SRB	Kosta Nedeljković (on loan from Aston Villa)
27	FW	FRA	Tidiam Gomis (from Caen)

Out:

No.	Pos.	Nation	Player
6	MF	MKD	Eljif Elmas (on loan to Torino)
19	FW	POR	André Silva (on loan to Werder Bremen)
—	FW	CZE	Yannick Eduardo (on loan to Emmen, previously on loan at De Graafschap)

=== Borussia Dortmund ===
In:

No.	Pos.	Nation	Player
17	MF	ENG	Carney Chukwuemeka (on loan from Chelsea)
24	DF	SWE	Daniel Svensson (on loan from Nordsjælland)
—	GK	GER	Diant Ramaj (from Ajax)

Out:

No.	Pos.	Nation	Player
21	FW	NED	Donyell Malen (to Aston Villa)
—	GK	GER	Diant Ramaj (on loan to Copenhagen)
—	FW	CIV	Sébastien Haller (on loan to Utrecht, previously on loan at Leganés)

=== Eintracht Frankfurt ===
In:

No.	Pos.	Nation	Player
3	DF	BEL	Arthur Theate (from Rennes, previously on loan)
17	FW	FRA	Elye Wahi (from Marseille)
30	FW	BEL	Michy Batshuayi (from Galatasaray)

Out:

No.	Pos.	Nation	Player
7	FW	EGY	Omar Marmoush (to Manchester City)
—	GK	ALB	Simon Simoni (on loan to 1. FC Kaiserslautern, previously on loan at FC Ingolstadt)
—	FW	NOR	Jens Petter Hauge (to Bodø/Glimt, previously on loan)
—	FW	GER	Faride Alidou (to 1. FC Kaiserslautern, previously on loan at Hellas Verona)

=== TSG Hoffenheim ===
In:

No.	Pos.	Nation	Player
4	DF	NOR	Leo Østigård (on loan from Rennes)
14	FW	NGA	Gift Orban (from Lyon)
29	FW	CIV	Bazoumana Touré (from Hammarby)
32	GK	DEN	Jakob Busk (on loan from Sønderjyske)

Out:

No.	Pos.	Nation	Player
4	DF	GER	Tim Drexler (on loan to 1. FC Nürnberg)
10	FW	GER	Mërgim Berisha (on loan to FC Augsburg)
11	MF	AUT	Florian Grillitsch (on loan to Valladolid)
24	MF	GER	Marco John (to Greuther Fürth)
29	FW	DEN	Jacob Bruun Larsen (to VfB Stuttgart)
41	DF	HUN	Attila Szalai (on loan to Standard Liège)
—	DF	GER	Joshua Quarshie (on loan to Greuther Fürth, previously on loan at Fortuna Düsseldorf)

=== 1. FC Heidenheim ===
In:

No.	Pos.	Nation	Player
12	FW	GEO	Budu Zivzivadze (from Karlsruher SC)
13	DF	GER	Frans Krätzig (on loan from Bayern Munich, previously on loan at VfB Stuttgart)

Out:

No.	Pos.	Nation	Player
11	MF	GER	Denis Thomalla (to AEL Limassol)
29	FW	DEN	Mikkel Kaufmann (on loan to Karlsruher SC)
33	MF	USA	Lennard Maloney (to Mainz 05)

=== Werder Bremen ===
In:

No.	Pos.	Nation	Player
9	FW	POR	André Silva (on loan from RB Leipzig)
29	DF	BFA	Issa Kaboré (on loan from Manchester City, previously on loan at Benfica)

Out:

No.	Pos.	Nation	Player
2	DF	BEL	Olivier Deman (on loan to Royal Antwerp)
18	MF	GUI	Naby Keïta (on loan to Ferencváros)
21	MF	NOR	Isak Hansen-Aarøen (on loan to AaB)

=== SC Freiburg ===
In:

No.	Pos.	Nation	Player
16	DF	GER	Jan-Niklas Beste (from Benfica)

Out:

No.	Pos.	Nation	Player
4	DF	GER	Kenneth Schmidt (on loan to Hannover 96)
7	MF	GER	Noah Weißhaupt (on loan to FC St. Pauli)

=== FC Augsburg ===
In:

No.	Pos.	Nation	Player
16	DF	SUI	Cédric Zesiger (on loan from VfL Wolfsburg)
37	FW	GER	Mërgim Berisha (on loan from TSG Hoffenheim)

Out:

No.	Pos.	Nation	Player
14	MF	JPN	Masaya Okugawa (to Kyoto Sanga)
16	MF	SUI	Rubén Vargas (to Sevilla)
18	MF	GER	Tim Breithaupt (on loan to 1. FC Kaiserslautern)
23	DF	GER	Maximilian Bauer (on loan to 1. FC Kaiserslautern)
—	DF	GER	Patric Pfeiffer (on loan to 1. FC Magdeburg, previously on loan at Young Boys)
—	FW	FRA	Irvin Cardona (on loan to Saint-Étienne, previously on loan at Espanyol)

=== VfL Wolfsburg ===
In:

No.	Pos.	Nation	Player
5	DF	DEN	Mads Roerslev (on loan from Brentford)
7	FW	DEN	Andreas Skov Olsen (from Club Brugge)

Out:

No.	Pos.	Nation	Player
5	DF	SUI	Cédric Zesiger (on loan to FC Augsburg)
8	MF	TUR	Salih Özcan (loan return to Borussia Dortmund)
20	DF	GER	Ridle Baku (to RB Leipzig)
—	MF	POL	Eryk Grzywacz (on loan to 1. FC Nürnberg)
—	MF	CRO	Bartol Franjić (on loan to Dinamo Zagreb, previously on loan at Shakhtar Donetsk)

=== Mainz 05 ===
In:

No.	Pos.	Nation	Player
9	FW	FRA	Arnaud Nordin (from Montpellier)
15	MF	USA	Lennard Maloney (from 1. FC Heidenheim)

Out:

No.	Pos.	Nation	Player
4	MF	MAR	Aymen Barkok (to Schalke 04)
9	FW	AUT	Karim Onisiwo (to Red Bull Salzburg)
17	MF	CRO	Gabriel Vidović (loan return to Bayern Munich)
—	MF	GER	Tom Krauß (on loan to VfL Bochum, previously on loan at Luton Town)

=== Borussia Mönchengladbach ===
In:

No.	Pos.	Nation	Player

Out:

No.	Pos.	Nation	Player
28	FW	GER	Grant-Leon Ranos (on loan to 1. FC Kaiserslautern)
41	GK	GER	Jan Olschowsky (on loan to Alemannia Aachen)

=== Union Berlin ===
In:

No.	Pos.	Nation	Player
27	FW	CRO	Marin Ljubičić (from LASK)

Out:

No.	Pos.	Nation	Player
7	FW	BEL	Yorbe Vertessen (to Red Bull Salzburg)
17	FW	USA	Jordan Pefok (to Reims)
39	GK	GER	Yannic Stein (on loan to Babelsberg 03)
—	GK	GER	Lennart Grill (on loan to Greuther Fürth, previously on loan at Eintracht Braunschweig)
—	FW	CIV	Chris Bedia (on loan to Young Boys, previously on loan at Hull City)

=== VfL Bochum ===
In:

No.	Pos.	Nation	Player
11	MF	GRE	Georgios Masouras (on loan from Olympiacos)
17	MF	GER	Tom Krauß (on loan from Mainz 05, previously on loan at Luton Town)

Out:

No.	Pos.	Nation	Player
7	MF	GER	Lukas Daschner (on loan to FC St. Gallen)
11	MF	GER	Moritz Kwarteng (on loan to Fortuna Düsseldorf)
17	MF	MKD	Agon Elezi (on loan to Gorica)
22	FW	GUI	Aliou Baldé (loan return to Nice)
31	GK	GER	Manuel Riemann (to SC Paderborn)
41	DF	SUI	Noah Loosli (on loan to Greuther Fürth)

=== FC St. Pauli ===
In:

No.	Pos.	Nation	Player
6	MF	USA	James Sands (on loan from New York City)
9	FW	GAM	Abdoulie Ceesay (from Paide)
13	MF	GER	Noah Weißhaupt (on loan from SC Freiburg)
32	GK	GER	Eric Oelschlägel (free agent)
44	DF	BEL	Siebe Van der Heyden (on loan from Mallorca)

Out:

No.	Pos.	Nation	Player
33	FW	BRA	Maurides (on loan to Debrecen)

=== Holstein Kiel ===
In:

No.	Pos.	Nation	Player
13	DF	CRO	Ivan Nekić (from Varaždin)
26	DF	SVN	David Zec (from Celje)
47	DF	USA	John Tolkin (from New York Red Bulls)

Out:

No.	Pos.	Nation	Player
27	DF	POL	Tymoteusz Puchacz (on loan to Plymouth Argyle)

== 2. Bundesliga ==
Note: Flags indicate national team as has been defined under FIFA eligibility rules. Players may hold more than one non-FIFA nationality.

=== 1. FC Köln ===
In:

No.	Pos.	Nation	Player
2	DF	SUI	Joël Schmied (from Sion)
25	DF	BIH	Jusuf Gazibegović (from Sturm Graz)
26	GK	SUI	Anthony Racioppi (on loan from Hull City)
27	FW	BIH	Imad Rondić (from Widzew Łódź)

Out:

No.	Pos.	Nation	Player
5	DF	CRO	Nikola Soldo (free agent)
18	DF	DEN	Rasmus Carstensen (on loan to Lech Poznań)
23	FW	ARM	Sargis Adamyan (on loan to Jahn Regensburg)
33	FW	GER	Florian Dietz (on loan to SCR Altach)
36	MF	GER	Meiko Wäschenbach (to Karlsruher SC)
38	DF	GER	Elias Bakatukanda (on loan to Blau-Weiß Linz)
39	FW	GER	Maximilian Schmid (to Erzgebirge Aue)
40	GK	GER	Jonas Urbig (to Bayern Munich)

=== Darmstadt 98 ===
In:

No.	Pos.	Nation	Player
10	MF	SUR	Jean-Paul Boëtius (free agent)
14	DF	MNE	Meldin Drešković (from Debrecen)

Out:

No.	Pos.	Nation	Player
22	GK	POL	Karol Niemczycki (on loan to Ashdod)
23	MF	ALB	Klaus Gjasula (to Rot-Weiss Essen)
42	FW	GER	Fabio Torsiello (on loan to SpVgg Unterhaching)

=== Fortuna Düsseldorf ===
In:

No.	Pos.	Nation	Player
5	DF	GER	Moritz Heyer (from Hamburger SV)
11	MF	GER	Moritz Kwarteng (on loan from VfL Bochum)

Out:

No.	Pos.	Nation	Player
5	DF	GER	Joshua Quarshie (loan return to TSG Hoffenheim)
11	MF	GER	Felix Klaus (to Greuther Fürth)
30	DF	NED	Jordy de Wijs (on loan to Heerenveen)
39	MF	BEL	Noah Mbamba (loan return to Bayer Leverkusen)
46	MF	GER	Sima Suso (on loan to Hansa Rostock)

=== Hamburger SV ===
In:

No.	Pos.	Nation	Player
16	FW	SCO	Adedire Mebude (on loan from Westerlo)
22	DF	FRA	Aboubaka Soumahoro (from Paris FC)
38	FW	NOR	Alexander Røssing-Lelesiit (from Lillestrøm)

Out:

No.	Pos.	Nation	Player
3	DF	GER	Moritz Heyer (to Fortuna Düsseldorf)
24	DF	FRA	Lucas Perrin (on loan to Cercle Brugge)
36	MF	FIN	Anssi Suhonen (on loan to Jahn Regensburg)
—	FW	GER	Tom Sanne (on loan to Dordrecht, previously on loan at Hannover 96 II)

=== Karlsruher SC ===
In:

No.	Pos.	Nation	Player
14	FW	DEN	Mikkel Kaufmann (on loan from 1. FC Heidenheim)
21	MF	GER	Meiko Wäschenbach (from 1. FC Köln)
33	GK	KOS	Mustafë Abdullahu (on loan from Tirana, previously on loan at Malisheva)

Out:

No.	Pos.	Nation	Player
8	MF	SUI	Noah Rupp (on loan to Stade Lausanne Ouchy)
11	FW	GEO	Budu Zivzivadze (to 1. FC Heidenheim)

=== Hannover 96 ===
In:

No.	Pos.	Nation	Player
3	DF	GER	Boris Tomiak (from 1. FC Kaiserslautern)
4	DF	GER	Kenneth Schmidt (on loan from SC Freiburg)
15	MF	GER	Noël Aséko Nkili (on loan from Bayern Munich II)
40	FW	WAL	Rabbi Matondo (on loan from Rangers)

Out:

No.	Pos.	Nation	Player

=== SC Paderborn ===
In:

No.	Pos.	Nation	Player
1	GK	GER	Manuel Riemann (from VfL Bochum)
6	MF	GER	Marvin Mehlem (on loan from Hull City)
24	FW	FIN	Casper Terho (on loan from Union SG)

Out:

No.	Pos.	Nation	Player
1	GK	NED	Pelle Boevink (to FC Ingolstadt)
8	MF	GER	David Kinsombi (on loan to Preußen Münster)
9	FW	GER	Mika Baur (on loan to Dynamo Dresden)
10	FW	NED	Koen Kostons (on loan to Kortrijk)
16	DF	MKD	Visar Musliu (to Sint-Truiden)

=== Greuther Fürth ===
In:

No.	Pos.	Nation	Player
15	DF	GER	Joshua Quarshie (on loan from TSG Hoffenheim, previously on loan at Fortuna Düsseldorf)
24	MF	GER	Marco John (from TSG Hoffenheim)
30	MF	GER	Felix Klaus (from Fortuna Düsseldorf)
25	DF	SUI	Noah Loosli (on loan from VfL Bochum)
28	FW	GER	Jannik Mause (on loan from 1. FC Kaiserslautern)
31	GK	GER	Lennart Grill (on loan from Union Berlin, previously on loan at Eintracht Braunschweig)

Out:

No.	Pos.	Nation	Player
3	DF	MAR	Oualid Mhamdi (to SC Verl)
4	DF	POL	Damian Michalski (to Zagłębie Lubin)
8	FW	AUT	Marlon Mustapha (loan return to Como)
19	DF	GER	Matti Wagner (on loan to Rot-Weiss Essen)
20	MF	GER	Leander Popp (on loan to SpVgg Unterhaching)

=== Hertha BSC ===
In:

No.	Pos.	Nation	Player

Out:

No.	Pos.	Nation	Player
26	FW	DEN	Gustav Christensen (on loan to FC Ingolstadt)
—	FW	CIV	Wilfried Kanga (to Dinamo Zagreb, previously on loan at Cardiff City)

=== Schalke 04 ===
In:

No.	Pos.	Nation	Player
10	FW	SEN	Pape Meïssa Ba (from Grenoble)
25	MF	MAR	Aymen Barkok (from Mainz 05)
27	GK	GER	Loris Karius (free agent)

Out:

No.	Pos.	Nation	Player
1	GK	GER	Ron-Thorben Hoffmann (on loan to Eintracht Braunschweig)
4	DF	CMR	Steve Noode (on loan to SCR Altach)
11	FW	FRA	Bryan Lasme (on loan to Grasshoppers)
21	DF	BEL	Martin Wasinski (on loan to Jong Genk)
27	MF	GER	Lino Tempelmann (on loan to Eintracht Braunschweig)
—	FW	GER	Paul Pöpperl (on loan to Viktoria Köln, previously on loan at VVV-Venlo)

=== SV Elversberg ===
In:

No.	Pos.	Nation	Player
22	FW	GER	Younes Ebnoutalib (from FC Gießen)

Out:

No.	Pos.	Nation	Player
18	FW	GER	Mohammad Mahmoud (on loan to Zürich U21)

=== 1. FC Nürnberg ===
In:

No.	Pos.	Nation	Player
4	DF	GER	Fabio Gruber (from SC Verl)
5	DF	GER	Tim Drexler (on loan from TSG Hoffenheim)
9	FW	GER	Stefanos Tzimas (from PAOK, previously on loan)
9	FW	GER	Stefanos Tzimas (on loan from Brighton & Hove Albion)
19	MF	POL	Eryk Grzywacz (on loan from VfL Wolfsburg)
28	FW	FRA	Janis Antiste (on loan from Sassuolo)

Out:

No.	Pos.	Nation	Player
4	DF	GER	Finn Jeltsch (to VfB Stuttgart)
7	MF	GER	Florian Pick (to Preußen Münster)
8	MF	GER	Taylan Duman (to SV Sandhausen)
9	FW	GER	Stefanos Tzimas (to Brighton & Hove Albion)
11	MF	JPN	Kanji Okunuki (to Gamba Osaka)
19	MF	CZE	Michal Ševčík (loan return to Sparta Prague)
29	DF	GER	Tim Handwerker (to Jahn Regensburg)
43	DF	GER	Jannik Hofmann (on loan to VfB Stuttgart II)
—	FW	ENG	Joseph Hungbo (to Wigan Athletic, previously on loan at Rotherham United)

=== 1. FC Kaiserslautern ===
In:

No.	Pos.	Nation	Player
5	DF	GER	Maximilian Bauer (on loan from FC Augsburg)
16	MF	GER	Tim Breithaupt (on loan from FC Augsburg)
25	GK	ALB	Simon Simoni (on loan from Eintracht Frankfurt, previously on loan at FC Ingolstadt)
42	FW	GER	Grant-Leon Ranos (on loan from Borussia Mönchengladbach)
48	FW	GER	Faride Alidou (from Eintracht Frankfurt, previously on loan at Hellas Verona)

Out:

No.	Pos.	Nation	Player
2	DF	GER	Boris Tomiak (to Hannover 96)
18	FW	GER	Jannik Mause (on loan to Greuther Fürth)
29	FW	GER	Richmond Tachie (on loan to Eintracht Braunschweig)
40	FW	NGA	Dickson Abiama (on loan to 1860 Munich)

=== 1. FC Magdeburg ===
In:

No.	Pos.	Nation	Player
3	DF	GER	Patric Pfeiffer (on loan from FC Augsburg, previously on loan at Young Boys)
6	MF	POL	Dariusz Stalmach (from Milan Futuro)
12	FW	SWE	Alexander Ahl Holmström (from GAIS)

Out:

No.	Pos.	Nation	Player
3	DF	KOS	Andi Hoti (on loan to Dynamo Dresden)
26	FW	MNE	Aleksa Marušić (on loan to Sheriff Tiraspol)
31	MF	GER	Robert Leipertz (on loan to SSV Ulm)
37	FW	JPN	Tatsuya Ito (to Kawasaki Frontale)

=== Eintracht Braunschweig ===
In:

No.	Pos.	Nation	Player
1	GK	GER	Ron-Thorben Hoffmann (on loan from Schalke 04)
2	DF	TUN	Mohamed Dräger (from Basel)
16	MF	NED	Julian Baas (on loan from Sparta Rotterdam)
20	MF	GER	Lino Tempelmann (on loan from Schalke 04)
29	FW	GER	Richmond Tachie (on loan from 1. FC Kaiserslautern)

Out:

No.	Pos.	Nation	Player
1	GK	GER	Lennart Grill (loan return to Union Berlin)
23	DF	ANG	Anderson Lucoqui (to 1860 Munich)
29	MF	GER	Karim Hüneburg (on loan to Weiche Flensburg)

=== SSV Ulm ===
In:

No.	Pos.	Nation	Player
13	MF	GER	Robert Leipertz (on loan from 1. FC Magdeburg)
14	MF	GER	Dennis Dressel (from Grazer AK)
21	MF	GER	Oliver Batista Meier (from Dynamo Dresden)

Out:

No.	Pos.	Nation	Player
8	MF	GER	Lukas Ahrend (free agent)
13	FW	CAN	Jayden Nelson (loan return to Rosenborg)
17	DF	GER	Niklas Kölle (on loan to VfL Osnabrück)
20	MF	GER	Laurin Ulrich (loan return to VfB Stuttgart)
26	MF	GER	Philipp Maier (to 1860 Munich)
35	MF	GER	Julian Kudala (on loan to Schweinfurt 05)
44	FW	GER	Niklas Castelle (on loan to Alemannia Aachen)

=== Preußen Münster ===
In:

No.	Pos.	Nation	Player
4	MF	GER	David Kinsombi (on loan from SC Paderborn)
13	MF	GER	Florian Pick (from 1. FC Nürnberg)

Out:

No.	Pos.	Nation	Player
6	MF	NED	Thomas Kok (to Sportfreunde Lotte)
9	FW	GER	Joel Grodowski (to Arminia Bielefeld)
39	MF	GER	Jakob Korte (on loan to VfB Lübeck)

=== Jahn Regensburg ===
In:

No.	Pos.	Nation	Player
2	DF	GER	Tim Handwerker (from 1. FC Nürnberg)
22	FW	ARM	Sargis Adamyan (on loan from 1. FC Köln)
27	DF	TOG	Frederic Ananou (from Sint-Truiden)
34	MF	FIN	Anssi Suhonen (on loan from Hamburger SV)

Out:

No.	Pos.	Nation	Player
18	MF	GER	Niclas Anspach (to FC Homburg)
21	MF	GER	Tobias Eisenhuth (to Viktoria Köln)
27	FW	GER	Dominik Kother (to Dynamo Dresden)
40	FW	TOG	Mansour Ouro-Tagba (loan return to 1. FC Köln)

== See also ==
- 2024–25 Bundesliga
- 2024–25 2. Bundesliga
