= 2024–25 1. FC Köln season =

1. FC Köln
2024–25 season
- Manager: Gerhard Struber (until 5 May); Friedhelm Funkel (from 5 May)
- Stadium: RheinEnergieStadion
- 2. Bundesliga: 1st (promoted)
- DFB-Pokal: Quarter-finals
- Top goalscorer: League: Tim Lemperle and Damion Downs (10); All: Tim Lemperle and Damion Downs (10)
- Average home league attendance: 49,929
- Biggest win: 1. FC Köln 5–0 Eintracht Braunschweig
- Biggest defeat: 1. FC Köln 1–5 SV Darmstadt 98
Home colours	Away colours	Third colours

The 2024–25 season was the 77th season in the history of 1. FC Köln. In addition to the domestic league, the team is scheduled to participate in the DFB-Pokal. After a 4–0 win against Kaiserslautern on the final matchday, they secured promotion at first attempt and then finished as champions of the 2. Bundesliga after already-promoted Hamburger SV lost 3–2 to Greuther Fürth.

== Transfers ==
=== In ===
Pos.	Player	Transferred from	Fee	Date	Source
MF	(Luxembourg) Mathias Olesen	(Switzerland) Yverdon-Sport	Loan return	30 June 2024	
GK	(Germany) Jonas Urbig	(Germany) Greuther Fürth	Loan return	30 June 2024	
DF	(Croatia) Nikola Soldo	(Germany) 1. FC Kaiserslautern	Loan return	30 June 2024	
FW	(Germany) Marvin Obuz	(Germany) Rot-Weiss Essen	Loan return	30 June 2024	
FW	(Germany) Tim Lemperle	(Germany) Greuther Fürth	Loan return	30 June 2024	
MF	(Germany) Chilohelm Onuoha	(Germany) RB Leipzig U19		1 July 2024	
FW	(Togo) Mansour Ouro-Tagba	(Germany) 1860 Munich		1 July 2024	
DF	(Denmark) Rasmus Carstensen	(Belgium) Genk	€1,500,000	1 July 2024	
FW	(Germany) Luca Waldschmidt	(Germany) VfL Wolfsburg	Undisclosed	1 July 2024	
DF	(Bosnia and Herzegovina) Jusuf Gazibegović	(Austria) Sturm Graz	€2,000,000	1 January 2025	
FW	(Bosnia and Herzegovina) Imad Rondić	(Poland) Widzew Łódź	€1,500,000	3 February 2025	

=== Out ===
Pos.	Player	Transferred to	Fee	Date	Source
DF	(Denmark) Rasmus Carstensen	(Belgium) Genk	Loan return	30 June 2024	
MF	(Germany) Faride Alidou	(Germany) Eintracht Frankfurt	Loan return	30 June 2024	
DF	(Germany) Benno Schmitz	(Switzerland) Grasshopper	End of contract	1 July 2024	
FW	(Germany) Davie Selke	(Germany) Hamburger SV	End of contract	1 July 2024	
FW	(Togo) Mansour Ouro-Tagba	(Germany) Jahn Regensburg	Loan	1 July 2024	
DF	(Germany) Jeff Chabot	(Germany) VfB Stuttgart	€4,000,000	1 July 2024	
FW	(Germany) Justin Diehl	(Germany) VfB Stuttgart	End of contract	1 July 2024	
MF	(Germany) Chilohelm Onuoha	(Germany) SC Verl	Loan	2 July 2024	
FW	(Armenia) Sargis Adamyan	(Germany) Jahn Regensburg	Loan	3 January 2025	
FW	(Germany) Florian Dietz	(Austria) Rheindorf Altach	Loan	5 January 2025	
DF	(Germany) Elias Bakatukanda	(Austria) Blau-Weiß Linz	Loan	8 January 2025	

== Friendlies ==
=== Pre-season ===
29 June 2024 Friendly	VfL Rheingold 1912 Köln-Poll	0–18	1. FC Köln	Cologne
14:00 UTC+2		Report	Adamyan 2'; Waldschmidt 6' (pen.), 12', 36'; Martel 20', 24', 45'; Downs 49', 63', 79', 89'; Tigges 50', 67'; Olesen 54'; Wäschenbach 60'; Huseinbašić 74'; Čuber Potočnik 76'; Dietz 86'	Stadium: Südstadion; Attendance: 2,500

5 July 2024 Friendly	Sportfreunden Siegen	0–6	1. FC Köln	Siegen
15:45 UTC+2		Report	Waldschmidt 7'; Huseinbašić 10'; Lemperle 30', 41'; Martel 36'; Adamyan 72' (pen.)	Stadium: Leimbachstadion; Attendance: 6,500; Referee: Felix Weller

10 July 2024 Friendly	SC Union Nettetal	v	1. FC Köln	Nettetal
18:00
Note: The match was cancelled due to security concerns.

13 July 2024 Friendly	1. FC Köln	3–1	Kickers Offenbach	Cologne
14:00	Hübers 36'; Adamyan 54', 77'	Report	Mustafa 6'	Stadium: Südstadion; Attendance: 4,100; Referee: Lutz Meyersieck

19 July 2024 Friendly	1. FC Köln	3–0	Sint-Truiden	Euskirchen
18:00	Lemperle 17'; Downs 54'; Dietz 79'	Report		Stadium: Heinz-Flohe-Stadion; Attendance: 3,500

20 July 2024 Friendly	Viktoria Köln	3–3	1. FC Köln	Cologne
14:00	Engelhardt 4'; Vrenezi 50'; Güler 74'	Report	Adamyan 19'; Heintz 43'; Dietz 47'; Smajić (yellow card) 64'; Thielmann (red card) 89'	Stadium: Sportpark Höhenberg; Attendance: 6,214; Referee: Luca Marx

24 July 2024 Friendly	1. FC Köln	2–1	Swansea City	Bad Waltersdorf, Austria
16:00	Lemperle 11', 14'		Cabango 41'	Stadium: Thermenstadion

27 July 2024 Friendly	Udinese	2–3	1. FC Köln	St. Veit an der Glan, Austria
16:00 UTC+2	Success 8'; Lucca 25'		Downs 45'; Kabasele 45+1' (o.g.); Ljubičić 67'	Stadium: Sportplatz St. Veit Rennbahn

=== Mid-season ===
20 March 2025 Friendly	1. FC Köln	1–2	SC Verl
14:00

== Competitions ==
=== Overall record ===
Competition	First match	Last match	Starting round	Record							
Competition	First match	Last match	Starting round	Pld	W	D	L	GF	GA	GD	Win %
2. Bundesliga	2 August 2024	18 May 2025	Matchday 1	34	18	7	9	53	38	+15	52.94
DFB-Pokal	18 August 2024	5 February 2025	Quarter-finals	4	3	0	1	10	6	+4	75.00
Total				38	21	7	10	63	44	+19	55.26

Last updated: 21 September 2025
Source: DFB

=== 2. Bundesliga ===
==== League table ====
Pos	Team	Pld	W	D	L	GF	GA	GD	Pts	Promotion, qualification or relegation
1	1. FC Köln (C, P)	34	18	7	9	53	38	+15	61	Promotion to Bundesliga
2	Hamburger SV (P)	34	16	11	7	78	44	+34	59	Promotion to Bundesliga
3	SV Elversberg	34	16	10	8	64	37	+27	58	Qualification for promotion play-offs
4	SC Paderborn	34	15	10	9	56	46	+10	55	
5	1. FC Magdeburg	34	14	11	9	64	52	+12	53	

Source: Bundesliga
Rules for classification: 1) Points; 2) Goal difference; 3) Goals scored; 4) Head-to-head results; 5) Head-to-head away goals scored; 6) Away goals scored; 7) Play-off.
(Rules 4–6 only apply after home and away matches have been played between the tied teams.)
(C) Champions; (P) Promoted

==== Results summary ====
Overall								Home						Away					
Pld	W	D	L	GF	GA	GD	Pts	W	D	L	GF	GA	GD	W	D	L	GF	GA	GD
34	18	7	9	53	38	+15	61	9	4	4	33	18	+15	9	3	5	20	20	0

Last updated: 21 September 2025.
Source: DFB

==== Results by round ====
Round	1	2	3	4	5	6	7	8	9	10	11	12	13	14	15	16	17	18	19	20	21	22	23	24	25	26	27	28	29	30	31	32	33	34
Ground	H	A	H	A	H	A	H	H	A	H	A	H	A	H	A	H	A	A	H	A	H	A	H	A	A	H	A	H	A	H	A	H	A	H
Result	L	D	W	W	L	D	D	W	L	L	W	W	W	D	W	W	W	L	W	W	W	L	D	L	W	W	W	L	D	W	L	D	W	W
Position	12	13	8	6	8	9	8	7	10	12	11	7	5	7	6	2	1	3	2	1	1	1	2	5	2	2	1	2	2	1	1	2	2	1

Updated to match(es) played on 18 May 2025. Source: DFB
A = Away; H = Home; W = Win; D = Draw; L = Loss

==== Matches ====
2 August 2024 1	1. FC Köln	1–2	Hamburger SV	Cologne
20:30	Lemperle (yellow card) 39'; Pauli (yellow card) 69'; Maina 78'	Report	Königsdörffer 5', 35', (yellow card) 86'; Muheim (yellow card) 45+3'	Stadium: RheinEnergieStadion; Attendance: 50,000; Referee: Max Burda

10 August 2024 2	SV Elversberg	2–2	1. FC Köln	Spiesen-Elversberg
13:00	Feil (yellow card) 29'; Gerezgiher (yellow card) 48'; Asllani 46' (yellow card) 67'; Schmahl 62'	Report	Huseinbasic 22'; Martel (yellow card) 45+4'; Heintz (yellow card) 60'; Hübers 84'	Stadium: Waldstadion an der Kaiserlinde; Attendance: 9,502; Referee: Tom Bauer

24 August 2024 3	1. FC Köln	5–0	Eintracht Braunschweig	Cologne
20:30	Hübers 26'; Thielmann (yellow card) 29'; Lemperle 58'; Ljubicic 58', 61'; Waldschmidt (yellow card) 77' (goal) 88'	Report	Scherning 30'; Tauer (yellow card) 86'	Stadium: RheinEnergieStadion; Attendance: 50,000; Referee: Matthias Jöllenbeck

1 September 2024 4	Schalke 04	1–3	1. FC Köln	Gelsenkirchen
13:30	Karaman 66' (pen.); Cissé (yellow card) 67'; Aydin (yellow card) 90+3'	Report	Downs 25'; Maina 45+1'; Lemperle 46'; Pauli (yellow card) 53'; Martel (yellow card) 58'; Bakatukanda (yellow card) 78'; Thielmann (yellow card) 84'	Stadium: Veltins-Arena; Attendance: 61,426; Referee: Sven Jablonski

14 September 2024 5	1. FC Köln	1–2	1. FC Magdeburg	Cologne
20:30	Ljubicic (yellow card) 16'; Paqarada (yellow card) 29'; Downs 49'; Martel (yellow card) 58'; Rasmus Carstensen (yellow card) 81'	Report	Hoti (yellow card) 27'; Titz (yellow card) 29'; Gnaka (yellow card) 45+2'; Krempicki (yellow card) 60'; Michel 66'; Hugonet 83'	Stadium: RheinEnergieStadion; Attendance: 50,000; Referee: Richard Hempel

21 September 2024 6	Fortuna Düsseldorf	2–2	1. FC Köln	Düsseldorf
13:00		Report		Stadium: Merkur Spiel-Arena; Referee: Christian Dingert

29 September 2024 7	1. FC Köln	4–4	Karlsruher SC	Cologne
13:30	Waldschmidt 3'; Downs 7' 15'; Lemperle 45+2'	Report	Burnić (yellow card) 6'; Wanitzek 19' 27' (yellow card) 45+4' (goal) 55'; Jensen 52'; Günther (yellow card) 61'	Stadium: RheinEnergieStadion; Attendance: 50,000; Referee: (Germany) Benjamin Brand

5 October 2024 8	1. FC Köln	2–0	Ulm	Cologne
13:00 CET	Hübers 8' (yellow card) 25'; Finkgräfe (yellow card) 34'; Waldschmidt 47' (yellow card) 73'; Paqarada (yellow card) 70'	Report	Max Brandt (red card) 21'; Chessa (yellow card) 84'	Stadium: RheinEnergieStadion; Attendance: 49,900; Referee: (Germany) Patrick Alt

18 October 2024 9	Darmstadt	5–1	1. FC Köln	Darmstadt
18:30 CET	Hornby 11' 40'; Lidberg (yellow card) 41' (goal) 54'; Förster 65'; Vilhelmsson (yellow card) 90'; Vukotić 90+4'	Report	Lemperle 38' (yellow card) 46'; Heintz (yellow card) 90+2'; Hübers (yellow card) 90+3'	Stadium: Merck-Stadion am Böllenfalltor; Attendance: 17,810; Referee: (Germany) Frank Willenborg

25 October 2024 10	1. FC Köln	1–2	Paderborn	Cologne
18:30 CET	Ljubičić (yellow card) 62'; Thielmann 66'	Report	Ansah (yellow card) 40'; Engelns (yellow card) 61'; Castañeda (yellow card) 68'; Zehnter (yellow card) 69'; Michel 76' 80'	Stadium: RheinEnergieStadion; Attendance: 50,000; Referee: (Germany) Florian Lechner

2 November 2024 11	Hertha BSC	0–1	1. FC Köln	Berlin
20:30 CET	Leistner (yellow card) 40'; Dárdai (yellow card) 58'; Karbownik (yellow card) 62'; Þorsteinsson (yellow card) 90+4'	Report	Lemperle 31'; Julian Pauli (yellow card) 72'; Schwäbe (yellow card) 76'	Stadium: Olympiastadion; Attendance: 68,763; Referee: (Germany) Harm Osmers

9 November 2024 12	1. FC Köln	1–0	Greuther Fürth	Cologne
13:00 CET	Heintz (yellow card) 44'; Downs (yellow card) 90+1' (goal) 90+4'	Report	Futkeu (yellow card) 44'; Michalski (yellow card) 45'; Dietz (yellow card) 64'; Jung (yellow card) 90+1'	Stadium: RheinEnergieStadion; Attendance: 49,600; Referee: (Germany) Daniel Schlager

22 November 2024 13	Preußen Münster	0–1	1. FC Köln	Münster
18:45 CET	Preißinger (yellow card) 28'; Jakob Korte (yellow card) 79'; Amenyido (yellow card) 90+6'	Report	Lemperle 51'; Paqarada (yellow card) 55'	Stadium: Preußenstadion; Attendance: 12,422; Referee: (Germany) Felix Prigan

30 November 2024 14	1. FC Köln	2–2	Hannover 96	Cologne
13:00 CET	Lemperle 48'; Kainz (yellow card) 77'; Downs 81'	Report	Ngankam 25'; Nielsen (yellow card) 43'; Christiansen (red card) 54'; Kainz 86' (o.g.)	Stadium: RheinEnergieStadion; Attendance: 50,000; Referee: (Germany) Sören Storks

8 December 2024 15	Jahn Regensburg	0–1	1. FC Köln	Regensburg
13:30 CET	Kother (yellow card) 58'	Report	Heintz (yellow card) 21'; Lemperle 33'; Huseinbašić (yellow card) 73'; Martel (yellow card) 86'	Stadium: Jahnstadion Regensburg; Attendance: 14,232; Referee: (Germany) Konrad Oldhafer

15 December 2024 16	1. FC Köln	3–1	1. FC Nürnberg	Cologne
13:30 CET	Downs 6'; Kainz 17' (pen.); Huseinbašić 31'; Hübers (yellow card) 32'; Heintz (yellow card) 41'; Thielmann (yellow card) 55'; Ljubičić (yellow card) 84'	Report	Yılmaz (yellow card) 50'; Mathenia (yellow card) 57'; Castrop 59'	Stadium: RheinEnergieStadion; Attendance: 50,0000; Referee: (Germany) Robin Braun

22 December 2024 17	1. FC Kaiserslautern	0–1	1. FC Köln	Kaiserslautern
13:30 CET	Gyamerah (yellow card) 56'; Heuer (yellow card) 67'	Report	Ljubičić 33' (yellow card) 40'; Schwäbe (yellow card) 81'; Maina (yellow card) 90+4'	Stadium: Fritz-Walter-Stadion; Attendance: 49,327; Referee: (Germany) Wolfgang Haslberger

18 January 2025 18	Hamburger SV	1–0	1. FC Köln	Hamburg
20:45 CET	Pherai (yellow card) 13'; Königsdörffer 78'; Daniel Elfadli (yellow card) 84'; Mikelbrencis (yellow card) 90+5'	Report	Gazibegović (yellow card) 6'; Waldschmidt (yellow card) 55'; Hübers (yellow card) 73'; Finkgräfe (yellow card) 77'	Stadium: Volksparkstadion; Attendance: 57,000; Referee: (Germany) Christian Dingert

25 January 2025 19	1. FC Köln	1–0	Elversberg	Cologne
13:00 CET	Gazibegović (yellow card) 56'; Ljubičić 81'	Report	Asllani (yellow card) 30'; Neubauer (yellow card) 64'; Filimon Gerezgiher (yellow card) 83'; Elias Baum (yellow card) 90+1' (yellow-red card) 90+3'; Pinckert (yellow card) 90+5'	Stadium: RheinEnergieStadion; Attendance: 49,800; Referee: (Germany) Tom Bauer

1 February 2025 20	Eintracht Braunschweig	1–2	1. FC Köln	Braunschweig
13:00 CET	Bičakčić 1'; Philippe (yellow card) 34'; Gomez (yellow card) 60'; Köhler (yellow card) 79'; Ba (yellow card) 81'	Report	Martel 13'; Downs 30'; Hübers (yellow card) 44'; Paqarada (yellow card) 46'	Stadium: Eintracht-Stadion; Attendance: 21,864; Referee: (Germany) Lars Erbst

9 February 2025 21	1. FC Köln	1–0	Schalke 04	Cologne
13:30 CET	Schmied (yellow card) 34'; Olesen (yellow card) 39'; Downs 43' (yellow card) 72'	Report		Stadium: RheinEnergieStadion; Attendance: 50,000; Referee: Tobias Welz

14 February 2025 22	1. FC Magdeburg	3–0	1. FC Köln	Magdeburg
18:30 CET	Heber 73'; El Hankouri 79'; Loric 90+2'	Report	Thielmann (yellow card) 41'; Finkgrafe (yellow card) 72'	Stadium: Avnet Arena; Attendance: 27,055; Referee: Florian Exner

23 February 2025 23	1. FC Köln	1–1	Schalke 04	Cologne
13:30 CET	Kainz 67'; Paqarada (yellow card) 79'; Maina (yellow card) 87'	Report	Heyer (yellow card) 7'; Kownacki (yellow card) 70'; Haag (yellow card) 72'; Johannesson 90' (pen.)	Stadium: RheinEnergieStadion; Attendance: 50,000; Referee: Michael Bacher

1 March 2025 24	Karlsruher SC	1–0	1. FC Köln	Karlsruhe
20:30 CET	Kobald (yellow card) 3'; Burnic (yellow card) 42'; Hübers 52' (o.g.); Kaufmann (yellow card) 79'; Farhat (yellow card) 89'	Report	Kainz (yellow card) 22'; Hübers (yellow card) 81'; Heintz (yellow card) 89'	Stadium: BBBank Wildpark; Attendance: 32,190; Referee: Richard Hempel

8 March 2025 25	Ulm	0–1	1. FC Köln	Ulm
13:00 CET		Report	Thielmann (yellow card) 53'; Waldschmidt 86'	Stadium: Donaustadion; Attendance: 17,400; Referee: Max Burda

15 March 2025 26	1. FC Köln	2–1	Darmstadt	Cologne
20:30 CET	Thielmann 1'; Ljubicic (yellow card) 67'; Waldschmidt 87' (pen.)	Report	Hornby 25' (pen.) (yellow card) 59' (red card) 66'; Boëtius (yellow card) 90+9'	Stadium: RheinEnergieStadion; Attendance: 50,000; Referee: Florian Heft

29 March 2025 27	Paderborn	0–1	1. FC Köln	Paderborn
13:00 CET	Mehlem 34'; Bilbija (yellow card) 51'; Michel (yellow card) 69'; Riemann (yellow card) 90+7'	Report	Schwäbe (yellow card) 7'; Rondić 42'; Huseinbasic 61'	Stadium: Home Deluxe Arena; Attendance: 15,000; Referee: Frank Willenborg

5 April 2025 28	1. FC Köln	0–1	Hertha Berlin	Cologne
20:30 CET	Lemperle (yellow card) 20'	Report	Kenny (yellow card) 19'; Cuisance (yellow card) 35'; Gechter (yellow card) 41'; Winkler (yellow card) 82'	Stadium: RheinEnergieStadion; Attendance: 50,000; Referee: Sven Jablonski

11 April 2025 29	Greuther Fürth	1–1	1. FC Köln	Fürth
18:30 CET	Futkeu 12'; Dietz (yellow card) 89'	Report	Schmied (yellow card) 13'; Kainz (yellow card) 38'; Waldschmidt 45'; Lemperle (yellow card) 56'; Huseinbasic (yellow card) 70'; Uth (yellow card) 71'; Ljubicic (yellow card) 82'	Stadium: Sportpark Ronhof Thomas Sommer; Attendance: 15,294; Referee: Patrick Alt

20 April 2025 30	1. FC Köln	3–1	Preußen Münster	Cologne
13:30 CET	Lemperle 11'; Thielmann (yellow card) 34'; Waldschmidt 45+1' (pen.); Downs 56'	Report	Hübers 39' (o.g.); Lorenz (yellow card) 82'	Stadium: RheinEnergieStadion; Attendance: 50,000; Referee: Tom Bauer

27 April 2025 31	Hannover 96	1–0	1. FC Köln	Hannover
13:30 CET	Neimann (yellow card) 48'; Gindorf 57'; Ezeh (yellow card) 62'; Kunze (yellow card) 77'; Halstenberg (yellow card) 83'	Report	Paqarada (yellow card) 23' (yellow-red card) 50'; Finkgrafe (yellow card) 56'; Heintz (yellow card) 83'	Stadium: Niedersachsenstadion; Attendance: 15,294; Referee: Timo Gansloweit

3 May 2025 32	1. FC Köln	1–1	Jahn Regensburg	Cologne
20:30 CET	Lemperle 59'	Report	Ballas (yellow card) 64'; Ganaus 79'	Stadium: RheinEnergieStadion; Attendance: 49,500; Referee: Nicolas Winter

9 May 2025 33	1. FC Nürnberg	1–2	1. FC Köln	Nürnberg
18:30 CET	Gruber (yellow card) 42'; Antiste 46'; Drexler (yellow card) 62'; Lubach (yellow card) 66'; Valentini (yellow card) 90+3'	Report	Huseinbasic (yellow card) 87'; Kainz 90'	Stadium: Max-Morlock-Stadion; Attendance: 50,000; Referee: Robert Hartmann

18 May 2025 34	1. FC Köln	4–0	1. FC Kaiserslautern	Cologne
15:30 CET	Martel 14'; Waldschmidt 29'; Kainz 76'; Uth 87'	Report	Ritter (yellow card) 45+2'; Ronstadt (yellow card) 70'	Stadium: RheinEnergieStadion; Attendance: 50,000; Referee: Sören Storks

=== DFB-Pokal ===
18 August 2024 First round	SV Sandhausen	2–3 (a.e.t.)	1. FC Köln	Sandhausen
15:30	Lorch (yellow card) 41'; Halimi 59'; Iwe (yellow card) 70'; Meier 90+6' (yellow card) 95'; Greil (yellow card) 104'	Report	Pauli 20'; Maina 34' (yellow card) 75'; Thielmann (yellow card) 66'; Adamyan (yellow card) 73'; Carstensen (yellow card) 97'; Olesen 116'; Huseinbasic (yellow card) 118'	Stadium: Hardtwaldstadion; Attendance: 9,705; Referee: Benjamin Brand

29 October 2024 Second round	1. FC Köln	3–0	Holstein Kiel	Cologne
20:45	Lemperle 8' (yellow card) 89'; Huseinbašić (yellow card) 44'; Struber (yellow card) 71'; Waldschmidt 84', 90+7'; Paqarada (yellow card) 90+4'	Report	Gigović (yellow card) 37'; Porath (yellow card) 52'; Machino (yellow card) 75'; Rapp (yellow card) 76'; Arp (yellow card) 79'	Stadium: RheinEnergieStadion; Attendance: 50,000; Referee: Bastian Dankert

4 December 2024 Round of 16	1. FC Köln	2–1 (a.e.t.)	Hertha BSC	Cologne
18:00 CET	Hübers (yellow card) 25'; Heintz (yellow card) 28'; Niederlechner 30' (o.g.); Lemperle (yellow card) 60'; Ljubičić 120+1' (pen.) (yellow card) 120+2'	Report	Maza 12' (pen.); Zeefuik (red card) 25'; Demme (yellow card) 69'; Bouchalakis (yellow card) 120'	Stadium: RheinEnergieStadion; Attendance: 50,000; Referee: Tobias Reichel

5 February 2025 Quarter-finals	Bayer Leverkusen	3–2 (a.e.t.)	1. FC Köln	Leverkusen
20:45 CET	Schick 61', 90+6'; Xhaka (yellow card) 70'; Boniface 98'; Wirtz (yellow card) 104'; Garcia (yellow card) 119'	Report	Heintz (yellow card) 19'; Downs 45+10'; Maina 54'; Hübers (yellow card) 64'; Thielmann (yellow card) 90+5'; Struber (yellow card) 90+5'	Stadium: BayArena; Attendance: 30,210; Referee: Frank Willenborg
