= 2023–24 1. FC Köln season =

1. FC Köln
2023–24 season
- President: Werner Wolf
- Head coach: Steffen Baumgart (until 31 December); Timo Schultz (from 4 January)
- Stadium: RheinEnergieStadion
- Bundesliga: 17th (relegated)
- DFB-Pokal: Second round
- Top goalscorer: League: Davie Selke (6); All: Davie Selke (6)
- Average home league attendance: 49,829
Home colours	Away colours	Third colours

The 2023–24 season was 1. FC Köln's 76th season in existence and fifth consecutive season in the Bundesliga. They also competed in the DFB-Pokal.

== Players ==
=== First-team squad ===
As of 31 January 2024

Note: Flags indicate national team as defined under FIFA eligibility rules; some limited exceptions apply. Players may hold more than one non-FIFA nationality.

No.	Pos.	Nation	Player
1	GK	GER	Marvin Schwäbe
2	DF	GER	Benno Schmitz
3	DF	GER	Dominique Heintz
4	DF	GER	Timo Hübers
6	MF	GER	Eric Martel
7	MF	AUT	Dejan Ljubičić
8	MF	BIH	Denis Huseinbašić
9	FW	GER	Luca Waldschmidt (on loan from VfL Wolfsburg)
11	MF	AUT	Florian Kainz
12	GK	GER	Jonas Nickisch
13	FW	GER	Mark Uth
15	DF	GER	Luca Kilian
17	DF	KOS	Leart Paqarada
18	DF	DEN	Rasmus Carstensen (on loan from Genk)

No.	Pos.	Nation	Player
20	GK	GER	Philipp Pentke
21	FW	GER	Steffen Tigges
22	MF	DEN	Jacob Steen Christensen
23	FW	ARM	Sargis Adamyan
24	DF	GER	Jeff Chabot
27	FW	GER	Davie Selke
29	FW	GER	Jan Thielmann
33	FW	GER	Florian Dietz
35	DF	GER	Max Finkgräfe
37	MF	GER	Linton Maina
38	DF	GER	Elias Bakatukanda
40	MF	GER	Faride Alidou (on loan from Eintracht Frankfurt)
44	GK	GER	Matthias Köbbing

=== Players out on loan ===
Note: Flags indicate national team as defined under FIFA eligibility rules; some limited exceptions apply. Players may hold more than one non-FIFA nationality.

No.	Pos.	Nation	Player
—	FW	GER	Tim Lemperle (at (Germany) Greuther Fürth until 30 June 2024)
—	FW	GER	Marvin Obuz (at (Germany) Rot-Weiss Essen until 30 June 2024)
—	MF	LUX	Mathias Olesen (at Yverdon until 30 June 2024)

No.	Pos.	Nation	Player
—	DF	CRO	Nikola Soldo (at (Germany) 1. FC Kaiserslautern until 30 June 2024)
—	GK	GER	Jonas Urbig (at (Germany) Greuther Fürth until 30 June 2024)

== Transfers ==
=== In ===
Pos.	Player	Transferred from	Fee	Date	Source
DF	(Germany) Jeff Chabot	(Italy) Sampdoria	€2,500,000	1 July 2023	
MF	(Denmark) Jacob Christensen	(Denmark) Nordsjælland	Free	1 July 2023	
GK	(Germany) Jonas Nickish	(Germany) RB Leipzig	Free	1 July 2023	
DF	(Kosovo) Leart Paqarada	(Germany) FC St. Pauli	Free	1 July 2023	
FW	(Germany) Luca Waldschmidt	(Germany) VfL Wolfsburg	Loan	1 July 2023	
GK	(Germany) Philipp Pentke	(Germany) 1899 Hoffenheim	Free	1 August 2023	
DF	(Denmark) Rasmus Carstensen	(Belgium) Genk	Loan	3 August 2023	
FW	(Germany) Faride Alidou	(Germany) Eintracht Frankfurt	Loan	21 August 2023	
DF	(Germany) Dominique Heintz	(Germany) Union Berlin	Undisclosed	31 August 2023	

=== Out ===
Pos.	Player	Transferred to	Fee	Date	Source
FW	(Sweden) Sebastian Andersson		Free	1 July 2023	
MF	(Slovakia) Ondrej Duda	(Italy) Hellas Verona	€2,700,000	1 July 2023	
DF	(Germany) Jonas Hector	Retired		1 July 2023	
GK	(Germany) Timo Horn		Free	1 July 2023	
FW	(Germany) Tim Lemperle	(Germany) Greuther Fürth	Loan	1 July 2023	
MF	(Ghana) Kingsley Schindler	(Turkey) Samsunspor	Free	1 July 2023	
MF	(Tunisia) Ellyes Skhiri	(Germany) Eintracht Frankfurt	Free	1 July 2023	
GK	(Germany) Jonas Urbig	(Germany) Greuther Fürth	Loan	5 July 2023	
FW	(Germany) Marvin Obuz	(Germany) Rot-Weiss Essen	Loan	7 July 2023	
DF	(Croatia) Nikola Soldo	(Germany) 1. FC Kaiserslautern	Loan	16 August 2023	
DF	(Denmark) Kristian Pedersen	(Wales) Swansea City	Free	1 September 2023	
MF	(Greece) Dimitrios Limnios	(Greece) Panathinaikos	Undisclosed	1 January 2024	
MF	(Luxembourg) Mathias Olesen	(Switzerland) Yverdon	Loan	23 January 2024	
DF	(Germany) Noah Katterbach	(Germany) Hamburger SV	Free	31 January 2024	

== Pre-season and friendlies ==
Win Draw Loss Fixtures

16 July 2023 Friendly	1. FC Köln	0–1	Hannover 96	St. Johann, Austria
15:00 CEST (UTC+2)		Report	Teuchert 35'
Note: The match was played as a forty-five minute game.

16 July 2023 Friendly	1. FC Köln	3–1	Górnik Zabrze	St. Johann, Austria
16:00 CEST (UTC+2)	Adamyan 11'; Hübers 45'; Selke 45+2'	Report	Olkowski 35'
Note: The match was played as a forty-five minute game.

21 July 2023 Friendly	1. FC Köln	1–1	Mallorca	Salzburg, Austria
15:00 CEST (UTC+2)	Olesen 62'	Report	Mascarell 43'	Stadium: Max-Aicher-Stadion

28 July 2023 Friendly	Fortuna Köln	2–2	1. FC Köln	Cologne
18:30 CEST (UTC+2)	Mika 71', 82'	Report	Waldschmidt 55'; Selke 83'	Stadium: Südstadion; Attendance: 9,503

29 July 2023 Friendly	1. FC Köln	2–0	Erzgebirge Aue	Euskirchen
14:00 CEST (UTC+2)	Waldschmidt 6'; Selke 17'	Report		Stadium: Erftstadion Euskirchen; Attendance: 3,200

5 August 2023 Friendly	1. FC Köln	2–0	Nantes	Cologne
18:30 CEST (UTC+2)	Waldschmidt 50'; Adamyan 64'	Report		Stadium: RheinEnergieStadion; Attendance: 32,400

6 September 2023 Friendly	SV Bergisch Gladbach 09	0–6	1. FC Köln	Bergisch Gladbach
18:00 CEST (UTC+2)			Tigges 3'; Alidou 5'; Downs 58'; Pinto 62'; Waschenbach 67'; Pauli 73'	Stadium: BELKAW-Arena

11 October 2023 Friendly	SC Germania Reusrath	0–15	1. FC Köln	Langenfeld
18:00 CEST (UTC+2)		Report	Waldschmidt 9', 23'; Uth 26' (pen.), 54'; Martel 30'; Kilian 40', 67', 85' (pen.); Tigges 44', 59'; Adamyan 52', 76'; Dietz 57', 70'; Huseinbašić 88'	Stadium: Jahnstadion

15 November 2023 Friendly	SpVg Porz	0–8	1. FC Köln	Porz
18:00 CET (UTC+1)		Report	Limnios 3'; Maina 10'; Huseinbašić 36', 41'; Finkgräfe 58'; Waldschmidt 79'; Tigges 82', 88'	Stadium: Sportanlage Humboldtstraße

6 January 2024 Friendly	Rot-Weiss Essen	4–4	1. FC Köln	Essen
14:00 CET (UTC+1)	Obuz 1'; Vonic 17', 42'; Berlinski 81'	Report	Selke 26'; Waldschmidt 49'; Dietz 84' (pen.); Thielmann 99'	Stadium: Stadion an der Hafenstraße; Attendance: 4,500; Referee: Felix May
Note: Match was played in two periods of 60 minutes.

22 March 2024 Friendly	1. FC Köln	2–2	Breiðablik	Algorfa, Spain
16:30 CET (UTC+1)	Alidou 10'; Downs 75'	Report	Steindórsson 26'; Stokke 84'	Attendance: 0

== Competitions ==
=== Overall record ===
Competition	First match	Last match	Starting round	Final position	Record							
Competition	First match	Last match	Starting round	Final position	Pld	W	D	L	GF	GA	GD	Win %
Bundesliga	19 August 2023	18 May 2024	Matchday 1	17th	34	5	12	17	28	60	−32	14.71
DFB-Pokal	14 August 2023	31 October 2023	First round	Second round	2	1	0	1	5	4	+1	50.00
Total					36	6	12	18	33	64	−31	16.67

Source: Soccerway

=== Bundesliga ===
==== League table ====
Pos	Team	Pld	W	D	L	GF	GA	GD	Pts	Qualification or relegation
14	Borussia Mönchengladbach	34	7	13	14	56	67	−11	34	
15	Union Berlin	34	9	6	19	33	58	−25	33	
16	VfL Bochum (O)	34	7	12	15	42	74	−32	33	Qualification for the relegation play-offs
17	1. FC Köln (R)	34	5	12	17	28	60	−32	27	Relegation to 2. Bundesliga
18	Darmstadt 98 (R)	34	3	8	23	30	86	−56	17	Relegation to 2. Bundesliga

Source: DFB
Rules for classification: 1) Points; 2) Goal difference; 3) Goals scored; 4) Head-to-head results; 5) Head-to-head away goals scored; 6) Away goals scored; 7) Play-off.
(O) Play-off winners; (R) Relegated

==== Results summary ====
Overall								Home						Away					
Pld	W	D	L	GF	GA	GD	Pts	W	D	L	GF	GA	GD	W	D	L	GF	GA	GD
34	5	12	17	28	60	−32	27	4	4	9	15	28	−13	1	8	8	13	32	−19

Source: DFB

==== Results by round ====
Round	1	2	3	4	5	6	7	8	9	10	11	12	13	14	15	16	17	18	19	20	21	22	23	24	25	26	27	28	29	30	31	32	33	34
Ground	A	H	A	H	A	H	A	H	A	H	A	H	A	H	A	A	H	H	A	H	A	H	A	H	A	H	A	H	A	H	A	H	H	A
Result	L	L	D	L	L	L	L	W	L	D	D	L	W	D	L	L	D	L	D	W	D	L	D	L	D	L	D	W	L	L	D	D	W	L
Position	13	15	14	16	16	17	18	16	17	18	17	18	15	16	16	17	17	17	16	16	16	16	16	16	16	17	17	17	17	17	17	17	17	17

Source: DFB
A = Away; H = Home; W = Win; D = Draw; L = Loss

==== Matches ====
The league fixtures were unveiled on 30 June 2023.

19 August 2023 1	Borussia Dortmund	1–0	1. FC Köln	Dortmund
18:30 CEST (UTC+2)	Malen 88', (yellow card) 90+1'	Report		Stadium: Signal Iduna Park; Attendance: 81,365; Referee: Deniz Aytekin

26 August 2023 2	1. FC Köln	1–2	VfL Wolfsburg	Cologne
15:30 CEST (UTC+2)	Adamyan (yellow card) 49'; Waldschmidt 55'	Report	Černý (yellow card) 58'; Wind 62', 79', (yellow card) 90'; Majer (yellow card) 79'; Arnold (yellow card) 89'; Zesiger (yellow card) 90+4'	Stadium: RheinEnergieStadion; Attendance: 49,500; Referee: Matthias Jöllenbeck

3 September 2023 3	Eintracht Frankfurt	1–1	1. FC Köln	Frankfurt
15:30 CEST (UTC+2)	Marmoush (yellow card) 64'; Nkounkou 87'	Report	Kainz 43' (pen.); Ljubičić (yellow card) 45+1'; Martel (yellow card) 45+3'; Schmitz (yellow card) 70'	Stadium: Deutsche Bank Park; Attendance: 54,000; Referee: Florian Badstübner

16 September 2023 4	1. FC Köln	1–3	1899 Hoffenheim	Cologne
15:30 CEST (UTC+2)	Hübers (yellow card) 34'; Chabot (yellow card) 45+3'; Selke 61'; Carstensen (yellow card) 64' (yellow-red card) 90+1'	Report	Kramarić 1'; Skov (yellow card) 23'; Grillitsch 28', (yellow card) 75'; Beier 52'; Kadeřábek (yellow card) 68'; Brooks (yellow card) 69'	Stadium: RheinEnergieStadion; Attendance: 49,300; Referee: Daniel Siebert

23 September 2023 5	Werder Bremen	2–1	1. FC Köln	Bremen
18:30 CEST (UTC+2)	Borré 38'; Njinmah 67'; Weiser (yellow card) 79'; Veljković (yellow card) 88'	Report	Selke 31'; Alidou (yellow card) 73'	Stadium: Weserstadion; Attendance: 42,100; Referee: Bastian Dankert

30 September 2023 6	1. FC Köln	0–2	VfB Stuttgart	Cologne
15:30 CEST (UTC+2)	Ljubičić (yellow card) 26'; Huseinbašić (yellow card) 55'	Report	Undav 68', 88'; Millot (yellow card) 79'	Stadium: RheinEnergieStadion; Attendance: 50,000; Referee: Tobias Stieler

8 October 2023 7	Bayer Leverkusen	3–0	1. FC Köln	Leverkusen
15:30 CEST (UTC+2)	Hofmann 22'; Frimpong (yellow card) 23', (goal) 32'; Tapsoba (yellow card) 45+4'; Tah (yellow card) 61'; Boniface 67'	Report	Baumgart (yellow card) 24'	Stadium: BayArena; Attendance: 30,210; Referee: Felix Zwayer

22 October 2023 8	1. FC Köln	3–1	Borussia Mönchengladbach	Cologne
15:30 CEST (UTC+2)	Kainz 9' (pen.), 76' (pen.); Waldschmidt 90'	Report	Elvedi 63'; Koné (red card) 72'; Nicolas (yellow card) 74'; Scally (yellow card) 90+5'	Stadium: RheinEnergieStadion; Attendance: 50,000; Referee: Deniz Aytekin

28 October 2023 9	RB Leipzig	6–0	1. FC Köln	Leipzig
18:30 CEST (UTC+2)	Werner 15' (pen.); Simakan (yellow card) 19'; Openda 40', 45+3'; Raum 43'; Klostermann (yellow card) 79'; Šeško 88'; Baumgartner 90+1'	Report	Chabot (yellow card) 29'; Olesen (yellow card) 72' (yellow-red card) 80'; Kilian (yellow card) 85'	Stadium: Red Bull Arena; Attendance: 46,480; Referee: Benjamin Brand

4 November 2023 10	1. FC Köln	1–1	FC Augsburg	Cologne
15:30 CET (UTC+1)	Maina 16'; Selke (yellow card) 90+7'	Report	Tietz 25'; Demirović (yellow card) 40'; Gouweleeuw (yellow card) 90+2'; Dahmen (yellow card) 90+6'; Breithaupt (yellow card) 90+7'	Stadium: RheinEnergieStadion; Attendance: 49,300; Referee: Christian Dingert

11 November 2023 11	VfL Bochum	1–1	1. FC Köln	Bochum
18:30 CET (UTC+1)	Daschner 25', (yellow card) 77'; Hofmann (yellow card) 33'; Mašović (yellow card) 40'; Bernardo (yellow card) 90'	Report	Selke 54'; Thielmann (yellow card) 89'	Stadium: Ruhrstadion; Attendance: 26,000; Referee: Matthias Jöllenbeck

24 November 2023 12	1. FC Köln	0–1	Bayern Munich	Cologne
20:30 CET (UTC+1)		Report	Kane 20'; Choupo-Moting (yellow card) 52'	Stadium: RheinEnergieStadion; Attendance: 50,000; Referee: Marco Fritz

1 December 2023 13	Darmstadt 98	0–1	1. FC Köln	Darmstadt
20:30 CET (UTC+1)	Seydel (yellow card) 64'	Report	Kainz (yellow card) 18'; Selke 60', (yellow card) 71'; Hübers (yellow card) 68'	Stadium: Merck-Stadion am Böllenfalltor; Attendance: 17,810; Referee: Patrick Ittrich

10 December 2023 14	1. FC Köln	0–0	Mainz 05	Cologne
17:30 CET (UTC+1)	Martel (yellow card) 50'; Uth (yellow card) 85'	Report	Krauß (yellow card) 58'; Kohr (yellow card) 83'; Papela (yellow card) 84'; Widmer (yellow card) 87'	Stadium: RheinEnergieStadion; Attendance: 50,000; Referee: Frank Willenborg

17 December 2023 15	SC Freiburg	2–0	1. FC Köln	Freiburg
15:30 CET (UTC+1)	Höfler (yellow card) 40'; Gregoritsch 72'; Sallai 90+5'	Report	Ljubičić (yellow card) 27'; Chabot (yellow card) 31' (yellow-red card) 62'; Kainz (yellow card) 57'	Stadium: Europa-Park Stadion; Attendance: 34,700; Referee: Harm Osmers

20 December 2023 16	Union Berlin	2–0	1. FC Köln	Berlin
18:30 CET (UTC+1)	Hollerbach 55'; Fofana 78'	Report		Stadium: Stadion An der Alten Försterei; Attendance: 22,012; Referee: Deniz Aytekin

13 January 2024 17	1. FC Köln	1–1	1. FC Heidenheim	Cologne
15:30 CET (UTC+1)	Chabot (yellow card) 12'; Selke 29'; Hübers (yellow card) 41'	Report	Pieringer (yellow card) 16'; Beck 55'	Stadium: RheinEnergieStadion; Attendance: 50,000; Referee: Felix Zwayer

20 January 2024 18	1. FC Köln	0–4	Borussia Dortmund	Cologne
15:30 CET (UTC+1)	Chabot (yellow card) 77'; Thielmann (yellow card) 85'	Report	Malen 12', 61'; Özcan (yellow card) 27'; Füllkrug 58' (pen.); Maatsen (yellow card) 82'; Moukoko 90+4'	Stadium: RheinEnergieStadion; Attendance: 50,000; Referee: Daniel Schlager

27 January 2024 19	VfL Wolfsburg	1–1	1. FC Köln	Wolfsburg
15:30 CET (UTC+1)	Paredes 40', (yellow card) 73'; Svanberg (yellow card) 57'; Mæhle (yellow card) 69'; Lacroix (yellow card) 77'; Pejčinović (yellow card) 90+1'	Report	Alidou 38'; Schmitz (yellow card) 43'; Ljubičić (yellow card) 45+8'; Huseinbašić (yellow card) 77'	Stadium: Volkswagen Arena; Attendance: 24,525; Referee: Sören Storks

3 February 2024 20	1. FC Köln	2–0	Eintracht Frankfurt	Cologne
18:30 CET (UTC+1)	Huseinbašić (yellow card) 19'; Alidou 68'; Thielmann 80'	Report	Tuta (yellow card) 34' (yellow-red card) 83'; Nkounkou (yellow card) 55' (yellow-red card) 66'	Stadium: RheinEnergieStadion; Attendance: 50,000; Referee: Timo Gerach

11 February 2024 21	1899 Hoffenheim	1–1	1. FC Köln	Sinsheim
17:30 CET (UTC+1)	Bebou (yellow card) 32'; Stach (yellow card) 78'; Grillitsch (yellow card) 81'; Kramarić 90+4'	Report	Schmitz (yellow card) 55'; Maina (yellow card) 76'; Chabot (yellow card) 76'; Finkgräfe 79', (yellow card) 84'	Stadium: Rhein-Neckar-Arena; Attendance: 23,020; Referee: Christian Dingert

16 February 2024 22	1. FC Köln	0–1	Werder Bremen	Cologne
13:30 CET (UTC+1)	Kainz (yellow card) 26'; Thielmann (yellow card) 77'; Huseinbašić (yellow card) 90+2'; Hübers (yellow card) 90+5'	Report	Schmid (yellow card) 26'; Njinmah 70'; Weiser (yellow card) 77'; Malatini (yellow card) 88'	Stadium: RheinEnergieStadion; Attendance: 50,000; Referee: Daniel Siebert

24 February 2024 23	VfB Stuttgart	1–1	1. FC Köln	Stuttgart
15:30 CET (UTC+1)	Rouault (yellow card) 42'; Millot 53'	Report	Martel 62'	Stadium: MHPArena; Attendance: 54,500; Referee: Patrick Ittrich

3 March 2024 24	1. FC Köln	0–2	Bayer Leverkusen	Cologne
15:30 CET (UTC+1)	Thielmann (red card) 14'; Ljubičić (yellow card) 16'; Martel (yellow card) 30'	Report	Frimpong (yellow card) 23', (goal) 38'; Stanišić (yellow card) 59'; Grimaldo 73'	Stadium: RheinEnergieStadion; Attendance: 50,000; Referee: Tobias Stieler

9 March 2024 25	Borussia Mönchengladbach	3–3	1. FC Köln	Mönchengladbach
15:30 CET (UTC+1)	Pefok (yellow card) 31'; Honorat 32'; Neuhaus (yellow card) 47'; Hack 71', 73'; Weigl (yellow card) 83'	Report	Alidou 7', 64'; Finkgräfe (yellow card) 22'; Chabot (yellow card) 39'; Hübers (yellow card) 41'; Downs 79'; Martel (yellow card) 83'	Stadium: Borussia-Park; Attendance: 54,042; Referee: Felix Zwayer

15 March 2024 26	1. FC Köln	1–5	RB Leipzig	Cologne
20:30 CET (UTC+1)	Adamyan 18'; Finkgräfe (yellow card) 49'; Alidou (yellow card) 66'	Report	Simons 15', (yellow card) 62'; Openda 63', 67'; Haidara 70', (yellow card) 72'; Poulsen 82'	Stadium: RheinEnergieStadion; Attendance: 49,000; Referee: Florian Badstübner

31 March 2024 27	FC Augsburg	1–1	1. FC Köln	Augsburg
15:30 CEST (UTC+2)	Maier 18'	Report	Selke 33'; Alidou (yellow card) 61'; Ljubičić (yellow card) 89'; Maina (yellow card) 89'	Stadium: WWK Arena; Attendance: 28,000; Referee: Sören Storks

6 April 2024 28	1. FC Köln	2–1	VfL Bochum	Cologne
15:30 CEST (UTC+2)	Martel (yellow card) 25'; Selke (yellow card) 37'; Thielmann (yellow card) 71'; Tigges 90+1'; Waldschmidt 90+2'	Report	Broschinski (yellow card) 35'; Passlack 53'; Asano (yellow card) 68'; Losilla (yellow card) 89'	Stadium: RheinEnergieStadion; Attendance: 50,000; Referee: Tobias Welz

13 April 2024 29	Bayern Munich	2–0	1. FC Köln	Munich
15:30 CEST (UTC+2)	Guerreiro 65'; Müller 90+3'	Report	Christensen (yellow card) 5'; Maina (yellow card) 30'; Adamyan (yellow card) 36'	Stadium: Allianz Arena; Attendance: 75,000; Referee: Frank Willenborg

20 April 2024 30	1. FC Köln	0–2	Darmstadt 98	Cologne
15:30 CEST (UTC+2)		Report	Klarer 57'; Holtmann (yellow card) 88'; Vilhelmsson 90+1'	Stadium: RheinEnergieStadion; Attendance: 50,000; Referee: Matthias Jöllenbeck

28 April 2024 31	Mainz 05	1–1	1. FC Köln	Mainz
17:30 CEST (UTC+2)	Caci (yellow card) 28'; Barreiro 29'; Hanche-Olsen (yellow card) 70'; Amiri (yellow card) 83'; Gruda (yellow card) 87'; Mwene (red card) 90+9'	Report	Alidou (yellow card) 28'; Waldschmidt (penalty missed) 48'; Chabot (yellow card) 66'; Uth (yellow card) 66'; Schmitz (yellow card) 76'; Kainz 90+5' (pen.)	Stadium: Mewa Arena; Attendance: 33,305; Referee: Benjamin Brand

4 May 2024 32	1. FC Köln	0–0	SC Freiburg	Cologne
18:30 CEST (UTC+2)	Finkgräfe (yellow card) 74'	Report	Kübler (yellow card) 51'	Stadium: RheinEnergieStadion; Attendance: 50,000; Referee: Sören Storks

11 May 2024 33	1. FC Köln	3–2	Union Berlin	Cologne
15:30 CEST (UTC+2)	Schmitz (yellow card) 36'; Kainz 45' (pen.); Martel (yellow card) 53'; Huseinbašić (yellow card) 74'; Tigges 87'; Downs 90+3'	Report	Knoche 15'; Volland 19' (pen.); Khedira (yellow card) 44'; Juranović (yellow card) 84'	Stadium: RheinEnergieStadion; Attendance: 50,000; Referee: Deniz Aytekin

18 May 2024 34	1. FC Heidenheim	4–1	1. FC Köln	Heidenheim
15:30 CEST (UTC+2)	Dinkçi 16', 22'; Sessa 36'; Kleindienst (yellow card) 76'; Beste 78'	Report	Kainz (yellow card) 30'; Hübers (yellow card) 52'; Tigges 64'; Maina (yellow card) 77'	Stadium: Voith-Arena; Attendance: 15,000; Referee: Tobias Welz

=== DFB-Pokal ===
14 August 2023 First round	VfL Osnabrück	1–3 (a.e.t.)	1. FC Köln	Osnabrück
20:45 CEST (UTC+2)	Conteh (yellow card) 25'; Kleinhansl (yellow card) 32'; Wriedt (yellow card) 45+1'; Makridis (penalty missed) 73', 73'	Report	Schmitz 43'; Chabot (yellow card) 45+1', (goal) 96'; Hübers (yellow card) 50'; Adamyan 93'	Stadium: Stadion an der Bremer Brücke; Attendance: 15,741; Referee: Florian Badstübner

31 October 2023 Second round	1. FC Kaiserslautern	3–2	1. FC Köln	Kaiserslautern
20:45 CET (UTC+1)	Tachie 19'; Redondo 47'; Ritter 65'; Elvedi (yellow card) 90+7'; Tomiak (yellow card) 90+8'	Report	Hübers (yellow card) 63'; Martel (yellow card) 69' (yellow-red card) 79'; Thielmann 71'; Uth 81'; Kainz (red card) 84'; Paqarada (yellow card) 88'	Stadium: Fritz-Walter-Stadion; Attendance: 49,327; Referee: Sven Jablonski

== Statistics ==
=== Appearances and goals ===
No.	Pos	Nat	Player	Total		Bundesliga		DFB-Pokal	
No.	Pos	Nat	Player	Apps	Goals	Apps	Goals	Apps	Goals
Goalkeepers
1	GK	(Germany) GER	Marvin Schwäbe	24	0	22	0	2	0
12	GK	(Germany) GER	Jonas Nickisch	0	0	0	0	0	0
20	GK	(Germany) GER	Philipp Pentke	0	0	0	0	0	0
44	GK	(Germany) GER	Matthias Köbbing	0	0	0	0	0	0
Defenders
2	DF	(Germany) GER	Benno Schmitz	16	1	10+4	0	2	1
3	DF	(Germany) GER	Dominique Heintz	8	0	5+3	0	0	0
4	DF	(Germany) GER	Timo Hübers	23	0	21	0	2	0
15	DF	(Germany) GER	Luca Kilian	12	0	4+7	0	0+1	0
17	DF	(Kosovo) KOS	Leart Paqarada	14	0	9+3	0	2	0
18	DF	(Denmark) DEN	Rasmus Carstensen	19	0	14+4	0	0+1	0
24	DF	(Germany) GER	Jeff Chabot	22	1	20	0	2	1
35	DF	(Germany) GER	Max Finkgräfe	13	1	8+5	1	0	0
38	DF	(Germany) GER	Elias Bakatukanda	0	0	0	0	0	0
Midfielders
6	MF	(Germany) GER	Eric Martel	21	0	19	0	2	0
7	MF	(Austria) AUT	Dejan Ljubicic	21	0	18+2	0	1	0
8	MF	(Bosnia and Herzegovina) BIH	Denis Huseinbasic	18	0	11+5	0	1+1	0
11	MF	(Austria) AUT	Florian Kainz	22	3	18+2	3	2	0
22	MF	(Denmark) DEN	Jacob Steen Christensen	5	0	0+4	0	0+1	0
37	MF	(Germany) GER	Linton Maina	20	1	14+5	1	1	0
Forwards
9	FW	(Germany) GER	Luca Waldschmidt	17	2	10+5	2	2	0
13	FW	(Germany) GER	Mark Uth	9	1	3+4	0	0+2	1
21	FW	(Germany) GER	Steffen Tigges	15	0	4+10	0	0+1	0
23	FW	(Armenia) ARM	Sargis Adamyan	10	1	0+9	0	0+1	1
29	FW	(Germany) GER	Jan Thielmann	14	2	11+2	1	0+1	1
27	FW	(Germany) GER	Davie Selke	17	5	14+1	5	2	0
33	FW	(Germany) GER	Florian Dietz	4	0	0+4	0	0	0
40	FW	(Germany) GER	Faride Alidou	14	2	4+10	2	0	0
42	FW	(Germany) GER	Damion Downs	3	0	0+3	0	0	0
45	FW	(Germany) GER	Justin Diehl	4	0	0+4	0	0	0
Players transferred out during the season
3	DF	(Denmark) DEN	Kristian Pedersen	0	0	0	0	0	0
19	MF	(Greece) GRE	Dimitrios Limnios	0	0	0	0	0	0
30	DF	(Germany) GER	Noah Katterbach	0	0	0	0	0	0
47	MF	(Luxembourg) LUX	Mathias Olesen	7	0	0+6	0	1	0

Last updated: 16 February 2024
Source: Competitions

=== Goalscorers ===
As of 24 February 2023

Rank	Pos.	No.	Nat.	Player	Bundesliga	DFB-Pokal	Total
1	FW	27	(Germany)	Davie Selke	5	0	5
2	MF	11	(Austria)	Florian Kainz	3	0	3
3	FW	9	(Germany)	Luca Waldschmidt	2	0	2
3	FW	40	(Germany)	Faride Alidou	2	0	2
3	FW	29	(Germany)	Jan Thielmann	1	1	2
6	MF	37	(Germany)	Linton Maina	1	0	1
6	DF	35	(Germany)	Max Finkgräfe	1	0	1
6	DF	2	(Germany)	Benno Schmitz	0	1	1
6	FW	23	(Armenia)	Sargis Adamyan	0	1	1
6	DF	24	(Germany)	Jeff Chabot	0	1	1
6	FW	13	(Germany)	Mark Uth	0	1	1
6	MF	6	(Germany)	Eric Martel	1	0	1
Own goals					0	0	0
Totals					16	5	21
