= Denis Huseinbašić =

Bosnian footballer (born 2001)

- Huseinbašić in 2026

Personal information
- Date of birth: 3 July 2001 (age 25)
- Place of birth: Erbach im Odenwald, Germany
- Height: 1.84 m (6 ft 0 in)
- Position: Midfielder

Team information
- Current team: Braga
- Number: 23

Youth career
- 2007–2011: FSV Erbach
- 2011–2013: SV Darmstadt
- 2013–2018: Eintracht Frankfurt
- 2018–2020: Kickers Offenbach

Senior career*
Years	Team	Apps	(Gls)
2020–2022	Kickers Offenbach	58	(9)
2022–2026	1. FC Köln	96	(7)
2026–	Braga	6	(0)

International career^{‡}
2022–2023	Germany U21	5	(2)
2024–	Bosnia and Herzegovina	7	(0)
- * Club domestic league appearances and goals as of 1 November 2026 ‡ National team caps and goals as of 16 November 2024

Denis Huseinbašić (pronounced [dêːnis xǔseinbaʃitɕ]; born 3 July 2001) is a professional footballer who plays as a midfielder for Primeira Liga club Braga. Born in Germany, he plays for the Bosnia and Herzegovina national team.

Huseinbašić started his professional career at Kickers Offenbach, before joining 1. FC Köln in 2022. Four years later, he moved to Braga.

A former German youth international, Huseinbašić made his senior international debut for Bosnia and Herzegovina in 2024.

== Club career ==
=== Early career ===
Huseinbašić started playing football at his hometown club FSV Erbach before joining the youth setup of SV Darmstadt in 2011. Two years later, he moved to Eintracht Frankfurt's youth academy. In 2018, he switched to the youth setup of Kickers Offenbach.

He scored his first career hat-trick in a triumph over FSV Frankfurt on 14 May 2022.

=== 1. FC Köln ===
In June, Huseinbašić signed a three-year deal with 1. FC Köln. He made his professional debut against VfL Wolfsburg on 3 September at the age of 21. On 9 October, he scored his first professional goal against Borussia Mönchengladbach.

In May 2024, he signed a new long-term contract with the team.

Huseinbašić was an important piece in 1. FC Köln's capture of the 2. Bundesliga title, his first trophy with the club, which was secured on 18 May 2025 and earned them promotion to the Bundesliga just one season after being relegated.

He played his 100th game for the squad against Hamburger SV on 2 November.

=== Braga ===
In June 2026, Huseinbašić was transferred to Portuguese side Braga. He made his official debut for the team in a UEFA Conference League qualifier against Železničar Pančevo on 22 July. Two weeks later, he made his league debut against Moreirense.

== International career ==
Despite representing Germany at the under-21 level, Huseinbašić decided to play for Bosnia and Herzegovina at the senior level.

In February 2024, his request to change sports citizenship from German to Bosnian was approved by FIFA. Subsequently, in March, he received his first senior call up, for the UEFA Euro 2024 qualifying play-offs against Ukraine, but had to wait until 3 June to make his debut in a friendly game against England.

== Career statistics ==
=== Club ===
As of match played 1 November 2026

Appearances and goals by club, season and competition
Club	Season	League			National cup (Note: Includes DFB-Pokal)		Continental		Total	
Club	Season	Division	Apps	Goals	Apps	Goals	Apps	Goals	Apps	Goals
Kickers Offenbach	2020–21	Regionalliga Südwest	25	5	–		–		25	5
Kickers Offenbach	2021–22	Regionalliga Südwest	33	4	–		–		33	4
Kickers Offenbach	Total		58	9	–		–		58	9
1. FC Köln	2022–23	Bundesliga	24	4	0	0	5 (Note: Appearances in UEFA Conference League)	1	29	5
1. FC Köln	2023–24	Bundesliga	26	0	2	0	–		28	0
1. FC Köln	2024–25	2. Bundesliga	31	3	4	0	–		35	3
1. FC Köln	2025–26	Bundesliga	15	0	1	0	–		16	0
1. FC Köln	Total		96	7	7	0	5	1	108	8
Braga	2026–27	Primeira Liga	6	0	0	0	7	0	13	0
Career total			160	16	7	0	12	1	179	17

=== International ===
As of match played 16 November 2024

Appearances and goals by national team and year
National team	Year	Apps	Goals
Bosnia and Herzegovina
Bosnia and Herzegovina	2024	7	0
Total		7	0

== Honours ==
1. FC Köln

- 2. Bundesliga: 2024–25
