= Luca Waldschmidt =

German footballer (born 1996)

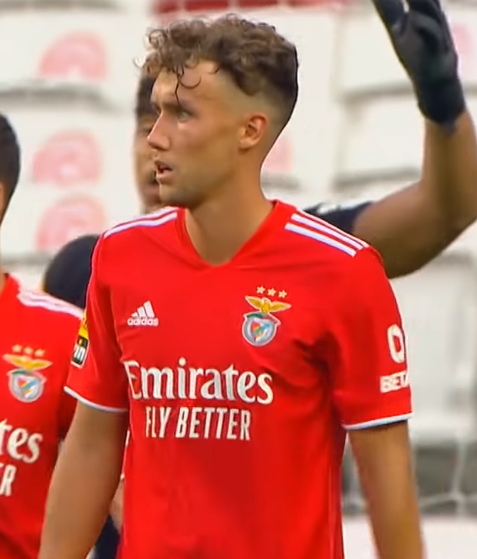
- Waldschmidt with Benfica in 2021

Personal information
- Full name: Gian-Luca Waldschmidt
- Date of birth: 19 May 1996 (age 30)
- Place of birth: Siegen, Germany
- Height: 1.81 m (5 ft 11 in)
- Position: Forward

Team information
- Current team: 1. FC Köln
- Number: 7

Youth career
- 2001–2007: SSV Oranien Frohnhausen
- 2007–2009: SSC Juno Burg
- 2009–2010: TSG Wieseck
- 2010–2014: Eintracht Frankfurt

Senior career*
Years	Team	Apps	(Gls)
2014	Eintracht Frankfurt II	2	(1)
2014–2016	Eintracht Frankfurt	15	(0)
2016–2018	Hamburger SV	35	(2)
2018–2020	SC Freiburg	53	(16)
2020–2021	Benfica	29	(9)
2021–2024	VfL Wolfsburg	32	(5)
2023–2024	→ 1. FC Köln (loan)	22	(3)
2024–	1. FC Köln	58	(13)

International career^{‡}
2011–2012	Germany U16	2	(3)
2012–2013	Germany U17	8	(4)
2014–2017	Germany U18	1	(0)
2013	Germany U19	1	(0)
2017–2019	Germany U21	15	(10)
2019–2020	Germany	7	(2)
Medal record
UEFA European Under-21 Championship
Runner-up	2019
- * Club domestic league appearances and goals as of 24 October 2026 ‡ National team caps and goals as of 21:39, 17 November 2020 (UTC)

Gian-Luca Waldschmidt (born 19 May 1996) is a German professional footballer who plays as a forward for Bundesliga club 1. FC Köln. He developed through the academy of Eintracht Frankfurt and has represented Germany at various levels, including the senior national team.

== Club career ==
=== Eintracht Frankfurt ===
A forward, Waldschmidt began his youth career in 2001 with SSV Oranien Frohnhausen and had youth spells at SSC Juno Burg and TSG Wieseck before joining the Eintracht Frankfurt academy in 2010.

On 25 April 2014, Waldschmidt signed his first professional contract, a three-year deal. This saw him promoted to the first team, although he would still appear for the under-19 team. Exactly one year later, on 25 April 2015, Waldschmidt made his Bundesliga debut, as a 73rd-minute substitute for Sonny Kittel in a 0–2 home loss to Borussia Dortmund. He scored his first goal for Eintracht Frankfurt on 8 August in a 3–0 win over Bremer SV in the first round of the German cup.

=== Hamburger SV ===
On 30 June 2016, Waldschmidt signed for Hamburger SV on a four-year contract. He made his first appearance for the Hamburg club in the Bundesliga in a 0–4 home loss to RB Leipzig on 17 September, coming on as a substitute in the 83rd minute, replacing Bobby Wood. He scored his first goal for the club a few seconds after coming on, in a 4–0 win over Hallescher FC on 24 October, in a second-round cup fixture. On 20 May 2017, the last round of the 2016–17 Bundesliga season, Waldschmidt scored his first Bundesliga-goal, the decisive goal in a 2–1 win over relegation rivals VfL Wolfsburg, in the 88th minute – two minutes after being substituted in. The goal meant that Hamburger SV avoided Bundesliga relegation play-offs for the first time in four years. In the following season, Waldschmidt made 21 league appearances in which he scored one goal. At the end of the season, Hamburger SV were relegated to the 2. Bundesliga for the first time in the Bundesliga's 55-year history.

=== SC Freiburg ===
In May 2018, SC Freiburg announced they had signed Waldschmidt for the 2018–19 season from Hamburger SV, newly relegated to the 2. Bundesliga. The club reportedly triggered a €5 million release clause. He finished his first campaign for the club with 30 appearances and nine goals.

=== Benfica ===
On 14 August 2020, Benfica announced the signing of Waldschmidt on a five-year deal for 15 million euros. Waldschmidt scored twice on his Benfica debut, a 5–1 Primeira Liga win over Famalicão on 18 September 2020.

=== VfL Wolfsburg ===
On 22 August 2021, Waldschmidt returned to Germany, signing a four-year contract with VfL Wolfsburg.

=== 1. FC Köln ===
In July 2023, Waldschmidt joined 1. FC Köln on a one-year loan. On 19 June 2024, it was announced that he had signed for the club on a permanent basis.

== International career ==
Waldschmidt has represented the Germany national youth football teams (U16 to U21). He finished as the top scorer of the 2019 UEFA European Under-21 Championship with seven goals, breaking the previous record of his compatriot, Pierre Littbarski, who scored six goals in the 1982 UEFA European Under-21 Championship.

On 29 August 2019, Waldschmidt was called up to Germany's UEFA Euro 2020 qualifiers against Netherlands and Czech Republic. The same year on 9 October, he debuted for the German senior squad in a friendly match against Argentina, playing the whole match. On 7 October 2020, Waldschmidt scored his first senior international goal in a friendly match against Turkey.

== Personal life ==
Luca Waldschmidt is the son of Wolfgang Waldschmidt, who made 14 appearances for SV Darmstadt 98 in the 1983–84 2. Bundesliga season.

== Career statistics ==
=== Club ===
As of match played 24 October 2026

Appearances and goals by club, season and competition
Club	Season	League			National cup (Note: Includes DFB-Pokal, Taça de Portugal)		League cup (Note: Includes Taça da Liga)		Europe		Other		Total	
Club	Season	Division	Apps	Goals	Apps	Goals	Apps	Goals	Apps	Goals	Apps	Goals	Apps	Goals
Eintracht Frankfurt II	2013–14	Regionalliga Südwest	2	1	—		—		—		—		2	1
Eintracht Frankfurt	2014–15	Bundesliga	3	0	0	0	—		—		—		3	0
Eintracht Frankfurt	2015–16	Bundesliga	12	0	2	1	—		—		—		14	1
Eintracht Frankfurt	Total		15	0	2	1	—		—		—		17	1
Hamburger SV	2016–17	Bundesliga	14	1	2	1	—		—		—		16	2
Hamburger SV	2017–18	Bundesliga	21	1	1	0	—		—		—		22	1
Hamburger SV	Total		35	2	3	1	—		—		—		38	3
Hamburger SV II	2016–17	Regionalliga Nord	5	4	—		—		—		—		5	4
Hamburger SV II	2017–18	Regionalliga Nord	1	0	—		—		—		—		1	0
Hamburger SV II	Total		6	4	—		—		—		—		6	4
SC Freiburg	2018–19	Bundesliga	30	9	2	0	—		—		—		32	9
SC Freiburg	2019–20	Bundesliga	22	5	1	1	—		—		—		23	6
SC Freiburg	Total		52	14	3	1	—		—		—		55	15
Benfica	2020–21	Primeira Liga	27	7	4	2	1	0	8 (Note: Appearances in UEFA Europa League)	1	1 (Note: Appearance in Supertaça Cândido de Oliveira)	0	41	10
Benfica	2021–22	Primeira Liga	2	2	0	0	0	0	0	0	—		2	2
Benfica	Total		29	9	4	2	1	0	8	1	1	0	43	12
VfL Wolfsburg	2021–22	Bundesliga	14	1	—		—		3 (Note: Appearances in UEFA Champions League)	0	—		17	1
VfL Wolfsburg	2022–23	Bundesliga	18	4	2	1	—		—		—		20	5
VfL Wolfsburg	Total		32	5	2	1	—		3	0	—		37	6
1. FC Köln (loan)	2023–24	Bundesliga	22	3	2	0	—		—		—		24	3
1. FC Köln	2024–25	2. Bundesliga	30	8	3	2	—		—		—		33	10
1. FC Köln	2025–26	Bundesliga	24	5	2	0	—		—		—		26	5
1. FC Köln	2026–27	Bundesliga	4	0	0	0	—		—		—		4	0
1. FC Köln	Total		80	16	7	2	—		3	0	—		87	18
Career total			251	51	21	8	1	0	11	1	1	0	285	58

=== International ===
As of match played 17 November 2020

Appearances and goals by national team and year
National team	Year	Apps	Goals
Germany
Germany	2019	3	0
Germany	2020	4	2
Total		7	2

As of match played 11 November 2020. Scores and results list Germany's goal tally first.

List of international goals scored by Luca Waldschmidt
No.	Date	Venue	Opponent	Score	Result	Competition
1	7 October 2020	RheinEnergieStadion, Cologne, Germany	Turkey	3–2	3–3	Friendly
2	11 November 2020	Red Bull Arena, Leipzig, Germany	Czech Republic	1–0	1–0	Friendly

== Honours ==
1.FC Koln

- 2.Bundesliga: 2024–25

Germany U21

- UEFA European Under-21 Championship runner-up: 2019

Individual

- UEFA European Under-21 Championship Golden Boot: 2019
- UEFA European Under-21 Championship Team of the Tournament: 2019
