= Eric Martel =

German footballer

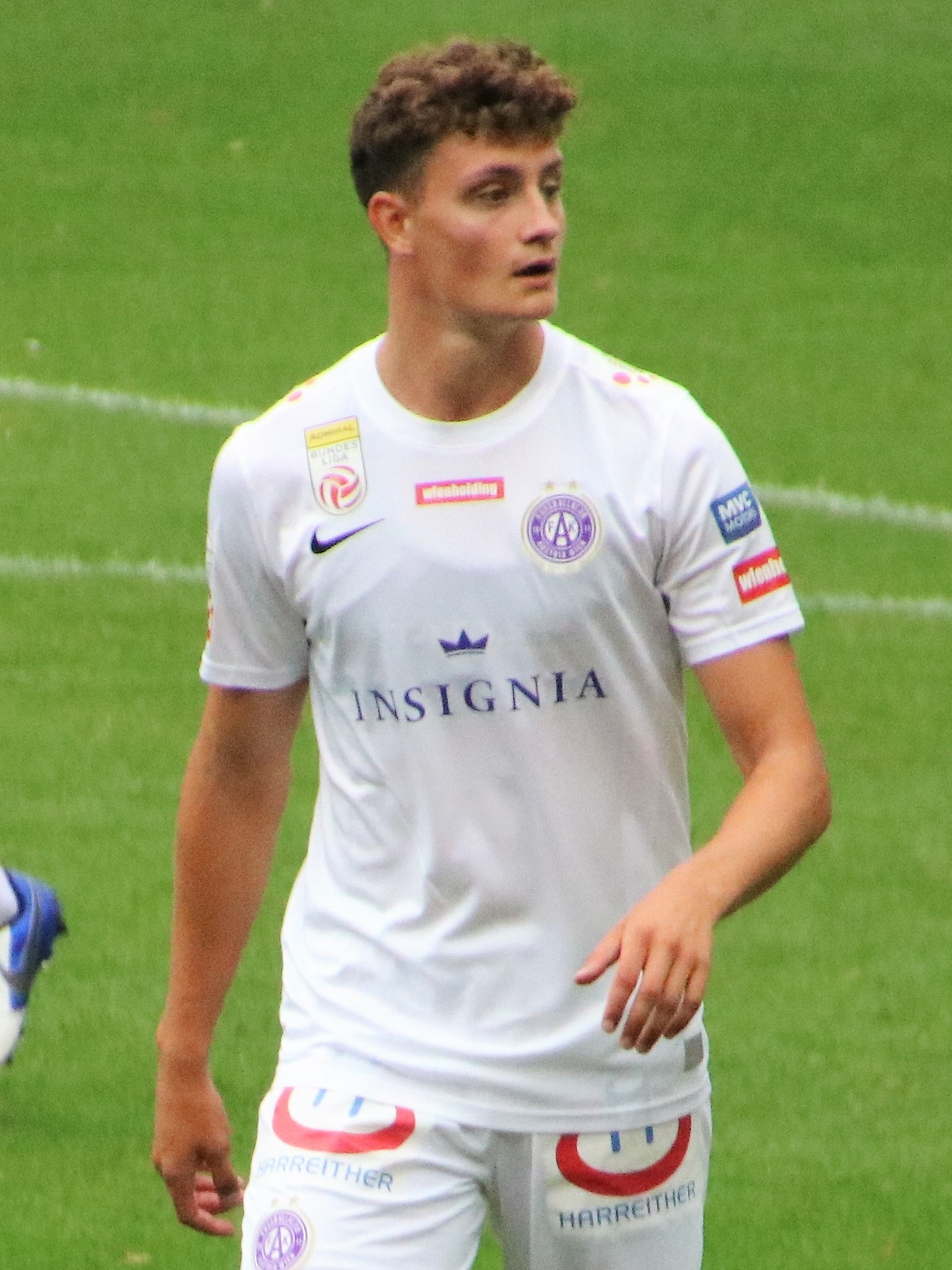
- Martel in 2021

Personal information
- Date of birth: 29 April 2002 (age 24)
- Place of birth: Straubing, Germany
- Height: 1.88 m (6 ft 2 in)
- Positions: Centre-back; defensive midfielder

Team information
- Current team: Mainz 05
- Number: 5

Youth career
- 2015–2017: Jahn Regensburg
- 2017–2020: RB Leipzig

Senior career*
Years	Team	Apps	(Gls)
2020–2022	RB Leipzig	0	(0)
2021–2022	→ Austria Wien (loan)	51	(3)
2022–2026	1. FC Köln	121	(6)
2026–	Mainz 05	5	(1)

International career^{‡}
2020	Germany U19	1	(0)
2021	Germany U20	3	(0)
2021–2025	Germany U21	30	(3)
Medal record
Men's football
Representing Germany
UEFA European Under-21 Championship
Runner-up	2025 Slovakia
- * Club domestic league appearances and goals as of 30 October 2026 ‡ National team caps and goals as of 10:11, 29 June 2025 (UTC)

Eric Martel (born 29 April 2002) is a German professional footballer who plays as a centre-back and defensive midfielder for Bundesliga club Mainz 05.

== Career ==
Martel made his professional debut for RB Leipzig in the second round of the 2020–21 DFB-Pokal on 22 December 2020, coming on as a substitute in the 88th minute for Dayot Upamecano against Bundesliga side FC Augsburg. The away match finished as a 3–0 win.

On 24 June 2022, it was announced that Martel would transfer to 1. FC Köln, where he signed a four-year deal.

On 19 May 2026, Martel signed with Mainz 05.

== Career statistics ==
As of match played 30 October 2026

Appearances and goals by club, season and competition
Club	Season	League			National cup (Note: Includes Austrian Cup, DFB-Pokal)		Europe		Other		Total	
Club	Season	Division	Apps	Goals	Apps	Goals	Apps	Goals	Apps	Goals	Apps	Goals
RB Leipzig	2020–21	Bundesliga	0	0	1	0	0	0	0	0	1	0
Austria Wien (loan)	2020–21	Austrian Bundesliga	21	1	1	0	0	0	—		22	1
Austria Wien (loan)	2021–22	Austrian Bundesliga	30	2	2	1	2 (Note: Appearances in UEFA Europa Conference League)	0	—		34	3
Austria Wien (loan)	Total		51	3	3	1	2	0	—		56	4
1. FC Köln	2022–23	Bundesliga	29	1	0	0	6	0	—		35	1
1. FC Köln	2023–24	Bundesliga	30	1	2	0	—		—		32	1
1. FC Köln	2024–25	2. Bundesliga	31	3	3	0	—		—		34	3
1. FC Köln	2025–26	Bundesliga	31	1	2	1	—		—		33	2
1. FC Köln	Total		121	6	7	1	6	0	—		134	7
Mainz 05	2026–27	Bundesliga	5	1	1	0	—		—		6	1
Career total			177	10	12	2	8	0	0	0	197	12

== Honours ==
1.FC Koln

- 2. Bundesliga: 2024–25

Germany U21

- UEFA European Under-21 Championship runner-up: 2025

Individual

- UEFA European Under-21 Championship Team of the Tournament: 2025
