= Florian Dietz =

German footballer

Personal information
- Date of birth: 3 August 1998 (age 28)
- Place of birth: Bad Neustadt an der Saale, Germany
- Height: 1.88 m (6 ft 2 in)
- Position: Forward

Team information
- Current team: Jahn Regensburg
- Number: 13

Youth career
- FC Strahlungen
- –2013: TSV Großbardorf
- 2013–2017: Carl Zeiss Jena

Senior career*
Years	Team	Apps	(Gls)
2016–2018	Carl Zeiss Jena	34	(3)
2016–2018	Carl Zeiss Jena II	7	(4)
2018–2019	Werder Bremen II	26	(5)
2019–2021	SpVgg Unterhaching	20	(0)
2020–2021	→ 1. FC Köln II (loan)	12	(4)
2021–2022	1. FC Köln II	28	(17)
2022–2025	1. FC Köln	19	(1)
2025	→ Rheindorf Altach (loan)	7	(2)
2025–	Jahn Regensburg	24	(2)
- * Club domestic league appearances and goals as of 14:31, 26 September 2026 (UTC)

Florian Dietz (born 3 August 1998) is a German professional footballer who plays as a forward for 3. Liga club Jahn Regensburg.

Dietz played with the youth teams of FC Strahlungen and TSV Großbardorf, before signing for Carl Zeiss Jena. He made his senior debut with them in 2016, and broke through in the 2017–18 season. He left for Werder Bremen II the following season. He then moved to SpVgg Unterhaching in 2019, but was loaned to 1. FC Köln II the following year. The move was made permanent in 2021. He was promoted to the first team in 2022. He was loaned to Austrian side Rheindorf Altach in 2025.

== Career ==
=== Early career ===
Dietz started with the youth team of FC Strahlungen, before joining TSV Großbardorf's youth ranks. He left for Regionalliga Nordost team Carl Zeiss Jena in 2013. Moving up the youth ranks, he was promoted to the first team in the 2016–17 season. He made his first team debut in a Regionalliga match on 23 September 2016, in a 3–0 victory against Hertha BSC II. He made his breakthrough the next season in the 3. Liga, making 26 appearances and scoring an injury time winner in a 1–0 win in the Thuringia derby.

=== Werder Bremen ===
Dietz left at the start of the 2018–19 season, joining SV Werder Bremen II of the Regionalliga Nord along with his younger brother Leo. He scored on his debut in a 2–0 victory against SV Drochtersen on 26 August 2018. Over the course of the season, he played 23 matches and scored 3 goals. Dietz started the 2019–20 season by scoring in a 1–0 victory against Lüneburger SK Hansa on 27 July 2019. However, he was soon signed by 3. Liga side SpVgg Unterhaching on a 3 year contract.

=== Unterhaching ===
Dietz made his Unterhaching debut on 21 September 2019, in a 2–0 win over Sonnenhof Großaspach. Dietz scored his only goal with Unterhaching on 11 October 2019 in the Bavarian Cup against 1860 Munich in a 1–1 draw that Unterhaching lost on penalties. He made 20 appearances without scoring in the league for the 2019-20 season.

=== Köln ===
Dietz was loaned to 1. FC Köln II the next season. He made his debut for the reserves on 12 September 2020, in a 2–1 loss against Borussia Dortmund II. He scored his first 2 goals on 18 October 2020, in a 4–0 win against Rot-Weiß Oberhausen. On 4 November 2020, Dietz suffered an ACL injury against Straelen, meaning he could not play for at least 6 months. He was permanently signed at the start of the 2021 season. He made his return 9 months after his injury on 15 August 2021, in a 2–1 victory against Schalke II.

Following 13 goals in the 2021–22 season, Dietz was promoted to the club's first team in mid 2022, signing a professional contract until 2025. He made his Bundesliga debut on 7 August 2022 in a 3–1 victory against Schalke. He scored his first Bundesliga goal the next match on 13 August, in a 2–2 draw against RB Leipzig. Dietz also scored the next match on 18 August in a Conference League qualifier 2–1 loss against Fehérvár. However, on 30 October in a match against Hoffenheim, Dietz was substituted off for Sargis Adamyan after only being on the pitch for a few minutes following a tackle by Ozan Kabak. After an MRI Scan, it was announced that he once again suffered another ACL injury and that he would be out for the rest of the season. He returned to the reserves during his latter part of his convalescence period, scoring 4 goals in 9 games in the Regionalliga West. After over a year, Dietz made his first Bundesliga appearance since being injured on 10 December 2023, in a 0–0 draw against Mainz 05. There was interest from 3. Liga side Rot-Weiss Essen to loan Dietz in the winter transfer window but ultimately Dietz decided to stay with Köln.

Following Köln's relegation to the 2. Bundesliga, it was announced that Dietz's contract was extended by an undisclosed amount. However, Dietz struggled for gametime in the 2. Bundesliga, only making 3 short cameos in the first half of the season. He was therefore loaned to Austrian Bundesliga side Rheindorf Altach on 5 January 2025. Dietz made his Altach league debut on 8 February, starting in a 2–1 defeat to Grazer AK. He scored his first goal on 15 February in a 3–1 win against Blau-Weiß Linz.

=== Jahn Regensburg ===
On 26 August 2025, Dietz signed a two-year contract with Jahn Regensburg in 3. Liga.

== Career statistics ==
As of match played 26 September 2026

Appearances and goals by club, season and competition
Club	Season	League			National cup (Note: Includes DFB-Pokal)		Europe		Other		Total	
Club	Season	Division	Apps	Goals	Apps	Goals	Apps	Goals	Apps	Goals	Apps	Goals
Carl Zeiss Jena	2016–17	Regionalliga Nordost	8	2	0	0	—		0	0	8	2
Carl Zeiss Jena	2017–18	3. Liga	26	1	—		—		4 (Note: Appearances in Thuringian Cup)	6	30	7
Carl Zeiss Jena	Total		34	3	0	0	—		4	6	38	9
Werder Bremen II	2018–19	Regionalliga Nord	22	3	—		—		—		22	3
Werder Bremen II	2019–20	Regionalliga Nord	4	2	—		—		—		4	2
Werder Bremen II	Total		26	5	—		—		—		26	5
SpVgg Unterhaching	2019–20	3. Liga	20	0	—		—		3 (Note: Appearances in Bavarian Cup)	1	23	1
1. FC Köln II (loan)	2020–21	Regionalliga West	12	0	—		—		—		12	0
1. FC Köln II	2021–22	Regionalliga West	18	13	—		—		—		18	13
1. FC Köln II	2022–23	Regionalliga West	1	0	—		—		—		1	0
1. FC Köln II	2023–24	Regionalliga West	9	4	—		—		—		9	4
1. FC Köln II	Total		28	17	—		—		—		28	17
1. FC Köln	2022–23	Bundesliga	11	1	0	0	7 (Note: Appearances in UEFA Europa Conference League)	2	—		18	3
1. FC Köln	2023–24	Bundesliga	5	0	0	0	—		—		5	0
1. FC Köln	2024–25	2. Bundesliga	3	0	1	0	—		—		4	0
1. FC Köln	Total		19	1	1	0	7	2	—		27	3
Rheindorf Altach (loan)	2024–25	Austrian Bundesliga	7	2	0	0	—		—		7	2
SSV Jahn Regensburg	2025–26	3. Liga	24	2	0	0	—		—		24	2
SSV Jahn Regensburg	2026–27	3. Liga	0	0	—		—		—		0	0
SSV Jahn Regensburg	Total		24	2	0	0	—		—		24	2
Career total			170	30	1	0	7	2	7	7	185	39
