= Florian Kainz =

Austrian footballer (born 1992)

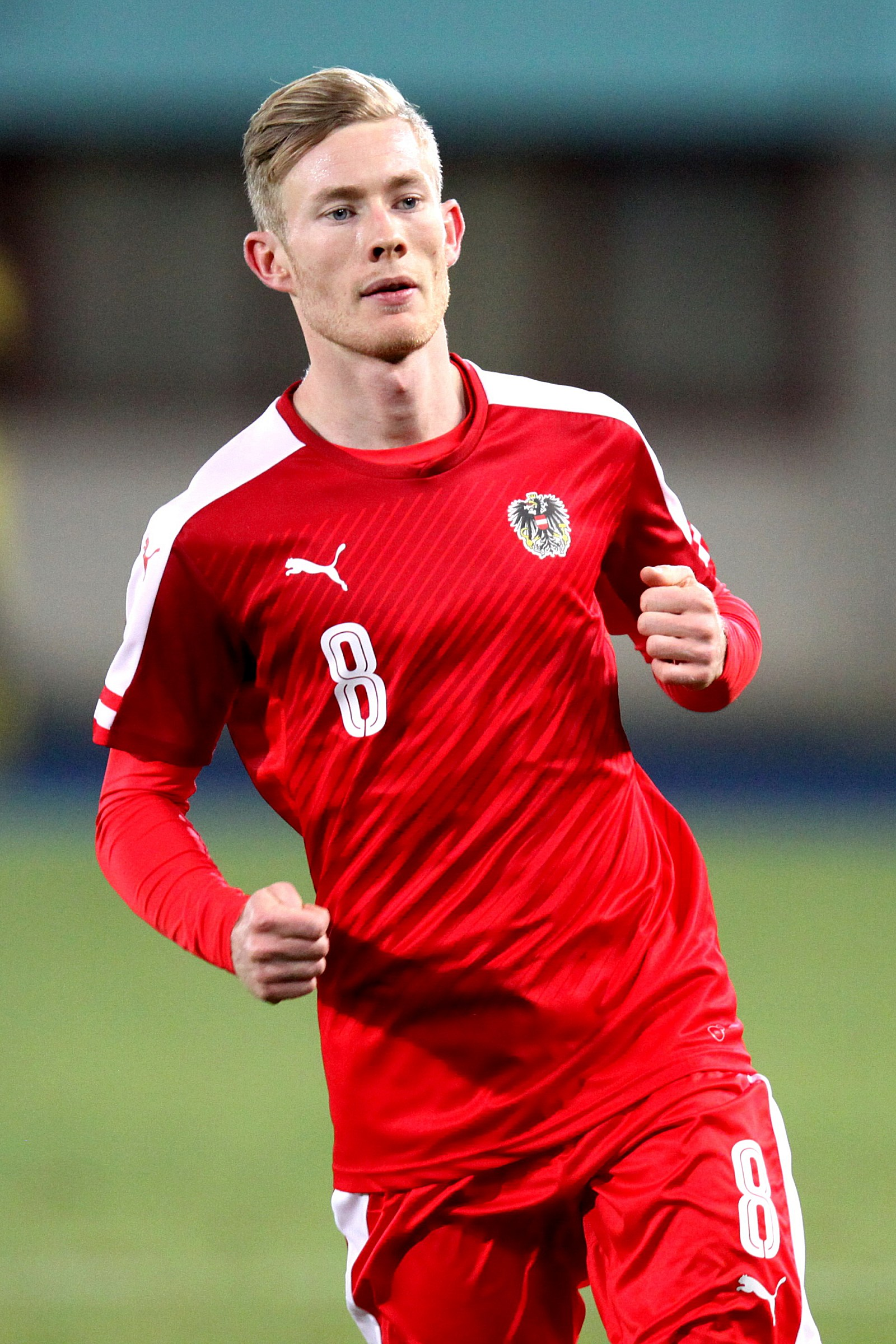
- Kainz with Austria in 2015

Personal information
- Date of birth: 24 October 1992 (age 34)
- Place of birth: Graz, Austria
- Height: 1.76 m (5 ft 9 in)
- Position: Midfielder

Youth career
- Sturm Graz

Senior career*
Years	Team	Apps	(Gls)
2010–2014	Sturm Graz	98	(15)
2014–2016	Rapid Wien	65	(11)
2016–2019	Werder Bremen	52	(5)
2019–2026	1. FC Köln	189	(27)

International career
2010	Austria U18	2	(0)
2010	Austria U19	5	(0)
2011–2014	Austria U21	17	(1)
2015–2024	Austria	28	(1)
- * Club domestic league appearances and goals

Florian Kainz (German pronunciation: [ˈfloːʁi̯aːn ˈkaɪnts]; born 24 October 1992) is an Austrian former professional footballer who played as a midfielder.

== Club career ==
In July 2014, after more than a decade with Sturm Graz, Graz native Kainz transferred to Rapid Wien for an undisclosed fee. He signed for Rapid until summer 2017.

In June 2016, Kainz joined Werder Bremen on a four-year contract for a reported €3.5 million transfer fee. On 18 March 2017, he scored his first goal for the club in a 3–0 win against Leipzig. Having been introduced as a substitute in the 88th minute he found the net two minutes later in a match that saw all three of Werder Bremen's Austrian players score in the club's highest win of the season. Two matches later he assisted the last goal in Werder Bremen's 5–2 away victory against Freiburg via free kick, after being brought onto the pitch in the 76th minute.

In the first match of the 2018–19 season, a 6–1 win against Wormatia Worms in the first round of the DFB-Pokal, Kainz assisted the first goal and scored the second in a "Man of the Match" performance.

In January 2019, Kainz joined 1. FC Köln on a three-and-a-half-year contract. The transfer fee paid to Werder Bremen was reported as €3 million. In March 2022, he signed a new contract until 2024. In January 2023, he extended his contract until 2025. He became club's captain ahead of the 2023–24 season, following Jonas Hector's retirement.

In March 2026, Kainz announced that he would end his professional career at the end of the 2025–26 season. On 16 May 2026, Kainz played his last professional match against Bayern Munich.

== International career ==
In November 2015, Kainz debuted for the Austrian senior squad during a friendly match against Switzerland, coming as a substitute. He scored his first and only goal in a UEFA Euro 2024 qualifying against Estonia.

== Career statistics ==
=== Club ===
Appearances and goals by club, season and competition
Club	Season	League			National cup (Note: Includes Austrian Cup, DFB-Pokal)		Europe		Other		Total	
Club	Season	Division	Apps	Goals	Apps	Goals	Apps	Goals	Apps	Goals	Apps	Goals
Sturm Graz	2010–11	Austrian Bundesliga	13	2	3	0	2 (Note: Appearances in UEFA Europa League)	0	—		18	2
Sturm Graz	2011–12	Austrian Bundesliga	25	3	2	2	8 (Note: Three appearances in UEFA Champions League, five appearances and two goals in UEFA Europa League)	2	—		35	7
Sturm Graz	2012–13	Austrian Bundesliga	26	3	2	0	—		—		28	3
Sturm Graz	2013–14	Austrian Bundesliga	33	7	5	2	2	0	—		40	9
Sturm Graz	2014–15	Austrian Bundesliga	1	0	—		—		—		1	0
Sturm Graz	Total		98	15	12	4	12	2	—		122	21
Rapid Wien	2014–15	Austrian Bundesliga	32	4	3	0	2	0	—		37	4
Rapid Wien	2015–16	Austrian Bundesliga	33	7	3	3	11 (Note: Four appearances and one goal in UEFA Champions League, seven appearances in UEFA Europa League)	1	—		47	11
Rapid Wien	Total		65	11	6	3	13	1	—		84	15
Werder Bremen	2016–17	Bundesliga	14	2	1	0	—		—		15	2
Werder Bremen	2017–18	Bundesliga	30	3	4	1	—		—		34	4
Werder Bremen	2018–19	Bundesliga	8	0	2	2	—		—		10	2
Werder Bremen	Total		52	5	7	3	—		—		59	8
1. FC Köln	2018–19	2. Bundesliga	14	0	1	1	—		—		15	1
1. FC Köln	2019–20	Bundesliga	28	5	1	1	—		—		29	6
1. FC Köln	2020–21	Bundesliga	8	1	0	0	—		1	0	9	1
1. FC Köln	2021–22	Bundesliga	32	4	2	0	—		—		34	4
1. FC Köln	2022–23	Bundesliga	32	6	1	0	7 (Note: Appearances in UEFA Europa Conference League)	0	—		40	6
1. FC Köln	2023–24	Bundesliga	33	5	2	0	0	0	—		35	5
1. FC Köln	2024–25	2. Bundesliga	27	5	1	0	—		—		28	5
1. FC Köln	2025–26	Bundesliga	15	1	2	0	—		—		17	1
1. FC Köln	Total		189	26	10	2	7	0	1	0	207	29
Career total			404	58	35	11	32	3	1	0	482	73

=== International ===
Appearances and goals by national team and year
National team	Year	Apps	Goals
Austria	2015	1	0
Austria	2017	5	0
Austria	2018	7	0
Austria	2019	3	0
Austria	2021	4	0
Austria	2022	1	0
Austria	2023	6	1
Austria	2024	1	0
Total		28	1

Scores and results list Austria's goal tally first, score column indicates score after each Kainz goal.

List of international goals scored by Florian Kainz
No.	Date	Venue	Opponent	Score	Result	Competition
1	27 March 2023	Raiffeisen Arena, Linz, Austria	Estonia	1–1	2–1	UEFA Euro 2024 qualification

== Honours ==
1.FC Koln

- 2.Bundesliga: 2024–25

Individual

- Austrian Bundesliga top assist provider: 2015–16
