= Damion Downs =

Soccer player (born 2004)

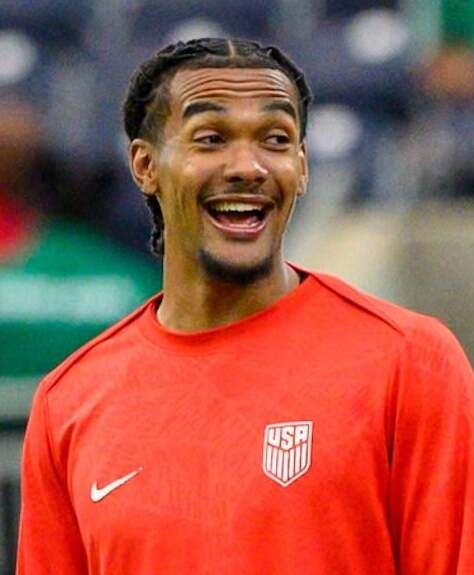
- Downs with the United States in 2025

Personal information
- Full name: Damion Lamar Downs
- Date of birth: July 6, 2004 (age 22)
- Place of birth: Werneck, Germany
- Height: 1.92 m (6 ft 4 in)
- Position: Striker

Team information
- Current team: St. Louis City (on loan from Southampton)
- Number: 42

Youth career
- 1. FC Schweinfurt 05
- 2018–2020: FC Ingolstadt
- 2020–2023: 1. FC Köln

Senior career*
Years	Team	Apps	(Gls)
2023–2024	1. FC Köln II	22	(7)
2023–2025	1. FC Köln	39	(12)
2025–	Southampton	11	(0)
2026	→ Hamburger SV (loan)	12	(0)
2026–	→ St. Louis City (loan)	10	(0)

International career^{‡}
2024	Germany U20	6	(2)
2025–	United States U23	1	(0)
2025–	United States	7	(0)
Medal record
Representing United States
Men's football
CONCACAF Gold Cup
Runner-up	2025 Canada–United States
- * Club domestic league appearances and goals as of 06:03, November 8, 2026 (UTC) ‡ National team caps and goals as of September 29, 2026

Damion Lamar Downs (born July 6, 2004) is a professional soccer player who plays as a striker for Major League Soccer club St. Louis City, on loan from EFL Championship club Southampton. Born in Germany, he represents the United States national team.

== Early life ==
Downs was born in Germany to an African American father and German mother. When he was one year old, he and his family moved to the United States where he was raised in Texas for much of his childhood, played American football, and adopted English as his first language. Downs did not play soccer until nine years old when he moved back to Germany.

== Club career ==
=== 1. FC Köln ===
Downs is a youth product of 1. FC Schweinfurt 05 and FC Ingolstadt. On September 28, 2020, he joined the youth academy of 1. FC Köln. He was promoted to 1. FC Köln II in 2023, and signed his first professional contract with the club on May 2, 2023 until 2026. On September 23, 2023, he debuted with the senior Köln team as a late substitute in a 2–1 Bundesliga loss to Werder Bremen.

Downs scored his first career Bundesliga goal on March 9, 2024 against Borussia Mönchengladbach. On May 11, 2024, he scored the match-winner in stoppage time against Union Berlin. Downs finished the season with two Bundesliga goals in just 173 minutes played, receiving limited opportunities in his club's relegation.

In the 2024–25 1. FC Köln season in the 2. Bundesliga, Downs helped Köln to the league title and automatic promotion to the Bundesliga. He had 11 goals and six assists in just 1,964 minutes played across all competitions, including a goal and assist against Bayer Leverkusen in the 2024–25 DFB-Pokal quarterfinals. Downs finished the season tied for the lead in goalscoring for his club.

=== Southampton ===
On July 9, 2025, Downs joined Southampton on a four-year contract. He made his debut on August 9, in a 2–1 victory against Wrexham. On January 7, 2026, Downs joined Hamburger SV on loan for the remainder of the 2025–26 season.

On September 2, 2026, Downs joined St. Louis City SC on loan until the end of the 2027 MLS season.

== International career ==
Downs holds dual citizenship, having been born in Germany to an American father and German mother, and having been raised in both countries. In April 2022, he was called up to a training camp for the United States U20s in Carson, California. In May 2022, he was named to the United States U20 provisional roster for the 2022 CONCACAF U-20 Championship but did not make the final squad. In September 2022, he was put on standby for the Germany U19s for 2023 UEFA European Under-19 Championship qualification but did not make the final squad.

Downs was called up to a training camp in June 2024 for the United States U23s in Kansas City, Kansas ahead of the 2024 Summer Olympics but was not named to the final Olympics squad. He was called up to the Germany U20s for sets of friendlies in each of September, October, and November 2024.

On May 22, 2025, Downs was called up by United States national team coach Mauricio Pochettino for training camp in Chicago ahead of matches against Turkey and Switzerland. On June 5, 2025, Downs was named to the USMNT final roster for the 2025 CONCACAF Gold Cup.

In the 2025 CONCACAF Gold Cup quarterfinal match against Costa Rica, Downs scored the winning penalty in the shootout to send the United States to the semi-finals.

== Career statistics ==
=== Club ===
As of match played November 8, 2026

Appearances and goals by club, season and competition
Club	Season	League			National cup (Note: Includes DFB-Pokal, FA Cup, U.S. Open Cup)		League cup (Note: Includes EFL Cup)		Other		Total	
Club	Season	Division	Apps	Goals	Apps	Goals	Apps	Goals	Apps	Goals	Apps	Goals
1. FC Köln II	2022–23	Regionalliga West	3	0	—		—		—		3	0
1. FC Köln II	2023–24	Regionalliga West	19	7	—		—		—		19	7
1. FC Köln II	Total		22	7	—		—		—		22	7
1. FC Köln	2023–24	Bundesliga	10	2	—		—		—		10	2
1. FC Köln	2024–25	2. Bundesliga	29	10	3	1	—		—		32	11
1. FC Köln	Total		39	12	3	1	—		—		42	13
Southampton	2025–26	Championship	11	0	0	0	3	0	—		14	0
Southampton	2026–27	Championship	0	0	0	0	0	0	—		0	0
Southampton	Total		11	0	0	0	3	0	—		14	0
Hamburger SV (loan)	2025–26	Bundesliga	12	0	0	0	—		—		12	0
St. Louis City SC (loan)	2026	Major League Soccer	10	0	2	0	—		0	0	12	0
Career total			94	19	5	1	3	0	0	0	102	20

=== International ===
As of match played September 29, 2026

Appearances and goals by national team and year
National team	Year	Apps	Goals
United States	2025	6	0
United States	2026	1	0
Total		7	0

== Honors ==
1. FC Koln

- 2. Bundesliga: 2024–25

St. Louis City SC

- U.S. Open Cup: 2026
