= Max Finkgräfe =

German footballer (born 2004)

Personal information
- Date of birth: 27 March 2004 (age 22)
- Place of birth: Mönchengladbach, Germany
- Height: 1.83 m (6 ft 0 in)
- Position: Left-back

Team information
- Current team: RB Leipzig
- Number: 35

Youth career
- 2015–2016: Fortuna Düsseldorf
- 2016–2018: Borussia Dortmund
- 2018–2020: Borussia Mönchengladbach
- 2020–2021: SG Unterrath
- 2021–2023: 1. FC Köln

Senior career*
Years	Team	Apps	(Gls)
2023	1. FC Köln II	8	(2)
2023–2025	1. FC Köln	38	(1)
2025–	RB Leipzig	16	(1)

International career^{‡}
2024	Germany U20	2	(0)
- * Club domestic league appearances and goals as of 24 October 2026 ‡ National team caps and goals as of 19 November 2024

Max Finkgräfe (German pronunciation: [maks ˈfɪŋkɡʁɛːfə]; born 27 March 2004) is a German professional footballer who plays as a left-back for Bundesliga club RB Leipzig.

== Club career ==
Finkgräfe is a product of the youth academies of Fortuna Düsseldorf, Borussia Dortmund, Borussia Mönchengladbach, and SG Unterrath before joining 1. FC Köln's youth side in 2021. On 23 April 2023, he signed a professional contract with 1. FC Köln until 2025. He helped the 1. FC Köln U19s win the DFB-Pokal Junioren for the 2022–23 season. He made his senior and professional debut with the club as a substitute in a 1–0 loss Bundesliga match against Borussia Dortmund on 19 August 2023.

On 3 July 2025, Finkgräfe signed a five-year contract with RB Leipzig. On 24 April 2026, he scored his first goal during a 3–1 win over Union Berlin in the league.

== Career statistics ==
As of match played 24 October 2026

Appearances and goals by club, season and competition
Club	Season	League			DFB-Pokal		Europe		Other		Total	
Club	Season	Division	Apps	Goals	Apps	Goals	Apps	Goals	Apps	Goals	Apps	Goals
1. FC Köln II	2023–24	Regionalliga West	8	2	—		—		—		8	2
1. FC Köln	2023–24	Bundesliga	24	1	0	0	—		—		24	1
1. FC Köln	2024–25	2. Bundesliga	14	0	2	0	—		—		16	0
1. FC Köln	Total		38	1	2	0	—		—		40	1
RB Leipzig	2025–26	Bundesliga	13	1	1	0	—		—		14	1
RB Leipzig	2026–27	Bundesliga	3	0	1	0	1 (Note: Appearances in UEFA Champions League)	0	—		5	0
RB Leipzig	Total		16	1	2	0	1	0	—		19	1
Career total			62	4	4	0	1	0	0	0	67	4

== Honours ==
1.FC Koln

- 2.Bundesliga: 2024–25
