= Rijad Smajić =

Bosnian footballer

Personal information
- Date of birth: 2 May 2004 (age 22)
- Place of birth: Cologne, Germany
- Height: 1.90 m (6 ft 3 in)
- Position: Centre-back

Team information
- Current team: FC St. Pauli II (on loan from FC Köln)
- Number: 22

Youth career
- 2017–2019: Fortuna Köln
- 2019–2022: 1. FC Köln

Senior career*
Years	Team	Apps	(Gls)
2021–	1. FC Köln II	56	(4)
2025–	→ FC St. Pauli II (loan)	25	(0)

International career
2022	Bosnia and Herzegovina U19	5	(0)
2024	Bosnia and Herzegovina U21	3	(0)
- * Club domestic league appearances and goals as of 20 June 2026

Rijad Smajić (born 2 May 2004) is a Bosnian professional footballer who plays as a centre-back for Regionalliga Nord club FC St. Pauli II, on loan from 1. FC Köln II.

== Club career ==
Smajić, who joined 1. FC Köln from Fortuna Köln in 2019 as a youth player, secured a three-year contract with the team in October 2022. He has been named on the bench multiple times for the first-team in the Bundesliga and the Conference League.

== International career ==
Smajić was born in Cologne to parents of Bosnian descent, making him eligible to play for both Germany and Bosnia and Herzegovina at the international level. He has represented the Bosnia and Herzegovina U19 team.

== Career statistics ==
As of match played 29 June 2026

Appearances and goals by club, season and competition
Club	Season	League			National cup		Continental		Total	
Club	Season	Division	Apps	Goals	Apps	Goals	Apps	Goals	Apps	Goals
1. FC Köln II	2021–22	Regionalliga West	3	0	—		—		3	0
1. FC Köln II	2022–23	Regionalliga West	12	1	—		—		12	1
1. FC Köln II	2023–24	Regionalliga West	23	1	—		—		23	1
1. FC Köln II	2024–25	Regionalliga West	18	2	—		—		18	2
1. FC Köln II	Total		56	4	—		—		56	4
FC St. Pauli II (loan)	2025–26	Regionalliga Nord	25	0	—		—		25	0
Career total			81	4	—		—		81	4
