= Florian Engelhardt =

German professional footballer (born 2003)

Personal information
- Date of birth: 16 June 2003 (age 23)
- Place of birth: Germany
- Height: 1.75 m (5 ft 9 in)
- Position: Midfielder

Youth career
- –2018: Fortuna Köln
- 2018–2020: 1. FC Köln
- 2020–2021: Fortuna Köln
- 2021–2022: Viktoria Köln

Senior career*
Years	Team	Apps	(Gls)
2022–2026	Viktoria Köln	79	(1)
2023	→ Rot-Weiß Koblenz (loan)	6	(0)
- * Club domestic league appearances and goals as of 29 May 2026

Florian Engelhardt (born 16 June 2003) is a German professional footballer who plays as a midfielder.

== Early life ==
Florian Engelhardt was born in Germany on 16 June 2003.

== Career ==
Engelhardt would play in Fortuna Köln's youth squad, before moving to 1. FC Köln. He later switched back to Fortuna Köln at the start of the 2020–21 season, before switching yet again, this time to Viktoria Koln. In the 2022–23 season, while playing for Viktoria Köln, Florian was on the bench sometimes, but he'd never make an appearance. He was later loaned out to Rot-Weiß Koblenz on 16 January 2023. Eventually, his loan at Koblenz ended on 30 June 2023, and he has been playing for Viktoria Köln ever since. In a press release, Engelhardt was quoted as saying, "I'm very proud to be able to remain a part of Viktoria Köln, I took my first steps as a professional here, making my debut last year." "I certainly didn't have the easiest path, but I always believed in it."
