= Elias Bakatukanda =

German footballer (born 2004)

Personal information
- Full name: Elias-Geoffrey Bakatukanda
- Date of birth: 13 April 2004 (age 22)
- Place of birth: Cologne, Germany
- Height: 1.93 m (6 ft 4 in)
- Position: Centre-back

Team information
- Current team: VfL Osnabrück (on loan from 1. FC Köln)
- Number: 38

Youth career
- 2010–2011: SC Weiler-Volkhoven
- 2011–2023: 1. FC Köln

Senior career*
Years	Team	Apps	(Gls)
2023–2024	1. FC Köln II	35	(2)
2024–	1. FC Köln	3	(0)
2025–2026	→ Blau-Weiß Linz (loan)	27	(1)
2026–	→ VfL Osnabrück (loan)	0	(0)

International career^{‡}
2026–	DR Congo U23	1	(0)
- * Club domestic league appearances and goals as of 29 August 2026 ‡ National team caps and goals as of 18:24, 27 March 2026 (UTC)

Elias-Geoffrey Bakatukanda (born 13 April 2004) is a professional footballer who plays as a centre-back for 2. Bundesliga club VfL Osnabrück, on loan from 1. FC Köln. Born in Germany, he represents Democratic Republic of the Congo internationally.

== Club career ==
Bakatukanda joined the youth academy of 1. FC Köln from SC Weiler-Volkhoven in 2011, and worked his way up their youth levels. On 13 April 2023, he signed his first professional contract with Köln until 2026. He made his senior and professional debut with Köln in a 3–1 win 2. Bundesliga match over Schalke 04 on 1 September 2024. On 8 January 2025, he extended his contract with Köln until the summer of 2028 and joined Blau-Weiß Linz for the second half of the 2024–25 season in the Austrian Football Bundesliga. On 18 June 2025, Bakatukanda extended his loan with Blau-Weiß Linz for the following season 2025–26.

On 2 September 2026, Bakatukanda moved on a new loan to VfL Osnabrück in the 2. Bundesliga.

== International career ==
Born in Germany, Bakatukanda is of DR Congolese descent. In August 2023, he was called up to the Germany U20s for a set of friendlies.

== Career statistics ==
As of match played 16 May 2026

Appearances and goals by club, season and competition
Club	Season	League			National Cup (Note: Includes Austrian Cup, DFB-Pokal)		Europe		Other		Total	
Club	Season	Division	Apps	Goals	Apps	Goals	Apps	Goals	Apps	Goals	Apps	Goals
1. FC Köln II	2023–24	Regionalliga West	24	2	—		—		—		24	2
1. FC Köln II	2024–25	Regionalliga West	11	0	—		—		—		11	0
1. FC Köln II	Total		35	2	—		—		—		35	2
1. FC Köln	2024–25	2. Bundesliga	3	0	0	0	—		—		3	0
1. FC Köln	2026–27	Bundesliga	0	0	0	0	—		—		0	0
1. FC Köln	Total		3	0	0	0	—		—		3	0
Blau-Weiß Linz (loan)	2024–25	Austrian Bundesliga	12	1	—		—		—		12	1
Blau-Weiß Linz (loan)	2025–26	Austrian Bundesliga	15	0	2	0	—		—		17	0
Blau-Weiß Linz (loan)	Total		27	1	2	0	—		—		29	1
Career total			65	3	2	0	0	0	0	0	67	3

== Honours ==
1.FC Köln

- 2. Bundesliga: 2024–25
