= Sargis Adamyan =

Armenian footballer (born 1993)

Personal information
- Date of birth: 23 May 1993 (age 33)
- Place of birth: Yerevan, Armenia
- Height: 1.84 m (6 ft 0 in)
- Position: Forward

Youth career
- 2005–2009: Neubrandenburg 04
- 2009–2012: Hansa Rostock

Senior career*
Years	Team	Apps	(Gls)
2012–2014	Hansa Rostock II	21	(4)
2013	Hansa Rostock	8	(0)
2014–2016	TSG Neustrelitz	52	(13)
2016–2017	TSV Steinbach	47	(15)
2017–2019	Jahn Regensburg	66	(20)
2019	TSG Hoffenheim II	5	(1)
2019–2022	TSG Hoffenheim	46	(8)
2022	→ Club Brugge (loan)	15	(6)
2022–2025	1. FC Köln	50	(2)
2025	→ Jahn Regensburg (loan)	16	(2)
2025–2026	1. FC Köln II	21	(7)

International career^{‡}
2013	Armenia U21	5	(0)
2013–2023	Armenia	36	(2)
- * Club domestic league appearances and goals as of 18:51, 4 June 2026 (UTC) ‡ National team caps and goals as of 8 September 2023

Sargis Adamyan (Armenian: Սարգիս Ադամյան; born 23 May 1993) is an Armenian professional footballer who plays as a forward.

== Early life ==
Born in Yerevan, Armenia, Adamyan moved to Germany at age five. He spent some of his youth years at Hansa Rostock.

== Career ==
In the 2016–17 season, Adamyan scored 16 goals and made 5 assists in 33 Regionalliga Südwest matches for TSV Steinbach.

On 5 June 2017, he signed a two-year contract with 2. Bundesliga side SSV Jahn Regensburg.

Adamyan signed a three-year contract with Bundesliga club TSG Hoffenheim on 14 May 2019.

In January 2022 he was loaned to Belgian side Club Brugge to the end of the 2021–22 season, with an option to buy.

After the end of his loan at Brugge, Adamyan transferred to 1. FC Köln, where he signed a contract until 2026.

To gain more match time, he joined Jahn Regensburg in January 2025 on a half -season long loan.

== Personal life ==
In August 2021, Adamyan married German model Anna Wilken, who is known from Germany's Next Topmodel. In 2023, they welcomed a son.

== Career statistics ==
=== Club ===
As of match played 2 May 2026

Appearances and goals by club, season and competition
Club	Season	League			National cup (Note: Includes DFB-Pokal, Belgian Cup)		Europe		Other		Total	
Club	Season	Division	Apps	Goals	Apps	Goals	Apps	Goals	Apps	Goals	Apps	Goals
Hansa Rostock	2012–13	3. Liga	8	0	0	0	—		—		8	0
TSG Neustrelitz	2013–14	Regionalliga Nordost	9	1	0	0	—		2 (Note: Appearances in Regionalliga promotion play-offs)	0	11	1
TSG Neustrelitz	2014–15	Regionalliga Nordost	25	5	—		—		—		25	5
TSG Neustrelitz	2015–16	Regionalliga Nordost	19	7	—		—		—		19	7
TSG Neustrelitz	Total		53	13	0	0	—		2	0	55	13
TSV Steinbach	2015–16	Regionalliga Südwest	14	2	—		—		—		14	2
TSV Steinbach	2016–17	Regionalliga Südwest	33	16	—		—		—		33	16
TSV Steinbach	Total		47	18	—		—		—		47	18
Jahn Regensburg	2017–18	2. Bundesliga	33	5	2	0	—		—		35	5
Jahn Regensburg	2018–19	2. Bundesliga	33	15	1	0	—		—		34	15
Jahn Regensburg	Total		66	20	3	0	—		—		69	20
TSG Hoffenheim	2019–20	Bundesliga	15	5	1	1	—		—		16	6
TSG Hoffenheim	2020–21	Bundesliga	18	2	1	0	4 (Note: Appearances in UEFA Europa League)	2	—		23	4
TSG Hoffenheim	2021–22	Bundesliga	13	1	1	0	—		—		14	1
TSG Hoffenheim	Total		46	8	3	1	4	2	—		53	11
Club Brugge (loan)	2022–23	Belgian Pro League	15	6	1	0	—		—		16	6
1. FC Köln	2022–23	Bundesliga	24	1	1	0	7 (Note: Appearances in UEFA Europa Conference League)	1	—		32	2
1. FC Köln	2023–24	Bundesliga	20	1	1	1	—		—		21	2
1. FC Köln	2024–25	2. Bundesliga	6	0	1	0	—		—		7	0
1. FC Köln	Total		50	2	3	1	7	1	—		60	4
Jahn Regensburg (loan)	2024–25	2. Bundesliga	16	2	0	0	—		—		16	2
1. FC Köln II	2025–26	Regionalliga West	21	7	—		—		—		21	7
Career total			322	76	10	2	11	3	2	0	345	81

=== International ===
As of match played 8 September 2023

Appearances and goals by national team and year
National team	Year	Apps	Goals
Armenia	2013	1	0
Armenia	2014	1	0
Armenia	2015	0	0
Armenia	2016	0	0
Armenia	2017	4	0
Armenia	2018	7	1
Armenia	2019	5	0
Armenia	2020	1	1
Armenia	2021	11	0
Armenia	2022	3	0
Armenia	2023	3	0
Total		36	2

Scores and results list Armenia's goal tally first, score column indicates score after each Adamyan goal.

List of international goals scored by Sargis Adamyan
No.	Date	Venue	Opponent	Score	Result	Competition
1	19 November 2018	Rheinpark Stadion, Vaduz, Liechtenstein	Liechtenstein	1–0	2–2	2018–19 UEFA Nations League D
2	15 November 2020	Boris Paichadze Dinamo Arena, Tbilisi, Georgia	Georgia	2–1	2–1	2020–21 UEFA Nations League C
