= Faride Alidou =

German footballer (born 2001)

Personal information
- Date of birth: 18 July 2001 (age 25)
- Place of birth: Hamburg, Germany
- Height: 1.86 m (6 ft 1 in)
- Position: Winger

Team information
- Current team: Holstein Kiel
- Number: 17

Youth career
- –2012: Einigkeit Wilhelmsburg
- 2012–2019: Hamburger SV

Senior career*
Years	Team	Apps	(Gls)
2019–2021	Hamburger SV II	25	(3)
2021–2022	Hamburger SV	23	(2)
2022–2025	Eintracht Frankfurt	15	(0)
2023–2024	→ 1. FC Köln (loan)	26	(4)
2024–2025	→ Hellas Verona (loan)	3	(0)
2025–2026	1. FC Kaiserslautern	23	(1)
2026	→ Eintracht Braunschweig (loan)	9	(2)
2026–	Holstein Kiel	0	(0)

International career^{‡}
2021	Germany U20	2	(1)
2022–2023	Germany U21	10	(0)
- * Club domestic league appearances and goals as of 18 May 2026 ‡ National team caps and goals as of 28 June 2023

Faride Alidou (born 18 July 2001) is a German professional footballer who plays as a winger for 2. Bundesliga club Holstein Kiel. He has represented Germany at youth level.

== Club career ==
=== Hamburger SV ===
Born in Hamburg, Alidou played youth football for Einigkeit Wilhelmsburg before joining Hamburger SV's academy in 2012. Having played for Hamburger SV II since 2019, he made his debut for the club's first team on 16 October 2021 in a 1–1 draw with Fortuna Düsseldorf. He scored his first goal in a 4–1 win over Jahn Regensburg on 20 November 2021.

=== Eintracht Frankfurt ===
On 23 March 2022, Alidou signed a pre-contract agreement with Bundesliga club Eintracht Frankfurt. He committed to a four-year contract at the club.

==== Loan to 1. FC Köln ====
On 21 August 2023, Alidou joined 1. FC Köln on loan.

==== Loan to Hellas Verona ====
On 25 August 2024, Alidou moved on loan to Hellas Verona in Italy, with an option to buy.

=== Kaiserslautern ===
On 23 January 2025, Alidou's loan to Verona was terminated and he signed with 2. Bundesliga club 1. FC Kaiserslautern.

On 12 January 2026, Alidou moved to Eintracht Braunschweig on loan with an option to buy.

=== Holstein Kiel ===
On 6 July 2026, Alidou joined Holstein Kiel in 2. Bundesliga for one season.

== International career ==
Born in Germany, Alidou is of Togolese descent. He was called up to the Germany national under-20 team for the first time for fixtures against France and Portugal in November 2021. He appeared in both fixtures, scoring in the 3–2 win over France. He was called up to the Germany national under-21 team in March 2022 after multiple players withdrew due to injury.

== Style of play ==
Alidou is right-footed, and played as a left winger in a front three at HSV. Hamburg's sporting director Michael Mutzel stated that Alidou "impresses through the freedom he plays with — he's also a strong dribbler and has good pace."

== Career statistics ==
As of match played 16 September 2024

Appearances and goals by club, season and competition
Club	Season	League			Cup		Europe		Other		Total	
Club	Season	Division	Apps	Goals	Apps	Goals	Apps	Goals	Apps	Goals	Apps	Goals
Hamburger SV II	2019–20	Regionalliga Nord	7	1	—		—		—		7	1
Hamburger SV II	2020–21	Regionalliga Nord	10	1	—		—		—		10	1
Hamburger SV II	2021–22	Regionalliga Nord	8	1	—		—		—		8	1
Hamburger SV II	Total		25	3	—		—		—		25	3
Hamburger SV	2021–22	2. Bundesliga	23	2	4	0	—		0	0	27	2
Eintracht Frankfurt	2022–23	Bundesliga	15	0	1	0	5 (Note: Appearances in UEFA Champions League)	1	0	0	21	1
1. FC Köln (loan)	2023–24	Bundesliga	26	4	0	0	—		—		26	4
Hellas Verona (loan)	2024–25	Serie A	2	0	—		—		—		26	4
Career total			91	9	5	0	5	1	0	0	101	10
