= 2026–27 1. FC Köln season =

German association football club season

1. FC Köln
2026–27 season
- President: Jörn Stobbe
- Head coach: René Wagner
- Stadium: RheinEnergieStadion
- Bundesliga: TBD
- DFB-Pokal: TBD
Home colours	Away colours	Third colours
- All statistics correct as of 15 August 2026.

The 2026–27 season is the 79th season in the history of 1. FC Köln, and the club's second consecutive campaign in the top flight of German football, the Bundesliga. In addition to the domestic league, the club is participating in the DFB-Pokal.

== Players ==
=== First-team squad ===
As of 31 August 2026

Note: Flags indicate national team as defined under FIFA eligibility rules. Players may hold more than one non-FIFA nationality.

Note: Flags indicate national team as defined under FIFA eligibility rules; some limited exceptions apply. Players may hold more than one non-FIFA nationality.

No.	Pos.	Nation	Player
1	GK	GER	Marvin Schwäbe
2	DF	SUI	Joël Schmied
3	DF	GER	Julian Pauli
4	DF	GER	Timo Hübers
5	MF	GER	Tom Krauß
6	MF	TUN	Ellyes Skhiri
7	FW	GER	Luca Waldschmidt
9	FW	GER	Ragnar Ache
10	FW	GER	Saïd El Mala
11	FW	ENG	Reigan Heskey
14	DF	GHA	Gideon Mensah
17	DF	BEL	Alessio Castro-Montes
18	MF	ISL	Ísak Bergmann Jóhannesson
19	FW	GER	Malek El Mala
20	GK	GER	Ron-Robert Zieler

No.	Pos.	Nation	Player
21	GK	FRA	Martin James
22	DF	ENG	Jahmai Simpson-Pusey
23	MF	AUS	Paul Okon-Engstler
24	DF	GEO	Luka Lochoshvili
27	FW	NED	Thijs Dallinga (on loan from Bologna)
28	DF	NOR	Sebastian Sebulonsen
29	FW	GER	Jan Thielmann
30	FW	GER	Marius Bülter
31	MF	POR	Gil Neves
33	DF	NED	Rav van den Berg
37	MF	GER	Linton Maina
44	GK	GER	Matthias Köbbing
—	MF	ENG	Mikey Moore
—	DF	GER	Elias Bakatukanda
—	FW	BIH	Imad Rondić

=== Out on loan ===
Note: Flags indicate national team as defined under FIFA eligibility rules; some limited exceptions apply. Players may hold more than one non-FIFA nationality.

No.	Pos.	Nation	Player
—	DF	BIH	Jusuf Gazibegović (at Widzew Łódź (loan until 30 June 2027))
—	FW	GER	Fynn Schenten (at Roda JC Kerkrade (loan until 30 June 2027))
—	FW	GER	Youssoupha Niang (at FC St. Pauli (loan until 30 June 2027))

== Transfers ==
=== In ===
Date	Pos.	Player	From	Type	Fee	Ref.
28 May 2026	MF	(Germany) Tom Krauß	(Germany) Mainz 05	Transfer	€3,500,000	
3 June 2026	MF	(Poland) Jakub Kamiński	(Germany) VfL Wolfsburg	Transfer	€5,500,000	
12 June 2026	DF	(England) Jahmai Simpson-Pusey	(England) Manchester City	Transfer	€5,000,000	
2 July 2026	DF	(Georgia (country)) Luka Lochoshvili	(Germany) 1. FC Nürnberg	Transfer	€4,500,000	
11 July 2026	DF	(Ghana) Gideon Mensah	(France) AJ Auxerre	Transfer	Free	
18 July 2026	FW	(England) Reigan Heskey	(England) Manchester City	Transfer	€2,000,000	
24 July 2026	GK	(France) Martin James	(France) Paris Saint-Germain	Transfer	Free	
24 July 2026	MF	(Australia) Paul Okon-Engstler	(Australia) Sydney FC	Transfer	€1,000,000	

=== Out ===
Date	Pos.	Player	To	Type	Fee	Ref.
19 May 2026	MF	(Germany) Eric Martel	(Germany) Mainz 05	Transfer	Free	
12 June 2026	MF	(Bosnia and Herzegovina) Denis Huseinbašić	(Portugal) Braga	Transfer	Free	
19 June 2026	DF	(Germany) Dominique Heintz	(Germany) Fortuna Düsseldorf	Transfer	Free	
8 July 2026	MF	(Poland) Jakub Kamiński	(Portugal) Benfica	Transfer	€17,000,000	
11 August 2026	FW	(Togo) Mansour Ouro-Tagba	(Germany) VfL Bochum	Transfer	Undisclosed	

=== Loans in ===
Date	Pos.	Player	Loaned from	Type	Fee	Ref.
17 August 2026	CF	(Netherlands) Thijs Dallinga	(Italy) Bologna	Option to buy	€1,000,000	

=== Loans out ===
Date	Pos.	Player	Loaned to	Type	Fee	Ref.
26 July 2026	DF	(Bosnia and Herzegovina) Jusuf Gazibegović	(Poland) Widzew Łódź	Straight loan	—	
28 July 2026	FW	(Germany) Fynn Schenten	(Netherlands) Roda JC Kerkrade	Straight loan	—	
28 August 2026	FW	(Germany) Youssoupha Niang	(Germany) FC St. Pauli	Straight loan	—	

== Competitions ==
=== Overall record ===
Competition	First match	Last match	Starting round	Final position	Record							
Competition	First match	Last match	Starting round	Final position	Pld	W	D	L	GF	GA	GD	Win %
Bundesliga	August 2026	May 2027	Matchday 1		0	0	0	0	0	0	+0	—
DFB-Pokal	August 2026		First round		0	0	0	0	0	0	+0	—
Total					0	0	0	0	0	0	+0	—

Last updated: 15 August 2026

=== Bundesliga ===
==== League table ====
Pos	Team	Pld	W	D	L	GF	GA	GD	Pts	Qualification or relegation
13	SC Paderborn	9	2	4	3	8	11	−3	10	
14	FC Augsburg	9	2	3	4	20	20	0	9	
15	1. FC Köln	9	2	3	4	10	14	−4	9	
16	Union Berlin	9	1	4	4	7	21	−14	7	Qualification for the relegation play-offs
17	Schalke 04	9	1	3	5	5	11	−6	6	Relegation to 2. Bundesliga

Updated to match(es) played on 8 November 2026. Source: Bundesliga
Rules for classification: 1) Points; 2) Goal difference; 3) Goals scored; 4) Head-to-head aggregate results; 5) Head-to-head away goals scored; 6) Away goals scored; 7) Play-off at neutral site.
(Rules 4–6 only apply after all home-and-away matches have been played between the tied teams. Rule 7 only applies after the completion of the season.)

==== Results summary ====
Overall								Home						Away					
Pld	W	D	L	GF	GA	GD	Pts	W	D	L	GF	GA	GD	W	D	L	GF	GA	GD
8	2	3	3	10	12	−2	9	2	2	0	6	4	+2	0	1	3	4	8	−4

Last updated: 1 November 2026.
Source: Bundesliga

==== Results by round ====
Round	1	2	3	4	5	6	7	8	9	10	11	12	13	14	15	16	17	18	19	20	21	22	23	24	25	26	27	28	29	30	31	32	33	34
Ground	H	A	H	A	H	A	H	A																										
Result	W	L	D	L	W	L	D	D																										
Position																																		
Points	3	3	4	4	7	7	8	9																										

Updated to match(es) played on 1 November 2026. Source: 1. FC Köln fixtures & results - Bundesliga.com
A = Away; H = Home; W = Win; D = Draw; L = Loss

==== Matches ====
29 August 2026 1	1. FC Köln	3–2	TSG Hoffenheim	Cologne
15:30 CEST (UTC+2)	El Mala 51'; Dallinga 72', 82'		Daghim 27'; Moerstedt (penalty missed) 57', (yellow card) 90+4'; Kabak 67', (yellow card) 83'	Stadium: RheinEnergieStadion; Referee: Florian Badstübner

4 September 2026 2	VfB Stuttgart	4–1	1. FC Köln	Stuttgart
20:30 CEST (UTC+2)	El Khannouss 39'; Mittelstädt (yellow card) 51'; Prömel 60'; Demirović 75'; Vagnoman 90'	Report	Simpson-Pusey (yellow card) 41'; Hendriks 81' (o.g.); Krauß (yellow card) 85'; Castro-Montes (yellow card) 86'	Stadium: MHPArena; Referee: Christian Dingert

12 September 2026 3	1. FC Köln	1–1	Werder Bremen	Cologne
18:30 CEST (UTC+2)	Dallinga (penalty missed) 8'; Maina 11'; Mensah (yellow card) 86'; Okon-Engstler (yellow card) 90+2'		Füllkrug 69'; Deman (yellow card) 72'	Stadium: RheinEnergieStadion; Referee: Florian Exner

19 September 2026 4	Hamburger SV	2–1	1. FC Köln	Hamburg
15:30 CEST (UTC+2)	Grønbæk (yellow card) 10'; Capaldo 44'; Poulsen 49'		Mensah (yellow card) 54'; Jóhannesson (yellow card) 77'; Skhiri (yellow card) 84'; Ache 90'	Stadium: Volksparkstadion; Referee: Matthias Jöllenbeck

10 October 2026 5	1. FC Köln	2–1	Borussia Mönchengladbach	Cologne
15:30 CEST (UTC+2)	Bülter (yellow card) 13'; Jóhannesson 26'; El Mala 67'		Leszczyński (yellow card) 24'; Scally 39'; Uno (yellow card) 81'; Machino (yellow card) 90+6'	Stadium: RheinEnergieStadion; Referee: Florian Badstübner

17 October 2026 6	Eintracht Frankfurt	1–0	1. FC Köln	Frankfurt
20:30 CEST (UTC+2)	Götze (yellow card) 24'; Brassier (yellow card) 39'; Ebnoutalib 77'		Jóhannesson (yellow card) 45'; Sosa (yellow card) 90+4'	Stadium: Deutsche Bank Park; Referee: Benjamin Brand

24 October 2026 7	1. FC Köln	0–0	Schalke 04	Cologne
15:30 CEST (UTC+2)	Krauß (yellow card) 45+2'; Lochoshvili (yellow card) 81'	Report	Ebimbe (yellow card) 71'; Becker (yellow card) 83'; Kuruçay (yellow card) 89'	Stadium: RheinEnergieStadion; Attendance: 50,000; Referee: Harm Osmers

31 October 2026 8	Union Berlin	1–1	1. FC Köln	Berlin
14:30 CET	Haberer 10'; Van Den Bosch (yellow card) 37'; Imeri (yellow card) 54'; Kemlein (yellow card) 76'; Köhn (yellow card) 77'	Report	Simpson-Pusey (yellow card) 45+1'; Okon-Engstler (yellow card) 53'; Maina (yellow card) 69'; El Mala 79'	Stadium: Stadion An der Alten Försterei; Attendance: 22,012; Referee: Richard Hempel

8 November 2026 9	1. FC Köln	1–2	Bayer Leverkusen	Cologne
15:30 CET (UTC+1)	Krauß (yellow card) 40'; Moore (yellow card) 46'; Maina (yellow card) 52'; Schmied (yellow card) 57'; Sosa (yellow card) 70'; El Mala 90+2'; Simpson-Pusey (yellow card) 90+5'		García 7', (yellow card) 90+5'; Medina (yellow card) 34'; Moreira (yellow card) 52'; Tapsoba (yellow card) 53'; Schick 85'; Hofmann (yellow card) 90+6'	Stadium: RheinEnergieStadion; Attendance: 50,000; Referee: Felix Zwayer

21 November 2026 10	Bayern Munich	v	1. FC Köln	Munich
				Stadium: Allianz Arena

28 November 2026 11	1. FC Köln	v	SV Elversberg	Cologne
				Stadium: RheinEnergieStadion

5 December 2026 12	FC Augsburg	v	1. FC Köln	Augsburg
				Stadium: WWK Arena

12 December 2026 13	1. FC Köln	v	RB Leipzig	Cologne
				Stadium: RheinEnergieStadion

19 December 2026 14	Mainz 05	v	1. FC Köln	Mainz
				Stadium: Mewa Arena

9 January 2027 15	1. FC Köln	v	SC Freiburg	Cologne
				Stadium: RheinEnergieStadion

13 January 2027 16	1. FC Köln	v	Borussia Dortmund	Cologne
				Stadium: RheinEnergieStadion

16 January 2027 17	SC Paderborn	v	1. FC Köln	Paderborn
				Stadium: Home Deluxe Arena

23 January 2027 18	TSG Hoffenheim	v	1. FC Köln	Sinsheim
				Stadium: PreZero Arena

30 January 2027 19	1. FC Köln	v	VfB Stuttgart	Cologne
				Stadium: RheinEnergieStadion

6 February 2027 20	Werder Bremen	v	1. FC Köln	Bremen
				Stadium: Weserstadion

13 February 2027 21	1. FC Köln	v	Hamburger SV	Cologne
				Stadium: RheinEnergieStadion

20 February 2027 22	Borussia Mönchengladbach	v	1. FC Köln	Mönchengladbach
				Stadium: Borussia-Park

27 February 2027 23	1. FC Köln	v	Eintracht Frankfurt	Cologne
				Stadium: RheinEnergieStadion

3 March 2027 24	Schalke 04	v	1. FC Köln	Gelsenkirchen
				Stadium: Arena AufSchalke

6 March 2027 25	1. FC Köln	v	Union Berlin	Cologne
				Stadium: RheinEnergieStadion

13 March 2027 26	Bayer Leverkusen	v	1. FC Köln	Leverkusen
				Stadium: BayArena

20 March 2027 27	1. FC Köln	v	Bayern Munich	Cologne
				Stadium: RheinEnergieStadion

3 April 2027 28	SV Elversberg	v	1. FC Köln	Spiesen-Elversberg
				Stadium: Waldstadion an der Kaiserlinde

10 April 2027 29	1. FC Köln	v	FC Augsburg	Cologne
				Stadium: RheinEnergieStadion

17 April 2027 30	RB Leipzig	v	1. FC Köln	Leipzig
				Stadium: Red Bull Arena

24 April 2027 31	1. FC Köln	v	Mainz 05	Cologne
				Stadium: RheinEnergieStadion

8 May 2027 32	SC Freiburg	v	1. FC Köln	Freiburg im Breisgau
				Stadium: Europa-Park Stadion

15 May 2027 33	Borussia Dortmund	v	1. FC Köln	Dortmund
				Stadium: Signal Iduna Park

22 May 2027 34	1. FC Köln	v	SC Paderborn	Cologne
15:30 CEST (UTC+2)				Stadium: RheinEnergieStadion

=== DFB-Pokal ===
24 August 2026 First round	Würzburger Kickers	1–2	1. FC Köln	Würzburg
18:00 CEST (UTC+2)	Abrangao 18'		Jóhannesson 62', 77'	Stadium: Flyeralarm Arena; Referee: Martin Petersen

27 October 2026 Second round	1. FC Köln	5–0	Union Berlin	Cologne
20:45 CET	El Mala 32', 60'; Maina 51'; Jóhannesson 78'; Sebulonsen (yellow card) 84', (goal) 88'	Report	Querfeld (yellow card) 48'; Ljubičić (yellow card) 77'; Burcu (yellow card) 90'	Stadium: RheinEnergieStadion; Attendance: 49,000; Referee: Sven Jablonski

== Statistics ==
=== Appearances and goals ===
As of 17 August 2026

No.	Pos	Nat	Player	Total		Bundesliga		DFB-Pokal	
No.	Pos	Nat	Player	Apps	Goals	Apps	Goals	Apps	Goals
Goalkeepers
1	GK	(Germany) GER	Marvin Schwäbe	0	0	0	0	0	0
20	GK	(Germany) GER	Ron-Robert Zieler	0	0	0	0	0	0
44	GK	(Germany) GER	Matthias Köbbing	0	0	0	0	0	0
—	GK	(France) FRA	Martin James	0	0	0	0	0	0
Defenders
2	DF	(Switzerland) SUI	Joël Schmied	0	0	0	0	0	0
4	DF	(Germany) GER	Timo Hübers	0	0	0	0	0	0
17	DF	(Belgium) BEL	Alessio Castro-Montes	0	0	0	0	0	0
28	DF	(Norway) NOR	Sebastian Sebulonsen	0	0	0	0	0	0
33	DF	(Netherlands) NED	Rav van den Berg	0	0	0	0	0	0
36	DF	(Germany) GER	Cenny Neumann	0	0	0	0	0	0
—	DF	(Germany) GER	Elias Bakatukanda	0	0	0	0	0	0
—	DF	(Georgia (country)) GEO	Luka Lochoshvili	0	0	0	0	0	0
—	DF	(Ghana) GHA	Gideon Mensah	0	0	0	0	0	0
—	DF	(England) ENG	Julian Pauli	0	0	0	0	0	0
—	DF	(England) ENG	Jahmai Simpson-Pusey	0	0	0	0	0	0
Midfielders
18	MF	(Iceland) ISL	Ísak Bergmann Jóhannesson	0	0	0	0	0	0
34	MF	(Germany) GER	Fayssal Harchaoui	0	0	0	0	0	0
37	MF	(Germany) GER	Linton Maina	0	0	0	0	0	0
—	MF	(Germany) GER	Tom Krauß	0	0	0	0	0	0
—	MF	(Bosnia and Herzegovina) BIH	Emin Kujović	0	0	0	0	0	0
—	MF	(Portugal) POR	Gil Neves	0	0	0	0	0	0
—	MF	(Australia) AUS	Paul Okon-Engstler	0	0	0	0	0	0
Forwards
7	FW	(Germany) GER	Luca Waldschmidt	0	0	0	0	0	0
9	FW	(Germany) GER	Ragnar Ache	0	0	0	0	0	0
13	FW	(Germany) GER	Saïd El Mala	0	0	0	0	0	0
19	FW	(Germany) GER	Malek El Mala	0	0	0	0	0	0
29	FW	(Germany) GER	Jan Thielmann	0	0	0	0	0	0
30	FW	(Germany) GER	Marius Bülter	0	0	0	0	0	0
38	FW	(Germany) GER	Youssoupha Niang	0	0	0	0	0	0
—	FW	(England) ENG	Reigan Heskey	0	0	0	0	0	0
—	FW	(Bosnia and Herzegovina) BIH	Imad Rondić	0	0	0	0	0	0
—	FW	(Netherlands) NED	Thijs Dallinga	0	0	0	0	0	0

Last updated: 17 August 2026
Source: Competitions

=== Goalscorers ===
Rank	Pos.	No.	Nat.	Player	Bundesliga	DFB-Pokal	Total
				0	0	0	
Own goals | 0					0	0	
Totals ! 0					0	0	
