= 2024–25 Professional U21 Development League =

Youth Football League in England

Premier League 2
- Season: 2024–25
- Champions: Manchester City U21s (4th title)
- Regular Season Champions: Manchester City U21s
- Matches: 275 (260 RS, 15 PO)
- Goals: 1,009 (3.67 per match) (946 RS, 63 PO)
- Best player: (England) Jahmai Simpson-Pusey Manchester City U21s
- Top goalscorer: (England) Divin Mubama Manchester City U21s (17 Goals) (11 RS, 6 PO)
- Biggest home win: Brighton & Hove Albion U21s 10–0 Crystal Palace U21s (5 October 2024)
- Biggest away win: Fulham U21s 0–6 Chelsea U21s (4 October 2024)
- Highest scoring: Brighton & Hove Albion U21s 10–0 Crystal Palace U21s (5 October 2024)
- Longest winning run: 10 matches Manchester City U21s (23 August 2024 – 13 January 2025)
- Longest unbeaten run: 11 matches Manchester City U21s (23 August 2024 – 17 January 2025)
- Longest winless run: 16 matches Aston Villa U21s (27 September 2024 – 18 April 2025)
- Longest losing run: 8 matches Stoke City U21s (23 August 2024 – 29 November 2024)
- Highest attendance: 6,384; Norwich City U21s 3–5 Manchester United U21s; September 28, 2024
- Lowest attendance: 50; 2 matches

The 2024–25 Premier League 2 was the 13th season of the Professional Development League system. It continued to use the same format as the 2023–24 season.

== Premier League 2 ==
=== Table ===
Pos	Team	Pld	W	D	L	GF	GA	GD	Pts	
1	Manchester City U21s (R, C)	20	15	2	3	61	23	+38	47	Qualification to the Elimination Playoffs and Premier League International Cup
2	Fulham U21s	20	14	3	3	49	30	+19	45	Qualification to the Elimination Playoffs and Premier League International Cup
3	Chelsea U21s	20	12	2	6	51	30	+21	38	Qualification to the Elimination Playoffs and Premier League International Cup
4	West Ham United U21s	20	12	2	6	30	24	+6	38	Qualification to the Elimination Playoffs and Premier League International Cup
5	Manchester United U21s	20	11	3	6	45	31	+14	36	Qualification to the Elimination Playoffs and Premier League International Cup
6	Crystal Palace U21s	20	10	5	5	44	35	+9	35	Qualification to the Elimination Playoffs and Premier League International Cup
7	Southampton U21s	20	10	4	6	38	31	+7	34	Qualification to the Elimination Playoffs and Premier League International Cup
8	Arsenal U21s	20	10	3	7	44	38	+6	33	Qualification to the Elimination Playoffs and Premier League International Cup
9	Newcastle United U21s	20	10	2	8	39	37	+2	32	Qualification to the Elimination Playoffs and Premier League International Cup
10	Leicester City U21s	20	9	4	7	39	30	+9	31	Qualification to the Elimination Playoffs and Premier League International Cup
11	Brighton & Hove Albion U21s	20	8	6	6	39	22	+17	30	Qualification to the Elimination Playoffs and Premier League International Cup
12	Everton U21s	20	8	5	7	41	43	−2	29	Qualification to the Elimination Playoffs and Premier League International Cup
13	Sunderland U21s	20	8	4	8	48	35	+13	28	Qualification to the Elimination Playoffs and Premier League International Cup
14	Wolverhampton Wanderers U21s	20	8	4	8	30	36	−6	28	Qualification to the Elimination Playoffs and Premier League International Cup
15	Nottingham Forest U21s	20	8	3	9	32	28	+4	27	Qualification to the Elimination Playoffs and Premier League International Cup
16	Liverpool U21s	20	7	6	7	29	31	−2	27	Qualification to the Elimination Playoffs and Premier League International Cup
17	Leeds United U21s	20	6	7	7	27	32	−5	25	
18	West Bromwich Albion U21s	20	7	4	9	33	42	−9	25	
19	Middlesbrough U21s	20	7	1	12	27	43	−16	22	
20	Reading U21s	20	6	3	11	26	45	−19	21	
21	Blackburn Rovers U21s	20	6	2	12	31	47	−16	20	
22	Tottenham Hotspur U21s	20	6	1	13	35	47	−12	19	
23	Derby County U21s	20	5	4	11	27	43	−16	19	
24	Norwich City U21s	20	5	3	12	29	49	−20	18	
25	Stoke City U21s	20	4	3	13	26	43	−17	15	
26	Aston Villa U21s	20	2	6	12	26	51	−25	12	

Source: Premier League 2 Table
(C) Champions; (R) Regular Season Champions

=== Results ===
Home \ Away	ARS	AVL	BLB	BHA	CHE	CRY	DER	EVE	FUL	LEE	LEI	LIV	MNC	MNU	MID	NEW	NOR	NFO	REA	SOU	STK	SUN	TOT	WBA	WHU	WOL
Arsenal U21s	—	4–1	—	1–1	—	—	2–2	—	—	—	—	0–3	—	4–2	2–1	4–1	—	2–0	—	—	—	1–2	2–5	—	—	—
Aston Villa U21s	—	—	2–1	—	—	—	3–1	1–2	3–3	—	—	2–2	—	—	—	2–3	0–3	—	1–3	—	—	2–2	—	—	—	0–4
Blackburn Rovers U21s	3–4	—	—	—	—	2–7	—	—	2–3	—	3–2	—	1–3	1–3	3–2	—	2–0	3–2	—	—	—	—	—	2–2	—	—
Brighton & Hove Albion U21s	—	1–1	—	—	—	10–0	2–1	—	1–3	—	1–1	2–1	—	0–1	—	—	—	—	—	—	—	—	5–1	—	0–2	1–1
Chelsea U21s	2–1	4–1	—	—	—	—	—	1–1	—	1–1	3–1	—	—	2–0	—	—	—	—	3–0	0–2	—	—	1–2	1–2	—	—
Crystal Palace U21s	2–2	3–0	—	—	2–4	—	—	—	0–1	—	—	3–3	—	—	—	—	2–2	2–1	1–1	—	—	—	5–1	—	—	0–1
Derby County U21s	—	—	0–0	—	2–6	—	—	—	—	1–2	—	—	2–3	—	—	1–0	—	—	—	0–0	—	—	2–1	4–1	0–1	4–1
Everton U21s	1–2	—	3–1	1–0	—	—	—	—	—	1–3	—	—	—	—	—	—	3–4	2–4	3–3	1–2	4–1	4–3	—	—	—	—
Fulham U21s	6–3	—	—	—	0–6	—	4–0	2–2	—	2–1	3–1	—	1–1	—	2–0	—	—	0–1	—	—	—	5–2	—	—	—	—
Leeds United U21s	—	1–1	2–4	1–1	—	1–1	—	—	—	—	—	—	—	2–2	0–2	1–3	2–1	—	—	—	—	—	—	2–1	1–2	—
Leicester City U21s	—	3–1	—	—	—	0–2	2–1	1–1	—	—	—	—	—	—	3–1	—	—	—	—	1–2	4–0	1–2	2–0	0–0	—	—
Liverpool U21s	—	—	—	—	0–3	—	3–1	0–2	—	1–1	1–2	—	3–1	—	0–1	—	—	—	—	—	—	—	—	0–5	1–1	4–1
Manchester City U21s	—	4–1	—	2–1	5–0	2–3	—	5–0	—	—	—	—	—	—	—	4–0	5–0	—	—	—	2–2	—	2–0	—	4–1	—
Manchester United U21s	—	2–1	—	—	—	—	—	—	0–1	—	—	0–1	1–3	—	—	—	—	3–3	—	5–1	4–1	—	2–0	5–1	1–0	—
Middlesbrough U21s	—	4–2	—	0–3	1–3	—	—	—	—	—	—	—	0–3	—	—	0–2	—	1–4	1–3	1–0	—	—	—	2–1	1–1	—
Newcastle United U21s	—	—	2–0	—	3–2	1–0	—	2–2	—	—	3–6	—	—	0–2	—	—	—	—	7–1	—	4–1	1–1	—	—	0–1	—
Norwich City U21s	0–3	—	—	1–1	1–3	—	—	—	—	—	1–5	—	—	3–5	1–3	—	—	0–3	—	—	0–3	0–3	—	6–1	—	—
Nottingham Forest U21s	—	—	—	0–1	2–4	—	1–1	—	—	0–1	2–0	—	2–3	—	—	2–3	—	—	—	0–2	1–0	—	—	—	—	2–0
Reading U21s	—	—	1–0	2–0	—	—	0–1	—	1–5	—	—	1–1	—	1–4	—	—	1–2	0–2	—	—	1–5	—	—	—	0–3	—
Southampton U21s	—	—	3–0	2–4	—	0–2	—	—	5–0	—	—	1–1	—	—	—	4–2	2–3	—	—	—	—	3–3	2–1	—	—	2–1
Stoke City U21s	0–1	1–1	—	—	—	1–2	5–3	—	0–1	1–1	—	0–1	—	—	1–3	—	—	—	—	0–3	—	—	—	—	—	4–1
Sunderland U21s	—	—	—	—	—	—	6–0	—	—	3–0	—	2–3	2–3	5–2	3–2	—	—	0–0	1–2	—	—	—	2–3	—	—	5–0
Tottenham Hotspur U21s	—	—	4–0	—	—	—	—	4–5	1–4	0–3	—	2–0	—	—	6–1	0–1	1–1	—	1–4	—	—	—	—	—	—	2–3
West Bromwich Albion U21s	4–3	—	—	0–4	—	0–2	—	0–1	—	—	—	—	0–5	—	—	3–1	—	—	3–1	1–1	5–0	2–1	—	—	—	—
West Ham United U21s	1–0	—	2–1	—	3–2	2–5	—	—	0–3	—	2–3	—	—	—	—	—	1–0	—	—	5–1	1–0	1–0	—	—	—	—
Wolverhampton Wanderers U21s	1–3	—	0–2	—	—	—	—	4–2	—	4–1	1–1	—	3–1	1–1	—	—	—	—	1–0	—	—	—	—	1–1	1–0	—

Source: Premier League 2 Results
Legend: Blue = home team win; Yellow = draw; Red = away team win.

=== Elimination Playoffs ===
Round of 16
1	Manchester City U21s	2
16	Liverpool U21s	1
8	Arsenal U21s	2
9	Newcastle United U21s	1
5	Manchester United U21s	4
12	Everton U21s	2
4	West Ham United U21s	3
13	Sunderland U21s	1
6	Crystal Palace U21s	3
11	Brighton & Hove Albion U21s	1
3	Chelsea U21s	4
14	Wolverhampton Wanderers U21s	0
7	Southampton U21s	5
10	Leicester City U21s	3
2	Fulham U21s	1
15	Nottingham Forest U21s	0

Quarter-finals
1	Manchester City U21s	3
8	Arsenal U21s	2
5	Manchester United U21s	4
4	West Ham United U21s	1
6	Crystal Palace U21s	6
3	Chelsea U21s	0
7	Southampton U21s	5
2	Fulham U21s	2

Semi-finals
1	Manchester City U21s	2
5	Manchester United U21s	0
6	Crystal Palace U21s	1
7	Southampton U21s	2

Final
1	Manchester City U21s	2
7	Southampton U21s	0

==== Round of 16 ====
25 April 2025
19:00 BST

Arsenal U21s	2–1	Newcastle United U21s
Butler-Oyedeji 25' (pen.); Edwards 90+3'	Report	Bailey 46'

Mangata Pay UK Stadium, Borehamwood
Attendance: 260
Referee: Harry Wager
25 April 2025
19:00 BST

Manchester City U21s	2–1 (a.e.t.)	Liverpool U21s
Mubama 19', 107'	Report	Pilling 68'

Joie Stadium, Manchester
Attendance: 541
Referee: Aaron Jackson
25 April 2025
19:00 BST

Manchester United U21s	4–2	Everton U21s
Wheatley 11', 51'; Fletcher 71'; Koné 84'	Report	Sherif 1', 33'

Leigh Sports Village, Leigh
Attendance: 250
Referee: Aaron Bannister
26 April 2025
12:00 BST

West Ham United U21s	3–1	Sunderland U21s
Ajala 1'; Orford 63'; Battrum 90'	Report	Bell 28'

Rush Green Stadium, Romford
Attendance: 111
Referee: Jason Richardson
26 April 2025
18:00 BST

Chelsea U21s	4–0	Wolverhampton Wanderers U21s
Rak-Sakyi 45'; Murray-Campbell 50'; McNeilly 63' (pen.); Kavuma-McQueen 86'	Report

Kingsmeadow, Kingston upon Thames
Attendance: 265
Referee: William Davis
27 April 2025
14:00 BST

Southampton U21s	5–3 (a.e.t.)	Leicester City U21s
Merry 6'; Robinson 44'; Ehibatiomhan 62'; Sanda 94'; Bragg 113'	Report	Braybrooke 80'; Cartwright 82' (pen.); Evans 85'

St Mary's Stadium, Southampton
Attendance: 165
Referee: Elliott Swallow
28 April 2025
19:00 BST

Crystal Palace U21s	3–1	Brighton & Hove Albion U21s
Mustapha 23'; Umeh 37'; Kporha 56'	Report	Knight 52'

VBS Community Stadium, Sutton
Attendance: 1,000
Referee: Alan Dale
28 April 2025
19:00 BST

Fulham U21s	1–0 (a.e.t.)	Nottingham Forest U21s
Nwoko 93'	Report

Motspur Park, New Malden
Attendance: 105
Referee: James Durkin

==== Quarterfinals ====
2 May 2025
14:00 BST

Crystal Palace U21s	6–0	Chelsea U21s
Mustapha 9', 59'; Cardines 41'; Ola-Adebomi 63', 83'; Marsh 90+5'	Report

VBS Community Stadium, Sutton
Attendance: 510
Referee: Isaac Searle
3 May 2025
13:00 BST

Manchester City U21s	3–2 (a.e.t.)	Arsenal U21s
Muir 76'; Samuel 90+4'; Mubama 106'	Report	Edwards 1'; Copley 50'

Joie Stadium, Manchester
Attendance: 442
Referee: Ross Martin
5 May 2025
10:00 BST

Manchester United U21s	4–1	West Ham United U21s
Scanlon 51'; Wheatley 60'; Murray 78'; Mather 90+2'	Report	Adeile 30'

Leigh Sports Village, Leigh
Attendance: 471
Referee: Jamie O'Connor
5 May 2025
14:00 BST

Southampton U21s	5–2	Fulham U21s
Sanda 23'; Ballard 45+2', 60', 62'; Ehibhatiomhan 85'	Report	Godo 6', 68'

St. Mary's Stadium, Southampton
Attendance: 234
Referee: Sam Mulhall

==== Semifinals ====
10 May 2025
19:00 BST

Manchester City U21s	2–0	Manchester United U21s
Mubama 66', 90'	Report

Joie Stadium, Manchester
Attendance: 866
Referee: Scott Tallis

12 May 2025
19:00 BST

Crystal Palace U21s	1–2 (a.e.t.)	Southampton U21s
Ola-Adebomi 51'	Report	Ballard 32'; Abu 97'

Selhurst Park, Selhurst
Attendance: 740
Referee: James Oldham

==== Final ====
22 May 2025
19:15 BST

Manchester City U21s	2–0	Southampton U21s
Mubama 6'; Muir 39'	Report

Joie Stadium, Manchester
Attendance: 697
Referee: Robert Massey-Ellis

== Statistics ==
=== Top goalscorers ===
As of 22 May 2025

Rank	Player	Club	Goals
1	(England) Divin Mubama	Manchester City U21s	17
2	(England) Donnell McNeilly	Chelsea U21s	13
3	(England) Khayon Edwards	Arsenal U21s	12
3	(England) Ademola Ola-Adebomi	Crystal Palace U21s	12
5	(England) Jake Evans	Leicester City U21s	11
5	(England) Emre Tezgel	Stoke City U21s	11
7	(England) Nathan Butler-Oyedeji	Arsenal U21s	10
7	(Wales) Callum Osmand	Fulham U21s	10
9	(England) Princewill Ehibhatiomhan	Southampton U21s	9
9	(Sierra Leone) Hindolo Mustapha	Crystal Palace U21s	9
9	(England) Sam Mather	Manchester United U21s	9
9	(Belgium) Trey Samuel-Ogunsuyi	Sunderland U21s	9
9	(England) Jemiah Umolu	Crystal Palace U21s	9
9	(England) Ethan Wheatley	Manchester United U21s	9

=== Hat-tricks ===
As of 22 May 2025

Player	For	Against	Result	Date	Ref.
(England) Jimmy-Jay Morgan	Chelsea U21s	Middlesbrough U21s	1–3 (A)	1 September 2024	
(England) Ethan Wheatley	Manchester United U21s	Norwich City U21s	3–5 (A)	27 September 2024	
(England) Verrell George	Reading U21s	Everton U21s	3–3 (A)	30 September 2024	
(England) Caylan Vickers	Brighton & Hove Albion U21s	Crystal Palace U21s	10–0 (H)	5 October 2024	
(England) Hazeem Bakre	Middlesbrough U21s	Aston Villa U21s	4–2 (H)	25 October 2024	
(England) Reigan Heskey	Manchester City U21s	Norwich City U21s	5–0 (H)	1 November 2024	
(England) Jemiah Umolu	Crystal Palace U21s	Tottenham Hotspur U21s	5–1 (H)	1 November 2024	
(Republic of Ireland) Joe Gardner	Nottingham Forest U21s	Everton U21s	2–4 (A)	29 November 2024	
(Morocco) Yusuf Akhamrich	Tottenham Hotspur U21s	Middlesbrough U21s	6–1 (H)	29 November 2024	
(England) Harry Howell	Brighton & Hove Albion U21s	Tottenham Hotspur U21s	5–1 (H)	14 December 2024	
(England) Dominic Ballard	Southampton U21s	Fulham U21s	5–1 (H)	10 January 2025	
(England) Aaron Loupalo-Bi	Fulham U21s	Arsenal U21s	6–3 (H)	18 January 2025	
(England) Emre Tezgel	Stoke City U21s	Reading U21s	1–5 (A)	27 January 2025	
(England) Jake Evans	Leicester City U21s	Newcastle United U21s	3–6 (A)	14 February 2025	
(Belgium) Trey Samuel-Ogunsuyi	Sunderland U21s	Southampton U21s	3–3 (A)	21 February 2025	
(England) Divin Mubama	Manchester City U21s	Chelsea U21s	5–0 (H)	28 February 2025	
(England) Emre Tezgel^{4}	Stoke City U21s	Derby County U21s	5–3 (H)	14 March 2025	
(England) Jaden Williams	Tottenham Hotspur U21s	Blackburn Rovers U21s	4–0 (H)	14 March 2025	
(Northern Ireland) Braiden Graham^{4}	Everton U21s	Tottenham Hotspur U21s	4–5 (A)	15 April 2025	
(England) Dominic Ballard	Southampton U21s	Fulham U21s	5–2 (H)	5 May 2025	

Note

(H) – Home; (A) – Away
^{4} – player scored 4 goals

== Awards ==
=== Player of the Month ===
Month	Player	Club	Ref.
August	(England) Nathan Butler-Oyedeji	Arsenal U21s	
September	(Germany) Farid Alfa-Ruprecht	Manchester City U21s	
October	(England) Kiano Dyer	Chelsea U21s	
November	(Wales) Callum Osmand	Fulham U21s	
December	(England) Harry Howell	Brighton & Hove Albion U21s	
January	(England) Dom Ballard	Southampton U21s	
February	(England) Divin Mubama	Manchester City U21s	
March	(England) Emre Tezgel	Stoke City U21s	
April	(England) Lewis Orford	West Ham United U21s	

=== Player of the Season ===
Player	Club	Ref.
(England) Jahmai Simpson-Pusey	Manchester City U21s	

== Professional Development League ==
Professional Development League 2
- Season: 2024–25
- Champions: Brentford U21s (1st Title)
- Regular Season Champions: AFC Bournemouth U21s (1st Title)
- Matches: 344 (341 RS, 3 PO)
- Goals: 1,318 (3.83 per match) (1303 RS, 15 PO)
- Top goalscorer: (Ghana) Daniel Adu-Adjei AFC Bournemouth U21s (25 Goals) (23 RS, 2 PO)
- Biggest home win: Coventry City U21s 14–0 Colchester United U21s (21 January 2025) Record
- Biggest away win: Queens Park Rangers U21s 0–6 Coventry City U21s (13 August 2024), Queens Park Rangers U21s 0–6 Sheffield United U21s (10 September 2024)
- Highest scoring: Coventry City U21s 14–0 Colchester United U21s (21 January 2025) Record
- Longest winning run: 14 Matches; AFC Bournemouth U21s (7 March 2025 – 12 May 2025)
- Longest unbeaten run: 15 Matches; AFC Bournemouth U21s (3 March 2025 – 12 May 2025)
- Longest winless run: 12 Matches; Colchester United U21s (6 January 2025 – 1 April 2025)
- Longest losing run: 8 Matches; Colchester United U21s (6 January 2025 – 7 March 2025)

The Professional Development League 2 is Under-21 football's second tier, designed for those academies with Category 2 status. The league is split regionally into north and south divisions, with each team facing opponents in their own region twice both home and away and opponents in the other region once resulting in 31 games played. The sides finishing in the top two positions in both regions at the end of the season will progress to a knockout stage to determine the overall league champion. Sheffield United U21s are the defending champions.

22 teams competed in the league this season, one more than the previous season and the most since the league's inaugural season in 2012-13. Brentford U21s returned to the league after nine years their academy was given Category Two status.

=== Tables ===
==== North Division ====
Pos	Team	Pld	W	D	L	GF	GA	GD	Pts	Qualification
1	Sheffield United U21s (R)	31	19	7	5	82	36	+46	64	Qualification for Knock-out stage
2	Burnley U21s	31	19	2	10	89	38	+51	59	Qualification for Knock-out stage
3	Coventry City U21s	31	16	3	12	73	53	+20	51	
4	Hull City U21s	31	17	0	14	61	56	+5	51	
5	Sheffield Wednesday U21s	31	13	6	12	51	53	−2	45	
6	Fleetwood Town U21s	31	13	4	14	47	59	−12	43	
7	Peterborough United U21s	31	11	2	18	46	74	−28	35	
8	Birmingham City U21s	31	9	4	18	51	82	−31	31	
9	Barnsley U21s	31	7	9	15	43	62	−19	30	
10	Wigan Athletic U21s	31	7	5	19	48	66	−18	26	
11	Crewe Alexandra U21s	31	6	7	18	39	76	−37	25	

Source: Professional Development League table
(R) Regional League Champions

==== South Division ====
Pos	Team	Pld	W	D	L	GF	GA	GD	Pts	Qualification
1	AFC Bournemouth U21s (R)	31	21	4	6	88	49	+39	67	Qualification for Knock-out stage
2	Brentford U21s (C)	31	21	4	6	74	46	+28	67	Qualification for Knock-out stage
3	Millwall U21s	31	20	6	5	69	36	+33	66	
4	Charlton Athletic U21s	31	17	7	7	88	45	+43	58	
5	Ipswich Town U21s	31	12	8	11	63	65	−2	44	
6	Cardiff City U21s	31	13	5	13	43	52	−9	44	
7	Swansea City U21s	31	13	4	14	57	58	−1	43	
8	Bristol City U21s	31	11	7	13	64	66	−2	40	
9	Watford U21s	31	11	5	15	55	62	−7	38	
10	Queens Park Rangers U21s	31	8	4	19	48	76	−28	28	
11	Colchester United U21s	31	3	5	23	24	93	−69	14	

Source: Professional Development League table
(C) Champions; (R) Regional League Champions

=== Results ===
Home \ Away	BAR	BIR	BUR	COV	CRE	FLE	HUL	PET	SHU	SHW	WIG	BOU	BRE	BRI	CAR	CHA	COL	IPS	MIL	QPR	SWA	WAT
Barnsley U21s	—	2–2	0–4	2–4	2–0	3–3	1–0	3–4	1–1	1–3	2–2	—	—	0–4	—	0–4	—	1–2	—	4–0	—	1–1
Birmingham City U21s	2–3	—	0–2	2–0	0–0	3–2	1–2	0–0	2–2	3–1	1–3	3–4	—	—	3–4	—	0–3	—	4–1	—	1–5	—
Burnley U21s	3–1	8–1	—	5–0	3–1	0–2	4–0	5–0	0–1	0–2	1–3	—	1–2	—	—	0–4	—	3–3	—	6–0	—	4–1
Coventry City U21s	2–2	8–0	2–6	—	3–0	1–2	0–4	0–2	0–0	3–0	2–1	2–4	—	3–2	—	—	14–0	—	3–4	—	2–1	—
Crewe Alexandra U21s	2–2	4–2	0–5	0–1	—	3–3	3–4	2–0	1–2	3–2	1–1	—	0–2	—	4–2	—	—	0–3	—	0–1	—	3–0
Fleetwood Town U21s	2–1	0–3	0–3	1–2	3–2	—	1–3	5–0	3–1	2–1	2–0	1–4	—	2–1	—	0–4	—	—	2–1	—	3–1	—
Hull City U21s	2–1	5–0	1–4	0–2	4–1	5–1	—	4–1	0–3	2–1	3–1	—	2–1	—	2–0	—	4–0	—	—	3–1	—	1–3
Peterborough United U21s	0–1	2–4	2–5	3–2	0–1	3–2	3–1	—	2–1	1–3	3–0	3–0	—	4–2	—	2–7	—	2–3	—	—	1–2	—
Sheffield United U21s	0–0	5–2	1–0	3–4	10–1	5–1	3–1	5–1	—	2–1	2–1	—	6–0	—	2–0	—	3–0	—	1–1	—	—	8–2
Sheffield Wednesday U21s	2–0	2–1	3–2	1–0	1–1	0–1	3–4	3–0	0–2	—	2–1	2–2	—	4–4	—	0–5	—	1–3	—	4–3	—	—
Wigan Athletic U21s	0–2	1–2	0–2	1–2	4–1	2–0	2–0	2–2	2–3	1–3	—	—	1–1	—	1–3	—	4–1	—	1–2	—	3–1	—
AFC Bournemouth U21s	4–3	—	3–2	—	4–3	—	2–0	—	3–1	—	5–2	—	8–1	2–0	4–0	2–3	2–0	7–0	3–1	2–5	4–0	4–1
Brentford U21s	3–0	2–0	—	1–0	—	2–0	—	2–1	—	1–1	—	3–0	—	4–3	0–1	3–2	3–2	5–2	3–1	4–1	3–0	2–2
Bristol City U21s	—	2–1	1–3	—	2–0	—	4–2	—	1–1	—	4–2	5–0	0–4	—	1–1	0–0	3–0	2–2	2–2	2–1	3–4	3–2
Cardiff City U21s	1–0	—	1–4	1–1	—	2–0	—	4–0	—	0–1	—	0–0	0–3	4–1	—	2–0	1–1	2–2	1–2	2–1	2–1	3–1
Charlton Athletic U21s	—	3–1	—	0–1	1–1	—	6–0	—	1–1	—	4–2	1–2	1–6	1–1	6–1	—	8–1	2–2	1–0	6–3	3–1	2–1
Colchester United U21s	1–3	—	0–3	—	1–1	0–0	—	0–1	—	0–1	—	0–4	1–2	4–2	0–1	2–2	—	1–2	0–1	2–3	2–0	0–3
Ipswich Town U21s	—	6–1	—	4–1	—	1–2	0–2	—	0–1	—	2–2	1–2	1–2	3–4	5–1	1–5	1–1	—	3–3	3–2	3–2	2–1
Millwall U21s	4–1	—	1–1	—	4–0	—	2–0	2–1	—	1–1	—	2–0	3–0	3–2	2–0	2–0	3–0	3–0	—	0–0	5–0	4–2
Queens Park Rangers U21s	—	0–2	—	0–6	—	1–1	—	2–0	0–6	—	3–1	1–4	1–5	0–1	2–1	2–2	7–0	2–3	0–2	—	1–3	0–0
Swansea City U21s	0–0	—	2–0	—	4–0	—	1–0	—	5–0	3–1	—	2–2	3–3	2–0	0–1	3–1	4–1	0–0	3–4	0–5	—	1–3
Watford U21s	—	0–4	—	1–2	—	1–0	—	1–2	—	1–1	4–1	1–1	2–1	5–2	2–1	2–3	7–0	2–0	1–3	1–0	1–3	—

Source: Professional Development League Results
Legend: Blue = home team win; Yellow = draw; Red = away team win.

=== Knock-out stage ===
Semi-finals

12 May 2025
13:00 BST

Sheffield United U21s	1–2 (a.e.t.)	Brentford U21s
Atherton 70'	Report	Fredrick 45+3'; Morgan 101'

Eco-Power Stadium, Doncaster
12 May 2025
19:00 BST

AFC Bournemouth U21s	4–3	Burnley U21s
McDermott 7' (o.g.); Clarke 34'; Rees-Dottin 48'; Adu-Adjei 62'	Report	Bauress 3'; McDermott 88'; Westley 90+4'

Vitality Stadium, Bournemouth

Professional Development League National Final

21 May 2025
19:00 BST

AFC Bournemouth U21s	2–3	Brentford U21s
Adu-Adjei 23'; William 62'	Report	Morgan 52'; Donovan 56'; Yogane 87'

Vitality Stadium, Bournemouth
Attendance: 2,033

=== Top goalscorers ===
As of 21 May 2025

Rank	Player	Club	Goals
1	(Ghana) Daniel Adu-Adjei	AFC Bournemouth U21s	25
2	(Wales) Iwan Morgan	Brentford U21s	19
3	(Scotland) Jevan Beattie	Sheffield United U21s	16
4	(England) Ashley Clarke	AFC Bournemouth U21s	13
4	(England) Kamarni Ryan	Burnley U21s	13
6	(Jamaica) Kaheim Dixon	Charlton Athletic U21s	12
6	(Northern Ireland) Devlan Moses	Sheffield Wednesday U21s	12
6	(England) Tyrell Sellars-Fleming	Hull City U21s	12
6	(England) Tom Taylor	Ipswich Town U21s	12
10	(Wales) Morgan Bates	Swansea City U21s	11
10	(Republic of Ireland) Patrick Casey	Charlton Athletic U21s	11
10	(England) Henry Rylah	Charlton Athletic U21s	11
10	(England) Ashley Hay	Brentford U21s	11
10	(England) Olly Thomas	Bristol City U21s	11
10	(England) Joe Westley	Burnley U21s	11

=== Hat-tricks ===
As of 21 May 2025

Player	For	Against	Result	Date	Ref.
(Republic of Ireland) Glory Nzingo	Swansea City U21s	Crewe Alexandra U21s	4–0 (H)	12 August 2024	
(Portugal) Fábio Tavares	Coventry City U21s	Millwall U21s	3–4 (H)	20 August 2024	
(England) Ben Wodskou	Birmingham City U21s	Cardiff City U21s	3–4 (H)	30 August 2024	
(England) Tyrese Campbell	Sheffield United U21s	Watford U21s	8–2 (H)	2 September 2024	
(England) Ashley Hay	Brentford U21s	Charlton Athletic U21s	1–6 (A)	1 October 2024	
(Belgium) Norman Bassette^{4}	Coventry City U21s	Birmingham City U21s	8–0 (H)	15 October 2024	
(England) Jordan Hodkin	Crewe Alexandra U21s	Birmingham City U21s	4–2 (H)	21 October 2024	
(England) Ashley Hay	Brentford U21s	Queens Park Rangers U21s	4–1 (H)	28 October 2024	
(Scotland) Ryan Oné	Sheffield United U21s	Crewe Alexandra U21s	10–1 (H)	29 October 2024	
(England) Kai Enslin	Charlton Athletic U21s	Queens Park Rangers U21s	6–3 (H)	3 December 2024	
(England) Joe Westley^{4}	Burnley U21s	Birmingham City U21s	8–1 (H)	3 December 2024	
(England) Ashley Clarke	AFC Bournemouth U21s	Colchester United U21s	0–4 (A)	17 January 2025	
(England) Charlie Finney	Coventry City U21s	Colchester United U21s	14–0 (H)	21 January 2025	
(United States) Aidan Dausch^{5}	Coventry City U21s	Colchester United U21s	14–0 (H)	21 January 2025	
(England) Tyrell Sellars-Fleming	Hull City U21s	Birmingham City U21s	5–0 (H)	7 February 2025	
(England) Connor Wickham	Watford U21s	Colchester United U21s	0–3 (A)	7 February 2025	
(Wales) Iwan Morgan	Brentford U21s	Ipswich Town U21s	5–2 (H)	17 February 2025	
(England) Kieran Petrie	Queens Park Rangers U21s	Swansea City U21s	0–5 (A)	17 February 2025	
(Nigeria) Emmanuel Fernandez	Peterborough United U21s	Hull City U21s	3–1 (H)	17 February 2025	
(Scotland) Jevan Beattie	Sheffield United U21s	Birmingham City U21s	5–2 (H)	4 March 2025	
(Ghana) Daniel Adu-Adjei	AFC Bournemouth U21s	Brentford U21s	8–1 (H)	25 March 2025	
(Northern Ireland) Devlan Moses	Sheffield Wednesday U21s	Queens Park Rangers U21s	4–3 (H)	7 April 2025	
(England) Frankie Baker	Millwall U21s	Crewe Alexandra U21s	4–0 (H)	15 April 2025	
(England) Olly Thomas	Bristol City U21s	Swansea City U21s	3–4 (H)	18 April 2025	
(Ghana) Daniel Adu-Adjei	AFC Bournemouth U21s	Ipswich Town U21s	7–0 (H)	21 April 2025	
(Scotland) Jevan Beattie	Sheffield United U21s	Peterborough United U21s	5–1 (H)	25 April 2025	
(Wales) Morgan Bates	Swansea City U21s	Birmingham City U21s	1–5 (A)	28 April 2025	
(Ghana) Daniel Adu-Adjei	AFC Bournemouth U21s	Wigan Athletic U21s	5–2 (H)	4 May 2025	

Note

(H) – Home; (A) – Away
^{4} – player scored 4 goals ^{5} – player scored 5 goals
