= 2025–26 1. FC Köln season =

1. FC Köln
2025–26 season
- Manager: Lukas Kwasniok (until 22 March); René Wagner (interim)
- Stadium: RheinEnergieStadion
- Bundesliga: 14th
- DFB-Pokal: Second round
- Top goalscorer: League: Said El Mala (13); All: Said El Mala (13)
- Highest home attendance: 50,000
- Lowest home attendance: 49,000
- Average home league attendance: 49,907
- Biggest win: 1. FC Köln 4–1 SC Freiburg; 31 August 2025, Bundesliga
- Biggest defeat: 1. FC Köln 1–4 Bayern Munich; 29 October 2025, DFB-Pokal
Home colours	Away colours	Third colours

The 2025–26 season was the 78th season in the history of 1. FC Köln. In addition to the domestic league, the club participated in the DFB-Pokal.

== Players ==
=== Current squad ===
As of 3 September 2025

Note: Flags indicate national team as defined under FIFA eligibility rules; some limited exceptions apply. Players may hold more than one non-FIFA nationality.

No.	Pos.	Nation	Player
1	GK	GER	Marvin Schwäbe (captain)
2	DF	SUI	Joël Schmied
3	DF	GER	Dominique Heintz
4	DF	GER	Timo Hübers
5	MF	GER	Tom Krauß (on loan from Mainz 05)
6	MF	GER	Eric Martel
7	FW	GER	Luca Waldschmidt
8	MF	BIH	Denis Huseinbašić
9	FW	GER	Ragnar Ache
11	MF	AUT	Florian Kainz
13	MF	GER	Said El Mala
15	DF	GER	Luca Kilian
16	FW	POL	Jakub Kamiński (on loan from VfL Wolfsburg)
17	MF	BEL	Alessio Castro-Montes

No.	Pos.	Nation	Player
18	MF	ISL	Ísak Bergmann Jóhannesson
19	FW	GER	Malek El Mala
20	GK	GER	Ron-Robert Zieler
25	DF	BIH	Jusuf Gazibegović
28	DF	NOR	Sebastian Sebulonsen
29	FW	GER	Jan Thielmann
30	FW	GER	Marius Bülter
32	DF	USA	Kristoffer Lund (on loan from Palermo)
33	DF	NED	Rav van den Berg
34	MF	GER	Fayssal Harchaoui
37	MF	GER	Linton Maina
39	DF	TUR	Cenk Özkacar (on loan from Valencia)
44	GK	GER	Matthias Köbbing
46	MF	BIH	Emin Kujović

== Transfers ==
=== In ===
Pos.	Player	From	Fee	Date	Source
FW	(Germany) Ragnar Ache	(Germany) 1. FC Kaiserslautern	€4,100,000	1 July 2025	
MF	(Iceland) Isak Bergmann Jóhannesson	(Germany) Fortuna Düsseldorf	€5,600,000	1 July 2025	
GK	(Germany) Ron-Robert Zieler	(Germany) Hannover 96	€210,000	8 July 2025	
DF	(Norway) Sebastian Sebulonsen	(Denmark) Brøndby IF	€2,600,000	18 July 2025	
FW	(Germany) Marius Bülter	(Germany) TSG Hoffenheim	€1,100,000	1 August 2025	
DF	(Netherlands) Rav van den Berg	(England) Middlesbrough	€7,500,000	13 August 2025	
MF	(Belgium) Alessio Castro-Montes	(Belgium) Union Saint-Gilloise	€2,100,000	1 September 2025	

=== Loans in ===
Pos.	Player	From	Date	Until	Source
DF	(Poland) Jakub Kamiński	(Germany) VfL Wolfsburg	4 July 2025	End of season	
MF	(Germany) Tom Krauß	(Germany) Mainz 05	5 July 2025	End of season	
DF	(United States) Kristoffer Lund	(Italy) Palermo	5 August 2025	End of season	
DF	(Turkey) Cenk Özkacar	(Spain) Valencia	9 August 2025	End of season	
DF	(England) Jahmai Simpson-Pusey	(England) Manchester City	6 January 2026	End of season	
MF	(Peru) Felipe Chávez	(Germany) Bayern Munich	2 February 2026	End of season	

=== Out ===
Pos.	Player	To	Fee	Date	Source
DF	(Germany) Max Finkgräfe	(Germany) RB Leipzig	€4,100,000	3 July 2025	
FW	(United States) Damion Downs	(England) Southampton	€8,100,000	9 July 2025	

=== Loans out ===
Pos.	Player	To	Date	Until	Source
DF	(Denmark) Rasmus Carstensen	(Denmark) AGF	7 July 2025	End of season	
FW	(Slovenia) Jaka Čuber Potočnik	(Germany) Rot-Weiss Essen	10 July 2025	End of season	
DF	(Germany) Julian Pauli	(Germany) Dynamo Dresden	29 August 2025	End of season	
FW	(Bosnia and Herzegovina) Imad Rondić	(Poland) Raków Częstochowa	3 September 2025	End of season	
FW	(Bosnia and Herzegovina) Imad Rondić	(Germany) SC Preußen Münster	27 January 2026	End of season	

=== Released ===
Pos.	Player	Date	Source
MF	(Germany) Tim Lemperle	29 May 2025	
MF	(Luxembourg) Mathias Olesen	29 May 2025	
FW	(Germany) Marvin Obuz	29 May 2025	
MF	(Austria) Dejan Ljubičić	29 May 2025	
GK	(Germany) Philipp Pentke	29 May 2025	
FW	(Germany) Mark Uth	29 May 2025	

== Competitions ==
=== Overall record ===
Competition	First match	Last match	Starting round	Record							
Competition	First match	Last match	Starting round	Pld	W	D	L	GF	GA	GD	Win %
Bundesliga	24 August 2025	16 May 2026	Matchday 1	34	7	11	16	49	63	−14	20.59
DFB-Pokal	17 August 2025	29 October 2025	First Round	2	1	0	1	3	5	−2	50.00
Total				36	8	11	17	52	68	−16	22.22

Last updated: 16 May 2026
Source: DFB

=== Bundesliga ===
==== League table ====
Pos	Team	Pld	W	D	L	GF	GA	GD	Pts	Qualification or relegation
12	Borussia Mönchengladbach	34	9	11	14	42	53	−11	38	
13	Hamburger SV	34	9	11	14	40	54	−14	38	
14	1. FC Köln	34	7	11	16	49	63	−14	32	
15	Werder Bremen	34	8	8	18	37	60	−23	32	
16	VfL Wolfsburg (R)	34	7	8	19	45	69	−24	29	Qualification for the relegation play-offs

Source: Bundesliga
Rules for classification: 1) Points; 2) Goal difference; 3) Goals scored; 4) Head-to-head results; 5) Head-to-head away goals scored; 6) Away goals scored; 7) Play-off.
(Rules 4–6 only apply after home and away matches have been played between the tied teams.)
(R) Relegated

==== Results summary ====
Overall								Home						Away					
Pld	W	D	L	GF	GA	GD	Pts	W	D	L	GF	GA	GD	W	D	L	GF	GA	GD
34	7	11	16	49	63	−14	32	5	4	8	30	30	0	2	7	8	19	33	−14

Last updated: 16 May 2026.
Source: Bundesliga

==== Results by round ====
Round	1	2	3	4	5	6	7	8	9	10	11	12	13	14	15	16	17	18	19	20	21	22	23	24	25	26	27	28	29	30	31	32	33	34
Ground	A	H	A	A	H	A	H	A	H	A	H	A	H	A	H	A	H	H	A	H	H	A	H	A	H	A	H	A	H	A	H	A	H	A
Result	W	W	D	L	L	W	D	L	W	L	L	D	D	L	L	D	L	W	L	W	L	L	D	L	L	D	D	D	W	D	L	D	L	L
Position	7	3	3	4	7	6	6	8	7	9	10	10	8	10	11	11	12	10	10	10	10	11	12	13	13	14	15	15	13	12	14	14	14	14
Points	3	6	7	7	7	10	11	11	14	14	14	15	16	16	16	17	17	20	20	23	23	23	24	24	24	25	26	27	30	31	31	32	32	32

Updated to match(es) played on 16 May 2026. Source: Bundesliga standings & results – Bundesliga.com
A = Away; H = Home; W = Win; D = Draw; L = Loss

==== Matches ====
24 August 2025 Matchday 1	Mainz 05	0–1	1. FC Köln	Mainz
15:30 CEST (UTC+2)	Feil (yellow card) 29'; Gerezgiher (yellow card) 48'; Asllani 46' (yellow card) 67'; Schmahl 62'	Report	Huseinbasic 22'; Martel (yellow card) 45+4'; Heintz (yellow card) 60'; Hübers 84'	Stadium: MEWA Arena; Attendance: 9,502; Referee: Tom Bauer

31 August 2025 Matchday 2	1. FC Köln	4–1	SC Freiburg	Cologne
20:30 CEST (UTC+2)	Kamiński 35'; Martel (yellow card) 41'; Bülter 47'; Schmied (yellow card) 55'; El Mala 81'	Report	Manzambi (yellow card) 29'; Eggestein 84'	Stadium: RheinEnergieStadion; Attendance: 50,000; Referee: Tobias Reichel

13 September 2025 Matchday 3	Wolfsburg	3–3	1. FC Köln	Wolfsburg
15:30 CEST (UTC+2)	Amoura 42'; Majer 65' (yellow card) 68'; Grabara (yellow card) 86'; Arnold 90+9'	Report	Waldschmidt 5'; Zieler (yellow card) 69'; Schmied (yellow card) 72'; Johannesson (yellow card) 84' (goal) 90+1'; Kaminski 90+14'	Stadium: Volkswagen Arena; Attendance: 61,426; Referee: Sven Jablonski

20 September 2025 Matchday 4	RB Leipzig	3–1	1. FC Köln	Leipzig
18:30 CEST (UTC+2)	Ouedraogo 13'; Cruz 44'; Raum 45+4'; Baku (yellow card) 69'	Report	Thielmann 23'; Martel (yellow card) 45+3'	Stadium: Red Bull Arena; Attendance: 47,117; Referee: Benjamin Brand

28 September 2025 Matchday 5	1. FC Köln	1–2	VfB Stuttgart	Cologne
17:30 CEST (UTC+2)	Kaminski 4'; Schmied (yellow card) 67'; Krauß (yellow card) 76'		Demirović 28' (pen.); Jaquez (yellow card) 78'; Vagnoman 81'; Bouanani (yellow card) 90+1'	Stadium: RheinEnergieStadion; Referee: Matthias Jöllenbeck

3 October 2025 Matchday 6	TSG 1899 Hoffenheim	0–1	1. FC Köln	Sinsheim
20:30 CEST (UTC+2)	Touré (yellow card) 10'; Bernardo (yellow card) 20'; Burger (yellow card) 39'	Report	El Mala 16'; Sebulonsen (yellow card) 90+4'	Stadium: PreZero Arena; Attendance: 30,150; Referee: Felix Zwayer

18 October 2025 Matchday 7	1. FC Köln	1–1	FC Augsburg	Cologne
15:30 CEST (UTC+2)	Jóhannesson (yellow card) 61'; Thielmann (yellow card) 64'; El Mala 76'	Report	Kade (yellow card) 7'; Jakić (yellow card) 20'; Rieder 54'; Sandro Wagner (yellow card) 63'	Stadium: RheinEnergieStadion; Attendance: 50,000; Referee: Timo Gerach

25 October 2025 Matchday 8	Borussia Dortmund	1–0	1. FC Köln	Dortmund
18:30 CEST (UTC+2)	Guirassy (yellow card) 63'; Beier (yellow card) 90+1' (goal) 90+6'	Report	Jóhannesson (yellow card) 44'; Sebulonsen (yellow card) 45'	Stadium: Signal Iduna Park; Attendance: 81,365; Referee: Benjamin Brand

2 November 2025 Matchday 9	1. FC Köln	4–1	Hamburger SV	Cologne
15:30 CET (UTC+1)	Ache 25'; Kainz 48'; Bülter (yellow card) 78'; El Mala 90+4'; Kamiński 90+9'	Report	Remberg (yellow card) 10'; Dompé 61'; Vieira (yellow card) 74' (yellow-red card) 83'; Pherai (yellow card) 78' (yellow-red card) 79'; Poulsen (yellow card) 79'; Polzin (yellow card) 84'	Stadium: RheinEnergieStadion; Attendance: 50,000; Referee: Daniel Schlager

8 November 2025 Matchday 10	Borussia Mönchengladbach	3–1	1. FC Köln	Mönchengladbach
18:30 CET (UTC+1)	Reitz (yellow card) 11'; Sander 45+2'; Diks 61' (pen.), (yellow card) 75'; Tabaković 64'	Report	Huseinbašić (yellow card) 34'; Waldschmidt 90+2' (pen.); Sebulonsen (yellow card) 75'; Ache (yellow card) 75'	Stadium: Borussia-Park; Attendance: 54,042; Referee: Deniz Aytekin

22 November 2025 Matchday 11	1. FC Köln	3–3	Eintracht Frankfurt	Cologne
18:30 CET (UTC+1)	Kaminski 4'; Bülter 83'; Waldschmidt 90+4'	Report	Theate 39'; Dahoud 45+6'; Burkardt 59', 63'	Stadium: RheinEnergieStadion; Attendance: 50,000; Referee: Florian Badstübner

29 November 2025 Matchday 12	SV Werder Bremen	1–1	1. FC Köln	Bremen
15:30 CET (UTC+1)	Friedl 22'; Stark (yellow card) 75' (yellow-red card) 90+6'	Report	Castro-Montes (yellow card) 39'; Thielmann (yellow card) 75'; Martel (yellow card) 78'; El Mala 90+1'; Bulter (yellow card) 90+6'	Stadium: Weser-Stadion; Attendance: 41,800; Referee: Bastian Dankert

6 December 2025 Matchday 13	1. FC Köln	1–1	FC St. Pauli	Cologne
15:30 CET (UTC+1)	El Mala 51'	Report	Jones 90+4', (yellow card) 90+5'	Stadium: RheinEnergieStadion; Attendance: 50,000; Referee: Tobias Reichel

13 December 2025 Matchday 14	Bayer 04 Leverkusen	2–0	1. FC Köln	Leverkusen
18:30 CET (UTC+1)	Arthur (yellow card) 51'; Terrier 66'; Andrich 72'; Quansah (yellow card) 74'	Report	Martel (yellow card) 5'	Stadium: BayArena; Attendance: 30,210; Referee: Harm Osmers

20 December 2025 Matchday 15	1. FC Köln	0–1	1. FC Union Berlin	Cologne
15:30 CET (UTC+1)	Sebulonsen (yellow card) 13'; Krauß (yellow card) 49'; van den Berg (red card) 82'	Report	Trimmel (yellow card) 40'; Kemlein (yellow card) 80'; Schäfer (yellow card) 88', (goal) 90+1'; Juranović (yellow card) 90+4'; Rønnow (yellow card) 90+8'	Stadium: RheinEnergieStadion; Attendance: 50,000; Referee: Christian Dingert

10 January 2026 Matchday 16	1. FC Heidenheim 1846	2–2	1. FC Köln	Heidenheim an der Brenz
15:30 CET (UTC+1)	Pieringer 15'; Niehues 26'; Ibrahimović (yellow card) 44'; Föhrenbach (yellow card) 52'	Report	Martel 18', (yellow card) 21'; El Mala 48'	Stadium: Voith-Arena; Attendance: 15,000; Referee: Robert Schröder

14 January 2026 Matchday 17	1. FC Köln	1–3	FC Bayern Munich	Cologne
18:30 CET (UTC+1)	Maina 41'	Report	Gnabry 45+5'; Kim 71'; Karl 84'	Stadium: RheinEnergieStadion; Attendance: 50,000; Referee: Patrick Ittrich

17 January 2026 Matchday 18	1. FC Köln	2–1	1. FSV Mainz 05	Cologne
15:30 CET (UTC+1)	Martel (yellow card) 18'; Ache 57', 85'; El Mala (yellow card) 72'; Bülter (yellow card) 72'; Krauß (yellow card) 87'	Report	Bell 29'; Lee (yellow card) 43'; Widmer (yellow card) 61'; Batz (yellow card) 72'; Tietz (yellow card) 72'	Stadium: RheinEnergieStadion; Attendance: 50,000; Referee: Felix Zwayer

25 January 2026 Matchday 19	SC Freiburg	2–1	1. FC Köln	Freiburg im Breisgau
17:30 CET (UTC+1)	Scherhant 11' (yellow card) 74'; Matanović 44'	Report	Rosenfelder 10' (o.g.); Krauß (yellow card) 62'; Castro-Montes (yellow card) 69'	Stadium: Europa-Park Stadion; Attendance: 34,700; Referee: Bastian Dankert

31 January 2026 Matchday 20	1. FC Köln	1–0	VfL Wolfsburg	Cologne
20:30 CET (UTC+1)	Maina 29'; Ache (yellow card) 58'	Report	Eriksen (yellow card) 66'; Shiogai (yellow card) 71'; Jenz (yellow card) 80'; Gerhardt (yellow card) 90'	Stadium: RheinEnergieStadion; Attendance: 50,000; Referee: Martin Petersen

8 February 2026 Matchday 21	1. FC Köln	1–2	RB Leipzig	Cologne
15:30 CET (UTC+1)	Thielmann 51' (yellow card) 59'	Report	Baumgartner 29', 56' (yellow card) 77'; Raum (yellow card) 77'; Banzuzi (yellow card) 90+1'; Gulácsi (yellow card) 90+4'	Stadium: RheinEnergieStadion; Attendance: 49,000; Referee: Frank Willenborg

14 February 2026 Matchday 22	VfB Stuttgart	3–1	1. FC Köln	Stuttgart
18:30 CET (UTC+1)	Demirović 15', 84' (yellow card) 60'; Führich (yellow card) 29'; Chabot (yellow card) 53'; El Khannouss (yellow card) 76'; Undav 90+2'	Report	Ache 79'; Kamiński (yellow card) 90+5'	Stadium: MHPArena; Attendance: 60,000; Referee: Robert Hartmann

21 February 2026 Matchday 23	1. FC Köln	2–2	TSG 1899 Hoffenheim	Cologne
15:30 CET (UTC+1)	Ache 15'; El Mala 63'; Özkacar (yellow card) 78'	Report	Hajdari (yellow card) 42'; Kabak 45'; Kramarić 60'; Coufal (yellow card) 75'; Moerstedt (yellow card) 90+5'	Stadium: RheinEnergieStadion; Attendance: 49,600; Referee: Robert Schröder

27 February 2026 Matchday 24	FC Augsburg	2–0	1. FC Köln	Augsburg
18:30 CET (UTC+1)	Massengo (yellow card) 15'; Banks (yellow card) 47'; Ribeiro 55'; Zesiger (yellow card) 66'; Keitel (yellow card) 90+2'; Claude-Maurice 90+5'	Report	Martel (yellow card) 31'	Stadium: WWK Arena; Attendance: 30,660; Referee: Tobias Welz

7 March 2026 Matchday 25	1. FC Köln	1–2	Borussia Dortmund	Cologne
18:30 CET (UTC+1)	Simpson-Pusey (red card) 45+2'; Martel (yellow card) 86'; Kamiński 88'	Report	Guirassy 16'; Bensebaini (yellow card) 45+5'; Beier 60'	Stadium: RheinEnergieStadion; Attendance: 50,000; Referee: Daniel Siebert

14 March 2026 Matchday 26	Hamburger SV	1–1	1. FC Köln	Hamburg
18:30 CET (UTC+1)	Vieira 39'; Remberg (yellow card) 41'; Muheim (yellow card) 90+6'	Report	El Mala (yellow card) 32' (goal) 45'; Hansen (yellow card) 36'; Kamiński (yellow card) 76'; Sebulonsen (yellow card) 90+8'	Stadium: Volksparkstadion; Attendance: 57,000; Referee: Tobias Welz

21 March 2026 Matchday 27	1. FC Köln	3–3	Borussia Mönchengladbach	Cologne
15:30 CET (UTC+1)	El Mala 4'; Ache 7'; Jóhannesson (yellow card) 38'; Schwäbe (yellow card) 52'; Kamiński (yellow card) 61'; Özkacar (yellow card) 71'; Martel (yellow card) 73' (yellow-red card) 86' (goal) 84'; Kainz (yellow card) 90+1'	Report	Castrop 1', 60'; Sander 20'; Tabaković (yellow card) 71'; Reitz (yellow card) 90'	Stadium: RheinEnergieStadion; Referee: Sören Storks

5 April 2026 Matchday 28	Eintracht Frankfurt	2–2	1. FC Köln	Frankfurt
17:30 CEST (UTC+2)	Knauff (yellow card) 22'; Burkardt 66'; Kalimuendo 69'	Report	Kamiński 70' (yellow card) 90+6'; Castro-Montes 83'; Waldschmidt (yellow card) 90'	Stadium: Deutsche Bank Park; Attendance: 59,300; Referee: Florian Exner

11 April 2026 Matchday 29	1. FC Köln	3–1	SV Werder Bremen	Cologne
15:30 CEST (UTC+2)	El Mala 7' (pen.); Ache 65' (yellow card) 71'; Simpson-Pusey (yellow card) 84'; Martel (yellow card) 90+1'; Jóhannesson 90+7'	Report	Friedl (red card) 24'; Schmid 76' (pen.); Bittencourt (yellow card) 78'; Pieper (yellow card) 90'	Stadium: RheinEnergieStadion; Attendance: 50,000; Referee: Tobias Reichel

17 April 2026 Matchday 30	FC St. Pauli	1–1	1. FC Köln	Hamburg
18:30 CEST (UTC+2)	Mets 69'; Hountondji (yellow card) 71'; Ando (yellow card) 76'; Pereira Lage (yellow card) 87'; Sinani (yellow card) 90+6'	Report	Waldschmidt 86' (pen.); El Mala (yellow card) 87'	Stadium: Millerntor-Stadion; Attendance: 29,546; Referee: Matthias Jöllenbeck

25 April 2026 Matchday 31	1. FC Köln	1–2	Bayer 04 Leverkusen	Cologne
15:30 CEST (UTC+2)	Jóhannesson (yellow card) 45'; Waldschmidt 77'	Report	Tapsoba (yellow card) 10'; Schick 43' (pen.), 52'; Blaswich (yellow card) 90+5'	Stadium: RheinEnergieStadion; Attendance: 50,000; Referee: Robert Hartmann

2 May 2026 Matchday 32	1. FC Union Berlin	2–2	1. FC Köln	Berlin
15:30 CEST (UTC+2)	Leite (yellow card) 34'; Rothe 73'; Burcu 89' (yellow card) 90+6'	Report	Martel (yellow card) 31'; Bülter 33'; Simpson-Pusey (yellow card) 55'; El Mala 61'; Schwäbe (yellow card) 89'	Stadium: Stadion An der Alten Försterei; Attendance: 22,012; Referee: Daniel Schlager

10 May 2026 Matchday 33	1. FC Köln	1–3	1. FC Heidenheim 1846	Cologne
17:30 CEST (UTC+2)	Bülter 10'; El Mala (yellow card) 55'; Jóhannesson (yellow card) 89'	Report	Schöppner 8', 72'; Ibrahimović 28'; Dinkçi (yellow card) 30'; Zivzivadze (yellow card) 37'	Stadium: RheinEnergieStadion; Referee: Sven Jablonski

16 May 2026 Matchday 34	FC Bayern Munich	5–1	1. FC Köln	Munich
15:30 CEST (UTC+2)	Kane 10', 13', 69'; Bischof 22'; Laimer (yellow card) 37'; Jackson 83'	Report	El Mala 18'; Schmied (yellow card) 34'	Stadium: Allianz Arena; Attendance: 75,000; Referee: Deniz Aytekin

=== DFB-Pokal ===
17 August 2025 First Round	Jahn Regensburg	1–2	1. FC Köln	Regensburg
15:30	Benedikt Bauer 66'	Report	Martel 90+6' (yellow card) 88'; Jóhannesson 90+8'; Maina (yellow card) 30'	Stadium: Jahnstadion Regensburg; Attendance: 13,396; Referee: Christian Dingert

29 October 2025 Second Round	1. FC Köln	1–4	FC Bayern Munich	Cologne
20:45 CET (UTC+1)	El Mala (yellow card) 3'; Ache 31'	Report	Díaz 36' (yellow card) 45+2'; Kane 38', 64'; Olise 72'; Upamecano (yellow card) 85'	Stadium: RheinEnergieStadion; Attendance: 50,000; Referee: Tobias Welz

== Statistics ==
=== Appearances and goals ===
As of 3 May 2026.

No.	Pos	Nat	Player	Total		Bundesliga		DFB-Pokal	
No.	Pos	Nat	Player	Apps	Goals	Apps	Goals	Apps	Goals
Goalkeepers
1	GK	(Germany) GER	Marvin Schwäbe	32	0	32	0	0	0
20	GK	(Germany) GER	Ron-Robert Zieler	2	0	0	0	2	0
44	GK	(Germany) GER	Matthias Köbbing	0	0	0	0	0	0
Defenders
2	DF	(Switzerland) SUI	Joël Schmied	15	0	11+3	0	1	0
3	DF	(Germany) GER	Dominique Heintz	10	0	7+3	0	0	0
4	DF	(Germany) GER	Timo Hübers	8	0	8	0	0	0
15	DF	(Germany) GER	Luca Kilian	0	0	0	0	0	0
22	DF	(England) ENG	Jahmai Simpson-Pusey	10	0	8+2	0	0	0
25	DF	(Bosnia and Herzegovina) BIH	Jusuf Gazibegović	1	0	1	0	0	0
28	DF	(Norway) NOR	Sebastian Sebulonsen	31	0	26+3	0	2	0
32	DF	(United States) USA	Kristoffer Lund Hansen	33	0	24+7	0	1+1	0
33	DF	(Netherlands) NED	Rav van den Berg	14	0	12+2	0	0	0
36	DF	(Germany) GER	Cenny Neumann	2	0	1+1	0	0	0
39	DF	(Turkey) TUR	Cenk Özkacar	25	0	18+5	0	1+1	0
Midfielders
5	MF	(Germany) GER	Tom Krauß	27	0	19+7	0	1	0
6	MF	(Germany) GER	Eric Martel	32	3	29+1	2	2	1
8	MF	(Bosnia and Herzegovina) BIH	Denis Huseinbašić	16	0	9+6	0	0+1	0
11	MF	(Austria) AUT	Florian Kainz	14	1	0+13	1	0+1	0
13	MF	(Germany) GER	Said El Mala	33	11	18+14	11	1	0
16	DF	(Poland) POL	Jakub Kamiński	34	6	32	6	2	0
17	MF	(Belgium) BEL	Alessio Castro-Montes	11	0	6+5	0	0	0
18	MF	(Iceland) ISL	Ísak Bergmann Jóhannesson	30	3	20+8	2	2	1
27	MF	(Peru) PER	Felipe Chávez	7	0	0+7	0	0	0
34	MF	(Germany) GER	Fayssal Harchaoui	0	0	0	0	0	0
37	MF	(Germany) GER	Linton Maina	22	2	8+13	2	0+1	0
46	MF	(Bosnia and Herzegovina) BIH	Emin Kujović	0	0	0	0	0	0
Forwards
7	FW	(Germany) GER	Luca Waldschmidt	23	5	7+15	5	0+1	0
9	FW	(Germany) GER	Ragnar Ache	31	8	18+11	7	2	1
19	FW	(Germany) GER	Malek El Mala	0	0	0	0	0	0
21	FW	(Germany) GER	Steffen Tigges	3	0	0+3	0	0	0
23	FW	(Armenia) ARM	Sargis Adamyan	0	0	0	0	0	0
29	FW	(Germany) GER	Jan Thielmann	25	3	20+5	3	0	0
30	FW	(Germany) GER	Marius Bülter	31	3	16+13	3	2	0
38	FW	(Germany) GER	Youssoupha Niang	5	0	0+5	0	0	0
40	FW	(Germany) GER	Fynn Schenten	7	0	0+7	0	0	0
Players transferred out during the season
24	DF	(Germany) GER	Julian Pauli	0	0	0	0	0	0
35	DF	(Germany) GER	Max Finkgräfe	0	0	0	0	0	0
-	FW	(Bosnia and Herzegovina) BIH	Imad Rondić	0	0	0	0	0	0

Last updated: 3 May 2026
Source: FotMob
