= Ísak Jóhannesson =

Icelandic footballer (born 2003)

Personal information
- Full name: Ísak Bergmann Jóhannesson
- Date of birth: 23 March 2003 (age 23)
- Place of birth: Sutton Coldfield, England
- Height: 1.84 m (6 ft 0 in)
- Position: Midfielder

Team information
- Current team: 1. FC Köln
- Number: 18

Youth career
- –2018: ÍA

Senior career*
Years	Team	Apps	(Gls)
2018	ÍA	1	(0)
2019–2021	IFK Norrköping	44	(5)
2021–2024	Copenhagen	40	(5)
2023–2024	→ Fortuna Düsseldorf (loan)	29	(4)
2024–2025	Fortuna Düsseldorf	32	(11)
2025–	1. FC Köln	39	(2)

International career^{‡}
2018	Iceland U16	7	(2)
2018–2019	Iceland U17	9	(8)
2019	Iceland U19	5	(1)
2020–	Iceland U21	6	(0)
2020–	Iceland	50	(6)
- * Club domestic league appearances and goals as of 1 November 2026 ‡ National team caps and goals as of 16 November 2026

Ísak Bergmann Jóhannesson (born 23 March 2003) is a professional footballer who plays as a midfielder for Bundesliga club 1. FC Köln. Born in England, he plays for the Iceland national team.

== Club career ==
=== ÍA ===
Having been born outside of Iceland, while his father Jóhannes Karl Guðjónsson was playing for Aston Villa, Ísak started his career with local family club ÍA in Akranes in Iceland. In 2017 he went on trial with both Ajax and Brighton & Hove Albion. In 2018, he played his first senior game with ÍA, aged 15, in the Icelandic second tier, with his father managing ÍA at the time. Later that year, he agreed a move to IFK Norrköping in Sweden, though the transfer didn't go through until 2019.

=== IFK Norrköping ===
Ísak made his Norrköping debut in the Swedish Cup on 21 August 2019, starting and scoring against IFK Timrå. He made his Allsvenskan debut on 26 September 2019, aged 16, coming on as a substitute against AFC Eskilstuna. Before the Swedish 2020 season, he was named the most promising player in the league. He was in the starting line-up for Norrköping for most of the season. In October 2020, he was named one of the 60 most promising players in the world, born in 2003, by British paper The Guardian.

=== Copenhagen ===
On 1 September 2021, Ísak joined Danish Superliga club Copenhagen on a deal until June 2026.

=== Fortuna Düsseldorf ===
On 9 August 2023, Ísak joined 2. Bundesliga club Fortuna Düsseldorf on loan until the end of the 2023–24 season.

After a good season in which Ísak recorded seven goals and nine assists in 37 games for Düsseldorf, the club confirmed on 14 June 2024 that they had triggered his buyout clause - around €2 million according to media reports. According to media reports, Ísak signed a contract until June 2029.

=== 1. FC Köln ===
On 1 June 2025, Ísak signed a five-year contract with 1. FC Köln, recently promoted to Bundesliga.

== International career ==
Ísak has featured for Iceland at under-16, under-17, under-19 and under-21 level. In November 2020 he was called up to the senior squad for UEFA Nations League match against England. He made his debut in that match at the age of 17 years and 240 days, becoming the fifth youngest player to debut for the Icelandic national team. He only became the third youngest player from Akranes to debut for the national team, as Akranes is the home town of four of the six youngest players to debut for the national team.

== Personal life ==
Ísak was born in England on 23 March 2003, to his parents, former international Jóhannes Karl Guðjónsson, known as Joey Guðjónsson who is currently the assistant manager of the Icelandic national football team and his mother Jófríður María Guðlaugsdóttir who works in Akranes's high school, Fjölbrautaskóli Vesturlands. Ísak also has three younger brothers called Jóel Thor (2005), Daniel (2007) and Emil Karl (2010). His maternal cousin is Oliver Stefánsson, who is also contracted to Norrköping. His paternal grandfather was footballer and manager Guðjón Þórðarson. His paternal uncles are Bjarni Guðjónsson, Þórður Guðjónsson and Björn Bergmann Sigurðarson. His maternal aunt is Magnea Guðlaugsdóttir. His father, grandfather, aunt and uncles have all won senior caps for Iceland. In addition, his grandfather managed the senior side. His girlfriend is basketball player Agnes Perla Sigurðardóttir, a former youth international.

== Career statistics ==
=== Club ===
As of match played 1 November 2026

Appearances and goals by club, season and competition
Club	Season	League			National cup (Note: Includes Svenska Cupen, Danish Cup, DFB-Pokal)		Europe		Total	
Club	Season	Division	Apps	Goals	Apps	Goals	Apps	Goals	Apps	Goals
ÍA	2018	1. deild	1	0	0	0	—		1	0
IFK Norrköping	2019	Allsvenskan	1	0	1	1	—		2	1
IFK Norrköping	2020	Allsvenskan	28	3	4	1	—		32	4
IFK Norrköping	2021	Allsvenskan	15	2	1	1	—		16	3
IFK Norrköping	Total		44	5	6	3	—		50	8
Copenhagen	2021–22	Danish Superliga	16	4	1	0	8 (Note: Appearances in UEFA Europa Conference League)	2	25	6
Copenhagen	2022–23	Danish Superliga	22	1	5	0	6 (Note: Appearances in UEFA Champions League)	0	33	1
Copenhagen	2023–24	Danish Superliga	2	0	0	0	1	0	3	0
Copenhagen	Total		40	5	6	0	15	2	61	7
Fortuna Düsseldorf (loan)	2023–24	2. Bundesliga	29	4	5	3	—		34	7
Fortuna Düsseldorf	2024–25	2. Bundesliga	32	11	1	0	—		33	11
Fortuna Düsseldorf	Total		61	15	6	3	—		67	18
1. FC Köln	2025–26	Bundesliga	31	1	2	1	—		33	2
1. FC Köln	2026–27	Bundesliga	8	1	2	3	—		10	4
1. FC Köln	Total		39	2	4	4	—		43	6
Career total			185	27	22	10	15	2	222	39

=== International ===
As of match played 16 November 2026

Appearances and goals by national team and year
National team	Year	Apps	Goals
Iceland	2020	1	0
Iceland	2021	9	1
Iceland	2022	7	2
Iceland	2023	7	0
Iceland	2024	7	1
Iceland	2025	10	2
Iceland	2026	9	0
Total		50	6

Scores and results list Iceland's goal tally first, score column indicates score after each Ísak goal.

List of international goals scored by Ísak Jóhannesson
No.	Date	Venue	Opponent	Score	Result	Competition
1	8 October 2021	Laugardalsvöllur, Reykjavík, Iceland	Armenia	1–1	1–1	2022 FIFA World Cup qualification
2	22 September 2022	Motion invest Arena, Mödling, Austria	Venezuela	1–0	1–0	Friendly
3	19 November 2022	Daugava Stadium, Riga, Latvia	Latvia	1–0	1–1 (8–7 p)	2022 Baltic Cup
4	16 November 2024	Gradski stadion, Nikšić, Montenegro	Montenegro	2–0	2–0	2024–25 UEFA Nations League B
5	5 September 2025	Laugardalsvöllur, Reykjavík, Iceland	Azerbaijan	2–0	5–0	2026 FIFA World Cup qualification
6	5 September 2025	Laugardalsvöllur, Reykjavík, Iceland	Azerbaijan	3–0	5–0	2026 FIFA World Cup qualification

== Honours ==
Copenhagen

- Danish Superliga: 2021–222022–23
- Danish Cup: 2022–23

Iceland

- Baltic Cup: 2022
