= Alessio Castro-Montes =

Belgian footballer

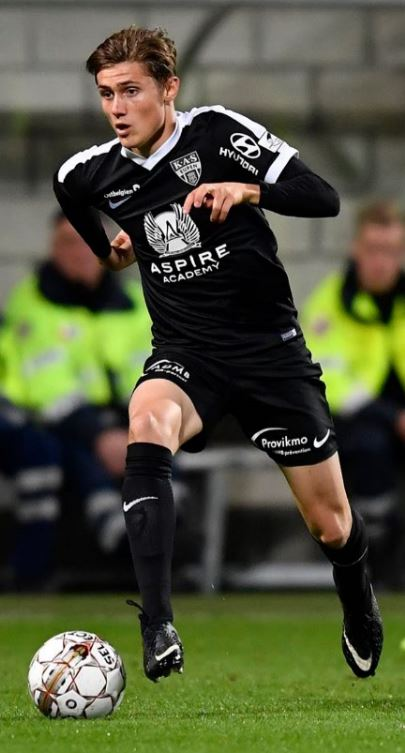
- Castro-Montes playing for Eupen

Personal information
- Full name: Alessio Daniel Castro-Montes
- Date of birth: 17 May 1997 (age 29)
- Place of birth: Tongeren, Belgium
- Height: 1.74 m (5 ft 8 1/2 in)
- Position: Midfielder

Team information
- Current team: 1. FC Köln
- Number: 17

Youth career
- Gelmen VV
- Standard Liège
- Anderlecht
- Sint-Truidense

Senior career*
| Years | Team | Apps | (Gls) |
| 2015–2017 | Sint-Truidense | 1 | (0) |
| 2017–2019 | Eupen | 36 | (2) |
| 2019–2023 | Gent | 125 | (14) |
| 2023–2025 | Union SG | 61 | (6) |
| 2025– | 1. FC Köln | 20 | (1) |
- * Club domestic league appearances and goals as of 1 November 2026

Alessio Daniel Castro-Montes (born 17 May 1997) is a Belgian professional footballer who plays as a midfielder for German Bundesliga club 1. FC Köln.

== Career ==
He started his football career at Gelmen VV under the coaching of his father, where also his three-year older brother played. He was soon noticed by a scout from Standard Liège and shortly after moved to the club where he played for seven years. He later moved to RSC Anderlecht.

On 17 June 2019, Eupen announced that they had sold Castro-Montes to KAA Gent.

On 1 September 2023, Castro-Montes signed a three-year contract with Union SG.

On 1 September 2025, Castro-Montes moved to 1. FC Köln in Germany on a three-season deal.

== Personal life ==
Castro-Montes was born in Belgium to a Spanish father and a Belgian mother.

== Career statistics ==
As of match played 1 November 2026

Appearances and goals by club, season and competition
| Club | Season | League | | | National cup (Note: Includes Belgian Cup) | | Europe | | Other | | Total | |
| Club | Season | Division | Apps | Goals | Apps | Goals | Apps | Goals | Apps | Goals | Apps | Goals |
|---|---|---|---|---|---|---|---|---|---|---|---|---|
| Sint-Truiden | 2015–16 | Belgian Pro League | 1 | 0 | 0 | 0 | – | | – | | 1 | 0 |
| Eupen | 2017–18 | Belgian Pro League | 14 | 0 | 1 | 0 | – | | – | | 15 | 0 |
| Eupen | 2018–19 | Belgian Pro League | 22 | 2 | 2 | 0 | – | | – | | 24 | 2 |
| Eupen | Total | | 36 | 2 | 3 | 0 | – | | – | | 39 | 2 |
| Gent | 2019–20 | Belgian Pro League | 21 | 2 | 2 | 0 | 8 (Note: Appearances in UEFA Europa League) | 0 | – | | 31 | 2 |
| Gent | 2020–21 | Belgian Pro League | 37 | 7 | 2 | 0 | 9 (Note: Three appearances in UEFA Champions League, six appearances in UEFA Europa League) | 0 | – | | 48 | 7 |
| Gent | 2021–22 | Belgian Pro League | 35 | 4 | 5 | 1 | 13 (Note: Appearances in UEFA Conference League) | 0 | – | | 53 | 5 |
| Gent | 2022–23 | Belgian Pro League | 31 | 1 | 3 | 0 | 11 (Note: Two appearances in UEFA Europa League, nine appearances in UEFA Conference League) | 0 | 1 (Note: Appearance in Belgian Super Cup) | 0 | 46 | 1 |
| Gent | 2023–24 | Belgian Pro League | 1 | 0 | 0 | 0 | 3 | 0 | – | | 4 | 0 |
| Gent | Total | | 125 | 14 | 12 | 1 | 44 | 0 | 1 | 0 | 182 | 15 |
| Union SG | 2023–24 | Belgian Pro League | 33 | 4 | 4 | 0 | 10 (Note: Six appearances in UEFA Europa League, four appearances in UEFA Conference League) | 0 | – | | 47 | 4 |
| Union SG | 2024–25 | Belgian Pro League | 23 | 2 | 1 | 0 | 4 (Note: Two appearances in UEFA Champions League, two appearances in UEFA Europa League) | 0 | 1 | 0 | 29 | 2 |
| Union SG | 2025–26 | Belgian Pro League | 5 | 0 | 0 | 0 | 0 | 0 | 1 | 0 | 6 | 0 |
| Union SG | Total | | 61 | 6 | 5 | 0 | 14 | 0 | 2 | 0 | 82 | 6 |
| 1. FC Köln | 2025–26 | Bundesliga | 14 | 1 | 0 | 0 | — | | — | | 14 | 1 |
| 1. FC Köln | 2026–27 | Bundesliga | 6 | 0 | 2 | 0 | — | | — | | 8 | 0 |
| 1. FC Köln | Total | | 20 | 1 | 2 | 0 | — | | — | | 22 | 1 |
| Career total | | | 243 | 23 | 22 | 1 | 58 | 0 | 3 | 0 | 324 | 24 |

== Honours ==
Gent

- Belgian Cup: 2021–22

Union SG

- Belgian Pro League: 2024–25
- Belgian Cup: 2023–24
- Belgian Super Cup: 2024
