= Said El Mala =

German footballer (born 2006)

Personal information
- Date of birth: 26 August 2006 (age 20)
- Place of birth: Krefeld, Germany
- Height: 1.87 m (6 ft 2 in)
- Position: Winger

Team information
- Current team: 1. FC Köln
- Number: 10

Youth career
- 2012–2016: Linner SV
- 2016–2017: KFC Uerdingen 05
- 2017–2021: Borussia Mönchengladbach
- 2021–2023: TSV Meerbusch
- 2023–2024: Viktoria Köln

Senior career*
Years	Team	Apps	(Gls)
2024	Viktoria Köln	10	(1)
2024–	1. FC Köln	41	(15)
2024–2025	→ Viktoria Köln (loan)	32	(13)

International career^{‡}
2024	Germany U18	1	(0)
2024–2025	Germany U19	15	(7)
2025–	Germany U21	7	(1)
2026–	Germany	3	(0)
- * Club domestic league appearances and goals as of 1 November 2026 ‡ National team caps and goals as of 21:52, 13 November 2026 (UTC)

Said El Mala (German pronunciation: [zaˈiːt ɛlˈmaːla]; born 26 August 2006) is a German professional footballer who plays as winger for Bundesliga club 1. FC Köln and the Germany national team.

== Early life ==
El Mala was born on 26 August 2006 in Krefeld, Germany. His mother, Sabrina, is German, and his father, Mohammed, is Lebanese. Both work at Düsseldorf-based consumer goods company Henkel. His father played as a centre-back for Ansar in the Lebanese Premier League during the 1990s, before moving to Germany, where he played for Linner SV in Krefeld. El Mala's older brother, Malek, is also a professional footballer.

== Club career ==
=== Youth ===
El Mala began playing football with Linner SV, where his father had also played, joining the club on 30 March 2012 and playing until the under-11 level. He then spent a brief period with KFC Uerdingen 05 during the U11 season, before joining the youth academy of Borussia Mönchengladbach, where he remained until his release at age 14. El Mala then joined TSV Meerbusch, before moving to Viktoria Köln in 2023.

=== Viktoria Köln ===
On 19 February 2024, El Mala signed his first professional contract with Viktoria Köln. He made his senior debut two days later in a 3. Liga match against 1. FC Saarbrücken. On 26 June 2024, he signed a contract with 1. FC Köln; however, due to the club's transfer ban, he remained on loan at Viktoria Köln for the 2024–25 season. After scoring 13 goals in 32 games, he was named the 2024–25 3. Liga Newcomer of the Season.

=== 1. FC Köln ===
On 19 July 2025, El Mala's contract was extended until 2030. He scored his first Bundesliga goal on 31 August 2025, in a 4–1 home win against SC Freiburg. On 21 March 2026, he scored his tenth league goal of the season in a 3–3 draw against Borussia Mönchengladbach, becoming only the fourth teenager in Köln's history, after Lukas Podolski, Pierre Littbarski, and Dieter Müller, to reach ten league goals for the club. He was the second youngest of the four. He also became the sixth-youngest player in Bundesliga history to reach ten goals in a season.

On 12 April, El Mala scored his first penalty in a 3–1 win over Werder Bremen, bringing his league tally to 11 goals. He scored again on the final matchday in a 5–1 loss to Bayern Munich, after a solo run of more than 60 metres. He finished the 2025–26 season with 13 goals and five assists, making an appearance in all 34 matchdays. Later that year, on 20 August, he extended his contract until 2031 and switched to the number 10 shirt, last worn by Lukas Podolski at the club.

== International career ==
=== Youth ===
El Mala received his first call-up to the Germany national under-18 team in May 2024, making his debut in a friendly against Denmark on 22 May 2024. In May 2025, he was called up to the Germany under-19 squad for the 2025 UEFA European Under-19 Championship, scoring a late winner against Norway to help Germany reach the semi-finals.

On 5 September 2025, El Mala made his debut for the under-21 side, and went on to appear in the 2027 UEFA European Under-21 Championship qualification. On 31 March 2026, he scored his maiden goal for the under-21 side in a 2–0 away win against Greece in the qualifiers, dedicating his goal to his late grandmother who had passed away a few days prior.

=== Senior ===
El Mala received his first senior call-up from Germany coach Julian Nagelsmann for the final two matches of the 2026 World Cup qualifying campaign against Luxembourg and Slovakia. He remained an unused substitute against Luxembourg and was subsequently released to the under-21 team. Despite scoring 13 goals and providing five assists during the 2025–26 season, he was not selected for Germany's 2026 FIFA World Cup squad.

In September 2026, El Mala was one of the players who were called up for the Germany national team by new head coach Jürgen Klopp for the 2026–27 UEFA Nations League matches against Netherlands, Greece, and Serbia, making his debut against Serbia in a 2–0 victory on 1 October.

== Style of play ==
El Mala is a versatile winger known for his pace, dribbling, and direct attacking style. He often cuts inside from wide positions to create or finish scoring opportunities. He has also been noted for his acceleration, one-on-one ability, and finishing, as well as his long-range shooting and ability to score individual goals.

== Career statistics ==
=== Club ===
As of match played 1 November 2026

Appearances and goals by club, season and competition
Club	Season	League			DFB-Pokal		Other		Total	
Club	Season	Division	Apps	Goals	Apps	Goals	Apps	Goals	Apps	Goals
Viktoria Köln	2023–24	3. Liga	10	1	—		1 (Note: Appearance(s) in Middle Rhine Cup)	0	11	1
1. FC Köln	2024–25	2. Bundesliga	—		—		—		0	0
1. FC Köln	2025–26	Bundesliga	34	13	2	0	—		36	13
1. FC Köln	2026–27	Bundesliga	7	2	2	2	—		9	4
1. FC Köln	Total		41	15	4	2	0	0	45	17
Viktoria Köln (loan)	2024–25	3. Liga	32	13	—		2	0	34	13
Career total			83	29	4	2	3	0	90	31

=== International ===
As of match played 13 November 2026

Appearances and goals by national team and year
National team	Year	Apps	Goals
Germany	2026	3	0
Total		3	0

== Honours ==
Viktoria Köln

- Middle Rhine Cup: 2025

Individual

- Fritz Walter Medal U19 Silver: 2025
- 3. Liga Newcomer of the Season: 2024–25
- UEFA European Under-19 Championship top scorer: 2025
- UEFA European Under-19 Championship Team of the Tournament: 2025
