= Tom Krauß =

German footballer (born 2001)

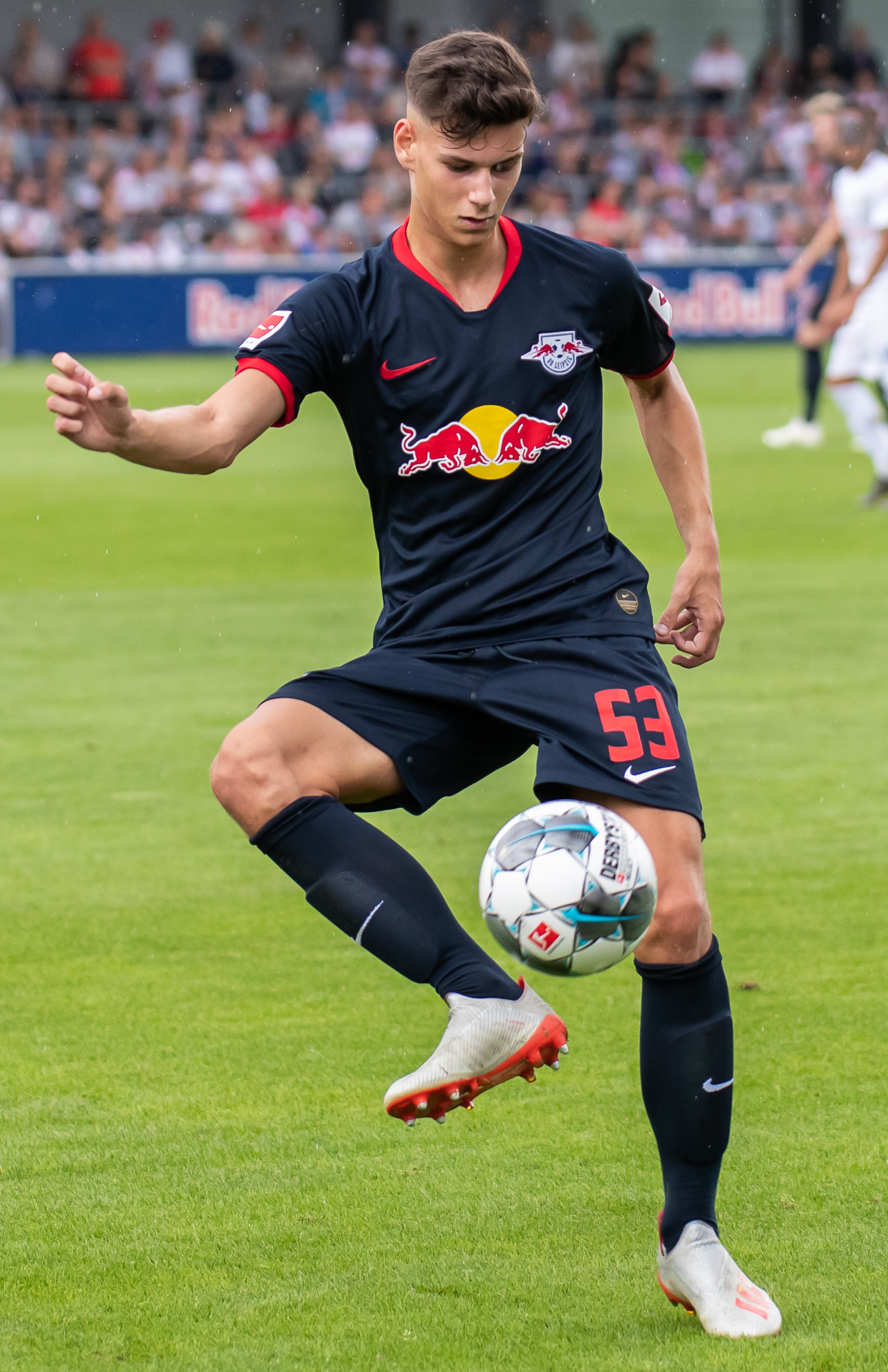
- Krauß with RB Leipzig in 2019

Personal information
- Date of birth: 22 June 2001 (age 25)
- Place of birth: Leipzig, Germany
- Height: 1.82 m (6 ft 0 in)
- Position: Defensive midfielder

Team information
- Current team: 1. FC Köln
- Number: 5

Youth career
- –2011: Sachsen Leipzig
- 2011–2020: RB Leipzig

Senior career*
Years	Team	Apps	(Gls)
2020–2023	RB Leipzig	1	(0)
2020–2022	→ 1. FC Nürnberg (loan)	63	(5)
2022–2023	→ Schalke 04 (loan)	32	(2)
2023–2026	Mainz 05	31	(1)
2024–2025	→ Luton Town (loan)	23	(2)
2025	→ VfL Bochum (loan)	14	(0)
2025–2026	→ 1. FC Köln (loan)	26	(0)
2026–	1. FC Köln	8	(0)

International career^{‡}
2015	Germany U15	2	(0)
2016	Germany U16	7	(1)
2017	Germany U17	10	(0)
2018	Germany U18	4	(0)
2019	Germany U19	5	(1)
2020	Germany U20	1	(0)
2021–2023	Germany U21	14	(3)
- * Club domestic league appearances and goals as of 1 November 2026 ‡ National team caps and goals as of 19:14, 28 June 2023 (UTC)

Tom Krauß (born 22 June 2001) is a German professional footballer who plays as a defensive midfielder for Bundesliga club 1. FC Köln.

== Club career ==
In June 2019, Krauß signed his first professional contract with RB Leipzig until June 30, 2021, which was extended a year later to June 2025. On 27 June 2020, he made his Bundesliga debut for RB Leipzig under coach Julian Nagelsmann, coming on as a substitute in the 87th minute, in a 2–1 away win against Augsburg on the last matchday of the 2019–20 season, to become the first native of Leipzig to make his professional debut with the club. He later joined 1. FC Nürnberg on a two-year loan basis, to follow newly appointed coach Robert Klauß who had managed RB Leipzig youth teams.

On 10 June 2022, Schalke 04 announced the signing of Krauß on loan from RB Leipzig with an obligation to buy for €3 million if Schalke avoid relegation in the 2022–23 season. On 2 October, he scored his first Bundesliga goal for Schalke 04 in a 3–2 home defeat against Augsburg.

On 14 July 2023, he joined Mainz 05 on a long-term contract.

On 22 August 2024, Krauß joined EFL Championship club Luton Town on a season-long loan deal. On 29 January 2025, he was recalled from the Luton Town loan and was loaned to VfL Bochum in Bundesliga for the remainder of the 2024–25 season. On 5 July 2025, Krauß was loaned to 1. FC Köln for the 2025–26 season.

On 28 May 2026, Krauß signed permanently for 1. FC Köln after reaching the criteria set to activate the obligation to buy in his loan deal.

== International career ==
Krauß has been playing for DFB junior teams since 2015. He was the captain of the Germany U19 and was most recently nominated for the Germany U21 team.

== Career statistics ==
As of match played 1 November 2026

Appearances and goals by club, season and competition
Club	Season	League			National cup (Note: Includes DFB-Pokal, FA Cup)		League cup (Note: Includes EFL Cup)		Other		Total	
Club	Season	Division	Apps	Goals	Apps	Goals	Apps	Goals	Apps	Goals	Apps	Goals
RB Leipzig	2019–20	Bundesliga	1	0	0	0	—		0	0	1	0
RB Leipzig	2020–21	Bundesliga	0	0	0	0	—		0	0	0	0
RB Leipzig	2021–22	Bundesliga	0	0	0	0	—		0	0	0	0
RB Leipzig	2022–23	Bundesliga	0	0	0	0	—		0	0	0	0
RB Leipzig	Total		1	0	0	0	—		0	0	1	0
1. FC Nürnberg (loan)	2020–21	2. Bundesliga	31	2	1	0	—		—		32	2
1. FC Nürnberg (loan)	2021–22	2. Bundesliga	32	3	2	0	—		—		34	3
1. FC Nürnberg (loan)	Total		63	5	3	0	—		—		66	5
Schalke 04 (loan)	2022–23	Bundesliga	32	2	1	0	—		—		33	2
Mainz 05	2023–24	Bundesliga	29	1	2	0	—		—		31	1
Mainz 05	2024–25	Bundesliga	0	0	0	0	—		—		0	0
Mainz 05	2025–26	Bundesliga	0	0	0	0	—		0	0	0	0
Mainz 05	Total		29	1	2	0	—		0	0	31	1
Luton Town (loan)	2024–25	EFL Championship	23	2	0	0	0	0	—		23	2
VfL Bochum (loan)	2024–25	Bundesliga	14	0	—		—		—		14	0
1. FC Köln (loan)	2025–26	Bundesliga	26	0	1	0	—		—		27	0
1. FC Köln	2026–27	Bundesliga	8	0	2	0	—		—		10	0
Career total			196	10	9	0	0	0	0	0	205	10

== Honours ==
Individual

- Bundesliga Rookie of the Month: September 2022, February 2023
