= Malek El Mala =

German footballer (born 2005)

Personal information
- Date of birth: 2 April 2005 (age 21)
- Place of birth: Krefeld, Germany
- Height: 1.94 m (6 ft 4 in)
- Position: Striker

Team information
- Current team: 1. FC Köln
- Number: 19

Youth career
- –2016: Linner SV
- 2016–2021: Borussia Mönchengladbach
- 2021–2023: TSV Meerbusch
- 2023–2024: Viktoria Köln

Senior career*
Years	Team	Apps	(Gls)
2024	Viktoria Köln	1	(0)
2024–	1. FC Köln	1	(1)
2024–2025	→ Viktoria Köln (loan)	19	(3)
2025–	→ 1. FC Köln II (res.)	24	(10)

International career^{‡}
2024	Germany U19	1	(0)
- * Club domestic league appearances and goals as of 1 November 2026 ‡ National team caps and goals as of 18:55, 17 June 2025 (UTC)

Malek El Mala (born 2 April 2005) is a German professional footballer who plays as striker for Bundesliga club 1. FC Köln.

== Early life ==
El Mala was born in Krefeld, Germany. His mother, Sabrina, is German, and his father, Mohammed, is Lebanese. Both work at Düsseldorf-based consumer goods company Henkel. His father played as a centre-back for Ansar in the Lebanese Premier League during the 1990s, before moving to Germany, where he played for Linner SV in Krefeld. El Mala's younger brother, Said, is also a professional footballer.

== Club career ==
=== Early career ===
El Mala began playing football with Linner SV, where his father had also played, remaining at the club until the under-11 level. He later joined the youth academy of Borussia Mönchengladbach, where he remained until his release at age 14. El Mala then joined TSV Meerbusch, before moving to Viktoria Köln in 2023.

On 19 February 2024, he signed his first professional contract with Viktoria Köln. He debuted with them in a 5–3 loss in a 3. Liga match against Preußen Münster on 27 April 2024.

=== 1. FC Köln ===
On 26 June 2024, El Mala signed a contract with 1. FC Köln; however, due to the club's transfer ban, he remained on loan at Viktoria Köln for the 2024–25 season. On 19 July 2025, his contract was extended until 2030.

El Mala played for Köln's reserve team in the Regionalliga West during the 2025–26 season; after playing 11 matches, in which he scored five goals, El Mala tore his muscle in November 2025 and was sidelined for several months, returning to action on 10 May 2026. After returning from injury, El Mala played two more games, finishing the season with 13 appearances.

El Mala received his first call-up to Köln's first team on 24 October 2026, for a Bundesliga game against Schalke 04. He made his debut on 1 November, starting the match and scoring the equaliser in a 1–1 draw against Union Berlin.

== International career ==
Born in Germany, El Mala is of Lebanese descent through his father. In May 2024, he was called up to the Germany national under-19 team for a friendly against Denmark, and made his appearance as a half-time substitute in a 5–1 defeat.

== Style of play ==
Originally a centre-back, El Mala converted to a striker with Viktoria Köln's under-19s in early 2024.

== Career statistics ==
As of match played 1 November 2026

Appearances and goals by club, season and competition
Club	Season	League			DFB-Pokal		Other		Total	
Club	Season	Division	Apps	Goals	Apps	Goals	Apps	Goals	Apps	Goals
Viktoria Köln	2023–24	3. Liga	1	0	—		1 (Note: Appearance(s) in Middle Rhine Cup)	0	2	0
1. FC Köln	2024–25	2. Bundesliga	—		—		—		0	0
1. FC Köln	2025–26	Bundesliga	—		—		—		0	0
1. FC Köln	2026–27	Bundesliga	1	1	0	0	—		1	1
1. FC Köln	Total		1	1	0	0	0	0	1	1
Viktoria Köln (loan)	2024–25	3. Liga	19	3	—		3	2	22	5
1. FC Köln II (res.)	2025–26	Regionalliga West	13	5	—		—		13	5
1. FC Köln II (res.)	2026–27	Regionalliga West	11	5	—		—		11	5
1. FC Köln II (res.)	Total		24	10	0	0	0	0	24	10
Career total			45	14	0	0	4	2	49	16

== Honours ==
Viktoria Köln

- Middle Rhine Cup: 2025
