= Mikey Moore =

English footballer (born 2007)

- Moore in 2024

Personal information
- Full name: Mikey Steven Danny Moore
- Date of birth: 11 August 2007 (age 19)
- Place of birth: Lambeth, England
- Height: 5 ft 11 in (1.80 m)
- Position: Winger

Team information
- Current team: 1. FC Köln; (on loan from Tottenham Hotspur)
- Number: 47

Youth career
- 2014–2024: Tottenham Hotspur

Senior career*
Years	Team	Apps	(Gls)
2024–	Tottenham Hotspur	14	(0)
2025–2026	→ Rangers (loan)	33	(7)
2026–	→ 1. FC Köln (loan)	9	(1)

International career^{‡}
2019–2022	England U15	10	(8)
2022–2023	England U16	15	(9)
2023–2024	England U17	12	(10)
2024–2026	England U19	14	(7)
2026	England U20	3	(2)
2026–	England U21	1	(0)
- * Club domestic league appearances and goals as of 22:38, 20 November 2026 (UTC) ‡ National team caps and goals as of 22:14,13 November 2026 (UTC)

Mikey Steven Danny Moore (born 11 August 2007) is an English professional footballer who plays as a winger for Bundesliga club 1. FC Köln, on loan from Premier League club Tottenham Hotspur.

== Club career ==
=== Tottenham Hotspur ===
Moore was born in the London Borough of Lambeth, but attended Strood Academy in Kent, after attending Welling School Moore moved to Tottenham Hotspur to finish his development as a U9. For the 2022–23 season, he was part of the trophy-winning Tottenham Hotspur U17s, the U18s, played for the U19s in the UEFA Youth League, and was one of their youngest ever players to debut U21s at the age of 15. He helped Tottenham win the U17 and U18 Premier League cups that season. On 17 June 2023, Moore signed a schoolboy contract with Tottenham Hotspur. He was named by English newspaper The Guardian as one of the best first year scholars in the Premier League in October 2023.

On 14 May 2024, Moore made his first team debut in a 2–0 home defeat against Manchester City, becoming the youngest Tottenham player to play in the Premier League at the age of 16 years and 277 days, surpassing Dane Scarlett's record.

Moore signed a three-year professional contract with Tottenham on 12 August 2024, the day after his 17th birthday.

On 26 September 2024, Moore made his European debut in a 3–0 home win over Qarabağ FK in the UEFA Europa League and later made his first senior start in a 2–1 away victory against Ferencváros a few days later on 3 October 2024 and remained on the pitch the entire match. He made his second start for the club in the same competition, earning praise from teammate James Maddison, who compared Moore to Neymar.

On 27 October 2024, Moore made his first Premier League start in a 1–0 away loss to Crystal Palace, playing 62 minutes before being substituted for Timo Werner. At 17 years, 77 days, Moore became the youngest player to start in a Premier League match for Tottenham since Stephen Carr started against Ipswich Town in September 1993. Three days later on 30 October 2024, Moore made his EFL Cup debut in a 2–1 home win against Manchester City, being brought on for Brennan Johnson in the 68th minute.

On 30 January 2025, Moore won possession back 32 metres from goal, beat two defenders, and slotted the football into the bottom corner of the opposition's net, scoring his first senior goal in dramatic fashion with the last kick of the match in a 3–0 win over IF Elfsborg in the UEFA Europa League. At 17 years and 172 days old, Moore became England's youngest-ever scorer in a major European competition, breaking Spurs legend Jimmy Greaves' record (17 years 245 days) set in 1957. Moore remained on the bench as an unused substitute during the 2025 UEFA Europa League final as Tottenham beat Manchester United to win their first trophy since 2008.

==== Loan to Rangers ====
On 1 August 2025, Moore joined Scottish Premiership side Rangers on a season-long loan for the 2025–26 season. While at Rangers, Moore signed a new contract with Tottenham Hotspur on his 18th birthday, 11 August 2025. He made his debut for the Glasgow club against Alloa Athletic in the Premier Sports Cup (League Cup), starting the match and assisting the first goal in a 4–2 victory. Shortly after, he made his Champions League debut, coming off of the bench in a 3–1 defeat to Club Brugge. Moore scored his first goal for Rangers on 9 November 2025, the second goal in a 3–0 Scottish Premiership victory away to Dundee. In his first league Old Firm, he scored the third goal in a 3–1 victory for Rangers. Moore ended the season winning both the Rangers Men's Young Player of the Year and the PFA Scotland Young Player of the Year.

==== Loan to FC Köln ====
On 31 August 2026, Moore joined Bundesliga side 1. FC Köln on loan until the end of the 2026–27 season. On 4 September against VfB Stuttgart, the club became the first Bundesliga side ever to have three Englishmen on the pitch at the same time as Jahmai Simpson-Pusey and Reigan Heskey played alongside Moore. On 20 November 2026, Moore scored his debut goal for the club, against Bayern Munich, with the game finishing as a 1–1 draw.

== International career ==
Moore is a youth international for England. He has played up to the England U21s. He qualifies for the Republic of Ireland through his mother born in Waterford. He also qualifies to represent Wales through a Welsh grandparent.

On 20 May 2024, Moore was included in the England squad for the 2024 UEFA European Under-17 Championship. He scored a brace in the opening game of the tournament, a 4–0 win over France in Larnaca. Moore also scored goals in their next group fixtures against Portugal and Spain. He then started in the quarter-final elimination against Italy. On 9 November 2023, Moore scored his first England U17 hat-trick in a 5–1 victory away to Croatia U17s.

On 7 September 2024, Moore made his England U19 debut during a 1–1 draw away to Croatia U19. He was included in the squad for the 2025 UEFA European Under-19 Championship and scored his only goal of the tournament during their opening group stage draw with Norway. On 11 October 2025, Moore scored his first hat-trick for England U19s, in a friendly match against Belgium U19s which England won 4–1.

== Career statistics ==
As of match played 20 November 2026

Appearances and goals by club, season and competition
Club	Season	League			National cup (Note: Includes FA Cup, Scottish Cup)		League Cup (Note: Includes EFL Cup, Scottish League Cup)		Europe		Total	
Club	Season	Division	Apps	Goals	Apps	Goals	Apps	Goals	Apps	Goals	Apps	Goals
Tottenham Hotspur	2023–24	Premier League	2	0	0	0	0	0	—		2	0
Tottenham Hotspur	2024–25	Premier League	10	0	2	0	2	0	5 (Note: Appearances in UEFA Europa League)	1	19	1
Tottenham Hotspur	2026–27	Premier League	2	0	—		1	1	—		3	1
Tottenham Hotspur	Total		14	0	2	0	3	1	5	1	24	2
Rangers (loan)	2025–26	Scottish Premiership	33	7	3	0	3	0	8 (Note: One appearance in UEFA Champions League, seven appearances in UEFA Europa League)	0	47	7
1. FC Köln (loan)	2026–27	Bundesliga	9	1	1	0	—		—		10	1
Career total			56	8	6	0	6	1	13	1	81	10

== Honours ==
Tottenham Hotspur

- UEFA Europa League: 2024–25

Individual

- Rangers Men's Young Player of the Year: 2025–26
- PFA Scotland Young Player of the Year: 2025–26
