= Jahmai Simpson-Pusey =

English footballer (born 2005)

Personal information
- Full name: Jahmai Simpson-Pusey
- Date of birth: 4 November 2005 (age 21)
- Place of birth: Huddersfield, England
- Height: 1.87 m (6 ft 2 in)
- Position: Centre-back

Team information
- Current team: 1. FC Köln
- Number: 22

Youth career
- 2013–2024: Manchester City

Senior career*
Years	Team	Apps	(Gls)
2024–2026	Manchester City	2	(0)
2025–2026	→ Celtic (loan)	1	(0)
2026	→ 1. FC Köln (loan)	11	(0)
2026–	1. FC Köln	10	(0)

International career^{‡}
2023	England U18	3	(0)
2026–	England U21	3	(0)
- * Club domestic league appearances and goals as of 20:47, 20 November 2026 (UTC) ‡ National team caps and goals as of 20:47, 16 November 2026 (UTC)

Jahmai Simpson-Pusey (born 4 November 2005) is an English professional footballer who plays as a centre-back for Bundesliga club 1. FC Köln.

== Early life ==
Simpson-Pusey was born in Huddersfield in West Yorkshire. He had trials with multiple Premier League clubs before opting to join the youth academy at Manchester City at the age of eight years-old.

== Club career ==
Simpson-Pusey signed a professional contract with Manchester City in July 2023. A central defender, he captained the City U18 side in the FA Youth Cup and UEFA Youth League in 2024, winning the FA Youth Cup. That summer, he was selected to travel with the first-team on their pre-season tour and featured in matches against AC Milan and Celtic.

Simpson-Pusey made his professional debut on 30 October 2024, appearing as a second-half substitute for Manchester City in their 2–1 away loss in the EFL Cup against Tottenham Hotspur. Six days later, he was given his first start and made his UEFA Champions League debut in a 4–1 away loss against Sporting CP. On 9 November, he made his first Premier League appearance, starting in a 2–1 away defeat to Brighton & Hove Albion. Simpson-Pusey was named the Premier League 2 player of the season for the 2024–25 season.

On 5 August 2025, Simpson-Pusey joined Scottish Premiership club Celtic on a season-long loan deal. After failing to make a single first-team appearance for four months, and not even making the bench post-August, he made his long-awaited debut on 9 November when he started the Bhoys' 4–0 league victory against Kilmarnock.

Having made one appearance for Celtic, Simpson-Pusey's loan deal was ended during the January transfer window, and he was then loaned out to Bundesliga club 1. FC Köln until the end of the season. On 12 June 2026, Simpson-Pusey joined Köln on a permanent contract until 2030. On 4 September against VfB Stuttgart, the club became the first Bundesliga side ever to have three Englishmen on the pitch at the same time as Simpson-Pusey played alongside Mikey Moore and Reigan Heskey.

== International career ==
In March 2023, Simpson-Pusey made two appearances for England under-18 against Croatia and Switzerland.

In October 2026, Simpson-Pusey made his debut for England U21 in their last qualifier against Republic of Ireland.

== Career statistics ==
As of match played 20 November 2026

Appearances and goals by club, season and competition
Club	Season	League			National cup (Note: Includes FA Cup)		League cup (Note: Includes EFL Cup)		Europe		Other		Total	
Club	Season	Division	Apps	Goals	Apps	Goals	Apps	Goals	Apps	Goals	Apps	Goals	Apps	Goals
Manchester City	2024–25	Premier League	2	0	1	0	1	0	2 (Note: Appearances in UEFA Champions League)	0	0	0	6	0
Celtic (loan)	2025–26	Scottish Premiership	1	0	—		0	0	0	0	1 (Note: Appearance in Scottish Challenge Cup)	0	2	0
1. FC Köln (loan)	2025–26	Bundesliga	11	0	—		—		—		—		11	0
1. FC Köln	2026–27	Bundesliga	10	0	2	0	—		—		—		12	0
1. FC Köln	Köln total		21	0	2	0	—		—		—		23	0
Career total			24	0	3	0	1	0	2	0	1	0	31	0
