= Jusuf Gazibegović =

Bosnian footballer (born 2000)

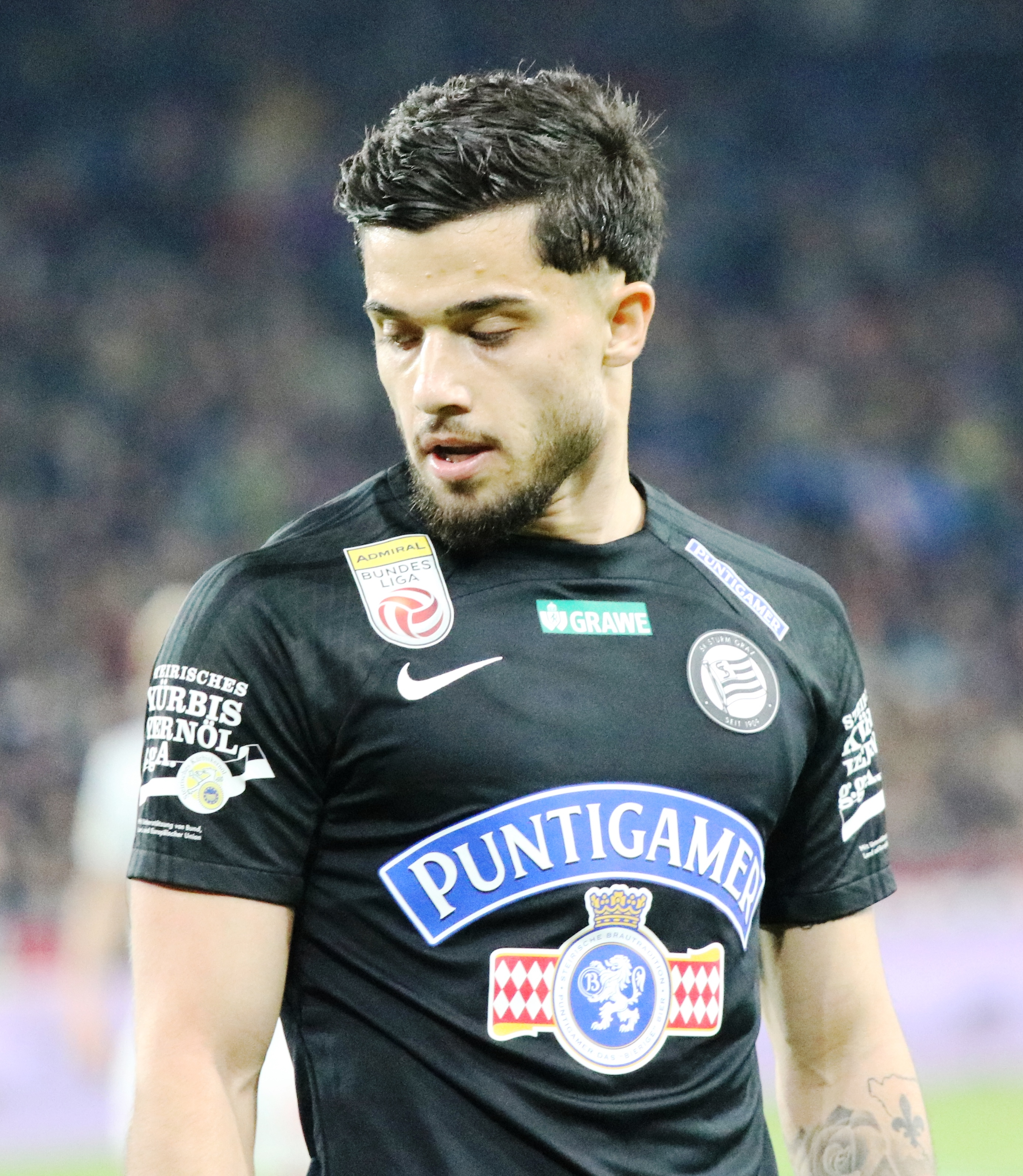
- Gazibegović playing for Sturm Graz in 2024

Personal information
- Date of birth: 11 March 2000 (age 26)
- Place of birth: Salzburg, Austria
- Height: 1.74 m (5 ft 9 in)
- Position: Right-back

Team information
- Current team: Widzew Łódź (on loan from 1. FC Köln)
- Number: 70

Youth career
- 2009–2011: Austria Salzburg
- 2011–2018: Red Bull Salzburg

Senior career*
Years	Team	Apps	(Gls)
2018–2020	Red Bull Salzburg	0	(0)
2018–2020	Liefering	39	(0)
2020–2024	Sturm Graz	126	(5)
2025–	1. FC Köln	12	(0)
2026	→ Sturm Graz (loan)	11	(0)
2026–	→ Widzew Łódź (loan)	7	(0)

International career^{‡}
2016–2017	Bosnia and Herzegovina U17	16	(0)
2017–2018	Bosnia and Herzegovina U19	11	(1)
2018–2021	Bosnia and Herzegovina U21	4	(0)
2021–	Bosnia and Herzegovina	23	(0)
- * Club domestic league appearances and goals as of 7 November 2026 ‡ National team caps and goals as of 9 September 2025

Jusuf Gazibegović (pronounced [jǔsuf ɡazibêːgoʋitɕ]; born 11 March 2000) is a professional footballer who plays as a right-back for Ekstraklasa club Widzew Łódź, on loan from 1. FC Köln. Born in Austria, he plays for the Bosnia and Herzegovina national team.

Gazibegović started his professional career at Red Bull Salzburg, who assigned him to Liefering in 2018. Two years later, he joined Sturm Graz. In 2025, he moved to 1. FC Köln, who loaned him back to Sturm Graz in 2026 and to Widzew Łódź later that year.

A former youth international for Bosnia and Herzegovina, Gazibegović made his senior international debut in 2021, earning over 20 caps since.

== Club career ==
=== Early career ===
Gazibegović started playing football at a local club Austria Salzburg, before joining the youth academy of his hometown team Red Bull Salzburg in 2011. He made his professional debut playing for Red Bull Salzburg's feeder squad, Liefering, against Ried on 3 March 2018 at the age of 17. In April 2019, he suffered a severe knee injury, which was diagnosed as an anterior cruciate ligament tear and was ruled out for at least six months.

=== Sturm Graz ===
In September 2020, Gazibegović moved to Sturm Graz on a three-year deal. He made his official debut for the side on 4 October against Altach. On 9 February 2021, he scored his first professional goal against Ried, which secured the victory for his team.

In December 2022, he extended his contract with Sturm Graz until June 2026.

Gazibegović played his 100th game for the squad on 9 April 2023 against LASK.

He won his first trophy with the club on 30 April, by beating Rapid Wien in the Austrian Cup final.

On 19 September 2024, he debuted in the UEFA Champions League away at Brest.

=== 1. FC Köln ===
In January 2025, Gazibegović was transferred to German outfit 1. FC Köln for an undisclosed fee. He made his competitive debut for the squad against Hamburger SV on 18 January.

Gazibegović was an important piece in 1. FC Köln's capture of the 2. Bundesliga title, his first trophy with the club, which was secured on 18 May 2025 and earned them promotion to the Bundesliga just one season after being relegated.

In January 2026, he was loaned to his former team Sturm Graz until the end of the season.

In July, he was sent on a season-long loan to Polish side Widzew Łódź.

== International career ==
Gazibegović represented Bosnia and Herzegovina at all youth levels. He also served as a captain of the under-19 team under coach Toni Karačić.

In May 2021, he received his first senior call up, for friendly games against Montenegro and Denmark. He debuted against the former on 2 June.

== Personal life ==
Gazibegović is a practising Muslim; together with international teammates Ermedin Demirović, Haris Tabaković, Nihad Mujakić, Haris Hajradinović, Dženis Burnić, Sead Kolašinac, Enver Kulašin, Nail Omerović, Benjamin Tahirović, Osman Hadžikić and Ermin Bičakčić he visited a mosque in Ilidža during the national team's concentration.

== Career statistics ==
=== Club ===
As of match played 7 November 2026

Appearances and goals by club, season and competition
Club	Season	League			National cup (Note: Includes Austrian Cup, DFB-Pokal)		Continental		Total	
Club	Season	Division	Apps	Goals	Apps	Goals	Apps	Goals	Apps	Goals
Liefering	2017–18	2. Liga	8	0	–		–		8	0
Liefering	2018–19	2. Liga	18	0	–		–		18	0
Liefering	2019–20	2. Liga	13	0	–		–		13	0
Liefering	Total		39	0	–		–		39	0
Sturm Graz	2020–21	Austrian Bundesliga	25	1	4	0	–		29	1
Sturm Graz	2021–22	Austrian Bundesliga	27	0	3	0	7 (Note: Appearances in UEFA Europa League)	0	37	0
Sturm Graz	2022–23	Austrian Bundesliga	29	2	6	1	7 (Note: Two appearances in UEFA Champions League; five appearances in UEFA Europa League)	0	42	3
Sturm Graz	2023–24	Austrian Bundesliga	31	2	5	0	11 (Note: Two appearances in UEFA Champions League; six appearances in UEFA Europa League; three appearances in UEFA Conference League)	0	47	2
Sturm Graz	2024–25	Austrian Bundesliga	14	0	3	0	5 (Note: Appearances in UEFA Champions League)	0	22	0
Sturm Graz	Total		126	5	21	1	30	0	177	6
1. FC Köln	2024–25	2. Bundesliga	11	0	1	0	–		12	0
1. FC Köln	2025–26	Bundesliga	1	0	0	0	–		1	0
1. FC Köln	Total		12	0	1	0	–		13	0
Sturm Graz (loan)	2025–26	Austrian Bundesliga	11	0	1	0	0	0	12	0
Widzew Łódź (loan)	2026–27	Ekstraklasa	7	0	0	0	–		7	0
Career total			195	5	23	1	30	0	248	6

=== International ===
As of match played 9 September 2025

Appearances and goals by national team and year
National team	Year	Apps	Goals
Bosnia and Herzegovina
Bosnia and Herzegovina	2021	2	0
Bosnia and Herzegovina	2022	3	0
Bosnia and Herzegovina	2023	9	0
Bosnia and Herzegovina	2024	7	0
Bosnia and Herzegovina	2025	2	0
Total		23	0

== Honours ==
Sturm Graz

- Austrian Bundesliga: 2023–24
- Austrian Cup: 2022–23, 2023–24

1. FC Köln

- 2. Bundesliga: 2024–25
