= Chibuzo Nwoko =

Nigerian footballer (born 2005)

Personal information
- Full name: Chibuzo Udo Nwoko Junior
- Date of birth: 5 December 2005 (age 20)
- Place of birth: England
- Height: 1.83 m (6 ft 0 in)
- Position: Midfielder

Team information
- Current team: Fulham
- Number: 34

Youth career
- Fulham

Senior career*
Years	Team	Apps	(Gls)
2026–	Fulham	0	(0)
2026	→ Forest Green Rovers (loan)	20	(1)

International career^{‡}
2023	England U18	3	(0)
2026–	Nigeria	1	(0)
- * Club domestic league appearances and goals ‡ National team caps and goals as of 6 October 2026

Chibuzo Udo Nwoko Junior (born 5 December 2005) is a professional footballer who plays as a midfielder for Fulham. Born in England, he has represented England internationally at youth level, before switching allegiance to Nigeria for the senior level.

== Early life ==
Nwoko was born on 5 December 2005. Born in England, he is of Nigerian descent through his father.

== Club career ==
As a youth player, Nwoko joined the youth academy of English Premier League side Fulham at under-12 level and was promoted to the club's under-21 team ahead of the 2024–25 season.

Subsequently, he was sent on loan to English outfit Forest Green Rovers in 2026, where he made twenty league appearances and scored one goal. On 10 January 2026, he debuted for the club during a 2–0 away win over Ebbsfleet United in the FA Trophy.

The same year, he was promoted to the Cottagers senior team. On 27 August 2026, he debuted for them during a 3–0 home win over AFC Wimbledon in the EFL Cup.

== International career ==
Nwoko is an England youth international and has represented the country internationally at under-18 level. On 9 June 2023, he debuted for the England national under-18 football team during a 2–2 away draw with the Norway national under-18 football team.

Altogether he made three appearances and scored zero goals while playing for the England national under-18 football team. During September 2026, he was first called up to the Nigeria national football team for 2027 Africa Cup of Nations qualification.

On 6 October 2026, Nwoko made his debut for Nigeria in a friendly against Russia.

== Style of play ==
Nwoko plays as a midfielder and is left-footed. Nigerian news website Afrik-Foot wrote in 2026 "with the capacity to play as a six, eight or 10... [he] can sit in front of the defence, operate as a central midfielder or move higher into an attacking midfield role... his passing range can help... build attacks from deeper areas, while his ability to break up play gives him defensive value".
