= Fynn Schenten =

German footballer (born 2007)

Personal information
- Date of birth: 14 September 2007 (age 19)
- Place of birth: Germany
- Height: 1.89 m (6 ft 2 in)
- Positions: Winger; forward

Team information
- Current team: Roda JC (on loan from 1. FC Köln)
- Number: 10

Youth career
- –2016: SV Wachtberg
- 2016–2025: 1. FC Köln

Senior career*
Years	Team	Apps	(Gls)
2025–	1. FC Köln	7	(0)
2026–	1. FC Köln II	6	(1)
2026–	→ Roda JC (loan)	3	(0)
- * Club domestic league appearances and goals as of 19:44, 11 September 2026 (UTC)

Fynn Schenten (German pronunciation: [fʏn ˈʃɛntən]; born 14 September 2007) is a German professional footballer who plays as a winger or forward for Eerste Divisie club Roda JC, on loan from Bundesliga club 1. FC Köln.

== Career ==
As a youth player, Schenten joined the youth academy of SV Wachtberg. Following his stint there, he joined the youth academy of 1. FC Köln ahead of the 2016–17 season, where he played in the UEFA Youth League and was promoted to the club's senior team in 2025.

On 29 January 2026, Schenten extended his contract with 1. FC Köln to June 2030.

On 28 July 2026, Schenten was loaned by Roda JC in the Dutch second tier.

== Style of play ==
Schenten plays as a winger or forward. Two-footed, he is known for his speed and strength.

== Career statistics ==
As of match played 25 April 2026

Appearances and goals by club, season and competition
Club	Season	League			Cup		Europe		Other		Total	
Club	Season	Division	Apps	Goals	Apps	Goals	Apps	Goals	Apps	Goals	Apps	Goals
1. FC Köln	2025–26	Bundesliga	7	0	—		—		—		7	0
1. FC Köln II	2025–26	Regionalliga West	6	1	—		—		—		6	1
Career total			13	1	0	0	0	0	0	0	13	1
