= Youssoupha Niang =

German footballer (born 2006)

- Niang in 2026

Personal information
- Date of birth: 26 May 2006 (age 20)
- Place of birth: Germany
- Height: 1.85 m (6 ft 1 in)
- Positions: Winger; forward

Team information
- Current team: FC St. Pauli (on loan from 1. FC Köln)
- Number: 7

Youth career
- –2019: Bonner SC
- 2019–2025: 1. FC Köln

Senior career*
Years	Team	Apps	(Gls)
2025–	1. FC Köln	10	(0)
2026	1. FC Köln II (res.)	4	(3)
2026–	→ FC St. Pauli (loan)	7	(0)
- * Club domestic league appearances and goals as of 20:30, 23 October 2026 (UTC)

Youssoupha Niang (born 26 May 2006) is a German professional footballer who plays as a winger or forward for 2. Bundesliga club FC St. Pauli, on loan from 1. FC Köln.

== Early life ==
Niang was born on 26 May 2006. Born in Germany, he is of Senegalese descent through his parents.

== Career ==
As a youth player, Niang joined the youth academy of Bonner SC. Following his stint there, he joined the youth academy of 1. FC Köln ahead of the 2019–20 season and was promoted to the club's senior team in 2025.

== Style of play ==
Niang plays as a winger or forward. Senegalese news website Dsports.sn wrote in 2024 that "his speed, dribbling skills, and ability to use both feet make him an exceptional talent".

== Career statistics ==
As of match played 23 October 2026

Appearances and goals by club, season and competition
Club	Season	League			Cup		Europe		Other		Total	
Club	Season	Division	Apps	Goals	Apps	Goals	Apps	Goals	Apps	Goals	Apps	Goals
1. FC Köln	2025–26	Bundesliga	10	0	—		—		—		10	0
1. FC Köln II	2025–26	Regionalliga West	4	3	—		—		—		4	3
St. Pauli (loan)	2026–27	2. Bundesliga	7	0	0	0	—		—		7	0
Career total			21	3	0	0	0	0	0	0	21	3
