= Reigan Heskey =

English footballer (born 2008)

Personal information
- Full name: Reigan William Stephen Heskey
- Date of birth: 18 January 2008 (age 18)
- Place of birth: Liverpool, England
- Height: 1.84 m (6 ft 0 in)
- Position: Left winger

Team information
- Current team: 1. FC Köln
- Number: 11

Youth career
- 2016–2025: Manchester City

Senior career*
Years	Team	Apps	(Gls)
2025–2026	Manchester City	0	(0)
2026–	1. FC Köln	3	(0)

International career^{‡}
2024–2025	England U17	15	(5)
2025–	England U18	4	(1)
2026–	England U19	7	(2)
- * Club domestic league appearances and goals as of 17:30, 24 October 2026 (UTC) ‡ National team caps and goals as of 14:00, 5 October 2026 (UTC)

Reigan William Stephen Heskey (born 18 January 2008) is an English professional footballer who plays as a left winger for Bundesliga club 1. FC Köln.

== Early life ==
Reigan William Stephen Heskey was born on 18 January 2008. His father, Emile Heskey, was a Wigan Athletic player at the time. He lived for a part of his childhood in Australia when his father played for Newcastle Jets. In 2016, Heskey joined the Manchester City academy at the age of eight years old.

== Club career ==
=== Manchester City ===
In November 2023, Heskey appeared for Manchester City U19 at the age of 15 years old in the UEFA Youth League alongside his brother Jaden Heskey against Young Boys U19, and scored in a 3–0 win.

Heskey was promoted to the Manchester City U21 side also known as the Elite Development Squad (EDS) – for the 2024–25 season at the age of 16 years old and scored a hat-trick in the space of 22 minutes on his debut as a substitute in Premier League 2 against Norwich City U21. He played for the club's Under-21 side in the EFL Trophy that season and scored his first professional goal in that competition against Grimsby Town in October 2024.

On 24 September 2025, both Heskey and his brother Jaden made their senior debuts for Manchester City in a 2–0 away victory over EFL League One side Huddersfield Town in the EFL Cup third round.

=== 1. FC Köln ===
On 17 July 2026, Heskey joined German Bundesliga side 1. FC Köln on a five-year contract, lasting until 30 June 2031. On 4 September against VfB Stuttgart, the club became the first Bundesliga side ever to have three Englishmen on the pitch at the same time as Jahmai Simpson-Pusey and Mikey Moore played alongside Heskey.

== International career ==
An England youth international, Heskey scored for England U17 against Germany U17 in September 2024. He was included in the squad for the 2025 UEFA European Under-17 Championship and featured as a substitute in all of their group games.

Heskey was a member of the England side at the 2025 FIFA U-17 World Cup. He scored in group stage victories over Haiti and Egypt. Heskey scored his fourth and last goal of the tournament during their knockout stage victory against South Korea. He also started their next game as England were eliminated in the round of sixteen by Austria.

On 9 October 2025, Heskey made his U18 debut during a 1–0 win over France at St. George's Park. Three days later he scored his first goal at this age level during a 2–2 draw against the same opponent.

== Personal life ==
Heskey is the son of former footballer Emile Heskey and wife Chantelle. His brother Jaden Heskey is in the Manchester City Academy. He is of Antiguan descent through his father.

== Career statistics ==
As of match played 27 October 2026

Appearances and goals by club, season and competition
Club	Season	League			National cup (Note: Includes FA Cup)		League cup (Note: Includes EFL Cup)		Europe		Other		Total	
Club	Season	Division	Apps	Goals	Apps	Goals	Apps	Goals	Apps	Goals	Apps	Goals	Apps	Goals
Manchester City U21	2024–25	—			—		—		—		1 (Note: Appearance(s) in EFL Trophy)	1	1	1
Manchester City U21	2025–26	—			—		—		—		2	0	2	0
Manchester City U21	Total		—		—		—		—		3	1	3	1
Manchester City	2025–26	Premier League	0	0	0	0	1	0	0	0	—		1	0
1. FC Köln	2026–27	Bundesliga	3	0	1	0	—		—		—		4	0
Career total			3	0	1	0	1	0	0	0	3	1	8	1
