= Julian Pauli =

German footballer (born 2005)

Personal information
- Full name: Julian Andreas Pauli
- Date of birth: 20 July 2005 (age 21)
- Place of birth: London, England
- Height: 1.90 m (6 ft 3 in)
- Position: Centre-back

Team information
- Current team: OB (on loan from 1. FC Köln)
- Number: 4

Youth career
- 2010–2020: Fortuna Düsseldorf
- 2020–2021: Borussia Dortmund
- 2021–2023: 1. FC Köln

Senior career*
Years	Team	Apps	(Gls)
2023–2024	1. FC Köln II	4	(0)
2024–	1. FC Köln	17	(0)
2025–2026	→ Dynamo Dresden (loan)	21	(0)
2026–	→ OB (loan)	0	(0)

International career^{‡}
2020	Germany U16	1	(0)
2024	Germany U20	6	(0)
- * Club domestic league appearances and goals as of 18 May 2026 ‡ National team caps and goals as of 19 November 2024

Julian Andreas Pauli (born 20 July 2005) is a professional footballer who plays as a centre-back for Danish Superliga club OB, on loan from Bundesliga club 1. FC Köln. Born in England, he is a youth international for Germany.

== Club career ==
Pauli was born in London, England and lived there until the age of 5, where he moved with his parents to Düsseldorf. He is a youth product of Fortuna Düsseldorf and Borussia Dortmund, before moving to 1. FC Köln in 2021 to finish his development. He started training with the Köln reserves in the Regionalliga in 2023. On 11 June 2024, he signed a professional contract with Köln until 2027. He made his senior debut with Köln in a 2–1 2. Bundesliga loss to Hamburger SV on 2 August 2024. On 29 August 2025, Pauli signed a new three-year contract with Köln and subsequently joined 2. Bundesliga side Dynamo Dresden on loan. On 2 September 2026, Pauli moved on a new loan to OB in Denmark.

== International career ==
Born in England, Pauli is of German descent and holds dual German-British citizenship. He is a youth international for Germany, having been called up to the Germany U20s in August 2024.

== Honours ==
1.FC Koln

- 2. Bundesliga: 2024–25

Germany U20

- U20 Elite League: 2024–25
