= 1. FC Köln II =

Reserve team of 1. FC Köln

- Full name: 1. Fußball-Club Köln 01/07 e. V.
- Nickname: Die Geißböcke (The Billy Goats)
- Founded: 1948 (club)
- Ground: Franz-Kremer-Stadion
- Capacity: 5,457
- Manager: Manuel Hartmann
- League: Regionalliga West (IV)
- 2025–26: Regionalliga West, 10th of 18
Home colours	Away colours	Third colours

1. Fußball-Club Köln 01/07 e. V. II, commonly known as simply 1. FC Köln II or 2. FC Köln, is a German football team based in Cologne. It is the reserve team of German association football club 1. FC Köln.

The team has qualified for the first round of the DFB-Pokal, the German Cup, seven times and reached the second round three times. The team currently plays in the fourth tier of German Football, the Regionalliga West.

== History ==
Their biggest ever win was in May 2013 when they defeated MSV Duisburg II 9–0. In the 2001–02 season, it won the Oberliga Nordrhein and was promoted to the Regionalliga Nord, but was then relegated back to it in the 2007–08 season. They joined the Regionalliga West in 2008 when the Oberliga Nordrhein became defunct and finished 8th in their first season.

They have played in the DFB-Pokal 10 times. The first ever time was in the 1976–77 season when they were knocked out in the first round by Hamburger SV. The most recent time playing in the cup was in the 2005–06 season when they were knocked out by Hannover 96 in the first round, in a 0–4 home loss.

== Honours ==
- German amateur football championship
  - Winners: 1981
- Oberliga Nordrhein
  - Champions: 1981, 2002
- Verbandsliga Mittelrhein
  - Champions: 1965, 1967, 1977
- Middle Rhine Cup
  - Winners: 1995, 2004, 2005

== Stadium ==
The Franz-Kremer-Stadion is the home of 1. FC Köln II. It was named after legendary chairman Franz Kremer.

== Current squad ==
As of 8 September 2026

Note: Flags indicate national team as defined under FIFA eligibility rules; some limited exceptions apply. Players may hold more than one non-FIFA nationality.

No.	Pos.	Nation	Player
1	GK	GER	Luis Hauer
2	DF	GER	David Fürst
3	DF	GER	Lionel Voufack
4	MF	GER	Luca Dürholtz
6	DF	GER	Niklas Hoffmann
7	FW	GER	Malek El Mala
8	MF	GER	Ilias Elyazidi
9	FW	GER	Jonas Arweiler
11	FW	DEN	Nilas Yacobi
13	DF	GER	Cenny Neumann
14	MF	POR	Gil Neves
15	MF	GER	Faysal Harchaoui
16	MF	GER	Etienne Borie
18	MF	GER	Kian Hekmat
20	FW	GER	David Okpodu

No.	Pos.	Nation	Player
21	DF	GER	Luc Dabrowski
22	DF	GER	Marvin Ajani
23	FW	GER	Luis Labenz
24	GK	GER	Mikolaj Marutzki
27	DF	GER	Jonathan Friemel
29	MF	BUL	Kristiyan Irmiev
30	FW	GER	Maik Afri Akumu
32	DF	GER	Luis Stapelmann
33	MF	CAN	Evan Brown
—	GK	GER	Simeon Castano Bader
—	GK	FRA	Martin James
—	DF	CRO	Gabriel Mioćevič
—	DF	GER	Assad Kotya-Fofana
—	FW	GER	Len Wörsdörfer

=== Out on loan ===
Note: Flags indicate national team as defined under FIFA eligibility rules; some limited exceptions apply. Players may hold more than one non-FIFA nationality.

No.	Pos.	Nation	Player
4	DF	GER	Yannick Mausehund (at TSV Havelse until 30 June 2027)
12	MF	EST	Patrik Kristal (at Thun until 30 June 2027)

== Past managers ==
- (Germany) Hans-Dieter Roos (1972–1975)
- (Germany) Erich Rutemöller (1980–1985)
- (Germany) Roland Koch (1987–1989)
- (Germany) Bernd Krauss (1990)
- (Germany) Eberhard Vogel (1991–1992)
- (Germany) Stephan Engels (1994–1995)
- (Germany) Mathias Hönerbach (1995–1996)
- (Germany) Christoph John (1998–2007)
- (Germany) Frank Schaefer (2007–2010)
- (Germany) Thomas Rainer (2010–2011)
- (Germany) Dirk Lottner (2011–2012)
- (Germany) Thomas Rainer (2012)
- (Germany) Dirk Lottner (2012–2014)
- (Germany) Stephan Engels (2014–)
