= Aachener Straße/Gürtel station =

Railway station in Germany

Coordinates: 50°56′13″N 6°54′31″E

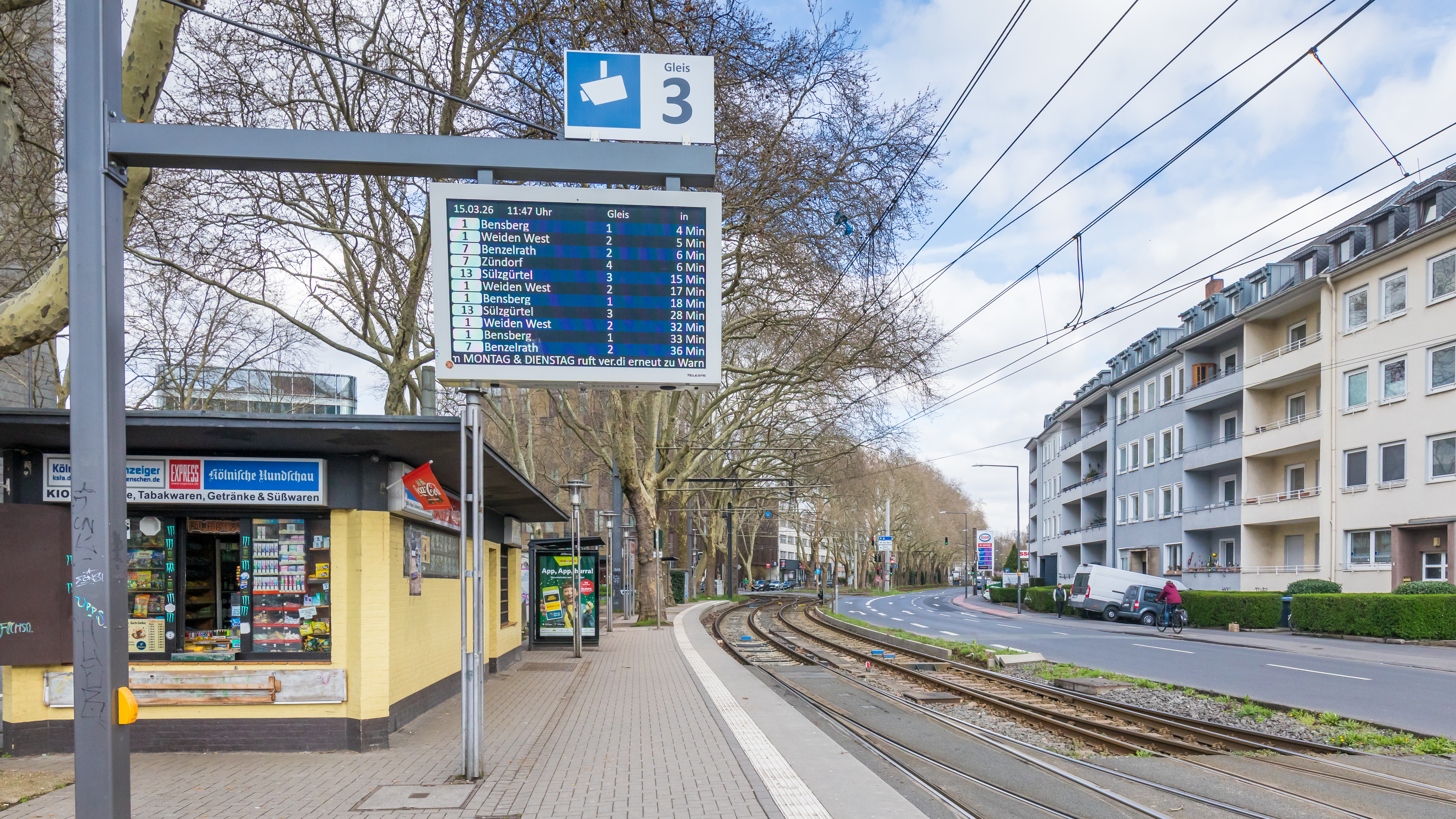
Aachener Straße/Gürtel light rail station, platform for light rail lines 7 and 13 heading south, Cologne

Aachener Straße/Gürtel is an interchange station on the Cologne Stadtbahn lines 1, 7, and 13 in the district of Lindenthal in Cologne, North Rhine-Westphalia, Germany.

The station is located at the junction of Aachener Straße and the Cologne Belt (Gürtel). The station has four separate side platforms, each on one of the four median strips facing the junction.

Preceding station	Cologne Stadtbahn	Following station
Maarweg towards Köln-Weiden West	Line 1	Melaten towards Bensberg
Wüllnerstraße towards Frechen-Benzelrath	Line 7	Melaten towards Zündorf
Wüllnerstraße towards Sülzgürtel	Line 13	Melatengürtel towards Holweide Vischeringstraße

== See also ==
- List of Cologne KVB stations
