= Arnulfstraße station =

Railway station in Germany

Coordinates: 50°55′6″N 6°55′48″E

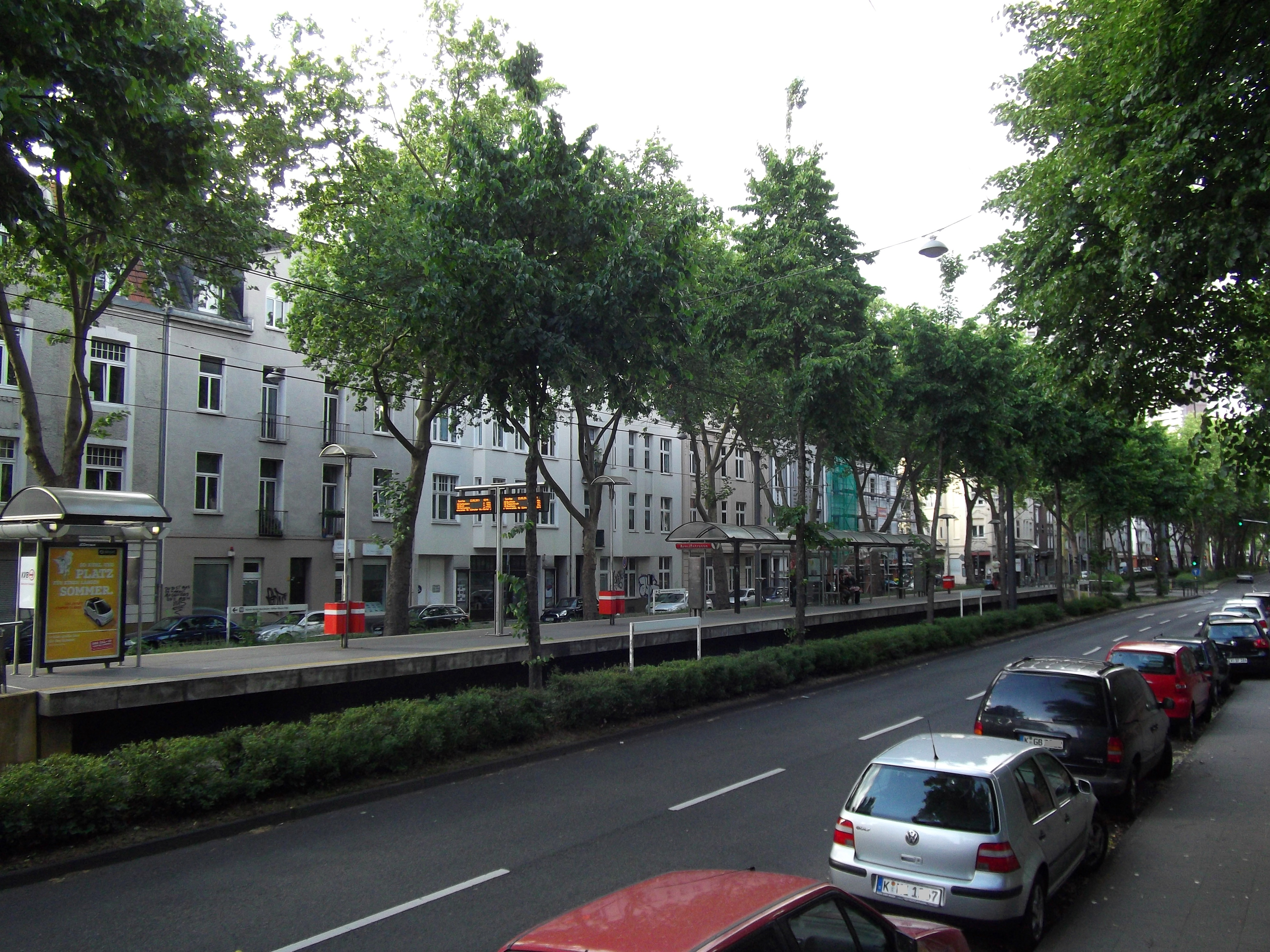
Arnulfstraße station in 2011

Arnulfstraße is a station on the Cologne Stadtbahn line 18, located in the Cologne district of Lindenthal. The station lies on Luxemburger Straße, adjacent to nearby Arnulfstraße, after which the station is named. Right next to it is the Weißhaus, after which Weißhausstraße and Weißhausstraße station are named. Due to its proximity to three Gymnasien (high schools), Schillergymnasium, Hildegard of Bingen Gymnasium and Elisabeth of Thuringia Gymnasium, it is often used by students.

== See also ==
- List of Cologne KVB stations

Preceding station	Cologne Stadtbahn	Following station
Sülzburgstraße towards Bonn Hbf	Line 18	Weißhausstraße towards Thielenbruch
