= Lukas Kwasniok =

Polish footballer and manager

Personal information
- Date of birth: 12 June 1981 (age 45)
- Place of birth: Gliwice, Poland
- Height: 1.78 m (5 ft 10 in)
- Position: Midfielder

Youth career
- –1999: Karlsruher SC

Senior career*
Years	Team	Apps	(Gls)
1999–2001	Arminia Bielefeld		
2000–2001	→ SV Sandhausen (loan)		
2001–2005	Rastatt 04		
2005–2007	Germania Friedrichstal		

Managerial career
- 2007–2008: OSV Rastatt
- 2008–2014: TSV 05 Reichenbach
- 2016: Karlsruher SC (interim)
- 2018–2019: Carl Zeiss Jena
- 2019–2021: 1. FC Saarbrücken
- 2021–2025: SC Paderborn
- 2025–2026: 1. FC Köln
- * Club domestic league appearances and goals

Lukas Kwasniok (born 12 June 1981) is a Polish-German professional football manager and former player who was most recently the head coach of Bundesliga club 1. FC Köln.

== Career ==
On 4 December 2016, Kwasniok was announced as the interim replacement for Tomas Oral at Karlsruher SC, as the club were struggling in the 2. Bundesliga, and replaced on 22 December 2016.

On 9 December 2018, he was named head coach of Carl Zeiss Jena. He was sacked on 28 September 2019.

In December 2019, he was announced as the new manager of 1. FC Saarbrücken starting on 1 January 2020. He announced that he would leave after the 2020–21 season.

On 17 May 2021, 2. Bundesliga club SC Paderborn announced Kwasniok as head coach, succeeding Steffen Baumgart until 2023. In April 2025, the club announced that it will part ways with Kwasniok at the end of the season. On 6 June 2025, he was named the new head coach of newly promoted Bundesliga club 1. FC Köln, by signing a contract until 2028.

On 22 March 2026, he was sacked following a 3–3 draw at home against rivals Borussia Mönchengladbach, with René Wagner assuming caretaker responsibility.

== Managerial statistics ==
As of match played 14 March 2026

Team	From	To	Record								Ref
Team	From	To	G	W	D	L	GF	GA	GD	Win %	Ref
Karlsruher SC (interim)	4 December 2016	22 December 2016	2	0	2	0	0	0	+0	0.00	
Carl Zeiss Jena	9 December 2018	28 September 2019	33	9	9	15	41	45	−4	27.27	
1. FC Saarbrücken	23 December 2019	30 June 2021	48	19	14	15	76	61	+15	39.58	
SC Paderborn	1 July 2021	30 June 2025	144	63	36	45	263	198	+65	43.75	
1. FC Köln	1 July 2025	22 March 2026	29	7	8	14	41	52	−11	24.14	
Total			256	98	69	89	421	357	+64	38.28	—
