= Eifelwall/Stadtarchiv station =

Railway station in Germany

Coordinates: 50.92462°N 6.93683°E

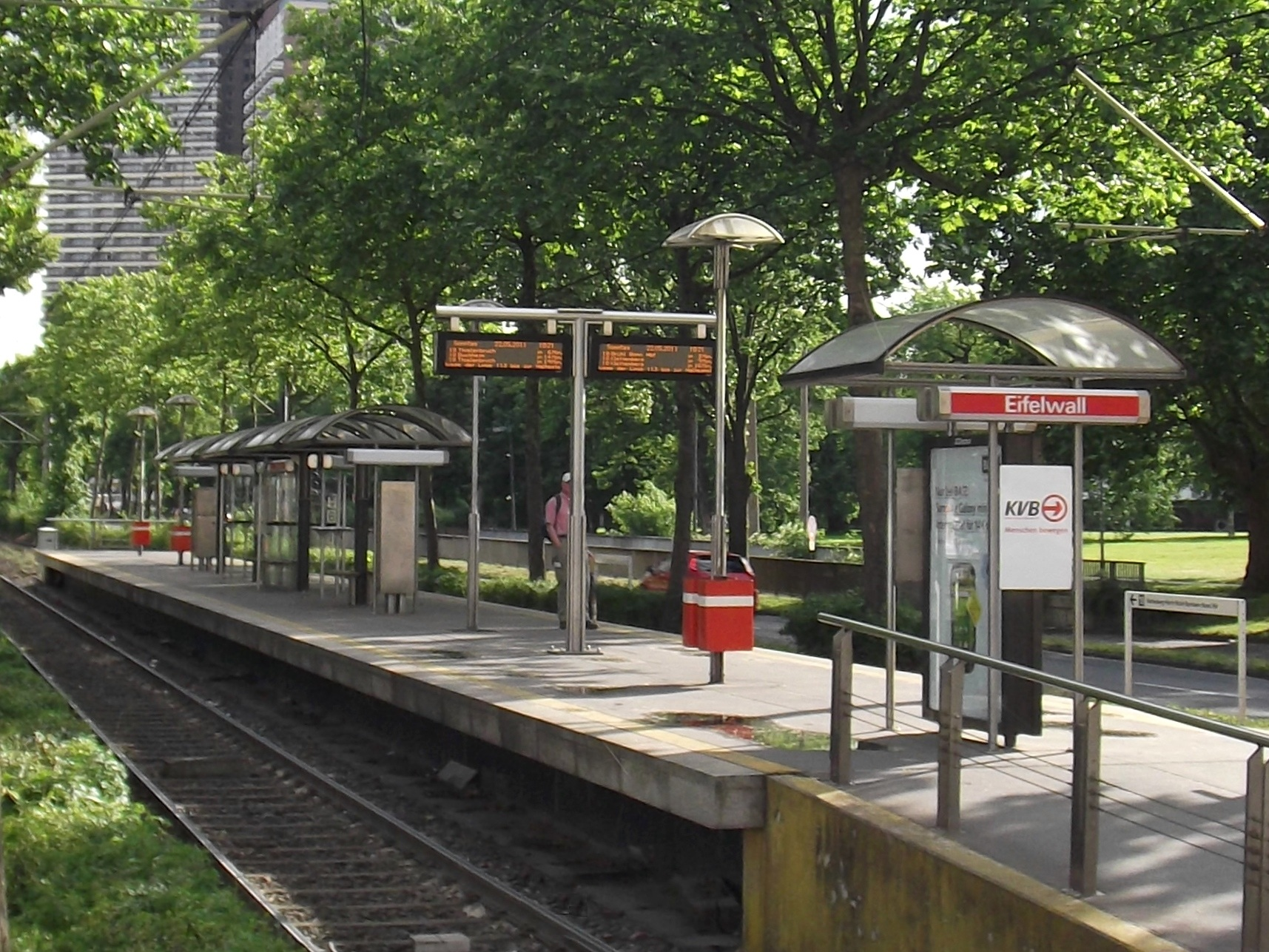
Eifelwall station in 2011

Eifelwall/Stadtarchiv is a station on the Cologne Stadtbahn line 18, located in the Cologne district of Lindenthal. The station lies on Luxemburger Straße, adjacent to nearby Eifelwall, after which the station is named. It is also right next to the extensive parks of the inner green belt.

The station was opened in 1898 and consists of one island platform with two rail tracks.

On December 13, 2020, the station was renamed from Eifelwall to Eifelwall/Stadtarchiv, because of the new building of the Historical Archive of Cologne that's adjacent to it.

== See also ==
- List of Cologne KVB stations

Preceding station	Cologne Stadtbahn	Following station
Weißhausstraße towards Bonn Hbf	Line 18	Barbarossaplatz towards Thielenbruch
