= Sülzburgstraße station =

Railway station in Germany

Coordinates: 50°54′55″N 6°55′38″E

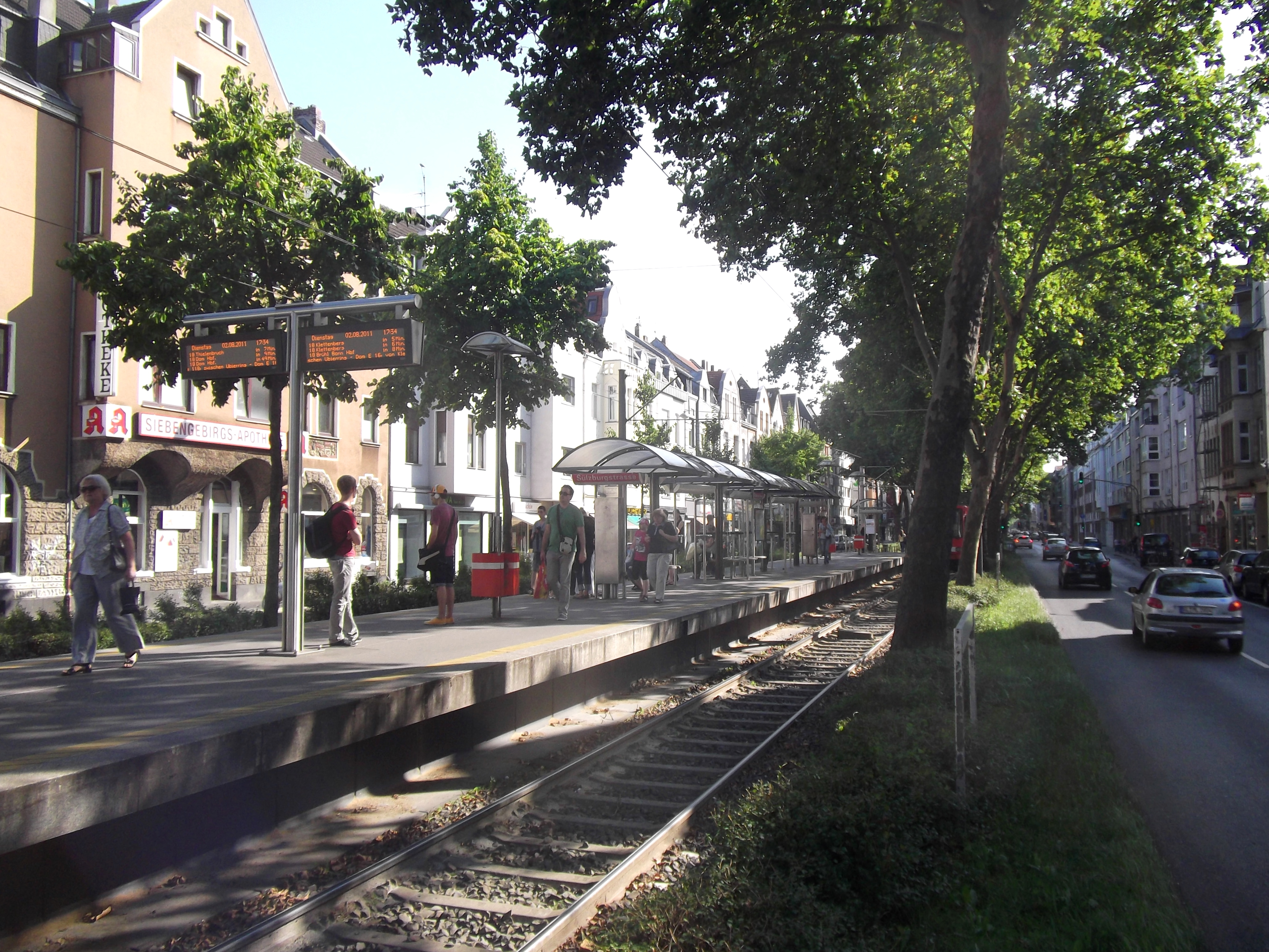
Sülzburgstraße station

Sülzburgstraße is a station on the Cologne Stadtbahn line 18, located in the Cologne district of Lindenthal. The station lies on Luxemburger Straße at its junction with the shopping street Sülzburgstraße, after which the station is named.

The station was opened in 1898 and consists of one island platform with two rail tracks.

== See also ==
- List of Cologne KVB stations

| Preceding station | Cologne Stadtbahn | Following station |
|---|---|---|
| Sülzgürtel towards Bonn Hbf | Line 18 | Arnulfstraße towards Thielenbruch |
