= Weißhausstraße station =

Railway station in Cologne, Germany

Coordinates: 50°55′17″N 6°56′0″E

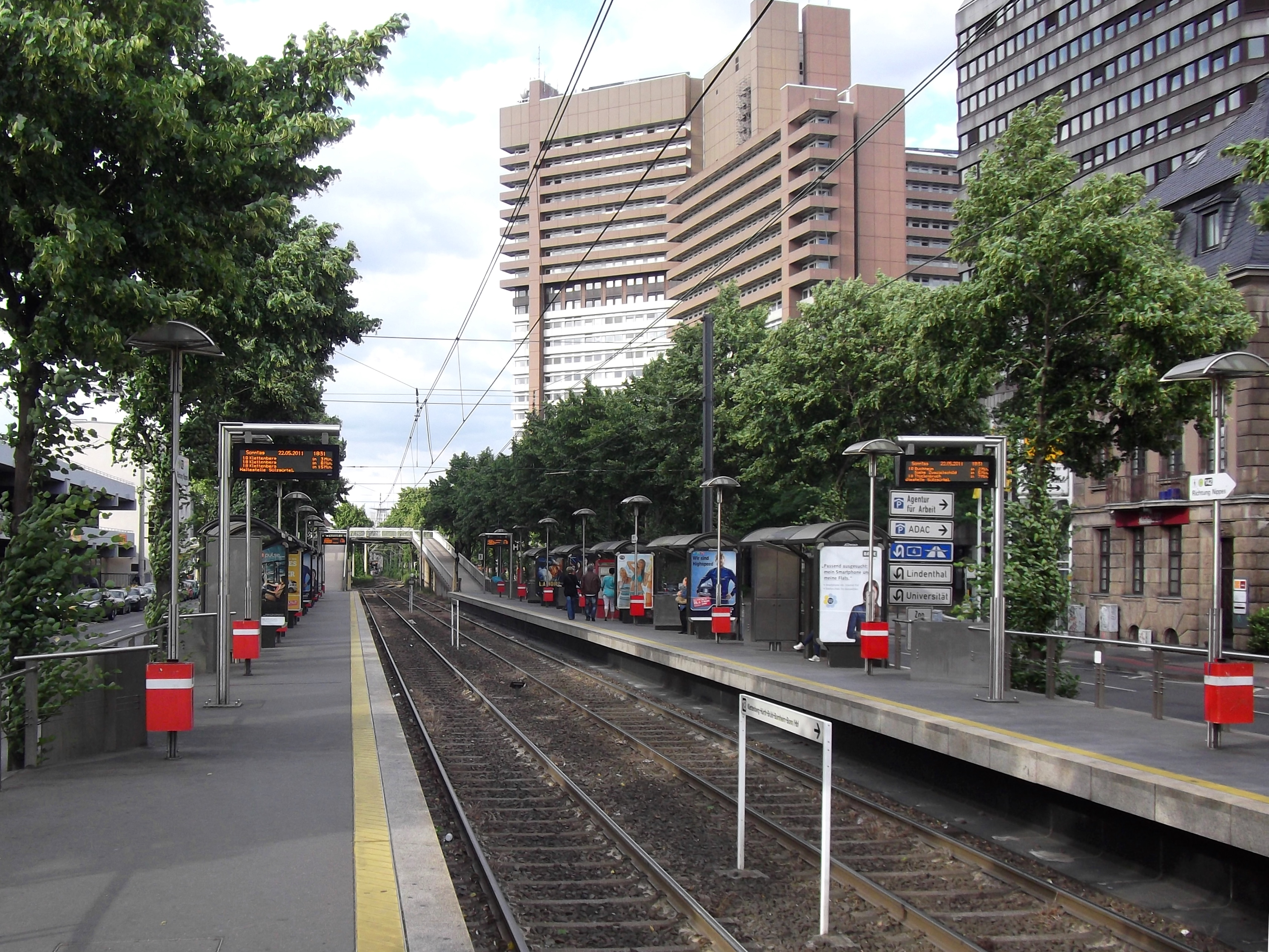
Weißhausstraße station in 2011

Weißhausstraße is a station on the Cologne Stadtbahn line 18, located in the Cologne district of Lindenthal. The station lies on Luxemburger Straße, at its junction with Universitätsstraße/Weißhausstraße, after the latter of which the station is named. It's close to the University of Cologne, the Justizzentrum and Uni-Center Cologne, and the inner green belt.

The station was opened in 1898 and consists of two side platforms with two rail tracks.

The proposed ring line 14, that's planned to run on Universitätsstraße/Weißhausstraße, would cross the tracks of line 18 and probably get a platform at the station as well, if it gets built.

== See also ==
- List of Cologne KVB stations

Preceding station	Cologne Stadtbahn	Following station
Arnulfstraße towards Bonn Hbf	Line 18	Eifelwall/Stadtarchiv towards Thielenbruch
