= Wüllnerstraße station =

Rail station

Coordinates: 50°55′52″N 6°54′28″E

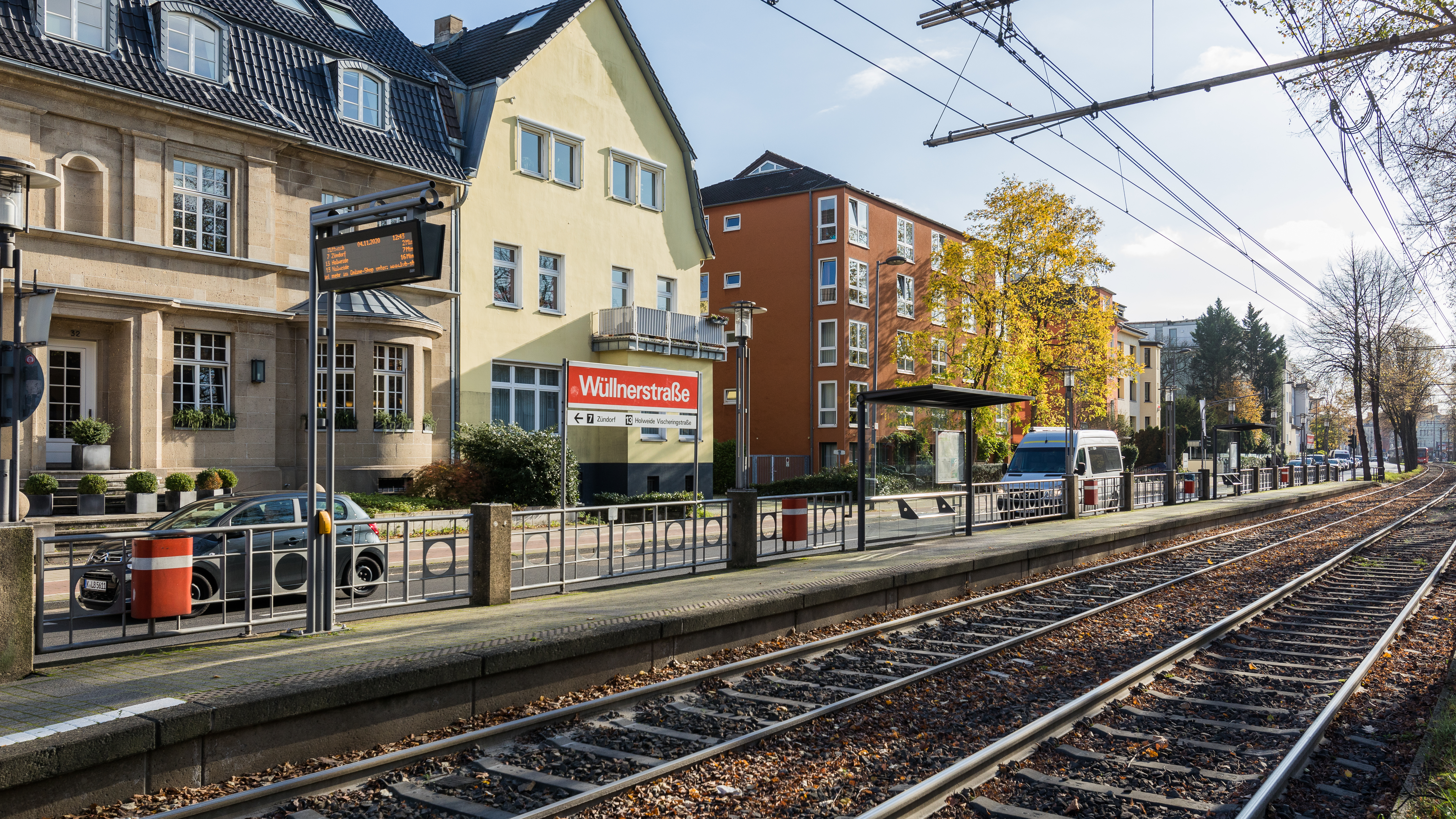
Stadtbahn station Wüllnerstraße

Wüllnerstraße is a Cologne Stadtbahn station served by lines 7 and 13. Like the section from Barbarossaplatz to Ubierring the station is one where both high- and low-floor vehicles stop on the same platform.

This station is located on Stadtwaldgürtel in Köln-Braunsfeld.

== See also ==
- List of Cologne KVB stations

Preceding station	Cologne Stadtbahn	Following station
Dürener Straße/Gürtel towards Frechen-Benzelrath	Line 7	Aachener Straße/Gürtel towards Zündorf
Dürener Straße/Gürtel towards Sülzgürtel	Line 13	Aachener Straße/Gürtel towards Holweide Vischeringstraße
