= René Wagner (football coach) =

German football coach (born 1988)

Personal information
- Full name: René Wagner
- Date of birth: 17 July 1988 (age 38)
- Place of birth: Dresden, East Germany
- Positions: Centre back; full back

Team information
- Current team: 1. FC Köln (head coach)

Youth career
- –2007: SC Borea Dresden

College career
| Years | Team | Apps | (Gls) |
| 2012 | Hawaii Pacific Sharks | 3 | (?) |

Senior career*
| Years | Team | Apps | (Gls) |
| 2007–2008 | SV 07 Eschwege | 1 | (0) |
| 2008–2009 | Torgelower SV Greif | 23 | (1) |
| 2009–2011 | VfB Oldenburg | 45 | (4) |
| 2011–2012 | Dynamo Dresden II | 24 | (0) |
| 2013–2014 | VFC Plauen | 25 | (0) |
| 2014 | Wacker Nordhausen | 3 | (0) |
| 2014 | Wacker Nordhausen II | 9 | (1) |
| 2015 | Bischofswerdaer FV 08 | 14 | (0) |
| Total | | 144 | (6) |

Managerial career
- 2017–2019: Palm Beach United (youth)
- 2026: 1. FC Köln (caretaker)
- 2026–: 1. FC Köln
- * Club domestic league appearances and goals

René Wagner (born 17 July 1988) is a German professional football manager and former player. He is currently the head coach of Bundesliga club 1. FC Köln.

== Playing career ==
Wagner was an amateur footballer from 2007 to 2012, after which he received a scholarship to Hawai'i Pacific University, making three appearances for the varsity team, the Hawaii Pacific Sharks.

== Managerial career ==
=== Early coaching in the US ===
Returning to Hawaii in 2015 to work as a research assistant, Wagner was an assistant coach at his former college team, before being offered a job as a youth coach at Palm Beach United. There, he coached the son of golf legend Tiger Woods. While in Florida with Inter Miami's youth setup, Wagner met former Germany international Marcel Schäfer, who helped him establish contact with SC Paderborn back in Germany.

=== Assistant in Germany ===
From 2020 to 2025, Wagner was Steffen Baumgart's assistant at Paderborn, Köln, Hamburger SV and Union Berlin. In summer 2025, he chose to leave Baumgart and return to Köln under Lukas Kwasniok, whom Wagner was chosen to replace as head coach on an interim basis on 22 March 2026. Though winning just one of the remaining seven Bundesliga matches of the season, Wagner steered Köln away from relegation, and was promoted to permanent head coach on 22 May 2026.

=== 1. FC Köln ===
Wagner began his tenure as permanent Köln manager with a 3–2 win over TSG Hoffenheim in their Bundesliga opener, the beginning of a run of strong results at the RheinEnergieStadion which included victory over Borussia Mönchengladbach in the Rhine derby. Wagner's side also reached the third round of the 2026–27 DFB-Pokal thanks to a 5–0 win over Union Berlin.
