= Johannes Linßen =

German footballer and manager (1949–2025)

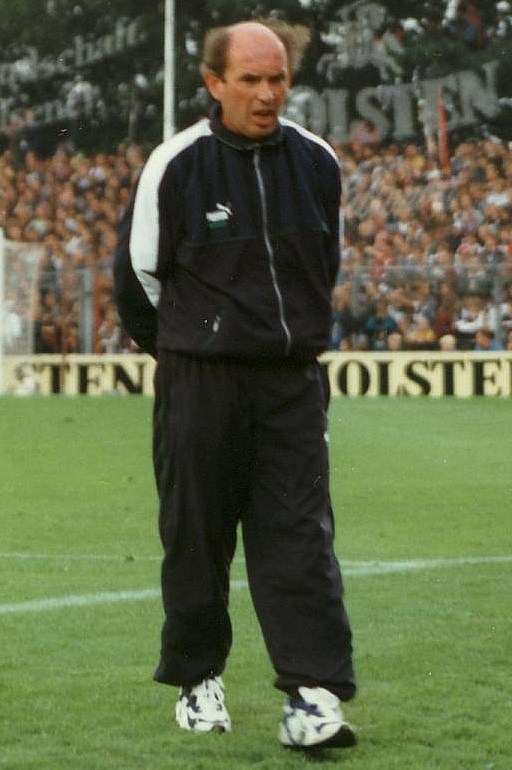
- Linßen as manager of FC Gütersloh in the 1997–98 season

Personal information
- Date of birth: 28 September 1949
- Place of birth: Wachtendonk, North Rhine-Westphalia, West Germany
- Date of death: 31 October 2025 (aged 76)
- Place of death: Germany
- Height: 1.73 m (5 ft 8 in)
- Position: Midfielder

Senior career*
Years	Team	Apps	(Gls)
1968–1974	MSV Duisburg	113	(9)
1974–1984	Fortuna Köln	311	(44)

International career
1971	West Germany U23	4	(0)

Managerial career
- 1984–1986: Fortuna Köln
- 1987–1989: Fortuna Köln
- 1993–1995: Fortuna Köln
- 1996–1998: FC Gütersloh
- * Club domestic league appearances and goals

Johannes "Hannes" Linßen (or Linssen; 28 September 1949 – 31 October 2025) was a German football player, coach and manager.

== Playing career ==
Linßen began his career with Bundesliga club MSV Duisburg in 1968 before dropping a division in 1974 to join Fortuna Köln, where he remained until the end of his career in 1984. He played in the 1983 final of the DFB cup, which his team lost 1–0 to local rivals 1. FC Köln.

On 23 January 1971, while playing for MSV Duisburg against Rot-Weiß Oberhausen, Linßen received the first ever yellow card to be awarded in the Bundesliga, although the card should in fact have been awarded to his teammate Đorđe Pavlić, the referee having confused the two players.

== Managerial career ==
Following his retirement as a player, Linßen was appointed manager of Fortuna Köln in 1984. He remained in charge until a bad start to the 1986–87 season led to his departure. He had a second stint as manager of the club from April 1987 to August 1989. Linßen was assistant manager of 1. FC Köln from July 1990 until February 1993, after which he had a third spell as manager of SC Fortuna Köln. His final managerial position was with FC Gütersloh from 1996 to 1998.

Linßen returned to 1. FC Köln as director of football in 1998. During his three-and-a-half years in this position, the club achieved promotion to the Bundesliga in 2000. But by 2002 the club were heading towards relegation and, amid much personal criticism, particularly for the eight-year contract given to 12-year-old Marco Quotschalla, Linßen resigned on 11 February.

== Death ==
Linßen died on 31 October 2025, at the age of 76.
