= Karl-Heinz Heddergott =

German football manager (1926–2021)

Personal information
- Date of birth: 27 August 1926
- Place of birth: Düsseldorf, Germany
- Date of death: 27 May 2021 (aged 94)

Managerial career
- Years: Team
- 1980: 1. FC Köln
- 1980–1982: Egypt
- 1988: Oman

Karl-Heinz Heddergott (27 August 1926 – 27 May 2021) was a German professional football manager.

== Career ==
=== Coaching career ===
An alumnus of German Sport University Cologne, he was a member of the German Football Association from 1967 to 1980. He was hired by the United States Soccer Federation (USSF) as the director of coaching in 1984. He also managed 1. FC Köln, as well as the national teams of Egypt and Oman.
