= Stefan Ruthenbeck =

German football player and manager

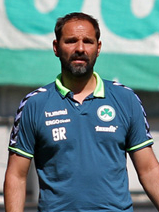
- Ruthenbeck in 2016

Personal information
- Date of birth: 19 April 1972 (age 54)
- Place of birth: Cologne, West Germany
- Position: Defender

Senior career*
Years	Team	Apps	(Gls)
- 1. FC Quadrath-Ichendorf
- SpVgg Oberaußem-Fortuna
- FV Rheinbrohl
1999–2008	TuS Mayen	2	(0)

Managerial career
- 2004–2010: TuS Mayen
- 2010–2012: SpVgg EGC Wirges
- 2012–2013: VfR Aalen II
- 2013–2015: VfR Aalen
- 2015–2016: SpVgg Greuther Fürth
- 2017: 1. FC Köln U19
- 2017–2018: 1. FC Köln
- 2018–: 1. FC Köln U19
- * Club domestic league appearances and goals

Stefan Ruthenbeck (born 19 April 1972) is a German football manager and former player who played as a defender. He last managed 1. FC Köln.

== Playing career ==
Ruthenbeck played for 1. FC Quadrath-Ichendorf, SpVgg Oberaußem-Fortuna, FV Rheinbrohl and TuS Mayen before starting his managerial career also in Tus Mayen.

== Coaching career ==
=== Early career ===
He managed TuS Mayen and SpVgg EGC Wirges before signed by VfR Aalen II as their manager and youth coordinator.

=== VfR Aalen ===
On 14 Juni 2014, Ruthenbeck signed a contract with VfR Aalen until 2015.

=== Greuther Fürth ===
Ruthenbeck was appointed as the head coach on 12 June 2015. He was sacked on 21 November 2016.

=== 1. FC Köln ===
Ruthenbeck was appointed as the new coach of 1. FC Köln on 3 December 2017. In April 2018, it was announced that his contract would not be renewed at the end of the 2018–19 campaign.

== Personal life ==
Ruthenbeck is married and has two daughters. He's a fan of heavy metal music.
