= Marco Quotschalla =

German footballer (born 1988)

Personal information
- Date of birth: 25 July 1988 (age 38)
- Place of birth: Cologne, West Germany
- Height: 1.84 m (6 ft 0 in)
- Position: Forward

Youth career
- 1996–1999: Taxofit Fußball Internat Köln
- 1999–2001: Bayer Leverkusen
- 2001–2005: 1. FC Köln
- 2005–2007: Alemannia Aachen

Senior career*
Years	Team	Apps	(Gls)
2006	Alemannia Aachen	2	(0)
2007–2008	Alemannia Aachen II	22	(2)
2009	Germania Dattenfeld		
2009–2010	Bonner SC	30	(6)
2010–2012	Schalke 04 II	45	(5)
2012–2013	Wuppertaler SV	33	(7)
2013–2014	Eintracht Trier	45	(11)
2014–2015	Orlandina		
2015	TuS Koblenz	13	(1)
2015–2016	Rodange 91		
2016–2017	Sportfreunde Baumberg	18	(3)
- * Club domestic league appearances and goals

Marco Quotschalla (born 25 July 1988) is a German former professional footballer who played as a forward.

== Career ==
Born in Cologne and raised in Pulheim, Quotschalla played in the youth systems of Bayer Leverkusen, 1. FC Köln, and Alemannia Aachen and played two matches for Aachen in the Bundesliga in the 2006–07 season. At 1. FC Köln, at the age of 12, he signed an eight-year contract. In January 2009, he left for Germania Dattenfeld. After half a season with Germania Dattenfeld, he signed with Bonner SC in the summer of 2009. Following a successful season, he signed a two-year contract with Schalke 04 II on 25 July 2010. Eighteen months later, he signed for Wuppertaler SV, where he spent a year before joining Eintracht Trier in January 2013. He was released by the club eighteen months later.

In July 2014 he was confirmed to have signed a contract with Italian Serie D club Orlandina, under the new guidance of head coach Viktor Pasulko.

In July 2015 Quotschalla joined Luxembourgish side Rodange 91 for a season with the option of a further season, before returning to Germany the following season.
