= 1. FC Köln =

Association football club in Germany

- Full name: 1. Fußball-Club Köln 01/07 e. V.
- Nicknames: Die Geißböcke (The Billy Goats); Effzeh
- Founded: 13 February 1948; 78 years ago
- Stadium: RheinEnergieStadion
- Capacity: 50,000
- President: Jörn Stobbe
- Head coach: René Wagner
- League: Bundesliga
- 2025–26: Bundesliga, 14th of 18
- Website: fc.de
Home colours	Away colours	Third colours

1. Fußball-Club Köln 01/07 e. V., better known as simply 1. FC Köln (German pronunciation: [ɛf ˈt͡seː ˈkœln]) or FC Cologne in English, is a German professional football club based in Cologne, North Rhine-Westphalia. It was formed in 1948 as a merger of the clubs Kölner Ballspiel-Club 1901 and SpVgg Sülz 07. Köln compete in the first-tier Bundesliga after winning the 2024–25 2. Bundesliga season and plays its home matches at RheinEnergieStadion.

1. FC Köln was formed in 1948 through the merger of Kölner BC 01 and SpVgg Sülz 07, two successful local sides. It was a founding member of the Bundesliga in 1963 and was crowned its inaugural champions the following year. The club enjoyed golden eras in the 1960s and 1980s, winning three national championships and four DFB-Pokal titles; this includes the inaugural Bundesliga and a domestic double in 1978. After a decline beginning in the 1990s, Köln became known as yo-yo club due to frequent promotions and relegations between the top two tiers. A resurgence in the 2010s brought European qualification and financial stability, but recent seasons have been marked by relegation struggles.

The club is nicknamed Die Geißböcke (The Billy Goats) in reference to its mascot, a male goat named Hennes after veteran Köln player and manager Hennes Weisweiler. The first Hennes was donated by a circus entrepreneur as a Cologne carnival joke. The current mascot is Hennes IX as of 1 August 2019 after Hennes VIII was retired by the club due to old age. Another nickname for the club, more common locally due to its ambiguity, is FC (often written as Effzeh), a common German abbreviation for football clubs. Characteristic for the dialect spoken around Cologne, this is pronounced "EF-tsay", in contrast to the Standard German pronunciation of the abbreviation where the second syllable is emphasized ([ʔɛf ˈtseː]).

Köln play at home in white and red, both colours having been used as the main shirt colour throughout its history. The club's longest-standing and fiercest rivalry is with Borussia Mönchengladbach, against whom they contest the Rhine derby. Although Mönchengladbach is not located along the Rhine, both clubs are based in the Rhineland cultural region. Köln also shares rivalries with two other Rhineland-based clubs: Fortuna Düsseldorf and Bayer Leverkusen.

Like many of Germany's other professional football clubs, 1. FC Köln is part of a larger sports club with teams in other sports like handball, table tennis and gymnastics. 1. FC Köln has over 150,000 members, making it the fourth largest club in Germany.

== History ==
=== Predecessor sides ===
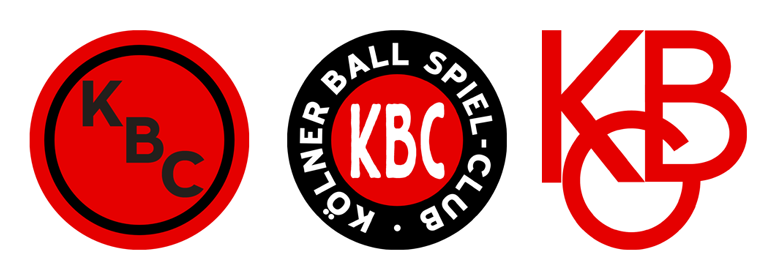
Historical logos of predecessor side Kölner BC

Kölner BC was formed on 6 June 1901 by a group of young men who were unhappy as part of the gymnastics club FC Borussia Köln and were more interested in football. BC participated in the Zehnerliga West in the years before World War I and took the Westdeutsche championship in 1912 and advanced to the preliminary rounds of the national finals. Their next best result was in the 1920 league final, where they lost 1–3 to Borussia Mönchengladbach.

Spielvereinigung 1907 Köln-Sülz was established in 1907 as Sülzer Sportverein and on 1 January 1919 merged with Fußball Club 1908 Hertha Sülz to form SpVgg. They won the Westdeutscher title in 1928, but lost in the early rounds of the national finals. They went on to play as a top flight club in the Gauliga Mittelrhein, one of sixteen premier level divisions established in 1933 in the reorganization of German football under the Third Reich. After winning a divisional championship in 1939, – they then entered a period of decline in the early 1940s. After the 1941 season, the Gauliga Mittlerhein was split into two new divisions: the Gauliga Köln-Aachen and the Gauliga Moselland, which included clubs from occupied Luxembourg. Sülz struggled until they were united with VfL Köln 1899 for the 1943–44 season, to form the combined wartime side Kriegspielgemeinschaft VfL 99/Sülz 07, which would end up winning the Gauliga Köln-Aachen title by a single point over SG Düren 99 in a close race. The club did not play the next campaign as war overtook the region.

=== A successful new club ===
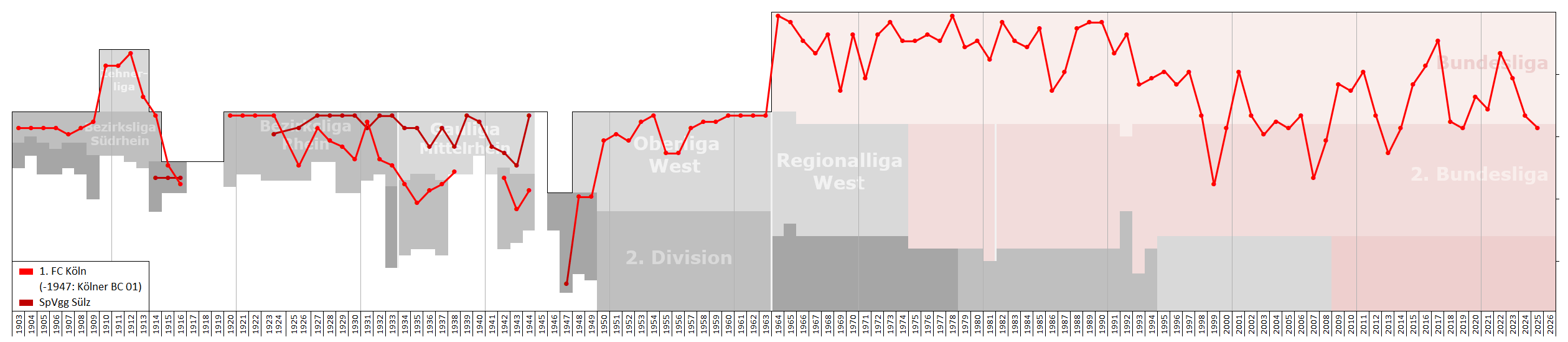
Historical chart of 1. FC Köln league performance

After the union of these two predecessor sides (1948), 1. FC Köln began play in the Oberliga West in the 1949–50 season, and, by 1953–54, had won their first divisional championship. In 1954, they lost the DFB-Pokal final 1–0 to VfB Stuttgart. Die Geißböcke won their second Oberliga West title in 1959–60, and appeared in the national final against Hamburger SV, where they lost 3–2. Köln also finished first in the Oberliga West from 1960–61 to 1962–63. They won the 1962 German championship final 4–0 against 1. FC Nürnberg, becoming German champions for the first time, and qualified for the 1962–63 European Cup, where they were one of the favourites to win the trophy. In the first round, Köln visited Dundee of Scotland and lost 8–1, and despite winning the second leg back in Germany by 4–0, they were eliminated from the tournament. In the following year's German championship final, they lost 3–1 to Borussia Dortmund.

=== Continuing success ===
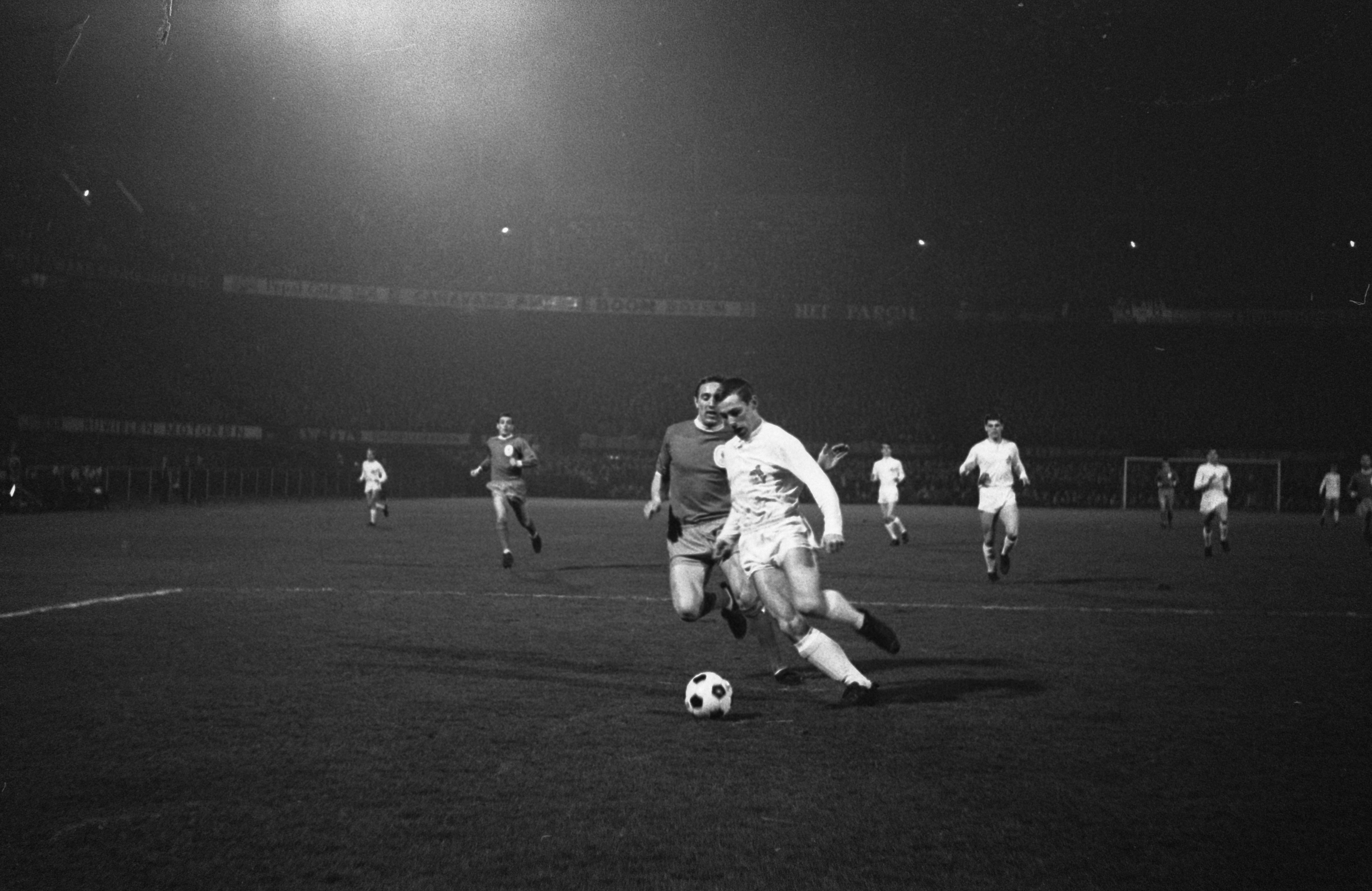
Köln vs Liverpool, 1965 European Cup

In 1963, FC Köln became one of the 16 founder members of the Bundesliga, Germany's new professional football league. Köln continued their winning ways by becoming the first Bundesliga champion, in the league's inaugural 1963–64 season. As German champions, Köln entered the 1964–65 European Cup, where it met England's Liverpool at the quarter-final stage. After two 0–0 draws, a third game was played which was also a stalemate, this time 2–2. As the penalty shootout had not yet been introduced as the means of deciding a tie, Köln went out of the competition on the toss of a coin. Ironically enough, there was the need for a second coin toss because the first time the coin stuck vertically in the ground. Köln also became the first Bundesliga side to field a Brazilian player, when it signed Zézé from Madureira for a then club record fee of DM 150,000. Domestically, Köln recorded a second-place finish in the 1964–65 Bundesliga season and won its first DFB-Pokal in 1967–68.

At the start of the 1970s, Köln reached three DFB-Pokal finals in four seasons, losing all three; to Kickers Offenbach in 1970, Bayern Munich in 1971 and Borussia Mönchengladbach in 1973. The team also achieved another second place Bundesliga finish in 1973, before reaching another DFB-Pokal final in 1977, beating Hertha BSC over two legs to win the trophy for the second time.

In 1977–78, Köln enjoyed their most successful season, winning the Bundesliga title, its third national title overall, and retaining the DFB-Pokal, beating local rivals Fortuna Düsseldorf 2–0. Köln became the second club to claim the double in the Bundesliga era.

Köln had another losing DFB-Pokal final appearance in 1980, before winning the competition for a fourth time in 1983. In 1986, the club appeared in its first European final, losing 5–3 on aggregate to Real Madrid in the UEFA Cup Final. Two second place Bundesliga finishes, in 1988–89 and 1989–90, and another DFB-Pokal final loss in 1991, marked the end of a successful thirty-year spell for Köln.

=== Downfall ===
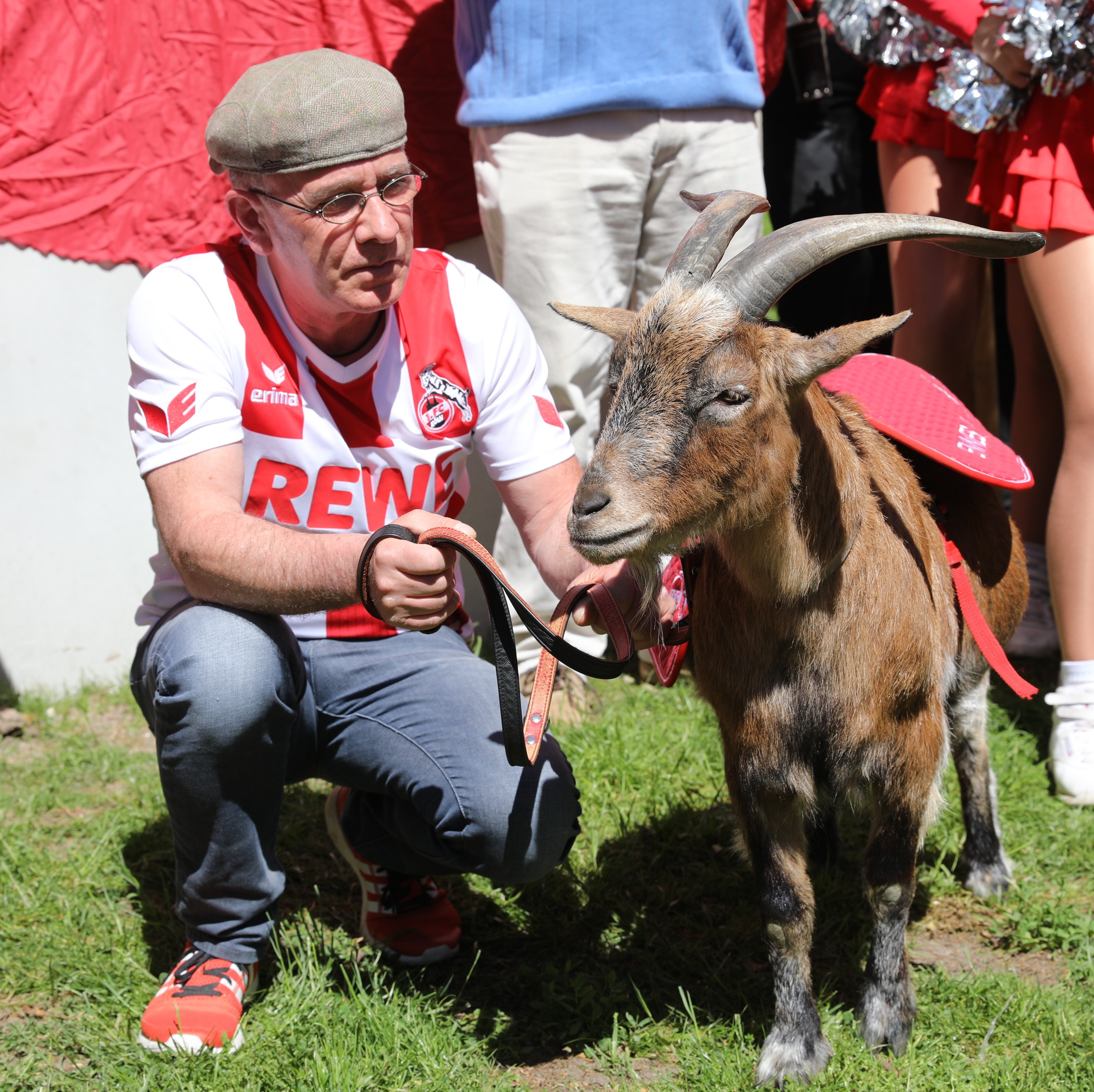
Mascot Hennes VIII

In the early years of the Bundesliga, 1. FC Köln was the most successful Bundesliga club in terms of total points won. Beginning in the early 1990s, however, the club's performance declined, and in 1998 it was relegated for the first time. The side became a "yo-yo team", moving between the first and second divisions: they went up or down each season between 2001–02 and 2005–06. During this period, the FC also set the record for the longest goalless streak in Bundesliga history in the 2001–02 season, with 1034 minutes (equivalent to 11-and-a-half games) until Thomas Cichon scored.

In late 2006, former coach Christoph Daum returned to Köln, and succeeded in leading the club back to the Bundesliga in 2008. After asuring Köln's Bundesliga status in the 2008–09 campaign, Daum left Köln for his former club Fenerbahçe. Köln's former star-striker Lukas Podolski returned for the 2009–10 season.

The club was relegated at the end of the 2011–12 season, finishing in 17th place, having accumulated €33m debt, and €11m negative equity.

=== Turnaround (2012–2017) ===
In April 2012, the club members elected a new board of directors, Werner Spinner as president, Markus Ritterbach for marketing, and Toni Schumacher for sport. In the 2012–13 season, under new trainer Holger Stanislawski, Köln finished in fifth place in the 2. Bundesliga, missing out on promotion back to the top division.

In 2012 the board hired Jörg Jakobs as director of football, who then got promoted in 2014 to sporting director, chief scout and director of the academy. In January 2013, Alexander Wehrle joined as managing director of Köln. Wehrle was working as assistant for VfB Stuttgart president Erwin Staudt, especially for rebuilding the stadium. In summer 2013, Peter Stöger and Manfred Schmid were hired as coaching team, and Jörg Schmadtke as general manager. In 2013–14, Köln finished first in the 2. Bundesliga and earned promotion to the top division. It was followed by a 12th place 2014–15, ninth in 2015–16, and a fifth place in 2016–17, which saw them qualify for the 2017–18 UEFA Europa League, their first European campaign in 25 years. After restructuring and repaying debt, equity turned from €11m negative to €20m positive. The turnover increased from €56m in 2012–13 to more than €120m in 2016–17.

=== Decline and changes (2018–) ===
After the club's return the European stage, fortunes quickly changed. The team experienced an unsuccessful start to the 2017–18 Bundesliga season gaining only three points from its first sixteen matches. At the same time, the club's Europa League campaign ended in the group stage. This downtrend led to the resignation of Jörg Schmadtke and Stöger's dismissal in December 2017; he was replaced by Stefan Ruthenbeck, who was appointed as caretaker manager. In spite of an improved record in the second half of the season, the team finished last and were relegated to 2. Bundesliga at the end of the year.

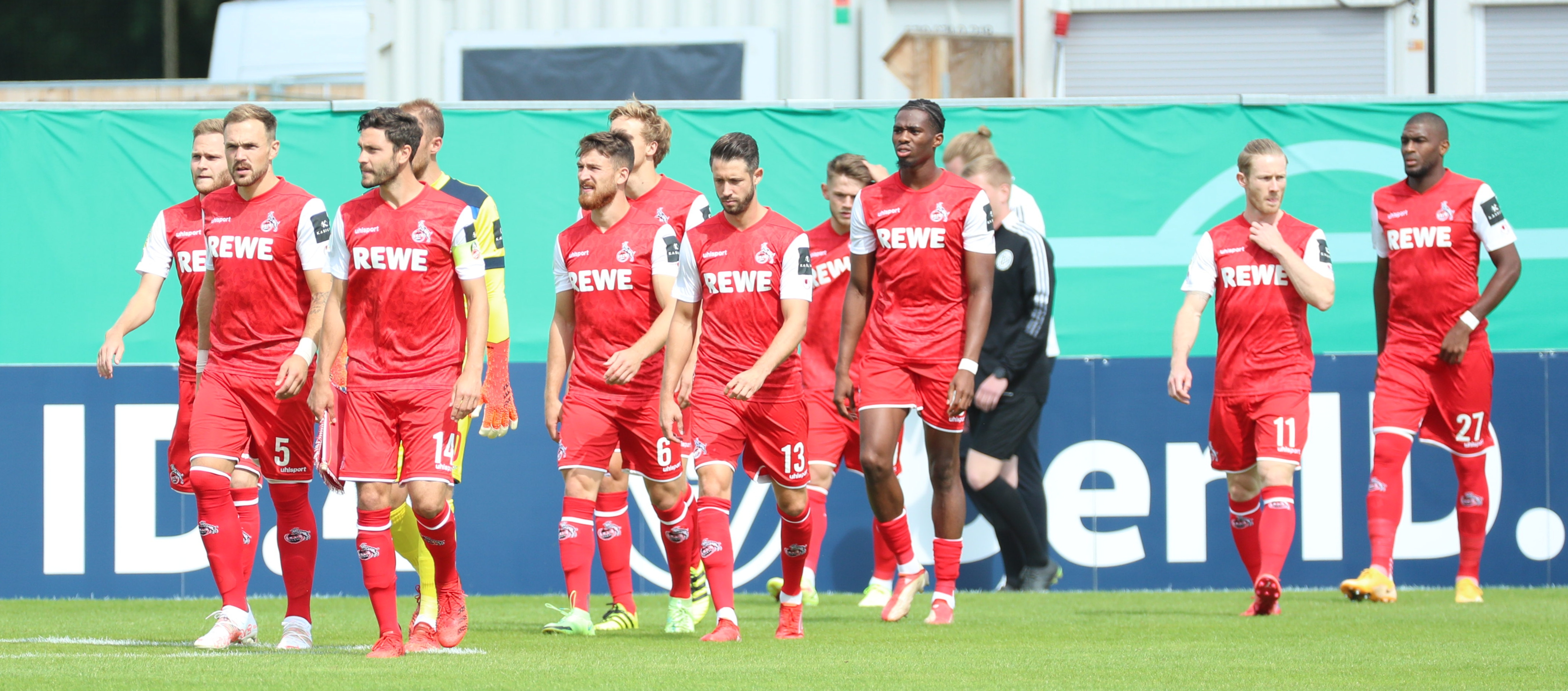
1. FC Köln in 2021

Ahead of the 2018–19 season, Markus Anfang was appointed manager. While the club occupied the league's top spot for much of the season, Anfang was dismissed after a winless streak in April 2019. Only a week later, with André Pawlak having taken over as Anfang's successor, the team achieved promotion as champions at first attempt with a 4–0 victory over Greuther Fürth. Following an unsuccessful start to the 2019–20 season, which included a 3–2 cup defeat against 1. FC Saarbrücken, the club decided to terminate Achim Beierlorzer's contract on 9 November 2019. Sporting director Armin Veh, who weeks earlier had announced that he would not extend his contract with the club, was also dismissed from his position. On 18 November, former HSV manager Markus Gisdol was appointed to the club's head coaching position, while Horst Heldt was made sporting director. Under Gisdol, the team avoided relegation at the end of the season.

During the majority of the 2020–21 season, Köln was involved in a relegation battle and occupied one of the bottom three places in the division. On 11 April 2021, after losing to relegation rival Mainz 05, Gisdol was dismissed from his position as head coach. The next day, the club presented Friedhelm Funkel as an interim coach who would take over head coaching duties until the end of the season. Funkel's side faced Holstein Kiel in the relegation playoffs. After losing 1–0 at home, his team recorded a 5–1 away win, enabling the club to retain its position in the Bundesliga.

In March 2023, during the second half of the 2022–23 campaign, Köln were put under a two-window transfer embargo by FIFA's Dispute Resolution Chamber, having been found guilty of inducing a breach of contract without just cause while signing Jaka Čuber Potočnik from Olimpija Ljubljana in January 2022. As part of the same verdict, the club was also sentenced to pay Ljubljana a €51,750 compensation, in addition to training costs. Köln appealed the decision at the Court of Arbitration for Sport in Lausanne, which affirmed the embargo imposed by FIFA.

In the 2023–24 Bundesliga season, Köln were relegated to the 2. Bundesliga after finishing second bottom on the table, but they immediately returned to Bundesliga in the next season as champions of 2. Bundesliga.

During the 2025-26 Bundesliga season, their first season back in the Bundesliga, Köln finished 14th.

== Stadium ==
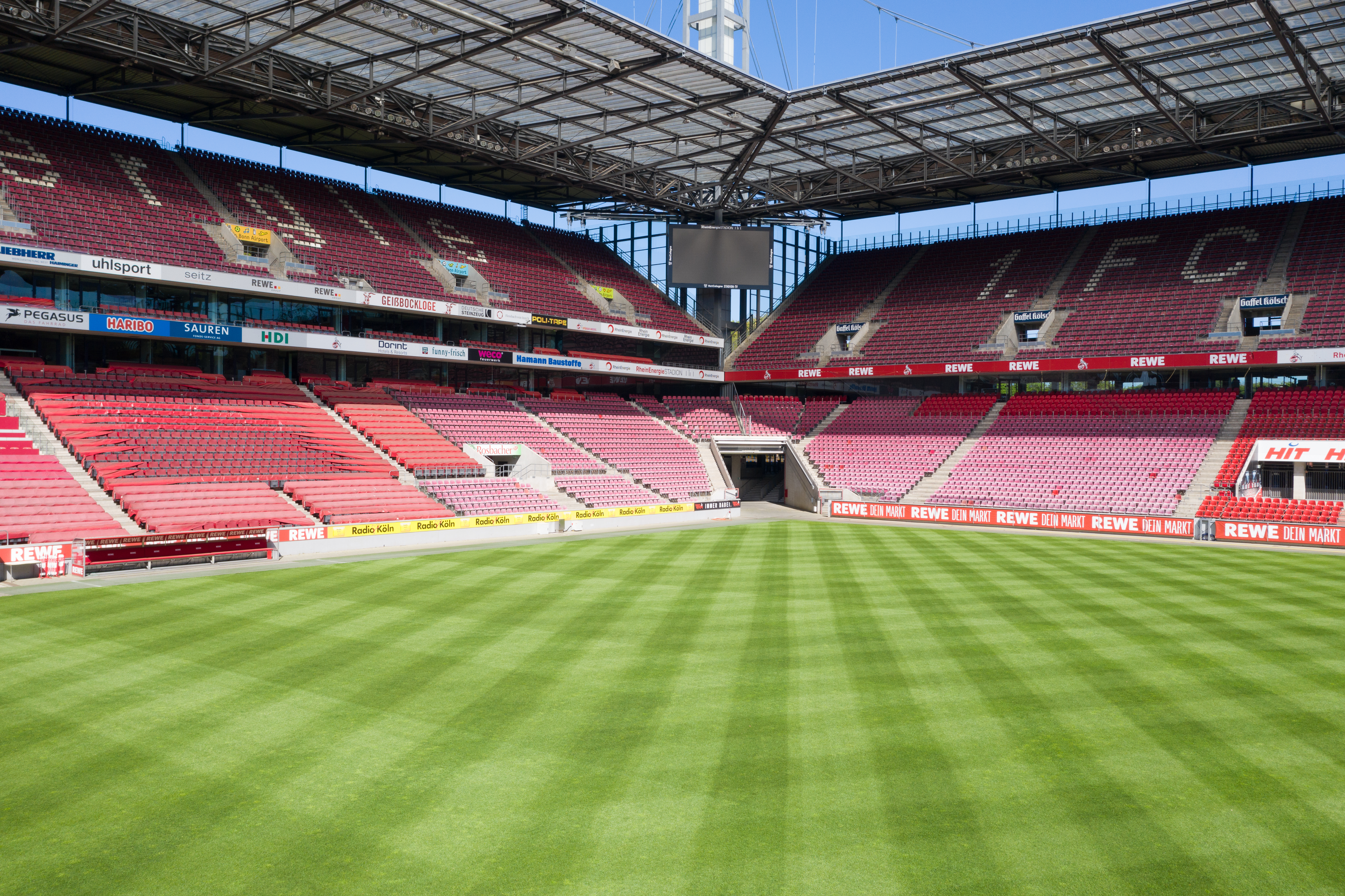
RheinEnergieStadion

The team plays its home matches in the Müngersdorfer Stadion, also known as the RheinEnergie Stadion for sponsorship purposes. It has a capacity of around 50,000 and had an average attendance of 48,676 in the 2015–16 season. The stadium sponsorship comes from a contract with the local power supplier RheinEnergie AG. However, most fans still call the stadium "Müngersdorfer Stadion", named after the suburb of Müngersdorf, where it is located.

The club owns the Geißbockheim training centre, known as RheinEnergieSportpark for sponsorship, located in Sülz, which is a municipal part of Köln in the southwest of the city. The centre is home to the Franz-Kremer-Stadion the home of 1. FC Köln II.

== Honours ==
=== Domestic ===
- German football championship/Bundesliga
  - Champions: 1961–62, 1963–64, 1977–78
  - Runners-up: 1959–60, 1962–63, 1964–65, 1972–73, 1981–82, 1988–89, 1989–90
- DFB-Pokal
  - Winners: 1967–68, 1976–77, 1977–78, 1982–83
  - Runners-up: 1953–54, 1969–70, 1970–71, 1972–73, 1979–80, 1990–91
- 2. Bundesliga
  - Winners: 1999–2000, 2004–05, 2013–14, 2018–19, 2024–25
  - Runners-up: 2002–03

=== International ===
- Easter Cup
  - Winners: 1956
- UEFA Cup
  - Runners-up: 1985–86
- Uhrencup
  - Winners: 1991

=== Regional ===
- Oberliga West
  - Winners: 1953–54, 1959–60, 1960–61, 1961–62, 1962–63
  - Runners-up: 1952–53, 1957–58, 1958–59

=== Doubles ===
- 1977–78: Bundesliga and DFB-Pokal

=== Reserve team ===
- German amateur champions: 1981

=== Youth ===
- German Under 19 championship
  - Champions: 1970–71, 2024–25
  - Runners-up: 1973–74, 1982–83, 1991–92
- Under 19 Bundesliga Division West
  - Champions: 2007–08
  - Runners-up: 2003–04, 2009–10,2013–14, 2014–15
- Under 19 Juniors DFB-Pokal
  - Champions: 2012–13
  - Runners-up: 1990–91, 1993–94
- German Under 17 championship
  - Champions: 1989–90, 2010–11, 2018–19
- Under 17 Bundesliga Division West
  - Champions: 2010–11, 2011–12, 2018–19
  - Runners-up: 2008–09

== Kits ==
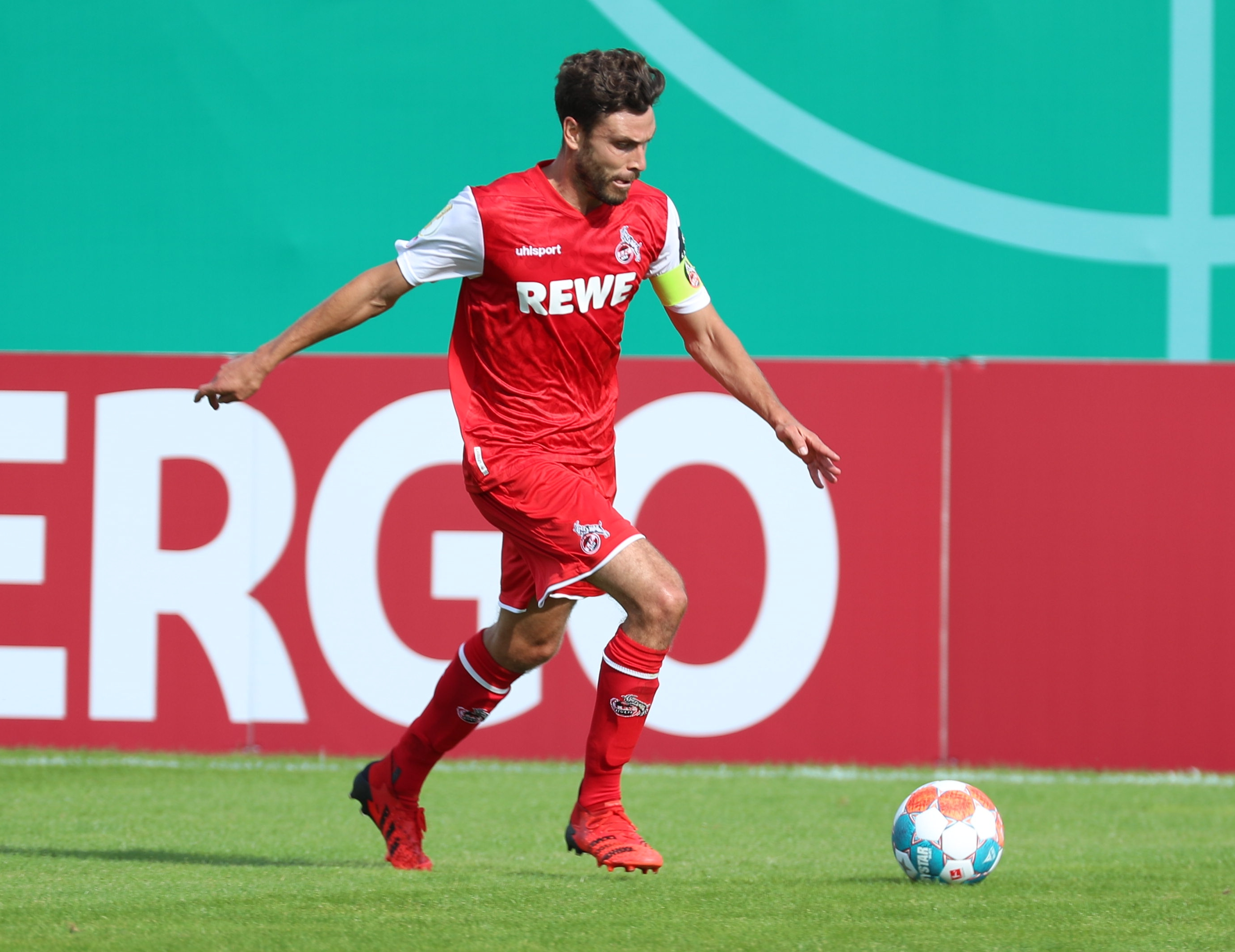
Kit used in 2021–22 season featuring Jonas Hector

Köln's kits are made by Hummel International, who pay the club €20m over a five-year span.

Years	Kit manufacturer	Shirt sponsor
1979–82	Adidas	Pioneer
1982–85	Adidas	Doppel Dusch
1985–88	Puma	Daimon
1988–91	Puma	Samsung
1991–93	Puma	Citibank
1993–94	Puma	Pepsi
1994–99	Puma	Ford
1999–01	Puma	VPV Versicherungen
2001–03	Saller	VPV Versicherungen
2003–05	Saller	Funny-Frisch
2005–07	Adidas	Gerling
2007–08	Adidas	REWE Group
2008–12	Reebok	REWE Group
2012–18	Erima	REWE Group
2018–22	Uhlsport	REWE Group
2022–26	Hummel	REWE Group
2026-	Adidas	REWE Group

== Rivals ==
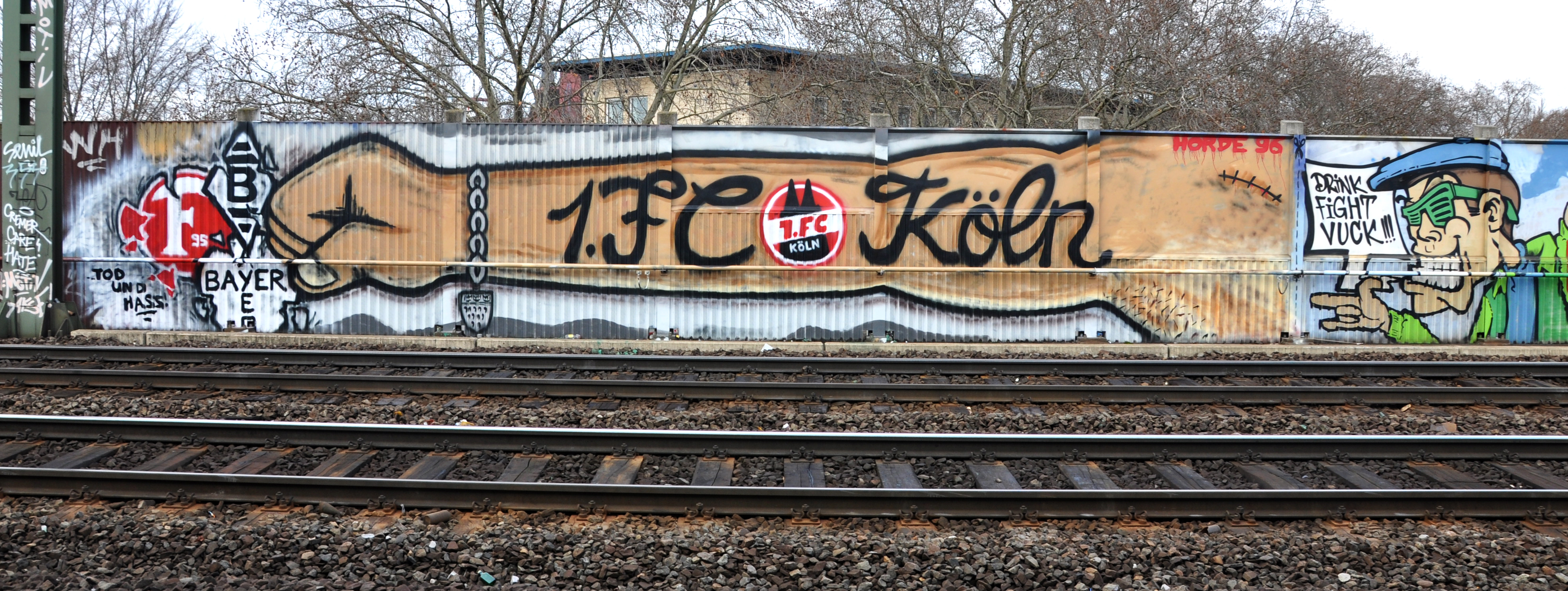
Graffiti in Cologne referencing the badges of 1. FC Köln's three primary rivals

The club's longest-standing and fiercest rivalry is with Borussia Mönchengladbach, against whom they contest the Rhine derby. Although Mönchengladbach is not located along the Rhine, both clubs are based in the Rhineland cultural region. Köln also has rivalries with two other Rhineland-based clubs: Fortuna Düsseldorf and Bayer Leverkusen.

== Players ==
=== Current squad ===
As of 2 September 2026

Note: Flags indicate national team as defined under FIFA eligibility rules; some limited exceptions apply. Players may hold more than one non-FIFA nationality.

No.	Pos.	Nation	Player
1	GK	GER	Marvin Schwäbe (captain)
2	DF	SUI	Joël Schmied
3	DF	CRO	Borna Sosa (on loan from Crystal Palace)
4	DF	GER	Timo Hübers
5	MF	GER	Tom Krauß
6	MF	TUN	Ellyes Skhiri
7	FW	GER	Luca Waldschmidt
8	MF	ISL	Ísak Jóhannesson
9	FW	GER	Ragnar Ache
10	MF	GER	Said El Mala
11	FW	ENG	Reigan Heskey
14	DF	GHA	Gideon Mensah
15	FW	BIH	Imad Rondić
17	MF	BEL	Alessio Castro-Montes
19	FW	GER	Malek El Mala
20	GK	GER	Ron-Robert Zieler

No.	Pos.	Nation	Player
21	GK	FRA	Martin James
22	DF	ENG	Jahmai Simpson-Pusey
23	MF	AUS	Paul Okon-Engstler
24	DF	GEO	Luka Lochoshvili
27	FW	NED	Thijs Dallinga (on loan from Bologna)
28	DF	NOR	Sebastian Sebulonsen
29	MF	GER	Jan Thielmann
30	FW	GER	Marius Bülter
31	MF	POR	Gil Neves
33	DF	NED	Rav van den Berg
34	MF	GER	Fayssal Harchaoui
37	MF	GER	Linton Maina
44	GK	GER	Matthias Köbbing
47	FW	ENG	Mikey Moore (on loan from Tottenham Hotspur)
49	MF	GER	David Fürst

=== Players out on loan ===
Note: Flags indicate national team as defined under FIFA eligibility rules; some limited exceptions apply. Players may hold more than one non-FIFA nationality.

No.	Pos.	Nation	Player
—	DF	COD	Elias Bakatukanda (at VfL Osnabrück until 30 June 2027)
—	DF	BIH	Jusuf Gazibegović (at Widzew Łódź until 30 June 2027)
—	DF	GER	Julian Pauli (at OB until 30 June 2027)
—	MF	EST	Patrik Kristal (at Thun until 30 June 2027)

No.	Pos.	Nation	Player
—	FW	SLO	Jaka Čuber Potočnik (at Rot-Weiss Essen until 30 June 2027)
—	FW	GER	Youssoupha Niang (at St. Pauli until 30 June 2027)
—	FW	GER	Fynn Schenten (at Roda JC until 30 June 2027)

== Coaching staff ==
As of 22 March 2026

Head coach	(Germany) René Wagner
Assistant coach	(Germany) Armin Reutershahn (Germany) Lukas Sinkiewicz (Germany) Hannes Dold
Goalkeeper coach	(Germany) Peter Greiber
Athletics coach	(Germany) Max Weuthen (Germany) Leif Frach (Germany) Tillmann Bockhorst (Germany) Niko Romm
Match analyst	(Germany) Denis Huckestein (Germany) Felix Handke
Managing director sport	(Germany) Thomas Kessler
Technical director	(Germany) Lukas Berg
Director of staff planning & recruiting	(Germany) Tim Steidten
Team manager	(Germany) Marius Laux
Equipment manager	(Germany) Frank Almstedt (Croatia) Krešimir Ban
Bus driver	(Germany) Michael Liebetrut
Head of physiotherapy and rehabilitation	(Germany) Christian Osebold
Physiotherapist	(Germany) Marvin Kreuzwieser (Germany) Daniel Schütz
Osteopath	(Germany) Matti Forkel
Team doctor	(Germany) Dr. Peter Schäferhoff (Germany) Dr. Paul Klein (Germany) Dr. Bettina Kuper

== Head coaches since 1963 ==
Head coach	From	To	League Record				
Head coach	From	To	M	W	D	L	Win %
Georg Knöpfle	1 July 1963	30 June 1966	115	59	34	22	51.30
Willi Multhaup	1 July 1966	30 June 1968	79	37	17	25	46.84
Hans Merkle	1 July 1968	30 June 1970	78	38	11	29	48.72
Ernst Ocwirk	1 July 1970	30 June 1971	44	19	11	14	43.18
Gyula Lóránt	1 July 1971	4 April 1972	31	14	10	7	45.16
Rolf Herings	5 April 1972	30 June 1972	11	6	3	2	54.55
Rudi Schlott	1 July 1972	16 September 1973	55	24	17	14	43.64
Zlatko Čajkovski	17 September 1973	12 December 1975	92	47	18	27	51.09
Georg Stollenwerk	1 January 1976	30 June 1976	20	9	6	5	45.00
Hennes Weisweiler	1 July 1976	15 April 1980	165	90	36	39	54.55
Karl-Heinz Heddergott	16 April 1980	13 October 1980	19	7	5	7	36.84
Rolf Herings	13 October 1980	18 October 1980	1	0	0	1	0.00
Rinus Michels	18 October 1980	21 August 1983	108	53	26	29	49.07
Hannes Löhr	22 August 1983	6 February 1986	97	45	18	34	46.39
Georg Kessler	7 February 1986	22 September 1986	24	7	4	13	29.17
Christoph Daum	23 September 1986	28 June 1990	154	78	43	33	50.65
Erich Rutemöller	1 July 1990	30 August 1991	54	21	20	13	38.89
Udo Lattek	30 August 1991	4 September 1991	1	0	1	0	0.00
Johannes Linßen	4 September 1991	11 September 1991	1	0	0	1	0.00
Jörg Berger	11 September 1991	28 February 1993	53	21	14	18	39.62
Wolfgang Jerat	28 February 1993	29 April 1993	9	3	1	5	33.33
Morten Olsen	29 April 1993	27 August 1995	89	35	23	31	39.33
Stephan Engels	27 August 1995	31 March 1996	23	4	11	8	17.39
Peter Neururer	1 April 1996	30 September 1997	60	25	8	27	41.67
Lorenz-Günther Köstner	1 October 1997	30 June 1998	26	8	5	13	30.77
Bernd Schuster	1 July 1998	30 June 1999	35	12	9	14	34.29
Ewald Lienen	1 July 1999	28 January 2002	94	38	24	32	40.43
Christoph John	28 January 2002	13 February 2002	4	1	0	3	25.00
Friedhelm Funkel	14 February 2002	30 October 2003	63	29	15	19	46.03
Marcel Koller	2 November 2003	14 June 2004	24	4	5	15	16.67
Huub Stevens	14 June 2004	27 May 2005	36	21	8	7	58.33
Uwe Rapolder	1 July 2005	18 December 2005	18	3	3	12	16.67
Hanspeter Latour	3 January 2006	10 November 2006	30	10	9	11	33.33
Holger Gehrke	10 November 2006	26 November 2006	3	1	1	1	33.33
Christoph Daum	26 November 2006	2 June 2009	90	36	19	35	40.00
Zvonimir Soldo	1 July 2009	24 October 2010	48	14	13	21	29.17
Frank Schaefer	24 October 2010	27 April 2011	24	10	3	11	41.67
Volker Finke	27 April 2011	30 June 2011	3	3	0	0	100.00
Ståle Solbakken	1 July 2011	12 April 2012	32	9	5	18	28.13
Frank Schaefer	12 April 2012	30 June 2012	4	0	1	3	0.00
Holger Stanislawski	1 July 2012	19 May 2013	37	16	12	9	43.24
Peter Stöger	11 June 2013	3 December 2017	147	56	51	40	38.10
Stefan Ruthenbeck	3 December 2017	30 June 2018	22	5	4	13	22.73
Markus Anfang	1 July 2018	27 April 2019	31	18	8	5	58.06
Achim Beierlorzer	1 July 2019	9 November 2019	11	2	1	8	18.18
Markus Gisdol	18 November 2019	11 April 2021	51	13	13	25	25.49
Friedhelm Funkel	12 April 2021	30 June 2021	6	3	1	2	50.00
Steffen Baumgart	1 July 2021	21 December 2023	92	30	29	33	32.61
Timo Schultz	4 January 2024	30 June 2024	18	3	8	7	16.67
Gerhard Struber	1 July 2024	5 May 2025	36	19	7	10	52.78
Friedhelm Funkel	5 May 2025	30 June 2025	2	2	0	0	100.00
Lukas Kwasniok	1 July 2025	22 March 2026	29	7	8	14	24.14
René Wagner	22 March 2026	Present	7	1	3	3	14.29

== Women's section ==
The women's team was promoted to the Bundesliga in 2015. They were directly relegated back to the 2. Frauen-Bundesliga after the 2016–17 season ended, but managed to regain promotion in May 2017 to the Bundesliga.
