= Christoph John =

German footballer and manager

Personal information
- Date of birth: 24 December 1958 (age 67)
- Place of birth: Heidenheim an der Brenz, West Germany

Senior career*
Years	Team	Apps	(Gls)
- Heidenheimer SB
- 1. FC Köln II

Managerial career
- 1998–2007: 1. FC Köln II
- 2002: → 1. FC Köln (caretaker)
- 2007–2008: 1. FC Köln (scout)
- 2008: Wuppertaler SV Borussia
- 2009–2010: Hertha BSC (assistant)
- 2010–2011: VfL Bochum (assistant)
- 2011–2012: Alemannia Aachen (assistant)
- * Club domestic league appearances and goals

Christoph John (born 24 December 1958) is a German football manager and former player.
