= Hildegard of Bingen Gymnasium =

- Hildegard-von-Bingen-Gymnasium
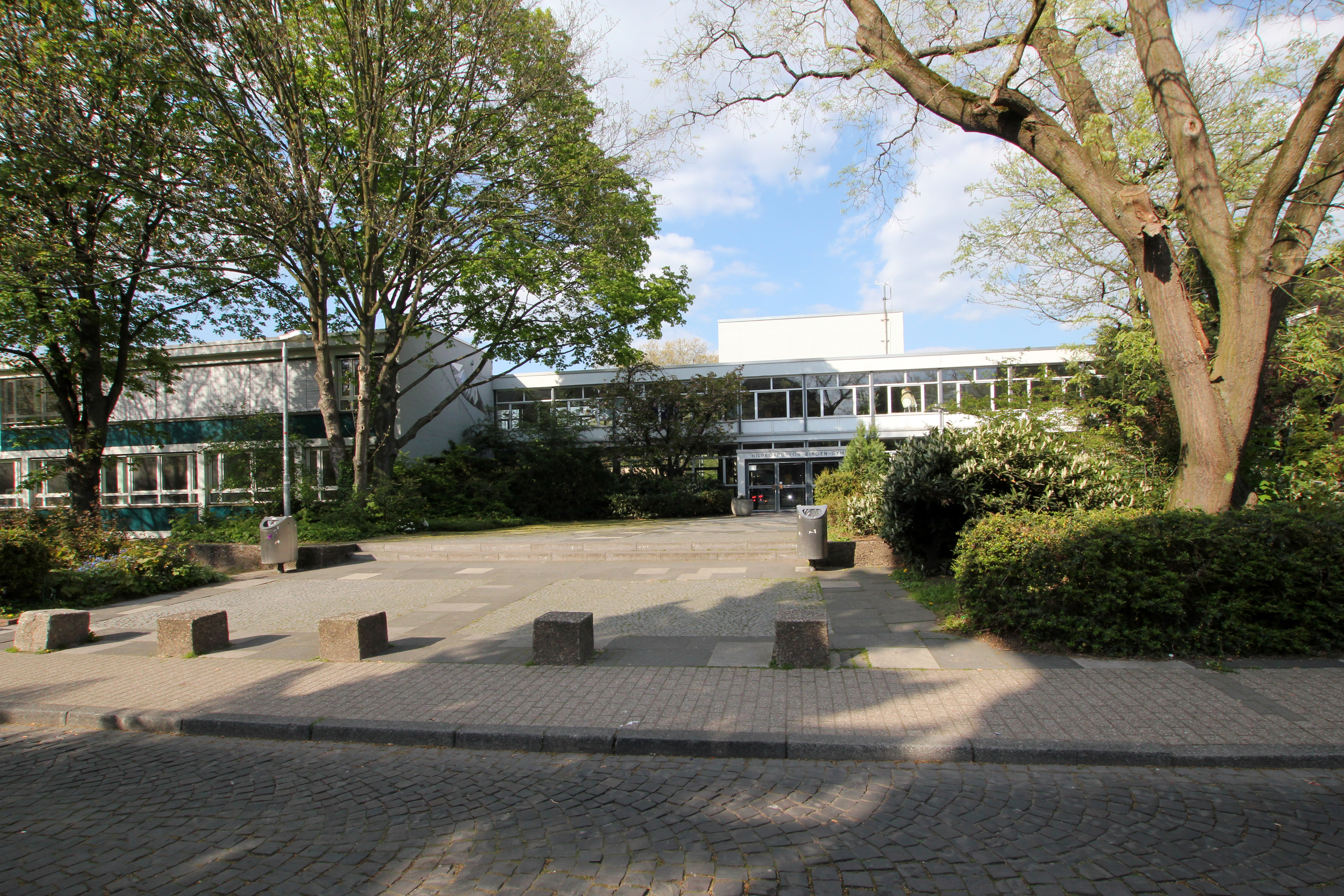

Location
- Sülz, Cologne, North Rhine-Westphalia; Germany; 50°55′0.1″N 6°55′59.4″E

Information
- Established: 1888
- Website: hvb-gymnasium.de

The Hildegard of Bingen Gymnasium (Hildegard-von-Bingen-Gymnasium) is a co-ed high school in the district of Sülz, Cologne. It is named after the Benedictine Hildegard of Bingen.
