= Sülzgürtel station =

Railway station in Germany

Sülzgürtel
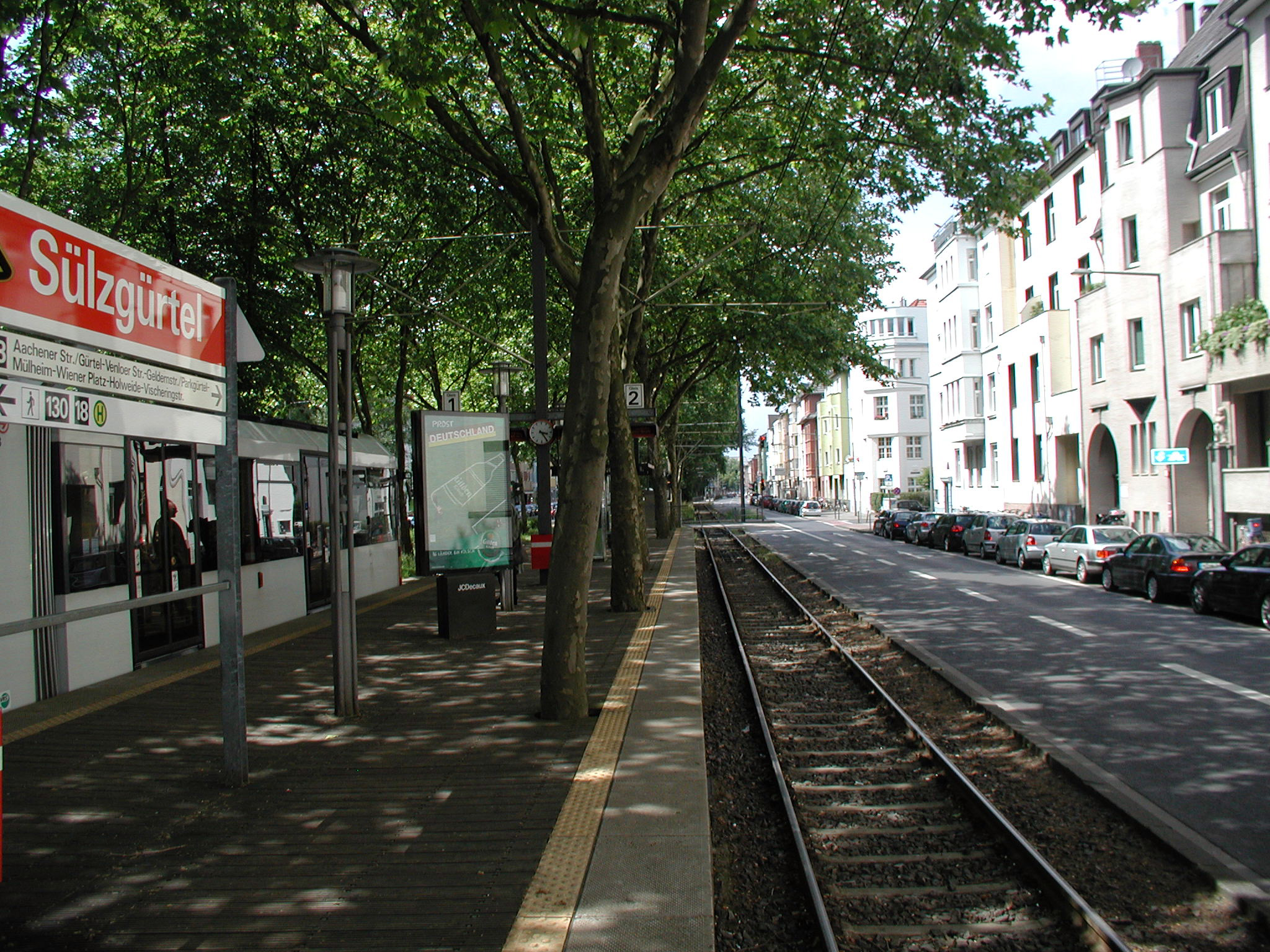
- Sülzgürtel station

General information
- Location: Sülzgürtel, 50937 Köln
- Coordinates: 50°54′45″N 6°55′25″E
- Owner: Kölner Verkehrs-Betriebe
- Platforms: 2 bay platforms
- Connections: Bus, Taxi

Construction
- Structure type: At grade
- Accessible: Yes

Other information
- Fare zone: VRS: 2100

History
- Opened: 20 January 1898

Services
Preceding station	Cologne Stadtbahn	Following station
Terminus	Line 13	Berrenrather Straße/Gürtel towards Holweide Vischeringstraße
Klettenbergpark towards Bonn Hbf	Line 18	Sülzburgstraße towards Thielenbruch
Route map
Location

Sülzgürtel is a terminus and interchange station on the Cologne Stadtbahn lines 13 and 18 in Cologne. The station lies at the junction of Luxemburger Straße and Sülzgürtel, Sülz in the district of Lindenthal.

The station was opened on 20 January 1898 and today consists of two bay platforms with together four rail tracks, whose connection at the junction is not used for regular service. The platform for line 13 is in the middle of Sülzgürtel north of Luxemburger Straße, while the platform for line 18 is in the middle of Luxemburger Straße, to the west of Sülzgürtel.

With the planned extension of line 13, the tracks along Sülzgürtel will be extended across Luxemburger Straße, and line 13 will get a new terminus further along the Gürtel. A partially tunneled extension is also in discussion, which could lead to Sülzgürtel being replaced by a new underground station.

== See also ==
- List of Cologne KVB stations
