= Roland Koch (footballer) =

German football coach (born 1952)

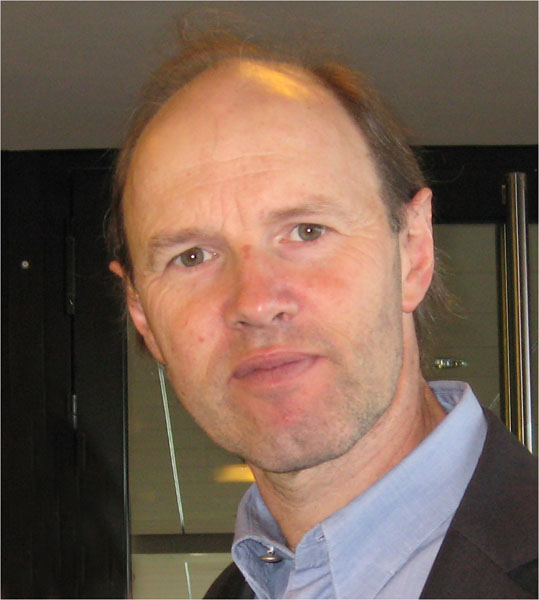
- Koch in 2007

Personal information
- Full name: Roland Bernhard Koch
- Date of birth: 28 October 1952 (age 74)
- Place of birth: Osnabrück, Germany

Team information
- Current team: Viktoria Köln (head of youth)

Senior career*
Years	Team	Apps	(Gls)
- SV Meppen
- BC Berrenrath

Managerial career
- 1981–1990: 1. FC Köln (assistant)
- 1990: VfL Osnabrück
- 1990–1994: VfB Stuttgart (assistant)
- 1994–1996: Beşiktaş (assistant)
- 1996: Beşiktaş
- 1996–2001: Bayer Leverkusen (assistant)
- 2001–2002: Beşiktaş (assistant)
- 2002: Esteghlal
- 2002–2003: Austria Wien (assistant)
- 2003–2006: Fenerbahçe (assistant)
- 2006–2009: 1. FC Köln (assistant)
- 2009–2010: Fenerbahçe (assistant)
- 2011: Eintracht Frankfurt (assistant)
- 2011–2013: Beşiktaş (assistant)
- 2011: Beşiktaş
- 2013–2014: Kayseri Erciyesspor (assistant)
- 2014–2016: Çaykur Rizespor (assistant)
- 2016–2017: FC Wil (sporting director)
- 2016: FC Wil (caretaker)
- 2017–: Viktoria Köln (head of youth)
- 2017: Viktoria Köln (caretaker)
- * Club domestic league appearances and goals

Roland Bernhard Koch (born 28 October 1952) is a German football coach.

== Career ==
Born in Osnabrück, Roland Koch played for SV Meppen and BC Berrenrath. After finishing his career as a player, he began working in 1981 as amateur coach with 1. FC Köln. In the 1986–87 season he was promoted to assistant coach of Christoph Daum. He worked with Christoph Daum as an assistant manager for several years. In the 2002–03 season Koch signed for Iranian club Esteghlal F.C. as a manager. At the start of the 2003–04 season he began again as assistant manager of Christoph Daum for Fenerbahçe S.K.
