= Stephan Engels =

German footballer and manager

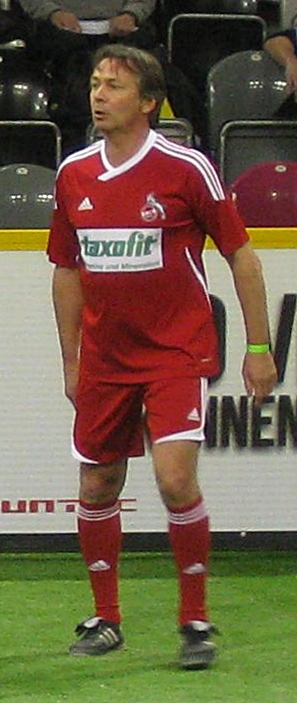
- Engels in December 2011

Personal information
- Full name: Stephan Engels
- Date of birth: 6 September 1960 (age 66)
- Place of birth: Niederkassel, West Germany
- Height: 1.78 m (5 ft 10 in)
- Position: Midfielder

Youth career
- 1968–1976: TuS Mondorf
- 1976–1978: 1. FC Köln

Senior career*
Years	Team	Apps	(Gls)
1978–1988	1. FC Köln	236	(39)
1988–1990	Fortuna Köln	16	(7)
Total		252	(46)

International career
1982–1983	West Germany	8	(0)

Managerial career
- 1995–1996: 1. FC Köln
- 2004–2005: SCB Viktoria Köln
- * Club domestic league appearances and goals

Stephan Engels (born 6 September 1960) is a German former professional football player and manager, who played as a midfielder.

In the West German top-flight he scored 39 goals in 236 matches. In 1982-83 Engels won the West German Cup with 1. FC Köln.

After retiring he worked as coach for 1. FC Köln (1995–1996) and SCB Viktoria Köln (2004–2005). In April 2009 he became youth coordinator for 1. FC Köln.

He was a member of the West Germany in the early 1980s. He won 8 caps for West Germany between 1982 and 1983, but did not make an appearance during the 1982 FIFA World Cup.
