= Steffen Baumgart =

German football manager (born 1972)

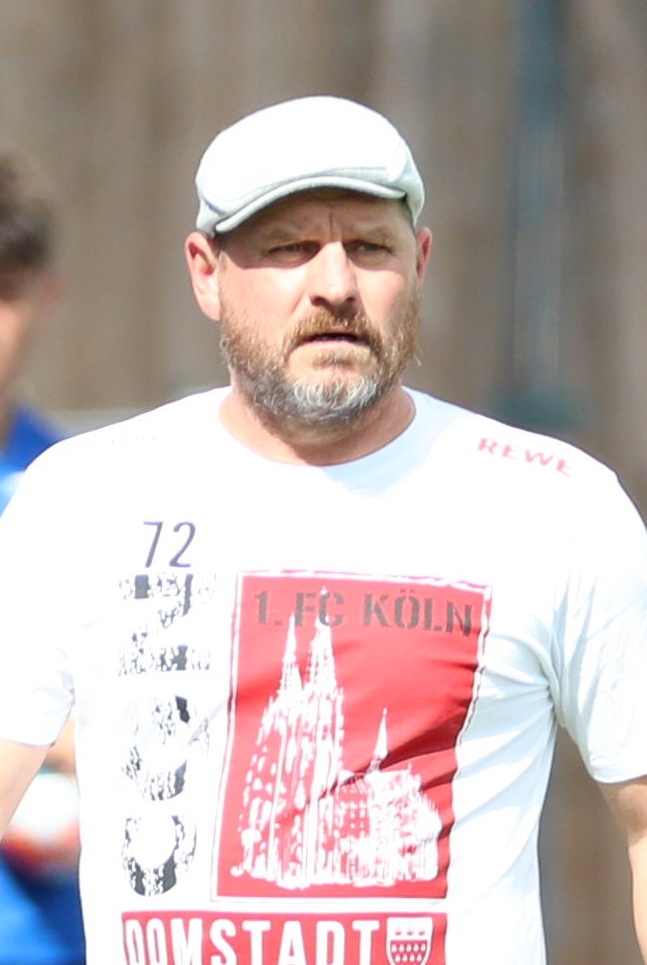
- Baumgart in 2021

Personal information
- Date of birth: 5 January 1972 (age 54)
- Place of birth: Rostock, East Germany
- Height: 1.78 m (5 ft 10 in)
- Position: Forward

Youth career
- 1980–1988: Dynamo Rostock-Mitte

Senior career*
Years	Team	Apps	(Gls)
1988–1991	PSV Schwerin	58	(19)
1991–1994	SpVg Aurich	92	(51)
1994–1998	Hansa Rostock	118	(26)
1998–1999	VfL Wolfsburg	32	(5)
1999–2002	Hansa Rostock	67	(6)
2002–2004	Union Berlin	64	(22)
2004–2008	Energie Cottbus	76	(6)
2008	1. FC Magdeburg	13	(3)
2008–2009	Germania Schöneiche	15	(3)
Total		535	(141)

Managerial career
- 2009–2010: 1. FC Magdeburg
- 2014–2015: Köpenick-Oberspree
- 2015–2016: Berliner AK 07
- 2017–2021: SC Paderborn
- 2021–2023: 1. FC Köln
- 2024: Hamburger SV
- 2025–2026: Union Berlin
- * Club domestic league appearances and goals

Steffen Baumgart (born 5 January 1972) is a German professional football manager and former player who was most recently in charge of Bundesliga club Union Berlin.

== Playing career ==
A forward, Baumgart began his professional career at Hansa Rostock in 1995. With a two-year interruption he spent six years with FC Hansa, scoring 32 goals in 185 appearances. In 2002, he moved to Union Berlin, spending two years at Stadion An der Alten Försterei where he became a crowd favourite. In 2004, the club was relegated from 2. Bundesliga, finishing only 17th.

However, Baumgart stayed in the league, moving to Energie Cottbus on a free transfer. There he helped secure the 2. Bundesliga in his first season and won promotion to Bundesliga in 2006. Cottbus managed to not be relegated in their first season in the top flight in Germany, but the next season saw Baumgart hardly playing for the first team, and on 3 January 2008 club and player agreed to a mutual termination of the contract. On 22 January, Regionalliga Nord side 1. FC Magdeburg announced Baumgart had signed a contract until June 2008 with an option for another season. After the club missed out on qualifying to the new 3. Liga, Baumgart's contract was not extended and he left the club for Germania Schöneiche, a club near Berlin.

Baumgart scored 29 goals in 225 Bundesliga matches and 36 goals in 142 matches in the 2. Bundesliga.

== Managerial career ==
On 31 March 2009, he returned to 1. FC Magdeburg as a manager and signed a contract running until the end of the season. His contract was extended at the end of the season, despite a mediocre record in the league. Baumgart had won the FSA-Pokal in 2009, but he was unable to improve upon the results of his predecessor. On the contrary, Magdeburg were ten points behind a promotion spot by the end of December. Following a string of bad results when league play resumed in 2010, Baumgart was let go at the end of March.

In 2017, Baumgart signed with SC Paderborn. Having been saved narrowly the previous year, the club surprisingly finished second in the 2017-18 season and returned to the 2. Bundesliga. In 2019, in a remarkable turn of events, the newly promoted side managed another top-two finish, which returned Paderborn to the Bundesliga after years of turbulence. The 2019–20 season, however, saw the club struggle against Bundesliga competition. Paderborn finished the season in last place with 20 points, which led to their relegation back to the second tier in June 2020. Baumgart's contract at Paderborn was dated until 30 June 2021. In April 2021, it was announced that Baumgart will not extend his contract, and he left the club at the end of the season.

On 11 May 2021, Bundesliga club 1. FC Köln announced that they will appoint Baumgart as manager for the 2021–22 season on a two-year contract. His first game in charge was a preseason friendly against Bundesliga champions Bayern Munich, which Baumgart's side won 3–2. Baumgart and FC mutually parted ways in December 2023 after the club scored ten points in 16 games. On 20 February 2024, he was appointed by Hamburger SV. On 24 November 2024, he was sacked.

In December 2024, he was named the new head coach of Union Berlin. He was sacked in April 2026.

== Trivia ==
In 2021, Baumgart received the award "Bester Fußballspruch des Jahres" (Best football saying of the year) awarded by the German Academy for Football Culture for his saying: "Ein Spiel ist erst vorbei, wenn der Schiedsrichter pfeift und ich nicht mehr brülle." ("A game isn't over until the referee whistles and I stop yelling.")

== Managerial statistics ==
As of match played 11 April 2026

Managerial record by team and tenure
Team	From	To	Record								Ref
Team	From	To	G	W	D	L	GF	GA	GD	Win %	Ref
1. FC Magdeburg	31 March 2009	23 March 2010	34	13	9	12	59	44	+15	38.24	
Berliner AK 07	1 July 2015	31 August 2016	41	25	11	5	74	28	+46	60.98	
SC Paderborn	16 April 2017	30 June 2021	166	76	39	51	324	230	+94	45.78	
1. FC Köln	1 July 2021	31 December 2023	98	31	31	36	134	149	−15	31.63	
Hamburger SV	20 February 2024	24 November 2024	27	12	7	8	55	33	+22	44.44	
Union Berlin	2 January 2025	11 April 2026	51	16	14	21	64	85	−21	31.37	
Total			417	173	111	133	710	569	+141	41.49	—
