= Sülz =

Municipal part of Cologne, Germany

Coordinates: 50°55′3″N 6°55′27″E

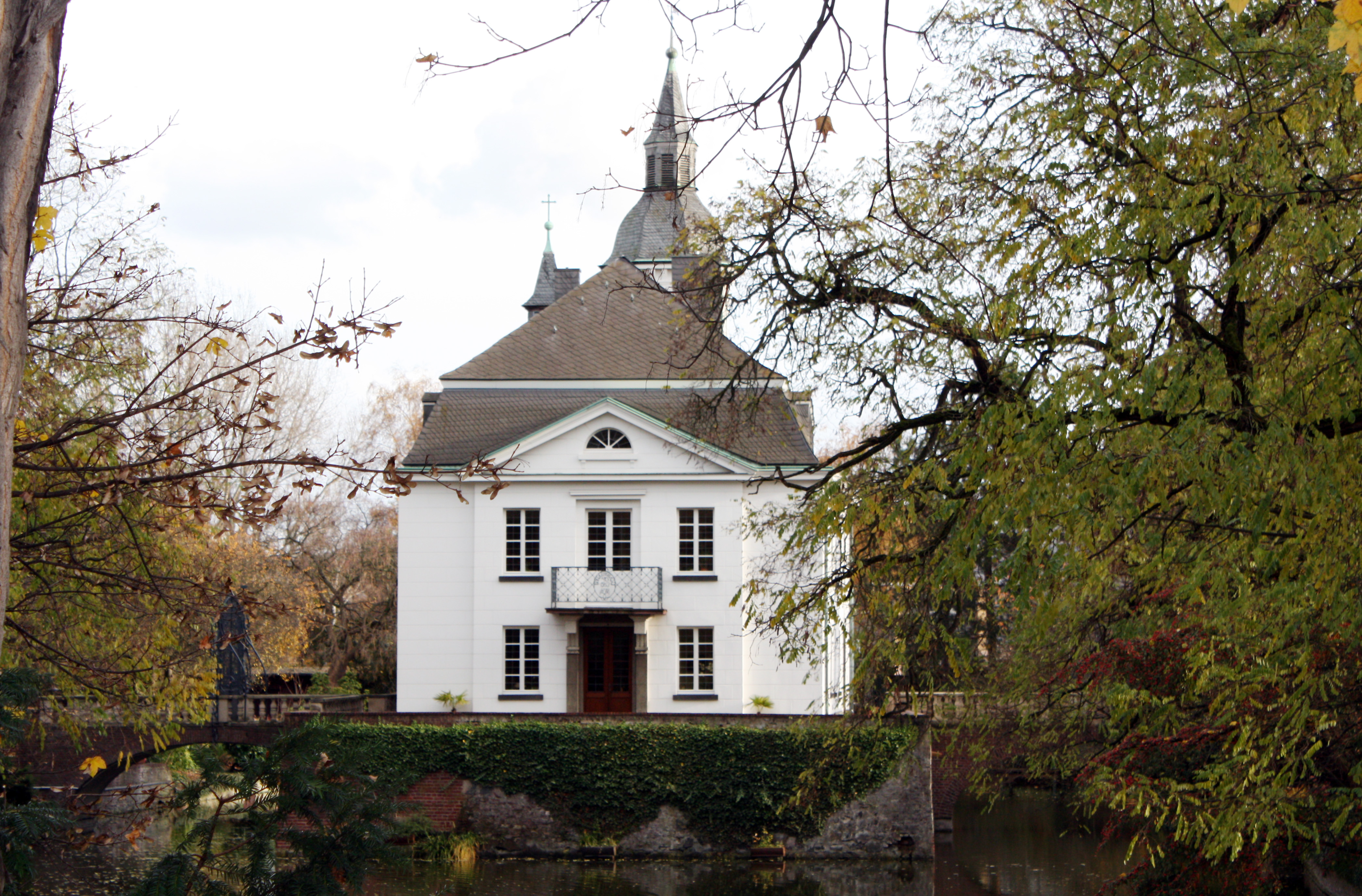
Weißhaus near Luxemburger Straße

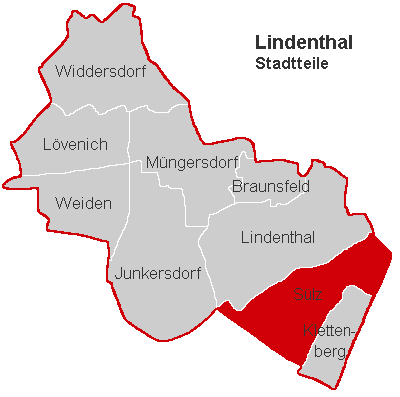
Map of Sülz (shown in red) within the district of Lindenthal

Sülz (German pronunciation: [ˈzʏlts]; Kölsch: Sölz [zǿlts]) is a municipal part of Cologne, Germany and part of the district of Lindenthal. Sülz lies on Luxemburger Straße between Lindenthal and Klettenberg. Sülz has 35.475 inhabitants (as of 31 December 2008) and covers an area of 5,17 km^{2} (pop. density 6.862 inhabitants/km^{2}).

The name Sülz goes back to Sulpece, first mentioned in 1145 as a possession of the Church of St. Pantaleon. The 12th century Weißhaus (white house) is a water castle and the oldest building in Sülz. The district is served by Cologne Stadtbahn lines 9 along its North-West, 18 in its South-East and 13 crossing them in the South of Sülz. It hosts some of the eastmost premises of the University, just at and outside the edge of main campus.

== Education ==
Gemeinschaftsgrundschule Manderscheider Platz is located in Sülz. In the same street, few blocks closer to the center, there is the katholische Grundschule Berrenrather Straße and three blocks West of it the Grundschule St. Boromäus.

The Japanische Schule Köln e.V. (ケルン日本語補習授業校 Kerun Nihongo Hoshū Jugyō Kō), a Japanese weekend school, previously held its classes at the GGS Manderscheider Platz. It began holding classes in Kalk as of 20 August 2009.

Some parts of the University of Cologne are located in Sülz.

== Transport links ==
Sülz lightrail station

Sülz is the end of line 9 of Cologne Stadtbahn coming from Königsforst.
