= Lindenthal, Cologne =

Lindenthal
- Borough of Cologne
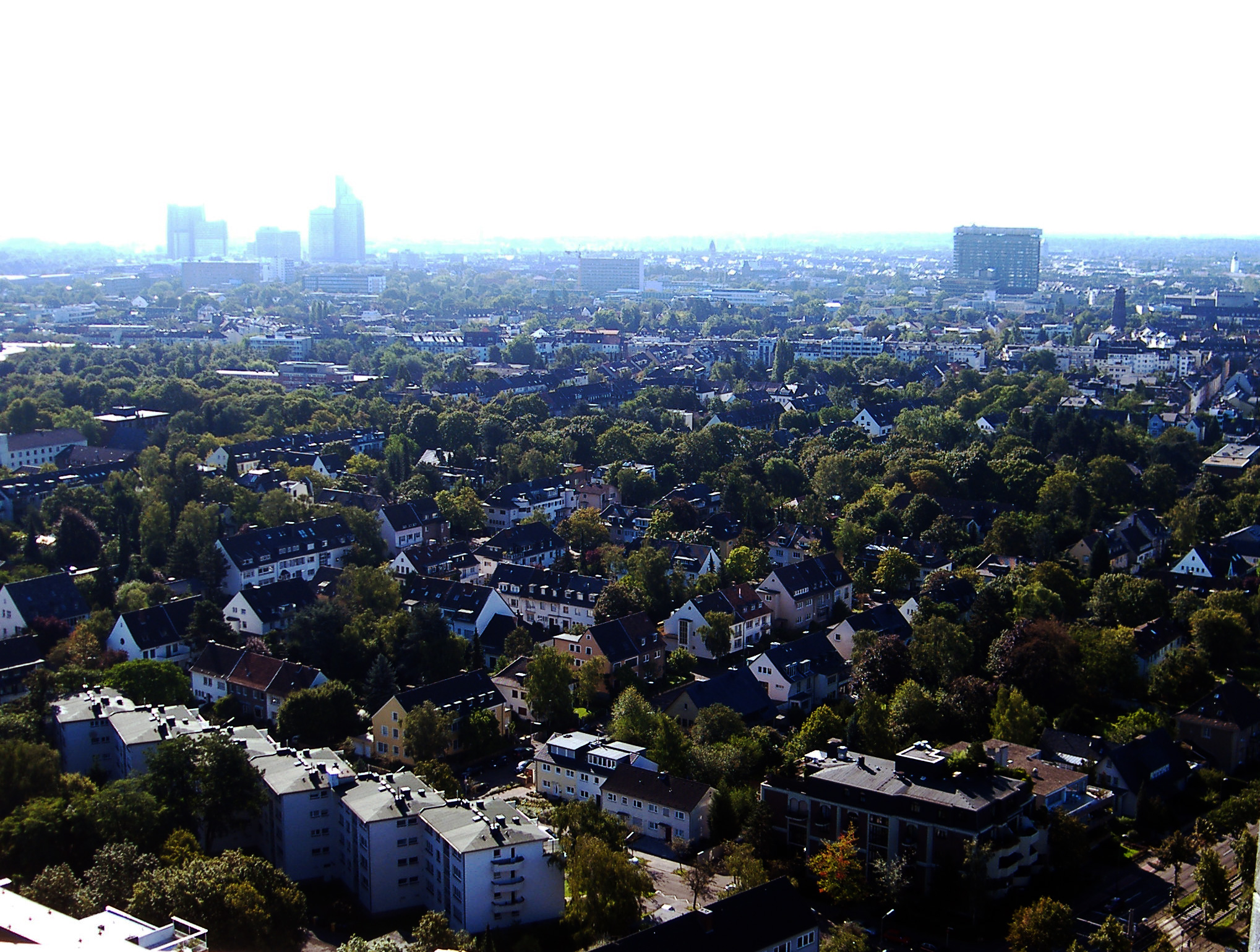
- Aerial view

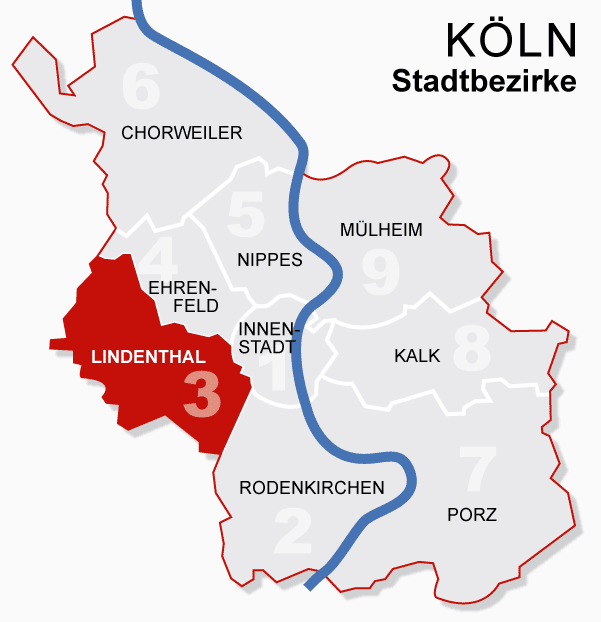
- Location within Cologne
- Interactive map of Lindenthal
- Location within Germany Location within North Rhine-Westphalia
- Coordinates: 50°55′34″N 6°54′36″E
- Country: Germany
- State: North Rhine-Westphalia
- Admin. region: Cologne
- District: Urban district
- City: Cologne

Area
  - Total: 41.80 km^{2} (16.14 sq mi)

Population (2020-12-31)
  - Total: 152,286
  - Density: 3,643/km^{2} (9,436/sq mi)
- Time zone: UTC+01:00 (CET)
  - Summer (DST): UTC+02:00 (CEST)

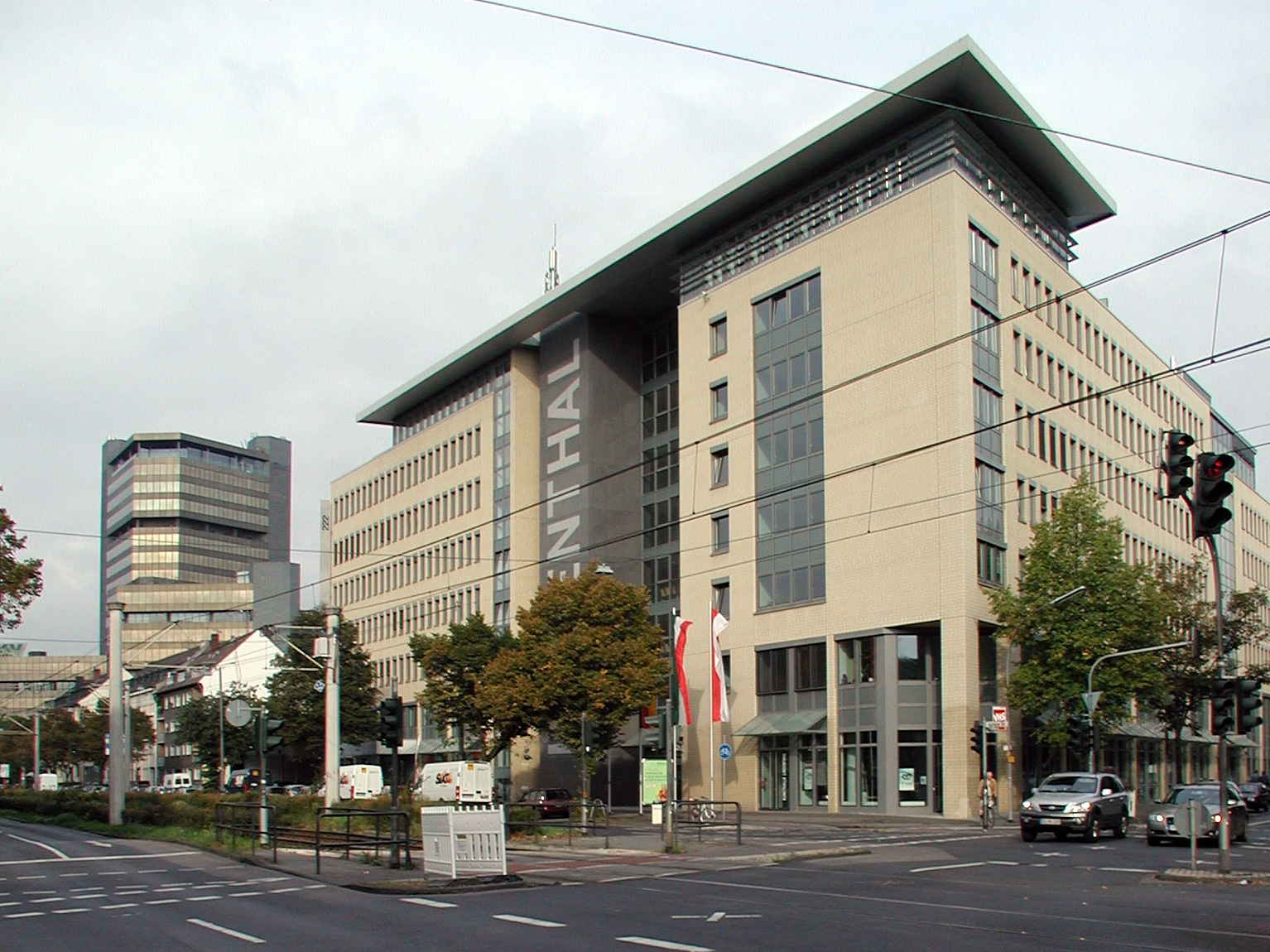
District town hall

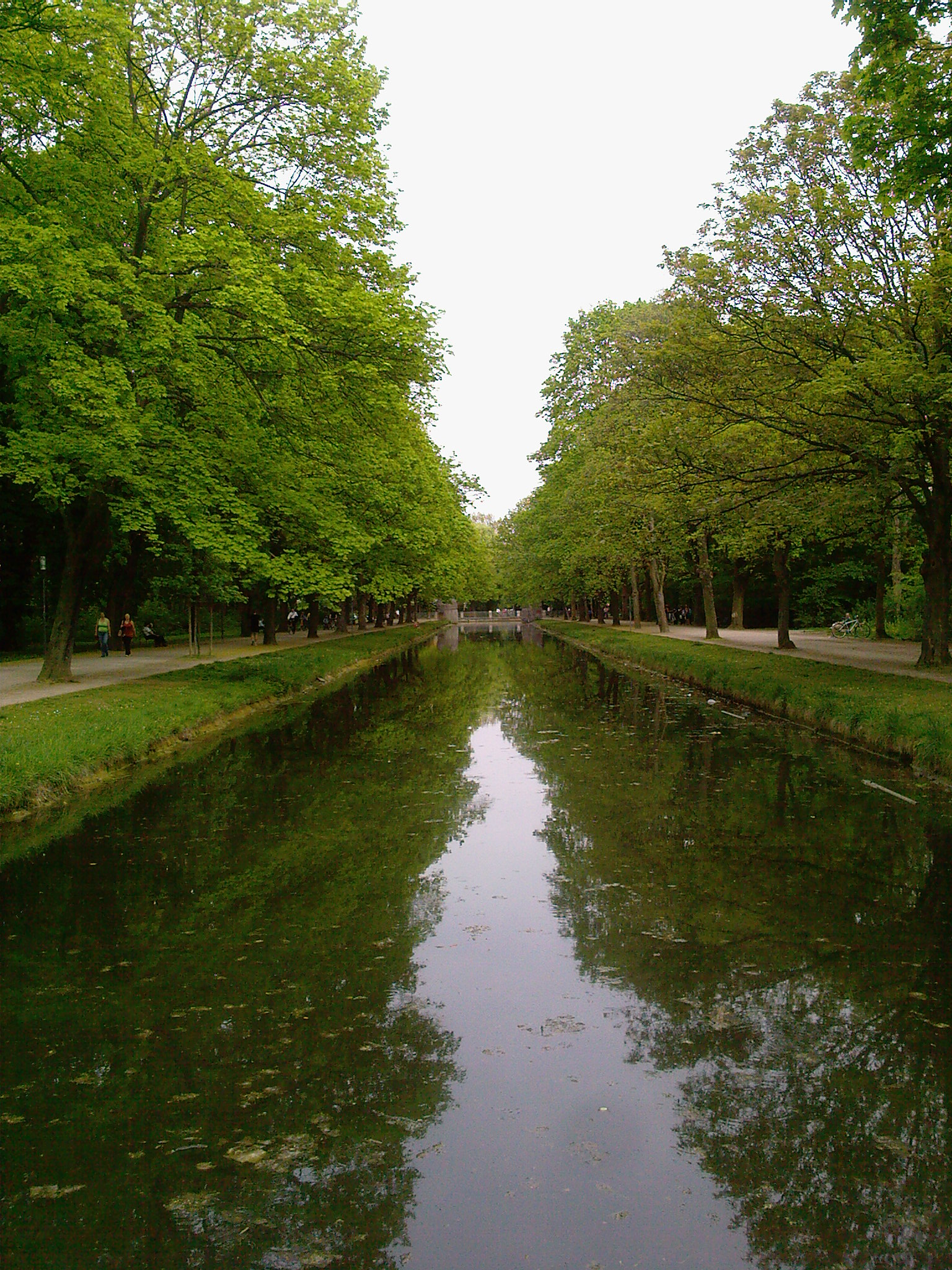
Rautenstrauchstraße canal near the University's Institute for Biology

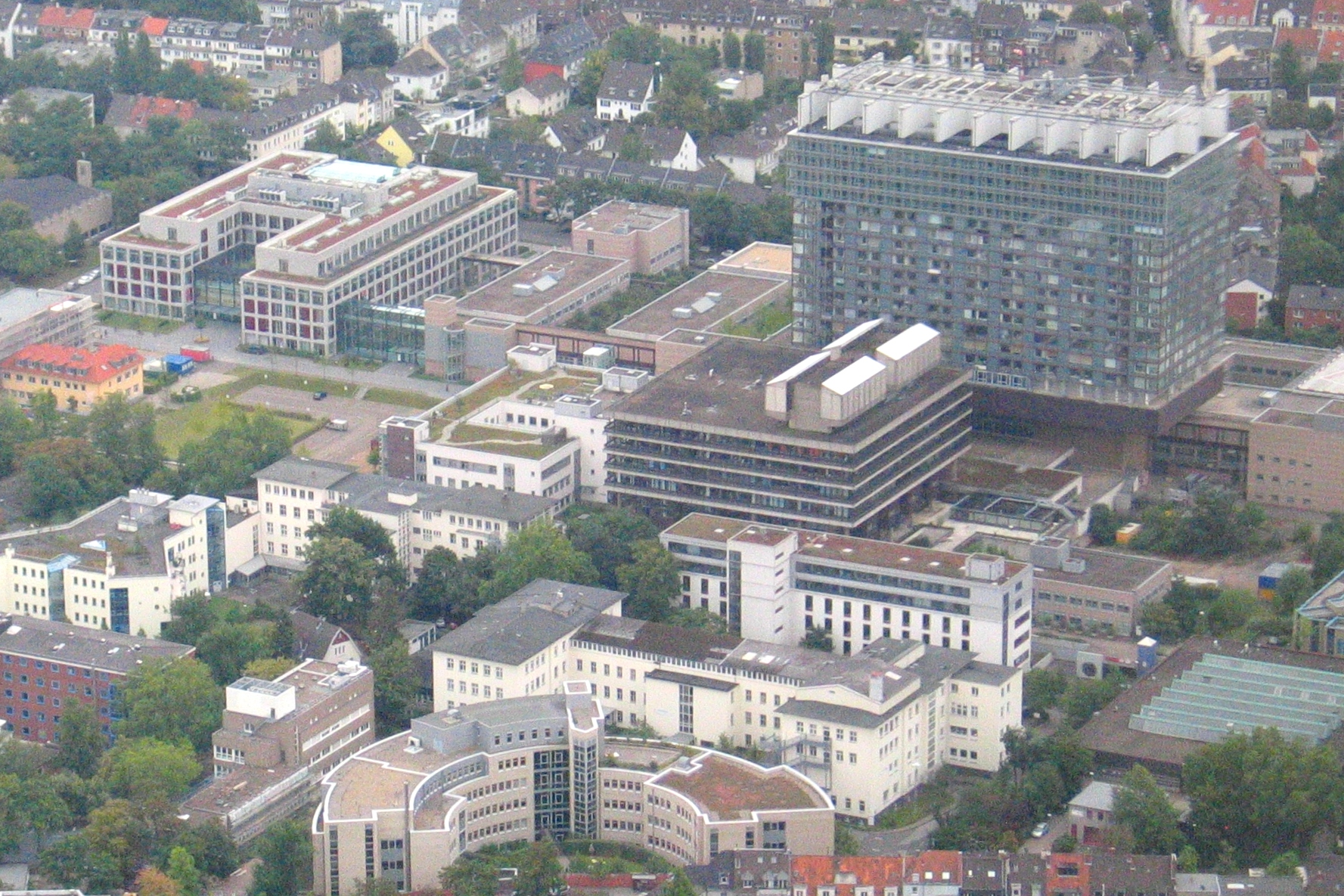
Campus of the Cologne University Hospital

Lindenthal (German: Köln-Lindenthal [ˈkœln ˈlɪndn̩ˌtaːl]; Kölsch: Lendethal [ˈlêndəˌtaːl]) is a borough of the City of Cologne in Germany. It includes the quarters Braunsfeld, Junkersdorf, Klettenberg, Lindenthal, Lövenich, Müngersdorf, Sülz, Weiden and Widdersdorf. It has about 153,000 inhabitants (as of December 2019) and covers an area of 41.8 square kilometers.

Many parts of Lindenthal are dominated by academic and research campuses, primarily linked to the University of Cologne and the German Sport University. The latter has a campus at Sportpark Müngersdorf, next to RheinEnergieStadion and the European College of Sport Science.

The Cologne University Hospital has a vast campus around the Kerpener Straße. Other institutions include the Max Planck Institutes for Biology of Ageing and Plant Breeding Research.

Cologne's Melaten-Friedhof is located on Aachener Straße.

== History ==
During the Cold War, the headquarters of the I Belgian Corps was located in Junkersdorf.

== Subdivisions ==
Lindenthal consists of nine Stadtteile (city quarters, in local dialect Veedel):

#	City part	Population (2019)	Area (km^{2})	Pop. per km^{2}	map
301	Klettenberg	10,679	1,80	5,942	District map of Lindenthal
302	Sülz	36,432	5,17	7,102	District map of Lindenthal
303	Lindenthal	30,685	7,73	3,970	District map of Lindenthal
304	Braunsfeld	12,312	1,68	7,342	District map of Lindenthal
305	Müngersdorf	8,833	5,10	1,733	District map of Lindenthal
306	Junkersdorf	15,263	7,38	2,069	District map of Lindenthal
307	Weiden	17,478	3,65	4,782	District map of Lindenthal
308	Lövenich	9,205	3,69	2,493	District map of Lindenthal
309	Widdersdorf	12,413	5,60	2,217	District map of Lindenthal
Source: Kölner Stadtteilinformationen Einwohnerzahlen 2019 (in German)

== Transportation ==
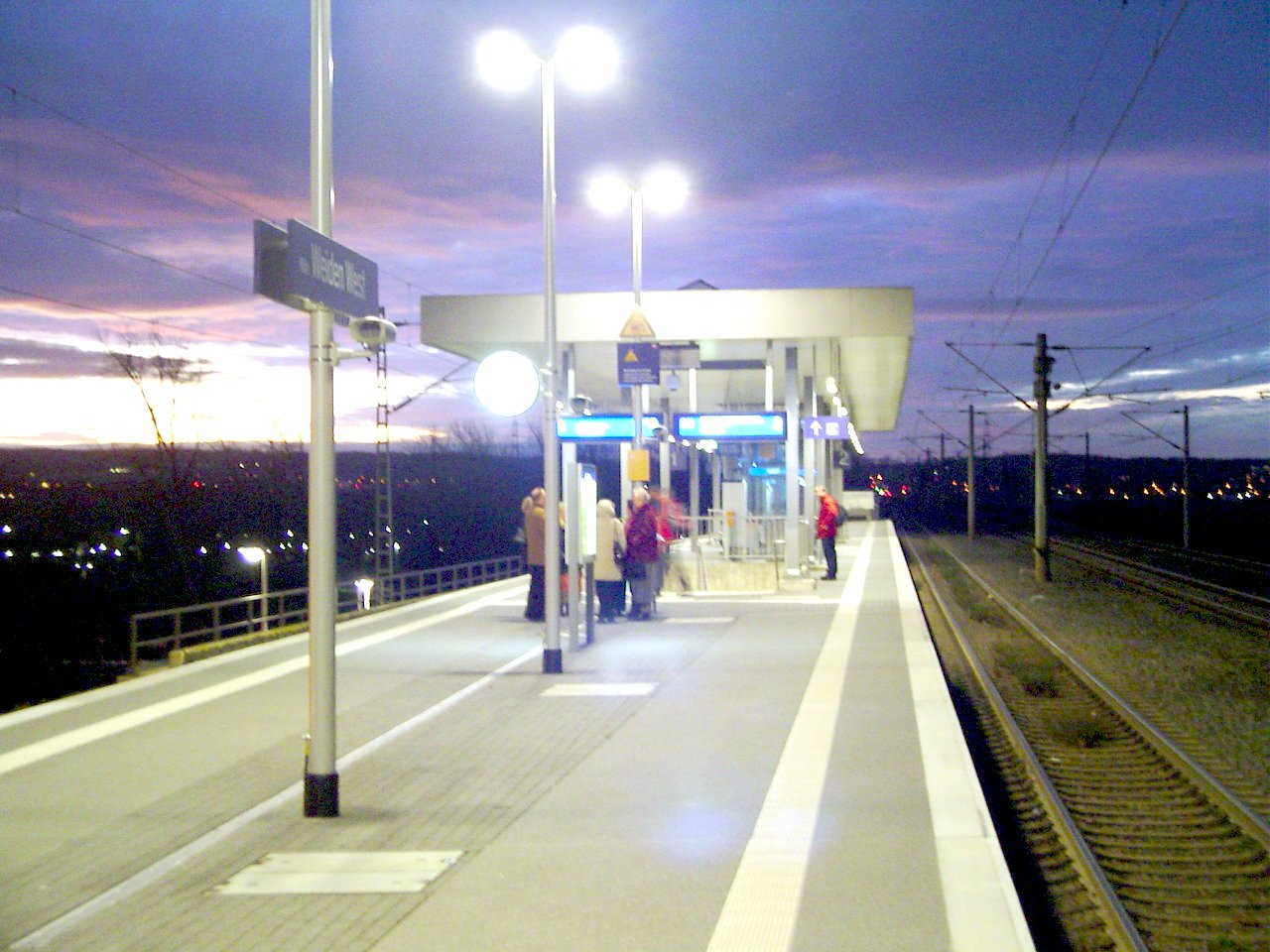
Weiden West stop

Lindenthal is served by numerous railway stations and highway. Train station include Köln-Lövenich, Köln-Müngersdorf/Technologiepark and Köln-Weiden West, as well as numerous light rail stations of Cologne Stadtbahn lines 1, 7, 9, 13 and 18. Aachener Straße and Luxemburger Straße connect Lindenthal with the Cologne Ring and Cologne Beltway.

== Twin towns – sister cities ==
Lindenthal is "twinned" with the following cities:

- Benfleet, United Kingdom
- Diepenbeek, Belgium
- Igny, France
