= Franz Ludwig von Bibra =

German settler in Tasmania, Australia (1783–1823)

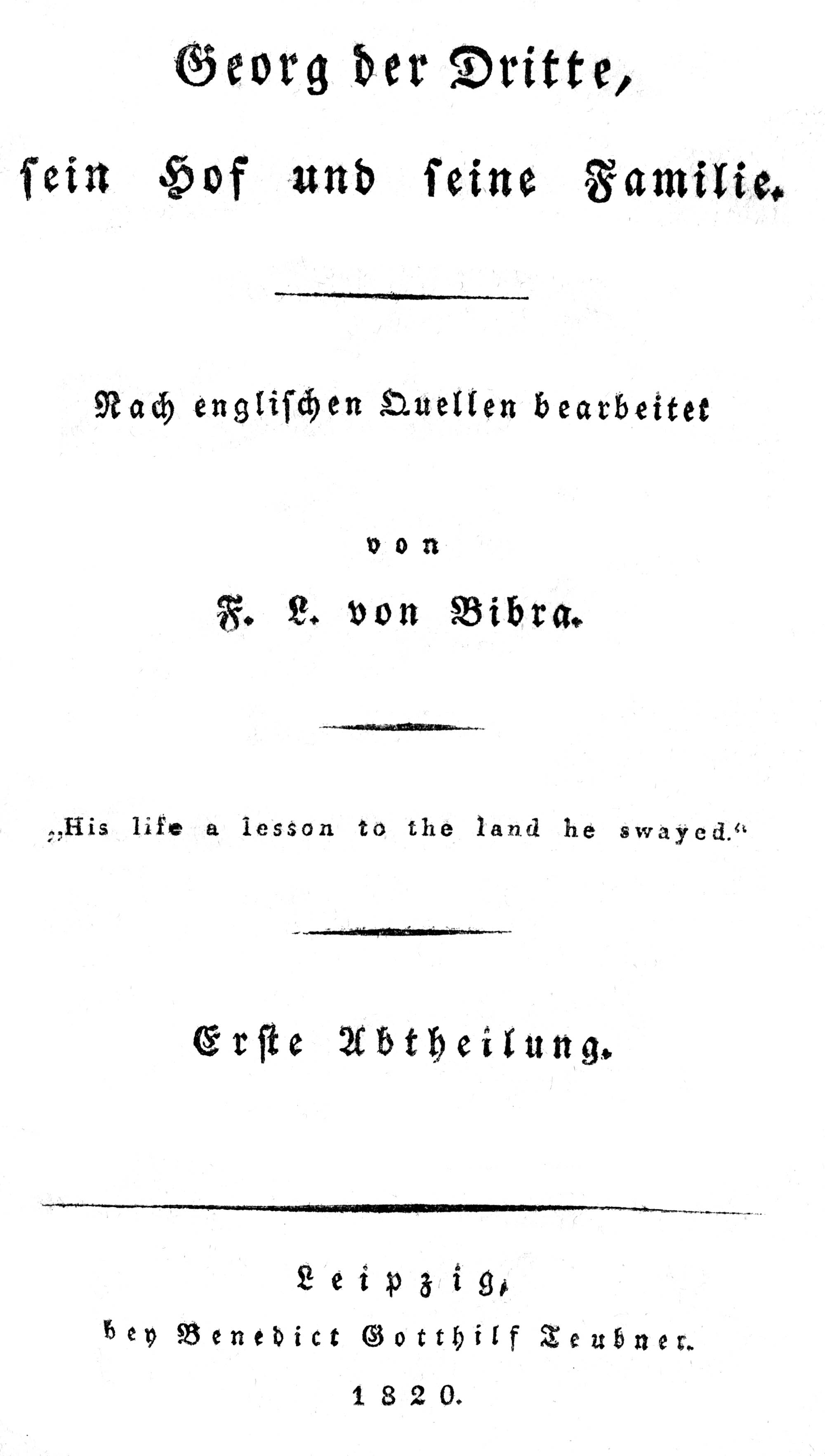
Cover page of Franz Ludwig von Bibra's biography of George III

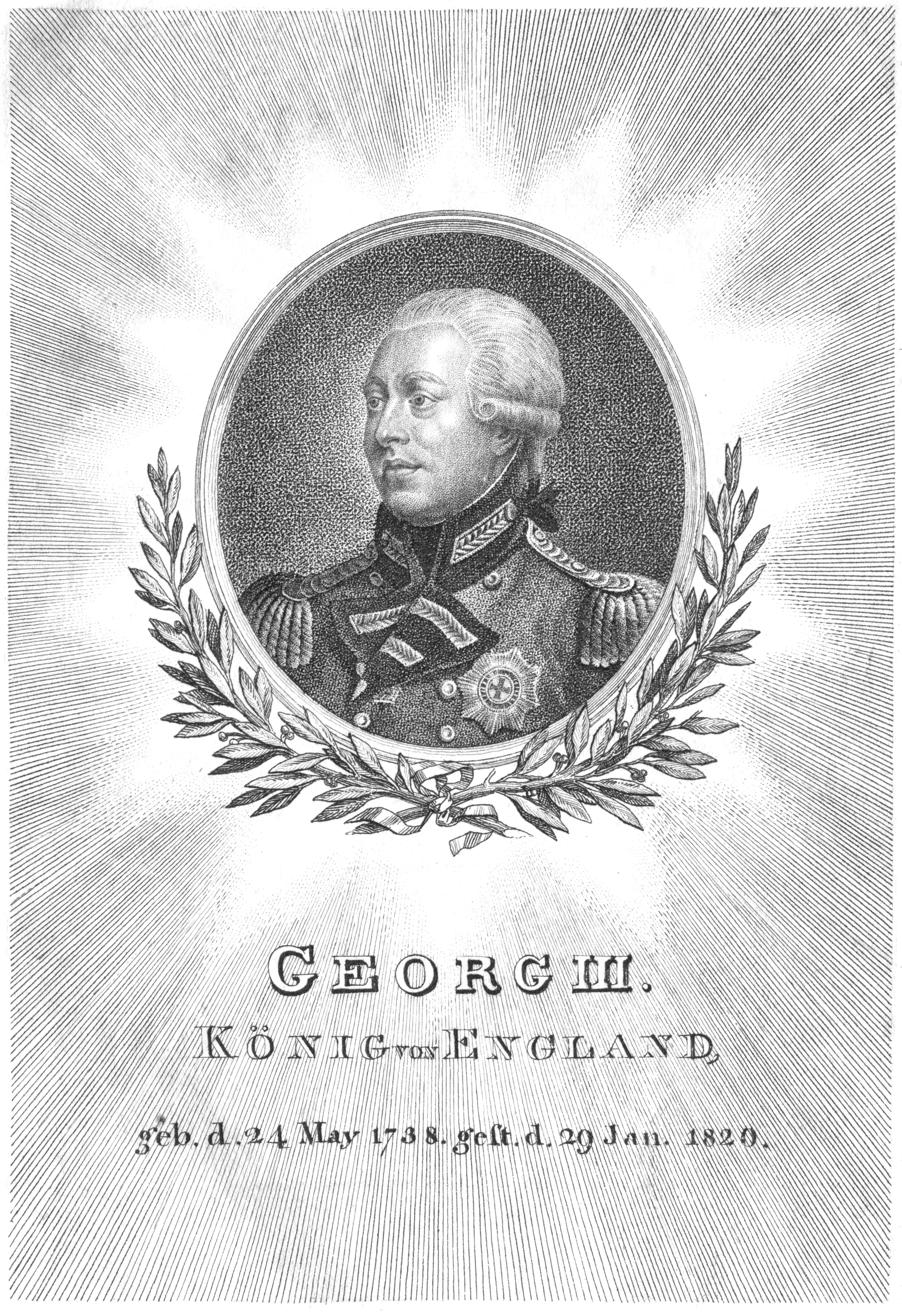
Portrait of George III from FL von Bibra biography

Franz Ludwig Freiherr (Baron) von Bibra, Sr. (10 February 1783 – 14 September 1823) was a soldier, author, and early settler of Tasmania, Australia.

== Life ==
Joined the Prussian Army, becoming a second lieutenant in 1801. Resigned commission in 1804 and two years later enlisted in the British army where his older brother Adam Friedrich Heinrich also served. After a brief visit to Germany in 1806, Franz Ludwig joined the Royal Corsican Rangers where he would eventually serve in the Mediterranean Sea. The regiment was disbanded in 1816 and Franz Ludwig considered moving his family to Van Diemen's Land (Tasmania), Australia. In order to investigate the viability of Van Diemen's Land he took a position on a ship traveling to Van Diemen's Land . He spent over a year exploring and gathering information. When he returned to England in 1817, he gathered more information on Van Diemen's Land. He asked Dr. Carl N. Röding to help compile the material into a book which was published in 1823. (See link below) Franz Ludwig returned to Germany and in 1819 took the position in England as tutor to the two youngest daughters of future King William IV of the United Kingdom and his mistress Dorothea Jordan: Augusta and Amelia. He retained this position until 1822. Franz Ludwig's biography of George III was printed in 1820.

After returning to Germany, Franz Ludwig endeavored to emigrate to Van Diemen's Land with his family. Despite not having sufficient funds for the journey, but with letters of recommendation from the future Queen Victoria's mother Princess Victoria of Saxe-Coburg-Saalfeld (Duchess of Kent and Strathearn) and her brother, His Royal Highness (English) Leopold of Saxe-Coburg (later King of Belgium). Franz Leopold and his family sailed 25 September 1822. Arriving in Hobart on 10 January 1823 and persuading the Lieutenant-Governor William Sorell to give a grant of 1000 acres by the Macquarie River and ten assigned servants. Franz Ludwig named the property Coburg after the city near his original home and closely associated with the British royal family. The property near Cressy, Tasmania (41°45′57″S 147°11′10″E) was later incorporated into the Macquarie Estate. Because of his military experience he was named the Chief District Constable.

== Death ==
Franz Ludwig went hunting and did not return. A search party found his body in the flooding Macquarie River on 14 September 1823. The Coroner's Inquest verdict on 16 September was "Found drowned, and suffocated in the Macquarie River" although local gossip speculated that Franz Leopold had drowned himself. With the large family now fatherless and penniless, a public appeal was made which raised £165 (including 5 guineas from Lieutenant-Governor William Sorell). The oldest son was only fourteen at the time of Franz Ludwig's death. The family struggled for the next several years and on 25 January 1830, the widow Eliza sailed back to England with some of the children.

== Author ==
Book on Settling Tasmania Schilderung der Insel Van Diemensland, einer höchst merkwürdigen Brittischen Colonie in der Südsee. Ein Handbuch für die, welche dahin auszuwandern geneigt wären. Based on Franz Ludwig's material and edited by Carl N. Röding. Hamburg 1823, reprinted 2010.

Book on king George III Georg der Dritte, sein hof und seine Families. Nach englischen Quellen bearbeitet von F.L. von Bibra, Leipzig 1820 Three Volumes 507 pages

== von Bibra family ==
Franz Ludwig was a member of the aristocratic Franconian von Bibra family which among its members were Prince-Bishop of Würzburg, Duke in Franconia Lorenz von Bibra. Lorenz' half brother, Wilhelm von Bibra Papal emissary, Conrad von Bibra, Prince-Bishop of Würzburg, Duke in Franconia (1490–1544), Heinrich von Bibra, Prince-Bishop, Prince-Abbot of Fulda (1711–1788) and Ernst von Bibra (1806–1878), naturalist and author.

Franz Ludwig was from the Gleicherwiesen branch of the von Bibra family. Born in Bamberg to Friedrich August Anton Dietrich Freiherr (Baron) von Bibra, he was the fifth of seven sons who reached maturity. Franz Ludwig was married to Elizabeth Reily in 1807 (died 1853). They had nine children, eight of which reached adulthood.

Benedict (1809–1884) - namesake of Bibra Lake in Western Australia
Friedrich Ulysses (1811–1883)
Mary Josephine (Maria) (1813–1867)
Charles (1816–1875)
Franz Ludwig, Jr. (Francis Louis) (1818–1900)
Amalia Caroline Louisa (Emily) (1819–1879)
Wilhelm Carl (1821–1871)
Jane (1822-1828)
Leopold Ernst Samuel (1823–1860)

Franz Ludwig and Elizabeth Riley had at least thirty-four grandchildren through their sons alone. Prior to 2010, all Bibras in Britain, Australia, New Zealand, Africa and India are their descendants with the exception of native Indians.
