= Willershausen (Herleshausen) =

- Ortsteil of Herleshausen
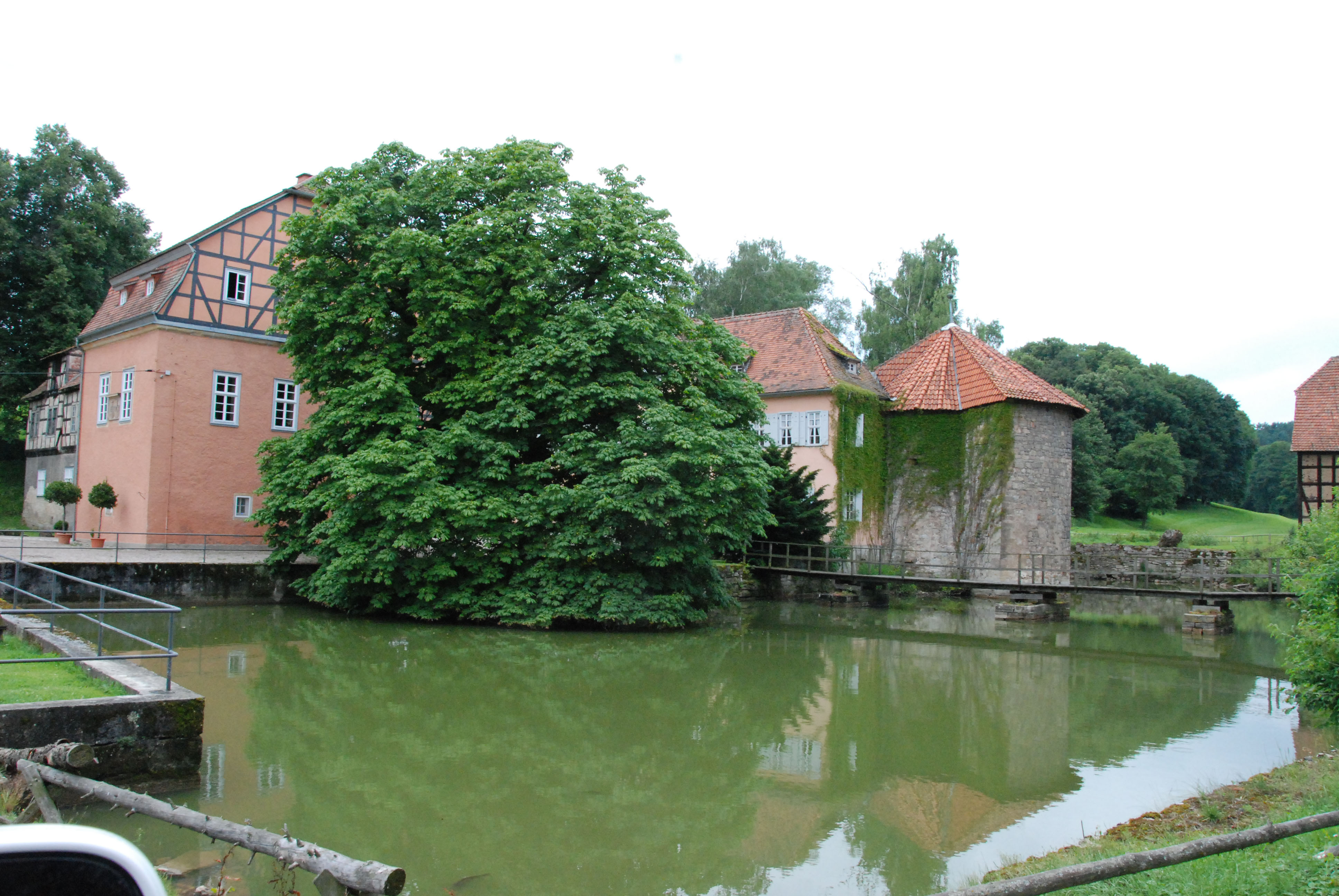
- Interactive map of Willershausen
- Location within Germany Location within Hesse
- Coordinates: 51°02′10.36″N 10°10′50.92″E
- Country: Germany
- State: Hesse
- Admin. region: Kassel
- District: Werra-Meißner-Kreis
- Municipality: Herleshausen
- Elevation: 320–387 m (1,050–1,270 ft)

Population
  - Total: 219
- Time zone: UTC+01:00 (CET)
  - Summer (DST): UTC+02:00 (CEST)
- Postal codes: 37293
- Dialling codes: 05654

Willershausen is a village and castle in the Gemeinde of Herleshausen in Werra-Meißner-Kreis, Hesse.

In 1383, the Treusch von Buttlar were lords of Willershausen and adjacent areas. Already at the end of the 13th Century, the residential tower and the defensive tower of the present castle were built. The Treusch von Buttlar were the owners until the death of Ernst Carl Treusch von Buttlar (see section below) in 1757. The castle came to the von Kutzleben family and the Schwebheim branch of the von Bibra family in 1757. The estate was divided between the two families on 27 September 1817. Ernst von Bibra sold their portion in 1850 to Landgrave Carl August of Hesse. From 1889 to 1992 the Landgraves of Hesse were owner of the property. Today, a golf course is maintained. The church in Willershausen is worth seeing.

== The Robbers inspiration ==
The relationship to Friedrich Schiller and the history of his play The Robbers is especially interesting. Family of Treusch von Buttlar at Willershausen, around 1730/40, served as an inspiration and background to his drama.

One source of The Robbers was Christian Schubart’s Zur Geschichte des Menschlichen Herzens (Concerning the History of the Human Heart, 1775) version as well as the real life story about the case of two Treusch von Buttlar brothers. The older good brother Ernst Carl and the evil younger brother Hans Hermann Wilhelm (Wilhelm). This was one of the greatest social and legal scandals in early eighteen century Franconia.

Major Wilhelm von Buttlar married Eva Eleonora (Elenora) von Lentersheim at Obersteinbach castle (Obersteinbach website refers to him as Franz). Her father Erhard von Lentersheim was an epileptic and alcoholic. He was put under a guardianship. As the son-in-law, Wilhelm exercised the right of disposing of his goods to himself (Wilhelm). Additionally, to further benefit Wilhelm because Wilhelm’s mother-in-law, Louisa von Lentersheim (née von Eyb), had property of her own, Wilhelm had her strangled on December 7, 1727 by a servant. While the trial lasted for years, it did not end in conviction. Schiller also went to school with Wilhelm Philipp Johann Ludwig von Bibra (Adelsdorf) (1765-1794) at the Carlsakademie. As a close relative of the murdered mother-in-law, Wilhelm von Bibra may have spurred Schiller interest in the incident.

== Photo gallery ==
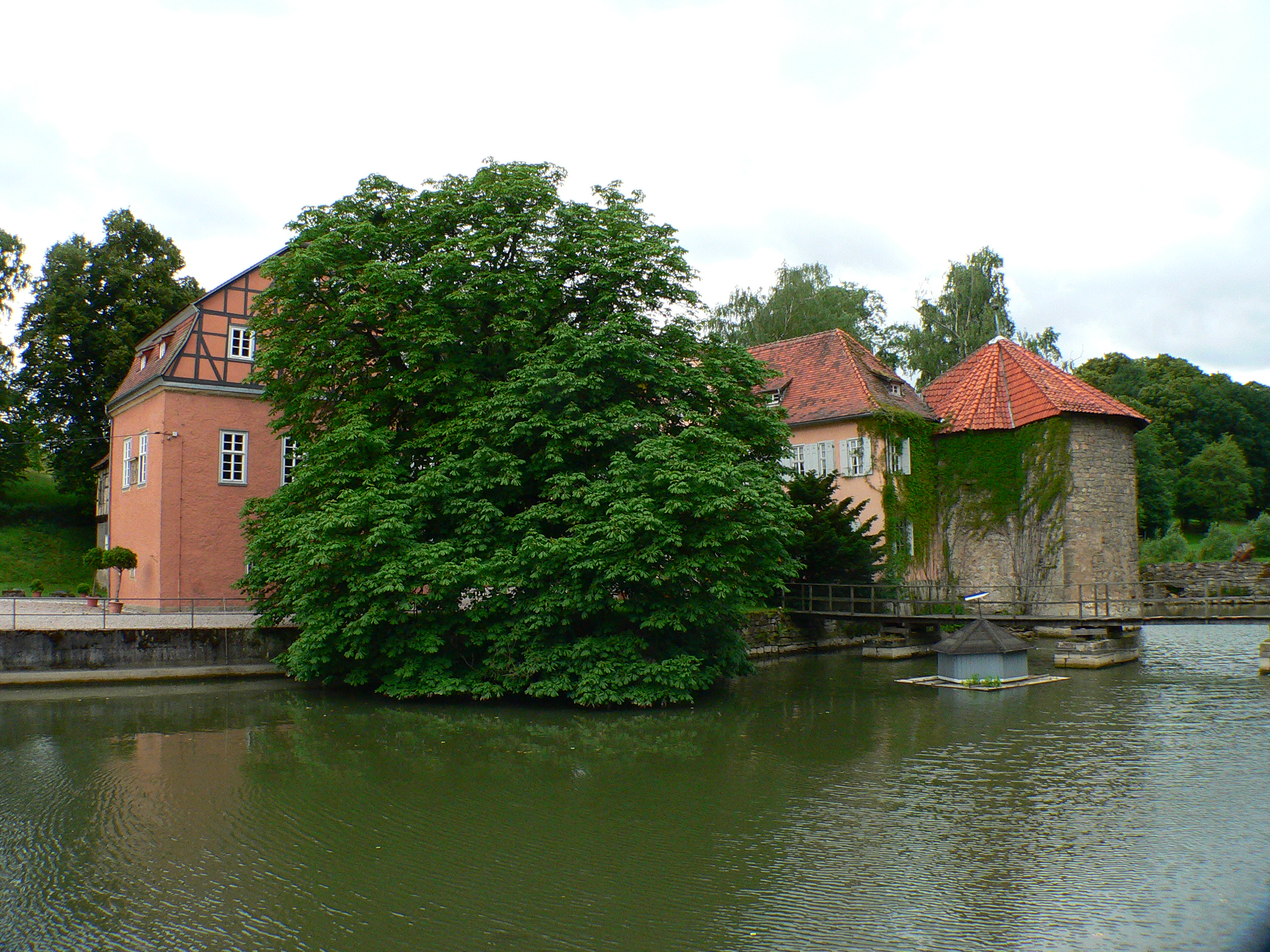

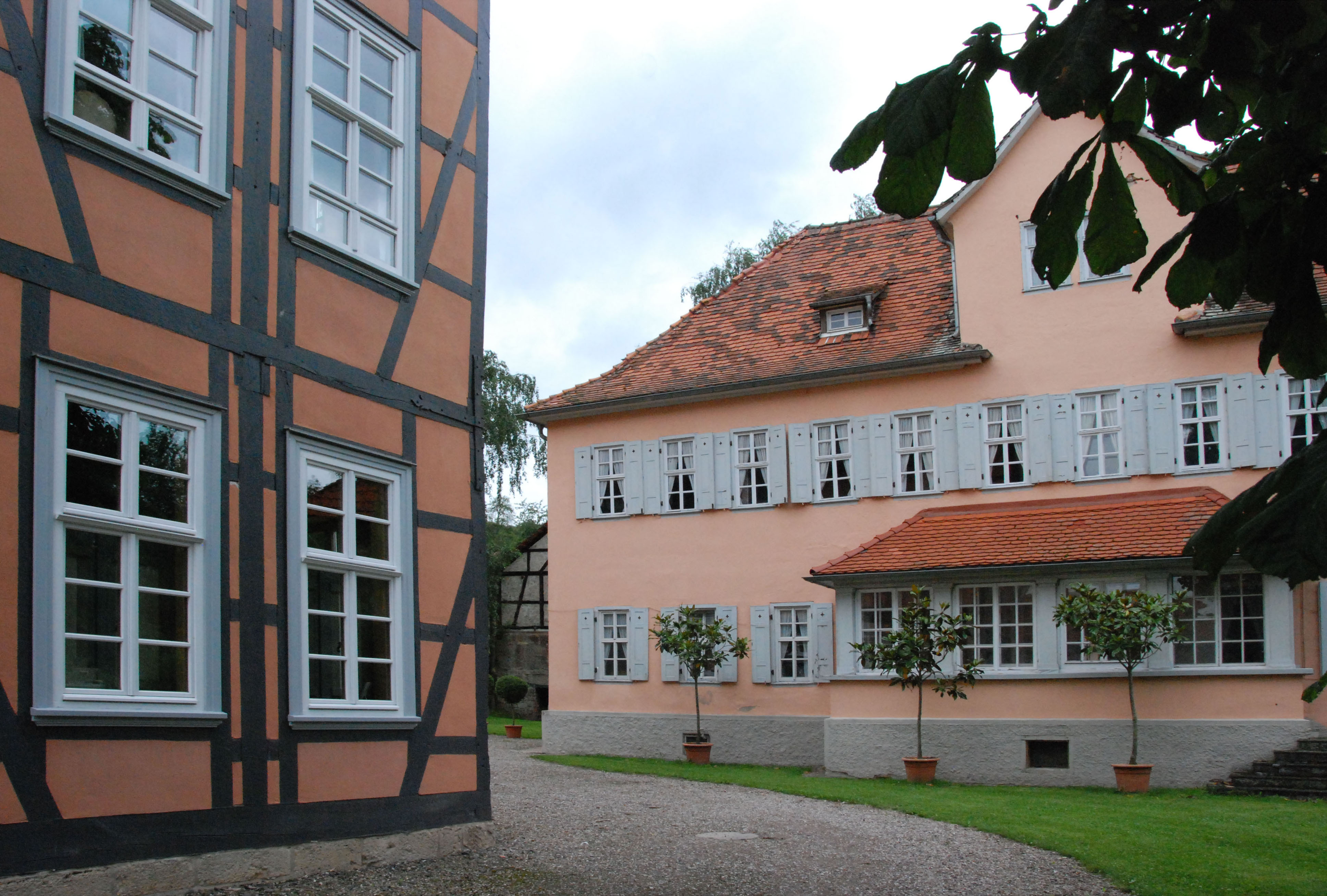

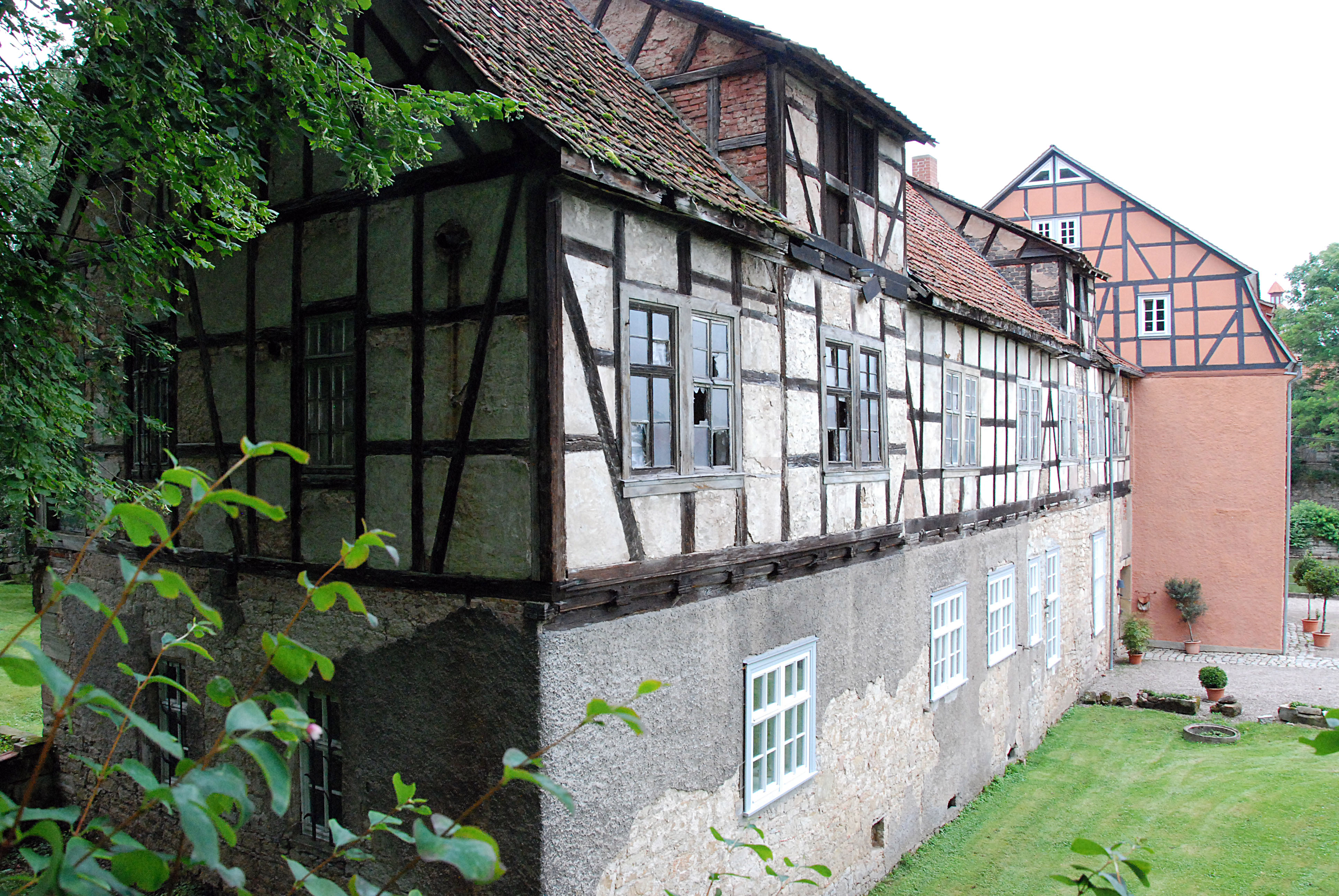

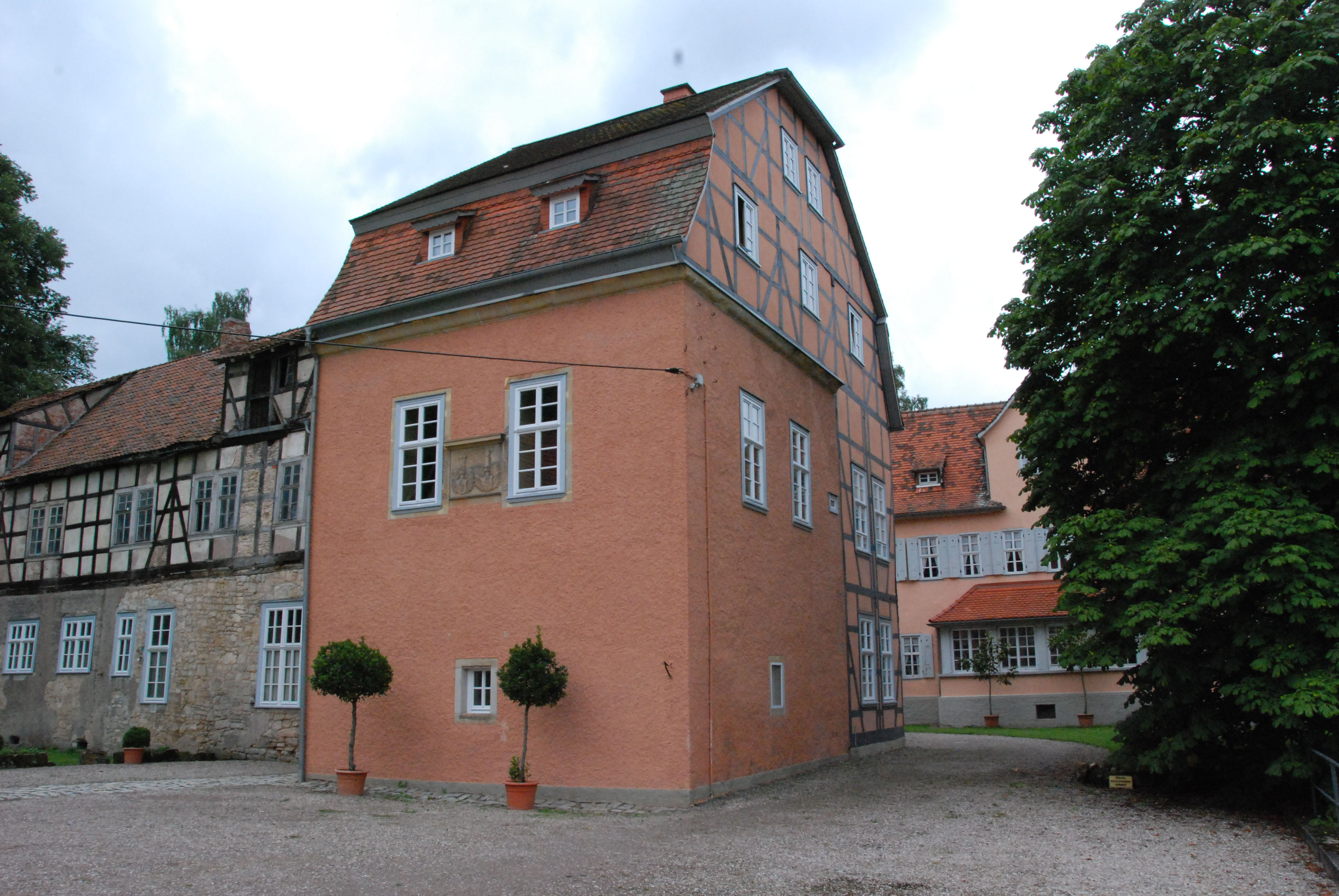

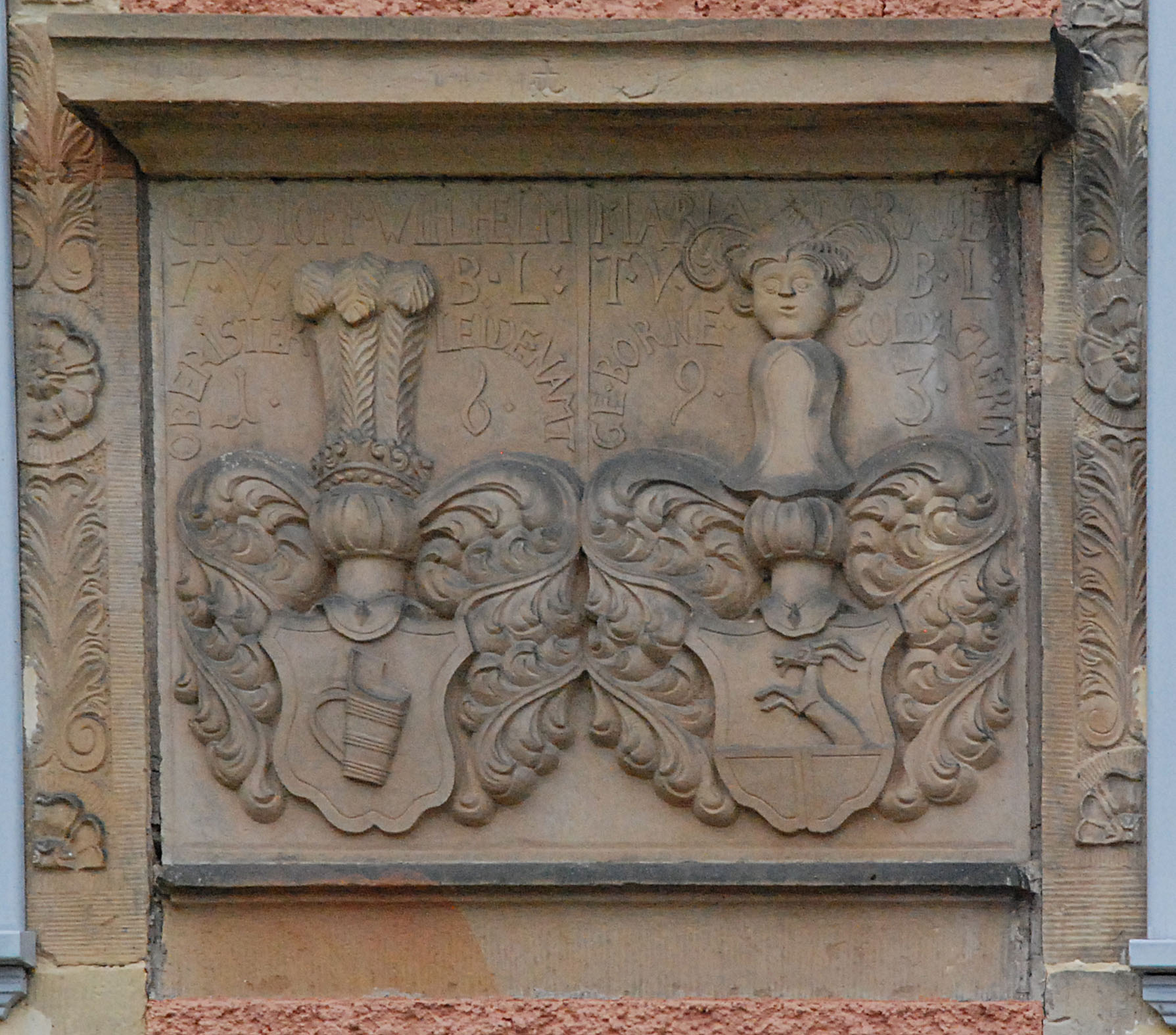
Coat of Arms of the Treusch von Buttlar family (left)
