= Amelia Cary, Viscountess Falkland =

Illegitimate daughter of William IV (1807–1858)

The Right Honourable The Viscountess Falkland
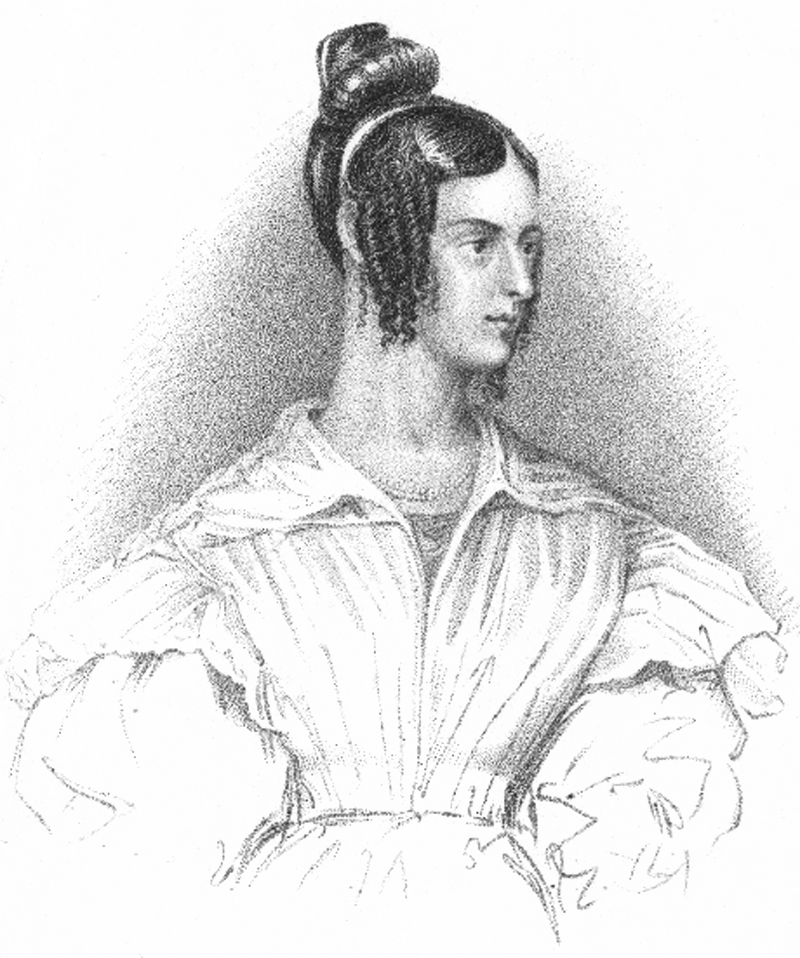
- Born: Amelia FitzClarence; 21 March 1807
- Died: 2 July 1858 (aged 51); London, England
- Family: FitzClarence
- Spouse: Lucius Cary, 10th Viscount Falkland (m. 1830)
- Issue: Lucius Cary, Master of Falkland
- Father: William IV
- Mother: Dorothea Jordan

Amelia Cary, Viscountess Falkland (née FitzClarence; 21 March 1807 – 2 July 1858), was a British noblewoman. She was born the fifth illegitimate daughter of William IV of the United Kingdom (then Duke of Clarence and St Andrews) by his long-time mistress Dorothea Jordan. Amelia had four sisters and five brothers, all surnamed FitzClarence. Soon after their father became monarch, the FitzClarence children were raised to the ranks of younger children of a marquess. A granddaughter of George III, Amelia was named after her aunt Princess Amelia.

== Family and early life ==
Amelia FitzClarence was the fifth daughter of Prince William, Duke of Clarence, by his long-time mistress, the famous comic actress Dorothea Jordan. Dorothea was the most successful actress of her day and continued to act on the stage during their relationship. Amelia had nine siblings from the relationship, four sisters and five brothers all surnamed FitzClarence. While circumstances prevented the couple from ever marrying, for twenty years William and Dorothea enjoyed domestic stability and were devoted to their children. In 1797, they moved from Clarence Lodge to Bushy House, residing at the Teddington residence until 1807. Amelia was born there.

Amelia's niece Wilhelmina would later write that Bushy was "a happy and beloved home" until it "came to end" upon Prince William's marriage to Princess Adelaide of Saxe-Meiningen in 1818. He and Dorothea had parted ways in December 1811 under a deed of separation, the debt-ridden duke desiring to secure a rich wife. Dorothea was granted £4,400 and the task of caring for their daughters; William was permitted to visit them until they turned thirteen. She left Bushy in January 1812. The money was not enough to cover her debts, however. Dorothea continued to act on the stage after his leaving. In 1815, she moved from London to Boulogne, France, to evade her creditors. On 5 July 1816, she died there alone. She had suffered from ill health and possessed little money, having squandered the bulk of it on her eldest daughter, Frances (fathered by another man).

William's new wife, Princess Adelaide, was gentle and loving to the FitzClarence children. In 1818, Amelia and her siblings were granted a pension of £500. In 1819, Baron Franz Ludwig von Bibra, a German man with knowledge of the classics and English, was engaged to tutor the two youngest FitzClarence daughters. He left in 1822, upon the completion of their education. In June 1830, the Duke of Clarence succeeded his brother George IV as King William IV. The following year, he made his eldest son, George, Earl of Munster, and had his issue by Jordan raised to the ranks of younger children of a marquess. With their father now monarch, the FitzClarences frequently attended court but their presence angered the Duchess of Kent, who felt that the FitzClarences would be a corrupting influence on her daughter, Princess Victoria. King William loved his children and was aggrieved at their treatment at the hands of the Duchess, who would leave the room whenever they entered.

== Marriage and issue ==
She married Lucius Cary, 10th Viscount Falkland on 27 December 1830 at the Pavilion in Brighton. They had one son, Lucius William Charles Frederick Cary, Master of Falkland (24 November 1831 – 6 August 1871), who married Sarah Christiana Keighly (d. 4 October 1902), but died childless. The couple lived at Rudby Hall, North Yorkshire. Amelia died in London on 2 July 1858.

== Legacy ==
- namesake of Falkland Ridge, Nova Scotia, Canada
- author of Chow-Chow: Being Selections from a Journal Kept in India, Egypt, and Syria

== In popular culture ==
In 1841 Henry Russell dedicated the song The Pilgrim's Address to the Deity to Lady Falkland.

== Ancestry ==
Ancestors of Amelia Cary, Viscountess Falkland

16. George II of Great Britain
8. Frederick, Prince of Wales
17. Caroline of Brandenburg-Ansbach
4. George III of the United Kingdom
18. Frederick II, Duke of Saxe-Gotha-Altenburg
9. Princess Augusta of Saxe-Gotha
19. Magdalena Augusta of Anhalt-Zerbst
2. William IV of the United Kingdom
20. Adolf Frederick II, Duke of Mecklenburg-Strelitz
10. Duke Charles Louis Frederick of Mecklenburg
21. Princess Christiane Emilie of Schwarzburg-Sondershausen
5. Charlotte of Mecklenburg-Strelitz
22. Ernest Frederick I, Duke of Saxe-Hildburghausen
11. Princess Elisabeth Albertine of Saxe-Hildburghausen
23. Countess Sophia Albertine of Erbach-Erbach
1. Amelia Cary, Viscountess Falkland
24. James Bland
12. Nathaniel Bland
25. Lucy Brewster
6. Francis Bland
26. Francis Heaton
13. Elizabeth Heaton
27. Elizabeth Curtis
3. Dorothea Jordan
7. Grace Phillips
