= Race and health =

Health based on racial identity

Race and health refers to how being identified with a specific race influences health. In the United States, race is a complex concept that has changed across chronological eras and depends on both self-identification and social recognition. In the study of race and health, some American scientists organize people in racial categories depending on different factors such as: phenotype, ancestry, social identity, genetic makeup and lived experience. Race and ethnicity often remain undifferentiated in American health research.

Differences in health status, health outcomes, life expectancy, and many other indicators of health in different racial and ethnic groups are well documented. Epidemiological data indicate that American racial groups are unequally affected by diseases, in terms of morbidity and mortality. Some individuals in certain racial groups receive less care, have less access to resources, and live shorter lives in general. Overall, racial health disparities appear to be rooted in social disadvantages associated with race such as implicit stereotyping and average differences in socioeconomic status.

According to the U.S. Centers for Disease Control and Prevention, health disparities are defined as "preventable differences in the burden of disease, injury, violence, or opportunities to achieve optimal health that are experienced by socially disadvantaged populations" and are intrinsically related to the "historical and current unequal distribution of social, political, economic and environmental resources".

The relationship between race and health has been studied from multidisciplinary perspectives, with increasing focus on how racism influences health disparities, and how environmental and physiological factors respond to one another and to genetics. In the United States, research highlights a need for more race-conscious approaches in addressing social determinants, as current social needs interventions show limited adaptation to racial and ethnic disparities.

== Racial health disparities in the United States ==
External videos
- Covid-19: Why race matters for health. Knowable Magazine. 3 June 2021. doi:10.1146/knowable-052221-2.
- How racism makes us sick. TEDMED. November 2016.
- HGP10 Symposium: Genomics and Disparities in Health and Health Care - David Williams. National Human Genome Research Institute. 30 April 2013 – via YouTube.

Health disparities refer to gaps in the quality of health and health care across racial and ethnic groups. The US Health Resources and Services Administration defines health disparities as "population-specific differences in the presence of disease, health outcomes, or access to health care". Health is measured through variables such as life expectancy and incidence of diseases.

For racial and ethnic minorities in the United States, health disparities take on many forms, including higher rates of chronic disease, premature death, and maternal mortality compared to the rates among whites. For example, African Americans are 2–3 times more likely to die as a result of pregnancy-related complications than white Americans. This pattern is not universal. Some minority groups—most notably, Hispanic immigrants—may have better health outcomes than whites when they arrive in the United States. However this appears to diminish with time spent in the United States. For other indicators, disparities have shrunk, not because of improvements among minorities but because of declines in the health of majority groups.

In the U.S., more than 133 million Americans (45% of the population) have one or more chronic diseases. One study has shown that between the ages of 60 and 70, racial/ethnic minorities are 1.5 to 2.0 times more likely than whites (Hispanic and non Hispanic) to have one of the four major chronic diseases specifically Diabetes, cancer, cardiovascular disease (CVD), and chronic lung disease. However, the greatest differences only occurred among people with single chronic diseases. Racial/ethnic differences were less distinct for some conditions including multiple diseases. Non-Hispanic whites trended toward a high prevalence for dyads of cardiovascular disease (CVD) with cancer or lung disease. Hispanics and African Americans had the greatest prevalence of diabetes, while non-Hispanic blacks had higher odds of having heart disease with cancer or chronic lung disease than non-Hispanic whites. Among non-Hispanic whites the prevalence of multimorbidities that include diabetes was low; however, non-Hispanic whites had a very high prevalence of multimorbidities that exclude diabetes. Non-Hispanic whites had the highest prevalence of cancer only or lung disease only. Black Americans have an increased risk of death from COVID-19 compared to white Americans. In a study in Michigan in 2020 regarding COVID-19, it is shown that Black people are 3.6 times more likely to die due to COVID-19.

Between 1960 and 2005 the percentage of children with a chronic disease in the United States quadrupled with minority having higher likelihood for these disease. The most common major chronic biases of youth in the United States are asthma, diabetes mellitus, obesity, hypertension, dental disease, attention deficit hyperactivity disorder (ADHD), mental illness, cancers and others. This results in Black and Latin adult patients facing a disproportionate amount of health concerns, such as asthma, with treatment and management guidelines not developed with studies based on their populations and healthcare needs.

Although individuals from different environmental, continental, socioeconomic, and racial groups etc. have different levels of health, yet not all of these differences are always categorized or defined as health disparities. Some researchers separate definitions of health inequality from health disparity by preventability. Health inequalities are often categorized as being unavoidable i.e. due to age, while preventable unfair health outcomes are categorized as health inequities. These are seen as preventable because they are usually associated with income, education, race, ethnicity, gender, and more.

=== Mental health ===
Studies conducted in the United States have indicated that minorities have similar or smaller rates of prevalence for mental health disorders as their majority counterparts. Blacks (24.6%) and Hispanics (19.6%) have lower depression rates than their White counterparts (34.7%) in the United States. While racial/ethnic minority groups may have similar prevalence rates, the consequences because of mental illness are more prolonged – which may be partly explained due to the smaller access rates for mental health treatments. In 2018, while 56.7% of the general US population who had a mental illness didn't seek treatment, 69.4% and 67.1% Black and Hispanics didn't access care. Further, in the instances of some mental illnesses, such as schizophrenia, Blacks in the United States have been reported to have higher rates compared to their White counterparts, however, research suggests that this could be due to an overdiagnosis among clinicians and underdiagnosis for other illnesses, such as mood disorders, for which Blacks had lower reported prevalence rates for major depression. These instances of misdiagnosis may be due to "lack of cultural understanding by health care providers,...language differences between patient and provider, stigma of mental illness among minority groups, and cultural presentation of symptoms. Minority groups commonly report experiences with racism and discrimination, and they consider these experiences to be stressful. In a national probability sample of minority groups and whites. African Americans and Hispanic American reported experiencing higher overall levels of global stress than did whites.

==== Effects of systemic racism ====
In the United States, the mental health of African Americans has been shown to be negatively impacted by systemic racism, contributing to increased risk of mortality from substance use disorders. This negative mental health can lead to reaching for substances to cope with the mental effects of systemic racism.

== Defining race ==
Definitions of race are ambiguous due to the various paradigms used to discuss race. These definitions are a direct result of biological and social views. Definitions have changed throughout history to yield a modern understanding of race that is complex and fluid. Moreover, there is no one definition that stands, as there are many competing and interlocking ways to look at race. Due to its ambiguity, terms such as race, genetic population, ethnicity, geographic population, and ancestry are used interchangeably in everyday discourse involving race. Some researchers critique this interchangeability noting that the conceptual differences between race and ethnicity are not widely agreed upon.

Even though there is a broad scientific agreement that essentialist and typological conceptions of race are untenable, scientists around the world continue to conceptualize race in widely differing ways. Historically, biological definitions of race have encompassed both essentialist and anti-essentialist views. Essentialists have sought to show that racial groups are genetically distinct populations, describing "races as groups of people who share certain innate, inherited biological traits". In contrast, anti-essentialists have used biological evidence to demonstrate that "race groupings do not reflect patterns of human biological variation, countering essentialist claims to the contrary".

Over the past 20 years, a consensus has emerged that, while race is partially based on physical similarities within groups, it does not have an inherent physical or biological meaning. In response, researchers and social scientists have begun examining notions of race as constructed. Racial groups are "constructed" from differing historical, political, and economic contexts, rather than corresponding to inherited, biological variations. Proponents of the constructionist view claim that biological definitions have been used to justify racism in the past and still have the potential to be used to encourage racist thinking in the future. Since race is changing and often so loosely characterized on arbitrary phenotypes, and because it has no genetic basis, the only working definition we can assign it is a social construct. Race can be an important epidemiologic category, however to suggest that the concept of race has any scientific merit or has a scientific foundation can lead to many issues in scientific research, and it may also lead to inherent racial bias.

Social interpretations of race explains that social views also better explain the ambiguity of racial definitions. An individual may self-identify as one race based on one set of determinants (for example, phenotype, culture, ancestry) while a society may ascribe the person otherwise based on external forces and discrete racial standards. Dominant racial conceptions influence how individuals label both themselves and others within a society. Modern human populations are becoming more difficult to define within traditional racial boundaries due to racial admixture. Most scientific studies, applications, and government documents ask Americans to self-identify race from a limited assortment of common racial categories.

In the United States, race is a cause discrimination, prejudice, marginalization, and even subjugation. Despite the social costs, American researchers argue racial categorization remains beneficial to diagnosis and research. The conflict between self-identification and societal ascription further complicates biomedical research and public health policies. However complex its sociological roots, race has biological ramifications; the intersection of race, science, and society permeates everyday American life and influences human health via genetics, access to medical care, diagnosis, and treatment.

== Race and disease ==
Diseases affect racial groups when they are co-related with class disparities. As socioeconomic factors influence the access to care, the barriers to access healthcare systems can perpetuate different biological effects of diseases among racial groups that are not pre-determined by biology.

Some researchers advocate for the use of self-reported race as a way to trace socioeconomic disparities and its effects in health in the United States. In the United Kingdom, a study was conducted on the Health Checks program by the United Kingdom's National Health Service, which aims to increase diagnosis across demographics. The study was done to address "the reported lower uptake of screening in specific black and minority ethnic communities who are recognised as being more at risk of cardiovascular disease." The lack of attention to certain demographics can be seen as a cause of increased instances of disease from this lack of proper, equal preventive care. One must consider these external factors when evaluating statistics on the prevalence of disease in populations, even though genetic components can play a role in predispositions to contracting some illnesses.

Individuals who share a similar genetic makeup can also share certain propensity or resistance to specific diseases. However, there are confronted positions in relation to the utility of using 'races' to talk about populations sharing a similar genetic makeup. Some geneticists argued that human variation is geographically structured and that genetic differences correlate with general conceptualizations of racial groups. Others claimed that this correlation is too unstable and that the genetic differences are minimal and they are "distributed over the world in a discordant manner". Therefore, self-reported population ancestry is regarded by some as a useful tool for the assessment of genetic epidemiological risk, while others consider it can lead to an increased underdiagnosis in 'low risk' populations.

=== Single-gene disorders ===
There are many autosomal recessive single gene genetic disorders that differ in frequency between different populations due to the region and ancestry as well as the founder effect. Some examples of these disorders include:

- Cystic fibrosis, the most common life-limiting autosomal recessive disease among people of Northern European heritage
- Sickle-cell anemia, most prevalent in populations with sub-Saharan African ancestry but also common among Latin-American, Middle Eastern populations, as well as those people of South European regions such as Turkey, Greece, and Italy
- Thalassemia, most prevalent in populations having Mediterranean ancestry, to the point that the disease's name is derived from Greek thalassa, "sea"
- Tay–Sachs disease, an autosomal recessive disorder most common among Ashkenazi Jews, French Canadians of Saguenay–Lac-Saint-Jean, Cajuns of Louisiana and Old Order Amish of Pennsylvania
- Hereditary hemochromatosis, most common among persons having Northern European ancestry, in particular those people of Celtic descent
- Hermansky–Pudlak syndrome, most common among Puerto Ricans
- Finnish heritage diseases, autosomal recessive diseases that are far more common among Finns

=== Multifactorial polygenic diseases ===
Many diseases differ in frequency between different populations. However, complex diseases are affected by multiple factors, including genetic and environmental. There is controversy over the extent to which some of these conditions are influenced by genes, and ongoing research aims to identify which genetic loci, if any, are linked to these diseases. "Risk is the probability that an event will occur. In epidemiology, it is most often used to express the probability that a particular outcome will occur following a particular exposure." Different populations are considered "high-risk" or "low-risk" groups for various diseases due to the probability of that particular population being more exposed to certain risk factors. Beyond genetic factors, history and culture, as well as current environmental and social conditions, influence a certain population's risk for specific diseases.

=== Disease progression ===
Racial groups may differ in how a disease progresses. Different access to healthcare services, different living and working conditions influence how a disease progresses within racial groups in the United States. However, the reasons for these differences are multiple, and should not be understood a consequence of genetic differences between races, but rather as effects of social and environmental factors affecting.

=== Prevention ===
Genetics has been proven to be a strong predictor for common diseases such as cancer, cardiovascular disease (CVD), diabetes, autoimmune disorders, and psychiatric illnesses. Some geneticists have determined that "human genetic variation is geographically structured" and that different geographic regions correlate with different races. Meanwhile, others have claimed that the human genome is characterized by clinal changes across the globe, in relation with the "Out of Africa" theory and how migration to new environments cause changes in populations' genetics over time.

Some diseases are more prevalent in some populations identified as races due to their common ancestry. Thus, people of African and Mediterranean descent are found to be more susceptible to sickle-cell disease while cystic fibrosis and hemochromatosis are more common among European populations. Some physicians claim that race can be used as a proxy for the risk that the patient may be exposed to in relation to these diseases. However, racial self-identification only provides fragmentary information about the person's ancestry. Thus, racial profiling in medical services would also lead to the risk of underdiagnosis.

While genetics plays a role in determining how susceptible a person is to specific diseases, environmental, structural, cultural, and communication messaging factors play a large role as well.

=== Race-based treatment ===
Minority ethnic groups often face structural and cultural barriers to access healthcare services. The development of culturally and structurally competent services and research that meet the specific health care needs of minority groups is still in its infancy.

Scientific studies have shown the lack of efficacy of adapting pharmaceutical treatment to racial categories. "Race-based medicine" is the term for medicines that are targeted at specific racial clusters which are shown to have a propensity for a certain disorder. The first example of this in the U.S. was when BiDil, a medication for congestive heart failure, was licensed specifically for use in American patients that self-identify as black. Previous studies had shown that African American patients with congestive heart failure generally respond less effectively to traditional treatments than white patients with similar conditions.

After two trials, BiDil was licensed exclusively for use in African American patients. Critics have argued that this particular licensing was unwarranted, since the trials did not in fact show that the drug was more effective in African Americans than in other groups, but merely that it was more effective in African Americans than other similar drugs. It was also only tested in African American males, but not in any other racial groups or among women. This peculiar trial and licensing procedure has prompted suggestions that the licensing was in fact used as a race-based advertising scheme.

Critics are concerned that the trend of research on race-specific pharmaceutical treatments will result in inequitable access to pharmaceutical innovation and smaller minority groups may be ignored. This has led to a call for regulatory approaches to be put in place to ensure scientific validity of racial disparity in pharmacological treatment.

An alternative to "race-based medicine" is personalized or precision medicine. Precision medicine is a medical model that proposes the customization of healthcare, with medical decisions, treatments, practices, or products being tailored to the individual patient. It involves identifying genetic, genomic (e.g. whole genome sequencing), and clinical information—as opposed to using race as a proxy for these data—to better predict a patient's predisposition to certain diseases.

== Environmental factors ==
A positive correlation between minorities and a socioeconomic status of being low-income in industrialized and rural regions of the U.S. depict how low-income communities tend to include more individuals that have a lower educational background, most importantly in health. Income status, diet, and education all construct a higher burden for low-income minorities, to be conscious about their health. Research conducted by medical departments at universities in San Diego, Miami, Pennsylvania, and North Carolina suggested that minorities in regions where lower socioeconomic status is common, there was a direct relationship with unhealthy diets and greater distance of supermarkets. Therefore, in areas where supermarkets are less accessible (food deserts) to impoverished areas, the more likely these groups are to purchase inexpensive fast food or just follow an unhealthy diet. As a result, because food deserts are more prevalent in low income communities, minorities that reside in these areas are more prone to obesity, which can lead to diseases such as chronic kidney disease, hypertension, or diabetes.

Furthermore, this can also occur when minorities living in rural areas undergoing urbanization are introduced to fast food. A study completed in Thailand focused on urbanized metropolitan areas: students who participated were diagnosed as "non-obese" in their early life according to their BMI, however were increasingly at risk of developing type 2 diabetes, or obesity as adults, as opposed to young adults who lived in more rural areas during their early life. Therefore, early exposure to urbanized regions can encourage unhealthy eating due to widespread presence of inexpensive fast food. Different racial populations that originate from more rural areas and then immigrate to the urbanized metropolitan areas can develop a fixation for a more westernized diet; this change in lifestyle typically occurs due to loss of traditional values when adapting to a new environment. For example, a 2009 study named CYKIDS was based on children from Cyprus, a country east of the Mediterranean Sea, who were evaluated by the KIDMED index to test their adherence to a Mediterranean diet after changing from a rural residence to an urban residence. It was found that children in urban areas swapped their traditional dietary patterns for a diet favoring fast food.

== Genetic factors ==
The fact that every human has a unique genome is the key to techniques such as genetic fingerprinting. Versions of genetic markers, known as alleles, occur at different frequencies in different human populations; populations that are more geographically and ancestrally remote tend to differ more.

A phenotype is the "outward physical manifestation" of an organism. For humans, phenotypic differences are most readily seen via skin color, eye color, hair color, or height; however, any observable structure, function, or behavior can be considered part of a phenotype. A genotype is the "internally coded, inheritable information" carried by all living organisms. The human genome is encoded in DNA.

For any trait of interest, observed differences among individuals "may be due to differences in the genes" coding for a trait and "the result of variation in environmental condition". This variability is due to gene-environment interactions that influence genetic expression patterns and trait heritability.

For humans, there is "more genetic variation among individual people than between larger racial groups". In general, an average of 80% of genetic variation exists within local populations, around 10% is between local populations within the same continent, and approximately 8% of variation occurs between large groups living on different continents. Studies have found evidence of genetic differences between populations, but the distribution of genetic variants within and among human populations is impossible to describe succinctly because of the difficulty of defining a "population", the clinal nature of variation, and heterogeneity across the genome. Thus, the racialization of science and medicine can lead to controversy when the term population and race are used interchangeably.

=== Evolutionary factors ===
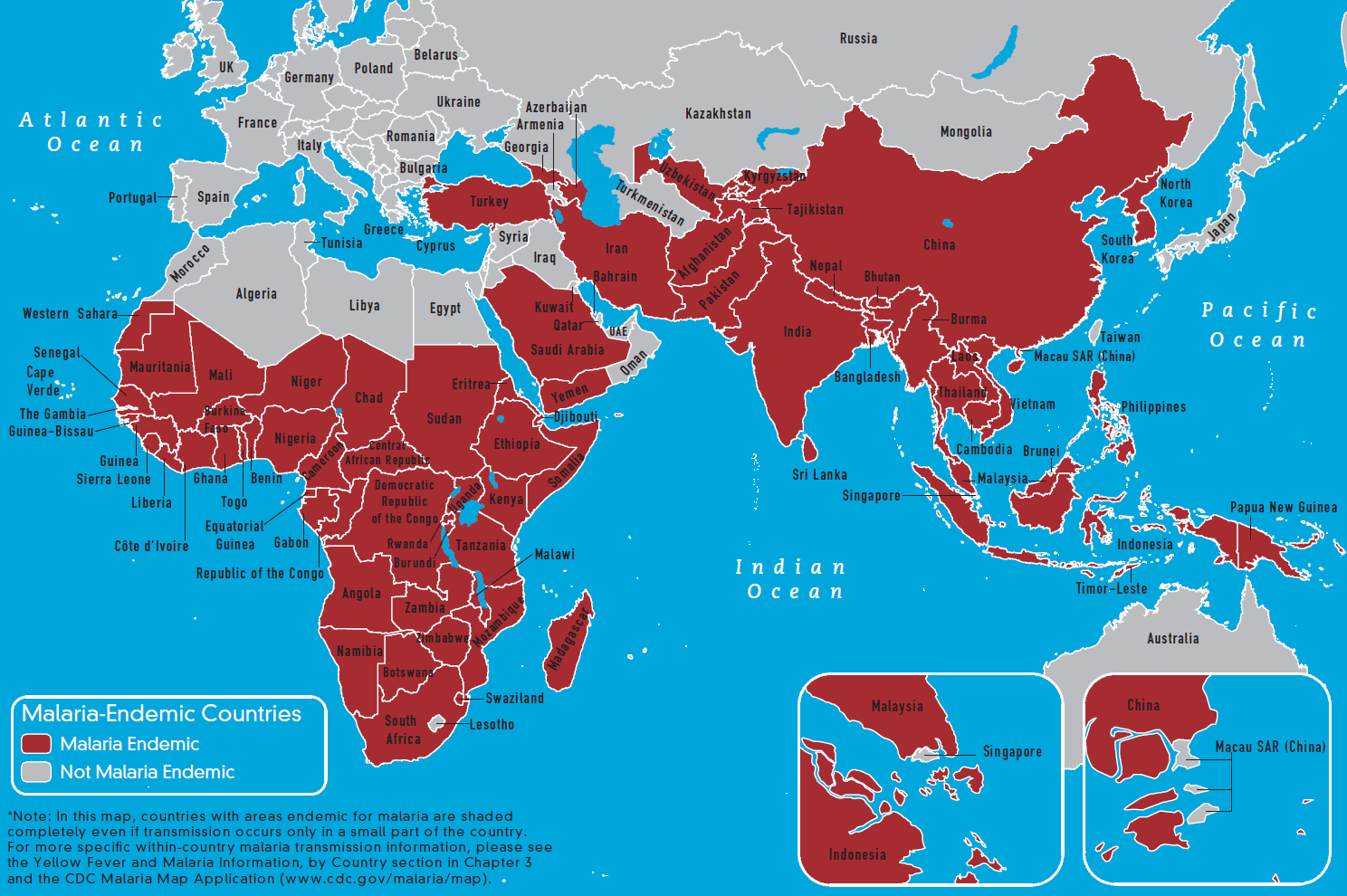
Currently malaria-endemic countries in the eastern hemisphere

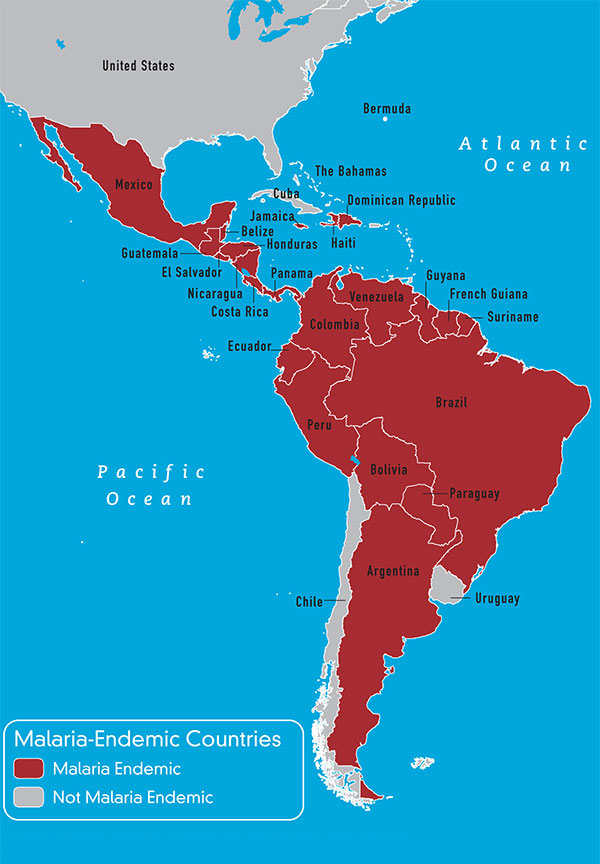
Currently malaria-endemic countries in the western hemisphere

Genes may be under strong selection in response to local diseases. For example, people who are duffy negative tend to have higher resistance to malaria. Most Africans are duffy negative and most non-Africans are duffy positive due to endemic transmission of malaria in Africa. A number of genetic diseases more prevalent in malaria-affected areas may provide some genetic resistance to malaria including sickle cell disease, thalassaemias, glucose-6-phosphate dehydrogenase, and possibly others.

Many theories about the origin of the cystic fibrosis have suggested that it provides a heterozygote advantage by giving resistance to diseases earlier common in Europe.

In earlier research, a common theory was the "common disease-common variant" model. It argues that for common illnesses, the genetic contribution comes from the additive or multiplicative effects of gene variants that each one is common in the population. Each such gene variant is argued to cause only a small risk of disease and no single variant is sufficient or necessary to cause the disease. An individual must have many of these common gene variants in order for the risk of disease to be substantial.

More recent research indicates that the "common disease-rare variant" may be a better explanation for many common diseases. In this model, rare but higher-risk gene variants cause common diseases. This model may be relevant for diseases that reduces fertility. In contrast, for common genes associated with common disease to persist they must either have little effect during the reproductive period of life (like Alzheimer's disease) or provide some advantage in the original environment (like genes causing autoimmune diseases also providing resistance against infections). In either case varying frequencies of genes variants in different populations may be an explanation for health disparities. Genetic variants associated with Alzheimer's disease, deep venous thrombosis, Crohn's disease, and type 2 diabetes appear to adhere to "common disease-common variant" model.

=== Gene flow ===
Gene flow and admixture can also have an effect on relationships between race and race-linked disorders. Multiple sclerosis, for example, is typically associated with people of European descent, but due to admixture African Americans have elevated levels of the disorder relative to Africans.

Some diseases and physiological variables vary depending upon their admixture ratios. Examples include measures of insulin functioning and obesity.

=== Gene interactions ===
The same gene variant, or group of gene variants, may produce different effects in different populations depending on differences in the gene variants, or groups of gene variants, they interact with. One example is the rate of progression to AIDS and death in HIV–infected patients. In whites and Hispanics, HHC haplotypes were associated with disease retardation, particularly a delayed progression to death, while for African Americans, possession of HHC haplotypes was associated with disease acceleration. In contrast, while the disease-retarding effects of the CCR2-641 allele were found in African Americans, they were not found in whites.

== Theoretical approaches in addressing health and race disparities ==
Interdisciplinary methods have been used to address how race affects health. Factors that influence health include income and social status, education, physical environment, social support networks, genetics, health services, targeted instruction, and gender. These determinants are often cited in public health, anthropology, and other social science disciplines. The WHO categorizes these determinants into three broader topics: the social and economic environment, the physical environment, and the person's individual characteristics and behaviors. Due to the diversity of factors that often attribute to health disparities outcomes, interdisciplinary approaches are often implemented.

The salt sensitivity hypothesis is an example of implementing biocultural evolutionary approaches in order to understand cardiovascular health disparities among African American populations. This theory, founded by Wilson and Grim, stems from the disproportional rates of salt sensitive high blood pressure seen between U.S. African American and White populations and between U.S. African American and West Africans as well. The researchers hypothesized that the patterns were in response to two events. One the trans-Atlantic slave trade, which resulted in massive death totals of Africans who were forced over, those who survived and made to the United States were more likely able to withstand the harsh conditions because they retained salt and water better. The selection continued once they were in the United States. African Americans who were able to withstand hard working conditions had better survival rates due to high water and salt retention. Second, today, because of different environmental conditions and increased salt intake with diets, water and salt retention are disadvantageous, leaving U.S. African Americans at disproportional risks because of their biological descent and culture.

== Controversy ==
There is a controversy regarding race as a method for classifying humans. Different sources argue it is purely social construct or a biological reality reflecting average genetic group differences. New interest in human biological variation has resulted in a resurgence of the use of race in biomedicine.

The main impetus for this development is the possibility of improving the prevention and treatment of certain diseases by predicting hard-to-ascertain factors, such as genetically conditioned health factors, based on more easily ascertained characteristics such as phenotype and racial self-identification. Since medical judgment often involves decision making under uncertain conditions, many doctors consider it useful to take race into account when treating disease because diseases and treatment responses tend to cluster by geographic ancestry. The discovery that more diseases than previously thought correlate with racial identification have further sparked the interest in using race as a proxy for bio-geographical ancestry and genetic buildup.

Race in medicine is used as an approximation for more specific genetic and environmental risk factors. Race is thus partly a surrogate for environmental factors such as differences in socioeconomic status that are known to affect health. It is also an imperfect surrogate for ancestral geographic regions and differences in gene frequencies between different ancestral populations and thus differences in genes that can affect health. This can give an approximation of probability for disease or for preferred treatment, although the approximation is less than perfect.

Taking the example of sickle-cell disease, in an emergency room, knowing the geographic origin of a patient may help a doctor doing an initial diagnosis if a patient presents with symptoms compatible with this disease. This is unreliable evidence with the disease being present in many different groups as noted above with the trait also present in some Mediterranean European populations. Definitive diagnosis comes from examining the blood of the patient. In the US, screening for sickle cell anemia is done on all newborns regardless of race.

The continued use of racial categories has been criticized. Apart from the general controversy regarding race, some argue that the continued use of racial categories in health care and as risk factors could result in increased stereotyping and discrimination in society and health services. Some of those who are critical of race as a biological concept see race as socially meaningful group that is important to study epidemiologically in order to reduce disparities. For example, some racial groups are less likely than others to receive adequate treatment for osteoporosis, even after risk factors have been assessed. Since the 19th century, blacks have been thought to have thicker bones than whites have and to lose bone mass more slowly with age. In a recent study, African Americans were shown to be substantially less likely to receive prescription osteoporosis medications than whites. Men were also significantly less likely to be treated compared with women. This discrepancy may be due to physicians' knowledge that, on average, African Americans are at lower risk for osteoporosis than whites. It may be possible that these physicians generalize this data to high-risk African-Americans, leading them to fail to appropriately assess and manage these individuals' osteoporosis. On the other hand, some of those who are critical of race as a biological concept see race as socially meaningful group that is important to study epidemiologically in order to reduce disparities. Black Americans also have the highest mortality rate related to cardiovascular diseases, at about 30 percent higher than white Americans, even after the American Heart Association (AHA) has attempted to lower all risks.

David Williams (1994) argued, after an examination of articles in the journal Health Services Research during the 1966–90 period, that how race was determined and defined was seldom described. At a minimum, researchers should describe if race was assessed by self-report, proxy report, extraction from records, or direct observation. Race was also often used questionable, such as an indicator of socioeconomic status. Racial genetic explanations may be overemphasized, ignoring the interaction with and the role of the environment.

=== From concepts of race to ethnogenetic layering ===
There is general agreement that a goal of health-related genetics should be to move past the weak surrogate relationships of racial health disparity and get to the root causes of health and disease. This includes research which strives to analyze human genetic variation in smaller groups than races across the world.

One such method is called ethnogenetic layering. It works by focusing on geographically identified microethnic groups. For example, in the Mississippi Delta region ethnogenetic layering might include such microethnic groups as the Cajun (as a subset of European Americans), the Creole and Black groups [with African origins in Senegambia, Central Africa and Bight of Benin] (as a subset of African Americans), and Choctaw, Houmas, Chickasaw, Coushatta, Caddo, Atakapa, Karankawa and Chitimacha peoples (as subsets of Native Americans).

Better still may be individual genetic assessment of relevant genes. As genotyping and sequencing have become more accessible and affordable, avenues for determining individual genetic makeup have opened dramatically. Even when such methods become commonly available, race will continue to be important when looking at groups instead of individuals such as in epidemiologic research.

Some doctors and scientists such as geneticist Neil Risch argue that using self-identified race as a proxy for ancestry is necessary to be able to get a sufficiently broad sample of different ancestral populations, and in turn to be able to provide health care that is tailored to the needs of minority groups.

== Association studies ==
One area in which population categories can be important considerations in genetics research is in controlling for confounding between population genetic substructure, environmental exposures, and health outcomes. Association studies can produce spurious results if cases and controls have differing allele frequencies for genes that are not related to the disease being studied, although the magnitude of its problem in genetic association studies is subject to debate. Various techniques detect and account for population substructure, but these methods can be difficult to apply in practice.

Population genetic substructure also can aid genetic association studies. For example, populations that represent recent mixtures of separated ancestral groups can exhibit longer-range linkage disequilibrium between susceptibility alleles and genetic markers than is the case for other populations. Genetic studies can use this disequilibrium to search for disease alleles with fewer markers than would be needed otherwise. Association studies also can take advantage of the contrasting experiences of racial or ethnic groups, including migrant groups, to search for interactions between particular alleles and environmental factors that might influence health.

== Race and medical practice ==
=== History ===
Historically, race has been utilized in medicine in various ways, which continue to have enduring impacts today. The imposition of race on pulmonary function and the machinery used to conduct testing is a noteworthy example. Samuel Cartwright was a 19th-century physician and scientist who is known for his work on spirometry and respiratory physiology. Spirometry is a medical test that measures how much air a person can breathe in and out of their lungs, and how quickly they can do so. Cartwright used spirometry to compare Black enslaved people's lung function to white people's. Cartwright, drawing on Thomas Jefferson's beliefs on pulmonary dysfunction, saw a 20% quantitative difference between Black and White people as proof of deficiency that necessitated the enslavement of Black individuals.

These findings of lower lung capacity by race are present in modern medicine through the correction of race in modern spirometry machines and within most textbooks for medical school. When inputting race into the machine, patients either provide their self-identified race or it is determined by the provider. Spirometers in the US utilize population-specific standards or correction factors of 10% to 15% for Black persons and 4% to 6% for Asian people. Thus, equations derived from Black populations will yield a higher percentage of predicted lung function values than those derived from White populations, which may underestimate lung disease severity and delay detection. However, applying an equation developed from White populations to other racial groups may lead to overdiagnosis and limited eligibility for treatment due to the increased perception of risk. Research regarding the efficacy of race-based spirometry found that the race correction was only accurate for Black patients when their African ancestry was above the median between 81 and 100%. As a result, opponents of race correction say it may cause misdiagnosis and perpetuate racial prejudices by encouraging biological race. These race-based clinical decision support tools, such as pulmonary function testing with spirometry, were ended by a report published by the US House of Representatives Ways and Means Committee in October 2021.

In November 2021, the American Academy of Clinical Neuropsychology issued a statement supporting the elimination of race as a variable in demographically based normative test interpretation, proposing instead an approach analogous to precision medicine in which the social, economic, educational, and healthcare-access factors that race functions as a proxy for would be measured and incorporated directly into prediction models. Alternative approaches have been proposed, for example, in the neuropsychological testing world, including the individual comparison standard (ICS) and incorporating social determinants of health (SDoH) instead of race in regression models. The individual comparison standard (ICS) estimates each patient's premorbid neuropsychological skill level from their own data, for example from a single-word reading or vocabulary measure relatively resistant to brain injury, and compares post-onset performance against that individualized baseline rather than against group norms. The social determinants of health model proposes replacing race in regression-based normative equations with direct measures of factors such as quality of education and socioeconomic status.

=== Sources of racial disparities in care ===
In a report by the Institute of Medicine called Unequal Treatment, three major source categories are put forth as potential explanations for disparities in health care: patient-level variables, healthcare system-level factors, and care process-level variables.

==== Patient-level variables ====
There are many individual factors that could explain the established differences in health care between different racial and ethnic groups. First, attitudes and behaviors of minority patients are different. They are more likely to refuse recommended services, adhere poorly to treatment regimens, and delay seeking care, yet despite this, these behaviors and attitudes are unlikely to explain the differences in health care. In addition to behaviors and attitudes, biological based racial differences have been documented, but these also seem unlikely to explain the majority of observed disparities in care.

==== Health system-level factors ====
Health system-level factors include any aspects of health systems that can have different effects on patient outcomes. Some of these factors include different access to services, access to insurance or other means to pay for services, access to adequate language and interpretation services, and geographic availability of different services. Many studies assert that these factors explain portions of the existing disparities in health of racial and ethnic minorities in the United States when compared to their white counterparts.

==== Care process-level variables ====
Three major mechanisms are suggested by the Institute of Medicine that may contribute to healthcare disparities from the provider's side: bias (or prejudice) against racial and ethnic minorities; greater clinical uncertainty when interacting with minority patients; and beliefs held by the provider about the behavior or health of minorities. While research in this area is ongoing, some exclusions within clinical trials themselves are also present. A recent systematic review of the literature relating to hearing loss in adults demonstrated that many studies fail to include aspects of racial or ethnic diversity, resulting in studies that do not necessarily represent the US population.

A 2023 scoping review of the literature found that in studies conducted in multiracial or multiethnic populations, the inclusion of race or ethnicity variables lacked thoughtful conceptualization and informative analysis regarding race or ethnicity as indicators of exposure to racialized social disadvantage, the systemic and structural barriers, discrimination, and social exclusion faced by individuals and communities based on their race or ethnicity, leading to disparities in access to resources, opportunities, and health outcomes.

== 'Medical racism' ==
An example of "medical racism" (in the words of Robert F. Kennedy Jr.) or "racism" (in the words of US President Bill Clinton) is the Tuskegee Syphilis Study in which, between 1932 and 1972, 400 Black Americans, diagnosed with syphilis, were biomedically experimented on while they were left ignorant of their diagnosis and were not treated with the effective treatments for syphilis existing in that era.

== See also ==
- Average human height by country
- Dark skin § Health implications
- Ethnic bioweapon
- Environmental racism
- French paradox
- HapMap
- Hispanic paradox
  - Mexican paradox
- Light skin § Health implications
- List of countries by life expectancy
- Social determinants of health in poverty § Ethnicity
- Ethnopsychopharmacology
- Cystic fibrosis and race

United States:

- Center for Minority Health
- Environmental Racism in the United States
- Race and health in the United States
