= Falkland Ridge =

Community in Nova Scotia, Canada

- Location within Nova Scotia
- Coordinates: 44°40′20.33″N 64°51′25.57″W
- Country: Canada
- Province: Nova Scotia
- County: Annapolis
- Time zone: UTC-4 (AST)
  - Summer (DST): UTC-3 (ADT)
- Area code: 902

Falkland Ridge is a community in the Canadian province of Nova Scotia, located in Annapolis County.

== Toponomy ==
The community is likely named for Lucius Cary, 10th Viscount Falkland, Governor of Nova Scotia from 1840 to 1846 or his wife Amelia Cary, Viscountess Falkland.
