= Wilhelm von Bibra =

German papal emissary (1442–1490)

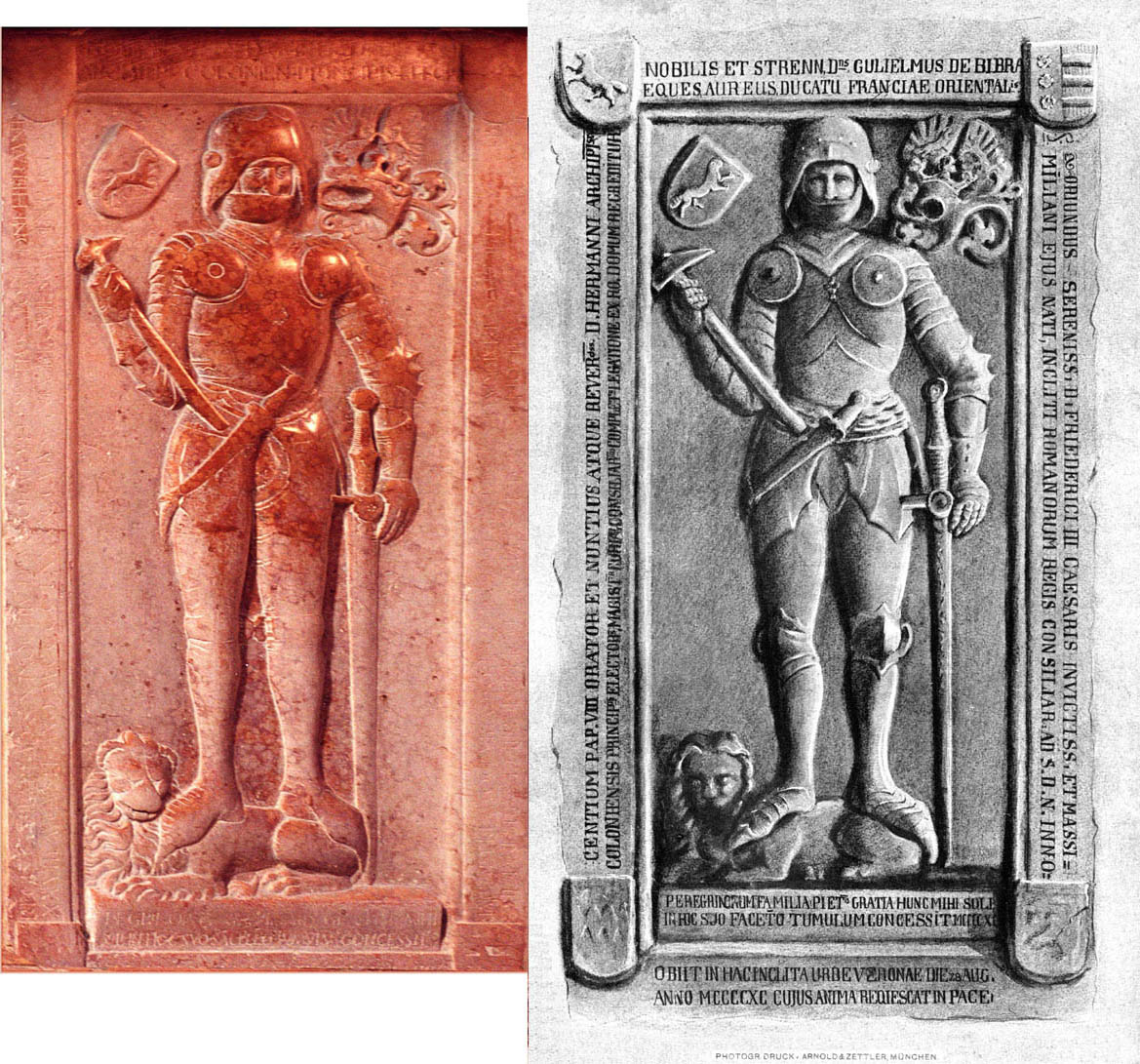
Photograph and lithograph from Beiträge zur Familien Geschichte der Reichsfreiherrn von Bibra, (vol. 2), Wilhelm Frhr. von Bibra, 1882

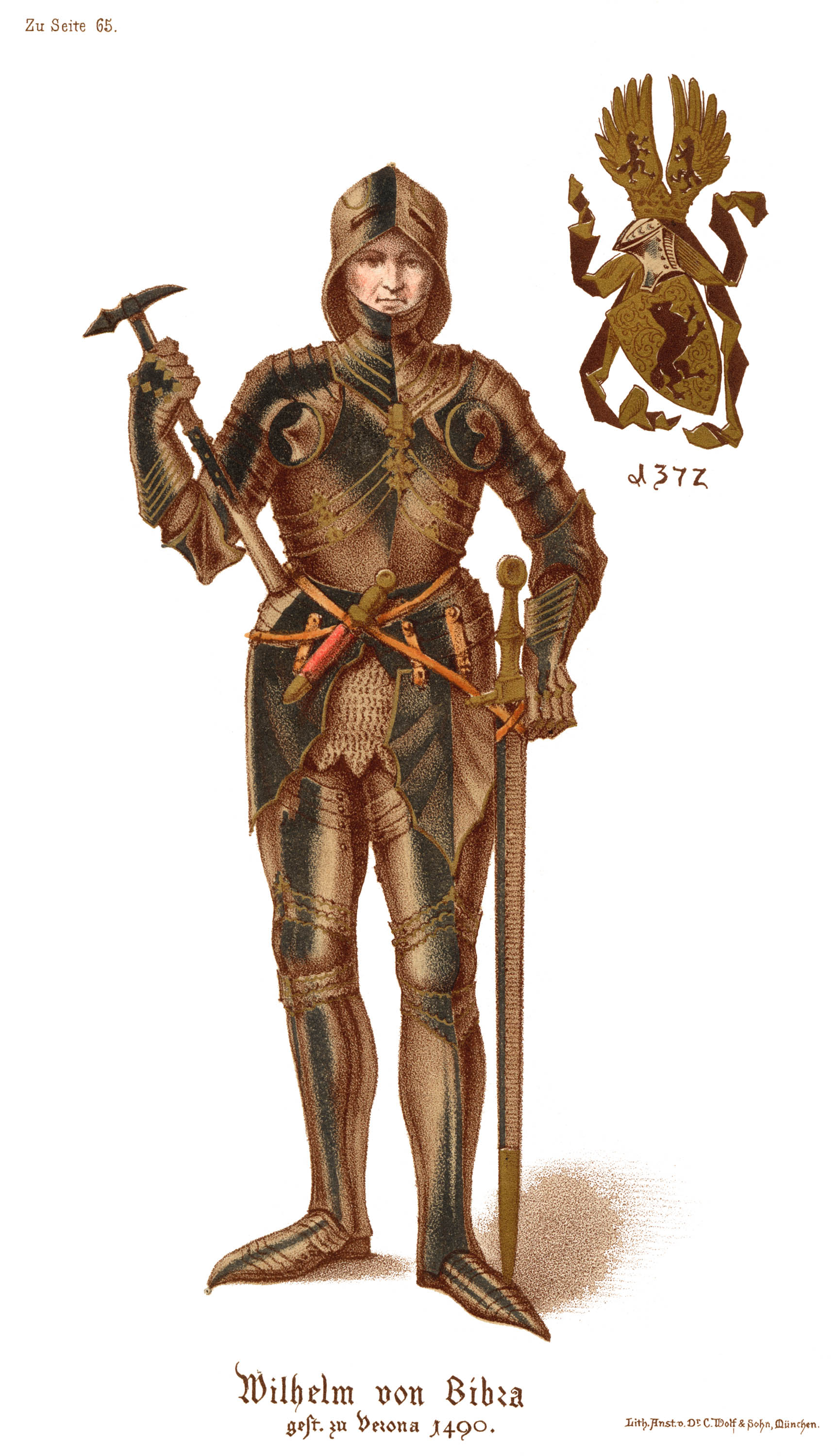
Lithograph from Geschicte der Familie der Freiherrn von Bibra, 1870. Note gilded armor) as a Knight of the Golden Spur, an honoree by 8 July 1490

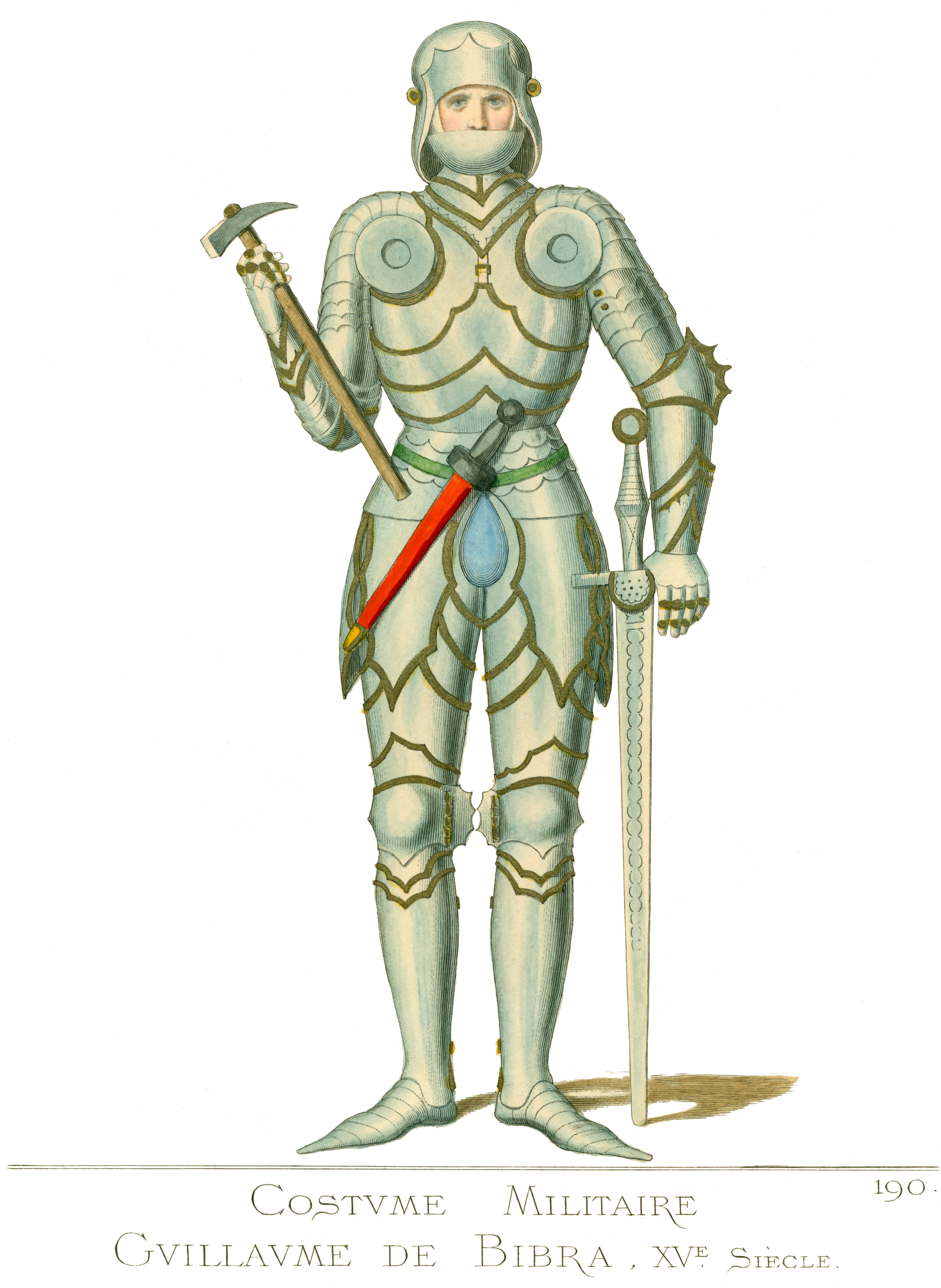
From Camille Bonnard, Costumes Historiques des XIIe, XIIIe, XIVe, et XVI siecles (Paris, 1860: A. Levy Fils 1860). In 1827, Bonnard began a gallery of 13th to 15th century European costumes, published in 75 parts over the next two years, with hand-colored plates by Paul Mercuri.

Wilhelm von Bibra (1442–1490) (Eques auratus) was a Papal emissary.

== Papal emissary ==
Wilhelm functioned as a Papal Emissary for both the archbishop of Cologne and Kaiser Friedrich. Wilhelm’s half brother, Prince Bishop Lorenz von Bibra of Würzburg, in 1487 wrote a letter of introduction to Pope Innocent VIII for Wilhelm who was being sent to the Vatican as emissary of Archbishop Herman of Cologne. As an emissary, he traveled to Rome three times: 1483, 1487, and 1490. By 8 July 1490, Wilhelm was referred to as "miles auratus" (a reference to him being a Knight of the Golden Spur). In 1490, Wilhelm became ill when returning from Rome as an emissary of the emperor Frederick III. He was a guest at the Palazzo of the countly Pellegrini family when he died 28 August 1490. Wilhelm's tomb stone is still to be seen in the Pellegrini Chapel of the Santa Anastasia in Verona. Originally, it was on the floor and was moved to the wall in summer of 1804.

== von Bibra family ==
Wilhelm was a member of the aristocratic Franconian von Bibra family which among its members were Wilhelm’s half brother, Lorenz von Bibra Prince-Bishop of Würzburg, Duke in Franconia, Conrad von Bibra, Prince-Bishop of Würzburg, Duke in Franconia (1490-1544), Heinrich von Bibra, Prince-Bishop, Prince-Abbot of Fulda (1711-1788) and Ernst von Bibra (1806-1878), naturalist and author.

== Description of inscription on grave ==
NOBILIS ET STRENN(uus) D(ominus) GULIELMUS DE BIBRA
EQUES AUREUS DUCATU FRANCIAE ORIENTAL(is)
ORIUNDUS SERENISS(imi) D(omini) FRIEDERICI III CAESARIS INVICTISS(imi) ET MASSI=
MILIANI EIUS NATI, INCLITI ROMANORUM REGIS CONSILIAR(ius) AD S(anctum) D(ominum) N(ostrum) INNO=
CENTIUM PAP(am) VIII ORATOR ET NUNTIUS ATQUE REVER[endissimi) D(omini) HERMANNI ARCHI(e)PI(scopi)
COLONIENSIS PRINCIP(is) ELECTOR(is) MAGIS(ter) CURIAE CONSILIAR(ius) COMPLETA LEGATIONE EX RO(ma) DOMUM REGREDITUR(us)
OBIIT IN HAC INCLITA URBE VERONAE DIE 28. AUG(usti)
ANNO MCCCCXC CUIUS ANIMA REQUIESCAT IN PACE

PEREGRINORUM FAMILIA PIET(ate) ET GRATIA HUNC MIHI SOLI
IN HOC SUO SACELLO TUMULUM CONCESSIT MCCCCXC

“The noble and strict Wilhelm von Bibra, Knight of the Golden Spur, from the Duchy of Eastern Franconia, adviser of the most noble and invincible emperor, Frederick III. and his son Maximilian, the well-known Roman king, representative and envoy to our Holy Lord Innocent VIII, as well as Court Administrator and councilor of the Archbishop of Cologne, Elector Hermann. After completing his mission on the way home from Rome, he died in the famous city of Verona on August 28, 1490. May his soul rest in peace! "

At the feet of the representation:

“Out of piety and grace, the Pellegrini family gave me a grave in their chapel just for me. 1490. "
