= Schwebheim =

- Municipality
- Location of Schwebheim within Schweinfurt district
- Interactive map of Schwebheim
- Location within Germany Location within Bavaria
- Coordinates: 49°59′50″N 10°14′45″E
- Country: Germany
- State: Bavaria
- Admin. region: Unterfranken
- District: Schweinfurt

Government
  - Mayor (2020–26): Volker Karb (CSU)

Area
  - Total: 8.10 km^{2} (3.13 sq mi)
- Elevation: 213 m (699 ft)

Population (2025-12-31)
  - Total: 4,115
  - Density: 508/km^{2} (1,320/sq mi)
- Time zone: UTC+01:00 (CET)
  - Summer (DST): UTC+02:00 (CEST)
- Postal codes: 97525
- Dialling codes: 09723
- Vehicle registration: SW
- Website: www.schwebheim.de

Schwebheim is a municipality in the district of Schweinfurt in Bavaria, Germany. Historically important as the location of the Bibra family castle by the same name. The castle was heavily damaged during severe bombings of Schweinfurt in World War II and only partially repaired. Today, the village is fast becoming a suburb of nearby Schweinfurt.

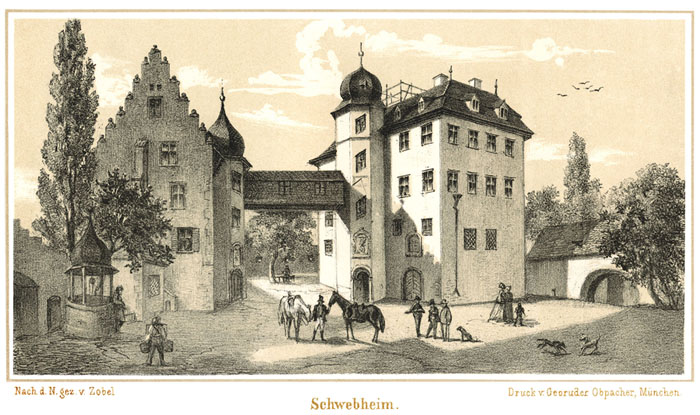
Castle at Schwebheim in 1870 engraving

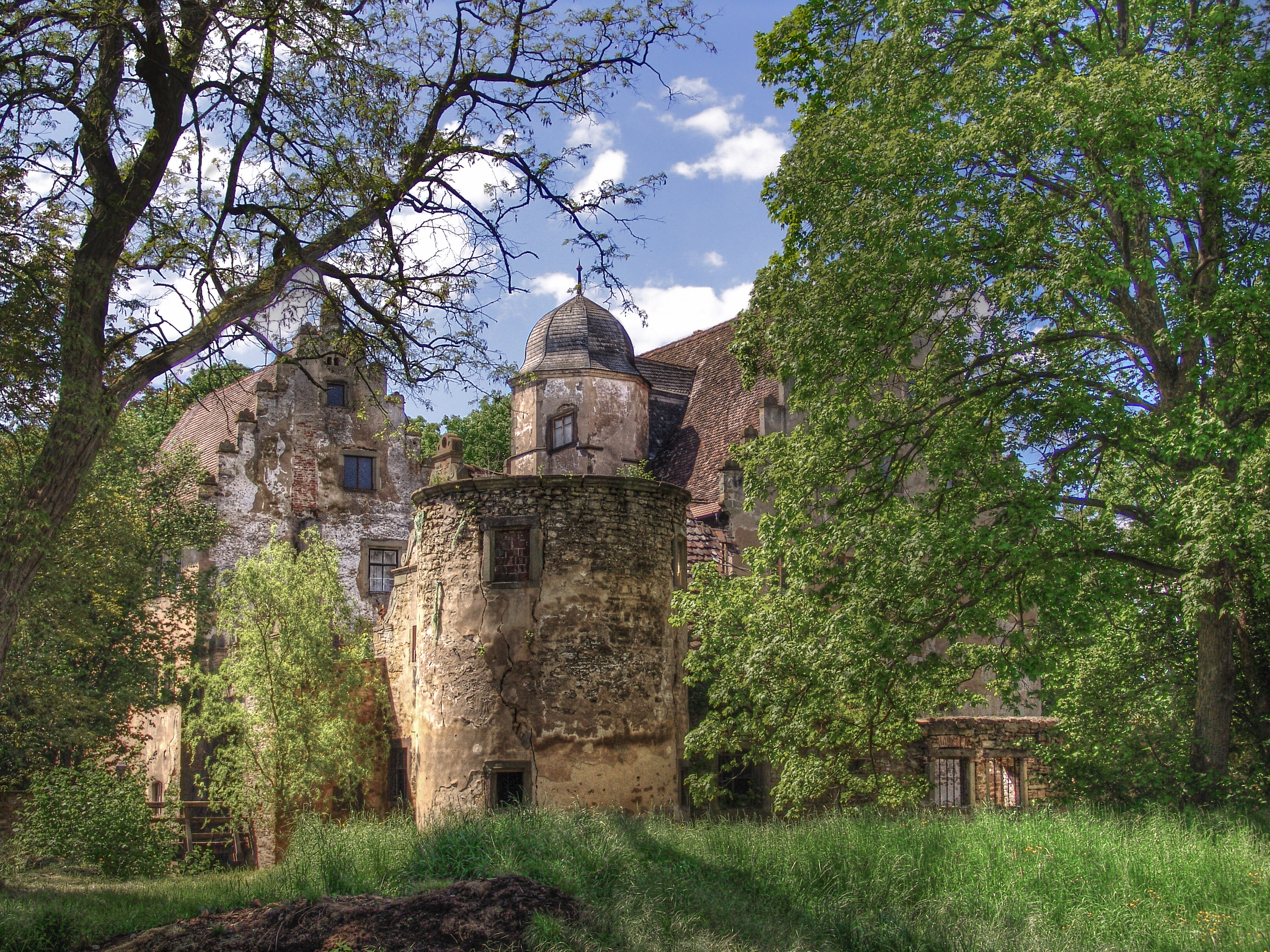
Castle at Schwebheim

== Sons & Daughters of the Town ==
- Ernst von Bibra (1806–1878), botanist, zoologist, metallurgist, chemist, geographer, travel writer, novelist, duellist, art collector and trailblazer in ethnopsychopharmacology
- Abraham Adler (1850–1922), Economist
