= Ethnopsychopharmacology =

Field of study

Ethnopsychopharmacology is a field of study which examines differences in the responses of different racial and ethnic groups to psychiatric medication.

Individuals' state of mental health is correlated to both the function of the brain and environmental factors. This indicates that understanding the correlation between psychological health and cultural associations is key to attempting to understand more about how the brain functions for people of different ethnic and cultural groups.

It has been noted that there are "dramatic cross-ethnic and cross-national variations in the dosing practices and side-effect profiles in response to practically all classes of psychotropics."

== Areas of study ==
=== Physiological responses to medication ===
==== Differences in drug metabolism ====
Drug metabolism is controlled by a number of specific enzymes, and the action of these enzymes varies among individuals. For example, most individuals show normal activity of the IID6 isoenzyme that is responsible for the metabolism of many tricyclic antidepressant medications and most antipsychotic drugs. However, studies have found that one-third of Asian Americans and African Americans have a genetic alteration that decreases the metabolic rate of the IID6 isoenzyme, leading to a greater risk of side effects and toxicity. The CYP2D6 enzyme, important for the way in which the liver clears many drugs from the body, varies greatly between individuals in ways that can be ethnically specific.

Though enzyme activity is genetically influenced, it can also be altered by cultural and environmental factors such as diet, the use of other medications, alcohol and disease states.

==== Differences in pharmacodynamic responses ====
If two individuals have the same blood level of a medication, there may still be differences in the way that their bodies respond to the medication due to pharmacodynamic differences. An individual's pharmacodynamic responses can be influenced by racial and cultural factors.

=== Influence of culture on psychiatric healthcare ===
In addition to biology and environment, culturally determined attitudes toward illness and its treatment may affect how an individual responds to psychiatric medication. Some cultures see suffering and illness as unavoidable and not amenable to medication, while others treat symptoms with polypharmacy, mixing medications with herbal drugs. Cultural attitudes can also have an effect on adherence to medication regimes and influence the placebo effect.

==== Diagnosis of psychological conditions ====
The way an individual expresses and reacts to the symptoms of psychiatric illness, and the cultural expectations of the physician, may affect the diagnosis a patient receives. For example, bipolar disorder is often misdiagnosed as schizophrenia in people of color.

== Consideration of ethnic diversity in research studies ==
Most studies of psychiatric medications have predominantly white male subjects. Since there is often a greater difference within racial and ethnic groups than between them, researchers may choose to either use prototypical representatives of these groups or use a larger random sample. This is also influenced by the fact that broad racial and ethnic groups have many different subgroups. For example, in North American research, it may not be sufficient to characterize individuals as Asian, Hispanic, Native American, or African American. Even within the same ethnic group, there are no reliable measures to determine important cultural differences.

== Related disciplines ==
=== Epidemiology ===
Studying how culture impacts the ways in which disease is spread contributes to understandings of the racial disparities that impact how Western medication is used and perceived.

== See also ==
- Pharmacognosy
- Race and health
