= 2023–24 FC St. Pauli season =

FC St. Pauli
2023–24 season
- President: Oke Göttlich
- Head coach: Fabian Hürzeler
- Stadium: Millerntor-Stadion
- 2. Bundesliga: 1st (promoted)
- DFB-Pokal: Quarter-finals
- Top goalscorer: League: Marcel Hartel (17); All: Marcel Hartel (21)
- Average home league attendance: 29,424
| Home colours | Away colours |

The 2023–24 FC St. Pauli season was the 113th season in the football club's history and 13th consecutive season in the second division of German football, the 2. Bundesliga and 31st overall. In addition to the domestic league, FC St. Pauli also participated in this season's edition of the DFB-Pokal. This was the 61st season for FC St. Pauli in the Millerntor-Stadion, located in St. Pauli, Hamburg, Germany. The season covered a period from 1 July 2023 to 30 June 2024.

== Players ==
=== Squad information ===
As of 1 February 2024

Note: Flags indicate national team as defined under FIFA eligibility rules; some limited exceptions apply. Players may hold more than one non-FIFA nationality.

| No. | Pos. | Nation | Player |
|---|---|---|---|
| 2 | DF | GRE | Manolis Saliakas |
| 3 | DF | EST | Karol Mets |
| 4 | DF | AUT | David Nemeth |
| 5 | DF | GER | Hauke Wahl |
| 6 | FW | GER | Simon Zoller |
| 7 | MF | AUS | Jackson Irvine (captain) |
| 8 | DF | SWE | Eric Smith |
| 9 | FW | BRA | Maurides |
| 10 | MF | GER | Marcel Hartel |
| 11 | FW | GER | Johannes Eggestein |
| 14 | FW | TOG | Etienne Amenyido |
| 15 | FW | LUX | Danel Sinani |
| 16 | MF | GER | Carlo Boukhalfa |
| 17 | FW | ENG | Dapo Afolayan |

| No. | Pos. | Nation | Player |
|---|---|---|---|
| 18 | FW | SCO | Scott Banks (on loan from Crystal Palace) |
| 19 | FW | DEN | Andreas Albers |
| 20 | MF | SWE | Erik Ahlstrand |
| 21 | DF | GER | Lars Ritzka |
| 22 | GK | BIH | Nikola Vasilj |
| 23 | DF | GER | Philipp Treu |
| 24 | MF | AUS | Connor Metcalfe |
| 25 | DF | POL | Adam Dźwigała |
| 26 | FW | TUN | Elias Saad |
| 28 | GK | GER | Sören Ahlers |
| 29 | DF | GER | Luca Günther |
| 30 | GK | GER | Sascha Burchert |
| 36 | MF | GER | Aljoscha Kemlein (on loan from 1. FC Union Berlin) |

=== Transfers ===
==== Summer ====
In:

| No. | Pos. | Nation | Player |
|---|---|---|---|
| 3 | DF | EST | Karol Mets (from FC Zürich, previously on loan) |
| 5 | DF | GER | Hauke Wahl (from Holstein Kiel) |
| 6 | FW | GER | Simon Zoller (from VfL Bochum) |
| 15 | FW | LUX | Danel Sinani (from Norwich City) |
| 18 | FW | SCO | Scott Banks (on loan from Crystal Palace) |
| 19 | FW | DEN | Andreas Albers (from SSV Jahn Regensburg) |
| 23 | DF | GER | Philipp Treu (from SC Freiburg II) |
| 29 | DF | GER | Luca Günther (from FC St. Pauli II) |

Out:

| No. | Pos. | Nation | Player |
|---|---|---|---|
| 1 | GK | GER | Dennis Smarsch (to MSV Duisburg) |
| 5 | DF | KOS | Betim Fazliji (to FC St. Gallen) |
| 6 | DF | GER | Christopher Avevor (released) |
| 13 | MF | GER | Lukas Daschner (to VfL Bochum) |
| 15 | DF | GER | Marcel Beifus (to Karlsruher SC) |
| 18 | DF | CRO | Jakov Medić (to Ajax Amsterdam) |
| 19 | DF | GER | Luca-Milan Zander (to SV Sandhausen) |
| 20 | MF | NGR | Afeez Aremu (to 1. FC Kaiserslautern) |
| 23 | DF | KOS | Leart Paqarada (to 1. FC Köln) |
| 27 | FW | GER | David Otto (to SV Sandhausen) |
| 29 | MF | GER | Niklas Jessen (to FC St. Pauli II) |
| 31 | MF | GER | Franz Roggow (to Borussia Dortmund II) |
| 32 | DF | GER | Jannes Wieckhoff (to Heracles Almelo) |
| 34 | FW | GER | Igor Matanović (to Eintracht Frankfurt, previously on loan) |

=== Transfers ===
==== Summer ====
In:

| No. | Pos. | Nation | Player |
|---|---|---|---|
| 20 | MF | SWE | Erik Ahlstrand (from Halmstads BK) |
| 36 | MF | GER | Aljoscha Kemlein (on loan from 1. FC Union Berlin) |

Out:

| No. | Pos. | Nation | Player |

== Pre-season and friendlies ==
Legend

Win Draw Loss

| 23 June 2023 Friendly | Dunfermline Athletic | 0–3 | FC St. Pauli | Dunfermline, Scotland |
| 19:00 UTC+2 | | Report | Eggestein 10'; Wahl 47'; Otto 75' | Stadium: East End Park; Attendance: 7,255; Referee: Scott Lambie (Scotland) |

| 30 June 2023 Friendly | VfB Oldenburg | 0–6 | FC St. Pauli | Großenkneten |
| 16:30 UTC+2 | | Report | Smith 10' (pen.); Metcalfe 21'; Dźwigała 27'; Otto 52'; Hartel 58' (pen.); Amenyido 79' | Stadium: Ahlhorn SV Hans Jürgen Beil Stadion; Attendance: 700; Referee: Theodor Potiyenko |

| 4 July 2023 Friendly | Randers | 1–4 | FC St. Pauli | Randers, Denmark |
| 15:00 UTC+2 | Isah 47' | Report | Wahl 37'; Albers 49'; Dźwigała 68', 116' | Stadium: Cepheus Park Randers; Attendance: 200; Referee: Robert Schröder |
Note: Four periods of 30 minutes.

| 9 July 2023 Friendly | Austria Lustenau | 1–7 | FC St. Pauli | St. Martin in Passeier, Italy |
| 16:00 UTC+2 | Vasilj 40' (o.g.); Marte (yellow card) 51' | Report | Hartel 1', 10'; Otto 6'; Afolayan 25'; Metcalfe 32'; Eggestein 64'; Nemeth 74' | Stadium: Hugo-Ciatti-Stadion |

| 15 July 2023 Friendly | Sabah FK | 1–4 | FC St. Pauli | St. Martin in Passeier, Italy |
| 12:00 UTC+2 | Mickels 57' | Report | Saad 17', 24'; Afolayan 19'; Albers 75'; Mets (yellow card) 75' | Stadium: Hugo-Ciatti-Stadion; Attendance: 100 |

| 15 July 2023 Friendly | Arminia Bielefeld | 0−2 | FC St. Pauli | St. Martin in Passeier, Italy |
| 15:15 UTC+2 | | Report | Eggestein 25'; Dźwigała 58' | Stadium: Hugo-Ciatti-Stadion; Attendance: 1,000 |

| 22 July 2023 Friendly | FC St. Pauli | 3–0 | Hapoel Tel Aviv | Hamburg |
| 15:00 UTC+2 | Hartel 41'; Saad (yellow card) 43'; Saliakas 54'; Smith 83' | Report | Einbinder (yellow card) | Stadium: Millerntor-Stadion; Attendance: 12,671; Referee: Jarno Wienefeld (Hamburg) |

| 8 September 2023 Friendly | Eintracht Braunschweig | P−P | FC St. Pauli | Braunschweig |
| 13:00 UTC+2 | | Report | | Stadium: Eintracht-Stadion |

| 12 October 2023 Friendly | Werder Bremen | 3−3 | FC St. Pauli | Bremen |
| 13:00 UTC+2 | Njinmah 3'; Bittencourt (yellow card) 28'; Stage 54'; Kownacki 58' (pen.) | Report | Hartel 12' (pen.); Saad 50', 65' | Stadium: Weserstadion Platz 11; Attendance: without spectators Referee: Christoph Kluge (Bremen) |

| 17 November 2023 Friendly | Eintracht Braunschweig | 2−1 | FC St. Pauli | Braunschweig |
| 13:00 UTC+1 | Ihorst 69', 86' | Report | Hartel 36' | Stadium: Eintracht-Stadion; Attendance: 150; Referee: Felix Bickel (Wolfsburg) |

| 7 January 2024 Friendly | Excelsior Rotterdam | P−P | FC St. Pauli | Benidorm, Spain |
| 15:30 UTC+1 | | Report | | Stadium: Estadio Municipal Guillermo Amor; Attendance: no spectators |
Note: The game was cancelled due to multiple cases of illness in the Excelsior squad.

| 12 January 2024 Friendly | VfL Osnabrück | 3−1 | FC St. Pauli | La Nucia, Spain |
| 14:30 UTC+1 | Gnaase 23'; Conteh 35', (penalty missed) 60'; Niemann 133'; Diakhité (yellow card) | Report | Dźwigała 94'; Treu (yellow card); Afolayan (yellow card) | Stadium: Estadi Olímpic Camilo Cano |
Note: The game was played in two halves of 75 minutes each.

== Competitions ==
| Competition | First match | Last match | Starting round | Final position | Record | | | | | | | |
| Competition | First match | Last match | Starting round | Final position | Pld | W | D | L | GF | GA | GD | Win % |
|---|---|---|---|---|---|---|---|---|---|---|---|---|
| 2. Bundesliga | 28 July 2023 | 19 May 2024 | Matchday 1 | Winners | 34 | 20 | 9 | 5 | 62 | 36 | +26 | 58.82 |
| DFB-Pokal | 12 August 2023 | 30 January 2024 | First round | Quarterfinal | 4 | 3 | 1 | 0 | 13 | 5 | +8 | 75.00 |
| Total | | | | | 38 | 23 | 10 | 5 | 75 | 41 | +34 | 60.53 |

Last updated: 19 May 2024
Source: Soccerway

=== 2. Bundesliga ===
==== League table ====
| Pos | Team | Pld | W | D | L | GF | GA | GD | Pts | Qualification or relegation |
|---|---|---|---|---|---|---|---|---|---|---|
| 1 | FC St. Pauli (C, P) | 34 | 20 | 9 | 5 | 62 | 36 | +26 | 69 | Promotion to Bundesliga |
| 2 | Holstein Kiel (P) | 34 | 21 | 5 | 8 | 65 | 39 | +26 | 68 | Promotion to Bundesliga |
| 3 | Fortuna Düsseldorf | 34 | 18 | 9 | 7 | 72 | 40 | +32 | 63 | Qualification for promotion play-offs |
| 4 | Hamburger SV | 34 | 17 | 7 | 10 | 64 | 44 | +20 | 58 | |
| 5 | Karlsruher SC | 34 | 15 | 10 | 9 | 68 | 48 | +20 | 55 | |

Source: DFB
Rules for classification: 1) Points; 2) Goal difference; 3) Goals scored; 4) Head-to-head results; 5) Head-to-head away goals scored; 6) Away goals scored; 7) Play-off.
(Rules 4–6 only apply after home and away matches have been played between the tied teams.)
(C) Champions; (P) Promoted

==== Results summary ====
| Overall | | | | | | | | Home | | | | | | Away | | | | | |
| Pld | W | D | L | GF | GA | GD | Pts | W | D | L | GF | GA | GD | W | D | L | GF | GA | GD |
|---|---|---|---|---|---|---|---|---|---|---|---|---|---|---|---|---|---|---|---|
| 34 | 20 | 9 | 5 | 62 | 36 | +26 | 69 | 11 | 5 | 1 | 35 | 15 | +20 | 9 | 4 | 4 | 27 | 21 | +6 |

Last updated: 19 May 2024.
Source: Kicker

==== Results by round ====
| Round | 1 | 2 | 3 | 4 | 5 | 6 | 7 | 8 | 9 | 10 | 11 | 12 | 13 | 14 | 15 | 16 | 17 | 18 | 19 | 20 | 21 | 22 | 23 | 24 | 25 | 26 | 27 | 28 | 29 | 30 | 31 | 32 | 33 | 34 |
|---|---|---|---|---|---|---|---|---|---|---|---|---|---|---|---|---|---|---|---|---|---|---|---|---|---|---|---|---|---|---|---|---|---|---|
| Ground | A | H | A | H | A | H | H | A | H | A | H | A | H | A | H | A | H | H | A | H | A | H | A | A | H | A | H | A | H | A | H | A | H | A |
| Result | W | D | D | D | D | W | W | W | W | D | W | W | D | W | D | D | D | W | W | W | L | W | W | L | W | W | W | L | L | W | W | L | W | W |
| Position | 5 | 6 | 7 | 9 | 9 | 6 | 2 | 1 | 1 | 1 | 1 | 1 | 1 | 1 | 1 | 1 | 2 | 1 | 1 | 1 | 1 | 1 | 1 | 1 | 1 | 1 | 1 | 1 | 2 | 2 | 1 | 2 | 1 | 1 |

Updated to match(es) played on 19 May 2024. Source: Kicker
A = Away; H = Home; W = Win; D = Draw; L = Loss

==== Matches ====
The league fixtures were unveiled on 30 June 2023.

| 29 July 2023 1 | 1. FC Kaiserslautern | 1−2 | FC St. Pauli | Kaiserslautern |
| 13:00 UTC+2 | Tomiak (yellow card) 45+2'; Ache 66'; Zolinski (yellow card) 90+6' | FCSP Report; Kicker Report | Saad 51'; Mets (yellow card) 54'; Hartel 75' (pen.) | Stadium: Fritz-Walter-Stadion; Attendance: 44,079; Referee: Robert Schröder (Hanover) |

| 5 August 2023 2 | FC St. Pauli | 0−0 | Fortuna Düsseldorf | Hamburg |
| 13:00 UTC+2 | Metcalfe (yellow card) 52'; Mets (red card) 83'; Hürzeler (yellow card) 84'; Nemeth (yellow card) 84'; Sinani (yellow card) 90+5' | FCSP Report; Kicker Report | Gavory (yellow card) 88' | Stadium: Millerntor-Stadion; Attendance: 29,546; Referee: Daniel Schlager (Hügelsheim) |

| 19 August 2023 3 | SpVgg Greuther Fürth | 0−0 | FC St. Pauli | Fürth |
| 13:00 UTC+2 | Michalski (yellow card) 90+4' | FCSP Report; Kicker Report | Irvine (yellow card) 19'; Afolayan (yellow card) 23'; Saad (yellow card) 55'; Metcalfe (yellow card) 59'; Nemeth (yellow card) 60' | Stadium: Sportpark Ronhof Thomas Sommer; Attendance: 12,207; Referee: Tom Bauer (Mainz) |

| 27 August 2023 4 | FC St. Pauli | 0−0 | 1. FC Magdeburg | Hamburg |
| 13:30 UTC+2 | Nemeth (yellow card) 68'; Irvine (yellow card) 76' | FCSP Report; Kicker Report | El Hankouri (yellow card) 50'; Atik (yellow card) 65'; Bell Bell (yellow card) 72' | Stadium: Millerntor-Stadion; Attendance: 29,546; Referee: Sven Jablonski (Bremen) |

| 1 September 2023 5 | Eintracht Braunschweig | 1−1 | FC St. Pauli | Braunschweig |
| 18:30 UTC+2 | Ivanov (yellow card) 23'; Gómez (yellow card) 64'; Helgason 80' | FCSP Report; Kicker Report | Irvine (yellow card) 32'; Saliakas (yellow card) 51'; Saad 59'; Banks (yellow card) 86' | Stadium: Eintracht-Stadion; Attendance: 21,290; Referee: Florian Lechner (Hornstorf) |

| 17 September 2023 6 | FC St. Pauli | 5−1 | Holstein Kiel | Hamburg |
| 13:30 UTC+2 | Metcalfe 4'; Smith 7', (yellow card) 27'; Afolayan 38'; Burchert (yellow card) 45+2'; Saad (yellow card) 49'; Ritzka 69'; Hartel 90+4' | FCSP Report; Kicker Report | Poarth (yellow card) 16'; Holtby (yellow card) 47', (goal) 50'; Rothe (yellow card) 73' | Stadium: Millerntor-Stadion; Attendance: 29,546; Referee: Bastian Dankert (Rostock) |

| 23 September 2023 7 | FC St. Pauli | 3−1 | Schalke 04 | Hamburg |
| 20:30 UTC+2 | Hartel 21' (pen.), 57'; Metcalfe (yellow card) 33'; Boukhalfa 90+2' | FCSP Report; Kicker Report | Polter 29', (yellow card) 83'; Kamiński (yellow card) 45+1'; Brunner (yellow card) 45+2'; Schallenberg (yellow card) 77' | Stadium: Millerntor-Stadion; Attendance: 29,546; Referee: Frank Willenborg (Osnabrück) |

| 30 September 2023 8 | Hertha BSC | 1−2 | FC St. Pauli | Berlin |
| 20:30 UTC+2 | Christensen (yellow card) 56'; Dárdai (yellow card) 79'; Scherhant 83' | FCSP Report; Kicker Report | Eggestein 25'; Hürzeler (yellow card) 37'; Hartel 74' | Stadium: Olympiastadion; Attendance: 66,113; Referee: Deniz Aytekin (Oberasbach) |

| 7 October 2023 9 | FC St. Pauli | 5−1 | 1. FC Nürnberg | Hamburg |
| 20:30 UTC+2 | Saad 4'; Smith (yellow card) 15'; Eggestein 49', 56'; Afolayan (yellow card) 51'; Ritzka (yellow card) 78'; Irvine (yellow card) 87'; Amenyido 90+3'; Metcalfe 90+5' | FCSP Report; Kicker Report | Okunuki 24'; Handwerker (yellow card) 52' | Stadium: Millerntor-Stadion; Attendance: 29,546; Referee: Matthias Jöllenbeck (Freiburg im Breisgau) |

| 21 October 2023 10 | SC Paderborn 07 | 2−2 | FC St. Pauli | Paderborn |
| 13:00 UTC+2 | Muslija 8'; Bilbija 82' | FCSP Report; Kicker Report | Eggestein 48'; Irvine 78'; Dźwigała (yellow card) 90' | Stadium: Home Deluxe Arena; Attendance: 15,000; Referee: Martin Petersen (Stuttgart) |

| 28 October 2023 11 | FC St. Pauli | 2−1 | Karlsruher SC | Hamburg |
| 13:00 UTC+1 | Smith (yellow card) 67'; Eggestein 80'; Treu 90+2' | FCSP Report; Kicker Report | Schleusener (yellow card) 23'; Stindl (yellow card) 40'; Matanović 43' | Stadium: Millerntor-Stadion; Attendance: 29,125; Referee: Max Burda (Berlin) |

| 3 November 2023 12 | SV Elversberg | 0−2 | FC St. Pauli | Spiesen-Elversberg |
| 18:30 UTC+1 | Vandermersch (yellow card) 28'; Wanner (yellow card) 50' | FCSP Report; Kicker Report | Eggestein 16'; Hartel 31'; Irvine (yellow card) 53' | Stadium: Waldstadion an der Kaiserlinde; Attendance: 10,150; Referee: Alexander Sather (Grimma) |

| 10 November 2023 13 | FC St. Pauli | 0–0 | Hannover 96 | Hamburg |
| 18:30 UTC+1 | Saad (yellow card) 74'; Metcalfe (yellow card) 90' | FCSP Report; Kicker Report | Kunze (yellow card) 20'; Tresoldi (yellow card) 22'; Voglsammer (yellow card) 75'; Zieler (yellow card) 90+5' | Stadium: Millerntor-Stadion; Attendance: 29,546; Referee: Richard Hempel (Großnaundorf) |

| 25 November 2023 14 | FC Hansa Rostock | 2−3 | FC St. Pauli | Rostock |
| 13:00 UTC+1 | Brumado 9' (pen.), 80' (pen.), (yellow card) 39'; Hüsing (yellow card) 37' | FCSP Report; Kicker Report | Saliakas 15'; Hartel 18'; Afolayan 23'; Eggestein (yellow card) 90+7' | Stadium: Ostseestadion; Attendance: 27,100; Referee: Robin Braun (Wuppertal) |

| 1 December 2023 15 | FC St. Pauli | 2−2 | Hamburger SV | Hamburg |
| 18:30 UTC+1 | Irvine 15'; Heuer Fernandes 27' (o.g.); Wahl (yellow card) 64' | FCSP Report; Kicker Report | Ramos (yellow card) 29'; Meffert (yellow card) 44'; Glatzel 58'; Pherai 60'; Mikelbrencis (yellow card) 90+6' | Stadium: Millerntor-Stadion; Attendance: 29,153; Referee: Felix Zwayer (Berlin) |

| 9 December 2023 16 | VfL Osnabrück | 1−1 | FC St. Pauli | Osnabrück |
| 20:30 UTC+1 | Kleinhansl (yellow card) 45'; Wiemann (yellow card) 79' (yellow-red card) 90+4'; Makridis 82'; Wulff (yellow card) 90' | FCSP Report; Kicker Report | Irvine 6' | Stadium: Stadion an der Bremer Brücke; Attendance: 16,100; Referee: Patrick Schwengers (Travemünde) |

| 17 December 2023 17 | FC St. Pauli | 1−1 | Wehen Wiesbaden | Hamburg |
| 13:30 UTC+1 | Hartel 47'; Saliakas (yellow card) 51'; Saad (yellow card) 88' | FCSP Report; Kicker Report | Angha (yellow card) 20'; Bätzner (yellow card) 32'; Carstens (yellow card) 57'; Iredale 84' | Stadium: Millerntor-Stadion; Attendance: 29,332; Referee: Timo Gerach (Landau) |

| 20 January 2024 18 | FC St. Pauli | 2−0 | 1. FC Kaiserslautern | Hamburg |
| 13:00 UTC+1 | Saad 34'; Treu (yellow card) 43'; Wahl (yellow card) 50'; Hartel 64'; Smith (yellow card) 73' | FCSP Report; Kicker Report | Tomiak (yellow card) 55'; Ritter (yellow card) 73' | Stadium: Millerntor-Stadion; Attendance: 29,546; Referee: Tobias Welz (Wiesbaden) |

| 27 January 2024 19 | Fortuna Düsseldorf | 1−2 | FC St. Pauli | Düsseldorf |
| 20:30 UTC+1 | Tzolis (yellow card) 30', (goal) 83'; De Wijs (yellow card) 65' | FCSP Report; Kicker Report | Hartel 16' (pen.), 26'; Vasilj (yellow card) 32'; Kemlein (yellow card) 51'; Németh (yellow card) 90' | Stadium: Merkur Spiel-Arena; Attendance: 52,000; Referee: Frank Willenborg (Osnabrück) |

| 3 February 2024 20 | FC St. Pauli | 3−2 | SpVgg Greuther Fürth | Hamburg |
| 13:00 UTC+1 | Saad 30', 81'; Afolayan 33', (yellow card) 58' | FCSP Report; Kicker Report | Sieb 44'; Hrgota (yellow card) 52'; Asta 59'; Haddadi (yellow card) 74' | Stadium: Millerntor-Stadion; Attendance: 29,035; Referee: Florian Exner (Münster) |

| 10 February 2024 21 | 1. FC Magdeburg | 1−0 | FC St. Pauli | Magdeburg |
| 13:00 UTC+1 | Atik 72'; El Hankouri (yellow card) 75' | FCSP Report; Kicker Report | Kemlein (yellow card) 59'; Saliakas (yellow card) 75' | Stadium: MDCC-Arena; Attendance: 25,187; Referee: Max Burda (Berlin) |

| 18 February 2024 22 | FC St. Pauli | 1−0 | Eintracht Braunschweig | Hamburg |
| 13:30 UTC+1 | Afolayan 32'; Saad (yellow card) 39' (yellow-red card) 67'; Irvine (yellow card) 49' | FCSP Report; Kicker Report | Tauer (yellow card) 40'; Ujah (yellow card) 81' | Stadium: Millerntor-Stadion; Attendance: 29,546; Referee: Florian Heft (Neuenkirchen) |

| 23 February 2024 23 | Holstein Kiel | 3−4 | FC St. Pauli | Kiel |
| 18:30 UTC+1 | Schulz (yellow card) 45'; Machino 53'; Mees 65'; Bernhardsson 82' | FCSP Report; Kicker Report | Afolayan 11', 36'; Hartel 34'; Metcalfe 57'; Saliakas (yellow card) 90+4'; Hürzeler (yellow card) 90+5' | Stadium: Holstein-Stadion; Attendance: 15,034; Referee: Matthias Jöllenbeck (Freiburg im Breisgau) |

| 1 March 2024 24 | Schalke 04 | 3−1 | FC St. Pauli | Gelsenkirchen |
| 18:30 UTC+1 | Kabadayı 44', 73', (yellow card) 51'; Soppy (yellow card) 45+5'; Churlinov (yellow card) 79'; Karaman 90+2' | FCSP Report; Kicker Report | Saad 89' | Stadium: Veltins-Arena; Attendance: 61,497; Referee: Daniel Siebert (Berlin) |

| 10 March 2024 25 | FC St. Pauli | 2−0 | Hertha BSC | Hamburg |
| 13:30 UTC+1 | Saliakas 16', (yellow card) 42'; Hartel 44' | FCSP Report; Kicker Report | Kenny (yellow card) 29' | Stadium: Millerntor-Stadion; Attendance: 29,546; Referee: Harm Osmers (Hannover) |

| 16 March 2024 26 | 1. FC Nürnberg | 0−2 | FC St. Pauli | Nuremberg |
| 13:00 UTC+1 | | FCSP Report; Kicker Report | Eggestein 44'; Saad (yellow card) 47'; Hartel 62'; Dźwigała (yellow card) 72' | Stadium: Max-Morlock-Stadion; Attendance: 41,269; Referee: Frank Willenborg (Osnabrück) |

| 31 March 2024 27 | FC St. Pauli | 2−1 | SC Paderborn 07 | Hamburg |
| 13:30 UTC+2 | Metcalfe (yellow card) 30'; Hartel 32'; Ritzka 47'; Hürzeler (yellow card) 71'; Smith (yellow card) 72' | FCSP Report; Kicker Report | Grimaldi 56', (yellow card) 66' (yellow-red card) 72' | Stadium: Millerntor-Stadion; Attendance: 29,391; Referee: Benjamin Brand (Schwebheim) |

| 6 April 2024 28 | Karlsruher SC | 2−1 | FC St. Pauli | Karlsruhe |
| 20:30 UTC+2 | Franke 2', (yellow card) 18'; Nebel 69'; Gondorf (yellow card) 80'; Stindl (yellow card) 90+3'; Drewes (yellow card) 90+6' | FCSP Report; Kicker Report | Wahl (yellow card) 24' (yellow-red card) 77'; Irvine 37'; Hürzeler (yellow card) 74' | Stadium: BBBank Wildpark; Attendance: 33,000; Referee: Michael Bacher (Amerang) |

| 14 April 2024 29 | FC St. Pauli | 3−4 | SV Elversberg | Hamburg |
| 13:30 UTC+2 | Eggestein 39', (yellow card) 66'; Hartel 69'; Ritzka (yellow card) 78'; Smith (yellow card) 86'; Irvine (yellow card) 89', (goal) 90+2' | FCSP Report; Kicker Report | Feil (yellow card) 29'; Neubauer 52'; Boyamba 70'; Wanner 81', (yellow card) 86'; Vandermersch 83' | Stadium: Millerntor-Stadion; Attendance: 29,546; Referee: Tobias Reichel (Sindelfingen) |

| 21 April 2024 30 | Hannover 96 | 1−2 | FC St. Pauli | Hanover |
| 13:30 UTC+2 | Gindorf 45' | FCSP Report; Kicker Report | Afolayan 41', (yellow card) 59'; Eggestein 65'; Irvine (yellow card) 77'; Amenyido (yellow card) 90+3' | Stadium: Heinz von Heiden-Arena; Attendance: 49,000; Referee: Deniz Aytekin (Oberasbach) |

| 26 April 2024 31 | FC St. Pauli | 1−0 | FC Hansa Rostock | Hamburg |
| 18:30 UTC+2 | Irvine 52' | FCSP Report; Kicker Report | Perea (yellow card) 63'; Ingelsson (yellow card) 66'; Strauß (yellow card) 72'; Stafylidis (yellow card) 81' | Stadium: Millerntor-Stadion; Attendance: 29,163; Referee: Robert Hartmann (Wangen im Allgäu) |

| 3 May 2024 32 | Hamburger SV | 1−0 | FC St. Pauli | Hamburg |
| 18:30 UTC+2 | Muheim (yellow card) 39'; Meffert (yellow card) 66'; Glatzel 85'; Reis (penalty missed) 90+7' | FCSP Report; Kicker Report | Metcalfe (yellow card) 45+4'; Saliakas (yellow card) 79' (yellow-red card) 90+6' | Stadium: Volksparkstadion; Attendance: 57,000; Referee: Matthias Jöllenbeck (Freiburg im Breisgau) |

| 12 May 2024 33 | FC St. Pauli | 3−1 | VfL Osnabrück | Hamburg |
| 13:30 UTC+2 | Afolayan 7', 58'; Smith (yellow card) 15'; Hartel 68'; Dźwigała (yellow card) 90+1' | FCSP Report; Kicker Report | Kehl 90+1' (pen.) | Stadium: Millerntor-Stadion; Attendance: 29,546; Referee: Martin Petersen (Stuttgart) |

| 19 May 2024 34 | Wehen Wiesbaden | 1−2 | FC St. Pauli | Wiesbaden |
| 15:30 UTC+2 | Goppel (yellow card) 4'; Kovačević 10'; Döring (red card) 56' | FCSP Report; Kicker Report | Albers 51'; Sinani 82', (yellow card) 83'; Boukhalfa (yellow card) 90+4' | Stadium: BRITA-Arena; Attendance: 15,000; Referee: Deniz Aytekin (Oberasbach) |

=== DFB-Pokal ===
| 12 August 2023 First round | Atlas Delmenhorst | 0−5 | FC St. Pauli | Delmenhorst |
| 15:30 UTC+2 | Sari (yellow card) 39' (yellow-red card) 70'; Touray (yellow card) 61' | DFB Report; FCSP Report; Kicker Report | Smith 24'; Schobert 59' (o.g.); Saad 68'; Hartel 71' (pen.); Afolayan 88' | Stadium: Städtisches Stadion an der Düsternortstraße; Attendance: 4,999; Referee: Patrick Schwengers (Limburg an der Lahn) |

| 31 October 2023 Second round | FC St. Pauli | 2–1 (a.e.t.) | Schalke 04 | Hamburg |
| 18:00 UTC+1 | Hartel 57' (pen.), (yellow card) 113'; Amenyido (yellow card) 87'; Irvine (yellow card) 101'; Eggestein 102'; Hürzeler (yellow card) 114'; Saliakas (yellow card) 120+2' | DFB Report; FCSP Report; Kicker Report | Kamiński 16'; Schallenberg (yellow card) 45+3'; Matriciani (yellow card) 101'; Kabadayı (yellow card) 111' | Stadium: Millerntor-Stadion; Attendance: 28,589; Referee: Bastian Dankert (Rostock) |

| 5 December 2023 Round of 16 | FC 08 Homburg | 1−4 | FC St. Pauli | Homburg |
| 20:45 UTC+1 | Mendler 28'; Eisele (yellow card) 86' | DFB Report; FCSP Report; Kicker Report | Wahl 24'; Smith (yellow card) 27'; Ritzka (yellow card) 42'; Saad 64', (yellow card) 88'; Hartel 68'; Eggestein 73' | Stadium: Waldstadion Homburg; Attendance: 12,232; Referee: Martin Petersen (Stuttgart) |

| 30 January 2024 Quarter-finals | FC St. Pauli | 2−2 (a.e.t.) (3−4 p) | Fortuna Düsseldorf | Hamburg |
| 20:45 UTC+1 | Burchert (yellow card) 37'; Hartel 60' (pen.); Saliakas (yellow card) 82'; Mets (yellow card) 98'; Saad (yellow card) 117'; Hürzeler (yellow card) 51' (yellow-red card) 120'; Boukhalfa 120+1' | DFB Report; FCSP Report; Kicker Report | Vermeij 38' (pen.); Hoffmann (yellow card) 55'; Tanaka 99' | Stadium: Millerntor-Stadion; Attendance: 29,546; Referee: Sascha Stegemann (Niederkassel) |
| | Penalties |
| | Smith (penalty scored); Saad (penalty scored); Sinani (penalty scored); Maurides (penalty missed); Hartel (penalty missed) | | (penalty scored) Hoffmann; (penalty missed) Daferner; (penalty scored) Engelhardt; (penalty scored) Tanaka; (penalty scored) Tzolis |

== Squad and statistics ==
As of 19 May 2024

| No. | Pos | Player | 2. Bundesliga | | DFB-Pokal | | Total | |
| No. | Pos | Player | Apps | Goals | Apps | Goals | Apps | Goals |
|---|---|---|---|---|---|---|---|---|
| 2 | DF | (Greece) Manolis Saliakas | 31 | 2 | 1+3 | 0 | 35 | 2 |
| 3 | DF | (Estonia) Karol Mets | 32 | 0 | 4 | 0 | 36 | 0 |
| 4 | DF | (Austria) David Nemeth | 4+3 | 0 | 0+1 | 0 | 8 | 0 |
| 5 | DF | (Germany) Hauke Wahl | 32+1 | 0 | 4 | 1 | 37 | 1 |
| 6 | FW | (Germany) Simon Zoller | 0+4 | 0 | 1 | 0 | 5 | 0 |
| 7 | MF | (Australia) Jackson Irvine | 26+1 | 6 | 3 | 0 | 30 | 6 |
| 8 | DF | (Sweden) Eric Smith | 26 | 1 | 4 | 1 | 30 | 2 |
| 9 | FW | (Brazil) Maurides | 0+7 | 0 | 0+2 | 0 | 9 | 0 |
| 10 | MF | (Germany) Marcel Hartel | 33 | 17 | 4 | 4 | 37 | 21 |
| 11 | FW | (Germany) Johannes Eggestein | 27+2 | 9 | 2+2 | 2 | 33 | 11 |
| 14 | FW | (Togo) Etienne Amenyido | 0+18 | 1 | 2+1 | 0 | 21 | 1 |
| 15 | FW | (Luxembourg) Danel Sinani | 0+7 | 1 | 2+1 | 0 | 10 | 1 |
| 16 | MF | (Germany) Carlo Boukhalfa | 0+17 | 1 | 0+2 | 1 | 19 | 2 |
| 17 | FW | (England) Dapo Afolayan | 27+4 | 9 | 1+2 | 1 | 34 | 10 |
| 18 | FW | (Scotland) Scott Banks | 0+4 | 0 | 0 | 0 | 4 | 0 |
| 19 | FW | (Denmark) Andreas Albers | 3+13 | 1 | 1 | 0 | 17 | 1 |
| 20 | MF | (Sweden) Erik Ahlstrand | 0 | 0 | 0 | 0 | 0 | 0 |
| 21 | DF | (Germany) Lars Ritzka | 15+12 | 2 | 3 | 0 | 30 | 2 |
| 22 | GK | (Bosnia and Herzegovina) Nikola Vasilj | 34 | 0 | 0 | 0 | 34 | 0 |
| 23 | DF | (Germany) Philipp Treu | 17+9 | 1 | 4 | 0 | 30 | 1 |
| 24 | MF | (Australia) Connor Metcalfe | 21+9 | 3 | 1+2 | 0 | 33 | 3 |
| 25 | DF | (Poland) Adam Dźwigała | 7+10 | 0 | 0+2 | 0 | 19 | 0 |
| 26 | FW | (Tunisia) Elias Saad | 25+4 | 7 | 2+2 | 2 | 33 | 9 |
| 28 | GK | (Germany) Sören Ahlers | 0 | 0 | 0 | 0 | 0 | 0 |
| 29 | DF | (Germany) Luca Günther | 0 | 0 | 0 | 0 | 0 | 0 |
| 30 | GK | (Germany) Sascha Burchert | 0 | 0 | 4 | 0 | 4 | 0 |
| 32 | DF | (Germany) Tjark Scheller | 0+2 | 0 | 0 | 0 | 2 | 0 |
| 35 | FW | (Germany) Eric da Silva Moreira | 0+1 | 0 | 0 | 0 | 1 | 0 |
| 36 | MF | (Germany) Aljoscha Kemlein | 12+5 | 0 | 1 | 0 | 18 | 0 |
Players transferred or loaned out during the season
| 18 | DF | (Croatia) Jakov Medić | 1 | 0 | 0 | 0 | 1 | 0 |
