= 2024–25 FC St. Pauli season =

FC St. Pauli
2024–25 season
- Head coach: Alexander Blessin
- Stadium: Millerntor-Stadion
- Bundesliga: 14th
- DFB-Pokal: Second round
- Top goalscorer: League: Morgan Guilavogui (6); All: Morgan Guilavogui (7)
- Average home league attendance: 29,507
Home colours	Away colours	Third colours

The 2024–25 season was the 114th season in the history of St. Pauli, and their first season in the Bundesliga after an absence since 2010–11. In addition to the domestic league, the team participated in the DFB-Pokal.

== Transfers ==
=== In ===
Pos.	Player	Transferred from	Fee	Date	Source
GK	(Germany) Ben Voll	(Germany) Viktoria Köln	€100,000	6 June 2024	
MF	(Germany) Robert Wagner	(Germany) SC Freiburg	Loan	6 June 2024	
DF	(Germany) Muhammad Dahaba	(Germany) FC St. Pauli II	Professional contract	25 June 2024	
FW	(Scotland) Scott Banks	(England) Crystal Palace	€400,000	4 July 2024	
FW	(Guinea) Morgan Guilavogui	(France) RC Lens	Loan	26 July 2024	
DF	(Wales) Fin Stevens	(England) Brentford	€600,000	26 July 2024	
GK	(Germany) Eric Oelschlägel	(Netherlands) FC Emmen	Free transfer	23 October 2024	
MF	(United States) James Sands	(United States) New York City FC	Loan	1 January 2025	
FW	(Germany) Noah Weißhaupt	(Germany) SC Freiburg	Loan	2 January 2025	
FW	(The Gambia) Abdoulie Ceesay	(Estonia) Paide Linnameeskond	€450,000	3 January 2025	
MF	(Germany) Marwin Schmitz	(Germany) FC St. Pauli II	Professional contract	16 January 2025	
FW	(Germany) Romeo Aigbekaen	(Germany) FC St. Pauli II	Professional contract	29 January 2025	
DF	(Belgium) Siebe Van der Heyden	(Spain) Mallorca	Loan	30 January 2025	

=== Out ===
Pos.	Player	Transferred to	Fee	Date	Source
MF	(Germany) Marcel Hartel	(United States) St. Louis City SC	End of contract	23 May 2024	
FW	(Germany) Eric da Silva Moreira	(England) Nottingham Forest	€1,500,000	25 June 2024	
DF	(Germany) Luca Günther	(Germany) FC St. Pauli II	End of contract	30 June 2024	
DF	(Germany) Tjark Lasse Scheller	(Germany) SC Paderborn	End of contract	1 July 2024	
MF	(Germany) Aljoscha Kemlein	(Germany) 1. FC Union Berlin	Loan return	1 July 2024	
FW	(Germany) Etienne Amenyido	(Germany) Preußen Münster	End of contract	2 July 2024	
FW	(Brazil) Maurides	(Hungary) Debreceni VSC	Loan	29 January 2025	

== Friendlies ==
13 July 2024 Friendly	FC St. Pauli	3–1	Bremer SV	Malente
15:30	Eggestein 10'; Sinani 64'; Albers 86'	Report	Goguadze 25'	Stadium: Uwe-Seeler-Fußballpark A-Platz; Attendance: 1,200; Referee: Konrad Oldhafer (Hamburg)

19 July 2024 Friendly	Greuther Fürth	3–1	FC St. Pauli	Kufstein, Austria
18:00	Massimo 28'; Futkeu 45', 65'	Report	Dźwigała 79'; Afolayan (yellow card)	Stadium: Kufstein Arena; Referee: Cemil Et
Note: Four periods of 30 minutes

24 July 2024 Friendly	NK Slaven Belupo	v	FC St. Pauli
		Report

24 July 2024 Friendly	FC St. Pauli	1–0	Lyon	Schwaz, Austria
18:00 UTC+2	Schmitz 87'; Nemeth (yellow card)	Report		Stadium: Silberstadt Arena Schwaz; Attendance: 2,500

3 August 2024 Friendly	Norwich City	1–3	FC St. Pauli	Norwich, England
16:00 UTC+2	Rowe 47'; Duffy (yellow card) 79'	Report	Irvine 18'; Guilavogui 32'; Eggestein 39'	Stadium: Carrow Road; Attendance: 9.959; Referee: Dean Whitestone

9 August 2024 Friendly	FC St. Pauli	3–0	Atalanta	Hamburg
18:30 UTC+2	Eggestein 58'; Afolayan 68'; Boukhalfa 70'	Report		Stadium: Millerntor-Stadion; Attendance: 26,302; Referee: Harm Osmers (Hanover)

10 October 2024 Friendly	Hannover 96	3–2	FC St. Pauli	Hanover
12:00 UTC+2	Voglsammer 38', 49'; Momuluh 55'	Report	Banks 29', 51'; Schmitz (yellow card); Wagner (yellow card)	Stadium: Eilenriedestadion; Attendance: 0 Referee: Marius Schlüwe (Laatzen)

14 November 2024 Friendly	Eintracht Braunschweig	1–1	FC St. Pauli	Braunschweig
12:00 UTC+1	Philippe 74' (pen.)	Report	Albers 80'; Staugaard (yellow card)	Stadium: Eintracht-Stadion; Attendance: 0 Referee: Timon Schultz (Arpke)

5 January 2025 Friendly	Eintracht Braunschweig	2–1	FC St. Pauli	Braunschweig
16:30 UTC+1	Saliakas 30' (o.g.); Krauße 86'	Report	Aigbekaen 32'	Stadium: Eintracht-Stadion; Attendance: 0 Referee: Felix Bickel (Wolfsburg)

19 March 2025 Friendly	Hertha BSC	0–0	FC St. Pauli	Berlin
15:30 UTC+1		Report		Stadium: Stadion auf dem Wurfplatz; Attendance: 2,500; Referee: Eric Weisbach (Halle an der Saale)

== Competitions ==
=== Overall record ===
Competition	First match	Last match	Starting round	Final position	Record							
Competition	First match	Last match	Starting round	Final position	Pld	W	D	L	GF	GA	GD	Win %
Bundesliga	25 August 2024	17 May 2025	Matchday 1	14th	34	8	8	18	28	41	−13	23.53
DFB-Pokal	16 August 2024	29 October 2024	First round	Second round	2	1	0	1	5	6	−1	50.00
Total					36	9	8	19	33	47	−14	25.00

Last updated: 17 May 2025
Source: Soccerway

=== Bundesliga ===
==== League table ====
Pos	Team	Pld	W	D	L	GF	GA	GD	Pts	Qualification or relegation
12	FC Augsburg	34	11	10	13	35	51	−16	43	
13	Union Berlin	34	10	10	14	35	51	−16	40	
14	FC St. Pauli	34	8	8	18	28	41	−13	32	
15	TSG Hoffenheim	34	7	11	16	46	68	−22	32	
16	1. FC Heidenheim (O)	34	8	5	21	37	64	−27	29	Qualification for the relegation play-offs

Source: Bundesliga
Rules for classification: 1) Points; 2) Goal difference; 3) Goals scored; 4) Head-to-head results; 5) Head-to-head away goals scored; 6) Away goals scored; 7) Play-off.
(Rules 4–6 only apply after home and away matches have been played between the tied teams.)
(O) Play-off winners

==== Results summary ====
Overall								Home						Away					
Pld	W	D	L	GF	GA	GD	Pts	W	D	L	GF	GA	GD	W	D	L	GF	GA	GD
34	8	8	18	28	41	−13	32	3	5	9	10	19	−9	5	3	9	18	22	−4

Last updated: 17 May 2025.
Source: kicker.de

==== Results by round ====
Round	1	2	3	4	5	6	7	8	9	10	11	12	13	14	15	16	17	18	19	20	21	22	23	24	25	26	27	28	29	30	31	32	33	34
Ground	H	A	A	H	A	H	A	H	A	H	A	H	A	H	A	H	A	A	H	H	A	H	A	H	A	H	A	H	A	H	A	H	A	H
Result	L	L	L	D	W	L	L	D	W	L	L	W	L	L	W	L	L	W	W	D	L	L	L	L	D	W	L	D	W	D	D	L	D	L
Position	17	17	17	17	14	15	16	16	15	16	16	15	15	15	14	14	14	14	13	13	14	14	15	15	15	15	15	15	15	14	14	14	14	14

Updated to match(es) played on 17 May 2025. Source: Bundesliga Fixtures & Results
A = Away; H = Home; W = Win; D = Draw; L = Loss

==== Matches ====
The league schedule was released on 4 July 2024.

25 August 2024 1	FC St. Pauli	0–2	1. FC Heidenheim	Hamburg
17:30 UTC+2	Irvine (yellow card) 18'; Wagner (yellow card) 28'	FCSP Report; Kicker Report	Maloney (yellow card) 22'; Wanner 66'; Traoré (yellow card) 74'; Gimber (yellow card) 78'; Schöppner 82'	Stadium: Millerntor-Stadion; Attendance: 29,157; Referee: Sven Jablonski (Bremen)

30 August 2024 2	Union Berlin	1–0	FC St. Pauli	Berlin
20:30 UTC+2	Hollerbach 34', (yellow card) 76'; Querfeld (yellow card) 90+1'; Jeong (yellow card) 90+4'	FCSP Report; Kicker Report	Guilavogui (yellow card) 45+2'	Stadium: Stadion An der Alten Försterei; Attendance: 22,012; Referee: Bastian Dankert (Rostock)

14 September 2024 3	FC Augsburg	3–1	FC St. Pauli	Augsburg
15:30 UTC+2	Essende (yellow card) 39'; Wolf 47'; Rexhbecaj (yellow card) 58'; Giannoulis (yellow card) 62'; Tietz 67', (yellow card) 90+4'; Kabadayi 90+6'	FCSP Report; Kicker Report	Guilavogui (yellow card) 5'; Ritzka (yellow card) 22'; Boukhalfa 75'; Blessin (yellow card) 90'; Mets (yellow card) 90+4'	Stadium: WWK Arena; Attendance: 30,660; Referee: Felix Zwayer (Berlin)

22 September 2024 4	FC St. Pauli	0–0	RB Leipzig	Hamburg
19:30 UTC+2	Treu (yellow card) 29'; Saad (yellow card) 71'	FCSP Report; Kicker Report	Haidara (yellow card) 24'	Stadium: Millerntor-Stadion; Attendance: 29,251; Referee: Robert Hartmann (Wangen im Allgäu)

28 September 2024 5	SC Freiburg	0–3	FC St. Pauli	Freiburg
15:30 UTC+2	Ginter (yellow card) 34'; Grifo (penalty missed) 41'; Kübler (yellow card) 43'; Höfler (yellow card) 90+4'	FCSP Report; Kicker Report	Saad 12', 72'; Afolayan 45'; Eggestein (yellow card) 53'; Saliakas (yellow card) 62'; Banks (yellow card) 90+5'	Stadium: Europa-Park Stadion; Attendance: 34,700; Referee: Timo Gerach (Landau)

5 October 2024 6	FC St. Pauli	0–3	Mainz 05	Hamburg
15:30 UTC+2		FCSP Report; Kicker Report	Burkardt 5', 62'; Sieb 16', (yellow card) 20'; Jenz (yellow card) 79'; Kohr (yellow card) 88'	Stadium: Millerntor-Stadion; Attendance: 29,546; Referee: Christian Dingert (Lebecksmühle)

18 October 2024 7	Borussia Dortmund	2–1	FC St. Pauli	Dortmund
20:30 UTC+2	Bensebaini 43'; Gittens (yellow card) 75'; Brandt (yellow card) 77'; Guirassy 83'	FCSP Report; Kicker Report	Smith (yellow card) 40', (goal) 78'	Stadium: Signal Iduna Park; Attendance: 81,365; Referee: Matthias Jöllenbeck (Freiburg im Breisgau)

26 October 2024 8	FC St. Pauli	0–0	VfL Wolfsburg	Hamburg
15:30 UTC+2		FCSP Report; Kicker Report	Kamiński (yellow card) 76'; Mæhle (yellow card) 81'; Majer (yellow card) 90'	Stadium: Millerntor-Stadion; Attendance: 29,546; Referee: Tobias Reichel (Sindelfingen)

2 November 2024 9	TSG Hoffenheim	0–2	FC St. Pauli	Sinsheim
15:30 UTC+1		FCSP Report; Kicker Report	Afolayan 20'; Guilavogui (yellow card) 64'; Blessin (yellow card) 70'; Albers 90+3'	Stadium: PreZero Arena; Attendance: 26,199; Referee: Sascha Stegemann (Niederkassel)

9 November 2024 10	FC St. Pauli	0–1	Bayern Munich	Hamburg
15:30 UTC+1	Guilavogui (yellow card) 64'; Saliakas (yellow card) 67'; Blessin (yellow card) 68'	FCSP Report; Kicker Report	Musiala 22'; Kim (yellow card) 66'; Laimer (yellow card) 90+2'	Stadium: Millerntor-Stadion; Attendance: 29,546; Referee: Timo Gerach (Landau)

24 November 2024 11	Borussia Mönchengladbach	2–0	FC St. Pauli	Mönchengladbach
17:30 UTC+1	Pléa 13'; Kleindienst 44'; Ullrich (yellow card) 54'	FCSP Report; Kicker Report		Stadium: Borussia-Park; Attendance: 50,042; Referee: Robin Braun (Wuppertal)

29 November 2024 12	FC St. Pauli	3–1	Holstein Kiel	Hamburg
20:30 UTC+1	Saliakas 25'; Smith (yellow card) 38'; Guilavogui 56'; Eggestein 85'; Afolayan (yellow card) 86'	FCSP Report; Kicker Report	Holtby (yellow card) 23'; Machino (yellow card) 23'; Ivezić (yellow card) 27'; Becker (yellow card) 38'; Arp (penalty missed) 45'; Bremser (yellow card) 50'; Harres 90+1'; Erras (yellow card) 90+2'	Stadium: Millerntor-Stadion; Attendance: 29,546; Referee: Felix Zwayer (Berlin)

7 December 2024 13	Bayer Leverkusen	2–1	FC St. Pauli	Leverkusen
15:30 UTC+1	Wirtz 6'; Tah 21'; Hincapié (yellow card) 28'	FCSP Report; Kicker Report	Guilavogui (yellow card) 37', (goal) 84'; Saliakas (yellow card) 75'; Dźwigała (yellow card) 90+3'	Stadium: BayArena; Attendance: 30,210; Referee: Matthias Jöllenbeck (Freiburg im Breisgau)

14 December 2024 14	FC St. Pauli	0–2	Werder Bremen	Hamburg
18:30 UTC+1	Sinani (yellow card) 65'; Smith (yellow card) 67'	FCSP Report; Kicker Report	Stark (yellow card) 8'; Friedl (yellow card) 12'; Köhn 24'; Stage (yellow card) 43'; Ducksch 54'	Stadium: Millerntor-Stadion; Attendance: 29,546; Referee: Robert Hartmann (Wangen im Allgäu)

21 December 2024 15	VfB Stuttgart	0–1	FC St. Pauli	Stuttgart
15:30 UTC+1	Keitel (yellow card) 76'; Woltemade (yellow card) 90+4'	FCSP Report; Kicker Report	Eggestein 21', (yellow card) 45+1', (penalty missed) 53'; Sinani (yellow card) 83'	Stadium: MHPArena; Attendance: 60,058; Referee: Felix Brych (Munich)

11 January 2025 16	FC St. Pauli	0–1	Eintracht Frankfurt	Hamburg
15:30 UTC+1	Németh (yellow card) 27'	FCSP Report; Kicker Report	Koch (yellow card) 26'; Marmoush 32'; Collins (yellow card) 61'; Kristensen (yellow card) 90+5'	Stadium: Millerntor-Stadion; Attendance: 29,546; Referee: Harm Osmers (Hanover)

15 January 2025 17	VfL Bochum	1–0	FC St. Pauli	Bochum
18:30 UTC+1	Holtmann (yellow card) 42'; Hofmann 67'	FCSP Report; Kicker Report	Smith (yellow card) 69'; Irvine (yellow card) 72'; Afolayan (yellow card) 79'; Dźwigała (red card) 90+4'; Rashwan (yellow card) 90+5'	Stadium: Vonovia Ruhrstadion; Attendance: 26,000; Referee: Daniel Siebert (Berlin)

18 January 2025 18	1. FC Heidenheim	0–2	FC St. Pauli	Heidenheim
15:30 UTC+1	Kerber (yellow card) 84'	FCSP Report; Kicker Report	Eggestein 25' (pen.); Sands (yellow card) 38'; Smith (yellow card) 70'; Guilavogui 90+2'	Stadium: Voith-Arena; Attendance: 15,000; Referee: Bastian Dankert (Rostock)

26 January 2025 19	FC St. Pauli	3–0	Union Berlin	Hamburg
17:30 UTC+1	Guilavogui 31', 51'; Sinani 90+3'	FCSP Report; Kicker Report	Schäfer (yellow card) 35'; Bénes (yellow card) 50'; Querfeld (yellow card) 51'	Stadium: Millerntor-Stadion; Attendance: 29,546; Referee: Sören Storks (Velen)

1 February 2025 20	FC St. Pauli	1–1	FC Augsburg	Hamburg
15:30 UTC+1	Banks 17' (o.g.); Eggestein (yellow card) 67'	FCSP Report; Kicker Report	Giannoulis (yellow card) 60'; Banks (yellow card) 70'; Kömür 83'; Gumny (yellow card) 90+1'	Stadium: Millerntor-Stadion; Attendance: 29,546; Referee: Tobias Reichel (Sindelfingen)

9 February 2025 21	RB Leipzig	2–0	FC St. Pauli	Leipzig
17:30 UTC+1	Geertruida (yellow card) 1'; Šeško 16'; Simons 35'; Kampl (yellow card) 66'; Orbán (red card) 69'	FCSP Report; Kicker Report	Van der Heyden (yellow card) 11'; Dźwigała (yellow card) 58'	Stadium: Red Bull Arena; Attendance: 46,021; Referee: Florian Badstübner (Nürnberg)

15 February 2025 22	FC St. Pauli	0–1	SC Freiburg	Hamburg
15:30 UTC+1	Nemeth (yellow card) 63'	FCSP Report; Kicker Report	Grifo (penalty missed) 45+1'; Treu 88' (o.g.)	Stadium: Millerntor-Stadion; Attendance: 29,546; Referee: Benjamin Brandt (Schwebheim)

22 February 2025 23	Mainz 05	2–0	FC St. Pauli	Mainz
15:30 UTC+1	Sano (yellow card) 18'; Kohr (yellow card) 50'; Lee 67'; Nebel (yellow card) 87', (goal) 90+5'	FCSP Report; Kicker Report	Treu (yellow card) 24'; Van der Heyden (yellow card) 65'; Nemeth (yellow card) 90+4'	Stadium: Mewa Arena; Attendance: 33,305; Referee: Felix Zwayer (Berlin)

1 March 2025 24	FC St. Pauli	0–2	Borussia Dortmund	Hamburg
15:30 UTC+1	Ceesay (yellow card) 79'	FCSP Report; Kicker Report	Schlotterbeck (yellow card) 13'; Guirassy 50'; Adeyemi 58', (yellow card) 82'	Stadium: Millerntor-Stadion; Attendance: 29,564; Referee: Tobias Stieler (Sölden)

8 March 2025 25	VfL Wolfsburg	1–1	FC St. Pauli	Wolfsburg
15:30 UTC+1	Moura (yellow card) 46', (goal) 70' (pen.)	FCSP Report; Kicker Report	Van der Heyden 38'	Stadium: Volkswagen Arena; Attendance: 28,917; Referee: Robert Hartmann (Wangen im Allgäu)

14 March 2025 26	FC St. Pauli	1–0	TSG Hoffenheim	Hamburg
20:30 UTC+1	Weißhaupt 51'	FCSP Report; Kicker Report	Stach (yellow card) 55'	Stadium: Millerntor-Stadion; Attendance: 29,546; Referee: Felix Zwayer (Berlin)

29 March 2025 27	Bayern Munich	3–2	FC St. Pauli	Munich
15:30 UTC+1	Guerreiro (yellow card) 13'; Kane 17'; Olise (yellow card) 45+4'; Palhinha (yellow card) 51'; Sané 53', 71'	FCSP Report; Kicker Report	Saad 27'; Ritzka 90+3'	Stadium: Allianz Arena; Attendance: 75,000; Referee: Florian Badstübner (Nürnberg)

6 April 2025 28	FC St. Pauli	1–1	Borussia Mönchengladbach	Hamburg
15:30 UTC+2	Afolayan 85'	FCSP Report; Kicker Report	Itakura 45+2'; Ullrich (yellow card) 48'; Netz (yellow card) 76'	Stadium: Millerntor-Stadion; Attendance: 29,546; Referee: Christian Dingert (Lebecksmühle)

12 April 2025 29	Holstein Kiel	1–2	FC St. Pauli	Kiel
15:30 UTC+2	Bernhardsson 21'; Ivezić (yellow card) 60'; Harres (yellow card) 77'; Schulz (yellow card) 86'	FCSP Report; Kicker Report	Sinani 34'; Nemeth (yellow card) 38'; Afolayan (yellow card) 47'; Wahl (yellow card) 82'; Geschwill 90+2' (o.g.); Guilavogui (yellow card) 90+3'	Stadium: Holstein-Stadion; Attendance: 15,034; Referee: Benjamin Brand (Schwebheim)

20 April 2025 30	FC St. Pauli	1–1	Bayer Leverkusen	Hamburg
19:30 UTC+2	Boukhalfa 78'; Smith (yellow card) 90+1'	FCSP Report; Kicker Report	Schick 32'; Hincapié (yellow card) 63'; Hrádecký (yellow card) 64'; Frimpong (yellow card) 64'; Tella (yellow card) 77'	Stadium: Millerntor-Stadion; Attendance: 29,546; Referee: Sören Storks (Velen)

27 April 2025 31	Werder Bremen	0–0	FC St. Pauli	Bremen
17:30 UTC+2	Bittencourt (yellow card) 82'; Fried (yellow card) 90'	FCSP Report; Kicker Report	Saliakas (yellow card) 63'; Metcalfe (yellow card) 89' (yellow-red card) 90+2'	Stadium: Weserstadion; Attendance: 42,100; Referee: Tobias Reichel (Sindelfingen)

3 May 2025 32	FC St. Pauli	0–1	VfB Stuttgart	Hamburg
15:30 UTC+2	Van der Heyden (yellow card) 38' (yellow-red card) 57'; Boukhalfa (yellow card) 51'; Sinani (yellow card) 84'; Vasilj (yellow card) 90' (yellow-red card) 90+7'	FCSP Report; Kicker Report	Chabot (yellow card) 17'; Stiller (yellow card) 53'; Woltemade (penalty missed) 60', 88'; Undav (yellow card) 67'	Stadium: Millerntor-Stadion; Attendance: 29,546; Referee: Florian Exner (Münster)

11 May 2025 33	Eintracht Frankfurt	2–2	FC St. Pauli	Frankfurt
17:30 UTC+2	Kristensen 1', (yellow card) 90+4'; Batshuayi 71'; Theate (yellow card) 84'	FCSP Report; Kicker Report	Saliakas 4'; Guilavogui 16'; Smith (yellow card) 78'; Voll (yellow card) 90+4'	Stadium: Deutsche Bank Park; Attendance: 58,000; Referee: Christian Dingert (Lebecksmühle)

17 May 2025 34	FC St. Pauli	0–2	VfL Bochum	Hamburg
15:30 UTC+2		FCSP Report; Kicker Report	Boadu 10', 66'	Stadium: Millerntor-Stadion; Attendance: 29,546; Referee: Felix Zwayer (Berlin)

=== DFB-Pokal ===
16 August 2024 First round	Hallescher FC	2–3 (a.e.t.)	FC St. Pauli	Halle
18:00 UTC+2	Akono 11'; Kulke (yellow card) 59'; Hauptmann 62'; Halangk (yellow card) 90+1'; Löhmannsröben (yellow card) 101'; Landgraf (yellow card) 102'; Berger (yellow card) 109'; Vujanic (yellow card) 118'	DFB Report; FCSP Report; Kicker Report	Guilavogui (yellow card) 43'; Eggestein 48'; Irvine (yellow card) 68'; Dźwigała 90+4'; Boukhalfa (yellow card) 102'; Ritzka 110'; Mets (yellow card) 119'	Stadium: Leuna-Chemie-Stadion; Attendance: 14,000; Referee: Daniel Siebert (Berlin)

29 October 2024 Second round	RB Leipzig	4–2	FC St. Pauli	Leipzig
18:00 UTC+1	Poulsen 12', 30'; Baumgartner 17'; Nusa 80'	DFB Report; FCSP Report; Kicker Report	Guilavogui 28'; Saliakas (yellow card) 40'; Smith 58'	Stadium: Red Bull Arena; Attendance: 40,478; Referee: Felix Zwayer (Berlin)

== Squad and statistics ==
As of 17 May 2025

No.	Pos	Player	1. Bundesliga		DFB-Pokal		Total	
No.	Pos	Player	Apps	Goals	Apps	Goals	Apps	Goals
1	GK	(Germany) Ben Voll	1+1	0	0	0	2	0
2	DF	(Greece) Manolis Saliakas	26+4	2	1	0	31	2
3	DF	(Estonia) Karol Mets	10	0	2	0	12	0
4	DF	(Austria) David Nemeth	24	0	0	0	24	0
5	DF	(Germany) Hauke Wahl	33	0	2	0	35	0
6	MF	(United States) James Sands	5+2	0	0	0	7	0
7	MF	(Australia) Jackson Irvine	29	0	2	0	31	0
8	DF	(Sweden) Eric Smith	32	1	2	1	34	2
9	FW	(The Gambia) Abdoulie Ceesay	0+7	0	0	0	7	0
10	FW	(Luxembourg) Danel Sinani	13+12	2	0+1	0	26	2
11	FW	(Germany) Johannes Eggestein	22+5	3	2	1	29	4
13	FW	(Germany) Noah Weißhaupt	13+6	1	0	0	19	1
14	DF	(Wales) Fin Stevens	0+1	0	1	0	2	0
16	MF	(Germany) Carlo Boukhalfa	19+6	2	0+2	0	27	2
17	FW	(England) Dapo Afolayan	17+15	3	1+1	0	34	3
18	FW	(Scotland) Scott Banks	0+12	0	0	0	12	0
19	FW	(Denmark) Andreas Albers	0+14	1	0+1	0	15	1
20	MF	(Sweden) Erik Ahlstrand	0+5	0	0+1	0	6	0
21	DF	(Germany) Lars Ritzka	11+10	1	0+2	1	23	2
22	GK	(Bosnia and Herzegovina) Nikola Vasilj	33	0	2	0	35	0
23	DF	(Germany) Philipp Treu	33	0	2	0	35	0
24	MF	(Australia) Connor Metcalfe	3+7	0	1	0	11	0
25	DF	(Poland) Adam Dźwigała	2+14	0	0+1	1	17	1
26	FW	(Tunisia) Elias Saad	10+8	3	0+1	0	19	3
27	FW	(Germany) Simon Zoller	0	0	0	0	0	0
28	GK	(Germany) Sören Ahlers	0	0	0	0	0	0
29	FW	(Mali) Morgan Guilavogui	21+4	6	2	1	27	7
30	GK	(Germany) Sascha Burchert	0	0	0	0	0	0
32	GK	(Germany) Eric Oelschlägel	0	0	0	0	0	0
34	DF	(Germany) Muhammad Dahaba	0	0	0	0	0	0
38	FW	(Germany) Romeo Aigbekaen	0	0	0	0	0	0
39	MF	(Germany) Robert Wagner	5+7	0	2	0	14	0
42	MF	(Germany) Marwin Schmitz	0	0	0	0	0	0
44	DF	(Belgium) Siebe Van der Heyden	11+2	1	0	0	13	1
Players transferred or loaned out during the season
33	FW	(Brazil) Maurides	0+1	0	0	0	1	0
