= Muhammad Dahaba =

German footballer (born 2005)

Personal information
- Date of birth: 7 March 2005 (age 21)
- Place of birth: Hamburg, Germany
- Height: 1.94 m (6 ft 4 in)
- Position: Centre-back

Team information
- Current team: SV Drochtersen/Assel
- Number: 22

Youth career
- 2012–2024: FC St. Pauli

Senior career*
Years	Team	Apps	(Gls)
2023–2026	FC St. Pauli II	54	(0)
2026–	SV Drochtersen/Assel	5	(0)
- * Club domestic league appearances and goals as of 22 September 2026

Muhammad Dahaba (born 7 March 2005) is a German professional footballer who plays as a centre-back for SV Drochtersen/Assel.

== Club career ==
Born in Hamburg, Dahaba is a youth product of FC St. Pauli, having joined the club in 2012.

Dahaba started playing with St. Pauli second team during the 2023–24 season playing a total of 7 games in the Regionalliga Nord. That season he also regularly started training with the 2. Bundesliga team under Fabian Hürzeler's management.

In June 2024, he signed his first professional contract with St. Pauli.

Having played in the pre-season friendlies, Dahaba started the following season with the newly promoted to Bundesliga first team, while still playing in Regionalliga.

== Personal life ==
Muhammad Dahaba is the younger brother of Noah Dahaba, who also plays as a footballer in the Oberligas.

== Career statistics ==
As of match played 18 May 2025

Appearances and goals by club, season and competition
Club	Season	League			DFB-Pokal		Total	
Club	Season	Division	Apps	Goals	Apps	Goals	Apps	Goals
FC St. Pauli II	2023–24	Regionalliga Nord	7	0	–		7	0
FC St. Pauli II	2024–25	Regionalliga Nord	22	0	–		22	0
FC St. Pauli II	Total		29	0	–		29	0
Career total			29	0	–		29	0
