= 2022–23 FC St. Pauli season =

FC St. Pauli
2022–23 season
- President: Oke Göttlich
- Manager: Timo Schultz (until 6 December 2022); Fabian Hürzeler (since 6 December 2022)
- Stadium: Millerntor-Stadion
- 2. Bundesliga: 5th
- DFB-Pokal: Second round
- Top goalscorer: League: Lukas Daschner (9); All: Lukas Daschner (10)
Home colours	Away colours	Third colours
- All statistics correct as of 28 May 2023.

The 2022–23 FC St. Pauli season was the 112th season in the football club's history and 12th consecutive season in the second division of German football, the 2. Bundesliga and 30th overall. In addition to the domestic league, FC St. Pauli also were participating in this season's edition of the DFB-Pokal. This was the 60th season for FC St. Pauli in the Millerntor-Stadion, located in St. Pauli, Hamburg, Germany. The season covered a period from 1 July 2022 to 30 June 2023.

== Players ==
=== Squad information ===
As of 17 December 2022

Note: Flags indicate national team as defined under FIFA eligibility rules; some limited exceptions apply. Players may hold more than one non-FIFA nationality.

No.	Pos.	Nation	Player
1	GK	GER	Dennis Smarsch
2	DF	GRE	Manolis Saliakas
3	DF	EST	Karol Mets (on loan from FC Zürich)
4	DF	AUT	David Nemeth
6	DF	GER	Christopher Avevor
7	MF	AUS	Jackson Irvine (co-captain)
8	MF	SWE	Eric Smith
9	FW	BRA	Maurides
10	MF	GER	Marcel Hartel
11	FW	GER	Johannes Eggestein
13	MF	GER	Lukas Daschner
14	FW	TOG	Etienne Amenyido
15	DF	GER	Marcel Beifus
16	MF	GER	Carlo Boukhalfa
17	FW	ENG	Dapo Afolayan
18	DF	CRO	Jakov Medić

No.	Pos.	Nation	Player
19	DF	GER	Luca-Milan Zander
20	MF	NGR	Afeez Aremu
21	DF	GER	Lars Ritzka
22	GK	BIH	Nikola Vasilj
23	DF	KOS	Leart Paqarada (co-captain)
24	MF	AUS	Connor Metcalfe
26	FW	GER	Elias Saad
25	DF	POL	Adam Dźwigała
27	FW	GER	David Otto
28	GK	GER	Sören Ahlers
29	MF	GER	Niklas Jessen
30	GK	GER	Sascha Burchert
31	MF	GER	Franz Roggow
32	DF	GER	Jannes Wieckhoff
34	FW	GER	Igor Matanović

=== Transfers ===
==== Summer ====
In:

No.	Pos.	Nation	Player
2	DF	GRE	Manolis Saliakas (from PAS Giannina)
4	DF	AUT	David Nemeth (from 1. FSV Mainz 05)
5	DF	KOS	Betim Fazliji (from FC St. Gallen)
11	FW	GER	Johannes Eggestein (from Royal Antwerp)
16	MF	GER	Carlo Boukhalfa (from SC Freiburg)
24	MF	AUS	Connor Metcalfe (from Melbourne City)
27	FW	GER	David Otto (from SSV Jahn Regensburg)
29	MF	GER	Niklas Jessen (from FC St. Pauli II)
30	GK	GER	Sascha Burchert (from SpVgg Greuther Fürth)
30	FW	GER	Nathanael Kukanda (from FC St. Pauli II)

Out:

No.	Pos.	Nation	Player
2	DF	SWE	Sebastian Ohlsson (released)
3	DF	WAL	James Lawrence (released to 1. FC Nürnberg)
4	DF	GER	Philipp Ziereis (released to LASK)
9	FW	AUT	Guido Burgstaller (to SK Rapid Wien)
10	MF	GER	Christopher Buchtmann (released to VfB Oldenburg)
11	MF	GER	Maximilian Dittgen (released to FC Ingolstadt 04)
16	FW	DEN	Simon Makienok (released to AC Horsens)
17	MF	GER	Daniel-Kofi Kyereh (to SC Freiburg)
20	MF	GER	Finn Ole Becker (to TSG 1899 Hoffenheim)
26	MF	GER	Rico Benatelli (released to SK Austria Klagenfurt)
33	DF	GER	Marvin Senger (to MSV Duisburg, previously on loan at 1. FC Kaiserslautern)
—	MF	GER	Christian Viet (released to SSV Jahn Regensburg, previously on loan at Borussia Dortmund II)

==== Winter ====
In:

No.	Pos.	Nation	Player
3	DF	EST	Karol Mets (on loan from FC Zürich)
9	FW	BRA	Maurides (from Radomiak Radom)
17	FW	ENG	Dapo Afolayan (from Bolton Wanderers)
26	FW	GER	Elias Saad (from FC Eintracht Norderstedt 03)

Out:

No.	Pos.	Nation	Player

== Matches ==
Legend

Win Draw Loss

=== Friendly matches ===
19 June 2022 Friendly	MTV Hetlingen	0−13	FC St. Pauli	Hetlingen
15:00 UTC+2		Report	Daschner 11', 33'; Imsak 16'; Amenyido 18'; Nemeth 28', 38'; Roggow 44'; Medić 50'; Boukhalfa 56', 82'; Beifus 67'; Jessen 70'; Hartel 86'	Stadium: Deichstadion; Attendance: 3,000; Referee: Kevin Rosin (Lieth)

25 June 2022 Friendly	Holstein Kiel	2−0	FC St. Pauli	Kiel
13:30 UTC+2	Pichler 9'; Arp 67'	Report		Stadium: CITTI Fussball Park

1 July 2022 Friendly	Silkeborg IF	2−0	FC St. Pauli	Tønder, Denmark
14:00 UTC+2	Felix 74'; Klynge 81'	Report		Stadium: Bank Parken; Attendance: 700

9 July 2022 Friendly	NK Istra 1961	1−4	FC St. Pauli	St. Leonhard in Passeier, Austria
15:00 UTC+2	Mišković 49' (pen.)	Report	Medić 14'; Matanović 34'; Paqarada 60' (pen.); Imsak 89'	Stadium: Nestelstadion

21 December 2022 Friendly	1. FC Union Berlin	3−2	FC St. Pauli	Berlin
13:00 UTC+1	Pefok 42'; Skarke 67'; Behrens 86'	Report	Hartel 45' (pen.); Eggestein 57'	Stadium: Stadion An der Alten Försterei; Attendance: 969; Referee: Richard Hempel

7 January 2023 Friendly	FC St. Pauli	7−2	FC Lugano	Benidorm, Spain
14:00 UTC+1	Dźwigała 10', 52'; Daschner 11', 24'; Otto 20'; Eggestein 69'; Roggow 119'; Aremu (yellow card); Smith (yellow card)	Report	Aliseda 42'; Arigoni 48'; Espinoza (yellow card); Hajrizi (yellow card)	Stadium: Estadio Municipal Guillermo Amor
Note: The game was played in two halves of 60 minutes each.

14 January 2023 Friendly	Borussia Mönchengladbach	0−1	FC St. Pauli	Mönchengladbach
14:00 UTC+1		Report	Otto 24'; Hartel (yellow card)	Stadium: Borussia-Park; Attendance: 5,572; Referee: Robin Braun

21 January 2023 Friendly	FC St. Pauli	0–0	FC Midtjylland	Hamburg
13:30 UTC+1		Report	Musbaudeen (yellow card)	Stadium: Millerntor-Stadion; Attendance: 5,731; Referee: Konrad Oldhafer (Hamburg)

30 January 2023 Friendly	FC St. Pauli	0–4	VfB Oldenburg	Rotenburg an der Wümme
16:00 UTC+1		Report	Hasenhüttl 11'; Badjie 13'; Bookjans 43'; Brand 79'	Stadium: Stadion In der Ahe; Attendance: 200; Referee: Felix Bahr (Ahlerstedt)

24 March 2023 Friendly	FC St. Pauli	2−0	Hannover 96	Norderstedt
13:00 UTC+2	Zander 51'; Afolayan 87', (yellow card)	Report		Stadium: Edmund-Plambeck-Stadion; Referee: Felix Bickel (Wolfsburg)

=== 2. Bundesliga ===
==== League table ====
Pos	Team	Pld	W	D	L	GF	GA	GD	Pts	Promotion, qualification or relegation
3	Hamburger SV	34	20	6	8	70	45	+25	66	Qualification for promotion play-offs
4	Fortuna Düsseldorf	34	17	7	10	60	43	+17	58	
5	FC St. Pauli	34	16	10	8	55	39	+16	58	
6	SC Paderborn	34	16	7	11	68	44	+24	55	
7	Karlsruher SC	34	13	7	14	56	53	+3	46	

Source: DFB
Rules for classification: 1) Points; 2) Goal difference; 3) Goals scored; 4) Head-to-head results; 5) Head-to-head away goals scored; 6) Away goals scored; 7) Play-off.

==== Results summary ====
Overall								Home						Away					
Pld	W	D	L	GF	GA	GD	Pts	W	D	L	GF	GA	GD	W	D	L	GF	GA	GD
34	16	10	8	55	39	+16	58	9	7	1	24	11	+13	7	3	7	31	28	+3

Last updated: 28 May 2023.
Source: Kicker

==== Results by round ====
Round	1	2	3	4	5	6	7	8	9	10	11	12	13	14	15	16	17	18	19	20	21	22	23	24	25	26	27	28	29	30	31	32	33	34
Ground	H	A	A	H	A	H	A	H	A	H	A	H	A	H	A	H	A	A	H	H	A	H	A	H	A	H	A	H	A	H	A	H	A	H
Result	W	D	L	W	L	D	D	D	L	D	L	W	L	D	L	D	D	W	W	W	W	W	W	W	W	W	W	L	L	W	W	D	W	D
Position	4	4	12	7	11	11	10	10	12	11	14	12	12	13	16	15	15	10	9	9	8	7	7	7	5	4	4	5	5	5	4	5	4	5

Updated to match(es) played on 28 May 2023. Source: Kicker
A = Away; H = Home; W = Win; D = Draw; L = Loss

==== Results ====
16 July 2022 1	FC St. Pauli	3−2	1. FC Nürnberg	Hamburg
13:00 UTC+2	Irvine 24', (yellow card) 62'; Paqarada 37' (pen.); Daschner 39', (yellow card) 45'; Boukhalfa (yellow card) 74'	FCSP Report; Kicker Report	Tempelmann (yellow card) 36'; Nürnberger (yellow card) 45+1'; Duah 46'; Sørensen (yellow card) 64'; Vergers (yellow card) 76'; Wekesser (yellow card) 90+1'; Valentini 90+3'	Stadium: Millerntor-Stadion; Attendance: 28,582; Referee: Florian Heft (Neuenkirchen)

23 July 2022 2	Hannover 96	2−2	FC St. Pauli	Hanover
20:30 UTC+2	Kerk 33' (pen.); Dehm (yellow card) 53'; Köhn 71'	FCSP Report; Kicker Report	Eggestein 4'; Medić (yellow card) 18'; Smith (yellow card) 81'; Irvine (yellow card) 90', (goal) 90+5'	Stadium: Heinz von Heiden-Arena; Attendance: 33,600; Referee: Felix Zwayer (Berlin)

7 August 2022 3	1. FC Kaiserslautern	2−1	FC St. Pauli	Kaiserslautern
13:30 UTC+2	Boyd 9', (yellow card) 68'; Redondo 86'	FCSP Report; Kicker Report	Matanović (yellow card) 77'; Medić 88'	Stadium: Fritz-Walter-Stadion; Attendance: 39,579; Referee: Harm Osmers (Hanover)

14 August 2022 4	FC St. Pauli	3−0	1. FC Magdeburg	Hamburg
13:30 UTC+2	Eggestein 3', 14'; Paqarada (yellow card) 27'; Irvine (yellow card) 31'; Matanović (yellow card) 41'; Hartel 77'	FCSP Report; Kicker Report		Stadium: Millerntor-Stadion; Attendance: 29,164; Referee: Florian Badstübner (Nürnberg)

21 August 2022 5	FC Hansa Rostock	2−0	FC St. Pauli	Rostock
13:30 UTC+2	Pröger 4'; Verhoek 17'; Malone (yellow card) 24'; Roßbach (yellow card) 75'; Fröde (yellow card) 88'	FCSP Report; Kicker Report	Daschner (yellow card) 26'; Paqarada (yellow card) 90+1'	Stadium: Ostseestadion; Attendance: 26,000; Referee: Christian Dingert (Gries)

27 August 2022 6	FC St. Pauli	2−2	SC Paderborn 07	Hamburg
13:00 UTC+2	Otto (yellow card) 38'; Paqarada (penalty missed) 51'; Nemeth (yellow card) 72', (goal) 90+3'; Amenyido 83'	FCSP Report; Kicker Report	Pieringer 44'; Justavan (yellow card) 61'; Conteh 90+2'	Stadium: Millerntor-Stadion; Attendance: 29,269; Referee: Deniz Aytekin (Oberasbach)

3 September 2022 7	SpVgg Greuther Fürth	2−2	FC St. Pauli	Fürth
13:00 UTC+2	Hrgota 48'; Irvine 52' (o.g.); Christiansen (yellow card) 59'	FCSP Report; Kicker Report	Hartel 18'; Saliakas (yellow card) 27'; Otto (yellow card) 41'; Irvine (yellow card) 50'; Amenyido (yellow card) 63'; Paqarada (penalty missed) 72'; Metcalfe 85'; Boukhalfa (yellow card) 90+5'	Stadium: Sportpark Ronhof Thomas Sommer; Attendance: 10,553; Referee: Martin Petersen (Stuttgart)

11 September 2022 8	FC St. Pauli	1−1	SV Sandhausen	Hamburg
13:30 UTC+2	Irvine 38'	FCSP Report; Kicker Report	Papela (yellow card) 13'; Trybull (yellow card) 45+2'; Kinsombi 71'	Stadium: Millerntor-Stadion; Attendance: 29,546; Referee: Michael Bacher (Munich)

18 September 2022 9	Jahn Regensburg	2−0	FC St. Pauli	Regensburg
13:30 UTC+2	Thalhammer (yellow card) 2'; Albers 8' (pen.), 41'; Owusu (yellow card) 57'	FCSP Report; Kicker Report	Medić (yellow card) 32'; Daschner (yellow card) 52'; Irvine (yellow card) 67'; Metcalfe (yellow card) 76'; Hartel (yellow card) 77'	Stadium: Jahnstadion Regensburg; Attendance: 12,124; Referee: Nicolas Winter (Hagensbach)

1 October 2022 10	FC St. Pauli	0−0	1. FC Heidenheim	Hamburg
20:30 UTC+2	Smith (yellow card) 71'; Fazliji (yellow card) 90+3'	FCSP Report; Kicker Report	Geipl (yellow card) 23'; Maloney (yellow card) 55'; Beste (yellow card) 60'; Kühlwetter (yellow card) 65'; Kleindienst (yellow card) 75'	Stadium: Millerntor-Stadion; Attendance: 29,242; Referee: Sven Waschitzki-Günther (Bremen)

8 October 2022 11	Eintracht Braunschweig	2−1	FC St. Pauli	Braunschweig
13:00 UTC+2	Nikolaou (yellow card) 26'; Benković (yellow card) 37'; Krauße (yellow card) 51'; Pherai (yellow card) 72', (goal) 77', 90+4'; Marx (yellow card) 74'	FCSP Report; Kicker Report	Aremu (yellow card) 31'; Saliakas 68'	Stadium: Eintracht-Stadion; Attendance: 21,100; Referee: Sascha Stegemann (Niederkassel)

14 October 2022 12	FC St. Pauli	3−0	Hamburger SV	Hamburg
18:30 UTC+2	Medić (yellow card) 33'; Smith 61'; Vasilj (yellow card) 70'; Hartel 74'; Saliakas (yellow card) 80'; Otto 89'	FCSP Report; Kicker Report	Schonlau (red card) 28'; Heuer Fernandes (yellow card) 70'	Stadium: Millerntor-Stadion; Attendance: 29,205; Referee: Deniz Aytekin (Oberasbacj)

22 October 2022 13	Arminia Bielefeld	2−0	FC St. Pauli	Bielefeld
20:30 UTC+2	Lepinjica (yellow card) 17'; Serra 76', 84'	FCSP Report; Kicker Report	Irvine (yellow card) 86'; Smith (yellow card) 90+2'	Stadium: Schüco-Arena; Attendance: 22,626; Referee: Benjamin Cortus (Röthenbach an der Pegnitz)

29 October 2022 14	FC St. Pauli	1−1	SV Darmstadt 98	Hamburg
20:30 UTC+1	Fazliji (yellow card) 49'; Saliakas (yellow card) 65'; Aremu (yellow card) 67'; Daschner 69'	FCSP Report; Kicker Report	Mehlem (yellow card) 34'; Ronstadt 60'	Stadium: Millerntor-Stadion; Attendance: 29,546; Referee: Bastian Dankert (Rostock)

5 November 2022 15	Fortuna Düsseldorf	1−0	FC St. Pauli	Düsseldorf
13:00 UTC+1	Hennings 22', (yellow card) 66'; Klarer (yellow card) 59'	FCSP Report; Kicker Report	Fazliji (red card) 58'; Metcalfe (yellow card) 75'	Stadium: Merkur Spiel-Arena; Attendance: 36,430; Referee: Frank Willenborg (Osnabrück)

8 November 2022 16	FC St. Pauli	0−0	Holstein Kiel	Hamburg
18:30 UTC+1	Aremu (yellow card) 73'; Beifus (yellow card) 90+1'	FCSP Report; Kicker Report		Stadium: Millerntor-Stadion; Attendance: 29,546; Referee: Alexander Sather (Grimma)

12 November 2022 17	Karlsruher SC	4−4	FC St. Pauli	Karlsruhe
13:00 UTC+2	Schleusener 12', 31'; Wanitzek 16'; Kaufmann 50'; Franke (yellow card) 88'	FCSP Report; Kicker Report	Eggestein 24', 35'; Smith 43'; Dźwigała (yellow card) 58'; Daschner 61'	Stadium: BBBank Wildpark; Attendance: 21,487; Referee: Florian Lechner (Hornstorf)

29 January 2023 18	1. FC Nürnberg	0−1	FC St. Pauli	Nuremberg
13:30 UTC+1	Nischalke (yellow card) 86'; Weinzierl (yellow card) 90'	FCSP Report; Kicker Report	Saliakas (yellow card) 26'; Medić 33'; Vasilj (yellow card) 86'	Stadium: Max-Morlock-Stadion; Attendance: 30,871; Referee: Alexander Sather (Grimma)

5 February 2023 19	FC St. Pauli	2−0	Hannover 96	Hamburg
13:30 UTC+1	Mets (yellow card) 16'; Daschner 17'; Metcalfe 29'	FCSP Report; Kicker Report	Neumann (yellow card) 45' (yellow-red card) 61'; Ernst (yellow card) 71'	Stadium: Millerntor-Stadion; Attendance: 29,546; Referee: Timo Gerach (Landau)

12 February 2023 20	FC St. Pauli	1−0	1. FC Kaiserslautern	Hamburg
13:30 UTC+1	Smith (yellow card) 26'; Saliakas (yellow card) 54'; Metcalfe 72'; Afolayan (yellow card) 86'; Matanović (yellow card) 88'; Maurides (yellow card) 89'	FCSP Report; Kicker Report	Rapp (yellow card) 20'; Opoku (yellow card) 50'; Kraus (yellow card) 55'; Zolinski (yellow card) 69'; Durm (yellow card) 83'; Ritter (yellow card) 90+5'	Stadium: Millerntor-Stadion; Attendance: 29,546; Referee: Martin Petersen (Stuttgart)

18 February 2023 21	1. FC Magdeburg	1−2	FC St. Pauli	Magdeburg
13:00 UTC+1	Atik 39'; Kwarteng (yellow card) 87'; Sechelmann (yellow card) 90+2'	FCSP Report; Kicker Report	Irvine 74'; Paqarada (yellow card) 84'; Medić 88'	Stadium: MDCC-Arena; Attendance: 24,287; Referee: Patrick Alt (Illingen)

26 February 2023 22	FC St. Pauli	1−0	FC Hansa Rostock	Hamburg
13:30 UTC+1	Irvine 26'; Mets (yellow card) 63'; Saliakas (yellow card) 90+2'	FCSP Report; Kicker Report	Schumacher (yellow card) 60'; Verhoek (yellow card) 63'; Dressel (yellow card) 71'; Ingelsson (yellow card) 80'; Van Drongelen (yellow card) 90+3'	Stadium: Millerntor-Stadion; Attendance: 26,205; Referee: Benjamin Brand (Unterspiesheim)

3 March 2023 23	SC Paderborn 07	1−2	FC St. Pauli	Paderborn
18:30 UTC+1	Mets 51' (o.g.); Nadj (yellow card) 66'; Muslija (yellow card) 75'; Conteh (yellow card) 75' (yellow-red card) 76'	FCSP Report; Kicker Report	Daschner 15', 42'; Irvine (yellow card) 45'; Vasilj (yellow card) 84'	Stadium: Home Deluxe Arena; Attendance: 15,000; Referee: Arne Aarnink (Nordhorn)

11 March 2023 24	FC St. Pauli	2−1	SpVgg Greuther Fürth	Hamburg
13:00 UTC+1	Saliakas 13'; Afolayan 55', (yellow card) 62'; Medić (yellow card) 68'; Maurides (yellow card) 80'; Irvine (yellow card) 89'	FCSP Report; Kicker Report	Ache 6'; Griesbeck (yellow card) 78'; Jung (red card) 45'	Stadium: Millerntor-Stadion; Attendance: 29,346; Referee: Felix Zwayer (Berlin)

19 March 2023 25	SV Sandhausen	0−5	FC St. Pauli	Sandhausen
13:30 UTC+1	Kutucu (yellow card) 28'; Höhn (yellow card) 35'; Esswein (red card) 45+1'	FCSP Report; Kicker Report	Saliakas 19'; Daschner 24'; Afolayan 25'; Irvine 45+3', 88'	Stadium: BWT-Stadion am Hardtwald; Attendance: 7,642; Referee: Deniz Aytekin (Oberasbach)

1 April 2023 26	FC St. Pauli	1−0	Jahn Regensburg	Hamburg
13:00 UTC+2	Owusu 23' (o.g.); Saliakas (yellow card) 84'; Daschner (yellow card) 90+3'	FCSP Report; Kicker Report	Singh (yellow card) 10'; Owusu (yellow card) 11'; Breitkreuz (yellow card) 22'; Elvedi (yellow card) 90+5'	Stadium: Millerntor-Stadion; Attendance: 29,235; Referee: Bastian Dankert (Rostock)

8 April 2023 27	1. FC Heidenheim	0−1	FC St. Pauli	Heidenheim an der Brenz
20:30 UTC+2	Busch (yellow card) 61'; Kleindienst (yellow card) 81'	FCSP Report; Kicker Report	Metcalfe (yellow card) 32'; Hartel 41'; Otto (yellow card) 90+3'	Stadium: Voith-Arena; Attendance: 15,000; Referee: Christian Dingert (Gries)

16 April 2023 28	FC St. Pauli	1−2	Eintracht Braunschweig	Hamburg
13:30 UTC+2	Medić 85'; Saad (yellow card) 87'	FCSP Report; Kicker Report	Multhaup 1'; Wintzheimer 25'; Henning (yellow card) 52'; Donkor (yellow card) 90+1'	Stadium: Millerntor-Stadion; Attendance: 29,546; Referee: Robert Hartmann (Wangen im Allgäu)

21 April 2023 29	Hamburger SV	4−3	FC St. Pauli	Hamburg
18:30 UTC+2	David (yellow card) 24', (goal) 44'; Heyer (yellow card) 26', (goal) 52'; Schonlau (yellow card) 43'; Jatta 48'; Medić 78' (o.g.); Meffert (yellow card) 85'	FCSP Report; Kicker Report	Saliakas 36'; Paqarada (yellow card) 48'; Afolayan (yellow card) 55'; Smith (yellow card) 64'; Saad 71'; Irvine 79'	Stadium: Volksparkstadion; Attendance: 56,400; Referee: Sven Jablonski (Bremen)

29 April 2023 30	FC St. Pauli	2−1	Arminia Bielefeld	Hamburg
13:00 UTC+2	Saad (yellow card) 20'; Hartel 53'; Daschner 69'; Metcalfe (yellow card) 74'	FCSP Report; Kicker Report	Ramos (yellow card) 16'; Andrade (yellow card) 33'; Klos (yellow card) 70'; Consbruch 73'	Stadium: Millerntor-Stadion; Attendance: 29,546; Referee: Max Burda (Berlin)

6 May 2023 31	SV Darmstadt 98	0−3	FC St. Pauli	Darmstadt
20:30 UTC+2	Mehlem (yellow card) 74'; Seydel (yellow card) 90+3'	FCSP Report; Kicker Report	Dźwigała 45'; Saad 57'; Otto 84'; Beifus (yellow card) 90+6'	Stadium: Merck-Stadion am Böllenfalltor; Attendance: 17,650; Referee: Tobias Reichel (Stuttgart)

13 May 2023 32	FC St. Pauli	0−0	Fortuna Düsseldorf	Hamburg
20:30 UTC+2	Mets (yellow card) 39'	FCSP Report; Kicker Report	Hoffmann (yellow card) 53'; Ginczek (yellow card) 60'; Zimmermann (yellow card) 76'; Klarer (yellow card) 81'	Stadium: Millerntor-Stadion; Attendance: 29,546; Referee: Matthias Jöllenbeck (Freiburg im Breisgau)

19 May 2023 33	Holstein Kiel	3−4	FC St. Pauli	Kiel
18:30 UTC+2	Skrzybski 28' (pen.); Becker (yellow card) 45+2'; Bartels (yellow card) 65'; Komenda 78'; Rapp (yellow card) 90'; Reese 90+3'; Pichler (yellow card) 90+5'; Wahl (yellow card) 90+9'	FCSP Report; Kicker Report	Afolayan 39', (yellow card) 77' (yellow-red card) 88'; Wahl 53' (o.g.); Daschner 61'; Paqarada 74'; Hürzeler (yellow card) 88'	Stadium: Holstein-Stadion; Attendance: 15,034; Referee: Robert Kampka (Mainz)

28 May 2023 34	FC St. Pauli	1−1	Karlsruher SC	Hamburg
15:30 UTC+2	Mets (yellow card) 44'; Paqarada 58'; Zander (yellow card) 77'; Ritzka (yellow card) 90+1'	FCSP Report; Kicker Report	Cueto (yellow card) 39'; Schleusener 45+2'; Nebel (yellow card) 73'; Kobald (yellow card) 78'	Stadium: Millerntor-Stadion; Attendance: 29,546; Referee: Patrick Alt (Illingen)

=== DFB-Pokal ===
30 July 2022 First round	SV 19 Straelen	3−4	FC St. Pauli	Duisburg (Note: The SV Straelen v FC St. Pauli match will take place at the MSV-Arena instead of SV Straelen's home stadium.)
13:00 UTC+2	Vicario 19', 80'; Nshimirimana 42'; Harouz (yellow card) 45+1'; N'Diaye (yellow card) 82'; Cirillo (yellow card) 84'	FCSP Report; Kicker Report	Smith 25'; Medić 40', 90+1'; Otto 62'; Saliakas (red card) 77'	Stadium: MSV-Arena; Attendance: 5,874; Referee: Tom Bauer (Mainz)

19 October 2022 Second round	SC Freiburg	2−1 (a.e.t.)	FC St. Pauli	Freiburg im Breisgau
18:00 UTC+2	Kübler (yellow card) 79'; Ginter 90+3'; Gregoritsch 119'	FCSP Report; Kicker Report	Fazliji (yellow card) 41'; Daschner 42', (yellow card) 79'; Paqarada (yellow card) 44'; Aremu (yellow card) 79'; Wieckhoff (yellow card) 98'; Irvine (yellow card) 103'; Dźwigała (yellow card) 120+2'	Stadium: Europa-Park Stadion; Attendance: 33,000; Referee: Felix Brych (Munich)

== Squad and statistics ==
As of 28 May 2023

No.	Pos	Player	2. Bundesliga		DFB-Pokal		Total	
No.	Pos	Player	Apps	Goals	Apps	Goals	Apps	Goals
1	GK	(Germany) Dennis Smarsch	6	0	1	0	7	0
2	DF	(Greece) Manolis Saliakas	33	4	1	0	34	4
3	DF	(Estonia) Karol Mets	17	0	0	0	17	0
4	DF	(Austria) David Nemeth	8	1	0	0	8	1
5	DF	(Kosovo) Betim Fazliji	6+13	0	2	0	21	0
6	MF	(Germany) Christopher Avevor	0	0	0	0	0	0
7	MF	(Australia) Jackson Irvine	33	8	2	0	35	8
8	MF	(Sweden) Eric Smith	26	2	2	1	28	3
9	FW	(Brazil) Maurides	0+7	0	0	0	7	0
10	MF	(Germany) Marcel Hartel	34	5	2	0	36	5
11	FW	(Germany) Johannes Eggestein	12+9	5	1+1	0	23	5
13	MF	(Germany) Lukas Daschner	30+4	9	2	1	36	10
14	FW	(Togo) Etienne Amenyido	8+5	1	1	0	14	1
15	DF	(Germany) Marcel Beifus	2+7	0	0+1	0	10	0
16	MF	(Germany) Carlo Boukhalfa	2+7	0	0+1	0	10	0
17	FW	(England) Dapo Afolayan	15+1	3	0	0	16	3
18	DF	(Croatia) Jakov Medić	29	4	1	2	30	6
19	DF	(Germany) Luca-Milan Zander	0+20	0	0+1	0	21	0
20	MF	(Nigeria) Afeez Aremu	9+8	0	1	0	18	0
21	DF	(Germany) Lars Ritzka	2+8	0	0	0	10	0
22	GK	(Bosnia and Herzegovina) Nikola Vasilj	28	0	1	0	29	0
23	DF	(Kosovo) Leart Paqarada	32	3	2	0	34	3
24	MF	(Australia) Connor Metcalfe	13+17	3	1	0	31	3
25	DF	(Poland) Adam Dźwigała	13+6	1	1+1	0	21	1
26	FW	(Germany) Elias Saad	5+2	2	0	0	7	2
27	FW	(Germany) David Otto	4+23	2	0+2	1	29	3
28	GK	(Germany) Sören Ahlers	0	0	0	0	0	0
29	MF	(Germany) Niklas Jessen	0	0	0	0	0	0
30	GK	(Germany) Sascha Burchert	0	0	0	0	0	0
31	MF	(Germany) Franz Roggow	0	0	0	0	0	0
32	DF	(Germany) Jannes Wieckhoff	1	0	0+1	0	2	0
34	FW	(Germany) Igor Matanović	6+12	0	1+1	0	20	0
Players transferred or loaned out during the season
