= Elias Saad =

German-Tunisian footballer (born 1999)

- Saad with Nashville SC in 2026

Personal information
- Date of birth: 27 December 1999 (age 26)
- Place of birth: Hamburg, Germany
- Height: 1.85 m (6 ft 1 in)
- Position: Left winger

Team information
- Current team: Nashville SC (on loan from FC Augsburg)
- Number: 11

Youth career
- 2017–2018: Buxtehuder SV

Senior career*
Years	Team	Apps	(Gls)
2019–2021	HSV Barmbek-Uhlenhorst	30	(13)
2021–2022	Eintracht Norderstedt	38	(18)
2023–2024	FC St. Pauli II	4	(3)
2023–2025	FC St. Pauli	55	(12)
2025–	FC Augsburg	10	(0)
2026	→ Hannover 96 (loan)	13	(0)
2026–	→ Nashville SC (loan)	2	(0)

International career^{‡}
2019	Germany (Futsal)	5	(1)
2024–	Tunisia	17	(4)
- * Club domestic league appearances and goals as of 22:02, 16 August 2026 (UTC) ‡ National team caps and goals as of 21 June 2026

Elias Saad (Arabic: إِلْيَاس سَعْد; born 27 December 1999) is a professional footballer who plays as a left winger for Major League Soccer club Nashville SC, on loan from Bundesliga club FC Augsburg. Born in Germany, he plays for the Tunisia national team, having previously been a former international for the Germany national futsal team.

== Club career ==
From Wilhelmsburg, Hamburg, in 2017 Saad played under-19 football for Buxtehuder SV. In 2019 he joined Futsal Bundesliga team Hamburg Panthers and became the youngest player to make an appearance for the Germany national futsal team. He also played football for HSV Barmbek-Uhlenhorst in the fifth-tier Oberliga Hamburg, making 29 appearances in which he scored eleven goals and was credited with seven assists. Whilst playing amateur football in Hamburg Saad also trained as a wholesale and retail salesman. In March 2021 Saad agreed to join Regionalliga Nord side FC Eintracht Norderstedt 03, signing a two-year contract.

On 1 December 2022, Saad was announced as a signing for 2. Bundesliga side FC St. Pauli. He made his debut in the 2. Bundesliga for St. Pauli as a substitute against Eintracht Braunschweig on 16 April 2023. He scored his first league goal for the club the following week in the derby game against Hamburger SV. The following week he made his first league start for St. Pauli, at home against Arminia Bielefeld on 30 April 2023.

On 26 June 2025, Saad signed a four-year contract with FC Augsburg. On 14 January 2026, he was loaned by Hannover 96 in 2. Bundesliga. Then, on 16 July 2026, he was loaned by Major League Soccer club Nashville SC.

== International career ==
In August 2023 Saad received his first call-up to the Tunisia national team.

He made his debut on 26 March 2024 in a friendly against New Zealand.

On 15 May 2026, Saad was named in the Tunisia squad for the 2026 FIFA World Cup.

== Personal life ==
Born in Germany, Saad is of Tunisian descent.

== Career statistics ==
=== Club ===
As of match played 18 May 2026

Appearances and goals by club, season and competition
Club	Season	League			DFB-Pokal		Total	
Club	Season	Division	Apps	Goals	Apps	Goals	Apps	Goals
HSV Barmbek-Uhlenhorst	2019–20	Oberliga Hamburg	24	10	–		24	1
HSV Barmbek-Uhlenhorst	2020–21	Oberliga Hamburg	6	3	–		6	3
HSV Barmbek-Uhlenhorst	Total		30	13	–		30	13
Eintracht Norderstedt	2021–22	Regionalliga Nord North group	21	8	1	0	22	8
Eintracht Norderstedt	2022–23	Regionalliga Nord	17	10	–		17	10
Eintracht Norderstedt	Total		38	18	1	0	39	18
FC St. Pauli II	2022–23	Regionalliga Nord	4	3	–		4	3
FC St. Pauli	2022–23	2. Bundesliga	7	2	0	0	7	2
FC St. Pauli	2023–24	2. Bundesliga	30	7	4	2	34	9
FC St. Pauli	2024–25	Bundesliga	18	3	1	0	19	3
FC St. Pauli	Total		55	12	5	2	60	14
FC Augsburg	2025–26	Bundesliga	10	0	1	0	11	0
Hannover 96 (loan)	2025–26	2. Bundesliga	13	0	0	0	13	0
Career total			150	46	7	2	157	48

=== International ===
List of international goals scored by Elias Saad
No.	Date	Venue	Opponent	Score	Result	Competition
1	4 September 2025	Hammadi Agrebi Stadium, Tunis, Tunisia	Liberia	3–0	3–0	2026 FIFA World Cup qualification
2	10 October 2025	Hammadi Agrebi Stadium, Tunis, Tunisia	São Tomé and Príncipe	2–0	6–0	2026 FIFA World Cup qualification
3	10 October 2025	Hammadi Agrebi Stadium, Tunis, Tunisia	São Tomé and Príncipe	3–0	6–0	2026 FIFA World Cup qualification
4	14 November 2025	Hammadi Agrebi Stadium, Tunis, Tunisia	Jordan	3–2	3–2	Friendly

== Honours ==
FC St. Pauli

- 2. Bundesliga: 2023–24
