= Aljoscha Kemlein =

German footballer (born 2000)

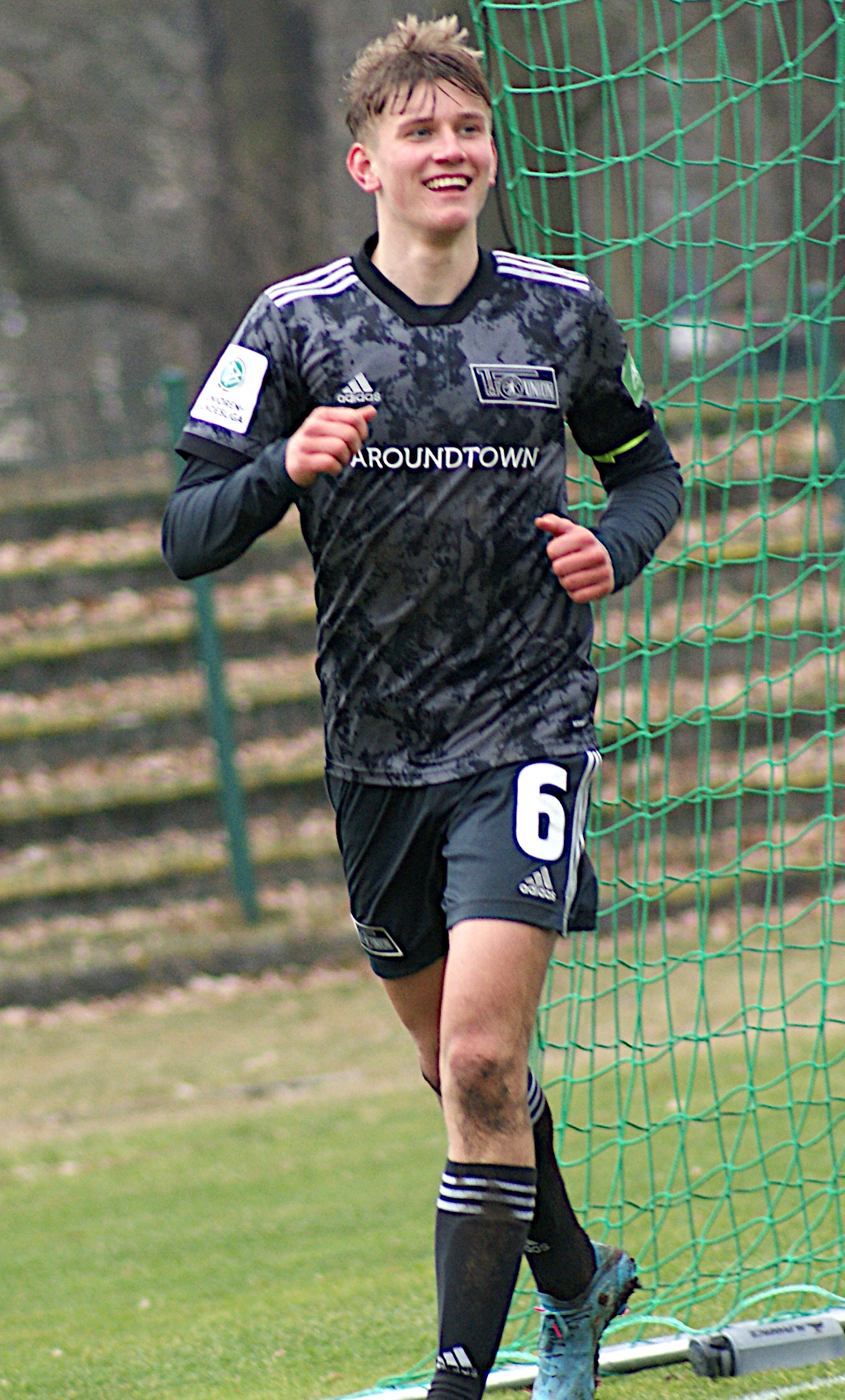
- Kemlein in 2022

Personal information
- Date of birth: 2 August 2004 (age 22)
- Place of birth: Berlin, Germany
- Height: 1.85 m (6 ft 1 in)
- Position: Defensive midfielder

Team information
- Current team: Union Berlin
- Number: 6

Youth career
- 2015–2016: SC Berliner Amateure
- 2016–2023: Union Berlin

Senior career*
Years	Team	Apps	(Gls)
2023–	Union Berlin	55	(1)
2024	→ FC St. Pauli (loan)	17	(0)

International career^{‡}
2022	Germany U18	1	(0)
2022–2023	Germany U19	3	(0)
2023–2024	Germany U20	12	(0)
2024–	Germany U21	11	(0)
- * Club domestic league appearances and goals as of 17:30, 1 November 2026 (UTC) ‡ National team caps and goals as of 18:40, 6 October 2026 (UTC)

Aljoscha Kemlein (born 2 August 2004) is a German professional footballer who plays as a defensive midfielder for Bundesliga club Union Berlin.

== Club career ==
Kemlein is a product of the youth academy of SC Berliner and Union Berlin. On 1 September 2022, he signed his first professional contract with Union Berlin. He made his senior and professional debut with Union Berlin as a late substitute in a 4–1 Bundesliga win over Mainz on 20 August 2023.

On 7 January 2024, Union Berlin sent Kemlein on loan to 2. Bundesliga club FC St. Pauli until the end of the season.

== International career ==
Kemlein is a youth international for Germany, having played up to the Germany U19s.

== Career statistics ==
As of match played 1 November 2026

Appearances and goals by club, season and competition
Club	Season	League			National cup		Europe		Other		Total	
Club	Season	Division	Apps	Goals	Apps	Goals	Apps	Goals	Apps	Goals	Apps	Goals
Union Berlin	2023–24	Bundesliga	2	0	0	0	1 (Note: Appearance(s) in the UEFA Champions League)	0	—		3	0
Union Berlin	2024–25	Bundesliga	15	1	2	0	—		—		17	1
Union Berlin	2025–26	Bundesliga	30	0	1	0	—		—		31	0
Union Berlin	2026–27	Bundesliga	8	0	2	0	—		—		10	0
Union Berlin	Total		55	1	5	0	1	0	—		61	1
St. Pauli (loan)	2023–24	2. Bundesliga	17	0	1	0	—		—		18	0
Career total			72	1	6	0	1	0	0	0	79	1

== Honours ==
FC St. Pauli

- 2.Bundesliga : 2023–24
