= Lars Ritzka =

German footballer

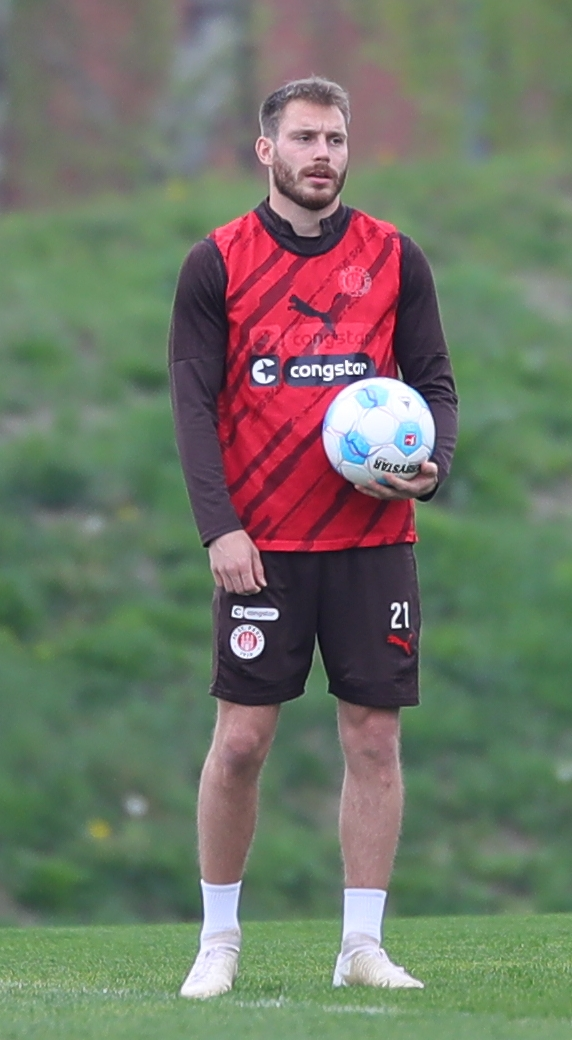
- Lars Ritzka in 2025

Personal information
- Date of birth: 7 May 1998 (age 28)
- Place of birth: Hanover, Germany
- Height: 1.85 m (6 ft 1 in)
- Position: Left-back

Team information
- Current team: FC St. Pauli
- Number: 21

Youth career
- –2014: TSV Limmer
- 2014–2017: Hannover 96

Senior career*
Years	Team	Apps	(Gls)
2017–2019	Hannover 96 II	54	(3)
2019–2021	SC Verl	58	(3)
2021–	FC St. Pauli	97	(4)
2021–2024	FC St. Pauli II	15	(0)
- * Club domestic league appearances and goals as of 20:30, 23 October 2026 (UTC)

Lars Ritzka (born 7 May 1998) is a German professional footballer who plays as a left-back for 2. Bundesliga club FC St. Pauli.

== Career ==
In May 2021, it was announced Ritzka would join 2. Bundesliga club FC St. Pauli from 3. Liga side SC Verl for the forthcoming 2021–22 season.

== Career statistics ==
As of match played 23 October 2026

Appearances and goals by club, season and competition
Club	Season	League			DFB-Pokal		Continental		Other		Total	
Club	Season	Division	Apps	Goals	Apps	Goals	Apps	Goals	Apps	Goals	Apps	Goals
Hannover 96	2016–17	2. Bundesliga	0	0	—		—		—		0	0
Hannover 96 II|	2016–17	Regionalliga Nord	1	0	—		—		—		1	0
Hannover 96 II|	2017–18	Regionalliga Nord	27	1	—		—		—		27	1
Hannover 96 II|	2018–19	Regionalliga Nord	26	2	—		—		—		26	2
Hannover 96 II|	Total		54	3	—		—		—		54	3
SC Verl	2019–20	Regionalliga West	23	1	3	0	—		3 (Note: One appearance in Westphalian Cup, two appearances in 3. Liga Promotion Playoff)	0	29	1
SC Verl	2020–21	3. Liga	35	2	—		—		1 (Note: Appearance in Westphalian Cup)	0	36	2
SC Verl	Total		58	3	3	0	—		4	0	65	3
FC St. Pauli	2021–22	2. Bundesliga	11	0	1	0	—		—		12	0
FC St. Pauli	2022–23	2. Bundesliga	10	0	0	0	—		—		10	0
FC St. Pauli	2023–24	2. Bundesliga	29	2	3	0	—		—		32	2
FC St. Pauli	2024–25	Bundesliga	21	1	2	1	—		—		23	2
FC St. Pauli	2025–26	Bundesliga	21	0	2	0	—		—		23	0
FC St. Pauli	2026–27	2. Bundesliga	5	1	0	0	—		—		5	1
FC St. Pauli	Total		97	4	8	1	—		—		105	5
FC St. Pauli II	2021–22	Regionalliga Nord	9	0	—		—		—		9	0
FC St. Pauli II	2022–23	Regionalliga Nord	3	0	—		—		—		3	0
FC St. Pauli II	Total		8	0	—		—		—		12	0
Career total			217	10	11	1	—		4	0	236	11

== Honours ==
FC St. Pauli

- 2.Bundesliga : 2023–24
