= Erik Ahlstrand =

Swedish footballer (born 2001)

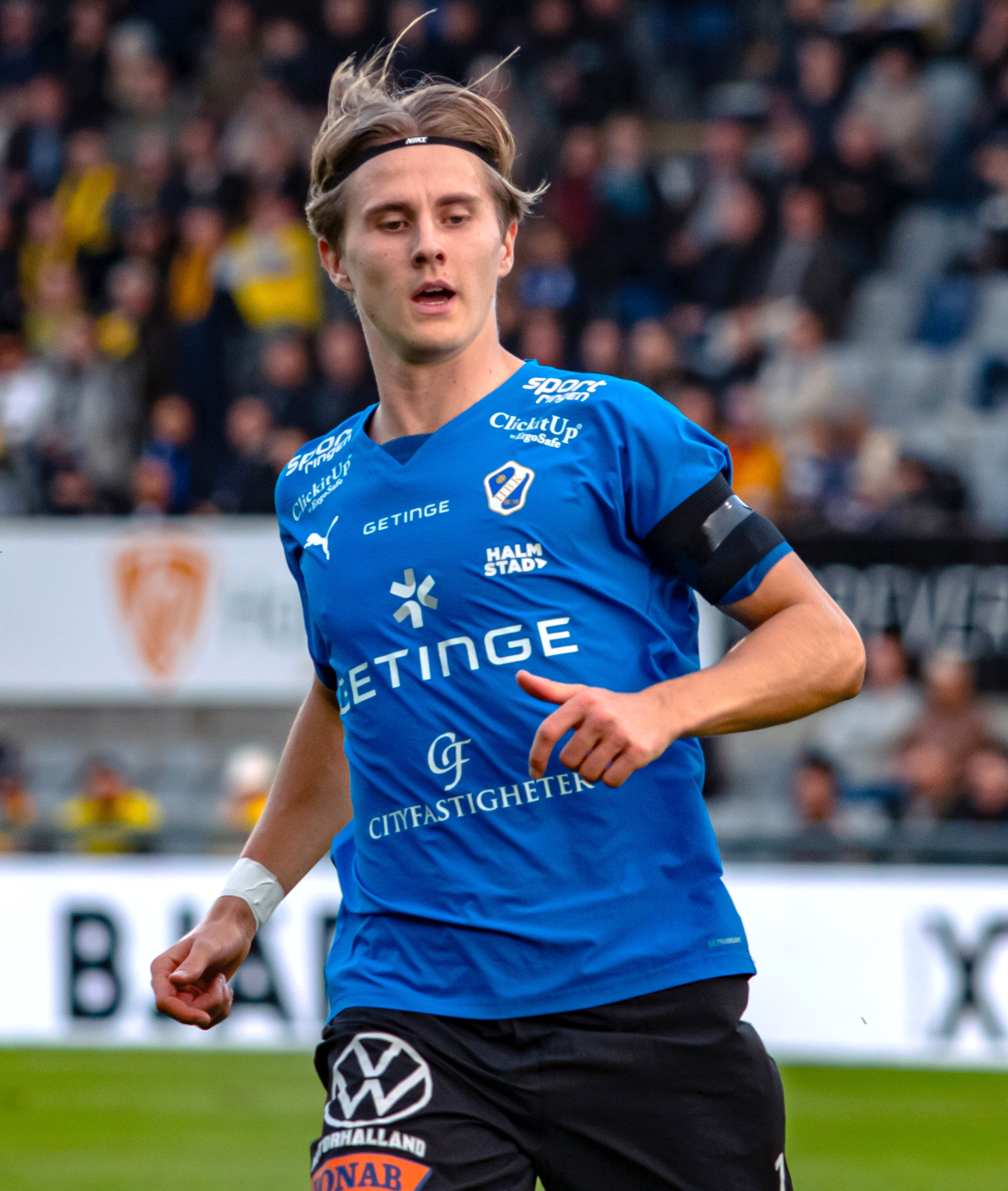
- Ahlstrand with Halmstads BK in 2023

Personal information
- Full name: Erik Melker Ahlstrand
- Date of birth: 14 October 2001 (age 25)
- Place of birth: Halmstad, Sweden
- Height: 1.82 m (6 ft 0 in)
- Position: Midfielder

Team information
- Current team: St. Pauli
- Number: 14

Youth career
- –2018: Halmstads BK

Senior career*
Years	Team	Apps	(Gls)
2019–2023	Halmstads BK	127	(8)
2024–	St. Pauli II	23	(3)
2024–	St. Pauli	5	(0)
2026	→ Heracles Almelo (loan)	14	(0)

International career^{‡}
2017	Sweden U17	3	(0)
2019–2021	Sweden U19	5	(1)
2024	Sweden	1	(0)
- * Club domestic league appearances and goals as of 21 May 2026 ‡ National team caps and goals as of 23:45, 12 January 2024 (UTC)

Erik Melker Ahlstrand (born 14 October 2001) is a Swedish professional footballer who plays as a midfielder for German 2. Bundesliga club St. Pauli. He previously played for Halmstads BK.

== Club career ==
On 27 January 2024, Ahlstrand joined FC St. Pauli in Germany.

On 8 January 2026, he was loaned by Heracles Almelo in the Netherlands, with an option to buy.

== International career ==
After having represented the Sweden U17 and U19 teams, Ahlstrand made his full international debut for the Sweden national team on 12 January 2024 in a friendly game against Estonia when he replaced Anton Saletros in the 76th minute of a 2–1 win.

== Career statistics ==
=== Club ===
As of match played 23 August 2025

Appearances and goals by club, season and competition
Club	Season	League			National cup (Note: Includes Svenska Cupen, DFB-Pokal)		Other		Total	
Club	Season	Division	Apps	Goals	Apps	Goals	Apps	Goals	Apps	Goals
Halmstads BK	2019	Superettan	24	2	3	0	—		27	2
Halmstads BK	2020	Superettan	26	2	2	0	—		28	2
Halmstads BK	2021	Allsvenskan	18	0	4	0	0 (Note: Appearances in Relegation Allsvenskan)	0	22	0
Halmstads BK	2022	Superettan	30	1	4	2	—		34	3
Halmstads BK	2023	Allsvenskan	29	3	4	1	—		33	4
Halmstads BK	Total		127	8	17	3	0	0	144	11
FC St. Pauli II	2023–24	Regionalliga Nord	2	0	—		—		2	0
FC St. Pauli II	2024–25	Regionalliga Nord	13	0	—		—		13	0
FC St. Pauli II	2025–26	Regionalliga Nord	8	3	—		—		8	3
FC St. Pauli II	Total		23	3	—		—		23	3
FC St. Pauli	2023–24	2. Bundesliga	0	0	—		—		0	0
FC St. Pauli	2024–25	Bundesliga	5	0	1	0	—		6	0
FC St. Pauli	2026–27	2. Bundesliga	1	0	1	0	—		2	0
FC St. Pauli	Total		6	0	2	0	—		8	0
Heracles (loan)	2025–26	Eredivisie	14	0	1	0	—		15	0
Career total			170	11	20	3	0	0	190	14

=== International ===
Appearances and goals by national team and year
National team	Year	Apps	Goals
Sweden	2024	1	0
Total		1	0

== Honours ==
FC St. Pauli

- 2. Bundesliga : 2023–24
