= David Nemeth =

Austrian footballer

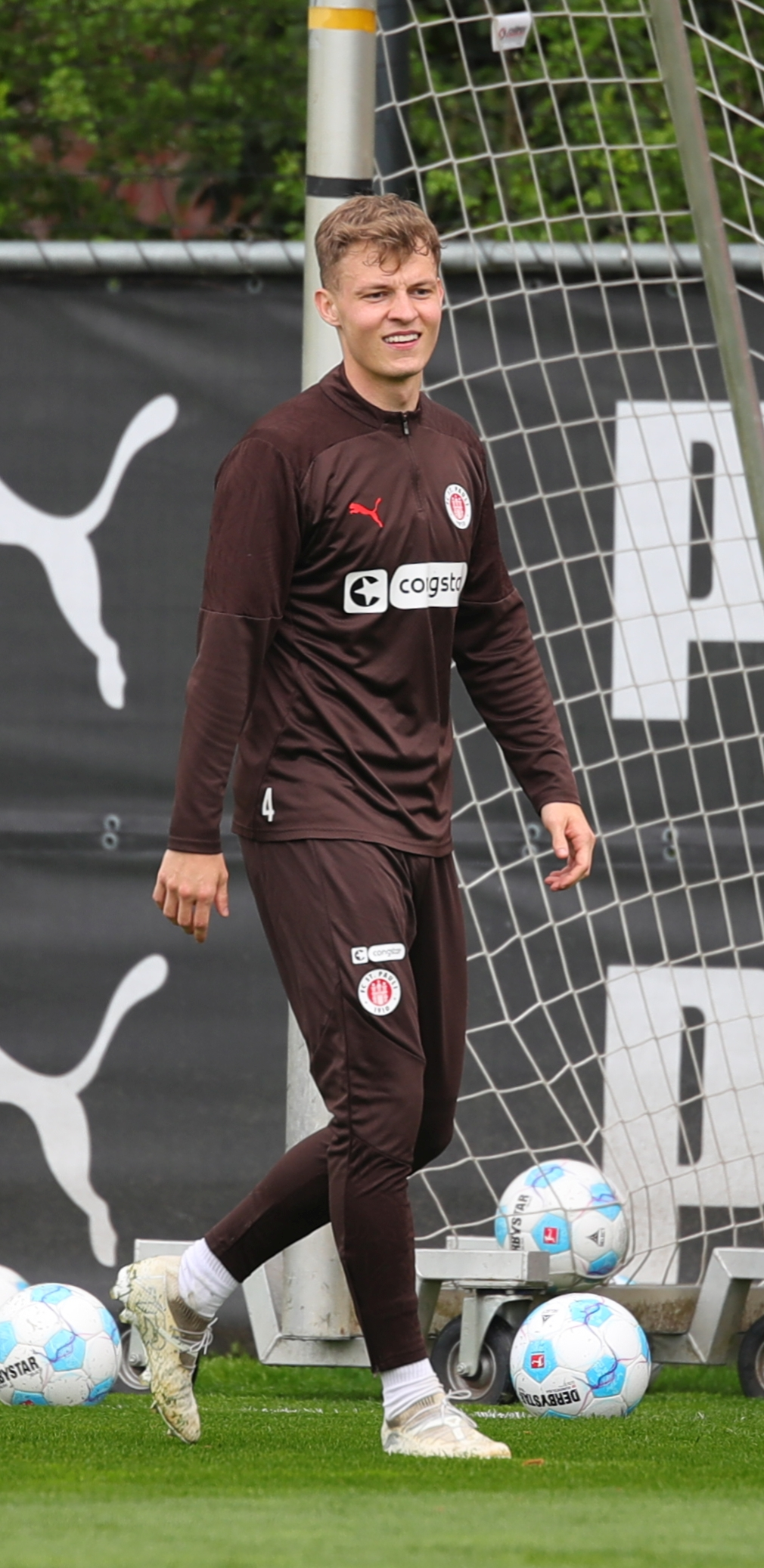
- Nemeth with FC St. Pauli in 2025

Personal information
- Date of birth: 18 March 2001 (age 25)
- Place of birth: Eisenstadt, Austria
- Height: 1.91 m (6 ft 3 in)
- Position: Defender

Team information
- Current team: FC St. Pauli
- Number: 4

Youth career
- 2008–2015: UFC St. Georgen
- 2015–2018: AKA Burgenland

Senior career*
Years	Team	Apps	(Gls)
2018–2020	SV Mattersburg II	29	(0)
2018–2020	SV Mattersburg	13	(0)
2020	Mainz 05 II	2	(0)
2021–2022	Mainz 05	6	(0)
2020–2021	→ Sturm Graz (loan)	28	(2)
2022–	FC St. Pauli	48	(1)
2023–	St. Pauli II	4	(1)

International career^{‡}
2018–2019	Austria U-18	10	(1)
2019–2020	Austria U-19	5	(0)
2021	Austria U-21	8	(0)
- * Club domestic league appearances and goals as of 20:30, 23 October 2026 (UTC) ‡ National team caps and goals as of 11 July 2024

David Nemeth (born 18 March 2001) is an Austrian professional footballer who plays as a defender and captain for 2. Bundesliga club FC St. Pauli.

== Club career ==
Nemeth made his debut in a senior game on 20 April 2018, when he appeared as a starting player for the second team of his club SV Mattersburg in the Landesliga Burgenland, the fourth highest division of Austrian football. Mattersburg II finished the season in first place and was promoted to the Regionalliga Ost. In December 2018, he was included in the Mattersburg first team squad for the first time, but did not make an appearance. He debuted for the first team in the Austrian Bundesliga in May 2019, when he started against Wacker Innsbruck on the last matchday of the 2018–19 season. In the 2019–20 season, Nemeth played for both the first and second team of Mattersburg. The club declared bankruptcy at the end of the season and became defunct.

Nemeth then moved to Germany in September 2020 and joined Mainz 05, where he signed a contract until June 2024. After making two appearances for the second team in the Regionalliga Südwest (fourth tier), he returned to Austria in October 2020 and went on loan to Sturm Graz for the rest of the season. By the end of his loan, he had made 28 appearances in the Austrian Bundesliga, scoring two goals. Nemeth returned to Mainz for the 2021–22 season and was now a member of the first team squad of head coach Bo Svensson. He played six matches in the Bundesliga and one match in the DFB Cup.

Prior to the 2022–23 season, Nemeth moved to 2. Bundesliga club FC St. Pauli. After eight appearances until October 2023, he missed the rest of the season due to an injury. In the 2023–24 season, he won the 2. Bundesliga title and was promoted to the Bundesliga with St. Pauli.

Going back to the 2. Bundesliga and after the departure of Jackson Irvine, he was named Captain of the team in August 2026.

== International career ==
Nemeth played for the Austrian under-18 and under-19 teams. He debuted for the under-21 team in March 2021.

== Career statistics ==
As of match played 23 October 2026

Appearances and goals by club, season and competition
Club	Season	League			National Cup (Note: Includes Austrian Cup, DFB-Pokal)		Other		Total	
Club	Season	Division	Apps	Goals	Apps	Goals	Apps	Goals	Apps	Goals
SV Mattersburg	2018–19	Austrian Bundesliga	1	0	–		–		1	0
SV Mattersburg	2019–20	Austrian Bundesliga	12	0	–		–		12	0
SV Mattersburg	Total		13	0	–		–		13	0
SV Mattersburg II	2018–19	Austrian Regionalliga East	10	0	–		–		10	0
SV Mattersburg II	2019–20	Austrian Regionalliga East	13	0	–		–		13	0
SV Mattersburg II	Total		23	0	–		–		23	0
Mainz 05 II	2020–21	Regionalliga Südwest	2	0	–		–		2	0
Sturm Graz	2020–21	Austrian Bundesliga	28	2	4	0	–		32	2
Mainz 05	2021–22	Bundesliga	6	0	1	0	–		7	0
FC St. Pauli	2022–23	2. Bundesliga	8	1	–		–		8	1
FC St. Pauli	2023–24	2. Bundesliga	7	0	1	0	–		8	0
FC St. Pauli	2024–25	Bundesliga	24	0	0	0	–		24	0
FC St. Pauli	2025–26	Bundesliga	0	0	1	0	–		1	0
FC St. Pauli	2026–27	2. Bundesliga	9	0	1	0	–		10	0
FC St. Pauli	Total		48	1	3	0	–		51	1
FC St. Pauli II	2023–24	Regionalliga Nord	1	0	–		–		1	0
FC St. Pauli II	2024–25	Regionalliga Nord	2	1	–		–		2	1
FC St. Pauli II	Total		3	0	–		–		3	1
Career total			123	4	8	0	–		131	4

== Honours ==
FC St. Pauli

- 2.Bundesliga: 2023–24
