= Betim Fazliji =

Kosovar footballer (born 1999)

Personal information
- Date of birth: 25 April 1999 (age 27)
- Place of birth: Vranje, FR Yugoslavia
- Height: 1.86 m (6 ft 1 in)
- Position: Defensive midfielder

Team information
- Current team: St. Gallen
- Number: 23

Youth career
- 2004–2014: FC Rebstein
- 2012–2014: → FC Altstätten (loan)
- 2014–2017: St. Gallen

Senior career*
Years	Team	Apps	(Gls)
2017–2019	St. Gallen U21	30	(5)
2019–2022	St. Gallen	87	(5)
2022–2023	St. Pauli	19	(0)
2023–	St. Gallen	31	(1)

International career^{‡}
2019	Switzerland U20	2	(0)
2020–	Kosovo	23	(0)
- * Club domestic league appearances and goals as of 28 September 2026 ‡ National team caps and goals as of 20:00, 7 June 2026 (UTC)

Betim Fazliji (Albanian: Betim Fazliu; born 25 April 1999) is a Kosovar professional footballer who plays as a Defensive Midfielder for Swiss Super League club St. Gallen and the Kosovo national team.

== Club career ==
=== St. Gallen ===
On 21 June 2019, Fazliji signed his first professional contract with Swiss Super League side St. Gallen after agreeing to a two-year deal. His debut with St. Gallen came on 27 July in a 1–2 away win against Basel after being named in the starting line-up.

=== St. Pauli ===
On 15 June 2022, Fazliji joined 2. Bundesliga side St. Pauli. His debut with St. Pauli came a day later in a 3–2 home win against 1. FC Nürnberg after coming on as a substitute at last minutes in place of Adam Dźwigała.

=== Return to St. Gallen ===
In June 2023, after one season in Germany, Fazliji returned to St. Gallen on a four-year contract.

== International career ==
=== Switzerland ===
"We parted well with Switzerland because I decided on my country and my career. I say thank you to Switzerland for everything because here I started and I achieved everything, but Kosovo is my home and I will play for them"

— Fazliji on his relation with Switzerland after choosing to play for Kosovo.

In September 2019, Fazliji becomes part of Switzerland U20 with which he made his debut in a 2–2 away draw against Portugal U20 after coming on as a substitute in the 78th minute in place of Yannick Marchand. On 2 October 2020, he received a call-up from Switzerland U21 for 2021 UEFA European Under-21 Championship qualification matches against Georgia U21 and Liechtenstein U21, but Fazliji refused to join the team after he was in process of completing the necessary documents, which would allow him to play for Kosovo in November 2020 matches.

=== Kosovo ===
On 28 September 2020, Fazliji confirmed through an interview that he has started the process of completing the necessary documents which if completed in time, Fazliji would be ready to join with Kosovo national team in the next 2020–21 UEFA Nations League matches in November 2020. On 3 November 2020, he received a call-up from Kosovo for the friendly match against Albania and 2020–21 UEFA Nations League matches against Slovenia and Moldova. Eight days later, Fazliji made his debut with Kosovo in a friendly match against Albania after being named in the starting line-up.

== Personal life ==
Fazliji was born in Vranje, FR Yugoslavia to Albanian parents from the village Miratovac of Preševo, and he is the third player of Kosovo that comes from the Preševo Valley after Gjelbrim Taipi and Fidan Haliti.

== Career statistics ==
As of match played 12 November 2022

Appearances and goals by club, season and competition
Club	Season	League			Cup		Europe		Other		Total	
Club	Season	Division	Apps	Goals	Apps	Goals	Apps	Goals	Apps	Goals	Apps	Goals
St. Gallen U21	2017-18	Swiss 1. Liga	11	3	—		—		—		11	3
St. Gallen U21	2018-19	Swiss 1. Liga	19	2	—		—		—		19	2
St. Gallen U21	Total		30	5	—		—		—		30	5
St. Gallen	2019-20	Super League	26	2	—		—		—		26	2
St. Gallen	2020-21	Super League	32	1	4	0	1	0	—		37	1
St. Gallen	2021-22	Super League	29	2	5	0	—		—		34	2
St. Gallen	Total		87	5	9	0	1	0	—		97	5
St. Pauli	2022-23	2. Bundesliga	12	0	2	0	—		—		14	0
Career total			99	10	11	0	1	0	—		111	10
