= SC Berliner Amateure =

German football club

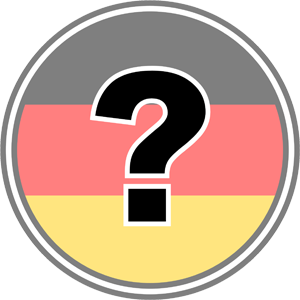
- Full name: Sport Club Berliner Amateure
- Founded: 1920
- League: Kreisliga Berlin A Staffel 4 (IX)
- 2015–16: 11th
| Home colours | Away colours |

SC Berliner Amateure is a German association football club from the city of Berlin.

== History ==
The club was established 20 June 1920. It was joined by Sportverein Gustav Cords Berlin in 1926 and then by Sportverein Deutsche Krankenversichrungs AG Berlin in 1933. The club was lost in the aftermath of World War II with the membership becoming part of Sportgemeinde Kreuzberg before it was reestablished on 1 August 1949.

Amateure has generally played as an anonymous local side throughout its existence. They made an appearance in the 1925 quarterfinal of the Berliner Pokal (Berlin Cup) where they put out by 3–0 1. FC Neukölln. From 1968 to 1971 the team was part of the Amateurliga Berlin (III). In their debut season, they earned a 3rd-place result, but quickly slipped to a last place finish and were relegated.

Today the team is part of the Berlin Kreisliga A Stafel 1 (IX). In addition to its football section, SC has a tennis department.
