= Philipp Treu =

German footballer (born 2000)

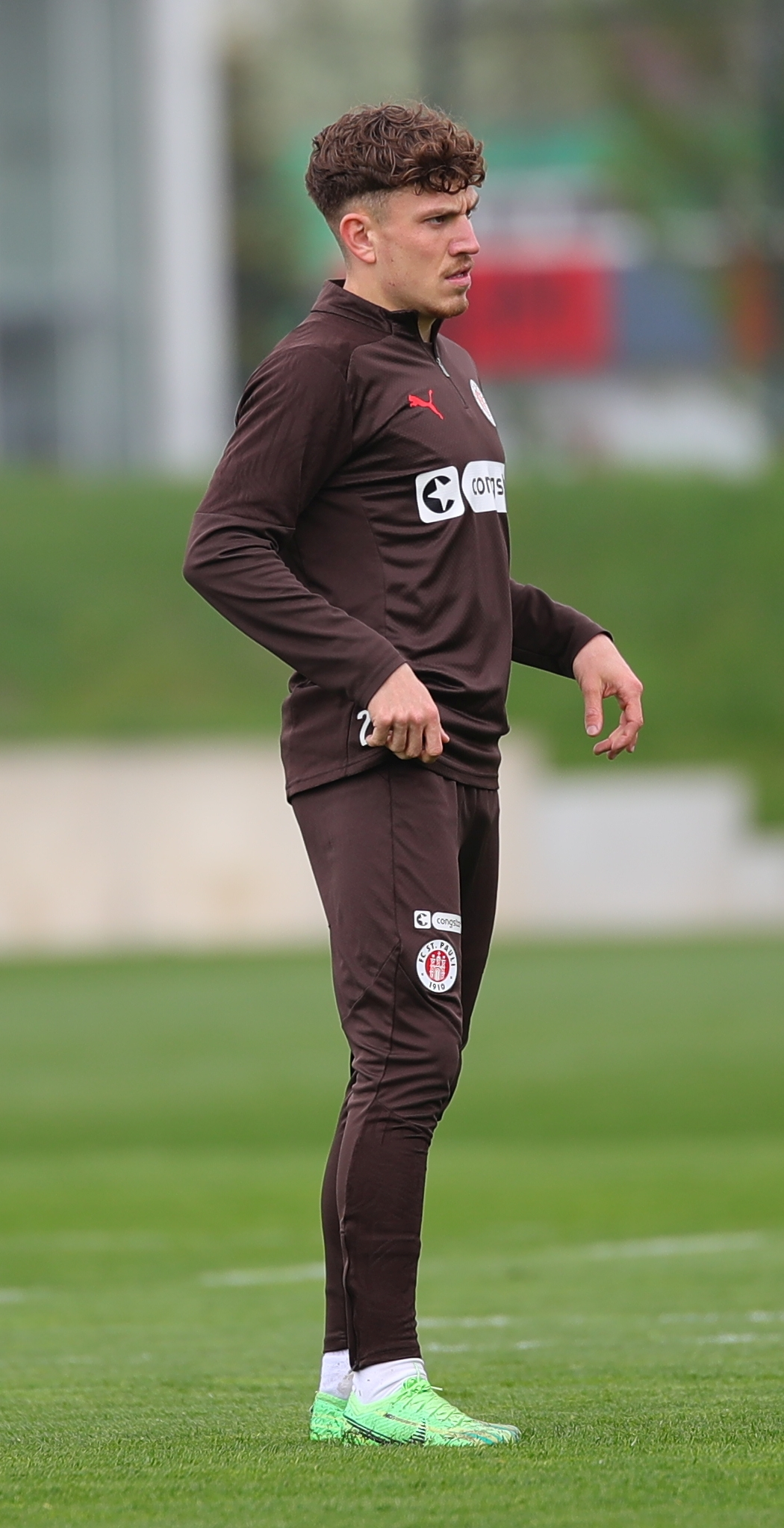
- Treu in 2025

Personal information
- Date of birth: 3 December 2000 (age 25)
- Place of birth: Heidelberg, Germany
- Height: 1.72 m (5 ft 8 in)
- Position: Right-back

Team information
- Current team: SC Freiburg
- Number: 29

Youth career
- SV Sandhausen
- –2015: 1. FC Kaiserslautern
- 2015–2017: RB Leipzig
- 2017–2019: SC Freiburg

Senior career*
Years	Team	Apps	(Gls)
2019–2023	SC Freiburg II	68	(0)
2023–2025	FC St. Pauli	59	(1)
2025–	SC Freiburg	35	(1)

International career^{‡}
2026–	Germany	5	(0)
- * Club domestic league appearances and goals as of 19:30, 25 October 2026 (UTC) ‡ National team caps and goals as of 16 November 2026

Philipp Treu (born 3 December 2000) is a German professional footballer who plays as a right-back for Bundesliga club SC Freiburg, and the Germany national team.

== Club career ==
Treu was born in Heidelberg. He joined the SV Sandhausen youth at the age of 11 and also played youth football for 1. FC Kaiserslautern and RB Leipzig before joining the U17s of SC Freiburg. During the 2022–23 3. Liga season with SC Freiburg II, his performances drew the attention of league rivals Dynamo Dresden and of Bundesliga club FC St. Pauli.

In May 2023 it was announced Treu would join Bundesliga side FC St. Pauli.

On 30 June 2025, Treu returned to SC Freiburg.

== International career ==
In September 2026, Treu was one of players who were called up with the Germany national team by head coach Jürgen Klopp for the 2026–27 UEFA Nations League matches against Netherlands, Greece, Serbia and Greece between 24 September and 4 October 2026. He made his debut on 24 September 2026 against the Netherlands.

== Career statistics ==
=== Club ===
As of 28 October 2026

Appearances and goals by club, season and competition
Club	Season	League			DFB-Pokal		Europe		Other		Total	
Club	Season	Division	Apps	Goals	Apps	Goals	Apps	Goals	Apps	Goals	Apps	Goals
SC Freiburg II	2019–20	Regionalliga Südwest	1	0	–		–		–		1	0
SC Freiburg II	2020–21	Regionalliga Südwest	5	0	–		–		–		5	0
SC Freiburg II	2021–22	3. Liga	27	0	–		–		–		27	0
SC Freiburg II	2022–23	3. Liga	35	0	–		–		–		35	0
SC Freiburg II	Total		68	0	–		–		–		68	0
FC St. Pauli	2023–24	2. Bundesliga	26	1	4	0	–		–		30	1
FC St. Pauli	2024–25	Bundesliga	33	0	2	0	–		–		35	0
FC St. Pauli	Total		59	1	6	0	–		–		65	1
SC Freiburg	2025–26	Bundesliga	28	1	4	0	14 (Note: Appearances in UEFA Europa League)	0	–		46	1
SC Freiburg	2026–27	Bundesliga	7	0	1	0	4 (Note: Appearances in UEFA Conference League)	0	–		12	0
SC Freiburg	Total		35	1	5	0	18	0	–		58	1
Career total			162	2	11	0	18	0	0	0	191	2

=== International ===
As of match played 16 November 2026

Appearances and goals by national team and year
National team	Year	Apps	Goals
Germany	2026	5	0
Total		5	0

== Honours ==
FC St. Pauli

- 2.Bundesliga : 2023–24

SC Freiburg

- UEFA Europa League runner-up: 2025–26
