= Fabian Hürzeler =

German football manager (born 1993)

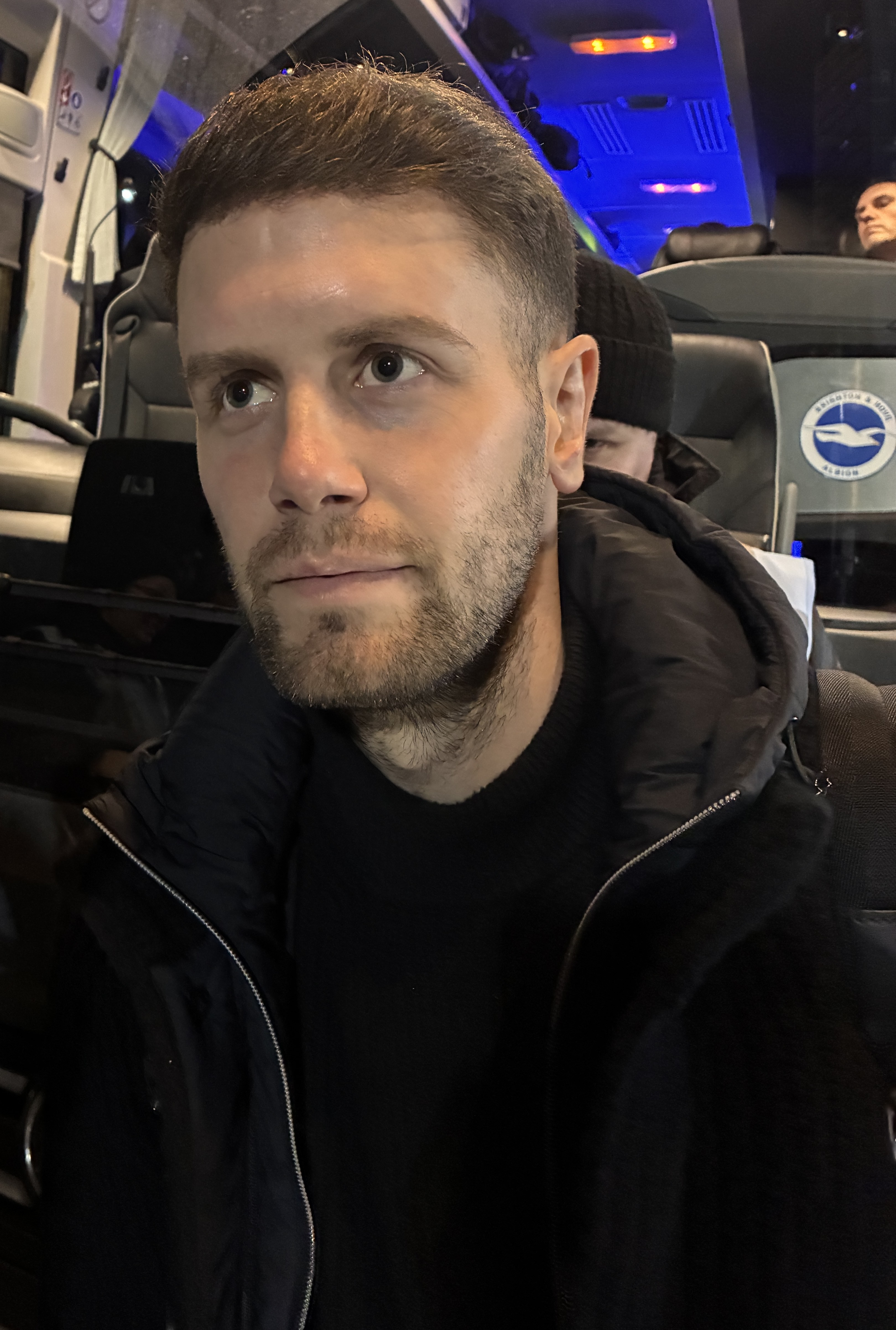
- Hürzeler in 2026

Personal information
- Full name: Fabian Marc Hürzeler
- Date of birth: 26 February 1993 (age 33)
- Place of birth: Houston, Texas, U.S.
- Position: Defensive midfielder

Team information
- Current team: Brighton & Hove Albion (head coach)

Youth career
- –2004: Helios Daglfing
- 2004–2012: Bayern Munich

Senior career*
Years	Team	Apps	(Gls)
2011–2013	Bayern Munich II	36	(3)
2013–2014	TSG Hoffenheim II	29	(5)
2014–2016	1860 Munich II	45	(2)
2016–2020	FC Pipinsried	87	(3)
2020–2022	Eimsbütteler TV	14	(2)
Total		211	(15)

International career
2008	Germany U15	1	(0)
2008–2009	Germany U16	9	(5)
2009–2010	Germany U17	10	(0)
2011	Germany U19	1	(0)

Managerial career
- 2016–2020: FC Pipinsried
- 2022–2024: FC St. Pauli
- 2024–: Brighton & Hove Albion
- * Club domestic league appearances and goals

Fabian Marc Hürzeler (born 26 February 1993) is a German professional football manager and former player. He is the current head coach of Premier League club Brighton & Hove Albion. He became the youngest permanent head coach in Premier League history at age 31.

== Playing career ==
Hürzeler joined Bayern Munich's youth academy at the age of 10 and went through all of the club's youth teams. He also represented Germany at several youth levels, collecting 21 appearances for his country. His career as a professional footballer took place mainly in the lower ranks of German football, playing with Bayern Munich II, TSG Hoffenheim II, and 1860 Munich II. He effectively ended his professional playing career at the age of 22, but continued to play at an amateur level with FC Pipinsried, as a player-coach. After joining the coaching staff of FC St. Pauli in 2020, Hürzeler joined Hamburg-based sixth division club Eimsbütteler TV and was promoted with the club to the Oberliga Hamburg, the fifth-highest level, in 2022.

== Coaching career ==
=== Early career ===
In 2016, Hürzeler, who had been eyeing a transition into a managerial role for many years and had been predicted a "great career as a coach" by former Bayern Munich II teammate Emre Can, moved down to the amateur ranks of German football, joining FC Pipinsried in a joint player-head coach role. In 2018, he also took on the job as assistant manager in charge of the Germany U20s and Germany U18s. Hürzeler took Pipinsried up from Bayernliga Süd, the fifth-highest level in Germany, to Regionalliga Bayern, the fourth division. FC Pipinsried avoided relegation to Bayernliga Süd in the first season, but went down the following season. Hürzeler stayed at Pipinsried for one more year.

=== FC St. Pauli ===
In 2020, Hürzeler was named assistant coach at FC St. Pauli, working alongside head coach Timo Schultz. On 6 December 2022, following the dismissal of Schultz, Hürzeler was appointed new interim head coach. He was given the job of head coach on a permanent basis just two weeks later, on 23 December, following several good results, thus becoming the youngest head coach in the 2. Bundesliga league at just 29. Hürzeler managed to turn round the team's fortunes, taking St. Pauli from in danger of relegation to close to the promotion places by achieving 10 wins in a row by April 2023. In April 2023, he obtained his UEFA Pro Licence at just 30. In March 2024, Hürzeler extended his contract with the club and on 12 May 2024 St. Pauli were promoted to the Bundesliga.

=== Brighton & Hove Albion ===
On 15 June 2024, Hürzeler became the new head coach of Premier League club Brighton & Hove Albion, replacing Roberto De Zerbi. He is the youngest permanent head coach in Premier League history. In his first competitive match with Brighton, Hürzeler's team won 3–0 away at Everton in the Premier League. Hürzeler oversaw an unbeaten start to Brighton's season, which also included a home win against Manchester United and an away draw at Arsenal, earning him the Premier League Manager of the Month award for August. In his first season, Brighton finished eighth in the Premier League after they beat Europa League winners Tottenham Hotspur 4–1, achieving a first ever league double over them. Despite this, Brighton missed out on European qualification due to rivals Crystal Palace winning the FA Cup.

On 7 May 2026, he extended his contract with the club until 2029. In his second season in charge, Brighton finished eighth place - the same position as the previous year and, likewise, qualified for the 2026–27 UEFA Conference League, the second time the team qualified for Europe after three years despite their home defeat to Manchester United.

== Personal life ==
Hürzeler was born in Houston, Texas, to a Swiss father and a German mother while they were working in the United States. His family moved to Germany when he was two years old, where he grew up in Bogenhausen, a district of Munich. He holds German, Swiss and American citizenship.

== Managerial statistics ==
As of match played 22 November 2026

Managerial record by team and tenure
Team	From	To	Record					Ref.
Team	From	To	P	W	D	L	Win %	Ref.
FC Pipinsried	1 July 2016	30 June 2020	103	38	28	37	36.9	
FC St. Pauli	6 December 2022	15 June 2024	55	36	12	7	65.5	
Brighton & Hove Albion	15 June 2024	Present	106	49	29	28	46.2	
Total			264	123	69	72	46.6	

== Honours ==
FC Pipinsried

- Bayernliga Süd promotion: 2016–17

FC St. Pauli

- 2. Bundesliga: 2023–24

Individual

- Premier League Manager of the Month: August 2024, September 2026
