= Etienne Amenyido =

Togolese footballer

Personal information
- Date of birth: 1 March 1998 (age 28)
- Place of birth: Herford, Germany
- Height: 1.80 m (5 ft 11 in)
- Position: Forward

Team information
- Current team: Újpest
- Number: 14

Youth career
- 2002–2011: Bünder SV
- 2011–2017: Borussia Dortmund

Senior career*
Years	Team	Apps	(Gls)
2017–2018	Borussia Dortmund II	1	(0)
2017	→ VVV-Venlo (loan)	2	(0)
2018–2021	VfL Osnabrück	69	(7)
2021–2024	FC St. Pauli	45	(5)
2021–2024	FC St. Pauli II	2	(0)
2024–2026	Preußen Münster	43	(6)
2026–	Újpest	3	(2)

International career^{‡}
2016–2017	Germany U19	7	(6)
2017	Germany U20	3	(6)
2020–	Togo	3	(0)
- * Club domestic league appearances and goals as of 18 May 2026 ‡ National team caps and goals as of 10 September 2024

Etienne Amenyido (born 1 March 1998) is a professional footballer who plays as a forward for Hungarian club Újpest. Born in Germany, he plays for the Togo national team.

== Club career ==
Amenyido made his Eredivisie debut for VVV-Venlo on 27 August 2017 in a game against AFC Ajax.

On 16 June 2021, 2. Bundesliga club FC St. Pauli announced the signing of Amenyido from relegated VfL Osnabrück.

On 10 July 2024, Amenyido signed with Preußen Münster in the 2. Bundesliga.

On 10 June 2026, Amenyido moved to Hungary and joined Újpest.

== International career ==
Amenyido was born in Germany to a Togolese mother and German father and has represented Germany at the 2017 UEFA European Under-19 Championship. He debuted for Togo in a friendly 1–1 draw against Sudan on 12 October 2020.

== Honours ==
FC St. Pauli

- 2. Bundesliga: 2023–24
