= 2025–26 DFB-Pokal =

Tournament details
- Country: Germany
- Venue(s): Olympiastadion, Berlin
- Dates: 15 August 2025 – 23 May 2026
- Teams: 64

Final positions
- Champions: Bayern Munich (21st title)
- Runners-up: VfB Stuttgart

Tournament statistics
- Matches played: 63
- Goals scored: 208 (3.3 per match)
- Attendance: 1,504,895 (23,887 per match)
- Top goal scorer(s): Harry Kane (10 goals)
- Goals scored in penalty shoot-outs not included.

The 2025–26 DFB-Pokal was the 83rd season of the annual German football cup competition. Sixty-four teams participated in the competition, including all teams from the previous year's Bundesliga and 2. Bundesliga. The competition began on 15 August 2025 with the first of six rounds and ended on 23 May 2026 with the final at the Olympiastadion in Berlin, a nominally neutral venue, which has hosted the final since 1985. The DFB-Pokal is considered the second-most important club title in German football after the Bundesliga championship. The DFB-Pokal is run by the German Football Association (DFB).

Bayern Munich won a record 21st title, and a first title since 2020, after defeating defending champions VfB Stuttgart 3–0 in the final.

The winner of the DFB-Pokal would normally have earned automatic qualification for the league phase of the 2026–27 edition of the UEFA Europa League. However, Bayern had already qualified for the UEFA Champions League as winners of the Bundesliga, so their spot went to the team in sixth place, while the league's UEFA Conference League play-off round spot went to the seventh-placed team. Bayern also qualified for the 2026 edition of the Franz Beckenbauer Supercup at the start of the next season, where they faced the runners-up of the 2025–26 Bundesliga, Borussia Dortmund.

== Participating clubs ==
The following teams qualified for the competition:

Bundesliga the 18 clubs of the 2024–25 season	2. Bundesliga; the 18 clubs of the 2024–25 season	3. Liga; the top 4 clubs of the 2024–25 season
FC Augsburg; Union Berlin; VfL Bochum; Werder Bremen; Borussia Dortmund; Eintracht Frankfurt; SC Freiburg; 1. FC Heidenheim; TSG Hoffenheim; Holstein Kiel; RB Leipzig; Bayer Leverkusen; Mainz 05; Borussia Mönchengladbach; Bayern Munich; FC St. Pauli; VfB Stuttgart; VfL Wolfsburg	Eintracht Braunschweig; Hertha BSC; Darmstadt 98; Fortuna Düsseldorf; SV Elversberg; Greuther Fürth; Hamburger SV; Hannover 96; 1. FC Kaiserslautern; Karlsruher SC; 1. FC Köln; 1. FC Magdeburg; Preußen Münster; 1. FC Nürnberg; SC Paderborn; Jahn Regensburg; Schalke 04; SSV Ulm	Arminia Bielefeld; Dynamo Dresden; 1. FC Saarbrücken; Energie Cottbus
Representatives of the regional associations 24 representatives of 21 regional associations of the DFB, qualified (in general) through the 2024–25 Verbandspokal (Note: The three regions with the most participating teams in their league competitions (Bavaria, Lower Saxony, and Westphalia) were allowed to enter two teams for the competition.)
Baden: SV Sandhausen; Bavaria (Note: In addition to the Bavarian Cup winners, the best-placed amateur team of the Regionalliga Bayern also qualified.): FV Illertissen (CW); 1. FC Schweinfurt (RB); Berlin: BFC Dynamo; Brandenburg: RSV Eintracht; Bremen: SV Hemelingen; Hamburg: Eintracht Norderstedt; Hesse: Wehen Wiesbaden	Lower Rhine: Rot-Weiss Essen; Lower Saxony (Note: The Lower Saxony Cup was split into two paths: one for 3. Liga and Regionalliga Nord teams, and the other for amateur teams. The winners of each path qualified.): Blau-Weiß Lohne (3L/RL); Atlas Delmenhorst (Am.); Mecklenburg-Vorpommern: Hansa Rostock; Middle Rhine: Viktoria Köln; Rhineland: FV Engers; Saarland: FC 08 Homburg; Saxony: Lokomotive Leipzig	Saxony-Anhalt: Hallescher FC; Schleswig-Holstein: VfB Lübeck; South Baden: Bahlinger SC; Southwest: FK Pirmasens; Thuringia: ZFC Meuselwitz; Westphalia (Note: In addition to the Westphalian Cup winners, the best-placed Westphalian team of the Regionalliga West also qualified.): Sportfreunde Lotte (CW) (Note: Sportfreunde Lotte qualified regardless of the outcome of the final of the Westphalian Cup, as Arminia Bielefeld, the other finalists, already qualified for the DFB-Pokal through their 3. Liga position.); FC Gütersloh (RW); Württemberg: Sonnenhof Großaspach

== Format ==
=== Participation ===
The DFB-Pokal began with a round of 64 teams. The 36 teams of the Bundesliga and 2. Bundesliga, along with the top four finishers of the 3. Liga automatically qualified for the tournament. Of the remaining slots, 21 were given to the cup winners of the regional football associations, the Verbandspokal. The three remaining slots were given to the three regional associations with the most men's teams, which were Bavaria, Lower Saxony and Westphalia. The best-placed amateur team of the Regionalliga Bayern was given the spot for Bavaria. For Lower Saxony, the Lower Saxony Cup was split into two paths: one for 3. Liga and Regionalliga Nord teams, and the other for amateur teams. The winners of each path qualified. For Westphalia, the spot rotated each season between the best-placed Westphalian team of the Regionalliga West and the best-placed amateur team of the Oberliga Westfalen. For the 2025–26 DFB-Pokal, this spot was awarded to a team from the Regionalliga. As every team was entitled to participate in local tournaments which qualified for the association cups, every team could in principle compete in the DFB-Pokal. Reserve teams and combined football sections were not permitted to enter, along with no two teams of the same association or corporation.

=== Draw ===
The draws for the different rounds were conducted as follows:

For the first round, the participating teams were split into two pots of 32 teams each. The first pot contained all teams which qualified through their regional cup competitions, the best four teams of the 3. Liga, and the bottom four teams of the 2. Bundesliga. Every team from this pot was drawn to a team from the second pot, which contained all remaining professional teams (all the teams of the Bundesliga and the remaining fourteen 2. Bundesliga teams). The teams from the first pot were set as the home team in the process.

The two-pot scenario was also applied for the second round, with the remaining 3. Liga and/or amateur team(s) in the first pot and the remaining Bundesliga and 2. Bundesliga teams in the other pot. Once again, the 3. Liga and/or amateur team(s) served as hosts. This time the pots did not have to be of equal size though, depending on the results of the first round. Theoretically, it was even possible that there could be only one pot, if all of the teams from one of the pots from the first round beat all the others in the second pot. Once one pot was empty, the remaining pairings were drawn from the other pot with the first-drawn team for a match serving as hosts.

For the remaining rounds, the draw was conducted from just one pot. Any remaining 3. Liga and/or amateur team(s) was the home team if drawn against a professional team. In every other case, the first-drawn team served as hosts.

=== Match rules ===
Teams met in one game per round. Matches took place for 90 minutes, with two halves of 45 minutes each. If still tied after regulation, 30 minutes of extra time were played, consisting of two periods of 15 minutes each. If the score was still level after this, the match was decided by a penalty shoot-out. A coin toss decided who took the first penalty. A maximum of nine players could be listed on the substitute bench, while a maximum of five substitutions were allowed. However, each team was only given three opportunities to make substitutions, with a fourth opportunity in extra time, excluding substitutions made at half-time, before the start of extra time and at half-time in extra time. From the round of 16 onward, a video assistant referee was appointed for all DFB-Pokal matches. Though technically possible, VAR was not used for home matches of Bundesliga clubs prior to the round of 16 in order to provide a uniform approach to all matches.

=== Suspensions ===
If a player received five yellow cards in the competition, he was then suspended from the next cup match. Similarly, receiving a second yellow card suspended a player from the next cup match. If a player received a direct red card, they were suspended a minimum of one match, but the German Football Association reserved the right to increase the suspension.

=== International qualification ===
The winners of the DFB-Pokal earned automatic qualification for the league stage of next year's edition of the UEFA Europa League. If they had already qualified for the UEFA Champions League through position in the Bundesliga, then the spot went to the team in sixth place, and the league's UEFA Conference League play-off round spot went to the team in seventh place. The winners will also host the Franz Beckenbauer Supercup at the start of the next season, and will face the champions of the previous year's Bundesliga, unless the same team won the Bundesliga and the DFB-Pokal, completing a double. In that case, the runners-up of the Bundesliga took the spot and hosted instead.

== Schedule ==
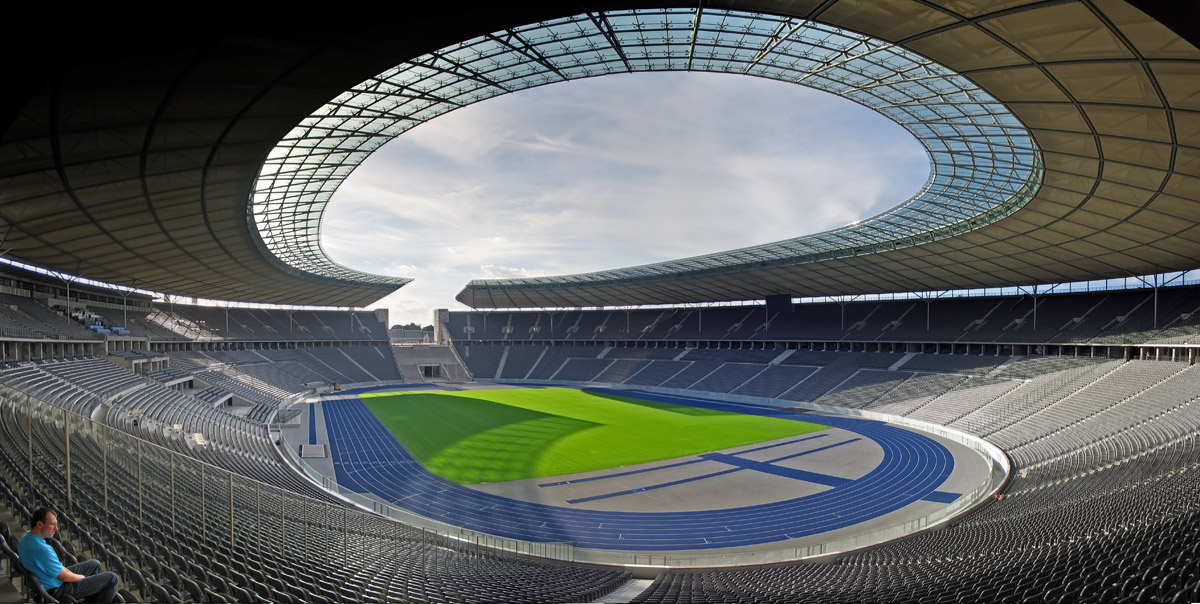
The Olympiastadion in Berlin hosted the final.

All draws were generally held on a Sunday evening after each round (unless noted otherwise).

The rounds of the 2025–26 competition were scheduled as follows:

Round	Draw date	Matches
First round	15 June 2025	15–18 August & 26–27 August 2025
Second round	31 August 2025	28–29 October 2025
Round of 16	2 November 2025	2–3 December 2025
Quarter-finals	7 December 2025	3–4 February & 10–11 February 2026
Semi-finals	22 February 2026	22–23 April 2026
Final	22 February 2026	23 May 2026 at Olympiastadion, Berlin

== Matches ==
Times up to 26 October 2025 and from 29 March 2026 are CEST (UTC+2). Times from 27 October 2025 to 28 March 2026 are CET (UTC+1).

=== First round ===
The draw took place on 15 June 2025, with Owen Ansah drawing the matches. The matches were played between 15 and 27 August 2025.

15 August 2025	FC Gütersloh	0–5	Union Berlin	Gütersloh
18:00		Report	Skov 19'; Querfeld 35'; Khedira 43'; Ilić 78'; Jeong 90+5'	Stadium: Heidewaldstadion; Attendance: 9,236; Referee: Jarno Wienefeld

15 August 2025	Sonnenhof Großaspach	0–4	Bayer Leverkusen	Aspach
18:00 (Note: The match initially kicked off at 18:00, but was suspended at 18:17 due to heavy hail hitting the pitch. The match continued from 19:00.)		Report	Schick 32'; Arthur 74'; Kofane 84'; Grimaldo 87' (pen.)	Stadium: WIRmachenDRUCK Arena; Attendance: 8,850; Referee: Michael Bacher

15 August 2025	1. FC Saarbrücken	1–3	1. FC Magdeburg	Saarbrücken
18:00	Civeja 67'	Report	Kaars 43'; Ghrieb 45+2', 59'	Stadium: Ludwigsparkstadion; Attendance: 16,003; Referee: Robin Braun

15 August 2025	Arminia Bielefeld	1–0	Werder Bremen	Bielefeld
20:45	Young 90+3'	Report		Stadium: Bielefelder Alm; Attendance: 26,515; Referee: Robert Hartmann

16 August 2025	BFC Dynamo	1–3 (a.e.t.)	VfL Bochum	Berlin
13:00	Shcherbakovski 46'	Report	Loosli 86'; Bamba 106'; Bero 119'	Stadium: Stadion im Sportforum; Attendance: 4,705; Referee: Felix Wagner

16 August 2025	FK Pirmasens	1–2 (a.e.t.)	Hamburger SV	Pirmasens
13:00	Grieß 52'	Report	Ramos 90+2'; Königsdörffer 100'	Stadium: Sportpark Husterhöhe; Attendance: 10,000; Referee: Timo Gansloweit

16 August 2025	Eintracht Norderstedt	0–0 (a.e.t.) (2–3 p)	FC St. Pauli	Hamburg
15:30		Report		Stadium: Millerntor-Stadion; Attendance: 30,000; Referee: Eric Weisbach
	Penalties
	Koch (penalty missed); Frahm (penalty scored); Brendel (penalty missed); Gross (penalty scored); Behounek (penalty missed)		(penalty missed) Wahl; (penalty missed) Fujita; (penalty scored) Oppie; (penalty scored) Sinani; (penalty scored) Nemeth

16 August 2025	Hansa Rostock	0–4	TSG Hoffenheim	Rostock
15:30		Report	Burger 37'; Moerstedt 71', 86'; Asllani 83'	Stadium: Ostseestadion; Attendance: 25,000; Referee: Wolfgang Haslberger

16 August 2025	SV Sandhausen	2–4	RB Leipzig	Sandhausen
15:30	Ampadu 3'; Herrmann 18'	Report	Diomande 6'; Orbán 23'; Banzuzi 79'; Simons 90+6'	Stadium: Hardtwaldstadion; Attendance: 15,000; Referee: Matthias Jöllenbeck

16 August 2025	Bahlinger SC	0–5	1. FC Heidenheim	Bahlingen
15:30		Report	Scienza 9', 61'; Honsak 34'; Kaufmann 77'; Conteh 83'	Stadium: Kaiserstuhlstadion; Attendance: 4,000; Referee: Lukas Benen

16 August 2025	FV Illertissen	3–3 (a.e.t.) (6–5 p)	1. FC Nürnberg	Illertissen
15:30	Milić 2'; Glessing 43'; Rühle 90'	Report	Yılmaz 65'; Stepanov 78'; Telalović 86' (pen.)	Stadium: Vöhlinstadion; Attendance: 3,000; Referee: Patrick Alt
	Penalties
	Rühle (penalty scored); Heckmann (penalty scored); Ćoćić (penalty missed); Gerstmayer (penalty scored); Zeller (penalty scored); Muth (penalty scored); Irigoyen-Goni (penalty scored)		(penalty scored) Telalović; (penalty scored) Jander; (penalty scored) Karafiát; (penalty missed) Lochoshvili; (penalty scored) Lubach; (penalty scored) Gruber; (penalty missed) Maboulou

16 August 2025	SV Hemelingen	0–9	VfL Wolfsburg	Verden
15:30		Report	Jenz 13'; Olsen 14'; Majer 39' (pen.); Pejčinović 53', 76', 81'; Svanberg 61', 71'; Černý 72'	Stadium: Stadion am Berliner Ring; Attendance: 15,000; Referee: Nico Fuchs

16 August 2025	VfB Lübeck	1–2	Darmstadt 98	Lübeck
18:00	Becken 90+1'	Report	Maglica 34'; Hornby 73'	Stadium: Stadion Lohmühle; Attendance: 10,434; Referee: Leonidas Exuzidis

16 August 2025	Energie Cottbus	1–0	Hannover 96	Cottbus
18:00	Ciğerci 12'	Report		Stadium: Stadion der Freundschaft; Attendance: 18,000; Referee: Felix Prigan

16 August 2025	Sportfreunde Lotte	0–2	SC Freiburg	Lotte
18:00		Report	Dinkçi 43'; Höler 69'	Stadium: Stadion am Lotter Kreuz; Attendance: 6,000; Referee: Florian Lechner

17 August 2025	FV Engers	0–5	Eintracht Frankfurt	Koblenz
13:00		Report	Bahoya 44'; Dōan 45', 54'; Wahi 89'; Aaronson 90+1'	Stadium: Stadion Oberwerth; Attendance: 10,100; Referee: Robert Kampka

17 August 2025	Viktoria Köln	1–3	SC Paderborn	Cologne
13:00	Otto 59'	Report	Grimaldi 5', 8'; Bilbija 36' (pen.)	Stadium: Sportpark Höhenberg; Attendance: 8,343; Referee: Sören Storks

17 August 2025	Atlas Delmenhorst	2–3	Borussia Mönchengladbach	Oldenburg
15:30	Rohwedder 32'; Urban 40'	Report	Hack 20', 38'; Elvedi 68'	Stadium: Marschweg-Stadion; Attendance: 14,300; Referee: Fabienne Michel

17 August 2025	Lokomotive Leipzig	0–1 (a.e.t.)	Schalke 04	Leipzig
15:30		Report	Lasme 107'	Stadium: Bruno-Plache-Stadion; Attendance: 11,900; Referee: Max Burda

17 August 2025	Jahn Regensburg	1–2	1. FC Köln	Regensburg
15:30	Bauer 66'	Report	Martel 90+6'; Jóhannesson 90+8'	Stadium: Jahnstadion; Attendance: 13,000; Referee: Christian Dingert

17 August 2025	Blau-Weiß Lohne	0–2	Greuther Fürth	Lohne
15:30		Report	Olesen 58'; König 84'	Stadium: Heinz-Dettmer-Stadion; Attendance: 4,500; Referee: Felix Weller

17 August 2025	ZFC Meuselwitz	0–5	Karlsruher SC	Meuselwitz
15:30		Report	Schleusener 1', 42'; Rapp 11'; Egloff 52'; Kobald 56'	Stadium: bluechip-Arena; Attendance: 4,269; Referee: Lars Erbst

17 August 2025	RSV Eintracht	0–7	1. FC Kaiserslautern	Potsdam
15:30		Report	Kunze 11'; Emreli 15'; Kim 24'; Hanslik 34'; Ritter 48'; Raschl 71'; Tachie 90+1'	Stadium: Karl-Liebknecht-Stadion; Attendance: 8,500; Referee: Cristian Ballweg

17 August 2025	FC 08 Homburg	0–2	Holstein Kiel	Homburg
18:00		Report	Tolkin 24'; Bernhardsson 90+11'	Stadium: Waldstadion Homburg; Attendance: 5,123; Referee: Assad Nouhoum

17 August 2025	Hallescher FC	0–2	FC Augsburg	Halle
18:00		Report	Mounié 52'; Essende 79'	Stadium: Leuna-Chemie-Stadion; Attendance: 14,000; Referee: Tobias Reichel

17 August 2025	SSV Ulm	0–1	SV Elversberg	Ulm
18:00		Report	Keidel 72'	Stadium: Donaustadion; Attendance: 9,531; Referee: Richard Hempel

18 August 2025	Preußen Münster	0–0 (a.e.t.) (3–5 p)	Hertha BSC	Münster
18:00		Report		Stadium: Preußenstadion; Attendance: 10,635; Referee: Martin Petersen
	Penalties
	Batista Meier (penalty scored); Scherder (penalty scored); Makridis (penalty missed); Lokotsch (penalty scored)		(penalty scored) Reese; (penalty scored) Jensen; (penalty scored) Cuisance; (penalty scored) Krattenmacher; (penalty scored) Grønning

18 August 2025	1. FC Schweinfurt	2–4	Fortuna Düsseldorf	Schweinfurt
18:00	Wintzheimer 44' (pen.); Shuranov 83'	Report	Appelkamp 66', 86'; Itten 68'; Muslija 72'	Stadium: Sachs-Stadion; Attendance: 15,000; Referee: Timo Gerach

18 August 2025	Dynamo Dresden	0–1	Mainz 05	Dresden
18:00		Report	Amiri 22'	Stadium: Rudolf-Harbig-Stadion; Attendance: 30,000; Referee: Florian Badstübner

18 August 2025	Rot-Weiss Essen	0–1	Borussia Dortmund	Essen
20:45		Report	Guirassy 79'	Stadium: Stadion an der Hafenstraße; Attendance: 19,300; Referee: Frank Willenborg

26 August 2025	Eintracht Braunschweig	4–4 (a.e.t.) (7–8 p)	VfB Stuttgart	Braunschweig
20:45	Köhler 8'; Di Michele Sanchez 77', 85'; Conteh 104'	Report	Demirović 11', 60'; Woltemade 89'; Ba 92' (o.g.)	Stadium: Eintracht-Stadion; Attendance: 20,865; Referee: Florian Exner
	Penalties
	Szabó (penalty scored); Gómez (penalty missed); Marie (penalty missed); Aydın (penalty scored); Polter (penalty scored); Bell Bell (penalty scored); Ba (penalty scored); Ehlers (penalty scored); Conteh (penalty scored); Frenkert (penalty missed)		(penalty scored) Woltemade; (penalty scored) Mittelstädt; (penalty missed) Andrés; (penalty missed) Zagadou; (penalty scored) Leweling; (penalty scored) Demirović; (penalty scored) Hendriks; (penalty scored) Vagnoman; (penalty scored) Karazor; (penalty scored) Assignon

27 August 2025	Wehen Wiesbaden	2–3	Bayern Munich	Wiesbaden
20:45	Kaya 64', 70'	Report	Kane 16' (pen.), 90+4'; Olise 51'	Stadium: Brita-Arena; Attendance: 12,500; Referee: Daniel Siebert

=== Second round ===
The draw took place on 31 August 2025 with Felix Brych drawing the matches. The matches took place on 28 and 29 October 2025.

28 October 2025	Eintracht Frankfurt	1–1 (a.e.t.) (2–4 p)	Borussia Dortmund	Frankfurt
18:30	Knauff 7'	Report	Brandt 48'	Stadium: Deutsche Bank Park; Attendance: 59,300; Referee: Sven Jablonski
	Penalties
	Uzun (penalty scored); Dōan (penalty missed); Batshuayi (penalty scored); Chaïbi (penalty missed)		(penalty scored) Silva; (penalty scored) Süle; (penalty scored) Chukwuemeka; (penalty scored) Nmecha

28 October 2025	Hertha BSC	3–0	SV Elversberg	Berlin
18:30	Cuisance 15'; Grønning 58'; Þorsteinsson 90+4' (pen.)	Report		Stadium: Olympiastadion; Attendance: 32,092; Referee: Tom Bauer

28 October 2025	1. FC Heidenheim	0–1	Hamburger SV	Heidenheim
18:30		Report	Glatzel 83' (pen.)	Stadium: Voith-Arena; Attendance: 15,000; Referee: Benjamin Brand

28 October 2025	VfL Wolfsburg	0–1	Holstein Kiel	Wolfsburg
18:30		Report	Bernhardsson 42' (pen.)	Stadium: Volkswagen Arena; Attendance: 10,793; Referee: Florian Exner

28 October 2025	Energie Cottbus	1–4	RB Leipzig	Cottbus
20:45	Engelhardt 86'	Report	Bakayoko 13'; Baumgartner 28', 37'; Banzuzi 59'	Stadium: Stadion der Freundschaft; Attendance: 19,700; Referee: Tobias Reichel

28 October 2025	Borussia Mönchengladbach	3–1	Karlsruher SC	Mönchengladbach
20:45	Machino 3'; Elvedi 51'; Tabakovic 89'	Report	Schleusener 59'	Stadium: Borussia-Park; Attendance: 48,023; Referee: Bastian Dankert

28 October 2025	FC Augsburg	0–1	VfL Bochum	Augsburg
20:45		Report	Holtmann 39'	Stadium: WWK Arena; Attendance: 20,280; Referee: Sascha Stegemann

28 October 2025	FC St. Pauli	2–2 (a.e.t.) (8–7 p)	TSG Hoffenheim	Hamburg
20:45	Wahl 1'; Lage 120+2'	Report	Prömel 47'; Kramarić 107' (pen.)	Stadium: Millerntor-Stadion; Attendance: 28,123; Referee: Daniel Schlager
	Penalties
	Smith (penalty scored); Oppie (penalty scored); Kaars (penalty scored); Lage (penalty missed); Saliakas (penalty scored); Fujita (penalty scored); Sands (penalty scored); Ceesay (penalty scored); Wahl (penalty scored)		(penalty missed) Kramarić; (penalty scored) Burger; (penalty scored) Bebou; (penalty scored) Avdullahu; (penalty scored) Bernardo; (penalty scored) Touré; (penalty scored) Kabak; (penalty scored) Tohumcu; (penalty missed) Hajdari

29 October 2025	FV Illertissen	0–3	1. FC Magdeburg	Illertissen
18:00		Report	Breunig 11'; Mathisen 31'; Pesch 84'	Stadium: Vöhlinstadion; Attendance: 4,157; Referee: Patrick Schwengers

29 October 2025	Greuther Fürth	0–1	1. FC Kaiserslautern	Fürth
18:00		Report	Skyttä 12'	Stadium: Sportpark Ronhof Thomas Sommer; Attendance: 12,411; Referee: Marc Philip Eckermann

29 October 2025	SC Paderborn	2–4 (a.e.t.)	Bayer Leverkusen	Paderborn
18:00	Marino 90'; Michel 96'	Report	Grimaldo 60'; Quansah 105+1'; Maza 120+2'; García 120+4'	Stadium: Home Deluxe Arena; Attendance: 15,000; Referee: Patrick Ittrich

29 October 2025	Mainz 05	0–2	VfB Stuttgart	Mainz
18:00		Report	Jaquez 6'; Karazor 73'	Stadium: Mewa Arena; Attendance: 29,400; Referee: Deniz Aytekin

29 October 2025	1. FC Köln	1–4	Bayern Munich	Cologne
20:45	Ache 31'	Report	Díaz 36'; Kane 38', 64'; Olise 72'	Stadium: RheinEnergieStadion; Attendance: 50,000; Referee: Tobias Welz

29 October 2025	Union Berlin	2–1 (a.e.t.)	Arminia Bielefeld	Berlin
20:45	Querfeld 11'; Doekhi 106'	Report	Momuluh 27'	Stadium: Stadion An der Alten Försterei; Attendance: 22,012; Referee: Harm Osmers

29 October 2025	Darmstadt 98	4–0	Schalke 04	Darmstadt
20:45	Akiyama 23'; Maglica 28'; Hornby 48'; Białek 60'	Report		Stadium: Merck-Stadion am Böllenfalltor; Attendance: 17,000; Referee: Felix Bickel

29 October 2025	Fortuna Düsseldorf	1–3	SC Freiburg	Düsseldorf
20:45	El Azzouzi 20'	Report	Matanović 1'; Grifo 6'; Scherhant 90+3'	Stadium: Merkur Spiel-Arena; Attendance: 36,112; Referee: Felix Zwayer

=== Round of 16 ===
The draw took place on 2 November 2025 with Felix van den Hövel drawing the matches. The matches took place on 2 and 3 December 2025.

2 December 2025	Hertha BSC	6–1	1. FC Kaiserslautern	Berlin
18:00	Schuler 5', 60'; Winkler 21'; Eichhorn 31'; Kownacki 75'; Krattenmacher 80'	Report	Ritter 45+2'	Stadium: Olympiastadion; Attendance: 51,193; Referee: Sascha Stegemann

2 December 2025	Borussia Mönchengladbach	1–2	FC St. Pauli	Mönchengladbach
18:00	Tabaković 56'	Report	Kaars 43'; Oppie 83'	Stadium: Borussia-Park; Attendance: 48,104; Referee: Sven Jablonski

2 December 2025	RB Leipzig	3–1	1. FC Magdeburg	Leipzig
21:00	Nusa 19'; Baumgartner 29', 54'	Report	Gnaka 11' (pen.)	Stadium: Red Bull Arena; Attendance: 41,108; Referee: Felix Zwayer

2 December 2025	Borussia Dortmund	0–1	Bayer Leverkusen	Dortmund
21:00		Report	Maza 34'	Stadium: Signal Iduna Park; Attendance: 81,365; Referee: Tobias Stieler

3 December 2025	SC Freiburg	2–0	Darmstadt 98	Freiburg
18:00	Grifo 42' (pen.); Höler 69'	Report		Stadium: Europa-Park Stadion; Attendance: 30,000; Referee: Harm Osmers

3 December 2025	VfL Bochum	0–2	VfB Stuttgart	Bochum
18:00		Report	Strompf 12' (o.g.); Undav 47'	Stadium: Vonovia Ruhrstadion; Attendance: 25,940; Referee: Florian Badstübner

3 December 2025	Hamburger SV	1–1 (a.e.t.) (2–4 p)	Holstein Kiel	Hamburg
20:45	Jatta 107'	Report	Harres 118'	Stadium: Volksparkstadion; Attendance: 57,000; Referee: Tobias Welz
	Penalties
	Philippe (penalty scored); Vieira (penalty scored); Muheim (penalty missed); Soumahoro (penalty missed)		(penalty scored) Zec; (penalty missed) Ivezić; (penalty scored) Schwab; (penalty scored) Nekić; (penalty scored) Harres

3 December 2025	Union Berlin	2–3	Bayern Munich	Berlin
20:45	Querfeld 40' (pen.), 55' (pen.)	Report	Ansah 12' (o.g.); Kane 24'; Leite 45+4' (o.g.)	Stadium: Stadion An der Alten Försterei; Attendance: 22,012; Referee: Martin Petersen

=== Quarter-finals ===
The draw took place on 7 December 2025, with Friedhelm Funkel drawing the matches. The matches took place between 3 and 11 February 2026.

3 February 2026	Bayer Leverkusen	3–0	FC St. Pauli	Leverkusen
20:45	Terrier 32'; Schick 63'; Hofmann 90+2'	Report		Stadium: BayArena; Attendance: 30,210; Referee: Florian Badstübner

4 February 2026	Holstein Kiel	0–3	VfB Stuttgart	Kiel
20:45		Report	Undav 56'; Führich 89'; Karazor 90+2'	Stadium: Holstein-Stadion; Attendance: 15,034; Referee: Tobias Welz

10 February 2026	Hertha BSC	1–1 (a.e.t.) (4–5 p)	SC Freiburg	Berlin
20:45	Reese 104'	Report	Suzuki 96'	Stadium: Olympiastadion; Attendance: 56,743; Referee: Patrick Ittrich
	Penalties
	Reese (penalty scored); Schuler (penalty scored); Cuisance (penalty missed); Brekalo (penalty scored); Seguin (penalty scored); Klemens (penalty missed)		(penalty scored) Grifo; (penalty scored) Ginter; (penalty scored) Eggestein; (penalty missed) Manzambi; (penalty scored) Höler; (penalty scored) Suzuki

11 February 2026	Bayern Munich	2–0	RB Leipzig	Munich
20:45	Kane 64' (pen.); Díaz 67'	Report		Stadium: Allianz Arena; Attendance: 75,000; Referee: Daniel Siebert

=== Semi-finals ===
The draw took place on 22 February 2026, with Max Langenhan drawing the matches. The matches took place on 22 and 23 April 2026.

22 April 2026	Bayer Leverkusen	0–2	Bayern Munich	Leverkusen
20:45		Report	Kane 22'; Díaz 90+3'	Stadium: BayArena; Attendance: 30,210; Referee: Felix Zwayer

23 April 2026	VfB Stuttgart	2–1 (a.e.t.)	SC Freiburg	Stuttgart
20:45	Undav 70'; Tomás 119'	Report	Eggestein 28'	Stadium: MHPArena; Attendance: 60,000; Referee: Tobias Welz

=== Final ===
The match took place on 23 May 2026.

23 May 2026
20:00 CEST

Bayern Munich	3–0	VfB Stuttgart
Kane 55', 80', 90+2' (pen.)	Report

Olympiastadion, Berlin
Attendance: 74,036
Referee: Sven Jablonski (Bremen)

== Top goalscorers ==
The following were the top scorers of the DFB-Pokal, sorted first by number of goals, and then alphabetically if necessary. Goals scored in penalty shoot-outs are not included.

Rank	Player	Team	Goals
1	(England) Harry Kane	Bayern Munich	10
2	(Austria) Christoph Baumgartner	RB Leipzig	4
2	(Austria) Leopold Querfeld	Union Berlin	4
4	(Colombia) Luis Díaz	Bayern Munich	3
4	(Germany) Dženan Pejčinović	VfL Wolfsburg	3
4	(Germany) Fabian Schleusener	Karlsruher SC	3
4	(Germany) Deniz Undav	VfB Stuttgart	3
8	28 players		2
