= 2025–26 FC St. Pauli season =

FC St. Pauli
2025–26 season
- Head coach: Alexander Blessin
- Stadium: Millerntor-Stadion
- Bundesliga: 18th (relegated)
- DFB-Pokal: Quarterfinal
- Top goalscorer: League: Andréas Hountondji; Danel Sinani (4 each); All: Andréas Hountondji; Danel Sinani (4 each)
- Average home league attendance: 29,505
Home colours	Away colours	Third colours
- All statistics correct as of 16 May 2026.

The 2025–26 FC St. Pauli season was the 115th season in the football club's history and second consecutive season in the top division of German football, the Bundesliga and 11th overall. The last time the club remained in the German top tier was in the 1995–1997 period. In addition to the domestic league, FC St. Pauli also participated in this season's edition of the DFB-Pokal. This was the 63rd season for FC St. Pauli in the Millerntor-Stadion, located in St. Pauli, Hamburg, Germany. The season covered a period from 1 July 2025 to 30 June 2026.

== Transfers ==
=== In ===
Pos.	Player	Transferred from	Fee	Date	Source
DF	(Poland) Arkadiusz Pyrka	(Poland) Piast Gliwice	Free transfer	19 May 2025	
MF	(United States) James Sands	(United States) New York City FC	Loan	20 May 2025	
DF	(Austria) Jannik Robatsch	Austria Klagenfurt	€400,000	6 June 2025	
FW	(Jamaica) Ricky-Jade Jones	(England) Peterborough United	Free transfer	14 June 2025	
GK	(Austria) Simon Spari	Austria Klagenfurt	€200,000	19 June 2025	
FW	(Portugal) Mathias Pereira Lage	(France) Brest	Free transfer	20 June 2025	
MF	(Japan) Joel Chima Fujita	(Belgium) St. Truiden	€3,500,000	27 June 2025	
FW	(Brazil) Maurides	(Hungary) Debreceni VSC	Loan return	1 July 2025	
FW	(Benin) Andréas Hountondji	(England) Burnley	Loan	8 July 2025	
DF	(Germany) Louis Oppie	(Germany) Arminia Bielefeld	€2,000,000	11 July 2025	
FW	(Netherlands) Martijn Kaars	(Germany) 1. FC Magdeburg	€4,000,000	28 August 2025	
DF	(Japan) Tomoya Ando	(Japan) Avispa Fukuoka	Undisclosed	1 January 2026	
GK	(Canada) Emil Gazdov	(Canada) CF Montréal	Loan	4 January 2026	
MF	(Norway) Mathias Rasmussen	(Belgium) Royale Union Saint-Gilloise	€1,000,000	24 January 2026	
FW	(Japan) Taichi Hara	(Japan) Kyoto Sanga	Free transfer	31 January 2026	

=== Out ===
Pos.	Player	Transferred to	Fee	Date	Source
FW	(Germany) Simon Zoller	Retired	End of contract	4 June 2025	
GK	(Germany) Sascha Burchert	Retired	End of contract	4 June 2025	
GK	(Germany) Sören Ahlers	Retired	End of contract	4 June 2025	
GK	(Germany) Eric Oelschlägel	Released	End of contract	4 June 2025	
FW	(Denmark) Andreas Albers	Retired	End of contract	4 June 2025	
DF	(Belgium) Siebe Van der Heyden	(Spain) Mallorca	Loan return	4 June 2025	
MF	(Germany) Robert Wagner	(Germany) SC Freiburg	Loan return	4 June 2025	
FW	(Germany) Noah Weißhaupt	(Germany) SC Freiburg	Loan return	4 June 2025	
FW	(Guinea) Morgan Guilavogui	(France) RC Lens	€4,500,000	11 June 2025	
MF	(Germany) Carlo Boukhalfa	(Switzerland) FC St. Gallen	End of contract	12 June 2025	
FW	(Germany) Johannes Eggestein	Austria Wien	End of contract	12 June 2025	
FW	(Tunisia) Elias Saad	(Germany) FC Augsburg	€2,000,000	26 June 2025	
DF	(Germany) Philipp Treu	(Germany) SC Freiburg	€5,500,000	30 June 2025	
FW	(Brazil) Maurides	(Poland) Radomiak Radom	€50,000	15 July 2025	
FW	(Scotland) Scott Banks	(England) Blackpool	Loan	1 September 2025	
MF	(Sweden) Erik Ahlstrand	(Netherlands) Heracles Almelo	Loan	8 January 2026	
FW	(Scotland) Scott Banks	(England) Barnsley	Loan	26 January 2026	
FW	(England) Dapo Afolayan	(England) Blackburn Rovers	Free transfer	1 February 2026	

== Friendlies ==
=== Pre-season ===
6 July 2025 Friendly	SV Grün-Weiß Firrel	0–10	FC St. Pauli	Aurich
16:00 UTC+2	Schaffer (yellow card)	Report	Banks 8'; Stevens 12'; Pereira Lage 30'; Jones 49', 90'; Nemeth 61'; Sinani 65'; Maurides 68'; Afolayan 70'; Sands 75'	Stadium: Ellernfeldstadion; Attendance: 3,500; Referee: Anke Hölscher (Westerende)

12 July 2025 Friendly	SV Drochtersen/Assel	1–0	FC St. Pauli	Drochtersen
15:00 UTC+2	Mohr 60'	Report	Pyrka (yellow card)	Stadium: Kehdinger Stadion; Attendance: 3,561; Referee: Kilian Braun (Jork)

15 July 2025 Friendly	Silkeborg IF	1–4	FC St. Pauli	Malente
16:00 UTC+2	Adamsen 24'; Andersen (yellow card)	Report	Ceesay 5'; Afolayan 20'; Lage 54'; Hountondji 83'	Stadium: Uwe-Seeler-Sportpark; Attendance: 1,000; Referee: Lennart Kernchen (Hanover)

20 July 2025 Friendly	FC St. Pauli	6–1	Karlsruher SC	Saalfelden, Austria
16:00 UTC+2	Dźwigała 18'; Metcalfe 29'; Afolayan 39'; Sinani 72', (yellow card); Pyrka 102'; Ceesay 106'	Report	Ben Farhat 86'; Burnić (yellow card)	Stadium: Saalfelden Arena; Attendance: 500
Note: Two halves of 60 minutes

26 July 2025 Friendly	FC St. Pauli	2–0	OGC Nice	Anif, Austria
15:00 UTC+2	Banks 84'; Stevens 89'	Report		Stadium: Maximarkt Sportpark; Attendance: 800; Referee: Philip Gadler (Klagenfurt)

2 August 2025 Friendly	Coventry City	2–2	FC St. Pauli	Coventry, England
16:30 UTC+2	Thomas-Asante 18'; Simms 75'	Report	Hountondji 43'; Sinani 81'	Stadium: Coventry Building Society Arena; Attendance: 10,000; Referee: Tom Reeves

9 August 2025 Friendly	FC St. Pauli	1–0	Hellas Verona	Imst, Austria
16:00 UTC+2	Hountondji 15'; Afolayan (yellow card)	Report	Nuñez (yellow card); Valentini (yellow card); Slotsager (yellow card)	Stadium: Velly Arena; Attendance: 500; Referee: Stefan Macanovic

=== In-season (autumn) ===
3 September 2025 Friendly	Holstein Kiel	1–1	FC St. Pauli	Kiel
13:30 UTC+2	Müller 55'	Report	Afolayan 41'	Stadium: CITTI Fussball Park; Attendance: behind closed doors Referee: Ben Henry Uhrig (Rellingen)

=== Mid-season ===
4 January 2026 Friendly	FC St. Pauli	0−0	Werder Bremen	Hamburg
15:30 UTC+1		Report		Stadium: Millerntor-Stadion; Attendance: 25,087; Referee: Luca Jürgensen (Hamburg)

== Competitions ==
=== Overall record ===
Competition	First match	Last match	Starting round	Final position	Record							
Competition	First match	Last match	Starting round	Final position	Pld	W	D	L	GF	GA	GD	Win %
Bundesliga	23 August 2025	16 May 2026	Matchday 1		34	6	8	20	29	60	−31	17.65
DFB-Pokal	16 August 2025	3 February 2026	First round	Quarterfinal	4	1	2	1	4	6	−2	25.00
Total					38	7	10	21	33	66	−33	18.42

Last updated: 16 May 2026
Source: Flashscore

=== Bundesliga ===
==== League table ====
Pos	Team	Pld	W	D	L	GF	GA	GD	Pts	Qualification or relegation
14	1. FC Köln	34	7	11	16	49	63	−14	32	
15	Werder Bremen	34	8	8	18	37	60	−23	32	
16	VfL Wolfsburg (R)	34	7	8	19	45	69	−24	29	Qualification for the relegation play-offs
17	1. FC Heidenheim (R)	34	6	8	20	41	72	−31	26	Relegation to 2. Bundesliga
18	FC St. Pauli (R)	34	6	8	20	29	60	−31	26	Relegation to 2. Bundesliga

Source: Bundesliga
Rules for classification: 1) Points; 2) Goal difference; 3) Goals scored; 4) Head-to-head results; 5) Head-to-head away goals scored; 6) Away goals scored; 7) Play-off.
(Rules 4–6 only apply after home and away matches have been played between the tied teams.)
(R) Relegated

==== Results summary ====
Overall								Home						Away					
Pld	W	D	L	GF	GA	GD	Pts	W	D	L	GF	GA	GD	W	D	L	GF	GA	GD
34	6	8	20	29	60	−31	26	4	5	8	17	31	−14	2	3	12	12	29	−17

Last updated: 16 May 2026.
Source: kicker.de

==== Results by round ====
Round	1	2	3	4	5	6	7	8	9	10	11	12	13	14	15	16	17	18	19	20	21	22	23	24	25	26	27	28	29	30	31	32	33	34
Ground	H	A	H	A	H	A	H	A	H	A	H	A	A	H	A	H	A	A	H	A	H	A	H	A	H	A	H	A	H	H	A	H	A	H
Result	D	W	W	L	L	L	L	L	L	L	L	L	D	W	D	D	L	L	D	L	W	L	W	W	D	L	L	D	L	D	L	L	L	L
Position	8	5	4	5	9	10	14	14	15	16	16	17	17	16	16	16	17	18	17	17	17	17	16	15	16	16	16	16	16	16	16	17	18	18

Source: Bundesliga Fixtures & Results
A = Away; H = Home; W = Win; D = Draw; L = Loss

==== Matches ====
The league schedule was released on 27 June 2025.

23 August 2025 1	FC St. Pauli	3–3	Borussia Dortmund	Hamburg
18:30 UTC+2	Dźwigała (yellow card) 22'; Smith (yellow card) 38', (goal) 89'; Hountondji 50'; Sinani 86' (pen.)	FCSP Report; Kicker Report	Bensebaini (yellow card) 26'; Guirassy 34', (penalty missed) 39'; Couto (yellow card) 65'; Anton 67'; Brandt 74'; Mané (red card) 85'; Sabitzer (yellow card) 90+3'	Stadium: Millerntor-Stadion; Attendance: 29,546; Referee: Matthias Jöllenbeck (Freiburg im Breisgau)

29 August 2025 2	Hamburger SV	0–2	FC St. Pauli	Hamburg
20:30 UTC+2	Gocholeishvili (yellow card) 26' (yellow-red card) 77'; Poulsen (yellow card) 64'	FCSP Report; Kicker Report	Dźwigała (yellow card) 7', (goal) 19'; Sinani (yellow card) 37'; Pyrka (yellow card) 54'; Houtondji 60'	Stadium: Volksparkstadion; Attendance: 57,000; Referee: Christian Dingert (Lebecksmühle)

14 September 2025 3	FC St. Pauli	2–1	FC Augsburg	Hamburg
15:30 UTC+2	Pyrka (yellow card) 36'; Houtondji (penalty missed) 45', 45'; Sinani 77'	FCSP Report; Kicker Report	Rieder 16'; Rexhbeçaj (yellow card) 40'; Wagner (yellow card) 45+3'; Saad (yellow card) 63'; Matsima (yellow card) 67'; Fellhauer (yellow card) 76'	Stadium: Millerntor-Stadion; Attendance: 29,546; Referee: Harm Osmers (Hanover)

19 September 2025 4	VfB Stuttgart	2–0	FC St. Pauli	Stuttgart
20:30 UTC+2	Stiller (penalty missed) 25'; Demirović 43'; El Khannouss 50'	FCSP Report; Kicker Report	Sands (yellow card) 40'; Afolayan (yellow card) 67'	Stadium: MHPArena; Attendance: 60,000; Referee: Sascha Stegemann (Niederkassel)

27 September 2025 5	FC St. Pauli	1–2	Bayer Leverkusen	Hamburg
15:30 UTC+2	Wahl 32'; Fujita (yellow card) 50'; Smith (yellow card) 86'; Ceesay (yellow card) 90+8'	FCSP Report; Kicker Report	Quansah (yellow card) 21'; Tapsoba 25'; Poku 58'; Vázquez (yellow card) 60'; Hjulmand (yellow card) 85'; Badé (yellow card) 90+2'; Fernández (yellow card) 90+2'; Kofane (yellow card) 90+9'	Stadium: Millerntor-Stadion; Attendance: 29,546; Referee: Martin Petersen (Stuttgart)

4 October 2025 6	Werder Bremen	1–0	FC St. Pauli	Bremen
15:30 UTC+2	Mbangula 2'; Puertas (yellow card) 68'; Stage (yellow card) 72'; Grüll (yellow card) 90'	FCSP Report; Kicker Report	Saliakas (yellow card) 90+5'	Stadium: Weserstadion; Attendance: 42,100; Referee: Sören Storks (Ramsdorf)

19 October 2025 7	FC St. Pauli	0–3	TSG Hoffenheim	Hamburg
17:30 UTC+2	Dźwigała (yellow card) 67'	FCSP Report; Kicker Report	Burger (yellow card) 43'; Hajdari (yellow card) 44'; Touré 54'; Kramarić 59'; Prömel 79'; Hranáč (yellow card) 87'	Stadium: Millerntor-Stadion; Attendance: 29,248; Referee: Sven Jablonski (Bremen)

25 October 2025 8	Eintracht Frankfurt	2–0	FC St. Pauli	Frankfurt
15:30 UTC+2	Burkardt 36', 56'	FCSP Report; Kicker Report	Pereira Lage (yellow card) 37'	Stadium: Deutsche Bank Park; Attendance: 59,500; Referee: Robin Braun (Wuppertal)

1 November 2025 9	FC St. Pauli	0–4	Borussia Mönchengladbach	Hamburg
15:30 UTC+1	Sands (yellow card) 18'; Saliakas (yellow card) 60'; Ceesay (yellow card) 63'; Hountondji (yellow card) 90+4'	FCSP Report; Kicker Report	Tabaković 15', 40'; Machino 75'; Fraulo 80'	Stadium: Millerntor-Stadion; Attendance: 29,546; Referee: Robert Hartmann (Wangen im Allgäu)

9 November 2025 10	SC Freiburg	2–1	FC St. Pauli	Freiburg im Breisgau
15:30 UTC+1	Suzuki 40'; Eggestein 50', (yellow card) 81'; Beste (yellow card) 84'	FCSP Report; Kicker Report	Oppie 69'; Sinani (yellow card) 84'; Chima Fujita (yellow card) 90+2'	Stadium: Europa-Park Stadion; Attendance: 34,700; Referee: Benjamin Brand (Schwebheim)

23 November 2025 11	FC St. Pauli	0–1	Union Berlin	Hamburg
17:30 UTC+1	Chima Fujita (yellow card) 38'	FCSP Report; Kicker Report	Khedira 44', (yellow card) 46'	Stadium: Millerntor-Stadion; Attendance: 29,546; Referee: Tobias Stieler (Sölden)

29 November 2025 12	Bayern Munich	3–1	FC St. Pauli	Munich
15:30 UTC+1	Guerreiro 44'; Tah (yellow card) 83'; Díaz 90+3'; Jackson 90+6'	FCSP Report; Kicker Report	Hountondji 6'; Mets (yellow card) 39'	Stadium: Allianz Arena; Attendance: 75,000; Referee: Felix Zwayer (Berlin)

6 December 2025 13	1. FC Köln	1–1	FC St. Pauli	Cologne
15:30 UTC+1	El Mala 51'	FCSP Report; Kicker Report	Jones 90+4', (yellow card) 90+5'	Stadium: RheinEnergieStadion; Attendance: 50,000; Referee: Tobias Reichel (Sindelfingen)

13 December 2025 14	FC St. Pauli	2–1	1. FC Heidenheim	Hamburg
15:30 UTC+1	Sands (yellow card) 25'; Kaars 35', 53'; Smith (red card) 45+1'; Blessin (yellow card) 45+3'; Pyrka (yellow card) 69'	FCSP Report; Kicker Report	Schöppner (yellow card) 42'; Pieringer 64', (yellow card) 87'; Kaufmann (yellow card) 73'	Stadium: Millerntor-Stadion; Attendance: 29,546; Referee: Sören Storks (Ramsdorf)

21 December 2025 15	Mainz 05	0–0	FC St. Pauli	Mainz
15:30 UTC+1	Sano (yellow card) 32'	FCSP Report; Kicker Report	Pereira Lage (yellow card) 62'	Stadium: Mewa Arena; Attendance: 33,000; Referee: Matthias Jöllenbeck (Freiburg im Breisgau)

14 January 2026 17	VfL Wolfsburg	2–1	FC St. Pauli	Wolfsburg
18:30 UTC+1	Eriksen 25' (pen.); Jenz (yellow card) 55'; Pejčinović 88'	FCSP Report; Kicker Report	Smith 40'; Ritzka (yellow card) 53'; Dźwigała (yellow card) 84'	Stadium: Volkswagen Arena; Attendance: 22,031; Referee: Frank Willenborg (Osnabrück)

17 January 2026 18	Borussia Dortmund	3–2	FC St. Pauli	Dortmund
15:30 UTC+1	Schlotterbeck (yellow card) 16'; Adeyemi (yellow card) 43', (goal) 54'; Brandt 45+1'; Bellingham (yellow card) 69'; Can 90+6' (pen.)	FCSP Report; Kicker Report	Smith (yellow card) 38'; Sands 62'; Jones 72'	Stadium: Signal Iduna Park; Attendance: 81,365; Referee: Harm Osmers (Hanover)

23 January 2026 19	FC St. Pauli	0–0	Hamburger SV	Hamburg
20:30 UTC+1	Dźwigała (yellow card) 7'	FCSP Report; Kicker Report	Rember (yellow card) 24'	Stadium: Millerntor-Stadion; Attendance: 29,183; Referee: Tobias Welz (Wiesbaden)

27 January 2026 16	FC St. Pauli	1–1	RB Leipzig	Hamburg
20:30 UTC+1	Kaars 90+3' (pen.)	FCSP Report; Kicker Report	Baumgartner (yellow card) 49'; Diomande 66'	Stadium: Millerntor-Stadion; Attendance: 29,147; Referee: Florian Exner (Münster)
Note: The game was scheduled originally for 10 January, but it was postponed due to extreme weather conditions. On 13 January the DFL announced a new date for the game.

31 January 2026 20	FC Augsburg	2–1	FC St. Pauli	Augsburg
15:30 UTC+1	Wolf (yellow card) 29'; Baum (yellow card) 31'; Gregoritsch 41', 59'; Fellhauer (yellow card) 44'; Banks (yellow card) 69'	FCSP Report; Kicker Report	Sinani 32' (pen.); Sands (yellow card) 90+1'	Stadium: WWK Arena; Attendance: 30,660; Referee: Sascha Stegemann (Niederkassel)

7 February 2026 21	FC St. Pauli	2–1	VfB Stuttgart	Hamburg
15:30 UTC+1	Saliakas 35'; Sinani 55' (pen.)	FCSP Report; Kicker Report	Undav (yellow card) 58'; Demirović (yellow card) 72'; Leweling 90'	Stadium: Millerntor-Stadion; Attendance: 29,546; Referee: Benjamin Brand (Schwebheim)

14 February 2026 22	Bayer Leverkusen	4–0	FC St. Pauli	Leverkusen
15:30 UTC+1	Quansah 13'; Schick 14'; Tapsoba 52'; Poku 78'	FCSP Report; Kicker Report	Mets (yellow card) 90+2'	Stadium: BayArena; Attendance: 30,210; Referee: Sven Jablonski (Bremen)

22 February 2026 23	FC St. Pauli	2–1	Werder Bremen	Hamburg
17:30 UTC+1	Kaars (yellow card) 29'; Wahl 55'; Chima Fujita 70'; Saliakas (yellow card) 75'	FCSP Report; Kicker Report	Schmidt (yellow card) 7'; Lynen (yellow card) 54'; Milošević 62', (yellow card) 76'; Friedl (yellow card) 75'; Bittencourt (yellow card) 76'; Stark (yellow card) 88'	Stadium: Millerntor-Stadion; Attendance: 29,546; Referee: Sören Storks (Ramsdorf)

28 February 2026 24	TSG Hoffenheim	0–1	FC St. Pauli	Sinsheim
15:30 UTC+1	Kabak (yellow card) 21'	FCSP Report; Kicker Report	Sinani (yellow card) 38'; Pereira Lage 45+4'; Chima Fujita (yellow card) 80'	Stadium: PreZero Arena; Attendance: 27,786; Referee: Deniz Aytekin (Oberasbach)

8 March 2026 25	FC St. Pauli	0–0	Eintracht Frankfurt	Hamburg
15:30 UTC+1	Ando (yellow card) 62'; Metcalfe (yellow card) 89'; Blessin (yellow card) 90+3'	FCSP Report; Kicker Report	Dōan (yellow card) 76'	Stadium: Millerntor-Stadion; Attendance: 29,546; Referee: Felix Zwayer (Berlin)

13 March 2026 26	Borussia Mönchengladbach	2–0	FC St. Pauli	Mönchengladbach
20:30 UTC+1	Stöger 37'; Tabaković (yellow card) 56'; Honorat 62'	FCSP Report; Kicker Report	Wahl (yellow card) 6'; Smith (yellow card) 36'	Stadium: Borussia-Park; Attendance: 49,202; Referee: Daniel Schlager (Gernsbach)

22 March 2026 27	FC St. Pauli	1–2	SC Freiburg	Hamburg
17:30 UTC+1	Ando (yellow card) 14'; Sinani 24'; Blessin (yellow card) 80'	FCSP Report; Kicker Report	Matanović 65', 78'; Suzuki (yellow card) 90+8'	Stadium: Millerntor-Stadion; Attendance: 29,546; Referee: Florian Badstübner (Nuremberg)

5 April 2026 28	Union Berlin	1–1	FC St. Pauli	Berlin
15:30 UTC+2	Ilić 52'	FCSP Report; Kicker Report	Pereira Lage 25'; Irvine (yellow card) 85' (yellow-red card) 90+3'	Stadium: Stadion An der Alten Försterei; Attendance: 22,012; Referee: Tobias Welz (Wiesbaden)

11 April 2026 29	FC St. Pauli	0–5	Bayern Munich	Hamburg
18:30 UTC+2	Chima Fujita (yellow card) 52'	FCSP Report; Kicker Report	Musiala 9'; Laimer (yellow card) 19'; Goretzka 53'; Olise (yellow card) 52', (goal) 54'; Jackson 65'; Guerreiro 88'	Stadium: Millerntor-Stadion; Attendance: 29,546; Referee: Tobias Stieler (Sölden)

17 April 2026 30	FC St. Pauli	1–1	1. FC Köln	Hamburg
20:30 UTC+2	Mets 69'; Hountondji (yellow card) 71'; Ando (yellow card) 76'; Pereira Lage (yellow card) 87'; Sinani (yellow card) 90+6'	FCSP Report; Kicker Report	Waldschmidt 86' (pen.); El Mala (yellow card) 87'	Stadium: Millerntor-Stadion; Attendance: 29,546; Referee: Matthias Jöllenbeck (Freiburg im Breisgau)

25 April 2026 31	1. FC Heidenheim	2–0	FC St. Pauli	Heidenheim
15:30 UTC+2	Zivzivadze 3'; Dinkçi 82'	FCSP Report; Kicker Report	Kaars (yellow card) 76'	Stadium: Voith-Arena; Attendance: 15,000; Referee: Felix Zwayer (Berlin)

3 May 2026 32	FC St. Pauli	1–2	Mainz 05	Hamburg
15:30 UTC+2	Ceesay 87', (yellow card) 90+5'; Mets (yellow card) 89'; Metcalfe (yellow card) 90+1'	FCSP Report; Kicker Report	Tietz 6'; Mwene 40'; Batz (yellow card) 68'	Stadium: Millerntor-Stadion; Attendance: 29,546; Referee: Timo Gerach (Landau)

9 May 2026 33	RB Leipzig	2–1	FC St. Pauli	Leipzig
15:30 UTC+2	Lukeba (yellow card) 19'; Schlager 45'; Baumgartner (yellow card) 50'; Orbán 54'	FCSP Report; Kicker Report	Ceesay 86'	Stadium: Red Bull Arena; Attendance: 47,800; Referee: Benjamin Brand (Schwebheim)

16 May 2026 34	FC St. Pauli	1–3	VfL Wolfsburg	Hamburg
15:30 UTC+2	Ceesay 57', (yellow card) 88'; Chima Fujita (yellow card) 90+5'	FCSP Report; Kicker Report	Souza (yellow card) 18'; Daghim (yellow card) 33'; Koulierakis 37'; Vasilj 64' (o.g.); Eriksen (penalty missed) 77'; Pejčinović 80'; Shiogai (yellow card) 90+4'	Stadium: Millerntor-Stadion; Attendance: 29,546; Referee: Daniel Siebert (Berlin)

=== DFB-Pokal ===
16 August 2025 First round	Eintracht Norderstedt	0–0 (a.e.t.) (2–3 p)	FC St. Pauli	Hamburg (Note: The Eintracht Norderstedt v FC St. Pauli match will take place at the Millerntor-Stadion instead of Eintracht Norderstedt's home stadium.)
15:30 UTC+2	Bera (yellow card) 34'; Obushnyi (yellow card) 57'; Yago (yellow card) 96'; Kummerfeld (yellow card) 101'	DFB Report; FCSP Report; Kicker Report		Stadium: Millerntor-Stadion; Attendance: 28,946; Referee: Eric Weisbach (Halle (Saale))
	Penalties
	Koch (penalty missed); Frahm (penalty scored); Brendel (penalty missed); Gross (penalty scored); Behounek (penalty missed)		(penalty missed) Wahl; (penalty missed) Chima Fujita; (penalty scored) Oppie; (penalty scored) Sinani; (penalty scored) Nemeth

28 October 2025 Second round	FC St. Pauli	2–2 (a.e.t.) (8–7 p)	TSG Hoffenheim	Hamburg
20:45 UTC+2	Wahl 1'; Pyrka (yellow card) 21'; Blessin (yellow card) 39'; Ceesay (yellow card) 74'; Mets (yellow card) 86'; Pereira Lage (yellow card) 90+2', (goal) 120+2'; Saliakas (yellow card) 119'	DFB Report; FCSP Report; Kicker Report	Prömel (yellow card) 40', (goal) 47'; Hajdari (yellow card) 50'; Hranáč (yellow card) 76'; Kramarić 107' (pen.), (yellow card) 119'; Baumann (yellow card) 120+3'	Stadium: Millerntor-Stadion; Attendance: 28,123; Referee: Daniel Schlager (Gernsbach)
	Penalties
	Smith (penalty scored); Oppie (penalty scored); Kaars (penalty scored); Pereira Lage (penalty missed); Saliakas (penalty scored); Chima Fujita (penalty scored); Sands (penalty scored); Ceesay (penalty scored); Wahl (penalty scored)		(penalty missed) Kramarić; (penalty scored) Burger; (penalty scored) Bebou; (penalty scored) Avdullahu; (penalty scored) Bernardo; (penalty scored) Touré; (penalty scored) Kabak; (penalty scored) Tohumcu; (penalty missed) Hajdari

2 December 2025 Round of 16	Borussia Mönchengladbach	1–2	FC St. Pauli	Mönchengladbach
18:00 UTC+1	Tabaković 56'; Engelhardt (yellow card) 90+4'	DFB Report; FCSP Report; Kicker Report	Sands (yellow card) 6'; Kaars 43'; Oppie 83'; Irvine (yellow card) 90+4'	Stadium: Borussia-Park; Attendance: 48,104; Referee: Sven Jablonski (Bremen)

3 February 2026 Quarterfinal	Bayer Leverkusen	3–0	FC St. Pauli	Leverkusen
20:45 UTC+1	Terrier 32'; García (yellow card) 44'; Schick 63'; Hofmann 90+2'	DFB Report; FCSP Report; Kicker Report	Chima Fujita (yellow card) 19'; Ando (yellow card) 50'	Stadium: BayArena; Attendance: 30,210; Referee: Florian Badstübner (Nuremberg)

== Squad and statistics ==
As of 16 May 2026

No.	Pos	Player	1. Bundesliga		DFB-Pokal		Total	
No.	Pos	Player	Apps	Goals	Apps	Goals	Apps	Goals
1	GK	(Germany) Ben Voll	0	0	2	0	2	0
2	DF	(Greece) Manolis Saliakas	12+5	1	0+3	0	20	1
3	DF	(Estonia) Karol Mets	22+1	1	3	0	26	1
4	DF	(Austria) David Nemeth	0	0	1	0	1	0
5	DF	(Germany) Hauke Wahl	29+1	2	3	1	33	3
6	MF	(United States) James Sands	23+1	1	4	0	28	1
7	MF	(Australia) Jackson Irvine	18+6	0	1+1	0	26	0
8	DF	(Sweden) Eric Smith	26+1	2	3	0	30	2
9	FW	(The Gambia) Abdoulie Ceesay	0+20	3	0+4	0	24	3
10	FW	(Luxembourg) Danel Sinani	23+7	5	2+1	0	33	5
11	DF	(Poland) Arkadiusz Pyrka	30+1	0	4	0	35	0
14	DF	(Wales) Fin Stevens	0+1	0	0	0	1	0
15	DF	(Japan) Tomoya Ando	14+1	0	1	0	16	0
16	MF	(Japan) Joel Chima Fujita	31+1	1	4	0	36	1
18	FW	(Japan) Taichi Hara	0+4	0	0+1	0	5	0
19	FW	(Netherlands) Martijn Kaars	14+15	3	2+1	1	32	4
20	MF	(Norway) Mathias Rasmussen	8+5	0	1	0	14	0
21	DF	(Germany) Lars Ritzka	12+9	0	0+3	0	24	0
22	GK	(Bosnia and Herzegovina) Nikola Vasilj	34	0	2	0	36	0
23	DF	(Germany) Louis Oppie	17+6	1	4	1	27	2
24	MF	(Australia) Connor Metcalfe	3+22	0	1+2	0	28	0
25	DF	(Poland) Adam Dźwigała	14+5	1	0	0	19	1
26	FW	(Jamaica) Ricky-Jade Jones	3+6	2	0+1	0	10	2
27	FW	(Benin) Andréas Hountondji	15+6	4	2	0	23	4
28	FW	(Portugal) Mathias Pereira Lage	26+2	2	3+1	1	32	3
30	GK	(Austria) Simon Spari	0	0	0	0	0	0
34	DF	(Austria) Jannik Robatsch	0	0	0	0	0	0
42	MF	(Germany) Marwin Schmitz	0	0	0	0	0	0
44	MF	(Germany) Nick Schmidt	0	0	0	0	0	0
47	GK	(Canada) Emil Gazdov	0	0	0	0	0	0
Players transferred or loaned out during the season
17	FW	(England) Dapo Afolayan	1+6	0	1+1	0	9	0
20	MF	(Sweden) Erik Ahlstrand	0	0	0	0	0	0
