= Tomoya Ando =

Japanese footballer

Tomoya Ando 安藤 智哉
Personal information
- Date of birth: 10 January 1999 (age 27)
- Place of birth: Toyota, Aichi, Japan
- Height: 1.90 m (6 ft 3 in)
- Position: Defender

Team information
- Current team: FC St. Pauli
- Number: 15

Youth career
- SFC Umetsubodai
- 2011–2013: Umetsubodai Junior High School
- 2014–2016: Okazaki Josai High School

College career
Years	Team	Apps	(Gls)
2017–2020	Aichi Gakuin University		

Senior career*
Years	Team	Apps	(Gls)
2021–2023	FC Imabari	44	(7)
2023–2024	Oita Trinita	64	(2)
2025	Avispa Fukuoka	36	(4)
2026–	FC St. Pauli	20	(0)

International career^{‡}
2025–	Japan	3	(0)
- * Club domestic league appearances and goals as of 20 September 2026 ‡ National team caps and goals as of 14 November 2025

Tomoya Ando (安藤 智哉, Andō Tomoya; born 10 January 1999) is a Japanese professional footballer who plays as a defender for German 2. Bundesliga club FC St. Pauli and the Japan national team.

== Club career ==
=== Avispa Fukuoka ===
In 23 December 2024, it was announced that Ando would be joining J1 League club Avispa Fukuoka.

Ando scored 4 goals across 36 games in the 2025 J.League season. On 9 December 2025, Ando was selected as a nominee for the J.League MVP.

=== FC St. Pauli ===
On 1 January 2025, Ando signed with FC St. Pauli of the Bundesliga on an undisclosed transfer fee.

== International career ==
On 3 July 2025, Ando was selected to play for Japan in the 2025 EAFF E-1 Football Championship, becoming the first Avispa Fukuoka player to be selected since Yoshiteru Yamashita. Ando played against Hong Kong on 8 July, and also played the full duration of the final against South Korea, which Japan won 1–0.

Ando was selected for Japan for a friendly match against the United States, but withdrew due to injury.

== Career statistics ==
=== Club ===
As of match played 20 September 2026

Appearances and goals by club, season and competition
Club	Season	League			National cup (Note: Includes Emperor's Cup.)		League cup (Note: Includes J. League Cup.)		Other		Total	
Club	Season	Division	Apps	Goals	Apps	Goals	Apps	Goals	Apps	Goals	Apps	Goals
FC Imabari	2021	J3 League	15	1	1	0	–		–		16	1
FC Imabari	2022	J3 League	29	6	1	0	–		–		30	6
FC Imabari	Total		44	7	2	0	0	0	0	0	46	7
Oita Trinita	2023	J2 League	27	2	0	0	–		–		27	2
Oita Trinita	2024	J2 League	37	0	3	0	1	0	–		41	0
Oita Trinita	Total		64	2	3	0	1	0	0	0	68	2
Avispa Fukuoka	2025	J1 League	36	4	2	0	4	0	–		42	4
FC St. Pauli	2025–26	Bundesliga	15	0	1	0	–		–		16	0
FC St. Pauli	2026–27	2. Bundesliga	5	0	1	0	–		–		6	0
FC St. Pauli	Total		20	0	2	0	–		–		22	0
Career total			164	13	9	0	5	0	0	0	178	13

=== International ===
As of match played 14 November 2025

Appearances and goals by national team and year
National team	Year	Apps	Goals
Japan	2025	3	0
Total		3	0

== Honours ==
Japan

- EAFF Championship: 2025
