= Anders Smith =

Swedish footballer

Personal information
- Full name: Lars-Anders Smith
- Date of birth: 19 January 1968 (age 58)
- Position: Midfielder

Senior career*
Years	Team	Apps	(Gls)
1987–1997	Halmstads BK		
- * Club domestic league appearances and goals

Lars-Anders Smith (né Johansson; born 19 January 1968) is a Swedish former professional footballer who played as a midfielder.

== Personal life ==
His son Eric is also a footballer, he is currently playing for FC St. Pauli.
