= Lukas Krüger =

German footballer (born 2000)

Personal information
- Full name: Lukas Felix Krüger
- Date of birth: 20 January 2000 (age 26)
- Place of birth: Hamburg, Germany
- Height: 1.88 m (6 ft 2 in)
- Position: Forward

Team information
- Current team: Eintracht Norderstedt
- Number: 9

Youth career
- –2015: FC St. Pauli
- 2015–2019: RB Leipzig

Senior career*
Years	Team	Apps	(Gls)
2018–2019	RB Leipzig	0	(0)
2019–2020	BFC Dynamo	24	(3)
2020–2022	SV Meppen	56	(4)
2022–2023	FSV Zwickau	13	(1)
2024	SGV Freiberg	9	(3)
2024–	Eintracht Norderstedt	58	(19)
- * Club domestic league appearances and goals as of 22 September 2026

Lukas Felix Krüger (born 20 January 2000) is a German professional footballer who plays as a Forward for Eintracht Norderstedt.

== Club career ==
Krüger made his professional debut for RB Leipzig on 2 August 2018, coming on as a substitute in the 70th minute for Matheus Cunha in the UEFA Europa League qualifying match against Swedish club BK Häcken of the Allsvenskan, which finished as a 1–1 away draw.

In July 2020, Krüger joined 3. Liga club SV Meppen from Regionalliga Nordost side Berliner FC Dynamo having agreed a two-year contract.

On 10 October 2024, Krüger joined FC Eintracht Norderstedt 03.
