= Ben Voll =

German footballer

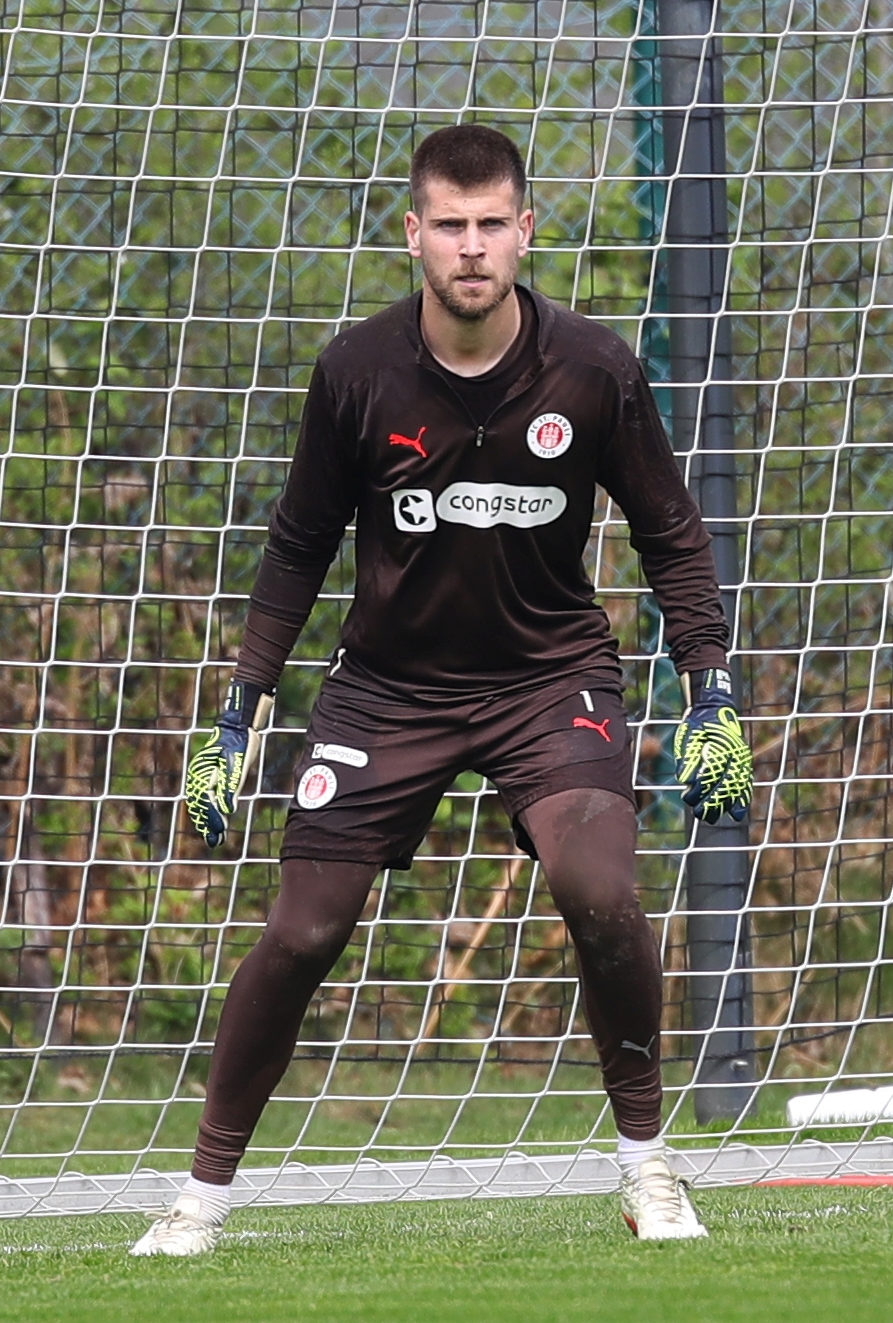
- Voll with FC St. Pauli in 2025

Personal information
- Full name: Ben Alexander Voll
- Date of birth: 9 December 2000 (age 25)
- Place of birth: Bergisch Gladbach, Germany
- Height: 1.95 m (6 ft 5 in)
- Position: Goalkeeper

Team information
- Current team: FC St. Pauli
- Number: 1

Youth career
- –2014: 1. FC Köln
- 2014–2015: 1. Jugend-Fußball-Schule Köln
- 2015–2018: Viktoria Köln
- 2018–2019: Alemannia Aachen

Senior career*
Years	Team	Apps	(Gls)
2019	Alemannia Aachen	0	(0)
2019–2022	Hansa Rostock	0	(0)
2019–2022	Hansa Rostock II	16	(0)
2022–2024	Viktoria Köln	68	(0)
2024–	FC St. Pauli	11	(0)
- * Club domestic league appearances and goals as of 20:30, 23 October 2026 (UTC)

Ben Alexander Voll (born 9 December 2000) is a German footballer who plays as a goalkeeper for 2. Bundesliga club FC St. Pauli.

== Career statistics ==
As of match played 23 October 2026

Appearances and goals by club, season and competition
Club	Season	League			DFB-Pokal		Other		Total	
Club	Season	Division	Apps	Goals	Apps	Goals	Apps	Goals	Apps	Goals
FC Hansa Rostock	2019–20	3. Liga	0	0	—		0 (Note: Appearances in Mecklenburg-Vorpommern Cup)	0	0	0
FC Hansa Rostock	2020–21	3. Liga	0	0	0	0	1 (Note: Appearances in Mecklenburg-Vorpommern Cup)	0	1	0
FC Hansa Rostock	2021–22	2. Bundesliga	0	0	0	0	—		0	0
FC Hansa Rostock	Total		0	0	0	0	1	0	1	0
FC Hansa Rostock II	2019–20	NOFV-Oberliga Nord	6	0	—		—		6	0
FC Hansa Rostock II	2020–21	NOFV-Oberliga Nord	3	0	—		—		3	0
FC Hansa Rostock II	2021–22	NOFV-Oberliga Nord	7	0	—		—		7	0
FC Hansa Rostock II	Total		16	0	—		—		16	0
FC Viktoria Köln	2022–23	3. Liga	36	0	1	0	4 (Note: Appearances in Middle Rhine Cup)	0	41	0
FC Viktoria Köln	2023–24	3. Liga	32	0	2	0	2 (Note: Appearances in Middle Rhine Cup)	0	36	0
FC Viktoria Köln	Total		68	0	3	0	6	0	77	0
FC St. Pauli	2024–25	Bundesliga	2	0	0	0	—		2	0
FC St. Pauli	2025–26	Bundesliga	0	0	2	0	—		2	0
FC St. Pauli	2026–27	2. Bundesliga	9	0	1	0	—		10	0
FC St. Pauli	Total		11	0	3	0	—		14	0
FC St. Pauli II	2024–25	Regionalliga Nord	3	0	—		—		3	0
Career total			98	0	6	0	7	0	111	0
