= 2022–23 Holstein Kiel season =

Holstein Kiel
2022–23 season
- Executive director: Wolfgang Schwenke
- President: Steffen Schneekloth
- Head coach: Marcel Rapp
- Stadium: Holstein-Stadion
- 2. Bundesliga: 8th
- DFB-Pokal: First round
| Home colours | Away colours |

The 2022–23 season was the 123rd in the history of Holstein Kiel and their sixth consecutive season in the second division. The club participated in the 2. Bundesliga and the DFB-Pokal.

== Players ==
As of 26 January 2023

Note: Flags indicate national team as defined under FIFA eligibility rules; some limited exceptions apply. Players may hold more than one non-FIFA nationality.

| No. | Pos. | Nation | Player |
|---|---|---|---|
| 1 | GK | GER | Tim Schreiber (on loan from RB Leipzig) |
| 2 | DF | DEN | Mikkel Kirkeskov |
| 3 | DF | GER | Marco Komenda |
| 4 | DF | GER | Patrick Erras |
| 5 | DF | GER | Stefan Thesker |
| 6 | MF | GER | Marcel Benger |
| 8 | MF | GER | Alexander Mühling |
| 9 | FW | AUT | Benedikt Pichler |
| 10 | MF | GER | Lewis Holtby |
| 11 | FW | GER | Fabian Reese |
| 14 | MF | GER | Steven Skrzybski |
| 16 | MF | GER | Philipp Sander |
| 17 | DF | GER | Timo Becker |
| 18 | FW | GHA | Kwasi Okyere Wriedt |
| 19 | DF | GER | Simon Lorenz |

| No. | Pos. | Nation | Player |
|---|---|---|---|
| 20 | FW | GER | Fiete Arp |
| 21 | GK | GER | Thomas Dähne |
| 22 | DF | SRB | Aleksandar Ignjovski |
| 23 | DF | GER | Julian Korb |
| 24 | DF | GER | Hauke Wahl (captain) |
| 25 | MF | GER | Marvin Schulz |
| 26 | MF | GER | Lucas Wolf |
| 27 | FW | GER | Finn Porath |
| 28 | FW | GER | Noah Awuku |
| 30 | FW | GER | Marvin Obuz |
| 31 | FW | GER | Fin Bartels |
| 32 | MF | GER | Jonas Sterner |
| 33 | GK | GER | Timon Weiner |
| 35 | GK | GER | Robin Himmelmann |
| 36 | FW | ISL | Hólmbert Friðjónsson |

=== Out on loan ===
Note: Flags indicate national team as defined under FIFA eligibility rules; some limited exceptions apply. Players may hold more than one non-FIFA nationality.

| No. | Pos. | Nation | Player |
|---|---|---|---|
| — | DF | USA | Nico Carrera (at FSV Zwickau until 30 June 2023) |
| — | MF | GER | Ahmet Arslan (at Dynamo Dresden until 30 June 2023) |

| No. | Pos. | Nation | Player |
|---|---|---|---|
| — | FW | GER | Joshua Mees (at Jahn Regensburg until 30 June 2023) |

== Pre-season and friendlies ==
Win Draw Loss

| 25 June 2022 Friendly | Holstein Kiel (Germany) | 2–0 | (Germany) FC St. Pauli | Kiel, Germany |
| 13:30 CEST (UTC+2) | | Report | | Stadium: Citti Fussball Park |

| 29 June 2022 Friendly | Holstein Kiel (Germany) | 2–2 | (Azerbaijan) Qarabağ | St. Ulrich am Pillersee, Austria |
| 12:00 CEST (UTC+2) | | Report | | Stadium: Sportplatz St. Ulrich |

| 2 July 2022 Friendly | Wolfsberger AC (Austria) | 0–1 | (Germany) Holstein Kiel | Maria Alm, Germany |
| 16:00 CEST (UTC+2) | | Report | | Stadium: Sportplatz Maria Alm |

| 22 September 2022 Friendly | Eintracht Braunschweig (Germany) | 7–0 | (Germany) Holstein Kiel | Rotenburg an der Wümme, Germany |
| 14:00 CEST (UTC+2) | Lauberbach 7', 35', 58', 69'; Peña Zauner 45'; Pherai 47', 60+1' | Report | | Stadium: Stadion In der Ahe; Attendance: 0 |

| 7 January 2023 Friendly | Holstein Kiel (Germany) | 5–3 | (Germany) VfL Osnabrück | Kiel, Germany |
| 13:00 CEST (UTC+2) | Arp 4'; Skrzybski 6'; Holtby 29'; Bartels 62', 99' | Report | Traoré 19'; Simakala 58'; Putaro 74' | Stadium: Citti Fussball Park |
Note: Match was played in four 30-minute periods

| 11 January 2023 Friendly | Holstein Kiel (Germany) | 1–1 | (Romania) CFR Cluj | Oliva, Spain |
| 15:15 CEST (UTC+2) | Mühling 75' | Report | Petrila 67' | Stadium: Oliva Nova Golf & Beach Resort Campo 1 |

| 14 January 2023 Friendly | Holstein Kiel (Germany) | 1–2 | (Germany) Arminia Bielefeld | Oliva, Spain |
| 15:00 CEST (UTC+2) | Wriedt (penalty missed) 56'; Holtby 75' | Report | Hack 7'; Serra 67' | Stadium: Oliva Nova Golf & Beach Resort Campo 1 |
Note: Match was played in four 30-minute periods

== Competitions ==
=== Overall record ===
| Competition | First match | Last match | Starting round | Final position | Record | | | | | | | |
| Competition | First match | Last match | Starting round | Final position | Pld | W | D | L | GF | GA | GD | Win % |
|---|---|---|---|---|---|---|---|---|---|---|---|---|
| 2. Bundesliga | 16 July 2022 | 28 May 2023 | Matchday 1 | | 34 | 12 | 10 | 12 | 58 | 61 | −3 | 35.29 |
| DFB-Pokal | 31 July 2022 | | First round | First round | 1 | 0 | 1 | 0 | 0 | 0 | +0 | 0.00 |
| Total | | | | | 35 | 12 | 11 | 12 | 58 | 61 | −3 | 34.29 |

Source: Soccerway

=== 2. Bundesliga ===
==== League table ====
| Pos | Team | Pld | W | D | L | GF | GA | GD | Pts |
|---|---|---|---|---|---|---|---|---|---|
| 6 | SC Paderborn | 34 | 16 | 7 | 11 | 68 | 44 | +24 | 55 |
| 7 | Karlsruher SC | 34 | 13 | 7 | 14 | 56 | 53 | +3 | 46 |
| 8 | Holstein Kiel | 34 | 12 | 10 | 12 | 58 | 61 | −3 | 46 |
| 9 | 1. FC Kaiserslautern | 34 | 11 | 12 | 11 | 47 | 48 | −1 | 45 |
| 10 | Hannover 96 | 34 | 12 | 8 | 14 | 50 | 55 | −5 | 44 |

Source: DFB
Rules for classification: 1) Points; 2) Goal difference; 3) Goals scored; 4) Head-to-head results; 5) Head-to-head away goals scored; 6) Away goals scored; 7) Play-off.

==== Results summary ====
| Overall | | | | | | | | Home | | | | | | Away | | | | | |
| Pld | W | D | L | GF | GA | GD | Pts | W | D | L | GF | GA | GD | W | D | L | GF | GA | GD |
|---|---|---|---|---|---|---|---|---|---|---|---|---|---|---|---|---|---|---|---|
| 34 | 12 | 10 | 12 | 58 | 61 | −3 | 46 | 6 | 4 | 7 | 29 | 29 | 0 | 6 | 6 | 5 | 29 | 32 | −3 |

Source: DFB

==== Results by round ====
| Round | 1 | 2 | 3 | 4 | 5 | 6 | 7 | 8 | 9 | 10 | 11 | 12 | 13 | 14 | 15 | 16 | 17 | 18 | 19 | 20 | 21 | 22 | 23 | 24 | 25 | 26 | 27 | 28 | 29 | 30 | 31 | 32 | 33 | 34 |
|---|---|---|---|---|---|---|---|---|---|---|---|---|---|---|---|---|---|---|---|---|---|---|---|---|---|---|---|---|---|---|---|---|---|---|
| Ground | A | H | A | H | A | H | A | H | A | H | A | H | A | H | A | A | H | H | A | H | A | H | A | H | A | H | A | H | A | H | A | H | H | A |
| Result | D | D | W | W | L | W | D | L | L | D | W | W | D | L | W | D | D | W | L | L | W | D | D | L | D | L | W | W | L | L | L | W | L | W |
| Position | 15 | 15 | 10 | 5 | 8 | 7 | 7 | 8 | 8 | 9 | 9 | 6 | 7 | 8 | 8 | 8 | 8 | 8 | 8 | 8 | 8 | 8 | 8 | 8 | 8 | 8 | 8 | 8 | 10 | 10 | 10 | 8 | 10 | 8 |

Source: DFB
A = Away; H = Home; W = Win; D = Draw; L = Loss

==== Matches ====
The league fixtures were announced on 17 June 2022.

| 16 July 2022 1 | Greuther Fürth | 2–2 | Holstein Kiel | Fürth |
| 13:00 CEST (UTC+2) | Green 48'; Tillman 76' | | Becker 29'; Bieler 80' (pen.) | Stadium: Sportpark Ronhof Thomas Sommer |

| 23 July 2022 2 | Holstein Kiel | 2–2 | 1. FC Kaiserslautern | Kiel |
| 13:00 CEST (UTC+2) | Reese 51', 57' | | Hanslik 32'; Boyd 62' | Stadium: Holstein-Stadion |

| 7 August 2022 3 | 1. FC Magdeburg | 1–2 | Holstein Kiel | Magdeburg |
| 13:30 CEST (UTC+2) | Lawrence (yellow card) 34' (yellow-red card) 56'; Ceka 43'; Cacutalua (yellow card) 67'; Reimann (yellow card) 85' | Report | Komenda 17'; Porath (yellow card) 29'; Arp (yellow card) 32'; Pichler 59' (pen.); Schulz (yellow card) 80'; Mühling (yellow card) 90+3' | Stadium: MDCC-Arena; Attendance: 19,511; Referee: (Germany) Timo Gerach |

| 13 August 2022 4 | Holstein Kiel | 3–0 | Eintracht Braunschweig | Kiel |
| 13:00 CEST (UTC+2) | Skrzybski 12' 73'; Becker (yellow card) 25'; Arp (yellow card) 42'; Pichler 82' | Report | Nikolaou (yellow card) 36'; Kijewski (yellow card) 45+2' | Stadium: Holstein-Stadion; Attendance: 11,575; Referee: (Germany) Wolfgang Haslberger |

| 20 August 2022 5 | SC Paderborn | 7–2 | Holstein Kiel | Paderborn |
| 13:00 CEST (UTC+2) | Muslija 7' (pen.); Justvan 13'; Obermair 25'; Platte 29' 38'; Pieringer 52'; Srbeny 80'; Carls (yellow card) 84' | Report | Pichler (yellow card) 6'; Korb 9'; Sander (yellow card) 37'; Erras (yellow card) 40'; Skrzybski 45+1'; Arp (yellow card) 66' | Stadium: Home Deluxe Arena; Attendance: 9,641; Referee: (Germany) Florian Exner |

| 28 August 2022 6 | Holstein Kiel | 1–0 | SV Sandhausen | Kiel |
| 13:30 CEST (UTC+2) | Skrzybski 72'; Schulz (yellow card) 78'; Becker (yellow card) 86' | Report | Zenga (yellow card) 59'; Esswein (yellow card) 73' | Stadium: Holstein-Stadion; Attendance: 10,006; Referee: (Germany) Alexander Sather |

| 3 September 2022 7 | SSV Jahn Regensburg | 0–0 | Holstein Kiel | Regensburg |
| 13:00 CEST (UTC+2) | Caliskaner (yellow card) 44'; Makridis (yellow card) 50' | Report | | Stadium: Jahnstadion Regensburg; Attendance: 8,893; Referee: (Germany) Florian Lechner |

| 9 September 2022 8 | Holstein Kiel | 2–3 | Hamburger SV | Kiel |
| 18:30 CEST (UTC+2) | Heyer 90+2' (o.g.); Bartels 90+3' | Report | Glatzel 39'; Schonlau (yellow card) 51'; Heyer 69'; Muheim (yellow card) 79'; Reis 85' | Stadium: Holstein-Stadion; Attendance: 15,034; Referee: (Germany) Daniel Siebert (referee) |

| 17 September 2022 9 | Arminia Bielefeld | 4–2 | Holstein Kiel | Bielefeld |
| 13:00 CEST (UTC+2) | Hack 1'; Serra 36'; Rzatkowski (yellow card) 42'; Okugawa 48'; Lepinjica (yellow card) 60'; Lasme 85'; Fraisl (yellow card) 88' | Report | Sander (yellow card) 57'; Mühling 59'; Bartels 68'; Wahl (yellow card) 86' | Stadium: SchücoArena; Attendance: 19,460; Referee: (Germany) Aarne Aarnink |

| 1 October 2022 10 | Holstein Kiel | 1–1 | Hansa Rostock | Kiel |
| 13:00 CEST (UTC+2) | Reese 28' (pen.); Kirkeskov (yellow card) 64'; Mühling (yellow card) 76' | Report | Fröde (yellow card) 30'; Dressel (yellow card) 52'; van Drongelen (yellow card) 72'; Hinterseer 88' | Stadium: Holstein-Stadion; Attendance: 12,492; Referee: (Germany) Martin Thomsen |

| 9 October 2022 11 | 1. FC Nürnberg | 2–3 | Holstein Kiel | Nürnberg |
| 13:30 CEST (UTC+2) | Templemann 39'; Fofana (yellow card) 82'; Daferner 90+4' | Report | Korb (yellow card) 4'; Erras (yellow card) 33'; Kirkeskov (yellow card) 34'; Skrzybski 62' 79'; Reese 65'; Okyere Wriedt (yellow card) 82' | Stadium: Max-Morlock-Stadion; Attendance: 28,518; Referee: (Germany) Timo Gerach |

| 16 October 2022 12 | Holstein Kiel | 3–1 | 1. FC Heidenheim | Kiel |
| 13:30 CEST (UTC+2) | Skrzybski 45' 51'; Okyere Wriedt 66' | Report | Maloney (yellow card) 25'; Thomalla 31' | Stadium: Holstein-Stadion; Attendance: 9,936; Referee: (Germany) Patrick Alt |

| 21 October 2022 13 | Darmstadt 98 | 1–1 | Holstein Kiel | Darmstadt |
| 18:30 CEST (UTC+2) | Karić (yellow card) 55'; Mehlem (yellow card) 67'; Zimmermann (yellow card) 71'; Bader 72' | Report | Skrzybski 35'; Porath (yellow card) 49'; Kirkeskov (yellow card) 72' | Stadium: Merck-Stadion am Böllenfalltor; Attendance: 14,650; Referee: (Germany) Christian Dingert |

| 29 October 2022 14 | Holstein Kiel | 1–2 | Fortuna Düsseldorf | Kiel |
| 13:00 CEST (UTC+2) | Erras (yellow card) 25'; Obuz (yellow card) 50'; Skrzybski 70' | Report | Appelkamp 42'; Sobottka (yellow card) 53' (yellow-red card) 90+3'; Kownacki 82' (pen.); Klaus (yellow card) 89' | Stadium: Holstein-Stadion; Attendance: 10,000; Referee: (Germany) Robert Schröder |

| 5 November 2022 15 | Karlsruher SC | 1–4 | Holstein Kiel | Karlsruhe |
| 13:00 CET (UTC+1) | Rapp 72' | Report | Breithaupt 15' (o.g.); Okyere Wriedt 30' 90+2'; Reese 67' | Stadium: BBBank Wildpark; Attendance: 15,219; Referee: (Germany) Max Burda |

| 8 November 2022 16 | FC St. Pauli | 0–0 | Holstein Kiel | Hamburg |
| 18:30 CET (UTC+1) | Aremu (yellow card) 73'; Beifus (yellow card) 90+1' | Report | | Stadium: Millerntor-Stadion; Attendance: 29,546; Referee: (Germany) Alexander Sather |

| 11 November 2022 17 | Holstein Kiel | 1–1 | Hannover 96 | Kiel |
| 18:30 CET (UTC+1) | Bartels 9'; Wahl (yellow card) 34'; Schulz (yellow card) 35'; Lorenz (yellow card) 90' | Report | Teuchert 16' (yellow card) 61'; Kunze (yellow card) 69'; Weydandt (yellow card) 76'; Leopold (yellow card) 78' | Stadium: Holstein-Stadion; Attendance: 13,744; Referee: (Germany) Aarne Aarnink |

| 28 January 2023 18 | Holstein Kiel | 2–1 | Greuther Fürth | Kiel |
| 13:00 CET (UTC+1) | Wahl 46'; Becker (yellow card) 66'; Lorenz 84' | Report | Abiama 30'; Christiansen (yellow card) 90+2' | Stadium: Holstein-Stadion; Attendance: 11,438; Referee: (Germany) Florian Exner |

| 4 February 2023 19 | 1. FC Kaiserslautern | 2–1 | Holstein Kiel | Kaiserslautern |
| 13:00 CET (UTC+1) | Hanslik 6'; Niehues (yellow card) 38'; Zimmer (yellow card) 45'; Boyd 71'; Tomiak (yellow card) 76' | Report | Porath 30'; Wahl (yellow card) 38'; Becker (yellow card) 66'; Arp (yellow card) 90+2' | Stadium: Fritz-Walter-Stadion; Attendance: 39,020; Referee: (Germany) Martin Thomsen |

| 11 February 2023 20 | Holstein Kiel | 2–3 | 1. FC Magdeburg | Kiel |
| 13:00 CET (UTC+1) | Erras 33'; Porath (yellow card) 39'; Arp 54'; Reese (yellow card) 69'; schulz (yellow card) 72'; Sander (yellow card) 76'; Schreiber (yellow card) 79'; Wahl (yellow card) 85' | Report | Kwarteng (yellow card) 1' (goal) 86'; Ullmann (yellow card) 40'; Daniel Elfadli 45'; El Hankouri (yellow card) 67'; Bockhorn 70'; Atik (yellow card) 79'; Ceka (yellow card) 79'; Daniel Heber (yellow card) 88' | Stadium: Holstein-Stadion; Attendance: 11,161; Referee: (Germany) Florian Heft |

| 17 February 2023 21 | Eintracht Braunschweig | 2–3 | Holstein Kiel | Braunschweig |
| 18:30 CET (UTC+1) | Fejzić (yellow card) 22'; Multhaup 57'; Wiebe 69'; Wintzheimer (yellow card) 90'; Nikolaou (yellow card) 90+3' | Report | Reese 14'; Friðjónsson 22'; Schulz (yellow card) 31'; Becker 48'; Wahl (yellow card) 57'; Skrzybski (yellow card) 75' | Stadium: Eintracht-Stadion; Attendance: 18,747; Referee: (Germany) Nicolas Winter |

| 25 February 2023 22 | Holstein Kiel | 1–1 | SC Paderborn | Kiel |
| 13:00 CET (UTC+1) | Erras (yellow card) 62'; Reese 66' (pen.) | Report | Schallenberg (yellow card) 21'; Rohr 31'; Humphreys (yellow card) 70' | Stadium: Holstein-Stadion; Attendance: 12,469; Referee: (Germany) Wolfgang Haslberger |

| 4 March 2023 23 | SV Sandhausen | 1–1 | Holstein Kiel | Sandhausen |
| 13:00 CET (UTC+1) | Al Ghaddioui (yellow card) 82'; Höhn (yellow card) 86'; Sicker (yellow card) 87'; Evina 90+5' | Report | Wahl 47'; Lorenz (yellow card) 87' | Stadium: BWT-Stadion am Hardtwald; Attendance: 3,603; Referee: (Germany) Robert Hartmann (referee) |

| 12 March 2023 24 | Holstein Kiel | 1–2 | SSV Jahn Regensburg | Kiel |
| 13:30 CET (UTC+1) | Skrzybski 45+4'; Kirkeskov (yellow card) 74'; Erras (yellow card) 90+3' | Report | Idrizi (yellow card) 28'; Gimber (yellow card) 40'; Mees (yellow card) 43'; Caliskaner 45'; Saller (yellow card) 78'; Owusu 87' | Stadium: Holstein-Stadion; Attendance: 10,698; Referee: (Germany) Alexander Sather |

| 18 March 2023 25 | Hamburger SV | 0–0 | Holstein Kiel | Hamburg |
| 13:00 CET (UTC+1) | Schonlau (yellow card) 64'; Katterbach (yellow card) 87'; Heyer (yellow card) 90' | Report | Porath (yellow card) 45'; Komenda (yellow card) 50'; Wahl (yellow card) 72'; Arp (yellow card) 87' | Stadium: Volksparkstadion; Attendance: 57,000; Referee: (Germany) Benjamin Brand |

| 2 April 2023 26 | Holstein Kiel | 2–3 | Arminia Bielefeld | Kiel |
| 13:30 CET (UTC+1) | Skrzybski 32'; Erras (yellow card) 50'; Friðjónsson 67' (yellow card) 89'; Lorenz (yellow card) 78' | Report | Jäkel 11'; Hack 29'; Fraisl (yellow card) 34'; Okugawa 55'; Guilherme Ramos (yellow card) 70' | Stadium: Holstein-Stadion; Attendance: 10,500; Referee: (Germany) Timo Gerach |

| 9 April 2023 27 | Hansa Rostock | 2–3 | Holstein Kiel | Rostock |
| 13:30 CET (UTC+1) | van Drongelen 12' (yellow card) 84'; Hinterseer 53' | Report | Wahl (yellow card) 16'; Reese 44'; Sander 45+2'; Holtby 47' | Stadium: Ostseestadion; Attendance: 24,300; Referee: (Germany) Nicolas Winter |

=== DFB-Pokal ===
| 31 July 2022 First round | Waldhof Mannheim | 0–0 (a.e.t.) (5–3 p) | Holstein Kiel | Mannheim |
| 18:01 CEST (UTC+2) | | Report | | Stadium: Carl-Benz-Stadion; Attendance: 13,137; Referee: Tobias Reichel |
| | Penalties |
| | Bahn (penalty scored); Rossipal (penalty scored); Russo (penalty scored); Sohm (penalty scored); Wagner (penalty scored) | | (penalty scored) Erras; (penalty scored) Komenda; (penalty missed) Schulz; (penalty scored) Okyere Wriedt |
