= Manolis Saliakas =

Greek footballer (born 1996)

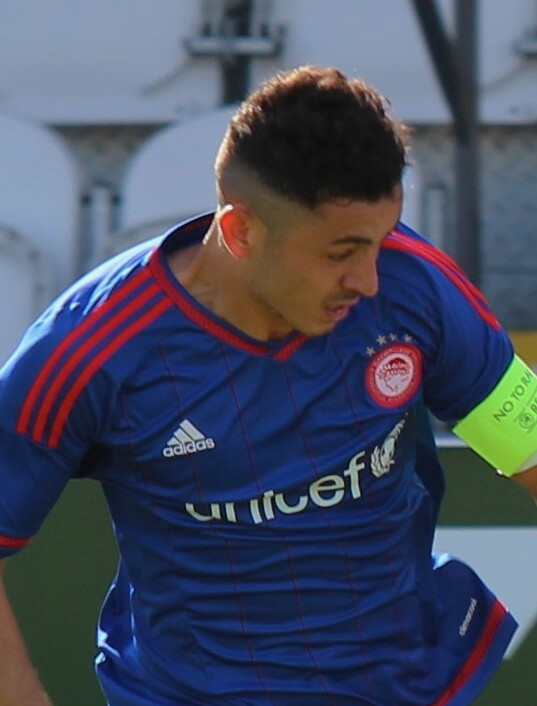
- Saliakas with Olympiacos in 2015

Personal information
- Full name: Emmanouil Saliakas
- Date of birth: 12 September 1996 (age 30)
- Place of birth: Heraklion, Crete, Greece
- Height: 1.78 m (5 ft 10 in)
- Position: Right-back

Team information
- Current team: Olympiacos
- Number: 2

Youth career
- 2013: Ergotelis
- 2013–2014: Olympiacos

Senior career*
Years	Team	Apps	(Gls)
2014–2019	Olympiacos	1	(0)
2016–2017	→ Karmiotissa (loan)	30	(0)
2017–2019	→ Chania (loan)	45	(7)
2019–2020	Lamia	24	(1)
2020–2022	PAS Giannina	66	(1)
2022–2026	St. Pauli	111	(9)
2026–	Olympiacos	6	(1)

International career^{‡}
2011–2013	Greece U17	8	(1)
2013–2014	Greece U18	4	(0)
2014–2015	Greece U19	17	(1)
2015–2018	Greece U21	15	(3)
2021–	Greece	7	(0)
- * Club domestic league appearances and goals as of 22 November 2026 ‡ National team caps and goals as of 4 October 2026

Manolis Saliakas (Greek: Μανώλης Σάλιακας; born 12 September 1996) is a Greek professional footballer who plays as a right-back for Super League club Olympiacos and the Greece national team.

== Club career ==
Saliakas began his football career attending the Ergotelis Youth Academy, the youth system of his local Super League Greece club Ergotelis. Already capped with the Greece U17 national team, he was spotted by Olympiacos' scouts, who arranged his transfer to the Super League champions in the winter of 2013.

=== Olympiacos ===
Saliakas played little for Olympiacos and moved to Limassol-based side Karmiotissa on loan, who had been newly promoted to the Cypriot First Division. Having made 31 appearances, he returned to Greece joining Chania of the Football League Greece on a two-year loan. He scored seven goals in 50 games.

=== Lamia ===
On 12 July 2019, facing competition at Olympiacos for his playing position from Omar Elabdellaoui, Bruno Gaspar and Vasilis Torosidis, Saliakas moved to Lamia on a free transfer. He made 29 consecutive appearances in all competitions.

=== PAS Giannina ===
On 31 July 2020, he signed a contract with PAS Giannina in Ioannina. He played against Panathinaikos where he got into the semi-final of the Greek Cup in the season 2020–21. With PAS Giannina he achieved 6th place in the 2021–22 Super League Greece.

=== St. Pauli ===
In June 2022 Saliakas moved to St. Pauli.

=== Return to Olympiacos ===
In 2026, it was revealed that Saliakas would return to Olympiacos.

== International career ==
Saliakas made his debut for Greece on 3 June 2021 in a friendly against Belgium. He replaced Thanasis Androutsos in the 80th minute.

== Career statistics ==
=== Club ===
As of match played 25 April 2026

Appearances and goals by club, season and competition
Club	Season	League			National cup (Note: Includes Greek Cup, Cypriot Cup, DFB-Pokal)		Continental		Other		Total	
Club	Season	Division	Apps	Goals	Apps	Goals	Apps	Goals	Apps	Goals	Apps	Goals
Olympiacos	2013–14	Super League Greece	1	0	1	0	0	0	—		2	0
Olympiacos	2014–15	Super League Greece	0	0	1	0	0	0	—		1	0
Olympiacos	2015–16	Super League Greece	0	0	3	0	0	0	—		3	0
Olympiacos	Total		1	0	5	0	0	0	—		6	0
Karmiotissa (loan)	2016–17	Cypriot First Division	30	0	1	0	—		—		31	0
Chania (loan)	2017–18	Football League	26	4	0	0	—		—		26	4
Chania (loan)	2018–19	Football League	19	2	4	0	—		—		23	2
Chania (loan)	Total		45	6	4	0	—		—		49	6
Lamia	2019–20	Super League Greece	24	1	5	1	—		—		29	2
PAS Giannina	2020–21	Super League Greece	31	0	5	1	—		—		36	1
PAS Giannina	2021–22	Super League Greece	35	1	1	0	—		—		36	1
PAS Giannina	Total		66	1	6	1	—		—		72	2
St. Pauli	2022–23	2. Bundesliga	33	4	1	0	—		—		34	4
St. Pauli	2023–24	2. Bundesliga	31	2	4	0	—		—		35	2
St. Pauli	2024–25	Bundesliga	30	2	1	0	—		—		31	2
St. Pauli	2025–26	Bundesliga	17	1	3	0	—		—		20	1
St. Pauli	Total		111	9	9	0	—		—		120	9
Olympiacos	2026–27	Super League Greece	0	0	0	0	1	0			1	0
Career total			277	17	30	2	1	0	—		308	19

=== International ===
As of match played 1 October 2026

Appearances and goals by national team and year
National team	Year	Apps	Goals
Greece	2021	2	0
Greece	2022	0	0
Greece	2023	1	0
Greece	2024	1	0
Greece	2025	0	0
Greece	2026	2	0
Total		6	0

== Honours ==
Olympiacos

- Super League Greece: 2013–14, 2014–15, 2015–16
- Greek Cup: 2014–15

FC St. Pauli

- 2.Bundesliga : 2023–24

Individual

- Super League Greece Team of the Season: 2021–22
