= Abdoulie Ceesay =

Gambian footballer (born 2004)

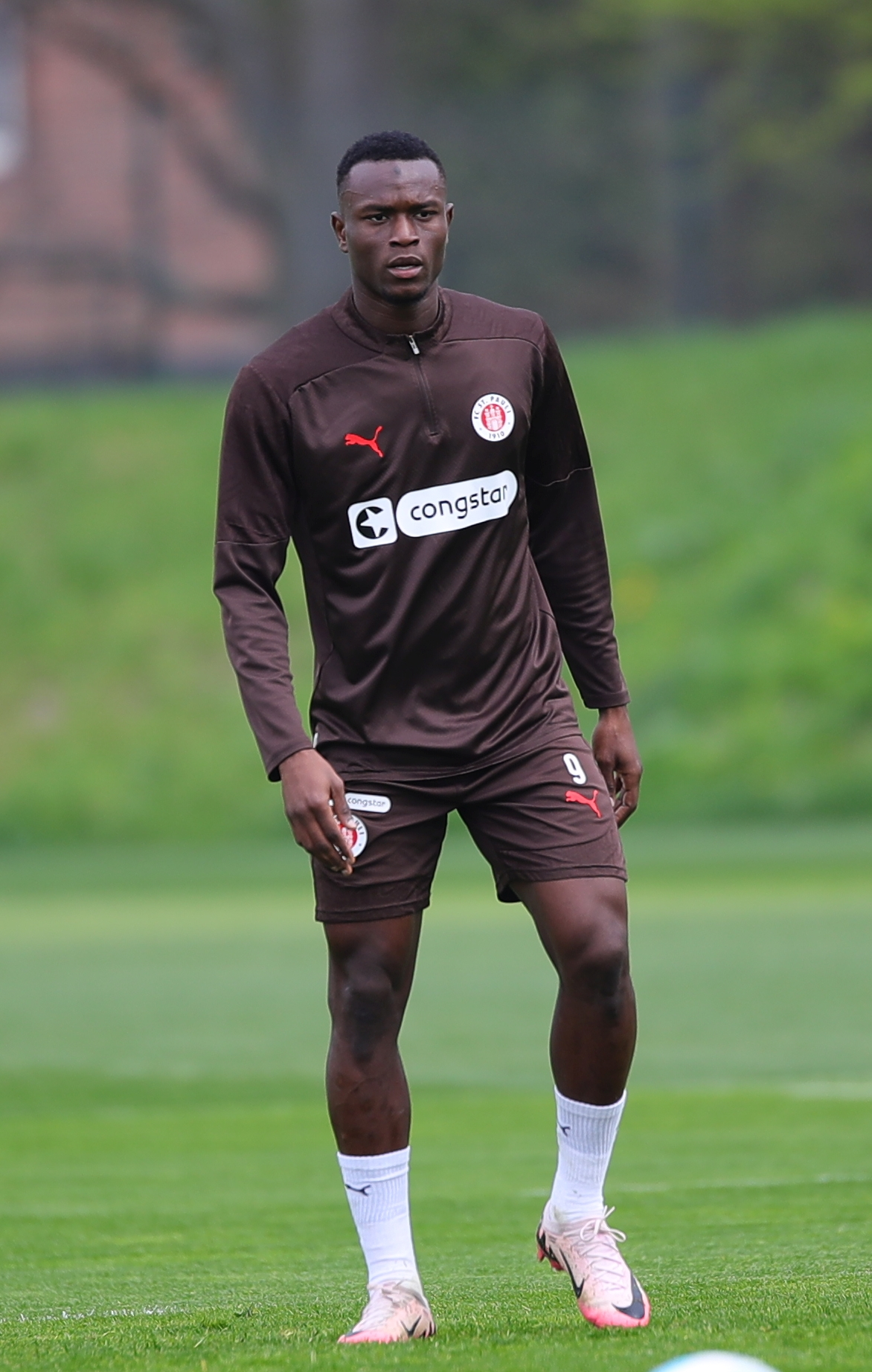
- Ceesay in 2025

Personal information
- Date of birth: 5 January 2004 (age 22)
- Place of birth: The Gambia
- Height: 1.85 m (6 ft 1 in)
- Position: Forward

Team information
- Current team: FC St. Pauli
- Number: 9

Senior career*
Years	Team	Apps	(Gls)
–2024	Real de Banjul		
2024	→ Paide Linnameeskond (loan)	15	(13)
2025–	FC St. Pauli	34	(6)

International career^{‡}
2024–	Gambia	9	(3)
- * Club domestic league appearances and goals as of 20:30, 23 October 2026 (UTC) ‡ National team caps and goals as of 25 September 2026

Abdoulie Ceesay (born 5 January 2004) is a Gambian professional footballer who plays as a forward for FC St. Pauli.

== Career ==
Ceesay started his career with Gambian side Real de Banjul, helping the club win the league title. In 2024, he was sent on loan to Estonian side Paide Linnameeskond. Subsequently, he signed for Bundesliga side FC St. Pauli in 2025, becoming the first player to transfer directly from an Estonian side to a Bundesliga side. On 15 January 2025, he debuted for the club during a 1–0 away loss to VfL Bochum in the league.

== Style of play ==
Ceesay plays as a forward and is known for his speed and strength. German newspaper Hamburger Morgenpost wrote in 2025 that "Ceesay's style of play certainly has parallels to that of [German footballer] Johannes Eggestein; he also likes to take part in the build-up, drops back, demands the ball".

== Career statistics ==
=== Club ===
As of match played 23 October 2026

Appearances and goals by club, season and competition
Club	Season	League			National cup		Europe		Other		Total	
Club	Season	Division	Apps	Goals	Apps	Goals	Apps	Goals	Apps	Goals	Apps	Goals
Paide Linnameeskond (loan)	2024	Meistriliiga	15	13	1	0	—		—		16	13
FC St. Pauli	2024–25	Bundesliga	7	0	0	0	—		—		7	0
FC St. Pauli	2025–26	Bundesliga	20	3	4	0	—		—		24	3
FC St. Pauli	2026–27	2. Bundesliga	7	3	0	0	—		—		7	3
FC St. Pauli	Total		34	6	4	0	—		—		38	6
Career total			49	19	5	0	0	0	0	0	54	19

=== International ===
As of match played 25 September 2026

Appearances and goals by national team and year
National team	Year	Apps	Goals
Gambia	2024	3	1
Gambia	2025	5	2
Gambia	2026	2	0
Total		9	3

Scores and results list Benin's goal tally first, score column indicates score after each Ceesay goal.

No.	Date	Venue	Opponent	Score	Result	Competition
1	18 November 2024	Hammadi Agrebi Stadium, Radès, Tunisia	Tunisia	1–0	1–0	2025 Africa Cup of Nations qualification
2	18 November 2025	Jaber Al-Ahmad International Stadium, Kuwait City, Kuwait	Kuwait	1–0	2–2	Friendly
3	18 November 2025	Jaber Al-Ahmad International Stadium, Kuwait City, Kuwait	Kuwait	2–0	2–2	Friendly
