= Tobias Stieler =

German football referee

- Born: 2 July 1981 (age 45); Obertshausen, West Germany
- Other occupation: Jurist

Domestic
Years	League	Role
2004–	DFB	Referee
2009–	2. Bundesliga	Referee
2012–	Bundesliga	Referee

International
Years	League	Role
2014–2026	FIFA listed	Referee

Tobias Stieler (born 2 July 1981) is a German football referee. He referees for SG Rosenhöhe of the Hessian Football Association. He is a FIFA-listed referee.

== Refereeing career ==
Stieler has been a DFB referee since 2004, a Bundesliga referee since 2012, and a FIFA referee since 2014.

On 2 October 2025 he officiated at a Europa League match between Celtic and Braga in Glasgow and disallowed a crucial equalizer by home club Celtic after a two-minute VAR review "despite no handball being evident on television replays."

In 2026, Stieler announced his decision to leave the FIFA list of international referees at the end of the year. From 2027, he will continue refereeing matches in domestic competitions in Germany.

== Personal life ==
Stieler lives in Sölden near Freiburg im Breisgau and works as lawyer.

== See also ==
- List of football referees
