= Eric Smith (Swedish footballer) =

Swedish footballer (born 1997)

- Smith with Sweden in 2026

Personal information
- Full name: Eric Anders Smith
- Date of birth: 8 January 1997 (age 29)
- Place of birth: Halmstad, Sweden
- Height: 1.92 m (6 ft 4 in)
- Position: Centre-back

Team information
- Current team: FC St. Pauli
- Number: 8

Youth career
- 2002–2014: Halmstads BK

Senior career*
Years	Team	Apps	(Gls)
2014–2015	Halmstads BK	36	(1)
2016–2018	IFK Norrköping	43	(0)
2018–2021	Gent	2	(0)
2019	→ Tromsø (loan)	11	(0)
2020	→ IFK Norrköping (loan)	27	(0)
2021	→ FC St. Pauli (loan)	5	(0)
2021–	FC St. Pauli	136	(6)

International career^{‡}
2013–2014	Sweden U17	6	(0)
2014–2015	Sweden U19	8	(0)
2026–	Sweden	5	(0)
- * Club domestic league appearances and goals as of 20:30, 23 October 2026 (UTC) ‡ National team caps and goals as of 23:45, 17 November 2026 (UTC)

Eric Anders Smith (born 8 January 1997) is a Swedish professional footballer who plays as a centre-back for 2. Bundesliga club FC St. Pauli and the Sweden national team.

== Club career ==
In January 2016, Smith joined Swedish team IFK Norrköping, and moved abroad in June 2018 signing with Gent.

Smith joined 2. Bundesliga club FC St. Pauli on loan for the second half of the 2020–21 season. FC St. Pauli secured an option to sign him permanently.

== International career ==
On 12 May 2026, Smith was named in the Sweden squad for the 2026 FIFA World Cup. Smith made his full international debut on 1 June 2026 in a friendly 1–3 loss against Norway, playing for 45 minutes as a centre-back before being replaced by Alexander Bernhardsson.

== Personal life ==
Smith was born in Sweden, and his father Anders is a former footballer.

== Career statistics ==
=== Club ===
As of match played 23 October 2026

Appearances and goals by club, season and competition
Club	Season	League			Cup		Continental		Other		Total	
Club	Season	Division	Apps	Goals	Apps	Goals	Apps	Goals	Apps	Goals	Apps	Goals
Halmstads BK	2014	Allsvenskan	9	1	4	0	—		—		13	1
Halmstads BK	2015	Allsvenskan	27	0	—		—		—		27	0
Halmstads BK	2016	Allsvenskan	—		1	0	—		—		1	0
Halmstads BK	Total		36	1	5	0	—		—		41	1
IFK Norrköping	2016	Allsvenskan	10	0	1	0	—		—		11	0
IFK Norrköping	2017	Allsvenskan	24	0	6	0	2	0	—		32	0
IFK Norrköping	2018	Allsvenskan	9	0	4	0	4	0	—		17	0
IFK Norrköping	Total		43	0	11	0	6	0	—		60	0
Gent	2018–19	Belgian Pro League	2	0	1	0	—		—		3	0
Tromsø (loan)	2019	Eliteserien	11	0	—		—		—		11	0
IFK Norrköping (loan)	2020	Allsvenskan	27	0	—		—		—		27	0
St. Pauli (loan)	2020–21	2. Bundesliga	5	0	—		—		—		5	0
St. Pauli	2021–22	2. Bundesliga	17	0	2	0	—		—		19	0
St. Pauli	2022–23	2. Bundesliga	26	2	2	1	—		—		28	3
St. Pauli	2023–24	2. Bundesliga	26	1	4	1	—		—		30	2
St. Pauli	2024–25	Bundesliga	32	1	2	0	—		—		34	1
St. Pauli	2025–26	Bundesliga	27	2	2	0	—		—		29	2
St. Pauli	2026–27	2. Bundesliga	8	0	1	0	—		—		9	0
St. Pauli	Total		136	6	13	2	—		—		149	8
Career total			260	7	30	2	6	0	—		296	9

=== International ===
As of match played 17 November 2026

Appearances and goals by national team and year
National team	Year	Apps	Goals
Sweden	2026	5	0
Total		5	0

== Honours ==
FC St. Pauli

- 2. Bundesliga : 2023–24
