= Hauke Wahl =

German footballer (born 1994)

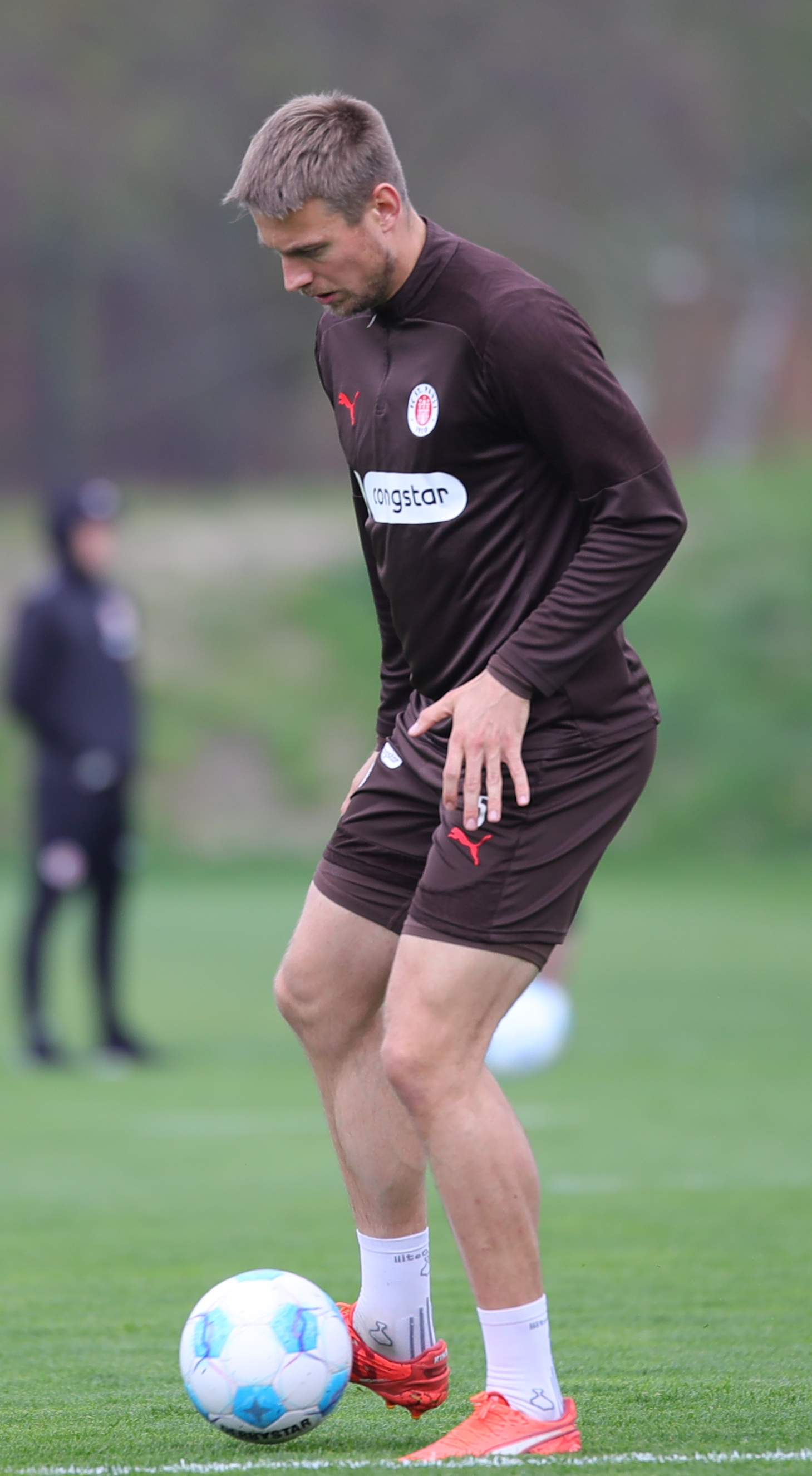
- Hauke Wahl (2025)

Personal information
- Full name: Hauke Finn Wahl
- Date of birth: 15 April 1994 (age 32)
- Place of birth: Hamburg, Germany
- Height: 1.89 m (6 ft 2 in)
- Position: Centre-back

Team information
- Current team: VfL Wolfsburg
- Number: 6

Youth career
- Witzhaver SV
- TSV Trittau
- –2010: Eintracht Schwerin
- 2010–2012: Dynamo Dresden
- 2012–2013: Holstein Kiel

Senior career*
Years	Team	Apps	(Gls)
2013–2015	Holstein Kiel	62	(2)
2015–2016	SC Paderborn	29	(2)
2016–2018	FC Ingolstadt	27	(3)
2016	FC Ingolstadt 04 II	1	(0)
2017	→ 1. FC Heidenheim (loan)	14	(0)
2018–2023	Holstein Kiel	148	(5)
2022	Holstein Kiel II	1	(0)
2023–2026	FC St. Pauli	96	(2)
2026–	VfL Wolfsburg	6	(1)
- * Club domestic league appearances and goals as of 20:30, 18 September 2026 (UTC)

Hauke Wahl (born 15 April 1994) is a German professional footballer who plays as a centre-back for 2. Bundesliga club VfL Wolfsburg.

== Career ==
Wahl joined Holstein Kiel from Dynamo Dresden in 2012. After playing for the club's U19 team he made the first team in 2013.

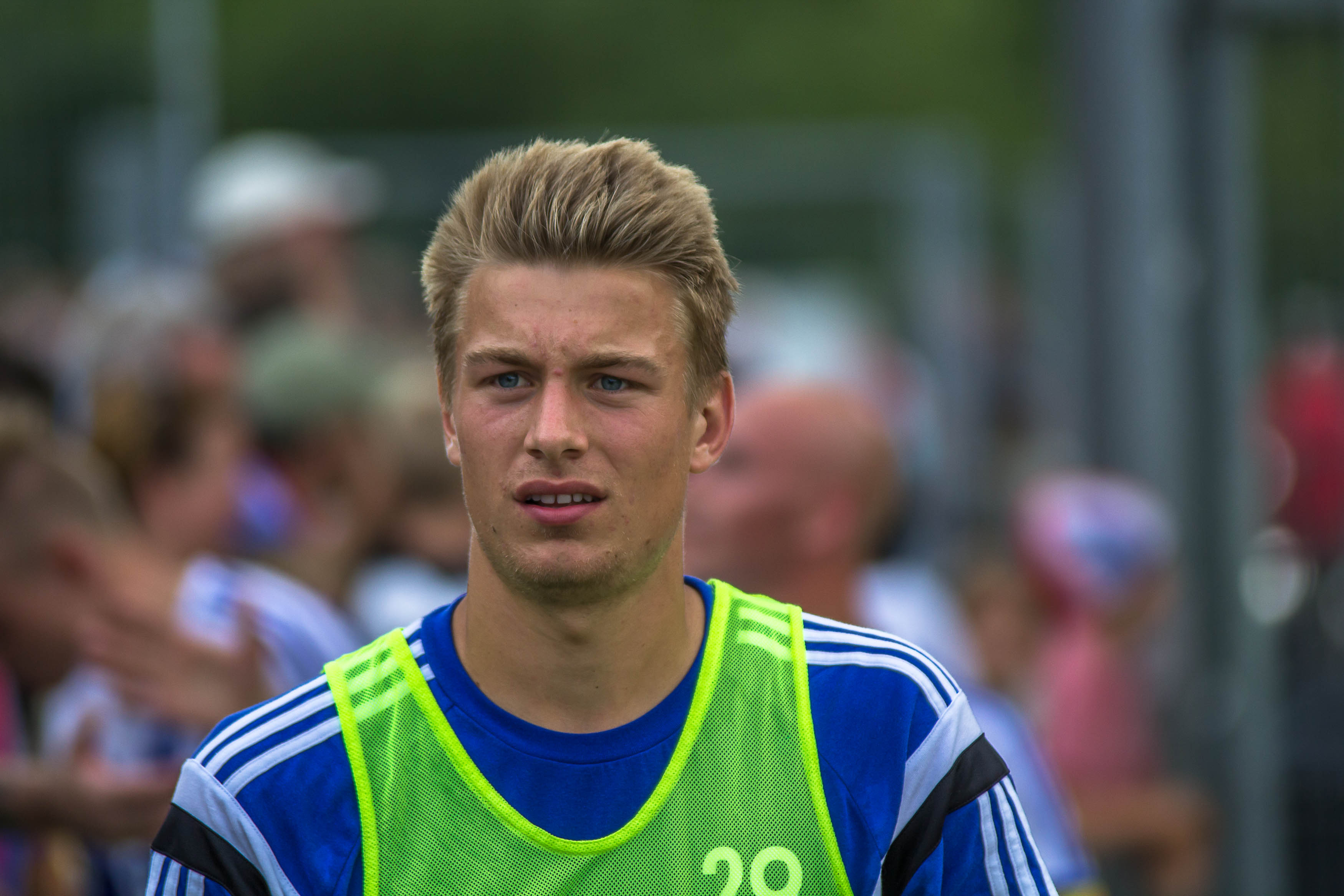
Hauke Wahl with Holstein Kiel

In August 2016, Wahl left Holstein Kiel for SC Paderborn, freshly relegated from the Bundesliga. He signed a three-year contract.

In June 2016, he signed a three-year deal with Ingolstadt, joining on a free transfer from Paderborn. In December 2016, it was announced he would move to 1. FC Heidenheim on loan until the end of the 2016–17 season.

In July 2018, Wahl returned to his former club Holstein Kiel having agreed a three-year contract until 2021. A year later, he agreed a contract extension until 2023 with the club.

On 22 June 2026, Wahl signed a three-year contract with VfL Wolfsburg.

== Career statistics ==
As of match played 20 September 2026

Appearances and goals by club, season and competition
Club	Season	League			Cup		Continental		Other		Total	
Club	Season	Division	Apps	Goals	Apps	Goals	Apps	Goals	Apps	Goals	Apps	Goals
Holstein Kiel	2013–14	3. Liga	26	0	0	0	—		—		26	0
Holstein Kiel	2014–15	3. Liga	33	2	1	0	—		—		34	2
Holstein Kiel	2015–16	3. Liga	3	0	1	0	—		—		4	0
Holstein Kiel	Total		62	2	2	0	—		—		64	2
SC Paderborn	2015–16	2. Bundesliga	29	2	0	0	—		—		29	2
FC Ingolstadt	2016–17	Bundesliga	0	0	1	0	—		—		1	0
FC Ingolstadt	2017–18	2. Bundesliga	27	3	3	0	—		—		30	3
FC Ingolstadt	Total		27	3	4	0	—		—		31	3
FC Ingolstadt 04 II	2016–17	Regionalliga Bayern	1	0	—		—		—		1	0
1. FC Heidenheim (loan)	2016–17	2. Bundesliga	14	0	1	0	—		—		15	0
Holstein Kiel	2018–19	2. Bundesliga	33	2	3	0	—		—		36	2
Holstein Kiel	2019–20	2. Bundesliga	34	1	2	0	—		—		36	1
Holstein Kiel	2020–21	2. Bundesliga	34	0	5	2	—		2	0	41	2
Holstein Kiel	2021–22	2. Bundesliga	18	0	2	0	—		—		20	0
Holstein Kiel	2022–23	2. Bundesliga	29	2	0	0	—		—		29	2
Holstein Kiel	Total		148	5	12	2	—		2	0	162	7
FC St. Pauli	2023–24	2. Bundesliga	33	0	4	1	—		—		37	1
FC St. Pauli	2024–25	Bundesliga	33	0	2	0	—		—		35	0
FC St. Pauli	2025–26	Bundesliga	30	2	2	1	—		—		32	3
FC St. Pauli	Total		96	2	8	2	—		—		104	4
VfL Wolfsburg	2026–27	2. Bundesliga	6	1	1	1	—		—		7	2
Career total			393	15	28	5	0	0	2	0	424	20

== Honours ==
FC St. Pauli

- 2.Bundesliga : 2023–24
