= Sölden, Baden-Württemberg =

Sölden
- Municipality
- Coat of arms

- Location of Sölden within Breisgau-Hochschwarzwald district
- Interactive map of Sölden
- Location within Germany Location within Baden-Württemberg
- Coordinates: 47°55′56″N 7°48′42″E
- Country: Germany
- State: Baden-Württemberg
- Admin. region: Freiburg
- District: Breisgau-Hochschwarzwald
- Subdivisions: 2

Government
  - Mayor (2017–25): Markus Rees

Area
  - Total: 3.80 km^{2} (1.47 sq mi)
- Elevation: 394 m (1,293 ft)

Population (2025-12-31)
  - Total: 1,282
  - Density: 337/km^{2} (874/sq mi)
- Time zone: UTC+01:00 (CET)
  - Summer (DST): UTC+02:00 (CEST)
- Postal codes: 79294
- Dialling codes: 0761
- Vehicle registration: FR
- Website: www.soelden.de

Sölden (German pronunciation: [ˈzœldn̩]; Alemannic German: Sailede) is a town in the Breisgau-Hochschwarzwald district in Baden-Württemberg in southern Germany.
