= FC Eintracht Norderstedt 03 =

German football club

- Full name: FC Eintracht Norderstedt von 2003 e.V.
- Founded: 2003
- Ground: Edmund-Plambeck-Stadion
- Capacity: 5,068
- Chairman: Reenald Koch
- Trainer: Özden Kocadal
- League: Regionalliga Nord (IV)
- 2025–26: Regionalliga Nord, 15th of 18

FC Eintracht Norderstedt 03 (German pronunciation: [ˈaɪntʁaxt ˈnɔʁdɐʃtɛt]) is a German football club based in Norderstedt, Schleswig-Holstein, currently playing in the Regionalliga Nord (IV).

== History ==
The team was founded in 1945 as SV Eintracht Garstedt, which joined 1. SC Norderstedt in 1972. 1. SC was established just two years earlier on 7 January 1970 as Tanzportverein Norderstedt. The football department split from the club in 2003 to create FC Eintracht Norderstedt 03.

Playing as 1. SC, the footballers were part of the Amateuroberliga Nord (III) for seven seasons from 1987 to 1994. They finished second there in 1993 and took part in the promotion round for the 2. Bundesliga where they performed poorly. The following season they crashed out of Amateuroberliga play after a 15th-place result. The team rebounded, earning a second-place result in the Oberliga Hamburg/Schleswig-Holstein (IV), and the following year joined the new Regionalliga Nord (III). 1. SC faced relegation after ending the 1997–98 season in 16th, but escaped demotion due to the withdrawal of VfL Hamburg 93. They played two more seasons as a mid-table side in the Regionalliga, before again becoming part of the Oberliga Hamburg/Schleswig-Holstein (IV) following league reorganization. Despite a strong 3rd-place finish in 2002, they withdrew from the Oberliga the next year.

The team has made two appearances in play for the DFB-Pokal (German Cup), going out in the opening rounds in 1996 and 2000.

Following their departure from the club in 2003, the footballers – now playing as FC Eintracht – restarted in the Kreisliga (VIII) competition and climbed back to fifth tier competition after three consecutive promotions. In 2013, the club was given a Regionalliga license and was promoted to the Regionalliga Nord.

== Stadium ==
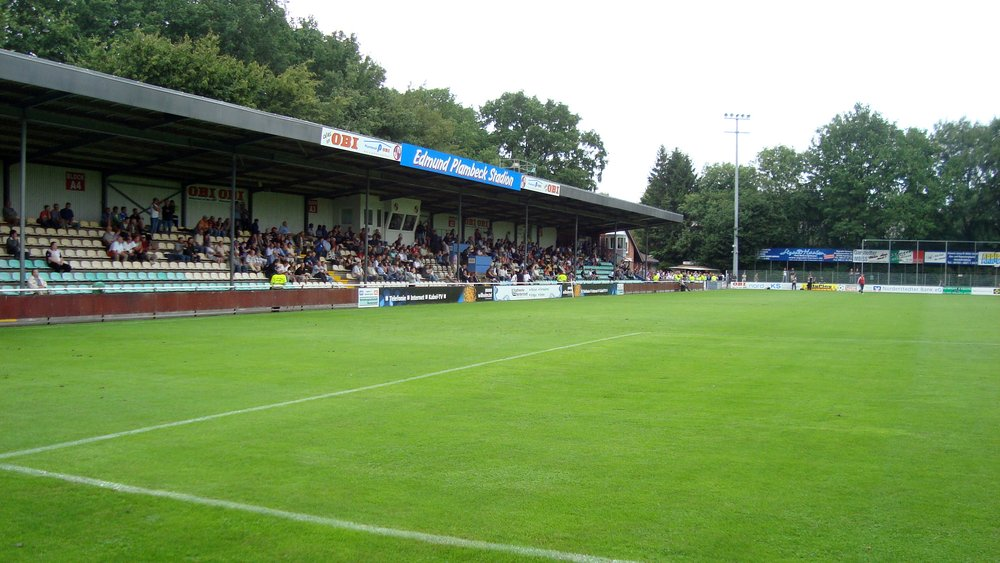
Edmund-Plambeck-Stadion

FC Eintracht Norderstedt 03 plays its home fixtures at the 5,068 capacity Edmund-Plambeck-Stadion. The stadium was used by the Czech Republic national football team as their training ground during Euro 2024.

== Current squad ==
As of 8 September 2026

Note: Flags indicate national team as defined under FIFA eligibility rules; some limited exceptions apply. Players may hold more than one non-FIFA nationality.

No.	Pos.	Nation	Player
1	GK	GER	Lars Huxsohl
2	DF	GER	Henrik Lauterbach
3	DF	GER	Endrik Jaschan
4	DF	GER	Fabian Grau
5	DF	GER	Moritz Frahm
6	MF	GER	Falk Gross
7	FW	GER	Nick Gutmann
8	DF	GER	Dane Kummerfeld
9	FW	GER	Lukas Krüger
10	MF	GER	Jonas Behounek
11	MF	GER	Melvin Zimmer
12	GK	GER	Paul Ralfs
14	FW	GER	Lenny Kufrin
15	MF	GER	Josh Görtzen
16	DF	GER	Julius Grunwald

No.	Pos.	Nation	Player
17	FW	GER	Lucas Camacho
18	DF	CRO	Leon Pesch
19	MF	GER	Manuel Brendel
20	MF	GER	Bjarne Kasper
21	FW	GER	Ediz Eroglu
22	DF	GER	Leo Bera
23	MF	ARM	Erjanik Ghubasaryan
25	MF	GER	Josh Görtzen
26	DF	GER	Manasse Fionouke
27	DF	FRA	Jesse Osei
29	MF	GER	Ezra Ampofo
30	MF	GER	Milad Nejad
32	MF	GER	Luca Palzer
33	GK	GER	Malte Brüning

== Honours ==
- Landesliga Hamburg-Hansa
  - Champions: 1977, 2006
- Hamburg Cup
  - Winners: 1995, 1999, 2016, 2017, 2020, 2021, 2025
