= Jonas Behounek =

German footballer

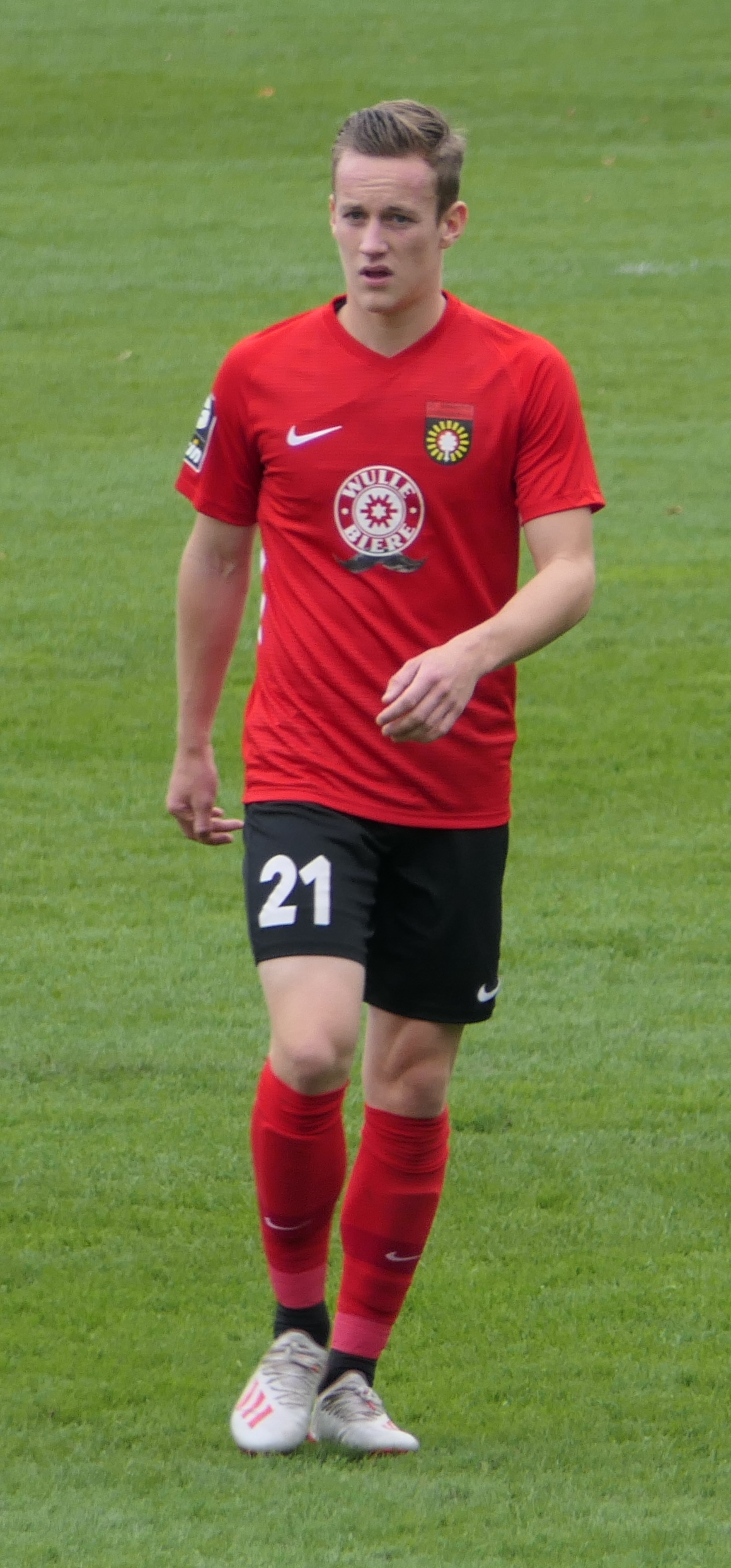
- Behounek with Sonnenhof Großaspach in 2019

Personal information
- Date of birth: 17 May 1998 (age 28)
- Place of birth: Kaltenkirchen, Germany
- Height: 1.80 m (5 ft 11 in)
- Position: Defender

Team information
- Current team: Eintracht Norderstedt
- Number: 10

Youth career
- –2011: Kaltenkirchener TS
- 2011–2012: Eintracht Norderstedt
- 2012–2017: Hamburger SV

Senior career*
Years	Team	Apps	(Gls)
2017–2019	Hamburger SV II	55	(8)
2019–2020	Sonnenhof Großaspach	28	(2)
2020–2021	Rot-Weiss Essen	5	(0)
2021–2024	Eintracht Norderstedt	72	(6)
2025–	Eintracht Norderstedt	49	(13)

International career^{‡}
2013	Germany U15	2	(0)
2013	Germany U16	6	(0)
2017	Germany U20	1	(0)
- * Club domestic league appearances and goals as of 22 September 2026 ‡ National team caps and goals as of 16:43, 1 August 2019 (UTC)

Jonas Behounek (born 17 May 1998) is a German professional footballer who plays as a defender for Eintracht Norderstedt.

== Career ==
Behounek began playing club football as a child with Kaltenkirchener TS. In 2011 he moved to Eintracht Norderstedt where he remained until 2012 when he joined Bundesliga club Hamburger SV. At Hamburger SV, he spent two seasons playing for the club's reserves in the Regionalliga.

Behounek made his professional debut for Sonnenhof Großaspach in the 3. Liga on 20 July 2019, starting in the away match against MSV Duisburg, which finished as a 1–4 loss.

== Personal life ==
Behounek was born in Kaltenkirchen, Schleswig-Holstein and is of Czech descent.
