= 2001–02 FC St. Pauli season =

FC St. Pauli
2001–02 season
- Manager: Dietmar Demuth
- Stadium: Millerntor-Stadion
- Bundesliga: 18th
- DFB-Pokal: First round
Home colours	Away colours	Third colours

The 2001–02 season for FC St. Pauli was the 91st season in the football club's history. They were promoted from the 2. Bundesliga to the Bundesliga, the highest division of German football. It was their fourth stint in the league.

St Pauli was relegated from the Bundesliga after one season.

== First-team squad ==
Note: Flags indicate national team as defined under FIFA eligibility rules; some limited exceptions apply. Players may hold more than one non-FIFA nationality.

No.	Pos.	Nation	Player
1	GK	(Croatia) CRO	Tihomir Bulat
2	DF	(Germany) GER	André Trulsen
3	DF	(Germany) GER	Christian Rahn
4	DF	(Benin) BEN	Moudachirou Amadou
5	DF	(Croatia) CRO	Zlatko Basic
6	MF	(Germany) GER	Markus Lotter
7	FW	(Argentina) ARG	Matías Cenci
8	MF	(Germany) GER	Henning Bürger
9	FW	(Germany) GER	Marcel Rath
10	MF	(Germany) GER	Thomas Meggle
11	MF	(Romania) ROU	Cătălin Răcănel
12	DF	(Nigeria) NGA	Yakubu Adamu
14	MF	(Turkey) TUR	Uğur İnceman (Note: İnceman was born in Aachen, Germany, but also qualified to represent Turkey internationally and represented them at U-19 and U-21 level before making his international debut for Turkey in February 2004.)
15	MF	(Bosnia and Herzegovina) BIH	Zlatan Bajramovic (Note: Bajramović was born in Hamburg, Germany, but also qualified to represent Bosnia and Herzegovina internationally through his parents and made his international debut for Bosnia and Herzegovina in 2002.)
16	MF	(Germany) GER	Oliver Held

No.	Pos.	Nation	Player
17	DF	(Germany) GER	Jochen Kientz
18	MF	(Iran) IRN	Alireza Mansourian
19	DF	(United States) USA	Cory Gibbs
20	GK	(Germany) GER	Simon Henzler
21	DF	(Germany) GER	Holger Stanislawski
22	DF	(Germany) GER	Daniel Scheinhardt
23	GK	(Germany) GER	Torsten Miethe
24	FW	(Germany) GER	Toralf Konetzke
25	FW	(Brazil) BRA	Marcão
26	MF	(Turkey) TUR	Deniz Barış
27	FW	(Germany) GER	Nico Patschinski
28	DF	(Germany) GER	Dubravko Kolinger
29	DF	(Germany) GER	Jens Matthies
30	DF	(Germany) GER	Hauke Brückner

=== Left club during season ===
Note: Flags indicate national team as defined under FIFA eligibility rules; some limited exceptions apply. Players may hold more than one non-FIFA nationality.

No. / Pos. / Nation / Player; 13 / MF / (Norway) NOR / Morten Berre (to Viking)	No. / Pos. / Nation / Player; 33 / MF / (Ukraine) UKR / Dema Kovalenko (Note: Kovalenko was born in Kiev, Ukraine SSR (now Kyiv, Ukraine), but was raised in the United States from the age of 14.) (on loan from Chicago Fire)

== Competitions ==
Legend

Win Draw Loss

Competition	First match	Last match	Starting round	Final position	Record							
Competition	First match	Last match	Starting round	Final position	Pld	W	D	L	GF	GA	GD	Win %
Bundesliga	29 July 2001	4 May 2002	Matchday 1	18th	34	4	10	20	37	70	−33	11.76
DFB-Pokal	24 August 2001	24 August 2001	First round	First round	1	0	0	1	1	3	−2	0.00
Total					35	4	10	21	38	73	−35	11.43

Source: Kicker (league), Kicker (cup)

=== Bundesliga ===
==== League table ====
Pos	Team	Pld	W	D	L	GF	GA	GD	Pts	Qualification or relegation
14	Hansa Rostock	34	9	7	18	35	54	−19	34	
15	1. FC Nürnberg	34	10	4	20	34	57	−23	34	
16	SC Freiburg (R)	34	7	9	18	37	64	−27	30	Relegation to 2. Bundesliga
17	1. FC Köln (R)	34	7	8	19	26	61	−35	29	Relegation to 2. Bundesliga
18	FC St. Pauli (R)	34	4	10	20	37	70	−33	22	Relegation to 2. Bundesliga

Source: bundesliga.de
Rules for classification: 1) points; 2) goal difference; 3) number of goals scored.
(R) Relegated

==== Results summary ====
Overall								Home						Away					
Pld	W	D	L	GF	GA	GD	Pts	W	D	L	GF	GA	GD	W	D	L	GF	GA	GD
34	4	10	20	37	70	−33	22	4	4	9	19	28	−9	0	6	11	18	42	−24

Source: Kicker

==== Results by round ====
Round	1	2	3	4	5	6	7	8	9	10	11	12	13	14	15	16	17	18	19	20	21	22	23	24	25	26	27	28	29	30	31	32	33	34
Ground	H	A	H	A	H	A	A	H	A	H	A	H	A	H	A	H	A	A	H	A	H	A	H	H	A	H	A	H	A	H	A	H	A	H
Result	D	D	L	L	L	L	D	L	D	W	L	L	L	L	L	L	D	D	W	L	W	L	D	D	D	W	L	L	L	D	L	L	L	L
Position	7	12	14	17	18	18	17	18	18	17	17	17	18	18	18	18	18	18	18	18	17	17	17	17	17	17	17	17	17	17	18	18	18	18

Source: Kicker
A = Away; H = Home; W = Win; D = Draw; L = Loss
