= Politisches derby =

Football rivalry in Germany

- FC Hansa Rostock FC St. Pauli
- Other names: Political derby Fear derby
- Location: Northern Germany
- First meeting: St. Pauli 0–2 Hansa Rostock (12 August 1992); 1992–93 2. Bundesliga
- Latest meeting: St. Pauli 1–0 Hansa Rostock (26 April 2024); 2023–24 2. Bundesliga
- Stadiums: Ostseestadion (Hansa Rostock); Millerntor-Stadion (St. Pauli)

Statistics
- Total meetings: 24
- Most wins: St. Pauli (13)
- All-time record: Hansa Rostock: 13; St. Pauli: 13

The Politisches derby (lit. Political derby) is an association football rivalry between German clubs FC Hansa Rostock and FC St. Pauli. The derby was first contested on 12 August 1992. Hansa Rostock play at the Ostseestadion in Rostock, Mecklenburg-Vorpommern, while St. Pauli play at the Millerntor-Stadion in St. Pauli, Hamburg. The teams have played 24 matches, with each side winning 12.

== History ==
The origin of the name Politisches derby is due to leftist alignment of St. Pauli and rightist alignment of Hansa Rostock. In 1980s, St. Pauli transitioned from standard traditional club into Kult club, officially banning right-wing nationalist activities and displays in its stadium during a period of fascist-inspired football hooliganism across Europe, while Hansa Rostock leans towards far-right ideology and Neo-Nazism.

The first derby was played on 12 August 1992, Hansa Rostock won 2–0 away at St. Pauli. Both clubs have contested majority of the derby in 2. Bundesliga. The first top-flight derby was contested on 23 September 1995 during 1995–96 Bundesliga season.

Economics also played a part in the rivalry. Rostock was the primary port of East Germany, which had a socialist planned economy, and the government and football authorities privileged the city and the club. Upon German reunification, Rostock was now one of many ports, with several in the west – including Hamburg, the home of St Pauli – having better facilities. Unemployment led to violent xenophobia in August 1992, and the unrest was still ongoing when St Pauli arrived for their first match against Hansa.

== Supporters ==
=== Fans and violence ===
The violent clashes between both sets of fans are a common occurrence due to their political ideologies as Hansa Rostock promotes Neo-Nazism, while St. Pauli fans are anti-fascist, making it one the football match with high police security. During a clash between the clubs, Hansa Rostock fans wore black hoods with number 88 on it. After a late St. Pauli goal, Hansa Rostock fans peppered celebrating St. Pauli at away end with fireworks and flares, while bananas were thrown at St. Pauli's black goalkeeper. During a match away to Rostock, St. Pauli unveiled a 20 meter long banner at away end with a message, "St. Pauli Antifa – Red or Dead" and were barraged with missiles. After a match in 2011, Rostock coach Peter Vollmann said, "You could hand out a €10 million fine, it changes nothing. It is hopeless." After Hansa's fascist chants. During the match bananas were thrown at St. Pauli goalkeeper, Philipp Tschauner and a Rostock fan hung up a St. Pauli shirt doused in petrol and set it alight.

During 2009–10 season, St. Pauli supported fans of Hansa Rostock after St. Pauli reduced away fans seats from 1,900 to 500, also displaying a banner saying, "Today Rostock, Tomorrow Us?".

== Matches ==
=== All-time results ===
#	Season	Date	Competition	Stadium	Home Team	Result	Away Team	Attendance	H2H
1	1992–93	12 August 1992	2. Bundesliga	Millerntor-Stadion	St. Pauli	0–2	Hansa Rostock	18,631	+1
2	1992–93	13 March 1993	2. Bundesliga	Ostseestadion	Hansa Rostock	2–0	St. Pauli	8,000	+2
3	1993–94	15 August 1993	2. Bundesliga	Millerntor-Stadion	St. Pauli	2–4	Hansa Rostock	20,247	+3
4	1993–94	18 April 1994	2. Bundesliga	Ostseestadion	Hansa Rostock	0–1	St. Pauli	10,500	+2
5	1994–95	23 August 1994	2. Bundesliga	Ostseestadion	Hansa Rostock	3–0	St. Pauli	9,200	+1
6	1994–95	24 February 1995	2. Bundesliga	Millerntor-Stadion	St. Pauli	2–0	Hansa Rostock	20,725	0
7	1995–96	23 September 1995	Bundesliga	Ostseestadion	Hansa Rostock	2–0	St. Pauli	25,800	+1
8	1995–96	24 March 1996	Bundesliga	Millerntor-Stadion	St. Pauli	3–2	Hansa Rostock	16,500	0
9	1996–97	25 October 1996	Bundesliga	Ostseestadion	Hansa Rostock	3–1	St. Pauli	20,500	+1
10	1996–97	24 April 1997	Bundesliga	Millerntor-Stadion	St. Pauli	0–1	Hansa Rostock	17,212	+2
11	2001–02	12 August 2001	Bundesliga	Millerntor-Stadion	St. Pauli	0–1	Hansa Rostock	19,600	+3
12	2001–02	24 April 1997	Bundesliga	Ostseestadion	Hansa Rostock	1–0	St. Pauli	18,600	+4
13	2008–09	26 September 2008	2. Bundesliga	DKB-Arena	Hansa Rostock	3–0	St. Pauli	23,000	+5
14	2008–09	6 March 2009	2. Bundesliga	Millerntor-Stadion	St. Pauli	3–2	Hansa Rostock	22,138	+4
15	2009–10	2 November 2009	2. Bundesliga	DKB-Arena	Hansa Rostock	0–2	St. Pauli	21,500	+3
16	2009–10	28 March 2010	2. Bundesliga	Millerntor-Stadion	St. Pauli	2–0	Hansa Rostock	19,146	+2
17	2011–12	19 November 2011	2. Bundesliga	DKB-Arena	Hansa Rostock	1–3	St. Pauli	24,200	+1
18	2011–12	22 April 2012	2. Bundesliga	Millerntor-Stadion	St. Pauli	3–0	Hansa Rostock	22,620	0
19	2021–22	24 October 2021	2. Bundesliga	Millerntor-Stadion	St. Pauli	4–0	Hansa Rostock	22,006	+1
20	2021–22	2 April 2022	2. Bundesliga	DKB-Arena	Hansa Rostock	1–0	St. Pauli	25,000	0
21	2022–23	21 August 2022	2. Bundesliga	DKB-Arena	Hansa Rostock	2–0	St. Pauli	26,000	+1
22	2022–23	26 February 2023	2. Bundesliga	Millerntor-Stadion	St. Pauli	1–0	Hansa Rostock	29,205	0
23	2023–24	25 November 2023	2. Bundesliga	Ostseestadion	Hansa Rostock	2–3	St. Pauli	27,100	+1
24	2023–24	26 April 2024	2. Bundesliga	Millerntor-Stadion	St. Pauli	1–0	Hansa Rostock		+2

=== Statistics ===
As of 26 April 2024

Competition	Played	Hansa wins	Draws	St. Pauli wins	Hansa goals	St. Pauli goals
Bundesliga	6	5	0	1	10	4
2. Bundesliga	18	6	0	12	22	27
Total	24	11	0	13	32	31

== Statistics ==
=== All-time top goalscorers ===
Nation	Player	Club(s)	League	Years
(East Germany)	Timo Lange	Hansa Rostock	4	1992–2003
(Germany)	Stefan Beinlich	Hansa Rostock	3	1994–1997; 2006–2008
(Germany)	Marius Ebbers	St. Pauli	3	2008–2013

=== All-time most appearances ===
Nation	Player	Club	Appearances	Years	Position
(East Germany)	Heiko März	Hansa Rostock	9	1983–1998	Defender
(East Germany)	Marco Zallmann	Hansa Rostock	9	1992–2001	Defender
(East Germany)	Timo Lange	Hansa Rostock	9	1992–2003	Midfielder
(West Germany)	Dirk Dammann	St. Pauli	8	1990–1999	Defender
(East Germany)	Hilmar Weilandt	Hansa Rostock	8	1986–2002	Midfielder
(West Germany)	Holger Stanislawski	St. Pauli	8	2006–2007; 2008–2011	Defender
(West Germany)	Martin Driller	St. Pauli	8	1991–1997	Forward
(Poland)	Sławomir Chałaśkiewicz	Hansa Rostock	8	1992–1997	Midfielder

=== Discipline ===
Red cards

Nation	Player	Club	Red card(s)	Years	Position
(East Germany)	Heiko März	Hansa Rostock	2	1983–1998	Defender
(West Germany)	Fabian Boll	St. Pauli	1	2002–2014	Midfielder
(East Germany)	Marco Zallmann	Hansa Rostock	1	1992–2001	Defender
(Denmark)	Martin Retov	Hansa Rostock	1	2008–2010	Midfielder
(France)	Morike Sako	St. Pauli	1	2007–2010	Forward
(Germany)	Tom Weilandt	Hansa Rostock	1	2011–2013	Midfielder

=== Played for both clubs ===
Player	St. Pauli career			Hansa Rostock career		
Player	Span	League apps	League goals	Span	League apps	League goals
(Germany) Bentley Baxter Bahn	2014	3	0	2020–2021	67	8
(Germany) Maurice Litka	2014–2017	22	0	2020	17	2
(Germany) Tom Trybull	2013–2014	16	0	2010	18	0
(Netherlands) John Verhoek	2013–2015	73	11	2019–2022	122	36
(Germany) Kevin Schindler	2011–2013	48	3	2008	32	5
(Germany) Fin Bartels	2010–2013	117	22	2007–2009	77	14
(Germany) Bastian Oczipka	2009–2010	36	1	2008–2009	42	0
(Germany) Jochen Kientz	2001	21	1	2002–2003	23	1
(Germany) Thomas Meggle	2001–2002; 2007–2009	31; 24	10; 3	2002–2005	44	18
(Germany) Christian Rahn	1996–2001	33	3	2006–2008	66	9
