= Hauke Brückner =

German footballer

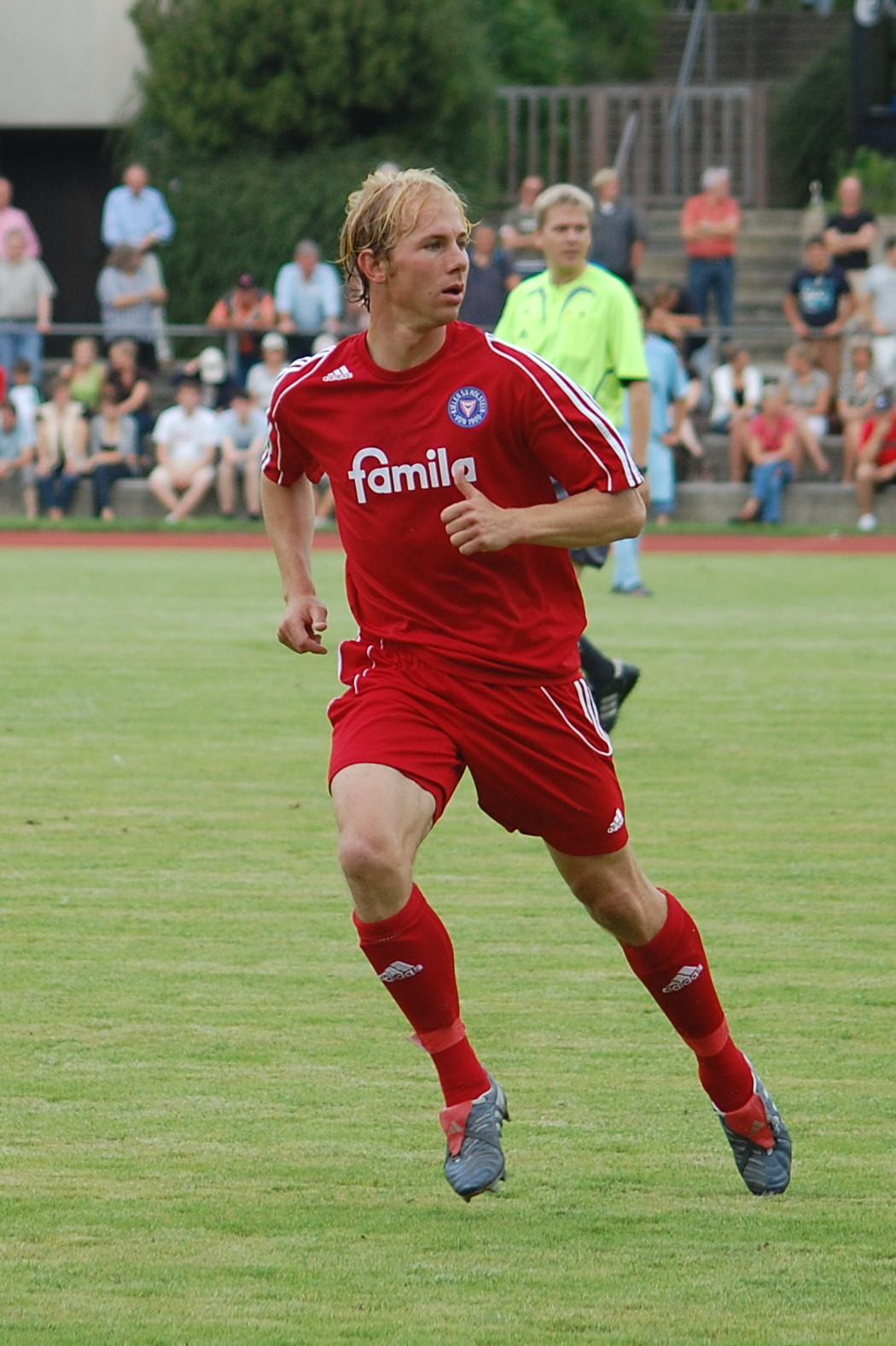
Brückner with Holstein Kiel

Hauke Brückner (born 29 February 1980) is a German former professional footballer who played as a defender or defensive midfielder.

== Career ==
Brückner started his career with German third tier side FC St. Pauli, helping them earn promotion to the German second tier and reach the 2005–06 DFB-Pokal semifinals. In 2007, he signed for Holstein Kiel in the German fourth tier, helping them earn promotion to the German third tier.

In 2010, Brückner returned to former club FC St. Pauli, playing in the Bundesliga, to play for the club's reserves. He was called up to the first team by coach Holger Stanislawski in February 2011 because four full-backs were missing through injury or suspension. In 2014, he signed for USC Paloma in the German fifth tier, where he suffered relegation to the German sixth tier.
