= Acolatse =

Acolatse is a surname. Notable people with the surname include:

- Charles Acolatse (born 1995), French-born Togolese footballer
- Elton Acolatse (born 1995), Dutch footballer
- Guy Acolatse (born 1942), Togolese footballer
- Sena Acolatse (born 1990), American-Canadian ice hockey player
