= Amiro Amadou =

Beninese footballer

Personal information
- Full name: Amiro Amadou
- Date of birth: 10 July 2002 (age 24)
- Place of birth: Hamburg, Germany
- Height: 1.94 m (6 ft 4 in)
- Position: Centre-back

Team information
- Current team: Babelsberg
- Number: 16

Youth career
- 2006–2008: TuS Holstein Quickborn
- 2008–2009: SV Bonlanden
- 2009–2012: TSV Bernhausen
- 2012–2015: SV Vaihingen
- 2015–2017: VfB Stuttgart
- 2018–2019: Erzgebirge Aue
- 2019–2020: VfR Aalen
- 2020: Kickers Offenbach
- 2021: SSV Ulm 1846

Senior career*
Years	Team	Apps	(Gls)
2021–2022	Oberneuland	24	(1)
2022–2023	Germania Halberstadt	7	(0)
2023–2024	Jahn Regensburg II	42	(5)
2024–2026	BFC Dynamo	38	(1)
2026–	Babelsberg	4	(0)

International career^{‡}
2026–	Benin	2	(1)
- * Club domestic league appearances and goals as of 23 September 2026 ‡ National team caps and goals as of 9 October 2026

Amiro Amadou (born 10 July 2002 in Hamburg) is a footballer who plays as a centre-back for Babelsberg in the Regionalliga Nordost. Born in Germany, he plays for the Benin national team.

== Club career ==
Amadou developed through football in Germany and began his senior career at Oberneuland in the Regionalliga Nord in 2021–22. He subsequently moved to Germania Halberstadt in July 2022 before joining the reserve side of SSV Jahn Regensburg, where he made four appearances in the Oberliga Bayern Nord in 2023–24.

In July 2024, Amadou signed for BFC Dynamo ahead of the new Regionalliga Nordost season. The deal was finalised just two days before the club's opening fixture against Carl Zeiss Jena, having trained with the squad during pre-season and featured in test matches against 1. FC Magdeburg and Sampdoria. He went on to make 25 appearances in his debut season as BFC Dynamo finished runners-up in the Regionalliga Nordost.

== International career ==
Amadou was born in Germany to a Beninese father and German mother, and holds dual citizenship. He represented Benin at under-23 level before earning his first senior call-up under coach Gernot Rohr for the June 2026 FIFA window. He made his senior debut and scored on 5 June 2026, netting Benin's opening goal in a 1–1 friendly draw against Niger.

== Personal life ==
Amiro is the son of Moudachirou Amadou, a former Beninese international defender who played in the Bundesliga with FC St. Pauli.

== Honours ==
BFC Dynamo

- Verbandspokal: 2024–25
