= Josef Eichkorn =

German football coach (born 1956)

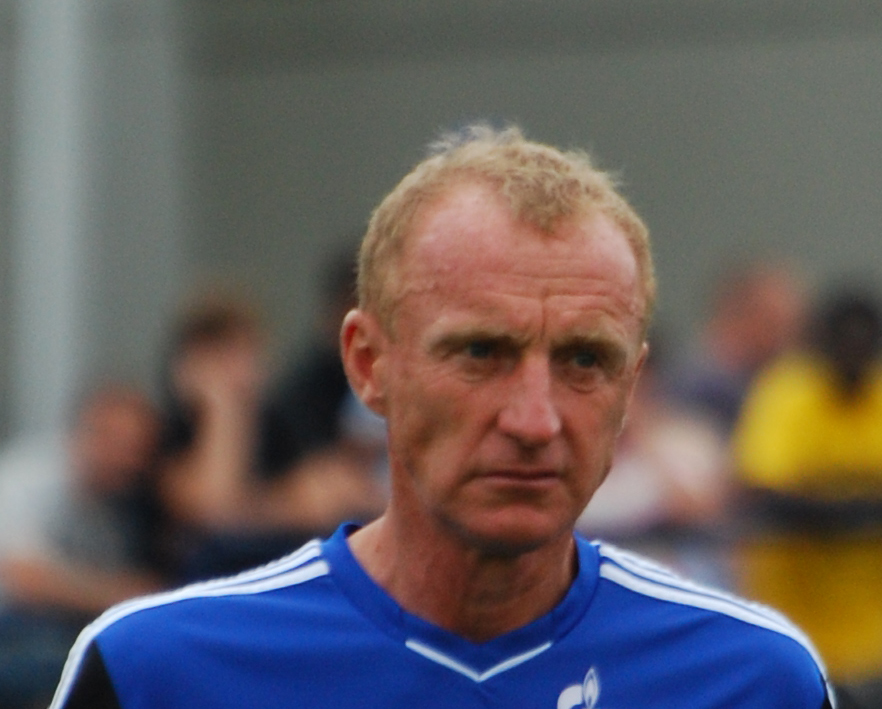
- Eichkorn in 2011

Personal information
- Date of birth: 16 September 1956 (age 70)
- Place of birth: Radolfzell, West Germany

Senior career*
Years	Team	Apps	(Gls)
- FV Gallmannsweil
- Borussia Köln-Kalk
- Efferen
- SV Hürth

Managerial career
- 1983–1985: SV Hürth (player-manager)
- 1987–1992: FC St. Pauli (assistant)
- 1992: FC St. Pauli
- 1992: FC St. Pauli (assistant)
- 1992–1994: FC St. Pauli
- 1994–2000: MSV Duisburg (assistant)
- 2000: MSV Duisburg
- 2000: MSV Duisburg (assistant)
- 2000–2001: MSV Duisburg
- 2001–2004: VfB Stuttgart (assistant)
- 2004–2007: Bayern Munich (assistant)
- 2007–2009: VfL Wolfsburg (assistant)
- 2009–2013: Schalke 04 (assistant)
- * Club domestic league appearances and goals

Josef "Seppo" Eichkorn (born 16 September 1956) is a German former football coach and player.

== Coaching career ==
Eichkorn was born in Radolfzell, Baden-Württemberg. He was manager of FC St. Pauli from 1 April 1992 to 30 June 1992 Eichkorn managed St. Pauli for six matches before Michael Lorkowski took over on 1 July 1992. His first match was a 1–1 draw against KFC Uerdingen 05 on 3 April 1992. Eichkorn finished with a record of three wins, two draws, and one loss. Eichkorn again was manager from 25 September 1992 to 30 June 1994. His first match as manager was a 4–1 win against FC Remscheid. St. Pauli finished the 1992–93 season in 17th place, one spot above the relegation. During the 1993–94 season, St. Pauli got to the third round of the German Cup. Eichkorn finished with a record of 25 wins, 26 draws, and 19 losses and a combined record of 28 wins, 28 draws, and 20 losses.

Eichkorn was manager of MSV Duisburg from 24 March 2000 to 30 June 2000. This stint was on an interim basis. His first match was a 3–2 loss to VfL Wolfsburg on 25 March 2000. He finished with a record of one win, two draws, and six losses in nine matches. Eichkorn again managed Duisburg from 16 October 2000 to 30 June 2001. His first match was a 4–3 win against SSV Reutlingen 05 on 22 October 2000. He finished with a record of 11 wins, nine draws, nd nine losses in 29 matches and a combined record of 12 wins, 11 draws, and 15 losses.

Eichkorn was manager of FC Schalke 04 from 16 March 2011 to 20 March 2011. His only match was a 2–0 loss to Bayer Leverkusen on 2 March 2011. During the 2011–12 season, Eichkorn was again manager from 22 September 2011 to 26 September 2011. His only match during this period was a 4–2 win against SC Freiburg. He was also manager on 14 December 2011 against Maccabi Haifa in the Europa League and on 21 December 2011 in a 3–1 loss against Borussia Mönchengladbach in the German Cup.

== Coaching career statistics ==
As of 15 January 2017.

Team	From	To	Record								
Team	From	To	M	W	D	L	GF	GA	GD	Win %	Ref.
St. Pauli	1 April 1992	30 June 1992	6	3	2	1	8	7	+1	50.00	
St. Pauli	25 September 1992	30 June 1994	70	25	26	19	84	77	+7	35.71	
Duisburg	24 March 2000	30 June 2000	9	1	2	6	11	22	−11	11.11	
Duisburg	16 October 2000	30 June 2001	29	11	9	9	37	28	+9	37.93	
Schalke	16 March 2011	20 March 2011	1	0	0	1	0	2	−2	0.00	
Schalke	22 September 2011	26 September 2011	1	1	0	0	4	2	+2	100.00	
Schalke	14 December 2011		1	1	0	0	3	0	+3	100.00	
Schalke	21 December 2011		1	0	0	1	1	3	−2	0.00	
Total			118	42	39	37	148	141	+7	35.59	—
