= 1994–95 2. Bundesliga =

21st season of the second-tier football league in Germany

2. Bundesliga
- Season: 1994–95
- Champions: F.C. Hansa Rostock
- Promoted: F.C. Hansa Rostock; FC St. Pauli; Fortuna Düsseldorf
- Relegated: 1. FC Saarbrücken; FC Homburg; FSV Frankfurt
- Matches: 306
- Top goalscorer: Jürgen Rische (18 goals)
- Average attendance: 7,315

The 1994–95 2. Bundesliga season was the twenty-first season of the 2. Bundesliga, the second tier of the German football league system. This was the last season in which two points were awarded for a win. From the following season onwards the league moved to a three points for a win system.

F.C. Hansa Rostock, FC St. Pauli and Fortuna Düsseldorf were promoted to the Bundesliga while 1. FC Saarbrücken, FC 08 Homburg and FSV Frankfurt were relegated to the Regionalliga.

== League table ==
For the 1994–95 season Fortuna Düsseldorf, FSV Frankfurt and FSV Zwickau were newly promoted to the 2. Bundesliga from the Oberliga while 1. FC Nürnberg, SG Wattenscheid 09 and VfB Leipzig had been relegated to the league from the Bundesliga.

Locations of the participating teams of the 1994–95 season

Pos	Team	Pld	W	D	L	GF	GA	GD	Pts	Promotion or relegation
1	Hansa Rostock (C, P)	34	19	8	7	66	30	+36	46	Promotion to Bundesliga
2	FC St. Pauli (P)	34	15	14	5	58	33	+25	44	Promotion to Bundesliga
3	Fortuna Düsseldorf (P)	34	15	13	6	51	35	+16	43	Promotion to Bundesliga
4	VfL Wolfsburg	34	15	13	6	51	40	+11	43	
5	Waldhof Mannheim	34	13	16	5	48	35	+13	42	
6	SV Meppen	34	15	11	8	54	38	+16	41	
7	1. FC Saarbrücken (Note: 1. FC Saarbrücken were denied a license due to financial problems and were therefore relegated.) (R)	34	11	13	10	45	43	+2	35	Relegation to Regionalliga (Note: FSV Frankfurt was relegated to Regionalliga Süd. 1. FC Saarbrücken and FC Homburg were relegated to Regionalliga West/Südwest.)
8	Fortuna Köln	34	13	8	13	55	49	+6	34	
9	Chemnitzer FC	34	11	12	11	47	50	−3	34	
10	SG Wattenscheid 09	34	11	11	12	50	52	−2	33	
11	Hertha BSC	34	10	12	12	41	45	−4	32	
12	Hannover 96	34	10	11	13	52	50	+2	31	
13	VfB Leipzig	34	11	8	15	44	44	0	30	
14	Mainz 05	34	10	10	14	50	55	−5	30	
15	1. FC Nürnberg	34	8	14	12	38	47	−9	30	
16	FSV Zwickau	34	6	17	11	32	50	−18	29	
17	FC Homburg (R)	34	8	7	19	41	63	−22	23	Relegation to Regionalliga
18	FSV Frankfurt (R)	34	3	6	25	39	103	−64	12	Relegation to Regionalliga

Source: Bundesliga.de
Rules for classification: 1) points; 2) goal difference; 3) number of goals scored.
(C) Champions; (P) Promoted; (R) Relegated

== Results ==
Home \ Away	BSC	CFC	F95	FSV	H96	HOM	FKO	LEI	M05	WMA	SVM	FCN	ROS	FCS	STP	SGW	WOB	ZWI
Hertha BSC	—	0–0	0–0	0–1	2–0	2–2	6–2	0–3	1–1	0–0	5–1	1–1	0–1	2–1	1–1	3–1	1–3	2–1
Chemnitzer FC	2–0	—	0–2	4–2	1–1	3–0	0–1	2–0	1–1	1–1	2–0	0–1	1–1	1–1	3–2	3–0	1–1	1–1
Fortuna Düsseldorf	1–1	1–2	—	2–2	1–1	2–0	3–1	4–2	1–0	1–1	2–1	1–1	2–0	0–0	0–1	1–1	1–1	1–1
FSV Frankfurt	1–3	2–1	1–2	—	1–1	1–2	0–5	1–1	1–4	0–3	1–3	1–2	1–1	0–3	1–3	1–5	1–2	3–0
Hannover 96	4–1	1–4	0–3	7–0	—	4–3	4–1	1–1	2–0	2–2	1–0	6–3	2–1	0–0	0–1	0–1	1–1	1–1
FC Homburg	4–1	5–1	0–2	4–1	0–2	—	0–0	2–1	1–2	1–1	0–0	3–0	0–0	0–1	1–4	0–1	1–1	3–1
Fortuna Köln	0–0	3–0	0–1	6–2	1–3	3–0	—	0–2	3–1	0–2	2–2	1–1	1–0	4–0	2–2	0–0	3–1	5–0
VfB Leipzig	0–1	2–3 (Note: The VfB Leipzig v Chemnitzer FC match from 11 June 1995, which finished with a score of 2–3, was annulled by the DFB and was required to be replayed due to VfB Leipzig player Ronald Werner being wrongly sent off by the referee. The replay took place on 14 June 1995 and finished with a score of 1–0. However, the decision to replay the match was overturned by order of FIFA in July 1995, with the original score of 2–3 standing.)	1–2	3–0	3–1	1–0	2–0	—	0–2	1–0	0–0	0–0	0–1	2–0	2–0	0–2	2–3	0–0
Mainz 05	1–1	2–5	0–2	7–1	3–2	4–1	4–2	0–3	—	1–1	1–1	1–0	2–2	1–1	1–1	2–0	2–0	2–2
Waldhof Mannheim	3–0	3–0	1–0	3–2	2–1	4–1	0–3	1–3	4–0	—	0–0	2–1	0–2	2–2	2–1	1–1	2–2	2–1
SV Meppen	3–0	3–0	2–4	2–2	1–0	1–0	3–1	1–0	3–0	0–0	—	1–2	2–1	5–1	3–2	2–2	3–1	2–2
1. FC Nürnberg	1–1	2–1	4–1	3–1	0–0	3–0	1–1	3–1	1–1	0–0	0–2 (Note: The 1. FC Nürnberg v SV Meppen match from 25 February 1995, which finished with a score of 2–0, was later awarded to SV Meppen with a score of 0–2 due to 1. FC Nürnberg having more than the three allowed foreign players on the pitch.)	—	0–1	0–2	1–1	1–1	0–0	1–1
Hansa Rostock	2–1	5–0	3–3	4–2	3–0	2–3	2–0	1–0	1–0	0–1	2–2	5–0	—	3–2	3–0	3–0	6–0	2–0
1. FC Saarbrücken	2–0	1–1	1–2	2–1	3–0	0–0	1–2	3–3	1–0	4–0	2–1	2–1	2–2	—	1–2	2–0	0–0	1–1
FC St. Pauli	1–1	0–0	2–1	3–0	1–1	5–0	2–0	2–2	3–1	1–1	2–1	3–2	2–0	0–0	—	4–1	0–0	5–0
SG Wattenscheid	0–1	2–2	0–0	6–2	2–1	4–2	0–1	4–2	3–2	2–2	0–2	0–0	0–4	4–1	0–0	—	2–2	3–0
VfL Wolfsburg	1–0	3–1	3–1	4–1	2–1	2–1	3–0	1–1	2–0	0–0	0–0	3–2	0–1	2–1	1–1	3–1	—	0–1
FSV Zwickau	0–3	0–0	1–1	2–2	1–1	2–0	1–1	3–0	2–1	1–1	0–1	2–0	1–1	0–0	0–0	2–1	1–3	—

Source: DFB
Legend: Blue = home team win; Yellow = draw; Red = away team win.

== Top scorers ==
The league's top scorers:

Goals	Player	Team
18	(Germany) Jürgen Rische	VfB Leipzig
16	(Germany) Torsten Gütschow	Hannover 96
15	(Germany) Stefan Beinlich	Hansa Rostock
15	(Germany) Rainer Rauffmann	SV Meppen
14	(Germany) Jan Sievers	SV Meppen
14	(Germany) Thomas Ziemer	1. FSV Mainz 05
13	(United States) Joe-Max Moore	1. FC Saarbrücken
12	(Germany) Jörg Kirsten	SV Waldhof Mannheim
12	(Denmark) Miklos Molnar	FSV Frankfurt
12	(Germany) Jens Scharping	FC St. Pauli
