= Klaus-Peter Nemet =

German footballer and manager

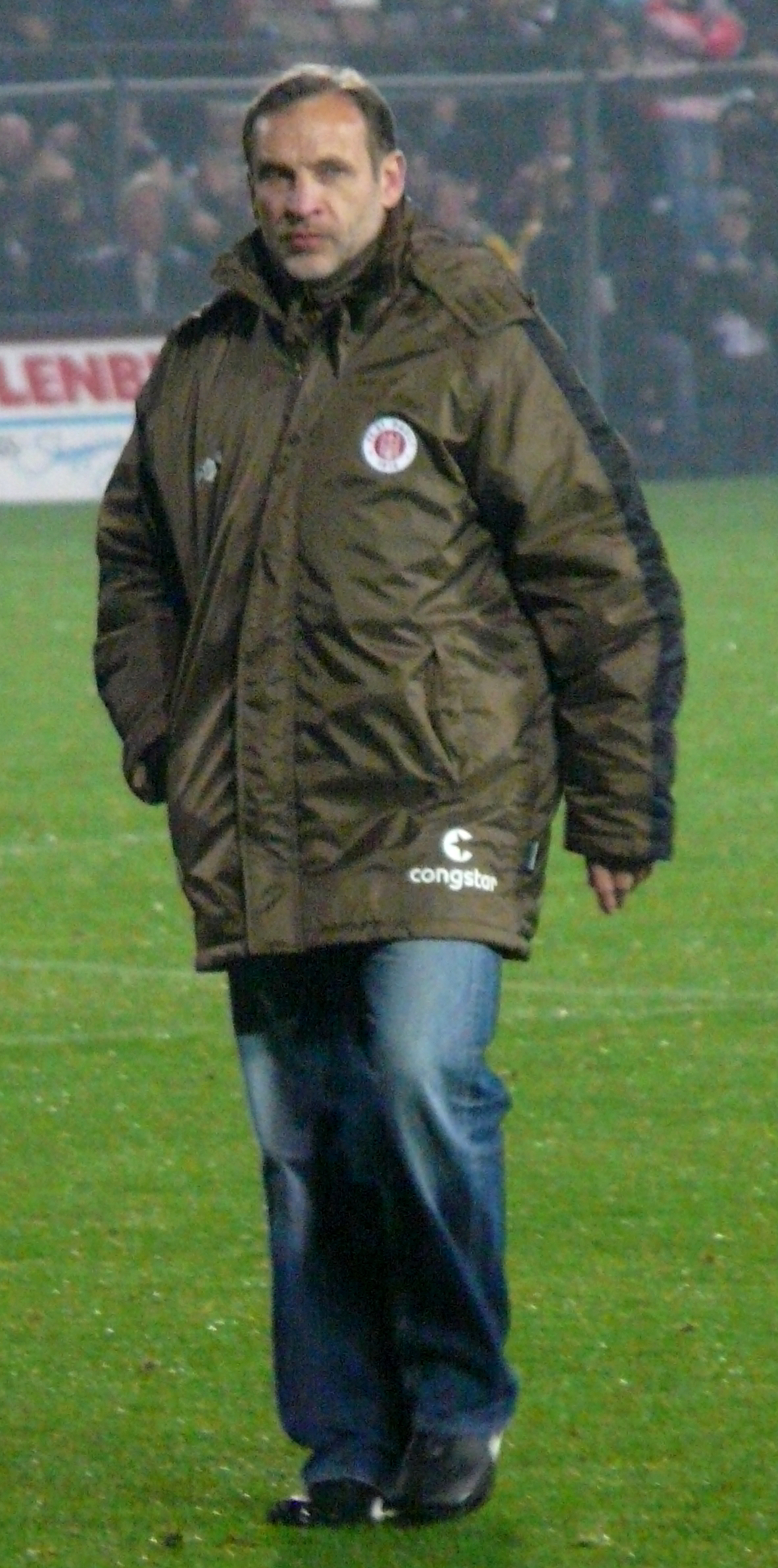

Personal information
- Date of birth: 9 December 1953 (age 72)
- Place of birth: Hamburg, West Germany
- Height: 1.76 m (5 ft 9 in)

Team information
- Current team: SC Weiche Flensburg 08 (assistant)

Managerial career
- Years: Team
- VfB Oldenburg (assistant)
- –1997: FC St. Pauli (assistant)
- 1997: FC St. Pauli
- 1998: VfB Oldenburg
- 2002–2004: Tenerife (assistant)
- 2005–2011: FC St. Pauli (goalkeeper coach)
- 2006–2007: FC St. Pauli II
- 2011–2012: 1899 Hoffenheim (assistant)
- 2012–2013: 1. FC Köln (assistant)
- 2015–2017: Atlético Baleares (assistant)
- 2019–: SC Weiche Flensburg 08 (assistant)

Klaus-Peter Nemet (born 9 December 1953) is a German football coach who works as assistant coach at SC Weiche Flensburg 08.

He was the manager of St. Pauli at the end of the 1996–97 season when they were relegated from the Bundesliga. The club lost all six games they played under his leadership. From 2005 to 2011, he worked as a goalkeeping coach with FC St. Pauli. Nemet was named as assistant coach of TSG 1899 Hoffenheim on 20 July 2011.
