= Klaus Thomforde =

German association football player

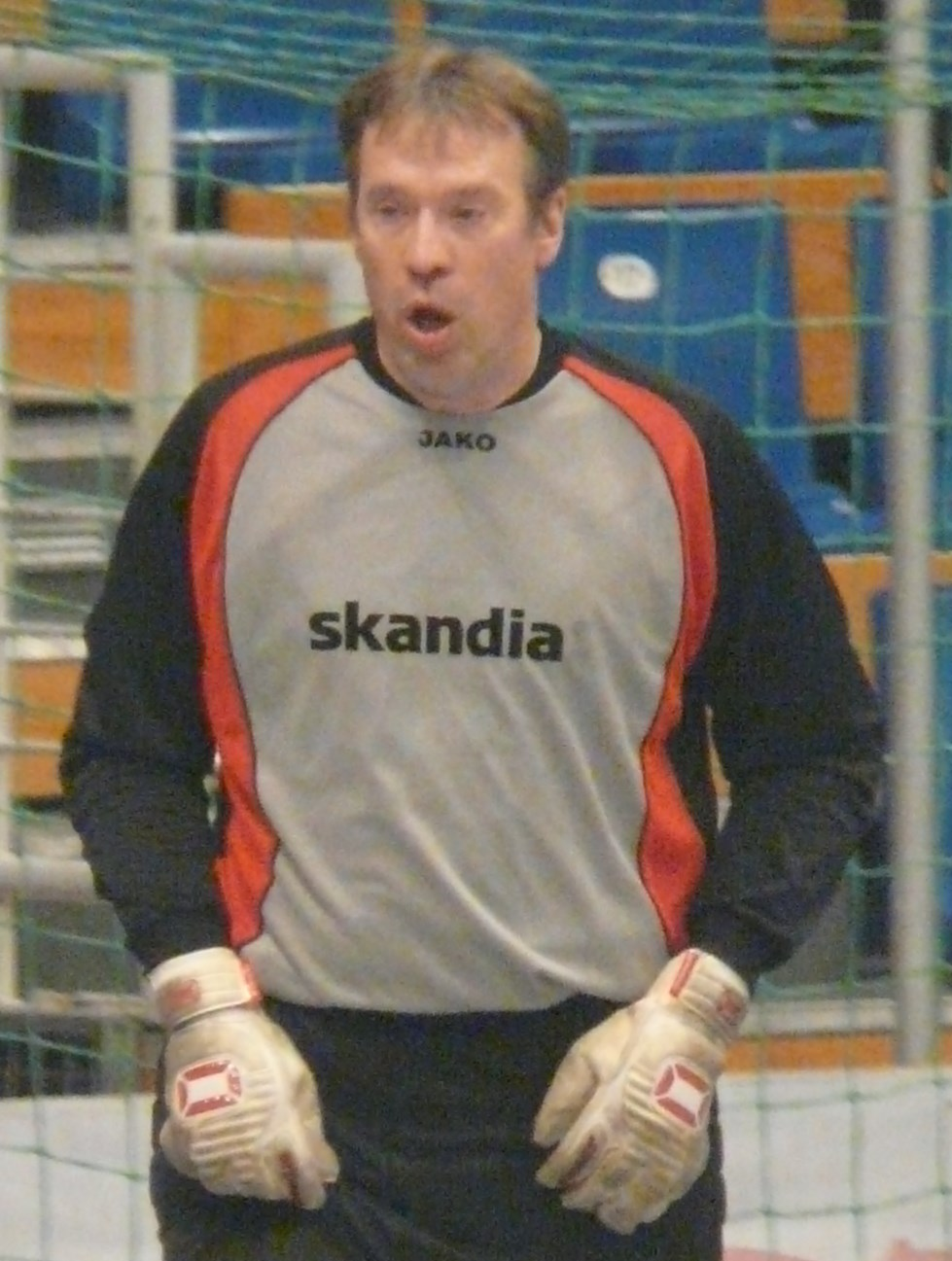
- Thomforde in 2010

Personal information
- Full name: Klaus Hinrich Thomforde
- Date of birth: 1 December 1962 (age 63)
- Place of birth: Minstedt, West Germany
- Height: 1.91 m (6 ft 3 in)
- Position: Goalkeeper

Team information
- Current team: Holstein Kiel (goalkeeping coach)

Senior career*
Years	Team	Apps	(Gls)
–1983	SC Bremervörde		
1983–2000	FC St. Pauli	317	(0)

Managerial career
- 2002–2003: FC St. Pauli (goalkeeping coach)
- 2003–2004: Union Berlin (goalkeeping coach)
- 2004–2010: Holstein Kiel (goalkeeping coach)
- 2005–2007: Lithuania (goalkeeping coach)
- 2006: Holstein Kiel (caretaker)
- 2006–2010: Germany U21 (goalkeeping coach)
- * Club domestic league appearances and goals

Klaus Hinrich Thomforde (born 1 December 1962) is a German former professional footballer who played as a goalkeeper. He spent his entire professional career with FC St. Pauli. Following his retirement as a player he became a coach.
