= Tihomir Bulat =

Croatian footballer

Personal information
- Date of birth: 28 July 1974 (age 52)
- Place of birth: Šibenik, SFR Yugoslavia
- Height: 1.91 m (6 ft 3 in)
- Position: Goalkeeper

Senior career*
Years	Team	Apps	(Gls)
1997–2001	Šibenik	72	(0)
2001–2003	St. Pauli	30	(0)
2003–2004	Rijeka	11	(0)
2005–2006	Međimurje	36	(0)
2006–2008	Trogir	19	(0)
2008–2010	RNK Split	16	(0)

Managerial career
- 2017–2018: Hajduk Split (goalkeeping coach)
- * Club domestic league appearances and goals

Tihomir Bulat (Croatian pronunciation: [tîxomiːr bǔlat]; born 28 July 1974) is a Croatian former professional footballer who played as a goalkeeper.

== Club career ==
He spent one season in the Bundesliga with FC St. Pauli during his career and retired at the end of the 2009–10 season.
