= Ingo Porges =

German footballer

Personal information
- Date of birth: 22 August 1938 (age 88)
- Place of birth: Hamburg, Germany
- Position: Midfielder

Senior career*
Years	Team	Apps	(Gls)
1955–1968	FC St. Pauli		

International career
1960	West Germany	1	(0)
- * Club domestic league appearances and goals

Ingo Porges (born 22 August 1938) is a German former footballer who played as a midfielder for FC St. Pauli. He made one appearance for the West Germany national team.
