= Peter Osterhoff =

German footballer

Personal information
- Date of birth: 25 August 1937 (age 89)
- Place of birth: Hamburg, Germany
- Position: Forward

Senior career*
Years	Team	Apps	(Gls)
1958–1970	FC St. Pauli		
- * Club domestic league appearances and goals

Peter Osterhoff (born 25 August 1937) is a German former professional footballer who played as a forward for FC St. Pauli. He is the club's most successful goal scorer and was voted part of the club's team of the century by FC St. Pauli's fans.
