= Matías Cenci =

Argentine footballer

Personal information
- Full name: Matías Esteban Cenci
- Date of birth: 12 February 1978 (age 48)
- Place of birth: Quilmes, Argentina
- Height: 1.84 m (6 ft 0 in)
- Position: Forward

Senior career*
Years	Team	Apps	(Gls)
1994–1998 y 2000-2001	Quilmes	54	(10)
1998–1999 y 1999-2000	Atlético Madrileño	12	(1)
2001–2002	FC St. Pauli	15	(1)
2003–2004	FC Luzern	36	(17)
2004–2006	Darmstadt 98	61	(18)
2006–2007	SV Wehen	31	(14)
2007–2009	FSV Frankfurt	82	(29)
2010	Sandhausen	12	(0)
2010–2011	Darmstadt 98	13	(2)
- * Club domestic league appearances and goals

Matías Esteban Cenci (born 12 February 1978) is an Argentine former professional footballer who played as a forward.
