= Moudachirou Amadou =

Beninese retired footballer

Personal information
- Date of birth: 11 December 1971 (age 54)
- Place of birth: Cotonou, Benin
- Height: 1.84 m (6 ft 0 in)
- Position: Defender

Youth career
- 1990–1992: Dragons

Senior career*
Years	Team	Apps	(Gls)
1993	FC Rochefort		
1993–1997	Erzgebirge Aue	12	(2)
1997–1999	Energie Cottbus	59	(4)
1999–2000	Karlsruher SC	24	(2)
2000–2001	Hannover 96	22	(0)
2001–2003	FC St. Pauli	22	(0)
2004–2005	Holstein Quickborn	4	(0)
2007–2008	Holstein Quickborn	1	(0)
2008–2009	TSV Bernhausen	24	(2)

International career
1990–2003	Benin	22	(0)

Managerial career
- 2007–2008: Holstein Quickborn U-12
- 2008–: TSV Berhausen U-19
- * Club domestic league appearances and goals

Moudachirou Amadou (born 11 December 1971) is a Beninese former professional footballer who played as a defender.

== Playing career ==
Amadou spent one season in the Bundesliga with FC St. Pauli.

== Coaching career ==
From signing in summer 2008 with TSV Bernhausen Amadou worked as teamchef, formerly coaching the Bambinis of TuS Holstein Quickborn.

== Personal life ==
Amadou is in partnership with the German Daniela Zollweg from Cottbus and holds a German passport. His son Amiro Amadou is also a professional footballer.
