= Jens Scharping =

German footballer (born 1974)

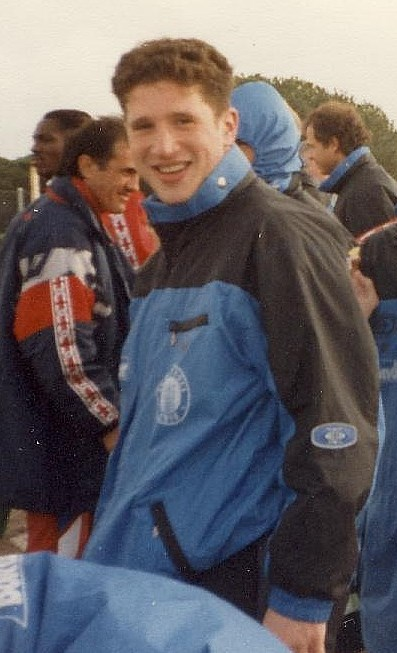
- Scharping in 1996

Personal information
- Date of birth: 16 July 1974 (age 52)
- Place of birth: Hamburg, West Germany
- Position: Striker

Youth career
- –1993: Eimsbütteler TV

Senior career*
Years	Team	Apps	(Gls)
1993–1998	FC St. Pauli	101	(32)
1998–1999	Rot-Weiß Oberhausen	10	(0)
1999–2000	1. SC Norderstedt	7	(0)
2000–2001	Lüneburger SK	33	(16)
2001–2004	VfB Lübeck	86	(29)
2004–2006	Alemannia Aachen	23	(3)
2006–2007	FC St. Pauli	21	(2)
Total		281	(82)
- * Club domestic league appearances and goals

Jens Scharping (born 16 July 1974) is a German former professional footballer who played as a striker. He spent two seasons in the Bundesliga with FC St. Pauli, as well as eight seasons in the 2. Bundesliga with St. Pauli, Rot-Weiß Oberhausen, VfB Lübeck, and Alemannia Aachen.
