= Guy Acolatse =

Togolese footballer (born 1942)

Personal information
- Full name: Guy Kokou Acolatse
- Date of birth: 28 April 1942 (age 84)
- Place of birth: Togo
- Position: Attacking midfielder

Senior career*
Years	Team	Apps	(Gls)
1963–1966	FC St. Pauli		
1966–1969	HSV Barmbek-Uhlenhorst		
1970–1973	FC St. Pauli II		

International career
- Togo
- * Club domestic league appearances and goals

Guy Kokou Acolatse (born 28 April 1942) is a Togolese former professional footballer who played as an attacking midfielder. He was the first black professional footballer to play in Germany.

== Career ==
Acolatse made his debut for the Togo national team at the age of 17. He joined one of the two major clubs in Lomé, the Togolese capital, from Kpalimé. He was courted by French and Belgian clubs but rejected their offers.

German coach Otto Westphal, who had coached the Togo national team and later became FC St. Pauli coach, convinced Acolatse to join the club in August 1963. The club played in the Regionalliga Nord, the German second tier at the time. He made his debut in a 4–1 league win against Altona 93. Acolatse spent three years at the club, making 43 appearances and scoring six goals. He then played a further three years for HSV Barmbek-Uhlenhorst, another Hamburg-based side. He returned to FC St. Pauli in 1970 to play for the club's second team, where he played for three years, occasionally helping out the first team.

== Personal life ==
Acolatse moved to Saint-Denis, Paris in 1980 where he coached the third team of Paris Saint-Germain and worked at Ford. As of April 2020, he was retired and living in the Paris suburb where he trained children in an honorary capacity.

In 2021, he featured in Schwarze Adler, a documentary detailing the experiences of black players in German professional football.
