= Yakubu Adamu =

Nigerian footballer (born 1981)

Personal information
- Date of birth: 4 October 1981 (age 45)
- Place of birth: Kaduna, Nigeria
- Height: 1.87 m (6 ft 2 in)
- Position: Defender

Youth career
- –1998: Ranchers Bees
- 1999–2000: Iwuanyanwu Nationale

Senior career*
Years	Team	Apps	(Gls)
2000–2001	SG Wattenscheid 09	22	(2)
2001–2003	FC St. Pauli	29	(0)
2003–2004	Schalke 04 II	17	(1)
2004–2005	Germania Gladbeck		
2005–2008	Chemnitzer FC	59	(5)
2009	FSV Zwickau		

International career
	Nigeria	1	(0)
- * Club domestic league appearances and goals

Yakubu Adamu(born 4 October 1981) is a Nigerian former professional footballer who played as defender. He played for one season in the Bundesliga with FC St. Pauli.
