= Michael Lorkowski =

German footballer and manager

Personal information
- Date of birth: 26 February 1955 (age 71)
- Place of birth: Hamburg, West Germany
- Position: Midfielder

Senior career*
Years	Team	Apps	(Gls)
1973–1977	Phönix Lübeck		
1977–1982	HSV Barmbek-Uhlenhorst		

Managerial career
- 1982–1986: FC St. Pauli
- 1986–1988: Holstein Kiel
- 1988–1990: 1. SC Norderstedt
- 1990–1992: Hannover 96
- 1992–1993: FC St. Pauli
- 1993–1994: Wuppertaler SV
- 1994–1996: VfB Lübeck
- 1996–1998: Eintracht Braunschweig
- 1999–2000: Holstein Kiel
- 2000: VfL Osnabrück
- 2003–2005: MTV Wolfenbüttel
- 2005–2006: SSV Vorsfelde
- * Club domestic league appearances and goals

Michael Lorkowski (born 26 February 1955 in Hamburg) is a German football manager and former player.

His greatest achievement was winning the 1991–92 DFB-Pokal with Hannover 96, while the team was still in the 2. Bundesliga. In an unlikely triumph, they defeated Borussia Mönchengladbach on penalties on 23 May 1992 to become the first - and thus far, only - non-Bundesliga side to lift the trophy.

He also achieved three promotions to the 2. Bundesliga with FC St. Pauli (1984 and 1986) and VfB Lübeck (1995).

In recent years, he has devoted himself more to other pursuits. He has worked as a sports teacher at diploma level and also explored his love of sailing by captaining voyages off the coast of Schleswig-Holstein.
