= Dirk Dammann =

German former professional footballer

Personal information
- Date of birth: 14 August 1967 (age 59)
- Place of birth: Stade, West Germany
- Height: 1.91 m (6 ft 3 in)
- Position: Defender

Senior career*
Years	Team	Apps	(Gls)
1990–1999	FC St. Pauli	260	(7)
2000–2007	VfL Stade		
Total		260	(7)
- * Club domestic league appearances and goals

Dirk Dammann (born 14 August 1967) is a German former professional footballer who played as a defender.

== Career ==
Dammann played professionally for FC St. Pauli. He later played in the Oberliga Hamburg with VfL Stade, before retiring in May 2007.
