= Marco Zallmann =

German footballer (born 1967)

Personal information
- Date of birth: November 17, 1967 (age 58)
- Place of birth: Neubrandenburg, East Germany
- Height: 1.90 m (6 ft 3 in)
- Position: Defender

Senior career*
Years	Team	Apps	(Gls)
–1992	Post Neubrandenburg		
1992–2001	Hansa Rostock	201	(9)
2001–2003	VfB Lübeck	28	(0)
2003–2006	TSG Neustrelitz	37	(0)
- * Club domestic league appearances and goals

Marco Zallmann (born November 17, 1967) is a German former professional footballer who played as a defender.
