= Thomas Meggle =

German footballer (born 1975)

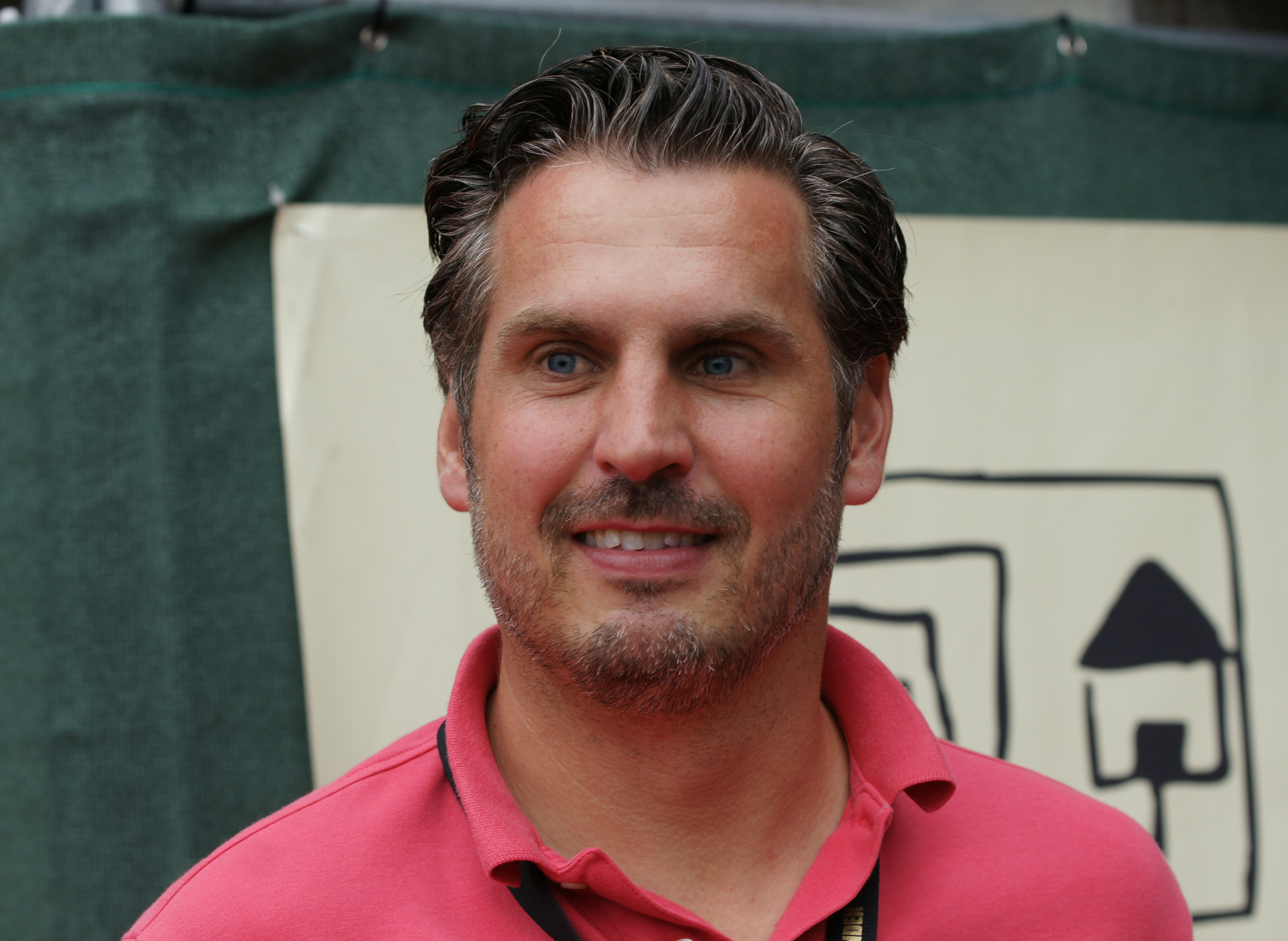
- Meggle in 2014

Personal information
- Date of birth: 22 February 1975 (age 51)
- Place of birth: Munich, West Germany
- Height: 1.80 m (5 ft 11 in)
- Position: Midfielder

Youth career
- SF Harteck München
- Wacker München
- –1993: FC Augsburg
- 1993–1994: TSV Schwaben Augsburg

Senior career*
Years	Team	Apps	(Gls)
1994–1997	FC Starnberg		
1997–1999	FC St. Pauli	36	(2)
1999–2000	1860 Munich	0	(0)
2000–2002	FC St. Pauli	24	(7)
2002–2005	Hansa Rostock	38	(1)
2005–2010	FC St. Pauli	75	(19)

Managerial career
- 2011–2013: FC St. Pauli (assistant)
- 2012: FC St. Pauli
- 2013–2014: FC St. Pauli II
- 2014: FC St. Pauli
- * Club domestic league appearances and goals

Thomas Meggle (born 22 February 1975) is a German former professional footballer who played as a midfielder. He is on the board of directors at Scottish club Dunfermline Athletic.

== Club career ==
Meggle made his debut on the professional league level in the 2. Bundesliga for FC St. Pauli on 27 July 1997 when he started in a game against Greuther Fürth. He retired at the end of the 2009–10 season.

== Post-playing career ==
On 3 September 2014, Meggle became the head coach of FC St. Pauli replacing Roland Vrabec. He was replaced on 16 December 2014 and became sporting director.

He became part the board of directors at Scottish club Dunfermline Athletic in July 2021.
