= André Trulsen =

German footballer and manager

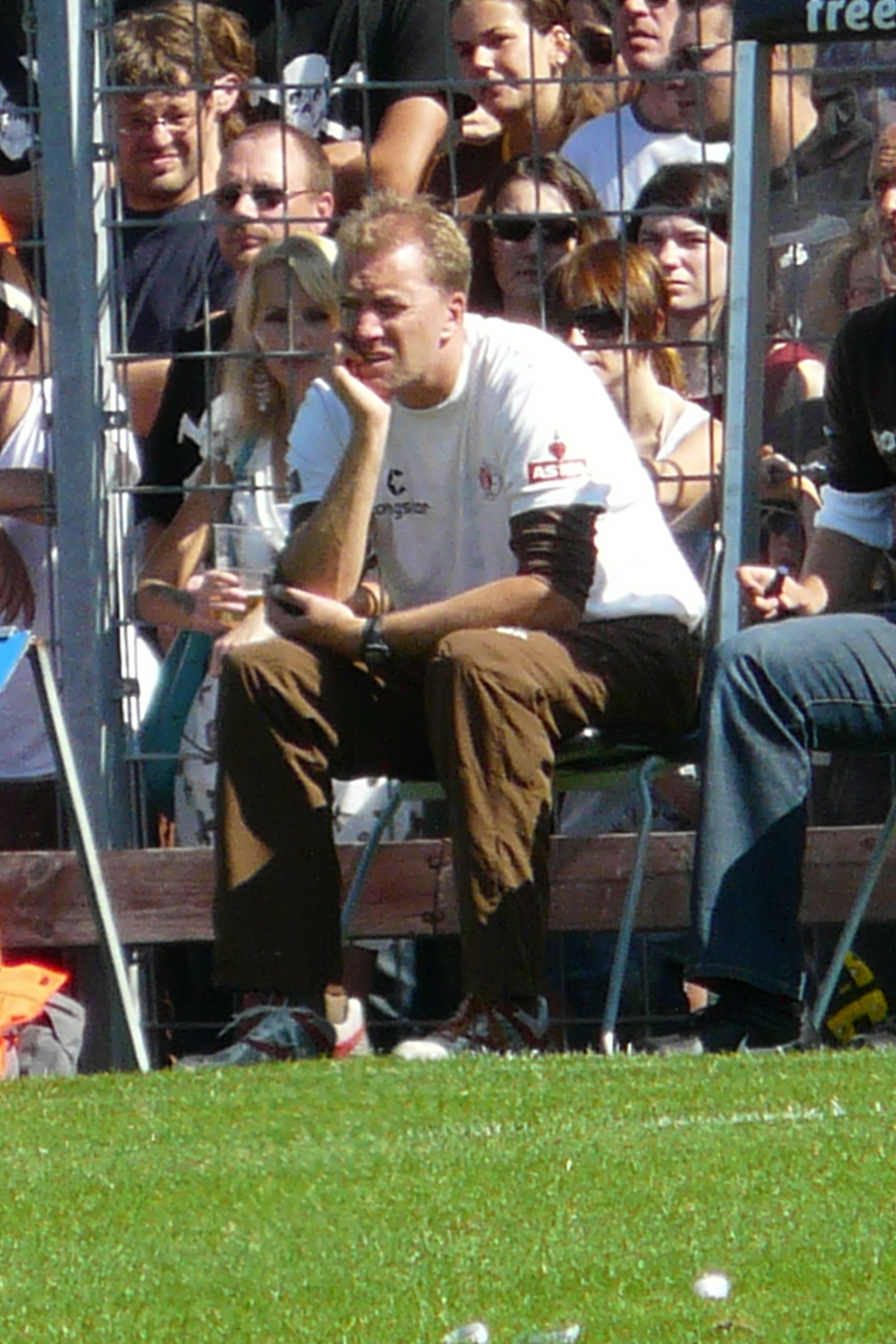
- Trulsen with St. Pauli in 2008

Personal information
- Date of birth: 28 May 1965 (age 61)
- Place of birth: Hamburg, West Germany
- Height: 1.91 m (6 ft 3 in)
- Positions: Defender; midfielder

Youth career
- HEBC Hamburg
- Osdorfer Born
- 1984–1986: SV Lurup

Senior career*
Years	Team	Apps	(Gls)
1986–1991	FC St. Pauli	162	(2)
1991–1993	1. FC Köln	32	(2)
1993–1994	SV Lurup	23	(0)
1994–2002	FC St. Pauli	220	(26)
2002–2004	Holstein Kiel	23	(1)
2004–2005	FC St. Pauli	1	(0)
Total		461	(31)

Managerial career
- 2002–2004: Holstein Kiel II
- 2007–2008: FC St. Pauli
- * Club domestic league appearances and goals

André Trulsen (born 28 May 1965) is a German former footballer who played as a defender or midfielder. He is best known for his long association with FC St. Pauli, where he made over 400 appearances.

In 2010, as part of FC St. Pauli's 100th anniversary celebrations, fans voted Trulsen as one of the greatest players in the club's history during his three stints at the club
