= Holger Stanislawski =

German football manager (born 1969)

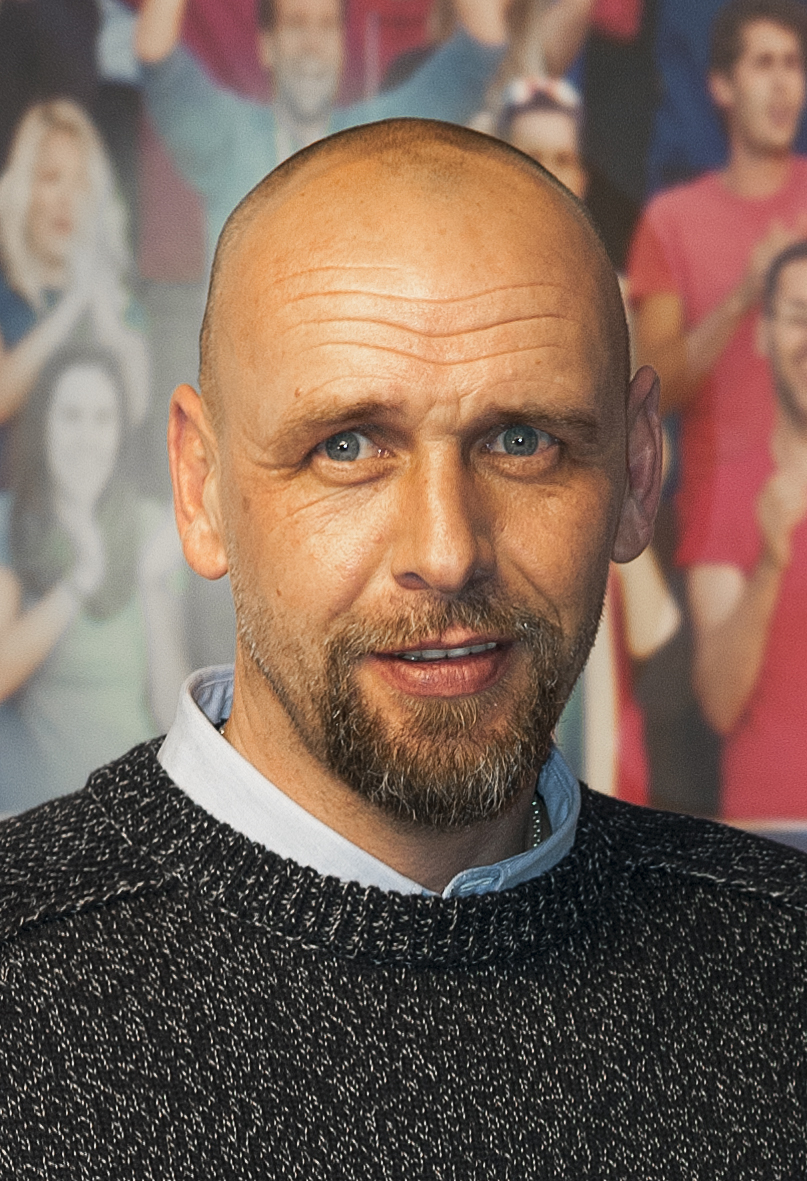
- Stanislawski in 2016

Personal information
- Full name: Holger Stanislawski
- Date of birth: 26 September 1969 (age 57)
- Place of birth: Hamburg, West Germany
- Height: 1.87 m (6 ft 2 in)
- Position: Defender

Senior career*
Years	Team	Apps	(Gls)
1993–2004	FC St. Pauli	257	(18)

Managerial career
- 2006–2007: FC St. Pauli
- 2008–2011: FC St. Pauli
- 2011–2012: TSG Hoffenheim
- 2012–2013: 1. FC Köln
- * Club domestic league appearances and goals

Holger Stanislawski (born 26 September 1969) is a German football manager and former player.

== Managerial career ==
=== FC St. Pauli ===
Stanislawski became interim manager of FC St. Pauli on 22 November 2006 after Andreas Bergmann was sacked by the club. André Trulsen became the new manager, ending Stanislawski's reign as interim manager. Stanislawski returned as manager on 27 June 2008 after spending time in Cologne getting his coaching certificate. Stanislawski left at the end of the 2010–11 season in order to manage TSG Hoffenheim. Stanislawski spent 18 years at FC St. Pauli.

=== TSG Hoffenheim ===
On 19 April 2011, TSG Hoffenheim announced he would become their new manager when the new season started. On 9 February 2012, he left Hoffenheim after having his contract terminated by club advisory board.

=== 1. FC Köln ===
Stanislawski was hired as the new coach for 1. FC Köln on 14 May 2012. Stanislawski had his contract terminated with his final match on 19 May 2013 against FC Ingolstadt 04.

== Career statistics ==
As of 19 May 2013

Team	From	To	Record							
Team	From	To	G	W	D	L	GF	GA	GD	Win %
FC St. Pauli	22 November 2006	9 July 2007	20	12	5	3	34	12	+22	60.00
FC St. Pauli	27 June 2008	30 June 2011	106	43	16	47	162	167	−5	40.57
TSG Hoffenheim	1 July 2011	9 February 2012	24	9	6	9	29	28	+1	37.50
1. FC Köln	14 May 2012	19 May 2013	37	15	13	9	46	36	+10	40.54
Total			187	79	40	68	271	243	+28	42.25
