= FC St. Pauli =

German sports club

St. Pauli
- Full name: Fußball-Club St. Pauli von 1910 e.V.
- Nicknames: Kiezkicker (Neighbourhood Kickers); Freibeuter der Liga (League Buccaneers)
- Founded: 15 May 1910; 116 years ago
- Stadium: Millerntor-Stadion
- Capacity: 29,546
- President: Oke Göttlich
- Head coach: Marcel Rapp
- League: 2. Bundesliga
- 2025–26: Bundesliga, 18th of 18 (relegated)
- Website: fcstpauli.com
Home colours	Away colours	Third colours

Fußball-Club St. Pauli von 1910 e.V., commonly known as simply St. Pauli (German pronunciation: [ɛfˌtseː zaŋkt ˈpaʊli]), is a German professional football club based in the St. Pauli district of Hamburg. The team will play in the 2. Bundesliga for the 2026–27 season following relegation from the Bundesliga in 2025–26.

The football department is part of a larger sports club that also has departments in rugby (FC St. Pauli Rugby), baseball, bowling, boxing (FC St. Pauli Boxen), chess, cycling, handball, roller derby (Harbor Girls Hamburg), skittles, softball, table tennis, and since 2011, marathon. Until the end of 2013, the club also had a department in American football, but it was dissolved because it lacked the youth team required in order to hold a men's team. As of April 2023, FC St. Pauli has 30,400 members.

The men's professional football team dropped down to the Regionalliga in 2003, at that time the third highest football division in Germany and remained there for four years. In 2007, they won promotion back to the 2. Bundesliga, the German second tier. In 2010, they won promotion back to the top-flight Bundesliga, but were immediately relegated the following season. Their current tenure in the top-flight dates to their promotion in 2023–24 season.

FC St. Pauli has an intra-city rivalry with Hamburger SV, with whom they contest the Hamburg derby, the only cross-city derby currently featured in the Bundesliga. The club also has a more recent rivalry with Hansa Rostock, known as the Political derby, or even the Fear derby, reflecting the divergent political identities of the two clubs.

Although the club has been only modestly successful, it is widely recognised for its distinctive social culture and has a large popular following as one of the country's "Kult" clubs. FC St. Pauli and supporters are strongly identified with their support of left-wing politics.

== History ==
=== Early years ===
The club began its existence in 1899 as a loose, informal group of football enthusiasts within the Hamburg-St.Pauli Turnverein 1862. This group did not play its first match until 1907, when they faced a similar side assembled from the local Aegir swimming club. Officially established on 15 May 1910, the club played as St. Pauli TV in the Kreisliga Groß-Hamburg (Alsterkreis) until 1924, when a separate football side called St. Pauli was formed. The team played as an undistinguished lower-to-mid table side until making their first appearance in 1934 in the top-flight Gauliga Nordmark, 1 of 16 premier level divisions created in the re-organization of German football that took place under the Third Reich. They were immediately relegated, but returned to the top flight in 1936. Relegated again in 1940, St. Pauli re-appeared in the Gauliga Hamburg in 1942, and played there until the end of World War II.

=== Post-war football ===
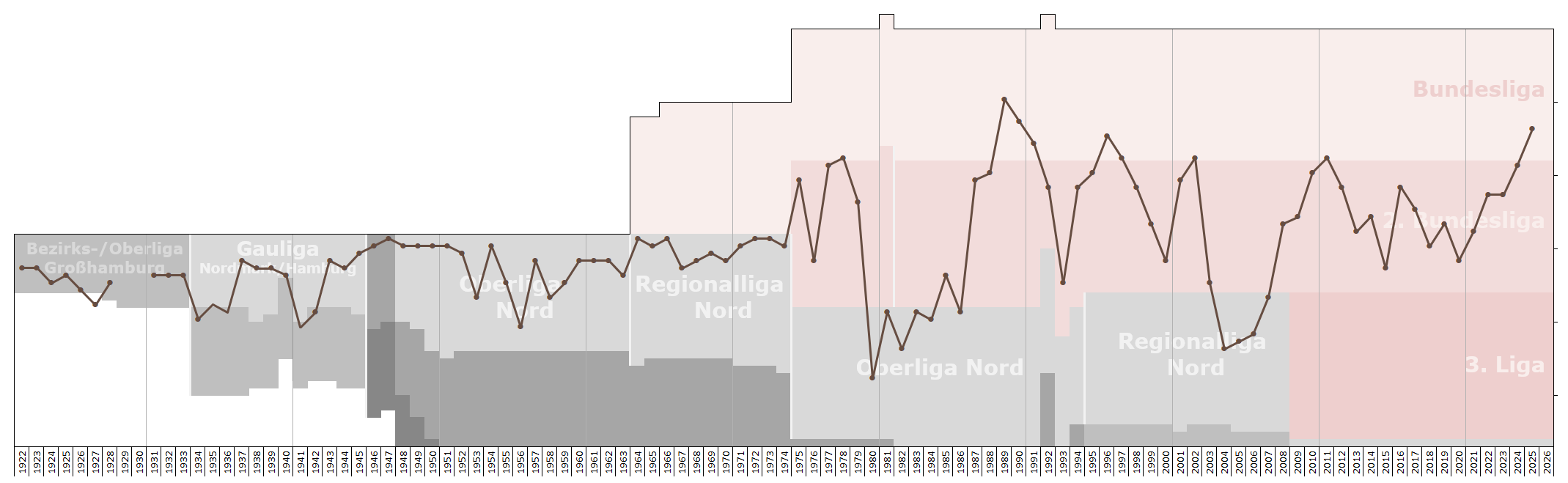
Historical chart of St. Pauli league performance

After the war, the club resumed play in the Oberliga Nord in 1947. A second-place finish in the 1947–48 season led St. Pauli to its first appearance in the national championship rounds. They advanced as far as the semi-finals, where they were knocked out 2–3 by eventual champions 1. FC Nürnberg. The club continued to play well throughout the early 1950s, but were unable to overtake rivals Hamburger SV, finishing in second place in five of the next seven seasons, and going out in the early rounds in each of their championship-round appearances from 1949 to 1951. In the late 1950s and into the early 1960s, St. Pauli were overtaken by rivals such as Werder Bremen and VfL Osnabrück, but finished fourth a number of times.

=== Promotion to the Bundesliga ===
In 1963, the Bundesliga — West Germany's new top-flight professional league — was formed. Hamburger SV, Werder Bremen, and Eintracht Braunschweig joined the new circuit as the top-finishers from the Oberliga Nord, while FC St. Pauli found themselves in the second-tier Regionalliga Nord. That year, the club signed Guy Acolatse, who became the first Black professional footballer to play in Germany.

Nearly a decade-and-a-half of frustration followed. St. Pauli won their division in 1964, but finished bottom of their group in the promotion play-off round. They won their next Regionalliga Nord title in 1966, but, while they performed far better in the play-offs, still could not advance to the top-flight, losing to Rot-Weiss Essen on goal difference, having conceded two more goals. Division championships in 1972 and 1973, and runner-up finishes in 1971 and 1974, were each followed by promotion-round play-off disappointment.

The success of the Bundesliga, and the growth of professional football in West Germany, led to the formation of the 2. Bundesliga in 1974. St. Pauli was part of the new second-tier professional circuit in the 2. Bundesliga Nord and, in 1977, they advanced to the top flight as winners of their division. The team survived for one season at the highest level in the Bundesliga.

The club's return to the 2. Bundesliga Nord was also short-lived. On the verge on bankruptcy in 1979, they were denied a license for the following season and were sent down to the Oberliga Nord (III). Strong performances that set the team atop that division in 1981 and 1983 were marred by poor financial health. By 1984, the club had recovered sufficiently to return to the 2. Bundesliga, overtaking Werder Bremen's amateur side, who, despite finishing two points ahead of St. Pauli, were ineligible for promotion.

=== "Kult" phenomenon ===
It was in the mid-1980s that St. Pauli's transition from a standard traditional club into a "Kult" club began. The club was also able to turn the location of its ground in the dock area part of town, near Hamburg's famous Reeperbahn — centre of the city's night life and its red-light district — to its advantage. An alternative fan scene slowly emerged, built around left-leaning politics, social activism and the event and party atmosphere of the club's matches. St. Pauli became the first team in Germany to officially ban right-wing nationalist activities and displays in its stadium during a period of fascist-inspired football hooliganism across Europe. In 1981, the team was averaging small crowds of only 1,600 spectators, but by the late 1990s they were frequently selling out their entire 20,000-capacity ground.

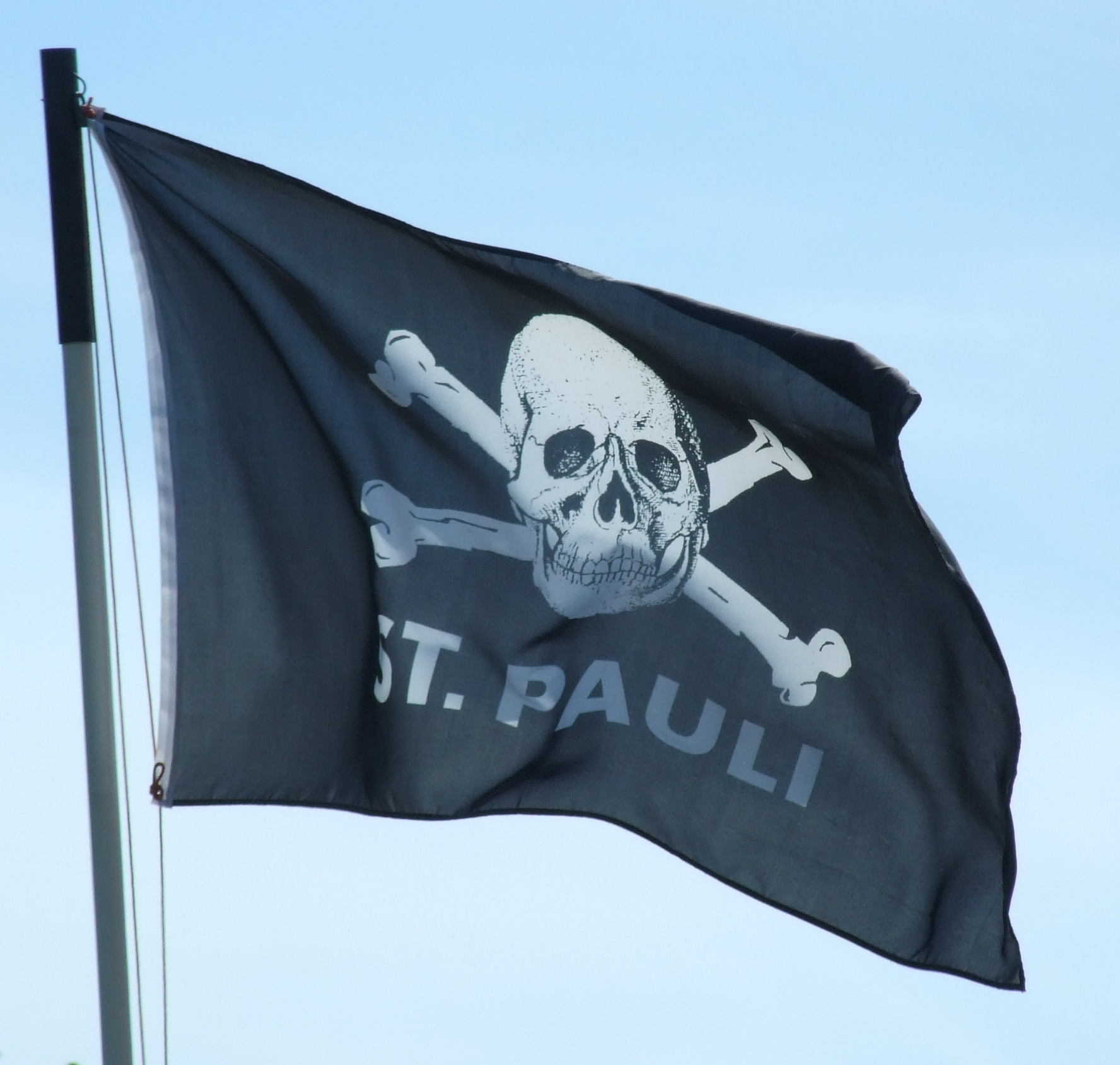
The club's official skull and crossbones symbol on a supporter flag

Supporters adopted the skull and crossbones as their own unofficial emblem in the 1980s. Although precise details are uncertain, the story goes that named "Doc Mabuse," a singer in a Hamburg punk band, nailed a Jolly Roger flag to a broomstick and brought it to the Millerntor-Stadion. The original flag featured a skull with pirate eyepatch. Inspired, other fans began to bring similar flags to matches. In 1989, Hamburg screenprinter Steph Braun created an image combining a detailed representation of a skull (taken from an anatomy textbook) with the words "ST. PAULI" underneath. Intended to represent the area itself, and sold in various record shops around the district, Braun's graphic was adopted by St. Pauli fans and came to be seen as specifically associated with the club.

In the early 1990s, the media in Germany began to recognize the Kult-image of the club, focusing on the punk part of the fan-base in TV broadcasts of the matches. By this time, the media also started to establish nicknames like "Freibeuter der Liga" ("Buccaneers of the League") as well as the satirical "das Freudenhaus der Liga" ("Brothel of the League", literally "House of Joy"). The club itself realized the potential and in September 1999 bought the rights to Steph Braun's skull and crossbones graphic, making it an official club logo.

St. Pauli moved in and out of the Bundesliga over the course of the next dozen years: the club was narrowly relegated to the Oberliga in the 1984–85 season, but won the 1985–86 championship and returned to 2. Bundesliga. Two increasingly strong years followed, resulting in promotion and three seasons in the Bundesliga, from 1988 to 1991. Four seasons followed in 2. Bundesliga, and then another two in the Bundesliga in 1995 to 1997, before another return to the 2. Bundesliga.

=== Into the new millennium ===
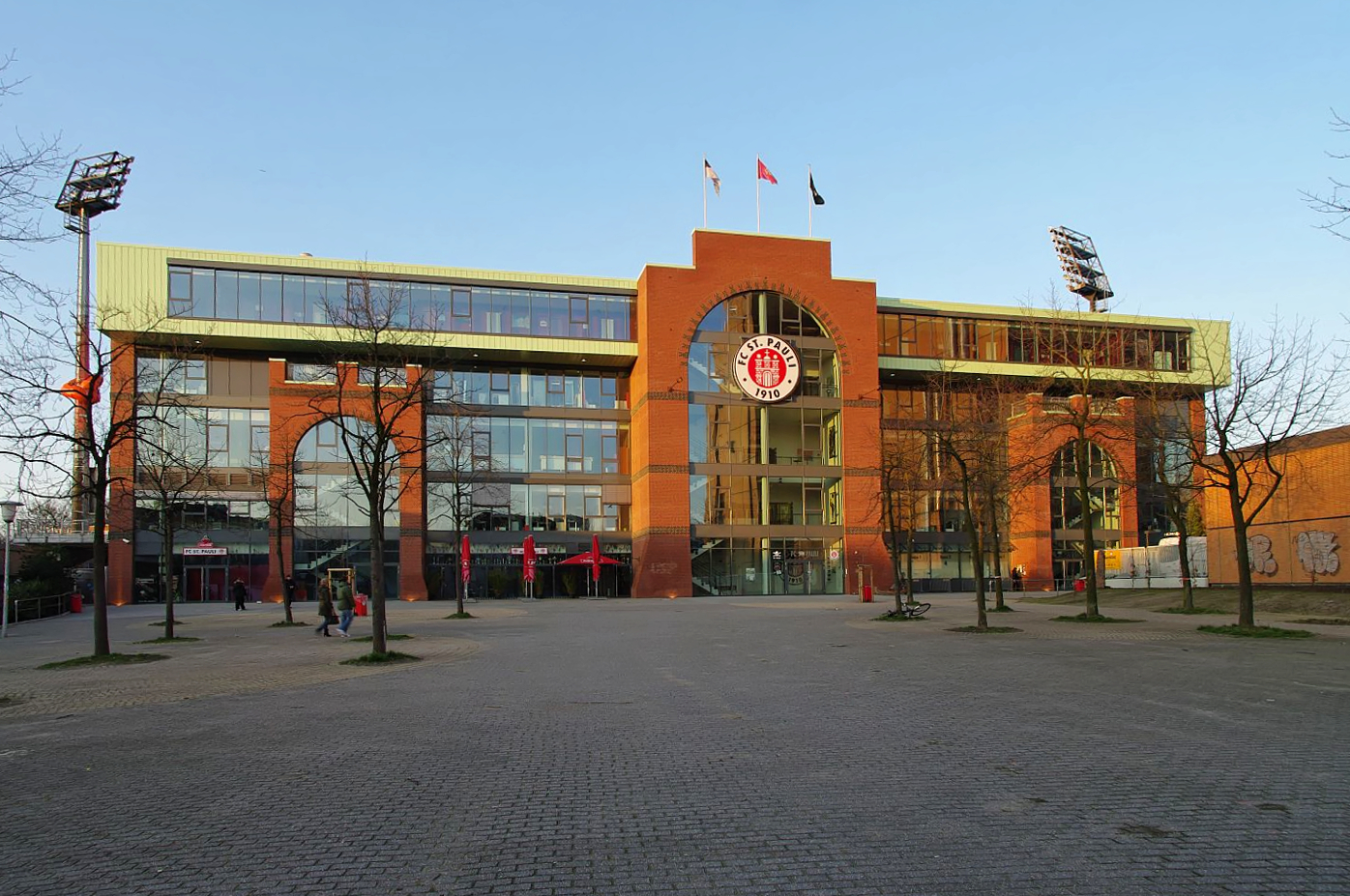
The new South Tribune of the Millerntor-Stadion, seen from Budapester Straße in 2009

Former logo

Until 2010, the club's most recent appearance in the top-flight had been a single-season cameo in 2001–02. A win against Bayern Munich, the reigning Intercontinental Cup winners, led to the popular "Weltpokalsiegerbesieger" ("World Club Champion beaters") shirts. However, the team finished last in the league, partly because the management did not trust the team which surprisingly won the promotion in 2001, but rather spent the additional money from Bundesliga TV contracts and advertisements on expensive but disappointing players. After the relegation to the 2. Bundesliga, only a skeleton of the successful 2001 team remained. The 2002–03 season ended up in chaos, with the team fighting relegation (ultimately in vain) from the very beginning, various coaches departing and other problems internal to the club.

With the club almost bankrupt again and the less-lucrative Regionaliga Nord (III) looming, the club began its fund-raising activities, the so-called "Retteraktion". They printed t-shirts with the club's crest surrounded by the word Retter ("rescuer/saviour") and more than 140,000 were sold within six weeks. They also organized a lucrative benefit game, against Bayern Munich, to raise funds to save the club.

The club has also been active in terms of charity and in 2005 the club, the team and the fans initiated the Viva con Agua de Sankt Pauli campaign, which collects money for water-dispensers for schools in Cuba, for clean water in Rwanda et cetera.

During the 2005–06 season, the team enjoyed unprecedented success in the DFB-Pokal, with wins over Burghausen, VfL Bochum and, significantly, Bundesliga sides Hertha BSC and, in the quarter-finals on 25 January 2006, Werder Bremen. Their 3–1 victory in front of a sell-out Millerntor crowd, and their subsequent place in the DFB Cup semi-final, netted the club approximately €1 million in TV and sponsorship money, going a long way to saving the club from immediate financial ruin.

St. Pauli finally went out of the cup to Bayern Munich on 12 April, going down 3–0 with a goal from Owen Hargreaves and two from Claudio Pizarro. Coincidentally, Bayern were also St. Pauli's opponents and dispatchers in the first round of the following season's cup.

After success in the 2006–07 season, the team was promoted to the 2. Bundesliga. After defeating SpVgg Greuther Fürth in the 2009–10 season, the team secured promotion back to the Bundesliga for the 2010–11 season. On 16 February 2011, during the 2010–11 season and for the first time since 1977, St. Pauli defeated their cross-city rivals, Hamburger SV, away at the Volksparkstadion, courtesy of a Gerald Asamoah goal. The team, however, finished the domestic season in last place, resulting in their relegation to the 2. Bundesliga for the 2011–12 season. Since then, the club remained in the 2. Bundesliga, finishing fourth in 2011–12 but declining in results in the years to come, until they earned promotion back to the Bundesliga in the 2023–24 season.

== Football Cooperative St. Pauli von 2024 eG ==
In order to be able to guarantee and expand financial security in professional football, the board and members of the club have decided in the End of 2024 to found the Football Cooperative St. Pauli von 2024 eG. The cooperative will enable fans and members to acquire shares for 750 euros plus a subscription and administration fee of 100 euros. The club is expecting 20,000 to 30,000 shareholders, which should raise up to 30 million euros, with the sale of shares to be discontinued once 36 million is reached. The co-operative will use these funds to acquire a majority stake in the Millerntor stadium operating company. The income is also needed to service existing loans, in particular from the new stadium construction and the coronavirus period. Members of the cooperative have co-determination rights according to the one man, one vote — principle and elect the Executive Board. The Football Cooperative St. Pauli von 2024 eG is the first cooperative in German professional football.

== Colours and kit ==
The colours of FC St. Pauli are brown and white, and to a lesser extent red. Black is also common among fans and on third kits.

The club has worn brown and white since 1910, when it joined the Northern German Football Association (Norddeutscher Fußball-Verband). These early uniforms were made up of brown shirts and socks with white shorts. Some time between the 1920s and 30s, the club took on what would become its traditional look, namely a white shirt, brown shorts and brown socks with a white turnover. From early on in the club's history until the 1990s, the club readily wore its brown change shirts at home, even during such games as those against rivals HSV, who also wear white shirts.

During the 1960s, the club introduced white socks which regularly alternated with plain brown socks. A motif was used on the club shirt for the first time in 1968, when the club donned stripes, and, in the 1970s, various other motifs adorned the club's first and second-choice shirts. In the 1976–77 season, St. Pauli began wearing Adidas kits, marking the end of a period of often experimental shirts, and this traditional look continued when the club started wearing Puma kits in the 1980s. For the 1985–86 season, the club sported an all-white Puma kit, which would be worn for four consecutive seasons before some brown details returned to the shirt. However, the Kiezkicker would continue to wear these predominantly white kits until 1993.

At this point, the club would return to a kit based on a white-brown-white scheme, but in a more contemporary style, often incorporating patterns. The Reusch kits of 1994–96 and 1996–97 had hoops and stripes respectively, while Kappa would also produce a striped kit in 2000–01. The Italian brand would provide a set of kits for the 2001–02 and 2002–03 seasons in which the shirt, shorts, and socks were all available in white and brown, meaning that the team would wear a different combination each game, reminiscent of the club's look between the 1960s and 1980s. During the 2001–02 season, the team would frequently make recourse to the previous year's all-black away kit.

In 2003–04, the club would once again sport a white shirt with brown sleeves, manufactured by Stanno. However this is, as of the 2022–23 season, the last time the club has donned its traditional kit. While the club's uniform for the 2005–06 season would combine a light shirt and brown shorts, St. Pauli would wear an all-black kit during the following campaign (marking the first time that neither of the club's colours were present on the home kit). From the 2007–08 season, St. Pauli has worn an all-brown home kit on all but three occasions, one of which saw the team return to a striped shirt, while in the two other instances the team wore white shorts.

Between 2019–20 and 2021–22, LGBT details were integrated into the third shirt. In 2020, having sought a kit supplier who would meet their ecological and ethical requirements since 2018, St. Pauli founded their own brand, Di!Y ("Do it. Improve Yourself"). From the 2021–22 season, St. Pauli have worn kits made in-house by Di!Y.

=== Sponsors ===
Period	Brand	Sponsor
1975–1976	Hummel	Lüder Bauring
1976–1977	Adidas	Lüder Bauring
1977–1978	Adidas	Minolta
1978–1979	Adidas	Lüder Bauring
1979–1980	Adidas	–
1980–1981	Puma	–
1981–1982	Puma	Block House
1982–1983	Puma	–
1983–1984	Puma	Klein-Kleckersdorf
1984–1991	Puma	Deutscher Ring
1991–1992	Diadora	Deutscher Ring
1992–1994	Patrick	Deutscher Ring
1994–1995	Reusch	Deutscher Ring
1995–1997	Reusch	Böklunder
1997–2000	Puma	Jack Daniels
2000–2001	Kappa	World of Internet/Astra
2001–2003	Kappa	Securvita
2003–2005	Stanno	Mobilcom
2005–2006	Do You Football	Mobilcom
2006–2009	Do You Football	Congstar
2009–2010	Do You Football	Dacia
2010–2013	Do You Football	Fernsehlotterie
2013–2014	Do You Football	Relentless
2014–2016	Hummel	Congstar
2016–2021	Under Armour	Congstar
2021–2024	Di!Y	Congstar
2024–	Puma	Congstar

== Stadium ==
The home venue of the FC St. Pauli is the Millerntor-Stadion. Work on the stadium began in 1961, but its completion was delayed until 1963 as there was initially no drainage system in place, making the pitch unplayable after rain. It originally held 32,000 supporters, but the capacity was later reduced for safety reasons.

In 1970, the stadium was renamed the Wilhelm Koch-Stadium in honour of a former club president. However, this name became highly controversial when it was discovered by historian René Martens that Wilhelm Koch had been a member of the Nazi Party from 1937 to 1945, as stated in his 1997 book "FC St. Pauli — You'll never walk alone." After protests by fans, the name was changed back to Millerntor-Stadion in 1999.

A total redevelopment began in 2006. The final phase of the redevelopment work ended with the completion of the new north stand in July 2015. The stadium is since then permitted for a capacity of 29,546 spectators of which 16,940 are standing and 12,606 are seated.

The stadium is located next to the Heiligengeistfeld, and is overlooked by the Flak Tower IV to the north and a building of the Deutsche Telekom to the south. It can be reached with the Hamburg U-Bahn line U3 (St. Pauli Station and Feldstraße Station).

== Club culture and supporters ==
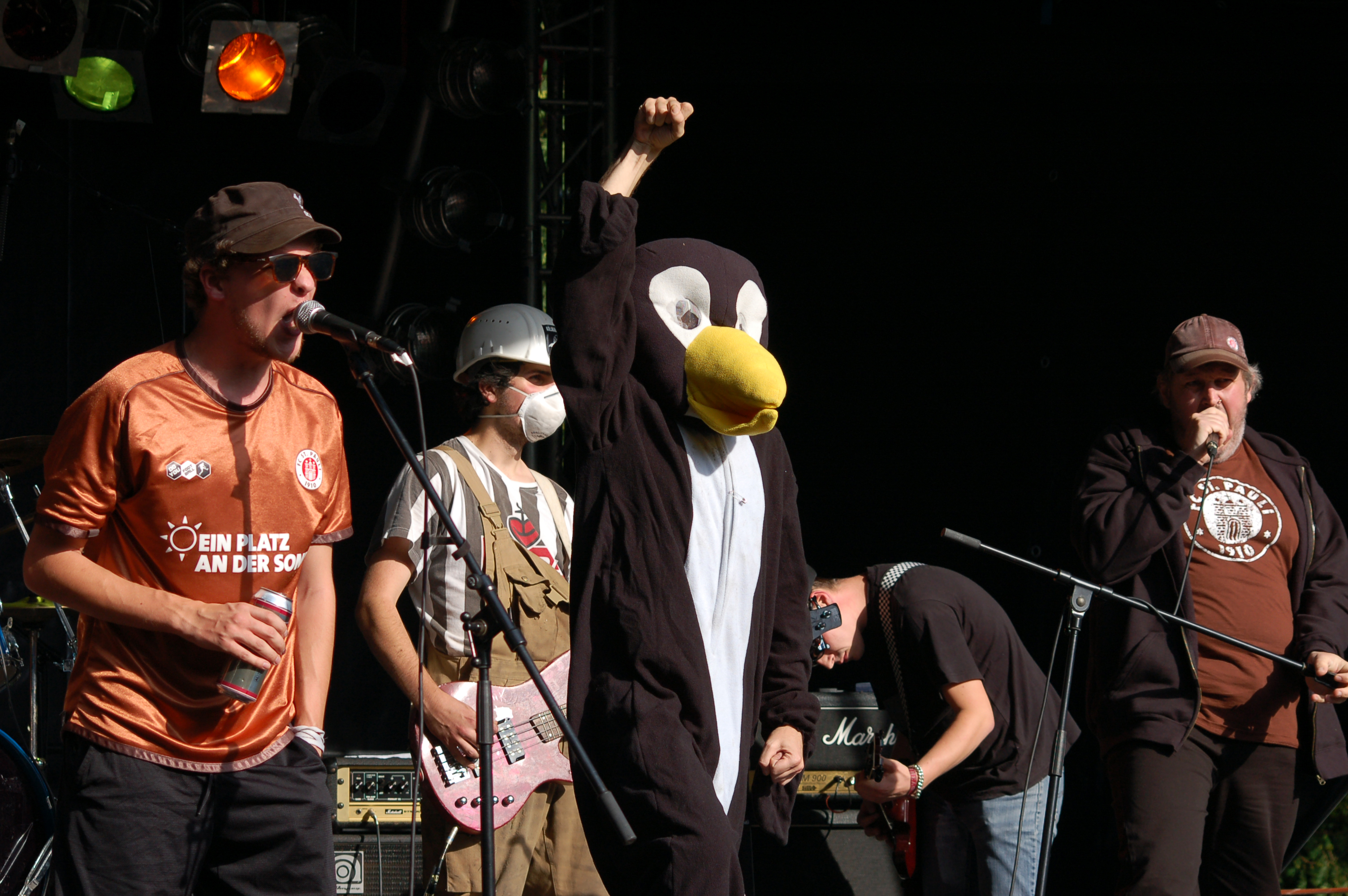
The ska punk group Kollmarlibre are avowed supporters of FC St. Pauli.

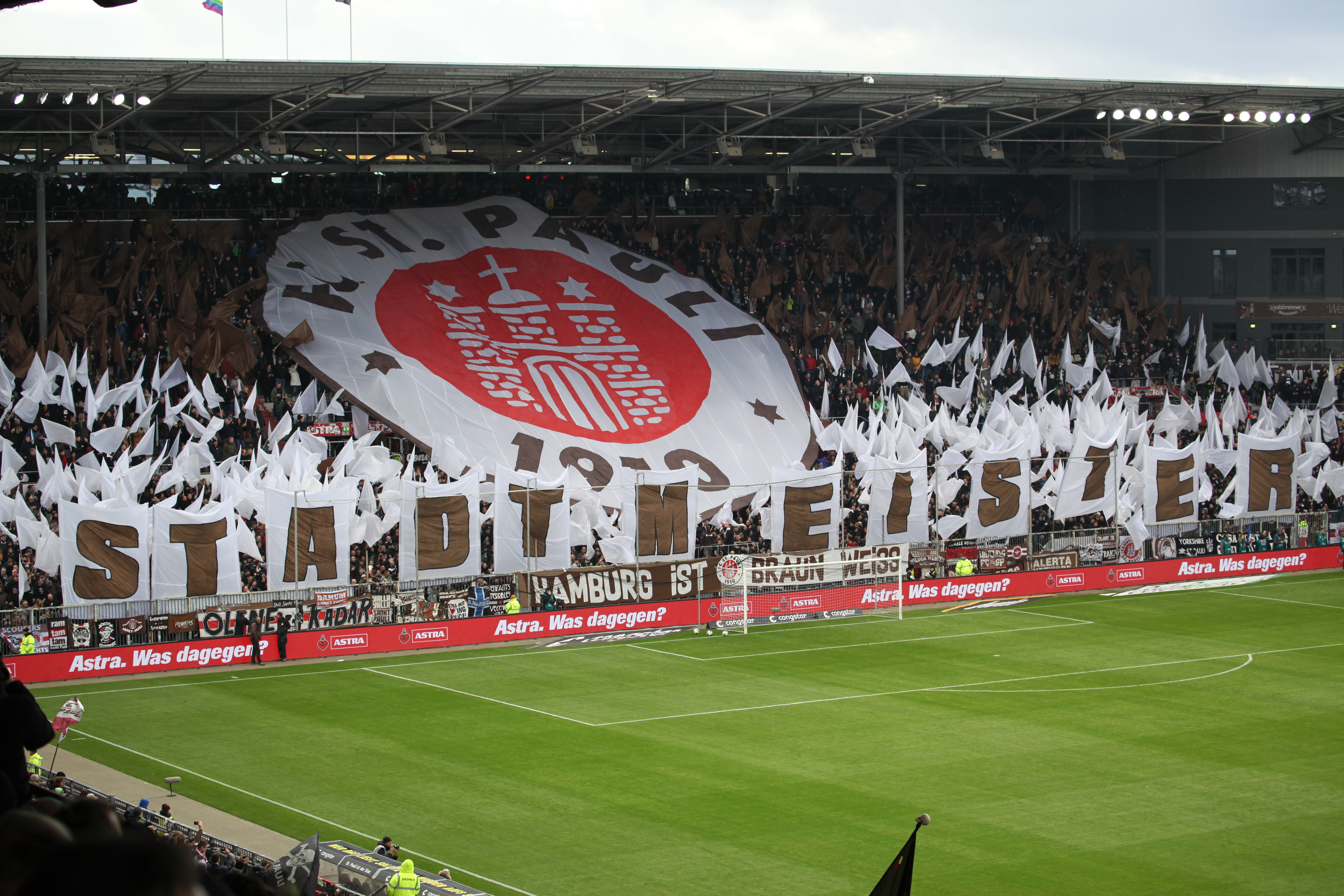
FC St. Pauli fans flying banners and hoisting tifos in 2020

FC St. Pauli is considered one of the most left-wing football clubs in the world, with a long-standing commitment to anti-fascism, anti-racism, anti-sexism, and LGBTQ+ rights. The club’s culture is closely linked to the St. Pauli district of Hamburg, an area historically associated with alternative lifestyles and the red-light district, the Reeperbahn. Its distinct political identity began to develop in the mid-1980s, when local residents, squatters, and left-wing activists rallied behind the team in response to a growing far-right presence among rival Hamburger SV supporters, establishing St. Pauli as a refuge for fans opposed to right-wing extremism in German football. The club operates under a democratic, member-driven structure, and its fans actively engage in political and social causes, including support for refugees, marginalised groups, and local community initiatives.

The skull and crossbones, or Jolly Roger, was adopted in the late 1980s after a local punk singer, Doc Mabuse, displayed the flag at a match. Originally a symbol of the club's underdog status, it became associated with St. Pauli's anti-establishment values. By the end of the 1980s, attendances at Millerntor Stadium increased significantly, aided by the club's promotion from the third division to the Bundesliga in 1988.

St. Pauli emphasises inclusivity and social responsibility, and these principles are central to both its operations and its fan culture. Fans frequently display banners opposing fascism, racism, homophobia, and sexism, while the club operates under a democratic, membership-driven structure that allows supporters to vote on major decisions. In 1989, St. Pauli fans staged a boycott that successfully blocked plans to integrate the stadium into a sports dome featuring a hotel and shopping centre, reinforcing the club’s commitment to prioritising social and political values over financial gain. Throughout the 1990s and 2000s, St. Pauli formalised its political commitments; on 28 October 1991, at the football club’s annual general meeting, the decision was made to ban neo-Nazis from the stadium and to make anti-fascism club policy. The club also promotes multicultural engagement and grassroots activism, supporting refugees, marginalised youth, and local squatter communities. It has hosted initiatives such as the FIFI Wild Cup, an alternative to the 2006 World Cup for nations not recognised by FIFA, and during the European refugee crisis of the mid-2010s, the club allowed refugees to stay overnight at the Millerntor Stadium and supported fundraising efforts for organisations assisting migrants in the Mediterranean. St. Pauli has also acted in response to fan protests over sexism. In 2002, advertisements for the men's magazine Maxim were removed from the Millerntor-Stadion due to their depictions of women. In 2011, the club banned lap dancers from performing for guests in a corporate suite belonging to a local lap dance club, following complaints from supporters. These actions, along with the club’s broader social and political initiatives, have contributed to the establishment of over 400 official supporter clubs worldwide.

The club's footballing performance has varied, including relegation to the third division in 2003 and near relegation in 2015. Despite this, the fanbase remains engaged, prioritising the club's social and cultural values over purely sporting success. During the 2010–2011 Bundesliga season, fans protested commercial practices that they felt compromised the club's identity, including VIP boxes and corporate sponsorships.

FC St. Pauli has been supported by both local and international musicians. Local contributors include Dave Doughman and his band Swearing at Motorists, who released the song St. Pauli 'til I die and established a music school at the Millerntor Stadium. Other international musicians seen supporting the club include Ed Sheeran, Blink 182, Fontaines D.C., Green Day, Bad Religion, and the Kaiser Chiefs. Songs linked to the club include AC/DC's Hells Bells and Blur's Song 2. In 2017, FC St. Pauli collaborated with the Boston-based punk band Dropkick Murphys on a limited release of a cover of the song You'll Never Walk Alone, and jointly designed a scarf and an exclusive T-shirt featuring the song title. The band has long been associated with St. Pauli and frequently visits the club's local pub, the Jolly Roger.

In February 2025, St. Pauli suspended the use of the song Das Herz von St. Pauli by fans after research revealed that its original creators, including Hans Albers, Michael Jary, and Josef Ollig, had ties to Nazi propaganda. The club emphasised that an anthem must unify fans, and the historical associations prevented this. Following publication of the findings and member discussions, no plans were made to reinstate the song, and alternative matchday music has been introduced to maintain fan engagement while addressing ethical concerns.

=== Friendships and rivalries ===
St. Pauli's politics and values have earned them admiration from other teams around the footballing world, such as Celtic FC and Bohemian FC. Celtic supporters, particularly segments like the Green Brigade, have developed a longstanding friendship with St. Pauli fans, rooted in shared left-wing and anti-fascist outlooks. Connections between the supporters date back to the 1990s, and there is mutual influence in chants, tifos, and political expression. Bohemian FC in Dublin has drawn inspiration from St Pauli's left‑wing stance, incorporating similar political values into its own club culture and community work, including anti‑racism, LGBT and refugee advocacy.

FC St. Pauli's primary rivals are Hamburger SV. Their meetings are known as the Hamburg derby or Stadtderby and are the most significant local fixture in the city. The rivalry stretches back over a century, with the two clubs first meeting in competitive fixtures in the early 20th century and maintaining a long history of encounters. HSV became Hamburg's larger, traditionally wealthier club with a long tenure in the Bundesliga and a more establishment profile, while St. Pauli developed in the port quarter with a distinct identity and supporter culture. The social contrast between the clubs adds to the derby's intensity; Hamburger SV's supporter base and institutional image have often been associated with more conventional sporting culture and, historically, a less politicised fan environment. In contrast to St. Pauli's politically engaged fan culture, HSV's terraces have at times been sites of right-wing fan presence, contributing to the ideological tensions that accompany the fixture. Head‑to‑head records show HSV with more wins across over 100 matches, but St. Pauli have taken notable victories that carry symbolic weight for their supporters. A prominent example was St. Pauli's 1–0 win at HSV's Volksparkstadion in February 2011, their first away derby win there in many years. Another intensification of the rivalry followed HSV's relegation to the 2. Bundesliga in 2018, increasing the frequency of derby matches. Matches attract heightened attention and occasionally elevated security measures because of the derby's atmosphere and local importance. Media coverage routinely highlights both the competitive stakes and the cultural symbolism of the fixture, reflecting deep civic loyalties across Hamburg and the broader social identities of each club's supporters.

FC St. Pauli has a rivalry with Hansa Rostock; when the two face off, it is known as the "Fear Derby". Hansa Rostock is associated with a region that has experienced a rise in right-wing extremism, particularly following the fall of East Germany. Matches between the two frequently involve violent confrontations, heavy police deployment, and disorder both inside and outside the stadium.

=== Fundamental Principles ===
St. Pauli were the first club in Germany to integrate a set of Fundamental Principles (Leitlinien) to dictate how the club is run, passed by an overwhelming majority at the club's annual general meeting in 2009.

The first five Principles states that:

1. In its totality, consisting of members, staff, fans and honorary officers, St Pauli FC is a part of the society by which it is surrounded and so is affected both directly and indirectly by social changes in the political, cultural and social spheres.
2. St Pauli FC is conscious of the social responsibility this implies, and represents the interests of its members, staff, fans and honorary officers in matters not just restricted to the sphere of sport.
3. St Pauli FC is the club of a particular city district, and it is to this that it owes its identity. This gives it a social and political responsibility in relation to the district and the people who live there.
4. St Pauli FC aims to put across a certain feeling for life and symbolises sporting authenticity. This makes it possible for people to identify with the club independently of any sporting successes it may achieve. Essential features of the club that encourage this sense of identification are to be honoured, promoted and preserved.
5. Tolerance and respect in mutual human relations are important pillars of the St Pauli philosophy.

== Players ==
=== Current squad ===
As of 27 August 2026

Note: Flags indicate national team as defined under FIFA eligibility rules; some limited exceptions apply. Players may hold more than one non-FIFA nationality.

No.	Pos.	Nation	Player
1	GK	GER	Ben Voll
2	DF	FIN	Rony Jansson
4	DF	AUT	David Nemeth (captain)
5	MF	ISL	Gísli Þórðarson (on loan from Lech Poznań)
6	DF	DEN	Marcus Mathisen
7	FW	GER	Youssoupha Niang (on loan from 1. FC Köln)
8	MF	SWE	Eric Smith
9	FW	GAM	Abdoulie Ceesay
10	FW	SWE	Branimir Hrgota
11	DF	POL	Arkadiusz Pyrka
14	MF	SWE	Erik Ahlstrand
15	DF	JPN	Tomoya Ando
16	MF	JPN	Joel Chima Fujita
17	MF	SCO	Scott Banks

No.	Pos.	Nation	Player
18	FW	JPN	Taichi Hara
19	FW	NED	Martijn Kaars
20	MF	NOR	Mathias Rasmussen
21	DF	GER	Lars Ritzka
22	MF	AUS	Sam Klein
23	DF	GER	Louis Oppie
24	MF	AUS	Connor Metcalfe
25	DF	POL	Adam Dźwigała
26	FW	JAM	Ricky-Jade Jones
28	MF	POR	Mathias Pereira Lage
30	GK	AUT	Simon Spari
33	GK	BUL	Dimitar Mitov
42	MF	GER	Marwin Schmitz
44	MF	JPN	Nick Schmidt

=== Out on loan ===
Note: Flags indicate national team as defined under FIFA eligibility rules; some limited exceptions apply. Players may hold more than one non-FIFA nationality.

No.	Pos.	Nation	Player
34	DF	AUT	Jannik Robatsch (at Beveren until 30 June 2027)

=== FC St. Pauli II ===
As of 8 September 2026

Note: Flags indicate national team as defined under FIFA eligibility rules; some limited exceptions apply. Players may hold more than one non-FIFA nationality.

No.	Pos.	Nation	Player
1	GK	GER	Niklas Petzsch
2	DF	GER	Luca Günther
4	DF	GER	Jannik Westphal
5	DF	GER	Joris Bente
6	DF	GER	Joel Addo
7	FW	GER	Haron Sabah
8	MF	GER	Mats Herrmann
9	FW	GER	Noah Palapies
10	MF	GER	Noah Gumpert
14	DF	GER	Sisco Ngambia Dzonga
15	DF	GER	Fynn Braun
17	FW	GBS	Mamadou Djalo
18	MF	AUS	Rawley St. John

No.	Pos.	Nation	Player
19	FW	GER	Jack Wardius
20	FW	GER	Wissou Kaba
21	DF	GER	Kenan Aydin
22	MF	GER	Abdul Alassani
23	DF	GER	Ammon Moser
24	DF	GER	Hendrik Wurr
27	MF	GER	Hugo Weber
29	MF	GER	Lucas Schulze
30	FW	NED	Nikky Goguadze
32	DF	GER	Anton Lange
40	GK	GER	Theo Moerchen
42	MF	GER	Marwin Schmitz
44	MF	JPN	Nick Schmidt

=== Out on loan ===
Note: Flags indicate national team as defined under FIFA eligibility rules; some limited exceptions apply. Players may hold more than one non-FIFA nationality.

No.	Pos.	Nation	Player
7	FW	GER	Romeo Aigbekaen (at Fortuna Köln until 30 June 2027)

=== Notable players ===
==== International players ====
The following international players have also played for St. Pauli:

- (Nigeria) Yakubu Adamu
- (Benin) Moudachirou Amadou
- (Germany) Gerald Asamoah
- (Bosnia and Herzegovina) Zlatan Bajramović
- (Turkey) Deniz Barış
- (Canada) Jonathan Beaulieu-Bourgault
- (Germany) Alfred Beck
- (Norway) Morten Berre
- (Morocco) Mourad Bounoua
- (United States) Paul Caligiuri
- (Panama) Armando Cooper
- (United States) Cory Gibbs
- (Cameroon) Marc Gouiffe à Goufan
- (Austria) Michael Gregoritsch
- (United States) Joe Gyau
- (Denmark) Heino Hansen
- (Finland) Ari Hjelm
- (Canada) Junior Hoilett
- (Turkey) Uğur İnceman
- (Australia) Jackson Irvine
- (Nigeria) Henry Isaac
- (Croatia) Ivan Klasnić
- (Croatia) Ante Budimir
- (Czechoslovakia) Ivo Knoflíček
- (Czechoslovakia) Ján Kocian
- (Germany) Max Kruse
- (Wales) James Lawrence
- (Iran) Alireza Mansourian
- (United States) Michael Mason
- (Haiti) Frantz Mathieu
- (Albania) Artur Maxhuni
- (Democratic Republic of the Congo) Michél Mazingu-Dinzey
- (Germany) Karl Miller
- (Japan) Ryo Miyaichi
- (Japan) Kazuo Ozaki
- (Norway) Tore Pedersen
- (Angola) Miguel Francisco Pereira
- (Haiti) Fafà Picault
- (Russia) Nikolai Pisarev
- (Ukraine) Andriy Polunin
- (Germany) Ingo Porges
- (Germany) Christian Rahn
- (Russia) Yuri Savichev
- (Germany) Helmut Schön
- (Lebanon) Feiz Shamsin
- (Curaçao) Rocky Siberie
- (Poland) Waldemar Sobota
- (Canada) Ive Sulentic
- (Ghana) Charles Takyi
- (Republic of the Congo) Jean-Clotaire Tsoumou-Madza
- (Denmark) Niels Tune-Hansen
- (Bosnia and Herzegovina) Nikola Vasilj
- (China) Yang Chen
- (Peru) Carlos Zambrano
- (Albania) Hysen Zmijani

==== Greatest ever team ====
In 2010, as part of the club's celebration of its 100th anniversary, fans voted the following players as the best in the club's history:

- (Germany) Klaus Thomforde
- (Germany) André Trulsen
- (Germany) Walter Frosch
- (Germany) Karl Miller
- (Germany) Dirk Dammann
- (Democratic Republic of the Congo) Michél Mazingu-Dinzey
- (Germany) Thomas Meggle
- (Germany) Jürgen Gronau
- (Germany) Harald Stender
- (Germany) Peter Osterhoff
- (Germany) Franz Gerber

== Coaching staff ==
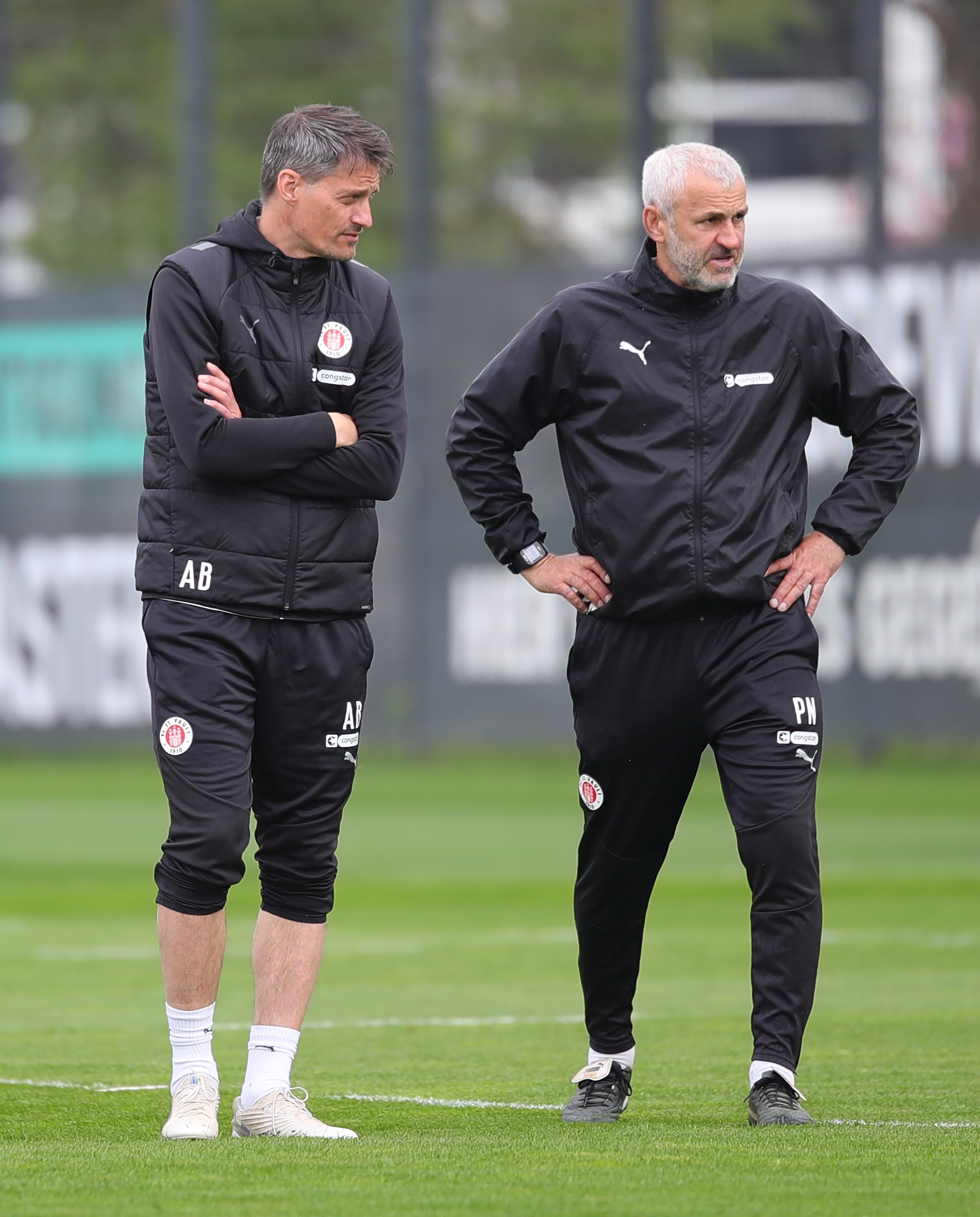
Former head coach Alexander Blessin (left) and assistant coach Peter Németh in 2025

Position	Name
Head coach	(Germany) Marcel Rapp
Assistant coach	(Slovakia) Peter Németh (Germany) Thomas Risch
Goalkeeper coach	(Belgium) Sven Van Der Jeugt
Managing director sport	(Germany) Andreas Bornemann
Performance manager	(New Zealand) Dr. James Morgan
Athletic trainer	(Germany) Thomas Barth (Germany) Karim Rashwan
Rehab coach	(Germany) Frederic Bokelmann
Team doctor	(Germany) Dr. Volker Carrero (Germany) Dr. Sebastian Schneider
Physiotherapists	(Germany) Jan Altmeyer (Germany) Dominik Körner (Germany) Marius Abraham
Video and game analyst	(Germany) Sami Pierau
Game and opponent analyst	(Germany) Niklas Lanwehr
Team manager	(Germany) Jonas Wömmel
Equipment manager	(Germany) Thorge Düwer (Japan) Kenta Kambara (Germany) Siegmar Krahl

=== Managerial history ===
As of 24 August 2025

- (Germany) Josef Müller (1937–38)
- (Germany) Richard Sump (1938–39)
- (Germany) Hans Sauerwein (1945–47)
- (Germany) Woldemar Gerschler (1948)
- (Germany) Fred Harthaus (1948–50)
- (Germany) Walter Risse (1950–52)
- (Germany) Hans Appel (1952)
- (Germany) Otto Westphal (1963–64)
- (Germany) Jockel Krause (1964–65)
- (Germany) Erwin Türk (1970–71)
- (Germany) Edgar Preuß (1971–72)
- (Germany) Karl-Heinz Mülhausen (1972–74)
- (Germany) Jockel Krause (1974–76)
- (Germany) Diethelm Ferner (1976–78)
- (Germany) Sepp Piontek (1978–79)
- (Germany) Werner Pokropp (1979)
- (Germany) Kuno Böge (1979–1982)
- (Germany) Michael Lorkowski (1982–86)
- (Germany) Willi Reimann (1986–87)
- (Germany) Helmut Schulte (1987–91)
- (Germany) Horst Wohlers (1991–92)
- (Germany) Josef Eichkorn (1992)
- (Germany) Michael Lorkowski (1992)
- (Germany) Josef Eichkorn (1992–94)
- (Germany) Uli Maslo (1994–97)
- (Germany) Klaus-Peter Nemet (1997)
- (Germany) Eckhard Krautzun (1997)
- (Germany) Gerhard Kleppinger (1997–99)
- (Germany) Willi Reimann (1999–00)
- (Germany) Dietmar Demuth (2000–02)
- (Germany) Joachim Philipkowski (2002)
- (Germany) Franz Gerber (2002–04)
- (Germany) Andreas Bergmann (2004–06)
- (Germany) Holger Stanislawski (2006–07)
- (Germany) André Trulsen (2007–08)
- (Germany) Holger Stanislawski (2008–11)
- (Germany) André Schubert (2011–12)
- (Germany) Michael Frontzeck (2012–13)
- (Germany) Roland Vrabec (2013–14)
- (Germany) Thomas Meggle (2014)
- (Germany) Ewald Lienen (2014–2017)
- (Germany) Olaf Janßen (2017)
- (Germany) Markus Kauczinski (2017–19)
- (Netherlands) Jos Luhukay (2019–20)
- (Germany) Timo Schultz (2020–22)
- (Germany) Fabian Hürzeler (2022–24)
- (Germany) Alexander Blessin (2024–)

== Honours ==
=== League ===
- 2. Bundesliga (II)
  - Champions: 1976–77 (Nord), 2023–24
  - Runners-up : 1987–88, 1994–95, 2009–10
- Regionalliga Nord (II)
  - Champions : 1963–64, 1965–66, 1971–72, 1972–73
- Regionalliga Nord (III)
  - Champions : 2007
- Oberliga Nord (III)
  - Champions : 1981, 1983, 1986
- Stadtliga Hamburg (I)
  - Champions : 1947

=== Cup ===
- Hamburger Pokal
  - Winners: 1986, 1998, 2001, 2004, 2005, 2006, 2008

=== Reserve team ===
- Oberliga Hamburg/Schleswig-Holstein (IV)
  - Champions: 1995, 1999, 2003
- Oberliga Hamburg (V)
  - Champions: 2011
- Hamburger Pokal
  - Winners: 1998, 2001, 2008, 2009, 2010

== Records ==
Note: FC St. Pauli did not play in the Bundesliga or the 2. Bundesliga until 1974, 1979–1984, 1985–86 and 2003–2007.
Statistics are correct as of 22 June 2022.

=== Most appearances overall ===
BL = Bundesliga, 2.BL = 2. Bundesliga, OLN = Oberliga Nord (1947–1963), RLN = Regionalliga Nord (1963–1974)
OtL = Other leagues: Oberliga Nord (1974–1994), Regionalliga Nord (since 1994)
Cup = DFB-Pokal, OtC = Other competitions: German championship (1947–1951), Relegation play-offs, Hamburg Cup

Rank	Name	First	Last	BL	2.BL	OLN	RLN	OtL	Cup	OtC	Total
1	(Germany) Jürgen Gronau	1981	1997	117	202	–	–	112	21	24	476
2	(Germany) André Trulsen	1986	2005	177	206	–	–	1	20	5	409
3	(Germany) Klaus Thomforde	1983	1998	100	217	–	–	42	17	13	389
4	(Germany) Harald Stender	1947	1960	–	–	336	–	–	5	15	356
5	(Germany) Ingo Porges	1956	1968	–	–	166	147	–	3	12	328
6	(Germany) Peter Osterhoff	1958	1970	–	–	138	170	–	3	9	320
7	(Germany) Werner Pokropp	1960	1970	–	–	78	223	–	3	11	315
8	(Germany) André Golke	1983	1991	98	107	–	–	62	10	16	293
9	(Germany) Fabian Boll	2003	2014	28	141	–	–	103	19	1	292
10	(Germany) Michael Dahms	1982	1991	65	97	–	–	97	8	22	289

=== Most appearances in Bundesliga and 2. Bundesliga ===
Rank	Name	Years	Bundesliga	2. Liga	Total
1	(Germany) André Trulsen	1986–1991, 1994–2002	177	206	383
2	(Germany) Jürgen Gronau	1984–1997	117	202	319
3	(Germany) Klaus Thomforde	1984–2000	100	217	317
4	(Germany) Dirk Dammann	1990–1999	81	179	260
5	(Germany) Holger Stanislawski	1993–2003	80	178	258
6	(Germany) Dietmar Demuth	1974–1979, 1984–1988	34	192	226
7	(Germany) André Golke	1984–1991	98	107	205
8	(Germany) Daniel Buballa	2014–2021	–	191	191
9	(Germany) Christopher Buchtmann	2012–2022	–	190	190
10	(Germany) Stephan Hanke	1994–2000	61	119	180

=== Top goalscorers in Bundesliga and 2. Bundesliga ===
Numbers in brackets indicate appearances made.

Rank	Name	Years	Bundesliga	2. Liga	Total	Ratio
1	(Germany) Rüdiger Wenzel	1974–1975, 1984–1990	4 (27)	59 (137)	63 (164)	0.38
2	(Germany) Franz Gerber	1976–1978, 1986–1988	16 (32)	42 (73)	58 (105)	0.55
3	(Germany) Dirk Zander	1986–1991	20 (80)	31 (90)	51 (170)	0.30
4	(Germany) André Golke	1984–1991	25 (98)	24 (107)	49 (205)	0.24
5	(Germany) Marius Ebbers	2008–2013	3 (31)	43 (107)	46 (138)	0.33
6	(Germany) Marcus Marin	1994, 1997–2000	–	40 (102)	40 (102)	0.39
7	(Germany) Martin Driller	1991–1997	10 (49)	29 (103)	39 (152)	0.26
8	(Germany) Horst Neumann	1974–1979	3 (25)	33 (132)	36 (157)	0.23
9	(Germany) Jens Scharping	1993–1998	12 (46)	20 (55)	32 (101)	0.32
10	(Germany) Rolf Höfert	1974–1979	3 (23)	28 (118)	31 (141)	0.22

== Recent seasons ==
The club's recent seasons:

Year	Division	Position
1999–2000	2. Bundesliga (II)	13th
2000–01	2. Bundesliga	3rd (promoted)
2001–02	Bundesliga (I)	18th (relegated)
2002–03	2. Bundesliga (II)	17th (relegated)
2003–04	Regionalliga Nord (III)	8th
2004–05	Regionalliga Nord	7th
2005–06	Regionalliga Nord	6th
2006–07	Regionalliga Nord	1st (promoted)
2007–08	2. Bundesliga (II)	9th
2008–09	2. Bundesliga	8th
2009–10	2. Bundesliga	2nd (promoted)
2010–11	Bundesliga	18th (relegated)
2011–12	2. Bundesliga	4th
2012–13	2. Bundesliga	10th
2013–14	2. Bundesliga	8th
2014–15	2. Bundesliga	15th
2015–16	2. Bundesliga	4th
2016–17	2. Bundesliga	7th
2017–18	2. Bundesliga	12th
2018–19	2. Bundesliga	9th
2019–20	2. Bundesliga	14th
2020–21	2. Bundesliga	10th
2021–22	2. Bundesliga	5th
2022–23	2. Bundesliga	5th
2023–24	2. Bundesliga	1st (promoted)
2024–25	Bundesliga	14th
2025–26	Bundesliga	18th (relegated)
2026–27	2. Bundesliga	

== Other sports ==
The St. Pauli rugby section has several teams, both in the men's and women's leagues.

The men's rugby department has not been as successful as its female counterpart, reaching the German final only once, in 1964. In 2008–09, St. Pauli was the only club to have a team in both the rugby and football 2nd Bundesliga. In 2008–09, the men's team finished fourth in the second division.

The women's team have won the German rugby union championship eight times (1995, 2000, 2001, 2003, 2005–08) and the sevens championship 3 times (2000, 2001 and 2002). Several of their players play in the national squad.

St. Pauli has a blind football team which plays in the Blindenfussball Bundesliga.

St. Pauli also has a Roller Derby team known as Harbor Girls Hamburg.

The club's chess section competes in the German Chess Bundesliga. In 2024, the section landed a coup when they were able to recruit five-time World Champion Magnus Carlsen to play in Bundesliga matches for them. Carlsen made his debut for St. Pauli on 11 January 2025.

== Notable presidents ==
- 1990–00: Heinz Weisener
- 2002–10: Corny Littmann

== See also ==
- Hamburg derby
