= 2026–27 FC Schalke 04 season =

Schalke 04
2026–27 season
- CEO: Matthias Tillmann
- Head coach: Miron Muslić
- Stadium: Veltins-Arena
- Bundesliga: 17th
- DFB-Pokal: Second round
- Top goalscorer: League: Adil Aouchiche; Adrian Gantenbein; Robin Gosens; Maximilian Wöber; Junior Adamu (1 each); All: Edin Džeko; Junior Adamu (2 each)
- Highest home attendance: 62,250 vs Mainz 05, 17 October 2026, Bundesliga
- Lowest home attendance: 61,554 vs SV Elversberg, 20 September 2026, Bundesliga
- Average home league attendance: 61,870
- Biggest win: 5–2 vs Hallescher FC (A), 24 August 2026, DFB-Pokal
- Biggest defeat: 0–3 vs FC Augsburg (A), 30 August 2026, Bundesliga
Home colours	Away colours	Third colours
- All statistics correct as of 29 October 2026.

The 2026–27 FC Schalke 04 season is their 123rd season in the football club's history and first consecutive and 55th overall season in the top flight of German football, the Bundesliga, having been promoted from the 2. Bundesliga in 2026. In addition to the domestic league, Schalke will also participate in this season's edition of the domestic cup, the DFB-Pokal. This is the 26th season for Schalke in the Veltins-Arena, located in Gelsenkirchen, North Rhine-Westphalia.

== Players ==
Note: Players' appearances and goals only in their Schalke career.

As of 22 November 2026

No.	Player	Nat	Pos	Age	Contract		Signed from	League		Total	
No.	Player	Nat	Pos	Age	began	ends	Signed from	Apps	Goals	Apps	Goals
Goalkeepers
1	Loris Karius	(Germany)	GK	33	Jan 2025	Jun 2028	Free agent	44	0	47	0
22	Kevin Müller	(Germany)	GK	35	Jan 2026	Jun 2027	1. FC Heidenheim	5	0	5	0
36	Johannes Siebeking	(Germany)	GK	20	Jul 2025	Jun 2029	Schalke 04 U19	0	0	0	0
Defenders
4	Hasan Kuruçay	(Turkey)	CB	29	Jul 2025	Jun 2027	(Belgium) OH Leuven	40	4	44	4
5	Timo Becker (vc)	(Germany)	CB	29	Jul 2025	Jun 2029	Holstein Kiel	69	0	76	0
8	Robin Gosens	(Germany)	LB/LM	32	Jul 2026	Jun 2027	(Italy) Fiorentina	8	1	9	1
17	Adrian Gantenbein	(Switzerland)	RB	25	Jul 2024	Jun 2028	(Switzerland) Winterthur	41	2	43	2
25	Nikola Katić	(Bosnia and Herzegovina)	CB	30	Jul 2025	Jun 2028	(Switzerland) Zürich	36	1	40	1
29	Junior Dina Ebimbe	(Cameroon)	RB/RM	26	Aug 2026	Jun 2028	Eintracht Frankfurt	9	0	11	0
33	Vitalie Becker	(Germany)	LB	21	Jul 2024	Jun 2030	Schalke 04 U19	29	2	32	2
39	Maximilian Wöber	(Austria)	CB	28	Jul 2026	Jun 2027	(England) Leeds United	6	1	6	1
43	Mertcan Ayhan	(Turkey)	CB	20	Jul 2025	Jun 2030	Schalke 04 U19	32	0	36	0
Midfielders
6	Ron Schallenberg	(Germany)	DM	28	Jul 2023	Jun 2027	SC Paderborn	93	3	98	3
13	Satoshi Tanaka	(Japan)	DM	24	Jul 2026	Jun 2030	Fortuna Düsseldorf	9	0	11	0
14	Janik Bachmann	(Germany)	CM/DM	30	Jul 2024	Jun 2027	Hansa Rostock	50	3	54	3
21	Dejan Ljubičić	(Austria)	CM/RM	29	Jan 2026	Jun 2028	(Croatia) Dinamo Zagreb	21	4	23	5
23	Soufiane El-Faouzi	(Morocco)	CM	24	Jul 2025	Jun 2030	Alemannia Aachen	43	2	46	2
24	Adil Aouchiche	(Algeria)	AM	24	Feb 2026	Jun 2030	(England) Sunderland	24	4	26	4
27	Finn Porath	(Germany)	RM/AM	29	Aug 2025	Jun 2027	Holstein Kiel	18	1	19	1
38	Luca Vozar	(Germany)	DM/CM	19	Jul 2026	Jun 2029	Schalke 04 U19	1	0	2	0
Forwards
7	Hee-chan Hwang	(South Korea)	ST	30	Sep 2026	Jun 2027	(England) Wolverhampton	8	0	9	0
9	Moussa Sylla	(Mali)	ST	26	Jul 2024	Jun 2028	(France) Pau	62	23	66	24
10	Edin Džeko	(Bosnia and Herzegovina)	ST	40	Jan 2026	Jun 2027	(Italy) Fiorentina	19	6	21	8
11	Bryan Lasme	(France)	ST	28	Jul 2023	Jun 2027	Arminia Bielefeld	46	6	49	7
15	Emil Højlund	(Denmark)	ST	21	Jul 2024	Jun 2028	(Denmark) Copenhagen	14	0	15	0
19	Kenan Karaman (c)	(Turkey)	ST/AM	32	Sep 2022	Jun 2028	(Turkey) Beşiktaş	119	41	127	43
20	Junior Adamu	(Austria)	ST	25	Jul 2026	Jun 2029	SC Freiburg	8	1	10	2

== Transfers ==
=== In ===
Player	Nat	Pos	From	Type	Transfer fee	Date	Ref
Junior Adamu	(Austria)	FW	(Germany) SC Freiburg	Transfer	€800,000	1 Jul 2026	
Satoshi Tanaka	(Japan)	MF	(Germany) Fortuna Düsseldorf	Transfer	€1,000,000	1 Jul 2026	
Ilyes Hamache	(France)	FW	(France) Amiens	Loan return	—	1 Jul 2026	
Steve Noode	(Cameroon)	DF	(Luxembourg) Union Titus Pétange	Loan return	—	1 Jul 2026	
Martin Wasinski	(Belgium)	DF	(Belgium) RFC Liège	Loan return	—	1 Jul 2026	
Mauro Zalazar	(Uruguay)	MF	(Portugal) Braga	Loan return	—	1 Jul 2026	
Mika Wallentowitz	(Germany)	MF	(Germany) Schalke 04 U19	Promoted	—	1 Jul 2026	
Luca Vozar	(Germany)	MF	(Germany) Schalke 04 U19	Promoted	—	8 Jul 2026	
Kevin Müller	(Germany)	GK	(Germany) 1. FC Heidenheim	Transfer (after loan)	€50,000	8 Jul 2026	
Robin Gosens	(Germany)	DF	(Italy) Fiorentina	Loan	—	17 Jul 2026	
Maximilian Wöber	(Austria)	DF	(England) Leeds United	Transfer	Free	22 Jul 2026	
Junior Dina Ebimbe	(Cameroon)	DF	(Germany) Eintracht Frankfurt	Transfer	€800,000	7 Aug 2026	
Hee-chan Hwang	(South Korea)	FW	(England) Wolverhampton	Loan	—	1 Sep 2026	

=== Out ===
Player	Nat	Pos	To	Type	Transfer fee	Date	Ref
Ilyes Hamache	(France)	FW	(Netherlands) Cambuur	Transfer	€200,000	1 Jul 2026	
Christopher Antwi-Adjei	(Ghana)	MF	Free agent	End of contract	—	1 Jul 2026	
Henning Matriciani	(Germany)	DF	Free agent	End of contract	—	1 Jul 2026	
Peter Remmert	(Germany)	FW	(Germany) MSV Duisburg	Loan	—	1 Jul 2026	
Moussa N'Diaye	(Senegal)	DF	(Belgium) Anderlecht	Loan return	—	1 Jul 2026	
Tomáš Kalas	(Czech Republic)	DF	(Germany) Schalke 04 II	Demoted	—	5 Jul 2026	
Steve Noode	(Cameroon)	DF	(Germany) Schalke 04 II	Demoted	—	5 Jul 2026	
Felipe Sánchez	(Argentina)	DF	(Mexico) Santos Laguna	Loan	—	5 Jul 2026	
Luca Podlech	(Germany)	GK	(Norway) Aalesund	Loan	—	14 Jul 2026	
Mika Wallentowitz	(Germany)	MF	(Germany) Greuther Fürth	Loan	—	24 Jul 2026	
Zaid Tchibara	(Togo)	FW	(Germany) Schalke 04 II	Demoted	—	29 Jul 2026	
Anton Donkor	(Germany)	DF	(Germany) Schalke 04 II	Demoted	—	4 Aug 2026	
Max Grüger	(Germany)	MF	(Germany) Schalke 04 II	Demoted	—	4 Aug 2026	
Mauro Zalazar	(Uruguay)	MF	(Croatia) Kustošija	Transfer	Free	7 Aug 2026	
Martin Wasinski	(Belgium)	DF	(Netherlands) Almere City	Loan	—	25 Aug 2026	
Dylan Leonard	(Australia)	DF	(Germany) Alemannia Aachen	Loan	—	1 Sep 2026	
Christian Gomis	(Senegal)	FW	(Spain) Tenerife	Loan	—	1 Sep 2026	

=== New contracts ===
Player	Nat	Pos	Contract until	Date	Ref
Loris Karius	(Germany)	GK	Jun 2028	9 Jun 2026	
Soufiane El-Faouzi	(Morocco)	MF	Jun 2030	3 Jul 2026	
Mertcan Ayhan	(Turkey)	DF	Jun 2030	29 Jul 2026	
Edin Džeko	(Bosnia and Herzegovina)	FW	Jun 2027	3 Aug 2026	
Vitalie Becker	(Germany)	DF	Jun 2030	18 Aug 2026	
Adil Aouchiche	(Algeria)	MF	Jun 2030	1 Sep 2026	
Luca Vozar	(Germany)	MF	Jun 2029	17 Sep 2026	

== Friendly matches ==
Win Draw Loss

11 July 2026 1	FC Gütersloh	2–1	Schalke 04	Gütersloh
14:00 CEST (UTC+2)	Langfeld 45+3'; Maiella 74'	Report	Aouchiche 90+2'	Stadium: Heidewaldstadion; Attendance: 4,259; Referee: Henry Schröder

19 July 2026 2	Erzgebirge Aue	2–4	Schalke 04	Aue
14:00 CEST (UTC+2)	Bär 62'; Ramadan 71'	Report	Sylla 28', 45+2'; Gomis 51'; Lasme 54'	Stadium: Erzgebirgsstadion; Attendance: 12,438; Referee: Jens Klemm

22 July 2026 3	Schalke 04	2–0	FC Kharkiv	Kematen, Austria
16:00 CEST (UTC+2)	Tanaka (yellow card) 41'; Sylla 54'; Lasme 64'; Kuruçay (yellow card) 73'	Report	Pavlyuk (yellow card) 20'; Profini (yellow card) 39'; Kalyuzhnyi (yellow card) 73'	Stadium: Sportplatz Kematen; Attendance: 2,000; Referee: Daniel Pfister

25 July 2026 4	Schalke 04	3–1	Fagiano Okayama	Schwaz, Austria
16:00 CEST (UTC+2)	Kuruçay 19'; Karaman 28' (pen.); Adamu 75'	Report	Gaúcho 13'	Stadium: Silberstadt-Arena; Attendance: 2,520; Referee: Ali Mutlu

1 August 2026 5	Hessen Kassel	0–5	Schalke 04	Kassel
14:00 CEST (UTC+2)		Report	Karaman 36'; Adamu 40'; El-Faouzi (yellow card) 45'; Aouchiche 59'; Sylla 63'; Tanaka 74'	Stadium: Auestadion; Attendance: 18,737; Referee: Tim Waldinger

8 August 2026 6	Schalke 04	0–3	Atalanta	Gelsenkirchen
17:00 CEST (UTC+2)		Report	Scamacca 30'; Samardžić 40'; Zalewski (yellow card) 71'; Scalvini (yellow card) 80'; Krstović 87'	Stadium: Veltins-Arena; Attendance: 58,587; Referee: Sören Storks

16 August 2026 7	Schalke 04	0–3	Real Madrid	Gelsenkirchen
17:00 CEST (UTC+2)		Report	Mbappé 6', (yellow card) 40'; Huijsen 20'; Espí 57'; Camavinga (yellow card) 71'	Stadium: Veltins-Arena; Attendance: 62,136; Referee: Sören Storks

24 September 2026 8	Rot-Weiß Oberhausen	2–5	Schalke 04	Oberhausen
19:00 CEST (UTC+2)	Kesim 4', 18'	Report	Schallenberg 41'; Sylla 53', 62', 65', 72'	Stadium: Niederrheinstadion; Attendance: 6,520; Referee: Kristijan Rajkovski

3 October 2026 9	Austria Lustenau	0–1	Schalke 04	Lustenau, Austria
15:00 CEST (UTC+2)		Report	Sylla 66'	Stadium: Sun Minimeal Arena; Attendance: 5,138; Referee: Felix Ouschan

== Competitions ==
=== Overview ===
Competition	First match	Last match	Starting round	Final position	Record							
Competition	First match	Last match	Starting round	Final position	Pld	W	D	L	GF	GA	GD	Win %
Bundesliga	30 August 2026	22 May 2027	Matchday 1	TBD	10	1	4	5	5	11	−6	10.00
DFB-Pokal	24 August 2026	28 October 2026	First round	Second round	2	1	0	1	5	4	+1	50.00
Total					12	2	4	6	10	15	−5	16.67

Source: Soccerway

=== Bundesliga ===
==== League table ====
Pos	Team	Pld	W	D	L	GF	GA	GD	Pts	Qualification or relegation
14	1. FC Köln	10	2	4	4	11	15	−4	10	
15	SC Paderborn	10	2	4	4	8	15	−7	10	
16	Schalke 04	10	1	4	5	5	11	−6	7	Qualification for the relegation play-offs
17	Union Berlin	10	1	4	5	8	26	−18	7	Relegation to 2. Bundesliga
18	Borussia Mönchengladbach	10	1	1	8	12	26	−14	4	Relegation to 2. Bundesliga

Updated to match(es) played on 22 November 2026. Source: Bundesliga
Rules for classification: 1) Points; 2) Goal difference; 3) Goals scored; 4) Head-to-head aggregate results; 5) Head-to-head away goals scored; 6) Away goals scored; 7) Play-off at neutral site.
(Rules 4–6 only apply after all home-and-away matches have been played between the tied teams. Rule 7 only applies after the completion of the season.)

==== Results summary ====
Overall								Home						Away					
Pld	W	D	L	GF	GA	GD	Pts	W	D	L	GF	GA	GD	W	D	L	GF	GA	GD
10	1	4	5	5	11	−6	7	0	3	2	0	3	−3	1	1	3	5	8	−3

Last updated: 22 November 2026.
Source: Soccerway

==== Results by round ====
Round	1	2	3	4	5	6	7	8	9	10	11	12	13	14	15	16	17	18	19	20	21	22	23	24	25	26	27	28	29	30	31	32	33	34
Ground	A	H	A	H	A	H	A	H	A	H	A	H	A	H	A	H	A	H	A	H	A	H	A	H	A	H	A	H	A	H	A	H	A	H
Result	L	D	W	D	L	L	D	L	L	D																								
Position	16	14	11	11	13	15	16	17	17	16																								
Points	0	1	4	5	5	5	6	6	6	7																								

Updated to match(es) played on 21 November 2026. Source: Bundesliga official website
A = Away; H = Home; W = Win; D = Draw; L = Loss

==== Matches ====
The league fixtures were released on 2 July 2026.

30 August 2026 1	FC Augsburg	3–0	Schalke 04	Augsburg
17:30 CEST (UTC+2)	Gregoritsch 18'; Rieder (yellow card) 22'; Kade 79'; Ribeiro 90+2'	Report	Schallenberg (red card) 62'	Stadium: Augsburg Arena; Attendance: 30,660; Referee: Sascha Stegemann

5 September 2026 2	Schalke 04	0–0	Bayern Munich	Gelsenkirchen
18:30 CEST (UTC+2)	Ebimbe (yellow card) 31'; Katić (yellow card) 73'	Report	Upamecano (yellow card) 35'; Pavlović (yellow card) 72'	Stadium: Veltins-Arena; Attendance: 62,094; Referee: Robert Schröder

11 September 2026 3	Union Berlin	1–3	Schalke 04	Berlin
20:30 CEST (UTC+2)	Kemlein (yellow card) 45'; Ljubičić (yellow card) 74'; Uduokhai (yellow card) 78'; Skarke 90+6'	Report	Gosens 25'; Aouchiche 46'; Karius (yellow card) 90+9'; Wöber 90+13'	Stadium: Stadion An der Alten Försterei; Attendance: 20,012; Referee: Timo Gerach

20 September 2026 4	Schalke 04	0–0	SV Elversberg	Gelsenkirchen
17:30 CEST (UTC+2)	Kuruçay (yellow card) 62'	Report	Keidel (yellow card) 26'; Darvich (yellow card) 36'	Stadium: Veltins-Arena; Attendance: 61,554; Referee: Robin Braun

11 October 2026 5	SC Freiburg	2–1	Schalke 04	Freiburg
17:30 CEST (UTC+2)	Eggestein 10'; Suzuki (yellow card) 49' (yellow-red card) 64'; Ginter (yellow card) 58'; Gotō 85'	Report	Gantenbein 30'; Hwang Hee-chan (yellow card) 87'	Stadium: Europa-Park Stadion; Attendance: 34,700; Referee: Martin Petersen

17 October 2026 6	Schalke 04	0–1	Mainz 05	Gelsenkirchen
15:30 CEST (UTC+2)		Report	Tietz 24'; Amiri (yellow card) 42'; Sano (yellow card) 45'	Stadium: Veltins-Arena; Attendance: 62,250; Referee: Richard Hempel

24 October 2026 7	1. FC Köln	0–0	Schalke 04	Cologne
15:30 CEST (UTC+2)	Krauß (yellow card) 45+2'; Lochoshvili (yellow card) 81'	Report	Ebimbe (yellow card) 71'; Becker (yellow card) 83'; Kuruçay (yellow card) 89'	Stadium: RheinEnergieStadion; Attendance: 50,000; Referee: Harm Osmers

31 October 2026 8	Schalke 04	0–2	RB Leipzig	Gelsenkirchen
15:30 CET (UTC+1)	T. Becker (yellow card) 51'; Aouchiche (yellow card) 86'	Report	Nusa 37' (pen.); Cardoso 78'	Stadium: Veltins-Arena; Attendance: 61,581; Referee: Max Burda

8 November 2026 9	TSG Hoffenheim	2–1	Schalke 04	Sinsheim
19:30 CET (UTC+1)	Asllani 10'; Lemperle 26'	Report	Hwang Hee-chan (yellow card) 75'; Adamu 81'; Aouchiche (yellow card) 90+10'	Stadium: Rhein-Neckar-Arena; Attendance: 28,000; Referee: Tobias Stieler

21 November 2026 10	Schalke 04	v	VfB Stuttgart	Gelsenkirchen
18:30 CET (UTC+1)		Report		Stadium: Veltins-Arena; Referee: Daniel Siebert

28 November 2026 11	SC Paderborn	v	Schalke 04	Paderborn
15:30 CET (UTC+1)		Report		Stadium: Home Deluxe Arena

6 December 2026 12	Schalke 04	v	Borussia Dortmund	Gelsenkirchen
15:30 CET (UTC+1)		Report		Stadium: Veltins-Arena

11 December 2026 13	Hamburger SV	v	Schalke 04	Hamburg
20:30 CET (UTC+1)		Report		Stadium: Volksparkstadion

20 December 2026 14	Schalke 04	v	Borussia Mönchengladbach	Gelsenkirchen
19:30 CET (UTC+1)		Report		Stadium: Veltins-Arena

9 January 2027 15	Eintracht Frankfurt	v	Schalke 04	Frankfurt
15:30 CET (UTC+1)		Report		Stadium: Deutsche Bank Park

14 January 2027 16	Schalke 04	v	Werder Bremen	Gelsenkirchen
20:30 CET (UTC+1)		Report		Stadium: Veltins-Arena

17 January 2027 17	Bayer Leverkusen	v	Schalke 04	Leverkusen
17:30 CET (UTC+1)		Report		Stadium: BayArena

23 January 2027 18	Schalke 04	v	FC Augsburg	Gelsenkirchen
15:30 CET (UTC+1)		Report		Stadium: Veltins-Arena

29–31 January 2027 19	Bayern Munich	v	Schalke 04	Munich
		Report		Stadium: Allianz Arena

5–7 February 2027 20	Schalke 04	v	Union Berlin	Gelsenkirchen
		Report		Stadium: Veltins-Arena

12–14 February 2027 21	SV Elversberg	v	Schalke 04	Spiesen-Elversberg
		Report		Stadium: Waldstadion an der Kaiserlinde

19–21 February 2027 22	Schalke 04	v	SC Freiburg	Gelsenkirchen
		Report		Stadium: Veltins-Arena

26–28 February 2027 23	Mainz 05	v	Schalke 04	Mainz
		Report		Stadium: Mewa Arena

2–4 March 2027 24	Schalke 04	v	1. FC Köln	Gelsenkirchen
		Report		Stadium: Veltins-Arena

5–7 March 2027 25	RB Leipzig	v	Schalke 04	Leipzig
		Report		Stadium: Red Bull Arena

12–14 March 2027 26	Schalke 04	v	TSG Hoffenheim	Gelsenkirchen
		Report		Stadium: Veltins-Arena

19–21 March 2027 27	VfB Stuttgart	v	Schalke 04	Stuttgart
		Report		Stadium: MHPArena

2–4 April 2027 28	Schalke 04	v	SC Paderborn	Gelsenkirchen
		Report		Stadium: Veltins-Arena

9–11 April 2027 29	Borussia Dortmund	v	Schalke 04	Dortmund
		Report		Stadium: Signal Iduna Park

16–18 April 2027 30	Schalke 04	v	Hamburger SV	Gelsenkirchen
		Report		Stadium: Veltins-Arena

23–25 April 2027 31	Borussia Mönchengladbach	v	Schalke 04	Mönchengladbach
		Report		Stadium: Borussia-Park

7–9 May 2027 32	Schalke 04	v	Eintracht Frankfurt	Gelsenkirchen
		Report		Stadium: Veltins-Arena

14–16 May 2027 33	Werder Bremen	v	Schalke 04	Bremen
		Report		Stadium: Weserstadion

22 May 2027 34	Schalke 04	v	Bayer Leverkusen	Gelsenkirchen
15:30 CEST (UTC+2)		Report		Stadium: Veltins-Arena

=== DFB-Pokal ===
24 August 2026 1R	Hallescher FC	2–5 (a.e.t.)	Schalke 04	Halle
20:45 CEST (UTC+2)	Kastull 45'; L. Becker (yellow card) 48'; Landgraf (yellow card) 54'; Benyamina (yellow card) 71'; Ratifo (yellow card) 75'; Stierlin 90+1'	Report	Т. Becker (yellow card) 13'; Ljubičić 62'; Džeko 81' (pen.), 117'; Ayhan (yellow card) 88'; Sylla 98'; Adamu 105+1'	Stadium: Leuna-Chemie-Stadion; Attendance: 14,000; Referee: Matthias Jöllenbeck

28 October 2026 2R	Dynamo Dresden	2–0	Schalke 04	Dresden
18:00 CET (UTC+1)	Čović 53', (yellow card) 60'; Rapp (yellow card) 87'; Daferner 88'	Report	Džeko (yellow card) 37'; Hwang Hee-chan (yellow card) 44'; Aouchiche (yellow card) 60'; Katić (yellow card) 87'; Karius (yellow card) 88'; Tanaka (yellow card) 90+3'	Stadium: Rudolf-Harbig-Stadion; Attendance: 30,600; Referee: Wolfgang Haslberger

== Statistics ==
As of 22 November 2026

=== Squad statistics ===
A = Appearances, S = Starts, G = Goals, (yellow card) = yellow cards, (red card) = red cards

No.	Player	Nat	Pos	Bundesliga					DFB-Pokal					Total				
No.	Player	Nat	Pos	A	S	G	Yellow card	Red card	A	S	G	Yellow card	Red card	A	S	G	Yellow card	Red card
Goalkeepers
1	Loris Karius	(Germany)	GK	10	10	0	1	0	2	2	0	1	0	12	12	0	2	0
22	Kevin Müller	(Germany)	GK	1	0	0	0	0	0	0	0	0	0	1	0	0	0	0
Defenders
4	Hasan Kuruçay	(Turkey)	DF	10	10	0	2	0	2	2	0	0	0	12	12	0	2	0
5	Timo Becker	(Germany)	DF	8	7	0	1	0	2	1	0	1	0	10	8	0	2	0
8	Robin Gosens	(Germany)	DF	8	7	1	0	0	1	0	0	0	0	9	7	1	0	0
17	Adrian Gantenbein	(Switzerland)	DF	2	2	1	0	0	0	0	0	0	0	2	2	1	0	0
25	Nikola Katić	(Bosnia and Herzegovina)	DF	10	10	0	1	0	2	2	0	1	0	12	12	0	2	0
29	Junior Dina Ebimbe	(Cameroon)	DF	9	4	0	2	0	2	2	0	0	0	11	6	0	2	0
33	Vitalie Becker	(Germany)	DF	8	3	0	1	0	2	2	0	0	0	10	5	0	1	0
39	Maximilian Wöber	(Austria)	DF	6	1	1	0	0	0	0	0	0	0	6	1	1	0	0
43	Mertcan Ayhan	(Turkey)	DF	5	2	0	0	0	2	1	0	1	0	7	3	0	1	0
Midfielders
6	Ron Schallenberg	(Germany)	MF	3	1	0	0	1	1	1	0	0	0	4	2	0	0	1
13	Satoshi Tanaka	(Japan)	MF	9	8	0	0	0	2	1	0	1	0	11	9	0	1	0
14	Janik Bachmann	(Germany)	MF	2	0	0	0	0	0	0	0	0	0	2	0	0	0	0
21	Dejan Ljubičić	(Austria)	MF	6	5	0	0	0	2	1	1	0	0	8	6	1	0	0
23	Soufiane El-Faouzi	(Morocco)	MF	9	9	0	0	0	1	1	0	0	0	10	10	0	0	0
24	Adil Aouchiche	(Algeria)	MF	10	9	1	2	0	2	2	0	1	0	12	11	1	3	0
38	Luca Vozar	(Germany)	MF	1	0	0	0	0	1	1	0	0	0	2	1	0	0	0
Forwards
7	Hee-chan Hwang	(South Korea)	FW	8	4	0	2	0	1	1	0	1	0	9	5	0	3	0
9	Moussa Sylla	(Mali)	FW	5	3	0	0	0	1	1	1	0	0	6	4	1	0	0
10	Edin Džeko	(Bosnia and Herzegovina)	FW	8	2	0	0	0	2	1	2	1	0	10	3	2	1	0
11	Bryan Lasme	(France)	FW	1	0	0	0	0	0	0	0	0	0	1	0	0	0	0
19	Kenan Karaman	(Turkey)	FW	8	7	0	0	0	1	0	0	0	0	9	7	0	0	0
20	Junior Adamu	(Austria)	FW	8	6	1	0	0	2	0	1	0	0	10	6	2	0	0
Total				10		5	12	1	2		5	8	0	12		10	20	1

=== Goalscorers ===
Rank	Player	Nat	Pos	Bundesliga	DFB-Pokal	Total
1	Junior Adamu	(Austria)	FW	1	1	2
1	Edin Džeko	(Bosnia and Herzegovina)	FW	0	2	2
2	Adil Aouchiche	(Algeria)	MF	1	0	1
2	Adrian Gantenbein	(Switzerland)	DF	1	0	1
2	Robin Gosens	(Germany)	DF	1	0	1
2	Dejan Ljubičić	(Austria)	MF	0	1	1
2	Moussa Sylla	(Mali)	FW	0	1	1
2	Maximilian Wöber	(Austria)	DF	1	0	1
Total				5	5	10

=== Assists ===
Rank	Player	Nat	Pos	Bundesliga	DFB-Pokal	Total
1	Edin Džeko	(Bosnia and Herzegovina)	FW	1	1	2
1	Moussa Sylla	(Mali)	FW	0	2	2
2	Junior Adamu	(Austria)	FW	1	0	1
2	Adil Aouchiche	(Algeria)	MF	0	1	1
2	Robin Gosens	(Germany)	DF	0	1	1
2	Hee-chan Hwang	(South Korea)	FW	1	0	1
Total				3	5	8

=== Clean sheets ===
Rank	Player	Nat	Bundesliga	DFB-Pokal	Total
1	Loris Karius	(Germany)	4	0	4
