= 2025–26 FC Schalke 04 season =

Schalke 04
2025–26 season
- CEO: Matthias Tillmann
- Head coach: Miron Muslić
- Stadium: Veltins-Arena
- 2. Bundesliga: 1st (promoted)
- DFB-Pokal: Second round
- Top goalscorer: Kenan Karaman (14)
- Average home league attendance: 61,829
- Biggest win: 0–3 v H96 (A); 2.Bundesliga, 17 October 2025
- Biggest defeat: 4–0 v SVD (A); DFB-Pokal, 29 October 2025
Home colours	Away colours	Third colours

The 2025–26 FC Schalke 04 season was their 122nd season in the football club's history, and their ninth overall and third consecutive season in the second flight of German football, the 2. Bundesliga. In addition to the domestic league, Schalke also participated in this season's edition of the domestic cup, the DFB-Pokal. This was the 25th season for Schalke in the Veltins-Arena, located in Gelsenkirchen, North Rhine-Westphalia.

== Players ==
Note: Players' appearances and goals only in their Schalke career.

As of end of 2025–26 season

No.	Player	Nat	Pos	Age	Contract		Signed from	League		Total	
No.	Player	Nat	Pos	Age	began	ends	Signed from	Apps	Goals	Apps	Goals
Goalkeepers
1	Loris Karius	(Germany)	GK	33	Jan 2025	Jun 2027	Free agent	34	0	35	0
22	Kevin Müller	(Germany)	GK	35	Jan 2026	Jun 2026	1. FC Heidenheim	4	0	4	0
32	Luca Podlech	(Germany)	GK	21	Jul 2024	Jun 2028	Schalke 04 U19	0	0	0	0
36	Johannes Siebeking	(Germany)	GK	20	Jul 2025	Jun 2029	Schalke 04 U19	0	0	0	0
Defenders
2	Felipe Sánchez	(Argentina)	CB	22	Jul 2024	Jun 2028	(Argentina) Gimnasia LP	30	0	34	0
3	Dylan Leonard	(Australia)	CB	18	Sep 2025	Jun 2030	(Australia) Western United	2	0	2	0
4	Hasan Kuruçay	(Turkey)	CB	28	Jul 2025	Jun 2027	(Belgium) OH Leuven	30	4	32	4
5	Timo Becker	(Germany)	CB	29	Jul 2025	Jun 2029	Holstein Kiel	61	0	66	0
16	Moussa N'Diaye	(Senegal)	LB	24	Feb 2026	Jun 2026	(Belgium) Anderlecht	14	0	14	0
17	Adrian Gantenbein	(Switzerland)	RB	25	Jul 2024	Jun 2028	(Switzerland) Winterthur	39	1	41	1
25	Nikola Katić	(Bosnia and Herzegovina)	CB	29	Jul 2025	Jun 2028	(Switzerland) Zürich	26	1	28	1
26	Tomáš Kalas	(Czech Republic)	CB	33	Aug 2023	Jun 2027	(England) Bristol City	48	2	50	2
30	Anton Donkor	(Germany)	LB	28	Jul 2024	Jun 2027	Eintracht Braunschweig	28	0	31	0
33	Vitalie Becker	(Germany)	LB	21	Jul 2024	Jun 2027	Schalke 04 U19	21	2	22	2
41	Henning Matriciani	(Germany)	RB	26	Sep 2021	Jun 2026	Schalke 04 II	61	0	64	0
43	Mertcan Ayhan	(Turkey)	CB	19	Jul 2025	Jun 2028	Schalke 04 U19	27	0	29	0
Midfielders
6	Ron Schallenberg	(Germany)	DM	27	Jul 2023	Jun 2027	SC Paderborn	90	3	94	3
14	Janik Bachmann	(Germany)	CM/DM	30	Jul 2024	Jun 2027	Hansa Rostock	48	3	52	3
18	Christopher Antwi-Adjei	(Ghana)	LM/LW	32	Aug 2024	Jun 2026	VfL Bochum	34	2	35	2
21	Dejan Ljubičić	(Austria)	CM	28	Jan 2026	Jun 2028	(Croatia) Dinamo Zagreb	15	4	15	4
23	Soufiane El-Faouzi	(Morocco)	CM	23	Jul 2025	Jun 2029	Alemannia Aachen	34	2	36	2
24	Adil Aouchiche	(Algeria)	AM	23	Feb 2026	Jun 2027	(England) Sunderland	14	3	14	3
27	Finn Porath	(Germany)	RM/AM	29	Aug 2025	Jun 2027	Holstein Kiel	18	1	19	1
37	Max Grüger	(Germany)	CM/DM	21	Jul 2024	Jun 2028	Schalke 04 U19	27	1	30	1
Forwards
7	Christian Gomis	(Senegal)	ST	25	Sep 2025	Jun 2029	(Switzerland) Winterthur	19	1	19	1
9	Moussa Sylla	(Mali)	ST	26	Jul 2024	Jun 2028	(France) Pau	57	23	60	23
10	Edin Džeko	(Bosnia and Herzegovina)	ST	40	Jan 2026	Jun 2026	(Italy) Fiorentina	11	6	11	6
11	Bryan Lasme	(France)	ST	27	Jul 2023	Jun 2027	Arminia Bielefeld	45	6	48	7
15	Emil Højlund	(Denmark)	ST	21	Jul 2024	Jun 2028	(Denmark) Copenhagen	14	0	15	0
19	Kenan Karaman (captain)	(Turkey)	ST/AM	32	Sep 2022	Jun 2028	(Turkey) Beşiktaş	111	41	118	43
39	Peter Remmert	(Germany)	ST	20	Jul 2024	Jun 2028	VfL Osnabrück U19	5	0	6	0
47	Zaid Tchibara	(Togo)	ST	20	Jul 2025	Jun 2028	Schalke 04 U19	3	0	3	0

== Transfers ==
=== In ===
Player	Nat	Pos	From	Type	Transfer fee	Date	Ref
Nikola Katić	(Bosnia and Herzegovina)	DF	(Switzerland) Zürich	Transfer	€450,000	1 Jul 2025	
Soufiane El-Faouzi	(Morocco)	MF	(Germany) Alemannia Aachen	Transfer	€200,000	1 Jul 2025	
Timo Becker	(Germany)	DF	(Germany) Holstein Kiel	End of contract	—	1 Jul 2025	
Johannes Siebeking	(Germany)	GK	(Germany) Schalke 04 U19	Promoted	—	1 Jul 2025	
Zaid Tchibara	(Togo)	FW	(Germany) Schalke 04 U19	Promoted	—	1 Jul 2025	
Emmanuel Gyamfi	(Germany)	MF	(Netherlands) VVV-Venlo	Loan return	—	1 Jul 2025	
Bryan Lasme	(France)	FW	(Switzerland) Grasshopper	Loan return	—	1 Jul 2025	
Henning Matriciani	(Germany)	DF	(Germany) Waldhof Mannheim	Loan return	—	1 Jul 2025	
Steve Noode	(Cameroon)	DF	(Austria) SCR Altach	Loan return	—	1 Jul 2025	
Paul Pöpperl	(Germany)	MF	(Germany) Viktoria Köln	Loan return	—	1 Jul 2025	
Martin Wasinski	(Belgium)	DF	(Belgium) Genk	Loan return	—	1 Jul 2025	
Mertcan Ayhan	(Turkey)	DF	(Germany) Schalke 04 U19	Promoted	—	21 Jul 2025	
Hasan Kuruçay	(Turkey)	DF	(Belgium) OH Leuven	End of contract	—	29 Jul 2025	
Finn Porath	(Germany)	MF	(Germany) Holstein Kiel	Transfer	€500,000	21 Aug 2025	
Christian Gomis	(Senegal)	FW	(Switzerland) Winterthur	Transfer	€1,500,000	1 Sep 2025	
Dylan Leonard	(Australia)	DF	(Australia) Western United	End of contract	—	15 Sep 2025	
Kevin Müller	(Germany)	GK	(Germany) 1. FC Heidenheim	Loan	—	20 Jan 2026	
Edin Džeko	(Bosnia and Herzegovina)	FW	(Italy) Fiorentina	Transfer	Free	22 Jan 2026	
Dejan Ljubičić	(Austria)	MF	(Croatia) Dinamo Zagreb	Transfer	€750,000	27 Jan 2026	
Jakob Sachse	(Germany)	FW	(Germany) Schalke 04 II	Promoted	—	2 Feb 2026	
Adil Aouchiche	(Algeria)	MF	(England) Sunderland	Transfer	Free	2 Feb 2026	
Moussa N'Diaye	(Senegal)	DF	(Belgium) Anderlecht	Loan	—	2 Feb 2026	

=== Out ===
Player	Nat	Pos	To	Type	Transfer fee	Date	Ref
Derry Murkin	(England)	DF	(Netherlands) Utrecht	Transfer	€1,200,000	1 Jul 2025	
Paul Seguin	(Germany)	MF	(Germany) Hertha BSC	Transfer	€400,000	1 Jul 2025	
Lino Tempelmann	(Germany)	MF	(Germany) Eintracht Braunschweig	Transfer	€300,000	1 Jul 2025	
Emmanuel Gyamfi	(Germany)	MF	(Scotland) Aberdeen	Transfer	€250,000	1 Jul 2025	
Ron-Thorben Hoffmann	(Germany)	GK	(Germany) Eintracht Braunschweig	Transfer	€200,000	1 Jul 2025	
Mehmet-Can Aydın	(Turkey)	MF	(Germany) Eintracht Braunschweig	End of contract	—	1 Jul 2025	
Aymen Barkok	(Morocco)	MF	Free agent	End of contract	—	1 Jul 2025	
Dominick Drexler	(Germany)	MF	Retired	End of contract	—	1 Jul 2025	
Ralf Fährmann	(Germany)	GK	Retired	End of contract	—	1 Jul 2025	
Marcin Kamiński	(Poland)	DF	(Poland) Wisła Płock	End of contract	—	1 Jul 2025	
Michael Langer	(Austria)	GK	Retired	End of contract	—	1 Jul 2025	
Tobias Mohr	(Germany)	MF	(Belgium) Standard Liège	End of contract	—	1 Jul 2025	
Arış Bayındır	(Germany)	MF	(Germany) Schalke 04 II	Demoted	—	1 Jul 2025	
Paul Pöpperl	(Germany)	MF	(Germany) Schalke 04 II	Demoted	—	1 Jul 2025	
Steve Noode	(Cameroon)	DF	(Luxembourg) Union Titus Pétange	Loan	—	24 Jul 2025	
Taylan Bulut	(Germany)	DF	(Turkey) Beşiktaş	Transfer	€6,000,000	16 Aug 2025	
Ilyes Hamache	(France)	FW	(France) Amiens	Loan	—	1 Sep 2025	
Martin Wasinski	(Belgium)	DF	(Belgium) RFC Liège	Loan	—	2 Sep 2025	
Pape Meïssa Ba	(Senegal)	FW	(Poland) Widzew Łódź	Transfer	Free	5 Sep 2025	
Ibrahima Cissé	(Mali)	DF	(Switzerland) Aarau	Transfer	Free	2 Jan 2026	
Justin Heekeren	(Germany)	GK	(Belgium) Anderlecht	Transfer	€500,000	20 Jan 2026	
Mauro Zalazar	(Uruguay)	MF	(Portugal) Braga	Loan	—	2 Feb 2026	
Jakob Sachse	(Germany)	FW	(Germany) Viktoria Köln	Loan	—	2 Feb 2026	
Amin Younes	(Germany)	MF	Free agent	Released	—	18 Feb 2026	

=== New contracts ===
Player	Nat	Pos	Contract until	Date	Ref
Loris Karius	(Germany)	GK	Jun 2027	11 Jun 2025	
Ron Schallenberg	(Germany)	MF	Jun 2027	22 Feb 2026	

== Friendly matches ==
Win Draw Loss

28 June 2025 1	„Best of Grafschaft“	1–9	Schalke 04	Nordhorn
16:00 CEST (UTC+2)	Vrye 85'	Report	Ba 24', 43'; Younes 26'; Matriciani 30'; T. Becker 47'; Remmert 59'; Donkor 79'; Zalazar 83'; Potnar 89'	Stadium: Sportpark Blanke; Attendance: 6,000; Referee: Jost Steenken

5 July 2025 2	1. FC Bocholt	2–3	Schalke 04	Bocholt
17:00 CEST (UTC+2)	Budimbu 99' (pen.); Hanke 110'	Report	Gulasi 60+2'; Remmert 81'; Hamache 115' (pen.)	Stadium: Stadion am Hünting; Attendance: 4,999; Referee: Marten Kaufels
Note: The match lasted 2 x 60 minutes.

9 July 2025 3	Schalke 04	0–0	Panathinaikos	Schwaz, Austria
18:00 CEST (UTC+2)		Report		Stadium: Silberstadt-Arena; Attendance: 1,000; Referee: Samuel Sampl

12 July 2025 4	Schalke 04	2–3	Wehen Wiesbaden	Neustift, Austria
11:00 CEST (UTC+2)	Remmert 71', 87'	Report	Kaya 7', 10'; Kalem 52'	Stadium: Training ground Attendance: 800; Referee: Alexander Pale

12 July 2025 5	Schalke 04	1–0	St. Gallen	Imst, Austria
15:00 CEST (UTC+2)	Sylla 32'	Report		Stadium: Velly Arena; Attendance: 1,100; Referee: Stefan Macanovic

19 July 2025 6	Schalke 04	0–0	Twente	Gelsenkirchen
14:00 CEST (UTC+2)				Stadium: Parkstadion; Attendance: 4,999; Referee: Robert Kampka

20 July 2025 7	Rot Weiss Ahlen	0–3	Schalke 04	Ahlen
14:00 CEST (UTC+2)		Report	Sánchez 8'; Remmert 20'; Grüger 50'	Stadium: Wersestadion; Attendance: 4,612; Referee: Hendrik Rottkord

26 July 2025 8	Schalke 04	2–4	Sevilla	Gelsenkirchen
17:00 CEST (UTC+2)	Sylla 59' (pen.); Zalazar 84'	Report	Adams 4', 32'; Iheanacho 66'; Marcão 86'	Stadium: Veltins-Arena; Attendance: 45,774; Referee: Timo Gansloweit

5 September 2025 9	Borussia Mönchengladbach	2–0	Schalke 04	Mönchengladbach
15:00 CEST (UTC+2)	Netz 6'; Honorat 53'	Report		Stadium: Fohlenplatz; Attendance: 1,800; Referee: Robin Braun

11 October 2025 10	Bohemians	3–2	Schalke 04	Dublin, Ireland
16:00 CEST (UTC+2)	Devoy 20'; McDonnell 64'; Mountney 90'	Report	Bachmann 51', 81'	Stadium: Dalymount Park; Attendance: 4,500; Referee: Rob Harvey

13 November 2025 11	Twente	1–0	Schalke 04	Enschede, Netherlands
19:30 CET (UTC+1)	Rots 53'	Report		Stadium: De Grolsch Veste; Attendance: 25,000; Referee: Robin Hensgens

10 January 2026 12	Schalke 04	2–0	VfL Osnabrück	Gelsenkirchen
14:15 CET (UTC+1)	Sylla 61'; Younes 68' (pen.)	Report		Stadium: Parkstadion; Attendance: 0 Referee: Lukas Benen

26 March 2026 13	1. FC Schweinfurt	2–0	Schalke 04	Schweinfurt
18:00 CET (UTC+1)	Grimbs 47'; Osawe 48'	Report		Stadium: Sachs-Stadion; Attendance: 4,792; Referee: Florian Badstübner

== Competitions ==
=== Overview ===
Competition	First match	Last match	Starting round	Final position	Record							
Competition	First match	Last match	Starting round	Final position	Pld	W	D	L	GF	GA	GD	Win %
2. Bundesliga	1 August 2025	17 May 2026	Matchday 1	Winners	34	21	7	6	50	31	+19	61.76
DFB-Pokal	17 August 2025	29 October 2025	First round	Second round	2	1	0	1	1	4	−3	50.00
Total					36	22	7	7	51	35	+16	61.11

Last updated: 18 May 2026
Source: Soccerway

=== 2. Bundesliga ===
==== League table ====
Pos	Team	Pld	W	D	L	GF	GA	GD	Pts	Promotion, qualification or relegation
1	Schalke 04 (C, P)	34	21	7	6	50	31	+19	70	Promotion to Bundesliga
2	SV Elversberg (P)	34	18	8	8	64	39	+25	62	Promotion to Bundesliga
3	SC Paderborn (O, P)	34	18	8	8	59	45	+14	62	Qualification for promotion play-offs
4	Hannover 96	34	16	12	6	60	44	+16	60	
5	Darmstadt 98	34	13	13	8	57	45	+12	52	

Source: Bundesliga
Rules for classification: 1) Points; 2) Goal difference; 3) Goals scored; 4) Head-to-head results; 5) Head-to-head away goals scored; 6) Away goals scored; 7) Play-off.
(Rules 4–6 only apply after home and away matches have been played between the tied teams.)
(C) Champions; (O) Play-off winners; (P) Promoted

==== Results summary ====
Overall								Home						Away					
Pld	W	D	L	GF	GA	GD	Pts	W	D	L	GF	GA	GD	W	D	L	GF	GA	GD
34	21	7	6	50	31	+19	70	13	3	1	29	14	+15	8	4	5	21	17	+4

Last updated: 18 May 2026.
Source: Soccerway

==== Results by round ====
Round	1	2	3	4	5	6	7	8	9	10	11	12	13	14	15	16	17	18	19	20	21	22	23	24	25	26	27	28	29	30	31	32	33	34
Ground	H	A	H	A	H	A	H	A	A	H	A	H	A	H	A	H	A	A	H	A	H	A	H	A	H	H	A	H	A	H	A	H	A	H
Result	W	L	W	W	L	W	W	W	W	W	L	W	D	W	W	W	L	D	D	L	D	W	W	D	W	D	D	W	W	W	W	W	L	W
Position	5	8	5	2	7	5	4	2	2	1	2	2	2	1	1	1	1	1	1	1	2	1	1	1	1	1	1	1	1	1	1	1	1	1
Points	3	3	6	9	9	12	15	18	21	24	24	27	28	31	34	37	37	38	39	39	40	43	46	47	50	51	52	55	58	61	64	67	67	70

Updated to match(es) played on 17 May 2026. Source: 2.Bundesliga Official Website
A = Away; H = Home; W = Win; D = Draw; L = Loss

==== Matches ====
1 August 2025 1	Schalke 04	2–1	Hertha BSC	Gelsenkirchen
20:30 CEST (UTC+2)	Sylla 16'; Katić 23'	Report	Grønning 89'	Stadium: Veltins-Arena; Attendance: 62,083; Referee: Richard Hempel

9 August 2025 2	1. FC Kaiserslautern	1–0	Schalke 04	Kaiserslautern
20:30 CEST (UTC+2)	Ritter 55' (pen.)	Report		Stadium: Fritz-Walter-Stadion; Attendance: 49,327; Referee: Martin Petersen

23 August 2025 3	Schalke 04	2–1	VfL Bochum	Gelsenkirchen
20:30 CEST (UTC+2)	Kuruçay 75'; Lasme 79'	Report	Holtmann 65'	Stadium: Veltins-Arena; Attendance: 62,083; Referee: Frank Willenborg

31 August 2025 4	Dynamo Dresden	0–1	Schalke 04	Dresden
13:30 CEST (UTC+2)		Report	Karaman 84' (pen.)	Stadium: Rudolf-Harbig-Stadion; Attendance: 31,707; Referee: Robert Hartmann

13 September 2025 5	Schalke 04	0–1	Holstein Kiel	Gelsenkirchen
13:00 CEST (UTC+2)		Report	Bernhardsson 6'	Stadium: Veltins-Arena; Attendance: 62,371; Referee: Robert Kampka

20 September 2025 6	1. FC Magdeburg	0–2	Schalke 04	Magdeburg
13:00 CEST (UTC+2)		Report	Karaman 10', 56' (pen.)	Stadium: MDCC-Arena; Attendance: 27,424; Referee: Felix Bickel

26 September 2025 7	Schalke 04	1–0	Greuther Fürth	Gelsenkirchen
18:30 CEST (UTC+2)	Porath 77'	Report		Stadium: Veltins-Arena; Attendance: 60,625; Referee: Luca Schlosser

5 October 2025 8	Arminia Bielefeld	1–2	Schalke 04	Bielefeld
13:30 CEST (UTC+2)	Großer 49'	Report	Antwi-Adjei 11'; Kuruçay 19'	Stadium: SchücoArena; Attendance: 26,400; Referee: Florian Badstübner

17 October 2025 9	Hannover 96	0–3	Schalke 04	Hanover
18:30 CEST (UTC+2)		Report	Sylla 3', 14'; Gomis 85'	Stadium: Heinz von Heiden Arena; Attendance: 49,000; Referee: Martin Petersen

24 October 2025 10	Schalke 04	1–0	Darmstadt 98	Gelsenkirchen
18:30 CEST (UTC+2)	Sylla 9'	Report		Stadium: Veltins-Arena; Attendance: 61,198; Referee: Michael Bacher

1 November 2025 11	Karlsruher SC	2–1	Schalke 04	Karlsruhe
13:00 CET (UTC+1)	Beifus 76'; Schleusener 90+3'	Report	Karaman 66' (pen.)	Stadium: Wildparkstadion; Attendance: 33,180; Referee: Max Burda

8 November 2025 12	Schalke 04	1–0	SV Elversberg	Gelsenkirchen
13:00 CET (UTC+1)	Kuruçay 4'	Report		Stadium: Veltins-Arena; Attendance: 61,818; Referee: Robin Braun

22 November 2025 13	Preußen Münster	0–0	Schalke 04	Münster
13:00 CET (UTC+1)		Report		Stadium: Preußenstadion; Attendance: 10,491; Referee: Florian Lechner

28 November 2025 14	Schalke 04	2–1	SC Paderborn	Gelsenkirchen
18:30 CET (UTC+1)	Karaman 45+3'; Lasme 86'	Report	Curda 38'	Stadium: Veltins-Arena; Attendance: 62,077; Referee: Tobias Reichel

5 December 2025 15	Fortuna Düsseldorf	0–2	Schalke 04	Düsseldorf
18:30 CET (UTC+1)		Report	Karaman 45+2' (pen.); V. Becker 81'	Stadium: Merkur Spiel-Arena; Attendance: 51,500; Referee: Felix Prigan

14 December 2025 16	Schalke 04	1–0	1. FC Nürnberg	Gelsenkirchen
13:30 CET (UTC+1)	V. Becker 52'	Report		Stadium: Veltins-Arena; Attendance: 62,278; Referee: Christian Dingert

21 December 2025 17	Eintracht Braunschweig	2–1	Schalke 04	Braunschweig
13:30 CET (UTC+1)	Aydın 60'; Sané 85'	Report	El-Faouzi 88'	Stadium: Eintracht-Stadion; Attendance: 23,080; Referee: Lars Erbst

17 January 2026 18	Hertha BSC	0–0	Schalke 04	Berlin
20:30 CET (UTC+1)		Report		Stadium: Olympiastadion; Attendance: 71,157; Referee: Wolfgang Haslberger

25 January 2026 19	Schalke 04	2–2	1. FC Kaiserslautern	Gelsenkirchen
13:30 CET (UTC+1)	Džeko 87'; Karaman 90'	Report	Prtajin 61', 84'	Stadium: Veltins-Arena; Attendance: 62,077; Referee: Felix Zwayer

31 January 2026 20	VfL Bochum	2–0	Schalke 04	Bochum
13:00 CET (UTC+1)	Miyoshi 1'; Hofmann 43'	Report		Stadium: Ruhrstadion; Attendance: 26,000; Referee: Michael Bacher

7 February 2026 21	Schalke 04	2–2	Dynamo Dresden	Gelsenkirchen
13:00 CET (UTC+1)	Džeko 52', 70'	Report	Kuruçay 78' (o.g.); Keller 87'	Stadium: Veltins-Arena; Attendance: 61,624; Referee: Tobias Welz

15 February 2026 22	Holstein Kiel	1–2	Schalke 04	Kiel
13:30 CET (UTC+1)	Zec 55' (pen.)	Report	Karaman 16'; Kuruçay 29'	Stadium: Holstein-Stadion; Attendance: 15,034; Referee: Florian Lechner

21 February 2026 23	Schalke 04	5–3	1. FC Magdeburg	Gelsenkirchen
20:30 CET (UTC+1)	Hugonet 15' (o.g.); Džeko 39'; Karaman 49' (pen.), 68'; Ljubičić 65'	Report	Nollenberger 17'; Żukowski 53' (pen.), 84'	Stadium: Veltins-Arena; Attendance: 61,378; Referee: Timo Gerach

28 February 2026 24	Greuther Fürth	1–1	Schalke 04	Fürth
20:30 CET (UTC+1)	Srbeny 12'	Report	Ljubičić 75'	Stadium: Sportpark Ronhof Thomas Sommer; Attendance: 16,126; Referee: Robert Kampka

6 March 2026 25	Schalke 04	1–0	Arminia Bielefeld	Gelsenkirchen
18:30 CET (UTC+1)	Džeko 15'	Report		Stadium: Veltins-Arena; Attendance: 62,077; Referee: Tobias Reichel

15 March 2026 26	Schalke 04	2–2	Hannover 96	Gelsenkirchen
13:30 CET (UTC+1)	Džeko 29'; Karaman 38'	Report	Nawrocki 82'; Pichler 90+8'	Stadium: Veltins-Arena; Attendance: 62,077; Referee: Robin Braun

21 March 2026 27	Darmstadt 98	1–1	Schalke 04	Darmstadt
20:30 CET (UTC+1)	Lidberg 45+5'	Report	Sylla 44'	Stadium: Merck-Stadion am Böllenfalltor; Attendance: 17,810; Referee: Robert Hartmann

5 April 2026 28	Schalke 04	1–0	Karlsruher SC	Gelsenkirchen
13:30 CEST (UTC+2)	Karaman 72'	Report		Stadium: Veltins-Arena; Attendance: 61,838; Referee: Richard Hempel

12 April 2026 29	SV Elversberg	1–2	Schalke 04	Spiesen-Elversberg
13:30 CEST (UTC+2)	Schnellbacher 4'	Report	El-Faouzi 28'; Sylla 56'	Stadium: Waldstadion an der Kaiserlinde; Attendance: 9,307; Referee: Michael Bacher

19 April 2026 30	Schalke 04	4–1	Preußen Münster	Gelsenkirchen
13:30 CEST (UTC+2)	Karaman 36'; Heuer 45' (o.g.); Aouchiche 51'; Sylla 66'	Report	Yamada 82'	Stadium: Veltins-Arena; Attendance: 62,077; Referee: Deniz Aytekin

26 April 2026 31	SC Paderborn	2–3	Schalke 04	Paderborn
13:30 CEST (UTC+2)	Curda 13'; Marino 26'	Report	Ljubičić 35', 83'; Aouchiche 40'	Stadium: Home Deluxe Arena; Attendance: 15,000; Referee: Matthias Jöllenbeck

2 May 2026 32	Schalke 04	1–0	Fortuna Düsseldorf	Gelsenkirchen
20:30 CEST (UTC+2)	Karaman 15'	Report		Stadium: Veltins-Arena; Attendance: 61,587; Referee: Patrick Ittrich

9 May 2026 33	1. FC Nürnberg	3–0	Schalke 04	Nuremberg
20:30 CEST (UTC+2)	Schallenberg 19' (o.g.); Koudossou 45+1'; Zoma 72'	Report		Stadium: Max-Morlock-Stadion; Attendance: 47,000; Referee: Felix Prigan

17 May 2026 34	Schalke 04	1–0	Eintracht Braunschweig	Gelsenkirchen
15:30 CEST (UTC+2)	Aouchiche 36'	Report		Stadium: Veltins-Arena; Attendance: 61,320; Referee: Robert Kampka

=== DFB-Pokal ===
17 August 2025 1R	Lokomotive Leipzig	0–1 (a.e.t.)	Schalke 04	Leipzig
15:30 CEST (UTC+2)		Report	Lasme 107'	Stadium: Bruno-Plache-Stadion; Attendance: 11,900; Referee: Max Burda

29 October 2025 2R	Darmstadt 98	4–0	Schalke 04	Darmstadt
20:45 CET (UTC+1)	Maglica 23'; Akiyama 28'; Hornby 48'; Białek 60'	Report		Stadium: Merck-Stadion am Böllenfalltor; Attendance: 17,810; Referee: Felix Bickel

== Statistics ==
As of end of 2025–26 season

=== Squad statistics ===
A = Appearances, S = Starts, G = Goals, (yellow card) = yellow cards, (red card) = red cards

No.	Player	Nat	Pos	2. Bundesliga					DFB-Pokal					Total				
No.	Player	Nat	Pos	A	S	G	Yellow card	Red card	A	S	G	Yellow card	Red card	A	S	G	Yellow card	Red card
Goalkeepers
1	Loris Karius	(Germany)	GK	30	30	0	3	0	1	1	0	0	0	31	31	0	3	0
22	Kevin Müller	(Germany)	GK	4	4	0	0	0	0	0	0	0	0	4	4	0	0	0
~~28~~	Justin Heekeren	(Germany)	GK	0	0	0	1	0	1	1	0	0	0	1	1	0	0	0
Defenders
2	Felipe Sánchez	(Argentina)	DF	25	7	0	2	0	2	0	0	1	0	27	7	0	3	0
3	Dylan Leonard	(Australia)	DF	2	0	0	0	0	0	0	0	0	0	2	0	0	0	0
4	Hasan Kuruçay	(Turkey)	DF	30	28	4	6	0	2	2	0	0	0	32	30	4	6	0
5	Timo Becker	(Germany)	DF	26	24	0	4	0	1	1	0	0	0	27	25	0	4	0
16	Moussa N'Diaye	(Senegal)	DF	14	13	0	1	1	0	0	0	0	0	14	13	0	1	1
17	Adrian Gantenbein	(Switzerland)	DF	19	10	0	5	0	2	1	0	0	0	21	11	0	5	0
25	Nikola Katić	(Bosnia and Herzegovina)	DF	26	25	1	5	1	2	2	0	1	0	28	27	1	6	1
26	Tomáš Kalas	(Czech Republic)	DF	0	0	0	0	0	0	0	0	0	0	0	0	0	0	0
30	Anton Donkor	(Germany)	DF	2	0	0	0	0	1	0	0	0	0	3	0	0	0	0
31	Tim-Justin Dietrich^{U23}	(Germany)	DF	1	0	0	0	0	0	0	0	0	0	1	0	0	0	0
33	Vitalie Becker	(Germany)	DF	21	18	2	6	0	1	1	0	1	0	22	19	2	7	0
41	Henning Matriciani	(Germany)	DF	1	0	0	1	0	0	0	0	0	0	1	0	0	1	0
43	Mertcan Ayhan	(Turkey)	DF	27	20	0	6	0	2	1	0	0	0	29	21	0	6	0
~~31~~	Taylan Bulut	(Germany)	DF	2	0	0	0	0	0	0	0	0	0	2	0	0	0	0
Midfielders
6	Ron Schallenberg	(Germany)	MF	33	33	0	4	0	1	1	0	0	0	34	34	0	4	0
14	Janik Bachmann	(Germany)	MF	23	2	0	2	0	2	1	0	0	0	25	3	0	2	0
18	Christopher Antwi-Adjei	(Ghana)	MF	14	8	1	1	0	1	1	0	0	0	15	9	1	1	0
21	Dejan Ljubičić	(Austria)	MF	15	15	4	3	0	0	0	0	0	0	15	15	4	3	0
23	Soufiane El-Faouzi	(Morocco)	MF	34	34	2	4	0	2	2	0	0	0	36	36	2	4	0
24	Adil Aouchiche	(Algeria)	MF	14	13	3	3	0	0	0	0	0	0	14	13	3	3	0
27	Finn Porath	(Germany)	MF	18	6	1	3	0	1	1	0	0	0	19	7	1	3	0
34	Ayman Gülaşı^{U23}	(Turkey)	MF	1	0	0	0	0	0	0	0	0	0	1	0	0	0	0
37	Max Grüger	(Germany)	MF	4	0	0	1	0	2	1	0	0	0	6	1	0	1	0
46	Paul Pöpperl^{U23}	(Germany)	MF	3	1	0	0	0	0	0	0	0	0	3	1	0	0	0
~~8~~	Amin Younes	(Germany)	MF	5	3	0	1	0	1	0	0	0	0	6	3	0	1	0
~~16~~	Mauro Zalazar	(Uruguay)	MF	1	0	0	0	0	0	0	0	0	0	1	0	0	0	0
Forwards
7	Christian Gomis	(Senegal)	FW	19	8	1	2	0	0	0	0	0	0	19	8	1	2	0
9	Moussa Sylla	(Mali)	FW	30	25	7	1	0	2	2	0	0	0	32	27	7	1	0
10	Edin Džeko	(Bosnia and Herzegovina)	FW	11	6	6	0	1	0	0	0	0	0	11	6	6	0	1
11	Bryan Lasme	(France)	FW	12	0	2	0	0	1	0	1	0	0	13	0	3	0	0
15	Emil Højlund	(Denmark)	FW	4	1	0	1	0	1	1	0	0	0	5	2	0	1	0
19	Kenan Karaman	(Turkey)	FW	32	31	14	5	0	2	2	0	0	0	34	33	14	5	0
35	Mika Wallentowitz^{U19}	(Germany)	FW	13	7	0	1	0	0	0	0	0	0	13	7	0	1	0
39	Peter Remmert	(Germany)	FW	3	2	0	0	0	1	0	0	0	0	4	2	0	0	0
47	Zaid Tchibara	(Togo)	FW	1	0	0	0	0	0	0	0	0	0	1	0	0	0	0
Total				34		48	67	3	2		1	3	0	36		49	70	3

Players in white left the club during the season.

=== Goalscorers ===
Rank	Player	Nat	Pos	2. Liga	DFB-Pokal	Total
1	Kenan Karaman	(Turkey)	FW	14	0	14
2	Moussa Sylla	(Mali)	FW	7	0	7
3	Edin Džeko	(Bosnia and Herzegovina)	FW	6	0	6
4	Hasan Kuruçay	(Turkey)	DF	4	0	4
4	Dejan Ljubičić	(Austria)	MF	4	0	4
6	Adil Aouchiche	(Algeria)	MF	3	0	3
6	Bryan Lasme	(France)	FW	2	1	3
8	Vitalie Becker	(Germany)	DF	2	0	2
8	Soufiane El-Faouzi	(Morocco)	MF	2	0	2
10	Christopher Antwi-Adjei	(Ghana)	MF	1	0	1
10	Christian Gomis	(Senegal)	FW	1	0	1
10	Nikola Katić	(Bosnia and Herzegovina)	DF	1	0	1
10	Finn Porath	(Germany)	MF	1	0	1
Own goals				2	0	2
Total				50	1	51

=== Assists ===
Rank	Player	Nat	Pos	2. Liga	DFB-Pokal	Total
1	Kenan Karaman	(Turkey)	FW	7	0	7
2	Adil Aouchiche	(Algeria)	MF	5	0	5
2	Soufiane El-Faouzi	(Morocco)	MF	5	0	5
2	Moussa Sylla	(Mali)	FW	5	0	5
5	Edin Džeko	(Bosnia and Herzegovina)	FW	4	0	4
5	Nikola Katić	(Bosnia and Herzegovina)	DF	3	1	4
7	Dejan Ljubičić	(Austria)	MF	3	0	3
8	Timo Becker	(Germany)	DF	2	0	2
8	Moussa N'Diaye	(Senegal)	DF	2	0	2
8	Ron Schallenberg	(Germany)	MF	2	0	2
11	Christopher Antwi-Adjei	(Ghana)	MF	1	0	1
11	Mertcan Ayhan	(Turkey)	DF	1	0	1
11	Vitalie Becker	(Germany)	DF	1	0	1
11	Christian Gomis	(Senegal)	FW	1	0	1
11	Finn Porath	(Germany)	MF	1	0	1
11	Peter Remmert	(Germany)	FW	1	0	1
11	Zaid Tchibara	(Togo)	FW	1	0	1
11	Mika Wallentowitz	(Germany)	FW	1	0	1
Total				46	1	47

=== Clean sheets ===
Rank	Player	Nat	2. Liga	DFB-Pokal	Total
1	Loris Karius	(Germany)	13	0	13
2	Kevin Müller	(Germany)	1	0	1
2	Justin Heekeren	(Germany)	0	1	1
Total			14	1	15
