= Timo Becker =

German footballer (born 1997)

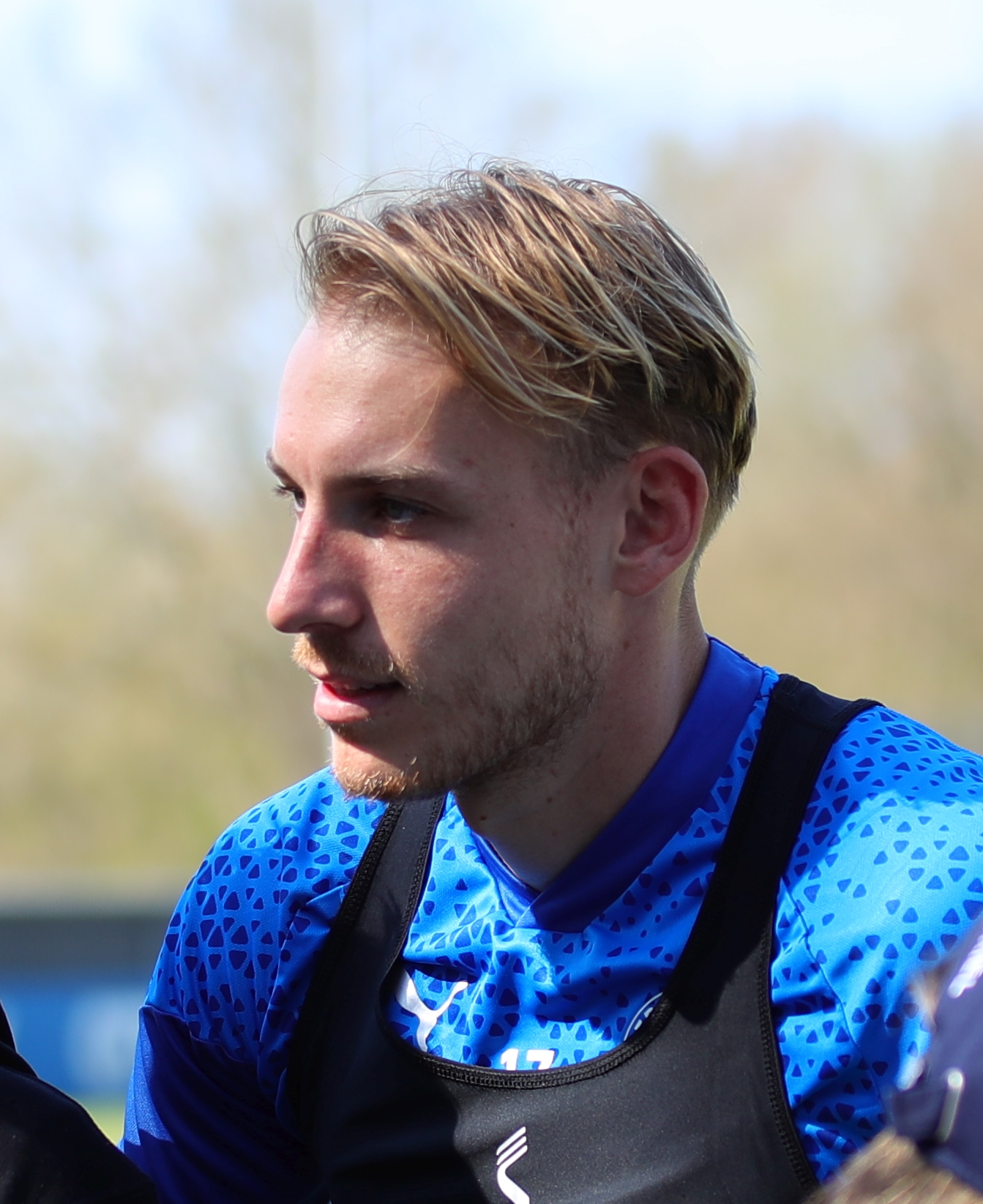
- Becker with Holstein Kiel in 2025

Personal information
- Date of birth: 25 March 1997 (age 29)
- Place of birth: Herten, Germany
- Height: 1.90 m (6 ft 3 in)
- Position: Centre-back

Team information
- Current team: Schalke 04
- Number: 5

Youth career
- 2000–2001: SV Erle 08
- 2001–2007: SSV Buer
- 2007–2013: Schalke 04
- 2013–2016: Rot-Weiss Essen

Senior career*
Years	Team	Apps	(Gls)
2016–2019	Rot-Weiss Essen	74	(5)
2019–2021	Schalke 04 II	30	(4)
2019–2022	Schalke 04	35	(0)
2022	→ Hansa Rostock (loan)	14	(0)
2022–2025	Holstein Kiel	82	(10)
2025–	Schalke 04	34	(0)
- * Club domestic league appearances and goals as of 17 November 2026

Timo Becker (born 25 March 1997) is a German professional footballer who plays as a centre-back for Bundesliga club Schalke 04.

== Career ==
Becker made his professional debut for Schalke 04 in the Bundesliga on 29 November 2019, coming on as a substitute in the 90th minute in a 2–1 home win against Union Berlin. In January 2022, he joined Hansa Rostock on loan until the end of the season.

On 10 June 2022, Becker agreed to join Holstein Kiel, signing a three-year contract.

On 7 April 2025, Becker agreed to rejoin Schalke 04 on a free transfer for the 2025–26 season, signing a four-year contract.

== Career statistics ==
As of match played 31 October 2026

Appearances and goals by club, season and competition
Club	Season	League			DFB-Pokal		Total	
Club	Season	Division	Apps	Goals	Apps	Goals	Apps	Goals
Rot Weiss Essen	2015–16	Regionalliga West	2	0	0	0	2	0
Rot Weiss Essen	2016–17	Regionalliga West	17	1	1	0	18	1
Rot Weiss Essen	2017–18	Regionalliga West	25	2	0	0	25	2
Rot Weiss Essen	2018–19	Regionalliga West	30	2	—		30	2
Rot Weiss Essen	Total		74	5	1	0	75	5
Schalke 04 II	2019–20	Regionalliga West	16	3	—		16	3
Schalke 04 II	2020–21	Regionalliga West	7	0	—		7	0
Schalke 04 II	2021–22	Regionalliga West	6	1	—		7	1
Schalke 04 II	Total		30	4	—		30	4
Schalke 04	2019–20	Bundesliga	10	0	1	0	11	0
Schalke 04	2020–21	Bundesliga	20	0	2	0	22	0
Schalke 04	2021–22	2. Bundesliga	5	0	1	0	6	0
Schalke 04	Total		35	0	4	0	39	0
Hansa Rostock (loan)	2021–22	2. Bundesliga	14	0	—		14	0
Holstein Kiel	2022–23	2. Bundesliga	24	3	1	0	25	3
Holstein Kiel	2023–24	2. Bundesliga	28	7	1	0	29	7
Holstein Kiel	2024–25	Bundesliga	30	0	2	0	32	0
Holstein Kiel	Total		82	10	4	0	86	10
Schalke 04	2025–26	2. Bundesliga	26	0	1	0	27	0
Schalke 04	2026–27	Bundesliga	8	0	2	0	10	0
Schalke 04	Total		34	0	3	0	37	0
Career total			269	19	12	0	281	19

== Honours ==
Schalke 04

- 2. Bundesliga: 2025–26
