= Vitalie Becker =

German footballer (born 2005)

Personal information
- Date of birth: 3 March 2005 (age 21)
- Place of birth: Bottrop, Germany
- Height: 1.79 m (5 ft 10 in)
- Position: Left-back

Team information
- Current team: Schalke 04
- Number: 33

Youth career
- 2010–2013: SV Zweckel
- 2013–2024: Schalke 04

Senior career*
Years	Team	Apps	(Gls)
2024–	Schalke 04	28	(2)
2024–2026	Schalke 04 II	17	(1)

International career^{‡}
2021–2022	Germany U17	8	(0)
2023–2024	Germany U19	5	(0)
2025	Germany U20	4	(0)
- * Club domestic league appearances and goals as of 17 November 2026 ‡ National team caps and goals as of 13 October 2025

Vitalie Becker (born 3 March 2005) is a German professional footballer who plays as a left-back for Bundesliga club Schalke 04.

== Club career ==
Becker signed a professional contract with Schalke 04 on 22 February 2024, lasting until 30 June 2027. He made his first team debut for the club in the 2. Bundesliga in a 2–1 home win against Hertha BSC on 1 August 2025.

== International career ==
Becker has represented Germany at under-17, under-19 and under-20 level.

== Career statistics ==
As of match played 8 November 2026

Appearances and goals by club, season and competition
Club	Season	League			DFB-Pokal		Total	
Club	Season	Division	Apps	Goals	Apps	Goals	Apps	Goals
Schalke 04 II	2024–25	Regionalliga West	16	1	—		16	1
Schalke 04 II	2025–26	Regionalliga West	1	0	—		1	0
Schalke 04 II	Total		17	1	—		17	1
Schalke 04	2024–25	2. Bundesliga	0	0	0	0	0	0
Schalke 04	2025–26	2. Bundesliga	21	2	1	0	22	2
Schalke 04	2026–27	Bundesliga	7	0	2	0	9	0
Schalke 04	Total		28	2	3	0	31	2
Career total			45	3	3	0	48	3

== Honours ==
Schalke 04

- 2. Bundesliga: 2025–26
