= Mertcan Ayhan =

Turkish footballer (born 2006)

Personal information
- Date of birth: 8 September 2006 (age 20)
- Place of birth: Gelsenkirchen, Germany
- Height: 1.90 m (6 ft 3 in)
- Position: Centre-back

Team information
- Current team: Schalke 04
- Number: 43

Youth career
- 2010–2014: TuS Rotthausen
- 2014–2025: Schalke 04

Senior career*
Years	Team	Apps	(Gls)
2025–	Schalke 04	31	(0)
2025–2026	Schalke 04 II	2	(0)

International career^{‡}
2022–2023	Turkey U17	18	(3)
2023	Turkey U18	3	(0)
2024–2025	Turkey U19	5	(1)
2026–	Turkey U21	3	(0)
- * Club domestic league appearances and goals as of 17 November 2026 ‡ National team caps and goals as of 17 November 2026

Mertcan Ayhan (born 8 September 2006) is a professional footballer who plays as a centre-back for Bundesliga club Schalke 04. Born in Germany, he represents Turkey at international youth level.

== Club career ==
Ayhan signed a professional contract with Schalke 04 on 21 July 2025, lasting until June 2028. He made his first team debut for the club in the 2. Bundesliga in a 2–1 home win against Hertha BSC on 1 August 2025.

== International career ==
Ayhan has represented Turkey at under-17, under-18, under-19 and under-21 level.

== Personal life ==
Ayhan is the younger brother of Turkish international player Kaan Ayhan, who also started his professional football career at Schalke 04.

== Career statistics ==
As of match played 8 November 2026

Appearances and goals by club, season and competition
Club	Season	League			DFB-Pokal		Total	
Club	Season	Division	Apps	Goals	Apps	Goals	Apps	Goals
Schalke 04	2025–26	2. Bundesliga	27	0	2	0	29	0
Schalke 04	2026–27	Bundesliga	4	0	2	0	6	0
Schalke 04	Total		31	0	4	0	35	0
Schalke 04 II	2025–26	Regionalliga West	1	0	—		1	0
Schalke 04 II	2026–27	Regionalliga West	1	0	—		1	0
Schalke 04 II	Total		2	0	—		2	0
Career total			33	0	4	0	37	0

== Honours ==
Schalke 04

- 2. Bundesliga: 2025–26
