= Janik Bachmann =

German footballer

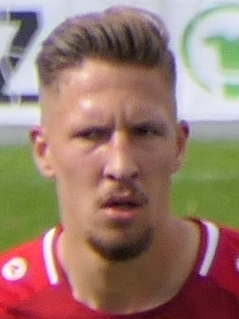
- Bachmann in 2018

Personal information
- Full name: Janik Jay Bachmann
- Date of birth: 6 May 1996 (age 30)
- Place of birth: Groß-Umstadt, Germany
- Height: 1.96 m (6 ft 5 in)
- Position: Midfielder

Team information
- Current team: Schalke 04
- Number: 14

Youth career
- 1999–2008: Germania Babenhausen
- 2008–2010: Eintracht Frankfurt
- 2010–2015: Darmstadt 98

Senior career*
Years	Team	Apps	(Gls)
2015–2017	Hannover 96 II	55	(1)
2017–2018	Chemnitzer FC	15	(1)
2018–2019	Würzburger Kickers	31	(4)
2019–2021	1. FC Kaiserslautern	47	(2)
2021–2023	SV Sandhausen	77	(10)
2023–2024	Hansa Rostock	21	(0)
2024–	Schalke 04	49	(3)
2026–	Schalke 04 II	1	(0)
- * Club domestic league appearances and goals as of 20 October 2026

Janik Jay Bachmann (born 6 May 1996) is a German professional footballer who plays as a midfielder for Bundesliga club Schalke 04.

== Career ==
On 29 May 2024, Schalke 04 announced that they had signed Bachmann on a free transfer until 30 June 2027.

== Career statistics ==
As of match played 10 October 2026

Appearances and goals by club, season and competition
Club	Season	League			DFB-Pokal		Total	
Club	Season	Division	Apps	Goals	Apps	Goals	Apps	Goals
Hannover 96 II	2015–16	Regionalliga Nord	22	1	—		22	1
Hannover 96 II	2016–17	Regionalliga Nord	33	0	—		33	0
Hannover 96 II	Total		55	1	—		55	1
Chemnitzer FC	2017–18	3. Liga	15	1	0	0	15	1
Würzburger Kickers	2018–19	3. Liga	31	4	—		31	4
1. FC Kaiserslautern	2019–20	3. Liga	33	1	2	0	35	1
1. FC Kaiserslautern	2020–21	3. Liga	14	1	1	0	15	1
1. FC Kaiserslautern	Total		47	2	3	0	50	2
SV Sandhausen	2020–21	2. Bundesliga	16	1	—		16	1
SV Sandhausen	2021–22	2. Bundesliga	33	6	1	0	34	6
SV Sandhausen	2022–23	2. Bundesliga	28	3	3	2	31	5
SV Sandhausen	Total		77	10	4	2	81	12
Hansa Rostock	2023–24	2. Bundesliga	21	0	2	0	23	0
Schalke 04	2024–25	2. Bundesliga	25	3	2	0	27	3
Schalke 04	2025–26	2. Bundesliga	23	0	2	0	25	0
Schalke 04	2026–27	Bundesliga	1	0	0	0	1	0
Schalke 04	Total		49	3	4	0	53	3
Schalke 04 II	2026–27	Regionalliga West	1	0	—		1	0
Career total			296	21	13	2	309	23

== Honours ==
Schalke 04

- 2. Bundesliga: 2025–26
