= Henning Matriciani =

German footballer (born 2000)

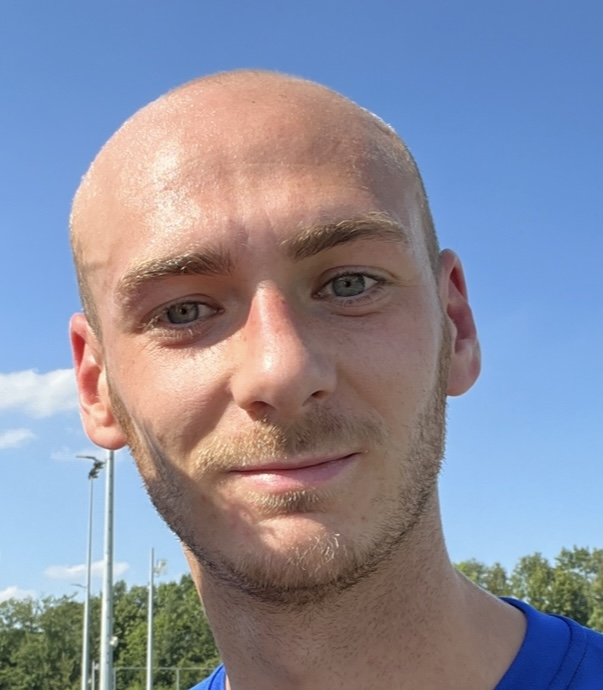
- Matriciani in 2024

Personal information
- Date of birth: 14 March 2000 (age 26)
- Place of birth: Lippstadt, Germany
- Height: 1.87 m (6 ft 2 in)
- Positions: Centre-back; right-back

Youth career
- 2006–2011: SuS Bad Westernkotten
- 2011–2014: SV Lippstadt
- 2014–2016: Arminia Bielefeld
- 2016–2019: SV Lippstadt

Senior career*
Years	Team	Apps	(Gls)
2018–2020	SV Lippstadt	17	(0)
2020–2025	Schalke 04 II	39	(0)
2021–2026	Schalke 04	61	(0)
2024–2025	→ Waldhof Mannheim (loan)	33	(1)

International career
2023	Germany U21	4	(0)
- * Club domestic league appearances and goals as of 2 July 2026

Henning Matriciani (born 14 March 2000) is a German professional footballer who plays as a centre-back or right-back.

== Club career ==
Matriciani made his first team debut for Schalke 04 in a 4–3 home win against Eintracht Frankfurt on 15 May 2021, coming on as a substitute in the 67th minute. He signed a professional contract with the club on 28 September 2021, lasting until 2024.

On 26 August 2024, he joined Waldhof Mannheim on a season-long loan.

== International career ==
Matriciani debuted for the German U-21 national team in a 0–0 draw against Romania on 28 March 2023, coming on as a substitute in the 76th minute.

== Career statistics ==
As of 2 July 2026

Appearances and goals by club, season and competition
Club	Season	League			DFB-Pokal		Total	
Club	Season	Division	Apps	Goals	Apps	Goals	Apps	Goals
SV Lippstadt	2018–19	Regionalliga West	2	0	—		2	0
SV Lippstadt	2019–20	Regionalliga West	15	0	—		15	0
SV Lippstadt	Total		17	0	—		17	0
Schalke 04 II	2020–21	Regionalliga West	30	0	—		30	0
Schalke 04 II	2021–22	Regionalliga West	7	0	—		7	0
Schalke 04 II	2022–23	Regionalliga West	1	0	—		1	0
Schalke 04 II	2025–26	Regionalliga West	1	0	—		1	0
Schalke 04 II	Total		39	0	—		39	0
Schalke 04	2020–21	Bundesliga	1	0	0	0	1	0
Schalke 04	2021–22	2. Bundesliga	12	0	0	0	12	0
Schalke 04	2022–23	Bundesliga	22	0	1	0	23	0
Schalke 04	2023–24	2. Bundesliga	25	0	2	0	27	0
Schalke 04	2025–26	2. Bundesliga	1	0	0	0	1	0
Schalke 04	Total		61	0	3	0	64	0
Waldhof Mannheim (loan)	2024–25	3. Liga	33	1	—		33	1
Career total			150	1	3	0	153	1

== Honours ==
Schalke 04

- 2. Bundesliga: 2021–22, 2025–26
