= Soufiane El-Faouzi =

Moroccan footballer (born 2002)

Personal information
- Date of birth: 13 July 2002 (age 24)
- Place of birth: Siegen, Germany
- Height: 1.77 m (5 ft 10 in)
- Position: Midfielder

Team information
- Current team: Schalke 04
- Number: 23

Youth career
- 2010–2020: Sportfreunde Siegen
- 2020–2021: SC Paderborn

Senior career*
Years	Team	Apps	(Gls)
2019	Sportfreunde Siegen	1	(0)
2020–2022	SC Paderborn II	21	(6)
2022–2024	Fortuna Düsseldorf II	48	(2)
2024–2025	Alemannia Aachen	36	(3)
2025–	Schalke 04	38	(2)

International career^{‡}
2026–	Morocco	2	(0)
- * Club domestic league appearances and goals as of 29 September 2026 ‡ National team caps and goals as of 29 September 2026

Soufiane El-Faouzi (born 13 July 2002) is a professional footballer who plays as a midfielder for Bundesliga club Schalke 04. Born in Germany, he plays for the Morocco national team.

== Club career ==
On 8 May 2024, El-Faouzi signed with Alemannia Aachen.

On 19 June 2025, Schalke 04 announced that they had signed El-Faouzi until June 2029. He made his debut for the club in the 2. Bundesliga in a 2–1 home win against Hertha BSC on 1 August 2025.

== International career ==
In May 2026, El-Faouzi was called up to the Morocco national team for a training camp ahead of the 2026 FIFA World Cup. He made his debut on 26 May in a 5–0 friendly win over Burundi, but was not named to the World Cup squad.

In September 2026, despite a strong interest and call from Jürgen Klopp to join the Germany national team, El Faouzi declined and was called up to the Morocco national team.

== Personal life ==
Born in Germany, El-Faouzi is of Moroccan-Riffian descent and holds dual German and Moroccan citizenship.

== Career statistics ==
=== Club ===
As of match played 20 September 2026

Appearances and goals by club, season and competition
Club	Season	League			DFB-Pokal		Total	
Club	Season	Division	Apps	Goals	Apps	Goals	Apps	Goals
Sportfreunde Siegen	2019–20	Oberliga Westfalen	1	0	—		1	0
SC Paderborn II	2020–21	Oberliga Westfalen	3	0	—		3	0
SC Paderborn II	2021–22	Oberliga Westfalen	18	6	—		18	6
SC Paderborn II	Total		21	6	—		21	6
Fortuna Düsseldorf II	2022–23	Regionalliga West	17	1	—		17	1
Fortuna Düsseldorf II	2023–24	Regionalliga West	31	1	—		31	1
Fortuna Düsseldorf II	Total		48	2	—		48	2
Alemannia Aachen	2024–25	3. Liga	36	3	1	0	37	3
Schalke 04	2025–26	2. Bundesliga	34	2	2	0	36	2
Schalke 04	2026–27	Bundesliga	4	0	1	0	5	0
Schalke 04	Total		38	2	3	0	41	2
Career total			144	13	4	0	148	13

=== International ===
As of match played 29 September 2026

Appearances and goals by national team and year
National team	Year	Apps	Goals
Morocco	2026	2	0
Total		2	0

== Honours ==
Schalke 04

- 2. Bundesliga: 2025–26

Individual

- 2. Bundesliga Goal of the Season: 2025–26
