= Ayman Gülaşı =

Footballer (born 2006)

Personal information
- Full name: Ayman Emran Gülaşı
- Date of birth: 5 May 2006 (age 20)
- Place of birth: Sydney, Australia
- Position: Attacking midfielder

Team information
- Current team: Schalke 04 II
- Number: 11

Youth career
- –2020: Sydney Olympic
- 2021–2022: Western Sydney Wanderers
- 2023–2024: Macarthur FC
- 2024–2025: Schalke 04

Senior career*
| Years | Team | Apps | (Gls) |
| 2023 | Bulls FC Academy | 12 | (0) |
| 2025– | Schalke 04 II | 15 | (2) |
| 2025– | Schalke 04 | 1 | (0) |

International career^{‡}
| 2022–2023 | Australia U17 | 3 | (2) |
| 2024 | Turkey U19 | 3 | (1) |
| 2024– | Turkey U20 | 1 | (0) |
- * Club domestic league appearances and goals as of 9 November 2026 ‡ National team caps and goals as of 23 January 2025

Ayman Emran Gülaşı (born 5 May 2006) is a footballer who plays as a attacking midfielder for Regionalliga club Schalke 04 II. Born in Australia, he plays for the Turkey national under-20 team.

== Club career ==
=== Youth career ===
Gülaşı was born in Sydney, Australia, of Turkish descent from his father. Since he was 13 years old, while playing for Sydney Olympic at the time, Gülaşı was scouted and handed numerous trials by Schalke 04 after he had impressed the club from a youth tournament in Germany. He was described to be one of the most mercurial and creative players in Australia by the club's scouts.

After a year of negotiations, Gülaşı signed for Schalke on 1 July 2024 for the under-19s team.

=== Schalke 04 ===
Gülaşı signed a professional contract with Schalke 04 on 16 January 2025, lasting until 2028, but initially played for their second team. He made his first team debut for the club in the 2. Bundesliga in a 0–0 away draw against Preußen Münster on 22 November 2025.

== Career statistics ==
As of match played 6 November 2026

Appearances and goals by club, season and competition
| Club | Season | League | | | Cup | | Total | |
| Club | Season | Division | Apps | Goals | Apps | Goals | Apps | Goals |
|---|---|---|---|---|---|---|---|---|
| Bulls FC Academy | 2023 | National Premier Leagues NSW | 12 | 0 | — | | 12 | 0 |
| Schalke 04 II | 2025–26 | Regionalliga West | 9 | 2 | — | | 9 | 2 |
| Schalke 04 II | 2026–27 | Regionalliga West | 6 | 0 | — | | 6 | 0 |
| Schalke 04 II | Total | | 15 | 2 | — | | 15 | 2 |
| Schalke 04 | 2025–26 | 2. Bundesliga | 1 | 0 | 0 | 0 | 1 | 0 |
| Career total | | | 28 | 2 | 0 | 0 | 28 | 2 |

== Honours ==
Schalke 04

- 2. Bundesliga: 2025–26
