= Mika Wallentowitz =

German footballer (born 2007)

Personal information
- Full name: Mika Tom Wallentowitz
- Date of birth: 28 December 2007 (age 18)
- Place of birth: Germany
- Height: 1.87 m (6 ft 2 in)
- Position: Right wing-back

Team information
- Current team: Greuther Fürth (on loan from Schalke 04)
- Number: 21

Youth career
- 2012–2016: SC Lehe/Spaden
- 2017–2020: LTS Bremerhaven
- 2020–2023: JFV Bremerhaven
- 2023–2024: Werder Bremen
- 2024–2026: Schalke 04

Senior career*
Years	Team	Apps	(Gls)
2024	Schalke 04 II	1	(0)
2025–	Schalke 04	13	(0)
2026–	→ Greuther Fürth (loan)	0	(0)

International career^{‡}
2026–	Germany U19	5	(0)
Medal record
Men's football
Representing Germany
UEFA European Under-19 Championship
Runner-up	2026 Wales
- * Club domestic league appearances and goals as of 25 July 2026 ‡ National team caps and goals as of 12 July 2026

Mika Tom Wallentowitz (German pronunciation: [ˈmiːka tɔm ˈvalənˌtɔvɪts]; born 28 December 2007) is a German professional footballer who plays as a right wing-back for 2. Bundesliga club Greuther Fürth, on loan from Schalke 04.

== Club career ==
=== Schalke 04 ===
Wallentowitz made his first team debut for Schalke 04 in the 2. Bundesliga in a 1–0 home win against Darmstadt 98 on 24 October 2025. He signed a professional contract with the club on 6 May 2026, lasting until 2030.

==== Loan to Greuther Fürth ====
On 24 July 2026, he was loaned to Greuther Fürth for the 2026–27 season.

== International career ==
Wallentowitz has represented Germany at under-19 level.

== Career statistics ==
As of 25 July 2026

Appearances and goals by club, season and competition
Club	Season	League			DFB-Pokal		Total	
Club	Season	Division	Apps	Goals	Apps	Goals	Apps	Goals
Schalke 04 II	2024–25	Regionalliga West	1	0	—		1	0
Schalke 04	2025–26	2. Bundesliga	13	0	0	0	13	0
Greuther Fürth (loan)	2026–27	2. Bundesliga	0	0	0	0	0	0
Career total			14	0	0	0	14	0

== Honours ==
Schalke 04

- 2. Bundesliga: 2025–26

Germany U19

- UEFA European Under-19 Championship runner-up: 2026
