= Hasan Kuruçay =

Turkish footballer (born 1997)

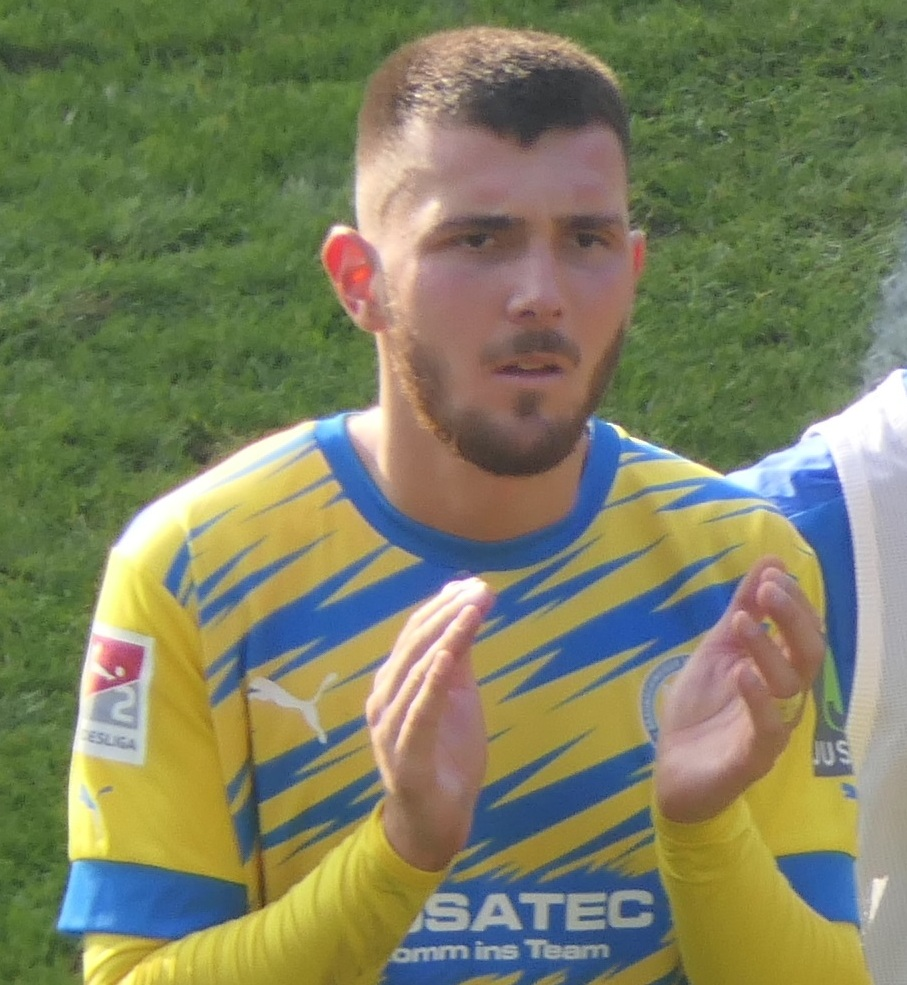
- Kuruçay with Eintracht Braunschweig in 2023

Personal information
- Date of birth: 31 August 1997 (age 29)
- Place of birth: Odense, Denmark
- Height: 1.88 m (6 ft 2 in)
- Position: Centre-back

Team information
- Current team: Schalke 04
- Number: 4

Youth career
- 2001–2011: B 1909
- 2011–2016: OB

Senior career*
Years	Team	Apps	(Gls)
2016	OB	0	(0)
2017	Næstved	9	(0)
2017	Konyaspor	0	(0)
2017	→ Anadolu Selçukspor (loan)	4	(0)
2018–2019	Marienlyst	28	(0)
2019	Florø	22	(1)
2020	Strømmen	25	(3)
2021–2022	HamKam	52	(4)
2023–2024	Eintracht Braunschweig	43	(4)
2024–2025	OH Leuven	23	(1)
2025–	Schalke 04	39	(4)

International career
2013	Turkey U17	2	(0)
2014–2015	Turkey U18	6	(2)
2015–2016	Turkey U19	3	(0)
- * Club domestic league appearances and goals as of 10 November 2026

Hasan Kuruçay (born 31 August 1997) is a professional footballer who plays as a centre-back for Bundesliga club Schalke 04. Born in Denmark, he represented Turkey at youth level.

== Club career ==
Born in Odense, Denmark, Kuruçay started his career with OB. He signed for Norwegian side Florø in February 2019, before moving to Strømmen in February 2020. In January 2021, he joined HamKam on a two-year contract. On 2 April 2022, he made his Eliteserien debut in a 2–2 draw against Lillestrøm.

On 24 January 2023, Kuruçay joined German 2. Bundesliga club Eintracht Braunschweig on a deal until June 2024.

On 6 September 2024, Kuruçay joined Belgian Pro League club OH Leuven on an initial one-year deal with the option for a further twelve months.

On 29 July 2025, German club Schalke 04 announced that they had signed Kuruçay until June 2027.

== International career ==
Kuruçay has represented Turkey at youth international level.

== Career statistics ==
As of match played 8 November 2026

Appearances and goals by club, season and competition
Club	Season	League			National cup (Note: Includes Danish Cup, Turkish Cup, Norwegian Football Cup, DFB-Pokal, Belgian Cup)		Total	
Club	Season	Division	Apps	Goals	Apps	Goals	Apps	Goals
OB	2016–17	Danish Superliga	0	0	0	0	0	0
Næstved	2016–17	Danish 1st Division	9	0	2	0	11	0
Konyaspor	2017–18	Süper Lig	0	0	0	0	0	0
Anadolu Selçukspor (loan)	2017–18	TFF 2. Lig	4	0	1	0	5	0
Marienlyst	2017–18	Danish 2nd Division	12	0	—		12	0
Marienlyst	2018–19	Danish 2nd Division	16	0	4	0	20	0
Marienlyst	Total		28	0	4	0	32	0
Florø	2019	Norwegian Second Division	22	1	2	0	24	1
Strømmen	2020	Norwegian First Division	25	3	0	0	25	3
HamKam	2021	Norwegian First Division	24	0	1	1	25	1
HamKam	2022	Eliteserien	28	4	2	0	30	4
HamKam	Total		52	4	3	1	55	5
Eintracht Braunschweig	2022–23	2. Bundesliga	16	0	—		16	0
Eintracht Braunschweig	2023–24	2. Bundesliga	27	4	1	0	28	4
Eintracht Braunschweig	Total		43	4	1	0	44	4
OH Leuven	2024–25	Belgian Pro League	23	1	3	1	26	2
Schalke 04	2025–26	2. Bundesliga	30	4	2	0	32	4
Schalke 04	2026–27	Bundesliga	9	0	2	0	11	0
Schalke 04	Total		39	4	4	0	43	4
Career total			245	17	20	2	265	19

== Honours ==
Schalke 04

- 2. Bundesliga: 2025–26
