= Christian Gomis =

Christian Gomis may refer to:

- Christian Gomis (footballer, born 1998), Senegalese football centre-back for Uthai Thani
- Christian Gomis (footballer, born 2000), Senegalese football striker for Schalke
