= Felipe Sánchez =

Argentine footballer

Personal information
- Date of birth: 7 April 2004 (age 22)
- Place of birth: Rafaela, Argentina
- Height: 1.84 m (6 ft 0 in)
- Position: Centre-back

Team information
- Current team: Santos Laguna (on loan from Schalke 04)
- Number: 25

Youth career
- 2009–2021: Atlético de Rafaela
- 2021–2023: Gimnasia LP

Senior career*
Years	Team	Apps	(Gls)
2023–2024	Gimnasia LP	30	(0)
2024–	Schalke 04	30	(0)
2024–2025	Schalke 04 II	4	(0)
2026–	→ Santos Laguna (loan)	0	(0)
- * Club domestic league appearances and goals as of 19 May 2026

Felipe Sánchez (born 7 April 2004) is an Argentine professional footballer who plays as a centre-back for Liga MX club Santos Laguna, on loan from Bundesliga club Schalke 04.

== Career ==
=== Gimnasia LP ===
Sánchez joined the youth team of Gimnasia LP in 2021. He made his professional debut for the club in a Copa Argentina match on 22 February 2023, which was lost on penalties against Excursionistas. He signed his first professional contract on 13 March 2023.

=== Schalke 04 ===
During the summer of 2024, Felipe Sanchez was scouted and attracted interest by both Italian Serie A club Atalanta and Spanish La Liga club Valencia. But on 9 July 2024, German 2. Bundesliga club Schalke 04 announced that they had signed Sánchez until 30 June 2028.

==== Loan to Santos Laguna ====
On 5 July 2026, Sánchez was loaned for a year to Mexican Liga MX club Santos Laguna.

== Career statistics ==
As of match played on 23 August 2026

Appearances and goals by club, season and competition
Club	Season	League			National cup (Note: Includes Copa Argentina, DFB-Pokal)		League cup (Note: Includes Copa de la Liga Profesional)		Continental		Other		Total	
Club	Season	Division	Apps	Goals	Apps	Goals	Apps	Goals	Apps	Goals	Apps	Goals	Apps	Goals
Gimnasia LP	2023	Primera División	26	0	1	0	2	0	3 (Note: Appearances in Copa Sudamericana)	0	—		32	0
Gimnasia LP	2024	Primera División	4	0	2	1	9	3	—		—		15	4
Gimnasia LP	Total		30	0	3	1	11	3	3	0	—		47	4
Schalke 04	2024–25	2. Bundesliga	5	0	2	0	—		—		—		7	0
Schalke 04	2025–26	2. Bundesliga	25	0	2	0	—		—		—		27	0
Schalke 04	Total		30	0	4	0	—		—		—		34	0
Schalke 04 II	2024–25	Regionalliga West	4	0	—		—		—		—		4	0
Santos Laguna (loan)	2026–27	Liga MX	5	0	—		—		—		2 (Note: Appearances in Leagues Cup)	0	7	0
Career total			69	0	7	1	11	3	3	0	2	0	92	4

== Honours ==
Schalke 04

- 2. Bundesliga: 2025–26
