= Max Grüger =

German footballer (born 2005)

Personal information
- Date of birth: 24 May 2005 (age 21)
- Place of birth: Gelsenkirchen, Germany
- Height: 1.85 m (6 ft 1 in)
- Position: Midfielder

Team information
- Current team: Schalke 04 II

Youth career
- 2008–2009: Hansa Scholven
- 2009–2011: SC Hassel
- 2011–2012: SSV Buer 07/28
- 2012–2024: Schalke 04

Senior career*
Years	Team	Apps	(Gls)
2024–	Schalke 04	27	(1)
2024–	Schalke 04 II	9	(0)

International career
2023–2024	Germany U19	7	(0)
2024–2025	Germany U20	4	(0)
- * Club domestic league appearances and goals as of 19 August 2026

Max Grüger (born 24 May 2005) is a German professional footballer who plays as a midfielder for Regionalliga West club Schalke 04 II.

== Club career ==
Grüger signed a professional contract with Schalke 04 on 6 June 2024, lasting until 2026. He made his first team debut for the club in the 2. Bundesliga in a 2–1 away win against Preußen Münster on 28 September 2024. On 23 December 2024, he extended his contract with Schalke until 2028.

== International career ==
Grüger represented Germany at under-19 and under-20 level.

== Career statistics ==
As of match played 14 August 2026

Appearances and goals by club, season and competition
Club	Season	League			DFB-Pokal		Total	
Club	Season	Division	Apps	Goals	Apps	Goals	Apps	Goals
Schalke 04 II	2024–25	Regionalliga West	2	0	—		2	0
Schalke 04 II	2025–26	Regionalliga West	4	0	—		4	0
Schalke 04 II	2026–27	Regionalliga West	3	0	—		3	0
Schalke 04 II	Total		9	0	—		9	0
Schalke 04	2024–25	2. Bundesliga	23	1	1	0	24	1
Schalke 04	2025–26	2. Bundesliga	4	0	2	0	6	0
Schalke 04	Total		27	1	3	0	30	1
Career total			36	1	3	0	39	1

== Honours ==
Schalke 04

- 2. Bundesliga: 2025–26
