= Zaid Tchibara =

German-Togolese footballer

Personal information
- Full name: Zaid Amoussou-Tchibara
- Date of birth: 21 February 2006 (age 20)
- Place of birth: Togo
- Height: 1.77 m (5 ft 10 in)
- Position: Forward

Team information
- Current team: Schalke 04 II
- Number: 26

Youth career
- 2021–2023: Bayer Leverkusen
- 2023–2025: Schalke 04

Senior career*
Years	Team	Apps	(Gls)
2024–	Schalke 04 II	12	(1)
2025–	Schalke 04	3	(0)
- * Club domestic league appearances and goals as of 8 September 2026

Zaid Amoussou-Tchibara (born 21 February 2006) is a Togolese professional footballer who plays as a forward for Regionalliga West club Schalke 04 II.

== Career ==
Tchibara signed a professional contract with Schalke 04 on 31 January 2025, lasting until 2028. He made his first team debut for the club in the 2. Bundesliga in a 2–1 home win against Karlsruher SC on 16 February 2025, coming on as a substitute in the 69th minute.

== Career statistics ==
As of match played 6 September 2026

Appearances and goals by club, season and competition
Club	Season	League			Cup		Total	
Club	Season	Division	Apps	Goals	Apps	Goals	Apps	Goals
Schalke 04 II	2024–25	Regionalliga West	1	0	—		1	0
Schalke 04 II	2025–26	Regionalliga West	5	0	—		5	0
Schalke 04 II	2026–27	Regionalliga West	6	1	—		6	1
Schalke 04 II	Total		12	1	—		12	1
Schalke 04	2024–25	2. Bundesliga	2	0	0	0	2	0
Schalke 04	2025–26	2. Bundesliga	1	0	0	0	1	0
Schalke 04	Total		3	0	0	0	3	0
Career total			15	1	0	0	15	1

== Honours ==
Schalke 04

- 2. Bundesliga: 2025–26
