= Mauro Zalazar =

Uruguayan footballer (born 2005)

Personal information
- Full name: Mauro Zalazar Martínez
- Date of birth: 13 April 2005 (age 21)
- Place of birth: Albacete, Spain
- Height: 1.75 m (5 ft 9 in)
- Position: Midfielder

Team information
- Current team: Kustošija

Youth career
- 2008–2013: Albacete
- 2013–2018: Atlético Benamiel
- 2018–2024: Granada

Senior career*
Years	Team	Apps	(Gls)
2022	Granada B	1	(0)
2024–2026	Schalke 04	1	(0)
2024–2026	Schalke 04 II	19	(2)
2026	→ Braga (loan)	0	(0)
2026–	Kustošija	0	(0)

International career
2024–2025	Uruguay U20	20	(1)
- * Club domestic league appearances and goals as of 7 August 2026

Mauro Zalazar Martínez (born 13 April 2005) is a professional footballer who plays as a midfielder for Croatian Second Football League club Kustošija. Born in Spain, he represents Uruguay at youth level.

== Club career ==
Zalazar signed a professional contract with Schalke 04 on 20 August 2024, lasting until 2028. He made his first team debut for the club in the DFB-Pokal in a 3–0 away loss against FC Augsburg on 29 October 2024, coming on as a substitute in the 73rd minute.

On 2 February 2026, he was loaned to Braga for the remainder of the 2025–26 season.

On 7 August 2026, Zalazar moved to Croatian club Kustošija.

== International career ==
Zalazar has represented Uruguay at under-20 level. In January 2025, he was named in Uruguay's 23-man squad for the 2025 South American U-20 Championship.

== Personal life ==
Mauro is the son of former Uruguay international footballer José Zalazar, and the younger brother of also footballers Kuki Zalazar and Rodrigo Zalazar, the latter of whom also played for Schalke 04.

== Career statistics ==
As of 7 AUgust 2026

Appearances and goals by club, season and competition
Club	Season	League			National cup (Note: Includes DFB-Pokal)		Total	
Club	Season	Division	Apps	Goals	Apps	Goals	Apps	Goals
Granada B	2021–22	Segunda Federación	1	0	—		1	0
Schalke 04 II	2024–25	Regionalliga West	15	2	—		15	2
Schalke 04 II	2025–26	Regionalliga West	4	0	—		4	0
Schalke 04 II	Total		19	2	—		19	2
Schalke 04	2024–25	2. Bundesliga	0	0	1	0	1	0
Schalke 04	2025–26	2. Bundesliga	1	0	0	0	1	0
Schalke 04	Total		1	0	1	0	2	0
Braga (loan)	2025–26	Primeira Liga	0	0	0	0	0	0
Career total			21	2	1	0	22	2
