= Kenan Karaman =

Turkish footballer (born 1994)

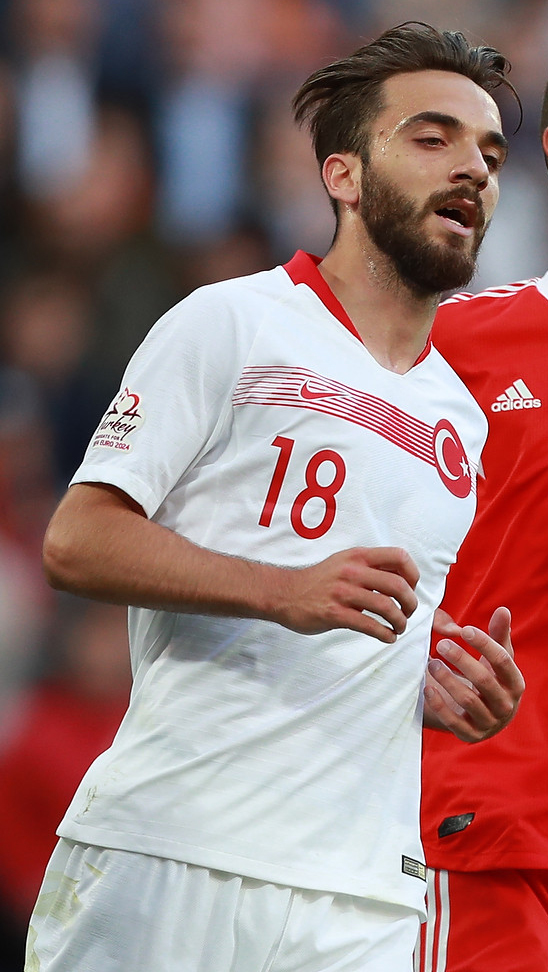
- Karaman playing with Turkey in 2018

Personal information
- Date of birth: 5 March 1994 (age 32)
- Place of birth: Stuttgart, Germany
- Height: 1.89 m (6 ft 2 in)
- Position: Forward

Team information
- Current team: Schalke 04
- Number: 19

Youth career
- 2000–2003: MTV Stuttgart
- 2003–2007: VfB Stuttgart
- 2007–2009: Stuttgarter Kickers
- 2009–2012: TSG Hoffenheim

Senior career*
Years	Team	Apps	(Gls)
2012–2014	TSG Hoffenheim II	26	(9)
2013–2014	TSG Hoffenheim	5	(0)
2014–2018	Hannover 96	87	(10)
2014–2015	Hannover 96 II	6	(2)
2018–2021	Fortuna Düsseldorf	69	(16)
2021–2022	Beşiktaş	27	(2)
2022–	Schalke 04	118	(41)

International career
2012	Turkey U18	6	(3)
2012–2013	Turkey U19	5	(0)
2012–2013	Turkey U20	5	(0)
2012–2016	Turkey U21	9	(1)
2017–2021	Turkey	31	(6)
- * Club domestic league appearances and goals as of 9 November 2026

Kenan Karaman (born 5 March 1994) is a professional footballer who plays as a forward for and captains Bundesliga club Schalke 04. Born in Germany, he played for the Turkey national team.

== Club career ==
On 29 April 2014, Karaman signed a pre-contract agreement with Hannover 96 effective 1 July 2014. Since his contract at Hoffenheim had expired, he was able to join Hannover on a free transfer and signed for three years until 2017.

On 18 May 2018, Karaman joined newly promoted Fortuna Düsseldorf from 2.Bundesliga on a free transfer for a three-year deal. He was given the number 11 shirt. He left Fortuna upon the expiration of his contract on 24 May 2021.

On 1 September 2022, Karaman signed a three-year contract with Bundesliga side Schalke 04. On 5 July 2024, he extended his contract until 2028. He was appointed team's captain under head coach Karel Geraerts at the beginning of the 2024–25 season. On 2 May 2026, he scored the only goal in a 1–0 victory over Fortuna Düsseldorf, securing his club's promotion to the Bundesliga as champions of the 2025–26 season.

== International career ==
Karaman made his senior debut for the senior Turkey national football team in a friendly 2–0 loss to Romania on 9 November 2017.

== Career statistics ==
=== Club ===
As of match played 8 November 2026

Appearances and goals by club, season and competition
Club	Season	League			National cup (Note: Includes DFB-Pokal, Turkish Cup)		Europe		Other		Total	
Club	Season	Division	Apps	Goals	Apps	Goals	Apps	Goals	Apps	Goals	Apps	Goals
TSG Hoffenheim II	2011–12	Regionalliga Süd	1	0	—		—		—		1	0
TSG Hoffenheim II	2012–13	Regionalliga Südwest	18	2	—		—		—		18	2
TSG Hoffenheim II	2013–14	Regionalliga Südwest	7	7	—		—		—		7	7
TSG Hoffenheim II	Total		26	9	—		—		—		26	9
TSG Hoffenheim	2013–14	Bundesliga	5	0	0	0	—		—		5	0
Hannover 96 II	2014–15	Regionalliga Nord	6	2	—		—		—		6	2
Hannover 96	2014–15	Bundesliga	11	0	0	0	—		—		11	0
Hannover 96	2015–16	Bundesliga	23	3	1	1	—		—		24	4
Hannover 96	2016–17	2. Bundesliga	31	6	3	0	—		—		34	6
Hannover 96	2017–18	Bundesliga	22	1	2	1	—		—		24	2
Hannover 96	Total		87	10	6	2	—		—		93	12
Fortuna Düsseldorf	2018–19	Bundesliga	21	3	1	0	—		—		22	3
Fortuna Düsseldorf	2019–20	Bundesliga	20	6	1	0	—		—		21	6
Fortuna Düsseldorf	2020–21	2. Bundesliga	28	7	1	0	—		—		29	7
Fortuna Düsseldorf	Total		69	16	3	0	—		—		72	16
Beşiktaş	2021–22	Süper Lig	25	2	2	0	5 (Note: Appearances in UEFA Champions League)	0	1 (Note: Appearance in Turkish Super Cup)	0	33	2
Beşiktaş	2022–23	Süper Lig	2	0	—		—		—		2	0
Beşiktaş	Total		27	2	2	0	5	0	1	0	35	2
Schalke 04	2022–23	Bundesliga	21	1	1	0	—		—		22	1
Schalke 04	2023–24	2. Bundesliga	29	13	2	1	—		—		31	14
Schalke 04	2024–25	2. Bundesliga	29	13	2	1	—		—		31	14
Schalke 04	2025–26	2. Bundesliga	32	14	2	0	—		—		34	14
Schalke 04	2026–27	Bundesliga	7	0	1	0	—		—		8	0
Schalke 04	Total		118	41	8	2	—		—		126	43
Career total			338	80	19	4	5	0	1	0	363	84

=== International ===
Appearances and goals by national team and year
National team	Year	Apps	Goals
Turkey
Turkey	2017	2	0
Turkey	2018	1	0
Turkey	2019	7	1
Turkey	2020	7	3
Turkey	2021	14	2
Total		31	6

Scores and results list Turkey's goal tally first, score column indicates score after each Karaman goal.

List of international goals scored by Kenan Karaman
No.	Date	Venue	Opponent	Score	Result	Competition
1	30 May 2019	New Antalya Stadium, Antalya, Turkey	Greece	2–0	2–1	Friendly
2	7 October 2020	RheinEnergieStadion, Cologne, Germany	Germany	3–3	3–3	Friendly
3	11 October 2020	VTB Arena, Moscow, Russia	Russia	1–1	1–1	2020–21 UEFA Nations League B
4	15 November 2020	Şükrü Saracoğlu Stadium, Istanbul, Turkey	Russia	1–1	3–2	2020–21 UEFA Nations League B
5	30 March 2021	Atatürk Olympic Stadium, Istanbul, Turkey	Latvia	1–0	3–3	2022 FIFA World Cup qualification
6	4 September 2021	Victoria Stadium, Gibraltar	Gibraltar	3–0	3–0	2022 FIFA World Cup qualification

== Honours ==
Beşiktaş

- Turkish Super Cup: 2021

Schalke 04

- 2. Bundesliga: 2025–26
