= Lars Kornetka =

German football manager (born 1978)

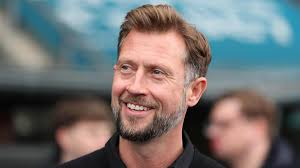

Personal information
- Date of birth: 3 January 1978 (age 48)
- Place of birth: Würselen, Germany

Team information
- Current team: Eintracht Braunschweig (manager)

Managerial career
- Years: Team
- 2007–2011: TSG 1899 Hoffenheim (analyst)
- 2011–2013: FC Schalke 04 (analyst)
- 2013–2014: FC Bayern Munich (analyst)
- 2014–2018: Bayer 04 Leverkusen (analyst)
- 2018–2020: RB Leipzig (analyst)
- 2020–2021: PSV Eindhoven (assistant)
- 2021–2022: FC Lokomotiv Moscow (head of sports and development)
- 2022–2026: Austria (assistant)
- 2026–: Eintracht Braunschweig

Lars Kornetka (born 3 January 1978) is a German professional football manager who manages Eintracht Braunschweig.

== Career ==
Kornetka started his managerial career as an analyst of German side TSG 1899 Hoffenheim in 2007. Ahead of the 2013–14 season, he was appointed as an analyst of German Bundesliga side FC Bayern Munich. Seven years later, he was appointed as an assistant manager of Dutch side PSV Eindhoven.

Following his stint there, he was appointed as head of sports and development of Russian side FC Lokomotiv Moscow. Subsequently, he was appointed as an assistant manager of the Austria national football team in 2022, helping the team achieve qualification to the 2026 FIFA World Cup. During the spring of 2026, he was appointed manager of German side Eintracht Braunschweig.

== Personal life ==
Kornetka was born on 3 January 1978. Born in Würselen, Germany, he worked as a journalist.
