= Christian Gomis (footballer, born 2000) =

Senegalese footballer

Personal information
- Full name: Christian Pierre Louis Gomis
- Date of birth: 9 August 2000 (age 26)
- Place of birth: Pikine, Senegal
- Height: 1.85 m (6 ft 1 in)
- Position: Forward

Team information
- Current team: Tenerife (on loan from Schalke 04)
- Number: 17

Youth career
- 2006–2011: CD Vícar
- 2011–2013: La Cañada Atlético
- 2013–2014: Ciudad de Roquetas
- 2015–2017: La Chaux-de-Fonds
- 2017–2018: Bejune

Senior career*
Years	Team	Apps	(Gls)
2018–2019	La Chaux-de-Fonds	24	(4)
2019–2020	Biel-Bienne	6	(1)
2020–2022	Vevey-Sports	35	(18)
2022–2024	Stade Nyonnais	63	(21)
2024–2025	Winterthur	32	(7)
2024	Winterthur II	2	(0)
2025–	Schalke 04	19	(1)
2026–	→ Tenerife (loan)	0	(0)
- * Club domestic league appearances and goals as of 1 September 2026

Christian Pierre Louis Gomis (born 9 August 2000) is a Senegalese professional footballer who plays as a forward for Segunda División club Tenerife, on loan from Bundesliga club Schalke 04.

== Club career ==
=== Winterthur ===
On 8 July 2024, Gomis moved from Stade Nyonnais to Winterthur.

=== Schalke 04 ===
On 1 September 2025, Schalke 04 announced that they had signed Gomis until 30 June 2029.

==== Tenerife (loan) ====
On 1 September 2026, Gomis was loaned to Tenerife in the Spanish second tier, with an option to buy.

== Career statistics ==
As of 1 September 2026

Appearances and goals by club, season and competition
Club	Season	League			National cup (Note: Includes Swiss Cup)		Other		Total	
Club	Season	Division	Apps	Goals	Apps	Goals	Apps	Goals	Apps	Goals
La Chaux-de-Fonds	2018–19	Swiss Promotion League	24	4	—		—		24	4
Biel-Bienne	2019–20	Swiss 1. Liga	6	1	—		—		6	1
Vevey-Sports	2020–21	Swiss 1. Liga	13	6	3	2	—		16	8
Vevey-Sports	2021–22	Swiss 1. Liga	22	12	—		2 (Note: Appearances in Swiss 1. Liga play-offs)	1	24	13
Vevey-Sports	Total		35	18	3	2	2	1	40	21
Stade Nyonnais	2022–23	Swiss Promotion League	27	14	1	1	—		28	15
Stade Nyonnais	2023–24	Swiss Challenge League	36	7	1	0	—		37	7
Stade Nyonnais	Total		63	21	2	1	—		65	22
Winterthur	2024–25	Swiss Super League	27	5	2	0	—		29	5
Winterthur	2025–26	Swiss Super League	5	2	1	2	—		6	4
Winterthur	Total		32	7	3	2	—		35	9
Winterthur II	2024–25	Swiss 1. Liga	2	0	—		—		2	0
Schalke 04	2025–26	2. Bundesliga	19	1	0	0	—		19	1
Tenerife (loan)	2026–27	Segunda División	0	0	0	0	—		0	0
Career total			181	52	8	5	2	1	191	58

== Honours ==
Schalke 04

- 2. Bundesliga: 2025–26
