= Jakob Fimpel =

German football coach

Personal information
- Date of birth: 18 March 1989 (age 37)
- Place of birth: Filderstadt, Germany

Team information
- Current team: Schalke 04 II (head coach)

Managerial career
- Years: Team
- 2022–2024: Schalke 04 II
- 2024: Schalke 04 (interim)
- 2024–2025: Schalke 04 II
- 2025: Schalke 04 (interim)
- 2025–: Schalke 04 II

Jakob Fimpel (born 18 March 1989) is a German football coach who is the head coach of Schalke 04 II.

== Career ==
On 28 March 2022, it was announced that Fimpel would replace Torsten Fröhling as Schalke 04 II manager.

On 21 September 2024, he took over Schalke 04 as head coach on an interim basis after Karel Geraerts was sacked by the club. His tenure was over after two weeks, when a new coach, Kees van Wonderen, was hired and he returned to Schalke II. On 3 May 2025, he was named interim head coach again.

== Managerial statistics ==
As of 9 October 2025

Managerial record by team and tenure
Team	From	To	Record					Ref
Team	From	To	G	W	D	L	Win %	Ref
Schalke 04 II	28 March 2022	21 September 2024	84	35	20	29	41.67	
Schalke 04	21 September 2024	5 October 2024	2	1	1	0	50.00	
Schalke 04 II	6 October 2024	2 May 2025	19	5	5	9	26.32	
Schalke 04	3 May 2025	18 May 2025	2	0	0	2	0.00	
Schalke 04 II	19 May 2025	Present	11	7	2	2	63.64	
Total			118	48	28	42	40.68	
