= 2024–25 SV Waldhof Mannheim season =

SV Waldhof Mannheim
2024–25 season
- Manager: Marco Antwerpen
- Stadium: Carl-Benz-Stadion
- 3. Liga: 15th
- Baden Cup: Quarter-finals

The 2024–25 season is the 118th season in the history of SV Waldhof Mannheim, and the club's second consecutive season in 3. Liga. In addition to the domestic league, the team is scheduled to participate in the Württemberg Cup.

== Transfers ==
=== In ===
Pos.	Player	Transferred from	Fee	Date	Source
MF	(Germany) Adrian Fein	(Germany) SC Verl	Free	16 July 2024	

=== Out ===
Pos.	Player	Transferred to	Fee	Date	Source
MF	(Austria) Angelo Gattermayer	(Austria) Wolfsberger AC	Undisclosed	16 July 2024	

== Friendlies ==
=== Pre-season ===
6 July 2024 Friendly	SC 1910 Käfertal (Germany)	0–16	(Germany) Waldhof Mannheim

13 July 2024 Friendly	Waldhof Mannheim (Germany)	1–1	(Hungary) Újpest FC
Note: The game was scheduled for 12 July but was postponed due to a storm.

17 July 2024 Friendly	Waldhof Mannheim (Germany)	5–2	(Germany) VfR Mannheim
18:30

20 July 2024 Friendly	TSG Hoffenheim II (Germany)	4–1	(Germany) Waldhof Mannheim
12:00

27 July 2024 Friendly	Waldhof Mannheim (Germany)	2–0	(Belgium) RWD Molenbeek
14:00

=== Mid-season ===
13 November 2024 Friendly	Wormatia Worms (Germany)	2–3	(Germany) Waldhof Mannheim

6 January 2025 Friendly	Hannover 96 (Germany)	0–1	(Germany) Waldhof Mannheim
			Halstenberg 23' (o.g.)

10 January 2025 Friendly	Waldhof Mannheim (Germany)	0–0	(Germany) Rot-Weiß Oberhausen
13:00

== Competitions ==
=== Overall record ===
Competition	First match	Last match	Starting round	Final position	Record							
Competition	First match	Last match	Starting round	Final position	Pld	W	D	L	GF	GA	GD	Win %
3. Liga	4 August 2024	17 May 2025	Matchday 1		19	5	6	8	20	24	−4	26.32
Baden Cup	7 August 2024	6 September 2024	First round	Quarter-finals	3	2	0	1	15	2	+13	66.67
Total					22	7	6	9	35	26	+9	31.82

Source: Competitions

=== 3. Liga ===
==== League table ====
Pos	Team	Pld	W	D	L	GF	GA	GD	Pts	Promotion, qualification or relegation
14	Alemannia Aachen	34	10	14	10	37	38	−1	44	
15	Borussia Dortmund II (Note: Reserve teams are ineligible for promotion or DFB-Pokal qualification.)	34	11	10	13	50	49	+1	43	
16	Waldhof Mannheim	34	9	12	13	38	42	−4	39	
17	VfB Stuttgart II	34	10	9	15	45	57	−12	39	Relegation to Regionalliga
18	SV Sandhausen	34	8	8	18	45	58	−13	32	Relegation to Regionalliga

Updated to match(es) played on 25 April 2025. Source: DFB
Rules for classification: 1) Points; 2) Goal difference; 3) Goals scored; 4) Head-to-head results; 5) Head-to-head away goals scored; 6) Away goals scored; 7) Play-off.

==== Matches ====
The match schedule was released on 9 July 2024.

3–4 August 2024 1	FC Ingolstadt	v	Waldhof Mannheim	Ingolstadt
				Stadium: Audi Sportpark

=== Baden Cup ===
7 August 2024 Third round	VfK Diedesheim	1–7	Waldhof Mannheim	TBD

17 August 2024 Round of 16	TSV Tauberbischofsheim	0–8	Waldhof Mannheim	TBD

6 September 2024 Quarter-finals	VfR Gommersdorf	1–0	Waldhof Mannheim	TBD
