= Steve Noode =

German footballer (born 2003)

Personal information
- Date of birth: 2 June 2005 (age 21)
- Place of birth: Yaoundé, Cameroon
- Height: 1.87 m (6 ft 2 in)
- Position: Centre-back

Team information
- Current team: Schalke 04 II

Youth career
- 2019–2021: Indomables Cameroun Académie
- 2021–2024: A.S. International Académie

Senior career*
Years	Team	Apps	(Gls)
2024–	Schalke 04	0	(0)
2025	→ SCR Altach (loan)	3	(0)
2025	→ SCR Altach II (loan)	11	(0)
2025–2026	→ Union Titus Pétange (loan)	30	(0)
- * Club domestic league appearances and goals as of 2 July 2026

Steve Noode (born 2 June 2005) is a Cameroonian professional footballer who plays as a centre-back for Regionalliga West club Schalke 04 II.

== Career ==
After playing in football academies in Cameroon, Noode signed a professional five-year contract with Schalke 04 on 20 August 2024.

On 30 January 2025, he was loaned to Austrian Bundesliga club SCR Altach until the end of the season. He made his professional debut for the club in a 1–2 home defeat against Grazer AK on 8 February 2025.

On 24 July 2025, he was loaned to Luxembourgish club Union Titus Pétange for the 2025–26 season.

== Career statistics ==
As of match played 23 May 2026

Appearances and goals by club, season and competition
Club	Season	League			Cup		Total	
Club	Season	Division	Apps	Goals	Apps	Goals	Apps	Goals
Schalke 04	2024–25	2. Bundesliga	0	0	0	0	0	0
SCR Altach (loan)	2024–25	Austrian Bundesliga	3	0	—		3	0
SCR Altach II (loan)	2024–25	Austrian Regionalliga	11	0	—		11	0
Union Titus Pétange (loan)	2025–26	Luxembourg National Division	30	0	1	0	31	0
Career total			44	0	1	0	45	0
