= FC Schalke 04 II =

- Full name: Fußballclub Gelsenkirchen-Schalke 04 e. V.
- Nicknames: Die Königsblauen (The Royal Blues); Die Knappen (The Miners)
- Founded: 1904 (club)
- Ground: Parkstadion
- Capacity: 5,000
- Executive Board: Jochen Schneider; Alexander Jobst; Peter Peters; Gerald Asamoah
- Coach: Jakob Fimpel
- League: Regionalliga West (IV)
- 2025–26: Regionalliga West, 3rd of 18
Home colours	Away colours

FC Schalke 04 II are the reserve team of German association football club FC Schalke 04. Until 2005 the team played as FC Schalke 04 Amateure.

The team has qualified for the first round of the DFB-Pokal, the German Cup, on two occasions. They currently play in the tier four Regionalliga West.

== History ==
The team first made an appearance in the highest football league in Westphalia when it won promotion to the tier three Verbandsliga Westfalen in 1964 but was relegated again in 1966. It made a return to the league in 1978 when the Oberliga Westfalen was established as the tier above the Verbandsliga but was once more relegated in 1980. It returned to the league for a third time in 1986 and played there until 1992 when a division championship took the team up to the Oberliga Westfalen.

The team played for three seasons against relegation in the Oberliga until 1995, when it dropped back to the Verbandsliga. It returned to the Oberliga again in 1997, now as a much stronger side. A league championship in the Oberliga earned the club promotion to the Regionalliga Nord in 2003 but it was relegated again immediately. Four more Oberliga seasons followed until 2008 when the team qualified for the new Regionalliga West where it has played since.

The team has played in the DFB-Pokal twice, qualifying for the first round in 1994–95 and 2001–02, going out to VfL Wolfsburg in 1994 and VfL Bochum in 2001.

== Honours ==
The team's honours:

- Oberliga Westfalen
  - Champions: 2003, 2019
  - Runners-up: (6) 1998, 1999, 2000, 2002, 2007, 2008
- Westfalenliga
  - Champions: 1992, 1997
- Westphalia Cup
  - Runners-up: 1994, 2001

== Recent seasons ==
The recent season-by-season performance of the club:

Year	Division	Tier	Position
1999–2000	Oberliga Westfalen	IV	2nd
2000–01	Oberliga Westfalen	IV	5th
2001–02	Oberliga Westfalen	IV	2nd
2002–03	Oberliga Westfalen	IV	1st↑
2003–04	Regionalliga Nord	III	16th↓
2004–05	Oberliga Westfalen	IV	3rd
2005–06	Oberliga Westfalen	IV	3rd
2006–07	Oberliga Westfalen	IV	2nd
2007–08	Oberliga Westfalen	IV	2nd↑
2008–09	Regionalliga West	IV	15th
2009–10	Regionalliga West	IV	12th
2010–11	Regionalliga West	IV	11th
2011–12	Regionalliga West	IV	11th
2012–13	Regionalliga West	IV	3rd
2013–14	Regionalliga West	IV	6th
2014–15	Regionalliga West	IV	11th
2015–16	Regionalliga West	IV	10th
2016–17	Regionalliga West	IV	16th↓
2017–18	Oberliga Westfalen	V	6th
2018–19	Oberliga Westfalen	V	1st↑
2019–20	Regionalliga West	IV	12th
2020–21	Regionalliga West	IV	8th
2021–22	Regionalliga West	IV	9th
2022–23	Regionalliga West	IV	9th
2023–24	Regionalliga West	IV	5th
2024–25	Regionalliga West	IV	14th
2025–26	Regionalliga West	IV	3rd

- With the introduction of the Regionalligas in 1994 and the 3. Liga in 2008 as the new third tier, below the 2. Bundesliga, all leagues below dropped one tier. In 2000 all clubs from the disbanded Regionalliga West/Südwest from North Rhine-Westphalia joined the Regionalliga Nord, in 2008 these clubs left the league again to join the new Regionalliga West.

↑ Promoted	↓ Relegated

== Stadium ==
Since the 2020–21 season FC Schalke 04 II play at the Parkstadion Gelsenkirchen.

== Players ==
=== Current squad ===
As of 1 September 2026

Note: Flags indicate national team as defined under FIFA eligibility rules; some limited exceptions apply. Players may hold more than one non-FIFA nationality.

No.	Pos.	Nation	Player
2	DF	FRA	Tidiane Touré
3	DF	GER	Felix Meyer
4	DF	GER	Anas Bouda
5	DF	GER	Magnus Rösner
6	DF	GER	Ben Weber
7	MF	ITA	Vincenzo Onofrietti
8	MF	GER	Emil Zeil
9	FW	GER	Gerrit Wegkamp
10	MF	KOS	Edion Gashi
11	MF	TUR	Ayman Gülaşı
13	MF	GER	Max Grüger
14	MF	GER	Andri Buzolli
15	DF	GER	Anton Donkor
17	FW	USA	Joel Imasuen
18	DF	GER	Mika Khadr

No.	Pos.	Nation	Player
19	FW	GER	Jean-Paul Ndiaye
20	DF	GER	Louis Tober
21	DF	GER	Silas Thier
23	FW	BIH	Malik Tubic
24	DF	GER	Jonas Zgorecki
25	MF	FRA	Yassin Ben Balla (captain)
26	FW	TOG	Zaid Tchibara
27	MF	GER	Tim Pfeiffer
29	MF	GER	Wesley Krattenmacher
31	GK	GER	Faaris Yusufu
32	GK	GER	Luca Happe
33	GK	GER	Max Weiland
—	DF	CZE	Tomáš Kalas
—	DF	CMR	Steve Noode

=== Out on loan ===
Note: Flags indicate national team as defined under FIFA eligibility rules; some limited exceptions apply. Players may hold more than one non-FIFA nationality.

No.	Pos.	Nation	Player
16	DF	BIH	Amar Ibrišimović (at Željezničar until 30 June 2027)

== Current technical staff ==
Position	Name
Head coach	(Germany) Jakob Fimpel
Assistant coach	(Germany) Willi Landgraf
Assistant coach	(Poland) Tomasz Wałdoch
Forward coach	(Germany) Martin Max
Goalkeeping coach	(Germany) Christian Wetklo
Athletics coach	(Germany) Markus Zetlmeisl

== Managers since 1992 ==
- (Germany) Klaus Fischer (1992–1995)
- (Germany) Klaus Täuber (1995–2002)
- (Germany) Gerhard Kleppinger (2002–2005)
- (Germany) Mike Büskens (2005–2008)
- (Germany) Sven Kmetsch (2008)
- (Germany) Markus Högner (2008–2009)
- (Germany) Oliver Ruhnert (2009–2010)
- (Germany) Michael Boris (2010–2011)
- (Germany) Bernhard Trares (2011–2014)
- (Germany) Jürgen Luginger (2014–2017)
- (Germany) Onur Cinel (2017–2018)
- (Germany) Torsten Fröhling (2018–2022)
- (Germany) Jakob Fimpel (2022–2024)
- (Poland) Tomasz Wałdoch (2024)
- (Germany) Jakob Fimpel (2024–)
