= 2025–26 2. Bundesliga =

2. Bundesliga
- Season: 2025–26
- Dates: 1 August 2025 – 17 May 2026
- Champions: Schalke 04
- Promoted: Schalke 04; SV Elversberg; SC Paderborn (via play-off)
- Relegated: Fortuna Düsseldorf; Preußen Münster
- Matches: 306
- Goals: 897 (2.93 per match)
- Top goalscorer: Noel Futkeu (19 goals)
- Biggest home win: Elversberg 6–0 Fürth; Dresden 6–0 Münster
- Biggest away win: Braunschweig 1–4 Elversberg; Hannover 0–3 Schalke; Fürth 1–4 Karlsruhe; Braunschweig 0–3 Hannover
- Highest scoring: Magdeburg 4–5 Fürth; Fürth 4–5 Magdeburg
- Longest winning run: 8 games Paderborn
- Longest unbeaten run: 13 games Darmstadt
- Longest winless run: 9 games Münster
- Longest losing run: 6 games Magdeburg
- Highest attendance: 71,157; Hertha v Schalke
- Lowest attendance: 8,341; Elversberg v Kiel
- Attendance: 8,755,307 (28,612 per match)

The 2025–26 2. Bundesliga was the 52nd season of the 2. Bundesliga. It began on 1 August 2025 and concluded on 17 May 2026.

The fixtures were released on 27 June 2025.

== Teams ==
Locations of the 2025–26 2. Bundesliga teams

=== Team changes ===
Promoted from 2024–25 3. Liga	Relegated from 2024–25 Bundesliga	Promoted to 2025–26 Bundesliga	Relegated to 2025–26 3. Liga
Arminia Bielefeld; Dynamo Dresden	Holstein Kiel; VfL Bochum	1. FC Köln; Hamburger SV	SSV Ulm; Jahn Regensburg

=== Stadiums and locations ===
Team	Location	Stadium	Capacity
Hertha BSC	Berlin	Olympiastadion	74,649
Arminia Bielefeld	Bielefeld	Schüco-Arena	27,332
VfL Bochum	Bochum	Vonovia Ruhrstadion	26,000
Eintracht Braunschweig	Braunschweig	Eintracht-Stadion	23,325
Darmstadt 98	Darmstadt	Merck-Stadion am Böllenfalltor	17,650
Dynamo Dresden	Dresden	Rudolf-Harbig-Stadion	32,249
Fortuna Düsseldorf	Düsseldorf	Merkur Spiel-Arena	54,600
SV Elversberg	Spiesen-Elversberg	Waldstadion an der Kaiserlinde	10,000
Greuther Fürth	Fürth	Sportpark Ronhof Thomas Sommer	16,626
Hannover 96	Hanover	Heinz von Heiden Arena	49,000
1. FC Kaiserslautern	Kaiserslautern	Fritz-Walter-Stadion	49,327
Karlsruher SC	Karlsruhe	BBBank Wildpark	34,302
Holstein Kiel	Kiel	Holstein-Stadion	15,034
1. FC Magdeburg	Magdeburg	Avnet Arena	30,098
Preußen Münster	Münster	LVM-Preußenstadion	14,300
1. FC Nürnberg	Nuremberg	Max-Morlock-Stadion	49,923
SC Paderborn	Paderborn	Home Deluxe Arena	15,000
Schalke 04	Gelsenkirchen	Veltins-Arena	62,271

=== Personnel and kits ===
Team	Manager	Captain	Kit manufacturer	Shirt sponsor	
Team	Manager	Captain	Kit manufacturer	Front	Sleeve
Hertha BSC	(Germany) Stefan Leitl	(Germany) Fabian Reese	Castore	CheckCars24	Sparda-Bank Berlin
Arminia Bielefeld	(Germany) Michél Kniat	(United States) Mael Corboz	Umbro	Schüco	Danne Holding
VfL Bochum	(Germany) Uwe Rösler	(Slovakia) Matúš Bero	Mizuno	Vonovia	MTEL Germany
Eintracht Braunschweig	(Germany) Lars Kornetka	(Germany) Sven Köhler	Umbro	BRAWO Group	Lease a Bike
Darmstadt 98	(Germany) Florian Kohfeldt	(Germany) Marcel Schuhen	Craft	HAIX	Suzuki
Dynamo Dresden	(Switzerland) Thomas Stamm	(Germany) Stefan Kutschke	Jako	ALL-INKL.COM	ad hoc Gruppe
Fortuna Düsseldorf	(Germany) Alexander Ende	(Germany) Florian Kastenmeier	Adidas	Targobank	Metro Chef
SV Elversberg	(Germany) Vincent Wagner	(Germany) Lukas Pinckert	Nike	HYLO	Pure Steel
Greuther Fürth	(Germany) Heiko Vogel	(Sweden) Branimir Hrgota	Puma	Hofmann Personal	Buxtrade
Hannover 96	(Germany) Christian Titz	(Germany) Enzo Leopold	Macron	Heise	Hannoversche Volksbank
1. FC Kaiserslautern	(Germany) Torsten Lieberknecht	(Germany) Marlon Ritter	Castore	Novoline	Lacalut
Karlsruher SC	(Germany) Christian Eichner	(Germany) Marvin Wanitzek	Macron	SWEG	billiger.de
Holstein Kiel	(Germany) Tim Walter	(Germany) Steven Skrzybski	Puma	Famila	Lotto Schleswig-Holstein
1. FC Magdeburg	(Germany) Petrik Sander / (Germany) Pascal Ibold	(Germany) Dominik Reimann	Hummel	Humanas	SWM Magdeburg
Preußen Münster	(Germany) Alois Schwartz	(Netherlands) Jorrit Hendrix	Jako	FIEGE	Stadtwerke Münster
1. FC Nürnberg	(Germany) Miroslav Klose	(Germany) Robin Knoche	Adidas	Toolcraft AG	Helmsauer
SC Paderborn	(Germany) Ralf Kettemann	(Germany) Felix Götze	Saller	Four 20 Pharma	Mediacom GmbH
Schalke 04	(Austria) Miron Muslić	(Turkey) Kenan Karaman	Adidas	SUN Minimeal	Hegmanns Gruppe

=== Managerial changes ===
Team	Outgoing	Manner	Exit date		Position in table	Incoming	Incoming date		Ref.
Team	Outgoing	Manner	Announced on	Departed on	Position in table	Incoming	Announced on	Arrived on	Ref.
SC Paderborn	(Poland) Lukas Kwasniok	Mutual consent	15 April 2025	30 June 2025	Pre-season	(Germany) Ralf Kettemann	20 May 2025	1 July 2025	
Hannover 96	(Germany) Lars Barlemann / (Germany) Dirk Lottner / (Germany) Christian Schulz (caretakers)	End of caretaker spell	23 April 2025	30 June 2025	Pre-season	(Germany) Christian Titz	15 June 2025	1 July 2025	
Preußen Münster	(Germany) Kieran Schulze-Marmeling (caretaker)	End of caretaker spell	28 April 2025	30 June 2025	Pre-season	(Germany) Alexander Ende	21 May 2025	1 July 2025	
Schalke 04	(Germany) Jakob Fimpel (caretaker)	End of caretaker spell	3 May 2025	30 June 2025	Pre-season	(Austria) Miron Muslić	31 May 2025	1 July 2025	
Eintracht Braunschweig	(Germany) Marc Pfitzner (caretaker)	End of caretaker spell	19 May 2025	30 June 2025	Pre-season	(Germany) Heiner Backhaus	17 June 2025	1 July 2025	
Greuther Fürth	(Germany) Thomas Kleine / (Montenegro) Milorad Peković (caretakers)	End of caretaker spell	26 May 2025	30 June 2025	Pre-season	(Germany) Thomas Kleine	26 May 2025	1 July 2025	
SV Elversberg	(Germany) Horst Steffen	Signed by Werder Bremen	29 May 2025	30 June 2025	Pre-season	(Germany) Vincent Wagner	6 June 2025	1 July 2025	
1. FC Magdeburg	(Germany) Christian Titz	Signed by Hannover 96	15 June 2025	30 June 2025	Pre-season	(Germany) Markus Fiedler	15 June 2025	1 July 2025	
VfL Bochum	(Germany) Dieter Hecking	Sacked	15 September 2025		16th	(Germany) David Siebers (caretaker)	15 September 2025		
VfL Bochum	(Germany) David Siebers (caretaker)	End of caretaker spell	6 October 2025		17th	(Germany) Uwe Rösler	6 October 2025		
Fortuna Düsseldorf	(Germany) Daniel Thioune	Sacked	6 October 2025		13th	(Germany) Markus Anfang	6 October 2025		
1. FC Magdeburg	(Germany) Markus Fiedler	Sacked	12 October 2025		18th	(Germany) Petrik Sander / (Germany) Pascal Ibold	12 October 2025		
SpVgg Greuther Fürth	(Germany) Thomas Kleine	Sacked	1 December 2025		17th	(Germany) Heiko Vogel	1 December 2025		
Holstein Kiel	(Germany) Marcel Rapp	Sacked	24 February 2026		14th	(Germany) Tim Walter	24 February 2026		
Eintracht Braunschweig	(Germany) Heiner Backhaus	Sacked	10 March 2026		15th	(Germany) Lars Kornetka	10 March 2026		
Preußen Münster	(Germany) Alexander Ende	Sacked	16 March 2026		16th	(Germany) Kieran Schulze-Marmeling (caretaker)	16 March 2026		
Preußen Münster	(Germany) Kieran Schulze-Marmeling (caretaker)	End of caretaker spell	24 March 2026		18th	(Germany) Alois Schwartz	24 March 2026		
Fortuna Düsseldorf	(Germany) Markus Anfang	Sacked	12 April 2026		14th	(Germany) Alexander Ende	12 April 2026		

== League table ==
Pos	Team	Pld	W	D	L	GF	GA	GD	Pts	Promotion, qualification or relegation
1	Schalke 04 (C, P)	34	21	7	6	50	31	+19	70	Promotion to Bundesliga
2	SV Elversberg (P)	34	18	8	8	64	39	+25	62	Promotion to Bundesliga
3	SC Paderborn (O, P)	34	18	8	8	59	45	+14	62	Qualification for promotion play-offs
4	Hannover 96	34	16	12	6	60	44	+16	60	
5	Darmstadt 98	34	13	13	8	57	45	+12	52	
6	1. FC Kaiserslautern	34	16	4	14	52	47	+5	52	
7	Hertha BSC	34	14	9	11	47	44	+3	51	
8	1. FC Nürnberg	34	12	10	12	47	45	+2	46	
9	VfL Bochum	34	11	11	12	49	47	+2	44	
10	Karlsruher SC	34	12	8	14	53	64	−11	44	
11	Dynamo Dresden	34	11	8	15	54	53	+1	41	
12	Holstein Kiel	34	11	8	15	44	48	−4	41	
13	Arminia Bielefeld	34	10	9	15	53	51	+2	39	
14	1. FC Magdeburg	34	12	3	19	52	58	−6	39	
15	Eintracht Braunschweig	34	10	7	17	36	54	−18	37	
16	Greuther Fürth (O)	34	10	7	17	49	68	−19	37	Qualification for relegation play-offs
17	Fortuna Düsseldorf (R)	34	11	4	19	33	53	−20	37	Relegation to 3. Liga
18	Preußen Münster (R)	34	6	12	16	38	61	−23	30	Relegation to 3. Liga

Source: Bundesliga
Rules for classification: 1) Points; 2) Goal difference; 3) Goals scored; 4) Head-to-head results; 5) Head-to-head away goals scored; 6) Away goals scored; 7) Play-off.
(Rules 4–6 only apply after home and away matches have been played between the tied teams.)
(C) Champions; (O) Play-off winners; (P) Promoted; (R) Relegated

== Results ==
Home \ Away	BSC	BIE	BRA	BOC	DAR	DRE	DÜS	ELV	FÜR	HAN	KAI	KAR	KIE	MAG	MÜN	NÜR	PAD	SCH
Hertha BSC	—	1–1	1–0	1–1	2–2	2–0	1–0	0–2	2–1	2–3	0–1	0–0	0–1	0–2	2–1	2–1	0–2	0–0
Arminia Bielefeld	6–1	—	3–2	1–1	2–1	1–2	5–1	2–0	1–3	0–1	0–0	4–0	2–2	2–0	1–2	1–1	2–2	1–2
Eintracht Braunschweig	1–1	1–1	—	0–2	2–2	2–1	1–0	1–4	3–2	0–3	2–0	1–0	1–1	0–3	1–2	1–1	1–2	2–1
VfL Bochum	3–2	1–0	4–1	—	3–3	1–2	0–1	2–0	2–1	1–1	3–2	2–2	2–3	2–0	1–2	1–1	0–0	2–0
Darmstadt 98	0–0	2–2	2–1	4–1	—	2–0	2–1	3–3	4–2	0–2	4–0	3–2	2–0	0–0	1–0	2–0	0–2	1–1
Dynamo Dresden	0–1	1–1	2–3	2–0	3–1	—	2–1	1–2	2–0	2–2	1–0	3–3	2–1	1–2	6–0	1–2	1–2	0–1
Fortuna Düsseldorf	2–5	1–0	1–2	2–1	0–3	3–1	—	3–1	2–1	0–2	1–1	0–0	1–2	2–1	0–0	2–3	2–1	0–2
SV Elversberg	0–3	3–1	3–1	1–1	0–0	2–2	1–0	—	6–0	2–2	2–1	3–0	1–0	1–0	3–0	1–0	5–1	1–2
Greuther Fürth	3–3	2–1	0–0	0–3	3–2	3–2	3–0	2–0	—	2–2	0–3	1–4	0–2	4–5	1–0	1–1	0–2	1–1
Hannover 96	0–3	3–1	1–0	0–0	2–3	0–0	2–1	1–1	1–2	—	1–0	3–0	3–1	3–1	3–3	3–3	1–1	0–3
1. FC Kaiserslautern	0–1	2–0	0–2	3–2	3–1	3–1	3–0	1–3	1–0	3–1	—	3–0	4–1	2–3	4–1	1–1	1–2	1–0
Karlsruher SC	2–2	4–1	2–0	1–2	2–1	3–3	1–1	2–3	3–1	1–3	2–3	—	3–1	1–0	3–2	2–1	0–4	2–1
Holstein Kiel	0–1	0–2	2–0	1–1	1–1	2–1	1–0	1–1	1–2	1–2	3–0	3–0	—	1–3	0–0	2–3	2–0	1–2
1. FC Magdeburg	1–0	0–2	0–1	4–1	1–1	1–2	2–0	0–4	4–5	1–2	0–1	1–3	3–3	—	2–0	3–0	0–1	0–2
Preußen Münster	1–2	2–3	3–1	1–1	1–1	2–2	1–2	1–1	0–0	2–2	2–3	0–2	2–1	1–3	—	2–1	1–1	0–0
1. FC Nürnberg	0–3	2–0	2–1	2–1	0–1	0–2	0–1	3–2	2–2	2–1	3–0	5–1	1–1	1–0	1–1	—	0–0	3–0
SC Paderborn	5–2	4–3	1–1	1–0	2–2	2–1	1–2	1–2	2–1	0–2	2–0	2–2	2–1	4–3	2–1	2–1	—	2–3
Schalke 04	2–1	1–0	1–0	2–1	1–0	2–2	1–0	1–0	1–0	2–2	2–2	1–0	0–1	5–3	4–1	1–0	2–1	—

Source: Bundesliga
Legend: Blue = home team win; Yellow = draw; Red = away team win.

== Relegation play-offs ==
The relegation play-offs took place on 22 and 26 May 2026.

=== Overview ===
Team 1	Agg.	Team 2	1st leg	2nd leg
Rot-Weiss Essen (3L)	1–2	Greuther Fürth (2B)	1–0	0–2

=== Matches ===
22 May 2026
20:30

Rot-Weiss Essen	1–0	Greuther Fürth
Müsel 62'	Report

Stadion an der Hafenstraße, Essen
Attendance: 18,117
Referee: Daniel Schlager
26 May 2026
20:30

Greuther Fürth	2−0	Rot-Weiss Essen
Futkeu 29'; Hrgota 47'	Report

Sportpark Ronhof Thomas Sommer, Fürth
Attendance: 16,126
Referee: Robert Schröder

Greuther Fürth won 2–1 on aggregate and therefore both clubs remained in their respective leagues.

== Statistics ==
=== Top goalscorers ===
Rank	Player	Club	Goals
1	(Germany) Noel Futkeu	Greuther Fürth	19
2	(Sweden) Isac Lidberg	Darmstadt 98	17
2	(Poland) Mateusz Żukowski	1. FC Magdeburg	17
4	(Germany) Filip Bilbija	SC Paderborn	15
4	(Switzerland) Cedric Itten	Fortuna Düsseldorf	15
4	(Germany) Marvin Wanitzek	Karlsruher SC	15
7	(Finland) Benjamin Källman	Hannover 96	14
7	(Turkey) Kenan Karaman	Schalke 04	14
7	(Italy) Mohamed Ali Zoma	1. FC Nürnberg	14
10	(Bulgaria) Lukas Petkov	SV Elversberg	13

=== Hat-tricks ===
Date	Player	Club	Against	Result
2 August 2025	(Sweden) Isac Lidberg	Darmstadt 98	VfL Bochum	4–1 (H)
19 September 2025	(Croatia) Ivan Prtajin	1. FC Kaiserslautern	Preußen Münster	4–1 (H)
19 October 2025	(Germany) Younes Ebnoutalib	SV Elversberg	Greuther Fürth	6–0 (H)
23 November 2025	(Finland) Naatan Skyttä	1. FC Kaiserslautern	Holstein Kiel	4–1 (H)
6 February 2026	(Poland) Mateusz Żukowski	1. FC Magdeburg	Greuther Fürth	5–4 (A)
13 February 2026	(Italy) Mohamed Ali Zoma	1. FC Nürnberg	Karlsruher SC	5–1 (H)
12 April 2026^{4}	(Germany) Filip Bilbija	SC Paderborn	1. FC Magdeburg	4–3 (H)
19 April 2026	(Germany) Noel Futkeu	Greuther Fürth	Darmstadt 98	3–2 (H)

^{4} Player scored four goals.

=== Clean sheets ===
Rank	Player	Club	Clean sheets
1	(Germany) Loris Karius	Schalke 04	13
2	(Germany) Tjark Ernst	Hertha BSC	11
3	(Austria) Nicolas Kristof	SV Elversberg	10
3	(Germany) Nahuel Noll	Hannover 96	10
3	(Germany) Marcel Schuhen	SV Darmstadt	10
6	(Germany) Julian Krahl	1. FC Kaiserslautern	9
6	(Germany) Dennis Seimen	SC Paderborn	9
8	(Germany) Timo Horn	VfL Bochum	8
9	(Germany) Dominik Reimann	1. FC Magdeburg	7
10	(Germany) Ron-Thorben Hoffmann	Eintracht Braunschweig	6
10	(Germany) Jonas Kersken	Arminia Bielefeld	6
