= Goldene Zeiten =

- Directed by: Peter Thorwarth
- Written by: Peter Thorwarth; Alexander M. Rümelin
- Produced by: Christian Becker; Benjamin Herrmann
- Starring: Dirk Benedict; Wotan Wilke Möhring; Wolf Roth; Alexandra Neldel; Ralf Richter
- Cinematography: Jan Fehsel
- Edited by: Anja Pohl
- Music by: Kraans de Lutin
- Release date: 2006
- Running time: 129 minutes
- Country: Germany
- Language: German

Goldene Zeiten (Out of Bounds) is a German film released in 2006. It is the last film in director Peter Thorwarth's trilogy of films set in his hometown Unna, and was preceded by Bang Boom Bang (1999) and If It Don't Fit, Use a Bigger Hammer (2002). It did not meet the box office expectations with less than 100,000 viewers in German cinemas (Bang Boom Bang attracted 460,000, If It Don't Fit, Use a Bigger Hammer 670,000). The film was released on DVD on 26 October 2006, both as a Single DVD and Double DVD Special Edition.

Dirk Benedict appears in a double role as former TV celebrity Douglas Burnett, whose vanishing fame is based on his role as the lead character in fictitious 1980s TV series John Striker, and as his German Doppelgänger Horst Müller who makes a living on impersonating Burnett at shop openings. Burnett is supposed to appear at a charity event at a local golf club, but event manager Ingo Schmitz hires the more affordable Müller instead, planning to split the pay between them. This replacement goes unnoticed by club president Jürgen Matthies whose true intentions regarding the golf club are anything but charitable. When his wife hires two Uzbek contract killers to take revenge on her adulterous husband, the situation gets out of hand eventually.
