= Bang Boom Bang =

1999 film

- Directed by: Peter Thorwarth
- Written by: Stefan Holtz; Peter Thorwarth
- Starring: Oliver Korittke; Markus Knüfken
- Release date: 26 August 1999 (Germany)
- Running time: 110 minutes
- Country: Germany
- Language: German

Bang Boom Bang – A Sure Thing (German: Bang Boom Bang – Ein todsicheres Ding) is a German comedy film from 1999. The movie is set in Unna, Westphalia. It was filmed in Unna as well as in Dortmund. Together with "If It Don't Fit, Use a Bigger Hammer" (Was nicht passt, wird passend gemacht) in 2002 and "Goldene Zeiten" in 2006 the movie forms the "Unna-Trilogie" by director Peter Thorwarth, which was named after Unna, Thorwarth's hometown.

== Plot ==
The part-time criminal Keek has lost most of the money from a bank robbery that he committed together with the now jailed Karl-Heinz "Kalle" Grabowski.

When Kalle watches a porn-movie in jail, shot by Keek's friend Franky, he sees his wife Manuela starring in the movie, Kalle goes crazy and escapes from prison. Before killing Franky, the escaped Kalle unexpectedly appears at Keek's door and demands his money.

The next day, the alcoholic "Schlucke" is forced by his boss Werner Kampmann, to break into his transport company to pretend a burglary because of insurance fraud. Schlucke, however, has talked boastfully about his plan, so that Keek sees a chance to get the money for Kalle. Together with his friend Andy, Schlucke and Ratte (another fellow criminal) break into the company. Because Keek has his thumb ripped off and locked in the safe during the safecracking attempt, Keek and Andy pull the safe out by tying it to a chain attached to Keek's car, leading to an iconic picture from a speeding camera.

The following day, Keek and Andy try to blackmail Kampmann with documents from his safe. At the airport, while trying to fetch the money, Keek and Andy meet both Kampmann and Kalle. Suddenly, Kampmann is being shot by Kalle, who is killed by a plainclothes-policeman afterwards. As it turns out later, the stolen money was already taken away by a former apprentice of Kampmann, Melanie, who moved to Mallorca with a friend in the meantime.

== Cast ==
- Oliver Korittke as Keek
- Markus Knüfken as Andreas "Andy" Fink
- Ralf Richter as Karlheinz "Kalle" Grabowski
- Sabine Kaack as Manuela Grabowski
- Diether Krebs as Werner Kampmann
- Christian Kahrmann as Mark Kampmann
- Martin Semmelrogge as Schlucke
- Heinrich Giskes as Ratte
- Alexandra Neldel as Melanie
- Jochen Nickel as Franky
- Hilmi Sözer as Hilmi
- Willi Thomczyk as Willi Rabelt
- Til Schweiger as Brown
- Ingolf Lück as Porn director Uwe
- Ellen ten Damme as Maike

== Production ==
The film was shot in Unna, Cologne and Dortmund and Dortmund Airport, which is located at city boundary of Dortmund. The budget was valued at about 5 million Deutsche Mark.

== Awards ==
Peter Thorwarth received the "Director’s Promotional Award" at the 1999 "Filmfest München". In 2000, the film was honoured with "VGF Award" at the Bavarian Film Awards.

== Other ==
Since its release on August 26, 1999, the film has been shown regularly without interruption at the UCI cinema in Bochum, currently in its 1292nd week (as of May 2024). On its 10th, 20th and 25th anniversaries, the film was shown simultaneously at prime time in all 14 screens of the UCI cinema in front of more than 2,400 guests.
