= FC Schalke 04 =

Association football club in Germany

Schalke 04
- Full name: Fußballclub Gelsenkirchen-Schalke 04 e. V.
- Nicknames: Die Königsblauen (The Royal Blues); Die Knappen (The Miners)
- Short name: S04
- Founded: 4 May 1904; 122 years ago as Westfalia Schalke
- Stadium: Veltins-Arena
- Capacity: 62,273
- CEO: Matthias Tillmann
- Head coach: Miron Muslić
- League: Bundesliga
- 2025–26: 2. Bundesliga, 1st of 18 (promoted)
- Website: schalke04.de
Home colours	Away colours	Third colours

Fußballclub Gelsenkirchen-Schalke 04 e. V., commonly known as Schalke 04 (German: [ˌʃalkə nʊl ˈfiːɐ̯]) and abbreviated as S04 (German: [ˈɛs nʊl fiːɐ̯]), is a professional sports club from the Schalke district of Gelsenkirchen, North Rhine-Westphalia. It is best known for its football team, which plays in the Bundesliga, the top flight of the German football league system, following promotion from the 2. Bundesliga in 2025–26. Other activities offered by the club include athletics, basketball, handball, table tennis, winter sports and eSports.

The "04" in the club's name derives from its formation in 1904. Schalke have been one of the most popular professional football teams in Germany, even though the club's heyday was in the 1930s and 1940s. As of September 2025, the club has 210,000 members, making it the third-largest football club in Germany and the sixth-largest club in the world in terms of membership.

Schalke have won seven German championships, five DFB-Pokals, one DFB Ligapokal, one DFL-Supercup, one UEFA Cup and two UEFA Intertoto Cups. In 1937, Schalke became the first German club to win the double. Since 2001, Schalke's stadium has been the Veltins-Arena. Schalke hold a long-standing rivalry with Ruhr neighbors Borussia Dortmund, known as the Revierderby.

== History ==
=== 1904–1927: Schalke's early years ===
1900s typical mining structure in the Ruhr, source of the Schalke nickname Die Knappen – from an old German word for "miners"– because the team drew so many of its players and supporters from the coalmine workers of Gelsenkirchen.

The club was founded on 4 May 1904 as Westfalia Schalke by a group of high school students and first wore the colours red and yellow. The team was unable to gain admittance to the Westdeutscher Spielverband (Western German Football Association) and played in one of the "wild associations" of early German football. In 1912, after years of failed attempts to join the official league, they merged with the gymnastic club Schalker Turnverein 1877 in order to facilitate their entry. This arrangement held up until 1915, when SV Westfalia Schalke was re-established as an independent club. The separation proved short-lived and the two came together again in 1919 as Turn- und Sportverein Schalke 1877. The new club won its first honours in 1923 as champions of the Schalke Kreisliga. It was around this time that Schalke picked up the nickname Die Knappen, from an old German word for "miners" because the team drew so many of its players and supporters from the coal miners of Gelsenkirchen.

In 1924, the football team parted ways with the gymnasts again, this time taking the club chairman along with them. They took the name FC Schalke 04 and adopted the now familiar blue and white kit from which their second nickname would derive, Die Königsblauen (English: The Royal Blues). The following year, the club became the dominant local side, based on a style of play that used short, sharp, man-to-man passing to move the ball. This system would later become famous as the Schalker Kreisel (English: spinning top; gyroscope). In 1927, it carried them into the top-flight Gauliga Ruhr, onto the league championship, and then into the opening rounds of the national finals.

=== 1928–1933: Rise to dominance ===
Following the club's initial success, it quickly gained in popularity, especially among the working class. In 1928, the club built a new stadium, the Glückauf-Kampfbahn, and acknowledged the city's support by renaming themselves FC Gelsenkirchen-Schalke 04. They won their first West German championship in 1929, but the following year were sanctioned for exceeding salary levels set by the league and, in an era that considered professionalism in sport to be anathema, found themselves banned from play for nearly half a year.

However, the ban had little impact on the team's popularity: in their first match after the ban against Fortuna Düsseldorf, in June 1931, the team drew 70,000 spectators to its home ground. The club's fortunes begun to rise from 1931 and they made a semi-final appearance in the 1932 German championship, losing 1–2 to Eintracht Frankfurt. The year after, the club reached the final, where Fortuna Düsseldorf proved the better side, winning 3–0.

=== 1933–1945: The championship years ===
With the re-organisation of German football in 1933 under Nazi Germany, Schalke were placed in the Gauliga Westfalen, 1 of 16 top-flight divisions established to replace the innumerable regional and local leagues, all claiming top status. This league saw Schalke's most successful decade in their history: from 1933 to 1942, the club would appear in 14 of 18 national finals (ten in the German championship and eight in the Tschammerpokal, the predecessor of today's DFB-Pokal) and win their league in every one of its eleven seasons.

The club never lost a home match in the Gauliga Westfalen in all these 11 seasons and only lost six away matches, while remaining unbeaten in the 1935–36, 1936–37, 1937–38, 1938–39, 1940–41 and 1942–43 seasons, a sign of the club's dominance.

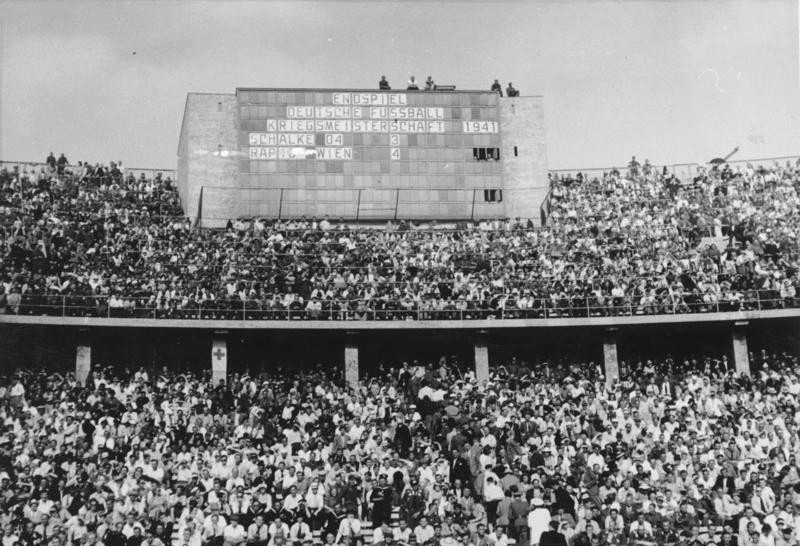
FC Schalke 04 supporters in 1941 (Score table says "Kriegsmeistershaft" - "War championship")

Schalke's first national title came in 1934 with a 2–1 victory over favourites 1. FC Nürnberg. The next year, they successfully defended their title against VfB Stuttgart with a 6–4 win. The club missed the 1936 final, but would make appearances in the championship match in each of the next six years, coming away victorious in 1937, 1939, 1940 and 1942. Three of those national finals were against Austrian teams – Admira Wien, Rapid Wien and First Vienna – which played in Germany's Gauliga Ostmark after Austria's incorporation into the Reich through the 1938 Anschluss.

Die Königsblauen also made frequent appearances in the final of the Tschammerpokal, but had less success there. They lost the inaugural Tschammerpokal 0–2 to 1. FC Nürnberg in 1935. They also made failed appearances in the 1936, 1941, and 1942 finals with their only victory coming in 1937 against Fortuna Düsseldorf.

Over a dozen seasons, from 1933 to 1945, Schalke won 162 of 189 Gauliga matches, drawing 21 and losing only 6. Within this period, they scored 924 goals and conceded just 145. From 1935 to 1939, they did not lose a single league match. The club's dominance throughout this period led them to be held up for propaganda purposes by the Nazi regime as an example of "new Germany".

=== 1945–1959: Football after World War II ===
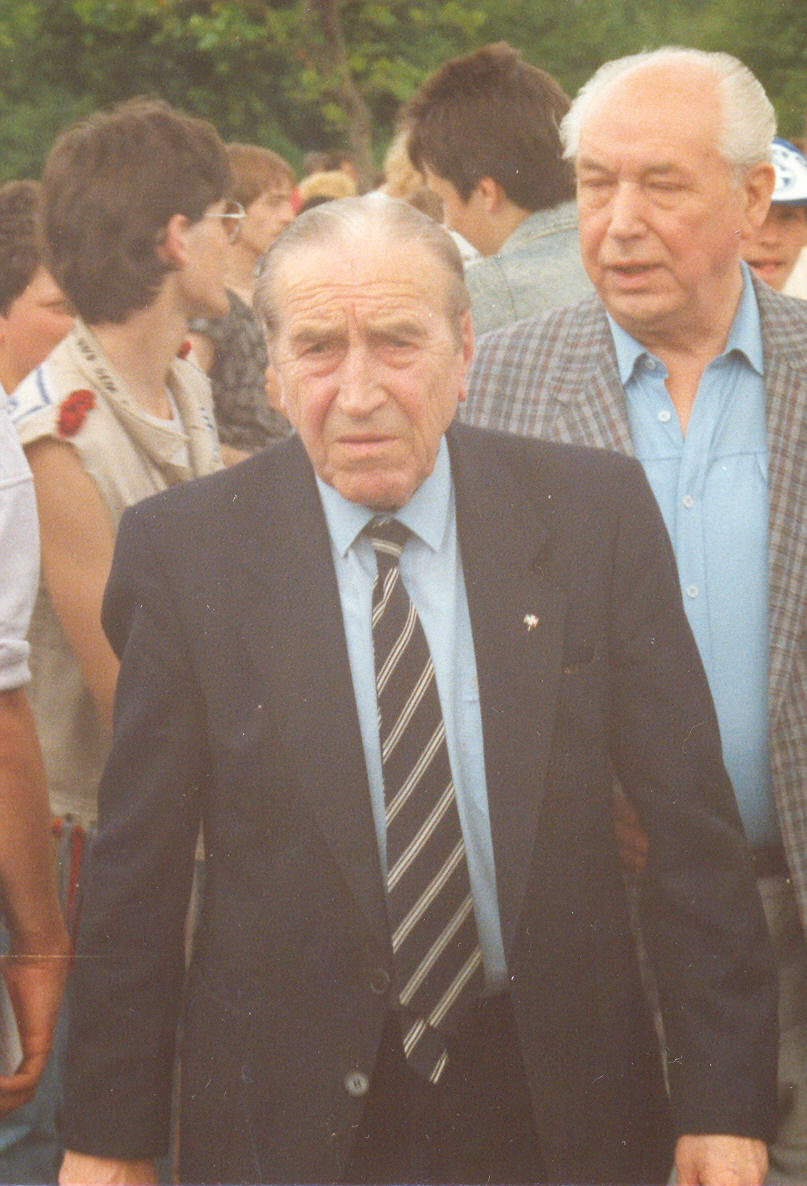
Commonly regarded as the greatest S04 player of all time alongside Fritz Szepan, Ernst Kuzorra is also commonly regarded as one of the greatest German forwards and led S04 to become the dominant team in German football winning six German championships and one DFB-Pokal from 1934 to 1942. Ernst Kuzorra was one of the main axes of what became known as the "Schalker Kreisel; a system that used quick and short passing", to confuse and overwhelm the opponent.

With Germany in chaos towards the end of World War II, Schalke played just two matches in 1945. They resumed regular play following the war and, for a few years, continued to compete as a strong side. They set a record in a national championship round match with a 20–0 win against SpVgg Herten, but that spoke more to the weakened condition of German football than to the ability of the team. Schalke's play fell off, and they only finished sixth in the new Oberliga West in 1947. Within two years, they slipped to 12th place.

It would take Schalke until the mid-1950s to recover their form. They finished third in a tight three-way race for the 1954 Oberliga West title, decided on the last day of the season. The following year, they appeared in the DFB-Pokal final, where they lost 2–3 to Karlsruher SC. The club's next, and to date last, German championship came in 1958 with a 3–0 victory over Hamburger SV. The strong fanbase of the club is as well documented in a local church, St. Joseph, in Gelsenkirchen. It was renovated shortly after the 1958 victory, where one of the glass windows shows Aloysius Gonzaga with a football and the dress and colours of Schalke.

=== 1960–2000: Entry to the Bundesliga and the Euro Fighters ===
Schalke continued to play well, having several top four finishes in the years leading up to the 1963 formation of the Bundesliga, West Germany's new federal, professional league. Those results earned them selection as 1 of 16 clubs admitted to the top-flight league.

Their first years in the Bundesliga were difficult. In 1964–65, they escaped relegation only through the expansion of the league to 18 teams. A number of finishes at the lower end of the league table followed, before a marked improvement in 1971–72, culminating in a second-place finish to Bayern Munich and after having led the league for much of the season. In the same season, Schalke won the DFB-Pokal for the second time in its history.

Despite their improved results, the seeds of a major reversal had already been sown. A number of the team's players and officials were accused of accepting bribes as part of the widespread Bundesliga scandal of 1971. Investigation showed that Schalke had deliberately played to lose their 17 May, 28th-round match against Arminia Bielefeld, 0–1. As a result, several Schalke players were banned for life, including three – Klaus Fischer, "Stan" Libuda and Klaus Fichtel – who regularly played for the West Germany national team at the time.

Even though the penalties were later commuted to bans ranging from six months to two years, the scandal had a profound effect on what might have possibly become one of the dominant German teams of the 1970s. In 1973, the club moved to the Parkstadion, newly built for the 1974 FIFA World Cup and having a capacity of 70,000 spectators. In the wake of the scandal, the club's performance was uneven. They managed another second-place result in 1976–77, finishing just one point behind champions Borussia Mönchengladbach.

In the early 1980s, Die Knappen ran into trouble and were relegated to the second division of the Bundesliga for the 1981–82 season and, after promotion, again in 1983–84. They returned to the top flight in 1984 but were relegated once more to the second tier in 1988. They returned to the Bundesliga in the 1991–92 season and stayed in the top flight until 2021.

FC Schalke 04 starting line-up in their victorious 1997 UEFA Cup Final.

The club earned their first honours since the DFB-Pokal win of 1972 with a victory in the final of the 1996–97 UEFA Cup over Inter Milan on penalties. Coached by the Dutch coach Huub Stevens, the 1997 Schalke squad earned the nickname "Euro Fighters", which is still in use among fans. Stevens, who was widely unknown in Germany at the time, quickly earned himself a cult following among the Schalke supporters.

Stevens successfully implemented a system of rigid discipline, especially in the defence. His motto "Die Null muß stehen" (in English, "It has to read nil"), which emphasized his importance on his side not conceding any goals, has found its way into everyday language in Germany.

=== 2000–2019: Top-table mainstay, European semi-final ===
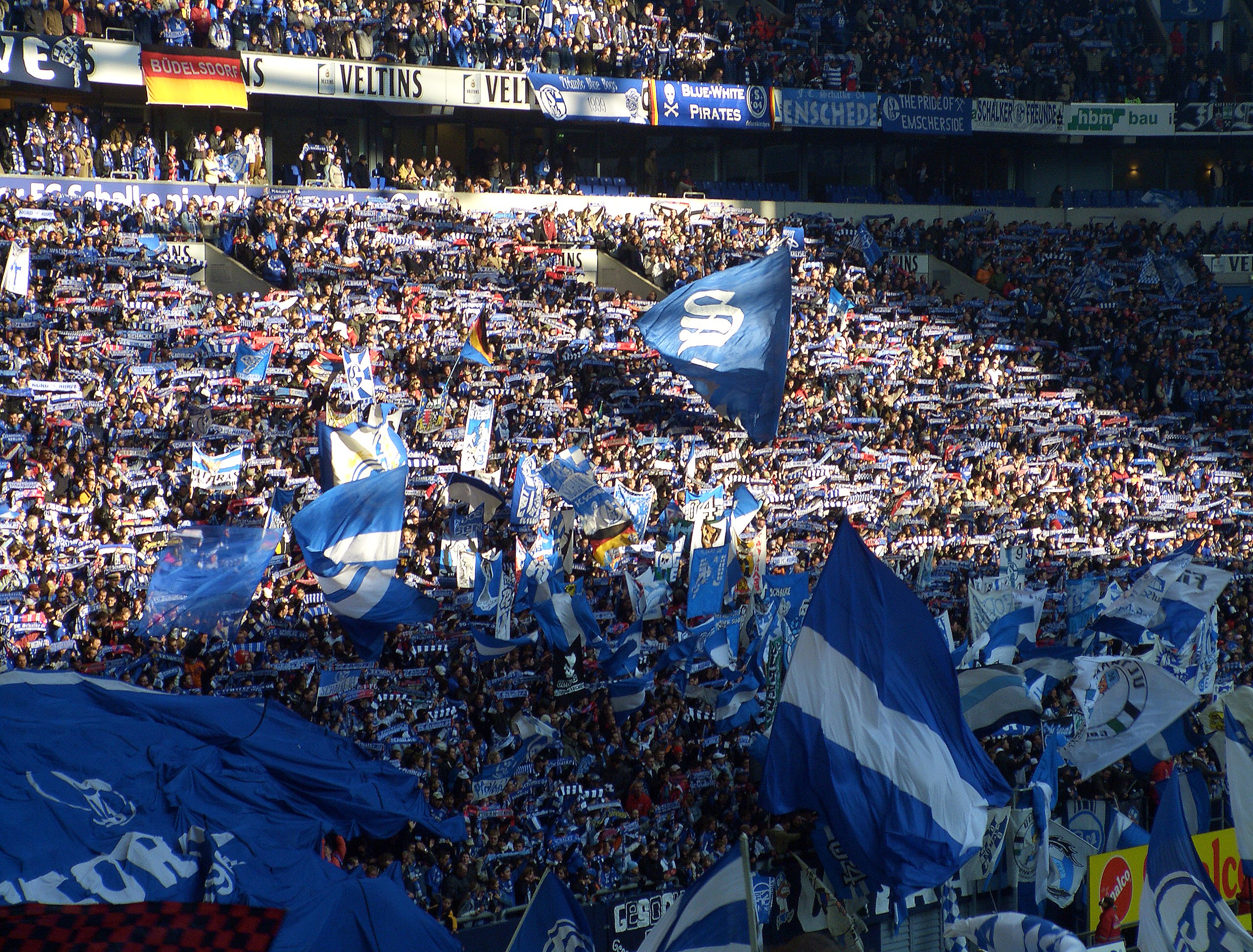
Fans displaying their colours at the Veltins-Arena

During the 1990s and early 2000, the club underwent a transformation into a modern, commercial sports organization and established itself as one of the dominant teams of the Bundesliga. Schalke won consecutive DFB-Pokals in 2000–01 and 2001–02, and earned second-place finishes in the Bundesliga in 2000–01, 2004–05 and 2006–07. The 2000–01 season finish was heartbreaking for Schalke's supporters as it took a goal in the fourth minute of injury time by Bayern Munich away to Hamburger SV to snatch the title from Die Königsblauen.

Schalke finished in second place in 2005, a result that led to Schalke making its second appearance in the UEFA Champions League. There, Schalke finished in third place during the group stage and continuing into the UEFA Cup, where they were eliminated by the eventual winners Sevilla in the semi-finals. In 2005–06, Schalke finished in fourth place in the Bundesliga, narrowly missing out on a Champions League spot. In 2006–07, Schalke came agonizingly close to their first-ever Bundesliga title, finishing runners-up for the third time in seven seasons. They led much of the campaign, but a 2–0 away loss to rivals Borussia Dortmund on the penultimate matchday left them second, just two points behind VfB Stuttgart.

In the 2007–08 season, Schalke progressed past the Champions League group stage for the first time and advanced to the quarter-finals after defeating Porto on penalties in the round of 16. They were eliminated by Barcelona in the quarter-finals, losing both home and away matches 0–1.

On 9 October 2006, Russian oil company Gazprom became the club's new sponsor. The company stated it expected to invest as much as €125 million in the club over a five-and-a-half-year period. Gazprom's sponsorship has been seen by some analysts as a politically motivated attempt to buy friendship in Germany. Within this sponsorship, Schalke 04 and Zenit Saint Petersburg signed a "partnership agreement"; both clubs intended to work closely on improving football-related issues.

On 13 April 2008, the club announced the dismissal of manager Mirko Slomka after a heavy defeat at the hands of Werder Bremen and elimination from the Champions League. Former players Mike Büskens and Youri Mulder were put in charge of the first team on an interim basis. For the 2008–09 Bundesliga season, Schalke signed a new head coach, Fred Rutten, previously of Twente. Rutten signed a contract running until June 2010. In March 2009, Rutten was sacked, and, once more, Mike Büskens, Youri Mulder and Oliver Reck took over the helm.

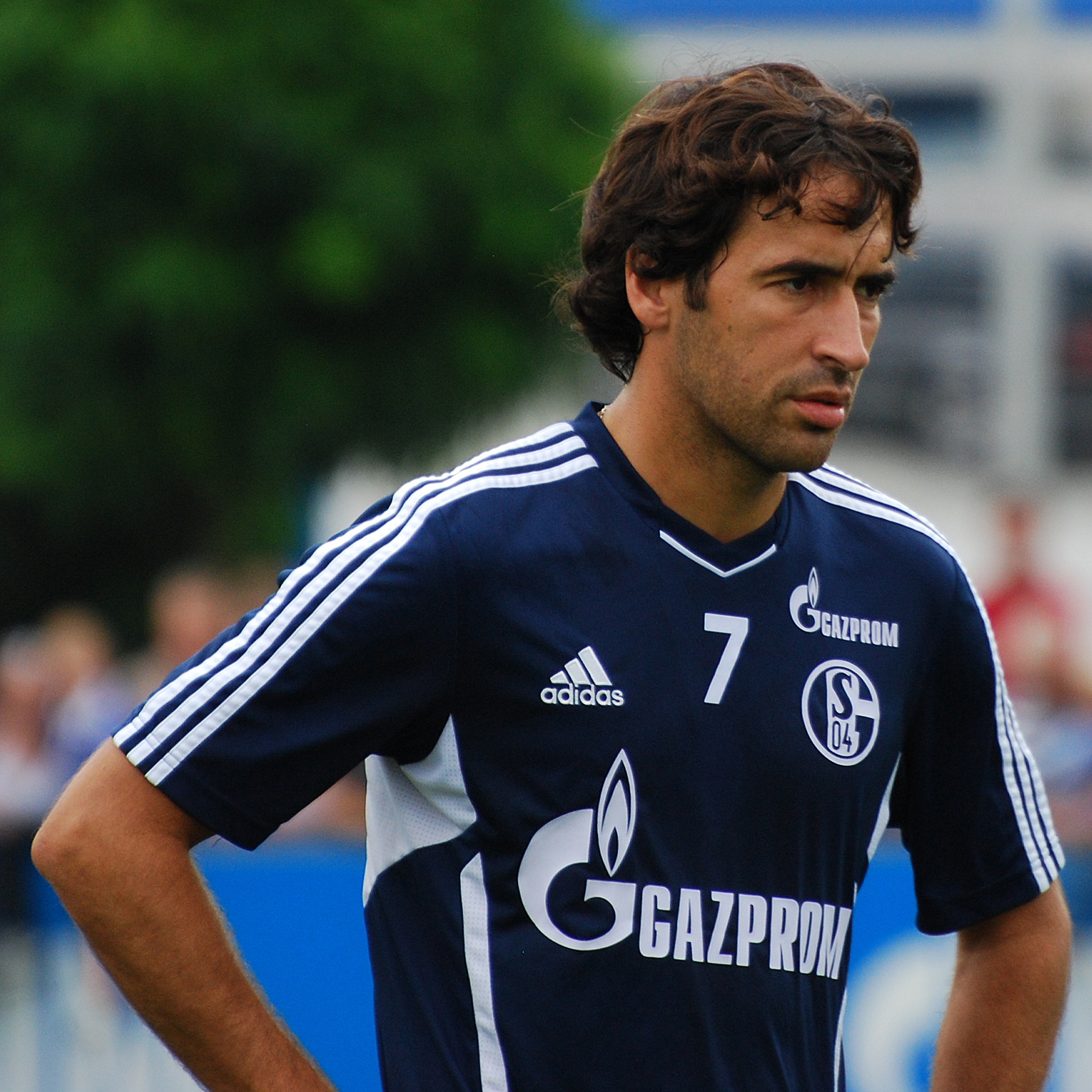
Raúl, then all-time top goalscorer in European club competitions, played for Schalke from 2010 to 2012

On 1 July 2009, Felix Magath, who had led VfL Wolfsburg to the top of the table in the Bundesliga, became head coach and general manager of the Königsblauen. The appointment of Magath as manager coincided with a multimillion-euro spending spree, allowing Schalke to acquire internationally known forwards Klaas-Jan Huntelaar and Raúl. Magath's tenure at the club was initially successful, seeing the side score a lot of goals in the first few months of the season, though defensive frailties and Magath's questionable squad selection had made him unpopular with Schalke supporters by December 2010.

On 16 March 2011, Magath was sacked, and replaced with Ralf Rangnick, who previously, between 2004 and 2005, had a brief spell being in charge of the team. Within just weeks of his appointment, Rangnick masterminded a 5–2 victory over Inter Milan at the San Siro during the quarter-finals of the Champions League. Schalke advanced to the semi-final where they lost 2–0 to Manchester United in the first leg and 4–1 in the second leg. However, Schalke 04 managed to win the 2010–11 DFB-Pokal after thrashing MSV Duisburg 5–0. On 1 June 2011, Schalke's captain, Manuel Neuer, made his move to Bayern Munich.

On 22 September 2011, Ralf Rangnick announced his immediate resignation as head coach of Schalke 04 due to long-term exhaustion. Assistant coach Seppo Eichkorn coached the team as interim manager until the appointment of Huub Stevens on 27 September 2011. Stevens' contract was to run until 30 June 2013.

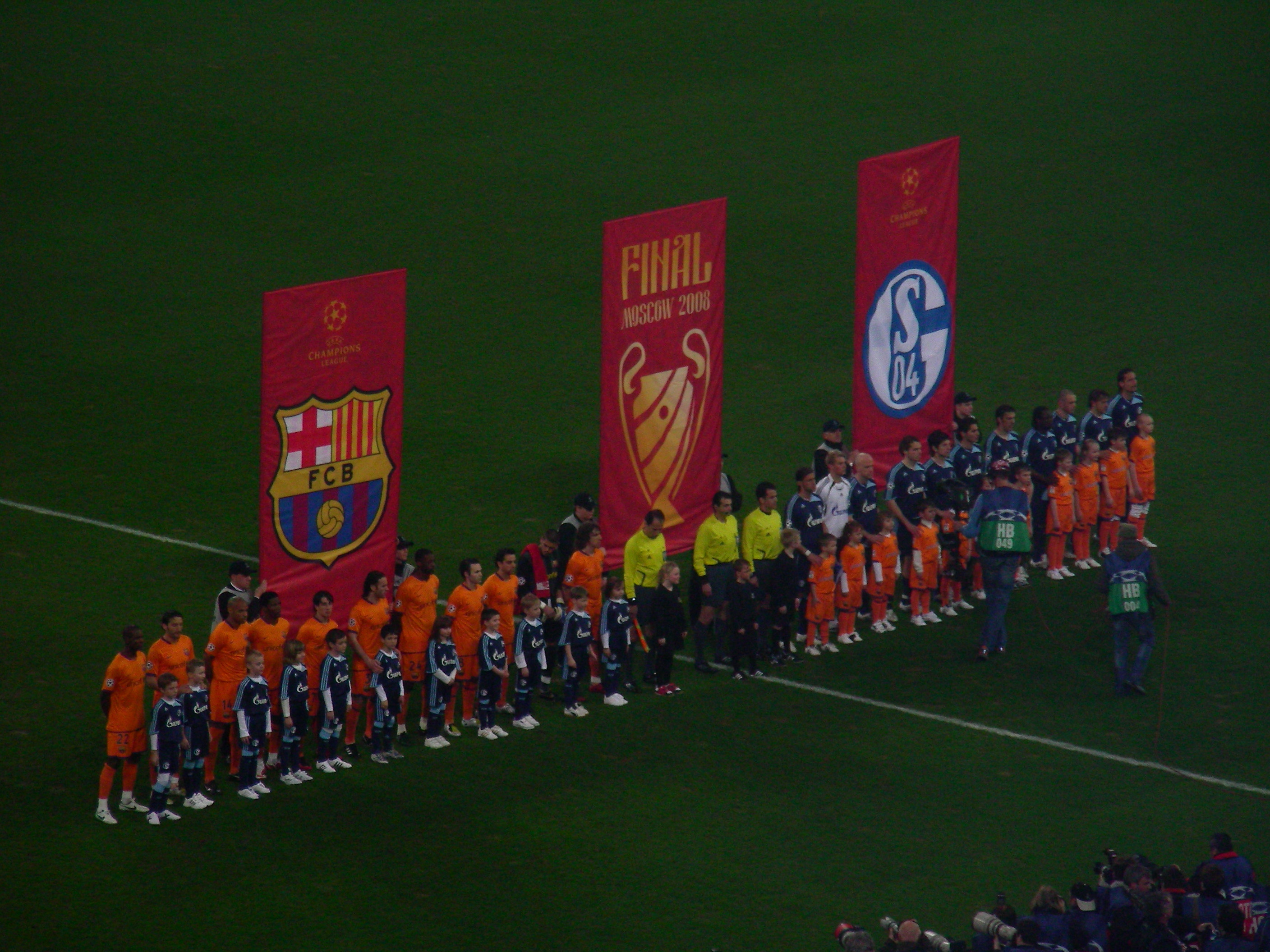
FC Schalke 04 in the UEFA Champions League line-up against FC Barcelona

Despite having legendary status among Schalke supporters, Stevens's return to Schalke was met with some scepticism, as fans feared that Stevens, who coached Schalke to the 1997 UEFA Cup win with a rigidly defensive system, could abandon Rangnick's system of attacking play in favour of returning to his 1997 defensive antics. The doubts of the supporters proved unfounded. Although Schalke played a somewhat inconsistent season, they reached third place in the Bundesliga and therefore direct qualification for the UEFA Champions League.

Schalke had an excellent start to the 2012–13 Bundesliga season, and worked their way to second place in the league by November, just behind Bayern Munich. On 20 October, Schalke traveled to Borussia Dortmund for matchday 8, and defeated the home side 2–1 to secure their first league Revierderby win since February 2010 while securing a Champions League place by finishing in fourth place. In the 2013–14 UEFA Champions League group stage, Schalke's opponents were FCSB, FC Basel and Chelsea. Schalke ultimately finished the group stage in second place, behind Chelsea, and was eliminated in the round of 16 by Real Madrid CF.

The most prominent Schalke addition was the arrival of Kevin-Prince Boateng from Milan. After a disappointing first round of the 2013–14 Bundesliga that saw Schalke in seventh place in the Bundesliga table, as well as an early exit from the 2013–14 DFB-Pokal in the first knockout round, the club played their most successful second half of the season in club history. The season was marked by numerous injuries to key squad players, including Jefferson Farfán and Klaas-Jan Huntelaar, for almost the entire season. It also led to performance related discussions about head coach Jens Keller. Partially, Schalke fielded up to ten young players with potential who played in the Schalke youth system throughout the season. Among the most promising young player discoveries of the 2013–14 season were Max Meyer and Leon Goretzka. The young Schalke squad won 11 out of 17 matches, totaling 36 points. At the end of the 2013–14 season, the club finished in third place in the Bundesliga table to qualify for their third-straight UEFA Champions League appearance, a feat Schalke had never before achieved.

On 7 October 2014, after a 1–2 defeat to 1899 Hoffenheim and after amassing just eight points from seven matches, Keller was sacked and succeeded by Roberto Di Matteo.

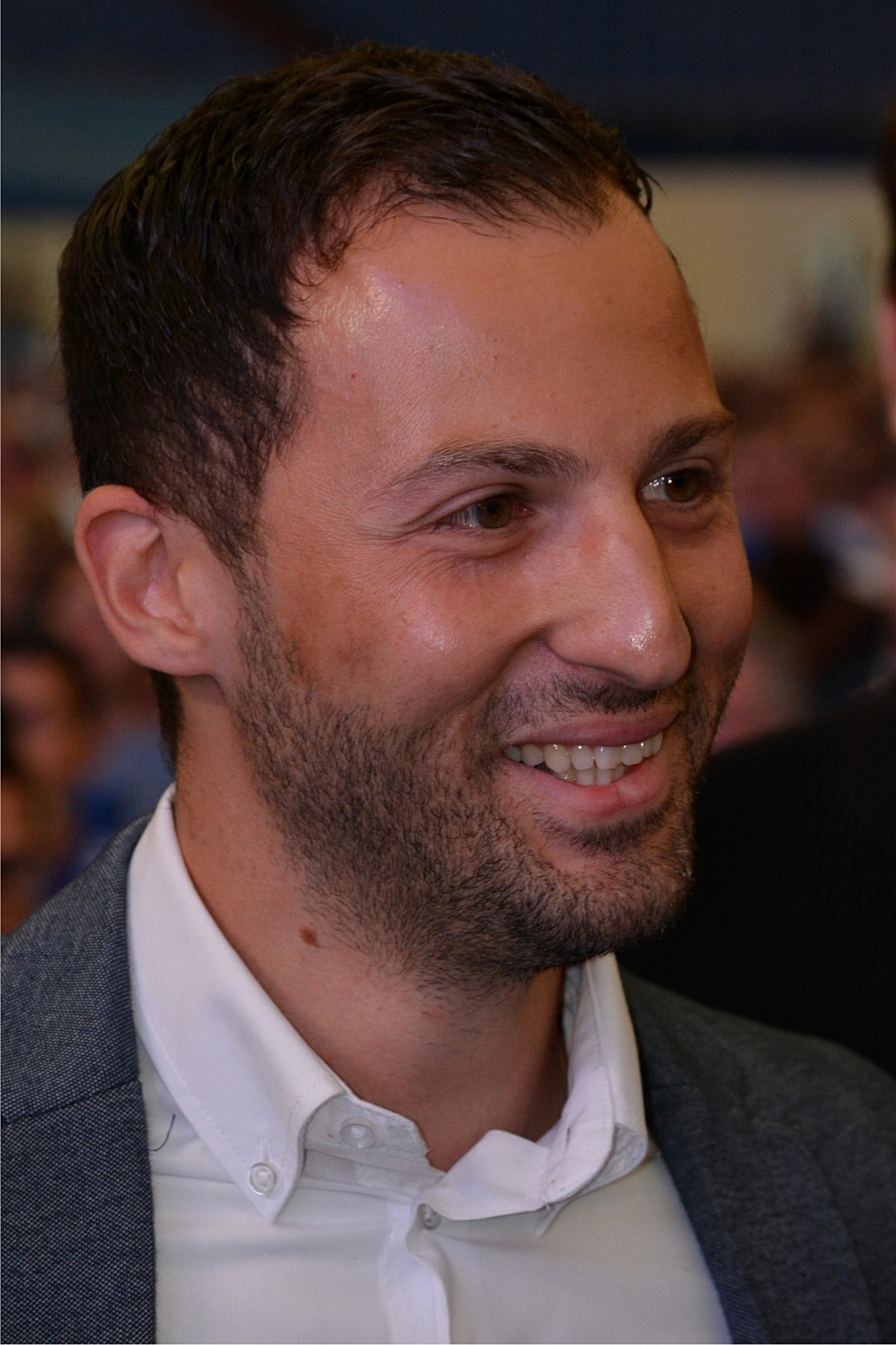
Domenico Tedesco was the youngest coach in Schalke's club history.

In the 2014–15 UEFA Champions League, Schalke 04 finished second in a group with Chelsea, Sporting CP and Maribor. Later on, they played against the reigning champion Real Madrid again in the round of 16, where they lost the first leg at home 0–2, but they won 4–3 at the Santiago Bernabéu Stadium. After finishing sixth in the 2014–15 season, the club announced the resignation of head coach Roberto Di Matteo on 26 May 2015. Schalke 04 then played in the Europa League, in the 2015–16 and 2016–17 seasons, and were eliminated by Shakhtar Donetsk and Ajax respectively.

Starting with the 2017–18 season, Domenico Tedesco took over the managerial spot for Schalke 04. At the end of the season, he led the team to finish as runners-up to Bayern Munich. On 29 July 2018, the team's captain, Benedikt Höwedes, decided to leave after more than ten years at the club.

=== 2019–2020: Financial crisis ===
In the 2018–19 UEFA Champions League, Schalke 04 lost 2–10 on aggregate to Manchester City in the round of 16. Two days later, on 14 March 2019, Tedesco was sacked. Huub Stevens and Mike Büskens took over as caretaker managers. On 9 May 2019, David Wagner was appointed as head coach of Schalke 04 on a three-year contract until 30 June 2022.

Schalke was hit particularly hard by the COVID-19 pandemic, and in April 2020 the club said that it was threatened by bankruptcy. Against the backdrop of a worsened financial situation caused by a high level of debt and a decrease in revenue related to restrictions put in place to combat the COVID-19 pandemic, the club decided to introduce a player salary cap of €2.5 million per year.

In the second half of the 2019–20 season, Schalke set a new club record of 16 league games without a win between 25 January and 27 June 2020. Despite this losing streak, Wagner remained as manager, with Clemens Tönnies stepping down from his role as the chairman of Schalke's supervisory board after 19 years in service instead.

=== 2020–present: Relegations and growing financial troubles ===
Schalke started with significant difficulties into the 2020–21 season. After 8–0 and 4–0 losses away at the hands of Bayern Munich and RB Leipzig and a 1–3 loss at home against Werder Bremen, Schalke was last in the league table after three games, with one goal scored and fifteen conceded. After only two match days, Schalke dismissed David Wagner as head coach on 27 September in the aftermath of the loss against Bremen. At 1.08 average points per game, Wagner was then the lowest-scoring head coach in Schalke's recent history.

Three days later, Manuel Baum was nominated as Wagner's successor, with Naldo, a former Schalke player, as assistant coach. Baum, who had taken over from Wagner at a winless streak of 18 games, was unable to win a single Bundesliga game between the 3rd and 12th match days, and was dismissed ahead of the 13th match day against Arminia Bielefeld. Huub Stevens once again returned as head coach, beginning his fourth tenure. Baum's tenure had brought the winless streak up from 18 to 28 Bundesliga games, bringing Schalke to the brink of breaking the all-time record of 31 winless games, set by SC Tasmania 1900 Berlin in the 1965–66 season. Stevens did not change Schalke's fortunes in his first game, losing the home game against Arminia Bielefeld, themselves in 16th place and thus threatened by relegation, with a 0–1 scoreline.

On 27 December 2020, Schalke 04 announced that they signed a contract with Swiss manager Christian Gross to be the head coach of the club until the end of the season, making him the fourth head coach for Schalke 04 during the 2020–21 season. Under Gross, Schalke's negative streak continued with a 3–0 loss to Hertha BSC, marking the 30th consecutive winless game, a losing streak of 358 days. On 9 January 2021 Schalke finally recorded a victory over 1899 Hoffenheim, which meant they avoided matching Tasmania Berlin's record. It remained Schalke's only victory under Gross, who was sacked as head coach after just eleven matches on 28 February 2021, following losses against rival Borussia Dortmund (0–4) and VFB Stuttgart (1–5). Alongside Gross, sporting director Jochen Schneider, team coordinator Sascha Riether, assistant coach Rainer Widmayer and fitness coach Werner Leuthard were also relieved of their duties. At 0.45 average points per game, Gross was the least successful head coach at Schalke since Karl-Heinz Marotzke in 1967.

On 2 March 2021, Dimitrios Grammozis was announced as new head coach for Schalke 04. Grammozis started with a scoreless draw against Mainz 05, but his team was unable to collect any points in the two following matches, which were lost 5–0 against VfL Wolfsburg and 3–0 against Borussia Mönchengladbach. Schalke did not score a goal in the first three matches under Grammozis, a joined negative record for the club (Helmut Schulte in 1992–93 and Markus Weinzierl in 2016–17 also waited for the first goal until their fourth match as head coach for Schalke). Against Borussia Mönchengladbach, Schalke conceded its fifth own goal of the season, yet another negative record.

Relegation to the 2. Bundesliga was confirmed on 20 April 2021, as Schalke 04 lost 1–0 to Arminia Bielefeld, which led to riots by Schalke supporters.

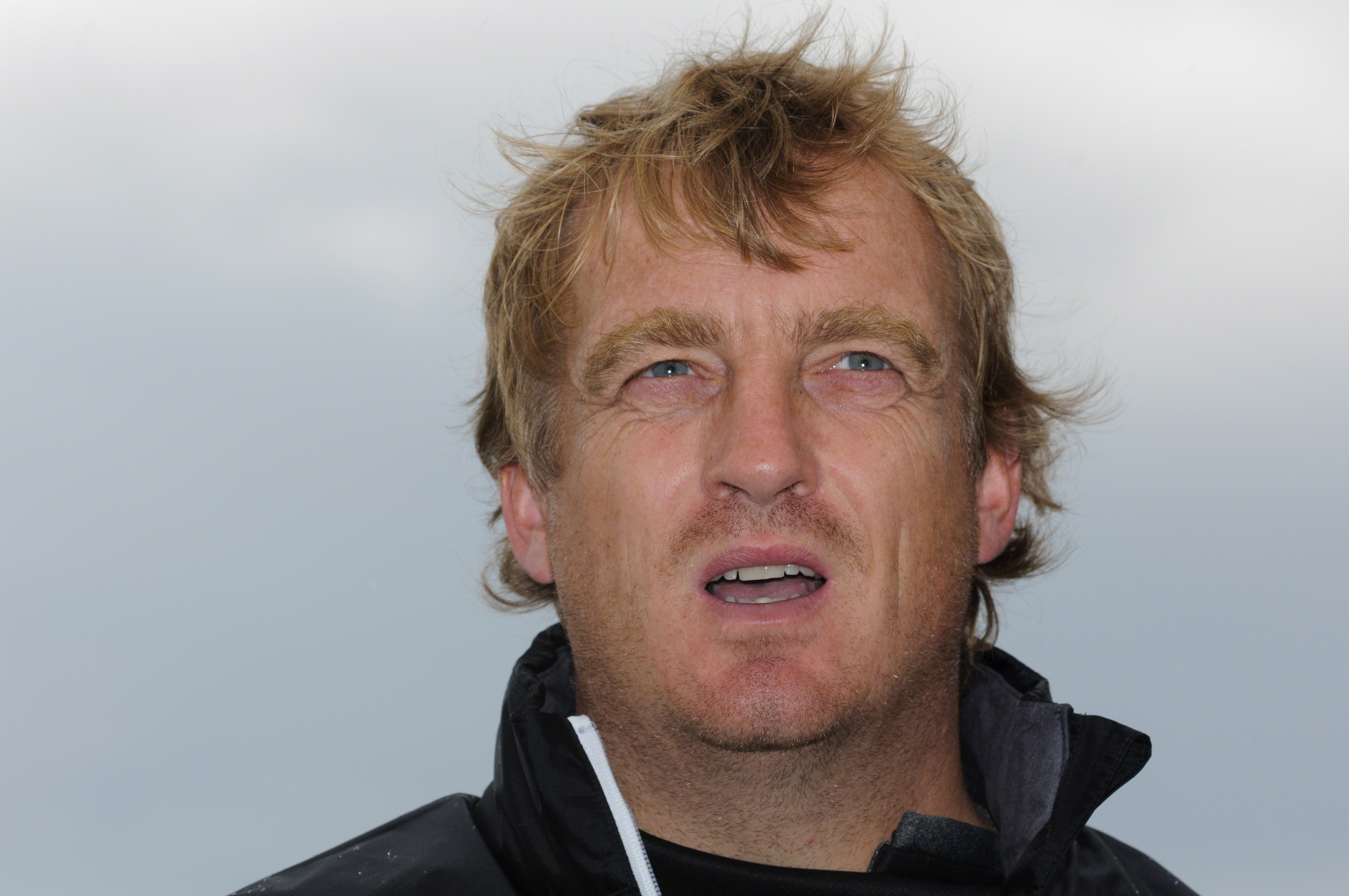
Mike Büskens led Schalke back to the Bundesliga in the 2021–22 season.

On 28 February 2022, following Russia's invasion of Ukraine, Schalke cancelled their contract with main sponsor Gazprom, further straining the club's financial situation. Grammozis was sacked as head coach on 6 March 2022, as promotion back to the Bundesliga appeared uncertain. He was replaced by Mike Büskens as caretaker manager until the end of the season. Schalke recovered under Büskens, winning eight of the remaining nine matches. The club secured promotion on 7 May 2022, following a 3–2 victory over FC St. Pauli that guaranteed a top-two finish in the 2. Bundesliga. Fans invaded the pitch in celebration. One week later Schalke won the 2. Bundesliga in dramatic fashion after a 88th-minute winner by Simon Terodde defeating 1. FC Nürnberg 2–1.

At the end of the 2021–22 season, Büskens moved back to the position of assistant coach. On 7 June 2022, Schalke appointed Frank Kramer as head coach. As a result of the club's financial problems, most of the players who were essential for the success in the previous season, like Ko Itakura, could not be kept, and Schalke struggled to be competitive at the beginning of the 2022–23 season. Following a series of losses, including a 1–5 against Hoffenheim, Kramer was relieved of his duties on 19 October 2022. At the time, Schalke was 17th in the Bundesliga after ten matchdays. Matthias Kreutzer took over as caretaker manager. A week after Kramer's dismissal, on 26 October 2022, sporting director Rouven Schröder also announced his instant resignation.

On 27 October 2022, Thomas Reis was named as Schalke's new head coach. The first match under Reis, against SC Freiburg, was lost 0–2, marking Schalke's seventh consecutive loss. After the game, commentators like Huub Stevens praised the team for its better organization, compared to previous matches. Schalke finished the first half of the 2022–23 Bundesliga season in 18th and last position in the table, with just nine points to their name. Following a 1–6 loss against RB Leipzig on match day 17, the club noticeably improved, especially in the defense. Between match days 18 and 21, Schalke played 0–0 four times in a row, a new Bundesliga record. The following two matches were won, and on 4 March 2023, Schalke left the last place in the table for the first time since October 2022.

On 19 February 2023, four people were seriously injured when a group of about 100 people, assumed to be supporters of Schalke's rivals Rot-Weiss Essen and Borussia Dortmund, attacked a group of Schalke supporters with baseball bats and screwdrivers. The incident sparked fears over the upcoming derby against Dortmund. This came less than three weeks after the police had uncovered a possible plot by radical Dortmund supporters, who had tried to hide razor blades behind stickers in the stadium ahead of Dortmund's match against Mainz. In 2014, the police had warned of a similar danger ahead of the derby, after razor blades were found in the stadium hidden behind anti-Schalke stickers. On 11 March 2023, in the 100th derby between the two clubs, Schalke played 2–2 against Borussia Dortmund, who were in second place at the time. This ended Dortmund's streak of eight wins in a row. The police called the match "extremely peaceful", which they attributed to the successful police operation. Media reports noted that several people had been injured by illegal pyrotechnics, with one woman suffering an eye injury. At least one man was taken to the hospital after an intoxicated supporter of the opposing team had bitten off his earlobe. On the final match-day of the 2022–23 season, Schalke lost 4–2 against RB Leipzig. They finished 17th in the league table, and were relegated again to the 2. Bundesliga.

After four defeats in the first seven games of the 2023–24 2. Bundesliga season, head coach Thomas Reis was sacked on 27 September 2023. On 8 October 2023, Karel Geraerts was appointed as his successor, with a contract until June 2025. Schalke finished the first half of the season in 14th position, three points ahead of the relegation spots.

On 3 January 2024, Schalke appointed Marc Wilmots as sporting director, after sacking Peter Knäbel. For Wilmots, who was one of the most prominent former Schalke players, it was his first job as a director. On 31 January, Sky reported that Schalke's financial situation may result in the end of the club in its current form by the end of the season. If relegated from the 2. Bundesliga, Schalke would not get a license for the 3. Liga, and would have to play in the Regionalliga West, the fourth division of German football. In that scenario, the current squad and staff would have to leave the club on a free transfer. The club formally requested a license for the 3. Liga on 15 March 2024.

The second half of the 2023–24 season started with a series of defeats. The difficult sportive situation was exacerbated by growing unrest within the club, attributed to the relationship between Wilmots, Geraerts, and the team. After losing 3–0 against Magdeburg, Wilmots openly criticized both the squad and head coach Geraerts. On match-day 24, Schalke achieved a 3–1 surprise victory against league leader St. Pauli, which was St. Pauli's first defeat of the season. Schalke followed up with a strong 3–3 against SC Paderborn. This, together with good individual performances from Yusuf Kabadayı and Ron Schallenberg, sparked new hope that the club would be able to avoid relegation. The following week, after a 5–2 loss against Hertha BSC, Geraerts was criticized heavily again for his lineup, and his lack of tactical direction, while Wilmots reaffirmed that Geraerts's position as head coach was not in question. Under Geraerts, the team continued to display inconsistent results and found itself once again in a relegation battle for much of the season. However, they secured their place in the league on Matchday 32 with a 4-0 away win against VfL Osnabrück.

At the start of the 2024–25 season in the 2. Bundesliga, Schalke recorded four points from their first six games, placing them 14th in the league standings. Following a 3–5 home defeat to SV Darmstadt 98 on matchday 6, Karel Geraerts and Marc Wilmots were dismissed.After two games under the interim leadership of U23 coach Jakob Fimpel, Kees van Wonderen was appointed head coach on October 7, 2024. He took over the team as it sat in 13th place in the standings and was signed a contract running until the summer of 2026. After noticeable improvement in performance toward the end of the year, the club finished the first half of the season in the same position with 20 points. During the second half of the season, newly signed Loris Karius temporarily replaced the previous starting goalkeeper, Justin Heekeren. After four games, however, Karius—who had played only one competitive match for his former club the previous season—was sidelined due to injury. Schalke won just five matches in the second half of the season and collected only one point across the final six matchdays. In early May 2025, following van Wonderen’s departure, Jakob Fimpel once again became interim head coach of the first team for the remainder of the 2024–25 season. Schalke ultimately finished the season only three points ahead of the relegation playoff spot under heavy fan scrutiny.

With an average attendance of more than 61,000 fans per home game, the club continues to enjoy a relatively high level of popularity even in the 2. Bundesliga. Across Europe, Schalke 04 ranked 14th in the UEFA rankings for total attendance during the 2024–25 season, making it the only second-division club in the top 16.

At the beginning of the 2025/26 season, new sporting director Frank Baumann and the chief executive Matthias Tillman decided to appoint Miron Muslić as head coach. The squad gained new additions on the defensive side such as Nikola Katić, Hasan Kuruçay and Soufiane El-Faouzi. The signings were intended to strengthen their weak defense of the prior season, during which they had conceded the third-highest number of goals in the league. Key players, including captain Kenan Karaman and Ron Schallenberg, remained at the club. With the return of former fan favorite and homegrown right-back Timo Becker, anticipation for the new season grew even further. Although Muslić opted for a back three, unlike van Wonderen, who played with four defenders, the revamped team proved to be far more solid defensively. The former Liverpool goalkeeper Loris Karius returned after his injury and recorded nine clean sheets during the first half of the season. Victories over direct promotion rivals such as Elversberg (1–0), Paderborn (2–1), and Darmstadt 98 (1–0), combined with the fewest goals conceded in the league (10), ensured that that Schalke clinched the championship over the midseason break ahead of Elversberg and Darmstadt. Over the winter transfer window, Schalke secured a star-studded deal, signing former Premier League champion Edin Džecko from AC Florence, alongside Austrian national player Dejan Ljubičić, to bolster the struggling offense (22 goals in 17 games). Following the 1-0 victory over Fortuna Düsseldorf on Matchday 32, the team secured its fifth promotion to the Bundesliga. Results elsewhere that matchday also ensured that the club clinched the second-division title ahead of schedule.

Under Miron Muslić the team became known for their high intensity, tight defensive, ranking last place in the expected goals against statistic. Unlike other teams known for their strong defense that season, such as Union Berlin or Nottingham Forrest, Schalkes back three defended high, focusing on gaining defensive control over the center and leading the statistic for won tackles and most ran kilometers. The team's approach is aimed to pin opponents back in their own half in order to prevent them from creating dangerous opportunities in front of Schalke's goal. In possession of the ball, the team sought to advance the ball towards the opposition goal as quickly as possible, exploiting the spaces and lack of defensive organisation that emerges immediately after possession changes hands. Therefore the team plays relatively few passes, with a high percentage directed vertically and progressively. After advancing the offensive tactics and signing higher quality, more creative offensive players during the midseason break of 25/26, the team switched to a back four and was able to be more effective in front of the opponents goal. After being promoted to the Bundesliga, Muslic brought back the back three for the 26/27 season; though after a poor 1-3-5 (win-draw-loss) start, the back four was reinstated

== Sponsors and finances ==
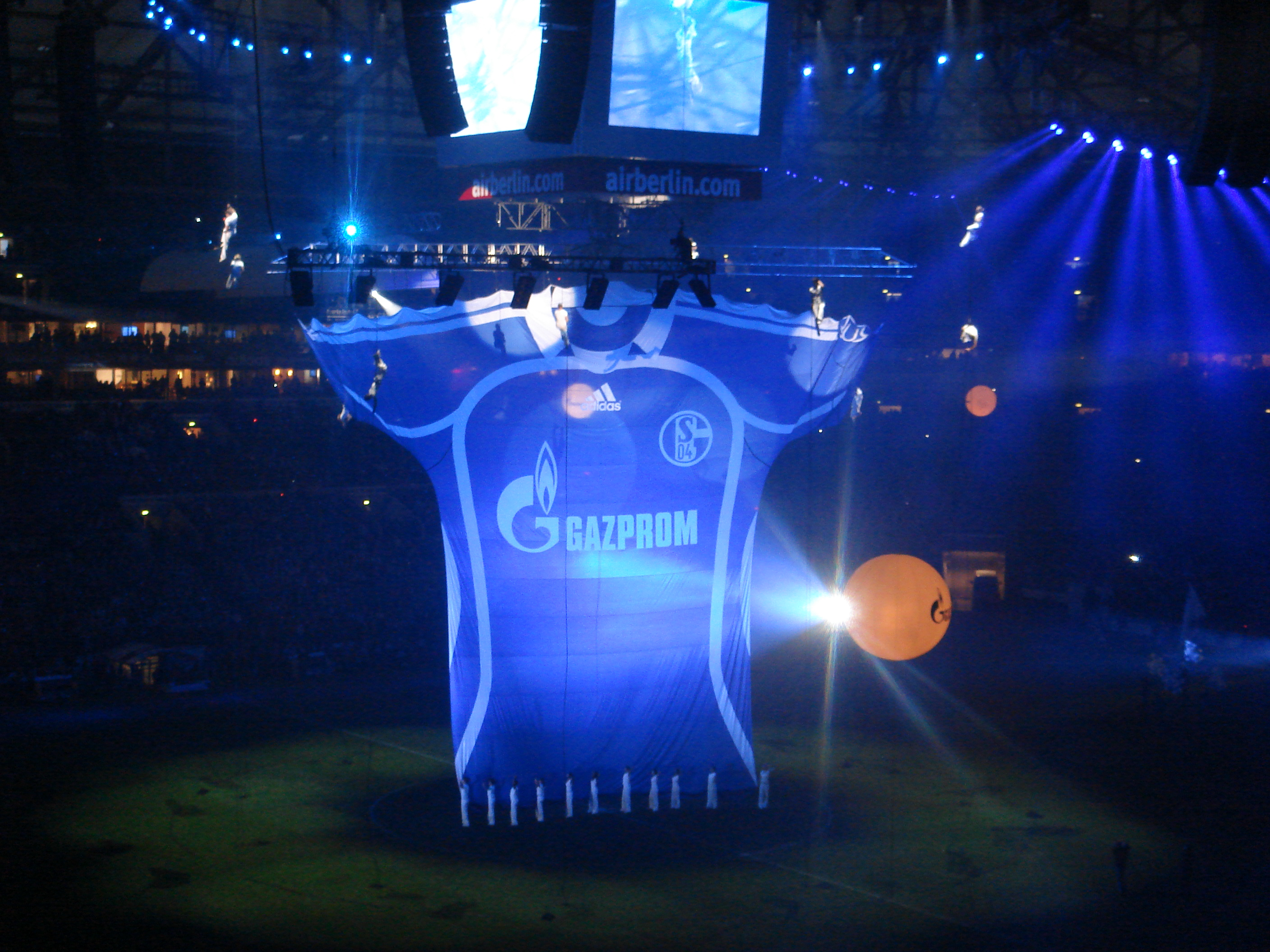
Schalke 04 royal blue trademark jersey with former sponsor Gazprom elaborately showcased prior to a match with Zenit Saint Petersburg at the Veltins-Arena to celebrate Gazprom's investment of over €125 million in S04

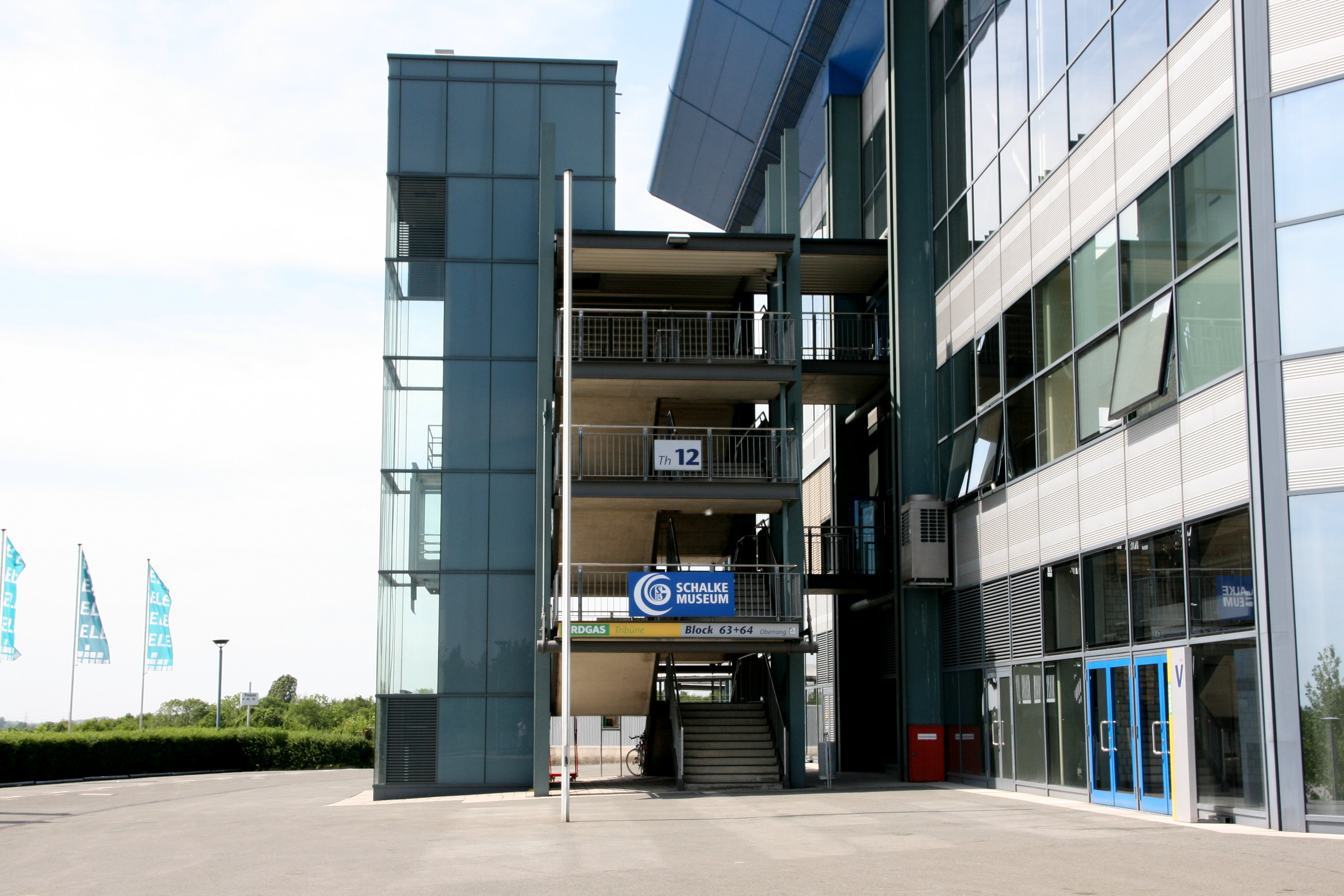
Exterior of the S04 museum at the S04 Veltins-Arena

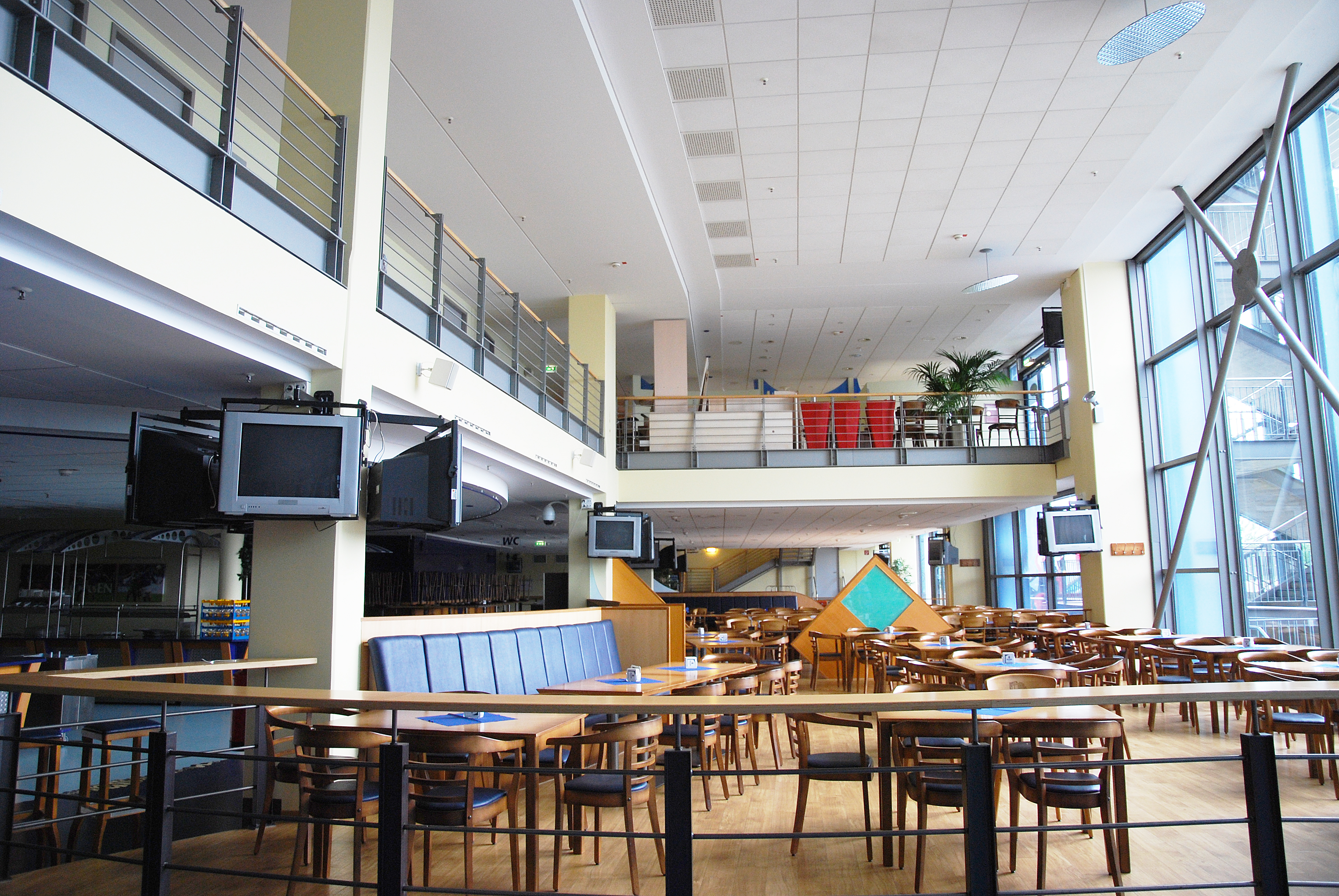
Restaurants at the S04 Veltins-Arena

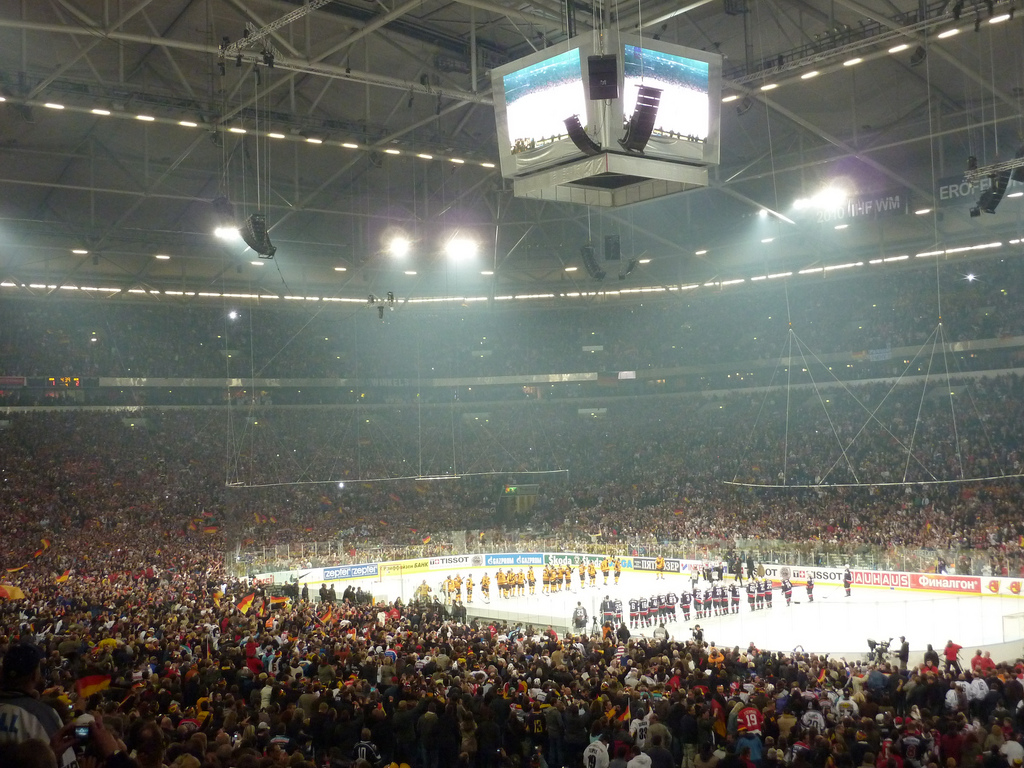
Ice hockey events are hosted at the S04 Veltins-Arena

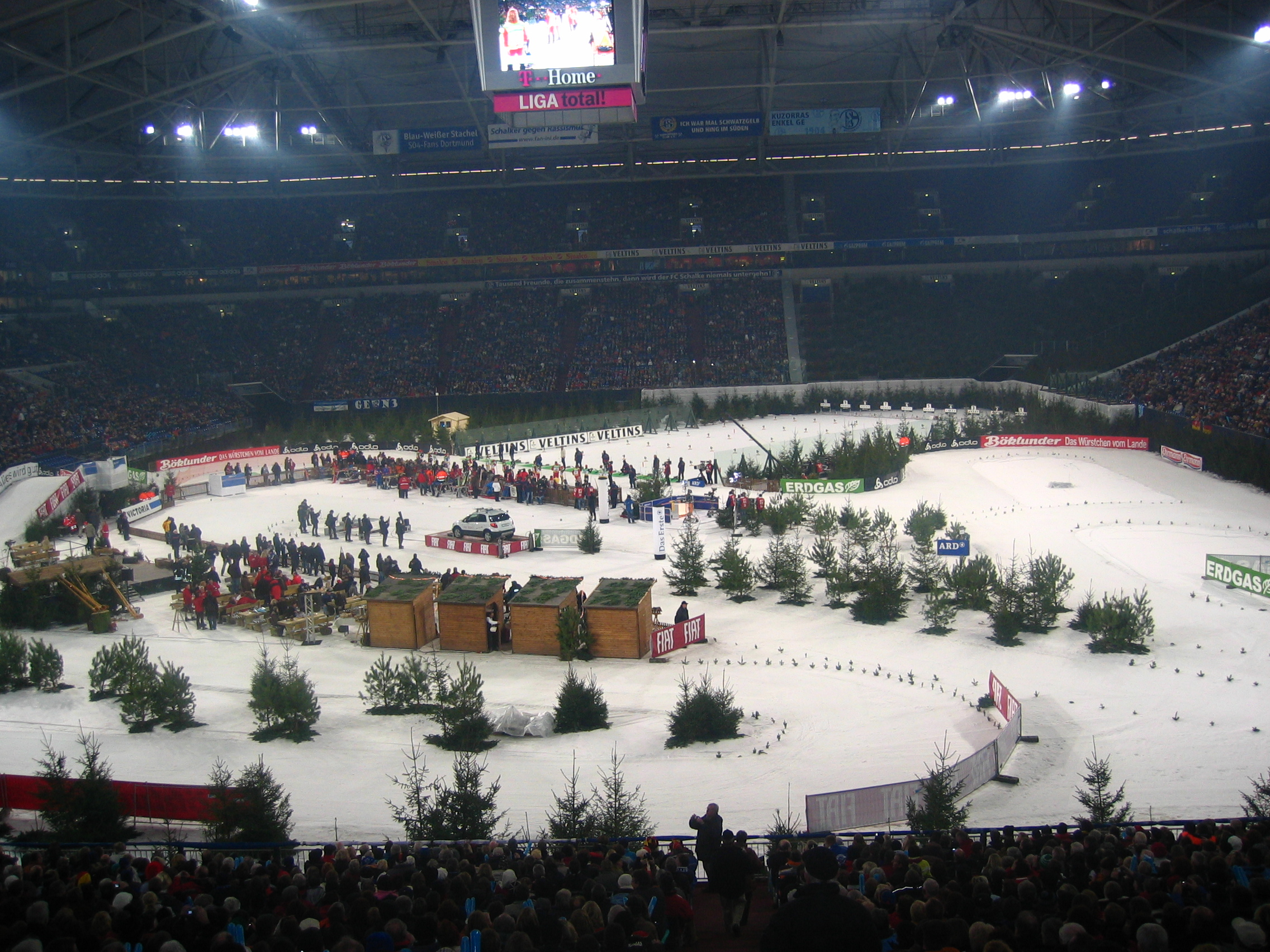
Biathlon and a variety of winter sport events are hosted at the S04 Veltins-Arena

As of 2022, the headline sponsor of Schalke 04 is the China-based electronics manufacturer Hisense. Since 2026, the current club front of shirt sponsor is Beumer Group, The Russia-based hydrocarbon giant Gazprom was dropped in February 2022 as a result of the Russian invasion of Ukraine. Additional sponsors include Düsseldorf-based insurance group ERGO Insurance Group; Munich-based automotive manufacturer BMW; and its motorcycle division BMW Motorrad; Spanish-based security insurance company Reale Seguros; China-based telecommunications company Huawei; cyber gambling and sports betting company bet-at-home.com; beverage giant Coca-Cola; North Rhine Westphalia-based brewery Veltins; and the current manufacturer of Schalke's squad kits, Germany-based Adidas.

In terms of operating income, Schalke possessed an operating income of €13 million as of 2014, and 12 per cent debt as of May 2019. As of 2019, Schalke generated the 14th-highest revenue of any football club in the world at €291 million.

In May 2019, Schalke 04 were still ranked by Forbes magazine as the 14th-richest football club in the world, at €683 million, a decrease of 3 per cent from the previous year. As of 2022, the club is no longer listed among the top 20 for either revenue or value.

Schalke 04 were among the Bundesliga teams that were hit hardest by the COVID-19 pandemic, and in April 2020 the club said it was threatened by bankruptcy.

October 2024 saw Schalke undertake a two-year sponsorship deal with Rootz Ltd. brand Wildz.

In January 2024, Sky reported that Schalke's financial situation may result in the end of the club in its current form by the end of the season: If relegated from the 2. Bundesliga, Schalke would not get a license for the 3. Liga, and would have to play in the Regionalliga West, the fourth division of German football. The current squad and staff would have to leave the club on a free transfer.

== Crest ==
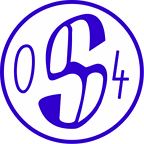
Crest of Schalke 04 (1924–1945)

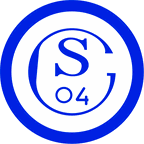
Crest of Schalke 04 (1945–1958)

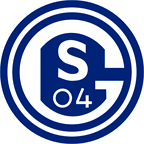
Crest of Schalke 04 (1958–1960)

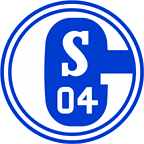
Crest of Schalke 04 (1960–1978)

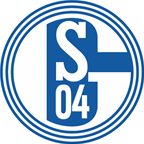
Crest of Schalke 04 (1978–1995)

Crest of Schalke 04 (1995–present)

== Players ==
=== Current squad ===
As of 1 September 2026

Note: Flags indicate national team as defined under FIFA eligibility rules; some limited exceptions apply. Players may hold more than one non-FIFA nationality.

No.	Pos.	Nation	Player
1	GK	GER	Loris Karius
4	DF	TUR	Hasan Kuruçay
5	DF	GER	Timo Becker
6	MF	GER	Ron Schallenberg
7	FW	KOR	Hwang Hee-chan (on loan from Wolverhampton Wanderers)
8	MF	GER	Robin Gosens (on loan from Fiorentina)
9	FW	MLI	Moussa Sylla
10	FW	BIH	Edin Džeko
11	FW	FRA	Bryan Lasme
13	MF	JPN	Satoshi Tanaka
14	MF	GER	Janik Bachmann
15	FW	DEN	Emil Højlund
17	DF	SUI	Adrian Gantenbein
19	FW	TUR	Kenan Karaman (captain)

No.	Pos.	Nation	Player
20	FW	AUT	Junior Adamu
21	MF	AUT	Dejan Ljubičić
22	GK	GER	Kevin Müller
23	MF	MAR	Soufiane El-Faouzi
24	MF	ALG	Adil Aouchiche
25	DF	BIH	Nikola Katić
27	MF	GER	Finn Porath
29	MF	CMR	Junior Dina Ebimbe
33	DF	GER	Vitalie Becker
36	GK	GER	Johannes Siebeking
38	MF	GER	Luca Vozar
39	DF	AUT	Maximilian Wöber
43	DF	TUR	Mertcan Ayhan

=== Out on loan ===
Note: Flags indicate national team as defined under FIFA eligibility rules; some limited exceptions apply. Players may hold more than one non-FIFA nationality.

No.	Pos.	Nation	Player
—	GK	GER	Luca Podlech (at Aalesunds FK until 31 December 2026)
—	DF	AUS	Dylan Leonard (at Alemannia Aachen until 30 June 2027)
—	DF	ARG	Felipe Sánchez (at Santos Laguna until 30 June 2027)
—	DF	BEL	Martin Wasinski (at Almere City until 30 June 2027)

No.	Pos.	Nation	Player
—	MF	GER	Mika Wallentowitz (at Greuther Fürth until 30 June 2027)
—	FW	SEN	Christian Gomis (at Tenerife until 30 June 2027)
—	FW	GER	Peter Remmert (at MSV Duisburg until 30 June 2027)
—	FW	GER	Jakob Sachse (at Viktoria Köln until 30 June 2027)

=== Reserve team ===
Note: Flags indicate national team as defined under FIFA eligibility rules; some limited exceptions apply. Players may hold more than one non-FIFA nationality.

No.	Pos.	Nation	Player
26	DF	CZE	Tomáš Kalas
30	DF	GER	Anton Donkor
37	MF	GER	Max Grüger

No.	Pos.	Nation	Player
47	FW	TOG	Zaid Tchibara
—	DF	CMR	Steve Noode
—	MF	TUR	Ayman Gülaşı

=== Notable former players ===
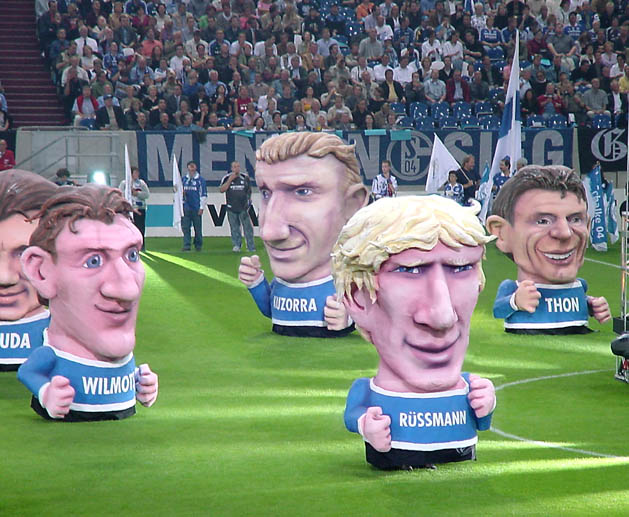
Sculptures with some of the FC Schalke 04 "Team of the Century"

In the year 2000, the supporters voted for Schalker Jahrhundertelf, the "Team of the Century":

Note: Flags indicate national team as defined under FIFA eligibility rules; some limited exceptions apply. Players may hold more than one non-FIFA nationality.

No.	Pos.	Nation	Player
—	GK	GER	Norbert Nigbur
—	DF	GER	Klaus Fichtel
—	DF	GER	Olaf Thon
—	DF	GER	Rolf Rüssmann
—	MF	GER	Fritz Szepan
—	MF	GER	Ingo Anderbrügge

No.	Pos.	Nation	Player
—	MF	BEL	Marc Wilmots
—	FW	GER	Ernst Kuzorra
—	FW	GER	Klaus Fischer
—	FW	GER	Reinhard Libuda
—	FW	GER	Rüdiger Abramczik

=== Records ===
As of 26 May 2021.

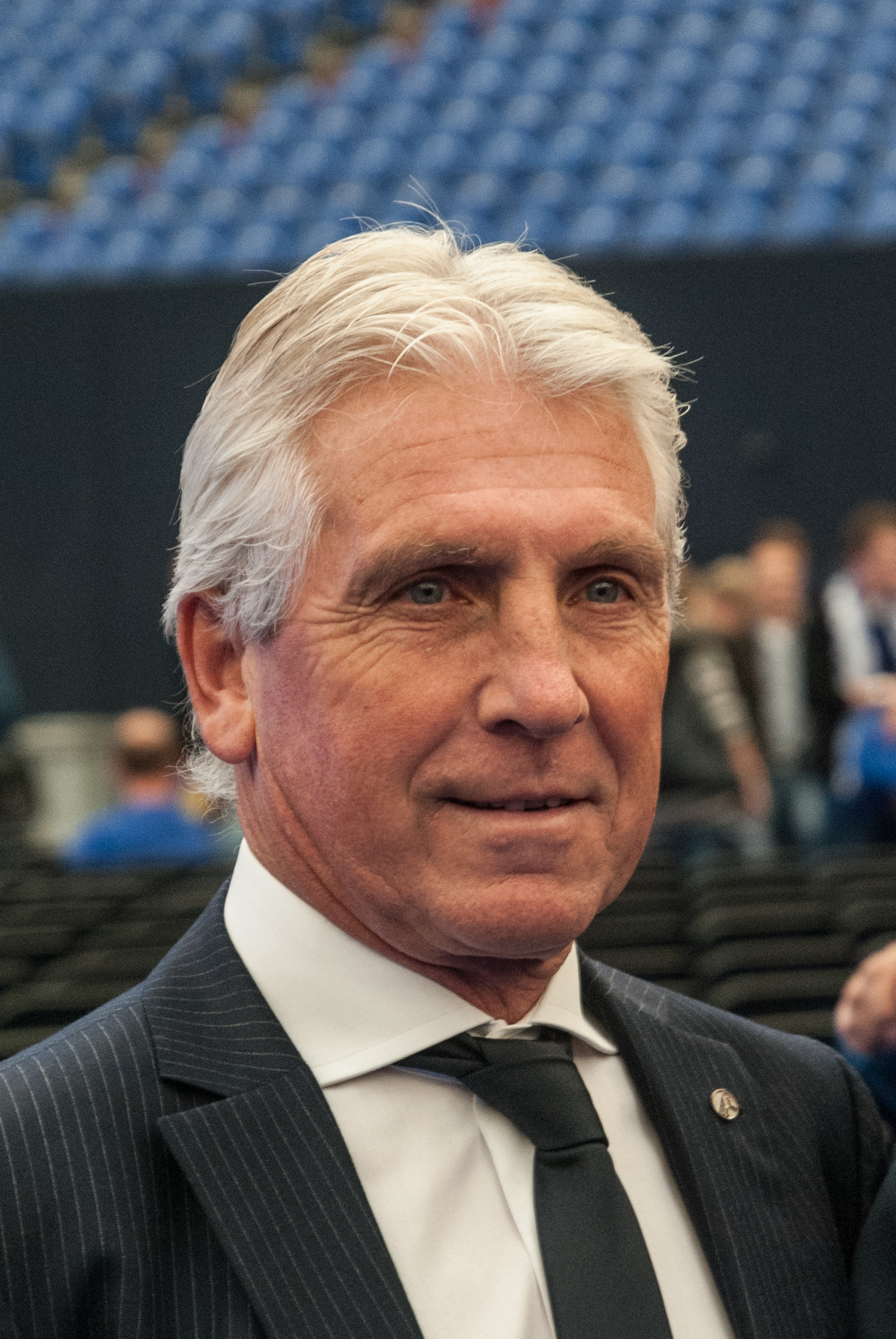
Klaus Fischer scored the most goals in Schalke's Bundesliga history

Most appearances (Bundesliga)
#	Player	Nat.	Apps
1	Klaus Fichtel	(Germany)	477
2	Norbert Nigbur	(Germany)	355
3	Rolf Rüssmann	(Germany)	304
4	Klaus Fischer	(Germany)	295
4	Olaf Thon	(Germany)	295
6	Herbert Lütkebohmert	(Germany)	286
7	Gerald Asamoah	(Germany)	279
8	Mike Büskens	(Germany)	257
9	Jiří Němec	(Czech Republic)	256
10	Benedikt Höwedes	(Germany)	240

Top scorers (Bundesliga)
#	Player	Nat.	Goals
1	Klaus Fischer	(Germany)	182
2	Klaas-Jan Huntelaar	(Netherlands)	84
3	Ebbe Sand	(Denmark)	73
4	Kevin Kurányi	(Germany)	71
5	Olaf Thon	(Germany)	52
6	Erwin Kremers	(Germany)	50
7	Ingo Anderbrügge	(Germany)	46
8	Helmut Kremers	(Germany)	45
9	Rüdiger Abramczik	(Germany)	44
9	Gerald Asamoah	(Germany)	44

== Stadium ==
Schalke's stadium, known as the Veltins-Arena under a sponsorship agreement with Veltins brewery, was built in the summer of 2001 and has a capacity of 62,271 spectators. Schalke regularly draws sell-out crowds to what is widely regarded as one of the most modern and best multi-use facilities in Europe. The facility was previously known as the Arena AufSchalke and replaced the Parkstadion (capacity of 62,000) built in 1973. Prior to this, the club played its matches in the Glückauf-Kampfbahn, constructed in 1928 with a capacity of 35,000. The Glückauf-Kampfbahn was used for amateur matches during its later years with a reduced capacity of 11,000. It is still used by the club for ceremonial purposes, like for the introduction of new players and head coaches.

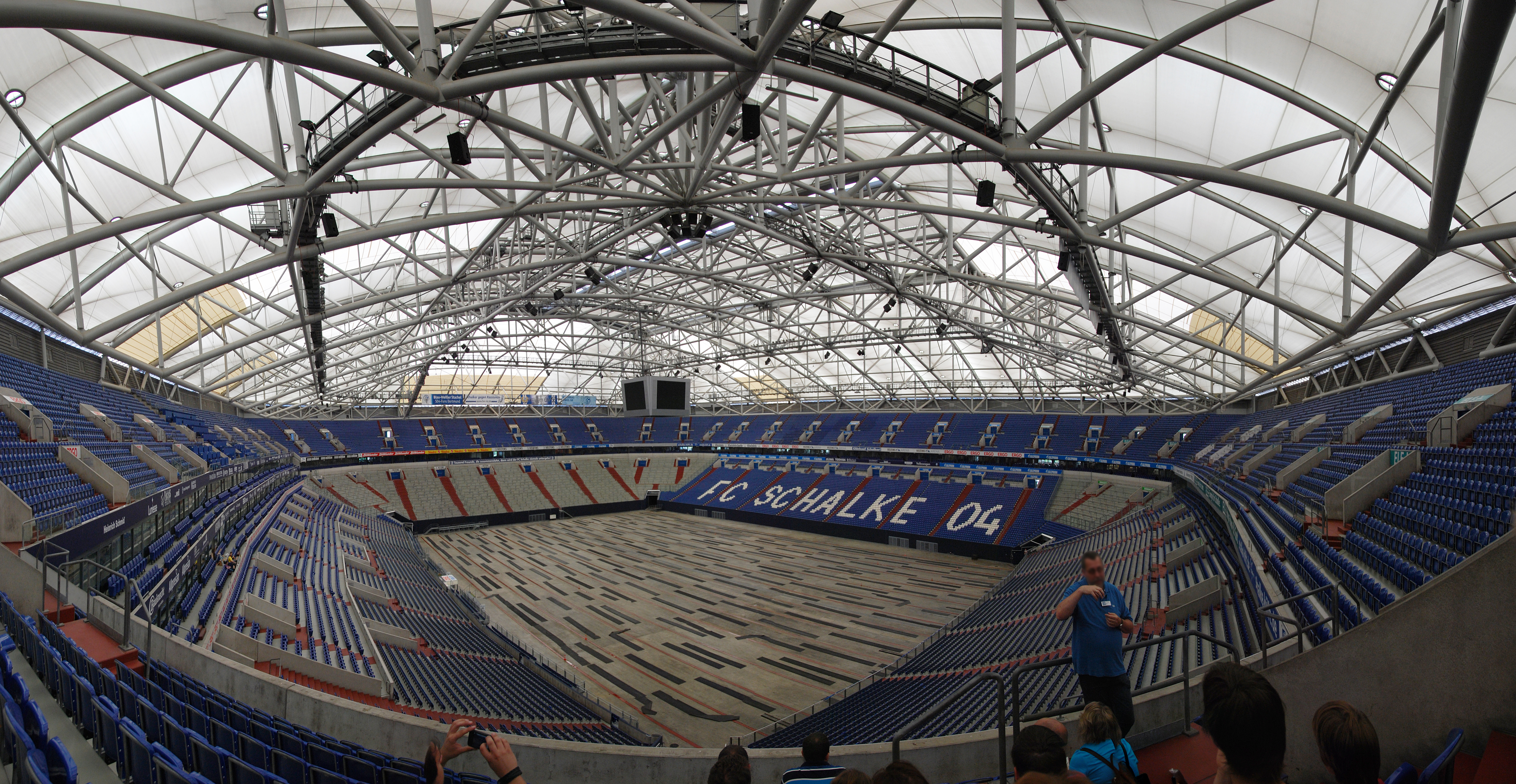
An interior design panorama of the Veltins-Arena

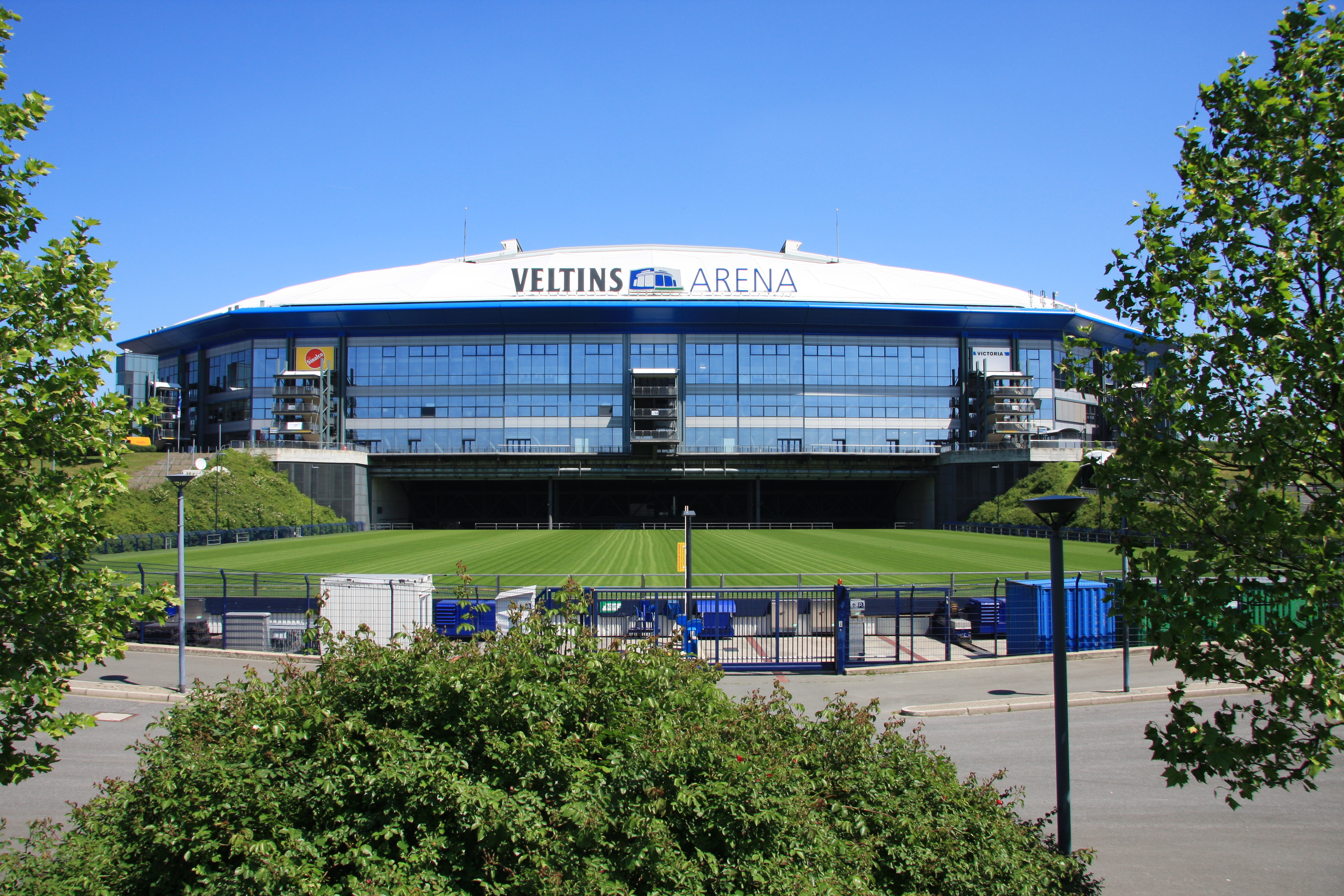
Exterior of the Veltins-Arena

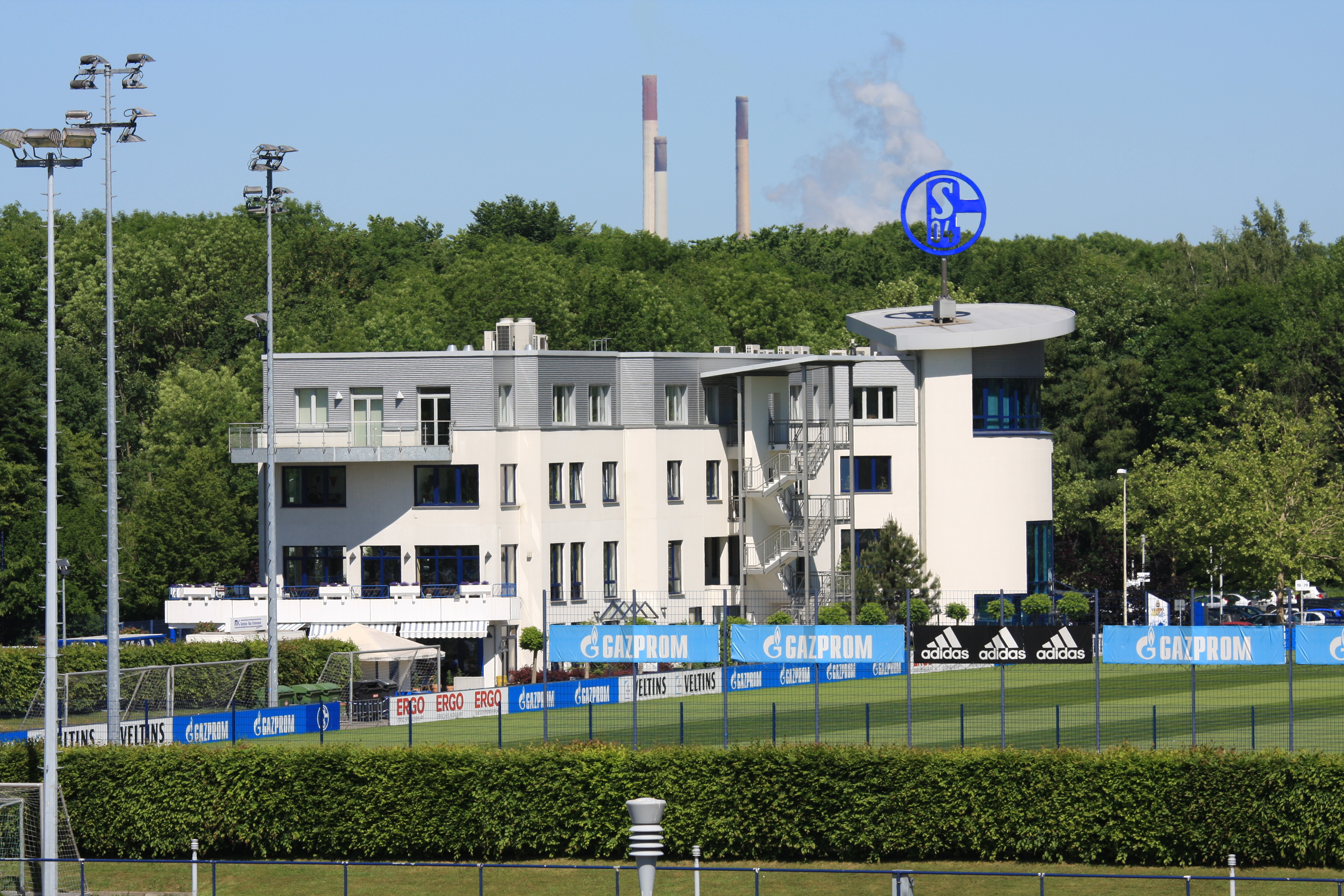
Training ground of FC Schalke 04 known as the Geschäftsstelle

== Fan culture ==
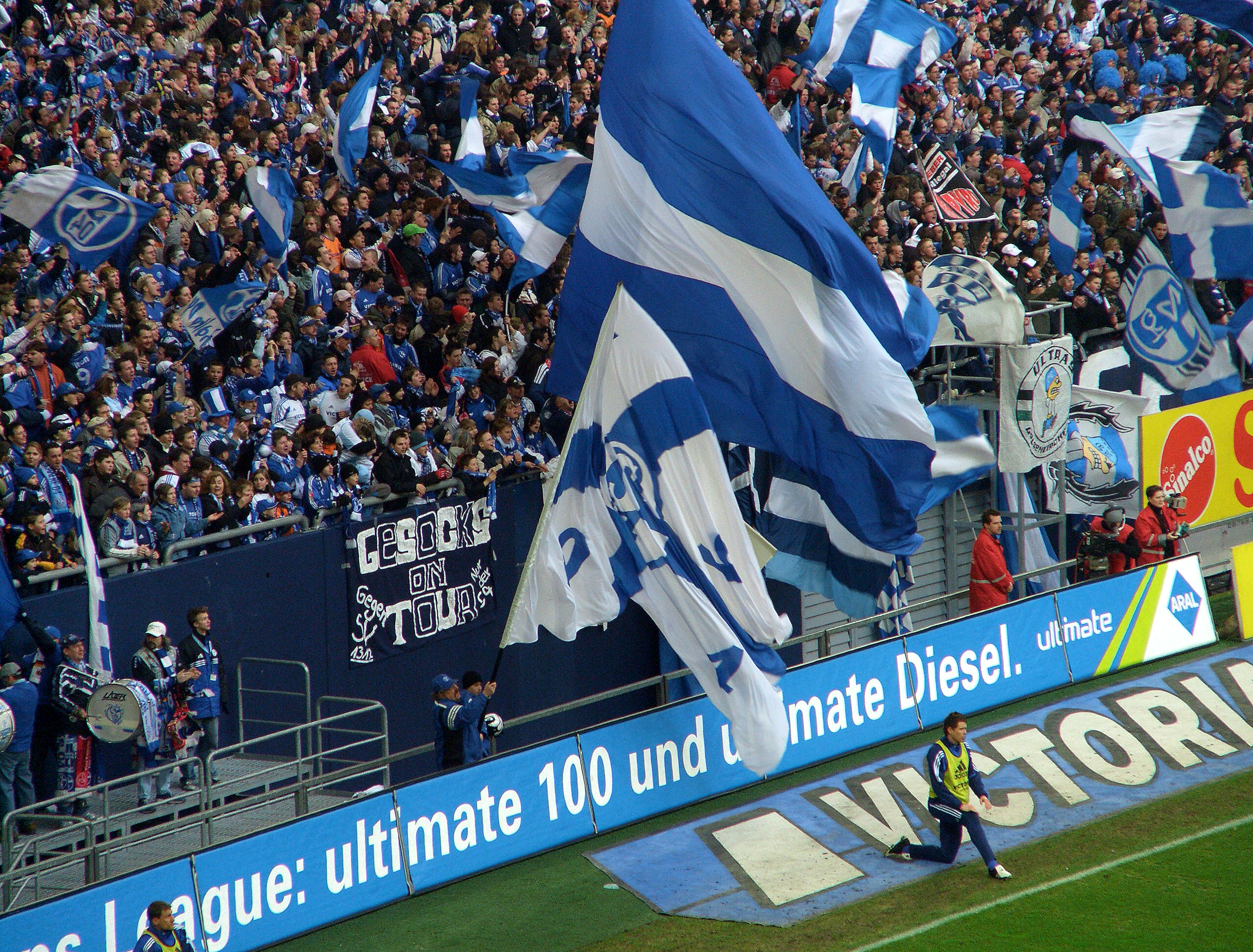
S04 Ultras Gelsenkirchen

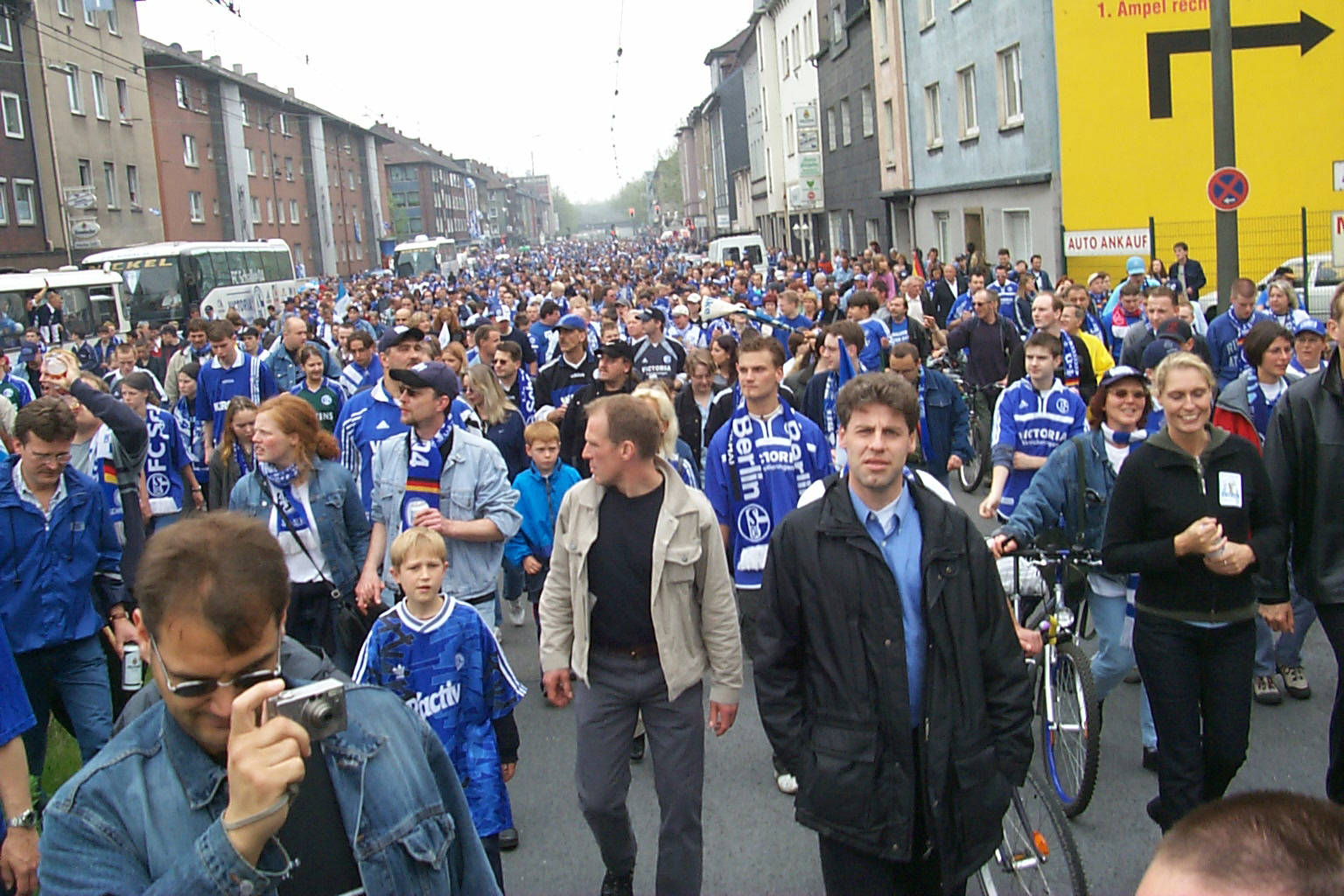
S04 fans in the streets of Gelsenkirchen on a matchday

The number of members of Schalke 04 grew from 10,000 in 1991 to 160,000 in 2022. This figure makes Schalke 04 the second-biggest sports club in Germany and fourth-biggest sports club in the world, behind Bayern Munich, Benfica, and CA Boca Juniors. As of 2022, Schalke is ranked as the 94th-best football club in Europe and in Continental Europe by UEFA's UEFA club rankings. A representation of the Schalke 04 membership structure in 2014 showed, among other things, a female share of 20 per cent and a share of the age group up to ten years of 14 per cent. Around 30 per cent of the members were not from North Rhine-Westphalia. Apart from Gelsenkirchen (10,197 members) and its immediate neighbouring towns, the members of Schalke 04 also come from more distant cities such as Cologne (1,117) and Berlin (932). This high growth in Schalke 04 membership is also promoted by promotions of Schalke 04, as from 2013 to further "advertise Schalke 04 brand".

On 21 August 2013, Schalke 04 played their first home match of the 2013–14 season, a UEFA Champions League qualifier at the Veltins-Arena against the Greek runners-up PAOK (led by former head coach Huub Stevens), drawing 1–1. The match and result was more than overshadowed by a controversial police operation in the "S04 Ultras Gelsenkirchen" block of the Veltins-Arena against the fans of the home team with nearly 80 of the home team's fans injured. The return match was won 3–2 by Schalke without any of their supporters allowed to attend the match.

=== Fan Club Association ===
Schalke 04 Fan Club Association (SFCV) is an umbrella organization which, according to their own statement, has an estimated 1,500 fan clubs. Of those listed by the SFCV, 860 Schalke 04 fan clubs in October 2012 were divided geographically as follows: an estimated 200 were in Ruhr, 360 in the rest of North Rhine-Westphalia and 300 in the other federal states. A member of the board of SFCV has a permanent seat on the board of FC Schalke 04 and in 2013 SFCV merged with the "Ultras Gelsenkirchen" and later the supporters' club, Schalke Fan-Initiative eV with several members of strong fan groups from the SFCV, as is clear from the merger of the SFCV with the fan section of S04 has not adequately represented the fan interests.

=== Friendships ===
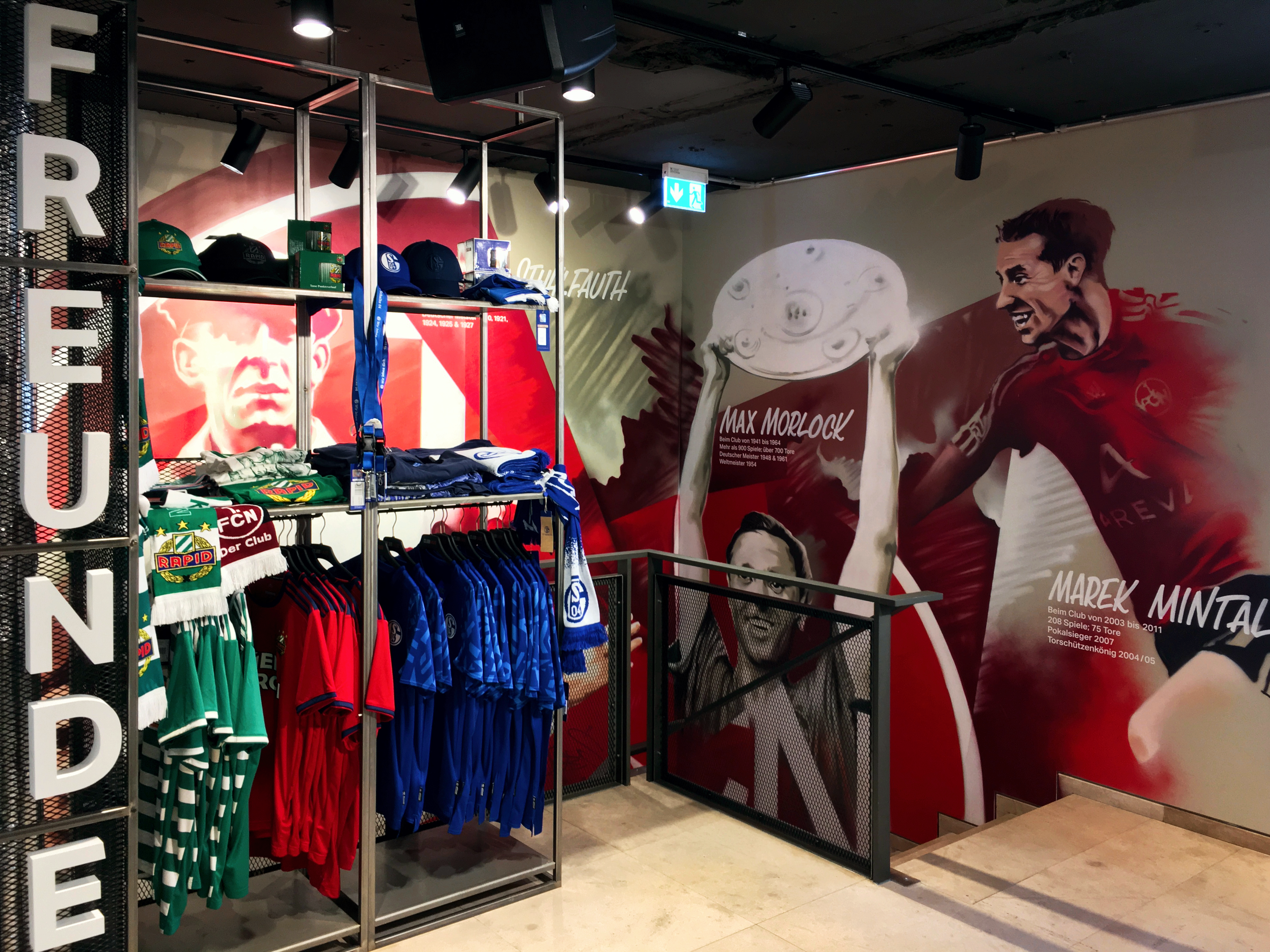
Friendship corner in the Fan Shop of 1. FC Nürnberg with shirts of Schalke 04

The fan-base of Schalke is connected, in a friendly way, with the supporters of 1. FC Nürnberg, Dutch club Twente, Vardar Skopie from North Macedonia, Spanish Club Sevilla F.C., Scottish club Heart of Midlothian,Italian club Salernitana and Polish club Górnik Zabrze. The friendship with Nürnberg is the oldest connection between two fan-bases in Germany. Before a match between both clubs, the official club songs are played.

=== Club songs ===
- Blau und weiß, wie lieb ich Dich ("Blue and White, How I Love You") is the official club song.
- Das Steigerlied, traditional German mining song, played before every match.
- Blau und Weiß ein Leben lang ("Blue and white a life-long") is the goal tune.
- Königsblauer S04 ("Royal Blue S04") played after every match

Popular unofficial chants are

- Der Mythos vom Schalker Markt ("The Myth of the Schalke Market"),
- Opa Pritschikowski ("Grandpa Pritschikowski"),
- Von der Emscher bis zum Bosporus ("From the Emscher to the Bosphorus"),
- Wir schlugen Roda... ("We beat Roda..."),
- Die Eurofighter sind wieder da ("The Eurofighter are back again"),
- Für deine Farben leben und sterben wir ("For your colours we live and die"),
- Wir lieben alle nur den FC Schalke ("We all love only FC Schalke"),
- Wir sind die Fans ("We are the fans"),
- Hurra wir sind die Schalker Knappen ("Hurray we are the Schalke Knappen"),
- Kohle unter unser'n Füßen ("Coal under our feet"), and
- Steht auf, wenn ihr Schalker seid ("Stand up if you're Schalke"), sung to the melody of "Go West" by the Pet Shop Boys (itself a cover of a Village People song).

=== Revierderby ===
The Revierderby is the rivalry between local clubs Schalke 04 and Borussia Dortmund, both situated in the densely populated Ruhr region, about 30 kilometers from each other. The term may be used for any match between two football clubs of the Ruhr region (such as VfL Bochum, Rot-Weiss Essen or MSV Duisburg), but it is most commonly associated with the rivalry between Schalke and Dortmund due to the derby's popularity and prestige. To some fans, the win of the derby itself is more important than the actual performance in the Bundesliga.

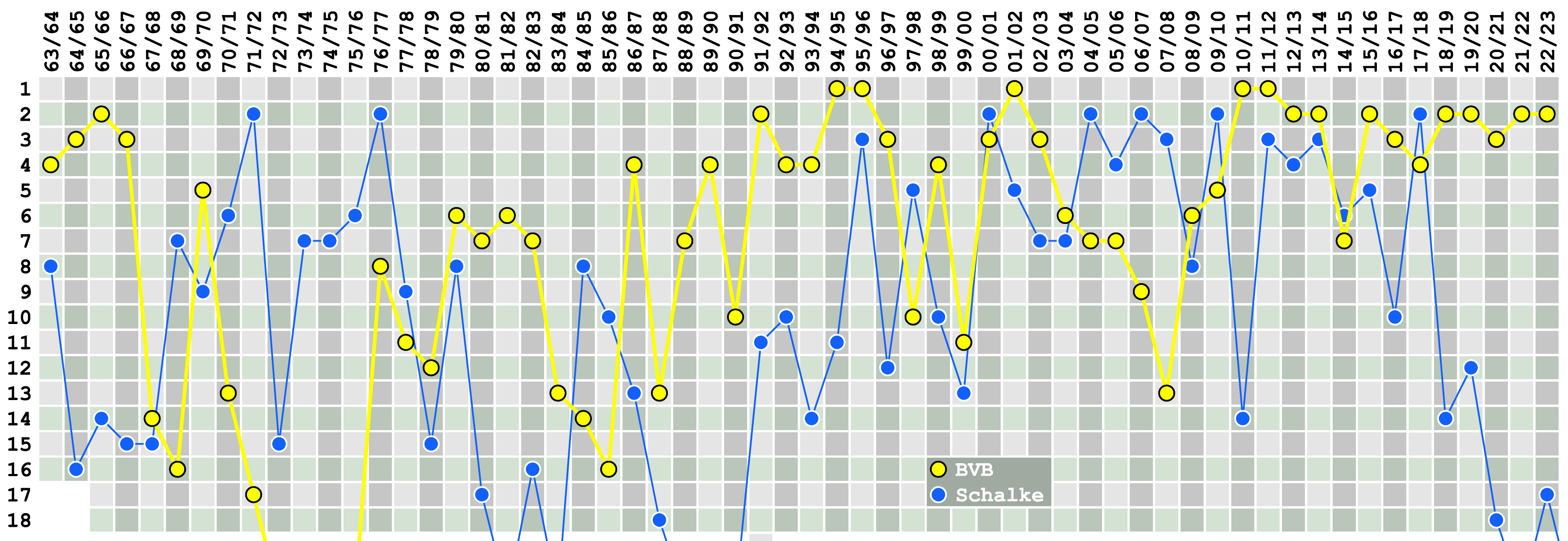
Respective league placements of Schalke 04 and Borussia Dortmund since the 1963–64 season

== In popular culture ==
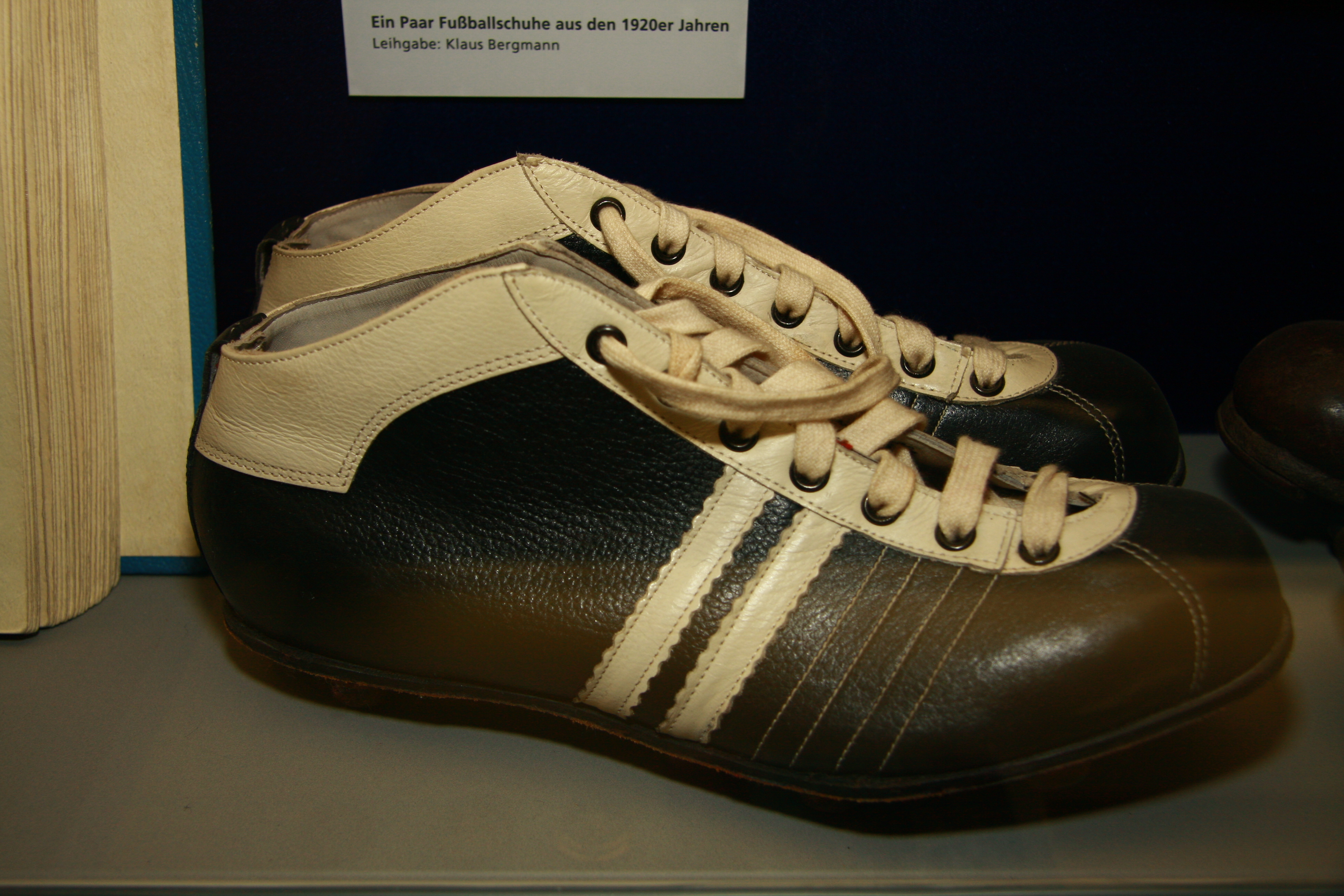
The boots worn by the entire S04 squad players in the 1920s displayed at the museum of Schalke 04

Schalke has been subject of a feature-length film called Fußball ist unser Leben ("Football is our life"). Actors Uwe Ochsenknecht and Ralf Richter, both of whom were in the award-winning film Das Boot, played the main roles, while many persons associated with Schalke had cameo roles, such as manager Rudi Assauer, coaches Huub Stevens and Helmut Schulte, and player Yves Eigenrauch. Also featured were prominent fans like Manfred Breuckmann, Ulrich Potofski or DJ Hooligan. The film is a comedy about "Hans", a Schalke fanatic, and his three pals who somehow get involved in kidnapping and trying to bring back to form the team's new star player "Di Ospeo" and in the process bet Hans' house that their idol will score in the final match.

"Schalke" is mentioned in the film Das Boot when the bosun tells the crew in their ward room: "I got bad news for you men. Schalke lost 5–0, looks like we won't be in the final this year." This is historically inaccurate, as Schalke never lost 5–0 in an important match during the time-frame of the movie (1941).

== Honours ==
Roll of honour

=== Domestic ===
- Bundesliga:
  - Runners-up: 1971–72, 1976–77, 2000–01, 2004–05, 2006–07, 2009–10, 2017–18
- German Championship
  - Winners: 1934, 1935, 1937, 1939, 1940, 1942, 1958
- 2. Bundesliga
  - Winners: 1981–82, 1990–91, 2021–22, 2025–26
- DFB-Pokal (German Cup)
  - Winners: 1937, 1971–72, 2000–01, 2001–02, 2010–11
- DFB-Ligapokal (German League Cup)
  - Winners: 2005
- DFL-Supercup (German Super Cup)
  - Winners: 2011

=== International ===
- UEFA Cup
  - Winners: 1996–97
- UEFA Intertoto Cup
  - Winners: 2003, 2004
- Cup of the Alps
  - Winners: 1968

=== UEFA club coefficient ranking ===
As of 20 July 2023

Rank	Nation	Team	Points
95	Israel	Hapoel Be'er Sheva	17,000
96	Belgium	Royal Antwerp	17,000
97	Germany	Schalke 04	17,000
98	Sweden	Djurgården	16,500
99	Turkey	Sivasspor	16,500

=== Youth ===
Domestic

- Under 19 Bundesliga
  - Winners: 1976, 2006, 2012, 2015
  - Runners-up: 1975, 1980, 1981
- Under 19 Bundesliga West
  - Winners: 2006, 2012, 2013, 2014, 2015, 2018, 2019
- Under 17 Bundesliga
  - Winners: 1978, 2002
  - Runners-up: 1977, 1980
- Under 17 Bundesliga West
  - Winners: 2013, 2017, 2022, 2023

=== Double ===
- 1937: Championship and Cup

== Coaches and management ==
As of 1 July 2025

Managing board
Role	Person
Chairman of the supervisory board	(Germany) Axel Hefer
Deputy chairman of the board	(Germany) Sven Kirstein
Deputy chairman of the board	(Germany) Johannes Struckmeier
Member of the board	(Germany) Holger Brauner
Member of the board	(Germany) Harald Förster
Member of the board	(Germany) Stefan Hegmanns
Member of the board	(Germany) Steffi Jones
Member of the board	(Germany) Pascal Krusch
Member of the board	(Germany) Frank Lotze
Member of the board	(Germany) Michael Riedmüller
Member of the board	(Germany) Ender Ulupinar
Chairman of the board	(Germany) Matthias Tillmann
Member of the board	(Germany) Frank Baumann
Member of the board	(Germany) Christina Rühl-Hamers
Coaching staff
Role	Person
Head coach	(Austria) Miron Muslić
Assistant coach	(England) Eddie Lattimore
Assistant coach	(United States) Adin Osmanbašić
Assistant coach	(Germany) Tim Hoogland
Goalkeeper coach	(Turkey) Volkan Ünlü
Head of athletics	(Germany) Alexander Storck
Sporting management
Role	Person
Director of professional football	(Netherlands) Youri Mulder
Head of scouting and transfers	(Germany) Maximilian Lüftl
Executive assistant	(Germany) René Grotus
Head of administration	(Germany) Mario Grevelhörster
Loan player manager	(Germany) Sidney Sam
Head of medical department and team doctor	(Germany) Dr. Patrick Ingelfinger
Physiotherapist	(Germany) Oliver Grabowski
Physiotherapist	(Germany) Marc Magnier
Sports scientist	(Germany) Rasmus Bruns
Prevention and rehabilitation	(Germany) Marc Thum
Prevention and rehabilitation	(Germany) Nico Wamig
Technical director	(Austria) Lorenz Kutscha-Lissberg
Match analyst	(Germany) Jonas Dittrich
Match analyst	(Germany) Justus Verhasselt
Spielermanagement	(Italy) Joe Miraglia
Spielermanagement	(Equatorial Guinea) Juan Oburu
Equipment manager	(Germany) Enrico Heil
Equipment manager	(Germany) Holger Blumenstein
Transport coordinator/Driver	(Germany) Lars Laser

== Notable coaches ==
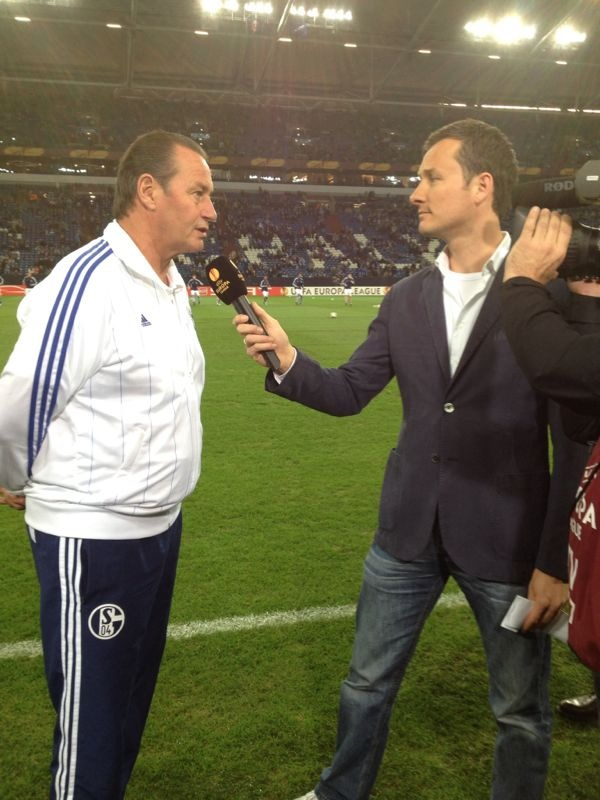
Huub Stevens coached the club in four spells: firstly, from 1996 to 2002, where he won the UEFA Cup in 1997; secondly, from 2011 to 2012; thirdly, in 2019 as an interim; and again in 2020 as interim coach. He was voted 'Coach of the Century' by Schalke fans in 1999.

Name	Nationality	From	To	Honours
Hans Schmidt	Germany	1 July 1933	12 June 1938	3 German championships (1934, 1935, 1937); German championship runners-up (1933, 1938); 5 Gauliga Westfalen championships (1934, 1935, 1936, 1937, 1938); 1 Tschammerpokal (1937); runners-up (1935, 1936)
Otto Faist	Germany	13 July 1938	31 December 1942	3 German championships (1939, 1940, 1942); German championship runners-up (1941); 4 Gauliga Westfalen championships (1939, 1940, 1941, 1942); Tschammerpokal runners-up (1941, 1942)
Ernst Kuzorra	Germany	1 July 1946	30 September 1947	
Fritz Szepan	West Germany	1 July 1949	30 June 1954	1 Oberliga West championship (1951); runners-up (1952)
Edi Frühwirth	Austria	1 July 1954	30 June 1959	1 German championship (1958); 1 Oberliga West championship (1958); runners-up (1956); DFB-Pokal runners-up (1955)
Ivica Horvat	Yugoslavia	1 July 1971; 1 July 1978	30 June 1976; 17 March 1979	Bundesliga runners-up (1971–72); 1 DFB-Pokal (1971–72)
Huub Stevens	Netherlands	8 October 1996; 27 September 2011; 14 March 2019; 18 December 2020	30 June 2002; 16 December 2012; 30 June 2019; 22 December 2020	Bundesliga runners-up (2000–01); 2 DFB-Pokals (2000–01, 2001–02); 1 UEFA Cup (1997); DFB-Ligapokal runners-up (2001, 2002)
Felix Magath	Germany	1 July 2009	16 March 2011	Bundesliga runners-up (2009–10); 1 DFL-Supercup (2010)

== Other departments ==
The basketball department played in the 1988–89 season in the National Basketball League Basketball Bundesliga and from 2004 for several seasons in the ProA, the second highest basketball league in Germany. 2009 saw Schalke 04 voluntarily withdrawal from the ProA. Currently, the team competes in ProB. The club founded a blind football department in 2015, which plays in the Blindenfußball-Bundesliga.

The women's football club was initially dissolved in the mid-1980s, but achieved some notable successes, including five-time Westphalia championships, and competed in the German championship and DFB Cup. Schalke 04 later cooperated with 1. FFC Recklinghausen, a women's football club, from 2007 to 2010, and the current women's team was established in July 2020, to compete in Kreisliga B, the eighth tier of women's football, in 2021.

Other longstanding departments include the handball department, which was founded in 1926 and competed in the Gaumeister, Gauliga during Nazi Germany, and the current top division. The athletic department was founded in 1922, with the club's former players including Olympic silver medallist decathlete Frank Busemann, and 2003 European Athletics Junior Championships gold 200-metre runner, Sebastian Ernst. The table tennis department was founded in 1947, and competes in the Westphalia district league. The women's team was one of the early participants in the national league until it withdrew in 1956.

In 2016, Schalke acquired League of Legends e-sports team Elements, becoming the second professional sports team with a League of Legends division, after Beşiktaş. In early June, they debuted in the European League of Legends Championship Series, the top level of professional League of Legends competition in Europe. The club also announced former Rot-Weiss Oberhausen and Sportfreunde Siegen midfielder and SK Gaming co-founder Tim Reichert as Head of ESport.

== See also ==
- The Football Club Social Alliance
- Forbes' list of the most valuable football clubs

== Bibliography ==
- Bodo Berg: More than a game: from the life of a football fan; with photos of Yves own smoke. Verlg the workshop, Göttingen 2000, ISBN 3-89533-299-2.
- Jenrich Burkh: Royal Blue Planet, Göttingen 2004, ISBN 3-89533-446-4.
- Jörg Seven Eick, Thomas Spiegel, Gerd Voss (Eds.): 100 Schalke years – 100 stories Schalke. Plain text, Essen 2004, ISBN 3-89861-321-6.
- Stefan Goch / Norbert Silver Bach: Between blue and white is gray, Essen 2005, ISBN 3-89861-433-6.
- Hardy Green: Faith, Love, Schalke. The complete history of FC Schalke 04, The Workshop, Göttingen 2011, ISBN 978-3-89533-747-5.
- William Herbert Koch: The Royal Blues: the phenomenon Schalke 04, Düsseldorf 1973, ISBN 3-7700-0365-9.
- Olivier Kruschinski: Blue and white for a lifetime. A season with Schalke, Herten 2005, ISBN 3-938152-04-4.
- Marie Kuster: Sport und Politik – Die Geschichte des FC Schalke 04 im "Dritten Reich", GRIN Verlag, 2011, ISBN 3-65609-015-7.
- Georg Röwekamp: The legend lives on. The history of FC Schalke 04, Göttingen 1996 [and newer edition], ISBN 3-89533-164-3.
- Schalke Fan Initiative (Eds.), The tip of the Eichbergs. Most scandals of FC Schalke 04. plain text, Essen 2005, ISBN 3-89861-393-3.
- Helmut Wood: Schalke is priceless, Gelsenkirchen, 1991, ISBN 3-924984-30-1 .
- Helmut Wood: Schalke smile. Curiosities and concrete of fans and dreamers – experienced and collected, Gelsenkirchen 1984, ISBN 3-9800764-6-6.
