= Markus Knüfken =

German actor

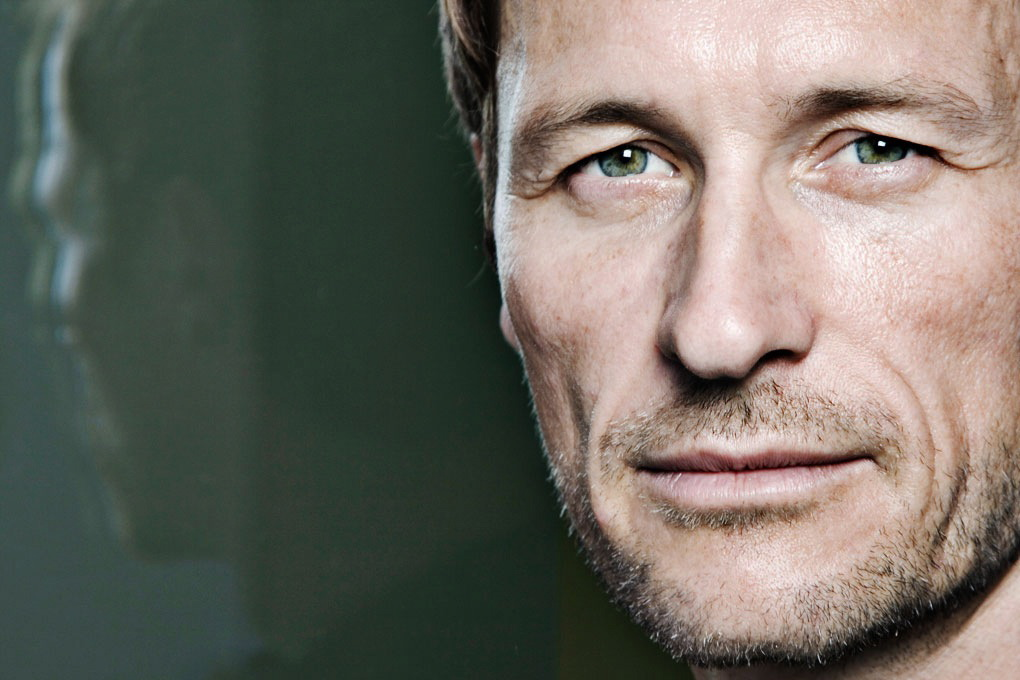
- Born: 18 August 1965 (age 61); Essen, West Germany (now Germany)
- Occupation: Actor
- Years active: 1978–present

Markus Knüfken (born 18 August 1965) is a German actor. He has appeared in more than eighty films since 1978.

== Selected filmography ==
Film
Year	Title	Role	Notes
1999	Bang Boom Bang		
1998	Das merkwürdige Verhalten geschlechtsreifer Großstädter zur Paarungszeit		

TV
Year	Title	Role	Notes
1978–1996	Auf Achse (TV series)		
