= Pogo 1104 =

- Created by: Wigbert Wicker
- Starring: Richy Müller; Ralf Richter; Anja Schüte; Erich Bar
- Country of origin: Germany
- No. of episodes: 4

Production
- Running time: 3 hours

Original release
- Release: 11 November – 2 December 1984

Pogo 1104 is a German television mini-series.

== See also ==
- List of German television series
