= Fußball ist unser Leben =

2000 film

- Directed by: Tomy Wigand
- Distributed by: Seven X
- Release date: February 10, 2000
- Country: Germany

Fußball ist unser Leben (German for "football is our life") is a German football (soccer) drama/comedy movie, centering on supporters of FC Schalke 04. It was directed by Tomy Wigand, with Uwe Ochsenknecht and Ralf Richter in the main roles.

== Plot ==
Hans Pollak is a hardcore fan of Schalke 04. Together with his best friend Mike, he is member of the "Dios Knappen Gelsenkirchen" supporters club, named after their idol, the (fictional) Schalke star player, Pablo Di Ospeo. Pollak is so single-minded that he neglects the birth of his second child to watch his favorite club, and takes his family and girlfriend for granted.

One day, Pollak decides to bet his house that Di Ospeo will score in the next game. He is shocked to see that his idol is addicted to cocaine, abducts him, and chains him into his room to make him quit cold turkey. Then, Pollak's neglected girlfriend has an affair and Pollak's mother dies of a heart attack. Di Ospeo tries to rescue her but cannot reach her because he is shackled. Beyond desperate, Pollak decides to hang himself so that his family will at least get his life insurance. His friends save him using a Schalke flag, and a rehabilitated Di Ospeo scores the winning goal in the next game. Having won the bet after all, Pollak keeps his house and makes up with his girlfriend.

== Guest roles ==
Many persons related to Schalke 04 have guest roles. Manager Rudi Assauer, coach Huub Stevens, player Yves Eigenrauch, masseur Charly Neumann and ex-coach Helmut Schulte have cameos, just like prominent fans like reporter Ulrich Potofski, radio commentator Manfred Breuckmann and disc jockey Dirk Oberschulte-Beckmann.

== Reception ==
The film opened at number eleven at the German box office and had grossed $389,727 after 10 days.

== Awards ==
- Bavarian Film Awards: Uwe Ochsenknecht (best actor) and Marita Marschall (best supporting actress)
- German Film Awards: Uwe Ochsenknecht (best actor)
