= Hilmi Sözer =

Turkish-German actor

- Born: Hilmi Sözer; 9 March 1970 (age 56); Ankara, Turkey.
- Years active: 1994–present

Hilmi Sözer (born 9 March 1970) is a Turkish-German actor.

== Filmography ==
Film
Year	Film	Role	Notes
2008	Evet, I Do!		
2008	Jerichow	Ali Özkan	
2008	Die Rote Zora	Begovic	
2007	Vollidiot	Einsatzleiter	
2005	Playa del futuro	Rudi	
2004	7 Zwerge – Männer allein im Wald	The guard	
2004	Süperseks	Tarik	
2004	Das Apfelbaumhaus	Hammid	
2004	Germanikus	Römischer Sklavenjäger	
2004	Pura vida Ibiza	Hermes	
2003	Lassie		
2003	Espresso	Luigi	
2002	If It Don't Fit, Use a Bigger Hammer	Kümmel	
2002	Elephant Heart	Cem	
2001	Der Schuh des Manitu	Hombre	
2000	Tour Abroad	Zeki	
2000	Kanak Attack	Pfandleiher	
1999	'Ne günstige Gelegenheit	Drakonin	
1999	Bang Boom Bang	Hilmi	
1998	Trains'n'Roses	Harry	
1997	Ballermann 6	Mario	
1997	Cologne's Finest	Alibaba	
1997	Das erste Semester	Böller	
1994	Voll normaaal	Mario	

=== Television ===
Year	Film	Role	Notes
2011	The End of a Mouse Is the Beginning of a Cat	Erol Ozak	
2009	Ein Mann, ein Fjord!	Kemal	
2006–2009	Krimi.de	Erol Aslan	6 episodes
2008	Zwei Zivis zum Knutschen	Dr. Bernd Müller	
2008	Die dunkle Seite	Menemenci	
2008	Tatort	Aka Özkan	1 episode
2007	Die ProSieben Märchenstunde	Yago	1 episode
2007	LadyLand		1 episode
2006	Blackout – Die Erinnerung ist tödlich	Turgut Algan	3 episodes
2006	Alles bleibt anders	Ali Tüfekci	
2006	Kiss me Kismet	Süleyman	
2005	Drei gegen Troja	Ali	
2005	Zeit der Wünsche	Yasar	
2004	Einsatz in Hamburg	Drago	1 episode
2004	Sounds of Fear	Antonio	
2002	Wen küsst die Braut?		
2002	Die Frauenversteher – Männer unter sich	Ali Baba	
2002	Alles getürkt!	Cem	
2001	Sind denn alle netten Männer schwul	Selim	
2001	Ein unmöglicher Mann	Dr. Ungerer	
2000	Die Verwegene – Kämpfe um deinen Traum	Emir Pnin	
2000	Das Phantom	Pit	
2000	Neonnächte – Der U-Bahn-Schlitzer		
1999	Die Bademeister	Böller	
1998	Die zwei beiden vom Fach		
1996	Immer im Einsatz – Die Notärztin	Nazim	1 episode
1994	Der König	Ali	
