= Ralf Richter =

German actor (1957–2026)

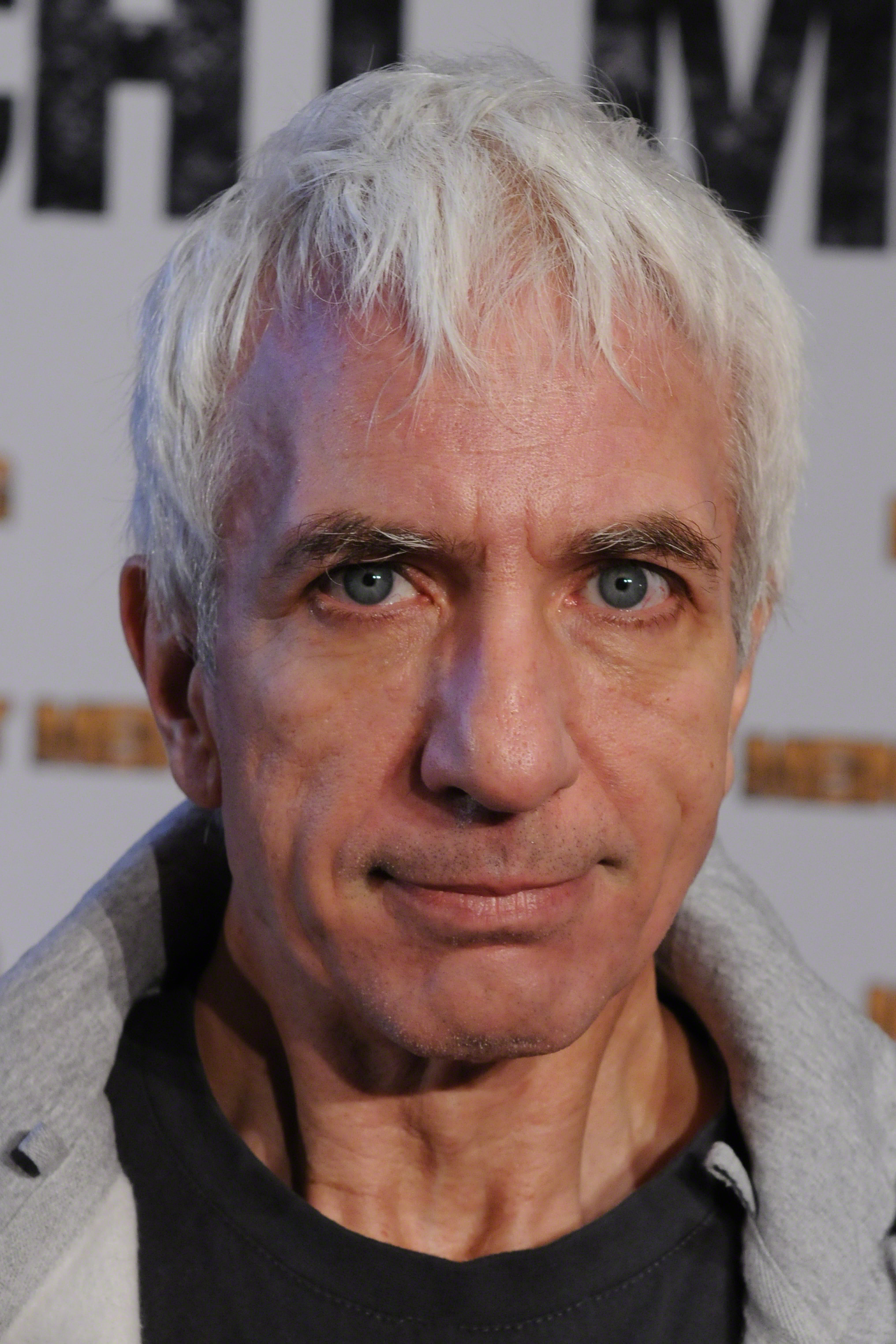
- Richter in 2014
- Born: 17 August 1957; Essen, North Rhine-Westphalia, West Germany
- Died: 15 September 2026 (aged 69); Cologne, North Rhine-Westphalia, Germany
- Occupation: Actor
- Years active: 1981–2024
- Relatives: FM Einheit (brother)

Ralf Richter (17 August 1957 – 15 September 2026) was a German actor. He debuted as the crude sailor "Frenssen" in the Academy Award-nominated 1981 film Das Boot and frequently appeared in German television series. He played main roles in German films such as Bang Boom Bang (1999), Fußball ist unser Leben (1999) and If It Don't Fit, Use a Bigger Hammer (2002).

== Background ==
His younger brother, Frank, is known as the musician FM Einheit.

Richter died from heart failure complicated by chronic obstructive pulmonary disease in Cologne, on 15 September 2026, at the age of 69.

== Filmography ==
Filmography
Year	Title	Role	Director
1981	Tour de Ruhr (Note: TV miniseries)	Wölfchen	Reinhard Schwabenitzky
1981	Das Boot	Frenssen	Wolfgang Petersen
1983	Rote Erde	Otto Schablowski	Klaus Emmerich
1984	Decoder		Muscha
1984	Abwärts	Otto	Carl Schenkel
1984	Pogo 1104	Rick	Wigbert Wicker
1984	Moving Targets	Strotzki	Volker Vogeler
1987	Losers (Note: TV film)	Richie	Bernd Schadewald
1987	The Crack Connection (Note: Schimanski-film)	Sandrowski	Hajo Gies
1988	The Cat	Britz	Dominik Graf
1991	Superstau	Hermann Pacholke	Manfred Stelzer
1992	Cosimas Lexikon	Klaus Borgmann	Peter Kahane
1996	Peanuts – The Bank Pays Everything	Mario	Carlo Rola
1999	The Cry of the Butterfly	Tom	Frank Strecker
1999	Bang Boom Bang	Kalle Grabowski	Peter Thorwarth
2000	Fußball ist unser Leben	Mike	Tomy Wigand
2001	Suck My Dick	Hyde	Oskar Roehler
2002	If It Don't Fit, Use a Bigger Hammer	Kalle	Peter Thorwarth
2004	Cowgirl	Peter Blessing	Mark Schlichter
2006	Goldene Zeiten	Bullet Harry Grabowski	Peter Thorwarth
2009	Kopf oder Zahl	Ron	Benjamin Eicher, Timo Joh. Mayer
