= If It Don't Fit, Use a Bigger Hammer =

2002 German comedy film

- Directed by: Peter Thorwarth
- Starring: Dietmar Bär; Ralf Richter
- Release date: 7 March 2002
- Running time: 101 minutes
- Country: Germany
- Language: German

If It Don't Fit, Use a Bigger Hammer (German: Was nicht passt, wird passend gemacht) is a 2002 German comedy film directed by Peter Thorwarth.

== Plot ==
Kümmel, Kalle and Horst work for the contractor Werner Wiesenkamp, who runs a small construction company in Bergkamen in the district of Unna. Since Kümmel, Kalle and Horst are underpaid, and their boss lives large, the three employees persuade the boss on his garden party to hire Marek, a Polish illegal worker. However, Wiesenkamp hires the young architecture student Philipp as an additional worker (much to Horst's dismay), who actually only needs an internship certificate for his new employer in Asia. Philipp hopes to get this certificate without real work, with the help of his uncle, a city councilor.

The following day Philipp makes his way to the construction site, still assuming that he only has to wait for Wiesenkamp's signature. However, he mistakenly enters the neighboring construction site, run by Wiesenkamp's brother Ernst. The misunderstanding is cleared up and foreman Jochen takes Philipp to the correct construction site. While the first construction site was professionally run, the second is an improvised mess. Until Wiesenkamp arrives with Marek, the three protagonists assume that Philipp is an additional worker. Horst, in particular, harasses Philipp at every opportunity.

Philipp is given the task of securing scaffolding, but instead tries to rebook his flight to Kuala Lumpur. Kümmel, Kalle and Horst stage Marek's death by falling down from the scaffolding, and ask Wiesenkamp to pay for their silence. Philipp, who sees himself as guilty of Marek's "accident", calls an ambulance, but when it arrives at the construction site, there is no indication of an accident.

After work, Kümmel, Kalle and Horst pretend to dismember Marek's "corpse" and bury it on the construction site while Philipp is inconsolable. That evening, Kümmel, Kalle and Horst celebrate at Horst's home where Marek is also present and gets his cut. Here it is clear that Marek is not dead, but instead is conspiring with the others.

While they are celebrating, Philipp visits Astrid, Horst's daughter, who also studies architecture and wants him to help her set up her new computer. Not enthusiastic about the nascent relationship between his daughter and Philipp, Horst kicks out Philipp. While they are exchanging words on the doorstep, Marek can be seen in the background, unnoticed by Philipp. This is just the beginning of a series of scenes in which Marek can be seen again and again, mostly in locations that Wiesenkamp also visits.

Meanwhile, the company is in financial difficulties, but the three employees and intern Philipp are willing to finish the construction project to help their boss Wiesenkamp out of financial distress. For example, they use asbestos insulation, which Kalle gets for free from his brother-in-law Siggi, who works in a hardware store.

However, while digging, the four find an unexploded World War II-era aerial bomb. Instead of calling the bomb squad, Kümmel, Kalle and Horst decide to re-bury the bomb and simply build the foundation one meter shorter than planned in the blueprint. During a late-night meeting at Horst's house, Philip not only fakes the blueprints on Astrid's computer, but also gets closer to her.

Thanks to Philip's help, the construction project can continue as planned, and the initial teasing stops abruptly. To celebrate this success, Kümmel, Kalle and Horst visit the red light district together with Philipp. While drunk, Philipp tells a prostitute about the dead Polish worker. However, when Werner Wiesenkamp's wife and his brother disappear to Majorca, things take a dramatic turn.

The next morning, Astrid visits the construction site to ask Philipp why he did not come to their date. Horst tells his daughter that Philipp was with him and the others in the brothel. When Werner Wiesenkamp, who is also a sports pilot, sees Marek alive at the airport, he drives to the construction site to confront its employees. Meanwhile, a police operation is taking place on the construction site, as the prostitute has told the police about Philipp's story. Officers uncover the plastic bags cemented by Kümmel, Kalle and Horst after Marek's accident. However, the bags contain only several cans of used oil and not, as assumed, the dismembered corpse of Marek. The construction site is then shut down by the authorities.

Kümmel, Kalle and Horst are hired by Ernst Wiesenkamp, Werner's brother, but fired shortly thereafter. Meanwhile, Werner Wiesenkamp plans to mount the aerial bomb from the construction site under his sports plane and drop it on his brother's house. Although Kümmel, Kalle, Horst, Astrid and Philipp can thwart his insane plan, the bomb detonates when handled with the excavator. The explosion uncovers a disused mining tunnel that leads from Werner Wiesenkamp's construction site to the adjacent construction site of Ernst Wiesenkamp. Kümmel, Kalle, Horst, Philipp and Werner unceremoniously tear in the old mining pillars.

Back outside, they discover the topping-out ceremony being performed on Ernst Wiesenkamp's construction site. When the weight of the topping out ornament is added to the house, it collapses.

Some time later, Marek has become rich through stock trading and is now an investor in Werner's construction business. Philipp and Astrid are happy together, while Kümmel, Kalle and Horst are on their old employer's payroll again.

== Cast ==
- Dietmar Bär - Werner Wiesenkamp
- Ralf Richter - Kalle
- Hilmi Sözer - Kümmel
- Willi Thomczyk - Horst
- Peter Thorwarth - Philipp
- Alexandra Maria Lara - Astrid
- Armin Dillenberger - Marek
- Crescentia Dünßer - Urte
- Nicholas Bodeux - Arno
- Michael Brandner - Ernst Wiesenkamp
- Patrizia Moresco - Gerda Wiesenkamp
- Tana Schanzara - Mama Wiesenkamp
