= 2024–25 FC Viktoria Köln season =

FC Viktoria Köln
2024–25 season
- President: Holger Kirsch
- CEO: Eric Bock; Axel Freisewinkel
- Head coach: Olaf Janßen
- Stadium: Sportpark Höhenberg
- 3. Liga: 5th
- Middle Rhine Cup: First round
Home colours	Away colours

The 2024–25 season is the 121st season in the history of Viktoria Köln, the 14th season as FC Viktoria Köln and the club's sixth consecutive season in 3. Liga. In addition to the domestic league, the team is scheduled to participate in the Middle Rhine Cup.

== Transfers ==
=== In ===
Pos.	Player	Transferred from	Fee	Date	Source
MF	(Germany) Benjamin Hemcke	(Germany) SSVg Velbert	Loan return	1 July 2024	
GK	(Germany) Dudu	(Germany) Werder Bremen	Free	1 July 2024	
FW	(Germany) Lex-Tyger Lobinger	(Germany) 1. FC Kaiserslautern	Free	1 July 2024	
MF	(Germany) Enrique Lofolomo	(Germany) Hallescher FC	Free	1 July 2024	
DF	(Poland) Kevin Pytlik	(Germany) Wuppertaler SV	Free	1 July 2024	
MF	(Germany) Robin Velasco	(Germany) VfB Lübeck	Free	1 July 2024	
FW	(Kosovo) Albion Vrenezi	(Germany) 1860 Munich	Free	1 July 2024	
DF	(Germany) Kwabe Schulz	(Germany) Rot-Weiß Erfurt	Free	4 July 2024	
FW	(Germany) Serhat-Semih Güler	(Germany) 1860 Munich	Free	16 July 2024	

=== Out ===
Pos.	Player	Transferred from	Fee	Date	Source
FW	(Austria) Tobias Anselm	(Austria) LASK	Loan return	1 July 2024	
DF	(Germany) Kaden Amaniampong	(Germany) VfB Stuttgart II	Free	1 July 2024	
FW	(Germany) André Becker	(Germany) Arminia Bielefeld	Free	1 July 2024	
FW	(South Korea) Seokju Hong	(Germany) Schalke 04 II	Free	1 July 2024	
MF	(Germany) Jeremias Lorch	(Germany) SV Sandhausen	Free	1 July 2024	
FW	(Germany) Luca Marseiler	(Germany) Darmstadt 98	Free	1 July 2024	
MF	(Germany) David Philipp	(Germany) 1860 Munich	Free	1 July 2024	
MF	(Germany) Stefano Russo	(Germany) Arminia Bielefeld	Undisclosed	1 July 2024	
DF	(Germany) Michael Schultz	(Germany) Rot-Weiss Essen	Undisclosed	1 July 2024	
GK	(Germany) Ben Voll	(Germany) FC St. Pauli	Undisclosed	1 July 2024	
DF	(Germany) David Kubatta	(Germany) Dynamo Dresden	Undisclosed	3 July 2024	
GK	(Germany) Elias Bördner	(Germany) Alemannia Aachen	Free	1 August 2024	

== Friendlies ==
=== Pre-season ===
29 June 2024 Friendly	Viktoria Köln (Germany)	1–0	(Germany) Bonner SC	Cologne-Brück
	Lofolomo 28'	Report		Stadium: Training ground Pohlstadtsweg

5 July 2024 Friendly	Viktoria Köln (Germany)	0–1	(Germany) SC Paderborn	Paderborn
12:30		Report	Platte 16'	Stadium: Training and youth development centre Pitch 1

13 July 2024 Friendly	Viktoria Köln (Germany)	0–0	(Belgium) Eupen	Cologne-Brück
		Report		Stadium: Training ground Pohlstadtsweg

17 July 2024 Friendly	Bergisch Gladbach 09 (Germany)	0–1	(Germany) Viktoria Köln	Bergisch Gladbach
		Report	Henning 7'	Stadium: BELKAW-Arena

20 July 2024 Friendly	Viktoria Köln (Germany)	3–3	(Germany) 1. FC Köln	Cologne
14:00	Engelhardt 4' Vrenezi 50'; Güler 74'	Report	Adamyan 19'; Heintz 43'; F. Dietz 47'	Stadium: Sportpark Höhenberg; Attendance: 6,214

27 July 2024 Friendly	SV Elversberg (Germany)	1–1	(Germany) Viktoria Köln	Elversberg
14:00	Sickinger 68'	Report	Koronkiewicz 88'	Stadium: URSAPHARM-Arena an der Kaiserlinde; Attendance: 3,000

28 July 2024 Friendly	Viktoria Köln (Germany)	4–0	(Germany) SpVg Frechen 20	Cologne-Brück
	Güler; Pytlik; M. El Mala; M. El Mala	Report		Stadium: Training ground Pohlstadtsweg

=== Mid-season ===
17 August 2024 Friendly	Deutz 05 (Germany)	1–12	(Germany) Viktoria Köln	Cologne-Deutz
16:00	Goal		M. El Mala de Meester; Lobinger; Vrenezi; Greger; Güler; Sticker	Stadium: BBBank Sportpark; Referee: Denis Schmidt

6 September 2024 Friendly	Viktoria Köln (Germany)	1–3	(Germany) SV Rödinghausen
	Lopes Cabral	Report	Goal

=== FVM Charity tournament ===
The Middle Rhine Football Association (FVM) is initiating a charity blitz tournament for the first time this year, in which six professional and ambitious amateur clubs from the association's region will take part. The charity tournament is intended to benefit amateur clubs from the Middle Rhine region that are particularly committed to children and youth work.

5 September 2024 Quarter-final	Viktoria Köln	1–1 (4–3 p)	1. FC Düren	Bonn
16:00	Greger 7'	Report	Geimer 3'	Stadium: Sportpark Nord; Attendance: 1,500

5 September 2024 Semi-final	Viktoria Köln	2–0	Alemannia Aachen	Bonn
18:00	Fritz 32'; Lopes Cabral 35'	Report		Stadium: Sportpark Nord; Attendance: 1,500

5 September 2024 Final	1.FC Köln	1–0	Viktoria Köln	Bonn
18:00	Waldschmidt 17' (pen.)	Report		Stadium: Sportpark Nord; Attendance: 1,500

== Competitions ==
=== Overall record ===
Competition	First match	Last match	Starting round	Record							
Competition	First match	Last match	Starting round	Pld	W	D	L	GF	GA	GD	Win %
3. Liga	4 August 2024	17 May 2025	Matchday 1	8	5	0	3	13	7	+6	62.50
Middle Rhine Cup	30 October 2024		First round	0	0	0	0	0	0	+0	—
Total				8	5	0	3	13	7	+6	62.50

Source: DFB, Soccerway

=== 3. Liga ===
==== League table ====
Pos	Team	Pld	W	D	L	GF	GA	GD	Pts	Promotion, qualification or relegation
4	Energie Cottbus	38	18	8	12	64	54	+10	62	Qualification for DFB-Pokal
5	Hansa Rostock	38	18	6	14	54	46	+8	60	
6	Viktoria Köln	38	18	5	15	59	48	+11	59	
7	SC Verl	38	15	12	11	62	55	+7	57	
8	Rot-Weiss Essen	38	16	8	14	55	54	+1	56	

Source: DFB
Rules for classification: 1) Points; 2) Goal difference; 3) Goals scored; 4) Head-to-head results; 5) Head-to-head away goals scored; 6) Away goals scored; 7) Play-off.

==== Results summary ====
Overall								Home						Away					
Pld	W	D	L	GF	GA	GD	Pts	W	D	L	GF	GA	GD	W	D	L	GF	GA	GD
23	11	3	9	37	31	+6	36	7	1	4	23	15	+8	4	2	5	14	16	−2

Last updated: 9 February 2025.
Source: soccerway

===== Results by round =====
Round	1	2	3	4	5	6	7	8	9	10	11	12	13	14	15	16	17	18	19	20	21	22	23	24	25	26
Ground	H	A	A	H	A	H	A	H	A	H	H	A	H	A	H	A	H	A	H	A	H	H	A	H	A	H
Result	L	W	W	W	L	W	L	W	L	L	D	D	W	L	L	L	W	W	W	W	W	L	D			
Position	16	11	3	2	6	4	6	5	6	8	7	8	7	9	11	13	10	8	6	4	4	5	5			

Updated to match(es) played on 9 February 2025. Source: worldfootball
A = Away; H = Home; W = Win; D = Draw; L = Loss

==== Matches ====
The match schedule was released on 9 July 2024.

4 August 2024 1	Viktoria Köln	1–2	Dynamo Dresden	Cologne
13:30	Güler 82'	Report	Daferner 47' (pen.); Kutschke 78'	Stadium: Sportpark Höhenberg; Attendance: 6,175; Referee: Florian Badstübner

10 August 2024 2	Waldhof Mannheim	1–2	Viktoria Köln	Mannheim
14:00	Shipnoski 41'	Report	Lobinger 53'; S. El Mala 67'	Stadium: Carl-Benz-Stadion; Attendance: 10,729; Referee: Jarno Wienefeld

25 August 2024 3	1860 Munich	1–3	Viktoria Köln	Munich
13:30	Ott 68'	Report	Henning 26'; S. El Mala 49' Güler 81' (pen.)	Stadium: Grünwalder Stadion; Attendance: 15,000; Referee: Mario Hildenbrand

30 August 2024 4	Viktoria Köln	3–0	Hansa Rostock	Cologne
19:00	Lobinger 6'; Lobinger 65'; Güler 68'	Report		Stadium: Sportpark Höhenberg; Attendance: 6,013; Referee: Fabienne Michel

15 September 2024 5	Alemannia Aachen	1–0	Viktoria Köln	Aachen
19:30	Strujić 45'	Report		Stadium: Tivoli; Attendance: 23,800; Referee: Felix Weller

22 September 2024 6	Viktoria Köln	2–1	SC Verl	Cologne
16:30	Güler 90+3'; Güler 90+6'	Report	Baack 22'	Stadium: Sportpark Höhenberg; Attendance: 2,611; Referee: Justin Hasmann

25 September 2024 7	1. FC Saarbrücken	1–0	Viktoria Köln	Saarbrücken
19:00	Rabihic 76'	Report		Stadium: Ludwigsparkstadion; Attendance: 9,812; Referee: Assad Nouhoum

28 September 2024 8	Viktoria Köln	2–0	Erzgebirge Aue	Cologne
14:00	Lofolomo 42'; M. El Mala 90+4'	Report		Stadium: Sportpark Höhenberg; Attendance: 3,057; Referee: Felix Grund

5 October 2024 9	Rot-Weiss Essen	2–1	Viktoria Köln	Essen
14:00	Kaparos (yellow card) 52'; José-Enrique Ríos Alonso (yellow card) 63'; Schultz (yellow card) 80'; Arslan 84' 90+2' (pen.); Tom Moustier (yellow card) 90+6'	Report	Dietz (yellow card) 45+1'; Handle 73'; May (yellow card) 86'; Dudu (yellow card) 90'; Serhat-Semih Güler (yellow card) 90+3'	Stadium: Stadion an der Hafenstraße; Attendance: 15,537; Referee: (Germany) Florian Heft

19 October 2024 10	Viktoria Köln	3–5	Borussia Dortmund II	Cologne
14:00	Lobinger 25' (pen.) 44'; Vrenezi 42' (pen.); Sticker (yellow card) 57'; Serhat-Semih Güler (yellow card) 78'; Greger (red card) 88'	Report	Franz Roggow 2'; Foti 17'; Paulina (yellow card) 45+2'; Niklas Jessen (yellow card) 47'; Azhil 55' (pen.); Eberwein 82'; Babis Drakas 90+5'	Stadium: Sportpark Höhenberg; Attendance: 3,947; Referee: (Germany) Mario Hildenbrand

22 October 2024 11	Viktoria Köln	4–4	FC Ingolstadt	Cologne
19:00	Henning 20'; Saïd El Mala 24'; Enrique Lofolomo (yellow card) 36'; Florian Engelhardt (yellow card) 38'; Dietz (yellow card) 45+4'; Lobinger 51'; Serhat-Semih Güler 71'	Report	Kopacz 6' (yellow card) 77'; Fröde (yellow card) 36'; Grønning (yellow card) 45+4' (goal) 49' 54'; Lorenz (yellow card) 59'; Kanuric 86'	Stadium: Sportpark Höhenberg; Attendance: 2,582; Referee: (Germany) Kevin Behrens

26 October 2024 12	SpVgg Unterhaching	1–1	Viktoria Köln	Unterhaching
14:00	Andy Breuer 11' (yellow card) 83'; Skarlatidis (yellow card) 28'; Nils Ortel (yellow card) 70'	Report	Kwabe Schulz (yellow card) 18'; Lobinger 66'	Stadium: uhlsport PARK; Attendance: 9,556; Referee: (Germany) Felix Bickel

1 November 2024 13	Viktoria Köln	2–0	VfB Stuttgart II	Cologne
19:00	Saïd El Mala 13'; Dietz (yellow card) 50'; Greger (yellow card) 85'; Sidny Lopes Cabral (yellow card) 90+4'; Serhat-Semih Güler 90+6'	Report	Kaden Amaniampong (yellow card) 1'; Christopher Olivier (yellow card) 73'; Diehl (yellow card) 90+2'	Stadium: Sportpark Höhenberg; Attendance: 3,447; Referee: (Germany) Luca Jürgensen

9 November 2024 14	Arminia Bielefeld	2–0	Viktoria Köln	Bielefeld
16:30	Hilterman (yellow card) 17'; Young 18'; Julian Kania 75' (pen.); Lannert (yellow card) 81'	Report	Lobinger (yellow card) 90+2'	Stadium: SchücoArena; Attendance: 19,692; Referee: (Germany) Christian Ballweg

22 November 2024 15	Viktoria Köln	0–1	Energie Cottbus	Cologne
19:00	Kevin Pytlik (yellow card) 51'; Greger (yellow card) 85'	Report	Pelivan (yellow card) 28' (yellow-red card) 74'; Pronichev 44'	Stadium: Sportpark Höhenberg; Attendance: 4,166; Referee: (Germany) Marc Philip Eckermann

1 December 2024 16	Wehen Wiesbaden	3–1	Viktoria Köln	Wiesbaden
19:30	Bätzner 43'; Taffertshofer (yellow card) 48'; Kaya (yellow card) 50'; Moritz Flotho 54'; Enrique Lofolomo 77' (o.g.)	Report	Enrique Lofolomo (yellow card) 26'; Serhat-Semih Güler 79'	Stadium: BRITA-Arena; Attendance: 3,025; Referee: (Germany) Jarno Wienefeld

8 December 2024 17	Viktoria Köln	2–0	Osnabrück	Cologne
19:30 CET	Lobinger 24' (pen.) (yellow card) 45'; Henning (yellow card) 52'; Gnaase 54' (o.g.)	Report	Gnaase (yellow card) 89'	Stadium: Sportpark Höhenberg; Attendance: 3,621; Referee: (Germany) Daniel Bartnitzki

14 December 2024 18	Hannover 96 II	1–2	Viktoria Köln	Hanover
14:00 CET	Ben Westermeier (yellow card) 24'; Wechsel (yellow card) 70'; Keanu Brandt (yellow card) 90+1'; Eric Uhlmann 90+4'	Report	Florian Engelhardt (yellow card) 39'; Lobinger (yellow card) 61'; Saïd El Mala 67'; Serhat-Semih Güler 71' (pen.); May (yellow card) 84'	Stadium: Eilenriedestadion; Attendance: 1,060; Referee: (Germany) Fabienne Michel

21 December 2024 19	Viktoria Köln	2–0	Sandhausen	Cologne
14:00 CET	Enrique Lofolomo (red card) 53'; Serhat-Semih Güler 59' 90+5'	Report	Iwe (yellow card) 36'; Lang (yellow card) 44' (yellow-red card) 62'; Halimi (red card) 50'; Baumann (yellow card) 81'	Stadium: Sportpark Höhenberg; Attendance: 3,653; Referee: (Germany) Felix Weller

19 January 2025 20	Dynamo Dresden	2–3	Viktoria Köln	Dresden
13:30 CET	Lemmer 40'; Daferner (yellow card) 40'; Kutschke 86'	Report	Serhat-Semih Güler 20'; Saïd El Mala 25'; Lobinger 76'; Dietz (yellow card) 90'	Stadium: Rudolf-Harbig-Stadion; Attendance: 27,783; Referee: (Germany) Assad Nouhoum

24 January 2025 21	Viktoria Köln	1–0	Waldhof Mannheim	Cologne
19:00 CET	Serhat-Semih Güler 39' (pen.); Sidny Lopes Cabral (yellow card) 84'; Dietz (yellow card) 89'	Report	Lohkemper (yellow card) 25'; Bartels (yellow card) 37'; Klünter (yellow card) 37'; Arase (yellow card) 59'	Stadium: Sportpark Höhenberg; Attendance: 4,125; Referee: (Germany) Martin Wilke

1 February 2025 22	Viktoria Köln	1–2	1860 Munich	Cologne
16:30 CET	Saïd El Mala 28'; Pöpperl (yellow card) 39'; Sidny Lopes Cabral (yellow card) 45'; Dietz (yellow card) 75'; Malek El Mala (yellow card) 85' (yellow-red card) 87'	Report	Kwadwo (yellow card) 45'; Philipp (yellow card) 69'; Hobsch 73'; Wolfram 76'; Philipp Maier (yellow card) 89'; Danhof (yellow card) 90+1'	Stadium: Sportpark Höhenberg; Attendance: 5,849; Referee: (Germany) Felix Wagner

9 February 2025 23	Hansa Rostock	1–1	Viktoria Köln	Rostock
13:30 CET	Saïd El Mala 3' (o.g.); Schuster (yellow card) 24'; Lebeau (yellow card) 67'; Pfanne (yellow card) 77'; Ryan Naderi (yellow card) 78'; Neidhart (yellow card) 80'	Report	Lobinger 26'; Florian Engelhardt (yellow card) 68'; Sidny Lopes Cabral (yellow card) 85'; Pöpperl (yellow card) 90'	Stadium: Ostseestadion; Attendance: 23,734; Referee: (Germany) Robin Braun

14 February 2025 24	Viktoria Köln	–	Alemannia Aachen	Cologne
19:00 CET				Stadium: Sportpark Höhenberg

=== Middle Rhine Cup ===
13 November 2024 First Round	Bornheim	1-2	Viktoria Köln	Bornheim
19:30 CET		Report		Stadium: Kunstrasenplatz Bornheim

11 December 2024 Round of 16	TuS Chlodwig Zülpich	2-5	Viktoria Köln	Zülpich
19:00 CET		Report		Stadium: Kunstrasen Zülpich

5 March 2025 Quarter finals	Neunkirchen-Seelscheid	-	Viktoria Köln	Neunkirchen-Seelscheid
19:00 CET				Stadium: Sportplatz Breitscheid
