= Loris Karius =

German footballer (born 1993)

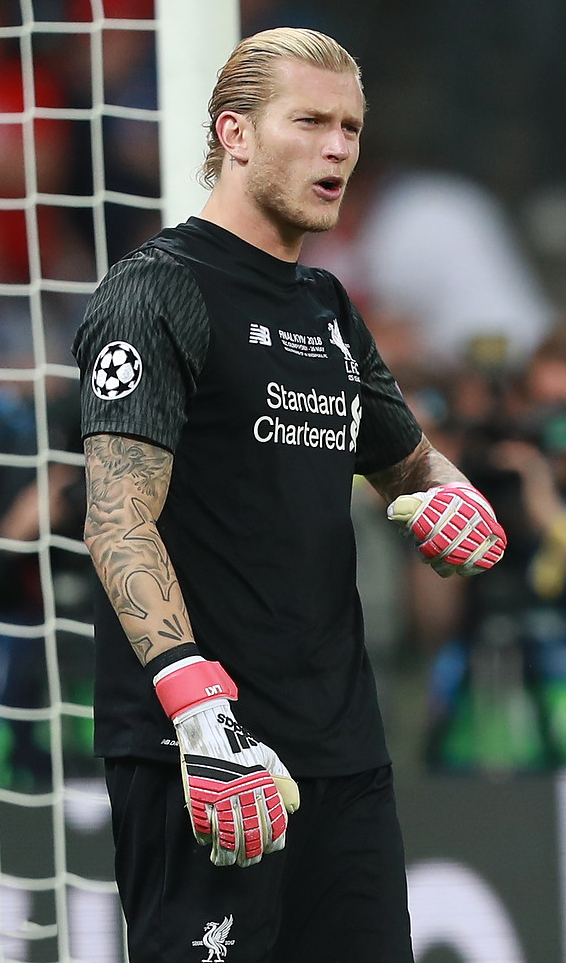
- Karius playing for Liverpool at the 2018 UEFA Champions League final

Personal information
- Full name: Loris Sven Karius
- Date of birth: 22 June 1993 (age 33)
- Place of birth: Biberach an der Riß, Germany
- Height: 1.90 m (6 ft 3 in)
- Position: Goalkeeper

Team information
- Current team: Schalke 04
- Number: 1

Youth career
- 1998–2000: FV Biberach
- 2000–2001: SG Mettenberg
- 2001–2005: SSV Ulm
- 2005–2009: VfB Stuttgart
- 2009–2011: Manchester City

Senior career*
Years	Team	Apps	(Gls)
2011–2013	Mainz 05 II	27	(0)
2012–2016	Mainz 05	91	(0)
2016–2022	Liverpool	29	(0)
2018–2020	→ Beşiktaş (loan)	55	(0)
2020–2021	→ Union Berlin (loan)	4	(0)
2022–2024	Newcastle United	1	(0)
2025–	Schalke 04	44	(0)

International career
2008–2009	Germany U16	3	(0)
2009	Germany U17	1	(0)
2010	Germany U18	1	(0)
2011	Germany U19	1	(0)
2012	Germany U20	1	(0)
2014	Germany U21	1	(0)
- * Club domestic league appearances and goals as of 21 November 2026

Loris Sven Karius (born 22 June 1993) is a German professional footballer who plays as a goalkeeper for Bundesliga club Schalke 04. He represented Germany at youth level.

Karius began his career with VfB Stuttgart before moving to Manchester City in 2009. After two years in Manchester City's youth system, he returned to Germany with Mainz 05. He established himself as the first-choice goalkeeper for the Bundesliga side before transferring to Liverpool in 2016 for a fee of £4.75 million. Karius would go on to play in the 2018 UEFA Champions League final with the club, with Liverpool suffering a heavy 3–1 defeat to Real Madrid, with Karius making two crucial goalkeeping errors that led to goals. He was subsequently loaned out to Beşiktaş and Union Berlin before later joining Newcastle United and Schalke 04.

== Early life ==
Karius was born in Biberach, Baden-Württemberg to Christine and Harald Karius. Harald intended for his son to become a motocross rider, however, his grandfather, Karl, encouraged him to focus on football.

Karius had attended Pestalozzi-Gymnasium Biberach until his move to England in 2009 where he was then privately tutored.

== Club career ==
=== Early career ===
Karius played for local team SG Mettenberg and SSV Ulm before joining VfB Stuttgart, where he rose through the youth ranks and appeared for the German under-16 national team against FYROM in September 2008. Manchester City invited Karius and his family to England after watching him in Germany's under-16 game against Azerbaijan, and completed his signing on 1 July 2009. Karius played for the under-18 and the under-21 Manchester City teams, but did not make a senior appearance during his time in Manchester.

=== Mainz 05 ===
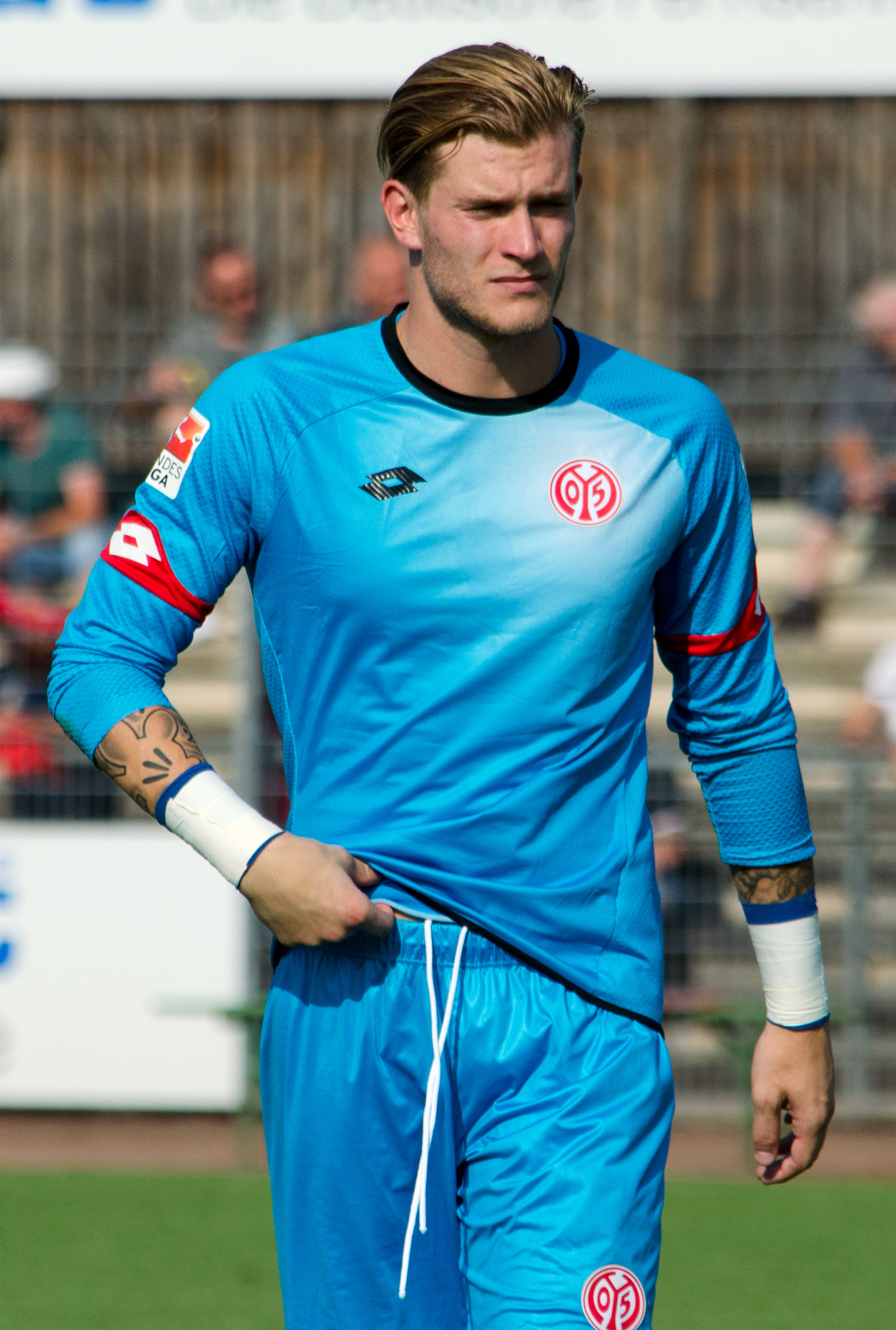
Karius with Mainz 05 in 2015

He was loaned to Mainz 05 in August 2011, where he played for Mainz 05's reserve team, Mainz 05 II, in the Regionalliga. On 11 January 2012, the move was made permanent with Karius committing himself to a two-year deal with an option for a third year that would extend his contract to June 2015. He made his Mainz 05 debut on 1 December 2012 in a Bundesliga match against Hannover 96 when he was substituted for Shawn Parker after goalkeeper Christian Wetklo had been sent off, which, aged 19 years and 5 months, made Karius the youngest goalkeeper ever to play in the Bundesliga for Mainz. He made no further appearances in the 2012–13 season, but established himself as first-choice goalkeeper in the 2013–14 season and on 12 January 2015 signed a three-year contract extension. Karius was ever-present in the 2015–16 season, keeping nine clean sheets, saving two penalties and being voted the second-best goalkeeper in the league in a poll of 235 fellow Bundesliga players, ranking behind only Manuel Peter Neuer.

=== Liverpool ===
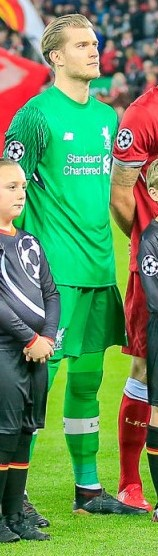
Karius lining up for Liverpool in 2017

==== 2016–17 season ====
On 24 May 2016, Karius signed with Liverpool for a fee of £4.75 million on a five-year deal. He was given the numbered 1 jersey.

Karius made his Liverpool debut in a 3–0 League Cup win over Derby County on 20 September 2016. He played his first Premier League match against Hull City, which ended in a 5–1 victory for the Reds, on 24 September. Karius recorded his first Premier League clean sheet on 17 October, in a 0–0 draw with rivals Manchester United. On 24 October 2016, Jürgen Klopp confirmed that Karius was Liverpool's first-choice goalkeeper, ahead of Simon Mignolet. After two sub-par performances in early December, which included spilling Lewis Cook's tame shot into the path of Nathan Aké to tap home into an empty net to give Bournemouth a 4–3 win, Karius was dropped from the starting eleven. Regarding this decision, Klopp stated he wanted to take Karius "out the firing line," and that "Karius is a young goalkeeper. He will bounce back."

==== 2017–18 season ====
In the 2018 Champions League quarter-final second leg away to Manchester City, with the aggregate scoreline at 3–1 to Liverpool, Karius was involved in a controversial incident when he failed to clear a cross into the penalty area, punching the ball down which ricocheted off teammate James Milner and into the path of City winger Leroy Sané who scored, only for the linesman to give offside.

In Liverpool's Champions League semi-final home leg against Roma, with the scoreline at 0–0, Karius let Aleksandar Kolarov's shot go through his hands with the ball then hitting the crossbar, before Liverpool went on to win 5–2. In the away game in Rome, Karius was involved in a contested incident when he came rushing out of his goal and brought down Edin Džeko inside the penalty area, but instead of a penalty and red card the linesman gave offside in what The Telegraph called "an extremely tight call". Minutes later, Karius parried a Roma shot into the path of Džeko which levelled the score for Roma at 2–2, before the game finished 4–2 to Roma but 7–6 to Liverpool on aggregate.

==== 2018 Champions League final ====
Karius started for Liverpool against Real Madrid in the 2018 UEFA Champions League final, which his side lost 3–1. He was deemed at fault for two of the goals that Liverpool conceded, the first and third; the first when his throw was blocked by Karim Benzema and deflected into the net; the second when he mishandled Gareth Bale's 40-yard strike.

After the match, Karius wept and tearfully apologised to Liverpool fans who remained in the stands. He also stated that his mistakes "lost the team the final".

After the match, Karius received online death threats, primarily on Twitter, which prompted Merseyside Police to launch an investigation. Five days later, Karius underwent an examination at Massachusetts General Hospital in Boston. Medics concluded he had suffered a concussion from an elbow to his head, reportedly from Sergio Ramos just minutes before his first mistake. Doctors, however, did not pinpoint the exact moment he was concussed.

According to doctor Ross Zafonte, it was possible that the concussion affected his performance, and had made it difficult for him to clearly see moving objects. Later, on 6 July, at the start of pre season, Klopp stated that Karius was "100% influenced by his concussion", leading to his errors, with Klopp saying "We don't use it as an excuse, we use it as an explanation. For me, it's 100% the explanation [referencing his performance]. He was influenced by that knock – that is 100%".

==== Loans ====
In July 2018, Liverpool broke the world transfer fee record for a goalkeeper when they signed Brazilian goalkeeper Alisson Becker for an initial fee of €62.5 million (£56 million), potentially rising to €72 million (£66.8 million) with performance-based bonuses. The signing effectively relegated Karius to a backup role. On 25 August 2018, Karius joined Turkish club Beşiktaş on a two-year loan move. On 8 December 2018, he made several saves against Alanyaspor in a scoreless draw. In March 2019, he sought legal action against Beşiktaş for back payment of four months' wages which he alleged the club had failed to pay him. On 4 May 2020, Karius terminated his contract with the Turkish outfit due to continuing issues regarding unpaid wages and after completing the majority of the two years agreed.

On 28 September, Karius was loaned to German side Union Berlin for the 2020–21 season. On 22 December 2020, Karius made his debut in a 3–2 defeat against SC Paderborn in the German DFB Pokal. On 13 February 2021, he made his first start in the Bundesliga for Union Berlin in a goalless draw against Schalke 04. In July 2021, Karius returned to Liverpool. However, manager Jürgen Klopp stated in January 2022 that Karius would not be included in the squad; he made no further official appearances for the club until the end of his contract. It was confirmed in June that Karius would leave the club when his contract expired at the end of the month.

=== Newcastle United ===
On 12 September 2022, Karius signed for Newcastle United on an initial contract until January 2023, which was later extended until the end of the season. On 26 February 2023, despite having not made a prior appearance for Newcastle, Karius made his debut for the club in the 2023 EFL Cup final in a 2–0 loss against Manchester United. This appearance came about due to first-choice Nick Pope receiving a red card against Liverpool on 18 February, and backup Martin Dúbravka being cup-tied having appeared for Newcastle's cup final opponent earlier in the season whilst on loan. The match was Karius's first in two years and his first for an English club since the 2018 UEFA Champions League final. Despite the result, Karius was praised for his performance, making eight saves during the contest. On 9 July 2023, the club announced he had signed a one-year extension.

On 24 February 2024, Karius made his first Premier League appearance in six seasons, in a 4–1 loss to Arsenal. Karius was not expected to start the match, but both goalkeepers ahead of him were unavailable, since Pope had been injured since November 2023 and Dúbravka had been ruled out with illness on the day of the match. At the end of the season, Newcastle decided not to offer a new contract to Karius, and he departed from the club on 1 July 2024.

=== Schalke 04 ===
In January 2025, Karius joined the German second division side FC Schalke 04 as a free agent. Following the departure of Ron-Thorben Hoffmann, the club was in need of a new challenger for their first-choice goalkeeper Justin Heekeren. According to coach Kees van Wonderen Karius was intended to be Schalke's number two, behind Heekeren. From the end of February 2025, Karius initially displaced Heekeren from goal and played four games with the team, but was injured at the end of March in his fourth game against SpVgg Greuther Fürth. The injury took him out for the rest of the season. Karius' contract, which was initially due to expire after the season, was extended in June 2025 for another two years until 2027. In June 2026, his contract with Schalke was extended until June 2028.

On September 5, 2026, Karius had delivered an outstanding performance as Schalke 04 held FC Bayern Munich to a 0–0 [nil-nil] draw on Saturday. The 33-year-old goalkeeper played the entire match, making five saves, including crucial stops against Nathaniel Brown and Harry Kane. He received an 8.0 rating from FotMob and was named Man of the Match by Get German Football News. Karius’ performance also ended Bayern’s incredible 59-match scoring streak. The draw helped Schalke secure their first Bundesliga point in more than three years and ended a run of 12 straight defeats against Bayern, their first positive result against them since 2017. For Karius, the performance represents another major moment in his career revival, as he played a key role in shutting out one of Europe’s most dangerous attacking sides.

== International career ==
Karius represented Germany at all youth levels from under-16 onward, but his appearances were limited due to competition from other goalkeepers.

== Personal life ==
Karius has been in a relationship with Italian television presenter and model Diletta Leotta since 2022. In March 2023, they announced that she was pregnant and expecting their first child. The couple got engaged later in the year, and Leotta gave birth to their first daughter, named Aria, on 16 August 2023. They were married on 22 June 2024, at a private ceremony on the island of Vulcano near Sicily in Leotta's native Italy. In May 2026, the couple welcomed their second child, a boy named Leonardo.

== Career statistics ==
As of match played 21 November 2026

Appearances and goals by club, season and competition
Club	Season	League			National cup (Note: Includes DFB-Pokal, FA Cup and Turkish Cup)		League cup (Note: Includes EFL Cup)		Europe		Total	
Club	Season	Division	Apps	Goals	Apps	Goals	Apps	Goals	Apps	Goals	Apps	Goals
Mainz 05 II	2011–12	Regionalliga West	18	0	—		—		—		18	0
Mainz 05 II	2012–13	Regionalliga Südwest	6	0	—		—		—		6	0
Mainz 05 II	2013–14	Regionalliga Südwest	3	0	—		—		—		3	0
Mainz 05 II	Total		27	0	—		—		—		27	0
Mainz 05	2012–13	Bundesliga	1	0	0	0	—		—		1	0
Mainz 05	2013–14	Bundesliga	23	0	0	0	—		—		23	0
Mainz 05	2014–15	Bundesliga	33	0	1	0	—		2 (Note: Appearances in UEFA Europa League)	0	36	0
Mainz 05	2015–16	Bundesliga	34	0	2	0	—		—		36	0
Mainz 05	Total		91	0	3	0	—		2	0	96	0
Liverpool	2016–17	Premier League	10	0	3	0	3	0	—		16	0
Liverpool	2017–18	Premier League	19	0	1	0	0	0	13 (Note: Appearances in UEFA Champions League)	0	33	0
Liverpool	2021–22	Premier League	0	0	0	0	0	0	0	0	0	0
Liverpool	Total		29	0	4	0	3	0	13	0	49	0
Beşiktaş (loan)	2018–19	Süper Lig	30	0	0	0	—		5	0	35	0
Beşiktaş (loan)	2019–20	Süper Lig	25	0	2	0	—		5	0	32	0
Beşiktaş (loan)	Total		55	0	2	0	—		10	0	67	0
Union Berlin (loan)	2020–21	Bundesliga	4	0	1	0	—		—		5	0
Newcastle United	2022–23	Premier League	0	0	0	0	1	0	—		1	0
Newcastle United	2023–24	Premier League	1	0	0	0	0	0	0	0	1	0
Newcastle United	Total		1	0	0	0	1	0	0	0	2	0
Schalke 04	2024–25	2. Bundesliga	4	0	—		—		—		4	0
Schalke 04	2025–26	2. Bundesliga	30	0	1	0	—		—		31	0
Schalke 04	2026–27	Bundesliga	10	0	2	0	—		—		12	0
Schalke 04	Total		44	0	3	0	—		—		47	0
Career total			251	0	13	0	4	0	25	0	293	0

== Honours ==
Liverpool

- UEFA Champions League runner-up: 2017–18

Newcastle United

- EFL Cup runner-up: 2022–23

Schalke 04

- 2. Bundesliga: 2025–26

Individual

- German Football Ambassador award.
