= 2024–25 FC Schalke 04 season =

Schalke 04
2024–25 season
- CEO: Matthias Tillmann
- Head coach: Karel Geraerts (until 21 September); Jakob Fimpel (interim, from 21 September to 6 October); Kees van Wonderen (from 6 October to 3 May); Jakob Fimpel (interim, from 3 May)
- Stadium: Veltins-Arena
- 2. Bundesliga: 14th
- DFB-Pokal: Second round
- Top goalscorer: League: Moussa Sylla (16); All: Moussa Sylla (16)
- Average home league attendance: 61,639
- Biggest win: 5–1 v Braunschweig (H); 2. Bundesliga, 3 August 2024
- Biggest defeat: 0–3 v Augsburg (A); DFB Pokal, 29 October 2024; 0–3 v Kaiserslautern (H); 2. Bundesliga, 29 November 2024; 2–5 v Magdeburg (H); 2. Bundesliga, 1 February 2025
Home colours	Away colours	Third colours
- All statistics correct as of end of the 2024-25 season.

The 2024–25 FC Schalke 04 season is their 121st season in football and their eighth season in the 2. Bundesliga. In addition to the domestic league, Schalke also participates in this season's edition of the domestic cup, the DFB-Pokal. This is the 24th season for Schalke in the Veltins-Arena, located in Gelsenkirchen, North Rhine-Westphalia.

== Players ==
Note: Players' appearances and goals only in their Schalke career.

As of end of 2024–25 season

No.	Player	Nat	Pos	Age	Contract		Signed from	League		Total	
No.	Player	Nat	Pos	Age	began	ends	Signed from	Apps	Goals	Apps	Goals
Goalkeepers
27	Loris Karius	(Germany)	GK	32	Jan 2025	Jun 2025	Free agent	4	0	4	0
28	Justin Heekeren	(Germany)	GK	24	Jul 2022	Jun 2026	Rot-Weiß Oberhausen	31	0	32	0
32	Luca Podlech	(Germany)	GK	20	Jul 2024	Jun 2028	Schalke 04 U19	0	0	0	0
34	Michael Langer	(Austria)	GK	40	Aug 2017	Jun 2025	(Sweden) IFK Norrköping	8	0	8	0
–	Ralf Fährmann	(Germany)	GK	36	Jul 2011	Jun 2025	Eintracht Frankfurt	227	0	289	0
Defenders
2	Felipe Sánchez	(Argentina)	DF	21	Jul 2024	Jun 2028	(Argentina) Gimnasia LP	5	0	7	0
5	Derry Murkin	(England)	DF	25	Aug 2023	Jun 2026	(Netherlands) Volendam	54	1	57	1
17	Adrian Gantenbein	(Switzerland)	DF	24	Jul 2024	Jun 2028	(Switzerland) Winterthur	20	1	20	1
22	Ibrahima Cissé	(Mali)	DF	24	Jul 2022	Jun 2026	(Belgium) Gent	8	1	9	1
23	Mehmet-Can Aydın	(Turkey)	DF	23	Jul 2021	Jun 2025	Schalke 04 II	69	1	74	1
26	Tomáš Kalas	(Czech Republic)	DF	32	Aug 2023	Jun 2027	(England) Bristol City	48	2	50	2
30	Anton Donkor	(Germany)	DF	27	Jul 2024	Jun 2027	Eintracht Braunschweig	26	0	28	0
31	Taylan Bulut	(Germany)	DF	19	Jul 2024	Jun 2029	Schalke 04 U19	25	1	27	1
33	Vitalie Becker	(Germany)	DF	20	Jul 2024	Jun 2027	Schalke 04 U19	0	0	0	0
35	Marcin Kamiński	(Poland)	DF	33	Jul 2021	Jun 2025	VfB Stuttgart	96	7	102	9
Midfielders
6	Ron Schallenberg	(Germany)	MF	26	Jul 2023	Jun 2026	SC Paderborn	57	3	60	3
7	Paul Seguin	(Germany)	MF	30	Jul 2023	Jun 2026	Union Berlin	55	5	57	6
14	Janik Bachmann	(Germany)	MF	29	Jul 2024	Jun 2027	Hansa Rostock	25	3	27	3
16	Mauro Zalazar	(Uruguay)	MF	20	Aug 2024	Jun 2028	(Spain) Granada U19	0	0	1	0
20	Arış Bayındır	(Germany)	MF	18	Jul 2024	Jun 2028	RB Leipzig U19	0	0	0	0
25	Aymen Barkok	(Morocco)	MF	27	Feb 2025	Jun 2025	Mainz 05	6	0	6	0
29	Tobias Mohr	(Germany)	MF	29	Jul 2022	Jun 2025	1. FC Heidenheim	63	4	69	5
37	Max Grüger	(Germany)	MF	20	Jul 2024	Jun 2028	Schalke 04 U19	23	1	24	1
–	Dominick Drexler	(Germany)	MF	35	Jul 2021	Jun 2025	1. FC Köln	61	8	65	11
Forwards
8	Amin Younes	(Germany)	FW	31	Jul 2024	Jun 2026	Free agent	25	2	25	2
9	Moussa Sylla	(Mali)	FW	25	Jul 2024	Jun 2028	(France) Pau	27	16	28	16
10	Pape Meïssa Ba	(Senegal)	FW	27	Jan 2025	Jun 2028	(France) Grenoble	13	2	13	2
15	Emil Højlund	(Denmark)	FW	20	Jul 2024	Jun 2028	(Denmark) Copenhagen	10	0	10	0
18	Christopher Antwi-Adjei	(Ghana)	FW	31	Aug 2024	Jun 2026	VfL Bochum	20	1	20	1
19	Kenan Karaman (captain)	(Turkey)	FW	31	Sep 2022	Jun 2028	(Turkey) Beşiktaş	79	27	84	29
24	Ilyes Hamache	(France)	FW	22	Aug 2024	Jun 2028	(France) Valenciennes	11	0	11	0
39	Peter Remmert	(Germany)	FW	19	Jul 2024	Jun 2028	VfL Osnabrück U19	2	0	2	0

== Transfers ==
=== In ===
Player	Nat	Pos	From	Type	Transfer fee	Date	Ref
Moussa Sylla	(Mali)	FW	(France) Pau	Transfer	€2,500,000	1 Jul 2024	
Adrian Gantenbein	(Switzerland)	DF	(Switzerland) Winterthur	Transfer	€300,000	1 Jul 2024	
Arış Bayındır	(Germany)	MF	(Germany) RB Leipzig U19	Transfer	€200,000	1 Jul 2024	
Janik Bachmann	(Germany)	MF	(Germany) Hansa Rostock	End of contract	—	1 Jul 2024	
Anton Donkor	(Germany)	DF	(Germany) Eintracht Braunschweig	End of contract	—	1 Jul 2024	
Ron-Thorben Hoffmann	(Germany)	GK	(Germany) Eintracht Braunschweig	End of contract	—	1 Jul 2024	
Peter Remmert	(Germany)	FW	(Germany) VfL Osnabrück U19	End of contract	—	1 Jul 2024	
Martin Wasinski	(Belgium)	DF	(Belgium) Charleroi	End of contract	—	1 Jul 2024	
Amin Younes	(Germany)	FW	Free agent	End of contract	—	1 Jul 2024	
Vitalie Becker	(Germany)	DF	(Germany) Schalke 04 U19	Promoted	—	1 Jul 2024	
Taylan Bulut	(Germany)	DF	(Germany) Schalke 04 U19	Promoted	—	1 Jul 2024	
Max Grüger	(Germany)	MF	(Germany) Schalke 04 U19	Promoted	—	1 Jul 2024	
Emmanuel Gyamfi	(Germany)	MF	(Germany) Schalke 04 II	Promoted	—	1 Jul 2024	
Luca Podlech	(Germany)	GK	(Germany) Schalke 04 U19	Promoted	—	1 Jul 2024	
Paul Pöpperl	(Germany)	MF	(Germany) Schalke 04 II	Promoted	—	1 Jul 2024	
Mehmet-Can Aydın	(Turkey)	DF	(Turkey) Trabzonspor	Loan return	—	1 Jul 2024	
Justin Heekeren	(Germany)	GK	(Belgium) Patro Eisden	Loan return	—	1 Jul 2024	
Sebastian Polter	(Germany)	FW	(Germany) Darmstadt 98	Loan return	—	1 Jul 2024	
Felipe Sánchez	(Argentina)	DF	(Argentina) Gimnasia LP	Transfer	€1,200,000	9 Jul 2024	
Emil Højlund	(Denmark)	FW	(Denmark) Copenhagen	Transfer	€300,000	16 Jul 2024	
Ilyes Hamache	(France)	FW	(France) Valenciennes	Transfer	€200,000	20 Aug 2024	
Mauro Zalazar	(Uruguay)	MF	(Spain) Granada U19	Transfer	€100,000	20 Aug 2024	
Steve Noode	(Cameroon)	DF	(Cameroon) A.S. International	Transfer	Free	20 Aug 2024	
Christopher Antwi-Adjei	(Ghana)	FW	(Germany) VfL Bochum	End of contract	—	23 Aug 2024	
Sōichirō Kōzuki	(Japan)	FW	(Poland) Górnik Zabrze	Loan return	—	1 Sep 2024	
Loris Karius	(Germany)	GK	Free agent	End of contract	—	14 Jan 2025	
Pape Meïssa Ba	(Senegal)	FW	(France) Grenoble	Transfer	€300,000	29 Jan 2025	
Aymen Barkok	(Morocco)	MF	(Germany) Mainz 05	Transfer	Free	3 Feb 2025	

=== Out ===
Player	Nat	Pos	To	Type	Transfer fee	Date	Ref
Assan Ouédraogo	(Germany)	MF	(Germany) RB Leipzig	Transfer	€10,000,000	1 Jul 2024	
Keke Topp	(Germany)	FW	(Germany) Werder Bremen	Transfer	€2,000,000	1 Jul 2024	
Marius Müller	(Germany)	GK	(Germany) VfL Wolfsburg	Transfer	€1,500,000	1 Jul 2024	
Cédric Brunner	(Switzerland)	DF	Free agent	End of contract	—	1 Jul 2024	
Blendi Idrizi	(Kosovo)	MF	Free agent	End of contract	—	1 Jul 2024	
Danny Latza	(Germany)	MF	Free agent	End of contract	—	1 Jul 2024	
Thomas Ouwejan	(Netherlands)	DF	(Netherlands) NEC Nijmegen	End of contract	—	1 Jul 2024	
Simon Terodde	(Germany)	FW	Retired	End of contract	—	1 Jul 2024	
Emmanuel Gyamfi	(Germany)	MF	(Netherlands) VVV-Venlo	Loan	—	1 Jul 2024	
Paul Pöpperl	(Germany)	MF	(Netherlands) VVV-Venlo	Loan	—	1 Jul 2024	
Darko Churlinov	(North Macedonia)	MF	(England) Burnley	Loan return	—	1 Jul 2024	
Yusuf Kabadayı	(Germany)	FW	(Germany) Bayern Munich	Loan return	—	1 Jul 2024	
Brandon Soppy	(France)	DF	(Italy) Atalanta	Loan return	—	1 Jul 2024	
Leo Greiml	(Austria)	DF	(Netherlands) NAC Breda	Transfer	€300,000	1 Aug 2024	
Sebastian Polter	(Germany)	FW	(Germany) Eintracht Braunschweig	Contract dissolved	—	22 Aug 2024	
Henning Matriciani	(Germany)	DF	(Germany) Waldhof Mannheim	Loan	—	26 Aug 2024	
Timo Baumgartl	(Germany)	DF	Free agent	Contract dissolved	—	29 Aug 2024	
Sōichirō Kōzuki	(Japan)	FW	(Germany) 1860 Munich	Transfer	€20,000	2 Sep 2024	
Paul Pöpperl	(Germany)	MF	(Germany) Viktoria Köln	Loan	—	3 Jan 2025	
Lino Tempelmann	(Germany)	MF	(Germany) Eintracht Braunschweig	Loan	—	6 Jan 2025	
Ron-Thorben Hoffmann	(Germany)	GK	(Germany) Eintracht Braunschweig	Loan	—	14 Jan 2025	
Bryan Lasme	(France)	FW	(Switzerland) Grasshopper	Loan	—	14 Jan 2025	
Martin Wasinski	(Belgium)	DF	(Belgium) Genk	Loan	—	24 Jan 2025	
Steve Noode	(Cameroon)	DF	(Austria) SCR Altach	Loan	—	30 Jan 2025	

=== New contracts ===
Player	Nat	Pos	Contract until	Date	Ref
Michael Langer	(Austria)	GK	Jun 2025	12 Jun 2024	
Kenan Karaman	(Turkey)	FW	Jun 2028	5 Jul 2024	
Tomáš Kalas	(Czech Republic)	DF	Jun 2027	31 Jul 2024	
Justin Heekeren	(Germany)	GK	Jun 2026	18 Nov 2024	
Max Grüger	(Germany)	MF	Jun 2028	23 Dec 2024	
Luca Podlech	(Germany)	GK	Jun 2028	2 Jan 2025	
Taylan Bulut	(Germany)	DF	Jun 2029	17 Feb 2025	

== Friendly matches ==
Win Draw Loss

3 July 2024 1	SSVg Velbert	0–7	Schalke 04	Ratingen, Germany
18:00 CEST (UTC+2)		Report	Polter 9'; Younes 35'; Sylla 62', 66'; Lasme 71'; Kalas 75'; Karaman 83'	Stadium: Stadion Ratingen; Attendance: 3,000; Referee: Martin Ulankiewicz

6 July 2024 2	Kickers Emden	1–0	Schalke 04	Meppen, Germany
15:00 CEST (UTC+2)	Steffens 12'	Report		Stadium: Hänsch-Arena; Attendance: 3,184; Referee: Maximilian Nie-Hoegen
Note: The match lasted 45 minutes.

6 July 2024 3	SV Meppen	2–4	Schalke 04	Meppen, Germany
16:00 CEST (UTC+2)	Schepp 9'; Janssen 23'	Report	Sylla 4', 13', 45'; Mohr 34'	Stadium: Hänsch-Arena; Attendance: 3,184; Referee: Lennart Kernchen
Note: The match lasted 45 minutes.

10 July 2024 4	Schalke 04	2–4	Midtjylland	Saalfelden, Austria
18:00 CEST (UTC+2)	Sylla 15'; Seguin 36'	Report	Brynhildsen 21'; Priske 54'; Kamara 62' (pen.); Gogorza 67'	Stadium: SaalfeldenArena; Attendance: 600; Referee: Arnes Talic
Note: The match ended after 82 minutes due to bad weather.

13 July 2024 5	Schalke 04	2–2	Dynamo Kyiv	Mittersill, Austria
16:00 CEST (UTC+2)	Karaman 30'; Sylla 57'	Report	Tsarenko 14'; Vanat 66'	Stadium: Stadion Mittersill; Attendance: 700; Referee: Christopher Jäger

18 July 2024 6	SC Verl	0–1	Schalke 04	Verl, Germany
18:30 CEST (UTC+2)		Report	Aydın 24'	Stadium: Sportclub Arena; Attendance: 3,089; Referee: Yannick Rupert

19 July 2024 7	Schalke 04	0–2	Utrecht	Gelsenkirchen, Germany
13:00 CEST (UTC+2)		Report	Ohio 78'; Descotte 83'	Stadium: Training ground Attendance: 0 Referee: Cengiz Kabalakli

24 July 2024 8	Schalke 04	0–0	Twente	Marl, Germany
18:30 CEST (UTC+2)		Report		Stadium: Evonik Sportpark; Attendance: 3,000; Referee: Timo Gansloweit

27 July 2024 9	Schalke 04	0–2	Leeds United	Hamm, Germany
15:30 CEST (UTC+2)		Report	Joseph 57'; Piroe 66'	Stadium: Hellmeister Arena; Attendance: 0 Referee: Felix Weller

4 September 2024 10	Schalke 04	2–1	NAC Breda	Gelsenkirchen, Germany
18:00 CEST (UTC+2)	Wasinski 28'; Lasme 39'	Report	Ómarsson 11'	Stadium: Parkstadion; Attendance: 1,400; Referee: Sören Storks

12 October 2024 11	Aarau	2–2	Schalke 04	Aarau, Switzerland
17:00 CEST (UTC+2)	Fofana 10'; Odutayo 42'	Report	Højlund 37'; Schallenberg 74'	Stadium: Stadion Brügglifeld; Attendance: 7,525; Referee: Hajrim Qovanaj

14 November 2024 12	Schalke 04	2–1	Alemannia Aachen	Gelsenkirchen, Germany
14:00 CET (UTC+1)	Tempelmann 29'; Tchibara 88'	Report	Strujić 50'	Stadium: Parkstadion; Attendance: 0 Referee: Cengiz Kabalakli

6 January 2025 13	Schalke 04	3–1	Aarau	Belek, Turkey
13:00 CET (UTC+1)	Antwi-Adjei 30'; Lasme 67' (pen.), 79'	Report	Toure 52'	Stadium: Titanic Sports Center; Attendance: 150; Referee: Sercan Sahan

9 January 2025 14	Schalke 04	3–0	Zürich	Belek, Turkey
13:00 CET (UTC+1)	Sylla 7'; Kamiński 10'; Højlund 68' (pen.)	Report		Stadium: Titanic Sports Center; Attendance: 200; Referee: Hakan Yurtseven

19 March 2025 15	Schalke 04	1–0	Groningen	Gelsenkirchen, Germany
18:00 CET (UTC+1)	Barkok 18' (pen.)	Report		Stadium: Parkstadion; Attendance: 1,500; Referee: Timo Gansloweit

== Competitions ==
=== Overview ===
Competition	First match	Last match	Starting round	Final position	Record							
Competition	First match	Last match	Starting round	Final position	Pld	W	D	L	GF	GA	GD	Win %
2. Bundesliga	3 August 2024	18 May 2025	Matchday 1	14th	34	10	8	16	52	62	−10	29.41
DFB-Pokal	17 August 2024	29 October 2024	First round	Second round	2	1	0	1	2	3	−1	50.00
Total					36	11	8	17	54	65	−11	30.56

Last updated: 18 May 2025
Source: Soccerway

=== 2. Bundesliga ===
==== League table ====
Pos	Team	Pld	W	D	L	GF	GA	GD	Pts	Promotion, qualification or relegation
12	Darmstadt 98	34	11	9	14	56	55	+1	42	
13	Greuther Fürth	34	10	9	15	45	59	−14	39	
14	Schalke 04	34	10	8	16	52	62	−10	38	
15	Preußen Münster	34	8	12	14	40	43	−3	36	
16	Eintracht Braunschweig (O)	34	8	11	15	38	64	−26	35	Qualification for relegation play-offs

Source: Bundesliga
Rules for classification: 1) Points; 2) Goal difference; 3) Goals scored; 4) Head-to-head results; 5) Head-to-head away goals scored; 6) Away goals scored; 7) Play-off.
(Rules 4–6 only apply after home and away matches have been played between the tied teams.)
(O) Play-off winners

==== Results summary ====
Overall								Home						Away					
Pld	W	D	L	GF	GA	GD	Pts	W	D	L	GF	GA	GD	W	D	L	GF	GA	GD
34	10	8	16	52	62	−10	38	6	3	8	31	35	−4	4	5	8	21	27	−6

Last updated: 18 May 2025.
Source: Soccerway

==== Results by round ====
Round	1	2	3	4	5	6	7	8	9	10	11	12	13	14	15	16	17	18	19	20	21	22	23	24	25	26	27	28	29	30	31	32	33	34
Ground	H	A	A	H	A	H	A	H	A	H	A	H	A	H	A	H	A	A	H	H	A	H	A	H	A	H	A	H	A	H	A	H	A	H
Result	W	L	D	L	L	L	W	D	L	L	D	W	D	L	W	D	W	D	W	L	L	W	L	W	W	L	D	W	L	D	L	L	L	L
Position	1	9	9	12	13	16	13	13	14	15	16	14	13	14	14	14	13	13	13	13	14	11	13	12	11	11	11	11	11	13	13	13	13	14
Points	3	3	4	4	4	4	7	8	8	8	9	12	13	13	16	17	20	21	24	24	24	27	27	30	33	33	34	37	37	38	38	38	38	38

Updated to match(es) played on 18 May 2025. Source: DFB
A = Away; H = Home; W = Win; D = Draw; L = Loss

==== Matches ====
3 August 2024 1	Schalke 04	5–1	Eintracht Braunschweig	Gelsenkirchen
20:30 CEST (UTC+2)	Mohr 9'; Sylla 25', 82'; Karaman 73', 83'	Report	Ehlers 33'	Stadium: Veltins-Arena; Attendance: 60,534; Referee: Tobias Stieler

10 August 2024 2	1. FC Nürnberg	3–1	Schalke 04	Nuremberg
13:00 CEST (UTC+2)	Schleimer 47'; Jander 56'; Lubach 77'	Report	Cissé 45+1'	Stadium: Max-Morlock-Stadion; Attendance: 49,923; Referee: Nicolas Winter

25 August 2024 3	1. FC Magdeburg	2–2	Schalke 04	Magdeburg
13:30 CEST (UTC+2)	Mathisen 40'; Kaars 45+2'	Report	Sylla 8'; Karaman 76'	Stadium: MDCC-Arena; Attendance: 27,146; Referee: Timo Gerach

1 September 2024 4	Schalke 04	1–3	1. FC Köln	Gelsenkirchen
13:30 CEST (UTC+2)	Karaman 66' (pen.)	Report	Downs 25'; Maina 45+1'; Lemperle 46'	Stadium: Veltins-Arena; Attendance: 61,624; Referee: Sven Jablonski

13 September 2024 5	Karlsruher SC	2–0	Schalke 04	Karlsruhe
18:30 CEST (UTC+2)	Zivzivadze 45+3', 73'	Report		Stadium: Wildparkstadion; Attendance: 31,845; Referee: Tobias Welz

20 September 2024 6	Schalke 04	3–5	Darmstadt 98	Gelsenkirchen
18:30 CEST (UTC+2)	Mohr 14'; Sylla 34'; Schallenberg 38'	Report	Hornby 45+5' (pen.); Lidberg 56', 76', 87'; López 90+7'	Stadium: Veltins-Arena; Attendance: 61,021; Referee: Florian Heft

28 September 2024 7	Preußen Münster	1–2	Schalke 04	Münster
20:30 CEST (UTC+2)	Makridis 53'	Report	Sylla 67', 74'	Stadium: Preußenstadion; Attendance: 12,422; Referee: Robin Braun

5 October 2024 8	Schalke 04	2–2	Hertha BSC	Gelsenkirchen
20:30 CEST (UTC+2)	Karaman 24'; Mohr 33'	Report	Cuisance 9'; Prevljak 72' (pen.)	Stadium: Veltins-Arena; Attendance: 61,939; Referee: Tom Bauer

19 October 2024 9	Hannover 96	1–0	Schalke 04	Hanover
13:00 CEST (UTC+2)	Kunze 4'	Report		Stadium: Heinz von Heiden Arena; Attendance: 49,000; Referee: Eric Weisbach

26 October 2024 10	Schalke 04	3–4	Greuther Fürth	Gelsenkirchen
13:00 CEST (UTC+2)	Grüger 32'; Seguin 78'; Bulut 90+2'	Report	Massimo 23', 39'; Michalski 27'; Futkeu 62'	Stadium: Veltins-Arena; Attendance: 60,344; Referee: Patrick Alt

1 November 2024 11	SSV Ulm	0–0	Schalke 04	Ulm
18:30 CET (UTC+1)		Report		Stadium: Donaustadion; Attendance: 17,400; Referee: Felix Prigan

10 November 2024 12	Schalke 04	2–0	Jahn Regensburg	Gelsenkirchen
13:30 CET (UTC+1)	Karaman 16'; Sylla 53'	Report		Stadium: Veltins-Arena; Attendance: 60,755; Referee: Patrick Schwengers

23 November 2024 13	Hamburger SV	2–2	Schalke 04	Hamburg
20:30 CET (UTC+1)	Richter 29'; Königsdörffer 30'	Report	Younes 57'; Karaman 74'	Stadium: Volksparkstadion; Attendance: 57,000; Referee: Wolfgang Haslberger

29 November 2024 14	Schalke 04	0–3	1. FC Kaiserslautern	Gelsenkirchen
18:30 CET (UTC+1)		Report	Ache 12'; Hanslik 52'; Yokota 61'	Stadium: Veltins-Arena; Attendance: 62,075; Referee: Robin Braun

6 December 2024 15	SC Paderborn	2–4	Schalke 04	Paderborn
18:30 CET (UTC+1)	Kostons 12'; Götze 52'	Report	Sylla 23'; Karaman 43', 69'; Bachmann 88'	Stadium: Home Deluxe Arena; Attendance: 15,000; Referee: Robert Kampka

14 December 2024 16	Schalke 04	1–1	Fortuna Düsseldorf	Gelsenkirchen
13:00 CET (UTC+1)	Sylla 72'	Report	Kownacki 62'	Stadium: Veltins-Arena; Attendance: 61,955; Referee: Florian Heft

20 December 2024 17	SV Elversberg	1–4	Schalke 04	Spiesen-Elversberg
18:30 CET (UTC+1)	Sickinger 25'	Report	Karaman 11'; Sylla 55', 75'; Schallenberg 67'	Stadium: Waldstadion an der Kaiserlinde; Attendance: 9,323; Referee: Eric Weisbach

18 January 2025 18	Eintracht Braunschweig	0–0	Schalke 04	Braunschweig
13:00 CET (UTC+1)		Report		Stadium: Eintracht-Stadion; Attendance: 22,389; Referee: Florian Lechner

25 January 2025 19	Schalke 04	3–1	1. FC Nürnberg	Gelsenkirchen
13:00 CET (UTC+1)	Karaman 7'; Sylla 15', 45'	Report	Tzimas 17'	Stadium: Veltins-Arena; Attendance: 62,278; Referee: Max Burda

1 February 2025 20	Schalke 04	2–5	1. FC Magdeburg	Gelsenkirchen
20:30 CET (UTC+1)	Gantenbein 69'; Bachmann 90+3'	Report	Kaars 29', 45+2', 56', 74'; Hercher 65'	Stadium: Veltins-Arena; Attendance: 61,681; Referee: Patrick Alt

9 February 2025 21	1. FC Köln	1–0	Schalke 04	Cologne
13:30 CET (UTC+1)	Downs 43'	Report		Stadium: RheinEnergieStadion; Attendance: 50,000; Referee: Tobias Welz

16 February 2025 22	Schalke 04	2–1	Karlsruher SC	Gelsenkirchen
13:30 CET (UTC+1)	Bachmann 6'; Ba 34'	Report	Jensen 25'	Stadium: Veltins-Arena; Attendance: 61,804; Referee: Robin Braun

23 February 2025 23	Darmstadt 98	2–0	Schalke 04	Darmstadt
13:30 CET (UTC+1)	Lidberg 3', 5'	Report		Stadium: Merck-Stadion am Böllenfalltor; Attendance: 17,810; Referee: Nicolas Winter

28 February 2025 24	Schalke 04	1–0	Preußen Münster	Gelsenkirchen
18:30 CET (UTC+1)	Ba 86'	Report		Stadium: Veltins-Arena; Attendance: 62,077; Referee: Deniz Aytekin

8 March 2025 25	Hertha BSC	1–2	Schalke 04	Berlin
13:00 CET (UTC+1)	Reese 51'	Report	Kalas 27'; Karaman 55' (pen.)	Stadium: Olympiastadion; Attendance: 70,159; Referee: Timo Gerach

14 March 2025 26	Schalke 04	1–2	Hannover 96	Gelsenkirchen
18:30 CET (UTC+1)	Antwi-Adjei 27'	Report	Rochelt 87'; Nielsen 88'	Stadium: Veltins-Arena; Attendance: 62,077; Referee: Richard Hempel

30 March 2025 27	Greuther Fürth	3–3	Schalke 04	Fürth
13:30 CEST (UTC+2)	Massimo 11'; Consbruch 26'; Srbeny 54'	Report	Karaman 9'; Younes 84'; Sylla 90+6'	Stadium: Sportpark Ronhof Thomas Sommer; Attendance: 16,126; Referee: Tom Bauer

6 April 2025 28	Schalke 04	2–1	SSV Ulm	Gelsenkirchen
13:30 CEST (UTC+2)	Seguin 59'; Kamiński 88'	Report	Higl 40'	Stadium: Veltins-Arena; Attendance: 61,922; Referee: Lukas Benen

13 April 2025 29	Jahn Regensburg	2–0	Schalke 04	Regensburg
13:30 CEST (UTC+2)	Kühlwetter 21'; Galjen 90+3'	Report		Stadium: Jahnstadion; Attendance: 15,210; Referee: Wolfgang Haslberger

19 April 2025 30	Schalke 04	2–2	Hamburger SV	Gelsenkirchen
20:30 CEST (UTC+2)	Schallenberg 15'; Sylla 81'	Report	Sahiti 41', 43'	Stadium: Veltins-Arena; Attendance: 62,077; Referee: Harm Osmers

27 April 2025 31	1. FC Kaiserslautern	2–1	Schalke 04	Kaiserslautern
13:30 CEST (UTC+2)	Yokota 35'; Ache 77'	Report	Sylla 61'	Stadium: Fritz-Walter-Stadion; Attendance: 49,327; Referee: Daniel Schlager

2 May 2025 32	Schalke 04	0–2	SC Paderborn	Gelsenkirchen
18:30 CEST (UTC+2)		Report	Obermair 40'; Mehlem 48'	Stadium: Veltins-Arena; Attendance: 62,094; Referee: Robert Schröder

10 May 2025 33	Fortuna Düsseldorf	2–0	Schalke 04	Düsseldorf
13:00 CEST (UTC+2)	Kownacki 57'; van Brederode 78'	Report		Stadium: Merkur Spiel-Arena; Attendance: 51,500; Referee: Michael Bacher

18 May 2025 34	Schalke 04	1–2	SV Elversberg	Gelsenkirchen
15:30 CEST (UTC+2)	Ben Balla 85'	Report	Petkov 20'; Neubauer 47'	Stadium: Veltins-Arena; Attendance: 62,077; Referee: Robert Hartmann

=== DFB-Pokal ===
17 August 2024 1R	VfR Aalen	0–2	Schalke 04	Aalen
15:30 CEST (UTC+2)		Report	Karaman 31'; Mohr 68'	Stadium: Städtisches Waldstadion; Attendance: 10,850; Referee: Felix Brych

29 October 2024 2R	FC Augsburg	3–0	Schalke 04	Augsburg
18:00 CET (UTC+1)	Claude-Maurice 26'; Maier 87'; Essende 90'	Report		Stadium: WWK Arena; Attendance: 27,511; Referee: Frank Willenborg

== Statistics ==
As of end of 2024–25 season

=== Squad statistics ===
A = Appearances, S = Starts, G = Goals, (yellow card) = yellow cards, (red card) = red cards

No.	Player	Nat	Pos	2. Bundesliga					DFB-Pokal					Total				
No.	Player	Nat	Pos	A	S	G	Yellow card	Red card	A	S	G	Yellow card	Red card	A	S	G	Yellow card	Red card
Goalkeepers
27	Loris Karius	(Germany)	GK	4	4	0	0	0	0	0	0	0	0	4	4	0	0	0
28	Justin Heekeren	(Germany)	GK	29	28	0	1	0	1	1	0	0	0	30	29	0	1	0
~~1~~	Ron-Thorben Hoffmann	(Germany)	GK	2	2	0	1	0	1	1	0	0	0	3	3	0	1	0
Defenders
2	Felipe Sánchez	(Argentina)	DF	5	5	0	1	1	2	1	0	1	0	7	6	0	2	1
5	Derry Murkin	(England)	DF	31	28	0	7	0	2	2	0	0	0	33	30	0	7	0
17	Adrian Gantenbein	(Switzerland)	DF	20	9	1	3	1	0	0	0	0	0	20	9	1	3	1
22	Ibrahima Cissé	(Mali)	DF	4	3	1	1	0	0	0	0	0	0	4	3	1	1	0
23	Mehmet-Can Aydın	(Turkey)	DF	29	22	0	4	0	2	2	0	0	0	31	24	0	4	0
26	Tomáš Kalas	(Czech Republic)	DF	24	13	1	1	0	1	1	0	0	0	25	14	1	1	0
30	Anton Donkor	(Germany)	DF	26	6	0	3	0	2	1	0	1	0	28	7	0	4	0
31	Taylan Bulut	(Germany)	DF	24	23	1	4	0	2	2	0	0	0	26	25	1	4	0
35	Marcin Kamiński	(Poland)	DF	27	25	1	5	0	1	1	0	0	0	28	26	1	5	0
41	Tim Schmidt^{U23}	(Germany)	DF	0	0	0	0	0	1	0	0	0	0	1	0	0	0	0
42	Malik Talabidi^{U23}	(Germany)	DF	1	0	0	0	0	0	0	0	0	0	1	0	0	0	0
50	Tidiane Touré^{U23}	(France)	DF	1	0	0	0	0	0	0	0	0	0	1	0	0	0	0
~~21~~	Martin Wasinski	(Belgium)	DF	1	1	0	0	0	2	1	0	0	0	3	2	0	0	0
Midfielders
6	Ron Schallenberg	(Germany)	MF	31	30	3	4	1	1	1	0	0	0	32	31	3	4	1
7	Paul Seguin	(Germany)	MF	25	23	2	8	0	1	0	0	1	0	26	23	2	9	0
14	Janik Bachmann	(Germany)	MF	25	20	3	4	0	2	2	0	1	0	27	22	3	5	0
16	Mauro Zalazar	(Uruguay)	MF	0	0	0	0	0	1	0	0	0	0	1	0	0	0	0
21	Yassin Ben Balla^{U23}	(France)	MF	1	0	1	0	0	0	0	0	0	0	1	0	1	0	0
25	Aymen Barkok	(Morocco)	MF	6	4	0	3	0	0	0	0	0	0	6	4	0	3	0
29	Tobias Mohr	(Germany)	MF	26	19	3	4	0	2	2	1	1	0	28	21	4	5	0
37	Max Grüger	(Germany)	MF	23	17	1	4	1	1	1	0	0	0	24	18	1	4	1
~~27~~	Lino Tempelmann	(Germany)	MF	5	2	0	0	0	0	0	0	0	0	5	2	0	0	0
Forwards
8	Amin Younes	(Germany)	FW	25	15	2	2	0	0	0	0	0	0	25	15	2	2	0
9	Moussa Sylla	(Mali)	FW	27	26	16	3	0	1	1	0	0	0	28	27	16	3	0
10	Pape Meïssa Ba	(Senegal)	FW	13	6	2	2	0	0	0	0	0	0	13	6	2	2	0
11	Pierre-Michel Lasogga^{U23}	(Germany)	FW	1	0	0	0	0	0	0	0	0	0	1	0	0	0	0
15	Emil Højlund	(Denmark)	FW	10	2	0	0	0	0	0	0	0	0	10	2	0	0	0
18	Christopher Antwi-Adjei	(Ghana)	FW	20	10	1	3	0	0	0	0	0	0	20	10	1	3	0
19	Kenan Karaman	(Turkey)	FW	29	29	13	6	1	2	2	1	0	0	31	31	14	6	1
24	Ilyes Hamache	(France)	FW	11	2	0	0	0	0	0	0	0	0	11	2	0	0	0
39	Peter Remmert	(Germany)	FW	2	0	0	0	0	0	0	0	0	0	2	0	0	0	0
47	Zaid Tchibara^{U19}	(Togo)	FW	2	0	0	0	0	0	0	0	0	0	2	0	0	0	0
~~11~~	Bryan Lasme	(France)	FW	6	0	0	1	0	0	0	0	0	0	6	0	0	1	0
~~40~~	Sebastian Polter	(Germany)	FW	1	0	0	0	0	0	0	0	0	0	1	0	0	0	0
Total				34		52	75	5	2		2	5	0	36		54	80	5

Players in white left the club during the season.

=== Goalscorers ===
Rank	Player	Nat	Pos	2. Liga	DFB-Pokal	Total
1	Moussa Sylla	(Mali)	FW	16	0	16
2	Kenan Karaman	(Turkey)	FW	13	1	14
3	Tobias Mohr	(Germany)	MF	3	1	4
4	Janik Bachmann	(Germany)	MF	3	0	3
4	Ron Schallenberg	(Germany)	MF	3	0	3
6	Pape Meïssa Ba	(Senegal)	FW	2	0	2
6	Paul Seguin	(Germany)	MF	2	0	2
6	Amin Younes	(Germany)	FW	2	0	2
9	Christopher Antwi-Adjei	(Ghana)	FW	1	0	1
9	Yassin Ben Balla	(France)	FW	1	0	1
9	Taylan Bulut	(Germany)	DF	1	0	1
9	Ibrahima Cissé	(Mali)	DF	1	0	1
9	Adrian Gantenbein	(Switzerland)	DF	1	0	1
9	Max Grüger	(Germany)	MF	1	0	1
9	Tomáš Kalas	(Czech Republic)	DF	1	0	1
9	Marcin Kamiński	(Poland)	DF	1	0	1
Total				52	2	54

=== Assists ===
Rank	Player	Nat	Pos	2. Liga	DFB-Pokal	Total
1	Tobias Mohr	(Germany)	MF	7	1	8
2	Mehmet-Can Aydın	(Turkey)	DF	6	0	6
3	Paul Seguin	(Germany)	MF	5	0	5
4	Kenan Karaman	(Turkey)	FW	4	0	4
5	Derry Murkin	(England)	DF	3	0	3
5	Amin Younes	(Germany)	FW	3	0	3
7	Christopher Antwi-Adjei	(Ghana)	FW	2	0	2
7	Pape Meïssa Ba	(Senegal)	FW	2	0	2
7	Adrian Gantenbein	(Switzerland)	DF	2	0	2
10	Janik Bachmann	(Germany)	MF	1	0	1
10	Aymen Barkok	(Morocco)	MF	1	0	1
10	Taylan Bulut	(Germany)	DF	1	0	1
10	Anton Donkor	(Germany)	DF	1	0	1
10	Justin Heekeren	(Germany)	GK	1	0	1
10	Emil Højlund	(Denmark)	FW	1	0	1
10	Tomáš Kalas	(Czech Republic)	DF	1	0	1
10	Marcin Kamiński	(Poland)	DF	1	0	1
10	Ron Schallenberg	(Germany)	MF	1	0	1
10	Moussa Sylla	(Mali)	FW	1	0	1
Total				44	1	45

=== Clean sheets ===
Rank	Player	Nat	2. Liga	DFB-Pokal	Total
1	Justin Heekeren	(Germany)	3	0	3
2	Loris Karius	(Germany)	1	0	1
2	Ron-Thorben Hoffmann	(Germany)	0	1	1
Total			4	1	5
