= Jonah Sticker =

German footballer

Personal information
- Full name: Jonah Benedict Sticker
- Date of birth: 8 May 2004 (age 22)
- Place of birth: Cologne, Germany
- Height: 1.80 m (5 ft 11 in)
- Position: Left-back

Team information
- Current team: SC Paderborn
- Number: 3

Youth career
- 2015–2021: Bayer Leverkusen
- 2021–2022: Fortuna Köln
- 2022–2023: Viktoria Köln

Senior career*
Years	Team	Apps	(Gls)
2022	Fortuna Köln U23	10	(1)
2023–2025	Viktoria Köln	57	(1)
2025	SC Paderborn II	1	(0)
2025–	SC Paderborn	27	(0)
- * Club domestic league appearances and goals as of 17:30, 17 October 2026 (UTC)

Jonah Benedict Sticker (born 8 May 2004) is a German professional footballer who plays as a left-back for Bundesliga club SC Paderborn.

== Club career ==
Sticker is a product of the youth academies of the German clubs Bayer Leverkusen and Fortuna Köln, before moving to Viktoria Köln's academy in 2022. On 22 April 2023, he signed his first professional contract with Viktoria Köln and was promoted to their senior team in the 3. Liga. On 26 December 2024, he extended his contract with Viktoria Köln after cementing himself as a consistent starter. On 2 September 2025, he transferred to SC Paderborn in the 2. Bundesliga.

== Career statistics ==
As of match played 28 October 2026

Appearances and goals by club, season and competition
Club	Season	League			DFB-Pokal		Europe		Other		Total	
Club	Season	Division	Apps	Goals	Apps	Goals	Apps	Goals	Apps	Goals	Apps	Goals
Fortuna Köln U23	2022–23	Mittelrheinliga	10	1	—		—		—		10	1
Viktoria Köln	2023–24	3. Liga	17	1	0	0	—		3 (Note: Appearances in Middle Rhine Cup)	0	20	1
Viktoria Köln	2024–25	3. Liga	36	0	1	0	—		5	1	42	1
Viktoria Köln	2025–26	3. Liga	4	0	—		—		0	0	4	0
Viktoria Köln	Total		57	1	1	0	—		8	1	66	2
SC Paderborn II	2025–26	Regionalliga West	1	0	—		—		—		1	0
SC Paderborn	2025–26	2. Bundesliga	22	0	1	0	—		1 (Note: Appearance in 2. Bundesliga promotion play-offs)	0	24	0
SC Paderborn	2026–27	Bundesliga	5	0	2	0	—		—		7	0
SC Paderborn	Total		27	0	3	0	—		1	0	31	0
Career total			95	2	4	0	0	0	9	1	108	4

== Honours ==
Viktoria Köln

- Verbandspokal: 2024–25
