= Dudu (German footballer) =

German footballer (born 1999)

Personal information
- Full name: Eduardo dos Santos Haesler
- Date of birth: 10 February 1999 (age 27)
- Place of birth: Duisburg, Germany
- Height: 1.96 m (6 ft 5 in)
- Position: Goalkeeper

Team information
- Current team: Portimonense (on loan from Estrela da Amadora)

Youth career
- DSV Königswinter
- –2010: FC Hennef 05
- 2010–2012: Borussia Mönchengladbach
- 2012–2013: Rot-Weiss Essen
- 2013–2014: 1. FC Mönchengladbach
- 2014–2018: MSV Duisburg

Senior career*
Years	Team	Apps	(Gls)
2018–2024	Werder Bremen II	43	(0)
2021–2024	Werder Bremen	0	(0)
2021–2022	→ Nordsjælland (loan)	5	(0)
2024–2026	Viktoria Köln	52	(0)
2026–	Estrela da Amadora	0	(0)
- * Club domestic league appearances and goals as of 31 January 2026

Eduardo dos Santos Haesler, commonly known as Dudu (born 10 February 1999), is a German professional footballer who plays as a goalkeeper for Liga Portugal 2 club Portimonense, on loan from Estrela da Amadora.

== Career ==
Haesler started his senior career with German Bundesliga side Werder Bremen. In 2021, he was sent on loan to FC Nordsjælland in Denmark. On 23 August 2021, he debuted for FC Nordsjælland during a 3–1 win over Vejle Boldklub.

On 6 June 2024, Dudu signed with Viktoria Köln in 3. Liga.

On 2 February 2026, Dudu joined Estrela da Amadora in Portugal on a two-and-a-half-year contract.

== Personal life ==
Born in Germany, Dudu is of Brazilian descent through his mother.

== Career statistics ==
As of match played 6 December 2025

Appearances and goals by club, season and competition
Club	Season	League			National cup (Note: Includes Danish Cup, DFB-Pokal)		Europe		Other		Total	
Club	Season	Division	Apps	Goals	Apps	Goals	Apps	Goals	Apps	Goals	Apps	Goals
Werder Bremen II	2018–19	Regionalliga Nord	20	0	—		—		—		20	0
Werder Bremen II	2019–20	Regionalliga Nord	1	0	—		—		—		1	0
Werder Bremen II	2020–21	Regionalliga Nord	7	0	—		—		—		7	0
Werder Bremen II	2023–24	Bremen-Liga	15	0	—		—		—		15	0
Werder Bremen II	Total		43	0	—		—		—		43	0
Werder Bremen	2022–23	Bundesliga	0	0	0	0	—		—		0	0
Werder Bremen	2023–24	Bundesliga	0	0	0	0	—		—		0	0
Werder Bremen	Total		0	0	0	0	—		—		0	0
Nordsjælland (loan)	2021–22	Danish Superliga	5	0	1	0	—		—		6	0
Viktoria Köln	2024–25	3. Liga	36	0	0	0	—		—		36	0
Viktoria Köln	2025–26	3. Liga	16	0	1	0	—		—		17	0
Viktoria Köln	Total		54	0	1	0	—		—		55	0
Estrela da Amadora	2025–26	Primeira Liga	0	0	—		—		—		0	0
Career total			102	0	2	0	0	0	0	0	104	0
