= Taylan Bulut =

German footballer (born 2006)

Personal information
- Date of birth: 19 January 2006 (age 20)
- Place of birth: Eschweiler, Germany
- Height: 1.88 m (6 ft 2 in)
- Position: Right-back

Team information
- Current team: Beşiktaş
- Number: 22

Youth career
- 2010–2013: Germania Dürwiß
- 2013–2020: Bayer Leverkusen
- 2020–2024: Schalke 04

Senior career*
Years	Team	Apps	(Gls)
2024	Schalke 04 II	4	(0)
2024–2025	Schalke 04	27	(1)
2025–	Beşiktaş	12	(0)

International career^{‡}
2021–2022	Germany U16	5	(0)
2022–2023	Germany U17	15	(0)
2024	Germany U18	4	(0)
2024–2025	Germany U19	9	(0)
2025–	Germany U20	11	(1)
Medal record
Men's football
Representing Germany
UEFA European Under-17 Championship
Winner	2023 Hungary
- * Club domestic league appearances and goals as of 8 November 2026 ‡ National team caps and goals as of 16 November 2026

Taylan Bulut (born 19 January 2006) is a German professional footballer who plays as a right-back for Süper Lig club Beşiktaş.

== Club career ==
Bulut made his first team debut for Schalke 04 in the 2. Bundesliga in a 2–0 defeat against Greuther Fürth on 19 May 2024, coming on as a substitute in the 90th minute. On 17 February 2025, he extended his contract with Schalke until 2029.

On 16 August 2025, Bulut signed a five-year contract with Beşiktaş.

== International career ==
Bulut was born in Germany to a Turkish father and Montenegrin mother. He has represented Germany at under-16, under-17, under-18 and under-19 level. At the 2023 UEFA European Under-17 Championship, he scored the third penalty as Germany beat France 5–4 in a penalty shoot-out victory in the final.

== Career statistics ==
As of match played 20 August 2026

Appearances and goals by club, season and competition
Club	Season	League			Cup		Europe		Total	
Club	Season	Division	Apps	Goals	Apps	Goals	Apps	Goals	Apps	Goals
Schalke 04 II	2023–24	Regionalliga West	1	0	—		—		1	0
Schalke 04 II	2024–25	Regionalliga West	3	0	—		—		3	0
Schalke 04 II	Total		4	0	—		—		4	0
Schalke 04	2023–24	2. Bundesliga	1	0	—		—		1	0
Schalke 04	2024–25	2. Bundesliga	24	1	2	0	—		26	1
Schalke 04	2025–26	2. Bundesliga	2	0	—		—		2	0
Schalke 04	Total		27	1	2	0	—		29	1
Beşiktaş	2025–26	Süper Lig	7	0	2	0	2 (Note: Appearances in UEFA Conference League)	0	11	0
Beşiktaş	2026–27	Süper Lig	1	0	0	0	1 (Note: Appearance in UEFA Europa League)	0	2	0
Beşiktaş	Total		8	0	2	0	3	0	13	0
Career total			39	1	4	0	3	0	46	1

== Honours ==
Germany U17

- UEFA European Under-17 Championship: 2023
