= 2018–19 Beşiktaş J.K. season =

Beşiktaş
2018–19 season
- President: Fikret Orman
- Head coach: Şenol Güneş
- Stadium: Vodafone Park
- Süper Lig: 3rd
- Turkish Cup: Banned
- UEFA Europa League: Group stage
- Top goalscorer: League: Burak Yılmaz (11 goals); All: Burak Yılmaz (11 goals)
Home colours	Away colours	Third colours

The 2018–19 Beşiktaş J.K. season was the club's 115th year since its foundation, 97th season of competitive football and the club's 60th season contesting the Süper Lig, the top division of Turkish football. The 2018–19 season lasted from 1 July 2018 to 30 June 2019.

On 19 April 2018, Beşiktaş' Turkish Cup match against Fenerbahçe was abandoned after manager Beşiktaş Şenol Güneş was struck on the head with an object. As a result, the Turkish Football Federation ordered the remaining 32 minutes to be played behind closed doors. However, Beşiktaş refused to travel to the match after an appeal failed. As a result, Beşiktaş was banned from competing in the 2018–19 Turkish Cup.

== Squad ==
As of match played 24 May 2019

No.	Name	Nationality	Position	Date of birth (age)	Signed from	Signed In	Apps.	Goals
Goalkeepers
1	Loris Karius	(Germany)	GK	22 June 1993 (aged 25)	loan from Liverpool	2018	35	0
29	Tolga Zengin (captain)	(Turkey)	GK	10 October 1983 (aged 35)	Trabzonspor	2013	128	0
30	Ersin Destanoğlu	(Turkey)	GK	1 January 2001 (aged 18)	Academy	2018	0	0
97	Utku Yuvakuran	(Turkey)	GK	2 November 1997 (aged 21)	Beylerbeyi	2016	5	0
Defenders
3	Adriano	(Brazil)	DF	26 October 1984 (aged 34)	Barcelona	2016	109	4
6	Gary Medel	(Chile)	DF	3 August 1987 (aged 31)	Internazionale	2017	72	1
12	Enzo Roco	(Chile)	DF	16 August 1992 (aged 26)	Cruz Azul	2018	10	1
15	Nicolas Isimat-Mirin	(France)	DF	15 November 1991 (aged 27)	PSV	2019	14	0
24	Domagoj Vida	(Croatia)	DF	29 April 1989 (aged 30)	Dynamo Kyiv	2018	54	4
41	Alpay Çelebi	(Turkey)	DF	4 April 1999 (aged 20)	Academy	2017	2	0
61	Rıdvan Yılmaz	(Turkey)	DF	21 May 2001 (aged 18)	Academy	2019	1	0
77	Gökhan Gönül	(Turkey)	DF	4 January 1985 (aged 34)	Fenerbahçe	2016	108	5
88	Caner Erkin	(Turkey)	DF	4 October 1988 (aged 30)	Internazionale	2017	83	2
Midfielders
7	Ricardo Quaresma	(Portugal)	MF	26 September 1983 (aged 35)	Porto	2015	223	38
10	Oğuzhan Özyakup	(Turkey)	MF	23 September 1992 (aged 26)	Arsenal	2012	244	30
13	Atiba Hutchinson	(Canada)	MF	8 February 1983 (aged 36)	PSV	2013	217	13
17	Jeremain Lens	(Netherlands)	MF	24 November 1987 (aged 31)	Sunderland	2018	67	9
20	Necip Uysal	(Turkey)	MF	24 January 1991 (aged 28)	Academy	2009	303	5
21	Muhayer Oktay	(Turkey)	MF	28 April 1999 (aged 20)	Fortuna Düsseldorf II	2019	0	0
23	Shinji Kagawa	(Japan)	MF	17 March 1989 (aged 30)	loan from Borussia Dortmund	2019	14	4
26	Dorukhan Toköz	(Turkey)	MF	21 May 1996 (aged 23)	Eskişehirspor	2018	25	3
44	Erdem Seçgin	(Turkey)	MF	5 January 2000 (aged 19)	Academy	2018	1	0
55	Gökhan Töre	(Turkey)	MF	20 January 1992 (aged 27)	Rubin Kazan	2014	120	19
	Oğuzhan Aydoğan	(Germany)	MF	4 February 1997 (aged 22)	Borussia Dortmund	2016	1	0
Strikers
11	Mustafa Pektemek	(Turkey)	FW	11 August 1988 (aged 30)	Gençlerbirliği	2011	150	30
19	Güven Yalçın	(Turkey)	FW	18 January 1999 (aged 20)	Bayer Leverkusen	2018	23	8
22	Adem Ljajić	(Serbia)	FW	29 September 1991 (aged 27)	loan from Torino	2018	32	9
71	Burak Yılmaz	(Turkey)	FW	15 July 1985 (aged 33)	Trabzonspor	2019	70	18
95	Cyle Larin	(Canada)	FW	17 April 1995 (aged 24)	Orlando City	2018	26	8
Out on loan
14	Fatih Aksoy	(Turkey)	DF	6 November 1997 (aged 21)	Academy	2016	18	0
15	Orkan Çınar	(Turkey)	MF	29 January 1996 (aged 23)	Gaziantepspor	2017	5	1
28	Umut Nayir	(Turkey)	FW	28 June 1993 (aged 25)	Osmanlıspor	2018	0	0
	Aras Özbiliz	(Armenia)	MF	9 March 1990 (aged 29)	Spartak Moscow	2016	5	1
Players who left during the season
5	Pepe	(Portugal)	DF	26 February 1983 (aged 36)	Real Madrid	2017	50	7
8	Ryan Babel	(Netherlands)	MF	19 December 1986 (aged 32)	Deportivo La Coruña	2017	86	29
9	Álvaro Negredo	(Spain)	FW	20 August 1985 (aged 33)	Valencia	2017	46	17
18	Tolgay Arslan	(Germany)	MF	16 August 1990 (aged 28)	Hamburger SV	2015	130	3
99	Vágner Love	(Brazil)	FW	11 June 1984 (aged 34)	Alanyaspor	2018	29	11

=== Out on loan ===
Note: Flags indicate national team as defined under FIFA eligibility rules; some limited exceptions apply. Players may hold more than one non-FIFA nationality.

No.	Pos.	Nation	Player
22	MF	ARM	Aras Özbiliz (on loan at Willem II until 30 June 2019)
—	DF	TUR	Fatih Aksoy (on loan at Sivasspor until 30 June 2020)
—	MF	TUR	Sedat Şahintürk (on loan at Balıkesirspor until 30 June 2019)

No.	Pos.	Nation	Player
—	MF	TUR	Orkan Çınar (on loan at Adana Demirspor until 30 June 2019)
—	FW	TUR	Umut Nayir (on loan at Bursaspor until 30 June 2019)

== Transfers ==
=== In ===
Date	Position	Nationality	Name	From	Fee	Ref.
1 June 2018	MF	(Netherlands)	Jeremain Lens	Sunderland	Undisclosed	
27 June 2018	MF	(Turkey)	Dorukhan Toköz	Eskişehirspor	Undisclosed	
27 June 2018	FW	(Turkey)	Güven Yalçın	Bayer Leverkusen	Undisclosed	
27 July 2018	DF	(Chile)	Enzo Roco	Cruz Azul	Undisclosed	
27 July 2018	FW	(Turkey)	Umut Nayir	Osmanlıspor	Undisclosed	
Winter 2019	MF	(Turkey)	Muhayer Oktay	Fortuna Düsseldorf II	Undisclosed	
4 January 2019	FW	(Turkey)	Burak Yılmaz	Trabzonspor	Undisclosed	
6 January 2019	DF	(France)	Nicolas Isimat-Mirin	PSV	Undisclosed	

=== Out ===
Date	Position	Nationality	Name	To	Fee	Ref.
18 May 2018	DF	(Serbia)	Duško Tošić	Guangzhou R&F	Undisclosed	
20 July 2018	DF	(Croatia)	Matej Mitrović	Club Brugge	Undisclosed	
24 July 2018	GK	(Spain)	Fabri	Fulham	Undisclosed	
18 September 2018	FW	(Spain)	Álvaro Negredo	Al-Nasr	Undisclosed	
	GK	(Ukraine)	Denys Boyko	Dynamo Kyiv		
	DF	(Colombia)	Pedro Franco	América de Cali		
15 January 2019	FW	(Netherlands)	Ryan Babel	Fulham	Undisclosed	
31 January 2019	MF	(Germany)	Tolgay Arslan	Fenerbahçe	Undisclosed	

=== Loans in ===
Date from	Position	Nationality	Name	From	Date to	Ref.
25 August 2018	GK	(Germany)	Loris Karius	Liverpool	End of 2019–20 season	
31 August 2018	FW	(Serbia)	Adem Ljajić	Torino	30 June 2019	
31 January 2019	MF	(Japan)	Shinji Kagawa	Borussia Dortmund	End of season	

=== Loans out ===
Date from	Position	Nationality	Name	To	Date to	Ref.
	MF	(Turkey)	Orkan Çınar	Adana Demirspor	30 June 2019	
	MF	(Turkey)	Umut Nayir	Bursaspor	30 June 2019	
	DF	(Turkey)	Fatih Aksoy	Sivasspor	30 June 2019	

=== Released ===
Date	Position	Nationality	Name	Joined	Date
	MF	(Austria)	Veli Kavlak		
17 December 2018	DF	(Portugal)	Pepe	Porto	8 January 2019
25 January 2019	FW	(Brazil)	Vágner Love	Corinthians	25 January 2019

== Competitions ==
=== Overview ===
Competition	First match	Last match	Starting round	Final position	Record							
Competition	First match	Last match	Starting round	Final position	Pld	W	D	L	GF	GA	GD	Win %
Süper Lig	12 August 2018	24 May 2019	Matchday 1	3rd	34	19	8	7	72	46	+26	55.88
Europa League	26 July 2018	13 December 2018	Second qualifying round	Group stage	12	6	2	4	23	14	+9	50.00
Total					46	25	10	11	95	60	+35	54.35

Last updated: 24 May 2019.
Source: Competitions

=== Süper Lig ===
==== League table ====
Pos	Team	Pld	W	D	L	GF	GA	GD	Pts	Qualification or relegation
1	Galatasaray (C)	34	20	9	5	72	36	+36	69	Qualification for the Champions League group stage
2	Başakşehir	34	19	10	5	49	22	+27	67	Qualification for the Champions League third qualifying round
3	Beşiktaş	34	19	8	7	72	46	+26	65	Qualification for the Europa League group stage
4	Trabzonspor	34	18	9	7	64	46	+18	63	Qualification for the Europa League third qualifying round
5	Yeni Malatyaspor	34	13	8	13	47	46	+1	47	Qualification for the Europa League second qualifying round

Source: Süper Lig, Soccerway
Rules for classification: 1) Points; 2) Head-to-head points; 3) Head-to-head goal difference; 4) Head-to-head goals scored; 5) Goal difference; 6) Goals scored; 7) Play-off.
(C) Champions

==== Results summary ====
Overall								Home						Away					
Pld	W	D	L	GF	GA	GD	Pts	W	D	L	GF	GA	GD	W	D	L	GF	GA	GD
34	19	8	7	71	46	+25	65	12	3	2	36	21	+15	7	5	5	35	25	+10

Last updated: 24 May 2019.
Source: See Results

==== Results by matchday ====
Round	1	2	3	4	5	6	7	8	9	10	11	12	13	14	15	16	17	18	19	20	21	22	23	24	25	26	27	28	29	30	31	32	33	34
Ground	H	A	H	A	H	A	H	A	A	H	A	H	A	H	A	H	A	A	H	A	H	A	H	A	H	H	A	H	A	H	A	H	A	H
Result	W	W	L	D	W	D	W	D	L	W	L	L	W	W	D	D	L	W	D	W	W	W	D	D	W	W	W	W	W	W	L	W	L	W
Position	7	1	5	7	4	4	3	3	5	4	6	7	4	3	4	3	7	6	6	3	3	3	3	3	3	3	3	3	3	3	3	3	3	3

Updated to match(es) played on 24 May 2019. Source: Positions by round
A = Away; H = Home; W = Win; D = Draw; L = Loss

==== Results ====
12 August 2018 1	Beşiktaş	2–1	Akhisar Belediyespor	Istanbul
21:45 TRT (UTC+3)	Pepe 39'; Babel 42'; Medel (yellow card) 59'; Uysal (yellow card) 73'; Erkin (yellow card) 90+5'	Report	Bayram (yellow card) 14'; Öztürk (yellow card) 28'; Osmanpaşa (yellow card) 45+2'; Lopes (yellow card) 51'; Seleznyov 56'; Vršajević (yellow card) 70'; Yumlu (yellow card) 90+5'	Stadium: Vodafone Park; Referee: Bülent Yıldırım

19 August 2018 2	BB Erzurumspor	1–3	Beşiktaş	Erzurum
19:15 TRT (UTC+3)	Šćuk 16'	Report	Gönül 53'; Adriano (yellow card) 68'; Lens (yellow card) 74'; Negredo 76'; Yalçın (yellow card) 79'; Quaresma 86' (pen.)	Stadium: Delicio Tiramisu Stadium; Referee: Umit Öztürk

26 August 2018 3	Beşiktaş	2–3	Antalyaspor	Istanbul
21:45 TRT (UTC+3)	Negredo 26'; Pepe 56'; Quaresma (yellow card) 66'; Erkin (yellow card) 74'	Report	Öztürk (yellow card) 9'; Doukara 20', 25', (yellow card) 62'; Čelůstka (yellow card) 30'; Kurtuluş 33'; Sangaré (yellow card) 71'; Danilo (yellow card) 78'; Boffin (yellow card) 82'; Dursun (yellow card) 85'	Stadium: Vodafone Park; Referee: Halis Özkahya

2 September 2018 4	Bursaspor	1–1	Beşiktaş	Bursa
21:45 TRT (UTC+3)	Sakho 86'; Torun (yellow card) 90+1'	Report	Medel (yellow card) 41'; Babel 51'; Karius (yellow card) 80'	Stadium: Timsah Arena; Referee: Cüneyt Çakır

15 September 2018 5	Beşiktaş	2–1	Yeni Malatyaspor	Istanbul
20:00 TRT (UTC+3)	Pepe 52'; Medel (yellow card) 57' (yellow-red card) 74'; Babel 81'; Erkin (yellow card) 83'	Report	Mina (yellow card) 20'; Chebake (yellow card) 37'; Büyük (yellow card) 61'; Guilherme 89'	Stadium: Vodafone Park; Referee: Halil Umut Meler

24 September 2018 6	Fenerbahçe	1–1	Beşiktaş	Istanbul
21:00 TRT (UTC+3)	Reyes (yellow card) 59'; Ayew 71'	Report	Babel 40'; Arslan (yellow card) 63'; Özyakup (yellow card) 64'; Quaresma (yellow card) 84'; Erkin (yellow card) 87' (yellow-red card) 90+4'	Stadium: Şükrü Saracoğlu Stadium; Referee: Fırat Aydınus

29 September 2018 7	Beşiktaş	2–0	Kayserispor	Istanbul
19:00 TRT (UTC+3)	Vágner Love 34'; Quaresma 71'; Lens (yellow card) 87'	Report		Stadium: Vodafone Park; Referee: Yaşar Kemal Uğurlu

7 October 2018 8	Konyaspor	2–2	Beşiktaş	Konya
20:30 TRT (UTC+3)	Yatabaré 31' (pen.), (penalty missed) 52'; Fındıklı (yellow card) 33'; Diagne (yellow card) 34'; Şahiner (yellow card) 54'; Öztorun (yellow card) 63'; Skubic (yellow card) 66'; Hurtado (yellow card) 71', (goal) 90+4'	Report	Vida (yellow card) 2' (red card) 28'; Quaresma (yellow card) 37'; Medel (yellow card) 49'; Ljajić (yellow card) 50'; Vágner Love 79'; Lens 80', (yellow card) 83'; Pepe (yellow card) 90'; Babel (yellow card) 90+7'	Stadium: Konya Büyükşehir Stadium; Referee: Ümit Öztürk

21 October 2018 9	Göztepe	2–0	Beşiktaş	İzmir
19:00 TRT (UTC+3)	Wallace (yellow card) 20', (goal) 60'; Jerome 51'; Bingöl (yellow card) 90+2'; Gassama (yellow card) 90+6'	Report	Özyakup (penalty missed) 19'; Lens (yellow card) 40'; Gönül (yellow card) 72'	Stadium: Doğanlar Stadium; Referee: Fırat Aydınus

29 October 2018 10	Beşiktaş	4–1	Çaykur Rizespor	Istanbul
21:00 TRT (UTC+3)	Pektemek 3', 40'; Quaresma (yellow card) 31', (penalty missed) 60'; Vida (yellow card) 48'; Adriano (yellow card) 58'; Fink 72' (o.g.); Vágner Love 79'	Report	Ovacıklı (red card) 10'; Roco 49' (o.g.); Saâdane (yellow card) 60' (yellow-red card) 61'	Stadium: Vodafone Park; Referee: Bülent Yıldırım

3 November 2018 11	İstanbul Başakşehir	1–0	Beşiktaş	Istanbul
20:00 TRT (UTC+3)	Epureanu 18'; Aydoğdu (yellow card) 76'; Günok (yellow card) 90+1'	Report	Lens (yellow card) 45'; Medel (yellow card) 75'	Stadium: Başakşehir Fatih Terim Stadium; Referee: Halis Özkahya

11 November 2018 12	Beşiktaş	1–2	Sivasspor	Istanbul
20:30 TRT (UTC+3)	Yalçın 11'; Quaresma (yellow card) 67'; Toköz (yellow card) 68'; Vida (yellow card) 72'; Roco (yellow card) 88'	Report	David Braz 14', (yellow card) 33'; Kılınç 53'; Arslan (yellow card) 68'; Papp (yellow card) 79'	Stadium: Vodafone Park; Referee: Yaşar Kemal Uğurlu

24 November 2018 13	Ankaragücü	1–4	Beşiktaş	Kayseri
19:00 TRT (UTC+3)	Faty (yellow card) 57'; Kubalas (yellow card) 79'; El Kabir 86'	Report	Ljajić 23'; Pektemek 27'; Yalçın 44'; Uysal (yellow card) 52'; Özyakup 88'; Larin (yellow card) 90+1'	Stadium: Kadir Has Stadium; Referee: Mete Kalkavan

2 December 2018 14	Beşiktaş	1–0	Galatasaray	Istanbul
20:00 TRT (UTC+3)	Ljajić 18' (pen.), (yellow card) 86'; Medel (yellow card) 40'; Adriano (yellow card) 51'; Karius (yellow card) 90+2'	Report	Derdiyok (yellow card) 17'; Fernando (yellow card) 41'; İnan (yellow card) 42'; Mariano (yellow card) 45+2'	Stadium: Vodafone Park; Referee: Cüneyt Çakır

7 December 2018 15	Alanyaspor	0–0	Beşiktaş	Alanya
19:00 TRT (UTC+3)	Djalma (yellow card) 9'; Sackey (yellow card) 49'; Villafáñez (yellow card) 90+4'	Report	Yalçın (yellow card) 3'; Pektemek (yellow card) 34'	Stadium: Bahçeşehir Okulları Stadium; Referee: Alper Ulusoy

16 December 2018 16	Beşiktaş	2–2	Trabzonspor	Istanbul
19:00 TRT (UTC+3)	Toköz (yellow card) 45'; Onazi 57' (o.g.); Ljajić (yellow card) 77'; Erkin (yellow card) 78'; Pektemek 90+6'	Report	Rodallega 45+1'; Nwakaeme 47'; Pereira (yellow card) 90+2'	Stadium: Vodafone Park; Referee: Halil Umut Meler

22 December 2018 17	Kasımpaşa	4–1	Beşiktaş	Istanbul
19:00 TRT (UTC+3)	Sadiku 11'; Diagne (yellow card) 20', (goal) 45+1', 75' (pen.); Pavelka (yellow card) 21', (goal) 83'; Eduok (yellow card) 81'	Report	Adriano (yellow card) 42'; Vida (yellow card) 45+2'; Pektemek 52'; Aksoy (yellow card) 74'	Stadium: Recep Tayyip Erdoğan Stadium; Referee: Cüneyt Çakır

20 January 2019 18	Akhisar Belediyespor	0–3	Beşiktaş	Akhisar
19:30 TRT (UTC+3)	Manu (yellow card) 24'; Lopes (yellow card) 66'; Barbosa (yellow card) 88'	Report	Toköz 23'; Medel (yellow card) 28'; Quaresma (yellow card) 36'; Gönül 48'; Erkin (yellow card) 50'; Larin 76'; Vida (yellow card) 86'	Stadium: Spor Toto Akhisar Stadium; Referee: Umit Öztürk

25 January 2019 19	Beşiktaş	1–1	BB Erzurumspor	Istanbul
19:30 TRT (UTC+3)	Uysal (yellow card) 34'; Yılmaz (yellow card) 38'; Toköz (yellow card) 63', (goal) 78'; Medel (yellow card) 73'; Quaresma (red card) 87'	Report	Toköz 69' (o.g.); Gör (yellow card) 72'; Ünlü (yellow card) 83'; Šehić (yellow card) 85'; Opseth (yellow card) 90'	Stadium: Vodafone Park; Referee: Mustafa Öğretmenoğlu

3 February 2019 20	Antalyaspor	2–6	Beşiktaş	Antalya
18:00 TRT (UTC+3)	Doukara 50', (yellow card) 90+1'; Amilton (yellow card) 83'; Chico 90'; Sinik (yellow card) 90+2'	Report	Vida (yellow card) 14'; Ljajić 35' (pen.); Toköz 39'; Hutchinson 43'; Dursun 67' (o.g.); Lens (yellow card) 72'; Kagawa 82', 84'	Stadium: Antalya Arena; Referee: Bülent Yıldırım

9 February 2019 21	Beşiktaş	2–0	Bursaspor	Istanbul
19:00 TRT (UTC+3)	Yılmaz 40', 62'; Erkin (yellow card) 87'	Report	Kara (yellow card) 55'	Stadium: Vodafone Park; Referee: Mete Kalkavan

15 February 2019 22	Yeni Malatyaspor	1–2	Beşiktaş	Malatya
20:30 TRT (UTC+3)	Akça (yellow card) 37'; Büyük (red card) 39'; Şişmanoğlu 65'	Report	Hutchinson 50'; Ljajić 70', (yellow card) 71'	Stadium: Malatya Arena; Referee: Cüneyt Çakır

25 February 2019 23	Beşiktaş	3–3	Fenerbahçe	Istanbul
21:00 TRT (UTC+3)	Gönül 10'; Yılmaz 18' (pen.), 45+2', (yellow card) 74'; Uysal (yellow card) 60'	Report	Zajc (yellow card) 35', (goal) 55'; Dirar (yellow card) 60'; Çiftpınar 61', (yellow card) 76'; Kaldırım 67', (yellow card) 90+8'	Stadium: Vodafone Park; Referee: Bülent Yıldırım

2 March 2019 24	Kayserispor	2–2	Beşiktaş	Kayseri
16:00 TRT (UTC+3)	Kucher (yellow card) 41'; Çinaz (yellow card) 55'; Kravets 57'; Türüç 62', (yellow card) 78'	Report	Toköz (yellow card) 15'; Hutchinson 37'; Erkin 90'; Quaresma (yellow card) 90+3'; Özyakup (yellow card) 90+4'	Stadium: Kadir Has Stadium; Referee: Suat Arslanboğa

10 March 2019 25	Beşiktaş	3–2	Konyaspor	Istanbul
19:00 TRT (UTC+3)	Ljajić (yellow card) 11', (goal) 14'; Uysal (yellow card) 23'; Yılmaz 33'; Kagawa 90+3'	Report	Şahiner 19'; Akçay (yellow card) 27'; Filipović (yellow card) 33'; Fofana 75', (yellow card) 88'	Stadium: Vodafone Park; Referee: Ali Palabıyık

16 March 2019 26	Beşiktaş	1–0	Göztepe	Istanbul
19:00 TRT (UTC+3)	Yılmaz 46'	Report	Öztekin (yellow card) 79'; Öztürk (yellow card) 90+5'	Stadium: Vodafone Park; Referee: Serkan Çınar

8 April 2019 27	Çaykur Rizespor	2–7	Beşiktaş	Rize
20:00 TRT (UTC+3)	Abarhoun (yellow card) 26', (goal) 70'; Muriqi 42'	Report	Vida 8'; Ljajić 14', 78'; Erkin (yellow card) 58'; Yılmaz 64', (yellow card) 66'; Yalçın 71', 82', 89'	Stadium: Yeni Rize Şehir Stadium; Referee: Arda Kardeşler

13 April 2019 28	Beşiktaş	2–1	İstanbul Başakşehir	Istanbul
19:00 TRT (UTC+3)	Erkin (yellow card) 19'; Hutchinson 42'; Yılmaz (yellow card) 45+3', (goal) 52'	Report	Robinho 35'; Elia (yellow card) 38'; Belözoğlu (yellow card) 76'	Stadium: Vodafone Park; Referee: Cüneyt Çakır

22 April 2019 29	Sivasspor	1–2	Beşiktaş	Sivas
20:00 TRT (UTC+3)	Papp (yellow card) 40'; Diabaté 45'	Report	Vida 31', (yellow card) 33'; Medel (yellow card) 40'; Yılmaz 87'; Gönül (yellow card) 90+5'	Stadium: New Sivas 4 Eylül Stadium; Referee: Mete Kalkavan

28 April 2019 30	Beşiktaş	4–1	Ankaragücü	Istanbul
19:00 TRT (UTC+3)	Yılmaz 8', 63' (pen.); Isimat-Mirin (yellow card) 52'; Vida 54'; Erkin (yellow card) 70'; Ljajić 81'	Report	Kitsiou (yellow card) 66'; Sacko (yellow card) 68', (goal) 79' (pen.); Pinto (yellow card) 79'	Stadium: Vodafone Park; Referee: Halil Umut Meler

5 May 2019 31	Galatasaray	2–0	Beşiktaş	Istanbul
19:00 TRT (UTC+3)	Belhanda (yellow card) 42'; Onyekuru 44', (yellow card) 82'; Fernando 54'	Report	Lens (yellow card) 19'; Erkin (yellow card) 37'; Vida (yellow card) 38'; Gönül (yellow card) 45+1'; Ljajić (yellow card) 45+2'; Kagawa (yellow card) 90+3'	Stadium: Türk Telekom Stadium; Referee: Bülent Yıldırım

13 May 2019 32	Beşiktaş	2–1	Alanyaspor	Istanbul
20:00 TRT (UTC+3)	Ljajić 11'; Toköz (yellow card) 50'; Quaresma 54'; Uysal (yellow card) 90'	Report	Erkin 44' (o.g.); N'Sakala (yellow card) 90+1'	Stadium: Vodafone Park; Referee: Cüneyt Çakır

18 May 2019 33	Trabzonspor	2–1	Beşiktaş	Trabzon
19:00 TRT (UTC+3)	Novák 53'; Yazıcı 77', (yellow card) 90+4'; Sosa (yellow card) 90+1'; Amiri (yellow card) 90+1'	Report	Erkin (yellow card) 15'; Isimat-Mirin (yellow card) 72'; Kagawa 74'	Stadium: Medical Park Stadyumu; Referee: Fırat Aydınus

24 May 2019 34	Beşiktaş	3–2	Kasımpaşa	Istanbul
21:00 TRT (UTC+3)	Yalçın 10', 44', 45+1'; Ljajić (yellow card) 80'; Lens (yellow card) 90+1' (yellow-red card) 90+4'	Report	Hajradinović 13'; Koita 67'	Stadium: Vodafone Park; Referee: Mete Kalkavan

=== UEFA Europa League ===
==== Qualifying rounds ====
===== Second qualifying round =====
26 July 2018 First leg	B36 Tórshavn (Faroe Islands)	0–2	(Turkey) Beşiktaş	Tórshavn, Faroe Islands
21:00 TRT (UTC+3)	M. Jacobsen (yellow card) 70'	Report	Lens 8'; Gönül 26'; Pektemek (yellow card) 85'	Stadium: Gundadalur; Attendance: 1,634; Referee: Ievgenii Aranovskyi (Ukraine)

2 August 2018 Second leg	Beşiktaş (Turkey)	6–0 (8–0 agg.)	(Faroe Islands) B36 Tórshavn	Istanbul, Turkey
21:00 TRT (UTC+3)	Larin 31', 61', 79'; Erkin 43'; Özyakup 74'; Vágner Love 90+3' (pen.)	Report	Petersen (yellow card) 90+3'	Stadium: Vodafone Park; Referee: Carlos Xistra (Portugal)

===== Third qualifying round =====
9 August 2018 First leg	Beşiktaş (Turkey)	1–0	(Austria) LASK Linz	Istanbul, Turkey
21:00 TRT (UTC+3)	Babel 6'	Report	Ramsebner (yellow card) 62'; Ranftl (yellow card) 74'; Trauner (yellow card) 76'	Stadium: Vodafone Park; Attendance: 24,476; Referee: Bartosz Frankowski (Poland)

16 August 2018 Second leg	LASK Linz (Austria)	2–1 (2–2 (a) agg.)	(Turkey) Beşiktaş	Pasching, Austria
20:45 TRT (UTC+3)	João Victor 42'; Ranftl (yellow card) 64'; Frieser 68', (yellow card) 69'; Goiginger (yellow card) 82'	Report	Medel (yellow card) 44'; Negredo (yellow card) 85' (yellow-red card) 90+2', (goal) 90'	Stadium: Waldstadion; Referee: Nikola Dabanović (Montenegro)

===== Play-off round =====
23 August 2018 First leg	Partizan (Serbia)	1–1	(Turkey) Beşiktaş	Belgrade, Serbia
21:30 TRT (UTC+3)	Gomes 14'; Kosović (yellow card) 38'; Ivanović (yellow card) 42'; N. G. Miletić (yellow card) 43'; Nikolić (yellow card) 80'	Report	Arslan 15', (yellow card) 64'; Erkin (yellow card) 59'; Larin (yellow card) 90+2'	Stadium: Partizan Stadium; Attendance: 16,240; Referee: Ivan Kružliak (Slovakia)

30 August 2018 Second leg	Beşiktaş (Turkey)	3–0 (4–1 agg.)	(Serbia) Partizan	Istanbul, Turkey
21:00 TRT (UTC+3)	Pepe 37', 69'; Özyakup 45'	Report	N. G. Miletić (yellow card) 42'; Gomes (yellow card) 63'; Nikolić (yellow card) 80'	Stadium: Vodafone Park; Referee: Ovidiu Hațegan (Romania)

==== Group stage ====
Pos	Team	Pld	W	D	L	GF	GA	GD	Pts	Qualification
1	(Belgium) Genk	6	3	2	1	14	8	+6	11	Advance to knockout phase
2	(Sweden) Malmö FF	6	2	3	1	7	6	+1	9	Advance to knockout phase
3	(Turkey) Beşiktaş	6	2	1	3	9	11	−2	7	
4	(Norway) Sarpsborg 08	6	1	2	3	8	13	−5	5	

Source: UEFA
Rules for classification: Group stage tiebreakers

20 September 2018 1	Beşiktaş (Turkey)	3–1	(Norway) Sarpsborg 08	Istanbul, Turkey
19:55 TRT (UTC+3)	Medel (yellow card) 20'; Babel 51'; Roco 69', (yellow card) 90+3'; Lens 82'	Report	Askar (yellow card) 37'; Zachariassen 90+4'	Stadium: Vodafone Park; Attendance: 24,955; Referee: Tamás Bognár (Hungary)

4 October 2018 2	Malmö FF (Sweden)	2–0	(Turkey) Beşiktaş	Malmö, Sweden
22:00 TRT (UTC+3)	Bachirou (yellow card) 45'; Erkin 53' (o.g.); Bengtsson (yellow card) 70'; Rosenberg 76' (pen.)	Report	Pepe (yellow card) 58'; Medel (yellow card) 66'; Erkin (yellow card) 76'	Stadium: Stadion; Attendance: 17,174; Referee: Aleksandar Stavrev (Macedonia)

25 October 2018 3	Beşiktaş (Turkey)	2–4	(Belgium) Genk	Istanbul, Turkey
22:00 TRT (UTC+3)	Lens (yellow card) 45+2'; Roco (yellow card) 47'; Gönül (yellow card) 56'; Vágner Love 74', 86'; Pektemek (yellow card) 89'; Özyakup (yellow card) 90+3'	Report	Samatta 23', 70'; Lucumí (yellow card) 45+2'; Dewaest (yellow card) 45+4'; Uronen (yellow card) 61'; Ndongala 81'; Piotrowski 83'	Stadium: Vodafone Park; Attendance: 25,209; Referee: Daniel Stefański (Poland)

8 November 2018 4	Genk (Belgium)	1–1	(Turkey) Beşiktaş	Genk, Belgium
19:55 TRT (UTC+3)	Samatta (yellow card) 35'; Berge 87'	Report	Uysal (yellow card) 15'; Quaresma 16'; Pepe (yellow card) 80'	Stadium: Luminus Arena; Attendance: 14,292; Referee: Tobias Stieler (Germany)

29 November 2018 5	Sarpsborg 08 (Norway)	2–3	(Turkey) Beşiktaş	Sarpsborg, Norway
23:00 TRT (UTC+3)	Muhammed 1'; Heintz 6'	Report	Ljajić (yellow card) 55'; Lens 62', 90'; Vágner Love 66'; Aksoy (yellow card) 79'; Özyakup (yellow card) 80'	Stadium: Sarpsborg Stadion; Attendance: 8,022; Referee: Harald Lechner (Austria)

13 December 2018 6	Beşiktaş (Turkey)	0–1	(Sweden) Malmö FF	Istanbul, Turkey
20:55 TRT (UTC+3)	Uysal (yellow card) 61'; Quaresma (red card) 65'	Report	Antonsson 51'	Stadium: Vodafone Park; Attendance: 24,955; Referee: Luca Banti (Italy)

== Squad statistics ==
As of match played 22 May 2019

=== Appearances and goals ===
No.	Pos	Nat	Player	Total		Süper Lig		Turkish Cup		Europa League	
No.	Pos	Nat	Player	Apps	Goals	Apps	Goals	Apps	Goals	Apps	Goals
1	GK	(Germany) GER	Loris Karius	35	0	30	0	0	0	5	0
3	DF	(Brazil) BRA	Adriano	29	0	18+4	0	0	0	7	0
6	DF	(Chile) CHI	Gary Medel	35	0	22+2	0	0	0	11	0
7	MF	(Portugal) POR	Ricardo Quaresma	34	4	21+5	3	0	0	5+3	1
10	MF	(Turkey) TUR	Oğuzhan Özyakup	29	3	10+9	1	0	0	7+3	2
11	FW	(Turkey) TUR	Mustafa Pektemek	18	5	6+7	5	0	0	2+3	0
12	DF	(Chile) CHI	Enzo Roco	10	1	2+4	0	0	0	2+2	1
13	MF	(Canada) CAN	Atiba Hutchinson	27	4	25+2	4	0	0	0	0
14	DF	(Turkey) TUR	Fatih Aksoy	6	0	0+2	0	0	0	2+2	0
15	DF	(France) FRA	Nicolas Isimat-Mirin	14	0	14	0	0	0	0	0
17	MF	(Netherlands) NED	Jeremain Lens	37	5	19+9	1	0	0	9	4
19	FW	(Turkey) TUR	Güven Yalçın	24	8	14+8	8	0	0	1+1	0
20	MF	(Turkey) TUR	Necip Uysal	28	0	11+7	0	0	0	9+1	0
22	FW	(Serbia) SRB	Adem Ljajić	32	9	25+2	9	0	0	4+1	0
23	MF	(Japan) JPN	Shinji Kagawa	14	4	4+10	4	0	0	0	0
24	DF	(Croatia) CRO	Domagoj Vida	38	3	31	3	0	0	7	0
26	MF	(Turkey) TUR	Dorukhan Toköz	25	3	19+1	3	0	0	3+2	0
29	GK	(Turkey) TUR	Tolga Zengin	9	0	3	0	0	0	6	0
44	MF	(Turkey) TUR	Erdem Seçgin	1	0	0	0	0	0	0+1	0
55	MF	(Turkey) TUR	Gökhan Töre	8	0	1+1	0	0	0	2+4	0
61	DF	(Turkey) TUR	Rıdvan Yılmaz	1	0	0+1	0	0	0	0	0
71	FW	(Turkey) TUR	Burak Yılmaz	15	11	15	11	0	0	0	0
77	DF	(Turkey) TUR	Gökhan Gönül	38	4	27+2	3	0	0	8+1	1
88	DF	(Turkey) TUR	Caner Erkin	39	2	20+8	1	0	0	11	1
95	FW	(Canada) CAN	Cyle Larin	22	4	2+10	1	0	0	9+1	3
97	GK	(Turkey) TUR	Utku Yuvakuran	2	0	1	0	0	0	1	0
Players out on loan:
Players who left Beşiktaş during the season:
5	DF	(Portugal) POR	Pepe	17	5	10	3	0	0	7	2
8	MF	(Netherlands) NED	Ryan Babel	19	6	10+2	4	0	0	5+2	2
9	FW	(Spain) ESP	Álvaro Negredo	6	3	4	2	0	0	0+2	1
18	MF	(Germany) GER	Tolgay Arslan	16	1	5+3	0	0	0	7+1	1
99	FW	(Brazil) BRA	Vágner Love	16	7	5+3	3	0	0	2+6	4

=== Goal scorers ===
Place	Position	Nation	Number	Name	Süper Lig	Turkish Cup	Europa League	Total
1	FW	(Turkey)	71	Burak Yılmaz	11	0	0	11
2	FW	(Serbia)	22	Adem Ljajić	9	0	0	9
3	FW	(Turkey)	19	Güven Yalçın	8	0	0	8
4	FW	(Brazil)	99	Vágner Love	3	0	4	7
5	MF	(Netherlands)	8	Ryan Babel	4	0	2	6
6	FW	(Turkey)	11	Mustafa Pektemek	5	0	0	5
6	DF	(Portugal)	5	Pepe	3	0	2	5
6	MF	(Netherlands)	17	Jeremain Lens	1	0	4	5
9	MF	(Canada)	13	Atiba Hutchinson	4	0	0	4
9	MF	(Japan)	23	Shinji Kagawa	4	0	0	4
9	DF	(Turkey)	77	Gökhan Gönül	3	0	1	4
9	MF	(Portugal)	7	Ricardo Quaresma	3	0	1	4
9	FW	(Canada)	95	Cyle Larin	1	0	3	4
14	MF	(Turkey)	26	Dorukhan Toköz	3	0	0	3
14	DF	(Croatia)	24	Domagoj Vida	3	0	0	3
14	FW	(Spain)	9	Álvaro Negredo	2	0	1	3
14	MF	(Turkey)	10	Oğuzhan Özyakup	1	0	2	3
14				Own goal	3	0	0	3
19	DF	(Turkey)	88	Caner Erkin	1	0	1	2
20	MF	(Germany)	18	Tolgay Arslan	0	0	1	1
20	DF	(Chile)	12	Enzo Roco	0	0	1	1
				TOTALS	72	0	23	95

=== Disciplinary record ===
Number	Nation	Position	Name	Süper Lig		Turkish Cup		Europa League		Total	
Number	Nation	Position	Name	Yellow card	Red card	Yellow card	Red card	Yellow card	Red card	Yellow card	Red card
1	(Germany)	GK	Loris Karius	2	0	0	0	0	0	2	0
3	(Brazil)	DF	Adriano	4	0	0	0	0	0	4	0
6	(Chile)	DF	Gary Medel	10	1	0	0	3	0	13	1
7	(Portugal)	MF	Ricardo Quaresma	7	1	0	0	0	1	7	2
10	(Turkey)	MF	Oğuzhan Özyakup	2	0	0	0	2	0	4	0
11	(Turkey)	FW	Mustafa Pektemek	1	0	0	0	2	0	3	0
12	(Chile)	DF	Enzo Roco	1	0	0	0	2	0	3	0
14	(Turkey)	DF	Fatih Aksoy	1	0	0	0	1	0	2	0
15	(France)	DF	Nicolas Isimat-Mirin	2	0	0	0	0	0	2	0
17	(Netherlands)	MF	Jeremain Lens	9	1	0	0	1	0	10	1
18	(Germany)	MF	Tolgay Arslan	1	0	0	0	1	0	2	0
19	(Turkey)	FW	Güven Yalçın	2	0	0	0	0	0	2	0
20	(Turkey)	MF	Necip Uysal	6	0	0	0	2	0	8	0
22	(Serbia)	FW	Adem Ljajić	7	0	0	0	1	0	8	0
23	(Japan)	MF	Shinji Kagawa	1	0	0	0	0	0	1	0
24	(Croatia)	DF	Domagoj Vida	8	1	0	0	0	0	8	1
26	(Turkey)	MF	Dorukhan Toköz	5	0	0	0	0	0	5	0
71	(Turkey)	FW	Burak Yılmaz	4	0	0	0	0	0	4	0
77	(Turkey)	DF	Gökhan Gönül	3	0	0	0	1	0	4	0
88	(Turkey)	DF	Caner Erkin	13	1	0	0	2	0	15	1
95	(Canada)	FW	Cyle Larin	1	0	0	0	1	0	2	0
Players away on loan:
Players who left Beşiktaş during the season:
5	(Portugal)	DF	Pepe	1	0	0	0	2	0	3	0
8	(Netherlands)	MF	Ryan Babel	1	0	0	0	0	0	1	0
9	(Spain)	FW	Álvaro Negredo	0	0	0	0	2	1	2	1
			TOTALS	90	5	0	0	23	2	114	7
