= Paul Pöpperl =

German footballer (born 2003)

Personal information
- Full name: Paul Friedrich Pöpperl
- Date of birth: 25 February 2003 (age 23)
- Place of birth: Herborn, Germany
- Height: 1.80 m (5 ft 11 in)
- Position: Attacking midfielder

Youth career
- –2017: VfB Marburg
- 2017–2022: TSG Wieseck

Senior career*
Years	Team	Apps	(Gls)
2022–2023	TSV Steinbach II	35	(11)
2023–2026	Schalke 04 II	49	(6)
2024–2026	Schalke 04	3	(0)
2024	→ VVV-Venlo (loan)	17	(1)
2025	→ Viktoria Köln (loan)	9	(0)
- * Club domestic league appearances and goals as of 17 May 2026

Paul Friedrich Pöpperl (born 25 February 2003) is a German professional footballer who plays as an attacking midfielder.

== Career ==
After playing one season for Schalke II, Pöpperl signed a professional two-year contract with Schalke 04 on 26 June 2024.

He was immediately loaned to VVV-Venlo for the 2024–25 season. On 10 August 2024, he made his professional debut for the club in a 1–1 away draw against ADO Den Haag. On 3 January 2025, he was loaned to 3. Liga club Viktoria Köln for the remainder of the season.

He made his first team debut for Schalke 04 in the 2. Bundesliga in a 2–1 home win against SC Paderborn on 28 November 2025.

== Career statistics ==
As of 11 February 2026

Appearances and goals by club, season and competition
Club	Season	League			National cup (Note: Includes KNVB Cup)		Total	
Club	Season	Division	Apps	Goals	Apps	Goals	Apps	Goals
TSV Steinbach II	2022–23	Hessenliga	35	11	—		35	11
Schalke 04 II	2023–24	Regionalliga West	33	5	—		33	5
Schalke 04 II	2025–26	Regionalliga West	16	1	—		16	1
Schalke 04 II	Total		49	6	—		49	6
VVV-Venlo (loan)	2024–25	Eerste Divisie	17	1	1	0	18	1
Viktoria Köln (loan)	2024–25	3. Liga	9	0	—		9	0
Schalke 04	2025–26	2. Bundesliga	3	0	0	0	3	0
Career total			113	18	1	0	114	18

== Honours ==
Schalke 04

- 2. Bundesliga: 2025–26
