= Niklas May =

German footballer (born 2002)

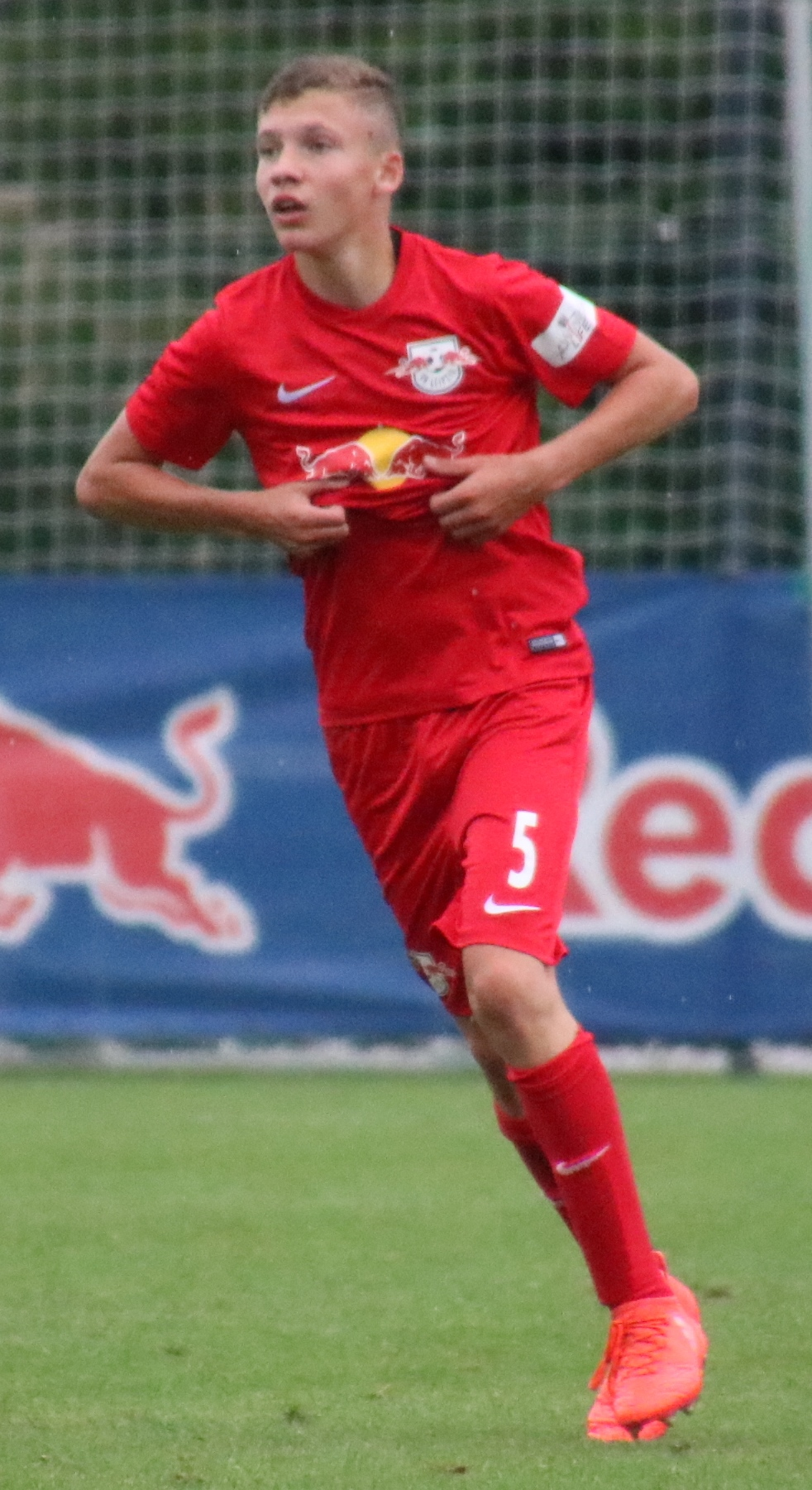
- Niklas May playing for RB Leipzig in 2017.

Personal information
- Date of birth: 10 April 2002 (age 24)
- Place of birth: Freiberg, Germany
- Height: 1.81 m (5 ft 11 in)
- Position: Midfielder

Team information
- Current team: Wehen Wiesbaden
- Number: 5

Youth career
- –2019: RB Leipzig
- 2019–2021: Viktoria Köln

Senior career*
Years	Team	Apps	(Gls)
2021–2025	Viktoria Köln	113	(2)
2025–	Wehen Wiesbaden	34	(0)
- * Club domestic league appearances and goals as of 29 May 2026

Niklas May (born 10 April 2002) is a German professional footballer who plays as a midfielder for 3. Liga club Wehen Wiesbaden.

== Career ==
On 27 May 2025, May signed a two-season contract with Wehen Wiesbaden.
