= Justin Heekeren =

German footballer (born 2000)

Personal information
- Date of birth: 27 November 2000 (age 25)
- Place of birth: Alpen-Veen, Germany
- Height: 1.96 m (6 ft 5 in)
- Position: Goalkeeper

Team information
- Current team: Anderlecht
- Number: 32

Youth career
- 2005–2013: Borussia Veen
- 2013–2014: SSV Rheintreu Lüttingen
- 2014–2015: VfB Homberg
- 2015–2017: Borussia Mönchengladbach
- 2017–2019: Rot-Weiß Oberhausen

Senior career*
Years	Team	Apps	(Gls)
2019–2022	Rot-Weiß Oberhausen	53	(1)
2022–2026	Schalke 04	31	(0)
2022–2023	Schalke 04 II	22	(0)
2024	→ Patro Eisden (loan)	12	(0)
2026–	Anderlecht	1	(0)
- * Club domestic league appearances and goals as of 24 May 2026

Justin Heekeren (born 27 November 2000) is a German professional footballer who plays as a goalkeeper for Belgian Pro League club Anderlecht.

== Club career ==
On 9 June 2022, Heekeren agreed to join Schalke 04 from Rot-Weiß Oberhausen, signing a three-year contract with an option for a further year. On 24 January 2024, he was loaned to Patro Eisden until the end of the season.

On 20 January 2026, he moved to Belgian club Anderlecht.

== Career statistics ==
As of 18 October 2026

Appearances and goals by club, season and competition
Club	Season	League			National cup (Note: Includes DFB-Pokal)		Other		Total	
Club	Season	Division	Apps	Goals	Apps	Goals	Apps	Goals	Apps	Goals
Rot-Weiß Oberhausen	2019–20	Regionalliga West	0	0	—		—		0	0
Rot-Weiß Oberhausen	2020–21	Regionalliga West	16	0	—		—		16	0
Rot-Weiß Oberhausen	2021–22	Regionalliga West	37	1	—		—		37	1
Rot-Weiß Oberhausen	Total		53	1	—		—		53	1
Schalke 04 II	2022–23	Regionalliga West	15	0	—		—		15	0
Schalke 04 II	2023–24	Regionalliga West	7	0	—		—		7	0
Schalke 04 II	Total		22	0	—		—		22	0
Schalke 04	2022–23	Bundesliga	0	0	0	0	—		0	0
Schalke 04	2023–24	2. Bundesliga	2	0	0	0	—		2	0
Schalke 04	2024–25	2. Bundesliga	29	0	1	0	—		30	0
Schalke 04	2025–26	2. Bundesliga	0	0	1	0	—		1	0
Schalke 04	Total		31	0	2	0	—		33	0
Patro Eisden (loan)	2023–24	Challenger Pro League	12	0	—		2 (Note: Appearances in Challenger Pro League promotion play-offs)	0	14	0
Anderlecht	2025–26	Belgian Pro League	1	0	0	0	—		1	0
Anderlecht	2026–27	Belgian Pro League	0	0	1	0	0	0	1	0
Anderlecht	Total		1	0	1	0	0	0	2	0
Career total			119	1	3	0	2	0	124	1
