= Lars Dietz =

German footballer (born 1997)

Personal information
- Date of birth: 7 January 1997 (age 29)
- Place of birth: Bad Sassendorf, Germany
- Height: 1.90 m (6 ft 3 in)
- Position: Centre-back

Team information
- Current team: Patro Eisden

Youth career
- –2009: Rot Weiss Ahlen
- 2009–2016: Borussia Dortmund

Senior career*
Years	Team	Apps	(Gls)
2015–2018	Borussia Dortmund II	38	(3)
2018–2020	Union Berlin	0	(0)
2018–2019	→ Sportfreunde Lotte (loan)	16	(0)
2019–2020	→ Viktoria Köln (loan)	21	(0)
2020–2022	Würzburger Kickers	43	(4)
2022–2026	Viktoria Köln	109	(1)
2026–	Patro Eisden	0	(0)

International career
2016	Germany U20	7	(0)
- * Club domestic league appearances and goals as of 29 May 2026

Lars Dietz (born 7 January 1997) is a German professional footballer who plays as a centre-back for Belgian Challenger Pro League club Patro Eisden.

== Club career ==
Dietz began his career in Rot Weiss Ahlen's youth system, before joining Borussia Dortmund in 2009. Despite never making a first team appearance for Borussia Dortmund, Dietz played 38 league games for the club's reserve team in the Regionalliga over the course of three seasons.

On 3 January 2018, Union Berlin confirmed the signing of Dietz on a contract running until the summer of 2021. On 31 August 2018, Dietz joined 3. Liga club Sportfreunde Lotte on loan for the rest of the 2018–19 season.

On 13 August 2019, Dietz joined Viktoria Köln on loan until the end of 2019–20 season.

== International career ==
Dietz made seven appearances for Germany U20, making his debut in a 1–0 loss against Italy U20 as a substitute on 1 September 2016.
