= Christoph Greger =

German footballer

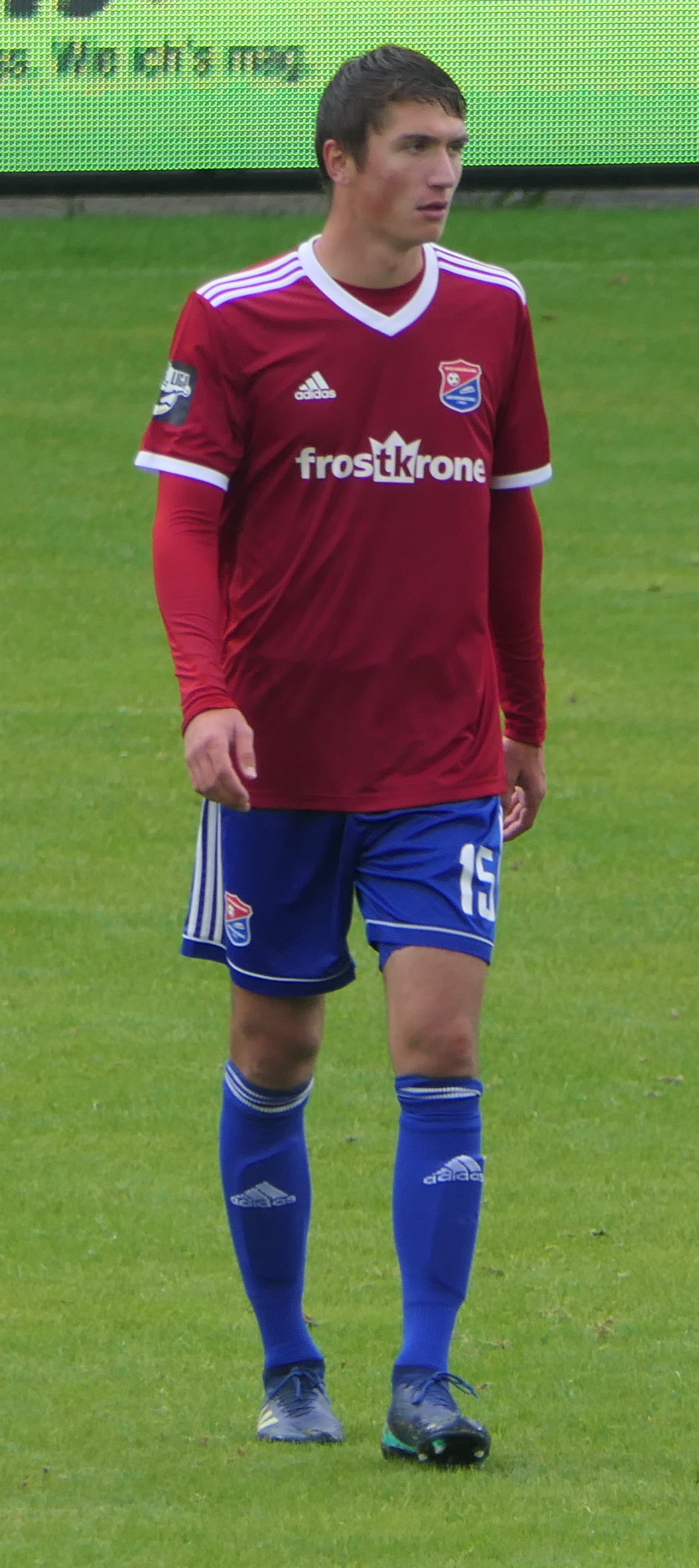
- Greger with SpVgg Unterhaching in 2018

Personal information
- Date of birth: 14 January 1997 (age 29)
- Place of birth: Munich, Germany
- Height: 1.93 m (6 ft 4 in)
- Position: Centre-back

Team information
- Current team: Viktoria Köln
- Number: 15

Youth career
- SV Lochhausen
- –2016: 1860 Munich

Senior career*
Years	Team	Apps	(Gls)
2016–2021	SpVgg Unterhaching	143	(9)
2021–	Viktoria Köln	126	(1)
- * Club domestic league appearances and goals as of 29 May 2026

Christoph Greger (born 14 January 1997) is a German professional footballer who plays as a centre-back for and captains 3. Liga club Viktoria Köln.
