= 2023–24 FC Schalke 04 season =

Schalke 04
2023–24 season
- CEO: Bernd Schröder (until 31 July); Matthias Tillmann (from 1 January)
- Head coach: Thomas Reis (until 27 September); Matthias Kreutzer (interim, from 27 September to 8 October); Karel Geraerts (from 9 October)
- Stadium: Veltins-Arena
- 2. Bundesliga: 10th
- DFB-Pokal: Second round
- Top goalscorer: League: Kenan Karaman (13); All: Kenan Karaman (14)
Home colours	Away colours	Third colours

The 2023–24 FC Schalke 04 season was the 120th season in the football and their seventh season in the 2. Bundesliga, where they were relegated from the Bundesliga the previous season. In addition to the domestic league, Schalke also participated in this season's edition of the domestic cup, the DFB-Pokal. This was the 23rd season for Schalke in the Veltins-Arena, located in Gelsenkirchen, North Rhine-Westphalia. The season covered a period from 1 July 2023 to 30 June 2024. Schalke 04 drew an average home attendance of 61,388 in 17 home games in the 2023–24 league season.

== Players ==
Note: Players' appearances and goals only in their Schalke career.

As of end of 2023–24 season.

No.	Player	Nat.	Pos.	Age	Contract		League		Total	
No.	Player	Nat.	Pos.	Age	began	ends	Apps	Goals	Apps	Goals
Goalkeepers
1	Ralf Fährmann	(Germany)	GK	35	Jul 2011	Jun 2025	227	0	289	0
32	Marius Müller	(Germany)	GK	30	Jul 2023	Jun 2025	21	0	22	0
34	Michael Langer	(Austria)	GK	39	Aug 2017	Jun 2024	8	0	8	0
Defenders
2	Thomas Ouwejan	(Netherlands)	DF	28	Jul 2021	Jun 2024	73	5	77	5
3	Leo Greiml	(Austria)	DF	23	Jul 2022	Jun 2025	7	0	7	0
5	Derry Murkin	(England)	DF	24	Aug 2023	Jun 2026	23	1	24	1
21	Brandon Soppy	(France)	DF	22	Feb 2024	Jun 2024	5	0	5	0
22	Ibrahima Cissé	(Mali)	DF	23	Jul 2022	Jun 2026	4	0	5	0
25	Timo Baumgartl	(Germany)	DF	28	Jul 2023	Jun 2025	12	0	13	0
26	Tomáš Kalas	(Czech Republic)	DF	31	Aug 2023	Jun 2025	25	1	26	1
27	Cédric Brunner	(Switzerland)	DF	30	Jul 2022	Jun 2024	45	0	47	0
35	Marcin Kamiński	(Poland)	DF	32	Jul 2021	Jun 2025	69	6	74	8
41	Henning Matriciani	(Germany)	DF	24	Sep 2021	Jun 2026	60	0	63	0
Midfielders
6	Ron Schallenberg	(Germany)	MF	25	Jul 2023	Jun 2026	26	0	28	0
7	Paul Seguin	(Germany)	MF	29	Jul 2023	Jun 2026	30	3	31	4
8	Danny Latza	(Germany)	MF	34	Jul 2021	Jun 2024	49	3	53	4
10	Lino Tempelmann	(Germany)	MF	25	Jul 2023	Jun 2026	22	1	23	1
18	Blendi Idrizi	(Kosovo)	MF	26	Jun 2021	Jun 2024	41	3	43	3
23	Darko Churlinov	(North Macedonia)	MF	23	Jan 2024	Jun 2024	32	3	33	3
24	Dominick Drexler	(Germany)	MF	34	Jul 2021	Jun 2025	61	8	65	11
29	Tobias Mohr	(Germany)	MF	28	Jul 2022	Jun 2025	37	1	41	1
43	Assan Ouédraogo	(Germany)	MF	18	Jul 2023	Jun 2027	17	3	17	3
Forwards
9	Simon Terodde (captain)	(Germany)	FW	36	Jul 2021	Jun 2024	90	40	95	40
11	Bryan Lasme	(France)	FW	25	Jul 2023	Jun 2027	27	4	29	4
17	Yusuf Kabadayı	(Germany)	FW	20	Aug 2023	Jun 2024	23	4	24	4
19	Kenan Karaman	(Turkey)	FW	30	Sep 2022	Jun 2025	50	14	53	15
42	Keke Topp	(Germany)	FW	20	Jul 2023	Jun 2025	27	5	27	5

== Transfers ==
=== In ===
Player	Nat.	Pos.	From	Type	Window	Ends	Transfer fee	Ref.
Darko Churlinov	(North Macedonia)	MF	(England) Burnley	Loan (option to buy)	Winter	2024	—	
Brandon Soppy	(France)	DF	(Italy) Atalanta	Loan	Winter	2024	—	
Ron Schallenberg	(Germany)	MF	(Germany) SC Paderborn	Transfer	Summer	2026	€2,000,000	
Derry Murkin	(England)	DF	(Netherlands) Volendam	Transfer	Summer	2026	€800,000	
Paul Seguin	(Germany)	MF	(Germany) Union Berlin	Transfer	Summer	2026	€750,000	
Lino Tempelmann	(Germany)	MF	(Germany) SC Freiburg	Transfer	Summer	2026	€700,000	
Marius Müller	(Germany)	GK	(Switzerland) FC Luzern	Transfer	Summer	2025	€350,000	
Timo Baumgartl	(Germany)	DF	(Netherlands) PSV	Transfer	Summer	2025	Free	
Tomáš Kalas	(Czech Republic)	DF	(England) Bristol City	End of contract	Summer	2025	—	
Bryan Lasme	(France)	FW	(Germany) Arminia Bielefeld	End of contract	Summer	2027	—	
Yusuf Kabadayı	(Germany)	FW	(Germany) Bayern Munich	Loan (option to buy)	Summer	2024	—	
Assan Ouédraogo	(Germany)	MF	(Germany) Schalke 04 U19	Promoted	Summer	2027	—	—
Keke Topp	(Germany)	FW	(Germany) Schalke 04 U19	Promoted	Summer	2024	—	—
Kerim Çalhanoğlu	(Germany)	MF	(Germany) SV Sandhausen	Loan return	Summer	2024	—	—
Blendi Idrizi	(Kosovo)	MF	(Germany) Jahn Regensburg	Loan return	Summer	2024	—	—
Marvin Pieringer	(Germany)	FW	(Germany) SC Paderborn	Loan return	Summer	2024	—	—
Dries Wouters	(Belgium)	DF	(Belgium) Mechelen	Loan return	Summer	2024	—	—

=== Out ===
Player	Nat.	Pos.	To	Type	Window	Transfer fee	Ref.
Sōichirō Kōzuki	(Japan)	FW	(Poland) Górnik Zabrze	Loan (option to buy)	Winter	—	
Sebastian Polter	(Germany)	FW	(Germany) Darmstadt 98	Loan (option to buy)	Winter	—	
Justin Heekeren	(Germany)	GK	(Belgium) Patro Eisden	Loan	Winter	—	
Niklas Tauer	(Germany)	MF	(Germany) Mainz 05	End of loan (premature)	Winter	—	
Rodrigo Zalazar	(Uruguay)	MF	(Portugal) Braga	Transfer	Summer	€6,000,000	
Amine Harit	(Morocco)	MF	(France) Marseille	Transfer (Note: Player was previously loaned to the club with an obligation to buy.)	Summer	€5,000,000	
Marius Bülter	(Germany)	FW	(Germany) 1899 Hoffenheim	Transfer	Summer	€3,000,000 (Note: Fee may eventually rise to €4,000,000.)	
Jordan Larsson	(Sweden)	FW	(Denmark) Copenhagen	Transfer (Note: Player was previously loaned to the club.)	Summer	€2,000,000	
Marvin Pieringer	(Germany)	FW	(Germany) 1. FC Heidenheim	Transfer	Summer	€1,500,000	
Can Bozdoğan	(Germany)	MF	(Netherlands) Utrecht	Transfer	Summer	€1,000,000	
Dries Wouters	(Belgium)	DF	(Belgium) Lommel	Transfer	Summer	€600,000	
Florian Flick	(Germany)	MF	(Germany) 1. FC Nürnberg	Transfer	Summer	€500,000	
Reinhold Ranftl	(Austria)	MF	Austria Wien	Transfer	Summer	€200,000	
Kerim Çalhanoğlu	(Germany)	MF	(Germany) Greuther Fürth	Transfer	Summer	€150,000	
Nassim Boujellab	(Morocco)	MF	(Germany) Arminia Bielefeld	End of contract	Summer	—	—
Timothée Kolodziejczak	(France)	DF	Free agent	End of contract	Summer	—	—
Maya Yoshida	(Japan)	DF	(United States) LA Galaxy	End of contract	Summer	—	
Mehmet-Can Aydın	(Turkey)	MF	(Turkey) Trabzonspor	Loan (option to buy)	Summer	—	
Éder Balanta	(Colombia)	MF	(Belgium) Club Brugge	End of loan	Summer	—	
Michael Frey	(Switzerland)	FW	(Belgium) Royal Antwerp	End of loan	Summer	—	
Moritz Jenz	(Germany)	DF	(France) Lorient	End of loan	Summer	—	
Alex Král	(Czech Republic)	MF	(Russia) Spartak Moscow	End of loan	Summer	—	
Tom Krauß	(Germany)	MF	(Germany) RB Leipzig	End of loan	Summer	—	
Alexander Schwolow	(Germany)	GK	(Germany) Hertha BSC	End of loan	Summer	—	
Tim Skarke	(Germany)	FW	(Germany) Union Berlin	End of loan	Summer	—	—
Jere Uronen	(Finland)	DF	(France) Brest	End of loan	Summer	—	
Sepp van den Berg	(Netherlands)	DF	(England) Liverpool	End of loan	Summer	—	—

== Friendly matches ==
Win Draw Loss

1 July 2023 1	SC Spelle-Venhaus	0–3	Schalke 04	Spelle, Germany
15:00 CEST (UTC+2)		Report	Polter 43'; Lasme 56'; Topp 90'	Stadium: Getränke Hoffmann Stadion; Attendance: 3,646; Referee: Jost Steenken

6 July 2023 2	1. FC Bocholt	2–2	Schalke 04	Bocholt, Germany
18:00 CEST (UTC+2)	Fakhro 1'; Lorch 11'	Report	Ouédraogo 4'; Terodde 9'	Stadium: Gigaset Arena; Attendance: 3,276; Referee: Lars Aarts

11 July 2023 3	Schalke 04	0–2	Copenhagen	Kufstein, Austria
18:00 CEST (UTC+2)		Report	Gonçalves 35'; Bardghji 39'	Stadium: Kufstein Arena; Attendance: 1,500; Referee: Stjepan Bosnjak

15 July 2023 4	Schalke 04	5–0	Górnik Zabrze	Mittersill, Austria
15:30 CEST (UTC+2)	Karaman 14'; Idrizi 32'; Lasme 67'; Ouédraogo 79'; Kōzuki 89'	Report		Stadium: Waldstadion; Attendance: 700; Referee: Samuel Sampl

22 July 2023 5	Schalke 04	2–2	Twente	Gelsenkirchen, Germany
13:30 CEST (UTC+2)	Karaman 30'; Terodde 40'	Report	Vlap 15'; Steijn 42'	Stadium: Veltins-Arena; Attendance: 33,639; Referee: Leonidas Exuzidis

8 September 2023 6	SSV Ulm	2–4	Schalke 04	Ulm, Germany
18:30 CEST (UTC+2)	Röser 67' (pen.); Kalas 89' (o.g.)	Report	Mohr 43'; Castelle 50'; Polter 59' (pen.); Kōzuki 63'	Stadium: Donaustadion; Attendance: 8,112; Referee: Assad Nouhoum

12 October 2023 7	Schalke 04	4–1	Heracles Almelo	Gelsenkirchen, Germany
13:00 CEST (UTC+2)	Lasme 13'; Terodde 29'; Karaman 59'; Polter 80'	Report	Wehmeyer 11'	Stadium: Parkstadion; Attendance: 1,050; Referee: Lars Bramkamp

15 November 2023 8	PSV	0–2	Schalke 04	Eindhoven, Netherlands
14:00 CET (UTC+1)		Report	Terodde 63'; Topp 90+1'	Stadium: Training ground Attendance: 0 Referee: Luc van Baars

16 November 2023 9	Schalke 04	0–0	Patro Eisden	Gelsenkirchen, Germany
11:00 CET (UTC+1)		Report		Stadium: Training ground Attendance: 0 Referee: Niklas Simpson

6 January 2024 10	Schalke 04	2–3	VfL Wolfsburg	Faro, Portugal
16:30 CET (UTC+1)	Terodde 34'; Baumgartl 90+1'	Report	Kamiński 31'; Černý 43'; Pejčinović 80'	Stadium: Estádio Algarve; Attendance: 250; Referee: Fa Sánhá

9 January 2024 11	Schalke 04	1–1	Recreativo Huelva	Albufeira, Portugal
13:00 CET (UTC+1)	Terodde 78'	Report	Quintana 20'	Stadium: Pine Cliff Resort Albufeira; Attendance: 200

13 January 2024 12	Schalke 04	3–1	Eupen	Gelsenkirchen, Germany
13:30 CET (UTC+1)	Terodde 5', 62' (pen.); Idrizi 18'	Report	Finnbogason 69'	Stadium: Veltins-Arena; Attendance: 14,964; Referee: Robin Braun

7 February 2024 13	Schalke 04	4–1	SC Verl	Gelsenkirchen, Germany
12:00 CET (UTC+1)	Lasme 64'; Castelle 68'; Pöpperl 72'; Amadin 86'	Report	Mannhardt 61'	Stadium: Training ground Attendance: 0

20 March 2024 14	FC Gütersloh	0–1	Schalke 04	Gütersloh, Germany
19:00 CET (UTC+1)		Report	Ouédraogo 61'	Stadium: Heidewaldstadion; Attendance: 3,280; Referee: Cengiz Kabalakli

== Competitions ==
=== Overview ===
Competition	First match	Last match	Starting round	Final position	Record							
Competition	First match	Last match	Starting round	Final position	Pld	W	D	L	GF	GA	GD	Win %
2. Bundesliga	28 July 2023	19 May 2024	Matchday 1	10th	34	12	7	15	53	60	−7	35.29
DFB-Pokal	11 August 2023	31 October 2023	First round	Second round	2	1	0	1	4	3	+1	50.00
Total					36	13	7	16	57	63	−6	36.11

Last updated: 20 May 2024
Source: Soccerway

=== 2. Bundesliga ===
==== League table ====
Pos	Team	Pld	W	D	L	GF	GA	GD	Pts
8	Greuther Fürth	34	14	8	12	50	49	+1	50
9	Hertha BSC	34	13	9	12	69	59	+10	48
10	Schalke 04	34	12	7	15	53	60	−7	43
11	SV Elversberg	34	12	7	15	49	63	−14	43
12	1. FC Nürnberg	34	11	7	16	43	64	−21	40

Source: DFB
Rules for classification: 1) Points; 2) Goal difference; 3) Goals scored; 4) Head-to-head results; 5) Head-to-head away goals scored; 6) Away goals scored; 7) Play-off.
(Rules 4–6 only apply after home and away matches have been played between the tied teams.)

==== Results summary ====
Overall								Home						Away					
Pld	W	D	L	GF	GA	GD	Pts	W	D	L	GF	GA	GD	W	D	L	GF	GA	GD
34	12	7	15	53	60	−7	43	9	4	4	31	21	+10	3	3	11	22	39	−17

Last updated: 20 May 2024.
Source: Soccerway

==== Results by round ====
Round	1	2	3	4	5	6	7	8	9	10	11	12	13	14	15	16	17	18	19	20	21	22	23	24	25	26	27	28	29	30	31	32	33	34
Ground	A	H	A	H	A	H	A	A	H	A	H	A	H	A	H	A	H	H	A	H	A	H	A	H	H	A	H	A	H	A	H	A	H	A
Result	L	W	L	L	D	W	L	L	L	L	W	W	L	L	W	W	D	L	L	W	L	W	L	W	D	L	D	D	W	D	D	W	W	L
Position	16	10	13	15	12	12	16	16	16	16	16	15	16	16	16	13	14	14	15	14	14	14	14	14	14	14	14	13	12	13	12	11	10	10
Points	0	3	3	3	4	7	7	7	7	7	10	13	13	13	16	19	20	20	20	23	23	26	26	29	30	30	31	32	35	36	37	40	43	43

Updated to match(es) played on 19 May 2024. Source: DFB
A = Away; H = Home; W = Win; D = Draw; L = Loss

==== Matches ====
28 July 2023 1	Hamburger SV	5–3	Schalke 04	Hamburg
20:30 CEST (UTC+2)	Glatzel 17', 90+1'; Bénes 56' (pen.), 60'; Dompé 90+9'	Report	Ouédraogo 22'; Ouwejan 45+1'; Terodde 66'	Stadium: Volksparkstadion; Attendance: 57,000; Referee: Matthias Jöllenbeck

5 August 2023 2	Schalke 04	3–0	1. FC Kaiserslautern	Gelsenkirchen
20:30 CEST (UTC+2)	Terodde 30'; Karaman 70'; Lasme 90+2'	Report		Stadium: Veltins-Arena; Attendance: 61,801; Referee: Harm Osmers

20 August 2023 3	Eintracht Braunschweig	1–0	Schalke 04	Braunschweig
13:30 CEST (UTC+2)	Kaufmann 21'	Report		Stadium: Eintracht-Stadion; Attendance: 21,800; Referee: Bastian Dankert

25 August 2023 4	Schalke 04	0–2	Holstein Kiel	Gelsenkirchen
18:30 CEST (UTC+2)		Report	Pichler 15'; Machino 59'	Stadium: Veltins-Arena; Attendance: 60,403; Referee: Deniz Aytekin

2 September 2023 5	Wehen Wiesbaden	1–1	Schalke 04	Wiesbaden
13:00 CEST (UTC+2)	Reinthaler 90+5'	Report	Mohr 54'	Stadium: Brita-Arena; Attendance: 11,004; Referee: Florian Exner

16 September 2023 6	Schalke 04	4–3	1. FC Magdeburg	Gelsenkirchen
20:30 CEST (UTC+2)	Polter 40', 79' (pen.); Murkin 62'; Ouwejan 69'	Report	Gnaka 16', 27'; Krempicki 67'	Stadium: Veltins-Arena; Attendance: 61,755; Referee: Michael Bacher

23 September 2023 7	FC St. Pauli	3–1	Schalke 04	Hamburg
20:30 CEST (UTC+2)	Hartel 21' (pen.), 57'; Boukhalfa 90+2'	Report	Polter 29'	Stadium: Millerntor-Stadion; Attendance: 29,546; Referee: Frank Willenborg

29 September 2023 8	SC Paderborn	3–1	Schalke 04	Paderborn
18:30 CEST (UTC+2)	Platte 43'; Muslija 53' (pen.), 76'	Report	Kabadayı 90+9'	Stadium: Home Deluxe Arena; Attendance: 15,000; Referee: Timo Gerach

8 October 2023 9	Schalke 04	1–2	Hertha BSC	Gelsenkirchen
13:30 CEST (UTC+2)	Kabadayı 80'	Report	Prevljak 41'; Reese 51'	Stadium: Veltins-Arena; Attendance: 61,887; Referee: Harm Osmers

22 October 2023 10	Karlsruher SC	3–0	Schalke 04	Karlsruhe
13:30 CEST (UTC+2)	Stindl 22'; Matanović 37'; Matriciani 75' (o.g.)	Report		Stadium: Wildparkstadion; Attendance: 33,000; Referee: Florian Heft

28 October 2023 11	Schalke 04	3–2	Hannover 96	Gelsenkirchen
13:00 CEST (UTC+2)	Lasme 42'; Tempelmann 72'; Karaman 77'	Report	Leopold 52'; Halstenberg 90' (pen.)	Stadium: Veltins-Arena; Attendance: 62,271; Referee: Timo Gerach

4 November 2023 12	1. FC Nürnberg	1–2	Schalke 04	Nuremberg
13:00 CET (UTC+1)	Flick 47'	Report	Drexler 36'; Latza 89'	Stadium: Max-Morlock-Stadion; Attendance: 50,000; Referee: Wolfgang Haslberger

10 November 2023 13	Schalke 04	1–2	SV Elversberg	Gelsenkirchen
18:30 CET (UTC+1)	Karaman 35'	Report	Stock 7'; Rochelt 21'	Stadium: Veltins-Arena; Attendance: 61,110; Referee: Martin Petersen

25 November 2023 14	Fortuna Düsseldorf	5–3	Schalke 04	Düsseldorf
20:30 CET (UTC+1)	Vermeij 13', 26'; Klaus 19'; Tzolis 65'; Niemiec 90+4'	Report	Kamiński 57'; Kalas 74'; Lasme 75'	Stadium: Merkur Spiel-Arena; Attendance: 52,000; Referee: Robert Schröder

1 December 2023 15	Schalke 04	4–0	VfL Osnabrück	Gelsenkirchen
18:30 CET (UTC+1)	Kamiński 20'; Seguin 49'; Terodde 63' (pen.); Kleinhansl 70' (o.g.)	Report		Stadium: Veltins-Arena; Attendance: 62,093; Referee: Tim Bauer

10 December 2023 16	Hansa Rostock	0–2	Schalke 04	Rostock
13:30 CET (UTC+1)		Report	Idrizi 72'; Karaman 86'	Stadium: Ostseestadion; Attendance: 27,250; Referee: Nicolas Winter

15 December 2023 17	Schalke 04	2–2	Greuther Fürth	Gelsenkirchen
18:30 CET (UTC+1)	Topp 30'; Karaman 74'	Report	Hrgota 50'; Asta 77'	Stadium: Veltins-Arena; Attendance: 60,166; Referee: Daniel Siebert

20 January 2024 18	Schalke 04	0–2	Hamburger SV	Gelsenkirchen
20:30 CET (UTC+1)		Report	Pherai 22'; Bénes 35'	Stadium: Veltins-Arena; Attendance: 61,992; Referee: Sven Jablonski

26 January 2024 19	1. FC Kaiserslautern	4–1	Schalke 04	Kaiserslautern
18:30 CET (UTC+1)	Ache 10', 59'; Stojilković 67'; Opoku 70'	Report	Churlinov 51'	Stadium: Fritz-Walter-Stadion; Attendance: 49,327; Referee: Robin Braun

3 February 2024 20	Schalke 04	1–0	Eintracht Braunschweig	Gelsenkirchen
13:00 CET (UTC+1)	Karaman 61'	Report		Stadium: Veltins-Arena; Attendance: 61,219; Referee: Sascha Stegemann

11 February 2024 21	Holstein Kiel	1–0	Schalke 04	Kiel
13:30 CET (UTC+1)	Skrzybski 55'	Report		Stadium: Holstein-Stadion; Attendance: 15,900; Referee: Arne Aarnink

17 February 2024 22	Schalke 04	1–0	Wehen Wiesbaden	Gelsenkirchen
13:00 CET (UTC+1)	Karaman 60' (pen.)	Report		Stadium: Veltins-Arena; Attendance: 60,542; Referee: Deniz Aytekin

24 February 2024 23	1. FC Magdeburg	3–0	Schalke 04	Magdeburg
20:30 CET (UTC+1)	Gnaka 17'; El Hankouri 35' (pen.); Ito 45+2'	Report		Stadium: MDCC-Arena; Attendance: 27,038; Referee: Christian Dingert

1 March 2024 24	Schalke 04	3–1	FC St. Pauli	Gelsenkirchen
18:30 CET (UTC+1)	Kabadayı 44', 73'; Karaman 90+2'	Report	Saad 89'	Stadium: Veltins-Arena; Attendance: 61,497; Referee: Daniel Siebert

9 March 2024 25	Schalke 04	3–3	SC Paderborn	Gelsenkirchen
13:00 CET (UTC+1)	Karaman 32' (pen.); Lasme 50'; Topp 90+2'	Report	Zehnter 60'; Kinsombi 78' (pen.); Klaas 86'	Stadium: Veltins-Arena; Attendance: 61,475; Referee: Robert Kampka

17 March 2024 26	Hertha BSC	5–2	Schalke 04	Berlin
13:30 CET (UTC+1)	Tabakovic 2', 13'; Winkler 39', 56'; Niederlechner 75'	Report	Terodde 5', 27'	Stadium: Olympiastadion; Attendance: 69,156; Referee: Sven Jablonski

31 March 2024 27	Schalke 04	0–0	Karlsruher SC	Gelsenkirchen
13:30 CEST (UTC+2)		Report		Stadium: Veltins-Arena; Attendance: 61,653; Referee: Robert Hartmann

7 April 2024 28	Hannover 96	1–1	Schalke 04	Hanover
13:30 CEST (UTC+2)	Seguin 81' (o.g.)	Report	Ouédraogo 17'	Stadium: Heinz von Heiden Arena; Attendance: 49,000; Referee: Frank Willenborg

13 April 2024 29	Schalke 04	2–0	1. FC Nürnberg	Gelsenkirchen
20:30 CEST (UTC+2)	Karaman 42'; Seguin 86'	Report		Stadium: Veltins-Arena; Attendance: 62,278; Referee: Marco Fritz

19 April 2024 30	SV Elversberg	1–1	Schalke 04	Spiesen-Elversberg
18:30 CEST (UTC+2)	Le Joncour 18'	Report	Topp 59'	Stadium: Waldstadion an der Kaiserlinde; Attendance: 10,000; Referee: Patrick Schwengers

27 April 2024 31	Schalke 04	1–1	Fortuna Düsseldorf	Gelsenkirchen
20:30 CEST (UTC+2)	Karaman 55'	Report	Tanaka 67'	Stadium: Veltins-Arena; Attendance: 61,854; Referee: Harm Osmers

7 May 2024 32	VfL Osnabrück	0–4	Schalke 04	Hamburg
18:30 CEST (UTC+2)		Report	Topp 2', 75'; Karaman 5'; Ouédraogo 65'	Stadium: Millerntor-Stadion; Attendance: 0 Referee: Michael Bacher
Note: The match was originally scheduled to be played on 4 May 2024, but was postponed and removed to Hamburg due to structural defects in the roof of Stadion an der Bremer Brücke in Osnabrück. It was played behind closed doors.

11 May 2024 33	Schalke 04	2–1	Hansa Rostock	Gelsenkirchen
13:00 CEST (UTC+2)	Karaman 22'; Seguin 45+5'	Report	Singh 32'	Stadium: Veltins-Arena; Attendance: 61,533; Referee: Tobias Reichel

19 May 2024 34	Greuther Fürth	2–0	Schalke 04	Fürth
15:30 CEST (UTC+2)	Hrgota 67'; Lemperle 82'	Report		Stadium: Sportpark Ronhof Thomas Sommer; Attendance: 16,126; Referee: Patrick Schwengers

=== DFB-Pokal ===
11 August 2023 1st round	Eintracht Braunschweig	1–3	Schalke 04	Braunschweig
20:45 CEST (UTC+2)	Ujah 12'	Report	Seguin 19'; Karaman 42'; Latza 90+4'	Stadium: Eintracht-Stadion; Attendance: 21,800; Referee: Patrick Ittrich

31 October 2023 2nd round	FC St. Pauli	2–1 (a.e.t.)	Schalke 04	Hamburg
18:00 CET (UTC+1)	Hartel 57' (pen.); Eggestein 102'	Report	Kamiński 16'	Stadium: Millerntor-Stadion; Attendance: 28,589; Referee: Bastian Dankert

== Statistics ==
As of end of 2023–24 season

=== Squad statistics ===
No.	Player	Nat	Pos	2. Bundesliga					DFB-Pokal					Total				
No.	Player	Nat	Pos	App	St	Goal	Yellow card	Red card	App	St	Goal	Yellow card	Red card	App	St	Goal	Yellow card	Red card
1	Ralf Fährmann	(Germany)	GK	9	9	0	1	0	1	1	0	0	0	10	10	0	1	0
32	Marius Müller	(Germany)	GK	21	21	0	1	0	1	1	0	0	0	22	22	0	1	0
34	Michael Langer	(Austria)	GK	3	2	0	0	0	0	0	0	0	0	3	2	0	0	0
~~28~~	Justin Heekeren (Note: Player transferred out during the season)	(Germany)	GK	2	2	0	0	0	0	0	0	0	0	2	2	0	0	0
2	Thomas Ouwejan	(Netherlands)	DF	28	26	2	3	0	0	0	0	0	0	28	26	2	3	0
3	Leo Greiml	(Austria)	DF	0	0	0	0	0	0	0	0	0	0	0	0	0	0	0
5	Derry Murkin	(England)	DF	23	21	1	6	1	1	1	0	0	0	24	22	1	6	1
21	Brandon Soppy	(France)	DF	5	4	0	1	0	0	0	0	0	0	5	4	0	1	0
22	Ibrahima Cissé	(Mali)	DF	4	3	0	1	1	1	1	0	0	0	5	4	0	1	1
25	Timo Baumgartl	(Germany)	DF	12	11	0	0	0	1	1	0	0	0	13	12	0	0	0
26	Tomáš Kalas	(Czech Republic)	DF	25	24	1	1	0	1	0	0	0	0	26	24	1	1	0
27	Cédric Brunner	(Switzerland)	DF	17	14	0	5	0	1	1	0	0	0	18	15	0	5	0
35	Marcin Kamiński	(Poland)	DF	30	29	2	5	0	2	2	1	0	0	32	31	3	5	0
40	Taylan Bulut (Note: Player from Schalke 04 U19)	(Germany)	DF	1	0	0	0	0	0	0	0	0	0	1	0	0	0	0
41	Henning Matriciani	(Germany)	DF	25	12	0	2	0	2	2	0	1	0	27	14	0	3	0
51	Steven van der Sloot (Note: Player from Schalke 04 II)	(Netherlands)	DF	7	3	0	2	0	0	0	0	0	0	7	3	0	2	0
~~39~~	Joey Müller	(Germany)	DF	1	0	0	0	0	0	0	0	0	0	1	0	0	0	0
6	Ron Schallenberg	(Germany)	MF	26	24	0	6	1	2	2	0	1	0	28	26	0	7	1
7	Paul Seguin	(Germany)	MF	30	25	3	8	0	1	1	1	0	0	31	26	4	8	0
8	Danny Latza	(Germany)	MF	11	2	1	1	0	2	1	1	0	0	13	3	2	1	0
10	Lino Tempelmann	(Germany)	MF	22	13	1	2	0	1	1	0	0	1	23	14	1	2	1
18	Blendi Idrizi	(Kosovo)	MF	16	7	1	2	0	0	0	0	0	0	16	7	1	2	0
23	Darko Churlinov	(North Macedonia)	MF	10	4	1	3	0	0	0	0	0	0	10	4	1	3	0
24	Dominick Drexler	(Germany)	MF	11	7	1	0	0	1	1	0	1	0	12	8	1	1	0
29	Tobias Mohr	(Germany)	MF	19	10	1	2	0	2	1	0	0	0	21	11	1	2	0
43	Assan Ouédraogo	(Germany)	MF	17	9	3	2	0	0	0	0	0	0	17	9	3	2	0
45	Jimmy Kaparos	(Netherlands)	DF	1	0	0	0	0	0	0	0	0	0	1	0	0	0	0
~~21~~	Niklas Tauer	(Germany)	MF	1	1	0	0	0	1	0	0	0	0	2	1	0	0	0
9	Simon Terodde	(Germany)	FW	28	23	5	1	0	2	2	0	0	0	30	25	5	1	0
11	Bryan Lasme	(France)	FW	27	13	4	2	0	2	1	0	0	0	29	14	4	2	0
17	Yusuf Kabadayı	(Germany)	FW	24	11	4	6	0	1	0	0	1	0	23	11	4	5	0
19	Kenan Karaman	(Turkey)	FW	29	28	13	3	1	2	2	1	0	0	31	30	14	3	1
42	Keke Topp	(Germany)	FW	25	11	5	4	0	0	0	0	0	0	25	11	5	4	0
44	Niklas Castelle	(Germany)	FW	1	0	0	0	0	0	0	0	0	0	1	0	0	0	0
~~14~~	Sōichirō Kōzuki	(Japan)	FW	5	1	0	0	0	1	0	0	0	0	6	1	0	0	0
~~40~~	Sebastian Polter	(Germany)	FW	11	4	3	3	0	2	0	0	0	0	13	4	3	3	0
Total				34		52	72	4	2		4	4	1	36		56	76	5

=== Goalscorers ===
Rank	Player	Nat	Pos	2. Liga	DFB-Pokal	Total
1	Kenan Karaman	(Turkey)	FW	13	1	14
2	Simon Terodde	(Germany)	FW	5	0	5
2	Keke Topp	(Germany)	FW	5	0	5
4	Yusuf Kabadayı	(Germany)	FW	4	0	4
4	Bryan Lasme	(France)	FW	4	0	4
4	Paul Seguin	(Germany)	MF	3	1	4
7	Assan Ouédraogo	(Germany)	MF	3	0	3
7	Sebastian Polter	(Germany)	FW	3	0	3
7	Marcin Kamiński	(Poland)	DF	2	1	3
10	Thomas Ouwejan	(Netherlands)	DF	2	0	2
10	Danny Latza	(Germany)	MF	1	1	2
12	Darko Churlinov	(North Macedonia)	MF	1	0	1
12	Dominick Drexler	(Germany)	MF	1	0	1
12	Blendi Idrizi	(Kosovo)	MF	1	0	1
12	Tomáš Kalas	(Czech Republic)	DF	1	0	1
12	Tobias Mohr	(Germany)	MF	1	0	1
12	Derry Murkin	(England)	DF	1	0	1
12	Lino Tempelmann	(Germany)	MF	1	0	1
Own goals				1	0	1
Total				53	4	57

=== Clean sheets ===
Rank	Player	Nat	2. Liga	DFB-Pokal	Total
1	Marius Müller	(Germany)	6	0	6
2	Ralf Fährmann	(Germany)	2	0	2
