= Yaroslav Mikhaylov =

Russian footballer (born 2003)

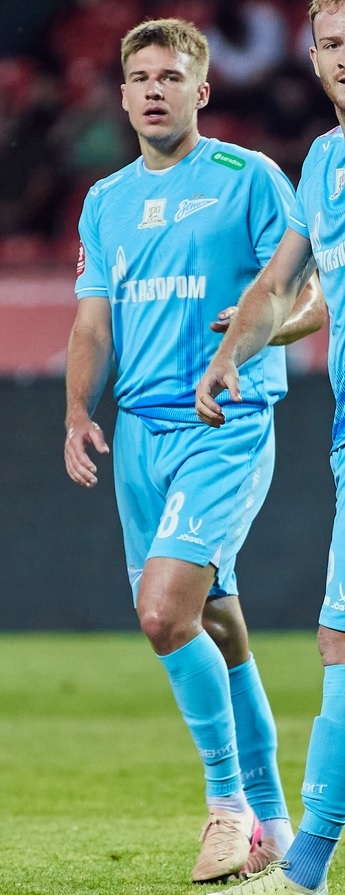
- Mikhaylov with Zenit in 2025

Personal information
- Full name: Yaroslav Yuryevich Mikhaylov
- Date of birth: 28 April 2003 (age 23)
- Place of birth: Pytalovo, Russia
- Height: 1.82 m (6 ft 0 in)
- Position: Attacking midfielder

Team information
- Current team: Rostov
- Number: 5

Youth career
- 2008–2012: Pskov-747
- 2012–2021: Zenit Saint Petersburg

Senior career*
Years	Team	Apps	(Gls)
2021–2023	Zenit Saint Petersburg	1	(0)
2021–2022	→ Schalke 04 (loan)	8	(0)
2022	→ Zenit-2 Saint Petersburg	9	(1)
2022–2023	→ Pari NN (loan)	21	(1)
2023	Pari NN	6	(0)
2023–2026	Zenit Saint Petersburg	1	(0)
2023–2025	→ Orenburg (loan)	41	(0)
2026–	Rostov	10	(0)

International career^{‡}
2019	Russia U-17	3	(0)
2021	Russia U-18	2	(0)
2021	Russia U-19	6	(0)
2022	Russia U-21	3	(1)
- * Club domestic league appearances and goals as of 20 November 2026 ‡ National team caps and goals as of 16 November 2022

Yaroslav Yuryevich Mikhaylov (Russian: Ярослав Юрьевич Михайлов; born 28 April 2003) is a Russian professional footballer who plays as an attacking midfielder for Rostov.

== Club career ==
On 13 July 2021, Mikhaylov moved from Zenit Saint Petersburg to Schalke 04 on a loan deal until the end of the season, after taking part in Schalke training as a guest player for three weeks. He made his professional debut for Schalke in the 2. Bundesliga on 1 August 2021, coming on as a substitute in the 65th minute in a 3–0 away win against Holstein Kiel.

Upon his return from loan, on 21 June 2022 Mikhaylov made his first appearance for Zenit's first squad in a pre-season game against Pari Nizhny Novgorod. He made his Russian Premier League debut for Zenit on 30 July 2022 against Lokomotiv Moscow.

On 9 September 2022, Mikhaylov joined Pari NN on loan with an option to buy. On 3 June 2023, Pari activated their option to buy and made the transfer permanent, signing a four-year contract with Mikhaylov.

On 14 September 2023, Zenit bought back Mikhaylov and signed a four-year contract with him. At the same time, he was sent on loan to Orenburg for the 2023–24 season. On 21 June 2024, the loan to Orenburg was extended for the 2024–25 season.

On 14 July 2026, Mikhaylov signed with Rostov.

== International career ==
Mikhaylov has played several matches for the Russian U-17, U-18 and U-19 national teams.

Mikhaylov was first called up to the Russia national football team for a training camp in September 2023.

== Career statistics ==
As of match played 20 November 2026.

Appearances and goals by club, season and competition
Club	Season	League			Cup		Other		Total	
Club	Season	Division	Apps	Goals	Apps	Goals	Apps	Goals	Apps	Goals
Schalke 04 (loan)	2021–22	2. Bundesliga	8	0	2	1	—		10	1
Zenit-2 St. Petersburg	2022–23	Russian Second League	9	1	—		—		9	1
Zenit St. Petersburg	2022–23	Russian Premier League	1	0	0	0	—		1	0
Nizhny Novgorod (loan)	2022–23	Russian Premier League	21	1	6	0	2 (Note: Appearances in relegation play-offs)	0	29	1
Nizhny Novgorod	2023–24	Russian Premier League	6	0	3	0	—		9	0
Orenburg (loan)	2023–24	Russian Premier League	17	0	6	0	—		23	0
Orenburg (loan)	2024–25	Russian Premier League	24	0	5	1	—		29	1
Orenburg (loan)	Total		41	0	11	1	—		52	1
Zenit St. Petersburg	2025–26	Russian Premier League	1	0	6	0	—		7	0
Rostov	2026–27	Russian Premier League	10	0	4	1	—		14	1
Career total			97	2	32	3	2	0	131	5

== Honours ==
Schalke 04

- 2. Bundesliga: 2021–22

Zenit St. Petersburg

- Russian Premier League: 2022–23, 2025–26
