= Andreas Vindheim =

Norwegian footballer (born 1995)

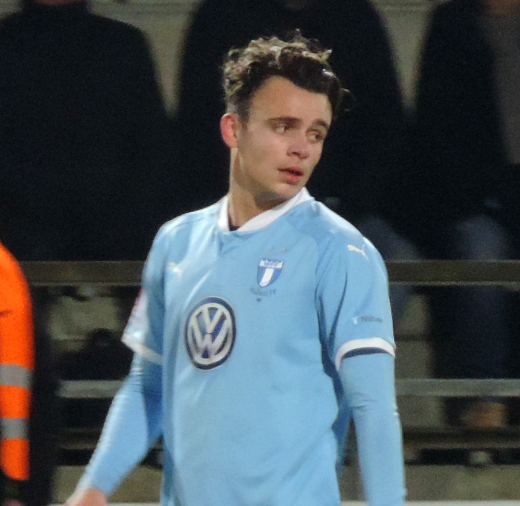
- Vindheim with Malmö FF in 2018

Personal information
- Full name: Andreas Aalen Vindheim
- Date of birth: 4 August 1995 (age 31)
- Place of birth: Bergen, Norway
- Height: 1.83 m (6 ft 0 in)
- Position: Right-back

Youth career
- 2009–2013: Brann

Senior career*
Years	Team	Apps	(Gls)
2012–2014	Brann	22	(2)
2015–2019	Malmö FF	55	(2)
2019–2024	Sparta Prague	44	(3)
2022	→ Schalke 04 (loan)	7	(1)
2022	→ Sparta Prague B	1	(0)
2023	→ Lillestrøm (loan)	1	(0)
2023	→ Teplice (loan)	0	(0)
2025–2026	Åsane	0	(0)

International career^{‡}
2014	Norway U19	3	(0)
2014–2015	Norway U21	7	(0)
2020	Norway	1	(0)
- * Club domestic league appearances and goals as of 27 March 2025 ‡ National team caps and goals as of 18 November 2020

Andreas Aalen Vindheim (born 4 August 1995) is a former Norwegian professional footballer who played as a right-back.

== Club career ==
=== Brann ===
Vindheim was born in Bergen, He started his career at local club Brann and made cup appearances in 2012 and 2013. Vindheim made his league debut for Brann on 4 May 2014 against Start, the game ended 1–1. In total he played 22 league matches for the 2014 season when Brann was relegated from Tippeligaen.

=== Malmö FF ===
On 11 March 2015, Vindheim signed a four-year contract with Swedish champions Malmö FF. He became the third Norwegian player to sign for the club during the 2015 pre-season. In his first three seasons he acted mainly as a back-up for Anton Tinnerholm but when he left after the 2017 season he started to become a regular in the first team. When new manager Uwe Rösler took over Malmö changed to a 3-5-2 formation and Vindheim began playing as a right wing-back.

He played all ten games in Malmö FF's 2018–19 Europa League campaign and scored the first goal in a 2–0 win against Besiktas in the group stage.

=== Sparta Prague ===
On 21 May 2019, Vindheim signed for AC Sparta Prague for a reported fee of €1.2 million.

=== Schalke 04 ===
On 10 January 2022, Vindheim agreed to join Schalke 04 on loan until the end of the 2021–22 season with an option to make the move permanent.

=== Lillestrøm ===
On 21 February 2023, Vindheim agreed to join Lillestrøm on loan until the end of the 2022–23 season with an option to make the move permanent.

=== Teplice ===
On 7 September 2023, Vindheim joined Teplice on loan until the end of the 2023–24 season.

=== Åsane ===
On 27 March 2025, Vindheim returned to Norway to play for Norwegian First Division club Åsane Fotball, signing a contract for the rest of 2025.

== Personal life ==
Andreas Vindheim is the son of former Brann, Sogndal and Burnley midfielder Rune Vindheim. He is currently in a relationship with Vilde Bøe Risa, also a footballer.

== Career statistics ==
=== Club ===
As of 17 May 2022

Appearances and goals by club, season and competition
Club	Season	League			Cup		Europe		Other (Note: Includes Tippeligaen playoffs)		Total	
Club	Season	Division	Apps	Goals	Apps	Goals	Apps	Goals	Apps	Goals	Apps	Goals
Brann	2012	Tippeligaen	0	0	1	0	—		—		1	0
Brann	2013	Tippeligaen	0	0	1	0	—		—		1	0
Brann	2014	Tippeligaen	22	2	4	1	—		1	0	27	3
Brann	Total		22	2	6	1	—		1	0	29	3
Malmö	2015	Allsvenskan	10	0	0	0	1	0	—		11	0
Malmö	2016	Allsvenskan	6	0	0	0	—		—		6	0
Malmö	2017	Allsvenskan	19	1	0	0	—		—		19	1
Malmö	2018	Allsvenskan	10	1	4	0	11	1	—		25	2
Malmö	2019	Allsvenskan	10	0	1	0	2	0	—		13	0
Malmö	Total		55	2	5	0	14	1	—		74	3
Sparta Prague	2019–20	Czech First League	21	2	4	0	—		—		25	2
Sparta Prague	2020–21	Czech First League	17	1	0	0	5	0	—		22	1
Sparta Prague	2021–22	Czech First League	6	0	2	0	5	0	—		13	0
Sparta Prague	Total		44	3	6	0	10	0	—		60	3
Schalke 04 (loan)	2021–22	2. Bundesliga	7	1	—		—		—		7	1
Career total			128	8	17	1	24	1	1	0	170	10

== Honours ==
Malmö FF

- Allsvenskan: 2016, 2017

Sparta Prague

- Czech Cup: 2019–20

Schalke 04

- 2. Bundesliga: 2021–22
