= Darko Churlinov =

Macedonian footballer (born 2000)

Darko Churlinov Дарко Чурлинов
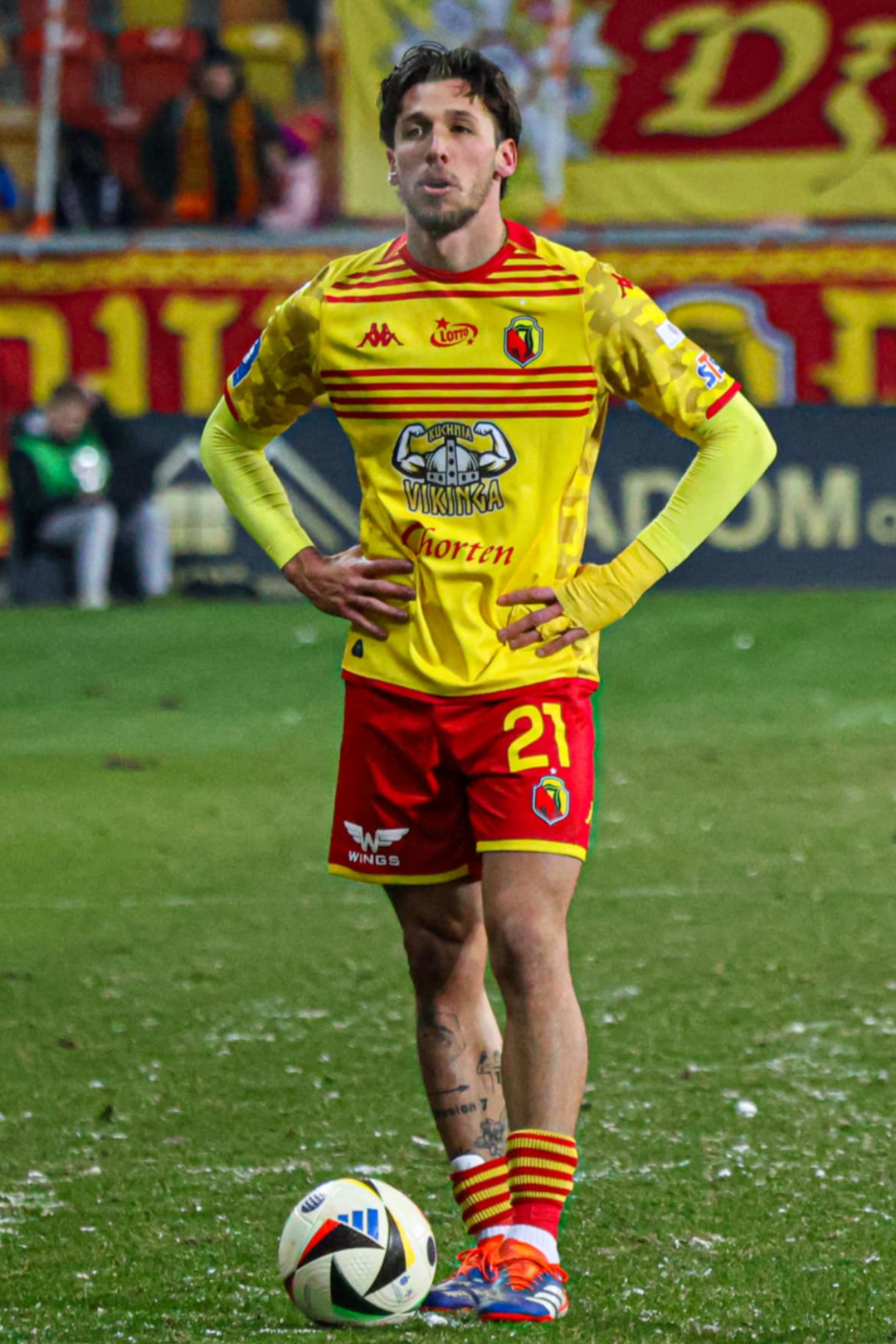
- Churlinov in 2025 with Jagiellonia Białystok

Personal information
- Full name: Darko Churlinov; Дарко Чурлинов
- Date of birth: 11 July 2000 (age 26)
- Place of birth: Skopje, Macedonia
- Height: 1.80 m (5 ft 11 in)
- Position: Winger

Team information
- Current team: Pogoń Szczecin
- Number: 21

Youth career
- 2003–2010: FK Forca
- 2010–2012: FK Rabotnički
- 2012–2014: FK Vardar
- 2014–2015: Hansa Rostock
- 2015–2016: 1. FC Magdeburg
- 2016–2018: 1. FC Köln

Senior career*
Years	Team	Apps	(Gls)
2018–2019	1. FC Köln II	10	(7)
2019	1. FC Köln	1	(0)
2020–2022	VfB Stuttgart	21	(1)
2020	VfB Stuttgart II	1	(0)
2021–2022	→ Schalke 04 (loan)	22	(2)
2022–2025	Burnley	7	(0)
2024	→ Schalke 04 (loan)	10	(1)
2024–2025	→ Jagiellonia Białystok (loan)	26	(5)
2025–2026	Kocaelispor	26	(0)
2026–	Pogoń Szczecin	12	(4)

International career^{‡}
2015	Macedonia U17	4	(0)
2017–2019	Macedonia U19	14	(3)
2018–2021	North Macedonia U21	16	(5)
2017–	North Macedonia	45	(5)
- * Club domestic league appearances and goals as of 12:28, 9 November 2026 (UTC) ‡ National team caps and goals as of 23:55, 16 November 2026 (UTC)

Darko Churlinov (Macedonian: Дарко Чурлинов; born 11 July 2000) is a Macedonian professional footballer who plays as a winger for Ekstraklasa club Pogoń Szczecin and the North Macedonia national team.

== Club career ==
=== Early career ===
Churlinov was born and raised in Skopje, Republic of Macedonia, where he also started playing football with local FK Forca. Subsequently, he went through the youth ranks of FK Rabotnički and FK Vardar until he was 14 years old. He moved to Germany and joined the youth setup of Hansa Rostock, where his friend and fellow Macedonian footballer Dimitar Mitrovski was already playing in the youth teams. Mitrovski had asked the club officials to sign Churlinov as he would like to have a fellow Macedonian as a teammate. He finished his youth career at 1. FC Köln.

=== 1. FC Köln ===
Churlinov started to play for the second team of 1. FC Köln before being promoted to the first team, where he made his debut on 17 August 2019 against VfL Wolfsburg, being subbed on in replacement of Florian Kainz in the 70th minute. He remained on the bench for the rest of his stint with Köln.

=== VfB Stuttgart ===
On 8 January 2020, Churlinov joined VfB Stuttgart on a four-year deal. He made his debut with Stuttgart on 22 February 2020 against SSV Jahn Regensburg, being subbed on in replacement of Silas Katompa in the 71st minute, creating a goal-scoring opportunity. He featured primarily as a substitute throughout the rest of his career with Stuttgart.

==== Loan to Schalke 04 ====
On 18 August 2021, Churlinov joined Schalke 04 on a loan deal until the end of the season. He made his debut with Schalke 04 on 21 August 2021 against SSV Jahn Regensburg, being subbed on for Reinhold Ranftl in the 62nd minute, providing an assist to Simon Terodde's goal in the 81st minute.

=== Burnley ===
On 19 August 2022, Churlinov joined Burnley on a four-year deal for an undisclosed fee. He made his debut with Burnley the next day against Blackpool F.C., where he was subbed on for Vitinho in the 71st minute. On June 1, 2023, he was hospitalized with suspected blood poisoning in Serbia, causing him to miss play for a month in domestic and international play.

==== Loan to Schalke 04 ====
On 23 January 2024, Churlinov returned to Schalke 04 again on loan until the end of the season, with the club having an option to make the move permanent.

On 21 May 2024, Burnley said the player would return after the loan ended.

==== Loan to Jagiellonia ====
On 7 August 2024, Churlinov joined Polish Ekstraklasa champions Jagiellonia Białystok on a season-long loan.

=== Kocaelispor ===
On 1 September 2025, Churlinov moved to Süper Lig club Kocaelispor.

=== Pogoń Szczecin ===
In July 2026, Churlinov was expected to return to Poland and sign with Widzew Łódź. After agreeing terms and passing a medical, he changed his mind and left Łódź on 26 July. The following day, he signed a two-year contract with another Ekstraklasa club Pogoń Szczecin.

== International career ==
On 28 March 2017, at the age of 16 years and 8 months, Churlinov made his debut for the Macedonia national team in a friendly match against Belarus, becoming the youngest player who has ever played for Macedonia's national team. Churlinov scored his first international goal on 4 June 2021, in a friendly match against Kazakhstan.

== Career statistics ==
=== Club ===
As of match played 7 November 2026

Appearances and goals by club, season and competition
Club	Season	League			National cup (Note: Includes DFB-Pokal, FA Cup, Polish Cup, Turkish Cup)		League cup (Note: Includes EFL Cup)		Other		Total	
Club	Season	Division	Apps	Goals	Apps	Goals	Apps	Goals	Apps	Goals	Apps	Goals
1. FC Köln II	2018–19	Regionalliga West	1	0	—		—		—		1	0
1. FC Köln II	2019–20	Regionalliga West	9	7	—		—		—		9	7
1. FC Köln II	Total		10	7	—		—		—		10	7
1. FC Köln	2019–20	Bundesliga	1	0	0	0	—		—		1	0
VfB Stuttgart II	2019–20	Oberliga Baden-Württ.	1	0	—		—		—		1	0
VfB Stuttgart	2019–20	2. Bundesliga	6	1	0	0	—		—		6	1
VfB Stuttgart	2020–21	Bundesliga	14	0	2	0	—		—		16	0
VfB Stuttgart	2021–22	Bundesliga	0	0	1	1	—		—		1	1
VfB Stuttgart	2022–23	Bundesliga	1	0	1	1	—		—		2	1
VfB Stuttgart	Total		21	1	4	2	—		—		25	3
Schalke 04 (loan)	2021–22	2. Bundesliga	22	2	1	0	—		—		23	2
Burnley	2022–23	Championship	7	0	4	0	2	0	—		13	0
Schalke 04 (loan)	2023–24	2. Bundesliga	10	1	—		—		—		10	1
Jagiellonia Białystok (loan)	2024–25	Ekstraklasa	26	5	2	0	—		15 (Note: Two appearances in UEFA Europa League, twelve appearances and two goals in UEFA Conference League, one appearance in Polish Super Cup)	2	43	7
Kocaelispor	2025–26	Süper Lig	26	0	4	2	—		—		30	2
Pogoń Szczecin	2026–27	Ekstraklasa	12	4	1	0	—		—		13	4
Career total			136	20	16	4	2	0	15	2	169	26

=== International ===
As of match played 16 November 2026

Appearances and goals by national team and year
National team	Year	Apps	Goals
North Macedonia	2017	1	0
North Macedonia	2021	12	2
North Macedonia	2022	5	1
North Macedonia	2023	5	1
North Macedonia	2024	7	0
North Macedonia	2025	9	1
North Macedonia	2026	6	0
Total		45	5

Scores and results list North Macedonia's goal tally first, score column indicates score after each Čurlinov goal.

List of international goals scored by Darko Čurlinov
No.	Date	Venue	Opponent	Score	Result	Competition
1	4 June 2021	Toše Proeski Arena, Skopje, North Macedonia	Kazakhstan	4–0	4–0	Friendly
2	8 October 2021	Rheinpark Stadion, Vaduz, Liechtenstein	Liechtenstein	4–0	4–0	2022 FIFA World Cup qualification
3	12 June 2022	Toše Proeski Arena, Skopje, North Macedonia	Gibraltar	4–0	4–0	2022–23 UEFA Nations League C
4	23 March 2023	Toše Proeski Arena, Skopje, North Macedonia	Malta	2–0	2–1	UEFA Euro 2024 qualifying
5	7 September 2025	Toše Proeski Arena, Skopje, North Macedonia	Liechtenstein	3–0	5–0	2026 FIFA World Cup qualification

== Honours ==
Schalke 04

- 2. Bundesliga: 2021–22

Burnley

- EFL Championship: 2022–23

Jagiellonia Białystok

- Polish Super Cup: 2024
