= 2026–27 Pogoń Szczecin season =

Pogoń Szczecin
2026–27 season
- Manager: Óscar García
- Stadium: Florian Krygier Municipal Stadium
- Ekstraklasa: Pre-season
- Polish Cup: Pre-season
Home colours	Away colours	Third colours

The 2026–27 season is the 79th season in the history of Pogoń Szczecin and the 15th consecutive season in Ekstraklasa. The team will also compete in the Polish Cup.

== Transfers ==
=== In ===
Pos.	Player	Transferred from	Fee	Date	Source
MF	(Poland) Patryk Dziczek	(Poland) Piast Gliwice		1 July 2026	
FW	(Cameroon) Jean-Pierre Nsame	(Poland) Legia Warsaw	Free	1 July 2026	
MF	(North Macedonia) Darko Churlinov	(Turkey) Kocaelispor	Free	27 July 2026	
DF	(Belgium) Lukas Willen	(Belgium) Zulte Waregem	Free	31 July 2026	

=== Out ===
Pos.	Player	Transferred to	Fee	Date	Source
DF	(Hungary) Attila Szalai	(Germany) TSG Hoffenheim	Loan return	30 June 2026	
MF	(England) Sam Greenwood	(England) Bristol City	Undisclosed	1 July 2026	
DF	(Portugal) Marian Huja	(Romania) CFR Cluj	Loan made permanent	1 July 2026	

== Pre-season ==
27 June 2026 Friendly	Berliner FC Dynamo (Germany)	0–3	(Poland) Pogoń Szczecin
16:00			Čuić 40'; Angielski 48', 81'

4 July 2026 Friendly	Zagłębie Lubin (Poland)	2–0	(Poland) Pogoń Szczecin
14:00	9'; 29'

8 July 2026 Friendly	Pogoń Szczecin (Poland)	2–1	(Poland) Chrobry Głogów
14:00

11 July 2026 Friendly	Fenerbahçe (Turkey)	4–0	(Poland) Pogoń Szczecin	Linz, Austria
16:00	Ünder 13'; Musaba 23'; Cherif 48', 52'			Stadium: Donauparkstadion

15 July 2026 Friendly	Sturm Graz (Austria)	1–0	(Poland) Pogoń Szczecin
17:00	Kayombo

== Competitions ==
=== Ekstraklasa ===
Pos	Team	Pld	W	D	L	GF	GA	GD	Pts	Qualification or relegation
2	Górnik Zabrze	3	3	0	0	7	3	+4	9	Qualification for the Champions League second qualifying round
3	Lech Poznań	3	2	1	0	5	1	+4	7	Qualification for the Europa League second qualifying round
4	Pogoń Szczecin	3	2	0	1	5	2	+3	6	Qualification for the Conference League second qualifying round
5	Zagłębie Lubin	3	2	0	1	5	4	+1	6	
6	Wisła Kraków	4	2	0	2	8	8	0	6	

Updated to match(es) played on 16 August 2026. Source: ekstraklasa.org 90minut.pl
Rules for classification: 1) Points; 2) Head-to-head points; 3) Head-to-head goal difference; 4) Goal difference; 5) Goals scored; 6) Number of wins; 7) Number of away wins; 8) Lower number of points based on yellow and red cards (red card = 3 points, yellow card = 1 point, sending-off = 3 points - including 1 point for first yellow card); 9) Fairplay ranking; 10) Draw.
(Note: Head-to-head record is used only after all the matches between the teams in question have been played)

==== Results by round ====
Round	1	2
Ground	H	A
Result	L	
Position		

Updated to match(es) played on August 2024. Source:
A = Away; H = Home; W = Win; D = Draw; L = Loss

==== Matches ====
24 July 2026 1	Pogoń Szczecin	0–1	Legia Warsaw	Szczecin
20:30				Stadium: Florian Krygier Municipal Stadium

3 August 2026 2	Cracovia	v	Pogoń Szczecin	Kraków
19:00				Stadium: Józef Piłsudski Cracovia Stadium
