= Yusuf Kabadayı =

German footballer (born 2004)

Personal information
- Full name: Yusuf Karhan Kabadayı
- Date of birth: 2 February 2004 (age 22)
- Place of birth: Munich, Germany
- Height: 1.86 m (6 ft 1 in)
- Positions: Left winger; forward

Team information
- Current team: Rijeka (on loan from FC Augsburg)
- Number: 7

Youth career
- 2011–2012: Eintracht München
- 2012–2023: Bayern Munich

Senior career*
Years	Team	Apps	(Gls)
2021–2024	Bayern Munich II	39	(13)
2023–2024	Bayern Munich	0	(0)
2023–2024	→ Schalke 04 (loan)	23	(4)
2024	→ Schalke 04 II (loan)	2	(1)
2024–	FC Augsburg	5	(1)
2024–	FC Augsburg II	1	(0)
2025–2026	→ Gaziantep (loan)	17	(1)
2026–	→ Rijeka (loan)	2	(0)

International career^{‡}
2018–2019	Turkey U15	7	(4)
2019	Turkey U16	1	(0)
2021–2022	Germany U18	5	(3)
2022–2023	Germany U19	6	(1)
2023–2024	Germany U20	7	(0)
- * Club domestic league appearances and goals as of 31 August 2026 ‡ National team caps and goals as of 26 March 2024

Yusuf Karhan Kabadayı (born 2 February 2004) is a professional footballer who plays as a left winger or forward for Croatian Football League club Rijeka, on loan from Bundesliga club Augsburg. Born in Germany, he initially represented Turkey on junior international level, before switching allegiance to Germany.

== Club career ==
=== Bayern Munich ===
After playing two seasons for Bayern Munich II, Kabadayı signed a professional two-year contract with Bayern Munich on 3 August 2023.

==== Loan to Schalke 04 ====
He was immediately loaned to Schalke 04 which had been recently relegated to the 2. Bundesliga for the 2023–24 season, with the club having an option to make the move permanent at the end of the season-long loan.

=== FC Augsburg ===
After a season with Schalke 04 on the 2. Bundesliga, Kabadayı returned to Bayern Munich and on 4 July 2024, he was transferred permanently to fellow Bundesliga club FC Augsburg, by signing a contract until 2028 for a €1 million estimated fee.

==== Loan to Gaziantep ====
On 12 September 2025, he moved to Turkey and joined Süper Lig club Gaziantep, on an initial one-year loan with the option to make the move permanent at the end of the 2025–26 season.

== International career ==
Kabadayı represented Turkey at under-15 and under-16 level. At the age of 17 years, he decided to switch to the Germany national youth team, where he played at under-18, under-19 and under-20 level.

== Personal life ==
Born in Munich, Kabadayı is of Turkish descent.

== Career statistics ==
As of match played 6 December 2024

Appearances and goals by club, season and competition
Club	Season	League			Cup		Other		Total	
Club	Season	Division	Apps	Goals	Apps	Goals	Apps	Goals	Apps	Goals
Bayern Munich II	2021–22	Regionalliga Bayern	18	4	—		—		18	4
Bayern Munich II	2022–23	Regionalliga Bayern	21	9	—		—		21	9
Bayern Munich II	Total		39	13	—		—		39	13
Schalke 04 (loan)	2023–24	2. Bundesliga	23	4	1	0	—		24	4
Schalke 04 (loan)	Total		23	4	1	0	—		24	4
Schalke 04 II (loan)	2023–24	Regionalliga West	2	1	—		—		2	1
Schalke 04 II (loan)	Total		2	1	—		—		2	1
FC Augsburg	2024–25	Bundesliga	5	1	1 (Note: Appearance in the DFB-Pokal)	0	—		6	1
FC Augsburg	Total		5	1	1	0	—		6	1
FC Augsburg II	2024–25	Regionalliga Bayern	1	0	—		—		1	0
FC Augsburg II	Total		1	0	—		—		1	0
Career total			70	19	2	0	0	0	72	19
