= 2021–22 FC Schalke 04 season =

Schalke 04
2021–22 season
- Managing board: Bernd Schröder; Peter Knäbel; Christina Rühl-Hamers
- Head coach: Dimitrios Grammozis (until 6 March); Mike Büskens (from 7 March)
- Stadium: Veltins-Arena
- 2. Bundesliga: 1st (promoted)
- DFB-Pokal: Second round
- Top goalscorer: League: Simon Terodde (30); All: Simon Terodde (30)
Home colours	Away colours

The 2021–22 FC Schalke 04 season was the 118th season in the football club's history and their sixth season in the 2. Bundesliga, where they were relegated from the Bundesliga the previous season after spending 30 consecutive seasons in the league. In addition to the domestic league, Schalke 04 participated in this season's edition of the domestic cup, the DFB-Pokal. This was the 21st season for Schalke in the Veltins-Arena, located in Gelsenkirchen, North Rhine-Westphalia. The season covered a period from 1 July 2021 to 30 June 2022.

== Players ==
Note: Players' appearances and goals only in their Schalke career.

As of end of 2021–22 season.

No.	Name	Nat.	Pos.	Age	Contract		League		Total	
No.	Name	Nat.	Pos.	Age	began	ends	Apps	Goals	Apps	Goals
Goalkeepers
1	Ralf Fährmann	(Germany)	GK	33	Jul 2011	Jun 2025	206	0	267	0
30	Martin Fraisl	(Austria)	GK	29	Jul 2021	Jun 2022	26	0	26	0
34	Michael Langer	(Austria)	GK	37	Aug 2017	Jun 2022	5	0	5	0
Defenders
2	Thomas Ouwejan	(Netherlands)	DF	26	Jul 2021	Jun 2022	28	3	30	3
3	Ko Itakura	(Japan)	DF	25	Aug 2021	Jun 2022	31	4	32	4
5	Marius Lode	(Norway)	DF	29	Jan 2022	Jun 2024	6	0	6	0
16	Andreas Vindheim	(Norway)	DF	26	Jan 2022	Jun 2022	7	1	7	1
26	Salif Sané	(Senegal)	DF	31	Jul 2018	Jun 2022	70	4	82	6
33	Malick Thiaw	(Germany)	DF	20	Jul 2020	Jun 2024	54	3	58	3
35	Marcin Kamiński	(Poland)	DF	30	Jul 2021	Jun 2023	31	2	33	2
41	Henning Matriciani	(Germany)	DF	22	Sep 2021	Jun 2024	13	0	13	0
Midfielders
4	Victor Pálsson	(Iceland)	MF	31	Jul 2021	Jun 2023	28	0	30	0
7	Darko Churlinov	(North Macedonia)	MF	21	Aug 2021	Jun 2022	22	2	23	2
8	Danny Latza (captain)	(Germany)	MF	32	Jul 2021	Jun 2023	18	2	19	2
10	Rodrigo Zalazar	(Uruguay)	MF	22	Aug 2021	Jun 2022	30	6	32	7
14	Dong-gyeong Lee	(South Korea)	MF	24	Jan 2022	Jun 2022	1	0	1	0
17	Florian Flick	(Germany)	MF	22	May 2021	Jun 2024	31	1	32	1
18	Marc Rzatkowski	(Germany)	MF	32	Sep 2021	Jun 2022	2	0	2	0
24	Dominick Drexler	(Germany)	MF	32	Jul 2021	Jun 2023	23	3	24	3
27	Reinhold Ranftl	(Austria)	MF	30	Jul 2021	Jun 2024	15	0	16	0
36	Blendi Idrizi	(Kosovo)	MF	24	Jun 2021	Jun 2024	25	2	27	2
38	Mehmet-Can Aydın	(Germany)	MF	20	Jun 2021	Jun 2025	24	1	25	1
39	Yaroslav Mikhaylov	(Russia)	MF	19	Jul 2021	Jun 2022	8	0	10	1
42	Kerim Çalhanoğlu	(Germany)	MF	19	Sep 2020	Jun 2024	14	0	15	0
Forwards
9	Simon Terodde	(Germany)	FW	34	Jul 2021	Jun 2023	30	30	32	30
11	Marius Bülter	(Germany)	FW	29	Jul 2021	Jun 2024	32	10	34	12
21	Marvin Pieringer	(Germany)	FW	22	Jul 2021	Jun 2022	24	2	26	2

== Transfers ==
=== In ===
Player	Nat.	Pos.	From	Type	Window	Ends	Transfer fee	Ref.
Marius Lode	(Norway)	DF	(Norway) Bodø/Glimt	End of contract	Winter	2024	—	
Dong-gyeong Lee	(South Korea)	MF	(South Korea) Ulsan Hyundai	Loan with option to buy	Winter	2022	—	
Andreas Vindheim	(Norway)	DF	(Czech Republic) Sparta Prague	Loan with option to buy	Winter	2022	—	
Marius Bülter	(Germany)	FW	(Germany) Union Berlin	Transfer	Summer	2024	€800,000	
Victor Pálsson	(Iceland)	MF	(Germany) Darmstadt 98	Transfer	Summer	2023	€700,000	
Reinhold Ranftl	(Austria)	MF	(Austria) LASK	Transfer	Summer	2024	€650,000	
Dominick Drexler	(Germany)	MF	(Germany) 1. FC Köln	Transfer	Summer	2023	Free	
Dries Wouters	(Belgium)	DF	(Belgium) Genk	Transfer	Summer	2024	Free	
Martin Fraisl	(Austria)	GK	(Netherlands) ADO Den Haag	End of contract	Summer	2022	—	
Marcin Kamiński	(Poland)	DF	(Germany) VfB Stuttgart	End of contract	Summer	2023	—	
Danny Latza	(Germany)	MF	(Germany) Mainz 05	End of contract	Summer	2023	—	
Marc Rzatkowski	(Germany)	MF	Free agent	End of contract	Summer	2022	—	
Simon Terodde	(Germany)	FW	(Germany) Hamburger SV	End of contract	Summer	2022	—	
Ko Itakura	(Japan)	DF	(England) Manchester City	Loan with option to buy	Summer	2022	—	
Thomas Ouwejan	(Netherlands)	DF	(Netherlands) AZ Alkmaar	Loan with option to buy	Summer	2022	—	
Marvin Pieringer	(Germany)	FW	(Germany) SC Freiburg	Loan with option to buy	Summer	2022	—	
Rodrigo Zalazar	(Uruguay)	MF	(Germany) Eintracht Frankfurt	Loan with option to buy	Summer	2022	—	
Darko Churlinov	(North Macedonia)	MF	(Germany) VfB Stuttgart	Loan	Summer	2022	—	
Yaroslav Mikhaylov	(Russia)	MF	(Russia) Zenit Saint Petersburg	Loan	Summer	2022	—	
Mehmet-Can Aydın	(Germany)	MF	(Germany) Schalke 04 II	Promoted	Summer	2022	—	—
Florian Flick	(Germany)	MF	(Germany) Schalke 04 II	Promoted	Summer	2023	—	
Blendi Idrizi	(Kosovo)	MF	(Germany) Schalke 04 II	Promoted	Summer	2023	—	
Henning Matriciani	(Germany)	DF	(Germany) Schalke 04 II	Promoted	Summer	2024	—	
Jonas Carls	(Germany)	DF	(Portugal) Vitória Guimarães	Loan return	Summer	2022	—	—
Ozan Kabak	(Turkey)	DF	(England) Liverpool	Loan return	Summer	2023	—	—
Ahmed Kutucu	(Turkey)	FW	(Netherlands) Heracles Almelo	Loan return	Summer	2022	—	—
Rabbi Matondo	(Wales)	FW	(England) Stoke City	Loan return	Summer	2023	—	—
Sebastian Rudy	(Germany)	MF	(Germany) 1899 Hoffenheim	Loan return	Summer	2022	—	—
Markus Schubert	(Germany)	GK	(Germany) Eintracht Frankfurt	Loan return	Summer	2023	—	—

=== Out ===
Player	Nat.	Pos.	To	Type	Window	Transfer fee	Ref.
Timo Becker	(Germany)	DF	(Germany) Hansa Rostock	Loan	Winter	—	
Dries Wouters	(Belgium)	DF	(Belgium) Mechelen	Loan	Winter	—	
Weston McKennie	(United States)	MF	(Italy) Juventus	Transfer	Summer	€18,500,000 (Note: Fee may eventually rise to €25,000,000. He was previously loaned for €4,500,000 loan fee for the 2020–21 season)	
Suat Serdar	(Germany)	MF	(Germany) Hertha BSC	Transfer	Summer	€8,000,000	
Matthew Hoppe	(United States)	FW	(Spain) Mallorca	Transfer	Summer	€3,500,000	
Benito Raman	(Belgium)	FW	(Belgium) Anderlecht	Transfer	Summer	€3,500,000	
Bernard Tekpetey	(Ghana)	FW	(Bulgaria) Ludogorets Razgrad	Transfer	Summer	€900,000 (Note: He was previously loaned for €400,000 loan fee for the 2020–21 season)	
Ahmed Kutucu	(Turkey)	FW	(Turkey) İstanbul Başakşehir	Transfer	Summer	€600,000	
Matija Nastasić	(Serbia)	DF	(Italy) Fiorentina	Transfer	Summer	€500,000	
Jonas Carls	(Germany)	DF	(Germany) SC Paderborn	Transfer	Summer	Free	
Markus Schubert	(Germany)	GK	(Netherlands) Vitesse	Transfer	Summer	Free	
Mark Uth	(Germany)	FW	(Germany) 1. FC Köln	Transfer	Summer	Free	
Omar Mascarell	(Spain)	MF	(Spain) Elche	Released	Summer	—	
Sebastian Rudy	(Germany)	MF	(Germany) 1899 Hoffenheim	Released	Summer	—	
Nabil Bentaleb	(Algeria)	MF	Free agent	End of contract	Summer	—	
Klaas-Jan Huntelaar	(Netherlands)	FW	Retired	End of contract	Summer	—	
Shkodran Mustafi	(Germany)	DF	(Spain) Levante	End of contract	Summer	—	
Bastian Oczipka	(Germany)	DF	(Germany) Union Berlin	End of contract	Summer	—	
Alessandro Schöpf	(Austria)	MF	(Germany) Arminia Bielefeld	End of contract	Summer	—	
Steven Skrzybski	(Germany)	FW	(Germany) Holstein Kiel	End of contract	Summer	—	
Benjamin Stambouli	(France)	DF	(Turkey) Adana Demirspor	End of contract	Summer	—	
Ozan Kabak	(Turkey)	DF	(England) Norwich City	Loan with option to buy (Note: €4,000,000 loan fee. Option to buy for €13,000,000 could become an obligation to buy under certain conditions.)	Summer	—	
Can Bozdoğan	(Germany)	MF	(Turkey) Beşiktaş	Loan with option to buy	Summer	—	
Rabbi Matondo	(Wales)	FW	(Belgium) Cercle Brugge	Loan with option to buy	Summer	—	
Levent Mercan	(Germany)	MF	(Turkey) Fatih Karagümrük	Loan with option to buy	Summer	—	
Nassim Boujellab	(Morocco)	MF	(Germany) Ingolstadt 04	Loan	Summer	—	
Amine Harit	(Morocco)	MF	(France) Marseille	Loan	Summer	—	
Hamza Mendyl	(Morocco)	DF	(Turkey) Gaziantep	Loan	Summer	—	
Sead Kolašinac	(Bosnia and Herzegovina)	DF	(England) Arsenal	End of loan	Summer	—	
Kilian Ludewig	(Germany)	DF	(Austria) Red Bull Salzburg	End of loan	Summer	—	
Gonçalo Paciência	(Portugal)	FW	(Germany) Eintracht Frankfurt	End of loan	Summer	—	
Frederik Rønnow	(Denmark)	GK	(Germany) Eintracht Frankfurt	End of loan	Summer	—	
William	(Brazil)	DF	(Germany) VfL Wolfsburg	End of loan	Summer	—	

== Friendly matches ==
Win Draw Loss

23 June 2021 1	Schalke 04 (Germany)	8–0	(Germany) PSV Wesel-Lackhausen	Gelsenkirchen, Germany
18:00 CEST (UTC+2)	Latza 15'; Terodde 25', 35', 38'; Raman 29'; Mendyl 53'; Kutucu 70'; Thiaw 87'	Report		Stadium: Parkstadion; Attendance: 1,000

27 June 2021 2	Schalke 04 (Germany)	14–0	(Germany) Hamborn 07	Gelsenkirchen, Germany
15:00 CEST (UTC+2)	Raman 4'; Sané 10'; Idrizi 15'; Pieringer 35'; Mikhaylov 46', 70'; Becker 48'; Mercan 54'; Terodde 57' (pen.), 63', 78'; Kamiński 73'; Boujellab 87'; Aydın 88'	Report		Stadium: Parkstadion; Attendance: 1,000

3 July 2021 3	Schalke 04 (Germany)	0–0	(Russia) Zenit Saint Petersburg	Kufstein, Austria
16:00 CEST (UTC+2)		Report		Stadium: Kufstein Arena; Attendance: 1,000

9 July 2021 4	Schalke 04 (Germany)	0–0	(Ukraine) Shakhtar Donetsk	Mittersill, Austria
18:00 CEST (UTC+2)		Report		Stadium: Waldstadion; Attendance: 650

16 July 2021 5	Schalke 04 (Germany)	3–2	(Netherlands) Vitesse	Gelsenkirchen, Germany
18:00 CEST (UTC+2)	Terodde 53', 65'; Idrizi 83'	Report	Manhoef 73'; Oroz 88'	Stadium: Parkstadion; Attendance: 1,000

27 July 2021 6	Schalke 04 (Germany)	7–0	(Germany) SSVg Velbert	Gelsenkirchen, Germany
19:00 CEST (UTC+2)	Pieringer 1', 5', 16'; Çalhanoğlu 23'; Harit 27', 43'; Bozdoğan 75'	Report		Stadium: Training ground Attendance: 0

2 September 2021 7	Schalke 04 (Germany)	1–5	(Belgium) Eupen	Gelsenkirchen, Germany
15:00 CEST (UTC+2)	Mikhaylov 49'	Report	Nuhu 10', 29', 37'; Keita 44'; N'Dri 47'	Stadium: Training ground Attendance: 0

7 October 2021 8	VfB Lübeck (Germany)	0–2	(Germany) Schalke 04	Lübeck, Germany
18:00 CEST (UTC+2)		Report	Bülter 37'; Hanraths 85'	Stadium: Stadion Lohmühle; Attendance: 3,003

8 January 2022 9	Schalke 04 (Germany)	1–1	(Netherlands) Fortuna Sittard	Gelsenkirchen, Germany
13:00 CEST (UTC+01:00)	Pieringer 41'	Report	Ferati 52'	Stadium: Parkstadion; Attendance: 0

27 January 2022 10	1. FC Köln (Germany)	2–2	(Germany) Schalke 04	Cologne, Germany
13:00 CEST (UTC+01:00)	Modeste 28'; Andersson 46'	Report	Bülter 10'; Pieringer 73'	Stadium: Franz-Kremer Stadion; Attendance: 0

24 March 2022 11	Schalke 04 (Germany)	1–0	(Netherlands) FC Utrecht	Gelsenkirchen, Germany
14:00 CEST (UTC+02:00)	Drexler 13'	Report		Stadium: Training ground Attendance: 0

== Competitions ==
=== Overview ===
Competition	First match	Last match	Starting round	Final position	Record							
Competition	First match	Last match	Starting round	Final position	Pld	W	D	L	GF	GA	GD	Win %
2. Bundesliga	23 July 2021	15 May 2022	Matchday 1	Winners	34	20	5	9	72	44	+28	58.82
DFB-Pokal	8 August 2021	26 October 2021	First round	Second round	2	1	0	1	4	2	+2	50.00
Total					36	21	5	10	76	46	+30	58.33

Last updated: 16 May 2022
Source: Soccerway

=== 2. Bundesliga ===
==== League table ====
Pos	Team	Pld	W	D	L	GF	GA	GD	Pts	Promotion, qualification or relegation
1	Schalke 04 (C, P)	34	20	5	9	72	44	+28	65	Promotion to Bundesliga
2	Werder Bremen (P)	34	18	9	7	65	43	+22	63	Promotion to Bundesliga
3	Hamburger SV	34	16	12	6	67	35	+32	60	Qualification for promotion play-offs
4	Darmstadt 98	34	18	6	10	71	46	+25	60	
5	FC St. Pauli	34	16	9	9	61	46	+15	57	

Source: DFB
Rules for classification: 1) Points; 2) Goal difference; 3) Goals scored; 4) Head-to-head points; 5) Head-to-head goal difference; 6) Head-to-head away goals scored; 7) Away goals scored; 8) Play-off.
(C) Champions; (P) Promoted

==== Results summary ====
Overall								Home						Away					
Pld	W	D	L	GF	GA	GD	Pts	W	D	L	GF	GA	GD	W	D	L	GF	GA	GD
34	20	5	9	72	44	+28	65	10	2	5	40	27	+13	10	3	4	32	17	+15

Source: Soccerway

==== Results by round ====
Round	1	2	3	4	5	6	7	8	9	10	11	12	13	14	15	16	17	18	19	20	21	22	23	24	25	26	27	28	29	30	31	32	33	34
Ground	H	A	H	A	H	A	H	A	H	A	H	A	H	A	H	A	H	A	H	A	H	A	H	A	H	A	H	A	H	A	H	A	H	A
Result	L	W	D	L	W	W	L	W	W	W	W	L	L	D	W	L	W	D	D	W	W	L	W	D	L	W	W	W	W	W	L	W	W	W
Position	13	8	9	13	9	7	11	8	4	3	3	3	5	7	6	8	4	4	6	4	5	5	5	5	6	5	4	4	1	1	2	1	1	1
Points	0	3	4	4	7	10	10	13	16	19	22	22	22	23	26	26	29	30	31	34	37	37	40	41	41	44	47	50	53	56	56	59	62	65

Updated to match(es) played on 15 May 2022. Source: DFB
A = Away; H = Home; W = Win; D = Draw; L = Loss

==== Matches ====
The league fixtures were announced on 25 June 2021.

23 July 2021 1	Schalke 04	1–3	Hamburger SV	Gelsenkirchen
20:30 CEST (UTC+02:00)	Terodde 7'	Report	Glatzel 53'; Heyer 86'; Jatta 90'	Stadium: Veltins-Arena; Attendance: 19,770

1 August 2021 2	Holstein Kiel	0–3	Schalke 04	Kiel
13:30 CEST (UTC+02:00)		Report	Terodde 2', 21'; Bülter 68'	Stadium: Holstein-Stadion; Attendance: 4,100

13 August 2021 3	Schalke 04	1–1	Erzgebirge Aue	Gelsenkirchen
18:30 CEST (UTC+02:00)	Drexler 32'	Report	Härtel 86'	Stadium: Veltins-Arena; Attendance: 20,126

21 August 2021 4	Jahn Regensburg	4–1	Schalke 04	Regensburg
13:30 CEST (UTC+02:00)	Beste 8'; Breitkreuz 55'; Otto 73'; Singh 86'	Report	Terodde 81'	Stadium: Jahnstadion; Attendance: 5,324

28 August 2021 5	Schalke 04	3–1	Fortuna Düsseldorf	Gelsenkirchen
20:30 CEST (UTC+02:00)	Bülter 15'; Terodde 46', 90'	Report	Appelkamp 12'	Stadium: Veltins-Arena; Attendance: 25,000

12 September 2021 6	SC Paderborn	0–1	Schalke 04	Paderborn
13:30 CEST (UTC+02:00)		Report	Terodde 63'	Stadium: Benteler-Arena; Attendance: 8,500

17 September 2021 7	Schalke 04	1–2	Karlsruher SC	Gelsenkirchen
18:30 CEST (UTC+02:00)	Terodde 15'	Report	Choi 1'; Wanitzek 88'	Stadium: Veltins-Arena; Attendance: 25,000

25 September 2021 8	Hansa Rostock	0–2	Schalke 04	Rostock
20:30 CEST (UTC+02:00)		Report	Terodde 42', 49'	Stadium: Ostseestadion; Attendance: 14,500

3 October 2021 9	Schalke 04	3–0	Ingolstadt 04	Gelsenkirchen
13:30 CEST (UTC+02:00)	Bülter 25'; Aydın 65'; Terodde 77'	Report		Stadium: Veltins-Arena; Attendance: 26,546

15 October 2021 10	Hannover 96	0–1	Schalke 04	Hannover
18:30 CEST (UTC+02:00)		Report	Kamiński 90+5'	Stadium: HDI-Arena; Attendance: 39,500

23 October 2021 11	Schalke 04	3–0	Dynamo Dresden	Gelsenkirchen
20:30 CEST (UTC+02:00)	Ouwejan 20'; Bülter 78'; Kamiński 90+4'	Report		Stadium: Veltins-Arena; Attendance: 54,526

29 October 2021 12	1. FC Heidenheim	1–0	Schalke 04	Heidenheim
18:30 CEST (UTC+02:00)	Husing 89'	Report		Stadium: Voith-Arena; Attendance: 10,000

7 November 2021 13	Schalke 04	2–4	Darmstadt 98	Gelsenkirchen
13:30 CEST (UTC+01:00)	Pfeiffer 8' (o.g.); Pieringer 88'	Report	Tietz 11', 63'; Honsak 23'; Goller 89'	Stadium: Veltins-Arena; Attendance: 51,327

20 November 2021 14	Werder Bremen	1–1	Schalke 04	Bremen
20:30 CEST (UTC+01:00)	Füllkrug 90+9' (pen.)	Report	Terodde 82'	Stadium: Weser-Stadion; Attendance: 42,000

27 November 2021 15	Schalke 04	5–2	SV Sandhausen	Gelsenkirchen
13:30 CEST (UTC+01:00)	Ouwejan 58'; Bülter 64', 76'; Zhirov 72' (o.g.); Zalazar 82'	Report	Ritzmaier 47'; Testroet 74'	Stadium: Veltins-Arena; Attendance: 46,319

4 December 2021 16	FC St. Pauli	2–1	Schalke 04	Hamburg
20:30 CEST (UTC+01:00)	Burgstaller 20', 39'	Report	Zalazar 75'	Stadium: Millerntor-Stadion; Attendance: 19,950

10 December 2021 17	Schalke 04	4–1	1. FC Nürnberg	Gelsenkirchen
18:30 CEST (UTC+01:00)	Ouwejan 20'; Schäffler 66' (o.g.); Churlinov 85'; Itakura 90+4'	Report	Nürnberger 49'	Stadium: Veltins-Arena; Attendance: 15,000

18 December 2021 18	Hamburger SV	1–1	Schalke 04	Hamburg
20:30 CEST (UTC+01:00)	Glatzel 2'	Report	Itakura 87'	Stadium: Volksparkstadion; Attendance: 15,000

16 January 2022 19	Schalke 04	1–1	Holstein Kiel	Gelsenkirchen
13:30 CEST (UTC+01:00)	Terodde 73'	Report	Mühling 67'	Stadium: Veltins-Arena; Attendance: 750

22 January 2022 20	Erzgebirge Aue	0–5	Schalke 04	Aue
20:30 CEST (UTC+01:00)		Report	Terodde 36'; Vindheim 38'; Latza 51', 63'; Pieringer 72'	Stadium: Erzgebirgsstadion; Attendance: 1,000

5 February 2022 21	Schalke 04	2–1	Jahn Regensburg	Gelsenkirchen
13:30 CEST (UTC+01:00)	Terodde 63'; Thiaw 73'	Report	Albers 32'	Stadium: Veltins-Arena; Attendance: 10,000

13 February 2022 22	Fortuna Düsseldorf	2–1	Schalke 04	Düsseldorf
13:30 CEST (UTC+01:00)	Narey 47'; Hennings 56'	Report	Idrizi 42'	Stadium: Merkur Spiel-Arena; Attendance: 10,000

18 February 2022 23	Schalke 04	2–0	SC Paderborn	Gelsenkirchen
18:30 CEST (UTC+01:00)	Bülter 22'; Churlinov 74'	Report		Stadium: Veltins-Arena; Attendance: 10,000

26 February 2022 24	Karlsruher SC	1–1	Schalke 04	Karlsruhe
13:30 CEST (UTC+01:00)	Choi 34'	Report	Terodde 27'	Stadium: Wildparkstadion; Attendance: 15,000

5 March 2022 25	Schalke 04	3–4	Hansa Rostock	Gelsenkirchen
13:30 CEST (UTC+01:00)	Terodde 33', 43', 83'	Report	Ingelsson 25'; Verhoek 40'; Breier 56'; Fröling 90+5'	Stadium: Veltins-Arena; Attendance: 28,790

13 March 2022 26	Ingolstadt 04	0–3	Schalke 04	Ingolstadt
13:30 CEST (UTC+01:00)		Report	Zalazar 55'; Thiaw 71'; Drexler 81'	Stadium: Audi Sportpark; Attendance: 7,593

19 March 2022 27	Schalke 04	2–1	Hannover 96	Gelsenkirchen
13:30 CEST (UTC+01:00)	Itakura 43'; Zalazar 54'	Report	Teuchert 50'	Stadium: Veltins-Arena; Attendance: 55,152

1 April 2022 28	Dynamo Dresden	1–2	Schalke 04	Dresden
18:30 CEST (UTC+02:00)	Will 70'	Report	Terodde 45' (pen.), 51'	Stadium: Rudolf-Harbig-Stadion; Attendance: 30,273

9 April 2022 29	Schalke 04	3–0	1. FC Heidenheim	Gelsenkirchen
13:30 CEST (UTC+02:00)	Drexler 35'; Itakura 52'; Terodde 90+6'	Report		Stadium: Veltins-Arena; Attendance: 57,126

17 April 2022 30	Darmstadt 98	2–5	Schalke 04	Darmstadt
13:30 CEST (UTC+02:00)	Tietz 11', 34'	Report	Terodde 14', 29'; Bülter 42', 48', 62'	Stadium: Merck-Stadion am Böllenfalltor; Attendance: 14,500

23 April 2022 31	Schalke 04	1–4	Werder Bremen	Gelsenkirchen
13:30 CEST (UTC+02:00)	Terodde 88'	Report	Gruev 9'; Füllkrug 26'; Ducksch 51', 53'	Stadium: Veltins-Arena; Attendance: 62,271

29 April 2022 32	SV Sandhausen	1–2	Schalke 04	Sandhausen
18:30 CEST (UTC+02:00)	Diekmeier 83'	Report	Terodde 71', 90+1'	Stadium: BWT-Stadion am Hardtwald; Attendance: 12,355

7 May 2022 33	Schalke 04	3–2	FC St. Pauli	Gelsenkirchen
20:30 CEST (UTC+02:00)	Terodde 47' (pen.), 71'; Zalazar 78'	Report	Matanovic 9', 17'	Stadium: Veltins-Arena; Attendance: 62,271

15 May 2022 34	1. FC Nürnberg	1–2	Schalke 04	Nuremberg
15:30 CEST (UTC+02:00)	Schleimer 86'	Report	Zalazar 15'; Terodde 88'	Stadium: Max-Morlock-Stadion; Attendance: 50,000

=== DFB-Pokal ===
8 August 2021 First round	FC Villingen	1–4	Schalke 04	Villingen-Schwenningen
15:30 CEST (UTC+02:00)	Plavci 31'	Report	Bülter 17', 51'; Zalazar 49'; Mikhaylov 79'	Stadium: MS-Technologie-Arena; Attendance: 4,992

26 October 2021 Second round	1860 Munich	1–0	Schalke 04	Munich
18:30 CEST (UTC+02:00)	Lex 5'	Report		Stadium: Grünwalder Stadion; Attendance: 15,000

== Statistics ==
As of end of 2021–22 season.

=== Squad statistics ===
No.	Player	Nat.	Pos.	Total					2. Bundesliga					DFB-Pokal				
No.	Player	Nat.	Pos.	Apps	St.	Goal	Booked	Sent off (straight red)	Apps	St.	Goal	Booked	Sent off (straight red)	Apps	St.	Goal	Booked	Sent off (straight red)
1	Ralf Fährmann	(Germany)	GK	8	8	0	0	0	6	6	0	0	0	2	2	0	0	0
30	Martin Fraisl	(Austria)	GK	26	26	0	3	0	26	26	0	3	0	0	0	0	0	0
34	Michael Langer	(Austria)	GK	2	2	0	0	0	2	2	0	0	0	0	0	0	0	0
2	Thomas Ouwejan	(Netherlands)	DF	30	28	3	1	0	28	27	3	1	0	2	1	0	0	0
3	Ko Itakura	(Japan)	DF	32	31	4	3	0	31	30	4	3	0	1	1	0	0	0
5	Marius Lode	(Norway)	DF	6	2	0	0	0	6	2	0	0	0	0	0	0	0	0
16	Andreas Vindheim	(Norway)	DF	7	5	1	3	0	7	5	1	3	0	0	0	0	0	0
26	Salif Sané	(Senegal)	DF	11	6	0	1	0	11	6	0	1	0	0	0	0	0	0
33	Malick Thiaw	(Germany)	DF	32	29	2	3	1	31	28	2	3	0	1	1	0	0	1
35	Marcin Kamiński	(Poland)	DF	33	33	2	6	0	31	31	2	6	0	2	2	0	0	0
41	Henning Matriciani	(Germany)	DF	12	3	0	1	0	12	3	0	1	0	0	0	0	0	0
~~15~~	Dries Wouters (Note: Player transferred out during the season)	(Belgium)	DF	3	2	0	0	0	2	1	0	0	0	1	1	0	0	0
~~31~~	Timo Becker	(Germany)	DF	6	0	0	0	0	5	0	0	0	0	1	0	0	0	0
4	Victor Pálsson	(Iceland)	MF	30	23	0	3	1	28	21	0	3	1	2	2	0	0	0
7	Darko Churlinov	(North Macedonia)	MF	23	14	2	4	0	22	13	2	4	0	1	1	0	0	0
8	Danny Latza	(Germany)	MF	16	9	2	5	0	15	9	2	5	0	1	0	0	0	0
10	Rodrigo Zalazar	(Uruguay)	MF	32	27	7	5	0	30	25	6	4	0	2	2	1	1	0
14	Dong-gyeong Lee	(South Korea)	MF	1	0	0	0	0	1	0	0	0	0	0	0	0	0	0
17	Florian Flick	(Germany)	MF	28	16	0	4	0	27	15	0	4	0	1	1	0	0	0
18	Marc Rzatkowski	(Germany)	MF	2	0	0	0	0	2	0	0	0	0	0	0	0	0	0
24	Dominick Drexler	(Germany)	MF	24	21	3	5	0	23	20	3	5	0	1	1	0	0	0
27	Reinhold Ranftl	(Austria)	MF	16	11	0	2	0	15	10	0	2	0	1	1	0	0	0
36	Blendi Idrizi	(Kosovo)	MF	24	9	1	3	0	22	9	1	3	0	2	0	0	0	0
38	Mehmet-Can Aydın	(Germany)	MF	19	9	1	2	0	18	8	1	2	0	1	1	0	0	0
39	Yaroslav Mikhaylov	(Russia)	MF	10	5	1	1	0	8	4	0	1	0	2	1	1	0	0
42	Kerim Çalhanoğlu	(Germany)	MF	11	7	0	2	0	10	7	0	2	0	1	0	0	0	0
9	Simon Terodde	(Germany)	FW	32	31	30	4	0	30	30	30	3	0	2	1	0	1	0
11	Marius Bülter	(Germany)	FW	34	30	12	2	0	32	28	10	2	0	2	2	2	0	0
21	Marvin Pieringer	(Germany)	FW	26	8	2	5	0	24	7	2	5	0	2	1	0	0	0
40	Keke Topp (Note: Player from Schalke 04 U19)	(Germany)	FW	1	0	0	0	0	1	0	0	0	0	0	0	0	0	0
43	Rufat Dadashov (Note: Player from Schalke 04 II)	(Azerbaijan)	FW	2	1	0	0	0	2	1	0	0	0	0	0	0	0	0
44	Bleron Krasniqi	(Kosovo)	FW	1	0	0	0	0	1	0	0	0	0	0	0	0	0	0
~~43~~	Matthew Hoppe	(United States)	FW	1	0	0	0	0	1	0	0	0	0	0	0	0	0	0
Total				36		73	68	2	34		69	66	1	2		4	2	1

=== Goalscorers ===
Rank	Player	Nat.	Pos.	2. Liga	DFB-Pokal	Total
1	Simon Terodde	(Germany)	FW	30	0	30
2	Marius Bülter	(Germany)	FW	10	2	12
3	Rodrigo Zalazar	(Uruguay)	MF	6	1	7
4	Ko Itakura	(Japan)	DF	4	0	4
5	Dominick Drexler	(Germany)	MF	3	0	3
5	Thomas Ouwejan	(Netherlands)	DF	3	0	3
7	Darko Churlinov	(North Macedonia)	MF	2	0	2
7	Marcin Kamiński	(Poland)	DF	2	0	2
7	Danny Latza	(Germany)	MF	2	0	2
7	Marvin Pieringer	(Germany)	FW	2	0	2
7	Malick Thiaw	(Germany)	DF	2	0	2
12	Mehmet-Can Aydın	(Germany)	MF	1	0	1
12	Blendi Idrizi	(Kosovo)	MF	1	0	1
12	Andreas Vindheim	(Norway)	DF	1	0	1
12	Yaroslav Mikhaylov	(Russia)	MF	0	1	1
Own goals				3	0	3
Total				72	4	76

=== Clean sheets ===
Rank	Player	Nat.	2. Liga	DFB-Pokal	Total
1	Martin Fraisl	(Austria)	8	0	8
2	Ralf Fährmann	(Germany)	1	0	1
2	Michael Langer	(Austria)	1	0	1
Total			10	0	10
