= Niklas Castelle =

German footballer (born 2002)

Personal information
- Date of birth: 27 August 2002 (age 24)
- Place of birth: Senden, Germany
- Height: 1.82 m (6 ft 0 in)
- Position: Forward

Team information
- Current team: Viktoria Köln
- Number: 44

Youth career
- –2020: VfL Senden

Senior career*
Years	Team	Apps	(Gls)
2020–2022	VfL Senden		
2022–2024	Schalke 04 II	63	(16)
2024	Schalke 04	1	(0)
2024–2026	SSV Ulm	5	(0)
2025	→ Alemannia Aachen (loan)	17	(2)
2025–2026	→ Alemannia Aachen (loan)	26	(2)
2026–	Viktoria Köln	0	(0)
- * Club domestic league appearances and goals as of 28 May 2026

Niklas Castelle (born 27 August 2002) is a German footballer who plays as a forward for 3. Liga club Viktoria Köln.

== Career ==
Castelle made his first team debut for Schalke 04 in the 2. Bundesliga in a 2–0 defeat against Hamburger SV on 20 January 2024, coming on as a substitute in the 85th minute for Paul Seguin.

On 24 June 2024, he signed a three-year contract with SSV Ulm, which promoted to the 2. Bundesliga. On 3 January 2025, he moved on loan to 3. Liga club Alemannia Aachen until the end of the season. After returning to Ulm and making an appearance in their 2025–26 3. Liga season opener, on 26 August 2025 he returned to Alemannia Aachen on a new loan.

== Career statistics ==
As of 24 June 2024

Appearances and goals by club, season and competition
Club	Season	League			Cup		Total	
Club	Season	Division	Apps	Goals	Apps	Goals	Apps	Goals
Schalke 04 II	2021–22	Regionalliga West	17	5	—		17	5
Schalke 04 II	2022–23	Regionalliga West	29	4	—		29	4
Schalke 04 II	2023–24	Regionalliga West	17	7	—		17	7
Schalke 04 II	Total		63	16	—		63	16
Schalke 04	2023–24	2. Bundesliga	1	0	0	0	1	0
SSV Ulm	2024–25	2. Bundesliga	0	0	0	0	1	0
Career total			64	16	0	0	64	16
