= Blendi Idrizi =

Kosovan footballer (born 1998)

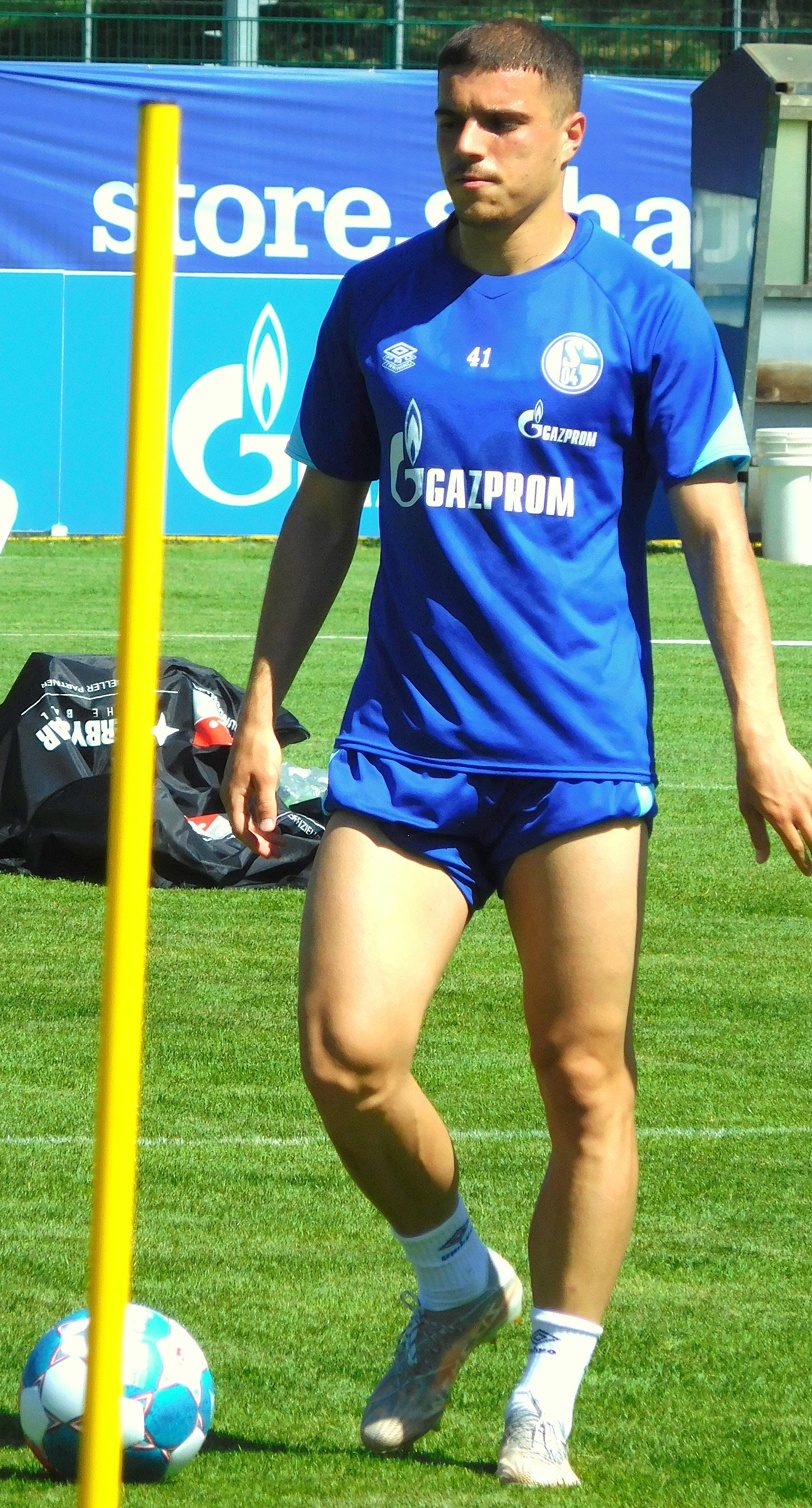
- Idrizi with Schalke 04 in 2021

Personal information
- Date of birth: 2 May 1998 (age 28)
- Place of birth: Bonn, Germany
- Height: 1.76 m (5 ft 9 in)
- Position: Attacking midfielder

Youth career
- 2011–2012: Blau-Weiß Friesdorf
- 2012–2014: Bonner SC
- 2014–2015: TSC Euskirchen
- 2015–2017: 1. FC Köln

Senior career*
Years	Team	Apps	(Gls)
2017–2018	Blau-Weiß Friesdorf	25	(16)
2018–2019	Alemannia Aachen	28	(4)
2019–2020	Fortuna Köln	13	(1)
2020–2023	Schalke 04 II	39	(9)
2021–2024	Schalke 04	41	(3)
2022–2023	→ Jahn Regensburg (loan)	18	(0)
2025–2026	SCR Altach	2	(0)

International career^{‡}
2019–2020	Kosovo U21	3	(0)
2021–2024	Kosovo	9	(0)
- * Club domestic league appearances and goals as of 10 June 2026 ‡ National team caps and goals as of 5 June 2024

Blendi Idrizi (born 2 May 1998) is a Kosovan professional footballer who plays as a attacking midfielder. Born in Germany, he plays for the Kosovo national team.

== Club career ==
=== Early career and return to Blau-Weiß Friesdorf ===
Idrizi at the age of 13 started playing football in Blau-Weiß Friesdorf, where after one year it was transferred to Bonner SC. He besides being was part of Bonner SC, he was part even of TSC Euskirchen (2014–2015) and 1. FC Köln (2015–2017). In the 2017–18 season, Idrizi returns to his former team, Blau-Weiß Friesdorf, but now as a senior team's player and scores 16 goals in 25 games.

=== Alemannia Aachen ===
On 14 May 2018, Idrizi joined Regionalliga West side Alemannia Aachen. On 29 July 2018, he made his debut in a 2–1 away defeat against Viktoria Köln after coming on as a substitute at 58th minute in place of Mahmut Temür.

=== Fortuna Köln ===
On 25 June 2019, Idrizi joined Regionalliga West side Fortuna Köln. On 10 August 2019, he made his debut in a 1–1 home draw against Wattenscheid 09 after being named in the starting line-up.

=== Schalke 04 ===
On 29 January 2020, Idrizi joined Regionalliga West side Schalke 04 II. Three days later, he made his debut in a 2–0 home win against his former club Bonner SC after coming on as a substitute in the 74th minute in place of Jason Ceka.

On 12 May 2021, Idrizi made his first team debut in a 2–1 away defeat against Hertha BSC, starting the match before being substituted off in the 77th minute for Steven Skrzybski. Three days after debut, he scored his first goal for Schalke 04 in his second appearance for the club in a 4–3 home win over Eintracht Frankfurt in Bundesliga.

==== Loan to Jahn Regensburg ====
On 30 August 2022, Idrizi joined 2. Bundesliga side Jahn Regensburg, on a season-long loan.

=== SCR Altach ===
On 1 October 2025, Idrizi joined Austrian Bundesliga side SCR Altach, on a one-year contract with an option for a further year, and was viewed as a replacement for his injured compatriot Vesel Demaku as the club's second-choice player.

== International career ==
=== Under-21 ===
On 22 May 2017, Idrizi received a call-up from Kosovo U21 for a three-day training camp. On 9 October 2019, he received again a call-up from Kosovo U21 for the 2021 UEFA European Under-21 Championship qualification match against Albania U21, and made his debut after coming on as a substitute in the 88th minute in place of Gezim Pepsi.

=== Senior ===
On 25 May 2021, Idrizi received a call-up from Kosovo for the friendly matches against San Marino and Malta. Seven days later, he made his debut with Kosovo in a friendly match against San Marino after being named in the starting line-up.

== Personal life ==
Idrizi was born in Bonn, Germany to Kosovo Albanian parents from Gjilan.

== Career statistics ==
=== Club ===
As of 22 May 2024

Appearances and goals by club, season and competition
Club	Season	League			Cup		Other		Total	
Club	Season	Division	Apps	Goals	Apps	Goals	Apps	Goals	Apps	Goals
Blau-Weiß Friesdorf	2017–18	Oberliga Mittelrhein	25	16	—		1 (Note: Appearance(s) in Mittelrheinpokal)	0	26	16
Alemannia Aachen	2018–19	Regionalliga West	28	4	—		5	2	33	6
Fortuna Köln	2019–20	Regionalliga West	13	1	—		1	0	14	1
Schalke 04 II	2019–20	Regionalliga West	5	2	—		—		5	2
Schalke 04 II	2020–21	Regionalliga West	31	6	—		—		31	6
Schalke 04 II	2023–24	Regionalliga West	3	1	—		—		3	1
Schalke 04 II	Total		39	9	—		—		39	9
Schalke 04	2020–21	Bundesliga	3	1	0	0	—		3	1
Schalke 04	2021–22	2. Bundesliga	22	1	2	0	—		24	1
Schalke 04	2023–24	2. Bundesliga	16	1	0	0	—		16	1
Schalke 04	Total		41	3	2	0	—		43	3
Jahn Regensburg (loan)	2022–23	2. Bundesliga	18	0	1	0	—		19	0
Career total			164	33	3	0	7	2	174	35

=== International ===
As of match played 5 June 2024

Appearances and goals by national team and year
National team	Year	Apps	Goals
Kosovo	2021	3	0
Kosovo	2022	3	0
Kosovo	2023	0	0
Kosovo	2024	3	0
Total		9	0

== Honours ==
Schalke 04

- 2. Bundesliga: 2021–22
