= Mehmet-Can Aydın =

German footballer (born 2002)

Personal information
- Date of birth: 9 February 2002 (age 24)
- Place of birth: Würselen, Germany
- Height: 1.80 m (5 ft 11 in)
- Positions: Right midfielder; right-back

Team information
- Current team: Eintracht Braunschweig
- Number: 8

Youth career
- 2009–2010: VfL Boscheln
- 2010: Alemannia Aachen
- 2010–2014: Borussia Mönchengladbach
- 2014–2020: Schalke 04

Senior career*
Years	Team	Apps	(Gls)
2021–2022	Schalke 04 II	9	(0)
2021–2025	Schalke 04	69	(1)
2023–2024	→ Trabzonspor (loan)	20	(0)
2025–	Eintracht Braunschweig	32	(5)

International career
2017	Germany U15	2	(1)
2017–2018	Germany U16	8	(0)
2018–2019	Germany U17	13	(0)
2020	Germany U19	2	(1)
2021–2022	Germany U20	4	(0)
- * Club domestic league appearances and goals as of 18 May 2026

Mehmet-Can Aydın (born 9 February 2002) is a German professional footballer who plays as a right midfielder or right-back for 2. Bundesliga club Eintracht Braunschweig.

== Club career ==
Aydın made his professional debut for Schalke 04 in the Bundesliga on 3 April 2021, starting against Bayer Leverkusen. He was substituted out in the 74th minute for Alessandro Schöpf, with the away match finishing as a 2–1 loss. In January 2022, he extended his contract with Schalke until 2025.

On 1 August 2023, he agreed to join Süper Lig club Trabzonspor on a season-long loan with an option to make the move permanent.

On 2 July 2025, Aydın signed a two-year contract with Eintracht Braunschweig.

== International career ==
Aydın played several matches for the Germany U-15, U-16, U-17, U-19 and U-20 national teams.

In March 2023, he was named to the Turkey national team by coach Stefan Kuntz for the upcoming UEFA Euro 2024 qualifying matches against Armenia and Croatia, but did not play.

== Personal life ==
Aydın was born in Würselen, North Rhine-Westphalia, and is of Turkish descent.

== Career statistics ==
As of match played 18 May 2025

Appearances and goals by club, season and competition
Club	Season	League			Cup		Total	
Club	Season	Division	Apps	Goals	Apps	Goals	Apps	Goals
Schalke 04 II	2020–21	Regionalliga West	5	0	—		5	0
Schalke 04 II	2022–23	Regionalliga West	4	0	—		4	0
Schalke 04 II	Total		9	0	—		9	0
Schalke 04	2020–21	Bundesliga	6	0	0	0	6	0
Schalke 04	2021–22	2. Bundesliga	18	1	1	0	19	1
Schalke 04	2022–23	Bundesliga	16	0	2	0	18	0
Schalke 04	2024–25	2. Bundesliga	29	0	2	0	31	0
Schalke 04	Total		69	1	5	0	74	1
Trabzonspor (loan)	2023–24	Süper Lig	20	0	3	0	23	0
Career total			98	1	8	0	106	1

== Honours ==
Schalke 04

- 2. Bundesliga: 2021–22
