= Marco Mannhardt =

German footballer (born 2002)

Personal information
- Date of birth: 4 July 2002 (age 24)
- Place of birth: Trostberg, Germany
- Height: 1.83 m (6 ft 0 in)
- Position: Defensive midfielder

Youth career
- –2016: Wacker Burghausen
- 2016–2017: Bayern Munich
- 2017–2021: 1860 Munich

Senior career*
Years	Team	Apps	(Gls)
2020–2023	1860 Munich	3	(0)
2020–2023	1860 Munich II	24	(6)
2023–2024	FV Illertissen	37	(8)
2024–2026	SC Verl	8	(0)
2024–2025	→ FV Illertissen (loan)	16	(5)
- * Club domestic league appearances and goals as of 8 October 2025

Marco Mannhardt (born 4 July 2002) is a German professional footballer who plays as a defensive midfielder.

== Career ==
=== 1860 Munich ===
Mannhardt began his youth career with Wacker Burghausen and Bayern Munich, before joining the academy of 1860 Munich in December 2017. He signed his first professional contract with 1860 Munich in November 2020. On 26 February 2021, he made his professional debut for the club in the 3. Liga, coming on as a substitute in the second minute of second-half stoppage time for Sascha Mölders against SpVgg Unterhaching. The home match finished as a 3–1 win for 1860 Munich. After making his first appearance of the 2021–22 season in a 3–0 defeat to Waldhof Mannheim in March 2022, Mannhardt suffered a foot injury that ruled him out for several months.

=== FV Illertissen ===
On 1 January 2023, it was announced that Mannhardt had signed for Regionalliga Bayern club FV Illertissen.

=== SC Verl ===
On 4 January 2024, Mannhardt signed with SC Verl in 3. Liga. On 27 August 2024, he was loaned back to FV Illertissen.
