= 2021–22 SpVgg Greuther Fürth season =

SpVgg Greuther Fürth
2021–22 season
- Chairman: Fred Höfler
- Manager: Stefan Leitl
- Stadium: Sportpark Ronhof
- Bundesliga: 18th (relegated)
- DFB-Pokal: First round
- Top goalscorer: League: Branimir Hrgota (9); All: Branimir Hrgota (10)
Home colours	Away colours	Third colours

The 2021–22 season was the 119th season in the existence of SpVgg Greuther Fürth and the club's first season back in the top flight of German football. In addition to the domestic league, Greuther Fürth participated in this season's edition of the DFB-Pokal.

== Players ==
=== First-team squad ===
As of 1 February 2022

Note: Flags indicate national team as defined under FIFA eligibility rules; some limited exceptions apply. Players may hold more than one non-FIFA nationality.

No.	Pos.	Nation	Player
1	GK	GER	Marius Funk
2	DF	GER	Simon Asta
4	DF	GER	Maximilian Bauer
7	FW	GER	Robin Kehr
9	FW	ANG	Afimico Pululu
10	FW	SWE	Branimir Hrgota (captain)
11	FW	NGR	Dickson Abiama
13	MF	GER	Max Christiansen
15	DF	NED	Jetro Willems
16	FW	NOR	Håvard Nielsen
17	FW	GER	Jessic Ngankam (on loan from Hertha BSC)
18	DF	GER	Marco Meyerhöfer
20	MF	GER	Tobias Raschl
21	MF	GER	Timothy Tillman

No.	Pos.	Nation	Player
22	MF	GER	Sebastian Griesbeck
23	DF	GER	Gideon Jung
24	DF	NED	Nick Viergever
25	GK	GER	Leon Schaffran
26	GK	SWE	Andreas Linde
27	DF	GER	Gian-Luca Itter (on loan from SC Freiburg)
28	MF	TUN	Jeremy Dudziak
30	GK	GER	Sascha Burchert (vice-captain)
32	DF	FRA	Abdourahmane Barry
33	MF	GER	Paul Seguin
37	MF	USA	Julian Green
40	FW	GER	Jamie Leweling
41	GK	FIN	Lasse Schulz

=== Out on loan ===
Note: Flags indicate national team as defined under FIFA eligibility rules; some limited exceptions apply. Players may hold more than one non-FIFA nationality.

No.	Pos.	Nation	Player
—	MF	GER	Nils Seufert (at SV Sandhausen until 30 June 2022)

== Transfers ==
=== In ===
No.	Pos	Player	Transferred from	Fee	Date	Source
8	MF	(Germany) Nils Seufert	(Germany) Arminia Bielefeld	Free	1 July 2021	
13	MF	(Germany) Max Christiansen	(Germany) Waldhof Mannheim	Free	1 July 2021	
23	DF	(Germany) Gideon Jung	(Germany) Hamburger SV	Free	1 July 2021	
17	FW	(Germany) Jessic Ngankam	(Germany) Hertha BSC	Loan	8 July 2021	
6	MF	(Germany) Adrian Fein	(Germany) Bayern Munich	Loan	14 July 2021	
5	DF	(Netherlands) Justin Hoogma	(Germany) 1899 Hoffenheim	Loan	15 July 2021	
28	MF	(Tunisia) Jeremy Dudziak	(Germany) Hamburger SV	€750,000	16 August 2021	
15	DF	(Netherlands) Jetro Willems	(Germany) Eintracht Frankfurt	Free	25 August 2021	
19	FW	(Switzerland) Cedric Itten	(Scotland) Rangers	Loan	31 August 2021	
22	MF	(Germany) Sebastian Griesbeck	(Germany) Union Berlin	€250,000	31 August 2021	
24	DF	(Netherlands) Nick Viergever	(Netherlands) PSV	€300,000	31 August 2021	
9	FW	(Angola) Afimico Pululu	(Switzerland) FC Basel	Undisclosed	7 January 2022	
26	GK	(Sweden) Andreas Linde	(Norway) Molde FK	Free	10 January 2022	
20	MF	(Germany) Tobias Raschl	(Germany) Borussia Dortmund	Undisclosed	31 January 2022	

=== Out ===
No.	Pos	Player	Transferred to	Fee	Date	Source
5	DF	(Albania) Mërgim Mavraj		Free	1 July 2021	
8	MF	(Bosnia and Herzegovina) Marijan Ćavar		Free	1 July 2021	
15	MF	(Germany) Sebastian Ernst	(Germany) Hannover 96	Free	1 July 2021	
22	MF	(Germany) David Raum	(Germany) 1899 Hoffenheim	Free	1 July 2021	
23	DF	(Germany) Paul Jaeckel	(Germany) Union Berlin	Free	1 July 2021	
36	DF	(Germany) Alexander Lungwitz	(Germany) Würzburger Kickers	Free	1 July 2021	
24	MF	(Germany) Anton Stach	(Germany) Mainz 05	€3,500,000	31 July 2021	
8	MF	(Germany) Nils Seufert	(Germany) SV Sandhausen	Loan	1 January 2022	
9	FW	(Denmark) Emil Berggreen		Mutual contract termination	1 January 2022	
14	MF	(Ghana) Hans Nunoo Sarpei	(Germany) FC Ingolstadt	Undisclosed	1 January 2022	

== Pre-season and friendlies ==
Win Draw Loss

9 July 2021 Friendly	Greuther Fürth (Germany)	0–1	(Germany) Bayern Munich II	Fürth, Germany
16:00 CEST (UTC+2)		Report	Copado 66'	Stadium: Sportpark Ronhof; Attendance: 1,500

14 July 2021 Friendly	Würzburger Kickers (Germany)	1–0	(Germany) Greuther Fürth	Würzburg, Germany
17:00 CEST (UTC+2)	Heinrich 43'	Report		Stadium: flyeralarm Arena; Attendance: 877; Referee: Joshua Herbert

17 July 2021 Friendly	FC Ingolstadt (Germany)	1–1	(Germany) Greuther Fürth	Ingolstadt, Germany
15:15 CEST (UTC+2)	Kutschke 35' (pen.)	Report	Christiansen 38'	Stadium: Audi Sportpark; Attendance: 1,000; Referee: Badstübner

24 July 2021 Friendly	1899 Hoffenheim (Germany)	2–2	(Germany) Greuther Fürth	Rottach-Egern, Germany
15:00 CEST (UTC+2)	Bruun Larsen 41'; Rutter 87'	Report	Hrgota 2'; Nielsen 37'	Stadium: Sportplatz Birkenmoos
Note: The match was played in four quarters 30 minutes each.

28 July 2021 Friendly	FC Augsburg (Germany)	Cancelled	(Germany) Greuther Fürth	Augsburg, Germany
11:00 CEST (UTC+2)		Report		Stadium: WWK Arena

31 July 2021 Friendly	Greuther Fürth (Germany)	Cancelled	(Spain) Eibar	Ismaning, Germany
17:30 CEST (UTC+2)				Stadium: Stadion an der Lindenstraße

31 July 2021 Friendly	Fenerbahçe (Turkey)	3–2	(Germany) Greuther Fürth	Istanbul, Turkey
18:00 CEST (UTC+2)	Zajc 4'; Dursun 8', 30'	Report	Barry 34'; Jung (yellow card) 56'; Leweling 76'	Stadium: Atatürk Olympic Stadium; Referee: Can Cengiz

25 March 2022 Friendly	Jahn Regensburg (Germany)	0–3	(Germany) Greuther Fürth	Regensburg, Germany
14:00 CET (UTC+1)	Elvedi (yellow card) 90'	Report	Itter 16'; Green 45+2'; Pululu 47'	Stadium: Sportpark am Kaulbachweg

== Competitions ==
=== Overall record ===
Competition	First match	Last match	Starting round	Final position	Record							
Competition	First match	Last match	Starting round	Final position	Pld	W	D	L	GF	GA	GD	Win %
Bundesliga	14 August 2021	14 May 2022	Matchday 1	18th	34	3	9	22	28	82	−54	8.82
DFB-Pokal	7 August 2021		First round	First round	1	0	1	0	2	2	+0	0.00
Total					35	3	10	22	30	84	−54	8.57

Source: Soccerway

=== Bundesliga ===
==== League table ====
Pos	Team	Pld	W	D	L	GF	GA	GD	Pts	Qualification or relegation
14	FC Augsburg	34	10	8	16	39	56	−17	38	
15	VfB Stuttgart	34	7	12	15	41	59	−18	33	
16	Hertha BSC (O)	34	9	6	19	37	71	−34	33	Qualification for the relegation play-offs
17	Arminia Bielefeld (R)	34	5	13	16	27	53	−26	28	Relegation to 2. Bundesliga
18	Greuther Fürth (R)	34	3	9	22	28	82	−54	18	Relegation to 2. Bundesliga

Source: DFB
Rules for classification: 1) Points; 2) Goal difference; 3) Goals scored; 4) Head-to-head results; 5) Head-to-head away goals scored; 6) Away goals scored; 7) Play-off.
(O) Play-off winners; (R) Relegated

==== Results summary ====
Overall								Home						Away					
Pld	W	D	L	GF	GA	GD	Pts	W	D	L	GF	GA	GD	W	D	L	GF	GA	GD
34	3	9	22	28	82	−54	18	3	5	9	15	33	−18	0	4	13	13	49	−36

Source: DFB

==== Results by round ====
Round	1	2	3	4	5	6	7	8	9	10	11	12	13	14	15	16	17	18	19	20	21	22	23	24	25	26	27	28	29	30	31	32	33	34
Ground	A	H	A	H	A	H	A	H	A	A	H	A	H	A	H	A	H	H	A	H	A	H	A	H	A	H	H	A	H	A	H	A	H	A
Result	L	D	L	L	L	L	L	L	L	L	L	L	L	L	W	L	D	D	D	W	L	W	L	D	L	L	D	D	L	D	L	D	L	L
Position	17	16	16	18	18	18	18	18	18	18	18	18	18	18	18	18	18	18	18	18	18	18	18	18	18	18	18	18	18	18	18	18	18	18

Source: DFB
A = Away; H = Home; W = Win; D = Draw; L = Loss

==== Matches ====
The league fixtures were announced on 25 June 2021.

14 August 2021 1	VfB Stuttgart	5–1	Greuther Fürth	Stuttgart
15:30 CEST (UTC+2)	Endo 30'; Klement 36'; Kempf 55', 76'; Al Ghaddioui 61'	Report	Seguin (yellow card) 53'; Leweling 90+3'	Stadium: Mercedes-Benz Arena; Attendance: 18,109; Referee: Felix Zwayer

21 August 2021 2	Greuther Fürth	1–1	Arminia Bielefeld	Fürth
15:30 CEST (UTC+2)	Seguin (yellow card) 5'; Nielsen (yellow card) 14'; Hrgota 50' (pen.); Sarpei (yellow card) 59'; Bauer (yellow card) 62'	Report	Klos 45'; Schöpf (yellow card) 54' (yellow-red card) 68'	Stadium: Sportpark Ronhof; Attendance: 5,890; Referee: Daniel Schlager

28 August 2021 3	Mainz 05	3–0	Greuther Fürth	Mainz
15:30 CEST (UTC+2)	Lucoqui 15'; Szalai 18'; Bell (yellow card) 25'; Kohr (yellow card) 28'; Stöger 90+2'	Report	Hoogma (yellow card) 22'; Seguin (yellow card) 45'	Stadium: Opel Arena; Attendance: 11,500; Referee: Tobias Reichel

11 September 2021 4	Greuther Fürth	0–2	VfL Wolfsburg	Fürth
15:30 CEST (UTC+2)	Seguin (yellow card) 41'; Griesbeck (yellow card) 90'	Report	Nmecha 10'; Weghorst (yellow card) 14', (goal) 90+1' (pen.); Baku (yellow card) 30'; Lukebakio (yellow card) 80'	Stadium: Sportpark Ronhof; Attendance: 9,000; Referee: Robert Hartmann

17 September 2021 5	Hertha BSC	2–1	Greuther Fürth	Berlin
20:30 CEST (UTC+2)	Boateng (yellow card) 43'; Ekkelenkamp 61'; Bauer 79' (o.g.)	Report	Nielsen (yellow card) 51'; Hrgota 57' (pen.); Barry (yellow card) 78'	Stadium: Olympiastadion; Attendance: 20,000; Referee: Tobias Stieler

24 September 2021 6	Greuther Fürth	1–3	Bayern Munich	Fürth
20:30 CEST (UTC+2)	Hrgota (yellow card) 20'; Viergever (yellow card) 53'; Abiama (yellow card) 67'; Barry (yellow card) 83'; Itten 88'	Report	Müller 10'; Kimmich 31'; Sané (yellow card) 44'; Pavard (red card) 48'; Griesbeck 68' (o.g.)	Stadium: Sportpark Ronhof; Attendance: 11,740; Referee: Robert Schröder

1 October 2021 7	1. FC Köln	3–1	Greuther Fürth	Cologne
20:30 CEST (UTC+2)	Andersson 50', (yellow card) 68'; Skhiri 55', 89'	Report	Meyerhöfer 7'; Griesbeck (yellow card) 24'	Stadium: RheinEnergieStadion; Attendance: 40,000; Referee: Matthias Jöllenbeck

16 October 2021 8	Greuther Fürth	0–1	VfL Bochum	Fürth
15:30 CEST (UTC+2)	Seguin (yellow card) 30'; Itten (yellow card) 67'	Report	Riemann (yellow card) 54'; Losilla (yellow card) 60', (goal) 80'; Mašović (yellow card) 65'; Lampropoulos (yellow card) 75'	Stadium: Sportpark Ronhof; Attendance: 10,586; Referee: Bastian Dankert

23 October 2021 9	RB Leipzig	4–1	Greuther Fürth	Leipzig
15:30 CEST (UTC+2)	Angeliño (yellow card) 15'; Kampl (yellow card) 36'; Poulsen 47'; Forsberg 52' (pen.); Szoboszlai 65'; Novoa 88'	Report	Hrgota 45' (pen.)	Stadium: Red Bull Arena; Attendance: 24,758; Referee: Christian Dingert

30 October 2021 10	SC Freiburg	3–1	Greuther Fürth	Freiburg
15:30 CEST (UTC+2)	Asta 20' (o.g.); Höfler 39'; Grifo 79' (pen.)	Report	Green (yellow card) 41'; Christiansen (yellow card) 50'; Leweling 74'	Stadium: Schwarzwald-Stadion; Attendance: 31,500; Referee: Felix Brych

7 November 2021 11	Greuther Fürth	1–2	Eintracht Frankfurt	Fürth
19:30 CET (UTC+1)	Sarpei (yellow card) 37'; Christiansen (yellow card) 65'; Hrgota (yellow card) 87'; Griesbeck (yellow card) 88'; Itten 90+2'	Report	Rode 75'; Jakić (yellow card) 89'; Borré 90+4'	Stadium: Sportpark Ronhof; Attendance: 10,244; Referee: Daniel Siebert

20 November 2021 12	Borussia Mönchengladbach	4–0	Greuther Fürth	Mönchengladbach
15:30 CET (UTC+1)	Hofmann 10', 57'; Neuhaus 28'; Pléa 43'; Stindl (yellow card) 55'	Report	Seguin (yellow card) 45+2'; Leweling (yellow card) 78'; Christiansen (yellow card) 89'	Stadium: Borussia-Park; Attendance: 38,621; Referee: Benjamin Brand

27 November 2021 13	Greuther Fürth	3–6	1899 Hoffenheim	Fürth
15:30 CET (UTC+1)	Leweling 22'; Tillman 46'; Christiansen (yellow card) 49'; Hrgota 68'	Report	Bebou 32', 62', 80'; Rutter 40', 58'; Meyerhöfer 66' (o.g.)	Stadium: Sportpark Ronhof; Attendance: 3,385; Referee: Bastian Dankert

4 December 2021 14	Bayer Leverkusen	7–1	Greuther Fürth	Leverkusen
15:30 CET (UTC+1)	Adli 12'; Tapsoba 17'; Hincapié 45'; Schick 49', 69', 74', 76'	Report	Dudziak 33'; Leweling (yellow card) 38'	Stadium: BayArena; Attendance: 10,455; Referee: Tobias Reichel

12 December 2021 15	Greuther Fürth	1–0	Union Berlin	Fürth
15:30 CET (UTC+1)	Seguin (yellow card) 33'; Nielsen 55'; Bauer (yellow card) 69'; Leweling (yellow card) 71'	Report		Stadium: Sportpark Ronhof; Attendance: 0 Referee: Sven Jablonski

15 December 2021 16	Borussia Dortmund	3–0	Greuther Fürth	Dortmund
20:30 CET (UTC+1)	Hummels (yellow card) 15'; Haaland 33' (pen.), 82'; Bellingham (yellow card) 43'; Malen 89'	Report	Bauer (yellow card) 32'; Willems (yellow card) 43'	Stadium: Signal Iduna Park; Attendance: 15,000; Referee: Daniel Schlager

18 December 2021 17	Greuther Fürth	0–0	FC Augsburg	Fürth
15:30 CET (UTC+1)	Willems (yellow card) 77'; Abiama (yellow card) 90'	Report	Caligiuri (yellow card) 38'; Oxford (yellow card) 64'; Iago (yellow card) 84'	Stadium: Sportpark Ronhof; Attendance: 0 Referee: Sascha Stegemann

8 January 2022 18	Greuther Fürth	0–0	VfB Stuttgart	Fürth
15:30 CET (UTC+1)		Report	Anton (yellow card) 42'	Stadium: Sportpark Ronhof; Attendance: 0 Referee: Felix Brych

16 January 2022 19	Arminia Bielefeld	2–2	Greuther Fürth	Bielefeld
17:30 CET (UTC+1)	Okugawa 8'; Vasiliadis (yellow card) 38'; Andrade (yellow card) 43'; Nilsson (yellow card) 52'; Castro 83'; Ramos (yellow card) 86'	Report	Itter (yellow card) 31'; Leweling 35'; Nielsen 67'	Stadium: Bielefelder Alm; Attendance: 750; Referee: Christian Dingert

22 January 2022 20	Greuther Fürth	2–1	Mainz 05	Fürth
15:30 CET (UTC+1)	Dudziak 12'; Bell 66' (o.g.); Seguin (yellow card) 86'	Report	Nebel (yellow card) 88'; Onisiwo 90+3'	Stadium: Sportpark Ronhof; Attendance: 0 Referee: Robert Schröder

6 February 2022 21	VfL Wolfsburg	4–1	Greuther Fürth	Wolfsburg
17:30 CET (UTC+1)	Vranckx 7', 49', (yellow card) 58'; Arnold 70'; Philipp 75'	Report	Hrgota 44' (pen.); Seguin (yellow card) 45+1'; Griesbeck (yellow card) 63'	Stadium: Volkswagen Arena; Attendance: 500; Referee: Martin Petersen

12 February 2022 22	Greuther Fürth	2–1	Hertha BSC	Fürth
15:30 CET (UTC+1)	Hrgota 1', 71' (pen.); Itter (yellow card) 34'; Dudziak (yellow card) 49'	Report	Stark (yellow card) 22'; Belfodil (yellow card) 29'; Jovetić (yellow card) 76'; Tousart (yellow card) 78'; Gechter 82'	Stadium: Sportpark Ronhof; Attendance: 7,919; Referee: Daniel Schlager

20 February 2022 23	Bayern Munich	4–1	Greuther Fürth	Munich
15:30 CET (UTC+1)	Lewandowski (yellow card) 45', (goal) 47', 82'; Griesbeck 61' (o.g.); Kimmich (yellow card) 88'; Choupo-Moting 90+1'	Report	Hrgota 43'; Bauer (yellow card) 80'	Stadium: Allianz Arena; Attendance: 25,000; Referee: Robert Hartmann

26 February 2022 24	Greuther Fürth	1–1	1. FC Köln	Fürth
15:30 CET (UTC+1)	Tillman (yellow card) 22'; Griesbeck 69'	Report	Özcan (yellow card) 29'; Kainz 53'; Skhiri (yellow card) 71'	Stadium: Sportpark Ronhof; Attendance: 9,200; Referee: Robert Schröder

5 March 2022 25	VfL Bochum	2–1	Greuther Fürth	Bochum
15:30 CET (UTC+1)	Leitsch 35'; Gamboa (yellow card) 44'; Losilla 71'; Pantović (yellow card) 82'	Report	Griesbeck (yellow card) 34'; Itter (yellow card) 39'; Hrgota (yellow card) 53'; Bella-Kotchap 64' (o.g.); Willems (yellow card) 73'	Stadium: Vonovia Ruhrstadion; Attendance: 19,800; Referee: Daniel Schlager

13 March 2022 26	Greuther Fürth	1–6	RB Leipzig	Fürth
19:30 CET (UTC+1)	Leweling 4'; Willems (yellow card) 23'; Abiama (yellow card) 87'	Report	Silva 17'; Forsberg 32'; Laimer 35'; Henrichs 45'; Simakan 59'; Nkunku 69'	Stadium: Sportpark Ronhof; Attendance: 9,418; Referee: Sven Jablonski

19 March 2022 27	Greuther Fürth	0–0	SC Freiburg	Fürth
15:30 CET (UTC+1)	Viergever (yellow card) 75'	Report		Stadium: Sportpark Ronhof; Attendance: 9,884; Referee: Tobias Reichel

2 April 2022 28	Eintracht Frankfurt	0–0	Greuther Fürth	Frankfurt
15:30 CEST (UTC+2)	Hauge (yellow card) 88'	Report		Stadium: Deutsche Bank Park; Attendance: 50,500; Referee: Bastian Dankert

9 April 2022 29	Greuther Fürth	0–2	Borussia Mönchengladbach	Fürth
15:30 CEST (UTC+2)	Tillman (yellow card) 24'	Report	Thuram 18'; Pléa 24' (pen.)	Stadium: Sportpark Ronhof; Attendance: 13,900; Referee: Tobias Stieler

17 April 2022 30	1899 Hoffenheim	0–0	Greuther Fürth	Sinsheim
17:30 CEST (UTC+2)	Kadeřábek (yellow card) 18'; Baumgartner (yellow card) 54'; Vogt (yellow card) 60'	Report	Green (yellow card) 39'; Bauer (yellow card) 41'; Griesbeck (yellow card) 79'	Stadium: Rhein-Neckar-Arena; Attendance: 16,110; Referee: Felix Zwayer

23 April 2022 31	Greuther Fürth	1–4	Bayer Leverkusen	Fürth
15:30 CEST (UTC+2)	Willems 5'	Report	Schick 8'; Azmoun 18'; Paulinho 58'; Palacios 84'	Stadium: Sportpark Ronhof; Attendance: 11,579; Referee: Tobias Reichel

29 April 2022 32	Union Berlin	1–1	Greuther Fürth	Berlin
20:30 CEST (UTC+2)	Ryerson (yellow card) 53'; Michel 72'; Knoche (yellow card) 77'	Report	Willems (yellow card) 31'; Hrgota 33', (yellow card) 90+1'	Stadium: Stadion An der Alten Försterei; Attendance: 22,012; Referee: Patrick Ittrich

7 May 2022 33	Greuther Fürth	1–3	Borussia Dortmund	Fürth
15:30 CEST (UTC+2)	Tillman (yellow card) 51'; Ngankam 70'	Report	Brandt 26', 72'; Passlack 77'; Akanji (yellow card) 82'	Stadium: Sportpark Ronhof; Attendance: 16,600; Referee: Christian Dingert

14 May 2022 34	FC Augsburg	2–1	Greuther Fürth	Augsburg
15:30 CEST (UTC+2)	Caligiuri 11' (pen.), (yellow card) 90+1'; Gregoritsch 84'; Gruezo (yellow card) 90+5'	Report	Christiansen (yellow card) 2'; Ngankam 23'; Griesbeck (yellow card) 43'; Asta (yellow card) 75'	Stadium: WWK Arena; Attendance: 27,907; Referee: Tobias Reichel

=== DFB-Pokal ===
7 August 2021 First round	SV Babelsberg	2–2 (a.e.t.) (5–4 p)	Greuther Fürth	Potsdam
18:30 CEST (UTC+2)	Wilton (yellow card) 7'; Flügel (yellow card) 21'; Rausch 37'; Hoffmann 70'; Frahn (yellow card) 73'; Härtel (yellow card) 90+1'; Danko (yellow card) 97'	Report	Hrgota 22' (pen.); Seufert (yellow card) 39'; Green 85'; Seguin (yellow card) 102'; Barry (yellow card) 120'	Stadium: Karl-Liebknecht-Stadion; Attendance: 3,030; Referee: Robin Braun
	Penalties
	Frahn (penalty scored); Wegener (penalty scored); Lela (penalty missed); Reimann (penalty scored); Moravec (penalty scored); Danko (penalty scored)		(penalty scored) Green; (penalty scored) Seguin; (penalty missed) Hrgota; (penalty scored) Barry; (penalty scored) Sarpei; (penalty missed) Bauer

== Statistics ==
=== Appearances and goals ===
No.	Pos	Nat	Player	Total		Bundesliga		DFB-Pokal	
No.	Pos	Nat	Player	Apps	Goals	Apps	Goals	Apps	Goals
Goalkeepers
1	GK	(Germany) GER	Marius Funk	9	0	8	0	1	0
25	GK	(Germany) GER	Leon Schaffran	0	0	0	0	0	0
26	GK	(Sweden) SWE	Andreas Linde	12	0	12	0	0	0
30	GK	(Germany) GER	Sascha Burchert	14	0	14	0	0	0
Defenders
2	DF	(Germany) GER	Simon Asta	14	0	9+4	0	1	0
4	DF	(Germany) GER	Maximilian Bauer	27	0	18+8	0	1	0
15	DF	(Netherlands) NED	Jetro Willems	24	1	20+4	1	0	0
18	DF	(Germany) GER	Marco Meyerhöfer	26	1	25+1	1	0	0
23	DF	(Germany) GER	Gideon Jung	6	0	1+4	0	1	0
24	DF	(Netherlands) NED	Nick Viergever	24	0	24	0	0	0
27	DF	(Germany) GER	Luca Itter	24	0	16+8	0	0	0
29	DF	(Germany) GER	Elias Kratzer	0	0	0	0	0	0
32	DF	(France) FRA	Abdourahmane Barry	9	0	1+7	0	0+1	0
Midfielders
13	MF	(Germany) GER	Max Christiansen	27	0	22+5	0	0	0
20	MF	(Germany) GER	Tobias Raschl	10	0	7+3	0	0	0
21	MF	(United States) USA	Timothy Tillman	30	1	23+6	1	1	0
22	MF	(Germany) GER	Sebastian Griesbeck	29	1	28+1	1	0	0
28	MF	(Tunisia) TUN	Jeremy Dudziak	22	2	15+7	2	0	0
33	MF	(Germany) GER	Paul Seguin	28	0	23+4	0	1	0
37	MF	(United States) USA	Julian Green	25	1	12+12	0	1	1
39	MF	(Germany) GER	Mert-Yusuf Torlak	0	0	0	0	0	0
Forwards
7	FW	(Germany) GER	Robin Kehr	0	0	0	0	0	0
9	FW	(Angola) ANG	Afimico Pululu	8	0	0+8	0	0	0
10	FW	(Sweden) SWE	Branimir Hrgota	35	10	33+1	9	1	1
11	FW	(Nigeria) NGR	Dickson Abiama	25	0	5+19	0	0+1	0
16	FW	(Norway) NOR	Håvard Nielsen	26	2	14+12	2	0	0
17	FW	(Germany) GER	Jessic Ngankam	6	2	4+2	2	0	0
40	FW	(Germany) GER	Jamie Leweling	34	5	22+11	5	1	0
Players transferred out during the season
5	DF	(Netherlands) NED	Justin Hoogma	4	0	3	0	1	0
6	MF	(Germany) GER	Adrian Fein	4	0	0+3	0	0+1	0
8	MF	(Germany) GER	Nils Seufert	5	0	1+3	0	1	0
9	FW	(Denmark) DEN	Emil Berggreen	0	0	0	0	0	0
14	MF	(Ghana) GHA	Hans Nunoo Sarpei	9	0	7+1	0	0+1	0
19	FW	(Switzerland) SUI	Cedric Itten	12	2	7+5	2	0	0

Last updated: 14 May 2022
Source: Competitions

=== Goalscorers ===
Rank	Pos.	No.	Nat.	Name	Bundesliga	DFB-Pokal	Total
1	FW	10	(Sweden)	Branimir Hrgota	9	1	10
2	FW	40	(Germany)	Jamie Leweling	5	0	5
3	FW	16	(Norway)	Håvard Nielsen	2	0	2
3	FW	17	(Germany)	Jessic Ngankam	2	0	2
3	FW	19	(Switzerland)	Cedric Itten	2	0	2
3	MF	28	(Tunisia)	Jeremy Dudziak	2	0	2
7	DF	15	(Netherlands)	Jetro Willems	1	0	1
7	DF	18	(Germany)	Marco Meyerhöfer	1	0	1
7	MF	21	(United States)	Timothy Tillman	1	0	1
7	MF	22	(Germany)	Sebastian Griesbeck	1	0	1
7	MF	37	(United States)	Julian Green	0	1	1
Own goals					2	0	2
Totals					28	2	30

Last updated: 14 May 2022
