= 2020–21 SpVgg Greuther Fürth season =

SpVgg Greuther Fürth
2020–21 season
- Chairman: Fred Höfler
- Manager: Stefan Leitl
- Stadium: Sportpark Ronhof
- 2. Bundesliga: 2nd (promoted)
- DFB-Pokal: Round of 16
- Top goalscorer: League: Branimir Hrgota (16); All: Branimir Hrgota (16)
Home colours	Away colours	Third colours

The 2020–21 season was SpVgg Greuther Fürth's 118th season in existence and the club's eighth consecutive season in the second flight of German football. In addition to the domestic league, Greuther Fürth participated in this season's edition of the DFB-Pokal. The season covered the period from 1 July 2020 to 30 June 2021.

== Players ==
=== Current squad ===
As of 20 August 2020

Note: Flags indicate national team as defined under FIFA eligibility rules; some limited exceptions apply. Players may hold more than one non-FIFA nationality.

No.	Pos.	Nation	Player
1	GK	GER	Marius Funk
4	DF	GER	Maximilian Bauer
5	DF	ALB	Mërgim Mavraj
7	FW	GER	Robin Kehr
10	FW	SWE	Branimir Hrgota
14	MF	GHA	Hans Nunoo Sarpei
15	MF	GER	Sebastian Ernst
16	FW	NOR	Håvard Nielsen
18	DF	GER	Marco Meyerhöfer
19	FW	NGR	Dickson Abiama
21	MF	GER	Timothy Tillman
22	DF	GER	David Raum

No.	Pos.	Nation	Player
23	DF	GER	Paul Jaeckel
24	MF	GER	Anton Stach
25	GK	GER	Leon Schaffran
27	MF	GER	Kenny Prince Redondo
30	GK	GER	Sascha Burchert
32	DF	FRA	Abdourahmane Barry
33	MF	GER	Paul Seguin
34	MF	GER	Marvin Stefaniak (on loan from VfL Wolfsburg)
36	DF	GER	Alexander Lungwitz
37	MF	USA	Julian Green
40	FW	GER	Jamie Leweling

== Pre-season and friendlies ==
Win Draw Loss Fixtures

== Competitions ==
=== Overview ===
Competition	First match	Last match	Starting round	Final position	Record							
Competition	First match	Last match	Starting round	Final position	Pld	W	D	L	GF	GA	GD	Win %
2. Bundesliga	18 September 2020	23 May 2021	Matchday 1	2nd	34	18	10	6	69	44	+25	52.94
DFB-Pokal	11 September 2020	2 February 2021	First round	Round of 16	3	1	1	1	8	5	+3	33.33
Total					37	19	11	7	77	49	+28	51.35

Last updated: 23 May 2021
Source: Soccerway

=== 2. Bundesliga ===
==== League table ====
Pos	Team	Pld	W	D	L	GF	GA	GD	Pts	Qualification or relegation
1	VfL Bochum (C, P)	34	21	4	9	66	39	+27	67	Promotion to Bundesliga
2	Greuther Fürth (P)	34	18	10	6	69	44	+25	64	Promotion to Bundesliga
3	Holstein Kiel	34	18	8	8	57	35	+22	62	Qualification for promotion play-offs
4	Hamburger SV	34	16	10	8	71	44	+27	58	
5	Fortuna Düsseldorf	34	16	8	10	55	46	+9	56	

Source: DFB
Rules for classification: 1) Points; 2) Goal difference; 3) Goals scored; 4) Head-to-head points; 5) Head-to-head goal difference; 6) Head-to-head away goals scored; 7) Away goals scored; 8) Play-off.
(C) Champions; (P) Promoted

==== Results summary ====
Overall								Home						Away					
Pld	W	D	L	GF	GA	GD	Pts	W	D	L	GF	GA	GD	W	D	L	GF	GA	GD
34	18	10	6	69	44	+25	64	9	4	4	34	23	+11	9	6	2	35	21	+14

Last updated: 23 May 2021.

==== Results by round ====
Round	1	2	3	4	5	6	7	8	9	10	11	12	13	14	15	16	17	18	19	20	21	22	23	24	25	26	27	28	29	30	31	32	33	34
Ground	H	A	A	H	A	H	A	H	A	H	A	H	A	H	A	H	A	A	H	H	A	H	A	H	A	H	A	A	H	A	H	H	A	H
Result	D	D	D	L	W	W	W	W	W	L	W	L	W	W	L	D	D	W	W	W	D	W	D	L	W	D	W	D	W	L	W	D	W	W
Position	9	12	13	16	10	2	2	2	2	2	2	3	2	2	2	2	2	2	2	2	2	2	2	2	2	2	2	2	2	2	2	2	2	2

Updated to match(es) played on 23 May 2021. Source:
A = Away; H = Home; W = Win; D = Draw; L = Loss

==== Matches ====
The league fixtures were announced on 7 August 2020.

20 September 2020 1	Greuther Fürth	1–1	VfL Osnabrück	Fürth
13:30	Seguin 15'	Report	Santos 26'	Stadium: Sportpark Ronhof Thomas Sommer; Attendance: 3,000; Referee: Robert Kampka

25 September 2020 2	Erzgebirge Aue	1–1	Greuther Fürth	Aue
18:30	Krüger 23'	Report	Ernst 6'	Stadium: Sparkassen-Erzgebirgsstadion; Attendance: 999; Referee: Felix Brych

4 October 2020 3	Würzburger Kickers	2–2	Greuther Fürth	Würzburg
13:30	Herrmann 2'; Baumann 64' (pen.)	Report	Hrgota 26'; Bauer 90+2'	Stadium: flyeralarm Arena; Attendance: 1,877; Referee: Michael Bacher

17 October 2020 4	Greuther Fürth	0–1	Hamburger SV	Fürth
13:00		Report	Khaled Narey 45+3'	Stadium: Sportpark Ronhof Thomas Sommer; Attendance: 3,325; Referee: Martin Petersen

24 October 2020 5	Holstein Kiel	1–3	Greuther Fürth	Kiel
13:00	Mühling 65'	Report	Seguin 7'; Hrgota 28'; Nielsen 58'	Stadium: Holstein-Stadion; Attendance: 2,239; Referee: Timo Gerach

1 November 2020 6	Greuther Fürth	4–1	Hannover 96	Fürth
13:30	Green 22'; Seguin 26'; Hrgota 52' 68'	Report	Weydandt 58'; Bijol (yellow card) 59'	Stadium: Sportpark Ronhof Thomas Sommer; Attendance: 0 Referee: (Germany) Christof Günsch

7 November 2020 7	Bochum	0–2	Greuther Fürth	Bochum
13:00	Leitsch (yellow card) 66'	Report	Seguin 9' (yellow card) 24'; Ernst 34'; Sarpei (yellow card) 60'; Mavraj (yellow card) 80'	Stadium: Vonovia Ruhrstadion; Attendance: 0 Referee: (Germany) Bastian Dankert

22 November 2020 8	Greuther Fürth	3–1	Jahn Regensburg	Fürth
13:30	Jaeckel 3'; Mavraj (yellow card) 32'; Seguin 56'; Green 63'	Report	Caliskaner (yellow card) 14'; Saller (yellow card) 22'; Jaeckel 33' (o.g.); Stolze (yellow card) 66'	Stadium: Sportpark Ronhof Thomas Sommer; Attendance: 0 Referee: (Germany) Benjamin Brand

29 November 2020 9	Nürnberg	2–3	Greuther Fürth	Nürnberg
13:30	Schäffler 8'; Dovedan 78'	Report	Nielsen 3' 36'; Hrgota 47'	Stadium: Max-Morlock-Stadion; Attendance: 0 Referee: (Germany) Felix Brych

5 December 2020 10	Greuther Fürth	0–1	Heidenheim	Fürth
13:00	Green (yellow card) 49'	Report	Mohr (yellow card) 43'; Burnić (yellow card) 45'; Theuerkauf 60'	Stadium: Sportpark Ronhof Thomas Sommer; Attendance: 0 Referee: (Germany) Thorben Siewer

11 December 2020 11	Sandhausen	0–3	Greuther Fürth	Sandhausen
18:30	Taffertshofer (yellow card) 71'; Ouahim (yellow card) 80'; Paurević (yellow card) 86'	Report	Green 30'; Leweling 33'; Abiama 87'	Stadium: BWT-Stadion am Hardtwald; Attendance: 0 Referee: (Germany) Arne Aarnink

15 December 2020 12	Greuther Fürth	0–4	Darmstadt 98	Fürth
18:30	Sarpei (yellow card) 18'	Report	Skarke 17'; Mai (yellow card) 24' (yellow-red card) 83'; Dursun 45' 49'; Schnellhardt (yellow card) 52'; Höhn 76'; Rapp (yellow card) 84'	Stadium: Sportpark Ronhof Thomas Sommer; Attendance: 0 Referee: (Germany) Christian Dingert
Note: COVID-19 pandemic in Germany

19 December 2020 13	Eintracht Braunschweig	0–3	Greuther Fürth	Braunschweig
13:00	Kammerbauer (yellow card) 27'; Otto (yellow card) 35'; Schwenk (yellow card) 45'; Kroos (yellow card) 77'; Proschwitz (yellow card) 81'	Report	Green (yellow card) 23'; Ernst 50'; Abiama 75'; Kehr 90+3'	Stadium: Eintracht-Stadion; Attendance: 0 Referee: (Germany) Robert Hartmann
Note: COVID-19 pandemic in Germany

3 January 2021 14	Greuther Fürth	2–1	St.Pauli	Fürth
13:30 CET	Green 24' (pen.); Nielsen 27'; Seguin (yellow card) 79'	Report	Knoll (yellow card) 23'; Paqarada (yellow card) 38'; Aremu (yellow card) 66'; Ohlsson (yellow card) 80'; Flach 82'	Stadium: Sportpark Ronhof Thomas Sommer; Attendance: 0 Referee: (Germany) Tobias Reichel
Note: COVID-19 pandemic in Germany

8 January 2021 15	Karlsruher SC	3–2	Greuther Fürth	Karlsruhe
18:30 CET	Goller 2' 45+1'; Lorenz (yellow card) 6'; Heise (yellow card) 40'; Gondorf (yellow card) 42'; Hofmann 84'	Report	Nielsen 23'; Ernst 28'; Bauer (yellow card) 59'	Stadium: Wildparkstadion; Attendance: 0 Referee: (Germany) Timo Gerach
Note: COVID-19 pandemic in Germany

15 January 2021 16	Greuther Fürth	1–1	Paderborn	Fürth
18:30 CET	Ernst 8'; Green (yellow card) 45+1'; Mavraj (yellow card) 59'; Abiama (yellow card) 90+4'	Report	Führich 24'	Stadium: Sportpark Ronhof Thomas Sommer; Attendance: 0 Referee: (Germany) Matthias Jöllenbeck
Note: COVID-19 pandemic in Germany

22 January 2021 17	Fortuna Düsseldorf	3–3	Greuther Fürth	Düsseldorf
18:30 CET	Karaman 35'; Krajnc (yellow card) 47'; Peterson 49'; Hoffmann (yellow card) 76'; Danso 83'; Kownacki (yellow card) 87'	Report	Hoffmann 26' (o.g.); Green 29'; Ernst 53'; Raum (yellow card) 74'; Abiama (yellow card) 75'	Stadium: Merkur Spiel-Arena; Attendance: 0 Referee: (Germany) Frank Willenborg
Note: COVID-19 pandemic in Germany

26 January 2021 18	Osnabrück	0–1	Greuther Fürth	Osnabrück
20:30 CET	Wolze (yellow card) 31'; Reis (yellow card) 75'; Schmidt (yellow card) 90+3'	Report	Green 37'; Sarpei (yellow card) 81'	Stadium: Stadion an der Bremer Brücke; Attendance: 0 Referee: (Germany) Martin Thomsen
Note: COVID-19 pandemic in Germany

29 January 2021 19	Greuther Fürth	3–0	Erzgebirge Aue	Fürth
18:30 CET	Hrgota 15' 34'; Green (yellow card) 22' (goal) 60'; Bauer (yellow card) 53'; Meyerhöfer (yellow card) 66'	Report	Gnjatić (yellow card) 32'; Ballas (yellow card) 78'	Stadium: Sportpark Ronhof Thomas Sommer; Attendance: 0 Referee: (Germany) Robert Schröder
Note: COVID-19 pandemic in Germany

7 February 2021 20	Greuther Fürth	4–1	Würzburger Kickers	Fürth
13:30 CET	Burchert (yellow card) 17'; Abiama 28'; Bauer (yellow card) 45'; Hrgota 50' 80' (pen.); Stach (yellow card) 75'; Kehr 87'	Report	Munsy 15'; Douglas (yellow card) 61'; Lotrič (yellow card) 76'; Hägele (yellow card) 90+1'	Stadium: Sportpark Ronhof Thomas Sommer; Attendance: 0 Referee: (Germany) Aarne Aarnink
Note: COVID-19 pandemic in Germany

=== DFB-Pokal ===
12 September 2020 First round	RSV Meinerzhagen	1–6 (a.e.t.)	Greuther Fürth	Fürth
15:30 CEST (UTC+2)	Wurm 50'	Report	Ernst 72'; Green 98'; Meyerhöfer 103', 105'; Abiama 113', 118'	Stadium: Sportpark Ronhof Thomas Sommer; Attendance: 0 Referee: Alexander Sather

22 December 2020 Second round	1899 Hoffenheim	2–2 (a.e.t.) (6–7 p)	Greuther Fürth	Sinsheim
18:30 CET (UTC+1)	Baumgartner (yellow card) 5'; Kramarić 13'; Akpoguma 49', (yellow card) 115'; Bebou (yellow card) 62'; Kasim (yellow card) 102'; Gaćinović (yellow card) 105'	Report	Stach (yellow card) 10'; Ernst 21'; Meyerhöfer 46'; Jaeckel (yellow card) 80'; Seguin (penalty missed) 90+4'; Hrgota (yellow card) 101'	Stadium: Rhein-Neckar-Arena; Attendance: 0 Referee: Sören Storks
	Penalties
	Kramarić (penalty scored); Rudy (penalty scored); Skov (penalty scored); Adamyan (penalty scored); Vogt (penalty missed); Bogarde (penalty missed); Akpoguma (penalty scored); Sessegnon (penalty scored); Kasim (penalty missed)		(penalty missed) Bauer; (penalty scored) Raum; (penalty scored) Seguin; (penalty scored) Sarpei; (penalty scored) Hrgota; (penalty missed) Ernst; (penalty scored) Jaeckel; (penalty scored) Tillman; (penalty scored) Meyerhöfer

2 February 2021 Round of 16	Werder Bremen	2–0	Greuther Fürth	Bremen
20:45 CET (UTC+1)	Möhwald 12'; Agu 73'; Moisander (yellow card) 87'; Gebre Selassie (yellow card) 90+4'	Report	Bauer (yellow card) 22'; Stach (yellow card) 39'	Stadium: Wohninvest Weserstadion; Attendance: 0 Referee: Guido Winkmann

== Statistics ==
=== Appearances and goals ===
No.	Pos	Nat	Player	Total		2. Bundesliga		DFB-Pokal	
No.	Pos	Nat	Player	Apps	Goals	Apps	Goals	Apps	Goals
Goalkeepers
1	GK	(Germany) GER	Marius Funk	1	0	1	0	0	0
25	GK	(Germany) GER	Leon Schaffran	0	0	0	0	0	0
30	GK	(Germany) GER	Sascha Burchert	36	0	33	0	3	0
Defenders
2	DF	(Germany) GER	Simon Asta	5	0	2+3	0	0	0
4	DF	(Germany) GER	Maximilian Bauer	32	2	25+4	2	3	0
5	DF	(Albania) ALB	Mërgim Mavraj	19	0	18+1	0	0	0
18	DF	(Germany) GER	Marco Meyerhöfer	36	3	32+1	0	3	3
22	DF	(Germany) GER	David Raum	37	1	32+2	1	3	0
23	DF	(Germany) GER	Paul Jaeckel	25	1	22+1	1	1+1	0
27	DF	(Germany) GER	Luca Itter	9	0	4+4	0	0+1	0
32	DF	(France) FRA	Abdourahmane Barry	10	0	6+3	0	1	0
Midfielders
8	MF	(Bosnia and Herzegovina) BIH	Marijan Ćavar	1	0	0+1	0	0	0
14	MF	(Ghana) GHA	Hans Nunoo Sarpei	31	1	15+13	1	2+1	0
15	MF	(Germany) GER	Sebastian Ernst	36	9	30+3	7	3	2
21	MF	(United States) USA	Timothy Tillman	27	0	3+21	0	0+3	0
24	MF	(Germany) GER	Anton Stach	33	1	21+9	1	2+1	0
33	MF	(Germany) GER	Paul Seguin	36	7	33	7	2+1	0
37	MF	(United States) USA	Julian Green	33	10	28+2	9	3	1
Forwards
7	FW	(Germany) GER	Robin Kehr	9	2	0+8	2	0+1	0
9	FW	(Denmark) DEN	Emil Berggreen	4	0	0+4	0	0	0
10	FW	(Sweden) SWE	Branimir Hrgota	34	16	29+2	16	2+1	0
16	FW	(Norway) NOR	Håvard Nielsen	37	11	31+3	11	3	0
19	FW	(Nigeria) NGR	Dickson Abiama	32	9	3+26	7	0+3	2
40	FW	(Germany) GER	Jamie Leweling	27	1	6+18	1	2+1	0
Players transferred out during the season

Last updated: 23 May 2021
Source: Competitions
