= 2019–20 SpVgg Greuther Fürth season =

SpVgg Greuther Fürth
2019–20 season
- Chairman: Fred Höfler
- Manager: Stefan Leitl
- Stadium: Sportpark Ronhof
- 2. Bundesliga: 9th
- DFB-Pokal: First round
- Top goalscorer: Branimir Hrgota (10)
Home colours	Away colours	Third colours

The 2019–20 season was Greuther Fürth's 117th season in existence, and their seventh consecutive season in the 2. Bundesliga since relegation from the Bundesliga in 2013. In addition to the domestic league, Greuther Fürth participated in this season's edition of the DFB-Pokal. The season covered the period from 1 July 2019 to 30 June 2020.

== Players ==
=== Current squad ===
As of 31 January 2020

Note: Flags indicate national team as defined under FIFA eligibility rules; some limited exceptions apply. Players may hold more than one non-FIFA nationality.

No.	Pos.	Nation	Player
1	GK	GER	Marius Funk
3	DF	GER	Maximilian Wittek
5	DF	ALB	Mërgim Mavraj
7	FW	GER	Robin Kehr
9	FW	GER	Shawn Parker
10	FW	GER	Daniel Keita-Ruel
11	MF	GER	David Raum
13	DF	GER	Marco Caligiuri (captain)
14	MF	GHA	Hans Nunoo Sarpei
15	MF	GER	Sebastian Ernst
16	FW	NOR	Håvard Nielsen
17	FW	SWE	Branimir Hrgota
18	DF	GER	Marco Meyerhöfer
19	FW	GER	Benedikt Zahn

No.	Pos.	Nation	Player
21	DF	GER	Timothy Tillman
22	DF	SWE	Felix Beijmo (on loan from Werder Bremen)
23	DF	GER	Paul Jaeckel
24	DF	GER	Maximilian Sauer
25	GK	GER	Leon Schaffran
27	MF	GER	Kenny Prince Redondo
30	GK	GER	Sascha Burchert
31	FW	GER	Malik McLemore
33	MF	GER	Paul Seguin
34	FW	GER	Marvin Stefaniak (on loan from VfL Wolfsburg)
36	DF	GER	Alexander Lungwitz
37	MF	USA	Julian Green
38	DF	GER	Maximilian Bauer
40	MF	GER	Jamie Leweling

== Friendly matches ==
Win Draw Loss

4 July 2019	SC Eltersdorf (Germany)	1-3	(Germany) Greuther Fürth	Erlangen, Germany
18:30 CEST (UTC+2)				Stadium: Sportanlage Langenau

10 July 2019	Greuther Fürth (Germany)	1–1	(England) Huddersfield Town	Fürth, Germany
11:00 CEST (UTC+2)				Stadium: Sportpark Ronhof

10 July 2019	Greuther Fürth (Germany)	0–1	(England) Huddersfield Town	Fürth, Germany
17:00 CEST (UTC+2)				Stadium: Sportpark Ronhof

13 July 2019	FC Augsburg (Germany)	1–0	(Germany) Greuther Fürth	Kirchheim bei München, Germany
15:00 CEST (UTC+2)				Stadium: Sportpark Heimstetten

10 January 2020	Greuther Fürth (Germany)	1–1	(Germany) Bayern München II	Fürth, Germany
15:30 CEST (UTC+2)				Stadium: Sportpark Ronhof

17 January 2020	FC Vaduz (Liechtenstein)	0–0	(Germany) Greuther Fürth	Belek, Turkey
12:00 CEST (UTC+2)

17 January 2020	Hallescher FC (Germany)	3–2	(Germany) Greuther Fürth	Belek, Turkey
17:00 CEST (UTC+2)

20 January 2020	Lechia Gdańsk (Poland)	3–0	(Germany) Greuther Fürth	Belek, Turkey
14:00 CEST (UTC+2)

== Competitions ==
Win Draw Loss Fixtures

=== Overview ===
Competition	First match	Last match	Starting round	Final position	Record							
Competition	First match	Last match	Starting round	Final position	Pld	W	D	L	GF	GA	GD	Win %
2. Bundesliga	26 July 2019	28 June 2020	Matchday 1	9th	34	11	11	12	46	45	+1	32.35
DFB-Pokal	11 August 2019	11 August 2020	First round	First Round	1	0	0	1	0	2	−2	0.00
Total					35	11	11	13	46	47	−1	31.43

Last updated: 01 July 2020

=== 2. Bundesliga ===
==== League table ====
Pos	Team	Pld	W	D	L	GF	GA	GD	Pts
7	Erzgebirge Aue	34	13	8	13	46	48	−2	47
8	VfL Bochum	34	11	13	10	53	51	+2	46
9	Greuther Fürth	34	11	11	12	46	45	+1	44
10	SV Sandhausen	34	10	13	11	43	45	−2	43
11	Holstein Kiel	34	11	10	13	53	56	−3	43

Source: DFB
Rules for classification: 1) Points; 2) Goal difference; 3) Goals scored; 4) Head-to-head points; 5) Head-to-head goal difference; 6) Head-to-head away goals scored; 7) Away goals scored; 8) Play-off.

==== Results by round ====
Round	1	2	3	4	5	6	7	8	9	10	11	12	13	14	15	16	17	18	19	20	21	22	23	24	25	26	27	28	29	30	31	32	33	34
Ground	H	A	H	A	A	H	A	H	A	H	A	H	A	H	A	H	A	A	H	A	H	H	A	H	A	H	H	A	H	A	A	H	A	H
Result	L	W	W	D	D	W	L	L	L	W	D	W	L	D	L	W	W	L	W	W	L	L	D	W	D	D	L	D	L	D	W	D	D	L
Position	18	8	6	6	7	4	6	10	12	6	7	5	6	7	11	9	7	8	7	4	5	7	6	5	5	5	6	7	6	9	7	8	8	9

Updated to match(es) played on 01 July 2020. Source:
A = Away; H = Home; W = Win; D = Draw; L = Loss

==== Matches ====
28 July 2019 1	SpVgg Greuther Fürth	0–2	FC Erzgebirge Aue	Fürth
15:30 CEST (UTC+2)		Report	Nazarov 25'; Hochscheidt 90'	Stadium: Sportpark Ronhof; Attendance: 9,970; Referee: Daniel Siebert

2 August 2019 2	FC St. Pauli	1–3	SpVgg Greuther Fürth	Hamburg
15:30 CEST (UTC+2)	Diamantakos 45'	Report	Keita-Ruel 17', 35'; Green 70'	Stadium: Millerntor-Stadion; Attendance: 29,546; Referee: Sven Jablonski

18 August 2019 3	SpVgg Greuther Fürth	1–0	Jahn Regensburg	Fürth
13:30 CEST (UTC+2)	Green 74'	Report		Stadium: Sportpark Ronhof; Attendance: 9,665; Referee: Marco Fritz

24 August 2020 4	Hannover 96	1–1	SpVgg Greuther Fürth	Hannover
13:00 CEST (UTC+2)	Weydandt 47'	Report	Seguin 22'	Stadium: HDI-Arena; Attendance: 25,300; Referee: René Rohde

31 August 2020 5	Arminia Bielefeld	2–2	SpVgg Greuther Fürth	Bielefeld
13:00 CEST (UTC+2)	Klos 28' (pen.); Edmundsson 62'	Report	Hrgota 4'; Nielsen 22'	Stadium: SchücoArena; Attendance: 15,820; Referee: Tobias Reichel

13 September 2019 6	SpVgg Greuther Fürth	2–1	SV Wehen Wiesbaden	Fürth
18:30 CEST (UTC+2)	Keita-Ruel 81', 90+1' (pen.)	Report	Schäffler 46'	Stadium: Sportpark Ronhof; Attendance: 8,730; Referee: Benedikt Kempkes

21 September 2019 7	VfB Stuttgart	2–0	SpVgg Greuther Fürth	Stuttgart
13:00 CEST (UTC+2)	Didavi 2'; Förster 82'	Report		Stadium: Mercedes-Benz Arena; Attendance: 50,543; Referee: Sören Storks

29 September 2019 8	SpVgg Greuther Fürth	0–3	Holstein Kiel	Fürth
13:30 CEST (UTC+2)		Report	Serra 26'; Baku 49', 61'	Stadium: Sportpark Ronhof; Attendance: 9,350; Referee: Aarne Aarnink

5 October 2019 9	Hamburger SV	2–0	SpVgg Greuther Fürth	Hamburg
13:00 CEST (UTC+2)	Dudziak 49'; Kittel 85'	Report		Stadium: Volksparkstadion; Attendance: 44,180; Referee: Florian Heft

18 October 2019 10	SpVgg Greuther Fürth	2–0	Dynamo Dresden	Fürth
18:30 CEST (UTC+2)	Keita-Ruel 7', 38'	Report		Stadium: Sportpark Ronhof; Referee: Robert Kampka

27 October 2019 11	VfL Osnabrück	0–0	SpVgg Greuther Fürth	Osnabrück
13:00 CEST (UTC+2)		Report		Stadium: Bremer Brücke; Attendance: 13,386; Referee: Sven Waschitzki

2 November 2019 12	SpVgg Greuther Fürth	3–1	SV Darmstadt 98	Fürth
13:00 CEST (UTC+2)	Hrgota 31', 47'; Höhn 37' (o.g.)	Report	Pálsson 87'	Stadium: Sportpark Ronhof; Attendance: 8,225; Referee: Harm Osmers

9 November 2019 13	SV Sandhausen	3–2	SpVgg Greuther Fürth	Sandhausen
13:00 CEST (UTC+2)	Behrens 45+1' (pen.), 64'; Bouhaddouz 90+3'	Report	Green 14'; Hrgota 52'	Stadium: BWT-Stadion am Hardtwald; Attendance: 5,632; Referee: Johann Pfeifer

24 November 2019 14	SpVgg Greuther Fürth	0–0	1. FC Nürnberg	Fürth
13:30 CEST (UTC+2)		Report		Stadium: Sportpark Ronhof; Attendance: 15,000; Referee: Manuel Gräfe

1 December 2019 15	1. FC Heidenheim	1–0	SpVgg Greuther Fürth	Heidenheim
13:30 CEST (UTC+2)	Kleindienst 63'	Report		Stadium: Voith-Arena; Attendance: 10,700; Referee: Frank Willenborg

7 December 2019 16	SpVgg Greuther Fürth	3–1	VfL Bochum	Fürth
13:00 CEST (UTC+2)	Hrgota 17', 87'; Leweling 90+4'	Report	Ganvoula 70'	Stadium: Sportpark Ronhof; Attendance: 8,875; Referee: Nicolas Winter

14 December 2019 17	Karlsruher SC	1–5	SpVgg Greuther Fürth	Karlsruhe
13:00 CEST (UTC+2)	Hofmann 26'	Report	Hrgota 19'; Mohr 29'; Jäckel 61'; Nielsen 77'; Leweling 90+2'	Stadium: Wildparkstadion; Attendance: 12,750; Referee: Sören Storks

21 December 2019 18	Erzgebirge Aue	3–1	SpVgg Greuther Fürth	Aue
13:00 CEST (UTC+2)	Hochscheidt 12'; Nazarov 64' (pen.); Krüger 66'	Report	Hrgota 80' (pen.)	Stadium: Erzgebirgsstadion; Attendance: 13,200; Referee: Martin Thomsen

28 January 2020 19	SpVgg Greuther Fürth	3-0	FC St. Pauli	Fürth
20:30 CEST (UTC+2)	Hrgota 43'; Leweling 86'; Keita-Ruel 90+2'	Report		Stadium: Sportpark Ronhof; Attendance: 9,220; Referee: Christof Günsch

31 January 2020 20	Jahn Regensburg	0–2	SpVgg Greuther Fürth	Regensburg
17:30 CEST (UTC+2)		Report	Wittek 11'; Nielsen 15'	Stadium: Arena Regensburg; Attendance: 11,013; Referee: Sven Waschitzki

9 February 2020 21	SpVgg Greuther Fürth	1–3	Hannover 96	Fürth
13:30 CEST (UTC+2)	Anton 74' (o.g.)		Haraguchi 41'; Elez (yellow card) 25' (red card) 62'; Teuchert 70'; Stehle 90+6'	Stadium: Sportpark Ronhof; Attendance: 9,580; Referee: Sören Storks

15 February 2020 22	SpVgg Greuther Fürth	2–4	Arminia Bielefeld	Fürth
13:00 CEST (UTC+2)	Nielsen 73'; Redondo 90+2'		Brunner 13'; Klos 35'; Soukou 68' (pen.); Jäckel 78' (o.g.)	Stadium: Sportpark Ronhof; Attendance: 8,770; Referee: Tobias Stieler

21 February 2020 23	SV Wehen Wiesbaden	1–1	SpVgg Greuther Fürth	Wiesbaden
18:30 CEST (UTC+2)	Kyereh 18'	Report	Nielsen 49'	Stadium: BRITA-Arena; Attendance: 3,961; Referee: Florian Heft

29 February 2020 24	SpVgg Greuther Fürth	2–0	VfB Stuttgart	Fürth
12:00 CEST (UTC+2)	Caligiuri 48'; Ernst 76'	Report		Stadium: Sportpark Ronhof; Attendance: 13,490; Referee: Thorben Siewer

8 March 2020 25	Holstein Kiel	1–1	SpVgg Greuther Fürth	Kiel
13:30 CEST (UTC+2)	Mühling 35' (pen.)	Report	Ernst 2'	Stadium: Holstein-Stadion; Attendance: 9,390; Referee: Frank Willenborg

17 May 2020 26	SpVgg Greuther Fürth	2–2	Hamburger SV	Fürth
13:30 CEST (UTC+2)	Nielsen 35'; Nielsen 90+4'	Report	Pohjanpalo 41'; Dudziak 48'	Stadium: Sportpark Ronhof; Attendance: 0 Referee: Robert Hartmann

26 May 2020 28	SpVgg Greuther Fürth	0–2	VfL Osnabrück	Fürth
17:30 CEST (UTC+2)		Report	Blacha 9'; Schmidt 58'	Stadium: Sportpark Ronhof; Attendance: 0 Referee: Tobias Reichel

29 May 2020 29	SV Darmstadt 98	1–1	SpVgg Greuther Fürth	Darmstadt
17:30 CEST (UTC+2)	Schnellhardt 56'	Report	Stefaniak 87'	Stadium: Merck-Stadion am Böllenfalltor; Attendance: 0 Referee: Sven Waschitzki

5 June 2020 30	SpVgg Greuther Fürth	1–2	SV Sandhausen	Fürth
17:30 CEST (UTC+2)	Keita-Ruel 71'	Report	Behrens 15' (pen.); Biada 39'	Stadium: Sportpark Ronhof; Attendance: 0 Referee: Matthias Jöllenbeck

9 June 2020 27	Dynamo Dresden	1–1	SpVgg Greuther Fürth	Dresden
17:30 CEST (UTC+2)	Makienok 54'	Report	Keita-Ruel 14'	Stadium: Rudolf-Harbig-Stadion; Attendance: 0 Referee: Christian Günsch

13 June 2020 31	1. FC Nürnberg	0–1	SpVgg Greuther Fürth	Nürnberg
13:00 CEST (UTC+2)		Report	Raum 56'	Stadium: Max-Morlock-Stadion; Attendance: 0 Referee: Tobias Reichel

16 June 2020 32	SpVgg Greuther Fürth	0–0	1. FC Heidenheim	Fürth
17:30 CEST (UTC+2)		Report		Stadium: Sportpark Ronhof; Attendance: 0 Referee: Michael Bacher

21 June 2020 33	VfL Bochum	2–2	SpVgg Greuther Fürth	Bochum
15:30 CEST (UTC+2)	Tesche 42'; Osei-Tutu 52'	Report	Hrgota 7'; Ernst 79'	Stadium: Vonovia Ruhrstadion; Attendance: 0 Referee: Martin Petersen

28 June 2020 34	SpVgg Greuther Furth	1–2	Karlsruher SC	Fürth
15:30 CEST (UTC+2)	Keita-Ruel 2'	Report	Kother 21'; Hofmann 61' (pen.)	Stadium: Sportpark Ronhof; Attendance: 0 Referee: Marco Fritz

=== DFB-Pokal ===
11 August 2019 First round	MSV Duisburg	2–0 (a.e.t.)	SpVgg Greuther Fürth	Duisburg
15:30 CEST (UTC+2)	Daschner 4'; Albutat 14'			Stadium: Schaunisland-Reisen-Arena; Attendance: 13,542; Referee: Christian Dingert
