= Max Christiansen =

German footballer (born 1996)

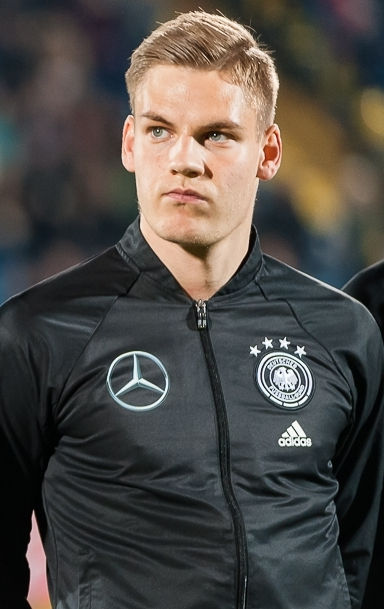
- Christiansen with Germany U21 in 2016

Personal information
- Date of birth: 25 September 1996 (age 30)
- Place of birth: Flensburg, Germany
- Height: 1.88 m (6 ft 2 in)
- Position: Midfielder

Team information
- Current team: SV Sandhausen
- Number: 26

Youth career
- SV Adelby
- –2010: Flensburg 08
- 2010–2011: Holstein Kiel
- 2011–2014: Hansa Rostock

Senior career*
Years	Team	Apps	(Gls)
2014–2015	Hansa Rostock	24	(1)
2015–2018	FC Ingolstadt II	8	(1)
2015–2018	FC Ingolstadt	50	(1)
2018–2019	Arminia Bielefeld	7	(0)
2019–2021	Waldhof Mannheim	54	(3)
2021–2023	Greuther Fürth	58	(0)
2023–2025	Hannover 96	35	(1)
2025–2026	1860 Munich	16	(2)
2026–	SV Sandhausen	5	(0)

International career^{‡}
2012–2013	Germany U17	4	(0)
2014–2015	Germany U19	13	(3)
2015–2016	Germany U20	6	(0)
2016	Germany U21	3	(0)
2016	Germany Olympic	2	(0)
Medal record
Olympic Games
Silver medal – second place	2016 Rio de Janeiro	Team
- * Club domestic league appearances and goals as of 24 September 2026 ‡ National team caps and goals as of 14:21, 11 July 2019 (UTC)

Max Christiansen (born 25 September 1996) is a German professional footballer who plays as a midfielder for Regionalliga Südwest club SV Sandhausen.

== Club career ==
A Flensburg native, Christiansen started playing football with local sides SV Adelby and Flensburg 08. In 2010, at the age of 13, he moved to the youth ranks of Holstein Kiel where he stayed only one year, though. He joined the football academy of Hansa Rostock, this included attending a private school.

Subsequently, he made his way through Rostock's youth teams and eventually got promoted to the first team, playing then in 3. Liga. He debuted on 29 March 2014 in a home match against Stuttgarter Kickers, playing 80 minutes as a starter. In the following Christiansen became a regular and attracted the attention of several top- and second-flight clubs.

In the next winter break, 2014–15, Rostock faced massive financial difficulties and had to acquire income through selling players. Christiansen moved to 2. Bundesliga club FC Ingolstadt for a transfer fee of believed to be €500,000 and signed a three-and-a-half-year contract until 2018.

Shortly after the end of the 2020–21 season Greuther Fürth, newly promoted to the Bundesliga, announced the signing of Christiansen for the 2021–22 season. He joined on a free transfer and signed a contract until 2023.

Christiansen joined Hannover 96 ahead of the 2023–24 season on a two-year contract. He moved to 1860 Munich ahead of the 2025–26 season.

== International career ==
Christiansen was captain of the Germany U20 team and earned six caps. Previously he also was capped for the U19 and U17 teams.

He was part of the squad for the 2016 Summer Olympics, where Germany won the silver medal.

== Career statistics ==
=== Club ===
As of 1 July 2025

Appearances and goals by club, season and competition
Club	Season	League			National cup		Total	
Club	Season	Division	Apps	Goals	Apps	Goals	Apps	Goals
Hansa Rostock	2013–14	3. Liga	7	1	—		7	1
Hansa Rostock	2014–15	3. Liga	17	0	—		17	0
Hansa Rostock	Total		24	1	—		24	1
FC Ingolstadt II	2014–15	Regionalliga Bayern	2	0	—		2	0
FC Ingolstadt II	2015–16	Regionalliga Bayern	3	0	—		3	0
FC Ingolstadt II	2016–17	Regionalliga Bayern	2	0	—		2	0
FC Ingolstadt II	2017–18	Regionalliga Bayern	1	1	—		1	1
FC Ingolstadt II	Total		8	1	—		8	1
FC Ingolstadt	2014–15	2. Bundesliga	4	1	—		4	1
FC Ingolstadt	2015–16	Bundesliga	19	0	1	0	20	0
FC Ingolstadt	2016–17	Bundesliga	11	0	1	0	12	0
FC Ingolstadt	2017–18	2. Bundesliga	16	0	1	0	17	0
FC Ingolstadt	Total		50	1	3	0	53	1
Arminia Bielefeld	2018–19	2. Bundesliga	7	0	2	0	9	0
Waldhof Mannheim	2019–20	3. Liga	29	2	1	0	30	2
Waldhof Mannheim	2020–21	3. Liga	25	1	—		25	1
Waldhof Mannheim	Total		54	3	1	0	55	3
Greuther Fürth	2021–22	Bundesliga	27	0	0	0	27	0
Greuther Fürth	2022–23	2. Bundesliga	31	0	1	0	32	0
Greuther Fürth	Total		58	0	1	0	59	0
Hannover 96	2023–24	2. Bundesliga	19	0	1	0	20	0
Hannover 96	2024–25	2. Bundesliga	16	1	1	0	17	1
Hannover 96	Total		35	1	2	0	37	1
1860 Munich	2025–26	3. Liga	0	0	—		0	0
Career total			236	7	9	0	245	7

== Honours ==
FC Ingolstadt

- 2. Bundesliga: 2014–15

Germany

- Summer Olympic Games: Silver Medal 2016
