= Julian Green =

American soccer player (born 1995)

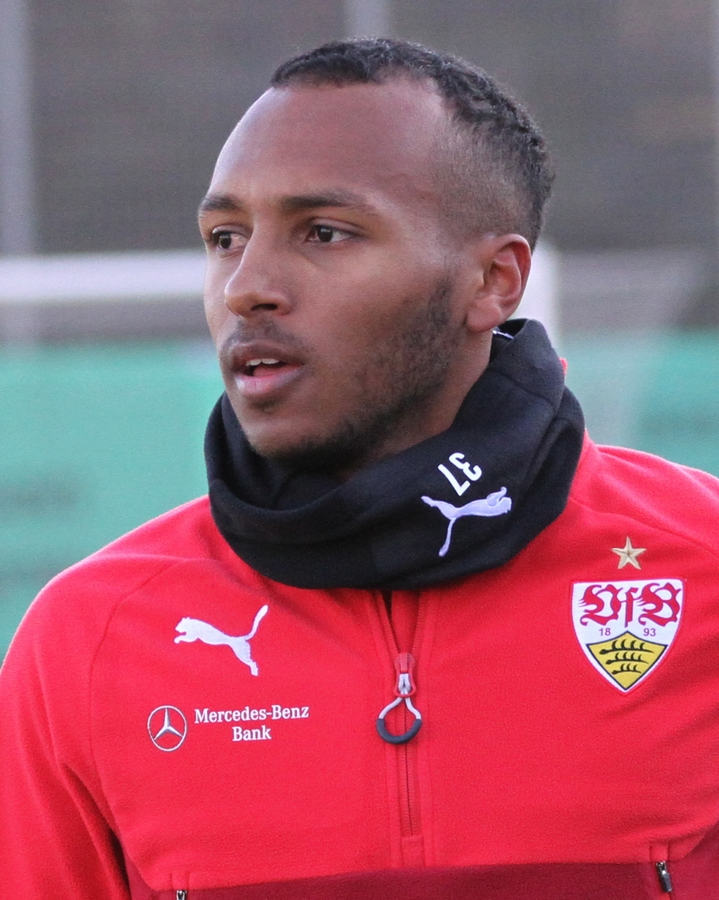
- Green training with VfB Stuttgart in 2017

Personal information
- Full name: Julian Wesley Green
- Date of birth: June 6, 1995 (age 31)
- Place of birth: Tampa, Florida, United States
- Height: 5 ft 8 in (1.73 m)
- Position: Midfielder

Youth career
- FC Miesbach
- 2006–2009: SG Hausham
- 2010–2013: Bayern Munich

Senior career*
Years	Team	Apps	(Gls)
2013–2016	Bayern Munich II	51	(25)
2013–2016	Bayern Munich	0	(0)
2014–2015	→ Hamburger SV (loan)	5	(0)
2015	→ Hamburger SV II (loan)	1	(0)
2017–2018	VfB Stuttgart	10	(1)
2017–2018	→ Greuther Fürth (loan)	24	(3)
2018–2026	Greuther Fürth	210	(35)

International career^{‡}
2011	Germany U16	4	(1)
2011	Germany U17	2	(0)
2012	United States U18	1	(1)
2013	Germany U19	5	(0)
2015–2016	United States U23	5	(1)
2014–2018	United States	15	(4)
- * Club domestic league appearances and goals as of May 18, 2026 ‡ National team caps and goals as of November 15, 2018

Julian Wesley Green (born June 6, 1995) is an American professional soccer player who plays as a midfielder.

He began his professional career at Bayern Munich and was part of their squad that won the 2013 FIFA Club World Cup. After making four competitive appearances for Bayern, scoring once and having a loan at Hamburger SV, he moved to VfB Stuttgart in January 2017, winning the 2. Bundesliga in his first season. He spent the 2017–18 2. Bundesliga season on loan at Greuther Fürth before signing for them permanently in the summer of 2018.

Green represented both Germany and the United States at youth international level. He made his senior international debut for the United States in March 2014 and was selected for the 2014 FIFA World Cup, where he became the youngest American to score a goal in the competition and the youngest player to score in the 2014 tournament.

== Club career ==
=== Bayern Munich ===
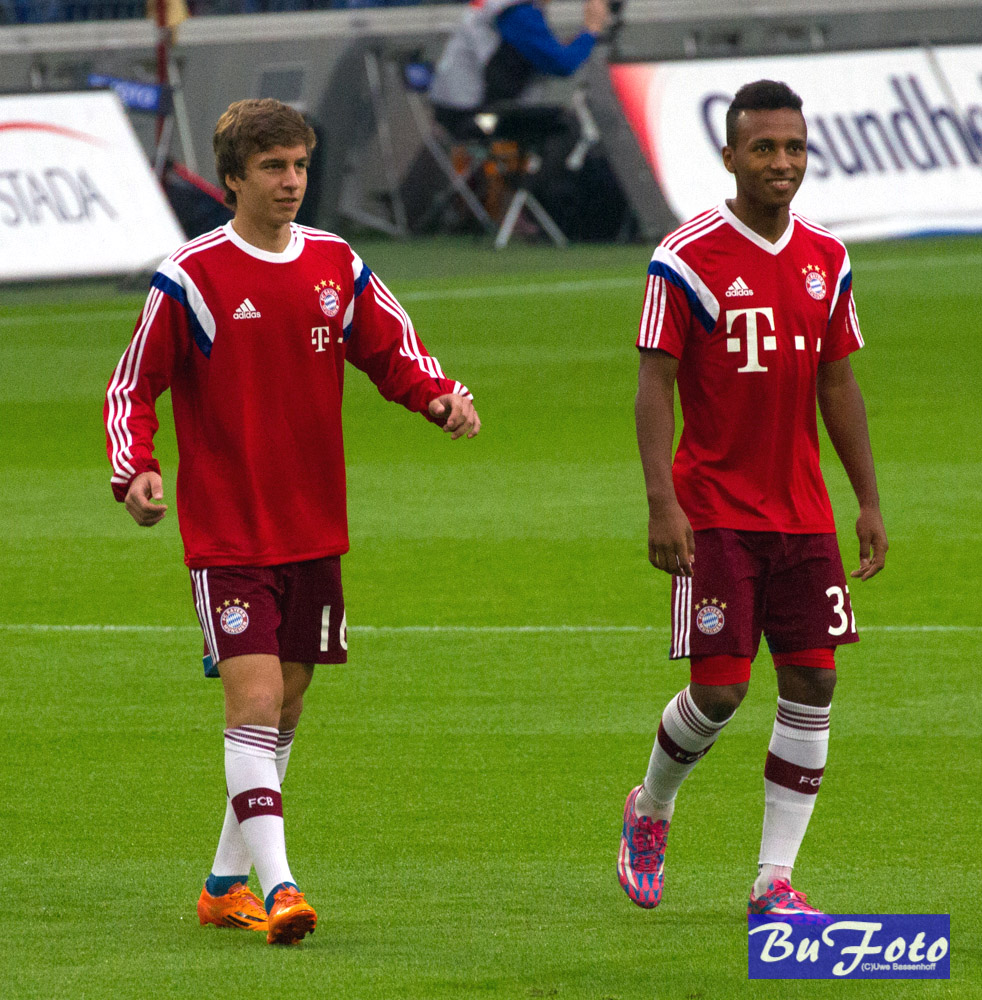
Green (right) with Gianluca Gaudino in 2014

On November 8, 2013, Green signed a professional contract with Bayern Munich to stay at the club until 2017. Green made his professional debut on November 27, 2013, coming on in the 88th minute of a UEFA Champions League game against CSKA Moscow as a substitute for Mario Götze. He was named in Bayern's squad for the 2013 FIFA Club World Cup, as a late replacement for the injured Arjen Robben. He finished the 2013–14 season with an appearance in the UEFA Champions League and 15 goals in 23 appearances for the reserve team. Green was listed as a member of the first team for the 2014–15 season.

==== Loan to Hamburger SV ====
On September 1, 2014, it was announced that Green would be on loan with Hamburger SV for the 2014–15 season.

In February 2015, the German newspaper Bild reported that Green had been demoted to Hamburger SV II, HSV's reserve side that plays in the fourth tier of German soccer. Green, who had been limited to 113 first-team minutes all season, denied the report and the club press officer said he would play with HSV II "a couple times when he is not in the first-team squad" to get more game action and match fitness, but that he was still training with the first team.

==== Return to Bayern ====
On August 20, 2015, Green was demoted to FC Bayern Munich II. He made his first appearance of the season the next day, playing right back against SV Schalding-Heining. On October 23, he scored a hat-trick against FC Augsburg II. Green started a Champions League match for Bayern Munich against Dinamo Zagreb in December, playing 62 minutes. It marked his first appearance with the first team in over two years.

Green returned to the first-team after new manager, Carlo Ancelotti, included him in the preseason squad. During the second game of their U.S. tour, Green scored a hat-trick in the first 35 minutes, helping Munich to a 4–1 win over Inter Milan. Following an international break in which Green scored two goals in two successive matches, Ancelotti hinted that the player could be receiving a "chance to play in the next few games". That chance came on October 26, 2016, when Green scored his first competitive goal for Bayern, coming against FC Augsburg in a 3–1 victory in the second round of the DFB-Pokal, making him the first American to score for the club. To that point in the season, despite being regularly named to the squad for Bundesliga matches, Green had only made a substitute appearance in the Pokal, against first round opponent Carl Zeiss Jena.

=== VfB Stuttgart ===
On December 21, 2016, Green moved to 2. Bundesliga club VfB Stuttgart on a two-and-a-half-year contract for an undisclosed fee, effective January 1. He made his debut on January 29, playing the first half of a 1–0 win at FC St. Pauli before being substituted for Carlos Mané, and eight days later he scored his first goal in a 2–0 home win over Fortuna Düsseldorf. He finished the season with ten appearances, and his team won the league title.

=== Greuther Fürth ===
On August 31, 2017, Green was loaned out to SpVgg Greuther Fürth in the second division until the end of the season. On May 13, 2018, he scored the goal which saved the team from relegation to the 3. Liga in a 1–1 draw against 1. FC Heidenheim and finished out of the relegation playoff position on goal difference. He finished the 2017–18 season with three goals in 24 appearances.

Green stayed with Greuther Fürth following the expiry of his loan, signing permanently for the club on June 17, 2018, inking a two-year contract.

On August 12, 2023, in a first round match in the 2023–24 DFB-Pokal, Green was racially abused while playing against Hallescher FC in Halle, Germany.

== International career ==
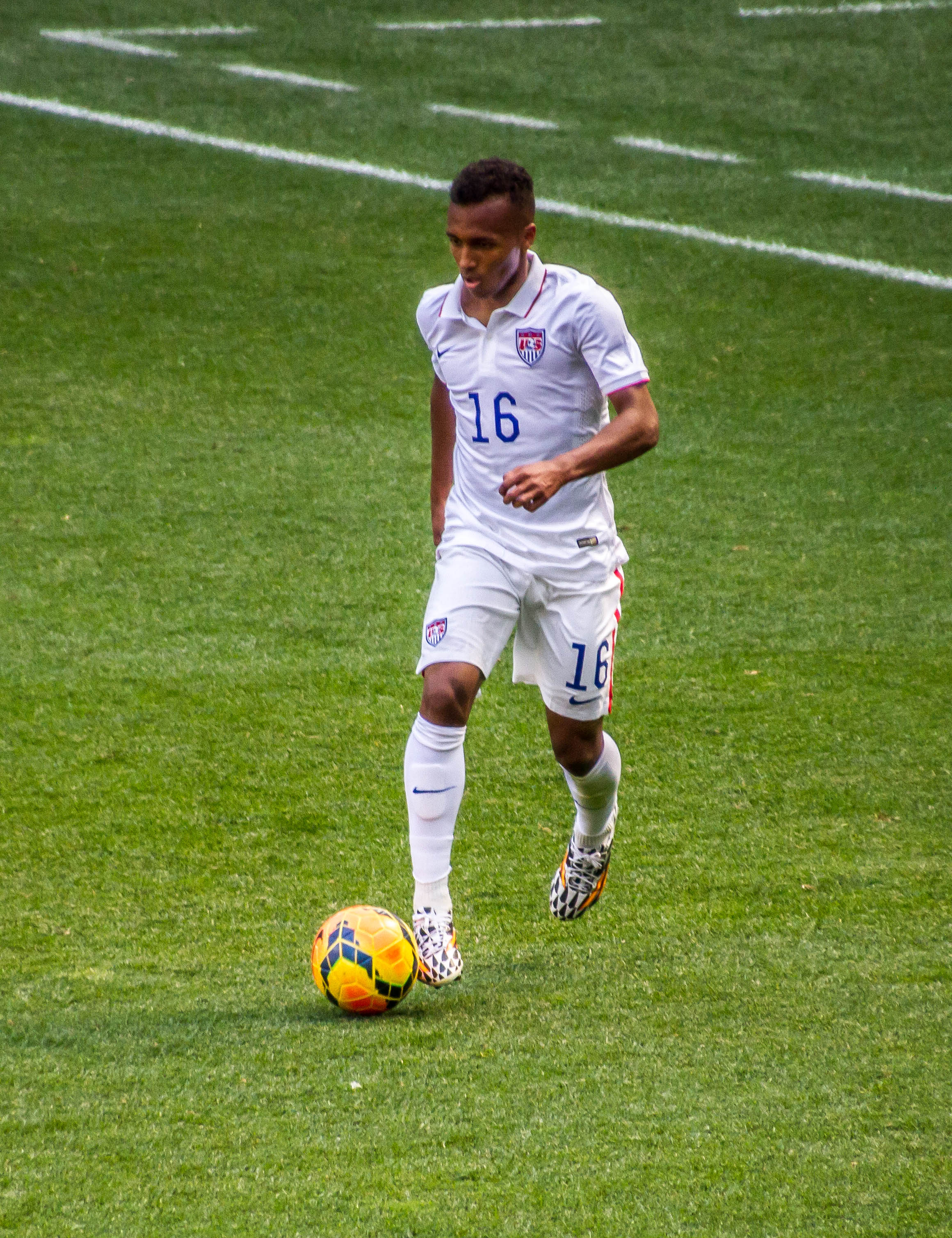
Green playing for the United States in 2014

=== Youth ===
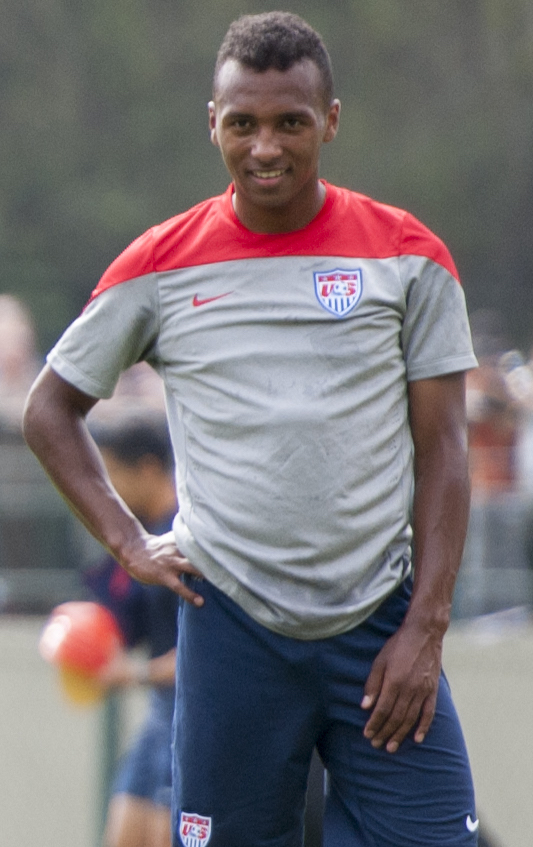
Green training with the US in 2014

Green was born in Tampa, Florida, United States to an American father and German mother. His mother moved back with him to Germany when he was two years old. Eligible to play for either the United States or German national teams, he was sought after by both federations.

His international career began with Germany U16s and U17s. In September 2012, Green represented the United States at the U18 level in an international friendly with Netherlands, scoring in a 4–2 victory.

Green represented Germany at the U19 level and featured in the qualifying round of the 2014 UEFA European Under-19 Championship.

Green was called up to the United States senior team by head coach Jürgen Klinsmann for friendlies in November 2013, but he declined the call due to being ineligible to play unless a one-time switch—allowed for players with dual nationalities—was filed, something he said he was not ready to do. Instead he joined the German U19 team for a friendly against France.

=== U.S. men's team ===
Green trained with the United States ahead of their match against Ukraine on March 5, 2014, and filed for a one-time switch to play for the country on March 18. Prior to his senior international appearance, Green played internationally for Germany and the United States at various youth levels due to having dual citizenship. Explaining his decision to play for the United States, Green said, "I was born in Florida and my father still lives there, so I have deep roots in the U.S. I'm very proud to be representing the United States." On March 24, FIFA approved Green's change of association, making him eligible to play in games for the United States. Two days later, he received his first call up for the senior national team for a friendly in April against Mexico, and made his debut in the second half of the 2–2 draw at the University of Phoenix Stadium.

Green was selected as a part of the United States men's national team on May 12, 2014, to train for the 2014 FIFA World Cup in Brazil. He was named to the final 23-man squad on May 22. On July 1, Green became the youngest player in United States history to score in the World Cup, scoring with a volley in the 107th minute with his first touch of the ball, less than two minutes into his debut game against Belgium in the round of 16. With the goal, he became the youngest player to score at that World Cup.

== Career statistics ==
=== Club ===
As of matches played December 21, 2024

Appearances and goals by club, season and competition
Club	Season	League			DFB-Pokal		Europe		Total	
Club	Season	Division	Apps	Goals	Apps	Goals	Apps	Goals	Apps	Goals
Bayern Munich	2013–14	Bundesliga	0	0	0	0	1 (Note: Appearance in UEFA Champions League)	0	1	0
Bayern Munich	2015–16	Bundesliga	0	0	0	0	1	0	1	0
Bayern Munich	2016–17	Bundesliga	0	0	2	1	0	0	2	1
Bayern Munich	Total		0	0	2	1	2	0	4	1
Bayern Munich II	2013–14	Regionalliga Bayern	23	15	—		—		23	15
Bayern Munich II	2015–16	Regionalliga Bayern	28	10	—		—		28	10
Bayern Munich II	Total		51	25	—		—		51	25
Hamburger SV (loan)	2014–15	Bundesliga	5	0	0	0	—		5	0
Hamburger SV II (loan)	2014–15	Regionalliga Nord	1	0	—		—		1	0
VfB Stuttgart	2016–17	2. Bundesliga	10	1	0	0	—		10	1
Greuther Fürth (loan)	2017–18	2. Bundesliga	24	3	0	0	—		24	3
Greuther Fürth	2018–19	2. Bundesliga	29	4	1	0	—		30	4
Greuther Fürth	2019–20	2. Bundesliga	23	4	1	0	—		24	4
Greuther Fürth	2020–21	2. Bundesliga	30	9	3	1	—		33	10
Greuther Fürth	2021–22	Bundesliga	24	0	1	1	—		25	1
Greuther Fürth	2022–23	2. Bundesliga	28	7	1	0	—		29	7
Greuther Fürth	2023–24	2. Bundesliga	25	4	2	0	—		27	4
Greuther Fürth	2024–25	2. Bundesliga	17	5	2	0	—		19	5
Greuther Fürth	Total		176	33	11	2	—		187	35
Career total			267	62	13	3	2	0	282	65

=== International ===
As of match played November 15, 2018

Appearances and goals by national team and year
National team	Year	Apps	Goals
United States	2014	5	1
United States	2015	0	0
United States	2016	3	2
United States	2017	0	0
United States	2018	7	1
United States	Total	15	4

As of match played June 9, 2018. Score and result lists United States' goals first.

List of international goals scored by Julian Green
No.	Date	Venue	Opponent	Score	Result	Competition
1.	July 1, 2014	Arena Fonte Nova, Salvador, Brazil	Belgium	1–2	1–2 (a.e.t.)	2014 FIFA World Cup
2.	October 7, 2016	Estadio Pedro Marrero, Havana, Cuba	Cuba	2–0	2–0	Friendly
3.	October 11, 2016	Robert F. Kennedy Memorial Stadium, Washington, D.C., United States	New Zealand	1–0	1–1	Friendly
4.	June 9, 2018	Parc Olympique Lyonnais, Lyon, France	France	1–0	1–1	Friendly

== Honors ==
Bayern Munich

- DFL-Supercup: 2016
- FIFA Club World Cup: 2013

VfB Stuttgart

- 2. Bundesliga: 2016–17
