= Håvard Nielsen =

Norwegian footballer (born 1993)

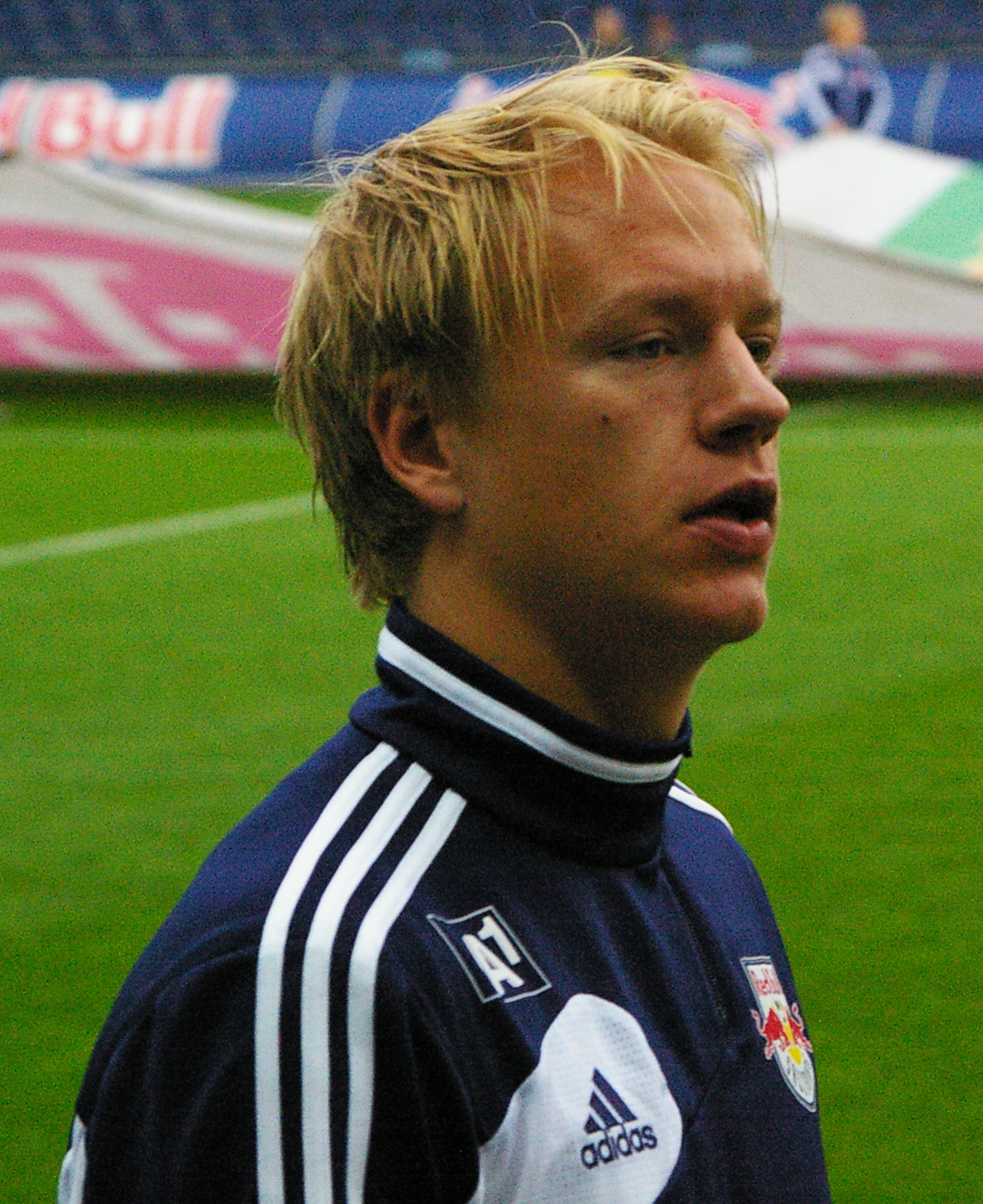
- Nielsen with Red Bull Salzburg in 2012

Personal information
- Full name: Håvard Kallevik Nielsen
- Date of birth: 15 July 1993 (age 33)
- Place of birth: Oslo, Norway
- Height: 1.87 m (6 ft 2 in)
- Positions: Striker; winger

Team information
- Current team: Vålerenga

Youth career
- 2000–2006: Oppsal
- 2007–2010: Vålerenga

Senior career*
Years	Team	Apps	(Gls)
2009–2012	Vålerenga	46	(9)
2012–2016	Red Bull Salzburg	39	(3)
2014–2015	→ Eintracht Braunschweig (loan)	46	(10)
2016–2017	SC Freiburg	11	(0)
2017–2019	Fortuna Düsseldorf	23	(0)
2019	Fortuna Düsseldorf II	1	(1)
2019	→ MSV Duisburg (loan)	16	(4)
2019–2022	Greuther Fürth	91	(20)
2022–2026	Hannover 96	101	(17)
2026–	Vålerenga	1	(0)

International career^{‡}
2008	Norway U15	4	(0)
2009	Norway U16	10	(7)
2010	Norway U17	8	(2)
2010–2011	Norway U18	15	(3)
2011–2012	Norway U19	15	(4)
2012–2013	Norway U21	15	(3)
2012–2015	Norway	14	(2)
- * Club domestic league appearances and goals as of 12 September 2026 ‡ National team caps and goals as of 2020

Håvard Nielsen (born 15 July 1993) is a Norwegian professional footballer who plays as a forward for Eliteserien club Vålerenga. He played for the Norway national team.

== Club career ==
Born in the Norwegian capital, Oslo, Nielsen grew up in the outer-city neighborhood of Oppsal. He began his career with the local club Oppsal IF, but signed for Vålerenga in 2007, when he was 14 years old.

On 5 October 2009, he made his debut in the Norwegian Premier League against Viking as the youngest ever Vålerenga player. In January 2011, he signed a three-year professional contract with Vålerenga.

At the age of 18, Nielsen was already an experienced player and on 11 July 2012, he scored his first hat-trick for Vålerenga in the match against Odd Grenland.

In July 2012, he signed a deal with Red Bull Salzburg. In January 2014, he went on loan to the German Bundesliga side Eintracht Braunschweig. On 26 January 2014 he made his debut in the German first tier, in a game against Werder Bremen. The loan deal ended in June 2015 when he returned to Salzburg.

In winter 2015 Nielsen moved to SC Freiburg.

In July 2017, after 1.5 seasons at Freiburg, Nielsen signed a three-year contract with 2. Bundesliga side Fortuna Düsseldorf.

He was loaned to MSV Duisburg on 8 January 2019.

On 26 July 2019, Nielsen joined 2. Bundesliga side Greuther Fürth, signing a two-year contract.

Ahead of the 2022–23 season, Nielsen joined 2. Bundesliga club Hannover 96 on a two-year contract. He left the club in 2026.

== International career ==
Nielsen has played for a national team above his age since he was 16. He played all matches during the 2011 European Under-19 Championship qualification and scored one goal, when Norway advanced to the elite qualification.

Nielsen made his debut for the senior Norwegian national team in 2012 as a teenager and since then he has played 11 times for the Norway national team and he is now a regular for Norway. He scored his first international goal for Norway at only 19 years of age, in November 2012, against Hungary in a friendly match. He scored his second goal for Norway in October 2014, in a European Championship qualifier against Bulgaria.

== Career statistics ==
=== Club ===
As of match played 12 September 2026

Appearances and goals by club, season and competition
Club	Season	League			National Cup		Continental		Total	
Club	Season	Division	Apps	Goals	Apps	Goals	Apps	Goals	Apps	Goals
Vålerenga	2009	Tippeligaen	1	0	0	0	–		1	0
Vålerenga	2010	Tippeligaen	1	0	1	1	–		2	1
Vålerenga	2011	Tippeligaen	28	3	1	0	4	0	33	3
Vålerenga	2012	Tippeligaen	16	6	2	1	–		18	7
Vålerenga	Total		46	9	4	2	4	0	52	11
Red Bull Salzburg	2012–13	Austrian Bundesliga	24	3	0	0	–		24	3
Red Bull Salzburg	2013–14	Austrian Bundesliga	7	0	0	0	4	0	11	0
Red Bull Salzburg	2014–15	Austrian Bundesliga	0	0	0	0	–		0	0
Red Bull Salzburg	2015–16	Austrian Bundesliga	8	0	0	0	1	0	9	0
Red Bull Salzburg	Total		39	3	0	0	5	0	43	3
Eintracht Braunschweig (loan)	2013–14	Bundesliga	16	2	0	0	–		16	2
Eintracht Braunschweig (loan)	2014–15	2. Bundesliga	30	8	2	2	–		32	10
Eintracht Braunschweig (loan)	Total		46	10	2	2	–		48	12
SC Freiburg	2015–16	2. Bundesliga	7	0	0	0	–		7	0
SC Freiburg	2016–17	2. Bundesliga	4	0	0	0	–		4	0
SC Freiburg	Total		11	0	0	0	–		11	0
Fortuna Düsseldorf	2017–18	2. Bundesliga	23	0	0	0	–		23	0
Fortuna Düsseldorf	2018–19	Bundesliga	0	0	1	0	–		1	0
Fortuna Düsseldorf	Total		23	0	1	0	–		24	0
MSV Duisburg (loan)	2018–19	2. Bundesliga	16	4	1	0	–		17	4
Greuther Fürth	2019–20	2. Bundesliga	31	7	1	0	–		32	7
Greuther Fürth	2020–21	2. Bundesliga	34	11	3	0	–		36	11
Greuther Fürth	2021–22	Bundesliga	26	2	0	0	–		26	2
Greuther Fürth	Total		91	20	4	0	–		95	20
Hannover 96	2022–23	2. Bundesliga	33	8	2	0	–		35	8
Hannover 96	2023–24	2. Bundesliga	27	7	0	0	–		27	7
Hannover 96	2024–25	2. Bundesliga	31	2	1	0	–		32	2
Hannover 96	2025–26	2. Bundesliga	10	0	0	0	–		10	0
Hannover 96	Total		101	17	3	0	–		104	17
Vålerenga	2026	Eliteserien	1	0	0	0	–		1	0
Career total			374	63	15	2	9	0	398	65

=== International ===
Scores and results list Norway's goal tally first, score column indicates score after each Nielsen goal.

List of international goals scored by Håvard Nielsen
No.	Date	Venue	Opponent	Score	Result	Competition
1	14 November 2012	Ferenc Puskás Stadium, Budapest, Hungary	Hungary	1–0	2–0	Friendly
2	13 October 2014	Ullevaal Stadion, Oslo, Norway	Bulgaria	2–1	2–1	UEFA Euro 2016 qualifying
