= Maximilian Bauer (footballer, born 2000) =

German footballer

Personal information
- Date of birth: 9 February 2000 (age 26)
- Place of birth: Windorf, Germany
- Height: 1.89 m (6 ft 2 in)
- Positions: Centre-back; right-back

Team information
- Current team: Arminia Bielefeld
- Number: 5

Youth career
- –2014: Grün-Weiss Deggendorf
- 2014–2018: Greuther Fürth

Senior career*
Years	Team	Apps	(Gls)
2018–2019	Greuther Fürth II	16	(1)
2018–2022	Greuther Fürth	70	(2)
2022–2026	Augsburg	52	(1)
2025	→ 1. FC Kaiserslautern (loan)	11	(0)
2025–2026	Augsburg II	10	(1)
2026	→ Arminia Bielefeld (loan)	17	(1)
2026–	Arminia Bielefeld	0	(0)

International career^{‡}
2018	Germany U18	1	(0)
2018–2019	Germany U19	4	(1)
2021–2023	Germany U21	7	(0)
- * Club domestic league appearances and goals as of 18 May 2026 ‡ National team caps and goals as of 20:14, 19 November 2022 (UTC)

Maximilian Bauer (born 9 February 2000) is a German professional footballer who plays as a centre-back or right-back for 2. Bundesliga club Arminia Bielefeld.

== Club career ==
On 2 February 2022, Bauer signed a five-year contract with FC Augsburg, effective from 1 July 2022. On 27 January 2025, Bauer was loaned by 1. FC Kaiserslautern in 2. Bundesliga. On 4 January 2026, Bauer was loaned by Arminia Bielefeld.

On 25 May 2026, Bauer moved to Arminia Bielefeld on a permanent basis.

== Career statistics ==
As of match played 12 January 2025

Appearances and goals by club, season and competition
Club	Season	League			Cup		Europe		Total	
Club	Season	Division	Apps	Goals	Apps	Goals	Apps	Goals	Apps	Goals
Greuther Fürth II	2018–19	Regionalliga Bayern	14	1	—		—		14	1
Greuther Fürth II	2020–21	Regionalliga Bayern	2	0	—		—		2	0
Greuther Fürth II	Total		16	1	—		—		16	1
Greuther Fürth	2018–19	2. Bundesliga	7	0	1	0	—		8	0
Greuther Fürth	2019–20	2. Bundesliga	8	0	0	0	—		8	0
Greuther Fürth	2020–21	2. Bundesliga	29	2	3	0	—		32	2
Greuther Fürth	2021–22	Bundesliga	26	0	1	0	—		27	0
Greuther Fürth	Total		70	2	5	0	—		75	2
Augsburg	2022–23	Bundesliga	27	0	2	0	—		29	0
Augsburg	2023–24	Bundesliga	14	1	0	0	—		14	1
Augsburg	2024–25	Bundesliga	11	0	1	0	—		12	0
Augsburg	Total		52	1	3	0	0	0	55	1
Career total			138	4	8	0	0	0	146	4
