= Marius Funk =

German footballer

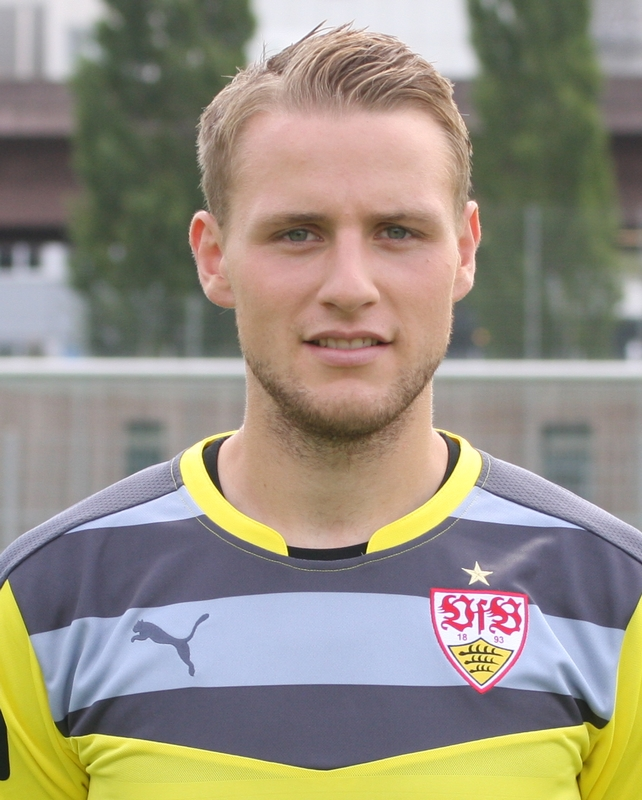
- Funk with VfB Stuttgart in 2015

Personal information
- Date of birth: 1 January 1996 (age 30)
- Place of birth: Aalen, Germany
- Height: 1.87 m (6 ft 2 in)
- Position: Goalkeeper

Team information
- Current team: VfB Stuttgart
- Number: 33

Youth career
- 2000–2009: FV 08 Unterkochen
- 2009–2010: 1. FC Heidenheim
- 2010–2015: VfB Stuttgart

Senior career*
| Years | Team | Apps | (Gls) |
| 2015–2016 | VfB Stuttgart II | 7 | (0) |
| 2016–2022 | Greuther Fürth | 13 | (0) |
| 2016–2020 | → Greuther Fürth II | 39 | (0) |
| 2022–2025 | FC Ingolstadt | 95 | (0) |
| 2025–2026 | Energie Cottbus | 34 | (0) |
| 2026– | VfB Stuttgart | 0 | (0) |

International career^{‡}
| 2010 | Germany U15 | 1 | (0) |
| 2012–2013 | Germany U17 | 7 | (0) |
| 2013–2014 | Germany U18 | 2 | (0) |
| 2014–2015 | Germany U19 | 10 | (0) |
- * Club domestic league appearances and goals as of 28 May 2026 ‡ National team caps and goals as of 08:17, 20 August 2020 (UTC)

Marius Funk (born 1 January 1996) is a German professional footballer who plays as a goalkeeper for Bundesliga club VfB Stuttgart.

== Club career ==
In April 2014 Marius Funk extended his contract with VfB Stuttgart until 2017. He made his debut for VfB Stuttgart II on 25 July 2015 in the 3. Liga against Dynamo Dresden.

On 21 May 2022, Funk signed with FC Ingolstadt. On 4 September 2025, Funk joined Energie Cottbus. On 25 May 2026, he returned to VfB Stuttgart, signing a contract until 2028.

== International career ==
Funk was Germany's first choice goalkeeper at the 2015 UEFA European Under-19 Championship.

== Personal life ==
His brother, Patrick Funk, is also a professional footballer.

== Career statistics ==
As of match played 16 May 2026

Appearances and goals by club, season and competition
| Club | Season | League | | | Cup | | Europe | | Other | | Total | |
| Club | Season | Division | Apps | Goals | Apps | Goals | Apps | Goals | Apps | Goals | Apps | Goals |
|---|---|---|---|---|---|---|---|---|---|---|---|---|
| VfB Stuttgart II | 2015–16 | 3. Liga | 7 | 0 | — | | — | | — | | 7 | 0 |
| Greuther Fürth | 2016–17 | 2. Bundesliga | 0 | 0 | 0 | 0 | — | | — | | 0 | 0 |
| Greuther Fürth | 2017–18 | 2. Bundesliga | 1 | 0 | 1 | 0 | — | | — | | 2 | 0 |
| Greuther Fürth | 2018–19 | 2. Bundesliga | 1 | 0 | 0 | 0 | — | | — | | 1 | 0 |
| Greuther Fürth | 2019–20 | 2. Bundesliga | 2 | 0 | 1 | 0 | — | | — | | 3 | 0 |
| Greuther Fürth | 2020–21 | 2. Bundesliga | 1 | 0 | 1 | 0 | — | | — | | 2 | 0 |
| Greuther Fürth | 2021–22 | 2. Bundesliga | 8 | 0 | 1 | 0 | — | | — | | 9 | 0 |
| Greuther Fürth | Total | | 13 | 0 | 4 | 0 | — | | — | | 17 | 0 |
| Greuther Fürth II | 2016–17 | Regionalliga Bayern | 19 | 0 | — | | — | | — | | 19 | 0 |
| Greuther Fürth II | 2017–18 | Regionalliga Bayern | 12 | 0 | — | | — | | — | | 12 | 0 |
| Greuther Fürth II | 2018–19 | Regionalliga Bayern | 5 | 0 | — | | — | | — | | 5 | 0 |
| Greuther Fürth II | 2020–21 | Regionalliga Bayern | 3 | 0 | — | | — | | — | | 3 | 0 |
| Greuther Fürth II | Total | | 39 | 0 | — | | — | | — | | 39 | 0 |
| Ingolstadt 04 | 2022–23 | 3. Liga | 36 | 0 | 0 | 0 | — | | 2 (Note: Appearances in Bavarian Cup) | 0 | 38 | 0 |
| Ingolstadt 04 | 2023–24 | 3. Liga | 38 | 0 | 0 | 0 | — | | 6 | 0 | 43 | 0 |
| Ingolstadt 04 | 2024–25 | 3. Liga | 21 | 0 | 0 | 0 | — | | 3 | 0 | 24 | 0 |
| Ingolstadt 04 | Total | | 95 | 0 | 0 | 0 | — | | 11 | 0 | 106 | 0 |
| Energie Cottbus | 2025–26 | 3. Liga | 34 | 0 | 1 | 0 | — | | 2 (Note: Appearances in Brandenburg Cup) | 0 | 37 | 0 |
| VfB Stuttgart | 2026–27 | Bundesliga | 0 | 0 | 0 | 0 | 0 | 0 | — | | 0 | 0 |
| Career total | | | 188 | 0 | 5 | 0 | 0 | 0 | 13 | 0 | 206 | 0 |
