= Paul Seguin =

German footballer (born 1995)

Personal information
- Date of birth: 29 March 1995 (age 31)
- Place of birth: Magdeburg, Germany
- Height: 1.85 m (6 ft 1 in)
- Position: Midfielder

Team information
- Current team: Hertha BSC
- Number: 30

Youth career
- 1999–2007: 1. FC Lok Stendal
- 2007–2014: VfL Wolfsburg

Senior career*
Years	Team	Apps	(Gls)
2014–2017	VfL Wolfsburg	26	(1)
2014–2018	VfL Wolfsburg II	41	(7)
2017–2018	→ Dynamo Dresden (loan)	23	(0)
2018–2019	→ Greuther Fürth (loan)	12	(2)
2019–2022	Greuther Fürth	92	(8)
2022–2023	Union Berlin	20	(1)
2023–2025	Schalke 04	55	(5)
2025–	Hertha BSC	36	(3)

International career
2016	Germany U21	1	(0)
- * Club domestic league appearances and goals as of 18 May 2026

Paul Seguin (born 29 March 1995) is a German professional footballer who plays as a midfielder for 2. Bundesliga club Hertha BSC.

== Club career ==
Born in Magdeburg, Seguin came through the academy system at 1. FC Lok Stendal in 1999. In 2007, he joined the VfL Wolfsburg Academy. He was called up the second team in 2014. He made his professional debut in the Regionalliga Nord on 24 August 2014 against Hamburger SV II and on 6 December 2014, he scored his first goal of his career against VfR Neumünster. He has played 36 games and scored 7 goals for VfL Wolfsburg II since 2014. On 4 March 2015, he made his debut for first team in DFB-Pokal against RB Leipzig. He played one minute after he replaced Kevin De Bruyne.

On 17 January 2019, Seguin was loaned out to Greuther Fürth for the rest of the season with an option to buy. On 7 May it was confirmed, that Greuther Fürth had decided to activate the option and he signed a three-year contract with the club.

On 21 June 2023, Seguin agreed to join Schalke 04, newly relegated from the Bundesliga, signing a three-year contract. On 18 June 2025, he agreed to a contract with Hertha BSC lasting until 2027.

== International career ==
Seguin made his Germany U21 debut in a 1–0 win over Turkey U21 on 10 November 2016.

== Career statistics ==
=== Club ===
As of match played 2 May 2025

Appearances and goals by club, season and competition
Club	Season	League			Cup		Other		Total	
Club	Season	Division	Apps	Goals	Apps	Goals	Apps	Goals	Apps	Goals
VfL Wolfsburg	2014–15	Bundesliga	0	0	1	0	—		1	0
VfL Wolfsburg	2015–16	Bundesliga	4	0	0	0	—		4	0
VfL Wolfsburg	2016–17	Bundesliga	22	1	2	0	—		24	1
VfL Wolfsburg	Total		26	1	3	0	—		29	1
VfL Wolfsburg II	2014–15	Regionalliga Nord	20	3	—		—		20	3
VfL Wolfsburg II	2015–16	Regionalliga Nord	20	4	—		2 (Note: Appearances in Promotion play-offs 3. Liga.)	0	22	4
VfL Wolfsburg II	2016–17	Regionalliga Nord	0	0	—		—		0	0
VfL Wolfsburg II	2017–18	Regionalliga Nord	1	0	—		—		1	0
VfL Wolfsburg II	Total		41	7	—		2	0	43	7
Dynamo Dresden (loan)	2017–18	2. Bundesliga	23	0	0	0	—		23	0
Greuther Fürth (loan)	2018–19	2. Bundesliga	12	2	—		—		12	2
Greuther Fürth	2019–20	2. Bundesliga	32	1	1	0	—		33	1
Greuther Fürth	2020–21	2. Bundesliga	33	7	3	0	—		36	7
Greuther Fürth	2021–22	Bundesliga	27	0	1	0	—		28	0
Greuther Fürth	Total		104	10	5	0	—		109	10
Union Berlin	2022–23	Bundesliga	20	1	3	0	—		23	1
Schalke 04	2023–24	2. Bundesliga	30	3	1	1	—		31	4
Schalke 04	2024–25	2. Bundesliga	25	2	1	0	—		26	2
Schalke 04	Total		55	5	2	1	—		57	6
Hertha BSC	2025-26	2. Bundesliga	25	1	3	0	—		28	1
Hertha BSC	2026-27	2. Bundesliga	11	2	2	1	—		13	3
Hertha BSC	Total		36	3	5	1	—		41	4
Career total			305	27	18	2	2	0	325	29

== Honours ==
VfL Wolfsburg

- DFB-Pokal: 2014–15
