= Sebastian Griesbeck =

German footballer

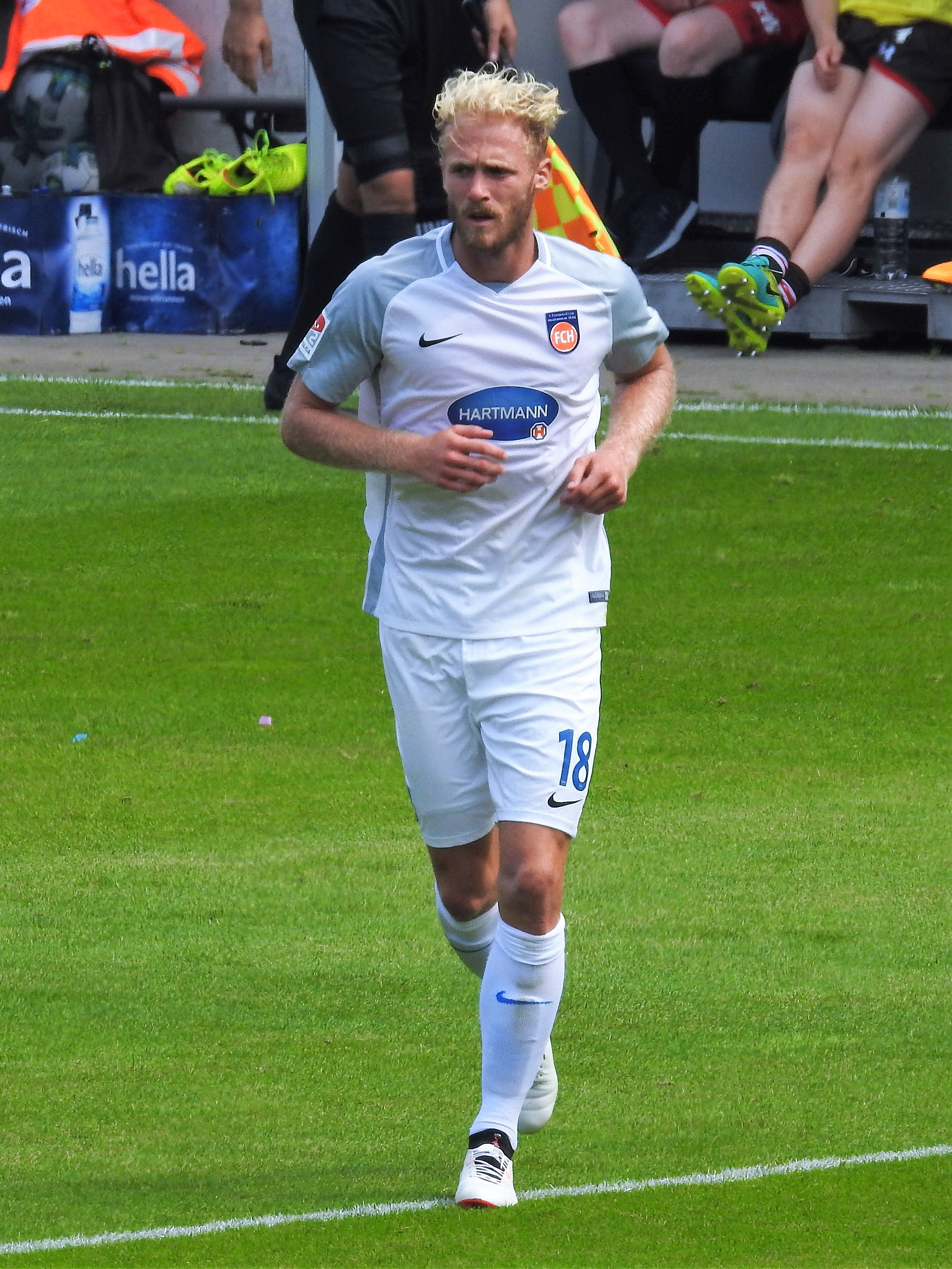
- Griesbeck playing for 1. FC Heidenheim in 2017

Personal information
- Date of birth: 3 October 1990 (age 36)
- Place of birth: Ulm, Germany
- Height: 1.89 m (6 ft 2 in)
- Position: Defensive midfielder

Team information
- Current team: Start
- Number: 13

Youth career
- 1995–2010: TV Wiblingen

Senior career*
Years	Team	Apps	(Gls)
2010–2013	SSV Ulm	88	(5)
2013–2020	1. FC Heidenheim	221	(10)
2020–2021	Union Berlin	25	(0)
2021–2023	Greuther Fürth	55	(1)
2023–2024	Eintracht Braunschweig	23	(0)
2024–	Start	34	(4)
- * Club domestic league appearances and goals as of 23 July 2026

Sebastian Griesbeck (born 3 October 1990) is a German professional footballer who plays as a defensive midfielder for Norwegian club Start.

== Career ==
Griesbeck played for 1. FC Heidenheim in the 2. Bundesliga before moving to Bundesliga club Union Berlin on a free transfer in July 2020.

In June 2023, Griesbeck signed for Eintracht Braunschweig on a one-year contract following two seasons with fellow 2. Bundesliga club Greuter Fürth.

On 15 August 2024, Griesbeck signed with Start in Norway until the end of 2025.

== Personal life ==
Griesbeck is in a relationship with Kathrin Hendrich.
