= Alexander Lungwitz =

German footballer (born 2000)

Personal information
- Date of birth: 4 August 2000 (age 26)
- Place of birth: Munich, Germany
- Height: 1.80 m (5 ft 11 in)
- Position: Left-back

Team information
- Current team: Pipinsried
- Number: 13

Youth career
- 2005–2012: TSV Eching
- 2012–2013: Eintracht Freising
- 2013–2019: Bayern Munich

Senior career*
Years	Team	Apps	(Gls)
2019–2021	Greuther Fürth II	16	(0)
2019–2021	Greuther Fürth	0	(0)
2020–2021	→ Bayern Munich II (loan)	17	(0)
2021–2022	Würzburger Kickers	19	(0)
2022–2023	FC St. Pauli II	22	(0)
2023–2024	SC Freiburg II	27	(1)
2025–	Pipinsried	12	(1)

International career^{‡}
2016–2017	Germany U17	5	(0)
2018–2019	Germany U19	6	(0)
- * Club domestic league appearances and goals as of 3 May 2025 ‡ National team caps and goals as of 26 September 2020

Alexander Lungwitz (born 4 August 2000) is a German footballer who plays as a left-back for Bayernliga club Pipinsried.

== Career ==
Lungwitz made his professional debut for Bayern Munich II in the 3. Liga on 26 September 2020, starting in the away match against SC Verl, which finished as a 3–0 loss.

On 10 June 2021, Lungwitz joined 3. Liga club Würzburger Kickers. The season ended with relegation to the Regionalliga Bayern and he left the club afterwards.

On 29 June 2023, Lungwitz moved to SC Freiburg II.

== Career statistics ==
As of match played 1 March 2024

Appearances and goals by club, season and competition
Club	Season	League			Cup		Other		Total	
Club	Season	Division	Apps	Goals	Apps	Goals	Apps	Goals	Apps	Goals
Greuther Fürth II	2019–20	Regionalliga Bayern	16	0	—		—		16	0
Greuther Fürth	2019–20	2. Bundesliga	0	0	0	0	0	0	0	0
Greuther Fürth	2020–21	2. Bundesliga	0	0	0	0	0	0	0	0
Greuther Fürth	Total		0	0	0	0	0	0	0	0
Bayern Munich II (loan)	2020–21	3. Liga	17	0	—		0	0	17	0
Würzburger Kickers	2021–22	3. Liga	19	0	1	0	4 (Note: Appearances in Bavarian Cup)	0	24	0
St. Pauli II	2022–23	Regionalliga Nord	22	0	—		—		22	0
SC Freiburg II	2023–24	3. Liga	17	0	—		—		17	0
Career total			91	0	1	0	4	0	96	0
