= Dickson Abiama =

Nigerian footballer (born 1998)

Personal information
- Date of birth: 3 November 1998 (age 28)
- Height: 1.84 m (6 ft 0 in)
- Position: Centre-forward

Team information
- Current team: Rot-Weiss Essen
- Number: 18

Youth career
- –2017: SpVgg Mögeldorf

Senior career*
Years	Team	Apps	(Gls)
2017–2018	SpVgg Mögeldorf	28	(27)
2018–2019	Quelle Fürth	34	(13)
2019–2020	SC Eltersdorf	21	(17)
2020–2024	Greuther Fürth	96	(13)
2024–2026	1. FC Kaiserslautern	28	(0)
2025	→ TSV 1860 Munich (loan)	16	(2)
2026	→ Rot-Weiss Essen (loan)	14	(6)
2026–	Rot-Weiss Essen	0	(0)
- * Club domestic league appearances and goals as of 20 May 2026

Dickson Abiama (born 3 November 1998) is a Nigerian professional footballer who plays as a centre-forward for German 3. Liga club Rot-Weiss Essen.

== Career ==
Abiama made his debut for Greuther Fürth in the first round of the 2020–21 DFB-Pokal on 12 September 2020, coming on as a substitute in the 72nd minute for Branimir Hrgota against fifth-division side RSV Meinerzhagen. He scored two goals in the 113th and 118th minutes to secure a 6–1 win for Fürth after extra time. He made his 2. Bundesliga debut the following week on 20 September, once against coming on as a substitute for Hrgota in the 89th minute of Fürth's home match against VfL Osnabrück, which finished as a 1–1 draw.

On 23 May 2021, on the final matchday of the 2. Bundesliga season, Abiama scored the winning goal in the 83rd minute of a 3–2 home victory versus Fortuna Düsseldorf, even as Greuther Fürth only had 10 men on the pitch. Abiama's winner would ultimately prove to be the decisive goal that secured Fürth automatic promotion to the Bundesliga for 2021–22, as the win against Düsseldorf elevated Fürth from third place in the division (the promotion play-off spot), to second.

On 2 January 2024, Abiama signed for fellow 2. Bundesliga club 1. FC Kaiserslautern. On 3 February 2025, he was loaned by TSV 1860 Munich in 3. Liga.

On 2 February 2026, Abiama joined 3. Liga club Rot-Weiss Essen on loan. On 21 July 2026, he returned to Rot-Weiss Essen on a permanent basis.
