= David Danko =

German footballer

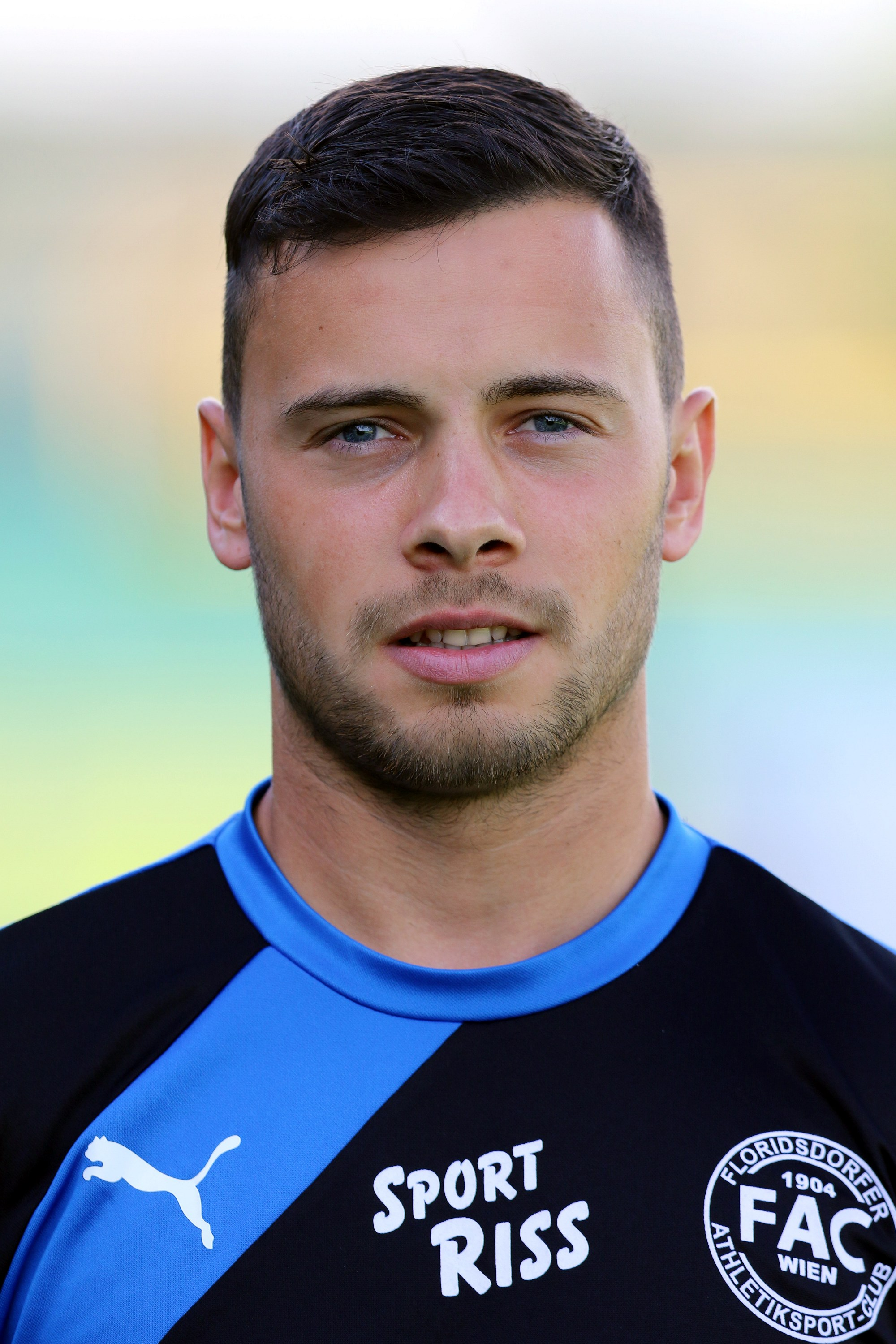
- Danko with Floridsdorfer AC in 2016

Personal information
- Date of birth: 16 November 1992 (age 33)
- Height: 1.76 m (5 ft 9 in)
- Position: Midfielder

Team information
- Current team: SV Tasmania Berlin
- Number: 18

Youth career
- Lichterfelder FC
- 2010–2011: SC Staaken

Senior career*
Years	Team	Apps	(Gls)
2011–2013	Lichterfelder FC	26	(1)
2013–2016	1. SC Sollenau	92	(2)
2016–2017	Floridsdorfer AC	14	(1)
2017–2018	Berliner AK 07	16	(1)
2018–2024	SV Babelsberg 03	133	(6)
2024–2025	Tennis Borussia Berlin	43	(10)
2026–	SV Tasmania Berlin	14	(2)
- * Club domestic league appearances and goals as of 23 September 2026

David Danko (born 16 November 1992) is a German footballer who plays as a midfielder for SV Tasmania Berlin.
