= Branimir Hrgota =

Swedish footballer

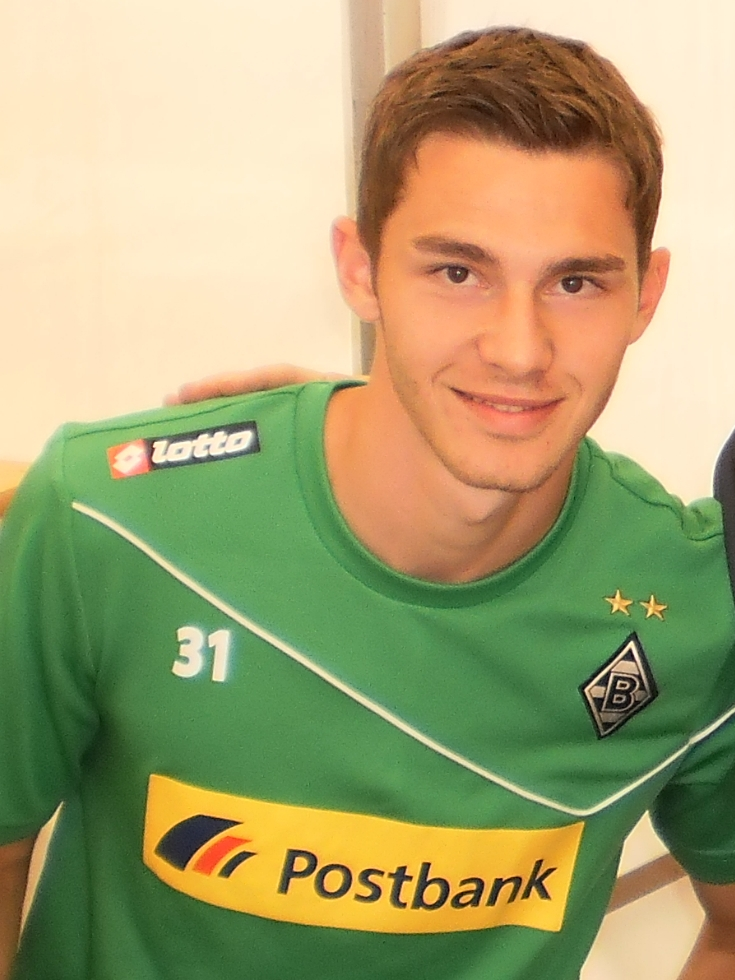
- Hrgota with Borussia Mönchengladbach in 2012

Personal information
- Date of birth: 12 January 1993 (age 33)
- Place of birth: Zenica, Bosnia and Herzegovina
- Height: 1.85 m (6 ft 1 in)
- Position: Forward

Team information
- Current team: St. Pauli
- Number: 10

Youth career
- –2008: IK Tord
- 2008–2011: Jönköpings Södra IF

Senior career*
Years	Team	Apps	(Gls)
2011–2012	Jönköpings Södra IF	39	(28)
2012–2013	Borussia Mönchengladbach II	8	(2)
2012–2016	Borussia Mönchengladbach	69	(7)
2016–2019	Eintracht Frankfurt	35	(5)
2019–2026	Greuther Fürth	229	(67)
2026–	St. Pauli	7	(0)

International career^{‡}
2011–2012	Sweden U19	9	(3)
2012–2015	Sweden U21	14	(3)
2014	Sweden	3	(0)
Medal record
Men's football
Representing Sweden
UEFA European Under-21 Championship
Winner	2015 Czech Republic
- * Club domestic league appearances and goals as of 23 October 2026 ‡ National team caps and goals as of 20:09, 16 March 2022 (UTC)

Branimir Hrgota (Croatian pronunciation: [branimir xr̩gota]; born 12 January 1993) is a professional footballer who plays as a striker for German 2. Bundesliga club St. Pauli. Born in Bosnia, he has played for the Sweden men's national football team.

== Club career ==
=== Jönköpings Södra IF ===
Hrgota started his career as a youth player in lower league side IK Tord which he combined with competing in karate. In 2008, he made the decision to give up martial arts and transferred to second division team Jönköpings Södra IF. He made his debut with the first team in 2011 and became the league top scorer that season, netting 18 goals in 25 games. After the season Hrgota received the Player of the Year award from the club supporters. Several clubs were interested in buying him after his successful debut year but Hrgota decided to stay with Jönköpings Södra so that he could finish school in the spring. He went on to score 10 goals in 14 games the following season before moving to Germany in the summer.

=== Borussia Mönchengladbach ===
On 4 July 2012, he completed his move to the German club Borussia Mönchengladbach. He made his Bundesliga debut against TSG 1899 Hoffenheim as 74th-minute substitute, replacing Mike Hanke. On 11 May 2013, he made the first eleven for the first time against 1. FSV Mainz 05. He made a big impact on the game scoring a hat-trick. His first ever Bundesliga goal was a converted penalty five minutes before half-time. In the second half he scored two more goals, both with his left foot. After 85 minutes he was substituted for Lukas Rupp. On 15 June 2016, it was announced that Hrgota would join fellow Bundesliga team Eintracht Frankfurt on a three-year contract.

=== Eintracht Frankfurt ===
Hrgota scored in his first goal in the game in a 4–3 penalty shoot-out victory against 1. FC Magdeburg in the DFB-Pokal on 21 August 2016. On 20 December 2016, before the winter break, he scored a brace in a 3–0 win over 1. FSV Mainz 05 in the Bundesliga. Despite failing to score in the semi-final cup tie away from home against his former club Borussia Mönchengladbach on 25 April 2017, Hrgota slotted home the winning penalty in the shoot-out which Eintracht Frankfurt won 7–6, having drawn the game 1–1 in normal time.

=== Greuther Fürth ===
On 7 August 2019, Hrgota joined Greuther Fürth on a two-year deal. On 12 February 2022, Hrgota's opener against Hertha Berlin, after 27 seconds, was the fastest goal in that season.

=== St. Pauli ===
On 7 July 2026, Hrgota moved to St. Pauli.

== International career ==
Hrgota was eligible to play national team football for Sweden, Croatia, and Bosnia and Herzegovina. The Croatia U21 coach Ivo Šušak contacted him during the fall of 2012 in an attempt to bring Hrgota over to his team. However, in the summer of 2014, prior to Sweden's game against Austria in the UEFA European Championship qualifiers, Hrgota was called up to, and accepted to join, the Sweden national team. On 16 March 2022 Hrgota was selected for the World Cup Qualifier playoff 2022 against the Czech Republic and Poland, but did not get playing time.

== Personal life ==
Hrgota was born in Zenica in Bosnia and Herzegovina during the Bosnian War. His parents are ethnic Croats. The family moved to Sweden when Branimir was a child, settling in Jönköping. His younger brother, Marin, is also a footballer who plays for TSV Neudrossenfeld in the Bayernliga Nord.

== Career statistics ==
=== Club ===
As of match played 23 October 2026

Appearances and goals by club, season and competition
Club	Season	League			National cup (Note: Includes Svenska Cupen, DFB-Pokal)		Continental		Total	
Club	Season	Division	Apps	Goals	Apps	Goals	Apps	Goals	Apps	Goals
Jönköpings Södra IF	2011	Superettan	25	18	2	0	—		27	18
Jönköpings Södra IF	2012	Superettan	14	10	0	0	—		14	10
Jönköpings Södra IF	Total		39	28	2	0	0	0	41	28
Borussia Mönchengladbach II	2012–13	Regionalliga West	8	2	—		—		8	2
Borussia Mönchengladbach	2012–13	Bundesliga	13	3	0	0	4 (Note: One appearance in UEFA Champions League, three appearances in UEFA Europa League)	0	17	3
Borussia Mönchengladbach	2013–14	Bundesliga	30	2	1	0	—		31	2
Borussia Mönchengladbach	2014–15	Bundesliga	17	2	3	2	10 (Note: Appearances in UEFA Europa League)	8	30	12
Borussia Mönchengladbach	2015–16	Bundesliga	9	0	1	2	0	0	10	2
Borussia Mönchengladbach	Total		69	7	5	4	14	8	88	19
Eintracht Frankfurt	2016–17	Bundesliga	28	5	2	1	—		30	6
Eintracht Frankfurt	2017–18	Bundesliga	6	0	2	0	—		8	0
Eintracht Frankfurt	2018–19	Bundesliga	1	0	0	0	0	0	1	0
Eintracht Frankfurt	Total		35	5	4	1	0	0	39	6
Greuther Fürth	2019–20	2. Bundesliga	32	10	0	0	—		32	10
Greuther Fürth	2020–21	2. Bundesliga	31	16	3	0	—		34	16
Greuther Fürth	2021–22	Bundesliga	34	9	1	1	—		35	10
Greuther Fürth	2022–23	2. Bundesliga	33	11	1	0	—		34	11
Greuther Fürth	2023–24	2. Bundesliga	33	11	2	1	—		35	12
Greuther Fürth	2024–25	2. Bundesliga	33	6	2	0	—		35	6
Greuther Fürth	2025–26	2. Bundesliga	33	5	2	0	2 (Note: Appearances in Promotion to the Bundesliga)	0	37	5
Greuther Fürth	Total		229	68	11	2	2	0	242	70
St. Pauli	2026–27	2. Bundesliga	7	0	1	0	—		8	0
Career total			379	108	23	7	16	8	418	123

=== International ===
Appearances and goals by national team and year
National team	Year	Apps	Goals
Sweden	2014	3	0
Total		3	0

== Honours ==
Eintracht Frankfurt

- DFB-Pokal: 2017–18

Sweden U21

- UEFA European Under-21 Championship: 2015

Individual

- Superettan top scorer: 2011
