= Abdourahmane Barry =

Guinean footballer (born 2000)

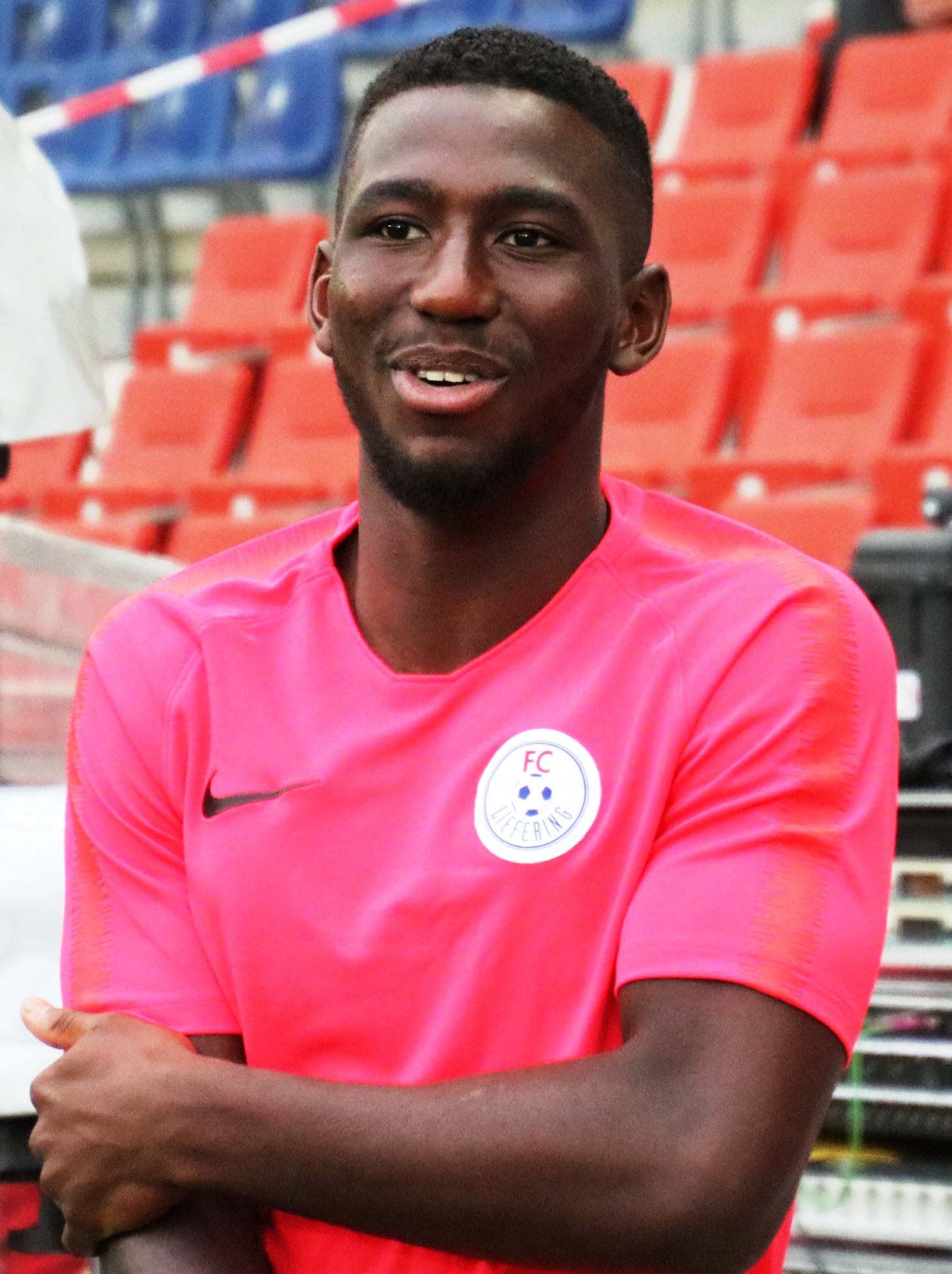
- Barry in August 2018

Personal information
- Date of birth: 21 February 2000 (age 26)
- Place of birth: Courbevoie, France
- Height: 1.83 m (6 ft 0 in)
- Position: Centre-back

Team information
- Current team: Versailles
- Number: 15

Youth career
- 2004–2013: Courbevoie Sports Football
- 2013–2018: Paris Saint-Germain

Senior career*
Years	Team	Apps	(Gls)
2018	Paris Saint-Germain II	4	(0)
2018–2020	FC Liefering	14	(1)
2020–2022	Greuther Fürth	17	(0)
2022–2025	Amiens	20	(0)
2025–2026	Paris 13 Atletico	22	(0)
2026–	Versailles	2	(0)

International career
2023–	Guinea	1	(0)
- * Club domestic league appearances and goals as of 23:45, 15 August 2026 (UTC)

Abdourahmane Barry (born 21 February 2000) is a professional footballer who plays as a centre-back for Ligue 3 club Versailles. Born in France, he represents the Guinea national team.

== Club career ==
Barry made his 2. Liga debut on 27 July 2018 against SV Horn. He played the full game.

On 10 July 2020, Barry's contract with Red Bull Salzburg was terminated.

In August 2020, Barry joined 2. Bundesliga club SpVgg Greuther Fürth signing a two-year contract with the option of a third year.

In June 2022, Barry returned to France and signed with Amiens. He signed for Versailles in July 2026.

== Personal life ==
Born in France, Barry is of Guinean descent.
