= Paul Jaeckel =

German footballer

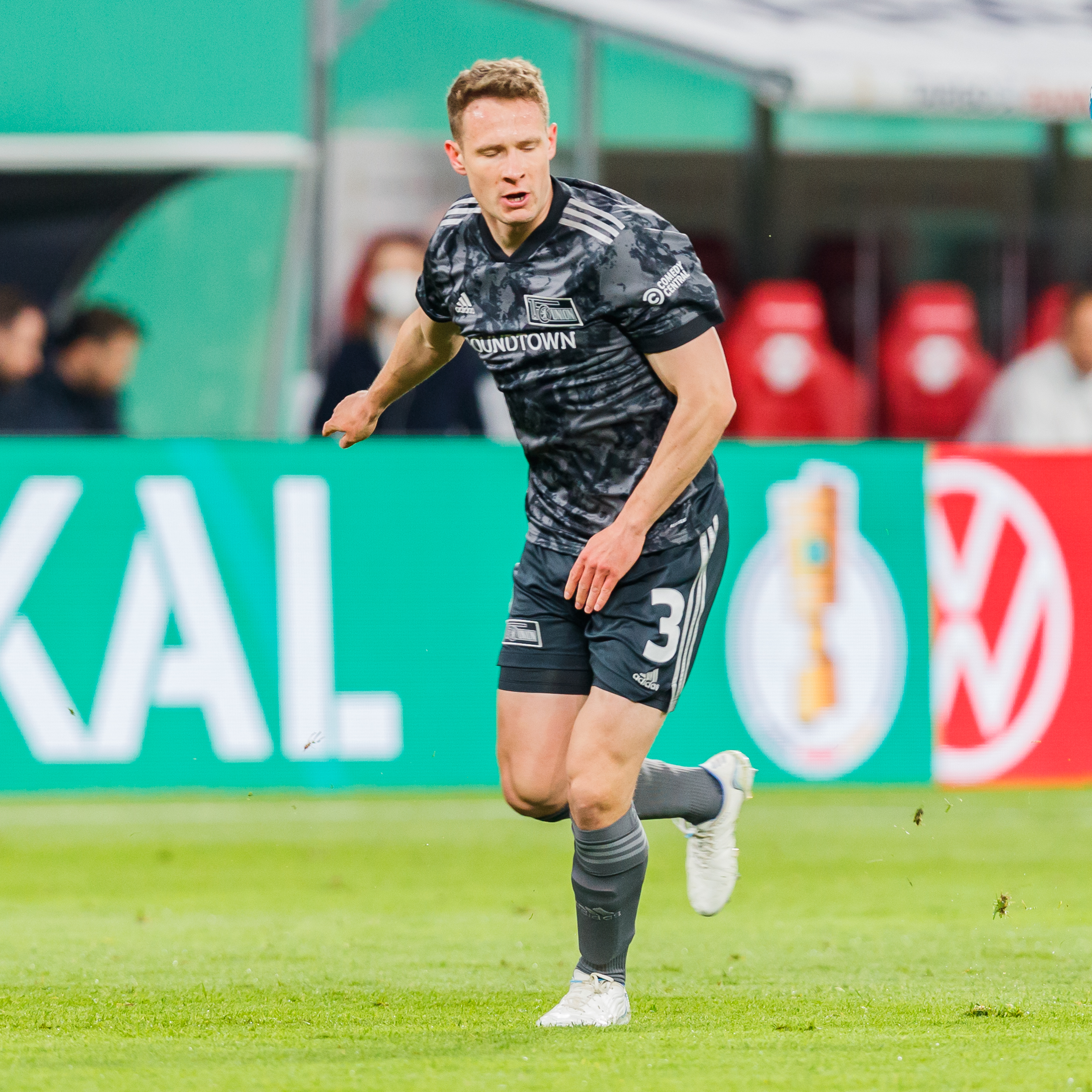
- Jaeckel with Union Berlin in 2022

Personal information
- Date of birth: 22 July 1998 (age 28)
- Place of birth: Eisenhüttenstadt, Germany
- Height: 1.86 m (6 ft 1 in)
- Position: Centre-back

Team information
- Current team: 1. FC Magdeburg
- Number: 6

Youth career
- 2003–2011: Eisenhüttenstädter FC Stahl
- 2011–2014: Energie Cottbus
- 2014–2017: VfL Wolfsburg

Senior career*
Years	Team	Apps	(Gls)
2017–2018	VfL Wolfsburg II	15	(0)
2018	VfL Wolfsburg	3	(0)
2018–2019	Greuther Fürth II	7	(1)
2018–2021	Greuther Fürth	67	(2)
2021–2025	Union Berlin	46	(1)
2024–2025	→ Eintracht Braunschweig (loan)	23	(1)
2025–2026	Preußen Münster	28	(0)
2026–	1. FC Magdeburg	0	(0)

International career^{‡}
2015–2016	Germany U18	5	(0)
2016	Germany U19	1	(0)
2020–2021	Germany U21	2	(0)
Medal record
UEFA European Under-21 Championship
Gold medal – first place	2021
- * Club domestic league appearances and goals as of 18 May 2026 ‡ National team caps and goals as of 14:50, 2 June 2021 (UTC)

Paul Jaeckel (born 22 July 1998) is a German professional footballer who plays as a centre-back for 2. Bundesliga club 1. FC Magdeburg.

Jaeckel has played Champions League, Europa League and Conference League football with Union Berlin. He has made 10 appearances through the German U18 to U21 youth levels.

== Career ==
Jaeckel joined Vfl Wolfsburg's academy from Energie Cottbus in 2014.

On 30 August 2018, Jaeckel joined 2. Bundesliga side SpVgg Greuther Fürth on a three-year contract. During the end of the 2019–20 season, he started to play regularly for the club.

On 29 April 2021, Jaeckel was announced at Union Berlin.

On 29 August 2024, Jaeckel was loaned to Eintracht Braunschweig.

On 15 July 2025, Jaeckel signed with Preußen Münster in 2. Bundesliga.

On 7 July 2026, Jaeckel moved to 1. FC Magdeburg.

== International career ==
Jaeckel made his Germany U21 debut against Slovenia U21s.
