= Marco Meyerhöfer =

German footballer

Personal information
- Date of birth: 18 November 1995 (age 30)
- Place of birth: Bad Homburg, Germany
- Height: 1.79 m (5 ft 10 in)
- Position: Right-back

Youth career
- 2001–2006: FSG Burg-Gräfenrode
- 2006–2014: Eintracht Frankfurt

Senior career*
Years	Team	Apps	(Gls)
2014–2017	1. FC Saarbrücken	46	(2)
2014	1. FC Saarbrücken II	1	(0)
2017–2019	Waldhof Mannheim	65	(3)
2019–2025	Greuther Fürth	142	(2)
2025–2026	Preußen Münster	18	(0)
- * Club domestic league appearances and goals as of 18 May 2026

Marco Meyerhöfer (born 18 November 1995) is a German professional footballer who plays as a right-back.

== Career ==
Meyerhöfer made his professional debut for Greuther Fürth in the 2. Bundesliga on 28 July 2019, starting in the home match against Erzgebirge Aue which finished as a 0–2 loss.

On 7 July 2025, Meyerhöfer signed with Preußen Münster.
