= Robin Kehr =

German footballer

Personal information
- Full name: Robin Luca Kehr
- Date of birth: 22 February 2000 (age 26)
- Place of birth: Pinneberg, Germany
- Height: 1.89 m (6 ft 2 in)
- Position: Forward

Youth career
- VfL Pinneberg
- –2009: Kummerfelder SV
- 2009–2015: FC St. Pauli
- 2015–2019: Borussia Dortmund

Senior career*
Years	Team	Apps	(Gls)
2019–2023	Greuther Fürth II	7	(3)
2019–2023	Greuther Fürth	8	(2)

International career
2016–2017	Germany U17	6	(3)
2017	Germany U18	1	(0)
- * Club domestic league appearances and goals

Robin Luca Kehr (born 22 February 2000) is a German former professional footballer who played as a forward.

== Career ==
Kehr made his professional debut for Greuther Fürth in the 2. Bundesliga on 4 October 2020, coming on as a substitute in the 78th minute for Jamie Leweling against Würzburger Kickers, which finished as a 2–2 away draw.

He was forced to retire in 2023 at the age of 23 due to persistent knee problems.
