= Leon Schaffran =

German footballer (born 2003)

Personal information
- Full name: Leon Valentin Schaffran
- Date of birth: 31 July 1998 (age 28)
- Place of birth: Berlin, Germany
- Height: 1.86 m (6 ft 1 in)
- Position: Goalkeeper

Team information
- Current team: Vaduz
- Number: 25

Youth career
- 2002–2009: BW Beelitz
- 2009–2012: RSV Eintracht 1949
- 2012–2016: Hertha BSC

Senior career*
Years	Team	Apps	(Gls)
2016–2018	Hertha BSC II	13	(0)
2018–2024	Greuther Fürth II	75	(0)
2018–2024	Greuther Fürth	6	(0)
2024–	Vaduz	62	(0)

International career^{‡}
2015	Germany U18	1	(0)
2017	Germany U19	1	(0)
- * Club domestic league appearances and goals as of 28 September 2026 ‡ National team caps and goals as of 00:17, 21 December 2022 (UTC)

Leon Valentin Schaffran (born 31 July 1998) is a German professional footballer who plays as a goalkeeper for Swiss Super League club Vaduz in Liechtenstein.

== Club career ==
Schaffran is a youth product of BW Beelitz, RSV Eintracht 1949, and Hertha. He began his senior career with the Hertha reserves in 2016, but left after 3 seasons without breaking into the senior team. He transferred to Greuther Fürth in the summer of 2018, where he was initially the third goalkeeper. He made his professional debut with Greuther Fürth a 2–0 DFB Pokal loss to Stuttgarter Kickers on 30 July 2022. He was briefly the starting goalkeeper in August 2022, after an injury to the starter Andreas Linde.

On 13 May 2024, Schaffran signed a one-year contract with Vaduz.

== International career ==
Schaffran is a youth international for Germany, having played up to the Germany U19s.
