= 2023–24 1. FC Kaiserslautern season =

1. FC Kaiserslautern
2023–24 season
- Board Member: Rainer Keßler (Chairman); Johannes Benjamin Remy (Deputy)
- Head coach: Dirk Schuster (until 30 November); Dimitrios Grammozis (from 3 December)
- Stadium: Fritz-Walter-Stadion
- 2. Bundesliga: 13th
- DFB-Pokal: Runners-up
- Top goalscorer: League: Ragnar Ache (16); All: Ragnar Ache (17)
- Average home league attendance: 43,888
Home colours	Away colours	Third colours

The 2023–24 season was 1. FC Kaiserslautern's 124th season in existence and second consecutive season in the 2. Bundesliga. They also competed in the DFB-Pokal, finishing as runners-up.

== Players ==
=== First-team squad ===
As of 23 December 2023

Note: Flags indicate national team as defined under FIFA eligibility rules; some limited exceptions apply. Players may hold more than one non-FIFA nationality.

No.	Pos.	Nation	Player
1	GK	GER	Andreas Luthe
2	DF	GER	Boris Tomiak
4	MF	NGR	Afeez Aremu
5	DF	GER	Kevin Kraus
6	DF	MLI	Almamy Touré
7	MF	GER	Marlon Ritter
8	MF	GER	Jean Zimmer (captain)
9	FW	GER	Ragnar Ache
10	MF	GER	Philipp Klement
11	MF	GER	Kenny Prince Redondo
13	FW	USA	Terrence Boyd
14	DF	CRO	Nikola Soldo (on loan from Köln)
15	DF	POL	Tymoteusz Puchacz (on loan from Union Berlin)
16	MF	GER	Julian Niehues
17	FW	GER	Aaron Opoku

No.	Pos.	Nation	Player
18	GK	GER	Julian Krahl
19	FW	GER	Daniel Hanslik
20	MF	GER	Tobias Raschl
21	MF	GER	Hendrick Zuck (vice-captain)
23	DF	GER	Philipp Hercher
25	FW	SUI	Filip Stojilković (on loan from Darmstadt 98)
27	FW	GER	Lex-Tyger Lobinger
29	FW	GER	Richmond Tachie
30	GK	BIH	Avdo Spahić
31	FW	GER	Ben Zolinski
33	DF	SUI	Jan Elvedi
35	GK	GER	Niklas Heeger
37	DF	GER	Erik Durm
39	MF	GER	Aaron Basenach

=== Out on loan ===
Note: Flags indicate national team as defined under FIFA eligibility rules; some limited exceptions apply. Players may hold more than one non-FIFA nationality.

No. / Pos. / Nation / Player; — / DF / GER / Neal Gibs (at SGV Freiberg until 30 June 2024)	No. / Pos. / Nation / Player; — / FW / GER / Angelos Stavridis (at Hessen Kassel until 30 June 2024)

== Transfers ==
=== In ===
Pos.	Player	Transferred from	Fee	Date	Source
DF	(Germany) Frank Ronstadt	(Germany) Darmstadt 98	€50,000	2 January 2024	
FW	(Nigeria) Dickson Abiama	(Germany) Greuther Fürth	Undisclosed	2 January 2024	

=== Out ===
Pos.	Player	Transferred to	Fee	Date	Source

== Pre-season and friendlies ==
Win Draw Loss Fixtures

22 June 2023 Friendly	Louisville City (United States)	1–2	(Germany) 1. FC Kaiserslautern	Louisville, United States
02:05	Mushagalusa 14'	Report	Boyd 27', 41'	Stadium: Lynn Family Stadium; Referee: Eric Tattersall (United States)

29 June 2023 Friendly	Minnesota United (United States)	2–1	(Germany) 1. FC Kaiserslautern	Saint Paul, United States
02:40	García 23'; Jeong 24'	Report	Boyd 5'	Stadium: Allianz Field; Attendance: 19,616; Referee: Fotis Bazakos (United States)

15 July 2023 Friendly	1. FC Kaiserslautern (Germany)	0–0	(England) Norwich City	Kaiserslautern
14:00		Report		Stadium: Fritz-Walter-Stadion; Attendance: 7,704; Referee: Nicolas Winter

22 July 2023 Friendly	Homburg (Germany)	1–4	(Germany) Kaiserslautern	Homburg
14:00				Stadium: Waldstadion Homburg

8 September 2023 Friendly	Viktoria Köln (Germany)	1–2	(Germany) 1. FC Kaiserslautern	Cologne
18:00				Stadium: Sportpark Höhenberg

13 October 2023 Friendly	1. FC Kaiserslautern (Germany)	2–3	(France) Metz	Kaiserslautern
15:00	Klement 6' (pen.); Raschl 49'	Report	Estupiñán 44' (pen.); Elisor 85'; Asoro 89'	Stadium: Platz 4 am Fritz-Walter-Stadion; Attendance: 1,050; Referee: Fabienne Michel

17 November 2023 Friendly	1. FC Kaiserslautern (Germany)	0–1	(Luxembourg) F91 Dudelange	Kaiserslautern
14:00				Stadium: FCK-Nachwuchsleistungszentrum

6 January 2024 Friendly	Gençlerbirliği (Turkey)	1–4	(Germany) 1. FC Kaiserslautern	Belek, Turkey
16::00	Kayode 19'	Report	Ache 5'; Abiama 55', 79'; Tomiak 85' (pen.)

10 January 2024 Friendly	Dynamo Dresden (Germany)	3–0	(Germany) 1. FC Kaiserslautern	Turkey

== Competitions ==
=== Overall record ===
Competition	First match	Last match	Starting round	Final position	Record							
Competition	First match	Last match	Starting round	Final position	Pld	W	D	L	GF	GA	GD	Win %
2. Bundesliga	29 July 2023	19 May 2024	Matchday 1	13th	34	11	6	17	59	64	−5	32.35
DFB-Pokal	13 August 2023	25 May 2024	First round	Runners-up	6	5	0	1	15	4	+11	83.33
Total					40	16	6	18	74	68	+6	40.00

Source: Soccerway

=== 2. Bundesliga ===
==== League table ====
Pos	Team	Pld	W	D	L	GF	GA	GD	Pts
11	SV Elversberg	34	12	7	15	49	63	−14	43
12	1. FC Nürnberg	34	11	7	16	43	64	−21	40
13	1. FC Kaiserslautern	34	11	6	17	59	64	−5	39
14	1. FC Magdeburg	34	9	11	14	46	54	−8	38
15	Eintracht Braunschweig	34	11	5	18	37	53	−16	38

Source: DFB
Rules for classification: 1) Points; 2) Goal difference; 3) Goals scored; 4) Head-to-head results; 5) Head-to-head away goals scored; 6) Away goals scored; 7) Play-off.
(Rules 4–6 only apply after home and away matches have been played between the tied teams.)

==== Results summary ====
Overall								Home						Away					
Pld	W	D	L	GF	GA	GD	Pts	W	D	L	GF	GA	GD	W	D	L	GF	GA	GD
19	6	3	10	32	39	−7	21	5	1	4	21	18	+3	1	2	6	11	21	−10

Last updated: 26 January 2024.
Source: DFB

==== Results by round ====
Round	1	2	3	4	5	6	7	8	9	10	11	12	13	14	15	16	17	18	19	20	21	22	23
Ground	H	A	H	A	H	A	H	A	H	A	H	H	A	H	A	H	A	A	H	A	H	A	H
Result	L	L	W	W	W	D	W	D	W	L	D	L	L	L	L	L	L	L	W				
Position	13	18	15	10	6	7	4	6	3	6	6	7	10	11	13	15	15	15	14				

Updated to match(es) played on 26 January 2024. Source: DFB
A = Away; H = Home; W = Win; D = Draw; L = Loss

==== Matches ====
The league fixtures were unveiled on 30 June 2023.

29 July 2023 1	1. FC Kaiserslautern	1–2	FC St. Pauli	Kaiserslautern
13:00 UTC+2	Tomiak (yellow card) 45+2'; Ache 65'; Zolinski (yellow card) 90+6'	Report	Saad 51'; Mets (yellow card) 54'; Hartel 75' (pen.)	Stadium: Fritz-Walter-Stadion; Attendance: 44,079; Referee: Robert Schröder

5 August 2023 2	Schalke 04	3–0	1. FC Kaiserslautern	Gelsenkirchen
20:30 UTC+2	Terodde 13'; Karaman 70'; Lasme 90+2'	Report		Stadium: Veltins-Arena; Attendance: 61,801; Referee: Harm Osmers

18 August 2023 3	1. FC Kaiserslautern	3–2	SV Elversberg	Kaiserslautern
18:30 UTC+2	Kraus 21' (pen.); Ache 68'; Zimmer 79'; Tachie (yellow card) 73'; Ritter (yellow card) 89'; Opoku (yellow card) 90+7'	Report	Feil 47'; Şahin 62', (yellow card) 90+5'	Stadium: Fritz-Walter-Stadion; Attendance: 42,621; Referee: Patrick Ittrich

25 August 2023 4	SC Paderborn	1–2	1. FC Kaiserslautern	Paderborn
18:30 UTC+2	Muslija 73'	Report	Ritter 59'; Ache 65'	Stadium: Home Deluxe Arena; Attendance: 13,475; Referee: Robin Braun

2 September 2023 5	1. FC Kaiserslautern	3–1	1. FC Nürnberg	Kaiserslautern
20:30 UTC+2	Tachie 19'; Puchacz 26'; Ache 30'	Report	Schleimer 37'	Stadium: Fritz-Walter-Stadion; Attendance: 43,677; Referee: Arne Aarnink

16 September 2023 6	Karlsruher SC	1–1	1. FC Kaiserslautern	Karlsruhe
13:00 UTC+2	Wanitzek 45+5' (pen.)	Report	Ache 5'	Stadium: Wildparkstadion; Attendance: 34,000; Referee: Deniz Aytekin

24 September 2023 7	1. FC Kaiserslautern	3–1	Hansa Rostock	Kaiserslautern
13:30 UTC+2	Raschl 3'; Kraus 17'; Ache 83'	Report	Brumado 29'	Stadium: Fritz-Walter-Stadion; Attendance: 40,450; Referee: Martin Petersen

1 October 2023 8	VfL Osnabrück	2–2	1. FC Kaiserslautern	Osnabrück
13:30 UTC+2	Engelhardt 17'; Cuisance 37' (pen.)	Report	Niehues 45+2'; Tomiak 90+8'	Stadium: Stadion an der Bremer Brücke; Attendance: 15,741; Referee: Daniel Schlager

6 October 2023 9	1. FC Kaiserslautern	3–1	Hannover 96	Kaiserslautern
18:30 UTC+2	Tomiak 45+5' (pen.), 90+10' (pen.); Opoku 79'	Report	Nielsen 17'	Stadium: Fritz-Walter-Stadion; Attendance: 43,017; Referee: Michael Bacher

21 October 2023 10	Fortuna Düsseldorf	4–3	1. FC Kaiserslautern	Düsseldorf
20:30 UTC+2	Tanaka 36', 63'; Zimmermann 49'; Klaus 57'	Report	Tachie 21'; Siebert 30' (o.g.); Ritter 32'	Stadium: Merkur Spielarena; Attendance: 52,000; Referee: Benjamin Brand

28 October 2023 11	1. FC Kaiserslautern	3–3	Hamburger SV	Kaiserslautern
20:30 UTC+2	Tomiak 13'; Ritter 24'; Boyd 54'	Report	Glatzel 10', 65'; Muheim 73'	Stadium: Fritz-Walter-Stadion; Attendance: 49,327; Referee: Florian Badstübner

4 November 2023 12	1. FC Kaiserslautern	0–2	Greuther Fürth	Kaiserslautern
13:00 UTC+1		Report	Jung 22'; Green 54' (pen.)	Stadium: Fritz-Walter-Stadion; Attendance: 40,302; Referee: Felix Zwayer

12 November 2023 13	SV Wehen Wiesbaden	2–1	1. FC Kaiserslautern	Wiesbaden
13:30 UTC+2	Bätzner 51'; Prtajin 65'	Report	Ritter 39'	Stadium: Brita-Arena; Attendance: 12,100; Referee: Tobias Reichel

26 November 2023 14	1. FC Kaiserslautern	0–3	Holstein Kiel	Kaiserslautern
13:30 CET	Ritter (yellow card) 45+1'	Report	Pichler 16' 58'; Arp 44'; Skrzybski (yellow card) 45+1'	Stadium: Fritz-Walter-Stadion; Attendance: 38,367; Referee: (Germany) Bastian Dankert

2 December 2023 15	1. FC Magdeburg	4–1	1. FC Kaiserslautern	Magdeburg
20:30 CET	Castaignos 17' (yellow card) 62'; Bockhorn (yellow card) 30' (goal) 51'; Condé (yellow card) 58'; Krempicki 75'; Piccini 85' (pen.)	Report	Zimmer (yellow card) 19'; Boyd 25'	Stadium: MDCC-Arena; Attendance: 25,214; Referee: (Germany) Florian Exner

9 December 2023 16	1. FC Kaiserslautern	1–2	Hertha BSC	Kaiserslautern
13:00 CET	Touré 16'; Aremu (red card) 59'; Kraus (yellow card) 85'	Report	Dárdai (yellow card) 43'; Niederlechner 49'; Kempf 81'; Ernst (yellow card) 90'; Bouchalakis (yellow card) 90+1'	Stadium: Fritz-Walter-Stadion; Attendance: 45,308; Referee: (Germany) Harm Osmers

17 December 2023 17	Eintracht Braunschweig	2–1	1. FC Kaiserslautern	Braunschweig
13:30 CET	Philippe 36'; Gomez 62'; Rittmüller (yellow card) 90+7'	Report	Bičakčić 14' (o.g.); Tomiak (yellow card) 18'; Raschl (yellow card) 28'; Soldo (yellow card) 52'	Stadium: Eintracht-Stadion; Attendance: 20,627; Referee: (Germany) Arne Aarnink

20 January 2024 18	FC St. Pauli	2–0	1. FC Kaiserslautern	Hamburg
13:00 CET	Saad 34'; Treu (yellow card) 43'; Wahl (yellow card) 50'; Hartel 64'; Smith (yellow card) 73'	Report	Tomaik (yellow card) 55'; Ritter (yellow card) 73'	Stadium: Millerntor-Stadion; Attendance: 29,546; Referee: (Germany) Tobias Welz

26 January 2024 19	1. FC Kaiserslautern	4–1	Schalke 04	Kaiserslautern
18:30 CET	Ache 10' 59'; Niehues (yellow card) 55'; Stojilković 67'; Opoku 70'	Report	Brunner (yellow card) 9'; Churlinov 51' (yellow card) 55'; Seguin (yellow card) 89'	Stadium: Fritz-Walter-Stadion; Attendance: 49,327; Referee: (Germany) Robin Braun

4 February 2024 20	Elversberg	2–1	1. FC Kaiserslautern	Spiesen-Elversberg
13:30 CET		Report		Stadium: Waldstadion an der Kaiserlinde; Attendance: 11,150; Referee: Deniz Aytekin

10 February 2024 21	1. FC Kaiserslautern	1–2	Paderborn	Kaiserslautern
20:30 CET		Report		Stadium: Fritz-Walter-Stadion; Attendance: 40,000; Referee: Martin Petersen

18 February 2024 22	1. FC Nürnberg	1–1	1. FC Kaiserslautern	Nürnberg
13:30 CET		Report		Stadium: Max-Morlock-Stadion; Attendance: 35,462; Referee: Michael Bacher

24 February 2024 23	1. FC Kaiserslautern	0–4	Karlsruher SC	Kaiserslautern
13:00 CET		Report		Stadium: Fritz-Walter-Stadion; Attendance: 49,327; Referee: Tobias Welz

2 March 2024 24	Hansa Rostock	0–3	1. FC Kaiserslautern	Rostock
13:00 CET	Hüsing (yellow card) 34' (yellow-red card) 37'; Brumado (yellow card) 72'	Report	Ache 6' 66' 76'; Redondo (yellow card) 57'	Stadium: Ostseestadion; Attendance: 26,500; Referee: Florian Badstübner

10 March 2024 25	1. FC Kaiserslautern	3–2	VfL Osnabrück	Kaiserslautern
13:30 CET	Ritter (yellow card) 61'; Ache 66' 90+2'; Zimmer (yellow card) 72'; Simakala 78'; Funkel (yellow card) 83'	Report	Wulff (yellow card) 61'; Engelhardt 48' 69'; Niemann (yellow card) 86'	Stadium: Fritz-Walter-Stadion; Attendance: 42,008; Referee: Sascha Stegemann

16 March 2024 26	Hannover 96	1–1	1. FC Kaiserslautern	Hannover
20:30 CET	Dehm (yellow card) 66'; Voglshammer (yellow card) 40' (goal) 68'; Teuchert (yellow card) 90+1'	Report	Niehues (yellow card) 44'; Redondo 53'; Stojilkovic (yellow card) 66'	Stadium: Niedersachsenstadion; Attendance: 42,500; Referee: Dr. Max Burda

30 March 2024 27	1. FC Kaiserslautern	1–3	Fortuna Düsseldorf	Kaiserslautern
13:00 CET	Ritter 26'	Report	Mustapha (yellow card) 40'; Tzolis 74' 82'; Appelkamp 76'	Stadium: Fritz-Walter-Stadion; Attendance: 46,210; Referee: Robert Schröder

6 April 2024 28	Hamburger SV	2–1	1. FC Kaiserslautern	Hamburg
13:00 CET	Bénes 34'; Poręba 60'; Königsdörffer (yellow card) 73'	Report	Ache 45+1'; Touré (yellow card) 57'; Funkel (yellow card) 90+3'	Stadium: Volksparkstadion; Attendance: 57,000; Referee: Deniz Aytekin

12 April 2024 29	Greuther Fürth	2–1	1. FC Kaiserslautern	Fürth
18:30 CET	Asta (yellow card) 4'; Wagner 54' 90+5'; Hrgota (yellow card) 65'	Report	Kaloč (yellow card) 8'; Ache 18'; Hercher (yellow card) 67'; Raschl (yellow card) 87'; Abiama (yellow card) 90'; Funkel (yellow card) 90+6'	Stadium: Sportpark Ronhof Thomas Sommer; Attendance: 15,680; Referee: Patrick Alt

20 April 2024 30	1. FC Kaiserslautern	1–1	SV Wehen Wiesbaden	Kaiserslautern
13:00 CET	Kaloč 30'; Zimmer (yellow card) 36'; Ritter (yellow card) 40'	Report	Bennetts (yellow card) 40'; Mathisen (yellow card) 45+2'; Bätzner (yellow card) 71'; Prtajin 74'	Stadium: Fritz-Walter-Stadion; Attendance: 42,168; Referee: Dr. Arne Aarnink

27 April 2024 31	Holstein Kiel	1–3	1. FC Kaiserslautern	Kiel
13:00 CET	Machino (yellow card) 45'; Bernhardsson 25' (yellow card) 66'; Schulz (yellow card) 59'; Ivezic (yellow card) 78'	Report	Hanslik 13'; Kaloč 45+4'; Ritter 83'	Stadium: Holstein-Stadion; Attendance: 15,034; Referee: Florian Badstübner

4 May 2024 32	1. FC Kaiserslautern	4–1	1. FC Magdeburg	Kaiserslautern
20:30 CET	Hanslik 15' 20' (yellow card) 75'; Kaloč (yellow card) 49'; Puchacz (yellow card) 53'; Redondo 57'; Elvedi 83'	Report	Müller (yellow card) 45'; Heber 79'; Teixeira (yellow card) 82'	Stadium: Fritz-Walter-Stadion; Attendance: 42,000; Referee: Patrick Ittrich

11 May 2024 33	Hertha BSC	3–1	1. FC Kaiserslautern	Berlin
13:00 CET	Tabakovic 19' (pen.); Zeefuik (yellow card) 25'; Dudziak 45+3'; Reese 67'; Winkler (yellow card) 79'	Report	Elvedi (yellow card) 18'; Zolinski (yellow card) 25'; Zimmer (yellow card) 30'; Ritter 39'	Stadium: Olympiastadion; Attendance: 67,144; Referee: Daniel Schlager

19 May 2024 34	1. FC Kaiserslautern	5–0	Eintracht Braunschweig	Kaiserslautern
15:30 CET	Ritter 36' 48' (yellow card) 58' (goal) 69'; Hanslik 53'; Touré (red card) 57'; Funkel (yellow card) 64'; Opoku 76'	Report	Marx (yellow card) 12'; Nikolaou (yellow card) 56'	Stadium: Fritz-Walter-Stadion; Attendance: 47,901; Referee: Florian Heft

=== DFB-Pokal ===
13 August 2023 First round	Rot-Weiß Koblenz	0–5	1. FC Kaiserslautern	Koblenz
15:30		Report	Boyd 19', 90'; Niehues 35'; Tomiak 43'; Puchacz (yellow card) 55'; Redondo 66' (pen.)	Stadium: Stadion Oberwerth; Referee: Sascha Stegemann

31 October 2023 Second round	1. FC Kaiserslautern	3–2	1. FC Köln	Kaiserslautern
20:45 UTC+1	Tachie 19'; Redondo 47'; Ritter 65'	Report	Thielmann 71'; Uth 81'	Stadium: Fritz-Walter-Stadion; Attendance: 49,327; Referee: Sven Jablonski

5 December 2023 Round of 16	1. FC Kaiserslautern	2–0	1. FC Nürnberg	Kaiserslautern
18:00 UTC+1	Soldo (yellow card) 18'; Zimmer (yellow card) 31'; Tachie 75'; Ache 78'; Tomiak (yellow card) 90'	Report	Duman (yellow card) 11'; Wekesser (yellow card) 80'	Stadium: Fritz-Walter-Stadion; Attendance: 48,349; Referee: (Germany) Patrick Ittrich

31 January 2024 Quarter-finals	Hertha BSC	1–3	1. FC Kaiserslautern	Berlin
20:45 CET	Tabaković (yellow card) 74'; Barkok (yellow card) 78'; Reese 90+1'	Report	Elvedi 5'; Tachie (yellow card) 20' (goal) 38'; Kaloč 69'	Stadium: Olympiastadion; Attendance: 74,245; Referee: (Germany) Matthias Jöllenbeck

2 April 2024 Semi-finals	1. FC Saarbrücken	0–2	1. FC Kaiserslautern	Saarbrücken
			Ritter 53'; Touré 75'	Stadium: Ludwigsparkstadion

25 May 2024 Final	1. FC Kaiserslautern	0–1	Bayer Leverkusen	Berlin
20:00	Elvedi (yellow card) 86'; Klement (yellow card) 90+5'	Report	Kossounou (yellow card) 3' (yellow-red card) 44'; Xhaka 17'	Stadium: Olympiastadion; Attendance: 74,322; Referee: Bastian Dankert
