= 2024 DFB-Pokal final =

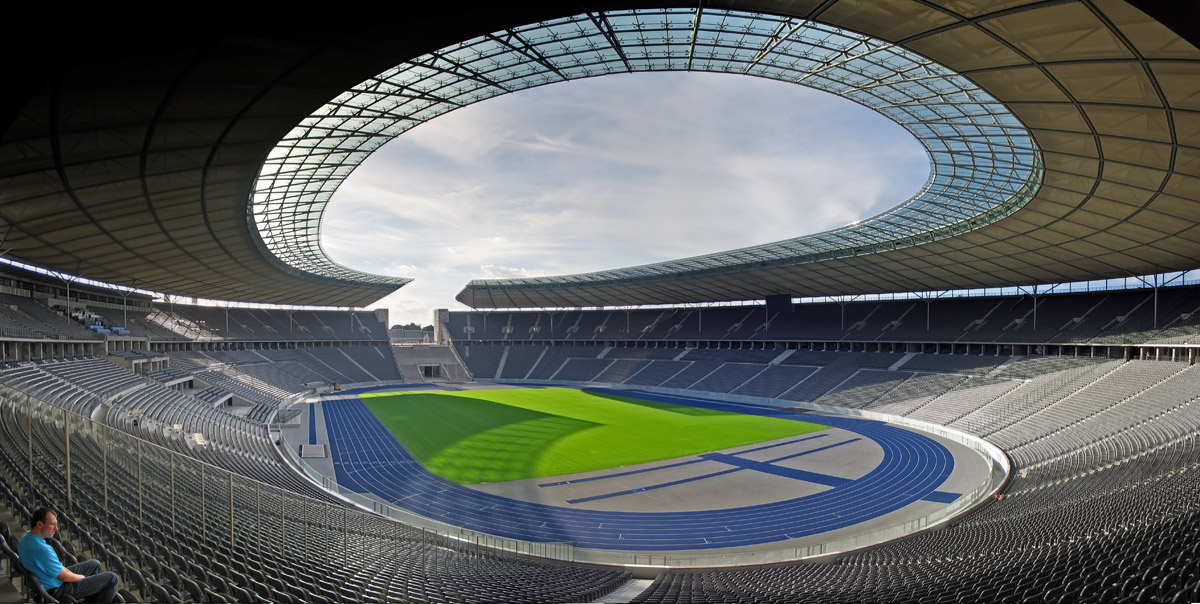
- The Olympiastadion in Berlin hosted the final.
- Event: 2023–24 DFB-Pokal
1. FC Kaiserslautern	Bayer Leverkusen
0	1
- Date: 25 May 2024
- Venue: Olympiastadion, Berlin
- Referee: Bastian Dankert (Rostock)
- Attendance: 74,322

The 2024 DFB-Pokal final decided the winner of the 2023–24 DFB-Pokal, the 81st season of the annual German football cup competition. The match was played on 25 May 2024 at the Olympiastadion in Berlin.

The match featured 1. FC Kaiserslautern, a 2. Bundesliga side, and Bundesliga champions Bayer Leverkusen. Leverkusen won the match 1–0 for their second DFB-Pokal title.

With the win, Leverkusen completed their first domestic double, and therefore faced Bundesliga runners-up VfB Stuttgart in the 2024 DFL-Supercup.

Furthermore, since Leverkusen already qualified for the Champions League through the Bundesliga, the seventh-placed team in the Bundesliga, TSG Hoffenheim, earned qualification for the group stage of the 2024–25 UEFA Europa League, and the play-off round spot of the 2024–25 UEFA Conference League went to the team in eighth, 1. FC Heidenheim.

== Teams ==
In the following table, finals until 1943 were in the Tschammerpokal era, since 1953 were in the DFB-Pokal era.

Team	Previous final appearances (bold indicates winners)
1. FC Kaiserslautern	7 (1961, 1972, 1976, 1981, **1990**, **1996**, 2003)
Bayer Leverkusen	4 (**1993**, 2002, 2009, 2020)

== Route to the final ==
The DFB-Pokal began with 64 teams in a single-elimination knockout cup competition. There were a total of five rounds leading up to the final. Teams were drawn against each other, and the winner after 90 minutes advanced. If still tied, 30 minutes of extra time were played. If the score was still level, a penalty shoot-out was used to determine the winner.

Note: In all results below, the score of the finalist is given first (H: home; A: away).

1. FC Kaiserslautern		Round	Bayer Leverkusen	
Opponent	Result	2023–24 DFB-Pokal	Opponent	Result
Rot-Weiß Koblenz	5–0 (A)	First round	Teutonia Ottensen	8–0 (A)
1. FC Köln	3–2 (H)	Second round	SV Sandhausen	5–2 (A)
1. FC Nürnberg	2–0 (H)	Round of 16	SC Paderborn	3–1 (H)
Hertha BSC	3–1 (A)	Quarter-finals	VfB Stuttgart	3–2 (H)
1. FC Saarbrücken	2–0 (A)	Semi-finals	Fortuna Düsseldorf	4–0 (H)

== Match ==
=== Details ===
25 May 2024
20:00 CEST

1. FC Kaiserslautern	0–1	Bayer Leverkusen
	Report	Xhaka 16'

Olympiastadion, Berlin
Attendance: 74,322
Referee: Bastian Dankert (Rostock)

**1. FC Kaiserslautern**	**Bayer Leverkusen**

GK	18	(Germany) Julian Krahl
RB	31	(Germany) Ben Zolinski		(substituted off) 74'
CB	33	(Switzerland) Jan Elvedi	(yellow card) 86'
CB	2	(Germany) Boris Tomiak
LB	15	(Poland) Tymoteusz Puchacz
DM	26	(Czech Republic) Filip Kaloč
RM	8	(Germany) Jean Zimmer (c)		(substituted off) 90+3'
CM	7	(Germany) Marlon Ritter
CM	20	(Germany) Tobias Raschl		(substituted off) 83'
LM	11	(Germany) Kenny Prince Redondo		(substituted off) 83'
CF	19	(Germany) Daniel Hanslik		(substituted off) 46'
Substitutes:
GK	32	(Germany) Robin Himmelmann
DF	5	(Germany) Kevin Kraus
DF	6	(Mali) Almamy Touré		(substituted on) 90+3'
DF	27	(Germany) Frank Ronstadt
MF	4	(Nigeria) Afeez Aremu
MF	10	(Germany) Philipp Klement	(yellow card) 90+6'	(substituted on) 83'
FW	9	(Germany) Ragnar Ache		(substituted on) 46'
FW	17	(Germany) Aaron Opoku		(substituted on) 83'
FW	29	(Germany) Richmond Tachie		(substituted on) 74'
Manager:
(Germany) Friedhelm Funkel

GK	1	(Finland) Lukas Hradecky (c)	(yellow card) 90+7'
CB	6	(Ivory Coast) Odilon Kossounou	(yellow card) 3' (yellow-red card) 44'
CB	4	(Germany) Jonathan Tah
CB	12	(Burkina Faso) Edmond Tapsoba
RM	30	(Netherlands) Jeremie Frimpong		(substituted off) 90+3'
CM	34	(Switzerland) Granit Xhaka
CM	8	(Germany) Robert Andrich
LM	20	(Spain) Álex Grimaldo		(substituted off) 85'
RW	7	(Germany) Jonas Hofmann		(substituted off) 46'
LW	10	(Germany) Florian Wirtz		(substituted off) 90+3'
CF	14	(Czech Republic) Patrik Schick		(substituted off) 46'
Substitutes:
GK	17	(Czech Republic) Matěj Kovář
DF	2	(Croatia) Josip Stanišić		(substituted on) 46'
DF	3	(Ecuador) Piero Hincapié		(substituted on) 85'
MF	19	(Nigeria) Nathan Tella		(substituted on) 90+3'
MF	21	(Morocco) Amine Adli		(substituted on) 46'
MF	25	(Argentina) Exequiel Palacios
FW	9	(Spain) Borja Iglesias
FW	22	(Nigeria) Victor Boniface
FW	23	(Czech Republic) Adam Hložek		(substituted on) 90+3'
Manager:
(Spain) Xabi Alonso

Assistant referees:
René Rohde (Rostock)
Marcel Unger (Hamburg)
Fourth official:
Florian Badstübner (Nuremberg)
Reserve assistant referee:
Stefan Lupp (Zossen)
Video assistant referee:
Harm Osmers (Hanover)
Assistant video assistant referee:
Holger Henschel (Braunschweig)

**Match rules**

- 90 minutes
- 30 minutes of extra time if necessary
- Penalty shoot-out if scores still level
- Maximum of nine named substitutes
- Maximum of five substitutions
- Maximum of three substitution opportunities

== See also ==
- 2024 DFL-Supercup
- Football in Berlin
