= 2023–24 DFB-Pokal =

Tournament details
- Country: Germany
- Venue(s): Olympiastadion, Berlin
- Dates: 11 August 2023 – 25 May 2024
- Teams: 64

Final positions
- Champions: Bayer Leverkusen (2nd title)
- Runners-up: 1. FC Kaiserslautern

Tournament statistics
- Matches played: 63
- Goals scored: 303 (4.81 per match)
- Attendance: 1,368,503 (21,722 per match)
- Top goal scorer: Amine Adli (5 goals)
- Goals scored in penalty shoot-outs are not included.

The 2023–24 DFB-Pokal was the 81st season of the annual German football cup competition. Sixty-four teams participated in the competition, including all teams from the previous year's Bundesliga and 2. Bundesliga. The competition began on 11 August 2023 with the first of six rounds and ended on 25 May 2024 with the final at the Olympiastadion in Berlin, a nominally neutral venue, which has hosted the final since 1985. The DFB-Pokal is considered the second-most important club title in German football after the Bundesliga championship. The DFB-Pokal is run by the German Football Association (DFB).

The two-time defending champions were Bundesliga side RB Leipzig, after they had defeated Eintracht Frankfurt 2–0 in the previous final, but they were eliminated in the second round by VfL Wolfsburg. Bayer Leverkusen won their second title after defeating 1. FC Kaiserslautern 1–0 in the final.

The winner of the DFB-Pokal would normally have earned automatic qualification for the league phase of the 2024–25 edition of the UEFA Europa League. However, Leverkusen had already qualified for the UEFA Champions League as winners of the Bundesliga, so their spot went to the team in seventh place, while the league's UEFA Conference League play-off round spot went to the eighth-placed team. Leverkusen also qualified for the 2024 edition of the DFL-Supercup at the start of the next season, where they faced the runners-up of the 2023–24 Bundesliga, VfB Stuttgart.

== Participating clubs ==
The following teams qualified for the competition:

Bundesliga the 18 clubs of the 2022–23 season	2. Bundesliga; the 18 clubs of the 2022–23 season	3. Liga; the top 4 clubs of the 2022–23 season
FC Augsburg; Hertha BSC; Union Berlin; VfL Bochum; Werder Bremen; Borussia Dortmund; Eintracht Frankfurt; SC Freiburg; TSG Hoffenheim; 1. FC Köln; RB Leipzig; Bayer Leverkusen; Mainz 05; Borussia Mönchengladbach; Bayern Munich; Schalke 04; VfB Stuttgart; VfL Wolfsburg	Arminia Bielefeld; Eintracht Braunschweig; Darmstadt 98; Fortuna Düsseldorf; Greuther Fürth; Hamburger SV; Hannover 96; 1. FC Heidenheim; 1. FC Kaiserslautern; Karlsruher SC; Holstein Kiel; 1. FC Magdeburg; 1. FC Nürnberg; SC Paderborn; Jahn Regensburg; Hansa Rostock; SV Sandhausen; FC St. Pauli	SV Elversberg; VfL Osnabrück; Wehen Wiesbaden; 1. FC Saarbrücken (Note: 1. FC Saarbrücken qualified as the fifth-placed team of the 3. Liga as the runners-up SC Freiburg II were ineligible to participate.)
Representatives of the regional associations 24 representatives of 21 regional associations of the DFB, qualified (in general) through the 2022–23 Verbandspokal (Note: The three regions with the most participating teams in their league competitions (Bavaria, Lower Saxony, and Westphalia) were allowed to enter two teams for the competition.)
Baden: Astoria Walldorf; Bavaria (Note: In addition to the Bavarian Cup winners, the best-placed amateur team of the Regionalliga Bayern also qualified.): FV Illertissen (CW); SpVgg Unterhaching (RB); Berlin: Makkabi Berlin; Brandenburg: Energie Cottbus; Bremen: FC Oberneuland; Hamburg: Teutonia Ottensen; Hesse: FSV Frankfurt	Lower Rhine: Rot-Weiss Essen; Lower Saxony (Note: The Lower Saxony Cup was split into two paths: one for 3. Liga and Regionalliga Nord teams, and the other for amateur teams. The winners of each path qualified.): Atlas Delmenhorst (3L/RL) (Note: Atlas Delmenhorst qualified regardless of the outcome of the final of the Lower Saxony Cup, as VfL Osnabrück, the other finalists, already qualified for the DFB-Pokal through their 3. Liga position.); TuS Bersenbrück (Am.); Mecklenburg-Vorpommern: Rostocker FC; Middle Rhine: Viktoria Köln; Rhineland: Rot-Weiß Koblenz; Saarland: FC 08 Homburg (Note: Since both finalists of the Saarland Cup, 1. FC Saarbrücken and SV Elversberg, qualified for the DFB-Pokal through their 3. Liga positions, a play-off match was held on 30 May 2023 between the other two semi-finalists, SV Auersmacher and FC 08 Homburg; the match ended in a 4–1 win for Homburg.); Saxony: Lokomotive Leipzig	Saxony-Anhalt: Hallescher FC; Schleswig-Holstein: VfB Lübeck; South Baden: SV Oberachern; Southwest: Schott Mainz; Thuringia: Carl Zeiss Jena; Westphalia (Note: In addition to the Westphalian Cup winners, the best-placed Westphalian team of the Regionalliga West also qualified.): FC Gütersloh (CW); Preußen Münster (RW); Württemberg: TSG Balingen

== Format ==
=== Participation ===
The DFB-Pokal began with a round of 64 teams. The 36 teams of the Bundesliga and 2. Bundesliga, along with the top four finishers of the 3. Liga automatically qualified for the tournament. Of the remaining slots, 21 were given to the cup winners of the regional football associations, the Verbandspokal. The three remaining slots were given to the three regional associations with the most men's teams, which were Bavaria, Lower Saxony and Westphalia. The best-placed amateur team of the Regionalliga Bayern was given the spot for Bavaria. For Lower Saxony, the Lower Saxony Cup was split into two paths: one for 3. Liga and Regionalliga Nord teams, and the other for amateur teams. The winners of each path qualified. For Westphalia, the spot was rotated each season between the best-placed Westphalian team of the Regionalliga West and the best-placed amateur team of the Oberliga Westfalen. For the 2023–24 DFB-Pokal, this spot was awarded to a team from the Regionalliga. As every team was entitled to participate in local tournaments which qualified for the association cups, every team could in principle compete in the DFB-Pokal. Reserve teams and combined football sections were not permitted to enter, along with no two teams of the same association or corporation.

=== Draw ===
The draws for the different rounds were conducted as follows:

For the first round, the participating teams were split into two pots of 32 teams each. The first pot contained all teams which qualified through their regional cup competitions, the best four teams of the 3. Liga, and the bottom four teams of the 2. Bundesliga. Every team from this pot was drawn to a team from the second pot, which contained all remaining professional teams (all the teams of the Bundesliga and the remaining fourteen 2. Bundesliga teams). The teams from the first pot were set as the home team in the process.

The two-pot scenario was also applied for the second round, with the remaining 3. Liga and/or amateur team(s) in the first pot and the remaining Bundesliga and 2. Bundesliga teams in the other pot. Once again, the 3. Liga and/or amateur team(s) served as hosts. This time the pots did not have to be of equal size though, depending on the results of the first round. Theoretically, it was even possible that there could be only one pot, if all of the teams from one of the pots from the first round beat all the others in the second pot. Once one pot was empty, the remaining pairings were drawn from the other pot with the first-drawn team for a match serving as hosts.

For the remaining rounds, the draw was conducted from just one pot. Any remaining 3. Liga and/or amateur team(s) were the home team if drawn against a professional team. In every other case, the first-drawn team served as hosts.

=== Match rules ===
Teams met in one game per round. Matches took place for 90 minutes, with two halves of 45 minutes each. If still tied after regulation, 30 minutes of extra time were played, consisting of two periods of 15 minutes each. If the score was still level after this, the match was decided by a penalty shoot-out. A coin toss decided who took the first penalty. A maximum of nine players could be listed on the substitute bench, while a maximum of five substitutions were allowed. However, each team was only given three opportunities to make substitutions, with a fourth opportunity in extra time, excluding substitutions made at half-time, before the start of extra time and at half-time in extra time. From the round of 16 onward, a video assistant referee was appointed for all DFB-Pokal matches. Though technically possible, VAR was not used for home matches of Bundesliga clubs prior to the round of 16 in order to provide a uniform approach to all matches.

=== Suspensions ===
If a player received five yellow cards in the competition, he was suspended from the next cup match. Similarly, receiving a second yellow card suspended a player from the next cup match. If a player received a direct red card, they were suspended a minimum of one match, but the German Football Association reserved the right to increase the suspension.

=== International qualification ===
The winners of the DFB-Pokal earned automatic qualification for the league phase of next season's edition of the UEFA Europa League. If they had already qualified for the UEFA Champions League through position in the Bundesliga, then the spot went to the team in sixth place, and the league's UEFA Conference League play-off round spot to the team in seventh place. The winners also hosted the DFL-Supercup at the start of the next season, and faced the champions of the previous year's Bundesliga, unless the same team won the Bundesliga and the DFB-Pokal, completing a double. In that case, the runners-up of the Bundesliga took the spot instead.

== Schedule ==
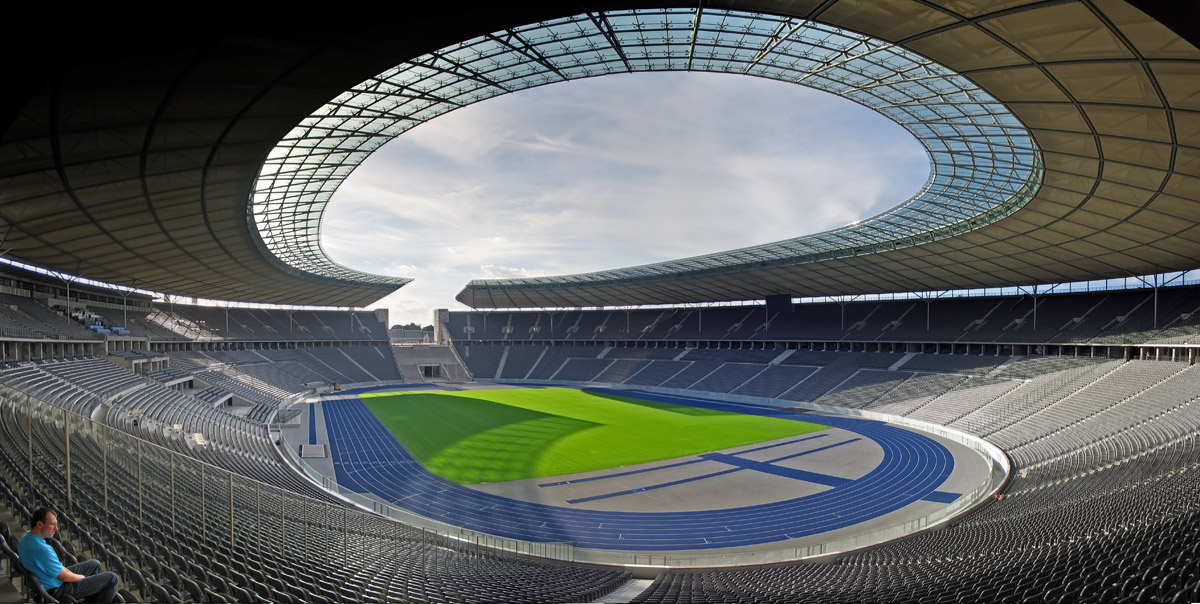
The Olympiastadion in Berlin hosted the final.

All draws were generally held on a Sunday evening after each round (unless noted otherwise).

The rounds of the 2023–24 competition were scheduled as follows:

Round	Draw date	Matches
First round	18 June 2023	11–14 August & 26–27 September 2023
Second round	1 October 2023	31 October – 1 November 2023
Round of 16	5 November 2023	5–6 December 2023
Quarter-finals	10 December 2023	30–31 January & 6–7 February 2024
Semi-finals	11 February 2024	2–3 April 2024
Final	11 February 2024	25 May 2024 at Olympiastadion, Berlin

== Matches ==
A total of sixty-three matches took place, starting with the first round on 11 August 2023 and culminating with the final on 25 May 2024 at the Olympiastadion in Berlin.

Times up to 28 October 2023 and from 31 March 2024 are CEST (UTC+2). Times from 29 October 2023 to 30 March 2024 are CET (UTC+1).

=== First round ===
The draw for the first round was held on 18 June 2023, with Sarah Vogel drawing the matches. Thirty of the thirty-two matches took place from 11 to 14 August 2023. The remaining two matches, involving the participants of the 2023 DFL-Supercup (played on 12 August), took place from 26 to 27 September 2023.

11 August 2023	SV Sandhausen	3–3 (a.e.t.) (4–2 p)	Hannover 96	Sandhausen
18:00	Hennings 45+3' (pen.); Arrey-Mbi 77' (o.g.); Knipping 86'	Report	Schaub 27'; Halstenberg 42'; Teuchert 82'	Stadium: GP Stadion am Hardtwald; Attendance: 4,605; Referee: Deniz Aytekin
	Penalties
	Diekmeier (penalty scored); Mühling (penalty scored); Maciejewski (penalty scored); El-Zein (penalty scored)		(penalty missed) Besuschkow; (penalty scored) Tresoldi; (penalty scored) Halstenberg; (penalty missed) Ernst

11 August 2023	1. FC Saarbrücken	2–1	Karlsruher SC	Saarbrücken
18:00	Civeja 47'; Brünker 90'	Report	Stindl 65'	Stadium: Ludwigsparkstadion; Attendance: 14,284; Referee: Arne Aarnink

11 August 2023	TuS Bersenbrück	0–7	Borussia Mönchengladbach	Osnabrück (Note: The TuS Bersenbrück v Borussia Mönchengladbach match took place at the Stadion an der Bremer Brücke instead of TuS Bersenbrück's home stadium, the Hasestadion in Bersenbrück.)
18:00		Report	Honorat 21', 56'; Ngoumou 26'; Čvančara 32', 34'; Hack 77'; Ranos 89'	Stadium: Stadion an der Bremer Brücke; Attendance: 16,098; Referee: Alexander Sather

11 August 2023	Eintracht Braunschweig	1–3	Schalke 04	Braunschweig
20:45	Ujah 12'	Report	Karaman 19'; Seguin 42'; Latza 90+4'	Stadium: Eintracht-Stadion; Attendance: 21,800; Referee: Patrick Ittrich

12 August 2023	TSG Balingen	0–4	VfB Stuttgart	Reutlingen (Note: The TSG Balingen v VfB Stuttgart match took place at the Stadion an der Kreuzeiche instead of TSG Balingen's home stadium, the Bizerba-Arena in Balingen.)
13:00		Report	Millot 25'; Silas 34'; Guirassy 43'; Endo 55'	Stadium: Stadion an der Kreuzeiche; Attendance: 13,400; Referee: Robert Kampka

12 August 2023	Carl Zeiss Jena	0–5	Hertha BSC	Jena
13:00		Report	Dardai 6'; Tabaković 47'; Richter 49', 52'; Uremović 59'; Hennings 45+3' (pen.)	Stadium: Ernst-Abbe-Sportfeld; Attendance: 13,000; Referee: Florian Heft

12 August 2023	Atlas Delmenhorst	0–5	FC St. Pauli	Delmenhorst
15:30		Report	Smith 24'; Schobert 59' (o.g.); Saad 68'; Hartel 70' (pen.); Afolayan 88'	Stadium: Städtisches Stadion an der Düsternortstraße; Attendance: 4,999; Referee: Patrick Schwengers

12 August 2023	FC Oberneuland	1–9	1. FC Nürnberg	Bremen
15:30	Lambers 89'	Report	Uzun 10', 14', 67'; Hayashi 15'; Gürleyen 19'; Duman 25', 29' (pen.); Goller 71'; Daferner 90'	Stadium: Marko Mock Arena; Attendance: 2,187; Referee: Lukas Benen

12 August 2023	Schott Mainz	1–6	Borussia Dortmund	Mainz (Note: The Schott Mainz v Borussia Dortmund match took place at the Mewa Arena instead of Schott Mainz's home stadium, the Otto-Schott-Sportzentrum in Mainz.)
15:30	Gans 34'	Report	Haller 22', 35'; Brandt 24'; Sabitzer 57'; Malen 79'; Moukoko 85'	Stadium: Mewa Arena; Attendance: 30,312; Referee: Benjamin Brand

12 August 2023	Viktoria Köln	3–2	Werder Bremen	Cologne
15:30	Philipp 72', 79'; Bogićević 90+4'	Report	Ducksch 43'; Füllkrug 77' (pen.)	Stadium: Sportpark Höhenberg; Attendance: 8,343; Referee: Frank Willenborg

12 August 2023	Teutonia Ottensen	0–8	Bayer Leverkusen	Hamburg (Note: The Teutonia Ottensen v Bayer Leverkusen match took place at the Millerntor-Stadion instead of Teutonia Ottensen's home stadium, the Stadion Hoheluft in Ottensen.)
15:30		Report	Tapsoba 16'; Boniface 42'; Wirtz 45+1'; Adli 59' (pen.); Frimpong 67'; Hložek 74', 89'; Hofmann 81'	Stadium: Millerntor-Stadion; Attendance: 11,035; Referee: Tom Bauer

12 August 2023	FC Gütersloh	0–2	Holstein Kiel	Gütersloh
15:30		Report	Friðjónsson 72', 90+3'	Stadium: Heidewaldstadion; Attendance: 5,259; Referee: Patrick Kessel

12 August 2023	Hallescher FC	0–1	Greuther Fürth	Halle
18:00		Report	Sieb 18'	Stadium: Leuna Chemie Stadion; Attendance: 13,000; Referee: Florian Exner

12 August 2023	SV Elversberg	0–1	Mainz 05	Spiesen-Elversberg
18:00		Report	Ajorque 73' (pen.)	Stadium: Waldstadion an der Kaiserlinde; Attendance: 10,000; Referee: Martin Petersen

12 August 2023	Arminia Bielefeld	2–2 (a.e.t.) (4–1 p)	VfL Bochum	Bielefeld
18:00	Shipnoski 25'; Biankadi 29'	Report	Asano 45+2'; Zoller 90+1'	Stadium: Schüco-Arena; Attendance: 21,452; Referee: Sven Jablonski
	Penalties
	Klos (penalty scored); Gohlke (penalty scored); Boujellab (penalty scored); Mizuta (penalty scored)		(penalty missed) Hofmann; (penalty missed) Stöger; (penalty scored) Mašović

13 August 2023	Rostocker FC	0–8	1. FC Heidenheim	Rostock (Note: The Rostocker FC v 1. FC Heidenheim match took place at the Ostseestadion instead of Rostocker FC's home stadium, the Sportpark am Damerower Weg in Rostock.)
13:00		Report	Beck 9'; Kleindienst 12', 15'; Maloney 18'; Pieringer 38', 72'; Dinkçi 53'; Schimmer 87'	Stadium: Ostseestadion; Attendance: 3,500; Referee: Nicolas Winter

13 August 2023	Rot-Weiss Essen	3–4 (a.e.t.)	Hamburger SV	Essen
13:00	Müsel 42'; Doumbouya 56'; Brumme 83'	Report	Jatta 37', 54'; Glatzel 66'; Bénes 117'	Stadium: Stadion an der Hafenstraße; Attendance: 18,600; Referee: Felix Zwayer

13 August 2023	FV Illertissen	1–3	Fortuna Düsseldorf	Illertissen
15:30	Frisorger 41'	Report	Frisorger 3' (o.g.); Vermeij 27'; Tzolis 90+1'	Stadium: Vöhlinstadion; Attendance: 3,719; Referee: Lars Erbst

13 August 2023	Makkabi Berlin	0–6	VfL Wolfsburg	Berlin
15:30		Report	Nmecha 8'; Wind 9'; Tomás 53', 89'; Gerhardt 57'; Baku 79'	Stadium: Mommsenstadion; Attendance: 4,800; Referee: Riem Hussein

13 August 2023	Rot-Weiß Koblenz	0–5	1. FC Kaiserslautern	Koblenz
15:30		Report	Boyd 19', 90'; Niehues 35'; Tomiak 43'; Redondo 66' (pen.)	Stadium: Stadion Oberwerth; Attendance: 10,176; Referee: Sascha Stegemann

13 August 2023	SpVgg Unterhaching	2–0	FC Augsburg	Unterhaching
15:30	Fetsch 29'; Mashigo 90+4'	Report		Stadium: Sportpark Unterhaching; Attendance: 12,500; Referee: Timo Gerach

13 August 2023	Lokomotive Leipzig	0–7	Eintracht Frankfurt	Leipzig
15:30		Report	Kolo Muani 37'; Götze 58'; Marmoush 66'; Dina Ebimbe 71', 89'; Ngankam 74', 85'	Stadium: Bruno-Plache-Stadion; Attendance: 11,100; Referee: Michael Bacher

13 August 2023	SV Oberachern	0–2	SC Freiburg	Freiburg (Note: The SV Oberachern v SC Freiburg match took place at the Dreisamstadion instead of SV Oberachern's home stadium, the Sportplatz am Waldsee in Oberachern.)
15:30		Report	Günter 60'; Sallai 77'	Stadium: Dreisamstadion; Attendance: 24,500; Referee: Richard Hempel

13 August 2023	Energie Cottbus	0–7	SC Paderborn	Cottbus
18:00		Report	Pelivan 4' (pen.); Musliu 11'; Bilbija 20', 51'; Muslija 64'; Klaas 83'; Hansen 85'	Stadium: Stadion der Freundschaft; Attendance: 12,469; Referee: Robert Schröder

13 August 2023	Astoria Walldorf	0–4	Union Berlin	Walldorf
18:00		Report	Knoche 29' (pen.); Becker 38'; Leite 41'; Haberer 80'	Stadium: Dietmar-Hopp-Sportpark; Attendance: 4,000; Referee: Wolfgang Haslberger

13 August 2023	FSV Frankfurt	1–1 (a.e.t.) (0–3 p)	Hansa Rostock	Frankfurt
18:00	McLemore 29'	Report	Güler 83'	Stadium: PSD Bank Arena; Attendance: 7,374; Referee: Christian Dingert
	Penalties
	Azaouagh (penalty missed); Falaye (penalty missed); Emmerling (penalty missed)		(penalty scored) Bachmann; (penalty scored) Rossipal; (penalty scored) Güler

14 August 2023	FC 08 Homburg	3–0	Darmstadt 98	Homburg
18:00	Mendler 10'; Heilig 49'; Harres 81'	Report		Stadium: Waldstadion Homburg; Attendance: 12,000; Referee: Daniel Schlager

14 August 2023	Jahn Regensburg	1–2	1. FC Magdeburg	Regensburg
18:00	Kother 63'	Report	Schuler 16'; Hugonet 59'	Stadium: Jahnstadion Regensburg; Attendance: 6,500; Referee: Patrick Alt

14 August 2023	VfB Lübeck	1–4	TSG Hoffenheim	Lübeck
18:00	Gözüsirin 34' (pen.)	Report	Kramarić 42', 60' (pen.); Bülter 69'; Justvan 76'	Stadium: Stadion an der Lohmühle; Attendance: 13,000; Referee: Florian Lechner

14 August 2023	VfL Osnabrück	1–3 (a.e.t.)	1. FC Köln	Osnabrück
20:45	Makridis 73'	Report	Schmitz 43'; Adamyan 93'; Chabot 96'	Stadium: Stadion an der Bremer Brücke; Attendance: 15,741; Referee: Florian Badstübner

26 September 2023	Preußen Münster	0–4	Bayern Munich	Münster
20:45		Report	Choupo-Moting 9'; Laimer 40'; Krätzig 45+5'; Tel 86'	Stadium: Preußenstadion; Attendance: 12,794; Referee: Matthias Jöllenbeck

27 September 2023	Wehen Wiesbaden	2–3	RB Leipzig	Wiesbaden
20:45	Prtajin 41', 73'	Report	Forsberg 7'; Šeško 18', 70'	Stadium: BRITA-Arena; Attendance: 12,000; Referee: Robert Hartmann

=== Second round ===
The draw for the second round was held on 1 October 2023, with Shkodran Mustafi drawing the matches. The sixteen matches took place on 31 October and 1 November 2023.

31 October 2023	FC 08 Homburg	2–1	Greuther Fürth	Homburg
18:00	Eisele 31'; Harres 83'	Report	Hrgota 52'	Stadium: Waldstadion Homburg; Attendance: 5,000; Referee: Florian Lechner

31 October 2023	FC St. Pauli	2–1 (a.e.t.)	Schalke 04	Hamburg
18:00	Hartel 57' (pen.); Eggestein 102'	Report	Kamiński 16'	Stadium: Millerntor-Stadion; Attendance: 29,546; Referee: Bastian Dankert

31 October 2023	VfB Stuttgart	1–0	Union Berlin	Stuttgart
18:00	Undav 45'	Report		Stadium: MHPArena; Attendance: 54,000; Referee: Sascha Stegemann

31 October 2023	VfL Wolfsburg	1–0	RB Leipzig	Wolfsburg
18:00	Černý 14'	Report		Stadium: Volkswagen Arena; Attendance: 16,031; Referee: Florian Badstübner

31 October 2023	Arminia Bielefeld	1–1 (a.e.t.) (3–4 p)	Hamburger SV	Bielefeld
20:45	Shipnoski 11'	Report	Jatta 77'	Stadium: Schüco-Arena; Attendance: 26,500; Referee: Robert Kampka
	Penalties
	Klos (penalty missed); Gohlke (penalty scored); Mizuta (penalty scored); Großer (penalty scored); Wörl (penalty missed)		(penalty scored) Bénes; (penalty scored) Muheim; (penalty scored) Glatzel; (penalty missed) Krahn; (penalty scored) Heyer

31 October 2023	SpVgg Unterhaching	3–6 (a.e.t.)	Fortuna Düsseldorf	Unterhaching
20:45	Hobsch 34', 55'; Skarlatidis 71'	Report	Klaus 65'; Jóhannesson 67', 79', 107'; Tzolis 115'; Jastrzembski 117'	Stadium: Sportpark Unterhaching; Attendance: 10,000; Referee: Alexander Sather

31 October 2023	Borussia Mönchengladbach	3–1	1. FC Heidenheim	Mönchengladbach
20:45	Pefok 3', 9'; Hack 44'	Report	Beck 78'	Stadium: Borussia-Park; Attendance: 41,660; Referee: Timo Gerach

31 October 2023	1. FC Kaiserslautern	3–2	1. FC Köln	Kaiserslautern
20:45	Tachie 19'; Redondo 47'; Ritter 65'	Report	Thielmann 71'; Uth 81'	Stadium: Fritz-Walter-Stadion; Attendance: 49,327; Referee: Sven Jablonski

1 November 2023	SV Sandhausen	2–5	Bayer Leverkusen	Sandhausen
18:00	Ehlich 50'; Ben Balla 57'	Report	Palacios 21' (pen.); Tah 54'; Hložek 85'; Adli 88', 90+2'	Stadium: GP Stadion am Hardtwald; Attendance: 10,022; Referee: Richard Hempel

1 November 2023	Holstein Kiel	3–3 (a.e.t.) (3–4 p)	1. FC Magdeburg	Kiel
18:00	Heber 61' (o.g.); Piccini 68' (o.g.); Pichler 120+2'	Report	Bockhorn 3'; Krempicki 11'; Amaechi 93'	Stadium: Holstein-Stadion; Attendance: 11,112; Referee: Tom Bauer
	Penalties
	Machino (penalty scored); Simakala (penalty missed); Kleine-Bekel (penalty scored); Rothe (penalty missed); Holtby (penalty scored)		(penalty scored) Condé; (penalty missed) Amaechi; (penalty scored) Bockhorn; (penalty scored) Gnaka; (penalty scored) Arslan

1 November 2023	SC Freiburg	1–3	SC Paderborn	Freiburg
18:00	Eggestein 69'	Report	Bilbija 4', 56'; Muslija 33'	Stadium: Europa-Park Stadion; Attendance: 31,500; Referee: Christian Dingert

1 November 2023	Borussia Dortmund	1–0	TSG Hoffenheim	Dortmund
18:00	Reus 43'	Report		Stadium: Signal Iduna Park; Attendance: 81,365; Referee: Harm Osmers

1 November 2023	Viktoria Köln	0–2	Eintracht Frankfurt	Cologne
20:45		Report	Skhiri 14'; Knauff 90'	Stadium: Sportpark Höhenberg; Attendance: 8,343; Referee: Max Burda

1 November 2023	1. FC Saarbrücken	2–1	Bayern Munich	Saarbrücken
20:45	Sontheimer 45+1'; Gaus 90+6'	Report	Müller 16'	Stadium: Ludwigsparkstadion; Attendance: 16,003; Referee: Frank Willenborg

1 November 2023	1. FC Nürnberg	3–2 (a.e.t.)	Hansa Rostock	Nuremberg
20:45	Okunuki 63'; Lohkemper 90+5', 99'	Report	Brumado 58'; Kinsombi 74'	Stadium: Max-Morlock-Stadion; Attendance: 28,489; Referee: Arne Aarnink

1 November 2023	Hertha BSC	3–0	Mainz 05	Berlin
20:45	Reese 45+3' (pen.); Tabaković 50' (pen.), 61'	Report		Stadium: Olympiastadion; Attendance: 29,621; Referee: Matthias Jöllenbeck

=== Round of 16 ===
The draw for the round of 16 was held on 5 November 2023, with Denise Schindler drawing the matches. The eight matches took place on 5 and 6 December 2023.

5 December 2023	1. FC Kaiserslautern	2–0	1. FC Nürnberg	Kaiserslautern
18:00	Tachie 75'; Ache 78'	Report		Stadium: Fritz-Walter-Stadion; Attendance: 48,349; Referee: Patrick Ittrich

5 December 2023	1. FC Magdeburg	1–2	Fortuna Düsseldorf	Magdeburg
18:00	Atik 15'	Report	Niemiec 87', 90+2'	Stadium: MDCC-Arena; Attendance: 20,090; Referee: Robert Hartmann

5 December 2023	Borussia Mönchengladbach	1–0 (a.e.t.)	VfL Wolfsburg	Mönchengladbach
20:45	Koné 120'	Report		Stadium: Borussia-Park; Attendance: 39,827; Referee: Bastian Dankert

5 December 2023	FC 08 Homburg	1–4	FC St. Pauli	Homburg
20:45	Mendler 28'	Report	Wahl 24'; Saad 64'; Hartel 69'; Eggestein 73'	Stadium: Waldstadion Homburg; Attendance: 12,232; Referee: Martin Petersen

6 December 2023	1. FC Saarbrücken	2–0	Eintracht Frankfurt	Saarbrücken
18:00	Brünker 64'; Kerber 78'	Report		Stadium: Ludwigsparkstadion; Attendance: 15,905; Referee: Daniel Siebert

6 December 2023	Bayer Leverkusen	3–1	SC Paderborn	Leverkusen
18:00	Boniface 12'; Palacios 28'; Schick 87'	Report	Klaas 83'	Stadium: BayArena; Attendance: 29,249; Referee: Tobias Stieler

6 December 2023	VfB Stuttgart	2–0	Borussia Dortmund	Stuttgart
20:45	Guirassy 55'; Silas 77'	Report		Stadium: MHPArena; Attendance: 54,500; Referee: Benjamin Brand

6 December 2023	Hertha BSC	3–3 (a.e.t.) (5–3 p)	Hamburger SV	Berlin
20:45	Reese 21', 90'; Kenny 120'	Report	Pherai 31'; Bénes 43'; Königsdörffer 102'	Stadium: Olympiastadion; Attendance: 58,946; Referee: Sascha Stegemann
	Penalties
	Prevljak (penalty scored); Klemens (penalty scored); El-Jindaoui (penalty scored); Kenny (penalty scored); Reese (penalty scored)		(penalty scored) Bénes; (penalty scored) Muheim; (penalty scored) Glatzel; (penalty missed) Königsdörffer

=== Quarter-finals ===
The draw for the quarter-finals was held on 10 December 2023, with Jens Nowotny drawing the matches. The four matches took place from 30 to 31 January, 6 February and 12 March 2024.

30 January 2024	FC St. Pauli	2–2 (a.e.t.) (3–4 p)	Fortuna Düsseldorf	Hamburg
20:45	Hartel 60' (pen.); Boukhalfa 120+1'	Report	Vermeij 38' (pen.); Tanaka 99'	Stadium: Millerntor-Stadion; Attendance: 29,546; Referee: Sascha Stegemann
	Penalties
	Smith (penalty scored); Saad (penalty scored); Sinani (penalty scored); Maurides (penalty missed); Hartel (penalty missed)		(penalty scored) Hoffmann; (penalty missed) Daferner; (penalty scored) Engelhardt; (penalty scored) Tanaka; (penalty scored) Tzolis

31 January 2024	Hertha BSC	1–3	1. FC Kaiserslautern	Berlin
20:45	Reese 90+1'	Report	Elvedi 5'; Tachie 38'; Kaloč 69'	Stadium: Olympiastadion; Attendance: 74,245; Referee: Matthias Jöllenbeck

6 February 2024	Bayer Leverkusen	3–2	VfB Stuttgart	Leverkusen
20:45	Andrich 50'; Adli 66'; Tah 90'	Report	Anton 11'; Führich 58'	Stadium: BayArena; Attendance: 30,210; Referee: Daniel Schlager

12 March 2024 (Note: The match, originally scheduled for 7 February 2024, was postponed after heavy rains.)	1. FC Saarbrücken	2–1	Borussia Mönchengladbach	Saarbrücken
20:30	Naïfi 11'; Brünker 90+3'	Report	Hack 8'	Stadium: Ludwigsparkstadion; Attendance: 15,903; Referee: Robert Hartmann

=== Semi-finals ===
The draw for the semi-finals was held on 11 February 2024, with Béla Réthy drawing the matches. The two matches took place on 2 and 3 April 2024.

2 April 2024	1. FC Saarbrücken	0–2	1. FC Kaiserslautern	Saarbrücken
20:45		Report	Ritter 53'; Touré 75'	Stadium: Ludwigsparkstadion; Attendance: 15,903; Referee: Marco Fritz

3 April 2024	Bayer Leverkusen	4–0	Fortuna Düsseldorf	Leverkusen
20:45	Frimpong 7'; Adli 20'; Wirtz 36', 60' (pen.)	Report		Stadium: BayArena; Attendance: 30,210; Referee: Christian Dingert

=== Final ===
The final took place on 25 May 2024 at the Olympiastadion in Berlin.

25 May 2024
20:00 CEST

1. FC Kaiserslautern	0–1	Bayer Leverkusen
	Report	Xhaka 16'

Olympiastadion, Berlin
Attendance: 74,322
Referee: Bastian Dankert (Rostock)

== Top goalscorers ==
The following were the top scorers of the DFB-Pokal, sorted first by number of goals, and then alphabetically if necessary. Goals scored in penalty shoot-outs are not included.

Rank	Player	Team	Goals
1	(Morocco) Amine Adli	Bayer Leverkusen	5
2	(Germany) Filip Bilbija	SC Paderborn	4
2	(Germany) Marcel Hartel	FC St. Pauli	4
2	(Germany) Fabian Reese	Hertha BSC	4
5	(Germany) Kai Brünker	1. FC Saarbrücken	3
5	(Germany) Robin Hack	Borussia Mönchengladbach	3
5	(Czech Republic) Adam Hložek	Bayer Leverkusen	3
5	(The Gambia) Bakery Jatta	Hamburger SV	3
5	(Iceland) Ísak Jóhannesson	Fortuna Düsseldorf	3
5	(Bosnia and Herzegovina) Haris Tabaković	Hertha BSC	3
5	(Germany) Richmond Tachie	1. FC Kaiserslautern	3
5	(Turkey) Can Uzun	1. FC Nürnberg	3
5	(Germany) Florian Wirtz	Bayer Leverkusen	3
