= 2022–23 SpVgg Greuther Fürth season =

SpVgg Greuther Fürth
2022–23 season
- President: Fred Höfler
- Head coach: Marc Schneider (until 15 October); Alexander Zorniger (from 23 October)
- Stadium: Sportpark Ronhof Thomas Sommer
- 2. Bundesliga: 12th
- DFB-Pokal: First round
Home colours	Away colours	Third colours

The 2022–23 season was the 120th in the history of SpVgg Greuther Fürth and their first season back in the second division. The club participated in the 2. Bundesliga and DFB-Pokal.

== Players ==
As of 12 July 2022

Note: Flags indicate national team as defined under FIFA eligibility rules; some limited exceptions apply. Players may hold more than one non-FIFA nationality.

No.	Pos.	Nation	Player
1	GK	SWE	Andreas Linde
2	DF	GER	Simon Asta
3	DF	MAR	Oualid Mhamdi
5	DF	TUN	Oussama Haddadi
6	MF	GER	Sidney Raebiger
7	FW	GER	Robin Kehr
8	MF	GER	Nils Seufert
9	FW	ANG	Afimico Pululu
10	FW	SWE	Branimir Hrgota (captain)
11	FW	NGA	Dickson Abiama
13	MF	GER	Max Christiansen
15	DF	NED	Jetro Willems
17	FW	JPN	Lucien Littbarski
18	DF	GER	Marco Meyerhöfer

No.	Pos.	Nation	Player
19	DF	GER	Oliver Fobassam
20	MF	GER	Tobias Raschl
21	MF	GER	Timothy Tillman
22	MF	GER	Sebastian Griesbeck
23	DF	GER	Gideon Jung
25	GK	GER	Leon Schaffran
27	DF	GER	Gian-Luca Itter
28	MF	TUN	Jeremy Dudziak
30	FW	GER	Armindo Sieb
31	MF	GER	Devin Angleberger
37	MF	USA	Julian Green
39	FW	GER	Ragnar Ache (on loan from Eintracht Frankfurt)
41	GK	FIN	Lasse Schulz

== Pre-season and friendlies ==
Pre-season match details
Date	Time	Opponent	Venue	Result F–A	Scorers	Attendance	Ref.
18 June 2022	16:15	CSKA Sofia	Neutral (Note: Match played at Stadion Jenbach, Jenbach, Austria.)	4–1	Raschl 25', Abiama 30', Ache 48', 81'	150	
22 June 2022	18:00	Ludogorets Razgrad	Neutral (Note: Match played at Koasastadion Sankt Johann, St. Johann in Tirol, Austria.)	1–1 (Note: Match was played in two 60-minute halves.)	Jung 53'	150	
25 June 2022	16:00	Basel	Neutral (Note: Match played at Sportplatz Gmund, Gmund am Tegernsee.)	2–3	Angleberger 64', Ache 85'		
2 July 2022	15:00	FK Pardubice	Neutral (Note: Match played at Sportanlage 1. SC Feucht, Gmund am Tegernsee.)	1–0	Sieb 48'	400	
6 July 2022	17:30	FC Ingolstadt	Neutral (Note: Match played at LEONI-Sportpark, Feucht.)	3–1	Asta 5', 22', Seufert 61'	550	
9 July 2022	17:30	Young Boys	Away	1–1	Hrgota 71' pen.	2,000	
22 September 2022	18:00	Blau-Weiß Linz	Home	2–1	Green 3', Sieb 86'	860	
9 December 2022	17:00	ATSV Erlangen	Away (Note: Match played at ATSV-Sportanlage Paul-Gossen-Straße, Erlangen.)	4–2	Abiama 25', Pululu 57', 79' pen., Hrgota 75'	230	
15 December 2022	15:00	FC Ingolstadt	Away	3–1	o.g. 43', Abiama 80', Green 90'		
20 December 2022	14:00	1899 Hoffenheim	Away	3–3	Hrgota 58', Abiama 72', Sieb 74'	0	
5 January 2023	14:00	Pendikspor		3–0	Green 30' pen., Dudziak 85', Pululu 90+6'		
10 January 2023	16:00	Hansa Rostock	Neutral (Note: Match played at the Trendy Lara Hotel Complex, Antalya, Turkey.)	1–4	Sieb 54'		
21 January 2023	14:00	Blau-Weiß Linz	Home	3–1	Abiama 57', 69', Raschl 80'		
23 March 2023	14:00	Eintracht Frankfurt	Away	1–1	Ache 54'		

== Competitions ==
=== 2. Bundesliga ===
==== League table ====
Pos	Team	Pld	W	D	L	GF	GA	GD	Pts
10	Hannover 96	34	12	8	14	50	55	−5	44
11	1. FC Magdeburg	34	12	7	15	48	55	−7	43
12	Greuther Fürth	34	10	11	13	47	50	−3	41
13	Hansa Rostock	34	12	5	17	32	48	−16	41
14	1. FC Nürnberg	34	10	9	15	32	49	−17	39

Source: DFB
Rules for classification: 1) Points; 2) Goal difference; 3) Goals scored; 4) Head-to-head results; 5) Head-to-head away goals scored; 6) Away goals scored; 7) Play-off.

==== Matches ====
The league fixtures were announced on 17 June 2022.

2. Bundesliga match details
Match	Date	Time	Opponent	Venue	Result F–A	Scorers	Attendance	Ref.
1	16 July 2022	13:00	Holstein Kiel	Home	2–2	Green 48', Tillman 76'	8,756	
2	23 July 2022	13:00	1. FC Nürnberg	Away	0–2		41,204	
3	5 August 2022	18:30	Karlsruher SC	Home	1–1	Ache 57'	9,678	
4	14 August 2022	13:30	Fortuna Düsseldorf	Away	2–2	Hrgota 43', 78' pen.	23,861	
5	21 August 2022	13:30	1. FC Kaiserslautern	Home	1–3	Raschl 13'	12,500	
6	28 August 2022	13:30	Hannover 96	Away	1–2	Pululu 81'	22,800	
7	3 September 2022	13:00	FC St. Pauli	Home	2–2	Hrgota 48', Irvine 52' o.g.	10,553	
8	11 September 2022	13:30	1. FC Magdeburg	Away	1–2	Michalski 42'	18,955	
9	18 September 2022	13:30	SC Paderborn 07	Home	2–1	Michalski 42', Hrgota 73'	8,530	
10	1 October 2022	13:00	SV Sandhausen	Home	1–1	Green 48'	8,637	
11	7 October 2022	18:30	Jahn Regensburg	Away	2–2	Michalski 34', Asta 74'	10,716	
12	14 October 2022	18:30	Hansa Rostock	Home	2–2	Hrgota 20', Ache 60'	10,516	
13	23 October 2022	13:30	1. FC Heidenheim	Away	1–3	Hrgota 52'	8,500	
14	28 October 2022	18:30	Arminia Bielefeld	Home	1–0	Sieb 30'	9,433	
15	6 November 2022	13:30	Eintracht Braunschweig	Away	1–0	Sieb 41'	17,580	
16	9 November 2022	18:30	Hamburger SV	Home	1–0	Sieb 8'	13,266	
17	13 November 2022	13:30	SV Darmstadt 98	Away	1–1	Michalski 42'	15,080	
18	28 January 2023	13:00	Holstein Kiel	Away	1–2	Abiama 30'	11,438	
19	4 February 2023	20:30	1. FC Nürnberg	Home	1–0	Ache 90'	16,626	
20	10 February 2023	18:30	Karlsruher SC	Away	1–2	Breithaupt 21' o.g.	15,612	
21	18 February 2023	13:00	Fortuna Düsseldorf	Home	2–1	Ache 28', 57'	9,804	
22	25 February 2023	13:00	1. FC Kaiserslautern	Away	1–3	Hrgota 62'	39,124	
23	5 March 2023	13:30	Hannover 96	Home	1–1	Hrgota 57' pen.	10,845	
24	11 March 2023	13:00	FC St. Pauli	Away	1–2	Ache 6'	29,346	
25	18 March 2023	13:00	1. FC Magdeburg	Home	3–0	Green 64', Heber 69' o.g., Petkov 75'	11,619	
26	2 April 2023	13:30	SC Paderborn 07	Away	2–3	Abiama 82', Hrgota 87'	10,952	
27	9 April 2023	13:30	SV Sandhausen	Away	2–0	Hrgota 9', Ache 26'	4,951	
28	14 April 2023	18:30	Jahn Regensburg	Home	2–1	Green 66' pen., Abiama 77'	12,570	
29	22 April 2023	13:00	Hansa Rostock	Away	0–2		24,000	
30	28 April 2023	18:30	1. FC Heidenheim	Home	0–2		11,897	
31	5 May 2023	18:30	Arminia Bielefeld	Away	1–1	Hrgota 26' pen.	22,015	
32	13 May 2023	13:00	Eintracht Braunschweig	Home	2–2	Green 23', 54'	11,430	
33	20 May 2023	20:30	Hamburger SV	Away	1–2	Petkov 84'	56,535	
34	28 May 2023	15:30	SV Darmstadt 98	Home	4–0	Raschl 50', Asta 58', Sieb 71', Green 78'	14,333	

=== DFB-Pokal ===
DFB-Pokal match details
Round	Date	Time	Opponent	Venue	Result F–A	Scorers	Attendance	Ref.
First round	30 July 2022	18:00	Stuttgarter Kickers	Away	0–2		7,500	
