= Tymoteusz Puchacz =

Polish footballer

- Puchacz in 2026

Personal information
- Full name: Tymoteusz Puchacz
- Date of birth: 23 January 1999 (age 27)
- Place of birth: Sulechów, Poland
- Height: 1.80 m (5 ft 11 in)
- Position: Left-back

Team information
- Current team: Sabah
- Number: 27

Youth career
- –2012: Pogoń Świebodzin
- 2012–2013: UKP Zielona Góra
- 2013–2017: Lech Poznań

Senior career*
Years	Team	Apps	(Gls)
2016–2018	Lech Poznań II	39	(2)
2017–2021	Lech Poznań	63	(4)
2018	→ Zagłębie Sosnowiec (loan)	17	(0)
2018–2019	→ GKS Katowice (loan)	25	(4)
2021–2024	Union Berlin	1	(0)
2022	→ Trabzonspor (loan)	9	(0)
2023	→ Panathinaikos (loan)	13	(0)
2023–2024	→ 1. FC Kaiserslautern (loan)	31	(1)
2024–2026	Holstein Kiel	10	(0)
2025	→ Plymouth Argyle (loan)	15	(0)
2025–2026	→ Sabah (loan)	28	(0)
2026–	Sabah	10	(0)

International career^{‡}
2015	Poland U16	6	(0)
2015–2016	Poland U17	14	(0)
2016–2017	Poland U18	9	(1)
2017–2018	Poland U19	12	(0)
2018–2019	Poland U20	18	(1)
2020	Poland U21	5	(0)
2021–	Poland	16	(0)
- * Club domestic league appearances and goals as of 13:38, 10 November 2026 (UTC) ‡ National team caps and goals as of 22:10, 28 September 2026 (UTC)

Tymoteusz Puchacz (born 23 January 1999) is a Polish professional footballer who plays as a left-back for Azerbaijan Premier League club Sabah.

== Club career ==
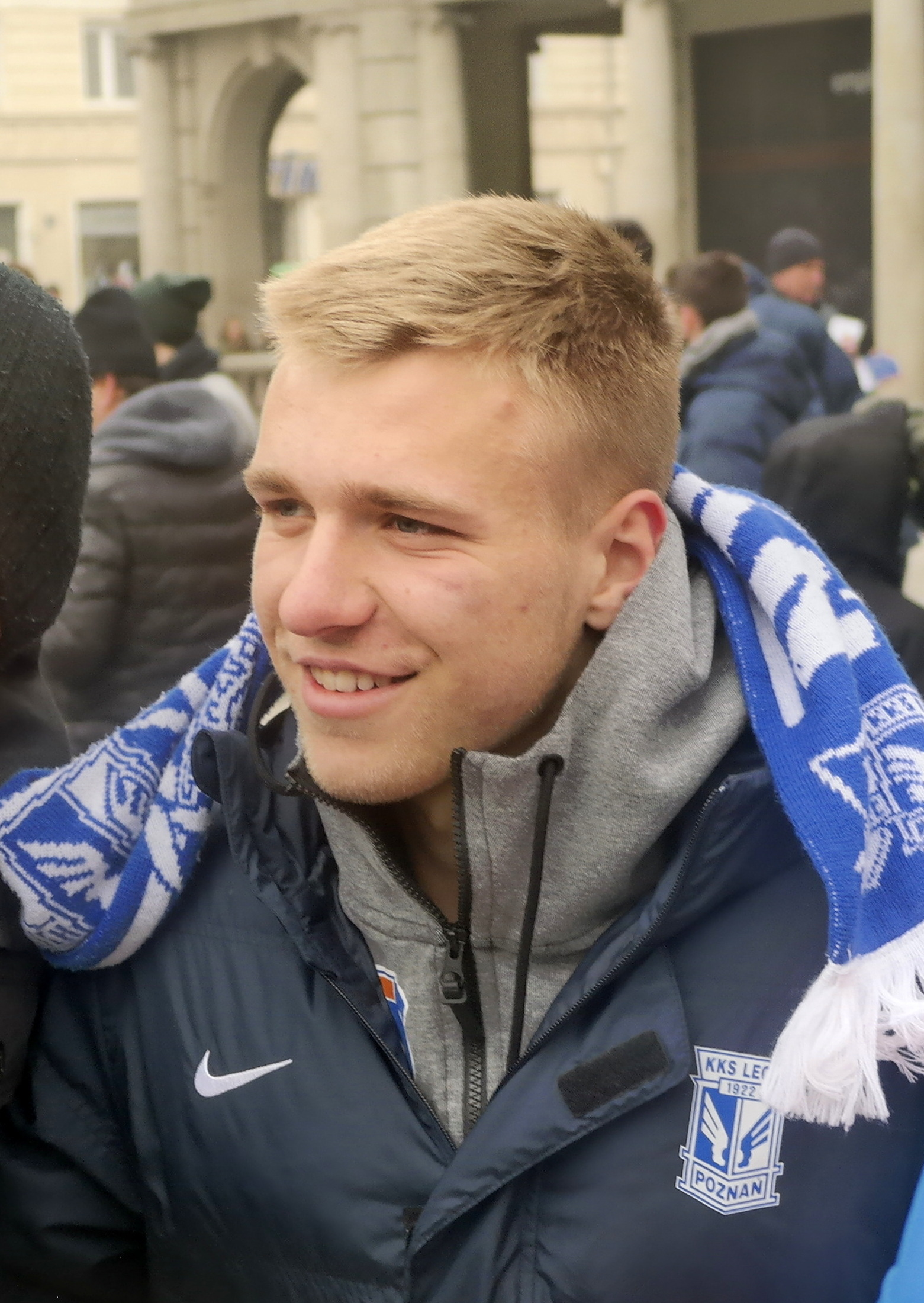
Puchacz with Lech Poznań in 2017

Puchacz started his career with Lech Poznań.

On 15 December 2017, he was loaned to I liga side Zagłębie Sosnowiec.

On 31 August 2018, he was loaned to I liga side GKS Katowice.

On 18 May 2021, Union Berlin signed Puchacz with a transfer fee of €3.5 million. He joined the club for the 2021–22 season.

On 10 January 2022, he was loaned to Süper Lig side Trabzonspor and won the league title months later. The same year on 29 December, his loan to Super League Greece side Panathinaikos was confirmed.

On 19 June 2023, Puchacz was sent to 1. FC Kaiserslautern on another loan. He recorded one goal and thirteen assists in all competitions across the 2023–24 season, as FCK finished the league season in 13th and reached the 2023–24 DFB-Pokal final.

On 2 August 2024, Puchacz joined Bundesliga newcomers Holstein Kiel.

On 9 January 2025, Puchacz moved to EFL League One club Plymouth Argyle on loan for the rest of the 2024–25 season with an option to buy.

In the summer of 2025, Puchacz was approached by Lech Poznań and Slovan Bratislava, but rejected offers from both clubs. On 8 September, the Polish transfer window deadline day, Puchacz was scheduled to undergo a medical ahead of a loan move to GKS Katowice, but pulled out last-minute.

The following day, he joined Sabah on a season-long loan. On 14 May 2026, after winning the domestic double with Sabah, Puchacz joined them on a permanent basis.

== International career ==
Puchacz made his debut for the Poland national team on 1 June 2021, in their 1–1 friendly draw with Russia.

In June 2021, Puchacz made appearances in all of Poland's fixtures at UEFA Euro 2020, as they finished last in their group and were knocked out from the group stages.

On 7 June 2024, he was selected for his second international tournament after being named in the final squad for UEFA Euro 2024 in Germany. He remained benched for all three of Poland's fixtures as they failed to qualify for the knockout phase.

== Career statistics ==
=== Club ===
As of match played 8 November 2026

Appearances and goals by club, season and competition
Club	Season	League			National cup (Note: Includes Polish Cup, DFB-Pokal, Turkish Cup, Greek Football Cup, FA Cup, Azerbaijan Cup)		Europe		Other		Total	
Club	Season	Division	Apps	Goals	Apps	Goals	Apps	Goals	Apps	Goals	Apps	Goals
Lech Poznań II	2015–16	III liga, group C	1	0	—		—		—		1	0
Lech Poznań II	2016–17	III liga, group II	22	2	—		—		—		22	2
Lech Poznań II	2017–18	III liga, group II	16	0	—		—		—		16	0
Lech Poznań II	Total		39	2	—		—		—		39	2
Lech Poznań	2016–17	Ekstraklasa	1	0	0	0	—		0	0	1	0
Lech Poznań	2019–20	Ekstraklasa	35	3	5	1	—		—		40	4
Lech Poznań	2020–21	Ekstraklasa	27	1	4	1	10 (Note: Appearance(s) in UEFA Europa League)	1	—		41	3
Lech Poznań	Total		63	4	9	2	10	1	—		82	7
Zagłębie Sosnowiec (loan)	2017–18	I liga	15	0	—		—		—		15	0
Zagłębie Sosnowiec (loan)	2018–19	Ekstraklasa	2	0	0	0	—		—		2	0
Zagłębie Sosnowiec (loan)	Total		17	0	0	0	—		—		17	0
GKS Katowice (loan)	2018–19	I liga	25	4	2	0	—		—		27	4
Union Berlin	2021–22	Bundesliga	0	0	0	0	7 (Note: Appearances in UEFA Conference League)	0	—		7	0
Union Berlin	2022–23	Bundesliga	1	0	1	1	1	0	—		3	1
Union Berlin	Total		1	0	1	1	8	0	—		10	1
Trabzonspor (loan)	2021–22	Süper Lig	9	0	3	0	0	0	—		12	0
Panathinaikos (loan)	2022–23	Super League Greece	13	0	3	0	—		—		16	0
1. FC Kaiserslautern (loan)	2023–24	2. Bundesliga	31	1	5	0	—		—		36	1
Holstein Kiel	2024–25	Bundesliga	10	0	2	0	—		—		12	0
Plymouth Argyle (loan)	2024–25	EFL Championship	15	0	3	0	—		—		18	0
Sabah (loan)	2025–26	Azerbaijan Premier League	28	0	4	2	—		—		32	2
Sabah	2026–27	Azerbaijan Premier League	10	0	0	0	12 (Note: Appearances in UEFA Champions League)	0	—		22	0
Sabah	Sabah total		38	0	4	2	12	0	—		54	2
Career total			256	11	32	5	30	1	0	0	318	17

=== International ===
As of match played 28 September 2026

Appearances and goals by national team and year
National team	Year	Apps	Goals
Poland	2021	10	0
Poland	2022	2	0
Poland	2024	3	0
Poland	2025	0	0
Poland	2026	1	0
Total		16	0

== Honours ==
Trabzonspor

- Süper Lig: 2021–22

Sabah

- Azerbaijan Premier League: 2025–26
- Azerbaijan Cup: 2025–26
