= Jean Zimmer =

German footballer

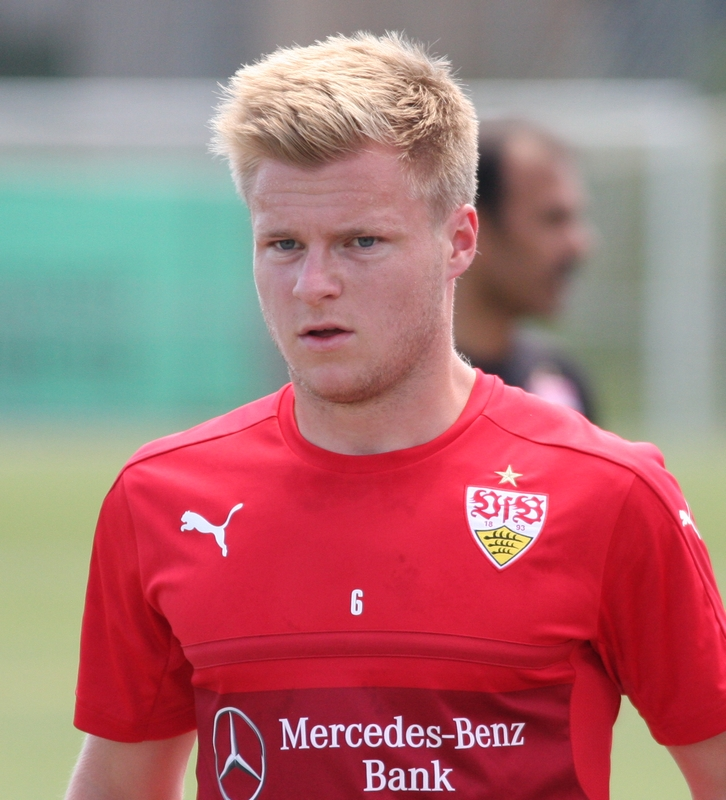
- Zimmer training with VfB Stuttgart in 2016

Personal information
- Date of birth: 6 December 1993 (age 32)
- Place of birth: Bad Dürkheim, Germany
- Height: 1.71 m (5 ft 7 in)
- Position: Right-back

Team information
- Current team: 1. FC Kaiserslautern II
- Number: 8

Youth career
- 2010–2012: 1. FC Kaiserslautern

Senior career*
Years	Team	Apps	(Gls)
2012–2014	1. FC Kaiserslautern II	59	(1)
2013–2016	1. FC Kaiserslautern	61	(5)
2016–2018	VfB Stuttgart	16	(0)
2016	VfB Stuttgart II	1	(0)
2017–2018	→ Fortuna Düsseldorf (loan)	29	(1)
2018–2021	Fortuna Düsseldorf	43	(1)
2021	→ 1. FC Kaiserslautern (loan)	19	(0)
2021–2025	1. FC Kaiserslautern	93	(2)
2025–	1. FC Kaiserslautern II	42	(3)

International career^{‡}
2009	Germany U17	1	(0)
2014–2015	Germany U21	2	(0)
- * Club domestic league appearances and goals as of 24 September 2026 ‡ National team caps and goals as of 09:27, 10 August 2017 (UTC)

Jean Zimmer (born 6 December 1993) is a German professional footballer who plays as a right-back for 1. FC Kaiserslautern II.

== Career ==
Zimmer made his 2. Bundesliga debut on 23 December 2013 in 1. FC Kaiserslautern's 1–2 away win against FC Ingolstadt.

For the 2016–17 season Zimmer moved to VfB Stuttgart. In his first season at the club, he made 16 2. Bundesliga appearances and one in the DFB Pokal.

In August 2017, he joined Fortuna Düsseldorf on loan for the season. On 18 May 2018, Zimmer moved permanently to Düsseldorf.

On 12 January 2021, he rejoined 1. FC Kaiserslautern on loan for the remainder of the season. On 1 July 2021, he returned to Kaiserslautern permanently. He was named club captain upon his return. In the 2023-24 season, he led Kaiserslautern to their first DFB Pokal final since 2002-03.

== Honours ==
1. FC Kaiserslautern

- DFB-Pokal runner-up: 2023–24
