= Julian Krahl =

German football player

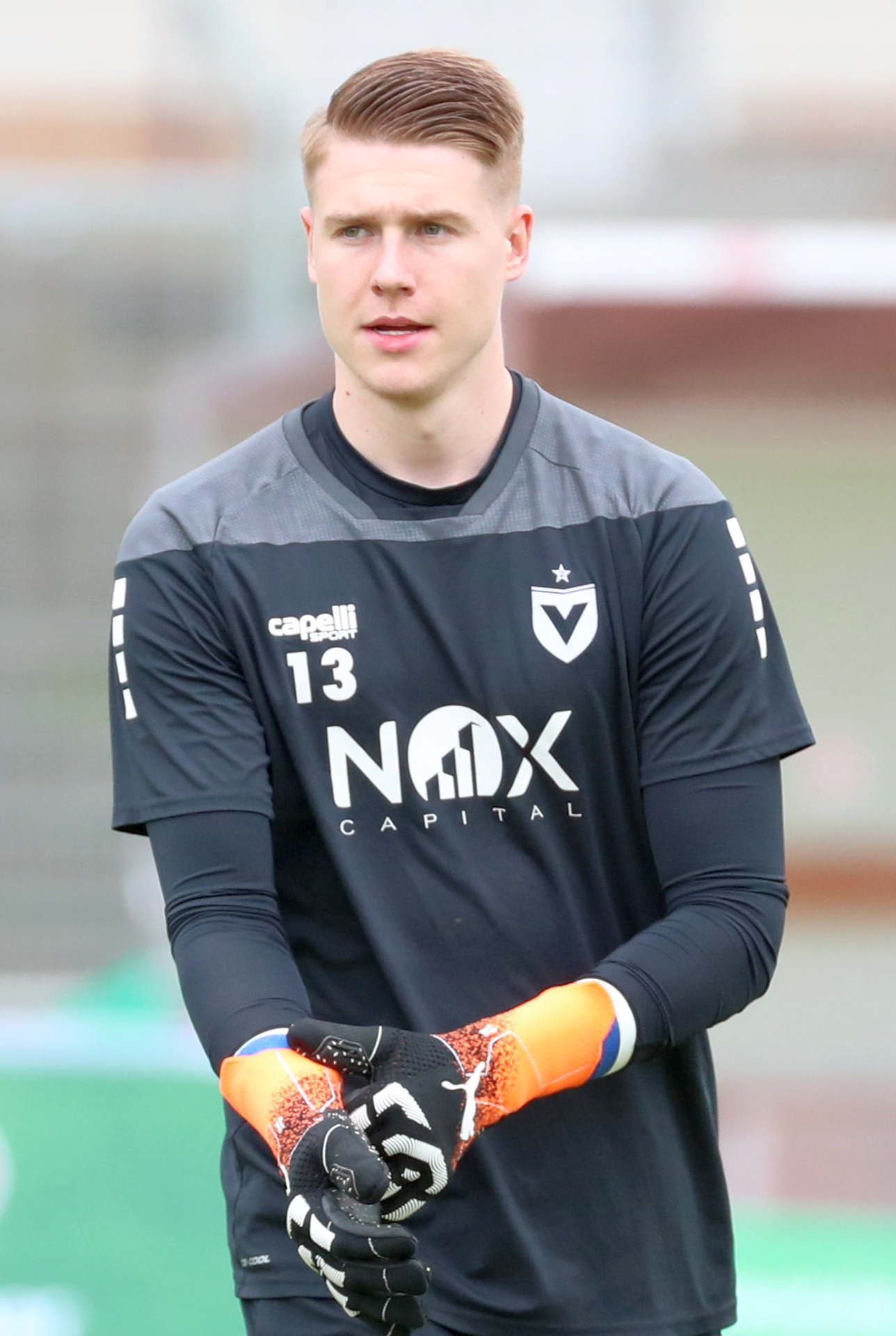
- Krahl with Viktoria Berlin in 2022

Personal information
- Date of birth: 22 January 2000 (age 26)
- Place of birth: Forst (Lausitz), Germany
- Height: 1.94 m (6 ft 4 in)
- Position: Goalkeeper

Team information
- Current team: 1. FC Kaiserslautern
- Number: 1

Senior career*
Years	Team	Apps	(Gls)
2018–2019	RB Leipzig	0	(0)
2019–2021	1. FC Köln	0	(0)
2019–2021	1. FC Köln II	43	(0)
2021–2022	Viktoria Berlin	26	(0)
2022–	1. FC Kaiserslautern	95	(0)
- * Club domestic league appearances and goals as of 18 May 2026

Julian Krahl (born 22 January 2000) is a German footballer who plays as a goalkeeper for 1. FC Kaiserslautern in the 2. Bundesliga.

He spent his early career at RB Leipzig and 1. FC Köln, and did not make a senior appearance for either. After one year in the 3. Liga with FC Viktoria 1889 Berlin he signed for 1. FC Kaiserslautern of the 2. Bundesliga in 2022, going on to become first-choice goalkeeper and play in the 2024 DFB-Pokal final.

== Club career ==
=== RB Leipzig ===
Born in Forst (Lausitz) in the state of Brandenburg, Krahl began his career at RB Leipzig. He was called up once for the first team on 2 August 2018, remaining an unused substitute in a 1–1 draw away to BK Häcken of Sweden in the UEFA Europa League second qualifying round second leg, after a 4–0 win in the first leg.

=== 1. FC Köln ===
In May 2019, Krahl transferred for free to newly promoted Bundesliga team 1. FC Köln, on a three-year deal. Third-choice, he only played for the reserve team in the fourth-tier Regionalliga.

=== 1. FC Kaiserslautern ===
After one year at FC Viktoria 1889 Berlin in the 3. Liga, Krahl joined 1. FC Kaiserslautern in the 2. Bundesliga in June 2022, signing a contract of undisclosed length after previous first-choice goalkeeper Matheo Raab left for Hamburger SV. He played only one league game in the 2022–23 2. Bundesliga as another incomer, veteran Andreas Luthe, was preferred by manager Dirk Schuster.

Krahl had a run in the team at the start of the following season when Luthe was suspended, and kept it when his rival returned. He played 30 games of the league season, only keeping a clean sheet twice; Kicker wrote that he showed some mistakes including in a 3–3 draw with Hamburg, but was not to blame for all 54 goals conceded. He played five games in the DFB-Pokal as the "Red Devils" made the final, losing by a single goal to unbeaten Bundesliga champions Bayer 04 Leverkusen. Two days after the final, his contract was renewed.

== Career statistics ==
As of match played 20 December 2025

Appearances and goals by club, season and competition
Club	Season	League			DFB Pokal		Continental		Other		Total	
Club	Season	Division	Apps	Goals	Apps	Goals	Apps	Goals	Apps	Goals	Apps	Goals
RB Leipzig	2018–19	Bundesliga	0	0	0	0	0	0	—		0	0
1. FC Köln	2019–20	Bundesliga	0	0	0	0	—		—		0	0
1. FC Köln	2020–21	Bundesliga	0	0	0	0	—		0	0	0	0
1. FC Köln	Total		0	0	0	0	—		0	0	0	0
1. FC Köln II	2019–20	Regionalliga West	11	0	—		—		—		11	0
1. FC Köln II	2020–21	Regionalliga West	32	0	—		—		—		32	0
1. FC Köln II	Total		43	0	—		—		—		43	0
Viktoria Berlin	2021–22	3. Liga	26	0	—		—		—		26	0
1. FC Kaiserslautern	2022–23	2. Bundesliga	1	0	0	0	—		—		1	0
1. FC Kaiserslautern	2023–24	2. Bundesliga	30	0	5	0	—		—		35	0
1. FC Kaiserslautern	2024–25	2. Bundesliga	27	0	2	0	—		—		29	0
1. FC Kaiserslautern	2025–26	2. Bundesliga	16	0	1	0	—		—		17	0
1. FC Kaiserslautern	Total		74	0	8	0	—		—		82	0
Career total			143	0	8	0	0	0	0	0	151	0
