= Oliver Fobassam =

German footballer (born 2003)

Personal information
- Full name: Oliver Fobassam Nawé
- Date of birth: 6 April 2003 (age 23)
- Place of birth: Brühl, North Rhine-Westphalia, Germany
- Height: 1.90 m (6 ft 3 in)
- Position: Centre-back

Team information
- Current team: FSV Zwickau
- Number: 22

Youth career
- TSC Euskirchen
- 2017–2018: Bayer Leverkusen
- 2018–2022: VfL Wolfsburg

Senior career*
| Years | Team | Apps | (Gls) |
| 2022–2024 | Greuther Fürth II | 65 | (3) |
| 2022–2024 | Greuther Fürth | 4 | (0) |
| 2024– | FSV Zwickau | 69 | (2) |
- * Club domestic league appearances and goals as of 31 October 2026

Oliver Fobassam Nawé (born 6 April 2003) is a German professional footballer who plays as a centre-back for FSV Zwickau.

== Career ==
Fobassam is a product of the youth academies of Euskirchen, Bayer Leverkusen and VfL Wolfsburg. He transferred to 2. Bundesliga side Greuther Fürth on 26 January 2022, signing a contract until 2024. He made his professional debut with Greuther Fürth as a late substitute in a 1–1 tie with Karlsruher SC in the 2. Bundesliga on 5 August 2022.

== Personal life ==
Fobassam was born in Brühl to a Cameroonian father and a German-French mother.
