= Philipp Klement =

German footballer

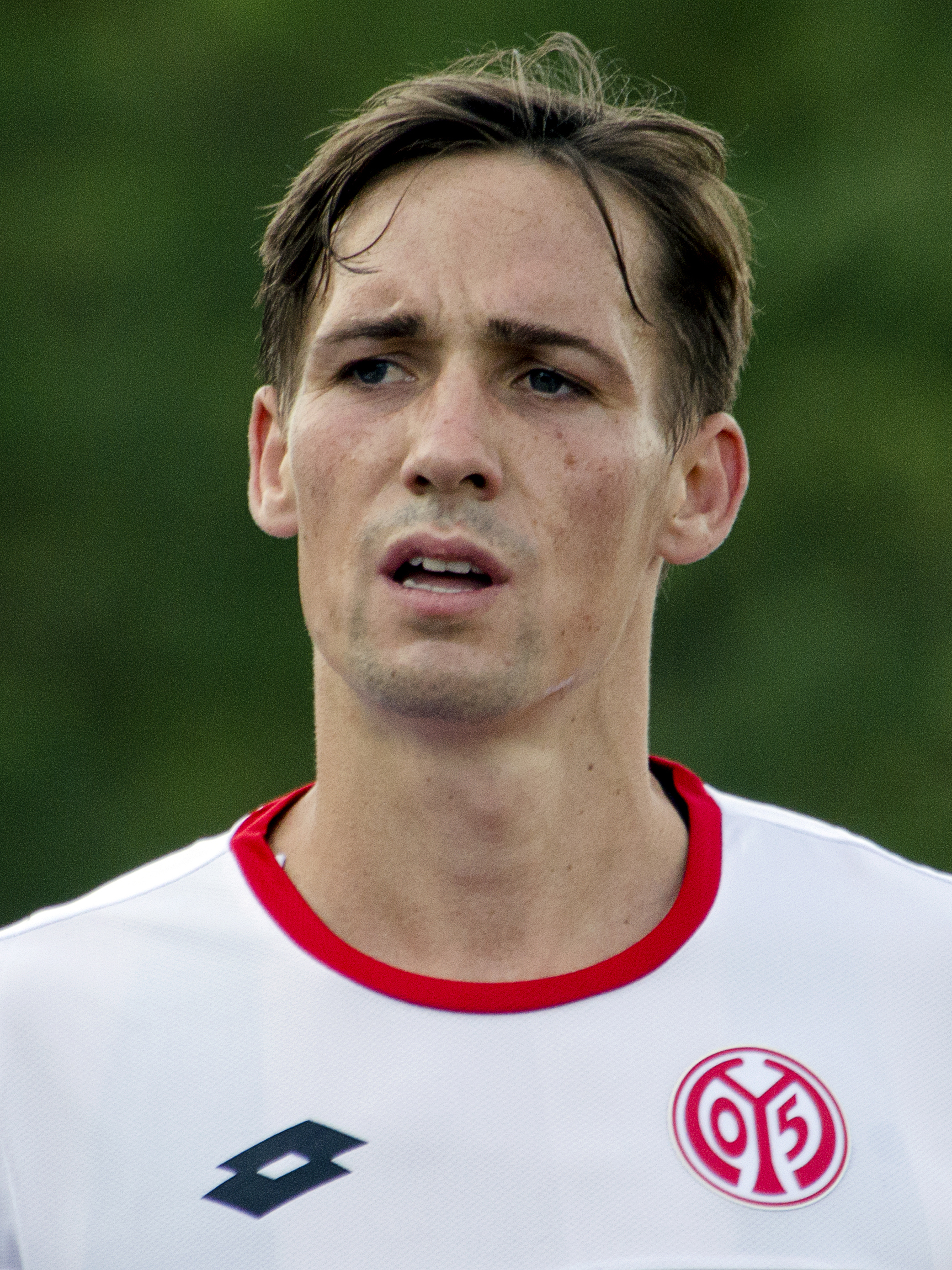
- Klement in 2015

Personal information
- Date of birth: 9 September 1992 (age 34)
- Place of birth: Ludwigshafen, Germany
- Height: 1.75 m (5 ft 9 in)
- Position: Central midfielder

Youth career
- 1995–2004: TuS Wachenheim
- 2004–2010: 1. FC Kaiserslautern

Senior career*
Years	Team	Apps	(Gls)
2010–2011	1. FC Kaiserslautern II	0	(0)
2011–2014	1. FC Nürnberg II	61	(10)
2013	→ Hansa Rostock (loan)	10	(1)
2014–2018	Mainz 05 II	73	(16)
2015–2018	Mainz 05	2	(0)
2018–2019	SC Paderborn	47	(18)
2019–2022	VfB Stuttgart	43	(2)
2021–2022	VfB Stuttgart II	2	(1)
2022	→ SC Paderborn (loan)	11	(2)
2022–2025	1. FC Kaiserslautern	42	(4)
Total		291	(54)

International career
2007–2008	Germany U16	3	(0)
2012	Germany U20	2	(0)
- * Club domestic league appearances and goals as of 23 May 2025

Philipp Klement (born 9 September 1992) is a German professional footballer who plays as a central midfielder.

== Club career ==
On 4 August 2014, it was announced that Klement had joined 1. FSV Mainz 05 II on a one-year deal. Both sides can also extend the contract by an agreed clause. In September 2015, he was promoted to the Mainz first team and made his Bundesliga debut as substitute in an away versus Schalke 04. He participated in the first team's training and continued to play for the second team as well.

In the summer of 2019, Klement moved to VfB Stuttgart.

In January 2022 he joined former club SC Paderborn on loan until the end of the 2021–22 season.

On 25 August 2022, Klement returned to 1. FC Kaiserslautern.

== Career statistics ==
As of match played 25 May 2024

Appearances and goals by club, season and competition
Club	Season	League			Cup		Total	
Club	Season	Division	Apps	Goals	Apps	Goals	Apps	Goals
1. FC Nürnberg II	2011–12	Regionalliga Süd	19	3	—		19	3
1. FC Nürnberg II	2012–13	Regionalliga Bayern	15	1	—		15	1
1. FC Nürnberg II	2013–14	Regionalliga Bayern	28	6	—		28	6
1. FC Nürnberg II	Total		62	10	—		62	10
Hansa Rostock (loan)	2012–13	3. Liga	10	1	—		10	1
1. FSV Mainz 05 II	2014–15	3. Liga	32	5	—		32	5
1. FSV Mainz 05 II	2015–16	3. Liga	16	6	—		16	6
1. FSV Mainz 05 II	2016–17	3. Liga	24	5	—		24	5
1. FSV Mainz 05 II	2017–18	Regionalliga Südwest	1	0	—		1	0
1. FSV Mainz 05 II	Total		73	16	—		73	16
1. FSV Mainz 05	2015–16	Bundesliga	2	0	0	0	2	0
1. FSV Mainz 05	2017–18	Bundesliga	0	0	1	0	1	0
1. FSV Mainz 05	Total		2	0	1	0	3	0
SC Paderborn 07	2017–18	3. Liga	16	2	1	0	17	2
SC Paderborn 07	2018–19	2. Bundesliga	31	16	4	0	35	16
SC Paderborn 07	Total		47	18	5	0	52	18
VfB Stuttgart	2019–20	2. Bundesliga	19	0	2	0	21	0
VfB Stuttgart	2020–21	Bundesliga	18	1	1	0	19	1
VfB Stuttgart	2021–22	Bundesliga	6	1	1	0	7	1
VfB Stuttgart	Total		43	2	4	0	47	2
VfB Stuttgart II	2021–22	Regionalliga Südwest	1	1	—		1	1
VfB Stuttgart II	2022–23	Regionalliga Südwest	1	0	—		1	0
VfB Stuttgart II	Total		2	1	—		2	1
SC Paderborn 07 (loan)	2021–22	2. Bundesliga	11	1	0	0	11	1
1. FC Kaiserslautern	2022–23	2. Bundesliga	24	3	0	0	24	3
1. FC Kaiserslautern	2023–24	2. Bundesliga	12	0	1	0	13	0
1. FC Kaiserslautern	Total		36	3	1	0	37	3
Career Total			275	52	11	0	286	52
