= Béla Réthy =

German sports reporter (born 1956)

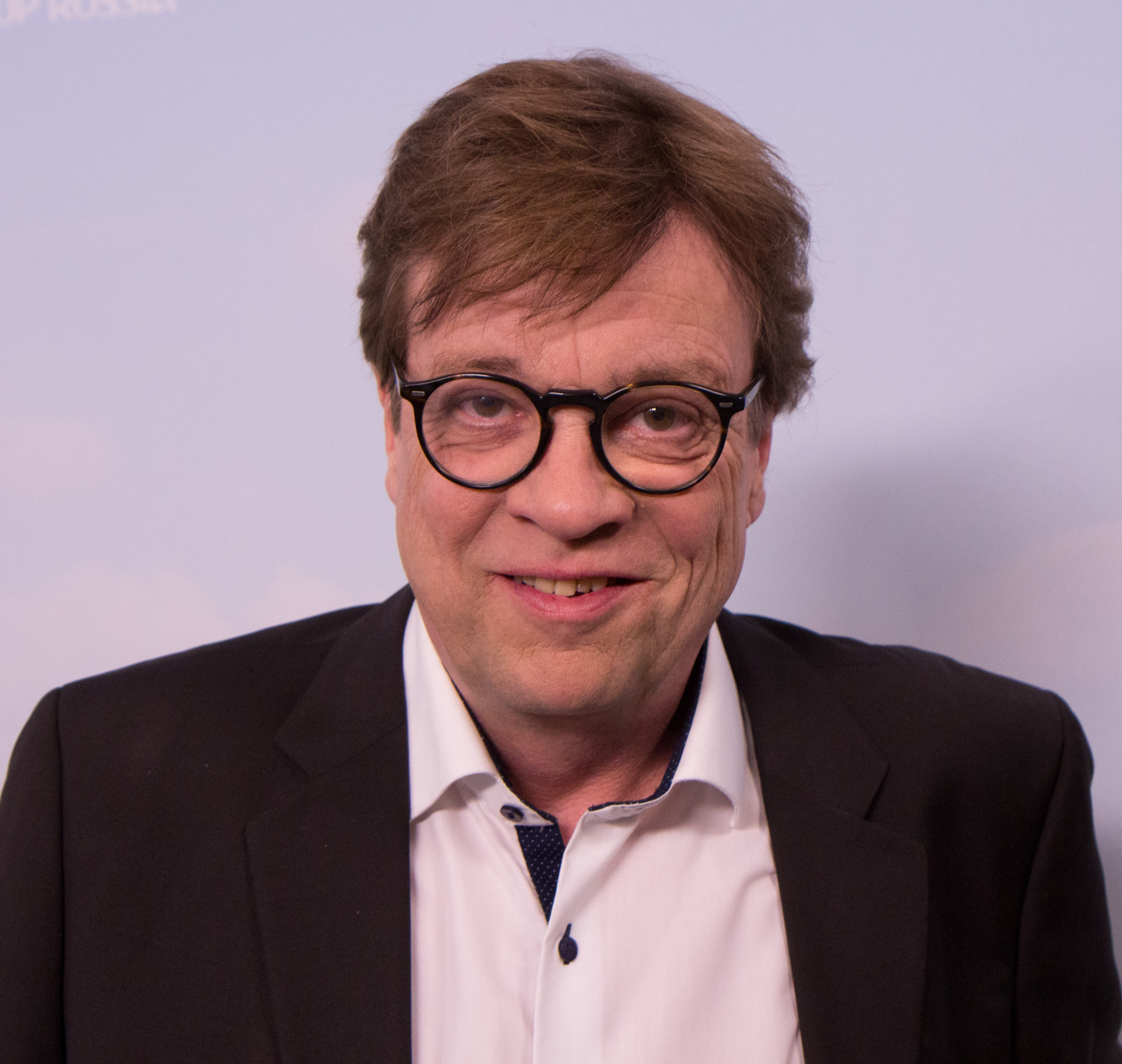
Réthy in 2018

Béla Andreas Réthy (born 14 December 1956) is a German sports reporter.

== Life ==
When Réthy was born in Vienna, his parents had to leave their home country because of the 1956 Hungarian Revolution. They emigrated to Brazil where they stayed until they went to Germany in 1968. Réthy obtained his Abitur certificate at Gutenbergschule Wiesbaden so he was able to attend Johannes Gutenberg University Mainz where he studied literature and journalism. In the meantime he worked in the sports archive of the ZDF and became a freelancer later. Since 1987, he has been a full-time broadcaster.

His first live broadcast was during an international football match between the under-16 teams of Germany and Ireland in 1991. He has commentated at the finals of:

- the Euro 1996 (Germany vs. Czech Republic) in England
- the 2002 FIFA World Cup (Germany vs. Brazil) in Japan and South Korea
- the Euro 2004 (Portugal vs. Greece) in Portugal
- the 2010 FIFA World Cup (Spain vs. Netherlands) in South Africa
- the Euro 2012 (Spain vs. Italy) in Poland and Ukraine
- the 2018 FIFA World Cup (France vs. Croatia) in Russia

In addition, he has also commentated the UEFA Champions League finals of 2013, 2014 and 2015.

Réthy speaks German, Hungarian, Portuguese and English fluently, as well as French and Spanish.

== Books ==
- Réthy, Béla; Psotta, Kai (2014). Live die Länderspiele meines Lebens (in German). Köln: Lübbe. ISBN 978-3-7857-2496-5. OCLC 864650341.
