= Armindo Sieb =

German footballer (born 2003)

- Sieb in 2026

Personal information
- Full name: Armindo Sieb
- Date of birth: 17 February 2003 (age 23)
- Place of birth: Halle, Germany
- Height: 1.75 m (5 ft 9 in)
- Positions: Forward; attacking midfielder; winger

Team information
- Current team: Los Angeles FC
- Number: 9

Youth career
- 2010–2014: SG Motor Halle
- 2014–2017: RB Leipzig
- 2017–2020: TSG Hoffenheim
- 2020: Bayern Munich

Senior career*
Years	Team	Apps	(Gls)
2020–2022	Bayern Munich II	45	(12)
2020–2022	Bayern Munich	0	(0)
2022–2024	Greuther Fürth	63	(16)
2022–2024	Greuther Fürth II	1	(0)
2024–2026	Bayern Munich	0	(0)
2024–2026	→ Mainz 05 (loan)	49	(4)
2026–	Los Angeles FC	10	(1)

International career^{‡}
2018–2019	Germany U16	10	(2)
2019–2020	Germany U17	9	(6)
2020	Germany U18	2	(0)
2021–2022	Germany U19	11	(4)
2022–2023	Germany U20	9	(2)
2024	Germany U21	2	(0)
- * Club domestic league appearances and goals as of 23:45, 1 November 2026 (UTC) ‡ National team caps and goals as of 17:57, 5 September 2024 (UTC)

Armindo Sieb (born 17 February 2003) is a German professional footballer who plays as a forward, attacking midfielder, and winger for Major League Soccer club Los Angeles FC. He is a former German youth international.

== Club career ==
=== Early career ===
Sieb began his youth career at hometown club SG Motor Halle, and later played for the academies of both RB Leipzig and TSG Hoffenheim.

=== Bayern Munich ===
On 2020, he joined the Bayern Munich youth academy, signing a three-year contract.

On 15 October 2020, Sieb made his debut for Bayern Munich's senior side during a 3–0 win against fifth-division side 1. FC Düren in the first round of the 2020–21 DFB-Pokal. This was due to the fact that the match, which had been rescheduled from an earlier date, took place immediately following an national team break, resulting in Bayern Munich resting their national team players for the fixture. He was substituted on in the 61st minute for Douglas Costa, but an ankle ligament injury forced him to be substitution in the 87th minute for Daniels Ontužāns. The appearance made Sieb the third-youngest Bayern player to appear in the DFB-Pokal at the age of 17 years and 241 days, only behind Jamal Musiala (17 years, 232 days; in the starting line-up of the match) and David Alaba (17 years, 231 days). However, the injury left him out until December, but did not require surgery.

He made his 3. Liga debut for Bayern Munich II on 13 February 2021, coming on as a substitute for Dimitri Oberlin in the second minute of second-half stoppage time against 1. FC Kaiserslautern. The away match finished as a 1–1 draw for Bayern II. In total, Sieb made 12 appearances in the 3. Liga that season, in which he scored two goals. With the reserves, however, he suffered relegation to the Regionalliga Bayern. As part of the U19 team, he was no longer utilised, also because the season in the youth leagues was discontinued from November 2020 due to the COVID-19 pandemic.

Sieb started the 2021–22 season with the reserves in the Regionalliga. He also appeared for the U19 team in the UEFA Youth League.

=== Greuther Fürth ===
On 24 June 2022, Sieb signed a three-year contract until 2025 with 2. Bundesliga club Greuther Fürth, with Bayern Munich securing an exclusive future buy-back option.

==== Return to Bayern Munich and loan to Mainz 05 ====
On 1 July 2024, he moved back to Bayern Munich on a contract until 2027 for a €1.5 million estimated fee, and immediately joined fellow Bundesliga club Mainz 05 on a two-year loan.

=== Los Angeles FC ===
On 13 August 2026, Sieb transferred permanently to Major League Soccer club Los Angeles FC, signing a contract through the 2028–29 season with a club option through 2029–30.

== International career ==
He is of German and Mozambican Malagasy roots through his parents. Sieb began his youth international career with Germany's under-16 team, making ten appearances and scoring two goals from 2018 to 2019. He made nine appearances and scored six goals for the under-17 team, and appeared twice for the under-18 team.

== Career statistics ==
As of match played 9 September 2026

Appearances and goals by club, season and competition
Club	Season	League			National cup (Note: Includes DFB-Pokal)		Continental		Total	
Club	Season	Division	Apps	Goals	Apps	Goals	Apps	Goals	Apps	Goals
Bayern Munich II	2020–21	3. Liga	12	2	—		—		12	2
Bayern Munich II	2021–22	Regionalliga Bayern	33	10	—		—		33	10
Bayern Munich II	Total		45	12	—		—		45	12
Bayern Munich	2020–21	Bundesliga	0	0	1	0	0	0	1	0
Greuther Fürth	2022–23	2. Bundesliga	30	4	1	0	—		31	4
Greuther Fürth	2023–24	2. Bundesliga	33	12	2	1	—		35	13
Greuther Fürth	Total		63	16	3	1	—		66	17
Greuther Fürth II	2022–23	Regionalliga Bayern	1	0	0	0	—		1	0
Mainz 05 (loan)	2024–25	Bundesliga	27	2	2	0	—		29	2
Mainz 05 (loan)	2025–26	Bundesliga	22	2	2	0	8 (Note: Appearances in UEFA Conference League)	0	32	2
Mainz 05 (loan)	Total		49	4	4	0	8	0	61	4
Los Angeles FC	2026	Major League Soccer	2	1	—		—		2	1
Career total			160	33	8	1	8	0	176	34
