= Ragnar Ache =

German association football player

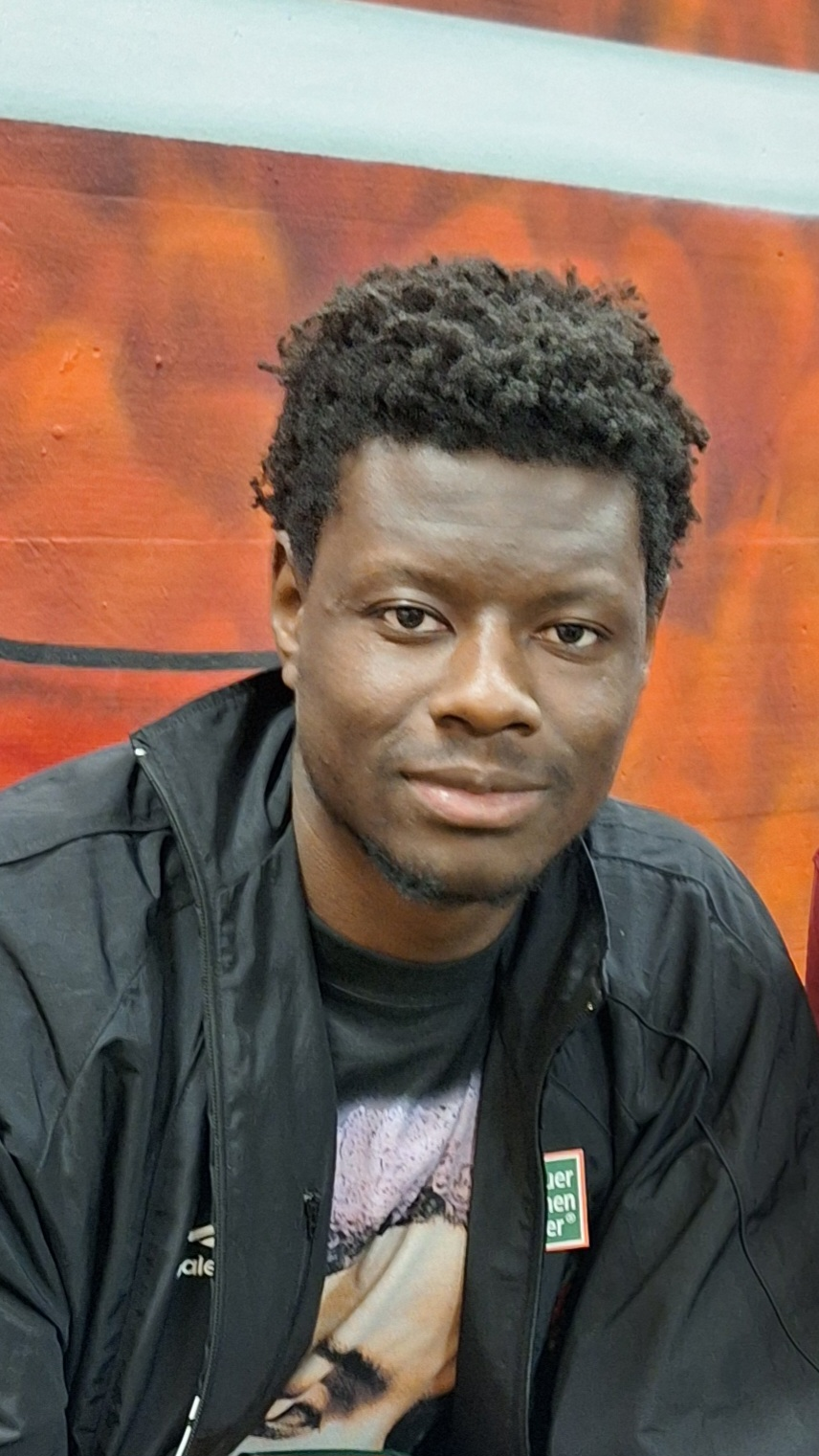
- Ache in 2024

Personal information
- Full name: Ragnar Prince Friedel Ache
- Date of birth: 28 July 1998 (age 28)
- Place of birth: Frankfurt, Germany
- Height: 1.83 m (6 ft 0 in)
- Position: Forward

Team information
- Current team: 1. FC Köln
- Number: 9

Youth career
- –2009: SpVgg 03 Neu-Isenburg
- 2009–2010: Sparta AV
- 2010–2017: Sparta Rotterdam

Senior career*
Years	Team	Apps	(Gls)
2017–2020	Sparta Rotterdam	50	(12)
2017–2020	Jong Sparta Rotterdam	39	(11)
2020–2023	Eintracht Frankfurt	20	(1)
2022–2023	→ Greuther Fürth (loan)	32	(7)
2023–2025	1. FC Kaiserslautern	56	(34)
2025–	1. FC Köln	33	(8)

International career
2019–2020	Germany U21	3	(1)
2021	Germany Olympic	3	(2)
- * Club domestic league appearances and goals as of 19 September 2026

Ragnar Prince Friedel Ache (born 28 July 1998) is a German professional footballer who plays as a forward for Bundesliga club 1. FC Köln.

== Club career ==
Born in Frankfurt, Germany, Ache started his career in the youth ranks of Dutch side Sparta Rotterdam. He made his debut for the club's reserve side, Jong Sparta, in the Tweede Divisie on 20 August 2016 against TEC. He came on as a 66th-minute substitute for Ugur Altintas and scored a goal in the 66th minute as Jong Sparta drew the match 2–2. He would go on to score seven goals in 17 appearances for the Sparta Rotterdam reserve side for the 2016–17 season.

On 4 April 2017, after good performances for Jong Sparta, Ache made his debut for the senior side in the Eredivisie against Heerenveen. He came on as substitute for Ilias Alhaft in the 80th minute as Sparta Rotterdam lost 3–0. That would be his only appearance with the senior side that season. At the start of the 2017–18 season, Ache was put into the first-team and came on as a substitute for Craig Goodwin in Sparta Rotterdam's 3–0 defeat at VVV-Venlo in the opening game of the season. On 25 August 2017, Ache scored his first two professional goals for Sparta Rotterdam, grabbing a brace in the club's 2–2 draw away at NAC Breda. Ache came onto the pitch in the 52nd minute with Sparta Rotterdam down 2–0 and scored in the 70th and 84th minutes of the match.

=== Eintracht Frankfurt ===
On 3 January 2020, Ache signed a five-year contract with German club Eintracht Frankfurt. He made his first appearance for the club on 25 September 2020 against Hertha BSC, coming on as a 66th-minute substitute as Eintracht Frankfurt won 3–1.

On 14 June 2022, Ache was loaned to Greuther Fürth for the season.

=== Kaiserslautern ===
On 25 July 2023, 2. Bundesliga side 1. FC Kaiserslautern announced the signing of Ache for a reported fee of €1 million.

=== FC Köln ===
On 27 May 2025, Ache signed a contract with 1. FC Köln until 2029.

== International career ==
Born in Germany, Ache is of Ghanaian descent. He is a youth international for Germany.

On 9 July 2021, Ache and Keven Schlotterbeck were nominated to join the German Olympic team for the 2020 Summer Olympics, after Josha Vagnoman and Niklas Dorsch withdrew. In the opening game of Group D of the competition on 22 July, coming on as a substitute in the second half, Ache scored the second of Germany's two goals in a 4–2 loss to Brazil. He would score again in the second match, giving Germany a 2–1 lead in an eventual 3–2 win over Saudi Arabia.

== Career statistics ==
As of match played 19 September 2026

Appearances and goals by club, season and competition
Club	Season	League			National cup (Note: Includes KNVB Cup, DFB-Pokal)		Continental		Other		Total	
Club	Season	Division	Apps	Goals	Apps	Goals	Apps	Goals	Apps	Goals	Apps	Goals
Jong Sparta	2016–17	Tweede Divisie	17	7	—		—		—		17	7
Jong Sparta	2017–18	Tweede Divisie	14	3	—		—		—		14	3
Jong Sparta	2018–19	Tweede Divisie	8	1	—		—		—		8	1
Jong Sparta	Total		39	11	0	0	0	0	0	0	39	11
Sparta Rotterdam	2016–17	Eredivisie	1	0	0	0	—		—		1	0
Sparta Rotterdam	2017–18	Eredivisie	19	2	1	0	—		—		20	2
Sparta Rotterdam	2018–19	Eerste Divisie	11	5	0	0	—		4 (Note: Appearances in promotion/relegation play-offs)	2	15	7
Sparta Rotterdam	2019–20	Eredivisie	19	5	2	0	—		0	0	21	5
Sparta Rotterdam	Total		50	12	3	0	0	0	4	2	57	14
Eintracht Frankfurt	2020–21	Bundesliga	7	1	0	0	—		—		7	1
Eintracht Frankfurt	2021–22	Bundesliga	13	0	0	0	3 (Note: Appearances in UEFA Europa League)	0	—		16	0
Eintracht Frankfurt	Total		20	1	0	0	3	0	0	0	23	1
Greuther Fürth (loan)	2022–23	2. Bundesliga	32	7	1	0	—		—		33	7
1. FC Kaiserslautern	2023–24	2. Bundesliga	26	16	3	1	—		—		29	17
1. FC Kaiserslautern	2024–25	2. Bundesliga	30	18	2	0	—		—		32	18
1. FC Kaiserslautern	Total		56	34	5	1	—		—		61	35
1. FC Köln	2025–26	Bundesliga	29	7	2	1	—		—		31	8
1. FC Köln	2026–27	Bundesliga	4	1	1	0	—		—		5	1
1. FC Köln	Total		33	8	3	1	—		—		36	9
Career total			229	72	12	2	3	0	4	2	248	76

== Honours ==
Eintracht Frankfurt

- UEFA Europa League: 2021–22

1. FC Kaiserslautern

- DFB-Pokal runner-up: 2023–24

Individual

- Bundesliga Goal of the Month: February 2026
- Bundesliga Goal of the Season: 2025–26
