= Kevin Kraus =

German footballer (born 1992)

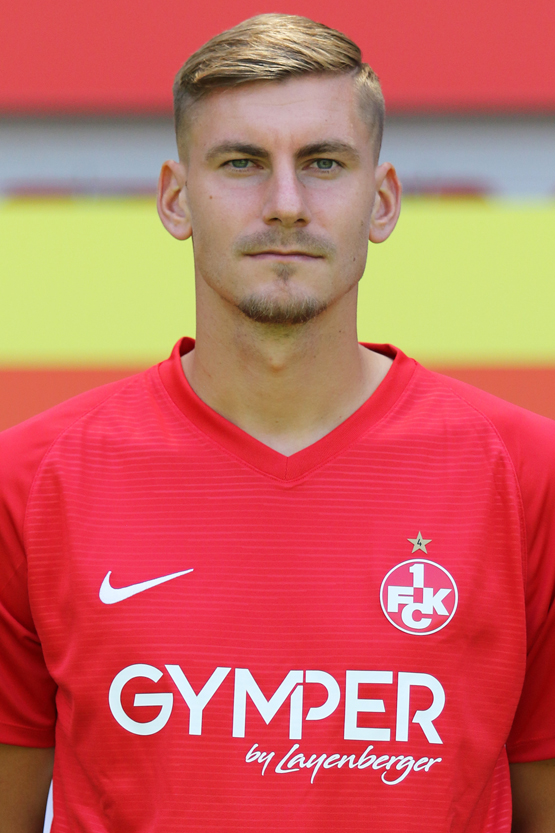
- Kraus in 2019

Personal information
- Date of birth: 12 August 1992 (age 34)
- Place of birth: Wiesbaden, Germany
- Height: 1.90 m (6 ft 3 in)
- Positions: Centre back; right back

Youth career
- –2004: SV Wehen Wiesbaden
- 2004–2010: Eintracht Frankfurt

Senior career*
| Years | Team | Apps | (Gls) |
| 2010–2011 | Eintracht Frankfurt II | 24 | (1) |
| 2011 | Eintracht Frankfurt | 1 | (0) |
| 2011–2014 | Greuther Fürth | 9 | (1) |
| 2011–2014 | Greuther Fürth II | 15 | (2) |
| 2013 | → 1. FC Heidenheim (loan) | 17 | (5) |
| 2014–2018 | 1. FC Heidenheim | 88 | (5) |
| 2018–2024 | 1. FC Kaiserslautern | 166 | (12) |

International career
| 2011 | Germany U-19 | 2 | (0) |
- * Club domestic league appearances and goals as of 22 May 2024

Kevin Kraus (born 12 August 1992) is a German professional footballer who plays as a centre back.

== Career ==
Kraus passed through the youth teams of Eintracht Frankfurt and in 2011 got a roster spot in the senior team, making his debut against Hannover on 16 January 2011.

In summer 2011, Kraus joined 2. Bundesliga club SpVgg Greuther Fürth on a three-year contract.

On 13 May 2014, he signed a two-year contract with 1. FC Heidenheim.

== Honours ==
Greuther Fürth

- 2. Bundesliga: 2011–12
