= Boris Tomiak =

German footballer

Personal information
- Date of birth: 11 September 1998 (age 28)
- Place of birth: Essen, Germany
- Height: 1.93 m (6 ft 4 in)
- Position: Centre-back

Team information
- Current team: Hannover 96
- Number: 3

Youth career
- FC Stoppenberg
- SSV Rotthausen
- –2012: Rot-Weiss Essen
- 2012–2016: Schalke 04
- 2016–2017: Rot-Weiss Essen

Senior career*
Years	Team	Apps	(Gls)
2017–2019	Rot-Weiss Essen	25	(1)
2019	Wattenscheid 09	10	(0)
2020	Altona 93	1	(0)
2020–2021	Fortuna Düsseldorf II	27	(2)
2021–2024	1. FC Kaiserslautern	113	(16)
2025–	Hannover 96	36	(3)
- * Club domestic league appearances and goals as of 18 May 2026

Boris Tomiak (born 11 September 1998) is a German professional footballer who plays as a centre-back for 2. Bundesliga club Hannover 96.

== Career ==
Born in Essen, Tomiak played youth football for FC Stoppenberg, SSV Rotthausen and Rot-Weiss Essen before moving to Schalke 04 in 2012. He returned to Rot-Weiss Essen in 2016, and was promoted to Essen's first team in February 2017. He made his debut for the club on 8 April 2017 in a 1–1 draw with Borussia Dortmund II in the Regionalliga West. He scored once in 25 appearances for Rot-Weiss Essen before leaving the club in summer 2019.

Tomiak joined Wattenscheid 09 in June 2019. He made ten appearances for the club in the Regionalliga West, but the club were withdrawn from the Regionalliga West in October 2019 due to insolvency. He joined Altona 93 for the second half of the season, where he made 1 appearance.

In May 2020, it was announced that Tomiak would join Fortuna Düsseldorf II for the 2020–21 season. He appeared 27 times in the Regionalliga West during the 2020–21 season. In summer 2021, he joined 1. FC Kaiserslautern of the 3. Liga on a free transfer, with his contract at Fortuna having expired. He made his debut for the club in a 0–0 draw with Eintracht Braunschweig on 24 July 2021. He extended his contract with the club in January 2023.

In January 2025, with his Kaiserslautern contract running out in the summer, Tomiak joined Hannover 96 on a three-and-a-half-year contract. The transfer fee paid to Kaiserslautern was undisclosed.

== Honours ==
1. FC Kaiserslautern

- DFB-Pokal runner-up: 2023–24
