= Aaron Opoku =

German footballer

Personal information
- Full name: Aaron Opoku-Tiawiah
- Date of birth: 28 March 1999 (age 27)
- Place of birth: Hamburg, Germany
- Height: 1.85 m (6 ft 1 in)
- Position: Left winger

Team information
- Current team: Eintracht Braunschweig
- Number: 17

Youth career
- –2011: HNT Hamburg
- 2011–2018: Hamburger SV

Senior career*
Years	Team	Apps	(Gls)
2018–2021	Hamburger SV II	23	(2)
2019–2022	Hamburger SV	4	(0)
2019–2020	→ Hansa Rostock (loan)	33	(5)
2020–2021	→ Jahn Regensburg (loan)	21	(1)
2021–2022	→ VfL Osnabrück (loan)	32	(3)
2022–2025	1. FC Kaiserslautern	55	(7)
2025–2026	Kayserispor	19	(0)
2026–	Eintracht Braunschweig	9	(1)

International career
2018	Germany U19	1	(0)
2019	Germany U20	6	(0)
- * Club domestic league appearances and goals as of 18 May 2026

Aaron Opoku-Tiawiah (born 28 March 1999) is a German professional footballer who plays as a left winger for 2. Bundesliga club Eintracht Braunschweig.

== Career ==
Opoku made his professional debut for Hansa Rostock in the 3. Liga on 20 July 2019, starting in the home match against Viktoria Köln. He scored with a backheel in the 19th minute to put Rostock 3–0 ahead, before being substituted out in the 67th minute for Marco Königs, with the match finishing as a 3–3 draw.

He was loaned to Jahn Regensburg for the 2020–21 season.

On 31 August 2022, Opoku signed with 1. FC Kaiserslautern.

In August 2025, the player moved to Central Anatolian side Kayserispor, signing a two year contract.

On 2 February 2026, Opoku returned to Germany and signed a two-and-a-half-year contract with Eintracht Braunschweig.

== Personal life ==
Opoku was born in Hamburg, Germany and is of Ghanaian descent.
