= Tobias Raschl =

German footballer (born 2000)

Personal information
- Date of birth: 21 February 2000 (age 26)
- Place of birth: Düsseldorf, Germany
- Height: 1.77 m (5 ft 10 in)
- Position: Midfielder

Team information
- Current team: Dynamo Dresden
- Number: 21

Youth career
- –2011: SG Unterrath
- 2011–2013: Borussia Mönchengladbach
- 2013–2015: Fortuna Düsseldorf
- 2015–2019: Borussia Dortmund

Senior career*
Years	Team	Apps	(Gls)
2019–2022	Borussia Dortmund II	66	(14)
2019–2022	Borussia Dortmund	1	(0)
2022–2023	Greuther Fürth	39	(2)
2023–2026	1. FC Kaiserslautern	47	(2)
2026	Preußen Münster	7	(0)
2026–	Dynamo Dresden	0	(0)

International career^{‡}
2015	Germany U16	2	(0)
2018	Germany U19	1	(0)
- * Club domestic league appearances and goals as of 18 May 2026 ‡ National team caps and goals as of 22:25, 27 June 2020 (UTC)

Tobias Raschl (born 21 February 2000) is a German professional footballer who plays as a midfielder for 2. Bundesliga club Dynamo Dresden.

== Club career ==
Raschl had been a part of the youth teams of SG Unterrath, Borussia Mönchengladbach and Fortuna Düsseldorf before joining Borussia Dortmund in 2015. He started playing for the BVB youth teams from the 2015–16 season and was the stand-in captain of the under-19 side that won the Bundesliga U-19 championship in 2018–19.

Raschl scored goals against FC Barcelona in the UEFA Youth League in 2019–20, in both the home and away legs of the group stage fixtures. He had featured in the senior team friendlies against Seattle Sounders FC and FC Schweinberg in 2019, but he had to await an opportunity to make a senior team appearance until the end of the season. On 27 June 2020, Raschl played his first Bundesliga game in the last fixture of the 2019–20 season against 1899 Hoffenheim, when he substituted Leonardo Balerdi in the 65th minute as his team was trailing 4–0.

Raschl joined Greuther Fürth on 31 January 2022, the last day of the 2022 winter transfer window. He signed a contract until 2024.

On 1 February 2026, Raschl signed a contract with Preußen Münster until 30 June 2026.

On 24 June 2026, Raschl moved to Dynamo Dresden in 2. Bundesliga.

== Career statistics ==
=== Club ===
As of 1 February 2022

Appearances and goals by club, season and competition
Club	Season	League			Cup		Continental		Other		Total	
Club	Season	Division	Apps	Goals	Apps	Goals	Apps	Goals	Apps	Goals	Apps	Goals
Borussia Dortmund	2019–20	Bundesliga	1	0	0	0	–		0	0	1	0
Borussia Dortmund II	2019–20	Regionalliga West	15	2	–		–		0	0	15	2
Borussia Dortmund II	2020–21	Regionalliga West	29	9	–		–		0	0	29	9
Borussia Dortmund II	2021–22	3. Liga	22	3	–		–		0	0	22	3
Borussia Dortmund II	Total		66	14	0	0	0	0	0	0	66	14
Greuther Fürth	2021–22	Bundesliga	10	0	0	0	–		–		10	0
Greuther Fürth	2022–23	2. Bundesliga	14	1	1	0	–		–		15	1
Greuther Fürth	Total		24	1	1	0	0	0	0	0	25	1
Career total			91	15	1	0	0	0	0	0	92	15
