= Marlon Ritter =

German footballer

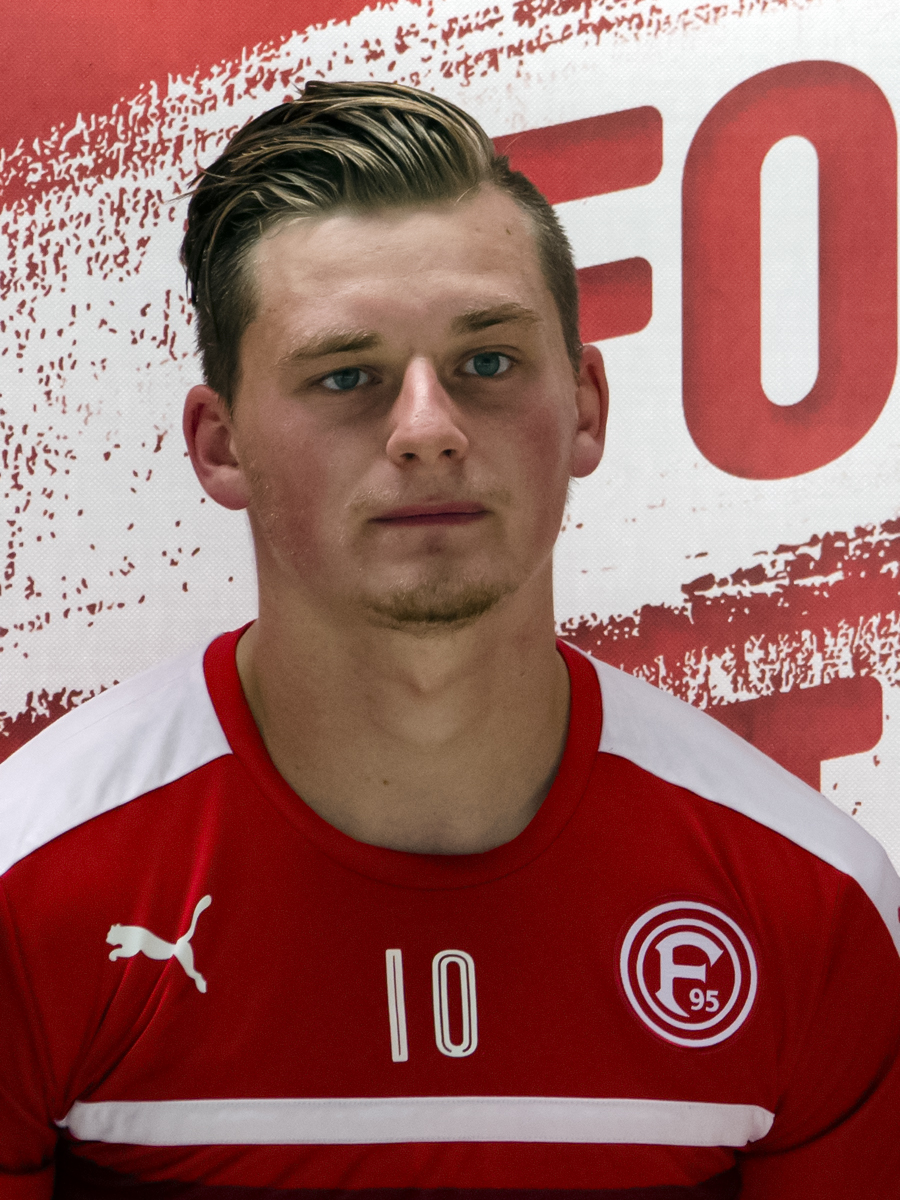
- Ritter with Fortuna Düsseldorf in 2016

Personal information
- Full name: Marlon Ritter
- Date of birth: 15 October 1994 (age 32)
- Place of birth: Essen, Germany
- Height: 1.73 m (5 ft 8 in)
- Position: Midfielder

Team information
- Current team: 1. FC Kaiserslautern
- Number: 7

Youth career
- 2010–2011: Rot-Weiss Essen
- 2011–2012: Borussia Mönchengladbach

Senior career*
Years	Team	Apps	(Gls)
2012–2016	Borussia Mönchengladbach II	94	(43)
2016–2018	Fortuna Düsseldorf	5	(0)
2017–2018	→ SC Paderborn (loan)	29	(12)
2018–2020	SC Paderborn	30	(2)
2020–	1. FC Kaiserslautern	189	(37)
- * Club domestic league appearances and goals as of 18 May 2026

Marlon Ritter (born 15 October 1994) is a German professional footballer who plays as a midfielder for 2. Bundesliga side 1. FC Kaiserslautern.

== Honours ==
1. FC Kaiserslautern

- DFB-Pokal runner-up: 2023–24
