= Julian Niehues =

German footballer

Personal information
- Date of birth: 17 April 2001 (age 25)
- Place of birth: Münster, Germany
- Height: 1.95 m (6 ft 5 in)
- Position: Midfielder

Team information
- Current team: 1. FC Heidenheim
- Number: 16

Youth career
- –2018: Preußen Münster
- 2018–2020: Borussia Mönchengladbach

Senior career*
Years	Team	Apps	(Gls)
2020–2021	Borussia Mönchengladbach II	39	(5)
2021–2024	1. FC Kaiserslautern	72	(4)
2024–	1. FC Heidenheim	36	(4)
- * Club domestic league appearances and goals as of 20 September 2026

Julian Niehues (born 17 April 2001) is a German professional footballer who plays midfielder for 2. Bundesliga club 1. FC Heidenheim.

== Early life and education ==
Born in Münster, Niehues attended Annette-Gymnasium before spending the final year of his education at Gymnasium Rheindahlen, whilst boarding at Borussia Mönchengladbach.

== Career ==
Niehaus played youth football for Preußen Münster before joining Borussia Mönchengladbach in 2018 on a three-year contract, with Niehues joining their under-18 team for two seasons before being promoted to their reserve team. He made his senior debut for Borussia Mönchengladbach II on 12 September 2020 in a 2–0 win over SV Rödinghausen in the Regionalliga West. He scored 5 goals in 39 appearances across the 2020–21 season, but was released at the end of the season. In June 2021, Niehues signed for 1. FC Kaiserslautern in the 3. Liga.

On 21 March 2024, Niehues signed a three-year contract with Bundesliga club 1. FC Heidenheim, effective in July 2024. On 10 January 2026, he scored his first Bundesliga goal in a 2–2 draw with 1. FC Köln.

== Style of play ==
Niehues plays primarily as a defensive midfielder but can also play as a centre-back.

== Career statistics ==
As of match played 20 September 2026

Appearances and goals by club, season and competition
Club	Season	League			Cup		Europe		Other		Total	
Club	Season	Division	Apps	Goals	Apps	Goals	Apps	Goals	Apps	Goals	Apps	Goals
Borussia Mönchengladbach II	2020–21	Regionalliga West	39	5	—		—		—		39	5
1. FC Kaiserslautern	2021–22	3. Liga	17	1	1	0	—		3 (Note: Two appearances in 2. Bundesliga relegation play-off, one appearance and one goal in Southwestern Cup)	1	21	2
1. FC Kaiserslautern	2022–23	2. Bundesliga	29	2	1	0	—		—		30	2
1. FC Kaiserslautern	2023–24	2. Bundesliga	26	1	3	1	—		—		29	2
1. FC Kaiserslautern	Total		72	4	5	1	—		3	1	80	6
1. FC Heidenheim	2024–25	Bundesliga	8	0	—		2 (Note: Appearances in UEFA Conference League)	0	—		10	0
1. FC Heidenheim	2025–26	Bundesliga	24	3	1	0	—		—		25	3
1. FC Heidenheim	2026–27	2. Bundesliga	4	1	1	0	—		—		5	1
1. FC Heidenheim	Total		36	4	2	0	2	0	—		40	4
Career total			147	13	7	1	2	0	3	1	159	15
