= Richmond Tachie =

German footballer (born 1999)

Personal information
- Date of birth: 21 April 1999 (age 27)
- Place of birth: Berlin, Germany
- Height: 1.80 m (5 ft 11 in)
- Position: Forward

Team information
- Current team: 1. FC Magdeburg
- Number: 29

Youth career
- 2004–2013: Tennis Borussia Berlin
- 2013–2018: VfL Wolfsburg

Senior career*
| Years | Team | Apps | (Gls) |
| 2018–2019 | VfL Wolfsburg II | 22 | (9) |
| 2019–2020 | Viktoria Köln | 4 | (1) |
| 2020–2022 | Borussia Dortmund II | 73 | (17) |
| 2022–2023 | SC Paderborn | 17 | (0) |
| 2023–2026 | 1. FC Kaiserslautern | 48 | (5) |
| 2025 | → Eintracht Braunschweig (loan) | 14 | (2) |
| 2026– | 1. FC Magdeburg | 11 | (1) |
- * Club domestic league appearances and goals as of 18 May 2026

Richmond Tachie (born 21 April 1999) is a German professional footballer who plays as a forward for 2. Bundesliga club 1. FC Magdeburg.

== Club career ==
On 14 April 2022, Tachie signed a two-year contract with SC Paderborn, beginning in the 2022–23 season.

On 7 July 2023, Tachie moved to 1. FC Kaiserslautern.

On 3 February 2025, Tachi joined Eintracht Braunschweig on loan until the end of the season.

On 2 February 2026, Tachi signed with 1. FC Magdeburg.
