= Jan Elvedi =

Swiss footballer (born 1996)

Personal information
- Date of birth: 30 September 1996 (age 30)
- Place of birth: Zürich, Switzerland
- Height: 1.86 m (6 ft 1 in)
- Position: Centre-back

Team information
- Current team: 1. FC Kaiserslautern
- Number: 33

Youth career
- FC Greifensee
- –2011: FC Zürich
- 2011–2014: FC Winterthur

Senior career*
Years	Team	Apps	(Gls)
2014–2016	FC Winterthur II	29	(3)
2014–2017	FC Winterthur	15	(0)
2016–2017	→ SC Cham (loan)	27	(3)
2017–2018	FC Wohlen	23	(2)
2018–2020	SC Kriens	65	(3)
2020–2023	Jahn Regensburg	83	(1)
2023–	1. FC Kaiserslautern	76	(3)
2026	→ Greuther Fürth (loan)	15	(1)
- * Club domestic league appearances and goals as of 18 May 2026

Jan Elvedi (born 30 September 1996) is a Swiss professional footballer who plays as a centre-back for German 2. Bundesliga club Kaiserslautern.

== Career ==
Elvedi made his professional debut for Jahn Regensburg in the 2020–21 DFB-Pokal on 13 September 2020, starting in the home match against 3. Liga side 1. FC Kaiserslautern.

On 30 January 2026, Elvedi moved to Greuther Fürth on loan.

== Personal life ==
Elvedi's twin brother, Nico, is also a professional footballer who plays for Premier League club Leeds United.
