= 2024–25 1. FC Kaiserslautern season =

1. FC Kaiserslautern
2024–25 season
- Manager: Markus Anfang (until 22 April); Torsten Lieberknecht (from 22 April)
- Stadium: Fritz-Walter-Stadion
- 2. Bundesliga: 7th
- DFB-Pokal: Second round
- Top goalscorer: League: Ragnar Ache (16); All: Ragnar Ache (16)
- Average home league attendance: 46,348
| Home colours | Away colours | Third colours |

The 2024–25 season was the 125th season in the history of 1. FC Kaiserslautern and the third consecutive season in the 2. Bundesliga. In addition to the domestic league, the club participated in the DFB-Pokal.

== Summary ==
On 22 June, Kaiserslautern's preparations for the start of 2. Bundesliga began. On the same day, the veteran midfielder Hendrick Zuck also signed an extension to his contract, the duration of which has not been announced.

== Transfers ==
=== In ===
| Pos. | Player | Transferred from | Fee | Date | Source |
|---|---|---|---|---|---|
| FW | (Germany) Angelos Stavridis | (Germany) FC 08 Homburg | Loan return | 30 June 2024 | |
| FW | (Germany) Lex-Tyger Lobinger | (Germany) VfL Osnabrück | Loan return | 30 June 2024 | |
| DF | (Germany) Luca Sirch | (Germany) Lokomotive Leipzig | | 1 July 2024 | |
| DF | (Germany) Jannis Heuer | (Germany) SC Paderborn | | 1 July 2024 | |
| DF | (Germany) Florian Kleinhansl | (Germany) VfL Osnabrück | | 1 July 2024 | |
| MF | (Germany) Erik Wekesser | (Germany) 1. FC Nürnberg | €250,000 | 1 July 2024 | |
| MF | (Czech Republic) Filip Kaloč | (Germany) Baník Ostrava | €435,000 | 1 July 2024 | |
| FW | (Germany) Jannik Mause | (Germany) FC Ingolstadt | €600,000 | 3 July 2024 | |
| DF | (Germany) Jan Gyamerah | (Germany) 1. FC Nürnberg | Loan | 26 July 2024 | |

=== Out ===
| Pos. | Player | Transferred to | Fee | Date | Source |
|---|---|---|---|---|---|
| DF | (Croatia) Nikola Soldo | (Germany) 1. FC Köln | Loan return | 30 June 2024 | |
| DF | (Poland) Tymoteusz Puchacz | (Germany) Union Berlin | Loan return | 30 June 2024 | |
| MF | (Germany) Aaron Basenach | | End of contract | 1 July 2024 | |
| DF | (Germany) Philipp Hercher | (Germany) 1. FC Magdeburg | End of contract | 1 July 2024 | |
| MF | (Germany) Ben Zolinski | | End of contract | 1 July 2024 | |
| MF | (Germany) Julian Niehues | (Germany) 1. FC Heidenheim | End of contract | 1 July 2024 | |
| GK | (Germany) Robin Himmelmann | (Germany) Karlsruher SC | End of contract | 1 July 2024 | |
| DF | (Germany) Kevin Kraus | | End of contract | 1 July 2024 | |

== Friendlies ==
=== Pre-season ===
| 23 June 2024 Friendly | Fanauswahl (Germany) | 0–5 | (Germany) 1. FC Kaiserslautern | Gau-Odernheim |
| 14:30 | | | Kaloč 18'; Abiama 49', 63'; Opoku 55'; Blum 82' | Attendance: 2,000 |

| 28 June 2024 Friendly | TB Jahn Zeiskam (Germany) | 0–8 | (Germany) 1. FC Kaiserslautern | Gau-Odernheim |
| | | | Hanslik 10'; Ronstadt 30'; Klement 50', 89'; Abiama 62'; Redondo 65'; Robbinson 69'; Aremu 73' | Stadium: Gau-Odernheim Kunstrasen |

| 1 July 2024 Friendly | FK Pirmasens (Germany) | 1–2 | (Germany) 1. FC Kaiserslautern | Pirmasens |
| 18:00 | Ehrhart 58' | | Kaloč 43'; Sirch 85' | Stadium: PS - FKP Kunstrasen Husterhöh |

| 8 July 2024 Friendly | Qarabağ (Azerbaijan) | 1–3 | (Germany) 1. FC Kaiserslautern | Imst, Austria |
| 12:30 | Isayev (penalty missed) 44'; Cafarguliyev 70' | | Heuer 23'; Ritter 39'; Tomiak 47' (pen.) | Stadium: Velly Arena Imst |

| 20 July 2024 Friendly | Fortuna Düsseldorf (Germany) | 0–1 | (Germany) 1. FC Kaiserslautern | Offenbach |
| 15:15 | | Report | Klement 4' | Stadium: Stadion am Bieberer Berg |
Note: Two periods of 30 minutes

| 20 July 2024 Friendly | Kickers Offenbach (Germany) | 1–3 | (Germany) 1. FC Kaiserslautern | Offenbach |
| 16:30 | Nazarov 11' | Report | Opoku 17', 53'; Hanslik 44' | Stadium: Stadion am Bieberer Berg |
Note: Two periods of 30 minutes

| 27 July 2024 Friendly | 1. FC Kaiserslautern (Germany) | 2–0 | (Germany) 1860 Munich | Kaiserslautern |
| 13:30 | Ritter 57'; Mause 76' | | | Stadium: Fritz-Walter-Stadion; Attendance: 16,139 |

=== Mid-season ===
| 5 September 2024 Friendly | VfB Stuttgart (Germany) | 4–1 | (Germany) 1. FC Kaiserslautern |
| 15:00 |

| 8 January 2025 Friendly | 1. FC Kaiserslautern (Germany) | 4–0 | (Slovenia) Bravo |
| 16:00 |

== Competitions ==
=== Overall record ===
| Competition | First match | Last match | Starting round | Record | | | | | | | |
| Competition | First match | Last match | Starting round | Pld | W | D | L | GF | GA | GD | Win % |
|---|---|---|---|---|---|---|---|---|---|---|---|
| 2. Bundesliga | 4 August 2024 | 18 May 2025 | Matchday 1 | 34 | 15 | 8 | 11 | 56 | 55 | +1 | 44.12 |
| DFB-Pokal | 17 August 2024 | 29 October 2024 | Second round | 2 | 1 | 0 | 1 | 3 | 3 | +0 | 50.00 |
| Total | | | | 36 | 16 | 8 | 12 | 59 | 58 | +1 | 44.44 |

Last updated: 12 October 2025
Source: Competitions

=== 2. Bundesliga ===
==== League table ====
| Pos | Team | Pld | W | D | L | GF | GA | GD | Pts |
|---|---|---|---|---|---|---|---|---|---|
| 5 | 1. FC Magdeburg | 34 | 14 | 11 | 9 | 64 | 52 | +12 | 53 |
| 6 | Fortuna Düsseldorf | 34 | 14 | 11 | 9 | 57 | 52 | +5 | 53 |
| 7 | 1. FC Kaiserslautern | 34 | 15 | 8 | 11 | 56 | 55 | +1 | 53 |
| 8 | Karlsruher SC | 34 | 14 | 10 | 10 | 57 | 55 | +2 | 52 |
| 9 | Hannover 96 | 34 | 13 | 12 | 9 | 41 | 36 | +5 | 51 |

Source: Bundesliga
Rules for classification: 1) Points; 2) Goal difference; 3) Goals scored; 4) Head-to-head results; 5) Head-to-head away goals scored; 6) Away goals scored; 7) Play-off.
(Rules 4–6 only apply after home and away matches have been played between the tied teams.)

==== Results summary ====
| Overall | | | | | | | | Home | | | | | | Away | | | | | |
| Pld | W | D | L | GF | GA | GD | Pts | W | D | L | GF | GA | GD | W | D | L | GF | GA | GD |
|---|---|---|---|---|---|---|---|---|---|---|---|---|---|---|---|---|---|---|---|
| 34 | 15 | 8 | 11 | 56 | 55 | +1 | 53 | 9 | 5 | 3 | 34 | 22 | +12 | 6 | 3 | 8 | 22 | 33 | −11 |

Last updated: 12 October 2025.
Source: DFB

==== Results by round ====
| Round | 1 | 2 | 3 | 4 | 5 | 6 | 7 | 8 | 9 | 10 | 11 | 12 | 13 | 14 | 15 | 16 | 17 | 18 | 19 | 20 | 21 | 22 | 23 | 24 | 25 | 26 | 27 | 28 | 29 | 30 | 31 | 32 | 33 | 34 |
|---|---|---|---|---|---|---|---|---|---|---|---|---|---|---|---|---|---|---|---|---|---|---|---|---|---|---|---|---|---|---|---|---|---|---|
| Ground | A | H | A | H | A | H | A | A | H | A | H | A | H | A | H | A | H | H | A | H | H | A | A | H | H | A | H | A | H | A | H | A | H | A |
| Result | W | D | W | L | L | D | D | L | W | W | D | D | W | W | W | L | L | W | W | W | W | D | L | W | D | L | W | L | L | L | W | D | W | L |
| Position | 7 | 6 | 5 | 10 | 10 | 10 | 11 | 12 | 11 | 10 | 10 | 10 | 9 | 3 | 2 | 6 | 9 | 5 | 4 | 4 | 3 | 3 | 3 | 2 | 3 | 4 | 3 | 4 | 6 | 7 | 7 | 7 | 6 | 7 |

Updated to match(es) played on 18 May 2025. Source: Bundesliga; positions per Fussballdaten
A = Away; H = Home; W = Win; D = Draw; L = Loss

==== Matches ====
| 4 August 2024 1 | SSV Ulm | 1–2 | 1. FC Kaiserslautern | Ulm |
| 13:30 | Chessa (yellow card) 45'; Higl 48'; Strompf (yellow card) 88' | Report | Heuer (yellow card) 56'; Kaloč (yellow card) 63'; Tomiak 77' (pen.); Opoku 83'; Hanslik (yellow card) 90+2' | Stadium: Donaustadion; Attendance: 17,400; Referee: Robert Schröder |

| 9 August 2024 2 | 1. FC Kaiserslautern | 2–2 | Greuther Fürth | Kaiserslautern |
| 18:30 | Heuer (yellow card) 30'; Hanslik 45+1'; Tomiak (yellow card) 45+3'; Elvedi (yellow card) 79'; Ache 84' | Report | Green 31' (pen.); Futkeu 38'; Srbeny (yellow card) 76' | Stadium: Fritz-Walter-Stadion; Attendance: 41,623; Referee: Florian Lechner |

| 24 August 2024 3 | Preußen Münster | 0–1 | 1. FC Kaiserslautern | Münster |
| 13:00 | Bazzoli (yellow card) 29'; Lorenz (yellow card) 33'; Amenyido (yellow card) 68'; Koulis (yellow card) 90+4' | Report | Hanslik (yellow card) 8'; Wekesser (yellow card) 34'; Gyamerah (yellow card) 56'; Anfang (yellow card) 80'; Ache 85'; Ritter (yellow card) 89' | Stadium: Preußenstadion; Attendance: 12,422; Referee: Michael Bacher |

| 31 August 2024 4 | 1. FC Kaiserslautern | 3–4 | Hertha BSC | Kaiserslautern |
| 20:30 | Klement 32'; Opoku 45'; Tomiak 68'; Elvedi (yellow card) 81' | Report | Schuler 28', 64'; Scherhant 51'; Cuisance 79'; Klemens (yellow card) 90+4' | Stadium: Fritz-Walter-Stadion; Attendance: 48,608; Referee: Benjamin Brand |

| 14 September 2024 5 | Hannover 96 | 3–1 | 1. FC Kaiserslautern | Hanover |
| 13:00 | Lee Hyun-ju 6' (yellow card) 69'; Leitl (yellow card) 54'; Neumann (yellow card) 59'; Ngankam (yellow card) 63'; Christiansen 73'; Wdowik (yellow card) 83'; Momuluh 90+5' | Report | Wekesser (yellow card) 12'; Ache 56'; Touré (yellow card) 65'; Tomiak (yellow card) 85' | Stadium: Heinz-von-Heiden-Arena; Attendance: 38,100; Referee: Robert Kampka |

| 21 September 2024 6 | 1. FC Kaiserslautern | 2–2 | Hamburger SV | Kaiserslautern |
| 20:30 | Ache 32'; Wekesser (yellow card) 38'; Tachie 50'; Kaloč (yellow card) 78' | Report | Hadzikadunic (yellow card) 29'; Hefti (yellow card) 45+3'; Glatzel 58'; Selke (yellow card) 62' (goal) 90+5' | Stadium: Fritz-Walter-Stadion; Attendance: 49,327; Referee: Florian Exner |

| 28 September 2024 7 | SSV Jahn Regensburg | 0–0 | 1. FC Kaiserslautern | Regensburg |
| 13:00 | Hein (yellow card) 9'; Pröger (yellow card) 90+1' | [https://www.fotmob.com/matches/jahn-regensburg-vs-kaiserslautern/25jpls#4534888 | Tachie (yellow card) 12'; Abiama (yellow card) 53'; Ritter (yellow card) 62'; Mause (yellow card) 90+1' | Stadium: Jahnstadion Regensburg; Attendance: 14,431; Referee: Max Burda |

| 5 October 2024 8 | SV Elversberg | 1–0 | 1. FC Kaiserslautern | Elversberg |
| 13:00 | Sahin (yellow card) 14'; Rohr (yellow card) 22'; Damar 66'; Schmahl (yellow card) 81' | Report | Hanslik (yellow card) 45+2'; Kaloč (yellow card) 67' | Stadium: URSAPHARM-Arena an der Kaiserlinde; Attendance: 9,502; Referee: Lars Erbst |

| 19 October 2024 9 | 1. FC Kaiserslautern | 3–0 | SC Paderborn | Kaiserslautern |
| 20:30 | Aremu (yellow card) 25'; Ache 30'; Kaloč (yellow card) 36'; Sirch 87'; Ritter 90'; Raschl (yellow card) 90+4' | Report | Curda (yellow card) 38' (yellow-red card) 90+4'; Herrmann (yellow card) 76' | Stadium: Fritz-Walter-Stadion; Attendance: 42,028; Referee: Richard Hempel |

| 26 October 2024 10 | Fortuna Düsseldorf | 3–4 | 1. FC Kaiserslautern | Düsseldorf |
| 20:30 | Jóhannesson 35' (pen.); van Brederode 49'; Klaus (yellow card) 76' (goal) 90+4'; Appelkamp (yellow card) 85' | Report | Hanslik 14' 67'; Krahl (yellow card) 35'; Elvedi (yellow card) 49'; Tomiak (yellow card) 52'; Yokota 58'; Ache 61' | Stadium: Merkur Spiel-Arena; Attendance: 44,557; Referee: Frank Willenborg |

| 3 November 2024 11 | 1. FC Kaiserslautern | 2–2 | 1. FC Magdeburg | Kaiserslautern |
| 13:30 | Tomiak 32' (yellow card) 51'; Ache 68'; Elvedi (yellow card) 90' | Report | Loric 11'; Hercher 13'; Michel (yellow card) 30' (yellow-red card) 36'; Mathisen (yellow card) 36'; Kaars (yellow card) 52' (yellow-red card) 90+3' | Stadium: Fritz-Walter-Stadion; Attendance: 45,104; Referee: Florian Badstübner |

| 8 November 2024 12 | 1. FC Nürnberg | 0–0 | 1. FC Kaiserslautern | Nürnberg |
| 18:30 | Jeltsch (yellow card) 47' | [https://www.fotmob.com/matches/1-fc-nurnberg-vs-kaiserslautern/297alg#4534951 | Tomiak (yellow card) 28'; Aremu (yellow card) 37'; Ache (yellow card) 86' | Stadium: Max-Morlock-Stadion; Attendance: 37,731; Referee: Matthias Jöllenbeck |

| 24 November 2024 13 | 1. FC Kaiserslautern | 3–2 | Eintracht Braunschweig | Kaiserslautern |
| 13:30 | Kaloč 17'; Ache 41'; Hanslik 45+2'; Ronstadt (yellow card) 52' | Report | Philippe 45' (pen.), 90+6'; Kaufmann (yellow card) 46'; Nicolaou (yellow card) 53'; Bell Bell (yellow card) 61'; Ivanov (yellow card) 82' | Stadium: Fritz-Walter-Stadion; Attendance: 45,615; Referee: Max Burda |

| 29 November 2024 14 | FC Schalke 04 | 0–3 | 1. FC Kaiserslautern | Gelsenkirchen |
| 18:30 | Bulut (yellow card) 59' | Report | Ache 12'; Aremu (yellow card) 17'; Hanslik 52'; Kaloč (yellow card) 58'; Yokota 61'; Redondo (yellow card) 79'; Kleinhansl (yellow card) 89' | Stadium: VELTINS-Arena; Attendance: 62,075; Referee: Robin Braun |

| 7 December 2024 15 | 1. FC Kaiserslautern | 3–1 | Karlsruher SC | Kaiserslautern |
| 13:00 | Hartmann 13' (pen.); Jan Elvedi (yellow card) 40'; Yokota (yellow card) 45+3'; Anfang (yellow card) 45+4'; Ronstadt (yellow card) 56'; Redondo 73'; Heuer 75'; Kleinhansl (yellow card) 82'; Tomiak (yellow card) 87' | Report | Franke (yellow card) 45+3'; Wanitzek 88' | Stadium: Fritz-Walter-Stadion; Attendance: 48,567; Referee: Robert Hartmann |

| 14 December 2024 16 | SV Darmstadt | 5–1 | 1. FC Kaiserslautern | Darmstadt |
| 20:30 | Lopez (yellow card) 22'; Corredor 33', 88'; Hornby 45+2', 73'; Marseiler 62' | Report | Ritter (yellow card) 63'; Tomiak (yellow card) 73'; Hanslik 84' | Stadium: Merck-Stadion am Böllenfalltor; Attendance: 17,810; Referee: Florian Lechner |

| 22 December 2024 17 | 1. FC Kaiserslautern | 0–1 | 1. FC Köln | Kaiserslautern |
| 13:30 | Jan Gyamerah (yellow card) 56'; Heuer (yellow card) 67' | Report | Ljubičić 33' (yellow card) 40'; Schwäbe (yellow card) 81'; Maina (yellow card) 90+4' | Stadium: Fritz-Walter-Stadion; Attendance: 49,327; Referee: Wolfgang Haslberger |

| 18 January 2025 18 | 1. FC Kaiserslautern | 2–1 | SSV Ulm | Kaiserslautern |
| 13:00 | Ritter 23'; Kaloč 37'; Robinson (yellow card) 47'; Wekesser (yellow card) 90+1' | Report | Strompf 4'; Ludwig (yellow card) 28'; Kolbe (yellow card) 36'; Krattenmacher (yellow card) 56' | Stadium: Fritz-Walter-Stadion; Attendance: 42,367; Referee: Michael Bacher |

| 24 January 2025 19 | Greuther Fürth | 2–4 | 1. FC Kaiserslautern | Fürth |
| 18:30 | Müller 6', 84' (yellow card) 84' (red card); Giesselmann (yellow card) 45+3'; Hrgota 67' | Report | Ritter 28'; Yokota 52'; Hanslik (yellow card) 60'; Kaloč 73'; Gyamerah (yellow card) 80' (yellow-red card) 86'; Aremu (yellow card) 90+1'; Ache 90+3' | Stadium: Sportpark Ronhof Thomas Sommer; Attendance: 13,590; Referee: Felix Prigan |

| 2 February 2025 20 | 1. FC Kaiserslautern | 2–1 | SC Preußen Münster | Kaiserslautern |
| 13:30 | Ritter 51' (yellow card) 56'; Sirch 90+2' | Report | Scherder (yellow card) 14'; Frenkert (yellow card) 40'; Kinsombi (yellow card) 53' (goal) 79'; Lorenz (yellow card) 84'; Makridis (yellow card) 85'; Behrens (yellow card) 90+1' | Stadium: Fritz-Walter-Stadion; Attendance: 42,367; Referee: Patrick Schwengers |

| 8 February 2025 21 | Hertha BSC | 0–1 | 1. FC Kaiserslautern | Berlin |
| 20:30 | | Report | Yokota (yellow card) 49'; Sirch 57'; Bauer (yellow card) 73' | Stadium: Olympiastadion (Berlin); Attendance: 47,443; Referee: Martin Petersen |

| 15 February 2025 22 | 1. FC Kaiserslautern | 0–0 | Hannover 96 | Kaiserslautern |
| 13:00 | Yokota (yellow card) 30'; Alidou (yellow card) 86' | Report | Kunze (yellow card) 65'; Tomiak (yellow card) 88' | Stadium: Fritz-Walter-Stadion; Attendance: 45,779; Referee: Robert Kampka |

| 21 February 2025 23 | Hamburger SV | 3–0 | 1. FC Kaiserslautern | Hamburg |
| 18:30 | Selke 42', 65'; Mebude (yellow card) 58'; Balde 78' | Report | Redondo (yellow card) 90+3' | Stadium: Volksparkstadion; Attendance: 57,000; Referee: Sören Storks |

| 1 March 2025 24 | 1. FC Kaiserslautern | 3–0 | SSV Jahn Regensburg | Kaiserslautern |
| 13:00 | Elvedi (yellow card) 41'; Ache 47', 70'; Ritter 51' | Report | Adamyan (yellow card) 2'; Hein (yellow card) 26'; Suhonen (yellow card) 54'; Kühlwetter (yellow card) 78' | Stadium: Fritz-Walter-Stadion; Attendance: 41,579; Referee: Robin Braun |

| 7 March 2025 25 | 1. FC Kaiserslautern | 1–1 | SV Elversberg | Kaiserslautern |
| 18:30 | Ache 41'; Bauer (yellow card) 54'; Ritter (yellow card) 58'; Kaloč (yellow card) 58'; Alidou (yellow card) 89' | Report | Lukas Pinckert (yellow card) 29'; Fellhauer (yellow card) 36'; Damar 75' | Stadium: Fritz-Walter-Stadion; Attendance: 49,068; Referee: Florian Lechner |

| 15 March 2025 26 | SC Paderborn 07 | 5–3 | 1. FC Kaiserslautern | Paderborn |
| 13:00 | Zehnter 2', 90+5'; Obermair 8' (pen.); Bilbija 15'; Ansah (yellow card) 36'; Laurin Curda (yellow card) 50'; Grimaldi 73' (yellow card) 84' | Report | Hanslik 45+1' (pen.); Ache 45+8', 61'; Tim Breithaupt (yellow card) 55'; Krahl (yellow card) 90+5' | Stadium: Benteler-Arena; Attendance: 15,000; Referee: Wolfgang Haslberger |

| 29 March 2025 27 | 1. FC Kaiserslautern | 3–1 | Fortuna Düsseldorf | Kaiserslautern |
| 20:30 | Ritter 14' (yellow card) 38'; Hanslik (yellow card) 67'; Ache 73'; Sirch 90+3' | Report | Johannesson (yellow card) 15'; Zimmermann (yellow card) 19'; Oberdorf (yellow card) 35' (goal) 60'; Niemiec (yellow card) 84'; Siebert (yellow card) 90' | Stadium: Fritz-Walter-Stadion; Attendance: 48,279; Referee: Max Burda |

| 6 April 2025 28 | 1. FC Magdeburg | 2–0 | 1. FC Kaiserslautern | Magdeburg |
| 13:30 | Atik 29', 43'; Burcu (yellow card) 45+1'; Reimann (yellow card) 54'; Amaechi (yellow card) 90+4' | Report | Redondo (yellow card) 75' | Stadium: MDCC-Arena; Attendance: 27,100; Referee: Michael Bacher |

| 12 April 2025 29 | 1. FC Kaiserslautern | 1–2 | 1. FC Nürnberg | Kaiserslautern |
| 20:30 | Ritter 72' (pen.); Kaloč (yellow card) 90+3'; Bauer (yellow card) 90+6' | Report | Gruber 14'; Castrop (yellow card) 54'; Emreli 68' (yellow card) 70'; Schleimer (yellow card) 83'; Reichert (yellow card) 87'; Serra (yellow card) 90+7' | Stadium: Fritz-Walter-Stadion; Attendance: 49,327; Referee: Robert Schröder |

| 19 April 2025 30 | Eintracht Braunschweig | 2–0 | 1. FC Kaiserslautern | Braunschweig |
| 13:00 | Marie (yellow card) 12'; Tempelmann (yellow card) 28' (goal) 51'; Bell Bell (yellow card) 31'; Philippe 53'; Köhler (yellow card) 60'; Jaeckel (yellow card) 62' | Report | Breithaupt (yellow card) 23'; Redondo (yellow card) 45+1'; Bauer (yellow card) 76' | Stadium: Eintracht-Stadion; Attendance: 22,651; Referee: Richard Hempel |

| 27 April 2025 31 | 1. FC Kaiserslautern | 2–1 | FC Schalke 04 | Kaiserslautern |
| 13:30 | Yokota 35'; Ronstadt (yellow card) 55'; Ache 77' | Report | Sylla 62'; Murkin (yellow card) 81' | Stadium: Fritz-Walter-Stadion; Attendance: 49,327; Referee: Daniel Schlager |

| 4 May 2025 32 | Karlsruher SC | 1–1 | 1. FC Kaiserslautern | Karlsruhe |
| 13:30 | Farhat 10'; Jung 58'; Jensen (yellow card) 89' | Report | Elvedi 31'; Hanslik 64'; Raschl (yellow card) 73' | Stadium: Wildparkstadion; Attendance: 32,190; Referee: Tobias Stieler |

| 11 May 2025 33 | 1. FC Kaiserslautern | 2–1 | SV Darmstadt 98 | Kaiserslautern |
| 15:30 | Ritter 15' (yellow card) 45+3'; Ache 45+7'; Redondo (yellow card) 88' | Report | Marseiler 3'; Schuhen (yellow card) 45+7'; Riedel (yellow card) 47'; Maglica (yellow card) 62' | Stadium: Fritz-Walter-Stadion; Attendance: 49,088; Referee: Robin Braun |

| 18 May 2025 34 | 1. FC Köln | 4–0 | 1. FC Kaiserslautern | Cologne |
| 15:30 | Martel 14'; Waldschmidt 29'; Kainz 76' | Report | Ritter (yellow card) 45+7'; Ronstadt (yellow card) 70' | Stadium: RheinEnergieStadion; Attendance: 50,000; Referee: Sören Storks |

=== DFB Pokal ===
| 17 August 2024 First round | FC Ingolstadt | 1–2 | 1. FC Kaiserslautern | Ingolstadt |
| 15:30 | | | | Stadium: Audi Sportpark |

| 29 October 2024 Second round | VfB Stuttgart | 2–1 | 1. FC Kaiserslautern | Stuttgart |
| 20:45 CET (UTC+1) | Woltemade 14'; Führich (yellow card) 35', (goal) 76'; Millot (yellow card) 90+4' | Report | Tomiak 43' (pen.); Ritter (yellow card) 62'; Raschl (yellow card) 80'; Wekesser (yellow card) 86'; Hanslik (yellow card) 90+3' | Stadium: MHPArena; Attendance: 60,000; Referee: Daniel Schlager |
