= 2023–24 Hertha BSC season =

Hertha BSC
2023–24 season
- Head coach: Pál Dárdai
- Stadium: Olympiastadion
- 2. Bundesliga: 9th
- DFB-Pokal: Quarter-finals
- Top goalscorer: League: Haris Tabaković (22); All: Haris Tabaković (25)
- Highest home attendance: 66,113 vs FC St. Pauli
- Lowest home attendance: 35,291 vs Wehen Wiesbaden
- Average home league attendance: 50,559
- Biggest win: Hertha BSC 5–0 Greuther Fürth
- Biggest defeat: Hamburger SV 3–0 Hertha BSC

The 2023–24 season was Hertha BSC's 132nd season in existence and first one back in the 2. Bundesliga. They also competed in the DFB-Pokal.

== Players ==
=== First-team squad ===
As of 1 September 2023

Note: Flags indicate national team as defined under FIFA eligibility rules; some limited exceptions apply. Players may hold more than one non-FIFA nationality.

No.	Pos.	Nation	Player
2	DF	SVK	Peter Pekarík
3	DF	URU	Agustín Rogel
5	MF	GRE	Andreas Bouchalakis
6	DF	POL	Michał Karbownik
7	FW	GER	Florian Niederlechner
8	MF	SWE	Bilal Hussein
9	FW	BIH	Smail Prevljak
11	MF	GER	Fabian Reese
12	GK	GER	Tjark Ernst
15	FW	COM	Myziane Maolida
16	DF	ENG	Jonjoe Kenny
17	FW	GER	Nader El-Jindaoui
19	MF	TUN	Jeremy Dudziak
20	DF	GER	Marc-Oliver Kempf
21	DF	ANG	Anderson Lucoqui

No.	Pos.	Nation	Player
22	MF	GER	Marten Winkler
24	MF	GER	Bence Dárdai
25	FW	BIH	Haris Tabaković
26	FW	DEN	Gustav Christensen
27	FW	HUN	Palkó Dárdai
28	FW	FRA	Kélian Nsona
30	MF	GER	Ibrahim Maza
31	DF	HUN	Márton Dárdai
34	DF	NED	Deyovaisio Zeefuik
35	GK	GER	Marius Gersbeck
37	DF	GER	Toni Leistner (captain)
39	FW	GER	Derry Scherhant
40	FW	GER	Luca Wollschläger
41	DF	GER	Pascal Klemens
44	DF	GER	Linus Gechter

=== Players out on loan ===
Note: Flags indicate national team as defined under FIFA eligibility rules; some limited exceptions apply. Players may hold more than one non-FIFA nationality.

No.	Pos.	Nation	Player
—	DF	GER	Julian Eitschberger (at Hallescher FC until 30 June 2024)
—	MF	GER	Suat Serdar (at Hellas Verona until 30 June 2024)

No.	Pos.	Nation	Player
—	FW	CIV	Wilfried Kanga (at Standard Liège until 30 June 2024)

== Transfers ==
=== In ===
Pos.	Player	Transferred from	Fee	Date	Source
MF	(Germany) Fabian Reese	(Germany) Holstein Kiel	Free	1 July 2023	
GK	(Germany) Marius Gersbeck	(Germany) Karlsruher SC	€300,000	1 July 2023	
FW	(Bosnia and Herzegovina) Smail Prevljak	(Belgium) K.A.S. Eupen	Free	1 July 2023	
DF	(Poland) Michał Karbownik	(England) Brighton & Hove Albion	Undisclosed	8 August 2023	

=== Out ===
Pos.	Player	Transferred from	Fee	Date	Source
FW	(Belgium) Dodi Lukebakio	(Spain) Sevilla FC	€10,000,000	23 August 2023	

== Pre-season and friendlies ==
Win Draw Loss

2 July 2023 Friendly	RSV Eintracht 1949 (Germany)	0–6	(Germany) Hertha BSC
16:00 CEST (UTC+2)			Winkler 15', 43'; Richter 17'; Niederlechner 30'; Kempf 38'; Scherhant 58'

7 July 2023 Friendly	Hertha BSC (Germany)	2–0	(Germany) BFC Dynamo
19:00 CEST (UTC+2)	Winkler 54'; Scherhant 56'

8 July 2023 Friendly	Young Boys (Switzerland)	4–2	(Germany) Hertha BSC	Biel/Bienne, Switzerland
16:00 CEST (UTC+2)	Łakomy 5', 50'; Joël Monteiro 28'; Dema 87'		Dárdai 71'; Kanga 81' (pen.)	Stadium: Tissot Arena

15 July 2023 Friendly	RWD Molenbeek (Belgium)	1–2	(Germany) Hertha BSC	Leogang, Austria
16:00 CEST (UTC+2)	Dailly 14'	Report	Reese 10'; Richter 28'	Stadium: Steinbergstadion; Referee: Arnes Talic

16 July 2023 Friendly	Antwerp (Belgium)	1–0	(Germany) Hertha BSC	Saalfelden, Austria
	Balikwisha 52'			Stadium: 1508 Saalfelden Arena; Attendance: 0

21 July 2023 Friendly	Standard Liège (Belgium)	1–1	(Germany) Hertha BSC	Liège, Belgium
18:00 CEST (UTC+2)	Drăguș 85'		Kempf 58'	Stadium: Complexe Standard de Liège

8 September 2023 Friendly	Hertha Zehlendorf (Germany)	1–4	(Germany) Hertha BSC	Berlin
18:30 CEST (UTC+2)				Stadium: Ernst-Reuter-Sportfeld

12 October 2023 Friendly	Tennis Borussia Berlin (Germany)	1–6	(Germany) Hertha BSC	Berlin
19:00 CEST (UTC+2)				Stadium: Mommsenstadion

16 November 2023 Friendly	Hertha BSC (Germany)	4–0	(Germany) VSG Altglienicke	Berlin
13:00 CET (UTC+1)	Niederlechner 13', 61'; Winkler 46'; Scherhant 70' (pen.)			Stadium: Olympiapark Hanns Braun

6 January 2024 Friendly	Hertha BSC (Germany)	2–0	(Germany) Erzgebirge Aue	Berlin
14:00 CET (UTC+1)	Niederlechner 71', 83'			Stadium: Stadion auf dem Wurfplatz

10 January 2024 Friendly	Hertha BSC (Germany)	0–3	(Belgium) Mechelen	San Pedro del Pinatar, Spain
15:00 CET (UTC+1)	Zeefuik (red card) 76'	Report	Pflücke 23', 29'; Asante 90+1'	Stadium: Pinatar Arena Football Center

13 January 2024 Friendly	Hertha BSC (Germany)	1–0	(Scotland) Rangers	La Manga, Spain
16:00 CET (UTC+1)	Kempf 45'	Report		Stadium: La Manga Club Football Centre A

== Competitions ==
=== Overall record ===
Competition	First match	Last match	Starting round	Final position	Record							
Competition	First match	Last match	Starting round	Final position	Pld	W	D	L	GF	GA	GD	Win %
2. Bundesliga	28 July 2023	19 May 2024	Matchday 1	9th	34	13	9	12	69	59	+10	38.24
DFB-Pokal	12 August 2023	31 January 2024	First round	Quarter-finals	4	2	1	1	12	6	+6	50.00
Total					38	15	10	13	81	65	+16	39.47

Source: Soccerway

=== 2. Bundesliga ===
==== League table ====
Pos	Team	Pld	W	D	L	GF	GA	GD	Pts
7	SC Paderborn	34	15	7	12	54	54	0	52
8	Greuther Fürth	34	14	8	12	50	49	+1	50
9	Hertha BSC	34	13	9	12	69	59	+10	48
10	Schalke 04	34	12	7	15	53	60	−7	43
11	SV Elversberg	34	12	7	15	49	63	−14	43

Source: DFB
Rules for classification: 1) Points; 2) Goal difference; 3) Goals scored; 4) Head-to-head results; 5) Head-to-head away goals scored; 6) Away goals scored; 7) Play-off.
(Rules 4–6 only apply after home and away matches have been played between the tied teams.)

==== Results summary ====
Overall								Home						Away					
Pld	W	D	L	GF	GA	GD	Pts	W	D	L	GF	GA	GD	W	D	L	GF	GA	GD
34	13	9	12	69	59	+10	48	8	6	3	43	22	+21	5	3	9	26	37	−11

Last updated: 27 January 2024.
Source: DFB

==== Results by round ====
Round	1	2	3	4	5	6	7	8	9	10	11	12	13	14	15	16	17	18	19	20	21	22	23	24	25	26	27	28	29	30	31	32	33	34
Ground	A	H	A	H	A	H	A	H	A	A	H	A	H	A	H	A	H	H	A	H	A	H	A	H	A	H	H	A	H	A	H	A	H	A
Result	L	L	L	W	L	W	W	L	W	L	W	D	D	D	W	W	D	D	L	L	W	W	D	D	L	W	D	W	W	L	D	L	W	L
Position	14	17	18	14	17	15	9	12	9	11	9	12	12	7	8	7	7	7	10	11	8	8	8	9	11	9	9	7	6	7	8	9	8	9

Updated to match(es) played on 27 January 2024. Source: DFB
A = Away; H = Home; W = Win; D = Draw; L = Loss

==== Matches ====
The league fixtures were unveiled on 30 June 2023.

29 July 2023 1	Fortuna Düsseldorf	1–0	Hertha BSC	Düsseldorf
20:30 UTC+2	Ginczek 51'	Report		Stadium: Merkur Spiel-Arena; Attendance: 40,466; Referee: Christian Dingert

4 August 2023 2	Hertha BSC	0–1	SV Wehen Wiesbaden	Berlin
18:30 UTC+2		Report	Günther 90+2'	Stadium: Olympiastadion; Attendance: 40,075; Referee: Florian Lechner

19 August 2023 3	Hamburger SV	3–0	Hertha BSC	Hamburg
20:30 UTC+2	Jatta 38'; Bénes 45+4' (pen.); Glatzel 82'	Report		Stadium: Volksparkstadion; Attendance: 57,000; Referee: Frank Willenborg

26 August 2023 4	Hertha BSC	5–0	Greuther Fürth	Berlin
13:00 UTC+2	Tabaković 23', 77'; Winkler 31'; Dárdai 46'; Prevljak 66'	Report		Stadium: Olympiastadion; Attendance: 35,291; Referee: Tobias Stieler

2 September 2023 5	1. FC Magdeburg	6–4	Hertha BSC	Magdeburg
13:00 UTC+2	Gnaka 7'; Schuler 37'; Ceka 49'; Bell Bell 58'; El Hankouri 68'; Arslan 90+4'	Report	Reese 2'; Winkler 22'; Tabaković 42', 55'	Stadium: MDCC-Arena; Attendance: 26,872; Referee: Tom Bauer

17 September 2023 6	Hertha BSC	3–0	Eintracht Braunschweig	Berlin
13:30 UTC+2	Tabaković 38', 45+2' (pen.), 71'	Report		Stadium: Olympiastadion; Attendance: 43,528; Referee: Marco Fritz

24 September 2023 7	Holstein Kiel	2–3	Hertha BSC	Kiel
13:30 UTC+2	Pichler 54'; Skrzybski 57' (pen.)	Report	Prevljak 27'; Bouchalakis 39'; Reese 90+2' (pen.)	Stadium: Holstein-Stadion; Attendance: 15,034; Referee: Florian Badstübner

30 September 2023 8	Hertha BSC	1–2	FC St. Pauli	Berlin
20:30 UTC+2	Scherhant 83'	Report	Eggestein 25'; Hartel 74'	Stadium: Olympiastadion; Attendance: 66,113; Referee: Deniz Aytekin

8 October 2023 9	Schalke 04	1–2	Hertha BSC	Gelsenkirchen
13:30 UTC+2	Kabadayı 80'	Report	Prevljak 41'; Reese 52'	Stadium: Veltins-Arena; Attendance: 61,887; Referee: Harm Osmers

22 October 2023 10	1. FC Nürnberg	3–1	Hertha BSC	Nürnberg
13:30 UTC+2	Castrop 57'; Leistner 72' (o.g.); Hayashi 84'	Report	Prevljak 15'	Stadium: Max-Morlock-Stadion; Attendance: 37,320; Referee: Florian Exner

28 October 2023 11	Hertha BSC	3–1	SC Paderborn 07	Berlin
13:00 UTC+2	Tabaković 11', 55'; Kenny 45+3'	Report	Muslija 47'	Stadium: Olympiastadion; Attendance: 35,832; Referee: Tom Bauer

5 November 2023 12	Hansa Rostock	0–0	Hertha BSC	Rostock
13:30 UTC+1		Report		Stadium: Ostseestadion; Attendance: 26,000; Referee: Martin Petersen

11 November 2023 13	Hertha BSC	2–2	Karlsruher SC	Berlin
20:30 UTC+1	Reese 29'; Niederlechner 42'	Report	Zeefuik 10' (o.g.); Jensen 81'	Stadium: Olympiastadion; Attendance: 58,851; Referee: Michael Bacher

24 November 2023 14	Hannover 96	2–2	Hertha BSC	Hanover
18:30	Zeefuik 10' (o.g.); Jensen 81'	Report	Niederlechner 29'; Klemens 45'	Stadium: Heinz-von-Heiden-Arena; Attendance: 45,100; Referee: Timo Gerach

3 December 2023 15	Hertha BSC	5–1	SV Elversberg	Berlin
13:30	Gechter 12'; Niederlechner 23', 61', 67'; Kenny 71'	Report	Jacobsen 15'	Stadium: Olympiastadion; Attendance: 33,097; Referee: Sven Jablonski

9 December 2023 16	1. FC Kaiserslautern	1–2	Hertha BSC	Kaiserslautern
13:00	Touré 16'	Report	Niederlechner 49'; Kempf 81'	Stadium: Fritz-Walter-Stadion; Attendance: 45,308; Referee: Harm Osmers

16 December 2023 17	Hertha BSC	0–0	VfL Osnabrück	Berlin
13:00		Report		Stadium: Olympiastadion; Attendance: 43,650; Referee: Patrick Ittrich

21 January 2024 18	Hertha BSC	2–2	Fortuna Düsseldorf	Berlin
13:30	Tabaković 30'; Zeefuik (yellow card) 34'; Scherhant 45+1'; Bouchalakis (yellow card) 45+4'; Kempf (yellow card) 49'; Leistner (yellow card) 65'; Pascal Klemens (yellow card) 80'; Barkok (yellow card) 89'	Report	Bergmann Jóhannesson 44'; Tzolis 50' (pen.); Engelhardt (yellow card) 57'	Stadium: Olympiastadion; Attendance: 42,902; Referee: (Germany) Robert Kampka

27 January 2024 19	Wehen Wiesbaden	3–1	Hertha BSC	Wiesbaden
13:00 CET	Kovačević 24' 53'; Goppel 72'	Report	Kenny 59'; Leistner (yellow card) 76'; Tabaković (yellow card) 83'	Stadium: Brita-Arena; Attendance: 10,454; Referee: (Germany) Wolfgang Haslberger

3 February 2024 20	Hertha BSC	1–2	Hamburger SV	Berlin
20:30 CET	Tabaković 82'	Report	Muheim 77'; Reis 90+13'	Stadium: Olympiastadion; Attendance: 58,013; Referee: Daniel Schlager

11 February 2024 21	Greuther Fürth	1–2	Hertha BSC	Fürth
13:30 CET	Hrgota 56'	Report	Kempf 34', 63'	Stadium: Sportpark Ronhof Thomas Sommer; Attendance: 13,459; Referee: Marco Fritz

16 February 2024 22	Hertha BSC	3–2	1. FC Magdeburg	Berlin
18:30 CET	Reese 33' (pen.), 59'; Dárdai 39'	Report	Atik 22'; Müller 51'	Stadium: Olympiastadion; Attendance: 52,652; Referee: Florian Exner

24 February 2024 23	Eintracht Braunschweig	1–1	Hertha BSC	Braunschweig
13:00 CET	Kaufmann 14'	Report	Maza 52'	Stadium: Eintracht-Stadion; Attendance: 22,636; Referee: Patrick Alt

1 March 2024 24	Hertha BSC	2–2	Holstein Kiel	Berlin
18:30 CET	Tabaković 10', 45'	Report	Porath 81'; Becker 90+8' (pen.)	Stadium: Olympiastadion; Attendance: 46,835; Referee: Bastian Dankert

10 March 2024 25	FC St. Pauli	2–0	Hertha BSC	Hamburg
13:30 CET	Saliakas 16'; Hartel 44'	Report		Stadium: Millerntor-Stadion; Attendance: 29,546; Referee: Harm Osmers

17 March 2024 26	Hertha BSC	5–2	Schalke 04	Berlin
13:30 CET	Tabaković 2', 13'; Winkler 39', 56'; Niederlechner 75'	Report	Terodde 5', 27'	Stadium: Olympiastadion; Attendance: 69,156; Referee: Sven Jablonski

30 March 2024 27	Hertha BSC	3–3	1. FC Nürnberg	Berlin
20:30 UTC+1	Winkler 44'; Tabaković 54', 56' (pen.)	Report	Uzun 14', 47'; Schleimer 33'	Stadium: Olympiastadion; Attendance: 45,000; Referee: Alexander Sather

5 April 2024 28	SC Paderborn 07	2–3	Hertha BSC	Paderborn
18:30 UTC+2	Obermair 16'; Musliu 60'	Report	Barkok 17'; Hussein 84'; Tabaković 90'	Stadium: Home Deluxe Arena; Attendance: 15,000; Referee: Martin Petersen

12 April 2024 29	Hertha BSC	4–0	FC Hansa Rostock	Berlin
18:30 UTC+2	Dárdai 18', 59'; Reese 31' (pen.); Tabaković 86'	Report		Stadium: Olympiastadion; Attendance: 62,177; Referee: Robin Braun

21 April 2024 30	Karlsruher SC	3–2	Hertha BSC	Karlsruhe
13:30 UTC+2	Thiede 16'; Matanović 45'; Wanitzek 77'	Report	Tabaković 23', 87' (pen.)	Stadium: Wildparkstadion; Attendance: 33,000; Referee: Bastian Dankert

26 April 2024 31	Hertha BSC	1–1	Hannover 96	Berlin
18:30 UTC+2	Kempf 13'	Report	Leopold 90+3'	Stadium: Olympiastadion; Attendance: 59,192; Referee: Timo Gerach

5 May 2024 32	SV Elversberg	4–2	Hertha BSC	Spiesen-Elversberg
13:30 UTC+2	Schnellbacher 18', 54'; Wanner 65'; Koffi 88'	Report	Reese 27'; Dárdai 62'	Stadium: Waldstadion an der Kaiserlinde; Attendance: 9,502; Referee: Florian Lechner

11 May 2024 33	Hertha BSC	3–1	1. FC Kaiserslautern	Berlin
13:00 UTC+2	Tabaković 19' (pen.); Dudziak 45+3'; Reese 67'	Report	Ritter 39'	Stadium: Olympiastadion; Attendance: 67,144; Referee: Daniel Schlager

19 May 2024 34	VfL Osnabrück	2–1	Hertha BSC	Osnabrück
15:30 UTC+2	Wiemann 44'; Wriedt 76'	Report	Dárdai 5'	Stadium: Stadion an der Bremer Brücke; Attendance: 15,741; Referee: Patrick Alt

=== DFB-Pokal ===
12 August 2023 First round	Carl Zeiss Jena	0–5	Hertha BSC	Jena
13:00 CEST (UTC+2)		Report	Dárdai 6'; Tabaković 47'; Richter 49', 52'; Uremović 59'	Stadium: Ernst-Abbe-Sportfeld; Attendance: 13,000; Referee: Florian Heft

1 November 2023 Second round	Hertha BSC	3–0	Mainz 05	Berlin
20:45 CET (UTC+1)	Reese 45+3' (pen.); Tabaković 50' (pen.), 61'; Zeefuik (yellow card) 78'	Report	Ajorque (yellow card) 90+3'	Stadium: Olympiastadion; Attendance: 29,621; Referee: Matthias Jöllenbeck

6 December 2023 Round of 16	Hertha BSC	3–3 (a.e.t.) (5–3 p)	Hamburger SV	Berlin
20:45 UTC+1	Reese 21', 90'; Kenny 120'	Report	Pherai 31'; Bénes 43'; Königsdörffer 102'	Stadium: Olympiastadion; Attendance: 58,946; Referee: Sascha Stegemann
	Penalties
	Prevljak (penalty scored); Klemens (penalty scored); El-Jindaoui (penalty scored); Kenny (penalty scored); Reese (penalty scored)		(penalty scored) Bénes; (penalty scored) Muheim; (penalty scored) Glatzel; (penalty missed) Königsdörffer

31 January 2024 Quarter-finals	Hertha BSC	1–3	1. FC Kaiserslautern	Berlin
20:45 UTC+1	Reese 90+1'	Report	Elvedi 5'; Tachie 30'; Kaloč 69'	Stadium: Olympiastadion; Attendance: 74,245; Referee: Dr. Matthias Jöllenbeck
