= 2024–25 Hertha BSC season =

Hertha BSC
2024–25 season
- Head coach: Cristian Fiél (until 16 February); Stefan Leitl (from 17 February)
- Stadium: Olympiastadion
- 2. Bundesliga: 11th
- DFB-Pokal: Round of 16
colours	Away colours	Third colours

The 2024–25 season was the 132nd season in the history of Hertha BSC and the club's second consecutive season in the 2. Bundesliga. In addition to the domestic league, the club participated in the DFB-Pokal.

== Transfers ==
=== In ===
Pos.	Player	Transferred from	Fee	Date	Source
FW	(Turkey) Ensar Aksakal	(Turkey) Göztepe S.K.	Loan return	30 June 2024	
DF	(Germany) Julian Eitschberger	(Germany) Hallescher FC	Loan return	30 June 2024	
FW	(Ivory Coast) Wilfried Kanga	(Belgium) Standard Liège	Loan return	30 June 2024	
FW	(Comoros) Myziane Maolida	(Scotland) Hibernian	Loan return	30 June 2024	
MF	(France) Michaël Cuisance	(Italy) Venezia FC	€300,000	1 July 2024	
FW	(Germany) Luca Schuler	(Germany) 1. FC Magdeburg	Free	1 July 2024	
MF	(Germany) Diego Demme	(Italy) Napoli	Free	6 July 2024	

=== Out ===
Pos.	Player	Transferred to	Fee	Date	Source
MF	(Morocco) Aymen Barkok	(Germany) Mainz 05	Loan return	30 June 2024	
DF	(Slovakia) Peter Pekarík		End of contract	1 July 2024	
MF	(Germany) Bence Dárdai	(Germany) VfL Wolfsburg	End of contract	1 July 2024	
MF	(Germany) Suat Serdar	(Italy) Hellas Verona	€4,500,000	1 July 2024	
MF	(Germany) Veit Stange	(Germany) Borussia Mönchengladbach II		1 July 2024	
GK	(Germany) Robert Kwasigroch	(Germany) Fortuna Düsseldorf	Loan	13 July 2024	

== Friendlies ==
=== Pre-season ===
30 June 2024 Friendly	FSV Bernau (Germany)	0–7	(Germany) Hertha BSC	Bernau bei Berlin
16:00		Report	Scherhant 4', 7', 24'; Dardai 9'; Reese 20'; Christensen 47'; Niederlechner 86'	Stadium: COMPULAN - Arena

6 July 2024 Friendly	Rot-Weiß Erfurt (Germany)	0–4	(Germany) Hertha BSC	Erfurt
15:00		Report	Reese 3'; Dardai 11'; Kempf (yellow card) 32'; Tabaković 37'; Scherhant 65'; Demme (yellow card) 90+'	Referee: Marko Wartmann

10 July 2024 Friendly	SV Babelsberg (Germany)	0–1	(Germany) Hertha BSC	Potsdam
19:00			Niederlechner 86'	Stadium: Karl-Liebknecht-Stadion; Attendance: 4,464; Referee: Lars Albert

13 July 2024 Friendly	FSV Zwickau (Germany)	1–6	(Germany) Hertha BSC	Zwickau
15:00	Könnecke 53'	Report	Niederlechner 14'; Schuler 19'; Winkler 26', 34'; Sessa 59'; Scherhant 71'	Stadium: Stadion Zwickau; Attendance: 3,007; Referee: Max Kluge

16 July 2024 Friendly	Energie Cottbus (Germany)	2–2	(Germany) Hertha BSC	Cottbus
18:30	Halbauer 48'; Thiele 90+1'	Report	Tabaković 20'; Cuisance 28'	Stadium: Stadion der Freundschaft; Attendance: 5,774; Referee: Henry Müller

20 July 2024 Friendly	NEC Nijmegen (Netherlands)	0–1	(Germany) Hertha BSC	Schwaz, Austria
16:00		Report	Tabaković 16'	Stadium: Silberstadt Arena Schwaz; Referee: Alexander Pale
Note: Four periods of 30 minutes

25 July 2024 Friendly	Hertha BSC (Germany)	1–1	(Wales) Cardiff City	St. Johann in Tirol, Austria
18:00				Stadium: Koasastadion St. Johann

=== Mid-season ===
10 January 2025 Friendly	Hertha BSC (Germany)	2–0	(Germany) SV Sandhausen
15:00

19 March 2025 Friendly	Hertha BSC (Germany)	0–0	(Germany) FC St. Pauli
15:30

== Competitions ==
=== Overall record ===
Competition	First match	Last match	Starting round	Final position	Record							
Competition	First match	Last match	Starting round	Final position	Pld	W	D	L	GF	GA	GD	Win %
2. Bundesliga	3 August 2024	18 May 2025	Matchday 1		26	8	5	13	38	43	−5	30.77
DFB-Pokal	18 August 2024	4 December 2024	First round	Round of 16	3	2	0	1	8	4	+4	66.67
Total					29	10	5	14	46	47	−1	34.48

Last updated: 16 March 2025
Source: Competitions

=== 2. Bundesliga ===
==== League table ====
Pos	Team	Pld	W	D	L	GF	GA	GD	Pts
9	Hannover 96	34	13	12	9	41	36	+5	51
10	1. FC Nürnberg	34	14	6	14	60	57	+3	48
11	Hertha BSC	34	12	8	14	49	51	−2	44
12	Darmstadt 98	34	11	9	14	56	55	+1	42
13	Greuther Fürth	34	10	9	15	45	59	−14	39

Source: Bundesliga
Rules for classification: 1) Points; 2) Goal difference; 3) Goals scored; 4) Head-to-head results; 5) Head-to-head away goals scored; 6) Away goals scored; 7) Play-off.
(Rules 4–6 only apply after home and away matches have been played between the tied teams.)

==== Results summary ====
Overall								Home						Away					
Pld	W	D	L	GF	GA	GD	Pts	W	D	L	GF	GA	GD	W	D	L	GF	GA	GD
26	8	5	13	38	43	−5	29	2	2	8	13	20	−7	6	3	5	25	23	+2

Last updated: 16 March 2025.

==== Results by round ====
Round	1	2	3	4	5	6	7	8	9	10	11	12	13	14	15	16	17	18	19	20	21	22	23	24	25	26	27	28	29	30	31	32	33	34
Ground	H	A	H	A	H	A	H	A	H	A	H	A	H	A	A	H	A	A	H	A	H	A	H	A	H	A	H	A	H	A	H	H	A	H
Result	L	D	W	W	L	W	L	D	W	W	L	L	D	W	L	L	D	W	L	L	L	L	D	L	L	W	W	W	D	W	D	W	L	D
Position	13	14	11	8	9	7	7	9	7	6	8	11	12	9	11	11	12	12	12	12	13	14	14	14	14	14								11

Updated to match(es) played on 18 May 2025. Source:
A = Away; H = Home; W = Win; D = Draw; L = Loss

==== Matches ====
The match schedule was released on 4 July 2024.

3 August 2024 1	Hertha BSC	1–2	SC Paderborn	Berlin
13:00 UTC+2	Maza 72'	Report	Götze 42'; Bilbija 48'	Stadium: Olympiastadion; Attendance: 48,591; Referee: Wolfgang Haslberger

10 August 2024 2	Hamburger SV	1–1	Hertha BSC	Hamburg
20:30 UTC+2	Königsdörffer 11'	Report	Kenny 86'	Stadium: Volksparkstadion; Attendance: 57,000; Referee: Timo Gerach

24 August 2024 3	Hertha BSC	2–0	Jahn Regensburg	Berlin
13:00 UTC+2	Maza 90'; Niederlechner 90+6'	Report		Stadium: Olympiastadion; Attendance: 42,355; Referee: Richard Hempel

31 August 2024 4	1. FC Kaiserslautern	3–4	Hertha BSC	Kaiserslautern
20:30 UTC+2	Klement 32'; Opoku 45'; Tomiak 68'	Report	Schuler 28', 64'; Scherhant 51'; Cuisance 79'	Stadium: Fritz-Walter-Stadion; Attendance: 48,608; Referee: Benjamin Brand

15 September 2024 5	Hertha BSC	0–2	Fortuna Düsseldorf	Berlin
13:30 UTC+2		Report	Kownacki 13'; Niemiec 66'	Stadium: Olympiastadion; Attendance: 50,135; Referee: Michael Bacher

21 September 2024 6	1. FC Nürnberg	0–2	Hertha BSC	Nürnberg
13:00 UTC+2		Report	Scherhant 37'; Dárdai 90'	Stadium: Max-Morlock-Stadion; Attendance: 36,553; Referee: Lukas Benen

29 September 2024 7	Hertha BSC	1–4	SV Elversberg	Berlin
13:30 UTC+2	Cuisance 60'	Report	Şahin 4' (pen.), 65' (pen.); Schnellbacher 30'; Damar 52'	Stadium: Olympiastadion; Attendance: 36,500; Referee: Nicolas Winter

5 October 2024 8	Schalke 04	2–2	Hertha BSC	Gelsenkirchen
20:30 UTC+2	Karaman 24'; Mohr 33'	Report	Cuisance 9'; Prevljak 72' (pen.)	Stadium: Veltins-Arena; Attendance: 61,939; Referee: Tom Bauer

18 October 2024 9	Hertha BSC	3–1	Eintracht Braunschweig	Berlin
18:30 UTC+2	Cuisance 54' (pen.); Maza 72' (pen.); Niederlechner 83'	Report	Szabó 38'	Stadium: Olympiastadion; Attendance: 45,457; Referee: Robin Braun

26 October 2024 10	Karlsruher SC	1–3	Hertha BSC	Karlsruhe
13:00 UTC+2	Zivzivadze 45+3'	Report	Maza 9'; Zeefuik 49'; Niederlechner 58'	Stadium: Wildparkstadion; Attendance: 31,845; Referee: Florian Heft

2 November 2024 11	Hertha BSC	0–1	1. FC Köln	Berlin
20:30 UTC+1		Report	Lemperle 31'	Stadium: Olympiastadion; Attendance: 68,763; Referee: Harm Osmers

9 November 2024 12	Darmstadt 98	3–1	Hertha BSC	Darmstadt
13:00 UTC+1	Förster 45+2'; Lidberg 65'; Müller 81'	Report	Niederlechner 21'	Stadium: Merck-Stadion am Böllenfalltor; Attendance: 17,810; Referee: Patrick Alt

23 November 2024 13	Hertha BSC	2–2	SSV Ulm	Berlin
13:00 UTC+1	Maza 6'; Scherhant 52'	Report	Telalović 38'; Krattenmacher 59'	Stadium: Olympiastadion; Attendance: 41,758; Referee: Eric Weisbach

29 November 2024 14	1. FC Magdeburg	1–3	Hertha BSC	Magdeburg
18:30 UTC+1	El Hankouri 48'	Report	Scherhant 55'; Niederlechner 65'; Schuler 86'	Stadium: Avnet Arena; Attendance: 27,300; Referee: Richard Hempel

7 December 2024 15	Greuther Fürth	2–1	Hertha BSC	Fürth
13:00 UTC+1	Futkeu 38', 55'	Report	Maza 5'	Stadium: Sportpark Ronhof; Attendance: 12,125; Referee: Wolfgang Haslberger

13 December 2024 16	Hertha BSC	1–2	Preußen Münster	Berlin
18:30 UTC+1	Scherhant 28' (pen.)	Report	Kyerewaa 57'; Paetow 88'	Stadium: Olympiastadion; Attendance: 45,767; Referee: Lars Erbst

22 December 2024 17	Hannover 96	0–0	Hertha BSC	Hannover
13:30 UTC+1		Report		Stadium: Heinz von Heiden Arena; Attendance: 49,000; Referee: Daniel Schlager

19 January 2025 18	SC Paderborn	1–2	Hertha BSC	Paderborn
13:30 UTC+1	Michel 90+4'	Report	Scherhant 16'; Cuisance 69' (pen.)	Stadium: Home Deluxe Arena; Attendance: 14,280; Referee: Florian Heft

25 January 2025 19	Hertha BSC	2–3	Hamburger SV	Berlin
20:30 UTC+1	Cuisance 72'; Winkler 80'	Report	Selke 23'; Königsdörffer 61'; Sahiti 84'	Stadium: Olympiastadion; Attendance: 71,500; Referee: Tobias Welz

1 February 2025 20	Jahn Regensburg	2–0	Hertha BSC	Regensburg
13:00 UTC+1	Kühlwetter 45' (pen.); Huth 90+2'	Report		Stadium: Jahnstadion Regensburg; Attendance: 12,025; Referee: Robert Kampka

8 February 2025 21	Hertha BSC	0–1	1. FC Kaiserslautern	Berlin
20:30 UTC+1		Report	Sirch 57'	Stadium: Olympiastadion; Attendance: 47,443; Referee: Martin Petersen

15 February 2025 22	Fortuna Düsseldorf	2–1	Hertha BSC	Düsseldorf
20:30 UTC+1	Pejčinović 55', 58'	Report	Reese 13'	Stadium: Merkur Spielarena; Attendance: 38,912; Referee: Tobias Reichel

21 February 2025 23	Hertha BSC	0–0	1. FC Nürnberg	Berlin
18:30 UTC+1		Report		Stadium: Olympiastadion; Attendance: 41,752; Referee: Harm Osmers

2 March 2025 24	SV Elversberg	4–0	Hertha BSC	Spiesen-Elversberg
13:30 UTC+1	Damar 11'; Fellhauer 29'; Zimmerschied 37'; Şahin 45+3' (pen.)	Report		Stadium: Ursapharm-Arena an der Kaiserlinde; Attendance: 10,607; Referee: Frank Willenborg

8 March 2025 25	Hertha BSC	1–2	Schalke 04	Berlin
13:00 UTC+1	Reese 51'	Report	Kalas 27'; Karaman 55' (pen.)	Stadium: Olympiastadion; Attendance: 70,159; Referee: Timo Gerach

16 March 2025 26	Eintracht Braunschweig	1–5	Hertha BSC	Braunschweig
13:30 UTC+1	Tempelmann 90+1'	Report	Reese 8', 69'; Scherhant 42'; Nikolaou 44' (o.g.); Winkler 90+3'	Stadium: Eintracht-Stadion; Attendance: 22,613; Referee: Florian Badstübner

=== DFB-Pokal ===
18 August 2024 First round	Hansa Rostock	1–5	Hertha BSC	Rostock
15:30 UTC+2	Berisha 46'	Report	Scherhant 38'; Maza 66'; Winkler 75'; Niederlechner 85', 88'	Stadium: Ostseestadion; Attendance: 25,600; Referee: Robert Schröder

30 October 2024 Second round	Hertha BSC	2–1	1. FC Heidenheim	Berlin
18:00 UTC+1	Scherhant 16'; Cuisance 74'	Report	Schimmer 89'	Stadium: Olympiastadion; Attendance: 44,135; Referee: Robert Kampka

4 December 2024 Round of 16	1. FC Köln	2–1 (a.e.t.)	Hertha BSC	Cologne
18:00 UTC+1	Niederlechner 30' (o.g.); Ljubičić 120+1' (pen.)	Report	Maza 12' (pen.)	Stadium: RheinEnergieStadion; Attendance: 50,000; Referee: Tobias Reichel
