= Daniel Hanslik =

German footballer (born 1996)

Personal information
- Date of birth: 6 October 1996 (age 30)
- Place of birth: Bad Hersfeld, Germany
- Height: 1.86 m (6 ft 1 in)
- Position: Forward

Team information
- Current team: VfL Bochum
- Number: 19

Youth career
- 2000–2010: SV Unterhaun
- 2010–2010: SV Steinbach
- 2011–2015: JFV Bad Hersfeld

Senior career*
Years	Team	Apps	(Gls)
2015–2016	JFV Bad Hersfeld	30	(9)
2016–2017	SV Steinbach	31	(22)
2017–2019	VfL Wolfsburg II	50	(27)
2019	Holstein Kiel II	3	(0)
2019–2021	Holstein Kiel	1	(0)
2020	→ Hansa Rostock (loan)	17	(3)
2020–2021	→ 1. FC Kaiserslautern (loan)	27	(7)
2021–2026	1. FC Kaiserslautern	142	(23)
2026–	VfL Bochum	2	(0)
- * Club domestic league appearances and goals as of 14 August 2026

Daniel Hanslik (born 6 October 1996) is a German professional footballer who plays as a forward for 2. Bundesliga club VfL Bochum.

== Club career ==
=== Youth career ===
Hanslik grew up in the northeast of Hesse and was trained in football from the age of four at the local clubs SV Unterhaun, SV Steinbach and JFV Bad Hersfeld, where he mainly played in defense. At Bad Hersfeld and Steinbach, Hanslik, who was initially used in midfield in addition to the attack, had his first experiences in the men's division in the sixth class Verbandsliga Hessen and in the Hessenliga. As a result, Hanslik even played for Arsenal, but was not signed for the club's youth teams.

=== First experiences in the Regionalliga ===
Scoring 33 goals in 64 competitive games for both clubs, VfL Wolfsburg became aware of the attacker and signed him in the summer of 2017. Hanslik's advisor at the time, Kujtim Mustafi, father of the German national player Shkodran Mustafi, arranged the contact to the club. There, Hanslik trained more often with the professionals during the international or winter breaks, but was only used in the Regionalliga team. Here, Hanslik continued to prove his scoring threat and scored 30 goals in 52 competitive games. He was able to net three times in the two relegation games to the 3. Liga against FC Bayern Munich II in spring 2019.

=== Career jump into the 2. Bundesliga ===
The next step in his career followed for the striker, when he was signed by the 2. Bundesliga club Holstein Kiel for three years in March 2019. In the 1–1 draw against FC Erzgebirge Aue on 1 September 2019, 22-year old Hanslik was in the starting line-up, making it his first time in professional football.

During the winter break, Kiel loaned the attacker to 3. Liga club FC Hansa Rostock until the end of the season. During the second half of the season, Hanslik made 17 appearances (three goals) in Rostock and one in the 2019–20 Verbandspokal.

On 5 October 2020, Hanslik was loaned out again, this time to fellow 3. Liga club 1. FC Kaiserslautern until the end of the 2020–21 season. Hanslik scored the winning goal for Kaiserslautern in their promotion playoff against Dynamo Dresden, helping the team to earn promotion to the 2. Bundesliga for the first time since 2018.

On 28 May 2026, Hanslik moved to VfL Bochum.

== Career statistics ==
As of match played on 23 August 2026

Appearances and goals by club, season and competition
Club	Season	League			Cup		Other		Total	
Club	Season	Division	Apps	Goals	Apps	Goals	Apps	Goals	Apps	Goals
SV Steinbach	2016–17	Oberliga Hessen	31	22	—		—		31	22
VfL Wolfsburg II	2017–18	Regionalliga Nord	21	8	—		—		21	8
VfL Wolfsburg II	2018–19	Regionalliga Nord	29	19	—		2 (Note: Appearances in the Regionalliga playoff.)	3	31	22
VfL Wolfsburg II	Total		50	27	—		2	3	52	30
Holstein Kiel	2019–20	2. Bundesliga	1	0	1	0	—		2	0
Hansa Rostock (loan)	2019–20	3. Liga	17	3	—		—		17	3
1. FC Kaiserslautern (loan)	2020–21	3. Liga	27	7	—		—		27	7
1. FC Kaiserslautern	2021–22	2. Bundesliga	33	5	1	0	3 (Note: One appearance in Southwestern Cup, two appearances in play-offs)	0	37	1
1. FC Kaiserslautern	2022–23	2. Bundesliga	27	3	1	0	—		28	3
1. FC Kaiserslautern	2023–24	2. Bundesliga	24	4	4	0	—		28	4
1. FC Kaiserslautern	2024–25	2. Bundesliga	31	8	2	0	—		33	8
1. FC Kaiserslautern	2025–26	2. Bundesliga	25	3	3	1	—		28	4
1. FC Kaiserslautern	Total		142	23	11	1	3	0	156	24
VfL Bochum	2026–27	2. Bundesliga	2	0	1	0	—		3	0
Career total			270	82	13	1	4	3	287	86
