= Nader El-Jindaoui =

German footballer (born 1996)

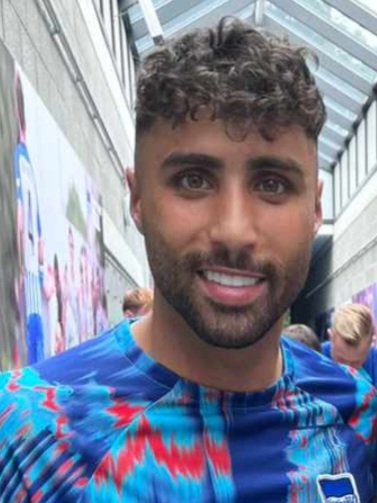
- El-Jindaoui in 2023

Personal information
- Date of birth: 16 November 1996 (age 29)
- Place of birth: Berlin-Kreuzberg, Germany
- Height: 1.72 m (5 ft 7 1/2 in)
- Position: Winger

Team information
- Current team: TSG 1899 Hoffenheim II
- Number: 30

Youth career
- 2007–2009: Nord Wedding
- 2009–2010: Füchse Berlin
- 2010–2011: Tennis Borussia Berlin
- 2011–2014: Energie Cottbus
- 2014–2015: Chemnitz

Senior career*
Years	Team	Apps	(Gls)
2016–2018	Babelsberg	32	(0)
2018–2019	Greuther Fürth II	20	(3)
2019–2020	Fortuna Düsseldorf II	14	(0)
2020–2022	Berliner AK 07	47	(16)
2022–2024	Hertha BSC II	46	(8)
2023–2024	Hertha BSC	1	(0)
2025	Ventura County FC	11	(0)
2025–	TSG 1899 Hoffenheim II	25	(0)
- * Club domestic league appearances and goals as of 30 May 2026

Nader El-Jindaoui (Arabic: نادر الجنداوي; born 16 November 1996) is a German influencer and professional footballer who plays as a winger for 3. Liga team TSG 1899 Hoffenheim II.

== Playing career ==
El-Jindaoui is a youth product of Nord Wedding, Füchse Berlin, Tennis Borussia Berlin, Energie Cottbus and Chemnitz. He left Energie Cottbus due to a bout with epilepsy, and a series of injuries caused by the epilepsy medication led to him being released by Chemnitz. On 6 November 2016, after months on trial he signed a professional contract with Babelsberg in the Regionalliga. In 2018, he moved to Greuther Fürth's reserves for a season, and followed that up with a stint with Fortuna Düsseldorf's reserves.

In the summer of 2020, he returned to Berlin signing with Berliner AK 07, and had his most prolific seasons to date. On 3 June 2022, he joined Hertha's reserves. On 4 July 2023, he extended his contract with Hertha for another season. He made his professional debut with Hertha BSC in a 3–3 (5–3) DFB Pokal penalty shootout win over Hamburg on 6 December 2023.

On 28 June 2025, El-Jindaoui signed with TSG 1899 Hoffenheim II that is making its debut in 3. Liga, it is a reserve team of TSG 1899 Hoffenheim.

== Personal life ==
Born in Germany, El-Jindaoui is of Palestinian descent. He is married and has a daughter named Imani born in 2021. He has a son named Nidal born in 2024. With his wife Louisa he is an influencer with over four million subscribers on TikTok and over two million subscribers on YouTube and Instagram.

== Career statistics ==
As of match played 16 May 2026

Appearances and goals by club, season and competition
Club	Season	League			National cup (Note: Includes DFB-Pokal, U.S. Open Cup)		League cup		Other		Total	
Club	Season	Division	Apps	Goals	Apps	Goals	Apps	Goals	Apps	Goals	Apps	Goals
Babelsberg	2016–17	Regionalliga Nordost	10	0	—		—		—		10	0
Babelsberg	2017–18	Regionalliga Nordost	22	1	—		—		5 (Note: Appearance(s) in Brandenburg Cup)	0	27	1
Babelsberg	Total		32	1	0	0	0	0	5	0	37	1
Greuther Fürth II	2018–19	Regionalliga Bayern	20	3	—		—		—		20	3
Fortuna Düsseldorf II	2019–20	Regionalliga West	14	0	—		—		—		14	0
Berliner AK 07	2020–21	Regionalliga Nordost	12	2	—		—		3 (Note: Appearance(s) in Berlin Cup)	2	15	4
Berliner AK 07	2021–22	Regionalliga Nordost	35	14	—		—		5	2	40	16
Berliner AK 07	Total		47	16	0	0	0	0	8	4	55	20
Hertha BSC II	2022–23	Regionalliga Nordost	21	6	—		—		—		21	6
Hertha BSC II	2023–24	Regionalliga Nordost	25	2	—		—		—		25	2
Hertha BSC II	Total		46	8	0	0	0	0	0	0	46	8
Hertha BSC	2023–24	2. Bundesliga	1	0	1	0	—		—		2	0
Ventura County	2025	MLS Next Pro	11	0	1	0	—		—		12	0
TSG 1899 Hoffenheim II	2025–26	3. Liga	25	0	—		—		—		25	0
Career total			196	28	2	0	0	0	13	4	211	32
