= Pascal Klemens =

German footballer

Personal information
- Date of birth: 23 January 2005 (age 21)
- Place of birth: Berlin, Germany
- Height: 1.86 m (6 ft 1 in)
- Position: Centre-back

Team information
- Current team: Hertha BSC
- Number: 41

Youth career
- 1.FC Wacker Lankwitz
- Hertha Zehlendorf
- 2015–2023: Hertha BSC

Senior career*
Years	Team	Apps	(Gls)
2023–	Hertha BSC II	9	(1)
2023–	Hertha BSC	64	(2)

International career^{‡}
2021	Germany U17	3	(0)
2022–2023	Germany U18	3	(0)
2023–	Germany U19	7	(0)
- * Club domestic league appearances and goals as of 18 May 2026 ‡ National team caps and goals as of 23:38, 13 April 2024 (UTC)

Pascal Klemens (born 23 January 2005) is a German professional footballer who plays as a centre-back for 2. Bundesliga club Hertha BSC.

== Club career ==
Klemens is a youth product of 1.FC Wacker Lankwitz and Hertha Zehlendorf, before finishing his development at Hertha BSC. After captaining their U19s, he started playing with Hertha BSC II in the Regionalliga in January 2023. He made his senior and professional debut with Hertha as a starter in a 2–1 Bundesliga win over VfL Wolfsburg on 27 May 2023. On 29 May 2023, he signed his first professional contract with Hertha until 2026.

== International career ==
Klemens is a youth international for Germany, having played up to the Germany U19s.

== Playing style ==
A striker in his youth, Klemens developed as a versatile centre-back in Hertha BSC's academy with strong leadership skills. In the 2023–24 season, he was played mostly deployed as a defensive midfielder and relished the increased time on the ball.

== Career statistics ==
As of match played 22 November 2026

Appearances and goals by club, season and competition
Club	Season	League			DFB-Pokal		Other		Total	
Club	Season	Division	Apps	Goals	Apps	Goals	Apps	Goals	Apps	Goals
Hertha BSC	2022–23	Bundesliga	1	0	0	0	0	0	1	0
Hertha BSC	2023–24	2. Bundesliga	22	1	3	0	0	0	25	1
Hertha BSC	2024–25	2. Bundesliga	24	0	3	0	0	0	27	0
Hertha BSC	2025–26	2. Bundesliga	7	1	1	0	0	0	8	1
Hertha BSC	2026-27	2. Bundesliga	10	0	2	0	0	0	12	0
Hertha BSC	Total		64	2	9	0	0	0	73	2
Hertha BSC II	2022–23	Regionalliga Nordost	3	0	—		0	0	3	0
Hertha BSC II	2023–24	Regionalliga Nordost	1	0	—		0	0	1	0
Hertha BSC II	2024–25	Regionalliga Nordost	2	1	—		0	0	2	1
Hertha BSC II	2025–26	Regionalliga Nordost	1	0	—		0	0	1	0
Hertha BSC II	Total		7	1	0	0	0	0	7	1
Career total			59	3	7	0	0	0	66	3
