= Marten Winkler =

German footballer

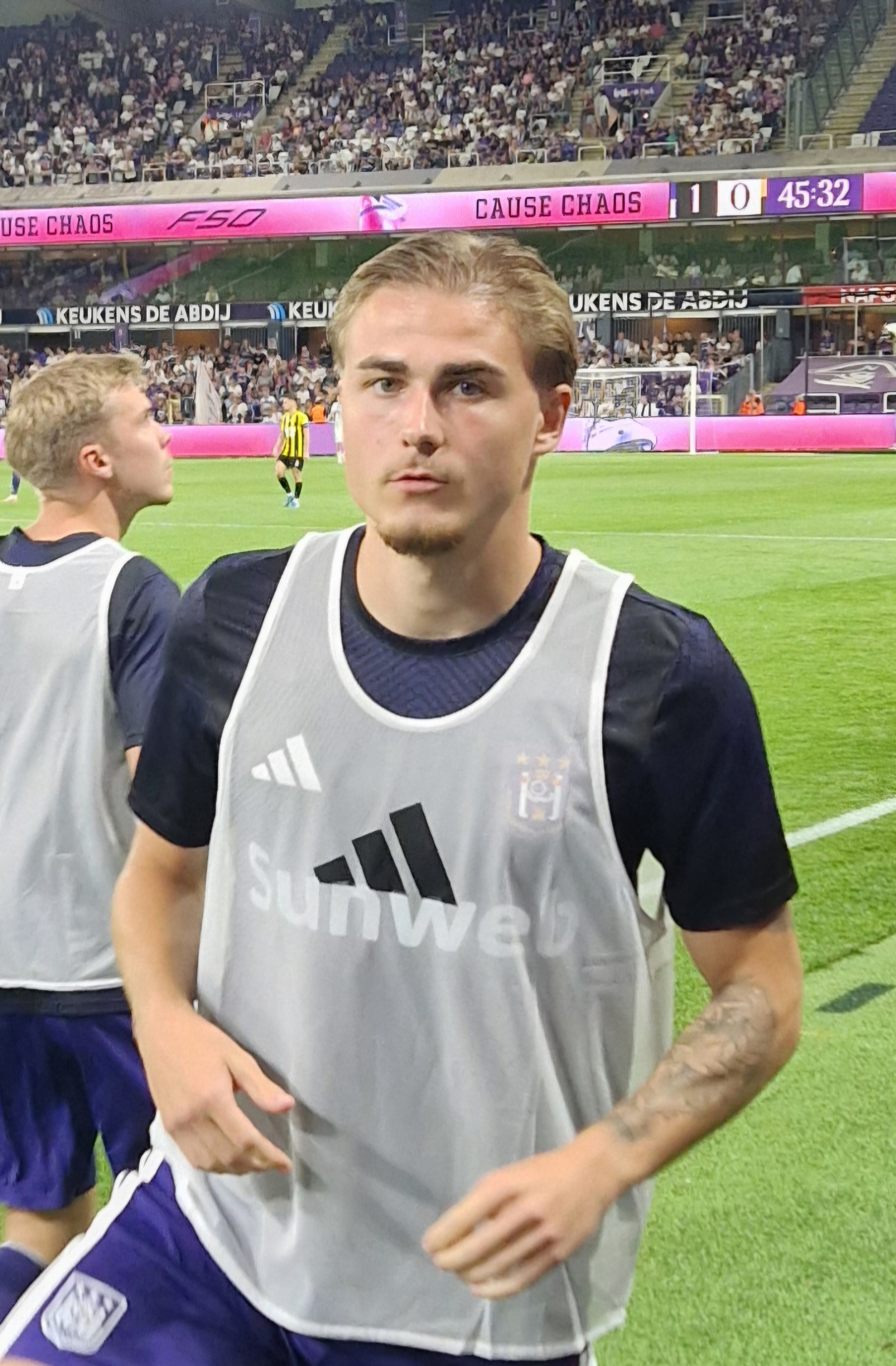
- Marten Winkler, RSC Anderlecht (2026)

Personal information
- Date of birth: 31 October 2002 (age 24)
- Place of birth: Frankfurt an der Oder, Germany
- Height: 1.82 m (6 ft 0 in)
- Position: Forward

Team information
- Current team: Anderlecht
- Number: 10

Youth career
- Union Fürstenwalde
- –2015: Union Berlin
- 2015–2020: Hertha BSC

Senior career*
Years	Team	Apps	(Gls)
2020–2023	Hertha BSC II	27	(8)
2021–2026	Hertha BSC	85	(14)
2022–2023	→ Waldhof Mannheim (loan)	31	(9)
2022–2023	→ Waldhof Mannheim II (loan)	1	(0)
2026–	Anderlecht	6	(2)

International career
2019	Germany U18	1	(0)
- * Club domestic league appearances and goals as of 25 October 2026

Marten Winkler (born 31 October 2002) is a German professional footballer who plays as a forward for Belgian Pro League club Anderlecht.

== Club career ==
Winkler was born in Frankfurt an der Oder. After playing youth football for Union Fürstenwalde and Union Berlin, he joined Hertha BSC's academy in 2015. He made his debut for Hertha BSC on 15 May 2021 as a substitute in a 0–0 draw with 1. FC Köln.

In July 2022, he joined Waldhof Mannheim on a season-long loan.

Following Hertha's relegation to the 2. Bundesliga at the end of the 2022–23 season, Winkler broke into the Hertha first-team at the start of the 2023–24 season, and in October 2023, his contract with the club was extended until summer 2027.

On 17 August 2026, Winkler signed a four-year contract with Anderlecht in Belgium.

== International career ==
He has represented Germany at under-18 level.

== Style of play ==
Winkler plays primarily as a striker, though can also play as a winger.

== Career statistics ==
As of match played 25 October 2026

Appearances and goals by club, season and competition
Club	Season	League			National cup (Note: Includes DFB-Pokal)		Europe		Other		Total	
Club	Season	Division	Apps	Goals	Apps	Goals	Apps	Goals	Apps	Goals	Apps	Goals
Hertha BSC II	2020–21	Regionalliga Nordost	4	0	—		—		—		4	0
Hertha BSC II	2021–22	Regionalliga Nordost	23	8	—		—		—		23	8
Hertha BSC II	Total		27	8	—		—		—		27	8
Hertha BSC	2020–21	Bundesliga	1	0	—		—		—		1	0
Hertha BSC	2021–22	Bundesliga	1	0	—		—		—		1	0
Hertha BSC	2023–24	2. Bundesliga	30	5	1	0	—		—		31	5
Hertha BSC	2024–25	2. Bundesliga	20	2	2	1	—		—		22	3
Hertha BSC	2025–26	2. Bundesliga	31	6	4	1	—		—		35	7
Hertha BSC	2026–27	2. Bundesliga	2	1	—		—		—		2	1
Hertha BSC	Total		85	14	7	2	—		—		92	16
Waldhof Mannheim (loan)	2022–23	3. Liga	31	9	0	0	—		2 (Note: Appearances in Baden Cup)	2	33	11
Waldhof Mannheim II (loan)	2022–23	Verbandsliga Nordbaden	1	0	—		—		—		1	0
Anderlecht	2026–27	Belgian Pro League	6	2	1	0	5 (Note: Appearances in UEFA Europa League)	1	—		12	3
Career total			150	33	8	2	5	1	2	2	165	38
