= Frank Ronstadt =

German footballer

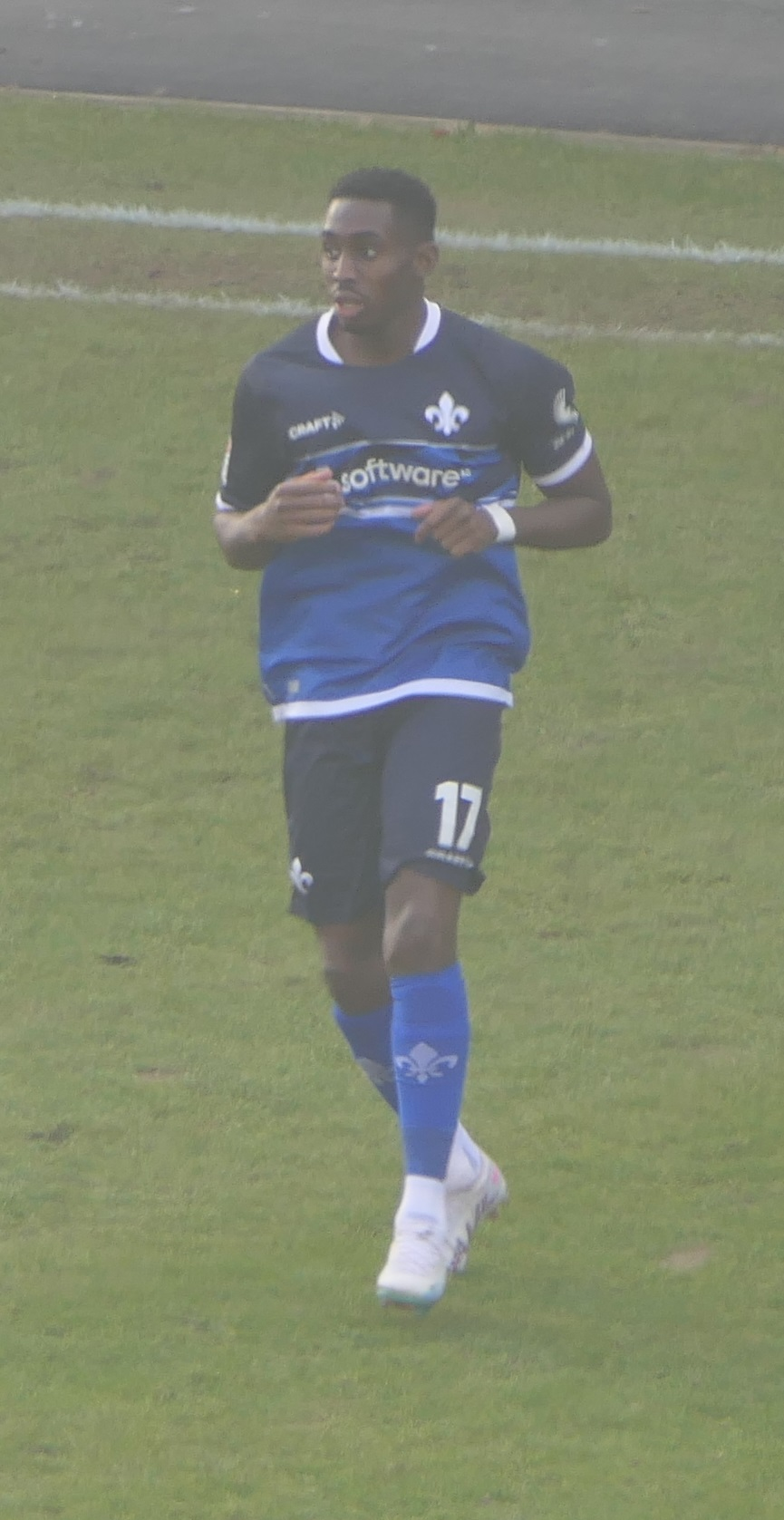
- Ronstadt in 2023

Personal information
- Date of birth: 21 July 1997 (age 29)
- Place of birth: Hamburg, Germany
- Height: 1.79 m (5 ft 10 in)
- Positions: Right midfielder; right-back

Youth career
- –2011: FC St. Pauli
- 2011–2016: Hamburger SV

Senior career*
Years	Team	Apps	(Gls)
2016–2018	Hamburger SV II	53	(4)
2016–2017	Hamburger SV	0	(0)
2018–2019	Werder Bremen II	30	(0)
2019–2021	Würzburger Kickers	52	(2)
2021–2024	Darmstadt 98	41	(2)
2024–2026	1. FC Kaiserslautern	17	(0)
2025–2026	→ Viktoria Köln (loan)	29	(1)

International career
2013	Germany U16	2	(0)
2013	Germany U17	2	(0)
2015	Germany U19	1	(0)
- * Club domestic league appearances and goals as of 30 August 2026

Frank Ronstadt (born 21 July 1997) is a German professional footballer who plays as a right midfielder or right-back.

== Career ==
In May 2021 it was announced that Ronstadt would be joining 2. Bundesliga club SV Darmstadt 98 from Würzburger Kickers, who had been relegated from the league, for the forthcoming 2021–22 season.

On 2 January 2024, Ronstadt signed with 1. FC Kaiserslautern in 2. Bundesliga.

On 2 September 2025, Ronstadt was loaned to 3. Liga club Viktoria Köln.

== International career ==
Born in Germany, Ronstadt is of Ghanaian descent. He is a youth international for Germany.
