= Luca Sirch =

German footballer

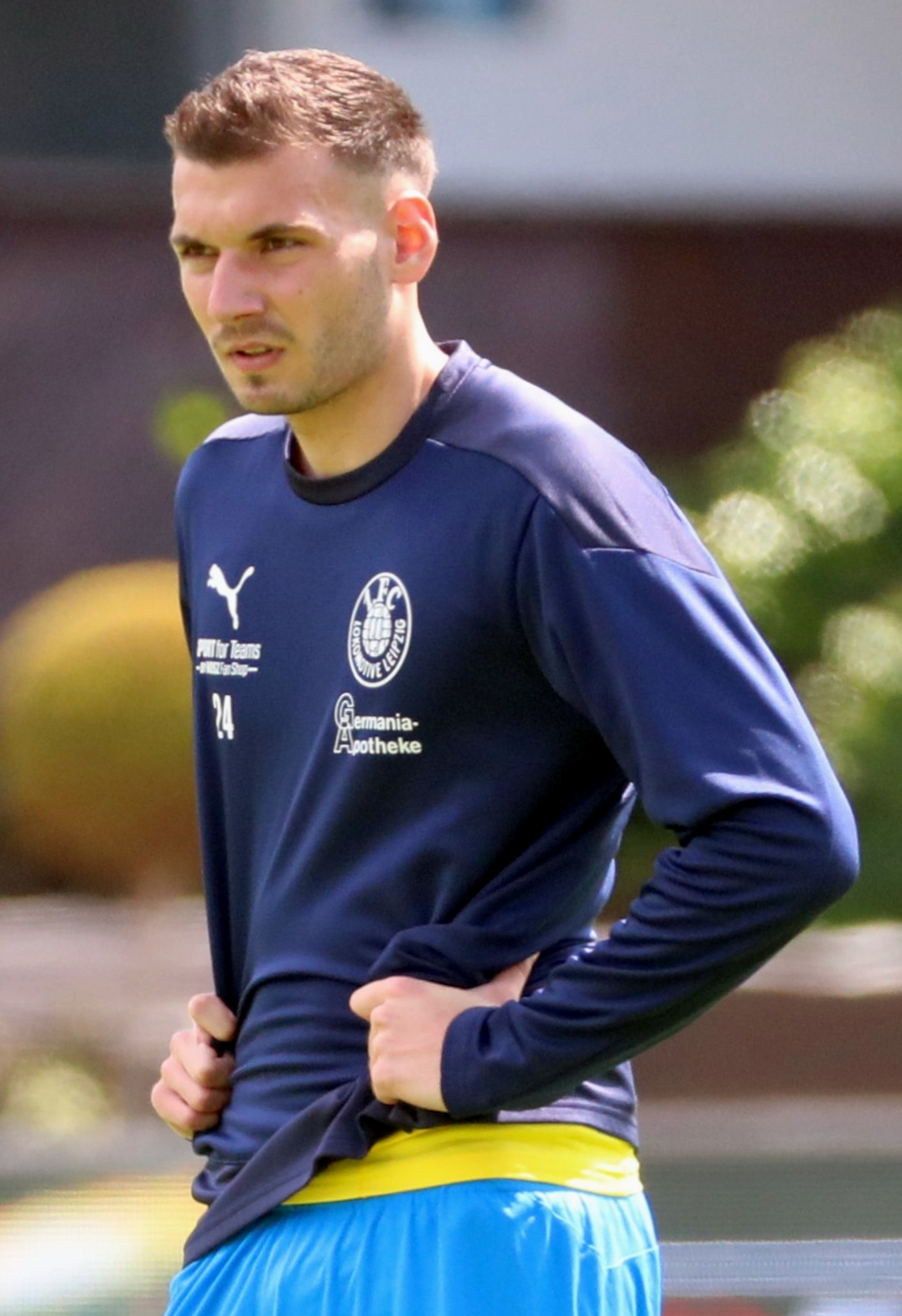
- Sirch in 2024

Personal information
- Full name: Luca Sirch
- Date of birth: 14 June 1999 (age 27)
- Place of birth: Augsburg, Germany
- Height: 1.86 m (6 ft 1 in)
- Position: Centre-back

Team information
- Current team: SV Elversberg
- Number: 26

Youth career
- FC Königsbrunn
- 2016–2017: FC Memmingen

Senior career*
| Years | Team | Apps | (Gls) |
| 2017–2019 | FC Memmingen II | 39 | (4) |
| 2018–2020 | FC Memmingen | 22 | (2) |
| 2020–2024 | 1. FC Lokomotive Leipzig | 109 | (17) |
| 2024 | 1. FC Kaiserslautern II | 4 | (0) |
| 2024–2026 | 1. FC Kaiserslautern | 60 | (5) |
| 2026– | SV Elversberg | 7 | (0) |
- * Club domestic league appearances and goals as of 22:30, 30 October 2026 (UTC)

Luca Sirch (born 14 June 1999) is a German footballer who plays as a centre-back for the Bundesliga club SV Elversberg.

== Club career ==
Sirch is a product of the youth academies of the German clubs FC Königsbrunn and FC Memmingen. He began his senior career with Memmingen in the Regionalliga, before transferring to 1. FC Lokomotive Leipzig on 21 September 2020. In 2024, he joined the 2. Bundesliga club 1. FC Kaiserslautern. On 21 July 2026, he joined newly promoted Bundesliga club SV Elversberg on a contract until 2029.

== Career statistics ==
As of match played 30 October 2026

Appearances and goals by club, season and competition
| Club | Season | League | | | Cup | | Other | | Total | |
| Club | Season | Division | Apps | Goals | Apps | Goals | Apps | Goals | Apps | Goals |
|---|---|---|---|---|---|---|---|---|---|---|
| FC Memmingen II | 2017–18 | Landesliga Bayern | 27 | 2 | — | | — | | 27 | 2 |
| FC Memmingen II | 2018–19 | Landesliga Bayern | 12 | 2 | — | | — | | 12 | 2 |
| FC Memmingen II | Total | | 39 | 4 | — | | — | | 39 | 4 |
| FC Memmingen | 2018–19 | Regionalliga Bayern | 1 | 0 | — | | 1 (Note: Appearances in Bavarian Cup) | 0 | 2 | 0 |
| FC Memmingen | 2019–20 | Regionalliga Bayern | 21 | 2 | — | | 3 | 1 | 24 | 3 |
| FC Memmingen | Total | | 22 | 2 | — | | 4 | 1 | 26 | 3 |
| 1. FC Lokomotive Leipzig | 2020–21 | Regionalliga Nordost | 4 | 1 | — | | 3 (Note: Appearances in Saxony Cup) | 0 | 7 | 1 |
| 1. FC Lokomotive Leipzig | 2021–22 | Regionalliga Nordost | 38 | 1 | 1 | 0 | 2 | 0 | 41 | 1 |
| 1. FC Lokomotive Leipzig | 2022–23 | Regionalliga Nordost | 34 | 2 | — | | 6 | 0 | 40 | 2 |
| 1. FC Lokomotive Leipzig | 2023–24 | Regionalliga Nordost | 33 | 13 | 1 | 0 | 4 | 2 | 38 | 15 |
| 1. FC Lokomotive Leipzig | Total | | 109 | 17 | 2 | 0 | 15 | 2 | 126 | 19 |
| 1. FC Kaiserslautern II | 2024–25 | Oberliga Rheinland-Pfalz/Saar | 4 | 0 | — | | — | | 4 | 0 |
| 1. FC Kaiserslautern | 2024–25 | 2. Bundesliga | 27 | 4 | 1 | 0 | — | | 28 | 4 |
| 1. FC Kaiserslautern | 2025–26 | 2. Bundesliga | 33 | 1 | 3 | 0 | — | | 34 | 1 |
| 1. FC Kaiserslautern | Total | | 60 | 5 | 4 | 0 | — | | 64 | 5 |
| SV Elversberg | 2026–27 | Bundesliga | 7 | 0 | 2 | 0 | — | | 9 | 0 |
| Career total | | | 241 | 28 | 8 | 0 | 19 | 3 | 266 | 31 |

== Honours ==
1. FC Lokomotive Leipzig

- Saxony Cup: 2020–21, 2022–23
