= Derry Scherhant =

German footballer (born 2002)

Personal information
- Full name: Derry Lionel Scherhant
- Date of birth: 10 November 2002 (age 24)
- Place of birth: Berlin, Germany
- Height: 1.85 m (6 ft 1 in)
- Positions: Forward; winger

Team information
- Current team: SC Freiburg
- Number: 7

Youth career
- 2017–2019: Viktoria Berlin
- 2019–2020: Tennis Borussia Berlin
- 2020: Berliner SC
- 2020–2021: Hertha BSC

Senior career*
Years	Team	Apps	(Gls)
2021–2024	Hertha BSC II	55	(30)
2022–2025	Hertha BSC	72	(10)
2025–	SC Freiburg	40	(7)

International career^{‡}
2023	Germany U20	2	(0)
2025–	Germany U21	2	(0)
2026–	Germany	4	(1)
- * Club domestic league appearances and goals as of 21:10, 18 November 2026 (UTC) ‡ National team caps and goals as of 22:41, 16 November 2026 (UTC)

Derry Lionel Scherhant (born 10 November 2002) is a German professional footballer who plays as a forward and winger for Bundesliga club SC Freiburg and the Germany national team.

== Club career ==
Scherhant was born and raised in Berlin, Germany, the son of a Cameroonian father and a German mother. He is a youth product of Viktoria Berlin, Tennis Borussia Berlin, and Berliner SC, before moving to the youth academy of Hertha BSC in 2020. In the summer of 2021, he was promoted to their B-team in the Regionalliga where he scored 16 goals in 34 appearances in his first season. He signed a professional contract with the senior Hertha BSC squad on 17 June 2022 until 2025. He made his professional debut with Hertha BSC as a late substitute in a 1–1 Bundesliga tie with Eintracht Frankfurt on 13 August 2022. On 12 February 2023, he scored his first professional goal in the Bundesliga in the 91st minute with 4-1 win over Borussia Mönchengladbach. On 24 July 2023, he signed a professional contract with Hertha BSC until 2027.

He made use of his release clause to move to SC Freiburg for 2 million euros in 2025 which was officially announced on 21 May 2025.

== International career ==
Scherhant was born in Germany to a Cameroonian father and German mother. In September 2026, Scherhant was one of players who were called up with the Germany national team by head coach Jürgen Klopp for the 2026–27 UEFA Nations League matches against Netherlands, Greece, Serbia and Greece between 24 September and 4 October 2026.

== Career statistics ==
=== Club ===
As of match played 8 November 2026

Appearances and goals by club, season and competition
Club	Season	League			DFB-Pokal		Europe		Other		Total	
Club	Season	Division	Apps	Goals	Apps	Goals	Apps	Goals	Apps	Goals	Apps	Goals
Hertha BSC II	2021–22	Regionalliga Nordost	34	16	—		—		—		34	16
Hertha BSC II	2022–23	Regionalliga Nordost	12	8	—		—		—		12	8
Hertha BSC II	2023–24	Regionalliga Nordost	9	6	—		—		—		9	6
Hertha BSC II	Total		55	30	—		—		—		55	30
Hertha BSC	2022–23	Bundesliga	10	1	0	0	—		—		10	1
Hertha BSC	2023–24	2. Bundesliga	28	2	3	0	—		—		31	2
Hertha BSC	2024–25	2. Bundesliga	34	7	3	2	—		—		37	9
Hertha BSC	Total		72	10	6	2	—		—		78	12
SC Freiburg	2025–26	Bundesliga	31	5	5	1	13 (Note: Appearances in UEFA Europa League)	1	—		49	7
SC Freiburg	2026–27	Bundesliga	9	2	1	0	4 (Note: Appearances in UEFA Conference League)	1	—		14	3
SC Freiburg	Total		40	7	6	1	17	2	—		63	10
Career total			167	47	12	3	17	2	0	0	196	52

=== International ===
As of match played 16 November 2026

Appearances and goals by national team and year
National team	Year	Apps	Goals
Germany	2026	4	1
Total		4	1

As of match played 16 November 2026

Germany score listed first, score column indicates score after each Scherhant goal.

List of international goals scored by Derry Scherhant
No.	Date	Venue	Cap	Opponent	Score	Result	Competition
1	16 November 2026	Olympiastadion, Berlin, Germany	4	Netherlands	1–0	5–0	2026–27 UEFA Nations League A

== Honours ==
SC Freiburg

- UEFA Europa League runner-up: 2025–26
