= Luca Schuler (footballer) =

German footballer

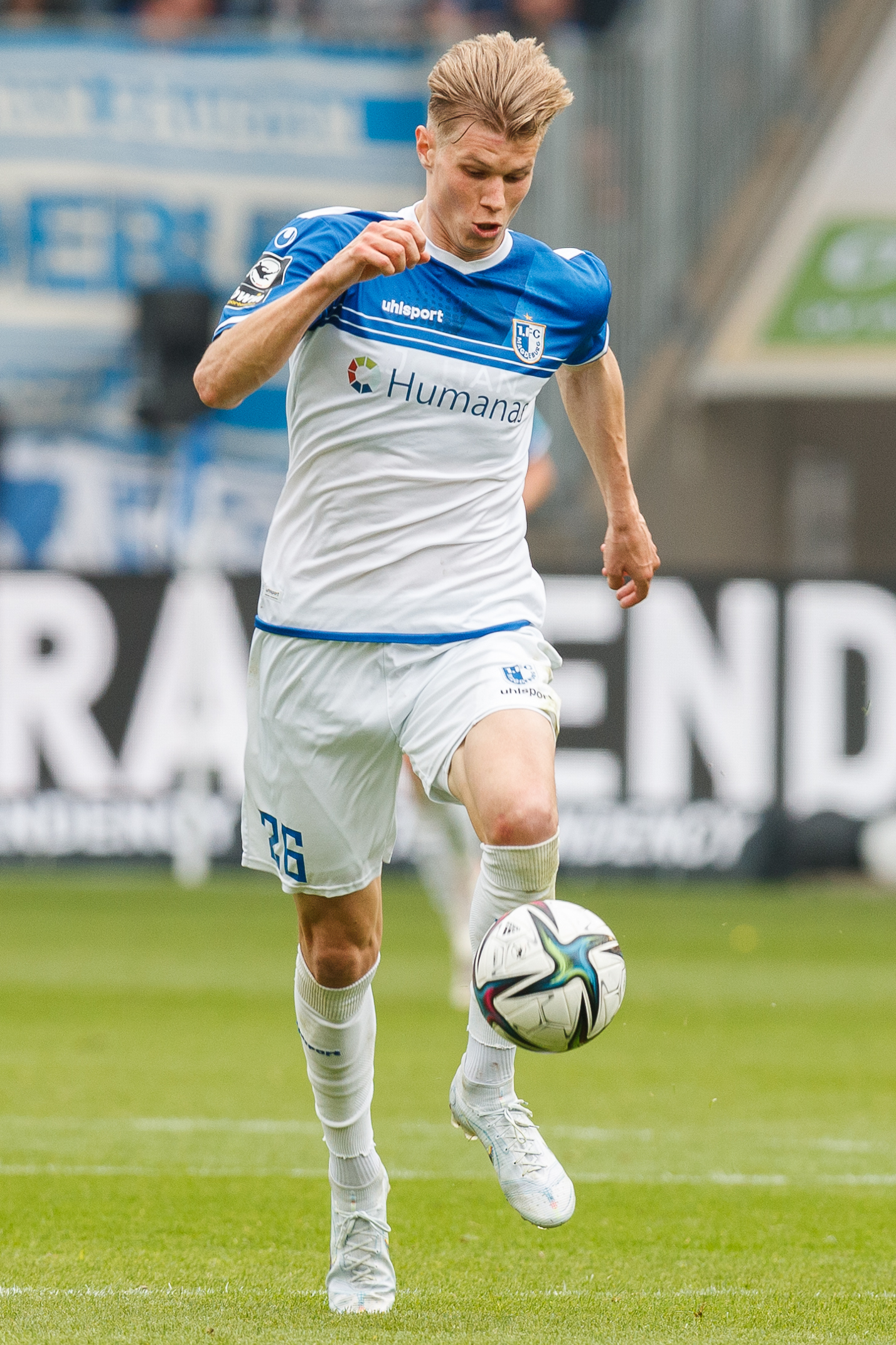
- Schuler in 2022 with 1. FC Magdeburg

Personal information
- Full name: Jan Luca Schuler
- Date of birth: 22 March 1999 (age 27)
- Place of birth: Neustadt an der Weinstraße, Germany
- Height: 1.90 m (6 ft 3 in)
- Position: Forward

Team information
- Current team: Hertha BSC
- Number: 18

Youth career
- 2003–2004: TuS Niederkirchen
- 2004–2006: SV 05 Meckenheim
- 2006–2016: 1. FC Kaiserslautern
- 2016–2017: SV Elversberg
- 2017–2018: 1. FC Saarbrücken

Senior career*
Years	Team	Apps	(Gls)
2017–2018	1. FC Saarbrücken	0	(0)
2018–2020	1. FC Köln II	12	(0)
2020–2021	Schalke 04 II	39	(12)
2020–2021	Schalke 04	2	(0)
2021–2024	1. FC Magdeburg	72	(19)
2024–	Hertha BSC	47	(12)
- * Club domestic league appearances and goals as of 18 May 2026

Jan Luca Schuler (born 22 March 1999) is a German professional footballer who plays as a forward for 2. Bundesliga club Hertha BSC.

== Career ==
Schuler began playing football at the age of 3 with Niederkirchen, and continued his development at the youth academies of Meckenheim, 1. FC Kaiserslautern, SV Elversberg, and 1. FC Saarbrücken. He signed his first professional contract with 1. FC Köln II in March 2018.

Schuler made his professional debut for Schalke 04 in the Bundesliga on 28 November 2020, coming on as a substitute in the 81st minute for Matthew Hoppe against Borussia Mönchengladbach. The away match finished as a 4–1 loss.

On 22 May 2024, Hertha BSC announced that Schuler has agreed to join the club on a three-year contract upon the expiration of his contract with Magdeburg.
