= 2024–25 SpVgg Greuther Fürth season =

SpVgg Greuther Fürth
2024–25 season
- Head coach: Alexander Zorniger (until 21 October); Leonhard Haas (caretaker, 22 October – 11 November); Jan Siewert (from 12 November)
- Stadium: Sportpark Ronhof Thomas Sommer
- 2. Bundesliga: 13th
- DFB-Pokal: Second round
- Top goalscorer: League: Noel Futkeu (11); All: Noel Futkeu (11)
Home colours	Away colours	Third colours

The 2024–25 season was the 122nd season in the history of SpVgg Greuther Fürth, and their third consecutive season in the 2. Bundesliga. In addition to the domestic league, the club participated in the DFB-Pokal.

== Players ==
=== First-team squad ===
As of 5 February 2025

Note: Flags indicate national team as defined under FIFA eligibility rules; some limited exceptions apply. Players may hold more than one non-FIFA nationality.

No.	Pos.	Nation	Player
1	GK	GER	Nils Körber
2	DF	GER	Simon Asta
5	DF	GER	Reno Münz
6	MF	BFA	Sacha Bansé
7	FW	GER	Dennis Srbeny
9	FW	GER	Noel Futkeu
10	FW	SWE	Branimir Hrgota (captain)
11	MF	GER	Roberto Massimo
14	MF	GER	Jomaine Consbruch
15	DF	GER	Joshua Quarshie (on loan from TSG Hoffenheim)
17	DF	GER	Niko Gießelmann
18	DF	GER	Marco Meyerhöfer
21	DF	GER	Kerim Çalhanoğlu
22	FW	SRB	Nemanja Motika (on loan from Olimpija Ljubljana)

No.	Pos.	Nation	Player
23	DF	GER	Gideon Jung
24	MF	GER	Marco John
25	DF	SUI	Noah Loosli (on loan from VfL Bochum)
27	DF	GER	Gian-Luca Itter
28	FW	GER	Jannik Mause (on loan from 1. FC Kaiserslautern)
30	MF	GER	Felix Klaus
31	GK	GER	Lennart Grill (on loan from Union Berlin)
33	DF	USA	Maximilian Dietz
34	MF	GER	Denis Pfaffenrot
36	MF	GER	Philipp Müller
37	MF	USA	Julian Green
42	GK	GER	Moritz Schulze
44	GK	GER	Nahuel Noll (on loan from TSG Hoffenheim)

=== Out on loan ===
Note: Flags indicate national team as defined under FIFA eligibility rules; some limited exceptions apply. Players may hold more than one non-FIFA nationality.

No. / Pos. / Nation / Player; — / DF / GER / Matti Wagner (at Rot-Weiss Essen until 30 June 2025)	No. / Pos. / Nation / Player; — / FW / GER / Leander Popp (at SpVgg Unterhaching until 30 June 2025)

== Transfers ==
=== In ===
Pos.	Player	Transferred from	Fee	Date	Source
DF	(Germany) Reno Münz	(Germany) Bayer Leverkusen U19	Free	1 July 2024	
FW	(Germany) Noel Futkeu	(Germany) Eintracht Frankfurt II	Undisclosed	1 July 2024	
FW	(Austria) Marlon Mustapha	(Italy) Como	Loan	25 July 2024	
MF	(Burkina Faso) Sacha Banse	(Belgium) Standard Liège	Undisclosed	24 August 2024	
MF	(Serbia) Nemanja Motika	(Slovenia) Olimpija Ljubljana	Loan	30 August 2024	

=== Out ===
Pos.	Player	Transferred to	Fee	Date	Source
DF	(Tunisia) Oussama Haddadi	(United Arab Emirates) Dibba Al-Hisn	End of contract	1 July 2024	
FW	(Austria) Marlon Mustapha	(Italy) Como	End of loan	5 February 2025	

== Friendlies ==
=== Pre-season ===
26 June 2024 Friendly	TSV Neudrossenfeld (Germany)	1–6	(Germany) Greuther Fürth	Kasendorf
18:30	Majczyna 45'	Report	Popp 8'; Näpflein 10'; Futkeu 36'; Itter 71'; Pfaffenroth 75'; Michalski 86'	Stadium: Kasendorf Stadion

29 June 2024 Friendly	Eintracht Bamberg (Germany)	0–5	(Germany) Greuther Fürth	Hirschaid
15:00		Report	Srbeny 15'; Green 35' (pen.); Consbruch 52' (pen.); Pfaffenroth 76' (pen.); Futkeu 86' (pen.)	Stadium: Sportanlage TSV Hirschaid; Attendance: 800

2 July 2024 Friendly	SpVgg Bayreuth (Germany)	2–4	(Germany) Greuther Fürth	Bayreuth
18:00	Fenninger 59'; Scheder 72'		Wagner 2'; Green 49'; Futkeu 50'; Çalhanoğlu 82'	Stadium: Hans-Walter-Wild-Stadion

6 July 2024 Friendly	Greuther Fürth (Germany)	2–1	(Czech Republic) FK Pardubice
16:00	Futkeu 42'; Gießelmann 57'		Jindra 44'

12 July 2024 Friendly	WSG Tirol (Austria)	2–2	(Germany) Greuther Fürth
17:00

19 July 2024 Friendly	Greuther Fürth (Germany)	3–1	(Germany) FC St. Pauli	Kufstein, Austria
18:00
Note: Two periods of 60 minutes

26 July 2024 Friendly	SC Freiburg (Germany)	1–1	(Germany) Greuther Fürth
14:00

=== Mid-season ===
5 January 2025 Friendly	Greuther Fürth (Germany)	0–0	(Germany) SpVgg Unterhaching
13:00

20 March 2025 Friendly	Greuther Fürth (Germany)	3–1	(Germany) Jahn Regensburg
13:00

== Competitions ==
=== Overall record ===
Competition	First match	Last match	Starting round	Final position	Record							
Competition	First match	Last match	Starting round	Final position	Pld	W	D	L	GF	GA	GD	Win %
2. Bundesliga	4 August 2024	18 May 2025	Matchday 1	13th	34	10	9	15	45	59	−14	29.41
DFB-Pokal	17 August 2024	29 October 2024	First round	Second round	2	1	0	1	2	1	+1	50.00
Total					36	11	9	16	47	60	−13	30.56

Source: Soccerway

=== 2. Bundesliga ===
==== League table ====
Pos	Team	Pld	W	D	L	GF	GA	GD	Pts
11	Hertha BSC	34	12	8	14	49	51	−2	44
12	Darmstadt 98	34	11	9	14	56	55	+1	42
13	Greuther Fürth	34	10	9	15	45	59	−14	39
14	Schalke 04	34	10	8	16	52	62	−10	38
15	Preußen Münster	34	8	12	14	40	43	−3	36

Source: Bundesliga
Rules for classification: 1) Points; 2) Goal difference; 3) Goals scored; 4) Head-to-head results; 5) Head-to-head away goals scored; 6) Away goals scored; 7) Play-off.
(Rules 4–6 only apply after home and away matches have been played between the tied teams.)

==== Results summary ====
Overall								Home						Away					
Pld	W	D	L	GF	GA	GD	Pts	W	D	L	GF	GA	GD	W	D	L	GF	GA	GD
34	10	9	15	45	59	−14	39	6	5	6	26	30	−4	4	4	9	19	29	−10

Source: FotMob

==== Results by round ====
Round	1	2	3	4	5	6	7	8	9	10	11	12	13	14	15	16	17	18	19	20	21	22	23	24	25	26	27	28	29	30	31	32	33	34
Ground	H	A	H	A	H	A	H	A	H	A	H	A	H	A	H	H	A	A	H	A	H	A	H	A	H	A	H	A	H	A	H	A	H	H
Result	W	D	D	W	D	L	L	D	L	W	L	L	L	D	W	W	L	L	L	W	W	L	W	W	D	L	D	L	D	L	L	L	D	W
Position	2	2	6	3	6	8	10	10	12	11	13	13	14	13	13	12	14	14	15	14	11	12	11	11	12	12	12	14	14	14	14	14	14	13

A = Away; H = Home; W = Win; D = Draw; L = Loss

==== Matches ====
The match schedule was released on 4 July 2024.

4 August 2024 1	Greuther Fürth	3–1	Preußen Münster	Fürth
13:30 CEST (UTC+2)	Green 25' (pen.); Srbeny 50'; Jung (yellow card) 2' (goal) 55'	Report	Batmaz 41'; ter Horst (yellow card) 54'; Lorenz (yellow card) 83'	Stadium: Sportpark Ronhof Thomas Sommer; Attendance: 12,664; Referee: Richard Hempel

9 August 2024 2	1. FC Kaiserslautern	2–2	Greuther Fürth	Kaiserslautern
18:30	Heuer (yellow card) 30'; Hanslik 45+1'; Tomiak (yellow card) 45+3'; Elvedi (yellow card) 79'; Ache 84'	Report	Green 31' (pen.); Futkeu 38'; Srbeny (yellow card) 76'	Stadium: Fritz-Walter-Stadion; Attendance: 41,623; Referee: Florian Lechner

24 August 2024 3	Greuther Fürth	1–1	SC Paderborn	Fürth
13:00 CEST (UTC+2)	Massimo (yellow card) 29'; Itter 49'	Report	Castaneda (yellow card) 43'; Michel (yellow card) 60'; Grimaldi 81'; Götze (yellow card) 89'	Stadium: Sportpark Ronhof Thomas Sommer; Attendance: 10,261; Referee: Robin Braun

30 August 2024 4	Jahn Regensburg	0–4	Greuther Fürth	Regensburg
18:30 CEST (UTC+2)	Ernst (yellow card) 12'; Saller (yellow card) 56'; Ballas (yellow card) 62'	Report	Meyerhöfer 4'; Futkeu 49'; Hrgota 77'; Massimo (yellow card) 81'; Banse (yellow card) 86'; Green 88'	Stadium: Jahnstadion Regensburg; Attendance: 13,105; Referee: Patrick Schwengers

15 September 2024 5	Greuther Fürth	0–0	SV Elversberg	Fürth
13:30 CEST (UTC+2)	Jung (yellow card) 52'; Srbeny (yellow card) 55'; Hrgota (yellow card) 90+5'	Report	Feil (yellow card) 76'	Stadium: Sportpark Ronhof Thomas Sommer; Attendance: 10,877; Referee: Eric-Dominic Weisbach

21 September 2024 6	Eintracht Braunschweig	2–0	Greuther Fürth	Braunschweig
13:00 CEST (UTC+2)	Philippe 33', 60'; Krauße (yellow card) 53'; Rittmüller (yellow card) 59'; Ivanov (yellow card) 84'	Report	Giesselmann (yellow card) 16'; Massimo (yellow card) 37'; Motika (yellow card) 59'; Jung (yellow card) 76'; Hrgota (yellow card) 83'; Srbeny (yellow card) 90'	Stadium: Eintracht-Stadion; Attendance: 19,018; Referee: Lars Erbst

27 September 2024 7	Greuther Fürth	1–2	Fortuna Düsseldorf	Fürth
18:30 CEST (UTC+2)	Srbeny 45'; Zorniger (yellow card) 45+2'; Jung (yellow card) 90+6'	Report	Haag 43'; Hoffmann (yellow card) 75'; Ísak 90+1' (pen.)	Stadium: Sportpark Ronhof Thomas Sommer; Attendance: 12,405; Referee: Matthias Jöllenbeck

6 October 2024 8	1. FC Magdeburg	2–2	Greuther Fürth	Magdeburg
13:30 CEST (UTC+2)	El Hankouri 15'; Kaars 18'; Hugonet (yellow card) 59'; Musonda (yellow card) 81'; Itō (yellow card) 89'	Report	Green 42' (pen.); Futkeu 75'	Stadium: MDCC-Arena; Attendance: 22,615; Referee: Bastian Dankert

20 October 2024 9	Greuther Fürth	0–4	1. FC Nürnberg	Fürth
13:30 CEST (UTC+2)	Hrgota (yellow card) 32'; Motika (yellow card) 83'	Report	Emreli 13'; Tzimas 18', 34'; Emreli (yellow card) 56'; Tzimas (yellow card) 64'; Schleimer 88'	Stadium: Sportpark Ronhof Thomas Sommer; Attendance: 16,126; Referee: Florian Exner

26 October 2024 10	FC Schalke 04	3–4	Greuther Fürth	Gelsenkirchen
13:00 CET (UTC+1)	Sánchez (yellow card) 27' (yellow-red card) 48'; Grüger 32' (yellow card) 56'; Kalas (yellow card) 71'; Seguin 78'; Mohr (yellow card) 80'; Bulut 90+2'; Donkor (yellow card) 90+3'	Report	Bansé (yellow card) 19'; Massimo 23', 39'; Michalski 27'; Green (yellow card) 44'; Futkeu 62'; Srbeny (yellow card) 77'	Stadium: Veltins-Arena; Attendance: 60,344; Referee: Patrick Alt

2 November 2024 11	Greuther Fürth	1–5	SV Darmstadt 98	Fürth
13:00 CET (UTC+1)	Futkeu (yellow card) 49'; Hrgota 90'	Report	Förster 30'; Lakenmacher 40'; Lidberg 45+3'; Corredor 51'; López 77'	Stadium: Sportpark Ronhof Thomas Sommer; Attendance: 11,161; Referee: Max Burda

9 November 2024 12	1. FC Köln	1–0	Greuther Fürth	Cologne
13:00 CET (UTC+1)	Heintz (yellow card) 44'; Downs (yellow card) 90+1' (goal) 90+4'	Report	Futkeu (yellow card) 44'; Michalski (yellow card) 45'; Dietz (yellow card) 64'; Jung (yellow card) 90+1'	Stadium: RheinEnergieStadion; Attendance: 49,600; Referee: Daniel Schlager

23 November 2024 13	Greuther Fürth	2–3	Karlsruher SC	Fürth
13:00 CET (UTC+1)	Hrgota 20'; Srbeny (yellow card) 43'; Banse 83'; Michalski (yellow card) 90+1'	Report	Zivzivadze 46'; Conté 73'; Schleusener 79' (yellow card) 85'; Jensen (yellow card) 82'	Stadium: Sportpark Ronhof Thomas Sommer; Attendance: 12,143; Referee: Lukas Benen

1 December 2024 14	SSV Ulm 1846	1–1	Greuther Fürth	Ulm
13:30 CET (UTC+1)	Thiede (yellow card) 32'; Telalović 45+1' (pen.); Allgeier (yellow card) 54'; Keller (yellow card) 59'; Hyryläinen (yellow card) 67'; Strompf (yellow card) 77'	Report	Green 16' (pen.); Giesselmann (yellow card) 45+3'; Banse (yellow card) 45+9'; Meyerhofer (yellow card) 64'; Müller (yellow card) 86'	Stadium: Donaustadion; Attendance: 15,400; Referee: Patrick Schwengers

7 December 2024 15	Greuther Fürth	2–1	Hertha BSC	Fürth
13:00 CET (UTC+1)	Futkeu 38', 55'; Dietz (yellow card) 53' (yellow-red card) 77'; Jung (yellow card) 68'; Noll (yellow card) 80'	Report	Maza 5'; Cuisance (yellow card) 54'; Dardai (yellow card) 88'; Ernst (yellow card) 90+6'	Stadium: Sportpark Ronhof Thomas Sommer; Attendance: 12,125; Referee: Wolfgang Haslberger

15 December 2024 16	Greuther Fürth	1–0	Hannover 96	Fürth
13:30 CET (UTC+1)	Banse (yellow card) 19'; Green (yellow card) 67'; Futkeu 83'	Report	Neumann (yellow card) 24'	Stadium: Sportpark Ronhof Thomas Sommer; Attendance: 12,334; Referee: Tobias Reichel

21 December 2024 17	Hamburger SV	5–0	Greuther Fürth	Hamburg
13:00 CET (UTC+1)	Hadžikadunić 1' (yellow card) 54'; Selke 11', 59'; Karabec 13'; Pherai (yellow card) 24'; Strange 76'	Report	Mustapha (yellow card) 35'	Stadium: Volksparkstadion; Attendance: 54,786; Referee: Timo Gerach

18 January 2025 18	Preußen Münster	2–1	Greuther Fürth	Münster
13:00 CET (UTC+1)	Frenkert (yellow card) 7'; Mees 10', 90'; Hendrix (yellow card) 30'; ter Horst (yellow card) 47'	Report	Asta (yellow card) 4' (yellow-red card) 32'; Giesselmann 28'; Futkeu (yellow card) 30'; Körber (yellow card) 38'; Dietz (yellow card) 90'	Stadium: Preußenstadion; Attendance: 11,791; Referee: Nicolas Winter

24 January 2025 19	Greuther Fürth	2–4	1. FC Kaiserslautern	Fürth
18:30 CET (UTC+1)	Müller 6' (red card) 84'; Giesselmann (yellow card) 45+3'; Hrgota 67'	Report	Ritter 28'; Yokota 52'; Hanslik (yellow card) 60'; Kaloč 73'; Gyamerah (yellow card) 80' (yellow-red card) 86'; Kleinhansl (yellow card) 86'; Aremu (yellow card) 90+1'; Ache 90+3'	Stadium: Sportpark Ronhof Thomas Sommer; Attendance: 13,590; Referee: Felix Prigan

2 February 2025 20	SC Paderborn	1–2	Greuther Fürth	Paderborn
13:30 CET (UTC+1)	Riemann (red card) 26'; Hoffmeier (yellow card) 43'; Michel (yellow card) 45+1'; Grimaldi 63'; Ansah (yellow card) 90+2'	Report	Hrgota 21'; Green (yellow card) 35'; Srbeny (yellow card) 45+2'; Loosli 50'	Stadium: Home Deluxe Arena; Attendance: 12,310; Referee: Richard Hempel

7 February 2025 21	Greuther Fürth	2–1	Jahn Regensburg	Fürth
18:30 CET (UTC+1)	Consbruch 31'; Srbeny 37'; Loosli (yellow card) 64'	Report	Adamyan 7'; Ziegele (yellow card) 77'; Breunig (yellow card) 90+3'; Gebhardt (yellow card) 90+6'	Stadium: Sportpark Ronhof Thomas Sommer; Attendance: 12,586; Referee: Florian Lechner

15 February 2025 22	SV Elversberg	2–0	Greuther Fürth	Spiesen-Elversberg
13:00 CET (UTC+1)	Asllani 6'; Sickinger 45+1'; Petkov (yellow card) 67' (yellow-red card) 90+4'	Report	Dietz (yellow card) 55'; Hrgota (yellow card) 62'	Stadium: URSAPHARM-Arena an der Kaiserlinde; Attendance: 8,623; Referee: Patrick Schwengers

23 February 2025 23	Greuther Fürth	3–0	Eintracht Braunschweig	Fürth
13:30 CET (UTC+1)	Futkeu 10'; Meyerhofer (yellow card) 22'; Loosli (yellow card) 38'; Noll (yellow card) 78'; Itter (yellow card) 86'; Green 88'; Consbruch 90+8'	Report	Tempelmann (yellow card) 33'; Di Michele (yellow card) 67'; Hoffmann (yellow card) 79'	Stadium: Sportpark Ronhof Thomas Sommer; Attendance: 11,032; Referee: Wolfgang Haslberger

28 February 2025 24	Fortuna Düsseldorf	1–2	Greuther Fürth	Düsseldorf
18:30 CET (UTC+1)	Jóhannesson 8' (yellow card) 90+1'; Pejčinović (yellow card) 26'; Siebert (yellow card) 37'	Report	Hrgota 9'; Klaus (yellow card) 19'; Green 75'	Stadium: Merkur Spiel-Arena; Attendance: 32,598; Referee: Harm Osmers

8 March 2025 25	Greuther Fürth	1–1	1. FC Magdeburg	Fürth
13:00 CET (UTC+1)	Futkeu 17' (yellow card) 57'; Loosli (yellow card) 41'	Report	Atik 20'; Müller (yellow card) 60'; Heber (yellow card) 73'	Stadium: Sportpark Ronhof Thomas Sommer; Attendance: 12,930; Referee: Timo Gansloweit

16 March 2025 26	1. FC Nürnberg	3–0	Greuther Fürth	Nuremberg
13:30 CET (UTC+1)	Justvan 4', 39'; Jander (yellow card) 21'; Lubach (yellow card) 43'; Tzimas 45+4'; Seidel (yellow card) 90+2'	Report	Green (yellow card) 18'; Consbruch (yellow card) 85'	Stadium: Max-Morlock-Stadion; Attendance: 47,300; Referee: Tobias Reichel

30 March 2025 27	Greuther Fürth	3–3	FC Schalke 04	Fürth
13:30 CEST (UTC+2)	Massimo 11'; Hrgota (yellow card) 18'; Consbruch 26'; Noll (yellow card) 53'; Srbeny 54'	Report	Karaman 9' (yellow card) 53'; Schallenberg (yellow card) 44'; Younes 84'; Sylla 90+5' (yellow card) 90+7'	Stadium: Sportpark Ronhof Thomas Sommer; Attendance: 16,126; Referee: Tom Bauer

5 April 2025 28	SV Darmstadt 98	1–0	Greuther Fürth	Darmstadt
13:00 CEST (UTC+2)	Lidberg 79'	Report	Loosli (yellow card) 85'	Stadium: Merck-Stadion am Böllenfalltor; Attendance: 16,820; Referee: Lars Erbst

11 April 2025 29	Greuther Fürth	1–1	1. FC Köln	Fürth
13:30 CEST (UTC+2)	Futkeu 12'; Dietz (yellow card) 89'	Report	Schmied (yellow card) 13'; Kainz (yellow card) 38'; Waldschmidt 45'; Lemperle (yellow card) 56'; Huseinbašić (yellow card) 70'; Uth (yellow card) 71'; Ljubičić (yellow card) 82'	Stadium: Sportpark Ronhof Thomas Sommer; Attendance: 15,294; Referee: Patrick Alt

20 April 2025 30	Karlsruher SC	1–0	Greuther Fürth	Karlsruhe
13:30 CEST (UTC+2)	Burnić (yellow card) 50'; Rapp (yellow card) 68'; Wanitzek 75'; Franke (yellow card) 83'	Report	Dietz (yellow card) 76'; Klaus (yellow card) 79'	Stadium: Wildparkstadion; Attendance: 26,155; Referee: Florian Heft

25 April 2025 31	Greuther Fürth	0–1	SSV Ulm 1846	Fürth
13:30 CEST (UTC+2)	Asta (yellow card) 51'; Quarshie (yellow card) 86'	Report	Krattenmacher 62' (yellow card) 77'; Brandt (yellow card) 90+4'	Stadium: Sportpark Ronhof Thomas Sommer; Attendance: 14,425; Referee: Eric-Dominic Weisbach

4 May 2025 32	Hertha BSC	1–0	Greuther Fürth	Berlin
13:30 CEST (UTC+2)	Reese 16'; Dárdai (yellow card) 38'; Leistner (yellow card) 52'	Report	Loosli (yellow card) 70'	Stadium: Olympiastadion; Attendance: 48,047; Referee: Robert Kampka

11 May 2025 33	Greuther Fürth	1–1	Hannover 96	Fürth
13:30 CEST (UTC+2)	Gindorf (yellow card) 12'; Lee (yellow card) 49'; Leopold (yellow card) 61'; Kunze (yellow card) 76'; Wdowik (yellow card) 83'	Report	Futkeu 33'; Dietz (yellow card) 57'	Stadium: Sportpark Ronhof Thomas Sommer; Attendance: 36,500; Referee: Richard Hempel

18 May 2025 34	Greuther Fürth	3–2	Hamburger SV	Fürth
15:30 CEST (UTC+2)	John (yellow card) 17'; Klaus 41', 57' (pen.), 63' (yellow card) 87'; Jung (yellow card) 90'; Gießelmann (yellow card) 90+7'; Kleine (yellow card) 90+7'	Report	Dompé 50'; Glatzel 67' (pen.); Selke (yellow card) 90'	Stadium: Sportpark Ronhof Thomas Sommer; Attendance: 16,126; Referee: Robert Schröder

=== DFB-Pokal ===
17 August 2024 First round	Schott Mainz	0–2	Greuther Fürth	Mainz
13:00 CEST (UTC+2)		Report	Srbeny 8'; Mustapha 82'	Stadium: Bruchwegstadion; Attendance: 4,235; Referee: Felix Prigan

29 October 2024 Second round	Jahn Regensburg	1–0	Greuther Fürth	Regensburg
20:45 CET (UTC+1)	Ernst (yellow card) 10'; Hein (yellow card) 25'; Bulić 59' (red card) 63'; Pröger (yellow card) 70'; Gebhardt (yellow card) 90+4'	Report	Michalski (yellow card) 14'; Massimo (yellow card) 71'; Meyerhöfer (yellow card) 80'	Stadium: Jahnstadion Regensburg; Attendance: 11,627; Referee: Tom Bauer
