= 2023–24 SpVgg Greuther Fürth season =

SpVgg Greuther Fürth
2023–24 season
- Head coach: Alexander Zorniger
- Stadium: Sportpark Ronhof Thomas Sommer
- 2. Bundesliga: 8th
- DFB-Pokal: Second round
- Top goalscorer: League: Branimir Hrgota (11); All: Branimir Hrgota (12)
- Average home league attendance: 12,503

The 2023–24 season was SpVgg Greuther Fürth's 121st season in existence and second consecutive in the 2. Bundesliga. They also competed in the DFB-Pokal.

== Players ==
=== First-team squad ===
As of 6 September 2023

Note: Flags indicate national team as defined under FIFA eligibility rules; some limited exceptions apply. Players may hold more than one non-FIFA nationality.

No.	Pos.	Nation	Player
1	GK	SWE	Andreas Linde
2	DF	GER	Simon Asta
3	DF	MAR	Oualid Mhamdi
4	DF	POL	Damian Michalski
5	DF	TUN	Oussama Haddadi
7	FW	GER	Dennis Srbeny
10	FW	SWE	Branimir Hrgota (captain)
11	FW	NGR	Dickson Abiama
13	MF	GER	Orestis Kiomourtzoglou
14	MF	GER	Jomaine Consbruch
16	FW	BUL	Lukas Petkov (on loan from FC Augsburg)
17	DF	GER	Niko Gießelmann

No.	Pos.	Nation	Player
18	DF	GER	Marco Meyerhöfer
19	FW	GER	Tim Lemperle (on loan from 1. FC Köln)
21	DF	GER	Kerim Çalhanoğlu
22	MF	GER	Robert Wagner (on loan from SC Freiburg)
23	DF	GER	Gideon Jung
25	GK	GER	Leon Schaffran
27	DF	GER	Gian-Luca Itter
30	FW	GER	Armindo Sieb
31	MF	GER	Devin Angleberger
33	DF	USA	Maximilian Dietz
37	MF	USA	Julian Green
40	GK	GER	Jonas Urbig (on loan from 1. FC Köln)

=== Out on loan ===
Note: Flags indicate national team as defined under FIFA eligibility rules; some limited exceptions apply. Players may hold more than one non-FIFA nationality.

No. / Pos. / Nation / Player; — / GK / FIN / Lasse Schulz (at Viborg FF until 30 June 2024)	No. / Pos. / Nation / Player; — / FW / GER / Nico Grimbs (at FAC until 30 June 2024)

== Transfers ==
=== In ===
Pos.	Player	Transferred from	Fee	Date	Source
MF	(Germany) Jomaine Consbruch	(Germany) Arminia Bielefeld	Free	1 July 2023	
DF	(Germany) Kerim Çalhanoğlu	(Germany) Schalke 04	€150k	1 July 2023	
MF	(Germany) Orestis Kiomourtzoglou	(Scotland) Heart of Midlothian	€150k	7 July 2023	

=== Out ===
Pos.	Player	Transferred from	Fee	Date	Source

== Competitions ==
=== Overall record ===
Competition	First match	Last match	Starting round	Final position	Record							
Competition	First match	Last match	Starting round	Final position	Pld	W	D	L	GF	GA	GD	Win %
2. Bundesliga	28 July 2023	19 May 2024	Matchday 1	8th	34	14	8	12	50	49	+1	41.18
DFB-Pokal	12 August 2023	31 October 2023	First round	Second round	2	1	0	1	2	2	+0	50.00
Total					36	15	8	13	52	51	+1	41.67

Source: Soccerway

=== 2. Bundesliga ===
==== League table ====
Pos	Team	Pld	W	D	L	GF	GA	GD	Pts
6	Hannover 96	34	13	13	8	59	44	+15	52
7	SC Paderborn	34	15	7	12	54	54	0	52
8	Greuther Fürth	34	14	8	12	50	49	+1	50
9	Hertha BSC	34	13	9	12	69	59	+10	48
10	Schalke 04	34	12	7	15	53	60	−7	43

Source: DFB
Rules for classification: 1) Points; 2) Goal difference; 3) Goals scored; 4) Head-to-head results; 5) Head-to-head away goals scored; 6) Away goals scored; 7) Play-off.
(Rules 4–6 only apply after home and away matches have been played between the tied teams.)

==== Results summary ====
Overall								Home						Away					
Pld	W	D	L	GF	GA	GD	Pts	W	D	L	GF	GA	GD	W	D	L	GF	GA	GD
34	14	8	12	50	49	+1	50	10	4	3	33	20	+13	4	4	9	17	29	−12

Source: DFB

==== Results by round ====
Round	1	2	3	4	5	6	7	8	9	10	11	12	13	14	15	16	17	18	19	20	21	22	23	24	25	26	27	28	29	30	31	32	33	34
Ground	H	A	H	A	H	A	H	A	H	A	H	A	H	H	A	H	A	A	H	A	H	A	H	A	H	A	H	A	H	A	A	H	A	H
Result	W	L	D	L	L	D	W	D	W	L	W	W	W	W	W	D	D	W	W	L	L	L	W	L	L	L	D	L	W	L	W	D	D	W
Position	1	9	8	12	13	16	13	13	10	14	10	6	6	5	5	4	5	4	2	4	4	5	4	5	7	7	7	8	8	9	9	7	9	8

Source: DFB
A = Away; H = Home; W = Win; D = Draw; L = Loss

==== Matches ====
The league fixtures were unveiled on 30 June 2023.

30 July 2023 1	Greuther Fürth	5–0	SC Paderborn 07	Fürth
13:30 UTC+2	Hrgota 35', 45+3'; Lemperle 43'; Sieb 65'; Michalski 77'	Report		Stadium: Sportpark Ronhof Thomas Sommer; Attendance: 10,547; Referee: Richard Hempel

5 August 2023 2	Holstein Kiel	2–1	Greuther Fürth	Kiel
13:00 UTC+2	Sterner 68'; Machino 70'	Report	Hrgota 63'	Stadium: Holstein-Stadion; Attendance: 11,790; Referee: Tobias Reichel

19 August 2023 3	Greuther Fürth	0–0	FC St. Pauli	Fürth
13:00 UTC+2		Report		Stadium: Sportpark Ronhof Thomas Sommer; Attendance: 12,207; Referee: Tom Bauer

26 August 2023 4	Hertha BSC	5–0	Greuther Fürth	Berlin
13:00 UTC+2	Tabaković 23', 77'; Winkler 31'; Dárdai 46'; Prevljak 66'	Report		Stadium: Olympiastadion; Attendance: 35,291; Referee: Tobias Stieler

3 September 2023 5	Greuther Fürth	1–3	Hannover 96	Fürth
13:30 UTC+2	Green 50'	Report	Tresoldi 16'; Köhn 22'; Halstenberg 57'	Stadium: Sportpark Ronhof Thomas Sommer; Attendance: 10,091; Referee: Timo Gerach

15 September 2023 6	1. FC Nürnberg	1–1	Greuther Fürth	Nuremberg
18:30 UTC+2	Uzun 45+1' (pen.)	Report	Michalski 8'	Stadium: Max-Morlock-Stadion; Attendance: 47,000; Referee: Robert Hartmann

23 September 2023 7	Greuther Fürth	4–3	Karlsruher SC	Fürth
13:00 UTC+2	Lemperle 5'; Abiama 12', 45+5'; Michalski 64'	Report	Bormuth 7'; Wanitzek 25'; Stindl 45+4'	Stadium: Sportpark Ronhof Thomas Sommer; Attendance: 11,090; Referee: Patrick Ittrich

1 October 2023 8	SV Elversberg	1–1	Greuther Fürth	Spiesen-Elversberg
13:30 UTC+2	Feil 9'	Report	Hrgota 14'	Stadium: Waldstadion an der Kaiserlinde; Attendance: 8,042; Referee: Tom Bauer

7 October 2023 9	Greuther Fürth	1–0	Hansa Rostock	Fürth
13:00 UTC+2	Roßbach 33' (o.g.)	Report		Stadium: Sportpark Ronhof Thomas Sommer; Attendance: 13,856; Referee: Alexander Sather

21 October 2023 10	Hamburger SV	2–0	Greuther Fürth	Hamburg
13:00 UTC+2	Meffert 16'; Glatzel 45+4'	Report		Stadium: Volksparkstadion; Attendance: 55,800; Referee: Robert Schröder

27 October 2023 11	Greuther Fürth	4–0	VfL Osnabrück	Fürth
18:30 UTC+2	Green 45'; Sieb 47'; Abiama 74'; Lemperle 75'	Report		Stadium: Sportpark Ronhof Thomas Sommer; Attendance: 9,978; Referee: Robin Braun

4 November 2023 12	1. FC Kaiserslautern	0–2	Greuther Fürth	Kaiserslautern
13:00 UTC+1		Report	Jung 22'; Green 54' (pen.)	Stadium: Fritz-Walter-Stadion; Attendance: 40,302; Referee: Felix Zwayer

12 November 2023 13	Greuther Fürth	1–0	Fortuna Düsseldorf	Fürth
13:30 UTC+1	Wagner 48'	Report		Stadium: Sportpark Ronhof Thomas Sommer; Attendance: 10,790; Referee: Max Burda

26 November 2023 14	Greuther Fürth	2–0	Wehen Wiesbaden	Fürth
13:30 UTC+1	Sieb 20'; Hrgota 84'	Report		Stadium: Sportpark Ronhof Thomas Sommer; Attendance: 9,576; Referee: Frank Willenborg

2 December 2023 15	Eintracht Braunschweig	0–1	Greuther Fürth	Braunschweig
13:00 UTC+1		Report	Green 31' (pen.)	Stadium: Eintracht-Stadion; Attendance: 17,570; Referee: Daniel Schlager

9 December 2023 16	Greuther Fürth	1–1	1. FC Magdeburg	Fürth
13:00 UTC+1	Lemperle 59'	Report	El Hankouri 90+5'	Stadium: Sportpark Ronhof Thomas Sommer; Attendance: 11,000; Referee: Florian Heft

15 December 2023 17	Schalke 04	2–2	Greuther Fürth	Gelsenkirchen
18:30 UTC+1	Topp 30'; Karaman 74'	Report	Hrgota 50'; Asta 77'	Stadium: Veltins-Arena; Attendance: 60,166; Referee: Daniel Siebert

21 January 2024 18	SC Paderborn	0–1	Greuther Fürth	Paderborn
13:30 UTC+1		Report	Sieb 33'	Stadium: Home Deluxe Arena; Attendance: 10,975; Referee: Max Burda

28 January 2024 19	Greuther Fürth	2–1	Holstein Kiel	Fürth
13:30 UTC+1	Sieb 59'; Hrgota 75'	Report	Erras 64'	Stadium: Sportpark Ronhof Thomas Sommer; Attendance: 11,008; Referee: Alexander Sather

3 February 2024 20	FC St. Pauli	3–2	Greuther Fürth	Hamburg
13:00 UTC+1	Saad 30', 81'; Afolayan 33'	Report	Sieb 44'; Asta 59'	Stadium: Millerntor-Stadion; Attendance: 29,035; Referee: Florian Exner

11 February 2024 21	Greuther Fürth	1–2	Hertha BSC	Fürth
13:30 UTC+1	Hrgota 56'	Report	Kempf 34', 63'	Stadium: Sportpark Ronhof Thomas Sommer; Attendance: 13,459; Referee: Marco Fritz

16 February 2024 22	Hannover 96	2–1	Greuther Fürth	Hanover
18:30 UTC+1	Neumann 71'; Tresoldi 90+1'	Report	Sieb 29'	Stadium: Heinz von Heiden Arena; Attendance: 31,500; Referee: Patrick Ittrich

25 February 2024 23	Greuther Fürth	2–1	1. FC Nürnberg	Fürth
13:30 UTC+1	Sieb 27', 56'	Report	Andersson 8'	Stadium: Sportpark Ronhof Thomas Sommer; Attendance: 16,126; Referee: Robert Schröder

2 March 2024 24	Karlsruher SC	4–0	Greuther Fürth	Karlsruhe
20:30 UTC+1	Matanović 42', 78'; Schleusener 86', 90'	Report		Stadium: BBBank Wildpark; Attendance: 26,043; Referee: Robin Braun

10 March 2024 25	Greuther Fürth	1–4	SV Elversberg	Fürth
13:30 UTC+1	Srbeny 61'	Report	Stock 25', 72', 82'; Martinović 87'	Stadium: Sportpark Ronhof Thomas Sommer; Attendance: 11,651; Referee: Christian Dingert

16 March 2024 26	Hansa Rostock	1–0	Greuther Fürth	Rostock
13:00 UTC+1	Neidhart 40'	Report		Stadium: Ostseestadion; Attendance: 24,500; Referee: Richard Hempel

31 March 2024 27	Greuther Fürth	1–1	Hamburger SV	Fürth
13:30 UTC+1	Consbruch 77'	Report	Muheim 56'	Stadium: Sportpark Ronhof Thomas Sommer; Attendance: 16,126; Referee: Tobias Welz

7 April 2024 28	VfL Osnabrück	2–0	Greuther Fürth	Osnabrück
13:30 UTC+2	Engelhardt 3'; Conteh 21'	Report		Stadium: Stadion an der Bremer Brücke; Attendance: 14,651; Referee: Wolfgang Haslberger

12 April 2024 29	Greuther Fürth	2–1	1. FC Kaiserslautern	Fürth
18:30 UTC+2	Wagner 54', 90+5'	Report	Ache 18'	Stadium: Sportpark Ronhof Thomas Sommer; Attendance: 15,680; Referee: Patrick Alt

20 April 2024 30	Fortuna Düsseldorf	1–0	Greuther Fürth	Düsseldorf
13:00 UTC+2	Vermeij 69'	Report		Stadium: Merkur Spiel-Arena; Attendance: 35,789; Referee: Florian Heft

28 April 2024 31	Wehen Wiesbaden	3–5	Greuther Fürth	Wiesbaden
13:30 UTC+2	Prtajin 3', 72' (pen.); Agrafiotis 18'	Report	Hrgota 26', 90+6'; Sieb 38', 43'; Petkov 84'	Stadium: Brita-Arena; Attendance: 8,012; Referee: Patrick Ittrich

4 May 2024 32	Greuther Fürth	3–3	Eintracht Braunschweig	Fürth
13:00 UTC+2	Lemperle 33'; Wagner 67'; Sieb 75'	Report	Þórir 12'; Philippe 15', 79'	Stadium: Sportpark Ronhof Thomas Sommer; Attendance: 13,241; Referee: Richard Hempel

10 May 2024 33	1. FC Magdeburg	0–0	Greuther Fürth	Magdeburg
18:30 UTC+2		Report		Stadium: MDCC-Arena; Attendance: 26,200; Referee: Tom Bauer

19 May 2024 34	Greuther Fürth	2–0	Schalke 04	Fürth
15:30 UTC+2	Hrgota 67'; Lemperle 82'	Report		Stadium: Sportpark Ronhof Thomas Sommer; Attendance: 16,126; Referee: Patrick Schwengers

=== DFB-Pokal ===
12 August 2023 First round	Hallescher FC	0–1	Greuther Fürth	Halle
18:00		Report	Sieb 18'	Stadium: Leuna Chemie Stadion; Attendance: 13,000; Referee: Florian Exner

31 October 2023 Second round	FC 08 Homburg	2–1	Greuther Fürth	Homburg
18:00	Eisele 31'; Harres 83'	Report	Hrgota 52'	Stadium: Waldstadion Homburg; Attendance: 5,230; Referee: Florian Lechner
