= Oualid Mhamdi =

Moroccan footballer (born 2003)

Personal information
- Date of birth: 20 May 2003 (age 23)
- Place of birth: Eschweiler, Germany
- Height: 1.86 m (6 ft 1 in)
- Position: Right-back

Team information
- Current team: 1. FC Heidenheim
- Number: 22

Youth career
- 2011–2012: SV Falke Bergrath
- 2012–2021: Alemannia Aachen
- 2021–2022: Viktoria Köln

Senior career*
Years	Team	Apps	(Gls)
2022	Viktoria Köln	1	(0)
2022–2025	Greuther Fürth II	18	(2)
2022–2025	Greuther Fürth	21	(0)
2025–2026	SC Verl	43	(11)
2026–	1. FC Heidenheim	6	(1)

International career^{‡}
2022	Morocco U20	5	(0)
2023	Morocco U23	2	(0)
- * Club domestic league appearances and goals as of 20 September 2026 ‡ National team caps and goals as of 16 October 2023

Oualid Mhamdi (born 20 May 2003) is a professional footballer who plays as a right-back for the German 2. Bundesliga club 1. FC Heidenheim. Born in Germany, he is a youth international for Morocco.

== Club career ==
Mhamdi is a youth product of SV Falke Bergrath, Alemannia Aachen, and Viktoria Köln. He made his professional debut as a last minute substitute with Viktoria Köln in a 2–0 loss to Borussia Dortmund II in the 3. Liga on 2 April 2022. He transferred to 2. Bundesliga side Greuther Fürth on 3 June 2022, signing a contract until 2025.

On 3 February 2025, Mhamdi signed with SC Verl in 3. Liga.

On 22 May 2026, Mhamdi signed a four-year contract with 1. FC Heidenheim.

== International career ==
Born in Germany, Mhamdi is of Moroccan descent. He played for the Morocco U20s in a set of matches in October 2022.

== Career statistics ==
As of match played 20 September 2026

Appearances and goals by club, season and competition
Club	Season	League			Cup		Europe		Other		Total	
Club	Season	Division	Apps	Goals	Apps	Goals	Apps	Goals	Apps	Goals	Apps	Goals
Viktoria Köln	2021–22	3. Liga	1	0	—		—		2 (Note: Appearances in Middle Rhine Cup)	0	3	0
Greuther Fürth II	2022–23	Regionalliga Bayern	13	0	—		—		—		13	0
Greuther Fürth II	2023–24	Regionalliga Bayern	4	2	—		—		—		4	2
Greuther Fürth II	2024–25	Regionalliga Bayern	1	0	—		—		—		1	0
Greuther Fürth II	Total		18	2	—		—		—		18	2
Greuther Fürth	2022–23	2. Bundesliga	7	0	1	0	—		—		8	0
Greuther Fürth	2023–24	2. Bundesliga	10	0	—		—		—		10	0
Greuther Fürth	2024–25	2. Bundesliga	4	0	1	0	—		—		5	0
Greuther Fürth	Total		21	0	2	0	—		—		23	0
SC Verl	2024–25	3. Liga	7	1	—		—		—		7	1
SC Verl	2025–26	3. Liga	36	10	—		—		1 (Note: Appearance in Westphalia Cup)	0	37	10
SC Verl	Total		43	11	—		—		1	0	44	11
1. FC Heidenheim	2026–27	2. Bundesliga	6	1	1	0	—		—		7	1
Career total			89	14	3	0	0	0	3	0	95	14
