= Hakan Çalhanoğlu =

Turkish footballer (born 1994)

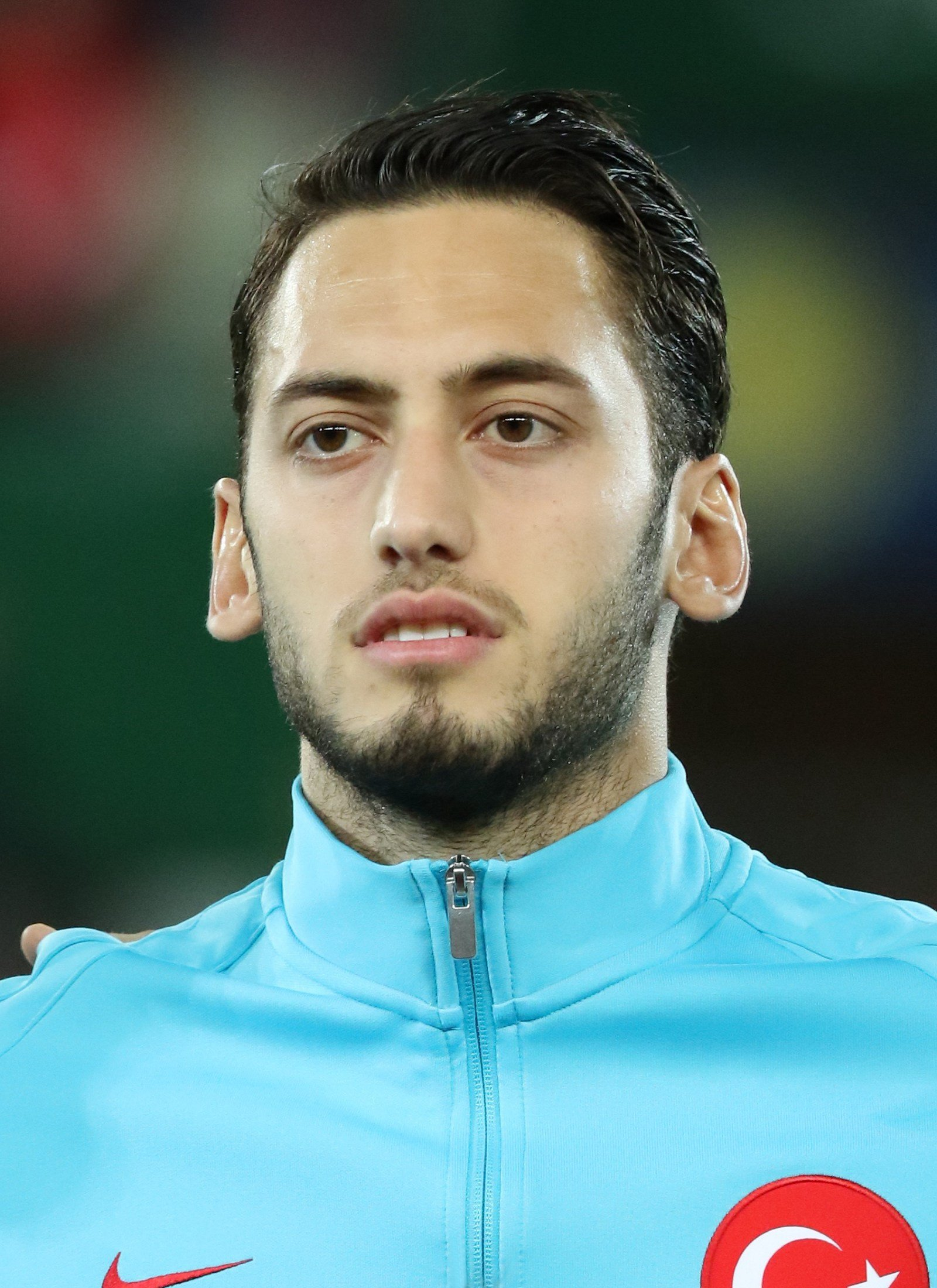
- Çalhanoğlu with Turkey in 2016

Personal information
- Date of birth: 8 February 1994 (age 32)
- Place of birth: Mannheim, Germany
- Height: 1.78 m (5 ft 10 in)
- Position: Midfielder

Team information
- Current team: Inter Milan
- Number: 20

Youth career
- 1. Turanspor Mannheim
- Polizei SV Mannheim
- 2001–2009: Waldhof Mannheim
- 2009–2011: Karlsruher SC

Senior career*
Years	Team	Apps	(Gls)
2011–2013	Karlsruher SC	50	(17)
2013–2014	Hamburger SV	32	(11)
2014–2017	Bayer Leverkusen	79	(17)
2017–2021	AC Milan	135	(22)
2021–	Inter Milan	160	(40)

International career^{‡}
2010	Turkey U16	6	(1)
2010–2011	Turkey U17	11	(1)
2011–2013	Turkey U19	15	(5)
2012–2013	Turkey U20	9	(1)
2012–2014	Turkey U21	2	(0)
2013–	Turkey	110	(22)
- * Club domestic league appearances and goals as of 21:50, 22 November 2026 (UTC) ‡ National team caps and goals as of 15 November 2026

Hakan Çalhanoğlu (Turkish pronunciation: [ˈhaːkan ˈtʃaɫhanoːɫu], born 8 February 1994) is a professional footballer who plays as a defensive midfielder for Serie A club Inter Milan. Born in Germany, he plays for and captains the Turkey national team.

Çalhanoğlu began his career at German second division club Karlsruher SC in 2010 and moved to top-flight side Hamburger SV two years later, spending another season back at his first club on loan. His performance in his first Bundesliga season earned him a €14.5 million transfer to Bayer Leverkusen in 2014. He played for three seasons there, totalling 28 goals in 115 official appearances. In 2017, Çalhanoğlu signed for AC Milan for an initial €20 million fee, before joining city rivals Inter on a free transfer in the summer of 2021.

Born in Germany, Çalhanoğlu represents Turkey at international level, from under-16 level onwards. He made his senior debut in 2013, and was part of their squad at the UEFA European Championship in 2016, 2020 and 2024, and the FIFA World Cup in 2026.

== Club career ==
=== Karlsruher SC ===
Born in Mannheim, Baden-Württemberg, Germany, Çalhanoğlu began his career with Karlsruher SC in the 2. Bundesliga in February 2012 after he was promoted from the under-19 team, although they were relegated to the 3. Liga at the end of his first season. He signed a four-year deal to join Hamburger SV in the 2012 summer transfer window, being loaned back to Karlsruhe for another season. In that season on loan, he helped the team win the third division and return to the second tier.

=== Hamburger SV ===
Çalhanoğlu made his Hamburg and Bundesliga debut on 11 August 2013, as the team opened the season with a 3–3 away draw at Schalke 04. He started the match, and was replaced by Dennis Aogo after 74 minutes. He scored his first goals for the club on 31 August, in a 4–0 home win over Eintracht Braunschweig; after replacing goalscorer Rafael van der Vaart in the 79th minute, he scored a minute later and then netted again with a free kick.

On 5 February 2014, Çalhanoğlu signed a two-year extension to his Hamburg contract, to keep him at the club until 2018. On 20 February, he scored a 41-yard free kick, against Borussia Dortmund in a 3–0 win, which ended Hamburg's bad run. As he saw no defensive wall or teammates to pass, he struck a shot that swerved viciously to find the back of the net. A delighted Çalhanoğlu said afterwards: 'I hit the free-kick the same way I do in training all the time. I'm delighted that I pulled it off!'. He was sent off for the first time in his career on 22 March, for his second booking in the 53rd minute of a 1–0 defeat away to VfB Stuttgart.

In his only full season at Hamburg, the team finished in 16th, and won a play-off against Greuther Fürth on away goals to maintain their honour as the only team to feature in every season of the top flight.

=== Bayer Leverkusen ===
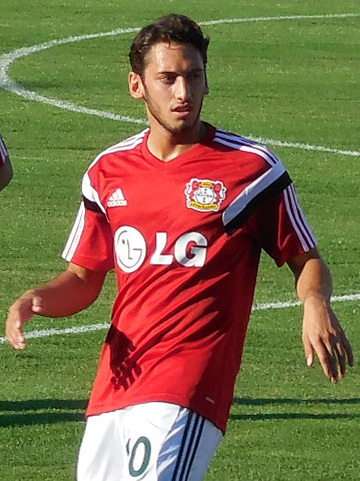
Çalhanoğlu warming up with Leverkusen before a friendly in July 2014

Hamburg were initially unwilling to sell Çalhanoğlu to other German teams, but their purchase of Pierre-Michel Lasogga from Hertha Berlin made such an exception no longer financially viable. On 4 July 2014, he left Hamburg for league rivals Bayer Leverkusen, signing a five-year contract for a transfer fee of €14.5 million. His actions leading up to the transfer caused some controversy, including taking sick leave from Hamburg; he justified the leave by saying that he was stressed by aggression from fans, including vandalism of his car. He also criticised Hamburg's director Oliver Kreuzer, accusing him of betrayal. The move was later criticised by Son Heung-min, as a response to Çalhanoğlu calling his former Leverkusen teammate's transfer to Tottenham Hotspur "badly advised".

He made his debut for the club on 19 June, starting in a 3–2 away win at Copenhagen in the first leg of a UEFA Champions League qualification play-off. Four days later, he played his first league game for his new club, a 2–0 win away to Borussia Dortmund on the opening day of the new season. On 27 August he scored his first Leverkusen goal, netting his team's second in a 4–0 win in the second leg of their European play-off. He scored his first league goal for the club on 12 September, Leverkusen's second in a 3–3 home draw against Werder Bremen. It was the first game in any competition that season which they did not win. Çalhanoğlu was nominated for the 2014 Golden Boy Award in October.

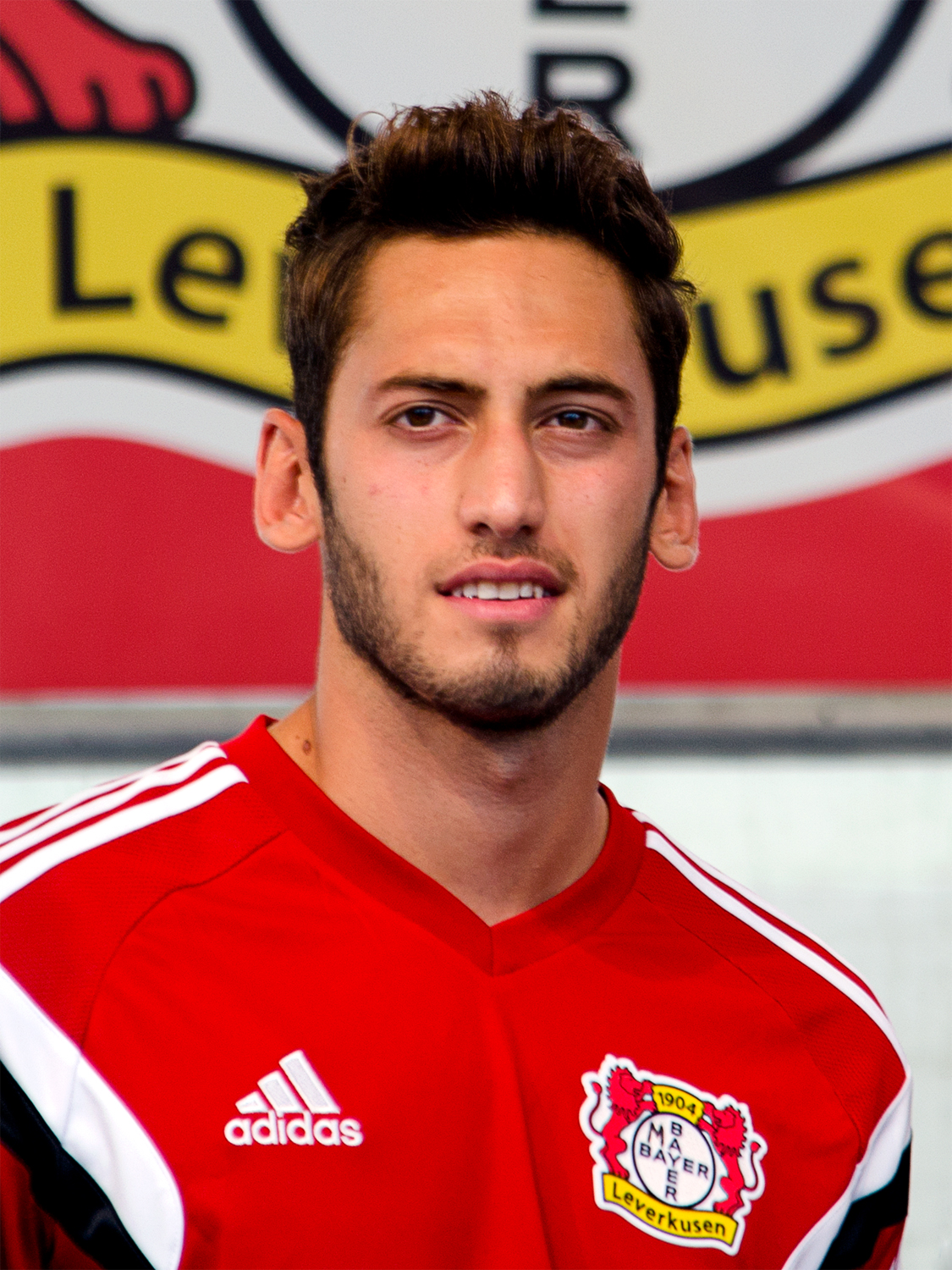
Çalhanoğlu with Leverkusen in 2015

On 25 February 2015, he scored the only goal as Leverkusen defeated Atlético Madrid in the last 16 first leg in the Champions League. However, three weeks later in the second leg, he took their first attempt in a penalty shoot-out and had it saved by Jan Oblak, as Atlético went on to win. On 2 May, Çalhanoğlu opened a 2–0 home win over newly crowned league champions Bayern Munich, with a free kick.

He opened his second season at the club by scoring a penalty on 8 August in a 3–0 win at fourth-tier Sportfreunde Lotte in the first round of the DFB-Pokal. Two weeks later, with a free kick, he scored the only goal of a league win at Hannover 96. On 26 August, he opened a 3–0 win over Lazio as Bayer came back from a first-leg deficit to qualify for the group stage of the Champions League. In their first game of the group stage, Çalhanoğlu scored twice — including a penalty earned by a handball of his free kick — in a 4–1 home rout of BATE Borisov.

He opened his 2016–17 goalscoring account on 14 September in the 2–2 home draw against CSKA Moscow in a Champions League group stage game — the 50th goal in his senior club career.

On 2 February 2017, Çalhanoğlu received a four-month ban from FIFA for a breach of contract relating to his time at Karlsruher SC. He received €100,000 from Turkish club Trabzonspor in 2011 after agreeing to sign with the club but later extended his contract with Karlsruhe. Trabzonspor had initially sought repayment of the €100,000 paid as well compensation of €1 million but FIFA ruled that €100,000 and a four-month ban would suffice.

=== AC Milan ===
On 3 July 2017, Çalhanoğlu signed a four-year contract with Serie A club AC Milan. The fee was reported as an initial €20 million, rising to €24 million. He was assigned the club's prestigious number 10 jersey, previously owned by the likes of Gianni Rivera, Ruud Gullit, Dejan Savićević, Zvonimir Boban, Rui Costa, Clarence Seedorf and Keisuke Honda.

He made his Rossoneri competitive debut a month later in the second leg of the Europa League third qualifying round, replacing Suso for the final 25 minutes of a 2–0 win (3–0 aggregate) over Universitatea Craiova at the San Siro. He scored his first goal for Milan in a 5–1 away win against Austria Wien in the group stage on 14 September, also providing two assists. Domestically, Çalhanoğlu made his league debut on 20 August, playing the full 90 minutes of a 3–0 win at Crotone. He was sent off in a 2–0 home loss to Roma on 1 October, earning a second yellow card for a foul on Radja Nainggolan. Çalhanoğlu scored his first league goal on 25 October in a 4–1 win at Chievo, becoming the first Turk to net in Serie A since Emre Belözoğlu in 2003.

=== Inter Milan ===
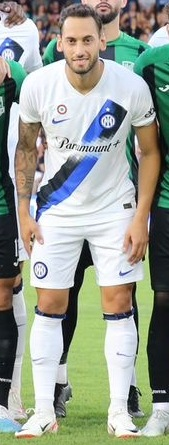
Çalhanoğlu with Internazionale in 2023

On 22 June 2021, Çalhanoğlu signed a three-year contract with Serie A club Inter Milan, the city-rival of his previous club, on a free transfer.

Çalhanoğlu scored and assisted a goal on his Inter Milan debut, a 4–0 win over Genoa on the opening day of the 2021–22 Serie A season. He went on to score seven goals and notch twelve assists in the league, and scored in the Coppa Italia final victory against Juventus, but it was his former team Milan that went on to lift the league title. On 4 October 2022, he scored his first Champions League goal with Inter in a 1–0 win over Barcelona.

On 14 March 2023, he was named Player of the Match in the Champions League round of 16 second leg away match against Porto, which ended in a goalless draw and qualification to the quarter-final for the first time in twelve years for Inter Milan, by winning 1–0 on aggregate.

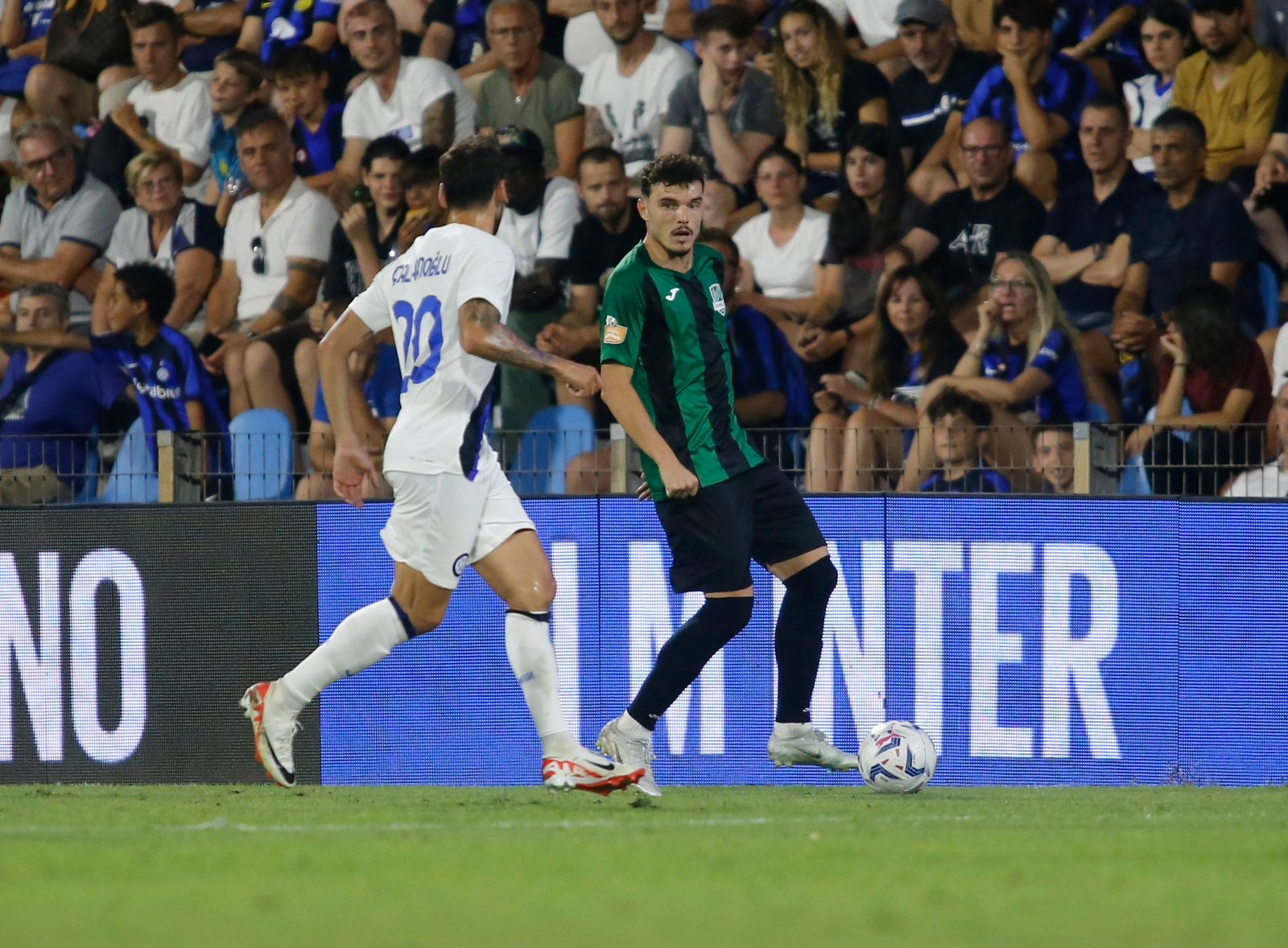
Çalhanoğlu (left) playing with Internazionale in a friendly in August 2023

On 5 June 2023, he agreed to extend his contract with Inter Milan for another 4 years, lasting until 2027. On 4 November 2023, he scored his tenth consecutive penalty in a 2–1 away victory over Atalanta, only fewer than Romelu Lukaku with 14; in addition, he managed to equal Sükrü Gülesin's record as the highest Turkish scorer in Serie A with 36 goals. He finished the 2023–24 season with a personal best, scoring 13 goals in Serie A.

In the 2024–25 season, he scored four goals during the Champions League campaign, including a penalty against Barcelona in the semifinal, helping his club advance to the final and becoming the first Turkish player to achieve this feat twice.

== International career ==
It's thanks to the Germans that I became a footballer. But playing for the Turkish national team is an honour. I want to be Turkey's Mesut Özil.

— Çalhanoğlu explaining his decision to represent Turkey to Milliyet.

Born in Germany, Çalhanoğlu opted to play for Turkey, qualifying for them through his family's origins in Trabzon. He played for the country at youth international level, including the 2013 FIFA U-20 World Cup on home soil. Turkey reached the last 16 before elimination by France. In their second group game on 28 June, Çalhanoğlu scored Turkey's equaliser in a 2–1 win over Australia at the Hüseyin Avni Aker Stadium in his ancestral city.

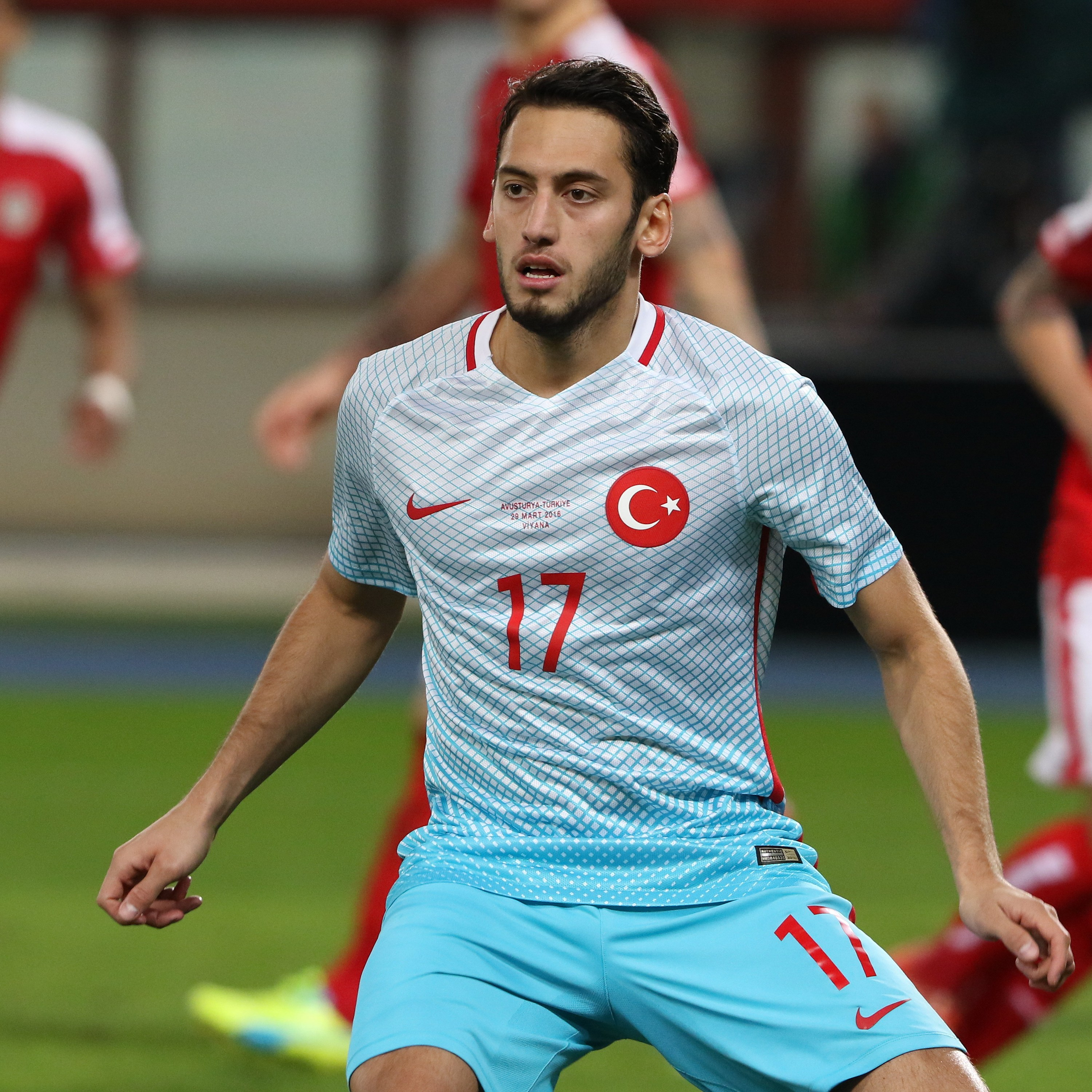
Çalhanoğlu playing for Turkey in 2016

He made his senior international debut on 6 September 2013 in a World Cup qualifier in Kayseri, replacing Gökhan Töre for the last eight minutes of a 5–0 win against Andorra in Fatih Terim's first match back in charge. He made his first start on 25 May 2014 in a 2–1 friendly win against the Republic of Ireland at Dublin's Aviva Stadium, making way for Olcan Adın after 61 minutes.

Çalhanoğlu was sharing a hotel room with national team defender Ömer Toprak in October 2013 after a World Cup qualifying defeat to the Netherlands, when Gökhan Töre and an unknown armed friend entered the room, and threatened both roommates at gunpoint, ostensibly due to Töre's ex-girlfriend dating a friend of Toprak. The incident was hidden from Turkish media, but Çalhanoğlu revealed it to Germany's ZDF television channel. Töre did not return to the national team until October 2014, when both Çalhanoğlu and Toprak were injured. The following month, with both players back to fitness and form, both were left out by Terim for a friendly against Brazil and a UEFA Euro 2016 qualifying match against Kazakhstan while Töre remained. Çalhanoğlu questioned his omission from the team, while Terim defended his own decision and said that Töre deserved to be forgiven. In June 2015, Çalhanoğlu and Töre reconciled.

On 31 March 2015, Çalhanoğlu scored his first international goal in a 2–1 friendly win away to Luxembourg, a 30-yard strike with three minutes remaining. He scored two more in a 4–0 home friendly win over Bulgaria on 8 June, the latter being a free kick. His first competitive goal came on 10 October, a cross which secured a 2–0 away win over the Czech Republic in the UEFA Euro 2016 qualifying event.

Çalhanoğlu became the first Turk to score against England, in the 11th match between the two nations, a friendly at the City of Manchester Stadium on 22 May 2016, in which he equalized in the 2–1 defeat. Later that month, on 31 May, he was selected in the 23-man squad for the UEFA Euro 2016.

On 22 March 2019, Çalhanoğlu scored the second goal of Turkey's 2–0 victory over Albania in their opening UEFA Euro 2020 qualifier. On 1 June 2021, he was named in the Turkish squad for the postponed UEFA Euro 2020. In March 2022, he became his nation's captain, following the retirement of Burak Yılmaz.

On 7 June 2024, Çalhanoğlu was called up to the 26-man squad for the UEFA Euro 2024, becoming the second Turkish player to feature in three European tournaments, following Rüştü Reçber. On 26 June, he recorded his first ever goal in the competition, scoring the opener from long range in a 2–1 win against the Czech Republic. On 11 October 2025, Çalhanoğlu made his 100th international appearance in a 6–1 away win over Bulgaria during 2026 FIFA World Cup qualification.

On 2 June 2026, Çalhanoğlu was selected in the 26-man squad for the 2026 FIFA World Cup, Turkey's first appearance at the tournament since 2002. He played the full 90 minutes of Turkey's opening two group stage matches; however, his side would lose on both occasions and see themselves eliminated from the competition.

== Style of play ==
Çalhanoğlu has been likened to Mesut Özil, another German-born midfielder of Turkish ancestry. He expressed a desire to be the equivalent of Özil in the Turkey national team.

A set-piece specialist, he is known for scoring from free kicks, and models his set-piece technique on the knuckleball free kicks of Cristiano Ronaldo and especially Juninho Pernambucano. In addition to his ability to score with power and accuracy from direct free kicks with his right foot, he is also known for his ability to bend the ball, and his set-piece delivery. In December 2013, Talksport called him "a playmaker destined for the top", praising his dedication and passing ability. Former England international Owen Hargreaves said on BT Sport in August 2015 that Çalhanoğlu's style of play would fit Liverpool or Tottenham Hotspur.

Despite mostly positive reception in his late teens and early twenties, in recent years, however, he has drawn some criticism as well; his pace was deemed insufficient for a winger, a position he adopted due to absence of his natural classic "number 10" attacking midfield role in the preferred formations of his teams, particularly AC Milan. He has also been criticized in the media for his lack of physical attributes and overall inconsistency of his performances. However, his dribbling, technique, passing (both short and long), crossing, and vision, as well as his eye for goal and striking ability from distance, have been referred to as his strengths. Çalhanoğlu has also been used in deeper midfield positions throughout his career, including in a holding role, in which he usually operates as a deep-lying playmaker, as an offensive–minded central midfielder, known as the mezzala role in Italian football jargon, or even in more offensive roles on occasion, as a second striker, for example.

== Personal life ==
Çalhanoğlu was born in Mannheim, Germany, to Turkish parents originally from Bayburt, Turkey. Çalhanoğlu married his childhood sweetheart Sinem Gündoğdu, in Mannheim, in 2017. The couple had alleged marital problems, because of which Çalhanoğlu decided to file for divorce, but in 2018, the couple reportedly made up. The couple welcomed their daughter, Liya, born in Mannheim, in March 2019. They also have two boys, Ayaz and Asil Can (born November 2023).

Muhammed, younger brother of Hakan, is also a professional footballer. The younger Çalhanoğlu was also formed at Waldhof Mannheim and Karlsruher SC, and went on to play in the lower divisions of Austrian and Turkish football. Similarly, his cousin Kerim Çalhanoğlu is also a footballer, and also played for Waldhof Mannheim.

In January 2017, Çalhanoğlu posted a video to Twitter supporting Turkish president Recep Tayyip Erdoğan ahead of the 2017 Turkish constitutional referendum. Bayer Leverkusen spokesman Dirk Mesch confirmed the club discussed the tweet with Çalhanoğlu.

On 11 October 2019, following Cenk Tosun's goal in a 1–0 home win over Albania in a Euro 2020 qualifier, Çalhanoğlu was one of the Turkish players who participated in a "military salute" goal celebration. That same day, he stated his open support for the Turkish offensive into north-eastern Syria with a post on Twitter, which drew criticism from numerous Italian football fans on social media.

He is a supporter of Galatasaray and in an interview he expressed his desire to play there in the future for a part of his career as he spent his childhood dreaming of winning trophies with Galatasaray.

== Charity ==
In 2025, Çalhanoğlu partnered with the Web3 game My Lovely Planet to launch the “Çalhanoğlu Forest” reforestation project in Kuşadası, Turkey. The initiative began with the planting of 10,000 native trees on land damaged by wildfires in 2024.

== Career statistics ==
=== Club ===
As of match played 22 November 2026

Appearances and goals by club, season and competition
Club	Season	League			National cup (Note: Includes DFB-Pokal, Coppa Italia)		Europe		Other		Total	
Club	Season	Division	Apps	Goals	Apps	Goals	Apps	Goals	Apps	Goals	Apps	Goals
Karlsruher SC	2011–12	2. Bundesliga	14	0	—		—		2 (Note: Appearances in 2. Bundesliga relegation play-offs)	0	16	0
Karlsruher SC	2012–13	3. Liga	36	17	3	0	—		—		39	17
Karlsruher SC	Total		50	17	3	0	—		2	0	55	17
Hamburger SV	2013–14	Bundesliga	32	11	4	0	—		2 (Note: Appearances in Bundesliga relegation play-offs)	0	38	11
Bayer Leverkusen	2014–15	Bundesliga	33	8	4	2	10 (Note: Appearances in UEFA Champions League)	3	—		47	13
Bayer Leverkusen	2015–16	Bundesliga	31	3	3	1	12 (Note: Eight appearances and three goals in UEFA Champions League, four appearances and one goal in UEFA Europa League)	4	—		46	8
Bayer Leverkusen	2016–17	Bundesliga	15	6	1	0	6	1	—		22	7
Bayer Leverkusen	Total		79	17	8	3	28	8	—		115	28
AC Milan	2017–18	Serie A	31	6	4	0	10 (Note: Appearances in UEFA Europa League)	2	—		45	8
AC Milan	2018–19	Serie A	36	3	4	0	5	1	1 (Note: Appearance(s) in Supercoppa Italiana)	0	46	4
AC Milan	2019–20	Serie A	35	9	3	2	—		—		38	11
AC Milan	2020–21	Serie A	33	4	1	0	9	5	—		43	9
AC Milan	Total		135	22	12	2	24	8	1	0	172	32
Inter Milan	2021–22	Serie A	34	7	5	1	6	0	1	0	46	8
Inter Milan	2022–23	Serie A	33	3	3	0	12	1	1	0	49	4
Inter Milan	2023–24	Serie A	32	13	0	0	6	1	2	1	40	15
Inter Milan	2024–25	Serie A	29	5	4	2	12	4	2	0	47	11
Inter Milan	2025–26	Serie A	22	9	2	2	6	1	0	0	30	12
Inter Milan	2026–27	Serie A	10	3	0	0	4	0	0	0	14	3
Inter Milan	Total		160	40	14	5	46	7	6	1	226	53
Career total			455	107	41	10	98	23	11	1	606	141

=== International ===
As of match played 15 November 2026

Appearances and goals by national team and year
National team	Year	Apps	Goals
Turkey	2013	1	0
Turkey	2014	4	0
Turkey	2015	10	4
Turkey	2016	11 (Note: Two appearances in UEFA Euro 2016)	4
Turkey	2017	5	0
Turkey	2018	7	1
Turkey	2019	9	1
Turkey	2020	5	1
Turkey	2021	14 (Note: Three appearances in UEFA Euro 2020)	3
Turkey	2022	8	3
Turkey	2023	9	0
Turkey	2024	12 (Note: Four appearances and one goal in UEFA Euro 2024)	3
Turkey	2025	7	2
Turkey	2026	8 (Note: Two appearances in 2026 FIFA World Cup)	0
Total		110	22

As of match played 15 November 2025. Turkey score listed first, score column indicates score after each Çalhanoğlu goal.

List of international goals scored by Hakan Çalhanoğlu
No.	Date	Venue	Cap	Opponent	Score	Result	Competition
1	31 March 2015	Stade Josy Barthel, Luxembourg City, Luxembourg	7	Luxembourg	2–1	2–1	Friendly
2	8 June 2015	Recep Tayyip Erdoğan Stadium, Kasımpaşa, Turkey	8	Bulgaria	1–0	4–0	Friendly
3	8 June 2015	Recep Tayyip Erdoğan Stadium, Kasımpaşa, Turkey	8	Bulgaria	2–0	4–0	Friendly
4	10 October 2015	Generali Arena, Prague, Czech Republic	12	Czech Republic	2–0	2–0	UEFA Euro 2016 qualifying
5	29 March 2016	Ernst-Happel-Stadion, Vienna, Austria	16	Austria	1–1	2–1	Friendly
6	22 May 2016	City of Manchester Stadium, Manchester, England	17	England	1–1	1–2	Friendly
7	5 September 2016	Stadion Maksimir, Zagreb, Croatia	23	Croatia	1–1	1–1	2018 FIFA World Cup qualification
8	6 October 2016	Konya Metropolitan Municipality Stadium, Konya, Turkey	24	Ukraine	2–2	2–2	2018 FIFA World Cup qualification
9	10 September 2018	Friends Arena, Solna, Sweden	35	Sweden	1–2	3–2	2018–19 UEFA Nations League B
10	22 March 2019	Loro Boriçi Stadium, Shkodër, Albania	39	Albania	2–0	2–0	UEFA Euro 2020 qualifying
11	14 October 2020	Türk Telekom Stadium, Istanbul, Turkey	50	Serbia	1–2	2–2	2020–21 UEFA Nations League B
12	24 March 2021	Atatürk Olympic Stadium, Istanbul, Turkey	53	Netherlands	3–0	4–2	2022 FIFA World Cup qualification
13	30 March 2021	Atatürk Olympic Stadium, Istanbul, Turkey	55	Latvia	2–0	3–3	2022 FIFA World Cup qualification
14	4 September 2021	Victoria Stadium, Gibraltar	61	Gibraltar	2–0	3–0	2022 FIFA World Cup qualification
15	11 June 2022	Stade de Luxembourg, Luxembourg City, Luxembourg	71	Luxembourg	1–0	2–0	2022–23 UEFA Nations League C
16	14 June 2022	Gürsel Aksel Stadium, İzmir, Turkey	72	Lithuania	2–0	2–0	2022–23 UEFA Nations League C
17	19 November 2022	Gaziantep Stadium, Gaziantep, Turkey	74	Czech Republic	2–1	2–1	Friendly
18	26 March 2024	Ernst-Happel-Stadion, Vienna, Austria	84	Austria	1–1	1–6	Friendly
19	26 June 2024	Volksparkstadion, Hamburg, Germany	89	Czech Republic	1–0	2–1	UEFA Euro 2024
20	15 October 2024	Laugardalsvöllur, Reykjavík, Iceland	94	Iceland	2–1	4–2	2024–25 UEFA Nations League B
21	23 March 2025	Puskás Aréna, Budapest, Hungary	97	Hungary	1–0	3–0	2024–25 UEFA Nations League promotion/relegation play-offs
22	15 November 2025	Centennial Atatürk Stadium, Bursa, Turkey	102	Bulgaria	1–0	2–0	2026 FIFA World Cup qualification

== Honours ==
Karlsruher SC

- 3. Liga: 2012–13

Inter Milan

- Serie A: 2023–24, 2025–26
- Coppa Italia: 2021–22, 2022–23, 2025–26
- Supercoppa Italiana: 2021, 2022, 2023
- UEFA Champions League runner-up: 2022–23, 2024–25

Individual

- 3. Liga Player of the Season: 2012–13
- Turkish Footballer of the Year: 2021
- Serie A Player of the Month: December 2020, November 2021
- Serie A Goal of the Month: April 2026, August–September 2026
- Serie A Team of the Year: 2022–23, 2023–24, 2025–26
- EA Sports FC Serie A Team of the Season: 2023–24
- Serie A Best Midfielder: 2023–24

== See also ==
- List of men's footballers with 100 or more international caps
