= Damian Michalski =

Polish footballer

Personal information
- Date of birth: 17 May 1998 (age 28)
- Place of birth: Bełchatów, Poland
- Height: 1.90 m (6 ft 3 in)
- Position: Centre-back

Team information
- Current team: Zagłębie Lubin
- Number: 4

Youth career
- –2016: GKS Bełchatów

Senior career*
Years	Team	Apps	(Gls)
2016–2019	GKS Bełchatów	38	(6)
2017	→ KS Polkowice (loan)	16	(0)
2019–2022	Wisła Płock	77	(7)
2022–2025	Greuther Fürth	64	(8)
2025–	Zagłębie Lubin	40	(4)
- * Club domestic league appearances and goals as of 11:26, 16 September 2026 (UTC)

Damian Michalski (born 17 May 1998) is a Polish professional footballer who plays as a centre-back for Ekstraklasa club Zagłębie Lubin.

== Career ==
On 29 August 2022, he was announced to be joining 2. Bundesliga club Greuther Fürth on a three-year contract, with an extension option.

On 3 February 2025, Michalski signed a two-and-a-half-year deal with Polish club Zagłębie Lubin.

== Career statistics ==
As of match played 23 May 2026

Appearances and goals by club, season and competition
Club	Season	League			National cup (Note: Includes Polish Cup, DFB-Pokal)		Other		Total	
Club	Season	Division	Apps	Goals	Apps	Goals	Apps	Goals	Apps	Goals
GKS Bełchatów	2015–16	I liga	1	0	0	0	—		1	0
GKS Bełchatów	2017–18	II liga	6	0	0	0	—		6	0
GKS Bełchatów	2018–19	II liga	31	6	2	0	—		33	6
GKS Bełchatów	Total		38	6	2	0	0	0	40	6
KS Polkowice (loan)	2017–18	III liga, gr. III	16	0	—		—		16	0
Wisła Płock	2019–20	Ekstraklasa	30	4	0	0	—		30	4
Wisła Płock	2020–21	Ekstraklasa	13	2	1	0	—		14	2
Wisła Płock	2021–22	Ekstraklasa	28	1	1	0	—		29	1
Wisła Płock	2022–23	Ekstraklasa	6	0	—		—		6	0
Wisła Płock	Total		77	7	2	0	0	0	79	7
Greuther Fürth	2022–23	2. Bundesliga	23	4	0	0	—		23	4
Greuther Fürth	2023–24	2. Bundesliga	29	3	2	0	—		31	3
Greuther Fürth	2024–25	2. Bundesliga	12	1	1	0	—		13	1
Greuther Fürth	Total		64	8	3	0	0	0	67	8
Zagłębie Lubin	2024–25	Ekstraklasa	9	1	—		—		9	1
Zagłębie Lubin	2025–26	Ekstraklasa	23	2	2	0	—		25	2
Zagłębie Lubin	Total		32	3	2	0	—		34	3
Career total			227	24	9	0	0	0	236	24

== Honours ==
KS Polkowice

- Polish Cup (Legnica regionals): 2017–18
