= Muhammed Çalhanoğlu =

Turkish footballer

Personal information
- Date of birth: 19 April 1995 (age 31)
- Place of birth: Mannheim, Germany
- Height: 1.70 m (5 ft 7 in)
- Position: Midfielder

Youth career
- 1. FC Turanspor Mannheim
- –2009: Waldhof Mannheim
- 2009–2014: Karlsruher SC

Senior career*
Years	Team	Apps	(Gls)
2014–2015	Karlsruher SC II	8	(2)
2015–2016	Austria Klagenfurt	10	(0)
2016–2017	Gümüşhanespor	14	(0)
2017	Fatih Karagümrük	1	(0)
2017–2018	Bayburt İdarespor	5	(0)
2018–2020	TSG Weinheim	30	(12)

International career
2011	Turkey U16	3	(0)
- * Club domestic league appearances and goals as of 19:02, 25 December 2020 (UTC)

Muhammed Çalhanoğlu (born 19 April 1995) is a Turkish-German footballer who plays as a midfielder.

== Personal life ==
He is the younger brother of fellow footballer Hakan Çalhanoğlu, and the cousin of Kerim Çalhanoğlu.
