= Kerim Çalhanoğlu =

German footballer (born 2002)

Personal information
- Date of birth: 26 August 2002 (age 24)
- Place of birth: Mannheim, Germany
- Height: 1.83 m (6 ft 0 in)
- Position: Left-back

Team information
- Current team: Gaziantep
- Number: 23

Youth career
- 2006–2014: SC Pfingstberg-Hochstätt
- 2014–2015: VfL Neckarau
- 2015–2016: Waldhof Mannheim
- 2016–2020: TSG Hoffenheim
- 2020: Schalke 04

Senior career*
Years	Team	Apps	(Gls)
2020–2023	Schalke 04	17	(0)
2021–2022	Schalke 04 II	22	(2)
2023	→ SV Sandhausen (loan)	8	(0)
2023–2025	Greuther Fürth	11	(0)
2023–2025	Greuther Fürth II	9	(1)
2025–2026	Vukovar 1991	22	(1)
2026–	Gaziantep	5	(0)

International career^{‡}
2017	Turkey U16	3	(0)
2018	Germany U16	1	(0)
2018–2019	Germany U17	13	(1)
2020	Germany U19	2	(0)
2022–2023	Germany U20	8	(1)
- * Club domestic league appearances and goals as of 11 October 2026 ‡ National team caps and goals as of 28 March 2023

Kerim Çalhanoğlu (born 26 August 2002) is a German professional footballer who plays as a left-back for Turkish Süper Lig club Gaziantep.

== Club career ==
Çalhanoğlu began his youth career at SC Pfingstberg-Hochstätt and VfL Neckarau, before joining Waldhof Mannheim in 2015. A year later, he moved to the youth academy of TSG Hoffenheim. In mid-2020, he joined the under-19 team of Schalke 04, before signing a professional contract with the club in September 2020, lasting until 2024. He made his professional debut for Schalke in the Bundesliga on 5 March 2021, starting in the home match against Mainz 05.

On 10 December 2022, he joined on loan 2. Bundesliga club SV Sandhausen for the second half of the season.

On 13 June 2023, he agreed to join Greuther Fürth.

== International career ==
Çalhanoğlu began his youth international career with Turkey, appearing in three matches for the under-16 team in 2017. He switched to represent Germany the following year, appearing for the under-16 and under-17 teams. In 2019, he was included in Germany's squad for the 2019 UEFA European Under-17 Championship in the Republic of Ireland. He played in all three of Germany's matches at the tournament, in which the team was eliminated in the group stage. In 2020, Çalhanoğlu debuted for the Germany under-19 team, appearing in two matches.

== Personal life ==
Çalhanoğlu was born in Mannheim, Baden-Württemberg, and is of Turkish descent. His younger brother, Turan Çalhanoğlu, is also a footballer, having played for the Germany youth national teams, as well as alongside Kerim at the youth teams of SC Pfingstberg-Hochstätt, VfL Neckarau, Waldhof Mannheim and 1899 Hoffenheim. Their cousins, Hakan Çalhanoğlu and Muhammed Çalhanoğlu, are also footballers, with the former having appeared for the Turkey national team and Italian club Inter Milan.

== Career statistics ==
As of 15 December 2023.

Appearances and goals by club, season and competition
Club	Season	League			Cup		Other		Total	
Club	Season	Division	Apps	Goals	Apps	Goals	Apps	Goals	Apps	Goals
Schalke 04	2020–21	Bundesliga	4	0	0	0	–		4	0
Schalke 04	2021–22	2. Bundesliga	10	0	1	0	–		11	0
Schalke 04	2022–23	Bundesliga	3	0	0	0	–		3	0
Schalke 04	Total		17	0	1	0	0	0	18	0
Schalke II	2021–22	Regionalliga West	11	0	–		–		11	0
Schalke II	2022–23	Regionalliga West	11	0	–		–		11	0
Schalke II	Total		22	0	–		–		22	0
SV Sandhausen (loan)	2022–23	2. Bundesliga	8	0	1	0	–		9	0
Greuther Fürth II	2023–24	Regionalliga Bayern	6	1	–		–		6	1
Greuther Fürth	2023–24	2. Bundesliga	5	0	0	0	–		5	0
Career total			58	1	2	0	0	0	60	1

== Honours ==
Schalke 04

- 2. Bundesliga: 2021–22
