= Jomaine Consbruch =

German footballer

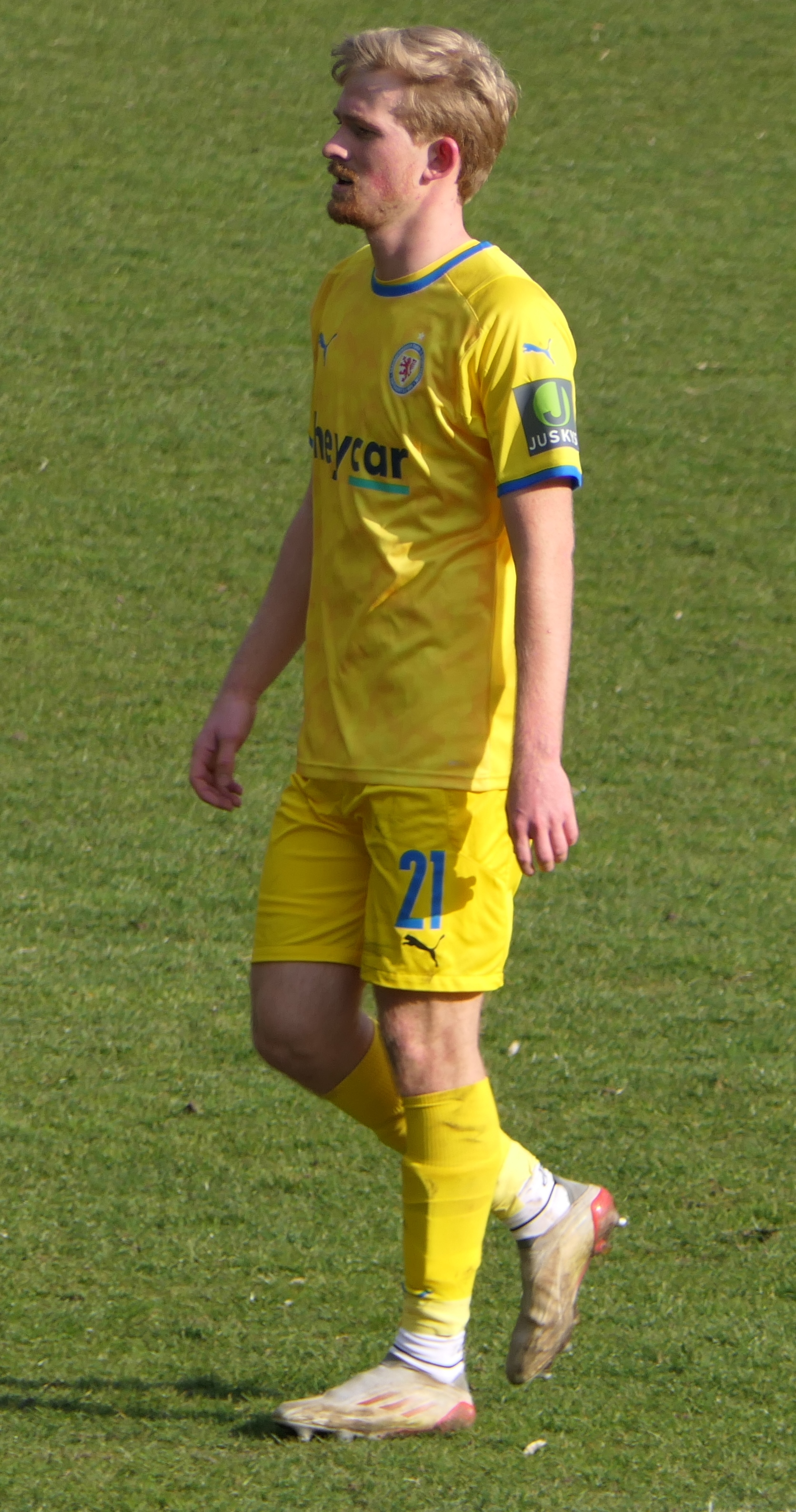

Personal information
- Full name: Jomaine Ellay Consbruch
- Date of birth: 26 January 2002 (age 24)
- Place of birth: Bielefeld, Germany
- Height: 1.74 m (5 ft 9 in)
- Position: Midfielder

Team information
- Current team: Fortuna Düsseldorf
- Number: 14

Youth career
- –2009: SV Ubbedissen
- 2009–2011: Arminia Bielefeld
- 2011–2012: SV Ubbedissen
- 2012–2019: Arminia Bielefeld

Senior career*
Years	Team	Apps	(Gls)
2019–2023	Arminia Bielefeld	22	(3)
2021–2022	→ Eintracht Braunschweig (loan)	25	(4)
2023–2026	Greuther Fürth	61	(4)
2026–	Fortuna Düsseldorf	0	(0)

International career^{‡}
2017–2018	Germany U16	6	(0)
2018–2019	Germany U17	2	(0)
- * Club domestic league appearances and goals as of 31 May 2026 ‡ National team caps and goals as of 20:38, 29 July 2019 (UTC)

Jomaine Ellay Consbruch (born 26 January 2002) is a German professional footballer who plays as a midfielder for 3. Liga club Fortuna Düsseldorf.

== Career ==
After beginning his youth career with SV Ubbedissen, Consbruch joined the youth academy of Arminia Bielefeld in 2009. He briefly returned to Ubbedissen for the 2011–12 season before again joining Bielefeld's youth team.

Consbruch made his professional debut for Bielefeld in the 2. Bundesliga on 29 July 2019, coming on as a substitute in the 86th minute for Stephan Salger in the home match against FC St. Pauli, which finished as a 1–1 draw.

On 10 June 2026, Consbruch signed a three-year contract with Fortuna Düsseldorf in 3. Liga.

== Career statistics ==
=== Club ===
As of match played 18 May 2025

Appearances and goals by club, season and competition
Club	Season	League			DFB Pokal		Other		Total	
Club	Season	Division	Apps	Goals	Apps	Goals	Apps	Goals	Apps	Goals
Arminia Bielefeld	2019–20	2. Bundesliga	1	0	0	0	—		1	0
Arminia Bielefeld	2020–21	Bundesliga	0	0	1	0	—		1	0
Arminia Bielefeld	2021–22	Bundesliga	0	0	0	0	—		0	0
Arminia Bielefeld	2022–23	2. Bundesliga	21	4	2	0	1 (Note: Appearance(s) in 2. Bundesliga Promotion/Relegation play-offs)	0	24	4
Arminia Bielefeld	Total		22	4	3	0	1	0	26	4
Eintracht Braunschweig (loan)	2021–22	3. Liga	25	4	0	0	—		25	4
Greuther Fürth	2023–24	2. Bundesliga	23	1	2	0	—		25	1
Greuther Fürth	2024–25	2. Bundesliga	21	3	1	0	—		22	3
Greuther Fürth	Total		44	4	3	0	—		47	4
Career total			91	12	6	0	1	0	98	12
