= Maximilian Dietz =

American soccer player (born 2002)

Personal information
- Full name: Maximilian Solomon Dietz
- Date of birth: February 9, 2002 (age 24)
- Place of birth: New York City, New York, U.S.
- Height: 6 ft 2 in (1.88 m)
- Positions: Defensive midfielder; centre-back

Team information
- Current team: Górnik Zabrze
- Number: 66

Youth career
- –2010: SG Bornheim GW
- 2010–2015: Eintracht Frankfurt
- 2015–2017: FSV Frankfurt
- 2017–2021: SC Freiburg

Senior career*
Years	Team	Apps	(Gls)
2021–2022	SC Freiburg II	2	(0)
2022–2023	Greuther Fürth II	25	(0)
2023–2026	Greuther Fürth	85	(0)
2026–	Górnik Zabrze	3	(0)

International career^{‡}
2019	United States U17		
2023–2024	United States U23	9	(0)
- * Club domestic league appearances and goals as of August 28, 2026 ‡ National team caps and goals as of July 31, 2024

Maximilian Solomon Dietz (/ˈdiːts/ DEETS; born February 9, 2002) is an American professional soccer player who plays as a defensive midfielder or centre-back for Ekstraklasa club Górnik Zabrze.

== International career ==
Dietz was born in the United States to a German father and American mother, and holds dual-citizenship. Having previously represented the United States at the under-17 level, Dietz was called up to the United States under-23 national team on October 8, 2023, ahead of friendlies against Mexico and Japan.
