= Simon Asta =

German footballer (born 2001)

Personal information
- Date of birth: 25 January 2001 (age 25)
- Place of birth: Augsburg, Germany
- Height: 1.78 m (5 ft 10 in)
- Position: Right-back

Team information
- Current team: 1. FC Kaiserslautern
- Number: 2

Youth career
- –2012: TSV Göggingen 1875
- 2012–2018: FC Augsburg

Senior career*
Years	Team	Apps	(Gls)
2018–2020	FC Augsburg	2	(0)
2019–2020	FC Augsburg II	4	(0)
2020–2025	Greuther Fürth	108	(4)
2025–	1. FC Kaiserslautern	15	(1)

International career^{‡}
2016	Germany U15	1	(0)
2017	Germany U16	1	(0)
2017	Germany U17	1	(0)
2018–2019	Germany U18	6	(0)
2019	Germany U19	6	(0)
2020–2021	Germany U20	7	(1)
2022–2023	Germany U21	2	(0)
- * Club domestic league appearances and goals as of 18 May 2026 ‡ National team caps and goals as of 21:28, 24 March 2023 (UTC)

Simon Asta (born 25 January 2001) is a German professional footballer who plays as a right-back for 2. Bundesliga club 1. FC Kaiserslautern.

== Career ==
On 5 October 2020, the last day of the 2020 summer transfer window, Asta joined SpVgg Greuther Fürth from FC Augsburg. He signed a two-year contract with the option of a third year.

On 23 May 2025, Asta signed with 1. FC Kaiserslautern.
