= 2021–22 1. FC Magdeburg season =

1. FC Magdeburg
2021–22 season
- Chairman: Peter Fechner
- Manager: Christian Titz
- Stadium: MDCC-Arena
- 2. Bundesliga: 1st (promoted)
- DFB-Pokal: First round
- Top goalscorer: League: Baris Atik (19); All: Baris Atik (19)
- Average home league attendance: 16,682
- Biggest win: Magdeburg 5-0 MSV Duisburg

The 2021–22 season was the 56th in the history of 1. FC Magdeburg. The club participated in the 2. Bundesliga and the DFB-Pokal.

== Players ==
=== First-team squad ===
As of 23 May 2026

Note: Flags indicate national team as defined under FIFA eligibility rules; some limited exceptions apply. Players may hold more than one non-FIFA nationality.

No.	Pos.	Nation	Player
1	GK	GER	Dominik Reimann
2	DF	KEN	Tobias Knost
4	DF	LUX	Eldin Dzogovic
5	DF	GER	Tobias Müller
6	MF	POL	Adrian Malachowski
7	FW	SUI	Luka Sloskovic
8	MF	GER	Sebastian Jakubiak
9	FW	GER	Kai Brünker
10	MF	GER	Moritz Kwarteng
12	GK	GER	Tom Schlitter
13	MF	GER	Connor Krempicki
14	FW	GER	Maximilian Franzke
15	DF	GER	Daniel Heber
16	MF	GER	Andreas Müller
17	FW	BRA	Léo Scienza

No.	Pos.	Nation	Player
18	MF	GER	Florian Kath
19	FW	GER	Leon Bell Bell
20	DF	GER	Julian Rieckmann
10	MF	GER	Jason Ceka
21	DF	GER	Tim Stappmann
22	DF	GER	Tim Sechelmann
23	MF	TUR	Barış Atik
24	DF	GER	Alexander Bittroff
25	DF	CIV	Silas Gnaka
26	DF	GER	Luca Schuler
27	DF	GER	Malcolm Cacutalua
28	GK	GER	Tim Boss
29	MF	GER	Amara Condé (captain)
30	GK	GER	Noah Kruth
31	DF	AUT	Maximilian Ullmann (on loan from Venezia)
33	DF	GER	Leon Schmökel
37	FW	JPN	Tatsuya Ito (on loan from Sint-Truiden)
39	GK	GER	Tom Schlitter

== Transfers ==
=== In ===
Pos.	Player	Transferred from	Fee	Date	Source
MF	(Germany) Dominik Reimann	(Germany) Holstein Kiel	Undisclosed	1 July 2021	

== Pre-season and friendlies ==
Win Draw Loss Fixtures

== Competitions ==
=== Overall record ===
Competition	First match	Last match	Starting round	Final position	Record							
Competition	First match	Last match	Starting round	Final position	Pld	W	D	L	GF	GA	GD	Win %
3. Liga	24 July 2021	14 May 2022	Matchday 1	1st	36	24	6	6	83	39	+44	66.67
DFB-Pokal	7 August 2021		First round	First round	1	0	0	1	2	3	−1	0.00
Total					37	24	6	7	85	42	+43	64.86

Last updated: May 2026
Source: Soccerway

=== 3. Liga ===
==== League table ====
Pos	Team	Pld	W	D	L	GF	GA	GD	Pts	Promotion, qualification or relegation
1	1. FC Magdeburg (C, P)	36	24	6	6	83	39	+44	78	Promotion to 2. Bundesliga and qualification for DFB-Pokal
2	Eintracht Braunschweig (P)	36	18	10	8	61	36	+25	64	Promotion to 2. Bundesliga and qualification for DFB-Pokal
3	1. FC Kaiserslautern (O, P)	36	18	9	9	56	27	+29	63	Qualification for promotion play-offs and DFB-Pokal
4	1860 Munich	36	17	10	9	67	50	+17	61	Qualification for DFB-Pokal
5	Waldhof Mannheim	36	16	12	8	58	40	+18	60	

Source: DFB
Rules for classification: 1) Points; 2) Goal difference; 3) Goals scored; 4) Head-to-head results; 5) Head-to-head away goals scored; 6) Away goals scored; 7) Play-off.
(C) Champions; (O) Play-off winners; (P) Promoted

==== Results by round ====
Round	1	2	3	4	5	6	7	8	9	10	11	12	13	14	15	16	17	18	19	20	21	22	23	24	25	26	27	28	29	30	31	32	33	34	35	36	37	38
Ground	A	H	A	H	A	A	H	A	H	A	H	A	H	A	H	A	H	A	H	H	A	H	A	H	H	A	H	A	H	A	H	A	H	A	H	A	H	A
Result	W	D	W	W	L	W	W	W	L	L	W	W	W	L	W	D	W	W	W	W	W	D	W	W	W	D	W	W	D	L	D	L	W	W	W	L	W	W
Position	2	4	3	1	3	2	1	1	1	1	1	1	1	1	1	1	1	1	1	1	1	1	1	1	1	1	1	1	1	1	1	1	1	1	1	1	1	1

Updated to match(es) played on 12 May 2023. Source: DFB

==== Matches ====
 The league fixtures were announced on 17 June 2021.
A = Away; H = Home; W = Win; D = Draw; L = Loss

24 July 2021 1	Waldhof Mannheim	0–2	1. FC Magdeburg	Mannheim
14:00 CEST (UTC+2)		Report		Stadium: Carl-Benz-Stadion; Attendance: 7,568; Referee: Florian Heft

31 July 2021 2	1. FC Magdeburg	0–0	SC Freiburg II	Magdeburg
14:00 CEST (UTC+2)		Report		Stadium: MDCC-Arena; Attendance: 13,644; Referee: Tom Bauer

14 August 2021 3	TSV Havelse	1–3	1. FC Magdeburg	Hannover
14:00 CEST (UTC+2)		Report		Stadium: Niedersachsenstadion; Attendance: 3,139; Referee: Robin Braun

21 August 2021 4	1. FC Magdeburg	0–0	MSV Duisburg	Magdeburg
14:00 CEST (UTC+2)		Report		Stadium: MDCC-Arena; Attendance: 14,145; Referee: Patrick Schwengers

25 August 2021 5	1. FC Saarbrücken	2–1	1. FC Magdeburg	Saarbrücken
19:00 CEST (UTC+2)		Report		Stadium: Ludwigsparkstadion; Attendance: 6,400; Referee: Dr. Robert Kampka

28 August 2021 6	SV Wehen Wiesbaden	2–4	1. FC Magdeburg	Wiesbaden
14:00 CEST (UTC+2)		Report		Stadium: BRITA-Arena; Attendance: 2,168; Referee: Martin Speckner

4 September 2021 7	1. FC Magdeburg	0–0	1. FC Kaiserslautern	Magdeburg
18:00 CEST (UTC+2)		Report		Stadium: MDCC-Arena; Attendance: 15,000; Referee: Alexander Sather

11 September 2021 8	Borussia Dortmund II	0–2	1. FC Magdeburg	Dortmund
19:00 CEST (UTC+2)		Report		Stadium: Stadion Rote Erde; Attendance: 1,500; Referee: Lars Erbst

18 September 2021 9	1. FC Magdeburg	1–2	Würzburger Kickers	Magdeburg
14:00 CEST (UTC+2)		Report		Stadium: MDCC-Arena; Attendance: 15,200; Referee: Patrick Alt

24 September 2021 10	Hallescher FC	3–2	1. FC Magdeburg	Halle/Saale
19:00 CEST (UTC+2)		Report		Stadium: Kurt-Wabbel-Stadion; Attendance: 10,065; Referee: Frank Willenborg

4 October 2021 11	1. FC Magdeburg	4–0 annulled	Türkgücü München	Magdeburg
19:00 CEST (UTC+2)		Report		Stadium: MDCC-Arena; Attendance: 14,855; Referee: Eric Müller

16 October 2021 12	SV Meppen	2–3	1. FC Magdeburg	Meppen
14:00 CEST (UTC+2)		Report		Stadium: Hänsch-Arena; Attendance: 8,739; Referee: Dr. Martin Thomson

23 October 2021 13	1. FC Magdeburg	1–0	Viktoria Berlin	Magdeburg
14:00 CEST (UTC+2)		Report		Stadium: MDCC-Arena; Attendance: 20,000; Referee: Dr. Arne Aarnink

29 October 2021 14	FC Viktoria Köln	1–0	1. FC Magdeburg	Cologne
19:00 CEST (UTC+2)		Report		Stadium: Sportpark Höhenberg; Attendance: 3,711; Referee: Lukas Benen

7 November 2021 15	1. FC Magdeburg	2–0	SC Verl	Magdeburg
14:00 CEST (UTC+2)		Report		Stadium: MDCC-Arena; Attendance: 15,403; Referee: Steven Greif

27 November 2021 17	1. FC Magdeburg	2–0	Eintracht Braunschweig	Magdeburg
14:00 CEST (UTC+2)		Report		Stadium: MDCC-Arena; Attendance: 17,374; Referee: Dr. Robert Kampka

4 December 2021 18	TSV 1860 München	2–5	1. FC Magdeburg	Munich
14:00 CEST (UTC+2)		Report		Stadium: Stadion an der Grünwalder Straße; Referee: Patrick Glaser

11 December 2021 19	1. FC Magdeburg	2–1	VfL Osnabrück	Magdeburg
14:00 CEST (UTC+2)		Report		Stadium: MDCC-Arena; Attendance: 12,000; Referee: Robert Schröder

15 December 2021 16	FSV Zwickau	1–1	1. FC Magdeburg	Zwickau
19:00 CEST (UTC+2)		Report		Stadium: Stadion Zwickau; Referee: Wolfgang Haslberger

19 December 2021 20	1. FC Magdeburg	3–0	SV Waldhof Mannheim	Magdeburg
13:00 CEST (UTC+2)		Report		Stadium: MDCC-Arena; Attendance: 13,421; Referee: Lasso Koslowski

15 Januar 2022 21	SC Freiburg II	2–3	1. FC Magdeburg	Freiburg
14:00 CEST (UTC+2)		Report		Stadium: Schwarzwald-Stadion; Referee: Patrick Hanslbauer

23 January 22	1. FC Magdeburg	1–1	TSV Havelse	Magdeburg
15:00 CEST (UTC+2)		Report		Stadium: MDCC-Arena; Attendance: 13,385; Referee: Timo Gerach

26 Januar 2022 23	MSV Duisburg	0–5	1. FC Magdeburg	Duisburg
19:00 CEST (UTC+2)		Report		Stadium: Schauinsland-Reisen-Arena; Referee: Dr. Florian Exner

29 January 2022 24	1. FC Magdeburg	2–1	1. FC Saarbrücken	Magdeburg
17:55 CEST (UTC+2)		Report		Stadium: MDCC-Arena; Attendance: 14,316; Referee: Wolfgang Haslberger

5 February 2022 25	1. FC Magdeburg	3–1	SV Wehen Wiesbaden	Magdeburg
14:00 CEST (UTC+2)		Report		Stadium: MDCC-Arena; Attendance: 13,564; Referee: Dr. Arne Aarnink

12 February 2022 26	MSV Duisburg	2–2	1. FC Magdeburg	Kaiserslautern
14:00 CEST (UTC+2)		Report		Stadium: Fritz-Walter-Stadion; Attendance: 10,000; Referee: Thorben Siewer

19 February 2022 27	1. FC Magdeburg	2–0	Borussia Dortmund II	Magdeburg
14:00 CEST (UTC+2)		Report		Stadium: MDCC-Arena; Attendance: 15,000; Referee: Frank Willenborg

26 February 2022 28	Würzburger Kickers	2–4	1. FC Magdeburg	Würzburg
14:00 CEST (UTC+2)		Report		Stadium: flyeralarm Arena; Attendance: 2,137; Referee: Patrick Schwengers

5 March 2022 29	1. FC Magdeburg	1–1	Hallescher FC	Magdeburg
14:00 CEST (UTC+2)		Report		Stadium: MDCC-Arena; Attendance: 20,280; Referee: Michael Bacher

12 March 2022 30	Türkgücü München	2–1 annulled	1. FC Magdeburg	München
14:00 CEST (UTC+2)		Report		Stadium: Olympiastadion München; Attendance: 2,489; Referee: Patrick Glaser

19 March 2022 31	1. FC Magdeburg	0–0	SV Meppen	Magdeburg
14:00 CEST (UTC+2)		Report		Stadium: MDCC-Arena; Attendance: 15,607; Referee: Konrad Oldhafer

4 April 2022 32	Viktoria Berlin	2–1	1. FC Magdeburg	Berlin
19:00 CEST (UTC+2)		Report		Stadium: Friedrich-Ludwig-Jahn-Sportpark; Attendance: 4,334; Referee: Richard Hempel

9 April 2022 33	1. FC Magdeburg	4–2	Viktoria Köln	Magdeburg
14:00 CEST (UTC+2)		Report		Stadium: MDCC-Arena; Attendance: 20,005; Referee: Dr. Riem Hussein

17 April 2022 34	SC Verl	4–5	1. FC Magdeburg	Paderborn
13:00 CEST (UTC+2)		Report		Stadium: Benteler-Arena; Attendance: 2,333; Referee: Lukas Benen

24 April 2022 35	1. FC Magdeburg	3–0	FSV Zwickau	Magdeburg
14:00 CEST (UTC+2)		Report		Stadium: MDCC-Arena; Attendance: 26,340; Referee: Tom Bauer

29 April 2022 36	Eintracht Braunschweig	2–1	1. FC Magdeburg	Braunschweig
19:00 CEST (UTC+2)		Report		Stadium: Eintracht-Stadion; Attendance: 23,325; Referee: Daniel Siebert

7 May 2022 37	1. FC Magdeburg	4–0	TSV 1860 München	Magdeburg
14:00 CEST (UTC+2)		Report		Stadium: MDCC-Arena; Attendance: 24,695; Referee: Dr. Matthias Jöllenbeck

14 May 2022 38	VfL Osnabrück	1–5	1. FC Magdeburg	Osnabrück
13:30 CEST (UTC+2)		Report		Stadium: Bremer Brücke; Attendance: 15,387; Referee: Bastian Dankert

=== DFB-Pokal ===
7 August 2021 Round 1	1. FC Magdeburg	2–3	FC St. Pauli	Magdeburg
18:30				Stadium: MDCC-Arena; Attendance: 14,405; Referee: (Germany) Robert Schröder

=== Saxony-Anhalt Cup ===
15 September 2021 Last 32	1. FC Lok Stendal	0–3	1. FC Magdeburg	Stendal
17:00				Stadium: Stadion am Hölzchen; Attendance: 1,131; Referee: Michael Damke

9 October 2021 Last 16	Haldensleber SC	0–5	1. FC Magdeburg	Haldensleben
14:00				Stadium: Waldstadion; Attendance: 2,055; Referee: Patrick Menz

13 November 2021 Quarter Final	1. FC Romonta Amsdorf	0–2	1. FC Magdeburg	Amsdorf
13:00				Stadium: Sportplatz Amsdorf; Attendance: 488; Referee: Albert Lehmann

25 March 2022 Semi Final	1. FC Magdeburg	10–0	BSV Halle-Ammendorf	Magdeburg
19:00				Stadium: Avnet Arena; Attendance: 3,927; Referee: Julius Weiser

21 May 2022 Final	FC Einheit Wernigerode	0–5	1. FC Magdeburg	Halberstadt
12:15				Stadium: Friedensstadion; Attendance: 3,800; Referee: Marco Thinius
