= 2022–23 1. FC Magdeburg season =

1. FC Magdeburg
2022–23 season
- Chairman: Peter Fechner
- Manager: Christian Titz
- Stadium: MDCC-Arena
- 2. Bundesliga: 11th
- DFB-Pokal: First round
- Top goalscorer: League: Moritz Kwarteng (10); All: Moritz Kwarteng (10)
- Highest home attendance: 27,050
- Lowest home attendance: 18,300
- Average home league attendance: 22,602
- Biggest win: Magdeburg 4-0 Arminia Bielefeld
- Biggest defeat: Magdeburg 0–4 Eintracht Frankfurt; Magdeburg 0–4 Hannover 96
Home colours	Away colours	Third colours
- All statistics correct as of 18 February 2022.

The 2022–23 season is the 57th in the history of 1. FC Magdeburg and their first season back in the second division. The club will participate in the 2. Bundesliga and the DFB-Pokal.

== Players ==
=== First-team squad ===
As of 25 January 2023

Note: Flags indicate national team as defined under FIFA eligibility rules; some limited exceptions apply. Players may hold more than one non-FIFA nationality.

No.	Pos.	Nation	Player
1	GK	GER	Dominik Reimann
2	DF	ITA	Cristiano Piccini
3	FW	NED	Luc Castaignos
4	DF	LUX	Eldin Dzogovic
5	DF	GER	Jamie Lawrence (on loan from Bayern Munich II)
6	MF	LBA	Daniel Elfadli
7	DF	UGA	Herbert Bockhorn
8	MF	GER	Moritz Kwarteng
9	FW	GER	Kai Brünker
10	MF	GER	Jason Ceka
11	MF	MAR	Mohamed El Hankouri
12	DF	SYR	Belal Halbouni
13	MF	GER	Connor Krempicki
14	FW	GER	Maximilian Franzke
15	DF	GER	Daniel Heber
16	MF	GER	Andreas Müller
17	FW	BRA	Léo Scienza

No.	Pos.	Nation	Player
18	MF	GER	Florian Kath
19	FW	GER	Leon Bell Bell
20	DF	GER	Julian Rieckmann
21	DF	GER	Tim Stappmann
22	DF	GER	Tim Sechelmann
23	MF	TUR	Barış Atik
24	DF	GER	Alexander Bittroff
25	DF	CIV	Silas Gnaka
26	DF	GER	Luca Schuler
27	DF	GER	Malcolm Cacutalua
28	GK	GER	Tim Boss
29	MF	GER	Amara Condé (captain)
30	GK	GER	Noah Kruth
31	DF	AUT	Maximilian Ullmann (on loan from Venezia)
33	DF	GER	Leon Schmökel
37	FW	JPN	Tatsuya Ito (on loan from Sint-Truiden)
39	GK	GER	Tom Schlitter

== Pre-season and friendlies ==
Win Draw Loss Fixtures

22 June 2022 Friendly	1. FC Magdeburg (Germany)	2–0	(Germany) BSV Rehden
CEST (UTC+2)

25 June 2022 Friendly	1. FC Magdeburg (Germany)	2–1	(Germany) Viktoria Berlin
CEST (UTC+2)

2 July 2022 Friendly	1. FC Magdeburg (Germany)	1–4	(Germany) Union Berlin	Magdeburg
16:30 CEST (UTC+2)	Atik 33'		Voglsammer 1'; Behrens 8'; Endo 54'; Skarke 87'	Stadium: MDCC-Arena; Attendance: 7,955

9 July 2022 Friendly	1. FC Magdeburg (Germany)	4–2	(Netherlands) Cambuur
CEST (UTC+2)

21 September 2022 Friendly	1. FC Magdeburg (Germany)	4–1	(Germany) Schöningen
CEST (UTC+2)

21 December 2022 Friendly	1. FC Magdeburg (Germany)	2–3	(Germany) FSV Zwickau
TRT (UTC+3)

6 January 2023 Friendly	1. FC Magdeburg (Germany)	4–1	(Hungary) Kecskemét
TRT (UTC+3)

11 January 2023 Friendly	Zagłębie Lubin (Poland)	2–1	(Germany) 1. FC Magdeburg
TRT (UTC+3)

13 January 2023 Friendly	1. FC Magdeburg (Germany)	4–2	(Hungary) MTK Budapest
TRT (UTC+3)

20 January 2023 Friendly	Legia Warsaw (Poland)	2–2	(Germany) 1. FC Magdeburg
TRT (UTC+3)

== Competitions ==
=== Overall record ===
Competition	First match	Last match	Starting round	Final position	Record							
Competition	First match	Last match	Starting round	Final position	Pld	W	D	L	GF	GA	GD	Win %
2. Bundesliga	16 July 2022	28 May 2023	Matchday 1	11th	34	12	7	15	48	55	−7	35.29
DFB-Pokal	1 August 2022		First round	First round	1	0	0	1	0	4	−4	0.00
Total					35	12	7	16	48	59	−11	34.29

Last updated: May 2023
Source: Soccerway

=== 2. Bundesliga ===
==== League table ====
Pos	Team	Pld	W	D	L	GF	GA	GD	Pts
9	1. FC Kaiserslautern	34	11	12	11	47	48	−1	45
10	Hannover 96	34	12	8	14	50	55	−5	44
11	1. FC Magdeburg	34	12	7	15	48	55	−7	43
12	Greuther Fürth	34	10	11	13	47	50	−3	41
13	Hansa Rostock	34	12	5	17	32	48	−16	41

Source: DFB
Rules for classification: 1) Points; 2) Goal difference; 3) Goals scored; 4) Head-to-head results; 5) Head-to-head away goals scored; 6) Away goals scored; 7) Play-off.

==== Results summary ====
Overall								Home						Away					
Pld	W	D	L	GF	GA	GD	Pts	W	D	L	GF	GA	GD	W	D	L	GF	GA	GD
34	12	7	15	48	55	−7	43	6	4	7	23	22	+1	6	3	8	25	33	−8

Last updated: 28 May 2023.
Source: DFB

==== Results by round ====
Round	1	2	3	4	5	6	7	8	9	10	11	12	13	14	15	16	17	18	19	20	21	22	23	24	25	26	27	28	29	30	31	32	33	34
Ground	H	A	H	A	H	A	A	H	A	H	A	H	A	H	A	H	A	A	H	A	H	A	H	H	A	H	A	H	A	H	A	H	A	H
Result	L	W	L	L	L	D	L	W	L	W	L	L	W	D	W	L	L	L	D	W	L	W	W	D	L	W	D	L	W	W	D	D	L	W
Position	12	9	13	16	16	16	17	15	18	13	15	17	15	15	13	14	17	18	18	15	15	14	12	11	13	11	12	13	12	11	11	11	11	11

Updated to match(es) played on 12 May 2023. Source: DFB
A = Away; H = Home; W = Win; D = Draw; L = Loss

==== Matches ====
The league fixtures were announced on 17 June 2022.

16 July 2022 1	1. FC Magdeburg	1–2	Fortuna Düsseldorf	Magdeburg
13:00 CEST (UTC+2)	Krempicki 50'		Hennings 43' (pen.); Klaus 46'	Stadium: MDCC-Arena; Referee: Arne Aarnink

24 July 2022 2	Karlsruher SC	2–3	1. FC Magdeburg	Karlsruhe
13:30 CEST (UTC+2)	Wanitzek (yellow card) 37' (goal) 63'; Gondorf (yellow card) 45+3'; Kaufmann 65'	Report	Krempicki (yellow card) 3'; Müller 7'; Atik 32'; Kwarteng 34'; El Hankouri (yellow card) 70'; Tim Sechelmann (yellow card) 84'	Stadium: BBBank Wildpark; Attendance: 16,679; Referee: (Germany) Benjamin Brand

7 August 2022 3	1. FC Magdeburg	1–2	Holstein Kiel	Magdeburg
13:30 CEST (UTC+2)	Lawrence (yellow card) 34' (yellow-red card) 56'; Ceka 43'; Cacutalua (yellow card) 67'; Reimann (yellow card) 85'	Report	Komenda 17'; Porath (yellow card) 29'; Arp (yellow card) 32'; Pichler 59' (pen.); Schulz (yellow card) 80'; Mühling (yellow card) 90+3'	Stadium: MDCC-Arena; Attendance: 19,511; Referee: (Germany) Timo Gerach

14 August 2022 4	FC St. Pauli	3–0	1. FC Magdeburg	Hamburg
13:30 CEST (UTC+2)	Eggestein 3' 14'; Paqarada (yellow card) 27'; Irvine (yellow card) 31'; Matanović (yellow card) 41'; Hartel 77'	Report		Stadium: Millerntor-Stadion; Attendance: 29,164; Referee: (Germany) Florian Badstübner

19 August 2022 5	1. FC Magdeburg	0–4	Hannover 96	Magdeburg
18:30 CEST (UTC+2)	Bell Bell (yellow card) 43'; Schuler (yellow card) 53'; El Hankouri (yellow card) 67'	Report	Beier 14'; Neumann (yellow card) 36'; Kunze (yellow card) 41'; Krajnc 44' (yellow card) 79'; Köhn (yellow card) 52'; Muroya 56'; Teuchert 90+1'	Stadium: MDCC-Arena; Attendance: 23,908; Referee: (Germany) Robert Kampka

28 August 2022 6	1. FC Kaiserslautern	4–4	1. FC Magdeburg	Kaiserslautern
13:30 CEST (UTC+2)	Boyd 7'; Tomiak 40'; Hercher 47'; Wunderlich 66' (pen.); Zimmer (yellow card) 90+3'	Report	Kwarteng 11' 22'; El Hankouri 17'; Condé (yellow card) 64'; Bittroff (yellow card) 73'; Tomiak 79' (o.g.); Bell Bell (yellow card) 90+3'	Stadium: Fritz-Walter-Stadion; Attendance: 35,643; Referee: (Germany) Robin Braun

3 September 2022 7	SC Paderborn 07	1–0	1. FC Magdeburg	Paderborn
13:00 CEST (UTC+2)	Rohr (yellow card) 56'; Srbeny (yellow card) 75'; Pieringer 79'	Report	Müller (yellow card) 7'; Lawrence (yellow card) 28' (yellow-red card) 40'; Reimann (yellow card) 42'	Stadium: Home Deluxe Arena; Attendance: 11,213; Referee: (Germany) Sven Waschitzki

11 September 2022 8	1. FC Magdeburg	2–1	Greuther Fürth	Magdeburg
13:30 CEST (UTC+2)	Piccini 38'; Kwarteng 86'	Report	Haddadi (yellow card) 34'; Michalski 42'; Mhamdi (yellow card) 43'; John (yellow card) 55'; Afimico Pululu (yellow card) 90'	Stadium: MDCC-Arena; Attendance: 18,955; Referee: (Germany) Max Burda

17 September 2022 9	Hansa Rostock	3–1	1. FC Magdeburg	Rostock
13:00 CEST (UTC+2)	Pröger 30' 41'; Neidhart (yellow card) 45+2'; Fröde 62' (yellow card) 74'	Report	Condé (yellow card) 59'; Gnaka (yellow card) 71'; Atik 90+4'	Stadium: Ostseestadion; Attendance: 26,500; Referee: (Germany) Harm Osmers

2 October 2022 10	1. FC Magdeburg	1–0	Jahn Regensburg	Magdeburg
13:30 CEST (UTC+2)	Schuler 68'; Elfadli (yellow card) 82'	Report	Albers (yellow card) 39'; Owusu (yellow card) 53'; Thalhammer (yellow card) 76'; Viet (yellow card) 78'	Stadium: MDCC-Arena; Attendance: 18,000; Referee: (Germany) Deniz Aytekin

9 October 2022 11	Sandhausen	1–0	1. FC Magdeburg	Sandhausen
13:30 CEST (UTC+2)	Ajdini (yellow card) 50'; Kinsombi 74'; Bachmann (yellow card) 90'; Papela (yellow card) 90+2'; Đumić (yellow card) 90+5'	Report	Condé (yellow card) 3'; Atik (yellow card) 75'	Stadium: BWT-Stadion am Hardtwald; Attendance: 5,211; Referee: (Germany) Florian Exner

15 October 2022 12	1. FC Magdeburg	0–2	Eintracht Braunschweig	Magdeburg
13:00 CEST (UTC+2)	Bockhorn (yellow card) 27'; Atik (yellow card) 59'	Report	Pherai (yellow card) 12'; Condé 51' (o.g.); Krauße (yellow card) 67'; Ujah (yellow card) 81'; Henning (yellow card) 86' (goal) 90+5'	Stadium: MDCC-Arena; Attendance: 25,601; Referee: (Germany) Martin Petersen

23 October 2022 13	Hamburger SV	2–3	1. FC Magdeburg	Hamburg
13:30 CEST (UTC+2)	Vušković (yellow card) 18'; Königsdörffer 58'; Tom Sanne 90+3'	Report	El Hankouri 11'; Bell Bell (yellow card) 38'; Atik 51'; Rieckmann 88'; Schuler (yellow card) 90+4'	Stadium: Volksparkstadion; Attendance: 55,304; Referee: (Germany) Harm Osmers

28 October 2022 14	1. FC Magdeburg	1–1	1. FC Heidenheim	Magdeburg
18:30 CEST (UTC+2)	Gnaka (yellow card) 63'; Bell Bell (yellow card) 85'; Ito 90+3'	Report	Thomalla 23'; Kleindienst (yellow card) 87'	Stadium: MDCC-Arena; Attendance: 19,352; Referee: (Germany) Martin Thomsen

6 November 2022 15	1. FC Nürnberg	1–2	1. FC Magdeburg	Nürnberg
13:30 CET (UTC+2)	Dæhli (yellow card) 32'; Reimann 64' (o.g.); Schindler (yellow card) 76'; Nürnberger (yellow card) 83'; Shuranov (yellow card) 84'	Report	Bell Bell (yellow card) 36'; Atik (yellow card) 40'; Elfadli (yellow card) 49'; Piccini 58' 76' (pen.); Krempicki (yellow card) 82'	Stadium: Max-Morlock-Stadion; Attendance: 30,277; Referee: (Germany) Nicolas Winter

10 November 2022 16	1. FC Magdeburg	0–1	SV Darmstadt 98	Magdeburg
20:30 CET (UTC+2)	Piccini (red card) 54'; Atik (yellow card) 54'; Bittroff (yellow card) 85'; Müller (yellow card) 90'	Report	Kempe (yellow card) 42'; Pfeiffer (yellow card) 50' (goal) 78'; Vihelmsson (yellow card) 87'; Holland (yellow card) 89'	Stadium: MDCC-Arena; Attendance: 18,788; Referee: (Germany) Wolfgang Haslberger

13 November 2022 17	Arminia Bielefeld	3–1	1. FC Magdeburg	Bielefeld
13:30 CET (UTC+2)	Consbruch 30' (yellow card) 43'; Rzatkowski (yellow card) 33'; Gebauer 65'; Hack 72'	Report	Bell Bell (yellow card) 59'; Ito 73'	Stadium: SchücoArena; Attendance: 24,148; Referee: (Germany) Richard Hempel

27 January 2023 18	Fortuna Düsseldorf	3–2	1. FC Magdeburg	Düsseldorf
18:30 CET (UTC+2)	Kownacki 9' 34' (yellow card) 90'; Klarer (yellow card) 36'; Sobottka (yellow card) 54'; Appelkamp 84'; Hennings (yellow card) 89'	Report	Piccini (yellow card) 5'; Kwarteng 6' 59'; Daniel Heber (yellow card) 29'; Rieckmann (yellow card) 32'; Atik (yellow card) 85'	Stadium: Merkur Spiel-Arena; Attendance: 29,433; Referee: (Germany) Frank Willenborg

5 February 2023 19	1. FC Magdeburg	1–1	Karlsruher SC	Magdeburg
13:30 CET (UTC+2)	Ceka (yellow card) 89'; Elfadli 90+4'	Report	Jung 3' (yellow card) 84'; Franke (yellow card) 78'	Stadium: MDCC-Arena; Attendance: 19,520; Referee: (Germany) Robin Braun

11 February 2023 20	Holstein Kiel	2–3	1. FC Magdeburg	Kiel
13:00 CET (UTC+2)	Erras 33'; Arp 54'; Porath (yellow card) 39'; Reese (yellow card) 69'; Schulz (yellow card) 72'; Sander (yellow card) 76'; Schreiber (yellow card) 79'; Wahl (yellow card) 85'	Report	Kwarteng (yellow card) 1' (goal) 86'; Ullmann (yellow card) 40'; Elfadli 45'; El Hankouri (yellow card) 67'; Bockhorn 70'; Atik (yellow card) 79'; Ceka (yellow card) 79'; Daniel Heber (yellow card) 88'	Stadium: Holstein-Stadion; Attendance: 11,161; Referee: (Germany) Florian Heft

18 February 2023 21	1. FC Magdeburg	1-2	FC St. Pauli	Magdeburg
13:00 CET (UTC+2)	Atik 39'		Irvine 74'; Jakov Medic 88'	Stadium: MDCC-Arena; Attendance: 24,287; Referee: (Germany) Patrick Alt

26 February 2023 22	Hannover 96	1–2	1. FC Magdeburg	Hannover
13:30 CET (UTC+2)	Schaub 69'	Report	Atik 48'; Castaignos 62'	Stadium: Niedersachsenstadion; Attendance: 38,100; Referee: (Germany) Martin Thomsen

3 March 2023 23	1. FC Magdeburg	2-0	1. FC Kaiserslautern	Magdeburg
18:30 CET (UTC+2)	Kwarteng 41'; Ito 65'	Report		Stadium: MDCC-Arena; Attendance: 24,528; Referee: (Germany) Michael Bacher

11 March 2023 24	1. FC Magdeburg	0-0	SC Paderborn	Magdeburg
13:00 CET (UTC+2)		Report		Stadium: MDCC-Arena; Attendance: 20,325; Referee: (Germany) Nicolas Winter

18 March 2023 25	SpVgg Greuther Fürth	3–0	1. FC Magdeburg	Fürth
13:00 CET (UTC+2)	Green 64'; Heber 69' (o.g.); Petkov 75'	Report		Stadium: Sportpark Ronhof; Attendance: 11,619; Referee: (Germany) Florian Exner

2 April 2023 26	1. FC Magdeburg	3-0	FC Hansa Rostock	Magdeburg
13:30 CET (UTC+2)	Conde 29'; Ceka 60'; Ceka 70'	Report		Stadium: MDCC-Arena; Attendance: 26,480; Referee: (Germany) Arne Aarnink

9 April 2023 27	SSV Jahn Regensburg	2–2	1. FC Magdeburg	Regensburg
13:30 CET (UTC+2)	Gnaka 52' (o.g.); Caliskaner 90'	Report	Atik 11'; Elfadli 81'	Stadium: Jahnstadion; Attendance: 10,011; Referee: (Germany) Tobias Stieler

15 April 2023 28	1. FC Magdeburg	1-2	SV Sandhausen	Magdeburg
13:00 CET (UTC+2)	Piccini 89'	Report	Dumic 25'; Dumic 66'	Stadium: MDCC-Arena; Attendance: 23,156; Referee: (Germany) Martin Thomsen

22 April 2023 29	Eintracht Braunschweig	1–2	1. FC Magdeburg	Braunschweig
20:30 CET (UTC+2)	Ujah 69'	Report	Kwarteng 22'; Ito 63'	Stadium: Eintracht-Stadion; Attendance: 23,325; Referee: (Germany) Michael Bacher

29 April 2023 30	1. FC Magdeburg	3-2	Hamburger SV	Magdeburg
13:00 CET (UTC+2)	Kwarteng 32'; Atik 74'; Ito 86'	Report	Kittel 42'; Reis 90+4'	Stadium: MDCC-Arena; Attendance: 27,050; Referee: (Germany) Osmers Harm

7 May 2023 31	1. FC Heidenheim	0–0	1. FC Magdeburg	Heidenheim
13:30 CET (UTC+2)		Report		Stadium: Voith-Arena; Attendance: 15,000; Referee: (Germany) Bastian Dankert

12 May 2023 32	1. FC Magdeburg	2-2	1. FC Nürnberg	Magdeburg
18:30 CET (UTC+2)	Horn 34' (o.g.); Ceka 68'	Report	Lohkemper 54'; Lohkemper 81'	Stadium: MDCC-Arena; Attendance: 26,305; Referee: (Germany) Felix Zwayer

19 May 2023 33	SV Darmstadt 98	1–0	1. FC Magdeburg	Darmstadt
18:30 CET (UTC+2)	Tietz 36'	Report		Stadium: Merck-Stadion am Böllenfalltor; Attendance: 17,650; Referee: (Germany) Harm Osmers

28 May 2023 34	1. FC Magdeburg	4-0	Arminia Bielefeld	Magdeburg
15:30 CET (UTC+2)	Conde 38'; Atik 50' (pen.); Conde 50'; Ceka 67'	Report		Stadium: MDCC-Arena; Attendance: 26,320; Referee: (Germany) Bastian Dankert

=== DFB-Pokal ===
1 August 2022 First Round	1. FC Magdeburg	0 - 4	Eintracht Frankfurt	Magdeburg
20:45	Tim Sechelmann (yellow card) 80'	Report	Kamada 4' 59'; Lindstrøm 31'; Jakić (yellow card) 85'; Alario 90'	Stadium: MDCC-Arena; Attendance: 26,350; Referee: (Germany) Felix Zwayer
