= 2023–24 1. FC Magdeburg season =

1. FC Magdeburg
2023–24 season
- President: Jörg Biastoch
- Manager: Christian Titz
- Stadium: MDCC-Arena
- 2. Bundesliga: 14th
- DFB-Pokal: Round of 16
- Top goalscorer: League: Luca Schuler (6); All: Luca Schuler (7)
- Average home league attendance: 24,988
Home colours

The 2023–24 season was 1. FC Magdeburg's 125th season in existence and second consecutive in the 2. Bundesliga. They also competed in the DFB-Pokal.

== Players ==
=== First-team squad ===
As of 31 July 2023

Note: Flags indicate national team as defined under FIFA eligibility rules; some limited exceptions apply. Players may hold more than one non-FIFA nationality.

No.	Pos.	Nation	Player
1	GK	GER	Dominik Reimann
2	DF	ITA	Cristiano Piccini
3	DF	KOS	Andi Hoti
4	DF	LUX	Eldin Džogović
5	DF	GER	Jamie Lawrence (on loan from Bayern Munich II)
6	MF	LBA	Daniel Elfadli
7	DF	UGA	Herbert Bockhorn
8	MF	GER	Ahmet Arslan
9	FW	NED	Luc Castaignos
10	MF	GER	Jason Ceka
11	MF	MAR	Mohamed El Hankouri
12	DF	SYR	Belal Halbouni
13	MF	GER	Connor Krempicki
15	DF	GER	Daniel Heber

No.	Pos.	Nation	Player
16	MF	ZIM	Jonah Fabisch
17	FW	GER	Alexander Nollenberger
19	FW	GER	Leon Bell Bell
20	FW	ENG	Xavier Amaechi
23	MF	TUR	Barış Atik
24	DF	FRA	Jean Hugonet
25	DF	CIV	Silas Gnaka
26	FW	GER	Luca Schuler
27	DF	GER	Malcolm Cacutalua
29	MF	GER	Amara Condé (captain)
30	GK	GER	Noah Kruth
34	DF	GER	Tarek Chahed
37	FW	JPN	Tatsuya Ito
42	GK	GER	Julian Pollersbeck

== Transfers ==
=== In ===
Pos.	Player	Transferred from	Fee	Date	Source
MF	(Germany) Ahmet Arslan	(Germany) Holstein Kiel	Undisclosed	1 July 2023	
DF	(Kosovo) Andi Hoti	(Italy) Inter Milan	Undisclosed	1 July 2023	
MF	(France) Jean Hugonet	Austria Lustenau	Free	1 July 2023	

=== Out ===
Pos.	Player	Transferred from	Fee	Date	Source

== Pre-season and friendlies ==
Win Draw Loss Fixtures

1 July 2023 Friendly	1. FC Magdeburg (Germany)	4–0	(Germany) SV Westerhausen	Thale
14:00 CEST (UTC+2)	Castaignos 62', 79'; Lawrence 68'; Arslan 86'	Report		Stadium: Wolfsberg-Arena; Attendance: 1,292; Referee: Tim Kohnert

4 July 2023 Friendly	1. FC Magdeburg (Germany)	2–0	(Germany) VSG Altglienicke
14:00 CEST (UTC+2)	Gnaka 22' (pen.); Amaechi 79'

8 July 2023 Friendly	1. FC Magdeburg (Germany)	8–1	(Cyprus) AEZ Zakakiou
17:00 CEST (UTC+2)

14 July 2023 Friendly	FC Nordsjælland (Denmark)	0–2	(Germany) 1. FC Magdeburg
15:00 CEST (UTC+2)			58'; 68'

14 July 2023 Friendly	FC Kitzbühel (Austria)	0–1	(Germany) 1. FC Magdeburg
17:30 CEST (UTC+2)
Note: Match was played in two periods of 30 minutes.

23 July 2023 Friendly	1. FC Magdeburg (Germany)	3–1	(Spain) Sevilla	Magdeburg, Germany
15:00 CEST (UTC+2)	Schuler 14'; Bell Bell 40'; Atik 43'		Schuler 18' (o.g.); Jordán (yellow card) 45'; Nianzou (yellow card) 61'; Ocampos (penalty missed) 76'; Romero (yellow card) 77'	Stadium: MDCC-Arena; Attendance: 14,150; Referee: Daniel Bartnitzki (Germany)

7 September 2023 Friendly	1. FC Magdeburg (Germany)	1–1	(Germany) FC Erzgebirge Aue
12:00 CEST (UTC+2)

12 October 2023 Friendly	1. FC Magdeburg (Germany)	4–2	(Germany) Eintracht Braunschweig
13:30 CEST (UTC+2)

6 January 2024 Friendly	Dynamo Dresden (Germany)	2–2	(Germany) 1. FC Magdeburg	Belek, Turkey
15:00 TRT (UTC+3)	Kutschke 8'; Lemmer 54'		Fabisch 84'; Arslan 85'
Note: Match was played in two periods of 60 minutes.

9 January 2024 Friendly	Sepsi OSK (Romania)	2–1	(Germany) 1. FC Magdeburg	Turkey
15:00 TRT (UTC+3)
Note: Match was played in four periods of 30 minutes.

12 January 2024 Friendly	MTK (Hungary)	2–4	(Germany) 1. FC Magdeburg	Turkey
13:00 TRT (UTC+3)

21 March 2024 Friendly	Union Berlin (Germany)	3–1	(Germany) 1. FC Magdeburg	Berlin
12:00 CET (UTC+1))

== Competitions ==
=== Overall record ===
Competition	First match	Last match	Starting round	Final position	Record							
Competition	First match	Last match	Starting round	Final position	Pld	W	D	L	GF	GA	GD	Win %
2. Bundesliga	28 July 2023	19 May 2024	Matchday 1	14th	34	9	11	14	46	54	−8	26.47
DFB-Pokal	14 August 2023	5 December 2023	First round	Round of 16	3	1	1	1	6	6	+0	33.33
Total					37	10	12	15	52	60	−8	27.03

Source: Soccerway

=== 2. Bundesliga ===
==== League table ====
Pos	Team	Pld	W	D	L	GF	GA	GD	Pts	Qualification or relegation
12	1. FC Nürnberg	34	11	7	16	43	64	−21	40	
13	1. FC Kaiserslautern	34	11	6	17	59	64	−5	39	
14	1. FC Magdeburg	34	9	11	14	46	54	−8	38	
15	Eintracht Braunschweig	34	11	5	18	37	53	−16	38	
16	Wehen Wiesbaden (R)	34	8	8	18	36	50	−14	32	Qualification for relegation play-offs

Source: DFB
Rules for classification: 1) Points; 2) Goal difference; 3) Goals scored; 4) Head-to-head results; 5) Head-to-head away goals scored; 6) Away goals scored; 7) Play-off.
(Rules 4–6 only apply after home and away matches have been played between the tied teams.)
(R) Relegated

==== Results summary ====
Overall								Home						Away					
Pld	W	D	L	GF	GA	GD	Pts	W	D	L	GF	GA	GD	W	D	L	GF	GA	GD
34	9	11	14	46	54	−8	38	6	6	5	27	23	+4	3	5	9	19	31	−12

Last updated: 28 May 2024.
Source: DFB

==== Results by round ====
Round	1	2	3	4	5	6	7	8	9	10	11	12	13	14	15	16	17	18	19	20	21	22	23	24	25	26	27	28	29	30	31	32	33	34
Ground	A	H	A	A	H	A	H	A	H	A	H	A	H	A	H	A	H	H	A	H	H	A	H	A	H	A	H	A	H	A	H	A	H	A
Result	D	W	W	D	W	L	D	L	D	L	L	L	L	W	W	D	L	W	L	D	W	L	W	D	L	L	L	D	D	W	D	L	D	L
Position	10	5	2	4	3	5	6	7	8	10	13	13	14	13	12	12	13	12	13	13	12	12	11	12	12	12	13	12	13	12	11	12	13	14

Updated to match(es) played on 28 May 2024. Source: DFB
A = Away; H = Home; W = Win; D = Draw; L = Loss

==== Matches ====
The league fixtures were unveiled on 30 June 2023.

29 July 2023 1	Wehen Wiesbaden	1–1	1. FC Magdeburg	Wiesbaden
13:00	Prtajin 62'	Report	Schuler 29'	Stadium: Brita-Arena; Attendance: 7,219; Referee: Benjamin Brandt

6 August 2023 2	1. FC Magdeburg	2–1	Eintracht Braunschweig	Magdeburg
13:30	Schuler 22'; Conde 32'	Report	Ujah 90+4'	Stadium: MDCC-Arena; Attendance: 28,350; Referee: Daniel Siebert

20 August 2023 3	Holstein Kiel	2–4	1. FC Magdeburg	Kiel
13:30	Skrzybski 32'; Sander 50'	Report	Schuler 2'; Hugonet 21'; Castaignos 68'; Arslan 90+1'	Stadium: Holstein-Stadion; Attendance: 12,400; Referee: Nicolas Winter

27 August 2023 4	FC St. Pauli	0–0	1. FC Magdeburg	Hamburg
13:30		Report		Stadium: Millerntor-Stadion; Attendance: 29.546; Referee: Sven Jablonski

2 September 2023 5	1. FC Magdeburg	6–4	Hertha BSC	Magdeburg
13:00	Gnaka 7'; Schuler 37'; Ceka 49'; Bell Bell 58'; El Hankouri 68'; Arslan 90+3'	Report	Reese 2'; Winkler 22'; Tabakovic 42'; Tabakovic 55'	Stadium: MDCC-Arena; Attendance: 26,872; Referee: Tom Bauer

16 September 2023 6	Schalke 04	4–3	1. FC Magdeburg	Gelsenkirchen
20:30	Gnaka 16'; Gnaka 27'; Krempicki 67'	Report	Polter 40'; Murkin 62'; Ouwejan 69'; Polter 79' (pen.)	Stadium: Veltins-Arena; Attendance: 61.755; Referee: Michael Bacher

22 September 2023 7	1. FC Magdeburg	1–1	SC Paderborn	Magdeburg
18:30	Castaignos 85'	Report	Grimaldi 35'	Stadium: MDCC-Arena; Attendance: 24,123; Referee: Dr. Felix Brych

1 October 2023 8	1. FC Nürnberg	1–0	1. FC Magdeburg	Nürnberg
13:30	Lohkemper 46'	Report		Stadium: Max-Morlock-Stadion; Attendance: 33,106; Referee: Robin Braun

7 October 2023 9	1. FC Magdeburg	1–1	Karlsruher SC	Magdeburg
13:00	Castaignos 49'	Report	Schleusener 11'	Stadium: MDCC-Arena; Attendance: 24,366; Referee: Florian Lechner

20 October 2023 10	Hannover 96	2–1	1. FC Magdeburg	Hannover
18:30	Leopold 11'; Teuchert 61' (pen.)	Report	Atik 57'	Stadium: Niedersachsenstadion; Attendance: 38,200; Referee: Arne Aarnink

29 October 2023 11	1. FC Magdeburg	1–2	SV Elversberg	Magdeburg
13:30	Krempicki 70'	Report	Rochelt 12'; Neubauer 35'	Stadium: MDCC-Arena; Attendance: 22,166; Referee: Lukas Benen

4 November 2023 12	Hamburger SV	2–0	1. FC Magdeburg	Hamburg
20:30	Benes 9'; Jatta 72'	Report		Stadium: Volksparkstadion; Attendance: 56,800; Referee: Florian Exner

12 November 2023 13	1. FC Magdeburg	1–2	Hansa Rostock	Magdeburg
13:30	Bockhorn 4'	Report	Dressel 46'; Krempicki 86' (o.g.)	Stadium: MDCC-Arena; Attendance: 26,600; Referee: Florian Badstübner

25 November 2023 14	VfL Osnabrück	0–2	1. FC Magdeburg	Osnabrück
13:00		Report	Atik 52'; Schuler 71'	Stadium: Stadion an der Bremer Brücke; Attendance: 15,741; Referee: Robert Kampka

2 December 2023 15	1. FC Magdeburg	4–1	1. FC Kaiserslautern	Magdeburg
20:30	Castaignos 17'; Bockhorn 51'; Krempicki 75'; Piccini 86' (pen.)	Report	Boyd 25'	Stadium: MDCC-Arena; Attendance: 25,214; Referee: Marco Fritz

9 December 2023 16	Greuther Fürth	1–1	1. FC Magdeburg	Fürth
13:00	Lemperle 59'	Report	El Hankouri 90+5'	Stadium: Sportpark Ronhof Thomas Sommer; Attendance: 10,796; Referee: Florian Heft

16 December 2023 17	1. FC Magdeburg	2–3	Fortuna Düsseldorf	Magdeburg
	Bockhorn 17'; Amaechi 37'	Report	Vermeij 46'; Appelkamp 70'; Vermeij 75'	Stadium: MDCC-Arena; Attendance: 20,647; Referee: Michael Bacher

21 January 2024 18	1. FC Magdeburg	1–0	Wehen Wiesbaden	Magdeburg
	Ito 80'	Report		Stadium: MDCC-Arena; Attendance: 22,582; Referee: Patrick Alt

27 January 2024 19	Eintracht Braunschweig	1–0	1. FC Magdeburg	Braunschweig
	Bicakcic 80'	Report		Stadium: Eintracht-Stadion; Attendance: 22,582; Referee: Bastian Dankert

3 February 2024 20	1. FC Magdeburg	1–1	Holstein Kiel	Magdeburg
	Kuhinja 90+5'	Report	Becker 27'	Stadium: MDCC-Arena; Attendance: 20,097; Referee: Florian Lechner

10 February 2024 21	1. FC Magdeburg	1–0	FC St. Pauli	Magdeburg
	Atik 72'	Report		Stadium: MDCC-Arena; Attendance: 25,187; Referee: Dr. Max Burda

16 February 2024 22	Hertha BSC	3–2	1. FC Magdeburg	Berlin
18:30 CET (UTC+01:00)	Reese 33' (pen.); Dardai 39'; Reese 59'	Report	Atik 21'; Müller 51'	Stadium: Olympiastadion; Attendance: 52,652; Referee: Florian Exner

24 February 2024 23	1. FC Magdeburg	3–0	Schalke 04	Magdeburg
20:30 CET (UTC+01:00)	Gnaka 17'; El Hankouri 35' (pen.); Ito 45+2'	Report		Stadium: MDCC-Arena; Attendance: 27,038; Referee: Christian Dingert

3 March 2024 24	SC Paderborn	0–0	1. FC Magdeburg	Paderborn
13.30 CET (UTC+01:00)		Report		Stadium: Home Deluxe Arena; Attendance: 13,566; Referee: Nicolas Winter

9 March 2024 25	1. FC Magdeburg	0–1	1. FC Nürnberg	Magdeburg
20.30 CET (UTC+01:00)		Report	Uzun 80'	Stadium: MDCC-Arena; Attendance: 26,500; Referee: Tobias Reichel

17 March 2024 26	Karlsruher SC	7–0	1. FC Magdeburg	Karlsruhe
13.30 CET (UTC+01:00)		Report		Stadium: BBBank Wildpark; Attendance: 27.000; Referee: Sören Storks

31 March 2024 27	1. FC Magdeburg	0–3	Hannover 96	Magdeburg
13.30 CEST (UTC+02:00)		Report		Stadium: MDCC-Arena; Attendance: 26.440; Referee: Florian Lechner

6 April 2024 28	SV Elversberg	0–0	1. FC Magdeburg	Spiesen-Elversberg
13.00 CEST (UTC+02:00)		Report		Stadium: Waldstadion an der Kaiserlinde; Attendance: 8:864; Referee: Patrick Ittrich

14 April 2024 29	1. FC Magdeburg	2–2	Hamburger SV	Magdeburg
13.30 CEST (UTC+02:00)		Report		Stadium: MDCC-Arena; Attendance: 27.090; Referee: Robert Kampka

21 April 2024 30	Hansa Rostock	0–2	1. FC Magdeburg	Rostock
13.30 CEST (UTC+02:00)		Report		Stadium: Ostseestadion; Attendance: 27.500; Referee: Daniel Schlager

28 April 2024 31	1. FC Magdeburg	1–1	VfL Osnabrück	Magdeburg
13.30 CEST (UTC+02:00)		Report		Stadium: MDCC-Arena; Attendance: 25.882

4 May 2024 32	1. FC Kaiserslautern	4–1	1. FC Magdeburg	Kaiserslautern
20.30 CEST (UTC+02:00)		Report		Stadium: Fritz-Walter-Stadion

11 May 2024 33	1. FC Magdeburg	0–0	Greuther Fürth	Magdeburg
				Stadium: MDCC-Arena

18 May 2024 34	Fortuna Düsseldorf	3–2	1. FC Magdeburg	Düsseldorf
				Stadium: Merkur Spiel-Arena

=== DFB-Pokal ===
14 August 2023 First round	Jahn Regensburg	1–2	1. FC Magdeburg	Regensburg
18:00				Stadium: Jahnstadion Regensburg

1 November 2023 Second round	Holstein Kiel	3–3 (a.e.t.) (3–4 p)	1. FC Magdeburg	Kiel
18:00				Stadium: Holstein-Stadion

5 December 2023 Round of 16	1. FC Magdeburg	1–2	Fortuna Düsseldorf	Magdeburg
18:00				Stadium: MDCC-Arena
