= Jason Ceka =

German footballer (born 1999)

Personal information
- Date of birth: 10 November 1999 (age 27)
- Place of birth: Essen, Germany
- Height: 1.69 m (5 ft 7 in)
- Position: Winger

Team information
- Current team: Cambuur (on loan from SV Elversberg)
- Number: 30

Youth career
- 2003–2007: VfB Frohnhausen
- 2007–2011: Rot-Weiss Essen
- 2011–2016: Schalke 04
- 2016–2017: Rot-Weiss Essen
- 2017–2018: Schalke 04

Senior career*
Years	Team	Apps	(Gls)
2018–2021	Schalke 04 II	70	(20)
2021–2025	1. FC Magdeburg	90	(17)
2025	1. FC Magdeburg II	11	(10)
2025–	SV Elversberg	7	(1)
2026	→ Dynamo Dresden (loan)	17	(2)
2026–	→ Cambuur (loan)	4	(1)

International career^{‡}
2017	Germany U18	1	(0)
- * Club domestic league appearances and goals as of 11 October 2026 ‡ National team caps and goals as of 18:44, 27 July 2021 (UTC)

Jason Ceka (born 10 November 1999) is a German professional footballer who plays as a winger for Eredivisie club Cambuur, on loan from Bundesliga club SV Elversberg.

After playing youth football for VfB Frohnhausen, Rot-Weiss Essen and Schalke 04, Ceka made his senior debut for Schalke 04 II in 2018 and went on to score 20 goals in 70 games for Schalke 04 II across a three-year spell. He joined 3. Liga side 1. FC Magdeburg in summer 2021.

== Club career ==
=== Early career ===
Born in Essen, Ceka started his youth career at VfB Frohnhausen aged 4 before joining Rot-Weiss Essen aged 9. He joined Schalke 04 after four years at Rot-Weiss Essen. He spent the 2016–17 season at Rot-Weiss Essen before returning to Schalke for the 2017–18 season. He was promoted to the Schalke 04 II team ahead of the 2018–19 season, and scored 8 times in 28 Oberliga Westfalen matches, with Schalke II winning promotion to the Regionalliga West. He made 17 appearances without scoring during the 2019–20 season and scored 12 in 25 matches during the 2020–21 season.

=== 1. FC Magdeburg ===
In June 2021, Ceka joined 3. Liga club 1. FC Magdeburg on a two-year contract with the option of an extension. He made his debut for the club on 24 July 2021 as a substitute on a 2–0 win over Waldhof Mannheim. He scored his first two goals of the season in consecutive appearances in October 2021, the first coming in a 4–0 win over Türkgücü München and the second in a 3–2 win away to SV Meppen. Following his third goal of the season in a 2–0 win over SC Verl on 7 November 2021, Ceka was compared to Lionel Messi by his teammate Alexander Bittroff; Ceka stated that "das ist ein schönes Kompliment, aber das kann ich nicht ernstnehmen" ("it's a nice compliment, but I can't take it seriously").

=== SV Elversberg ===
On 30 May 2025, Ceka signed a three-year contract with SV Elversberg. On 22 December 2025, he was loaned by Dynamo Dresden.

On 2 September 2026, Ceka was loaned by Cambuur in the Netherlands.

== International career ==
Ceka was born in Germany to Albanian parents. He has made one appearance for Germany national under-18 team, coming on as a substitute in a 3–0 win over Austria U18 on 17 April 2017.

== Career statistics ==
As of match played 17 May 2026

Appearances and goals by club, season and competition
Club	Season	League			DFB-Pokal		Other		Total	
Club	Season	Division	Apps	Goals	Apps	Goals	Apps	Goals	Apps	Goals
Schalke 04 II	2018–19	Oberliga Westfalen	28	8	—		—		28	8
Schalke 04 II	2019–20	Regionalliga West	17	0	—		—		17	0
Schalke 04 II	2020–21	Regionalliga West	25	12	—		—		25	12
Schalke 04 II	Total		70	20	—		—		70	20
1. FC Magdeburg	2021–22	3. Liga	36	11	1	0	3 (Note: Appearances in Saxony-Anhalt Cup)	1	40	12
1. FC Magdeburg	2022–23	2. Bundesliga	29	5	1	0	—		30	5
1. FC Magdeburg	2023–24	2. Bundesliga	22	1	2	0	—		24	1
1. FC Magdeburg	2024–25	2. Bundesliga	3	0	0	0	—		3	0
1. FC Magdeburg	Total		90	17	4	0	3	1	97	18
1. FC Magdeburg II	2024–25	NOFV-Oberliga Süd	11	10	—		—		11	10
SV Elversberg	2025–26	2. Bundesliga	7	1	0	0	—		7	1
SV Elversberg	2026–27	Bundesliga	0	0	0	0	—		0	0
SV Elversberg	Total		7	1	0	0	—		7	1
Dynamo Dresden (loan)	2025–26	2. Bundesliga	17	2	—		—		17	2
Career total			195	50	4	0	3	1	202	50
