= Luc Castaignos =

Dutch footballer (born 1992)

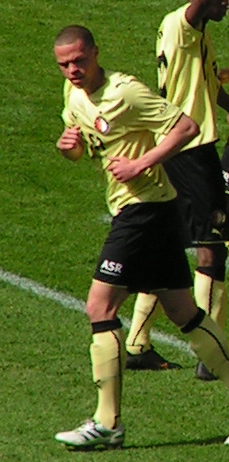
- Castaignos with Feyenoord in 2011

Personal information
- Full name: Luc Castaignos
- Date of birth: 27 September 1992 (age 34)
- Place of birth: Schiedam, Netherlands
- Height: 1.87 m (6 ft 2 in)
- Position: Forward

Youth career
- 1997–2006: Excelsior '20
- 2006–2007: Spartaan '20
- 2007–2009: Feyenoord

Senior career*
Years	Team	Apps	(Gls)
2009–2011	Feyenoord	42	(15)
2011–2012	Inter Milan	8	(1)
2012–2015	Twente	114	(42)
2015–2016	Eintracht Frankfurt	22	(5)
2016–2019	Sporting CP	17	(0)
2017–2018	→ Vitesse (loan)	36	(3)
2019–2020	Gyeongnam	34	(6)
2021–2022	OFI	20	(1)
2023–2024	1. FC Magdeburg	26	(5)

International career
2008–2009	Netherlands U17	17	(13)
2010–2011	Netherlands U19	17	(8)
2012	Netherlands U20	1	(0)
2011–2014	Netherlands U21	15	(6)
- * Club domestic league appearances and goals as of 22 May 2024

Luc Castaignos (born 27 September 1992) is a Dutch former professional footballer who played as a forward.

== Club career ==
=== Early career ===
The roots of Castaignos' family are located in the département of Landes, one hundred kilometers south of Bordeaux in the south-west of France. There, Castaignos' father, the French-born Jean-Luc Castaignos, met Castaignos' mother who is of Cape Verdean descent and holder of an Italian passport. In October 1990, two years before Luc's birth, the family moved to the Netherlands.

Castaignos started his youth career at the local Schiedam club Excelsior '20. The youngster lived close to Sportpark Thurlede, the home ground of the Catholic club. His former Excelsior '20 coach, Paul Benschop, was soon convinced by Castaignos' quality: "Everyone could see how much potential he had. Whenever we conceded a goal, Luc would take care of business." At the age of 13, he participated on regional club Spartaan '20's opening day. The club from Rotterdam, youth partner of Feyenoord, saw plenty of potential in the youngster and invited him to join. Castaignos only played one season for Spartaan '20. When various professional clubs showed their interest, Spartaan '20 warned Feyenoord. At the age of 14, he joined the Feyenoord Academy in the summer of 2007. On 30 October 2008, Castaignos signed his first professional contract with Feyenoord, keeping him at De Kuip until summer 2011 with an option for another two seasons. He then progressed through the academy.

=== Feyenoord ===
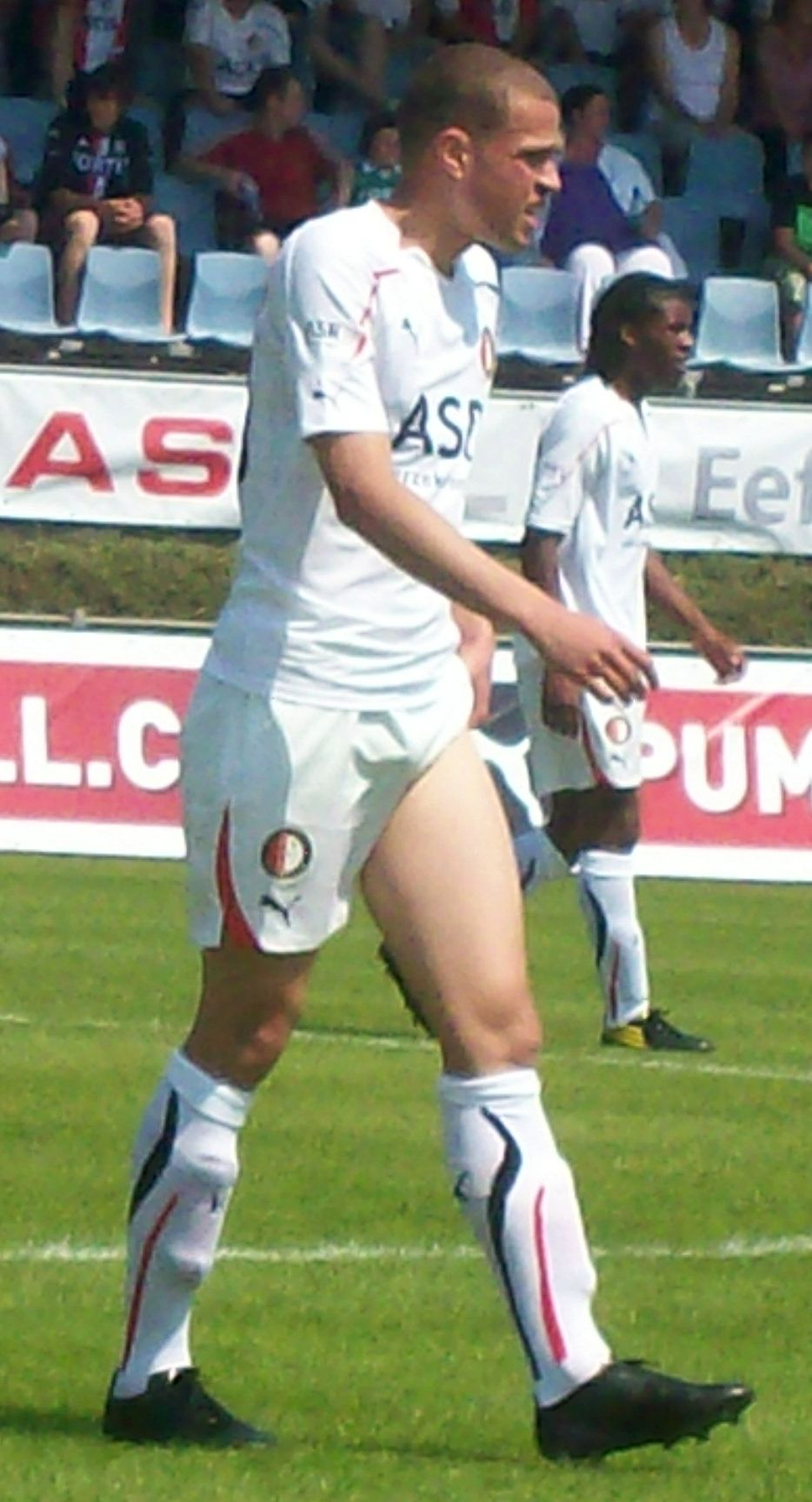
Castaignos playing for Feyenoord in 2011

After a successful performance with the Netherlands U17 at the 2009 UEFA European Under-17 Football Championship, a clutch of sides were linked to the Dutch youngster. Besides Arsenal, also Liverpool, Manchester United, Real Madrid, Inter Milan, Bayern Munich and TSG 1899 Hoffenheim showed their interest in the Feyenoord's top scorer. However, on 22 July 2009, Castaignos crushed all rumours and told Feyenoord manager Mario Been and technical advisor Leo Beenhakker that he wanted to stay in Rotterdam. On 21 June 2009, Been announced he invited Castaignos to train with the first team squad a few times a week. On 13 August 2009, he trained with the first team squad for the first time. Castaignos made his official debut in Feyenoord's first team on 24 September 2009 replacing Leroy Fer in the 72nd minute in the KNVB Cup away match against Harkemase Boys and helped the club win 5–0. After making his first team debut for Feyenoord, he said: "It's strange, because I haven't really proven anything yet. My strengths are my speed and scoring ability, the heading and my left leg could be even better. I can learn a lot from a player like Roy Makaay. Now and then I ask for advice, but I mainly look at the training at which moments he walks away and so on. My debut is a first step, but there are still many steps to follow." At one point, due to his lack of first team opportunities, Castaignos was expected to be loaned out to SBV Excelsior but he ended up staying at the club due to his latter injury. Five months later after making his first team debut and being on the unused bench, Castaignos made his debut, coming on for Jon Dahl Tomasson in a 3–2 loss against Groningen on 28 February 2010. A month later on 24 March 2010, he made his first start of the season against FC Twente in the second leg of the KNVB Cup semi–finals and helped the club win 2–1 to reach the final. Later in the 2009–10 season, Castaignos would make two more appearances and the club would finish in fourth place.

The 2010–11 season campaign proved to be Castaignos' breakout season, stemming from squad rotation and losses in the transfer market. He made his UEFA Europa League debut, coming on as a 77th-minute substitute, in a 1–0 win against Gent in the first leg of the play-off rounds (as Feyenoord went on to lose 2–0 in the return leg and was eliminated from the tournament). Following the club's elimination in the UEFA Europa League, Castaignos scored his first career goal for Feyenoord, in a 4–0 win against Vitesse on 28 August 2010. As a result, the club began talks with the player over a new contract. However, he rejected a contract extension, leaving his future at Feyenoord uncertain. Amid to the contract rejection, he scored three goals in three matches between 31 October 2010 and 14 November 2010 against AZ Alkmaar, Roda JC and SC Heerenveen. Castaignos changed his mind when he signed a contract extension with the club, keeping him until 2013, but his agent disputed the claims that the deal was done. Castaignos later scored two more goals by the end of the year, coming against ADO Den Haag on 28 November 2010 and SBV Excelsior on 11 December 2010. In a friendly match against Sparta Rotterdam on 5 January 2011, he received a straight red card in the 57th minute for kicking an opponent, in a 4–2 win. After the match, Castaignos was investigated for his actions by the KNVB, but no action was taken against him. During the same month, he suffered ankle injury while training but quickly recovered from the injury. A month later against Vitesse on 6 February 2011, Castaignos scored his seventh goal of the season, in a 1–1 draw. Two weeks later on 20 February 2011, he scored his first brace of his career, in a 2–2 draw against ADO Den Haag. Two weeks later on 6 March 2011, Castaignos scored his tenth goal of the season, in a 1–0 win against SC Heerenveen. This was followed up by scoring his eleventh goal of the season, in a 2–1 win against NAC Breda. He went on to score four goals in the last four matches of the season that saw Feyenoord finish 10th place in the league, missing out on the Europa League in the process. At the end of the 2010–11 season, Castaignos went on to make 37 appearances and scoring fifteen times in all competitions. He later said in an interview about his desire on returning to Feyenoord one day.

=== Inter Milan ===
As a result of rejecting a new contract with Feyenoord, Castaignos was on the rampant speculation during the January transfer window, with Italian giants Inter Milan, PSV Eindhoven, Tottenham Hotspur and Valencia were interested in signing the player. In the January transfer window, Inter Milan had their €3 million bid rejected by Feyenoord for Castaignos. After months of agreement, it was finally announced on 4 March 2011 by Feyenoord that the club had agreed to terms with Inter Milan, selling the player for a fee believed to be around €3 million upon the completions of the 2010–2011 season. Upon joining the club, he said: "As a striker you always want to score, but I had hoped to say goodbye with European football. The choice for Inter was a choice based on feeling. I hope that I can become a better football player there. Of course I am really looking forward to going in that direction and developing myself as footballer. I want to become a top player."

Castaignos was featured throughout preseason, most notably scoring the opening goal in a friendly against Celtic on 30 July 2011. He made his competitive debut for Inter Milan in a Supercoppa Italiana, coming on for Joel Obi in a 2–1 loss against Milan, and played in front of 70,000 people at Beijing National Stadium, Beijing China PR. However, Castaignos was controversially dropped from the UEFA Champions League squad. This led the club's chairman Massimo Moratti commenting on the situation on the player, saying: "I was very sorry for Castaignos because he is a great guy, if this story came up he would play him. It's pretty bad, but it's not like you hit someone. We just have to avoid these things." Despite hops of his inclusion in the squad for the tournament, Castaignos remained out of the squad. He made his full league debut, starting a match before being substituted at half time, in a 3–1 loss against Novara on 20 September 2011. Castaignos then scored his first goal in Serie A in an away match to Siena on 27 November 2011, latching on to Thiago Motta's through ball before firing low past Brkić, which proved to be the game winner. However, Castaignos found his first team opportunities limited, due to competitions in the striker positions.

As a result of his lack of first team opportunities, Castaignos was linked a move away from the club, as European clubs from Italy and his homeland country, including PSV Eindhoven were interested in signing him. Ultimately, he stayed at Inter Milan after his agent ruled out of suggestions about the player being loaned out. During a 3–0 loss against Bologna on 17 February 2012, Castaignos was involved in altercation with Andrea Raggi after he spat on Raggi in the 85th minute. After the match, Serie A officials reviewed footage of the incident and he was subsequently banned for three matches. Even after serving a three match suspension, his actions caused Inter to immediately move him into a reserve role, scoring twice in three appearances for the reserve squad and only playing once in the league. However, Castaignos then suffered a hamstring injury, missing out for the rest of the season during a match against Padova Primavera on 4 April 2012 and was sidelined for the rest of the 2011–12 season. At the end of the 2011–12 season, he went on to make eight appearances and scoring once in all competitions.

Following this, his future at Inter Milan was uncertain when Castaignos was linked with a move away from the club. It came after when he was linked with a move to clubs around Premier League clubs, such as, Liverpool, West Ham United, Everton and even his former club, Feyenoord. On 20 June 2012, Castaignos announced his intention to leave Inter in favor of a 'big club'.

=== FC Twente ===
On 28 July 2012, Castaignos made his return to the Eredivisie when FC Twente agreed to terms with Inter Milan for €6 million. The move was confirmed on 30 July 2012 when he signed a four–year contract with the club and was given a number thirty shirt. Castaignos was seen as the replacement for the former Twente striker Luuk de Jong, who had been sold to Borussia Mönchengladbach.

Castaignos made his debut for FC Twente, coming on as a 70th-minute substitute for Dmitri Bulykin, in a 4–1 win over FC Groningen in the opening game of the season. On 26 August 2012, he scored his first goal for the club and set up a goal for Dmitri Bulykin in a 3–1 win over NEC Nijmegen. Four days later on 30 August 2012, Castaignos helped FC Twente when he set up a goal for Felipe Gutiérrez, in a 4–1 win against Bursaspor in the second leg of the UEFA Europa League play-off round and helping the club progress to the group stage. Since joining FC Twente, Castaignos quickly established himself as the club's first choice striker and was living up to his potential as De Jong's successor. His second goal for Twente came on 15 September 2012, in a 6–2 win against Willem II. He then scored two goals in two matches between 7 October 2012 and 20 October 2012 against AZ Alkmaar and Roda JC respectively. In a match against FC Den Bosch in the third round of the KNVB Cup on 30 October 2012, Castaignos set up the club's only goal of the game, but was sent–off for a second bookable offence, in a 2–1 loss. Although his suspension only effect on the KNVB Cup and went on to serve a suspension the following season, he scored his fifth goal of the season, in a 3–0 win against his former club, Feyenoord on 4 November 2012. By the end of the year, Castaignos scored four more goals, including two goals in two matches between 14 December 2012 and 21 December 2012 against Heracles Almelo and AZ Alkmaar respectively. He had to wait until on 17 March 2013 to score his tenth goal of the season, in a 3–0 win against FC Groningen. Castaignos later scored four more goals later in the 2012–13 season, including two goals in two matches between 21 April 2013 and 28 April 2013 against VVV-Venlo and NEC Nijmegen. He was featured in four matches in the play-offs spot for the UEFA Europa League next season, as FC Twente lost 3–2 against FC Utrecht in the final. Despite suffering one injury throughout the 2012–13 season, Castaignos went on to make 44 appearances and scoring fourteen times in all competitions, making him the league's top scorer for the club.

At the start of the 2013–14 season, Castaignos started the season well for FC Twente when he scored against Feyenoord on 11 August 2013 and twice against FC Utrecht in a follow–up match. Since the start of the 2013–14 season, he continued to established himself as the club's first choice striker. During a 2–2 draw against PSV Eindhoven on 14 September 2013 in which Castaignos set up two goals, he was involved in an altercation with Stijn Schaars once the match was full time, leading to a scuffle involving several players. After the match, it was announced that Castaignos would not face charges by the KNVB. He scored three goals in three matches between 4 October 2013 and 26 October 2013 against SC Cambuur, Ajax and ADO Den Haag. After quickly recovering from a head injury while on international duty, Castaignos scored two goals in two matches between 24 November 2013 and 29 November 2013 against NAC Breda and Roda JC respectively. He scored four goals in four matches between 14 December 2013 and 2 February 2014. Castaignos scored two goals in two matches between 15 February 2014 and 23 February 2014 against Vitesse and Feyenoord. He played every league match until being suspended for one match for picking a yellow card during a 1–0 loss against Go Ahead Eagles on 9 March 2014. After serving a one match suspension, Castaignos made his return to the starting line–up against Ajax on 30 March 2014 and played 70 minutes before being substituted, in a 3–0 loss. However, his return was short–lived when he was sent–off in the 88th minute, in a 1–1 draw against ADO Den Haag on 2 April 2014. After serving a two match suspension, Castaignos returned to the starting line–up against NEC Nijmegen on 27 April 2014 and helped FC Twente qualify for the UEFA Europa League next season. At the end of the 2013–14 season, he went on to make 31 appearances and scoring fourteen times in all competitions.

Ahead of the 2014–15 season, Castaignos was linked with a move to Bundesliga side Bayer Leverkusen and Premier League side Swansea City. But he ended up staying at the club throughout the summer transfer window. At the start of the 2014–15 season, Castaignos continued to established himself as FC Twente's first choice striker. He scored two goals in two matches between 24 August 2014 and 28 August 2014 against NAC Breda and Qarabağ respectively. His goal scoring form throughout September was added to a total of six, including scoring two consecutive goals against Heracles Almelo and Achilles '29. A month later on 26 October 2014, Castaignos scored his ninth goal of the season, in a 2–1 loss against SBV Excelsior. He then scored three more goals between 23 November 2014 and 30 November 2014, including a brace against PEC Zwolle. However, Castaignos suffered a setback when he suffered an eye injury and was sidelined for a month. Castaignos previously suffered a hamstring injury two months prior while on international duty but he quickly recovered. Castaignos returned to the starting line–up against his former club, Feyenoord on 17 January 2015, as the club lost 3–1. Ten days later on 27 January 2015, he scored his thirteenth goal of the season, in a 3–0 win against AZ Alkmaar in the quarter–finals of the KNVB Cup. On 28 February 2015, Castaignos scored his fourteenth goal of the season, in a 1–1 draw against NAC Breda. However, during a 2–0 win against PEC Zwolle on 14 March 2015, he suffered a hamstring injury and was substituted at half time. After missing two matches, Castaignos returned to the first team from injury, coming on as a 71st-minute substitute, in a 3–1 win against Go Ahead Eagles on 12 April 2015. At the end of the 2014–15 season, he went on to make 35 appearances and scoring fourteen times in all competitions.

=== Eintracht Frankfurt ===
After three prolific seasons at Twente, Castaignos was expected to leave FC Twente in the summer transfer window, due to the club's financial problems. As a result, he was linked with a move to Swansea City and Bundesliga outfit Eintracht Frankfurt. On 29 June 2015, it was reported that Eintracht Frankfurt agreed to sign Castaignos for a reported €4 million move. The move was confirmed the next day, with the player signed a three–year contract with the club. However, the transfer fee was disputed, as it cost whether €2.5 million and €4 million.

However, during a 2–1 win against Leeds United in a friendly match on 21 July 2015, he suffered a thigh injury and had to be substituted in the 20th minute. This threatened to cause him to miss the start of the 2015–16 season by being sidelined between two and four weeks. But Castaignos quickly made a full recovery from a thigh injury. He made his debut for the club in the first round of the DFB–Pokal against Bremer SV on 8 August 2015 and scored his first goal for Eintracht Frankfurt, in a 3–0 win. Castaignos scored two braces in two matches between 29 August 2015 and 12 September 2015, winning both matches against VfB Stuttgart and 1. FC Köln. Since joining the club, he quickly become involved in the first team, becoming Eintracht Frankfurt's first choice striker with Haris Seferovic. After a promising start at the club, Castaignos' performance was criticised due to not scoring regularly and was demoted to the substitute bench as a result. But his performance soon improved, with manager Armin Veh acknowledging his adaption to the German style. However, Castaignos suffered ankle injury during a match against Bayer Leverkusen on 21 November 2015 and was substituted in the 22nd minute, as Eintracht Frankfurt lost 3–1. After the match, it was announced that the player would be sidelined for three months. On 12 March 2016, he made his return from injury, coming on as an 86th-minute substitute, in a 3–0 loss against Borussia Mönchengladbach. Following his return from injury, Castaignos continued to be relegated to the bench in the second part of the season, as well as, his goal drought. He played in the first leg of the Bundesliga play-offs against 1. FC Nürnberg as the late substitute and the club went on to win 2–1 on aggregate to avoid relegation. At the end of the 2015–16 season, Castaignos went on to make 21 appearances and scoring five times in all competitions.

Ahead of the 2016–17 season, Castaignos was expected to stay at Eintracht Frankfurt. It came after when Galatasaray, Sporting CP, Newcastle United and Southampton. He made first and only appearance for the club against 1. FC Magdeburg in the first round of the DFB–Pokal. With his first opportunities at Eintracht Frankfurt, it was expected that Castaignos would be leaving the club.

=== Sporting CP ===
In summer 2016, Castaignos joined compatriot Bas Dost at Portuguese side Sporting CP on a three-year deal. The transfer move reported to have cost €2.5 million and a buyout clause of €60 million. Upon joining the club, he was given a number twenty shirt.

Castaignos made his long-awaited debut for Sporting CP, coming on as a 61st-minute substitute, in a 1–1 draw against Tondela on 22 October 2016. He was handed his first start for Sporting only on 2 November 2016, in a Champions League match against Borussia Dortmund and 45 minutes before being substituted, in a 1–0 loss. However, Castaignos found his first team opportunities limited and found his playing time, coming from the substitute bench. He also found himself plagued with injuries along the way. At the end of the 2016–17 season, Castaignos made thirteen appearances in all competitions. Following this, Publico named the player as one of the club's worst signing of the season.

Following his loan spell at Vitesse came to an end, Castaignos was featured in Sporting CP's pre–season squad. He continued to expect to leave the club over the summer despite making his return. Amid the transfer speculation, Castaignos made his appearance for Sporting CP in over a year, coming on as a late substitute, in a 1–1 draw against rivals, Benfica on 25 August 2018. Eventually, he ended up staying at the club when the transfer window closed. Following this, Castaignos continued to find his first team opportunities limited and was placed on the substitute bench. He went on to make three appearances for the club in the 2018–19 season. It was announced on 19 February 2019 that Castaignos left Sporting CP by mutual consent after months of speculation over his future at the club. It was reported in the Portuguese media that Castaignos cost Sporting CP10,000 euros for every minute he played in the competition.

==== Vitesse (loan) ====
On 7 August 2017, Castaignos returned to the Netherlands to join Vitesse on a season-long loan. It came after when Sporting CP expected the player to leave in the summer.

He made his debut for the club, coming on as a 78th-minute substitute, in a 4–1 win against NAC Breda in the opening game of the season. Since joining Vitesse, Castaignos found his playing time, coming on from the substitute bench and competed with Tim Matavž over the first choice striker role. He spoke out about his place in the first team, saying: "I had to be patient, waited a long time. But everything is happening as it should happen. In moments like this I have to take my chance." Castaignos then scored his first goal for the club, in a 3–0 win against Excelsior on 9 September 2017. However, he suffered a concussion in a match against Zulte Waregem in the UEFA Europa League match on 2 November 2017 and was substituted in the 35th minute, as the club lost 2–0. After missing one match, Castaignos returned to the first team from injury, coming on as an 83rd-minute substitute, in a 4–2 loss against FC Groningen on 19 November 2017. Three weeks later on 7 December 2017, he scored his second goal for Vitesse, in a 1–0 win against OGC Nice in the UEFA Europa League Group Stage. After going two months without scoring, Castaignos finally scored his third goal for the club, in a 2–1 loss against Excelsior on 17 February 2018. He played in both legs of the play-off against FC Utrecht and helped Vitesse win 5–3 on aggregate to qualify for the UEFA Europa League next season. At the end of the 2017–18 season, Castaignos went on to make 36 appearances and scoring three times in all competitions. Following this, he returned to his parent club.

=== Gyeongnam FC ===
On 20 February 2019, Castaignos officially joined South Korean K League 1 football club Gyeongnam FC. Upon joining the club, he said: "I am delighted to be joining Gyeongnam. I am looking forward to living in Gyeongnam, and I want to meet the fans at the stadium as soon as possible. "

Castaignos made his debut for the club, coming on as a 62nd-minute substitute, in a 2–1 win against Seongnam in the opening game of the season. In a follow–up match against Shandong Luneng in the AFC Champions League, he set up a goal for Kim Seung-jun, in a 2–2 draw. However, Castaignos suffered a knee injury and was substituted at half time, as Gyeongnam won 2–1 against Daegu on 30 March 2019. As a result, he was sidelined for two months. Castaignos made his return from injury against Johor Darul Ta'zim on 22 May 2019 and scored his first goal for the club, in a 2–0 win. After missing a match due to being given a personal leave, he scored two goals in two matches between 15 June 2019 and 22 June 2019 against Seongnam and Incheon United. After suffering another injury, Castaignos then scored his fourth goal for Gyeongnam, in a 2–2 draw against Jeju United on 22 July 2019. Despite the injuries, he continued to remain involved in the first team throughout the 2019 season. However, the club ended up relegated to K League 2 after losing 2–0 to Busan IPark on aggregate on 8 December 2019. At the end of the 2019 season, Castaignos made 26 appearances and scoring four times in all competitions.

However, the 2020 season was pushed back to May because of the pandemic. He also stayed at Gyeongnam despite the club's relegation. Castaignos made his first appearance of the season, coming on as 78th-minute substitute, in a 0–0 draw against Ansan Greeners on 20 July 2020. In a follow–up match against Jeonnam Dragons, he scored his first goal of the season, in a 1–1 draw. Castaignos scored his second goal of the season, in a 3–3 draw against Jeju United on 5 September 2020, in what turned out to be his last appearance for Gyeongnam. On 21 September 2020, the club announced that they have terminated his contract by mutual consent, with manager Seol Ki-hyeon claiming that the player fell out with the management. By the time he departed from Gyeongnam, Castaignos made eight appearances and scoring two times in all competitions.

=== OFI ===
On 21 January 2021, Castaignos agreed a move to Greek club OFI. The move was confirmed on 25 January 2021, with the player signed a two–year contract, keeping him until 2023. Upon joining the club, he said: "I was surprised by the way I played with total football."

Castaignos made his debut for OFI, coming on as an 82nd-minute substitute, in a 2–0 loss against AEK Athens on 31 January 2021. He then scored his first goal for the club, in a 2–1 loss against Volos two weeks later on 14 February 2021. However, Castaignos suffered a leg injury that saw him sidelined between four and six weeks. But he made his return from injury, coming on as a second-half substitute, in a 2–2 draw against Panetolikos in the last game of the season. At the end of the 2020–21 season, Castaignos made eight appearances and scoring once in all competitions.

=== 1. FC Magdeburg ===
Castaignos joined 2. Bundesliga club 1. FC Magdeburg as a free agent in January 2023, after a trial. He left Magdeburg at the end of the 2023–24 season.

== International career ==
Castaignos is eligible to play for France through his parents and Netherlands through his place of birth, but he opted to play for Netherlands.

=== Early youth career ===
In September 2008, Castaignos was called up to the Netherlands U17 for the first time when he was fifteen years old and made his first international appearance on 18 September 2008 in a friendly match of the Netherlands U17, in a 0–0 draw against Spain U17. In a follow–up match against Germany U17 on 25 September 2008, Castaignos scored his first goal for the U17 national team, in a 2–1 win. Two weeks later on 8 October 2008, he scored his second goal for Netherlands U17, in a 2–0 win against Poland U17. Castaignos scored his first brace in his U17 national team, in a 2–2 draw against Norway U17 on 8 February 2009. He added four more goals throughout the UEFA European Under-17 Championship elite round, including a brace against Luxembourg U17 on 21 March 2009.

In April 2009, Castaignos was called up to the Netherlands U17 squad for the UEFA European Under-17 Football Championship in Germany. He played his first match of the tournament, starting the whole game, in a 1–1 draw against England U17 on 6 May 2009. Three days later on 9 May 2009, Castaignos scored his first goal of the tournament, in a 2–1 win against Turkey U17. He scored his second goal of the tournament, in the semi–finals of the UEFA European Under-17 Football Championship, in a 2–1 win against Switzerland U17 to reach the final. In the final against Germany U17, Castaignos scored the opening goal of the game, as the Dutch team, aided by a strong contingent of seven Feyenoord players in the squad, finished second after losing 2–1 the final to in extra-time. For his performance in tournament, he was considered one of the key players in the team, picked up the tournament's top scorer award alongside Lennart Thy and was mentioned in the team of the tournament.

Castaignos' international fame started to rise after the 2009 UEFA European Under-17 Football Championship in Germany and was called up to the Netherlands U17 squad for the FIFA U-17 World Cup in Nigeria. He scored his first goal in the tournament, in a 2–1 win against Gambia U17 on 28 October 2009. Castaignos played all three matches in the tournament, as he was unable to help the U17 national team reach further in the FIFA U-17 World Cup. With 13 goals, Castaignos is the all-time top scorer of the Netherlands U17.

=== Netherlands U19 ===
In February 2010, Castaignos was called up to the Netherlands U19 for the first time. He made his debut for the U19 national team, starting a match and 73 minutes before being substituted, in a 1–1 win against England U19 on 2 March 2010. On 20 May 2010, Castaignos scored his first Netherlands U19 goals, in a 2–0 win against Poland U19.

In July 2010, Castaignos was called up to the UEFA European Under-19 Championship in France. He played all three matches, as the U19 national team were eliminated in the group stage. Castaignos scored another brace for Netherlands U19, in a 2–2 draw against Germany U19 on 3 September 2010. A month later on 9 October 2010, he scored his third brace for the U19 national team, in a 3–0 win against Malta U19. Castaignos later scored two more goals for Netherlands U19.

=== Netherlands U21 ===
In August 2011, Castaignos was called up to the Netherlands U21 squad for the first time. He made his U21 national team debut, starting the whole game, in a 3–0 loss against Sweden U21 on 10 August 2011. Castaignos made two more appearances for the Netherlands U21 by the end of the year. In February 2012, he was called up to the Netherlands U20 for the first time. Castaignos made his U20 national team debut, starting a match and played 70 minutes before being substituted, in a 3–0 win against Denmark U21 on 29 February 2012.

After a year absence, Castaignos was called up to the Netherlands U21 squad for the first time on 31 July 2013. He made his first appearances for the U21 national team in over a year, coming on as a second-half substitute, in a 1–0 loss against Czech Republic U21 on 14 August 2013. Castaignos scored his first goal for Netherlands U21 and setting up one of the goals, in a 4–0 win against Scotland U21 on 5 September 2013. A month later on 10 October 2013, he scored a hat–trick and set up two goals, in a 6–0 win against Georgia U21. A month later on 14 November 2013, Castaignos scored his fourth goal for U21 national team, in a 2–2 draw against Slovakia U21. On 3 June 2014, he scored his fifth goal for Netherlands U21, in a 3–1 win against Luxembourg U21. Castaignos then made three more appearances for the U21 national team by the time he was 22 years old. Castaignos made fifteen appearances and scoring six times for the Netherlands U21.

== Playing style ==
Castaignos' playing style led the media to compare him to Thierry Henry. However, he received criticism from the Netherlands media failing to live up to his potential, as well as, his performance.

Former Feyenoord striker Roy Makaay said about the player, saying: "He has an awful lot of qualities, but also shortcomings. The great thing is that he sees that himself. A good quality. Initially, Luc could only stand on his left leg, but recently he has already developed in that area. More is expected of him than is realistic with his age. That applies to more guys at Feyenoord and that creates enormous pressure. Then things are not going well, the results are not really good and that pressure will only increase. He has a lot of qualities, but also shortcomings. The good thing is that he sees it himself. A good feature. Initially Luc could only stand on his left leg, but lately he has already developed in that area." Then Feyenoord manager Mario Been said about Castaignos, saying: "He is getting better and better, I am actually only waiting for a goal. I will just let Luc be in the front line for the coming period. If he makes a few, he can do so enormously help out. Luc fends off in the duels with big defenders, uses his body better and better. He clearly has the qualities for it."

Castaignos spoke about his physical appearance in his early Feyenoord's career, saying: "You demand a lot from your body in such a football year. I notice at the top how important it is to have strength.Especially since I am not yet fully grown due to my age and still have to gain a few kilos of muscle strength. That is where my gains are in the coming seasons. I already notice that I have become stronger. At the beginning of the competition I was pushed away more easily then now." Manager Been said: "We only had Luc as a deep striker. Now he can handle it physically well. He's getting stronger and holding his own." Manager Steve McClaren said about the Castaignos, saying: "Luc Castaignos is also doing well. We like what we see of him in training, he is a real striker who wants to score continuously. He is working on his fitness and needs some time."

Regarding his failed spell at Inter Milan, former Feyenoord striker Pierre van Hooijdonk said: "The problem with Luc Castaignos is that people see him as a player who comes from Inter. And that is not right, because that is not his shoe size. You have to judge him as a Feyenoord player and not with an Inter shirt on, because that has never been his level. The problem with Castaignos is that he doesn't score enough at the moment. If that is the case, other things are looked at and a striker is criticized for his playing football. You never hear that about a striker who has twenty in it." Makkay also said about the striker's time in Italy: "I cannot judge what he did in Italy that year. But he has hardly played. And for a young player it is of course important to play many matches. On the other hand, he was able to train at a high level at Internazionale."

Then Eintracht Frankfurt Manager Armin Veh said: "He can combine, play as a second tip or come over the left wing. We are very variable there", while manager Gertjan Verbeek called him "a second striker".

== Personal life ==
In March 2011, Castaignos and his then teammate Ron Vlaar took part in a spinning marathon for the charity, Stichting Luna Sluiter Foundation.

Upon joining Inter Milan, he began learning Italian. Growing up, Castaignos said he idolised Samuel Eto'o. In January 2014, Castaignos got his wisdom tooth removed and missed FC Twente's pre–season winter for three days.

== Career statistics ==
Appearances and goals by club, season and competition
Club	Season	League			National cup		League cup		Continental		Other		Total	
Club	Season	Division	Apps	Goals	Apps	Goals	Apps	Goals	Apps	Goals	Apps	Goals	Apps	Goals
Feyenoord	2009–10	Eredivisie	3	0	2	0	—		—		—		5	0
Feyenoord	2010–11	Eredivisie	34	15	1	0	—		2 (Note: Appearance(s) in UEFA Europa League)	0	—		37	15
Feyenoord	Total		37	15	3	0	—		2	0	—		42	15
Inter Milan	2011–12	Serie A	6	1	1	0	—		0	0	1 (Note: Appearance(s) in Supercoppa Italiana)	0	8	1
Twente	2012–13	Eredivisie	34	13	2	1	—		8	0	—		44	14
Twente	2013–14	Eredivisie	31	14	0	0	—		—		—		31	14
Twente	2014–15	Eredivisie	29	10	4	3	—		2	1	—		35	14
Twente	Total		94	37	6	4	—		10	1	—		110	42
Eintracht Frankfurt	2015–16	Bundesliga	19	4	1	1	—		—		1 (Note: Appearance(s) in Bundesliga relegation play-offs)	0	21	5
Eintracht Frankfurt	2016–17	Bundesliga	—		1	0	—		—		—		1	0
Eintracht Frankfurt	Total		19	4	2	1	—		—		1	0	22	5
Sporting CP	2016–17	Primeira Liga	6	0	3	0	3	0	1 (Note: Appearance(s) in UEFA Champions League)	0	—		13	0
Sporting CP	2018–19	Primeira Liga	3	0	1	0	0	0	0	0	—		4	0
Sporting CP	Total		9	0	4	0	3	0	1	0	—		17	0
Vitesse (loan)	2017–18	Eredivisie	29	2	1	0	—		5	1	2 (Note: Appearance(s) in Eredivisie European play-offs)	0	37	3
Gyeongnam FC	2019	K League 1	22	3	1	0	—		3 (Note: Appearance(s) in AFC Champions League)	1	—		26	4
Gyeongnam FC	2020	K League 2	8	2	0	0	—		—		—		8	2
Gyeongnam FC	Total		30	5	1	0	—		3	1	—		34	6
OFI	2020–21	Super League Greece	8	1	1	0	—		—		—		9	1
OFI	2021–22	Super League Greece	12	0	3	2	—		—		—		15	2
OFI	Total		20	1	4	2	—		—		—		24	3
1. FC Magdeburg	2022–23	2. Bundesliga	7	1	0	0	—		—		—		7	1
1. FC Magdeburg	2023–24	2. Bundesliga	19	4	1	0	—		—		—		20	4
1. FC Magdeburg	Total		26	5	0	0	—		—		—		27	5
Career total			270	70	23	7	3	0	21	3	4	0	321	80

== Honours ==
Sporting CP

- Taça de Portugal: 2018–19
