= Amara Condé =

German-Guinean footballer (born 1997)

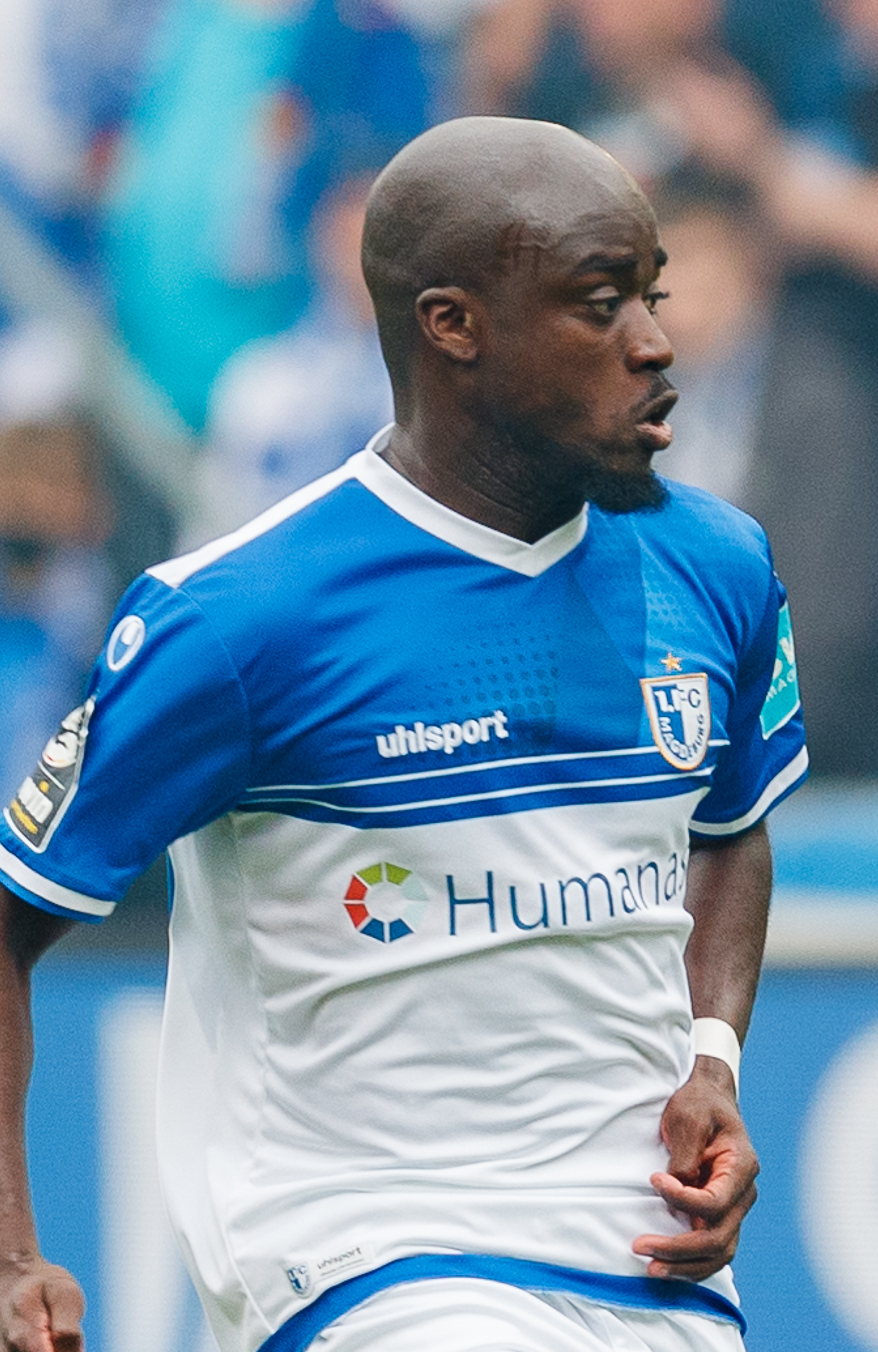
- Condé with 1. FC Magdeburg in 2022

Personal information
- Date of birth: 6 January 1997 (age 29)
- Place of birth: Freiberg, Germany
- Height: 1.73 m (5 ft 8 in)
- Position: Midfielder

Team information
- Current team: SV Elversberg
- Number: 6

Youth career
- –2006: SC 27 Bergisch Gladbach
- 2006–2012: Bayer Leverkusen
- 2012–2016: VfL Wolfsburg

Senior career*
Years	Team	Apps	(Gls)
2016–2019	VfL Wolfsburg II	38	(0)
2017–2018	→ Holstein Kiel (loan)	6	(0)
2019–2021	Rot-Weiss Essen	58	(4)
2021–2024	1. FC Magdeburg	95	(9)
2024–2025	Heerenveen	15	(0)
2025–	SV Elversberg	34	(1)

International career
2011–2012	Germany U15	4	(0)
2012–2013	Germany U16	2	(0)
2014–2015	Germany U18	5	(0)
2015–2016	Germany U19	10	(1)
2016–2017	Germany U20	12	(0)
- * Club domestic league appearances and goals as of 17 October 2026

Amara Condé (born 6 January 1997) is a professional footballer who plays as a midfielder for Bundesliga club SV Elversberg. Born in Germany, he represents the Guinea national team.

== Club career ==
On 11 July 2024, Condé signed a contract with Heerenveen in the Netherlands for two seasons with an option for a third season.

On 30 June 2025, Condé moved to SV Elversberg on a three-year contract.

== International career ==
Born in Germany to Guinean parents, Condé was a youth international for Germany, having appeared at under-15, under-16, under-18, under-19 and under-20 level.

On 26 February 2026, Condé's request to his switch international allegiance to Guinea was approved by FIFA.

== Career statistics ==
As of match played 27 October 2026

Appearances and goals by club, season and competition
Club	Season	League			National cup (Note: Includes DFB-Pokal, KNVB Cup)		Europe		Other		Total	
Club	Season	Division	Apps	Goals	Apps	Goals	Apps	Goals	Apps	Goals	Apps	Goals
VfL Wolfsburg II	2016–17	Regionalliga Nord	24	0	—		—		—		24	0
VfL Wolfsburg II	2018–19	Regionalliga Nord	14	0	—		—		2 (Note: Appearances in Regionalliga promotion play-offs)	0	17	0
VfL Wolfsburg II	Total		38	0	—		—		2	0	40	0
Holstein Kiel (loan)	2017–18	2. Bundesliga	6	0	2	0	—		—		8	0
Rot-Weiss Essen	2019–20	Regionalliga West	25	2	0	0	—		3 (Note: Appearances in Lower Rhine Cup)	0	28	2
Rot-Weiss Essen	2020–21	Regionalliga West	33	2	3	0	—		3	0	39	2
Rot-Weiss Essen	Total		58	4	3	0	—		6	0	67	4
1. FC Magdeburg	2021–22	3. Liga	37	5	1	0	—		3 (Note: Appearances in Saxony-Anhalt Cup)	0	41	5
1. FC Magdeburg	2022–23	2. Bundesliga	29	3	1	0	—		—		30	3
1. FC Magdeburg	2023–24	2. Bundesliga	29	1	3	0	—		—		32	1
1. FC Magdeburg	Total		95	9	5	0	—		3	0	103	9
Heerenveen	2024–25	Eredivisie	15	0	3	0	—		—		18	0
SV Elversberg	2025–26	2. Bundesliga	31	1	2	0	—		—		33	1
SV Elversberg	2026–27	Bundesliga	3	0	2	0	—		—		5	0
SV Elversberg	Total		34	1	4	0	—		—		38	1
Career total			246	14	17	0	0	0	11	0	274	14
