= Moritz Kwarteng =

German footballer (born 1998)

Personal information
- Full name: Moritz-Broni Kwarteng
- Date of birth: 28 April 1998 (age 28)
- Place of birth: Stuttgart, Germany
- Height: 1.75 m (5 ft 9 in)
- Position: Midfielder

Team information
- Current team: 1. FC Magdeburg
- Number: 10

Youth career
- ASV Botnang
- –2013: VfB Stuttgart
- 2013–2015: RB Leipzig
- 2015–2017: 1899 Hoffenheim

Senior career*
Years	Team	Apps	(Gls)
2017–2021	Hamburger SV II	69	(14)
2018–2021	Hamburger SV	3	(0)
2022–2023	1. FC Magdeburg	40	(12)
2023–2026	VfL Bochum	36	(2)
2025	→ Fortuna Düsseldorf (loan)	8	(0)
2026–	1. FC Magdeburg	0	(0)
- * Club domestic league appearances and goals as of 18 May 2026

Moritz-Broni Kwarteng (born 28 April 1998) is a German professional footballer who plays as a midfielder for 2. Bundesliga club 1. FC Magdeburg.

== Career ==
In May 2018, Kwarteng signed his first professional contract with Hamburger SV, lasting for three years until 30 June 2021. He made his professional debut for Hamburg in the 2. Bundesliga on 10 May 2021, coming on as a substitute in the 82nd minute for David Kinsombi against 1. FC Nürnberg. The home match finished as a 5–2 win for Hamburg.

On 21 January 2022, Kwarteng signed with 1. FC Magdeburg.

On 22 June 2023, Kwarteng moved to Bundesliga club VfL Bochum. He signed a contract until 30 June 2027.

On 13 January 2025, Kwarteng joined Fortuna Düsseldorf on loan, with an option to buy.

On 7 July 2026, he returned to 1. FC Magdeburg.

== Personal life ==
Kwarteng was born in Stuttgart, Baden-Württemberg and is of Ghanaian descent.

== Career statistics ==
As of match played 9 May 2026

Appearances and goals by club, season and competition
Club	Season	League			DFB-Pokal		Other		Total	
Club	Season	Division	Apps	Goals	Apps	Goals	Apps	Goals	Apps	Goals
Hamburger SV II	2017–18	Regionalliga Nord	23	3	—		—		23	3
Hamburger SV II	2018–19	Regionalliga Nord	27	5	—		—		27	5
Hamburger SV II	2019–20	Regionalliga Nord	9	2	—		—		9	2
Hamburger SV II	2020–21	Regionalliga Nord	10	4	—		—		10	4
Hamburger SV II	Total		69	14	—		—		69	14
Hamburger SV	2020–21	2. Bundesliga	3	0	0	0	—		3	0
1. FC Magdeburg	2021–22	3. Liga	11	2	1	0	0	0	12	2
1. FC Magdeburg	2022–23	2. Bundesliga	29	10	0	0	—		29	10
1. FC Magdeburg	Total		40	12	1	0	—		41	12
VfL Bochum	2023–24	Bundesliga	11	0	0	0	0	0	11	0
VfL Bochum	2024–25	Bundesliga	7	0	0	0	0	0	7	0
VfL Bochum	2025–26	2. Bundesliga	17	0	2	0	—		19	0
VfL Bochum	Total		35	0	2	0	0	0	37	0
Career total			147	26	3	0	0	0	150	26
