= Maximilian Franzke =

German footballer

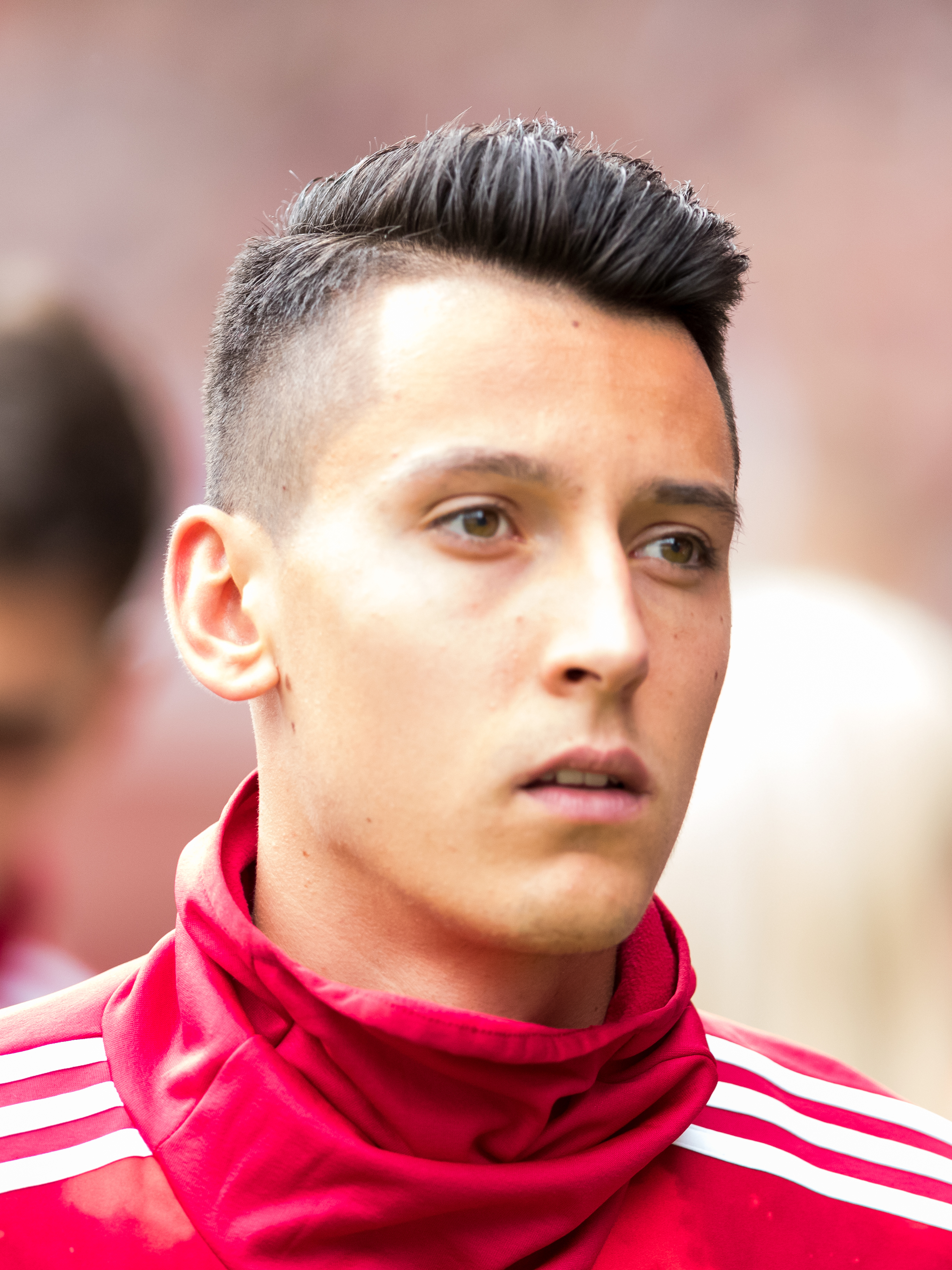
- Franzke with Bayern Munich II in 2019

Personal information
- Date of birth: 5 March 1999 (age 27)
- Place of birth: Munich, Germany
- Height: 1.84 m (6 ft 0 in)
- Position: Winger

Youth career
- 2006–2009: SC Baierbrunn
- 2009–2010: 1860 Munich
- 2010–2019: Bayern Munich

Senior career*
Years	Team	Apps	(Gls)
2017–2020	Bayern Munich II	27	(3)
2020–2021	FC St. Pauli	5	(0)
2020	FC St. Pauli II	5	(0)
2020–2021	→ 1. FC Magdeburg (loan)	8	(1)
2021–2023	1. FC Magdeburg	8	(0)
- * Club domestic league appearances and goals as of 5 July 2023

Maximilian Franzke (born 5 March 1999) is a German professional footballer who plays as a winger.

== Career ==
Franzke joined FC St. Pauli in January 2020.

He signed for 3. Liga side 1. FC Magdeburg on loan in October 2020.

In summer 2021, he signed for 1. FC Magdeburg permanently on a contract of undisclosed length.

== Career statistics ==
As of match played 1 July 2022

Appearances and goals by club, season and competition
Club	Season	League			National cup		Other		Total	
Club	Season	Division	Apps	Goals	Apps	Goals	Apps	Goals	Apps	Goals
Bayern Munich II	2017–18	Regionalliga Bayern	1	0	—		0	0	1	0
Bayern Munich II	2018–19	Regionalliga Bayern	25	3	—		0	0	25	3
Bayern Munich II	2019–20	3. Liga	1	0	—		0	0	1	0
Bayern Munich II	Total		27	3	0	0	0	0	27	3
FC St. Pauli II	2019–20	Regionalliga Nord	2	0	—		0	0	2	0
FC St. Pauli II	2020–21	Regionalliga Nord	3	0	—		0	0	3	0
FC St. Pauli II	Total		5	0	0	0	0	0	5	0
FC St. Pauli	2019–20	2. Bundesliga	5	0	0	0	0	0	5	0
FC St. Pauli	2020–21	2. Bundesliga	0	0	0	0	0	0	0	0
FC St. Pauli	Total		5	0	0	0	0	0	5	0
1. FC Magdeburg (loan)	2020–21	3. Liga	8	1	0	0	0	0	8	1
1. FC Magdeburg	2021–22	3. Liga	8	0	0	0	0	0	8	0
Career total			53	4	0	0	0	0	53	4
