= Barış Atik =

Turkish footballer (born 1995)

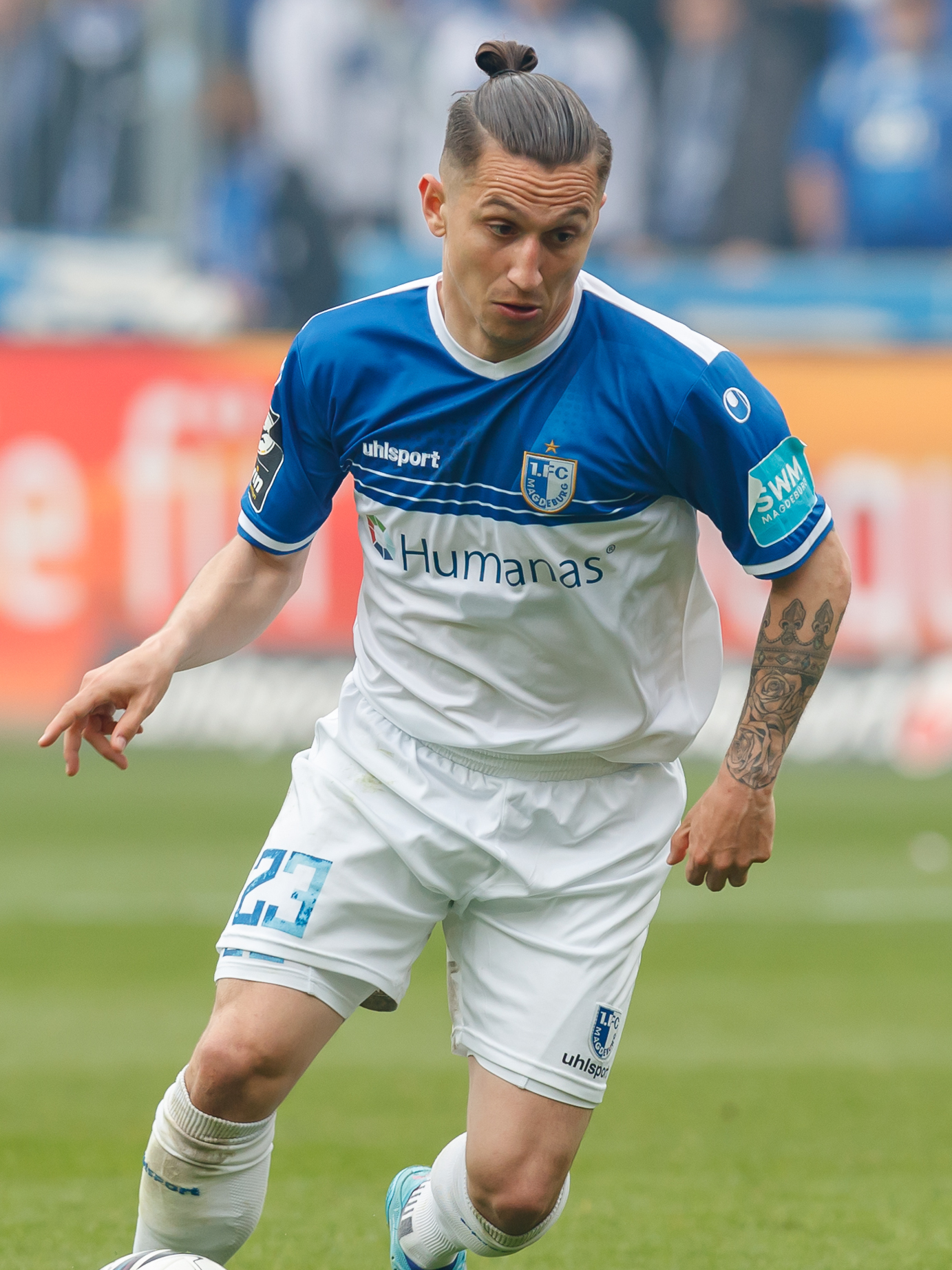
- Atik with 1. FC Magdeburg in 2022

Personal information
- Full name: Barış-Fahri Atik
- Date of birth: 9 January 1995 (age 31)
- Place of birth: Frankenthal, Germany
- Height: 1.69 m (5 ft 7 in)
- Position: Attacking midfielder

Team information
- Current team: 1. FC Magdeburg
- Number: 23

Youth career
- VT Frankenthal
- –2012: Waldhof Mannheim
- 2012–2014: 1899 Hoffenheim

Senior career*
Years	Team	Apps	(Gls)
2013–2016	1899 Hoffenheim II	74	(18)
2016–2018	1899 Hoffenheim	3	(0)
2017	→ Sturm Graz (loan)	16	(5)
2017–2018	→ 1. FC Kaiserslautern (loan)	12	(0)
2018	→ Darmstadt 98 (loan)	5	(0)
2018–2020	Dynamo Dresden	49	(6)
2021–	1. FC Magdeburg	168	(51)

International career
2013	Turkey U18	2	(1)
2013	Turkey U19	1	(0)
- * Club domestic league appearances and goals as of 18 May 2026

Barış-Fahri Atik (born 9 January 1995) is a professional footballer who plays as an attacking midfielder for 1. FC Magdeburg. Born in Germany, he has represented Turkey at youth level.

== International career ==
Atik was born in Germany to parents of Turkish descent. He was a youth international for Turkey at the U18 and 19 levels.

== Career statistics ==
As of match played 1 July 2022

Appearances and goals by club, season and competition
Club	Season	League			National Cup		Other		Total	
Club	Season	Division	Apps	Goals	Apps	Goals	Apps	Goals	Apps	Goals
1899 Hoffenheim II	2012–13	Regionalliga Südwest	2	1	—		—		2	1
1899 Hoffenheim II	2013–14	Regionalliga Südwest	3	0	—		—		3	0
1899 Hoffenheim II	2014–15	Regionalliga Südwest	29	4	—		—		29	4
1899 Hoffenheim II	2015–16	Regionalliga Südwest	24	3	—		—		24	3
1899 Hoffenheim II	2016–17	Regionalliga Südwest	16	10	—		—		16	10
1899 Hoffenheim II	Total		74	18	—		—		74	18
1899 Hoffenheim	2016–17	Bundesliga	3	0	0	0	—		3	0
Sturm Graz (loan)	2016–17	Austrian Bundesliga	16	5	0	0	—		16	5
1. FC Kaiserslautern (loan)	2017–18	2. Bundesliga	12	0	2	1	—		14	1
Darmstadt 98 (loan)	2017–18	2. Bundesliga	5	0	—		—		5	0
Dynamo Dresden	2018–19	2. Bundesliga	27	6	0	0	—		27	6
Dynamo Dresden	2019–20	2. Bundesliga	22	0	2	0	—		24	0
Dynamo Dresden	Total		49	6	2	0	—		51	6
1. FC Magdeburg	2020–21	3. Liga	15	7	0	0	—		15	7
1. FC Magdeburg	2021–22	3. Liga	35	19	1	0	—		36	19
1. FC Magdeburg	Total		50	26	1	0	—		51	26
Career total			209	55	5	1	0	0	214	56
