= Julian Rieckmann =

German footballer

Personal information
- Date of birth: 1 August 2000 (age 26)
- Place of birth: Winsen, Germany
- Height: 1.86 m (6 ft 1 in)
- Position: Defender

Team information
- Current team: Waldhof Mannheim
- Number: 21

Youth career
- 2003–2007: SG Elbdeich
- 2013–2018: Werder Bremen

Senior career*
Years	Team	Apps	(Gls)
2018–2021	Werder Bremen II	52	(1)
2021–2023	1. FC Magdeburg	24	(1)
2023–	Waldhof Mannheim	95	(6)

International career^{‡}
2015–2016	Germany U16	5	(0)
2016	Germany U17	3	(0)
2018	Germany U19	1	(0)
- * Club domestic league appearances and goals as of 29 May 2026 ‡ National team caps and goals as of 22:34, 14 August 2021 (UTC)

Julian Rieckmann (born 1 August 2000) is a German professional footballer who plays as a defender for Waldhof Mannheim.

After playing youth football for SG Elbdeich and Werder Bremen, he made his senior debut for Werder Bremen II in 2018 and went on to make 52 appearances for Werder Bremen II across a three-year spell. He joined 3. Liga side 1. FC Magdeburg in summer 2021, and was promoted to the 2. Bundesliga with them in his debut season at the club. He joined current club Waldhof Mannheim in summer 2023.

== Club career ==
=== Early career ===
Born in Winsen, Rieckmann started his youth career at SG Elbdeich before joining Werder Bremen in 2013. He extended his contract with the club in March 2018, with the contract set to become professional upon his 18th birthday. He made his senior debut for Werder Bremen II on 28 July 2018 in a 0–0 draw with VfL Wolfsburg II. Over three seasons, Rieckmann made 52 appearances for Werder Bremen II and scored once.

=== 1. FC Magdeburg ===
In June 2021, Rieckmann joined 3. Liga club 1. FC Magdeburg on a contract of undisclosed length. He played 18 times across the 2021–22 season as Magdeburg were promoted to the 2. Bundesliga, but he played just six times for the club during the 2022–23 season before suffering a torn meniscus in April 2023.

=== Waldhof Mannheim ===
Rieckmann moved to Waldhof Mannheim on a free transfer in summer 2023, on a contract of undisclosed length.

He extended his contract with the club in June 2025.

== International career ==
Rieckmann has represented Germany at under-16, under-17 and under-19 levels.
