= Alexander Bittroff =

German footballer (born 1989)

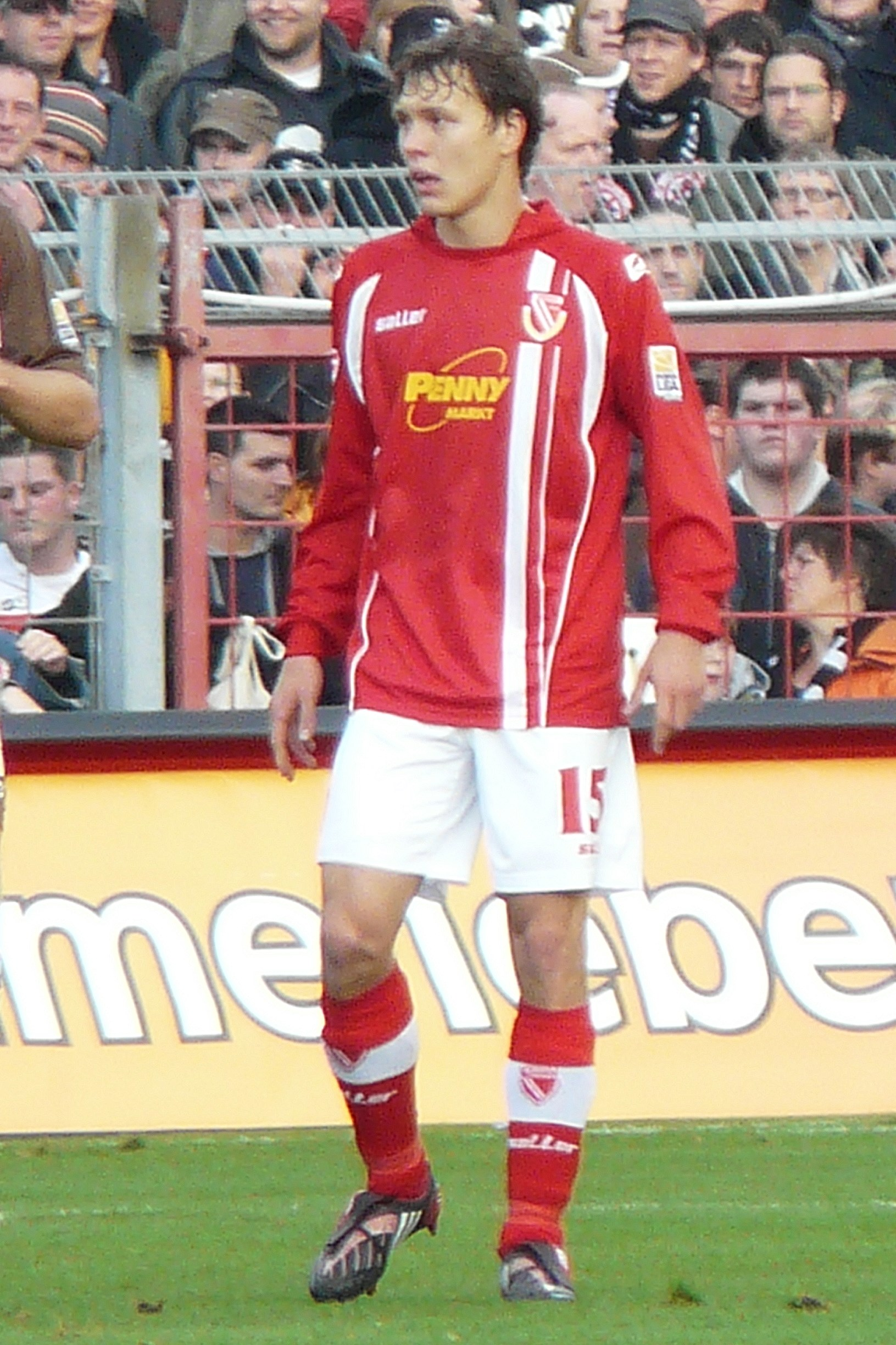
- Bittroff in 2009

Personal information
- Date of birth: 19 September 1989 (age 37)
- Place of birth: Lauchhammer, Bezirk Cottbus, East Germany
- Height: 1.86 m (6 ft 1 in)
- Position: Full-back

Team information
- Current team: VfB Krieschow
- Number: 2

Youth career
- VfB Senftenberg
- FSV Glückauf Brieske-Senftenberg
- 2002–2007: Energie Cottbus

Senior career*
Years	Team	Apps	(Gls)
2007–2011	Energie Cottbus II	50	(1)
2010–2014	Energie Cottbus	132	(4)
2014–2016	FSV Frankfurt	35	(0)
2016–2017	Chemnitzer FC	47	(0)
2017–2020	KFC Uerdingen 05	69	(2)
2020–2023	1. FC Magdeburg	69	(3)
2023–2025	Jahn Regensburg	13	(0)
2025–	VfB Krieschow	1	(0)
- * Club domestic league appearances and goals as of 30 August 2025

Alexander Bittroff (born 19 September 1989) is a German professional footballer who plays as a full-back for NOFV-Oberliga club VfB Krieschow.

He started his career in the 2. Bundesliga with Energie Cottbus, where he made his first team debut in 2009, before transferring to FSV Frankfurt, also of the 2. Bundesliga, in 2014. He had his contract terminated at FSV in January 2016 before signing for 3. Liga club Chemnitzer FC where he remained until summer 2017. He subsequently played for KFC Uerdingen 05, 1. FC Magdeburg and SSV Jahn Regensburg.

== Career ==
=== Energie Cottbus ===
Bittroff was born in Lauchhammer and attended Lausitzer Sportschule Cottbus. Bittroff joined Energie Cottbus' youth team in 2002, having also played youth football for VfB Senftenberg and FSV Glückauf Brieske-Senftenberg. He signed his first professional contract, valid for two years, in May 2008 and first joined the first team for a pre-season training camp later that summer, having made 21 appearances for Energie Cottbus II in the previous season. He played 26 times for Energie II during the 2008–09 season.

He made his 2. Bundesliga debut on 9 August 2009, where he scored and provided an assist in a 3–1 win over FC Augsburg in the club's opening game of the season. He was called up to the Germany national under-21 team in November 2009, after other players pulled out through injury, though he was an unused substitute in their matches against Northern Ireland and San Marino. In December 2009, he signed a new two-and-a-half-year contract with the club, having played 16 times for the first team in the opening half of the 2009–10 season. He suffered a knee injury in January 2010, which limited his game time in the second-half of the season, and he finished the season having made 22 appearances.

Bittroff lost his starting spot in the Cottbus side at the start of the 2010–11 season, with manager Claus-Dieter Wollitz claiming that Bittroff needed to "work his way out of his self-pity" (German: aus seiner Selbstbemitleidung herausfindet) to regain his place in the team in October 2010. He made four substitute appearances in the first nine matches of the season, but started 22 times and made one substitute appearance in the subsequent 25 matches. In February 2012, Bittroff extended his contract with the club until summer 2014. He played 23 times for the club in the 2. Bundesliga across the 2011–12 season.

In March 2013, Bittroff signed a new contract with the club, valid until the end of the 2015–16 season. He was given the club's Player of the Year award for the 2012–13 season, having made 32 2. Bundesliga appearances that season. He played 27 times in the league across the 2013–14 season, as Cottbus finished bottom of the 2. Bundesliga and were relegated to the 3. Liga for the first time in 17 years.

=== FSV Frankfurt ===
Following relegation at the end of the 2013–14 season, he left Cottbus at the expiry of his contract (his contract was not valid for the third tier 3. Liga), and signed a two-year contract with an option for a further year at FSV Frankfurt. He started 32 league matches across the 2014–15 season. Bittroff started the first three league matches of the 2015–16 season, but after a red card three minutes before full time against Karlsruher SC on 14 August, he failed to play for the club again and his contract was terminated in January 2016 to allow him to sign for Chemnitzer FC.

=== Chemnitzer FC ===
On 26 January 2016, Bittroff signed for 3. Liga club Chemnitzer FC on a contract until June 2017. He made his debut for the club on 30 January, starting a 5–2 defeat away to Holstein Kiel before being substituted off at half time, before subsequently playing every remaining minute of the 2015–16 season. He made 30 3. Liga appearances across the 2016–17 season.

=== KFC Uerdingen ===
On 27 June 2017, Bittroff joined KFC Uerdingen 05 on a three-year contract. He was a regular player for the club as they were promoted from the Regionalliga West to the 3. Liga in his first season at the club, with Bittroff having started 32 of a possible 34 games. He was used less regularly during the following season due to competition in his position, and made 11 appearances in total during the 2018–19 season.

He left Uerdingen in August 2020 after his contract was not extended, having played 27 times for the club across the 2019–20 season.

=== 1. FC Magdeburg ===
In October 2020, Bittroff joined 1. FC Magdeburg on a one-year contract. His contract was extended by a further year at the end of the season.

He suffered a torn calf in a 1–0 defeat to Viktoria Köln in October 2021, but he returned in late November.

After promotion to the 2. Bundesliga in the 2021–22 season, Bittroff extended his contract with Magdeburg in May 2022.

=== Jahn Regensburg ===
In June 2023, Bittroff joined Jahn Regensburg on a two-year contract.

He was released in summer 2025, and signed for NOFV-Oberliga Süd club VfB Kreischow in August.

== Personal life ==
Bittroff became a father in October 2022 after his wife Anne gave birth to a boy.

== Career statistics ==
As of end of 2024–25 season

Appearances and goals by club, season and competition
Club	Season	League			DFB-Pokal		Other		Total	
Club	Season	Division	Apps	Goals	Apps	Goals	Apps	Goals	Apps	Goals
Energie Cottbus II	2007–08	Regionalliga Nord	21	0	—		0	0	21	0
Energie Cottbus II	2008–09	Regionalliga Nord	26	1	—		0	0	26	1
Energie Cottbus II	2010–11	Regionalliga Nord	2	0	—		0	0	2	0
Energie Cottbus II	2011–12	Regionalliga Nord	1	0	—		0	0	1	0
Energie Cottbus II	Total		50	1	0	0	0	0	50	1
Energie Cottbus	2009–10	2. Bundesliga	22	2	2	0	0	0	24	2
Energie Cottbus	2010–11	2. Bundesliga	27	0	5	0	0	0	32	0
Energie Cottbus	2011–12	2. Bundesliga	23	0	1	0	0	0	24	0
Energie Cottbus	2012–13	2. Bundesliga	32	1	1	0	0	0	33	1
Energie Cottbus	2013–14	2. Bundesliga	28	1	2	0	0	0	30	1
Energie Cottbus	Total		132	4	11	0	0	0	143	4
FSV Frankfurt	2014–15	2. Bundesliga	32	0	1	0	0	0	33	0
FSV Frankfurt	2015–16	2. Bundesliga	3	0	1	0	0	0	4	0
FSV Frankfurt	Total		35	0	2	0	0	0	37	0
Chemnitzer FC	2015–16	3. Liga	17	0	—		0	0	17	0
Chemnitzer FC	2016–17	3. Liga	30	0	—		0	0	30	0
Chemnitzer FC	Total		47	0	0	0	0	0	47	0
KFC Uerdingen	2017–18	Regionalliga West	32	2	—		2 (Note: Appearance(s) in Regionalliga promotion play-offs.)	0	34	2
KFC Uerdingen	2018–19	3. Liga	11	0	—		0	0	11	0
KFC Uerdingen	2019–20	3. Liga	26	0	1	0	0	0	27	0
KFC Uerdingen	Total		69	2	1	0	2	0	72	2
1. FC Magdeburg	2020–21	3. Liga	26	0	—		0	0	26	0
1. FC Magdeburg	2021–22	3. Liga	28	3	1	0	0	0	29	3
1. FC Magdeburg	2022–23	2. Bundesliga	15	0	0	0	0	0	15	0
1. FC Magdeburg	Total		69	3	1	0	0	0	70	3
Jahn Regensburg	2023–24	3. Liga	10	0	—		1 (Note: Appearance(s) in 2. Bundesliga relegation play-offs)	0	11	0
Jahn Regensburg	2024–25	2. Bundesliga	3	0	2	0	0	0	5	0
Jahn Regensburg	Total		13	0	2	0	1	0	16	0
Career total			415	10	17	0	3	0	435	10
