= Eldin Džogović =

Luxembourgish footballer (born 2003)

Personal information
- Date of birth: 8 June 2003 (age 23)
- Place of birth: Luxembourg City, Luxembourg
- Height: 1.80 m (5 ft 11 in)
- Position: Right-back

Team information
- Current team: 1. FC Magdeburg
- Number: 4

Youth career
- –2014: Union Mertert-Wasserbillig
- 2014–2019: SV Eintracht Trier 05
- 2019–2022: 1. FC Magdeburg

Senior career*
Years	Team	Apps	(Gls)
2022–	1. FC Magdeburg II	86	(15)
2023–	1. FC Magdeburg	9	(0)

International career^{‡}
2018–2019	Luxembourg U16	5	(0)
2018–2019	Luxembourg U17	6	(1)
2021	Luxembourg U19	3	(0)
2020–2022	Luxembourg U21	9	(0)
2021–	Luxembourg	15	(0)
- * Club domestic league appearances and goals as of 23 September 2026 ‡ National team caps and goals as of 16 November 2026

Eldin Džogović (born 8 June 2003) is a Luxembourgish professional footballer who plays as a right-back for German club 1. FC Magdeburg and the Luxembourg national team.

== Career ==
As a youth academy player of 1. FC Magdeburg, Džogović received maiden call-up to Luxembourg senior team in March 2021. He made his senior debut on 24 March 2021 in a 0–1 friendly defeat against Qatar.

== Career statistics ==
=== International ===
As of match played 16 November 2026

Appearances and goals by national team and year
National team	Year	Apps	Goals
Luxembourg	2021	1	0
Luxembourg	2022	0	0
Luxembourg	2023	3	0
Luxembourg	2024	5	0
Luxembourg	2025	4	0
Luxembourg	2026	2	0
Total		15	0
