= Tatsuya Itō (footballer) =

Japanese footballer (born 1997)

Tatsuya Itō 伊藤 達哉
Personal information
- Date of birth: 26 June 1997 (age 29)
- Place of birth: Taitō-ku, Tokyo, Japan
- Height: 1.66 m (5 ft 5 in)
- Position: Forward

Team information
- Current team: Kawasaki Frontale
- Number: 17

Youth career
- 2007–2015: Kashiwa Reysol
- 2015–2016: Hamburger SV

Senior career*
Years	Team	Apps	(Gls)
2016–2019	Hamburger II	32	(2)
2017–2019	Hamburger SV	34	(0)
2019–2023	Sint-Truiden	21	(0)
2022–2023	→ Magdeburg (loan)	49	(8)
2023–2025	Magdeburg	41	(2)
2025–	Kawasaki Frontale	54	(14)

International career^{‡}
2019	Japan U22	3	(0)
- * Club domestic league appearances and goals as of 1 August 2026 ‡ National team caps and goals as of 4 June 2019

Tatsuya Itō (Japanese: 伊藤 達哉; born 26 June 1997) is a Japanese professional footballer who plays as a forward and currently play for J1 League club, Kawasaki Frontale.

== Club career ==
=== Hamburger SV ===
Itō made his Hamburger SV II league debut against Havelse on 31 July 2016. He scored his first league goal against SV Meppen on 30 April 2017, scoring in the 62nd minute.

Itō made his Hamburger SV league debut against Bayer Leverkusen on 24 September 2017.

Itō was nominated for Bundesliga's rookie of the year award 2018.

=== Sint-Truiden ===
On 22 August 2019, he joined Belgian club Sint-Truiden. Itō made his league debut against Genk on 28 September 2019.

=== Loan to FC Magdeburg ===
On 21 January 2022, Itō was loaned to 1. FC Magdeburg in 3. Liga. He scored on his league debut against MSV Duisburg on 26 January 2022, scoring in the 9th minute.

=== FC Magdeburg ===
On 21 June 2023, Itō moved to 1. FC Magdeburg on a permanent contract. He made his league debut against Wehen Wiesbaden on 29 July 2023. Itō scored his first league goal against Wehen Wiesbaden on 21 January 2024, scoring in the 80th minute.

=== Kawasaki Frontale ===
On 10 January 2025, Itō move to Japan and announcement official permanent transfer to J1 club, Kawasaki Frontale for 2025 season. This will be the first season in J.League.

== International career ==
On 30 August 2018, Itō received his first international call-up to the Japan national team for the Kirin Challenge Cup 2018.

On 24 May 2019, Itō was called up by Japan's head coach Hajime Moriyasu to feature in the Copa América, held in Brazil.

== Honours ==
Individual

- J.League Best XI: 2025
