= Leon Bell Bell =

German footballer

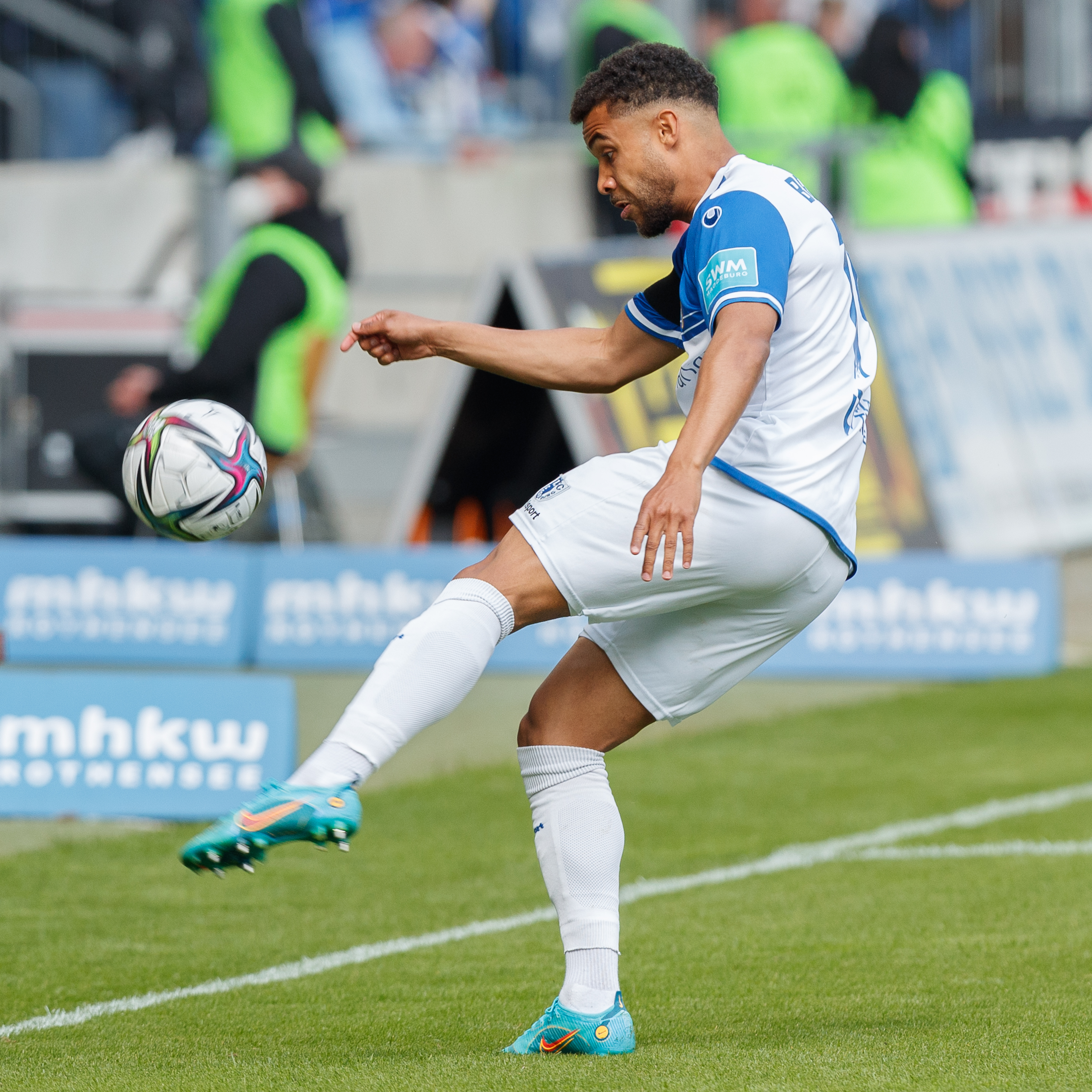
- Bell Bell with 1. FC Magdeburg in 2022

Personal information
- Date of birth: 6 September 1996 (age 30)
- Place of birth: Hanau, Germany
- Height: 1.76 m (5 ft 9 in)
- Positions: Left-back; left midfielder

Youth career
- 2011–2015: 1. FC Kaiserslautern

Senior career*
Years	Team	Apps	(Gls)
2015–2017	1. FC Kaiserslautern II	32	(3)
2017–2018	FSV Frankfurt	33	(8)
2018–2019	Mainz 05 II	29	(4)
2019–2024	1. FC Magdeburg	121	(6)
2024–2026	Eintracht Braunschweig	48	(2)
- * Club domestic league appearances and goals as of 18 May 2026

Leon Bell Bell (born 6 September 1996) is a German professional footballer who plays as a left-back or left midfielder.

== Club career ==
On 6 June 2024, Bell Bell signed a two-year contract with Eintracht Braunschweig.

== Personal life ==
Born in Germany, Bell Bell is of Cameroonian descent.
