= 2025–26 1. FC Magdeburg season =

German Association football club season

1. FC Magdeburg
2025–26 season
- Manager: Markus Fiedler (until 12 October); Petrik Sander / Pascal Ibold (from 12 October)
- Stadium: Avnet Arena
- 2. Bundesliga: 14th
- DFB-Pokal: Round of 16
- Top goalscorer: League: Mateusz Żukowski (17); All: Mateusz Żukowski (17)
- Highest home attendance: 28,875 v. 1. FC Kaiserslautern
- Lowest home attendance: 18,488 v. SV Darmstadt 98
- Average home league attendance: 25,084
- Biggest win: 1. FC Magdeburg 4–1 VfL Bochum
- Biggest defeat: 1. FC Magdeburg 0–4 SV Elversberg
Home colours	Away colours	Third colours

The 2025–26 season was the 60th season in the history of 1. FC Magdeburg, and their fourth consecutive season in the 2. Bundesliga. In addition to the domestic league, the club participated in the DFB-Pokal.

== Players ==
As of 15 February 2026

Note: Flags indicate national team as defined under FIFA eligibility rules; some limited exceptions apply. Players may hold more than one non-FIFA nationality.

No.	Pos.	Nation	Player
1	GK	GER	Dominik Reimann (captain)
2	DF	FRA	Samuel Loric
4	DF	LUX	Eldin Džogović
5	DF	GER	Tobias Müller
6	MF	POL	Dariusz Stalmach
7	DF	UGA	Herbert Bockhorn
8	MF	GER	Laurin Ulrich (on loan from VfB Stuttgart)
9	FW	GER	Maximilian Breunig (on loan from 1. FC Heidenheim)
10	FW	CRO	Noah Pesch (on loan from Borussia Mönchengladbach)
11	FW	SWE	Alexander Ahl Holmström
13	MF	GER	Connor Krempicki
15	DF	GER	Daniel Heber
16	DF	DEN	Marcus Mathisen
17	FW	GER	Alexander Nollenberger
19	DF	ZAM	Lubambo Musonda

No.	Pos.	Nation	Player
20	MF	GER	Nick Meier
21	MF	GER	Falko Michel
22	FW	POL	Mateusz Żukowski
23	FW	TUR	Barış Atik
24	DF	FRA	Jean Hugonet
25	MF	CIV	Silas Gnaka
26	FW	MNE	Aleksa Marušić
27	DF	GER	Philipp Hercher
28	DF	GER	Max Geschwill (on loan from Holstein Kiel)
29	MF	FRA	Rayan Ghrieb
30	GK	GER	Noah Kruth
31	MF	GER	Robert Leipertz
34	DF	GER	Tarek Chahed
35	MF	GER	Magnus Baars
38	MF	FIN	Luka Hyryläinen
40	GK	GER	Robert Kampa

== Transfers ==
=== In ===
Pos.	Player	Transferred from	Fee	Date	Source
MF	(Germany) Laurin Ulrich	(Germany) VfB Stuttgart	loan	30 June 2025	
MF	(Germany) Nick-Elias Meier	(Germany) Hannover 96		30 June 2025	
FW	(Montenegro) Aleksa Marusic	(Moldova) Sheriff Tiraspol	loan return	30 June 2025	
MF	(Germany) Robert Leipertz	(Germany) SSV Ulm 1846	loan return	30 June 2025	
DF	(Kosovo) Andi Hoti	(Germany) Dynamo Dresden	loan return	30 June 2025	
MF	(Germany) Noah Pesch	(Germany) Borussia Mönchengladbach	loan	27 July 2025	
FW	(France) Rayan Ghrieb	(France) EA Guingamp		7 August 2025	
FW	(Guinea) Kandet Diawara	(France) Le Havre AC		7 August 2025	
FW	(Germany) Max Geschwill	(Germany) Holstein Kiel	loan	14 August 2025	
MF	(Finland) Luka Hyryläinen	(Germany) TSG Hoffenheim		19 August 2025	
FW	(Japan) Ado Onaiwu	(France) AJ Auxerre		1 September 2025	
FW	(Poland) Mateusz Zukowski	(Poland) Śląsk Wrocław		1 September 2025	
FW	(Germany) Maximilian Breunig	(Germany) 1. FC Heidenheim	loan	1 September 2025	

=== Out ===
Pos.	Player	Transferred to	Fee	Date	Source
FW	(England) Xavier Amaechi	(England) Plymouth Argyle	End of contract	30 June 2025	
DF	(Netherlands) Mohammed El Hankouri	(Belgium) Standard Lüttich	End of contract	30 June 2025	
FW	(Turkey) Livan Burcu	(Germany) 1. FC Union Berlin	loan return	30 June 2025	
FW	(Germany) Jason Ceka	(Germany) SV Elversberg	End of contract	30 June 2025	
DF	(Germany) Patric Pfeiffer	(Germany) FC Augsburg	loan return	30 June 2025	
MF	(Cape Verde) Bryan Teixeira	(Austria) Sturm Graz	loan return	30 June 2025	
DF	(Togo) Pierre Nadjombe	(Germany) Alemannia Aachen	loan	22 August 2025	
FW	(Netherlands) Martijn Kaars	(Germany) FC St. Pauli	EUR 4.000.000,00	28 August 2025	

== Friendlies ==
=== Pre-season ===
25 June 2025 Friendly	Burger BC (Germany)	0–11	(Germany) 1. FC Magdeburg	Burg
				Stadium: Flickschuhpark; Attendance: 1,674; Referee: Max Goroncy

28 June 2025 Friendly	SV Dessau 05 (Germany)	0–10	(Germany) 1. FC Magdeburg	Dessau
				Stadium: Schillerpark; Attendance: 1,274; Referee: Albert Lehmann

10 July 2025 Friendly	FC Zürich (Switzerland)	2–0	(Germany) 1. FC Magdeburg	Mindelheim
		Report		Stadium: Julius-Strohmayer-Stadion; Attendance: 350; Referee: Felix Wagner

18 July 2025 Friendly	1. FC Magdeburg (Germany)	2–5	(Germany) Rot-Weiss Essen	Magdeburg
14:00		Report		Stadium: Avnet-Arena; Attendance: 1,605; Referee: Eric Weisbach

19 July 2025 Friendly	Chemnitzer FC (Germany)	1–1	(Germany) 1. FC Magdeburg	Chemnitz
16:00				Stadium: Stadion an der Gellertstraße

26 July 2025 Friendly	1. FC Magdeburg (Germany)	3–4	(Germany) VfL Wolfsburg	Magdeburg
				Stadium: Avnet-Arena

=== Mid-season ===
3 September 2025 Friendly	FC Erzgebirge Aue (Germany)	1–1	(Germany) 1. FC Magdeburg	Aue
14:00				Stadium: Erzgebirgsstadion; Attendance: 0

9 October 2025 Friendly	1. FC Magdeburg (Germany)	0–6	(Germany) Eintracht Braunschweig	Magdeburg
14:00				Stadium: Avnet-Arena Platz 1 Attendance: 0

13 November 2025 Friendly	1. FC Schweinfurt 05 (Germany)	1–0	(Germany) 1. FC Magdeburg	Gotha
13:30				Stadium: Volkspark-Stadion; Attendance: 0

6 January 2026 Friendly	FC Winterthur (Switzerland)	1-2	(Germany) 1. FC Magdeburg	Alsu
13:30 CET		Report		Stadium: Mardan Sports Complex; Attendance: 210

9 January 2026 Friendly	SSV Ulm 1846 (Germany)	2-4	(Germany) 1. FC Magdeburg	Side
12:00 CET				Stadium: Arslan Zeki Demirci Sports Complex; Attendance: 190

== Competitions ==
=== Overall record ===
Competition	First match	Last match	Starting round	Final position	Record							
Competition	First match	Last match	Starting round	Final position	Pld	W	D	L	GF	GA	GD	Win %
2. Bundesliga	3 August 2025	17 May 2026	Matchday 1	14th	34	12	3	19	52	58	−6	35.29
DFB-Pokal	15 August 2025	2 December 2025	First round	Round of 16	3	2	0	1	7	4	+3	66.67
Total					37	14	3	20	59	62	−3	37.84

Source: Soccerway

=== 2. Bundesliga ===
==== League table ====
Pos	Team	Pld	W	D	L	GF	GA	GD	Pts	Promotion, qualification or relegation
12	Holstein Kiel	34	11	8	15	44	48	−4	41	
13	Arminia Bielefeld	34	10	9	15	53	51	+2	39	
14	1. FC Magdeburg	34	12	3	19	52	58	−6	39	
15	Eintracht Braunschweig	34	10	7	17	36	54	−18	37	
16	Greuther Fürth (O)	34	10	7	17	49	68	−19	37	Qualification for relegation play-offs

Source: Bundesliga
Rules for classification: 1) Points; 2) Goal difference; 3) Goals scored; 4) Head-to-head results; 5) Head-to-head away goals scored; 6) Away goals scored; 7) Play-off.
(Rules 4–6 only apply after home and away matches have been played between the tied teams.)
(O) Play-off winners

==== Matches ====
The match schedule was released on 27 June 2025.

3 August 2025 1	1. FC Magdeburg	0–1	Eintracht Braunschweig	Magdeburg
13:30		Report	Aydin 82'	Stadium: Avnet Arena; Attendance: 28.780; Referee: Tom Bauer

9 August 2025 2	Dynamo Dresden	1–2	1. FC Magdeburg	Dresden
13:00	Hugonet 28'; Kaars 45+1'	Report	Daferner 44'	Stadium: Rudolf-Harbig-Stadion; Attendance: 31,500; Referee: Timo Gansloweit

23 August 2025 3	Hannover 96	3–1	1. FC Magdeburg	Hannover
13:00		Report		Stadium: Heinz-von-Heiden-Arena; Attendance: 40,200; Referee: Richard Hempel

31 August 2025 4	1. FC Magdeburg	4–5	SpVgg Greuther Fürth	Magdeburg
13:30		Report		Stadium: Avnet Arena; Attendance: 23,673; Referee: Patrick Alt

12 September 2025 5	Arminia Bielefeld	2–0	1. FC Magdeburg	Bielefeld
18:30	Corboz 52'; Grodowski 62'	Report		Stadium: SchücoArena; Attendance: 26,075; Referee: Konrad Oldhafer

20 September 2025 6	1. FC Magdeburg	0–2	FC Schalke 04	Magdeburg
13:00		Report	Karaman 10'; Karaman 56' (pen.)	Stadium: Avnet Arena; Attendance: 27,424; Referee: Felix Bickel

27 September 2025 7	Karlsruher SC	1–0	1. FC Magdeburg	Karlsruhe
13:00	Kobald 83'	Report		Stadium: Wildparkstadion; Attendance: 28,337; Referee: Wolfgang Haselberger

5 October 2025 8	1. FC Magdeburg	0–4	SV Elversberg	Magdeburg
13:30		Report	Conte 23'; Zimmerschied 45'; Stange 74'; Malanga 80'	Stadium: Avnet Arena; Attendance: 21,884; Referee: Richard Hempel

19 October 2025 9	SV Darmstadt 98	0–0	1. FC Magdeburg	Darmstadt
13:30		Report		Stadium: Stadion am Böllenfalltor; Attendance: 17,000; Referee: Marc Philip Eckermann

26 October 2025 10	1. FC Magdeburg	2–0	SC Preußen Münster	Magdeburg
13:30	Breunig 75' (pen.); Grieb 90'	Report		Stadium: Avnet Arena; Attendance: 23,002; Referee: Robert Kampka

2 November 2025 11	VfL Bochum	2–0	1. FC Magdeburg	Bochum
13:30	Wätjen 41'; Holtmann 60'	Report		Stadium: Ruhrstadion; Attendance: 26,000; Referee: Felix Wagner

9 November 2025 12	1. FC Magdeburg	0–1	SC Paderborn	Magdeburg
13:30		Report	Klaas 9'	Stadium: Avnet Arena; Attendance: 21,654; Referee: Felix Prigan

22 November 2025 13	Fortuna Düsseldorf	2–1	1. FC Magdeburg	Düsseldorf
13:00	Itten 37'; Itten 90+5'	Report	Lenz 88' (o.g.)	Stadium: Rheinstadion; Attendance: 51,500; Referee: Tom Bauer

29 November 2025 14	1. FC Magdeburg	3–0	1. FC Nürnberg	Magdeburg
20:30	Zukowski 73'; Zukowski 90+5'; Breunig 90+10'	Report		Stadium: Avnet Arena; Attendance: 26,943; Referee: Felix Bickel

7 December 2025 15	Hertha BSC	0–2	1. FC Magdeburg	Berlin
13:30		Report	Pesch (yellow card) 6'; Geschwill (yellow card) 10'; Nollenberger 74'; Ghrieb 90+10'; Ghrieb (yellow card) 90+11'	Stadium: Olympiastadion Berlin; Referee: Konrad Oldhafer

13 December 2025 16	1. FC Magdeburg	3–3	Holstein Kiel	Magdeburg
13:00	Zec 43' (pen.); Zec 68' (pen.); Skrzybski 90+2'	Report	Pesch 45+1'; Atik 45+4'; Zukowski 84' (pen.)	Stadium: Avnet Arena; Attendance: 26,497; Referee: Lukas Benen

20 December 2025 17	1. FC Kaiserslautern	2–3	1. FC Magdeburg	Kaiserslautern
13:00	Ritter (yellow card) 27' (goal) 56' (pen.); Sahin (yellow card) 43'; Hanslik 53'; Kunze (yellow card) 65'; Robinson (yellow card) 70'; Tachie (yellow card) 73'; Lieberknecht (yellow card) 76'; Abiama (yellow card) 90+1'	Report	Atik 22'; Hercher (yellow card) 29'; Müller (yellow card) 33'; Żukowski 35' (yellow card) 73'; Nollenberger 49'; Breunig (yellow card) 89'; Stalmach (yellow card) 90+7'	Stadium: Fritz-Walter-Stadion; Attendance: 49,000; Referee: Michael Bacher

16 January 2026 18	Eintracht Braunschweig	0-3	1. FC Magdeburg	Braunschweig
18:30		Report	Żukowski 34'; Atik 79'; Breunig 90'	Stadium: Eintracht-Stadion; Attendance: 22,436; Referee: Patrick Alt

24 Januar 2026 19	1. FC Magdeburg	1-2	Dynamo Dresden	Magdeburg
20:30	Żukowski 29'	Report	Amoako 34'; Keller 45+3'	Stadium: Avnet Arena; Attendance: 27,815; Referee: Dr. Max Burda

30 Januar 2026 20	1. FC Magdeburg	1-2	Hannover 96	Magdeburg
18:30	Atik 53'	Report	Yokota 38'; Leopold 56'	Stadium: Avnet Arena; Attendance: 25,790; Referee: Timo Gansolweit

6 February 2026 21	SpVgg Greuther Fürth	4-5	1. FC Magdeburg	Fürth
18:30	Bjarnason 8'; Arifi 43'; Elvedi 45+5'; Ltaief 47'	Report	Münz 13' (o.g.); Żukowski 15'; Ghrieb 23'; Żukowski 29'; Żukowski 33'	Stadium: Sportpark Ronhof; Attendance: 11,061; Referee: Lars Erbst

15 February 2026 22	1. FC Magdeburg	0-2	Arminia Bielefeld	Magdeburg
13:30		Report	Bauer 32'; Baokye 88'	Stadium: Avnet Arena; Attendance: 23,759; Referee: Marc Philip Eckermann

21 February 2026 23	FC Schalke 04	5-3	1. FC Magdeburg	Gelsenkirchen
20:30	Hugonet 15' (o.g.); Dzeko 39'; Karaman 49' (pen.); Lubicic 65'; Karaman 68'	Report	Nollenberger 17'; Żukowski 53'; Żukowski 84' (pen.)	Stadium: Arena auf Schalke; Attendance: 61,378; Referee: Timo Gerach

1 March 2026 24	1. FC Magdeburg	1–3	Karlsruher SC	Magdeburg
13:30	Stalmach 82'	Report	Farhat 20'; Farhat 53'; Wanitzek 87'	Stadium: Avnet Arena; Attendance: 24,081; Referee: Konrad Oldhafer

6 March 2026 25	SV Elversberg	1–0	1. FC Magdeburg	Elversberg
13:30	LPoręba 85'	Report		Stadium: Waldstadion Kaiserlinde; Attendance: 8,652; Referee: Wolfgang Haslberger

13 March 2026 26	1. FC Magdeburg	1–1	SV Darmstadt 98	Magdeburg
13:30	Nürnberger 62' (o.g.)	Report	Nürnberger 67'	Stadium: Avnet Arena; Attendance: 18,488; Referee: Dr. Matthias Jöllenbeck

22 March 2026 27	Preußen Münster	1–3	1. FC Magdeburg	Münster
13:30	Amenyido 80'	Report	Żukowski 45+2' (pen.); Żukowski 72'; Tachie 90+5'	Stadium: Preußenstadion; Attendance: 10,642; Referee: Robert Schröder

4 April 2026 28	1. FC Magdeburg	4–1	VfL Bochum	Magdeburg
13:00	Musonda 7'; Atik 44'; Żukowski 71'; Żukowski 73'	Report	Hofmann 56'	Stadium: Avnet Arena; Attendance: 25,030; Referee: Felix Prigan

12 April 2026 29	SC Paderborn	4–3	1. FC Magdeburg	Paderborn
13:30	Bilbija 19'; Bilbija 29'; Bilbija 45+2'; Bilbija 78'	Report	Musonda 25'; Żukowski 37'; Ulrich 59'	Stadium: Home Deluxe Arena; Attendance: 15,000; Referee: Timo Gansloweit

18 April 2026 30	1. FC Magdeburg	2–0	Fortuna Düsseldorf	Magdeburg
13:00	Ulrich 2'; Żukowski 16'	Report		Stadium: Avnet Arena; Attendance: 24,608; Referee: Felix Wagner

26 April 2026 31	1. FC Nürnberg	1–0	1. FC Magdeburg	Nürnberg
13:30	Lubach 45+2'	Report		Stadium: Frankenstadion; Attendance: 37,712; Referee: Patrick Schwengers

3 May 2026 32	1. FC Magdeburg	1–0	Hertha BSC	Magdeburg
13:30	Ulrich 61'	Report		Stadium: Avnet Arena; Attendance: 28,123; Referee: Jarno Wienefeld

9 May 2026 33	Holstein Kiel	1–3	1. FC Magdeburg	Kiel
13:00	Kapralik 90+2'	Report	Hugonet 40'; Stalmach 45+2'; Atik 56'	Stadium: Holsteinstadion; Attendance: 14,679; Referee: Martin Petersen

17 May 2026 34	1. FC Magdeburg	0–1	1. FC Kaiserslautern	Magdeburg
15:30		Report	Ritter 63' (pen.)	Stadium: Avnet Arena; Attendance: 28,875; Referee: Dr. Max Burda

=== DFB-Pokal ===
15 August 2025 First round	1. FC Saarbrücken	1–3	1. FC Magdeburg	Saarbrücken
18:30		Report		Stadium: Ludwigsparkstadion; Attendance: 14.717; Referee: Dr. Robin Braun

29 October 2025 Second round	FV Illertissen	0–3	1. FC Magdeburg	Illertissen
18:00		Report		Stadium: Voehlin-Stadium; Attendance: 4,157; Referee: Patrick Schwengers

2 December 2025 Round of 16	RB Leipzig	3–1	1. FC Magdeburg	Leipzig
21:00		Report		Stadium: Zentralstadion; Attendance: 41,108; Referee: Felix Zwayer
