= 2026–27 1. FC Magdeburg season =

German Association football club season

1. FC Magdeburg
2026-27 season
- President: Jörg Biastock
- Head coach: Petrik Sander
- Stadium: Avnet Arena
Home colours	Away colours	Third colours

The 2026–27 season is the 61th season in the history of 1. FC Magdeburg and the fifth consecutive season in 2. Bundesliga. In addition to the domestic league, the team is scheduled to participate in the DFB-Pokal.

== Players ==
As of 3 September 2026

Note: Flags indicate national team as defined under FIFA eligibility rules; some limited exceptions apply. Players may hold more than one non-FIFA nationality.

No.	Pos.	Nation	Player
1	GK	GER	Dominik Reimann (captain)
3	DF	IRL	Anselmo García MacNulty
4	DF	LUX	Eldin Džogović
5	DF	GER	Tobias Müller
6	DF	GER	Paul Jaeckel
7	DF	UGA	Herbert Bockhorn
8	FW	GER	Emmanuel Iyoha
9	FW	CRO	Roko Šimić (on loan from Cardiff City)
10	MF	GER	Moritz-Broni Kwarteng
11	MF	PER	Felipe Chávez (on loan from Bayern Munich)
15	MF	GER	Tony Reitz
15	DF	GER	Daniel Heber
17	FW	GER	Alexander Nollenberger
18	FW	KOR	Lee Chung-hyun (on loan from Bucheon)
19	DF	ZAM	Lubambo Musonda

No.	Pos.	Nation	Player
20	MF	GER	Kevin Manthey
21	MF	GER	Falko Michel
22	FW	POL	Mateusz Żukowski
23	FW	TUR	Barış Atik
26	MF	GER	Torben Müsel
27	MF	KOR	Yoon Do-young (on loan from Brighton)
28	DF	TOG	Pierre Nadjombe
29	MF	GER	Richmond Tachie
30	GK	GER	Noah Kruth
33	MF	GER	Leon Mergner
34	DF	GER	Tarek Chahed
35	MF	GER	Magnus Baars
38	MF	FIN	Luka Hyryläinen
40	GK	GER	Robert Kampa

== Transfers ==
=== In ===
Pos.	Player	Transferred from	Fee	Date	Source
DF	(Togo) Pierre Nadjombe	(Germany) Alemannia Aachen	Loan return	1 July 2026	
DF	(Germany) Tony Reitz	(Germany) Borussia Dortmund II	€400,000	1 July 2026	
DF	(Germany) Torben Müßel	(Germany) Rot-Weiss Essen	Free	1 July 2026	
DF	(Germany) Kevin Manthey	(Germany) Werder Bremen II	Free	1 July 2026	
DF	(Republic of Ireland) Anselmo Garcia MacNulty	(Netherlands) PEC Zwolle	Free	1 July 2026	
FW	(South Korea) Yoon Do-young	(England) Brighton and Hove Albion	Loan	6 July 2026	
DF	(Germany) Paul Jaeckel	(Germany) Preussen Münster	Free	7 July 2026	
MF	(Germany) Moritz-Broni Kwarteng	(Germany) VfL Bochum	€300,000	7 July 2026	
DF	(South Korea) Lee Chung-Hyun	(South Korea) Bucheon FC 1995	Loan	14 July 2026	
FW	(Germany) Emmanuel Ihoya	(Germany) Fortuna Düsseldorf	Free	16 July 2026	
FW	(Croatia) Roko Simic	(England) Cardiff City	Loan	19 August 2026	
MF	(Peru) Felipe Chávez	(Germany) Bayern Munich	Loan	26 August 2026	

=== Out ===
Pos.	Player	Transferred to	Fee	Date	Source
FW	(France) Rayan Ghrieb	(Germany) 1. FC Nürnberg	€600,000	30 June 2026	
MF	(Germany) Noah Pesch	(Germany) Borussia Mönchengladbach	Loan return	30 June 2026	
FW	(Germany) Maximilian Breunig	(Germany) 1. FC Heidenheim	Loan return	30 June 2026	
DF	(Germany) Max Geschwill	(Germany) Holstein Kiel	Loan return	30 June 2026	
MF	(Germany) Laurin Ulrich	(Germany) VfB Stuttgart	Loan return	30 June 2026	
MF	(France) Jean Hugonet	(Germany) Hannover 96	End of contract	30 June 2026	
DF	(Denmark) Marcus Mathisen	(Germany) FC St. Pauli	End of contract	30 June 2026	
MF	(Poland) Dariusz Stalmach	(Germany) Werder Bremen	Undisclosed	1 July 2026	
DF	(Ivory Coast) Silas Gnaka	(Belarus) ML Vitebsk	End of contract	30 June 2026	

== Friendlies ==
=== Pre-season ===
1 July 2026 Friendly	SG Blau-Weiß Neuenhofe (Germany)	0–9	(Germany) 1. FC Magdeburg	Neuenhofe
18:30 CEST (UTC+2)				Stadium: Sportanlage Tecken - Westheide-Neuenhofe; Attendance: 2,241

4 July 2026 Friendly	FSV Havelberg 1911 (Germany)	0–23	(Germany) 1. FC Magdeburg	Havelberg
14:00 CEST (UTC+2)				Stadium: Sportplatz Im Mühlenholz - Havelberg; Attendance: 1,453

12 July 2026 Friendly	BSG Chemie Leipzig (Germany)	1–4	(Germany) 1. FC Magdeburg	Leipzig
14:00 CEST (UTC+2)				Stadium: Alfred-Kunze-Sportpark; Attendance: 4,999; Referee: Miriam Schwermer

18 July 2026 Friendly	FSV Schöningen (Germany)	0–4	(Germany) 1. FC Magdeburg	Schöningen
14:00 CEST (UTC+2)				Stadium: Elm-Stadion; Attendance: 1,650

25 July 2026 Friendly	SC Paderborn (Germany)	0–2	(Germany) 1. FC Magdeburg	Paderborn
14:00 CEST (UTC+2)				Attendance: 0 Referee: Dr. Florian Exner

1 August 2026 Friendly	1. FC Magdeburg (Germany)	1–1	(England) West Ham United	Magdeburg
14:30 CEST (UTC+2)				Stadium: Avnet Arena; Attendance: 13,279; Referee: Eric Weisbach

== Competitions ==
=== Overall record ===
Competition	First match	Last match	Starting round	Final position	Record							
Competition	First match	Last match	Starting round	Final position	Pld	W	D	L	GF	GA	GD	Win %
2. Bundesliga	8 August 2026	23 May 2027	Matchday 1		10	5	2	3	21	13	+8	50.00
DFB-Pokal	23 August 2026	28 Ocotober 2026	First round	Second Round	2	1	0	1	5	6	−1	50.00
Total					12	6	2	4	26	19	+7	50.00

Last updated: 31 October 2026
Source: Soccerway

=== 2. Bundesliga ===
==== League table ====
Pos	Team	Pld	W	D	L	GF	GA	GD	Pts	Promotion, qualification or relegation
2	1. FC Nürnberg	11	7	3	1	26	13	+13	24	Promotion to Bundesliga
3	1. FC Kaiserslautern	11	6	3	2	10	7	+3	21	Qualification for promotion play-offs
4	1. FC Magdeburg	11	6	2	3	25	14	+11	20	
5	VfL Wolfsburg	11	5	4	2	26	16	+10	19	
6	Arminia Bielefeld	11	5	2	4	18	16	+2	17	

Updated to match(es) played on 8 November 2026. Source: Bundesliga
Rules for classification: 1) Points; 2) Goal difference; 3) Goals scored; 4) Head-to-head results; 5) Head-to-head away goals scored; 6) Away goals scored; 7) Play-off.
(Rules 4–6 only apply after home and away matches have been played between the tied teams.)

==== Matches ====
8 August 2026 1	1. FC Magdeburg	1–6	Eintracht Braunschweig	Magdeburg
13:00 CEST (UTC+2)	Zukowski 49'	Report	Opoku 15'; Urbich 21'; Urbich 26'; Aydin 44' (pen.); Di Benedetto 50'; Flick 61'	Stadium: Avnet Arena; Attendance: 28,508; Referee: Felix Prigan

15 August 2026 2	VfL Osnabrück	0–3	1. FC Magdeburg	Osnabrück
13.00 CEST (UTC+2)		Report	Nollenberger 24'; Nollenberger 35'; Iyoha 69'	Stadium: Stadion an der Bremer Brücke; Attendance: 15,741; Referee: Justin Hamann

30 August 2026 3	1. FC Magdeburg	2–0	Holstein Kiel	Magdeburg
13:30 CEST (UTC+2)	Zukowski 72'; Hyryläinen 81'	Report		Stadium: Avnet Arena; Referee: Jarno Wienefeld

6 September 2026 4	Hertha BSC	2–1	1. FC Magdeburg	Berlin
13:30 CEST (UTC+2)	Brekalo 10'; Þorsteinsson (yellow card) 12'; Adewumi 47'; Seguin (yellow card) 51' (yellow-red card) 62'	Report	Michel 31'; García (yellow card) 45+1'; Müller (yellow card) 50' (yellow-red card) 73'	Stadium: Olympiastadion Berlin; Attendance: 60,569; Referee: Florian Exner

12 September 2026 5	1. FC Magdeburg	3–0	1. FC Kaiserslautern	Magdeburg
13:00 CEST (UTC+2)	Iyoha 12', 53'; Nollenberger 16'; García MacNulty (yellow card) 71'	Report	Gyamfi (yellow card) 65'; Elvedi (yellow card) 86'	Stadium: Avnet Arena; Attendance: 24,180; Referee: Marc-Philip Eckermann

18 September 2026 6	SpVgg Greuther Fürth	1–1	1. FC Magdeburg	Fürth
18:30 CEST (UTC+2)	Sillah 20'; Heuer (yellow card) 33'; Will (yellow card) 74'; Srbeny (yellow card) 79'	Report	Iyoha 5'; Hyryläinen (yellow card) 57'	Stadium: Sportpark Ronhof; Referee: Cristian Ballweg

10 October 2026 7	1. FC Magdeburg	3–0	Hannover 96	Magdeburg
13:00 CEST (UTC+2)	Kwarteng 3'; Iyoha 30'; Zukowski (yellow card) 62', (goal) 86'	Report	Sahiti (yellow card) 18'; Tomiak (yellow card) 62'	Stadium: Avnet Arena; Attendance: 26,502; Referee: Sascha Stegemann

18 October 2026 8	Dynamo Dresden	2–0	1. FC Magdeburg	Dresden
13:30 CEST (UTC+2)	Hauptmann 9' (pen.); Straudi 50'; Muhamedbegovic (yellow card) 85'	Report		Stadium: Rudolf-Harbig-Stadion; Attendance: 30,651; Referee: Dr. Robin Braun

24 October 2026 9	1. FC Magdeburg	6–1	Karlsruher SC	Magdeburg
CE(S)T (UTC+1/2)	Zukowski (yellow card) 6', (goal) 39' (pen.), 51' (pen.); Atik (yellow card) 39'; Garcia MacNulty 54'; Iyoha 59'; Šimić 66'; Mergner 90+3'	Report	Trémoulet (yellow card) 37'; Ofli 82'	Stadium: Avnet Arena; Attendance: 21,146; Referee: Felix Wagner

31 October 2026 10	SV Darmstadt 98	1–1	1. FC Magdeburg	Darmstadt
13:00 CET (UTC+1)	Smit 37'	Report	Müller 14'	Stadium: Stadion am Böllenfalltor; Attendance: 17,333; Referee: Lukas Benen

8 November 2026 11	1. FC Magdeburg	v	FC St. Pauli	Magdeburg
13:30 CET (UTC+1)				Stadium: Avnet Arena

20 November 2026 12	Arminia Bielefeld	v	1. FC Magdeburg	Bielefeld
18:30 CET (UTC+1)				Stadium: Schüco Arena

29 November 2026 13	1. FC Magdeburg	v	Energie Cottbus	Magdeburg
13:30 CET (UTC+1)				Stadium: Avnet Arena

6 December 2026 14	VfL Wolfsburg	v	1. FC Magdeburg	Wolfsburg
13:30 CET (UTC+1)				Stadium: VW Arena

11 December 2026 15	1. FC Magdeburg	v	1. FC Nürnberg	Magdeburg
18:30 CET (UTC+1)				Stadium: Avnet Arena

19 December 2026 16	VfL Bochum	v	1. FC Magdeburg	Bochum
20:30 CET (UTC+1)				Stadium: Ruhrstadion

16 January 2027 17	1. FC Magdeburg	v	1. FC Heidenheim	Magdeburg
13:00 CET (UTC+1)				Stadium: Avnet Arena

22 January 2027 18	Eintracht Braunschweig	v	1. FC Magdeburg	Braunschweig
18:30 CET (UTC+1)				Stadium: Eintracht-Stadion

29–31 January 2027 19	1. FC Magdeburg	v	VfL Osnabrück	Magdeburg
				Stadium: Avnet Arena

5–7 February 2027 20	Holstein Kiel	v	1. FC Magdeburg	Kiel
				Stadium: Holstein-Stadion

12–14 February 2027 21	1. FC Magdeburg	v	Hertha BSC	Magdeburg
				Stadium: Avnet Arena

19–21 February 2027 22	1. FC Kaiserslautern	v	1. FC Magdeburg	Kaiserslautern
				Stadium: Fritz-Walter-Stadion

26–28 February 2027 23	1. FC Magdeburg	v	SpVgg Greuther Fürth	Magdeburg
				Stadium: Avnet Arena

2–4 March 2027 24	Hannover 96	v	1. FC Magdeburg	Hannover
				Stadium: Niedersachsenstadion

5–7 March 2027 25	1. FC Magdeburg	v	Dynamo Dresden	Magdeburg
				Stadium: Avnet Arena

12–14 March 2027 26	Karlsruher SC	v	1. FC Magdeburg	Karlsruhe
				Stadium: Wildparkstadion

19–21 March 2027 27	1. FC Magdeburg	v	SV Darmstadt 98	Magdeburg
				Stadium: Avnet Arena

2–4 April 2027 28	FC St. Pauli	v	1. FC Magdeburg	Hamburg
				Stadium: Millerntorstadion

9–11 April 2027 29	1. FC Magdeburg	v	Arminia Bielefeld	Magdeburg
				Stadium: Avnet Arena

16–18 April 2027 30	Energie Cottbus	v	1. FC Magdeburg	Cottbus
				Stadium: Stadion der Freundschaft

23–25 April 2027 31	1. FC Magdeburg	v	VfL Wolfsburg	Magdeburg
				Stadium: Avnet Arena

7–9 May 2027 32	1. FC Nürnberg	v	1. FC Magdeburg	Nürnberg
				Stadium: Frankenstadion

14–16 May 2027 33	1. FC Magdeburg	v	VfL Bochum	Magdeburg
				Stadium: Avnet Arena

23 May 2027 34	1. FC Heidenheim	v	1. FC Magdeburg	Heidenheim
15:30 CEST (UTC+2)				Stadium: Voith-Arena

=== DFB-Pokal ===
23 August 2026 First round	Bahlinger SC	0–4	1. FC Magdeburg	Bahlingen
15:30 CEST (UTC+2)		Report	Zukowski 5', 44'; Michel 31', 77'	Stadium: Kaiserstuhlstadion; Attendance: 3,545; Referee: Felix Wagner

28 October 2026 Second round	FC Bayern Munich	6–1	1. FC Magdeburg	Munich
20:45 CET (UTC+1)	Olise 10', 50' (pen.); Saibari 21'; Davies 70'; Brown 73'; Daiber 90+3'	Report	Zukowski 15'	Stadium: Allianz Arena; Attendance: 75,000; Referee: Harm Osmers
