= 2024–25 1. FC Magdeburg season =

1. FC Magdeburg
2024–25 season
- Manager: Christian Titz
- Stadium: MDCC-Arena
- 2. Bundesliga: 5th
- DFB-Pokal: First round
- Top goalscorer: League: Martijn Kaars (19); All: Martijn Kaars (20)
- Highest home attendance: 27,863 v. Eintracht Braunschweig
- Lowest home attendance: 20,665 v. SC Paderborn
- Average home league attendance: 25,300
- Biggest win: 1. FC Nürnberg 0–4 1. FC Magdeburg
- Biggest defeat: 1. FC Magdeburg 0–5 Preußen Münster
Home colours	Away colours	Third colours

The 2024–25 season was the 59th season in the history of 1. FC Magdeburg, and their third consecutive season in the 2. Bundesliga. In addition to the domestic league, the club participated in the DFB-Pokal.

== Summary ==
On 28 June, goalkeeper Noah Kruth extended his contract.

== Transfers ==
=== In ===
Pos.	Player	Transferred from	Fee	Date	Source
MF	(Germany) Ahmet Arslan	(Germany) Dynamo Dresden	Loan return	30 June 2024	
DF	(Togo) Pierre Nadjombe	(Germany) 1. FC Köln II		1 July 2024	
DF	(Germany) Philipp Hercher	(Germany) 1. FC Kaiserslautern	Free	1 July 2024	
FW	(Netherlands) Martijn Kaars	(Netherlands) Helmond Sport	Undisclosed	1 July 2024	
MF	(Germany) Robert Leipertz	(Germany) SC Paderborn	Free	1 July 2024	
DF	(Zambia) Lubambo Musonda	(Denmark) AC Horsens		1 July 2024	
MF	(Germany) Falko Michel	(Germany) Borussia Dortmund II	Free	1 July 2024	
MF	(Denmark) Marcus Mathisen	(Germany) Wehen Wiesbaden	Undisclosed	1 July 2024	
MF	(Germany) Abu-Bekir El-Zein	(Germany) SV Sandhausen	Free	1 July 2024	
MF	(Turkey) Livan Burcu	(Germany) Union Berlin	Loan	20 July 2024	
FW	(Montenegro) Aleksa Marušić	(North Macedonia) FK Voska Sport	Undisclosed	22 July 2024	
FW	(Sweden) Alexander Ahl Holmström	(Sweden) GAIS Gothenburg	Undisclosed	1 January 2025	

=== Out ===
Pos.	Player	Transferred to	Fee	Date	Source
FW	(Germany) Luca Schuler	(Germany) 1. FC Magdeburg	End of contract	1 July 2024	
MF	(Zimbabwe) Jonah Fabisch	(Germany) Erzgebirge Aue	Undisclosed	1 July 2024	
MF	(Libya) Daniel Elfadli	(Germany) Hamburger SV	Undisclosed	1 July 2024	
MF	(Germany) Amara Condé	(Netherlands) SC Heerenveen	Undisclosed	11 July 2024	
DF	(Kosovo) Andi Hoti	(Germany) Dynamo Dresden	Loan	3 January 2025	

== Friendlies ==
=== Pre-season ===
26 June 2024 Friendly	Blau-Weiss Loburg (Germany)	0–24	(Germany) 1. FC Magdeburg	Loburg
		Report	Michel 5'; Atik 7', 13', 32', 45', 45+3'; Amaechi 8'; Bockhorn 10'; Kaars 21', 26' (pen.); Krempicki 45+1'; Ito 49'; Ceka 56', 61', 74'; 58' (o.g.); Hercher 62', 64'; Džogović 70'; Leipertz 72'; El-Zein 81', 88'; Teixeira 86', 90+1'	Stadium: Sportplatz; Attendance: 2,000; Referee: Christian Schütze

29 June 2024 Friendly	Quedlinburger SV (Germany)	0–16	(Germany) 1. FC Magdeburg	Quedlinburg
		Report	Kuhinja 17', 20', 41', 45'; Hercher 28'; Bockhorn 31'; Ito 32'; Ceka 38'; Nollenberger 56'; Musonda 68'; Atik 69'; Michel 76'; Kaars 80', 84'; Amaechi 88'; Krempicki 89'	Stadium: Guts-Muths-Stadion; Attendance: 2,200; Referee: Robin Enkelmann

2 July 2024 Friendly	1. FC Magdeburg (Germany)	3–0	(Germany) BFC Dynamo	Magdeburg
15:00	Atik (penalty missed) 7'; Hercher 16'; Krempicki 35'; Ceka 57'	Report		Stadium: MDCC-Arena

5 July 2024 Friendly	Bayern Munich II (Germany)	1–1	(Germany) 1. FC Magdeburg	Kirchheim
13:00	Wagner 32'	Report	Ito 48'	Stadium: Sportanlage Heimstetten; Attendance: 250; Referee: Luca Schultze

12 July 2024 Friendly	1. FC Magdeburg (Germany)	4–0	(Switzerland) Zürich	Benningen
11:00	Hercher 33'; Musonda 53'; Kaars 75'; Atik 88'	Report		Stadium: FC Benningen Hauptfeld

12 July 2024 Friendly	1. FC Magdeburg (Germany)	1–1	(Switzerland) Zürich	Benningen
13:00	Amaechi 30' (pen.)	Report	Sabobo 45'	Stadium: FC Benningen Hauptfeld; Attendance: 300
Note: Match No.2

20 July 2024 Friendly	1. FC Magdeburg (Germany)	1–1	(Germany) VfL Bochum	Magdeburg
14:00	Kaars 30'		Broschinski 7'

26 July 2024 Friendly	Norwich City (England)	0–1	(Germany) 1. FC Magdeburg
19:45

27 July 2024 Friendly	1. FC Magdeburg (Germany)	2–4	(Italy) Sampdoria	Magdeburg
15:00				Stadium: MDCC-Arena

=== Mid-season ===
12 August 2024 Friendly	Eintracht Braunschweig (Germany)	1–1	(Germany) 1. FC Magdeburg	Braunschweig

5 September 2024 Friendly	VfL Osnabrück (Germany)	3-4	(Germany) 1. FC Magdeburg	Schöningen
				Attendance: 250

10 October 2024 Friendly	1. FC Magdeburg (Germany)	4–1	(Germany) Energie Cottbus	Magdeburg
				Attendance: 0

14 November 2024 Friendly	Hannover 96 (Germany)	2-2	(Germany) 1. FC Magdeburg	Hannover
				Attendance: 0

4 January 2025 Friendly	Gangwon FC (South Korea)	0–5	(Germany) 1. FC Magdeburg	Turkey
				Attendance: 100

10 January 2025 Friendly	Dynamo Kyiv (Ukraine)	1–3	(Germany) 1. FC Magdeburg	Turkey
14:00				Attendance: 125

10 January 2025 Friendly	Hannover 96 (Germany)	0–3	(Germany) 1. FC Magdeburg	Turkey
10:00				Attendance: 190

21 March 2025 Friendly	Odra Opole (Poland)	1–1	(Germany) 1. FC Magdeburg	Opole
19:15

== Competitions ==
=== Overall record ===
Competition	First match	Last match	Starting round	Record							
Competition	First match	Last match	Starting round	Pld	W	D	L	GF	GA	GD	Win %
2. Bundesliga	3 August 2024	18 May 2025	Matchday 1	34	14	11	9	64	52	+12	41.18
DFB-Pokal	19 August 2024	19 August 2024	First round	1	0	0	1	1	2	−1	0.00
Total				35	14	11	10	65	54	+11	40.00

Last updated: 3 July 2025
Source: Soccerway

=== 2. Bundesliga ===
==== League table ====
Pos	Team	Pld	W	D	L	GF	GA	GD	Pts	Promotion, qualification or relegation
3	SV Elversberg	34	16	10	8	64	37	+27	58	Qualification for promotion play-offs
4	SC Paderborn	34	15	10	9	56	46	+10	55	
5	1. FC Magdeburg	34	14	11	9	64	52	+12	53	
6	Fortuna Düsseldorf	34	14	11	9	57	52	+5	53	
7	1. FC Kaiserslautern	34	15	8	11	56	55	+1	53	

Source: Bundesliga
Rules for classification: 1) Points; 2) Goal difference; 3) Goals scored; 4) Head-to-head results; 5) Head-to-head away goals scored; 6) Away goals scored; 7) Play-off.
(Rules 4–6 only apply after home and away matches have been played between the tied teams.)

==== Results summary ====
Overall								Home						Away					
Pld	W	D	L	GF	GA	GD	Pts	W	D	L	GF	GA	GD	W	D	L	GF	GA	GD
34	14	11	9	64	52	+12	53	5	7	5	28	29	−1	9	4	4	36	23	+13

Last updated: 18 May 2025.
Source: https://www.kicker.de/2-bundesliga/heimtabelle-auswaertstabelle/2024-25

==== Results by round ====
Round	1	2	3	4	5	6	7	8	9	10	11	12	13	14	15	16	17	18	19	20	21	22	23	24	25	26	27	28	29	30	31	32	33	34
Ground	H	A	H	A	A	H	A	H	A	H	A	H	A	H	A	H	A	A	H	A	H	H	A	H	A	H	A	H	A	H	A	H	A	H
Result	D	W	D	W	W	D	W	D	L	L	D	D	W	L	W	D	W	W	D	W	L	W	L	W	D	L	D	W	L	W	D	L	L	W
Position	9	3	7	4	3	3	2	2	4	9	7	9	6	10	8	9	5	2	3	3	4	4	4	3	4	5	5	3	5	3	3	5	7	5

Updated to match(es) played on 18 May 2025. Source:
A = Away; H = Home; W = Win; D = Draw; L = Loss

==== Matches ====
The match schedule was released on 4 July 2024.

3 August 2024 1	1. FC Magdeburg	0–0	SV Elversberg	Magdeburg
13:00		Report		Stadium: Avnet Arena; Attendance: 21,469; Referee: Florian Heft

11 August 2024 2	Eintracht Braunschweig	1–3	1. FC Magdeburg	Braunschweig
13:30	Philippe 67'	Report	Kaars 13'; Kaars 55'; Gnaka 59'	Stadium: Eintracht-Stadion; Attendance: 22,791; Referee: Tobias Reichel

25 August 2024 3	1. FC Magdeburg	2–2	FC Schalke 04	Magdeburg
13:30	Mathisen 39'; Kaars 45+2'	Report	Sylla 8'; Karaman 76'	Stadium: Avnet Arena; Attendance: 27,146; Referee: Timo Gerach

31 August 2024 4	1. FC Nürnberg	0–4	1. FC Magdeburg	Nuremberg
13:00		Report	Amaechi 24'; Burcu 65'; Nollenberger 84'; Hercher 90+2'	Stadium: Max-Morlock-Stadion; Attendance: 29,500; Referee: Dr. Felix Brych

14 September 2024 5	1. FC Köln	1–2	1. FC Magdeburg	Cologne
20:30	Downs 24'	Report	Michel 66'; Hugonet 83'	Stadium: RheinEnergieStadion; Attendance: 50,000; Referee: Richard Hempel

22 September 2024 6	1. FC Magdeburg	2–2	Karlsruher SC	Magdeburg
13:30	Amaechi 5'; Hercher 78'	Report	Jensen 24'; Marvin Wanitzek 30'	Stadium: Avnet Arena; Attendance: 26,043; Referee: Patrick Alt

28 September 2024 7	Darmstadt 98	1–2	1. FC Magdeburg	Darmstadt
13:00	Isac Lidberg 11'	Report	Burcu 22'; Krempicki 48'	Stadium: Merck-Stadion am Böllenfalltor; Attendance: 16,800; Referee: Michael Bacher

6 October 2024 8	1. FC Magdeburg	2–2	SpVgg Greuther Fürth	Magdeburg
13:30	El Hankouri 15'; Kaars 18'	Report	Green 42'; Futkeu 75'	Stadium: Avnet Arena; Attendance: 22,615; Referee: Bastian Dankert

20 October 2024 9	Hamburger SV	3–1	1. FC Magdeburg	Hamburg
13:30	Königsdörffer 5'; Katterbach 42'; Selke 45+1'	Report	Kaars 63'	Stadium: Volksparkstadion; Attendance: 57,000; Referee: Sven Jablonski

27 October 2024 10	1. FC Magdeburg	0–3	Hannover 96	Magdeburg
13:30		Report	Voglsammer 13'; Voglsammer 23'; Nielsen 75'	Stadium: Avnet Arena; Attendance: 27,065; Referee: Tobias Stieler

3 November 2024 11	1. FC Kaiserslautern	2–2	1. FC Magdeburg	Kaiserslautern
13:30	Tomiak 32'; Ache 68'	Report	Loric 11'; Hercher 13'	Stadium: Fritz-Walter-Stadion; Attendance: 45,104; Referee: Florian Badstübner

9 November 2024 12	1. FC Magdeburg	0–0	SSV Ulm 1846	Magdeburg
13:00		Report		Stadium: Avnet Arena; Attendance: 21,933; Referee: Lars Erbst

24 November 2024 13	SSV Jahn Regensburg	0–1	1. FC Magdeburg	Regensburg
13:30		Report	El Hankouri 10'	Stadium: Jahnstadion Regensburg; Attendance: 11,047; Referee: Florian Heft

29 November 2024 14	1. FC Magdeburg	1–3	Hertha BSC	Magdeburg
18:30	El Hankouri 48'	Report	Scherhant 55'; Niederlechner 65'; Schuler 86'	Stadium: Avnet Arena; Attendance: 27,300; Referee: Richard Hempel

7 December 2024 15	SC Preußen Münster	1–2	1. FC Magdeburg	Münster
20:30	Mees 38'	Report	Atik 12'; Mathisen 54'	Stadium: Preußenstadion; Attendance: 12,422; Referee: Max Burda

14 December 2024 16	1. FC Magdeburg	1–1	SC Paderborn 07	Magdeburg
13:00	Hercher 57'	Report	Obermair 69'	Stadium: Avnet Arena; Attendance: 20,665; Referee: Lukas Benen

20 December 2024 17	Fortuna Düsseldorf	2–5	1. FC Magdeburg	Düsseldorf
18:30	Jóhannesson 15'; Rossmann 42'	Report	Kaars 11'; Atik 67'; Kaars 70'; El Hankouri 87'; Hercher 90+2'	Stadium: Merkur Spiel-Arena; Attendance: 33,527; Referee: Sascha Stegemann

19 January 2025 18	SV Elversberg	2–5	1. FC Magdeburg	Elversberg
13:30	Schnellbacher 3'; Lukas Petkov 36'	Report	Kaars 46'; Kaars 70'; Amaechi 77'; El Hankouri 82'; Kaars 90+1'	Stadium: Waldstadion an der Kaiserlinde; Attendance: 9,351; Referee: Lars Erbst

24 January 2025 19	1. FC Magdeburg	1–1	Eintracht Braunschweig	Magdeburg
18:30	Atik 5'	Report	Lino Tempelmann 69'	Stadium: Avnet Arena; Attendance: 27,863; Referee: Marc Pfitzner

1 February 2025 20	FC Schalke 04	2–5	1. FC Magdeburg	Gelsenkirchen
20:30	Gantenbein 69'; Bachmann 90+3'	Report	Kaars 29'; Kaars 45+2'; Kaars 56'; Philipp Hercher 65'; Kaars 74'	Stadium: Veltins-Arena; Attendance: 61,681; Referee: Patrick Alt

8 February 2025 21	1. FC Magdeburg	3–4	1. FC Nürnberg	Magdeburg
13:00	Mathisen 27'; Kaars 72'; Hugonet 78'	Report	Karafiat 5'; Knoche 30' (pen.); Hugonet 33' (o.g.); Justvan 90+4'	Stadium: Avnet Arena; Attendance: 23,883; Referee: Felix Prigan

14 February 2025 22	1. FC Magdeburg	3–0	1. FC Köln	Magdeburg
18:30	Heber 73'; El Hankouri 79'; Loric 90+2'	Report		Stadium: Avnet Arena; Attendance: 27,055; Referee: Florian Exner

22 February 2025 23	Karlsruher SC	3–1	1. FC Magdeburg	Karlsruhe
13:00	Rapp 45+3'; Kobald 48'; Wanitzek 69'	Report	Atik 30'	Stadium: Wildparkstadion; Attendance: 26,148; Referee: Sven Jablonski

2 March 2025 24	1. FC Magdeburg	4–1	SV Darmstadt 98	Magdeburg
13:30	Amaechi 56'; Burcu 73'; El-Zein 78'; Kaars 81'	Report	Hornby 29'	Stadium: Avnet Arena; Attendance: 22,430; Referee: Patrick Alt

8 March 2025 25	SpVgg Greuther Fürth	1–1	1. FC Magdeburg	Fürth
13:00	Futkeu 17'	Report	Atik 20'	Stadium: Sportpark Ronhof Thomas Sommer; Attendance: 12,930; Referee: Timo Gansolweit

14 March 2025 26	1. FC Magdeburg	0–3	Hamburger SV	Magdeburg
18:30		Report	Königsdörffer 9'; Mathisen 15' (o.g.); Königsdörffer 53'	Stadium: Avnet Arena; Attendance: 27,270; Referee: Tobias Stieler

29 March 2025 27	Hannover 96	0–0	1. FC Magdeburg	Hannover
13:00		Report		Stadium: Heinz von Heiden Arena; Attendance: 42,500; Referee: Robin Braun

6 April 2025 28	1. FC Magdeburg	2–0	1. FC Kaiserslautern	Magdeburg
13:30	Atik 29'; Atik 43'	Report		Stadium: Avnet Arena; Attendance: 27,270; Referee: Michael Bacher

12 April 2025 29	SSV Ulm 1846	1–0	1. FC Magdeburg	Ulm
13:00	Telalovic 17'	Report		Stadium: Donaustadion; Attendance: 16,181; Referee: Nicolas Winter

20 April 2025 30	1. FC Magdeburg	3–0	SSV Jahn Regensburg	Magdeburg
13:30	Kaars 28'; El-Zein 51'; Hercher 72'	Report		Stadium: Avnet Arena; Attendance: 26,020; Referee: Deniz Aytekin

25 April 2025 31	Hertha BSC	1–1	1. FC Magdeburg	Berlin
18:30	Gechter 45+2'	Report	Musonda 44'	Stadium: Olympiastadion Berlin; Attendance: 62,057; Referee: Patrick Schwengers

2 May 2025 32	1. FC Magdeburg	0–5	Preußen Münster	Magdeburg
18:30		Report	Hendrix 12'; Lorenz 15'; Lorenz 44' (pen.); Mees 52'; Kyerewaa 54'	Stadium: Avnet Arena; Attendance: 26,800; Referee: Felix Prigan

10 May 2025 33	SC Paderborn	2–1	1. FC Magdeburg	Paderborn
13:00	Brackelmann 41'; Götze 61'	Report	Kaars 15' (pen.)	Stadium: Home Deluxe Arena; Attendance: 15,000; Referee: Martin Petersen

18 May 2025 34	1. FC Magdeburg	4–2	Fortuna Düsseldorf	Magdeburg
15:00	Hugonet 47'; Amaechi 60'; Nollenberger 73'; Kaars 90+2' (pen.)	Report	Zimmermann 19'; Jóhannesson 81'	Stadium: Avnet Arena; Attendance: 27,265; Referee: Patrick Ittrich

=== DFB-Pokal ===
19 August 2024 First round	Kickers Offenbach	2–1	1. FC Magdeburg	Offenbach
18:00	Sorge 31'; Mustafa 74'	Report	Kaars 54'	Stadium: Stadion am Bieberer Berg; Attendance: 16,847; Referee: Patrick Alt
