= Nadjombe =

Nadjombe is a Togolese surname. Notable people with the surname include:

- Jean-Marie Nadjombe (born 2001), Togolese footballer
- Pierre Nadjombe (born 2003), Togolese footballer
