= 2023–24 SV Sandhausen season =

SV Sandhausen
2023–24 season
- Chairman: Jürgen Machmeier
- Head coach: Jens Keller
- Stadium: Hardtwaldstadion
- 3. Liga: 8th
- DFB-Pokal: Second round

The 2023–24 season was SV Sandhausen's 108th season in existence and first season back in the 3. Liga. They also competed in the DFB-Pokal.

== Players ==
=== First-team squad ===
As of 31 August 2023

Note: Flags indicate national team as defined under FIFA eligibility rules; some limited exceptions apply. Players may hold more than one non-FIFA nationality.

No.	Pos.	Nation	Player
1	GK	GER	Nikolai Rehnen
3	DF	GER	Christoph Ehlich
4	DF	GER	Tim Knipping
5	MF	AUT	Lion Schuster
6	MF	TUR	Abu-Bekir El-Zein
7	MF	USA	Joe-Joe Richardson
8	FW	GER	Richard Meier
9	FW	CMR	Franck Evina
10	FW	GER	Rouwen Hennings
11	MF	TUR	Livan Burcu
14	DF	GER	Max Geschwill
15	MF	GER	Alexander Mühling

No.	Pos.	Nation	Player
16	MF	GER	Alexander Fuchs
17	FW	GER	David Otto
18	DF	GER	Dennis Diekmeier (captain)
19	DF	GER	Luca Zander
20	FW	GER	Tim Maciejewski
21	DF	GER	Felix Göttlicher
22	GK	GER	Timo Königsmann
26	MF	MAR	Yassin Ben Balla
27	DF	GER	Lucas Laux (on loan from 1. FSV Mainz 05)
30	GK	GER	Daniel Klein (on loan from FC Augsburg)
31	DF	GER	Jonas Weik
35	DF	GER	Dennis Egel
36	FW	GER	Sebastian Stolze

== Transfers ==
=== In ===
Pos.	Player	Transferred from	Fee	Date	Source

=== Out ===
Pos.	Player	Transferred to	Fee	Date	Source

== Pre-season and friendlies ==
1 July 2023 Friendly	SV Sandhausen (Austria)	8–0	(Germany) TuS Mechtersheim
13:00

10 July 2023 Friendly	SV Sandhausen (Austria)	5–2	(Cyprus) AEZ Zakakiou
18:00

14 July 2023 Friendly	WSG Tirol (Austria)	2–1	(Germany) SV Sandhausen
18:00

19 July 2023 Friendly	SV Sandhausen (Germany)	2–1	(Germany) SV Elversberg
13:00

22 July 2023 Friendly	SV Sandhausen (Germany)	2–1	(Germany) Astoria Walldorf
13:00

29 July 2023 Friendly	SV Sandhausen (Germany)	0–0	(Germany) Darmstadt 98	Tangermünde
15:30				Stadium: Stadion am Wäldchen

== Competitions ==
Competition	First match	Last match	Starting round	Record							
Competition	First match	Last match	Starting round	Pld	W	D	L	GF	GA	GD	Win %
3. Liga	5 August 2023	18 May 2024	Matchday 1	15	5	6	4	21	20	+1	33.33
DFB-Pokal	11 August 2023			1	0	1	0	3	3	+0	0.00
Total				16	5	7	4	24	23	+1	31.25

Last updated: 11 November 2023
Source: Soccerway

=== 3. Liga ===
==== League table ====
Pos	Team	Pld	W	D	L	GF	GA	GD	Pts
6	Erzgebirge Aue	38	16	12	10	51	47	+4	60
7	Rot-Weiss Essen	38	17	8	13	60	53	+7	59
8	SV Sandhausen	38	15	11	12	58	57	+1	56
9	SpVgg Unterhaching	38	16	7	15	50	49	+1	55
10	FC Ingolstadt	38	14	12	12	65	51	+14	54

Source: DFB
Rules for classification: 1) Points; 2) Goal difference; 3) Goals scored; 4) Head-to-head results; 5) Head-to-head away goals scored; 6) Away goals scored; 7) Play-off.

==== Results summary ====
Overall								Home						Away					
Pld	W	D	L	GF	GA	GD	Pts	W	D	L	GF	GA	GD	W	D	L	GF	GA	GD
15	5	6	4	21	20	+1	21	2	3	2	12	11	+1	3	3	2	9	9	0

Last updated: 11 November 2023.

==== Results by round ====
Round	1	2	3	4	5	6	7	8	9	10	11	12	13	14	15	16	17	18
Ground	A	H	A	H	A	H	A	H	A	H	A	H	A	H	A	H	A	H
Result	D	W	L	W	L	L	W	D	W	L	D	D	W	D	D			
Position	12	6	11	4	10	13	10	13	8	10	9	11	7	9	9			

A = Away; H = Home; W = Win; D = Draw; L = Loss

==== Matches ====
The league fixtures were unveiled on 7 July 2023.

25 November 2023 16	SV Sandhausen	v	MSV Duisburg	Sandhausen
14:00 CET (UTC+1)				Stadium: Hardtwaldstadion

2 December 2023 17	Rot-Weiss Essen	v	SV Sandhausen	Essen
14:00 CET (UTC+1)				Stadium: Stadion an der Hafenstraße

9 December 2023 18	SV Sandhausen	v	Waldhof Mannheim	Sandhausen
14:00 CET (UTC+1)				Stadium: Hardtwaldstadion

=== DFB-Pokal ===
11 August 2023 First round	SV Sandhausen	3–3	Hannover 96	Sandhausen
18:00 CEST (UTC+2)				Stadium: Hardtwaldstadion
