= Martijn Kaars =

Dutch footballer (born 1999)

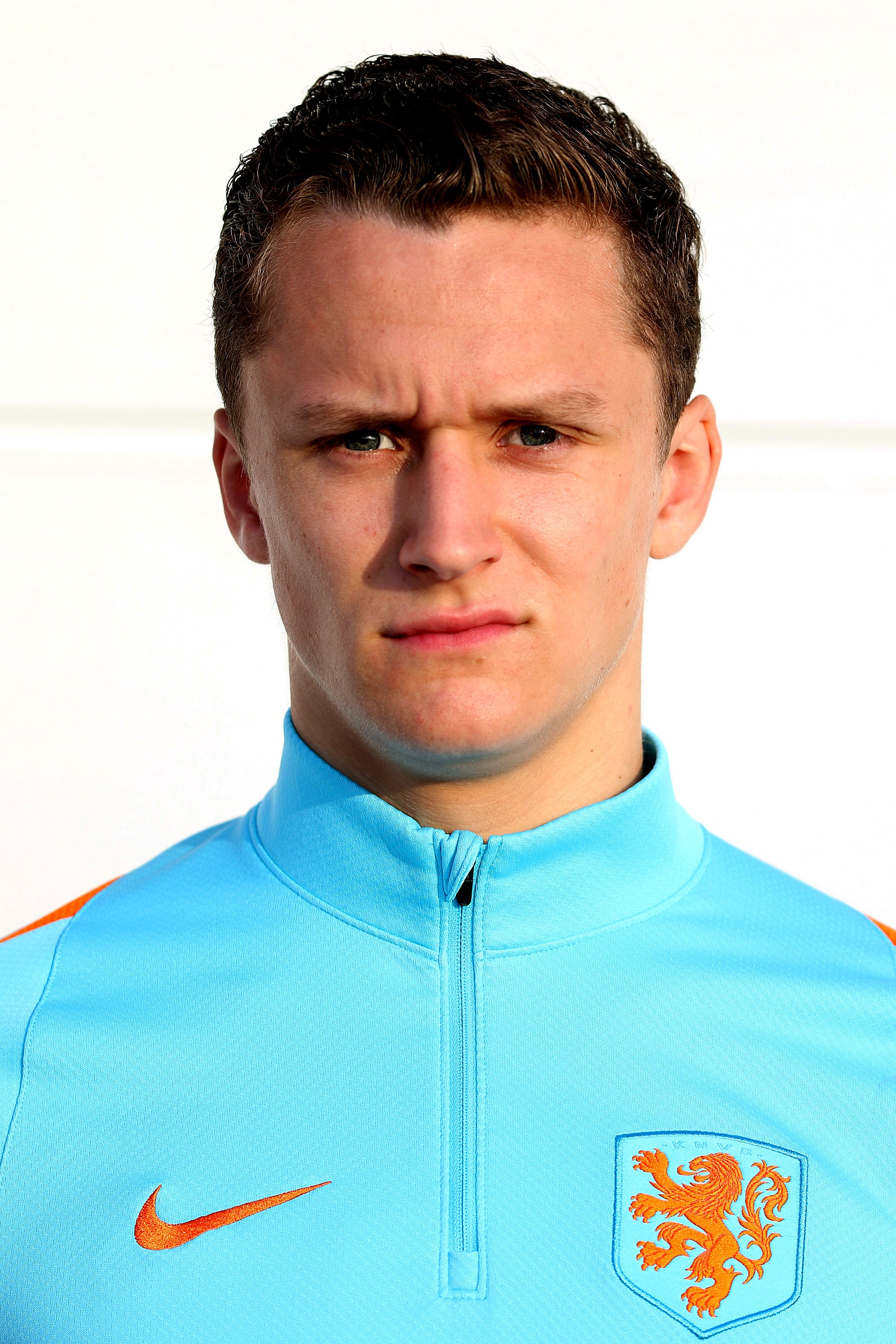
- Kaars for Netherlands U18 in 2017

Personal information
- Date of birth: 5 March 1999 (age 27)
- Place of birth: Monnickendam, Netherlands
- Height: 1.83 m (6 ft 0 in)
- Position: Forward

Team information
- Current team: FC St. Pauli
- Number: 19

Youth career
- 2004–2010: VV Monnickendam
- 2010–2014: Volendam
- 2014–2018: Ajax

Senior career*
Years	Team	Apps	(Gls)
2018–2019	Jong Volendam	30	(21)
2018–2022	Volendam	103	(27)
2022–2024	Helmond Sport	75	(35)
2024–2025	1. FC Magdeburg	36	(21)
2025–	FC St. Pauli	38	(5)

International career
2014	Netherlands U15	2	(0)
2016–2017	Netherlands U18	5	(0)
- * Club domestic league appearances and goals as of 20:30, 23 October 2026 (UTC)

Martijn Kaars (born 5 March 1999) is a Dutch professional footballer who plays as a forward for 2. Bundesliga club FC St. Pauli.

Kaars began his career with VV Monnickendam before joining the youth academies of Volendam and Ajax. He returned to Volendam in 2018 to make his senior debut in the Eerste Divisie, and moved to Helmond Sport in 2022, where he became a regular goalscorer.

In 2024, he transferred to 1. FC Magdeburg for a reported €800,000, the highest fee received by Helmond Sport, and finished his first season as the 2. Bundesliga's second-highest scorer with 19 goals. He joined FC St. Pauli the following year.

== Club career ==
=== Early years ===
Having previously played for his local team VV Monnickendam, Kaars moved to FC Volendam at the age of eleven. He played for four years in the youth teams of the club, before being scouted by the famed Ajax academy. He progressed through the youth teams, and reached Jong Ajax but did not make an appearance for that team.

=== Volendam ===
In June 2018, Kaars returned to Volendam as his contract with Jong Ajax expired. He made his Eerste Divisie debut for Volendam on 17 August 2018 in a game against Den Bosch, as an 80th-minute substitute for Nick Doodeman. He scored his first goal on 25 September 2018 in a 2–1 loss in the KNVB Cup against Willem II. His first league goal followed three days later, as he secured the 2–2 draw in an away match against Helmond Sport after an assist by Teije ten Den.

=== Helmond Sport ===
On 7 April 2022, Helmond Sport announced the signing of Kaars on a three-year contract, with him joining the club from the 2022–23 season. He made his competitive debut for the club on the first matchday of the season, playing the full game against NAC Breda which was lost 1–0. His first goal came in the following match against Jong AZ on 12 August, where he made the equaliser as Helmond suffered a 3–1 home defeat at De Braak. On 2 September, Kaars scored a brace in a 3–0 victory against Almere City.

=== 1. FC Magdeburg ===
On 17 June 2024, Kaars joined 2. Bundesliga side 1. FC Magdeburg for a reported fee of around €800,000, a sum that made him the most expensive departure in Helmond Sport's history. He made his competitive debut on 3 August 2024, starting in a 0–0 home draw with SV Elversberg. A week later he scored his first goals for the club, a brace in a 3–1 win away to Eintracht Braunschweig. He registered his first DFB-Pokal goal on 19 August 2024, equalising in a 2–1 first-round defeat at Kickers Offenbach. After the winter break he scored a hat-trick in a 5–2 victory at Elversberg on 19 January 2025, before hitting four goals in a 5–2 win away to FC Schalke 04 on 1 February 2025. In his first season with the club, he scored 19 goals in the league and provided six assists, finishing as the second-highest goalscorer in the competition behind Davie Selke.

=== FC St. Pauli ===
On 28 August 2025, Kaars signed for Bundesliga club FC St. Pauli on undisclosed terms. The transfer quickly became a media focal point when an e-mail detailing the offer was inadvertently photographed from the laptop of 1. FC Magdeburg's sporting director and leaked online; Magdeburg subsequently filed a criminal complaint in response.

He made his debut the following day in the Hamburg derby, replacing Andréas Hountondji in the 69th minute of a 2–0 away win over Hamburger SV at the Volksparkstadion. On 2 December 2025, he scored his first goal for die Kiezkicker, also providing an assist, in a 2–1 away victory over Borussia Mönchengladbach in the round of 16 of the DFB-Pokal. Eleven days later, he scored his first goals in the Bundesliga, netting twice in a 2–1 home win against 1. FC Heidenheim.

== Career statistics ==
As of match played 23 October 2026

Appearances and goals by club, season and competition
Club	Season	League			Cup		Other		Total	
Club	Season	Division	Apps	Goals	Apps	Goals	Apps	Goals	Apps	Goals
Jong Volendam	2018–19	Derde Divisie	25	19	—		—		25	19
Jong Volendam	2019–20	Tweede Divisie	5	2	—		—		5	2
Jong Volendam	Total		30	21	—		—		30	21
Volendam	2018–19	Eerste Divisie	15	1	1	1	—		16	2
Volendam	2019–20	Eerste Divisie	27	11	1	0	—		28	11
Volendam	2020–21	Eerste Divisie	32	11	1	0	1 (Note: Appearance in Eerste Divisie promotion play-offs)	0	34	11
Volendam	2021–22	Eerste Divisie	29	4	1	0	—		30	4
Volendam	Total		103	27	4	1	1	0	108	28
Helmond Sport	2022–23	Eerste Divisie	37	14	1	0	—		38	14
Helmond Sport	2023–24	Eerste Divisie	38	21	1	0	—		39	21
Helmond Sport	Total		75	35	2	0	—		77	35
1. FC Magdeburg	2024–25	2. Bundesliga	33	19	1	1	—		34	20
1. FC Magdeburg	2025–26	2. Bundesliga	3	2	1	1	—		4	3
1. FC Magdeburg	Total		36	21	2	2	—		38	23
FC St. Pauli	2025–26	Bundesliga	29	3	3	1	—		32	4
FC St. Pauli	2026–27	2. Bundesliga	9	2	1	0	—		10	2
FC St. Pauli	Total		38	5	4	1	—		42	6
Career total			282	109	12	4	1	0	295	113

== Honours ==
Jong Volendam

- Derde Divisie – Sunday: 2018–19
