= Herbert Bockhorn =

Ugandan footballer (born 1995)

Personal information
- Full name: Herbert Bockhorn
- Date of birth: 31 January 1995 (age 31)
- Place of birth: Kampala, Uganda
- Height: 1.77 m (5 ft 10 in)
- Position: Right-back

Team information
- Current team: 1. FC Magdeburg
- Number: 7

Youth career
- 2000–2002: TSV Melsdorf
- 2002–2006: FC Kilia Kiel
- 2006–2014: Werder Bremen

Senior career*
Years	Team	Apps	(Gls)
2014–2015	Werder Bremen III	5	(1)
2014–2015	Werder Bremen II	10	(0)
2015–2016	SC Wiedenbrück	28	(0)
2016–2019	Borussia Dortmund II	71	(11)
2019–2020	Huddersfield Town	0	(0)
2020–2022	VfL Bochum	42	(1)
2022–	1. FC Magdeburg	69	(4)

International career^{‡}
2026–	Uganda	1	(0)
- * Club domestic league appearances and goals as of 18 May 2026 ‡ National team caps and goals as of 00:19, 15 November 2026 (UTC)

Herbert Bockhorn (born 31 January 1995) is a Ugandan professional footballer who plays as a right-back for 2. Bundesliga club 1. FC Magdeburg and the Uganda national team.

== Club career ==
=== Youth career ===
Bockhorn started playing football from TSV Melsdorf and FC Kilia Kiel before joining Werder Bremen's youth where he played for the U17 and U19 teams.

=== Werder Bremen III, II and SC Wiedenbrück 2000 ===
Bockhorn joined Werder Bremen's second reserves from the club's U19 team. He made his senior debut on 27 August 2014 against SG Aumund-Vegesack. On 21 September 2014 Bockhorn played his first game with the Werder Bremen's reserves against TSV Havelse. Bockhorn joined SC Wiedenbrück 2000 from Werder Bremen II. He made his debut on 1 August 2015 against Rot-Weiss Essen.

=== Borussia Dortmund II ===
Bockhorn joined Borussia Dortmund II in 2016. He made his debut on 12 August 2016 against Rot-Weiß Oberhausen. He scored his first goal on 27 August 2017 against Borussia Mönchengladbach II. Bockhorn played for Borussia Dortmund's senior team on two occasions: on 22 July 2018 at Bank of America Stadium. He played against Liverpool during International Champions Cup.

=== Huddersfield Town ===
In July 2019, Bockhorn moved to English club Huddersfield Town, reuniting him with manager Jan Siewert, who had coached Bockhorn during his time with Borussia Dortmund's reserves. On 13 August 2019, Bockhorn made his debut for Huddersfield Town, in the first round of the EFL Cup against Lincoln City. However, on 16 August, Siewert was sacked; Bockhorn's services fell out of favour under new manager Danny Cowley, and he departed the club at the end of the season, without making a league appearance.

=== VfL Bochum ===
In July 2020 Bockhorn signed a one-year contract with VfL Bochum.

=== 1. FC Magdeburg ===
In September 2022 Bockhorn joined 2. Bundesliga club 1. FC Magdeburg as a free agent.

== International career ==
On 9 March 2019, Bockhorn was invited by Uganda national team head coach Sébastien Desabre to be part of the final team preparing for the final 2019 Africa Cup of Nations qualifying game against Tanzania.

He was called up in September 2025 for 2026 FIFA World Cup qualification matches against Mozambique and Somalia but had to withdraw due to illness.

Bockhorn was again on the verge of making his debut for Uganda in June 2026, having been named to the squad for a friendly match against Tanzania, but the match was called off due to the an Ebola outbreak in central Africa.

== Personal life ==
Bockhorn was born to a Ugandan mother, Jean Marion Nansubuga, and a German father, Hartwig Bockhorn. Later the family moved to Germany, where Bockhorn started his career as a footballer at TSV Melsdorf.

== Career statistics ==
As of 1 July 2026

Appearances and goals by club, season and competition
Club	Season	League			National cup		League cup		Other		Total	
Club	Season	Division	Apps	Goals	Apps	Goals	Apps	Goals	Apps	Goals	Apps	Goals
Werder Bremen III	2014–15	Verbandsliga Bremen	5	1	—		—		—		5	1
Werder Bremen II	2014–15	Regionalliga Nord	10	0	—		—		0 (Note: Appearances in the Regionalliga promotion play-offs)	0	10	0
SC Wiedenbrück 2000	2015–16	Regionalliga West	28	0	—		—		—		28	0
Borussia Dortmund II	2016–17	Regionalliga West	17	0	—		—		—		17	0
Borussia Dortmund II	2017–18	Regionalliga West	28	7	—		—		—		28	7
Borussia Dortmund II	2018–19	Regionalliga West	26	4	—		—		—		26	4
Borussia Dortmund II	Total		71	11	—		—		—		71	11
Huddersfield Town	2019–20	Championship	0	0	0	0	1	0	—		1	0
VfL Bochum	2020–21	2. Bundesliga	24	1	2	0	—		—		26	1
VfL Bochum	2021–22	Bundesliga	18	0	0	0	—		—		18	0
VfL Bochum	Total		42	1	2	0	—		—		44	1
1. FC Magdeburg	2022–23	2. Bundesliga	25	1	0	0	—		—		25	1
1. FC Magdeburg	2023–24	2. Bundesliga	28	3	3	1	—		—		31	4
1. FC Magdeburg	2024–25	2. Bundesliga	1	0	0	0	—		—		1	0
1. FC Magdeburg	2025–26	2. Bundesliga	15	0	2	0	—		—		17	0
1. FC Magdeburg	2026–27	2. Bundesliga	0	0	0	0	—		0	0	0	0
1. FC Magdeburg	Total		69	4	5	1	—		—		74	5
Career total			225	17	7	1	1	0	0	0	233	18
