= Abu-Bekir El-Zein =

Footballer (born 2003)

Personal information
- Full name: Abu-Bekir Ömer El-Zein
- Date of birth: 18 February 2003 (age 23)
- Place of birth: Essen, Germany
- Height: 1.79 m (5 ft 10 in)
- Position: Midfielder

Team information
- Current team: SSV Ulm
- Number: 26

Youth career
- –2013: ESC Preußen 02
- 2013–2018: Schwarz-Weiß Essen
- 2018–2022: Borussia Dortmund

Senior career*
| Years | Team | Apps | (Gls) |
| 2022–2024 | SV Sandhausen | 43 | (3) |
| 2024–2026 | 1. FC Magdeburg II | 13 | (3) |
| 2024–2026 | 1. FC Magdeburg | 23 | (2) |
| 2026– | SSV Ulm | 13 | (1) |
- * Club domestic league appearances and goals as of 30 May 2026

Abu-Bekir Ömer El-Zein (born 18 February 2003) is a professional footballer who plays as a midfielder for club SSV Ulm. Born in Germany, he has opted to play for Turkey internationally.

== Career ==
Born in Essen, Germany, El-Zein played youth football for ESC Preußen 02, Schwarz-Weiß Essen and Borussia Dortmund, winning the Under 19 Bundesliga with the latter in 2022.

El-Zein signed for 2. Bundesliga club SV Sandhausen in July 2022 after a trial period with the club. After 13 2. Bundesliga appearances during the 2022–23 season, he extended his Sandhausen contract until 2025 in summer 2023. During the 2023–24 season, El-Zein made 30 3. Liga appearances for Sandhausen; his contract was terminated at the end of the season.

In July 2024, El-Zein signed for 2. Bundesliga club 1. FC Magdeburg following a successful trial period with the club. He played 23 games in the 2024–25 2. Bundesliga, scoring once, while the following season he played 12 games for the reserve team, scoring twice, in the 2025–26 Regionalliga Nordost.

On 2 January 2025, El-Zein moved to SSV Ulm in the 3. Liga on a contract valid until 30 June 2027.

== International career ==
Born in Germany, El-Zein is of Lebanese descent from his father and Turkish descent from his mother. On 8 November 2024, he was named in Turkey's preliminary under-20 squad for their upcoming Under 20 Elite League matches.

== Career statistics ==
As of match played 26 November 2025

Appearances and goals by club, season and competition
| Club | Season | League | | | DFB-Pokal | | Other | | Total | |
| Club | Season | Division | Apps | Goals | Apps | Goals | Apps | Goals | Apps | Goals |
|---|---|---|---|---|---|---|---|---|---|---|
| SV Sandhausen | 2022–23 | 2. Bundesliga | 13 | 0 | 1 | 0 | — | | 14 | 0 |
| SV Sandhausen | 2023–24 | 3. Liga | 30 | 3 | 2 | 0 | 4 (Note: Appearances in the Baden Cup) | 1 | 36 | 4 |
| SV Sandhausen | Total | | 43 | 3 | 3 | 0 | 4 | 1 | 50 | 4 |
| 1. FC Magdeburg II | 2024–25 | Oberliga Nordost-Süd | 1 | 1 | — | | — | | 1 | 1 |
| 1. FC Magdeburg II | 2025–26 | Regionalliga Nordost | 12 | 2 | — | | — | | 12 | 2 |
| 1. FC Magdeburg II | Total | | 13 | 3 | 0 | 0 | 0 | 0 | 13 | 3 |
| 1. FC Magdeburg | 2024–25 | 2. Bundesliga | 23 | 2 | 1 | 0 | — | | 24 | 2 |
| 1. FC Magdeburg | 2025–26 | 2. Bundesliga | 0 | 0 | 0 | 0 | — | | 0 | 0 |
| 1. FC Magdeburg | Total | | 23 | 2 | 1 | 0 | 0 | 0 | 24 | 2 |
| SSV Ulm | 2025–26 | 3. Liga | 0 | 0 | — | | — | | 0 | 0 |
| Career total | | | 79 | 8 | 4 | 0 | 4 | 1 | 87 | 9 |

== Honours ==
1. FC Magdeburg II

- Oberliga Nordost-Süd: 2024–25
