= Jean-Marie Nadjombe =

Togolese footballer

Personal information
- Full name: Jean-Marie Bertrand Nadjombe
- Date of birth: 6 September 2001 (age 25)
- Place of birth: Cologne, Germany
- Height: 1.82 m (6 ft 0 in)
- Position: Left-back

Team information
- Current team: Chemie Leipzig
- Number: 29

Youth career
- 2014–2020: Fortuna Köln

Senior career*
Years	Team	Apps	(Gls)
2020–2023	Fortuna Köln	61	(0)
2023–2025	Mainz 05 II	42	(1)
2025–	Chemie Leipzig	19	(0)

International career^{‡}
2021–	Togo	1	(0)
- * Club domestic league appearances and goals as of 22 June 2026 ‡ National team caps and goals as of 22:37, 1 September 2021 (UTC)

Jean-Marie Bertrand Nadjombe (born 6 September 2001) is a professional footballer who plays as a left-back for Chemie Leipzig. Born in Germany, he represents the Togo national team.

== Club career ==
Nadjombe joined the youth academy of Fortuna Köln, and worked his way up through all their junior levels. On 2 June 2020, he signed his first professional contract with the club.

== International career ==
Nadjombe was born in Cologne, Germany to Togolese parents. He debuted with the Togo national team in a 2–0 2022 FIFA World Cup qualification loss to Senegal national team on 1 September 2021.

== Personal life ==
Jean-Marie is the older brother of Pierre Nadjombe, also a professional footballer.
