= Alsu =

Alsu is a feminine given name. Notable people with the name include:

- Alsu Abdullina (born 2001), Russian footballer
- Alsu Kurmasheva (born 1976), Russian and American journalist
- Alsu Minazova (born 1998), Russian slalom canoeist
- Alsu Murtazina (born 1987), Russian triple jumper

== See also ==
- Alsou (born 1983), Russian singer
