= Noah Pesch =

Croatian footballer

Personal information
- Full name: Noah Phil Pesch
- Date of birth: 18 May 2005 (age 21)
- Place of birth: Eschweiler, Germany
- Height: 1.81 m (5 ft 11 in)
- Position: Winger

Team information
- Current team: Rot-Weiss Essen
- Number: 11

Youth career
- 2010–2014: Bayer Leverkusen

Senior career*
Years	Team	Apps	(Gls)
2024–2025	Borussia Mönchengladbach II	27	(19)
2025–2026	Borussia Mönchengladbach	1	(0)
2025–2026	→ 1. FC Magdeburg (loan)	19	(2)
2026–	Rot-Weiss Essen	0	(0)

International career^{‡}
2019	Croatia U15	2	(0)
2021	Croatia U18	3	(0)
2021–2024	Croatia U19	5	(0)
2025–	Croatia U21	1	(0)
- * Club domestic league appearances and goals as of 18 May 2026 ‡ National team caps and goals as of 20 April 2025

Noah Phil Pesch (born 20 April 2005) is a professional footballer who plays as a winger for 3. Liga club Rot-Weiss Essen. Born in Germany, he plays for the Croatia national under-21 football team.

== Club career ==
Pesch began his youth career at Bayer Leverkusen in 2010, where he would stay for 14 years before leaving for Borussia Mönchengladbach, and would begin to play for the reserve team in the Regionalliga West. He made his debut in a 4–2 away win over Rot-Weiß Oberhausen, scoring 2 goals. Pesch would continue this goalscoring form over the following months, scoring 17 goals in 20 league games, including a hat-trick in a 6–4 win over Eintracht Hohkeppel. Pesch wpuld finish the season as top scorer in the league with 19 goals.

Pesch would make his debut for the first team in March, coming on as a late substitute in a 3-1 Bundesliga loss to Mainz 05.

In July 2025, Pesch signed for 2. Bundesliga side 1. FC Magdeburg on a season-long loan.

On 3 July 2026, Pesch joined Rot-Weiss Essen in 3. Liga.

== International career ==
Pesch represents Croatia internationally, and has made 5 appearances for the U19, as well as one appearance in a friendly match for the U21 team.

== Career statistics ==
=== Club ===
As of match played 9 May 2026

Appearances and goals by club, season and competition
Club	Season	League			National cup		Continental		Other		Total	
Club	Season	Division	Apps	Goals	Apps	Goals	Apps	Goals	Apps	Goals	Apps	Goals
Borussia Mönchengladbach II	2024–25	Regionalliga West	30	20	0	0	—		3 (Note: Appearances in Premier League Cup)	1	33	21
Borussia Mönchengladbach	2024–25	Bundesliga	1	0	—		—		—		1	0
1. FC Magdeburg (loan)	2025–26	2. Bundesliga	19	2	3	1	—		—		22	3
Rot-Weiss Essen	2025–27	3. Liga	0	0	0	0	—		—		0	0
Career total			50	22	3	1	0	0	3	1	56	24
