= Philipp Hercher =

German footballer

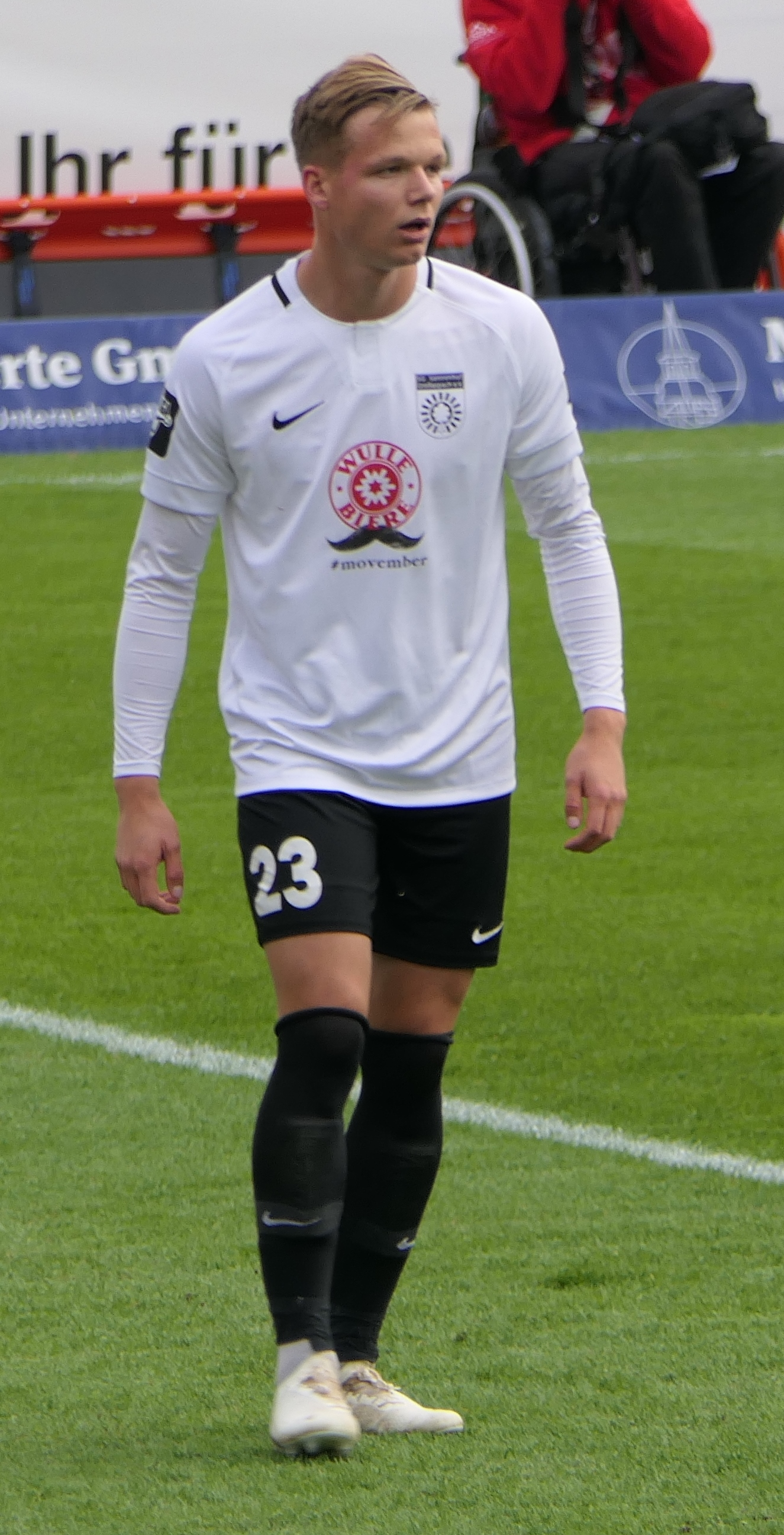
- Hercher with SG Sonnenhof Großaspach in 2018

Personal information
- Date of birth: 21 March 1996 (age 30)
- Place of birth: Rheinfelden, Germany
- Height: 1.82 m (6 ft 0 in)
- Position: Right-back

Team information
- Current team: Wehen Wiesbaden
- Number: 29

Youth career
- 2006–2011: Jahn Regensburg
- 2011–2015: 1. FC Nürnberg

Senior career*
Years	Team	Apps	(Gls)
2015–2018	1. FC Nürnberg II	60	(23)
2015–2016	1. FC Nürnberg	3	(0)
2017	→ VfR Aalen (loan)	7	(0)
2018–2019	SG Sonnenhof Großaspach	37	(5)
2019–2024	1. FC Kaiserslautern	125	(18)
2024–2026	1. FC Magdeburg	58	(7)
2026–	Wehen Wiesbaden	0	(0)
- * Club domestic league appearances and goals as of 18 May 2026

Philipp Hercher (born 21 March 1996) is a German professional footballer who plays as a right-back for 3. Liga club Wehen Wiesbaden.

== Career ==
Hercher is a youth exponent from 1. FC Nürnberg. He made his 2. Bundesliga debut on 29 November 2015 against FC St. Pauli replacing Tim Leibold after 88 minutes in a 4–0 away win.

In June 2024, Hercher joined 1. FC Magdeburg.

On 29 June 2026, Hercher signed with Wehen Wiesbaden in 3. Liga.
