= Rayan Ghrieb =

French footballer (born 1999)

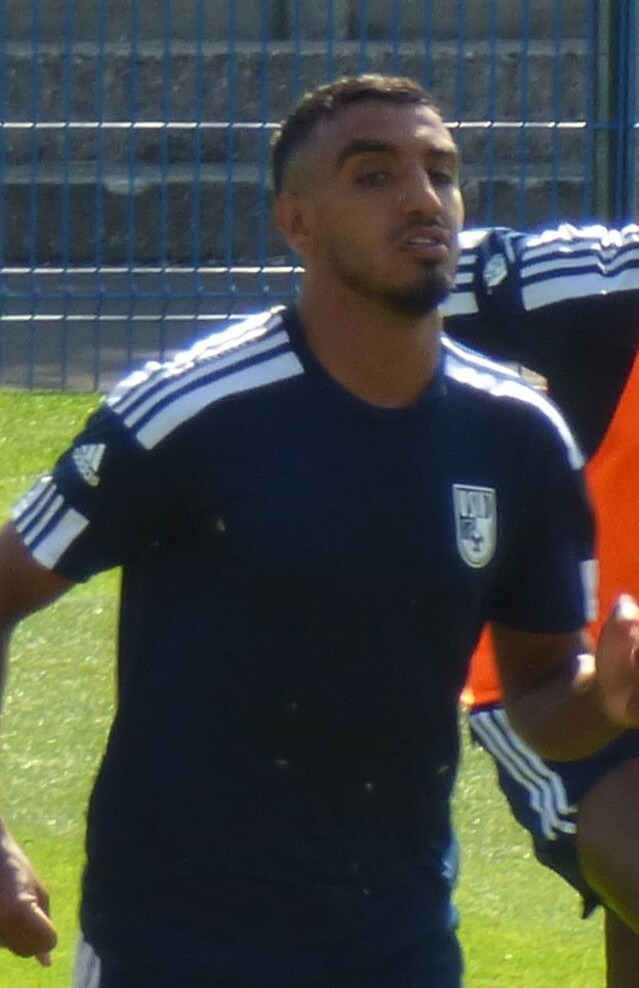
- Ghrieb in 2023

Personal information
- Date of birth: 21 April 1999 (age 27)
- Place of birth: Strasbourg, France
- Height: 1.82 m (6 ft 0 in)
- Position: Attacking midfielder

Team information
- Current team: 1. FC Nürnberg
- Number: 7

Youth career
- 2010–2012: ASPV Strasbourg
- 2012–2014: Schiltigheim
- 2014–2015: FC Geispolsheim
- 2015–2017: Offenburger FV

Senior career*
Years	Team	Apps	(Gls)
2017–2018	Sedan	10	(0)
2018–2019	Le Mans II	12	(7)
2019–2020	Toulon	15	(1)
2020–2021	Oberachern	8	(2)
2021–2022	Schiltigheim	28	(14)
2022–2024	Dunkerque	59	(16)
2024–2025	Guingamp	28	(9)
2025–2026	1. FC Magdeburg	27	(4)
2026–	1. FC Nürnberg	0	(0)
- * Club domestic league appearances and goals as of 18 May 2026

Rayan Ghrieb (born 21 April 1999) is a French professional footballer who plays as an attacking midfielder for German 2. Bundesliga club 1. FC Nürnberg.

== Career ==
Ghrieb is a youth product of the French clubs ASPV Strasbourg and Schiltigheim, and the German clubs Geispolsheim and Offenburger FV. He began his senior career with Sedan in 2017. He had a short stint with the reserves of Le Mans the following season, before moving to Toulon in the winter break of 2018. He followed that up with a short stint with Oberachern in the German Oberliga due to the COVID-19 pandemic. He returned to France with Schiltigheim for the 2021–22 season, and had a strong season with 14 goals in 28 games.

Ghrieb then transferred to Dunkerque in the Championnat National for the 2022–23 season, and again scored 14 goals plus 8 assists in 33 games to help achieve second place and earn promotion to the Ligue 2. He was named the "Championnat National Player of the Season" for his performances. He scored a brace in his first professional game, with Dunkerque in a 2–2 Ligue 2 tie with Troyes on 5 August 2023.

On 7 August 2025, Ghrieb signed with 1. FC Magdeburg in the 2. Bundesliga.

On 22 May 2026, Ghrieb moved to 1. FC Nürnberg, also in 2. Bundesliga.

== Personal life ==
Born in France, Ghrieb holds both French and Algerian nationalities.

== Career statistics ==
As of 10 January 2025

Appearances and goals by club, season and competition
Club	Season	League			National cup		Europe		Other		Total	
Club	Season	Division	Apps	Goals	Apps	Goals	Apps	Goals	Apps	Goals	Apps	Goals
Offenburger FV	2016–17	Oberliga Baden-Württemberg	4	0	–		–		–		4	0
Sedan	2017–18	Championnat National 2	10	0	–		–		–		10	0
Le Mans II	2018–19	Championnat National 3	12	7	–		–		–		12	7
Toulon	2018–19	Championnat National 2	10	1	–		–		–		10	1
Toulon	2019–20	Championnat National	5	0	1	0	–		–		6	0
Toulon	Total		15	1	1	0	0	0	0	0	16	1
Oberachern	2020–21	Oberliga Baden-Württemberg	8	2	1	1	–		–		9	3
Schiltigheim	2021–22	Championnat National 2	28	14	3	1	–		–		31	15
Dunkerque	2022–23	Championnat National	33	14	3	3	–		–		36	17
Dunkerque	2023–24	Ligue 2	26	2	0	0	–		–		26	2
Dunkerque	Total		59	16	3	3	0	0	0	0	62	19
Guingamp	2024–25	Ligue 2	14	3	1	0	–		–		15	3
Career total			150	43	9	5	0	0	0	0	159	48
