= Avnet Arena =

Multi-purpose stadium in Magdeburg, Germany

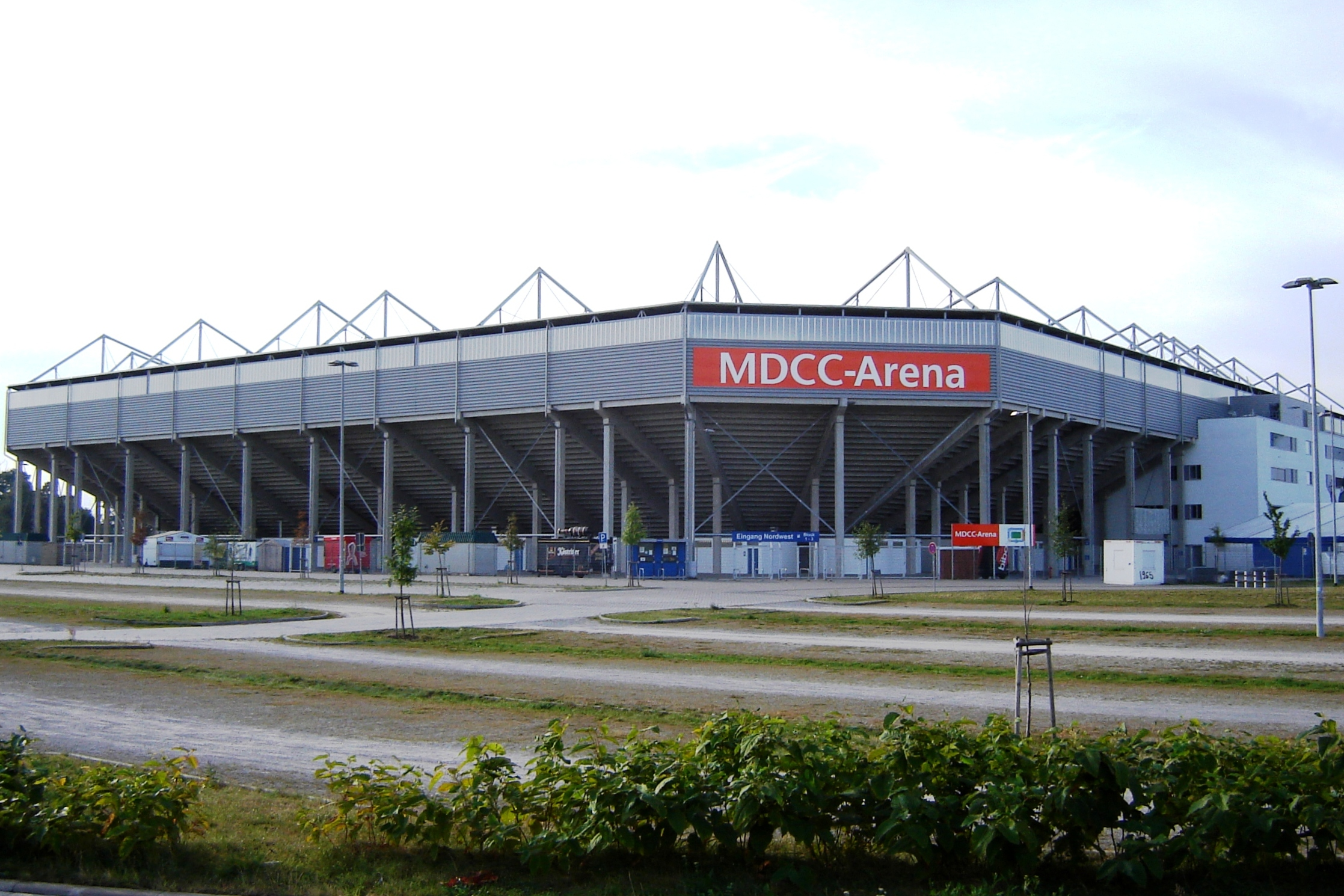
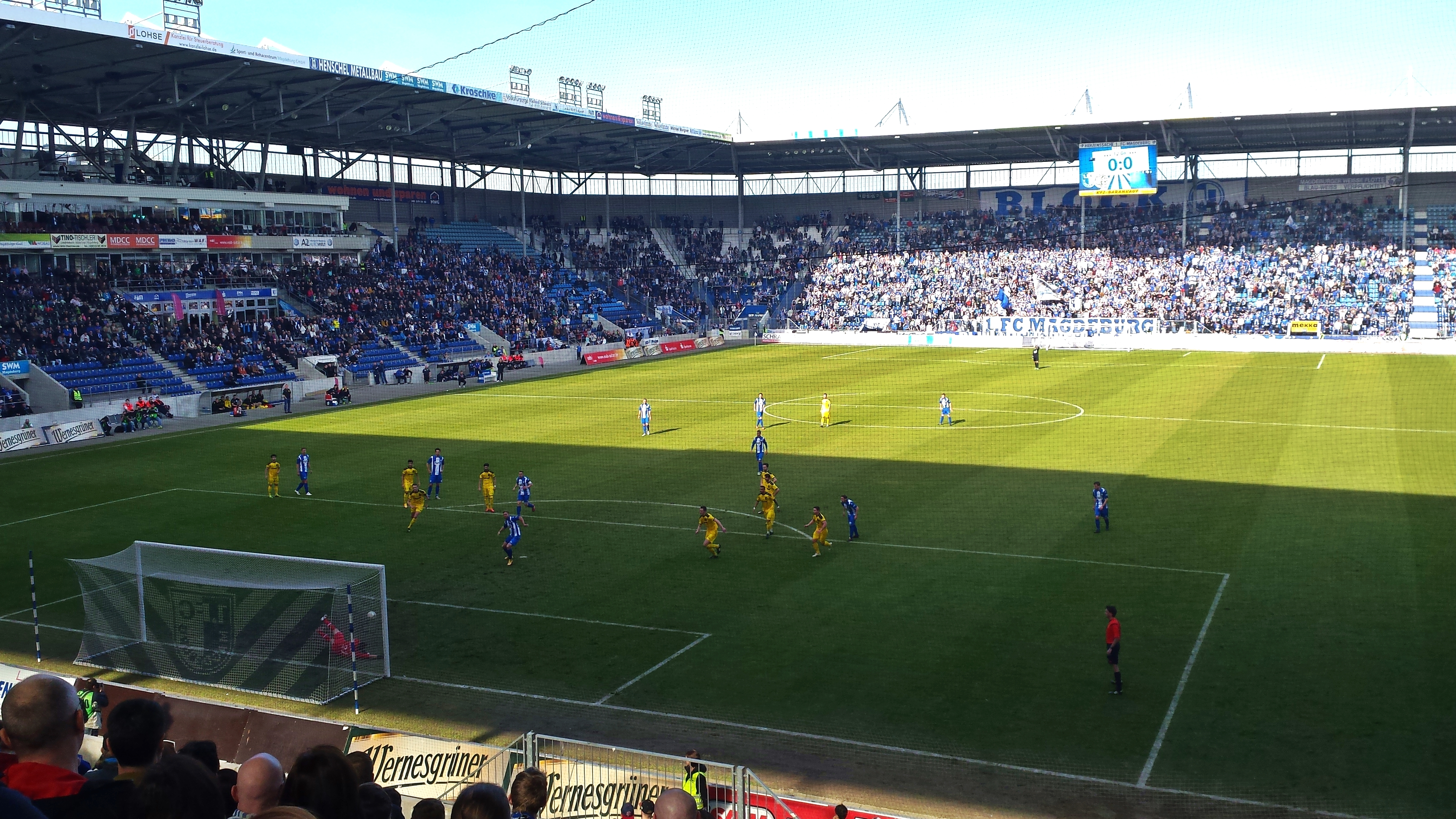
- Interactive map of Avnet Arena
- Former names: Stadion Magdeburg (2006–2009); MDCC-Arena (2009–2024)
- Location: Magdeburg, Germany
- Coordinates: 52°07′32″N 11°40′15″E
- Owner: City of Magdeburg
- Operator: MVGM Messe- und Veranstaltungsgesellschaft
- Capacity: 30,098
- Surface: Grass
- Field size: 105 × 68 m

Construction
- Built: 2005–2006
- Opened: 19 December 2006
- Cost: €31 million

Tenants
- 1. FC Magdeburg (2006–present); Germany national football team (selected matches)

Avnet Arena is a multi-purpose stadium in Magdeburg, Germany. It has been completed and opened to the public in December 2006, replacing the old Ernst-Grube-Stadion. It is mostly used for football matches and hosts the home matches of 1. FC Magdeburg.

In European competitions, the stadium is known as 1. FC Magdeburg Arena due to advertising rules.

== Stadium Facts ==
The stadium is a fully covered football-only stadium, i.e. without an athletics track. It has a capacity of 30,098 people. The stadium has 64 seats for persons with disabilities. Furthermore, 40 press seats are available. The maximum distance from the pitch is 32 meters. The floodlight is attached to the stadium's roof, as well as the two 30m^{2} screens. The pitch is 105 metres (115 yards) long and 68 metres (74 yards) wide, it has under-soil heating. Total cost of construction was €31 million. In the 2016–17 3. Liga season, Magdeburg drew the highest average home attendance (17,100), followed by MSV Duisburg (14,175) and Hansa Rostock (11,433).

== History ==
The first stadium at this location had been inaugurated on 14 April 1912 as the home of SV Victoria 96 Magdeburg. In 1914, it hosted the final to the German championship between Spielvereinigung Fürth and VfB Leipzig. In 1937 it was bought by the Allianz insurance company after Victoria had gone bankrupt. During World War II the stadium was completely destroyed by bombing.

After World War II the city of Magdeburg planned to erect a sports center consisting among others of a stadium with a capacity for 80,000 people and a natatorium. However, the city was unable to acquire the site originally intended and so the project was abandoned. Instead, the city decided to build a new stadium east of the Elbe river, at the site of the Victoria stadium. In order to erect the stands, about 5.3 million cubic ft of rubble were transported from the ruins of the city. The stadium was equipped with an athletics track and was opened in front of a crowd of 40,000 on 18 September 1955. Over the years, it was upgraded several times, parts of the stands were put under a roof, and floodlights were installed. However, after the reunification of Germany the stadium fell into disrepair and in 2004 the city council decided to build a new one at the same site. The Ernst-Grube-Stadion was demolished between March and June 2005, and construction of the new stadium began on 4 July 2005.

The first match was held on 19 December 2006. In front of a crowd of 13,279 spectators, hosts 1. FC Magdeburg came to a nil-all draw against Eintracht Braunschweig. In the inaugural match, 1. FC Magdeburg lost 0–3 to Bundesliga side SV Werder Bremen, this time 24,300 spectators had come. In the remaining matches of the season, 10,800 spectators came to see 1. FC Magdeburg play on average. The first international match was held on 29 July 2007 when the German women's national team beat their Danish counterparts 4–0 in front of 10,735 spectators.

In 2009, the stadium hosted the 2009 UEFA European Under-17 Football Championship final.

In July 2009, local Internet service provider and cable TV company MDCC announced they had signed a five-year sponsorship agreement with the stadium operator under which the stadium would be known as MDCC-Arena.

On 20 October 2010, the American Football Association of Germany announced that the German Bowl, the championship game of the German Football League, would be held in the MDCC-Arena for three iterations, beginning with the 2011 championship.

The kick-off spot grass patch from the 2014–15 Regionalliga promotion round match against Kickers Offenbach on 27 May 2015, was auctioned on eBay on 30 May 2016. The money raised was used for the development of 1. FC Magdeburg's youth team.

Following a refurbishment of the guest terraces and seating in early 2016, the stadium capacity was reduced to 25,910, including 21,510 seats. Since the completion of the stadium extension in January 2020, the official capacity is 30,098.

In March 2024 it was announced that the US electronics company Avnet would become the new sponsoring partner. The complex was officially renamed Avnet Arena prior to the 2024–25 2. Bundesliga season.

== Gallery ==
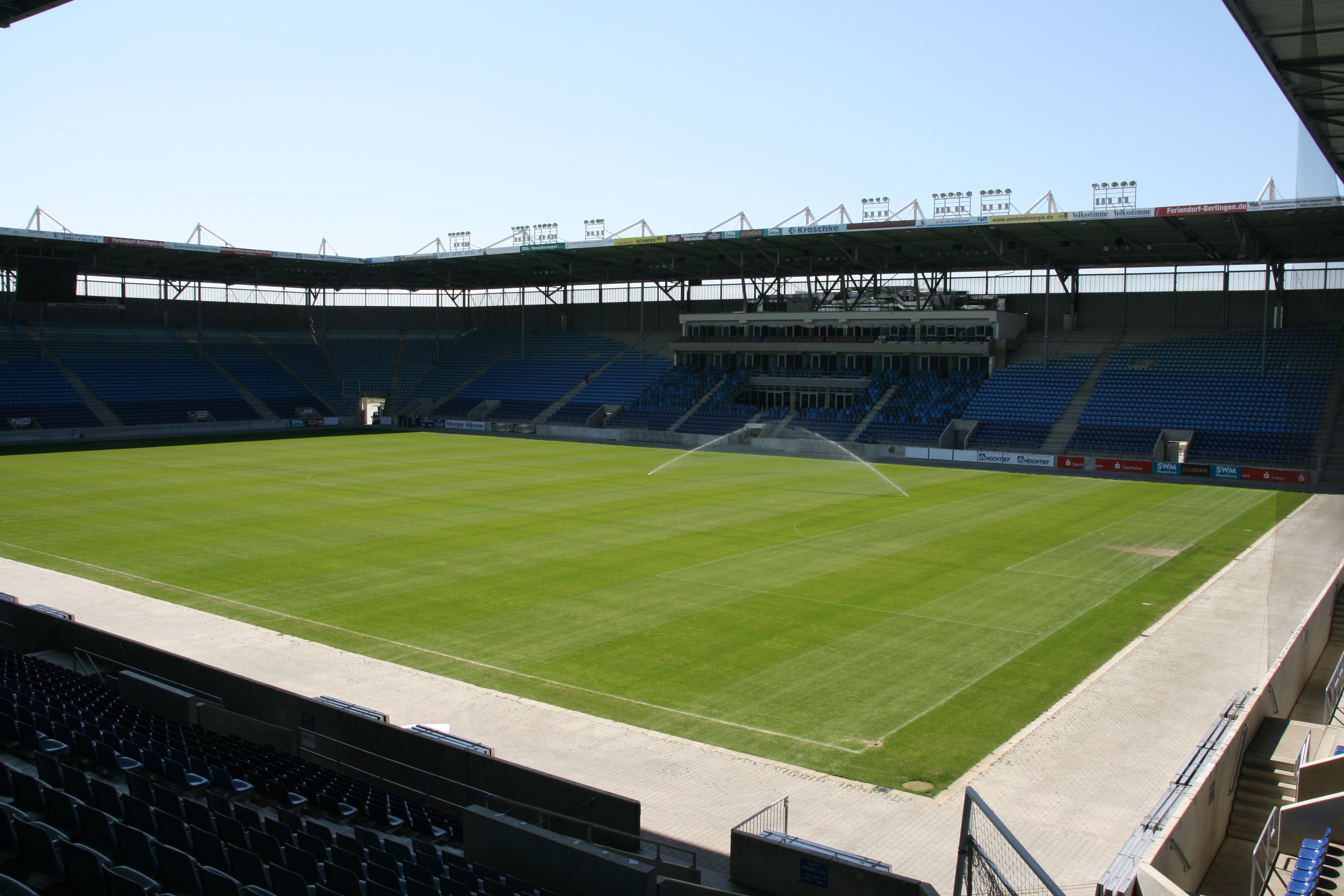
Stadium interior

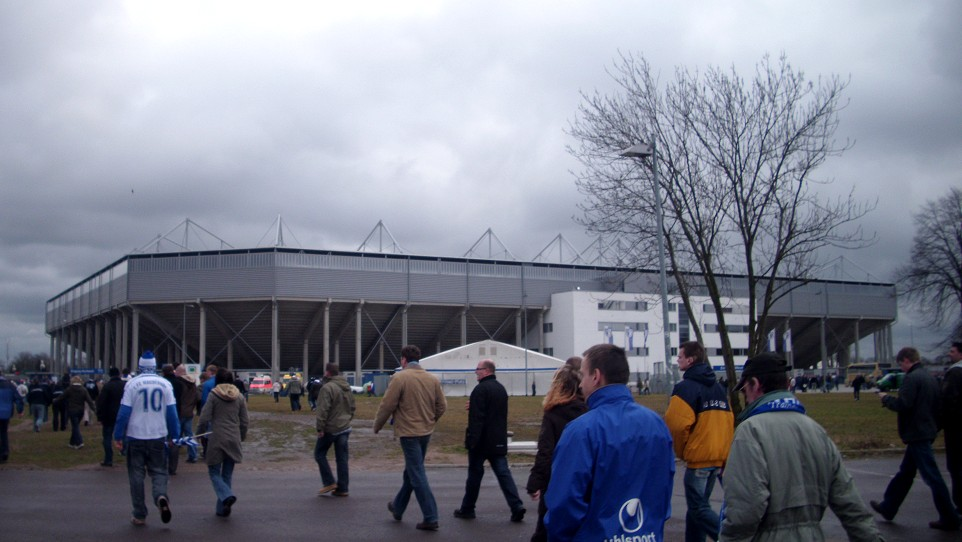
View towards the west facade

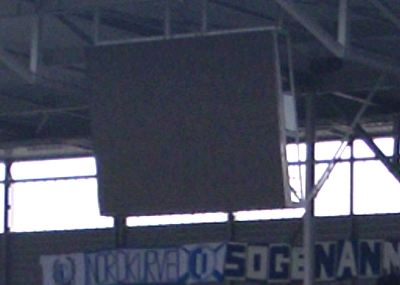
Score board

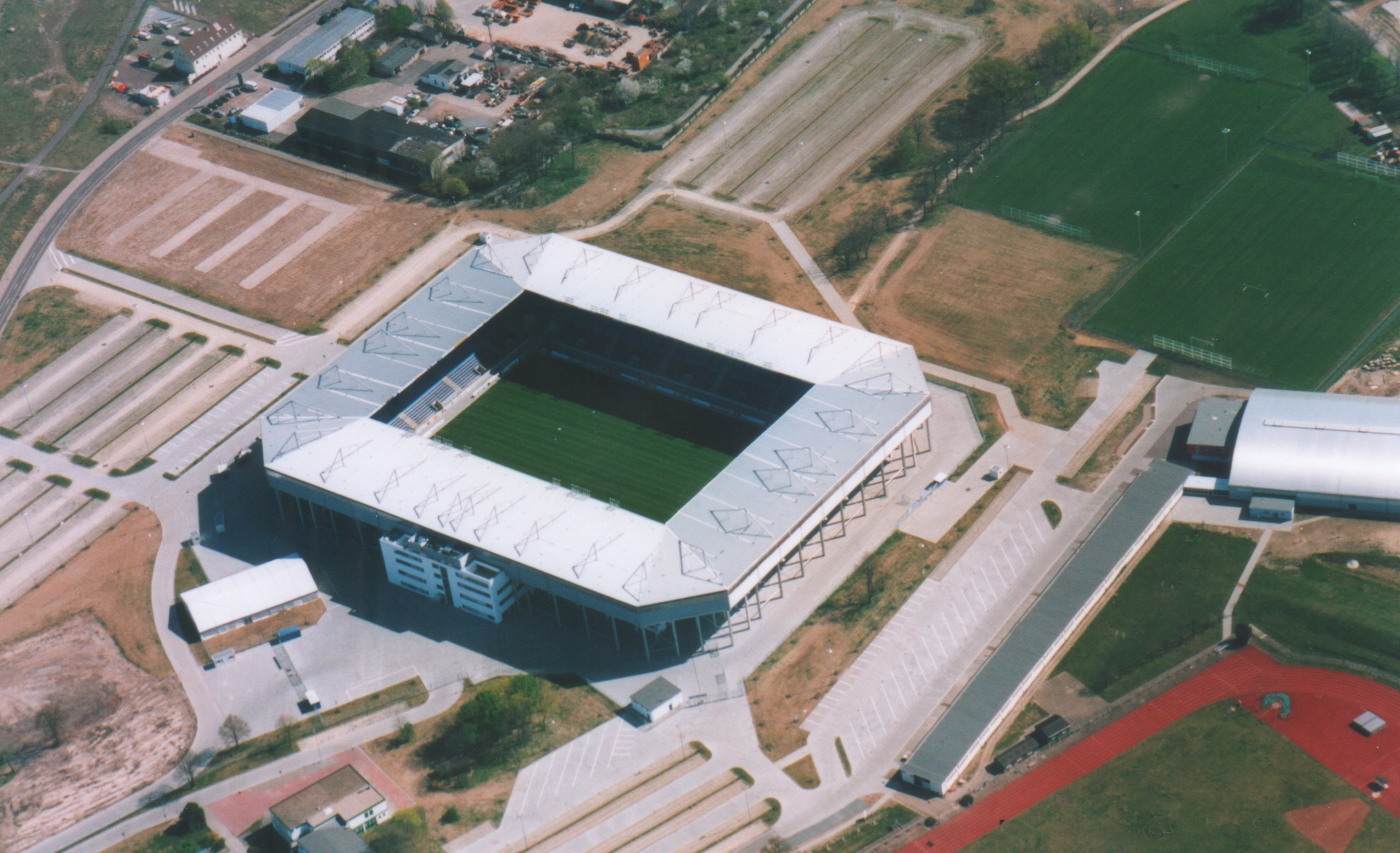
Aerial view

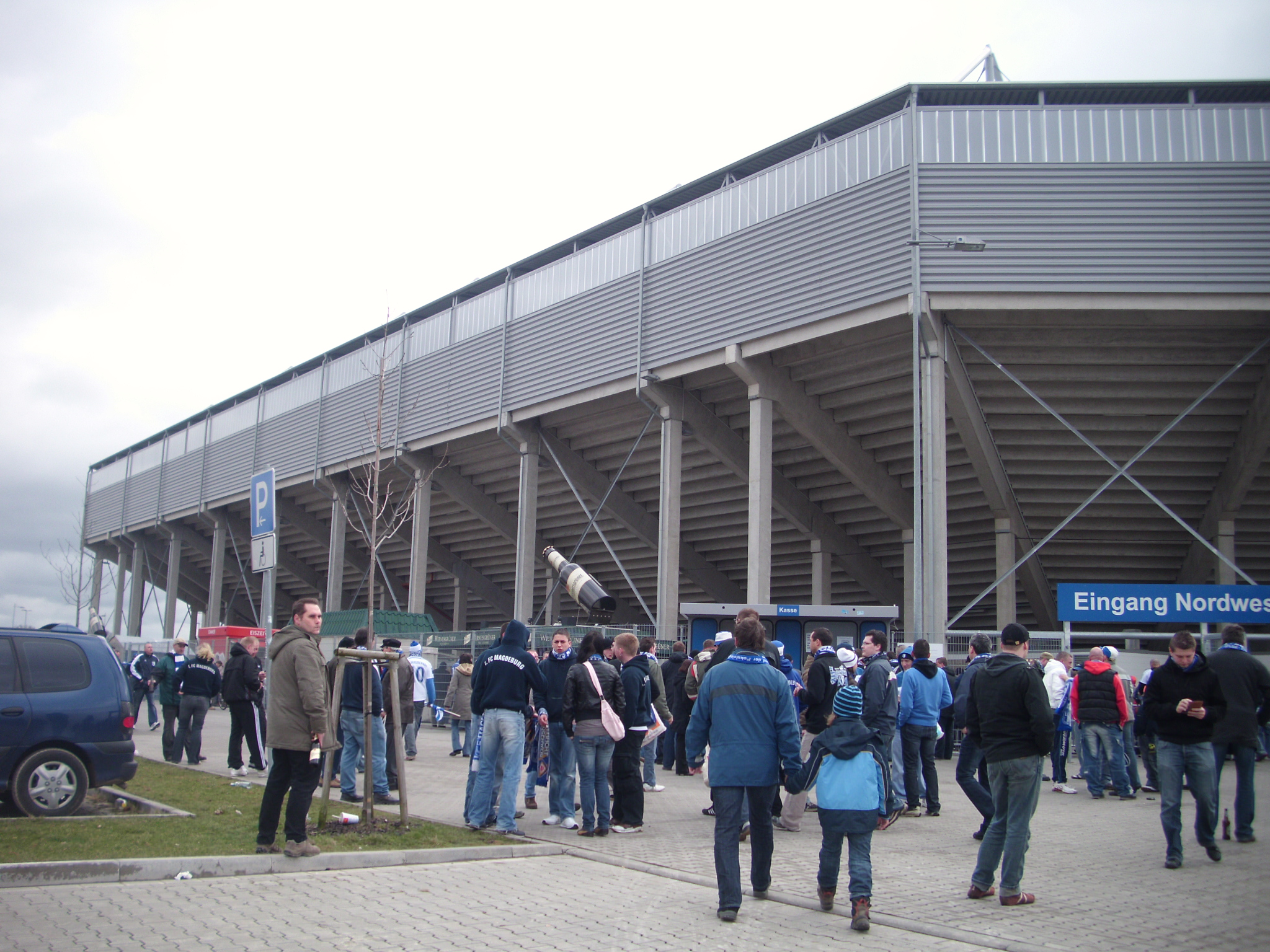
Outside of the north stand

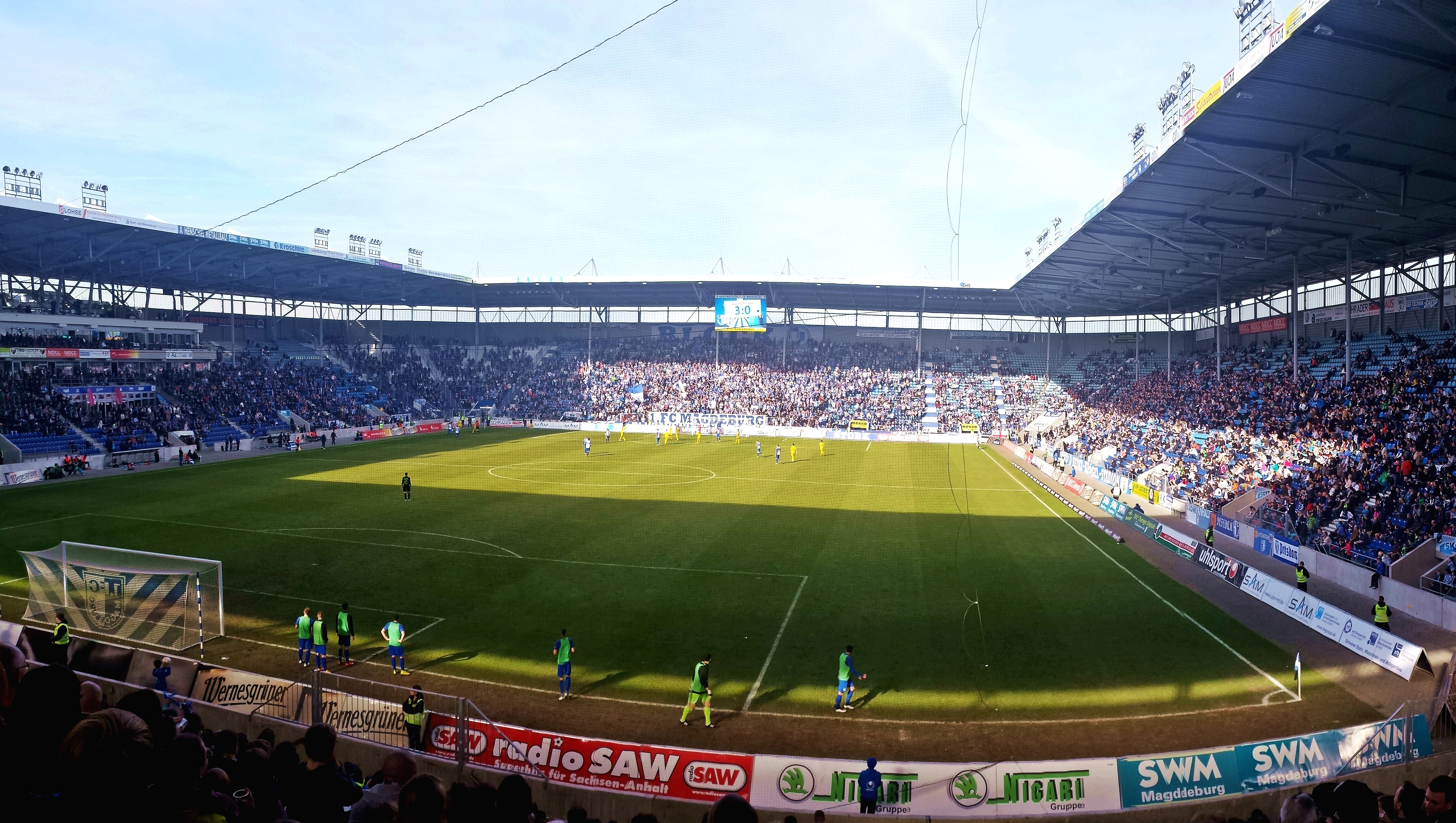
Panorama during a football match

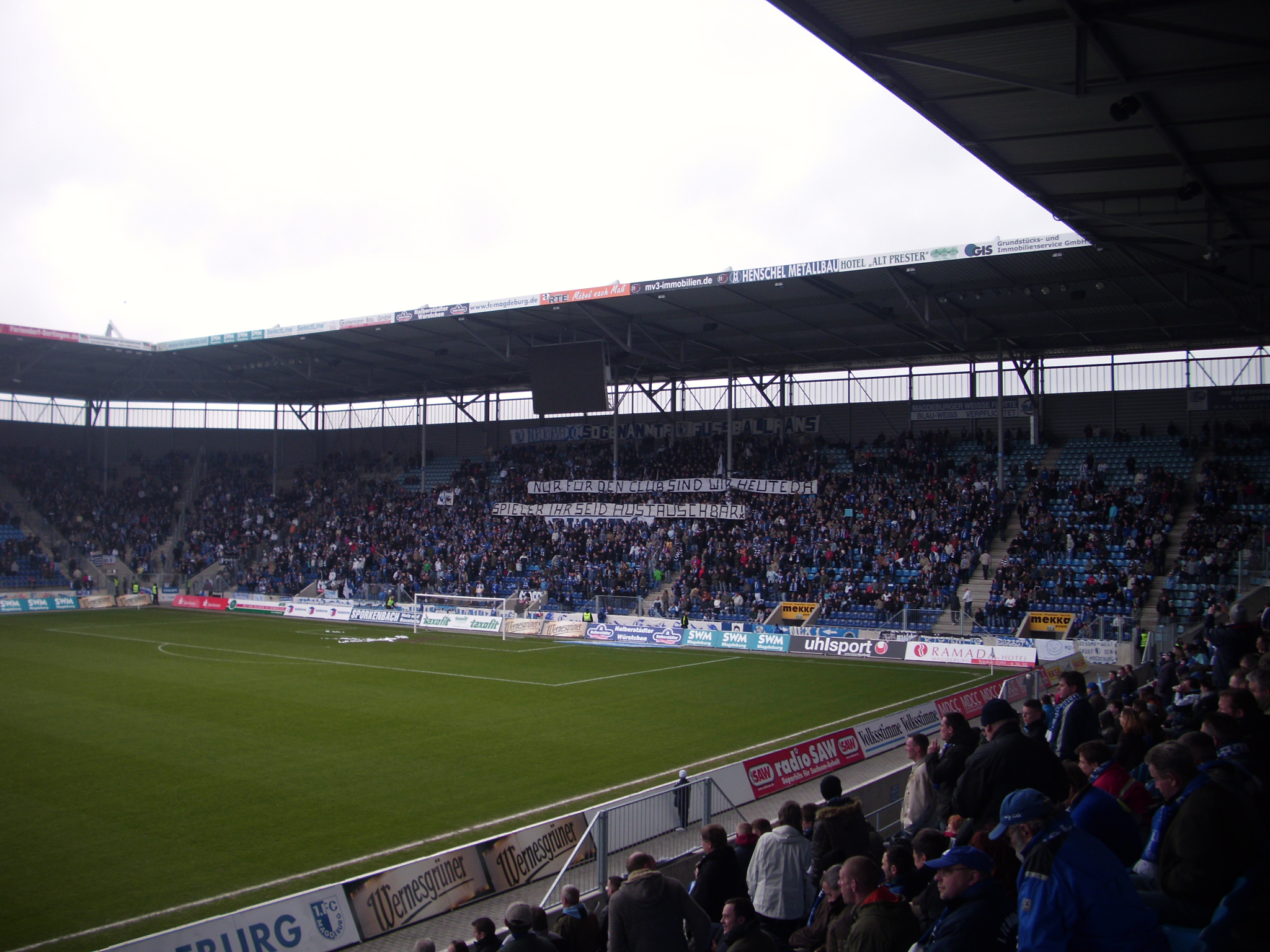
View towards the north stand

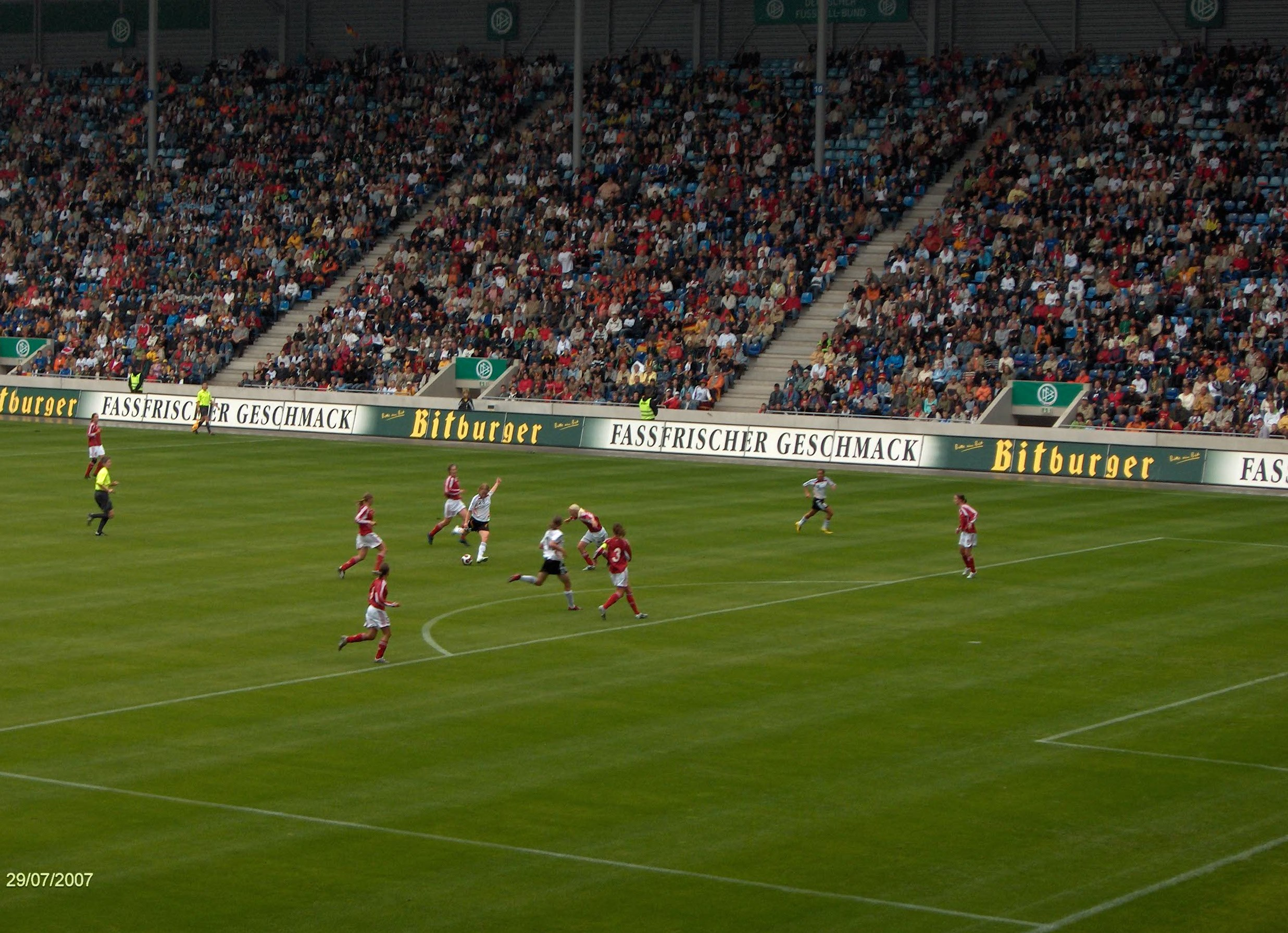
Women's friendly
Germany - Denmark

== See also ==
- List of football stadiums in Germany
- Lists of stadiums
