= Alexander Nollenberger =

German footballer (born 1997)

Personal information
- Date of birth: 4 June 1997 (age 29)
- Place of birth: Memmingen, Germany
- Height: 1.80 m (5 ft 11 in)
- Position: Winger

Team information
- Current team: 1. FC Magdeburg
- Number: 17

Youth career
- –2014: TSG Thannhausen
- 2014–2016: FV Illertissen

Senior career*
Years	Team	Apps	(Gls)
2016	FV Illertissen II	16	(13)
2016–2018	FV Illertissen	41	(15)
2018–2020	Bayern Munich II	31	(4)
2020–2023	SpVgg Bayreuth	80	(25)
2023–	1. FC Magdeburg	82	(5)
- * Club domestic league appearances and goals as of 18 May 2026

Alexander Nollenberger (born 4 June 1997) is a German professional footballer who plays as a winger for 1. FC Magdeburg.

== Career ==
Nollenberger made his 3. Liga debut for Bayern Munich II on 30 July 2019, coming on as a substitute in the 79th minute for Joshua Zirkzee in the away match against Hansa Rostock, which finished as a 2–1 loss.

In 2020, Nollenberger joined SpVgg Bayreuth.

== Career statistics ==
As of 30 July 2019

Appearances and goals by club, season and competition
Club	Season	League			Cup		Other		Total	
Club	Season	Division	Apps	Goals	Apps	Goals	Apps	Goals	Apps	Goals
FV Illertissen II	2015–16	Landesliga Bayern-Südwest	1	0	—		—		1	0
FV Illertissen II	2016–17	Landesliga Bayern-Südwest	15	13	—		—		15	13
FV Illertissen II	Total		16	13	—		—		16	13
FV Illertissen	2016–17	Regionalliga Bayern	19	4	0	0	—		19	4
FV Illertissen	2017–18	Regionalliga Bayern	22	11	1 (Note: Appearance in Bavarian Cup)	0	—		23	11
FV Illertissen	Total		41	15	1	0	—		41	15
Bayern Munich II	2017–18	Regionalliga Bayern	8	0	—		—		8	0
Bayern Munich II	2018–19	Regionalliga Bayern	22	4	—		1 (Note: Appearance in 3. Liga promotion play-offs)	0	23	4
Bayern Munich II	2019–20	3. Liga	1	0	—		—		1	0
Bayern Munich II	Total		31	4	—		1	0	32	4
Career total			88	32	1	0	1	0	90	32

== Honours ==
SpVgg Bayreuth

- Regionalliga Bayern: 2021–22
