= Pierre Nadjombe =

Togolese footballer (born 2003)

Personal information
- Date of birth: 10 May 2003 (age 23)
- Place of birth: Cologne, Germany
- Height: 1.83 m (6 ft 0 in)
- Position: Right-back

Team information
- Current team: 1. FC Magdeburg
- Number: 28

Youth career
- Viktoria Köln
- 2016–2024: 1. FC Köln

Senior career*
Years	Team	Apps	(Gls)
2022–2024	1. FC Köln II	48	(3)
2024–2025	1. FC Magdeburg II	20	(2)
2024–	1. FC Magdeburg	6	(0)
2025–2026	→ Alemannia Aachen (loan)	27	(2)

International career^{‡}
2023	Togo U23	2	(0)
2026–	Togo	2	(0)
- * Club domestic league appearances and goals as of 28 May 2026 ‡ National team caps and goals as of 13:52, 15 April 2026 (UTC)

Pierre Nadjombe (born 10 May 2003) is a professional footballer who plays as a right-back for 2. Bundesliga club 1. FC Magdeburg. Born in Germany, he represents Togo national team.

== Club career ==
Nadjombe is a product of the youth academies of the German clubs Viktoria Köln and 1. FC Köln. On 29 March 2022, he signed a 2-year contract with Köln and was promoted to their reserves in the Regionalliga. On 4 January 2024, he signed a pre-contract with Magdeburg starting 31 July 2024. On 22 August 2025, Nadjombe joined the club Alemannia Aachen on a year-long loan in the 3. Liga. Following his loan spell, he returned to Magdeburg and extended his contract with the club in June 2026.

== International career ==
Born in Germany, Akakpo is of Nadjombe descent. He was called up to the Togo national team for a set of friendlies in March 2026.

== Personal life ==
Pierre is the younger brother of Jean-Marie Nadjombe, also a professional footballer.
