= 2016 UEFA European Under-19 Championship squads =

Player listings in youth football competition

The 2016 UEFA European Under-19 Championship was an international football tournament held in Germany from 11 to 24 July 2016.

Each national team submitted a squad of 18 players, two of whom had to be goalkeepers.

Players in boldface have since been capped at full international level.

Ages are as of the start of the tournament, 11 July 2016.

== Group A ==
=== Germany ===
On 15 June 2016, Germany announced a 23-man preliminary list. On 7 July 2016, Germany announced the final squad.

Head coach: Guido Streichsbier

No.	Pos.	Player	Date of birth (age)	Caps	Goals	Club
1	GK	Dominik Reimann	18 June 1997 (aged 19)	3	0	(German Football Association) Borussia Dortmund
2	DF	Phil Neumann	8 July 1997 (aged 19)	4	1	(German Football Association) Schalke 04
3	DF	**Maximilian Mittelstädt**	18 March 1997 (aged 19)	5	0	(German Football Association) Hertha BSC
4	DF	Lukas Boeder	18 April 1997 (aged 19)	7	0	(German Football Association) Bayer Leverkusen
5	DF	Benedikt Gimber	19 February 1997 (aged 19)	9	0	(German Football Association) TSG Hoffenheim
6	DF	Gino Fechner	5 September 1997 (aged 18)	7	0	(German Football Association) RB Leipzig
7	MF	**Suat Serdar**	11 April 1997 (aged 19)	7	2	(German Football Association) Mainz 05
8	MF	**Benjamin Henrichs**	23 February 1997 (aged 19)	8	1	(German Football Association) Bayer Leverkusen
9	FW	Cedric Teuchert	14 January 1997 (aged 19)	2	1	(German Football Association) 1. FC Nürnberg
10	MF	Max Besuschkow	31 May 1997 (aged 19)	7	3	(German Football Association) VfB Stuttgart
11	FW	Philipp Ochs	17 April 1997 (aged 19)	7	2	(German Football Association) TSG Hoffenheim
12	GK	Florian Müller	13 November 1997 (aged 18)	3	0	(German Football Association) Mainz 05
13	MF	Fabian Reese	29 November 1997 (aged 18)	2	0	(German Football Association) Schalke 04
14	MF	Gökhan Gül	17 July 1998 (aged 17)	0	0	(German Football Association) VfL Bochum
15	DF	Jannes Horn	6 February 1997 (aged 19)	9	0	(German Football Association) VfL Wolfsburg
16	FW	Janni Serra	13 March 1998 (aged 18)	0	0	(German Football Association) Borussia Dortmund
17	MF	Marvin Mehlem	9 November 1997 (aged 18)	5	2	(German Football Association) Karlsruher SC
18	MF	Amara Condé	6 January 1997 (aged 19)	8	1	(German Football Association) VfL Wolfsburg

=== Italy ===
On 7 July 2016, Italy announced the final squad.

Head coach: Paolo Vanoli

No.	Pos.	Player	Date of birth (age)	Caps	Goals	Club
1	GK	**Alex Meret**	22 March 1997 (aged 19)			(Italian Football Federation) Udinese
2	DF	Davide Vitturini	21 February 1997 (aged 19)			(Italian Football Federation) Pescara
3	DF	**Federico Dimarco**	10 November 1997 (aged 18)			(Italian Football Federation) Empoli
4	MF	**Nicolò Barella**	7 February 1997 (aged 19)			(Italian Football Federation) Cagliari
5	DF	Filippo Romagna	26 May 1997 (aged 19)			(Italian Football Federation) Juventus
6	MF	**Manuel Locatelli**	8 January 1998 (aged 18)			(Italian Football Federation) Milan
7	MF	Simone Edera	9 January 1997 (aged 19)			(Italian Football Federation) Torino
8	MF	Alberto Picchi	12 August 1997 (aged 18)			(Italian Football Federation) Empoli
9	FW	Andrea Favilli	17 May 1997 (aged 19)			(Italian Football Federation) Livorno
10	FW	Simone Minelli	8 January 1997 (aged 19)			(Italian Football Federation) Fiorentina
11	MF	Francesco Cassata	15 July 1997 (aged 18)			(Italian Football Federation) Juventus
13	DF	Giuseppe Pezzella	29 November 1997 (aged 18)			(Italian Football Federation) Palermo
14	MF	Simone Pontisso	20 March 1997 (aged 19)			(Italian Football Federation) Udinese
15	DF	Mauro Coppolaro	10 March 1997 (aged 19)			(Italian Football Federation) Udinese
16	FW	**Patrick Cutrone**	3 January 1998 (aged 18)			(Italian Football Federation) Milan
17	FW	Giuseppe Panico	10 May 1997 (aged 19)			(Italian Football Federation) Genoa
18	MF	Paolo Ghiglione	2 February 1997 (aged 19)			(Italian Football Federation) Genoa
22	GK	Andrea Zaccagno	27 May 1997 (aged 19)			(Italian Football Federation) Torino

=== Austria ===
Head coach: Rupert Marko

No.	Pos.	Player	Date of birth (age)	Caps	Goals	Club
1	GK	Paul Gartler	10 March 1997 (aged 19)			(Austrian Football Association) Rapid Wien
2	MF	**Xaver Schlager**	28 September 1997 (aged 18)			(Austrian Football Association) Red Bull Salzburg
3	DF	Stefan Perić	13 February 1997 (aged 19)			(German Football Association) VfB Stuttgart II
4	MF	Marco Krainz	17 May 1997 (aged 19)			(Austrian Football Association) Austria Lustenau
5	MF	Benjamin Kaufmann	14 June 1997 (aged 19)			Unattached
6	DF	**Stefan Posch**	14 May 1997 (aged 19)			(German Football Association) Hoffenheim 1899 II
7	MF	**Sandi Lovrić** (Note: Capped for Slovenia)	28 March 1998 (aged 18)			(Austrian Football Association) Sturm Graz
8	MF	Albin Gashi	25 January 1997 (aged 19)			(Austrian Football Association) Rapid Wien
9	FW	Arnel Jakupovic	29 May 1998 (aged 18)			(The Football Association) Middlesbrough
10	MF	Philipp Malicsek	3 June 1997 (aged 19)			(Austrian Football Association) Rapid Wien
11	MF	Simon Pirkl	3 April 1997 (aged 19)			(Austrian Football Association) Wacker Innsbruck
14	DF	**Maximilian Wöber**	4 February 1998 (aged 18)			(Austrian Football Association) Rapid Wien
15	DF	Manuel Maranda	9 July 1997 (aged 19)			(Austrian Football Association) Admira Wacker
16	MF	Wilhelm Vorsager	26 June 1997 (aged 19)			(Austrian Football Association) Admira Wacker
17	FW	Fabian Gmeiner	17 January 1997 (aged 19)			Unattached
19	FW	Patrick Hasenhüttl	20 May 1997 (aged 19)			(German Football Association) FC Ingolstadt II
20	DF	Sandro Ingolitsch	18 April 1997 (aged 19)			(Austrian Football Association) FC Liefering
21	GK	Tobias Schützenauer	19 May 1997 (aged 19)			(Austrian Football Association) Sturm Graz

=== Portugal ===
On 16 June 2016, Portugal announced 23-man preliminary list. On 7 July, Peixe announced the final squad.

Head coach: Emílio Peixe

No.	Pos.	Player	Date of birth (age)	Caps	Goals	Club
1	GK	Pedro Silva	13 February 1997 (aged 19)	8	0	(Portuguese Football Federation) Sporting CP
2	DF	Pedro Empis	1 February 1997 (aged 19)	11	0	(Portuguese Football Federation) Sporting CP
3	DF	**Rúben Dias**	14 May 1997 (aged 19)	18	2	(Portuguese Football Federation) Benfica
4	DF	Ferro	26 March 1997 (aged 19)	9	1	(Portuguese Football Federation) Benfica
5	DF	Yuri Ribeiro	24 January 1997 (aged 19)	9	0	(Portuguese Football Federation) Benfica
6	MF	Pedro Rodrigues	20 May 1997 (aged 19)	19	3	(Portuguese Football Federation) Benfica
7	FW	Diogo Gonçalves	6 February 1997 (aged 19)	9	0	(Portuguese Football Federation) Benfica
8	MF	Gonçalo Rodrigues	18 July 1997 (aged 18)	12	3	(Portuguese Football Federation) Benfica
9	FW	Xande Silva	16 March 1997 (aged 19)	17	4	(Portuguese Football Federation) Vitória de Guimarães
10	MF	João Carvalho	9 March 1997 (aged 19)	7	1	(Portuguese Football Federation) Benfica
11	FW	Aurélio Buta	10 February 1997 (aged 19)	12	4	(Portuguese Football Federation) Benfica
12	GK	**Diogo Costa**	19 September 1999 (aged 16)	0	0	(Portuguese Football Federation) Porto
13	DF	Pedro Pacheco	27 January 1997 (aged 19)	0	0	(Swiss Football Association) Basel
14	FW	Pedro Delgado	7 April 1997 (aged 19)	8	3	(Italian Football Federation) Inter Milan
15	DF	**Diogo Dalot**	18 March 1999 (aged 17)	0	0	(Portuguese Football Federation) Porto
16	MF	Xadas	2 December 1997 (aged 18)	6	1	(Portuguese Football Federation) Braga
17	FW	Asumah Abubakar	10 May 1997 (aged 19)	0	0	(Royal Dutch Football Association) Willem II
18	FW	Ricardo Almeida	9 May 1997 (aged 19)	5	2	(Portuguese Football Federation) Moreirense

== Group B ==
=== Croatia ===
On 27 June 2016, Croatia announced a 25-man preliminary list.

Head coach: Ferdo Milin

No.	Pos.	Player	Date of birth (age)	Caps	Goals	Club
1	GK	Karlo Letica	11 February 1997 (aged 19)			(Croatian Football Federation) Hajduk Split
2	DF	Matej Hudećek	27 December 1998 (aged 17)			(Croatian Football Federation) Dinamo Zagreb
3	DF	Silvio Anočić	10 September 1997 (aged 18)			(Italian Football Federation) Roma
4	DF	**Martin Erlić**	24 January 1998 (aged 18)			(Italian Football Federation) Sassuolo
5	DF	Vinko Soldo	15 February 1998 (aged 18)			(Croatian Football Federation) Dinamo Zagreb
6	MF	Karlo Plantak	11 November 1997 (aged 18)			(Croatian Football Federation) Dinamo Zagreb
7	MF	**Josip Brekalo**	23 June 1998 (aged 18)			(German Football Association) VfL Wolfsburg
8	MF	Bojan Knežević	28 January 1997 (aged 19)			(Croatian Football Federation) Dinamo Zagreb
9	FW	Fran Brodić	8 January 1997 (aged 19)			(Royal Belgian Football Association) Club Brugge
10	MF	Andrija Balić	11 August 1997 (aged 18)			(Italian Football Federation) Udinese
11	MF	Davor Lovren	3 October 1998 (aged 17)			(Croatian Football Federation) Dinamo Zagreb
12	GK	Ivan Nevistić	31 July 1998 (aged 17)			(Croatian Football Federation) Rijeka
13	FW	Ivan Božić	8 June 1997 (aged 19)			(Croatian Football Federation) Dinamo Zagreb
14	MF	**Luka Ivanušec**	26 November 1998 (aged 17)			(Croatian Football Federation) Lokomotiva
15	MF	Marijan Čabraja	25 February 1997 (aged 19)			(Croatian Football Federation) Dinamo Zagreb
16	MF	**Nikola Moro**	12 March 1998 (aged 18)			(Croatian Football Federation) Dinamo Zagreb
17	MF	Matija Fintić	2 December 1997 (aged 18)			(Croatian Football Federation) Dinamo Zagreb
18	MF	**Kristijan Jakić**	14 May 1997 (aged 19)			(Croatian Football Federation) RNK Split

=== Netherlands ===
On 28 June 2016, Netherlands announced a 24-man preliminary list.

Head coach: Aron Winter

No.	Pos.	Player	Date of birth (age)	Caps	Goals	Club
1	GK	Yanick van Osch	24 March 1997 (aged 19)	12	0	(Royal Dutch Football Association) PSV Eindhoven
2	DF	Deyovaisio Zeefuik	11 March 1998 (aged 18)	0	0	(Royal Dutch Football Association) Ajax
3	MF	**Pablo Rosario** (Note: Capped for Dominican Republic)	7 January 1997 (aged 19)	3	0	(Royal Dutch Football Association) Almere City
4	DF	Hidde ter Avest	20 May 1997 (aged 19)	9	0	(Royal Dutch Football Association) Twente
5	DF	**Calvin Verdonk** (Note: Capped for Indonesia)	26 April 1997 (aged 19)	13	0	(Royal Dutch Football Association) PEC Zwolle
6	MF	**Laros Duarte** (Note: Capped for Cape Verde)	28 February 1997 (aged 19)	10	0	(Royal Dutch Football Association) PSV Eindhoven
7	FW	**Steven Bergwijn**	8 October 1997 (aged 18)	16	6	(Royal Dutch Football Association) PSV Eindhoven
8	MF	Abdelhak Nouri	2 April 1997 (aged 19)	19	7	(Royal Dutch Football Association) Ajax
9	FW	Sam Lammers	30 April 1997 (aged 19)	10	7	(Royal Dutch Football Association) PSV Eindhoven
10	MF	Jari Schuurman	22 February 1997 (aged 19)	17	4	(Royal Dutch Football Association) Feyenoord
11	MF	**Kenneth Paal** (Note: Capped for Suriname)	24 June 1997 (aged 19)	7	0	(Royal Dutch Football Association) PSV Eindhoven
12	DF	Julian Lelieveld	24 November 1997 (aged 18)	10	0	(Royal Dutch Football Association) Vitesse
13	DF	**Jurich Carolina** (Note: Capped for Curaçao)	15 July 1998 (aged 17)	5	0	(Royal Dutch Football Association) PSV Eindhoven
14	MF	Carel Eiting	11 February 1998 (aged 18)	2	1	(Royal Dutch Football Association) Ajax
15	FW	Vince Gino Dekker	22 March 1997 (aged 19)	9	2	(Royal Dutch Football Association) Ajax
16	GK	**Maarten Paes**	14 May 1998 (aged 18)	0	0	(Royal Dutch Football Association) NEC
17	FW	Dennis van der Heijden	17 February 1997 (aged 19)	0	0	(Royal Dutch Football Association) ADO Den Haag
18	MF	Michel Vlap	2 June 1997 (aged 19)	3	0	(Royal Dutch Football Association) Heerenveen

=== France ===
On 6 July 2016, France announced their final squad.

Head coach: Ludovic Batelli

No.	Pos.	Player	Date of birth (age)	Caps	Goals	Club
1	GK	Paul Bernardoni	18 April 1997 (aged 19)	9	0	(French Football Federation) Bordeaux
2	DF	Enock Kwateng	9 April 1997 (aged 19)	14	0	(French Football Federation) Nantes
3	DF	Olivier Boscagli	18 November 1997 (aged 18)	14	1	(French Football Federation) Nice
4	DF	**Jérôme Onguéné** (Note: Capped for Cameroon)	22 December 1997 (aged 18)	12	2	(French Football Federation) Sochaux
5	DF	**Issa Diop** (Note: Capped for Morocco)	9 January 1997 (aged 19)	15	2	(French Football Federation) Toulouse
6	DF	Jérémy Gelin	24 April 1997 (aged 19)	9	1	(French Football Federation) Rennes
7	FW	Jean-Kévin Augustin	16 June 1997 (aged 19)	8	6	(French Football Federation) Paris Saint-Germain
8	MF	Lucas Tousart	29 April 1997 (aged 19)	16	0	(French Football Federation) Lyon
9	FW	Florian Ayé	19 January 1997 (aged 19)	13	3	(French Football Federation) Auxerre
10	FW	**Marcus Thuram**	6 August 1997 (aged 18)	10	3	(French Football Federation) Sochaux
11	FW	**Kylian Mbappé**	20 December 1998 (aged 17)	3	2	(French Football Federation) Monaco
12	MF	Ludovic Blas	31 December 1997 (aged 18)	6	4	(French Football Federation) Guingamp
13	DF	Clément Michelin	11 May 1997 (aged 19)	6	0	(French Football Federation) Toulouse
14	MF	**Amine Harit**	18 June 1997 (aged 19)	7	0	(French Football Federation) Nantes
15	DF	Faitout Maouassa	6 July 1998 (aged 18)	0	0	(French Football Federation) Nancy
16	GK	Quentin Braat	6 July 1997 (aged 19)	7	0	(French Football Federation) Nantes
17	MF	Denis-Will Poha	28 May 1997 (aged 19)	14	0	(French Football Federation) Rennes
18	MF	**Jeando Fuchs**	11 October 1997 (aged 18)	4	0	(French Football Federation) Sochaux

=== England ===
On 6 July 2016, England announced their final squad.

Head coach: Aidy Boothroyd

No.	Pos.	Player	Date of birth (age)	Caps	Goals	Club
1	GK	Freddie Woodman	4 March 1997 (aged 19)			(The Football Association) Newcastle United
2	DF	Jonjoe Kenny	15 March 1997 (aged 19)			(The Football Association) Everton
3	DF	Callum Connolly	23 September 1997 (aged 18)			(The Football Association) Everton
4	MF	Jordan Rossiter	24 March 1997 (aged 19)			(Scottish Football Association) Rangers
5	DF	Taylor Moore	12 May 1997 (aged 19)			(French Football Federation) Lens
6	DF	Dael Fry	30 August 1997 (aged 18)			(The Football Association) Middlesbrough
7	FW	**Tammy Abraham**	2 October 1997 (aged 18)			(The Football Association) Chelsea
8	MF	Joshua Onomah	27 April 1997 (aged 19)			(The Football Association) Tottenham Hotspur
9	FW	**Dominic Solanke**	14 September 1997 (aged 18)			(The Football Association) Chelsea
10	FW	Sheyi Ojo	19 June 1997 (aged 19)			(The Football Association) Liverpool
11	FW	Isaiah Brown	7 January 1997 (aged 19)			(The Football Association) Chelsea
12	DF	**Kyle Walker-Peters**	13 April 1997 (aged 19)			(The Football Association) Tottenham Hotspur
13	GK	Sam Howes	10 November 1997 (aged 18)			(The Football Association) West Ham United
14	MF	Ryan Ledson	19 August 1997 (aged 18)			(The Football Association) Everton
15	DF	**Fikayo Tomori**	19 December 1997 (aged 18)			(The Football Association) Chelsea
16	MF	Reece Oxford	16 December 1998 (aged 17)			(The Football Association) West Ham United
17	FW	**Ademola Lookman** (Note: Capped for Nigeria)	20 October 1997 (aged 18)			(The Football Association) Charlton Athletic
18	MF	**Ainsley Maitland-Niles**	29 August 1997 (aged 18)			(The Football Association) Arsenal
19	DF	Tafari Moore^{1}	5 July 1997 (aged 19)			(The Football Association) Arsenal

1. Tafari Moore was called up during the tournament due to an injury to Callum Connolly.
