= 2014–15 ACF Fiorentina season =

Fiorentina
2014–15 season
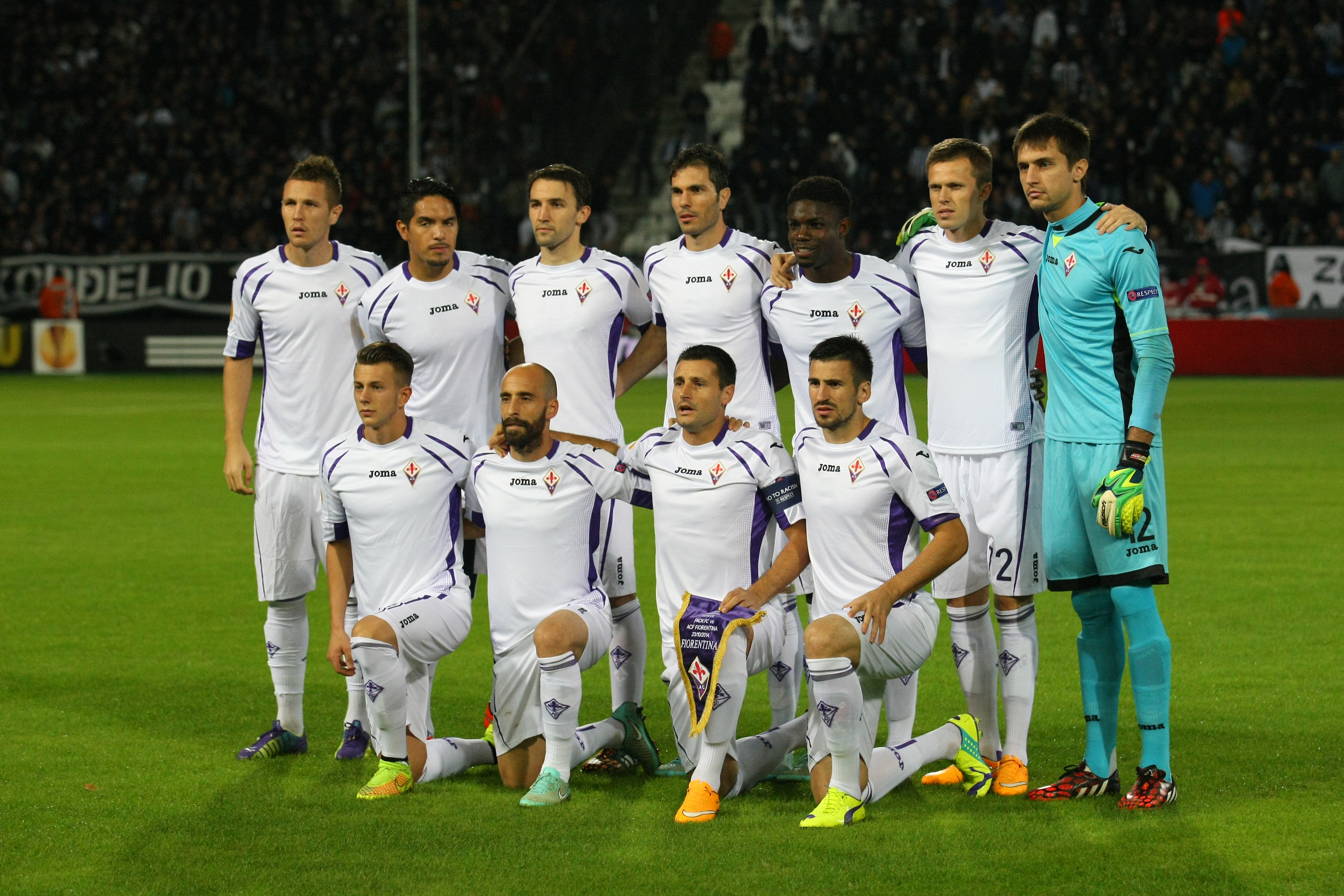
- President: Mario Cognigni
- Manager: Vincenzo Montella
- Stadium: Stadio Artemio Franchi
- Serie A: 4th
- Coppa Italia: Semi-finals
- UEFA Europa League: Semi-finals
- Top goalscorer: League: Josip Iličić (8); All: Josip Iličić, Mario Gómez (10)
- Highest home attendance: 38,160 vs Juventus (5 December 2014, Serie A)
- Lowest home attendance: 7,562 vs Dinamo Minsk (11 December 2014, Europa League)
- Average home league attendance: 30,309
Home colours	Away colours	Third colours

The 2014–15 season was the 88th season in ACF Fiorentina's history and their 77th season in Serie A. The club competed in Serie A, finishing fourth, and reached the semi-finals in both the Coppa Italia and UEFA Europa League; in the latter competition they were eliminated 5–0 on aggregate by eventual champions Sevilla.

The season was coach Vincenzo Montella's third and final season with the club – as well as third consecutive fourth-placed finish – as he would be sacked and replaced by former Juventus player Paulo Sousa in the 2015–16 pre-season. Slovenian player Josip Iličić finished as top scorer in the league with eight goals, while Iličić and German international and former Bayern Munich player Mario Gómez together finished as top scorers in all competitions, with ten goals each.

== Season review ==
The 2014–15 season saw Fiorentina compete on three fronts as they did the previous season, with one improvement being that they qualified automatically to the group stage of the Europa League (rather than having to traverse a qualifying round) due to the fact that the previous season's Coppa Italia winners Napoli qualified to the Champions League.

== Players ==
=== Squad information ===
Last updated on 31 May 2015
Appearances include league matches only

No.	Name	Nat	Position(s)	Date of birth (Age at end of season)	Signed from	Signed in	Contract ends	Apps.	Goals
Goalkeepers
1	Neto	(Brazil)	GK	July 19, 1989 (aged 25)	(Brazil) Atlético Paranaense	2011	2015	101	0
12	Ciprian Tătărușanu	(Romania)	GK	February 9, 1986 (aged 29)	(Romania) Steaua București	2014	2019	18	0
21	Cristiano Lupatelli	(Italy)	GK	June 21, 1978 (aged 37)	(Italy) Genoa	2012	2015	42	0
24	Luca Lezzerini	(Italy)	GK	March 24, 1995 (aged 20)	(Italy) Youth Sector	2011	2016	0	0
31	Antonio Rosati	(Italy)	GK	June 26, 1983 (aged 32)	(Italy) Napoli	2015	2016	4	0
Defenders
2	Gonzalo Rodríguez	(Argentina)	CB	April 10, 1984 (aged 31)	(Spain) Villarreal	2012	2017	98	17
4	Micah Richards	(England)	CB / RB	June 24, 1988 (aged 27)	(England) Manchester City	2014	2015	10	0
15	Stefan Savić	(Montenegro)	CB	January 8, 1991 (aged 24)	(England) Manchester City	2012	2019	86	4
19	José María Basanta	(Argentina)	CB / LB	April 3, 1984 (aged 31)	(Mexico) Monterrey	2014	2016	24	2
23	Manuel Pasqual (C)	(Italy)	LB / LM	March 13, 1982 (aged 33)	(Italy) Arezzo	2005	2016	285	7
28	Marcos Alonso	(Spain)	LB / LM	December 28, 1990 (aged 24)	(England) Bolton Wanderers	2013	2016	25	1
35	Ricardo Bagadur	(Croatia)	CB	September 16, 1995 (aged 19)	(Croatia) Rijeka	2014	2016	1	0
40	Nenad Tomović	(Serbia)	CB / RB	August 30, 1987 (aged 27)	(Italy) Genoa	2012	2016	75	1
Midfielders
5	Milan Badelj	(Croatia)	DM / CM	February 25, 1989 (aged 26)	(Germany) Hamburg	2014	2018	21	1
6	Juan Manuel Vargas	(Peru)	LB / LM / LW	October 5, 1983 (aged 31)	(Italy) Catania	2008	2015	147	17
7	David Pizarro	(Chile)	DM / CM	September 11, 1979 (aged 35)	(Italy) Roma	2012	2015	83	4
10	Alberto Aquilani	(Italy)	DM / CM / AM	July 7, 1984 (aged 30)	(England) Liverpool	2012	2015	81	13
14	Matías Fernández	(Chile)	CM / AM / RM	May 15, 1986 (aged 29)	(Portugal) Sporting CP	2012	2016	74	6
16	Jasmin Kurtić	(Slovenia)	CM	January 10, 1989 (aged 26)	(Italy) Sassuolo	2014	2015	21	1
17	Joaquín	(Spain)	RM / RW / SS	July 21, 1981 (aged 33)	(Spain) Málaga	2013	2016	50	4
18	Alessandro Diamanti	(Italy)	AM / RW / SS	May 2, 1983 (aged 32)	(China) Guangzhou Evergrande	2015	2015	11	2
20	Borja Valero	(Spain)	DM / CM / AM	January 12, 1985 (aged 30)	(Spain) Villarreal	2012	2019	97	9
32	Andrea Lazzari	(Italy)	CM / AM	December 3, 1984 (aged 30)	(Italy) Cagliari	2011	2015	36	2
38	Aleandro Rosi	(Italy)	RB / RM	May 17, 1987 (aged 28)	(Italy) Genoa	2015	2015	4	0
72	Josip Iličić	(Slovenia)	AM / RW / SS	January 29, 1988 (aged 27)	(Italy) Palermo	2013	2018	46	11
93	Octávio	(Brazil)	CM / AM	December 29, 1993 (aged 21)	(Brazil) Botafogo	2014	2015	0	0
Forwards
9	Alberto Gilardino	(Italy)	CF / ST	July 8, 1982 (aged 32)	(China) Guangzhou Evergrande	2015	2015	14	4
22	Giuseppe Rossi	(Italy)	SS / CF	February 1, 1987 (aged 28)	(Spain) Villarreal	2013	2017	22	16
29	Federico Bernardeschi	(Italy)	RW / LW / SS	February 16, 1994 (aged 21)	(Italy) Youth Sector	2011	2016	7	1
30	Khouma Babacar	(Senegal)	CF / ST	March 17, 1993 (aged 22)	(Italy) Youth Sector	2009	2016	43	8
33	Mario Gómez	(Germany)	CF / ST	July 10, 1985 (aged 29)	(Germany) Bayern Munich	2013	2017	29	7
43	Simone Minelli	(Italy)	LW / RW / SS	January 8, 1997 (aged 18)	(Italy) Youth Sector	2015		0	0
74	Mohamed Salah	(Egypt)	AM / RW / SS	June 15, 1992 (aged 23)	(England) Chelsea	2015	2015	16	6
77	Mounir El Hamdaoui	(Morocco)	CF / ST	July 14, 1984 (aged 30)	(Netherlands) Ajax	2012	2015	22	4
Players transferred during the season
8	Marko Marin	(Germany)	LW / RW / AM	July 7, 1984 (aged 30)	(England) Chelsea	2014	2015	0	0
11	Juan Cuadrado	(Colombia)	RW / AM	May 26, 1988 (aged 27)	(Italy) Udinese	2012	2017	85	20
13	Oleksandr Yakovenko	(Ukraine)	LW / RW / ST	July 23, 1987 (aged 27)	(Belgium) Anderlecht	2013	2016	3	0
25	Joshua Brillante	(Australia)	CM	March 25, 1993 (aged 22)	(Belgium) Anderlecht	2014	2015	2	0
55	Ahmed Hegazi	(Egypt)	CB	January 25, 1991 (aged 24)	(Egypt) Ismaily	2012	2016	3	0

== Transfers ==
=== In ===
Date	Pos.	Player	Age	Moving from	Fee	Source
9 June 2014	GK	(Romania) Ciprian Tătărușanu	28	(Romania) Steaua București	Free	
7 July 2014	MF	(Brazil) Octávio	20	(Brazil) Botafogo	Loan	
14 July 2014	MF	(Australia) Joshua Brillante	21	(Australia) Newcastle Jets	€1M	
1 August 2014	DF	(Argentina) José María Basanta	30	(Mexico) Monterrey	€2.6M	
18 August 2014	MF	(Germany) Marko Marin	25	(England) Chelsea	Loan	
31 August 2014	MF	(Croatia) Milan Badelj	25	(Germany) Hamburg	€4M	
1 September 2014	MF	(Slovenia) Jasmin Kurtić	25	(Italy) Sassuolo	Loan	
1 September 2014	DF	(England) Micah Richards	26	(England) Manchester City	Loan	
10 January 2015	MF	(Italy) Alessandro Diamanti	31	(China) Guangzhou Evergrande	Loan	
26 January 2015	FW	(Italy) Alberto Gilardino	32	(China) Guangzhou Evergrande	Loan	
2 February 2015	FW	(Egypt) Mohamed Salah	22	(England) Chelsea	Loan	
2 February 2015	MF	(Italy) Aleandro Rosi	27	(Italy) Genoa	Loan	

=== Out ===
Date	Pos.	Player	Age	Moving to	Fee	Source
9 July 2014	DF	(Italy) Mattia Cassani	30	(Italy) Parma	Undisclosed	
16 July 2014	MF	(Italy) Massimo Ambrosini	37	Retired	End of contract	
2 August 2014	DF	(Germany) Marvin Compper	29	(Germany) RB Leipzig	€0.5M	
2 February 2015	MF	(Colombia) Juan Cuadrado	26	(England) Chelsea	€31M	
2 February 2015	FW	(Denmark) Kenneth Zohore	21	(Denmark) OB	Free	

== Pre-season and friendlies ==
19 July 2014 Friendly	Fiorentina (Italy)	6–0	(San Marino) S.P. La Fiorita	Moena, Italy
	Gonzalo 28'; Gómez 42'; Acosty 64'; Lazzari 71', 75'; Joaquín 79'

19 July 2014 Friendly	Fiorentina (Italy)	3–0	(Greece) AEL Kalloni	Moena, Italy
	Iličić 41'; Bernardeschi 52'; Gómez 90'

26 July 2014 Coppa EuroAmericana	Estudiantes (Argentina)	0–1	(Italy) Fiorentina	La Plata, Argentina
12:00			Gómez 28'	Stadium: Estadio Único

30 July 2014 Coppa EuroAmericana	Palmeiras (Brazil)	2–1	(Italy) Fiorentina	São Paulo, Brazile
21:50 (UTC−03:00)	Victor Luis 13'; Leandro 35'	Report	Rossi 73'	Stadium: Pacaembu; Attendance: 20,285; Referee: Raphael Claus (São Paulo)

2 August 2014 Coppa EuroAmericana	Universitario (Peru)	0–1	(Italy) Fiorentina	Lima, Peru
18:00 UTC−05:00		Report	Brillante 33'	Stadium: Estadio Nacional; Referee: Víctor Carrillo (Peru)

8 August 2014 Friendly	Málaga (Spain)	0–2	(Italy) Fiorentina	Málaga, Spain
			Rossi 5'; Gonzalo 21'	Stadium: La Rosaleda

11 August 2014 Friendly	Real Betis (Spain)	1–2	(Italy) Fiorentina	Seville, Spain
	Matilla 51'		Vargas 27'; Babacar 38'	Stadium: Manuel Ruiz de Lopera

16 August 2014 Friendly	Real Madrid (Spain)	1–2	(Italy) Fiorentina	Warsaw, Poland
20:45 CEST (UTC+02:00)	Ronaldo 4'	Report	Gómez 27'; Alonso 69'	Stadium: Stadion Narodowy; Attendance: 47,000; Referee: Daniel Stefański (Poland)

18 August 2014 Friendly	Arezzo (Italy)	0–5	(Italy) Fiorentina	Arezzo, Italy
			Bernardeschi 9', 20', 21'; Lazzari 29'; Joaquín 76'

22 August 2014 Friendly	Lucchese (Italy)	0–2	(Italy) Fiorentina	Lucca, Italy
			Vargas 7'; Wolski 78'	Stadium: Porta Elisa

== Competitions ==
=== Overall ===
Competition	Started round	Current position	Final position	First match	Last match
Serie A	Matchday 1	—	4th	30 August 2014	31 May 2015
Coppa Italia	Round of 16	—	Semi-finals	21 January 2015	7 April 2015
Europa League	Group stage	—	Semi-finals	18 September 2014	14 May 2015

Last updated: 31 May 2015

=== Serie A ===
==== League table ====
Pos	Team	Pld	W	D	L	GF	GA	GD	Pts	Qualification or relegation
2	Roma	38	19	13	6	54	31	+23	70	Qualification for the Champions League group stage
3	Lazio	38	21	6	11	71	38	+33	69	Qualification for the Champions League play-off round
4	Fiorentina	38	18	10	10	61	46	+15	64	Qualification for the Europa League group stage (Note: Since the winners of the 2014–15 Coppa Italia (Juventus) qualified for European competition based on league position, the spot awarded to the cup winners (Europa League group stage) was passed to the fifth-placed team and the spot originally meant for the fifth-placed team (Europa League third qualifying round) was given to the highest placed team that has obtained an UEFA licence and not already qualified for European competition.)
5	Napoli	38	18	9	11	70	54	+16	63	Qualification for the Europa League group stage
6	Genoa (Note: Genoa failed to obtain a UEFA licence from Italian Football Federation. Therefore, they were barred to participate in European competitions. Genoa appealed the decision, but the appeal was denied.)	38	16	11	11	62	47	+15	59	

Source: 2014–15 Serie A, 2014-15 Serie A classification.
Rules for classification: 1) points; 2) head-to-head points; 3) head-to-head goal difference; 4) goal difference; 5) number of goals scored; 6) draw. (Head-to-head record is applied for clubs with the same number of points only once all matches between said clubs have been played.).

==== Results summary ====
Overall								Home						Away					
Pld	W	D	L	GF	GA	GD	Pts	W	D	L	GF	GA	GD	W	D	L	GF	GA	GD
38	18	10	10	61	46	+15	64	9	6	4	30	17	+13	9	4	6	31	29	+2

Last updated: 31 May 2015.
Source: Competitive matches

==== Results by round ====
Round	1	2	3	4	5	6	7	8	9	10	11	12	13	14	15	16	17	18	19	20	21	22	23	24	25	26	27	28	29	30	31	32	33	34	35	36	37	38
Ground	A	H	A	H	A	H	H	A	H	A	H	A	A	H	A	H	A	H	A	H	A	H	A	H	A	A	H	A	H	A	H	H	A	H	A	H	A	H
Result	L	D	W	D	D	W	L	D	W	L	L	W	W	D	W	D	L	W	W	D	D	W	W	D	W	L	W	D	W	L	L	L	L	W	W	W	W	W
Position	20	16	10	9	10	9	11	11	10	10	11	10	8	9	8	8	9	6	6	6	6	4	4	5	5	5	5	6	4	5	6	6	7	5	5	5	5	4

Updated to match(es) played on 31 May 2015. Source: Competitive matches
A = Away; H = Home; W = Win; D = Draw; L = Loss

==== Matches ====
30 August 2014 1	Roma	2–0	Fiorentina	Rome
20:45 CEST (UTC+02:00)	Totti (yellow card) 24'; Nainggolan 28'; Astori (yellow card) 57'; Torosidis (yellow card) 72'; Cole (yellow card) 88'; Gervinho 90+3'	Report	Savić (yellow card) 23'; Gonzalo (yellow card) 24'; Alonso (yellow card) 54'; Aquilani (yellow card) 90+1'	Stadium: Stadio Olimpico; Attendance: 44,353; Referee: Marco Guida

14 September 2014 2	Fiorentina	0–0	Genoa	Florence
15:00 CEST (UTC+02:00)	Tomović (yellow card) 51'	Report	Bertolacci (yellow card) 16'; Roncaglia (red card) 72'; Rincón (yellow card) 78'; Perotti (yellow card) 84'	Stadium: Stadio Artemio Franchi; Attendance: 34,058; Referee: Daniele Orsato

21 September 2014 3	Atalanta	0–1	Fiorentina	Bergamo
18:00 CEST (UTC+02:00)	Carmona (yellow card) 27'	Report	Gonzalo (yellow card) 48'; Kurtić 58'; Fernández (yellow card) 60'; Aquilani (yellow card) 67'; Gómez (yellow card) 90'	Stadium: Stadio Atleti Azzurri d'Italia; Attendance: 15,406; Referee: Carmine Russo

24 September 2014 4	Fiorentina	0–0	Sassuolo	Florence
20:45 CEST (UTC+02:00)	Gonzalo (yellow card) 29'; Bernardeschi (yellow card) 90+2'	Report	Vrsaljko (yellow card) 24'; Floro Flores (yellow card) 29'	Stadium: Stadio Artemio Franchi; Attendance: 28,175; Referee: Angelo Cervellera

28 September 2014 5	Torino	1–1	Fiorentina	Turin
15:00 CEST (UTC+02:00)	Moretti (yellow card) 18'; Sánchez (yellow card) 50'; Quagliarella 62'; Pérez (yellow card) 77'	Report	Babacar (yellow card) 20', (goal) 78'; Iličić (yellow card) 56'	Stadium: Stadio Olimpico di Torino; Attendance: 15,134; Referee: Paolo Valeri

5 October 2014 6	Fiorentina	3–0	Internazionale	Florence
20:45 CEST (UTC+02:00)	Babacar 7'; Cuadrado 19'; Kurtić (yellow card) 53'; Tomović 76', (yellow card) 77'	Report	Ranocchia (yellow card) 20'; D'Ambrosio (yellow card) 52'; Osvaldo (yellow card) 70'	Stadium: Stadio Artemio Franchi; Attendance: 34,279; Referee: Paolo Tagliavento

19 October 2014 7	Fiorentina	0–2	Lazio	Florence
12:30 CEST (UTC+02:00)	Pizarro (yellow card) 25'; Neto (yellow card) 90+2'	Report	Đorđević (yellow card) 31', (goal) 35'; Parolo (yellow card) 37'; Cavanda (yellow card) 45+1'; Marchetti (yellow card) 53'; Radu (yellow card) 71'; Lulić 90+2'	Stadium: Stadio Artemio Franchi; Attendance: 30,967; Referee: Sebastiano Peruzzo

26 October 2014 8	Milan	1–1	Fiorentina	Milan
20:45 CET (UTC+01:00)	De Jong 25', (yellow card) 78'; Muntari (yellow card) 61'	Report	Cuadrado (yellow card) 40'; Iličić 64'; Gonzalo (yellow card) 88'	Stadium: San Siro; Attendance: 38,384; Referee: Luca Banti

29 October 2014 9	Fiorentina	3–0	Udinese	Florence
20:45 CET (UTC+01:00)	Alonso (yellow card) 17'; Babacar 44', 70'; Savić (yellow card) 60'; Valero 80'	Report	Fernandes (yellow card) 52'; Allan (yellow card) 55'; Piris (yellow card) 67'	Stadium: Stadio Artemio Franchi; Attendance: 27,016; Referee: Davide Massa

2 November 2014 10	Sampdoria	3–1	Fiorentina	Genoa
15:00 CET (UTC+01:00)	Palombo 27' (pen.), (yellow card) 32'; Rizzo 43', (yellow card) 57'; Obiang (yellow card) 55'; Éder 77'	Report	Richards (yellow card) 19'; Cuadrado (yellow card) 42'; Savić 45'; Gonzalo (yellow card) 58'; Babacar (yellow card) 59'	Stadium: Stadio Luigi Ferraris; Attendance: 20,822; Referee: Piero Giacomelli

9 November 2014 11	Fiorentina	0–1	Napoli	Florence
18:00 CET (UTC+01:00)	Iličić (yellow card) 38'; Savić (yellow card) 54'; Cuadrado (yellow card) 90+3'	Report	Koulibaly (yellow card) 32'; Jorginho (yellow card) 57'; Higuaín 61'; Henrique (yellow card) 90+1'	Stadium: Stadio Artemio Franchi; Attendance: 31,987; Referee: Paolo Valeri

23 November 2014 12	Hellas Verona	1–2	Fiorentina	Verona
15:00 CET (UTC+01:00)	Campanharo (yellow card) 26'; López 39'; Christodoulopoulos (yellow card) 87'	Report	Gonzalo 16'; Pizarro (yellow card) 36'; Neto (yellow card) 40'; Valero (yellow card) 42'; Cuadrado 62'; Basanta (yellow card) 80'	Stadium: Stadio Marc'Antonio Bentegodi; Attendance: 21,553; Referee: Marco Di Bello

30 November 2014 13	Cagliari	0–4	Fiorentina	Cagliari
15:00 CET (UTC+01:00)	Ibarbo (yellow card) 36'; Ceppitelli (yellow card) 53'	Report	Valero (yellow card) 7'; Fernández 17', 55'; Alonso (yellow card) 31'; Gómez 69'; Cuadrado 74'	Stadium: Stadio Sant'Elia; Attendance: 11,000; Referee: Gianpaolo Calvarese

5 December 2014 14	Fiorentina	0–0	Juventus	Florence
20:45 CET (UTC+01:00)	Pizarro (yellow card) 28'; Cuadrado (yellow card) 40'	Report	Ogbonna (yellow card) 35'; Chiellini (yellow card) 38'; Pogba (yellow card) 58'	Stadium: Stadio Artemio Franchi; Attendance: 38,160; Referee: Nicola Rizzoli

14 December 2014 15	Cesena	1–4	Fiorentina	Cesena
18:00 CET (UTC+01:00)	Volta (yellow card) 18' (yellow-red card) 77'; Cascione (yellow card) 58'; Savić 60' (o.g.); Coppola (yellow card) 71'	Report	Valero 44', (yellow card) 49'; Savić 47'; Gonzalo 79'; El Hamdaoui 90+3'	Stadium: Stadio Dino Manuzzi; Attendance: 16,275; Referee: Daniele Orsato

21 December 2014 16	Fiorentina	1–1	Empoli	Florence
15:00 CET (UTC+01:00)	Vargas 44'; El Hamdaoui (yellow card) 88'; Valero (yellow card) 90+1'; Aquilani (yellow card) 90+2'	Report	Maccarone (yellow card) 32'; Tonelli 57'; Pucciarelli (yellow card) 89'; Valdifiori (yellow card) 90+1'; Zieliński (yellow card) 90+1'	Stadium: Stadio Artemio Franchi; Attendance: 34,162; Referee: Carmine Russo

6 January 2015 17	Parma	1–0	Fiorentina	Parma
15:00 CET (UTC+01:00)	Costa 11'; De Ceglie (yellow card) 33'; Gobbi (yellow card) 35'; Lucarelli (yellow card) 66'; Bidaoui (yellow card) 78'; Cassano (yellow card) 86'; Mirante (yellow card) 88'	Report	Gonzalo (yellow card) 29' (yellow-red card) 79'; Savić (yellow card) 35' (yellow-red card) 86'	Stadium: Stadio Ennio Tardini; Attendance: 12,641; Referee: Antonio Damato

11 January 2015 18	Fiorentina	4–3	Palermo	Florence
15:00 CET (UTC+01:00)	Pasqual 20'; Tomović (yellow card) 42'; Basanta 51', (yellow card) 83'; Valero (yellow card) 63'; Cuadrado 64'; Joaquín 74', (yellow card) 76'	Report	Rigoni (yellow card) 41'; Quaison 59', 61'; Morganella (yellow card) 67'; Belotti 81' (pen.)	Stadium: Stadio Artemio Franchi; Attendance: 26,376; Referee: Paolo Mazzoleni

18 January 2015 19	Chievo	1–2	Fiorentina	Verona
15:00 CET (UTC+01:00)	Hetemaj (yellow card) 17'; Cesar (yellow card) 63'; Pellissier 72'	Report	Badelj (yellow card) 34'; Gonzalo 35'; Babacar 90+4'	Stadium: Stadio Marc'Antonio Bentegodi; Attendance: 10,000; Referee: Angelo Cervellera

25 January 2015 20	Fiorentina	1–1	Roma	Florence
20:45 CET (UTC+01:00)	Gómez 19'; Pizarro (yellow card) 57'; Cuadrado (yellow card) 90+1'	Report	Holebas (yellow card) 23'; Yanga-Mbiwa (yellow card) 25'; Ljajić 49'	Stadium: Stadio Artemio Franchi; Attendance: 28,899; Referee: Luca Banti

31 January 2015 21	Genoa	1–1	Fiorentina	Genoa
18:00 CET (UTC+01:00)	Tătărușanu 14' (o.g.); Burdisso (yellow card) 45' (yellow-red card) 81'; Sturaro (yellow card) 83'	Report	Gonzalo 54'; Valero (yellow card) 73'	Stadium: Stadio Luigi Ferraris; Attendance: 18,829; Referee: Nicola Rizzoli

8 February 2015 22	Fiorentina	3–2	Atalanta	Florence
12:30 CET (UTC+01:00)	Basanta 18'; Diamanti 76'; Pasqual 89'; Gómez (yellow card) 90+2'	Report	Zappacosta 9'; Bellini (yellow card) 40'; Boakye 83'	Stadium: Stadio Artemio Franchi; Attendance: 27,018; Referee: Dino Tommasi

14 February 2015 23	Sassuolo	1–3	Fiorentina	Reggio Emilia
18:00 CET (UTC+01:00)	Longhi (yellow card) 21'; Zaza (yellow card) 48'; Cannavaro (yellow card) 63'; Berardi 67'	Report	Salah 30'; Babacar 32', 62'; Alonso (yellow card) 34'; Savić (yellow card) 54'	Stadium: Mapei Stadium – Città del Tricolore; Attendance: 12,816; Referee: Daniele Doveri

22 February 2015 24	Fiorentina	1–1	Torino	Florence
20:45 CET (UTC+01:00)	Diamanti (yellow card) 34'; Salah 85'	Report	Vives (yellow card) 10', (goal) 87'; Peres (yellow card) 35'; Benassi (yellow card) 49'; Moretti (yellow card) 58'	Stadium: Stadio Artemio Franchi; Attendance: 27,088; Referee: Marco Guida

1 March 2015 25	Internazionale	0–1	Fiorentina	Milan
18:00 CET (UTC+01:00)	Vidić (yellow card) 49'; Juan Jesus (yellow card) 52'; Brozović (yellow card) 85'	Report	Aquilani (yellow card) 26'; Salah 55'; Diamanti (yellow card) 69'	Stadium: San Siro; Attendance: 39,310; Referee: Davide Massa

9 March 2015 26	Lazio	4–0	Fiorentina	Rome
19:00 CET (UTC+01:00)	Biglia 6'; Maurício (yellow card) 48'; Candreva 65' (pen.), (yellow card) 65'; Klose 75', 85'	Report	Basanta (yellow card) 28'; Kurtić (yellow card) 63'; Tomović (yellow card) 64'	Stadium: Stadio Olimpico; Attendance: 33,025; Referee: Paolo Tagliavento

16 March 2015 27	Fiorentina	2–1	Milan	Florence
19:00 CET (UTC+01:00)	Pasqual (yellow card) 52'; Gonzalo (yellow card) 60', (goal) 83'; Iličić (yellow card) 73'; Joaquín 89'	Report	Ménez (yellow card) 22'; Van Ginkel (yellow card) 29'; Mexès (yellow card) 34'; Destro 56'; López (yellow card) 76'	Stadium: Stadio Artemio Franchi; Attendance: 31,432; Referee: Carmine Russo

22 March 2015 28	Udinese	2–2	Fiorentina	Udine
20:45 CET (UTC+01:00)	Wagué 15', (yellow card) 49'; Kone 62'; Pinzi (yellow card) 69'; Danilo (yellow card) 72'	Report	Iličić (yellow card) 48'; Gómez 50', 53', (yellow card) 62'; Kurtić (yellow card) 57'	Stadium: Stadio Friuli; Attendance: 9,000; Referee: Massimiliano Irrati

4 April 2015 29	Fiorentina	2–0	Sampdoria	Florence
18:30 CEST (UTC+02:00)	Gonzalo (yellow card) 11'; Diamanti (yellow card) 44', (goal) 61'; Salah 64'	Report	Regini (yellow card) 69'	Stadium: Stadio Artemio Franchi; Attendance: 33,777; Referee: Luca Banti

12 April 2015 30	Napoli	3–0	Fiorentina	Naples
15:00 CEST (UTC+02:00)	Mertens 23'; Koulibaly (yellow card) 42'; Strinić (yellow card) 63'; Hamšík 71'; López (yellow card) 81'; Callejón 89'	Report	Vargas (yellow card) 42'	Stadium: Stadio San Paolo; Attendance: 21,804; Referee: Antonio Damato

20 April 2015 31	Fiorentina	0–1	Hellas Verona	Florence
20:45 CEST (UTC+02:00)	Iličić (yellow card) 10'; Rosi (yellow card) 68'	Report	Juanito (yellow card) 36'; Janković (yellow card) 38'; Sala (yellow card) 61'; Rafael (yellow card) 66'; Pisano (yellow card) 88'; Obbadi 90'	Stadium: Stadio Artemio Franchi; Attendance: 27,094; Referee: Paolo Mazzoleni

26 April 2015 32	Fiorentina	1–3	Cagliari	Florence
18:00 CEST (UTC+02:00)	Valero (yellow card) 9'; Gilardino 74'	Report	Čop 7', 59'; Avelar (yellow card) 21'; Ekdal (yellow card) 63'; Murru (yellow card) 72'; Farias (yellow card) 72', (goal) 90+2'; Sau (yellow card) 83'	Stadium: Stadio Artemio Franchi; Attendance: 27,560; Referee: Marco Guida

29 April 2015 33	Juventus	3–2	Fiorentina	Turin
20:45 CEST (UTC+02:00)	Llorente 36'; Tevez 45+1', 70'; Evra (yellow card) 49'	Report	Gonzalo 33' (pen.), (yellow card) 38'; Neto (yellow card) 34'; Aquilani (yellow card) 76'; Iličić 90'; Gilardino (yellow card) 90+2'	Stadium: Juventus Stadium; Attendance: 37,503; Referee: Luca Banti

3 May 2015 34	Fiorentina	3–1	Cesena	Florence
15:00 CEST (UTC+02:00)	Iličić 31' (pen.), 35', (yellow card) 68'; Gilardino 56'	Report	Rodríguez 59'; Capelli (yellow card) 69'	Stadium: Stadio Artemio Franchi; Attendance: 28,675; Referee: Daniele Doveri

10 May 2015 35	Empoli	2–3	Fiorentina	Empoli
18:00 CEST (UTC+02:00)	Saponara 27'; Mchedlidze 77', (yellow card) 83'	Report	Iličić 4', 68'; Badelj (yellow card) 23'; Vargas (yellow card) 33'; Salah 57'	Stadium: Stadio Carlo Castellani; Attendance: 9,878; Referee: Andrea Gervasoni

17 May 2015 36	Fiorentina	3–0	Parma	Florence
19:00 CEST (UTC+02:00)	Gonzalo 13'; Gilardino 30'; Salah 56'; Diamanti (yellow card) 81'	Report	Mendes (yellow card) 77'	Stadium: Stadio Artemio Franchi; Attendance: 27,179; Referee: Dino Tommasi

24 May 2015 37	Palermo	2–3	Fiorentina	Palermo
15:00 CEST (UTC+02:00)	Jajalo 26'; Rigoni (yellow card) 38', (goal) 69'; Quaison (yellow card) 90+6'	Report	Iličić 23'; Gilardino 33'; Gonzalo (yellow card) 39'; Pasqual (yellow card) 65'; Alonso 78'; Kurtić (yellow card) 90' (yellow-red card) 90+3'; Neto (yellow card) 90+5'	Stadium: Stadio Renzo Barbera; Attendance: 27,429; Referee: Piero Giacomelli

31 May 2015 38	Fiorentina	3–0	Chievo	Florence
20:45 CEST (UTC+02:00)	Iličić 12'; Bernardeschi (yellow card) 50', (goal) 76'; Badelj (yellow card) 85', (goal) 90+3'	Report	Dainelli (yellow card) 24'; Cofie (yellow card) 32' (yellow-red card) 69'	Stadium: Stadio Artemio Franchi; Attendance: 30,299; Referee: Paolo Valeri

=== Coppa Italia ===
21 January 2015 Round of 16	Fiorentina	3–1	Atalanta	Florence
18:00 CET (UTC+01:00)	Gómez 6', 28'; Cuadrado 12' (pen.); Alonso (yellow card) 81' (yellow-red card) 84'		Boakye (yellow card) 34'; Bianchi 40'; Baselli (yellow card) 56'; Gómez (yellow card) 68'; Biava (yellow card) 71'; Scaloni (yellow card) 90+5'	Stadium: Stadio Artemio Franchi; Attendance: 19,605; Referee: Paolo Valeri

3 February 2015 Quarter-finals	Roma	0–2	Fiorentina	Rome
20:45 CET (UTC+01:00)	Nainggolan (yellow card) 47'; Astori (yellow card) 84'		Badelj (yellow card) 35'; Valero (yellow card) 64'; Gómez 65', 89'	Stadium: Stadio Olimpico; Attendance: 24,315; Referee: Antonio Damato

5 March 2015 Semi-finals; First leg	Juventus	1–2	Fiorentina	Turin
20:45 CET (UTC+01:00)	Llorente 24'; Pogba (yellow card) 36'; Cáceres (yellow card) 73'; Marchisio (yellow card) 77'; Tevez (yellow card) 90+1'		Salah 11', 56'; Kurtić (yellow card) 17'; Badelj (yellow card) 41'; Basanta (yellow card) 67'; Fernández (yellow card) 86'	Stadium: Juventus Stadium; Attendance: 40,211; Referee: Paolo Valeri

7 April 2015 Semi-finals; Second leg	Fiorentina	0–3 (2–4 agg.)	Juventus	Florence
20:45 CEST (UTC+02:00)	Gonzalo (yellow card) 61'; Fernández (yellow card) 71'		Matri 21'; Sturaro (yellow card) 30'; Chiellini (yellow card) 40'; Pereyra 44'; Bonucci 59'; Marchisio (yellow card) 61'; Vidal (yellow card) 78'; Morata (red card) 87'	Stadium: Stadio Artemio Franchi; Attendance: 30,346; Referee: Davide Massa

=== UEFA Europa League ===
==== Group stage ====
Pos	Team	Pld	W	D	L	GF	GA	GD	Pts	Qualification	FIO	GUI	PAO	DMI
1	(Italy) Fiorentina	6	4	1	1	11	4	+7	13	Advance to knockout phase	—	3–0	1–1	1–2
2	(France) Guingamp	6	3	1	2	7	6	+1	10	Advance to knockout phase	1–2	—	2–0	2–0
3	(Greece) PAOK	6	2	1	3	10	7	+3	7		0–1	1–2	—	6–1
4	(Belarus) Dinamo Minsk	6	1	1	4	3	14	−11	4		0–3	0–0	0–2	—

Source: Soccerway
Rules for classification: Group stage tiebreakers

18 September 2014 1	Fiorentina (Italy)	3–0	(France) Guingamp	Florence, Italy
21:05 CEST (UTC+02:00)	Vargas 34'; Kurtić (yellow card) 52'; Cuadrado 67'; Basanta (yellow card) 79'; Bernardeschi 88'	Report	Diallo (yellow card) 24' (yellow-red card) 38'; Marveaux (yellow card) 39'; Beauvue (yellow card) 81'	Stadium: Stadio Artemio Franchi; Attendance: 32,000; Referee: Harald Lechner (Austria)

2 October 2014 2	Dinamo Minsk (Belarus)	0–3	(Italy) Fiorentina	Barysaw, Belarus
19:00 CEST (UTC+02:00)		Report	Basanta (yellow card) 24'; Aquilani 33'; Iličić 62'; Bernardeschi 67'	Stadium: Borisov Arena; Attendance: 5,500; Referee: Paweł Gil (Poland)

23 October 2014 3	PAOK (Greece)	0–1	(Italy) Fiorentina	Thessaloniki, Greece
19:00 CEST (UTC+02:00)	Kitsiou (yellow card) 19'; Rat (yellow card) 34'	Report	Vargas (yellow card) 24', (goal) 38'	Stadium: Toumba Stadium; Attendance: 20,000; Referee: Felix Zwayer (Germany)

6 November 2014 4	Fiorentina (Italy)	1–1	(Greece) PAOK	Florence, Italy
21:05 CET (UTC+01:00)	Pasqual 88'	Report	Kitsiou (yellow card) 28'; Martens 81'	Stadium: Stadio Artemio Franchi; Attendance: 10,000; Referee: Sébastien Delferiere (Belgium)

27 November 2014 5	Guingamp (France)	1–2	(Italy) Fiorentina	Guingamp, France
19:00 CET (UTC+01:00)	Beauvue 45' (pen.)	Report	Marin 6'; Babacar 13', (yellow card) 57'; Aquilani (yellow card) 41'; Basanta (red card) 44'; Savić (yellow card) 90+3'	Stadium: Stade du Roudourou; Attendance: 5,519; Referee: Aleksei Eskov (Russia)

11 December 2014 6	Fiorentina (Italy)	1–2	(Belarus) Dinamo Minsk	Florence, Italy
21:05 CET (UTC+01:00)	Minelli (yellow card) 75'; Marin 88'; Kurtić (yellow card) 90+3'	Report	Veratsila (yellow card) 12' (yellow-red card) 90+2'; Kantsavy 39'; Nikolić 55'; Hutar (yellow card) 90+3'	Stadium: Stadio Artemio Franchi; Attendance: 7,562; Referee: Cristian Balaj (Romania)

==== Knockout phase ====
===== Round of 32 =====
19 February 2015 First leg	Tottenham Hotspur (England)	1–1	(Italy) Fiorentina	London, England
21:05 CET (UTC+01:00)	Soldado 6', (yellow card) 36'	Report	Gonzalo (yellow card) 5'; Basanta 36'; Savić (yellow card) 51'	Stadium: White Hart Lane; Attendance: 34,235; Referee: Carlos Velasco Carballo (Spain)

26 February 2015 Second leg	Fiorentina (Italy)	2–0 (3–1 agg.)	(England) Tottenham Hotspur	Florence, Italy
19:00 CET (UTC+01:00)	Badelj (yellow card) 36'; Gómez 54'; Salah 71', (yellow card) 72'	Report	Davies (yellow card) 50'	Stadium: Stadio Artemio Franchi; Attendance: 29,886; Referee: Hüseyin Göçek (Turkey)

===== Round of 16 =====
12 March 2015 First leg	Fiorentina (Italy)	1–1	(Italy) Roma	Florence, Italy
21:05 CET (UTC+01:00)	Iličić 17', (yellow card) 45+1'; Pizarro (yellow card) 31'; Alonso (yellow card) 33'; Neto (yellow card) 59'; Badelj (yellow card) 67'	Report	Nainggolan (yellow card) 30'; Keita 77'	Stadium: Stadio Artemio Franchi; Attendance: 23,357; Referee: Antonio Mateu Lahoz (Spain)

19 March 2015 Second leg	Roma (Italy)	0–3 (1–4 agg.)	(Italy) Fiorentina	Rome, Italy
19:00 CET (UTC+01:00)	Ljajić (yellow card) 78' (yellow-red card) 88'	Report	Basanta (yellow card) 9', (goal) 22'; Gonzalo 10' (pen.); Alonso 18'	Stadium: Stadio Olimpico; Attendance: 30,591; Referee: Cüneyt Çakır (Turkey)

===== Quarter-finals =====
16 April 2015 First leg	Dynamo Kyiv (Ukraine)	1–1	(Italy) Fiorentina	Kyiv, Ukraine
21:05 CEST (UTC+02:00)	Lens 36', (yellow card) 72'; Dragović (yellow card) 44'; Sydorchuk (yellow card) 65'; Khacheridi (yellow card) 69'	Report	Gómez (yellow card) 45+2'; Alonso (yellow card) 66'; Babacar 90+2'; Tomović (yellow card) 90+4'	Stadium: Olimpiyskiy NSC; Attendance: 65,535; Referee: Szymon Marciniak (Poland)

23 April 2015 Second leg	Fiorentina (Italy)	2–0 (3–1 agg.)	(Ukraine) Dynamo Kyiv	Florence, Italy
21:05 CEST (UTC+02:00)	Gómez 43'; Vargas 90+4'	Report	Lens (yellow card) 14' (yellow-red card) 40'	Stadium: Stadio Artemio Franchi; Attendance: 28,058; Referee: Jonas Eriksson (Sweden)

===== Semi-finals =====
7 May 2015 First leg	Sevilla (Spain)	3–0	(Italy) Fiorentina	Seville, Spain
21:05 CEST (UTC+02:00)	Vidal 17', 52'; Carriço (yellow card) 46'; Gameiro 75'; Krychowiak (yellow card) 83'	Report	Alonso (yellow card) 70'; Valero (yellow card) 78'; Gonzalo (yellow card) 90+5'	Stadium: Ramón Sánchez Pizjuán; Attendance: 35,840; Referee: Felix Brych (Germany)

14 May 2015 Second leg	Fiorentina (Italy)	0–2 (0–5 agg.)	(Spain) Sevilla	Florence, Italy
21:05 CEST (UTC+02:00)	Pizarro (yellow card) 21'; Savić (yellow card) 26'; Valero (yellow card) 49'	Report	Bacca 22'; Carriço 27'; Banega (yellow card) 34'	Stadium: Stadio Artemio Franchi; Attendance: 32,466; Referee: Damir Skomina (Slovenia)

== Statistics ==
=== Appearances and goals ===
No.	Pos	Nat	Player	Total		Serie A		Coppa Italia		Europa League	
No.	Pos	Nat	Player	Apps	Goals	Apps	Goals	Apps	Goals	Apps	Goals
Goalkeepers
1	GK	(Brazil) BRA	Neto	38	0	29	0	2	0	7	0
12	GK	(Romania) ROU	Ciprian Tătărușanu	18	0	9	0	2	0	7	0
21	GK	(Italy) ITA	Cristiano Lupatelli	0	0	0	0	0	0	0	0
24	GK	(Italy) ITA	Luca Lezzerini	0	0	0	0	0	0	0	0
31	GK	(Italy) ITA	Antonio Rosati	0	0	0	0	0	0	0	0
Defenders
2	DF	(Argentina) ARG	Gonzalo Rodríguez	43	8	30	7	3	0	9+1	1
4	DF	(England) ENG	Micah Richards	19	0	7+3	0	2	0	5+2	0
15	DF	(Montenegro) MNE	Stefan Savić	41	2	28+1	2	3	0	8+1	0
19	DF	(Argentina) ARG	José María Basanta	37	4	23+1	2	3	0	10	2
23	DF	(Italy) ITA	Manuel Pasqual	28	3	16+4	2	1	0	5+2	1
28	DF	(Spain) ESP	Marcos Alonso	35	2	19+3	1	3	0	7+3	1
35	DF	(Croatia) CRO	Ricardo Bagadur	1	0	0+1	0	0	0	0	0
40	DF	(Serbia) SRB	Nenad Tomović	37	1	22+2	1	1+1	0	10+1	0
Midfielders
5	MF	(Croatia) CRO	Milan Badelj	37	1	18+3	1	3	0	9+4	0
6	MF	(Peru) PER	Juan Manuel Vargas	29	4	8+11	1	1	0	6+3	3
7	MF	(Chile) CHI	David Pizarro	37	0	18+8	0	1	0	7+3	0
10	MF	(Italy) ITA	Alberto Aquilani	34	1	17+8	0	1+1	0	2+5	1
14	MF	(Chile) CHI	Matías Fernández	41	2	23+6	2	2+2	0	7+1	0
16	MF	(Slovenia) SVN	Jasmin Kurtić	28	1	15+6	1	2	0	5	0
17	MF	(Spain) ESP	Joaquín	34	2	14+9	2	3	0	8	0
18	MF	(Italy) ITA	Alessandro Diamanti	15	2	9+2	2	1+3	0	0	0
20	MF	(Spain) ESP	Borja Valero	42	2	25+3	2	3	0	10+1	0
32	MF	(Italy) ITA	Andrea Lazzari	9	0	1+2	0	0	0	3+3	0
38	MF	(Italy) ITA	Aleandro Rosi	4	0	3+1	0	0	0	0	0
72	MF	(Slovenia) SVN	Josip Iličić	34	10	17+8	8	0+2	0	4+3	2
Forwards
9	FW	(Italy) ITA	Alberto Gilardino	14	4	8+6	4	0	0	0	0
22	FW	(Italy) ITA	Giuseppe Rossi	0	0	0	0	0	0	0	0
29	FW	(Italy) ITA	Federico Bernardeschi	10	3	1+6	1	0	0	2+1	2
30	FW	(Senegal) SEN	Khouma Babacar	28	9	14+6	7	0+3	0	2+3	2
33	FW	(Germany) GER	Mario Gómez	32	10	16+4	4	4	4	8	2
43	FW	(Italy) ITA	Simone Minelli	1	0	0	0	0	0	0+1	0
74	FW	(Egypt) EGY	Mohamed Salah	26	9	10+6	6	2	2	8	1
77	FW	(Morocco) MAR	Mounir El Hamdaoui	3	1	0+3	1	0	0	0	0
Players transferred out during the season
8	MF	(Germany) GER	Marko Marin	4	2	0	0	0	0	2+2	2
11	MF	(Colombia) COL	Juan Cuadrado	23	6	17	4	1	1	3+2	1
25	MF	(Australia) AUS	Joshua Brillante	2	0	1+1	0	0	0	0	0

Last updated: 31 May 2015
Source: Competitions

=== Goalscorers ===
Rank	No.	Pos	Nat	Name	Serie A	Coppa Italia	UEFA EL	Total
1	33	FW	(Germany)	Mario Gómez	4	4	2	10
1	72	MF	(Slovenia)	Josip Iličić	8	0	2	10
3	30	FW	(Senegal)	Khouma Babacar	7	0	2	9
3	74	FW	(Egypt)	Mohamed Salah	6	2	1	9
5	2	DF	(Argentina)	Gonzalo Rodríguez	7	0	1	8
6	11	MF	(Colombia)	Juan Cuadrado	4	1	1	6
7	6	MF	(Peru)	Juan Manuel Vargas	1	0	3	4
7	9	FW	(Italy)	Alberto Gilardino	4	0	0	4
7	19	DF	(Argentina)	José María Basanta	2	0	2	4
10	23	DF	(Italy)	Manuel Pasqual	2	0	1	3
10	29	FW	(Italy)	Federico Bernardeschi	1	0	2	3
12	8	MF	(Germany)	Marko Marin	0	0	2	2
12	14	MF	(Chile)	Matías Fernández	2	0	0	2
12	15	DF	(Montenegro)	Stefan Savić	2	0	0	2
12	17	MF	(Spain)	Joaquín	2	0	0	2
12	18	MF	(Italy)	Alessandro Diamanti	2	0	0	2
12	20	MF	(Spain)	Borja Valero	2	0	0	2
12	28	DF	(Spain)	Marcos Alonso	1	0	1	2
19	5	MF	(Croatia)	Milan Badelj	1	0	0	1
19	10	MF	(Italy)	Alberto Aquilani	0	0	1	1
19	16	MF	(Slovenia)	Jasmin Kurtić	1	0	0	1
19	40	DF	(Serbia)	Nenad Tomović	1	0	0	1
19	77	FW	(Morocco)	Mounir El Hamdaoui	1	0	0	1
Own goal					0	0	0	0
Totals					61	7	21	89

Last updated: 31 May 2015

=== Clean sheets ===
Rank	No.	Pos	Nat	Name	Serie A	Coppa Italia	UEFA EL	Total
1	1	GK	(Brazil)	Neto	10	0	3	13
2	12	GK	(Romania)	Ciprian Tătărușanu	1	1	3	5
Totals					11	1	6	18

Last updated: 31 May 2015

=== Disciplinary record ===
No.	Pos	Nat	Name	Serie A			Coppa Italia			UEFA EL			Total		
No.	Pos	Nat	Name	Booked	(yellow card) (yellow-red card)	Sent off (straight red)	Booked	(yellow card) (yellow-red card)	Sent off (straight red)	Booked	(yellow card) (yellow-red card)	Sent off (straight red)	Booked	(yellow card) (yellow-red card)	Sent off (straight red)
1	GK	(Brazil)	Neto	4	0	0	0	0	0	1	0	0	5	0	0
12	GK	(Romania)	Ciprian Tătărușanu	0	0	0	0	0	0	0	0	0	0	0	0
21	GK	(Italy)	Cristiano Lupatelli	0	0	0	0	0	0	0	0	0	0	0	0
24	GK	(Italy)	Luca Lezzerini	0	0	0	0	0	0	0	0	0	0	0	0
31	GK	(Italy)	Antonio Rosati	0	0	0	0	0	0	0	0	0	0	0	0
2	DF	(Argentina)	Gonzalo Rodríguez	9	1	0	1	0	0	2	0	0	12	1	0
4	DF	(England)	Micah Richards	1	0	0	0	0	0	0	0	0	1	0	0
15	DF	(Montenegro)	Stefan Savić	4	1	0	0	0	0	3	0	0	7	1	0
19	DF	(Argentina)	José María Basanta	3	0	0	1	0	0	3	0	1	7	0	1
23	DF	(Italy)	Manuel Pasqual	2	0	0	0	0	0	0	0	0	2	0	0
28	DF	(Spain)	Marcos Alonso	4	0	0	0	1	0	3	0	0	7	1	0
35	DF	(Croatia)	Ricardo Bagadur	0	0	0	0	0	0	0	0	0	0	0	0
40	DF	(Serbia)	Nenad Tomović	4	0	0	0	0	0	1	0	0	5	0	0
5	MF	(Croatia)	Milan Badelj	3	0	0	2	0	0	2	0	0	7	0	0
6	MF	(Peru)	Juan Manuel Vargas	2	0	0	0	0	0	1	0	0	3	0	0
7	MF	(Chile)	David Pizarro	4	0	0	0	0	0	2	0	0	6	0	0
8	MF	(Germany)	Marko Marin	0	0	0	0	0	0	0	0	0	0	0	0
10	MF	(Italy)	Alberto Aquilani	5	0	0	0	0	0	1	0	0	6	0	0
11	MF	(Colombia)	Juan Cuadrado	5	0	0	0	0	0	0	0	0	5	0	0
14	MF	(Chile)	Matías Fernández	1	0	0	2	0	0	0	0	0	3	0	0
16	MF	(Slovenia)	Jasmin Kurtić	3	1	0	1	0	0	2	0	0	6	1	0
17	MF	(Spain)	Joaquín	1	0	0	0	0	0	0	0	0	1	0	0
18	MF	(Italy)	Alessandro Diamanti	4	0	0	0	0	0	0	0	0	4	0	0
20	MF	(Spain)	Borja Valero	7	0	0	1	0	0	2	0	0	10	0	0
25	MF	(Australia)	Joshua Brillante	0	0	0	0	0	0	0	0	0	0	0	0
32	MF	(Italy)	Andrea Lazzari	0	0	0	0	0	0	0	0	0	0	0	0
38	MF	(Italy)	Aleandro Rosi	1	0	0	0	0	0	0	0	0	1	0	0
72	MF	(Slovenia)	Josip Iličić	6	0	0	0	0	0	1	0	0	7	0	0
9	FW	(Italy)	Alberto Gilardino	1	0	0	0	0	0	0	0	0	1	0	0
22	FW	(Italy)	Giuseppe Rossi	0	0	0	0	0	0	0	0	0	0	0	0
29	FW	(Italy)	Federico Bernardeschi	2	0	0	0	0	0	0	0	0	2	0	0
30	FW	(Senegal)	Khouma Babacar	2	0	0	0	0	0	1	0	0	3	0	0
33	FW	(Germany)	Mario Gómez	3	0	0	0	0	0	1	0	0	4	0	0
43	FW	(Italy)	Simone Minelli	0	0	0	0	0	0	1	0	0	1	0	0
74	FW	(Egypt)	Mohamed Salah	0	0	0	0	0	0	1	0	0	1	0	0
77	FW	(Morocco)	Mounir El Hamdaoui	1	0	0	0	0	0	0	0	0	1	0	0
Totals				82	1	0	8	1	0	28	0	1	118	2	1

Last updated: 31 May 2015
