= Pedro Marques (footballer, born April 1998) =

Portuguese footballer

Personal information
- Full name: Pedro David Rosendo Marques
- Date of birth: 25 April 1998 (age 28)
- Place of birth: Carcavelos, Portugal
- Height: 1.81 m (5 ft 11 in)
- Position: Striker

Team information
- Current team: Iraklis
- Number: 43

Youth career
- 2006–2007: Colégio Marista
- 2008–2009: Estoril
- 2010–2011: Foot 21
- 2011–2012: Estoril
- 2012–2016: Belenenses
- 2016–2017: Sporting CP

Senior career*
Years	Team	Apps	(Gls)
2016–2021	Sporting CP B	48	(19)
2018–2022	Sporting CP	0	(0)
2019	→ Dordrecht (loan)	19	(6)
2020	→ Den Bosch (loan)	7	(8)
2021	→ Gil Vicente (loan)	15	(5)
2021–2022	→ Famalicão (loan)	11	(0)
2022–2024	NEC	33	(5)
2023–2024	→ Apollon Limassol (loan)	31	(13)
2024–2026	Apollon Limassol	41	(13)
2026–	Iraklis	6	(2)

International career
2016	Portugal U18	2	(2)
2016–2017	Portugal U19	8	(2)
2017–2018	Portugal U20	6	(0)
- * Club domestic league appearances and goals as of 22:30, 20 October 2026 (UTC)

Pedro David Rosendo Marques (born 25 April 1998) is a Portuguese professional footballer who plays as a striker for Super League Greece club Iraklis.

== Club career ==
=== Sporting CP ===
Born in Carcavelos, Cascais, Marques spent much of his childhood at local G.D. Estoril Praia and C.F. Os Belenenses before joining Sporting CP in 2016. On 14 August that year, he made his professional debut with the latter's reserves against S.C. Covilhã, coming on as a 65th-minute substitute for Ricardo Almeida in the 2–1 LigaPro away win. He scored his first goal six days later, in a 2–4 home loss to AD Fafe. He netted twice more over the season, both in a 2–2 draw with Gil Vicente F.C. on 17 September.

Marques made his first-team debut on 13 December 2018 in the last game of the UEFA Europa League group stage at home against Ukraine's FC Vorskla Poltava, playing the last half-hour in place of Fredy Montero. The following 29 March, he was called up for the Primeira Liga match away to G.D. Chaves the next day.

Marques was loaned out on 15 July 2019 to FC Dordrecht of the Dutch Eerste Divisie. The following 22 January, he went to FC Den Bosch in the same league on the same basis. With 14 goals over the course of the campaign before its annulment due to the COVID-19 pandemic, he was fifth among its goalscorers; this included a hat-trick on 21 February 2020, albeit in a 6–4 defeat at Excelsior Rotterdam.

On 23 November 2020, Marques scored his first goals for the main Sporting team in the form of a brace in a 7–1 away victory over SG Sacavenense in the third round of the Taça de Portugal; he only needed 18 minutes to achieve this feat. In February 2021, he joined Gil Vicente on loan until 30 June.

Marques had his first top-flight experience at Gil, scoring five goals over what remained of the season; his first was to open a 4–2 win at Vitória S.C. on 14 March 2021. On 4 August that year he was lent to another team of the same league, F.C. Famalicão.

=== NEC ===
On 21 June 2022, Marques returned to Dutch football, signing for three years with an option for a fourth one with Eredivisie club NEC Nijmegen. On 13 November, he scored his second and third goals in the country's top tier, in a 6–1 home win over RKC Waalwijk.

=== Apollon Limassol ===
Marques was loaned to Apollon Limassol FC of the Cypriot First Division in September 2023. On 16 May 2024, having totalled 18 goals for the campaign, he joined the club on a permanent two-year contract.

=== Iraklis ===
On 13 August 2026, Marques signed for Greek side Iraklis on a free transfer.

== Career statistics ==
As of match played 30 May 2026

Appearances and goals by club, season and competition
Club	Season	League			National cup (Note: Includes Taça de Portugal, KNVB Cup, Cypriot Cup)		League cup (Note: Includes Taça da Liga)		Continental		Total	
Club	Season	Division	Apps	Goals	Apps	Goals	Apps	Goals	Apps	Goals	Apps	Goals
Sporting CP B	2016–17	LigaPro	8	3	–		–		–		8	3
Sporting CP B	2017–18	LigaPro	29	7	–		–		–		29	7
Sporting CP B	2020–21	Campeonato de Portugal	11	9	–		–		–		11	9
Sporting CP B	Total		48	19	–		–		–		48	19
Sporting CP	2018–19	Primeira Liga	0	0	0	0	0	0	1 (Note: Appearance in UEFA Europa League)	0	1	0
Sporting CP	2020–21	Primeira Liga	0	0	1	2	0	0	0	0	1	2
Sporting CP	Total		0	0	1	2	0	0	1	0	2	2
Dordrecht (loan)	2019–20	Eerste Divisie	19	6	2	0	–		–		21	6
Den Bosch (loan)	2019–20	Eerste Divisie	7	8	0	0	–		–		7	8
Gil Vicente (loan)	2020–21	Primeira Liga	15	5	0	0	–		–		15	5
Famalicão (loan)	2021–22	Primeira Liga	11	0	2	0	1	2	–		14	2
NEC	2022–23	Eredivisie	30	5	3	3	–		–		33	8
NEC	2023–24	Eredivisie	3	0	0	0	–		–		3	0
NEC	Total		33	5	3	3	–		–		36	8
Apollon Limassol (loan)	2023–24	Cypriot First Division	31	13	5	5	–		–		36	18
Apollon Limassol	2024–25	Cypriot First Division	13	4	3	0	–		–		16	4
Apollon Limassol	2025–26	Cypriot First Division	27	9	6	6	–		–		33	15
Apollon Limassol	Total		40	13	9	6	–		–		49	19
Career total			179	62	18	15	1	2	1	0	196	79
