= Albin Gashi =

Austrian footballer (born 1997)

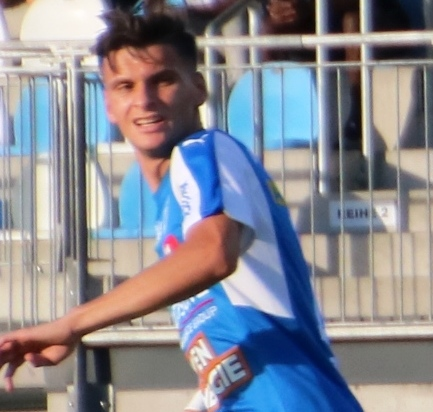
- Gashi with Floridsdorfer in August 2017

Personal information
- Date of birth: 24 January 1997 (age 29)
- Place of birth: Hollabrunn, Austria
- Height: 1.83 m (6 ft 0 in)
- Position: Attacking midfielder

Team information
- Current team: Austria Lustenau
- Number: 17

Youth career
- 2003–2004: Blau-Weiß Hollabrunn
- 2004–2005: ATSV Hollabrunn
- 2005–2007: Blau-Weiß Hollabrunn
- 2007–2008: Rapid Wien
- 2008–2009: Blau-Weiß Hollabrunn
- 2009–2014: Rapid Wien

Senior career*
Years	Team	Apps	(Gls)
2014–2019	Rapid Wien II	75	(11)
2017–2018	→ Floridsdorfer AC (loan)	26	(2)
2018	→ Den Bosch (loan)	3	(0)
2019	→ SV Horn (loan)	15	(1)
2019–2020	Floridsdorfer AC	22	(2)
2020–2021	Kukësi	30	(1)
2022–2023	SV Horn	40	(5)
2023–2025	Admira Wacker	54	(7)
2025–2026	Hertha Wels	29	(13)
2026–	Austria Lustenau	3	(0)

International career
2012–2013	Austria U16	12	(4)
2013–2014	Austria U17	10	(0)
2015	Austria U18	4	(3)
2015–2016	Austria U19	10	(1)
- * Club domestic league appearances and goals as of 15 August 2026

Albin Gashi (born 24 January 1997) is an Austrian professional footballer who plays as an attacking midfielder for Austrian Bundesliga club Austria Lustenau.

== Club career ==
=== Rapid Wien II ===
On 1 March 2014, Gashi made his debut with Rapid Wien II in Matchday 16 of 2013–14 Austrian Regionalliga against Wiener Viktoria after coming on as a substitute at 76th minute in place of Ferdinand Weinwurm.

==== Loan at Floridsdorfer ====
On 4 July 2017, Gashi joined Austrian Football Second League side Floridsdorfer AC, on a season-long loan. Ten days later, he made his debut with Floridsdorfer in the first round of 2017–18 Austrian Cup against SV Horn after being named in the starting line-up.

==== Loan at Den Bosch ====
On 14 August 2018, Gashi joined Eerste Divisie side Den Bosch, on a season-long loan. Ten days later, he made his debut in a 2–3 home defeat against RKC Waalwijk after coming on as a substitute at 74th minute in place of Sven Blummel.

==== Loan at SV Horn ====
On 24 January 2019, Gashi joined Austrian Football Second League side SV Horn, on a season-long loan. One month later, he made his debut in a 4–0 away defeat against Liefering after being named in the starting line-up.

=== Return to Floridsdorfer ===
On 16 July 2019, Gashi returned to Austrian Football Second League side Floridsdorfer AC. Four days later, he made his debut with Floridsdorfer in the first round of 2019–20 Austrian Cup against FC Wolfurt after coming on as a substitute at 46th minute in place of Martin Pajaczkowski.

=== Kukësi ===
On 4 August 2020, Gashi signed a two-year contract with Kategoria Superiore club Kukësi, to replace the departed Kristal Abazaj as the second choice. On 27 August 2020, he made his debut with Kukësi in the 2020–21 UEFA Europa League first qualifying round match against the Bulgarian side Slavia Sofia after coming on as a substitute at 46th minute in place of Enis Gavazaj.

=== Return to SV Horn ===
On 24 January 2022, Gashi signed a one-and-a-half-year contract with SV Horn. He made 43 competitive appearances during his second stint at the club, in which he scored six goals. In his final season at the club, he helped Horn to a fourth-place finish in the second tier.

=== Admira Wacker ===
Gashi joined 2. Liga club Admira Wacker on 20 June 2023, signing a two-year deal with the club. He made his debut for the club on 28 July, the first matchday of the season, coming off the bench in the second half of a 1–0 victory against SV Stripfing/Weiden.

=== FC Hertha Wels ===
On 15 July 2025, Gashi signed for FC Hertha Wels.

== International career ==
"Austria national team? It is not a priority for me. I want to give 100% for Kukësi and see what happens. I am Albanian and it would be an honor for me to represent the Albanian nation, whether with Albania, whether with Kosovo."

— Albin Gashi in an interview after presentation as player of Kukësi.

From 2012, until 2016, Gashi has been part of Austria at youth international level, respectively has been part of the U16, U17, U18 and U19 teams and he with these teams played 36 matches and scored 8 goals. On 1 July 2016, he was named as part of the Austria U19's 18-man squad for the 2016 UEFA European Under-19 Championship in Germany.
