= Dominik Reimann =

German footballer

Personal information
- Full name: Dominik Reimann
- Date of birth: 18 June 1997 (age 29)
- Place of birth: Münster, Germany
- Height: 1.86 m (6 ft 1 in)
- Position: Goalkeeper

Team information
- Current team: 1. FC Magdeburg
- Number: 1

Youth career
- –2004: ESV Münster
- 2004–2016: Borussia Dortmund

Senior career*
Years	Team	Apps	(Gls)
2016–2018	Borussia Dortmund II	35	(0)
2017–2018	Borussia Dortmund	0	(0)
2018–2021	Holstein Kiel	15	(0)
2018–2020	Holstein Kiel II	2	(0)
2021–	1. FC Magdeburg	169	(0)

International career^{‡}
2014–2015	Germany U18	7	(0)
2015–2016	Germany U19	5	(0)
2017	Germany U20	2	(0)
- * Club domestic league appearances and goals as of 18 May 2026 ‡ National team caps and goals as of 13:24, 29 July 2020 (UTC)

Dominik Reimann (born 18 June 1997) is a German professional footballer who plays as a goalkeeper for 1. FC Magdeburg.

== Club career ==
In May 2018, Reimann moved from Borussia Dortmund II to 2. Bundesliga club Holstein Kiel, signing a three-year contract lasting until 30 June 2021. He made his professional debut for Kiel in the 2. Bundesliga on 15 March 2019, starting in the home match against Erzgebirge Aue, which finished as a 5–1 win.

== International career ==
In October 2014, Reimann was called up to the Poland under-18 national team, though he did not make an appearance. Following this, he switched to representing Germany, making his under-18 debut on 13 November 2014 in a 4–0 friendly win against the Netherlands.

Reimann was included in hosts Germany's squad for the 2016 UEFA European Under-19 Championship in July 2016. He made two appearances in the group stage, with Germany being eliminated from title contention but ultimately still qualifying for the 2017 FIFA U-20 World Cup.

In 2017, Reimann was included in Germany's squad for the 2017 FIFA U-20 World Cup in South Korea. He made one appearance in the group stage of the tournament, a 2–0 loss to eventual runners-up Venezuela in Germany's opening match. Germany went on to reach the round of 16 of the tournament, where they were eliminated by Zambia following a 4–3 loss after extra time.

== Personal life ==
Reimann was born in Münster, North Rhine-Westphalia and is of Polish descent.

== Honours ==
1. FC Magdeburg

- 3. Liga: 2021–22
