= Anočić =

Anočić is a surname. Notable people with the surname include:

- Saša Anočić (1968–2021), Croatian actor
- Živko Anočić (born 1981), Croatian actor
- Mia Anočić Valentić (born 1990), Croatian actress
- Silvio Anočić (born 1997), Croatian footballer
