= Simone Minelli =

Italian footballer

Personal information
- Date of birth: 8 January 1997 (age 29)
- Place of birth: Carpi, Italy
- Height: 1.66 m (5 ft 5 in)
- Positions: Attacking midfielder; winger

Youth career
- –2014: Fiorentina

Senior career*
Years	Team	Apps	(Gls)
2015–2019	Fiorentina	0	(0)
2016–2017	→ AlbinoLeffe (loan)	26	(0)
2017–2018	→ Trapani (loan)	16	(1)
2019–2021	Teramo	9	(0)
2021–2022	Carpi	1	(0)
2022–2024	US Carpine 1954		

International career
2012	Italy U15	9	(3)
2012–2013	Italy U16	6	(1)
2013–2014	Italy U17	11	(3)
2014–2015	Italy U18	6	(3)
2015–2016	Italy U19	13	(1)
Medal record
Men's football
Representing Italy
UEFA European Under-19 Championship
Runner-up	2016 Germany
- * Club domestic league appearances and goals as of 14 October 2026

Simone Minelli (born 8 January 1997) is an Italian footballer who plays as a winger.

== Club career ==
=== Fiorentina ===
Minelli is a youth exponent from ACF Fiorentina. He made his senior debut on 11 December 2014 against FC Dinamo Minsk in a UEFA Europa League game. He replaced Juan Cuadrado after 24 minutes, and also provided an assist to Marko Marin's goal in a 1–2 home defeat.

==== Loan to AlbinoLeffe ====
On 30 August 2016, Minelli was signed by Serie C side Albinoleffe on a season-long loan deal. Four days later, on 3 September, he made his league debut for AlbinoLeffe as a substitute replacing Ferdinando Mastroianni in the 86th minute of a 1–1 away draw against Calcio Padova and ten more days later, on 13 September, Minelli played his first entire match for the club, a 2–2 away draw against Forlì. Minelli ended his season-long loan to AlbinoLeffe with 26 appearances, playing only 7 as a starter and including only 2 entire matches and playing 19 times as a substitute and remaining an unused substitute for 6 other matches.

==== Loan to Trapani ====
On 20 July 2017, Minelli was loaned to Serie C club Trapani on a season-long loan deal. Five weeks later, on 26 August, he made his Serie C debut for the club as a substitute replacing Manuel Marras in the 74th minute of a 1–0 home win over Siracusa and five more weeks later, on 30 September, he scored his first professional goal, as a substitute, in the 63rd minute of a 2–1 home win over Casertana. On 21 January 2018, Minelli was sent-off, as a substitute, a red card in the 93rd minute of a 1–0 away defeat against Sicula Leonzio. Minelli ended his season-long loan to Trapani with 17 appearances, including only 1 as a starter, and scoring 1 goal.

=== Teramo ===
On 1 August 2019, Minelli joined Serie C club Teramo on a free-transfer and he signed a 3-year contract. On 24 November he made his debut for the club as a substitute replacing Simone Magnaghi after 80 minutes of a 1–1 away draw against Bari. In his first season at Teramo he made only 9 appearances, all of them as a substitute. He did not make any appearances in the 2020–21 season as he was injured for the most of it. On 3 August 2021, his contract with Teramo was terminated by mutual consent.

=== Athletic Carpi ===
On 15 September 2021, he joined Athletic Carpi in Serie D.

== International career ==
Minelli is a former youth international for Italy, having represented Italy U19 in the 2016 UEFA European Under-19 Championship.

== Career statistics ==
=== Club ===
As of 10 October 2020

Club	Season	League			Cup		Europe		Other		Total	
Club	Season	League	Apps	Goals	Apps	Goals	Apps	Goals	Apps	Goals	Apps	Goals
AlbinoLeffe (loan)	2016–17	Serie C	26	0	0	0	—		—		26	0
Trapani (loan)	2017–18	Serie C	17	1	0	0	—		—		17	1
Fiorentina	2018–19	Serie A	0	0	0	0	—		—		0	0
Teramo	2019–20	Serie C	9	0	0	0	—		—		9	0
Career total			52	1	0	0	—		—		52	1

== Honours ==
=== International ===
Italy U19

- UEFA European Under-19 Championship runner-up: 2016
