= Brazile =

Brazile is a surname. Notable people with the surname include:

- Donna Brazile (born 1959), American political strategist, campaign manager, and political analyst
- Robert Brazile (born 1953), American football player
- Trevon Brazile (born 2003), American basketball player
- Trevor Brazile (born 1976), American rodeo champion

== See also ==
- Brazil
