= Alberto Picchi =

Italian footballer (born 1997)

Personal information
- Full name: Alberto Picchi
- Date of birth: 12 August 1997 (age 29)
- Place of birth: Livorno, Italy
- Height: 1.86 m (6 ft 1 in)
- Position: Midfielder

Team information
- Current team: Montevarchi
- Number: 8

Youth career
- Empoli

Senior career*
Years	Team	Apps	(Gls)
2016–2019	Empoli	3	(0)
2016–2017	→ SPAL (loan)	2	(0)
2018	→ Pistoiese (loan)	16	(3)
2018	→ Cremonese (loan)	0	(0)
2018–2019	→ Pistoiese (loan)	31	(0)
2019–2021	Arezzo	12	(0)
2021–2022	Lucchese	22	(1)
2022–2023	Siena	24	(0)
2023	Grosseto	3	(0)
2023–2024	Legnano	8	(0)
2024–	Montevarchi	9	(1)

International career^{‡}
2013–2014	Italy U17	3	(0)
2014–2015	Italy U18	5	(0)
2015–2016	Italy U19	14	(0)
2016–2018	Italy U20	7	(1)
Medal record
Men's football
Representing Italy
UEFA European Under-19 Championship
Runner-up	2016 Germany
- * Club domestic league appearances and goals as of 16 November 2024 ‡ National team caps and goals as of 25 April 2018

Alberto Picchi (born 12 August 1997) is an Italian footballer who plays as a midfielder for Serie D club Montevarchi.

== Club career ==
He made his professional debut in Serie B for SPAL on 17 December 2016 in a game against Pro Vercelli.

On 21 August 2019, he signed with Arezzo.

On 26 August 2021, he joined Lucchese on a one-year deal.

On 1 September 2022, Picchi signed a multi-year contract with Siena.

== International career ==
He represented the Italy national under-19 team at the 2016 UEFA European Under-19 Championship, where Italy finished as runners-up.

== Personal life ==
He is the nephew of the former footballer Armando Picchi.

== Honours ==
Italy U19

- UEFA European Under-19 Championship runner-up: 2016
