= Ricardo Almeida (footballer) =

Portuguese footballer

Personal information
- Full name: Ricardo Almeida Ribeiro
- Date of birth: 9 May 1997 (age 29)
- Place of birth: Guimarães, Portugal
- Height: 1.84 m (6 ft 0 in)
- Position: Forward

Team information
- Current team: Brito

Youth career
- 2005–2010: Serzedelo
- 2010–2016: Moreirense

Senior career*
Years	Team	Apps	(Gls)
2015–2020	Moreirense	3	(0)
2016–2018	→ Sporting CP B (loan)	25	(3)
2019–2020	→ Berço (loan)	21	(8)
2020–2021	Oleiros	20	(3)
2021–2022	São Martinho	22	(6)
2022–2023	Fontinhas	25	(4)
2023–2024	Limianos	14	(2)
2024	Dumiense	9	(0)
2024–	Brito	32	(10)

International career
2015	Portugal U18	3	(1)
2016	Portugal U19	7	(2)
- * Club domestic league appearances and goals as of 11:12, 9 December 2025 (UTC)

Ricardo Almeida Ribeiro (born 9 May 1997), known as Almeida, is a Portuguese professional footballer who plays as a forward for Brito.

== Club career ==
Born in Guimarães, Almeida played three Primeira Liga matches for Moreirense F.C. over three separate seasons, totalling roughly 30 minutes always as a second-half substitute. His first was on 23 May 2015, in a 2–1 away win against F.C. Arouca.

Almeida was loaned to LigaPro side Sporting CP B for two years on 5 August 2016, with a buying option. He scored his first goal in that league nine days later, equalising an eventual 2–1 away victory over S.C. Covilhã.

Subsequently, Almeida represented clubs in the third division, starting out at Berço SC (still owned by Moreirense) then switching to A.R.C. Oleiros in the summer of 2020.
