= 2016 UEFA European Under-19 Championship =

U-19-Fußball-Europameisterschaft 2016

Tournament details
- Host country: Germany
- Dates: 11–24 July
- Teams: 8 (from 1 confederation)
- Venues: 10 (in 9 host cities)

Final positions
- Champions: France (8th title)
- Runners-up: Italy

Tournament statistics
- Matches played: 16
- Goals scored: 55 (3.44 per match)
- Attendance: 162,972 (10,186 per match)
- Top scorer(s): (France) Jean-Kévin Augustin (6 goals)
- Best player: (France) Jean-Kévin Augustin

The 2016 UEFA European Under-19 Championship was the 15th edition of the UEFA European Under-19 Championship (65th edition if the Under-18 and Junior eras are included), the annual European international youth football championship contested by the men's under-19 national teams of UEFA member associations. Germany, which were selected by UEFA on 20 March 2012, hosted the tournament between 11 and 24 July 2016.

A total of eight teams competed in the final tournament, with players born on or after 1 January 1997 eligible to participate.

Same as previous editions held in even-numbered years, the tournament acted as the UEFA qualifiers for the FIFA U-20 World Cup. The top five teams qualified for the 2017 FIFA U-20 World Cup in South Korea as the UEFA representatives. This was decreased from the previous six teams, as FIFA decided to give one of the slots originally reserved for UEFA to the Oceania Football Confederation starting from 2017.

== Qualification ==
The national teams from all 54 UEFA member associations entered the competition. With Germany automatically qualified as hosts, the other 53 teams contested a qualifying competition to determine the remaining seven spots in the final tournament. The qualifying competition consisted of two rounds: the qualifying round, which took place in autumn 2015, and the elite round, which took place in spring 2016.

=== Qualified teams ===
The following eight teams qualified for the final tournament:

Note: All appearance statistics include only U-19 era (since 2002).

Team	Method of qualification	Finals appearance	Last appearance	Previous best performance
Germany	Hosts	8th	2015	Champions (2008, 2014)
England	Elite round Group 1 winners	8th	2012	Runners-up (2005, 2009)
Italy	Elite round Group 2 winners	5th	2010	Champions (2003)
Austria	Elite round Group 3 winners	7th	2015	Semi-finals (2003, 2006, 2014)
Netherlands	Elite round Group 4 winners	4th	2015	Group stage (2010, 2013, 2015)
Croatia	Elite round Group 5 winners	3rd	2012	Semi-finals (2010)
Portugal	Elite round Group 6 winners	8th	2014	Runners-up (2003, 2014)
France	Elite round Group 7 winners	9th	2015	Champions (2005, 2010)

=== Final draw ===
The final draw was held on 12 April 2016, 18:00 CEST (UTC+2), at the Mercedes-Benz Arena in Stuttgart, Germany. The eight teams were drawn into two groups of four teams. There was no seeding, except that hosts Germany were assigned to position A1 in the draw.

== Venues ==
The tournament was hosted in ten venues:

Aalen	Aspach	Heidenheim	Mannheim	Reutlingen
Städtisches Waldstadion; Capacity: 14,500	Mechatronik Arena; Capacity: 10,000	Voith-Arena; Capacity: 15,000	Carl-Benz-Stadion; Capacity: 27,000	Stadion an der Kreuzeiche; Capacity: 15,228
Scholz Arena	Mechatronik Arena	Voith-Arena	Carl-Benz-Stadion	Stadion an der Kreuzeiche
Sandhausen	Sinsheim	Stuttgart		Ulm
Hardtwaldstadion; Capacity: 15,300	Rhein-Neckar-Arena; Capacity: 30,150	Mercedes-Benz Arena; Capacity: 60,449	Gazi-Stadion auf der Waldau; Capacity: 11,490	Donaustadion; Capacity: 19,500
Hardtwaldstadion	Wirsol Rhein-Neckar-Arena	Mercedes-Benz Arena	Gazi-Stadion auf der Waldau	Donaustadion

== Squads ==
Each national team had to submit a squad of 18 players.

== Match officials ==
A total of 6 referees, 8 assistant referees and 2 fourth officials were appointed for the final tournament.

Referees

- Aliyar Aghayev (Azerbaijan)
- Alejandro Hernández Hernández (Spain)
- Radu Petrescu (Romania)
- Roi Reinshreiber (Israel)
- Bart Vertenten (Belgium)
- Anatoliy Zhabchenko (Ukraine)

Assistant referees

- Ridiger Çokaj (Albania)
- Igor Demeshko (Russia)
- Milutin Đukić (Montenegro)
- Vladimir Gerasimovs (Lithuania)
- Geir Oskar Isaksen (Norway)
- Douglas Ross (Scotland)
- Birkir Sigurðarson (Iceland)
- Manuel Vidali (Slovenia)

Fourth officials

- Nikola Dabanović (Montenegro)
- Alan Mario Sant (Malta)

== Group stage ==
Results of teams participating in 2016 UEFA European Under-19 Championship

The final tournament schedule was confirmed on 18 April 2016.

The group winners and runners-up advanced to the semi-finals and qualify for the 2017 FIFA U-20 World Cup. The third-placed teams entered the FIFA U-20 World Cup play-off.

Tiebreakers

The teams were ranked according to points (3 points for a win, 1 point for a draw, 0 points for a loss). If two or more teams were equal on points on completion of the group matches, the following tie-breaking criteria were applied, in the order given, to determine the rankings:

1. Higher number of points obtained in the group matches played among the teams in question;
2. Superior goal difference resulting from the group matches played among the teams in question;
3. Higher number of goals scored in the group matches played among the teams in question;
4. If, after having applied criteria 1 to 3, teams still had an equal ranking, criteria 1 to 3 were reapplied exclusively to the group matches between the teams in question to determine their final rankings. If this procedure did not lead to a decision, criteria 5 to 9 applied;
5. Superior goal difference in all group matches;
6. Higher number of goals scored in all group matches;
7. If only two teams had the same number of points, and they were tied according to criteria 1 to 6 after having met in the last round of the group stage, their rankings were determined by a penalty shoot-out (not used if more than two teams had the same number of points, or if their rankings were not relevant for qualification for the next stage).
8. Lower disciplinary points total based only on yellow and red cards received in the group matches (red card = 3 points, yellow card = 1 point, expulsion for two yellow cards in one match = 3 points);
9. Drawing of lots.

All times were local, CEST (UTC+2).

=== Group A ===
Pos	Team	Pld	W	D	L	GF	GA	GD	Pts	Qualification
1	Portugal	3	1	2	0	6	5	+1	5	Knockout stage and 2017 FIFA U-20 World Cup
2	Italy	3	1	2	0	3	2	+1	5	Knockout stage and 2017 FIFA U-20 World Cup
3	Germany (H)	3	1	0	2	6	5	+1	3	FIFA U-20 World Cup play-off
4	Austria	3	0	2	1	2	5	−3	2	

Source: UEFA
Rules for classification: Group stage tiebreakers
(H) Hosts
11 July 2016
12:00

Germany	0–1	Italy
	Report	Dimarco 78' (pen.)

Mercedes-Benz Arena, Stuttgart
Attendance: 54,689
Referee: Alejandro Hernández Hernández (Spain)
11 July 2016
19:00

Portugal	1–1	Austria
Empis 53'	Report	Jakupovic 10'

Mechatronik Arena, Aspach
Attendance: 2,158
Referee: Roi Reinshreiber (Israel)

14 July 2016
12:00

Italy	1–1	Austria
Locatelli 24'	Report	Schlager 21'

Stadion an der Kreuzeiche, Reutlingen
Attendance: 5,279
Referee: Aliyar Aghayev (Azerbaijan)
14 July 2016
19:30

Germany	3–4	Portugal
Ochs 12', 68' (pen.), 90+3' (pen.)	Report	Abubakar 37'; G. Rodrigues 48'; A. Silva 70'; Buta 73'

Mechatronik Arena, Aspach
Attendance: 7,250
Referee: Bart Vertenten (Belgium)

17 July 2016
19:30

Austria	0–3	Germany
	Report	Neumann 50'; Teuchert 52'; Gül 87'

Stadion an der Kreuzeiche, Reutlingen
Attendance: 13,328
Referee: Anatoliy Zhabchenko (Ukraine)
17 July 2016
19:30

Italy	1–1	Portugal
Dimarco 15' (pen.)	Report	Buta 86'

Gazi-Stadion auf der Waldau, Stuttgart
Attendance: 5,270
Referee: Radu Petrescu (Romania)

=== Group B ===
Pos	Team	Pld	W	D	L	GF	GA	GD	Pts	Qualification
1	England	3	3	0	0	6	3	+3	9	Knockout stage and 2017 FIFA U-20 World Cup
2	France	3	2	0	1	8	3	+5	6	Knockout stage and 2017 FIFA U-20 World Cup
3	Netherlands	3	1	0	2	5	8	−3	3	FIFA U-20 World Cup play-off
4	Croatia	3	0	0	3	2	7	−5	0	

Source: UEFA
Rules for classification: Group stage tiebreakers
12 July 2016
12:00

Croatia	1–3	Netherlands
Brekalo 43'	Report	Bergwijn 17', 85'; Lammers 33'

Donaustadion, Ulm
Attendance: 6,150
Referee: Anatoliy Zhabchenko (Ukraine)
12 July 2016
19:30

France	1−2	England
Augustin 33'	Report	Michelin 3' (o.g.); Solanke 9'

Voith-Arena, Heidenheim
Attendance: 2,344
Referee: Radu Petrescu (Romania)

15 July 2016
12:00

Netherlands	1–2	England
Lammers 10'	Report	Solanke 36'; Brown 90+2'

Donaustadion, Ulm
Attendance: 3,928
Referee: Roi Reinshreiber (Israel)
15 July 2016
19:30

Croatia	0–2	France
	Report	Augustin 37'; Mbappé 69'

Städtisches Waldstadion, Aalen
Attendance: 3,696
Referee: Alejandro Hernández Hernández (Spain)

18 July 2016
12:00

England	2–1	Croatia
Brown 4'; Anočić 10' (o.g.)	Report	Moro 58'

Voith-Arena, Heidenheim
Attendance: 7,400
Referee: Aliyar Aghayev (Azerbaijan)
18 July 2016
12:00

Netherlands	1–5	France
Nouri 36' (pen.)	Report	Mbappé 10', 63'; Augustin 29', 48', 75'

Städtisches Waldstadion, Aalen
Attendance: 7,711
Referee: Bart Vertenten (Belgium)

== Knockout stage ==
In the knockout stage, extra time and penalty shoot-out were used to decide the winner if necessary.

On 2 May 2016, the UEFA Executive Committee agreed that the competition would be part of the International Football Association Board's trial to allow a fourth substitute to be made during extra time. In the FIFA U-20 World Cup play-off, Michel Vlap of the Netherlands became the first ever fourth substitute, replacing Laros Duarte at half-time in extra time, followed later by Emmanuel Iyoha of Germany replacing Jannes Horn in the 110th minute.

=== Bracket ===
Semi-finals
21 July – Mannheim
Portugal	1
France	3
21 July – Mannheim
England	1
Italy	2

Final
24 July – Sinsheim
France	4
Italy	0
World Cup play-off
21 July – Sandhausen
Germany	3 (5)
Netherlands	3 (4)

=== FIFA U-20 World Cup play-off ===
Winner qualified for 2017 FIFA U-20 World Cup.

21 July 2016
19:00

Germany	3–3 (a.e.t.)	Netherlands
Ochs 44'; Serdar 90+3'; Mehlem 96'	Report	Nouri 81'; Van der Heijden 88'; Lammers 111'
Penalties
Ochs (penalty scored); Gül (penalty scored); Mittelstädt (penalty scored); Condé (penalty missed); Gimber (penalty scored); Henrichs (penalty scored)	5–4	(penalty scored) Verdonk; (penalty scored) Lammers; (penalty scored) Van der Heijden; (penalty scored) Rosario; (penalty missed) Nouri; (penalty missed) Vlap

Hardtwaldstadion, Sandhausen
Attendance: 8,592
Referee: Alejandro Hernández Hernández (Spain)

=== Semi-finals ===
21 July 2016
12:00

England	1–2	Italy
Picchi 85' (o.g.)	Report	Dimarco 27' (pen.), 60'

Carl-Benz-Stadion, Mannheim
Attendance: 7,412
Referee: Roi Reinshreiber (Israel)

21 July 2016
17:00

Portugal	1–3	France
Pacheco 3'	Report	Blas 10'; Mbappé 67', 75'

Carl-Benz-Stadion, Mannheim
Attendance: 2,665
Referee: Radu Petrescu (Romania)

=== Final ===
24 July 2016
20:30

France	4–0	Italy
Augustin 6'; Blas 19'; Tousart 82'; Diop 90+2'	Report

Rhein-Neckar-Arena, Sinsheim
Attendance: 25,100
Referee: Aliyar Aghayev (Azerbaijan)

== Goalscorers ==
6 goals

- (France) Jean-Kévin Augustin

5 goals

- (France) Kylian Mbappé

4 goals

- (Germany) Philipp Ochs
- (Italy) Federico Dimarco

3 goals

- (Netherlands) Sam Lammers

2 goals

- (England) Isaiah Brown
- (England) Dominic Solanke
- (France) Ludovic Blas
- (Netherlands) Steven Bergwijn
- (Netherlands) Abdelhak Nouri
- (Portugal) Aurélio Buta

1 goal

- (Austria) Arnel Jakupovic
- (Austria) Xaver Schlager
- (Croatia) Josip Brekalo
- (Croatia) Nikola Moro
- (France) Issa Diop
- (France) Lucas Tousart
- (Germany) Gökhan Gül
- (Germany) Marvin Mehlem
- (Germany) Phil Neumann
- (Germany) Suat Serdar
- (Germany) Cedric Teuchert
- (Italy) Manuel Locatelli
- (Netherlands) Dennis van der Heijden
- (Portugal) Asumah Abubakar
- (Portugal) Pedro Empis
- (Portugal) Pedro Pacheco
- (Portugal) Gonçalo Rodrigues
- (Portugal) Alexandre Silva

1 own goal

- (Croatia) Silvio Anočić (playing against England)
- (France) Clément Michelin (playing against England)
- (Italy) Alberto Picchi (playing against England)

Source: UEFA.com

== Team of the Tournament ==
Goalkeepers

- (Italy) Alex Meret
- (Portugal) Pedro Silva

Defenders

- (England) Fikayo Tomori
- (France) Issa Diop
- (France) Christ-Emmanuel Maouassa
- (Germany) Phil Neumann
- (Italy) Filippo Romagna
- (Portugal) Rúben Dias

Midfielders

- (Austria) Xaver Schlager
- (France) Amine Harit
- (France) Lucas Tousart
- (Netherlands) Abdelhak Nouri
- (Portugal) Pêpê

Forwards

- (France) Jean-Kévin Augustin
- (France) Ludovic Blas
- (France) Kylian Mbappé
- (Netherlands) Sam Lammers
- (Portugal) Buta

Source: UEFA Technical Report

== Qualified teams for FIFA U-20 World Cup ==
The following five teams from UEFA qualified for the 2017 FIFA U-20 World Cup.

Team	Qualified on	Previous appearances in tournament^{1}
France	18 July 2016	5 (1977, 1997, 2001, 2011, **2013**)
Italy	17 July 2016	5 (1977, 1981, 1987, 2005, 2009)
England	15 July 2016	10 (1981, 1985, 1991, 1993, 1997, 1999, 2003, 2009, 2011, 2013)
Portugal	17 July 2016	10 (1979, **1989**, **1991**, 1993, 1995, 1999, 2007, 2011, 2013, 2015)
Germany	21 July 2016	10 (**1981**, 1987, 1993, 1995, 1999, 2001, 2003, 2005, 2009, 2015)

^{1} Bold indicates champion for that year. Italic indicates host for that year.
