= Silvio Anočić =

Croatian footballer

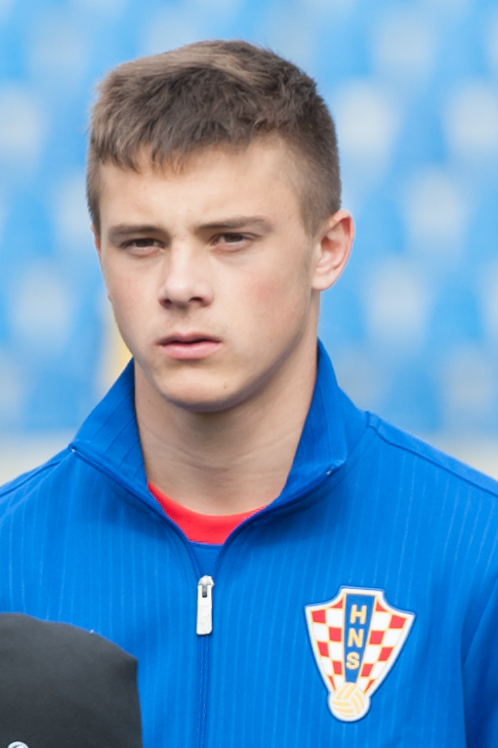

Personal information
- Date of birth: 10 September 1997 (age 29)
- Place of birth: Osijek, Croatia
- Height: 1.78 m (5 ft 10 in)
- Positions: Defender; midfielder; winger

Team information
- Current team: Belišće
- Number: 10

Youth career
- –2006: Valpovka Valpovo
- 2006–2014: Osijek
- 2014–2017: Roma

Senior career*
Years	Team	Apps	(Gls)
2017–2020	Roma	0	(0)
2019–2020	→ Cibalia (loan)	13	(2)
2020	Šibenik	4	(1)
2020–	Belišće		
- * Club domestic league appearances and goals

Silvio Anočić (born 10 September 1997 in Croatia) is a Croatian footballer, who currently plays for third-tier side Belišće.

== Club career ==
At the age of 16, Anočić signed for Italian Serie A side A.S. Roma.

In 2017, he was supposed to be sent on loan to Genoa C.F.C. in the Italian Serie A, but did not pass the medical examination due to inflammation, which ended up keeping him out for 28 months.

In 2019, Anočić was sent on loan to Croatian second division club HNK Cibalia.

In 2020, he signed for NK Belišće in the Croatian third division from top flight team HNK Šibenik.
