= 2023–24 Holstein Kiel season =

Holstein Kiel
2023–24 season
- Owner: Wolfgang Schwenke
- Chairman: Steffen Schneekloth
- Head coach: Marcel Rapp
- Stadium: Holstein-Stadion
- 2. Bundesliga: 2nd (promoted)
- DFB-Pokal: Second round
- Top goalscorer: League: Steven Skrzybski (10); All: Steven Skrzybski (10)
- Average home league attendance: 13,919
Home colours	Away colours	Third colours

The 2023–24 season was Holstein Kiel's 129th season in existence and seventh consecutive season in the 2. Bundesliga. They also competed in the DFB-Pokal.

== Players ==
=== First-team squad ===
As of 24 January 2024

Note: Flags indicate national team as defined under FIFA eligibility rules; some limited exceptions apply. Players may hold more than one non-FIFA nationality.

No.	Pos.	Nation	Player
1	GK	GER	Timon Weiner
2	DF	DEN	Mikkel Kirkeskov
3	DF	GER	Marco Komenda
4	DF	GER	Patrick Erras
5	DF	SWE	Carl Johansson
6	MF	SRB	Marko Ivezić
7	MF	GER	Steven Skrzybski
8	FW	GER	Finn Porath
9	FW	AUT	Benedikt Pichler
10	MF	GER	Lewis Holtby
11	FW	SWE	Alexander Bernhardsson
13	FW	JPN	Shuto Machino
15	MF	GER	Marvin Schulz
16	MF	GER	Philipp Sander (captain)
17	DF	GER	Timo Becker

No.	Pos.	Nation	Player
18	DF	GER	Tom Rothe (on loan from Borussia Dortmund)
19	FW	ISL	Hólmbert Friðjónsson
20	FW	GER	Fiete Arp
21	GK	GER	Thomas Dähne
22	MF	GER	Nicolai Remberg
23	DF	GER	Lasse Rosenboom
26	MF	GER	Lucas Wolf
27	FW	GER	Joshua Mees
28	MF	GER	Aurel Wagbe
29	MF	GER	Niklas Niehoff
31	GK	GER	Marcel Engelhardt
32	MF	GER	Jonas Sterner
34	DF	GER	Colin Kleine-Bekel
38	DF	USA	Nico Carrera

=== Out on loan ===
Note: Flags indicate national team as defined under FIFA eligibility rules; some limited exceptions apply. Players may hold more than one non-FIFA nationality.

No. / Pos. / Nation / Player; — / FW / GHA / Kwasi Okyere Wriedt (at VfL Osnabrück until 30 June 2024)	No. / Pos. / Nation / Player; — / FW / GER / Ba-Muaka Simakala (at 1. FC Kaiserslautern until 30 June 2024)

== Transfers ==
=== In ===
Pos.	Player	Transferred from	Fee	Date	Source

=== Out ===
Pos.	Player	Transferred from	Fee	Date	Source
MF	(Germany) Fabian Reese	(Germany) Hertha BSC	Free	1 July 2023	

== Pre-season and friendlies ==
Win Draw Loss Fixtures

1 July 2023 Friendly	SC Weiche Flensburg 08 (Germany)	0–1	(Germany) Holstein Kiel
18:00 CEST (UTC+2)			Friðjónsson 77'

7 July 2023 Friendly	Holstein Kiel (Germany)	1–2	(Germany) Hannover 96
13:00 CEST (UTC+2)

12 July 2023 Friendly	Holstein Kiel (Germany)	1–0	(Czech Republic) Slovácko
16:00 CEST (UTC+2)	Pichler 18'

15 July 2023 Friendly	Austria Lustenau	1–6	(Germany) Holstein Kiel
14:00 CEST (UTC+2)
Note: Match was played in three 45-minute periods.

22 July 2023 Friendly	Union Berlin (Germany)	1–2	(Germany) Holstein Kiel
15:00 CEST (UTC+2)
Note: Match was played in four 30-minute periods.

12 October 2023 Friendly	Holstein Kiel (Germany)	0–1	(Denmark) AGF
12:00 CEST (UTC+2)			Duncan 74'

6 January 2024 Friendly	Darmstadt 98 (Germany)	1–2	(Germany) Holstein Kiel	Oliva, Spain
13:00 UTC+1	Pfeiffer 89'		Holtby 34'; Niehoff 84'	Stadium: Oliva Nova Golf & Beach Resort Campo 1

9 January 2024 Friendly	Sint-Truiden (Belgium)	1–1	(Germany) Holstein Kiel
12:00 CET (UTC+1)

13 January 2024 Friendly	Hannover 96 (Germany)	3–2	(Germany) Holstein Kiel
13:00 CET (UTC+1)

== Competitions ==
=== Overall record ===
Competition	First match	Last match	Starting round	Final position	Record							
Competition	First match	Last match	Starting round	Final position	Pld	W	D	L	GF	GA	GD	Win %
2. Bundesliga	30 July 2023	19 May 2024	Matchday 1		33	20	5	8	63	38	+25	60.61
DFB-Pokal	13 August 2023	1 November 2023	First round	Second round	2	1	1	0	5	3	+2	50.00
Total					35	21	6	8	68	41	+27	60.00

Last updated: 11 May 2024
Source: Soccerway

=== 2. Bundesliga ===
==== League table ====
Pos	Team	Pld	W	D	L	GF	GA	GD	Pts	Qualification or relegation
1	FC St. Pauli (C, P)	34	20	9	5	62	36	+26	69	Promotion to Bundesliga
2	Holstein Kiel (P)	34	21	5	8	65	39	+26	68	Promotion to Bundesliga
3	Fortuna Düsseldorf	34	18	9	7	72	40	+32	63	Qualification for promotion play-offs
4	Hamburger SV	34	17	7	10	64	44	+20	58	
5	Karlsruher SC	34	15	10	9	68	48	+20	55	

Source: DFB
Rules for classification: 1) Points; 2) Goal difference; 3) Goals scored; 4) Head-to-head results; 5) Head-to-head away goals scored; 6) Away goals scored; 7) Play-off.
(Rules 4–6 only apply after home and away matches have been played between the tied teams.)
(C) Champions; (P) Promoted

==== Results summary ====
Overall								Home						Away					
Pld	W	D	L	GF	GA	GD	Pts	W	D	L	GF	GA	GD	W	D	L	GF	GA	GD
13	7	2	4	23	22	+1	23	3	1	3	13	14	−1	4	1	1	10	8	+2

Last updated: 11 November 2023.
Source: DFB

==== Results by round ====
Round	1	2	3	4	5	6	7	8	9	10	11	12	13	14	15	16	17	18	19	20	21	22	23	24	25	26	27	28	29	30	31
Ground	A	H	H	A	H	A	H	A	H	A	H	A	H	A	H	A	H	H	A	A	H	A	H	A	H	A	H	A	H	A	H
Result	W	W	L	W	W	L	L	W	D	W	L	D	W	W	W	W	W	L	L	D	W	W	L	D	W	W	W	W	W	W	
Position	6	2	5	3	2	3	7	4	4	3	4	5	3	3	2	2	1	2	3	3	2	2	2	2	2	2	2	2	1	1	

Updated to match(es) played on 20 April 2024. Source: DFB
A = Away; H = Home; W = Win; D = Draw; L = Loss

==== Matches ====
The league fixtures were unveiled on 30 June 2023.

30 July 2023 1	Eintracht Braunschweig	0–1	Holstein Kiel	Braunschweig
13:30 UTC+2		Report	Friðjónsson 90+2'	Stadium: Eintracht-Stadion; Attendance: 20,002; Referee: Arne Aarnink

5 August 2023 2	Holstein Kiel	2–1	Greuther Fürth	Kiel
13:00 UTC+2	Sterner 68'; Machino 71' (pen.)	Report	Hrgota 63'	Stadium: Holstein-Stadion; Attendance: 11,790; Referee: Tobias Reichel

20 August 2023 3	Holstein Kiel	2–4	1. FC Magdeburg	Kiel
13:30 UTC+2	Skrzybski 32'; Sander 50'; Holtby (yellow card) 90'	Report	Schuler 2'; Hugonet 21'; Castaignos 68'; Heber (yellow card) 79'; Arslan 90+1'; Lawrence (yellow card) 90+4'	Stadium: Holstein-Stadion; Attendance: 12,400; Referee: Nicolas Winter

25 August 2023 4	Schalke 04	0–2	Holstein Kiel	Gelsenkirchen
18:30 UTC+2	Ouwejan (yellow card) 17'; Schallenberg (red card) 39'	Report	Pichler 15'; Sander (yellow card) 43'; Machino 59'	Stadium: Veltins-Arena; Attendance: 60,403; Referee: Deniz Aytekin

2 September 2023 5	Holstein Kiel	2–1	SC Paderborn 07	Kiel
13:00 UTC+2	Rothe 31'; Skrzybski 61'	Report	Leipertz 12'	Stadium: Holstein-Stadion; Attendance: 11,454; Referee: Wolfgang Haslberger

17 September 2023 6	FC St. Pauli	5–1	Holstein Kiel	Hamburg
13:30 UTC+2	Metcalfe 4'; Smith 7'; Afolayan 38'; Ritzka 69'; Hartel 90+4'	Report	Holtby 50'	Stadium: Millerntor-Stadion; Attendance: 29,546; Referee: Bastian Dankert

24 September 2023 7	Holstein Kiel	2–3	Hertha BSC	Kiel
13:30 UTC+2	Pichler 54'; Skrzybski 57' (pen.)	Report	Prevljak 27'; Bouchalakis 39'; Reese 90+2' (pen.)	Stadium: Holstein-Stadion; Attendance: 15,034; Referee: Florian Badstübner

30 September 2023 8	Karlsruher SC	0–2	Holstein Kiel	Karlsruhe
13:00 UTC+2		Report	Pichler 24'; Rothe 27'	Stadium: Wildparkstadion; Attendance: 21,982; Referee: Patrick Alt

8 October 2023 9	Holstein Kiel	1–1	SV Elversberg	Kiel
13:30 UTC+2	Becker 44'	Report	Schnellbacher 70'	Stadium: Holstein-Stadion; Attendance: 12,675; Referee: Tobias Reichel

22 October 2023 10	Hansa Rostock	1–3	Holstein Kiel	Rostock
13:30 UTC+2	Kinsombi 18'	Report	Arp 33'; Remberg 56'; Becker 59'	Stadium: Ostseestadion; Attendance: 26,000; Referee: Richard Hempel

29 October 2023 11	Holstein Kiel	0–2	1. FC Nürnberg	Kiel
13:30 UTC+1		Report	Handwerker 68'; Uzun 77'	Stadium: Holstein-Stadion; Attendance: 12,801; Referee: Frank Willenborg

4 November 2023 12	VfL Osnabrück	1–1	Holstein Kiel	Osnabrück
13:00 UTC+1	Gnaase 55'	Report	Pichler 90+4'	Stadium: Stadion an der Bremer Brücke; Attendance: 15,456; Referee: Patrick Ittrich

11 November 2023 13	Holstein Kiel	4–2	Hamburger SV	Kiel
13:00 UTC+1	Skrzybski 20' (pen.); Pichler 57'; Porath 83'; Sterner 88'	Report	Glatzel 71', 80'	Stadium: Holstein-Stadion; Attendance: 15,034; Referee: Deniz Aytekin

26 November 2023 14	1. FC Kaiserslautern	0–3	Holstein Kiel	Kaiserslautern
13:30				Stadium: Fritz-Walter-Stadion

2 December 2023 15	Holstein Kiel	3–2	SV Wehen Wiesbaden	Kiel
13:00				Stadium: Holstein-Stadion

13 April 2024 29	Holstein Kiel	4–0	VfL Osnabrück	Kiel
13:00				Stadium: Holstein-Stadion; Referee: Max Burda

20 April 2024 30	Hamburger SV	0–1	Holstein Kiel	Hamburg
20:30 UTC+2	Meffert (yellow card) 67'	Report	Rothe 59'; Holtby (yellow card) 72' (yellow-red card) 73'	Stadium: Volksparkstadion; Referee: Sascha Stegemann

27 April 2024 31	Holstein Kiel	1–3	1. FC Kaiserslautern	Kiel
13:00		Report		Stadium: Holstein-Stadion; Referee: Florian Badstübner

5 May 2024 32	Wehen Wiesbaden	0–1	Holstein Kiel	Wiesbaden
13:30		Report		Stadium: Brita-Arena

11 May 2024 33	Holstein Kiel	1–1	Fortuna Düsseldorf	Kiel
20:30		Report		Stadium: Holstein-Stadion

19 May 2024 34	Hannover 96	v	Holstein Kiel	Hanover
15:30				Stadium: Heinz-von-Heiden-Arena

=== DFB-Pokal ===
12 August 2023 First round	FC Gütersloh	0–2	Holstein Kiel	Gütersloh
15:30 UTC+2		Report	Friðjónsson 72', 90+3'	Stadium: Heidewaldstadion; Referee: Patrick Kessel

1 November 2023 Second round	Holstein Kiel	3–3 (a.e.t.) (3–4 p)	1. FC Magdeburg	Kiel
18:00 UTC+1	Heber 61' (o.g.); Piccini 68' (o.g.); Pichler 120+2'	Report	Bockhorn 3'; Krempicki 11'; Amaechi 93'	Stadium: Holstein-Stadion; Attendance: 11,112; Referee: Tom Bauer
	Penalties
	Machino (penalty scored); Simakala (penalty missed); Kleine-Bekel (penalty scored); Rothe (penalty missed); Holtby (penalty scored)		(penalty scored) Conde; (penalty missed) Amaechi; (penalty scored) Bockhorn; (penalty scored) Gnaka; (penalty scored) Arslan
