= 2020–21 Holstein Kiel season =

Holstein Kiel
2020–21 season
- President: Steffen Schneekloth
- Head coach: Ole Werner
- Stadium: Holstein-Stadion
- 2. Bundesliga: 3rd
- DFB-Pokal: Semi-finals
- Top goalscorer: League: Alexander Mühling (12); All: Alexander Mühling (13)
Home colours	Away colours

The 2020–21 Holstein Kiel season was the club's 121st season in existence and the club's fourth consecutive season in the second flight of German football. In addition to the domestic league, Holstein Kiel participated in this season's edition of the DFB-Pokal. The season covered the period from 1 July 2020 to 30 June 2021.

== Players ==
=== First-team squad ===
As of 2 February 2021

Note: Flags indicate national team as defined under FIFA eligibility rules; some limited exceptions apply. Players may hold more than one non-FIFA nationality.

No.	Pos.	Nation	Player
1	GK	GRE	Ioannis Gelios
2	DF	DEN	Mikkel Kirkeskov
3	DF	GER	Marco Komenda
5	DF	GER	Stefan Thesker
6	MF	GER	Ahmet Arslan
7	MF	KOR	Lee Jae-sung
8	MF	GER	Alexander Mühling
11	FW	GER	Fabian Reese
15	DF	GER	Johannes van den Bergh
19	DF	GER	Simon Lorenz
20	DF	GER	Jannik Dehm
21	GK	GER	Thomas Dähne
22	DF	SRB	Aleksandar Ignjovski

No.	Pos.	Nation	Player
23	FW	GER	Janni Serra
24	DF	GER	Hauke Wahl (captain)
25	DF	GER	Phil Neumann
26	MF	GER	Jonas Meffert
27	FW	GER	Finn Porath
28	FW	GER	Noah Awuku
29	MF	GER	Joshua Mees
31	FW	GER	Fin Bartels
32	MF	GER	Jonas Sterner
33	FW	GER	Benjamin Girth
35	GK	GER	Dominik Reimann
36	MF	GER	Niklas Hauptmann (on loan from 1. FC Köln)

=== Out on loan ===
Note: Flags indicate national team as defined under FIFA eligibility rules; some limited exceptions apply. Players may hold more than one non-FIFA nationality.

No.	Pos.	Nation	Player
—	MF	GHA	David Atanga
—	FW	GER	Makana Baku (at Warta Poznan)
—	FW	GER	Daniel Hanslik (at 1. FC Kaiserslautern)

No.	Pos.	Nation	Player
—	FW	GER	Lion Lauberbach
—	MF	GER	Philipp Sander (at SC Verl)
—	GK	GER	Timon Weiner (at 1. FC Magdeburg)

== Transfers ==
=== In ===
Date	Pos	Player	From	Fee	Source
15 June 2020	MF	(Germany) Ahmet Arslan	VfB Lübeck	Free	
23 June 2020	DF	(Germany) Simon Lorenz	VfL Bochum	Free	
26 June 2020	DF	(Germany) Marco Komenda	SV Meppen	Free	
30 June 2020	GK	(Germany) Thomas Dähne	Wisła Płock	Free	

=== Loans in ===
Date from	Pos	Player	From	Date until	Source
1 July 2020	MF	(Germany) Niklas Hauptmann	1. FC Köln	1 July 2021	

=== Out ===
Date	Pos	Player	To	Fee	Source
24 April 2020	DF	(Germany) Dominik Schmidt		Released	
26 June 2020	DF	(South Korea) Seo Young-jae	Daejeon Hana Citizen	Released	
29 June 2020	FW	(Germany) Salih Özcan	1. FC Köln	Loan return	
29 June 2020	FW	(Germany) Emmanuel Iyoha	Fortuna Düsseldorf	Loan return	
29 June 2020	DF	(Bosnia and Herzegovina) Darko Todorović	Red Bull Salzburg	Loan return	
29 June 2020	FW	(Tunisia) Salim Khelifi	FC Zürich	Loan return	

=== Loans out ===
Date from	Pos	Player	Transferred to	Date until	Source
17 July 2020	GK	(Germany) Timon Weiner	1. FC Magdeburg	1 July 2022	

== Pre-season and friendlies ==
Win Draw Loss Fixtures

== Competitions ==
=== Overview ===
Competition	First match	Last match	Starting round	Final position	Record							
Competition	First match	Last match	Starting round	Final position	Pld	W	D	L	GF	GA	GD	Win %
2. Bundesliga	18 September 2020	23 May 2021	Matchday 1	3rd	34	18	8	8	57	35	+22	52.94
Bundesliga promotion play-offs	26 May 2021	29 May 2021	First leg	Runners-up	2	1	0	1	2	5	−3	50.00
DFB-Pokal	11 September 2020	1 May 2021	First round	Semi-finals	5	2	2	1	13	9	+4	40.00
Total					41	21	10	10	72	49	+23	51.22

Last updated: 29 May 2021
Source: Soccerway

=== 2. Bundesliga ===
==== League table ====
Pos	Team	Pld	W	D	L	GF	GA	GD	Pts	Qualification or relegation
1	VfL Bochum (C, P)	34	21	4	9	66	39	+27	67	Promotion to Bundesliga
2	Greuther Fürth (P)	34	18	10	6	69	44	+25	64	Promotion to Bundesliga
3	Holstein Kiel	34	18	8	8	57	35	+22	62	Qualification for promotion play-offs
4	Hamburger SV	34	16	10	8	71	44	+27	58	
5	Fortuna Düsseldorf	34	16	8	10	55	46	+9	56	

Source: DFB
Rules for classification: 1) Points; 2) Goal difference; 3) Goals scored; 4) Head-to-head points; 5) Head-to-head goal difference; 6) Head-to-head away goals scored; 7) Away goals scored; 8) Play-off.
(C) Champions; (P) Promoted

==== Results summary ====
Overall								Home						Away					
Pld	W	D	L	GF	GA	GD	Pts	W	D	L	GF	GA	GD	W	D	L	GF	GA	GD
34	18	8	8	57	35	+22	62	11	2	4	32	19	+13	7	6	4	25	16	+9

Last updated: 23 May 2021.

==== Results by round ====
Round	1	2	3	4	5	6	7	8	9	10	11	12	13	14	15	16	17	18	19	20	21	22	23	24	25	26	27	28	29	30	31	32	33	34
Ground	H	A	H	A	H	A	H	H	A	H	A	H	A	H	A	H	A	A	H	A	H	A	H	A	A	A	A	A	H	H	H	H	A	H
Result	W	D	W	W	L	D	D	D	W	W	W	W	W	L	D	L	W	D	W	W	W	L	W	D	L	L	W	D	W	W	W	W	L	L
Position	6	7	2	2	2	2	2	2	1	1	1	2	2	2	2	2	2	2	2	2	2	2	2	2	2	2	2	2	2	2	2	2	2	3

Updated to match(es) played on 23 May 2021. Source:
A = Away; H = Home; W = Win; D = Draw; L = Loss

==== Matches ====
The league fixtures were announced on 7 August 2020.

20 September 2020 1	Holstein Kiel	1–0	SC Paderborn	Kiel
13:30 CEST (UTC+2)	Mühling 59'	Report		Stadium: Holstein-Stadion; Attendance: 1,709; Referee: Bastian Dankert

26 September 2020 2	Eintracht Braunschweig	0–0	Holstein Kiel	Braunschweig
13:00 CEST (UTC+2)		Report		Stadium: Eintracht-Stadion; Attendance: 3,512; Referee: Martin Thomsen

4 October 2020 3	Holstein Kiel	2–1	Fortuna Düsseldorf	Kiel
13:30 CEST (UTC+2)	Hartherz 16' (o.g.); Mühling 86' (pen.)	Report	Meffert 59' (o.g.)	Stadium: Holstein-Stadion; Attendance: 1,973; Referee: Patrick Ittrich

18 October 2020 4	Würzburger Kickers	0–2	Holstein Kiel	Würzburg
13:30 CEST (UTC+2)		Report	Serra 22', 75'	Stadium: flyeralarm Arena; Attendance: 1,300; Referee: Matthias Jöllenbeck

24 October 2020 5	Holstein Kiel	1–3	SpVgg Greuther Fürth	Kiel
13:00 CEST (UTC+2)	Mühling 65'	Report	Seguin 7'; Hrgota 28'; Nielsen 58'	Stadium: Holstein-Stadion; Attendance: 2,239; Referee: Timo Gerach

31 October 2020 6	Erzgebirge Aue	1–1	Holstein Kiel	Aue
13:00 CET (UTC+1)	Krüger 2'	Report	Serra 9'	Stadium: Sparkassen-Erzgebirgsstadion; Attendance: 500; Referee: Florian Badstübner

9 November 2020 7	Holstein Kiel	1–1	Hamburger SV	Kiel
20:30 CET (UTC+1)	Bartels (yellow card) 74'; Mees 90+1'	Report	Heyer 43'	Stadium: Holstein-Stadion; Attendance: 0 Referee: Sören Storks

21 November 2020 8	Holstein Kiel	2–2	1. FC Heidenheim	Kiel
13:00 CET (UTC+1)	Wahl (yellow card) 8'; Mühling (yellow card) 33' (goal) 68' (pen.); Föhrenbach 45' (o.g.); Bartels (yellow card) 56'; van den Bergh (red card) 90+2'	Report	Kühlwetter (yellow card) 28' (goal) 87' (pen.) 90+4'	Stadium: Holstein-Stadion; Attendance: 0 Referee: Arne Aarnink

29 November 2020 9	Hannover 96	0–3	Holstein Kiel	Hanover
13:30 CET (UTC+1)	Başdaş (yellow card) 53'; Falette (yellow card) 71' (yellow-red card) 71'	Report	Reese (yellow card) 53'; Mühling 56' (pen.); Kaiser 57' (o.g.); Serra 60'	Stadium: HDI-Arena; Attendance: 0 Referee: Markus Schmidt

4 December 2020 10	Holstein Kiel	3–1	VfL Bochum	Kiel
18:30 CET (UTC+1)	Mühling 31' (pen.); Bartels 64'; Lee Jae-sung 65'	Report	Zoller 32'; Losilla (yellow card) 90+2'	Stadium: Holstein-Stadion; Attendance: 0 Referee: Robert Schröder

12 December 2020 11	Jahn Regensburg	2–3	Holstein Kiel	Regensburg
13:00 CET (UTC+1)	Vrenezi 17'; Stolze (yellow card) 33'; Wekesser (yellow card) 45'; Nachreiner (yellow card) 55'; Elvedi (yellow card) 86'; Beste 90+2'	Report	Ignjovski (yellow card) 1'; Lee Jae-sung 32' 37'; Mühling (yellow card) 34'; Bartels 66'	Stadium: Jahnstadion Regensburg; Attendance: 0 Referee: Robert Kampka

16 December 2020 12	Holstein Kiel	1–0	1. FC Nürnberg	Kiel
18:30 CET (UTC+1)	Bartels 80'			Stadium: Holstein-Stadion; Attendance: 0 Referee: Thorben Siewer

20 December 2020 13	SV Sandhausen	0–2	Holstein Kiel	Sandhausen
13:30 CET (UTC+1)	Behrens (yellow card) 49'; Contento (red card) 80'	Report	Mühling (yellow card) 26'; Dehm 70'; Serra 81' (pen.)	Stadium: BWT-Stadion am Hardtwald; Attendance: 0 Referee: Matthias Jöllenbeck

3 January 2021 14	Holstein Kiel	1–2	VfL Osnabrück	Kiel
13:30 CET (UTC+1)	Thesker (yellow card) 40'; Arslan 90+2'	Report	Schmidt 27'; Kerk 42'	Stadium: Holstein-Stadion; Attendance: 0 Referee: Harm Osmers

9 January 2021 15	FC St. Pauli	1–1	Holstein Kiel	Hamburg
13:00 CET (UTC+1)	Zalazar (yellow card) 6'; Marmoush 52'; Dźwigała (yellow card) 67'	Report	Van den Bergh (yellow card) 39'; Mees 62'	Stadium: Millerntor-Stadion; Attendance: 0 Referee: Frank Willenborg

17 January 2021 16	Holstein Kiel	2–3	Karlsruher SC	Kiel
13:30 CET (UTC+1)	Komenda (yellow card) 12'; Porath (yellow card) 34'; Serra 60', 77'; van den Bergh (yellow card) 87'; Hauptmann (yellow card) 89'	Report	Heise 6', (yellow card) 56'; Lorenz (yellow card) 19'; Thiede 45'; Bormuth 85'	Stadium: Holstein-Stadion; Attendance: 0 Referee: Lasse Koslowski

24 January 2021 17	Darmstadt 98	0–2	Holstein Kiel	Darmstadt
13:30 CET (UTC+1)	Rapp (yellow card) 34'; Pfeiffer (yellow card) 49'; Schnellhardt (yellow card) 78'; Dursun (yellow card) 79'; Kempe (yellow card) 84'	Report	Höhn 55' (o.g.)	Stadium: Merck-Stadion am Böllenfalltor; Attendance: 0 Referee: Aarne Aarnink

27 January 2021 18	SC Paderborn	1–1	Holstein Kiel	Paderborn
20:30 CET (UTC+1)	Führich 2'	Report	Komenda 15'	Stadium: Benteler-Arena; Attendance: 0 Referee: Patrick Ittrich

30 January 2021 19	Holstein Kiel	3–1	Eintracht Braunschweig	Kiel
13:00 CET (UTC+1)	Reese 4'; Bartels 28'; Serra 31'	Report	Ben Balla 63'	Stadium: Holstein-Stadion; Attendance: 0 Referee: Tobias Stieler

8 February 2021 20	Fortuna Düsseldorf	0–2	Holstein Kiel	Düsseldorf
20:30 CET (UTC+1)	Prib (yellow card) 40'; Danso (yellow card) 45'	Report	Mühling 36' (pen.); Lee Jae-sung 47'; Dehm (yellow card) 63'	Stadium: Merkur Spiel-Arena; Attendance: 0 Referee: Sören Storks

12 February 2021 21	Holstein Kiel	1–0	Würzburger Kickers	Kiel
18:30 CET (UTC+1)	Mühling 60' (pen.)	Report		Stadium: Holstein-Stadion; Attendance: 0 Referee: Thorben Siewer

22 February 2021 22	SpVgg Greuther Fürth	2–1	Holstein Kiel	Fürth
20:30 CET (UTC+1)	Nielsen 27'; Mühling 83' (o.g.)	Report	Mees 4'	Stadium: Sportpark Ronhof Thomas Sommer; Attendance: 0 Referee: Manuel Gräfe

27 February 2021 23	Holstein Kiel	1–0	Erzgebirge Aue	Kiel
13:00 CET (UTC+1)	Mühling 81' (pen.)	Report		Stadium: Holstein-Stadion; Attendance: 0 Referee: Martin Thomsen

8 March 2021 24	Hamburger SV	1–1	Holstein Kiel	Hamburg
20:30 CET (UTC+1)	Ambrosius (yellow card) 18'; Terodde 23'; Gayamerah (yellow card) 25'	Report	Lee Jae-sung 8'; Hauptmann (yellow card) 45'; Lorenz (yellow card) 61'	Stadium: Volksparkstadion; Attendance: 0 Referee: Tobias Reichel

3 April 2021 27	VfL Bochum	2–1	Holstein Kiel	Bochum
13:00 CEST (UTC+2)	Zoller 5', 60'	Report	Mühling 81' (pen.)	Stadium: Vonovia-Ruhrstadion; Attendance: 0 Referee: Martin Petersen

6 April 2021 25	1. FC Heidenheim	1–0	Holstein Kiel	Heidenheim
18:30 CEST (UTC+2)	Kleindienst 17'	Report		Stadium: Voith-Arena; Attendance: 0 Referee: Michael Bacher

24 April 2021 31	VfL Osnabrück	1–3	Holstein Kiel	Osnabrück
13:00 CEST (UTC+2)	Kerk 53'	Report	Serra 7'; Ajdini 23' (o.g.); Bartels 45'	Stadium: Stadion an der Bremer Brücke; Attendance: 0 Referee: Benjamin Cortus

27 April 2021 29	1. FC Nürnberg	1–1	Holstein Kiel	Nuremberg
18:30 CEST (UTC+2)	Borkowski 31'	Report	Serra 67'	Stadium: Max-Morlock-Stadion; Attendance: 0 Referee: Sören Storks

4 May 2021 30	Holstein Kiel	2–0	SV Sandhausen	Kiel
18:30 CEST (UTC+2)	Bartels 22'; Serra 69'	Report		Stadium: Holstein-Stadion; Attendance: 0 Referee: Tobias Stieler

7 May 2021 32	Holstein Kiel	4–0	FC St. Pauli	Kiel
18:30 CEST (UTC+2)	Arslan (yellow card) 13', (goal) 22'; Bartels 24', 49'; Lorenz (yellow card) 55'; Serra 67'	Report		Stadium: Holstein-Stadion; Attendance: 0 Referee: Frank Willenborg

10 May 2021 26	Holstein Kiel	1–0	Hannover 96	Kiel
18:00 CEST (UTC+2)	Bartels 44'	Report		Stadium: Holstein-Stadion; Attendance: 0 Referee: Manuel Gräfe
Note: The match was originally scheduled for 19 March 2021, but was postponed to 14 April 2021, because both teams were quarantined after players tested positive for COVID-19. It was postponed again because Holstein Kiel was quarantined again after more players tested positive for COVID-19.

13 May 2021 28	Holstein Kiel	3–2	Jahn Regensburg	Kiel
15:30 CEST (UTC+2)	Bartels 20'; Lorenz 79'; Mühling 83'	Report	Albers 16' (pen.); Vrenezi 75'	Stadium: Holstein-Stadion; Attendance: 0 Referee: Lasse Koslowski

16 May 2021 33	Karlsruher SC	3–2	Holstein Kiel	Karlsruhe
15:30 CEST (UTC+2)	Batmaz 52'; Hofmann 60', 76'	Report	Serra 41'; Mühling 84' (pen.)	Stadium: Wildparkstadion; Attendance: 0 Referee: Robert Hartmann

23 May 2021 34	Holstein Kiel	2–3	Darmstadt 98	Kiel
15:30 CEST (UTC+2)	Serra 18'; Bartels 87'	Report	Dursun 50', 58'; Höhn 75'	Stadium: Holstein-Stadion; Attendance: 0 Referee: Patrick Ittrich

==== Promotion play-offs ====
As a result of their third place finish in the regular season, the club qualified for the play-off match with the 16th-place team in the 2020–21 Bundesliga to determine whether the club would be promoted to the 2021–22 Bundesliga.

26 May 2021 First leg	1. FC Köln	0–1	Holstein Kiel	Cologne
18:30 CEST (UTC+2)	Katterbach (yellow card) 14'; Skhiri (yellow card) 51'; Wolf (yellow card) 53'; Czichos (yellow card) 90'	Report	Bartels (yellow card) 41'; Ignjovski (yellow card) 45'; Van den Bergh (yellow card) 46'; Lorenz 59'	Stadium: RheinEnergieStadion; Attendance: 0 Referee: Felix Zwayer

29 May 2021 Second leg	Holstein Kiel	1–5 (2–5 agg.)	1. FC Köln	Kiel
18:00 CEST (UTC+2)	Lee 4'; Porath (yellow card) 32'	Report	Hector 3'; Andersson 6', 13'; Bornauw (yellow card) 28'; Czichos 39'; J. Horn (yellow card) 44'; T. Horn (yellow card) 65'; Skhiri 84'; Thielmann (yellow card) 88'	Stadium: Holstein-Stadion; Attendance: 2,334; Referee: Deniz Aytekin

=== DFB-Pokal ===
13 September 2020 First round	1. FC Rielasingen-Arlen	1–7	Holstein Kiel	Kiel
15:30 CEST (UTC+2)	Niedermann 3'	Report	Wahl 15'; Serra 19'; Lee 22', 24'; Bartels 29'; Porath 63'; Reese 86'	Stadium: Holstein-Stadion; Attendance: 500; Referee: Christof Günsch

13 January 2021 Second round	Holstein Kiel	2–2 (a.e.t.) (6–5 p)	Bayern Munich	Kiel
20:45 CET (UTC+1)	Bartels 37'; Meffert (yellow card) 45+1'; Wahl 90+5'	Report	Gnabry 14'; Sané 48'; Süle (yellow card) 61'	Stadium: Holstein-Stadion; Attendance: 0 Referee: Robert Schröder
	Penalties
	Wahl (penalty scored); Arslan (penalty scored); Serra (penalty scored); Lee (penalty scored); Hauptmann (penalty scored); Bartels (penalty scored)		(penalty scored) Lewandowski; (penalty scored) Kimmich; (penalty scored) Müller; (penalty scored) Alaba; (penalty scored) Costa; (penalty missed) Roca

2 February 2021 Round of 16	Holstein Kiel	1–1 (a.e.t.) (7–6 p)	Darmstadt 98	Kiel
18:30 CET (UTC+1)	Serra 58'; Mühling (yellow card) 71'	Report	Skarke (yellow card) 79'; Mehlem (yellow card) 85'; Dursun 86'	Stadium: Holstein-Stadion; Attendance: 0 Referee: Sören Storks
	Penalties
	Wahl (penalty missed); Arslan (penalty scored); Serra (penalty scored); Porath (penalty scored); Lee (penalty scored); Bartels (penalty scored); Hauptmann (penalty missed); Kirkeskov (penalty scored); Lorenz (penalty scored)		(penalty missed) Mehlem; (penalty scored) Dursun; (penalty scored) Holland; (penalty scored) Mai; (penalty scored) Paik; (penalty scored) Höhn; (penalty missed) Honsak; (penalty scored) Rapp; (penalty missed) Skarke

3 March 2021 Quarter-finals	Rot-Weiss Essen	0–3	Holstein Kiel	Essen
18:30 CET (UTC+1)		Report	Mühling 26' (pen.); Serra 28'; Mees 90'	Stadium: Stadion Essen; Attendance: 0 Referee: Markus Schmidt

1 May 2021 Semi-finals	Borussia Dortmund	5–0	Holstein Kiel	Dortmund
20:45 CEST (UTC+2)	Reyna 16', 23'; Reus 26'; Hazard 32'; Bellingham 42'	Report	Hauptmann (yellow card) 37'; Lorenz (yellow card) 87'	Stadium: Signal Iduna Park; Attendance: 0 Referee: Christian Dingert

== Statistics ==
=== Appearances and goals ===
No.	Pos	Nat	Player	Total		2. Bundesliga		DFB-Pokal		Promotion play-offs	
No.	Pos	Nat	Player	Apps	Goals	Apps	Goals	Apps	Goals	Apps	Goals
Goalkeepers
1	GK	(Greece) GRE	Ioannis Gelios	29	0	24	0	3	0	2	0
21	GK	(Germany) GER	Thomas Dähne	12	0	10	0	2	0	0	0
35	GK	(Germany) GER	Dominik Reimann	0	0	0	0	0	0	0	0
Defenders
2	DF	(Denmark) DEN	Mikkel Kirkeskov	9	0	5+1	0	2	0	0+1	0
3	DF	(Germany) GER	Marco Komenda	19	1	9+4	1	2+2	0	2	0
5	DF	(Germany) GER	Stefan Thesker	14	0	12+1	0	1	0	0	0
15	DF	(Germany) GER	Johannes van den Bergh	28	0	25	0	1+1	0	1	0
19	DF	(Germany) GER	Simon Lorenz	23	2	13+4	1	4	0	1+1	1
20	DF	(Germany) GER	Jannik Dehm	24	1	12+7	1	4+1	0	0	0
22	DF	(Serbia) SRB	Aleksandar Ignjovski	12	0	5+5	0	1	0	1	0
24	DF	(Germany) GER	Hauke Wahl	41	2	34	0	5	2	2	0
25	DF	(Germany) GER	Phil Neumann	21	0	9+9	0	0+1	0	2	0
Midfielders
6	MF	(Germany) GER	Ahmet Arslan	18	2	2+13	2	0+3	0	0	0
7	MF	(South Korea) KOR	Lee Jae-sung	40	8	31+2	5	5	2	2	1
8	MF	(Germany) GER	Alexander Mühling	36	13	27+4	12	4	1	1	0
26	MF	(Germany) GER	Jonas Meffert	40	0	34	0	5	0	1	0
29	MF	(Germany) GER	Joshua Mees	34	4	9+20	3	1+2	1	0+2	0
32	MF	(Germany) GER	Jonas Sterner	0	0	0	0	0	0	0	0
36	MF	(Germany) GER	Niklas Hauptmann	37	0	15+16	0	1+4	0	1	0
Forwards
11	FW	(Germany) GER	Fabian Reese	39	3	26+6	2	3+2	1	1+1	0
23	FW	(Germany) GER	Janni Serra	37	16	25+6	13	4+1	3	1	0
27	FW	(Germany) GER	Finn Porath	40	1	5+28	0	2+3	1	2	0
28	FW	(Germany) GER	Noah Awuku	1	0	0	0	0	0	0+1	0
31	FW	(Germany) GER	Fin Bartels	38	13	29+2	11	5	2	2	0
33	FW	(Germany) GER	Benjamin Girth	20	0	1+16	0	0+1	0	0+2	0
Players transferred out during the season
18	FW	(Germany) GER	Lion Lauberbach	4	0	0+3	0	0+1	0	0	0

Last updated: 29 May 2021
Source: Competitions
