= 2021–22 Holstein Kiel season =

Holstein Kiel
2021–22 season
- Manager: Ole Werner
- Stadium: Holstein-Stadion
- 2. Bundesliga: 9th
- DFB-Pokal: Second round

The 2021–22 season was Holstein Kiel's 122nd season in existence and the club's fifth consecutive season in the 2. Bundesliga, the second tier of German football. The club also participated in the DFB-Pokal.

== Background ==
Kiel finished the 2020–21 season in 3rd place, qualifying for the promotion play-offs, but lost 5–2 to 1. FC Köln over two legs.

== Friendly matches ==
Kiel announced pre-season friendly matches against Randers FC on 2 July, Brøndby IF on 10 July, VfL Wolfsburg on 14 July and Hallescher FC on 17 July.

Friendly match details
Date	Time	Opponent	Venue	Result F–A	Scorers	Attendance	Ref.
2 July 2021	15:30	Randers FC	Home (Note: Match played at Citti-Fussball-Park in Kiel)	1–2	Mees 13'	0	
10 July 2021	13:00	Brøndby IF	Home	1–1	Komenda 66'		
14 July 2021	16:00	VfL Wolfsburg	Away	1–0	Mühling 60'	399	
17 July 2021	14:00	Hallescher FC	Away	2–2	Sterner 69', Mees 88'	2,000	
2 September 2021	13:00	Vejle BK	Home	1–2	Benger 74'		
7 October 2021	14:00	Silkeborg IF	Home	0–0	—	0	

== Competitions ==
=== 2. Bundesliga ===
==== League table ====
Pos	Team	Pld	W	D	L	GF	GA	GD	Pts
7	SC Paderborn	34	13	12	9	56	44	+12	51
8	1. FC Nürnberg	34	14	9	11	49	49	0	51
9	Holstein Kiel	34	12	9	13	46	54	−8	45
10	Fortuna Düsseldorf	34	11	11	12	45	42	+3	44
11	Hannover 96	34	11	9	14	35	49	−14	42

Source: DFB
Rules for classification: 1) Points; 2) Goal difference; 3) Goals scored; 4) Head-to-head points; 5) Head-to-head goal difference; 6) Head-to-head away goals scored; 7) Away goals scored; 8) Play-off.

==== Matches ====
2. Bundesliga match details
Match	Date	Time	Opponent	Venue	Result F–A	Scorers	Attendance	League position	Ref.
1	25 July 2021	13:30	FC St. Pauli	Away	0–3	—	8,900	17th	
2	1 August 2021	13:30	Schalke 04	Home	0–3	—	4,100	18th	
3	14 August 2021	13:30	Jahn Regensburg	Home	0–3	—	3,700	18th	
4	20 August 2021	18:30	Fortuna Düsseldorf	Away	2–2	Mühling 5', Skrzybski 65'	16,349	17th	
5	28 August 2021	13:30	Erzgebirge Aue	Home	3–0	Porath 29', Arp 37', Mees 81'	3,848	15th	
6	11 September 2021	13:30	Karlsruher SC	Away	2–2	Mees 78', Bartels 80'	10,000	15th	
7	18 September 2021	13:30	Hannover 96	Home	0–3	—	8,125	15th	
8	25 September 2021	13:30	SC Paderborn	Away	2–1	Porath 51', Mees 78'	6,656	14th	
9	2 October 2021	13:30	Hansa Rostock	Home	0–2	—	9,240	15th	
10	16 October 2021	13:30	FC Ingolstadt	Away	1–1	Pichler 14'	9,402	15th	
11	23 October 2021	13:30	Darmstadt 98	Home	1–1	Mühling 37' (pen.)	7,009	15th	
12	30 October 2021	20:30	Hamburger SV	Away	1–1	Pichler 46'	39,543	16th	
13	5 November 2021	18:30	Dynamo Dresden	Home	2–1	Pichler 65' (pen.), Reese 66'	8,919	13th	
14	21 November 2021	13:30	1. FC Heidenheim	Away	1–2	Bartels 30'	5,021	16th	
15	27 November 2021	20:30	Werder Bremen	Home	2–1	Mees 45', Pichler 65'	11,525	12th	
16	4 December 2021	13:30	1. FC Nürnberg	Away	1–2	Korb 88'	0 (Note: Match played behind closed doors due to COVID-19 pandemic.)	14th	
17	11 December 2021	13:30	SV Sandhausen	Home	2–2	Pichler 19', Skrzybski 83'	7,879	15th	
18	17 December 2021	18:30	FC St. Pauli	Home	3–0	Bartels 8', Porath 29', Pichler 45+1'	8,700	12th	
19	16 January 2022	13:30	Schalke 04	Away	1–1	Mühling 67'	750	13th	
20	23 January 2022	13:30	Jahn Regensburg	Away	2–1	Korb 35', Mühling 59' (pen.)	0	11th	
21	6 February 2022	13:30	Fortuna Düsseldorf	Home	1–0	Sterner 90+3'	0	10th	
22	11 February 2022	18:30	Erzgebirge Aue	Away	3–2	Bartels 19', Gonther 38' o.g., Wriedt 90+3'	4,788	10th	
23	19 February 2022	13:30	Karlsruher SC	Home	0–2	—	7,953	11th	
24	25 February 2022	18:30	Hannover 96	Away	0–2	—	9,200	11th	
25	4 March 2022	18:30	SC Paderborn	Home	3–4	Arp 23', Mühling 81' (pen.), Pichler 88'	9,174	11th	
26	11 March 2022	18:30	Hansa Rostock	Away	2–3	Mühling 50, Rizzuto 71' o.g.	21,250	13th	
27	20 March 2022	13:30	FC Ingolstadt	Home	1–0	Mühling 38' (pen.)	9,163	12th	
28	2 April 2022	13:30	Darmstadt 98	Away	1–3	Wriedt 49'	13,400	12th	
29	10 April 2022	13:30	Hamburger SV	Home	1–0				
30	16 April 2022	13:30	Dynamo Dresden	Away	0–0	—			
31	23 April 2022	13:30	1. FC Heidenheim	Home	1–1				
32	29 April 2022	18:30	Werder Bremen	Away	3–2				
33	8 May 2022	13:30	1. FC Nürnberg	Home	3–0				
34	15 May 2022	15:30	SV Sandhausen	Away	1–3				

=== DFB-Pokal ===
DFB-Pokal match details
Round	Date	Time	Opponent	Venue	Result F–A	Scorers	Attendance	Ref.
First round	7 August 2021	15:30	SC Weiche Flensburg 08	Away (Note: Match played at Manfred-Werner-Stadion in Flensburg.)	4–2 (a.e.t.)	Arp 94' (pen.), Sander 105', Reese 120', Bartels 120+4'	1,700	
Second round	26 October 2021	18:30	TSG Hoffenheim	Away	1–5	Neumann 47'	5,033	

== Transfers ==
=== Transfers in ===
Date	Position	Name	From	Fee	Ref.
1 July 2021	MF	Marcel Benger	Borussia Mönchengladbach	Free	
1 July 2021	MF	Julian Korb	—N/a	Free	
17 August 2021	MF	Lewis Holtby	Blackburn Rovers	Free	
30 August 2021	FW	Benedikt Pichler	Austria Wien		

=== Loans in ===
Date	Position	Name	Club	Return	Ref.

=== Transfers out ===
Date	Position	Name	To	Fee	Ref.
1 July 2021	DF	Jannik Dehm	Hannover 96	Released	
1 July 2021	FW	Benjamin Girth	Eintracht Braunschweig	Free	
1 July 2021	MF	Lee Jae-sung	Mainz 05	Released	
1 July 2021	MF	Jonas Meffert	Hamburger SV	€500,000	
1 July 2021	GK	Dominik Reimann	1. FC Magdeburg	Free	
1 July 2021	FW	Janni Serra	Arminia Bielefeld	Free	
13 July 2021	FW	Makana Baku	Göztepe		
6 August 2021	FW	David Atanga	KV Oostende		
22 August 2021	FW	Lion Lauberbach	Eintracht Braunschweig	Released	

=== Loans out ===
Date	Position	Name	Club	Return	Ref.
