= Johannes van den Bergh =

German footballer (born 1986)

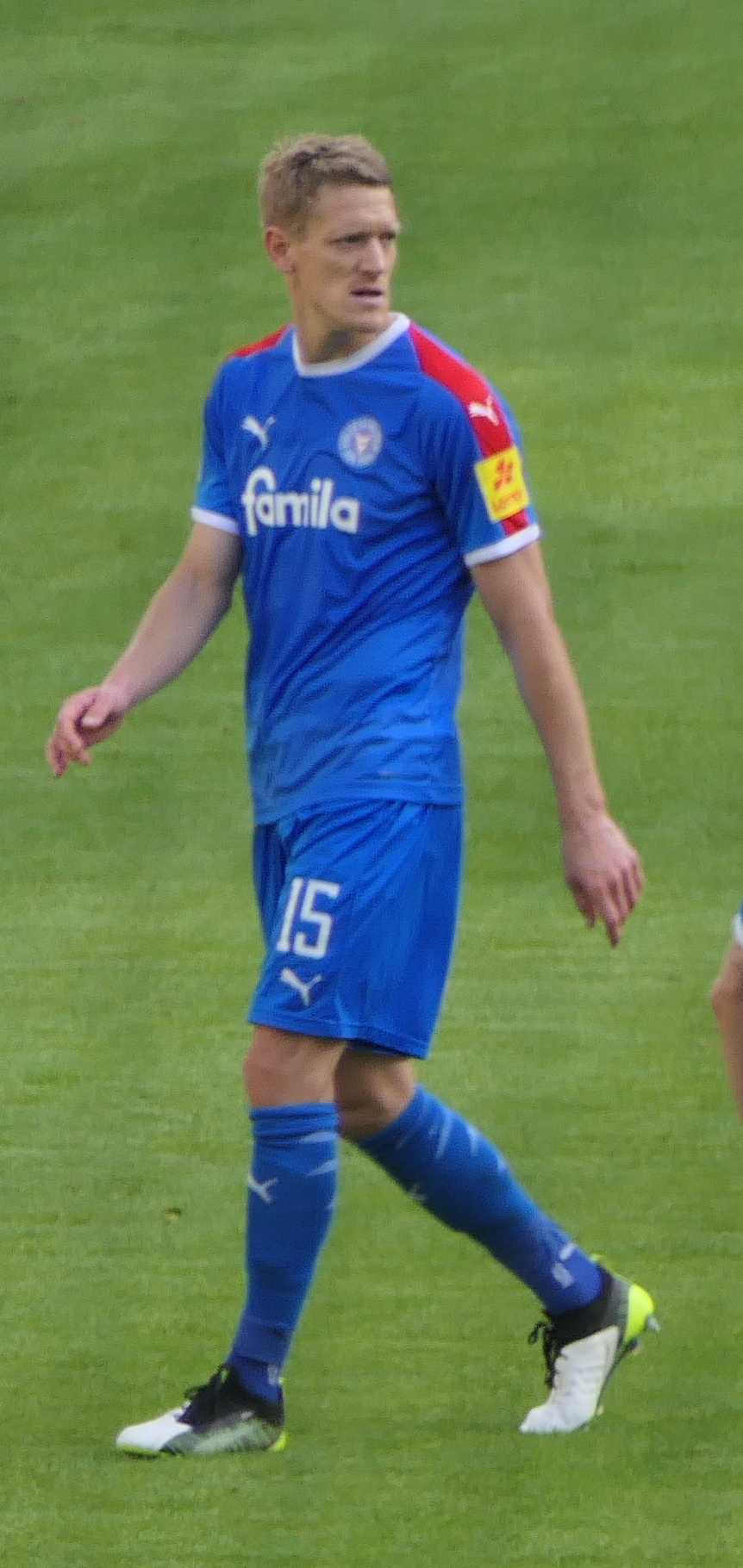
- Van den Bergh playing with Holstein Kiel in 2019

Personal information
- Date of birth: 21 November 1986 (age 39)
- Place of birth: Viersen, West Germany
- Height: 1.83 m (6 ft 0 in)
- Position: Left back

Youth career
- 1993–1996: SC Waldniel
- 1996–2001: Bayer Leverkusen
- 2001–2005: Borussia Mönchengladbach

Senior career*
Years	Team	Apps	(Gls)
2006–2009	Borussia Mönchengladbach II	48	(5)
2006–2009	Borussia Mönchengladbach	16	(1)
2009–2013	Fortuna Düsseldorf	124	(0)
2013–2016	Hertha BSC	45	(0)
2014–2016	Hertha BSC II	1	(0)
2016–2017	Getafe	5	(0)
2017	→ Greuther Fürth (loan)	10	(0)
2017–2022	Holstein Kiel	132	(0)
Total		381	(6)
- * Club domestic league appearances and goals

Johannes van den Bergh (born 21 November 1986) is a German former professional footballer who played as a left back.

== Career ==
Van den Bergh was born in Germany, and is of distant Dutch descent. He started his professional career with Borussia Mönchengladbach, making his first appearance on 16 September 2006 in the Bundesliga. He was substituted on in the 46th minute during a 2–4 defeat to Aachen. On 23 June 2009, Van den Bergh left Borussia Mönchengladbach and signed a three-year contract with Fortuna Düsseldorf. On 24 May 2013, Van den Bergh left Fortuna Düsseldorf and signed a three-year contract with Hertha BSC. In June 2016, he joined Spanish side Getafe.

On 30 January 2017, Van den Bergh returned to Germany on a six-month loan deal with Greuther Fürth. In August 2017, he moved to Holstein Kiel. On 17 December 2022, Van den Bergh and Holstein Kiel agreed to terminate his contract effective 31 December 2022.

Van den Bergh announced his retirement from playing in February 2023.

== Career statistics ==
As of matches played on 22 July 2021

Appearances and goals by club, season and competition
Club	Season	League			Cup		Other		Total		Ref.
Club	Season	Division	Apps	Goals	Apps	Goals	Apps	Goals	Apps	Goals	Ref.
Borussia Mönchengladbach	2006–07	Bundesliga	1	0	1	0	—		2	0	
Borussia Mönchengladbach	2007–08	2. Bundesliga	8	0	0	0	—		8	0	
Borussia Mönchengladbach	2008–09	Bundesliga	7	1	1	0	—		8	1	
Borussia Mönchengladbach	Total		16	1	2	0	—		18	1	—
Borussia Mönchengladbach II	2006–07	Regionalliga Nord	30	4	—		—		30	4	
Borussia Mönchengladbach II	2007–08	Oberliga Nordrhein	5	0	—		—		5	0	
Borussia Mönchengladbach II	2008–09	Regionalliga West	13	1	—		—		13	1	
Borussia Mönchengladbach II	Total		48	5	—				48	5	—
Fortuna Düsseldorf	2009–10	2. Bundesliga	31	0	1	0	—		32	0	
Fortuna Düsseldorf	2010–11	2. Bundesliga	33	0	1	0	—		34	0	
Fortuna Düsseldorf	2011–12	2. Bundesliga	27	0	3	0	2 (Note: Appearances in the promotion playoff)	0	32	0	
Fortuna Düsseldorf	2012–13	Bundesliga	33	0	3	0	—		36	0	
Fortuna Düsseldorf	Total		124	0	8	0	2	0	134	0	—
Hertha BSC	2013–14	Bundesliga	26	0	1	0	—		27	0	
Hertha BSC	2014–15	Bundesliga	6	0	0	0	—		6	0	
Hertha BSC	2015–16	Bundesliga	13	0	3	0	—		16	0	
Hertha BSC	Total		45	0	4	0	—		49	0	—
Hertha BSC II	2014–15	Regionalliga Nordost	1	0	—		—		1	0	
Getafe	2016–17	Segunda División	5	0	0	0	—		5	0	
Greuther Fürth (loan)	2016–17	2. Bundesliga	10	0	1	0	—		11	0	
Holstein Kiel	2017–18	2. Bundesliga	23	0	1	0	2	0	26	0	
Holstein Kiel	2018–19	2. Bundesliga	32	0	2	0	0	0	34	0	
Holstein Kiel	2019–20	2. Bundesliga	30	0	2	0	0	0	32	0	
Holstein Kiel	2020–21	2. Bundesliga	25	0	2	0	1	0	28	0	
Holstein Kiel	2021–22	2. Bundesliga	18	0	2	0	–		20	0	
Holstein Kiel	2022–23	2. Bundesliga	4	0	1	0	–		5	0	
Holstein Kiel	Total		132	0	10	0	3	0	145	0	—
Career total			381	6	25	0	5	0	411	6	—
