= Timon Weiner =

German footballer (born 1999)

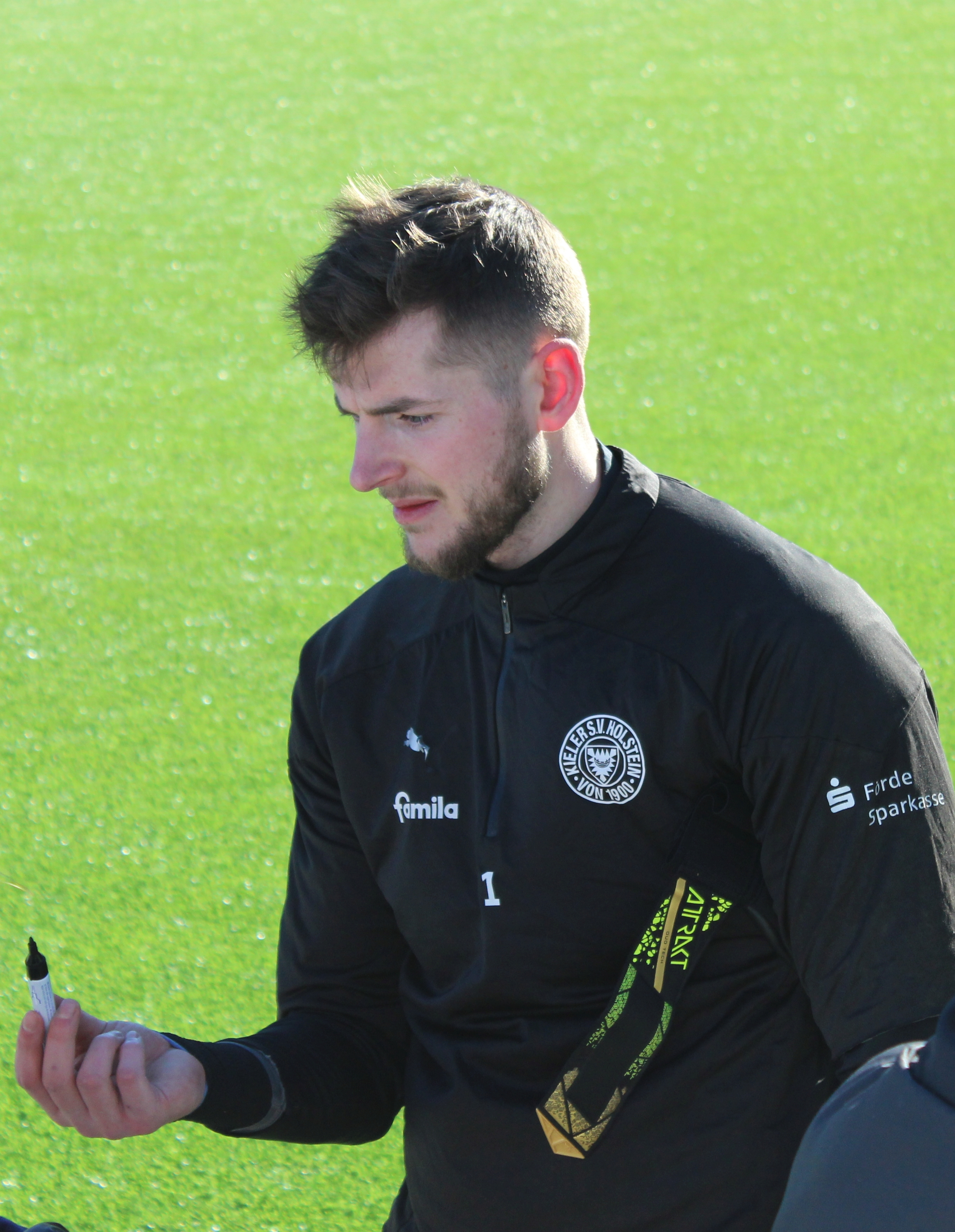
- Weiner with Holstein Kiel in 2025

Personal information
- Full name: Timon Moritz Weiner
- Date of birth: 18 January 1999 (age 27)
- Place of birth: Essen, Germany
- Height: 1.89 m (6 ft 2 in)
- Position: Goalkeeper

Team information
- Current team: Holstein Kiel
- Number: 1

Youth career
- 2003–2008: DJK TuS Essen-Holsterhausen
- 2008–2010: Rot-Weiss Essen
- 2010–2013: MSV Duisburg
- 2013–2018: Schalke 04

Senior career*
Years	Team	Apps	(Gls)
2018–2023	Holstein Kiel II	73	(0)
2021–	Holstein Kiel	68	(0)
2020–2021	→ 1. FC Magdeburg (loan)	0	(0)

International career
2013	Germany U15	1	(0)
2014	Germany U16	2	(0)
2015	Germany U17	1	(0)
2016–2017	Germany U18	2	(0)
2018	Germany U20	1	(0)
- * Club domestic league appearances and goals as of 18 May 2025

Timon Moritz Weiner (born 18 January 1999) is a German professional footballer who plays as a goalkeeper for 2. Bundesliga club Holstein Kiel. He is a former Germany youth international.

== Club career ==
=== Youth career ===
Weiner was born in Essen. From 2013 to 2018 he played for youth sides of Schalke 04. In the 2017–18 season he featured in the final of the Under 19 Bundesliga which Schalke 04 lost 3–1 against Hertha BSC.

=== Holstein Kiel ===
In summer 2018, having not been given a professional contract at Schalke 04, Weiner joined 2. Bundesliga club Holstein Kiel. At Holstein Kiel he was the first team's third- or fourth-choice goalkeeper and played for the club's reserves in the 2018–19, 2019–20, 2021–22 and 2022–23 seasons. He spent the 2020–21 season on loan at 1. FC Magdeburg in the 3. Liga without making an appearance.

Weiner made his debut in the 2. Bundesliga on the last matchday of the 2022–23 season, in a 5–1 win against Hannover 96. Following good performances in pre-season and in the DFB-Pokal and after first-choice keeper Thomas Dähne had made mistakes, Weiner played his second 2. Bundesliga match and his first of the 2023–24 season on 25 August 2023, against former club Schalke 04. Holstein Kiel won 2–0 at Schalke 04's stadium.

At the end of the 2024–25 season, Weiner lost his place as first-choice goalkeeper to Thomas Dähne. At the beginning of the following season, after Dähne had left the club, new signing Jonas Krumrey took over. Weiner returned to the starting place in late February 2026, upon the arrival of new manager Tim Walter.

== International career ==
Weiner represented Germany internationally at youth levels U15, U16, U17, U18, and U20.

== Career statistics ==
As of match played 3 December 2025

Appearances and goals by club, season and competition
Club	Season	League			DFB-Pokal		Total	
Club	Season	Division	Apps	Goals	Apps	Goals	Apps	Goals
Holstein Kiel II	2018–19	Regionalliga Nord	26	0	—		26	0
Holstein Kiel II	2019–20	Regionalliga Nord	20	0	—		20	0
Holstein Kiel II	2021–22	Regionalliga Nord	19	0	—		19	0
Holstein Kiel II	2022–23	Regionalliga Nord	8	0	—		8	0
Holstein Kiel II	Total		73	0	—		73	0
Holstein Kiel	2021–22	2. Bundesliga	0	0	0	0	0	0
Holstein Kiel	2022–23	2. Bundesliga	1	0	0	0	1	0
Holstein Kiel	2023–24	2. Bundesliga	30	0	2	0	32	0
Holstein Kiel	2024–25	Bundesliga	25	0	2	0	27	0
Holstein Kiel	2025–26	2. Bundesliga	0	0	3	0	3	0
Holstein Kiel	Total		56	0	7	0	63	0
Career total			129	0	7	0	136	0
