= Fin Bartels =

German footballer (born 1987)

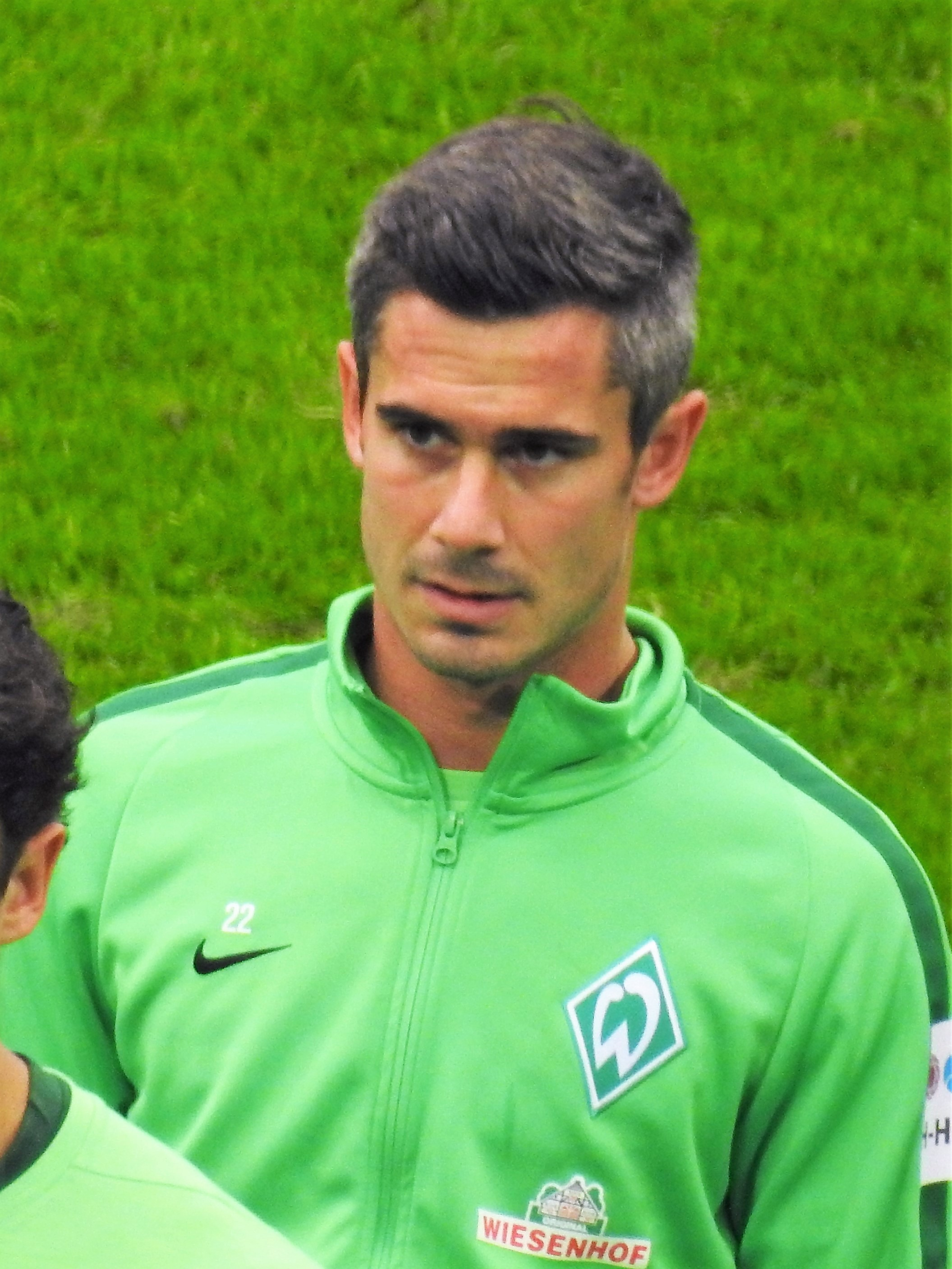
- Bartels training with Werder Bremen in 2017

Personal information
- Date of birth: 7 February 1987 (age 39)
- Place of birth: Kiel, West Germany
- Height: 1.75 m (5 ft 9 in)
- Positions: Midfielder; striker

Youth career
- TSV Russee
- –2002: SpVgg Eidertal Molfsee
- 2002–2005: Holstein Kiel

Senior career*
Years	Team	Apps	(Gls)
2005	Holstein Kiel II	10	(1)
2005–2007	Holstein Kiel	50	(5)
2007	Hansa Rostock II	8	(4)
2007–2010	Hansa Rostock	77	(14)
2010–2014	FC St. Pauli	117	(22)
2014–2020	Werder Bremen	120	(22)
2019	Werder Bremen II	2	(1)
2020–2023	Holstein Kiel	78	(20)
Total		462	(89)

International career
2008	Germany U21	1	(0)
- * Club domestic league appearances and goals

Fin Bartels (born 7 February 1987) is a German former professional footballer who played either as midfielder or as a striker.

== Club career ==
=== Early career ===
Bartels began his career at TSV Russee and later played for SpVgg Eidertal Molfsee before joining Holstein Kiel in 2002. In 2005 Bartels moved up to Holstein Kiel II. Later that year he broke into the first team squad at Kiel, before joining Hansa Rostock of the Bundesliga in 2007.

=== Rostock ===
Bartels made his debut for Rostock against VfL Wolfsburg in a 3–1 defeat. He then scored his first Bundesliga goal with a bicycle kick on 1 March 2008 against Arminia Bielefeld to tie the game late on.

=== St. Pauli ===
Bartels became an instant regular at FC St. Pauli, making 31 appearances in his debut season. His first start came on matchday 6, against Borussia Dortmund. However, the club was relegated from the Bundesliga having finished in last place. His strongest two seasons for St. Pauli were the 2012–13 season and 2013–14 season, in both of which he scored seven league goals in the 2. Bundesliga. In January 2014, he announced his decision to not renew his St. Pauli contract but to leave the club for Werder Bremen.

=== Werder Bremen ===
Bartels signed a three-year contract with Werder Bremen. In his first season he was able to command a regular place in the team from matchday 3 onwards and made 29 league appearances scoring four goals.

In the following 2015–16 season he played 30 matches taking his goal tally up to eight, mostly on the right of the midfield.

In July 2016, Bartels agreed to a contract extension, reportedly until 2019.

In December 2017, in a 2–1 win against Borussia Dortmund, Bartels tore his achilles tendon which required surgery. In March 2018, his contract was extended until 2020 after he and Werder Bremen decided to exercise such an option in his running contract.

On 1 March 2019, following a long time out of action with complications during the healing process, it was announced he would play in two matches for the club's reserves before he would return to the first team squad. He scored in his first match with the reserves, a 1–1 draw away to SC Weiche Flensburg 08 on 3 March. In March, he made two substitute appearances for the first team, in a 4–2 win against Schalke 04 on matchday 25, and in a 3–1 away win against Bayer Leverkusen. He missed the rest of the season due to a muscle injury with manager Florian Kohfeldt expecting him to return in time for pre-season preparation in the summer.

=== Holstein Kiel ===
On 5 August 2020, Bartels moved back to boyhood club Holstein Kiel, playing in the 2. Bundesliga, for a second spell. He signed a two-year contract. On 13 January 2021, he scored a goal and the winning penalty for Holstein Kiel as they knocked out defending champions Bayern Munich in the DFB-Pokal. Bartels agreed a one-year contract extension until 2023 with Holstein Kiel in February 2022.

Bartels retired from playing at the end of the 2022–23 season.

== Career statistics ==
=== Club ===
Appearances and goals by club, season and competition
Club	Season	League			DFB-Pokal		Europe		Other		Total	
Club	Season	Division	Apps	Goals	Apps	Goals	Apps	Goals	Apps	Goals	Apps	Goals
Holstein Kiel II	2005–06	Oberliga Nord	10	1	—		—		—		10	1
Holstein Kiel	2005–06	Regionalliga Nord	17	0	0	0	—		—		17	0
Holstein Kiel	2006–07	Regionalliga Nord	33	5	—		—		—		33	5
Holstein Kiel	Total		50	5	0	0	0	0	0	0	50	5
Hansa Rostock II	2007–08	Oberliga Nordost	8	4	—		—		—		8	4
Hansa Rostock	2007–08	Bundesliga	19	4	1	0	—		—		20	4
Hansa Rostock	2008–09	2. Bundesliga	28	6	2	0	—		—		30	6
Hansa Rostock	2009–10	2. Bundesliga	30	4	1	0	—		2 (Note: Appearances in 2. Bundesliga relegation playoffs)	0	33	4
Hansa Rostock	Total		77	14	4	0	0	0	2	0	83	14
FC St. Pauli	2010–11	Bundesliga	31	2	1	0	—		—		32	2
FC St. Pauli	2011–12	2. Bundesliga	32	6	1	0	—		—		33	6
FC St. Pauli	2012–13	2. Bundesliga	27	7	2	0	—		—		29	7
FC St. Pauli	2013–14	2. Bundesliga	27	7	1	0	—		—		28	7
FC St. Pauli	Total		117	22	5	0	0	0	0	0	122	22
Werder Bremen	2014–15	Bundesliga	29	4	3	1	—		—		32	5
Werder Bremen	2015–16	Bundesliga	30	8	4	1	—		—		34	9
Werder Bremen	2016–17	Bundesliga	31	8	1	0	—		—		32	8
Werder Bremen	2017–18	Bundesliga	14	2	0	0	—		—		14	2
Werder Bremen	2018–19	Bundesliga	2	0	0	0	—		—		2	0
Werder Bremen	2019–20	Bundesliga	14	0	1	0	—		2 (Note: Appearances in Bundesliga relegation playoffs)	0	17	0
Werder Bremen	Total		120	22	9	2	0	0	2	0	131	24
Werder Bremen II	2018–19	Regionalliga Nord	2	1	—		—		—		2	1
Holstein Kiel	2020–21	2. Bundesliga	31	11	5	2	—		—		36	13
Holstein Kiel	2021–22	2. Bundesliga	27	4	2	1	—		—		29	5
Holstein Kiel	2022–23	2. Bundesliga	20	5	0	0	—		—		20	5
Holstein Kiel	Total		78	20	7	3	0	0	0	0	85	23
Career total			462	89	25	5	0	0	4	0	487	94
