= Finn Porath =

German footballer (born 1997)

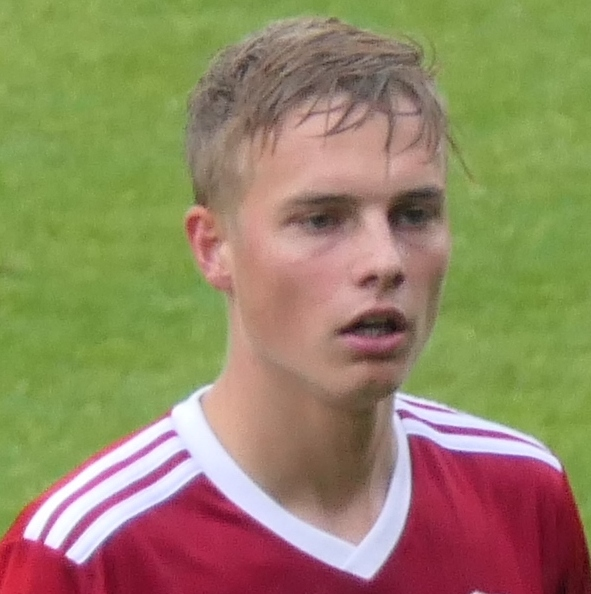
- Porath with SpVgg Unterhaching in 2018

Personal information
- Full name: Finn Dominik Porath
- Date of birth: 23 February 1997 (age 29)
- Place of birth: Eutin, Germany
- Height: 1.80 m (5 ft 11 in)
- Position: Midfielder

Team information
- Current team: Schalke 04
- Number: 27

Youth career
- 2005–2009: SF Herrnburg
- 2009–2010: VfB Lübeck
- 2010–2016: Hamburger SV

Senior career*
Years	Team	Apps	(Gls)
2015–2019	Hamburger SV II	25	(3)
2015–2019	Hamburger SV	1	(0)
2017–2019	→ SpVgg Unterhaching (loan)	60	(6)
2019–2025	Holstein Kiel	172	(13)
2025–	Schalke 04	18	(1)
2026–	Schalke 04 II	1	(0)

International career
2012–2013	Germany U16	9	(3)
2013–2014	Germany U17	12	(1)
- * Club domestic league appearances and goals as of 14 September 2026

Finn Dominik Porath (born 23 February 1997) is a German professional footballer who plays as a midfielder for Bundesliga club Schalke 04.

== Club career ==
On 21 August 2025, Porath signed a two-season contract with Schalke 04.

== Career statistics ==
As of match played 11 September 2026

Appearances and goals by club, season and competition
Club	Season	League			DFB-Pokal		Other		Total	
Club	Season	Division	Apps	Goals	Apps	Goals	Apps	Goals	Apps	Goals
Hamburger SV II	2015–16	Regionalliga Nord	1	0	—		—		1	0
Hamburger SV II	2016–17	Regionalliga Nord	22	2	—		—		22	2
Hamburger SV II	2017–18	Regionalliga Nord	2	1	—		—		2	1
Hamburger SV II	Total		25	3	—		—		25	3
Hamburger SV	2016–17	Bundesliga	1	0	0	0	—		1	0
SpVgg Unterhaching (loan)	2017–18	3. Liga	31	5	—		2 (Note: Appearances in Bavarian Cup)	0	33	5
SpVgg Unterhaching (loan)	2018–19	3. Liga	29	1	—		4	1	33	2
SpVgg Unterhaching (loan)	Total		60	6	—		6	1	66	7
Holstein Kiel	2019–20	2. Bundesliga	19	2	2	1	—		21	3
Holstein Kiel	2020–21	2. Bundesliga	33	0	5	1	2 (Note: Appearances in Bundesliga promotion play-offs)	0	40	1
Holstein Kiel	2021–22	2. Bundesliga	27	3	0	0	—		27	3
Holstein Kiel	2022–23	2. Bundesliga	33	2	1	0	—		34	2
Holstein Kiel	2023–24	2. Bundesliga	27	4	1	0	—		28	4
Holstein Kiel	2024–25	Bundesliga	31	2	2	0	—		33	2
Holstein Kiel	2025–26	2. Bundesliga	2	0	1	0	—		3	0
Holstein Kiel	Total		172	13	12	2	2	0	186	15
Schalke 04	2025–26	2. Bundesliga	18	1	1	0	—		19	1
Schalke 04	2026–27	Bundesliga	0	0	0	0	—		0	0
Schalke 04	Total		18	1	1	0	—		19	1
Schalke 04 II	2026–27	Regionalliga West	1	0	—		—		1	0
Career total			277	23	13	2	8	1	298	26

== Honours ==
Schalke 04

- 2. Bundesliga: 2025–26
