= Ahmet Arslan (footballer) =

German footballer

Personal information
- Date of birth: 30 March 1994 (age 32)
- Place of birth: Memmingen, Germany
- Height: 1.79 m (5 ft 10 in)
- Position: Midfielder

Team information
- Current team: Aliağa FK
- Number: 6

Youth career
- 1998–2001: TSV Ottobeuren
- 2001–2002: 1. FC Phönix Lübeck
- 2002–2008: Lübeck 1876
- 2008–2011: TSV Siems
- 2011–2013: VfB Lübeck

Senior career*
Years	Team	Apps	(Gls)
2013–2014	VfB Lübeck	2	(0)
2014–2016	Hamburger SV II	63	(33)
2015	→ Hamburger SV	1	(0)
2016–2018	VfL Osnabrück	49	(3)
2018–2020	VfB Lübeck	56	(31)
2020–2023	Holstein Kiel	22	(2)
2022	Holstein Kiel II	2	(3)
2022–2023	→ Dynamo Dresden (loan)	36	(25)
2023–2024	1. FC Magdeburg	9	(2)
2024	→ Dynamo Dresden (loan)	13	(0)
2024–2026	Rot-Weiss Essen	53	(18)
2026	Sydney FC	11	(1)
2026–	Aliağa FK	4	(2)
- * Club domestic league appearances and goals as of 1 October 2026

Ahmet Arslan (born 30 March 1994) is a German professional footballer who plays as a midfielder for TFF 2. Lig club Aliağa FK.

== Career ==
Arslan is a youth exponent from Hamburger SV. On 28 November 2015, he made his Bundesliga debut against Werder Bremen.

In June 2020, it was announced Arslan would join 2. Bundesliga side Holstein Kiel from arch rivals VfB Lübeck. He signed a contract until 2024.

In January 2024, Arslan returned to 3. Liga club Dynamo Dresden on loan until the end of the season, having previously had a very successful loan spell the previous season.

On 28 July 2024, Arslan signed with Rot-Weiss Essen. Arslan departed the club on 10 February 2026.

On 11 February 2026, Arslan was announced as a deadline day signing for Australian club Sydney FC for the remainder of the 2025–26 season, with an option to extend for an additional season. He made his debut three days later against Adelaide United at Allianz Stadium, coming off the bench in the 60th minute.

== Personal life ==
Arslan is of Turkish descent.

== Career statistics ==
As of match played 26 April 2026

Appearances and goals by club, season and competition
Club	Season	League			Cup		Continental		Total	
Club	Season	Division	Apps	Goals	Apps	Goals	Apps	Goals	Apps	Goals
Hamburger SV II	2014–15	Regionalliga Nord	16	19	0	0	—		16	19
Hamburger SV II	2015–16	Regionalliga Nord	12	13	0	0	—		12	13
Hamburger SV II	Total		28	32	0	0	0	0	28	32
Hamburger SV	2015–16	Bundesliga	1	0	0	0	—		1	0
VfL Osnabrück	2016–17	3. Liga	24	2	0	0	—		24	2
VfL Osnabrück	2017–18	3. Liga	26	1	2	1	—		28	3
VfL Osnabrück	Total		50	3	2	1	0	0	52	5
VfB Lübeck	2018–19	Regionalliga Nord	10	13	0	0	—		10	13
VfB Lübeck	2019–20	Regionalliga Nord	12	16	1	1	—		13	17
VfB Lübeck	Total		22	29	1	1	0	0	23	30
Holstein Kiel	2020–21	2. Bundesliga	15	2	3	0	—		18	2
Holstein Kiel	2021–22	2. Bundesliga	7	0	0	0	—		7	0
Holstein Kiel	Total		22	2	3	0	0	0	25	2
Holstein Kiel II	2021–22	Regionalliga Nord	2	3	0	0	—		2	3
Dynamo Dresden (loan)	2022–23	3. Liga	36	25	1	0	—		37	25
1. FC Magdeburg	2023–24	2. Bundesliga	9	2	3	0	—		12	2
Dynamo Dresden (loan)	2023–24	3. Liga	13	0	0	0	—		13	0
Rot-Weiss Essen	2024–25	3. Liga	34	14	1	0	—		35	14
Rot-Weiss Essen	2025–26	3. Liga	19	4	1	0	—		20	4
Rot-Weiss Essen	Total		53	18	2	0	0	0	55	18
Sydney FC	2025–26	A-League Men	11	1	0	0	—		11	1
Career total			247	115	12	2	0	0	259	118
