= Marco Komenda =

German footballer (born 1996)

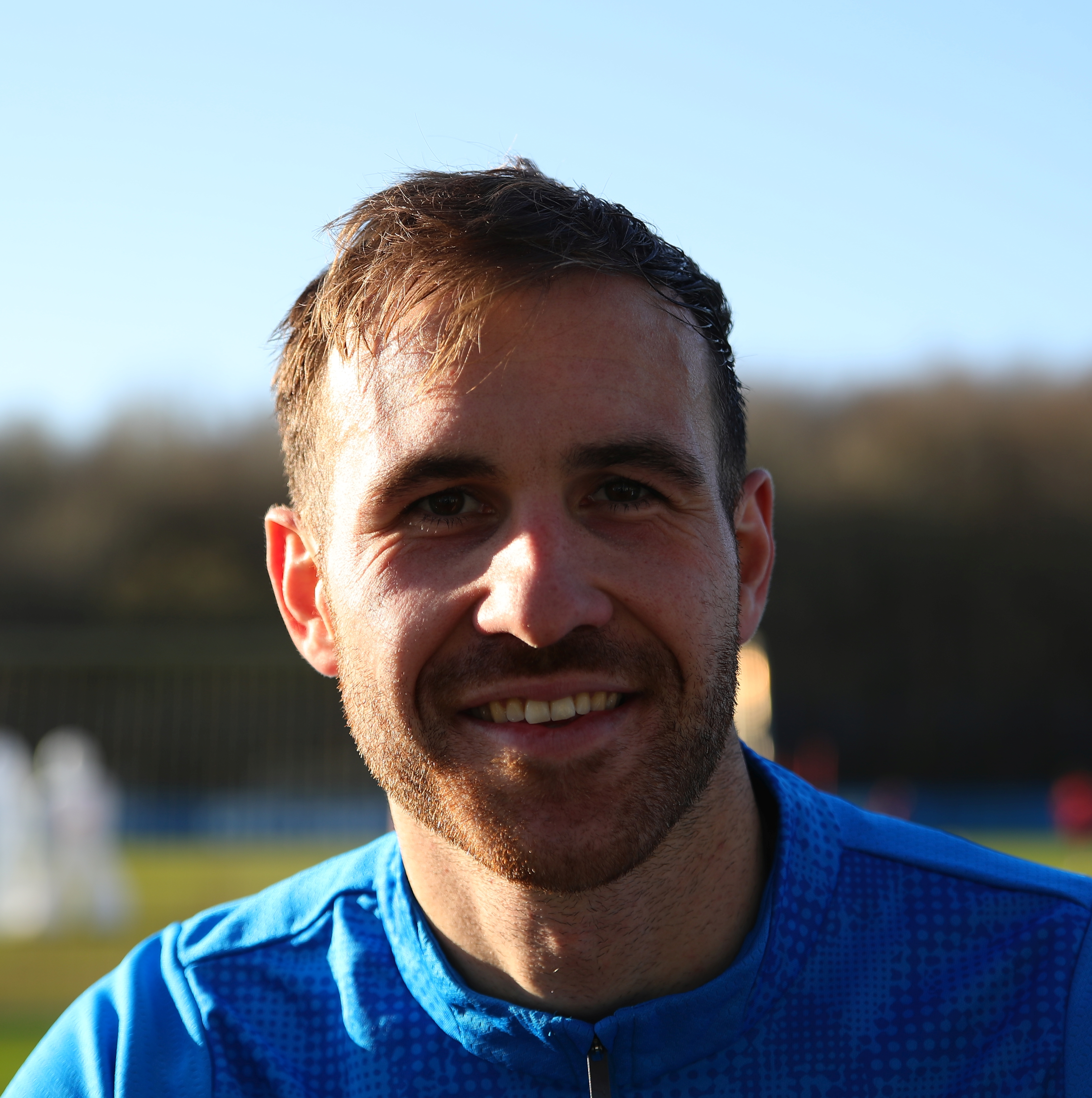
- Komenda in 2026

Personal information
- Date of birth: 26 November 1996 (age 29)
- Place of birth: Darmstadt, Germany
- Height: 1.84 m (6 ft 0 in)
- Position: Defender

Team information
- Current team: Arka Gdynia
- Number: 4

Youth career
- –2004: TSG Messel
- 2004–2015: Darmstadt 98

Senior career*
Years	Team	Apps	(Gls)
2015–2016	Sportfreunde Siegen	34	(3)
2016–2018	Borussia Mönchengladbach II	60	(2)
2018–2020	SV Meppen	64	(1)
2020–2026	Holstein Kiel	93	(3)
2023–2025	Holstein Kiel II	4	(0)
2026–	Arka Gdynia	0	(0)
- * Club domestic league appearances and goals as of 18 May 2026

Marco Komenda (born 26 November 1996) is a German professional footballer who plays as a defender for I liga club Arka Gdynia.

== Personal life ==
Born in Germany, Komenda is of Croatian descent.

== Career statistics ==
As of match played 2 May 2026

Appearances and goals by club, season and competition
Club	Season	League			National cup (Note: Includes DFB-Pokal)		Other		Total	
Club	Season	League	Apps	Goals	Apps	Goals	Apps	Goals	Apps	Goals
Borussia Mönchengladbach II	2016–17	Regionalliga West	31	0	—		—		31	0
Borussia Mönchengladbach II	2017–18	Regionalliga West	29	2	—		—		29	2
Borussia Mönchengladbach II	Total		60	2	—		—		60	2
SV Meppen	2018–19	3. Liga	34	1	—		—		34	1
SV Meppen	2019–20	3. Liga	30	0	—		—		30	0
SV Meppen	Total		64	1	—		—		64	1
Holstein Kiel	2020–21	2. Bundesliga	13	1	4	0	2 (Note: Appearances in 2. Bundesliga promotion play-offs)	0	19	1
Holstein Kiel	2021–22	2. Bundesliga	10	0	0	0	—		10	0
Holstein Kiel	2022–23	2. Bundesliga	11	2	1	0	—		12	2
Holstein Kiel	2023–24	2. Bundesliga	21	0	1	0	—		22	0
Holstein Kiel	2024–25	Bundesliga	19	0	1	0	—		20	0
Holstein Kiel	2025–26	2. Bundesliga	19	0	2	0	—		21	0
Holstein Kiel	Total		93	3	9	0	2	0	104	3
Holstein Kiel II	2022–23	Regionalliga Nord	2	0	—		—		2	0
Holstein Kiel II	2025–26	Oberliga Schleswig-Holstein	2	0	—		—		2	0
Holstein Kiel II	Total		4	0	—		—		4	0
Arka Gdynia	2026–27	I liga	0	0	0	0	—		0	0
Career total			221	6	9	0	2	0	232	6
