= Jonas Sterner =

German footballer (born 2002)

Personal information
- Date of birth: 13 May 2002 (age 24)
- Place of birth: Husum, Germany
- Height: 1.80 m (5 ft 11 in)
- Position: Midfielder

Team information
- Current team: Dynamo Dresden
- Number: 32

Youth career
- –2015: Rödemisser SV
- 2015–2016: TSV Hattstedt
- 2016–2020: Holstein Kiel

Senior career*
Years	Team	Apps	(Gls)
2020–2025	Holstein Kiel	36	(3)
2020–2025	Holstein Kiel II	42	(4)
2024–2025	→ Dynamo Dresden (loan)	32	(2)
2025–2026	Hannover 96	1	(0)
2025–2026	Hannover 96 II	4	(0)
2026	→ Dynamo Dresden (loan)	17	(0)
2026–	Dynamo Dresden	0	(0)

International career^{‡}
2018	Germany U16	5	(0)
2019	Germany U17	3	(0)
2019	Germany U18	1	(0)
- * Club domestic league appearances and goals as of 18 May 2026 ‡ National team caps and goals as of 09:30, 19 July 2022 (UTC)

Jonas Sterner (born 13 May 2002) is a German professional footballer who plays as a midfielder for 2. Bundesliga club Dynamo Dresden.

== Club career ==
On 27 August 2024, Sterner was loaned out by Dynamo Dresden in the 3. Liga. He joined 2. Bundesliga club Hannover 96 ahead of the 2025–26 season on a three-year contract. On 2 January 2026, he was loaned out to Dynamo Dresden again for the remainder of the season. On 24 June 2026, Dynamo Dresden made the transfer permanent.

== Career statistics ==
As of match played 21 December 2025

Appearances and goals by club, season and competition
Club	Season	League			Cup		Continental		Other		Total	
Club	Season	Division	Apps	Goals	Apps	Goals	Apps	Goals	Apps	Goals	Apps	Goals
Holstein Kiel	2019–20	2. Bundesliga	1	0	0	0	—		—		1	0
Holstein Kiel	2020–21	2. Bundesliga	0	0	0	0	—		0	0	0	0
Holstein Kiel	2021–22	2. Bundesliga	14	1	0	0	—		—		14	1
Holstein Kiel	2022–23	2. Bundesliga	5	0	0	0	—		—		5	0
Holstein Kiel	2023–24	2. Bundesliga	16	2	2	0	—		—		18	2
Holstein Kiel	Total		36	3	2	0	—		0	0	38	3
Holstein Kiel II	2020–21	Regionalliga Nord	3	1	—		—		—		3	1
Holstein Kiel II	2021–22	Regionalliga Nord	6	0	—		—		—		6	0
Holstein Kiel II	2022–23	Regionalliga Nord	24	3	—		—		—		24	3
Holstein Kiel II	2023–24	Regionalliga Nord	7	0	—		—		—		7	0
Holstein Kiel II	2024–25	Regionalliga Nord	1	0	—		—		—		1	0
Holstein Kiel II	Total		42	4	—		—		—		42	4
Dynamo Dresden (loan)	2024–25	3. Liga	32	2	1	0	—		—		33	2
Hannover 96	2025–26	2. Bundesliga	1	0	0	0	—		—		1	0
Hannover 96 II	2025–26	Regionalliga Nord	4	0	—		—		—		4	0
Dynamo Dresden (loan)	2025–26	2. Bundesliga	0	0	0	0	—		—		0	0
Career total			115	9	3	0	—		0	0	118	9
