= Thomas Dähne =

German footballer

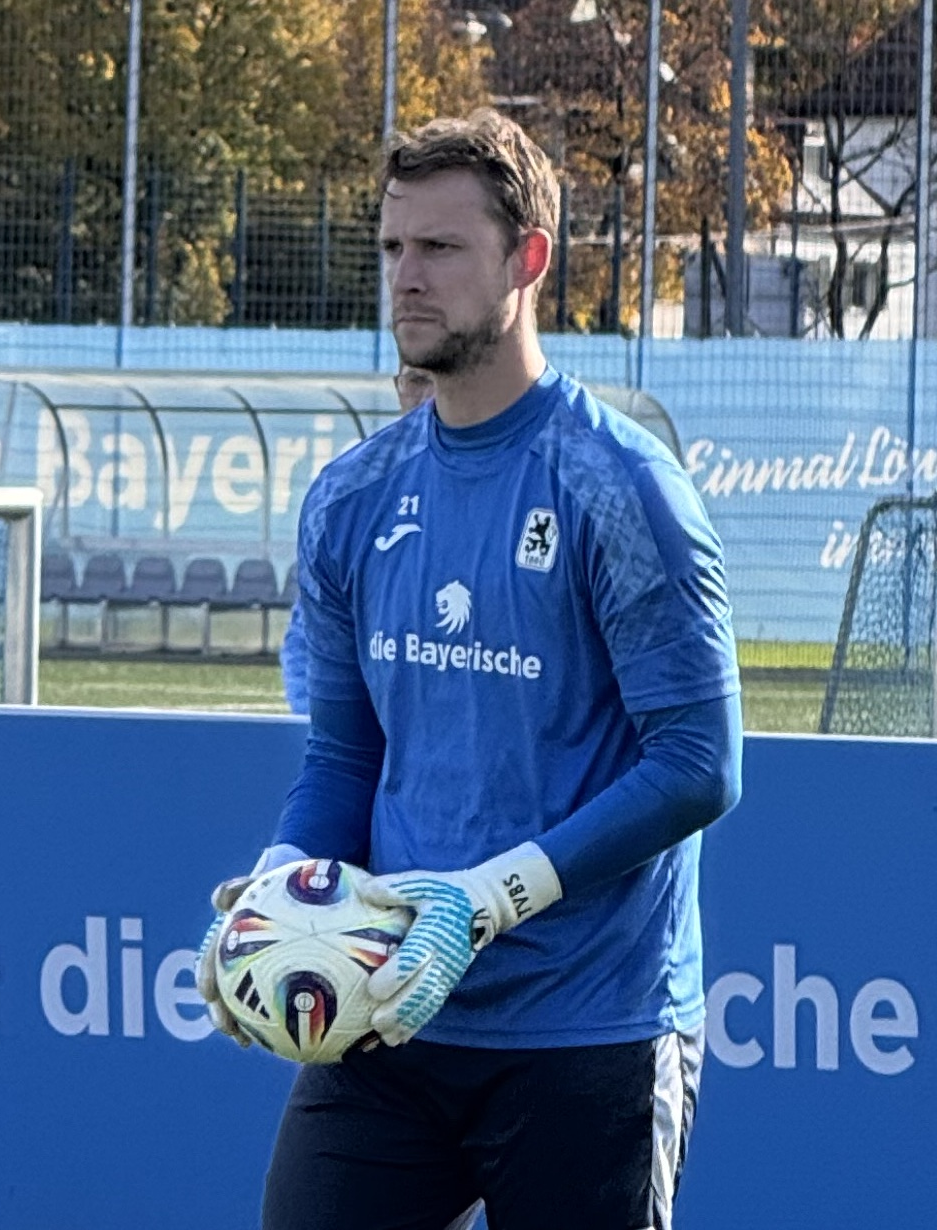
- Dähne training with 1860 Munich in 2025

Personal information
- Date of birth: 4 January 1994 (age 32)
- Place of birth: Oberaudorf, Germany
- Height: 1.93 m (6 ft 4 in)
- Position: Goalkeeper

Team information
- Current team: 1. FC Heidenheim
- Number: 33

Youth career
- 2000–2005: FV Oberaudorf
- 2005–2007: TSV 1860 Rosenheim
- 2007–2010: Red Bull Salzburg

Senior career*
Years	Team	Apps	(Gls)
2010–2012	Red Bull Salzburg II	8	(0)
2012–2013	Red Bull Salzburg	1	(0)
2012–2014	FC Liefering	53	(0)
2014–2015	RB Leipzig II	12	(0)
2014–2015	RB Leipzig	0	(0)
2015–2017	HJK	56	(0)
2018–2020	Wisła Płock	71	(0)
2020–2025	Holstein Kiel	60	(0)
2023	Holstein Kiel II	3	(0)
2025–2026	1860 Munich	35	(0)
2026–	1. FC Heidenheim	4	(0)

International career
2009	Germany U16	2	(0)
2010–2011	Germany U17	3	(0)
2011–2012	Germany U18	4	(0)
2012	Germany U19	3	(0)
2013–2014	Germany U20	4	(0)
- * Club domestic league appearances and goals as of 20 September 2026

Thomas Dähne (born 4 January 1994) is a German professional footballer who plays as a goalkeeper for 2. Bundesliga club 1. FC Heidenheim.

== Club career ==
Dähne joined the youth set-up of Red Bull Salzburg from TSV 1860 Rosenheim, and he advanced through the club's youth system, making his debut for the second team as a stand in for first-choice goalkeeper Niclas Heimann in a 5–0 win against TSV St. Johann in Regional League West on 29 April 2010. Dähne established himself in the first team of FC Liefering—Red Bull's feeder team—during the 2012–13 season, which he finished by making his Austrian Football Bundesliga debut for Red Bull Salzburg in a 3–0 win against Austria Wien on 26 May 2013.

On 10 August 2015, Dähne joined Veikkausliiga club HJK Helsinki for the remainder of the season. In October of the same year, HJK asserted their option of keeping him under contract for the 2016 season.

On 23 November 2017, he signed a two-and-a-half-year deal with Wisła Płock.

Since 2020, Dähne has played for Holstein Kiel in 2. Bundesliga. The club won the promotion to Bundesliga for the 2024–25 season, and Dähne made his Bundesliga debut on 16 February 2025, in a match against Eintracht Frankfurt.

In June 2025, Dähne signed with 1860 Munich in 3. Liga.

On 15 July 2026, Dähne moved to 1. FC Heidenheim in 2. Bundesliga on a two-year contract.

== International career ==
Dähne has represented Germany at every level up to under-20, and he was a member of the German squad at the 2011 FIFA U-17 World Cup.

== Career statistics ==
As of 20 September 2026

Appearances and goals by club, season and competition
Club	Season	League			National cup (Note: Includes Finnish Cup, DFB-Pokal)		Europe		Other		Total	
Club	Season	Division	Apps	Goals	Apps	Goals	Apps	Goals	Apps	Goals	Apps	Goals
Red Bull Salzburg II	2010–11	Austrian Regionalliga	3	0	0	0	—		—		3	0
Red Bull Salzburg II	2011–12	Austrian Regionalliga	5	0	0	0	—		—		5	0
Red Bull Salzburg II	Total		8	0	0	0	—		—		8	0
Red Bull Salzburg	2012–13	Austrian Bundesliga	1	0	0	0	0	0	—		1	0
FC Liefering	2012–13	Austrian Regionalliga	23	0	—		—		2	0	25	0
FC Liefering	2013–14	Austrian Football First League	30	0	—		—		—		30	0
FC Liefering	Total		53	0	—		—		2	0	55	0
RB Leipzig II	2014–15	NOFV-Oberliga	12	0	—		—		—		12	0
RB Leipzig	2014–15	2. Bundesliga	0	0	0	0	—		—		0	0
HJK	2015	Veikkausliiga	6	0	1	0	1 (Note: Appearances in UEFA Europa League)	0	—		8	0
HJK	2016	Veikkausliiga	28	0	2	0	6	0	2 (Note: Appearances in Finnish League Cup)	0	38	0
HJK	2017	Veikkausliiga	22	0	5	0	3	0	—		30	0
HJK	Total		56	0	8	0	10	0	2	0	76	0
Wisła Płock	2017–18	Ekstraklasa	16	0	—		—		—		16	0
Wisła Płock	2018–19	Ekstraklasa	30	0	0	0	—		—		30	0
Wisła Płock	2019–20	Ekstraklasa	25	0	0	0	—		—		25	0
Wisła Płock	Total		71	0	0	0	—		—		71	0
Holstein Kiel	2020–21	2. Bundesliga	10	0	0	0	—		0	0	10	0
Holstein Kiel	2021–22	2. Bundesliga	23	0	1	0	—		—		24	0
Holstein Kiel	2022–23	2. Bundesliga	15	0	0	0	—		—		15	0
Holstein Kiel	2023–24	2. Bundesliga	3	0	0	0	—		—		3	0
Holstein Kiel	2024–25	Bundesliga	9	0	0	0	—		—		9	0
Holstein Kiel	Total		60	0	1	0	—		0	0	61	0
1860 Munich	2025–26	3. Liga	35	0	—		—		4 (Note: Appearances in Bavarian Cup)	0	39	0
1. FC Heidenheim	2026–27	2. Bundesliga	4	0	0	0	—		—		4	0
Career total			300	0	9	0	10	0	8	0	327	0

== Honors ==
FC Liefering

- Regionalliga West: 2012–13

HJK

- Veikkausliiga: 2017
- Finnish Cup: 2016–17
