= Benedikt Pichler =

Austrian footballer (born 1997)

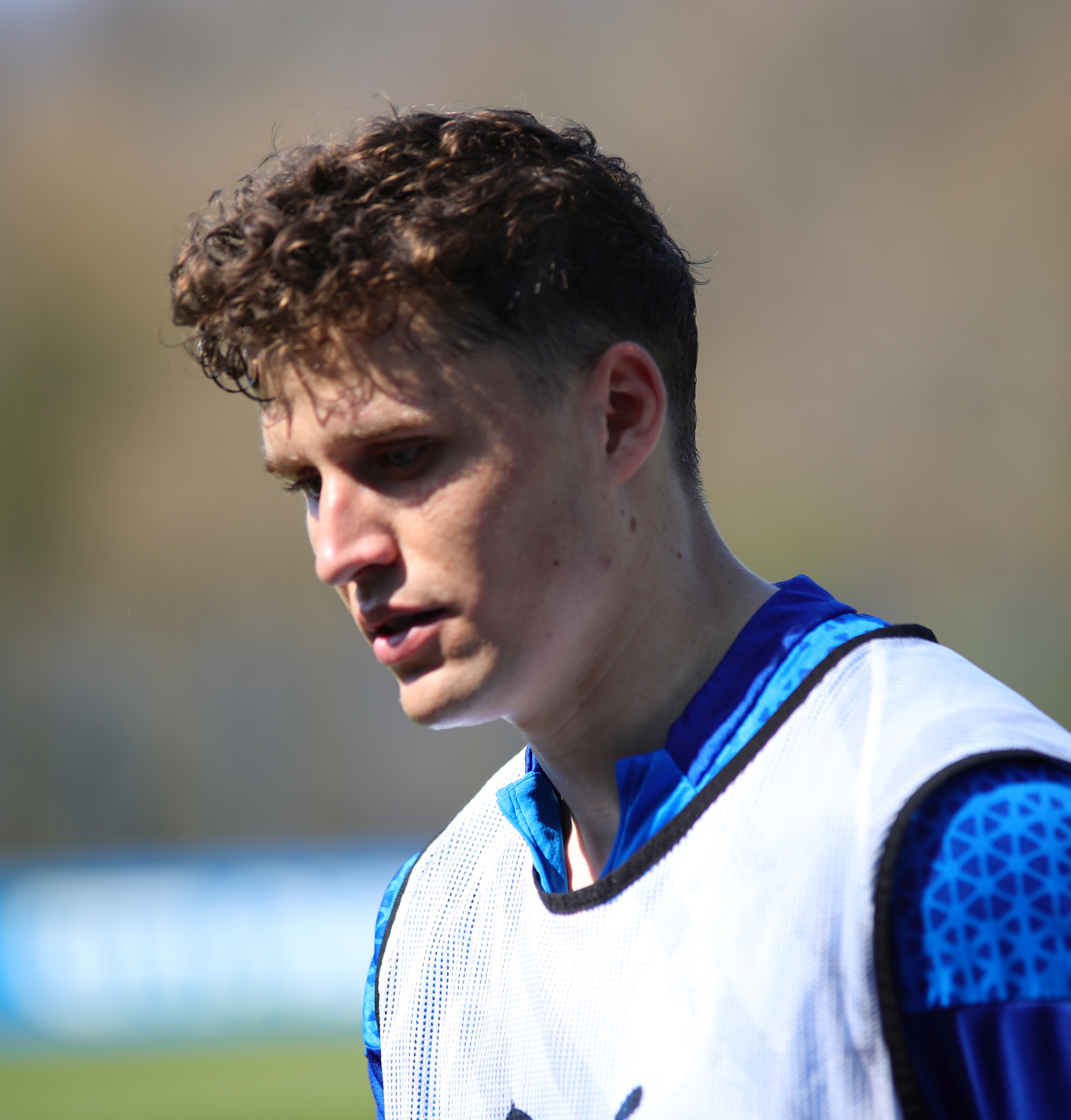
- Pichler with Holstein Kiel in 2025

Personal information
- Date of birth: 20 July 1997 (age 29)
- Place of birth: Salzburg, Austria
- Height: 1.87 m (6 ft 2 in)
- Position: Forward

Team information
- Current team: Hannover 96
- Number: 11

Youth career
- 2006–2010: USK Gneiss
- 2010–2014: USK Anif

Senior career*
Years	Team	Apps	(Gls)
2014–2016	Grödig II	40	(13)
2016–2018	Grödig	49	(15)
2018–2019	Austria Klagenfurt	22	(8)
2019–2021	Austria Wien	49	(13)
2019–2021	Austria Wien II	12	(5)
2021–2025	Holstein Kiel	77	(19)
2023–2025	Holstein Kiel II	3	(1)
2025–	Hannover 96	19	(3)
- * Club domestic league appearances and goals as of 18 May 2026

Benedikt Pichler (born 20 July 1997) is an Austrian professional footballer who plays as a forward for 2. Bundesliga club Hannover 96.

== Career ==
Pichler was born in Salzburg, Austria, and began his youth career with local club USK Gneiss. In 2010, he joined the academy of the USK Anif. Ahead of the 2014–15 season, he moved to the amateurs of Grödig, making his debut in the Salzburger Liga in August 2014, when he was substituted for Marinko Sorda in the 58th minute on the first matchday of that season against his former side USK Anif. In the same month, he scored his first goal in the fourth division in a 4–2 victory against the Salzburger AK 1914.

In July 2016, he made his debut for Grödig's first team in the Austrian Regionalliga when he came off the bench at half-time for Julian Feiser on the first matchday of the 2016–17 season against FC Kufstein. Pichler scored his first goal in the Regionalliga in September 2016 in a 2–0 win against TSV St. Johann im Pongau.

For the 2018–19 season, he moved to the 2. Liga club Austria Klagenfurt. He made his competitive debut in July 2018, when he was in the starting eleven on the first matchday of the season against Austria Lustenau.

For the 2019–20 season, he moved to the Austrian Bundesliga club Austria Wien, where he signed a four-year contract. In two years with the Viennese, he made 43 Bundesliga appearances, in which he scored eleven goals.

Pichler moved to 2. Bundesliga club Holstein Kiel from in August 2021, having agreed a four-year contract. On 11 May 2024, he scored a goal in a 1–1 draw against Fortuna Düsseldorf, securing his club's promotion to the Bundesliga for the first time in their history.

On 16 June 2025 Pichler signed a two-year contract with 2. Bundesliga side Hannover 96.

== Career statistics ==
As of match played 10 May 2025

Appearances and goals by club, season and competition
Club	Season	League			Cup		Europe		Other		Total	
Club	Season	Division	Apps	Goals	Apps	Goals	Apps	Goals	Apps	Goals	Apps	Goals
Grödig II	2014–15	Salzburger Liga	11	3	–		–		–		11	3
Grödig II	2015–16	Salzburger Liga	29	10	–		–		–		29	10
Grödig II	Total		40	13	–		–		–		40	13
Grödig	2016–17	Austrian Regionalliga West	23	5	4	0	–		–		27	5
Grödig	2017–18	Austrian Regionalliga West	26	10	1	0	–		–		27	10
Grödig	Total		49	15	5	0	–		–		54	15
Austria Klagenfurt	2018–19	2. Liga	22	8	1	1	–		–		23	9
Austria Wien	2019–20	Austrian Bundesliga	19	5	0	0	1 (Note: Appearance in UEFA Europa League)	0	0	0	20	5
Austria Wien	2020–21	Austrian Bundesliga	25	7	4	2	0	0	0	0	29	9
Austria Wien	2021–22	Austrian Bundesliga	5	1	1	0	2 (Note: Appearances in UEFA Conference League)	0	0	0	8	1
Austria Wien	Total		49	13	5	2	3	0	0	0	57	15
Austria Wien II	2019–20	2. Liga	12	5	–		–		–		12	5
Holstein Kiel	2021–22	2. Bundesliga	26	7	1	0	–		–		27	7
Holstein Kiel	2022–23	2. Bundesliga	11	3	1	0	–		–		12	3
Holstein Kiel	2023–24	2. Bundesliga	22	8	2	1	–		–		24	9
Holstein Kiel	2024–25	Bundesliga	18	1	2	0	–		–		20	1
Holstein Kiel	Total		77	19	6	1	–		–		83	20
Holstein Kiel II	2022–23	Regionalliga Nord	1	0	–		–		–		1	0
Holstein Kiel II	2023–24	Regionalliga Nord	1	0	–		–		–		1	0
Holstein Kiel II	2024–25	Regionalliga Nord	1	1	–		–		–		1	1
Holstein Kiel II	Total		3	1	–		–		–		3	1
Hannover 96	2025–26	2. Bundesliga	0	0	0	0	—		—		0	0
Career total			252	74	17	4	3	0	0	0	272	78
