= Lucas Wolf (footballer) =

German footballer (born 2001)

Personal information
- Full name: Lucas Mika Wolf
- Date of birth: 28 August 2001 (age 25)
- Place of birth: Eckernförde, Germany
- Height: 1.73 m (5 ft 8 in)
- Position: Midfielder

Team information
- Current team: Viktoria Köln
- Number: 21

Youth career
- –2018: Gettorfer SC
- 2018–2020: Holstein Kiel

Senior career*
Years	Team	Apps	(Gls)
2020–2021	VfB Lübeck	11	(0)
2020	VfB Lübeck II	1	(1)
2021–2024	Holstein Kiel II	82	(5)
2021–2024	Holstein Kiel	2	(0)
2024–2025	SV Sandhausen	23	(3)
2025–	Viktoria Köln	32	(2)
- * Club domestic league appearances and goals as of 29 May 2026

Lucas Mika Wolf (born 28 August 2001) is a German professional footballer who plays as a midfielder for 3. Liga club Viktoria Köln.

== Career ==
Wolf made his senior debut with VfB Lübeck as a substitute in a 1–1 draw at home to 1. FC Saarbrücken on 19 September 2020.

In May 2022, he made his 2. Bundesliga with Holstein Kiel in a 3–0 win against 1. FC Nürnberg. Also in May he signed his first professional contract which tied him to the club until June 2024.

On 3 June 2024, Wolf agreed to join 3. Liga club SV Sandhausen.

On 27 May 2025, Wolf signed with Viktoria Köln.
