= Fabian Reese =

German footballer (born 1997)

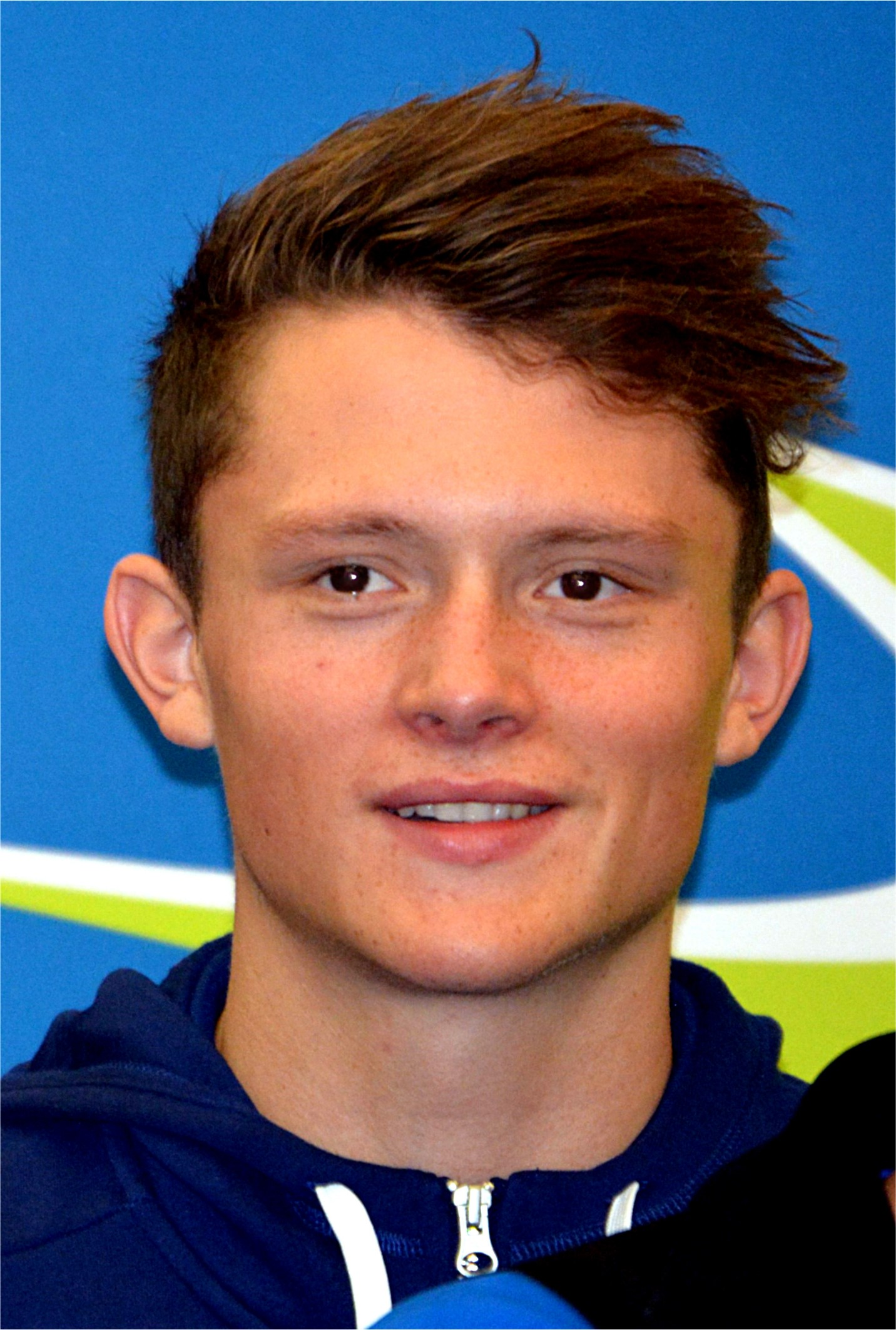
- Reese in 2016

Personal information
- Date of birth: 29 November 1997 (age 28)
- Place of birth: Kiel, Germany
- Height: 1.87 m (6 ft 2 in)
- Positions: Winger; striker

Team information
- Current team: VfL Wolfsburg
- Number: 11

Youth career
- 2005–2013: Holstein Kiel
- 2013–2016: Schalke 04

Senior career*
| Years | Team | Apps | (Gls) |
| 2015–2019 | Schalke 04 | 13 | (0) |
| 2016–2019 | Schalke 04 II | 19 | (7) |
| 2017 | → Karlsruher SC (loan) | 10 | (0) |
| 2017 | → Karlsruher SC II (loan) | 2 | (0) |
| 2018–2019 | → Greuther Fürth (loan) | 44 | (3) |
| 2020–2023 | Holstein Kiel | 109 | (15) |
| 2023–2026 | Hertha BSC | 82 | (30) |
| 2026– | VfL Wolfsburg | 6 | (3) |

International career
| 2016 | Germany U19 | 5 | (0) |
| 2016–2017 | Germany U20 | 10 | (3) |
- * Club domestic league appearances and goals as of 18 September 2026

Fabian Reese (German pronunciation: [ˈfaːbi̯aːn ˈʁeːzə]; born 29 November 1997) is a German professional footballer who plays as a winger or striker for 2. Bundesliga club VfL Wolfsburg.

== Club career ==
Reese began with football in the youth of Holstein Kiel and joined the youth academy (Nachwuchsleistungszentrum) of Schalke 04 in 2013. He made his debut in professional football on 21 November 2015 on the 14th matchday of the 2015–16 Bundesliga against Bayern Munich in a 3–1 home defeat. He replaced Max Meyer after 87 minutes. On 16 February 2016, Reese signed his first professional contract of his young career which would run until 30 June 2019 with Schalke 04.

In January 2018, he joined 2. Bundesliga Greuther Fürth on loan until the end of the season. In January 2023, he joined Hertha BSC on a free transfer from Holstein Kiel. On 17 June 2026, he signed for VfL Wolfsburg on a deal until 2030.

== Career statistics ==
As of match played 18 September 2026

Appearances and goals by club, season and competition
| Club | Season | League | | | Cup | | Other | | Total | |
| Club | Season | League | Apps | Goals | Apps | Goals | Apps | Goals | Apps | Goals |
|---|---|---|---|---|---|---|---|---|---|---|
| Schalke 04 | 2015–16 | Bundesliga | 1 | 0 | 0 | 0 | 0 | 0 | 1 | 0 |
| Schalke 04 | 2016–17 | Bundesliga | 3 | 0 | 1 | 0 | 2 (Note: Appearances in UEFA Europa League) | 0 | 6 | 0 |
| Schalke 04 | 2017–18 | Bundesliga | 7 | 0 | 0 | 0 | — | | 7 | 0 |
| Schalke 04 | 2019–20 | Bundesliga | 2 | 0 | 0 | 0 | — | | 2 | 0 |
| Schalke 04 | Total | | 13 | 0 | 1 | 0 | 2 | 0 | 16 | 0 |
| Karlsruher SC (loan) | 2016–17 | 2. Bundesliga | 10 | 0 | 0 | 0 | — | | 10 | 0 |
| Greuther Fürth (loan) | 2017–18 | 2. Bundesliga | 15 | 0 | 0 | 0 | — | | 15 | 0 |
| Greuther Fürth (loan) | 2018–19 | 2. Bundesliga | 29 | 3 | 1 | 0 | — | | 30 | 3 |
| Greuther Fürth (loan) | Total | | 44 | 3 | 1 | 0 | — | | 45 | 3 |
| Holstein Kiel | 2019–20 | 2. Bundesliga | 12 | 1 | 0 | 0 | — | | 12 | 1 |
| Holstein Kiel | 2020–21 | 2. Bundesliga | 32 | 2 | 5 | 1 | 2 (Note: Appearances in promotion play-offs) | 0 | 39 | 3 |
| Holstein Kiel | 2021–22 | 2. Bundesliga | 32 | 1 | 2 | 1 | 0 | 0 | 34 | 2 |
| Holstein Kiel | 2022–23 | 2. Bundesliga | 33 | 11 | 1 | 0 | 0 | 0 | 34 | 11 |
| Holstein Kiel | Total | | 109 | 15 | 8 | 2 | 2 | 0 | 119 | 17 |
| Hertha BSC | 2023–24 | 2. Bundesliga | 31 | 9 | 4 | 4 | 0 | 0 | 35 | 13 |
| Hertha BSC | 2024–25 | 2. Bundesliga | 18 | 11 | 1 | 0 | — | | 19 | 11 |
| Hertha BSC | 2025–26 | 2. Bundesliga | 33 | 10 | 4 | 1 | — | | 37 | 11 |
| Hertha BSC | Total | | 82 | 30 | 9 | 5 | 0 | 0 | 91 | 5 |
| VfL Wolfsburg | 2026–27 | 2. Bundesliga | 6 | 3 | 1 | 0 | — | | 7 | 3 |
| Career total | | | 264 | 51 | 20 | 7 | 4 | 0 | 288 | 58 |
