= Janni Serra =

German footballer (born 1998)

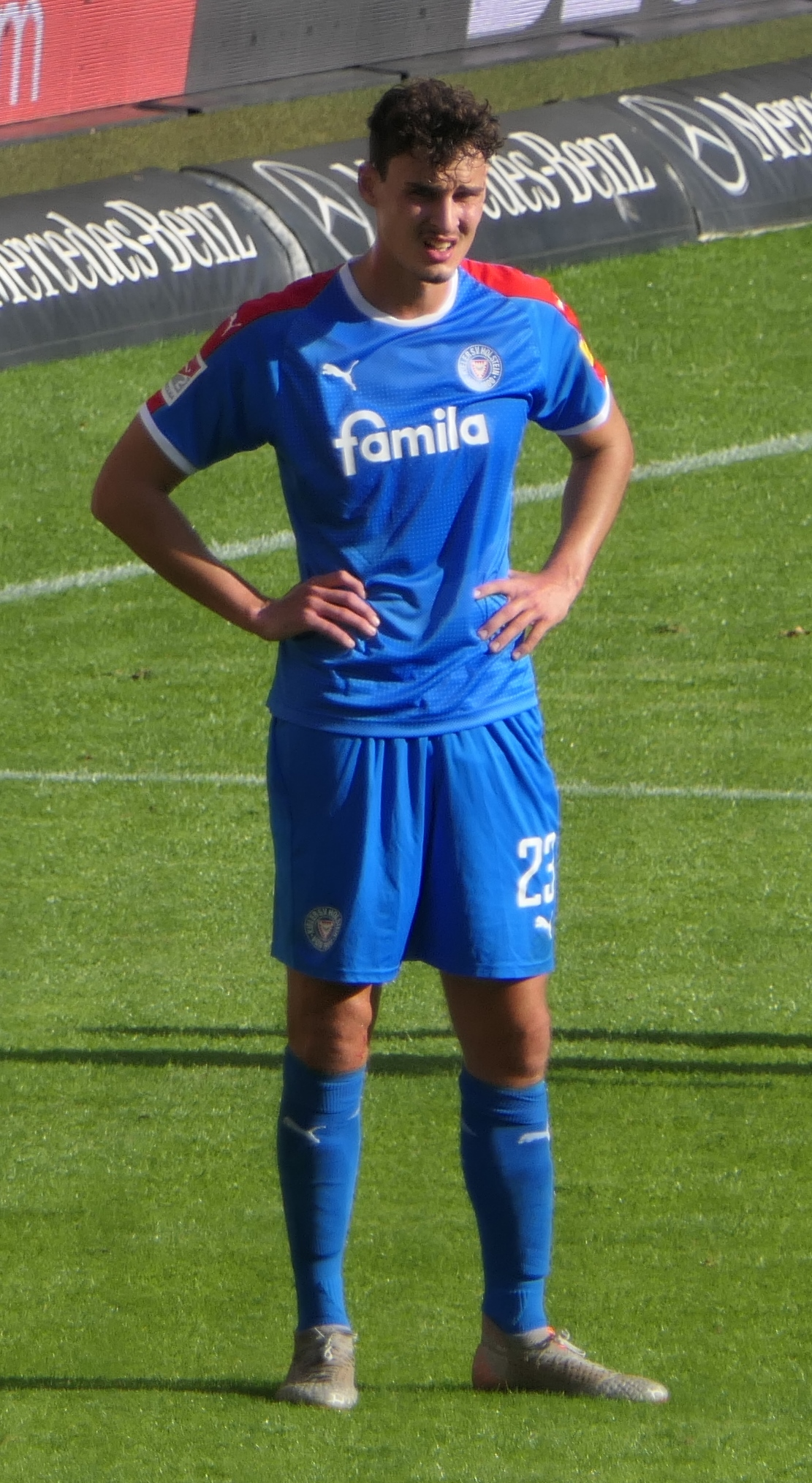
- Serra with Holstein Kiel in 2019

Personal information
- Full name: Janni-Luca Serra
- Date of birth: 13 March 1998 (age 28)
- Place of birth: Springe, Germany
- Height: 1.93 m (6 ft 4 in)
- Position: Forward

Team information
- Current team: AGF
- Number: 13

Youth career
- –2008: FC Bennigsen
- 2008–2010: Hannover 96
- 2010–2013: TSV Havelse
- 2013–2014: Hannover 96
- 2014–2017: Borussia Dortmund

Senior career*
Years	Team	Apps	(Gls)
2017–2018	Borussia Dortmund II	13	(3)
2018	→ VfL Bochum (loan)	12	(0)
2018–2021	Holstein Kiel	80	(30)
2021–2023	Arminia Bielefeld	56	(10)
2023–	AGF	48	(10)
2024–2025	→ 1. FC Nürnberg (loan)	8	(0)

International career
2015	Germany U17	10	(1)
2016	Germany U18	1	(0)
2016	Germany U19	4	(0)
2017–2019	Germany U21	16	(2)
Medal record
Men's football
Representing Germany
UEFA European Under-17 Championship
Runner-up	2015 Bulgaria
- * Club domestic league appearances and goals as of 16:43, 11 May 2026 (UTC)

Janni-Luca Serra (born 13 March 1998) is a German professional footballer who plays as a forward for Danish Superliga club AGF.

== Career ==
=== Early career ===
Janni-Luca Serra was born in Springe, Lower Saxony, and began playing soccer in the youth teams of SG Bredenbeck-Holtensen, where he is still an honorary member. Initially playing as a defender, he moved to the youth department of Hannover 96 at the age of 10, where he trained for a total of three years, interrupted by a move to TSV Havelse. As a 16-year-old, he was signed by Bundesliga club Borussia Dortmund to play for the club's youth teams. After winning one championship with the under-17s and two with the under-19s, Serra made his debut for Borussia Dortmund II on 30 July 2017, in a home game against Rot-Weiss Essen in the Regionalliga West. During his time at Dortmund II, he also began to eventually establish himself as a striker.

During the winter break of the 2017–18 season, BVB loaned him to 2. Bundesliga club VfL Bochum, where he gained experience in professional football in twelve brief appearances.

=== Holstein Kiel ===
For the 2018–19 season, Serra moved permanently to the 2. Bundesliga, joining newly promoted club Holstein Kiel on a three-year contract until 2021. Under coach Tim Walter, Serra became a regular starter right away, making 30 league appearances in his first season (25 of which were starting appearances). He also played in all three cup matches. He scored his first goal in professional football on 22 September 2018, with a last minute header in a 2–2 draw against his former club VfL Bochum. With a total of 11 goals, he was the team's top scorer of the season. He retained his place in the starting XI in the following season under new head coach Ole Werner, scoring a total of eight goals in 19 league games and two cup appearances until February 2020. However, a thigh injury kept him out of play until the end of the season, which Kiel finished in 11th place.

In the 2020–21 season, Serra was once again part of the first team. The striker appeared in 31 league games (25 times as starter) in which he scored 13 goals. He finished the season in third place with his team and thus qualified for the promotion playoffs, which were lost to 1. FC Köln. In the 2020–21 DFB-Pokal, he advanced to the semifinals with Kiel, where the team lost to his youth club Borussia Dortmund. Serra appeared in all five cup games, scoring three goals.

=== Arminia Bielefeld ===
After fulfilling his contract with Holstein Kiel, Serra moved to Bundesliga club Arminia Bielefeld for the 2021–22 season. His contract was due to last until 30 June 2025. On the first matchday of the season, he made his Bundesliga debut in a goalless draw against SC Freiburg. He scored his first goal in the top flight on 18 December 2021 in a 2–0 away win against RB Leipzig.

=== AGF ===
On 4 July 2023 Danish Superliga club AGF confirmed, that they had signed Serra as a free agent on a four-year contract.

On 26 July 2024, Serra moved on loan to 1. FC Nürnberg in 2. Bundesliga, with an option to buy. He returned to AGF at the end of the spell.

In 2026 he won the Danish Championship with the club, the first in 40 years.

== International career ==
Serra has made 31 appearances for four different DFB junior national teams so far, including ten for the German under-17s (with whom he finished second at the 2015 European Championship) and four for the under-19s. On 21 July 2016, he tore his ACL during a match at the 2016 UEFA European Under-19 Championship and underwent a total of four surgeries during the remainder of 2016. He made his comeback on the pitch in April 2017 in the Under-19 Bundesliga.

On 1 September 2017, Serra made his first appearance for the under-21 national team, coached by Stefan Kuntz, against Hungary.

== Personal life ==
Serra has an older brother (Nikola) and a younger brother (Petja), both of whom are also soccer players. His late father Ralf also used to play low-level soccer and worked for the Lower Saxony Football Association as a coach.

Serra is of distant Sardinian descent.

== Career statistics ==
As of 23 May 2021

Appearances and goals by club, season and competition
Club	Season	League			DFB-Pokal		Total	
Club	Season	Division	Apps	Goals	Apps	Goals	Apps	Goals
Borussia Dortmund II	2017–18	Regionalliga West	13	3	—		13	3
VfL Bochum (loan)	2017–18	2. Bundesliga	12	0	0	0	12	0
Holstein Kiel	2018–19	2. Bundesliga	30	10	3	1	33	11
Holstein Kiel	2019–20	2. Bundesliga	19	7	2	1	21	8
Holstein Kiel	2020–21	2. Bundesliga	31	13	5	3	36	16
Holstein Kiel	Total		80	30	10	5	90	35
Career total			105	33	10	5	115	38

== Honours ==
AGF

- Danish Superliga: 2025–26
