= Alexander Mühling =

German footballer (born 1992)

Personal information
- Birth name: Alexander Bieler
- Date of birth: 5 September 1992 (age 34)
- Place of birth: Oberhausen, Germany
- Height: 1.86 m (6 ft 1 in)
- Position: Midfielder

Team information
- Current team: Rot-Weiß Oberhausen
- Number: 8

Youth career
- BV Osterfeld
- –2003: Arminia Klosterhardt
- 2003–2008: MSV Duisburg
- 1995–2011: Borussia Mönchengladbach

Senior career*
Years	Team	Apps	(Gls)
2011–2013	Borussia Mönchengladbach II	67	(3)
2013–2014	Bayer Leverkusen II	15	(4)
2014	Bayer Leverkusen	0	(0)
2014–2016	SV Sandhausen	39	(4)
2016–2023	Holstein Kiel	217	(39)
2023–2025	SV Sandhausen	54	(1)
2025–	Rot-Weiß Oberhausen	33	(1)

International career
2010	Germany U18	3	(0)
- * Club domestic league appearances and goals as of 23 September 2026

Alexander Mühling (né Bieler; born 5 September 1992) is a German professional footballer who plays as a midfielder for Rot-Weiß Oberhausen. He was born Alexander Bieler but decided to adopt his wife's surname, Mühling, in the summer of 2017.

He was a youth international for Germany, earning three caps for the under-18 team in 2010.
