= Jonas Meffert =

German footballer

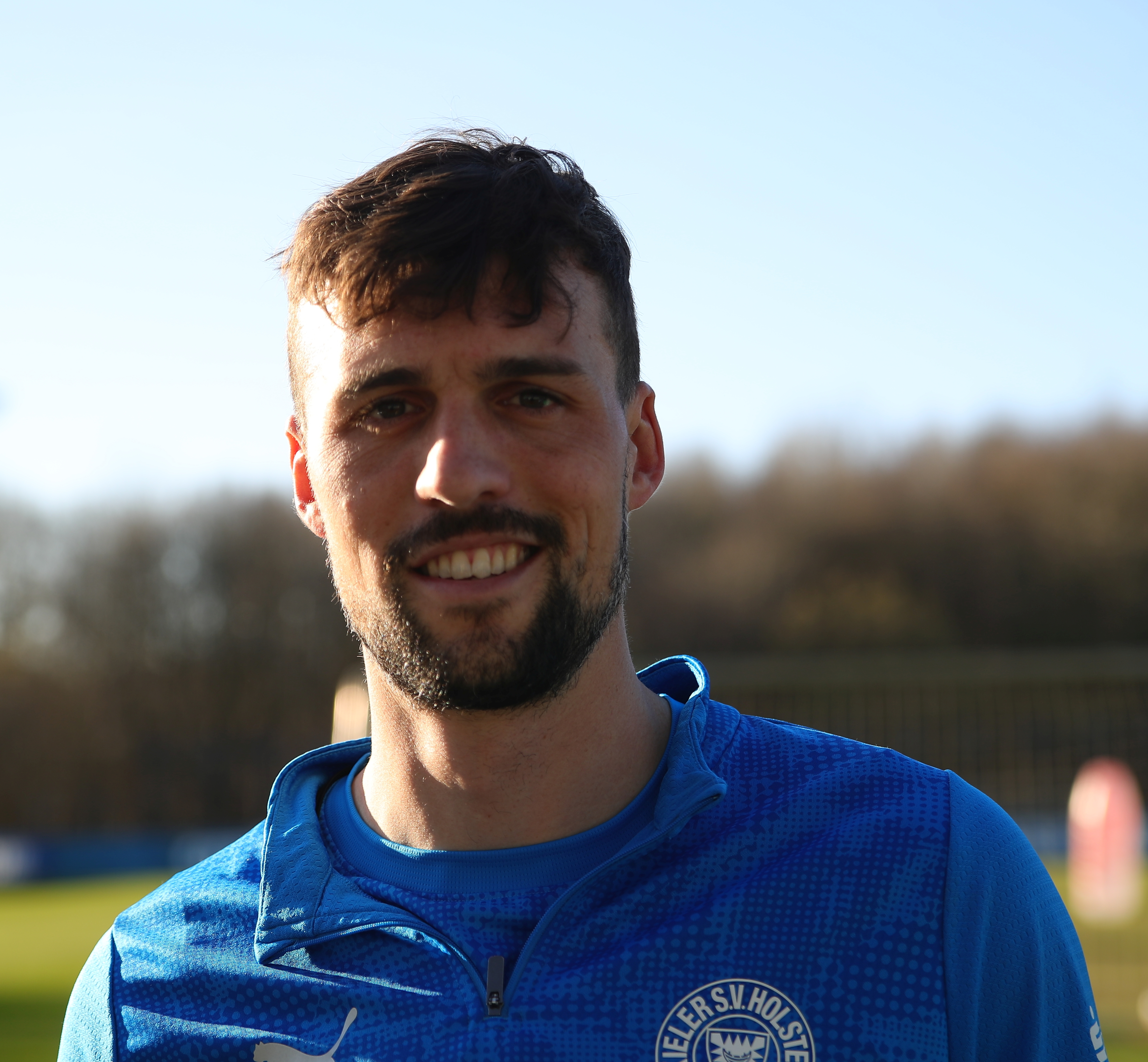
- Meffert in 2026

Personal information
- Date of birth: 4 September 1994 (age 32)
- Place of birth: Cologne, Germany
- Height: 1.84 m (6 ft 0 in)
- Position: Defensive midfielder

Team information
- Current team: Holstein Kiel
- Number: 28

Youth career
- 2005–2013: Bayer Leverkusen

Senior career*
Years	Team	Apps	(Gls)
2012–2014	Bayer Leverkusen II	37	(1)
2013–2014	Bayer Leverkusen	0	(0)
2014–2016	Karlsruher SC	49	(1)
2016–2018	SC Freiburg	1	(0)
2016–2018	→ SC Freiburg II	14	(2)
2017	→ Karlsruher SC (loan)	9	(1)
2018–2021	Holstein Kiel	87	(5)
2021–2025	Hamburger SV	130	(3)
2025–	Holstein Kiel	17	(1)

International career^{‡}
2009–2010	Germany U16	1	(0)
2010–2011	Germany U17	2	(0)
2012–2013	Germany U19	7	(0)
- * Club domestic league appearances and goals as of 18 May 2026 ‡ National team caps and goals as of 30 June 2013

Jonas Meffert (born 4 September 1994) is a German professional footballer who plays as a defensive midfielder for 2. Bundesliga club Holstein Kiel.

== Career ==
On 6 May 2014, Meffert signed a three-year contract with Karlsruher SC.

On 31 May 2016, he signed for SC Freiburg.

In July 2018, Meffert joined 2. Bundesliga side Holstein Kiel signing a three-year contract until 2021.

On 3 January 2026, Meffert returned to Holstein Kiel after playing for four-and-a-half seasons at Hamburger SV.

== Career statistics ==
As of 13 December 2025

Appearances and goals by club, season and competition
Club	Season	League			Cup^{1}		Continental^{2}		Other^{3}		Total	
Club	Season	League	Apps	Goals	Apps	Goals	Apps	Goals	Apps	Goals	Apps	Goals
Bayer Leverkusen	2012–13	Bundesliga	0	0	0	0	1	0	—		1	0
Bayer Leverkusen II	2012–13	Regionalliga West	1	0	—		—		—		1	0
Bayer Leverkusen II	2013–14	Regionalliga West	36	1	—		—		—		36	1
Bayer Leverkusen II	Total		37	1	0	0	0	0	0	0	37	1
Karlsruhe II	2014–15	Oberliga Baden-Württemberg	1	0	—		—		—		1	0
Karlsruhe	2014–15	2. Bundesliga	25	0	1	0	—		2	0	28	0
Karlsruhe	2015–16	2. Bundesliga	24	1	1	0	—		—		25	1
Karlsruhe	Total		49	1	2	0	0	0	2	0	53	1
Freiburg	2016–17	Bundesliga	1	0	2	0	—		—		3	0
Freiburg II	2016–17	Oberliga Baden-Württemberg	2	1	—		—		—		2	1
Freiburg II	2016–17	Regionalliga Südwest	12	1	—		—		—		12	1
Freiburg II	Total		14	2	0	0	0	0	0	0	14	2
Karlsruhe (loan)	2016–17	2. Bundesliga	9	1	0	0	—		—		9	1
Holstein Kiel	2018–19	2. Bundesliga	27	3	3	0	—		—		30	3
Holstein Kiel	2019–20	2. Bundesliga	26	2	0	0	—		—		26	2
Holstein Kiel	2020–21	2. Bundesliga	34	0	5	0	—		1^3	0	40	0
Holstein Kiel	Total		87	5	8	0	0	0	1	0	96	5
Hamburger SV	2021–22	2. Bundesliga	33	1	4	0	—		2^3	0	39	1
Hamburger SV	2022–23	2. Bundesliga	32	0	2	0	—		—		34	0
Hamburger SV	2023–24	2. Bundesliga	32	2	1	0	—		—		33	2
Hamburger SV	2024–25	2. Bundesliga	29	0	2	1	—		—		31	1
Hamburger SV	2025–26	Bundesliga	4	0	3	0	—		—		7	0
Hamburger SV	Total		130	3	12	1	—		—		142	4
Career total			328	13	24	1	1	0	5	0	358	14

- 1.Includes German Cup.
- 2.Includes UEFA Europa League.
- 3.Includes Promotion/relegation playoff.
