= Joshua Mees =

German footballer

Personal information
- Date of birth: 15 April 1996 (age 30)
- Place of birth: Lebach, Germany
- Height: 1.80 m (5 ft 11 in)
- Position: Forward

Team information
- Current team: SC Preußen Münster
- Number: 8

Youth career
- –2011: 1. FC Saarbrücken
- 2011–2015: 1899 Hoffenheim

Senior career*
Years	Team	Apps	(Gls)
2015–2018	1899 Hoffenheim	0	(0)
2015–2016	→ SC Freiburg (loan)	0	(0)
2016–2017	1899 Hoffenheim II	32	(12)
2017–2018	→ Jahn Regensburg (loan)	22	(6)
2018–2020	Union Berlin	37	(6)
2020–2024	Holstein Kiel	58	(8)
2022–2023	→ Jahn Regensburg (loan)	33	(1)
2024–	SC Preußen Münster	44	(11)

International career^{‡}
2015	Germany U20	2	(0)
- * Club domestic league appearances and goals as of 18 May 2026 ‡ National team caps and goals as of 17:02, 29 July 2017 (UTC)

Joshua Mees (born 15 April 1996) is a German professional footballer who plays as a forward for 3. Liga club SC Preußen Münster.

== Career ==
Mees made his professional debut with SSV Jahn Regensburg on 29 July 2017 in a 2–1 loss against Arminia Bielefeld.

Mees moved to 2. Bundesliga club Holstein Kiel from Union Berlin. He signed a four-year contract.

On 18 June 2024, Mees signed with SC Preußen Münster.
