= 2025–26 SpVgg Greuther Fürth season =

German association football club season

SpVgg Greuther Fürth
2025–26 season
- Head coach: Thomas Kleine (until 1 December); Heiko Vogel (from 1 December)
- Stadium: Sportpark Ronhof Thomas Sommer
- 2. Bundesliga: 16th (play-off winners)
- DFB-Pokal: Second round
- Top goalscorer: League: Noel Futkeu (19); All: Noel Futkeu (20)
- Highest home attendance: 15,621
- Lowest home attendance: 10,175
- Average home league attendance: 12,742
- Biggest win: Fürth 3–0 Fortuna Düsseldorf; 2. Bundesliga (17 May 2026)
- Biggest defeat: SV Elversberg 6–0 Fürth; 2. Bundesliga (19 October 2025)
Home colours	Away colours	Third colours

The 2025–26 season was the 123rd season in the history of SpVgg Greuther Fürth, and their fourth consecutive season in the 2. Bundesliga. In addition to the domestic league, the club participated in the DFB-Pokal.

== Players ==
=== First-team squad ===
As of 22 February 2026

Note: Flags indicate national team as defined under FIFA eligibility rules; some limited exceptions apply. Players may hold more than one non-FIFA nationality.

No.	Pos.	Nation	Player
1	GK	GER	Nils Körber
2	DF	GER	Lukas Reich
4	DF	GER	Philipp Ziereis
5	DF	GER	Reno Münz
6	MF	BFA	Sacha Bansé
7	FW	GER	Dennis Srbeny
9	FW	GER	Noel Futkeu
10	FW	SWE	Branimir Hrgota (captain)
11	MF	LUX	Aiman Dardari (on loan from FC Augsburg)
13	MF	GER	Paul Will (on loan from Darmstadt 98)
14	MF	GER	Jomaine Consbruch
15	DF	SUI	Jan Elvedi (on loan from 1. FC Kaiserslautern)
16	MF	SUI	Aaron Keller
17	DF	GER	Noah König
18	FW	GER	Felix Higl
21	GK	GER	Timo Schlieck (on loan from RB Leipzig)
22	MF	URU	Juan Cabrera
23	DF	GER	Jannik Dehm

No.	Pos.	Nation	Player
24	DF	GER	Marco John
25	DF	ISL	Brynjar Ingi Bjarnason
26	GK	NED	Pelle Boevink
27	DF	GER	Luca Itter
28	MF	FIN	Doni Arifi
30	MF	GER	Felix Klaus
33	DF	USA	Maximilian Dietz
34	MF	GER	Marlon Fries
35	MF	GER	Jakob Engel
36	DF	GER	Christoph Meister
37	MF	USA	Julian Green
38	DF	ROU	Raul Marița
40	DF	GER	David Abrangao
43	GK	GER	Silas Prüfrock
44	MF	GER	Mehmet Avlayici
45	MF	POR	Keyan Varela (on loan from Servette)
47	MF	TUN	Sayfallah Ltaief (on loan from Twente)
49	FW	MDA	Lado Akhalaia

=== Out on loan ===
Note: Flags indicate national team as defined under FIFA eligibility rules; some limited exceptions apply. Players may hold more than one non-FIFA nationality.

No.	Pos.	Nation	Player
—	GK	GER	Sebastian Jung (at KFC Komárno until 30 June 2026)
—	DF	GER	Matti Wagner (at Alemannia Aachen until 30 June 2026)
—	MF	GER	Philipp Müller (at Jahn Regensburg until 30 June 2026)

No.	Pos.	Nation	Player
—	MF	LUX	Mathias Olesen (at Grazer AK until 30 June 2026)
—	FW	GER	Leander Popp (at Viktoria Köln until 30 June 2026)
—	FW	GER	Omar Sillah (at Alemannia Aachen until 30 June 2026)

== Transfers ==
=== Transfers in ===
Date	Player	From	Type	Ref
23 July 2025	Brynjar Ingi Bjarnason	HamKam	Free	
25 June 2025	Felix Higl	SSV Ulm	Free	
18 June 2025	Aaron Keller	SpVgg Unterhaching	Transfer	
17 June 2025	Pelle Boevink	FC Ingolstadt	Free	
16 June 2025	Jannik Dehm	Hannover 96	Free	
10 June 2025	Mathias Olesen	Free agent	Free	
2 June 2025	Philipp Ziereis	LASK	Free	
29 May 2025	Lukas Reich	1860 Munich	Transfer	
29 May 2025	Juan Cabrera	FC Augsburg	Free	

=== Loans in ===
Date	Player	From	Type	Ref
No loan arrivals during the summer.

=== Transfers out ===
Date	Player	To	Type	Ref
Summer 2025	Simon Asta	1. FC Kaiserslautern	Transfer	
Summer 2025	Kerim Çalhanoğlu	HNK Vukovar	Transfer	
Summer 2025	Niko Gießelmann	Released	Free	
Summer 2025	Gideon Jung	Kayserispor	Transfer	
Summer 2025	Daniel Kasper	KAS Eupen	Transfer	
Summer 2025	Roberto Massimo	Górnik Zabrze	Transfer	
Summer 2025	Denis Pfaffenrot	SV Sandhausen	Transfer	
Summer 2025	Moritz Schulze	Released	Free	

=== Loans out ===
Date	Player	To	Type	Ref
Summer 2025	Lennart Grill	Union Berlin	Loan	
Summer 2025	Noah Loosli	VfL Bochum	Loan	
Summer 2025	Jannik Mause	1. FC Kaiserslautern	Loan	
Summer 2025	Nemanja Motika	Olimpija Ljubljana	Loan	
Summer 2025	Philipp Müller	Jahn Regensburg	Loan	
Summer 2025	Nahuel Noll	TSG Hoffenheim	Loan	
Summer 2025	Matti Wagner	Alemannia Aachen	Loan	

== Competitions ==
=== Overall record ===
Competition	First match	Last match	Starting round	Final position	Record							
Competition	First match	Last match	Starting round	Final position	Pld	W	D	L	GF	GA	GD	Win %
2. Bundesliga	3 August 2025	17 May 2026	Matchday 1	16th	34	10	7	17	44	65	−21	29.41
2. Bundesliga relegation play-offs	22 May 2026	26 May 2026	First leg	Winners	2	1	0	1	2	1	+1	50.00
DFB-Pokal	17 August 2025	29 October 2025	First round	Second round	2	1	0	1	2	1	+1	50.00
Total					38	12	7	19	48	67	−19	31.58

Source: Greuther Fürth

== 2. Bundesliga ==
=== League table ===
Pos	Team	Pld	W	D	L	GF	GA	GD	Pts	Promotion, qualification or relegation
14	1. FC Magdeburg	34	12	3	19	52	58	−6	39	
15	Eintracht Braunschweig	34	10	7	17	36	54	−18	37	
16	Greuther Fürth (O)	34	10	7	17	49	68	−19	37	Qualification for relegation play-offs
17	Fortuna Düsseldorf (R)	34	11	4	19	33	53	−20	37	Relegation to 3. Liga
18	Preußen Münster (R)	34	6	12	16	38	61	−23	30	Relegation to 3. Liga

Source: Bundesliga
Rules for classification: 1) Points; 2) Goal difference; 3) Goals scored; 4) Head-to-head results; 5) Head-to-head away goals scored; 6) Away goals scored; 7) Play-off.
(Rules 4–6 only apply after home and away matches have been played between the tied teams.)
(O) Play-off winners; (R) Relegated

=== Results summary ===
Overall								Home						Away					
Pld	W	D	L	GF	GA	GD	Pts	W	D	L	GF	GA	GD	W	D	L	GF	GA	GD
34	10	7	17	49	68	−19	37	6	5	6	26	31	−5	4	2	11	23	37	−14

Last updated: 4 June 2026.
Source: 2. Bundesliga

=== Results by round ===
Round	1	2	3	4	5	6	7	8	9	10	11	12	13	14	15	16	17	18	19	20	21	22	23	24	25	26	27	28	29	30	31	32	33	34
Ground	H	A	H	A	H	A	H	A	H	A	H	A	H	A	H	A	H	A	H	A	H	A	H	H	A	H	A	H	A	H	A	H	A	H
Result	W	L	L	W	L	W	L	W	L	L	D	L	L	L	D	D	L	L	D	W	L	L	W	D	W	W	L	L	D	W	L	D	L	W
Position	14	12	16	12	15	13	16	14	16	17	16	16	17	17	16	15	17	18	18	18	18	18	18	17	16	12	14	17	17	14	17	17	17	16
Points	3	3	3	6	6	9	9	12	12	12	13	13	13	13	14	15	15	15	16	19	19	19	22	23	26	29	29	29	30	33	33	34	34	37

Updated to match(es) played on 17 May 2026. Source: Bundesliga.com - 2. Bundesliga Table & Results
A = Away; H = Home; W = Win; D = Draw; L = Loss

=== Matches ===
3 August 2025 Matchday 1	SpVgg Greuther Fürth	3–2	Dynamo Dresden	Sportpark Ronhof Thomas Sommer, Fürth
13:30 CEST (UTC+2)	Futkeu 1', 51'; Klaus 9' (yellow card) 27'	Report	Daferner 11'; Kammerknecht 74'	Attendance: 15,621; Referee: Lars Erbst

9 August 2025 Matchday 2	Eintracht Braunschweig	3–2	SpVgg Greuther Fürth	Eintracht-Stadion, Braunschweig
13:00 CEST (UTC+2)	Frenkert 32'; Yardimci 35'; Marie (yellow card) 62'; Polter 90+6'; Aydin (yellow card) 90+8'	Report	Klaus 16' (yellow card) 45+2'; Ziereis (yellow card) 45+3'; Olesen (yellow card) 82'; Higl 88'	Attendance: 20,274; Referee: Konrad Oldhfer

24 August 2025 Matchday 3	SpVgg Greuther Fürth	0–2	Holstein Kiel	Sportpark Ronhof Thomas Sommer, Fürth
13:30 CEST (UTC+2)	Dehm (yellow card) 25'; Hrgota (yellow card) 56'; Boevink (yellow card) 90+1'	Report	Zec (yellow card) 22'; Therkelsen 31'; Komenda (yellow card) 59'; Knudsen (yellow card) 63'; Bernhardsson (yellow card) 73'; Rosenboom (yellow card) 81'; Müller (yellow card) 89'; Schwab (yellow card) 90+1'; Davidsen (yellow card) 90+5'; Tolkin 90+5'	Attendance: 11,005; Referee: Felix Bickel

31 August 2025 Matchday 4	1. FC Magdeburg	4–5	SpVgg Greuther Fürth	MDCC-Arena, Magdeburg
13:30 CEST (UTC+2)	Holmström 28', 64'; Geschwill (yellow card) 59'; Nollenberger (yellow card) 67' (yellow-red card) 71'; Atik (yellow card) 72'; Ghrieb 83' (yellow card) 84'; Pesch 90+3'	Report	Keller (yellow card) 14'; Futkeu 24', 69'; Klaus 63', 77' (yellow card) 90+10'; Ziereis (yellow card) 87'; Dehm (yellow card) 90+4'; John 90+9'	Attendance: 23,673; Referee: Patrick Alt

14 September 2025 Matchday 5	SpVgg Greuther Fürth	0–3	1. FC Kaiserslautern	Sportpark Ronhof Thomas Sommer, Fürth
13:30 CEST (UTC+2)	König (red card) 1'; Kleine (yellow card) 26'; Olesen (yellow card) 39'	Report	Joly (yellow card) 6'; Alidou (yellow card) 23'; Skyttä 33' (yellow card) 45+4'; Haas (yellow card) 43'; Gyamfi (yellow card) 45+3'; Kunze (yellow card) 53'; Prtajin 58', 64'	Attendance: 14,657; Referee: Richard Hempel

19 September 2025 Matchday 6	Arminia Bielefeld	1–3	SpVgg Greuther Fürth	SchücoArena, Bielefeld
18:30 CEST (UTC+2)	Young (yellow card) 45'; Wörl 50'; Mehlem (yellow card) 82'	Report	Futkeu 25'; Klaus (yellow card) 36' (goal) 90+4'; John 81'	Attendance: 25,836; Referee: Tobias Welz

26 September 2025 Matchday 7	FC Schalke 04	1–0	SpVgg Greuther Fürth	Veltins-Arena, Gelsenkirchen
18:30 CEST (UTC+2)	Porath 77'; Katic (yellow card) 90+2'; Becker (yellow card) 90+8'	Report	Dehm (yellow card) 25'; Philipp Ziereis (yellow card) 46'	Referee: Tom Bauer

5 October 2025 Matchday 8	SpVgg Greuther Fürth	2–2	Hannover 96	Sportpark Ronhof Thomas Sommer, Fürth
13:30 CEST (UTC+2)	Futkeu 24'; Münz (yellow card) 45+1'; Consbruch (yellow card) 56'; Abrangao 82'	Report	Källman 6'; Tomiak (yellow card) 39'; Matsuda 61'	Referee: Jarno Wienefeld

18 October 2025 Matchday 9	SV Elversberg	6–0	SpVgg Greuther Fürth	Ursapharm-Arena an der Kaiserlinde, Spiesen-Elversberg
17:00 CEST (UTC+2)	Petkov (yellow card) 24'; Conte 27'; Ebnoutalib 48', 56', 80'; Ceka 85'; Le Joncour 90+4'	Report	Ziereis (yellow card) 19'; Dietz (yellow card) 45+1'; Green (yellow card) 71'	Referee: Felix Bickel

25 October 2025 Matchday 10	SpVgg Greuther Fürth	1–4	Karlsruher SC	Sportpark Ronhof Thomas Sommer, Fürth
17:00 CET (UTC+1)	Hrgota 90+1'	Report	Schleusener 3'; Beifus (yellow card) 25'; Egloff 34'; Wanitzek (yellow card) 48' (goal) 78', 90+5'; Rapp (yellow card) 90+7'	Attendance: 12,254; Referee: Eric-Dominic Weisbach

2 November 2025 Matchday 11	SC Paderborn 07	2–1	SpVgg Greuther Fürth	Benteler-Arena, Paderborn
13:30 CET (UTC+1)	Curda 37'; Bilbija 64'; Wörner (yellow card) 90+3'	Report	Dietz (yellow card) 21'; Ziereis (yellow card) 36'; Srbeny (yellow card) 86'; Sillah 90'	Attendance: 13,919; Referee: Patrick Alt

8 November 2025 Matchday 12	SpVgg Greuther Fürth	1–0	Preußen Münster	Sportpark Ronhof Thomas Sommer, Fürth
18:30 CET (UTC+1)	Olesen (yellow card) 90+1'; Dehm 90+5'; Boevink (yellow card) 90+6'	Report	Bouchama (yellow card) 22'; Kirkeskov (yellow card) 52'; Bolay (yellow card) 57'; Paetow (yellow card) 77'	Attendance: 10,175; Referee: Timo Gansloweit

22 November 2025 Matchday 13	SV Darmstadt 98	4–2	SpVgg Greuther Fürth	Darmstadt
20:30 CET (UTC+1)	Lidberg 58'; Hornby 63'; Vukotić (yellow card) 68'; Papela 78'	Report	Futkeu 38' (pen.), 52'; Abrangao (yellow card) 45+4'; Reich (yellow card) 45+5'; Dietz (yellow card) 60'	Stadium: Merck-Stadion am Böllenfalltor; Attendance: 17,065; Referee: Max Burda

29 November 2025 Matchday 14	SpVgg Greuther Fürth	0–3	VfL Bochum	Sportpark Ronhof Thomas Sommer, Fürth
13:00 CET (UTC+1)	Futkeu (yellow card) 30'; Ziereis (yellow card) 63'	Report	Sissoko 8', 12'; Hofmann 17'	Attendance: 10,879

6 December 2025 Matchday 15	1. FC Nürnberg	2–2	SpVgg Greuther Fürth	Max-Morlock-Stadion, Nuremberg
13:30 CET (UTC+1)	Janisch (yellow card) 12'; Lochoshvili 48'; Zoma 57'; Becker (yellow card) 88'	Report	Futkeu (yellow card) 12'; Klaus 54'; Keller 61'; Dehm (yellow card) 63'; Schlieck (yellow card) 90+5'	Referee: Lars Erbst

12 December 2025 Matchday 16	SpVgg Greuther Fürth	3–3	Hertha BSC	Sportpark Ronhof Thomas Sommer, Fürth
16:00 CET (UTC+1)	Hrgota 42'; Klaus 58', (yellow card) 88'; Ziereis (yellow card) 65'; Srbeny 81'	Report	Dárdai (yellow card) 24'; Reese 33'; Schuler 36', 62'; Winkler (yellow card) 56'; Cuisance (yellow card) 85'	Attendance: 12,276; Referee: Tom Bauer

20 December 2025 Matchday 17	Fortuna Düsseldorf	2–1	SpVgg Greuther Fürth	Merkur Spiel-Arena, Düsseldorf
13:30 CET (UTC+1)	Rasmussen (yellow card) 17'; Itten 24'; Egouli (yellow card) 38'; Muslija (yellow card) 44', (goal) 65'; Daland (yellow card) 85'	Report	Olesen (yellow card) 70'; Futkeu 86' (pen.); Reich (yellow card) 89'	Attendance: 48,500; Referee: Timo Gerach

17 January 2026 Matchday 18	Dynamo Dresden	2–0	SpVgg Greuther Fürth	Rudolf-Harbig-Stadion, Dresden
13:00 CET (UTC+1)	Wagner (yellow card) 26'; Keller 35'; Lemmer 50' (yellow card) 57'; Vermeij (yellow card) 65'	Report	Dehm (yellow card) 23'; Ziereis (yellow card) 40'; Dietz (yellow card) 83'	Attendance: 30,811; Referee: Felix Prigan

24 January 2026 Matchday 19	SpVgg Greuther Fürth	0–0	Eintracht Braunschweig	Sportpark Ronhof Thomas Sommer, Fürth
13:00 CET (UTC+1)	Dietz (red card) 3'; Higl (yellow card) 18'; Srbeny (yellow card) 45+6'; Ziereis (yellow card) 74'	Report	Köhler (yellow card) 27'; Ehlers (yellow card) 34'	Referee: Patrick Schwengers

31 January 2026 Matchday 20	Holstein Kiel	1–2	SpVgg Greuther Fürth	Holstein-Stadion, Kiel
13:00 CET (UTC+1)	Ivezić (yellow card) 39'; Meffert 60'; Tohumcu (yellow card) 90+2'; Kelati (yellow card) 90+6'	Report	Keller 50' (yellow card) 90+2'; Futkeu 99' (pen.)	Attendance: 11,594; Referee: Marc-Philipp Eckermann

6 February 2026 Matchday 21	SpVgg Greuther Fürth	4–5	1. FC Magdeburg	Sportpark Ronhof Thomas Sommer, Fürth
18:30 CET (UTC+1)	Ingi Bjarnason 8'; Arifi 43'; Dehm (yellow card) 45+1'; Elvedi 45+5'; Ltaief 47'	Report	Münz 13' (o.g.); Żukowski 15', 29', 33'; Ghrieb 23'; Müller (yellow card) 45+3'; Musonda (yellow card) 51'

14 February 2026 Matchday 22	1. FC Kaiserslautern	1–0	SpVgg Greuther Fürth	Fritz-Walter-Stadion, Kaiserslautern
13:00 CET (UTC+1)	Şahin 10'; Chernev (yellow card) 18'; Kim (yellow card) 53'	Report	Bjarnason (yellow card) 45'; Münz (yellow card) 55'; Will (yellow card) 70'	Attendance: 49,327; Referee: Tobias Reichel

20 February 2026 Matchday 23	SpVgg Greuther Fürth	2–1	Arminia Bielefeld	Sportpark Ronhof Thomas Sommer, Fürth
18:30 CET (UTC+1)	Hrgota 4'; Srbeny 53'; Futkeu (yellow card) 90+5'; Marita (yellow card) 90+6'	Report	Knoche 19'; Handwerker (yellow card) 64'; Grodowski (yellow card) 70'; Mehlem (yellow card) 90+8'	Attendance: 10,990; Referee: Wolfgang Haslberger

28 February 2026 Matchday 24	SpVgg Greuther Fürth	1–1	FC Schalke 04	Sportpark Ronhof Thomas Sommer, Fürth
13:30 CET (UTC+1)	Srbeny 12'; Hrgota (yellow card) 44'; Reich (yellow card) 81'	Report	Ljubičić (yellow card) 30' (goal) 75'; Kuruçay (yellow card) 60'; N'Diaye (yellow card) 87'; Katić (yellow card) 89'	Attendance: 16,126; Referee: Robert Kampka

8 March 2026 Matchday 25	Hannover 96	1–2	SpVgg Greuther Fürth	HDI-Arena, Hannover
13:30 CET (UTC+1)	Neubauer 50'; Noll (yellow card) 51'; Oudenne (yellow card) 61'; Thórdarson (yellow card) 73'	Report	Futkeu 33'; Dehm 57' (yellow card) 74'	Attendance: 35,600; Referee: Tom Bauer

13 March 2026 Matchday 26	SpVgg Greuther Fürth	2–0	SV Elversberg	Sportpark Ronhof Thomas Sommer, Fürth
18:30 CET (UTC+1)	Hrgota 42'; Dietz (yellow card) 83'; Reich 90+6'	Report	Pherai (yellow card) 76'; Poręba (yellow card) 83'	Attendance: 11,076; Referee: Felix Prigan

22 March 2026 Matchday 27	Karlsruher SC	3–1	SpVgg Greuther Fürth	BBBank Wildpark, Karlsruhe
18:30 CET (UTC+1)	Ambrosius (yellow card) 31'; Kobald (yellow card) 37'; Barbosa 46'; Rapp (yellow card) 52'; Fukuda 90+3'; Schleusener (yellow card) 90+5' (goal) 90+7'	Report	Futkeu 5' (yellow card) 38'	Attendance: 28,959; Referee: Marc Philip Eckermann

5 April 2026 Matchday 28	SpVgg Greuther Fürth	0–2	SC Paderborn 07	Sportpark Ronhof Thomas Sommer, Fürth
13:30 CEST (UTC+2)	Ziereis (yellow card) 67'	Report	Marino 51'; Hansen (yellow card) 68'; Castañeda (yellow card) 84'; Bilbija 86' (yellow card) 90+1'	Attendance: 12,085; Referee: Lars Erbst

11 April 2026 Matchday 29	Preußen Münster	0–0	SpVgg Greuther Fürth	Preußenstadion, Münster
13:00 CEST (UTC+2)		Report		Attendance: 10,279; Referee: Jarno Wienefeld

19 April 2026 Matchday 30	SpVgg Greuther Fürth	3–2	SV Darmstadt 98	Sportpark Ronhof Thomas Sommer, Fürth
13:30 CEST (UTC+2)	Futkeu 41'; Futkeu 85'; Futkeu 90+4'	Report	Lidberg 35'; Furukawa 77'	Attendance: 12,622; Referee: Eric-Dominic Weisbach

26 April 2026 Matchday 31	VfL Bochum	2–1	SpVgg Greuther Fürth	Vonovia Ruhrstadion, Bochum
13:30 CEST (UTC+2)	Hofmann 1', 56'	Report	Futkeu 88'	Referee: Frank Willenborg

3 May 2026 Matchday 32	SpVgg Greuther Fürth	1–1	1. FC Nürnberg	Sportpark Ronhof Thomas Sommer, Fürth
13:30	Futkeu 13'; Klaus (yellow card) 53'; Arifi (yellow card) 90'	Report	Markhiyev (yellow card) 15'; Gruber 45+3'; Fernández (yellow card) 76'	Attendance: 16,126; Referee: Sören Storks

10 May 2026 Matchday 33	Hertha BSC	2–1	SpVgg Greuther Fürth	Olympiastadion, Berlin
13:30	Brekalo (red card) 31'; Eichhorn 55'; Winkler (yellow card) 72'; Reese (yellow card) 79'; Cuisance 84'; Ernst (yellow card) 90+3'	Report	Dehm (yellow card) 37'; Futkeu 88'	Attendance: 44,621; Referee: Michael Bacher

17 May 2026 Matchday 34	SpVgg Greuther Fürth	3–0	Fortuna Düsseldorf	Sportpark Ronhof Thomas Sommer, Fürth
13:30	Klaus 2'; Will (yellow card) 12'; Egouli 16' (o.g.); Futkeu 36'; Itter (yellow card) 77'; Münz (yellow card) 90+3'; Arifi (yellow card) 90+5'	Report	Alexandropoulos (yellow card) 21'; Appelkamp (yellow card) 45+1'; Paulina (yellow card) 79'; Daland (yellow card) 82'; Kastenmeier (yellow card) 90+4'	Attendance: 16,626; Referee: Harm Osmers

=== Relegation play-offs ===
The relegation play-offs took place on 22 and 26 May 2026.

==== Matches ====
22 May 2026	Rot-Weiss Essen	1–0	SpVgg Greuther Fürth	Stadion an der Hafenstraße, Essen
13:30 CEST	Alonso (yellow card) 4'; Müsel 62'	Report	Branimir Hrgota (yellow card) 17'; Jannik Dehm (yellow card) 26'; Philipp Ziereis (yellow card) 90'	Attendance: 18,117

26 May 2026	SpVgg Greuther Fürth	2–0	Rot-Weiss Essen	Sportpark Ronhof Thomas Sommer, Fürth
13:30 CEST	Futkeu 29'; Hrgota 47'	Report	Swajkowski (yellow card) 42'; Kostka (yellow card) 54'; Hüning (yellow card) 90+9'	Attendance: 16,126

SpVgg Greuther Fürth won 2–1 on aggregate, and therefore both clubs remained in their respective leagues.

== DFB-Pokal ==
=== Matches ===
17 September 2025 First round	Blau-Weiß Lohne	0–2	SpVgg Greuther Fürth	Lohne
18:00 CEST (UTC+2)	Zander (yellow card) 36'; Sabah (yellow card) 81' (yellow-red card) 83'; Wengerowski (red card) 90+2'	Report	Olesen 58'; König 84'	Stadium: Heinz-Dettmer-Stadion; Attendance: 4,500; Referee: Felix Weller

29 October 2025 Second round	SpVgg Greuther Fürth	0–1	1. FC Kaiserslautern	Sportpark Ronhof Thomas Sommer, Fürth
18:00 CET (UTC+1)		Report

== Statistics ==
=== Appearances and goals ===
As of 26 May 2026.

No.	Pos	Nat	Player	Total		2. Bundesliga		DFB-Pokal		Relegation play-offs	
No.	Pos	Nat	Player	Apps	Goals	Apps	Goals	Apps	Goals	Apps	Goals
Goalkeepers
1	GK	(Germany) GER	Nils Körber	0	0	0	0	0	0	0	0
21	GK	(Germany) GER	Timo Schlieck	9	0	9	0	0	0	0	0
26	GK	(Netherlands) NED	Pelle Boevink	11	0	10	0	1	0	0	0
43	GK	(Germany) GER	Silas Prüfrock	17	0	14	0	1	0	2	0
Defenders
2	DF	(Germany) GER	Lukas Reich	20	1	9+11	1	0	0	0	0
4	DF	(Germany) GER	Philipp Ziereis	31	0	27+2	0	0	0	2	0
5	DF	(Germany) GER	Reno Münz	27	0	24+3	0	0	0	0	0
15	DF	(Switzerland) SUI	Jan Elvedi	16	1	13+1	1	0	0	2	0
17	DF	(Germany) GER	Noah König	6	0	6	0	0	0	0	0
23	DF	(Germany) GER	Jannik Dehm	31	2	26+3	2	0	0	2	0
25	DF	(Iceland) ISL	Brynjar Ingi Bjarnason	17	1	10+6	1	0	0	0+1	0
27	DF	(Germany) GER	Gian-Luca Itter	21	0	15+4	0	0	0	2	0
33	DF	(United States) USA	Maximilian Dietz	23	0	22+1	0	0	0	0	0
38	DF	(Germany) GER	Raul Marita	5	0	0+5	0	0	0	0	0
40	DF	(Portugal) POR	David Abrangao	7	0	7	0	0	0	0	0
Midfielders
6	MF	(Burkina Faso) BFA	Sacha Bansé	1	0	0	0	0	0	1	0
8	MF	(Luxembourg) LUX	Mathias Olesen	12	0	10+2	0	0	0	0	0
13	MF	(Germany) GER	Paul Will	17	0	15	0	0	0	2	0
14	MF	(Germany) GER	Jomaine Consbruch	16	0	15+1	0	0	0	0	0
16	MF	(Switzerland) SUI	Aaron Keller	31	2	19+10	2	0	0	0+2	0
24	MF	(Germany) GER	Marco John	10	0	8+2	0	0	0	0	0
28	MF	(Kosovo) KOS	Doni Arifi	6	0	0+4	0	0	0	0+2	0
30	MF	(Germany) GER	Felix Klaus	28	8	25+1	8	0	0	2	0
37	MF	(United States) USA	Julian Green	22	0	11+11	0	0	0	0	0
47	MF	(Tunisia) TUN	Sayfallah Ltaief	9	0	4+3	0	0	0	2	0
Forwards
7	FW	(Germany) GER	Dennis Srbeny	25	3	21+2	3	0	0	1+1	0
9	FW	(Germany) GER	Noel Futkeu	35	20	30+3	19	0	0	2	1
10	FW	(Sweden) SWE	Branimir Hrgota	34	5	31+1	4	0	0	2	1
11	FW	(Luxembourg) LUX	Aiman Dardari	5	0	0+5	0	0	0	0	0
18	FW	(Germany) GER	Felix Higl	19	1	16+2	1	0	0	0+1	0
42	FW	(The Gambia) GAM	Omar Sillah	0	0	0	0	0	0	0	0
45	FW	(Portugal) POR	Keyan Varela	0	0	0	0	0	0	0	0
Players transferred out during the season
-	DF	(Germany) GER	Simon Asta	0	0	0	0	0	0	0	0

Last updated: 26 May 2026
Source: Competitions
