= Noel Futkeu =

German footballer (born 2002)

Personal information
- Date of birth: 6 December 2002 (age 23)
- Place of birth: Essen, Germany
- Height: 1.83 m (6 ft 0 in)
- Position: Striker

Team information
- Current team: SV Elversberg (on loan from Eintracht Frankfurt)
- Number: 9

Youth career
- –2018: Schwarz-Weiß Essen
- 2019–2020: Rot-Weiss Essen

Senior career*
Years	Team	Apps	(Gls)
2020	Rot-Weiss Essen	6	(1)
2021–2022	1. FC Köln II	17	(1)
2022–2023	Schwarz-Weiß Essen	32	(30)
2023	Eintracht Frankfurt	0	(0)
2023–2024	Eintracht Frankfurt II	27	(16)
2024–2026	Greuther Fürth	68	(30)
2026–	Eintracht Frankfurt	0	(0)
2026–	→ SV Elversberg (loan)	6	(0)
- * Club domestic league appearances and goals as of 24 October 2026

Noel Futkeu (born 6 December 2002) is a German professional footballer who plays as a striker for Bundesliga club SV Elversberg, on loan from Eintracht Frankfurt.

== Career ==
Futkeu started his career with Rot-Weiss Essen. He debuted for the club at the age of seventeen in January 2020. In 2021, he signed for 1. FC Köln II. He suffered a muscle injury while playing for the club. In 2022, he signed for Schwarz-Weiß Essen. He was regarded as one of the club's most important players. In 2023, he signed for Bundesliga side Eintracht Frankfurt, where he was initially earmarked for a place in the club's reserve team.

On 17 May 2024, 2. Bundesliga club Greuther Fürth confirmed that they had signed Futkeu ahead of the 2024–25 season. He signed a 'long-term contract'. During the 2025–26 season, he scored 19 goals in the 2. Bundesliga, finishing as the division's top scorer. Eintracht Frankfurt subsequently exercised their buy-back clause to re-sign Futkeu, before loaning him to newly promoted Bundesliga club SV Elversberg for the 2026–27 season.

== Personal life ==
Futkeu is of Cameroonian descent.

== Career statistics ==
As of match played 27 October 2026

Appearances and goals by club, season and competition
Club	Season	League			Cup		Europe		Other		Total	
Club	Season	Division	Apps	Goals	Apps	Goals	Apps	Goals	Apps	Goals	Apps	Goals
Rot-Weiss Essen	2019–20	Regionalliga West	4	1	—		—		0	0	4	1
Rot-Weiss Essen	2020–21	Regionalliga West	2	0	1	0	—		0	0	3	0
Rot-Weiss Essen	Total		6	1	1	0	—		0	0	7	1
1. FC Köln II	2020–21	Regionalliga West	8	0	—		—		—		8	0
1. FC Köln II	2021–22	Regionalliga West	9	1	—		—		—		9	1
1. FC Köln II	Total		17	1	—		—		—		17	1
Schwarz-Weiß Essen	2022–23	Oberliga Niederrhein	32	30	—		—		2 (Note: Appearances in Lower Rhine Cup)	2	34	32
Eintracht Frankfurt	2023–24	Bundesliga	0	0	1	0	0	0	—		1	0
Eintracht Frankfurt II	2023–24	Regionalliga Südwest	27	16	—		—		—		27	16
Greuther Fürth	2024–25	2. Bundesliga	34	11	0	0	—		—		34	11
Greuther Fürth	2025–26	2. Bundesliga	34	19	1	0	—		2 (Note: Appearances in promotion play-offs)	1	37	20
Greuther Fürth	Total		68	30	1	0	—		2	1	71	31
Eintracht Frankfurt	2026–27	Bundesliga	0	0	0	0	—		—		0	0
SV Elversberg (loan)	2026–27	Bundesliga	6	0	1	0	—		—		7	0
Career total			156	78	4	0	0	0	4	3	164	81
