= Reno Münz =

German footballer (born 2005)

Personal information
- Full name: Reno Morris Münz
- Date of birth: 2 October 2005 (age 21)
- Place of birth: Jakarta, Indonesia
- Height: 1.88 m (6 ft 2 in)
- Position: Centre-back

Team information
- Current team: Westerlo
- Number: 6

Youth career
- 2012–2022: Fortuna Köln
- 2022–2024: Bayer Leverkusen

Senior career*
Years	Team	Apps	(Gls)
2024–2026	Greuther Fürth II	3	(0)
2024–2026	Greuther Fürth	48	(0)
2026–	Westerlo	1	(0)

International career^{‡}
2023–2024	Germany U19	7	(0)
2025–	Germany U20	2	(0)
- * Club domestic league appearances and goals as of 16 August 2026 ‡ National team caps and goals as of 17 November 2025

Reno Morris Münz (German pronunciation: [ˈʁeːno mʏnts]; born 2 October 2005) is a professional footballer who plays as a centre-back for Belgian Pro League club Westerlo. Born in Indonesia, he has represented Germany at youth level internationally.

== Club career ==
Reno Münz started playing football at the age of seven at Fortuna Köln. He stayed there for ten years until he moved to Bayer Leverkusen on 1 July 2022. He made 33 appearances in the A-Junior Bundesliga and was nominated twice for the Bayer Leverkusen professional squad.

After two years with the Werkself, he moved to Greuther Fürth on 1 July 2024 (contract until 30 July 2027).

On 1 July 2026, Münz signed a four-season contract with Westerlo in Belgium.

== International career ==
On 6 September 2023, he made his debut in the Germany U-19 national football team jersey against England (1–0) and has played six more matches to date.

== Career statistics ==
As of matches played on 16 October 2026

Appearances and goals by club, season and competition
Club	Season	League			National Cup (Note: Includes DFB-Pokal, Belgian Cup)		Other		Total	
Club	Season	Division	Apps	Goals	Apps	Goals	Apps	Goals	Apps	Goals
Greuther Fürth II	2024–25	Regionalliga Bayern	2	0	—		—		2	0
Greuther Fürth II	2025–26	Regionalliga Bayern	1	0	—		—		1	0
Greuther Fürth II	Total		3	0	0	0	—		3	0
Greuther Fürth	2024–25	2. Bundesliga	20	0	1	0	—		21	0
Greuther Fürth	2025–26	2. Bundesliga	28	0	1	0	—		22	0
Greuther Fürth	Total		48	0	2	0	—		50	0
Westerlo	2026–27	Belgian Pro League	1	0	1	0	—		2	0
Career total			52	0	3	0	0	0	55	0
