= 2024–25 Holstein Kiel season =

Holstein Kiel
2024–25 season
- Manager: Marcel Rapp
- Stadium: Holstein-Stadion
- Bundesliga: 17th (relegated)
- DFB-Pokal: Second round
- Top goalscorer: League: Shuto Machino (11); All: Shuto Machino (12)
Home colours	Away colours	Third colours

The 2024–25 season was the 125th season in the history of Holstein Kiel and the first ever season in the Bundesliga. In addition to the domestic league, the team participated in the DFB-Pokal.

== Transfers ==
=== In ===
Pos.	Player	Transferred from	Fee	Date	Source
MF	(Germany) Andu Kelati	(Germany) 1899 Hoffenheim II	Free	1 July 2024	
DF	(Germany) Max Geschwill	(Germany) SV Sandhausen	Undisclosed	1 July 2024	
MF	(Norway) Magnus Knudsen	(Denmark) AGF	€1,500,000	1 July 2024	
MF	(Bosnia and Herzegovina) Armin Gigović	(Russia) Rostov	€1,800,000	23 July 2024	
MF	(Poland) Tymoteusz Puchacz	(Germany) Union Berlin	Undisclosed	2 August 2024	
MF	(Slovakia) Dominik Javorček	(Slovakia) Žilina	Loan	30 August 2024	
DF	(Slovenia) David Zec	(Slovenia) Celje	Undisclosed	1 January 2025	

=== Out ===
Pos.	Player	Transferred to	Fee	Date	Source
DF	(Germany) Tom Rothe	(Germany) Union Berlin	End of contract	1 July 2024	
MF	(Germany) Joshua Mees	(Germany) Preußen Münster	End of contract	1 July 2024	
FW	(Iceland) Hólmbert Friðjónsson	(Germany) Preußen Münster	End of contract	1 July 2024	
DF	(United States) Nico Carrera	(Mexico) Toluca	Undisclosed	9 July 2024	

== Friendlies ==
=== Pre-season ===
6 July 2024 Friendly	Holstein Kiel (Germany)	4–1	(Denmark) B.93
15:30	Arp 8'; Pichler 33'; Harres 50'; Kelati 64'		Nnamani 1'
Note: Two periods of 40 minutes. Match abandoned after 77 minutes due to bad weather.

12 July 2024 Friendly	Holstein Kiel (Germany)	0–0	(Denmark) Sønderjyske Fodbold	Germany
13:00

19 July 2024 Friendly	AB (Denmark)	1–0	(Germany) Holstein Kiel	Denmark
19:30

29 July 2024 Friendly	Borussia Mönchengladbach (Germany)	1–0	(Germany) Holstein Kiel	Rottach-Egern
18:00	Ranos 73'			Stadium: Sportplatz Birkenmoos

=== Mid-season ===
5 September 2024 Friendly	Hamburger SV (Germany)	0–1	(Germany) Holstein Kiel	Germany
13:00		Report	Harres 57'

10 October 2024 Friendly	Holstein Kiel (Germany)	5–0	(Denmark) Silkeborg	Kiel, Germany
13:00	Freundlich 5' (o.g.); Pichler 20'; Bernhardsson 22'; Erras 44'; Arp 55'			Stadium: Citti Fussball Park

5 January 2025 Friendly	Union Berlin (Germany)	1–2	(Germany) Holstein Kiel
13:00
Note: 4 x 30

20 March 2025 Friendly	Holstein Kiel (Germany)	2–2	(Germany) Eintracht Braunschweig
13:00

== Competitions ==
=== Overall record ===
Competition	First match	Last match	Starting round	Final position	Record							
Competition	First match	Last match	Starting round	Final position	Pld	W	D	L	GF	GA	GD	Win %
Bundesliga	24 August 2024	May 2025	Matchday 1	17th	34	6	7	21	49	80	−31	17.65
DFB-Pokal	17 August 2024	29 October 2024	First round	Second round	2	1	0	1	3	5	−2	50.00
Total					36	7	7	22	52	85	−33	19.44

Source: Competitions

=== Bundesliga ===
==== League table ====
Pos	Team	Pld	W	D	L	GF	GA	GD	Pts	Qualification or relegation
14	FC St. Pauli	34	8	8	18	28	41	−13	32	
15	TSG Hoffenheim	34	7	11	16	46	68	−22	32	
16	1. FC Heidenheim (O)	34	8	5	21	37	64	−27	29	Qualification for the relegation play-offs
17	Holstein Kiel (R)	34	6	7	21	49	80	−31	25	Relegation to 2. Bundesliga
18	VfL Bochum (R)	34	6	7	21	33	67	−34	25	Relegation to 2. Bundesliga

Source: Bundesliga
Rules for classification: 1) Points; 2) Goal difference; 3) Goals scored; 4) Head-to-head results; 5) Head-to-head away goals scored; 6) Away goals scored; 7) Play-off.
(Rules 4–6 only apply after home and away matches have been played between the tied teams.)
(O) Play-off winners; (R) Relegated

==== Results summary ====
Overall								Home						Away					
Pld	W	D	L	GF	GA	GD	Pts	W	D	L	GF	GA	GD	W	D	L	GF	GA	GD
34	6	7	21	49	80	−31	25	4	2	11	24	41	−17	2	5	10	25	39	−14

==== Results by round ====
Round	1	2	3	4	5	6	7	8	9	10	11	12	13	14	15	16	17	18	19	20	21	22	23	24	25	26	27	28	29	30	31	32	33	34
Ground	A	H	H	A	H	A	H	A	H	A	H	A	H	A	H	A	H	H	A	A	H	A	H	A	H	A	H	A	H	A	H	A	H	A
Result	L	L	L	D	L	D	L	L	W	L	L	L	L	L	W	L	W	L	D	L	D	L	L	W	D	L	L	D	L	D	W	W	L	L
Position	12	16	18	18	18	17	17	17	17	17	17	17	17	17	17	17	17	17	17	17	17	18	18	17	17	18	18	18	18	18	17	17	17	17

A = Away; H = Home; W = Win; D = Draw; L = Loss

==== Matches ====
The league schedule was released on 4 July 2024.

24 August 2024 1	TSG Hoffenheim	3–2	Holstein Kiel	Sinsheim
15:30	Kramarić 6' (pen.), 37', 87'	Report	Bernhardsson 63'; Kelati (red card) 82'; Machino 89'	Stadium: Rhein-Neckar-Arena; Attendance: 18,503; Referee: Tobias Stieler

31 August 2024 2	Holstein Kiel	0–2	VfL Wolfsburg	Kiel
15:30				Stadium: Holstein-Stadion

14 September 2024 3	Holstein Kiel	1–6	Bayern Munich	Kiel
18:30				Stadium: Holstein-Stadion

21 September 2024 4	VfL Bochum	2–2	Holstein Kiel	Bochum
15:30				Stadium: Ruhrstadion

29 September 2024 5	Holstein Kiel	2–4	Eintracht Frankfurt	Kiel
20:30	Machino 30' (pen.), 50'; Porath (yellow card) 51'		O.Marmoush 25', 65'; A.Amenda (yellow card) 35'; I.Matanovic 47'; R.Koch (yellow card) 70'; Lucas Melo 74'; H.Larsson (yellow card) 80'	Stadium: Holstein-Stadion

5 October 2024 6	Bayer Leverkusen	2–2	Holstein Kiel	Leverkusen
15:30 CEST (UTC+2)	Boniface 4'; Hofmann 8'; Frimpong (yellow card) 68'; Tah (yellow card) 90+6'	Report	Geschwill 45+5'; Knudsen (yellow card) 60'; Arp 69' (pen.); Weiner (yellow card) 90+2'	Stadium: BayArena; Attendance: 30,210; Referee: Robert Hartmann

20 October 2024 7	Holstein Kiel	0–2	Union Berlin	Kiel
15:30	Komenda (yellow card) 66'; Remberg (yellow card) 79'	Report	Kemlein 18'; Rönnow (yellow card) 73'; Rothe 89'	Stadium: Holstein-Stadion; Attendance: 15,034; Referee: Timo Gerach

26 October 2024 8	VfB Stuttgart	2–1	Holstein Kiel	Stuttgart
15:30 CEST (UTC+2)	Undav 19'; Vagnoman (yellow card) 49'; Touré 61'; Chabot (yellow card) 63' (yellow-red card) 66'	Report	Schulz (yellow card) 31'; Remberg (yellow card) 66'; Gigović (yellow card) 71', (goal) 84'; Geschwill (yellow card) 80'; Arp (yellow card) 81' (yellow-red card) 88'	Stadium: MHPArena; Attendance: 59,000; Referee: Robert Hartmann

9 November 2024 9	Holstein Kiel	1–0	1. FC Heidenheim	Kiel
15:30	P. Erras 28'; A.Gigović (yellow card) 35'; N.Remberg (yellow card) 38'; F.Porath (yellow card) 59'	Report	T.Siersleben (yellow card) 17'; B.Gimber (yellow card) 32'; P.Mainka (yellow card) 67'; J.Schöppner (yellow card) 70'; M.Pieringer (yellow card) 76'; M.Knudsen (yellow card) 83'	Stadium: Holstein-Stadion; Attendance: 4,405; Referee: Frank Willenborg

9 November 2024 10	Werder Bremen	2–1	Holstein Kiel	Bremen
15:30	Jens Stage 36'; Oliver Burke 89'	Report	Phil Harres 48'	Stadium: Weserstadion; Attendance: 14.405; Referee: Sören Storks

24 November 2024 11	Holstein Kiel	0–3	Mainz 05	Kiel
15:30		Report	Nadiem Amiri 11'; Jonathan Burkardt 37'; Jae-sung Lee 53'	Stadium: Holstein-Stadion; Referee: Sascha Stegemann

29 November 2024 12	FC St. Pauli	3–1	Holstein Kiel	Hamburg
20:30		Report		Stadium: Millerntor-Stadion

7 December 2024 13	Holstein Kiel	0–2	RB Leipzig	Kiel
15:30 CET (UTC+1)	Gigović (yellow card) 35'; Weiner (yellow card) 67'; Schulz (yellow card) 68'; Bernhardsson (yellow card) 90'	Report	Šeško 27'; Openda (yellow card) 56'; Silva 69' (pen.); Vermeeren (yellow card) 74'; Henrichs (yellow card) 83'	Stadium: Holstein-Stadion; Attendance: 14,715; Referee: Florian Badstübner

14 December 2024 14	Borussia Mönchengladbach	4–1	Holstein Kiel	Mönchengladbach
15:30	Kleindienst 1'; Hack 26'; Pléa 43', 79'; Scally (yellow card) 69'	Report	Gigović 30'; Remberg (yellow card) 77'	Stadium: Borussia-Park; Attendance: 52,210; Referee: Daniel Schlager

21 December 2024 15	Holstein Kiel	5–1	FC Augsburg	Kiel
15:30 CET (UTC+1)	Rosenboom 12'; Harres 32', 35'; Machino 39', 90+1'	Report	Claude-Maurice 5'; Wolf (yellow card) 29'; Giannoulis (yellow card) 67'	Stadium: Holstein-Stadion; Attendance: 14,830; Referee: Tobias Welz

11 January 2025 16	SC Freiburg	3–2	Holstein Kiel	Freiburg
15:30 CET (UTC+1)	Remberg 23' (o.g.); Günter 38'; Kübler (yellow card) 58'; Grifo 74'; Gregoritsch (yellow card) 90+5'	Report	Harres (yellow card) 37', (goal) 85', 90'; Gigović (yellow card) 45+2'; Javorček (yellow card) 90+5'	Stadium: Europa-Park Stadion; Attendance: 33,700; Referee: Sören Storks

14 January 2025 17	Holstein Kiel	4–2	Borussia Dortmund	Kiel
18:30 CET (UTC+1)	Machino 27'; Harres 32'; Bernhardsson 45+4'; Porath (yellow card) 82'; Holtby (red card) 86'; Arp 90+9', (yellow card) 90+10'	Report	Duranville (yellow card) 42'; Reyna 72'; Gittens 78'; Anton (yellow card) 86'	Attendance: 15,034; Referee: Martin Petersen

18 January 2025 18	Holstein Kiel	1–3	Hoffenheim	Kiel
18:30 CET (UTC+1)	Knudsen (yellow card) 53'; Kelati 84'; Weiner (yellow card) 87'	Report	Chaves (yellow card) 23'; Hložek 26', 56'; Kramarić 45+1'	Attendance: 13,923; Referee: Felix Brych

24 January 2025 19	VfL Wolfsburg	2–2	Holstein Kiel	Wolfsburg
20:30 CET (UTC+1)	Wimmer 50', (yellow card) 60'; Wind 53'; Mæhle (yellow card) 90+1'	Report	Zec 13', (yellow card) 23'; Skrzybski 80'; Remberg (yellow card) 90+1'; Arp (yellow card) 90+2'; Pichler (yellow card) 90+4'	Stadium: Volkswagen Arena; Attendance: 22,103; Referee: Sven Jablonski

1 February 2025 20	Bayern Munich	4–3	Holstein Kiel	Munich
15:30 CET (UTC+1)	Musiala 19'; Kane 45+2', 46'; Gnabry 54'; Laimer (yellow card) 78'	Report	Porath 62'; Zec (yellow card) 81'; Skrzybski 90+1', 90+3'	Stadium: Allianz Arena; Attendance: 75,000; Referee: Florian Exner

9 February 2025 21	Holstein Kiel	2–2	VfL Bochum	Kiel
15:30 CET (UTC+1)	Skrzybski 3' (pen.); Zec 50', (yellow card) 90+5'; Remberg (yellow card) 52'	Report	Boadu 37', 39'; Wittek (yellow card) 54'; Bero (yellow card) 68'	Stadium: Holstein-Stadion; Attendance: 15,034; Referee: Felix Zwayer

16 February 2025 22	Eintracht Frankfurt	3–1	Holstein Kiel	Frankfurt
17:30 CET (UTC+1)	Larsson 18'; Tuta 37'; Uzun 60'; Dahoud (yellow card) 62'; Kristensen (yellow card) 85'	Report	Porath 73'	Stadium: Deutsche Bank Park; Attendance: 57,700; Referee: Robert Hartmann

22 February 2025 23	Holstein Kiel	0–2	Bayer 04 Leverkusen	Kiel
15:30 CET (UTC+1)	Knudsen (yellow card) 12'; Zec (yellow card) 24'; Javorček (yellow card) 75'; Komenda (yellow card) 82'	Report	Schick 9'; Adli 45'; Hincapié (yellow card) 78'	Stadium: Holstein-Stadion; Attendance: 15,034; Referee: Daniel Schlager

2 March 2025 24	Union Berlin	0–1	Holstein Kiel	Berlin
15:30 CET (UTC+1)	Rothe (yellow card) 40'; Ljubičić (yellow card) 45+3'; Volland (yellow card) 77'; Juranović (yellow card) 90+5'	Report	Gigović 43'	Stadium: Stadion An der Alten Försterei; Attendance: 22,012; Referee: Tobias Reichel

8 March 2025 25	Holstein Kiel	2–2	VfB Stuttgart	Kiel
15:30 CET (UTC+1)	Skrzybski 30', 46'; Remberg (yellow card) 83'	Report	Millot (yellow card) 8'; Leweling 15', (yellow card) 90+1'; Stergiou (red card) 53'; Demirović 55'	Stadium: Holstein-Stadion; Attendance: 15,034; Referee: Bastian Dankert

16 March 2025 26	1. FC Heidenheim	3–1	Holstein Kiel	Heidenheim
17:30 CET (UTC+1)	Pieringer 33'; Zivzivadze 47'; Traoré (yellow card) 57'; Conteh 90+3'	Report	Komenda (yellow card) 54'; Harres (yellow card) 78', (goal) 87'; Arp (yellow card) 85'	Stadium: Voith-Arena; Attendance: 15,000; Referee: Harm Osmers

29 March 2025 27	Holstein Kiel	0–3	Werder Bremen	Kiel
15:30 CET (UTC+1)	Rosenboom (yellow card) 16'; Remberg (yellow card) 24'; Ivezić (yellow card) 26'; Bernhardsson (yellow card) 52'	Report	Ducksch 25'; Agu 59'; Stage (yellow card) 82'; Grüll 90+3'	Stadium: Holstein-Stadion; Attendance: 15,034; Referee: Sascha Stegemann

5 April 2025 28	Mainz 05	1–1	Holstein Kiel	Mainz
15:30 CEST (UTC+2)	Mwene (yellow card) 33'; Weiper 75'; Jenz (yellow card) 84'; Amiri (yellow card) 90+1'	Report	Bernhardsson 34'; Zec (yellow card) 44'; Remberg (yellow card) 51'; Becker (yellow card) 85'; Rosenboom (yellow card) 90+1'	Stadium: Mewa Arena; Attendance: 32,500; Referee: Frank Willenborg

12 April 2025 29	Holstein Kiel	1–2	FC St. Pauli	Kiel
15:30 CEST (UTC+2)	Bernhardsson 21'; Ivezić (yellow card) 60'; Harres (yellow card) 77'; Schulz (yellow card) 86'	Report	Sinani 34'; Nemeth (yellow card) 37'; Afolayan (yellow card) 46'; Wahl (yellow card) 82'; Geschwill 90+2' (o.g.); Guilavogui (yellow card) 90+3'	Stadium: Holstein-Stadion; Attendance: 15,034; Referee: Benjamin Brand

19 April 2025 30	RB Leipzig	1–1	Holstein Kiel	Leipzig
15:30 CEST (UTC+2)	Klostermann (yellow card) 41'; Šeško 74' (pen.)	Report	Rosenboom (yellow card) 29'; Machino 44'; Arp (yellow card) 90+8'	Stadium: Red Bull Arena; Attendance: 45,940; Referee: Felix Brych

26 April 2025 31	Holstein Kiel	4–3	Borussia Mönchengladbach	Kiel
15:30 CEST (UTC+2)	Machino 15', 90+1', (yellow card) 83'; Bernhardsson 23'; Gigović 76'; Ivezić (yellow card) 84'	Report	Čvančara (yellow card) 37', (goal) 60'; Pléa 69'; Honorat 86'	Stadium: Holstein-Stadion; Attendance: 15,034; Referee: Robert Hartmann

4 May 2025 32	FC Augsburg	1–3	Holstein Kiel	Augsburg
15:30 CEST (UTC+2)	Mounié 90'	Report	Machino 25' (pen.); Bernhardsson 40', 51'; Arp (yellow card) 85'; Remberg (yellow card) 90+4'	Stadium: WWK Arena; Attendance: 28,660; Referee: Harm Osmers

10 May 2025 33	Holstein Kiel	1–2	SC Freiburg	Kiel
15:30 CEST (UTC+2)	Rosenboom 24'; Gigović (yellow card) 69'	Report	Manzambi 45+2'; Höler 58'	Stadium: Holstein-Stadion; Attendance: 15,034; Referee: Robert Schröder

17 May 2025 34	Borussia Dortmund	3–0	Holstein Kiel	Dortmund
15:30 CEST (UTC+2)	Guirassy 3' (pen.); Sabitzer 47', (yellow card) 90'; Adeyemi (yellow card) 56'; Nmecha 73'; Gittens (yellow card) 87'	Report	Johansson (red card) 9'; Remberg (yellow card) 87'	Stadium: Signal Iduna Park; Attendance: 81,365; Referee: Harm Osmers

=== DFB-Pokal ===
17 August 2024 First round	Alemannia Aachen	2–3	Holstein Kiel	Aachen
18:00 CEST (UTC+2)	Hanraths 28'; Benschop 60'	Report	Machino 16'; Rosenboom 82', 90+1'	Stadium: Tivoli; Attendance: 29,555; Referee: Michael Bacher

29 October 2024 Second round	1. FC Köln	3–0	Holstein Kiel	Cologne
20:45	Lemperle 8'; Waldschmidt 84', 90+7'	Report		Stadium: RheinEnergieStadion; Attendance: 50,000; Referee: Bastian Dankert
