= Phil Harres =

German footballer (born 2002)

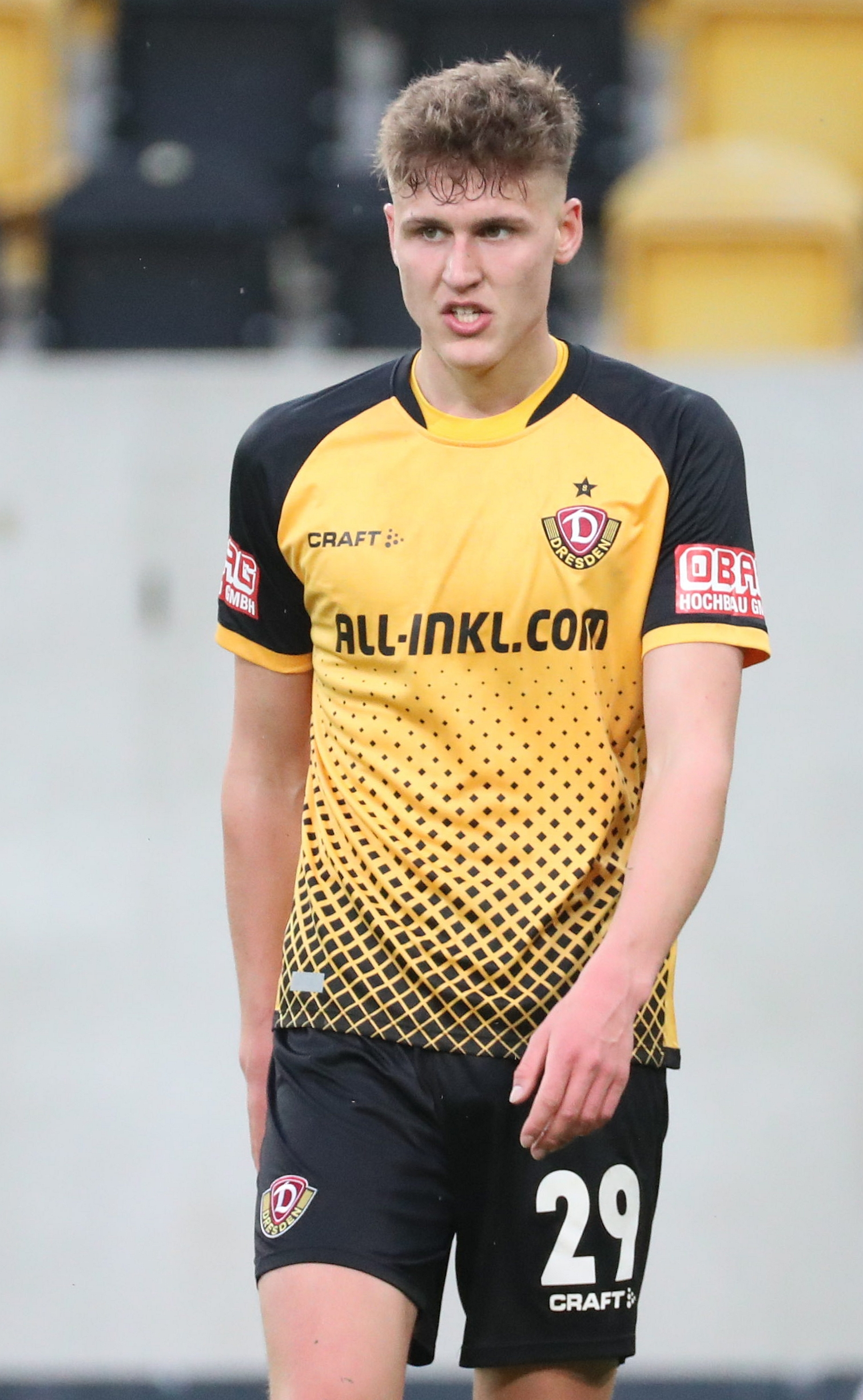
- Harres with Dynamo Dresden in 2021

Personal information
- Date of birth: 25 March 2002 (age 24)
- Place of birth: Datteln, Germany
- Height: 1.93 m (6 ft 4 in)
- Position: Forward

Team information
- Current team: Holstein Kiel
- Number: 19

Youth career
- Borussia Dortmund
- –2017: VfL Bochum
- 2017–2018: Hombrucher SV 09/72
- 2018–2019: Preußen Münster
- 2019–2021: Dynamo Dresden

Senior career*
Years	Team	Apps	(Gls)
2021–2022	Dynamo Dresden	1	(0)
2021–2022	→ SSV Ulm (loan)	34	(8)
2022–2023	Viktoria Berlin	28	(8)
2023–2024	FC Homburg	34	(24)
2024–	Holstein Kiel	59	(18)
2024–	Holstein Kiel II	7	(3)
- * Club domestic league appearances and goals as of 18 May 2026

Phil Harres (born 25 March 2002) is a German professional footballer who plays as a forward for Holstein Kiel.

== Career ==
As a youth player, Harres joined the youth academy of Bundesliga side Borussia Dortmund. Stints at the youth academies of VfL Bochum, Hombrucher SV 09/72, Preußen Münster, and Dynamo Dresden followed, starting his senior career with the latter before being sent on loan from the club to SSV Ulm in 2021.

In 2022, he signed for Viktoria Berlin. One year later, he signed for FC Homburg. His form while playing for the club earned him a move to Bundesliga side Holstein Kiel in 2024. On 9 November 2024, he scored his first goal for the club during a 2–1 away loss to Werder Bremen in the league.

== Style of play ==
Being right-footed, Harres can play as a right winger on top of playing as a forward. German newspaper Dattelner Morgenpost wrote that he is known for his "robustness and deep runs, which make it difficult for opponents to defend him".

== Career statistics ==
As of match played 17 May 2025

Appearances and goals by club, season and competition
Club	Season	League			DFB-Pokal		Other		Total	
Club	Season	Division	Apps	Goals	Apps	Goals	Apps	Goals	Apps	Goals
Dynamo Dresden	2020–21	3. Liga	0	0	0	0	2 (Note: Appearances in Saxony Cup)	0	2	0
Dynamo Dresden	2022–23	3. Liga	1	0	0	0	—		1	0
Dynamo Dresden	Total		1	0	0	0	2	0	3	0
SSV Ulm (loan)	2021–22	Regionalliga Südwest	34	8	1	0	6 (Note: Appearances in Württemberg Cup)	9	41	17
Viktoria Berlin	2022–23	Regionalliga Nordost	28	8	0	0	6 (Note: Appearances in Berlin Cup)	4	34	12
FC Homburg	2023–24	Regionalliga Südwest	34	24	3	2	5 (Note: Appearances in Saarland Cup)	2	42	28
Holstein Kiel	2024–25	Bundesliga	26	8	1	0	—		27	8
Holstein Kiel II (loan)	2024–25	Regionalliga Nord	7	3	—		—		7	3
Career total			130	51	5	2	19	15	154	68
