= Lukas Reich =

German footballer (born 2006)

Personal information
- Date of birth: 24 October 2006 (age 20)
- Place of birth: Erding, Germany
- Height: 1.79 m (5 ft 10 in)
- Position: Right-back

Team information
- Current team: Greuther Fürth
- Number: 2

Youth career
- –2016: FC Forstern
- 2016–2024: 1860 Munich

Senior career*
Years	Team	Apps	(Gls)
2024–2025	1860 Munich	35	(1)
2025–	Greuther Fürth	24	(1)

International career^{‡}
2022	Germany U16	2	(0)
2023–2024	Germany U18	4	(0)
2024–2025	Germany U19	6	(0)
2025–	Germany U20	2	(0)
- * Club domestic league appearances and goals as of 22:51, 29 August 2026 (UTC) ‡ National team caps and goals as of 22:51, 29 August 2026 (UTC)

Lukas Reich (born 24 October 2006) is a German professional footballer who plays as a right-back for 2. Bundesliga club Greuther Fürth.

== Early life ==
Reich was born in Erding, Bavaria, on 24 October 2006.

== Club career ==
Reich played youth football for FC Forstern until 2016, and then for 1860 Munich until making his first team debut for the club in April 2024. He had extended his contract with the club in December 2023. He scored once in 35 appearances for the club.

In May 2025, he signed for 2. Bundesliga club Greuther Fürth on a three-year contract for a fee of €500,000.

== International career ==
He has represented Germany at under-16, under-18, under-19 and under-20 levels. He made his debut for Germany under-18 in November 2023.
