= Marko Ivezić =

Serbian footballer (born 2001)

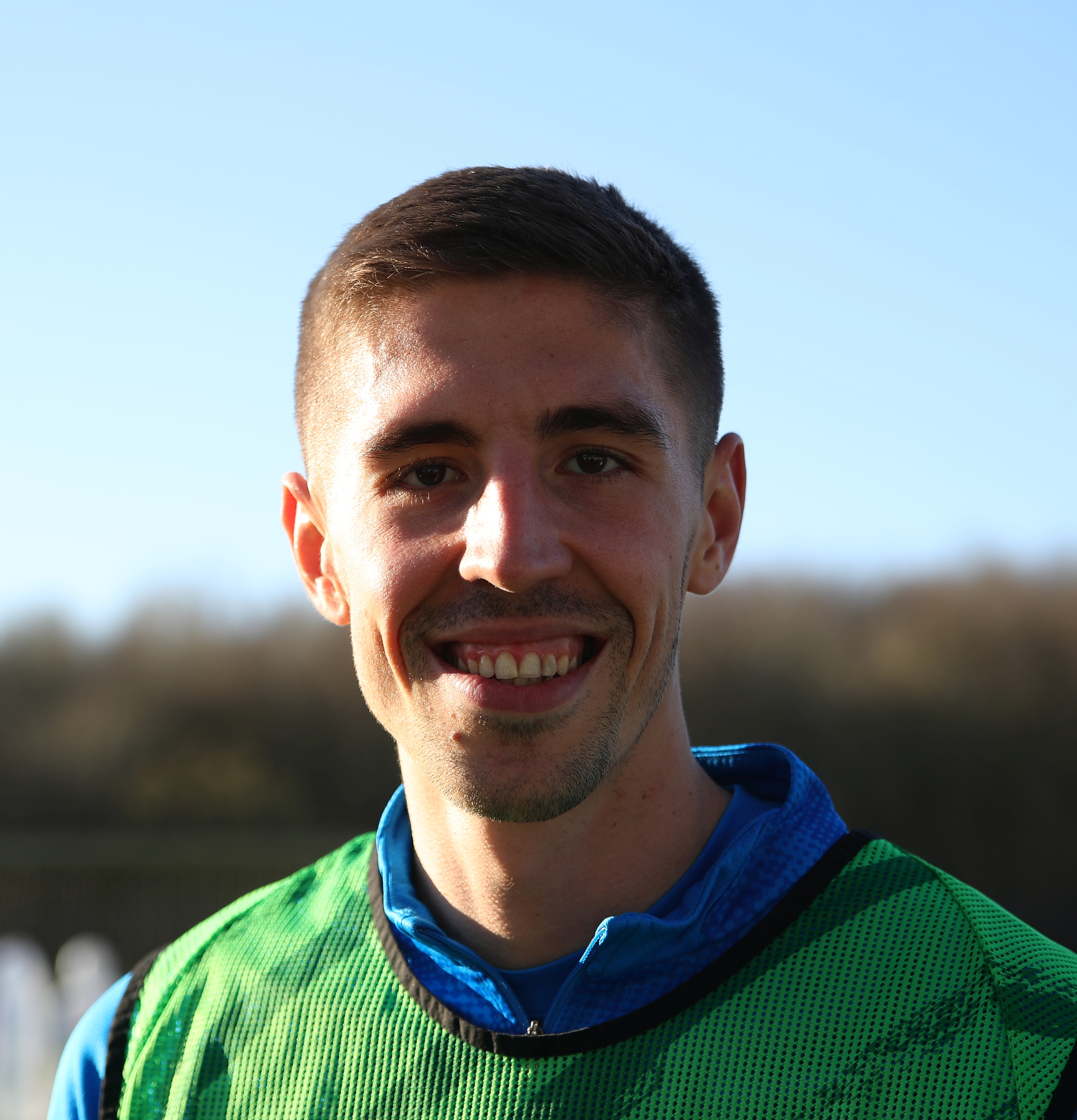
- Ivezić in 2026

Personal information
- Date of birth: 2 December 2001 (age 24)
- Place of birth: FR Yugoslavia
- Height: 1.91 m (6 ft 3 in)
- Positions: Defender; defensive midfielder

Team information
- Current team: Hibernian

Youth career
- 2019–2021: Voždovac

Senior career*
Years	Team	Apps	(Gls)
2021–2023	Voždovac	68	(3)
2023–2026	Holstein Kiel	79	(1)
2026–	Hibernian	0	(0)

International career^{‡}
2022	Serbia U21	4	(0)
2023–	Serbia	1	(0)
- * Club domestic league appearances and goals as of 18 May 2026 ‡ National team caps and goals as of 25 January 2023

Marko Ivezić (Serbian Cyrillic: Марко Ивезић; born 2 December 2001) is a Serbian professional footballer who plays as a defensive midfielder for Scottish club Hibernian. He has previously played for Voždovac and German club Holstein Kiel.

== International career ==
Ivezić made his debut for Serbia national team on 25 January 2023 in a friendly match against USA. Serbia won the game 2–1, with Ivezić coming on in the second half as a substitute.

== Career statistics ==
=== Club ===
As of 18 May 2026

Appearances and goals by club, season and competition
Club	Season	League			Cup		Other		Total	
Club	Season	League	Apps	Goals	Apps	Goals	Apps	Goals	Apps	Goals
Voždovac	2020–21	Serbian SuperLiga	5	0	1	0	—		6	0
Voždovac	2021–22	Serbian SuperLiga	34	3	1	0	—		35	3
Voždovac	2022–23	Serbian SuperLiga	29	0	1	0	—		30	0
Voždovac	Total		68	3	3	0	—		71	3
Holstein Kiel	2023–24	2. Bundesliga	29	1	2	0	—		31	1
Holstein Kiel	2024–25	Bundesliga	23	0	2	0	—		25	0
Holstein Kiel	2025–26	2. Bundesliga	27	0	3	0	—		30	0
Holstein Kiel	Total		79	1	7	0	—		86	1
Career total			147	4	10	0	0	0	157	4

=== International ===
As of 25 January 2023

Appearances and goals by national team and year
National team	Year	Apps	Goals
Serbia	2023	1	0
Total		1	0
