= Lasse Rosenboom =

German footballer (born 2002)

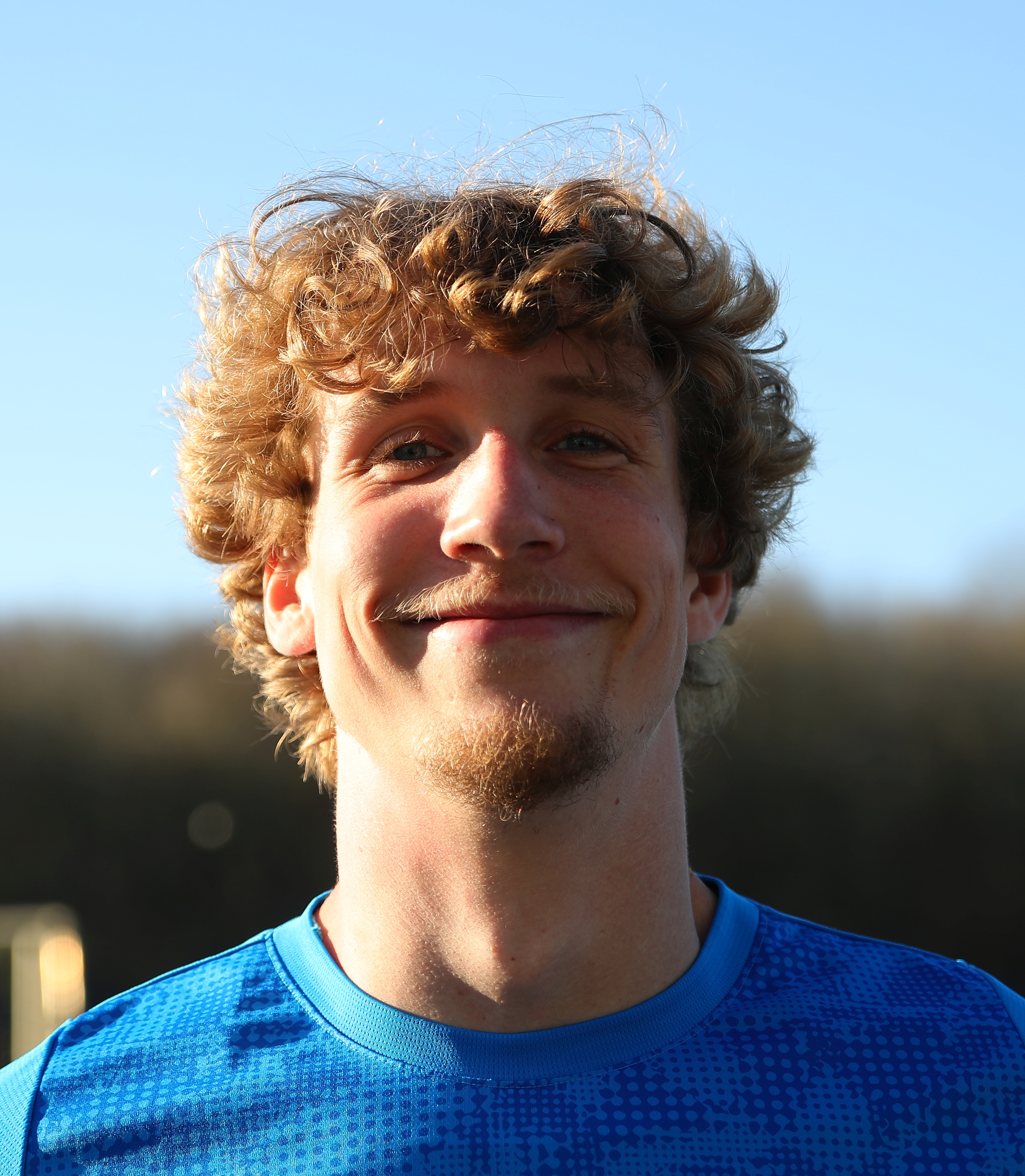
- Rosenboom in 2026

Personal information
- Date of birth: 19 January 2002 (age 24)
- Place of birth: Aurich, Germany
- Height: 1.90 m (6 ft 3 in)
- Position: Defender

Team information
- Current team: Holstein Kiel
- Number: 23

Youth career
- –2015: TuS Holtriem
- 2015–2016: JFV Norden
- 2016–2017: JFV Nordwest
- 2017–2021: Werder Bremen

Senior career*
Years	Team	Apps	(Gls)
2021–2023	Werder Bremen II	52	(2)
2023–	Holstein Kiel	67	(3)
2023–	Holstein Kiel II	18	(2)

International career^{‡}
2018	Germany U16	2	(0)
2018–2019	Germany U17	8	(0)
2021–2022	Germany U20	6	(0)
- * Club domestic league appearances and goals as of 18 May 2026 ‡ National team caps and goals as of 20 November 2024

Lasse Rosenboom (born 19 January 2002) is a German professional footballer who plays as a defender for 2. Bundesliga club Holstein Kiel.

== Club career ==
As a youth player, Rosenboom joined the youth academy of TuS Holtriem. Stints at the youth academies of JFV Norden and JFV Nordwest followed, before he joined the youth academy of Bundesliga side Werder Bremen at the age of fifteen. He started his senior career with the club's reserve team, making fifty-two league appearances and scoring two goals. However, he suffered relegation to the fifth tier while playing for them. In 2023, he signed for German 2. Bundesliga side Holstein Kiel, helping the club achieve promotion to the Bundesliga.

== International career ==
From 2018 to 2019, Rosenboom played for the Germany national under-16 football team and the Germany national under-17 football team. Altogether, he made ten appearances while playing for the Germany national under-16 football team and the Germany national under-17 football team, including at the 2019 UEFA European Under-17 Championship, where Germany was unable to reach the knockout stage.

== Career statistics ==
As of match played 17 May 2025

Appearances and goals by club, season and competition
Club	Season	League			DFB-Pokal		Total	
Club	Season	Division	Apps	Goals	Apps	Goals	Apps	Goals
Werder Bremen II	2021–22	Regionalliga Nord	25	1	—		25	1
Werder Bremen II	2022–23	Regionalliga Nord	27	1	—		27	1
Werder Bremen II	Total		52	2	—		52	2
Holstein Kiel	2023–24	2. Bundesliga	11	0	0	0	11	0
Holstein Kiel	2024–25	Bundesliga	26	2	2	2	28	4
Holstein Kiel	Total		37	2	2	2	39	4
Holstein Kiel II	2023–24	Regionalliga Nord	14	0	—		14	0
Holstein Kiel II	2024–25	Regionalliga Nord	4	2	—		4	2
Holstein Kiel II	Total		18	2	—		18	2
Career total			96	6	2	2	98	8
