= Doni Arifi =

Finnish footballer (born 2002)

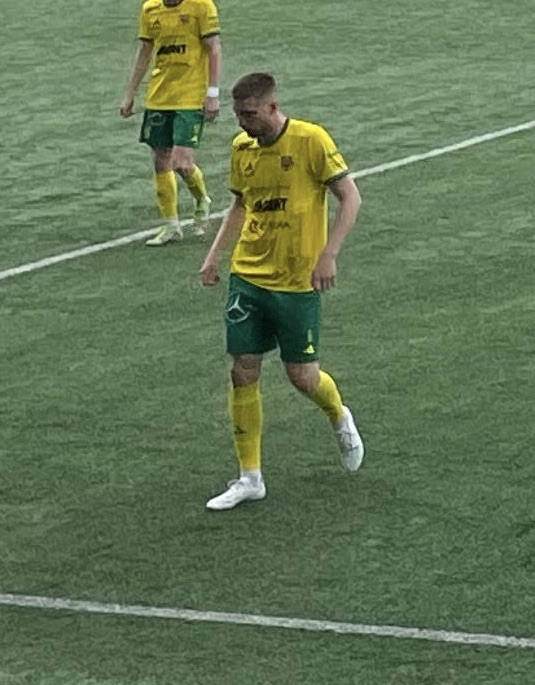
- Arifi with Ilves in 2024

Personal information
- Date of birth: 11 April 2002 (age 24)
- Place of birth: Riihimäki, Finland
- Height: 1.95 m (6 ft 5 in)
- Position: Midfielder

Team information
- Current team: Greuther Fürth
- Number: 28

Senior career*
Years	Team	Apps	(Gls)
2018–2020	Honka	0	(0)
2018–2020	Honka II	31	(0)
2020	Ilves II	1	(0)
2020–2024	Ilves	89	(3)
2025	KuPS	29	(1)
2026–	Greuther Fürth	12	(1)

International career^{‡}
2018	Finland U17	5	(0)
2019	Finland U18	2	(0)
2021	Finland U20	2	(0)
2023	Kosovo U21	2	(0)
2024–2025	Finland U21	6	(0)
2026–	Finland	2	(0)
- * Club domestic league appearances and goals as of 18 May 2026 ‡ National team caps and goals as of 30 March 2026

Doni Arifi (born 11 April 2002) is a Finnish professional footballer who plays as a midfielder for 2. Bundesliga club Greuther Fürth and the Finland national team.

== Club career ==
Arifi was born in Riihimäki but raised in Matinkylä, Espoo. He started to play football in FC Honka organisation, debuting in senior level with the club's reserve team in the third-tier Kakkonen in 2018.

In the early 2020, Arifi moved to Tampere and joined a fellow Veikkausliiga side Ilves. On 7 August 2021, he extended his contract with Ilves, on a deal until the end of 2024. He missed most of the 2023 season due to injury, but contributed in four cup matches as Ilves won the 2023 Finnish Cup title.

In January 2025, Arifi left Ilves and signed with KuPS.

On 3 January 2026, Arifi signed a one-and-a-half-year contract with Greuther Fürth in German 2. Bundesliga.

== International career ==
Born and raised in Finland, Arifi is a former youth international for the country, before switching his allegiance to Kosovo at under-21 level in 2023. In August 2024, Arifi stated in an interview that he was still open to represent the country from which he receives the first full international call-up. He respected Finland where he was born and raised and educated as a player, and Kosovo as his parents' home country.

On 28 August 2024, Arifi was called up to the Finland U21 squad by the head coach Mika Lehkosuo, for the 2025 UEFA European Under-21 Championship qualification matches against Armenia and Romania. He made his under-21 debut for Finland on 6 September against Armenia. Eventually Arifi made four appearances in the qualifiers, in which Finland advanced to the final competition by defeating Norway in the play-offs. Arifi was later named in Finland's final squad for the tournament in June 2025, as a replacement for Leo Walta.

== Personal life ==
Arifi was born in Riihimäki, Finland to ethnic Albanian parents from Mitrovica.

== Career statistics ==
As of 18 May 2026

Appearances and goals by club, season and competition
Club	Season	League			National cup (Note: Includes Suomen Cup)		League cup		Europe		Total	
Club	Season	Division	Apps	Goals	Apps	Goals	Apps	Goals	Apps	Goals	Apps	Goals
Honka	2018	Veikkausliiga	0	0	1	0	–		–		1	0
Honka	2019	Veikkausliiga	0	0	4	0	–		–		4	0
Honka	Total		0	0	5	0	0	0	0	0	5	0
Honka Akatemia	2018	Kakkonen	14	0	–		–		–		14	0
Honka Akatemia	2019	Kakkonen	16	0	–		–		–		16	0
Honka Akatemia	2020	Kakkonen	1	0	1	1	–		–		2	1
Honka Akatemia	Total		31	0	1	1	0	0	0	0	32	1
Ilves II	2020	Kakkonen	1	0	–		–		–		1	0
Ilves	2020	Veikkausliiga	9	0	0	0	–		1 (Note: Appearances UEFA Europa League)	0	10	0
Ilves	2021	Veikkausliiga	23	0	3	0	–		–		26	0
Ilves	2022	Veikkausliiga	26	0	2	0	4	0	–		32	0
Ilves	2023	Veikkausliiga	8	0	4	0	5	0	–		17	0
Ilves	2024	Veikkausliiga	23	3	1	0	6	0	4 (Note: Appearances UEFA Conference League)	0	34	3
Ilves	Total		89	3	10	0	15	0	5	0	119	3
KuPS	2025	Veikkausliiga	29	1	3	0	4	0	14 (Note: Appearances in UEFA Champions League, UEFA Europa League and UEFA Europa Conference League)	0	50	1
Greuther Fürth	2025–26	2. Bundesliga	12	1	–		–		–		12	1
Career total			162	5	19	1	19	0	19	0	219	6

=== International ===
As of match played 30 March 2026

National team	Year	Competitive		Friendly		Total	
National team	Year	Apps	Goals	Apps	Goals	Apps	Goals
Finland	2026	0 (Note: Appearances in the 2026–27 UEFA Nations League C.)	0	2 (Note: Includes two appearances in the 2026 FIFA Series.)	0	2	0
Total		0	0	2	0	2	0

== Honours ==
KuPS

- Veikkausliiga: 2025

Ilves

- Veikkausliiga runner-up: 2024
- Finnish Cup: 2023

Finland

- FIFA Series: 2026
