= Andu Kelati =

German footballer (born 2002)

Andu Kelat
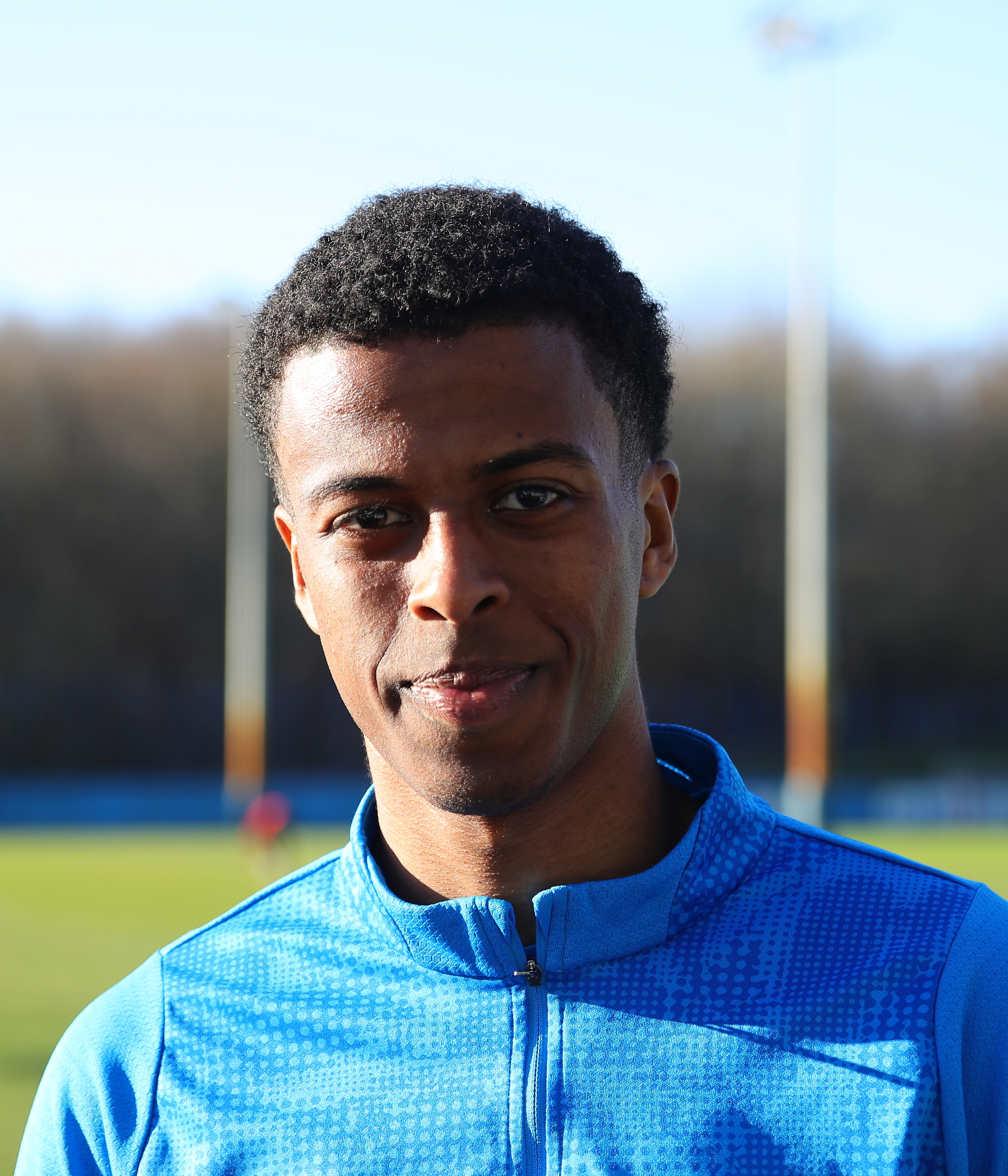
- Kelati in 2026

Personal information
- Full name: Andu Yobel Kelati
- Date of birth: 13 August 2002 (age 24)
- Place of birth: Frankfurt, Germany
- Height: 1.79 m (5 ft 10 in)
- Positions: Midfielder; winger

Team information
- Current team: Holstein Kiel
- Number: 16

Youth career
- –2020: FSV Frankfurt

Senior career*
Years	Team	Apps	(Gls)
2020–2022	FSV Frankfurt	44	(2)
2022–2024	TSG 1899 Hoffenheim II	65	(19)
2024–	Holstein Kiel	14	(0)
- * Club domestic league appearances and goals as of 18 May 2026

Andu Yobel Kelati (born 13 August 2002) is a German professional footballer who plays as a midfielder or winger for Holstein Kiel.

== Early life ==
Kelati was born on 13 August 2002 in Frankfurt, Germany and is a native of the city. Born to Eritrean parents, he has an older sister and is the twin brother of German footballer Yeman Kelati.

== Career ==
At the age of nine, Kelati joined the youth academy of FSV Frankfurt, where he started his senior career. Altogether, he made forty-four league appearances and scored two goals while playing for the club.

In 2022, he signed for TSG 1899 Hoffenheim II, the reserve team of Bundesliga side TSG 1899 Hoffenheim, where he made sixty-five league appearances and scored nineteen goals. In addition, he trained with the first team while playing for them. Two years later, he signed for Bundesliga side Holstein Kiel. On 21 September 2024, he made his first start for the club during a 2–2 away draw with VfL Bochum in the league.

== Career statistics ==
As of match played 17 May 2025

Appearances and goals by club, season and competition
Club	Season	League			DFB-Pokal		Other		Total	
Club	Season	League	Apps	Goals	Apps	Goals	Apps	Goals	Apps	Goals
FSV Frankfurt	2019–20	Regionalliga Südwest	1	0	—		—		1	0
FSV Frankfurt	2020–21	Regionalliga Südwest	23	1	—		2 (Note: Appearances in Hessian Cup)	1	25	1
FSV Frankfurt	2021–22	Regionalliga Südwest	20	1	—		2 (Note: name+HC)	0	22	1
FSV Frankfurt	Total		44	2	—		4	1	48	2
1899 Hoffenheim II	2022–23	Regionalliga Südwest	31	8	—		2 (Note: Appearances in MLS Next Pro)	0	33	8
1899 Hoffenheim II	2023–24	Regionalliga Südwest	34	11	—		—		34	11
1899 Hoffenheim II	Total		65	19	—		2	0	67	19
Holstein Kiel	2024–25	Bundesliga	8	0	1	0	—		9	0
Career total			117	21	1	0	6	1	124	22
