= Alexander Bernhardsson =

Swedish footballer (born 1998)

- Bernhardsson with Sweden in 2026

Personal information
- Full name: Alexander Olof Bernhardsson
- Date of birth: 8 September 1998 (age 28)
- Place of birth: Gothenburg, Sweden
- Height: 1.84 m (6 ft 0 in)
- Position: Forward

Team information
- Current team: VfL Wolfsburg
- Number: 17

Youth career
- –2010: Partille IF
- 2010–2015: Jonsereds IF

Senior career*
Years	Team	Apps	(Gls)
2016–2017	Jonsereds IF	34	(9)
2018	Sävedalens IF	19	(4)
2019	Örgryte IS	26	(5)
2020–2023	IF Elfsborg	65	(17)
2024–2026	Holstein Kiel	54	(13)
2026–	VfL Wolfsburg	4	(3)

International career^{‡}
2023–	Sweden	19	(0)
- * Club domestic league appearances and goals as of 20:26, 18 September 2026 (UTC) ‡ National team caps and goals as of 23:45, 17 November 2026 (UTC)

Alexander Olof Bernhardsson (born 8 September 1998) is a Swedish professional footballer who plays as a forward for 2. Bundesliga club VfL Wolfsburg and the Sweden national team.

== Club career ==
On 22 January 2024, Bernhardsson signed a contract with 2. Bundesliga club Holstein Kiel until 30 June 2027. On 18 August 2026, he signed a three-year contract with fellow German side VfL Wolfsburg.

== International career ==
Bernhardsson made his full international debut for Sweden on 9 January 2023, playing for 90 minutes in a friendly 2–0 win against Finland.

On 12 May 2026, Bernhardsson was named in the Sweden squad for the 2026 FIFA World Cup.

== Career statistics ==
=== Club ===
As of match played 18 September 2025

Appearances and goals by club, season and competition
Club	Season	League			National cup		Europe		Other		Total	
Club	Season	Division	Apps	Goals	Apps	Goals	Apps	Goals	Apps	Goals	Apps	Goals
Jonsereds IF	2017	Swedish football division 2	18	6	1	0	—		—		19	6
Sävedalens IF	2018	Swedish football division 2	19	4	2	0	—		—		21	4
Örgryte IS	2019	Superettan	26	5	2	0	—		—		28	5
IF Elfsborg	2020	Allsvenskan	0	0	1	0	—		—		1	0
IF Elfsborg	2021	Allsvenskan	21	4	0	0	5 (Note: Appearances in UEFA Conference League)	1	—		26	5
IF Elfsborg	2022	Allsvenskan	26	7	5	0	2	0	—		33	7
IF Elfsborg	2023	Allsvenskan	18	6	1	0	—		—		19	6
IF Elfsborg	Total		65	17	7	0	7	1	—		79	18
Holstein Kiel II	2023–24	Regionalliga Nord	13	4	—		—		—		13	4
Holstein Kiel	2023–24	Bundesliga	13	4	—		—		—		13	4
Holstein Kiel	2024–25	Bundesliga	19	7	1	0	—		—		20	7
Holstein Kiel	2025–26	2. Bundesliga	20	2	2	2	—		—		22	4
Holstein Kiel	2026–27	2. Bundesliga	2	0	—		—		—		2	0
Holstein Kiel	Total		54	13	3	2	—		—		57	15
VfL Wolfsburg	2026–27	2. Bundesliga	4	3	1	0	—		—		5	3
Career total			199	52	16	2	7	1	0	0	222	53

=== International ===
As of match played 17 November 2026

Appearances and goals by national team and year
National team	Year	Apps	Goals
Sweden	2023	1	0
Sweden	2024	0	0
Sweden	2025	8	0
Sweden	2026	10	0
Total		19	0
