= Max Geschwill =

German footballer (born 2001)

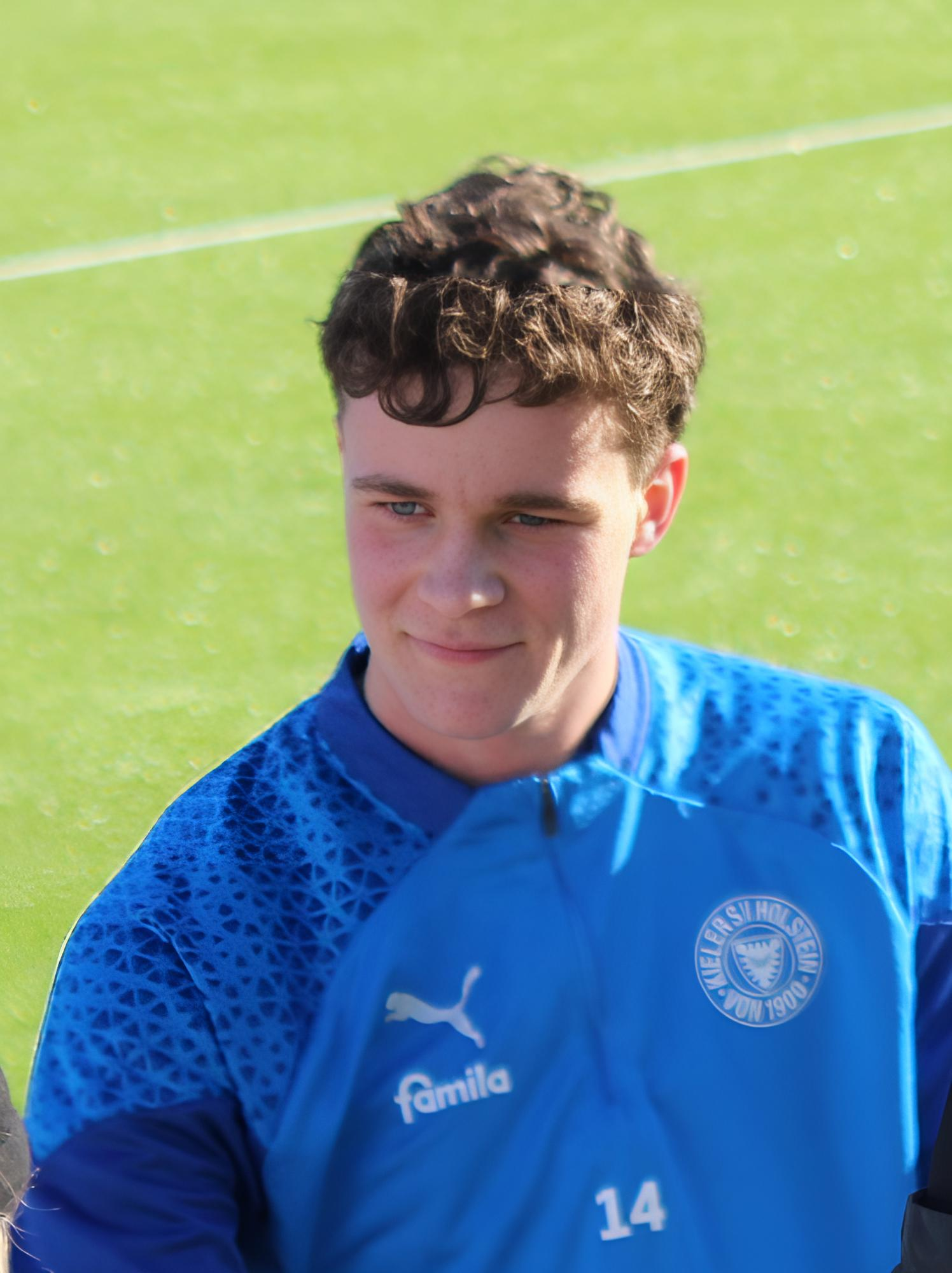

Personal information
- Date of birth: 7 July 2001 (age 25)
- Place of birth: Schwäbisch Hall, Germany
- Height: 1.82 m (6 ft 0 in)
- Position: Defender

Team information
- Current team: Rot-Weiss Essen
- Number: 6

Youth career
- VfL Mainhardt
- –2013: SG Mainhardt/Michelfeld/Bibersfeld
- 2013–2020: TSG 1899 Hoffenheim

Senior career*
Years	Team	Apps	(Gls)
2020–2023	TSG 1899 Hoffenheim	0	(0)
2020–2023	→ TSG 1899 Hoffenheim II (loan)	60	(3)
2023–2024	SV Sandhausen	27	(2)
2024–2026	Holstein Kiel	19	(1)
2024–2026	Holstein Kiel II	3	(0)
2025–2026	→ 1. FC Magdeburg (loan)	12	(0)
2026–	Rot-Weiss Essen	0	(0)
- * Club domestic league appearances and goals as of 18 May 2026

Max Geschwill (born 7 July 2001) is a German professional footballer who plays as a defender for 3. Liga club Rot-Weiss Essen.

== Early life ==
Geschwill was born on 7 July 2001 in Schwäbisch Hall, Germany to Peter Geschwill and Tanja Geschwill. Growing up in Mainhardt, Germany, he is the older brother of German footballer Maren Geschwill.

== Career ==
As a youth player, Geschwill joined the youth academy of VfL Mainhardt. Following his stint there, he joined the youth academy of SG Mainhardt/Michelfeld/Bibersfeld. In 2013, he joined the youth academy of Bundesliga side TSG 1899 Hoffenheim, helping the under-19 team reach the semi-finals of the 2018–19 UEFA Youth League. In addition, he started his senior career with the club and played for their reserve team, which he was captain of.

In 2023, he signed for SV Sandhausen, where he made twenty-seven league appearances and scored two goals. One year later, he signed for Bundesliga side Holstein Kiel. On 31 August 2024, he debuted for the club during a 2–0 home loss to VfL Wolfsburg in the league.

On 14 August 2025, Geschwill joined 1. FC Magdeburg on loan.

On 8 July 2026, Geschwill moved to Rot-Weiss Essen in 3. Liga.

== Career statistics ==
As of match played 17 May 2025

Appearances and goals by club, season and competition
Club	Season	League			Cup		Europe		Other		Total	
Club	Season	Division	Apps	Goals	Apps	Goals	Apps	Goals	Apps	Goals	Apps	Goals
1899 Hoffenheim	2020–21	Bundesliga	0	0	0	0	—		—		0	0
1899 Hoffenheim II (loan)	2020–21	Regionalliga Südwest	14	2	—		—		0	0	14	2
1899 Hoffenheim II (loan)	2021–22	Regionalliga Südwest	26	1	—		—		0	0	26	1
1899 Hoffenheim II (loan)	2022–23	Regionalliga Südwest	20	0	—		—		0	0	20	0
1899 Hoffenheim II (loan)	Total		60	3	—		—		0	0	60	3
SV Sandhausen	2023–24	3. Liga	27	2	2	0	—		2 (Note: Appearances in Baden Cup)	0	31	2
Holstein Kiel	2024–25	Bundesliga	19	1	1	0	—		—		20	1
Holstein Kiel II	2024–25	Regionalliga Nord	3	0	—		—		—		3	0
Career total			109	6	3	0	0	0	2	0	114	6
