= SpVgg Greuther Fürth =

German association football club

- Full name: Spielvereinigung Greuther Fürth e. V.
- Nickname: Kleeblätter (Shamrocks)
- Founded: 23 September 1903; 123 years ago as SpVgg Fürth
- Ground: Sportpark Ronhof | Thomas Sommer
- Capacity: 16,626
- President: Volker Heißmann
- Head coach: Heiko Vogel
- League: 2. Bundesliga
- 2025–26: 2. Bundesliga, 16th of 18
- Website: sgf1903.de
Home colours	Away colours	Third colours

Spielvereinigung Greuther Fürth (German pronunciation: [ˈʃpiːlfɛɐ̯ˌʔaɪnɪɡʊŋ ˌɡʁɔɪ̯tɐ ˈfʏʁt]), commonly known as Greuther Fürth (German pronunciation: [ˌɡʁɔɪ̯tɐ ˈfʏʁt]) or by their historical name, SpVgg Fürth, is a German football club based in Fürth, Bavaria. They play in the 2. Bundesliga, the second tier of the German football league system, following relegation from the Bundesliga in the 2021–22 season.

Founded in 1903, the most successful era for Greuther Fürth came in the pre-Bundesliga era in the 1910s and 1920s, when the club won three German championships, in 1914, 1926, and 1929 respectively, and finished as runners-up in 1920. In the 2012–13 season, the club played in the Bundesliga for the first time, having won promotion from the 2. Bundesliga; they were relegated back to the 2. Bundesliga at the end of the season. On 23 May 2021, they were promoted back to the Bundesliga for the second time. Upon placing 18th in the Bundesliga table in the 2021–22 season, they were relegated back to 2. Bundesliga.

== History ==
=== Spielvereinigung Fürth ===
The origins of SpVgg Fürth are in the establishment on 23 September 1903 of a football department within the gymnastics club Turnverein 1860 Fürth. The footballers went their own way as an independent club in November 1906, after they did not get enough support from TV Fürth. The team played in the Ostkreisliga and took divisional titles there in 1912, 1913 and 1914 before moving on to participate in the Süddeutsche (South German) regional playoffs for the national championship round. Right from the beginning, there was a great rivalry between the SpVgg Fürth and the 1. FC Nürnberg, predicated on the historical rivalry between the two neighbouring cities. The club grew rapidly, and by 1914, it had 3,000 members and was the largest sports club in Germany. When the club built their own stadium, Sportpark Ronhof, in 1910, it was the biggest stadium in Germany at the time.

==== National champions ====
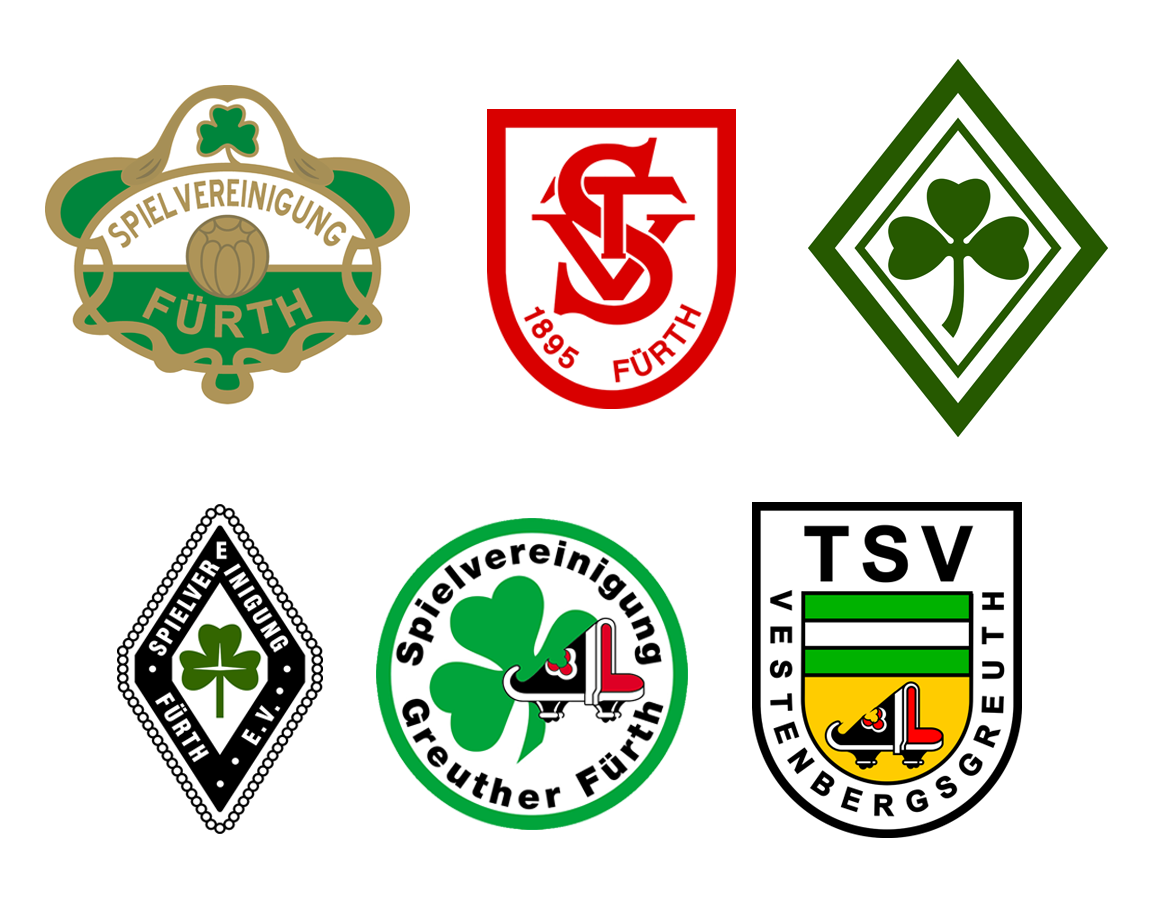
Historical logos of Greuther Fürth

Fürth won their first national title, the 1914 German football championship, under English coach William Townley with left winger Julius Hirsch, who had joined the team the prior season. They faced VfB Leipzig – the defending champions with three titles to their credit – in the final held on 31 May in Magdeburg. A 154-minute-long thriller, the longest completed game in German football history (the 1922 Final was abandoned after 189 minutes due to darkness), ended with Fürth scoring a golden goal to secure the title.

The team had a solid run of successes through the 1920s and into the early 1930s, beginning with an appearance in the national final in 1920 against 1. FC Nürnberg, which was the dominant side of the decade. The rivalry between the two clubs was such that a star player with SpVgg was forced to leave after he married a woman from the city of Nuremberg. In 1924, for the first and only time, the Germany national side was made up exclusively of players from just two sides – Fürth and 1. FC Nürnberg – and players of the two teams slept in separate rail coaches.

SpVgg showed regularly on the national stage, advancing to the semi-finals in 1923 and 1931. They claimed two more championships – in 1926 and 1929 – with both of those victories coming at the expense of Hertha BSC. Through this period, the club played five finals in the Süddeutscher Pokal (en:South German Cup), coming away as cup winners on four occasions. On 27 August 1929, the association was joined by FC Schneidig Fürth.

German football was re-organized in 1933 under the Third Reich into 16 top flight Gauligen. Fürth became part of the Gauliga Bayern, but their success over the next dozen seasons was limited to a division title there in 1935, alongside regular appearances in competition for the Tschammerpokal, predecessor to today's DFB-Pokal (German Cup).

==== Postwar play ====
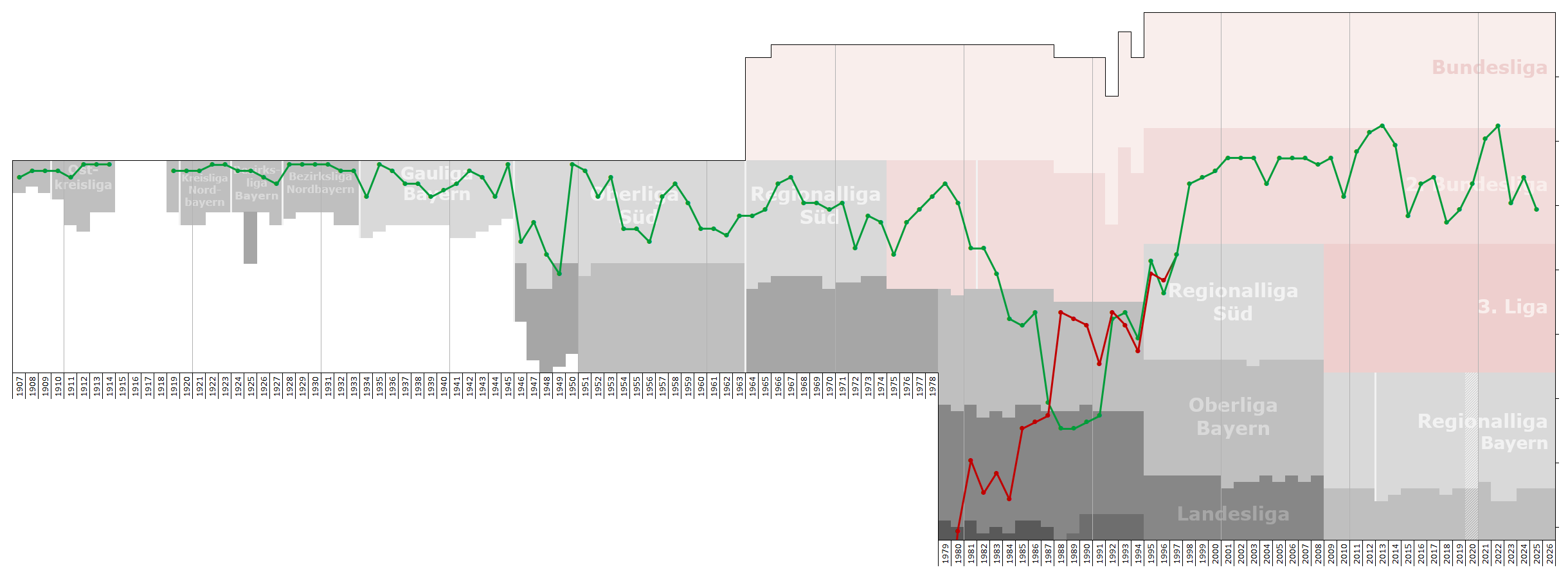
Historical chart of Greuther Fürth and predecessors' performance

After the war, the team struggled through three seasons in the Oberliga Süd (I) before slipping to the Landesliga Bayern (II). SpVgg quickly recovered itself and returned to Oberliga play the next season. They won the title there in 1950 and went on to the national playoffs, advancing as far as the semi-finals before being eliminated 1–4 by VfB Stuttgart. In 1954, two players from the SpVgg, Karl Mai and Herbert Erhardt, were members of the "Miracle of Bern" team that won Germany's first World Cup.

Fürth remained a first division side until the formation of the Bundesliga in 1963. The club did not qualify as one of the sixteen teams that made up the new unified national first division and they found themselves playing second division football in the Regionalliga Süd, where they were generally a mid-table side whose best finish was third-place result in 1967. The club played in the 2. Bundesliga from its inception in 1974 until 1983 with their best performance a fourth-place result in 1978–79. They slipped to playing in the tier III Bayernliga, with a short three-year spell in the fourth division Landesliga Bayern-Mitte in the late 1980s. At this time, the club started to have large financial problems. In 1990, Fürth celebrated a 3–1 victory in the opening round of the DFB-Pokal play over first division side Borussia Dortmund before going out 0–1 to 1. FC Saarbrücken in the second round. They returned to the Bayernliga (III) in 1991 and the Regionalliga Süd (III) in 1994. But still, the club's financial issues became bigger, and they were forced to sell their ground to the local businessman Conny Brandstätter. As the financial problems continued to grow, the president of SpVgg, Edgar Burkhart, arranged a deal with Helmut Hack, president of TSV Vestenbergsgreuth, to let TSV join the SpVgg and changing the name of the Spielvereinigung to the name SpVgg Greuther Fürth, which is still in use. The SpVgg so had the chance to get back in both financial and on-pitch success, while TSV could grow bigger in the city of Fürth than it would have been possible in the village of Vestenbergsgreuth.

=== TSV Vestenbergsgreuth ===
Meanwhile, the small village team of TSV Vestenbergsgreuth was established 1 February 1974 and debuted as a fourth division side. They advanced into the Amateur Oberliga Bayern (III) in 1987, just as SpVgg Fürth was descending to play in the division the more junior club had just escaped. TSV took part in the national amateur playoff round in 1988 and 1995. Their best performance came in the 1995 DFB-Pokal when they upset Bayern Munich 1–0, and then beat FC 08 Homburg 5–1, before being eliminated in the third round of the competition by VfL Wolfsburg on penalty kicks.

=== SpVgg Greuther Fürth ===
At the time when Vestenbergsgreuth's football branch was incorporated in 1996, in which TSV's football players came over to Fürth, both clubs were playing at about the same level in Regionalliga Süd (III). The SpVgg was runner-up behind long-term rival 1. FC Nürnberg in the division the next year, and so earned promotion back to the 2. Bundesliga after 18 years, and played in the second tier at the first time since 1979. At this time, the Sportpark Ronhof, now called Playmobil Arena, faced the first major redevelopment since the post-war years and the construction of the old main stand in 1950. They built new stands on three of the four sides of the pitch, a roofed seating stand on the opposite side of the main stand, an uncovered terrace in the north end, and an uncovered mixed standing and seating area in the south of the stadium, as well as installing floodlights in the Ronhof the first time ever. With the modernized stadium and a clever transfer strategy, they have consistently finished in the top half of the 18-team table in the 2000s, despite having one of the lowest budgets most of the time. On 1 July 2003, the club added former workers' club Tuspo Fürth to its tradition through a merger. In 2008, the stadium faced another redevelopment, as the standing terrace in the north got a roof, and a VIP building was installed near to the old main stand. With this work, the main stand became the last piece of the stadium that has not been redeveloped. In that time, Fürth has come close to renewing its ancient rivalry with Nürnberg at the Bundesliga level, narrowly missing promotion in each of the first two seasons of the 2010s. On 23 April 2012, Fürth finally gained promotion to the Bundesliga in the 2011–12 season, eventually winning the 2. Bundesliga under manager Mike Büskens. With promotion, the 1998-built south stand was demolished, and a new one was installed, gaining a capacity increase from 14,500 to 18,000, as well as providing a roof on the south for the first time.

However, Fürth had a difficult first season in the Bundesliga as the club amassed only four victories in the 34-game campaign, one of them at the ground of their rivals 1. FC Nürnberg, when the de facto relegated side won 1–0, giving the fans of the Kleeblatt a peaceful feeling about the relegation. The club also set an infamous record by becoming the first club in Bundesliga history to not win a single home game during the regular season. The club finished last in the league with 21 points and was relegated back to the 2. Bundesliga.

The following season, despite not aiming for promotion, the club was a strong contender for a direct return to the Bundesliga. A third place in the final standings qualified the team for the promotion play-offs, where it faced Hamburger SV. After a 0–0 draw in Hamburg, the club missed out on promotion on the away goal rule when the return leg ended 1–1. In the following seasons, they struggled to be as strong as they were before the Bundesliga promotion. They nearly got relegated to the 3. Liga in the 2014–15 season, when only a narrow win against later promoted club SV Darmstadt 98 on matchday 33, and other teams not winning on matchday 34, kept them in the league. In the same season, on early matchday 2, they gained a historic 5–1 home victory in the Frankenderby, their highest-ever home win in a derby. In the following two years, the Spielvereinigung finished mid-table, with not having either fear of getting relegated or gaining promotion. This period of their newer history is characterized by the relegation of FCN in 2014, and both rivals playing each year since then. In the 2016–17 season, the Kleeblatt won both derbies of the regular season for the first time since the 1970s, and finished above Nuremberg for the first time since the 1950s. In early 2016, the 1950-built main stand was demolished, and the construction of a new main stand started. Before the 2017–18 season, the construction of the new main stand was finished. With a 3–1 victory over Fortuna Düsseldorf on 17 September 2017, the club became leader of the all-time league table of the 2. Bundesliga.

By finishing second in the 2020–21 season, Greuther Fürth gained promotion to the Bundesliga for the second time in the club's history. Under manager Stefan Leitl, the team secured promotion on the last matchday of the season with a 3–2 victory over Fortuna Düsseldorf.

=== SpVgg Greuther Fürth II ===
Fürth also fields a reserve side which has played in the Oberliga Bayern (IV) since the 2001–02 season and finished second there in 2006–07. which lead to promotion to Regionalliga Süd.

== Rivals ==
1. FC Nürnberg is by far Fürth’s biggest rival, going back to the early days of German football when, at times, those two clubs dominated the national championship. In German, matches between the two sides are known as the "Frankenderby”.

Nürnberg are the most recent winners in this rivalry, having beat Fürth 4-2 away in the 2. Bundesliga in August 2026.

Their minor rivals also include Bayern Munich.

== Players ==
=== Current squad ===
As of 3 September 2026

Note: Flags indicate national team as defined under FIFA eligibility rules; some limited exceptions apply. Players may hold more than one non-FIFA nationality.

No.	Pos.	Nation	Player
1	GK	GER	Florian Hellstern (on loan from VfB Stuttgart)
2	DF	GER	Lukas Reich
4	DF	ALG	Elias Benkara (on loan from Borussia Dortmund)
5	DF	GER	Maxim Dal
6	MF	BFA	Sacha Bansé
7	FW	GER	Dennis Srbeny
8	MF	GER	Shinta Appelkamp
9	FW	USA	Jordan Pefok
10	MF	GER	Ole Pohlmann
11	MF	SUI	Aaron Keller
13	MF	GER	Paul Will
18	MF	EGY	Omar Megeed
19	FW	GER	Benjamin Zank
20	DF	SUI	Loris Giandomenico (on loan from Grasshoppers)

No.	Pos.	Nation	Player
21	MF	GER	Mika Wallentowitz (on loan from Schalke 04)
22	DF	GER	Jannis Heuer
23	DF	GER	Jannik Dehm
27	DF	GER	Luca Itter
28	MF	FIN	Doni Arifi
29	DF	HUN	Krisztián Keresztes (on loan from Nyíregyháza Spartacus)
30	MF	GER	Felix Klaus (captain)
34	DF	GER	Hendry Blank (on loan from Red Bull Salzburg)
36	MF	GER	Philipp Müller
37	MF	KOS	Faton Ademi
39	GK	GER	Christian Ortag
42	FW	GER	Omar Sillah
43	GK	GER	Silas Prüfrock
44	MF	GER	Mehmet Avlayici

=== Out on loan ===
Note: Flags indicate national team as defined under FIFA eligibility rules; some limited exceptions apply. Players may hold more than one non-FIFA nationality.

No.	Pos.	Nation	Player
—	GK	GER	Sebastian Jung (at FSV Zwickau until 30 June 2027)
—	DF	GER	David Abrangao (at Würzburger Kickers until 30 June 2027)

No.	Pos.	Nation	Player
—	DF	GER	Noah König (at SC Verl until 30 June 2027)

== Current technical staff ==
As of 15 April 2026

Position	Name
Head coach	(Germany) Heiko Vogel
Assistant coach	(Germany) Danny Schwarz (Germany) Aleksandro Petrović
Goalkeeper coach	(Germany) Nico Hildebrandt
Coordinator of medicine & sports science	(Germany) Michael Schleinkofer
Fitness coach	(Germany) Florian Leimeister
Video analyst	(Germany) Simon Hofmann
Individual coach	(Germany) Christopher Hickson
Team doctor	(Germany) Dr. Stefan Söllner (Germany) Dr. Ekkehardt Templer
Physiotherapist	(Germany) Benjamin Ngarambe (Germany) Patrick Rutte (Germany) Christoph Porzelt
Head of organization licensed team	(Germany) Nadine Mikolajetz
Team coordinator	(Germany) Daniel Wiegand
Team manager	(Germany) Mareike Ahlborn

== Honours ==
=== League ===
- German championship
  - Champions: 1914, 1926, 1929
- 2. Bundesliga
  - Champions: 2011–12
- Landesliga Bayern-Mitte (IV)
  - Champions: 1990–91

=== Cup ===
- German Indoor Cup
  - Winner: 2000

=== Regional ===
- Southern German championship
  - Champions: 1914, 1923, 1931
- Ostkreis-Liga (I)
  - Champions: 1912, 1913, 1914, 1917
- Kreisliga Nordbayern (I)
  - Champions: 1922, 1923
- Bezirksliga Nordbayern (I)
  - Champions: 1927–28, 1929–30, 1930–31
- Gauliga Bayern (I)
  - Champions: 1934–35
- Oberliga Süd (I)
  - Champions: 1949–50
- Southern German Cup
  - Winner: 1918, 1923, 1925, 1926, 1927 (record)
- Mittelfranken Cup (Tiers III–VII)
  - Winner: 1990, 1991, 1996, 1997
  - Runners-up: 1989

=== Invitational ===
- Tournoi de Pentecôte de Paris
  - Winner: 1925

=== Youth team ===
- Bavarian Under 19 championship
  - Champions: 2003
- Bavarian Under 17 championship
  - Champions: 2001, 2008
- Bavarian Under 15 championship
  - Champions: 2004

== Notable former players ==
- Karl Mai, earned 21 caps for Germany and played in the 1954 World Cup
- Herbert Erhardt earned 50 caps for Germany and played in the World Cups 1954, 1958 and 1962
- Julius Hirsch, earned 7 caps for Germany and played in the 1912 Summer Olympics; killed during the Holocaust
- Heiko Westermann, German international player
- Roberto Hilbert, German international player
- Rachid Azzouzi, played for Morocco in the World Cups 1994 and 1998
- Gerald Asamoah, German international player
- Nicolai Müller, German international player
- Abdul Rahman Baba, Ghana international player
- Stephan Schröck, captain of the Philippines national team
- Anton Stach, German international player
- David Raum, German international player
- Jamie Leweling, German international Player

=== Famous coaches ===
William Townley, had three turns as coach of SpVgg Fürth in 1911–1913, 1926–1927, and 1930–1932 and led the club to two championships.

== Recent coaches ==
List of club's coach since 1974:

Name	From	Until
(Germany) Alfred Hoffmann	1 July 1974	30 June 1975
(Germany) Hans Cieslarczyk	1 July 1975	30 June 1977
(Germany) Hannes Baldauf	1 July 1977	30 June 1980
(Germany) Dieter Schulte	1 July 1980	28 February 1981
(Germany) Heinz Lucas	1 March 1981	30 June 1981
(Germany) Hans-Dieter Roos	1 July 1981	15 November 1981
(Germany) Lothar Kleim	23 November 1981	30 June 1982
(Germany) Franz Brungs	1 July 1982	30 June 1983
(Germany) Günter Gerling	1 July 1983	30 June 1986
(Germany) Lothar Kleim	1 July 1986	28 February 1987
(Germany) Paul Hesselbach	1 March 1987	30 June 1989
(Germany) Günter Gerling	1 July 1989	9 April 1995
(Germany) Bertram Beierlorzer	10 April 1995	30 June 1996
(Germany) Armin Veh	1 July 1996	30 June 1997
(Germany) Benno Möhlmann	15 October 1997	21 October 2000
(Germany) Paul Hesselbach	22 October 2000	19 November 2000
(Germany) Uwe Erkenbrecher	20 November 2000	30 August 2001

Name	From	Until
(Germany) Paul Hesselbach (interim)	1 September 2001	29 October 2001
(Germany) Eugen Hach	30 October 2001	5 November 2003
(Germany) Werner Dreßel (interim)	6 November 2003	29 December 2003
(Germany) Thomas Kost	30 December 2003	16 February 2004
(Germany) Benno Möhlmann	18 February 2004	30 June 2007
(Germany) Bruno Labbadia	1 July 2007	30 June 2008
(Germany) Benno Möhlmann	1 July 2008	20 December 2009
(Germany) Mike Büskens	27 December 2009	20 February 2013
(Germany) Ludwig Preis (interim)	21 February 2013	11 March 2013
(Germany) Frank Kramer	12 March 2013	23 February 2015
(Germany) Mike Büskens	23 February 2015	28 May 2015
(Germany) Stefan Ruthenbeck	12 June 2015	21 November 2016
(Hungary) Janos Radoki	21 November 2016	28 August 2017
(Germany) Mirko Dickhaut (interim)	28 August 2017	9 September 2017
(Croatia) Damir Burić	9 September 2017	4 February 2019
(Germany) Stefan Leitl	5 February 2019	30 June 2022
(Switzerland) Marc Schneider	1 July 2022	15 October 2022
(Germany) Alexander Zorniger	23 October 2022	22 October 2024
(Germany) Leonhard Haas	22 October 2024	12 November 2024
(Germany) Jan Siewert	12 November 2024	5 May 2025
(Germany) Thomas Kleine (interim) (Montenegro) Milorad Peković (interim)	5 May 2025	30 June 2025
(Germany) Thomas Kleine	1 July 2025	1 December 2025
(Germany) Heiko Vogel	1 December 2025	

== Recent seasons ==
The recent season-by-season performance of the club:

=== SpVgg Greuther Fürth ===
Season	Division	Tier	Position
1999–2000	2. Bundesliga	II	7th
2000–01	2. Bundesliga	II	5th
2001–02	2. Bundesliga	II	5th
2002–03	2. Bundesliga	II	5th
2003–04	2. Bundesliga	II	9th
2004–05	2. Bundesliga	II	5th
2005–06	2. Bundesliga	II	5th
2006–07	2. Bundesliga	II	5th
2007–08	2. Bundesliga	II	6th
2008–09	2. Bundesliga	II	5th
2009–10	2. Bundesliga	II	11th
2010–11	2. Bundesliga	II	4th
2011–12	2. Bundesliga	II	1st ↑
2012–13	Bundesliga	I	18th ↓
2013–14	2. Bundesliga	II	3rd
2014–15	2. Bundesliga	II	14th
2015–16	2. Bundesliga	II	9th
2016–17	2. Bundesliga	II	8th
2017–18	2. Bundesliga	II	15th
2018–19	2. Bundesliga	II	13th
2019–20	2. Bundesliga	II	9th
2020–21	2. Bundesliga	II	2nd ↑
2021–22	Bundesliga	I	18th ↓
2022–23	2. Bundesliga	II	12th
2023–24	2. Bundesliga	II	8th
2024–25	2. Bundesliga	II	13th
2025–26	2. Bundesliga	II	16th
2026–27	2. Bundesliga	II	

=== SpVgg Greuther Fürth II ===
Season	Division	Tier	Position
1999–2000	Bezirksoberliga Mittelfranken	VI	1st ↑
2000–01	Landesliga Bayern-Mitte	V	1st ↑
2001–02	Bayernliga	IV	5th
2002–03	Bayernliga	IV	9th
2003–04	Bayernliga	IV	4th
2004–05	Bayernliga	IV	12th
2005–06	Bayernliga	IV	4th
2006–07	Bayernliga	IV	2nd
2007–08	Bayernliga	IV	2nd ↑
2008–09	Regionalliga Süd	IV	11th
2009–10	Regionalliga Süd	IV	11th
2010–11	Regionalliga Süd	IV	4th
2011–12	Regionalliga Süd	IV	6th
2012–13	Regionalliga Bayern	IV	12th
2013–14	Regionalliga Bayern	IV	9th
2014–15	Regionalliga Bayern	IV	14th
2015–16	Regionalliga Bayern	IV	9th
2016–17	Regionalliga Bayern	IV	16th
2017–18	Regionalliga Bayern	IV	13th
2018–19	Regionalliga Bayern	IV	14th
2019–20	Regionalliga Bayern	IV	7th
2021–22	Regionalliga Bayern	IV	17th
2022–23	Regionalliga Bayern	IV	8th
2023–24	Regionalliga Bayern	IV	8th
2024–25	Regionalliga Bayern	IV	5th

- With the introduction of the Bezirksoberligas in 1988 as the new fifth tier, below the Landesligas, all leagues below dropped one tier. With the introduction of the Regionalligas in 1994 and the 3. Liga in 2008 as the new third tier, below the 2. Bundesliga, all leagues below dropped one tier. With the establishment of the Regionalliga Bayern as the new fourth tier in Bavaria in 2012 the Bayernliga was split into a northern and a southern division, the number of Landesligas expanded from three to five and the Bezirksoberligas abolished. All leagues from the Bezirksligas onwards were elevated one tier.

Key

↑ Promoted	↓ Relegated

=== Notable fans ===
In September 2012, former United States Secretary of State Henry Kissinger, whose family fled Nazi Germany in 1938, attended a SpVgg match against Schalke 04. He had promised to attend a game at the Ronhof stadium if the team were promoted to the top-flight Bundesliga. As a child, Kissinger had tried to watch games there, despite it being against his parents' wishes. Kissinger was an honorary member of SpVgg, and for decades he kept himself informed about match results and held contact to the club. During his time serving in the White House in the 1970s, he reportedly asked his staff to have the team's weekend result ready for him on Monday mornings. He visited his hometown and the club several times and attended a Bundesliga match in 2012 during the team's first season in the Bundesliga.
