= 2005 =

2005 in various calendars
- Gregorian calendar: 2005; MMV
- Ab urbe condita: 2758
- Armenian calendar: 1454; ԹՎ ՌՆԾԴ
- Assyrian calendar: 6755
- Baháʼí calendar: 161–162
- Balinese saka calendar: 1926–1927
- Bengali calendar: 1411–1412
- Berber calendar: 2955
- British Regnal year: 53 Eliz. 2 – 54 Eliz. 2
- Buddhist calendar: 2549
- Burmese calendar: 1367
- Byzantine calendar: 7513–7514
- Chinese calendar: 甲申年 (Wood Monkey); 4702 or 4495 — to — 乙酉年 (Wood Rooster); 4703 or 4496
- Coptic calendar: 1721–1722
- Discordian calendar: 3171
- Ethiopian calendar: 1997–1998
- Hebrew calendar: 5765–5766
- Hindu calendars
- Vikram Samvat: 2061–2062
- Shaka Samvat: 1926–1927
- Kali Yuga: 5105–5106
- Holocene calendar: 12005
- Igbo calendar: 1005–1006
- Iranian calendar: 1383–1384
- Islamic calendar: 1425–1426
- Japanese calendar: Heisei 17 (平成１７年)
- Javanese calendar: 1937–1938
- Juche calendar: 94
- Julian calendar: Gregorian minus 13 days
- Korean calendar: 4338
- Minguo calendar: ROC 94 民國94年
- Nanakshahi calendar: 537
- Thai solar calendar: 2548
- Tibetan calendar: ཤིང་ཕོ་སྤྲེ་ལོ་ (male Wood-Monkey); 2131 or 1750 or 978 — to — ཤིང་མོ་བྱ་ལོ་ (female Wood-Bird); 2132 or 1751 or 979
- Unix time: 1104537600 – 1136073599

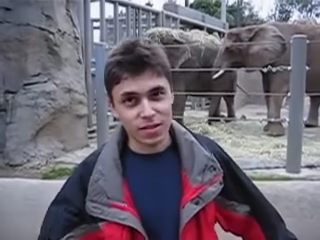
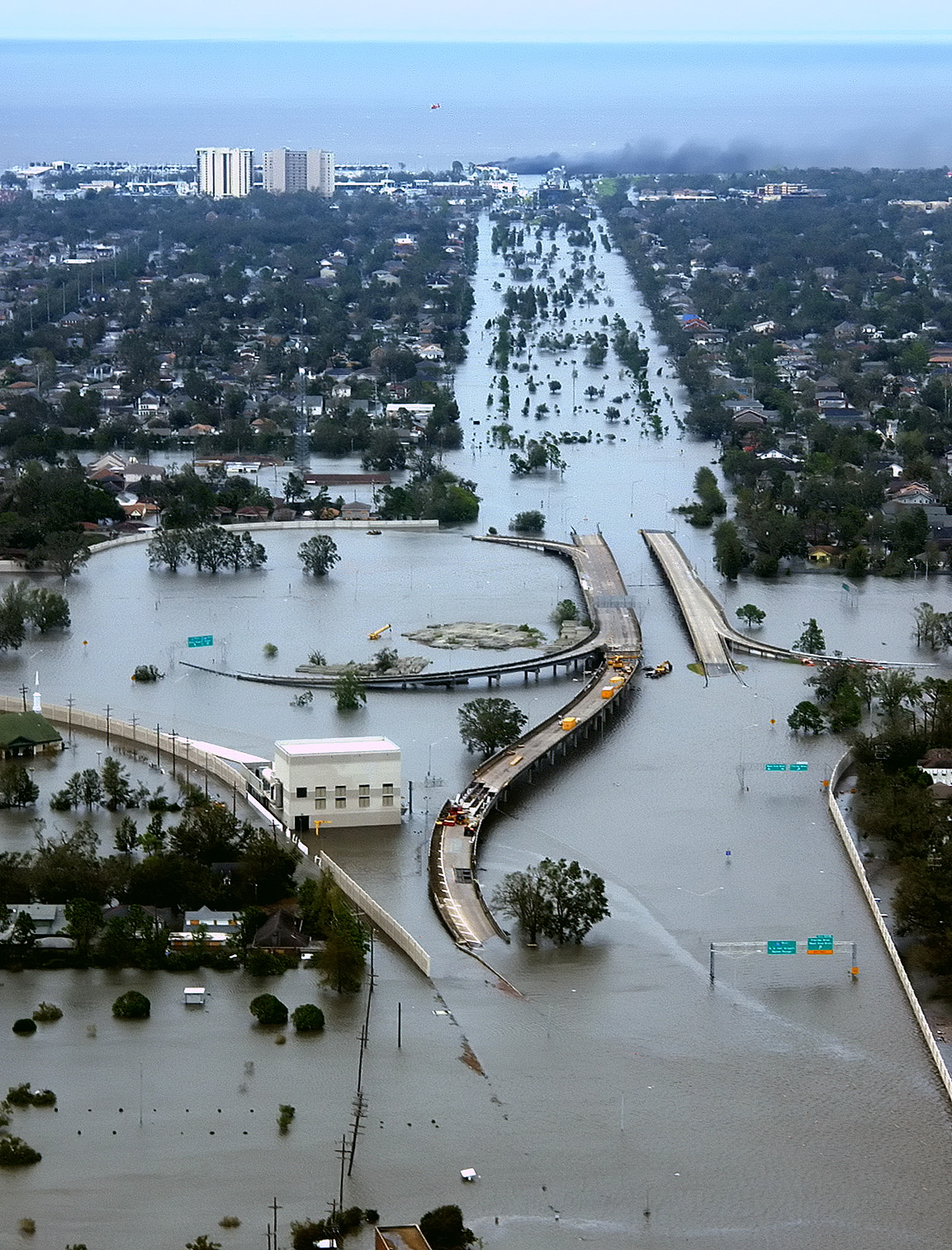
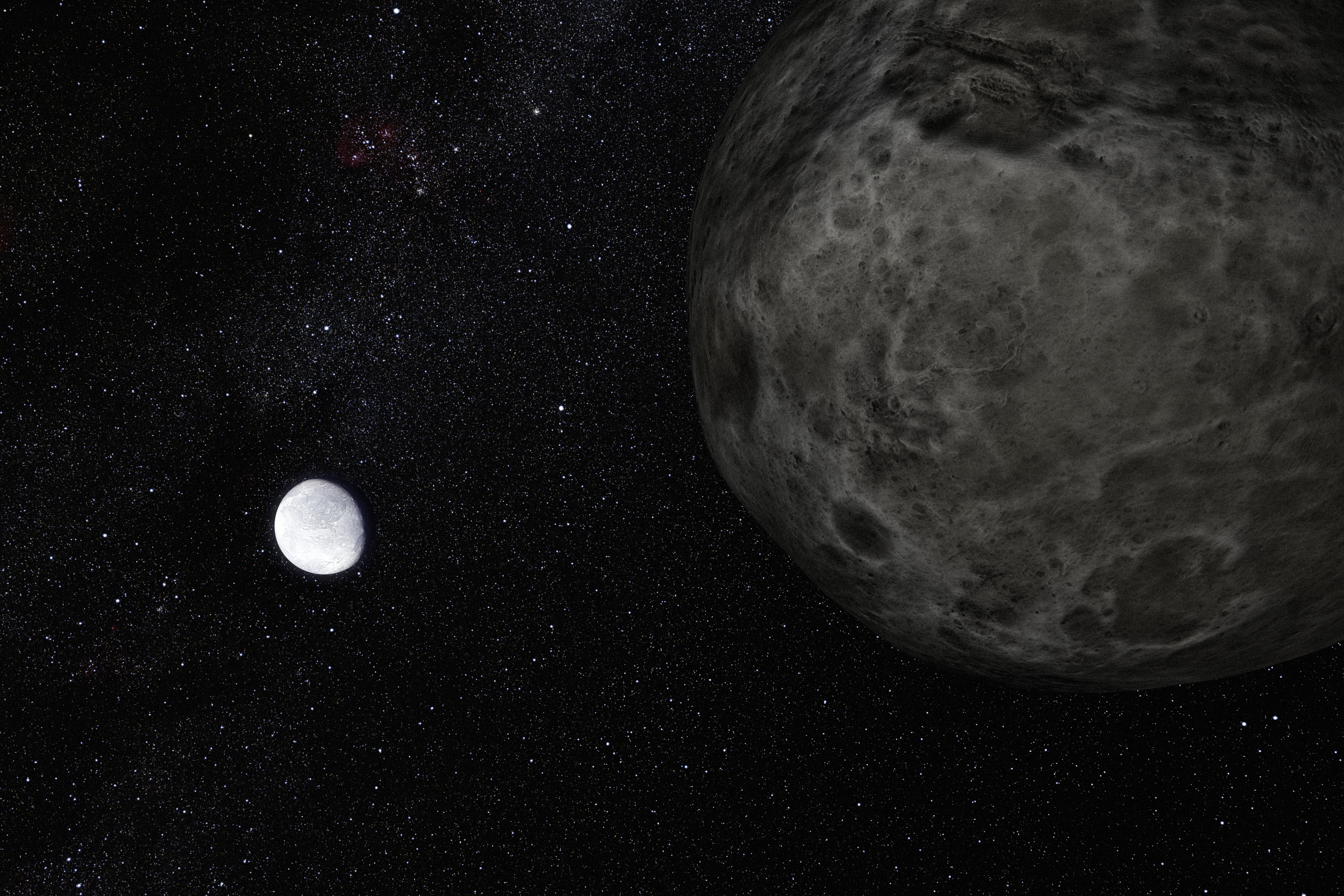
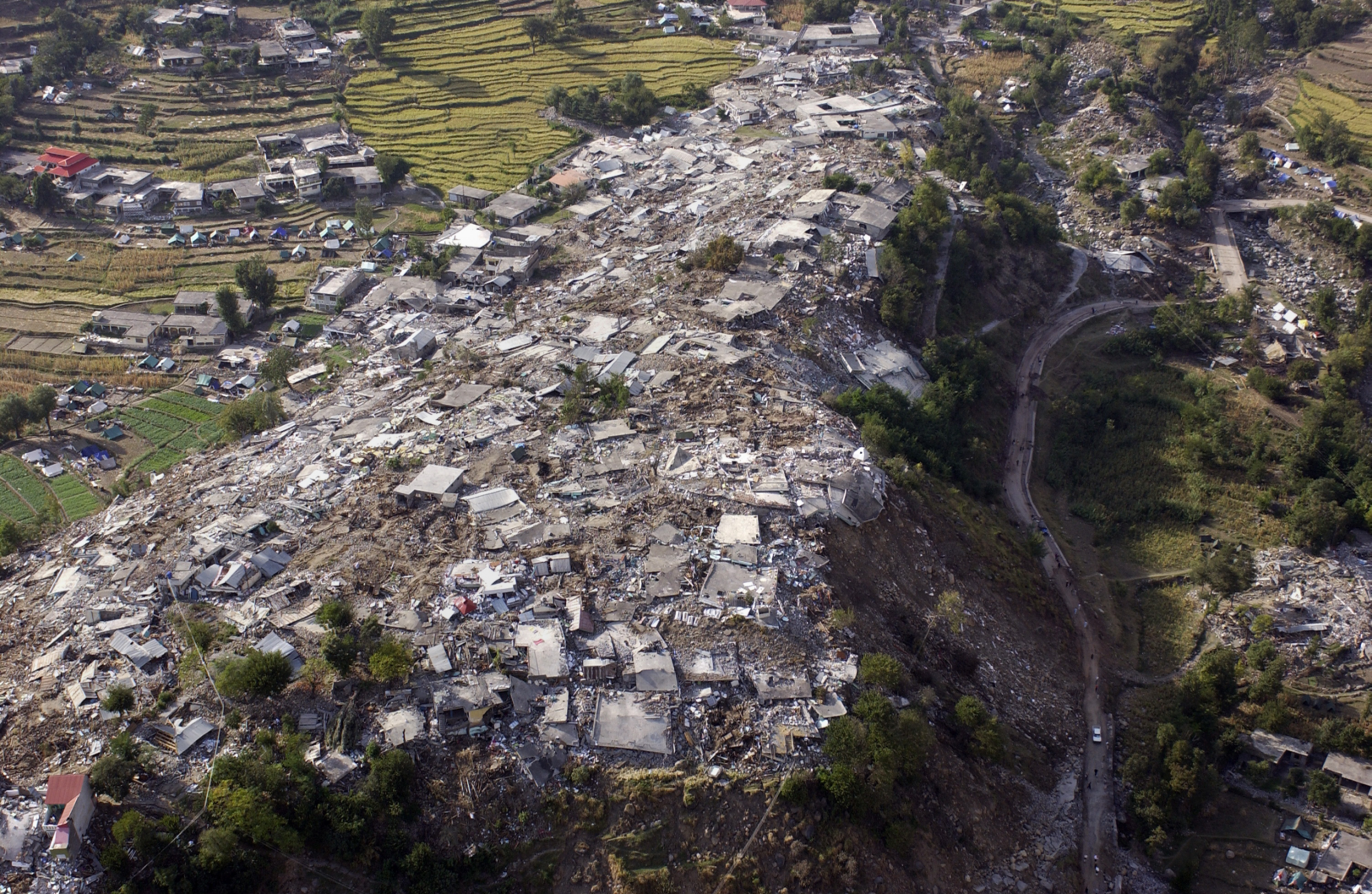
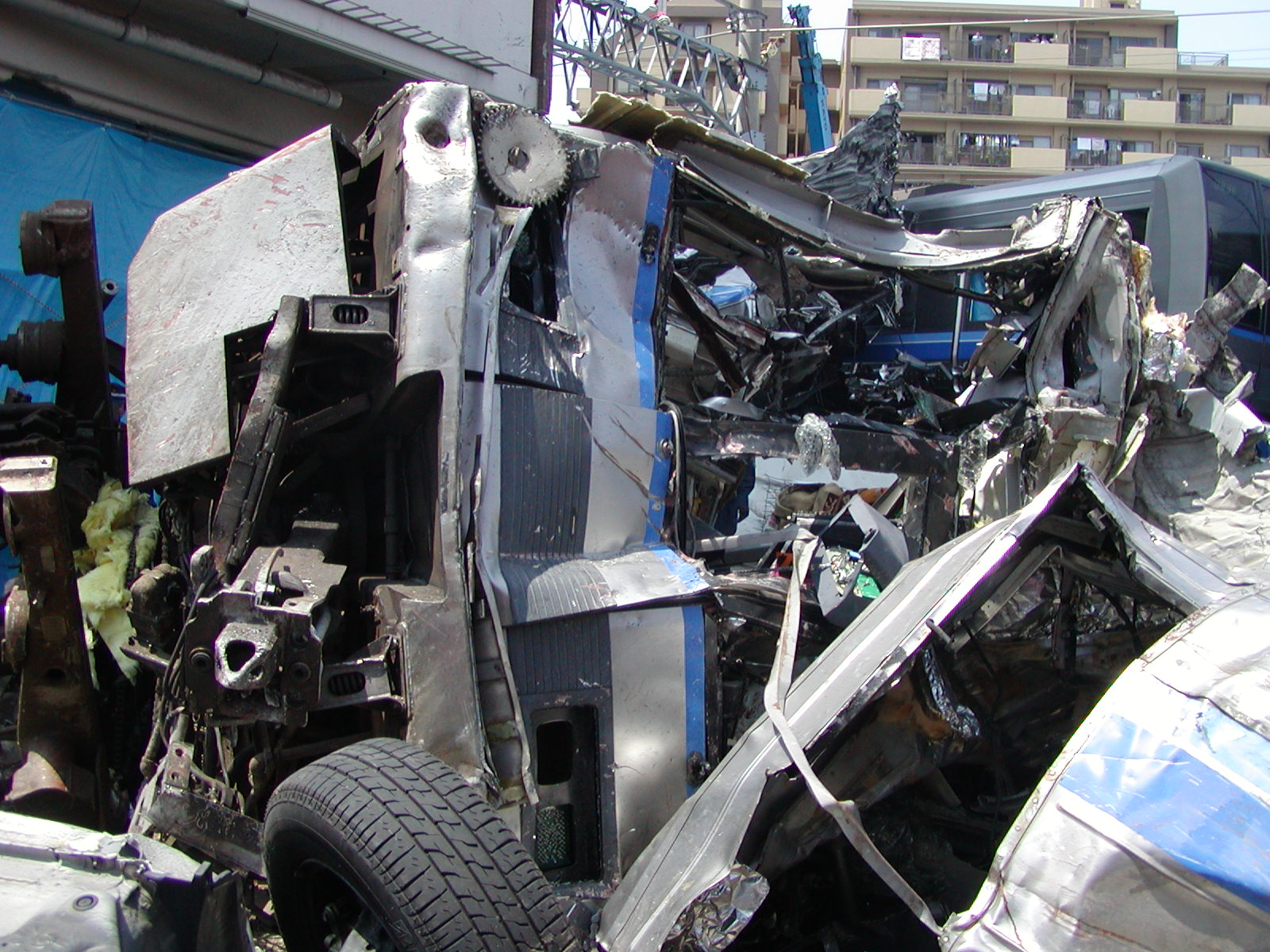
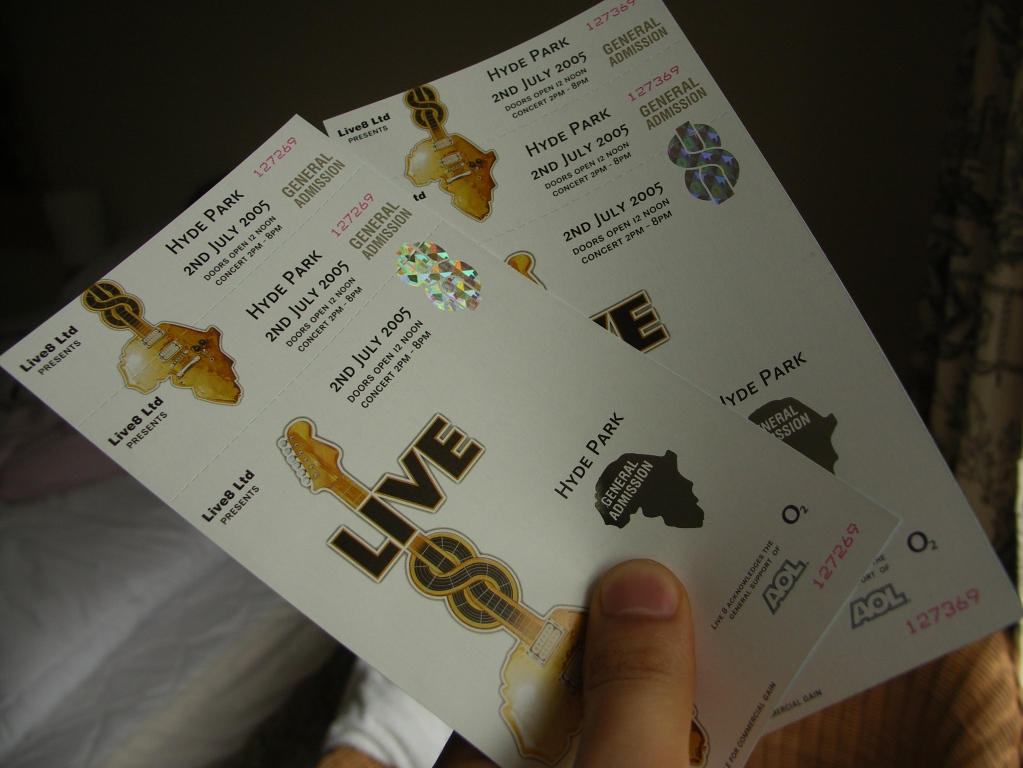
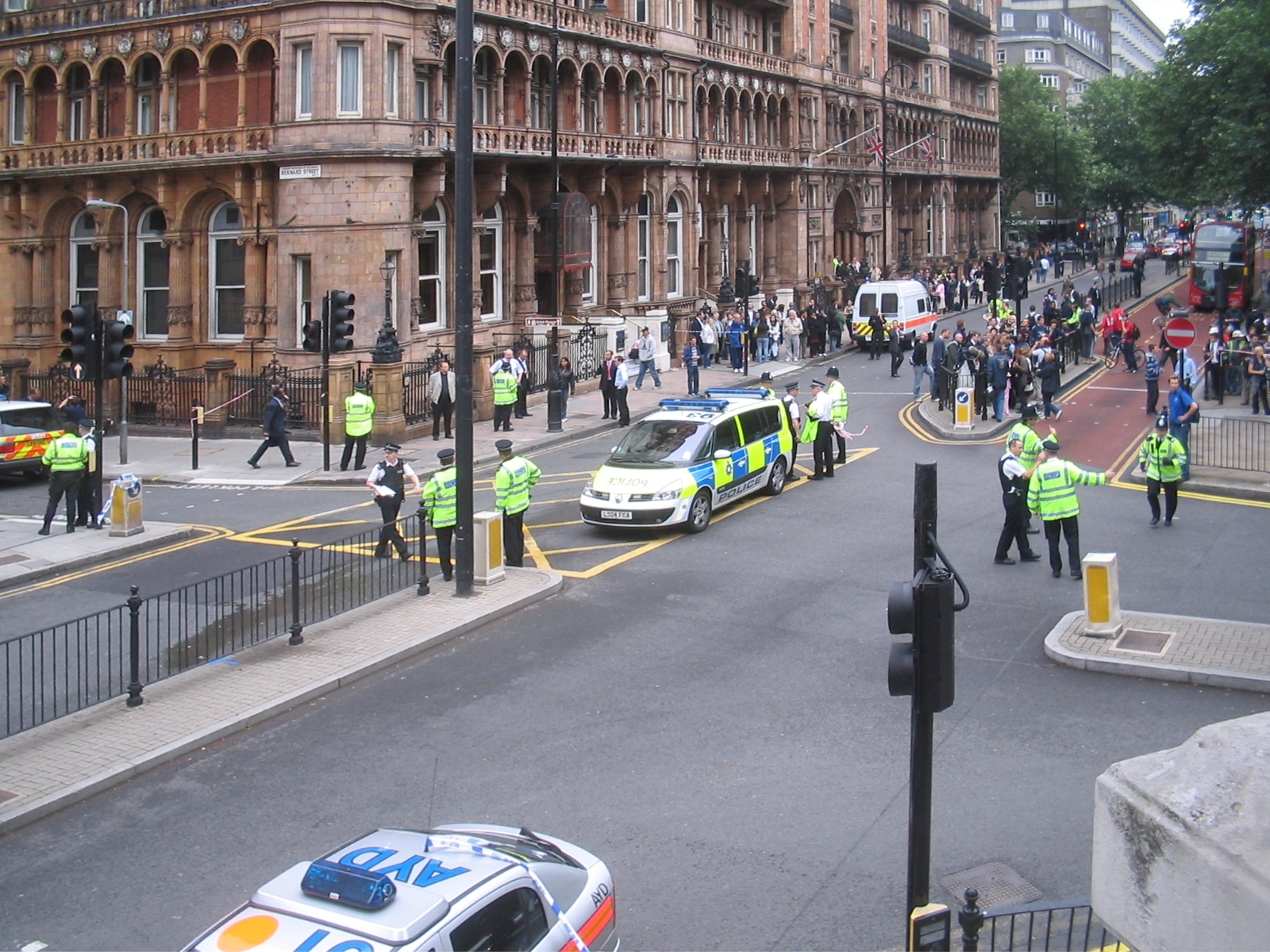
From left to right, top to bottom:
- YouTube was launched, with "Me at the zoo" being the first video on the platform;
- Hurricane Katrina devastated New Orleans, killed 1,392, and displaced millions; it is tied as the costliest hurricane of all time as of today;
- Eris, the largest known dwarf planet at the time, was discovered;
- Pope John Paul II dies;
- An earthquake in Kashmir kills between 75,000 and 90,000;
- A truck bombing assassinates Rafic Hariri, the former prime minister of Lebanon;
- The Amagasaki derailment occurred when a seven-car commuter train came off the tracks on West Japan Railway Company's (JR West) Fukuchiyama Line just before Amagasaki. 107 people were killed in the derailment;
- Tickets to a Live 8 concert at Hyde Park in London;
- 4 Islamic suicide bombings on the London Underground kill 56 and become one of the deadliest terrorist attacks in London.

2005 (MMV) was a common year starting on Saturday of the Gregorian calendar, the 2005th year of the Common Era (CE) and Anno Domini (AD) designations, the 5th year of the 3rd millennium and the 21st century, and the 6th year of the 2000s decade.

2005 was designated as the International Year for Sport and Physical Education and the International Year of Microcredit. The beginning of 2005 also marked the end of the International Decade of the World's Indigenous People (1995–2005).

== World population ==
The world population on January 1, 2005, was estimated to be 6.545 billion people and increased to 6.629 billion people by January 1, 2006. An estimated 137.2 million births and 53.4 million deaths took place in 2005. The average global life expectancy was 68.1 years, an increase of 0.4 years from 2004. The estimated number of global refugees decreased from 9.54 million to its lowest in 25 years, 8.39 million refugees, by the end of the year. Afghanistan was the largest source of refugees with approximately 1.9 million people.

== Conflicts ==
There were 32 conflicts in 2005 that caused at least 25 fatalities, all of which were intrastate wars involving violent non-state actors. Five of these resulted in over 1,000 fatalities: the Iraqi insurgency, the Taliban insurgency in Afghanistan, the Kashmir insurgency, the Nepalese Civil War, and the Colombian conflict. Among continuing conflicts from previous years, the Iraqi insurgency meant further violence in Iraq throughout 2005, including a major suicide bombing on February 28 and a series of attacks as the Iraqi Transitional Government was established in April and May. The Second Chechen War in Russia saw the assassination of Chechen rebel leader Aslan Maskhadov by Russian forces on March 8, and the Kivu conflict and Ituri conflict continued in the Democratic Republic of the Congo despite the formal end of the Second Congo War in 2002.

Peace talks took place to end the Second Intifada between Israel and Palestine, which were complicated by attacks from Palestinian militant groups and subsequent Israeli retaliation. Hezbollah also engaged in conflict with Israel, causing violence in Golan Heights and on the Israel–Lebanon border. Israel disengaged from its occupation of Gaza beginning on August 14.

Islamist militants carried out a series of bombings in London on July 7, killing 56 people. Another series of bombings occurred in Bali, Indonesia, on October 1, killing 23 people. Jordan faced its worst attack when bombs destroyed three hotels in Amman on November 9, killing 60 people.

The government of Myanmar broke its 2003 ceasefire with the Karen National Union in January, and it engaged in heightened conflict with the Shan State Army (RCSS) in April. The frozen conflict between Azerbaijan and the breakaway Nagorno-Karabakh also reignited as a 1994 ceasefire collapsed. In Sri Lanka, peace talks broke down with the Liberation Tigers of Tamil Eelam. New rebel groups that emerged in 2005 included the Rally for Democracy and Liberty in Chad, the National Socialist Council of Nagaland in India, the Kurdistan Free Life Party in Iran, and the Maoist Communist Party in Turkey.

The Comprehensive Peace Agreement between Sudan and the Sudan People's Liberation Movement was signed on January 9, ending the Second Sudanese Civil War. The other conflict in Sudan, the War in Darfur, remained active with heavy targeting of civilians and aid workers. The First Ivorian Civil War remained frozen as a fragile ceasefire held between Ivory Coast and the Forces Nouvelles de Côte d'Ivoire while peace negotiations stalled. The Kashmir conflict between India and Pakistan remained mostly peaceful, though militant groups carried out occasional attacks.

== Culture ==
The highest-grossing film globally in 2005 was Harry Potter and the Goblet of Fire, followed by Star Wars: Episode III – Revenge of the Sith and The Chronicles of Narnia: The Lion, the Witch and the Wardrobe. Critically acclaimed films from 2005 include Brokeback Mountain and A History of Violence.

Revenue from digital music sales became the third biggest music market in 2005 when it exceeded revenue from singles. The best-selling album globally in 2005 was X&Y by Coldplay, followed by The Emancipation of Mimi by Mariah Carey and The Massacre by 50 Cent. The best-selling non-English album was the Spanish-language album Fijación Oral, Vol. 1 by Shakira, the 27th best-selling of the year.

Critically acclaimed video games from 2005 include Civilization IV, God of War, and Resident Evil 4.

== Economy ==
The gross world product increased by 3.2% in 2005, slowing from the 4.0% growth of 2004. International trade grew by 7.1% in volume, decreasing from the 11.0% growth of 2004. The price of oil surged in 2005, but not to the extent of a similar surge in 2004. Depreciation of the United States dollar reversed in 2005 as it gained value relative to the euro and Japanese yen, though it continued depreciating relative to the currencies of many developing nations.

== Environment and weather ==
The year 2005 was estimated to be tied with 1998 as the hottest year on record. Areas around the Arctic Circle were especially hot relative to historical temperatures. Heatwaves occurred in Australia in March through May and the Southwestern United States in July, while the Balkans experienced extreme cold in February. The year had average rainfall globally. Heavy rain led to floods in Colombia, Saudi Arabia, and central and eastern Europe, while Brazil and southeastern Africa faced severe droughts. An 8.6 magnitude earthquake struck on March 28 and killed approximately 1,300 people in Sumatra, and a magnitude 7.6 earthquake struck on October 8 and killed approximately 80,000 people in Kashmir.

The 2005 Atlantic hurricane season was the most active in recorded history with 28 storms, exceeding the 1933 record of 21 storms, including 15 hurricanes, exceeding the 1969 record of 12 hurricanes. Four hurricanes reached category 5: Hurricane Emily, Hurricane Katrina, Hurricane Rita, and Hurricane Wilma. Katrina was the most costly hurricane, killing approximately 1,500 people and causing about $81 billion in damage. Hurricane Stan caused flooding that killed another 1,000 to 2,000 people. The 2005 Pacific typhoon season was average in intensity, and there were a total of 24 tropical storms. Two typhoons reached category 5: Typhoon Haitang and Typhoon Nabi. China was the most severely affected by the season, facing approximately $3 billion in damage.

== Health ==
The H5N1 strain of avian influenza remained a major health concern as fears of a pandemic persisted.

In 2005, Singapore experienced its worst dengue fever outbreak on record.

== Politics and law ==
George W. Bush was sworn in for a second term as president of the United States in January, but he grew unpopular throughout the year. Iraq held its first free elections in decades, which were followed by the establishment of the Iraqi Transitional Government; a constitution was approved in a referendum, and new elections were held in December. The trial of former Iraqi president Saddam Hussein began on October 19, where he and seven others were accused of mass killings and torture.

Israeli Prime Minister Ariel Sharon and Palestinian President Mahmoud Abbas collaborated to reduce tensions in the Israeli–Palestinian conflict, but negotiations stalled as Hamas and Palestinian Islamic Jihad launched attacks against Israel.

Mahmoud Ahmadinejad won the 2005 Iranian presidential election.

Angela Merkel and the Christian Democrats won the 2005 German federal election.

Gerry Adams of Sinn Féin announced that the Irish Republican Army had disarmed.

UN Secretary-General Kofi Annan faced political backlash when it was discovered that his son Kojo Annan was involved in a corruption scandal in the UN Oil-for-Food Programme.

North Korean leader Kim Jong Il entered into talks with China and the United States to negotiate access to nuclear power.

Texas voters pass a referendum banning gay marriage in the state constitution. 76 percent vote in favor of the ban.

== Religion ==
Pope John Paul II died after serving as pope for approximately 27 years, the third longest tenure of any pope.

== Science ==
The birth of the first cloned dog, Snuppy, was announced in 2004. A report in Science announced several sightings of what may have been the ivory-billed woodpecker, which was feared extinct. Paleontologists announced the discovery of Falcarius utahenisis, presenting evidence of dinosaurs' evolution from small carnivores to large herbivores.

Space Shuttle Discovery launched on July 26, marking the resumption of flights after they were paused in response to the Space Shuttle Columbia disaster in 2003. The 15th anniversary of the Hubble Space Telescope was celebrated with the release of a photo featuring the Whirlpool Galaxy.

== Events ==
=== January ===
- January 1 – Jeanna Giese from Wisconsin, United States, comes home from the hospital and officially becomes the first person to ever survive rabies without a vaccination.
- January 5 – Eris, the most massive known dwarf planet in the Solar System, is discovered by a team led by Michael E. Brown using images originally taken on October 21, 2003, at the Palomar Observatory.
- January 9 – The Comprehensive Peace Agreement is signed, ending the Second Sudanese Civil War in Sudan.
- January 12 – Deep Impact is launched from Cape Canaveral with the purpose of studying the comet Tempel 1.
- January 14 – The Huygens spacecraft lands on Titan, the largest moon of Saturn.
- January 20 – The most intense solar particle event in recorded history is observed.

=== February ===
- February 7 – A presidential decree on redenomination of the Azerbaijani manat is issued, equating 1 new manat to 5000 old manats.
- February 10 – North Korea announces that it possesses nuclear weapons as a protection against the hostility it says it perceives from the United States.
- February 14
  - Former Lebanese Prime Minister Rafic Hariri is assassinated, along with 21 others, by a suicide bomber in Beirut.
  - YouTube, an American online video sharing and social media platform was founded by Steve Chen, Chad Hurley, and Jawed Karim headquartered in San Bruno, California.
  - Chad Hurley registers the youtube.com domain name.
- February 16 – The Kyoto Protocol officially goes into effect.

=== March ===
- March 11 – The University of Michigan's Kresge Hearing Research Institute announces the discovery of regrowing cochlea hair nerves in guinea pigs.
- March 13 – 2005 Liechtenstein general election: The Progressive Citizens' Party remains the largest party and wins a plurality of 12 seats in the Landtag.
- March 14 – China ratifies an anti-secession law, aimed at preventing Taiwan from declaring independence.
- March 23 – The Texas City refinery explosion leaves 15 people dead and 180 injured with a property loss of about $200 million.
- March 24 – The President of Kyrgyzstan, Askar Akayev, is deposed following mass anti-government demonstrations and flees the country.
- March 28 – The 8.6 M_{w} Nias–Simeulue earthquake shakes northern Sumatra with a maximum Mercalli intensity of VI (Strong), leaving 915–1,314 people dead and 340–1,146 injured.
- March 31 – The dwarf planet Makemake is discovered by a team led by Michael E. Brown at the Palomar Observatory.

=== April ===
- April 2 – Pope John Paul II dies; over four million people travel to the Vatican to mourn him. Pope Benedict XVI succeeds him on April 19, becoming the 265th pope.
- April 8 – The first solar eclipse of the year was a rare hybrid event, occurring at ascending node in Aries. This was 4.4 days after the Moon reached perigee. Gamma had a value of -0.34733. A hybrid solar eclipse was visible from south Pacific, Panama, Colombia and Venezuela, and was the 51st solar eclipse of Solar Saros 129.
- April 9 – Charles, Prince of Wales marries Camilla Parker Bowles in a civil ceremony at Windsor's Guildhall. Camilla receives the title Duchess of Cornwall.
- April 23 – The first ever YouTube video is uploaded, titled Me at the zoo.
- April 24 – The first lunar eclipse of the year was a penumbral event, occurring at descending node in Virgo. This was 5 days before the Moon reached perigee. Gamma had a value of -1.08851. A penumbral lunar eclipse was visible in eastern Asia, Australia, Pacific and Americas, and was the 23rd lunar eclipse of Lunar Saros 141.
- April 26 – Cedar Revolution: Syria withdraws the last of its military garrison from Lebanon, ending its 29-year military occupation of the country.
- April 27 – The Superjumbo jet aircraft Airbus A380 makes its first flight from Toulouse.

=== May ===
- May 5 – The 2005 United Kingdom general election is won by Prime Minister Tony Blair and the Labour Party for a third consecutive majority government.
- May 13 – Uzbek Interior Ministry and National Security Service troops massacre at least 200 protesters in the city of Andijan.
- May 18 – English whisky is re-established in England.
- May 19–21 – The Eurovision Song Contest 2005 takes place in Kyiv, Ukraine, and is won by Greek entrant Helena Paparizou with the song "My Number One".
- May 21
  - Kingda Ka is opened for the first time to the public at Six Flags Great Adventure, becoming the world's tallest and fastest roller coaster at the time.
  - David Foster Wallace delivers his now-famous commencement address, This Is Water at Kenyon College in Ohio.

=== June ===
- June 4 – The Civic Forum of the Romanians of Covasna, Harghita and Mureș is founded.
- June 9 – Video gamer Patrick Wildenborg discovered a hidden mod subtitled "Hot Coffee" in the hit video game Grand Theft Auto: San Andreas; the publication of the discovery went viral on that day, which followed by federal lawsuits and product recall towards its developers Take-Two Interactive and Rockstar Games.

=== July ===
- July 2 – Live 8, a set of 10 simultaneous concerts, takes place throughout the world, raising interest in the Make Poverty History campaign.
- July 6
  - The European Parliament rejects the proposed directive on the patentability of computer-implemented inventions in its second reading.
  - The International Olympic Committee awards London the right to host the 2012 Summer Olympics.
- July 7 – Four coordinated suicide bombings hit central London, killing 52 people and injuring over 700.
- July 23 – A series of bombings hit the resort city of Sharm El Sheikh, Egypt, killing over 80 people.
- July 28 – As a result of the Good Friday Agreement signed in 1998, the Provisional Irish Republican Army ends its armed campaign and decommissions their weapons, by ordering all its units to drop their arms under the supervision of the Independent International Commission on Decommissioning.

=== August ===
- August 12 – The Mars Reconnaissance Orbiter is launched from Cape Canaveral, designed to explore Mars.
- August 14 – Helios Airways Flight 522, en route from Larnaca, Cyprus to Prague, Czech Republic via Athens, crashes in the hills near Grammatiko, Greece, killing 121 passengers and crew.
- August 16 – West Caribbean Airways Flight 708 crashes into a mountain in Venezuela, killing 160 passengers and crew.
- August 18 – Peace Mission 2005, the first joint China–Russia military exercise, begins its eight-day training on the Shandong Peninsula.
- August 26 – The Constitution of Chile is heavily amended, eliminating senators for life, reducing the presidential terms from six to four years, giving the president exclusive rights to summon the National Security Council, and removes legal obstacles for the creation of new regions.
- August 29 – Hurricane Katrina makes landfall along the U.S. Gulf Coast, causing severe damage, killing over a thousand people and causing an estimated $108 billion in damage.
- August 31 – The Al-Aimmah bridge disaster in Baghdad, Iraq kills 953 Shia Muslim pilgrims who were celebrating a religious festival.

=== September ===
- September 7 – Egypt holds its first ever multi-party presidential election, which is marred with allegations of fraud.
- September 12 – Israel demolishes multiple settlements and withdraws its army from the Gaza Strip.
- September 19 – North Korea agrees to stop building nuclear weapons in exchange for aid and cooperation.
- September 30 – Controversial drawings of Muhammad are printed in the Danish newspaper Jyllands-Posten, sparking outrage and violent riots by Muslims around the world.

=== October ===
- October 1 – A series of suicide bombs exploded at Kuta and Jimbaran, Bali, Indonesia. The attack killed 20 and injured over 100 others.
- October 3
  - Croatia and Turkey's accession negotiations to the European Union officially starts.
  - The second solar eclipse of 2005 was an annular event, occurring at descending node in Virgo. This was 4.8 days after the Moon reached apogee. Gamma had a value of 0.33058. An annular solar eclipse was visible in Portugal, Spain, Libya, Sudan and Kenya, and was the 43rd solar eclipse of Solar Saros 134.
- October 8 – The 7.6 M_{w} Kashmir earthquake strikes Azad Kashmir, Pakistan and nearby areas with a maximum Mercalli intensity of VIII (Severe), killing more than 86,000 people and displacing several million more.
- October 12 – The second crewed Chinese spacecraft, Shenzhou 6, is launched.
- October 17 – The final eclipse of 2005 was a partial lunar eclipse event, occurring at ascending node in Aries. This was 2.9 days after the Moon reached perigee. Gamma had a value of 0.97960. A partial lunar eclipse was visible in Asia, Australia, Pacific and North America, and was the 10th lunar eclipse of Lunar Saros 146.
- October 19 – The trial of Saddam Hussein begins.
- October 20 – The general conference of the United Nations Educational, Scientific and Cultural Organization (UNESCO) passes the Convention on the Protection and Promotion of the Diversity of Cultural Expressions.
- October 24
  - Hurricane Wilma, the most intense Atlantic hurricane on record, makes landfall near Cape Romano, causing an estimated $29.1 billion in damage.
  - African-American civil rights activist Rosa Parks dies of natural causes.

=== November ===
- November 9 – At least 60 people are killed and 115 more are wounded in a series of coordinated suicide bombings in Amman, Jordan.
- November 11 – In Kazakhstan, Zamanbek Nurkadilov, former mayor of Almaty, government minister and a political opponent of Nursultan Nazarbayev is found dead at his family compound.
- November 13 – Andrew Stimpson, a 25-year-old Scottish man, is reported as the first person proven to have been 'cured' of HIV.
- November 22
  - Angela Merkel assumes office as the first female Chancellor of Germany.
  - Microsoft releases the Xbox 360.
- November 23 – Ellen Johnson Sirleaf wins the Liberian general election, making her the first democratically elected female head of state in Africa.
- November 28 – The United Nations Climate Change Conference is held in Montreal.
- November 30 – Surgeons in France carry out the first human face transplant with Isabelle Dinoire becoming the first person to undergo it.

=== December ===
- December 12 – Scientists announce that they have created mice with small numbers of human neurons in an effort to make realistic models of neurological disorders.
- December 16 – Find-a-drug medical distributed computing project is concluded.
- December 18 – Chad descends into civil war after various rebel forces, with support from Sudan, attack the capital, N'Djamena.
- December 19 – Chalk's Ocean Airways Flight 101 crashes into the ocean off of Miami Beach in Florida. There were 20 fatalities.
- December 25 – An express train bound for the city of Niigata, Niigata Prefecture, Japan, is derailed by strong winds in Shonai, Yamagata Prefecture. Five people are killed and at least 33 injured.
- December 31 – Another second is added, 23:59:60, to end the year 2005, the first time since 1998.

== Births ==
- January 2 – Robbie Lee, British diver
- January 4
  - Dafne Keen, British and Spanish actress
  - Adrian Lyles, American musician and actor
- January 11
  - Teo Briones, American actor
  - Roksana Węgiel, Polish singer, winner of Junior Eurovision Song Contest 2018
- January 13 – Eva Brezalieva, Bulgarian rhythmic gymnast
- January 14 – Toni Firmansyah, Indonesian footballer
- January 21 – IShowSpeed, American YouTuber
- January 25 – Avantika Vandanapu, American actress and singer
- January 26 – Katie Beth Hall, American actress
- January 31 – Mallory James Mahoney, American actress
- February 15 – Nicolas Bechtel, American actor
- February 16 – Julio Soler, Argentine footballer
- February 19 – Alma Deutscher, British composer and former child prodigy
- February 20 – Cruz Beckham, British singer and musician and son of David Beckham and Victoria Beckham
- February 23
  - Arica Himmel, American actress
  - Jillian Ward, Filipino actress
- February 25 – Arda Güler, Turkish football player
- March 5 – Valentín Carboni, Argentine footballer
- March 9 – Brandon Scheunemann, Indonesian footballer
- March 21
  - Marselinus Ama Ola, Indonesian footballer
  - Kayla Cross, Canadian tennis player
- March 26 – Ella Anderson, American actress
- March 28 – D4vd, American singer
- March 30 – Santiago Fernández, Argentine footballer
- April 4 – Kadek Arel, Indonesian footballer
- April 11 – Muhammad Khalil, Malaysian footballer
- April 27 - Christopher Vizzina, American football player
- April 29 – Prince Dipangkorn Rasmijoti of Thailand, grandson of Bhumibol Adulyadej, son of King Maha Vajiralongkorn, Rama X of Thailand and his wife Srirasmi Suwadee
- May 3 – Maxwell Jenkins, American actor and musician
- May 5 – Haykal Danish, Malaysian footballer
- May 8
  - Muhammad Ragil, Indonesian footballer
  - Oliver Bearman, British racing driver
- May 11 – Ezra Frech, American track athlete and Paralympian
- May 14 – Maxwell Acee Donovan, American actor
- June 5 – Rylee Arnold, American dancer
- June 16 – Milton Delgado, Argentine footballer
- June 17 – Funa Nakayama, Japanese skateboarder
- June 18
  - Naura Ayu, Indonesian actress and singer
  - Kane Parsons, American YouTuber and filmmaker
- June 25 – Kylie Cantrall, American actress and singer
- June 26 – Princess Alexia of the Netherlands, daughter of Willem-Alexander of the Netherlands and his wife Queen Máxima of the Netherlands
- June 28 – Lane Factor, Native American actor
- July 5 – Sombr, American singer
- July 7 – Sam Morelos, American actor
- July 21 – Joseph Zada, Australian actor
- July 25 – Pierce Gagnon, American actor
- August 7 – Mufli Hidayat, Indonesian footballer
- August 8 – Alysa Liu, American figure skater
- August 10 – Sunny Suljic, American actor
- August 18 – Brady Hepner, American actor
- August 26 – Tomás Pérez – Argentine footballer
- September 20 – Jason Drucker, American actor
- September 26 – Jack Hoffman, American high school football player and pediatric brain cancer patient who met President Barack Obama in 2013 (d. 2025)
- September 28 – Sienna Spiro, English singer-songwriter and record producer
- September 29 – Gabrielle Gutierrez, Filipino-American stage actress
- October 1 – Rosalie Chiang, American actress
- October 4 – Prince Emmanuel of Belgium, younger son and third child of King Philippe and Queen Mathilde of Belgium
- October 7 – Lulu Wilson, American actress
- October 15 – Christian, Crown Prince of Denmark, son of Frederik X and his wife Queen Mary of Denmark
- October 16 − Ruby Rose Turner, American actress
- October 25 – Santino Andino, Argentine footballer
- October 31
  - Dixie Egerickx, English actress
  - Leonor, Princess of Asturias, daughter of Felipe VI of Spain and his wife Queen Letizia of Spain
- November 3
  - Fina Strazza, American actress
  - Lara Raj, American singer and member of Katseye
  - Beata MonaLisa, Swedish singer and younger sister of Greta Thunberg
- November 15 – Tsehay Hawkins, Australian dancer and singer
- November 16 – Mariam Mamadashvili, Georgian singer, winner of Junior Eurovision Song Contest 2016
- November 25 – Nick Annas, Australian actor
- December 1 – Violet Affleck, American spokesperson and daughter of Ben Affleck and Jennifer Garner
- December 3 – Prince Sverre Magnus of Norway, son of Haakon, Crown Prince of Norway and his wife Mette-Marit, Crown Princess of Norway, grandson of King Harald V of Norway
- December 17 - Clavicular, influencer in looksmaxxing
- December 20 – Arlyansyah Abdulmanan, Indonesian footballer
- December 22 – Lou Lou Safran, American actress and singer
- December 25 – Frederik Roslyng, Danish footballer
- December 27 – Kristina Pimenova, Russian model
- December 30 – Brady Noon, American actor

== Nobel Prizes ==

- Chemistry – Robert H. Grubbs, Richard R. Schrock, and Yves Chauvin
- Economics – Robert Aumann, and Thomas Schelling
- Literature – Harold Pinter
- Peace – Mohamed ElBaradei
- Physics – Roy J. Glauber, John L. Hall, and Theodor W. Hänsch
- Physiology or Medicine – Robin Warren, and Barry Marshall

== Bibliography ==
- Beven, John L.; Avila, Lixion A.; Blake, Eric S.; Brown, Daniel P.; Franklin, James L.; Knabb, Richard D.; Pasch, Richard J.; Rhome, Jamie R.; Stewart, Stacy R. (2008). "Atlantic Hurricane Season of 2005". Monthly Weather Review. 136 (3): 1109–1173. Bibcode:2008MWRv..136.1109B. doi:10.1175/2007MWR2074.1. ISSN 1520-0493.
- Corbett, Ronnie; Nobbs, David (2007) [2006]. And It's Goodnight From Him ...: The Autobiography of the Two Ronnies (Paperback ed.). Penguin. ISBN 978-0-14-102804-0.
- Harbom, Lotta; Högbladh, Stina; Wallensteen, Peter (2006). "Armed Conflict and Peace Agreements". Journal of Peace Research. 43 (5): 617–631. doi:10.1177/0022343306067613. ISSN 0022-3433. JSTOR 27640387.
- Holmqvist, Caroline (2006). "Major armed conflicts". SIPRI Yearbook 2006: Armaments, Disarmament and International Security. Stockholm International Peace Research Institute. pp. 77–107. ISBN 978-0-19-929873-0.
- Annual 2005 Global Climate Report (Report). National Oceanic and Atmospheric Administration. 2006. Archived from the original on May 14, 2025.
- O'Neill, Ann (January 1, 2006). "A year of epic disasters, terrorism and politics". CNN.com. Archived from the original on August 10, 2014.
- Saunders, Mark; Lea, Adam (January 9, 2006). Summary of 2005 NW Pacific Typhoon Season and Verification of Authors' Seasonal Forecasts (PDF). Tropical Storm Risk (Report). University College London. Archived (PDF) from the original on June 14, 2025.
- Time Annual 2006. Time. 2006. ISBN 1-932994-69-6.
- World Population Prospects 2024 (Report). United Nations Department of Economic and Social Affairs. 2024. Archived from the original on July 11, 2022.
- 2005 Global Refugee Trends (Report). United Nations High Commissioner for Refugees. 2006.
- World Economic Situation and Prospects 2006 (PDF) (Report). United Nations Department of Economic and Social Affairs. January 14, 2006. ISBN 92-1-109150-0.
