= Walter Krause =

Walter Krause may refer to:

- Walter Krause (footballer, born 1896), German international footballer
- Walter Krause (footballer, born 1953), German Bundesliga player
