= Roslyng =

Roslyng is a Danish origin given name and a surname. Notable people with the name include:

== Given name ==
- Lars Roslyng Christiansen (born 1972), Danish handball player

== Surname ==
- Christina Roslyng (born 1978), Danish handball player
- Frederik Roslyng (born 2005), Danish footballer
