= Johann Ludwig =

German footballer

Personal information
- Date of birth: 8 June 1903
- Date of death: 7 January 1985 (aged 81)
- Position: Forward

Senior career*
Years	Team	Apps	(Gls)
- Holstein Kiel

International career
1930–1931	Germany	3	(2)
- * Club domestic league appearances and goals

Johann Ludwig (8 June 1903 – 7 January 1985) was a German international footballer.
