= August Werner =

German footballer

Personal information
- Date of birth: 6 March 1896
- Date of death: 20 October 1968 (aged 72)
- Position: Defender

Senior career*
Years	Team	Apps	(Gls)
- Holstein Kiel

International career
1925	Germany	2	(0)
- * Club domestic league appearances and goals

August Werner (6 March 1896 – 20 October 1968) was a German international footballer.

His elder brother Adolf Werner was also an international footballer (they are among 14 sets of siblings to have played for Germany).
