= Werner Widmayer =

German footballer

Personal information
- Date of birth: 17 May 1909
- Place of birth: Kiel, German Empire
- Date of death: 14 June 1942 (aged 33)
- Place of death: Semenivka, Reichskommissariat Ukraine
- Position: Midfielder

Senior career*
Years	Team	Apps	(Gls)
- Holstein Kiel

International career
1931	Germany	2	(0)
- * Club domestic league appearances and goals

Werner Widmayer (17 May 1909 – 14 June 1942) was a German footballer.

== Personal life ==
Serving as an Oberleutnant in the German army, Widmayer died on 14 June 1942 in Semenivka, Ukraine during World War II at the age of 33.
