= Holstein Kiel =

German association football club

Coordinates: 54°20′55″N 10°07′27″E

- Full name: Kieler Sportvereinigung; Holstein von 1900 e.V.
- Nickname: Die Störche (The Storks)
- Founded: 7 October 1900; 126 years ago
- Ground: Holstein-Stadion
- Capacity: 15,034
- Managing director: Wolfgang Schwenke (Commercial); Olaf Rebbe (Sports)
- President: Steffen Schneekloth
- Head coach: Michél Kniat
- League: 2. Bundesliga
- 2025–26: 2. Bundesliga, 12th of 18
- Website: holstein-kiel.de
Home colours	Away colours	Third colours

Kieler Sportvereinigung Holstein von 1900 e.V., commonly known as Holstein Kiel (German pronunciation: [ˌhɔlʃtaɪn ˈkiːl]) or KSV Holstein, is a German association football and sports club based in the city of Kiel, Schleswig-Holstein. From the 1900s through the 1960s, the club was one of the most dominant sides in northern Germany. Some notable honors from that period include the German football championship in 1912, and being vice-champions 1910 and 1930. Holstein also won six regional titles and finished as runners-up another nine times. They remained a first-division side until the formation of the Bundesliga in 1963. They made their debut in the Bundesliga in the 2024–25 season after gaining promotion from the 2. Bundesliga in 2024, but were relegated after one season.

== History ==
=== Foundation to WWII ===
Holstein Kiel is the product of the merger of predecessor sides Kieler Fußball-Verein von 1900 and Kieler Fußball-Club Holstein. The earliest of these two sides was Kieler Fußball-Verein (later 1. KFV) established on 7 October 1900 out of the membership of the gymnastics club Kieler Männerturnvereins von 1844. Later the club concentrated on track and field athletics.

Kieler Fußball-Club Holstein was formed on 4 May 1902 and was renamed Fußball-Verein Holstein von 1902 (FV Holstein Kiel) sometime in 1908. The club quickly became competitive and, in 1910, they reached the German championship final, where they lost 0–1 in extra time to Karlsruher FV. In 1912, they won the German championship with a 2–1 overtime semi-final victory over defending champions Viktoria 89 Berlin followed by a 1–0 win in the final over the previous year's champions, Karlsruher FV. In 1914, the club renamed again after the new branches of hockey and athletics were added, becoming Sportverein Holstein von 1902.

On 7 June 1917, 1. Kieler Fussball Verein von 1900 and Sportverein Holstein von 1902, severely weakened by World War I, merged to form the current day club. The new association adopted the foundation date of the older club, while taking up the ground, kit, colours, logo and the name Holstein from SV Holstein Kiel. Through the 1920s, the team made regular appearances in the national playoffs and in 1926 reached the semi-finals where they were eliminated 1–3 by SpVgg Greuther Fürth. In 1930, they played their way to the final, losing 4–5 to Hertha BSC. The following year they reached the semi-finals where they were eliminated 0–2 by TSV 1860 Munich.

Under the Third Reich, German football was re-organized into sixteen top flight divisions. Kiel played in the Gauliga Nordmark, but failed to attain a title. In 1942, the Gauliga Nordmark was broken up into the Gauliga Hamburg and Gauliga Schleswig-Holstein. No longer in the company of Hamburger SV and other strong teams from the city, Kiel immediately won the title of the new division and defended it over the next two seasons until the end of World War II brought play to a halt across the country.

Those titles earned Kiel entry into the national playoff rounds. They made their best run in 1943 when they advanced as far as the semi-finals before losing to eventual champions Dresdner SC. The team secured third place by defeating First Vienna FC. The next year, they were eliminated early on and no final was played in 1945.

=== Postwar to 2000 ===
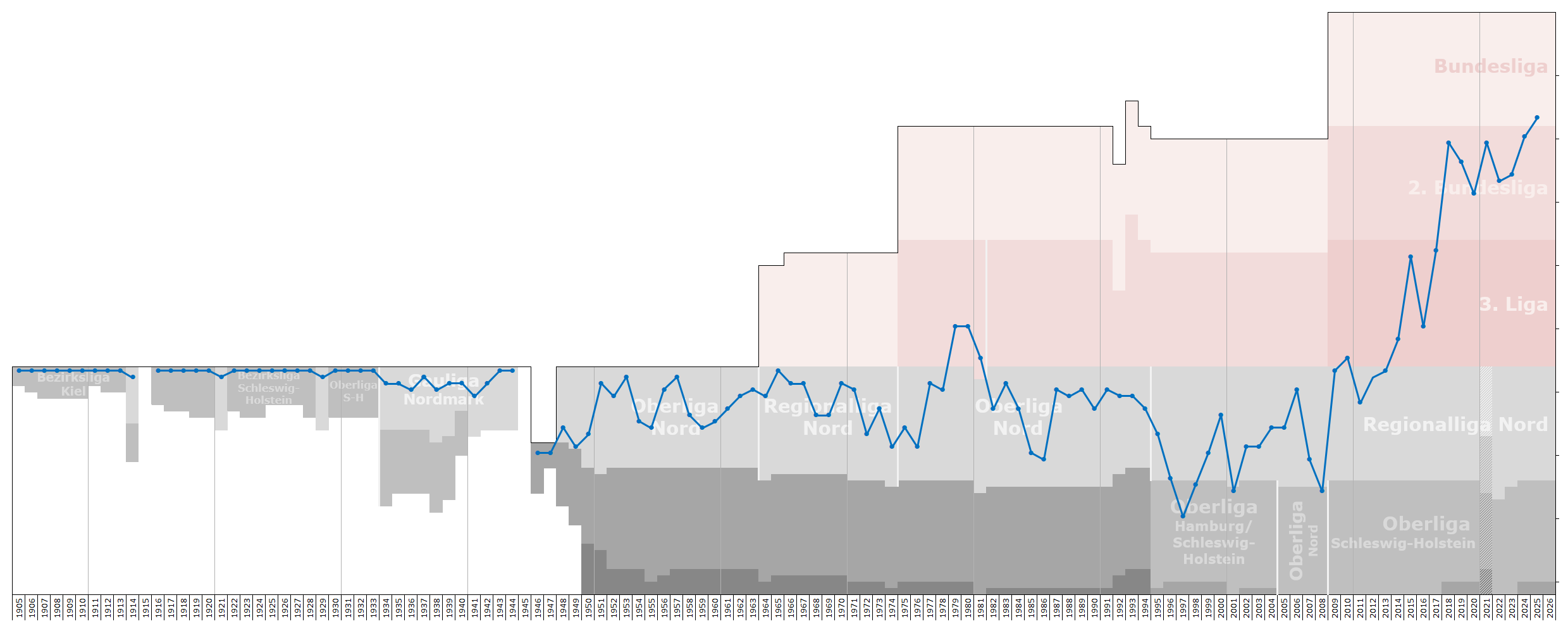
Historical chart of Holstein Kiel league performance

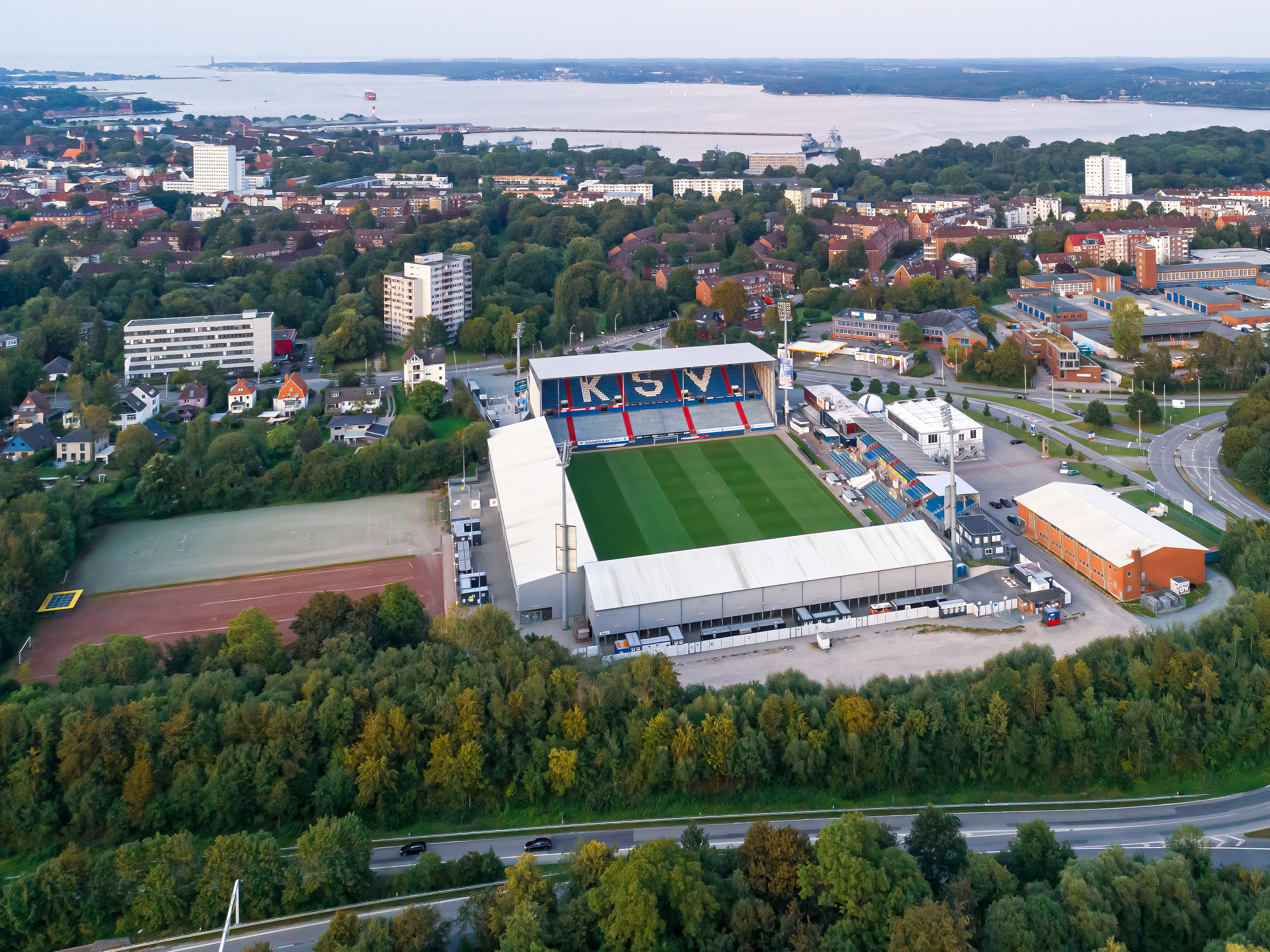
Aerial view of the Holstein-Stadion (2019)

Since the end of the war, Kiel has primarily been a tier II and III club. After the conflict, football in the western half of the country was re-organized into five regional top flight divisions. Holstein Kiel played from 1947 until 1963 in the Oberliga Nord (I) and twice finished as runners-up (1953, 1957). In 1961 the reserve team won the German amateur championship. After the 1963 formation of a single national first division known as the Bundesliga, the club became a second division side and played in the Regionalliga Nord (II). Kiel did not advance to the Bundesliga after its 1965 Regionalliga Nord championship. German football was restructured in 1974 with the formation of a new second division known as the 2. Bundesliga and the team slipped to third division play in the Amateuroberliga Nord (III). Holstein Kiel won promotion to second-tier competition in 1978 as part of the 2. Bundesliga Nord and was relegated in 1981.

With the reunification of Germany in 1990, teams from the former East Germany became part of a combined national competition. German football was re-organized again in 1994 and Holstein Kiel qualified for the new tier three division Regionalliga Nord (III). In 1996, the club was relegated for the first time to the Oberliga Hamburg/Schleswig-Holstein (IV) and returned to Regionalliga Nord (III) in 1998.

=== 2000–2017: Regionalliga and 3. Liga ===
The club were relegated again to the Oberliga Hamburg/Schleswig-Holstein (IV) in 2000–01, after failing to qualify for the restructured Regionalliga (III), which went from four divisions to two. They did advance the next year to Regionalliga North, then narrowly missed promotion to the 2. Bundesliga in the 2005–06 season. By 2007, they had slipped to the Oberliga Nord (IV), but earned two consecutive promotions to reach the new 3. Liga (III) in 2009. After one year in the third division, the club were relegated again in the Regionalliga Nord (IV). The team reached the quarter-finals of the 2011–12 DFB-Pokal, after beating FC Energie Cottbus, MSV Duisburg and 1. FSV Mainz 05. In the quarter-final they lost to Borussia Dortmund 4–0. Since 2013, the club played again in the third division, and, in 2017, they were promoted after 36 years to the second division.

=== 2017–present: 2. Bundesliga and promotion to Bundesliga ===
In the 2017–18 2. Bundesliga, after Holstein Kiel finished in 3rd place as the highest-scoring team with 71 goals, they lost 4–1 on aggregate to Wolfsburg in the relegation play-offs. In 2019, the club entered an official partnership with American USL League Two club San Francisco Glens SC. The team reached the semi-finals of the 2020–21 DFB-Pokal after beating Bayern Munich in the second round.

In the 2020–21 2. Bundesliga, Holstein Kiel missed direct promotion to the Bundesliga by losing the last two matches in the league by the same score 3–2 against Karlsruher SC and SV Darmstadt 98, to finish in third place behind VfL Bochum and Greuther Fürth. In the promotion play-offs, they won the first leg away 1–0 against FC Köln, but lost the second leg at home 5–1 to miss another chance of promotion.

On 11 May 2024, the club secured their inaugural promotion to the Bundesliga, clinching a top-two finish in the 2023–24 2. Bundesliga with a 1–1 draw against third-placed Fortuna Düsseldorf.

On 10 May 2025, Holstein Kiel suffered relegation on Matchday 33, with a 1–2 loss to SC Freiburg.

== Honours ==
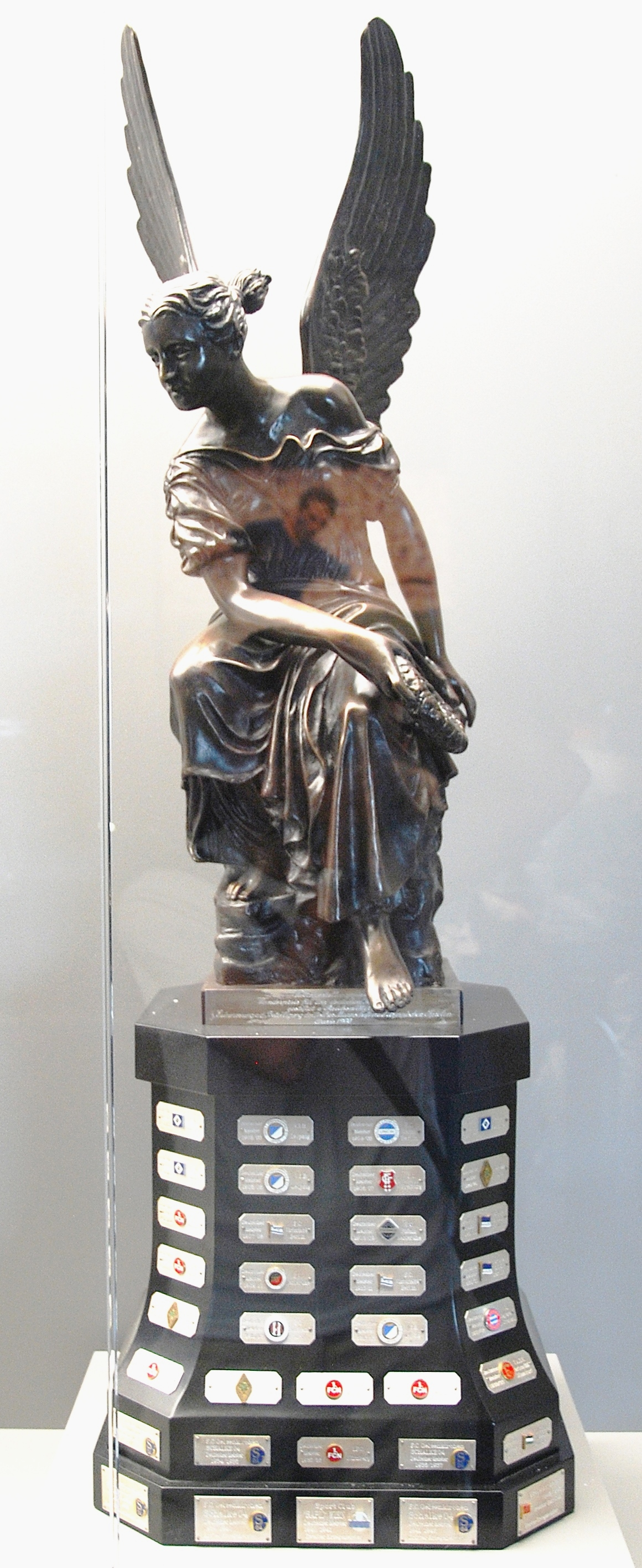
Viktoria trophy awarded to the German champions from 1903 to 1944

National titles

- German Championship
  - Champions: 1912
  - Runners-up: 1910, 1930
- German Cup
  - Semi-finals: 1941, 2021
  - Quarter-finals: 1943, 2012, 2025
  - Round of 16: 1962, 1966, 1971, 1979, 2019
- 2. Bundesliga
  - Runners-up – Promoted: 2024
  - Promotion Playoffs: 2018, 2021
- 3. Liga
  - Runners-up – Promoted: 2017
  - Promotion Playoffs: 2015

Regional

- Northern German football championship (I)
  - Champions: 1910, 1911, 1912, 1926, 1927, 1930
  - Runners-up: 1914, 1922, 1923, 1928, 1929, 1931, 1932
- Gauliga Nordmark (I)
  - Runners-up: 1937
- Gauliga Schleswig-Holstein (I)
  - Champions: 1943, 1944
- Regionalliga Nord (II)
  - Champions: 1965
- Oberliga Hamburg/Schleswig-Holstein (IV)
  - Champions: 1998, 2001
- Oberliga Nord (IV)
  - Champions: 2008
- Regionalliga Nord (IV)
  - Champions: 2009, 2013
- Schleswig-Holstein Cup (Tiers III-IV)
  - Winners: 1978, 1983, 1991, 1994, 1996, 2002, 2003, 2005, 2007, 2008, 2011, 2014, 2017

=== Reserve team ===
- German amateur championship
  - Champions: 1961
- Schleswig-Holstein-Liga
  - Champions: 1961, 1994, 2002, 2008, 2009, 2010
- Schleswig-Holstein Cup
  - Winners: 1961, 1962, 1966

order: (league/achievement/tier/year)

== Recent seasons ==
The recent season-by-season performance of the club:

=== Holstein Kiel ===
Year	Division	Tier	Position
2001–02	Regionalliga Nord	III	13th
2002–03	Regionalliga Nord	III	13th
2003–04	Regionalliga Nord	III	12th
2004–05	Regionalliga Nord	III	10th
2005–06	Regionalliga Nord	III	4th
2006–07	Regionalliga Nord	III	15th ↓
2007–08	Oberliga Nord	IV	1st ↑
2008–09	Regionalliga Nord	IV	1st ↑
2009–10	3. Liga	III	19th ↓
2010–11	Regionalliga Nord	IV	6th
2011–12	Regionalliga Nord	IV	2nd
2012–13	Regionalliga Nord	IV	1st ↑
2013–14	3. Liga	III	16th
2014–15	3. Liga	III	3rd
2015–16	3. Liga	III	14th
2016–17	3. Liga	III	2nd ↑
2017–18	2. Bundesliga	II	3rd
2018–19	2. Bundesliga	II	6th
2019–20	2. Bundesliga	II	11th
2020–21	2. Bundesliga	II	3rd
2021–22	2. Bundesliga	II	9th
2022–23	2. Bundesliga	II	8th
2023–24	2. Bundesliga	II	2nd ↑
2024–25	Bundesliga	I	17th ↓
2025–26	2. Bundesliga	II	12th
2026–27	2. Bundesliga	II	

=== Holstein Kiel II ===
Year	Division	Tier	Position
2001–02	Verbandsliga Schleswig-Holstein	V	1st ↑
2002–03	Oberliga Hamburg/Schleswig-Holstein	IV	15th
2003–04	Oberliga Hamburg/Schleswig-Holstein	IV	1st
2004–05	Oberliga Nord	IV	7th
2005–06	Oberliga Nord	IV	6th
2006–07	Oberliga Nord	IV	9th ↓
2007–08	Verbandsliga Schleswig-Holstein	V	1st
2008–09	Schleswig-Holstein-Liga	V	1st
2009–10	Schleswig-Holstein-Liga	V	1st
2010–11	Schleswig-Holstein-Liga	V	7th
2011–12	Schleswig-Holstein-Liga	V	3rd
2012–13	Schleswig-Holstein-Liga	V	2nd
2013–14	Schleswig-Holstein-Liga	V	4th
2014–15	Schleswig-Holstein-Liga	V	2nd
2015–16	Schleswig-Holstein-Liga	V	3rd
2016–17	Schleswig-Holstein-Liga	V	2nd
2017–18	Oberliga Schleswig-Holstein	V	1st ↑
2018–19	Regionalliga Nord	IV	10th
2019–20	Regionalliga Nord	IV	7th
2020–21	Regionalliga Nord	IV	9th
2021–22	Regionalliga Nord	IV	4th
2022–23	Regionalliga Nord	IV	12th
2023–24	Regionalliga Nord	IV	6th
2024–25	Regionalliga Nord	IV	17th ↓

- With the introduction of the Regionalligas in 1994 and the 3. Liga in 2008 as the new third tier, below the 2. Bundesliga, all leagues below dropped one tier.

Key

↑ Promoted	↓ Relegated

== League history ==
Since 1947

- 1947–63 Oberliga Nord (I)
- 1963–74 Regionalliga Nord (II)
- 1974–78 Amateuroberliga Nord/Oberliga Nord (III)
- 1978–81 2. Bundesliga Nord (II)
- 1981–94 Amateuroberliga Nord/Oberliga Nord (III)
- 1994–96 Regionalliga Nord (III)
- 1996–98 Oberliga Hamburg/Schleswig-Holstein (IV)
- 1998–00 Regionalliga Nord (III)
- 2000–01 Oberliga Hamburg/Schleswig-Holstein (IV)
- 2001–07 Regionalliga Nord (III)
- 2007–08 Oberliga Nord (IV)
- 2008–09 Regionalliga Nord (IV)
- 2009–10 3. Liga (III)
- 2010–13 Regionalliga Nord (IV)
- 2013–17 3. Liga (III)
- 2017–24 2. Bundesliga (II)
- 2024–25 Bundesliga (I)
- 2025– 2. Bundesliga (II)

== Players ==
=== Current squad ===
As of 3 September 2026

Note: Flags indicate national team as defined under FIFA eligibility rules; some limited exceptions apply. Players may hold more than one non-FIFA nationality.

No.	Pos.	Nation	Player
1	GK	GER	Timon Weiner
2	DF	DEN	Frederik Roslyng
3	DF	JPN	Niko Takahashi (on loan from Cerezo Osaka)
4	DF	GER	Sebastian Schonlau
5	DF	DEN	Noah Madsen
7	MF	GER	Steven Skrzybski
8	MF	ARG	Guillermo Balzi
9	FW	GEO	Giorgi Kvilitaia
10	MF	NOR	Jonas Therkelsen
11	FW	NED	Gyan de Regt
13	DF	CRO	Ivan Nekić
15	MF	DEN	Kasper Davidsen
16	MF	GER	Andu Kelati
17	FW	GER	Faride Alidou
19	FW	GER	Phil Harres
20	FW	SVK	Adrián Kaprálik

No.	Pos.	Nation	Player
22	FW	GER	Moritz Reimers
23	DF	GER	Lasse Rosenboom
24	MF	JPN	Taisei Abe (on loan from V-Varen Nagasaki)
26	DF	SLO	David Zec
27	MF	GER	Ikem Ugoh
28	MF	GER	Jonas Meffert (captain)
30	MF	GER	Tayar Tasdelen
31	GK	GER	Marcel Engelhardt
32	MF	JPN	Hiroki Sekine (on loan from Reims)
40	DF	KOS	Leon Parduzi
41	GK	GER	Lio Rothenhagen
46	DF	GER	Caspar Medlin
47	DF	USA	John Tolkin
48	MF	KOS	Hamza Muqaj
49	GK	LUX	Ben Schmit

=== Out on loan ===
Note: Flags indicate national team as defined under FIFA eligibility rules; some limited exceptions apply. Players may hold more than one non-FIFA nationality.

No.	Pos.	Nation	Player
—	GK	GER	Jonas Krumrey (at VfL Osnabrück until 30 June 2027)
—	DF	BIH	Mladen Cvjetinović (at 1. FC Saarbrücken until 30 June 2027)
—	DF	GER	Niklas Niehoff (at Rheindorf Altach until 30 June 2027)
—	MF	POL	Eryk Grzywacz (at TSV Havelse until 30 June 2027)

No.	Pos.	Nation	Player
—	MF	GER	Luca Prasse (at SV Meppen until 30 June 2027)
—	FW	GER	Toralf Hense (at Eimsbütteler TV until 31 December 2026)
—	FW	SLO	Aldin Jakupović (at NK Bravo until 30 June 2027)
—	FW	GER	Marcus Müller (at Wehen Wiesbaden until 30 June 2027)

=== Holstein Kiel II ===
As of 16 April 2026

Note: Flags indicate national team as defined under FIFA eligibility rules; some limited exceptions apply. Players may hold more than one non-FIFA nationality.

No.	Pos.	Nation	Player
1	GK	TUR	Tyler Doğan
2	DF	GER	Henrik Arnold
3	DF	KOS	Leon Parduzi
4	DF	GER	Caspar Medlin
6	MF	GER	Ikem Ugoh
7	MF	GER	Lenny Borges
8	DF	GER	Finn Wirlmann
9	FW	GER	Etienne Sohn
11	FW	GER	Jorden Winter
12	GK	GER	Henrie Müller-Kalthoff
13	FW	GER	Oskar von Esebeck
14	MF	GER	Cenğizhan Koç
15	DF	GER	Tim Ottlinger
16	DF	GER	Tim Spieckermann

No.	Pos.	Nation	Player
17	DF	GER	Veit Lückner
18	MF	GER	Ali Abdulla
19	FW	GER	Laurynas Kulikas
20	FW	ALG	Islam Matene
21	FW	GER	Kjell Knaak
22	FW	GER	Mätthi Meyer
23	FW	TUR	Enes Rüzgar
24	DF	GER	Malte Petersen
26	MF	GER	Lasse Soldanski
29	MF	SWE	Gustav Karimi
30	GK	GER	Lio Rothenhagen
31	DF	GER	Felix Boelter
32	MF	KOS	Hamza Muqaj

=== Notable former players ===
Germany

- (Germany) Adolf Werner (1902–1923)
- (Germany) Ernst Möller (1910–1916) (Scored the lone goal in 1912's championship match.)
- (Germany) Werner Baßler (1942–1944)
- (Germany) Ottmar Walter (1943)
- (Germany) Alfred Kelbassa (1943–1944)
- (Germany) Henry Peper (1950–1962) (Record goalkeeper after WW2 with 271 appearances)
- (Germany) Hans-Peter Ehlers (1953–66) (Record for the most matches after WW2 with 368 appearances)
- (Germany) Gerd Koll (1959–1968) (Record goalscorer with 141 goals)
- (Germany) Gerd Saborowski (1963–1966, 1971–1973)
- (Germany) Franz-Josef Hönig (1964–1967)
- (Germany) Andreas Köpke (1967–1983)
- (Germany) Francisco Copado (1989–1991)
- (Germany) Oliver Held (1993–1995)
- (Germany) Torben Hoffmann (1993–1995)
- (Germany) Daniel Jurgeleit (1999–2003)
- (Germany) Dirk Bremser (1999–2000)
- (Germany) Niels Hansen (2000–2005)
- (Germany) Marcus Marin (2001–2002)
- (Germany) Jens Dowe (2002–2004)
- (Germany) André Trulsen (2002–2004)
- (Germany) Sidney Sam (2002–2004)
- (Germany) André Breitenreiter (2003–2007)
- (Germany) Timo Schultz (2002–2005)
- (Germany) Simon Henzler (2004–2011)
- (Germany) Björn Lindemann (2004–2006)
- (Germany) Mike Rietpietsch (2006)
- (Germany) Christian Jürgensen (2006–2013)
- (Germany) Stefan Schnoor (2006–2007)
- (Germany) Christian Mikolajczak (2006–2007)
- (Germany) Tim Siedschlag (2007–2010, 2011–2018)
- (Germany) Alexander Nouri (2008–2010)
- (Germany) Marc Heider (2009–2016)
- (Germany) Fiete Sykora (2009–2015)
- (Germany) Patrick Herrmann (2011–2019)
- (Germany) Marcel Schied (2012–2014)
- (Germany) Patrick Kohlmann (2014–2017)
- (Germany) Manuel Schäffler (2014–2016)
- (Germany) Rafael Czichos (2015–2018)
- (Germany) Dominik Schmidt (2015–2020)
- (Germany) Dominick Drexler (2016–2018)
- (Germany) Dominic Peitz (2016–2019)
- (Germany) Marvin Ducksch (2017–2018)
- (Germany) Christopher Lenz (2017–2018)
- (Germany) Johannes van den Bergh (2017–2022)
- (Turkey) Atakan Karazor (2017–2019)
- (Germany) David Kinsombi (2017–2019)
- (Germany) Jannik Dehm (2018–2021)
- (Germany) Jonas Meffert (2018–2021)
- (Germany) Phil Neumann (2019–2022)

International

- (Denmark) Sophus Nielsen (1910–1911)
- (Hungary) Gábor Obitz (1925–1926)
- (Greece) Dimitrios Daras (1980–1981)
- (Brazil) Émerson Luiz Firmino (1993–1994)
- (Bulgaria) Pavel Dochev (1994–1995)
- (Lithuania) Dmitrijus Guščinas (1999–2003, 2007–2010)
- (Poland) Marek Trejgis (2001–2004)
- (Brazil) Daniel Teixeira (2003–2004)
- (Czech Republic) Pavel Dobrý (2004–2007)
- (United States) Ryan Coiner (2005–2006)
- (Democratic Republic of the Congo) Michél Mazingu-Dinzey (2007–2008)
- (United States) Kenneth Kronholm (2014–2019)
- (Ghana) Kingsley Schindler (2016–2019)
- (South Korea) Lee Jae-sung (2018–2021)
- (Japan) Masaya Okugawa (2018–2019)
- (Slovakia) László Bénes (2019)
- (Turkey) Salih Özcan (2019–2020)

=== Germany international footballers ===
- Franz Esser (1 / 0 / 1922)
- Willi Fick (1 / 1 / 1910)
- Walter Krause (5 / 0 / 1921–1924)
- Georg Krogmann (3 / 0 / 1912)
- Johannes Ludwig (3 / 2 / 1930–1931)
- Ernst Möller (9 / 4 / 1911–1913)
- Hans Reese (1 / 0 / 1912)
- Oskar Ritter (1 / 0 / 1925)
- Karl Schulz (2 / 0 / 1925)
- Kurt Voß (2 / 2 / 1925)
- Adolf Werner (9 / 0 / 1909–1912)
- August Werner (2 / 0 / 1925)
- Werner Widmayer (2 / 0 / 1931)

Players which achieve during their active years at Holstein Kiel to become Germany international footballers. In parentheses (games / goals/ years).

== Coaching staff ==
Position	Name
Head coach	(Germany) Michél Kniat
Assistant coach	(Germany) Dani Jara (Germany) Janik Steringer
Goalkeeper coach	(Germany) Niklas Jakusch (Germany) Patrik Borger
Athletic coach	(Germany) Lasse Bork (Germany) Timm Sörensen
Head of scouting & analysis	(Germany) Alexander Rudies
Video analyst	(Japan) Takahiro Sato
Team doctor	(Germany) Dr. Andre Hönig (Germany) Dr. Marco Diekmann
Head of physiotherapy	(Germany) Tim Höper
Physiotherapist	(Germany) David Hallmann (Germany) Gunnar Kugler (Germany) Melanie Köhn (Germany) Timm Pflügler (Germany) Timo Syroka
Head of team management	(Germany) Sebastian Ermuth
Team manager	(Germany) Tim Petersen
Supervisor league	(Germany) Lars Jordan
Bus driver	(Germany) Tim Brockmüller

== Women's section ==
Since July 2004, the club has a women's football section as Wittenseer SV-TUS Felde dissolved their club to join Holstein Kiel. The team played from 2005–06 to 2010–11 in the 2. Bundesliga, then experienced promotions and relegations between the latter and Regionalliga Nord.

== Other departments ==
Other departments are team handball (men and women), tennis, and cheerleading. The women's handball team won the 1971 German handball championship.
