= Franz Esser =

German footballer and manager

Personal information
- Date of birth: 20 January 1900
- Date of death: 21 September 1982 (aged 82)
- Position: Forward

Senior career*
Years	Team	Apps	(Gls)
- Holstein Kiel

International career
1922	Germany	1	(0)
- * Club domestic league appearances and goals

Franz Esser (20 January 1900 – 21 September 1982) was a German international footballer.
