= Adolf Werner =

German footballer

Adolf "Adsch" Werner
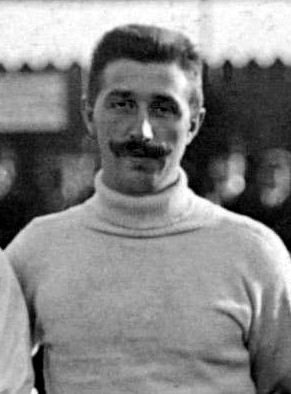
- Werner in 1910

Personal information
- Date of birth: 19 October 1886
- Place of birth: Kiel, Germany
- Date of death: 6 September 1975 (aged 88)
- Position: Goalkeeper

Senior career*
Years	Team	Apps	(Gls)
- Holstein Kiel

International career
	Germany	13	(0)
- * Club domestic league appearances and goals

Adolf "Adsch" Friedrich August Werner (19 October 1886 in Kiel – 6 September 1975) was a German amateur football player.

== Club career ==
With his club Holstein Kiel he won the German football championship in 1912.

== International career ==
Werner competed in the 1912 Summer Olympics. As member of the German Olympic squad and he played two matches in the consolation tournament as goalkeeper. Overall he won 13 caps for Germany.

His younger brother August Werner was also an international footballer (they are among 14 sets of siblings to have played for Germany).
