= Noah Madsen =

Danish footballer

Personal information
- Full name: Noah Haubjerg Ellegaard Madsen
- Date of birth: 17 September 2001 (age 25)
- Place of birth: Jelling, Denmark
- Height: 1.87 m (6 ft 2 in)
- Position: Centre-back

Team information
- Current team: Holstein Kiel
- Number: 5

Youth career
- –2013: Jelling fS
- 2013–2019: Vejle
- 2019–2020: Nacional
- 2021–2023: Marítimo

Senior career*
Years	Team	Apps	(Gls)
2020–2021	Estrela B	5	(0)
2020–2021	Estrela	1	(0)
2021–2026	Marítimo B	35	(0)
2024–2026	Marítimo	44	(3)
2026–	Holstein Kiel	0	(0)
- * Club domestic league appearances and goals as of 19 August 2026

Noah Haubjerg Ellegaard Madsen (born 17 September 2001) is a Danish professional footballer who plays as a centre-back for 2. Bundesliga club Holstein Kiel.

== Career ==
Growing up in Jelling, Madsen started his football career in the local club Jelling fS, before later switching to Vejle Boldklub. In Vejle, he was seriously injured as a U17 player and was out for almost two years. Instead of continuing in Vejle, he switched to Nacional after a trial stay, where he would play for the club's U-19 team.

In August 2020, Madsen made the move to Estrela. He only played one match for the club's first team, which played in the Campeonato de Portugal, on 25 October 2020 against Oriental.

In August 2021, Madsen transferred to Marítimo. The first few years he played for the club's U23 and B team. On 29 September 2024, he finally made his professional debut when he was in the starting lineup against U.D. Leiria in the Liga Portugal 2. In January 2025, after playing four first team games for Marítimo, the club confirmed that Madsen had extended his contract until June 2026.

Madsen moved to 2. Bundesliga club Holstein Kiel in August 2026, signing a contract until 2030.
