= Marek Trejgis =

Polish footballer

Personal information
- Date of birth: 4 March 1977 (age 49)
- Place of birth: Stargard, Poland
- Height: 1.80 m (5 ft 11 in)
- Position: Forward

Youth career
- Błękitni Stargard Szczeciński
- Polonia Hamburg
- ASV Bergedorf 85
- Hamburger SV

Senior career*
Years	Team	Apps	(Gls)
1997–1999	Hamburger SV	11	(0)
1999–2001	FC St. Pauli	26	(1)
2001	Panionios	2	(0)
2001–2004	Holstein Kiel	68	(12)
2004–2005	Stuttgarter Kickers	3	(0)
Total		110	(13)
- * Club domestic league appearances and goals

Marek Trejgis (born 4 March 1975) is a Polish former professional footballer who played as a forward.

== Career ==
Trejgis began his professional football career with Hamburger SV, the club with whom he would make 11 Bundesliga appearances. He had a brief spell with Panionios where he made two appearances for the club in the Alpha Ethniki.
