= Find-a-Drug =

Non-profit volunteer computing project

Find-a-Drug (often abbreviated as 'FAD') was a not for profit volunteer computing project which was set up in April 2002 by Treweren Consultants, the company who developed the THINK software. Find-a-Drug aimed to run a series of projects in parallel addressing a number of diseases which have a major impact on health. The project sought to collaborate with the world's leading experts including academics in each therapeutic area.

The first internet based computing project which used the THINK virtual screening software was hosted on grid.org by United Devices in collaboration with the Oxford University. Funding for the original project came from the National Foundation for Cancer Research and Intel Corporation. The science for this project was directed by Keith Davies while he was an honorary research fellow at Oxford University. Davies was a founding Director of Treweren Consultants and Find-a-Drug. The Find-a-Drug cancer project was a reflection on Davies's personal motivations and interest in continuing the work begun with grid.org developing therapies for a disease which affects one in four individuals.

Find-a-Drug concluded on 16 December 2005, citing that "there are insufficient worthwhile protein queries to continue the project into 2006 and have decided to close the project."

== See also ==
- List of volunteer computing projects
