= Walter Krause (footballer, born 1896) =

German footballer

Personal information
- Date of birth: 14 March 1896
- Date of death: 28 April 1948 (aged 52)
- Position: Midfielder

Senior career*
Years	Team	Apps	(Gls)
- SC Victoria Hamburg
- Holstein Kiel

International career
1920–1924	Germany	6	(0)
- * Club domestic league appearances and goals

Walter Krause (14 March 1896 – 28 April 1948) was a German international footballer.
