= Andrew Stimpson =

British model

- Born: 1980 (age 44–45); Largs, Scotland
- Occupation: Model

Andrew Stimpson (born 1980 in Largs, Scotland) is a former glamour model, who was once cover boy and centrefold of Euroboy magazine. He tested negative for HIV fourteen months after three initial tests returned a positive result. While there have been anecdotal reports from Africa of people fighting off the virus, Stimpson's case was the first to have been medically documented and tested.

After having contracted the disease from his HIV-positive boyfriend Juan Gomez, Stimpson first stated that he felt "tired, weak and feverish" and had three HIV antibody tests at the Victoria Clinic for Sexual Health in west London. In October 2003, Stimpson was offered another test, which came back negative. He claimed he was "baffled" and "convinced there must have been a mistake". He sued the hospital, but two later tests confirmed that both results were correct.

As Stimpson was in the early stages of HIV infection, he was not taking any medication, and was only prescribed daily supplements.

While the hospital could not confirm if Stimpson has actually been cured of the disease, he has been urged to return for further tests in hope of reproducing the result in others. Stimpson spent weeks meeting with some of the world's leading HIV specialists, immunologists and virologists. After many tests there was still no answer as to what had actually happened. All that he was told was that there were no mistakes and somehow during those fourteen months he had gone from HIV positive to HIV negative.

== Explanations ==
In addition to the simple explanation of three consecutive false positive tests, three other explanations for the initial HIV+ tests have been put forward that do not depend on Stimpson having been infected with HIV and then becoming HIV-free:

- The temporary presence of malformed HIV particles, which were unable to successfully establish an ongoing infection.
- Developing a sort of immunization through repeated exposure to HIV or its component proteins, which would produce a natural antibody response against HIV.
- Spontaneous seroreversion (when the body stops producing antibodies against a protein) despite the ongoing presence of the virus; this is a type of immune tolerance.

The more specific and sensitive RT-PCR test for HIV's genome does not appear to have been performed.
