= Frederik Roslyng =

Danish footballer (born 2005)

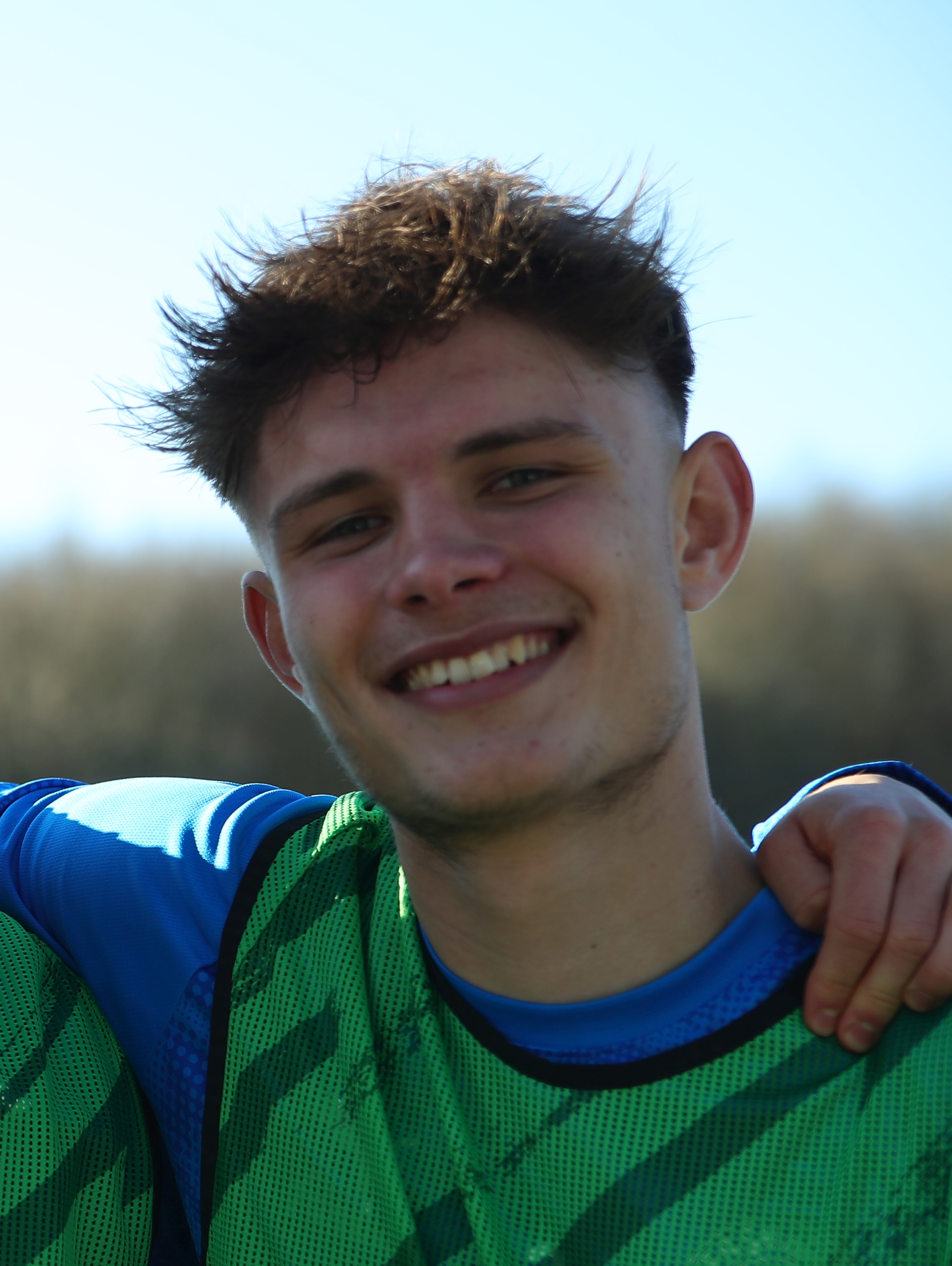
- Roslyng in 2026

Personal information
- Full name: Frederik Roslyng Christiansen
- Date of birth: 25 December 2005 (age 20)
- Place of birth: Flensburg, Germany
- Height: 1.89 m (6 ft 2 in)
- Position: Centre-back

Team information
- Current team: Holstein Kiel
- Number: 2

Youth career
- ?–2019: Juelsminde IF
- 2019–2025: AC Horsens

Senior career*
Years	Team	Apps	(Gls)
2023–2025	AC Horsens	32	(1)
2025–	Holstein Kiel	9	(0)
2025–	Holstein Kiel II	3	(0)

International career^{‡}
2021	Denmark U17	2	(0)
2024–	Denmark U19	3	(0)
2024–	Denmark U20	3	(0)
- * Club domestic league appearances and goals as of 18 May 2026 ‡ National team caps and goals as of 22:00, 20 December 2025 (UTC)

Frederik Roslyng Christiansen (born 25 December 2005) is a Danish professional footballer who plays as a centre-back for 2. Bundesliga club Holstein Kiel. He is a Denmark youth international.

== Club career ==
Roslyng made his professional debut at the age of 17 with AC Horsens.

In August 2025 he joined German club Holstein Kiel, which had been relegated from the Bundesliga to the 2. Bundesliga the previous season, signing a contract until June 2029. The transfer fee paid to Horsens was reported as €1.2 million.

== International career ==
Roslyng has appeared for the Denmark U19 and Denmark U20 national teams.

== Personal life ==
Roslyng's parents Lars Christiansen and Christina Roslyng are former handball players. He was born in Flensburg, 7 kilometres from the Danish border, when his father Lars was playing for German side SG Flensburg-Handewitt.

== Career statistics ==
As of match played 20 December 2025

Appearances and goals by club, season and competition
Club	Season	League			National cup (Note: Includes Danish Cup.)		Total	
Club	Season	Division	Apps	Goals	Apps	Goals	Apps	Goals
AC Horsens	2023–24	Danish 1st Division	7	0	0	0	7	0
AC Horsens	2024–25	Danish 1st Division	20	1	2	0	22	1
AC Horsens	2025–26	Danish 1st Division	5	0	1	0	6	0
AC Horsens	Total		32	1	4	0	36	1
Holstein Kiel II	2025–26	Oberliga Schleswig-Holstein	1	0	–		1	0
Holstein Kiel	2025–26	2. Bundesliga	2	0	0	0	2	0
Career total			35	1	4	0	39	1
